= Verano de Escándalo =

Lucha Libre AAA World Wide event series

- AAA Verano de Escándalo logo used in 2026
- Promotions: Lucha Libre AAA Worldwide
- First event: Verano de Escándalo (1997)

Verano de Escándalo (Spanish for "Summer of Scandal") is a major annual professional wrestling event in Mexico promoted by the Lucha Libre AAA World Wide (AAA) promotion. The show is as the name indicates a summer show, traditionally held in September. The first show was held in 1997 and since then twenty-two events have been held, the more recent ones generally presented on pay-per-view while the early shows were shown as Television specials on the Televisa channel. Historically, Verano de Escándalo was the first major show by AAA after their annual Triplemanía event, and generally featured storylines or feuds stemming from that event, though following its return in 2014 the event has been held before or after that corresponding year's Triplemania. It is generally seen as the smallest of the five major shows AAA puts together every year. The most recent event was the 2026 event, the twenty-fourth overall Verano de Escándalo in the series.

== Event history ==
The first Verano de Escándalo event was held on September 14, 1997 and has been held in September 11 out of 13 times, with one event in August (2003) and one in October (2004). All Verano de Escándalo shows have been held in Mexico, with most events, three, being held in Naucalpan, Mexico State. As is tradition with AAA major events the wrestlers compete inside a hexagonal wrestling ring and not the four sided ring the promotion uses for television events and House shows. The highest documentede attendance for a Verano de Escándalo show was 18,500 spectators for the 1997 event. The lowest recorded attendance was 4,021 spectators for the 1999 event.

As of 2015, Verano de Escándalo has seen fourteen Luchas de Apuestas, or bet fights. Two times a wrestler has been unmasked and twelve times a wrestler or wrestlers have hair their hair shaved off as a result of losing the Apusta match. The event has hosted twelve championship matches, with seven championships changing hands. Twice Verano de Escándalo has been host to the final match of a tournament to establish a new AAA Championship, in 2007 the first ever AAA Mega Champion was determined and in 2008 the first ever AAA World Mini-Estrella Champion was crowned. Of the fifteen main events to date six have been a steel cage elimination match under Apuesta rules.

For the first time in sixteen years, Verano de Escándalo did not take place in 2012 as Triplemanía XX was moved to August from its usual position in June. In 2013, Triplemanía XXI was moved back to June, but Verano de Escándalo still did not take place. After a two-year break, the event returned in 2014. No event was held in 2016.

== List of events ==
| # | Event | Date | City | Venue | Main event | Ref |
|---|---|---|---|---|---|---|
| 1 | Verano de Escándalo (1997) | September 14, 1997 | Tonalá, Jalisco, Mexico | Río Nilo Coliseum | Perro Aguayo, Perro Aguayo Jr., and Heavy Metal vs. Sangre Chicano, El Picudo, and El Cobarde II in a Steel Cage elimination Lucha de Apuestas match | |
| 2 | Verano de Escándalo (1998) | September 18, 1998 | Madero, Tamaulipas, Mexico | —N/a | Heavy Metal and Blue Demon Jr. vs. Kick Boxer and Abismo Negro in a Steel Cage match | |
| 3 | Verano de Escándalo (1999) | September 17, 1999 | Mexico City, Mexico | Juan de la Barrera Gym | Heavy Metal and Octagón vs. Jaque Mate and Kick Boxer in a Steel Cage Lucha de Apuestas match | |
| 4 | Verano de Escándalo (2000) | September 29, 2000 | Ciudad Madero, Mexico | —N/a | Heavy Metal and Perro Aguayo Jr. vs. Latin Lover and Héctor Garza | |
| 5 | Verano de Escándalo (2001) | September 16, 2001 | Naucalpan, Mexico | El Toreo | Canek, Zorro, Latin Lover, and Heavy Metal vs. Cibernético, Headhunter I, Electroshock, and Abismo Negro | |
| 6 | Verano de Escándalo (2002) | September 16, 2002 | Naucalpan, Mexico | El Toreo | El Dandy vs. Electroshock vs. El Zorro vs. Perro Aguayo Jr. in a Luchas de Apuestas elimination tag team match | |
| 7 | Verano de Escándalo (2003) | August 31, 2003 | Monterrey, Nuevo León, Mexico | —N/a | El Brazo vs. Heavy Metal vs. Oscar Sevilla vs. Sangre Chicana vs. El Texano vs. El Zorro in a Steel Cage Luchas de Apuestas match | |
| 8 | Verano de Escándalo (2004) | October 16, 2004 | Orizaba, Mexico | —N/a | Heavy Metal, El Intocable, and Zorro vs. Los Vipers (Histeria (wrestler), Mosco de la Merced, and Psicosis) in a Steel Cage Luchas de Apuestas match | |
| 9 | Verano de Escándalo (2005) | September 18, 2005 | Naucalpan, Mexico | El Toreo | Chessman vs. Cibernético vs. Shocker vs. Latin Lover in a Steel Cage Luchas de Apuestas match | |
| 10 | Verano de Escándalo (2006) | September 17, 2006 | Naucalpan, Mexico | El Toreo | Gronda, Octagón, and La Parka vs. La Legión Extranjera (Abyss, Jeff Jarrett, and Konnan) | |
| 11 | Verano de Escándalo (2007) | September 16, 2007 | Guadalajara, Jalisco, Mexico | Plaza de Toros | Los Hell Brothers (Charly Manson, Chessman, and Cibernético) and El Zorro vs. The Black Family (Dark Cuervo, Dark Escoria, Dark Espíritu, and Dark Ozz) in a Domo de la Muerte match | |
| 12 | Verano de Escándalo (2008) | September 14, 2008 | Zapopan, Mexico | Auditorio Benito Juarez | Vampiro vs. El Mesías in a Steel Cage match | |
| 13 | Verano de Escándalo (2009) | August 21, 2009 | Ciudad Madero, Tamaulipas, Mexico | Centro de Convenciones de Ciudad Madero | Dr. Wagner Jr. vs. El Mesías vs. Cibernético in a Cage match for the AAA Mega Championship | |
| 14 | Verano de Escándalo (2010) | August 14, 2010 | Orizaba, Veracruz, Mexico | Plaza de Toros La Concordia | Los Perros del Mal (El Hijo del Perro Aguayo, Damián 666, and L.A. Park) vs. Cibernético, El Mesías, and La Parka | |
| 15 | Verano de Escándalo (2011) | July 31, 2011 | Guadalajara, Jalisco, Mexico | Plaza Nuevo Progreso | Los Perros del Mal (Damián 666, Halloween, and X-Fly) vs. Los Psycho Circus (Monster Clown, Murder Clown, and Psycho Clown) in a Steel Cage Máscara contra Cabellera match | |
| 16 | Verano de Escándalo (2014) | June 7, 2014 | Orizaba, Veracruz, Mexico | Plaza de Toros La Concordia | Cibernético, Myzteziz, and La Parka vs. La Sociedad (Averno, Chessman, and El Hijo del Perro Aguayo) | |
| 17 | Verano de Escándalo (2015) | June 14, 2015 | Monterrey, Nuevo León, Mexico | Arena Monterrey | Myzteziz, La Parka, and Rey Mysterio Jr. vs. Johnny Mundo, El Mesías, and Pentagón Jr. | |
| 18 | Verano de Escándalo (2017) | June 4, 2017 | Ciudad Juárez, Chihuahua, Mexico | Gimnasio Josué Neri Santos | Psycho Clown and Dr. Wagner Jr. vs. Nuevo Poder del Norte (Soul Rocker and Carta Brava Jr.) vs. Los Totalmente Traidores (Monster Clown and Murder Clown) in a Three-way tag team Luchas de Apuestas match | |
| 19 | Verano de Escándalo (2018) | June 3, 2018 | Monterrey, Nuevo León, Mexico | Plaza de Toros La Monumental | Rey Wagner vs. Rey Mysterio Jr. vs. Jeff Jarrett for the AAA Mega Championship | |
| 20 | Verano de Escándalo (2019) | June 16, 2019 | Mérida, Yucatán, Mexico | Poliforum Zamná | Psycho Clown and Rey Wagner vs. Blue Demon Jr. and Taurus | |
| 21 | Verano de Escándalo (2021) | July 3, 2021 | Querétaro, Mexico | —N/a | Los Mercenarios (Rey Escorpion, Taurus, and Texano Jr.) vs. Los Psycho Circus (Monster Clown, Murder Clown and Psycho Clown) | |
| 22 | Verano de Escándalo (2022) | August 5, 2022 | Aguascalientes, Aguascalientes, Mexico | Arena San Marcos | Taya and Los Lucha Bros (Fénix and Pentagón Jr.) vs. Chik Tormenta, Taurus, and Hijo del Vikingo | |
| 23 | Verano de Escándalo (2023) | July 21, 2023 | Aguascalientes, Aguascalientes, Mexico | Arena San Marcos | Sam Adonis, Cibernético, and Gringo Loco vs. El Hijo del Vikingo, Alberto El Patrón, and Psycho Clown | |
| 24 | Verano de Escándalo (2024) | August 2, 2024 | Aguascalientes, Aguascalientes, Mexico | Palenque de la Feria | La Secta Del Mesías (El Mesias, Dark Escoria, and Dark Espíritu) vs. Los Psycho Circus (Murder Clown, Dave the Clown, and Panic Clown) vs. Fresero Jr. and Nueva Generación Dinamita (Sansón and Forastero) in a three-way Steel Cage match | |
| 25 | Verano de Escándalo (2025) | July 11, 2025 | Aguascalientes, Aguascalientes, Mexico | Arena San Marcos | El Hijo del Vikingo and King Vikingo vs. Alberto El Patrón and El Mesías | |
| 26 | Verano de Escándalo (2026) | July 25, 2026 | Aguascalientes, Aguascalientes, Mexico | Arena San Marcos | Flammer (c) vs. La Catalina vs. Lady Shani in a triple threat match for the AAA Reina de Reinas Championship | |
