= Verano de Escándalo (2006) =

2006 Lucha Libre AAA World Wide event

Verano de Escándalo 2006
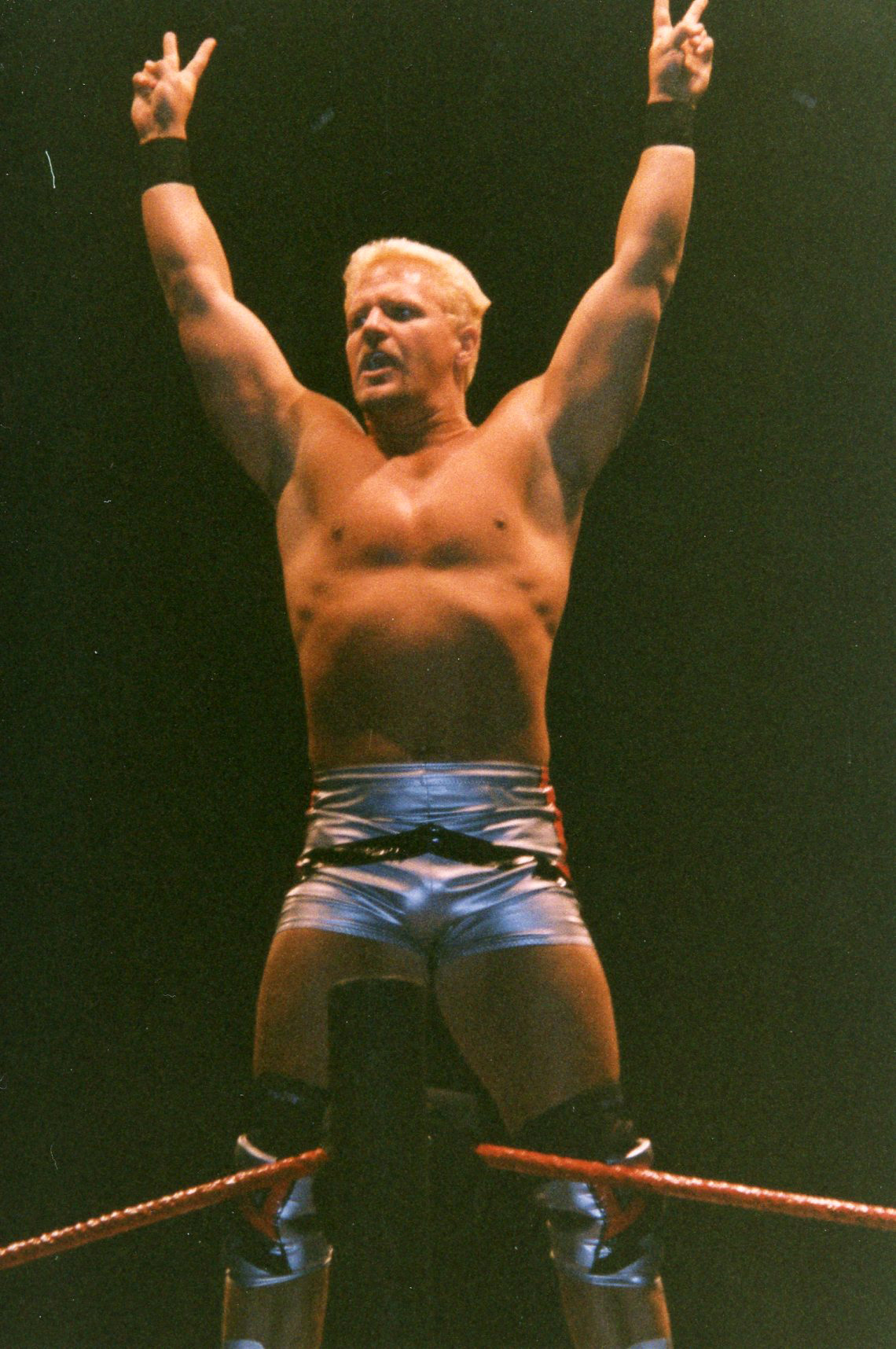
- Jeff Jarrett, flown to Mexico for the show
- Promotion: AAA
- Date: September 17, 2006
- City: Naucalpan, Mexico
- Venue: El Toreo
- Attendance: 17,000

Pay-per-view chronology
← Previous; Triplemanía XIV	Next → Guerra de Titanes

Verano de Escándalo chronology
← Previous; 2005	Next → 2007

The 2006 Verano de Escándalo (Spanish for "Summer of Scandal") was the tenth annual Verano de Escándalo professional wrestling show promoted by AAA. The show took place on September 17, 2006, in Naucalpan like the previous year's event. The main event featured a six-man "Lucha Libre rules" tag team match between the AAA Loyalist team of Gronda, Octagón, and La Parka and the Total Nonstop Action Wrestling (TNA) representatives Jeff Jarrett, Abyss, and Konnan.

== Production ==
=== Background ===
First held during the summer of 1997 the Mexican professional wrestling, company AAA began holding a major wrestling show during the summer, most often in September, called Verano de Escándalo ("Summer of Scandal"). The Verano de Escándalo show was an annual event from 1997 until 2011, then AAA did not hold a show in 2012 and 2013 before bringing the show back in 2014, but this time in June, putting it at the time AAA previously held their Triplemanía show. In 2012 and 2013 Triplemanía XX and Triplemanía XXI was held in August instead of the early summer. The show often features championship matches or Lucha de Apuestas or bet matches where the competitors risked their wrestling mask or hair on the outcome of the match. In Lucha Libre the Lucha de Apuetas match is considered more prestigious than a championship match and a lot of the major shows feature one or more Apuesta matches. The 2006 Verano de Escándalo show was the tenth show in the series.

=== Storylines ===
The Verano de Escándalo show featured eight professional wrestling matches with different wrestlers involved in pre-existing, scripted feuds, plots, and storylines. Wrestlers were portrayed as either heels (referred to as rudos in Mexico, those that portray the "bad guys") or faces (técnicos in Mexico, the "good guy" characters) as they followed a series of tension-building events, which culminated in a wrestling match or series of matches.

== Results ==
No.	Results	Stipulations
1	Laredo Kid defeated Gran Apache and Kaoma Jr.	Three-way elimination Luchando por un Sueño tournament final match
2	El Elegido, Cinthia Moreno, Mascarita Sagrada, and Pimpinela Escarlata defeated Pirata Morgan, La Diabólica, Mini Abismo Negro, and Polvo de Estrellas by disqualification	Eight-man "Atómicos" tag team match
3	The Mexican Powers (Crazy Boy, Joe Líder, Juventud Guerrera, and Psicosis) defeated The Black Family (Chessman, Dark Cuervo, Dark Escoria, and Dark Ozz)	Six-man "Lucha Libre rules" tag team match in the 1st Round of the Torneo de Atómicos
4	Team TNA (Homicide, Low Ki, Samoa Joe, and A.J. Styles) defeated Vipers Revolution (Abismo Negro, Charly Manson, Electroshock, and Histeria) by disqualification	Eight-man "Atómicos" tag team match in the 1st Round of the Torneo de Atómicos
5	Estrellita and Tiffany (with El Elegido) defeated Traci Brooks and Tiana Ringer (with Christy Hemme and Muerte Cibernetica) by disqualification	Tag team match
6	Los Guapos (Alan Stone, Hator, Scorpio Jr., and Zumbido) defeated Brazo de Plata, El Intocable, El Oriental, and El Zorro	Eight-man "Atómicos" tag team match
7	Team TNA (Low-Ki, Samoa Joe, and A.J. Styles) defeated the Mexican Powers (Crazy Boy, Joe Líder, and Juventud Guerrera)	Six-man "Lucha Libre rules" tag team match in the Torneo de Atómicos final
8	Gronda, Octagón, and La Parka defeated La Legión Extranjera (Abyss, Jeff Jarrett, and Konnan) by disqualification	Six-man "Lucha Libre rules" tag team match

=== Luchando por un Sueño tournament ===
1st Round; Sin Limite; August 17–20, 2026 (Aired: September 3–10)
Gran Apache	Win
Pegasso	5:45
Police Man	8:36
Rey Cometa	Win
Chiva Rayada	Win
Paranoiko	4:26
Kaoma Jr.	Win
Super Fly	4:12
Laredo Kid	Win
Mr. Cóndor	7:30
Nemesis	6:23
Pesadilla	Win

Semifinals; Sin Limite; September 3, 2006 (Aired: September 17)
Gran Apache	Win
Rey Cometa	16:41
Chiva Rayada I	7:25
Kaoma Jr.	Win
Laredo Kid	Win
Pesadilla	9:34

Final; Sin Limite: Verano de Escándalo; September 17, 2006 (Aired: September 24)
Gran Apache	—
Kaoma Jr.	—
Laredo Kid	Win (Note: This was a three-way elimination match. Order of elimination: Kaoma Jr., Gran Apache)

=== Torneo de Atómicos ===
1st Round; Sin Limite: Verano de Escándalo; September 17, 2006 (Aired: September 24)
The Black Family (Chessman, Dark Cuervo, Dark Escoria, and Dark Ozz)	—
The Mexican Powers (Crazy Boy, Joe Líder, Juventud Guerrera, and Psicosis)	Pinfall
Team TNA (A.J. Styles, Homicide, Low Ki, and Samoa Joe)	Disqualification
Vipers Revolution (Abismo Negro, Charly Manson, Electroshock, and Histeria)	—

Final; Sin Limite: Verano de Escándalo; September 17, 2006 (Aired: October 1)
The Mexican Powers (Crazy Boy, Joe Líder, and Juventud Guerrera)	—
Team TNA (A.J. Styles, Low Ki, and Samoa Joe)	Pinfall
