= Verano de Escándalo (2005) =

2005 Lucha Libre AAA World Wide event

Verano de Escándalo 2005
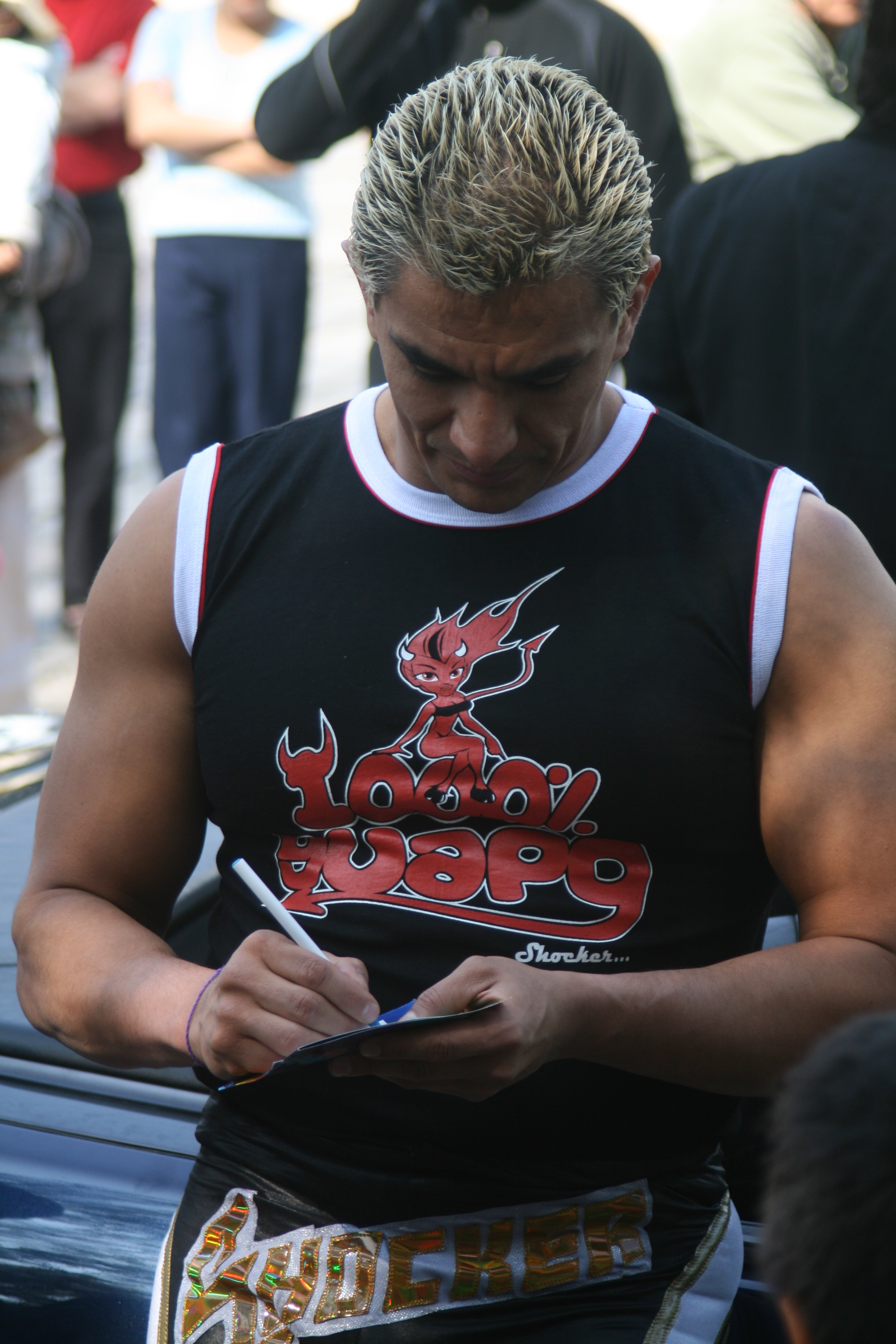
- Shocker, one of four men in the main event steel cage match
- Promotion: AAA
- Date: September 18, 2005
- City: Naucalpan, Mexico
- Venue: El Toreo
- Attendance: 15,000

Pay-per-view chronology
← Previous; Triplemanía XIII	Next → Guerra de Titanes

Verano de Escándalo chronology
← Previous; 2004	Next → 2006

Verano de Escándalo (2005) (Spanish for "Summer of Scandal") was the ninth annual Verano de Escándalo professional wrestling show promoted by AAA. The show took place on September 18, 2005, in Naucalpan. The main event featured an "electrified" steel cage match Lucha de Apuestas where the last man in the cage would have to remove his mask or have his hair shaved off. The participants were Cibernético, Chessman, Shocker, and Latin Lover.

== Production ==
=== Background ===
First held during the summer of 1997 the Mexican professional wrestling, company AAA began holding a major wrestling show during the summer, most often in September, called Verano de Escándalo ("Summer of Scandal"). The Verano de Escándalo show was an annual event from 1997 until 2011, then AAA did not hold a show in 2012 and 2013 before bringing the show back in 2014, but this time in June, putting it at the time AAA previously held their Triplemanía show. In 2012 and 2013 Triplemanía XX and Triplemanía XXI was held in August instead of the early summer. The show often features championship matches or Lucha de Apuestas or bet matches where the competitors risked their wrestling mask or hair on the outcome of the match. In Lucha Libre the Lucha de Apuetas match is considered more prestigious than a championship match and a lot of the major shows feature one or more Apuesta matches. The 2005 Verano de Escándalo show was the ninth show in the series.

=== Storylines ===
The Verano de Escándalo show featured seven professional wrestling matches with different wrestlers involved in pre-existing, scripted feuds, plots, and storylines. Wrestlers were portrayed as either heels (referred to as rudos in Mexico, those that portray the "bad guys") or faces (técnicos in Mexico, the "good guy" characters) as they followed a series of tension-building events, which culminated in a wrestling match or series of matches.

== Results ==
No.	Results	Stipulations
1	Los Kumbia Kids (Kevin, Jessy, and Javi) defeated Pentagón III and Los Diabolicos (Ángel Mortal and Mr. Condor)	Six-man "Lucha Libre rules" tag team match
2	Mascarita Sagrada, Octagoncito, and Rocky Marvin defeated Jerrito Estrada, Mini Abismo Negro, and Mini Psicosis	Six-man "Lucha Libre rules" tag team match
3	Cinthia Moreno, Estrellita, Martha Villalobos, and Pimpinela Escarlata defeated La Diabólica, La Hechicera, Tiffany, and May Flowers	Eight-man "Atómicos" tag team match
4	The Black Family (Cuervo, Escoria, and Ozz) and Gran Apache defeated Los Barrio Boys (Alan, Billy Boy, and Decnis) and the Laredo Kid by disqualification	"minis lumberjacks with belts" match
5	El Ángel, Antifaz del Norte, and Estrella Dorada Jr. defeated Hator, Nosawa, and Zumbido	Six-man "Lucha Libre rules" tag team match
6	La Parka, Vampiro, and El Zorro defeated Abismo Negro, Charly Manson, and Jeff Jarrett	Six-man "Lucha Libre rules" tag team match
7	Chessman lost to Cibernético, Shocker, and Latin Lover	Electrified steel cage match "Loser has his head shaved" match.
