= Verano de Escándalo (1999) =

1999 Lucha Libre AAA World Wide event

Verano de Escándalo 1999
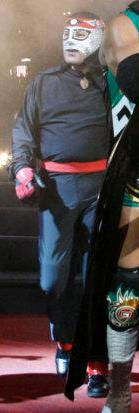
- Octagón wrestled in the main event
- Promotion: AAA
- Date: September 17, 1999
- City: Mexico City, Mexico
- Venue: Juan de la Barrera Gym
- Attendance: 4,021

Pay-per-view chronology
← Previous; Triplemanía VII	Next → Guerra de Titanes

Verano de Escándalo chronology
← Previous; 1998	Next → 2000

The 1999 Verano de Escándalo (Spanish for "Summer of Scandal") was the third annual Verano de Escándalo professional wrestling show promoted by AAA. The show took place on September 17, 1999, in Mexico City, Mexico. The Main event featured a Steel Cage Match Lucha de Apuestas where the loser would have to unmask or have his hair shaved off. The team of Heavy Metal and Octagón faced Jaque Mate and Kick Boxer.

== Production ==
=== Background ===
First held during the summer of 1997 the Mexican professional wrestling, company AAA began holding a major wrestling show during the summer, most often in September, called Verano de Escándalo ("Summer of Scandal"). The Verano de Escándalo show was an annual event from 1997 until 2011, then AAA did not hold a show in 2012 and 2013 before bringing the show back in 2014, but this time in June, putting it at the time AAA previously held their Triplemanía show. In 2012 and 2013 Triplemanía XX and Triplemanía XXI was held in August instead of the early summer. The show often features championship matches or Lucha de Apuestas or bet matches where the competitors risked their wrestling mask or hair on the outcome of the match. In Lucha Libre the Lucha de Apuetas match is considered more prestigious than a championship match and a lot of the major shows feature one or more Apuesta matches. The 1999 Verano de Escándalo show was the third show in the series.

=== Storylines ===
The Verano de Escándalo show featured six professional wrestling matches with different wrestlers involved in pre-existing, scripted feuds, plots, and storylines. Wrestlers were portrayed as either heels (referred to as rudos in Mexico, those that portray the "bad guys") or faces (técnicos in Mexico, the "good guy" characters) as they followed a series of tension-building events, which culminated in a wrestling match or series of matches.

== Results ==
No.	Results	Stipulations
1	Rossy Moreno, Xóchitl Hamada, and Miss Janeth defeated Cynthia, Alda, and Esther Moreno	Six-man "Lucha Libre rules" tag team match
2	Thai Boxer, Street Boxer, Antonio Silva, and Carlos Gutierrez defeated Los Vatos Locos (Charly Manson, Nygma, El Picudo, and May Flowers) by disqualification	Eight-man "Atómicos" tag team match
3	Abismo Negro, Electroshock, Pentagón II, and Gran Apache defeated El Alebrije, El Felino, Path Finder, and Oscar Sevilla by disqualification.	Eight-man "Atómicos" tag team match
4	Los Vipers (Mosco del la Merced, Histeria, Psicosis, and Maniaco) defeated Los Junior Atomicos (La Parka Jr., Perro Aguayo Jr., Blue Demon Jr., and Máscara Sagrada Jr.)	Eight-man "Atómicos" tag team match for the Mexican National Atomicos Championship
5	Canek, Perro Aguayo, and Latin Lover defeated Sangre Chicana, Cibernético, and Pirata Morgan	Six-man "Lucha Libre rules" tag team match
6	Heavy Metal and Octagón defeated Jaque Mate and Kick Boxer	Steel cage match Lucha de Apuestas, "loser loses mask or hair" match. Kick Boxer was unmasked due to his loss.
