= Verano de Escándalo (2001) =

2001 Lucha Libre AAA World Wide event

Verano de Escándalo 2001
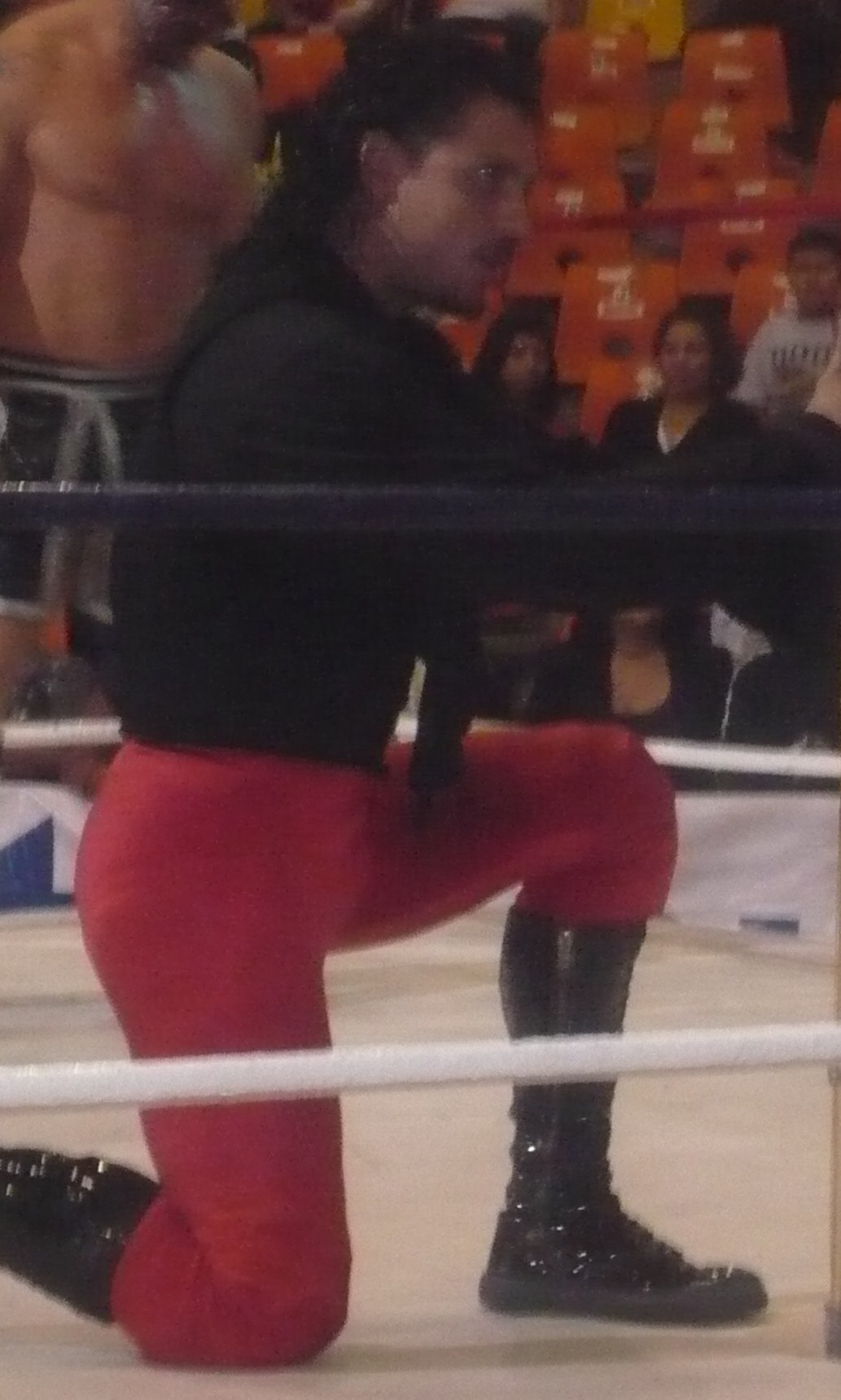
- El Zorro, part of the winning team in the main event.
- Promotion: AAA
- Date: September 16, 2001
- City: Naucalpan, Mexico
- Venue: El Toreo
- Attendance: 18,000

Pay-per-view chronology
← Previous; Triplemanía IX	Next → Guerra de Titanes

Verano de Escándalo chronology
← Previous; 2000	Next → 2002

The 2001 Verano de Escándalo (Spanish for "Summer of Scandal") was the fifth annual Verano de Escándalo professional wrestling show promoted by AAA. The show took place on September 16, 2001, in Naucalpan, Mexico. The main event featured an eight-man "Atómicos" tag team match between the team of Canek, Zorro, Latin Lover, and Heavy Metal facing the team of Cibernético, Headhunter I, Electroshock, and Abismo Negro.

== Production ==
=== Background ===
First held during the summer of 1997 the Mexican professional wrestling, company AAA began holding a major wrestling show during the summer, most often in September, called Verano de Escándalo ("Summer of Scandal"). The Verano de Escándalo show was an annual event from 1997 until 2011, then AAA did not hold a show in 2012 and 2013 before bringing the show back in 2014, but this time in June, putting it at the time AAA previously held their Triplemanía show. In 2012 and 2013 Triplemanía XX and Triplemanía XXI was held in August instead of the early summer. The show often features championship matches or Lucha de Apuestas or bet matches where the competitors risked their wrestling mask or hair on the outcome of the match. In Lucha Libre the Lucha de Apuetas match is considered more prestigious than a championship match and a lot of the major shows feature one or more Apuesta matches. The 2001 Verano de Escándalo show was the sixth show in the series.

=== Storylines ===
The Verano de Escándalo show featured eight professional wrestling matches with different wrestlers involved in pre-existing, scripted feuds, plots, and storylines. Wrestlers were portrayed as either heels (referred to as rudos in Mexico, those that portray the "bad guys") or faces (técnicos in Mexico, the "good guy" characters) as they followed a series of tension-building events, which culminated in a wrestling match or series of matches.

== Results ==
No.	Results	Stipulations
1	Octagoncito, Mascarita Sagrada, and La Parkita defeated Mini Psicosis, Mini Abismo Negro, and Rocky Marvin	Six-man "Lucha Libre rules" tag team match
2	Los Barrio Boys (Alan, Billy Boy, and Decnis) vs. Milano Collection AT, Nitohei Oyanagi, and Yasushi Tsujimoto ended in a draw	Six-man "Lucha Libre rules" tag team match
3	Los Vatos Locos (Espiritu, Nygma, Silver Cat and El Picudo) defeated Los Vipers (Psicosis, Histeria, Maniaco, and Mosco de la Merced), Los Exoticos (May Flowers, Polvo de Estrella, Cassandro, and ??) and the Black Family (Charly Manson, Ozz, Cuervo, and Escoria)	Elimination tag team match
4	La Parka Jr., Máscara Sagrada, Sangre Chicana, and Octagón defeated Pirata Morgan, El Texano, Jerry Estrada, and El Engendro by disqualifiation	Eight-man "Atómicos" tag team match
5	El Alebrije, Super Crazy, and Randy defeated Máscara Maligna, Pentagón III, and Monsther	Six-man "Lucha Libre rules" tag team match
6	Pimpinela Escarlata vs. Tiffany ended in a draw	Lucha de Apuestas "hair vs. hair" match. As a result, both had their heads shaved.
7	Héctor Garza defeated Perro Aguayo Jr.	Dog collar match
8	Canek, Zorro, Latin Lover, and Heavy Metal defeated Cibernético, Headhunter I, Electroshock, and Abismo Negro	Eight-man "Atómicos" tag team match
