= Verano de Escándalo (2007) =

2007 Lucha Libre AAA World Wide event

Verano de Escándalo 2007
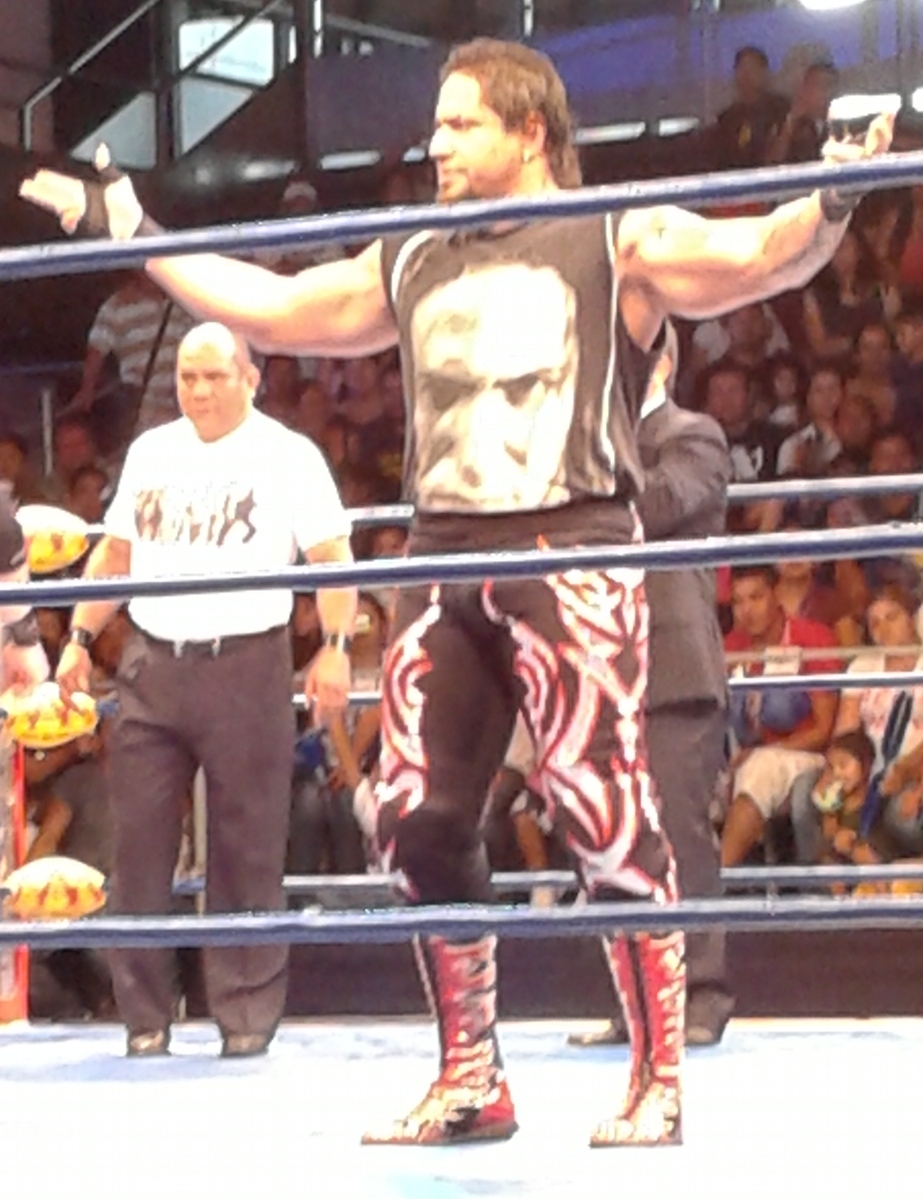
- El Mesias who became the first AAA Mega Champion at Verano de Escándalo
- Promotion: Asistencia Asesoría y Administración
- Date: September 16, 2007
- City: Guadalajara, Jalisco, Mexico
- Venue: Plaza de Toros "Nuevo Pregreso
- Attendance: 18,000-22,000

Pay-per-view chronology
← Previous; Triplemanía XV	Next → Antonio Peña Memorial Show

Verano de Escándalo chronology
← Previous; 2006	Next → 2008

Verano de Escándalo (2007) (Spanish for "Summer of Scandal") was the eleventh annual Verano de Escándalo professional wrestling show promoted by Asistencia Asesoría y Administración (AAA). The show took place on September 16, 2007 in Guadalajara, Jalisco, Mexico. The main event featured a Domo De La Muerte cage match (Dome of Death) where the last person in the cage would have his hair shaved off. The participants were the team of "Los Hell Brothers" (Charly Manson, Chessman, Cibernético) along with El Zorro taking on the Black Family (Dark Cuervo, Dark Escoria, Dark Espíritu and Dark Ozz).

== Production ==
=== Background ===
In 1997, the Mexican professional wrestling, company Asistencia Asesoría y Administración (AAA, or Triple A; Spanish for "Assistance, Consulting, and Administration") began holding a major wrestling show during the summer, most often in September, called Verano de Escándalo ("Summer of Scandal"). Verano de Escándalo was an annual event from 1997 until 2011. AAA did not hold a show in 2012 and 2013 before bringing it back in 2014, this time in June, scheduling it at the time AAA previously held their Triplemanía show. In 2012 and 2013, Triplemanía XX and Triplemanía XXI were held in August instead of the early summer. The event often features championship matches or Lucha de Apuestas or bet matches where the competitors put their wrestling mask or hair on the line. In Lucha Libre, the Lucha de Apuestas match is considered more prestigious than a championship match and many major shows feature one or more Apuesta matches. The 2007 Verano de Escándalo show was the 11th show in the series.

=== Storylines ===
The Verano de Escándalo event featured six professional wrestling matches with different wrestlers involved in pre-existing, scripted storylines. Wrestlers portrayed heels (referred to as rudos in Mexico) or faces (técnicos) through a series of tension-building events, which culminated in a wrestling match or series of matches.

== Aftermath ==
After the event it was announced that El Mesias had suffered an injury during the AAA World Title match, which forced a disqualification ending instead of the originally planned ending. El Mesias was out of action for over a month, receiving physical therapy for his sciatica, but was not stripped of the title during his inactivity.

== Results ==
No.	Results	Stipulations	Times
1	Alfa, Pirata Morgan, Faby Apache and Mini Chessman defeated Aero Star, Rey Cometa, Estrellita and Octagóncito	Eight-man "Atómicos" tag team match	11:59
2	The Mexican Powers (Crazy Boy, Extreme Tiger, Joe Líder and Juventud Guerrera) defeated Los Vipers Revolution (Antifaz del Norte, Histeria, Mr. Niebla and Psicosis)	Eight-man "Atómicos" tag team match	16:50
3	Los Guapos VIP (Decnis, Scorpio Jr. and Zumbido) defeated Los Bello Stones (Super Caló, Alan and Chris Stone)	Six-man "Lucha Libre rules" tag team match	14:57
4	The Laredo Kid, Latin Lover, La Parka and Ricky Marvin defeated La Legión Extranjera (Abismo Negro, Ron Killings, Kenzo Suzuki and Sean Waltman)	Eight-man "Atómicos" tag team match	17:09
5	El Mesias defeated Chessman by disqualification	Singles match finals in the AAA Mega Championship tournament.	—
6	Dark Espiritu lost to Cibernético; Also in the match: Los Hell Brothers (Charly Manson, Chessman) and El Zorro, the Black Family (Dark Cuervo, Dark Escoria and Dark Ozz)	Domo De La Muerte cage match. Espiritu was the last in the cage and had his head shaved bald.	15:50

Order of escape

#	Escape	Time
1	El Zorro	06:39
2	Charly Manson	09:01
3	Dark Ozz	12:56
4	Chessman	12:56
5	Dark Cuervo	12:56
6	Dark Escoria	12:56
7	Cibernético	15:50
8	Dark Espiritu	Loser
