= Guerra de Titanes (2001) =

2001 Lucha Libre AAA World Wide event

Guerra de Titanes 2001
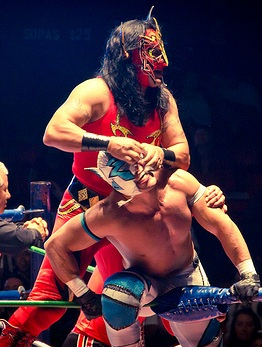
- Psicosis (in red) teamed with his Los Vipers team mates at the show
- Promotion: AAA
- Date: November 23, 2001
- City: Mexico City, Mexico
- Venue: Plaza de Toros
- Attendance: 15,000

Pay-per-view chronology
← Previous; Verano de Escándalo	Next → Rey de Reyes

Guerra de Titanes chronology
← Previous; 2000	Next → 2002

Guerra de Titanes (2001) ("War of the Titans") was the fifth Guerra de Titanes professional wrestling show promoted by AAA. The show took place on November 23, 2001 in Mexico City, Mexico. The Main event featured a "Four Way" Elimination Lucha de Apuestas which meant that the loser would have his hair shaved off. The participants were Heavy Metal lost to Perro Aguayo Jr., Héctor Garza and Latin Lover, who had all competed in the main event of Guerra de Titanes 2000 as well.

== Production ==
=== Background ===
Starting in 1997 the Mexican professional wrestling, company AAA has held a major wrestling show late in the year, either November or December, called Guerra de Titanes ("War of the Titans") . The show often features championship matches or Lucha de Apuestas or bet matches where the competitors risked their wrestling mask or hair on the outcome of the match. In Lucha Libre the Lucha de Apuetas match is considered more prestigious than a championship match and a lot of the major shows feature one or more Apuesta matches. The Guerra de Titanes show is hosted by a new location each year, emanating from cities such as Madero, Chihuahua, Chihuahua, Mexico City, Guadalajara, Jalisco and more. The 2001 Guerra de Titanes show was the fifth show in the series.

=== Storylines ===
The Guerra de Titanes show featured eight professional wrestling matches with different wrestlers involved in pre-existing, scripted feuds, plots, and storylines. Wrestlers were portrayed as either heels (referred to as rudos in Mexico, those that portray the "bad guys") or faces (técnicos in Mexico, the "good guy" characters) as they followed a series of tension-building events, which culminated in a wrestling match or series of matches.

== Results ==
No.	Results	Stipulations	Times
1	Esther Moreno, Estrellita and Princesa Sujei defeated Martha Villalobos, Mujer Demente and Tiffany	Six-man "Lucha Libre rules" tag team match	09:11
2	Los Ice Creams and Los Barrio Boys (Alan and Billy Boy defeated Policeman and Los Diabolicos (Ángel Mortal, Mr. Condor and Gallego)	Eight-man "Atómicos" tag team match	11:00
3	Los Vatos Locos (Picudo, Espiritu, Silver Cat and Nygma) defeated Los Vipers (Psicosis, Maniaco, Histeria and Mosco de la Merced) (c)	Eight-man "Atómicos" tag team match for the Mexican National Atómicos Championship	23:12
4	El Zorro, Pimpinela Escarlata, Octagoncito and Lady Apache defeated Electroshock, Polvo de Estrellas, Mini Psicosis and Tiffany by disqualification	Eight-man "Atómicos" tag team match	08:34
5	Octagón, El Alebrije and Randy defeated the Monsther, Pentagón (III) and Darkness by disqualification	Six-man "Lucha Libre rules" tag team match	11:11
6	Canek, Dos Caras Jr., La Parka and Máscara Sagráda defeated Jerry Estrada, Pirata Morgan, El Texano and Sangre Chicana by disqualification	Eight-man "Atómicos" tag team match	08:45
7	Cibernético defeated Antonio Peña	Singles match	02:45
8	Heavy Metal lost to Perro Aguayo Jr., Héctor Garza and Latin Lover	Luchas de Apuestas "loser loses his hair elimination" match. As a result Heavy Metal had his hair shaved off.	12:21
(c) / – the champion(s) heading into the match
