= Verano de Escándalo (1998) =

1998 Lucha Libre AAA World Wide event

Verano de Escándalo 1998
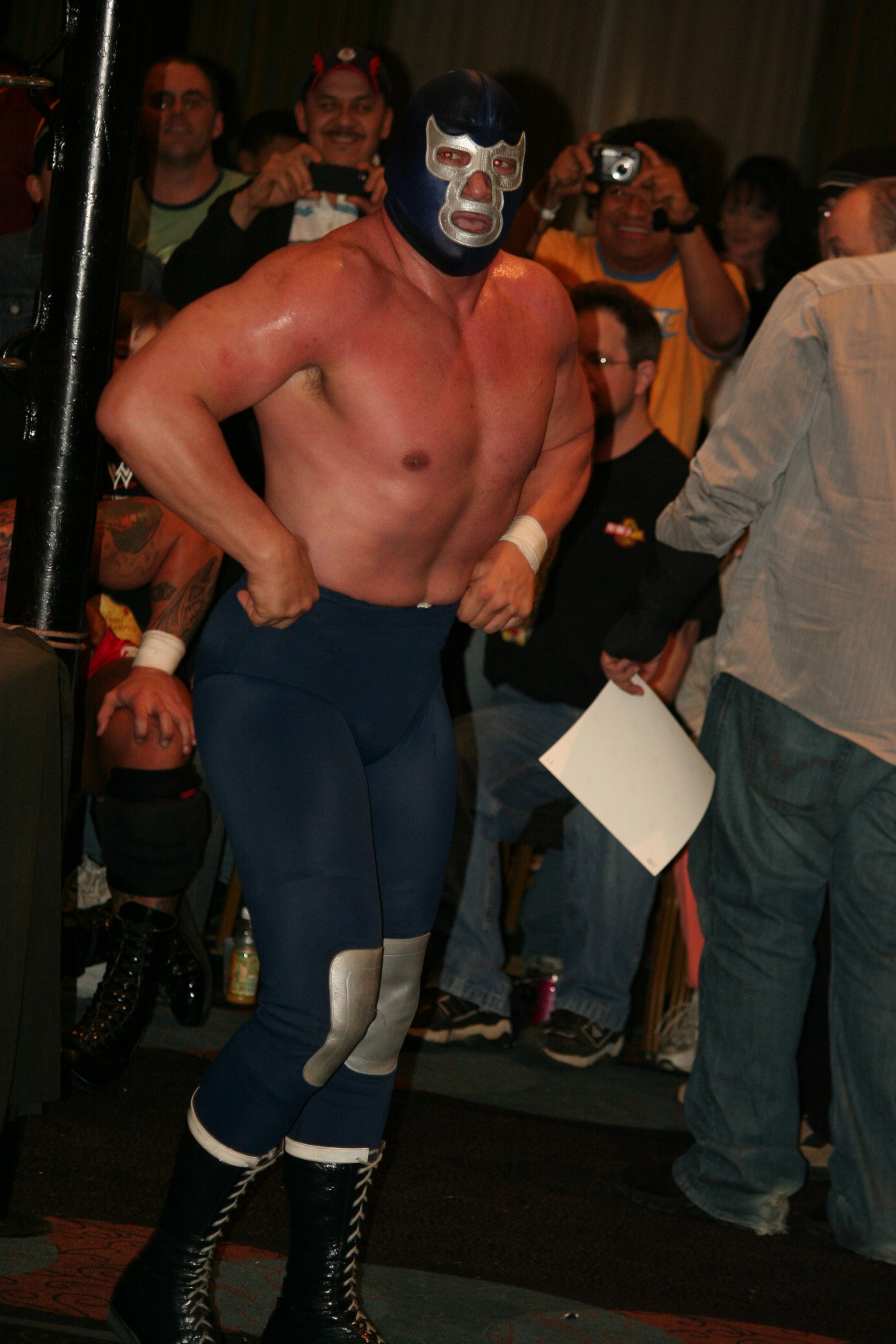
- Blue Demon Jr., along with Heavy Metal, won the main event
- Promotion: AAA
- Date: September 18, 1998
- City: Madero, Tamaulipas, Mexico
- Attendance: 12,000

Pay-per-view chronology
← Previous; Triplemanía VI	Next → Guerra de Titanes

Verano de Escándalo chronology
← Previous; 1997	Next → 1999

The 1998 Verano de Escándalo (Spanish for "Summer of Scandal") was the second annual Verano de Escandalo professional wrestling show promoted by AAA. The show took place on September 18, 1998, in Madero, Tamaulipas, Mexico. The main event featured steel cage match between the teams of Heavy Metal and Blue Demon Jr. and Kick Boxer and Abismo Negro. The stipulation of the main event was that if the team of Heavy Metal and Blue Demon Jr. lost referee Guicho Dominguez would be referee El Tirante's "slave" for a week. If Kick Boxer and Abismo Negro lost El Tirantes would be Guicho Dominguez's slave for a week.

== Production ==
=== Background ===
First held during the summer of 1997 the Mexican professional wrestling, company AAA began holding a major wrestling show during the summer, most often in September, called Verano de Escándalo ("Summer of Scandal"). The Verano de Escándalo show was an annual event from 1997 until 2011, then AAA did not hold a show in 2012 and 2013 before bringing the show back in 2014, but this time in June, putting it at the time AAA previously held their Triplemanía show. In 2012 and 2013 Triplemanía XX and Triplemanía XXI was held in August instead of the early summer. The show often features championship matches or Lucha de Apuestas or bet matches where the competitors risked their wrestling mask or hair on the outcome of the match. In Lucha Libre the Lucha de Apuetas match is considered more prestigious than a championship match and a lot of the major shows feature one or more Apuesta matches. The 1998 Verano de Escándalo show was the second show in the series.

=== Storylines ===
The Verano de Escándalo show featured six professional wrestling matches with different wrestlers involved in pre-existing, scripted feuds, plots, and storylines. Wrestlers were portrayed as either heels (referred to as rudos in Mexico, those that portray the "bad guys") or faces (técnicos in Mexico, the "good guy" characters) as they followed a series of tension-building events, which culminated in a wrestling match or series of matches.

== Results ==
No.	Results	Stipulations
1	Los Kamkazes (Goku, Lyguila, Tobikage, and Zhiraya) defeated Los Insectos (Avispa, Abjeca, Hormiga, and El Mosca)	Eight-man "Atómicos" tag team match
2	Los Vatos Locos (El Picudo, Charly Manson, Nygma, and May Flowers) defeated Los Vipers (Histeria, Psicosis, Mosco de la Merced, and Maniaco) by disqualification	Eight-man "Atómicos" tag team match
3	Alda Moreno and Miss Janeth defeated Rossy Moreno and Xóchitl Hamada	Lucha de Apuestas, "Hair vs. Hair" match; as a result, Rossy Moreno had her head shaved bald.
4	Octagón, Pentagón, and El Alebrije defeated Electroshock, Killer, and Heavy Dracula by disqualification	Six-man "Lucha Libre rules" tag team match
5	Latin Lover, La Parka Jr., Perro Aguayo Jr., and Perro Aguayo defeated Cibernético, Sangre Chicana, Cobarde Jr., and El Cobarde II	Eight-man "Atómicos" tag team match
6	Heavy Metal and Blue Demon Jr. defeated Kick Boxer and Abismo Negro	Steel cage match; as a result, Tirantes had to be Guicho Dominguez's slave for a week.
