= Verano de Escándalo (1997) =

1997 Lucha Libre AAA World Wide event

Verano de Escándalo 1997
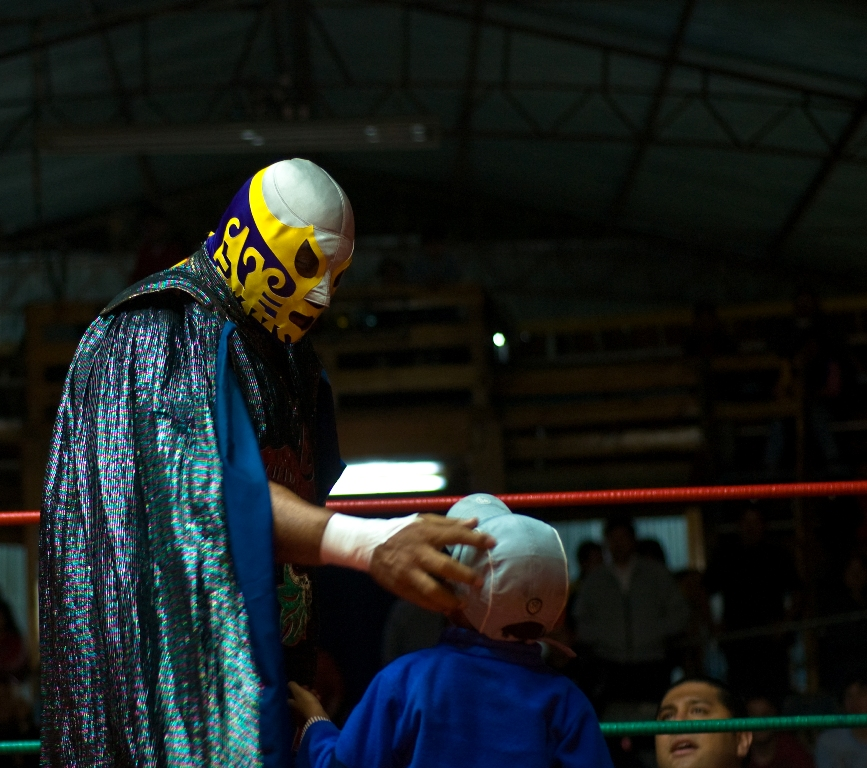
- El Canek, wrestled in a steel cage match
- Promotion: AAA
- Date: September 14, 1997
- City: Tonalá, Jalisco, Mexico
- Venue: Río Nilo Coliseum
- Attendance: 18,500

Pay-per-view chronology
← Previous; Triplemanía V-B	Next → Guerra de Titanes

Verano de Escándalo chronology
← Previous; First	Next → 1998

The 1997 Verano de Escándalo (Spanish for "Summer of Scandal") was the first ever Verano de Escándalo professional wrestling show promoted by AAA. The show took place on September 14, 1997, in Tonalá, Jalisco, Mexico. The Main event featured a Steel Cage Elimination Match, Lucha de Apuestas which meant that the last man left in the cage would have his hair shaved off. The two teams in the cage match were Perro Aguayo, Perro Aguayo Jr. and Heavy Metal facing Sangre Chicana, El Picudo and El Cobarde II.

== Production ==
=== Background ===
First held during the summer of 1997 the Mexican professional wrestling, company AAA began holding a major wrestling show during the summer, most often in September, called Verano de Escándalo ("Summer of Scandal"). The Verano de Escándalo show was an annual event from 1997 until 2011, then AAA did not hold a show in 2012 and 2013 before bringing the show back in 2014, but this time in June, putting it at the time AAA previously held their Triplemanía show. In 2012 and 2013 Triplemanía XX and Triplemanía XXI was held in August instead of the early summer. The show often features championship matches or Lucha de Apuestas or bet matches where the competitors risked their wrestling mask or hair on the outcome of the match. In Lucha Libre the Lucha de Apuetas match is considered more prestigious than a championship match and a lot of the major shows feature one or more Apuesta matches. The 1997 Verano de Escándalo show was the first show in the series.

=== Storylines ===
The Verano de Escándalo show featured five professional wrestling matches with different wrestlers involved in pre-existing, scripted feuds, plots, and storylines. Wrestlers were portrayed as either heels (referred to as rudos in Mexico, those that portray the "bad guys") or faces (técnicos in Mexico, the "good guy" characters) as they followed a series of tension-building events, which culminated in a wrestling match or series of matches.

== Results ==
No.	Results	Stipulations
1	Martha Villalobs and Sexi Boom defeated Xóchitl Hamada and La Practicante	Relevos Suicidas tag team match
2	Xóchitl Hamada defeated La Practicante	Lucha de Apuestas "Hair vs. Hair" match
3	Octagón, Máscara Sagrada Jr. and Latin Lover defeated Fuerza Guerrera, Killer and Blue Panther	Six-man "Lucha Libre rules" tag team match
4	Canek defeated Cibernético	Steel cage match
5	Perro Aguayo, Perro Aguayo Jr. and Heavy Metal defeated Sangre Chicano, El Picudo and El Cobarde II	Steel Cage Elimination Match, Lucha de Apuestas; as the last man in the cage, Cobarde II had his head shaved after the match.
