= Verano de Escándalo (2009) =

2009 Lucha Libre AAA World Wide event

Verano de Escándalo 2009
- Promotion: AAA
- Date: August 21, 2009
- City: Ciudad Madero, Tamaulipas, Mexico
- Venue: Centro de Convenciones de Ciudad Madero
- Tagline(s): Los ánimos están calientes (The spirits are hot)

Pay-per-view chronology
← Previous; Triplemanía XVII	Next → Héroes Inmortales III

Verano de Escándalo chronology
← Previous; 2008	Next → 2010

Verano de Escándalo (2009) was a professional wrestling event produced by AAA, which took place on August 21, 2009 in Ciudad Madero, Tamaulipas, Mexico. It was the 13th event in the Verano de Escándalo chronology and featured seven matches.

== Production ==
=== Background ===
First held during the summer of 1997 the Mexican professional wrestling, company AAA began holding a major wrestling show during the summer, most often in September, called Verano de Escándalo ("Summer of Scandal"). The Verano de Escándalo show was an annual event from 1997 until 2011, then AAA did not hold a show in 2012 and 2013 before bringing the show back in 2014, but this time in June, putting it at the time AAA previously held their Triplemanía show. In 2012 and 2013 Triplemanía XX and Triplemanía XXI was held in August instead of the early summer. The show often features championship matches or Lucha de Apuestas or bet matches where the competitors risked their wrestling mask or hair on the outcome of the match. In Lucha Libre the Lucha de Apuetas match is considered more prestigious than a championship match and a lot of the major shows feature one or more Apuesta matches. The 2009 Verano de Escándalo show was the 13th show in the series.

=== Storylines ===
The Verano de Escándalo show featured seven professional wrestling matches with different wrestlers involved in pre-existing, scripted feuds, plots, and storylines. Wrestlers were portrayed as either heels (referred to as rudos in Mexico, those that portray the "bad guys") or faces (técnicos in Mexico, the "good guy" characters) as they followed a series of tension-building events, which culminated in a wrestling match or series of matches.

== Results ==
No.	Results	Stipulations
1	Los Psycho Circus (Murder Clown, Psycho Clown and Monster Clown) defeated La Yakuza (Kenzo Suzuki, El Oriental and Sugi San)	Six-man "Lucha Libre rules" tag team match
2	Alex Koslov defeated Extreme Tiger (c), Jack Evans, Rocky Romero and Teddy Hart	Five-way elimination match for the AAA Cruiserweight Championship.
3	La Hermandad 187 (Nicho El Millonario and Joe Líder) defeated El Elegido and Gronda II following interference by Grond XXX	Hardcore match
4	Los Wagnermaniacos (Silver King, Electroshock and Ultimo Gladiador) defeated La Parka, Marco Corleone and Octagón	Six-man "Lucha Libre rules" tag team match
5	Charly Manson defeated Chessman by submission	Streetfight
6	Billy Boy lost to Faby Apache, Sexy Star and Aero Star	Steel Cage Match, Luchas de Apuestas, "hair/mask" match.
7	Dr. Wagner Jr. (c) defeated El Mesias and Cibernético	Steel cage match for the AAA Mega Championship.
(c) / – the champion(s) heading into the match

== See also ==
- Verano de Escándalo
- Asistencia Asesoría y Administración
