= Guerra de Titanes (2000) =

2000 Lucha Libre AAA World Wide event

Guerra de Titanes 2000
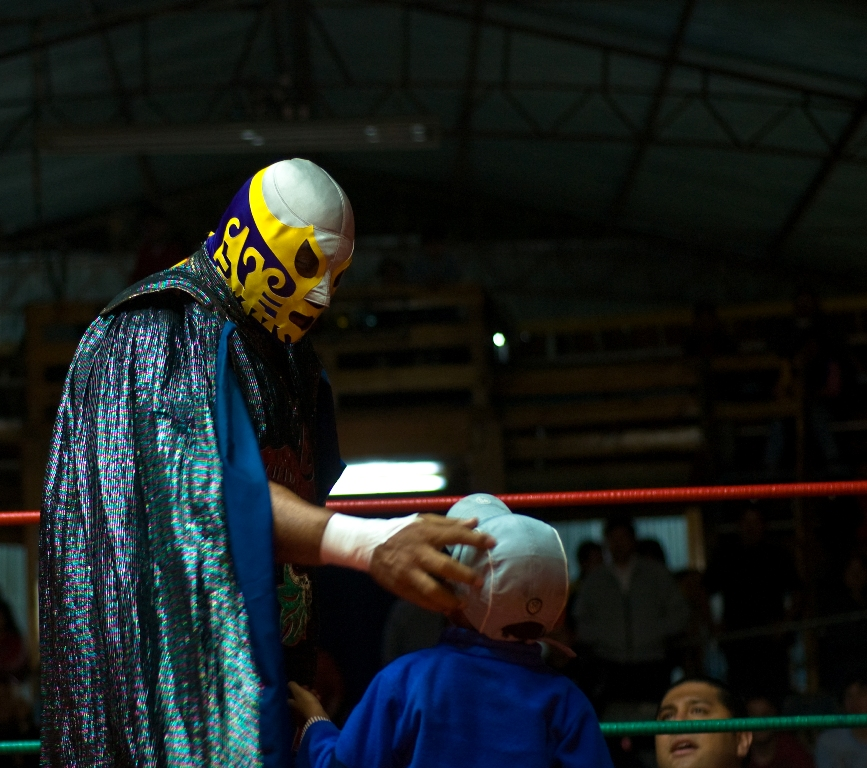
- Canek, teamed with Dos Caras, and Máscara Sagráda in the third match of the night
- Promotion: AAA
- Date: December 8, 2000
- City: Madero, Mexico
- Venue: Convention Center
- Attendance: 13.500

Pay-per-view chronology
← Previous; Verano de Escándalo	Next → Rey de Reyes

Guerra de Titanes chronology
← Previous; 1999	Next → 2001

Guerra de Titanes (2000) ("War of the Titans") was the fourth Guerra de Titanes professional wrestling show promoted by AAA. The show took place on December 8, 2000 in Madero, Mexico. The Main event featured an "Extreme" Steel Cage Match Tag Team match that featured Héctor Garza and Latin Lover taking on Heavy Metal and Perro Aguayo Jr.

== Production ==
=== Background ===
Starting in 1997 the Mexican professional wrestling, company AAA has held a major wrestling show late in the year, either November or December, called Guerra de Titanes ("War of the Titans"). The show often features championship matches or Lucha de Apuestas or bet matches where the competitors risked their wrestling mask or hair on the outcome of the match. In Lucha Libre the Lucha de Apuetas match is considered more prestigious than a championship match and a lot of the major shows feature one or more Apuesta matches. The Guerra de Titanes show is hosted by a new location each year, emanating from cities such as Madero, Chihuahua, Chihuahua, Mexico City, Guadalajara, Jalisco and more. The 2000 Guerra de Titanes show was the fourth show in the series.

=== Storylines ===
The Guerra de Titanes show featured five professional wrestling matches with different wrestlers involved in pre-existing, scripted feuds, plots, and storylines. Wrestlers were portrayed as either heels (referred to as rudos in Mexico, those that portray the "bad guys") or faces (técnicos in Mexico, the "good guy" characters) as they followed a series of tension-building events, which culminated in a wrestling match or series of matches.

== Results ==
No.	Results	Stipulations
1	Los Vatos Locos (Picudo, Nygma, May Flowers and Espiritu) defeated Los Spice Boys (Billy, Alan, Vangelis and Randy)	Eight-man "Atómicos" tag team match
2	Octagón, La Parka, Dos Caras Jr. and Hong Kong Lee defeated Pirata Morgan, El Texano, El Cobarde, and Espectro Jr. by disqualification	Eight-man "Atómicos" tag team match
3	Canek, Dos Caras, and Máscara Sagráda defeated Jerry Estrada and The Headhunters (A and B) by disqualification	Six-man "Lucha Libre rules" tag team match
4	Abismo Negro vs. Cibernético ended in a no contest	Steel cage match
5	Héctor Garza and Latin Lover defeated Heavy Metal and Perro Aguayo Jr.	"Extreme" steel cage match
