= Verano de Escándalo (2002) =

2002 Lucha Libre AAA World Wide event

Verano de Escándalo 2002
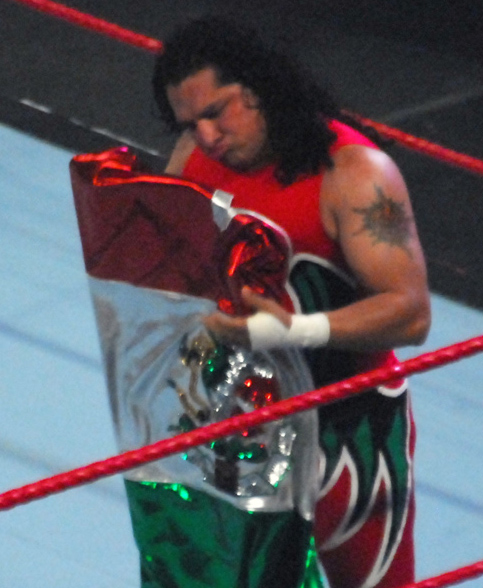
- Super Crazy, part of the semi-main event match.
- Promotion: AAA
- Date: September 16, 2002
- City: Naucalpan, Mexico
- Venue: El Toreo
- Attendance: 18,000

Pay-per-view chronology
← Previous; Triplemanía X	Next → Guerra de Titanes

Verano de Escándalo chronology
← Previous; 2001	Next → 2003

The 2002 Verano de Escándalo (Spanish for "Summer of Scandal") was the sixth annual Verano de Escándalo professional wrestling show promoted by AAA. The show took place on September 16, 2002, in Naucalpan, Mexico, like the previous year'sevent. The main event featured a Luchas de Apuestas elimination match where the loser would have his hair shaved off. The participants were El Dandy, El Zorro, and Perro Aguayo Jr.

== Production ==
=== Background ===
First held during the summer of 1997 the Mexican professional wrestling, company AAA began holding a major wrestling show during the summer, most often in September, called Verano de Escándalo ("Summer of Scandal"). The Verano de Escándalo show was an annual event from 1997 until 2011, then AAA did not hold a show in 2012 and 2013 before bringing the show back in 2014, but this time in June, putting it at the time AAA previously held their Triplemanía show. In 2012 and 2013 Triplemanía XX and Triplemanía XXI was held in August instead of the early summer. The show often features championship matches or Lucha de Apuestas or bet matches where the competitors risked their wrestling mask or hair on the outcome of the match. In Lucha Libre the Lucha de Apuetas match is considered more prestigious than a championship match and a lot of the major shows feature one or more Apuesta matches. The 2002 Verano de Escándalo show was the sixth show in the series.

=== Storylines ===
The Verano de Escándalo show featured seven professional wrestling matches with different wrestlers involved in pre-existing, scripted feuds, plots, and storylines. Wrestlers were portrayed as either heels (referred to as rudos in Mexico, those that portray the "bad guys") or faces (técnicos in Mexico, the "good guy" characters) as they followed a series of tension-building events, which culminated in a wrestling match or series of matches.

== Results ==
No.	Results	Stipulations
1	El Oriental, Pimpinela Escarlata, Mascarita Sagrada 2000, and Esther Moreno defeated Gran Apache, Polvo de Estrellas, Mini Abismo Negro, and Fabi Apache	Eight-man "Atómicos" tag team match
2	Los Vatos Locos (Picudo, Nygma, Espiritu, and Silver Cat) defeated the Black Family (Cuervo, Ozz, Chessman, and Escoria) (c)	Eight-man "Atómicos" tag team match for the Mexican National Atómicos Championship
3	Gronda, El Hijo del Solitario, and Dos Caras Jr. defeated Los Consagrados (Pirata Morgan, Sangre Chicana, and El Brazo)	Six-man "Lucha Libre rules" tag team match
4	Máscara Sagrada, El Alebrije, and Octagón defeated Psicosis, Monsther and Jason the Terrible by disqualification	Six-man "Lucha Libre rules" tag team match
5	Super Crazy, Mr. Águila, Latin Lover, and La Parka Jr. defeated Heavy Metal, Héctor Garza, Cibernético, and Leatherface by disqualification	Eight-man "Atómicos" tag team match
6	El Dandy lost to Electroshock, El Zorro, and Perro Aguayo Jr.	Elimination match Lucha de Apuestas hair vs. hair match
(c) / – the champion(s) heading into the match
