= Verano de Escándalo (2000) =

2000 Lucha Libre AAA World Wide event

Verano de Escándalo 2000
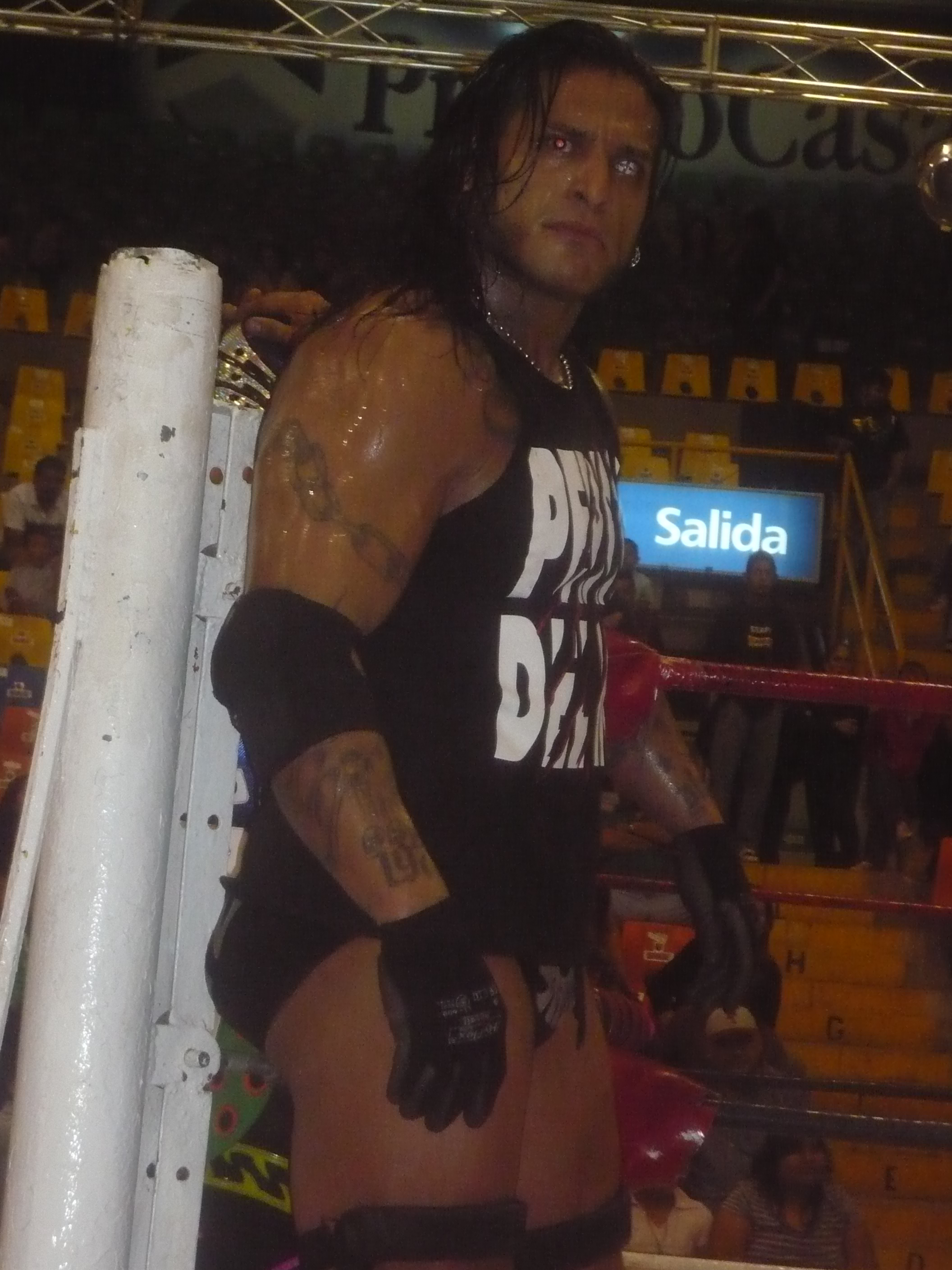
- Cibernético, who lost to Abismo Negro in the semi-final match
- Promotion: AAA
- Date: September 29, 2000
- City: Ciudad Madero, Mexico
- Venue: Convention Center
- Attendance: 15,000

Pay-per-view chronology
← Previous; Triplemanía VIII	Next → Guerra de Titanes

Verano de Escándalo chronology
← Previous; 1999	Next → 2001

The 2000 Verano de Escándalo (Spanish for "Summer of Scandal") was the fourth annual Verano de Escándalo professional wrestling show promoted by AAA. The show took place on September 29, 2000, in Madero, Mexico. The main event featured a tag team match that saw Heavy Metal and Perro Aguayo Jr. face off against Latin Lover and Héctor Garza.

== Production ==
=== Background ===
First held during the summer of 1997 the Mexican professional wrestling, company AAA began holding a major wrestling show during the summer, most often in September, called Verano de Escándalo ("Summer of Scandal"). The Verano de Escándalo show was an annual event from 1997 until 2011, then AAA did not hold a show in 2012 and 2013 before bringing the show back in 2014, but this time in June, putting it at the time AAA previously held their Triplemanía show. In 2012 and 2013 Triplemanía XX and Triplemanía XXI was held in August instead of the early summer. The show often features championship matches or Lucha de Apuestas or bet matches where the competitors risked their wrestling mask or hair on the outcome of the match. In Lucha Libre the Lucha de Apuetas match is considered more prestigious than a championship match and a lot of the major shows feature one or more Apuesta matches. The 2000 Verano de Escándalo show was the fourth show in the series.

=== Storylines ===
The Verano de Escándalo show featured seven professional wrestling matches with different wrestlers involved in pre-existing, scripted feuds, plots, and storylines. Wrestlers were portrayed as either heels (referred to as rudos in Mexico, those that portray the "bad guys") or faces (técnicos in Mexico, the "good guy" characters) as they followed a series of tension-building events, which culminated in a wrestling match or series of matches.

== Results ==
No.	Results	Stipulations
1	Octagóncito, Mascarita Sagrada, and Mini Path Finder defeated Mini Abismo Negro, Mini Psicosis, and Rocky Marvin by disqualification	Six-man "Lucha Libre rules" tag team match
2	Oscar Sevilla, Ludxor, Path Finder, and Pegasso defeated Gran Apache and Los Diablicos (Mr. Condor, Marabunta, and Ángel Mortal)	Eight-man "Atómicos" tag team match
3	Alda Moreno, Lady Apache, and Ayako Hamada defeated Aja Kong, Miss Janeth, and Tiffany	Six-woman "Lucha Libre rules" tag team match
4	Los Vatos Locos (Charley Manson, Nygma, May Flowers and El Picudo) vs. Los Vipers (Maniaco, Histeria, Psicosis and Mosco de la Merced) ended in a double countout	Eight-man "Atómicos" tag team match
5	Sangre Chicana, El Alebrije, La Parka Jr., and Dos Caras Jr. defeated El Texano, Pirata Morgan, Espectro Jr., and El Cobarde II	Eight-man "Atómicos" tag team match
6	Abismo Negro defeated Cibernético	Singles match
7	Heavy Metal and Perro Aguayo Jr. defeated Latin Lover and Héctor Garza by disqualification	Tag team match
