= Verano de Escándalo (2021) =

2021 Lucha Libre AAA Worldwide event

- Promotional poster featuring various AAA luchadores and luchadoras
- Promotion: Lucha Libre AAA Worldwide
- Date: July 3, 2021
- City: Tequisquiapan, Querétaro, Mexico
- Venue: Unknown
- Attendance: 0 (behind closed doors) (Note: The event was held without an audience due to the COVID-19 pandemic in Mexico.)

Event chronology
← Previous; Rey de Reyes	Next → Triplemanía XXIX

Verano de Escándalo chronology
← Previous; 2019	Next → 2022

Verano de Escándalo (Spanish for "Summer of Scandal") was a major professional wrestling event produced by the Mexican Lucha Libre AAA Worldwide (AAA) promotion, which took place on July 3, 2021 at an unknown location in Tequisquiapan, Querétaro, Mexico. The Verano de Escándalo event has been a regular summer event for AAA since 1997, only skipping the event in 2012, 2013, 2016, and 2020. 2021 marked the 21st time AAA has used that name for an event and the first Verano de Escándalo event since 2019.

== Production ==
=== Background ===
In September 1997 Mexican professional wrestling, company Asistencia Asesoría y Administración, later known as simply AAA and then Lucha Libre AAA Worldwide, added a new major event to their schedule as they held the first ever Verano de Escándalo ("Summer of Scandal") show on September 14, 1997. The Verano de Escándalo show became an annual event from 1997 until 2011, usually held in September, with few exceptions. In 2012 AAA changed their major event schedule as they pushed Triplemanía XX to August instead of holding the show in June or July as had been the case up until 2012. With the change to the schedule AAA did not hold a Verano de Escándalo show in 2012 and 2013. In 2014 the show was put back on the schedule, but held in June instead, filling the void left when Triplemanía was moved. AAA did not hold a Verano de Escándalo in 2016, instead holding the Lucha Libre World Cup in June. A Verano de Escándalo show was not held in 2020 due to the COVID-19 pandemic. The 2021 Verano de Escándalo show will be the 21st show in the series.

=== Storylines ===
The 2021 Verano de Escándalo show featured five professional wrestling matches with different wrestlers involved in pre-existing, scripted feuds, plots, and storylines. Wrestlers portrayed either heels (referred to as rudos in Mexico, those that portray the "bad guys") or faces (técnicos in Mexico, the "good guy" characters) as they followed a series of tension-building events, which culminated in a wrestling match or series of matches.

== Results ==
No.	Results	Stipulations	Times
1	Arez and Chik Tormenta defeated Abismo Negro Jr. and Flammer and Mr. Iguana and Mamba	Three-way tag team match to determine the #1 contenders for the AAA World Mixed Tag Team Championship	—
2	Hijo del Vikingo defeated Kamikaze, Komander, Aramís, Látigo, and Toxin	Six-man Trofeo Alas de Oro match	—
3	Deonna Purrazzo defeated Lady Shani	Singles match	9:29
4	Poder del Norte (Tito Santana, Carta Brava Jr., and Mocho Cota Jr.) defeated Laredo Kid, Niño Hamburguesa, and Faby Apache	Trios match	—
5	Los Mercenarios (Rey Escorpion, Taurus, and Texano Jr.) (c) defeated Los Psycho Circus (Monster Clown, Murder Clown and Psycho Clown)	Trios match for the AAA World Trios Championship	—
(c) / – the champion(s) heading into the match

== See also ==
- 2021 in professional wrestling
