= Verano de Escándalo (2010) =

2010 Lucha Libre AAA World Wide event

- Promotion: AAA
- Date: August 14, 2010
- City: Orizaba, Veracruz, Mexico
- Venue: Plaza de Toros la Concordia

Pay-per-view chronology
← Previous; Triplemanía XVIII	Next → Héroes Inmortales IV

Verano de Escándalo chronology
← Previous; 2009	Next → 2011

Verano de Escándalo (2010) was a major professional wrestling event produced by AAA, which took place on August 14, 2010. It was originally scheduled to take place at Arena Monterrey in Monterrey, Nuevo León, Mexico but due to Nuevo León suffering damage from Hurricane Alex the show was moved to Plaza de Toros la Concordia in Orizaba, Veracruz. The show was the 14th show promoted under the Verano de Escándalo name. The title is Spanish for "Summer of Scandal" and has been AAA's annual summer show since 1997. It featured a double main event with the first match being a three way match for the AAA Mega Championship with reigning champion Dr. Wagner Jr. successfully defending against his brother Silver King and Vampiro. The other main event is a "AAA vs. Perros del Mal" six man tag team match pitting AAA representatives La Parka, Cibernético and El Mesias against Perros Perro Aguayo Jr., L.A. Park and Damián 666 which Los Perros del Mal won when Perro Aguayo Jr. pinned El Mesias. The show also saw the AAA Reina de Reinas Championship change hands as Mari Apache won the title from Sexy Star.

== Production ==
=== Background ===
First held during the summer of 1997 the Mexican professional wrestling, company AAA began holding a major wrestling show during the summer, most often in September, called Verano de Escándalo ("Summer of Scandal"). The Verano de Escándalo show was an annual event from 1997 until 2011, then AAA did not hold a show in 2012 and 2013 before bringing the show back in 2014, but this time in June, putting it at the time AAA previously held their Triplemanía show. In 2012 and 2013 Triplemanía XX and Triplemanía XXI was held in August instead of the early summer. The show often features championship matches or Lucha de Apuestas or bet matches where the competitors risked their wrestling mask or hair on the outcome of the match. In Lucha Libre the Lucha de Apuetas match is considered more prestigious than a championship match and a lot of the major shows feature one or more Apuesta matches. The 2010 Verano de Escándalo show was the 154th show in the series.

=== Storylines ===
The Verano de Escándalo show featured six professional wrestling matches with different wrestlers involved in pre-existing, scripted feuds, plots, and storylines. Wrestlers were portrayed as either heels (referred to as rudos in Mexico, those that portray the "bad guys") or faces (técnicos in Mexico, the "good guy" characters) as they followed a series of tension-building events, which culminated in a wrestling match or series of matches.

Other on-screen personnel
Role:	Name:
Referee	Pepe "Tropi" Casas
Referee	El Pierro
Referee	Copetes Salazar
Referee	Hijo del Tirantes

== Results ==
No.	Results	Stipulations
1	Cynthia Moreno, El Elegido, Octagoncito and Pimpinela Escarlata defeated Alan Stone, Jennifer Blake, Mini Abismo Negro and Yuriko	Relevos Atómicos de Locura match
2	Aero Star, Fabi Apache and Mari Apache defeated La Legión Extranjera (Alex Koslov, Christina Von Eerie (c) and Sexy Star (c))	Mixed six-person tag team match for the AAA Reina de Reinas Championship and the AAA World Mixed Tag Team Championship
3	Heavy Metal and Octagón defeated Los Maniacos (Electroshock and Último Gladiador)	Tag team match
4	Jack Evans and La Hermandad 187 (Joe Líder and Nicho el Millonario) defeated La Legión Extranjera (Hernandez, Nosawa and El Zorro)	Six-man tag team match
5	Dr. Wagner Jr. (c) defeated Silver King and Vampiro	Three-way match for the AAA Mega Championship
6	Los Perros del Mal (Damián 666, L.A. Park and Perro Aguayo Jr.) defeated Cibernético, El Mesías and La Parka	Six-man tag team match
(c) / – the champion(s) heading into the match
