= Verano de Escándalo (2008) =

2008 Lucha Libre AAA World Wide event

Verano de Escándalo 2008
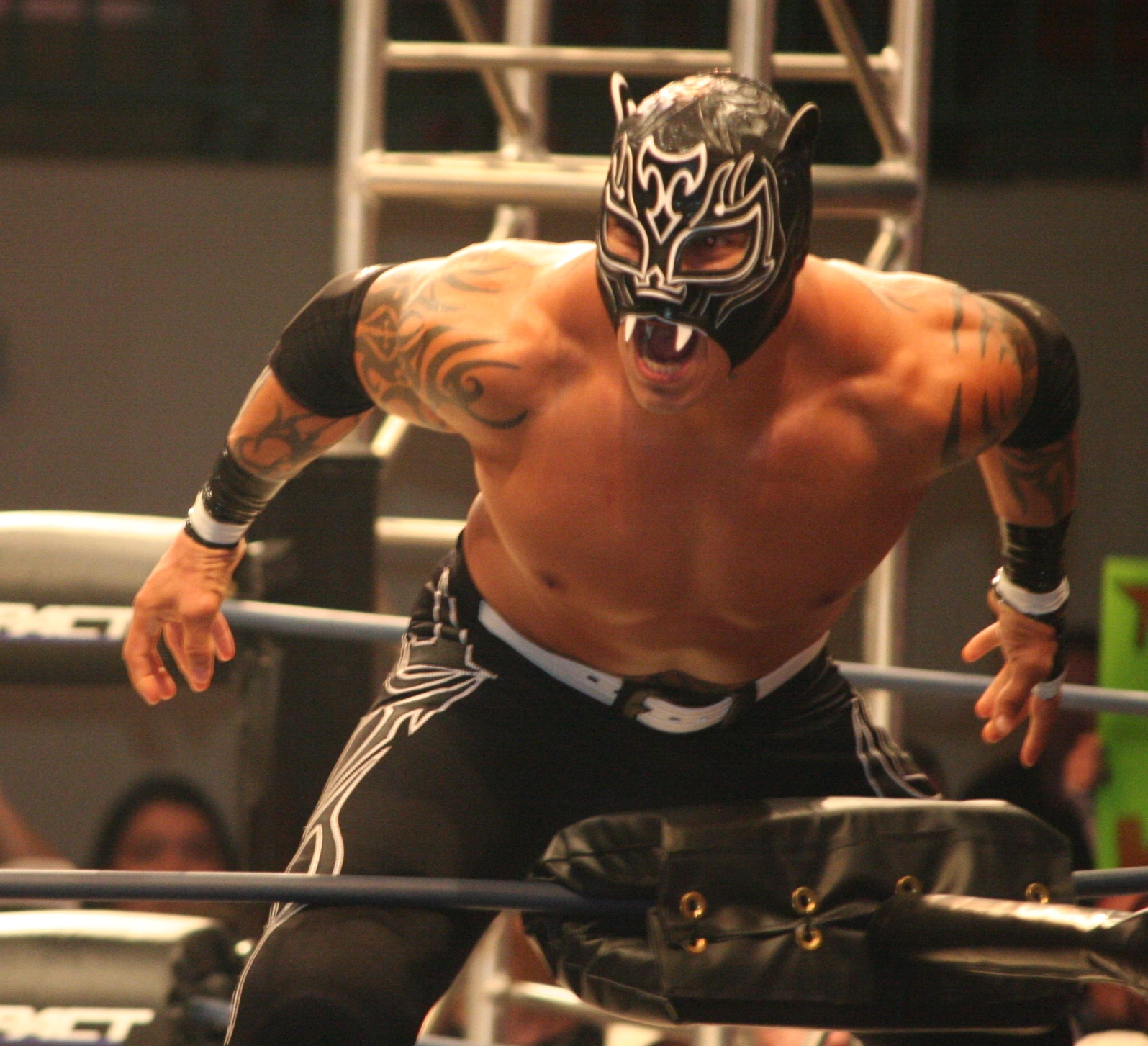
- Extreme Tiger, who (along with Halloween) lost the AAA World Tag Team Championship at Verano de Escándalo
- Promotion: AAA
- Date: September 14, 2008
- City: Zapopan, Mexico
- Venue: Auditorio Benito Juarez
- Attendance: 11,500

Pay-per-view chronology
← Previous; Triplemanía XVI	Next → Antonio Peña Memorial Show

Verano de Escándalo chronology
← Previous; 2007	Next → 2009

Verano de Escándalo (2008) (Spanish for "Summer of Scandal") was the twelfth annual Verano de Escándalo professional wrestling show promoted by AAA. The show took place on September 14, 2008, in Zapopan, Mexico. The Main event featured a Steel Cage "Street Fight" Match between Vampiro and El Mesías.

== Production ==
=== Background ===
First held during the summer of 1997 the Mexican professional wrestling, company v began holding a major wrestling show during the summer, most often in September, called Verano de Escándalo ("Summer of Scandal"). The Verano de Escándalo show was an annual event from 1997 until 2011, then AAA did not hold a show in 2012 and 2013 before bringing the show back in 2014, but this time in June, putting it at the time AAA previously held their Triplemanía show. In 2012 and 2013 Triplemanía XX and Triplemanía XXI was held in August instead of the early summer. The show often features championship matches or Lucha de Apuestas or bet matches where the competitors risked their wrestling mask or hair on the outcome of the match. In Lucha Libre the Lucha de Apuetas match is considered more prestigious than a championship match and a lot of the major shows feature one or more Apuesta matches. The 2008 Verano de Escándalo show was the 12th show in the series.

=== Storylines ===
The Verano de Escándalo show featured seven professional wrestling matches with different wrestlers involved in pre-existing, scripted feuds, plots, and storylines. Wrestlers were portrayed as either heels (referred to as rudos in Mexico, those that portray the "bad guys") or faces (técnicos in Mexico, the "good guy" characters) as they followed a series of tension-building events, which culminated in a wrestling match or series of matches.

== Results ==
No.	Results	Stipulations
1	El Oriental and Cinthia Moreno defeated Gran Apache and Mari Apache (c)	Mixed tag team match for the AAA World Mixed Tag Team Championship
2	El Alebrije, Brazo de Plata, El Elegido, and Pimpinela Escarlata defeated El Brazo, Decnis, Escorpión Negro, and Pirata Morgan.	Eight-man "Atómicos" tag team match
3	Mini Charly Manson defeated Octagóncito and Mini Abismo Negro	Three-way elimination tournament final match for the inaugural AAA World Mini-Estrella Championship
4	Gronda, La Parka, and Super Fly defeated La Legión Extranjera (Electroshock, Kenzo Suzuki, and El Zorro)	Six-man "Lucha Libre rules" tag team match
5	La Hermandad 187 (Joe Líder and Nicho el Millonario) defeated the Mexican Powers (Crazy Boy and Último Gladiador), La Familia de Tijuana (Extreme Tiger and Halloween) (c), and The Hart Foundation 2.0 (Jack Evans and Teddy Hart)	Four-way ladder match for the AAA World Tag Team Championship
6	Cibernético (c) defeated Chessman.	Singles match for the AAA Mega Championship
7	Vampiro defeated El Mesías	Steel cage "street fight" match
(c) / – the champion(s) heading into the match

=== Inaugural AAA World Mini-Estrella Championship Tournament bracket ===
1st Round
Sin Limite (July 25, 2008)
Atomic Boy	Win
Mascarita de la Muerte	2:48
Sin Limite (July 20, 2008)
La Parkita	3:13
Mini Abismo Negro	Win
Sin Limite (July 20, 2008)
Mascarita Sagrada	Win
Mini Histeria	2:43
Sin Limite (July 31, 2008)
Jerrito Estrada	3:00
Mini Charly Manson	Win
Sin Limite (August 8, 2008)
Mascarita Divina	2:40
Mini Kenzo Suzuki	Win
Sin Limite (July 25, 2008)
Mini Chessman	3:40
Octagóncito	Win

Semifinals
Sin Limite (August 31, 2008)
Atomic Boy	—
Mini Abismo Negro	Win
Sin Limite (August 17, 2008)
Mascarita Sagrada	4:52
Mini Charly Manson	Win
Sin Limite (August 15, 2008)
Mini Kenzo Suzuki	4:08
Octagóncito	Win

Final
Sin Limite: Verano de Escándalo (September 14, 2008)
Mini Abismo Negro	13:06
Mini Charly Manson	Win (Note: This was a three-way elimination match. Order of elimination: Octagóncito, Mini Abismo Negro)
Octagóncito	—
