= Xóchitl Hamada =

Mexican professional wrestler (born 1970)

Personal information
- Born: Xóchitl Guadalupe Hamada Villarreal; May 1, 1970 (age 56) Nuevo Laredo, Tamaulipas, Mexico
- Spouses: Pentagón Black (husband); Silver King (ex-husband)
- Parent: Gran Hamada (father)
- Relative: Ayako Hamada (sister)

Professional wrestling career
- Ring name: Xóchitl Hamada
- Billed height: 1.65 m (5 ft 5 in)
- Billed weight: 80 kg (176 lb)
- Trained by: Blue Panther; Gran Hamada; Shadito Cruz; Shinobu Kandori; Jackie Sato
- Debut: September 5, 1986

Xóchitl Guadalupe Hamada Villarreal (ソーチル・グアダルーペ・ハマダ・ビジャレアル, Sōchiru Guadarūpe Hamada Bijarearu; ring name: ソチ浜田, Sochi Hamada; born May 1, 1970) is a Japanese Mexican semi-retired professional wrestler. She is the daughter of Japanese professional wrestler Gran Hamada, the sister of wrestler Ayako Hamada and the sister-in-law of Tiger Mask IV. Hamada was once married to Mexican wrestler Silver King and is currently married to Mexican wrestler Pentagon Black. Hamada has worked for most of her professional wrestling career in Mexico, making occasional appearances in her father's home country of Japan. Xóchitl Hamada has worked for Mexico's two largest wrestling companies, Consejo Mundial de Lucha Libre (CMLL) and Asistencia Asesoría y Administración (AAA). She has held the CMLL World Women's Championship and was the first AAA Reina de Reinas (Spanish for "Queen of Queens").

== Professional wrestling career ==
Xóchitl Hamada made her professional wrestling debut in 1986, counting both her father, Gran Hamada, Blue Panther and the patriarch of the Nieves wrestling family Shadito Cruz among her trainers. After working in both Japan and her native Mexico, Hamada began working for Consejo Mundial de Lucha Libre (CMLL) in the early 1990s as the company began building a women's division. On March 21, 1993, Hamada defeated Bull Nakano to become the second ever CMLL World Women's Champion. Hamada's title reign lasted for almost seven months before she was defeated by the Ruda (villain) La Diabólica on October 10, 1993. While Hamada received numerous rematches she never managed to reclaim the championship. In the mid-1990s CMLL's interest in the women's division waned, leaving Hamada and others with very little regular work.

In 1997 Xóchitl Hamada decided to leave CMLL and began working for its rival promotion Asistencia Asesoría y Administración (AAA) which had a more active women's division. At AAA's 1997 Verano de Escandalo event Hamada teamed with La Pracicante, losing a Relevos Suicidas tag team match to Martha Villalobos and Sexi Boom. As per the Suicidas rules the Hamada and La Practicante had to wrestle in a Lucha de Apuestas, bet match, with their hair on the line. Hamada defeated La Practicante and shaved off her competitor's hair after the match. Three months later, Hamada teamed up with Lady Discovery, Lady Luxor and Lady Venum (A female version of the Los Cadetos del Espacio group) to defeat La Fugitiva, La Migala, La Practicante and Martha Villalobos on the undercard of the 1997 Guerra de Titanes show. A year after wrestling in a Relevos Suicida match at the 1997 Verano de Escandalo, she participated in another one at that year's Verano de Escandalo show. Once again Hamada and her partner, this time Rossy Moreno, lost the match as they were defeated by Alda Moreno and Miss Janeth. The Apuesta match left Rossy Moreno bald as Xóchitl Hamada was once again successful. The match at Verano de Escandalo was a result of a long-running storyline feud between Hamada and the Moreno family (Rossy, Alda and Esther Moreno). On February 19, 1999, Hamada defeated Janeth, Rossy Moreno and Esther Moreno in the four-way final to win AAA's first ever Reina de Reinas tournament. The Hamada/Moreno feud continued further in 1999 when the Moreno family defeated La Migala, Miss Janeth and Hamada at that year's Rey de Reyes show.

At Triplemanía VII Hamada competed in an inter-gender match against Pentagón, her real life husband, a match she lost by disqualification when she ripped Pentagón's mask off during the match. The Hamada / Moreno family feud kept running into the new millennia where Hamada and Pentagón went to a double count out against Esther Moreno and El Oriental (Also a Moreno) at Triplemanía VIII in Tokyo, Japan. Her long-running feud with the Moreno family extended beyond Hamada leaving AAA in the mid-2000s as she continued to wrestle against various Moreno siblings on the independent circuit. When Cinthia Moreno and El Oriental left AAA in 2009 Hamada resumed wrestling the sibling team in mixed tag team matches, teaming with Pentagón Black.

== Personal life ==
Hamada is the daughter of professional wrestler Gran Hamada as well as the sister of wrestler Ayako Hamada and has at least one other sister. She is the ex-sister-in-law of Tiger Mask IV who was married to a sister who is not a professional wrestler. For many years Hamada was married to César Cuauhtémoc González, who wrestled as "Silver King" and together they have a son who aspires to wrestle as "Silver King, Jr." one day. She is currently married to professional wrestler José Mercado López, who wrestled as "Pentagon Black".

== Championships and accomplishments ==
- Asistencia Asesoría y Administración
  - AAA Reina de Reinas Championship (1 time)
- Consejo Mundial de Lucha Libre
  - CMLL World Women's Championship (1 time)

=== Lucha de Apuesta record ===
Winner (wager)	Loser (wager)	Location	Event	Date	Notes
Xóchitl Hamada (hair)	Oyuki (mask)	Guatemala	Live event	N/A	
Xóchitl Hamada (hair)	La Alondra (mask)	Celaya, Guanajuato	Live event	N/A	
Xóchitl Hamada (hair)	La Infernal (mask)	N/A	Live event	N/A	
Xóchitl Hamada (hair)	La Practicante (hair)	Tonalá, Jalisco	Verano de Escandalo	September 14, 1997	(Note: Relevos suicidas match: lost to Sexy Boom and Martha Villalobos and had to wrestle each other.)
Xóchitl Hamada (hair)	Rossy Moreno (hair)	Ciudad Madero, Tamaulipas	Verano de Escandalo	September 18, 1998	(Note: Relevos suicidas match: lost to Alda Moreno and Miss Janeth and were forced to wrestle each other.)
Pentagon Black and Xóchitl Hamada (hair)	Rossy Moreno (hair)	Live event	Naucalpan, Mexico State	March 5, 2000	(Note: Match was between Pentagon Black (seconded by Hamada) and El Oriental (seconded by Rossy Moreno) with hair of the second on the line.)
Ayako Hamada (hair)	Xóchitl Hamada (hair)	Tokyo, Japan	Live event	December 24, 2000	
