= Espíritu (wrestler) =

Mexican wrestler (born 1975)

Personal information
- Born: December 9, 1975 (age 50) León, Guanajuato, Mexico

Professional wrestling career
- Ring name(s): Dark Espíritu; Espíritu
- Trained by: Bobby Lee; Hercules Leon
- Debut: May 10, 1993

Espíritu / Dark Espíritu (Spanish for "Spirit") (born December 9, 1975) is a Mexican professional wrestler, who's most well known for working as a heel character in Lucha Libre AAA Worldwide (AAA). Espíritu was original a member of the stable Los Vatos Locos, replacing Charly Manson when he left to form The Black Family in mid-2001. In November 2005 the Black Family asked Espíritu to join their group as they became part of La Secta Cibernética. Espíritu switched to the Black Family but parted amicably with the other Vatos Locos and at times teams with his old teammates Picudo, Nygma and Silver Cat. When La Secta became La Secta del Mesías Espíritu adopted the darker more "gothic" look that came with the shift in name.

The unmasked AAA wrestler Espíritu should not be confused with the masked wrestler who works for Paragon Pro Wrestling.

== Professional wrestling career ==
Espíritu made his debut on May 10, 1993 after learning the trade from Bobby Lee and Herculés León. Espíritu worked for years on the Mexican independent circuit until he began working for Lucha Libre AAA Worldwide (AAA) in the mid to late 90s.

=== Lucha Libre AAA Worldwide (2000-present) ===
==== Los Vatos Locos ====
In 2000 Espíritu was picked to replace Charly Manson in the new stable called Los Vatos Locos (Spanish for "the Crazy Guys") as Manson was slowly being phased out of the group to form the Black Family in 2001. Espíritu joined Picudo, Nygma and May Flowers. Espíritu's first "Major" appearance with Los Vatos was at Triplemanía VIII on July 5, 2000. Los Vatos (in this case Espíritu, Picudo and Charly Manson participated in a Four corners elimination match that also included Perro Aguayo, Jr., El Alebrije, and Pathfinder, Team Japan (Naomichi Marufuji, Minoru Tanaka and Genki Horiguchi) and Los Vipers (Histeria, Psicosis II and Maniaco). Los Vatos was the first team eliminated. Espíritu's next major event showing was successful as he along with the rest of Los Vatos Locos defeated Los Spice Boys at Guerrera de Titanes 2000. in 2001 May Flowers left Los Vatos Locos to join a new group called "Los Exoticos" and was replaced by "Silver Cat". When Silver Cat joined the group there were now four men all with face paint, which led to the group adopting a Kiss look, both in face paint and in their outfits. Espirtu's facepaint resembled Ace Frehley's "Spaceman" face paint. Los Vatos had won the Mexican National Atómicos Championship twice before Espíritu joined the group and they were chasing a third reign, feuding with the then champions Los Vipers. Their first major challenge was unsuccessful as Los Vipers won their Triplemanía IX encounter. But when the two teams clashed at Guerrera de Titanes 2001 on November 23, 2001 the team finally defeated Los Vipers (Psicosis II, Maniaco, Histeria, and El Mosco de la Merced) to win the Atómicos title.

Los Vatos Locos and Los Vipers continued to feud throughout 2002, capping their feud off with an eight-man elimination match for the Atómicos titles at Verano de Escandalo (2002), Los Vatos Locos successful retained their titles at the event. On December 2, 2002 Los Vatos Locos lost the Atómicos title to the team of Oscar Sevilla and Los Barrio Boys (Alan, Billy Boy and Decnis) and were unsuccessful in subsequent challenges.

==== The Black Family ====
In 2005 after the Black Family lost the Mexican National Atómicos Championship, Chessman left the group, leaving the group a member short. The Black Family Espíritu to leave Los Vatos Locos and join them to fill the void. The invitation was accepted without any friction from the rest of Los Vatos Locos whom Espíritu remains on friendly terms with. Sometime in 2006 all four members of the Black Family changed their names slightly adding the word "Dark" in front of their names, thus Espíritu became 'Dark Espirut although the names are use interchangeably. On September 7, 2007 Espíritu along with the rest of the Black Family faced Los Hell Brothers and El Zorro in a Domo De La Muerte cage match where the last man in the ring would have his hair shaved off under Luchas de Apuestas rules. Espíritu was the last man in the ring and was shaved bald after the match. Subsequently, Espíritu has kept his head shaved and expanded his face paint to cover his entire head.

In early 2008 El Mesías and the rest of La Secta was kicked out of La Legión Extranjera with La Legión putting El Mesías out of commission for a while. When El Mesías returned to active competition tension began to build between the Black Family and El Mesías. The tensions culminated after El Mesías lost a Steel Cage "Street Fight" Match to Vampiro at Verano de Escandalo (2008) which led to the Black Family attacking El Mesías officially severing their relationship. After breaking up La Secta del Mesías the group began to feud with El Mesías. During the fall and winter of 2008 both Charly Manson and Chessman made hints at them possibly returning to the Black Family but Manson got injured and taken off TV while Chessman turned on the group after feinting friendship. On January 9, 2009 Chessman teamed with the Psycho Circus (Killer Clown, Psycho Clown and Zombie Clown) to end the Black Family's Atómicos title run.

==== El Inframundo / La Secta Bizarra Cibernetica ====
In May 2011, Espíritu, Ozz and Cuervo joined La Parka and Drago to form technico group El Inframundo ("The Underworld") and battle Cibernético's Los Bizarros, which also included their former stable mate Escoria. On October 9 at Héroes Inmortales, La Parka turned rudo and jumped to Los Perros del Mal, effectively dissolving El Inframundo.

On August 18, 2012, the former members of La Secta came together with former leader Cibernético's stable Los Bizarros to form La Secta Bizarra Cibernetica. On August 2, 2013, the entire La Secta turned on Cibernético, forming a new rudo version of the stable.

=== Lucha Libre Elite ===
On November 4, 2016, Espíritu, along with Ozz, made his debut for Lucha Libre Elite with the two aligning themselves with Cibernético.

== Championships and accomplishments ==
- Lucha Libre AAA Worldwide
  - Mexican National Atómicos Championship (2 times) – with Picudo, Nygma and Sliver Cat (1), Dark Cuervo, Dark Ozz and Dark Escoria (1)

== Luchas de Apuestas record ==
Winner (wager)	Loser (wager)	Location	Event	Date	Notes
Espíritu (hair)	Kalungo (hair)	Leon, Guanajuato	Live event	N/A	
Cibernético (hair)	Espíritu (hair)	Guadalajara, Jalisco	Verano de Escándalo	September 7, 2007	(Note: Steel cage match that also included Dark Escoria, Dark Ozz, Dark Cuervo, Chessman, Charly Manson, and El Zorro)
Hombre sin Miedo (mask)	Espíritu (hair)	Nuevo Laredo, Tamaulipas	Live event	April 18, 2011	(Note: Steel cage match, where Espíritu, Dark Ozz and Dark Cuervo faced Hombre sin Miedo, Sobredosis and Río Bravo.)
