= The Black Family =

Professional wrestling stable

Statistics
- Members: Scoria; Cuervo
- Name(s): The Black Family; The Dark Family
- Former members: Charley Manson; Chessman; Dark Ozz
- Debut: 2000

The Black Family is a professional wrestling face / tecnico stable that has been working in AAA since 2000. Originally a heel / rudo stable, The Black Family currently consists of original member Dark Cuervo as well as the later additions of Dark Ozz, and Dark Espíritu. The group is also referred to as the Dark Family, mainly became all members added the word "Dark " to their names in 2007, the two names are used interchangeably. The Black Family is often part of a much larger stables such as Lucha Libre Latina (LLL) or La Secta De Mesias but act as a unit within the larger stable. Members of the group has held the AAA World Tag Team Championship once and the Mexican National Atómicos Championship three times in two different combinations. In October 2010 the stable turned tecnico for the first time. In 2015 Dark Ozz and Espiritu left AAA and Cuervo and Scoria reformed the Black Family.

== History ==
The Black Family was created in 2000 when Charly Manson, Chessman Escoria and Cuervo were teamed up to form a rudo (Heel or "bad guy") group that shared a Goth-inspired look, reflected in their ring clothes and painted faces. In 2001 the masked wrestler Path Finder was repackaged as Ozz and joined the Black Family following a career threatening injury to Charly Manson that forced him out of the ring for several months. In late 2001 Charly Manson returned while still not fully recovered, and began a war of words with the Black Family as Chessman had taken over his leadership role in Manson's absence. The storyline did not develop further as Manson left AAA altogether. When Chessman took over leadership of the group the Black Family joined Lucha Libre Latina (LLL), the Mexican version of the New World Order, a group led by Chessman's long time friend Cibernético. Even though they were part of a much larger group the four men still worked as a unit, a stable within the stable.

The Black Family made their first major show appearance at the 2001 Verano de Escandalo where they lost an elimination match to Los Vatos Locos (Espíritu, Nygma, Silver Cat & Picudo), also in the match were Los Vipers (Psicosis II, Histeria, Maniaco & Mosco de la Merced) and Los Exoticos. the team did not make another major show appearance until a year later when they unsuccessfully challenged Los Vatos Locos for the Mexican National Atómicos Championship at Verano de Escandalo (2002). that challenge was the first of many as the Black Family began chasing the Atómicos title and feuding with Los Vatos Locos. when Los Vatos Locos lost the titles to someone else in late 2002 the Black Family started to target the new champions Oscar Sevilla and Los Barrio Boys (Alan, Billy Boy and Decnis). When Charly Manson returned to action he sided with Los Vipers instead of the Black Family leading to a match at Guerra de Titanes 2002 where the Black Family defeated Manson, Histeria, Mosco de la Merced and Psicosis II. On July 18, 2003 the Black Family won their first championship as a unit when they defeated Oscar Sevilla and Los Barrio Boys for the Atómicos title, but their run only lasted 31 days before Sevilla and Los Barrio Boys regained the titles. It would be just over a year before the Black Family got another opportunity to hold the titles as they won them on August 20, 2004.

=== La Secta ===
In 2005 Cibernético formed a new group called La Secta Cibernetica that included his friends Charly Manson and Chessman and through Chessman's membership the Black Family was also invited to join this new supergroup. The group assisted Cibernético in his fight with La Parka (the AAA version), being unable to prevent him from being unmasked at Triplemanía XII. Later in the year Muerta Cibernetica was brought in to get revenge on La Parka. When Cibernético suffered a severe knee injury Muerta Cibernetica took over the group and kicked Cibernético out. Muerta Cibernetica was himself unmasked by La Parka 2 years after Cibernético was unmasked. After holding the Atómicos titles for 789 days the Black Family lost to the Mexican Powers (Crazy Boy, Juventud Guerrera, Joe Lider and Psicosis II) on October 18, 2006. Not long after they lost the tag team titles Chessman turned "Technicó" and sided with Cibernético and Charly Manson to form "Los Hell Brothers" fighting against La Secta, now known as "La Secta del Mesias" as Muerta Cibernetica changed his name to "EL Mesias". With Chessman out of the Black Family the team invited Espíritu to leave Los Vatos Locos and join them, the invitation was accepted without any friction from the rest of Los Vatos Locos. During 2006 La Secta del Mesias became part of the super group of "Rudós" known as La Legión Extranjera making the Black Family a sub-group of a sub-group. Sometime in 2006 all four members of the Black Family changed their names slightly adding the word "Dark" in front of their names, thus Ozz became 'Dark Ozz although the names are use interchangeably. In early 2007 Ozz teamed with Cuervo to compete in a 16 team tournament to crown the first ever AAA World Tag Team Champions. in the end four teams met in the finals at the Rey de Reyes (2007) event. Dark Ozz and Dark Cuervo defeated The Mexican Powers (Crazy Boy and Joe Lider), Los Guapos (Alan Stone and Zumbido) and Real Fuerza Aérea AAA (Pegasso and Super Fly) in an elimination match to win the titles. Ozz became a double champion when the Black Family won the Atómicos titles from the Mexican Powers on May 20, 2007. The dual title situation only lasted until Triplemanía XV where the Mexican Powers team of Crazy Boy and Joe Lider won the Tag Team Championship.

=== End of La Secta ===
In early 2008 El Mesias and the rest of La Secta were kicked out of La Legión Extranjera with La Legión putting El Mesias out of commission for a while. When El Mesias returned to active competition, tension began to build between the Black Family and El Mesias. The tensions culminated after El Mesias lost a Steel Cage "Street Fight" Match to Vampiro at Verano de Escandalo (2008) which led to the Black Family attacking El Mesias, officially severing their relationship. After breaking up La Secta del Mesias, Dark Ozz assumed leadership of the group as they began to feud with El Mesias. During the fall and winter of 2008 both Charly Manson and Chessman made hints at them possibly returning to the Black Family but Manson got injured and taken off TV while Chessman turned on the group after feinting friendship. On January 9, 2009, Chessman teamed with the Psycho Circus (Killer Clown, Psycho Clown and Zombie Clown) to end the Black Family's Atómicos title run. Since the loss of the Atómicos title the Black Family has been without a general purpose, working mid-card matches and filling in when needed without a specific storyline in the works.

=== El Inframundo ===
On October 1, 2010, at Héroes Inmortales IV, The Black Family turned technico for the first time, when Ozz and Cuervo represented AAA in its battle against La Sociedad. On October 20, 2010, Escoria officially left The Black Family to join Cibernético and Taboo in the new Los Bizarros stable. In May 2011, the rest of The Black Family joined La Parka and Drago to form El Inframundo ("The Underworld") and battle Los Bizarros.

=== Dark Family ===
On March 31, 2017, Cuervo and Scoria won the AAA World Tag Team Championship, which they held until May 26. They regained the titles on December 16, 2017.

== Championships and accomplishments ==
- AAA
  - AAA World Tag Team Championship (4 times) – Cuervo and Ozz (1), and Cuervo and Scoria (3)
  - Mexican National Atómicos Championship (3 times) – Ozz, Escoria, Cuervo and Chessman (2), Ozz, Escoria, Cuervo and Espíritu (1)
- All Japan Pro Wrestling
  - World Tag Team Championship (1 time) – Cuervo and Ozz
- Kaoz Lucha Libre
  - Kaoz Tag Team Championship (1 time, current) – (Cuervo and Escoria)
