= Triplemanía XX =

2012 Lucha Libre AAA World Wide event

- Promotional poster featuring El Hijo del Perro Aguayo, El Mesías, Máscara Año 2000 Jr. and Dr. Wagner Jr.
- Promotion: AAA
- Date: August 5, 2012
- City: Mexico City, Mexico
- Venue: Arena Ciudad de México
- Attendance: 21,000
- Tagline(s): El Día Ha Llegado ("The Day Has Come")

Event chronology
← Previous; Rey de Reyes	Next → Héroes Inmortales

Triplemanía chronology
← Previous; XIX	Next → XXI

Triplemanía XX was a professional wrestling event scripted and produced by the AAA promotion, which took place on August 5, 2012, at Arena Ciudad de México in Mexico City, Mexico. The event was the twentieth annual Triplemanía, which is AAA's biggest show of the year, and marked AAA's debut in the new Arena Ciudad de México. The event was headlined by a match between Dr. Wagner Jr. and Máscara Año 2000 Jr., where the loser was forced to unmask himself. In the semi-main event, El Mesías defended the AAA Mega Championship against the 2012 Rey de Reyes, El Hijo del Perro Aguayo. The event also featured Total Nonstop Action Wrestling (TNA) performer Kurt Angle's AAA debut and an induction into the AAA Hall of Fame. This event marked the first time in four years that a Triplemanía was not broadcast live on pay-per-view. Instead, the event would be broadcast in three parts on AAA's official website, starting August 19. The event was attended by 21,000 people, the largest crowd for a professional wrestling event in Mexico in almost five years.

== Production ==
=== Background ===
In early 1992 Antonio Peña was working as a booker and storyline writer for Consejo Mundial de Lucha Libre (CMLL), Mexico's largest and the world's oldest wrestling promotion, and was frustrated by CMLL's very conservative approach to professional wrestling, specifically the style of wrestling known as Lucha Libre (Spanish for "freestyle wrestling"). He joined forced with a number of younger, very talented wrestlers who felt like CMLL was not giving them the recognition they deserved and decided to split from CMLL to create Asistencia Asesoría y Administración, later known simply as "AAA" or Triple A. After making a deal with the Televisa television network AAA held their first show in April 1992. The following year Peña and AAA held their first Triplemanía event, building it into an annual event that would become AAA's Super Bowl event, similar to the WWE's WrestleMania being the biggest show of the year. The 2012 Triplemanía was the 20th year in a row AAA held a Triplemanía show and the 25th overall show under the Triplemanía banner.

=== Storylines ===
The Triplemanía XX show featured seven professional wrestling matches with different wrestlers involved in pre-existing scripted feuds, plots and storylines. Wrestlers were portrayed as either heels (referred to as rudos in Mexico, those that portray the "bad guys") or faces (técnicos in Mexico, the "good guy" characters) as they followed a series of tension-building events, which culminated in a wrestling match or series of matches.

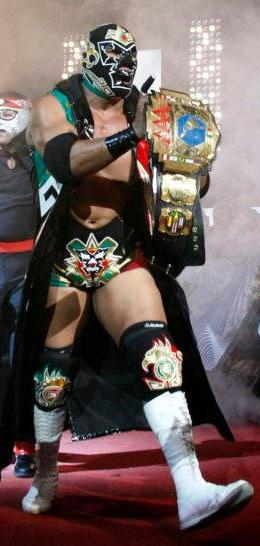
Dr. Wagner Jr., who wrestled his third Mask vs. Mask match at Triplemanía XX

At AAA's previous major event, Rey de Reyes on March 18, 2012, rudo stable El Consejo picked up their first win in AAA, when Máscara Año 2000 Jr., El Texano Jr. and Toscano defeated Dr. Wagner Jr., Electroshock and Heavy Metal in a six-man tag team match, with Máscara Año 2000 Jr. pinning Wagner Jr. for the win, following interference from El Consejo's masked accomplice El Hombre de Negro ("The Man in black"). In the weeks that followed Rey de Reyes, Máscara Año 2000 Jr. kept making challenges towards Wagner Jr. for a singles match, while El Consejo as a whole also feuded with Chessman, Silver King and Último Gladiador of rudo stable La Sociedad. This would, on April 30, drive longtime rivals and real-life brothers, Wagner Jr. and Silver King to make peace with each other and team up against Máscara Año 2000 Jr. and El Texano Jr. After losing as a result of another interference from El Hombre de Negro, the brothers shook hands to signal the end of hostilities between the two. On June 1, Máscara Año 2000 Jr. pinned Wagner Jr. in a rematch from April 30 and afterwards challenged him to a Mask vs. Mask Lucha de Apuestas, which Wagner Jr. accepted and named Triplemanía XX as the place, where he wanted the match to take place. A third match between Máscara Año 2000 Jr. and El Texano and the Wagner brothers took place on June 16 and ended with El Consejo picking another win with help from El Hombre de Negro, who during a post-match beatdown unmasked and revealed himself as Máscara Año 2000, the legitimate father of Máscara Año 2000 Jr., who on April 30, 1993, had lost his mask to Perro Aguayo in the semi-main event of the first Triplemanía. In an interview on AAA's NotiAAA program, Máscara Año 2000 Jr. accepted the Mask vs. Mask match for Triplemanía XX and vowed to prove his family's superiority over the Wagner family by placing Wagner Jr.'s mask in his family's display cabinet. On June 30, Máscara Año 2000 Jr. defeated Wagner Jr. in a singles match with help from his father, after which the Mask vs. Mask match was made official for Triplemanía XX. On July 27 at the final AAA television taping before Triplemanía XX, the promotion recreated a famous segment from 1993, when Máscara Año 2000 hit Perro Aguayo with a glass bottle prior to their Triplemanía match, by having Máscara Año 2000 Jr. hit Dr. Wagner Jr. with a glass bottle to a win a No Disqualification match between the two, leaving his adversary bloodied in the ring heading into their Mask vs. Mask match.

After defeating his rival Jack Evans at Rey de Reyes to win the 2012 Rey de Reyes tournament and earn the right to challenge for the AAA Mega Championship, El Hijo del Perro Aguayo recruited Teddy Hart into his Los Perros del Mal stable to take care of Evans so he could concentrate on chasing El Mesías for the title. On April 1, Aguayo, along with his stable, attacked El Mesías with a steel chair. The attack was in storyline used to explain El Mesías' three-month absence from the ring due to a legitimate arm surgery. While El Mesías was recovering from his surgery, Aguayo kept busy by feuding with his close friend Cibernético. El Mesías made his return appearance on June 30, accepting the match against Aguyao at Triplemanía XX and promising that he would be ready come August 5. At the July 13 television tapings, El Mesías was set to speak about his status, but was interrupted by Los Perros del Mal. After surprising the rudo stable by removing his arm splint, El Mesías first disposed of Daga, Héctor Garza and Teddy Hart and then beat down El Hijo del Perro Aguayo, showing that he was ready for their upcoming title match. Afterwards, it was announced that Cibernético and Héctor Garza would accompany the champion and the challenger, respectively, to the title match, with Aguayo also announcing that he had a surprise waiting for AAA, hinting at the possible AAA debut of the tag team Los Traumas.

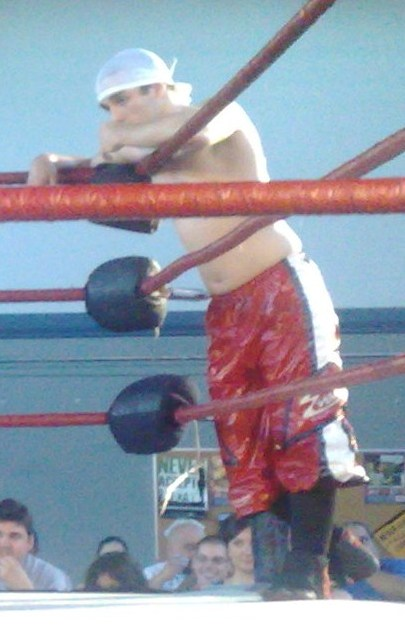
Jack Evans

One of the featured matches of Triplemanía XX saw three former tag teams, and current rivals, reunite and face each other in a Parejas Suicidas match. The first team is the former La Familia de Tijuana of Extreme Tiger and Halloween. Together, Tiger and Halloween held the AAA World Tag Team Championship from April to September 2008, after which the team disbanded, when Halloween left AAA to join Perros del Mal Producciones. Halloween returned to AAA on June 6, 2010, at Triplemanía XVIII as a member of Los Perros del Mal and has ever since remained on the opposite side of Extreme Tiger, who turned técnico during Halloween's time away from the promotion. The rivalry between Halloween and Tiger ignited in early 2012, when the two ended up on opposite sides during the rivalry between Tiger's tag team partner Jack Evans and Los Perros del Mal's leader El Hijo del Perro Aguayo. The second team in the match is the former The Hart Foundation 2.0 of Jack Evans and Teddy Hart, who joined AAA together in early 2008 as representatives of the rudo stable La Legión Extranjera (Foreign Legion). In May 2009, the team disbanded with Evans turning técnico, after which the two started feuding over the AAA Cruiserweight Championship. The feud ended without a proper conclusion in early 2010, when AAA suspended Hart indefinitely. Hart finally returned to AAA on March 18, 2012, at Rey de Reyes, and was on April 1 revealed as the newest member of Los Perros del Mal, taking over El Hijo del Perro Aguayo's feud with Evans as Aguayo moved on to chasing the AAA Mega Championship. The final team in the match is the former La Hermandad 187 of Joe Líder and Psicosis. After winning the AAA World Tag Team Championship from La Familia de Tijuana in September 2008, Líder and Psicosis, then known as Nicho el Millonario, held the title for 18 months, becoming the longest reigning champions in AAA history. Even after losing the title, Líder and Nicho remained together as a técnico team, feuding with the La Sociedad stable. In June 2011, AAA, in storyline, suspended Nicho, after he interfered in a six-man tag team match at Triplemanía XIX, where Líder, Heavy Metal and Electroshock, replacing the previously injured Nicho, faced Chessman, Silver King and Último Gladiador. On July 16, Nicho turned on Líder, believing that Líder had not stood up for him as he was, in his mind, being wronged by AAA. With Nicho joining Los Perros del Mal, he and Líder have had a bloody rivalry ever since. On April 6, 2012, the rivalry took another twist, when Líder burned Nicho's face with a fireball. Following the burning, Nicho began once again wearing his old mask and working under the ring name Psicosis, with the storyline being that Líder's fireball had not only severely burned Nicho's face, but the incident had also driven him insane. On July 11, it was announced that the Parejas Suicidas match would be taking place inside a steel cage. At the following day's Triplemanía XX press conference, the team of Chessman and AAA Cruiserweight Champion Juventud Guerrera was added to the match. Unlike the other teams in the match, Chessman and Guerrera have no prolonged history with each other, though they are on opposite sides in the battle between La Sociedad and AAA. In the months before Triplemanía XX, Chessman had been feuding with Vampiro, while Guerrera was busy with his former protégé Daga, who had turned on him and joined Los Perros del Mal. The losing team in the match would then face each other in a Lucha de Apuestas. If La Familia de Tijuana lost, the match would be a Mask vs. Hair match, in other cases it would be a Hair vs. Hair match.

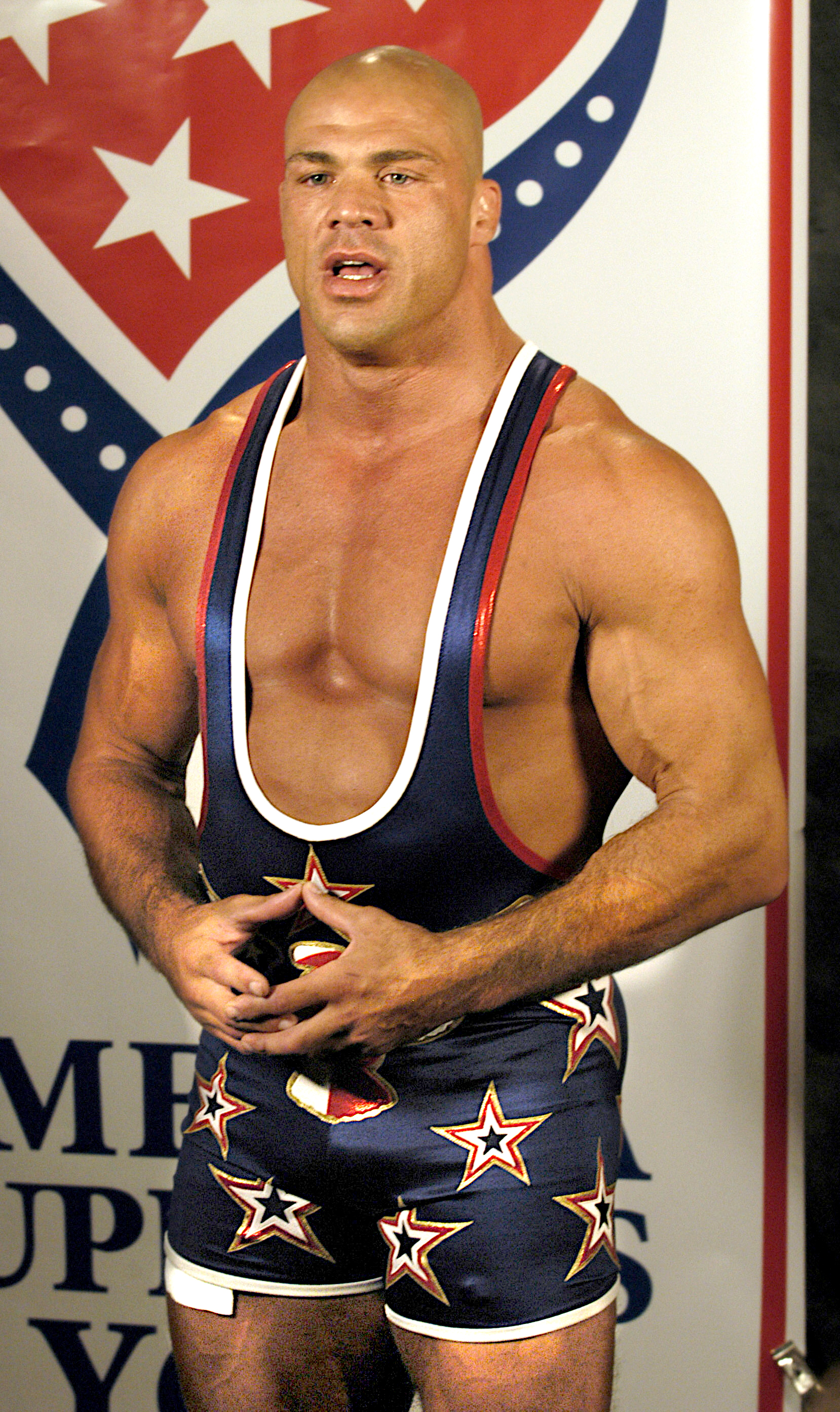
Kurt Angle, who made his AAA debut at Triplemanía XX

The third Lucha de Apuestas announced for Triplemanía XX saw AAA's chief executive officer Joaquín Roldán and his son, La Sociedad leader and AAA vice president Dorian Roldán, pick teams to face each other with the loser being shaved bald. Dorian made the challenge to his father on June 16, and on June 30 revealed the first member of his team, former AAA Mega Champion Jeff Jarrett, who also promised to bring "one of the biggest names to have ever come out of the United States" with him to Triplemanía XX. After Joaquín had revealed Electroshock as the first member of his team, he was approached by L.A. Park, who volunteered to become the second member of the team. After months of problems between the two, Park and Jarrett had finally ended their uneasy alliance at Rey de Reyes, where Jarrett first cost Park the Rey de Reyes tournament and Park retaliated by costing Jarrett the AAA Mega Championship. On April 30, Park officially quit La Sociedad to continue his rivalry with Jarrett, but during the following weeks, had also made clear that he did not want to befriend any of the AAA técnicos. After moments of hesitation, Joaquín eventually accepted Park's offer and named him the second member of his team at Triplemanía XX. On July 17, Jarrett's fellow Total Nonstop Action Wrestling (TNA) worker Kurt Angle was revealed as the second member of Dorian Roldán's team.

Other matches announced for the event include an eight-man tag team match, where AAA representatives La Parka and Los Psycho Circus (Monster Clown, Murder Clown and Psycho Clown) face Parka's rival, La Sociedad member Octagón and El Consejo members El Texano Jr., Toscano and Semental. The rivalry between Parka and Octagón had started at Rey de Reyes, where Octagón turned on his longtime partner and kicked him out of La Sociedad. Another match announced for Triplemanía XX saw four lower-card rivalries grouped into one eight-person tag team match. In the match, the técnico team included female wrestler Faby Apache, male wrestler Fénix, Mini-Estrella Octagóncito and Exótico Pimpinela Escarlata, while the rudo team included male wrestler Dark Dragon, Mini-Estrella Mini Charly Manson, female wrestler Sexy Star and Exótico Yuriko.

== Event ==
Other on-screen personnel
Role:	Name:
Commentators	Andres Maroñas
Commentators	Arturo Rivera
Commentators	Jesús Zúñiga
Commentators	Leo Riaño
Referees	Copetes Salazar
Referees	Hijo del Tirantes
Referees	Pepe Casas
Referees	Piero

=== Preliminary matches ===
The opening match of Triplemanía XX saw Dark Dragon, Mini Charly Manson, Sexy Star and Yuriko take on Faby Apache, Fénix, Octagóncito and Pimpinela Escarlata in an eight-person tag team match. After all other wrestlers ended up on the floor outside the ring, following multiple dives, Apache won the match for her team, submitting Yuriko with an armbar.

Following the opening match, AAA paid homage to the promotion's founder, Antonio Peña, while the ring crew set up a steel cage for the second match of the evening, a four-way Parejas Suicidas match, featuring the teams of Chessman and Juventud Guerrera, Extreme Tiger and Halloween, Jack Evans and Teddy Hart, and Joe Líder and Psicosis. The match was contested under escape rules, with all eight participants starting inside the cage and after only one is left inside, that person will then wrestle his partner in a Lucha de Apuestas. Psicosis allowed Halloween to climb to the top of the cage, believing that he was going to dive back in onto his opponents, but instead Halloween betrayed his Perros del Mal stablemate and became the first man to escape the cage. Extreme Tiger and Jack Evans, former AAA World Tag Team Champions, worked together against Psicosis and Teddy Hart, the other two Perros del Mal members in the match, but were then attacked by Juventud Guerrera, swinging a garbage can. Guerrera then became the second man to escape the cage and was followed shortly afterwards by Tiger, who dove from the top of the cage outside onto Halloween and Guerrera. This meant that the former La Familia de Tijuana was the first team to successfully avoid the Lucha de Apuesta. This was followed by Psicosis turning on and attacking Líder, who had publicly announced prior to the event that he hoped to lose the Parejas Suicidas match to get a shot at Psicosis' hair, before escaping the cage. Evans was the next to escape the cage, after avoiding Teddy Hart's attempts to stop him. Hart then climbed on top of the cage and dove onto Chessman and Líder with a moonsault, before climbing back up and escaping, saving himself and Evans from a Hair vs. Hair match and leaving only Chessman and Líder inside. Psicosis, realizing he was in danger of being forced to a Hair vs. Hair match, climbed up the cage and put his hand out to Líder, offering to help him up. Líder grabbed the hand and started to climb, but was dropped to the mat following a kick from Chessman, who then climbed to the top of the opposite side of the cage to become the last escapee, meaning that the former La Hermandad 187 partners were forced to a Lucha de Apustas later in the event. As Chessman celebrated at the top of the cage, the lights in the arena suddenly went out, leading to Vampiro making a surprise appearance and pushing his rival down from the top of the cage, dropping him through a set of tables on the floor of the Arena Ciudad de México. Afterwards, Chessman was stretchered out of the arena, while Vampiro showed his support for Líder in his upcoming match.

Next up was Joaquín Roldán announcing the 2012 inductee into the AAA Hall of Fame, Perro Aguayo, whose son would battle for the AAA Mega Championship later in the event. Aguayo was interrupted by Máscara Año 2000, who was accompanied by El Consejo member Argos. Máscara Año 2000, remembering the match, where he lost his mask to Aguayo, challenged his former rival to a Hair vs. Hair match, who, however, turned it down.

In the next match, Octagón teamed with El Consejo members Semental, El Texano Jr. and Toscano against La Parka and Los Psycho Circus members Monster Clown, Murder Clown and Psycho Clown in a Relevos Australianos eight-man tag team match. In the finish of the match, Octagón went for a low blow on La Parka, but accidentally caught Semental instead. Parka then rolled up the surprised Octagón for the three count and the win. After the match, El Consejo attacked Octagón, before being chased away by La Parka. La Parka then tried to convince Octagón to leave La Sociedad and re-join him, but Octagón instead just walked out. After La Parka also left the ringside area, El Consejo returned and attacked Los Psycho Circus.

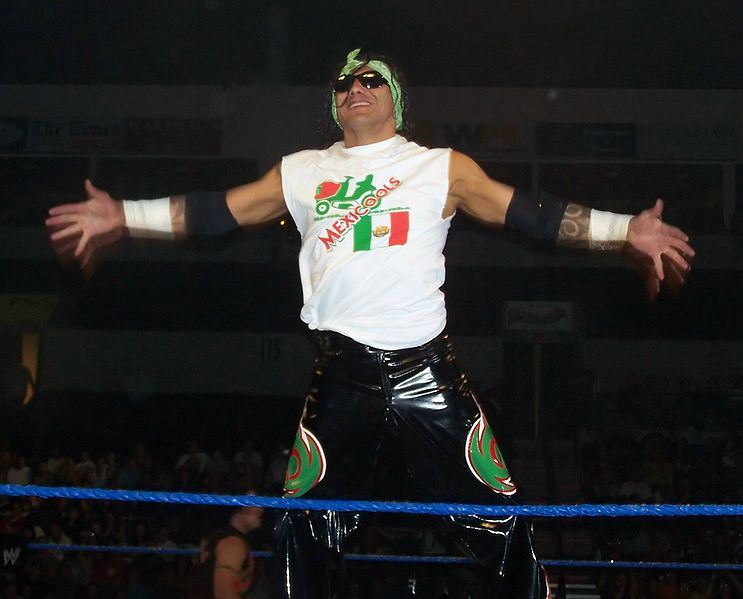
Psicosis without his mask

After a backstage segment featuring Dorian Roldán, Jeff Jarrett, Karen Jarrett, Konnan and Kurt Angle, the fourth match of the event saw Joe Líder and Psicosis face each other in a Lucha de Apuestas. Despite Psicosis announcing before the event that he would be betting his hair in case of a loss in the Parejas Suicidas match, it was announced that the match would be for Líder's hair and Psicosis' mask. However, before the match began, Líder attacked Psicosis and ripped his mask off, revealing his burned face and forcing the match to be changed to a Hair vs. Hair match. Towards the end of the hardcore brawl, Líder threw a garbage can into Psisocis' face as he was climbing to the top rope. However, when Líder went to suplex his opponent back down to the ring, Psicosis countered the move and dropped him with a flip piledriver through a table and a ladder, both propped up against the corner, and then pinned him to win the match. Afterwards, Psicosis continued the assault on his rival, dropping him onto a pile of thumbtacks, before having him shaved bald. After getting backstage, Líder and Psicosis continued brawling in the locker room, before being broken up by security.

=== Main event matches ===
The fifth match of Triplemanía XX was also a Hair vs. Hair match, contested for the hairs of Joaquín and Dorian Roldán. Joaquin led his team of Electroshock and L.A. Park into the arena, followed by Dorian and his team of Jeff Jarrett and Kurt Angle. The rudo team was also accompanied by Karen Jarrett, Jeff's wife and the former wife of Angle. Towards the end of the match, as referee Piero was busy keeping Karen out of the ring, Dorian entered and attacked Electroshock, which led to also his father entering the ring and telling him to get out. Dorian looked like he was about to leave the ringside area, only to return with La Sociedad member and half of the AAA World Tag Team Champions, Abyss, by his side. After a hot tag, L.A. Park was in control of his opponents, which led to Abyss entering the ring, only for Park to dropkick him out and hit him with a suicide dive. At this point, Dorian again entered the ring, but was followed by Joaquín, who dropped his son with a clothesline. As Jarrett went for diving crossbody, Park moved, which resulted in him taking out referee Piero instead. Park rolled Jarrett in an inside cradle, but Piero was unable to make the count. Abyss then once again entered the ring and hit Park with a chokeslam. He went to perform the same move on Electroshock, but got hit with a cutter instead. Electroshock then countered Angle's finishing maneuver, the Angle Slam, into an arm drag, before hitting him also with the cutter. Electroshock pinned Angle, as Park jumped on top of him, and scored the three count for the win, forcing Dorian Roldán to have his head shaved bald. However, before the shaving took place, Joaquín asked his son to disband La Sociedad and return to AAA, which led to Dorian apologizing for his actions and agreeing to disband the rudo stable. Jarrett tried to protest, but was shut down by Electroshock. Joaquín then announced that he did not want his son to be shaved, drawing the ire of L.A. Park. Suddenly, Dorian attacked his father, while Jarrett and Angle did the same to Electroshock and Park. Dorian then shaved his father's head, before leading La Sociedad out of the ring. Park, infuriated by what had happened, went to AAA president Marisela Peña Roldán, the wife of Joaquín and the mother of Dorian, and told her that she should have never let Joaquín get his hands on Antonio Peña's company.

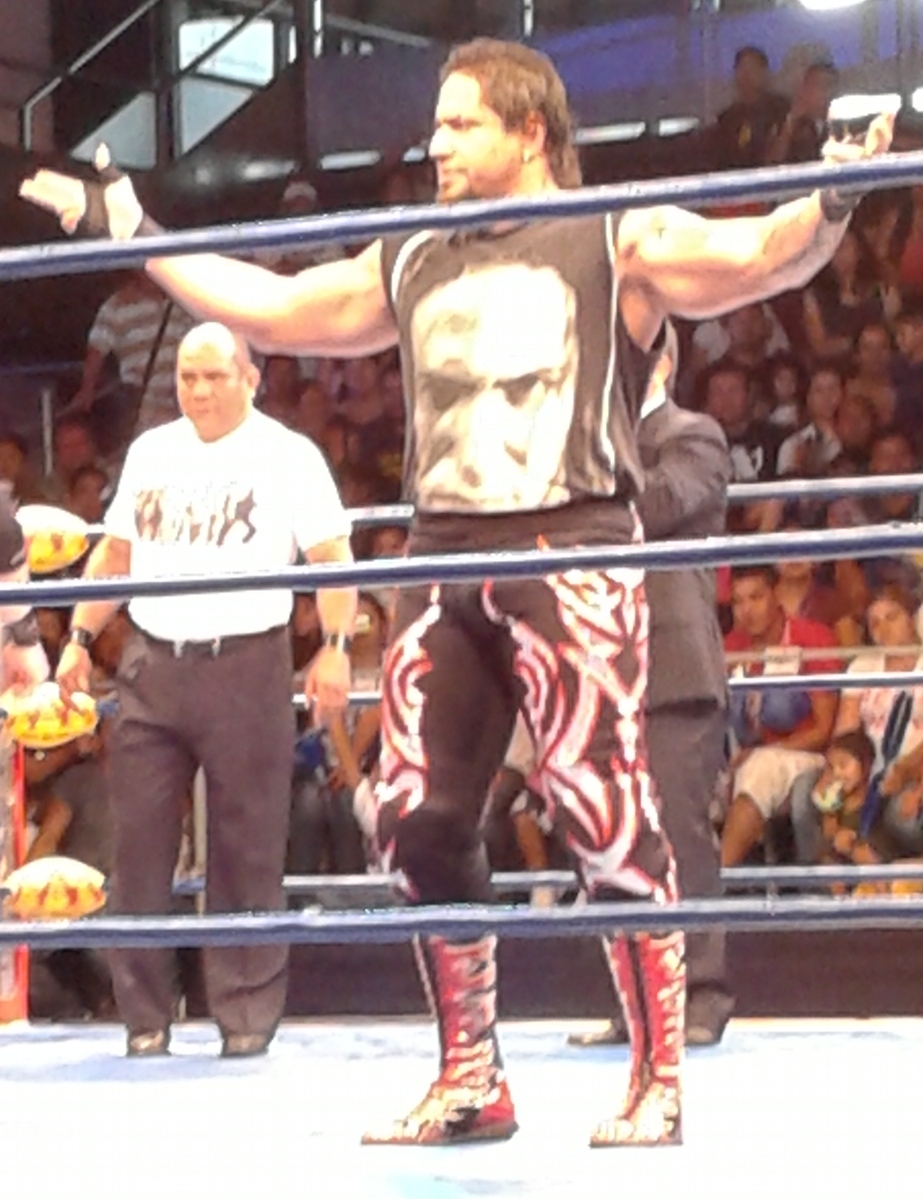
El Mesías, who successfully defended the AAA Mega Championship at Triplemanía XX

The next match saw El Hijo del Perro Aguayo challenge El Mesías for the AAA Mega Championship. The champion was accompanied to the ring by Cibernético, while the challenger was accompanied by his stablemates Héctor Garza and Taya Valkyrie. Towards the end of the bloody brawl, Aguayo went for the illegal Martinete, which would lead to an automatic disqualification, but was stopped by Garza, leading to an argument between the two stablemates. Garza then attempted to hit El Mesías with a steel chair, but accidentally hit Aguayo instead. As Aguayo began bleeding heavily, the match was stopped for a moment as a doctor entered the ring to check on the cut on his head; Aguayo, however, kept avoiding the doctor, not wanting the match to be ended. El Mesías then speared his challenger through a table for the win and to retain the AAA Mega Championship. Afterwards, Cibernético immediately climbed to the ring and jumped on top of the bloody Aguayo, mocking him, while El Mesías received his title belt. Cibernético then went out of the ring and pushed Hall of Famer Perro Aguayo, who was seated in the front row, before being pulled away by an irate El Mesías as Los Perros del Mal members Halloween, Psicosis and Teddy Hart came ringside to check on the condition of the challenger. Garza attempted to do the same, but was pulled away from Aguayo by Halloween, Psicosis and Hart, who blamed him for the loss. Eventually Los Perros del Mal helped their leader backstage, with Garza following behind.

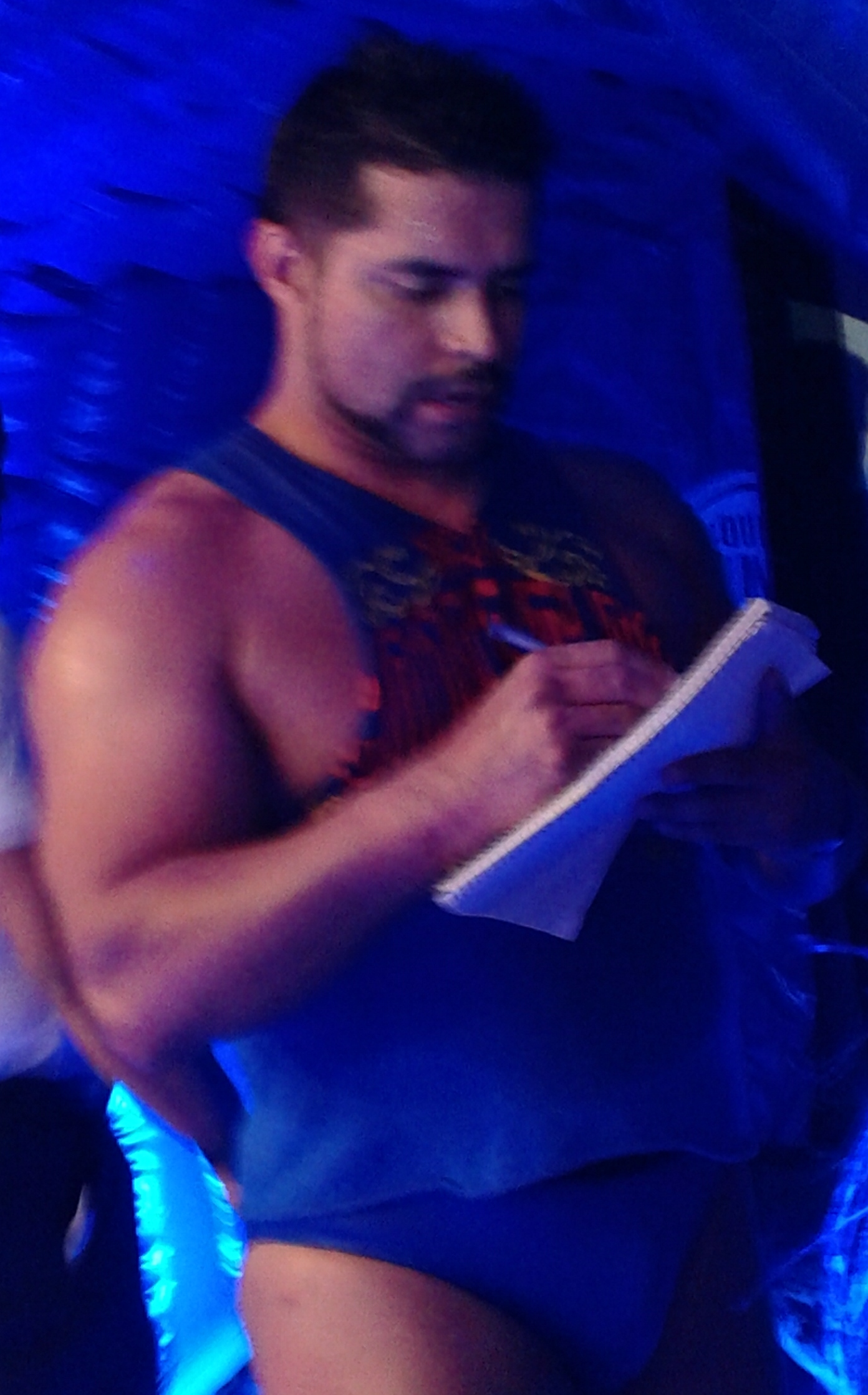
Máscara Año 2000 Jr., who lost his mask in the main event of Triplemanía XX

In the main event of the evening, Dr. Wagner Jr., accompanied by his brother Silver King and son El Hijo de Dr. Wagner Jr., faced Máscara Año 2000 Jr., accompanied by his father Máscara Año 2000, in a Mask vs. Mask match. Máscara Año 2000 interfered in the match on several occasions, and when, towards the end of the match, he interfered once again, Silver King grabbed a steel chair and looked to attack him, but instead turned on his brother. As the fans in attendance started to fill the ring with trash, El Hijo de Dr. Wagner Jr. entered and attacked his uncle and Máscara Año 2000, but was then taken out by Máscara Año 2000 Jr. The El Consejo member was now in full control of the match, but when he was unable to finish Wagner Jr., Silver King and Máscara Año 2000 once again returned to the ring. However, so did El Hijo de Dr. Wagner Jr., who dove onto the two men with a flying kick, taking them out of the equation. He then gave a glass bottle to his father, who broke it over Máscara Año 2000 Jr.'s head and then dropped him with his finishing maneuver, the Wagner Driver, for the win. Following the match, Máscara Año 2000 Jr. was unmasked by his daughter, while he revealed that he was Ángel Reyes, originally from Lagos de Moreno, Jalisco. The twentieth Triplemanía ended with Wagner Jr. celebrating in the ring.

== Aftermath ==
Following Triplemanía XX, Silver King, who also had a past working for CMLL, announced that he had been behind El Consejo from the beginning, revealing himself as the rudo group's leader. Meanwhile, El Hijo del Perro Aguayo claimed that AAA did not want him as the promotion's top champion and suggested that Héctor Garza could have been in cahoots with the promotion, but promised his stable would investigate what happened at the event, before making their decision about Garza. On August 10 at the first television tapings after Triplemanía XX, Los Perros del Mal turned on Garza and kicked him out of the stable following a beatdown, which required him to be stretchered out of the arena. Meanwhile, in the main event of the evening, Máscara Año 2000 Jr. avenged his Triplemanía XX loss by defeating Dr. Wagner Jr. in a rematch, following interference from Silver King. On August 18, Cibernético continued his rivalry with El Hijo del Perro Aguayo and Los Perros del Mal by combining his two previous stables, Los Bizarros and La Secta, to form the new stable La Secta Bizarra Cibernetica. The year-long rivalry eventually culminated in a Hair vs. Hair Lucha de Apuestas between Cibernético and Aguayo at Triplemanía XXI.

== Results ==
No.	Results	Stipulations	Times
1	Faby Apache, Fénix, Octagóncito and Pimpinela Escarlata defeated Dark Dragon, Mini Charly Manson, Sexy Star and Yuriko	Relevos Atómicos de Locura	12:05
2	La Hermandad 187 (Joe Líder and Psicosis) were defeated by Chessman and Juventud Guerrera, La Familia de Tijuana (Extreme Tiger and Halloween), and The Hart Foundation 2.0 (Jack Evans and Teddy Hart)	Four-way tag team Parejas Suicidas steel cage match	12:23
3	La Parka and Los Psycho Circus (Monster Clown, Murder Clown and Psycho Clown) defeated El Consejo (Semental, El Texano Jr. and Toscano) and Octagón	Relevos Australianos eight-man tag team match	07:12
4	Psicosis defeated Joe Líder	Hair vs. Hair Lucha de Apuestas	11:02
5	Team Joaquín Roldán (Electroshock and L.A. Park) (with Joaquín Roldán) defeated Team Dorian Roldán (Jeff Jarrett and Kurt Angle) (with Dorian Roldán and Karen Jarrett)	Tag team Hair vs. Hair Lucha de Apuestas for Roldáns' hairs	19:13
6	El Mesías (c) (with Cibernético) defeated El Hijo del Perro Aguayo (with Héctor Garza and Taya Valkyrie)	Singles match for the AAA Mega Championship	13:43
7	Dr. Wagner Jr. (with El Hijo de Dr. Wagner Jr. and Silver King) defeated Máscara Año 2000 Jr. (with Máscara Año 2000)	Mask vs. Mask Lucha de Apuestas	14:34
(c) / – the champion(s) heading into the match
