= Promo Azteca =

Mexican professional wrestling promotion

- Acronym: AZTECA(S)
- Founded: 1995
- Defunct: 1998
- Style: Professional wrestling Lucha libre Hardcore wrestling
- Headquarters: Tijuana
- Founder(s): Fuerza Guerrera (PROMELL); Konnan (AZTECA)
- Owner(s): Konnan; Jorge Rojas; Ricardo Reyes
- Parent: TV Azteca
- Formerly: Promotora Mexicana de Lucha Libre

Promo Azteca (AZTECA, originally known as Promotora Mexicana de Lucha Libre, PROMELL) was a professional wrestling promotion that was founded in Tijuana, Mexico, by Fuerza Guerrera in 1995. It was taken over by Konnan, Ricardo Reyes and Jorge Rojas the following year and was home to many of the luchadors wrestling for World Championship Wrestling (WCW) during the late-1990s.

Promo Azteca sought to become the third national wrestling promotion in Mexico with the support of Televisión Azteca, the country's second-largest television network; however, WCW eventually withdrew its support and banned luchadors under WCW contract from working for Promo Azteca. Promo Azteca was unable to recover from this loss and closed at the end of 1998.

== History ==
Promo Azteca had its origins in 1995 under the Promotora Mexicana de Lucha Libre banner owned by Fuerza Guerrera. Guerrera initially co-promoted shows with AAA until selling the company that same year to Konnan, Ricardo Reyes, Jorge Rojas and the TV Azteca network. In October 1996, Konnan left AAA after a falling out with owner Antonio Pena and brought a number of its younger stars with him including, most notably, Juventud Guerrera, Rey Misterio Jr., Super Calo, La Parka and Psicosis.

Many were competing in World Championship Wrestling's (WCW) new cruiserweight division at the time and shared much of Konnan's frustrations with AAA's management over money. These luchadors were on limited contracts in WCW which meant they were paid only for the nights they worked rather than receiving a yearly salary. Once leaving the AAA, however, this left them with a lot of spare time and few opportunities to work in Mexico. One of the key reasons Konnan took over Promo Azteca was to establish a place where he and other luchadors could compete when they were not wrestling in the United States. WCW agreed to let those under contract continue wrestling in their native country when they were not needed at live events. He and Rojas envisioned these wrestlers as Promo Azteca's main stars.

== Notable talent ==
In addition to the former AAA talent that followed Konnan to Promo Azteca, older veterans such as Angel Azteca, Blue Panther, Cien Caras, Máscara Año 2000 and Universo Dos Mil were also involved. In early 1997, Konnan formed a version of the New World Order with Damián 666, Halloween, Psicosis and Los Villanos (Villano IV and Villano V). Other WCW luchadors to regularly appear in Promo Azteca included El Dandy, Hector Garza, Lizmark Jr. and Norman Smiley.

The promotion featured a number of then-unknown wrestlers who would become major stars in Mexico and the United States during the next decade, including Ephesto (then known as Pantera del Ring), Mr. Águila, Toscano, Último Guerrero, Último Rebelde, and El Zorro. Super Crazy, in particular, was considered the standout star of its cruiserweight division. He rose to prominence during a feud with Venum Black, which culminated on March 6, 1997 in a "mask vs. hair" Lucha de Apuestas, or "bet match", that Super Crazy won, and later found success in the U.S. with Extreme Championship Wrestling (ECW).

Some visiting Japanese wrestlers made their first appearances in Mexico with Promo Azteca such as CIMA, Kaz Hayashi and Yoshihiro Tajiri.

== Style and television ==
Promo Azteca was presented as a "rebel" wrestling promotion, similar to Extreme Championship Wrestling in the United States. It is notable for introducing "hardcore wrestling" and other elements of American-style pro wrestling to Mexican audiences. One of these, the one-fall match, was later adopted by AAA. Promo Azteca had the support of TV Azteca, one of the largest networks in Mexico, and from which the promotion's name was derived. TV Azteca was eager to compete against Televisa, which aired both AAA and CMLL television programming. Its American counterpart ECW, on the other hand, struggled for years to secure a spot on a U.S. television network. Promo Azteca's televised events aired weekly on Friday nights from October 1996 to March 1998. Promo Azteca TV was reportedly set to resume after the 1998 FIFA World Cup, but the show did not return to television. Though it did not air in the U.S., the series was covered by the Wrestling Observer Newsletter.

== Role in the Mexican and U.S. promotional wars ==
I had amassed so much talent in my promotion, which was called Promo Azteca, because I changed the way wrestling was shot, I changed the way wrestling was produced. I was doing a lot of stuff, like, instead of the best 2-out-of-3 falls, which is very corny to me, I would only do one fall. I was just really revolutionizing the product so all the young guys really wanted to be with me, plus I had access into WCW. So I was basically cherry-picking the best wrestlers from both promotions [AAA and CMLL] and, I mean, I almost put Peña out of business. Almost. And for the first time in more than 70 years, Paco Alonso, the owner of Arena Mexico, had to give out guaranteed contracts which he'd never done in his career. So both of them had an axe to grind with me and so when Eric made me close up shop, you know, some wrestlers went [back] to either company [but] some wrestlers were never able to get work. And I was like the "Lee Harvey Oswald" [of lucha libre], you know what I'm saying?

— ROH Straight Shootin' Series (2006)

At the time of Promo Azteca's founding, a major promotional war was being fought between Mexico's two major promotions: AAA and Consejo Mundial de Lucha Libre (CMLL). The emergence of a "renegade" promotion such as Promo Azteca added to an already chaotic situation in the world of lucha libre. Promo Azteca enjoyed an exclusive partnership with World Championship Wrestling, partially due to Konnan's involvement in developing WCW's cruiserweight division. This encouraged many luchadors to defect from AAA and CMLL in the hopes of working for the U.S. promotion. Kevin Quinn, Steele, Super Astro and The Headhunters were among CMLL talent to jump to Promo Azteca. When La Parka, Máscara Sagrada and other luchador enmascarados left AAA for Promo Azteca, however, the promotion countered by having other wrestlers portray the originals resulting in two versions wrestling on national television. The departure of La Parka was an especially serious setback for AAA and he was later blackballed by the promotion. According to Konnan, he and other AAA stars were also denied work by promoters upon returning to Mexico in 2001.

Promo Azteca also had a role in the U.S. promotional rivalry between WCW and the World Wrestling Federation. Konnan, convincing many of WCW's interest showcasing lucha libre-style wrestling, was able to lure Mexican talent away from the WWF's fledgling cruiserweight division. Víctor Quiñones, a key figure in the CMLL-WWF talent exchange agreement, jumped to Promo Azteca in September 1997. That same month, WCW President Eric Bischoff brokered a meeting with Konnan and rival CMLL promoter Paco Alonzo. Bischoff, interested in CMLL's talent and association with Televsia, was reportedly unable to negotiate a truce between the two men. Konnan was also upset over Mike Tenay filming CMLL wrestlers that summer for a series of documentary shorts on Mexican wrestling. It was speculated by the Pro Wrestling Torch that WCW's interest in CMLL was partly motivated by curbing the power of Konnan's crew of Mexican talent in WCW.

== Demise ==
For a brief time, Promo Azteca's superior talent and backing from TV Azteca threatened to overtake both AAA and CMLL as Mexico's top lucha libre promotion. In November 1997, Pro Wrestling Illustrated ranked Promo Azteca among the top promotions in the world. However, its success was short-lived. WCW, fearing its luchadors would become injured, withdrew its support and banned those under contract from working in Promo Azteca. Konnan's wrestling career in the U.S. also prevented him from devoting his full attention to Promo Azteca. The promotion struggled for a while longer, largely relying on regulars in the Mexican independent wrestling scene, but was ultimately unable to recover from losing the WCW luchadors. It held a few interpromotional shows with CMLL before quietly closing its doors at the end of 1998.

== Alumni ==
=== Male wrestlers ===
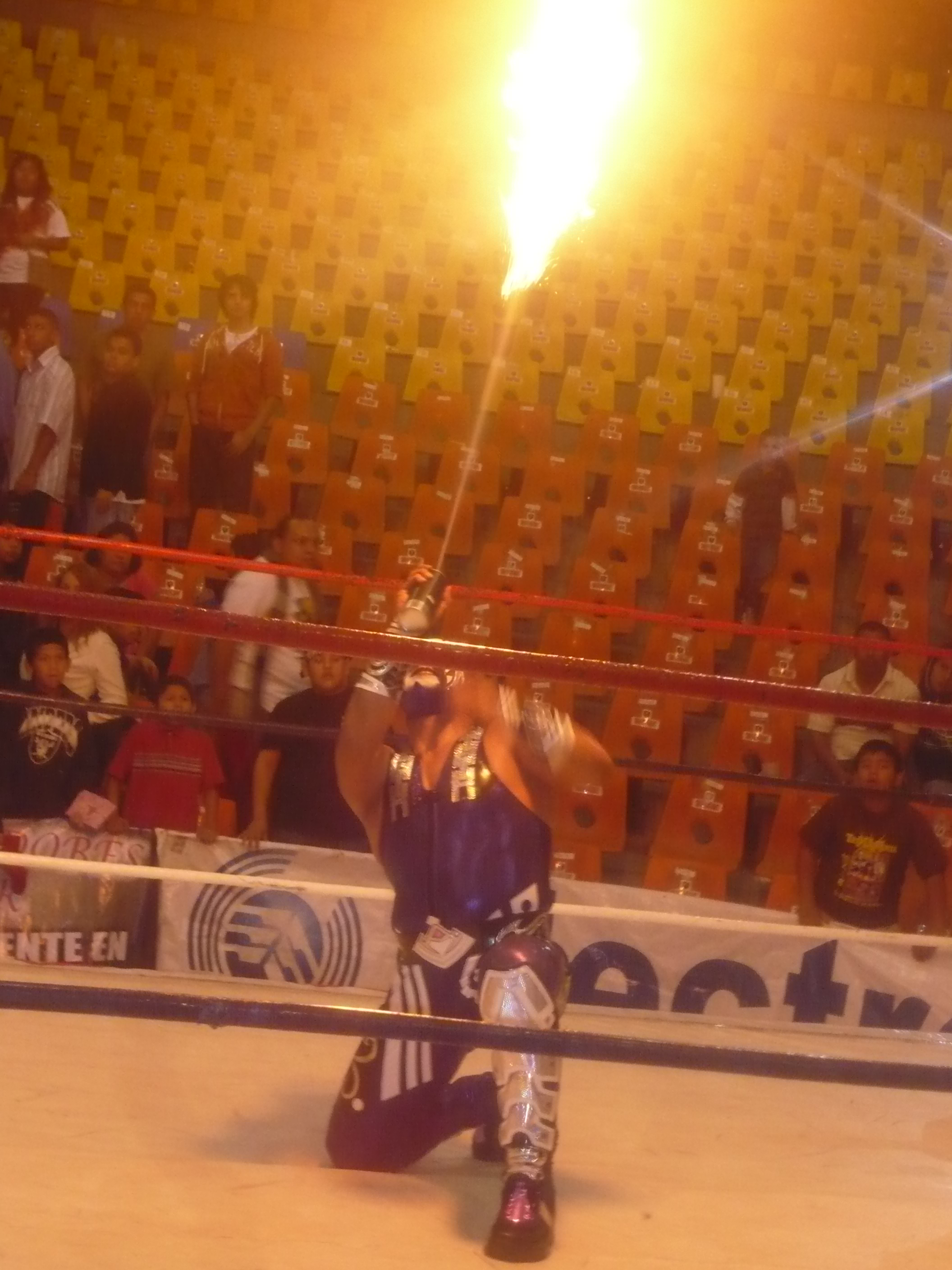
Abismo Negro

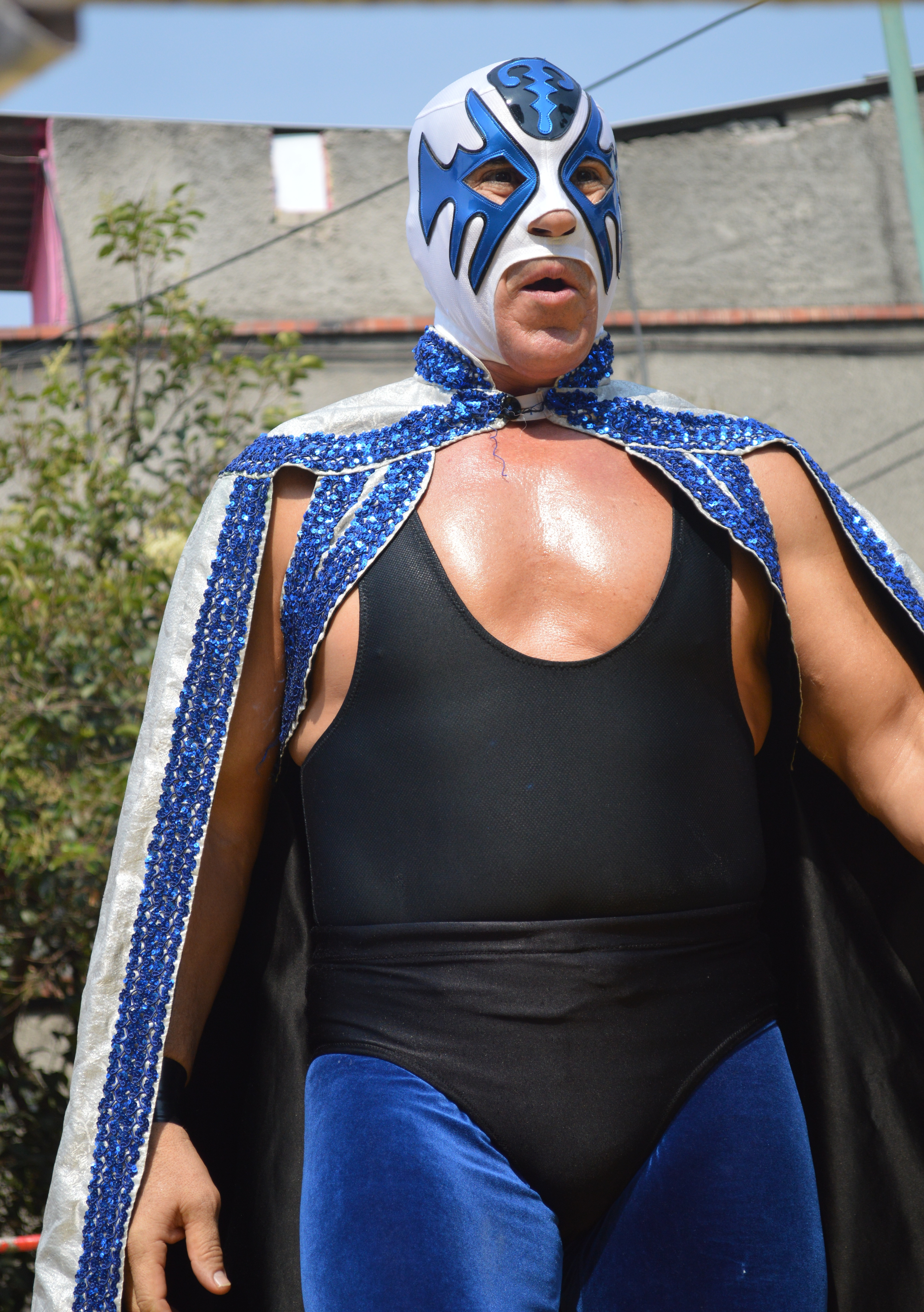
Atlantis

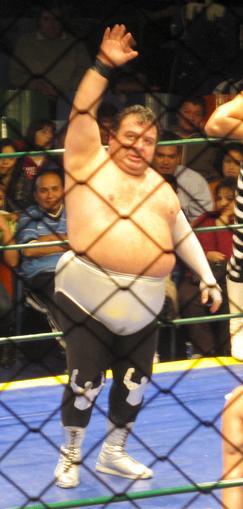
Brazo de Plata

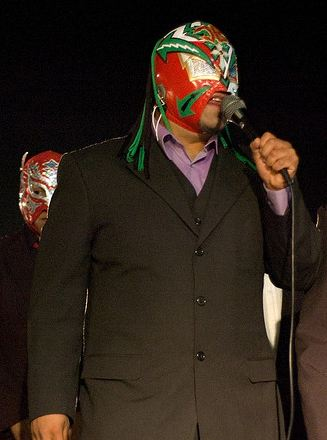
Crazy Boy

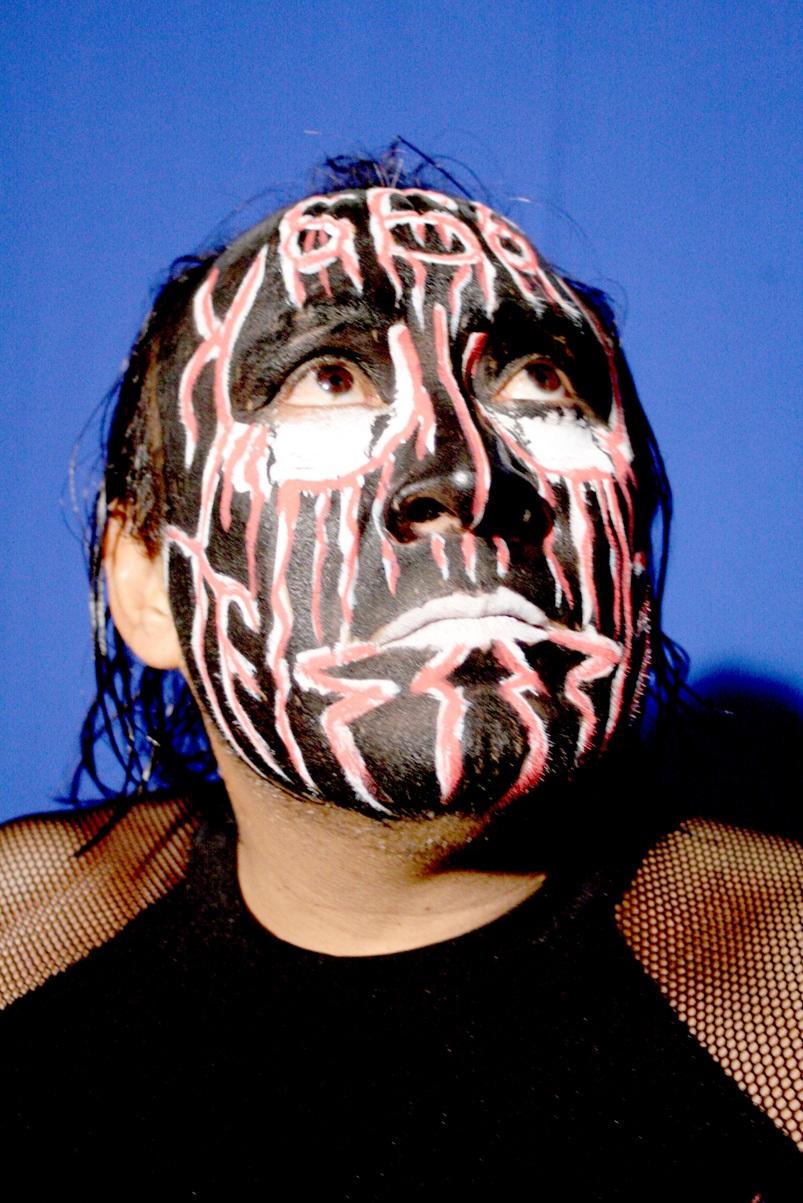
Damián 666

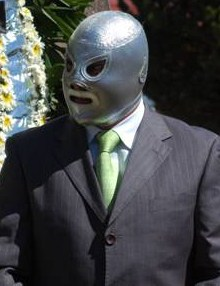
Hijo del Santo

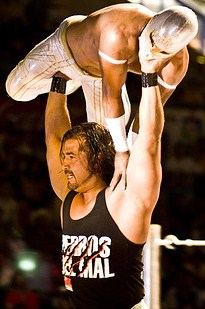
Hector Garza

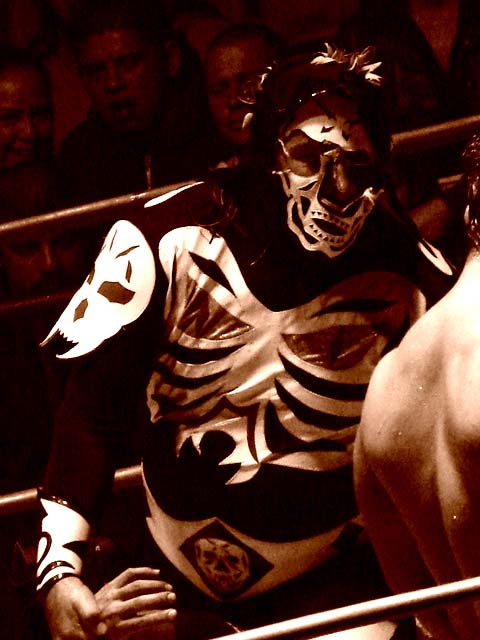
La Parka

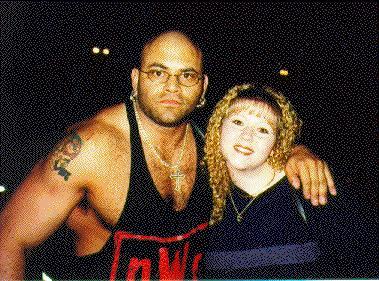
Konnan

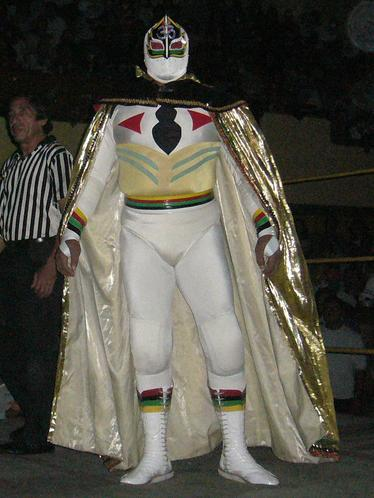
Máscara Sagrada

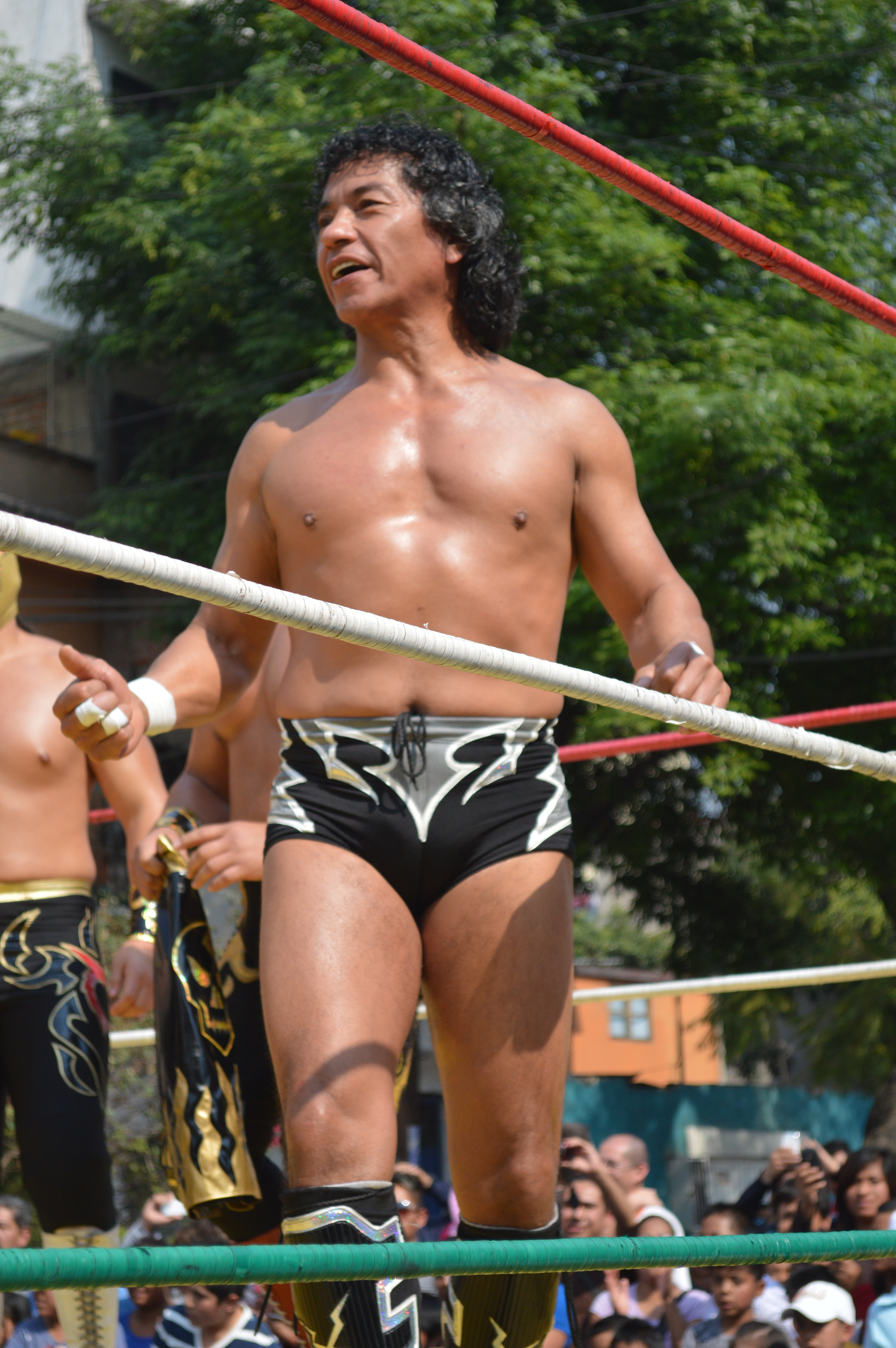
Negro Casas

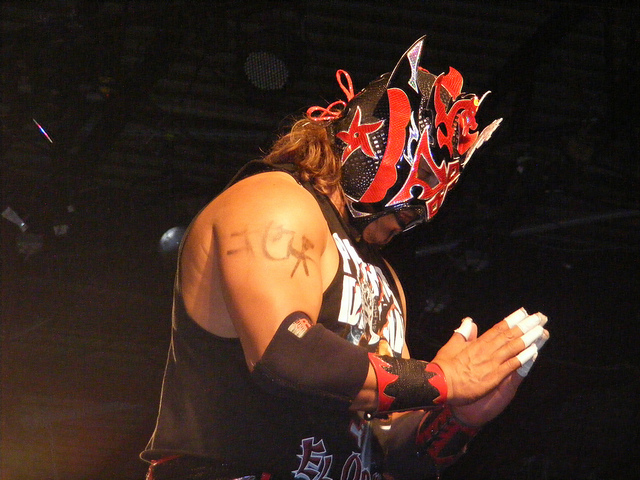
El Oriental

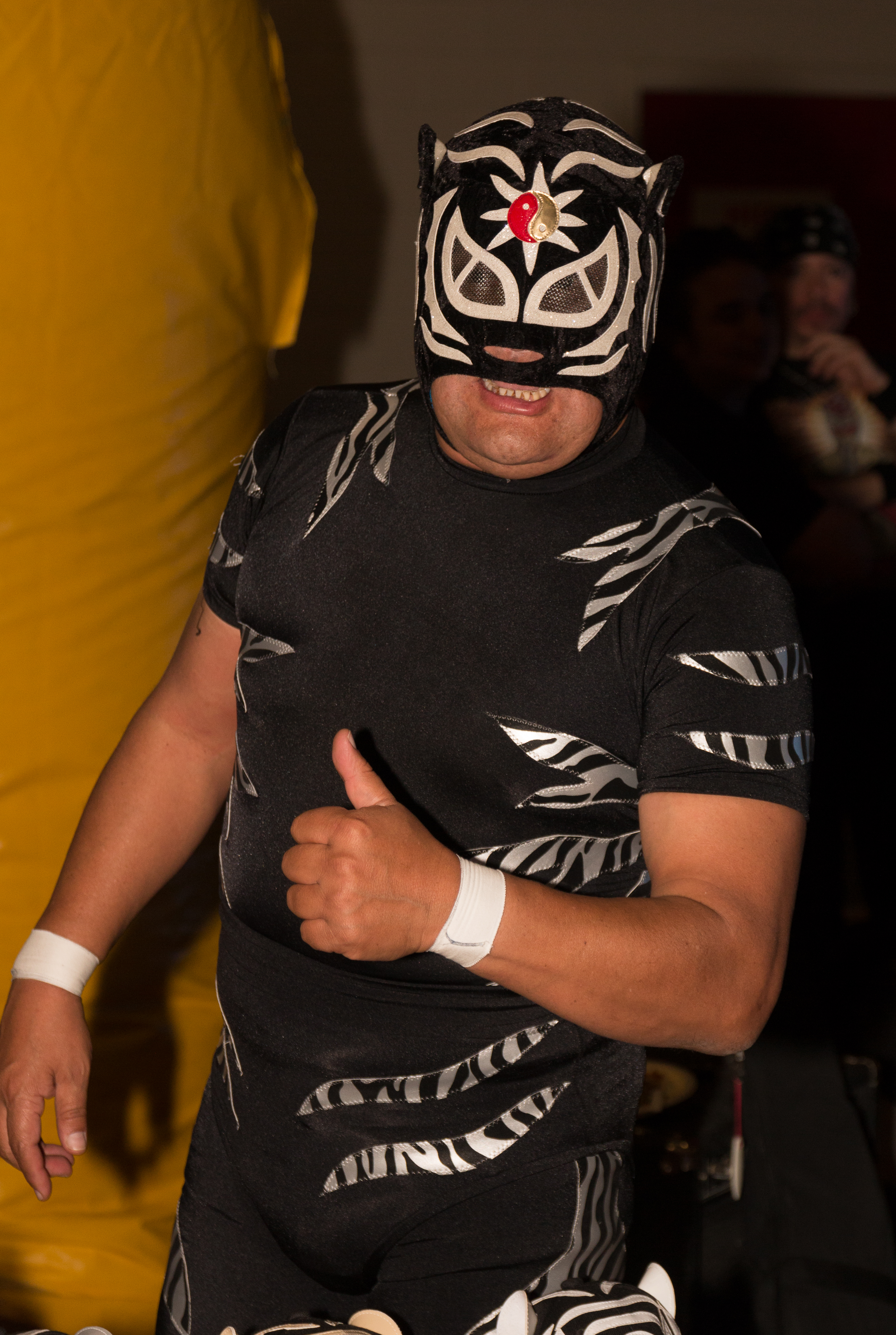
El Pantera

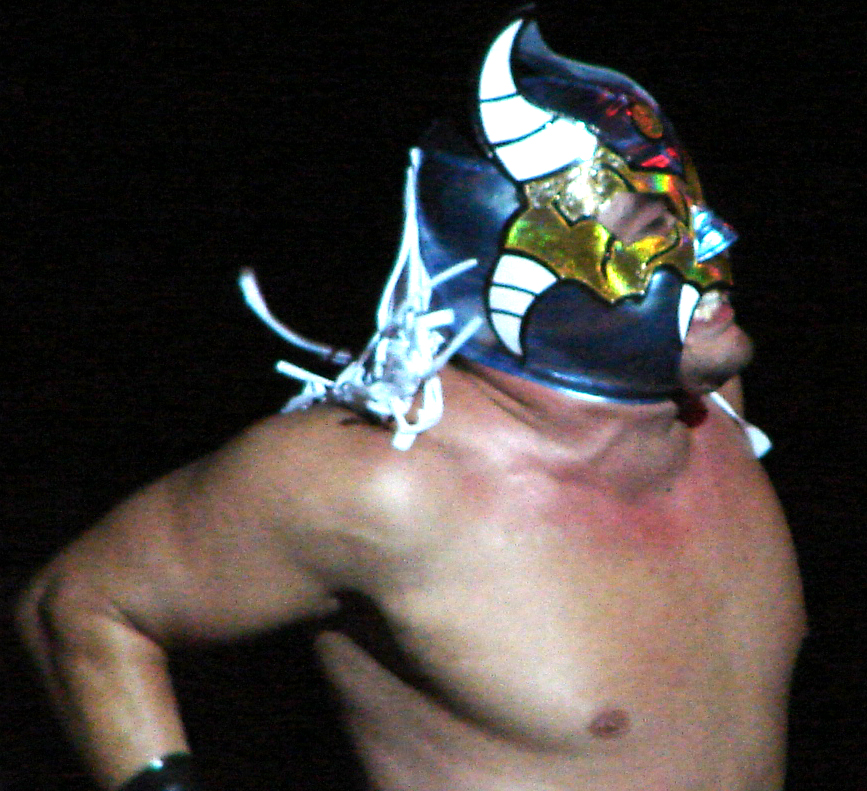
Rencor Latino

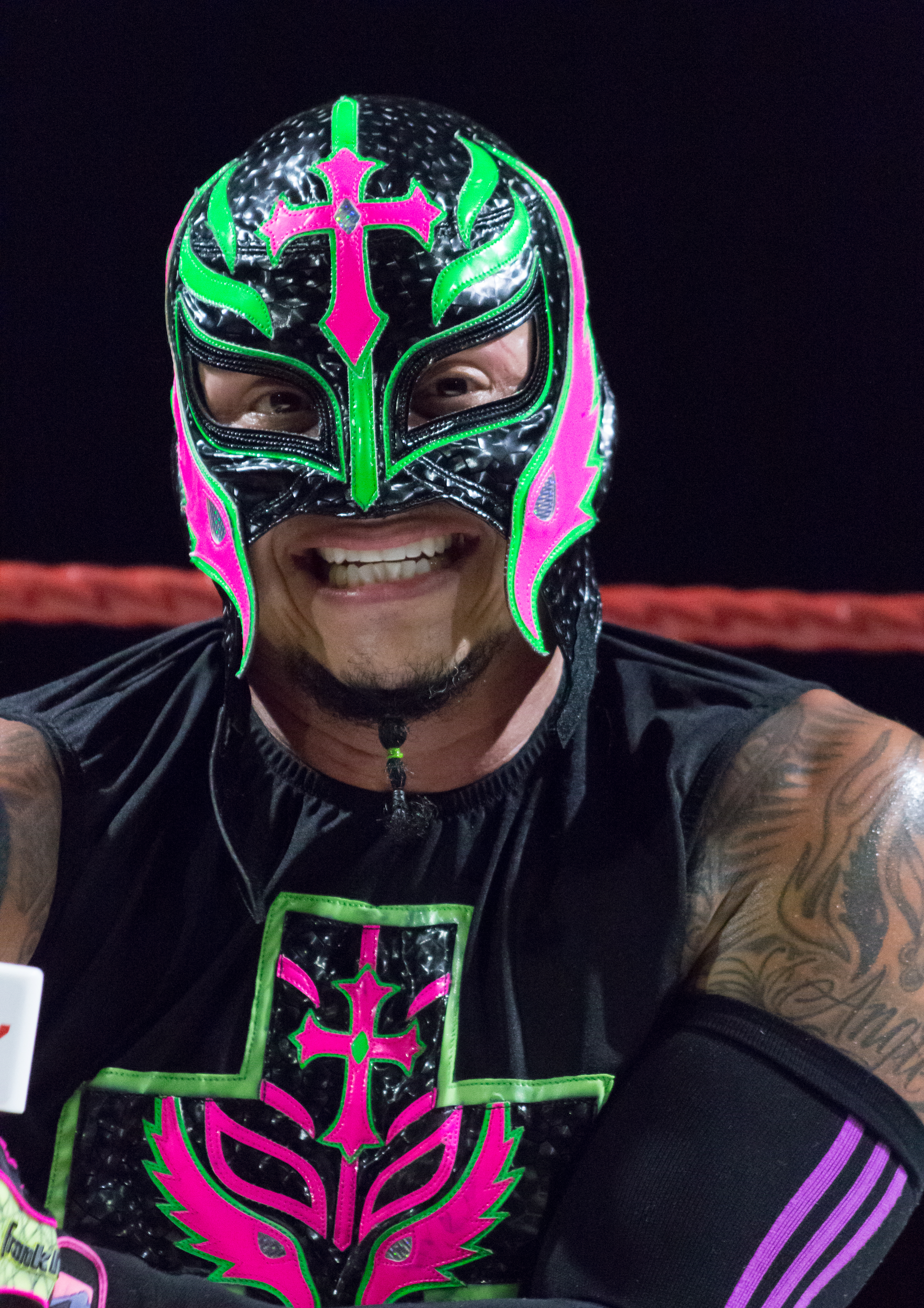
Rey Misterio Jr.

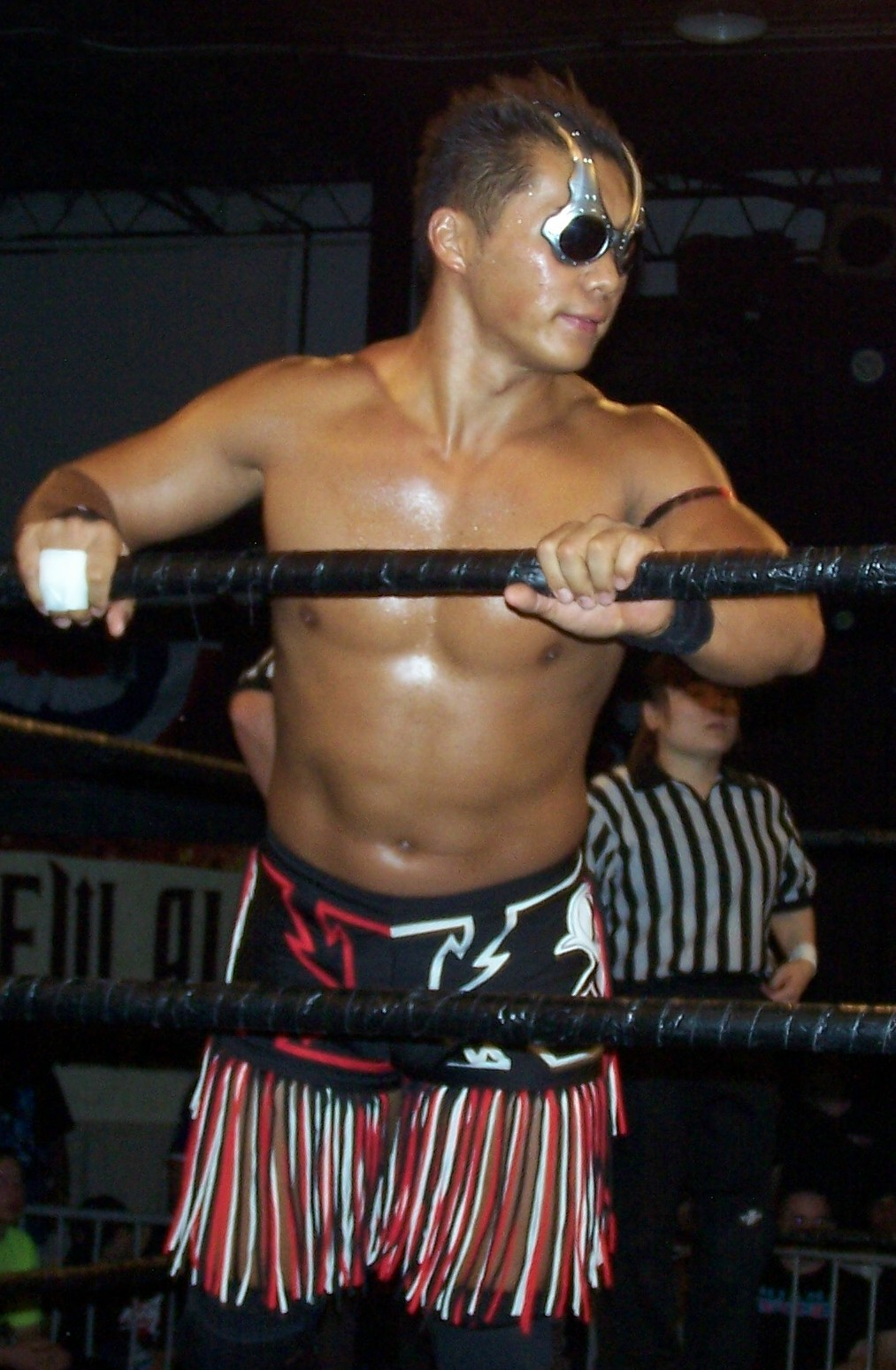
Shiima Nobunaga

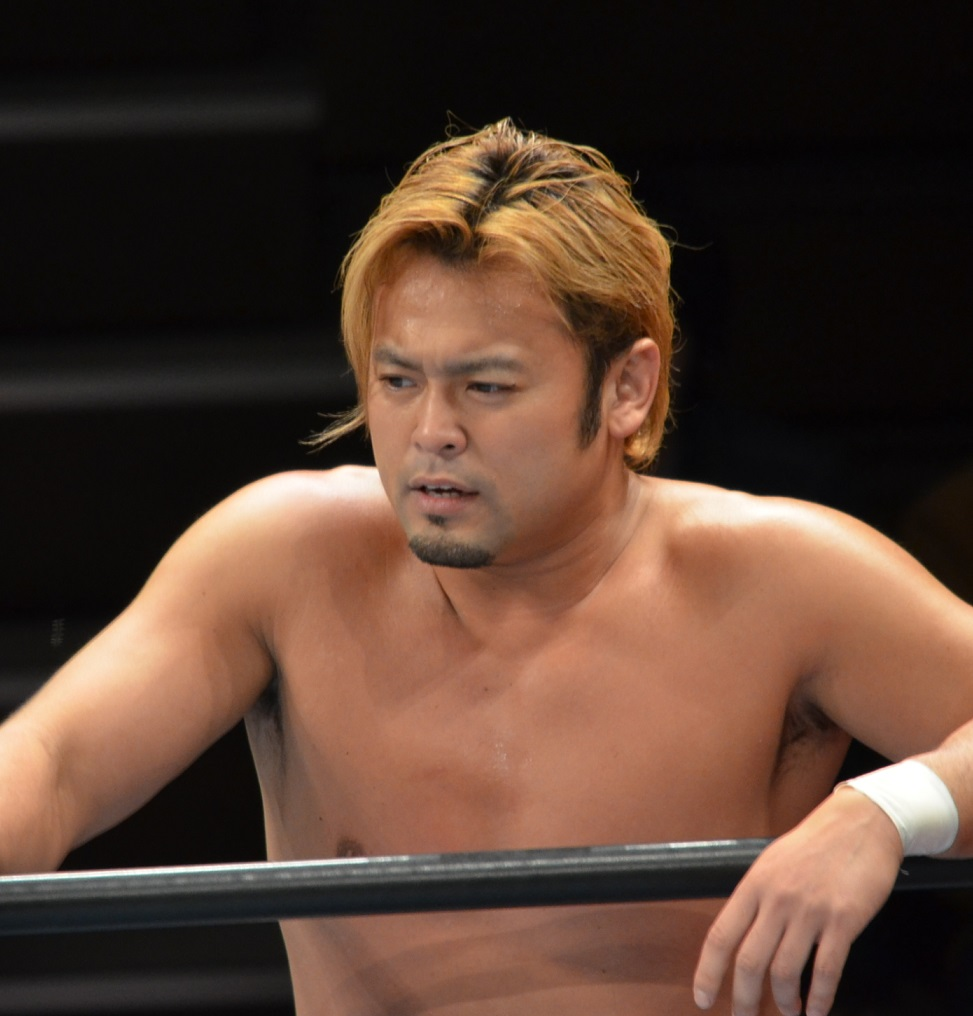
Shiryu

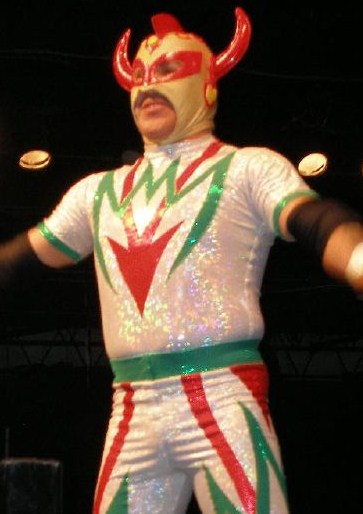
Skayde

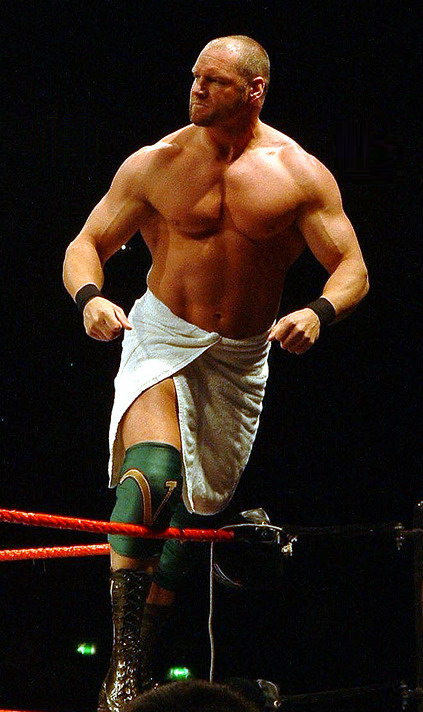
El Steele

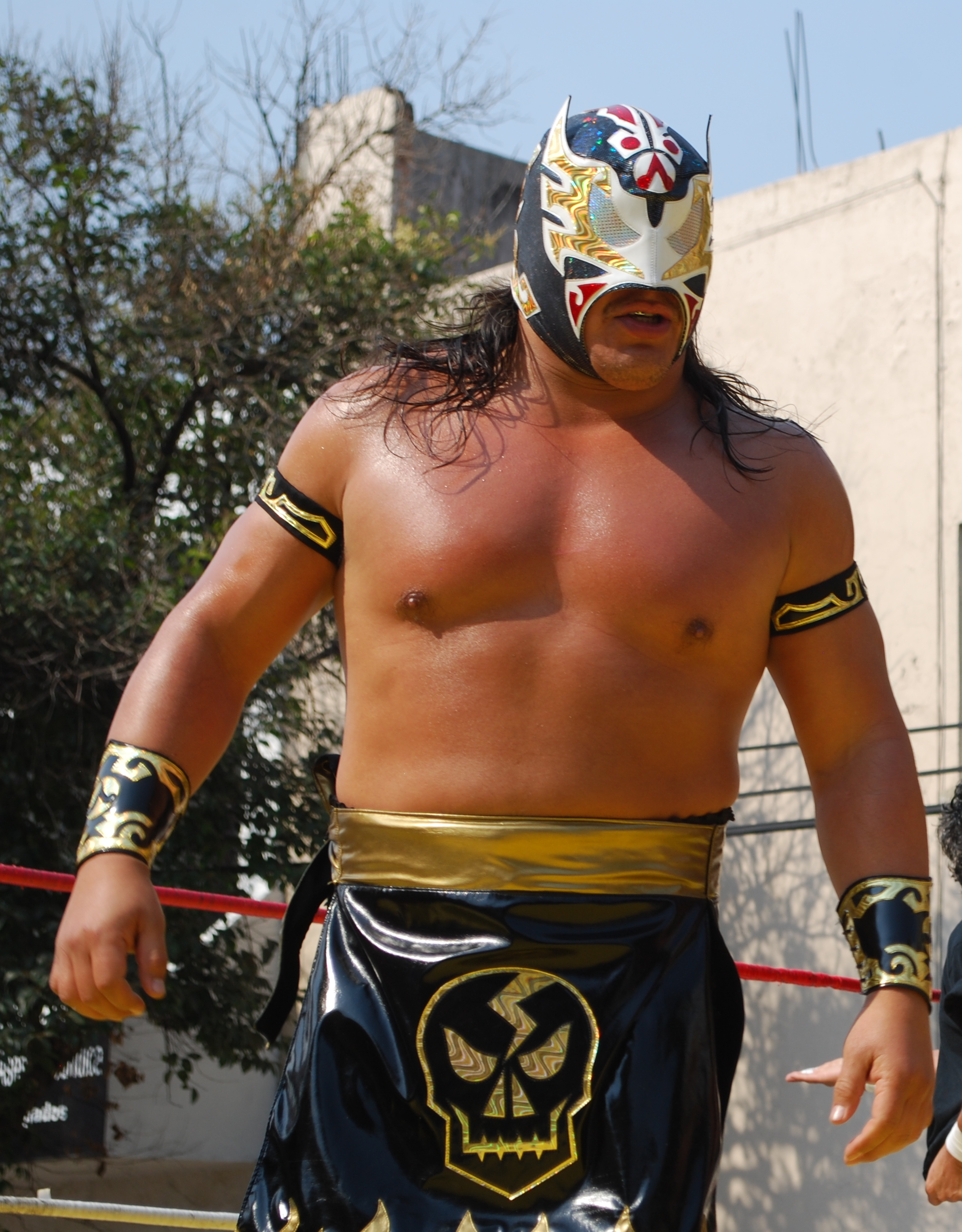
Último Guerrero

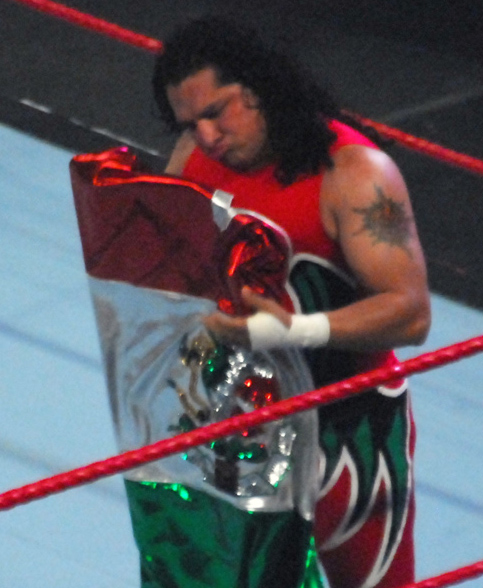
Super Crazy

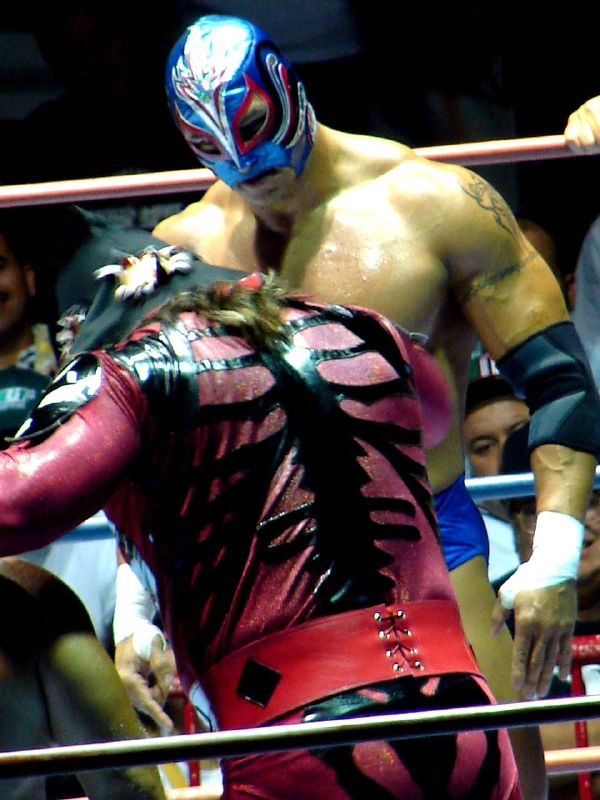
Olímpico

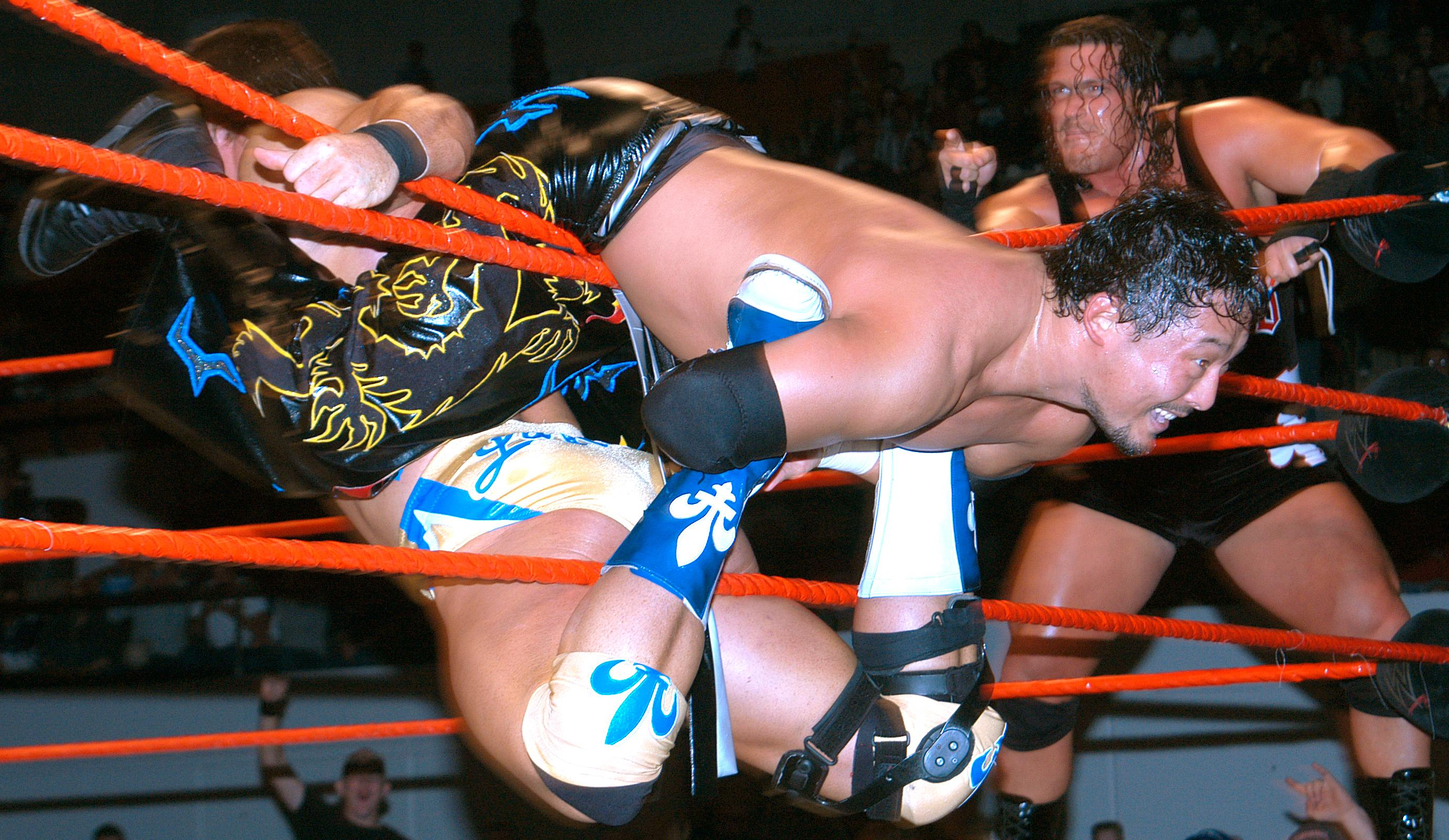
Tajiri

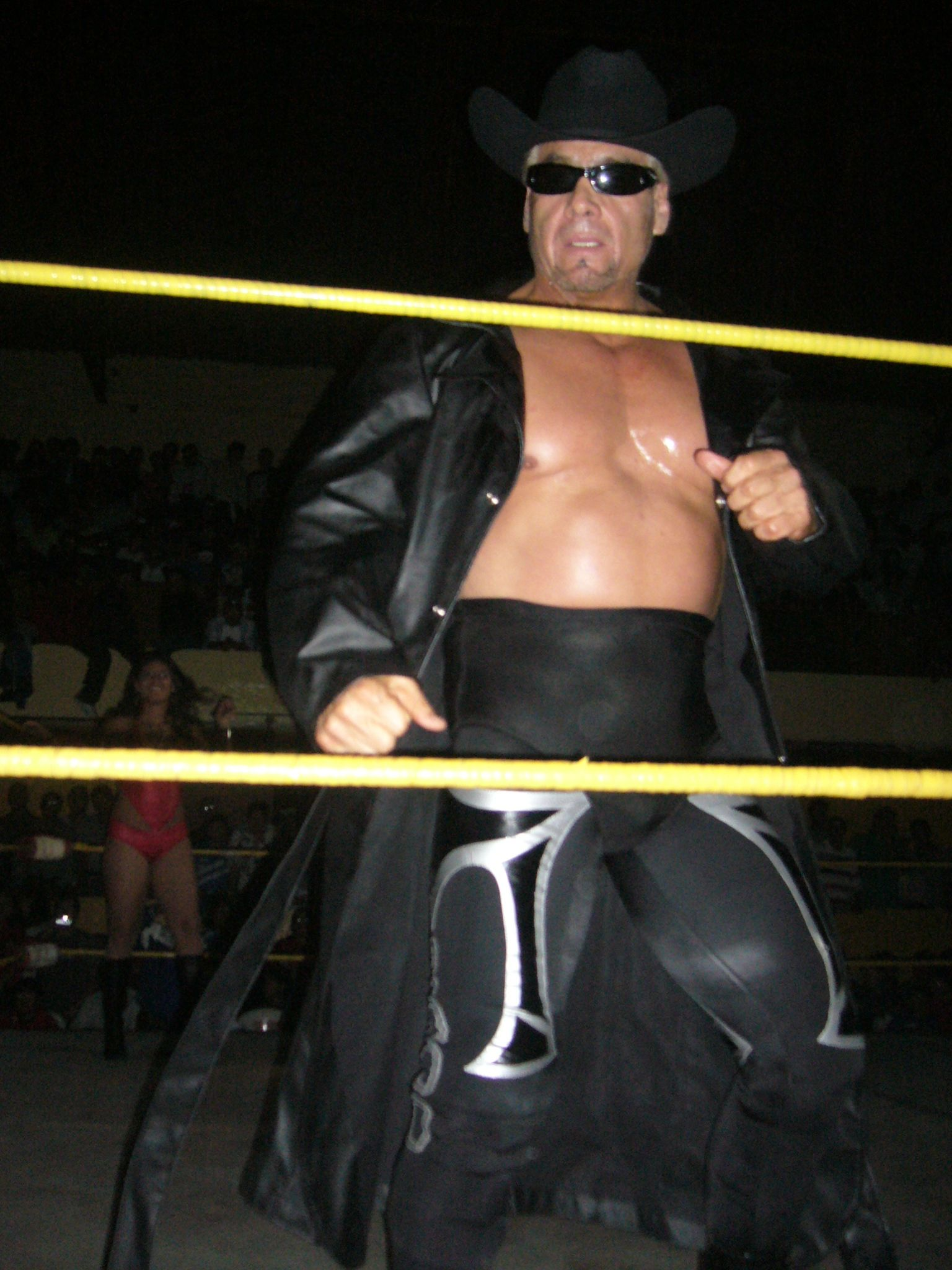
Universo 2000

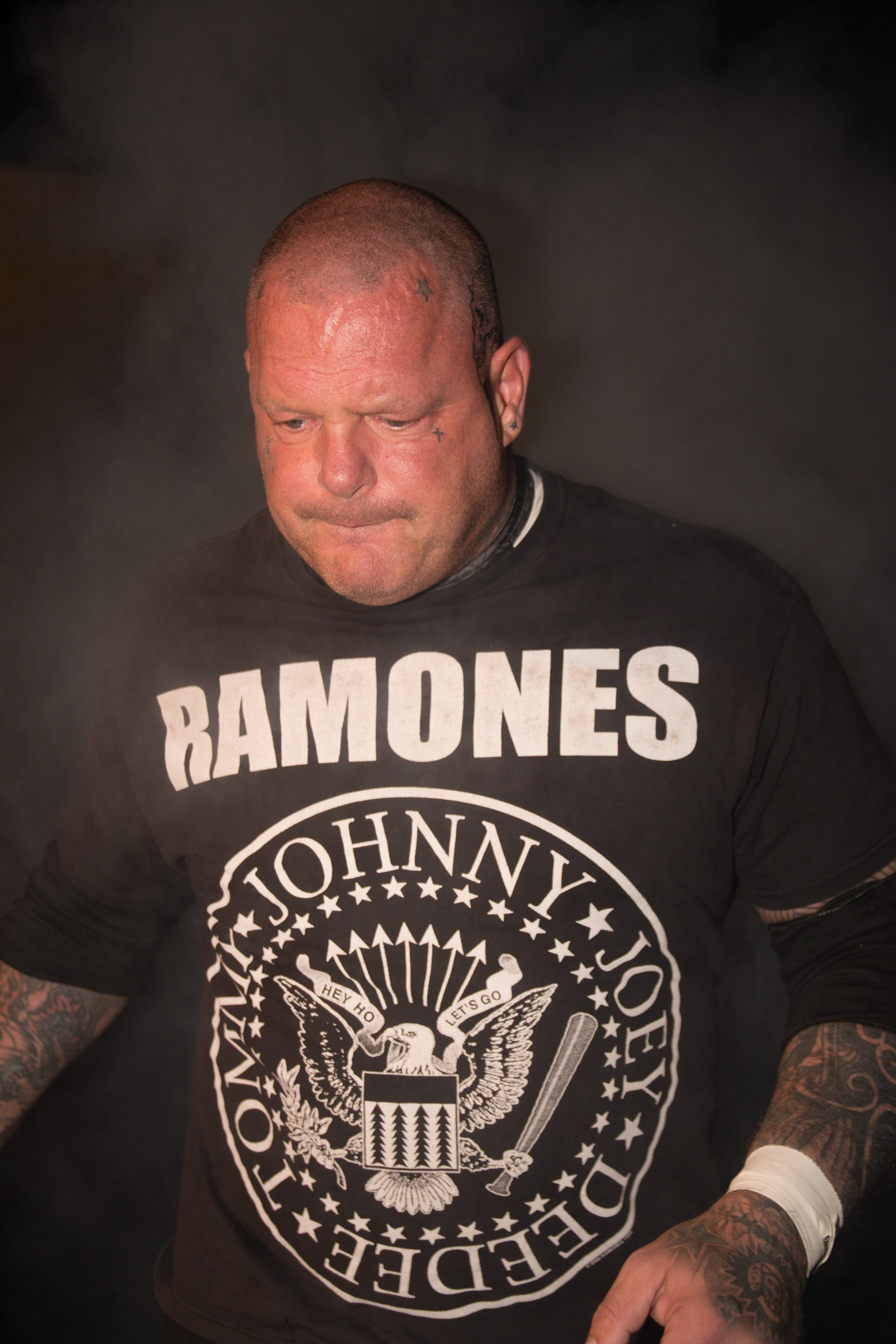
Vampiro Canadiense

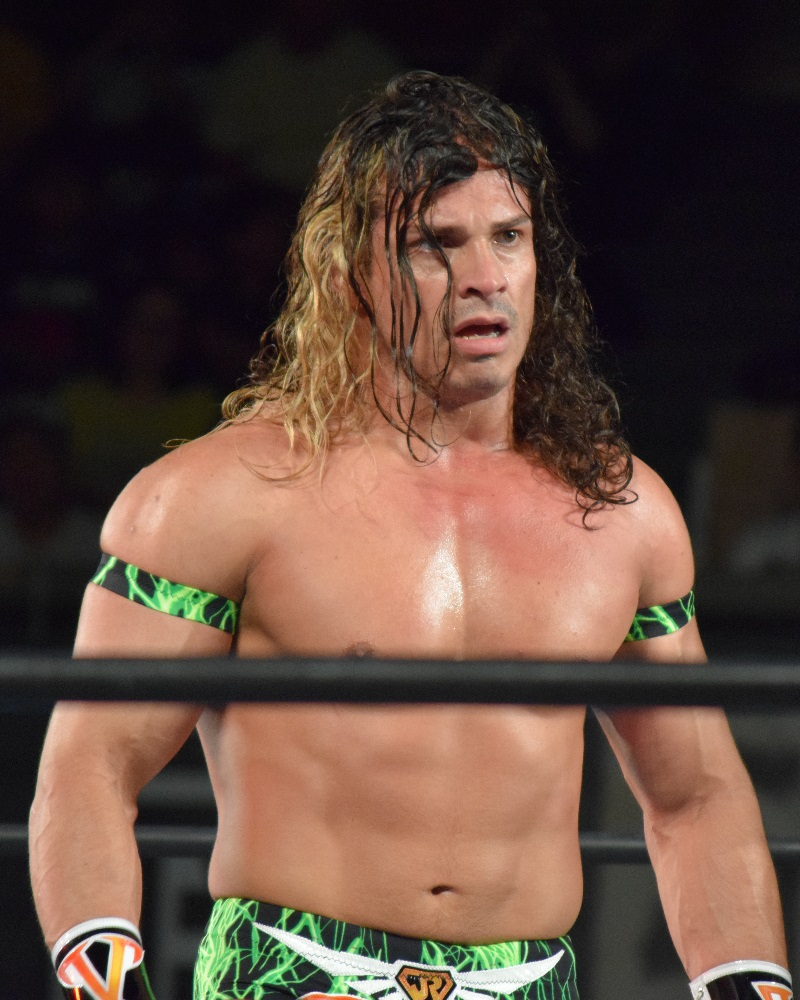
Volador Jr.

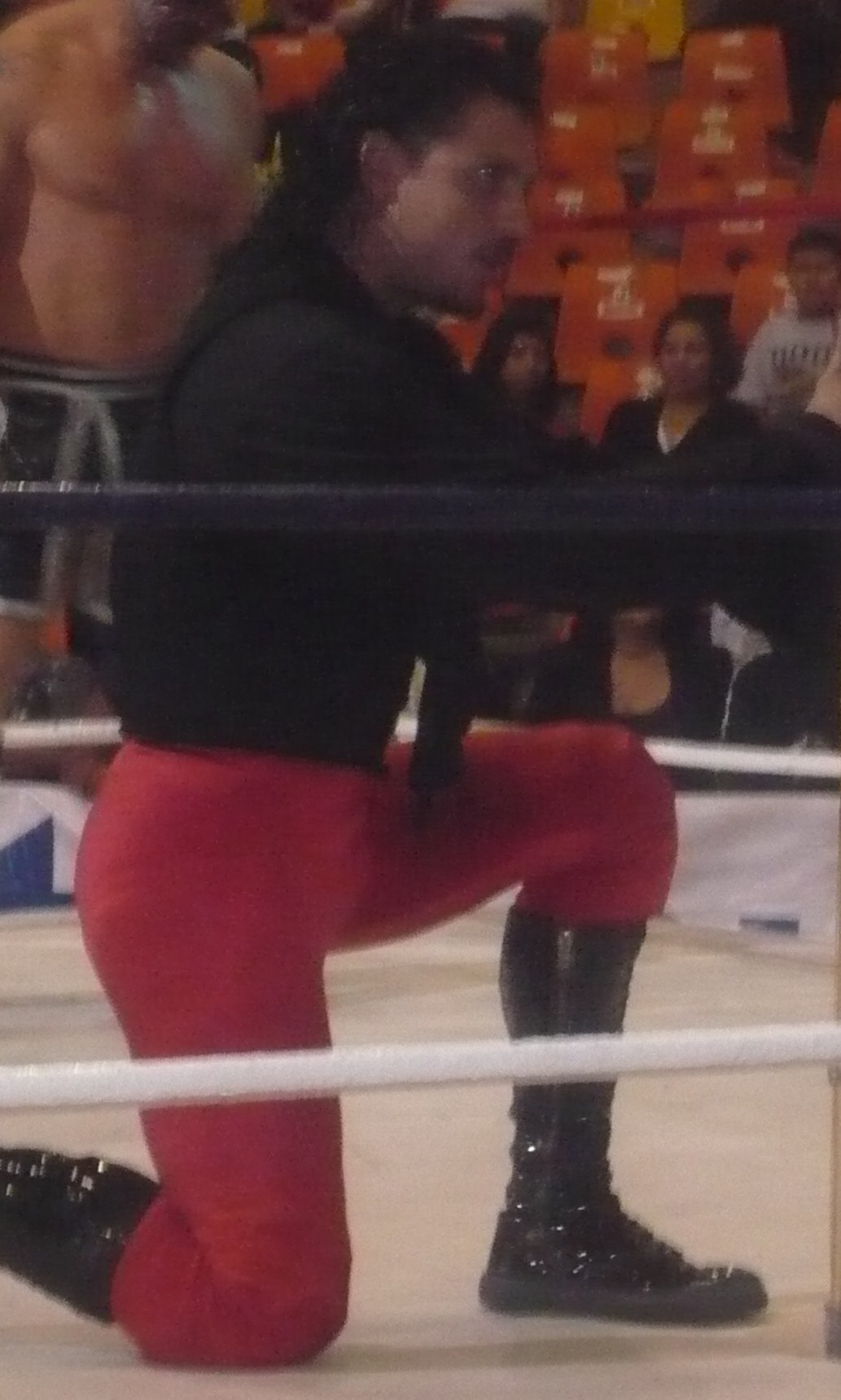
El Zorro

Birth name:^{[a]}	Ring name(s):	Tenure:	Notes
Andrés Alejandro Palomeque González	Abismo Negro	1997	
Unknown	Agente	1998	
Unknown	Aladino	1998	
Unknown	Alan Stone	1997–1998	
Unknown	Alas de Fuego	1997	
Ron Rivera	American Wild Child	1997	
Unknown	Andy Barrow	1996–1998	
Juan Manuel Zúñiga^{†}	Ángel Azteca	1996–1997	
David Camarena	Ángel Blanco Jr.	1996	
Unknown	Ángel de los Niños	1998	
Unknown	Angelito Azteca / Super Muñequito	1996; 1998	
Unknown	Animaniac	1998	
Unknown	Antifaz del Norte	1996–1998	
José Muñoz	Apolo Dantés	1997–1998	
Unknown	Apolo Star	1997	
Andrés González	La Araña Negra	1997	
Unknown	Arandú	1998	
Unknown	Arlequín	1998	
Unknown	Aspid	1997	
Unknown	Atlantis	1997–1998	
Unknown	Atomico Ramirez	1998	
Unknown	Ave de Fuego	1996	
Unknown	Azteca Imperial	1998	
Unknown	Bad Boy	1997	
Unknown	Bala	1997	
Raúl Gutiérrez	Barba Negra / Robotman	1997–1998	
Unknown^{†}	Barón Siniestro	1997	
Juan Manuel Rodriguez^{†}	Bestia Salvaje	1997–1998	
Unknown	Black Dragon	1997–1998	
Unknown	Black Jaguar	1996	
Norman Smiley	Black Magic	1997–1998	
Unknown	Black Maravilla	1997	
Juan Alanís	Black Shadow Jr.	1997	
Unknown	Black Shury	1997	
Unknown	Black Templar	1998	
Unknown	Black Templar Jr.	1998	
Jesus Toral López	Black Warrior / Black Panther	1996–1998	
Jeremiah Ross	Blitzkrieg	1997^{WCW}	
Genaro Nevarez	Blue Panther	1996–1997	
Juan Alvarado Nieves^{†}	El Brazo	1996–1998	
José Aarón Alvarado Nieves^{†}	Brazo Cibernético	1996–1998	
José Alvarado Nieves	Brazo de Plata	1996–1998	
Daniel Alvarado Nieves	Brazo de Platino	1998	
Unknown	Break Demon	1997	
Unknown	Bufalo	1998	
Unknown	Bufalo Azteca	1998	
Unknown	Bufalo Salvaje	1997	
Unknown	Caballero Águila	1996–1997	
Unknown	Caramelo	1998	
Unknown	Carinoso	1998	
Unknown	Carta Brava Jr.	1998	
Unknown	Catemoco	1997	
Unknown	Centella Verde	1998	
Unknown	Centella Verde Jr.	1997–1998	
Unknown	Chacal Ruiz	1997	
Manuel Ortiz Partida	Ciclope / Halloween	1996–1998	
Carmelo Reyes González	Cien Caras	1996–1998	
Unknown	Cirio	1998	
Unknown	Clímax	1998	
Unknown	El Cobarde	1997	
Gabriel Hernández	La Cobra	1996–1997	
José Luís Romero	Colt	1996–1998	
Unknown	Colt Master	1997	
Unknown	Comando I	1997	
Unknown	Comando II	1997	
Unknown	Crazy Boy	1997	
Unknown	Crazzy Man	1997–1998	
Roberto Fernández Barrón	Cyborg	1996–1997	
Leonardo Carrera Gómez	Damián 666	1996–1998	
Unknown	Damián el Guerrero	1997	
Roberto Gutiérrez Frías	El Dandy	1997–1998	
Unknown	Delfin Plateado	1998	
Unknown	El Demente	1997	
Unknown	Depredador	1996	
Unknown	Diamante de Oro	1997–1998	
Unknown	El Divino	1998	
José Arellano	Dos Caras	1996	
Alejandro Jiménez Cruz	Dr. Cerebro	1997	
Juan Manuel González Barrón	Dr. Wagner Jr.	1996–1998	
Unknown	Dragon de Oro	1996	
Unknown	El Duende	1998	
Unknown	Duende I	1998	
Unknown	Duende II	1998	
Unknown	Duende III	1998	
Sergio Garduño^{†}	Emilio Charles Jr.	1996–1998	
Unknown	Enemigo Público	1997	
Unknown	El Enfermero Jr.	1996	
Unknown	Enigma de Plata	1998	
Enrique Vera Rodríguez	Enrique Vera	1996–1997	
Unknown	Enterrador de la Muerte	1998	
Mario Pérez Jiménez^{†}	Espectrito	1997–1998	
Unknown	Espia Jr.	1997	
Unknown	Espíritu Guerrero	1998	
Unknown	Estrella de Fuego	1998	
Unknown	Estrella Dorada	1998	
Unknown	Extrano	1998	
Juan José Hernández Ornelas	El Fantasma	1996–1997	
Edmundo Ibaes Salas	Fantasma de la Quebrada	1998	
Unknown	Fantasy	1997	
Unknown	Fantomas	1997–1998	
Jorge Luis Casas Ruiz	Felino	1997–1998	
Unknown	Felino Salvaje	1997	
Unknown	El Fierito	1996	
Unknown	Filoso	1996	
José Ángel Nájera Sánchez	Fishman	1998	
Unknown	Flash Tiger	1997	
Felipe Castellanos	Fobia	1996	
Unknown	Forajido	1997	
Unknown	Fuego	1998	
Unknown	Fuego 2000	1997	
Unknown	Fuerza Guerrera	1996; 1998	
Unknown	El Fugitivo	1998	
Unknown^{†}	Furia Guerrera	1996	
Unknown	Gakic	1996	
Unknown	Galaxia R-2	1998	
Unknown	El Galgo	1996	
Unknown	Gallo Astral	1998	
Alejandro Alcala	Gallo Boy Z	1998	
Unknown	Gallo Galactico	1998	
Unknown	Gambito	1997–1998	
Unknown	Gavilan Martinez	1998	
Unknown	Genaro Contreras	1997	
Unknown	Geo	1997	
Miguel Ángel Guzmán Velázquez	El Gitano	1996–1997	
Unknown	Goku	1996–1997	
Unknown	Gran Genio	1998	
Unknown	Gran Guerrero	1998	
Unknown	Gran Misterio	1997–1998	
Unknown	Gringuito	1998	
Ricardo Gonzalez	Guerra C-3	1998	
Unknown	Guerrero de la Noche	1998	
Jorge Luis Herrera	Halcon Negro Jr.	1997–1998	
Victor Santiago	Headhunter A	1997–1998	
Manuel Santiago	Headhunter B	1997–1998	
Héctor Solano Segura^{†}	Héctor Garza	1997–1998	
Juan Carlos Gonzales	El Hijo del Diablo	1997–1998	
Unknown	El Hijo de Huracán Ramírez	1996–1998	
Jorge Guzmán	El Hijo del Santo	1996–1998	
Unknown	Hipnosis	1997	
Daniel García Arteaga	Huracán Ramírez	1996–1997	
Unknown	Huracán Ramírez Jr.	1996–1998	
Unknown	Indio Nakoma	1997–1998	
Luz Lorena Velarde Murillo	La Infernal	1997	
Unknown	Infierno Man	1997	
Gerardo Hernández Estrada	Jerry Estrada	1997–1998	
Unknown	El Jibarito	1997	
Unknown	Jinete de la Muerte	1998	
Unknown	Jinete Magico	1997–1998	
Shinchiro Yoshida	Jiraiya	1996–1997	
Unknown	Joe Rivera	1998	
Unknown	Juan Barrio	1998	
Takahiro Suwa	Judo Suwa	1997	
Unknown	Junior Kiss	1997–1998	
Felipe Flores Zamora	Jurassico	1996–1998	
Unknown	Jungla	1996–1997	
Eduardo Aníbal González Hernández	Juventud Guerrera	1996–1998	
Unknown	Kamikaze	1996–1997	
César Baltazar de Lucio Valencia	Karloff Lagarde Jr.	1997	
Johnny Lezcano Smith^{†}	Kato Kung Lee	1997	
Unknown	Kevin Quinn	1997	
Unknown	Killer	1997	
Unknown	King Lover	1998	
Manuel de los Santos	The Kiss	1997–1998	
Charles Ashenoff	Konnan	1996–1998	
Javier Arturo García	Ku Klux Klan #1	1997	
Arturo Casco Hernández^{†}	La Fiera	1997–1998	
Adolfo Tapia Ibarra	La Parka	1996–1998	
Jesús Alfonso Huerta Escoboza	La Parka Jr.	1997–1998	
Victor Manuel Resendiz Ruiz	Latin Lover	1997	
Unknown	León Dorado	1998	
Juan Baños^{†}	Lizmark	1997–1998	
Juan Carlos Baños	Lizmark Jr.	1997–1998	
Unknown	Lobo Rubio	1997	
Unknown	Lobo Vikingo	1998	
Katsumi Kanai	Lyguila	1996–1997	
Blas Columba	Lynx / Violencia	1996–1998	
Unknown	Macana	1998	
Unknown	El Macho	1998	
Unknown	Mágico	1998	
Katsumasa Kuroki	Magnum Tokyo	1997	
Unknown	Maguito Fantasma	1997	
Pedro Olveda González	Makabre	1998	
Unknown^{†}	Mandingo	1996	
Felipe Rojas Elizalde	Maniacop	1998	
Jesús Reyes González	Máscara Año 2000	1996–1997	
Antonio Gómez Medina	Máscara Mágica	1997	
Unknown	Máscara Sagrada	1996–1998	
Unknown	Máscara Sagrada Jr.	1997	
Unknown	Maverik	1998	
José Torres Santiago	Mazambula	1997	
Mario Fuentes	Médico Asesino Jr.	1997	
Gerardo Campos Poza	Mega	1998	
Unknown	Mega Elektra	1998	
Aaron Rodríguez	Mil Máscaras	1997–1998	
Roberto Castillo	Misterioso	1996–1997	
José de Jesús Pantoja Flores	Mogur	1998	
Unknown	El Mohicano / Mohicano I	1997	
Unknown	Monje Chino	1998	
Juan Valdez Valentino	Mosco de la Merced	1997–1998	
Unknown	Motocross	1997–1998	
Unknown	Mozambique	1996	
José Delgado Saldaña	Mr. Águila	1997–1998	
Unknown	Mr. Crimen / Mr. Krimen	1998	
Unknown	Mr. Niebla	1996–1998	
Unknown	Mr. Tempest	1998	
Unknown	Muneca Oriental	1997	
Unknown	Murciélago Infernal	1997	
Unknown	Neblina	1997	
José Casas Ruiz	Negro Casas	1997–1998	
Unknown	Neo	1997	
Ezequiel Antonio Rivera	Ninja de Fuego	1996–1997	
Unknown	Nygma	1996–1997	
Joel Bernal Galicia	Olímpico	1997–1998	
Unknown	Operativo	1998	
Noé Astro Moreno León	El Oriental	1997–1998	
Miguel Ángel Nava	Orito / Oro Jr.	1997–1998	
Unknown	Oso Vikingo	1998	
Unknown	Pachuco	1996–1997	
Unknown	Pachulli Van	1997	
Unknown	Pancho Robles Jr.	1997	
Unknown	Pandillero #1	1996–1997	
Unknown	Pandillero #2	1996–1997	
Luis Abelardo Hernández Cruz	El Pandita	1998	
Francisco Javier Pozas	El Pantera / América	1996–1998	
Unknown	Pantera del Ring	1996–1998	
Unknown	Pantera Gris	1998	
Unknown	Payasito I	1996–1997	
Unknown	Payasito II	1997	
José Ramírez	Pepe Aguayo	1997	
Unknown	Pepe Pueblo	1998	
Norberto Salgado Salcedo	Pierroth Jr.	1997–1998	
Unknown	Piloto Suicida	1998	
Pedro Ortiz Villanueva	Pirata Morgan / Violencia	1996–1998	
Daniel Núñez Hernández	El Potro	1997	
Salvador Quintana	Potro Salvaje	1998	
Dionisio Castellanos Torres	Psicosis	1996–1998	
Unknown	Rayde	1997–1998	
Unknown	Rayo de Jalisco Jr.	1996–1998	
Jesús González Monroy	El Rayo Tapatío I	1996–1997	
Víctor Manuel González Monroy	El Rayo Tapatío II	1996–1997	
Renato Cortes	Rencor Latino	1998	
Arturo García Ortiz	Rey Bucanero	1997–1998	
Miguel Ángel López Díaz	Rey Misterio	1996–1998	
Óscar Gutiérrez Rubio	Rey Misterio Jr.	1996–1997	
Julio Islas Rueda	Rey Pantera	1997	
Unknown	Rey Vikingo	1997–1998	
Unknown	El Rayo Tapatio I	1996–1997	
Unknown	El Rayo Tapatio II	1996–1997	
Aldo Ortiz	Ricky Santana	1998	
Jesús Reza García^{†}	Robot R-2	1998	
Victor Manuel Vargas Abreu	Rocky Santana	1996–1997	
Rudy Valentino	Rudy Valentino	1997	
Unknown	Sable	1997	
Unknown	El Sagrado	1998	
Rafael Herbert Reyes	El Salsero	1996–1998	
Daniel López	El Satánico	1996; 1998	
Unknown	Scandalo	1996–1997	
Rafael Núñez Juan	Scorpio Jr.	1997–1998	
Unknown	Sendero	1997	
Unknown	Sergio Romo Jr.	1996–1997	
Unknown	La Serpiente Rockera	1997–1998	
Unknown	Shamu	1996; 1998	
Nobuhiko Oshima	Shiima Nobunaga	1997	
Kazuhiro Hayashi	Shiryu	1997–1998	
José Luis Jair Soria	Shocker	1996–1998	
Unknown	Shu el Guerrero	1996–1997	
Unknown	Shurican / Shuriken	1997–1998	
Antonio Sánchez Rendón	El Signo	1996	
César Cuauhtémoc González Barrón	Silver King	1997–1998	
Jorge Rivera Serrano	Skayde / Elektra	1996–1998	
Unknown	Solar #1 / El Mariachi	1996–1997	
Pedro Buenrostro Torres	Solar #2	1996	
Unknown	Sparks	1998	
Unknown	Spawn	1998	
Othoniel Trejo	Starman	1998	
Sean Morley	El Steele	1997	
Unknown	Stranger	1997	
Unknown	Streep	1997	
Unknown	Sueño Chicano	1996; 1998	
Unknown	Sumatra	1998	
Tatsuki Fuji	Sumo Fuji	1997	
Unknown	Super Aladino	1998	
Juan Zezatti Ramírez	Super Astro	1997–1998	
Unknown	Super Black	1997–1998	
Rafael García Sánchez	Super Caló	1996–1998	
Francisco Pantoja Islas	Super Crazy	1997–1998	
Daniel Lyon	Super Dragon	1997	
Jorge Vega Oriel	Super Elektra	1996–1998	
Unknown	Super Muñeco	1997–1998	
Ramón Ibarra Banda	Super Parka	1997–1998	
Unknown	Super Pinocho	1998	
Unknown	Super Ratón	1998	
Yoshihiro Tajiri	Tajiri	1998	
Oziel Toscano Jasso	Tarzan Boy	1996–1998	
Unknown	Taurus	1997	
Unknown	Tawa	1997	
Juan Jáuregui^{†}	El Texano	1997–1998	
Unknown	Thunderbird	1996	
Celso Reyes Daza	Tiburón	1996	
Unknown	Tigre Blanco	1997	
Unknown	Tinieblas Jr.	1997–1998	
Unknown	Tom Mix	1997	
Unknown	Tom Mix Jr.	1997	
Unknown	Tony Boy	1998	
Antonio Cirio Flores	Tony Cirio	1997	
Javier Espinosa Romero	Tony Rivera	1997–1998	
Jose Allon	El Torero	1997–1998	
Unknown	Tornado Negro	1998	
Unknown	Tramposito	1998	
Unknown	Turok	1998	
Edgar Luna Pozos	Ultimatum	1996	
Unknown	Ultimo Gitano	1997	
José Gutiérrez Hernández	Último Guerrero	1996–1998	
Jesús Parra Ramírez	Último Rebelde / Súper Punk	1996–1998	
Andrés Reyes González	Universo 2000	1996–1998	
Ian Hodgkinson	Vampiro / Vampiro Canadiense	1996–1998	
Juan Miguel Escalante Grande	Vaquerito	1997	
Unknown	Vato Loco I	1997	
Unknown	Vato Loco II	1997	
Jullián Carrillo	Venum Black	1997–1998	
Unknown	Viajero del Futuro	1998	
Arturo Díaz Mendoza	Villano III	1997–1998	
Tomas Díaz Mendoza	Villano IV	1997–1998	
Raymundo Díaz Mendoza Jr.	Villano V	1997–1998	
Jesús Luna Pozos	Virtual	1997	
Unknown	Viper	1997	
Ricardo Carreño	Virus / Damiancito El Guerrero	1997–1998	
Ramón Ibarra Rivera	Volador Jr.	1998	
Unknown	Wolf	1996	
Unknown	Wolverine	1997–1998	
Ulises Ángel	X-Man	1998	
Unknown	Zafirito	1997	
Ismael Reyes Ham	Zapatista	1996–1997	
Jesús Cristóbal Martínez Rodríguez	El Zorro	1996–1998	
José Paz	Zumbido	1998	
Unknown	Zurikan	1998	

=== Female wrestlers ===
Birth name:^{[a]}	Ring name(s):	Tenure:	Notes
Guadalupe Olvera	La Amapola	1998	
María Cristina Valle Flores	La Chola	1996; 1998	
Unknown	La Diabólica	1997–1998	
Unknown	Flor Metálica	1997–1998	
Unknown	Galilea	1998	
Irma Eugenia Águilar Morales	Irma Águilar	1997	
Irma Morales Muñoz	Irma González	1996	
Sandra González Calderón	Lady Apache	1997–1998	
Unknown	Lady Connors	1997	
María Dolores González	Lola González	1996	
Unknown	La Mohicana	1997–1998	
Blanca Rodríguez	Princesa Blanca	1997–1998	
Unknown	Princesa Zareth	1997	
Dolores Hernández	La Rebelde	1996	
Héctor Navarro	La Sombra	1998	
Tania de Lourdes Díaz Alvarez	Tania	1996; 1998	

=== Mini-Estrella wrestlers ===
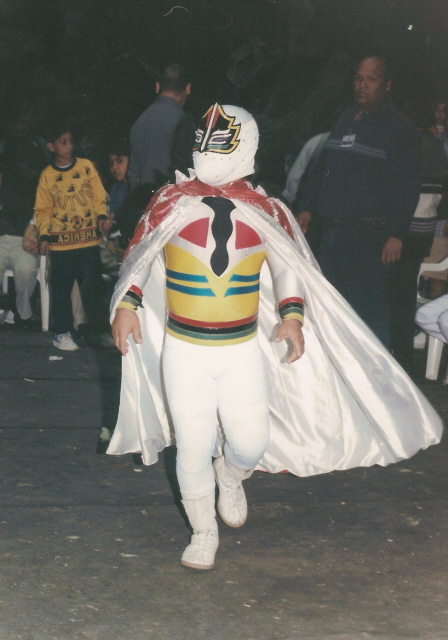
Mascarita Sagrada

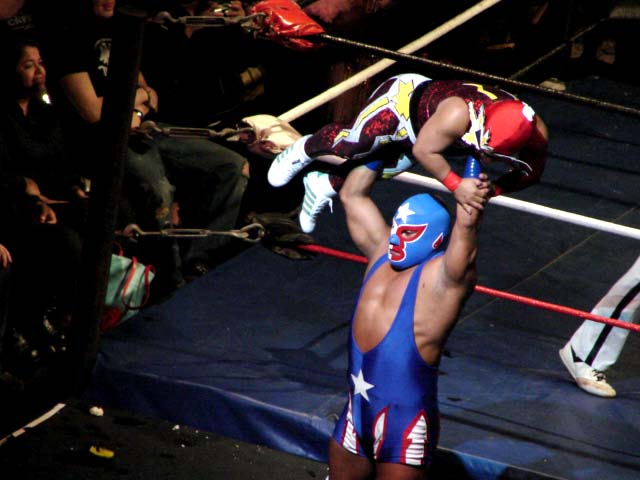
Pierrothito and Tzuki

Birth name:^{[a]}	Ring name(s):	Tenure:	Notes
Bracito de Oro	1996–1997		
Unknown	Bracito de Plata	1996	
Unknown	Dragoncito de Oro	1996–1997	
Alejandro Pérez Jiménez	Espectrito II / Guerrerito del Futuro	1996; 1998	
Unknown	Fuercita Guerrera	1996	
Enrique Del Rio	Jerrito Estrada	1996–1998	
Vicente Serrano	Mascarita Mágica	1998	
Domingo Fuentes Daniel	Mascarita Sagrada	1996–1998	
Unknown	Mini Andy Barrow	1997	
Unknown	Mini Elektra / King Flashito	1996–1998	
Unknown	Mini Konnan	1997–1998	
Unknown	Mini Rey Misterio Jr.	1997–1998	
Unknown	Mini Star	1998	
Unknown	Mini Super Calo	1997–1998	
Unknown	Octagoncito / Panterita	1996–1998	
Rolando Fuentes Romero	Pequeño Cochisse	1997	
Unknown	Pierrothito	1997–1998	
Raymundo Rodríguez	Piratita Morgan	1996–1998	
Unknown	Último Dragoncito	1997	

=== Stables and tag teams ===
Tag team/Stable(s)	Members	Tenure(s)
Los Bravos	Fuerza Guerrera and Juventud Guerrera	1996
Los Comandos	Comando I and Comando II	1997
The Headhunters	Headhunter A and Headhunter B	1997–1998
Los Hermanos Dinamita	Cien Caras, Máscara Año 2000 and Universo 2000	1996–1997
Los Hooligans	Último Guerrero and Último Rebelde	1996–1997
Los Kamikazes	Goku, Jiraiya and Lyguila	1997
Los Nuevos Brazos	Brazo Cibernético, Brazo de Platino and El Brazo	1998
Los Pandilleros	Pandillero #1, Pandillero #2 and Pandillero #3	1996–1997
Los Payasitos	Payasito I and Payasito II	1996–1997
New World Order	Konnan, Damián 666, Halloween, Psicosis, Villano IV and Villano V	1997
Los Rayos Tapatios	El Rayo Tapatio I and El Rayo Tapatio II	1996–1997
Los Vatos Locos	Vato Loco I and Vato Loco II	1997
Los Villanos	Villano III, Villano IV and Villano V	1997–1998

=== Managers and valets ===
Birth name:	Ring name(s):	Tenure:	Notes
Victoria Ann Moreno	Lady Victoria	1998	

=== Other personnel ===
Birth name:	Ring name(s):	Tenure:	Notes
Unknown	Fuerza Guerrera	1995–1996	Promoter
Charles Ashenoff	Konnan	1996–1998	Promoter; Booker
Jorge Rojas	Jorge Rojas	1996–1998	Promoter
Víctor Quiñones	Víctor Quiñones	1997	

Company name to Year
Company name:	Years:
Promotora Mexicana de Lucha Libre	1995–1996
Promo Azteca	1996–1998
Notes
^{†} Indicates they are deceased.
^{‡} Indicates they died while they were employed with Promo Azteca.
^{WCW} Indicates they were part of a talent exchange with World Championship Wrestling.

== Footnotes ==
- ^{a} – Entries without a birth name may indicate it is not a matter of public record, as is often the case with masked wrestlers in Mexico where their private lives are kept a secret from the wrestling fans.

== Championships and programming ==
=== Championships ===
Promo Azteca promoted championships

Championship	Champion	Notes
Promo Azteca Heavyweight Championship	Pirata Morgan	The heavyweight title of Promo Azteca. It was established in 1998 and was defended through the year. Pirata Morgan was the only champion
Promo Azteca Middleweight Championship	Pantera	The secondary title of Promo Azteca. It was established in 1997 and was defended through the year. Pantera was the only champion

Championships recognized by Promo Azteca

Championship	Champion	Notes
IWC World Heavyweight Championship	La Parka	The heavyweight title of the International Wrestling Council. It was defended in the promotion from 1997 to 1998.
IWRG Intercontinental Middleweight Championship	Pantera	A secondary title of the International Wrestling Revolution Group. It was defended in the promotion during 1997.
LAWA Middleweight Championship	Super Caló	A secondary title of the Latin American Wrestling Association. It was defended in the promotion during 1997.
Mexican National Lightweight Championship	Virus	The lightweight title of Consejo Mundial de Lucha Libre. It was defended in the promotion during 1998.
Mexican National Welterweight Championship	El Torero	The welterweight title of AAA. It was defended in the promotion during 1997.
WWO Heavyweight Championship	Tinieblas Jr.	The heavyweight title of the World Wrestling Organization. It defended in the promotion during 1997.

=== Programming ===
Programming	Notes
Promo Azteca TV	(1996–1998) Broadcast exclusively on TV Azteca.

== See also ==
- List of professional wrestling promotions in Mexico
