= Triplemanía V-B =

1997 Lucha Libre AAA World Wide event

- Logo of Triplemanía V from the television broadcast
- Promotion: AAA
- Date: June 15, 1997
- City: Naucalpan, Mexico
- Venue: El Toreo

Pay-per-view chronology
← Previous; Triplemanía V-A	Next → Verano de Escándalo

Triplemanía chronology
← Previous; V-A	Next → VI

Triplemanía V-B was the second part of the fifth Triplemanía professional wrestling show promoted by AAA. 1997 was fourth year to feature the "Triplemanía Series" of shows with two, referred to as V-A and V-B, where this was the second and final of the series. The show took place on June 15, 1997 in Naulcalpan, Mexico. The main event featured an eight-man "Atómicos" tag-team match between the teams of Perro Aguayo, Octagón, Cibernético and El Canek and Jake Roberts, Gorgeous George III, El Cobarde Jr. and Fuerza Guerrera.

== Production ==
=== Background ===
In early 1992 Antonio Peña was working as a booker and storyline writer for Consejo Mundial de Lucha Libre (CMLL), Mexico's largest and the world's oldest wrestling promotion, and was frustrated by CMLL's very conservative approach to professional wrestling, specifically the style of wrestling known as Lucha Libre (Spanish for "freestyle wrestling"). He joined forced with a number of younger, very talented wrestlers who felt like CMLL was not giving them the recognition they deserved and decided to split from CMLL to create Asistencia Asesoría y Administración, later known simply as "AAA" or Triple A. After making a deal with the Televisa television network AAA held their first show in April 1992. The following year Peña and AAA held their first Triplemanía event, building it into an annual event that would become AAA's Super Bowl event, similar to the WWE's WrestleMania being the biggest show of the year. The 1997 Triplemanía was the fifth year in a row AAA held a Triplemanía show and the twelfth overall show under the Triplemanía banner.

=== Storylines ===
The Triplemanía V-B show featured eight professional wrestling matches with different wrestlers involved in pre-existing scripted feuds, plots and storylines. Wrestlers were portrayed as either heels (referred to as rudos in Mexico, those that portray the "bad guys") or faces (técnicos in Mexico, the "good guy" characters) as they followed a series of tension-building events, which culminated in a wrestling match or series of matches.

== Results ==
No.	Results	Stipulations
1	Octagoncito, Chivito Rayada, and Mini Cibernetico defeated Pentagóncito, Mini Mankind, and Mini Goldust	Six-man "Lucha Libre rules" tag team match
2	Los Vipers (Histeria, Maniaco and Mosco de la Merced) defeated Venum and Las Chivas Rayadas (Chivas Rayadas I and Chivas Rayadas II) by disqualification	Six-man "Lucha Libre rules" tag team match
3	Abismo Negro, Kraneo, Perro Aguayo Jr., and El Mexicano defeated El Picudo, May Flowers, Crazy 33, and Hijo del Espectro	Eight-man "Atómicos" tag team match
4	Blue Demon Jr., Tinieblas and Tinieblas Jr. defeated Pentagón, Scarecrow, and Killer	Six-man "Lucha Libre rules" tag team match
5	Sangre Chicana defeated Heavy Metal by disqualification	Streetfight
6	Los Payasos (Coco Rojo, Coco Verde and Coco Amarillo) defeated Máscara Sagrada Jr., La Calaca, and Super Muñeco; La Calaca was the last man in the cage and was forced to unmask.	Steel Cage Match Lucha de Apuestas "Mask vs. Mask"
7	Latin Lover defeated Pierroth Jr.	Singles match
8	Perro Aguayo, Octagón, Cibernético and Canek defeated Jake Roberts, Gorgeous George III, El Cobarde Jr. and Fuerza Guerrera	Eight-man "Atómicos" tag team match
