= Triplemanía V-A =

1997 Lucha Libre AAA World Wide event

- Logo of Triplemanía V from the television broadcast
- Promotion: AAA
- Date: June 13, 1997
- City: Tijuana, Baja California, Mexico
- Venue: Plaza de Toros
- Attendance: 6,000

Pay-per-view chronology
← Previous; Rey de Reyes	Next → Triplemanía V-B

Triplemanía chronology
← Previous; IV-C	Next → V-B

Triplemanía V-A was the first part of the fifth Triplemanía professional wrestling show promoted by AAA. 1997 was fourth year to feature the "Triplemanía Series" of shows with two, referred to as V-A and V-B, where this was the first of the series. The show took place on June 13, 1997 in Tijuana, Mexico. The Main event featured a Six-man "Lucha Libre rules" tag team match between the teams of Perro Aguayo, Tinieblas Jr. and Canek and Jake Roberts, Killer, and Gorgeous George III.

== Production ==
=== Background ===
In early 1992 Antonio Peña was working as a booker and storyline writer for Consejo Mundial de Lucha Libre (CMLL), Mexico's largest and the world's oldest wrestling promotion, and was frustrated by CMLL's very conservative approach to professional wrestling, specifically the style of wrestling known as Lucha Libre (Spanish for "freestyle wrestling"). He joined forced with a number of younger, very talented wrestlers who felt like CMLL was not giving them the recognition they deserved and decided to split from CMLL to create Asistencia Asesoría y Administración, later known simply as "AAA" or Triple A. After making a deal with the Televisa television network AAA held their first show in April, 1992. The following year Peña and AAA held their first Triplemanía event, building it into an annual event that would become AAA's Super Bowl event, similar to the WWE's WrestleMania being the biggest show of the year. The 1997 Triplemanía was the fifth year in a row AAA held a Triplemanía show and the eleventh overall show under the Triplemanía banner.

=== Storylines ===
The Triplemanía V-A show featured eight professional wrestling matches with different wrestlers involved in pre-existing scripted feuds, plots and storylines. Wrestlers were portrayed as either heels (referred to as rudos in Mexico, those that portray the "bad guys") or faces (técnicos in Mexico, the "good guy" characters) as they followed a series of tension-building events, which culminated in a wrestling match or series of matches.

== Results ==
No.	Results	Stipulations
1	Firebird, Forastero, and Black Silver defeated Depredator, Syndrome, and Caligula	Best two-out-of-three falls six-man "Lucha Libre rules" tag team match
2	Los Cadetes Del Espacio (Venum, Ludxor, Discovery and Super Nova) defeated Los Hampones (Frank Nitti, Al Capone and Goyo) and Loco Valentino	Best two-out-of-three falls eight-man "Atómicos" tag team match
3	La Parkita, Octagoncito, and Mini Cibernético defeated Mini Goldust, Mini Mankind, and Pentagoncito	Best two-out-of-three falls six-man "Lucha Libre rules" tag team match
4	Pentagón, Fuerza Guerrera, and Sangre Chicana defeated Octagón, Máscara Sagrada, Jr. and Aarandu	Best two-out-of-three falls six-man "Lucha Libre rules" tag team match
5	Rey Misterio Jr. defeated Juventud Guerrera	Singles match
6	Cibernético defeated Pierroth Jr.	Streetfight
7	Heavy Metal and Leon Negro defeated the teams of Latin Lover and Perro Aguayo Jr., Jerry Estrada and El Picudo and May Flowers and Halcón Dorado Jr. (Leon Negro pinned Halcón Dorado, Jr.)	Best two-out-of-three falls Lucha de Apuestas "Hair vs. Hair" match
8	Perro Aguayo, Tinieblas Jr. and Canek defeated Jake Roberts, Killer, and Gorgeous George III	Six-man "Lucha Libre rules" tag team match: Fall One: Jake Roberts, Killer and Gorgeous George III were disqualified; Fall Two: Jake Roberts, Killer and Gorgeous George III were disqualified
