= Triplemanía VI =

1998 Lucha Libre AAA World Wide event

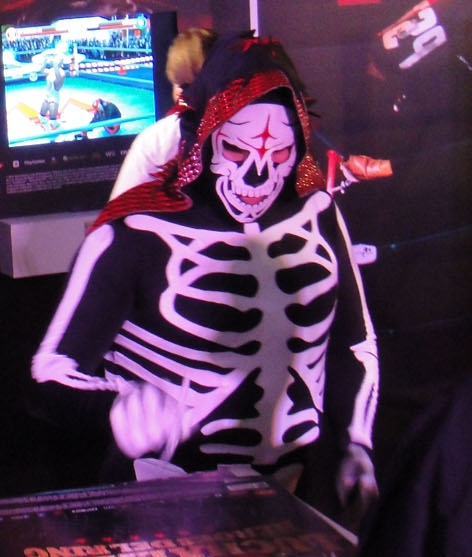
- La Parka Jr., was successful against Los Vipers in the third match of the night
- Promotion: AAA
- Date: June 7, 1998
- City: Chihuahua City, Chihuahua, Mexico
- Venue: Gymnasio Manual Bernardo Aguirre

Pay-per-view chronology
| ← Previous; Rey de Reyes | Next → Verano de Escándalo |

Triplemanía chronology
| ← Previous; V-B | Next → VII |

Triplemanía VI was the sixth Triplemanía professional wrestling show promoted by AAA. 1998 was the first year since 1993 to only feature one Triplemanía event. The show took place on June 7, 1998 at Gymnasio Manual Bernardo Aguirre in Chihuahua, Chihuahua, Mexico.

The Main event featured a singles match between Kick Boxer and Heavy Metal where each man represented an AAA referee who put his hair on the line. Heavy Metal represented his father Pepe Casas while Kick Boxer represented referee El Tirantes. The show also featured a match for the Mexican National Tag Team Championship as champions Juventud Guerrera and Mosco de la Merced defended the championship against the father/son team of Perro Aguayo and Perro Aguayo Jr. The show featured three additional matches.

== Production ==
=== Background ===
In early 1992 Antonio Peña was working as a booker and storyline writer for Consejo Mundial de Lucha Libre (CMLL), Mexico's largest and the world's oldest wrestling promotion, and was frustrated by CMLL's very conservative approach to professional wrestling, specifically the style of wrestling known as Lucha Libre (Spanish for "freestyle wrestling"). He joined forced with a number of younger, very talented wrestlers who felt like CMLL was not giving them recognition they deserved and decided to split from CMLL to create Asistencia Asesoría y Administración, later known simply as "AAA" or Triple A. After making a deal with the Televisa television network AAA held their first show in April, 1992. The following year Peña and AAA held their first Triplemanía event, building it into an annual event that would become AAA's Super Bowl event, similar to the WWE's WrestleMania being the biggest show of the year.

1998 marked the first year since 1993 where AAA decided to just hold one Triplemanía show instead of the series of shows they had held over the summers of 1994 to 1997 and from that point on has only held one Triplemanía show per year. The Triplemanía VI show was the 13th overall show held under the Triplemanía banner. The event would take place at the Gymnasio Manual Bernardo Aguirre arena in Chihuahua City, Chihuahua, Mexico, an indoor sports arena with a capacity of 7.904 people for basketball games, more when the floor section also features seating arrangements. A total of five matches were booked for the show, which outside of Triplemanía IV-A, which had four matches, is the lowest number of matches at a Triplemanía show tied with Triplemanía VIII which also only featured five matches.

=== Storylines ===
The Triplemanía VI show featured five professional wrestling matches with different wrestlers involved in pre-existing scripted feuds, plots and storylines. Wrestlers were portrayed as either heels (referred to as rudos in Mexico, those that portray the "bad guys") or faces (técnicos in Mexico, the "good guy" characters) as they followed a series of tension-building events, which culminated in a wrestling match or series of matches.

== Results ==
| No. | Results | Stipulations | Times |
|---|---|---|---|
| 1 | Venum and R-15 defeated Óscar Sevilla and Charly Manson | Parejas Increibles Tag team match | 01:53 |
| 2 | Pentagón, Octagón, and Octagoncito defeated Electroshock, Abismo Negro, and Mini Abismo Negro | Best two-out-of-three falls six-man "Lucha Libre rules" tag team match | — |
| 3 | Latin Lover, La Parka, Jr., Blue Demon Jr., and Máscara Sagráda (II) defeated Los Vipers (Histeria, Maniaco, Cibernético, and Psicosis II) by disqualification | Best two-out-of-three falls eight-man "Atómicos" tag team match | — |
| 4 | Perro Aguayo and Perro Aguayo Jr. defeated Fuerza Guerrera and Mosco de la Merced (c) | Best two-out-of-three falls tag team match for the Mexican National Tag Team Championship | — |
| 5 | Kick Boxer defeated Heavy Metal | Steel cage match, Lucha de Apuestas, "Hair of Pepe Casas vs. Hair of El Tirantes" match | — |
(c) / – the champion(s) heading into the match
