= Ángel Rebelde (wrestler) =

Mexican professional wrestler

Personal information
- Born: Unrevealed; April 25, 1997 (age 29) Querétaro City, Querétaro

Professional wrestling career
- Ring name: Ángel Rebelde
- Trained by: Mr. Rebelde; Dragon de Oriente II; Atomico; Mike Suicida; Rey Cometa
- Debut: April 25, 2010

Ángel Rebelde (born April 25, 1997, in Querétaro City, Querétaro) is a Mexican professional wrestler currently working for the Mexican promotion Consejo Mundial de Lucha Libre (CMLL), portraying a tecnico ("Good guy") wrestling character. His real name is not a matter of public record, as is often the case with masked wrestlers in Mexico where their private lives are kept a secret from the wrestling fans.

Ángel Rebelde is the son of Mister Rebelde, a locally famous Querétaro wrestler mostly active during the 1980s. His nickname is Líder de la Corte Celestial.

== Career ==
Ángel Rebelde performing an arm drag maneuver during a match in Arena Querétaro. March 2018.

Ángel Rebelde started his career in 2010, making his debut on his 13th birthday. He initially worked locally in Querétaro and Guanajuato state with promotions such as Generación 21, Promociones Tao and Desastre Total Ultraviolento. He also worked dark matches for Lucha Libre AAA Worldwide whenever they had shows in Querétaro.

On the 15th of October 2017, he won the Querétaro State Lightweight Title after defeating Fuego Latino and Mike Suicida. In 2018 he began a long lasting rivalry with fellow Querétaro local Último Soldado, which culminated with a mask vs. hair match on June 30, 2019, which Rebelde won. With time he moved up the cards in his local area but like most professional wrestlers struggled with work during 2020.

December 25, 2021, Angel Rebelde would return to Querétaro for the yearly Christmas Day show in Arena Querétaro, the largest arena in the area, where he defeated long time Querétaro wrestler Homicida in a mask vs. mask match.

=== Consejo Mundial de Lucha Libre (2022–) ===
In June 2021, after most COVID-19 pandemic related restrictions was loosened, he started working for Consejo Mundial de Lucha Libre in their Guadalajara branch, encouraged by his mentor and fellow Querétaro native Rey Cometa.

His first appearance in Mexico City for the promotion took place on June 24, 2022, when he participated in a multi-man elimination match for the then vacant Mexican National Welterweight Championship. On September 12, 2022, he would make his first appearance in Arena Puebla for CMLL, as part of a Guadalajara vs. Puebla concept show.

His definite move to Mexico City came when he was invited to participate for the Guadalajara team in CMLL's new Torneo de Escuelas tournament, where the CMLL trainees from Mexico City, Puebla, Guadalajara and Comarca Lagunera competed against each other in a series of multi-man matches. The tournament took place in March 2023. Ángel Rebelde and his Guadalajara team managed to defeat both the Puebla and Mexico City team on consecutive shows, and won the tournament. Since winning the tournament, Ángel Rebelde and a select few of the other participants has become a part of the CMLL roster. On April 1, 2023, he was one of the participants in a 2023 New Generation Tourney match as part of Arena Coliseo 80th anniversary.

== Championships and accomplishments ==
- Consejo Mundial de Lucha Libre
  - Torneo de Escuelas (2023 - with Explosivo, Crixus, Adrenalina, Fantastico, and Vaquero Jr.)
