= Águila Solitaria =

Mexican wrestler (born 1954)

Personal information
- Born: August 31, 1954 (age 72) Mexico

Professional wrestling career
- Ring name: Águila Solitaria
- Billed height: 1.75 m (5 ft 9 in)
- Billed weight: 90 kg (198 lb)
- Trained by: Hércules Flores; Tom Mix
- Debut: November 1978
- Retired: 2019

Águila Solitaria (born August 31, 1954) is a Mexican professional wrestler. Águila Solitaria's real name is not a matter of public record, as is often the case with masked wrestlers in Mexico where their private lives are kept a secret from the wrestling fans. His ring name, Águila Solitario, is Spanish for "Lone Eagle", which is reflected in the eagle wing design on his mask. Águila Soltaria made his professional wrestling debut in 1978 and since 1997 has only wrestled a limited schedule.

== Professional wrestling career ==
Águila Solitaria made his debut in 1978 after training under Hércules Flores and Tom Mix, adopting the winged black and silver mask that became his trademark in the following years. After working on the independent circuit for a couple of years he began working for Empresa Mexicana de Lucha Libre (EMLL) in 1980. While working for EMLL Águila Solitaria began bringing a live Eagle with him to the ring, having it perch on his arm until he stepped inside the ring and then often letting it fly free around the arena, sometimes with the result that the eagle would not return voluntarily. In 1981 Solitaria began making a name for himself by winning a string of Luchas de Apuestas (bet matches), winning the masks of at least six wrestlers in 1981 and at least two in 1982. On July 19, 1987, Águila Solitaria won his first singles championship when he defeated El Simbolo to win the Mexican National Welterweight Championship. Over the next 412 days Águila Solitaria defended the title several times, against wrestlers such as Bestia Salvaje. On September 3, 1988, Solitario lost the title to Bestia Salvaje. After losing the Mexican National title Águila Solitaria began chasing the NWA World Welterweight Championship, held by Fuerza Guerrera at the time. On June 2, 1989, Solitaria defeated Fuerza Guerrera to win the NWA World Welterweight Championship. Solitaria held the title for 111 days before Fuerza Guerrera regained the title on September 21, 1989. Following his NWA title loss Águila Solitaria began teaming with Ciclón Ramirez and Pantera to form a group known as Las Saetas del Ring (Spanish for "The Arrows of the Ring") Together Las Saetas won the Nuevo León State Trios Championship and the Veracruz State Trios Championship, before winning the Distrito Federal Trios Championship from Los Tarascos in 1991. La Saetas later lost the Mexico City Trios title to Los Metálicos (Oro, Plata and Bronce). When Consejo Mundial de Lucha Libre (CMLL; the new name for EMLL) started its Mini-Estrella division in 1991 Águila Solitario was given a mascota called Aguilita Soltaria, a Mini-Estrella who later became better known as "Super Muñequito". When Antonio Peña and a number of wrestlers left CMLL in 1992 for Peña's newly created Asistencia Asesoría y Administración (AAA) Águilta Solitaria remained loyal with CMLL, working for them on a regular basis until 1997 where he retired. Sometime in the early 2000s Águilita Solitaria returned to wrestling, working mainly on the independent circuit to this day.

== Championships and accomplishments ==
- Empresa Mexicana de Lucha Libre
  - Mexican National Welterweight Championship (1 time)
  - NWA World Welterweight Championship (1 time)
- State championships
  - Distrito Federal Trios Championship (1 time) – with El Pantera and Ciclón Ramírez
  - Mexico State Welterweight Championship (1 time)
  - Nuevo León State Trios Championship (1 time) – with El Pantera and Ciclón Ramírez
  - Veracruz State Trios Championship (1 time) – with El Pantera and Ciclón Ramírez

== Luchas de Apuestas record ==
Winner (wager)	Loser (wager)	Location	Event	Date	Notes
Águila Solitaria (mask)	Khadaffi (mask)	N/A	Live event	N/A	
Águila Solitaria (mask)	Cid Campeador (mask)	N/A	Live event	N/A	
Águila Solitaria (mask)	Eros (mask)	Mexico City	Live event	February 8, 1981	
Águila Solitaria (mask)	El Bastardo (mask)	Mexico City	Live event	March 21, 1981	
Águila Solitaria (mask)	Vulcano (mask)	Mexico City	Live event	May 3, 1981	
Águila Solitaria (mask)	Caballero Blanco (mask)	Mexico City	Live event	May 31, 1981	
Águila Solitaria (mask)	El Gladiador (II) (mask)	N/A	Live event	April 25, 1982	
Águila Solitaria (mask) and Franco Colombo (hair)	Cid Campeador (mask) and Ari Romero (hair)	Mexico City	Live event	June 19, 1982	
Águila Solitaria (mask)	El Cortado (mask)	Mexico City	Live event	September 8, 1994	
Águila Solitaria (mask)	Antifaz (mask)	Mexico City	Live event	September 29, 1994	
Águila Solitaria (mask)	Black Machine (mask)	Mexico City	Live event	April 27, 1995	
Águila Solitaria (mask)	Rock el Cavernicola (mask)	Mexico City	Live event	July 19, 1995	
Águila Solitaria (mask)	Morguilla 2000 (mask)	Acapulco, Guerrero	Live event	May 21, 2001	
