= Ciclón Ramirez =

Mexican professional wrestler (1961–2025)

Ciclón Ramírez
Personal information
- Born: Celso Reyes Daza; July 28, 1961 Acapulco, Guerrero, Mexico
- Died: March 4, 2025 (aged 63) Mexico City, Mexico

Professional wrestling career
- Ring names: Ovni; Pegaso I; Ciclón Ramírez; Mr. Ramírez; Tiburón
- Billed height: 1.70 m (5 ft 7 in)
- Billed weight: 81 kg (179 lb)
- Trained by: Diablo Velazco
- Debut: March 1982
- Retired: 2024

Celso Reyes Daza (July 28, 1961 – March 4, 2025) was a Mexican professional wrestler, best known under his ring name Ciclón Ramírez (Spanish for "Cyclone Ramirez"). Reyes worked as Pegaso I for six years before switching to the Ciclón Ramirez name in 1988. As Ramirez he originally worked as an masked wrestler but was unmasked after losing a Luchas de Apuestas, or bet fight, to El Felino. The character "Ciclón Ramirez" is billed as a relative of the character Huracán Ramírez, which is a storyline invented for wrestling. Reyes' son currently works as Ciclón Ramírez Jr.

== Professional wrestling career ==
Celso Reyes Daza began his professional wrestling career in 1982, initially working under the ring name Ovni, but soon changed his name to Pegasso I (Spanish for Pegasus I), an masked wrestler character based on the mythical Pegasus. Initially he teamed with Pegasso II, but the Pegasso team did not last long as Reyes struck out on his own as a singles wrestler. On March 17, 1985, Pegaso I defeated El Modulo to win the Mexican National Lightweight Championship, his first professional wrestling championship. Pegaso I held the title for 118 days before losing it to El Khalifa. Reyes continued to work as Pegaso I until 1988 where he assumed a new enmascarado identity, Ciclón Ramírez, a fictional brother of Huracán Ramírez, a legendary professional wrestler. Ciclón Ramírez defeated Bestia Salvaje in the final of a tournament to win the Mexican National Welterweight Championship on May 21, 1989. Ramírez held the title for 430 days, defending the title on several occasions before losing it to Canelo Casas on July 25, 1990, a full 430 days after winning it. Ramírez regained the Welterweight title from Canelo Casas on February 13, 1991.

In the early 1990s Ciclón Ramírez began teaming with Águila Solitaria and Pantera to form a group known as Las Saetas del Ring (Spanish for "The Arrows of the Ring"). Together Las Saetas won the Nuevo León State Trios Championship and the Veracruz State Trios Championship, before winning the Distrito Federal Trios Championship from Los Tarascos in 1991. Las Saetas later lost the Distrito Federal Trios title to Los Metalicos (Oro, Plata and Bronce). Ciclón Ramírez second run with the Mexican National Welterweight Title lasted for 508 days, ending on July 5, 1992, when he lost the title to El Felino. In August, 1992 Ramírez won a tournament for the vacant Mexican National Welterweight title after El Felino had vacated it. In the final Ciclón Ramírez defeated Fantasma de la Quebrada to win the Welterweight title for the third time. This third, and so far final run with the Welterweight title lasted only 45 days before he lost it to Fantasma de la Quebrada. After losing the Mexican National title Ciclón Ramírez began a storyline feud with El Felino, initially over the CMLL World Welterweight Championship that El Felino held and Ciclón Ramírez won, but moved beyond that as the two met in a Luchas de Apuestas (bet fight) where El Felino pinned Ciclón Ramírez to unmask him. The feud culminated when El Felino finally regained the title on March 30, 1994.

Following the culmination of the storyline with El Felino Ramírez left Consejo Mundial de Lucha Libre (CMLL) and began working on the Mexican independent circuit. He began teaming with two "storyline" cousins Nuevo Huracán Ramírez Jr. (New Huracán Ramírez Jr.) and El Hijo del Huracán Ramírez (the son of Huracán Ramírez) to win the Distrito Federal Trios title once more. The trio held the title until October 1995 where they lost to Los Destructores (Rocco Valente, Tony Arce and Vulcano). After the loss Reyes briefly worked as "Mr. Ramírez" and later on as Tiburón in Promo Azteca between 1996 and 1997. By the late 1990s Reyes returned to using the Ciclón Ramírez name, working for International Wrestling Revolution Group (IWRG) where he defeated Dr. Cerebro on June 29, 2000, to win the IWRG Intercontinental Welterweight Championship. Ramírez held the title for 45 days before Dr. Cerebro regained the title. Reyes helped train and promote his son who wrestles as "Ciclón Ramírez Jr." while still working on the Mexican independent circuit.

== Death ==
Ramirez died from a heart attack on March 4, 2025, at the age of 63.

== Championships and accomplishments ==
- Consejo Mundial de Lucha Libre
  - CMLL World Welterweight Championship (1 time)
  - Mexican National Lightweight Championship (1 time) – as Pegaso I
  - Mexican National Welterweight Championship (3 times)
- Comision de Box y Lucha Distrito Federal
  - Distrito Federal Welterweight Championship (1 time)
  - Distrito Federal Trios Championship (2 times) – with Hijo de Huracán Ramírez and Huracán Ramírez Jr., with Águila Solitaria and El Pantera
- International Wrestling Revolution Group
  - IWRG Intercontinental Welterweight Championship (1 time)
- Mexican Regional Championships
  - Arena Santa Maria Aztahuacán Tag Team Championship (1 time) – with SWAT
  - Naucalpan Middleweight Championship
  - Nuevo León Trios Championship (1 time) – with Águila Solitaria and El Pantera
  - Occident Welterweight Championship (1 time) – as Pegaso I
  - Veracruz Trios Championship (1 time) – with Águila Solitaria and El Pantera
- Lucha Libre Total
  - LLT Championship (1 Time)

== Luchas de Apuestas record ==
Winner (wager)	Loser (wager)	Location	Event	Date	Notes
Ciclón Ramírez (mask)	Dalia Negra (mask)	N/A	Live event	March 21, 1992	
Ciclón Ramírez (mask)	Rey Lobo (mask)	Celaya, Guanajuato	Live event	May 26, 1993	(Note: The match also included Platino.)
El Felino (mask)	Ciclón Ramírez (mask)	Mexico City	Live event	July 9, 1993	
Javier Cruz (hair)	Ciclón Ramírez (hair)	Mexico City	Live event	June 10, 1994	
Chicago Express (hair)	Ciclón Ramírez (hair)	Mexico City	Live event	June 13, 1995	
Karloff Lagarde Jr. (hair)	Ciclón Ramírez (hair)	Mexico City	Live event	March 17, 1996	
Ciclón Ramírez (hair)	Bombero Infernal (hair)	Naucalpan, State of Mexico	Live event	June 15, 2000	(Note: The match also included Dr. Cerebro.)
Ciclón Ramírez (hair)	El Mohicano I (hair)	Tlaxcala, Tlaxcala	Live event	July 17, 2005	
