= El Torero =

Mexican professional wrestler

Personal information
- Born: Jose Isaías Cancio Allon; July 6, 1959 (age 67)

Professional wrestling career
- Ring name(s): Atlantico; Bronco; El Torero
- Billed from: Tijuana, Baja California, Mexico
- Trained by: Chamaco Martínez; All Azteca
- Debut: September 1985
- Retired: February 3, 2005

Jose Isias Cancio Allon (born July 6, 1959) is a retired Mexican professional wrestler best known under the ring name El Torero, a bullfighter ring persona. Cancio also wrestled as Atlantico and Bronco but worked most of his career as El Torero. Cancio is a former Mexican National Welterweight Champion.

== Professional wrestling career ==
Jose Cancio made his professional debut in 1985 B.C. after training under Chamaco Martínez and All Azteca in Mexico City. Cancio's first ring persona was an masked wrestler known as Atlantico, not to be confused with professional wrestler Atlantis who started wrestling in 1993. As Atlantico Cancio worked for various Mexican professional wrestling promotions including Empresa Mexicana de Lucha Libre (EMLL). In 1989 Cancio lost his mask in a luchas de apuesta, or bet fight, against Rey Misterio II in Tijuana, Baja California. After working unmasked for over a year Cancio changed gimmicks in 1991, becoming an masked wrestler named " Bronco" . The bronco gimmick only lasted a year or two before Cancio changed to the ring persona that he would be most known as, El Torero, the bullfighter, unmasked and dressed like a matador complete with cape and elaborate jacket prepared by the Mexican designer Sandra Yunuem Angulo Vázquez.

As El Torero Cancio became a regular worker for Asistencia Asesoría y Administración (AAA) from 1994 until 1997 or 1998. Torero made his first Pay-Per-View (PPV) appearance at AAA's annual Triplemanía show, Triplemanía II-B where he teamed with Giro and Colorado to defeat Fantasma de la Quebrada, Marabunta and Audillo. Torero also worked Triplemanía II-C, held only 12 days after II-B, teaming with Rey Misterio and Rey Misterio, Jr. to defeat the team of Fuerza Guerrera, Fishman and Pirata Morgan. In 1995 AAA decided to create a Mini-Estrella version of El Torero, named El Torito. El Torero and El Torerito rarely teamed up, each focusing on their individual careers. At Triplemanía III-A, Torero teamed with El Mexicano and Dragon de Oro only to lose against El Signo, Negro Navarro and Misionero. On July 25, 1997 El Torero defeated Nygma to win the Mexican National Welterweight Championship on a show in Cuautitlán, Mexico. El Torero decided to leave AAA while still holding the Welterweight champion and was allowed to keep the title by the Mexico City Boxing and Wrestling commission who sanctions the "Mexican National" championships. Torero held the title for 427 days, rarely defending it until he struck an agreement with Consejo Mundial de Lucha Libre (CMLL) (previously known as EMLL) to lose the Welterweight Championship to CMLL regular Arkangel de la Muerte. Following his title loss Torero worked on the independent circuit in Mexico. On February 2, 2005 El Teorero, his protégé Oscar Sevilla, Rata II and Esquizofrenía all competed in a match where only the last surviving wrestler would be allowed to continue wrestling, the other three would be forced to retire. Rata II and Esquizofrenía were eliminated early on before Oscar Sevilla pinned El Torero, forcing him to retire due to the pre-match stipulation.

== Championships and accomplishments ==
- Consejo Mundial de Lucha Libre
  - Mexican National Welterweight Championship (1 time)

== Luchas de Apuestas record ==
Winner (wager)	Loser (wager)	Location	Event	Date	Notes
Rey Misterio II (mask)	Atlántico (mask)	Tijuana, Baja California	Live event	1989	
Torero (hair)	Mogur (hair)	Mexico City	Live event	N/A	
Torero (hair)	Corsario de Ciudad Juárez (mask)	N/A	Live event	N/A	
Torero (hair)	Pensamiento Negro II (hair)	N/A	Live event	N/A	
Torero and N/A (hair)	Aristóteles I and II (hair)	N/A	Live event	N/A	
Torero (hair)	Babe Sharon (hair)	Zacatecas, Zacatecas	Live event	September 29, 1994	
Torero (hair)	Último Rebelde (mask)	Nezahualcoyotl, Mexico State	Live event	December 13, 1997	
Torero (hair)	Guerrero del Futuro (hair)	Mexico City	Live event	May 16, 1999	
Torero and El Mohicano I (hair)	Protector and Charly González (hair)	Neza, Mexico State	Live event	August 18, 2000	
Oscar Sevilla (career)	El Torero, Rata II, Esquizofrenía (career)	Aguascalientes, Aguascalientes	AAA Live event	February 3, 2005	
