= Mexican National Welterweight Championship =

Professional wrestling championship

- The championship belt

Details
- Promotion: Comisión de Box y Lucha Libre Mexico D.F. (Sanctioning body); Consejo Mundial de Lucha Libre (1934–1992, 1998–current); Asistencia Asesoría y Administración (1992–1998)
- Date established: June 17, 1934
- Current champion: Capitán Suicida
- Date won: March 31, 2026
Statistics
- First champion: Mario Nuñez
- Most reigns: Karloff Lagarde (4 reigns)
- Longest reign: Karloff Lagarde (1,859 days)
- Shortest reign: Psicosis (2 days)

The Mexican National Welterweight Championship (Campeonato Nacional Peso Welter in Spanish) is a Mexican professional wrestling championship created and sanctioned by Comisión de Box y Lucha Libre Mexico D.F. (the Mexico City Boxing and Wrestling Commission). While the commission sanctions the title, it does not promote the events at which the title is defended. Consejo Mundial de Lucha Libre (CMLL) promotes the events and has the everyday control of the championship. (Note: In this statement, "control" refers to the everyday use of the championship, determining which storylines the championship is being used in, who gets to challenge for it and how to use it in a public relations sense.) The official definition of the welterweight weight class in Mexico is between 77 kg (170 lb) and 87 kg (192 lb), but is not always strictly enforced. (Note: The most recent case of this is Mephisto's holding the NWA World Welterweight Championship, a belt with an 87 kg (192 lb) upper limit, despite weighing 90 kg (200 lb).) Because Lucha Libre emphasizes the lower weight classes, this division is considered more important than the normally more prestigious heavyweight division of a promotion. As it is a professional wrestling championship, it is not won legitimately; it is instead won via a scripted ending to a match or awarded to a wrestler because of a storyline.

Karloff Lagarde holds all "longevity" records for the championship. He has had the longest individual reign (1,859 days), the longest combined reign (2,731 days) and the most reigns of any champion, with four. Psicosis holds the record for the shortest reign, having held the title for only two days. (Note: Bobby Arreola and Mario Nuñez have reigns that could potentially be shorter than two days, Psicosis two-day reign is the shortest documented reign.) The current champion is Capitán Suicida, who is in his first reign. He won the title by defeating Magia Blanca on Martes Populares in Mexico City, Mexico on March 31, 2026; he is the 77th overall champion and the 58th person to hold the title.

== History ==
The championship was created on June 17, 1934, making it the oldest professional wrestling championship still promoted. Documentation is unclear on the details of the tournament other than that Mario Nuñez won the title by defeating Tony Canales in the final on June 17, 1934. In the early days of the championship no single professional wrestling promotion had exclusive control of the championship, but as Empresa Mexicana de Lucha Libre (EMLL; later renamed Consejo Mundial de Lucha Libre) became dominant it became the main promoter of the championship, with the Commission pre-approving the champions. After El Felino vacated the title in 1992, control of the championship was granted to Asistencia Asesoría y Administración (AAA), which promoted the title for the next six years. In 1998 control of the Welterweight Championship was returned to CMLL when Arkangel de la Muerte defeated El Toreo on a CMLL show. Since then the title has been promoted exclusively by CMLL.

The championship has been vacated & held up in a tournament at least 17 times; 1937, '39, '41, '56, '63, '64, '69, '75, '76, '84, '85, '87, '89, '97, and the 3 examples below.

=== 1992 Championship tournament ===
On July 16, 1992, then-reigning Mexico National Welterweight Champion El Felino defeated América to win his first ever CMLL World Heavyweight Championship. After winning the title El Felino left the Mexico National title competition to focus on his CMLL World Welterweight Championship. CMLL held a 16-man tournament over two days, starting on August 9 with the finals of the tournament the following week on August 15. All matches took place at the Pista Arena Revolucion in Mexico City, Mexico

First round
Ciclón Ramírez	W
Águila Solitaria
Kato Kung Lee Jr.
Talisman Jr.	W
Pegasso (Note: Not the same wrestler who works as Pegasso today.)	W
Babe Richard
El Cortado	W
Ludwig Star
Fantasma de la Quebrada	W
Guerrero Samurai II
Apolo Chino	W
El Mestizo
Solar II	W
Bello Incognito
Gran Apache I	W
El Vencedor

Second round
Ciclón Ramírez	W
Talisman Jr.
Pegasso	W
El Contado
Fantasma de la Quebrada	W
Apolo Chino
El Solar II	W
Gran Apache I

Semifinals
Ciclón Ramírez	W
El Contado
Fantasma de la Quebrada	W
El Solar II

Final
Ciclón Ramírez
Fantasma de la Quebrada

=== April 2013 Championship tournament ===
The Mexico National Welterweight Championship was vacated on March 20, 2013, when the then-champion Titán was unable to defend the championship due to a long-term injury. CMLL announced that they would hold a tournament for the vacant championship starting on April 19, 2013. 10 wrestlers would compete in a Torneo cibernetico elimination match with the last two wrestlers meeting at a later date in a match to determine the next champion. CMLL announced that Místico La Nueva Era, Valiente, Rey Cometa, Guerrero Maya Jr., Fuego, Volador Jr., Averno, Tiger, Sangre Azteca and Namajague. Of the group Valiente and Sagre Azteca had held the Welterweight championship before. The tournament saw Averno and Místico La Nueva Era outlast everyone to earn the rights to wrestle for the title on April 26, 2013, as the main event of CMLL's Arena Mexico 57th Anniversary Show. In the finals Averno, with the help of his cornerman Mephisto was able to defeat La Nueva Era to win the championship for the first time.

Torneo Cibernetico order of elimination

#	Eliminated	Eliminated by
1	Sangre Azteca	Fuego
2	Guerrero Maya Jr.	Volador Jr.
3	Fuego	Tiger
4	Namajague	Disqualification
5	Rey Cometa	Averno
6	Tiger	Valiente
7	Valiente	Volador Jr.
8	Volador Jr.	Místico La Nueva Era
9	Místico La Nueva Era	Averno
10	Averno	Winner

=== April 2022 Championship tournament ===
The Mexico National Welterweight Championship was vacated on December 1, 2021, when the then-champion Soberano Jr. challenged for the CMLL World Welterweight Championship. As in 2013, 10 wrestlers competed in a Torneo cibernetico elimination match. However, this time there was no second round; the winner would be crowned the new champion.

Torneo Cibernetico order of elimination

#	Eliminated	Eliminated by	Time
1	Perverso	Principe Daniel	9:20
2	Rey Samuray	Inquisidor	9:37
3	Ángel Rebelde	Suicida	11:54
4	Principe Daniel	Magia Blanca	14:46
5	Inquisidor	Rey Cometa	16:16
6	Diamond	Astral	17:20
7	Astral	Rey Cometa	20:40
8	Suicida	Magia Blanca	21:15
9	Rey Cometa	Magia Blanca	28:33
10	Magia Blanca	Winner	

== Reigns ==
Key
No.	Overall reign number
Reign	Reign number for the specific champion
Days	Number of days held
N/A	Unknown information
(NLT)	Championship change took place "no later than" the date listed
†	Championship change is unrecognized by the promotion
+	Current reign is changing daily

No.	Champion	Championship change			Reign statistics		Notes	Ref.
No.	Champion	Date	Event	Location	Reign	Days	Notes	Ref.
Empresa Mexicana de Lucha Libre (EMLL)
1	Mario Nuñez	June 17, 1934	Live event	Mexico City, Mexico	1	(Note: The exact date on which the title was vacated is unknown, which means the title reign lasted between 1 and 632 days.)	Defeated Tony Canales to become the first champion	
—	Vacated	N/A	—	—	—	—	Championship vacated for unknown reasons.	
2	Tarzán López	March 11, 1936	Live event	Mexico City, Mexico	1	(Note: The exact date on which the title was vacated is unknown, which means the title reign lasted between 1,026 and 1,390 days.)	Defeated Dientes Hernández.	
—	Vacated	1939	—	—	—	—	Championship vacated for unknown reasons.	
3	Bobby Arreola	February 3, 1940	Live event	Mexico City, Mexico	1	(Note: The exact date on which the title was vacated is unknown, which means the title reign lasted between 1 and 332 days.)	Won a tournament final	
—	Vacated	1940	—	—	—	—	Arreola was stripped of the title due to injury	
4	Lobo Negro	April 6, 1941	Live event	Mexico City, Mexico	1	231	Defeated Bobby Bonales in a tournament final	
5	Jack O'Brien	November 23, 1941	Live event	Mexico City, Mexico	1	98		
6	Ciclón Veloz	March 1, 1942	Live event	Puebla, Puebla	1	357		
7	El Santo	February 21, 1943	Live event	Mexico City, Mexico	1	352		
8	Jack O'Brien	February 8, 1944	Live event	Mexico City, Mexico	2	437		
9	Gory Guerrero	April 20, 1945	Live event	Mexico City, Mexico	1	309		
—	Vacated	February 23, 1946	—	—	—	—	Championship vacated after Guerrero won the NWA World Middleweight Championship	
10	El Santo	1950 (n)	Live event	N/A	2	(Note: The exact date on which the title was vacated is unknown, which means the title reign lasted between 999 and 1,363 days.)	Records unclear as to who Santo defeated, as well as when and where	
—	Vacated	1953	—	—	—	—	Championship vacated for unknown reasons	
11	Jalisco Gonzalez	October 5, 1956	Live event	Mexico City, Mexico	1	271	Defeated El Enfermero in a tournament final	
12	Karloff Lagarde	July 3, 1957	Live event	Acapulco, Guerrero	1	590		
13	Blue Demon	February 13, 1959	Live event	Mexico City, Mexico	1	14		
14	Karloff Lagarde	February 27, 1959	Live event	Mexico City, Mexico	2	1,132		
15	Blue Demon	April 4, 1962	Live event	Mexico City, Mexico	2	24		
16	Karloff Lagarde	April 28, 1962	Live event	Pachuca, Hidalgo	3	(Note: The exact date on which the title was vacated is unknown, which means the title reign lasted between 248 and 565 days.)		
—	Vacated	1963	—	—	—	—	Championship vacated, as Lagarde already held the NWA World Welterweight Championship	
17	Javier Escobedo	November 15, 1963	Live event	Mexico City, Mexico	1	(Note: The exact date on which the title was vacated is unknown, which means the title reign lasted between 45 and 147 days.)	Defeated Halcón Dorado in a tournament final	
—	Vacated	1964	—	—	—	—	Championship vacated after Escobedo died in an automobile accident	
18	Rizado Ruiz	April 21, 1964	Live event	Mexico City, Mexico	1	267	Defeated Halcon Dórado in a tournament final	
19	Huracán Ramírez	January 13, 1965	Live event	Acapulco, Guerrero	1	389		
20	Alberto Muñoz	February 6, 1966	Live event	Guadalajara, Jalisco	1	979		
—	Vacated	October 20, 1968	—	—	—	—	Championship vacated after Muñoz won the Mexican National Middleweight Championship	
21	Huracán Ramírez	June 14, 1969	Live event	Mexico City, Mexico	2	83	Defeated Espectro II in a tournament final	
22	Karloff Lagarde	September 5, 1969	Live event	Monterrey, Nuevo León	4	239		
23	Huracán Ramírez	May 2, 1970	Live event	Puebla, Puebla	3	902		
24	Karloff Lagarde	October 20, 1972	Live event	Mexico City, Mexico	5	295		
25	El Marquez	August 11, 1973	Live event	Mexico City, Mexico	1	53		
26	Fishman	October 3, 1973	Live event	Acapulco, Guerrero	1	577		
—	Vacated	May 3, 1975	—	—	—	—	Championship vacated after Fishman won the NWA World Welterweight Championship	
27	Fishman	October 12, 1975	Live event	Guadalajara, Jalisco	2	180	Defeated Alberto Muñoz in a tournament final.	
—	Vacated	April 9, 1976	—	—	—	—	Championship vacated after Fishman won the NWA World Welterweight Championship	
28	Blue Demon	July 30, 1976	Live event	Mexico City, Mexico	3	212	Defeated Mano Negra in a tournament final	
29	Fishman	February 27, 1977	Live event	Guadalajara, Jalisco	3	210		
30	Kung Fu	September 25, 1977	Live event	Guadalajara, Jalisco	1	441		
31	Fishman	November 23, 1977	Live event	Acapulco, Guerrero	4	130		
32	Kung Fu	April 2, 1978	Live event	Guadalajara, Jalisco	2	252		
33	Américo Rocca	December 10, 1978	Live event	Mexico City, Mexico	1	129		
34	Lizmark	April 18, 1979	Live event	Acapulco, Guerrero	1	346		
35	Américo Rocca	March 29, 1980	Live event	Mexico City, Mexico	2	217		
36	Franco Columbo	November 1, 1980	Live event	Mexico City, Mexico	1	92		
37	El Supremo	February 1, 1981	Live event	Guadalajara, Jalisco	1	422		
38	Talismán	March 30, 1982	Live event	Mexico City, Mexico	1	227		
39	Mocho Cota	November 12, 1982	Live event	Mexico City, Mexico	1	265		
40	Chamaco Valaguez	August 4, 1983	Live event	Cuernavaca, Morelos	1	357		
—	Vacated	July 26, 1984	—	—	—	—	Championship vacated after Valaquez won the NWA World Welterweight Championship.	
41	Talismán	August 19, 1984	Live event	Mexico City, Mexico	2	222	Defeated Américo Rocca in a tournament final.	
42	Américo Rocca	March 29, 1985	Live event	Mexico City, Mexico	3	156		
43	El Dandy	September 1, 1985	Live event	Guadalajara, Jalisco	1	77		
—	Vacated	November 17, 1985	—	—	—	—	Championship vacated after El Dandy won the NWA World Welterweight Championship	
44	Fuerza Guerrera	December 3, 1985	Live event	Mexico City, Mexico	1	(Note: The exact date on which the title was vacated is unknown, which means the title reign lasted between 241 and 271 days.)	Defeated Javier Cruz in a tournament final	
—	Vacated	August 1986	—	—	—	—	Championship vacated after Fuerza Guerrera left EMLL	
45	Símbolo	January 27, 1987	Live event	Mexico City, Mexico	1	173	Defeated Solar II in a tournament final	
46	Águila Solitaria	July 19, 1987	Live event	Mexico City, Mexico	1	605		
47	Bestia Salvaje	September 3, 1988	Live event	Mexico City, Mexico	1	388		
48	Ángel Azteca	February 26, 1989	Live event	N/A	1	61		
—	Vacated	April 28, 1989	—	—	—	—	Championship vacated after Ángel Azteca won the NWA World Middleweight Championship	
49	Ciclón Ramírez	May 21, 1989	Live event	Mexico City, Mexico	1	430	Defeated Bestia Salvaje in a tournament final	
50	Canelo Casas	July 25, 1990	Live event	Cuernavaca, Morelos	1	203		
51	Ciclón Ramírez	February 13, 1991	Live event	Acapulco, Guerrero	2	508		
Consejo Mundial de Lucha Libre (CMLL)
52	El Felino	July 5, 1992	Live event	Mexico City, Mexico	1	33		
—	Vacated	August 7, 1992	—	—	—	—	Championship vacated after El Felino won the CMLL World Welterweight Championship	
Asistencia Asesoría y Administración (AAA)
53	Ciclón Ramírez	August 16, 1992	Live event	Mexico City, Mexico	3	45	Defeated Fantasma de la Quebrada in the finals of a 16-man tournament.	
54	Fantasma de la Quebrada	September 30, 1992	Live event	Acapulco, Guerrero	1	28		
55	Rey Misterio Jr.	October 28, 1992	Live event	Aguascalientes, Aguascalientes	1	121		
56	Heavy Metal	February 26, 1993	Live event	Mexico City, Mexico	2	245	Previously held the title as "Canelo Casas"	
57	El Hijo del Santo	October 29, 1993	Live event	Mexico City, Mexico	1	475	El Hijo del Santo's WWA World Welterweight Championship was also at stake	
58	Psicosis	February 16, 1995	Live event	Reynosa, Tamaulipas	1	336		
59	Ultraman 2000	January 18, 1996	Live event	Tijuana, Baja California	1	61		
—	Vacated	March 19, 1996	—	—	—	—	Championship vacated when Ultraman 2000 changed his identity to Damián 666	
60	Psicosis	February 14, 1997	Live event	Xochimilco, Mexico	2	2	Defeated Super Elektra in a tournament final	
61	El Salsero	February 16, 1997	Live event	Ciudad Juárez, Chihuahua	1	117		
62	Nygma	June 13, 1997	Live event	Xochimilco, Mexico	1	42		
63	El Torero	July 25, 1997	Live event	Cuautitlán, Mexico	1	427		
Consejo Mundial de Lucha Libre (CMLL)
64	Arkangel de la Muerte	September 25, 1998	Live event	Acapulco, Guerrero	1	178		
65	Astro Rey Jr.	March 22, 1999	Live event	Puebla, Puebla	1	581		
66	Karloff Lagarde Jr.	October 23, 2000	Live event	Puebla, Puebla	1	176		
67	Tigre Blanco	April 17, 2001	Live event	Mexico City, Mexico	1	693		
68	Doctor X	March 11, 2003	Live event	Mexico City, Mexico	1	794		
69	La Máscara	May 13, 2005	Live event	Mexico City, Mexico	1	583		
70	Sangre Azteca	December 17, 2006	Live event	Mexico City, Mexico	1	973		
71	Valiente	August 16, 2009	Live event	Mexico City, Mexico	1	698		
72	Pólvora	July 15, 2011	Live event	Mexico City, Mexico	1	417		
73	Titán	September 4, 2012	Live event	Mexico City, Mexico	1	198		
—	Vacated	March 21, 2013	—	—	—	—	Championship vacated due to an injury to Titán.	
74	Averno	April 26, 2013	Arena Mexico 57th Anniversary Show	Mexico City, Mexico	1	219	Defeated Místico II in a tournament final	
75	Titán	December 1, 2013	Live event	Mexico City, Mexico	2	518		
76	Bárbaro Cavernario	May 3, 2015	Live event	Mexico City, Mexico	1	404		
77	Rey Cometa	June 10, 2016	CMLL Super Viernes	Mexico City, Mexico	1	336		
78	Soberano Jr.	May 12, 2017	CMLL Super Viernes	Mexico City, Mexico	1	1,664		
—	Vacated	December 1, 2021	CMLL Super Viernes	Mexico City, Mexico	—	—	Soberano Jr. vacated the title to challenge for the CMLL World Welterweight Championship	
79	Magia Blanca	June 24, 2022	CMLL Super Viernes	Mexico City, Mexico	1	1,376	Won a tournament to win the vacant title.	
80	Capitán Suicida	March 31, 2026	CMLL Martes Populares	Mexico City, Mexico	1	203+		

== Combined reigns ==
Key

Symbol	Meaning
†	Indicates the current champion
¤	The exact length of at least one title reign is uncertain, so the shortest possible length is used.
+	Indicates that the date changes daily for the current champion

Rank	Wrestler	No. of reigns	Combined days
1	Karloff Lagarde	5	2,504¤
2	Soberano Jr.	1	1,664
3	Magia Blanca	1	1,376
4	Huracán Ramírez	3	1,374
5	El Santo	2	1,351¤
6	Tarzán López	1	1,026¤
7	Ciclón Ramírez	3	983
8	Alberto Muñoz	1	979
10	Sangre Azteca	1	973
9	Fishman	4	969
11	Doctor X	1	794
12	El Torero	1	792
13	Titán	2	716
14	Valiente	1	698
15	Tigre Blanco	1	693
15	Kung Fu	2	693
17	Águila Solitaria	1	605
18	La Máscara	1	583
19	Astro Rey Jr.	1	581
20	Jack O'Brien	2	535
21	Américo Rocca	3	502
22	El Hijo del Santo	1	475
23	Talismán	2	449
24	Heavy Metal	2	448
25	El Supremo	1	422
26	Pólvora	1	417
27	Bárbaro Cavernario	1	404
28	Bestia Salvaje	1	388
29	Chamaco Valaguez	1	357
29	Ciclón Veloz	1	357
31	Lizmark	1	346
32	Psicosis	2	338
33	Rey Cometa	1	336
34	Gory Guerrero	1	309
35	Jalisco Gonzalez	1	271
36	Rizado Ruiz	1	267
37	Mocho Cota	1	265
38	Blue Demon	3	250
39	Fuerza Guerrera	1	241¤
40	Lobo Negro	1	231
41	Averno	1	219
42	Arkangel de la Muerte	1	178
43	Karloff Lagarde Jr.	1	176
45	Símbolo	1	173
46	Rey Misterio Jr.	1	121
47	El Salsero	1	117
48	Franco Columbo	1	92
49	El Dandy	1	77
50	Ángel Azteca	1	61
50	Ultraman 2000	1	61
52	El Marquez	1	53
53	Javier Excobar	1	45¤
54	Nygma	1	42
55	Capitán Suicida †	1	203+
56	El Felino	1	33
57	Fantasma de la Quebrada	1	28
58	Bobby Arreola	1	1¤
58	Mario Nuñez	1	1¤
