= Fantasma de la Quebrada =

Mexican professional wrestler

Personal information
- Born: Edmundo Ibaes Salas Acapulco, Guerrero, Mexico

Professional wrestling career
- Ring name: Fantasma de la Quebrada
- Trained by: Abundio Radilla; Braulio Mendoza
- Debut: 1986
- Retired: 2008

Edmundo Ibaes Salas (date of birth unknown) is a Mexican professional wrestler best known under the ring name Fantasma de la Quebrada (Spanish for "the Ghost of the Ravine", after the well known ravine near Acapulco). Ibaes was not the first wrestler to use the name; the original Fantasma de la Quebrada was active from the 1960s until the 1970s, and was a good friend of Ibaes' father. The original Fantasma gave Ibaes permission to use the name as well.

== Professional wrestling career ==
Edmundo Ibaes made his professional wrestling debut in 1986, taking the ring name Fantasma de la Quebrada with permission from the original Fantasma de la Quebrada who was a good friend of Ibaes father. Ibaes worked on the Mexican independent circuit for many years until signing with Asistencia Asesoría y Administración (AAA) in the early 1990s. in June 1992 he participated in the tournament to crown a new Mexican National Welterweight Champion but lost to Ciclón Ramírez in the final. One month later Ibaes defeated Ramírez to win the championship, holding it only for about a month before losing it to Rey Misterio, Jr. Ibaes only appeared at one of AAA's major shows, teaming with Marabunta, and Aullido as they lost to Giro, Colorado and Torero at Triplemanía II-B. Since the late 1990s Ibaes worked mainly for independent promotions, keeping only a light wrestling schedule. In 2007 Ibaes was scheduled to lose a Luchas de Apuestas match and his mask to Pirata Morgan in 2007, but did not show up for the match, claiming to be injured. A year later Ibaes finally lost his mask to Hijo del Solitario in a cage match that also included Black Fish, Dos Caras, Shu el Guerrero, Super Muñeco, Black Man, Jr., Astro de Oro, Hijo de Cien Caras and Máscara Ságrada. After the match he introduced his son Fantasma de la Quebrada. Jr.

== Championships and accomplishments ==
- Consejo Mundial de Lucha Libre
  - Mexican National Welterweight Championship (1 time)

== Luchas de Apuestas record ==
Winner (wager)	Loser (wager)	Location	Event	Date	Notes
Fantasma de la Quebrada (mask)	Ludwig Star (mask)	Acapulco, Guerrero	Live event	March 3, 2006	
El Hijo del Solitario (mask)	Fantasma de la Quebrada (mask)	Acapulco, Guerrero	Live event	March 21, 2008	(Note: They were the last two wrestlers left in a multi-man steel cage match.)
