= Venum Black =

Mexican professional wrestler (born 1975)

Personal information
- Born: Julián Carrillo; 1975 (44 or 45) Cd. Obregon, Sonora, Mexico

Professional wrestling career
- Ring name(s): El Vagabundo; Power Raider Rojo; Power Raider Verde; Venum; Venum Black; Muerte Roja
- Billed height: 1.73 m (5 ft 8 in)
- Billed weight: 93 kg (205 lb)
- Trained by: Rey Misterio, Sr.
- Debut: 1992

Julian Carrillo (born 1975) is a Mexican professional wrestler best known under the ring name Venum Black or simply Venum. He gained national exposure in Mexico working for Asistencia Asesoría y Administración (AAA), initially as a Power Rangers look-alike called Power Raider Rojo and later Power Raider Verde. He also worked for the World Wrestling Federation (WWF, now WWE) through AAA's working agreement with them in the late 1990s. Since 1998, he has worked primarily on the Mexican Independent circuit and at one point introduced a wrestler known as "Venum Black Jr."

== Professional wrestling career ==
Carrillo started training for his professional wrestling career while still in high school. He was trained by Rey Misterio, Sr. in Tijuana and made his debut at the age of either 16 or 17 years in 1992. He wrestled under the ring name "El Vagabundo" ("The Vagabond" or "The Tramp" in Spanish) in 1993 and 1994. He was later hired by Asistencia Asesoría y Administración (AAA) and given a new ring name "Power Raider Rojo" (Spanish for "Red Power Ranger") and became part of Los Power Raiders, five wrestlers that very closely resembled the Power Rangers characters from the TV show. AAA booker Antonio Peña wanted to create a group of high flying wrestlers that would appeal to the younger fans. After the first match Carrillo became "Power Raider Verde", moving from red to Green. Peña was later sued by the company Mattel who created the Power Rangers and owned the copyright. This forced Peña to repackage Los Power Raiders as Los Cadetes Del Espacio ("The Space Cadets"; which also Discovery, Super Nova, Ludxor Boomerang and Frisbee) instead. Carillo became known as Venum but retained the green color scheme in his new mask and outfit as a call back to his Power Raider Verde days. Los Cadetes went on to have a long storyline feud with Los Rudos de la Galaxia ("The Villains of the Galaxy"), who were billed as the evil opposites of Los Cadetos. Starting in 1996 AAA had a working agreement with the World Wrestling Federation (WWF, later WWF) which brought Carillo and a number of other AAA wrestlers to the United States. His first match in the WWF was on the WWF"s Shotgun Saturday Night TV show where he teamed with Mascarita Sagrada, Jr. losing to Histeria and Mini Mankind. For the match he was introduced as Venum Black instead of Venum. The following day, on January 19, Venum teamed up with Perro Aguayo Jr. to defeat the team of Maniaco and Mosco de la Merced, in a match at the 1997 Royal Rumble pay-per-view that was held before the broadcast begun. Venum and Histeria continued their AAA storyline in the WWF as well, with Histeria defeating Venum on the March 23 edition of Shotgun Saturday Night. He also worked on the WWF's main weekly show, Raw is War, teaming with fellow Cadetos del Espacio Discovery and Super Nova to defeat the Rudos de la Galaxia team of Abismo Negro, El Mosco and Histeria. Venum's final match for the WWE took place on March 25 with the Los Cadetas team of Venum, Discovery Ludxor and Super Nova defeating the Los Rudos de la Galaxia team of Abismo Negro, El Misco, Histeria and Maniaco.

Carrillo left AAA in late 1997 to work for Promo Azteca, a group that had broken away from AAA in 1997. In Promo Azteca he worked as "Venum Black" and continued the storyline feud with Histeria, who now worked for Promo Azteca as Super Crazy. The storyline led to Venum Black losing a Luchas de Apuestas, or bet match and was forced to unmask after the loss and state his real name per Lucha Libre traditions. He would also work for International Wrestling Revolution Group (IWRG) at the same time as working for Promo Azteca, before leaving Promo Azteca to wrestle in IWRG full-time. He left IWRG after finding no success. He returned to AAA in 2001 for one night only, and later worked briefly for them under the name "Muerte Roja" ("Red Death"). He is currently wrestling on the independent circuit in Mexico Tijuana

== Championships and accomplishments ==
- Pro Wrestling Illustrated

- PWI ranked him # 73 of the 500 best singles wrestlers of the PWI 500 in 1999

== Luchas de Apuestas record ==
Winner (wager)	Loser (wager)	Location	Event	Date	Notes
Venum Black (mask)	Latin Boy (hair)	N/A	Live event	N/A	
Super Crazy (hair)	Venum Black (mask)	Naucalpan, State of Mexico	Promo Azteca Live event	March 6, 1998	
Venum Black (hair)	King Azteca (hair)	Tijuana, Baja California	Live event	May 15, 2000	
Venum Black (hair)	King Azteca (hair)	Tijuana, Baja California	Live event	March 30, 2001	
Venum Black (hair)	X-Fly (hair)	Tijuana, Baja California	Live event	September 26, 2003	(Note: Relevos suicida match: lost to Príncipe Arandú and TJ Boy and as a result were forced to fight for their hair.)
Extreme Tiger (mask)	Venum Black (hair)	Tijuana, Baja California	live event	April 9, 2004	
