= La Sociedad =

Professional wrestling group

- Dorian Roldán, Konnan and El Hijo del Perro Aguayo forming an alliance on June 20, 2010

Stable
- Members: See below
- Name(s): La Sociedad; La Nueva Sociedad
- Debut: August 27, 2010 (first incarnation); December 8, 2013 (second incarnation)
- Disbanded: February 3, 2013 (first incarnation); 2016 (second incarnation)
- Years active: 2010–2016

La Sociedad (later reformed as La Nueva Sociedad in 2013; Spanish for "The (New) Society") was a Mexican lucha libre, or professional wrestling stable, that worked for Lucha Libre AAA World Wide (AAA). The group was originally formed in the summer of 2010 with the merger of La Legión Extranjera, Los Perros del Mal, La Milicia and Los Maniacos.

== History ==
=== Formation (2010) ===
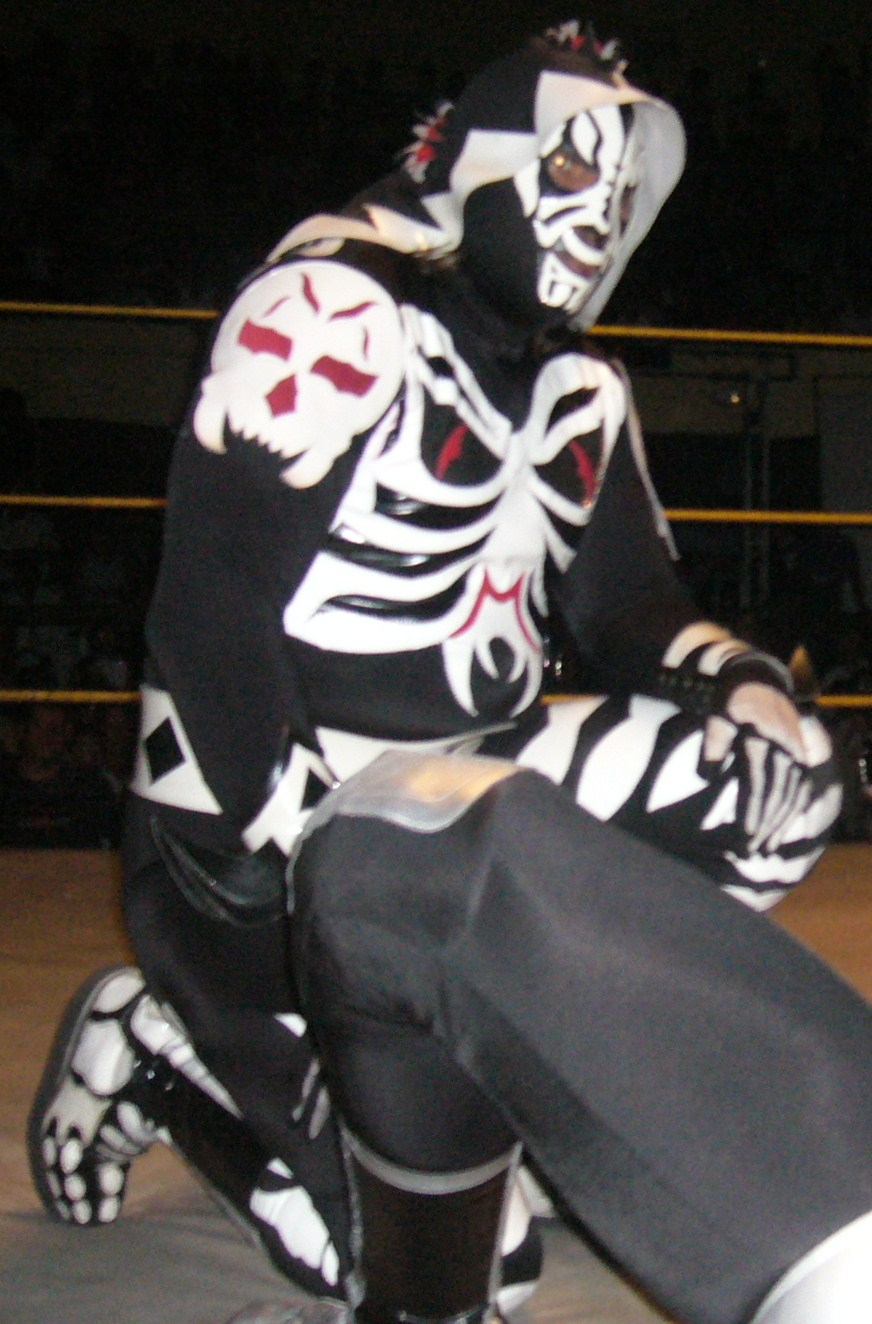
L.A. Park

On March 12, 2010, at Lucha Libre AAA World Wide's (AAA) Rey de Reyes event, La Legión Extranjera's leader Konnan faced Cibernético in a grudge match, four months in the making. The rest of La Legión tried to interfere in the match, but were taken out by Los Psycho Circus, after which Cibernético scored a clean pinfall victory to seemingly end his feud with Konnan. However, after the match Legión members Alex Koslov and Hernandez attacked Cibernético, which led to El Mesías running out to make the save. He, however, was taken out by a hooded man swinging a chair, who then removed his hood to reveal himself as L.A. Park, who had wrestled for AAA from 1992 to 1996 under the ring name La Parka and had been forced to rename himself after leaving the promotion, when a court declared that AAA owned the rights to the character. L.A. Park then aligned himself with Konnan, noting his history with him from their days back in World Championship Wrestling, and Dorian Roldán, who was threatening to take over the company from his father, AAA president Joaquín Roldán, before having a heated confrontation with the second incarnation of the La Parka character, whom he dubbed an "impostor Parka". The two Parkas were set to face each other on June 6, 2010, in the main event of AAA's biggest event of the year, Triplemanía XVIII, in a match, where the winner would earn the rights to the name "La Parka". At Triplemanía XVIII, L.A. Park used an illegal Martinete on La Parka and then went to use a steel chair on him, which led to Joaquín Roldán entering the ring and pleading him to stop the assault. Park then teased using the chair on Joaquín instead, which led to Dorian entering the ring to protest. Park then pushed Dorian down, before hitting Joaquín with the chair, which caused Dorian to turn on him, beating him down with a steel chair. Suddenly, Damián 666 and Halloween from the Perros del Mal wrestling promotion, for which Park had worked for during his time away from AAA, entered the ring, chased Dorian away and dragged Park on top of Parka, after which La Legión Extranjera's referee El Hijo del Tirantes made a three count, declaring Park the victor. After the match wrestlers from Los Perros del Mal, led by the promotion's founder and owner, El Hijo del Perro Aguayo, filled the ring, before declaring a war on AAA. On June 10 AAA announced that it would respect Mexico City Boxing and Wrestling Commission's decision to throw out the match due to outside interference and as a result both L.A. Park and La Parka kept their names.

After initially teasing joining forces with AAA to fight Los Perros del Mal, La Legión Extranjera joined forces with the invaders on June 20 at an event in Zapopan, Jalisco. The following month Decnnis started a new sub–group named La Milicia within La Legión, consisting of himself, Billy Boy, Black Abyss, Chris Stone, Psicosis III and Tigre Cota. Black Abyss and Psicosis III have since left the promotion, while Chris Stone's brother Alan, who turned on El Elegido, and Tigre Cota's AAA Northern Tag Team Championship partner Tito Santana have joined the group. The members of La Milicia are low–carders, situated clearly below the rest of the group. When working for independent hardcore wrestling promotion Desastre Total Ultraviolento (DTU), the group is referred to as La Milicia Extrema. Los Perros del Mal, La Legión Extranjera and La Milicia then came together to form La Sociedad, under the leadership of Dorian Roldán. In September the three groups were joined by the AAA World Tag Team Champions Silver King and Último Gladiador, known collectively as Los Maniacos, to complete La Sociedad.

=== Feuding with AAA (2010–2012) ===
La Sociedad then waged a war on AAA, but prior to their scheduled four–on–four elimination steel cage match against the promotion, Dorian Roldán and Konnan announced that one of AAA's most popular técnicos (good guys), Cibernético, had decided to abandon the promotion and join La Sociedad instead. This was followed by La Parka finding Octagón bloodied and someone resembling Cibernético driving away on a motorcycle. The two teams were scheduled to face each other on October 1 at Héroes Inmortales IV with La Sociedad being represented by Electroshock, El Zorro, Hernandez and L.A. Park, while Legado AAA was scheduled to consist of Cibernético, Heavy Metal, La Parka and Octagón. Electroshock, the leader of Los Maniacos, had made no official announcement on whether he was joining La Sociedad or not, but agreed to take part in the match in order to get his hands on Heavy Metal, with whom he had been feuding the past weeks. Prior to the match AAA, buying Konnan and Dorian's claim of Cibernético's turn, replaced him and the injured Octagón in the match with Dark Ozz and Dark Cuervo. In the end Cibernético interfered in the match and helped Legado AAA pick up the win, but refused to celebrate with the victors, due to being upset with them believing he had turned on the company. Cibernético then went on to re–form his old stable Los Bizarros with Amadeus, Escoria, Nygma and Taboo, vowing to show AAA how to really battle La Sociedad.

During the stable warfare between La Sociedad and AAA, Perros del Mal's leader El Hijo del Perro Aguyao was engaged in his own feud with El Mesías, who had returned from an injury to help AAA fight Los Perros del Mal. On August 14, 2010, at Verano de Escandalo, Aguayo pinned Mesías in a six man tag team match between Los Perros and AAA, after hitting him with a chair. At Héroes Inmortales IV El Mesías gained a measure of revenge on Aguayo by defeating him in a singles match.

La Legión Extranjera's leader Konnan had been feuding with La Hermandad 187 (Nicho el Millonario and Joe Líder), since turning on them in April 2010. After La Legión Extranjera injured Nicho and cost him and Líder the AAA World Tag Team Championship, La Hermandad 187 faced Konnan, Damián 666 and Halloween in a three–on–two handicap hardcore match at Héroes Inmortales IV, in which Nicho and Líder avenged the past couple of months by bloodying Konnan before pinning him for the win.

On November 14, 2010, Electroshock officially announced that he was not part of La Sociedad and urged his stablemates Silver King and Último Gladiador to leave the group. At the November 18 event in Naucalpan Electroshock once again turned down an offer to join La Sociedad and was as a result beaten down by Silver King, Último Gladiador and La Milicia. On November 28 the man who had attacked Octagón prior to Héroes Inmortales IV was revealed as Super Fly, when he attacked Octagón and his fellow Real Fuerza Aérea co–leader Aero Star and beat them down with help from La Milicia. On December 5 at Guerra de Titanes El Zorro defeated Dr. Wagner Jr., with help from his La Sociedad stable mates, to win the AAA Mega Championship. In the main event of the evening Damián 666, Halloween and X-Fly of Los Perros del Mal faced Los Psycho Circus (Monster Clown, Murder Clown and Psycho Clown), a trio, who hadn't lost a single match since their debut in December 2007, in an elimination steel cage weapons match. In the end of the match, someone wearing a Monster Clown mask climbed up the cage and prevented Murder Clown from escaping. After the man had dropped Murder Clown back into the cage, Halloween climbed out of the cage to win the match and end Los Psycho Circus' long undefeated streak. Afterwards, the man who had interfered in the match was revealed as El Hijo del Perro Aguayo, who had suffered a knee injury after his match with El Mesías and was supposed to be out of action for the rest of the year.

On January 15, 2011, during the year's first television tapings, Damián 666's son Bestia 666 made his AAA debut and joined La Sociedad in a match, where he, his father and Halloween were defeated by Los Psycho Circus. After the match El Hijo del Perro Aguayo made another appearance and unmasked the members of Los Psycho Circus. On March 13 Alan Stone and Jennifer Blake defeated Faby Apache and Pimpinela Escarlata to win the AAA World Mixed Tag Team Championship. Later that same night, Lizmark Jr. made his AAA return after a sixteen-year absence and joined Los Perros del Mal, while Billy Boy turned on La Sociedad and joined Los Bizarros.

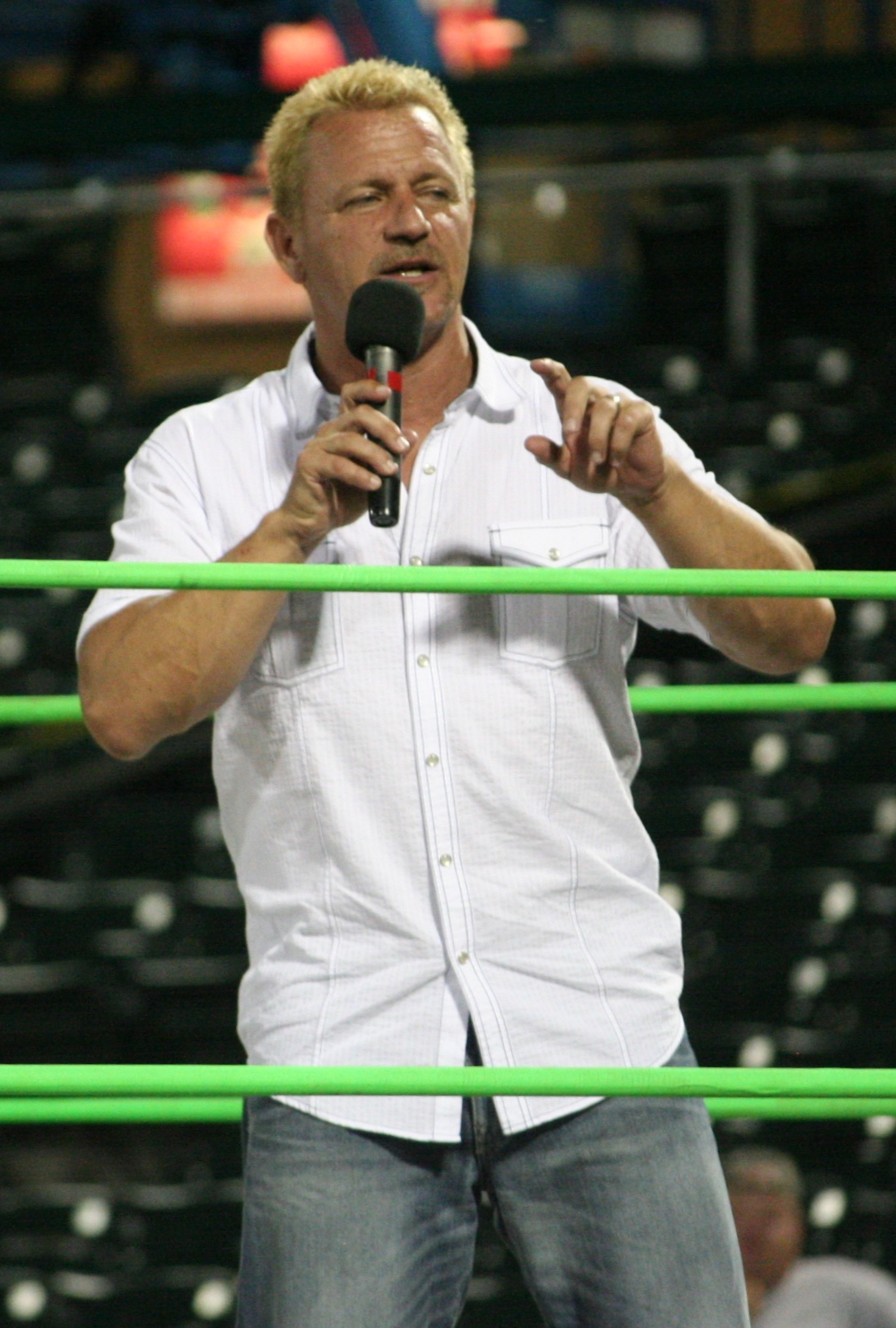
Jeff Jarrett

In late 2010 L.A. Park began asking Konnan for a shot at the AAA Mega Championship and was promised his shot if he managed to defeat El Mesías at Guerra de Titanes. Park did just that, but instead of putting together a match between him and the new Mega Champion, his La Sociedad partner El Zorro, the next title shot was awarded to Los Bizarros member Charly Manson to set up a grudge match for the title between him and El Zorro, causing dissension between Park and Konnan. On February 28 Park entered the 2011 Rey de Reyes tournament in order to solidify his spot as the number one contender, defeating Dr. Wagner Jr., Halloween and Nicho el Millonario in his semifinal match. During the match Park was attacked by La Sociedad member Damián 666, who was seemingly trying to prevent him from advancing in the tournament, but instead the interference distracted Wagner Jr. and cost him the match. On March 18 at the Rey de Reyes pay-per-view, Park was eliminated from the finals of the tournament, after brawling with rival El Mesías to a double countout. At the same event Los Perros del Mal, represented by El Hijo del Perro Aguayo, Damián 666, Halloween and Super Crazy, continued their win streak over Los Psycho Circus, by defeating them and Dr. Wagner Jr., the alliance known as Potencia Mundial, in an eight-man tag team match. Meanwhile, El Zorro was successful in his first title defense by defeating Charly Manson. At the following television taping on March 21, Konnan, disappointed with the performance of La Milicia, demoted Decnnis and named Super Fly the sub–group's new leader. Later that same night, Los Maniacos lost the AAA World Tag Team Championship to Jack Evans and the 2011 Rey de Reyes, Extreme Tiger. Following the loss, Silver King and Último Gladiador began showing signs of dissension, but were brought back together by La Legión Extranjera member Chessman, who joined Los Maniacos to form La Maniarquía. Meanwhile, the AAA Mega Champion El Zorro, having caught wind of L.A. Park's intention of challenging for his title, seemingly started interfering in his matches under his old mask, costing him back–to–back multi–man tag team matches at the April 27 and 30 TV tapings, escalating the dissension within La Sociedad in the process. In early May, Jeff Jarrett, the founder of American promotion Total Nonstop Action Wrestling, announced his and TNA's alignment with Dorian Roldán and La Sociedad and their participation in Triplemanía XIX. Konnan, however, was against the idea of his former employer coming to AAA and believed that Roldán had made a mistake. Jarrett and fellow TNA worker Abyss arrived to AAA on May 18 for a confrontation with Konnan and La Sociedad. In the end, Konnan and Jarrett revealed that they were in fact on the same page with each other and turned on El Zorro, along with L.A. Park, with Konnan announcing that Jarrett would be challenging for his AAA Mega Championship at Triplemanía XIX. It was later revealed that the man who had attacked Park under El Zorro's mask was actually Charly Manson, who had been sent by Cibernético to cause dissension within the ranks of La Sociedad. On June 18 at Triplemanía XIX, Damián 666, Halloween and X-Fly defeated Los Psycho Circus in a tournament final to become the first ever AAA World Trios Champions, while Jeff Jarrett defeated El Zorro to become the new AAA Mega Champion and L.A. Park ended his feud with El Mesías by defeating him in a Mask vs. Hair match.

At Triplemanía XIX, Nicho el Millonario interfered in a six-man tag team match, where his tag team partner Joe Líder, Electroshock and Heavy Metal faced Los Maniacos and was, as a result, suspended for three months by AAA following the event in accordance to a deal made between Konnan and Joaquín Roldán. Prior to the start of his suspension, Nicho appeared at the June 30 tapings, voicing his displeasure over the suspension, claiming that he had been there for the company from the beginning even though they had given his name (Psicosis) to another performer "not even close to his level", before noting that he had a son and that if he was suspended without pay, he would have to find work from another promotion. Nicho returned to AAA on July 16, threatening Roldan, which led to Joe Líder trying to calm his partner down. This in turn led to Nicho declaring that if Líder was with Roldan, they were no longer friends. Later in the event, Nicho interfered in Líder's match and turned on him, effectively ending La Hermandad 187. After another attack at Verano de Escándalo, Nicho attacked Líder for the third time on August 19, before putting on a Perros del Mal shirt, which led to El Hijo del Perro Aguayo, making his first AAA appearance in two months, officially welcoming him to the group. On September 16, Konnan rewarded Chessman by moving him back to La Legión Extrangera and naming him the group's new general, taking over the spot formerly held by El Zorro. In the process, Decnnis was also moved from La Milicia to Los Maniacos. Los Perros del Mal and Los Psycho Circus ended their year-long rivalry on October 9 at Héroes Inmortales, where Damián 666, Halloween and Nicho el Millonario were defeated in a Masks vs. Hairs steel cage match and were all shaved bald. At the same event, Abyss and Chessman defeated Extreme Tiger and Jack Evans to bring the AAA World Tag Team Championship back to La Sociedad, while El Hijo del Perro Aguayo failed to capture the AAA Latin American Championship from Dr. Wagner Jr. After the match between Wagner and Aguayo, Octagón shocked AAA by turning on the promotion and attacking Wagner. La Parka then entered the ring to seemingly confront his longtime partner, before also turning on Wagner and attacking him along with Octagón, Aguayo, Konan Big and Silver King. On November 5, Konnan named Octagón the new leader of La Milicia, replacing Super Fly. Octagón then showed that he had not forgotten what Super Fly had done to him fourteen months earlier by ordering the rest of the group to attack him, kicking him out of La Milicia. At the November 14 tapings, Héctor Garza jumped from Consejo Mundial de Lucha Libre (CMLL) to AAA, aligning himself with Los Perros del Mal. On December 16 at Guerra de Titanes, L.A. Park defeated Dr. Wagner Jr. for the AAA Latin American Championship. Following the match, a new group named El Consejo ("The Council"), consisting of former CMLL workers El Texano Jr., Toscano and Máscara Año 2000 Jr., made its debut, declaring war on both AAA and La Sociedad. On March 11, 2012, La Sociedad's title domination ended, when Damián 666, Halloween and X-Fly lost the AAA World Trios Championship to Los Psycho Circus. The following day, the three announced that they had quit Los Perros del Mal. On March 18 at Rey de Reyes, the short-lived alliance between La Sociedad and La Parka came to an end, when Octagón and La Milicia turned on him, after he had lost his rivalry against Los Bizarros. Rey de Reyes also continued the rivalry between La Sociedad stablemates, Jeff Jarrett and L.A. Park. After Jarrett's interference caused Park to get eliminated from the Rey de Reyes tournament, Park came back during the main event and cost Jarrett the AAA Mega Championship in his match against El Mesías. On August 5 at Triplemanía XX, Jarrett and the debuting Kurt Angle represented Dorian Roldán in a match, where they faced Park and Electroshock, representing Joaquín Roldán, with the Roldáns' hairs on the line. Electroshock won the match for his team by pinning Angle, but Joaquín announced that he did not want his son shaved after he had agreed to disband La Sociedad. However, Dorian ended up once again betraying his father by attacking him and shaving him instead. The event also featured Psicosis defeating longtime rival Joe Líder in another Hair vs. Hair match and El Hijo del Perro Aguayo unsuccessfully challenging El Mesías for the AAA Mega Championship. The following November, El Consejo joined La Sociedad. On December 2 at Guerra de Titanes, El Consejo member El Texano Jr. defeated El Mesías to bring the AAA Mega Championship back to La Sociedad.

During a television taping on February 3, 2013, Dorian Roldán and Konnan went on a rampage, firing Atomic Boy, La Jarochita and Pepe Casas from AAA, before being interrupted by Joaquín Roldán, who instead fired both Dorian and Konnan. He then also threatened to fire any member of La Sociedad that did not help eject Dorian and Konnan from the building, leading to the rudos turning on their former leaders, effectively ending La Sociedad.

=== La Nueva Sociedad (2013–2016) ===
A second incarnation of La Sociedad, La Nueva Sociedad ("The New Society"), was formed on December 8, 2013, at the end of Guerra de Titanes by the returning Dorian Roldán and Konnan, Daga, El Hijo del Fantasma, El Hijo del Perro Aguayo, Jeff Jarrett, Karen Jarrett, Psicosis, Sexy Star, Silver King, El Texano Jr. and El Zorro. Prior to Guerra de Titanes, El Hijo del Perro Aguayo had effectively become a técnico, forming a partnership with former rival Cibernético, which led to Los Perros del Mal turning on him. It was also suggested that Konnan, whom Aguayo considered his brother, would join him as a técnico. At Guerra de Titanes, Aguayo turned on Cibernético, El Mesías and La Parka following a main event eight-man tag team match, attacking the three along with El Consejo and Los Perros del Mal. This led to El Zorro, who had recently returned to AAA, running out, but instead of saving the técnicos, he also turned on them, joining the rudos. La Nueva Sociedad was completed by Sexy Star, who returned from her maternity leave during the event, saving Karen Jarrett from Faby Apache, before the new group was formally introduced by Roldán. In February 2015, Los Hell Brothers (Averno, Chessman and Cibernético) joined La Sociedad. In May, longtime rival of La Sociedad, El Mesías, turned rudo and also joined the stable. On September 20, Konnan stepped down as the leader of La Sociedad with El Hijo del Fantasma announced as his replacement. Meanwhile, Johnny Mundo became the newest member of the stable. The group disbanded in 2016.

== Members ==
=== Second incarnation ===
- Dorian Roldán

El Consejo

- El Hijo del Fantasma (second leader)

Los Perros del Mal

- Joe Líder
- Khan del Mal

Former members

- Averno
- Black Warrior
- Brian Cage
- Chessman
- Cibernético
- Daga
- Eterno
- El Hijo del Perro Aguayo
- Jeff Jarrett
- Johnny Mundo
- Karen Jarrett (valet)
- Konnan (first leader)
- Máscara Año 2000 Jr.
- Myzteziz
- El Mesías
- La Parka Negra
- Pentagón Jr.
- Ron Killings
- Psicosis
- Sexy Star
- Silver King
- Steve Pain
- Sting
- Taya
- The pope (TNA)
- El Texano Jr.
- El Zorro

=== First incarnation ===
The first incarnation of La Sociedad was led by Dorian Roldán and consisted of members of La Legión Extranjera, Los Perros del Mal, La Milicia, Los Maniacos/La Maniarquia and El Consejo.

La Legión Extranjera

- Konnan (leader)
- Abyss
- A.J. Styles
- Alex Koslov
- Angelina Love
- Carlito Caribbean Cool
- Christina Von Eerie
- D'Angelo Dinero
- Gunner
- Hernandez
- El Hijo del Tirantes (referee)
- El Ilegal
- Jeff Jarrett
- Jennifer Blake
- Karen Jarrett (valet)
- Konan Big
- Kurt Angle
- La Parka
- La Parka Negra
- Magnus
- Mickie James
- Mr. Anderson
- Pentagón Jr.
- Rob Terry
- Rob Van Dam
- Samoa Joe
- Scott Steiner
- Sexy Star
- Velvet Sky
- El Zorro

Los Perros del Mal

- El Hijo del Perro Aguayo (leader)
- Bestia 666
- Daga
- Damián 666
- Halloween
- Héctor Garza
- L.A. Park
- Lizmark Jr.
- Nicho el Millonario/Psicosis
- Pete Powers
- Super Crazy
- Taya Valkyrie
- Teddy Hart
- X-Fly

La Milicia

- Alan Stone
- Billy Boy
- Black Abyss
- Decnnis (original leader; also worked as a member Los Maniacos)
- Chris Stone
- Octagón (third leader)
- Psicosis III
- Super Fly (second leader)
- Tigre Cota
- Tito Santana
- Violento Jack

El Consejo

- Argos
- Máscara Año 2000 Jr.
- Semental
- El Texano Jr.
- Toscano

Los Maniacos / La Maniarquia

- Chessman (also worked as a member of La Legión Extranjera)
- Silver King (also worked as the leader of El Consejo)
- Último Gladiador (also worked as a member of La Legión Extranjera)

== Championships and accomplishments ==
- Lucha Libre AAA World Wide
  - AAA Fusión Championship (1 time) – El Hijo del Fantasma
  - AAA Latin American Championship (2 times) – L.A. Park (1) and Chessman (1)
  - AAA Mega Championship (3 times) – El Zorro (1), Jeff Jarrett (1), and El Texano Jr. (1)
  - AAA Reina de Reinas Championship (1 time) – Taya
  - AAA Cruiserweight Championship / AAA World Cruiserweight Championship (2 times) – Daga (1) and El Hijo del Fantasma (1)
  - AAA World Mixed Tag Team Championship (4 times) – Alex Koslov and Christina Von Eerie (1), Alan Stone and Jennifer Blake (1), Halloween and Mari Apache (1), and Pentagón Jr. and Sexy Star (1)
  - AAA World Tag Team Championship (4 times) – Silver King and Último Gladiador (1), Abyss and Chessman (1), Joe Líder and Pentagón Jr. (1), and Averno and Chessman (1)
  - AAA World Trios Championship (1 time) – Damián 666, Halloween and X-Fly
  - AAA Northern Tag Team Championship (1 time) – Tigre Cota and Tito Santana
  - Copa Triplemanía XXII (2014) – El Hijo del Perro Aguayo
  - Rey de Reyes (2012) – El Hijo del Perro Aguayo
  - Rey de Reyes (2015) – El Texano Jr.
- Perros del Mal Producciones
  - Mexican National Heavyweight Championship (2 times,) – X-Fly (1), and Héctor Garza (1)
  - Perros del Mal Extremo Championship (1 time) – X-Fly

== Luchas de Apuestas record ==
| Winner (wager) | Loser (wager) | Location | Event | Date | Notes |
|---|---|---|---|---|---|
| El Zorro (hair) | Nicho el Millonario (hair) | Ciudad Juárez, Chihuahua | Live event | October 30, 2010 | (Note: Weapons match) |
| L.A. Park (mask) | El Mesías (hair) | Mexico City, Mexico | Triplemanía XIX | June 18, 2011 | |
| Psycho Clown (mask) | X-Fly (hair) | Guadalajara, Jalisco | Verano de Escándalo | July 31, 2011 | (Note: Six-man tag team steel cage match between Los Perros del Mal and Los Psycho Circus.) |
| Monster Clown (mask), Murder Clown (mask) and Psycho Clown (mask) | Damián 666 (hair), Halloween (hair) and Nicho el Millonario (hair) | Monterrey, Nuevo León | Héroes Inmortales | October 9, 2011 | (Note: Steel cage match.) |
| Sexy Star (mask) | Pimpinela Escarlata (hair) | Zapopan, Jalisco | Rey de Reyes | March 18, 2012 | (Note: Twelve-person steel cage match.) |
| Psicosis (hair) | Joe Líder (hair) | Mexico City | Triplemanía XX | August 5, 2012 | |
| Joaquín Roldán (hair) | Dorian Roldán (hair) | Mexico City | Triplemanía XX | August 5, 2012 | (Note: Tag team match, where Electroshock and L.A. Park faced Jeff Jarrett and Kurt Angle.) |
| Psycho Clown (mask) | El Texano Jr. (hair) | Mexico City | Triplemanía XXII | August 17, 2014 | |
