= Tito Santana (AAA) =

Mexican professional wrestler

Personal information
- Born: Ignacio Patiño; February 11, 1986 (age 40)
- Family: Kendor (father); Kendor Jr. (brother)

Professional wrestling career
- Ring name(s): Kendor II; Impulso; Tito Santana; Soul Rocker
- Billed height: 170 cm (5 ft 7 in)
- Billed weight: 85 kg (187 lb)
- Trained by: Kendor
- Debut: 2000

Ignacio Patiño (born February 11, 1986), better known under the ring names Soul Rocker and Tito Santana is a Mexican professional wrestler, currently working for promotion Lucha Libre AAA Worldwide (AAA). He is the son of retired professional wrestler Kendor and actually worked as Kendor II early in his career. From 2005 through 2012, he used the name Tito Santana, although he is not related to the better-known Tito Santana. He began using the name again in 2017 after losing his mask. As Soul Rocker he wore wrestling gear reminiscent of the elaborate stage costumes of the rock group Kiss.

The Soul Rocker character was originally introduced as part of a group called Los Inferno Rockers (with Machine Rocker, Devil Rocker, Demon Rocker and Uru Rocker). Tito Santana is currently part of a trio known as El Poder del Norte (formerly El Nuevo Poder del Norte) along with Carta Brava Jr. and Mocho Cota Jr. that works for Lucha Libre AAA Worldwide. The trio are former AAA World Trios Champions. Prior to 2012 he teamed up with Tigre Cota (Mocho Cota Jr. under a different alias) and Rio Bravo to form the original El Poder del Norte, a group that held the AAA Northern Tag Team Championship on three occasions.

== Professional wrestling career ==
Patiño received most of his training from his father, a wrestler known under the ring name Kandor. He made his debut in 2000, working under a wrestling mask as "Kandor II", teaming with his older brother Kandor Jr. and his father. In the early 2000s Los Kandors held the Federación Internacional de Lucha Libre (FILL) Trios Championship, although records only mention it after the fact, without a specific date given.

=== El Poder del Norte (2005–2012) ===
By 2005, Patiño was known by the name "Tito Santana", although he had no relationship to the first Tito Santana (real name: Mercedes Solis). Santana, teaming with masked wrestler Rio Bravo, formed a team known as El Poder del Norte ("The Northern Power") and worked in Monterrey, often appearing on AAA shows when they toured through Nuevo León. In the winter of 2005 El Poder del Norte teamed up with Kaoma Jr. and Obscuridad to defeat Hombre Sin Miedo, Principe Zafiro and Rey Cometa in the opening match of AAA's Guerra de Titanes show. Santana and Rio Bravo won the local Northern Mexico Tag Team Championship at some point in 2007, which was later re-branded as the AAA Northern Tag Team Championship with El Poder del Norte as the first champions. On August 6, 2007 the duo lost the championship to Insolito and Maravilla Lopez, but regained the championship three months later. Their second reign as AAA Northern Tag Team Champions lasted 419 days, ending on January 11, 2009 when they lost to La Momia and Virtual X.

At the 2008 Rey de Reyes, Tito Santana and Rio Bravo teamed up with Black Mamba, losing to the trio of Principe Diamante, Street Boy and Tigre Cota in the opening match of the show. In 2009 El Poder del Norte' became a trio as they added former rival Tigre Cota to their group. At some point in 2009 Rio Bravo quit AAA, but since he was masked AAA opted to give another wrestler the Rio Bravo mask and name, presenting it as if it was the same person under the mask. The trio lost to Real Fuerza Aerea ("The Royal Air Force"; Argenis, Atomic Boy and Laredo Kid) at AAA's Héroes Inmortales III show. Santana and Cota would win the AAA Northern Tag Team Championship on March 7, 2010, which was the last recorded championship match.

=== La Milicia (2010–2012) ===
In the fall of 2010, Tito Santana and Tigre Cota were introduced as part of a larger group known as La Milicia ("The Militia"), where the members would all wear camouflage clothes and display a more militaristic attitude. At this point the second Rio Bravo character is abandoned while Santana and Cota began working for AAA more or less full-time. La Milicia would later be rolled up into the rudo (those that portray the "bad guys" in professional wrestling) group known as La Sociedad ("The Society"). Santana, Cota and Super Fly represented La Milicia in the tournament to crown the first ever AAA World Trios Championship, but lost to La Secta (Dark Cuervo, Dark Espiritu and Dark Ozz in the first round. One of La Milicia's' last matches was at Triplemanía XIX where Santana, Cota, Decnnis and Dark Dragon lost to Aero Star, Argenis, Fénix and Sugi San.

=== Los Inferno Rockers (2012–2016) ===
In mid-2012 AAA introduced a new masked trio known as Los Inferno Rockers (Machine Rocker, Devil Rocker and Soul Rocker), a trio of masked, glam-rocker inspired wrestlers who resembled the rock band Kiss. It was later verified that the former Tito Santana was under the Soul Rocker mask. The trio was set up as the rivals of Los Psycho Circus (Psycho Clown, Murder Clown and Monster Clown), who at the time had been undefeated for years. They later introduced the 201 cm (6 ft 7 in) tall Uro Rocker to the team, targeting Psycho Clown specifically. It was later revealed that Uro Rocker was supposed to be the main rival of Psycho Clown, but the wrestler playing the part hurt wrestlers he worked with and was quickly dropped from the group.

The group lost to Los Psycho Circus at the 2012 Guerra de Titanes show, their first appearance at a major AAA show. 18 days later the trio wrestled International Wrestling Revolution Group's Los Oficiales (Oficial 911, Oficial AK-47 and Oficial Fierro) in one of the featured matches on the Arena Naucalpan 35th Anniversary Show when the match ended in a double pinfall. In early 2013 Los Inferno Rockers finally defeated Los Psycho Circus, gaining some momentum in their ongoing feud. They repeated the feat at the 2012 Rey de Reyes show, seemingly escalating their feud towards a Lucha de Apuestas, or "bet match" where the teams would put their masks on the line. The Apuestas match never happened and Los Inferno Rockers were soon diverted from Los Psycho Circus. In later 2013 Devil Rocker left AAA and was replaced by Demon Rocker to remain a trio. a member of the Los Inferno Rockers stable. The team was phased out throughout 2014, with Demon Rocker taking over the "La Parka Negra" character. By early 2015 Machine Rocker no longer appeared on AAA shows either. On October 4, 2015 Machine Rocker was repackaged and introduced as "Taurus", signaling the end of Los Inferno Rockers as a unit.

=== El Nuevo Poder del Norte (2017–present) ===
At the 2017 Rey de Reyes show, Soul Rocker, Carta Brava Jr. and Mocho Cota Jr. (Tigre Cota using a different ring name) attacked Dr. Wagner Jr. and Psycho Clown only moments after the team had won their match. After the attack the trio stole the mask of Dr. Wagner Jr. At a subsequent AAA show the trio, now dubbed El Nuevo Poder del Norte were wrestling against the trio of Australian Suicide, Lanzeloth and Máscara de Bronce when Dr. Wagner Jr and Psycho Clown entered the ring to attack them. Moments later Murder Clown and Monster Clown came to the ring to even the sides, leading to the match becoming a 5-on-5 tag team match instead. Dr. Wagner Jr. pinned Mocho Cota Jr. but was left without his mask once more after the match was over. During the AAA show on April 14 Dr. Wagner Jr. was slated to face Psycho Clown in the main event, but the two were attacked by El Nuevo Poder del Norte, leading to a tag team match where Soul Rocker and Carta Brava Jr. defeated Dr. Wagner Jr. and Psycho Clown. Following their victory Soul Rocker and Carta Brava Jr. challenged their opponents to put their masks on the line in a Lucha de Apuestas, or "bet match". Both Dr. Wagner Jr. and Psycho Clown verbally accepted the match but no official date for the match was announced. A week later El Nuevo Poder del Norte demanded a match for the AAA World Trios Championship as part of the show. Faby Apache came out, but without her championship partners Mari Apache and El Apache. Moments later Faby Apache brought out Dr. Wagner Jr. and Psycho Clown as her replacement partners for a match against El Nuevo Poder del Norte. El Nuevo Poder del Norte won the match by pinning Faby Apache, making them the new champions.

== Championships and accomplishments ==
- Federación Internacional de Lucha Libre

- FILL Trios Championship (1 time) – with Kendor and Kendor Jr.

- International Wrestling Revolution Group

- IWRG Intercontinental Trios Championship (1 time, current) – with Mocho Cota Jr. and Súper Comando

- Lucha Libre AAA Worldwide

- AAA Northern Tag Team Championship (3 times) – with Rio Bravo (2), Tigre Cota (1)
- AAA World Trios Championship (3 times) – with Carta Brava Jr. and Mocho Cota Jr.

- Northeastern Mexico

- Northeastern Tag Team Championship (1 time) – with Rio Bravo

- Pro Wrestling Illustrated

- Ranked No. 210 of the 500 best singles wrestlers in the PWI 500 in 2013

== Luchas de Apuestas record ==
Winner (wager)	Loser (wager)	Location	Event	Date	Notes
Dr. Wagner Jr. and Psycho Clown (masks)	Nuevo Poder del Norte (masks) (Carta Brava Jr. and Soul Rocker)	Ciudad Juárez, Chihuahua	Verano de Escándalo	June 4, 2017	(Note: Match also included Monster Clown and Murder Clown)
Drago (mask)	Tito Santana (hair)	San Luis Potosí, San Luis Potosí	Héroes Inmortales XI	October 1, 2017	(Note: This was a four-team twelve-man Domo de la Muerte match.)
Los OGTs (hairs) (Averno, Chessman and Super Fly)	El Nuevo Poder del Norte (hairs) (Carta Brava Jr., Mocho Cota Jr. and Tito Santana)	Monterrey, Nuevo León	Verano de Escándalo	June 3, 2018	
