= Rey de Reyes (2011) =

2011 Lucha Libre AAA World Wide event

Rey de Reyes 2011
- Promotion: AAA
- Date: March 18, 2011
- City: Aguascalientes, Aguascalientes, Mexico
- Venue: Plaza de Toros Monumental
- Attendance: 17,000
- Tagline(s): Sólo uno dominerá este kaoz (Only one can dominate this chaos)

Pay-per-view chronology
| ← Previous; Guerra de Titanes | Next → Triplemanía XIX |

Rey de Reyes chronology
| ← Previous; 2010 | Next → 2012 |

Rey de Reyes 2011 (Spanish for "King of Kings") was a professional wrestling pay-per-view (PPV) event produced by AAA that took place on March 18, 2011, at Plaza de Toros Monumental in Aguascalientes, Aguascalientes, Mexico. The event was the 15th event produced under the Rey de Reyes name and also the 15th time that the Rey de Reyes tournament was held.

== Production ==
=== Background ===
Starting in 1997 and every year since then the Mexican Lucha Libre, or professional wrestling, company AAA has held a Rey de Reyes (Spanish for "King of Kings') show in the spring. The 1997 version was held in February, while all subsequent Rey de Reyes shows were held in March. As part of their annual Rey de Reyes event AAA holds the eponymious Rey de Reyes tournament to determine that specific year's Rey. Most years the show hosts both the qualifying round and the final match, but on occasion the qualifying matches have been held prior to the event as part of AAA's weekly television shows. The traditional format consists of four preliminary rounds, each a Four-man elimination match with each of the four winners face off in the tournament finals, again under elimination rules. There have been years where AAA has employed a different format to determine a winner. The winner of the Rey de Reyes tournament is given a large ornamental sword to symbolize their victory, but is normally not guaranteed any other rewards for winning the tournament, although some years becoming the Rey de Reyes has earned the winner a match for the AAA Mega Championship. From 1999 through 2009 AAA also held an annual Reina de Reinas ("Queen of Queens") tournament, but later turned that into an actual championship that could be defended at any point during the year, abandoning the annual tournament concept. The 2011 show was the 15th Rey de Reyes show in the series.

=== Storylines ===
The Rey de Reyes show featured six professional wrestling matches with different wrestlers involved in pre-existing, scripted feuds, plots, and storylines. Wrestlers were portrayed as either heels (referred to as rudos in Mexico, those that portray the "bad guys") or faces (técnicos in Mexico, the "good guy" characters) as they followed a series of tension-building events, which culminated in a wrestling match or series of matches.

== Results ==
| No. | Results | Stipulations | Times |
|---|---|---|---|
| 1 | Gran Apache, Mari Apache, Octagóncito and Pimpinela Escarlata defeated El Hijo del Tirantes, Mini Histeria, Sexy Star and Yuriko | Eight-person tag team match | 10:01 |
| 2 | Los Bizarros (Billy el Malo, Cibernético, Escoria, Nygma) (with Taboo) defeated Jack Evans, Joe Líder, La Parka and Nicho el Millonario | Eight-man tag team match | 18:57 |
| 3 | Los Perros del Mal (Damián 666, Halloween, El Hijo del Perro Aguayo and Super Crazy) defeated Potencia Mundial (Dr. Wagner Jr., Monster Clown, Murder Clown and Psycho Clown) | Eight-man tag team match | 11:00 |
| 4 | El Zorro (c) (with Jennifer Blake) defeated Charly Manson (with Billy el Malo) | Singles match for the AAA Mega Championship | 13:39 |
| 5 | Heavy Metal defeated Electroshock | Best two-out-of-three falls Bull Terrier match: Match #5 in the best-of-five Lucha de Apuesta, hair-vs-hair series | 07:26 |
| 6 | Extreme Tiger defeated El Mesías, L.A. Park and Carlito Caribbean Cool: First and second elimination: El Mesías and L.A. Park were both counted out; Third elimination: Extreme Tiger pinned Carlito Caribbean Cool | 2011 Rey de Reyes final four-way elimination match | 23:29 |
(c) / – the champion(s) heading into the match
