= Triplemanía XIX =

2011 Lucha Libre AAA World Wide event

- Promotional poster for the event, featuring various AAA wrestlers
- Promotion: AAA
- Date: June 18, 2011
- City: Mexico City, Mexico
- Venue: Palacio de los Deportes
- Attendance: 17,900

Pay-per-view chronology
← Previous; Rey de Reyes	Next → Verano de Escándalo

Triplemanía chronology
← Previous; XVIII	Next → XX

Triplemanía XIX was a professional wrestling pay-per-view (PPV) event produced by the AAA promotion, which took place on June 18, 2011 at the Palacio de los Deportes ("Sports Palace") in Mexico City, Mexico. The event was the nineteenth annual Triplemanía, which is AAA's biggest show of the year. The event featured performers from American promotion Total Nonstop Action Wrestling (TNA) for the second year in a row. The event featured eight matches and was headlined by the culmination of the seven–month storyline rivalry between L.A. Park and El Mesías in a Luchas de Apuestas, or "bet match", where Park put his mask and El Mesías his hair on the line. It also featured the crowning of the first ever AAA Latin American and AAA World Trios Champions. At the event, Octagón, who has been a part of AAA since the promotion was founded in 1992, became the fifth inductee into the AAA Hall of Fame.

== Production ==
=== Background ===
In early 1992 Antonio Peña was working as a booker and storyline writer for Consejo Mundial de Lucha Libre (CMLL), Mexico's largest and the world's oldest wrestling promotion, and was frustrated by CMLL's very conservative approach to professional wrestling, specifically the style of wrestling known as Lucha Libre (Spanish for "freestyle wrestling"). He joined forced with a number of younger, very talented wrestlers who felt like CMLL was not giving them the recognition they deserved and decided to split from CMLL to create Asistencia Asesoría y Administración, later known simply as "AAA" or Triple A. After making a deal with the Televisa television network AAA held their first show in April 1992. The following year Peña and AAA held their first Triplemanía event, building it into an annual event that would become AAA's Super Bowl event, similar to the WWE's WrestleMania being the biggest show of the year. The 2011 Triplemanía was the 19th year in a row AAA held a Triplemanía show and the 24th overall show under the Triplemanía banner.

=== Storylines ===
The Triplemanía XIX show featured eight professional wrestling matches with different wrestlers involved in pre-existing scripted feuds, plots and storylines. Wrestlers were portrayed as either heels (referred to as rudos in Mexico, those that portray the "bad guys") or faces (técnicos in Mexico, the "good guy" characters) as they followed a series of tension-building events, which culminated in a wrestling match or series of matches.

The year between Triplemanía XVIII and Triplemanía XIX consisted of the ongoing storyline war between the técnicos representing the promotion itself and the rudos of the stable La Sociedad ("The Society"), which was formed in the summer of 2010, when La Legión Extranjera ("The Foreign Legion") formed an alliance with Los Perros del Mal ("The Evil Dogs"), Los Maniacos ("The Maniacs") and La Milicia ("The Militia"). The AAA side, often called Legado AAA ("The AAA Legacy") or Ejército AAA ("The AAA Army"), was led by the promotion's president Joaquín Roldán, while his son Dorian Roldán was in charge of La Sociedad along with Konnan, the leader of La Legión Extranjera. In October 2010, Cibernético left Legado AAA, after feeling betrayed by his friends and re–formed his old group Los Bizarros as a third outside group, which was neither part of AAA nor La Sociedad.

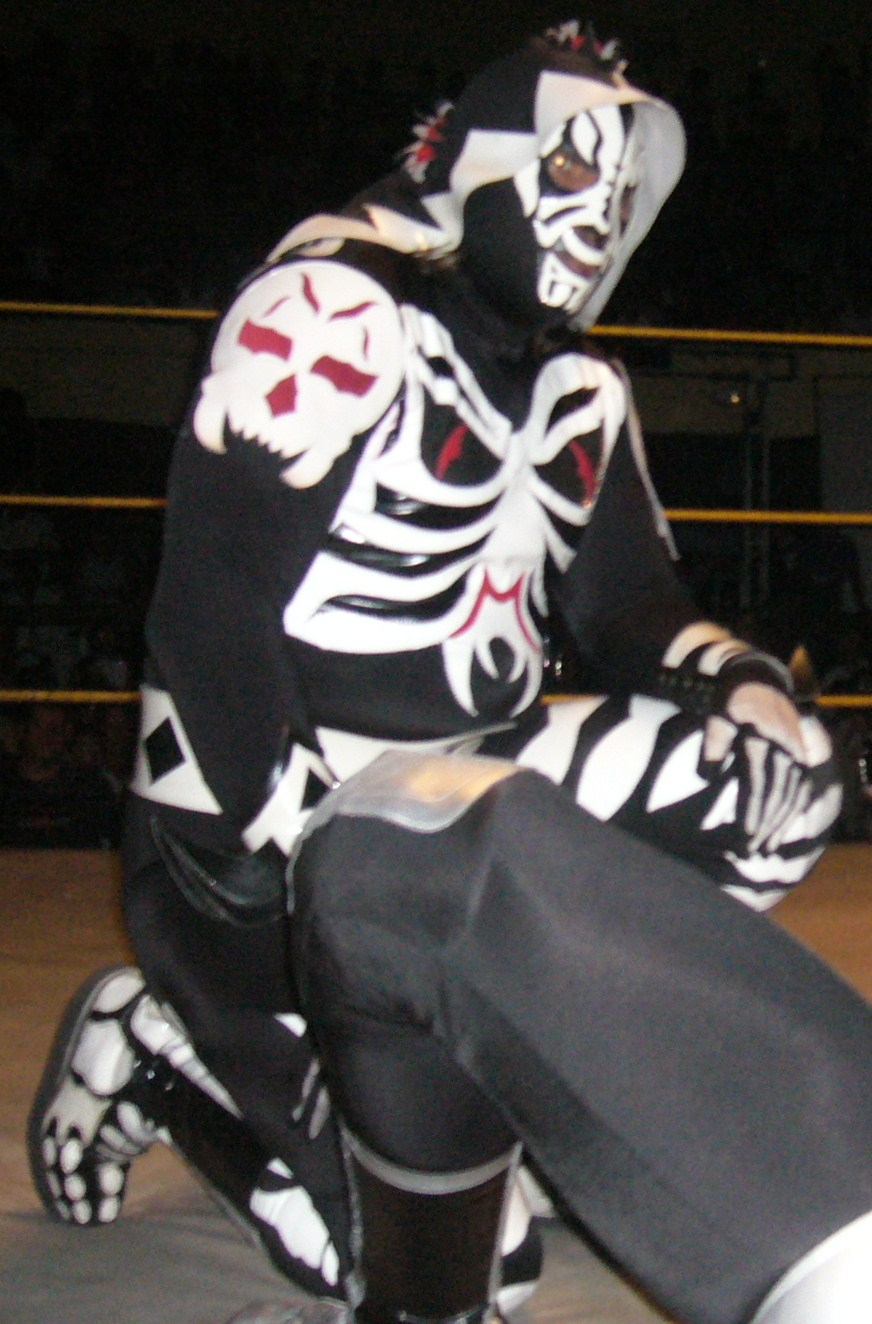
L.A. Park wearing the trademark mask he put on the line at Triplemanía XIX

On November 22, 2010, La Sociedad member L.A. Park returned to AAA, after spending several weeks wrestling in the United States, to find out that the group's leader Konnan had chosen his longtime La Legión Extranjera stablemate El Zorro as the next challenger for Dr. Wagner Jr.'s AAA Mega Championship. Trying to appease Park, Konnan promised him the next shot at the title, provided that he took out one of AAA's top técnicos, El Mesías. Later that night Park first bloodied El Mesías with a steel chair and then pinned him with a low blow in a six-man tag team match. On December 5 at Guerra de Titanes, L.A. Park and El Mesías faced each other in a match, which turned into a brawl, during which both were covered in blood and Park's trademark mask was torn apart, completely revealing his blood covered face. In the end, Park managed to pick up the win after another low blow, multiple shots with a steel chair and an illegal Martinete. However, Park's hopes of receiving a shot at the AAA Mega Championship were delayed, when at the same event El Zorro defeated Dr. Wagner Jr. to become the new champion. Konnan's decision to hand the next title shot to El Zorro's blood rival Charly Manson instead of Park, caused dissension within La Sociedad, just what Konnan wanted to avoid by not having the stablemates wrestle each other. Park then stated that after he won the Rey de Reyes tournament, Konnan would be forced to give him a title shot or face the consequences. On February 19, 2011, Park reiterated his point by assaulting and bloodying El Mesías backstage, after he had qualified for the finals of Rey de Reyes. On February 28, Park himself entered the tournament and defeated Dr. Wagner Jr., Halloween and Nicho el Millonario in his semifinal match. The finals of the tournament, a four-way match between Park, El Mesías, Carlito Caribbean Cool and Extreme Tiger took place on March 18 at the Rey de Reyes pay-per-view. Park and El Mesías were both eliminated from the match after brawling with each other to a double countout, leading to a win for AAA representative Extreme Tiger. After weeks of more hostilities between the two, including Park performing a Martinete on Mesías on the entrance stage, Mesías powerbombing Park through a table for a win in a six-man tag team match and the two brawling to a no contest due to neither being able to continue the match, on May 18, El Mesías made a challenge, which Park accepted, for a Lucha de Apuestas, or "bet match", at Triplemanía XIX, where the loser would either lose his mask or have his hair shaved off. Park later added to the stakes of the match by announcing that he would retire, should he lose his mask.

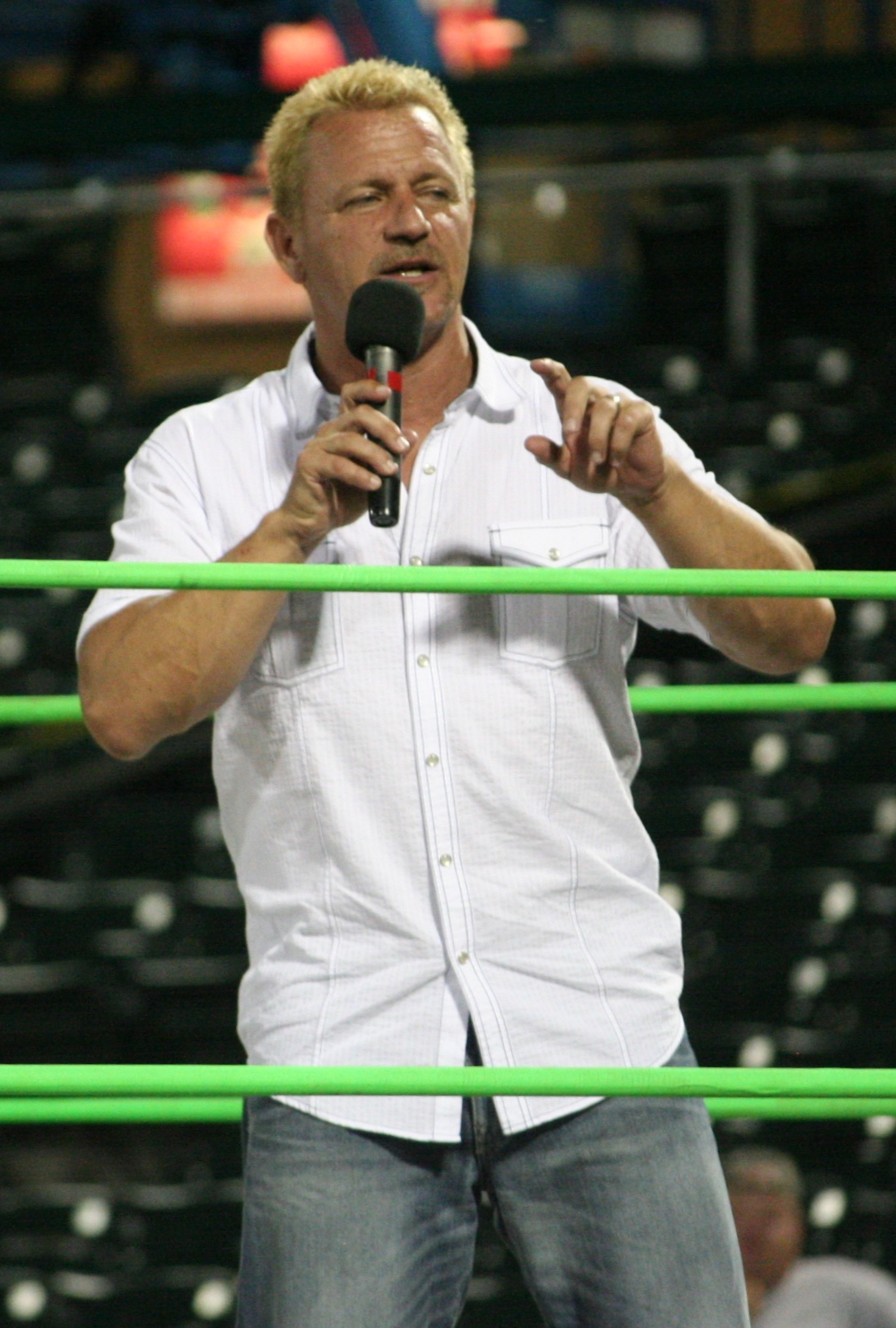
Jeff Jarrett, the founder of TNA and number one contender to the AAA Mega Championship at Triplemanía XIX

After working for AAA for over a decade, El Zorro finally managed to win the AAA Mega Championship for the first time on December 5, 2010, at Guerra de Titanes by defeating Dr. Wagner Jr. with help from his La Sociedad stablemates. Meanwhile, El Zorro's La Sociedad stablemate L.A. Park had earned himself a shot at the AAA Mega Championship, but Konnan, wanting to avoid dissension within his group, denied him his shot and instead named El Zorro's longtime rival Charly Manson the number one contender at Rey de Reyes. After successfully defending the title against Manson, El Zorro, having caught wind of Park's intention of going for his title, seemingly started interfering in Park's matches under his old mask, costing him back–to–back multi–man tag team matches at the April 27 and 30 TV tapings. It would later be revealed that the attacker had actually been Charly Manson, who had been sent by Cibernético to cause dissension within the ranks of La Sociedad. El Zorro, who is known as "El Profeta de la Lucha Libre" ("The Prophet of Wrestling") and as part of his character has made many accurate prophecies throughout the years, caused even more headache for Konnan by beginning to prophesize of the fall of a dictator, which he interpreted as meaning himself.

Meanwhile, La Sociedad co–leader Dorian Roldán struck deal with the founder of American promotion Total Nonstop Action Wrestling (TNA), Jeff Jarrett, to bring wrestlers from his promotion to AAA to help him take over the promotion from his father Joaquín Roldán and mother Marisela Peña Roldan. Konnan, however, was against the idea of his former employer coming to AAA and believed that Roldán had made a mistake. Jarrett and fellow TNA worker Abyss arrived to AAA on May 18 for a confrontation with Konnan and La Sociedad. In the end, Konnan and Jarrett revealed that they were in fact on the same page with each other and turned on El Zorro, along with L.A. Park, with Konnan announcing that Jarrett would be challenging for his AAA Mega Championship at Triplemanía XIX. After witnessing this turn of events, Marisela Peña Roldan finally decided that his son had gone too far and fired him from AAA, which led to Dorian proclaiming that with TNA he would revolutionize lucha libre and eventually the letters AAA would be replaced by TNA. As part of the TNA invasion, it was announced that at Triplemanía XIX TNA Knockouts Angelina Love, Mickie James and Velvet Sky would team with La Sociedad's Sexy Star in an eight-woman tag team match against Cynthia Moreno, Faby Apache, AAA Reina de Reinas Champion Mari Apache and Lolita, Rob Van Dam would face Dr. Wagner Jr. for the newly created AAA Latin American Championship and Abyss and Mr. Anderson would challenge Extreme Tiger and Jack Evans for the AAA World Tag Team Championship in a steel cage match.

Since their formation in December 2007, Los Psycho Circus (Monster Clown, Murder Clown and Psycho Clown) had not lost a single match, with AAA claiming that their win streak had reached over 600 victories. During the fall of 2010, Los Psycho Circus were engulfed in a war with the many variations of Los Perros del Mal, with Damián 666, Halloween and the group's leader El Hijo del Perro Aguayo being the most prominent Perros during the feud. After several matches between the two groups went to either a no contest or a countout, they were booked to face each other on December 5 at Guerra de Titanes in a steel cage weapons match, where Los Perros del Mal was represented by Damián 666, Halloween and X-Fly. In the end of the match, Halloween and Murder Clown were left in the cage, when someone wearing a Monster Clown mask ran out, climbed up the cage and prevented Murder Clown from escaping the cage, dropping him down to the mat and allowing Halloween to escape the cage, handing Los Psycho Circus their first ever loss. After the match, the man unmasked himself to reveal El Hijo del Perro Aguayo, who had been sidelined in October with a knee injury with reports stating that he would have to stay out of the ring for the rest of the year. The feud between the two groups continued at March's Rey de Reyes, where Los Perros del Mal, represented by Aguayo, Damián 666, Halloween and Super Crazy, was once again victorious in a match against Los Psycho Circus and Dr. Wagner Jr., the alliance known as Potencia Mundial ("World Power"). The feud also spread out to independent promotions International Wrestling Revolution Group (IWRG) and Perros del Mal Producciones (PdM); in IWRG, the groups feuded over the IWRG Intercontinental Trios Championship, which Los Psycho Circus successfully defended against Los Perros, while in PdM, the two groups faced each other in a Masks vs. Hairs steel cage match, which ended with Super Crazy having his hair head shaved off. In May 2011, AAA announced that the promotion was going to crown their first ever World Trios Champions and started a tournament with the finals being held at Triplemanía XIX. Los Psycho Circus advanced to the finals by defeating La Maniarquía (Chessman, Silver King and Último Gladiador) and The Black Family (Dark Cuervo, Dark Espíritu and Dark Ozz), while Los Perros del Mal advanced by defeating Real Fuerza Aérea (Aero Star, Argenis and Laredo Kid) and Los Bizarros (Charly Manson, Cibernético and Escoria) to set up a grudge match for the AAA World Trios Championship at Triplemanía XIX.

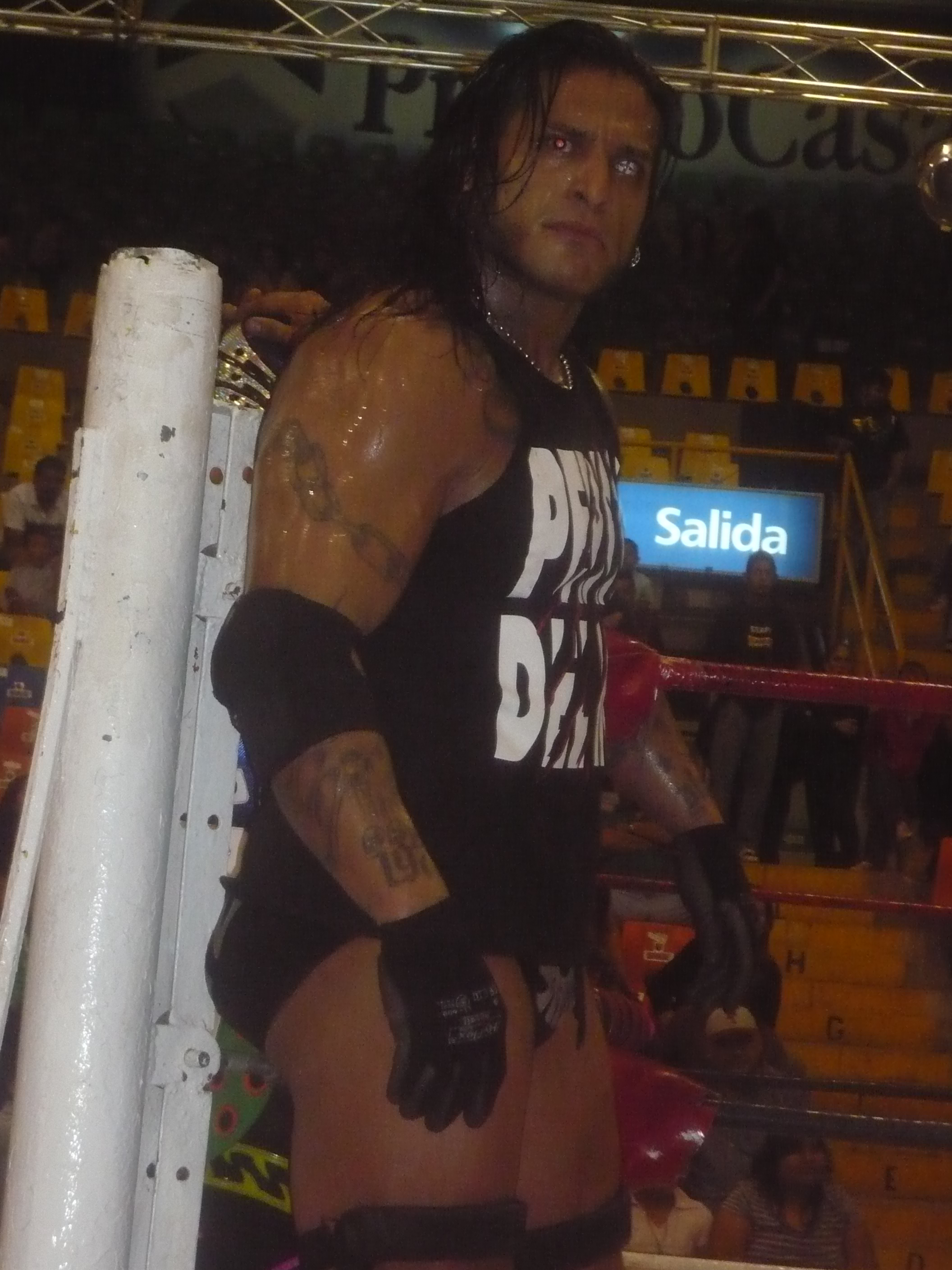
Cibernético, the leader of Los Bizarros

During the early stages of the war between AAA and La Sociedad, Cibernético was one of the top técnicos fighting for AAA. On October 1, 2010, at Héroes Inmortales IV, he was scheduled to team up Heavy Metal, La Parka and Octagón against a team of La Sociedad representatives, but prior to the match Konnan announced that Cibernético had decided to turn his back on AAA and join his team instead. AAA bought Konnan's claim and replaced Cibernético and Octagón, who was injured in a backstage assault by someone resembling Cibernético, in the match with Dark Ozz and Dark Cuervo. However, in the end Cibernético interfered in the match and helped AAA pick up the win. Afterwards, Cibernético, upset with AAA and in particular his friend La Parka for believing he had turned on the company, decided to re–form his old group Los Bizarros with Amadeus, Escoria, Nygma and Taboo. Cibernético made clear that even though Los Bizarros were no longer with AAA, they were not part of La Sociedad either, solidifying the group's status as tweeners. He also tried to recruit his friend El Mesías to join the group, but he decided to stay out of the war of words between his two friends. On November 22, the feud between Cibernético and La Parka turned physical, when Los Bizarros ran out to save El Mesías from a beatdown at the hands of La Sociedad, without making the save for La Parka and Jack Evans. When Parka confronted Cibernético, he was laid out with a stunner, after which Los Bizarros beat him down and Cibernético ripped his mask off his face. The first major battle between Cibernético and La Parka took place on December 5, 2010, at Guerra de Titanes, where Parka teamed up with Dark Espíritu, Extreme Tiger and Jack Evans to defeat Cibernético, Escoria, Nygma and Taboo. After the match, Los Bizarros once again beat down La Parka, after which Cibernético admitted that while Super Fly had been outed as the man who had attacked Octagón prior to Héroes Inmortales IV, he was in fact the one who had orchestrated the attack, meaning that Parka had been right about him all along. He then introduced the returning Charly Manson, who had most recently worked for rival promotion Consejo Mundial de Lucha Libre (CMLL), as the newest member of Los Bizarros. The group's lineup would be finalized a couple of months later with the addition of Billy el Malo, who jumped to Los Bizarros from La Sociedad. Cibernético and La Parka continued their heated rivalry the following months during which it was implied that Cibernético had assaulted and hospitalized Parka's three-year-old son, his own godson, with a broken leg and even provided X-rays, which he used to taunt Parka with. At March's Rey de Reyes, Los Bizarros, represented by Cibernético, Billy el Malo, Escoria and Nygma defeated La Parka, Jack Evans, Joe Líder and Nicho el Millonario, after which Cibernético threatened to light Parka on fire, before being driven out of the ring by Nicho. In May, La Parka formed his own group El Inframundo ("The Underworld") with Dark Ozz, Dark Cuervo, Dark Espíritu and the recently debuted Drago to counteract Los Bizarros. On May 13, La Parka challenged Cibernético to a battle of the groups at Triplemanía XIX, which he accepted. It was later revealed that for the event Parka's team would be joined by Octagón, looking for revenge for what happened to him nine months earlier. During the event, Octagón would also become the fifth inductee into the AAA Hall of Fame, following in the footsteps of Antonio Peña, Rey Mysterio Jr., Eddie Guerrero and Pepe Casas.

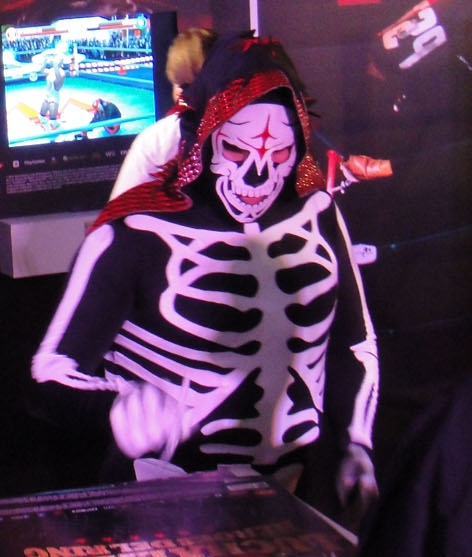
La Parka, the leader of El Inframundo

In September 2010, Silver King and Último Gladiador, two thirds of the stable Los Maniacos, announced they were joining La Sociedad, and although their stablemate Electroshock made no official announcement on whether or not he would be following them, he agreed to represent the group at Héroes Inmortales IV in order to get his hands on longtime rival Heavy Metal, who would represent AAA in the steel cage match between the two groups. After the event, during which Heavy Metal suffered an injury, which would sideline him for four months, Electroshock officially announced that he was not part of La Sociedad and urged Silver King and Último Gladiador to leave the group. At the November 18 event in Naucalpan he once again turned down an offer to join La Sociedad and was as a result beaten down by Silver King, Último Gladiador and La Milicia, turning him técnico in the process. When Heavy Metal returned from his injury on February 4, 2011, he and Electroshock entered a Best of Five series, with the loser having his hair shaved off. During the series, King and Gladiador tried to recruit Heavy Metal as the newest member of Los Maniacos and even interfered in several of the matches, but Heavy Metal made clear that he did not want to join them. The fifth match, a best two-out-of-three falls Bull Terrier match, took place on March 18 at Rey de Reyes, where Heavy Metal was victorious after a guitar shot, forcing Electroshock to have his hair shaved off. After the match both Electroshock and Heavy Metal were attacked by members of La Sociedad, bringing the former rivals together to fight a common enemy. Just two days later, Los Maniacos surprisingly lost the AAA World Tag Team Championship to Extreme Tiger and Jack Evans, after which Silver King and Último Gladiador were seemingly about to break up, but were brought back together by La Legión Extranjera member Chessman, with whom they would re–form Los Maniacos under the new name La Maniarquía. La Maniaquía was booked to settle their grudge with Electroshock and Heavy Metal at Triplemanía XIX in a Tables, Ladders, and Chairs match, for which the técnicos recruited a veteran of hardcore wrestling, Joe Líder, whose partner, Nicho el Millonario, La Maniarquía had injured, as the third member of their team.

== Event ==
Other on-screen personnel
Role:	Name:
Commentators	Andres Maroñas
Commentators	Jesús Zúñiga
Commentators	Leo Riaño
Commentators	Arturo Rivera
Referees	Pepe Casas
Referees	Piero
Referees	Copetes Salazar
Referees	Hijo del Tirantes

=== Pre–show ===
The event at Palacio de los Deportes opened with an eight-man tag team dark match, where La Milicia Extrema (Dark Dragon, Decnnis, Tigre Cota and Tito Santana) faced Fénix, Sugi San and Real Fuerza Aeréa members Aero Star and Argos. In the end, Argos managed to pick up the win for his team by pinning Dark Dragon following a double knee backbreaker.

=== Preliminary matches ===
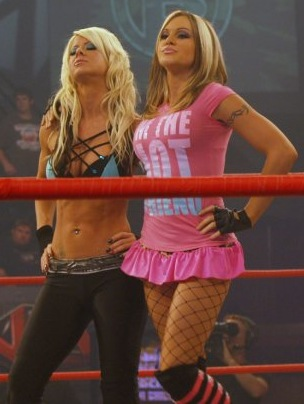
(Left to right) Angelina Love and Velvet Sky reunited to represent TNA at Triplemanía XIX

Triplemanía XIX opened with an in-ring segment, where Konnan first introduced announcer Arturo Rivera, who made his return after recently spending 20 days in coma as a result of a lung infection, and then proclaimed that the night would prove the superiority of American wrestling to Mexican lucha libre, before he was interrupted by Joaquin Roldán. At the conclusion of the segment, the two agreed that anyone who interfered in the evening's matches would be immediately suspended from AAA.

The opening match of Triplemanía XIX saw Sexy Star teaming with Angelina Love, Velvet Sky and TNA Women's Knockout Champion Mickie James against Cynthia Moreno, Faby Apache, Lolita and AAA Reina de Reinas Champion, Mari Apache. The match started with the rudos attacking the técnicos, isolating Moreno from her partners and quickly taking advantage in the match. Eventually Moreno, Mari Apache and Lolita all dove out of the ring onto Love, Sexy and Sky, leaving James and Faby Apache in the ring. In the end, James pinned Apache for the win with the Mickie–DT, after startling her with a kiss. After the match, the two teams brawled backstage.

After the opening match, Joaquin Roldán inducted Octagón into the AAA Hall of Fame.

In the second match of the pay-per-view, Electroshock, Heavy Metal and Joe Líder faced La Maniarquía, consisting of Chessman, Último Gladiador and Silver King, who in Mexico City is forced to wrestle under the ring name Silver Cain as a way of being able to wear his mask, in a Tables, Ladders and Chairs match. La Maniarquía was accompanied to the ring by their mascot Maniaquito and their La Sociedad stablemate, AAA World Mixed Tag Team Champion Jennifer Blake, while Heavy Metal was accompanied by his valet Nanyzh Rock, midget companion Lokillo and musician Charly Montana. While every one of them followed the earlier agreement between Joaquin Roldán and Konnan and did not interfere in the match, Joe Líder's partner Nicho el Millonario, seeking revenge on La Maniarquía, ran in and tried to replace Heavy Metal, who had been taken out of the match by Chessman, which led to Roldán coming out with security and having them remove Nicho from the arena. Soon afterwards, Heavy Metal returned to the match and threw Último Gladiador from the top rope through a cello, given to him by Montana, while Electroshock superbombed Chessman through a table. Heavy Metal followed up by performing a diving elbow drop on Gladiador, after which the técnico duo scored a double pin on their opponents to win the match.

In the third match, Cibernético, Billy el Malo, Charly Manson and Escoria of Los Bizarros faced La Parka, Dark Ozz and Drago of El Inframundo, who teamed with newly inducted Hall of Famer Octagón. At the end of the brawl, masked Los Bizarros member Taboo appeared at the top of the entrance ramp holding La Parka's ten-year-old son, who revealed on the microphone that Taboo was his uncle and thus La Parka's brother, the luchador formerly known as Lasser Boy. Meanwhile, in the ring, Cibernético took advantage of the distraction, hit Parka with a Garra Cibernetica and pinned him for the win. After the match, Cibernético revealed that Taboo had been the one who had helped him invade Parka's home and provided him with the X-rays of his godson's broken leg back in January. Taboo ended the segment by declaring Los Bizarros his new family.

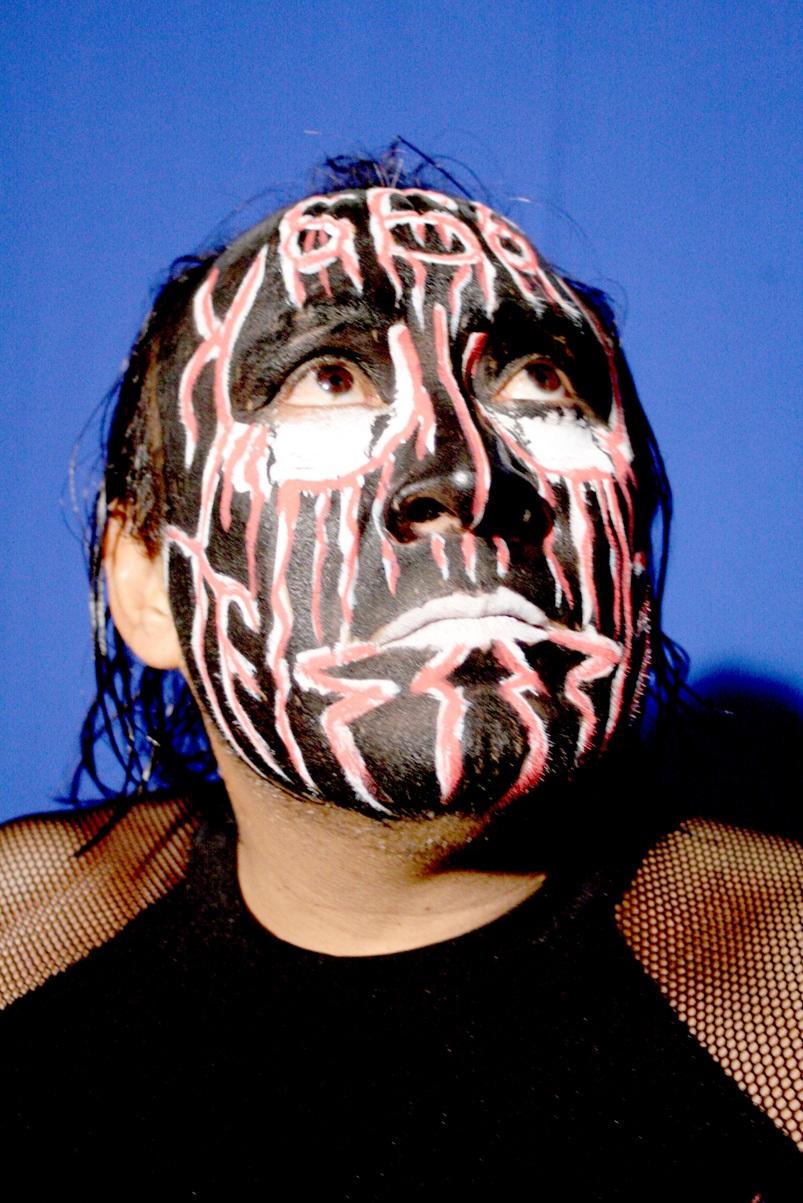
Damián 666, who was crowned one third of the first ever AAA World Trios Champions at the event

The fourth match of Triplemanía XIX saw Extreme Tiger and Jack Evans defending the AAA World Tag Team Championship in a steel cage match against TNA X Division Champion Abyss and TNA World Heavyweight Champion Mr. Anderson. The team whose both members managed to escape the cage would be declared the winner. Abyss and Anderson dominated the match early, but eventually Extreme Tiger was able to get away from Abyss and escape the cage. In a two–on–one advantage the TNA team was even more dominant and after more double–teaming, Mr. Anderson eventually climbed out of the cage. Left in the cage with Abyss, Evans managed to dodge his attack, use his speed to take him down and hit him with a 450° splash. Evans attempted to escape the cage, but Abyss stopped him, opened the bag he had entered the cage with and emptied its contents, thumbtacks, on the mat. Abyss attempted to chokeslam Evans off the ropes, but Evans escaped the hold by biting his fingers and then powerbombed him onto the tacks. Evans climbed to the top of the cage, but, instead of escaping, dove back into the ring onto Abyss with a crossbody. Immediately afterwards, Evans climbed back up and escaped the cage to successfully defend the AAA World Tag Team Championship.

In the fifth match Los Psycho Circus faced Los Perros del Mal in a tournament final to determine the first ever AAA World Trios Champions. In the match Los Perros del Mal was represented by Damián 666, Halloween and X-Fly, the same team that wrestled in the tournament's first round. In the semifinals of the tournament, El Hijo del Perro Aguayo had replaced X-Fly and he was supposed to do the same at Triplemanía XIX, but was forced to pull out of the event as a result of his body's adverse reaction to the medication given to him as part of his recent tumor treatment. Los Psycho Circus was accompanied to the match by their debuting mascot, Mini Clown. Just prior to the start of the match, the two teams agreed to make it an "Extreme match", which meant that much like their many previous matches against each other, this also featured various weapons used by both Los Psycho Circus and Los Perros del Mal. Eventually, Halloween stopped Psycho Clown's top rope hurricanrana attempt with a low blow and dropped him with a top rope Death Valley driver through a table for the win. With their win, Los Perros del Mal were crowned the first ever AAA World Trios Champions.

=== Main event matches ===
In the first semi–main event of the evening, La Sociedad member Jeff Jarrett challenged El Zorro for the AAA Mega Championship. Like the other matches involving TNA workers, the match was refereed by La Sociedad's own referee, Hijo del Tirantes, who showed bias towards Jarrett throughout the match. On several occasions Jarrett attempted to get El Zorro to submit with an ankle lock, the signature hold of his TNA rival Kurt Angle, but when he realized he was not going to succeed in his attempt, he took advantage of a distraction from his wife Karen and smashed El Zorro with his signature guitar, but to his surprise, only managed to get a two count out of the following pinfall. Jarrett then took a hold of El Zorro's kendo stick, hit him with it and then put it across his throat and performed his finishing maneuver The Stroke to become the new AAA Mega Champion and the first ever American to hold the title. Jarrett left the ring as fans in attendance started to fill it with bottles.

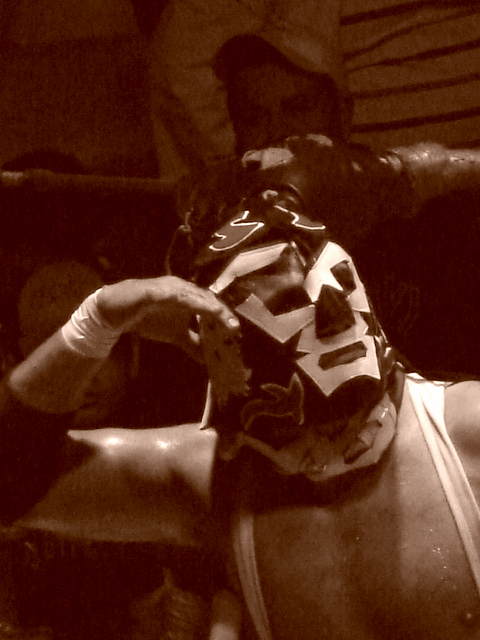
Dr. Wagner Jr., who defeated Rob Van Dam in the main event of Triplemanía XIX to become the first ever AAA Latin American Champion

The Mask vs. Hair match between L.A. Park and El Mesías, which had been billed as the top match of the event, took place next, with L.A. Park being accompanied to the ring by his son El Hijo de L.A. Park and Pierroth, neither of whom were working for AAA. Just like in their previous bout at December's Guerra de Titanes, both wrestlers were bloodied and L.A. Park's mask was torn to pieces during the brawl around the arena. With the match in his control following a Skull Bomb and a topé suicida, Park pulled out a table from under the ring, set it up inside the ring and climbed on top of it for his signature dance, but was then surprised by a diving spear through the table from El Mesías, which was however only good for a two count. El Mesías followed up with a double knee backbreaker and a Mesías Splash for another two count, before locking Park in a sharpshooter. Eventually, Park managed to reach the ropes, but El Mesías pulled him back to the center of the ring and re-applied the hold. Park feigned submission by lightly tapping El Mesías on the back, which led to him releasing the hold as he believed he had won the match. El Mesías climbed to the top rope to celebrate his "win" and when referee Piero tried to explain that Park had not in fact submitted, El Mesías swung his leg back and accidentally kicked him in the head. Park took advantage of the distraction, hit El Mesías with brass knuckles, made the pin and scored a three count to win the match. After the match, El Mesías had his hair shaved off with L.A. Park mocking Marisela Peña Roldan, who was seated in the front row. At this point the event had lasted over three and a half hours, which led to many in attendance leaving the arena after the match, not sticking around for the main event of the evening.

In the main event of the show, Dr. Wagner Jr. faced TNA worker Rob Van Dam to determine the first ever AAA Latin American Champion. Wagner, like L.A. Park, was accompanied to the ring by his son, independent worker Dr. Wagner III, with both him and Van Dam carrying the flags of their native countries. Van Dam used a steel chair on several occasions in the match, including kicking it in Wagner's face from the top rope. Eventually Wagner started a comeback with a top rope head-and-arm suplex suplex, before signaling for his finishing maneuver, the Wagner Driver. Wagner managed to hit the move, but Van Dam kicked out of the following pinfall. Wagner followed up with a rope hung DDT onto a steel chair, which was good enough for a three count. With the win Dr. Wagner Jr. became the first ever AAA Latin American Champion. The show ended with AAA's técnicos entering the ring to celebrate Wagner's and AAA's win over TNA and La Sociedad.

== Aftermath ==
At the press conference following the event, new AAA Latin American Champion Dr. Wagner Jr. put over his opponent for the night, Rob Van Dam, as a tough and unique opponent and stated that he was grateful for the opportunity to wrestle him. He also teased a possible match with Jeff Jarrett for the AAA Mega Championship and a Mask vs. Mask match against L.A. Park at Triplemanía XX, while also suggesting that now was the time for AAA to invade TNA. Meanwhile, Jarrett stated that Triplemanía XIX was only the beginning of TNA's invasion of AAA. TNA acknowledged Jarrett's win on the front page of their official website, calling him the "Heavyweight Champion of Mexico", not mentioning any of the other matches or even the name of the promotion.

In the days following the event, Joaquin Roldán reaffirmed that Nicho el Millonario had been suspended indefinitely for interfering in the Tables, Ladders and Chairs match. Konnan, meanwhile, gloated that, despite Abyss' and Anderson's failure to capture the AAA World Tag Team Championship, the TNA wrestlers as a whole had proven their superiority, just like he had promised. Konnan explained Van Dam's defeat in the main event by claiming that he had gotten injured during the match, but promised him a rematch with Wagner Jr. as soon as he had recovered. He also challenged Mari Apache to put her AAA Reina de Reinas Championship on the line against Mickie James.

Mickie James returned to AAA on July 9, this time defeating Mari Apache with a kiss and a Mickie–DT, before challenging her to a match for the Reina de Reinas Championship at Verano de Escándalo. After Wagner Jr. continued making challenges towards Jarrett, he was given a match for the AAA Mega Championship at Verano de Escándalo, but Konnan included L.A. Park in the match to make sure that the title stayed in La Sociedad. In late June and early July, Jack Evans became the first AAA contracted worker to work for TNA, when he made appearances on both their primary television show, Impact Wrestling, and at the Destination X pay-per-view, but once again AAA was never mentioned by name and it was simply announced that he had been working in Mexico the past years. Meanwhile, TNA workers Abyss, Samoa Joe and Scott Steiner made appearances in AAA, representing TNA and La Sociedad. Jarrett returned to Impact Wrestling on July 14, carrying the "Mexican Heavyweight Championship" belt, the AAA Mega Championship belt with the main plate, including the AAA letters, covered completely by a new white plate with a Mexican flag on it. After threatening to quit the promotion over his suspension, Nicho el Millonario returned to AAA on July 16, turning rudo and attacking Joe Líder, after he tried to calm him down as he was berating Joaquín Roldán.

=== Reception ===
Grita Radio analyst Jonathan Sánchez was highly critical of the performances of the TNA wrestlers, outside of Rob Van Dam, claiming that they did not show any quality and once again proved that American wrestling lacks the spark of Mexican lucha libre and Japanese puroresu, going as far as calling the match between El Zorro and Jeff Jarrett "terrible", claiming it was uncreative and bored the audience. He named the match between L.A. Park and El Mesías "by far the best so far this year", but claimed that the event as a whole fell short of expectations due to the lack of domestic competition in Mexico. Súper Luchas magazine's Eduardo Cano Vela was more positive in his review, taking his hat off for Triplemanía XIX, claiming that AAA had shown how to put together a major event.

== Results ==
No.	Results	Stipulations	Times
1^{D}	Aero Star, Argos, Fénix and Sugi San defeated La Milicia Extrema (Dark Dragon, Decnnis, Tigre Cota and Tito Santana)	Eight-man tag team match	—
2	La Legión Extranjera (Angelina Love, Mickie James, Sexy Star and Velvet Sky) defeated Cynthia Moreno, Faby Apache, Mari Apache and Lolita	Eight-woman tag team match	11:04
3	Electroshock, Heavy Metal (with Charly Montana, Lokillo and Nanyzh Rock) and Joe Líder defeated La Maniarquía (Chessman, Silver Cain and Último Gladiador) (with Jennifer Blake and Maniaquito)	Tables, Ladders, and Chairs match	15:42
4	Los Bizarros (Cibernético, Billy el Malo, Charly Manson and Escoria) defeated El Inframundo (La Parka, Dark Ozz and Drago) and Octagón	Eight-man tag team match	15:30
5	Extreme Tiger and Jack Evans (c) defeated Abyss and Mr. Anderson	Tag team steel cage match for the AAA World Tag Team Championship	12:05
6	Los Perros del Mal (Damián 666, Halloween and X-Fly) defeated Los Psycho Circus (Monster Clown, Murder Clown and Psycho Clown) (with Mini Clown)	Six-man tag team tournament final Extreme match for the inaugural AAA World Trios Championship	11:32
7	Jeff Jarrett (with Karen Jarrett) defeated El Zorro (c)	Singles match for the AAA Mega Championship	15:30
8	L.A. Park (with El Hijo de L.A. Park and Pierroth) defeated El Mesías	Lucha de Apuestas, mask vs. hair match	30:57
9	Dr. Wagner Jr. (with Dr. Wagner III) defeated Rob Van Dam	Singles match for the inaugural AAA Latin American Championship	16:44
(c) / – the champion(s) heading into the match; D / – this was a dark match

=== Inaugural AAA World Trios Championship Tournament bracket ===
1st Round; Sin Limite; May 18–26, 2011 (Aired May 29 – June 5)
The Black Family (Dark Cuervo, Dark Espíritu, and Dark Ozz)	Pinfall
La Milicia (Super Fly, Tigre Cota, and Tito Santana)	—
La Maniarquía (Chessman, Silver King, and Último Gladiador)	—
Los Psycho Circus (Monster Clown, Murder Clown, and Psycho Clown)	Pinfall
Los Perros del Mal (Damián 666, Halloween, and X-Fly)	Pinfall
Real Fuerza Aérea (Aero Star, Argenis, and Laredo Kid)	—
Los Bizarros (Charly Manson, Cibernético, and Billy el Malo)	Submission
Team IWRG (Cerebro Negro, Dr. Cerebro, and Eterno)	—

Semifinals; Sin Limite; June 9, 2011 (Aired June 19–26)
The Black Family	—
Los Psycho Circus	Pinfall
Los Perros del Mal (Damián 666, El Hijo del Perro Aguayo, and Halloween)	Pinfall
Los Bizarros (Charly Manson, Cibernético, and Escoria)	—

Final (Note: This was an Extreme match.); Triplemania XIX; June 18, 2011
Los Psycho Circus	—
Los Perros del Mal (Damián 666, Halloween, and X-Fly)	Pinfall
