= AAA World Trios Championship =

Professional wrestling championship

AAA World Trios Championship (Campeonato Mundial de Tercias AAA)

Details
- Promotion: Lucha Libre AAA Worldwide
- Date established: June 18, 2011
- Current champions: Los Perros del Mal (Daga, Angel and Berto)
- Date won: September 11, 2026
Statistics
- First champions: Los Perros del Mal (Damián 666, Halloween, and X-Fly)
- Most reigns: As trio (3 reigns): El Nuevo Poder del Norte; As individual (3 reigns): Averno; Carta Brava Jr.; Mocho Cota Jr.; Soul Rocker/Tito Santana; Chessman; Murder Clown; Psycho Clown
- Longest reign: Los Psycho Circus (Monster Clown, Murder Clown and Psycho Clown) (2nd reign, 846 days)
- Shortest reign: El Nuevo Poder del Norte (Carta Brava Jr., Mocho Cota Jr., and Tito Santana) (2nd reign, 33 days)
- Oldest champion: El Apache (57 years, 323 days)
- Youngest champion: El Hijo del Vikingo (21 years, 217 days)

The AAA World Trios Championship ("Campeonato Mundial de Tercias AAA" in Spanish) is a professional wrestling championship promoted by the Mexican promotion Lucha Libre AAA Worldwide (AAA), a sister promotion of WWE. It is contested for by teams of three wrestlers (often called "trios" in Mexico and "six-man tag teams" in the United States). The title was first announced on May 2011 with a tournament set to crown the inaugural champions at Triplemanía XIX. The title belts were designed and crafted by All Star Championship Belts. The current champions are Los Perros del Mal (Daga and Los Garza (Angel and Berto), who are in their first reign both, as a stable and individually. They won the title by defeating Los Psycho Circus (Dave the Clown, Murder Clown, Panic Clown, and Psycho Clown) on Night 1 of Triplemanía 34 on September 11, 2026; Dave, Murder, and Psycho defended the titles.

== Inaugural championship tournament ==
The inaugural AAA World Trios Champions were decided in an eight-team single-elimination tournament from May 18 to June 18, 2011. The winners of the tournament were Los Perros del Mal (Damián 666, Halloween, and X-Fly).

Tournament bracket

1st Round; Sin Limite; May 18–26, 2011 (Aired May 29 – June 5)
The Black Family (Dark Cuervo, Dark Espíritu, and Dark Ozz)	Pinfall
La Milicia (Super Fly, Tigre Cota, and Tito Santana)	—
La Maniarquía (Chessman, Silver King, and Último Gladiador)	—
Los Psycho Circus (Monster Clown, Murder Clown, and Psycho Clown)	Pinfall
Los Perros del Mal (Damián 666, Halloween, and X-Fly)	Pinfall
Real Fuerza Aérea (Aero Star, Argenis, and Laredo Kid)	—
Los Bizarros (Charly Manson, Cibernético, and Billy el Malo)	Submission
Team IWRG (Cerebro Negro, Dr. Cerebro, and Eterno)	—

Semifinals; Sin Limite; June 9, 2011 (Aired June 19–26)
The Black Family	—
Los Psycho Circus	Pinfall
Los Perros del Mal (Damián 666, El Hijo del Perro Aguayo, and Halloween)	Pinfall
Los Bizarros (Charly Manson, Cibernético, and Escoria)	—

Final (Note: This was an Extreme match.); Triplemania XIX; June 18, 2011
Los Psycho Circus	—
Los Perros del Mal (Damián 666, Halloween, and X-Fly)	Pinfall

== Reigns ==
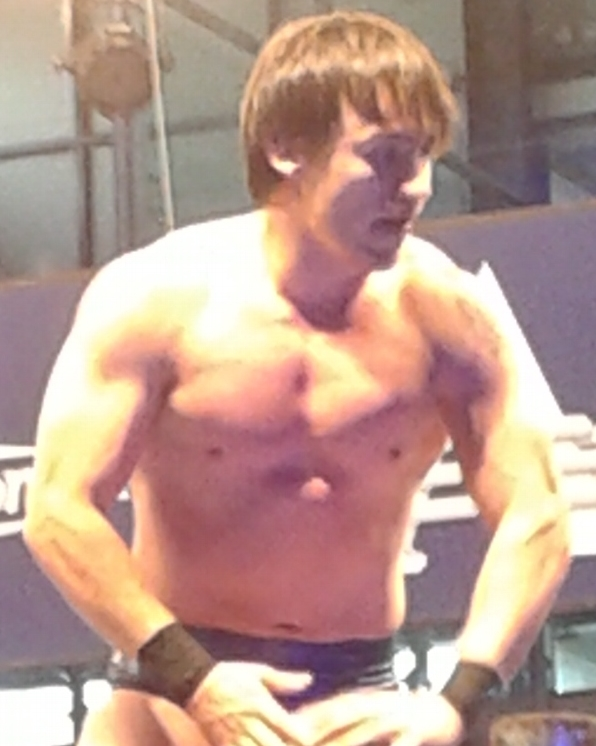
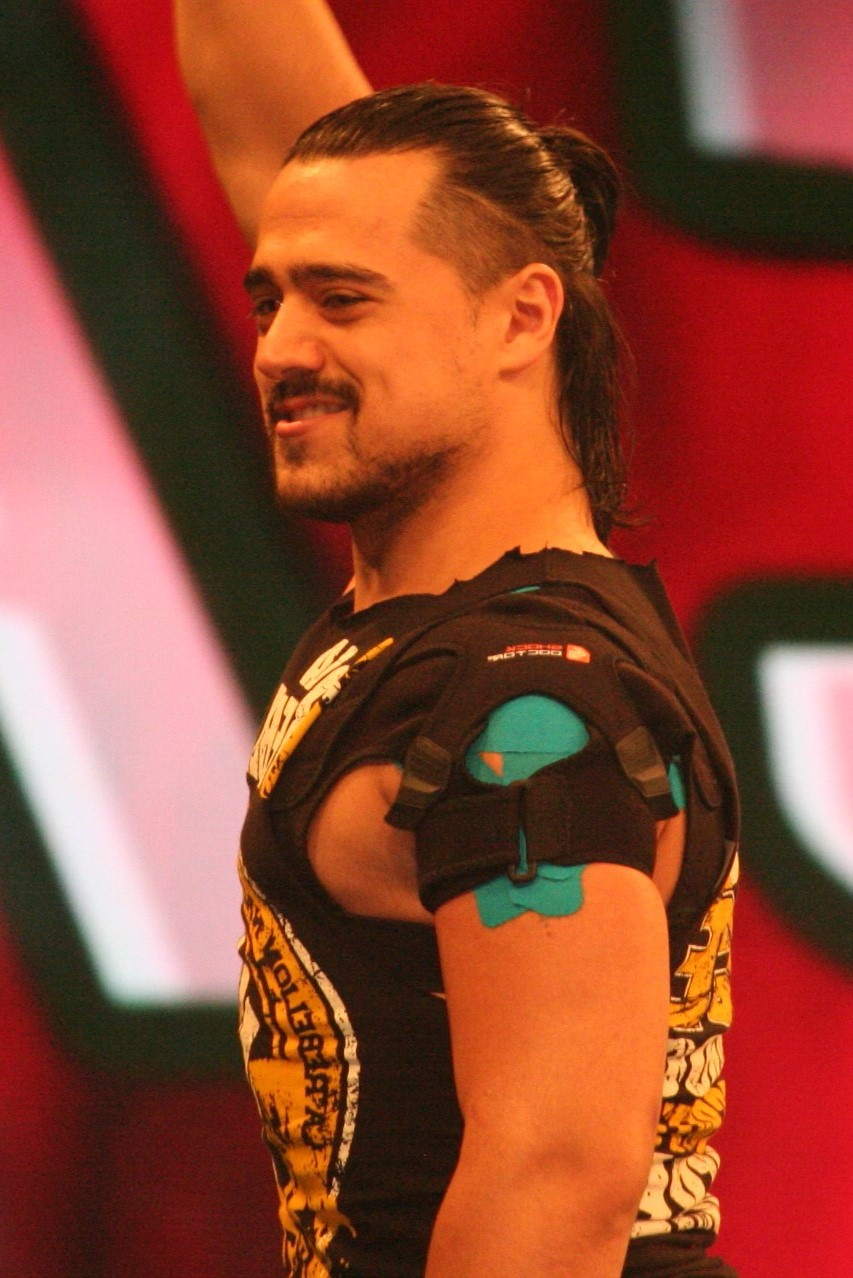
Current champions Los Perros del Mal (Daga, Angel, and Berto (not pictured)

Overall, there have been 20 reigns among 17 teams composed of 45 individual champions and three vacancies. Los Perros del Mal (Damián 666, Halloween, and X-Fly) were the inaugural champions. El Nuevo Poder del Norte (Carta Brava Jr., Mocho Cota Jr., and Soul Rocker/Tito Santana) have the most reigns among teams with three. Two intergender teams have won the titles: Los Apaches (El Apache, Faby Apache, and Mary Apache) and Los Mercenarios (La Hiedra, Rey Escorpion, Taurus, and Texano Jr.). Seven wrestlers are tied for the most individual reigns with three: Averno, Carta Brava Jr., Mocho Cota Jr., Soul Rocker/Tito Santana, Chessman, Murder Clown, and Psycho Clown. Los Psycho Circus (Monster Clown, Murder Clown and Psycho Clown) hold the longest reign at 846 days, while El Nuevo Poder del Norte (Carta Brava Jr., Mocho Cota Jr., and Tito Santana) hold the shortest reign at 33 days. El Apache is the oldest champion at 57 years and 323 days, while El Hijo del Vikingo is the youngest champion at 21 years and 217 days.

Los Perros del Mal (Daga and Los Garza (Angel and Berto) are the current champions in their first reign as a team and individually. They won the title by defeating Los Psycho Circus (Dave the Clown, Murder Clown, Panic Clown, and Psycho Clown) on Night 1 of Triplemanía 34 in Paradise, Nevada, United States, on September 11, 2026; Dave, Murder, and Psycho defended the titles.

Key
No.	Overall reign number
Reign	Reign number for the specific team—reign numbers for the individuals are in parentheses, if different
Days	Number of days held
Days recog.	Number of days held recognized by the promotion
+	Current reign is changing daily

No.	Champion	Championship change			Reign statistics			Notes	Ref.
No.	Champion	Date	Event	Location	Reign	Days	Days recog.	Notes	Ref.
Lucha Libre AAA Worldwide (AAA)
1	Los Perros del Mal (Damián 666, Halloween, and X-Fly)	June 18, 2011	Triplemanía XIX	Mexico City, Mexico	1	267	267	Defeated Los Psycho Circus (Monster Clown, Murder Clown, and Psycho Clown) in a Extreme match to become the inaugural champions.	
2	Los Psycho Circus (Monster Clown, Murder Clown, and Psycho Clown)	March 11, 2012	AAA	Ecatepec, Mexico	1	69	83		
3	El Consejo (El Texano Jr., Máscara Año 2000 Jr., and Toscano)	May 19, 2012	Sin Limite: Noche de Campeones	Chilpancingo, Guerrero, Mexico	1	275	273	Aired on June 2.	
4	Los Psycho Circus (Monster Clown, Murder Clown, and Psycho Clown)	February 18, 2013	Sin Límite	Irapuato, Guanajuato, Mexico	2	846	834	Aired on March 2.	
5	Los Hell Brothers (Averno, Chessman, and Cibernético)	June 14, 2015	Verano de Escándalo	Monterrey, Nuevo León, Mexico	1	206	206	This three way trios match also featured Holocausto (Electroshock, El Hijo de Pirata Morgan, and La Parka Negra).	
—	Vacated	January 6, 2016	—	—	—	—	—	Cibernético left AAA.	
6	Los Xinetez (Dark Cuervo, Dark Scoria, and El Zorro)	January 22, 2016	Sin Limite: Guerra de Titanes	Zapopan, Jalisco, Mexico	1	287	294	Defeated Electroshock, Garza Jr. and La Parka and El Hijo de Pirata Morgan, Hijo del Fantasma, and Taurus in a three way trios match to win the vacant titles. Aired on February 6.	
7	Los OGT (Averno, Chessman, and Ricky Marvin)	November 4, 2016	Sin Limite	Aguascalientes, Mexico	1 (2, 2, 1)	121	99	Won via disqualification, when Faby Apache fouled Chessman. Aired on November 26.	
8	Los Apaches (El Apache, Faby Apache, and Mary Apache)	March 5, 2017	AAA	Apizaco, Tlaxcala, Mexico	1	47	47	Faby Apache defeated Ricky Marvin in a Title vs. Career match to win the titles for Los Apaches. Had she lost, Los Apaches would have been forced to retire.	
9	El Nuevo Poder del Norte (Carta Brava Jr., Mocho Cota Jr., and Soul Rocker)	April 21, 2017	AAA	Tijuana, Baja California, Mexico	1	59	59	Defeated Faby Apache, Dr. Wagner Jr., and Psycho Clown. Wagner Jr. and Clown replaced El Apache and Mary Apache.	
—	Vacated	June 19, 2017	AAA	Nuevo Laredo, Tamaulipas, Mexico	—	—	—	El Vampiro Canadiense vacated the titles after a controversial finish to a title defense against Aero Star, Drago, and Raptor.	
10	El Nuevo Poder del Norte (Carta Brava Jr., Mocho Cota Jr., and Tito Santana)	October 1, 2017	Héroes Inmortales XI	San Luis Potosí, San Luis Potosí, Mexico	2	33	33	Defeated Aero Star, Drago, and Raptor to win the vacant titles.	
11	Los OGT (Averno, Chessman, and Super Fly)	November 3, 2017	AAA	Querétaro, Querétaro, Mexico	1 (3, 3, 1)	84	84		
12	El Nuevo Poder del Norte (Carta Brava Jr., Mocho Cota Jr., and Tito Santana)	January 26, 2018	Guerra de Titanes	Mexico City, Mexico	3	310	310		
13	Jinetes del Aire (El Hijo del Vikingo, Laredo Kid, and Myzteziz Jr.)	December 2, 2018	Guerra de Titanes	Aguascalientes, Aguascalientes, Mexico	1	244	244		
—	Vacated	August 3, 2019	Triplemanía XXVII	Mexico City, Mexico	—	—	—	Laredo Kid left Jinetes del Aire to focus on his singles career.	
14	Jinetes del Aire (El Hijo del Vikingo, Golden Magic/Octagón Jr., and Myzteziz Jr.)	August 3, 2019	Triplemanía XXVII	Mexico City, Mexico	1 (2, 1, 2)	638	644	Defeated El Nuevo Poder del Norte (Mocho Cota Jr., Carta Brava Jr., and Tito Santana) and Las Fresas Salvajes (Pimpinela Escarlata, Mamba, and Máximo) in a three-way trios match to win the vacant titles.	
15	Los Mercenarios (La Hiedra, Rey Escorpion, Taurus, and Texano Jr.)	May 2, 2021	AAA	San Pedro Cholula, Puebla, Mexico	1 (1, 1, 1, 2)	307	301	Despite not being involved in the title match, Taurus was recognized as champion via the Freebird rule. Texano Jr. left AAA during this reign. Aired on May 8.	
16	La Empresa (DMT Azul, Puma King, and Sam Adonis)	March 5, 2022	Gira Aniversario XXX	Ciudad Madero, Tamaulipas, Mexico	1	153	153	Villano III Jr. replaced La Hiedra in the title defense.	
17	Nueva Generación Dinamita (El Cuatrero, Forastero, and Sansón)	August 5, 2022	Verano de Escándalo	Aguascalientes City, Mexico	1	350	350		
18	Los Vipers (Abismo Negro Jr., Psicosis, El Fiscal, and Toxin)	July 21, 2023	Verano de Escándalo	Aguascalientes City, Mexico	1	485	485	Hijo de Máscara Año 2000 replaced El Cuatrero in the title defense. Despite not being in the title match, El Fiscal was later recognized as champion under the Freebird Rule. On February 28, 2024, Toxin left AAA but he continued to be recognized as champion.	
19	Los Psycho Circus (Dave the Clown, Murder Clown, Panic Clown, and Psycho Clown)	November 17, 2024	Origenes	Saltillo, Coahuila, Mexico	1 (1, 3, 1, 3)	663	663	This was a Steel Cage match. Despite not being in the title match, Psycho Clown was later recognized as champion under the Freebird Rule.	
20	Los Perros del Mal (Daga, Angel and Berto)	September 11, 2026	Triplemanía 34; Night 1	Paradise, Nevada, U.S.	1	57+	57+	Dave the Clown, Murder Clown, and Psycho Clown of the previous champions Los Psycho Circus defended the title.	

== Combined reigns ==
As of November 7, 2026.

†	Indicates the current champions

=== By team ===
Rank	Team	No. of reigns	Combined days	
Rank	Team	No. of reigns	Actual	Recognized by AAA
1	Los Psycho Circus (Monster Clown, Murder Clown, and Psycho Clown)	2	915	917
2	Los Psycho Circus (Dave the Clown, Murder Clown, Panic Clown, and Psycho Clown)	1	663	
3	Jinetes del Aire (El Hijo del Vikingo, Golden Magic/Octagón Jr., and Myzteziz Jr.)	1	638	644
4	Los Vipers (Abismo Negro Jr., Psicosis, El Fiscal, and Toxin)	1	485	
5	El Nuevo Poder del Norte (Carta Brava Jr., Mocho Cota Jr., and Soul Rocker/Tito Santana)	3	402	
6	Nueva Generación Dinamita (El Cuatrero, Forastero, and Sansón)	1	350	
7	Los Mercenarios (La Hiedra, Rey Escorpion, Taurus, and Texano Jr.)	1	307	301
8	Los Xinetez (Dark Cuervo, Dark Scoria, and El Zorro)	1	287	294
9	El Consejo (El Texano Jr., Máscara Año 2000 Jr., and Toscano)	1	275	273
10	Los Perros del Mal (Damián 666, Halloween, and X-Fly)	1	267	
11	Jinetes del Aire (El Hijo del Vikingo, Laredo Kid, and Myzteziz Jr.)	1	244	
12	Los Hell Brothers (Averno, Chessman, and Cibernético)	1	206	
13	La Empresa (DMT Azul, Puma King, and Sam Adonis)	1	153	
14	Los OGT (Averno, Chessman, and Ricky Marvin)	1	121	99
15	Los OGT (Averno, Chessman, and Super Fly)	1	84	
16	Los Perros del Mal (Daga, Angel and Berto)	1	57+	
17	Los Apaches (El Apache, Faby Apache, and Mary Apache)	1	47	

=== By wrestler ===
Rank	Wrestler	No. of reigns	Combined days	
Rank	Wrestler	No. of reigns	Actual	Recognized by AAA
1	Murder Clown	3	1,578	1,580
1	Psycho Clown	3	1,578	1,580
3	Monster Clown	2	915	917
4	El Hijo del Vikingo	2	882	888
4	Myzteziz Jr.	2	882	888
6	Dave the Clown	1	663	
6	Panic Clown	1	663	
8	Golden Magic/ Octagón Jr.	1	638	644
9	El Texano Jr.	2	582	574
10	Abismo Negro Jr.	1	485	
10	Psicosis	1	485	
10	El Fiscal	1	485	
10	Toxin	1	485	
14	Averno	3	411	389
14	Chessman	3	411	389
16	Carta Brava Jr.	3	402	
16	Mocho Cota Jr.	3	402	
16	Soul Rocker/Tito Santana	3	402	
19	El Cuatrero	1	350	
19	Forastero	1	350	
19	Sansón	1	350	
22	La Hiedra	1	307	301
22	Rey Escorpion	1	307	301
22	Taurus	1	307	301
25	Dark Cuervo	1	287	294
25	Dark Scoria	1	287	294
25	El Zorro	1	287	294
28	Máscara Año 2000 Jr.	1	275	273
28	Toscano	1	275	273
30	Damián 666	1	267	
30	Halloween	1	267	
30	X-Fly	1	267	
33	Laredo Kid	1	244	
34	Cibernético	1	206	
35	DMT Azul	1	153	
35	Puma King	1	153	
35	Sam Adonis	1	153	
38	Ricky Marvin	1	121	99
39	Super Fly	1	84	
40	Daga †	1	57+	
40	Angel †	1	57+	
40	Berto †	1	57+	
43	El Apache	1	47	
43	Faby Apache	1	47	
43	Mary Apache	1	47	

== See also ==
- List of current champions in Lucha Libre AAA Worldwide
- Tag team championships in WWE
