= Los Psycho Circus =

Professional wrestling group

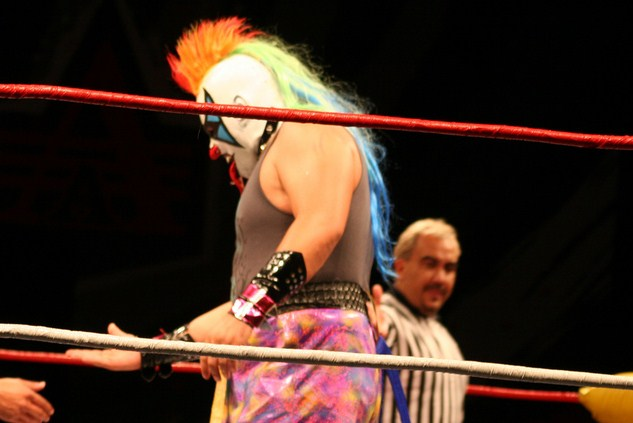
- Psycho Clown in March 2009

Stable
- Members: Psycho Clown; Murder Clown; Dave the Clown; Panic Clown
- Billed heights: Psycho Clown: 1.87 m (6 ft 1 1/2 in); Monster Clown: 1.90 m (6 ft 3 in); Murder Clown: 1.96 m (6 ft 5 in)
- Combined billed weight: 348 kg (767 lb)
- Billed from: "The Psycho Circus"
- Former members: Monster Clown; Mini Clown; Mini Psycho Clown; Mini Monster Clown; Mini Murder Clown; Pagano
- Debut: December 14, 2007
- Years active: 2007–2016; 2020–present

Los Psycho Circus is a Mexican técnico professional wrestling stable that performs in the Mexico City-based promotion Lucha Libre AAA Worldwide (AAA). The group consists of four enmascarado, or masked, wrestlers known under the ring names Psycho Clown, Murder Clown, Dave the Clown and Panic Clown. They are former three-time AAA World Trios Champions and were also the last holders of the Mexican National Atómicos Championship with Chessman. Los Psycho Circus is most known for an exaggerated undefeated streak since their debut in 2007, they are announced as having won over 600 matches. The streak came to an end in December 2010.

== History ==
Lucha Libre AAA Worldwide (AAA) has a long history of using clown based ring characters ever since the company was founded in 1992, most famously the group known as Los Payasos (Spanish for "The Clowns") that existed until 1999. AAA later tried to promote other clown trios such as Payasos del Mal ("Evil Clowns") in 2007. It was not until AAA took the wrestler who had worked as Aliens, Kronus (son of Brazo de Plata) and a third wrestler whose previous identity has not been revealed and turned them into Los Psycho Circus. Aliens became known as Zombie Clown, Kronus became Psycho Clown and the third man became known as Killer Clown.

Unlike previous clown characters who wore fabric masks Los Psycho Circus wore rubber masks with more horrific, twisted facial expressions, inspired by the movie Killer Klowns from Outer Space. Psycho Clown's mask features a foot high brightly colored Mohawk and a long plastic tongue, Zombie Clown's mask features rotting yellow teeth, skin blotches and a small blue tophat while Murder Clown's mask features vampire like fangs and a balding multicolored afro. Each of the wrestlers was given a backstory befitting their twisted and dark characters, complete with statements about the clowns "rejoicing in the pain of others" and "Violence without measure", a fabricated profile to help enhance their "evil" characters.

The team made their debut on December 14, 2007 during a show in Chilpancingo, Guerrero where they defeated Real Fuerza Aérea (Aero Star, Super Fly and Pegasso). Los Psycho Circus was physically larger than most of the AAA wrestlers and soon established themselves as a dominant force in the ring, booked to easily defeat a series of low card teams. While Los Psycho Circus was booked as Rudos (bad guys) they faced both tecnico (good guy) and rudo teams, defeating all opponents. Months after their debut AAA began to "augment" their record, announcing them with 5 more victories after every television taping, despite AAA not even holding five shows, let alone five shows featuring Los Psycho Circus. The exaggerated win streak soon became an integral part of the gimmick when they achieved 132 "victories" in their first year aiming to eclipse the most well known winning streak in professional wrestling, Bill Goldberg's 173 victories in a row. They made their first appearance at a major AAA show on March 16, 2008 when they defeated The Black Family (Dark Cuervo, Dark Ozz and Dark Escoria) on the 2008 Rey de Reyes event.

Over the next year Los Psycho Circus defeated such teams as the técnico team of El Ángel, Super Porky (Psycho Clown's father) and El Alebrije as well as the rudo team La Legión Extranjera (Kenzo Suzuki, Jack Evans and Teddy Hart) while remaining undefeated. Los Psycho Circus developed a rivalry with The Dark Family, teaming with Chessman to even the sides between the two teams. On January 18, 2009 Los Psycho Circus and Chessman defeated The Dark Family (Dark Cuervo, Dark Escoria, Dark Espiritu and Dark Ozz) to win the Mexican National Atómicos Championship. The team's run with the Atómicos titles ended after just 8 days when AAA Commissioner Vampiro stripped Chessman and Los Psycho Circus of the titles because they had attacked him during a show the night before. Los Psycho Circus also wrestled at Triplemanía XVII, although they appeared in the pre-show dark match and not during the actual Pay-Per-View event. They team defeated Real Fuerza Aérea (Laredo Kid, Super Fly and Aero Star) in a sub-three minute match.

In August 2009 AAA announced that Zombie Clown had been renamed "Monster Clown" and Killer Clown had been renamed "Murder Clown" due to copyright issues over the original names. The newly renamed Psycho Circus kept their winning streak alive as they defeated La Yakuza (El Oriental, Kenzo Suzuki and Sugi San) in the opening match of the 2009 Verano de Escándalo. In September 2009 their win streak was announced as having reached 461 victories, promoting Los Psycho Circus to demand to face the "top stars", stating that AAA promoter Joaquin Roldan needed to pay more attention to them.

In the winter of 2009 Los Psycho Circus turned technico and began siding with Cibernético in his feud with Konnan and La Legión Extranjera teaming with him in eight-man matches against La Legión. During a match on January 17, 2010 La Legión fought Los Psycho Circus and Cibernético in a match that for the first time in their AAA career saw Los Psycho Circus' masks torn and two of them bleeding during the match. At the 2010 Rey de Reyes event Los Psycho Circus serve as Lumberjacks during a Lumberjack match where they kept La Legión from interfering in the match, allowing Cibernético to pin Konnan. During the summer of 2010 it was announced that Los Psycho Circus ' win streak had reached 600 victories. On October 31, 2010, Los Psycho Circus formed a new alliance named Potencia Mundial (World Power) with AAA Mega Champion Dr. Wagner Jr. On December 5, 2010, at Guerra de Titanes Los Psycho Circus' long undefeated streak came to an end, when Los Perros del Mal (Damián 666, Halloween and X-Fly) handed them their first ever loss in a steel cage weapons match, thanks to an interference from the leader of Los Perros, El Hijo del Perro Aguayo.

On January 2, 2011, Murder Clown and Psycho Clown represented AAA in the Guerra de Empresas, a battle between different promotions, hosted by International Wrestling Revolution Group (IWRG). After defeating Team Desastre Total Ultraviolento (Crazy Boy and Joe Líder), Los Psycho Circus advanced to the finals, where they defeated Team Los Perros del Mal (Super Crazy and X-Fly) to win the tournament. On April 24, Los Psycho Circus defeated Los Maniacos (Joe Líder, Silver King and Último Gladiador), Los Oficiales (Oficial 911, Oficial AK-47 and Oficial Fierro) and Los Perros del Mal (Bestia 666, Damián 666 and X-Fly) in a four–way elimination steel cage match to win the IWRG Intercontinental Trios Championship at IWRG's Guerra de Empresas show. The feud between Los Psycho Circus and Los Perros del Mal continued on May 29 at Perros del Mal Producciones' third anniversary show, where Los Psycho Circus was victorious in a six-man tag team steel cage Masks vs. Hairs match and, as a result, Super Crazy, the last man left in the cage, was forced to have his head shaved bald. The feud continued at Triplemanía XIX, where Damián 666, Halloween and X-Fly defeated Los Psycho Circus in a tournament final to become the first ever AAA World Trios Champions. At the event, Los Psycho Circus also debuted their own mascot, Mini Clown. On July 16, AAA debuted the mini versions of Los Psycho Circus, Mini Monster Clown, Mini Murder Clown and Mini Psycho Clown. On July 31 at Verano de Escándalo, Los Psycho Circus faced Los Perros del Mal in a steel cage match, where the last person left in the cage would lose either his hair or mask. The match ended with Psycho Clown escaping the cage, leaving X-Fly inside and forcing him to have his hair shaved off. On August 28, Los Psycho Circus lost the IWRG Intercontinental Trios Championship to Bestia 666, Damián 666 and X-Fly of Los Perros del Mal in a four team steel cage match, which also included Los Temerarios (Black Terry, Durok and Machin) and Los Villanos (Kortiz, Ray Mendoza, Jr. and Villano IV). On October 9 at Héroes Inmortales, Los Psycho Circus and Los Perros del Mal ended their year long rivalry, when the clowns defeated Damián 666, Halloween and Nicho el Millonario in a Masks vs. Hairs steel cage match to take their hairs. After a five-month break from the rivalry, Los Psycho Circus defeated Damián 666, Halloween and X-Fly of Los Perros del Mal on March 11, 2012, to win the AAA World Trios Championship. They lost the title to El Consejo (Máscara Año 2000 Jr., Texano Jr. and Toscano) on May 19, 2012. Los Psycho Circus regained the title from El Consejo on February 18, 2013. At Triplemanía XXI Los Psycho Circus represented AAA against the La Liga Wrestling-Total Nonstop Action Wrestling team of José "Monster Pain" Torres, Matt Morgan and Jeff Jarrett. However, they lost the contest and received a beat down with the WWL World Heavyweight Championship belt afterwards. Los Psycho Circus lost the AAA World Trios Championship to Los Hell Brothers (Averno, Chessman and Cibernético) on June 14, 2015, at Verano de Escándalo.

On October 2, 2016, at Héroes Inmortales X, Monster and Murder Clown turned on Psycho Clown and formed a new partnership with his rival Pagano.

== In other media ==
All three members Los Psycho Circus are playable characters in the video game Lucha Libre AAA: Héroes del Ring, which was released at the end of 2010. Although the game does not feature tag team or trios matches and as such do not appear collectively as "Los Psycho Circus". Although in both técnico and rudo Story Mode, they appear in handicap matches with different members in each mode. Tecnico features Psycho Clown and Killer Clown/Murder Clown while Rudo features Psycho Clown and Zombie Clown/Monster Clown.

== Championships and accomplishments ==
- Lucha Libre AAA Worldwide

- AAA Latin American Championship (1 time) – Psycho Clown
- AAA World Mini-Estrella Championship (1 time) – Mini Psycho Clown
- AAA World Tag Team Championship (1 time) – Monster Clown and Murder Clown
- AAA World Trios Championship (3 times)
- Mexican National Atómicos Championship (1 time) – with Chessman

- International Wrestling League

- IWL Trios Championship (2 times)

- International Wrestling Revolution Group

- IWRG Intercontinental Trios Championship (1 time)
- Guerra de Empresas (January 2011) – Murder Clown and Psycho Clown

- Invasion RCH

- RCH Heavyweight Championship (1 time, current) – Psycho Clown

- Box y Lucha Magazine

- AAA Trio of the Year (2012)

- Wrestling Observer Newsletter

- Worst Match of the Year (2015) vs. Los Villanos on August 9

== Luchas de Apuestas record ==
Winner (wager)	Loser (wager)	Location	Event	Date	Notes
Psycho Clown (mask)	Super Crazy (hair)	Mexico City	Aniversario de Los Perros del Mal	May 29, 2011	(Note: Six man tag team steel cage Masks vs. Hairs match, where Los Psycho Circus faced Los Perros del Mal (Crazy, El Hijo del Perro Aguayo and Damián 666).)
Psycho Clown (mask)	X-Fly (hair)	Guadalajara, Jalisco	Verano de Escándalo	July 31, 2011	(Note: Six man tag team steel cage Masks vs. Hairs match, where Los Psycho Circus faced Los Perros del Mal (X-Fly, Damián 666 and Halloween).)
Damián 666 (hair)	Monster Clown (Championship)	Naucalpan, Mexico State	IWRG show	August 28, 2011	(Note: Four tag team steel cage match, where Los Psycho Circus put their IWRG Intercontinental Trios Championship on the line against the hairs/masks of Los Perros del Mal (Damián 666, Bestia 666 and X-Fly), Los Temerarios (Black Terry, Durok and Machin) and Los Villanos (Kortiz, Ray Mendoza, Jr. and Villano IV).)
Los Psycho Circus (mask) (Monster Clown, Murder Clown and Psycho Clown)	Los Perros del Mal (hair) (Halloween, Damián 666 and Nicho el Millonario)	Monterrey, Nuevo León	Héroes Inmortales (2011)	October 9, 2011	(Note: Steel cage Masks vs. Hairs match.)
Psycho Clown (mask)	El Texano Jr. (hair)	Mexico City	Triplemanía XXII	August 17, 2014	
Psycho Clown (mask)	Dr. Wagner Jr. (mask)	Mexico City	Triplemanía XXV	August 26, 2017	
