= AAA Northern Tag Team Championship =

Professional wrestling championship

Details
- Promotion: Lucha Libre AAA Worldwide
- Date established: Before February 15, 2004
- Date retired: 2017

Other name
- Northeastern Tag Team Championship
Statistics
- First champion: Los Caifán Rockeros
- Final champions: El Poder del Norte (Tigre Cota and Tito Santana)
- Most reigns: Diluvio Negro I and Gato Volador (2 times), Tito Santana (2 times)
- Longest reign: Poder del Norte (Tito Santana and Rio Bravo) (no less than 377 days)
- Shortest reign: Monje Negro Jr. and Sergio Romo Jr. (4 days)

The AAA Northern Tag Team Championship (Campeonatos de Parejas del Norte AAA in Spanish) was a secondary tag team title contested for in the Mexican lucha libre promotion Lucha Libre AAA Worldwide (AAA). The title was contested for almost exclusively in the Monterrey, Nuevo León area, primarily in Arena Coliseo. The championship was generally not featured on AAA's television programming not even when reigning champions wrestled. Some of the championship histories is unclear, especially around the creation of the championship, it was originally not an AAA championship but a Northwestern region tag team title defended on the independent circuit but the origin remains unclear. Being a professional wrestling championship, it is not won legitimately: it is instead won via a predetermined ending to a wrestling match.

== Status ==
The last known AAA Northern Tag Team Champions during its original tenure were Poder del Norte ("The Power of the North"; Tigre Cota and Tito Santana), who defeated Angel Dorada Jr. and Sky on March 7, 2010 to win the titles. This is the first championship reign for this particular combination of Poder del Norte, however Tito Santana and Rio Bravo previously held the titles for a long period of time from 2007 until 2009. The championship has not been defended since it was won in March 2010. in 2012, Tito Santana was turned into "Soul Rocker" and made a part of Los Infierno Rockers with Machine Rocker, Uru Rocker, Devil Rocker and Demon Rocker, retiring the title. The championship was revived in 2017; on October 16, 2017, La División del Norte ("The Northern Division "; Kuas Extrem and Snaiper) won a four-way tag team match to win the revived championships. The team has yet to defend the titles.

== Title history ==
Key
No.	Overall reign number
Reign	Reign number for the specific team—reign numbers for the individuals are in parentheses, if different
Days	Number of days held
N/A	Unknown information
(NLT)	Championship change took place "no later than" the date listed
†	Championship change is unrecognized by the promotion

No.	Champion	Championship change			Reign statistics		Notes	Ref.
No.	Champion	Date	Event	Location	Reign	Days	Notes	Ref.
Lucha Libre AAA Worldwide (AAA)
Championship history is unrecorded from 2000 to February 15, 2004.
1	Los Caifán Rockeros (I and II)	February 15, 2004 (n)	House show	Monterrey, Nuevo León	1	(Note: The exact length of time Los Caifán Rockeros held the championship is too uncertain to calculate.)		
Championship history is unrecorded from 2004 to February 3, 2007.
2	Diluvio Negro I and Gato Volador (Note: This is not the wrestler currently working as Gato Eveready, who was once billed as Gato Volador as well)	February 3, 2007 (n)	House show	Monterrey, Nuevo León	1	(Note: the exact date on which Diluvio Negro I and Gato Volador won the championship is unknown, which means the title reign lasted between 1 and 1,084 days.)		
3	Monje Negro Jr. and Sergio Romo Jr.	February 4, 2007	House show	Monterrey, Nuevo León	1	4		
4	Diluvio Negro I and Gato Volador	February 8, 2007	House show	Monterrey, Nuevo León	2	(Note: the exact date on which Diluvio Negro I and Gato Volador lost the championship is unknown, which means the title reign lasted between 1 and 1,422 days.)		
5	Poder del Norte (Tito Santana and Rio Bravo)	December 31, 2007 (n)	House show	Monterrey, Nuevo León	1	(Note: the exact date on which Poder del Norte won the championship is unknown, which means the title reign lasted between 377 and 1,798 days.)		
6	La Momia and Virtual X	January 11, 2009	House show	Monterrey, Nuevo León	1	56		
7	Ejecutor and Mr. Secuestro	March 8, 2009	House show	Monterrey, Nuevo León	1	133		
8	Rey Dragon (Note: This was not Dark Ozz who wrestled as Rey Dragon in 1999.) and Transportador del Norte	July 19, 2009	House show	Monterrey, Nuevo León	1	42		
9	Epidemius and Transportador del Norte	August 30, 2009	House show	Monterrey, Nuevo León	1	84	Rey Dragon left the promotion and Epidemius was allowed to replace him.	
10	Angel Dorada Jr. and Sky	November 22, 2009	House show	Monterrey, Nuevo León	1	105		
11	Poder del Norte (Tigre Cota and Tito Santana (2))	March 7, 2010	House show	Monterrey, Nuevo León	1	Uncertain		
—	Vacated	2012	—	—	—	—	Titles vacated after Tito Santana was turned into "Soul Rocker".	
12	La División del Norte (Kuas Extrem and Snaiper)	October 16, 2017	House show	Monterrey, Nuevo León	1	Uncertain	Defeated Dragster and Street Boy, Rio Bravo Jr. and Violento, and Dulce Kanela and Larry Miranda Jr. in a four-way match to win the vacant titles.	
—	Deactivated	2017	—	—	—	—	The title deactivated Sometime in 2017.	
