= Murder Clown =

Mexican professional wrestler

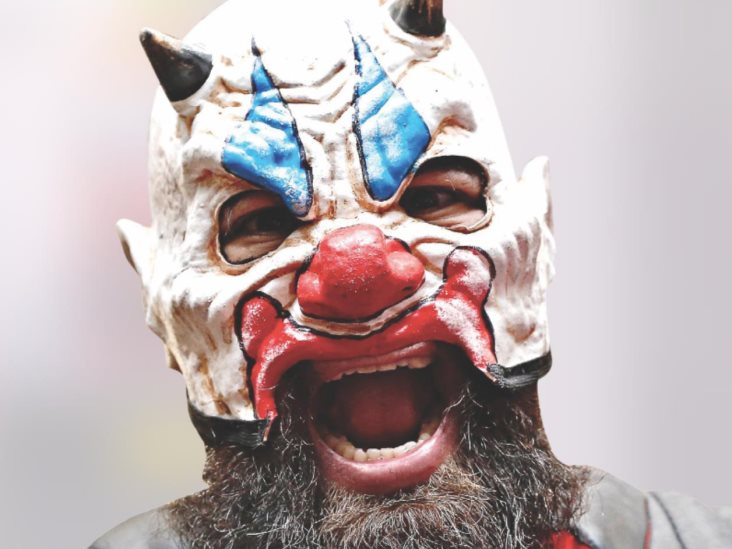

Personal information
- Born: March 1, 1986 (age 40) Mexico City, Mexico

Professional wrestling career
- Ring name(s): Killer Clown; Murder Clown
- Billed height: 193 cm (6 ft 4 in)
- Billed weight: 140 kg (309 lb)
- Billed from: The Psycho Circus; México City, México
- Trained by: Canek
- Debut: 2003

Murder Clown (born March 1, 1986) is the ring name of a Mexican professional wrestler, signed to Lucha Libre AAA Worldwide (AAA). Murder Clown's ring character is that of a nightmarish clown and he is part of Los Psycho Circus along with Monster Clown and Psycho Clown. Murder Clown's real name is not a matter of public record, as is often the case with masked wrestlers in Mexico where their private lives are kept secret from the professional wrestling fans.

== Professional wrestling career ==
=== Lucha Libre AAA Worldwide (2007–present) ===
==== Los Psycho Circus ====
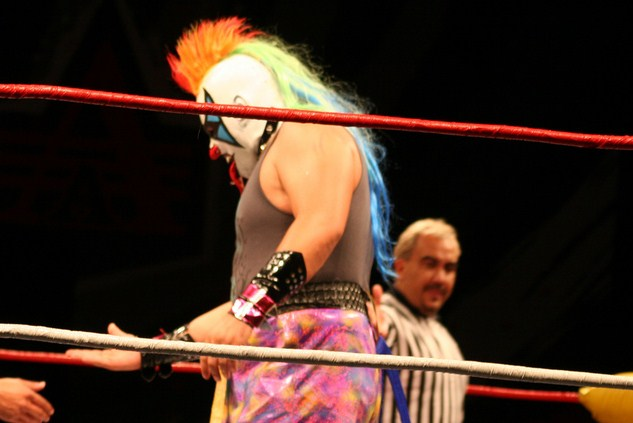
Monster Clown's partner Psycho Clown

In late 2007 AAA decided to repackage Aliens turning him into "Zombie Clown" and making him a part of Los Psycho Circus along with Psycho Clown and Monster Clown. Unlike previous Clown characters who wore fabric masks Los Psycho Circus wore rubber masks with more horrific, twisted facial expressions, inspired by the movie Killer Klowns from Outer Space. Zombie Clown's mask features rotting yellow teeth, skin blotches and a small blue tophat. The team made their debut on December 14, 2007, during a show in Chilpancingo, Guerrero where they defeated Real Fuerza Aérea (Aero Star, Super Fly and Pegasso). Los Psycho Circus was physically larger than most of the AAA wrestlers and soon established themselves as a dominant force in the ring as they began to amass an exagarated winning streak. Los Psycho Circus developed a rivalry with The Dark Family, teaming with Chessman to even the sides between the two teams. On January 18, 2009, Los Psycho Circus and Chessman defeated The Dark Family (Dark Cuervo, Dark Escoria, Dark Espiritu and Dark Ozz) to win the Mexican National Atómicos Championship. The team's run with the Atómicos titles ended after just 8 days when AAA Commissioner Vampiro stripped Chessman and Los Psycho Circus of the titles because they had attacked him during a show the night before.

They wrestled at Triplemania XVII, defeating Real Fuerza Aérea (Laredo Kid, Super Fly and Aero Star) in a sub-three minute match which Los Psycho Circus dominated. In August 2009 it was announced the Zombie Clown's name had been changed to Monster Clown and Killer Clown would be known as "Murder Clown" from that point forwards due to copyright problems with the original names. Los Psycho Circus kept their winning streak alive as they defeated La Yakuza (El Oriental, Kenzo Suzuki and Sugi San) in the opening match of the 2009 Verano de Escandalo. In the winter of 2009 Los Psycho Circus began siding with Cibernético in his feud with Konnan and La Legión Extranjera teaming with him in eight-man matches against La Legión, this was the first time that Los Psycho Circus had teamed up with a tecnico (good guy). At the 2010 Rey de Reyes event Los Psycho Circus served as Lumberjacks during a Lumberjack match where they kept La Legión from interfering in the match, allowing Cibernético to pin Konnan. During the summer of 2010 it was announced that Los Psycho Circus ' win streak had reached 600 victories. On October 31, 2010, Los Psycho Circus formed a new alliance named Potencia Mundial (World Power) with AAA Mega Champion Dr. Wagner, Jr. On December 5, 2010, at Guerra de Titanes Los Psycho Circus' long undefeated streak came to an end, when Los Perros del Mal (Damián 666, Halloween and X-Fly) handed them their first ever loss in a steel cage weapons match, thanks to an interference from the leader of Los Perros, El Hijo del Perro Aguayo. On April 24, 2011, Los Psycho Circus defeated Los Maniacos (Joe Líder, Silver King and Último Gladiador), Los Oficiales (Oficial 911, Oficial AK-47 and Oficial Fierro) and Los Perros del Mal (Bestia 666, Damián 666 and X-Fly) in a four–way elimination steel cage match to win the IWRG Intercontinental Trios Championship at IWRG's Guerra de Empresas show. The feud continued at Triplemanía XIX, where Damián 666, Halloween and X-Fly defeated Los Psycho Circus in a tournament final to become the first ever AAA World Trios Champions. On July 31 at Verano de Escándalo, Los Psycho Circus faced Los Perros del Mal in a steel cage match, where the last person left in the cage would lose either his hair or mask. The match ended with Psycho Clown escaping the cage, leaving X-Fly inside and forcing him to have his hair shaved off. On August 28, Los Psycho Circus lost the IWRG Intercontinental Trios Championship to Bestia 666, Damián 666 and X-Fly of Los Perros del Mal in a four team steel cage match, which also included Los Temerarios (Black Terry, Durok and Machin) and Los Villanos (Kortiz, Ray Mendoza, Jr. and Villano IV). On October 9 at Héroes Inmortales, Los Psycho Circus and Los Perros del Mal ended their year long rivalry, when the clowns defeated Damián 666, Halloween and Nicho el Millonario in a Masks vs. Hairs steel cage match to take their hairs. After a five month break from the rivalry, Los Psycho Circus defeated Damián 666, Halloween and X-Fly of Los Perros del Mal on March 11, 2012, to win the AAA World Trios Championship. They lost the title to El Consejo (Máscara Año 2000, Jr., El Texano, Jr. and Toscano) on May 19, 2012. Los Psycho Circus regained the title from El Consejo on February 18, 2013. They lost the title to Los Hell Brothers (Averno, Chessman and Cibernético) on June 14, 2015, at Verano de Escándalo. On October 2, 2016, at Héroes Inmortales X, Monster and Murder Clown turned on Psycho Clown and formed a new partnership with his rival Pagano.

=== Impact Wrestling (2018) ===
Máximo made a special appearance on the October 11, 2018, edition of IMPACT Wrestling, which was taped September 13–14, 2018 at Mexico City's Frontón México Entertainment Center, defeating Joe Hendry accompanied by Katarina. After the match, Clown performed a Powerbomb on Hendry through the table.

== In other media ==
Murder Clown and the rest of Los Psycho Circus are all playable characters in the video game Lucha Libre AAA: Héroes del Ring, which was released at the end of 2010.

== Championships and accomplishments ==
- Lucha Libre AAA World Wide

- AAA World Tag Team Championship (1 time) – with Monster Clown
- AAA World Trios Championship (3 times) – with Monster Clown and Psycho Clown (2) and Dave the Clown, Panic Clown and Psycho Clown (1)
- Mexican National Atómicos Championship (1 time) – with Chessman, Monster Clown and Psycho Clown
- Copa Brazo de Plata (2021) – with El Hijo Del Vikingo

- International Wrestling League

- IWL Trios Championship (2 times) – with Monster Clown and Psycho Clown

- International Wrestling Revolution Group

- IWRG Intercontinental Trios Championship (1 time) – with Monster Clown and Psycho Clown

- Perros del Mal Producciones

- Perros del Mal Heavyweight Championship (1 time, current)

- Produciones TAO

- TAO Extrema Championship (1 time)

- Pro Wrestling Illustrated
  - Ranked No. 260 of the top 500 singles wrestlers in the PWI 500 in 2021
- Wrestling Observer Newsletter

- Worst Match of the Year (2015) with Monster Clown and Psycho Clown vs. Villano III, Villano IV and Villano V on August 9

== Luchas de Apuestas record ==
| Winner (wager) | Loser (wager) | Location | Event | Date | Notes |
|---|---|---|---|---|---|
| Los Psycho Circus (masks) (Monster Clown, Murder Clown and Psycho Clown) | Los Perros del Mal (hairs) (Halloween, Damián 666 and Nicho el Millonario) | Monterrey, Nuevo León | Heroes Inmortales | October 9, 2011 | (Note: Steel cage match Masks vs. Hairs match.) |
