= Mocho Cota Jr. =

Mexican professional wrestler

Personal information
- Born: Alejandro Cota; July 2, 1977 (age 49) Mexico

Professional wrestling career
- Ring name(s): Mocho Cota Jr. Tigre Cota
- Trained by: Mocho Cota; Rodolfo Ruíz; Franco Columbo
- Debut: 1996

Alejandro Cota (born July 2, 1977) is a Mexican professional wrestler, known by his ring name as Mocho Cota Jr., currently working for the Mexican promotion Lucha Libre AAA Worldwide (AAA) portraying a rudo ("bad guy") wrestling character. He is the son of the original Mocho Cota and had a brother who worked as Tayco.

Cota is currently part of a trio known as El Nuevo Poder del Norte ("The New Power of the North") along with Tito Santana and Carta Brava Jr. who works for Lucha Libre AAA Worldwide. The trio are former AAA World Trios Champions.

== Championships and accomplishments ==
- International Wrestling Revolution Group

- IWRG Intercontinental Trios Championship (1 time, current) – with Súper Comando and Tito Santana

- Lucha Libre AAA Worldwide

- AAA Northern Middleweight Championship (1 time)
- AAA Northern Tag Team Championship (3 times) – with Tito Santana
- AAA World Trios Championship (3 times) – with Carta Brava Jr. and Soul Rocker/Tito Santana

== Luchas de Apuestas record ==
| Winner (wager) | Loser (wager) | Location | Event | Date | Notes |
|---|---|---|---|---|---|
| Hombre Sin Miedo (hair) | Tigre Cota (hair) | Nuevo Laredo, Tamaulipas | Live event | May 7, 2007 | |
| Los OGTs (hairs) (Averno, Chessman and Super Fly) | El Nuevo Poder del Norte (hairs) (Carta Brava Jr., Mocho Cota Jr. and Tito Santana) | Monterrey, Nuevo León | Verano de Escándalo | June 3, 2018 | |
