= Monster Clown =

Mexican luchador (born 1976)

Personal information
- Born: Rafael Ramírez Solorza; February 24, 1976 (age 50) Tepeji del Río de Ocampo, Hidalgo, Mexico

Professional wrestling career
- Ring name(s): Fantomas; Highlander; Aliens; Zombie Clown; Monster Clown
- Billed height: 1.90 m (6 ft 3 in)
- Billed weight: 110 kg (243 lb)

Rafael Ramírez Solorza (born February 24, 1976) is a Mexican professional wrestler, better known by the ring name Monster Clown and previously worked as Aliens between 2004 and 2007 before adopting his current ring name. He is currently under contract with Lucha Libre AAA Worldwide.

He is best known as Monster Clown, being part of Los Psycho Circus along with Psycho Clown and Murder Clown where they portray a trio of "evil clowns". Ramirez previously worked under the ring names Highlander and Aliens before becoming a part of Los Psycho Circus. In the summer of 2009 he was forced to change his ring name from Zombie Clown to Monster Clown due to copyright problems.

== Professional wrestling career ==
Ramirez began his professional wrestling career in 1997 as the masked wrestler "Highlander" working primarily in and around the Tijuana, Baja California area. He some times worked on Lucha Libre AAA World Wide (AAA) shows when the promotion ran shows in Tijuana, but was not a full-time member of the roster. In 2004 he began working more for AAA as AAA owner Antonio Peña came up with a new ring character for him called "Aliens". The "Aliens" character was that of an actual alien from space who had come to earth to wrestle. He was even given a mascota (a Mini-Estrella companion) called "Mungo". The odd duo joined up with Madrox and Kriptor to form the group "Los Alienigenas" and worked a feud with the colorful duo of El Alebrije and Cuije. When Peña died in the fall of 2007 the Aliens character quickly dropped as it did not fit with the direction the new management wanted.

=== Los Psycho Circus ===
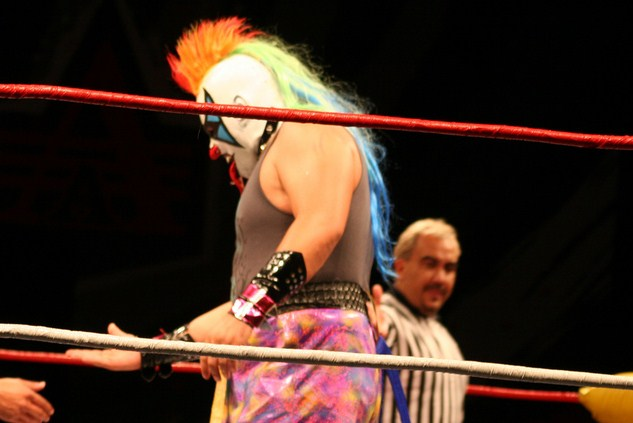
Monster Clown's partner Psycho Clown

In late 2007 AAA decided to repackage Aliens turning him into "Zombie Clown" and making him a part of Los Psycho Circus along with Psycho Clown and Murder Clown. Unlike previous Clown characters who wore fabric masks Los Psycho Circus wore rubber masks with more horrific, twisted facial expressions, inspired by the movie Killer Klowns from Outer Space. Zombie Clown's mask features rotting yellow teeth, skin blotches and a small blue tophat. The team made their debut on December 14, 2007 during a show in Chilpancingo, Guerrero where they defeated Real Fuerza Aérea (Aero Star, Super Fly and Pegasso). Los Psycho Circus was physically larger than most of the AAA wrestlers and soon established themselves as a dominant force in the ring as they began to amass an exagarated winning streak. Los Psycho Circus developed a rivalry with The Dark Family, teaming with Chessman to even the sides between the two teams. On January 18, 2009 Los Psycho Circus and Chessman defeated The Dark Family (Dark Cuervo, Dark Escoria, Dark Espiritu and Dark Ozz) to win the Mexican National Atómicos Championship. The team's run with the Atómicos titles ended after just 8 days when AAA Commissioner Vampiro stripped Chessman and Los Psycho Circus of the titles because they had attacked him during a show the night before.

They wrestled at Triplemania XVII, defeating Real Fuerza Aérea (Laredo Kid, Super Fly and Aero Star) in a sub-three minute match which Los Psycho Circus dominated. In August 2009 it was announced the Zombie Clown's name had been changed to Monster Clown and Killer Clown would be known as "Murder Clown" from that point forwards due to copyright problems with the original names. Los Psycho Circus kept their winning streak alive as they defeated La Yakuza (El Oriental, Kenzo Suzuki and Sugi San) in the opening match of the 2009 Verano de Escandalo. In the winter of 2009 Los Psycho Circus began siding with Cibernético in his feud with Konnan and La Legión Extranjera teaming with him in eight-man matches against La Legión, this was the first time that Los Psycho Circus had teamed up with a tecnico (good guy). At the 2010 Rey de Reyes event Los Psycho Circus served as Lumberjacks during a Lumberjack match where they kept La Legión from interfering in the match, allowing Cibernético to pin Konnan. During the summer of 2010 it was announced that Los Psycho Circus ' win streak had reached 600 victories. On October 31, 2010, Los Psycho Circus formed a new alliance named Potencia Mundial (World Power) with AAA Mega Champion Dr. Wagner, Jr. On December 5, 2010, at Guerra de Titanes Los Psycho Circus' long undefeated streak came to an end, when Los Perros del Mal (Damián 666, Halloween and X-Fly) handed them their first ever loss in a steel cage weapons match, thanks to an interference from the leader of Los Perros, El Hijo del Perro Aguayo. On April 24, 2011, Los Psycho Circus defeated Los Maniacos (Joe Líder, Silver King and Último Gladiador), Los Oficiales (Oficial 911, Oficial AK-47 and Oficial Fierro) and Los Perros del Mal (Bestia 666, Damián 666 and X-Fly) in a four–way elimination steel cage match to win the IWRG Intercontinental Trios Championship at IWRG's Guerra de Empresas show. The feud continued at Triplemanía XIX, where Damián 666, Halloween and X-Fly defeated Los Psycho Circus in a tournament final to become the first ever AAA World Trios Champions. On July 31 at Verano de Escándalo, Los Psycho Circus faced Los Perros del Mal in a steel cage match, where the last person left in the cage would lose either his hair or mask. The match ended with Psycho Clown escaping the cage, leaving X-Fly inside and forcing him to have his hair shaved off. On August 28, Los Psycho Circus lost the IWRG Intercontinental Trios Championship to Bestia 666, Damián 666 and X-Fly of Los Perros del Mal in a four team steel cage match, which also included Los Temerarios (Black Terry, Durok and Machin) and Los Villanos (Kortiz, Ray Mendoza, Jr. and Villano IV). On October 9 at Héroes Inmortales, Los Psycho Circus and Los Perros del Mal ended their year long rivalry, when the clowns defeated Damián 666, Halloween and Nicho el Millonario in a Masks vs. Hairs steel cage match to take their hairs. After a five month break from the rivalry, Los Psycho Circus defeated Damián 666, Halloween and X-Fly of Los Perros del Mal on March 11, 2012, to win the AAA World Trios Championship. They lost the title to El Consejo (Máscara Año 2000, Jr., El Texano, Jr. and Toscano) on May 19, 2012. Los Psycho Circus regained the title from El Consejo on February 18, 2013. They lost the title to Los Hell Brothers (Averno, Chessman and Cibernético) on June 14, 2015, at Verano de Escándalo. On October 2, 2016, at Héroes Inmortales X, Monster and Murder Clown turned on Psycho Clown and formed a new partnership with his rival Pagano.

== In other media ==
Monster Clown and the rest of Los Psycho Circus are all playable characters in the video game Lucha Libre AAA: Héroes del Ring, which was released at the end of 2010.

== Championships and accomplishments ==
- Lucha Libre AAA World Wide

- AAA World Tag Team Championship (1 time) – with Murder Clown
- AAA World Trios Championship (2 times) – with Murder Clown and Psycho Clown
- Mexican National Atómicos Championship (1 time) – with Chessman, Killer Clown and Psycho Clown

- International Wrestling League

- IWL Trios Championship (2 times)) – with Murder Clown and Psycho Clown

- International Wrestling Revolution Group

- IWRG Intercontinental Trios Championship (1 time) – with Murder Clown and Psycho Clown

- Wrestling Observer Newsletter

- Worst Match of the Year (2015) with Murder Clown and Psycho Clown vs. Villano III, Villano IV and Villano V on August 9

== Luchas de Apuestas record ==
Winner (wager)	Loser (wager)	Location	Event	Date	Notes
Damián 666 (hair)	Monster Clown (Championship)	Naucalpan, State of Mexico	IWRG show	August 28, 2011	(Note: Four tag team steel cage match, where Los Psycho Circus (Monster Clown, Murder Clown and Psycho Clown) put their IWRG Intercontinental Trios Championship on the line against the hairs/masks of Los Perros del Mal (Damián 666, Bestia 666 and X-Fly), Los Temerarios (Black Terry, Durok and Machin) and Los Villanos (Kortiz, Ray Mendoza, Jr. and Villano IV).)
Los Psycho Circus (masks) (Monster Clown, Murder Clown and Psycho Clown)	Los Perros del Mal (hairs) (Halloween, Damián 666 and Nicho el Millonario)	Monterrey, Nuevo León	Heroes Inmortales	October 9, 2011	(Note: Steel cage match Masks vs. Hairs match.)
Aero Star (mask)	Monster Clown (mask)	Monterrey, Nuevo León	Triplemanía Regia	December 1, 2019	(Note: Steel cage match, also involving Blue Demon Jr., Dr. Wagner Jr., Psycho Clown, Rey Escorpión and Texano Jr.)
