= Lucha Libre AAA: Héroes del Ring =

2010 lucha libre game

- North American box art, featuring Dr. Wagner, Jr.
- Developers: Immersion Games; Sabarasa Entertainment (Wii)
- Publishers: Konami; Slang Publishing (Wii)
- Platforms: PlayStation 3, Xbox 360, Wii
- Release: PlayStation 3, Xbox 360: NA: October 12, 2010; Wii: MEX: May 28, 2011
- Genre: Fighting
- Modes: Single-player, multiplayer

Lucha Libre AAA: Héroes del Ring (formerly AAA El Videojuego or AAA The Videogame) is a professional wrestling video game developed by Immersion Games and published by Konami for the PlayStation 3 and Xbox 360. The video game features over 40 wrestlers from the Mexico based Lucha Libre AAA Worldwide (AAA) professional wrestling promotion. The game was released on October 12, 2010, exclusively in North America. Cancelled Nintendo DS and PlayStation Portable versions were being developed by Sabarasa Entertainment, the same developers who did the Mexican exclusive Wii port which came out on May 28, 2011.

== Reception ==
Reception

Aggregate score
Aggregator	Score	
Aggregator	PS3	Xbox 360
Metacritic	54/100	49/100

Review scores
Publication	Score	
Publication	PS3	Xbox 360
GameSpot	5.5/10	5.5/10
GameZone	N/A	6.5/10
IGN	5/10	5/10
Joystiq	N/A	2/5
Official Xbox Magazine (US)	N/A	4.5/10
PlayStation: The Official Magazine	6/10	N/A

The PlayStation 3 version received "mixed" reviews, while the Xbox 360 version received "generally unfavorable reviews", according to video game review aggregator Metacritic. Despite some positive gameplay mechanics, good presentation and the inclusion of AAA legends, the game was criticised by reviewers for its slow gameplay and for being too similar to its WWE competitors.

== See also ==
- List of licensed wrestling video games
- List of fighting games
