= May Flowers =

Mexican professional wrestler

Personal information
- Born: Florencio Díaz Bolaños; October 27, 1962 (age 63) Torreón, Coahuila, Mexico

Professional wrestling career
- Ring name: May Flowers
- Billed height: 1.78 m (5 ft 10 in)
- Billed weight: 84 kg (185 lb)
- Trained by: King I; King II; Hector Lopez
- Debut: March 16, 1987

Florencio Díaz Bolaños (born October 27, 1962), known by the ring name May Flowers, is a Mexican professional wrestler. He is best known from his appearances in the Mexican promotion Asistencia Asesoría y Administración (AAA). May Flowers was a member of Los Vatos Locos, a Kiss look-alike group of wrestlers, with whom he held the Mexican National Atómicos Championship twice. He was also a part of the stable called Los Exóticos, a group of Exótico, or transvestite wrestlers.

== Professional wrestling career ==
=== Los Vatos Locos ===
In mid-1998 AAA owner Antonio Peña put together a new group of wrestlers, a stable called Los Vatos Locos (Spanish for "the crazy guys") consisting of Nygma, Charly Manson, May Flowers and Picudo. The team made their first pay-per-view appearance when they defeated Los Vipers (Histeria, Maniaco, Mosco de la Merced and Psicosis II) at the 1998 Verano de Escandalo. The Verano de Escandalo match was just the first encounter in a long storyline feud between the two groups that would last for several years. On February 14, 1999, Los Vatos Locos defeated Los Vipers to win the Mexican National Atómicos Championship. The team successfully defended the championship against Los Vipers at the 1999 Rey de Reyes show. Los Vatos Locos reign with the Atómicos title lasted only 63 days as they lost the championship to Los Junior Atómicos (Blue Demon Jr., La Parka Jr., Mascara Sagrada Jr. and Perro Aguayo Jr.) on April 18, 1999. The Vatos Locos / Los Vipers feud continued through 1999 with the two teams wrestling to a double disqualification at Triplemanía VII in June. Los Vatos Locos finally regained the Atómicos title from Los Vipers at the 1999 Guerra de Titanes show. The group's second Atómicos reign was only slightly longer than their first as they lost the title on April 15, 2000, to Los Vipers. In late 2000 Charly Manson broke away from Los Vatos Locos to join a newly formed group called The Black Family, in his place Los Vatos brought in Espiritu to replace him. In keeping with the "Kiss" theme set by Nygma and Picudo, Espiritu altered his appearance to look more like Paul Stanley's "Starchild" character. This combination of Los Vatos Locos (Nygma, Picudo, May Flowers, and Espiritu) did not last long, as May Flowers left the group in early 2001 to form his own Exóticos group. Los Vatos replaced May Flowers with Silver Cat, a ring persona patterned after Kiss drummer Peter Criss "the Catman" character, making Los Vatos Locos; the group even began carrying instruments to the ring and "perform". On November 23, 2001, this incarnation of Los Vatos Locos defeated longtime rivals Los Vipers to win the Mexican National Atómicos Championship without May Flowers.

== Championships and accomplishments ==
- Asistencia Asesoría y Administración
  - Mexican National Atómicos Championship (2 times) – with Picudo, Nygma and Charly Manson (2)
