= Verano de Escándalo (2004) =

2004 Lucha Libre AAA World Wide event

Verano de Escándalo 2004
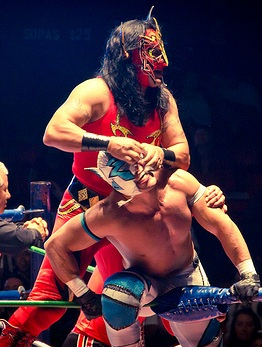
- Psicosis (In red) kept his mask in the main event.
- Promotion: AAA
- Date: October 16, 2004
- City: Orizaba, Mexico
- Attendance: 8,000

Pay-per-view chronology
← Previous; Triplemanía XII	Next → Guerra de Titanes

Verano de Escándalo chronology
← Previous; 2003	Next → 2005

The 2004 Verano de Escándalo (Spanish for "Summer of Scandal") was the eight annual Verano de Escándalo professional wrestling show promoted by AAA. The show took place on October 16, 2004, in Orizaba, Veracruz, Mexico. The main event featured a steel cage Luchas de Apuestas match where the last man in the cage would have to remove his mask or have his hair shaved off. The participants were Heavy Metal, El Intocable, and Zorro facing off against Los Vipers (Histeria, Mosco de la Merced, and Psicosis II).

== Production ==
=== Background ===
First held during the summer of 1997 the Mexican professional wrestling, company AAA began holding a major wrestling show during the summer, most often in September, called Verano de Escándalo ("Summer of Scandal"). The Verano de Escándalo show was an annual event from 1997 until 2011, then AAA did not hold a show in 2012 and 2013 before bringing the show back in 2014, but this time in June, putting it at the time AAA previously held their Triplemanía show. In 2012 and 2013 Triplemanía XX and Triplemanía XXI was held in August instead of the early summer. The show often features championship matches or Lucha de Apuestas or bet matches where the competitors risked their wrestling mask or hair on the outcome of the match. In Lucha Libre the Lucha de Apuetas match is considered more prestigious than a championship match and a lot of the major shows feature one or more Apuesta matches. The 2004 Verano de Escándalo show was the eighth show in the series.

=== Storylines ===
The Verano de Escándalo show featured fiveprofessional wrestling matches with different wrestlers involved in pre-existing, scripted feuds, plots, and storylines. Wrestlers were portrayed as either heels (referred to as rudos in Mexico, those that portray the "bad guys") or faces (técnicos in Mexico, the "good guy" characters) as they followed a series of tension-building events, which culminated in a wrestling match or series of matches.

== Results ==
No.	Results	Stipulations
1	El Oriental, Cinthia Moreno, Pimpinela Escarlata, and Mascarita Sagrada defeated Gran Apache, Fabi Apache, Polvo de Estrellas, and Mini Abismo Negro	Eight-man "Atómicos" tag team match
2	El Alebrije, Nautilus, and Octagón defeated Abismo Negro, Aliens, and Monsther	Six-man "Lucha Libre rules" tag team match
3	La Parka defeated Cibernético	"Lights Out" match
4	Electroshock and Charly Manson defeated Latin Lover and Chessman	Tag team match
5	Mosco de la Merced lost to Heavy Metal, El Intocable, Zorro and Los Vipers (Histeria and Psicosis)	Steel cage match
