= El Ángel (wrestler) =

Mexican Luchador under the ring name

Personal information
- Born: Óscar Omar Puentes Molgado; August 19, 1977 (age 48)

Professional wrestling career
- Ring name(s): El Ángel; Óscar Sevilla; El Novillero
- Billed height: 1.73 m (5 ft 8 in)
- Billed weight: 82 kg (181 lb)
- Trained by: Fernando Puentes; Villano I El Torero; Gran Apache; El Fantasma; Cementerio
- Debut: 1997

Óscar Omar Puentes Molgado (born August 19, 1977) is a Mexican professional wrestler under the ring name El Ángel (Spanish for "the Angel"). Puentes worked under the ring name Óscar Sevilla from 1997 until 2005 where he adopted the "El Ángel" ring character. He is manly known for his work in the Mexican promotion Asistencia Asesoría y Administración (AAA) which he worked for until mid-2009. He current works on the Mexican independent circuit and makes regular appearances for the Los Perros del Mal and International Wrestling Revolution Group promotions amongst others and occasionally works as El Novillero ("The Apprentice Bullfighter").

== Professional wrestling career ==
=== Óscar Sevilla (1997–2005) ===
Óscar Puentes made his professional wrestling debut for Asistencia Asesoría y Administración (AAA) in 1997, working under the ring name "Óscar Sevilla", he adopted the ring character of a Bullfighter, similar to El Torero who was quite popular at the time. While El Torero portrayed a seasoned bullfighter Sevilla played the part of a novice bullfighter, earning him the nickname El Novillero (the Spanish term for a novice bullfighter). Being young and unseasoned AAA decided to pair him up with Gran Apache and a group of seasoned rudós (bad guys or heels) to help him improve in the ring. Sevilla began a feud with the Gran Apache's led group of wrestlers that also included R-15, Cuerno de Chivo, Magnum 357 and Mohicano. On April 24, 1998, Sevilla defeated Mohicano in a Lucha de Apuesta match, winning the right to shave Mohicano bald after the match per. Lucha Libre traditions. At Triplemanía VI teamed with Charly Manson losing to Venum and R-15. The storyline between Sevilla and Gran Apache's group continued throughout 1998, resulting in Sevilla teaming up with Niño de la Calle to win a Lucha de Apuesta match over Tony and Luis Cirio on December 25, 1998. In early 1999 Sevilla qualified for the 1999 Rey de Reyes tournament, but was eliminated by Latin Lover in the semi-final. The long running storyline with Gran Apache reached a critical point on March 31, 2000, when Sevilla defeated him in a Lucha de Apuesta match, shaving him bald after the match only to be beaten up by Gran Apache. The final match in the storyline came at Triplemanía VIII where Gran Apache defeated Sevila in a one on one match. At Triplemanía IX Sevilla, Blue Demon, Jr. and El Hijo del Solitario lost to Los Exoticos (May Flowers, Pimpinela Escarlata and Polvo de Estrellas) in one of the undercard matches on the show.

On December 12, 2002, Sevilla teamed up with Los Barrio Boys (Alan, Billy Boy and Decnis) to defeat Los Vatos Locos, winning the Mexican National Atómicos Championship. The team had one successful title defense, defeating Hator, Monje Negro Jr., El Potro and Ben Hur on April 6, 2003 On July 18, 2003, the team lost the Atómicos title back to Los Vatos Locos but would regain them under a month later when they defeated Los Vatos Locos on August 8, 2003. Sevilla and Los Barrio Boys successfully defended the Atómicos title against Los Exoticos (Pimpinela Escarlata, May Flowers, Polvo de Estrellas and Sexy Francis) on October 26, 2003. Their second, and final run with the Mexican National Atómicos title ended on August 20, 2004, when they were defeated by The Black Family (Chessman, Ozz, Cuervo and Escoria), ending their combined reigns at 606 days in total. In early 2005 Sevilla took part in a special type of Apuestas match, where the competitors would risk their wrestling careers instead of their hair and mask. Sevilla and El Torero faced off against Rata II and Esquizofrenía in a two-stage Pareja Suicida match. In the first stage Sevilla and Toreror defeated their opponents, which meant that both Rata II and Esquizofrenía had to retire. Then immediately after that match Óscar Sevilla and Torero had to fight each other for their careers. By the end of the night Sevilla had retired his "mentor" El Torero as well. On July 3, 2005, Sevilla faced off against Sangre Chicana, Sangre Chicana Jr. and El Brazo in a four-way Luchas de Apuestas match. In the end Sangre Chicana Jr. pinned El Brazo, forcing him to have his hair shaved off while Óscar Sevilla escaped another Apuesta match without being shaved.

=== El Ángel (2005–2014) ===
In early 2005, Místico was becoming a very popular wrestler for rival Consejo Mundial de Lucha Libre (CMLL), which led AAA owner Antonio Peña to create his own version of Místico. He created the character El Ángel for Puentes, complete with a wing adorned mask and outfit in silver colors, mimicking the look of Místico. Like Argenis after him, being a copy of Místico but not being as talented as the original led to the concept not going over well with the crowd initially. Following a "tweaking" of the character, changing colors away from the gold and silver of Místico and focusing less on the "religious" aspects, the fans began accepting El Ángel as a tecnico ("good guy"). In early 2006 he was added to the group Real Fuerza Aérea both to distance him a bit from the Místico image and because he fit in the group of wrestlers who use a high flying style. In July 2006 El Ángel was one of several AAA wrestlers who toured with the Japanese promotion Pro Wrestling Noah. He participated in the 2008 Alas de Oro, but was the second one to be eliminated from the match, eliminated by Teddy Hart. In April 2009 El Ángel left AAA, citing his dissatisfaction with the amount of work they booked for him.

Starting in April 2009 El Ángel began working on the Mexican Independent circuit, including the Perros del Mal Producciones. Despite the "El Ángel" character being invented by AAA Puentes still works under the name. El Ángel became a regular in International Wrestling Revolution Group (IWRG), even working with former AAA colleagues as IWRG and AAA started to work together around the same time. On October 7, 2012, El Ángel won the IWRG Intercontinental Middleweight Championship by defeating Oficial AK-47 as the last man in a 10-man Steel cage match. It was later announced that Ángel would be one of 10 men to risk their mask in IWRG's annual El Castillo del Terror match. On October 28, Ángel turned on his tag team partner Trauma II, turning rudo ("Bad guy"), targeting Trauma II to improve his own odds for the Castillo del Terror. On February 17, 2013 Oficial 911 defeated El Ángel and Trauma II by count out, which meant that he would not be forced to put his mask on the line in a subsequent Luchas de Apuestas match, slated for March 3, 2013, while Trauma II and El Ángel would put their mask on the line. The decision was later reversed by the Mexico City wrestling commission due to the fact that 911 won by count out, he was put back in Luchas de Apuestas match. On the night 911 escaped with his mask safe, pining both Trauma II and El Ángel. In the end Trauma II pinned El Ángel even after Los Oficiales attacked both competitors. Following the match El Ángel removed his mask and gave it to Trauma II as a trophy of his victory and revealed his birth name; Óscar Omar Puentes Molgado. In the weeks following the mask loss El Ángel turned on his tag team partner Dr. Cerebro after Dr. Cerebro accidentally hit him during the match. Subsequently, he announced that he was now a rudo and was targeting Dr. Cerebro. On April 11, 2013 Eterno defeated El Ángel to win the IWRG Intercontinental Middleweight Championship, ending El Ángel's reign after 186 days. Following his mask and title loss El Ángel was one of thirty men competing in IWRG's 2013 Rey del Ring ("King of the Ring") tournament but was eliminated after only a few minutes in the match. On September 29, 2013, El Ángel, Canis Lupus, Astro Rey Jr., Avisman, Carta Brava Jr., Douki, Fulgor I and Oficial Rayan competed in an elimination match for the vacant IWRG Intercontinental Welterweight Championship. El Ángel was the fourth man eliminated over all in what was his last major IWRG show appearance.

=== Novilero (2015–present) ===
In 2015 Puentes started working under the name Óscar Sevilla El Novillero, or simply "El Novillero" as he reverted to his original bullfighter character for some independent circuit shows. He has worked with wrestlers billed as "El Nuevo Ángel" ("The New Angel") as well as "El Hijo del Ángel" (literally "The Son of El Ángel") but no family connection has been confirmed.

== Championships and accomplishments ==
- Asistencia Asesoría y Administración
  - Mexican National Atomicos Championship (2 times) - with Alan, Decnis, and Billy Boy
- International Wrestling Revolution Group
  - IWRG Intercontinental Middleweight Championship (1 time)
- Pro Wrestling Illustrated
  - PWI ranked him # 261 of the 500 best singles wrestlers of the PWI 500 in 2007

== Luchas de Apuestas record ==
Winner (wager)	Loser (wager)	Location	Event	Date	Notes
Óscar Sevilla (hair)	Yaguara (mask)	N/A	AAA Live event	N/A	
Óscar Sevilla (hair)	Jungla Roja (mask)	N/A	AAA Live event	N/A	
Óscar Sevilla (hair)	Cino (hair)	N/A	AAA Live event	N/A	
Óscar Sevilla (hair)	Mohicano I (hair)	Aguascalientes, Aguascalientes	AAA Live event	April 24, 1998	
Óscar Sevilla and Niño de la Calle (hair)	Tony and Luis Cirio (hair)	Tlalnepantla, State of Mexico	AAA Live event	December 25, 1998	
Óscar Sevilla (hair)	Cuerno de Chivo (mask)	Manzanillo, Colima	AAA Live event	May 2, 1999	
Óscar Sevilla (hair)	R-15 (hair)	Toluca, State of Mexico	AAA Live event	October 1, 1999	
Óscar Sevilla (hair)	Gran Apache (hair)	Ciudad Madero, Tamaulipas	AAA Live event	March 31, 2000	
Óscar Sevilla (hair)	Bat Blue (mask)	Villahermosa, Tabasco	AAA Live event	April 1, 2000	
Óscar Sevilla (hair)	Ángel Mortal (hair)	Monterrey, Nuevo León	AAA Live event	April 30, 2000	
Óscar Sevilla (hair)	R-15 (hair)	Toluca, State of Mexico	AAA Live event	September 30, 2000	
Óscar Sevilla (career)	El Torero, Rata II, Esquizofrenía (career)	Aguascalientes, Aguascalientes, Mexico	AAA Live event	February 3, 2005	
El Ángel (mask)	Oficial Fierro (mask)	Naucalpan, State of Mexico	El Castillo del Terror	November 1, 2012	
Trauma II (mask)	El Ángel (mask)	Naucalpan, State of Mexico	IWRG Live event	March 3, 2013	
