= Nygma (wrestler) =

Mexican professional wrestler

Personal information
- Born: January 21, 1974 (age 52)

Professional wrestling career
- Ring name(s): Galaxi; Nygma; Nigma
- Billed height: 1.73 m (5 ft 8 in)
- Billed weight: 80 kg (176 lb)
- Trained by: Rodolfo Ruiz; Raúl Reyes; Bestia Negra
- Debut: June 1992

Nygma (born January 21, 1974) is a Mexican professional wrestler, best known from his appearances in the Mexican promotion Asistencia Asesoría y Administración (AAA) which he has worked for with only short breaks since 1995/1996. Nygma has been a member of Los Vatos Locos, a Kiss look-alike group of wrestlers, with whom he held the Mexican National Atómicos Championship. Nygma was also a part of the Cibernético led group Los Bizarros. Currently, he is part of a team called Los Exóticos, a group of Exotico, or transvestite wrestlers. Nygma's real name is not a matter of public record, as is often the case with masked wrestlers in Mexico where their private lives are kept a secret from the wrestling fans.

== Professional wrestling career ==
The wrestler who later became known as Nygma made his debut in 1992 under the ring name Galaxi after training under Rodolfo Ruiz, Raúl Reyes and Bestia Negra. He was signed by Promo Azteca shortly after the group was formed and his ring persona was changed to "Nygma", inspired partly by the comic book character The Riddler whose name is "Edward Nygma". In 1996 Nygma moved from Promo Azteca to Asistencia Asesoría y Administración (AAA), initially working as a singles wrestler. On June 13, 1997, Nygma defeated El Salsero to win the Mexican National Welterweight Championship, the first wrestling championship of his career. Nygma only held the title for 42 days and lost it to El Torero in his first title defense.

=== Los Vatos Locos ===
In mid-1998 AAA owner Antonio Peña put together a new group of wrestlers, a stable called Los Vatos Locos (Spanish for "the crazy guys") consisting of Nygma, Charly Manson, May Flowers and Picudo. After joining Los Vatos Locos Nygma changed his appearance slightly, adopting an outfit and a face paint/mask combo inspired by Kiss lead guitarist Ace Frehley's "Spaceman" look. Picudo changed his look to resemble Gene Simmons' "Demon" outfit as well. The team made their first pay-per-view appearance when they defeated Los Vipers (Histeria, Maniaco, Mosco de la Merced and Psicosis II) at the 1998 Verano de Escandalo. The Verano de Escandalo match was just the first encounter in a long storyline feud between the two groups that would last for several years. On February 14, 1999, Los Vatos Locos defeated Los Vipers to win the Mexican National Atómicos Championship. The team successfully defended the championship against Los Vipers at the 1999 Rey de Reyes show. Los Vatos Locos reign with the Atómicos title lasted only 63 days as they lost the championship to Los Junior Atómicos (Blue Demon Jr., La Parka, Jr., Mascara Sagrada Jr. and Perro Aguayo Jr.) on April 18, 1999. The Vatos Locos / Los Vipers feud continued through 1999 with the two teams wrestling to a double disqualification at Triplemanía VII in June. Los Vatos Locos finally regained the Atómicos title from Los Vipers at the 1999 Guerra de Titanes show. The group's second Atómicos reign was only slightly longer than their first as they lost the title on April 15, 2000 to Los Vipers. In late 2000 Charly Manson broke away from Los Vatos Locos to join a newly formed group called The Black Family, in his place Los Vatos brought in Espiritu to replace him. In keeping with the "Kiss" theme set by Nygma and Picudo, Espiritu altered his appearance to look more like Paul Stanley's "Starchild" character. This combination of Los Vatos Locos (Nygma, Picudo, May Flowers, and Espiritu) did not last long, as May Flowers left the group in early 2001 to form his own Exóticos group. Los Vatos replaced May Flowers with Silver Cat, a ring persona patterned after Kiss drummer Peter Criss "the Catman" character, making Los Vatos Locos; the group even began carrying instruments to the ring and "perform". On November 23, 2001 the new incarnation of Los Vatos Locos defeated longtime rivals Los Vipers to win the Mexican National Atómicos Championship once more. Los Vatos third title reign lasted for over a year, 374 days, before they lost the titles back to Los Vipers. After losing the Atómicos title Los Vatos Locos featured less prominently on AAA shows, not making a single major show appearance after September 16, 2002, when they appeared at Verano de Escandalo (2002). In 2005 Espiritu left the group to join La Secta de Mesias, keeping a friendly relationship with his old group.

=== Los Night Queens ===
By mid-2007 both Picudo and Silver Cat began working a much lighter schedule, working more backstage than in the ring. This left Nygma in limbo with no direction. At the 2007 Antonio Peña Memorial Show Nygma returned to action, siding with Exóticos Polvo de Estrellas, Jessy and Yuriko, forming a group called Los Night Queens. As a group, their first action was to attack Pimpinela Escarlata and Cassandro, starting a storyline with the other exóticos in AAA. Los Night Queens attempted to qualify for the 2008 Rey de Reyes twice but lost to Real Fuerza Aérea (Aero Star, El Ángel, Pegasso, and Rey Cometa) on February 23, 2008 and to Abismo Negro and Psicosis on March 5.

=== Los Bizarros ===
In mid-2009 Nygma left AAA and became part of Los Bizarros, a group led by Cibernético who himself had left AAA, and consisted of Nygma (representing the homosexual lifestyle via his Exótico persona), Punket (representing the "Punk" lifestyle), Emo Extreme (Emo lifestyle) and Steel Rock ("Rocker" lifestyle). The team worked a couple of independent wrestling shows before Cibernético returned to AAA. On July 3, 2009, Los Bizarros helped Cibernético attack his rival Dr. Wagner, Jr. Subsequently, Los Bizarros worked a match for AAA on August 30, 2009, but disappeared from AAA shortly thereafter. After fourteen months away from AAA, Nygma returned on October 31, 2010, forming a new version of Los Bizarros with Cibernético, Amadeus, Escoria and Taboo. On November 22 Los Bizarros solidified their statuses as tweeners by attacking not only rudo stable La Sociedad, but also technico La Parka. On December 5, 2010, at Guerra de Titanes Charly Manson was revealed as the newest member of Los Bizarros, as he made a surprise jump from Consejo Mundial de Lucha Libre (CMLL) back to AAA. Los Bizarros' lineup was completed on March 13, 2011, when La Sociedad member Billy Boy revealed himself as Cibernético's mole and jumped to Los Bizarros, renaming himself Billy el Malo in the process.

=== Los Night Queens reunion ===
On August 19, 2011, Nygma reformed Los Night Queens with Pasión Cristal, Polvo de Estrellas and Yuriko, when the four attacked AAA Reina de Reinas Champion Pimpinela Escarlata, jealous over his recent success. Nygma's departure from Los Bizarros was never explained.

== Championships and accomplishments ==
- Asistencia Asesoría y Administración
  - Mexican National Atómicos Championship (3 times) – with Picudo, May Flowers and Charly Manson (2), with Espiritu, Picudo and Silver Cat (1)
  - Mexican National Welterweight Championship (1 time)
- International Wrestling Revolution Group
  - Distrito Federal Trios Championship (1 time) – with Diva Salvaje and Demasiado

== See also ==
- List of exóticos
