= Silver Cat =

Mexican professional wrestler

Personal information
- Born: Antonio Hernández Herrada; April 8, 1970 Mexico City, Mexico
- Died: March 29, 2024 (aged 53) Mexico City, Mexico
- Parent: Espectro I (father)
- Relatives: Picudo (brother); Antonio Peña (cousin)

Professional wrestling career
- Ring names: El Enjambre; Reptil; El Hijo del Espectro; Silver Cat
- Billed height: 1.78 m (5 ft 10 in)
- Billed weight: 90 kg (200 lb)
- Trained by: Espectro I; Rafael Salamanca
- Debut: 1989
- Retired: 2021

Achievements and titles

Antonio Hernández Herrada (April 8, 1970 – March 29, 2024), best known under the ring name Silver Cat, was a Mexican professional wrestler. He was mostly known for his appearances in the Mexican professional wrestling promotion Asistencia Asesoría y Administración (AAA). As Silver Cat, Hernández was a member of Los Vatos Locos, a Kiss look-alike group of wrestlers, with whom he held the Mexican National Atómicos Championship. Prior to 2001, he had previously worked as El Enjambre, Reptil and El Hijo del Espectro.

== Professional wrestling career ==
=== Early career ===
Silver Cat began wrestling under the name El Enjambre in 1991 in Empresa Mexicana de Lucha Libre (EMLL) which the following year would change its name to Consejo Mundial de Lucha Libre (CMLL). El Enjambre's last match in CMLL was on May 22, 1992, where he teamed with Arkángel de la Muerte and Marabunta to defeat Eclipse, Guerrero Samurai #2 and Pegaso. When Antonio Peña left CMLL in 1992 to start his own rival promotion called AAA, El Enjambre was one of the wrestlers who followed. Probably due to trademark registration from the previous promotion, he changed his name to Reptil. However, the new gimmick was short-lived when, starting in 1993, he began using the ring name El Hijo del Espectro (the son of Espectro).

=== Los Vatos Locos ===
In mid-1998 Peña put together a new group of wrestlers, a stable called Los Vatos Locos (Spanish for "the crazy guys"), which included Silver Cat's brother Picudo. This stable became very popular at the turn of the century and until its breakup in 2007, where they often went to matches against Los Vipers and The Black Family.

On April 20, 2001, El Hijo del Espectro lost his wrestling mask after losing in a lucha de apuestas match in Tijuana. After losing the mask, he adopted the Silver Cat gimmick. Los Vatos replaced May Flowers with Silver Cat, a ring persona patterned after Kiss drummer Peter Criss "the Catman" character, making Los Vatos Locos; the group even began carrying instruments to the ring and "perform". On November 23, 2001, the new incarnation of Los Vatos Locos defeated longtime rivals Los Vipers to win the Mexican National Atómicos Championship once more. Los Vatos third title reign lasted for over a year, 374 days, before they lost the titles back to Los Vipers. After losing the Atómicos title Los Vatos Locos featured less prominently on AAA shows, not making a single major show appearance after September 16, 2002, when they appeared at Verano de Escándalo.

=== Later career ===
On March 1, 2020, Silver Cat wrestled for AAA for the first time in 13 years, in a match where he, along with Venus and Mamba, lost a match to Pimpinela Escarlata, Lady Shani and Centinela. His last documented match took place on April 3, 2021 where he along with his nephew Picudo Jr., May Flowers and Nygma defeated the group Infierno Rockers at the Arena Azteca Budokan in Ciudad Nezahualcóyotl.

== Personal life and death ==
Antonio Hernández Herrada was the son of Espectro I and the younger brother of Picudo. He was also the cousin of Antonio Peña, the founder of AAA.

On March 29, 2024, Silver Cat died, which was first reported by his former teammate May Flowers via social media. The cause of death has not been made public, but it is already known that he suffered from health problems, including alcoholism.

== Championships and accomplishments ==
- Asistencia Asesoría y Administración
  - Mexican National Atómicos Championship (1 time) – with Espiritu, Nygma and Picudo

== Luchas de Apuestas record ==
Winner (wager)	Loser (wager)	Location	Event	Date	Notes
La Parka Jr. (mask)	El Hijo del Espectro (mask)	Tijuana, Baja California	Live event	April 20, 2001	

== See also ==
- List of premature professional wrestling deaths
