= Maniaco =

Mexican professional wrestler

Personal information
- Born: May 20, 1966 (age 60)

Professional wrestling career
- Ring name(s): Negro Herodes; Perro Silva; Maniaco; Últímo Viper
- Billed height: 1.76 m (5 ft 9 1/2 in)
- Billed weight: 88 kg (194 lb)
- Trained by: Agente Negro
- Debut: April 20, 1989

Maniaco (born May 20, 1966) is a Mexican professional wrestler best known for being a part of the Asistencia Asesoría y Administración (AAA) group Los Vipers. He currently works for Consejo Mundial de Lucha Libre (CMLL), although the storyline portrays him as an outsider, part of Los Independientes. Maniaco is a former four time holder of the Mexican National Atómicos Championship along with Histeria, Mosco de la Merced II and Psicosis II.

== Professional wrestling career ==
Maniaco originally wrestled under the name Negro Herodes before signing with the Mexican Professional wrestling promotion Asistencia Asesoría y Administración (AAA) where he was given the ring name "Perro Silva". In one of his early matches as Perro Silva he teamed up with Karloff Lagarde, Jr. and Mr. Condor defeated Las Gemas del Ring (Zafiro, Brillante and Diamante) in a Lucha de Apuesta match to unmask the trio. Las Gemas gained a measure of revenge when they defeated the trio of Silva, Lagarde, Jr. and Mr. Condor at Triplemanía III-B two months later. Following Triplemanía III-B Perro Silva became involved in a storyline with the técnico group Los Power Raiders (dressed as the Power Rangers characters). Los Power Raiders (Raider Rojo, Raider Blanco, Raider Negro, Raider Verde and Raider Azur) defeated Perro Silva, Espectro, Karis la Momia, El Duende, and Halloween at Triplemanía III-C. AAA owner Antonio Peña was later forced to drop the Los Power Raiders characters due to lawsuit threats from Mattel who owns the copyright to the Power Rangers series. Peña turned Los Power Raiders into Los Cadetes del Espacio (Spanish for "The Space Cadets"; Boomerang, Discovery, Frisbee, Ludxor and Venum). At Triplemanía IV-B Perro Silva teamed with Halloween, Kraken, and Mosco de la Merced only to lose to Rey Misterio Jr., Oro, Jr., Winners, and Super Caló.

=== Los Rudos de la Galaxia ===
In early 1997 Peña decided to form a rúdo group to feud with Los Cadetes del Espacio and formed a group called Los Rudos de la Galaxia ("The Villains of the Galaxy) among them a repackaged Perro Silva, who now wrestled as Maniaco. Maniaco teamed up with Abismo Negro, Mosco de la Merced, Histeria and March-1 and feuded with Los Cadetes del Espacio from the moment the group was formed. In 1997 AAA began a working relationship with the World Wrestling Federation (WWF), which resulted in the Cadetes vs. Rudos de la Galaxia feud being featured on the WWF Shotgun Saturday Night show as Discovery, Ludxor, Super Nova and Venum defeated Abismo Negro, El Mosco, Histeria and Maniaco. On June 15, 1997 Maniaco, Histeria and Mosco de la Merced appeared at Triplemanía V-B, defeating the team of Las Chivas Rayadas and Venum.

=== Los Vipers ===
In August, 1997 Cibernético formed a new "Super Rúdo" group called Los Vipers a group that absorbed most of the Los Rudos de la Galaxia members (Maniaco, Histeria, Abismo Negro, Mosco de la Merced) as well as Psicosis II. A few weeks after Los Vipers was born Histeria was replaced by a new Histeria and later on Mosco de la Merced would be replaced by Mosco de la Merced II. On August 23, 1998 Maniaco, Psicosis II, Histeria, and Mosco de la Merced II teamed up to participate in a tournament for the vacant Mexican National Atómicos Championship, representing Los Vipers. Los Vipers won the tournament by defeating Los Payasos (Coco Amarillo, Coco Azul, Coco Negro and Coco Rojo) in the finals to win the Atómicos title. Over the following months Los Vipers began a storyline feud with another group called Los Vatos Locos, which at the time consisted of Charly Manson, May Flowers, Nygma and Picudo. On February 14, 1999 Los Vatos Locos defeated Los Vipers to win the Atómicos championship. Los Vipers won the title a second time on September 17, 1999 when they defeated Los Junior Atómicos (Blue Demon, Jr., La Parka, Jr., Mascara Sagrada, Jr. and Perro Aguayo, Jr.). Los Vatos Locos managed to end Los Vipers second reign only three months later as they defeated Psicosis and partners on the undercard of the 1999 Guerra de Titanes show. Los Vipers regained the Atómicos title on April 15, 2000 effectively ending the storyline with Los Vatos Locos. Los Vipers reigned as Atómicos champions for over a year, until they were surprisingly upset by a little known group called Los Regio Guapos (Hator, Monje Negro, Jr., Potro, Jr. and Tigre Universitario) on August 19, 2001. Los Regio Guapos only held the title for under two months before Los Vipers regained the title and began their fourth reign with the Atómicos title. Their fourth reign also turned out to be the last reign for Los Vipers, ending on November 23, 2001 as a new version of Los Vatos Locos (Espiritu, Nygma, Picudo and Silver Cat) defeated them in one of the featured matches of the 2001 Guerra de Titanes. Los Vipers took part in an eight-man Steel cage match at Triplemanía X against Los Diabolicos (Mr. Condor, Ángel Mortal and El Gallego) and Gran Apache where the last wrestler in the cage would lose either his mask or be shaved bald. Maniaco was the last wrestler in the ring, and despite not being billed as being masked (he only wore a Zorro-style mask) he was unmasked following the loss.

=== After AAA ===
Following his mask loss Manico left AAA and began working on the independent circuit, often working under the name Últímo Viper (Spanish for "Last Viper"). When Histeria and Psicosis left AAA in 2009 Maniaco began teaming up with them again, reforming the Los Vipers group again.

=== Los Invasores ===
On April 12, 2010 a contingent of former AAA wrestlers including Psicosis II, Histeria, Maniaco, El Alebrije and Cuije appeared on a Consejo Mundial de Lucha Libre (CMLL) show in Puebla, Puebla. The group drown into the arena in a black SUV and attacked La Sombra, El Hijo del Fantasma and La Máscara after they just finished wrestling. Brazo de Plata, Místico and Jon Strongman tried to help out but were kept away by CMLL rudos Averno, El Texano, Jr. and El Terrible. Following the attack the former AAA wrestlers returned to the SUV and left the arena. The group made several subsequent attacks during CMLL shows, including running in during their Sunday Night Arena México show, indicating that the storyline was not limited to just the Puebla area. After weeks of run-ins the group, dubbed Los Independientes or "The Independents" after the "Independent circuit", wrestled their first match for CMLL. In their debut for CMLL on April 26, 2010 El Alebrije, Histeria and Psicosis defeated El Hijo del Fantasma, La Mascara and La Sombra. Since the beginning of the "Los Independientes" storyline neither Psicosis nor Histeria have worked on Perro del Mal events. On May 10, 2010, during a match between Los Independientes and CMLL wrestlers former CMLL and AAA wrestlers Universo 2000 and Máscara Año 2000 ran in to help Los Independientes beat up on their opponents, taking their side in the storyline between independent wrestlers and CMLL. Psicosis would be the first wrestler to face off against a CMLL wrestler in singles competition as he faced and list to El Hijo del Fantasma by disqualification. The team was later renamed Los Invasores. During a trios match between El Alebrije, Histeria II and Maniaco and the team of Héctor Garza, Brazo de Plata and Toscano, Garza turned on his team mates and joined Los Invasores. On May 16, 2010 Psicosis wrestled against La Sombra in a match that saw the surprise appearance of both Mr. Águila and Rayo de Jalisco, Jr. Mr. Águila returned to CMLL to side with Los Independientes while Rayo de Jalisco, Jr. ended up siding with CMLL in their war against the outsider group. The following day in Arena Coliseo Olímpico returned to CMLL and attacked Máximo during the main event of the show, at the time it was not clear if he had actually joined the group of outsiders or not. CMLL later held a press conference announcing that they would hold a special Sin Salida event on June 6, 2010 that would center around the Los Invasores vs. CMLL storyline. During the press conference Olímpico was part of the Invasores group. It was also announced that Garza and Mr. Águila were the co-leaders of the group.

== Championships and accomplishments ==
- Asistencia Asesoría y Administración

- Mexican National Atómicos Championship (5 times) – with Histeria, Mosco de la Merced II and Psicosis II (4)

- Pro Wrestling Illustrated

- PWI ranked him #295 of the 500 best singles wrestlers of the PWI 500 in 2000

== Luchas de Apuestas record ==
Winner (wager)	Loser (wager)	Location	Event	Date	Notes
Karloff Lagarde Jr. (hair), Perro Silva (mask) and Mr. Cóndor (hair)	Las Gemas del Ring (masks) (Zafiro, Brillante and Diamante)	Guadalajara, Jalisco	Live event	April 30, 1995	
Mr. Cóndor (hair)	Maniaco (mask)	Madero, Tamaulipas	Live event	July 5, 2002	(Note: Steel Cage match with Los Diabolicos and Gran Apache vs. Los Vipers cage match. Maniaco had not been considered an enmascarado before this match.)
Maniaco (hair)	El Potro Jr. (hair)	Nuevo León	Live event	August 14, 2005	(Note: This was a Triangle match that also included Charles Lucero)
