= Mosco de la Merced =

Mexican professional wrestler (1964–2024)

Personal information
- Born: Juan Valdez Valentino; June 23, 1964
- Died: August 19, 2024 (aged 60)

Professional wrestling career
- Ring name(s): Loco Valentino; Mosco de la Merced (II)
- Trained by: Rayo Dorado; Loco Valentino, Sr.
- Debut: 1983

Mosco de la Merced (Juan Valdez Valentino) (June 26, 1964 – August 19, 2024) was a Mexican professional wrestler, best known for his time in Asistencia Asesoría y Administración (AAA) where he was a part of Los Vipers for many years. Before adopting the Mosco de la Merced ring name he worked as Loco Valentino for over 10 years. He was a former holder of the Mexican National Tag Team Championship with Fuerza Guerrera and held the Mexican National Atómicos Championship four times with Histeria, Psicosis II and Maniaco. His name roughly translates to "Fly of Mercy".

== Professional wrestling career ==
He began his professional wrestling career under the name Loco Valentino, son of the original Loco Valentino who also trained him for his professional wrestling career. Valentino wrestled for the Universal Wrestling Association in the early 1990s, where he defeated Semanarista to win the UWA World Lightweight Championship on September 22, 1994. Valentino would hold the championship until the UWA closed down in January 1995 when he had to vacate the championship.

=== Asistencia Asesoría y Administración ===
After the UWA closed Valentino began working for Asistencia Asesoría y Administración (AAA), one of Mexico's largest wrestling promotions. His first major show appearance was on June 13, 1997 at Triplemanía V-A when he teamed up with Los Hampones losing to the team known as Los Cadetes del Espacio ("the Space Cadets" Discovery, Ludxor, Super Nova and Venum). Later in 1997 he teamed up with Picudo to compete in a tournament for the Mexican National Tag Team Championship, but were eliminated in the first round by Heavy Metal and Venum. At the 1997 Verano de Escandalo teamed up with Los Hampones once again, only to lose to a team composed mostly Los Cadetes (Discovery, Ludxor and Venum) with added the spectacular undercarder Flying.

==== Los Vipers ====
In August, 1997 Cibernético formed a "Super Rúdo" group called Los Vipers a group that included Abismo Negro, Maniaco, Histeria, Mosco de la Merced and Psicosis II. A few weeks after Los Vipers was born Histeria was replaced by a new Histeria. Mosco de la Merced left AAA not long after the formation of Los Vipers, leaving AAA a man short in the stable. Mosco also held the Mexican National Tag Team Championship with Fuerza Guerrera and his departure forced AAA to either vacate the championship or come up with an alternative plan. The solution was to give the Mosco de la Merced mask and full-bodysuit to Loco Valentino replacing the original Mosco de la Merced without publicly acknowledging it was a different wrestler under the mask. This allowed Mosco de la Merced (II) and Fuerza Guerrera to remain tag team champions and also fill the void in Los Vipers. On June 7, 1998 Mosco de la Merced and Fuerza Guerrera lost the tag team title to Perro Aguayo and Perro Aguayo, Jr.

On August 23, 1998 Mosco de la Merced, Maniaco, Psicosis II and Histeriateamed up to participate in a tournament for the vacant Mexican National Atómicos Championship, representing Los Vipers. Los Vipers won the tournament by defeating Los Payasos (Coco Amarillo, Coco Azul, Coco Negro and Coco Rojo) in the finals to win the Atómicos title. Over the following months Los Vipers began a storyline feud with another group called Los Vatos Locos, which at the time consisted of Charly Manson, May Flowers, Nygma and Picudo. On February 14, 1999 Los Vatos Locos defeated Los Vipers to win the Atómicos championship. Los Vipers won the title a second time on September 17, 1999 when they defeated Los Junior Atómicos (Blue Demon, Jr., La Parka, Jr., Mascara Sagrada, Jr. and Perro Aguayo, Jr.). Los Vatos Locos managed to end Los Vipers second reign only three months later as they defeated Psicosis and partners on the undercard of the 1999 Guerra de Titanes show. Los Vipers regained the Atómicos title on April 15, 2000 effectively ending the storyline with Los Vatos Locos. Los Vipers reigned as Atómicos champions for over a year, until they were surprisingly upset by a little-known group called Los Regio Guapos (Hator, Monje Negro, Jr., Potro, Jr. and Tigre Universitario) on August 19, 2001. Los Regio Guapos only held the title for under two months before Los Vipers regained the title and began their fourth reign with the Atómicos title. Their fourth reign also turned out to be the last reign for Los Vipers, ending on November 23, 2001 as a new version of Los Vatos Locos (Espiritu, Nygma, Picudo and Silver Cat) defeated them in one of the featured matches of the 2001 Guerra de Titanes. Los Vipers took part in an eight-man Steel cage match at Triplemanía X against Los Diabolicos (Mr. Condor, Ángel Mortal and El Gallego) and Gran Apache where the last wrestler in the cage would lose either his mask or be shaved bald. Mosco de la Merced was able to escape the cage and thus save his mask, although his fellow Viper Maniaco was less fortunate and was unmasked. Following Maniaco's mask loss Los Vipers were used less and less in AAA, especially Mosco de la Merced. During mid-2004 Los Vipers, in this case Mosco, Histeria and Psicosis II became involved in a feud with Heavy Metal, El Intocable and Zorro that led to a Steel Cage match at Verano de Escandalo 2004 in which the last man in the cage would be unmasked or have his hair shaved off. This time Mosco de la Merced was the last man in the ring and was forced to unmask per lucha libre (the professional wrestling style originary from Mexico) traditions.

=== Independent circuit ===
Not long after his mask loss Mosco de la Merced left AAA, but continued to wrestle as Mosco de la Merced on the independent circuit. In 2009 he began working for the Perros del Mal promotion, teaming with former Vipers' team mates Histeria and Psicosis II after they left AAA as well. He also teamed up with the original Mosco de la Merced, who wrestles as X-Fly.

== Death ==
De la Merced died on August 19, 2024, at the age of 60.

== Championships and accomplishments ==
- Asistencia Asesoría y Administración
  - Mexican National Atómicos Championship (5 times) – with Histeria, Maniaco and Psicosis II (4)
  - Mexican National Tag Team Championship (1 time) – with Fuerza Guerrera (Note: The original Mosco de la Merced won the title with Fuerza Gurrera but was replaced with Mosco II during the reign without it being made public knowledge, the reign is considered one continuous reign despite Mosco II not winning the title.)
- Pro Wrestling Illustrated
  - PWI ranked him #106 of the 500 best singles wrestlers of the PWI 500 in 1999
- Universal Wrestling Association
  - UWA World Lightweight Championship (1 time)

== Luchas de Apuestas record ==
Winner (wager)	Loser (wager)	Location	Event	Date	Notes
Gran Apache (hair)	Loco Valentino (hair)	León, Guanajuato	Live event	April 5, 1992	
Kid Guzmán (hair)	Loco Valentino (hair)	Acapulco, Guerrero	Live event	January 15, 1995	(Note: This was a triangle match that also included Babe Star)
Mosco de la Merced (mask)	Lover Boy (mask)	N/A	Live event	N/A	
Rey Dragón (hair)	Mosco de la Merced (hair)	Tulancingo, Hidalgo	Live event	January 31, 1999	(Note: Lucha del revés, hair vs. Hair match between two masked wrestlers)
Mosco de la Merced (mask)	Mitsuko (mask)	Pachuca, Hidalgo	Live event	July 25, 2000	
Mosco de la Merced (mask)	Blade (hair)	Guadalajara, Jalisco	Live event	June 30, 2002	
Mosco de la Merced (mask)	Gran Apache (hair)	León, Guanajuato	Live event	July 15, 2002	
Heavy Metal (hair)	Mosco de la Merced (mask)	Orizaba, Veracruz	Verano de Escándalo (2004)	October 16, 2004	(Note: Steel Cage match that also included El Zorro, El Intocable, Psicosis II and Histeria)
Mosco de la Merced (hair)	Dalia Negra (mask)	Oaxaca, Oaxaca	Live event	October 24, 2004	(Note: Last two men in a Steel Cage match that featured Halcon 78, Oscar Sevilla and La Novia De La Parka vs. Picudo, Espiritu and Perla vs. Histeria, Mosco de la Merced and Dalia Negra)
