= Psicosis II =

Mexican Luchador enmascarado (born 1967)

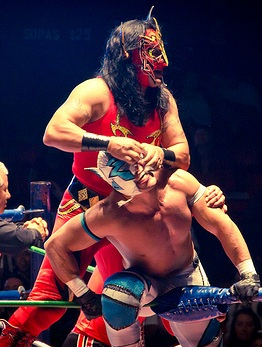
- Psicosis (in red) with Delta

Personal information
- Born: Juan Ebodio Gonzalez; February 22, 1967 (age 59) Puebla, Puebla, Mexico

Professional wrestling career
- Ring name(s): El Puma Jr. Ultra Taro; León Negro; Psicosis (II); Psycosis Extreme; Psycosys Xtreme; Psyco Ripper; Reapper; Ripper
- Billed height: 1.75 m (5 ft 9 in)
- Billed weight: 85 kg (187 lb)
- Trained by: El Puma; Rey Misterio, Sr. Ultraman
- Debut: Early 1990s

Juan Ebodio Gonzalez (born February 22, 1967) is a Mexican professional wrestler, better known under the ring name Psicosis. Gonzalez was the second wrestler to work as Psicosis, given the ring character by Asistencia Asesoría y Administración (AAA) to replace the original Psicosis, and is often denoted Psicosis II. When Gonzalez left AAA in early 2009, he was briefly replaced by a third Psicosis. He was not referred to as "Psicosis II" on promotional material; the name is used by fans to distinguish him from the original Psicosis. In November 2013, Gonzalez was renamed Psyco Ripper and shortly thereafter Reapper.

Gonzalez was unmasked on August 18, 2024 after losing a Lucha de Apuestas ("bet match") at Triplemania XXXII's third event.

== Professional wrestling career ==
=== Early career ===
Juan Gonzalez was trained by his father, who wrestled under the ring name El Puma. Upon his debut, he began working as El Puma Jr., mainly in the Puebla region and in Tijuana. When he began wrestling in Tijuana in 1994, he received additional training by Rey Misterio, Sr. and adopted the ring persona "León Negro" ("Black Lion"), a mid-card rúdo ("bad guy") character. In 1995, he travelled to Japan to wrestle for Frontier Martial-Arts Wrestling (FMW), teaming with Ultraman as Ultraman-Taro. In January 1996, Gonzalez lost the León Negro mask twice, both times losing a Lucha de Apuestas ("bet match") to Halloween, once in Tijuana and the other in San Luis Río Colorado.

=== AAA ===
==== Los Vipers (1997–2009) ====
Asistencia Asesoría y Administración (AAA) owner Antonio Peña noticed Gonzalez through his work in Tijuana, landing him a full-time AAA contract in 1997; he initially used the León Negro gimmick. At Triplemanía V-A on June 13, he and Heavy Metal won the hair of Halcon Dorado Jr. and May Flowers. Later that year, Peña selected him as the replacement for the original Psicosis, who was then wrestling full-time for World Championship Wrestling (WCW), to maintain the popularity of the character in AAA. Siding with Los Vipers leader Cibernético, he quickly became a core member of Los Vipers.

Psicosis and stablemates Histeria, Maniaco and Mosco de la Merced won a tournament for the vacant Mexican National Atómicos Championship on August 23, 1998, defeating Los Payasos (Coco Amarillo, Coco Azul, Coco Negro and Coco Rojo) in the finals. Over the following months, Los Vipers began a storyline feud with the group Los Vatos Locos (Charly Manson, May Flowers, Nygma and Picudo), who defeated them for the title on February 14, 1999. They won it again by defeating Los Junior Atómicos (Blue Demon Jr., La Parka Jr., Mascara Sagrada Jr. and Perro Aguayo Jr.) on September 17. They lost the title to Los Vatos Locos at Guerra de Titanes ("War of the Titans") on December 10, but regained it on April 15, 2000, ending the storyline between the two groups. After reigning for over a year, Los Vipers lost the title in an upset to the little-known group Los Regio Guapos (Hator, Monje Negro Jr., Potro Jr. and Tigre Universitario) on August 19, 2001, only to regain it for their fourth and final reign on October 7. At Guerra de Titanes on November 23, they lost the title to a new version of Los Vatos Locos (Espiritu, Nygma, Picudo and Silver Cat).

On August 13, 2002, Psicosis defeated Pimpinela Escarlata to win the Mexican National Middleweight Championship. He later turned técnico ("good guy") by aligning with Juventud Guerrera, Crazy Boy and Joe Líder as "The Mexican Powers". In early 2005, he began feuding with the original Psicosis over the rights to the name. At Triplemanía XIII on May 15, a steel cage match between the two ended in a no contest after they were attacked by Psicosis II's former partner Histeria, making it a three-way feud. On August 3, Psicosis II successfully defended his title against Histeria in a hardcore match, but was then stripped of it by the Mexico City Boxing and Wrestling Commission, who only permitted defenses in regular matches. The feud regarding the Psicosis name concluded with Histeria winning a ladder match; he then transferred the rights to Peña, only for him to allow Psicosis II to retain the character. On October 18, 2006, The Mexican Powers defeated The Black Family (Cuervo, Chessman, Escoria and Ozz) to win the Mexican National Atómicos Championship, but lost it to La Secta de Mesias (Cuervo, Escoria, Espiritu and Ozz) on May 20, 2007, after Psicosis II turned on his partners. Psicosis then joined Histeria and Abismo Negro to reform Los Vipers, this time called Viper's Revolucion. After Mr. Niebla joined the group, he and Histeria sided with him, kicking Negro out of the group. The feud with Negro was planned to culminate in a cage match at Triplemanía XVI on June 13, 2008, which was cancelled in the weeks leading up to the event, followed by Mr. Niebla leaving AAA.

=== Independent circuit (2009–2010) ===
In the summer of 2009, Psicosis II and Histeria both left AAA, citing their dissatisfaction with the lack of bookings and pay. They began wrestling on the independent circuit under their given names, which were later modified to "Psicosis Extreme" and "Histeria Extreme" due to legal threats from AAA. The pair were regulars for the Perros del Mal wrestling promotion and also worked for International Wrestling Revolution Group (IWRG).

=== Consejo Mundial de Lucha Libre (2010–2017) ===
==== Los Invasores (2010–2017) ====
On April 12, 2010, a contingent of former AAA wrestlers including Psicosis II, Histeria, Maniaco, El Alebrije and Cuije appeared at a Consejo Mundial de Lucha Libre (CMLL) show in Puebla. The group drove into the arena in a black SUV and attacked El Hijo del Fantasma, La Máscara and La Sombra after a match. Brazo de Plata, Místico and Jon Strongman tried to help out, but were kept away by rudos Averno, El Texano Jr. and El Terrible. Following the attack, the AAA wrestlers returned to the SUV and left the arena. The group, dubbed Los Independientes ("The Independents"), wrestled their first match in CMLL on April 26, with Psicosis II, El Alebrije and Histeria defeating El Hijo del Fantasma, La Máscara and La Sombra. Psicosis II was the first wrestler to face a CMLL wrestler in singles competition, losing to El Hijo del Fantasma by disqualification. The team was later renamed Los Invasores. At the CMLL 77th Anniversary Show on September 3, Psicosis II was one of fourteen men putting their mask on the line in a steel cage Lucha de Apuestas, keeping it safe as the twelfth and last man to leave the cage.

On September 20, 2011, Psicosis II, Olímpico and new Los Invasores leader Volador Jr., defeated Ángel de Oro, Diamante and Rush to win the Mexican National Trios Championship. They lost the title to Los Reyes de la Atlantida (Atlantis, Delta and Guerrero Maya Jr.) on December 16. Psicosis II, this time teaming with Los Invasores members Kraneo and Mr. Águila, regained the title from Los Reyes de la Atlantida on December 16, 2012, but lost it to La Máscara, Rush and Titán on June 30, 2013. In November, Psicosis II was renamed Psyco Ripper. The following month, his ring name was changed to Reapper.

=== Return to AAA (2017–present) ===
In 2017, Psicosis II announced he would be coming back for the 30 Man Ruleta Rusa at Triplemanía XXV. At the event, Psicosis, as part of Los Vipers, was defeated by Team Parka (Argenis, Bengala and La Parka).

== AAA lawsuit ==
In early April 2010, Psicosis, Histeria and El Alebrije sought legal action against AAA over the issues of name and ring character ownership, as well as unfair termination by AAA. The two claimed that they wrestled for 13 years to create the characters and thus owned them. The parties met in Mexico City's Board of Conciliation and Arbitration to see if a settlement could be reached or if the matter would be taken to court. The parties met for a second arbitration meeting in late April; the plaintiff group was joined by Latin Lover who, like Alebrije, Histeria and the others, claimed that he should be allowed to use the name since he worked as Latin Lover for 18 years and should be allowed to continue using it. After the meeting, it was stated that all parties involved were cooperating over the matter. El Alebrije, Histeria and Psicosis II were since renamed by CMLL.

== Championships and accomplishments ==
- Lucha Libre AAA Worldwide
  - AAA World Trios Championship (1 time) – with Abismo Negro Jr. and Toxin
  - Mexican National Atómicos Championship (5 times) – with Histeria, Mosco de la Merced II and Maniaco (4), Crazy Boy, Joe Líder and Juventud Guerrera)
  - Mexican National Middleweight Championship (1 time)
- Consejo Mundial de Lucha Libre
  - Mexican National Trios Championship (2 times) – with Olímpico and Volador Jr. (1), and Kraneo and Mr. Águila (1)
- Pro Wrestling Illustrated
  - PWI ranked him #229 of the top 500 wrestlers in the PWI 500 in 2012

== Luchas de Apuestas record ==
Winner (wager)	Loser (wager)	Location	Event	Date	Notes
Halloween (mask)	León Negro (mask)	Tijuana, Baja California	Live event	January 18, 1996	
Halloween (mask)	León Negro (mask)	San Luis Río Colorado, Sonora	Live event	January 26, 1996	(Note: This was a triangle match that also included Damián 666. He lost the León Negro mask in two different places within a week.)
León Negro (hair)	Hijo del Enfermero (mask)	Tijuana, Baja California	Live event	September 29, 1996	
Leon Negro (hair)	Halcón Dorado Jr. (hair)	Tijuana, Baja California	Triplemanía V-A	June 13, 1997	(Note: Multi-team match that saw the team of Heavy Metal and Leon Negro defeated the teams of Latin Lover and Perro Aguayo, Jr., Jerry Estrada and El Picudo and May Flowers and Halcón Dorado Jr. when Leon Negro pinned Halcón Dorado, Jr.)
Psicosis (mask)	Delfín (mask)	Culiacán, Sinaloa	Live event	June 13, 2003	(Note: This was a triangle Steel Cage match that also included Kalipsus.)
Psicosis (mask)	Delfín (hair)	Culiacán, Sinaloa	Live event	July 4, 2003	
Psicosis (mask) and Crazy Boy (mask)	Perverso de Panama I (mask) and Perverso de Panama II (mask)	Torreon, Coahuila	Live event	September 1, 2006	(Note: This was a triangle tag team match that also included Dralion and Nightmare.)
Psicosis (mask)	Infector (mask)	Tecámac, Mexico State	CWF Live event	May 15, 2016	(Note: Steel cage match that also included Histeria, Yelmo 2000, Zoom Driver and Violento Jack.)
Cibernético (hair)	Psicosis (mask)	Azcapotzalco, Mexico City,	Triplemanía XXXII: Mexico City	August 17, 2024	(Note: This was a Domo De La Muerte cage match that also involved Murder Clown, Dave the Clown, Panic Clown, Dark Cuervo, Dark Ozz, El Fiscal and Abismo Negro Jr.)
