= Mexican National Atómicos Championship =

Professional wrestling championship

- The front plate of the championship belts

Details
- Promotion: Asistencia Asesoría y Administración
- Date established: August 9, 1996
- Date retired: January 24, 2009
Statistics
- First champions: Pierroth Jr. and Los Villanos (Villano III, IV and V)
- Final champions: Chessman and Los Psycho Circus (Killer Clown, Psycho Clown and Zombie Clown)
- Most reigns: Los Vipers (4) (Histeria, Maniaco, Mosco de la Merced and Psicosis)
- Longest reign: The Black Family (Chessman, Dark Cuervo, Escoria and Dark Ozz) (1,155 days)
- Shortest reign: Chessman and Los Psycho Circus (Killer Clown, Psycho Clown and Zombie Clown) (7 days)

The Mexican National Atómicos Championship (Spanish: Campeonato Nacional Atómicos) was a tag team championship for four-man teams, or Atómicos as they are referred to in Lucha libre. The title is a national championship, controlled by the Mexico City Boxing and Wrestling Commission, which regulates all matches where the title is defended. The championship was created in 1996 and was primarily defended in the Asistencia Asesoría y Administración (AAA) promotion. In early 2009, the reigning champions, Chessman and Los Psycho Circus (Killer Clown, Psycho Clown, and Zombie Clown) were stripped of the title and it was subsequently declared inactive.

== Championship rules ==
The championship is a national title which means that non-Mexican citizens are prohibited from either challenging for or actually holding the championship. The title is also an Atómicos championship, meaning it is restricted to four-man tag teams. As is the case for every Mexican National titles, the championship is generally not allowed to be defended in any other type of match than a regular match. As it was classified as a national title, it officially prohibited non-Mexican citizens from challenging or holding the championship,, just like all other Mexican national championships. There have been instances where those rules have not been strictly enforced, but in the case of the atómicos championship, all champions were native Mexicans.

As it was a professional wrestling championship, the Mexican National Atómicos Championship was not won not by actual competition, but by a scripted ending to a match, determined by the bookers and matchmakers. (Note: Hornbaker (2016) p. 550: "Professional wrestling is a sport in which match finishes are predetermined. Thus, win–loss records are not indicative of a wrestler's genuine success based on their legitimate abilities – but on now much, or how little they were pushed by promoters") On occasion, the promotion declares a championship vacant, which means there is no championship holder at that point in time. This can either be due to a storyline, (Note: Duncan & Will (2000) p. 271, Chapter: Texas: NWA American Tag Team Title [World Class, Adkisson] "Championship held up and rematch ordered because of the interference of manager Gary Hart") or real-life issues such as a champion suffering an injury being unable to defend the championship, (Note: Duncan & Will (2000) p. 20, Chapter: (United States: 19th Century & widely defended titles – NWA, WWF, AWA, IW, ECW, NWA) NWA/WCW TV Title "Rhodes stripped on 85/10/19 for not defending the belt after having his leg broken by Ric Flair and Ole & Arn Anderson") or leaving the company. (Note: Duncan & Will (2000) p. 201, Chapter: (Memphis, Nashville) Memphis: USWA Tag Team Title "Vacant on 93/01/18 when Spike leaves the USWA.")

== History ==
The Mexican National Atómicos Championship was created in 1996 specifically for the AAA promotion to control. The first champions were crowned after an eight-team tournament that saw Pierroth Jr., Villano III, Villano IV, and Villano V become the inaugural champions after defeating Damián 666, El Hijo del Espectro, Halloween, and Karis La Momia. (Note: Duncan & Will (2000) p. 402, Chapter Mexico: Mexican National Atómicos Title [Peña] Los Villanos: III, IV, & V & Pierroth Jr. 1996/08/09 Nezahualcoyotl - Defeat Karis la Momia, Espectro Jr., Damian 666, & Halloween in a tournament final to become the first champions;) (Note: ''Lucha 2000 (2004) p. 19, Numero 1 – Pierroth, Jr. Villano III, Villano IV y Villano V 9 augusto 1996, Neza [Eng: Number 1 – Pierroth, Jr. Villano III, Villano IV and Villano V August 9, 1996, Neza]) In late 1996 Los Villanos left AAA for Promo Azteca, which meant the championship was inactive at that point. (Note: Duncan & Will (2000) p. 402, Chapter Mexico: Mexican National Atómicos Title [Peña] vacant when the champions jump to Promo Azteca) In 1997 Pierroth Jr. left AAA as well, with no reference made to the atómicos championship for about a year. In August AAA held an eight-team tournament that saw Los Vipers (Histeria, Maniaco, Mosco de la Merced, and Psicosis) defeat Los Payasos ("The Clowns"; Coco Amarillo, Coco Azul, Coco Negro, and Coco Rojo). (Note: Duncan & Will (2000) p. 402, Chapter Mexico: Mexican National Atómicos Title [Peña] Los Vipers: AAA Psicosis, AAA Histeria, AAA Mosco de la Merced, & Maniaco 1998/08/23 Azcapotzalco - Defeat Los Payasos in tournament final) (Note: ''Lucha 2000 (2004) p. 19, Numero 2 – Histeria, Maniaco, Mosco de la Merced y Psicosis (Los Vipers) 23 augusto 1999, Arena Azcapotzalco [Eng: Number 2 – Histeria, Maniaco, Mosco de la Merced and Psicosis (The Vipers) August 23, 1998, Arena Azcapotzalco])

Over the next four years Los Vipers and Los Vatos Locos ("The Crazy Guys"; Charly Manson, May Flowers, Nygma, and Picudo/Silver Cat) traded the championship between the two teams. (Note: Duncan & Will (2000) p. 402, Chapter Mexico: Mexican National Atómicos Title [Peña] Vatos Locos: Charly Manson, Nygma, May Flowers & El Picudo 1999/02/14 Monterrey) (Note: ''Lucha 2000 (2004) p. 19, Numero 3 – Charly Manson, May Flowers, Nygma y Picudo (Vatos Locos) 14 februaro 1999, Monterrey [Eng: Number 3 – Charly Manson, May Flowers, Nygma and Picudo (Vatos Locos) February 14, 1999, Monterrey]) (Note: Duncan & Will (2000) p. 402, Chapter Mexico: Mexican National Atómicos Title [Peña] Los Vipers [2] 1999/09/17 Mexico City) (Note: ''Lucha 2000 (2004) p. 19, Numero 5 – Los Vipers (dos veces) 17 septiembro 1999, DF [Eng: Number 5 – The Vipers (twice)September 17, 1999, Federal District]) (Note: Duncan & Will (2000) p. 402, Chapter Mexico: Mexican National Atómicos Title [Peña] Vatos Locos [2] 1999/12/10 Madero) (Note: ''Lucha 2000 (2004) p. 19, Numero 6 – Vatos Locos (dos veces) 10 deciembre 1999, Madero, Tamps. [Eng: Number 6 – Vatos Locos (twice) December 10, 1999, Madero, Tamps]) (Note: Duncan & Will (2000) p. 402, Chapter Mexico: Mexican National Atómicos Title [Peña] Vatos Locos [2] 1999/12/10 Madero) (Note: ''Lucha 2000 (2004) p. 19, Numero 7 – Los Vipers (tres veces) 15 abril 2009 [Eng: Number 7 – The Vipers (thrice) April 15, 2000]) (Note: ''Lucha 2000 (2004) p. 19, Numero 9 – Los Vipers (cuatro veces) 7 octubre 2001, Monterrey [Eng: Number 9 – The Vipers (four times) October 7, 2001, Monterrey]) (Note: ''Lucha 2000 (2004) p. 19, Numero 10 – Espíritu, Nygma, Silver Cat y Picudo (Nuevo Vatos Locos) 23 noviembre 2001, DF [Eng: Number 10 – Espíritu, Nygma, Silver Cat and Picudo (the new Vatos Locos) November 23, 2001, Federal District]) By December 2, 2002, Oscar Sevilla and Los Barrio Boys ("The Neighborhood Boys"; Alan, Billy Boy, and Decnis) won the championship, ending the Los Vipers/Los Vatos Locos dominance of the title. (Note: ''Lucha 2000 (2004) p. 19, Numero 11 – Alan, Billy Boy and Decnis (Los Barrio Boys) y Oscar Sevilla 2 deciembre 2002, Nuevo Laredo [Eng: Number 11 – Alan, Billy Boy and Decnis (The Neighborhood Boys) and Oscar Sevilla December 2, 2002, Nuevo Laredo]) The Black Family (Chessman, Cuervo, Escoria, and Ozz briefly held the championship for 21 days, (Note: ''Lucha 2000 (2004) p. 19, Numero 12 – Chessman, Cuervo, Escoria y Ozz (Black Family) 18 julio 2003, Madero, Tamps [Eng: Number 12 – Chessman, Cuervo, Escoria and Ozz (Black Family) July 18, 2003, Madero, Tamps]) before Sevilla and Los Barrio Boys regained the championship. (Note: ''Lucha 2000 (2004) p. 19, Numero 13 – Los Barrio Boys y Sevilla (dos veces) 8 augusto 2003, Puebla [Eng: Number 13 – The Neighborhood Boys and Sevilla (twice) August 8, 2003, Puebla]) The Black Family won the championship for a second time on August 20, 2004, (Note: ''Lucha 2000 (2004) p. 19, Numero 14 – Black Family (dos veces) 20 augusto 2004, Puebla [Eng: Number 14 – Black Family (twice) August 20, 2004, Puebla]) beginning a 789-day reign.

In October 2006 Psicosis and his new team, the Mexican Powers (Crazy Boy, Juventud Guerrera, and Joe Líder) won the championship, only for a reorganized Black Family, now known as La Secta del Mesias ("The Sect of the Messiah"), to claim the title on May 20, 2007. The last atómicos champions, Chessman and the Psycho Circus (Killer Clown, Psycho Clown, and Zombie Clown) were stripped of the titles on January 25, 2009, by AAA Commissioner Vampiro, in a storyline where they attacked Vampiro after winning the championship. In December 2008, AAA announced that they would no longer recognize or promote any non-AAA branded shows such as the atómicos championship, the Mexican National Tag Team Championship, and the UWA World Light Heavyweight Championship. While AAA introduced the AAA World Tag Team Championship and the AAA World Trios Championship, later on, they never created an AAA World Atómicos Championship.

== Reigns ==
The Mexican National Atómicos Championship was actively promoted by AAA from August 9, 1996, until January 24, 2009, a total of 4,551 days (12 years, 168 days). In that period of time, 11 different teams held the championship, for a combined 17 reigns. Los Vipers members Histeria, Maniaco, El Mosco de la Merced, and Psicosis hold the record for the most reigns as a team, a total of four, while Psicosis also held it as part of Mexican Powers, putting his individual count at five. The Black Family's (Chessman, Cuervo, Escoria, and Ozz) second reign, from August 20, 2004, to October 18, 2006, was the longest individual reign at 789 days. The Black Family's two reigns combined to 820 days, the most combined days of any team. Cuervo, Escoria, and Ozz held the championship both as part of the Black Family and La Secta de Mesias, putting their individual reigns at 1,420 days. The shortest reign was also the final reign, as Chessman and Los Psycho Circus were stripped of the championship only 6 days after winning it before it was abandoned. The championship was only vacant once during its history, as the original champions, Los Villanos and Pierroth Jr. left AAA in late 1996. After this, the championship was inactive for more thab year until a tournament was held in August 1998.

=== Mexican National Atómicos Championship tournament (1996) ===
In mid-1996, AAA was given permission by the Mexico City boxing and professional wrestling commission to create the "Mexican National Atómicos Championship", sanctioned by the commission, but under the daily control of the AAA booking team. Documentation for the full brackets of the tournament has not been found, but based on the results 10 teams competed in the tournament to determine the inaugural champions. After the initial rounds between August 3 and 4, 1996, two teams qualified for the third round: Pierroth Jr./Villano III/Villano IV/Villano V, and Damián 666/El Hijo del Espectro/Halloween/Karis La Momia. On August 9 Pierroth's team defeated Máscara Sagrada, Máscara Sagrada Jr., Tinieblas Jr., and Blue Demon Jr., who had not previously won any tournament matches. Damián's team defeated La Parka, Super Caló, Winners, and El Mexicano, who had also not competed in previous rounds, en route to the finals. In the end, Pierroth Jr. and Los Villanos won the final match to claim the championship.

- First round
- (August 3/4)

- Quarterfinals
- (August 3/4)

- Semifinals
- (August 3/4)

- Finals
- (August 9)

Máscara Sagrada, Máscara Sagrada Jr., Tinieblas Jr., and Blue Demon Jr.

Blue Demon Jr., Latin Lover, Máscara Sagrada, and Super Caló

Team Pierroth Jr.
W

Ángel Blanco Jr., Cien Caras, El Halcón, and Fishman
W

Team Blanco Jr.

Pierroth Jr., Villano III, Villano IV, and Villano V
W

Team Pierroth Jr.
W

Super Muñeco, Coco Amarillo, Coco Azul, and Coco Rojo

Team Pierroth Jr.
W

Antifaz, Latin Lover, Sergio Romo Jr., and Silver Star

Team Damián

Damián 666, El Hijo del Espectro, Halloween, and Karis La Momia
W

Team Damián
W

Heavy Metal, Jerry Estrada, Picudo, and Super Crazy

Team Konnan

Konnan, Rey Misterio Jr., Tinieblas Jr., and Venum
W

Team Damián
W

La Parka, Super Caló, Winners, and El Mexicano

=== Mexican National Atómicos Championship tournament (1998) ===
When Los Villanos left AAA in late 1996, AAA declared the Mexican National Atómicos Championship vacant and for approximately 1½ years did not have anyone else hold the championship. The company held an eight-team tournament in August 1998 to determine the second Atómicos champions. The first round took place on August 3, with Los Vipers (Psicosis, Histeria, Mosco de la Merced, Maniaco), Los Insectos (Abeja Africana, La Avispa, La Hormiga, La Mosca), Los Vatos Locos (Picudo, Nygma, May Flowers, Charly Manson) and Los Payasos (Coco Amarillo, Coco Azul, Coco Negro, Coco Rojo) all advanced. In the next round, on August 13, both Los Insectios and Los Vatos Locos were eliminated. In the finals, Los Vipers defeated Los Payasos to claim the Mexican National Atómicos Championship.

- Quarterfinals
- (August 3)

- Semifinals
- (August 13)

- Finals
- (August 23)

Los Nuevos Cadetes del Espacio
(Venum, Ludxor, Discovery, Super Nova)

Los Vipers
(Psicosis, Histeria, Mosco de la Merced, Maniaco)
W

Los Vipers
W

Los Insectos

Los Junior Atómicos
(Perro Aguayo Jr., La Parka Jr., Máscara Sagrada Jr., Sicodelico Jr.)

Los Insectos
(Abeja Africana, La Avispa, La Hormiga, La Mosca)
W

Los Vipers
W

Los Payasos

Los Vatos Locos
(Picudo, Nygma, May Flowers, Charly Manson)
W

Los Orientales
(Kato Kung Lee Jr., Kung Fu Jr., Hong Kong Lee, Full Contact)

Los Vatos Locos

Los Payasos
W

Los Payasos
(Coco Amarillo, Coco Azul, Coco Negro, Coco Rojo)
W

Team Octagón
(Octagón, Pentagón, Duro, Directo)

== Title history ==
Key
No.	Overall reign number
Reign	Reign number for the specific team—reign numbers for the individuals are in parentheses, if different
Days	Number of days held
N/A	Unknown information

No.	Champion	Championship change			Reign statistics		Notes	Ref.
No.	Champion	Date	Event	Location	Reign	Days	Notes	Ref.
Asistencia Asesoría y Administración (AAA)
1	Pierroth Jr. and Los Villanos (Villano III, Villano IV and Villano V)	August 9, 1996	Live event	Ciudad Nezahualcóyotl	1	84	Defeated Damián 666, Hijo del Espectro, Halloween and Karis la Momia in a tournament final to become the first champions.	
—	Vacated	Late 1996	—	—	—	—	Championship vacated when Los Villanos left AAA for Promo Azteca.	
2	Los Vipers (Histeria, Maniaco, Mosco de la Merced and Psicosis)	August 23, 1998	Live event	Azcapotzalco	1	175	Defeated Los Payasos (Coco Amarillo, Coco Azul, Coco Negro and Coco Rojo) in an eight-team tournament final	
3	Los Vatos Locos (Note: Spanish for "The Crazy Guys") (Charly Manson, May Flowers, Nygma and Picudo)	February 14, 1999	Live event	Monterrey, Nuevo León	1	63		
4	Los Junior Atómicos (Note: Spanish for "The Atomic Junior") (Blue Demon Jr., La Parka Jr., Máscara Sagrada Jr. and Perro Aguayo Jr.)	April 18, 1999	Live event	Zapopan, Jalisco	1	152		(Note: Duncan & Will (2000) p. 402, Chapter Mexico: Mexican National Atómicos Title [Peña] Los Juniors: Perro Aguayo Jr., Blue Demon Jr., La Parka Jr., & Mascara Sagrada Jr. 1999/04/18) (Note: ''Lucha 2000 (2004) p. 19, Numero 4 – Blue Demon Jr., Máscara Sagrada Jr., La Parka Jr. y Perro Aguayo Jr. (Los Junior Atómicos) 18 abril 1999, Zapopan [Eng: Number 4 – Blue Demon Jr., Máscara Sagrada Jr., La Parka Jr. and Perro Aguayo Jr. (Los Junior Atómicos) April 18, 1999, Zappopan])
5	Los Vipers (Histeria, Maniaco, Mosco de la Merced and Psicosis)	September 17, 1999	Live event	Mexico City	2	84		
6	Los Vatos Locos (Charly Manson, May Flowers, Nygma and Picudo)	December 10, 1999	Live event	Madero, Tamaulipas	2	127		
7	Los Vipers (Histeria, Maniaco, Mosco de la Merced and Psicosis)	April 15, 2000	Live event	N/A	3	491		
8	Los Regio Guapos (Note: Spanish for "The Hansom Locals") (Hator, Monje Negro Jr., Potro Jr. and Tigre Universitario)	August 19, 2001	Live event	Monterrey, Nuevo León	1	49		(Note: ''Lucha 2000 (2004) p. 19, Numero 8 – Hator, Monje Negro Jr., Potro Jr. y Tigre Universitario 19 augusto 2001, Monterrey [Eng: Number 8 – Hator, Monje Negro Jr., Potro Jr. and Tigre Universitario August 19, 2001, Monterrey])
9	Los Vipers (Histeria, Maniaco, Mosco de la Merced and Psicosis)	October 7, 2001	Live event	Monterrey, Nuevo León	4	47		
10	Los Vatos Locos (Espíritu, Nygma (3), Picudo (3) and Silver Cat)	November 23, 2001	Live event	Mexico City	1	374		
11	Oscar Sevilla and Los Barrio Boys (Note: Spanish for "The Neighborhood Boys") (Alan, Billy Boy and Decnis)	December 2, 2002	Live event	Nuevo Laredo, Tamaulipas	1	228		
12	The Black Family (Chessman, Cuervo, Escoria and Ozz)	July 18, 2003	Live event	Madero, Tamaulipas	1	21		
13	Oscar Sevilla and Los Barrio Boys (Alan, Billy Boy and Decnis)	August 8, 2003	Live event	Puebla, Puebla	2	378		
14	The Black Family (Chessman, Cuervo, Escoria and Ozz)	August 20, 2004	Live event	Puebla, Puebla	2	789		
15	The Mexican Powers (Crazy Boy, Juventud Guerrera, Joe Líder and Psicosis)	October 18, 2006	Live event	Cuernavaca, Morelos	1	214		
16	La Secta del Mesias (Note: Spanish for "The Sect of the Mesiah") (Dark Cuervo (3), Dark Escoria (3), Dark Espíritu (2) and Dark Ozz (3))	May 20, 2007	Live event	Morelia, Michoacán	1	609		
17	Chessman (3) and Los Psycho Circus (Killer Clown, Psycho and Zombie Clown)	January 18, 2009	Live event	Guanajuato, Guanajuato	1	6		
—	Deactivated	January 24, 2009	—	—	—	—	AAA abandoned the championship	

== List of Championship reigns by combined length ==
Rank	Team	No. of reigns	Combined days
1	The Black Family (Chessman, Cuervo, Escoria and Ozz)	2	820
2	Los Vipers (Histeria, Maniaco, Mosco de la Merced and Psicosis)	3	797
3	Oscar Sevilla and Los Barrio Boys (Alan, Billy Boy and Decnis)	2	606
4	La Secta de Mesias (Dark Cuervo, Dark Escoria, Dark Espiritu and Dark Ozz)	1	600
5	Los Vatos Locos (Espíritu, Nygma, Picudo and Silver Cat)	1	374
6	Mexican Powers (Crazy Boy, Juventud Guerrera, Joe Líder and Psicosis)	1	306
7	Los Vatos Locos (Charly Manson, May Flowers, Nygma and Picudo)	2	190
8	Los Junior Atómicos (Blue Demon Jr., La Parka Jr., Máscara Sagrada Jr. and Perro Aguayo Jr.)	1	142
9	Pierroth Jr. and Los Villanos (Villano III, Villano IV and Villano V)	1	84
10	Los Regio Guapos (Hator, Monje Negro Jr., Potro Jr. and Tigre Universitario)	1	46
11	Chessman and Los Psycho Circus (Killer Clown, Psycho Clown and Zombie Clown)	1	16

== List of individual Championship reigns by combined length ==
Rank	Wrestler	No. of reigns	Combined days
1	Cuervo	3	1,420
1	Escoria	3	1,420
1	Ozz	3	1,420
4	Psicosis	5	1,103
5	Espíritu	2	974
6	Chessman	3	836
7	Histeria II	4	797
7	Maniaco	4	797
7	Mosco de la Merced	4	797
10	Nygma	3	654
11	Alan	2	606
11	Billy Boy	2	606
11	Decnis	2	606
11	Oscar Sevilla	2	606
15	Picudo	3	564
16	Silver Cat	1	374
17	Crazy Boy	1	306
17	Joe Líder	1	306
17	Juventud Guerrera	1	306
20	Charly Manson	2	190
20	May Flowers	2	190
22	Blue Demon Jr.	1	142
22	La Parka Jr.	1	142
22	Máscara Sagrada Jr.	1	142
22	Perro Aguayo Jr.	1	142
26	Pierroth Jr.	1	84
26	Villano III	1	84
26	Villano IV	1	84
26	Villano V	1	84
30	Hator	1	46
30	Monje Negro Jr.	1	46
30	Potro Jr.	1	46
30	Tigre Universitario	1	46
34	Killer Clown	1	7
34	Psycho Clown	1	7
34	Zombie Clown	1	7
