= Picudo =

Mexican professional wrestler

Personal information
- Born: Arturo Hernández Herrada; August 3, 1967 Mexico
- Died: August 3, 2018 (aged 51) Mexico
- Parent: Espectro I (father)
- Relatives: Silver Cat (brother); Antonio Peña (cousin)

Professional wrestling career
- Ring names: Devil Rocker; Espectro 2000; Picudo
- Billed height: 1.70 m (5 ft 7 in)
- Billed weight: 88 kg (194 lb)
- Trained by: Espectro I
- Debut: March 2, 1985

Arturo Hernández Herrada (August 3, 1967 – August 3, 2018) was a Mexican professional wrestler who wrestled under the ring name Picudo. He was best known for his appearances in the Mexican professional wrestling promotion Asistencia Asesoría y Administración (AAA) which he had worked for from 1992 to 2009 and again from 2012 to 2013. As Picudo, Hernández was a member of Los Vatos Locos, a Kiss look-alike group of wrestlers, with whom he held the Mexican National Atómicos Championship. In 2012, he returned to AAA under the ring name Devil Rocker, with who he was introduced as part of a group called Los Inferno Rockers (with Machine Rocker, Demon Rocker, Soul Rocker, and Uru Rocker). As both Picudo and Devil Rocker, Hernández wore wrestling gear reminiscent of the elaborate stage costumes of the rock group Kiss.

== Professional wrestling career ==
=== Los Vatos Locos ===
In mid-1998 AAA owner Antonio Peña put together a new group of wrestlers, a stable called Los Vatos Locos (Spanish for "the crazy guys") consisting of Nygma, Charly Manson, May Flowers and Picudo. After joining Los Vatos Locos Nygma changed his appearance slightly, adopting an outfit and a face paint/mask combo inspired by Kiss lead guitarist Ace Frehley's "Spaceman" look. Picudo changed his look to resemble Gene Simmons' "Demon" outfit as well. The team made their first pay-per-view appearance when they defeated Los Vipers (Histeria, Maniaco, Mosco de la Merced and Psicosis II) at the 1998 Verano de Escandalo. The Verano de Escandalo match was just the first encounter in a long storyline feud between the two groups that would last for several years. On February 14, 1999, Los Vatos Locos defeated Los Vipers to win the Mexican National Atómicos Championship. The team successfully defended the championship against Los Vipers at the 1999 Rey de Reyes show. Los Vatos Locos reign with the Atómicos title lasted only 63 days as they lost the championship to Los Junior Atómicos (Blue Demon Jr., La Parka Jr., Máscara Sagrada Jr. and Perro Aguayo Jr.) on April 18, 1999. The Vatos Locos / Los Vipers feud continued through 1999 with the two teams wrestling to a double disqualification at Triplemanía VII in June. Los Vatos Locos finally regained the Atómicos title from Los Vipers at the 1999 Guerra de Titanes show. The group's second Atómicos reign was only slightly longer than their first as they lost the title on April 15, 2000, to Los Vipers. In late 2000 Charly Manson broke away from Los Vatos Locos to join a newly formed group called The Black Family, in his place Los Vatos brought in Espiritu to replace him. In keeping with the "Kiss" theme set by Nygma and Picudo, Espiritu altered his appearance to look more like Paul Stanley's "Starchild" character. This combination of Los Vatos Locos (Nygma, Picudo, May Flowers, and Espiritu) did not last long, as May Flowers left the group in early 2001 to form his own Exóticos group. Los Vatos replaced May Flowers with Silver Cat, a ring persona patterned after Kiss drummer Peter Criss "the Catman" character, making Los Vatos Locos; the group even began carrying instruments to the ring and "perform". On November 23, 2001, the new incarnation of Los Vatos Locos defeated longtime rivals Los Vipers to win the Mexican National Atómicos Championship once more. Los Vatos third title reign lasted for over a year, 374 days, before they lost the titles back to Los Vipers. After losing the Atómicos title Los Vatos Locos featured less prominently on AAA shows, not making a single major show appearance after September 16, 2002, when they appeared at Verano de Escándalo. In 2005 Espiritu left the group to join La Secta de Mesias, keeping a friendly relationship with his old group.

=== Los Inferno Rockers ===
In mid-2012 AAA introduced a new masked trio known as Los Inferno Rockers (Machine Rocker, Devil Rocker and Soul Rocker), a trio of masked, glam rocker inspired wrestlers who resembled the rock band Kiss. It was later verified that the former Tito Santana was under the Soul Rocker mask. The trio was set up as the rivals of Los Psycho Circus (Psycho Clown, Murder Clown and Monster Clown), who at the time had been undefeated for years. They later introduced the 201 cm (6 ft 7 in) tall Uro Rocker to the team, targeting Psycho Clown specifically. It was later revealed that Uro Rocker was supposed to be the main rival of Psycho Clown, but the wrestler playing the part hurt wrestlers he worked with and was quickly dropped from the group.

The group lost to Los Psycho Circus at the 2012 Guerra de Titanes show, their first appearance at a major AAA show. 18 days later the trio wrestled International Wrestling Revolution Group's Los Oficiales (Oficial 911, Oficial AK-47 and Oficial Fierro) in one of the featured matches on the Arena Naucalpan 35th Anniversary Show when the match ended in a double pinfall. In early 2013 Los Inferno Rockers finally defeated Los Psycho Circus, gaining some momentum in their ongoing feud. They repeated the feat at the 2012 Rey de Reyes show, seemingly escalating their feud towards a Lucha de Apuestas, or "bet match" where the teams would put their masks on the line. The Apuestas match never happened and Los Inferno Rockers were soon diverted from Los Psycho Circus. In late 2013, Devil Rocker left AAA and was replaced by Demon Rocker to remain a trio.

== Personal life and death ==
Arturo Hernández Herrada was the son of Espectro I and the older brother of Silver Cat. He was also the cousin of Antonio Peña, the founder of AAA.

Hernández died of diabetes on August 3, 2018, his 51st birthday.

== Championships and accomplishments ==
- Asistencia Asesoría y Administración
  - Mexican National Atómicos Championship (3 times) – with Nygma, May Flowers and Charly Manson (2), with Espiritu, Nygma and Silver Cat (1)

== Luchas de Apuestas record ==
Winner (wager)	Loser (wager)	Location	Event	Date	Notes
Perro Aguayo Jr. (hair)	Picudo (mask)	Naucalpan, State of Mexico	Live event	December 3, 1995	(Note: The two lost a "Relevos Suicida" to Rey Misterio Jr. and Juventud Guerrera and were forced to wrestle each other.)
Perro Aguayo Jr. (hair)	Picudo (hair)	Ciudad Madero, Tamaulipas	Guerra de Titanes	November 19, 1997	(Note: Aguayo, Jr. and Picudo were the last two men in a four-man Steel Cage match that also included Heavy Metal and Sangre Chicana.)
Picudo (hair)	Tonina Viper (hair)	Ciudad Nezahualcóyotl, State of Mexico	Live event	November 3, 2000	
Hombre Sin Miedo (hair)	Picudo (hair)	Nuevo Laredo, Tamaulipas	Live event	July 7, 2008	

== See also ==
- List of premature professional wrestling deaths
