= Histeria (wrestler) =

Mexican professional wrestler

Personal information
- Born: June 10, 1969 (age 57) Mexico
- Relatives: Durango Kid (brother); Naoto Inoki (nephew)

Professional wrestling career
- Ring name(s): Histeria; Histeria Xtreme; Morphosis; Murcielago; Quarterback II; Turako
- Billed height: 1.70 m (5 ft 7 in)
- Billed weight: 86 kg (190 lb)
- Trained by: Blue Panther; Sr. Carmona
- Debut: 1985

Alfonso Peña (born June 10, 1969) is a Mexican professional wrestler best known under the ring name Histeria currently working for Lucha Libre AAA Worldwide (AAA). He also worked for Consejo Mundial de Lucha Libre (CMLL) under the ring name Morphosis. Peña is best known for the 14 years he worked for AAA, until leaving in 2009. He is the second person to wrestle as "Histeria", taking over from the previous wrestler who became known as Super Crazy. There was later a third Histeria wrestling for AAA. Until December 25, 2016, Peña's real name was not a matter of public record, as is often the case with masked wrestlers, but on December 25 he lost a Lucha de Apuestas match to Carístico, which forced him to unmask and reveal his real name per lucha libre (the professional wrestling style originary from Mexico) traditions.

== Professional wrestling career ==
Alfonso Peña made his professional wrestling debut in 1985 and for the next 10 years worked for various promoters on the Mexican independent circuit, without making much of a name for himself. In 1995 he began working for Asistencia Asesoría y Administración (AAA) under the ring name Quarterback II, a football ring character complete with a mask that looked like a football helmet. Initially he was teamed up with Quarterback I, but the team never made much headway.

=== Lucha Libre AAA Worldwide (1997–2010) ===
In 1997 the original Histeria, now known as Super Crazy, left AAA to work for Promo Azteca. AAA owner Antonio Peña decided to reuse the character without publicly acknowledging that a different wrestler was playing the role. Quarterback II was given the outfit and name and from that moment forward became the "official" Histeria and made part of Los Vipers. On August 23, 1998, Histeria, Psicosis, Maniaco and Mosco de la Merced teamed up to participate in a tournament for the vacant Mexican National Atómicos Championship, representing Los Vipers. Los Vipers won the tournament by defeating Los Payasos (Coco Amarillo, Coco Azul, Coco Negro and Coco Rojo) in the finals to win the Atómicos title. Over the following months Los Vipers began a storyline feud with another group called Los Vatos Locos, which at the time consisted of Charly Manson, May Flowers, Nygma and Picudo. On February 14, 1999 Los Vatos Locos defeated Los Vipers to win the Atómicos championship. Los Vipers won the title a second time on September 17, 1999, when they defeated Los Junior Atómicos (Blue Demon, Jr., La Parka, Jr., Mascara Sagrada, Jr. and Perro Aguayo, Jr.). Los Vatos Locos managed to end Los Vipers second reign only three months later as they defeated Psicosis and partners on the undercard of the 1999 Guerra de Titanes show. Los Vipers regained the Atómicos title on April 15, 2000, effectively ending the storyline with Los Vatos Locos. Los Vipers reigned as Atómicos champions for over a year, until they were surprisingly upset by a little known group called Los Regio Guapos (Hator, Monje Negro, Jr., Potro, Jr. and Tigre Universitario) on August 19, 2001. Los Regio Guapos only held the title for under two months before Los Vipers regained the title and began their fourth reign with the Atómicos title. Their fourth reign also turned out to be the last reign for Los Vipers, ending on November 23, 2001, as a new version of Los Vatos Locos (Espiritu, Nygma, Picudo and Silver Cat) defeated them in one of the featured matches of the 2001 Guerra de Titanes.

In 2005 Histeria left Los Vipers and turned tecnico (fan favorite) in 2005. Around the same time the original Psicosis returned to AAA and immediately began a storyline with Psicosis II over the rights to the Psicosis name. The storyline included a Steel Cage match that took place at Triplemanía XIII, but ended in a "no-contest" as Histeria interfered in the match when he attacked both wrestlers. Subsequently the feud over the Psicosis name became a three-way feud between the Original Psicosis, Psicosis II and Histeria. The feud for the Psicosis name ended with Histeria winning a ladder match, earning the rights to the name - rights he handed over to Antonio Peña. Peña would later decide to allow Psicosis II to keep the ring character, making the storyline a moot point. In 2007 Histeria joined Psicosis II and Abismo Negro to reform Los Vipers, this time called Viper's Revolucion. Later on when Mr. Niebla joined the group both Psicosis and Histeria sided with him and kicked Abismo Negro out of the group. They were later joined by Black Abyss, an Abismo Negro clone character. The feud with Abismo Negro was supposed to be settled at Triplemanía XVI in a cage match, but it was cancelled in the weeks leading up to the event, followed by Mr. Niebla leaving AAA. Following Mr. Niebla's defection from AAA Psicosis II, Histeria and Black Abyss were used less frequently and not in any long term storylines.

In the summer of 2009 both Psicosis II and Histeria left AAA, citing their dissatisfaction with the lack of bookings and thus lack of pay. They began wrestling on the independent circuit still using the names Histeria and Psicosis, although they later modified their names to "Histeria Extreme" and "Psicosis Extreme" when AAA started making threats about legal sanctions and introduced Psicosis III and Histeria III. The pair worked for a number of promotions including International Wrestling Revolution Group (IWRG) and were regulars for the Perros del Mal wrestling promotion.

=== Consejo Mundial de Lucha Libre (2010–2017) ===
On April 12, 2010, a contingent of former AAA wrestlers including Histeria, Psicosis II, Maniaco, El Alebrije and Cuije appeared on a Consejo Mundial de Lucha Libre (CMLL) show in Puebla, Puebla. The group drown into the arena in a black SUV and attacked La Sombra, El Hijo del Fantasma and La Máscara after they just finished wrestling. Brazo de Plata, Místico and Jon Strongman tried to help out but were kept away by CMLL rudos Averno, El Texano, Jr. and El Terrible. Following the attack the former AAA wrestlers returned to the SUV and left the arena. The group made several subsequent attacks during CMLL shows, including running in during their Sunday Night Arena México show, indicating that the storyline was not limited to just the Puebla area. After weeks of run-ins the group, dubbed Los Independientes or "The Independents" after the Independent circuit, wrestled their first match for CMLL. In their debut for CMLL on April 26, 2010, El Alebrije, Histeria and Psicosis defeated El Hijo del Fantasma, La Mascara and La Sombra. On May 10, 2010, during a match between Los Independientes and CMLL wrestlers former CMLL and AAA wrestlers Universo 2000 and Máscara Año 2000 ran in to help Los Independientes beat up on their opponents, taking their side in the storyline between independent wrestlers and CMLL. The team was later renamed Los Invasores. During a trios match between El Alebrije, Histeria II and Maniaco and the team of Héctor Garza, Brazo de Plata and Toscano, Garza turned on his team mates and joined Los Invasores. On May 16, 2010, Psicosis wrestled against La Sombra in a match that saw the surprise appearance of both Mr. Águila and Rayo de Jalisco, Jr. Mr. Águila returned to CMLL to side with Los Independientes while Rayo de Jalisco, Jr. ended up siding with CMLL in their war against the outsider group. The following day in Arena Coliseo Olímpico returned to CMLL and attacked Máximo during the main event of the show, at the time it was not clear if he had actually joined the group of outsiders or not. CMLL later held a press conference announcing that they would hold a special Sin Salida event on June 6, 2010, that would center around the Los Invasores vs. CMLL storyline. During the press conference Olímpico was part of the Invasores group. It was also announced that Garza and Mr. Águila were the co-leaders of the group. On July 12, 2010, at the Promociones Gutiérrez 1st Anniversary Show Histeria participated in a match where 10 men put their mask on the line in a match that featured five pareja incredibles teams, with the losing team being forced to wrestle each other with their mask on the line. His partner in the match was La Sombra, facing off against the teams of Atlantis and Olímpico, Místico and El Oriental, El Alebrije and Volador Jr., Último Guerrero and Averno. La Sombra and Histeria was the first team to escape the match. In the end Místico defeated El Oriental to unmask him. Histeria was one of 12 men who put their mask on the line as part of a 12-man steel cage match in the main event of the 2010 Infierno en el Ring. He ended up in the final four of the match, but instead of supporting fellow rudo Doctor X he left the cage to save his own mask for the second time that week. In the end Ángel de Oro defeated Fabián el Gitano in the Lucha de Apueta (bet match) portion of the match to unmask him. On August 16, 2010, it was announced that Histeria was one of 14 men putting their mask on the line in a Luchas de Apuestas steel cage match, the main event of the CMLL 77th Anniversary Show. Histeria was the fifth man to leave the steel cage at the same time as his fellow Invasor El Alebrije, keeping both their masks safe. Both Histeria and El Alebrije returned to the cage to help their partners but were eventually removed by officials. The match came down to La Sombra pinning Olímpico to unmask him.

=== Legal action ===
In early April, 2010 Histeria and El Alebrije sought legal action against AAA over the issues of name and ring character ownership as well as unfair termination by AAA. The two claim that they have wrestled for 13 years to create the characters and thus own them. The parties met in Mexico City's Board of Conciliation and Arbitration to see if a settlement can be reached or if the matter will be taken to court. The parties met for a second arbitration meeting in late April, 2010. This time the plaintiff group was joined by Latin Lover who, like Alebrije, Histeria and the others, claimed that he should be allowed to use the name since he's worked as Latin Lover for 18 years and thus should be allowed to continue using it. After the meeting it was stated that all parties involved were cooperating over the matter.

In January 2012, CMLL repackaged both Histeria and Alebrije, with Histeria returning to performing under his old Morphosis gimmick.

=== Return to AAA (2017–present) ===
In 2017, Peña left CMLL and made his return to AAA, returning during TripleManía XXV during the Torneo TripleManía XXV. Then, he joined Psicosis II to reform the tag team Los Vipers.

== Championships and accomplishments ==
- Asistencia Asesoría y Administración
  - Mexican National Atomicos Championship (4 times) - with Psicosis II, Mosco de la Merced II, and Maniaco (4)
- Other titles
  - Arena San Juan Pantitlan Welterweight Championship (1 time)
- Other titles
  - UWA World Junior Light Heavyweight Championship (1 time)

== Luchas de Apuestas record ==
Winner (wager)	Loser (wager)	Location	Event	Date	Notes
Histeria (mask)	Demonio Negro (mask)	N/A	Live event	N/A	
Histeria (mask)	Lover Boy (mask)	N/A	Live event	N/A	
Histeria (mask)	Blue Espana (hair)	N/A	Live event	N/A	
Histeria, Psicosis II, and Mosco De La Merced II (masks)	Pandillero I, Pandillero II, and Pandillero III (mask)	Tijuana, Baja California	Live event	N/A	
El Oriental (hair)	Histeria (hair)	Neza, Mexico State	Live event	February 22, 2002	(Note: Lucha en Reves: hair vs. hair match between masked wrestlers)
Histeria (mask)	El Gallego (hair)	San Luis Potosí, San Luis Potosí	Live event	March 27, 2002	
Hijo de Cien Caras (hair)	Histeria (hair)	Nuevo Laredo, Tamaulipas	Live event	October 26, 2009	(Note: Multi-man cage match where masked wrestlers risked their hair. Match also included Maniaco, Psicosis II, Máscara Año 2000, Jr. and Máscara Año 2000)
Carístico (mask)	Histeria	Tijuana, Baja California, Mexico	Promotora El Cholo Show	December 25, 2016	
Pagano (hair)	Histeria 2.0 (hair)	Mazatlan, Sinaloa, Mexico	AAA show	August 18, 2019	(Note: Three way match that also included Chessman)
