= Los Vipers =

Professional wrestling stable

Stable
- Members: Abismo Negro Jr. Psicosis (II); Taurus (II); Histeria (IV)/Bengala (IV); Chik Tormenta
- Name(s): Los Vipers Extreme; Los Vipers Primera Clase; Vipers Revolucion; Los Vipers 2.0; Los Mini Vipers; Los Nuevos Vipers
- Former members: Cibernetico; Abismo Negro; Histeria; Histeria II; Mosco de la Merced; Mosco de la Merced II; Maniaco; Electroshock; Pentagón; Shiiba; El Cuervo; Tokyo Viper; Antifaz; Mr. Niebla; Extreme Tiger; Charly Manson; Escorpion Negro; Kaoma Jr. Black Abyss; Psicosis III; Histeria III; Amnesia; Corsario Negro Jr. Arez (wrestler); Látigo; Toxin; El Fiscal; Mini Psicosis; Mini Histeria; Mosquito De La Merced; Mini Abismo Negro; Mini Histeria II; Mini Psicosis II
- Debut: 1997

Los Vipers is a professional wrestling stable, which has existed in various incarnations in the Mexican wrestling promotions Asistencia Asesoría y Administración (AAA) since 1997. The group has consistently been presented as a Rudo (bad guy) stable. The group was founded by Cibernético and has featured a large number of wrestlers over the years. Over the years the group has also been known as Los Vipers Extreme, Los Vipers Primera Clase and Vipers Revolucion.

== History ==
The foundation to Los Vipers was laid in the beginning of 1997, several months before Los Vipers was unveiled. The basis of Los Vipers was created when AAA formed a group where most of the members would go on to form Los Vipers.

=== Los Rudos de la Galaxia ===
In early 1997 AAA owner Antonio Peña decided to create a rúdo group to feud with the popular Los Cadetes del Espacio ("Space Cadets") group of young, high-flying wrestlers. Peña repackaged several wrestlers to create Los Rudos de la Galaxia ("The Villains of the Galaxy") a group consisting of Abismo Negro, Maniaco, Mosco de la Merced, Histeria and Mach-1. The Cadetes del Espacio vs. Rudos de la Galaxia was featured on a long number of AAA shows and even made its way to the United States through a working relationship between AAA and the World Wrestling Federation and was featured on both Raw is War and WWF Shotgun Saturday Night.

=== Los Vipers ===
In August, 1997 Cibernético unveiled a new stable called Los Vipers, besides himself the group consisted of former Rudos de la Galaxia members Abismo Negro, Maniaco, Mosco de la Merced and Histeria. The core group was joined by Psicosis II and Electroshock as well as Los Mini Vipers, Mini-Estrella Mini Abismo Negro, Mini Histeria (Note: Not the wrestler currently working as Mini Histeria in AAA) and Mosquito de la Merced. Not long after Los Vipers was formed AAA had to replace the original Histeria, who became Super Crazy with a new Histeria. Only a short time later AAA also had to replace the original Mosco de la Merced as well, when he left the promotion, with a new Mosco de la Merced, sometimes referred to as Mosco de la Merced II. (Note: The original Mosco de la Merced now wrestles as X-Fly since he did not hold the trademark to the Mosco de la Merced character.) Los Vipers was a huge hit, they were a group of wrestlers people would gladly paid to see in the hopes that the good guys would beat them. The group worked several heated storylines against groups such as Los Payasos (Spanish for "The Clowns"; a group of wrestlers all dressing like clowns) as well as groups such as Los Vatos Locos ("The Crazy guys") and Los Junior Atómicos.

On August 23, 1998, Mosco de la Merced, Maniaco, Psicosis II and Histeria teamed up to participate in a tournament for the vacant Mexican National Atómicos Championship, representing Los Vipers. Los Vipers won the tournament by defeating Los Payasos (Coco Amarillo, Coco Azul, Coco Negro and Coco Rojo) in the finals to win the Atómicos title. After disposing of Los Payasos Los Vipers turned their attention towards Los Vatos Locos, which at the time consisted of Charly Manson, May Flowers, Nygma and Picudo. On February 14, 1999 Los Vatos Locos defeated Los Vipers to win the Atómicos championship. On May 2, 1999 Abismo Negro and Electroshock teamed up to defeat Perro Aguayo and Perro Aguayo, Jr. to win the Mexican National Tag Team Championship. When Los Vatos Locos lost the Atómicos title to Los Junior Atómicos, a group of second generation luchadors, Los Vipers were the first to claim a title match against the new champions. Los Vipers won the title a second time on September 17, 1999 when they defeated Los Junior Atómicos (Blue Demon, Jr., La Parka, Jr., Mascara Sagrada, Jr. and Perro Aguayo, Jr.). By late 1999 Los Vipers began fighting amongst themselves as Abismo Negro made a bid to become the leader of Los Vipers. The storyline led to the creation of two separate Vipers factions. Cibernetico led a group called Los Vipers Primera Clase ("The First Class Vipers") consisting of himself Psicosis II, Histeria, Mosco De La Merced, Maniaco, Mini Psicosis, Mosquito De La Merced and Mini Histeria. Abismo Negro's group was known as Los Vipers Extreme and besides himself featured Electro Shock, Pentagon, Shiiba, El Cuervo and Mini Abismo Negro. In the midst of the internal turmoil Abismo Negro and Electrochok lost the Mexican National Tag Team Championship to Hator and the Panther. Cibernetico's Vipers Primera Clase lost the Atómicos title as Los Vatos Locos ended their second reign after only three months by defeating Psicosis II, Maniaco, Mosco de la Merced and Histeria on the undercard of the 1999 Guerra de Titanes show. After several months of tension between the Vipers factions the storyline was suddenly dropped and the feuding factions reunited, dropping Pentagón, Shiiba and El Cuervo from the group but adding Tokyo Viper to the group. Los Vipers regained the Atómicos title on April 15, 2000 effectively ending the storyline with Los Vatos Locos for the time being. With the internal struggles in Los Vipers settled Abismo Negro and Electroshock focused on regaining the tag team titles, which they accomplished on May 7, 2000 by defeating Hator and the Panther. The team only held onto the title for 63 days before losing the belts to the duo of Perro Aguayo, Jr. and Héctor Garza.

Not longer after Los Vipers reunited, Cibernético formed a new group called Lucha Libre Latina (LLL), a group intent on taking over AAA that was inspired by World Championship Wrestling's New World Order. Los Vipers became a subgroup within LLL, and Abismo Negro assumed leadership of Los Vipers after Cibernético. Los Vipers reigned as Atómicos champions for over a year, until they were surprisingly upset by a little known group called Los Regio Guapos (Hator, Monje Negro, Jr., Potro, Jr. and Tigre Universitario) on August 19, 2001. Los Regio Guapos only held the title for under two months before Los Vipers regained the title and began their fourth reign with the Atómicos title. Their fourth reign also turned out to be the last reign for Los Vipers, ending on November 23, 2001 as a new version of Los Vatos Locos (Espiritu, Nygma, Picudo and Silver Cat) defeated them in one of the featured matches of the 2001 Guerra de Titanes. As time passed the size of Los Vipers diminished until it was mainly Maniaco, Histeria, Psicosis II and Mosco de la Merced representing the group. Los Vipers took part in an eight-man Steel cage match at Triplemanía X against Los Diabolicos (Mr. Condor, Ángel Mortal and El Gallego) and Gran Apache where the last wrestler in the cage would lose either his mask or be shaved bald. Maniaco ended up as the last man in the ring and was forced to unmask. Following Maniaco's mask loss he departed AAA. Over the summer of 2004 Los Vipers, in this case Mosco, Histeria and Psicosis II became involved in a feud with Heavy Metal, El Intocable and Zorro that led to a Steel Cage match at Verano de Escandalo 2004 in which the last man in the cage would be unmasked or have his hair shaved off. This time it was Mosco de la Merced who was the last man in the ring and was forced to unmask per Lucha libre traditions. Following the mask loss Mosco de la Merced left AAA. Over the summer of 2004 LLL was phased out in favor of a new super group known as La Legión Extranjera or the Foreign Legion in English, which meant that Los Vipers now regularly teamed with foreign wrestlers, especially NWA-TNA performers such as Abyss. Los Vipers ended in 2005 when Histeria turned on Psicosis II, disbanding the group.

=== Vipers Revolucion ===
In the spring of 2006 Los Vipers was reborn, this time under the name Vipers Revolucion, the group featured Abismo Negro, Electroshock, Histeria, Psicosis II, Charly Manson and Antifaz. Psicosis II left the group not long after it was formed, turning on them to join a group called the Mexican Powers (Juventud Guerrera, Joe Líder and Crazy Boy). During the feud between Vipers Revolucion and the Mexican Powers Extreme Tiger briefly joined the group, only to leave AAA all together a few months later. Later Psicosis II would turn on the Mexican Powers and return to Vipers Revolucion. Electrshock left the group to be a full-time member of La Legión while Charly Manson turned técnico (good guy) and joined up with Cibernético and Chessman to form "Los Hell Brothers". When Mr. Niebla jumped from rival promotion Consejo Mundial de Lucha Libre to join AAA he became a part of Vipers Revolucion and instantly began vying for leadership. This led to several clashes between Abismo Negro and Mr. Niebla, resulting in the rest of Vipers Revolucion siding with Mr. Niebla, kicking Abismo Negro out of the group. In late 2007, AAA created a ring persona for a new wrestler called Black Abyss; the gimmick featured the same mask and attire as Negro and used a similar wrestling style to Negro as well. Initially, it was believed that this was done because there were rumors of him jumping to CMLL or to cover several no-shows.

During the fall of 2008, AAA pushed the storyline further by having Black Abyss "injure" Negro with his own trademark move the "Martinete" (Tombstone piledriver). Abismo Negro was scheduled to take part in Triplemanía XVI in a match where he would face Los Vipers (Psicosis, Histeria, Black Abyss and Mr. Niebla) in a cage match, but in the weeks leading up to the show Abismo Negro suffered an injury and the match had to be cancelled, AAA used the attack at Rey de Reyes as a storyline explanation of why the match did not take place. At the 2008 Guerra de Titanes, Abismo Negro returned to challenge Los Vipers' Revolution and specifically Black Abyss. Subsequently, the storyline between Negro and Black Abyss seemed to be building to a Luchas de Apuestas match between the two, with their masks on the line. Both Abismo Negro and Black Abyss were booked in the same four-way elimination match qualifier at the Rey de Reyes 2009 event. Negro was able to eliminate Black Abyss from the match but was in turn eliminated by Latin Lover.

The storyline with Abismo Negro ended when Abismo Negro unexpectedly died in March, 2009 which led to AAA not using Vipers Revolucion much. Black Abyss continued to compete in AAA under the Black Abyss name, even after Abismo Negro's death. In the months following Abismo Negro's death both Psicosis II and Histeria, the two core members of Vipers Revolucion, left AAA citing their dissatisfaction with the lack of matches they were booked in and thus the salary they were denied.

=== Los Vipers 2.0 ===
In December 2009 AAA brought Vipers Revolucion back to life. They had Black Abyss act as the leader of the group and brought in two new wrestlers to work as Histeria and Psicosis, making them Histeria III and Psicosis III. They were also joined by Amnesia to make them a four man group. The group worked for a short time but after February 5, 2010 they disappeared from AAA bookings, possibly connected to the pending legal action between AAA and Histeria/Psicosis over the use of the names that was launched shortly after the new Vipers Revolucion disappeared. In October 2010, Black Abyss left AAA.

=== Los Mini Vipers ===
After being a part of Los Vipers for years Mini Abismo Negro struck out on his own when Vipers Revolucion kicked Abismo Negro out of the group and formed a group called Los Mini Vipers with himself, Mini Histeria and Mini Psicosis, all mascota versions of the three longest running members of Los Vipers.

=== Los Nuevos Vipers ===
After months of Abismo Negro Jr., Chik Tormenta, Arez, Latigo and Toxin teaming up as a group it was at AAA's Héroes Inmortales XIV event that it was made official that they would be known as Los Nuevos Vipers (The New Vipers) announcing it in the middle of the ring when all of a sudden Psicosis II makes a surprise return to announce he would be their mentor and has a surprise in the near future, after showing a mysterious but predictable silhouette on the titan tron. In Triplemanía Regia II after a lot of controversy Cibernetico makes his return to AAA and says he is going after Konnan to make him pay for all his corruption in the company, but not only that he also returned to support and lead the new wrestlers that carry the legacy of the group he created.

== Championships and accomplishments ==
- Asistencia Asesoría y Administración
  - AAA World Mini-Estrella Championship (2 times) – Mini Abismo Negro (1) and Mini Psicosis (1)
  - AAA Mascot Tag Team Championship (1 time) – Abismo Negro with Mini Abismo Negro
  - AAA World Mixed Tag Team Championship (1 time) – Chik Tormenta with Arez
  - AAA World Trios Championship (1 time) – Abismo Negro Jr., Psicosis and Toxin
  - LLL Mini-Estrellas Championship (1 time) – Mini Abismo Negro
  - Mexican National Atómicos Championship (5 times) – Histeria II, Maniaco, Mosco de la Merced II and Psicosis II (4)
  - Mexican National Middleweight Championship (2 times) – Abismo Negro (1), Psicosis II (1)
  - Mexican National Mini-Estrella Championship (2 times) – Mini Abismo Negro
  - Mexican National Tag Team Championship (3 times) – Fuerza Guerrera with Mosco de la Merced (Note: The original Mosco de la Merced won the title with Fuerza Guerrera but was replaced with Mosco II during the reign without it being made public knowledge, the reign is considered one continuous reign despite Mosco II not winning the title.) and Abismo Negro with Electroshock (2)
