= Black Abyss =

Mexican professional wrestler

Personal information
- Born: December 20, 1972 (age 53) Mexicali, Baja California, Mexico

Professional wrestling career
- Ring name(s): Ángel Mensajero; Nautilus; Triple A (II); Black Abyss/Abismo Negro II
- Trained by: Manuel Hernandez; Principe Negro; Caudillo Jr. El Apache; Abismo Negro
- Debut: December 1990

Black Abyss (born December 20, 1972, in Mexicali Bc, México ) is a Mexican professional wrestler best known for time as a rudo in Asistencia Asesoría y Administración (AAA). He is currently working as Black Abyss or sometimes known as Abismo Negro II.

== Professional wrestling career ==
Wrestled in the independent with an unknown gimmick until 1996 he was known to have work as Ángel Mensajero which he still uses today. His gimmick Nautilus came into AAA as part of their "Nueva Imagen" campaign as a tecnico. He didn't stick around too long though.

After doing an Abismo Negro knock off gimmick in the independents, he returned to AAA as Black Abyss and became a rudo for the first time in his wrestling career. The evil Vipers Revolucion promoted clone of Abismo Negro. The feud between Abismo Negro and Vipers Revolution never stayed on track because Abismo Negro had his issues making AAA TV tapings. Black Abyss continues as a member of the Vipers. During Abismo's summer of 2008 departure from the company, the Vipers as a group disappeared from television during long stretches of 2008 as well. Black Abyss disappeared from TV, then was brought back to TV when Abismo Negro returned. The two feuded thru the spring of 2009 until Abismo Negro's passing. Black Abyss has appeared only a couple times on TV since then, still as a rudo, but seemingly in limbo. Black Abyss has stated about continuing with the character to honor the memory of Abismo Negro, but AAA hasn't shown a lot of interest in using it on TV whenever the original hasn't been around. In October 2010 it was reported that Black Abyss had left AAA.

== Championships and accomplishments ==
- Other titles
  - DWA Championship (1 time)
  - X-LAW Tag Team Championship (1 time) - with Mr. Tempest

== Luchas de Apuestas record ==
Winner (wager)	Loser (wager)	Location	Event	Date	Notes
Angel Mensajero (mask)	Negro Azteca (hair)	Baja California	Live event	1997	
Angel Mensajero (mask)	El Brazo (hair)	Baja California	Live event	May 6, 2006	
Angel Mensajero (mask)	Tigre Leon (mask)	Tijuana, Baja California	Live event	January 1, 2007	
Black Abyss (mask)	Enfermero, Jr. (hair)	Tijuana, Baja California	Live event	June 22, 2012	(Note: The team lost a Parejas Suicidas tournament and were forced to wrestle each other.)
