= Dark Cuervo =

Mexican Luchador

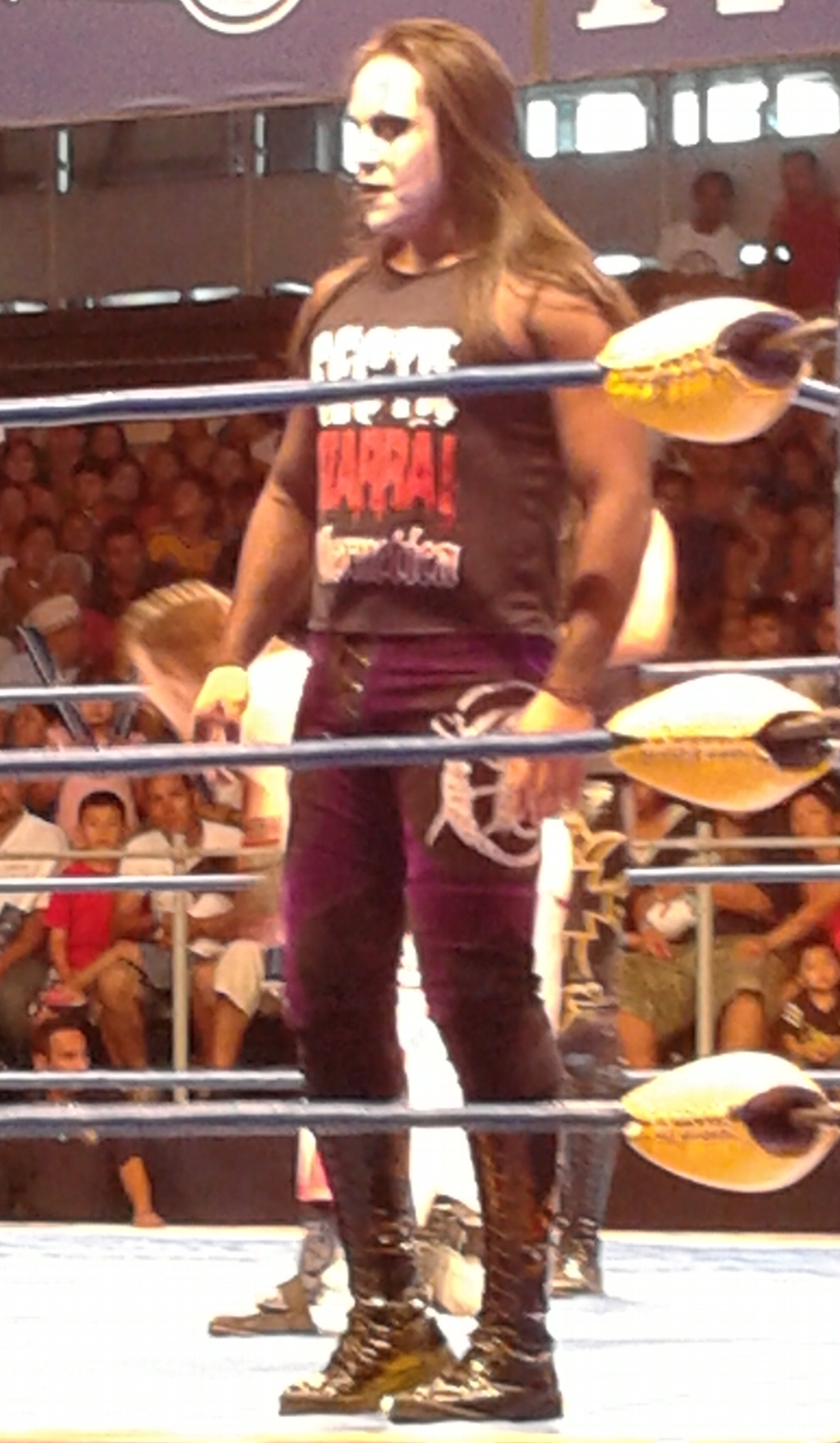
- Cuervo in August 2012

Personal information
- Born: Jaime Ignacio Tirado Correa; January 4, 1974 (age 52) Toluca, Mexico State, Mexico

Professional wrestling career
- Ring name(s): Dark Cuervo; Cuervo; Heavy Dracula
- Billed height: 1.72 m (5 ft 8 in)
- Billed weight: 87 kg (192 lb)
- Trained by: Dos Caras; Impala
- Debut: February 28, 1996

Jaime Ignacio Tirado Correa (born January 4, 1974) is a Mexican professional wrestler, who is best known as Cuervo or Dark Cuervo. He works for Lucha Libre AAA Worldwide (AAA) and has been part of The Black Family since it was formed in 2001 by Charly Manson. During his time in the Black Family La Cuervo has been a member of both Lucha Libre Latina (LLL) and La Secta del Mesías, its predecessor La Secta Cibernetica and La Legión Extranjera but now the Black Family is its own independent entity.

== Professional wrestling career ==
Jaime Correa trained under Dos Caras and Impala before making his professional wrestling debut in 1996. Correa debuted as El Cuervo (Spanish for "The Crow"), a Goth inspired character complete with white face paint and black markings. In 1998 Coerra briefly used the name "Heavy Dracula" but abandoned it after only a few months and reverted to El Cuervo. In 1999 El Cuervo became a member of Abismo Negro's short lived stable Los Vipers Extreme, a splinter of the Los Vipers group that feuded with the other faction Los Vipers Primera Clase led by Cibernético. After only a few months the two Viper stables were reunited but without El Cuervo.

=== The Black Family ===
In the early parts of 2001 El Cuervo teamed up with other four other wrestlers that all used a similar gimmick, look and attitude as Cuervo to form the stable the Black Family. The other wrestlers were Charly Manson, Escoria and Ozz. Early on in the stable's lifetime Charly Manson suffered a grave injury after falling from a ladder during a match which put Manson out of wrestling for a long period. The Black Family brought in Chessman to be the fourth member. Around the time of Chessman joining the Black Family became part of Lucha Libre Latina (LLL), the Mexican version of the New World Order, a group led by Chessman's long-time friend Cibernético. Even though they were part of a much larger group the four men still worked as a unit, a stable within the stable.

On July 18, 2003 the Black Family won their first championship as a unit when they defeated Oscar Sevilla and Los Barrio Boys for the Atómicos title, but their run only lasted 31 days before Sevilla and Los Barrio Boys regained the titles. It would be just over a year before the Black Family got another opportunity to hold the titles as they won them on August 20, 2004.

=== La Secta ===
In 2005 Cibernético formed a new group called La Secta Cibernetica that included his friends Charly Manson and Chessman and through Chessman's membership the Black Family was also invited to join this new supergroup. The group assisted Cibernético in his fight with La Parka (the AAA version), being unable to prevent him from being unmasked at Triplemanía XII. Later in the year Muerta Cibernetica was brought in to get revenge on La Parka. When Cibernético suffered a severe knee injury Muerta Cibernetica took over the group and kicked Cibernético out. After holding the Atómicos titles for 789 days the Black Family lost to the Mexican Powers (Crazy Boy, Juventud Guerrera, Joe Lider and Psicosis II) on October 18, 2006. Not long after they lost the tag team titles Chessman turned "Technicó" and sided with Cibernético and Charly Manson to form "Los Hell Brothers" fighting against La Secta, now known as "La Secta del Mesias" as Muerta Cibernetica changed his name to "El Mesias". With Chessman out of the Black Family the team invited Espiritu to leave Los Vatos Locos and join them, the invitation was accepted without any friction from the rest of Los Vatos Locos. Sometime in 2006 all four members of the Black Family changed their names slightly adding the word "Dark" in front of their names, thus Cuervo became Dark Cuervo although the names are use interchangeably.

In early 2007 Cuervo teamed with Dark Ozz to compete in a 16 team tournament to crown the first ever AAA World Tag Team Champions. in the end four teams met in the finals at the Rey de Reyes 2007 event. Dark Ozz and Dark Cuervo defeated The Mexican Powers (Crazy Boy and Joe Lider), Los Guapos (Alan Stone and Zumbido) and Real Fuerza Aérea AAA (Pegasso and Super Fly) in an elimination match to win the titles. Cuervo became a double champion when the Black Family won the Atómicos titles from the Mexican Powers on May 20, 2007. The dual title situation only lasted until Triplemanía XV where the Mexican Powers team of Crazy Boy and Joe Lider won the Tag Team Championship.

=== End of La Secta ===
In early 2008 El Mesias and the rest of La Secta was kicked out of La Legión Extranjera with La Legión putting El Mesias out of commission for a while. When El Mesias returned to active competition tension began to build between the Black Family and El Mesias. The tensions culminated after El Mesias lost a Steel Cage "Street Fight" Match to Vampiro at Verano de Escandalo (2008) which led to the Black Family attacking El Mesias officially severing their relationship. After breaking up La Secta del Mesias the group began to feud with El Mesias. DUring the fall and winter of 2008 both Charly Manson and Chessman made hints at them possibly returning to the Black Family but Manson got injured and taken off TV while Chessman turned on the group after feinting friendship. On January 9, 2009 Chessman teamed with the Psycho Circus (Killer Clown, Psycho Clown and Zombie Clown) to end the Black Family's Atómicos title run. In November and December 2010 Cuervo and Ozz took part in All Japan Pro Wrestling's World's Strongest Tag Determination League. The duo managed to win four out of their eight matches in the tournament and finished fifth out of nine teams in the final standings.

=== El Inframundo ===
In May 2011, Cuervo, Ozz and Espíritu joined La Parka and Drago to form technico group El Inframundo ("The Underworld") and battle Cibernético's Los Bizarros, which also included their former stable mate Escoria. Cuervo and Ozz returned to All Japan Pro Wrestling in September 2011 and, after Ozz pinned World Tag Team Champion KENSO in a six-man tag team match, were named the number one contenders to KENSO's and The Great Muta's title. On October 9 at Héroes Inmortales, La Parka turned rudo and jumped to Los Perros del Mal. On October 23, Cuervo and Ozz defeated Muta and KENSO to win the World Tag Team Championship. Cuervo and Ozz returned to AAA on December 16 at Guerra de Titanes, along with Vampiro, who replaced La Parka as the leader of El Inframundo. After returning to Japan, Cuervo and Ozz lost the World Tag Team Championship to Manabu Soya and Takao Omori in their fourth title defense on March 20, 2012.

=== La Secta Bizarra Cibernetica ===
On August 18, 2012, the former members of La Secta came together with former leader Cibernético's stable Los Bizarros to form La Secta Bizarra Cibernetica. As part of La Secta Bizarra's rivalry with Los Perros del Mal, the two groups faced off on October 7 at Héroes Inmortales in a Domo de la Muerte, where Cuervo was the last person to escape the cage, forcing Halloween to have his head shaved bald. On August 2, 2013, the entire La Secta turned on Cibernético, forming a new rudo version of the stable. On September 11, Cuervo returned to All Japan Pro Wrestling, losing to Low Ki in the first round of the 2013 Ōdō Tournament. For the rest of the tour, which lasted until September 23, Cuervo worked undercard tag team matches, suffering pinfall losses in most of them. In November, Cuervo, along with Ozz, returned to take part in the 2013 World's Strongest Tag Determination League, where they finished with a record of two wins and five losses, failing to advance from their block.

=== Los Xinetez and Dark Family ===
On January 22, 2016, at Guerra de Titanes, Cuervo, Scoria and El Zorro won the vacant AAA World Trios Championship. They lost the title to OGT (Averno, Chessman and Ricky Marvin) on November 4.

On March 31, 2017, Cuervo and Scoria won the AAA World Tag Team Championship. They held the title for two months.

== Championships and accomplishments ==
- All Japan Pro Wrestling
  - World Tag Team Championship (1 time) – with Dark Ozz
- Lucha Libre AAA Worldwide
  - AAA World Tag Team Championship (4 times) – with Ozz (1) and Scoria (3)
  - AAA World Trios Championship (1 time) – with Dark Scoria and El Zorro
  - Mexican National Atómicos Championship (3 times) – with Escoria, Ozz and Chessman (2), Dark Escoria, Dark Ozz and Dark Espiritu (1)
- Kaoz Lucha Libre
  - Kaoz Tag Team Championship (1 time) – (with Escoria)
- Pro Wrestling Illustrated
  - PWI ranked him #320 of the top 500 singles wrestlers in the PWI 500 in 2016

== Luchas de Apuestas record ==
Winner (wager)	Loser (wager)	Location	Event	Date	Notes
El Cuervo (hair)	Kung Fu (hair)	N/A	Live event	N/A	
El Cuervo (hair)	El Goelador (hair)	N/A	Live event	N/A	
El Cuervo and ??(hair)	Los Mohicanos (I and II) (hair)	Tlalnepantla, State of Mexico	Live event	N/A	
El Cuervo (hair)	Tony Rivera (hair)	Naucalpan, State of Mexico	Live event	November 3, 1996	
El Cuervo (hair)	Cobra (hair)	Naucalpan, State of Mexico	Live event	March 2, 1997	
El Cuervo (hair)	El Mohicano Jr. (hair)	Tlalnepantla, State of Mexico	Live event	March 15, 998	
El Cuervo (hair)	Mohawk (hair)	Tlalnepantla, State of Mexico	Live event	December 17, 1999	
Dark Cuervo (hair)	Halloween (hair)	San Luis Potosí, San Luis Potosí	Héroes Inmortales	October 7, 2012	(Note: Domo de la Muerte, where Dark Cuervo, Cibernético, Dark Ozz and Jack Evans faced Los Perros del Mal (Halloween, El Hijo del Perro Aguayo, Psicosis and Teddy Hart).)
Angélico (hair) and Jack Evans (hair)	Dark Cuervo (hair) and Dark Escoria (hair)	Monterrey, Nuevo León	Verano de Escándalo	June 14, 2015	(Note: Steel cage match.)
