= Charly Manson =

Mexican professional wrestler (born 1975)

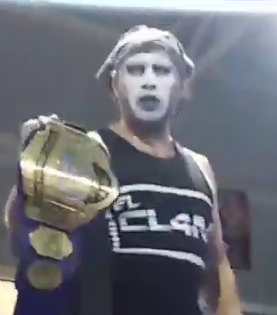
- Manson with the GCW tag championship belt

Personal information
- Born: Jesús Luna Pozos; February 18, 1975 (age 51) Torreón, Coahuila, Mexico

Professional wrestling career
- Ring name(s): Brujería; C. Manson; Charlie Manson; Charly Malice; Charly Manson; Sharlie Rockstar; Dinamita Luna; El Cazador; Jim Kata
- Billed height: 1.75 m (5 ft 9 in)
- Billed weight: 82 kg (181 lb)
- Trained by: Hombre Bala
- Debut: October 1990

Jesús Luna Pozos (born February 18, 1975) is a Mexican professional wrestler. He primarily works on the Mexican independent circuit as Sharlie Rockstar, where he competes as a member of The Kl4n. Pozos is best known under the ring name Charly Manson, as well as numerous variations of that name, with his attire, gimmick and ring name being heavily inspired by American rockstar Marilyn Manson. He has spent the majority of his career competing in Asistencia Asesoría y Administración (AAA), but has also competed in International Wrestling Revolution Group (IWRG) and Los Perros del Mal, as well as numerous other independent promotions.

In 2001 Manson suffered a career-threatening, near-fatal injury that required surgical steel to be inserted into his body. In 2008 Manson suffered an injury to the same region once more, bending the surgical steel which required more steel to be inserted surgically. Pozos worked for Asistencia Asesoría y Administración (AAA) for over 10 years and was part of such groups as Los Vatos Locos, The Black Family and Los Hell Brothers. Manson left AAA in late 2009 after a public falling out with AAA management and began working on the Mexican independent circuit and for CMLL as part of Los Invasores, however, in December 2010 he made surprise jump back to AAA.

Pozos was imprisoned in June 2011 for assaulting two police officers and in August 2013 sentenced to seven years and four months in prison. Following his release in 2015, he returned to professional wrestling with Lucha Libre Elite as Sharlie Rockstar.

== Professional wrestling career ==
Pozos was trained for his professional wrestling career by Hombre Bala (Aurelio Ortiz Villavicencio, the current Monsther) and made his debut in October 1990. He started out as an Enmascarado (masked wrestler) known as Jim Kata. He would later work under names such as Dinamita Luna (Spanish for "Dynamite Moon"), El Cazador (Spanish for "The Hunter") and Brujería (Spanish for "Witchcraft") but none of the gimmicks were successful for Pozos.

=== Asistencia Asesoría y Administración ===
March 10, 1998, Pozos made his debut for Asistencia Asesoría y Administración (AAA) where he adopted the gimmick of "Charly Manson", playing upon the look and personality of American musician Marilyn Manson complete with white facepaint, clothes and entrance music (Manson's Rock Is Dead). Manson was chosen to be one of the original members of the stable called Los Vatos Locos (Spanish for "The Crazy Guys") alongside Picudo, Nygma and May Flowers. Los Vatos Locos immediately started a feud (storyline) with another AAA based stable known as Los Vipers and had many 4 on 4, or "Atómicos", tag matches. On February 14, 1999, Los Vatos Locos defeated the Los Vipers team of Histeria, Maniaco, Mosco de la Merced and Psicosis II to win the Mexican National Atómicos Championship. Their first run with the Atómicos title was short lived as they were defeated by Los Juniors (Blue Demon, Jr., La Parka, Jr., Máscara Sagrada, Jr. and Perro Aguayo, Jr.) only 63 days later. Before 1999 was up they won the Atómicos championship once again having defeated Los Vipers for the gold once again. Their second run would last 127 days before they lost the titles back to Los Vipers on April 15, 2000.

Shortly after losing the Atómicos Championship, Charly Manson left Los Vatos Locos to create his own stable called the Black Family. The Black Family initially featured Chessman, Escoria and Cuervo and was soon joined by Ozz, all of whom shared Manson's Goth-inspired look. On March 30, 2001, Manson suffered a career threatening injury that almost took his life. During a Tables, Ladders, and Chairs match, Manson was pushed off a ladder to the floor. The plan was that he would have his fall broken by a stack of tables but, unfortunately, the tables were not close enough and Manson dropped directly onto the concrete floor. The impact broke his femur and gave him a hard blow to the head. The femur had to be strengthened by a surgical steel plate. In late 2001 Charly Manson returned to the promotion, while still not fully recovered, and began a war of words with the Black Family as Chessman had taken over his leadership role in Manson's absence. Manson displayed a much more cautious ring style upon his return.

=== International Wrestling Revolution Group ===
When Charly Manson was finally cleared to return to the ring, he did not return to AAA but instead began working for another Mexican promotion called International Wrestling Revolution Group (IWRG). Manson announced that he, his brother Electroshock and Pentagón Black was the new Black Family denouncing the group that Chessman led. The group soon disintegrated as Electroshock returned to AAA. Manson's only real feud in IWRG was with a wrestler known as "Ultimo Vampiro" (Spanish for "the Last Vampire")

=== Return to AAA ===
When Manson reappeared in AAA in September 2002 he did not side with the Black Family but instead sided with their longtime enemies, Los Vipers. Los Vipers had been made a part of the "Super Group" Lucha Libre Latina (AAA's version of the New World Order), a group that also included Manson's brother Electroshock; the two siblings had a falling-out over Electroshock's relationship with Lady Apache (who was his wife in real life). The feud between the brothers led to a "retirement match" at Triplemanía XII. Manson won the match but Lady Apache pleaded with him to not force Electroshock to retire but instead shave her hair off as "payment". After some consideration Manson accepted and shaved her hair off, with Electroshock voluntarily shaving his own hair off in sympathy.

==== La Secta Cibernetica ====
In 2005 Charly Manson finally rose to the top of the roster in AAA as he was one of the "illuminati" behind the creation of La Secta Cibernetica (Spanish for "the Sect of Cybernetico") led by Manson's longtime friend Cibernético. The group was joined by Chessman and the rest of the Black Family to form what would become the main rudo (heel or bad guy) stable in AAA at the time. Its storyline goal was to take over AAA and drive AAA owner Antonio Peña out of power. The storyline saw the group face a number of "AAA Loyalist" técnicos led by La Parka (the AAA version). The feud developed into a Luchas de Apuestas (literally "a fight of bets") where Cibernético put his mask on the line against La Parka's mask; the main event of Triplemanía XII saw La Parka unmask Cibernético after defeating him. When Cibernético subsequently brought in Muerta Cibernetica (Spanish for "Death Cyborg") to fight La Parka, Manson and Chessman both had their misgivings but decided to trust Cibernético's decision. Meanwhile, Manson entered into a feud with El Zorro, which concluded on June 18, 2008, at Triplemanía XIV, where Manson defeated El Zorro to win the Mexican National Heavyweight Championship in a steel cage match, where Manson's hair was also on the line. After the match Manson and La Secta placed an iron mask on El Zorro and with its supposed powers began controlling the mind of El Zorro and made him join La Secta. When Cibernético suffered a long term injury Muerta Cibernetica stepped in and took control of the group, going so far as to attack the injured Cibernético during an in-ring confrontation. When Muerta Cibernetica took over control of the group Manson decided to leave the group and rejoin Los Vipers, now known as Viper's Revolution, while also abruptly ending his storyline with El Zorro.

==== Los Hell Brothers ====
On November 18, 2006, Cibernético returned from his knee injury and founded a new stable, Los Hell Brothers, consisting of himself, Charly Manson and Chessman, as Manson and Chessman had been the only two loyal enough to leave La Secta when Muerta Cibernetica took control of it. The three instantly became the top técnico group in AAA as they waged war with La Secta del Mesias (as it had been renamed) and the newly formed La Legión Extranjera, a faction of non-Mexican talent led by Konnan. In late 2007 Charly Manson won the first ever Copa Antonio Peña, a 13-man Gauntlet style tournament held during the first ever Antonio Peña Memorial Show. Manson defeated Alan Stone, Scott Hall and Konnan to claim the cup. On May 18, 2008, Manson reinjured his femur during a match in Reynosa, Mexico. Manson was thrown into the guardrail surrounding the ring with such force that it bent the steel plate that had been inserted in 2001. The impact reinjured the femur and bruised several ribs. The injury meant that the old steel plate, which was bent more than 20 degrees off its normal shape and had to be removed so that a new plate with double the thickness could be inserted in its place. While still injured Manson made a few appearances to further the building storyline between Cibernético and Chessman where both demanded that he picked a side. When Manson refused, stating that he was friends with both, Los Hell Brothers disintegrated as Chessman attacked Cibernético.

==== Return from injury ====
AAA paid Manson the entire 10 months he was out with an injury, which was why rumors of Manson's jump to the Perros del Mal promotion caused some raised eyebrows. Los Perros del Mal even held a press conference to announce that he had signed with the company. In the end it appeared that either the rumors and the press conference were part of a major angle, or that Manson changed his mind before signing a contract as he returned to AAA in February. Manson returned to the ring on February 15, 2009, during a television taping to help El Mesias (Formerly Muerta Cibernetica) as he was being attacked by Konnan and La Legión. Three days later at another television taping Manson made his in-ring return, teaming with Latin Lover and X-Pac to defeat Konnan, Electroshock and El Zorro. On March 15, 2009, at the 2009 Rey de Reyes Manson teamed with D-Generation-Mex members X-Pac and Alex Koslov losing to the team of El Zorro, Teddy Hart and Jack Evans, after which Juventud Guerrera made his return to the promotion to help the Manson's team out. The storyline with El Zorro concluded at Triplemania XVII where Manson, X-Pac and Rocky Romero defeated El Zorro, Dark Ozz and Dark Scoria. In the summer of 2009 the storyline between Chessman and Charly Manso that had been brewing since Manson's return in the spring finally started to evolve, the two faced off in several tag team matches, leading into their first one-on-one match at the 2009 Verano de Escandalo event. The two faced off in a Streetfight that saw Charly Manson win by submission. Manson and Chessman were scheduled to face off in a Luchas de Apuesta in the main event of AAA's Heroes Inmortales III. In the week leading up to the event Manson announced that he had left AAA and would not be participating in the match. On the Mexican wrestling program Tercera Caída Manson stated that he left AAA because he was not given enough dates to earn a living and unlike the non-Mexican AAA workers he did not have a guaranteed contract. He also stated that he was not offered enough money to lose to Chessman, revealing that the original ending to Manson vs. Chessman was for Chessman to win. On September 24, 2009, AAA, through Marisela Peña and Joaquín Roldan, confirmed that Charly Manson had indeed left AAA.

=== Perros del Mal and independent circuit ===
Following Manson's departure from AAA it was announced that he would be joining Perros del Mal Producciones, a Mexican independent promotion, working against the Los Perros del Mal stable. After not defending the Mexican National Heavyweight Championship since September, 2009 Manson successfully defended the title against Máscara Año 2000, Jr. on December 5, 2009, making the Mexican National Heavyweight title active again after not being seen for three years. On February 21, 2010, at the Perros del Mal event "La Revolucion" Manson lost the Mexican National Heavyweight Title to X-Fly. Manson has also made appearances for Lucha Libre USA using the ring name Charly Malice.

=== Consejo Mundial de Lucha Libre ===
==== Los Invasores ====
On July 7, 2010, Charly Manson wrestled on the Promociones Gutiérrez 1st Anniversary Show, working for the local Consejo Mundial de Lucha Libre (CMLL) Promoter in Nuevo Laredo, Tamaulipas. On the night Manson teamed up with Juventud Guerrera and Mr. Águila reforming the "X-Team" from AAA. The team lost to Rey Bucanero and Los Hijos del Averno (Ephesto and Mephisto) on the night, but his work earned him a contract with CMLL, as part of their Los Invasores group. Manson wrestled his first match in Arena México, CMLL's main venue, on July 30, 2010 where he teamed with Héctor Garza and Mr. Águila to defeat La Peste Negra (El Felino, Negro Casas and Rey Bucanero). Manson would later defeat CMLL's top technico Místico in a singles match with the help of crooked referee El Tirantes, his biggest victory in CMLL to date. Over the Summer of 2010 Los Invasores developed a rivalry with La Peste Negra, a rivalry that led to Negro Casas making a Lucha de Apuesta, hair vs. hair, challenge to Los Invasores after a match on the August 10, 2010. The challenge was accepted by Los Invasores although no specific date, nor the actual number of participants in such a match were finalized at the time. Manson is scheduled to team with Mr. Águila and Héctor Garza against La Peste Negra at the CMLL 77th Anniversary Show on September 4, 2010. On October 15, 2010, Manson defeated Negro Casas in a Lucha de Apuesta to take his hair.

=== Second return to AAA ===
==== Los Bizarros ====
On December 5, 2010, at Guerra de Titanes Manson made a surprise return to AAA, when Cibernético announced him as the newest member of his stable, Los Bizarros. In February 2011 Manson began targeting AAA Mega Champion El Zorro, promising the return of the iron mask, he and La Secta had used to control El Zorro during the summer of 2008. On March 18 at Rey de Reyes, Manson failed in his attempt to win the World Heavyweight Championship from El Zorro. On June 18 at Triplemanía XIX, Manson represented Los Bizarros in an eight-man tag team match, where they defeated rival group El Inframundo, led by La Parka.

=== Lucha Libre Elite ===
On December 4, 2015, Pozos returned to Arena México, under the ring name Sharlie Rockstar.

=== Consejo Mundial de Lucha Libre (2018-2019) ===
On June 29, 2018, Luna returned to Consejo Mundial de Lucha Libre after an almost two-year absence, working under the name "Sharlie Rock Star". He teamed up with Cibernético, billed as "Ciber the Main Main" and The Chrizh (formerly El Zorro) as "Klan Kaoz" (later renamed "The Cl4n"). The trio made their CMLL debut in the main event of CMLL's weekly Super Viernes show, losing to Carístico, Valiente and Volador Jr. At the CMLL 85th Anniversary Show on September 14, 2018, The Cl4n defeated Los Guerreros Laguneros (Euforia, Gran Guerrero and Último Guerrero) to win the CMLL World Trios Championship.

== Legal problems and incarceration ==
On April 24, 2011, Pozos and a friend named Adrian López Reyes were arrested after getting into a fight with two police officers, which resulted in one of the officers suffering a fractured skull, the other a broken nose and whiplash and López getting shot in the foot by a third officer. Pozos was originally denied bail and was expected to be waiting for his trial in jail, facing a maximum sentence of 15 years in prison for charges of aggravated assault and attacking authority figures. On May 4, AAA announced that Pozos had been released on bail. Pozos' bail was revoked on June 30, after which he was arrested at a AAA taping and taken to the Reclusorio Sur prison in Mexico City. On August 26, 2013, Pozos was sentenced to seven years and four months in prison of which he had already served two years. Pozos was released from prison in 2015 due to good behavior.

== Championships and accomplishments ==
- Asistencia Asesoría y Administración

- Copa Antonio Peña (2007)
- Mexican National Atómicos Championship (1 time) – with May Flowers, Nygma and Picudo
- Mexican National Heavyweight Championship (1 time)
- UWA World Light Heavyweight Championship (1 time)

- Desastre Total Ultraviolento/DTU Lucha Profesional Mexicana

- DTU Consagrado Championship (1 time)

- Consejo Mundial de Lucha Libre

- CMLL World Trios Championship (1 time) – with Ciber the Main Man and The Chris

- Pro Wrestling Illustrated

- PWI ranked him #60 of the 500 best singles wrestlers in the PWI 500 in 2007

== Luchas de Apuestas record ==
Winner (wager)	Loser (wager)	Location	Event	Date	Notes
Brujería (mask)	Sagitario (mask)	N/A	Live event	N/A	
Charly Manson (hair)	El Intruso (hair)	N/A	Live event	N/A	
Charly Manson (hair)	Araña Negra (hair)	N/A	Live event	N/A	
Charly Manson and unknown (hair)	Los Sagitarios (I and II) (masks)	N/A	Live event	N/A	
Charly Manson (hair)	Electroshock and Lady Apache (hair)	Naucalpan, Mexico State	Live event	July 18, 2004	(Note: Was originally a career Vs career match but after pleading from the losing team they had their heads shaved instead.)
Charly Manson (hair)	El Zorro (hair)	Naucalpan, Mexico State	Triplemanía XIV	June 18, 2006	(Note: Steel cage match.)
Charly Manson (hair)	X-Fly (hair)	Tijuana, Baja California	Live event	May 5, 2010	
Charly Manson (hair)	Negro Casas (hair)	Mexico City	Entre el Cielo y el Infierno	October 15, 2010	
