= Antonio Peña =

Mexican professional wrestler and promoter (1951–2006)

Personal information
- Born: Antonio Hipolito Peña Herrada; June 13, 1951 Mexico City, Mexico
- Died: October 5, 2006 (aged 55) Mexico City, Mexico
- Family: Ponzoña (father); Espectro (uncle); Picudo (cousin); Silver Cat (cousin)

Professional wrestling career
- Ring name(s): Dalia Negra; Espectro de Ultratumba (II); Espectro Jr. (I); El Genio; Kahoz (I); The Rose
- Billed height: 5 ft 11 in (179 cm)
- Billed weight: 227 lb (103 kg)
- Billed from: Mexico City, Distrito Federal
- Trained by: Rojas; Isaías Rodríguez; Toño Hernández; Espectro
- Debut: April 8, 1974
- Retired: 1986

Antonio Hipolito Peña Herrada (June 13, 1951 – October 5, 2006) was a Mexican professional wrestling promoter who founded the Asistencia Asesoría y Administración (AAA) promotion in 1992. Peña's promotion reached its height of popularity in the early 1990s prior to the 1994 downturn of the Mexican economy, but continues to operate. Peña's AAA is the promotion largely responsible for bringing the lucha libre style to the United States, with AAA wrestlers such as Rey Misterio Jr., Psicosis, La Parka, Konnan and others eventually competing for American promotions.

Peña began his involvement in professional wrestling as an in-ring professional wrestler working under various masks as El Genio, Espectro Jr., Kahoz, Espectro de Ultratumba, and Dalia Negra before retiring in 1986 to work in the promotional side of wrestling. Prior to founding AAA, Peña was the head booker of Empresa Mexicana de Lucha Libre, the world's oldest professional wrestling promotion.

== Biography ==
=== Early life ===
Antonio Peña grew up in a wrestling family in Mexico City, Mexico. His father wrestled as the professional wrestler Ponzoña and his uncle was the famous original Espectro, a big star in the 1950s and 1960s. Peña was trained by Rojas, Isias Rodríguez, Toño Hernández and his uncle before making his professional wrestling debut in 1974 at the age of 18.

=== Professional wrestling career ===
Peña began his wrestling career as the masked character El Genio (Spanish for "The Genius") on April 8, 1974. After wrestling as El Genio for a couple of months Peña got his uncle's blessing to adopt the Espectro name and began wrestling as Espectro Jr. Peña wore the "venom green" mask and trunks like Espectro, but unlike the original he wrestled barefoot most of the time. As Espectro Jr., Peña blended a good solid wrestling foundation with various psychological antics to create a character, while being a hated rudo (Heel or "bad guy") character drew the crowd's attention and soon he found himself challenging the top wrestlers of the 1970s for both the Mexican National Welterweight Championship and the Mexican National Middleweight Championship, two of the top championships in Mexico at the time. While a gifted performer in the ring backstage he was described as more of a quiet, thoughtful person who would often talk about how he would change Lucha Libre and add more character and showmanship to it.

In 1980, Peña decided to change wrestling personas, giving the Espectro Jr. outfit and name to his cousin Jose Elías Pinceno, who has wrestled as Espectro Jr. since then. Instead of working as Espectro Jr., Peña came up with a totally original character of his own called Kahoz (sometimes spelled Kahos or Khaoz), a sinister masked rudo character who invoked various dark spirits as part of his pre-match ritual. Many have likened the Kahoz character to one of Lucha Libre original showmen, Murciélago Velázquez. Kahoz would often carry a bag of live pigeons to the ring with him, releasing them at his opponent and then making it seem like he ripped the head of one of the pigeons and smeared the fake blood all over himself or his opponent. To Peña the Kahoz character was not about winning championships, but about the psychology of the character and actually scaring the audience, so while he did not win any titles as Kahoz it was considered a huge success and he main evented shows all over Mexico.

While Peña had the mind for wrestling his body could not handle the heavy main event schedule that he wrestled as Kahoz and by 1985 he gave up the gimmick to work as Espectro de Ultratumba ("The Ghost from Beyond the grave"), giving the Kahoz gimmick to Astro Rey instead. Astro Rey's Kahoz was nowhere nearly as important nor as successful as Peña as Astro Rey lacked the charisma and theatrics of the original. Peña only worked as Espectro de Ultratumba for a short period of time, giving the gimmick to his cousin in 1986. Peña tried working as "Dalia Negra" but his body could not take the strain, forcing Peña to retire in 1986. Peña would briefly wrestle as "the Rose" in 1994 but only worked a handful of matches. Peña's final match at the 2001 Guerra de Titans where he wrestled, and lost to Cibernético.

=== Promotional career ===
==== Empresa Mexicana de Lucha Libre ====
Peña had been active backstage for years before his retirement, always offering suggestions of wrestling gimmicks, storylines and booking, so when he retired Peña was hired by Empresa Mexicana de Lucha Libre (EMLL), Mexico's oldest professional wrestling promotion, to work in their public relations department. Over the next couple of years Peña began booking shows for EMLL and started writing storylines for the company. Peña and head booker Juan Herrera worked together to capitalize on the 1980s television boom, making EMLL the top promotion in its time. Peña and Herrera were also the masterminds of EMLL's rebranding as Consejo Mundial de Lucha Libre (CMLL) when EMLL withdrew from the National Wrestling Alliance. Peña was the creative force behind CMLL's Mini-Estrella division and wanted to feature more non-heavyweight wrestlers in the main events. Herrera wanted to maintain the old style of booking with heavyweights such as Atlantis, El Dandy and El Satánico, while Peña wanted to feature younger, faster moving wrestlers such as Konnan, Octagón or Máscara Sagráda. In the end CMLL owner Paco Alonso decided to go with Herrera's booking style.

==== Asistencia Asesoría y Administración / AAA ====
After Paco Alonso chose to ignore Peña's booking ideas Peña began negotiations with Televisa television channel to fund a new wrestling promotion that would provide Televisa with weekly wrestling shows. In 1992 Peña started a booking agency, providing wrestlers and matches for the Televisa owned Asistencia Asesoría y Administración (AAA) promotion. While Peña technically owned the promotion Televisa owns the rights to the AAA name. In 1995 during a financial crisis Televisa sold all rights to AAA to Peña who formed Promociones Antonio Peña. S.A. (PAPSA). Peña's promotion featured many of the young wrestlers that Peña wanted CMLL to push as they chose to leave CMLL to join AAA. AAA's pinnacle came in 1993 when they drew the largest wrestling crowd in Mexico ever as they staged Triplemanía I in front of 48.000 paying fans. Over the years Peña managed to establish AAA as a viable alternative to CMLL, making CMLL and AAA "the Big Two" in Lucha Libre.

===== Trademark controversies =====
Peña was occasionally criticized with trademarking gimmicks and not allowing the original performers of the gimmicks to use the name elsewhere. Wrestlers such as Psicosis and La Parka were both forced to change their ring names when Peña took legal action to bar both of them from using those names in Mexico and gave the gimmicks to two AAA wrestlers. Psicosis now wrestles as "Nicho el Millonario" in Mexico, while the man that took over the gimmick, Psicosis II now works on the independent circuit. The original La Parka now wrestles as L.A. Park while AAA had their own La Parka for years, until an in-ring accident at an independent show in 2019 would lead to his death in the following year. Peña also tried to prevent the original Máscara Sagrada from using the name and outfit, but in the end Sagráda won the court case and the rights to the name. Peña often "recycled" the ring personas, giving the mask and outfit to a new wrestler if the previous one left AAA, for instance when Super Crazy left AAA Peña gave the Histeria outfit to another wrestler.

=== Death and legacy ===
Peña died on October 5, 2006, due to a massive heart attack. In the days following Peña's death several wrestling promotions in Japan that AAA had worked with over the years paid tribute to the promoter. Peña's death left a void in AAA, he had always been the man in charge and always had the final word. In the years up to his death, Peña had brought in his brother-in-law Joaquin Roldan and Roldan's son Dorian Roldan and taught them the business of running a wrestling promotion with the later becoming the CEO. His sister and Dorian's mother Marisela Peña also has helped shape what AAA is today since its inception and now is the president.

AAA holds a tribute show to Antonio Peña each year around the anniversary of his death. From 2009 onwards the annual event has been known as Héroes Inmortales ("Immortal Heroes"). As part of Héroes Inmortales, AAA holds the Copa Antonio Peña, a tournament in honor of Peña.

In April 2025, AAA was acquired by American professional wrestling promotion WWE with the backing of Mexican entertainment company Fillip, marking the first time in 33 years that AAA wouldn't be owned by members of the Peña–Roldán family and Televisa.

== Championships and accomplishments ==
- AAA
  - AAA Hall of Fame (Class of 2007)
- Mexican independent circuit
  - Texcoco Middleweight Championship (1 time)
- Wrestling Observer Newsletter
  - Wrestling Observer Newsletter Hall of Fame (Class of 1996)
