= Guerra de Titanes (2004) =

2004 Lucha Libre AAA World Wide event

Guerra de Titanes 2004
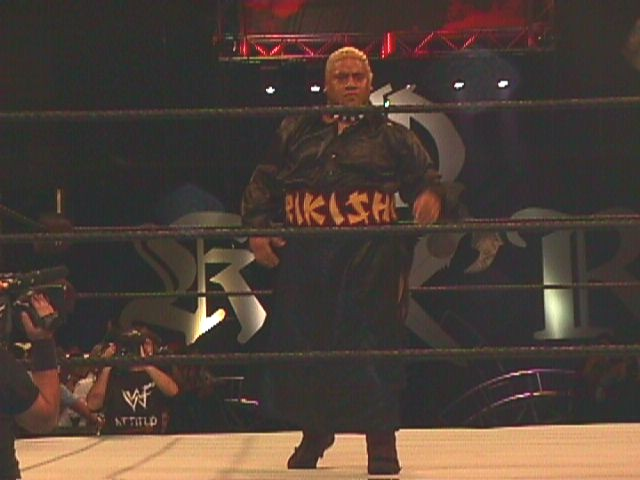
- Rikishi, part of La Legión Extranjera for one night
- Promotion: AAA
- Date: December 5, 2004
- City: Naucalpan, Mexico
- Venue: El Toreo
- Attendance: 18,500

Pay-per-view chronology
← Previous; Verano de Escándalo	Next → Rey de Reyes

Guerra de Titanes chronology
← Previous; 2003	Next → 2005

Guerra de Titanes (2004) ("War of the Titans") was the eight Guerra de Titanesprofessional wrestling show promoted by AAA. The show took place on December 5, 2004 in Naucalpan, Mexico like the previous year’s event. The main event featured a Tag Team match between AAA loyalists Cibernético and La Parka taking on the "Invading forces" of La Legión Extranjera (Konnan and Rikishi).

== Production ==
=== Background ===
Starting in 1997 the Mexican professional wrestling, company AAA has held a major wrestling show late in the year, either November or December, called Guerra de Titanes ("War of the Titans"). The show often features championship matches or Lucha de Apuestas or bet matches where the competitors risked their wrestling mask or hair on the outcome of the match. In Lucha Libre the Lucha de Apuetas match is considered more prestigious than a championship match and a lot of the major shows feature one or more Apuesta matches. The Guerra de Titanes show is hosted by a new location each year, emanating from cities such as Madero, Chihuahua, Chihuahua, Mexico City, Guadalajara, Jalisco and more. The 2004 Guerra de Titanes show was the eighth show in the series.

=== Storylines ===
The Guerra de Titanes show featured six professional wrestling matches with different wrestlers involved in pre-existing, scripted feuds, plots, and storylines. Wrestlers were portrayed as either heels (referred to as rudos in Mexico, those that portray the "bad guys") or faces (técnicos in Mexico, the "good guy" characters) as they followed a series of tension-building events, which culminated in a wrestling match or series of matches.

== Results ==
No.	Results	Stipulations
1	Los Barrio Boys (Alan, Billy Boy and Decnnis) defeated the Black Family (Cuervo, Escoria, and Ozz), Los Kumbia Kids, and Los Espantapajaros (I, II, and III)	Four corners match
2	Abismo Negro, Tiffany, Sexy Piscis, and Mini Abismo Negro defeated Máscara Sagráda, Lady Apache, Pimpinela Escarlata, and Mascarita Sagrada	Eight-man "Atómicos" tag team match
3	Electroshock, Gronda, El Intocable, and El Zorro defeated Mr. Águila, Charly Manson, Chessman, and Juventud Guerrera	Eight-man "Atómicos" tag team match
4	Poncho de Nigris defeated May Flowers and Polvo de Estrellas	Lucha de Apuestas "handicap hair vs. hair" match
5	Pirata Morgan lost to La Fiera, Hator, Heavy Metal and Latin Lover	Steel cage Lucha de Apuestas "loser loses his hair" match
6	Cibernético and La Parka defeated La Legión Extranjera (Konnan and Rikishi) by disqualification	Tag team match
