= Guerra de Titanes (2007) =

2007 Lucha Libre AAA World Wide event

Guerra de Titanes 2007
- Official poster for the show depicting (left to right) Octagón, La Parka, El Zorro, Cibernético, Electroshock and El Intocable
- Promotion: Asistencia Asesoría y Administración
- Date: November 20, 2007
- City: Madero, Mexico
- Venue: Convention Center
- Attendance: 17,000

Pay-per-view chronology
← Previous; Antonio Peña Memorial Show	Next → Rey de Reyes

Guerra de Titanes chronology
← Previous; 2006	Next → 2008

2007 Guerra de Titanes ("War of the Titans") was the eleventh Guerra de Titanes professional wrestling show promoted by Asistencia Asesoría y Administración (AAA). The show took place on November 20, 2007, in Madero, Mexico like the previous year's event. The Main event featured a 3 way Elimination match where the AAA Mega Champion El Mesias defended against Cibernético and El Zorro.

== Production ==
=== Background ===
Starting in 1997 the Mexican professional wrestling, company Asistencia Asesoría y Administración (AAA, or Triple A; Spanish for "Assistance, Consulting, and Administration") has held a major wrestling show late in the year, either November or December, called Guerra de Titanes ("War of the Titans"). The show often features championship matches or Lucha de Apuestas or bet matches where the competitors risked their wrestling mask or hair on the outcome of the match. In Lucha Libre the Lucha de Apuetas match is considered more prestigious than a championship match and a lot of the major shows feature one or more Apuesta matches. The Guerra de Titanes show is hosted by a new location each year, emanating from cities such as Madero, Chihuahua, Chihuahua, Mexico City, Guadalajara, Jalisco and more. The 2007 Guerra de Titanes show was the eleventh show in the series.

=== Storylines ===
The Guerra de Titanes show featured six professional wrestling matches with different wrestlers involved in pre-existing, scripted feuds, plots, and storylines. Wrestlers were portrayed as either heels (referred to as rudos in Mexico, those that portray the "bad guys") or faces (técnicos in Mexico, the "good guy" characters) as they followed a series of tension-building events, which culminated in a wrestling match or series of matches.

== Results ==
No.	Results	Stipulations	Times
1	Real Fuerza Aerea (Aero Star, Rey Cometa, and Super Fly) defeated the Black Family (Dark Cuervo, Dark Escoria, and Dark Ozz)	Six-man "Lucha Libre rules" tag team match	09:49
2	Gran Apache and Mari Apache defeated Billy Boy and Faby Apache, Espiritu and La Diabólica, and Mr. Niebla and Ayako Hamada	Elimination match for the vacant AAA World Mixed Tag Team Championship	23:45
3	The Mexican Powers (Crazy Boy and Joe Líder) (c) defeated Los Hell Brothers (Charly Manson and Chessman), La Familia de Tijuana (Extreme Tiger and Halloween), and La Legión Extranjera (Teddy Hart and Sabu)	Extreme four-way match for the AAA World Tag Team Championship	20:47
4	Octagón and La Parka (c) defeated Electroshock and Kenzo Suzuki by disqualification	Double Dog collar chain match for the Mexican National Tag Team Championship	09:36
5	Alan Stone, El Intocable and Super Caló defeated Los Guapos (Decnnis, Scorpio Jr. and Zumbido)	Steel cage match Lucha de Apuestas "loser has his head shaved" match. Order of escape: Zumbido, Super Calo, Intocable, Decnis and Alan Stone. Scorpio Jr. was the last man remaining and had his head shaved.	18:45
6	El Mesias defeated Cibernético and El Zorro	Three-way elimination match for the AAA Mega Championship	13:32
(c) / – the champion(s) heading into the match
