= Guerra de Titanes (2005) =

2005 Lucha Libre AAA World Wide event

Guerra de Titanes 2005
- Official poster for the event depicting titans of myth
- Promotion: AAA
- Date: December 10, 2005
- City: Guadalajara, Jalisco, Mexico
- Venue: Plaza de Toros Nuevo Progreso
- Attendance: 14,000

Pay-per-view chronology
← Previous; Verano de Escándalo	Next → Rey de Reyes

Guerra de Titanes chronology
← Previous; 2004	Next → 2006

Guerra de Titanes (2005) ("War of the Titans") was the ninth Guerra de Titanes professional wrestling show promoted by AAA. The show took place on December 10, 2005 in Guadalajara, Jalisco, Mexico. The Main event featured Eight-man "Atómics" tag team match between the teams of La Secta Cibernetica (Cibernético, Dark Cuervo and Dark Escoria) and Abismo Negro, Latin Lover and La Parka.

== Production ==
=== Background ===
Starting in 1997 the Mexican professional wrestling, company AAA has held a major wrestling show late in the year, either November or December, called Guerra de Titanes ("War of the Titans"). The show often features championship matches or Lucha de Apuestas or bet matches where the competitors risked their wrestling mask or hair on the outcome of the match. In Lucha Libre the Lucha de Apuetas match is considered more prestigious than a championship match and a lot of the major shows feature one or more Apuesta matches. The Guerra de Titanes show is hosted by a new location each year, emanating from cities such as Madero, Chihuahua, Chihuahua, Mexico City, Guadalajara, Jalisco and more. The 2005 Guerra de Titanes show was the ninth show in the series.

=== Storylines ===
The Guerra de Titanes show featured nine professional wrestling matches with different wrestlers involved in pre-existing, scripted feuds, plots, and storylines. Wrestlers were portrayed as either heels (referred to as rudos in Mexico, those that portray the "bad guys") or faces (técnicos in Mexico, the "good guy" characters) as they followed a series of tension-building events, which culminated in a wrestling match or series of matches.

== Results ==
No.	Results	Stipulations
1	Kaoma Jr., Oscuridad, Rio Bravo, and Tito Santana defeated Hombre sin Miedo, Laredo Kid, Principe Zafiro, and Rey Cometa	Eight-man "Atómicos" tag team match
2	Jerrito Estrada, Mini Abismo Negro, and Mini Psicosis defeated Mascarita Sagrada, Mascarita Sagrada Jr., and Octagoncito	Six-man "Lucha Libre rules" tag team match
3	Shika defeated Chaman	Lucha de Apuestas second's hair vs. second's hair match
4	El Oriental and Cinthia Moreno defeated Gran Apache and Tiffany	1st Round match in the AAA World Mixed Tag Team Championship Tournament
5	Chessman and La Diabólica defeated Billy Boy and Estrellita	1st Round match in the AAA World Mixed Tag Team Championship Tournament
6	El Oriental and Cinthia Moreno defeated Chessman and La Diabólica	Tournament final for the vacant AAA World Mixed Tag Team Championship
7	Electroshock, El Intocable, and Zorro defeated Charly Manson, Pirata Morgan, and Zumbido	Six-man "Lucha Libre rules" tag team match
8	Shocker defeated Sangre Chicana	Lucha de Apuestas "hair vs. hair" match
9	Abismo Negro, Latin Lover and La Parka, defeated La Secta Cibernetica (Cibernético, Dark Cuervo, and Dark Escoria)	Six-man "Lucha Libre rules" tag team match

=== AAA World Mixed Tag Team Championship Tournament ===
1st Round; Sin Limite: Guerra de Titanes; December 10, 2005 (Aired: December 25)
Cinthia Moreno and El Oriental	Win
Tiffany and Gran Apache	—
Estrellita and Billy Boy	—
La Diabólica and Chessman	Win

Final; Sin Limite: Guerra de Titanes; December 10, 2005 (Aired: December 25)
Cinthia Moreno and El Oriental	Win
La Diabólica and Chessman	—
