= Guerra de Titanes (2006) =

2006 Lucha Libre AAA World Wide event

Guerra de Titanes 2006
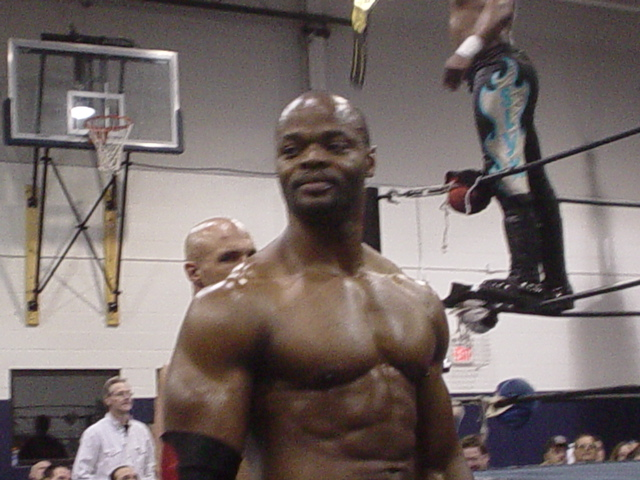
- Elix Skipper, part of La Legión Extranjera for one night
- Promotion: AAA
- Date: December 8, 2006
- City: Madero, Mexico
- Venue: Convention Center
- Attendance: 12,000

Pay-per-view chronology
← Previous; Verano de Escándalo	Next → Rey de Reyes

Guerra de Titanes chronology
← Previous; 2005	Next → 2007

Guerra de Titanes ("War of the Titans") was the tenth Guerra de Titanes professional wrestling show promoted by AAA. The show took place on December 8, 2006, in Madero, Mexico. The Main event featured "extreme coffin" match between Cibernético and El Mesias, with Konnan serving as special referee in the match.

== Production ==
=== Background ===
Starting in 1997 the Mexican professional wrestling, company AAA has held a major wrestling show late in the year, either November or December, called Guerra de Titanes ("War of the Titans"). The show often features championship matches or Lucha de Apuestas or bet matches where the competitors risked their wrestling mask or hair on the outcome of the match. In Lucha Libre the Lucha de Apuetas match is considered more prestigious than a championship match and a lot of the major shows feature one or more Apuesta matches. The Guerra de Titanes show is hosted by a new location each year, emanating from cities such as Madero, Chihuahua, Chihuahua, Mexico City, Guadalajara, Jalisco and more. The 2006 Guerra de Titanes show was the tenth show in the series.

=== Storylines ===
The Guerra de Titanes show featured six professional wrestling matches with different wrestlers involved in pre-existing, scripted feuds, plots, and storylines. Wrestlers were portrayed as either heels (referred to as rudos in Mexico, those that portray the "bad guys") or faces (técnicos in Mexico, the "good guy" characters) as they followed a series of tension-building events, which culminated in a wrestling match or series of matches.

== Results ==
No.	Results	Stipulations
1	Billy Boy, Faby Apache, Mascarita Sagrada and Pimpinela Escarlata defeated Gran Apache, Rosy Moreno, Mini Abismo Negro and Polvo de Estrellas	Eight-man "Atómicos" tag team match
2	Abismo Negro, Antifaz del Norte, Charly Manson and Histeria defeated El Brazo Jr., El Ángel, El Elegido and Laredo Kid	Eight-man "Atómicos" tag team match
3	the Black Family (Dark Cuervo, Dark Escoria and Dark Ozz) defeated the Mexican Powers (Crazy Boy, Joe Líder and Psicosis II)	Six-man "Lucha Libre rules" tag team match
4	Alan Stone, El Intocable and Scorpio Jr. defeated Brazo de Plata	Luchas de Apuestas "hair vs. hair" Dog collar chain match
5	El Alebrije, Octagón and La Parka defeated La Legión Extranjera (Elix Skipper, Head Hunter A and Hotstuff Hernandez) by disqualification	Six-man "Lucha Libre rules" tag team match
6	Cibernético defeated Muerte Cibernetica	"extreme coffin" match with Konnan as the special guest referee
