= Guerra de Titanes =

Lucha Libre AAA World Wide event series

- AAA Guerra de Titanes 2025 logo
- Promotions: Lucha Libre AAA Worldwide
- First event: Guerra de Titanes (1997)

Guerra de Titanes (Spanish for "War of the Titans") is a major annual professional wrestling event in Mexico promoted by the Lucha Libre AAA World Wide (AAA) promotion. The show is the "End of year" show and is traditionally held in December with a few exceptions. The first show was held in 1997 and since then twenty three events have been held, the more recent ones presented on pay-per-view while the early shows were shown as television specials on the Televisa channel.

== History ==
The first Guerra de Titanes was held on December 13, 1997, and was shown on pay-per-view (PPV). It was later shown as a television special. Since 1997 Guerra de Titanes has been the "end of the year" show for AAA. All Guerra de Titanes shows have been held in Mexico, with most events (six) being held in Madero, Tamaulipas. The 2004 Guerra de Titanes event holds the record for the largest crowd, with 18,500 spectators. As is tradition with AAA major events the wrestlers compete inside a hexagonal wrestling ring and not the four-sided ring the promotion uses for television events and house shows.

As of 2014 Guerra de Titanes has seen twelve Lucha de Apuestas matches, with eleven people having their hair shaved as a result of losing (El Picudo, Heavy Metal, May Flowers, Polvo de Estrellas, Sangre Chicana, Brazo de Plata, Scorpio Jr., El Brazo, Faby Apache, Vampiro and Pimpinela Escarlata) and two wrestlers being unmasked (Jaque Mate and Super Fly). Guerra de Titanes has seen ten successful title defenses and nineteen title changes over the years. In 2003 the event hosted the "Televisa tag team tournament", the only year it was ever held. In 2015, Guerra de Titanes was scheduled to take place on December 4, but was canceled by AAA a week earlier with no explanation given. It was later announced that it would take place on January 22, 2016.

== Dates, venues, and main events ==
No.	Name	Date	City	Venue	Main event	Ref.
1	Guerra de Titanes (1997)	December 13, 1997	Madero	Convention Center	Heavy Metal and Perro Aguayo vs. Picudo and Sangre Chicana – Steel Cage Match	
2	Guerra de Titanes (1998)	December 13, 1998	Chihuahua, Chihuahua	Aguirre Gym	Octagón and Heavy Metal vs. Pentagón and Kick Boxer – Steel Cage Match	
3	Guerra de Titanes (1999)	December 10, 1999	Madero	Convention Center	Octagón vs. Jaque Mate – Luchas de Apuestas "mask vs. mask" match	
4	Guerra de Titanes (2000)	December 8, 2000	Madero	Convention Center	Héctor Garza and Latin Lover vs. Heavy Metal and Perro Aguayo Jr. – "Extreme" Steel Cage Match	
5	Guerra de Titanes (2001)	November 23, 2001	Mexico City	Plaza de Toros	Heavy Metal vs. Perro Aguayo Jr. vs. Héctor Garza vs. Latin Lover – Luchas de Apuestas "loser loses his hair elimination" match	
6	Guerra de Titanes (2002)	November 15, 2002	Veracruz, Veracruz	El Toreo	El Alebrije, Máscara Sagráda, La Parka and Octagón vs. Abismo Negro, Cibernético, the Monsther and Leatherface	
7	Guerra de Titanes (2003)	November 30, 2003	Naucalpan	El Toreo	Latin Lover and Michael Shane vs. David Young and Mr. Águila in the Televisa Tag Team Tournament final	
8	Guerra de Titanes (2004)	December 5, 2004	Naucalpan	El Toreo	Cibernético and La Parka vs. La Legión Extranjera (Konnan and Rikishi)	
9	Guerra de Titanes (2005)	December 10, 2005	Guadalajara, Jalisco	Plaza de Toros Nuevo Progreso	Abismo Negro, Latin Lover and La Parka vs. La Secta Cibernetica (Cibernético, Dark Cuervo and Dark Escoria)	
10	Guerra de Titanes (2006)	December 8, 2006	Madero	Convention Center	Cibernético vs. Muerte Cibernetica with Konnan as special guest referee – "extreme coffin" match.	
11	Guerra de Titanes (2007)	November 20, 2007	Madero	Convention Center	El Mesias vs. Cibernético vs. El Zorro for the AAA Mega Championship	
12	Guerra de Titanes (2008)	December 6, 2008	Orizaba	Plaza de Toros La Concordia	Pirata Morgan vs. Electroshock vs. Super Fly vs. Brazo de Plata vs. El Brazo vs. El Elegido – Steel Cage Match Luchas de Apuestas	
13	Guerra de Titanes (2009)	December 11, 2009	Ciudad Madero, Tamaulipas	El Centro de Convenciones	Dr. Wagner Jr. vs. El Mesias – Domo De La Muerte cage match for the AAA Mega Championship	
14	Guerra de Titanes (2010)	December 5, 2010	Zapopan, Jalisco	Auditorio Benito Juárez	Los Perros del Mal (Damián 666, Halloween and X-Fly) vs. Los Psycho Circus (Psycho Clown, Monster Clown and Murder Clown) – Steel cage weapons match	
15	Guerra de Titanes (2011)	December 16, 2011	Puebla, Puebla	Estadio Hermanos Serdán	Dr. Wagner Jr. vs. L.A. Park for the AAA Latin American Championship	
16	Guerra de Titanes (2012)	December 2, 2012	Zapopan, Jalisco	Auditorio Benito Juárez	Chessman vs. Cibernético vs. Dr. Wagner Jr. vs. L.A. Park vs. El Hijo del Perro Aguayo vs. Vampiro – Steel cage Lucha de Apuestas "hairs vs. masks" match	
17	Guerra de Titanes (2013)	December 8, 2013	Tepic, Nayarit	Auditorio de la Gente	Daga, Jeff Jarrett, La Parka Negra and Psicosis vs. Cibernético, El Hijo del Perro Aguayo, El Mesías and La Parka	
18	Guerra de Titanes (2014)	December 7, 2014	Zapopan, Jalisco	Auditorio Benito Juarez	El Texano Jr. vs. El Patrón Alberto for the AAA Mega Championship	
19	Guerra de Titanes (2016)	January 22, 2016	Mexico City	Gimnasio Juan de la Barrera	El Mesías and El Texano Jr. vs. Dr. Wagner Jr. and Psycho Clown	
20	Guerra de Titanes (2017)	January 20, 2017	Mexico City	Gimnasio Juan de la Barrera	Johnny Mundo (c) vs. Pentagón Jr. for the AAA Latin American Championship	
21	Guerra de Titanes (January 2018)	January 26, 2018	Mexico City	Gimnasio Juan de la Barrera	El Hijo del Fantasma (c) vs. El Texano Jr. for the AAA Latin American Championship	
22	Guerra de Titanes (December 2018)	December 2, 2018	Aguascalientes, Aguascalientes	Palenque de la Feria	Psycho Clown and Rey Wagner vs. Blue Demon Jr. and Killer Kross	
23	Guerra de Titanes (2019)	December 14, 2019	Ciudad Madero, Tamaulipas	Domo Madero	Psycho Clown, Dr. Wagner Jr., and Drago vs. Blue Demon Jr., Rey Escorpión, and Rush El Toro Blanco	
24	Guerra de Titanes (2023)	November 19, 2023	Ciudad Juárez, Chihuahua	Gimnasio Jsue Neri Santos	El Hijo del Vikingo (c) vs. Dralístico for the AAA Mega Championship	
25	Guerra de Titanes (2024)	November 10, 2024	Ciudad Juárez, Chihuahua	Gimnasio Jsue Neri Santos	Alberto El Patrón (c) vs. Pagano for the AAA Mega Championship	
26	Guerra de Titanes (2025)	December 20, 2025	Guadalajara, Jalisco	Arena Guadalajara	Los Gringos Locos 2.0 (Dominik Mysterio and El Grande Americano) vs. Rey Fénix and Rey Mysterio	
27	Guerra de Titanes (2026)	December 19, 2026	Guadalajara, Jalisco	Arena Guadalajara		
