= Guerra de Titanes (2013) =

2013 Lucha Libre AAA World Wide event

- Promotional poster for the event, featuring Faby Apache, La Parka, Blue Demon Jr., Psycho Clown, El Mesías, El Texano Jr., Cibernético, El Hijo del Perro Aguayo, Electroshock, Jeff Jarrett and Taya
- Promotion: AAA
- Date: December 8, 2013
- City: Tepic, Nayarit
- Venue: Auditorio de la Gente

Event chronology
| ← Previous; Héroes Inmortales VII | Next → Rey de Reyes |

Guerra de Titanes chronology
| ← Previous; 2012 | Next → 2014 |

Guerra de Titanes (Spanish for "War of the Titans") was a professional wrestling event produced by the AAA promotion, which took place on December 8, 2013, at Auditorio de la Gente in Tepic, Nayarit. The event was the seventeenth Guerra de Titanes end of the year show promoted by AAA since 1997. The state government of Nayarit bought all tickets to the event and allowed people to attend it for free on a "first-come, first-served" basis.

== Production ==
=== Background ===
Starting in 1997 the Mexican professional wrestling, company AAA has held a major wrestling show late in the year, either November or December, called Guerra de Titanes ("War of the Titans"). The show often features championship matches or Lucha de Apuestas or bet matches where the competitors risked their wrestling mask or hair on the outcome of the match. In Lucha Libre the Lucha de Apuetas match is considered more prestigious than a championship match and a lot of the major shows feature one or more Apuesta matches. The Guerra de Titanes show is hosted by a new location each year, emanating from cities such as Madero, Chihuahua, Chihuahua, Mexico City, Guadalajara, Jalisco and more. The 2013 Guerra de Titanes show was the sixteenth show in the series.

=== Storylines ===
The Guerra de Titanes show featured six professional wrestling matches with different wrestlers involved in pre-existing, scripted feuds, plots, and storylines. Wrestlers were portrayed as either heels (referred to as rudos in Mexico, those that portray the "bad guys") or faces (técnicos in Mexico, the "good guy" characters) as they followed a series of tension-building events, which culminated in a wrestling match or series of matches.

== Results ==
| No. | Results | Stipulations |
|---|---|---|
| 1 | Dinastía, Ludxor and Venum defeated El Apache, Machine Rocker and Mini Abismo Negro | Six-man tag team match |
| 2 | Angélico, Fénix and Jack Evans defeated Juventud Guerrera, Pentagón Jr. and Steve Pain | Six-man tag team match |
| 3 | Mamba defeated Pimpinela Escarlata; Other participants: Faby Apache, Jennifer Blake, Pasión Kristal, Polvo de Estrellas, Sexy Star and Taya | Eight-way steel cage Lucha de Apuestas, Hair vs. Hair match |
| 4 | Blue Demon Jr. (c) (with Aero Star) defeated Electroshock (with Fénix) | Singles match for the AAA Latin American Championship |
| 5 | Los Psycho Circus (Monster Clown, Murder Clown and Psycho Clown) (c) (with Mini Clown) defeated El Consejo (El Hijo del Fantasma, Silver King and El Texano Jr.) | Six-man tag team match for the AAA World Trios Championship |
| 6 | Cibernético, El Hijo del Perro Aguayo, El Mesías and La Parka defeated Daga, Jeff Jarrett (with Karen Jarrett), La Parka Negra and Psicosis | Eight-man tag team match |
(c) / – the champion(s) heading into the match
