= Pentagón =

Mexican professional wrestling character

Pentagón is a lucha libre, or professional wrestling, persona also referred to as a gimmick that has been portrayed by a number of different people over the years. The gimmick was created as an Evil twin of professional wrestler Octagón and is always a rudo, or heel character (a character portraying the "bad guy" in wrestling). The gimmick was created by AAA owner Antonio Peña in 1995, giving AAA the rights to the name "Pentagón", which meant that when wrestlers who played Pentagón left AAA they had to modify the name such as "Pentagón Black". There have been at least three distinctive versions of Pentagón.

Following the introduction of the Pentagón persona Peña also introduced Pentagoncito, a Mini-Estrellas of Pentagón to act as the protagonist against the Mini-Estrella Octagoncito. There has been at least two different people under the Pentagoncito character. In 2012 AAA introduced Octagón, Jr., which led to the introduction of Pentagón Jr. a few months later.

== Pentagón I (1995–1996) ==
Trying to build on the popularity of AAA wrestler Octagón, AAA owner Antonio Peña decided to use the "Evil twin" concept and turned Jesus Andrade, previously known as Espanto Jr. into "Pentagón", a rival and distorted mirror image of Octagón. Initially the two faced off in six man or eight man tag team matches as a way to build tension for singles matches further along the storyline. Their first encounter came at Triplemanía III-A the first of AAA's major shows of 1995 when Octagón teamed with Konnan, Perro Aguayo and La Parka to defeat the team of Pentagón, Cien Caras, Máscara Año 2000 and Jerry Estrada although without Pentagón and Octagón being involved in the finish of the match. One week late at Triplemanía III-A Octagón teamed up with El Hijo del Santo, Rey Misterio, Jr. and La Parka to defeat Pentagón, Blue Panther, Psicosis and Fuerza Guerrera. Again Octagón and Pentagón were not involved in the finish of the match but faced off several times in the ring to further the storyline.

In early 1996, Andrade suffered an injury, during a match with La Parka where he was clinically dead for a moment in the middle of the ring but brought back to life. The injury, coupled with his age, forced Andrade to retire from wrestling.

== Pentagón II/Pentagón Black (1996–2000) ==
Since the character of Pentagón wore a full-face mask and his wrestling outfit only exposed the fingers, Antonio Peña decided to have another wrestler work under the gimmick following Jesús Andrade's 1996 retirement, a practice that Peña continued several times since.

The second wrestler to portray Pentagón was José Mercado López, formerly known as Metálico and Dr. Cérebro (no relation to the current Metálico or Dr. Cerebro). His first major clash with Octagón was in AAA's 1997 Rey de Reyes tournament, in which Octagón outlasted Pentagón, Fuerza Guerrera and El Pantera into the finals. The following month, Pentagón debuted in the United States in his only official match for the World Wrestling Federation, teaming with Heavy Metal and Pierroth to defeat Octagón, Latin Lover and Hector Garza. The arrangement between AAA and the WWF meant that the WWF would send wrestlers to Mexico on occasion, one such occasion saw Pentagón team up with Diesel and "Razor" Ramon, who were also the second version of those characters like Pentagón. The trio defeated Cibernetico, El Canek and Octagón. Pentagón II was the only wrestler to win a championship under that name, defeating arch rival Octagón on March 28, 1997, to win the Mexican National Middleweight Championship as another step in the storyline between the two rival characters. He would remain the champion for over a year, including successful title defenses against Octagón. In late 1997 Pentagón began teaming with Abismo Negro on a regular basis as they began a storyline against Antonio and Jorge Brennan, that lead to a Steel Cage match between the two teams at the 1998 Rey de Reyes show. Pentagón and Abismo Negro lost the match, which led to Abismo Negro turning on Pentagón after the match. This marked the first time the Pentagón character worked as a Face (called a tecnico in Lucha Libre, the "good guy") and actually meant that he would team up with now former nemesis Octagón. The duo unsuccessfully challenged Fuerza Guerrera and Mosco de la Merced for the Mexican National Tag Team Championship on two occasions. The storyline with Abismo Negro saw Negro defeat Pentagón on May 19, 1998, to win the Mexican National Middleweight Championship from him. The storyline with Abismo Negro saw Pentagón, Octagón and Octagoncito team up to defeat Los Vipers (Abismo), Electroshock and Mini Abismo Negro on AAA's Triplemanía VI on June 7, 1998 In late 1998 the Pentagón character turned back to being a heel (rudo in Lucha Libre) character and resumed his feud with Octagón. At the 1998 Guerra de Titanes show Octagón and Heavy Metal defeated Pentagón and Kick Boxer inside a Steel Cage. By mid-1999 Pentagón started to have his real life wife Xochitl Hamada accompany him to the ring, which led to a match between Pentagón and El Oriental where they both put the hair of their valet on the line in the match. Pentagón won and El Oriental's corner woman Esther Moreno had to have all her hair shaved off as a result. On July 5, 2000, Pentagón and Hamada, faced El Oriental and Moreno on the undercard of Triplemanía VIII, held in Tokyo, Japan. The match ended with both teams being counted out of the ring, resulting in a draw between the two teams. Following the Triplemanía VIII match Mercado left AAA and began working primarily in Japan, he adopted the ring name Pentagón Black, changing the character and mask just enough to distance himself from AAA, but still use the reputation of Pentagón. He would later work under other ring names as well, but none as notable as Pentagón/Pentagón Black.

== Pentagón III (2001–2004) ==
When Mercado left AAA Antonio Peña put a third man under the mask, feeling like there was still an unresolved storyline between Octagón and Pentagón. He gave the mask and name to Ricardo Moreno Antonio, a fifteen-year veteran who had previously worked as "Dragon Chino I" ("Chinese Dragon") and Hong Kong Lee to create Pentagón III. Moreno, as Pentagón, worked his first major AAA show on September 16, 2001, when he teamed up with Máscara Maligna (An "evil twin" of Máscara Sagrada) and Monsther only to lose to the trio of El Alebrije, Super Crazy and Randy on the undercard of AAA's annual Verano de Escandalo show. The "Evil" twin concept was used both for Octagón to create Pentagón and for Máscara Sagrada ("Sacred Mask") to create Máscara Maligna ("Evil Mask"), and the two storylines began to intertwine leading up to AAA's Triplemanía X show on July 5, 2002. On the night Pentagón and Octagón were forced to team up to face the team of Máscara Sagrada and Máscara Maligna in a Relevos Suicida match, which meant that the losing team would have to wrestle each other under Luchas de Apuestas, or "Bet match" rules with the loser of that match being forced to unmask. The Luchas de Apuestas match is often used to end a long running storyline between two wrestlers and when Octagón overcame Pentagón once and for all, forcing him to unmask after the match the storyline finally came to an end. AAA got one final match out of the Octagón / Pentagón storyline as Pentagón lost yet another Lucha de Apuesta to his "good twin" and as a result was shaved bald. Ricardo Moreno would on occasion work under the ring name Pentagón on the Independent circuit, but AAA never used the Pentagón character again.

== Pentagón Viper ==
The Pentagón Viper character was used briefly in the Japanese wrestling promotion Zero-1 by either Pentagón Black or by Kazuhiko Masada who worked one tour with them under that name. The character was a generic "masked bad guy" who wore a mask and outfit similar to the Pentagón/Pentagón Black character with minor modifications.

== Pentagoncito I ==
Pena had introduced the Mini-Estrella character Octagoncito to AAA, creating a smaller version of the original Octagón. The introduction of Octagoncito was followed by the introduction of Pentagoncito, another Mini-Estrella created to play the antagonist to Octagoncito. The first person to play Pentagoncito was Juan Andrade Salas, a younger brother of the original Pentagón, who had previously played the role of "Zafiro" (Sapphire) in the Las Gemas del Ring ("The Gems of the Ring") trio some years prior. Pentagoncito remained with AAA for a number of years, even after the original Octagoncito was replaced with a new wrestler working as Octagoncito.

== Pentagoncito II ==
Another wrestler Pentagoncito on the Mexican independent circuit, primarily to work with the original Octagoncito that kept using the name even after leaving AAA. This version of Pentagoncito is also related to the original Pentagón, although the specific family connection has not been revealed. Is associated with El Hijo del Santo's Todo X el Todo promotion.

== Pentagoncito Black ==
Just like the second version of Pentagón began working as Pentagón Black, a Mini-Estrella began working as Pentagoncito Black on the Mexican Independent Circuit. Due to the secretive nature of masked wrestlers in Mexico his real name is unrevealed, allowing for the possibility that the person playing Pentagoncito Black is also working under other ring names since the Pentagoncito Black character has only been used in limited qualities.

== Lady Pentagón ==
At one point La Amapola played the role of "Lady Pentagón" in AAA, related with a rumored introduction of Lady Octagón but the character was extremely short lived and only seen in videos and vignettes, never actually competing in the ring under that name while in AAA. Amapola revived the character during her time in Arsion.

== Pentagón Jr. ==
In the fall of 2012 AAA introduced the next generation Octagón when Samuray del Sol was given the name Octagón Jr. and a modified version of the original's mask. At the 2012 Guerra de Titanes AAA introduced the repackaged Dark Dragon as "Pentagón Jr.", the natural antagonist to Octagón Jr.

== Championships and accomplishments ==
Only championships won under the "Pentagón/Pentagoncito" character are listed.

- AAA

- Mexican National Middleweight Championship – Pentagón II

== Luchas de Apuestas record ==
Only Luchas de Apuestas under the "Pentagón/Pentagoncito" character are listed.

Winner (wager)	Loser (wager)	Location	Event	Date	Notes
Pentagón II (hair)	El Oriental (hair)	Naucalpan, State of Mexico	2000 Rey de Reyes	March 5, 2000	(Note: Both wrestlers put the hair of their corner person on the line, Oriental's corner man was shaved bald after the match.)
Octagón (mask)	Pentagón III (mask)	Ciudad Madero, Tamaulipas	Triplemanía X	July 5, 2002	
Octagón (mask)	Pentagón III (hair)	Monterrey, Nuevo León	AAA Live event	September 26, 2004	
