= Guerra de Titanes (1997) =

1997 Lucha Libre AAA World Wide event

Guerra de Titanes 1997
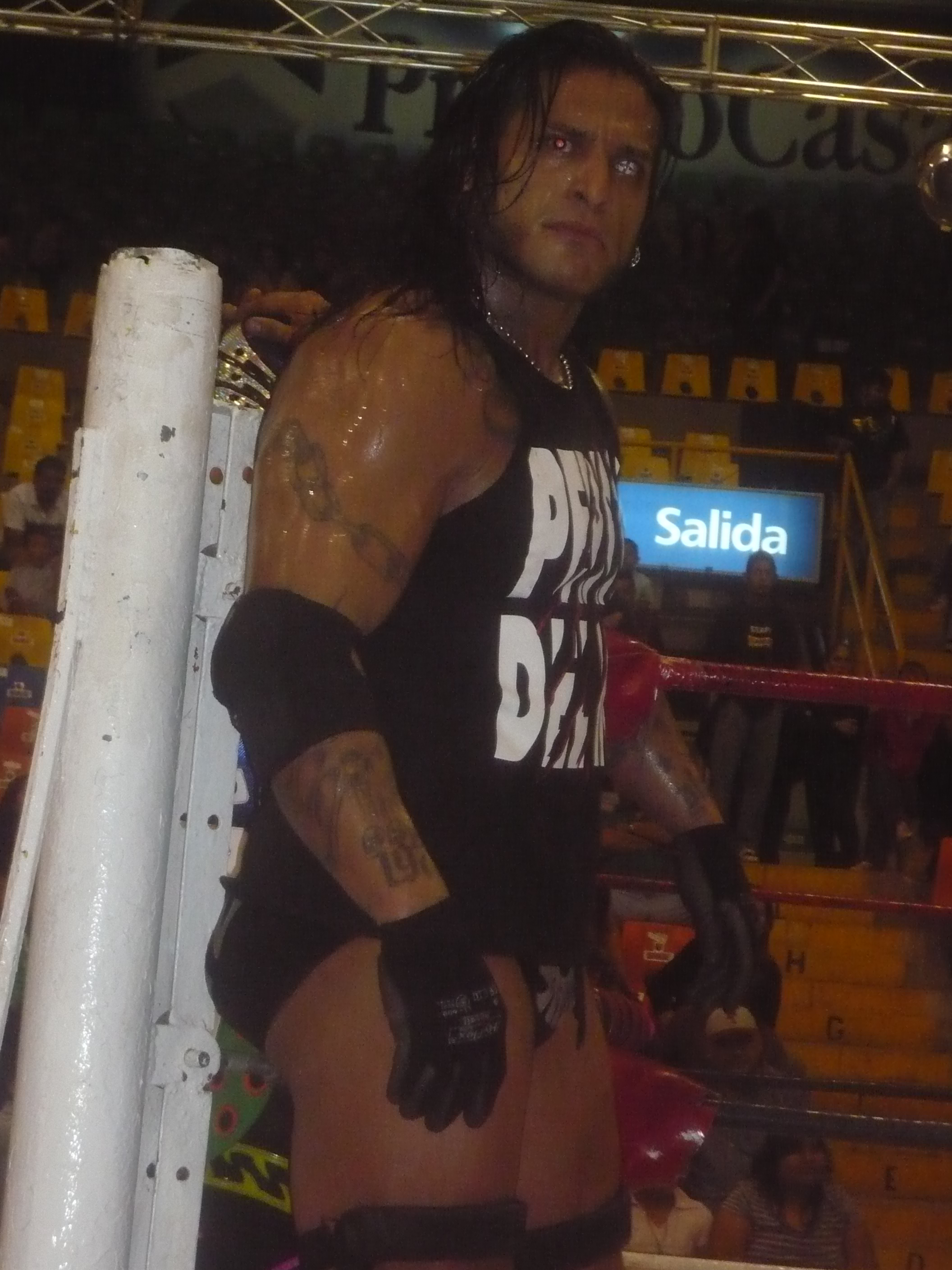
- Cibernético, wrestled in the semi-main event.
- Promotion: AAA
- Date: December 13, 1997
- City: Madero, Mexico
- Venue: Convention Center
- Attendance: 11,000

Pay-per-view chronology
← Previous; Verano de Escándalo	Next → Rey de Reyes

Guerra de Titanes chronology
← Previous; First	Next → 1998

Guerra de Titanes (1997) ("War of the Titans") was the first ever Guerra de Titanes professional wrestling show promoted by AAA. The show took place on December 13, 1997 in Ciudad Madero, Mexico. The Main event featured a Lucha de Apuestas "hair vs. hair" match contested inside a Steel Cage between the teams of Heavy Metal and Perro Aguayo Jr. and Picudo and Sangre Chicana.

== Production ==
=== Background ===
Starting in 1997 the Mexican professional wrestling, company AAA has held a major wrestling show late in the year, either November or December, called Guerra de Titanes ("War of the Titans"). The show often features championship matches or Lucha de Apuestas or bet matches where the competitors risked their wrestling mask or hair on the outcome of the match. In Lucha Libre the Lucha de Apuetas match is considered more prestigious than a championship match and a lot of the major shows feature one or more Apuesta matches. The Guerra de Titanes show is hosted by a new location each year, emanating from cities such as Madero, Chihuahua, Chihuahua, Mexico City, Guadalajara, Jalisco and more. The 1997 Guerra de Titanes show was the first show in the series.

=== Storylines ===
The Guerra de Titanes show featured five professional wrestling matches with different wrestlers involved in pre-existing, scripted feuds, plots, and storylines. Wrestlers were portrayed as either heels (referred to as rudos in Mexico, those that portray the "bad guys") or faces (técnicos in Mexico, the "good guy" characters) as they followed a series of tension-building events, which culminated in a wrestling match or series of matches.

== Results ==
No.	Results	Stipulations
1^{D}	Lady Discovery, Lady Luxor, Lady Venum and Xóchitl Hamada defeated La Fugitiva, La Migala, La Practicante, and Martha Villalobos	Eight-woman tag team match
2	Los Vipers (Psicosis, Histeria, Mosco de la Merced and Maniaco) defeated Máscara Sagráda Jr., La Parka, Venum and Cuervo	Eight-man "Atómicos" tag team match
3	Octagón, Antonio and Jorge Brennan defeated Fuerza Guerrera, Pentagón and Abismo Negro	Six-man "Lucha Libre rules" tag team match
4	Latin Lover, Perro Aguayo and Máscara Sagrada defeated Cibernético, El Cobarde and The Killer	Six-man "Lucha Libre rules" tag team match
5	Perro Aguayo Jr. defeated Picudo, match also included Heavy Metal and Sangre Chicana	Steel cage Lucha de Apuestas "hair vs. hair" match'
D / – this was a dark match
