= Guerra de Titanes (2011) =

2011 Lucha Libre AAA World Wide event

- Promotional poster featuring Dr. Wagner Jr., L.A. Park, El Mesías, Psycho Clown, Cibernético, La Parka and Octagón
- Promotion: AAA
- Date: December 16, 2011
- City: Puebla, Puebla
- Venue: Estadio Hermanos Serdán
- Attendance: 8,500

Pay-per-view chronology
← Previous; Héroes Inmortales	Next → Rey de Reyes

Guerra de Titanes chronology
← Previous; 2010	Next → 2012

Guerra de Titanes (Spanish for "War of the Titans") was a professional wrestling pay-per-view (PPV) event produced by the AAA promotion, which took place on December 16, 2011, at Estadio Hermanos Serdán in Puebla, Puebla, Mexico. The event was the fifteenth Guerra de Titanes end of the year show promoted by AAA since 1997. The event included appearances by Total Nonstop Action Wrestling (TNA) wrestlers A.J. Styles, D'Angelo Dinero, Gunner and Rob Terry as part of the ongoing storyline invasion of wrestlers from the American promotion. The pay-per-view was headlined by a match for the AAA Latin American Championship, between champion Dr. Wagner Jr. and challenger L.A. Park. The conclusion of the match led to the AAA debuts of Máscara Año 2000 Jr., El Texano Jr. and Toscano, starting a new storyline, where the three posed as invaders from rival promotion Consejo Mundial de Lucha Libre (CMLL).

== Production ==
=== Background ===
Starting in 1997 the Mexican professional wrestling, company AAA has held a major wrestling show late in the year, either November or December, called Guerra de Titanes ("War of the Titans"). The show often features championship matches or Lucha de Apuestas or bet matches where the competitors risked their wrestling mask or hair on the outcome of the match. In Lucha Libre the Lucha de Apuetas match is considered more prestigious than a championship match and a lot of the major shows feature one or more Apuesta matches. The Guerra de Titanes show is hosted by a new location each year, emanating from cities such as Madero, Chihuahua, Chihuahua, Mexico City, Guadalajara, Jalisco and more. The 2011 Guerra de Titanes show was the fourteenth show in the series.

=== Storylines ===
The Guerra de Titanes show featured nine professional wrestling matches with different wrestlers involved in pre-existing, scripted feuds, plots, and storylines. Wrestlers were portrayed as either heels (referred to as rudos in Mexico, those that portray the "bad guys") or faces (técnicos in Mexico, the "good guy" characters) as they followed a series of tension-building events, which culminated in a wrestling match or series of matches.

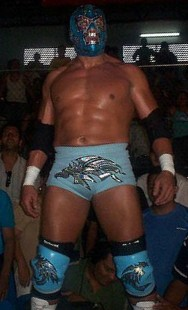
Dr. Wagner Jr., the defending AAA Latin American Champion

The long-running storyline rivalry between Dr. Wagner Jr. and L.A. Park, which had previously included teases for a Mask vs. Mask match at Triplemanía XX, heated up again on November 5, when the two were involved in two brawls with each other. On November 26, Wagner Jr., who was accompanied to the match by his son El Hijo de Dr. Wagner Jr., Psycho Clown and El Zorro defeated Park, Nicho el Millonario and Octagón in a six man tag team match via disqualification. After the match, Park attacked El Hijo de Dr. Wagner Jr., unmasking him and placing his mask over his own head. The attack led to Wagner Jr. accepting to defend the AAA Latin American Championship against Park at Guerra de Titanes, with his son in his corner.

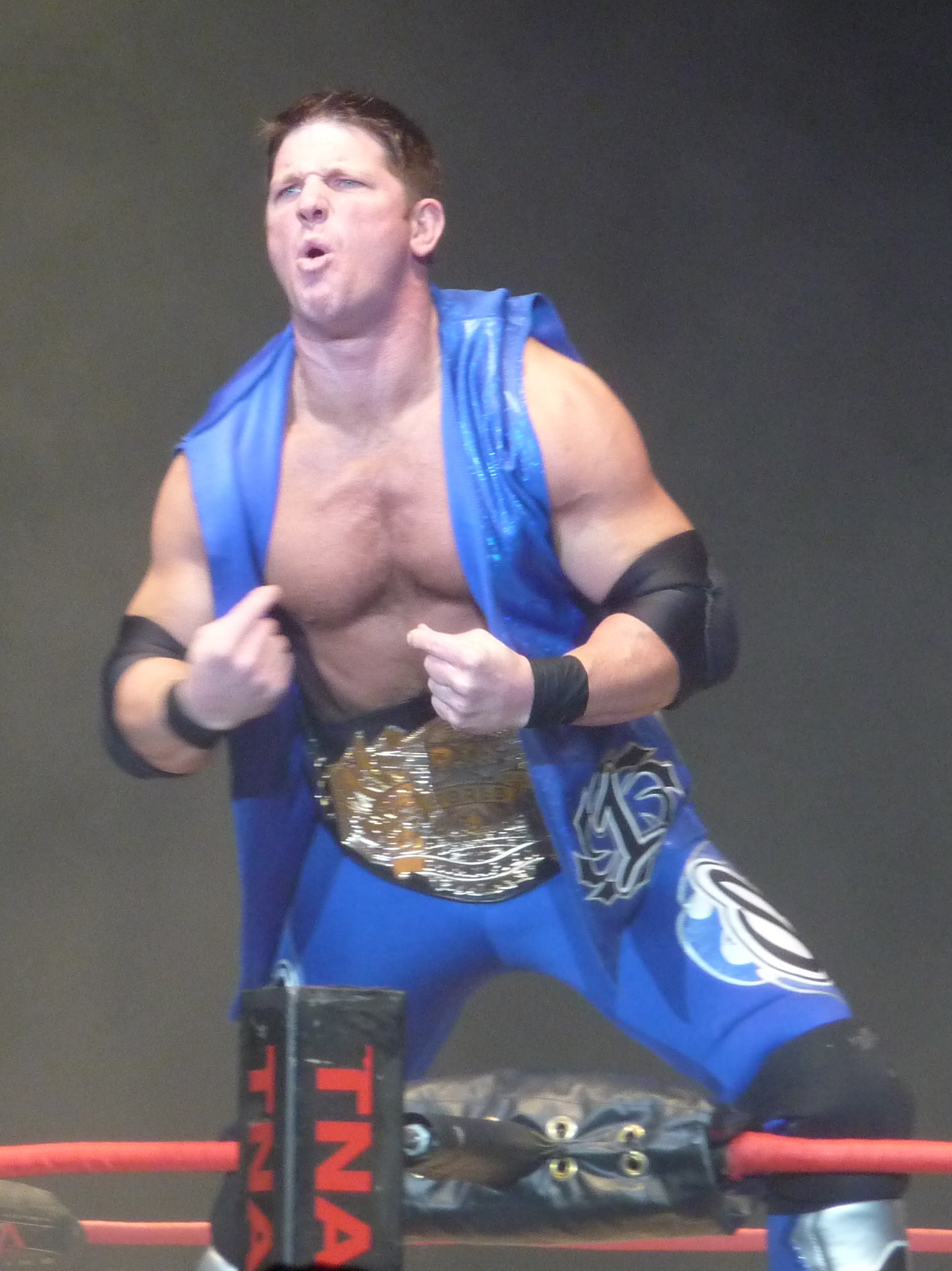
A.J. Styles

After losing the AAA World Tag Team Championship to La Sociedad members Abyss and Chessman on October 9 at Héroes Inmortales, AAA Cruiserweight Champion Jack Evans came back on November 14, picking up one of his biggest wins in AAA by cleanly pinning Los Perros del Mal leader El Hijo del Perro Aguayo in a tag team match, where he teamed with El Mesías and Aguayo teamed up with Chessman. After the match, the two victors were attacked by Héctor Garza, who made his first AAA appearance in seven years, having recently left rival promotion Consejo Mundial de Lucha Libre (CMLL). On November 26, Evans pinned Aguayo in another tag team match, this time teaming with Fénix, while Aguayo teamed with Halloween. Afterwards, both Evans and Fénix were bloodied by Los Perros del Mal with Fénix also having his mask torn to shreds. The attack led to Fénix challenging Los Perros del Mal to a match at Guerra de Titanes. On December 1, Evans and Fénix defeated Dark Dragon and Héctor Garza in Garza's AAA return match, after which Aguayo attacked Evans with a steel chair, bloodying him yet again, before being chased away by Drago, who made his return from an injury. On December 5 it was announced that at Guerra de Titanes, Drago, Fénix and Evans would face Aguayo, Garza and Halloween in a six man tag team match.

After Héroes Inmortales, where AAA Mega Champion Jeff Jarrett's plan of using fellow Total Nonstop Action Wrestling (TNA) worker Sting to get rid of title contender El Mesías had failed, Jarrett placed a $50,000 bounty on El Mesías' head. This led to TNA wrestler Gunner making his AAA debut on November 26, attacking El Mesías backstage. The attack was then used in storyline to explain El Mesías inability to compete against Gunner. On December 5, it was announced that TNA wrestler A.J. Styles would be making his first appearance for AAA in five years at Guerra de Titanes, where he would face El Mesías with the added stipulation that should El Mesías be victorious, he would be named the number one contender to Jarrett's AAA Mega Championship.

After turning on AAA and joining La Sociedad at Héroes Inmortales, La Parka and Octagón spent their first weeks as rudos explaining their turns. Parka blamed his turn on AAA for bringing back L.A. Park after his 15 years of loyal service, and the promotion's fans for choosing to root for both Park and Cibernético over him during his past two rivalries, while Octagón claimed that he was tired of AAA chief executive officer Joaquín Roldán's mismanagement of AAA and that his son, La Sociedad leader and AAA vice president Dorian Roldán's vision of AAA was closer to company founder Antonio Peña's original vision of the promotion. La Parka then continued his rivalry with Cibernético, while Octagón was named the new leader of La Sociedad sub-group La Milicia, kicking out former leader Super Fly as his first act. On December 1, Dorian Roldán surprisingly announced that he had recruited Cibernético into La Sociedad, however, Cibernético ended up turning on the rudo group, finalizing his técnico turn in the process. Following a run-in from Los Perros del Mal, Cibernético was bloodied and eventually stretchered out of the arena. On December 5, AAA announced a six man tag team match between AAA loyalists Cibernético, Electroshock and El Zorro and La Sociedad representatives La Parka, Octagón and Silver King.

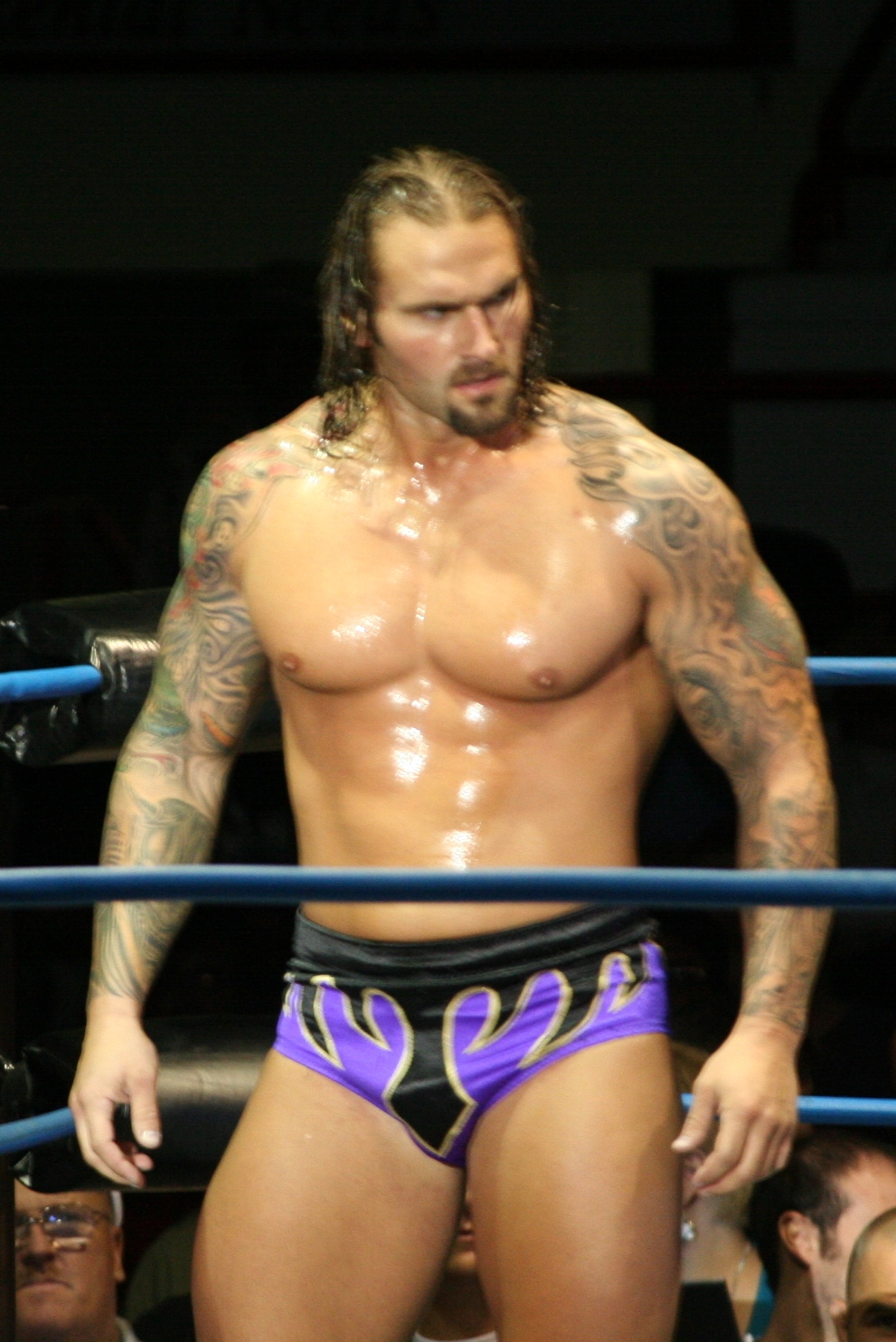
Gunner

At Héroes Inmortales, Los Psycho Circus ended their year-long rivalry with Los Perros del Mal, defeating the rudo group in a steel cage Masks vs. Hair match, after Joe Líder attacked his former La Hermandad 187 partner Nicho el Millonario, who had turned on him the previous July. On November 26, Líder and Extreme Tiger challenged Abyss and Chessman for the AAA World Tag Team Championship, but were defeated when Nicho interfered, hitting Líder with a steel chair and throwing a fireball to Tiger's face. On December 1, Nicho defeated Líder in a street fight, following interference from Halloween, and burned his La Hermandad 187 gear afterwards. On December 5 it was announced that at Guerra de Titanes, Nicho and his Perros del Mal stablemate X-Fly would team up to take on Líder and Extreme Tiger in a flaming tables match. While Nicho and Líder were continuing their rivalry, Los Psycho Circus had moved on from Los Perros del Mal, now becoming more involved with AAA's battle with the rest of La Sociedad, especially invaders from the TNA promotion. On November 26, Monster Clown replaced an injured El Mesías and took on TNA wrestler Gunner, losing the match following interference from La Sociedad members Konnan, Dark Dragon and Tito Santana. On December 5, AAA announced a six man tag team match for Guerra de Titanes between Los Psycho Circus and the team of Chessman and TNA wrestlers D'Angelo Dinero and Gunner, representing both La Sociedad and its sub-group La Legión Extranjera.

At Héroes Inmortales, exotico Cassandro returned to AAA after a three-and-a-half-year absence, saving AAA Reina de Reinas Champion Pimpinela Escarlata, who had for the past months suffered several beatdowns at the hands of fellow exoticos Nygma, Pasión Cristal, Polvo de Estrellas and Yuriko, who had grouped together through their jealousy of Escarlata's success. On November 5, Cassandro and Escarlata were joined by El Brazo, who debuted his exotico persona "La Braza", leveling the playing field in the battle between the técnico and rudo groups. On December 5 it was announced that at Guerra de Titanes, Pimpinela Escarlata would defend the Reina de Reinas Championship against La Sociedad member Sexy Star in a lumberjack match. The November 14 event in Irapuato, Guanajuato, saw not only the AAA return of Héctor Garza, but also another former CMLL worker, Mini-Estrella (midget wrestler) Mascarita Dorada, who made his first appearance for the promotion in four years. On November 30, it was announced that Dorada would wrestle his return match at Guerra de Titanes, teaming with Mascarita Divina and Octagóncito against AAA World Mini-Estrella Champion Mini Psicosis, Mini Chessman and Mini Histeria in a six man tag team match.

== Event ==
=== Preliminary matches ===
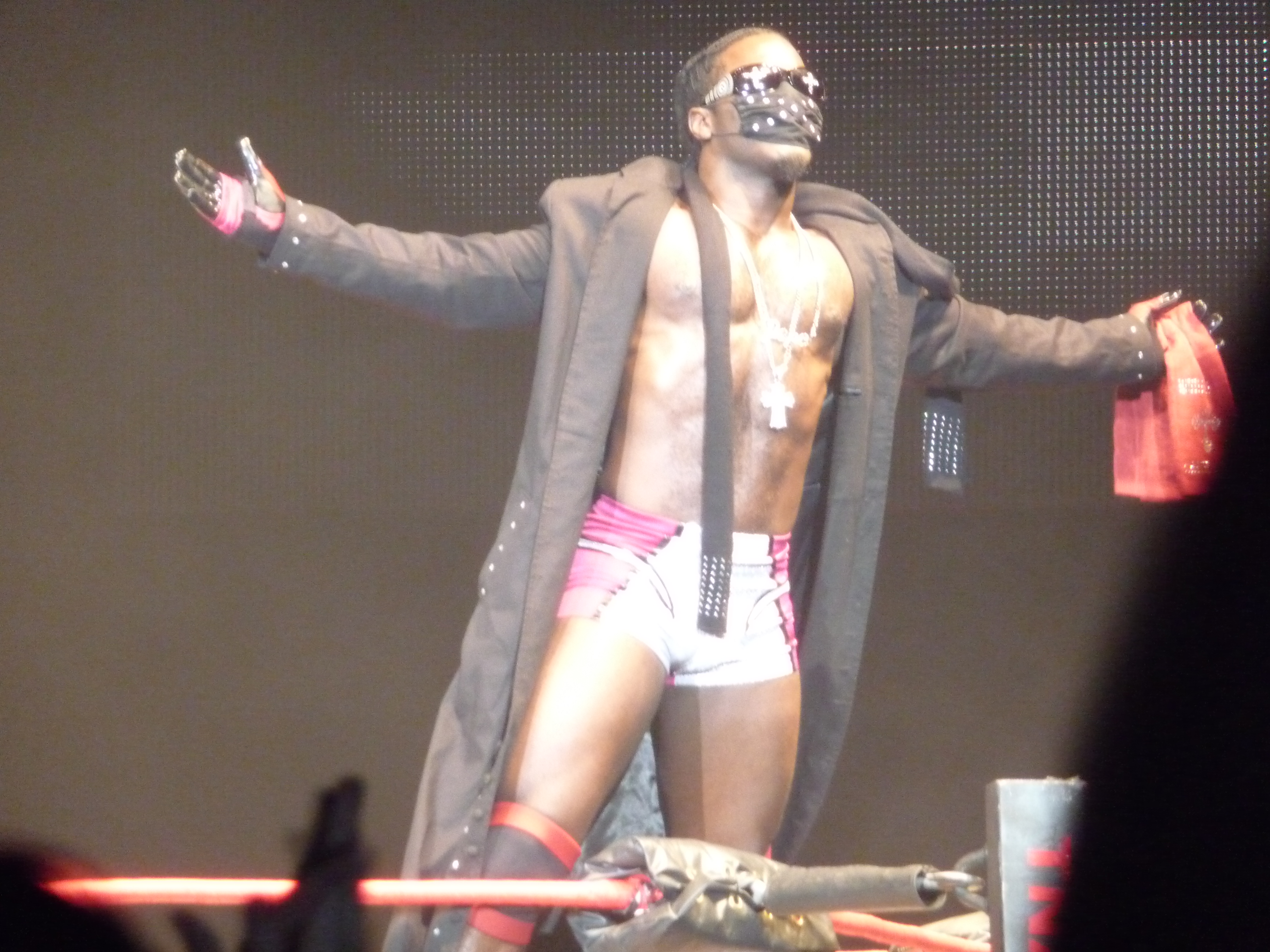
D'Angelo Dinero

The opening match of Guerra de Titanes featured the AAA Mini-Estrellas, with Mascarita Divina, Mascarita Dorada and Octagóncito taking on Mini Chessman, Mini Histeria and Mini Psicosis. The técnico team won the match, after Mascarita Divina and Octagóncito took out Mini Histeria and Mini Chessman with suicide dives, after which Mascarita Dorada pinned AAA World Mini-Estrella Champion Mini Psicosis with a double springboard moonsault. After the match, Octagóncito took the house microphone and announced how ashamed he was Octagón recent behaviour. This led to Octagón coming out, confronting and eventually attacking his mini version.

The second match featured Pimpinela Escarlata defending the AAA Reina de Reinas Championship against Sexy Star in a lumberjack match. As opposed to what was being advertised prior to the event, Escarlata was accompanied to the ring by La Braza, not Cassandro, while Sexy Star was accompanied by La Legión Extranjera leader Konnan. The lumberjacks for the match included El Apache, Mascarita Divina, Mascarita Dorada, Mini Chessman, Mini Histeria, Mini Psicosis, Nygma, Pasión Cristal and Polvo de Estrellas. Towards the end of the match, Cristal illegally entered the ring, but was taken out by Escarlata. As referee Copetes Salazar was trying to get Cristal out of the ring, Escarlata leapt off his back to dropkick Sexy Star. When Salazar confronted Escarlata on the move, Escarlata answered by kissing him. As Salazar was trying to recover, Konnan entered the ring with a baseball bat covered in barbed wire, but dropped the bat after being kissed by La Braza. Sexy Star took advantage of the distraction, hit Escarlata in the back with the bat and then pinned him with a schoolboy to become the new Reina de Reinas Champion, starting her second reign as the champion.

In the third match, Extreme Tiger and Joe Líder took on Los Perros del Mal representatives Nicho el Millonario and X-Fly in a Flaming Tables match. To win the match, a wrestler had to be put through a flaming table. In the end, Líder lit a table on fire, but when he went to put X-Fly through it with a Spanish Fly, he caught only the edge of the table and did not break it, managing only to kill the flame. Tiger then lit another table on fire and put Nicho through it with a super hurricanrana for the win.

The fourth match saw Chessman teaming with TNA wrestlers D'Angelo Dinero and Gunner against Los Psycho Circus. After Los Psycho Circus managed to isolate Dinero from his partners, Monster Clown lifted him up to Murder Clown sitting on the top rope, who then dropped him down to the mat with a superbomb for the win. After the match, the Gunner attacked the clowns and was setting Monster Clown for a move, before being chased out of the ring by Murder and Psycho Clown.

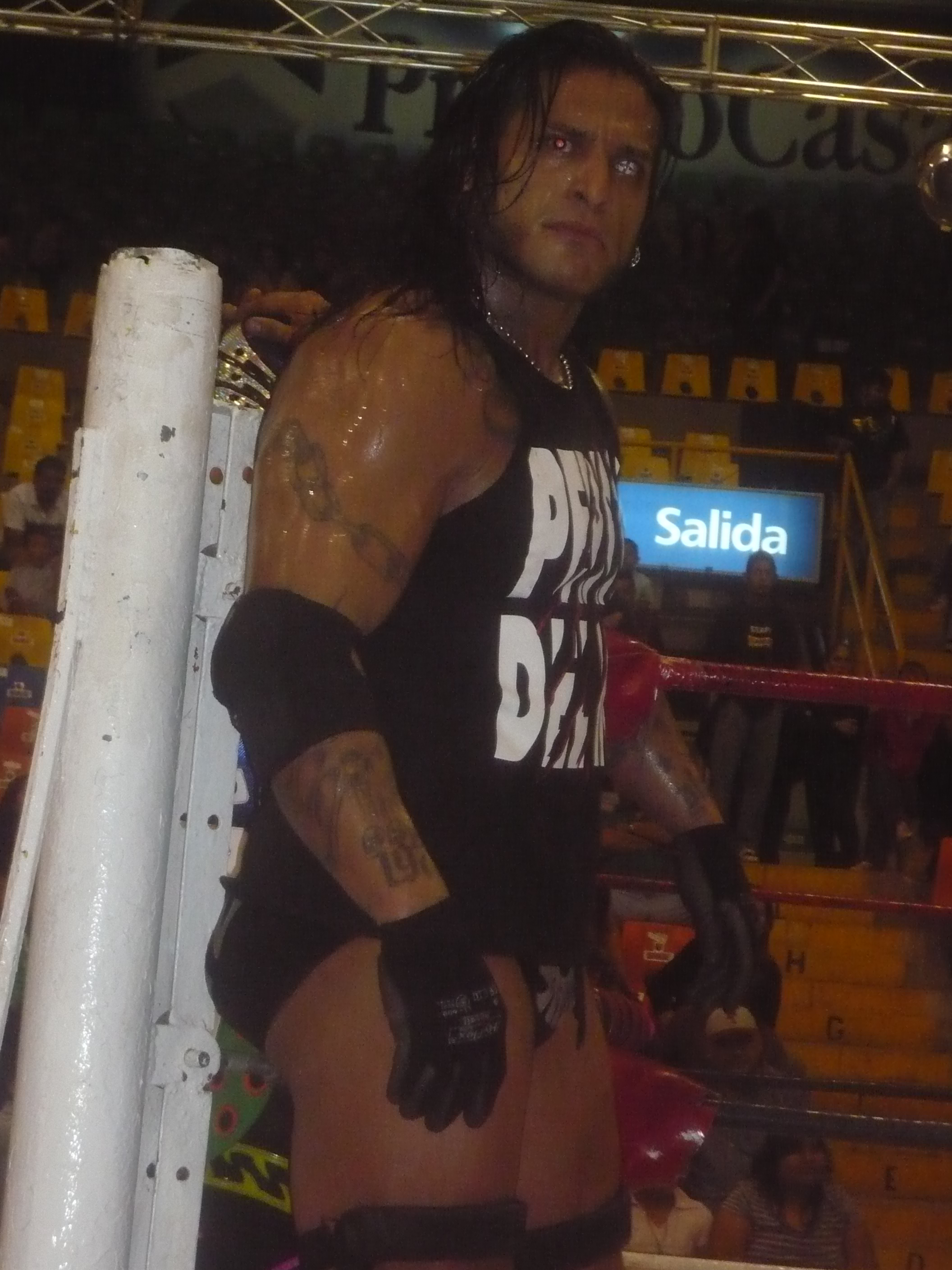
Cibernético

In the fifth match of the pay-per-view, Ejército AAA members Cibernético, Electroshock and El Zorro took on La Sociedad members La Parka, Octagón and Silver King. Electroshock and Silver King were accompanied to the match by their midget companions, Lokillo and Maniaquito, respectively. The rudos took control of the match with steel chairs and a run-in from Tigre Cota and Tito Santana, members of Octagón's La Milicia. Eventually Cibernético mounted a comeback and performed a stunner on his longtime rival, La Parka. Electroshock then entered the ring and hit a cutter on Octagón, after which El Zorro hit Parka, Santana, Cota and Silver King with his kendo stick. Finally, Cibernético re-entered the ring and pinned Silver King for the win with a Garra Cibernetica. After the match, the rudos attacked the victors, with La Parka beating Cibernético with a steel chair, before being chased out of the ring by members of his Los Bizarros group.

=== Main event matches ===
In the sixth match El Mesías took on TNA wrestler A.J. Styles in an attempt to earn a shot at the AAA Mega Championship. Towards the end of the match, Styles set up for his finishing maneuver, Styles Clash, but El Mesías got out of it and hit a spear. Styles then came back with a Pelé, but when he went for the Superman, El Mesías blocked it with his knees. After a double knee backbreaker and a Mesías Splash, El Mesías scored the three count to become the number one contender to the title held by Jeff Jarrett. After the match, Dorian Roldán and Konnan appeared and informed the exhausted El Mesías that he had been booked in another match, which led to TNA wrestler Rob Terry making his entrance to start the match. With help from a steel chair, Terry dominated the match early on, but eventually El Mesías managed to turn the tables and sent Terry onto a steel chair placed in the corner. This was followed by El Mesías pinning Terry with a schoolboy for his second victory of the night. After the match, Terry attacked El Mesías, but was quickly taken down by Dark Cuervo and Dark Ozz, who made their return from a tour of All Japan Pro Wrestling (AJPW). However, Cuervo and Ozz were then themselves overpowered by D'Angelo Dinero and Gunner, which led to El Vampiro Canadiense making his first AAA appearance in a year and chasing them out of the ring. Vampiro took the house microphone and proclaimed his hate for Konnan and his loyalty to AAA, while also apologizing to Joaquín Roldán for his past behaviour. Roldan made an appearance to accept the apology and welcome Vampiro back to the promotion. The segment ended with El Mesías announcing that he whether Jarrett liked it or not, he was going to bring the AAA Mega Championship back to Mexico sooner or later.

The eighth match of the evening featured Drago, Fénix and Jack Evans continuing their rivalry with Los Perros del Mal, represented by Halloween, Héctor Garza and El Hijo del Perro Aguayo. The match was built around the rivalry between Aguayo and Evans with both men bleeding early on, after busting each other open. Towards the end of the match, Aguayo performed a Lanza on Evans, while Fénix pounced on Garza with a standing moonsault. As Fénix was setting for a moonsault from the top rope, Aguayo hit him in the back with a steel chair, after which Garza dropped him to the mat with an inverted superplex. Garza then hit Fénix with a package facebuster, which was enough for a three count and a win. During Los Perros del Mal's post-match celebration, Halloween unmasked Fénix.

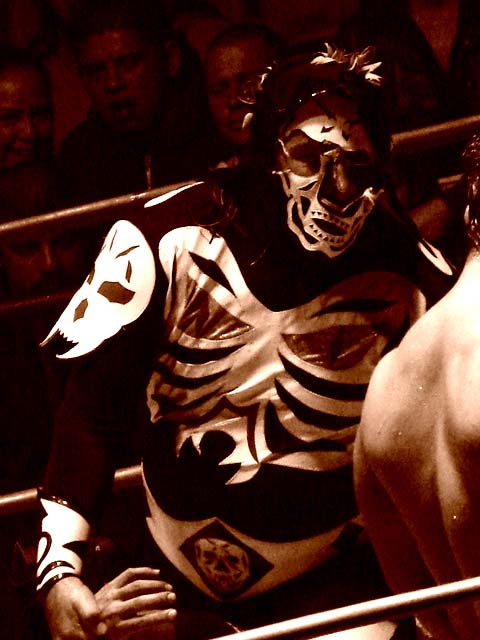
L.A. Park, the new AAA Latin American Champion

The final match of the evening saw Dr. Wagner Jr. defending the AAA Latin American Championship against L.A. Park. Wagner Jr. was accompanied to the ring by his son, while Park was accompanied by Octagón. Before the start of the match, Toscano, another former CMLL, who had recently left the promotion, made an appearance and declared that "they" were better than AAA, raising the ire of Wagner Jr. After being punched down by Wagner, Toscano was carried out of the arena by members of the AAA security crew. During the early part of the brawl, the competitors tore each other's masks apart. While Park distracted the referee Copetes Salazar, Octagón entered the ring to attack Wagner Jr. This led to Octagóncito making an appearance and attacking Octagón. When Wagner Jr. his Park with a sitout powerbomb, the rudo Salazar refused to perform a three count, faking an arm injury. Salazar then attempted to pull Wagner off Park, but was accidentally hit by a dive from Park. Wagner performed a La Casita on Park, but there was no referee to make the count. As Wagner was trying to wake Salazar up, Park hit him with a low blow. When a replaced referee, Piero, ran to the ring, Park performed a double knee gutbuster, but after it resulted in only a two count, Park took out his frustration on Piero, throwing him out of the ring. Wagner then hit Park with a DDT and a top rope double knee facebreaker, but again there was no referee to make the count. Octagón then threw brass knuckles to Park, which led to El Hijo de Dr. Wagner Jr. entering to ring to clothesline him. Octagón then entered the ring and attacked El Hijo de Dr. Wagner Jr., but was quickly taken out himself by Wagner Jr.'s Wagner Driver. In the commotion, Park got his hands on the brass knuckles, hit Wagner Jr. with them and pinned him to become the new AAA Latin American Championship, after Copetes Salazar performed a fast count.

After the match, Toscano re-entered the arena and attacked the Wagners along with Máscara Año 2000 Jr. and El Texano Jr., two more former CMLL wrestlers, all wearing shirts that read "El Consejo". Meanwhile, L.A. Park received his title belt and left the ring unharmed by the invaders. El Texano Jr. then took the house microphone and challenged both AAA and La Sociedad, before the trio was chased out of the ring by Los Psycho Circus.

== Aftermath ==
On December 20, at AAA's final television tapings of 2011, El Consejo established themselves as the third major group, outside of both AAA and La Sociedad, by doing several run-in attacks on not only AAA loyalists Argenis, Atomic Boy, Fénix and Los Psycho Circus, but also La Sociedad members Halloween and Octagón, while once again leaving L.A. Park unharmed. With Park, Konnan, Dorian Roldán and Joaquín Roldán all claiming that they had nothing to do with El Consejo arriving to the promotion, Konnan came to the conclusion that one of them was lying. On January 21, 2012, Mortiz and Semental, both former CMLL wrestlers who had jumped to AAA in June 2011, joined El Consejo, becoming the group's fourth and fifth member.

== Results ==
No.	Results	Stipulations	Times
1	Mascarita Divina, Mascarita Dorada and Octagóncito defeated Mini Chessman, Mini Histeria and Mini Psicosis	Six-man tag team match	10:35
2	Sexy Star (with Konnan) defeated Pimpinela Escarlata (c) (with La Braza)	Lumberjack match for the AAA Reina de Reinas Championship	08:59
3	Extreme Tiger and Joe Líder defeated Los Perros del Mal (Nicho el Millonario and X-Fly)	Flaming tables match	13:47
4	Los Psycho Circus (Monster Clown, Murder Clown and Psycho Clown) (with Mini Clown) defeated La Legión Extranjera (Chessman, D'Angelo Dinero and Gunner)	Six-man tag team match	10:11
5	Ejército AAA (Cibernético, Electroshock and El Zorro) (with Lokillo) defeated La Sociedad (La Parka, Octagón and Silver King) (with Maniaquito)	Six-man tag team match	10:27
6	El Mesías defeated A.J. Styles	Singles match	17:52
7	El Mesías defeated Rob Terry	Singles match	04:18
8	Los Perros del Mal (Halloween, Héctor Garza and El Hijo del Perro Aguayo) defeated Drago, Fénix and Jack Evans	Six-man tag team match	14:15
9	L.A. Park (with Octagón) defeated Dr. Wagner Jr. (c) (with El Hijo de Dr. Wagner Jr.)	Singles match for the AAA Latin American Championship	21:37
(c) / – the champion(s) heading into the match
