= Guerra de Titanes (1999) =

1999 Lucha Libre AAA World Wide event

Guerra de Titanes 1999
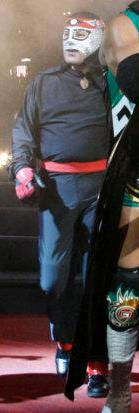
- Octagón, kept his mask in the main event
- Promotion: AAA
- Date: December 10, 1999
- City: Madero, Mexico
- Venue: Convention Center
- Attendance: 13,000

Pay-per-view chronology
← Previous; Verano de Escándalo	Next → Rey de Reyes

Guerra de Titanes chronology
← Previous; 1998	Next → 2000

Guerra de Titanes (1999) ("War of the Titans") was the third Guerra de Titanes professional wrestling show promoted by AAA. The show took place on December 10, 1999 in Madero, Mexico. The Main event featured a Lucha de Apuestas "mask vs. mask" under Street fight rules. Octagón faced Jaque Mate to see which wrestler had to unmask.

== Production ==
=== Background ===
Starting in 1997 the Mexican professional wrestling, company AAA has held a major wrestling show late in the year, either November or December, called Guerra de Titanes ("War of the Titans"). The show often features championship matches or Lucha de Apuestas or bet matches where the competitors risked their wrestling mask or hair on the outcome of the match. In Lucha Libre the Lucha de Apuetas match is considered more prestigious than a championship match and a lot of the major shows feature one or more Apuesta matches. The Guerra de Titanes show is hosted by a new location each year, emanating from cities such as Madero, Chihuahua, Chihuahua, Mexico City, Guadalajara, Jalisco and more. The 1999 Guerra de Titanes show was the third show in the series.

=== Storylines ===
The Guerra de Titanes show featured six professional wrestling matches with different wrestlers involved in pre-existing, scripted feuds, plots, and storylines. Wrestlers were portrayed as either heels (referred to as rudos in Mexico, those that portray the "bad guys") or faces (técnicos in Mexico, the "good guy" characters) as they followed a series of tension-building events, which culminated in a wrestling match or series of matches.

== Results ==
No.	Results	Stipulations	Times
1	Faby Apache, Alda Moreno and Cinthia Moreno defeated Tiffany, Rosy Moreno and Miss Janeth	Six-man "Lucha Libre rules" tag team match	08:14
2	La Parka, Héctor Garza, El Oriental and Máscara Sagráda defeated El Hijo del Solitario, Abismo Negro, Electroshock, Blue Demon Jr.	Eight-man "Atómicos" tag team match	09:58
3	Heavy Metal and Perro Aguayo Jr. defeated Abidies Irison and Kick Boxer	Six-man "Lucha Libre rules" tag team match	08:01
4	Los Vatos Locos (Charley Manson, Nygma, May Flowers and Picudo) defeated Los Vipers (Maniaco, Histeria, Psicosis and Mosco de la Merced)	Eight-man "Atómicos" tag team match for the Mexican National Atómicos Championship	12:48
5	Canek, Dos Caras and El Alebrije defeated Cibernético, Doink "the Clown" and Tiger Steele by disqualification	Six-man "Lucha Libre rules" tag team match	18:23
6	Octagón defeated Jaque Mate	Lucha de Apuestas "mask vs. mask" street fight match	20:34
