= Guerra de Titanes (2008) =

2008 Lucha Libre AAA World Wide event

Guerra de Titanes 2008
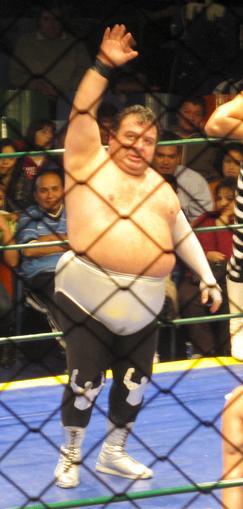
- Brazo de Plata, was able to climb out of the cage in the main event
- Promotion: AAA
- Date: December 6, 2008
- City: Orizaba, Mexico
- Venue: Plaza de toros La Concordia
- Attendance: 15,000

Pay-per-view chronology
| ← Previous; Antonio Peña Memorial Show | Next → Rey de Reyes |

Guerra de Titanes chronology
| ← Previous; 2007 | Next → 2009 |

Guerra de Titanes (2008) ("War of the Titans") was the twelfth annual Guerra de Titanes professional wrestling show promoted by AAA. The show took place on December 6, 2008 in Orizaba, Mexico, the same venue used for the 2006 and 2007 events. The Main event featured a Ladder match for the vacant AAA Mega Championship between El Mesias and El Zorro and saw Mesias win the match to become a two time champion. In addition to the main event the show featured a Steel Cage Match Lucha de Apuestas where the last man left in the cage would have his hair shaved off. The participants in the cage match were brothers El Brazo and Brazo de Plata as well as Pirata Morgan, Electroshock, Super Fly and El Elegido and saw El Brazo shaved bald as a result of his loss. As is tradition with AAA major events the wrestlers compete inside a hexagonal wrestling ring and not the four sided ring the promotion uses for television events and House shows.

== Production ==
=== Background ===
Starting in 1997 the Mexican professional wrestling, company AAA has held a major wrestling show late in the year, either November or December, called Guerra de Titanes ("War of the Titans"). The show often features championship matches or Lucha de Apuestas or bet matches where the competitors risked their wrestling mask or hair on the outcome of the match. In Lucha Libre the Lucha de Apuetas match is considered more prestigious than a championship match and a lot of the major shows feature one or more Apuesta matches. The Guerra de Titanes show is hosted by a new location each year, emanating from cities such as Madero, Chihuahua, Chihuahua, Mexico City, Guadalajara, Jalisco and more. The 2008 Guerra de Titanes show was the eleventh show in the series.

=== Storylines ===
The Guerra de Titanes show featured six professional wrestling matches with different wrestlers involved in pre-existing, scripted feuds, plots, and storylines. Wrestlers were portrayed as either heels (referred to as rudos in Mexico, those that portray the "bad guys") or faces (técnicos in Mexico, the "good guy" characters) as they followed a series of tension-building events, which culminated in a wrestling match or series of matches.

== Results ==
| No. | Results | Stipulations | Times |
|---|---|---|---|
| 1 | El Oriental and Cinthia Moreno defeated Gran Apache and Faby Apache (c) | Tag team match for the AAA World Mixed Tag Team Championship | 06:05 |
| 2 | La Hermandad Extrema (Joe Líder and Nicho el Millonario) (c) vs. Hartfoundation 2.0 (Jack Evans and Teddy Hart) ended in a double count out | Tag team match for the AAA World Tag Team Championship | 10:32 |
| 3 | D-Generation-Mex (Alex Koslov, Rocky Romero and X-Pac defeated the Black Family (Dark Cuervo, Dark Escoria and Dark Ozz) | Six-man "Lucha Libre rules" tag team match | 05:16 |
| 4 | La Legión Extranjera (El Padrino, Rellik and Kenzo Suzuki) defeated Alan Stone, Octagón and La Parka | Six-man "Lucha Libre rules" tag team match | 11:40 |
| 5 | Latin Lover defeated Konnan by pinfall | Singles match | 06:17 |
| 6 | El Mesias defeated El Zorro | Ladder match for the vacant AAA Mega Championship with Charly Manson as the special guest referee | 15:18 |
| 7 | El Brazo lost to Pirata Morgan, Electroshock, Super Fly, Brazo de Plata and El Elegido | Steel Cage Match Luchas de Apuestas "Last man in the cage has his hair shaved". As a result El Brazo had his hair shaved off. | 08:16 |
(c) / – the champion(s) heading into the match
