= Guerra de Titanes (1998) =

1998 Lucha Libre AAA World Wide event

Guerra de Titanes 1998
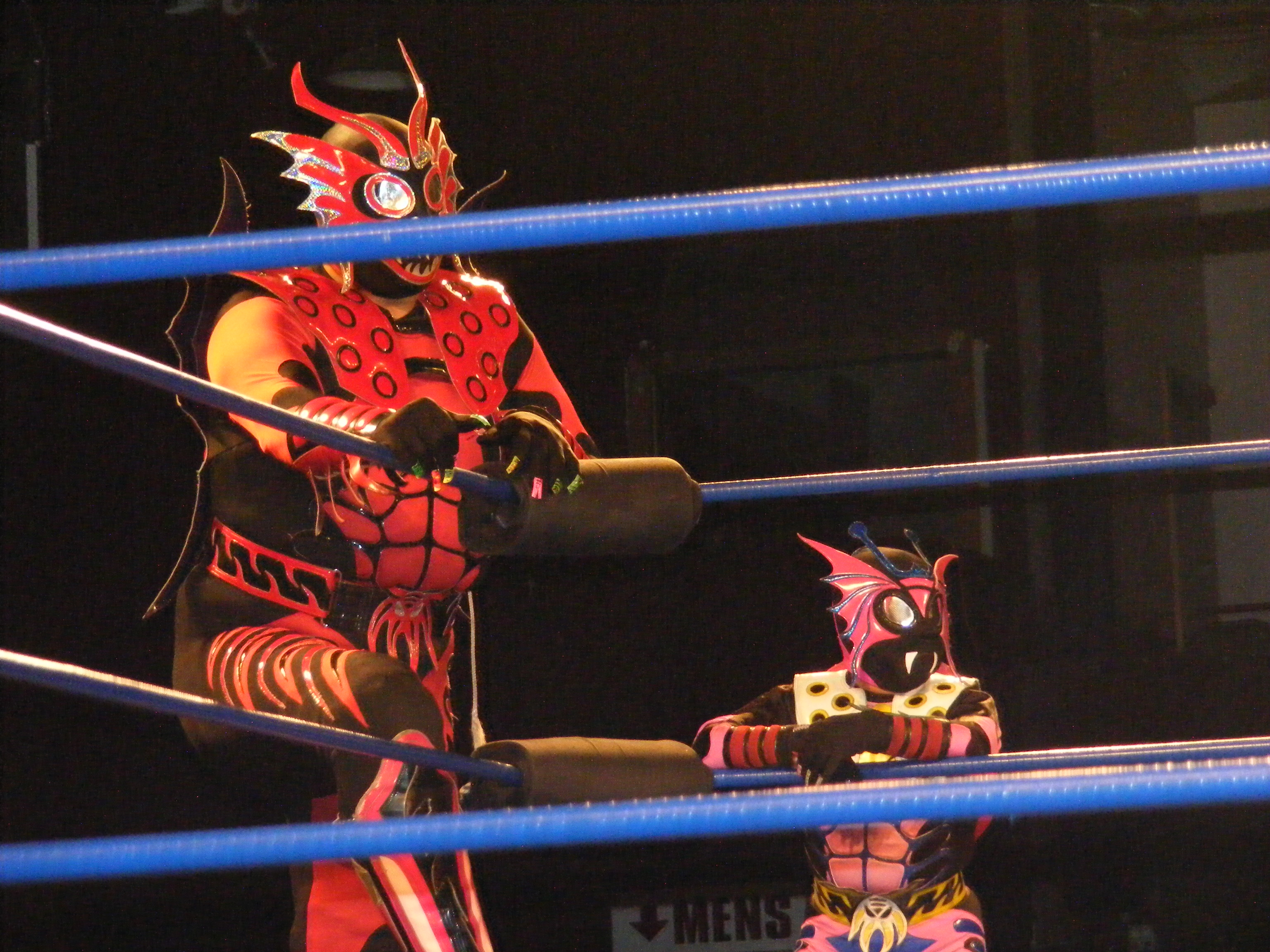
- El Alebrije, worked the semi-main event
- Promotion: AAA
- Date: December 13, 1998
- City: Chihuahua, Chihuahua, Mexico
- Venue: Aguirre Gym
- Attendance: 8,000

Pay-per-view chronology
← Previous; Verano de Escándalo	Next → Rey de Reyes

Guerra de Titanes chronology
← Previous; 1997	Next → 1999

Guerra de Titanes (1998) ("War of the Titans") was the second Guerra de Titanes professional wrestling show promoted by AAA. The show took place on December 13, 1998 in Chihuahua, Chihuahua, Mexico. The Main event featured a Steel Cage Match that highlighted two storyline feuds between Octagón and his "Evil twin" Pentagón and the feud between Heavy Metal and Kick Boxer as Octagón and Heavy Metal teamed together to take on Pentagón and Kick Boxer.

== Production ==
=== Background ===
Starting in 1997 the Mexican professional wrestling, company AAA has held a major wrestling show late in the year, either November or December, called Guerra de Titanes ("War of the Titans"). The show often features championship matches or Lucha de Apuestas or bet matches where the competitors risked their wrestling mask or hair on the outcome of the match. In Lucha Libre the Lucha de Apuestas match is considered more prestigious than a championship match and a lot of the major shows feature one or more Apuesta matches. The Guerra de Titanes show is hosted by a new location each year, emanating from cities such as Madero, Chihuahua, Chihuahua, Mexico City, Guadalajara, Jalisco and more. The 1998 Guerra de Titanes show was the second show in the series.

=== Storylines ===
The Guerra de Titanes show featured four professional wrestling matches with different wrestlers involved in pre-existing, scripted feuds, plots, and storylines. Wrestlers were portrayed as either heels (referred to as rudos in Mexico, those that portray the "bad guys") or faces (técnicos in Mexico, the "good guy" characters) as they followed a series of tension-building events, which culminated in a wrestling match or series of matches.

== Results ==
No.	Results	Stipulations	Times
1	Los Vatos Locos (Nygma, Charly Manson, May Flowers, and Picudo) defeated Los Vipers (Mosco de la Merced, Maniaco, Psicosis, and Histeria)	Eight-man "Atómicos" tag team match	10:41
2	Abismo Negro (c) defeated The Panther	Singles match for the Mexican National Middleweight Championship	14:12
3	Alebrije, Latin Lover and Perro Aguayo defeated Los Consagrados (Sangre Chicana, El Cobarde and Espectro Jr.	Six-man Lucha Libre rules tag team match	—
4	Octagón and Heavy Metal defeated Pentagón and Kick Boxer	Steel cage match	20:10
(c) / – the champion(s) heading into the match
