= Super Caló =

Mexican professional wrestler (born 1971)

Personal information
- Born: Rafael García; February 22, 1971 (age 55) Guadalajara, Jalisco, Mexico

Professional wrestling career
- Ring name(s): Bello Greco, Jr. El Hijo de Superzán; Jordy Stone; Love Warrior; Super Caló; Super Calo
- Billed height: 1.78 m (5 ft 10 in)
- Billed weight: 89 kg (196 lb)
- Trained by: Bello Greco; Pepe Casas
- Debut: August 5, 1990

Rafael García (born February 22, 1971) is a Mexican professional wrestler, better known under his ring name Super Caló. García is a long-time mainstay of AAA, but is perhaps best known outside Mexico for his stint in World Championship Wrestling (WCW) during the 1990s.

== Professional wrestling career ==
García made his debut in 1990 wrestling under the ring name "Bello Greco, Jr." after his father who had worked as Bello Greco for many years. He would later work under a mask as Hijo de Superzán ("Son of Superzan") as well.

=== Asistencia Asesoría y Administración (1992–1995) ===
In 1992 Antonio Peña founded Asistencia Asesoría y Administración, later known simply as AAA, with the express intention to feature young, high flying wrestlers. Peña signed García to a contract and then together they created the ring character García would be best known under, Super Caló, named after the Mexican Rock band Caló. The character wore a very flashy silver mask with markings that looked like sunglasses and a back turned cap, giving Super Caló a Rapper character. He would regularly team with Winners, another young high flying wrestler who wore a silver and black mask similar to Super Caló's. The team began frequently teamed with Rey Misterio, Jr., fighting against the veteran rúdo (bad guy) trio known as Los Diabólicos ("The Diabolical Ones", Ángel Mortan, Marabunta and Mr. Condor). The feud saw the técnico (good guy) faction unmask each Diabolical in turn through a series of Lucha de Apuesta, or bet matches, which Caló, Winners and Rey Misterio, Jr. won. On June 30, 1995, at Triplemanía III-C, Super Caló and Winners teamed up to participate in another "mask vs. mask" match. The duo lost the tag team match and were forced to wrestle each other with their mask on the line. The match saw Super Caló pin Winners, forcing him to unmask after the match. Despite losing his mask to Super Caló the two continued to work together as a team for more than a year after the mask loss.

=== World Championship Wrestling ===
In 1996, Super Caló was one of the many AAA wrestlers that started working for the World Championship Wrestling (WCW) promotion. He received his first title shot at Fall Brawl against WCW Cruiserweight Champion Rey Mysterio, Jr. but on the night Caló was unable to win the match. Caló never achieved much success in WCW, opting to return to Mexico after working for the company off and on for a couple of years.

=== Return to Asesoría y Administración ===
Super Caló returned to AAA in early-2007 to partner with Gran Apache against rivals Laredo Kid and Super Fly. The feud came to an end at Triplemanía XV where the four met in a Relevos Suicidas tag team match which pitted Super Caló and Super Fly against El Gran Apache and Laredo Kid. Gran Apache and Laredo Kid defeated Super Caló and Super Fly and just at a previous Triplemanía Super Caló had to wrestle his tag team partner with his mask on the line. On the night Super Fly gained the victory, unmasking Super Caló after 15 years under the mask.

After the loss of his mask, he revealed that his name was "Jordy Stone"; while it was a ring name it did reveal that he was the brother of Alan and Chris Stone, who were working for AAA at the time. The Stone Brothers were part of Guapos VIP, a group Jordy Stone also joined. The Stone brothers' allegiance to Guapos VIP was short-lived as they turned on the group to form a técnico group called Los Bello Stones a group with a similar "metrosexual" gimmick as Guapos VIP. García reverted to his Super Caló name at that point since that was the name he was most known under. Los Guapos brought in Decnnis to even the sides between the two groups. At Verano de Escandalo 2007 Guapos VIP defeated Los Bello Stones in one of the featured matches of the night. The highlight of the feud between Guapos VIP and Los Bello Stone came at the 2007 Guerra de Titanes where the two groups clashed in a Steel Cage Match under Lucha de Apuesta rules that Guapos VIP leader Scorpio, Jr. lost and thus had to have his hair shaved off as a result of losing the match for Guapos VIP. Not long after the cage match both Super Caló and his brother Chris left AAA, while Alan remained with the company.

=== Independent circuit ===
After leaving AAA García announced that he was opening his own wrestling promotion and wrestling school called Free Style Wrestling: World League (FSW:WL, or FSW for short). On August 31, 2009, he participated in a multi-man cage match under Lucha de Apuesta rules. The match came down to Super Caló and El Intocable and saw Intocable win.

== Personal life ==
García has two brothers named Alan and Chris Stone, who also wrestle in different promotions. His father, a former wrestler who worked as El Bello Greco, died on November 27, 2015.

== Championships and accomplishments ==
- International Wrestling Revolution Group
  - Distrito Federal Trios Championship (1 time) – with Moto Cross and Alan Stone
- Latin American Wrestling Association
  - LAWA Heavyweight Championship (1 time)
- Pro Wrestling Illustrated
  - PWI ranked him #273 of the 500 best singles wrestlers of the PWI 500 in 2003
- Promo Azteca
  - Aztecas Middleweight Championship (1 time)

== Luchas de Apuestas record ==
Winner (wager)	Loser (wager)	Location	Event	Date	Notes
Super Caló (mask)	Bestia Negra III (hair)	Mexico City	Live event	October 15, 1992	
Super Caló (mask)	Ángel Mortal (mask)	Orizaba, Veracruz	Triplemanía III-A	June 10, 1995	
Super Caló (mask)	Winners (mask)	Nuevo Laredo, Tamaulipas	Triplemanía III-C	June 30, 1995	
Damián 666 (hair)	Super Caló (hair)	Nuevo Laredo, Tamaulipas	Live event	November 13, 2000	(Note: Super Caló wagered his hair, despite being masked.)
Super Fly (mask)	Super Caló (mask)	Mexico City	Triplemanía XV	July 7, 2007	(Note: Lost a Relevos Suicidas tag team match that also included Laredo Kid and Gran Apache.)
El Intocable (mask)	Super Caló (hair)	Tultitlán, State of Mexico	Live event	September 8, 2008	(Note: Cage match that also included El Fantasma, El Hijo del Anibal, Máscara Año 2000 Jr., El Solar, Dr. Wagner Jr., Zumbido, Lizmark Jr. and Toscano)
