= Guerra de Titanes (2010) =

2010 Lucha Libre AAA World Wide event

- Promotional poster featuring Los Bizarros
- Promotion: AAA
- Date: December 5, 2010
- City: Zapopan, Jalisco, Mexico
- Venue: Auditorio Benito Juárez
- Attendance: ca. 6,000

Event chronology
← Previous; Héroes Inmortales IV	Next → Rey de Reyes

Guerra de Titanes chronology
← Previous; 2009	Next → 2011

Guerra de Titanes (2010) ("War of the Titans") was professional wrestling major show event produced by AAA, which took place on December 5, 2010, in the Auditorio Benito Juárez in Zapopan, Jalisco, Mexico. The event was the fourteenth Guerra de Titanes show promoted by AAA since 1997 and was headlined by a match for the AAA Mega Championship between champion Dr. Wagner Jr. and challenger El Zorro. The main event of the evening saw Los Perros del Mal handing Los Psycho Circus their first ever loss, ending their three-year-long undefeated streak.

== Production ==
=== Background ===
Starting in 1997 the Mexican professional wrestling, company AAA has held a major wrestling show late in the year, either November or December, called Guerra de Titanes ("War of the Titans"). The show often features championship matches or Lucha de Apuestas or bet matches where the competitors risked their wrestling mask or hair on the outcome of the match. In Lucha Libre the Lucha de Apuetas match is considered more prestigious than a championship match and a lot of the major shows feature one or more Apuesta matches. The Guerra de Titanes show is hosted by a new location each year, emanating from cities such as Madero, Chihuahua, Chihuahua, Mexico City, Guadalajara, Jalisco and more. The 2010 Guerra de Titanes show was the thirteenth show in the series.

=== Storylines ===
The Guerra de Titanes show featured eight professional wrestling matches with different wrestlers involved in pre-existing, scripted feuds, plots, and storylines. Wrestlers were portrayed as either heels (referred to as rudos in Mexico, those that portray the "bad guys") or faces (técnicos in Mexico, the "good guy" characters) as they followed a series of tension-building events, which culminated in a wrestling match or series of matches.

== Results ==
No.	Results	Stipulations
1^{D}	Impulso and Lúmino defeated Black Máster and Disturbio Ledesma	Tag team match
2	Gato Eveready, Octagóncito and Pimpinela Escarlata defeated Decnnis, Mini Abismo Negro and Polvo de Estrellas	Six-man tag team match
3	La Milicia (Alan Stone, Chris Stone and Super Fly) defeated Aero Star, El Elegido and Octagón	Six-man tag team street fight
4	Los Maniacos (Silver King and Último Gladiador) (c) defeated La Hermandad 187 (Joe Líder and Nicho el Millonario) and La Legión Extranjera (Hernandez and El Ilegal)	Ladder match for the AAA World Tag Team Championship
5	El Ejército AAA (La Parka, Dark Espíritu, Extreme Tiger and Jack Evans) defeated Los Bizarros (Cibernético, Escoria, Nygma and Taboo)	Eight-man tag team match
6	L.A. Park (with Hernandez) defeated El Mesías	Singles match
7	El Zorro (with Dorian Roldán) defeated Dr. Wagner Jr. (c) (with Joaquin Roldán)	Singles match for the AAA Mega Championship
8	Los Perros del Mal (Damián 666, Halloween and X-Fly) defeated Los Psycho Circus (Psycho Clown, Monster Clown and Murder Clown)	Steel cage weapons match
(c) / – the champion(s) heading into the match; D / – this was a dark match
