= El Intocable =

Mexican professional wrestler

Personal information
- Born: René Gómez Espinoza; September 9, 1976 (age 49) Mexico City, D. F.

Professional wrestling career
- Ring name(s): El Intocable; Spice Boy Randy; Randy El Stripper; Valentino
- Billed height: 1.80 m (5 ft 11 in)
- Billed weight: 86 kg (190 lb)
- Trained by: Gran Apache; Panchito Villalobos; El Torero; Abismo Negro
- Debut: 1997

René "Ricky" Gómez Espinoza (born September 9, 1976 in Mexico City, D. F.), better known under the ring name El Intocable, is a Mexican professional wrestler, actor, and model, best known for his work in Asistencia Asesoría y Administración (AAA) from 1997 until his departure in 2008. He also played the role of Gaspar on the Mexican telenovela Duelo de Pasiones.

== Professional wrestling career ==
Early in his career he was trained by the head trainers of Asistencia Asesoría y Administración (AAA); Gran Apache, Panchito Villalobos, El Torero and Abismo Negro. He debuted in 1997 under the name Valentino and quickly became a heartthrob técnico (wrestler who portrays the "good guys").

=== Spice Boy Randy (1999–2000) ===
In 1999, AAA owner Antonio Peña created the group Los Spice Boys that consisted of Billy Boy, Alan, and Gomez. The group's goal was to have an all-male stripper team that would compete in atomico matches again mainstay rudos like Los Payasos. The group, however, disbanded in 2000 with Billy Boy and Alan forming Los Barrio Boys with fellow AAA worker Decnis.

=== Randy El Stripper (2001–2002) ===
In 2001 Peña repackaged Gomez into a wrestler/stripper named Randy. During this time Gomez had a long feud with El Texano, whose hair he won twice, once in 2002 and another time in 2004.

=== Intocable (2003-present) ===
In 2003 Pena finally found a heartthrob role that could be possible with Gomez and repackaged him as El Intocable (English for "The Untouchable"). In 2005 he teamed up with then AAA tecnicos El Zorro and Electroshock to feud with AAA rudos Juventud Guerrera, Mr. Aguila, and Charly Manson (also known as Xteam). Later on that year during a match between him and Mr. Aguila (which also included Alan Stone, Antifaz del Norte, Psicosis, and Charly Manson), Manson distracted Intocable during the match and Psicosis nailed Gomez in the back which caused Gomez to have a broken neck that had to be surgically repaired, he was out of action for a total of nine and a half months. In late 2005, after returning from injury Intocable began a long feud with Alan Stone who was acting like his rudo-double. Alan claimed that Intocable stole his look and that he wanted it back. At Rey de Reyes, Alan and Intocable had a two out three falls match that went to a no contest after fellow Guapos V.I.P. member Shocker interfered in the match. A couple of months later at Triplemanía XIV, Gomez, El Ángel, Octagón, and Vampiro defeated Stone, Scorpio, Jr, Shocker, and Zumbido. In September of that same year at Verano de Escalando, Gomez, Zorro, Brazo de Plata, and El Oriental lost to Stone, Hator, Scorpio, Jr, and Zumbido. To end the year off at Guerra de Titanes (2006), Gomez and Brazo de Plata lost to Stone and Scorpio Jr. Plata lost his hair after the match because he was the last wrestler to touch all six turnbuckles.

During a match in 2007, Gomez teamed up with Super Fly, Xtreme Tiger, and El Alebrije against Los Guapos V.I.P. he was targeted by all Guapos members which caused them to lose the match after they argued on who would face Intocable, this caused Super Caló and Stone to be beaten by Scorpio Jr and Zumbido. During the beatdown on Los Bellos Stones Intocable came back to the ring after hesitation and stopped Scorpio and Zumbido from doing anymore damage to Stone. Caló tried helping Stone back on his feet only to get kicked by Intocable. He then carried a bloody Stone back to the locker room thus causing and Stone to become technicos. After Guapos VIP brought in Decnis, Intocable joined Los Bellos Stone and feuded with Guapos VIP for the rest of the year that ended at Guerra de Titanes (2007) after Los Bellos Stones defeated Guapos VIP in a Steel Cage Match Luchas de Apuestas with Scorpio getting his head shaved after being the last man to escape the cage. After Caló and a lot more luchadors departed from AAA Intocable was teamed up with Stone, Plata, and El Elegido in the group Idolos de AAA who were a bunch of luchadores fighting for the pride of AAA from Konnan and La Legión Extranjera. During the feud he competed in two Domo De La Muerte matches, surviving both of them without having his hair cut off. In late 2008, after 11 years in the company he departed from AAA on good terms with the company to pursue other careers. in 2017 he announced that he would participate in the 30 man Ruleta Rusa at Triplemanía XXV.

== Television career ==
Gomez played the role of "Gaspar" on the Mexican telenovela Duelo de Pasiones broadcast from April 17, 2006 to October 27, 2006 on Televisa.

== Luchas de Apuestas record ==
Winner (wager)	Loser (wager)	Location	Event	Date	Notes
Randy (hair)	El Texano (hair)	Torreón, Coahuila	Live event	April 19, 2002	(Note: El Texano] was injured so his son Kempo Kid wrestled in his place. Texano had his hair shaved off as a result of the match.)
El Intocable (mask)	El Texano (hair)	Orizaba, Veracruz	Live event	May 15, 2004	(Note: Steel cage match that also included Heavy Metal and La Fiera.)
El Intocable (mask)	Super Kendo (hair)	Tijuana, Baja California	Live event	October 22, 2004	(Note: Super Kendo originally won by cheating but the local wrestling commissioner reversed the decision.)
El Intocable (mask)	Golden Boy (hair)	Monterrey, Nuevo Leon	Live event	May 1, 2007	
El Intocable (mask)	Super Caló (hair)	Tultitlán, State of Mexico	Live event	September 2, 2008	(Note: Steel cage match that also included El Fantasma, Hijo del Anibal, Mascara Ano 2000, Jr., El Solar, Dr. Wagner, Jr., Zumbido, Lizmark Jr. and Toscano)
El Intocable (mask)	Zumbido (hair)	N/A	Live event	October 2008	(Note: Ruleta en Jaula cage match.)
El Intocable (mask)	Zumbido (hair)	San Juan Pantitlan	Live event	March 20, 2009	
