= Guerra de Titanes (2012) =

2012 Lucha Libre AAA World Wide event

- Promotional poster featuring Chessman, El Hijo del Perro Aguayo, Dr. Wagner Jr., Cibernético, L.A. Park and Vampiro
- Promotion: AAA
- Date: December 2, 2012
- City: Zapopan, Jalisco
- Venue: Auditorio Benito Juárez
- Attendance: 7,500

Event chronology
← Previous; Héroes Inmortales	Next → Rey de Reyes

Guerra de Titanes chronology
← Previous; 2011	Next → 2013

Guerra de Titanes (Spanish for "War of the Titans") was a professional wrestling event produced by the AAA promotion, which took place on December 2, 2012, at Auditorio Benito Juárez in Zapopan, Jalisco. The event was the sixteenth Guerra de Titanes end of the year show promoted by AAA since 1997.

== Production ==
=== Background ===
Starting in 1997 the Mexican professional wrestling, company AAA has held a major wrestling show late in the year, either November or December, called Guerra de Titanes ("War of the Titans"). The show often features championship matches or Lucha de Apuestas or bet matches where the competitors risked their wrestling mask or hair on the outcome of the match. In Lucha Libre the Lucha de Apuestas match is considered more prestigious than a championship match and a lot of the major shows feature one or more Apuesta matches. The Guerra de Titanes show is hosted by a new location each year, emanating from cities such as Madero, Chihuahua, Chihuahua, Mexico City, Guadalajara, Jalisco and more. The 2012 Guerra de Titanes show was the fifteenth show in the series.

=== Storylines ===
The Guerra de Titanes show featured six professional wrestling matches with different wrestlers involved in pre-existing, scripted feuds, plots, and storylines. Wrestlers were portrayed as either heels (referred to as rudos in Mexico, those that portray the "bad guys") or faces (técnicos in Mexico, the "good guy" characters) as they followed a series of tension-building events, which culminated in a wrestling match or series of matches.

== Results ==
No.	Results	Stipulations
1	Dark Cuervo, Faby Apache, Mascarita Dorada and Pimpinela Escarlata defeated Halloween, Mari Apache, Mini Charly Manson and Yuriko	Eight-person tag team match
2	Daga defeated Juventud Guerrera (c), Fénix, Jack Evans, Joe Líder and Psicosis	Six-way ladder match for the AAA Cruiserweight Championship
3	La Parka, Octagón and Octagón Jr. defeated La Sociedad (La Parka Negra, Pentagón Jr. and Silver King)	Six-man tag team match
4	Los Psycho Circus (Monster Clown, Murder Clown and Psycho Clown) (with Mini Clown) defeated Los Inferno Rockers (Devil Rocker, Machine Rocker and Soul Rocker)	Six-man tag team match
5	El Texano Jr. (with Silver King) defeated El Mesías (c) (with Octagón Jr.)	Singles match for the AAA Mega Championship
6	Chessman defeated Vampiro; Other participants: Cibernético, Dr. Wagner Jr., L.A. Park, and El Hijo del Perro Aguayo	Six-way elimination Masks vs. Hairs Lucha de Apuestas steel cage match
(c) / – the champion(s) heading into the match
