= Billy Boy (wrestler) =

Mexican professional wrestler (born 1977)

Personal information
- Born: José Roberto Islas García; June 9, 1977 (age 49) Tetitlán, Guerrero, Mexico

Professional wrestling career
- Ring name(s): Alfa; Billy Boy; Billy el Malo; Fighterman; Luigi Boy; Spice Boy Billy
- Billed height: 1.68 m (5 ft 6 in)
- Billed weight: 74 kg (163 lb)
- Trained by: Skayde; Gran Apache
- Debut: July 1997

José Roberto Islas García (born June 9, 1977) is a Mexican professional wrestler, better known by his ring name Billy Boy. Billy Boy has worked for the majority of his career in the Mexican promotion Asistencia Asesoría y Administración, where he most notably teamed with Alan and Decnnis to form Los Barrio Boys and works under the ring name Billy el Malo ("Billy the Evil One") as a member of Los Bizarros. Since 2004 he has been involved in a long-running storyline feud that revolves around his relationship with Faby Apache, his real-life wife, as well as his father-in-law, Gran Apache, and involved Billy Boy and Faby Apache's son Marvin.

== Professional wrestling career ==
Islas began his professional wrestling career in 1997 under the ring name "Fighterman", a stripper character aimed primarily at female fans. Later, his ring name was changed briefly to Luigi Boy, then to just Billy as he was teamed up with Jimmy Boy and Vangelis to form a boy band inspired group called Los Spice Boys. At Triplemanía VII Jimmy Boy, Billy, and Vangelis defeated Los Payasos (Coco Amarillo, Coco Rojo, and Coco Verde) in one of the undercard matches. At the 2000 Guerra de Titanes event Los Spice Boys lost to Los Vatos Locos (Espiritu, Nygma, Picudo and Silver Cat).

=== Los Barrio Boys ===
In 2001 his gimmick was modified to Billy Boy and he was made part of a group called Los Barrio Boys along with Alan (formerly known as "Spice Boy" Jimmy Boy) and Decnnis. The team worked extensive storyline feuds with Los Diabólicos (Ángel Mortal, Mr. Condór, and Marabunta), and were also part of a storyline with AAA trainer Gran Apache, to help the young team improve their in-ring skills. On September 16, 2001, Los Barrio Boys made their first major show appearance as they wrestled the team of Milano Collection AT, Oyanagai Nitohei, and an unknown partner to a draw at Verano de Escándalos. A few months later Los Barrio Boys teamed with Ice Cream to defeat Los Diabolicos and Police Man in the opening match of Guerra de Titanes. On December 12, 2002, Los Barrio Boys teamed up with Oscar Sevilla to defeat Los Vatos Locos to win the Mexican National Atómicos Championship. The team had one successful title defense, defeating Hator, Monje Negro Jr., El Potro, and Ben Hur on April 6, 2003. On July 18, the team lost the Atómicos title back to Los Vatos Locos but would regain them under a month later when they defeated Los Vatos Locos on August 8. Sevilla and Los Barrio Boys successfully defended the Atómicos title against Los Exoticos (Pimpinela Escarlata, May Flowers, Polvo de Estrellas, and Sexy Francis) on October 26. Their second, and final run with the Mexican National Atómicos title ended on August 20, 2004, when they were defeated by The Black Family (Chessman, Ozz, Cuervo, and Escoria), ending their combined reigns at 606 days in total. On December 5, 2004, Los Barrio Boys won a four-way match against The Black Family, Los Kumbria Kids and Los Espantapajaros at Guerra de Titanes.

=== Alfa ===
In 2004 AAA owner Antonio Peña decided to "repackage" Billy Boy, giving him a full-body suit and a mask, turning him into the enmascarado (masked) character "Alfa". Billy Boy's run as Alfa was short-lived and it was not publicly acknowledged at the time that it was Billy Boy under the mask. When he returned to being Billy Boy, he began the storyline that more than any other storyline would define his professional wrestling career. He began showing up ringside during female wrestler Faby Apache's matches with flowers and signs professing his love. The two had dated for years and had recently married when the storyline began, so their real-life relationship was written into the storyline. The storyline friction began when Faby Apache's father, Gran Apache, objected to the relationship and attacked Billy Boy and claiming he was not "worthy" of his daughter. The storyline played out over several years and even had the birth of Billy Boy and Faby's son Marvin written into the storyline. Billy Boy and Gran Apache have met in Lucha de Apuesta matches twice; both times Billy Boy lost the match and was shaved bald afterwards. At one point Gran Apache defeated Billy Boy, forcing him to not have anything to do with either Faby Apache or his son Marvin. Following the loss the storyline was that Billy Boy was so depressed that he caused Los Barrio Boys to lose several matches, this in turn led to Alan and Decnnis turning on Billy Boy and siding with Gran Apache in the storyline. Not long after he was betrayed by the other Barrio Boys, the storyline evolved as Billy Boy was committed to a mental institution.

=== Feud with Faby Apache ===
When he returned to AAA he returned as Alfa, wearing a mask and keeping his true identity secret. As Alfa he gained Gran Apache's respect, leading Apache to stating that Alfa would make a good husband for Faby Apache. Following the statement Billy Boy unmasked to the surprise of everyone, reuniting with Faby Apache and Marvin, though the ruse did not please Gran Apache. During AAA's 2008 Guerra de Titanes show Billy Boy came to Faby Apache's aid after she lost a match, this in turn led to Faby Apache slapping Billy Boy, causing Billy Boy to attack her, turning Rudo (bad guy) for the first time in his career. During an in-ring celebration of Gran Apache's 50 years in professional wrestling Billy Boy attacked his father-in-law with a steel chair, injuring Apache's knee so he had to be taken from the ring on a stretcher. This turn of events was written into the storyline due to Gran Apache actually suffering a knee injury and this was used as a way to explain why he was not able to wrestle. In early 2009 Aero Star was written into the storyline as a new love interest for Faby Apache, Initially Billy Boy acted like he did not care as he himself had found a new love in Sexy Star. During a television taping on March 21, Aero Star came to the ring and asked Gran Apache's permission to ask Faby Apache out, which led to Billy Boy storming to the ring and attacking Aero Star. The storyline evolved and saw all four involved in an intergender Lucha de Apueta Steel Cage Match where the last person in the ring would either have their hair shaved off or be forced to unmask. The match came down to Faby Apache and Billy Boy in the cage with Faby Apache pinning Billy. Following the Apuesta loss the storyline has focused more on Faby Apache and Sexy Star than Billy Boy.

=== Billy el Malo ===
After Billy Boy's storyline with Sexy Star and Faby Apache had concluded, he spent the following months wrestling random undercard matches. In July 2010 Billy Boy joined forces with Decnnis, Alan Stone, Black Abyss, Chris Stone, Psicosis III, and Tigre Cota to form La Milicia, with Decnnis positioned as the leader of the group. La Milicia then merged with La Legión Extranjera and Los Perros del Mal to form La Sociedad, AAA's newest top rudo alliance. On March 13, 2011, Billy Boy revealed himself as the mole within La Sociedad, who had secretly been working for Cibernético since October 2010, and jumped to his tweener group Los Bizarros, adopting the new ring name of "Billy el Malo" ("Billy the Evil One") in the process. In his first match as a member of Los Bizarros, Billy pinned AAA World Tag Team Champion Último Gladiador in a six-man tag team match between Los Bizarros and La Sociedad. In August 2012, Los Bizarros merged with La Secta to form La Secta Bizarra Cibernetica. In March 2013, Islas was sidelined from in-ring action, when his right hand was severely injured during a carjacking. AAA put together a benefit show for June 8 to help Islas with his medical bills. Billy el Malo returned to AAA television in mid-July, when he quit La Secta Bizarra Cibernetica and announced that he was bringing in a wrestler to take on Fénix.

== Championships and accomplishments ==
- Asistencia Asesoría y Administración
  - Mexican National Atómicos Championship (2 times) – with Oscar Sevilla, Decnnis, and Alan

== Luchas de Apuestas record ==
Winner (wager)	Loser (wager)	Location	Event	Date	Notes
Spice Boy Billy (hair)	Ángel Mortal (hair)	Querétaro, Querétaro	Live event	April 27, 2001	
Billy Boy (hair)	Kumo (mask)	N/A	Live event	N/A	
Billy Boy (hair)	Indio Chamula (hair)	N/A	Live event	N/A	
Escoria (hair)	Billy Boy (hair)	Monterrey, Nuevo León	Live event	October 17, 2004	(Note: This was a steel Cage match that also included Ozz, Cuervo, Decnnis and Alan.)
Gran Apache (hair)	Billy Boy (hair)	Guadalajara, Jalisco	Live event	April 30, 2006	
Gran Apache (hair)	Billy Boy (hair)	Mexico City	Rey de Reyes	March 18, 2007	
Faby Apache (hair)	Billy Boy (hair)	Ciudad Madero, Tamaulipas	Verano de Escándalo	August 21, 2009	(Note: This was a steel Cage match that also involved Aero Star and Sexy Star)
Aero Star (hair)	Billy Boy (hair)	Guadalajara, Jalisco	FMLL Live event	December 13, 2009	(Note: This was a four-way match that also included Estrellita and Sexy Star.)
