= Dark Ozz =

Mexican luchador (born 1975)

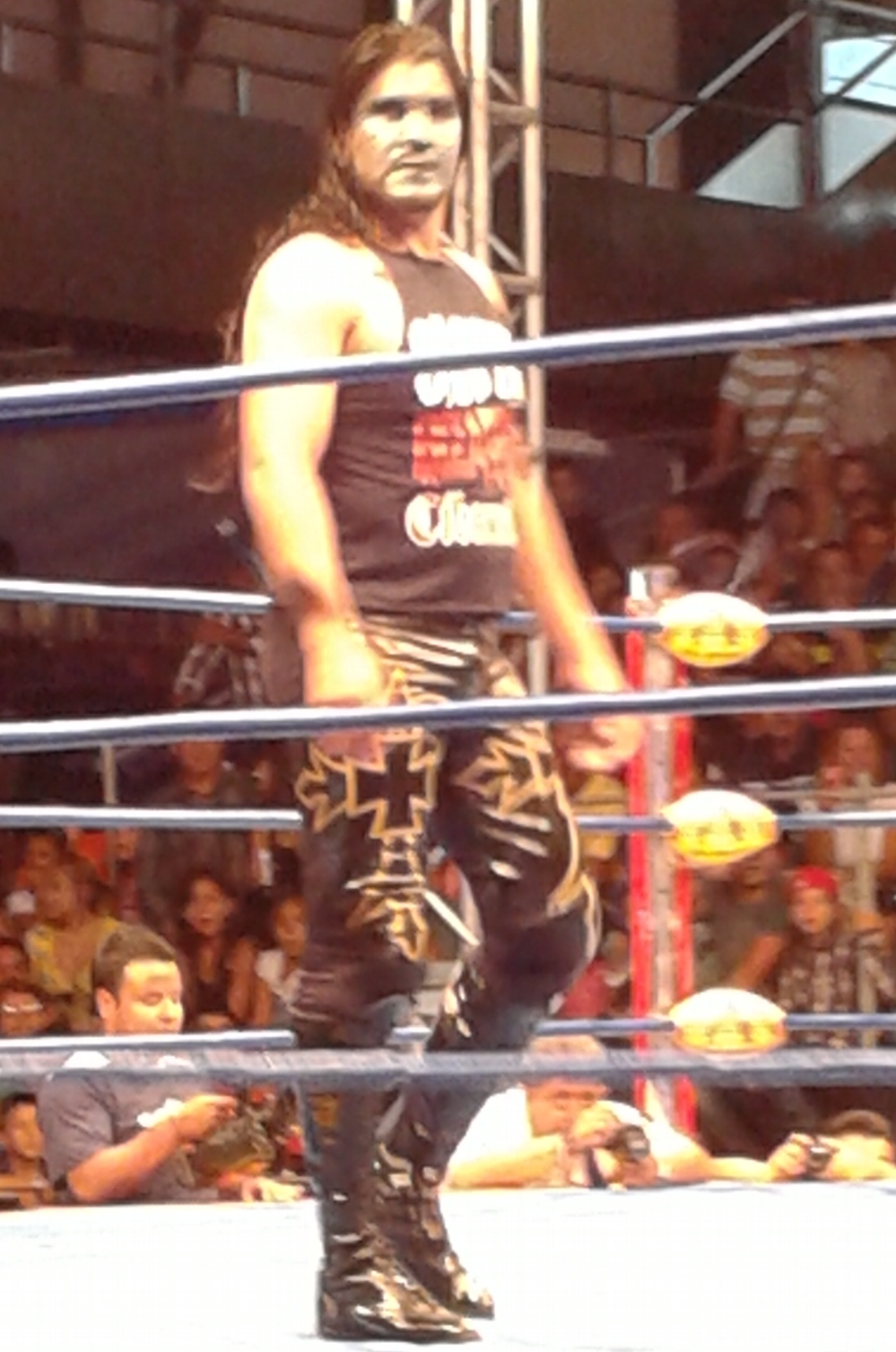
- Ozz in August 2012

Personal information
- Born: Marcos Tinajero; January 30, 1975 (age 51) Uruapan, Michoacán, Mexico

Professional wrestling career
- Ring name(s): Angel Del Misterio; Dark Ozz; Ozz; Path Finder; Rey Dragón
- Billed height: 1.80 m (5 ft 11 in)
- Billed weight: 98 kg (216 lb)
- Trained by: Skayde
- Debut: 1996

Marcos Tinajero (born January 30, 1975) is a Mexican professional wrestler, who is known under the names Ozz / Dark Ozz, a face character (referred to as a Técnico in Mexican wrestling) that works for Lucha Libre Elite. Best known for his work in Lucha Libre AAA Worldwide (AAA), he has been part of The Black Family since it was formed. During his time in the Black Family, Ozz has been a member of Lucha Libre Latina (LLL) and La Secta del Mesías, its predecessor La Secta Cibernetica and La Legión Extranjera but now the Black Family is its own independent entity.

== Professional wrestling career ==
=== Lucha Libre AAA Worldwide ===
After training under one of Mexico's most prolific wrestling trainers, Jorge "Skayde" Rivera, Marcos Tinajero made his debut in 1996. He started out working under several colorful masks with the Face ("good guy", referred to as a técnico) gimmicks of "Angel Del Misterio" (Spanish for "Angel of Mystery") and Rey Dragón (Spanish for "King Dragon"). In 1999 Tinajero would come up with the gimmick that first got him noticed by the promoters and pushed up the rankings, Path Finder. As Path Finder he teamed with El Alebrije, El Felino and Oscar Sevilla losing to Abismo Negro, Electroshock, Pentagón II and Gran Apache at Verano de Escandalo (1999). He would also unsuccessfully compete in the 2000 Rey de Reyes tournament where he lost in the qualifying round to Charly Manson. Later that year he was one of the AAA' luchadors chosen to tour Japan and teamed with Perro Aguayo, Jr. and El Alebrije to defeat the teams of Los Vatos Locos (Picudo, Charly Manson and Espiritu), Team Japan (Naomichi Marufuji, Minoru Tanaka and Genki Horiguchi) and Los Vipers (Histeria, Psicosis II and Maniaco) in one of the feature bouts at Triplemanía VIII. His last major appearance as Path Finder came on September 29, 2000 when he teamed with Oscar Sevilla, Ludxor and Pegasso to defeat Gran Apache and Los Diablicos (Mr. Condor, Marabunta and Angel Mortal) in an Eight Person "Atómicos" tag team match at Verano de Escandalo (2000).

==== The Black Family ====
In the early parts of 2001 Tinajero made a radical change both to his appearance, his gimmick and his alignment as a wrestler. Gone was the masked, high flying, fan friendly Path Finder, instead he was reinvented as the face paint wearing, dark, Goth looking villain called Ozz. He teamed with four other wrestlers that either had or adopted similar gimmicks, looks and attitudes to form the stable the Black Family. The other wrestlers were Charly Manson, Escoria and Cuervo. Early on in the stable's lifetime Charly Manson suffered a grave injury after falling from a ladder during a match which put Manson out of wrestling for a long period. The Black Family brought in Chessman to be the fourth member. Around the time of Chessman joining the Black Family became part of Lucha Libre Latina (LLL), the Mexican version of the New World Order, a group led by Chessman's long-time friend Cibernético. Even though they were part of a much larger group the four men still worked as a unit, a stable within the stable.

The Black Family made their first major show appearance at Verano de Escandalo (2001) where they lost an elimination match to Los Vatos Locos (Espiritu, Nygma, Silver Cat and Picudo), also in the match were Los Vipers (Psicosis II, Histeria, Maniaco and Mosco de la Merced) and Los Exoticos. the team did not make another major show appearance until a year later when they unsuccessfully challenged Los Vatos Locos for the Mexican National Atómicos Championship at Verano de Escandalo (2002). that challenge was the first of many as the Black Family began chasing the Atómicos title and feuding with Los Vatos Locos. when Los Vatos Locos lost the titles to someone else in late 2002 the Black Family started to target the new champions Oscar Sevilla and Los Barrio Boys (Alan, Billy Boy and Decnis). When Charly Manson returned to action he sided with Los Vipers instead of the Black Family leading to a match at Guerra de Titanes 2002 where the Black Family defeated Manson, Histeria, Mosco de la Merced, and Psicosis II. On July 18, 2003 the Black Family won their first championship as a unit when they defeated Oscar Sevilla and Los Barrio Boys for the Atómicos title, but their run only lasted 31 days before Sevilla and Los Barrio Boys regained the titles. It would be just over a year before the Black Family got another opportunity to hold the titles as they won them on August 20, 2004.

==== La Secta ====
In 2005 Cibernético formed a new group called La Secta Cibernetica that included his friends Charly Manson and Chessman and through Chessman's membership the Black Family was also invited to join this new supergroup. The group assisted Cibernético in his fight with La Parka (the AAA version), being unable to prevent him from being unmasked at Triplemanía XII. Later in the year Muerta Cibernetica was brought in to get revenge on La Parka. When Cibernético suffered a severe knee injury Muerta Cibernetica took over the group and kicked Cibernético out. Muerta Cibernetica was himself unmasked by La Parka two years after Cibernético was unmasked. After holding the Atómicos titles for 789 days the Black Family lost to the Mexican Powers (Crazy Boy, Juventud Guerrera, Joe Lider and Psicosis II) on October 18, 2006. Not long after they lost the tag team titles Chessman turned "Technicó" and sided with Cibernético and Charly Manson to form "Los Hell Brothers" fighting against La Secta, now known as "La Secta del Mesias" as Muerta Cibernetica changed his name to "EL Mesias". With Chessman out of the Black Family the team invited Espiritu to leave Los Vatos Locos and join them, the invitation was accepted without any friction from the rest of Los Vatos Locos. During 2006 La Secta del Mesias became part of the super group of "Rudós" known as La Legión Extranjera making the Black Family a sub-group of a sub-group. Sometime in 2006 all four members of the Black Family changed their names slightly adding the word "Dark" in front of their names, thus Ozz became 'Dark Ozz although the names are use interchangeably.

In early 2007 Ozz teamed with Cuervo to compete in a 16 team tournament to crown the first ever AAA World Tag Team Champions. in the end four teams met in the finals at the Rey de Reyes 2007 event. Dark Ozz and Dark Cuervo defeated The Mexican Powers (Crazy Boy and Joe Lider), Los Guapos (Alan Stone and Zumbido) and Real Fuerza Aérea AAA (Pegasso and Super Fly) in an elimination match to win the titles. Ozz became a double champion when the Black Family won the Atómicos titles from the Mexican Powers on May 20, 2007. The dual title situation only lasted until Triplemanía XV where the Mexican Powers team of Crazy Boy and Joe Lider won the Tag Team Championship.

==== End of La Secta ====
In early 2008 El Mesias and the rest of La Secta was kicked out of La Legión Extranjera with La Legión putting El Mesias out of commission for a while. When El Mesias returned to active competition tension began to build between the Black Family and El Mesias. The tensions culminated after El Mesias lost a Steel Cage "Street Fight" Match to Vampiro at Verano de Escandalo (2008) which led to the Black Family attacking El Mesias officially severing their relationship. After breaking up La Secta del Mesias, Dark Ozz assumed leadership of the group as they began to feud with El Mesias. During the fall and winter of 2008 both Charly Manson and Chessman made hints at them possibly returning to the Black Family but Manson got injured and taken off TV while Chessman turned on the group after feinting friendship. On January 9, 2009 Chessman teamed with the Psycho Circus (Killer Clown, Psycho Clown and Zombie Clown) to end the Black Family's Atómicos title run. In November and December 2010 Ozz and Cuervo took part in All Japan Pro Wrestling's World's Strongest Tag Determination League. The duo managed to win four out of their eight matches in the tournament and finished fifth out of nine teams in the final standings.

==== El Inframundo ====
In May 2011, Ozz, Cuervo and Espíritu joined La Parka and Drago to form technico group El Inframundo ("The Underworld") and battle Cibernético's Los Bizarros, which also included their former stable mate Escoria. Ozz and Cuervo returned to All Japan Pro Wrestling in September 2011 and, after Ozz pinned World Tag Team Champion KENSO in a six-man tag team match, were named the number one contenders to KENSO's and The Great Muta's title. On October 9 at Héroes Inmortales, La Parka turned rudo and jumped to Los Perros del Mal. On October 23, Ozz and Cuervo defeated Muta and KENSO to win the World Tag Team Championship. Ozz and Cuervo returned to AAA on December 16 at Guerra de Titanes, along with Vampiro, who replaced La Parka as the leader of El Inframundo. After returning to Japan, Ozz and Cuervo lost the World Tag Team Championship to Manabu Soya and Takao Omori in their fourth title defense on March 20, 2012.

==== La Secta Bizarra Cibernetica ====
On August 18, 2012, the former members of La Secta came together with former leader Cibernético's stable Los Bizarros to form La Secta Bizarra Cibernetica. On August 2, 2013, the entire La Secta turned on Cibernético, forming a new rudo version of the stable. In November, Ozz, along with Cuervo, returned to All Japan to take part in the 2013 World's Strongest Tag Determination League, where they finished with a record of two wins and five losses, failing to advance from their block.

=== Lucha Libre Elite ===
On November 4, 2016, Ozz, along with Espíritu, made his debut for Lucha Libre Elite with the two aligning themselves with Cibernético.

== Championships and accomplishments ==
- All Japan Pro Wrestling
  - World Tag Team Championship (1 time) – with Dark Cuervo
- Lucha Libre AAA Worldwide
  - AAA World Tag Team Championship (1 time) – with Dark Cuervo
  - Mexican National Atómicos Championship (3 times) – with Escoria, Cuervo and Chessman (2), Dark Escoria, Dark Cuervo and Dark Espiritu (1)
- Pro Wrestling Illustrated
  - PWI ranked him #254 of the 500 best singles wrestlers of the PWI 500 in 2007

== Luchas de Apuestas record ==
Winner (wager)	Loser (wager)	Location	Event	Date	Notes
Rey Dragón (hair)	Mosco de la Merced (hair)	Tulancingo, Hidalgo	Live event	January 31, 1999	(Note: Lucha del Reves hair vs. hair between masked wrestlers.)
Mr. Águila (hair)	Dark Ozz (hair)	Zamora, Michoacán	Promotora Zamorana show	October 19, 2019	
