= Máscara Divina =

Mexican professional wrestler

Personal information
- Born: 26 August 1972 (age 53)

Professional wrestling career
- Ring names: El Alberije (II); Máscara Divina; Máscara Sagrada; Super AAA; Super Mascara Sagrada; Televisa Deportes; Triple A
- Trained by: El Huichol
- Debut: 1993

Máscara Divina (Spanish: Divine Mask; born 26 August 1972), is the ring name of a Mexican professional wrestler. He is best known for appearing in the Asistencia Asesoría y Administración (AAA), one of two largest wrestling promotion in Mexico.

Mascara Divina has worked under various ring names such as Máscara Sagrada, Super Mascara Sagrada, Televisa Deportes, Triple A, Super AAA, and El Alberije. He is a former co-holder of the AAA Mascot Tag Team Championship along with Mascarita Sagrada 2000 and the Mexican National Tag Team Championship with La Parka Jr. Máscara Divina's real name is not a matter of public record, as is often the case with masked wrestlers in Mexico where their private lives are kept a secret from wrestling fans.

== Championships and accomplishments ==
- Lucha Libre AAA Worldwide
  - AAA Mascot Tag Team Championship (1 time) – with Mascarita Sagrada 2000
  - Mexican National Tag Team Championship (1 time) with La Parka Jr. (1)
