= Escoria =

Mexican wrestler (born 1980)

Personal information
- Born: José Ibarra; August 13, 1980 (age 46) Durango, Durango, Mexico

Professional wrestling career
- Ring name(s): Escoria; Dark Escoria; Dark Scoria
- Trained by: Blackman; Negro Sosa; Draco
- Debut: August 13, 1998

José Ibarra is a Mexican professional wrestler, who is best known as Escoria / Dark Escoria (Spanish for "Dreg"), a face character that works for Lucha Libre AAA Worldwide (AAA). Ibarra has been part of The Black Family since it was formed, but left the stable in October 2010. During his time in the Black Family, Escoria was also a member of Lucha Libre Latina (LLL) and La Secta del Mesias, its predecessor La Secta Cibernetica and La Legión Extranjera.

== Professional wrestling career ==
Ibarra made his professional wrestling debut in 1998 after training with Blackman, Negro Sosa and Draco for over six months. It was not until 2000 where Ibarra adopted his Escoria (sometimes referred to as "Scoria") that he was successful in the ring.

=== The Black Family ===
In the early parts of 2001 Escoria teamed up with four other wrestlers that all used a similar gimmick, look and attitude as Cuervo to form the stable the Black Family. The other wrestlers were Charly Manson, Cuervo and Ozz. Early on in the stable's lifetime Charly Manson suffered a grave injury after falling from a ladder during a match which put Manson out of wrestling for a long period. The Black Family brought in Chessman to be the fourth member. Around the time of Chessman joining the Black Family became part of Lucha Libre Latina (LLL), the Mexican version of the New World Order, a group led by Chessman's long-time friend Cibernético. Even though they were part of a much larger group the four men still worked as a unit, a stable within the stable.

On July 18, 2003 the Black Family won their first championship as a unit when they defeated Oscar Sevilla and Los Barrio Boys for the Atómicos title, but their run only lasted 31 days before Sevilla and Los Barrio Boys regained the titles. It would be just over a year before the Black Family got another opportunity to hold the titles as they won them on August 20, 2004.

=== Lucha Libre AAA Worldwide (2005-2018) ===
==== La Secta (2005-2009) ====
In 2005 Cibernético formed a new group called La Secta Cibernetica that included his friends Charly Manson and Chessman and through Chessman's membership the Black Family was also invited to join this new supergroup. The group assisted Cibernético in his fight with La Parka (the AAA version), being unable to prevent him from being unmasked at Triplemanía XII. Later in the year Muerta Cibernetica was brought in to get revenge on La Parka. When Cibernético suffered a severe knee injury Muerta Cibernetica took over the group and kicked Cibernético out. After holding the Atómicos titles for 789 days the Black Family lost to the Mexican Powers (Crazy Boy, Juventud Guerrera, Joe Lider and Psicosis II) on October 18, 2006. Not long after they lost the tag team titles Chessman turned "Tecnicó" and sided with Cibernético and Charly Manson to form "Los Hell Brothers" fighting against La Secta, now known as "La Secta del Mesias" as Muerta Cibernetica changed his name to "EL Mesias". With Chessman out of the Black Family the team invited Espiritu to leave Los Vatos Locos and join them, the invitation was accepted without any friction from the rest of Los Vatos Locos. Sometime in 2006 all four members of the Black Family changed their names slightly adding the word "Dark" in front of their names, thus Escoria became 'Dark Escoria although the names are used interchangeably.

In early 2008 El Mesias and the rest of La Secta was kicked out of La Legión Extranjera with La Legión putting El Mesias out of commission for a while. When El Mesias returned to active competition tension began to build between the Black Family and El Mesias. The tensions culminated after El Mesias lost a Steel Cage "Street Fight" Match to Vampiro at Verano de Escandalo (2008) which led to the Black Family attacking El Mesias officially severing their relationship. After breaking up La Secta del Mesias the group began to feud with El Mesias. During the fall and winter of 2008 both Charly Manson and Chessman made hints at them possibly returning to the Black Family but Manson got injured and taken off TV while Chessman turned on the group after feinting friendship. On January 9, 2009 Chessman teamed with the Psycho Circus (Killer Clown, Psycho Clown and Zombie Clown) to end the Black Family's Atómicos title run.

==== Los Bizarros (2010-2013) ====
On October 20, 2010, Escoria officially left the Black Family to join Cibernético and Taboo in the new incarnation of the Los Bizarros stable. On October 31 the three were joined by Amadeus and Nygma. On November 22 Los Bizarros solidified their statuses as tweeners by attacking not only rudo stable La Sociedad, but also technico La Parka. On December 5, 2010, at Guerra de Titanes Charly Manson was revealed as the newest member of Los Bizarros, as he made a surprise jump from Consejo Mundial de Lucha Libre (CMLL) back to AAA. Los Bizarros' lineup was completed on March 13, 2011, when La Sociedad member Billy Boy revealed himself as Cibernético's mole and jumped to Los Bizarros, renaming himself Billy el Malo in the process.

==== Return of La Secta (2013-2014) ====
On August 2, 2013, Escoria, Dark Cuervo, Dark Espiritu and Dark Ozz all turned on Cibernético, forming a new rudo version of La Secta.

==== Los Xinetez and Dark Family (2016-2017) ====
On January 22, 2016, at Guerra de Titanes, Scoria, Cuervo and El Zorro won the vacant AAA World Trios Championship. They lost the title to OGT (Averno, Chessman and Ricky Marvin) on November 4.

On March 31, 2017, Scoria and Cuervo won the AAA World Tag Team Championship. They held the title for two months, losing it to El Mesias and Pagano, but won it back a week later at Verano de Escándalo (2017), in a match that also featured the teams of Aerostar & Drago and Australian Suicide and Bengala.

== Championships and accomplishments ==
- Lucha Libre AAA Worldwide
  - AAA World Tag Team Championship (3 times) – with Cuervo
  - AAA World Trios Championship (1 time) – with Dark Cuervo and El Zorro
  - Mexican National Atómicos Championship (3 times) - with Cuervo, Ozz and Chessman (2), Dark Cuervo, Dark Ozz and Dark Espiritu (1)
- Kaoz Lucha Libre
  - Kaoz Tag Team Championship (1 time) – (with Cuervo)

== Luchas de Apuestas record ==
Winner (wager)	Loser (wager)	Location	Event	Date	Notes
Escoria (hair)	Billy Boy (hair)	Monterrey, Nuevo León]	Live event	October 17, 2004	(Note: Steel cage match that also included Ozz, Cuervo, Decnnis and Alan.)
Escoria (hair)	Ultrataro (hair)	Unknown	Live event	August 13, 2006	(Note: Ultrataro, Dizzy and Super Caló vs. Escoria, Cuervo and Ozz.)
Angélico (hair) and Jack Evans (hair)	Dark Escoria (hair) and Dark Cuervo (hair)	Monterrey, Nuevo León	Verano de Escándalo	June 14, 2015	(Note: Steel cage match.)
