= Gran Apache =

Mexican professional wrestler (1959–2017)

Personal information
- Born: Mario Balbuena González; April 16, 1959 Mexico City, Mexico
- Died: May 7, 2017 (aged 58) Mexico City, Mexico
- Cause of death: Intestinal cancer
- Spouse: Lady Apache (divorced)
- Children: Faby Apache (daughter); Mari Apache (daughter)
- Relatives: Billy Boy (ex-son-in-law); Natsumi (granddaughter); Marvin Apache (grandson)

Professional wrestling career
- Ring name(s): Chiva Rayada I Cometa Azul III; El Apache; Gran Apache; Great Sasuke Tiga Power Version; Jabagengi; Kimba; Lion
- Billed height: 168 cm (5 ft 6 in)
- Billed weight: 86 kg (190 lb)
- Trained by: Rafael Salamanca; Tony Lopez; Blue Demon; Cometa Azules I Cometa Azules II
- Debut: August 8, 1975

Mario Balbuena González (April 16, 1959 – May 7, 2017), better known under the ring names Gran Apache and El Apache, was a Mexican professional wrestler and trainer. Balbuena worked for AAA / Lucha Libre AAA Worldwide (AAA) since 1996, both as a wrestler and a trainer. He was involved in training almost all young wrestlers who worked for the promotion during that period of time.

Two of Balbuena's four daughters—Faby Apache and Mari Apache—followed him into a professional wrestling career. His second wife also became a professional wrestler under the name Lady Apache. Balbuena and his family were part of a long-running "Telenovela" style storyline that also included Faby Apache's then-husband Billy Boy as well as their son, referred to as "Marvin Apache". As Gran Apache, Balbuena held the AAA World Mixed Tag Team Championship twice and the AAA World Trios Championship once with his daughters. In 2018 he was inducted in the AAA Hall of Fame.

== Early life ==
Mario Balbuena González was born on April 19, 1959, in Mexico City, Mexico. Growing up, Balbuena was interested both in sports and music, so much so that by the age of 14 he was already part of a Salsa band and was hoping to make that his career.

== Professional wrestling career ==
In January 1975 Balbuena met professional wrestlers Cometa Azules I and II who invited the athletic Balbuena to come train with them. Initially, he had no specific interest in lucha libre, but as soon as he started to train he was hooked by the physicality of the sport. Balbuena trained with Los Cometas Azlues for eight months before making his in-ring debut in August 1975. For his first match he worked as the enmascarado, or masked character, Cometa Azules III, using the name as an homage to his teachers. Following the match, Santo, one of the biggest stars of professional wrestling in Mexico, greeted Balbuena, who was so fascinated by the culture and respect shown backstage that he decided to become a full-time wrestler.

Following his decision to pursue a full-time career, he trained at Blue Demon's gym to further his skills. During his training Balbuena's long hair and Native American features led to him being referred to as "El Apache" by everyone in the gym, a name he would adopt as his ring name. In later interviews Balbuena stressed that he was not a "Cowboys and Indians" stereotypical Apache, but a "Mexican Apache", related to the Apache nation that lived in Chihuahua, Sonora, Arizona, New Mexico and Texas. During his training Balbuena showed such aptitude for wrestling that he was made an instructor's assistant. In 1984 one of Balbuena and one of his students, Luis García Vergara, were trained as a team by Empresa Mexicana de Lucha Libre, with the idea that they would work as a pair of masked Native American characters known as Pluma Blanca (white feather) and Pluma Amarilla (yellow feather). The duo got a better offer from the promoters at the Pavillón Azteca, where they became known as Gran Apache I (Balbuena) and Gran Apache II (García).

Los Gran Apaches won the Pavillón Azteca Tag Team Championship, sometimes referred to as the AWWA Tag Team Championship. Their most notable achievement, however, was a long running storyline feud with a team known as Los Mohicanos, a rivalry noted for the violent matches that included the use of various foreign objects and often left one or more of the participants covered in blood. In 1987 Los Gran Apaches' added Lady Apache as their valet; Lady Apache was Balbuena's second wife and had been trained by him for her professional wrestling career. In 1989 Pavillón Azteca closed down and both Balbuena and García went their separate ways with Balbuena keeping the Gran Apache name.

In 1992 Balbuena began working for Empresa Mexicana de Lucha Libre (EMLL, later known as Consejo Mundial de Lucha Libre; CMLL). In EMLL Balbuena formed a group known as Rudos del Ritmo (bad guys with rhythm) alongside several CMLL wrestlers such as Ari Romero, Kung Fu, Búfalo Salvaje, América, Halcón Negro, Mario Prado and Estrellita.

=== Japan ===
In 1994 Balbuena, dissatisfied with the opportunities EMLL was giving him, left the promotion to work for Carlos Máynes' promotion. While the promotion was past its heyday in Mexico, Máynes' connections allowed Balbuena to start working in Japan for the International Wrestling Association of Japan (IWA Japan). While in Japan he resumed working as a trainer outside of the ring and wrestling against his trainees on shows to help teach them how to actually work matches. During his time in Japan, he began training his two oldest daughters, Mariella and Fabiola for their wrestling careers. While in Japan Balbuena portrayed various masked characters such as Jabagengi, with a mask like a monkey, and Lion, a wrestling lion, before leaving Japan in 1995. Balbuena returned to Japan in 2000 for a short stint to work for CMLL Japan, using the masked character "Kimba". Starting in 2001 Balbuena, as Gran Apache, returned to Japan, working for Michinoku Pro off and on for several years both wrestling and training Japanese wrestlers.

=== AAA / Lucha Libre AAA Worldwide (1995–2017) ===
In 1995 Balbuena joined Lucha Libre AAA Worldwide as both a wrestler and a trainer, later becoming the head trainer for AAA. In AAA he reunited with his former Los Gran Apaches partner, with the two adopting the masked comedy gimmick Las Chivas Rayadas, two "wrestling soccer goats" inspired by the Club Deportivo Guadalajara mascot. The masked gimmick allowed the veteran wrestlers to train younger wrestlers by working against them and even allowed various trainees to work as "Chiva Rayada III".

==== Apache family feud (2005–2009) ====
Starting in 2005 Balbuena and his family became the focal point of a storyline that would come to define their careers more than any other. In real life Balbuena's daughter Fabiola, now working as "Faby Apache", had married José Roberto Islas García, better known as professional wrestler Billy Boy. The storyline AAA presented depicted Gran Apache as the "overprotective father" who did not think that Billy Boy was good enough for her daughter. The storyline, sometimes described as a Telenovela, began when Billy Boy began showing up ringside during Faby's matches with flowers and signs professing his love for her. Gran Apache objected to the relationship and attacked Billy Boy as he was not "worthy" of his daughter. The storyline played out over several years and even had the birth of Billy Boy and Faby's son Marvin written into the storyline. At one point Gran Apache defeated Billy Boy, forcing him to not have anything to do with either Faby Apache or his son Marvin. Following the loss the storyline was that Billy Boy was so depressed that he was committed to a mental institution.

Billy Boy later returned as the masked "Alfa", a trainee of Gran Apache, who earned the respect of the harsh father who declared that "Alfa" was worthy of his daughter. Following the statement Billy Boy unmasked to the surprise of everyone, reuniting with Faby Apache and Marvin, though the ruse did not please Gran Apache. During AAA's 2008 Guerra de Titanes show Billy Boy came to Faby Apache's aid after she lost a match, this, in turn, led to Faby Apache slapping Billy Boy, causing Billy Boy to attack her, turning rudo. During an in-ring celebration of Gran Apache's 50 years in professional wrestling, Billy Boy attacked his father-in-law with a steel chair, injuring Apache's knee so he had to be taken from the ring on a stretcher. This turn of events was written into the storyline due to Gran Apache actually suffering a knee injury, and this was used as a way to explain why he was not able to wrestle. The storyline later ended when Faby Apache defeated Billy Boy in a Steel Cage match at the 2009 Verano de Escándalo show.

==== Later years (2010–2017) ====
After the Apache family feud ended Gran Apache focused primarily on working with younger luchadors, teaching them how to plan out matches and work in front of live audiences by wrestling against them on AAA shows. In 2016 his daughters Faby and Mari became involved in a feud with a group of males known as Los OGT (Averno, Chessman and Ricky Marvin), initially siding with the men, claiming that "men were superior wrestlers". At Triplemanía XXIV Faby and Mari wrestled against Averno and Chessman in a match where Gran Apache served as the guest referee. During the match Gran Apache became concerned over the violence that Averno and Chessman displayed, protecting them as they were about to be hit with a fluorescent lighttube, reuniting with his daughters after the match. At Héroes Inmortales X Los OGT defeated the Apaches. In the spring of 2017 Los Apaches were scheduled to face Los OGT for the AAA World Trios Championship, but Mari had suffered a serious injury and Gran Apache was unable to compete; at the time they did not explain the health issues he was dealing with. Instead of the trios match Faby Apache wrestled against Ricky Marvin, defeating him to win the AAA World Trios Championship on behalf of her family. Neither Mari nor Gran Apache ever appeared in AAA to defend the championship. On April 21 Faby, teaming with Psycho Clown and Dr. Wagner Jr., lost the championship to El Poder del Norte (Carta Brava Jr., Mocho Cota Jr. and Soul Rocker).

== Wrestling trainer ==
Having worked as the AAA head trainer for over a decade and as a trainer off and on since the mid-1980s, Balbuena had a hand in training almost every young wrestler that worked for AAA during the period of time, as well as many non-AAA wrestlers who attended his wrestling school. He was often cited as one of the best trainers of female wrestlers, starting in the mid-1980s where very few trainers would even consider working with women.

== Personal life and death ==
Balbuena had four daughters and was married at least twice. Balbuena and his first wife were the parents of Mariella Balbuena Torres (Mari Apache) born in 1979 and Fabiola Balbuena Torres (Faby Apache) born in 1980 and a third daughter before divorcing. In 1986 Balbuena married Sandra González Calderón (Lady Apache), and together the couple had one daughter before divorcing later on.

Balbuena was diagnosed with intestinal cancer in either late 2016 or early 2017, causing his health to rapidly deteriorate. On May 7, 2017, he died from the cancer. Following his death many luchadors all over Mexico commented on the loss of a great teacher and a great friend.

== Championships and accomplishments ==
- AAA / Lucha Libre AAA Worldwide
  - AAA World Mixed Tag Team Championship (2 times) – with Faby Apache (1) and Mari Apache (1)
  - AAA World Trios Championship (1 time) – with Faby and Mari Apache
  - AAA Hall of Fame (Class of 2018)
- Pavillón Azteca
  - Pavillón Azteca Tag Team Championship (1 time) – with Gran Apache II
- Pro Wrestling Illustrated
  - PWI ranked him #229 of the top 500 singles wrestlers in the PWI 500 in 2002

== Luchas de Apuestas record ==
Winner (wager)	Loser (wager)	Location	Event	Date	Notes
Gran Apache (hair)	Perro Salvaje (hair)	Mexico City, Mexico	Live event	May 1, 1983	
Gran Apache (hair)	Escudero Rojo Pista (hair)	Mexico City, Mexico	Live event	December 2, 1990	
Rocco Valente (hair)	Gran Apache (hair)	Mexico City, Mexico	Live event	January 14, 1992	
Gran Apache (hair)	Loco Valentino (hair)	León, Guanajuato	Live event	April 5, 1992	
Gran Apache (hair)	Rey David (hair)	Mexico City, Mexico	Live event	November 15, 1992	
Gran Apache (hair)	Reyes Veloz (hair)	Mexico City, Mexico	Live event	November 21, 1992	
Gran Apache and El Mestizo (hair)	Escudero Rojo and Reyes Veloz (hair)	Mexico City, Mexico	Live event	September 7, 1993	
Gran Apache (hair)	Cuerno de Chivo (hair)	Monterrey, Nuevo León	Live event	October 17, 1999	(Note: Cage match with Apache, Panthro, Oscar Sevilla and Cuerno. Both tecnicos escaped so Apache fouled Cuerno and left the cage.)
Chiva Rayada I (mask) (Note: It is uncertain if it was Balbueno under the mask or not.)	Gladiador Fantasma (mask)	San Juan Pantitlan	Live event	February 27, 2000	
Óscar Sevilla (hair)	Gran Apache (hair)	Ciudad Madero, Tamaulipas	Live event	March 31, 2000	
Mosco de la Merced (hair)	Gran Apache (hair)	León, Guanajuato	Live event	July 15, 2002	(Note: Steel cage match)
Gran Apache (hair)	Billy Boy (hair)	Guadalajara, Jalisco	Live event	April 30, 2006	
Gran Apache (hair)	Mohicano I (hair)	Pachuca, Hidalgo	Live event	October 26, 2006	
Gran Apache (hair)	Billy Boy (hair)	Naucalpan, State of Mexico	Rey de Reyes	March 18, 2007	
