= Rey de Reyes (2004) =

2004 Lucha Libre AAA World Wide event

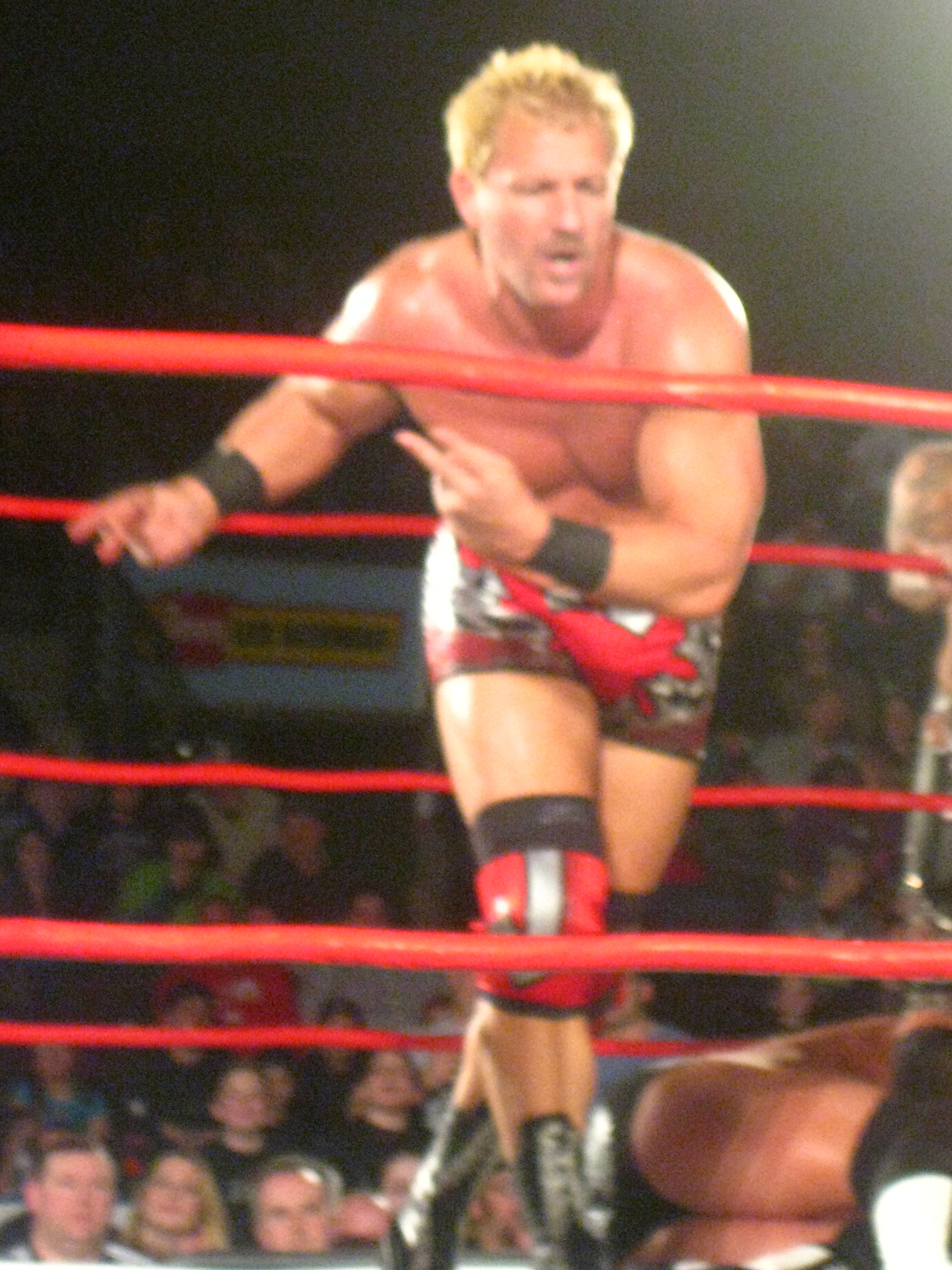
- Jeff Jarrett, the 2004 Rey de Reyes
- Promotion: AAA
- Date: March 21, 2004
- City: Naucalpan, Mexico State, Mexico
- Venue: Toreo de Cuatro Caminos
- Attendance: 18,000

Event chronology
← Previous; Guerra de Titanes	Next → Triplemanía XII

Rey de Reyes chronology
← Previous; 2003	Next → 2005

The Rey de Reyes 2004 (Spanish for "King of Kings") was the eighth annual Rey de Reyes professional wrestling tournament and show, produced by the Mexican wrestling promotion AAA. The event took place on March 5, 2004, in the Toreo de Cuatro Caminos arena in Naucalpan, Mexico State, Mexico. The main focus of the 2004 Rey de Reyes show was the eighth annual Rey de Reyes tournament which this year was reduced to a single match between an AAA representative, (Latin Lover) and a representative from AAA's North American working partner Total Nonstop Action Wrestling, (Jeff Jarrett – NWA World Heavyweight Champion at the time). The undercard saw a Parejas Suicida between the teams of Chessman and Tiffany and the husband and wife team of Electroshock and Lady Apache, where the losing team would have to face each other with their hair on the line. The twist in this Parejas Suicida was it was an Intergender tag team match which forced a man to wrestle a woman in the ensuing match. Also featured on the card was a 3-way tag team match for an opportunity at the AAA Mascot Tag Team Championship (where the team is a Regular sized competitor teaming with a "mini" wrestler). The three teams vying for that opportunity were Abismo Negro and Mini Abismo Negro, El Alebrije and Cuije and the team of the Monsther and Chucky. They would face the reigning Mascot champions, Máscara Ságrada and Mascarita Sagrada, the same night.

== Production ==
=== Background ===
Starting in 1997 and every year since then the Mexican Lucha Libre, or professional wrestling, company AAA has held a Rey de Reyes (Spanish for "King of Kings') show in the spring. The 1997 version was held in February, while all subsequent Rey de Reyes shows were held in March. As part of their annual Rey de Reyes event AAA holds the eponymious Rey de Reyes tournament to determine that specific year's Rey. Most years the show hosts both the qualifying round and the final match, but on occasion the qualifying matches have been held prior to the event as part of AAA's weekly television shows. The traditional format consists of four preliminary rounds, each a Four-man elimination match with each of the four winners face off in the tournament finals, again under elimination rules. There have been years where AAA has employed a different format to determine a winner. The winner of the Rey de Reyes tournament is given a large ornamental sword to symbolize their victory, but is normally not guaranteed any other rewards for winning the tournament, although some years becoming the Rey de Reyes has earned the winner a match for the AAA Mega Championship. From 1999 through 2009 AAA also held an annual Reina de Reinas ("Queen of Queens") tournament, but later turned that into an actual championship that could be defended at any point during the year, abandoning the annual tournament concept. The 2004 show was the eight Rey de Reyes show in the series.

=== Storylines ===
The Rey de Reyes show featured seven professional wrestling matches with different wrestlers involved in pre-existing, scripted feuds, plots, and storylines. Wrestlers were portrayed as either heels (referred to as rudos in Mexico, those that portray the "bad guys") or faces (técnicos in Mexico, the "good guy" characters) as they followed a series of tension-building events, which culminated in a wrestling match or series of matches.

== Results ==
No.	Results	Stipulations
1	El Intocable, El Oriental and El Brazo defeated Pirata Morgan, El Texano and La Fiera	Six-man "Lucha Libre rules" tag team match
2	Abismo Negro and Mini Abismo Negro defeated El Alebrije and Cuije, and the Monsther and Chucky	Triangle Tag team match to earn a match for the AAA Mascot Tag Team Championship
3	Mascara Ságrada and Mascarita Sagrada (c) defeated Abismo Negro and Mini Abismo Negro	Tag team match for the AAA Mascot Tag Team Championship
4	Cibernético, Juventud Guerrera, Charly Manson and Mr. Águila defeated Gronda, El Zorro, Octagón, and Heavy Metal by disqualification	Eight-man "Atómicos" tag team match
5	Chessman and Tiffany defeated Electroshock and Lady Apache	Pareja Suicidas tag team match
6	Electroshock defeated Lady Apache	Luchas de Apuestas which meant Lady Apache was supposed to have her hair shaved off but Electroshock sacrificed his hair instead
7	Jeff Jarrett defeated Latin Lover	Singles match 2004 Rey de Reyes tournament final
(c) / – the champion(s) heading into the match
