= Rey de Reyes (2022) =

Mexican professional wrestling show

- Promotional poster featuring various AAA luchadores and luchadoras
- Promotion: Lucha Libre AAA Worldwide
- Date: February 19, 2022
- City: Veracruz, Veracruz, Mexico
- Venue: Estadio Universitario Beto Ávila
- Tagline(s): Lucha Libre AAA Worldwide Gira Aniversario XXX (Spanish for: Lucha Libre AAA Worldwide 30th Anniversary Tour)

Event chronology
← Previous; Triplemanía Regia II	Next → AAA Invades WrestleCon

Rey de Reyes chronology
← Previous; 2021	Next → 2023

The 2022 Rey de Reyes (Spanish for "2022 King of Kings") was a professional wrestling tournament and supercard event produced by the Mexican Lucha Libre AAA Worldwide (AAA) promotion. It was held on February 19, 2022, at Estadio Universitario Beto Ávila in Veracruz, Veracruz, Mexico. The 2022 event was the 25th Rey de Reyes show and tournament.

The card comprised eight matches, including one dark match. In the main event, Hijo del Vikingo defeated Johnny Superstar (who previously appeared in AAA as Johnny Mundo) to retain the AAA Mega Championship. In other prominent matches, Psycho Clown become the 2022 Rey de Reyes by defeating Cibernético, Laredo Kid, Bandido, and the returning Heavy Metal in a five-way match, and the returning Taya defeated Lady Shani, Flammer Maravilla, and Keyra in a five-way match-way to become the #1 contender for Deonna Purrazzo's Reina de Reinas Championship.

== Production ==
=== Background ===
Since 1997 and every year except 2020, the Mexican Lucha Libre, or professional wrestling, company AAA has held a Rey de Reyes (Spanish for "King of Kings") show in the spring. The 1997 version was held in February, while all subsequent Rey de Reyes shows were held in March. As part of their annual Rey de Reyes event AAA holds the eponymous Rey de Reyes tournament to determine that specific year's Rey. Most years the show hosts both the qualifying round and the final match, but on occasion the qualifying matches have been held prior to the event as part of AAA's weekly television shows. The traditional format consists of four preliminary rounds, each a Four-man elimination match with each of the four winners face off in the tournament finals, again under elimination rules. There have been years where AAA has employed a different format to determine a winner. The winner of the Rey de Reyes tournament is given a large ornamental sword to symbolize their victory, but is normally not guaranteed any other rewards for winning the tournament, although some years becoming the Rey de Reyes has earned the winner a match for the AAA Mega Championship. From 1999 through 2009 AAA also held an annual Reina de Reinas ("Queen of Queens") tournament, but later turned that into an actual championship that could be defended at any point during the year, abandoning the annual tournament concept. The 2022 show will be the 25th Rey de Reyes show in the series.

=== Storylines ===
Rey de Reyes featured eight professional wrestling matches that involved wrestlers from scripted feuds. The wrestlers portrayed either heels (referred to as rudos in Mexico, those that play the part of the "bad guys") or faces (técnicos in Mexico, the "good guy" characters) as they performed.

== Results ==
No.	Results	Stipulations	Times
1^{D}	Aracno II defeated Aracno	Singles match This was the Marvel Lucha Libre Edition exhibition match	—
2	Taya defeated Lady Shani, Flammer, Maravilla, and Keyra	Five-way match to determine the #1 contender for the AAA Reina de Reinas Championship	12:20
3	Los Vipers (Abismo Negro Jr., Látigo and Psicosis) defeated Myzteziz Jr., Mr. Iguana, and Niño Hamburguesa	Trios match	10:58
4	Los Vipers (Arez and Chik Tormenta) (c) defeated Octagón Jr. and Sexy Star II, and Los Mercenarios (Villano III Jr. and La Hiedra)	Lumberjacks with Straps three-way mixed tag team match for the AAA World Mixed Tag Team Championship	11:31
5	La Empresa (Puma King, Sam Adonis, and DMT Azul) (with Estrellita and Microman) vs. La Familia Real (L.A. Park, El Hijo de L.A. Park, and L.A. Park Jr.) vs. Nueva Generación Dinamita (El Cuatrero, Sansón, and Forastero) ended in a no contest	Three-way trios match	13:05
6	Psycho Clown defeated Cibernético, Laredo Kid, Bandido, and Heavy Metal	Five-man Rey de Reyes match	10:17
7	Pentagón Jr. defeated Dralístico	Singles match	13:19
8	Hijo del Vikingo (c) (with Lady Shani) defeated Johnny Superstar	Singles match for the AAA Mega Championship	13:07
(c) / – the champion(s) heading into the match; D / – this was a dark match

== Comentaristas ==
- Hugo Savinovich
- José Manuel Guillén
- Carlos Cabrera

== See also ==
- 2022 in professional wrestling
