= Rey de Reyes =

Lucha Libre AAA World Wide event series

- AAA Rey de Reyes logo introduced in 2026
- Promotion: Lucha Libre AAA Worldwide
- First event: 1997
- Event gimmick: Rey de Reyes tournament

Tournament information
- Established: 1997; 29 years ago
- Current winner: El Grande Americano
- Last completed: 2026
- Prize: AAA Mega Championship match
- Editions: 29
- Format: Single-elimination tournament
- Participants: 16
Statistics
- First winner: Latin Lover
- Most wins: La Parka Jr. (5 wins)
- Oldest winner: El Canek (49 years, 271 days)
- Youngest winner: Cibernético (23 years, 329 days)
- Heaviest winner: Electroshock (119 kg (262 lb))
- Lightest winner: Xtreme Tiger (67 kg (148 lb))

Rey de Reyes (Spanish for "King of Kings") is a major annual professional wrestling event in Mexico produced by Mexican professional wrestling promotion Lucha Libre AAA Worldwide, a subsidiary of WWE. The event was established in 1997 and centers around the Rey de Reyes tournament, which is comparable to WWE's King of the Ring tournament. It originally consisted of four-way elimination matches with four qualifiers and a final. The winner is presented with a sword, which some have carried with them for an entire year. In 2026, the Rey de Reyes tournament the winner also receives a future AAA Mega Championship match.

== History ==
The first Rey de Reyes event was held on February 21, 1997, at the Convention Center in Ciudad Madero, Tamaulipas, Mexico. Since then all Rey de Reyes events have been held in March each year. The 13 events have hosted 13 finals, with only one wrestler, La Parka, winning the tournament more than once, in 2001, 2003, 2005, and 2007. Ciudad Madero, Tamaulipas and Naucalpan, Mexico State are tied for most events hosted with five each. Beyond that, only Zapopan, Jalisco has repeated as host of the event. As is tradition with recent major AAA shows, the wrestlers compete inside a hexagonal wrestling ring and not the four sided ring the promotion uses for regular television events and House shows.

As of 2011 Rey de Reyes has seen six Luchas de Apuesta, or bet fights. A wrestler has been unmasked once, and five times a wrestler or wrestlers have had their hair shaved off as a result of losing the Apuesta match. The event has hosted eight championship matches, with four championships changing hands on the show, including the finals of the tournament to crown the first ever AAA World Tag Team Champions.

== List of events ==
| # | Event | Date | Venue | City | Main event | Ref. |
|---|---|---|---|---|---|---|
| 1 | Rey de Reyes (1997) | February 21, 1997 | Convention Center | Ciudad Madero, Tamaulipas, Mexico | Heavy Metal vs. Héctor Garza vs. Latin Lover vs. Octagón in the four-way Rey de Reyes tournament final | |
| 2 | Rey de Reyes (1998) | March 1, 1998 | Toreo de Cuatro Caminos | Naucalpan, State of Mexico, Mexico | Cibernético vs. Latin Lover vs. Octagón vs. Perro Aguayo in the four-way elimination Rey de Reyes tournament final | |
| 3 | Rey de Reyes (1999) | March 7, 1999 | Toreo de Cuatro Caminos | Naucalpan, State of Mexico, Mexico | El Cobarde II vs. Perro Aguayo vs. Sangre Chicana in a three-way Hair vs. Hair Bull Terrier match | |
| 4 | Rey de Reyes (2000) | March 5, 2000 | Toreo de Cuatro Caminos | Naucalpan, State of Mexico, Mexico | Gigante Drako vs. La Parka in a Mask vs. Mask match | |
| 5 | Rey de Reyes (2001) | March 30, 2001 | Convention Center | Ciudad Madero, Tamaulipas, Mexico | Abismo Negro vs. Heavy Metal vs. La Parka Jr. vs. Latin Lover in the four-way elimination Rey de Reyes tournament final | |
| 6 | Rey de Reyes (2002) | March 17, 2002 | Auditorio Benito Juarez | Zapopan, Jalisco, Mexico | Cibernético vs. El Canek vs. Octagón Pirata Morgan in the four-way elimination Rey de Reyes tournament final | |
| 7 | Rey de Reyes (2003) | March 16, 2003 | Auditorio Benito Juarez | Zapopan, Jalisco, Mexico | Abismo Negro vs. La Parka Jr. in the Rey de Reyes tournament final | |
| 8 | Rey de Reyes (2004) | March 21, 2004 | Toreo de Cuatro Caminos | Naucalpan, State of Mexico, Mexico | Jeff Jarrett vs. Latin Lover for the Rey de Reyes trophy | |
| 9 | Rey de Reyes (2005) | March 11, 2005 | Convention Center | Ciudad Madero, Tamaulipas, Mexico | Abismo Negro vs. Chessman vs. Cibernético vs. Jeff Jarrett vs. Konnan vs. La Parka vs. Latin Lover in a seven-man elimination match for the Rey de Reyes trophy | |
| 10 | Rey de Reyes (2006) | March 10, 2006 | Convention Center | Ciudad Madero, Tamaulipas, Mexico | Los Guapos (Scorpio Jr., Shocker, and Zumbido) vs. Team AAA (La Parka, Octagón and Vampiro) defeated La Secta Cibernetica (Chessman, Cibernético, and Muerte Cibernetica) vs. Team TNA (Konnan, Ron Killings, and Samoa Joe) in a three-way trios elimination match for the Rey de Reyes trophy | |
| 11 | Rey de Reyes (2007) | March 18, 2007 | Toreo de Cuatro Caminos | Naucalpan, State of Mexico, United States | Abismo Negro vs. Fuerza Guerrera vs. La Parka vs. Latin Lover vs. Octagón vs. Rhino in a six-man elimination match for the Rey de Reyes trophy | |
| 12 | Rey de Reyes (2008) | March 16, 2008 | Plaza de Toros Lorenzo Garza | Monterrey, Nuevo León. Mexico | El Mesias (c) vs. Cibernético for the AAA Mega Championship | |
| 13 | Rey de Reyes (2009) | March 15, 2009 | Plaza de Toros Nuevo Progreso | Guadalajara, Jalisco, Mexico | El Mesias (c) vs. Chessman for the AAA Mega Championship | |
| 14 | Rey de Reyes (2010) | March 12, 2010 | Palacio de Toros Santa Maria | Querétaro, Querétaro, Mexico | El Mesias (c) vs. Electroshock vs. Mr. Anderson in a three-way match for the AAA Mega Championship | |
| 15 | Rey de Reyes (2011) | March 18, 2011 | Plaza de Toros Monumental | Aguascalientes, Aguascalientes, Mexico | Carlito Caribbean Cool vs. El Mesías vs. Extreme Tiger vs. L.A. Park in a four-way elimination match for the Rey de Reyes trophy | |
| 16 | Rey de Reyes (2012) | March 18, 2012 | Auditorio Benito Juárez | Zapopan, Jalisco, Mexico | Jeff Jarrett (c) vs. El Mesias for the AAA Mega Championship | |
| 17 | Rey de Reyes (2013) | March 17, 2013 | Plaza de Toros Monumental | Monterrey, Nuevo León, Mexico | Canek vs. El Mesías vs. L.A. Park in the three-way elimination Rey de Reyes tournament final | |
| 18 | Rey de Reyes (2014) | March 16, 2014 | Plaza de Toros Monumental | Monterrey, Nuevo León, Mexico | Black Warrior vs. El Hijo del Perro Aguayo vs. El Zorro vs. La Parka in the four-way elimination Rey de Reyes tournament final | |
| 19 | Rey de Reyes (2015) | March 18, 2015 | Auditorio Benito Juarez | Zapopan, Jalisco, Mexico | El Hijo del Perro Aguayo and Pentagón Jr. vs. Myzteziz and Rey Mysterio Jr. | |
| 20 | Rey de Reyes (2016) | March 23, 2016 | Plaza de Toros Monumental El Paseo | San Luis Potosí, San Luis Potosí, Mexico | El Mesias vs. El Texano Jr for the vacant AAA Mega Championship | |
| 21 | Rey de Reyes (2017) | March 19, 2017 | Arena José Sulaimán | Monterrey, Nuevo León, Mexico | Aero Star vs. Super Fly in a two-out-of-three falls Mask vs. Hair match | |
| 22 | Rey de Reyes (2018) | March 4, 2018 | Acrópolis Puebla | Puebla, Puebla, Mexico | El Hijo del Fantasma vs. El Texano Jr. in a Mask vs. Hair match | |
| 23 | Rey de Reyes (2019) | March 16, 2019 | Acrópolis Puebla | Puebla, Puebla, Mexico | Lucha Brothers (Fénix and Pentagón Jr.) (c) vs. The Young Bucks (Matt Jackson and Nick Jackson) for the AAA World Tag Team Championship | |
| 24 | Rey de Reyes (2021) | May 1, 2021 | Unknown | San Pedro Cholula, Puebla, Mexico | Chessman and Sam Adonis vs. Psycho Clown and Pagano | |
| 25 | Rey de Reyes (2022) | February 19, 2022 | Estadio Universitario Beto Ávila | Veracruz, Veracruz, Mexico | Hijo del Vikingo (c) vs. John Hennigan for the AAA Mega Championship | |
| 26 | Rey de Reyes (2023) | February 5, 2023 | Poliforum Zamna | Mérida, Yucatán, Mexico | Bandido vs. Hijo del Vikingo vs. Pagano vs. Sam Adonis in a four-way Rey de Reyes tournament final | |
| 27 | Rey de Reyes (2024) | February 3, 2024 | Base del Ejercito y Fuerza Aerea | Mexico City, Mexico | El Hijo del Vikingo vs. El Texano Jr. vs. Laredo Kid in a three-way Rey de Reyes tournament final | |
| 28 | Rey de Reyes (2025) | March 22, 2025 | Gimnasio Juan de la Barrera | Mexico City, Mexico | Alberto El Patrón (c) vs. El Hijo del Vikingo for the AAA Mega Championship | |
| 29 | Rey de Reyes (2026) | March 14, 2026 (Aired March 14–28) | Auditorio GNP | Puebla, Puebla, Mexico | Week 1 (March 14); Dominik Mysterio (c) vs. El Hijo del Vikingo for the AAA Mega Championship | |
| 29 | Rey de Reyes (2026) | March 14, 2026 (Aired March 14–28) | Auditorio GNP | Puebla, Puebla, Mexico | Week 2 (March 21); Pagano and Psycho Clown (c) vs. The War Raiders (Erik and Ivar) for the AAA World Tag Team Championship | |
| 29 | Rey de Reyes (2026) | March 14, 2026 (Aired March 14–28) | Auditorio GNP | Puebla, Puebla, Mexico | Week 3 (March 28); El Fiscal vs. Abismo Negro Jr. | |

== List of Rey de Reyes tournament winners ==
| # | Year | Winner | Times won | Tournament final | | Ref. |
| # | Year | Winner | Times won | Opponent(s) | Date | Ref. |
|---|---|---|---|---|---|---|
| 1 | 1997 | Latin Lover | 1 | Heavy Metal, Héctor Garza, and Octagón | February 21, 1997 | |
| 2 | 1998 | Octagón | 1 | Cibernético, Latin Lover, and Perro Aguayo | March 1, 1998 | |
| 3 | 1999 | Cibernético | 1 | Electroshock, Latin Lover, and Octagón | March 7, 1999 | |
| 4 | 2000 | Abismo Negro | 1 | Charly Manson, Cibernético, and El Alebrije | March 5, 2000 | |
| 5 | 2001 | La Parka Jr. | 1 | Abismo Negro, Heavy Metal, and Latin Lover | March 30, 2001 | |
| 6 | 2002 | El Canek | 1 | Cibernético, Octagón, and Pirata Morgan | March 17, 2002 | |
| 7 | 2003 | La Parka Jr. | 2 | Abismo Negro | March 16, 2003 | |
| 8 | 2004 | Jeff Jarrett (Note: Jeff Jarrett's Rey de Reyes victory was initially stricken from AAA's records, after the promotion ended their relationship with Total Nonstop Action Wrestling (TNA). His win was eventually recognized again when their relationship resumed in 2010.) | 1 | Latin Lover | March 21, 2004 | |
| 9 | 2005 | La Parka Jr. | 3 | Abismo Negro, Chessman, Cibernético, Jeff Jarrett, Konnan, and Latin Lover | March 11, 2005 | |
| 10 (Note: This was the only edition to feature trios matches.) | 2006 | Vampiro (Note: Vampiro was a member of Team AAA with La Parka and Octagón. Vampiro got the pinfall victory for his team so he was recognized as the Rey de Reyes winner.) | 1 | La Secta Cibernetica (Chessman, Cibernético, and Muerte Cibernetica), Team TNA (Konnan, Ron Killings, and Samoa Joe) and Los Guapos (Scorpio Jr., Shocker, and Zumbido) | March 10, 2006 | |
| 11 | 2007 | La Parka Jr. | 4 | Abismo Negro, Fuerza Guerrera, Latin Lover, Octagón, and Rhino | March 18, 2007 | |
| 12 | 2008 | El Zorro | 1 | Abismo Negro, Alan Stone, and Mr. Niebla | March 16, 2008 | |
| 13 | 2009 | Electroshock | 1 | La Parka, Latin Lover, and Silver King | March 15, 2009 | |
| 14 | 2010 | Chessman | 1 | Hernandez and Marco Corleone | March 12, 2010 | |
| 15 | 2011 | Xtreme Tiger | 1 | Carlito Caribbean Cool, El Mesías, and L.A. Park | March 18, 2011 | |
| 16 | 2012 | El Hijo del Perro Aguayo | 1 | Héctor Garza, Jack Evans, and L.A. Park | March 18, 2012 | |
| 17 | 2013 | El Mesías | 1 | Canek and L.A. Park | March 17, 2013 | |
| 18 | 2014 | La Parka Jr. | 5 | Black Warrior, El Hijo del Perro Aguayo, and El Zorro | March 16, 2014 | |
| 19 | 2015 | El Texano Jr. | 1 | Aero Star, El Mesías, and Psycho Clown | March 18, 2015 | |
| 20 | 2016 | Pentagón Jr. | 1 | La Parka and Villano IV | March 23, 2016 | |
| 21 | 2017 | Argenis | 1 | Averno, Bengala, Chessman, El Elegido, Joe Líder, Niño Hamburguesa, La Parka, and Pimpinela Escarlata | March 19, 2017 | |
| 22 | 2018 | Rey Escorpión | 1 | Bengala, El Hijo del Vikingo, and La Parka | March 4, 2018 | |
| 23 | 2019 | Aero Star | 1 | Australian Suicide, El Hijo del Vikingo, Golden Magic, Jack Evans, Laredo Kid, Myzteziz Jr., Sammy Guevara, and Taurus | March 16, 2019 | |
| 24 | 2021 | Laredo Kid | 1 | Abismo Negro Jr., Aero Star, Drago, El Hijo del Vikingo, El Texano Jr., Murder Clown, and Myzteziz Jr. | May 1, 2021 | |
| 25 | 2022 | Psycho Clown | 1 | Bandido, Cibernético, Heavy Metal, and Laredo Kid | February 19, 2022 | |
| 26 | 2023 | Sam Adonis | 1 | Bandido, El Hijo del Vikingo, and Pagano | February 5, 2023 | |
| 27 | 2024 | El Hijo del Vikingo | 1 | El Texano Jr. and Laredo Kid | February 3, 2024 | |
| 28 | 2025 | Niño Hamburguesa | 1 | DMT Azul, El Hijo de Dr. Wagner Jr., and El Mesías | March 22, 2025 | |
| 29 | 2026 | El Grande Americano | 1 | La Parka, "The Original" El Grande Americano, and Santos Escobar | March 14, 2026 | |
