= Rey de Reyes (2024) =

2024 Lucha Libre AAA Worldwide Event

- Promotion: Lucha Libre AAA Worldwide
- Date: February 3, 2024
- City: Mexico City, Mexico
- Venue: Base del Ejercito y Fuerza Aerea
- Attendance: 8,400

Event chronology
← Previous; Ultra Clash	Next → Triplemanía XXXII: Monterrey

Rey de Reyes chronology
← Previous; 2023	Next → 2025

The 2024 Rey de Reyes (Spanish for "2024 King of Kings") was a professional wrestling tournament and supercard event produced by the Mexican Lucha Libre AAA Worldwide (AAA) promotion. The event took place on February 3, 2024, at the Base del Ejercito y Fuerza Aerea in Mexico City, Mexico. The 2024 event was the 27th Rey de Reyes show and tournament.

== Production ==
=== Background ===
Since 1997 and every year except 2020, the Mexican Lucha Libre, or professional wrestling, company AAA has held a Rey de Reyes (Spanish for "King of Kings") show in the spring. The 1997 version was held in February, while all subsequent Rey de Reyes shows were held in March. As part of their annual Rey de Reyes event AAA holds the eponymous Rey de Reyes tournament to determine that specific year's Rey. Most years the show hosts both the qualifying round and the final match, but on occasion the qualifying matches have been held prior to the event as part of AAA's weekly television shows. The traditional format consists of four preliminary rounds, each a Four-man elimination match with each of the four winners face off in the tournament finals, again under elimination rules. There have been years where AAA has employed a different format to determine a winner. The winner of the Rey de Reyes tournament is given a large ornamental sword to symbolize their victory, but is normally not guaranteed any other rewards for winning the tournament, although some years becoming the Rey de Reyes has earned the winner a match for the AAA Mega Championship. From 1999 through 2009 AAA also held an annual Reina de Reinas ("Queen of Queens") tournament, but later turned that into an actual championship that could be defended at any point during the year, abandoning the annual tournament concept. On January 23, 2024, AAA announced that Rey de Reyes would take place on February 3, 2024. The 2024 show will be the 27th Rey de Reyes show in the series.

=== Storylines ===
Rey de Reyes featured eight professional wrestling matches that involved wrestlers from scripted feuds. The wrestlers portrayed either heels (referred to as rudos in Mexico, those that play the part of the "bad guys") or faces (técnicos in Mexico, the "good guy" characters) as they performed.

== Results ==
No.	Results	Stipulations	Times
1	Faby Apache defeated Pimpinela Escarlata and La Hiedra by pinfall	Three-way match This was a Reina de Reinas qualifying match.	8:55
2	Lady Shani defeated Flammer and Sexy Star II by submission	Three-way match This was a Reina de Reinas qualifying match.	12:45
3	Laredo Kid defeated Argenis and Aero Star by pinfall	Three-way match This was a Rey de Reyes qualifying match.	10:32
4	El Texano Jr. defeated Cibernético and Electroshock by pinfall	Three-way match This was a Rey de Reyes qualifying match.	9:32
5	El Hijo del Vikingo defeated Psycho Clown and Sam Adonis by pinfall	Three-way match This was a Rey de Reyes qualifying match.	12:10
6	Lady Shani defeated Faby Apache by pinfall	Reina de Reinas final	8:06
7	Colmillo De Plata, Garra De Oro and Mr. Iguana defeated Bengala, SB Kento and Takuma by pinfall	Six-man tag team match	11:42
8	El Hijo del Vikingo defeated Laredo Kid and El Texano Jr. by pinfall	Three-way Rey de Reyes final	17:25

=== Rey de Reyes tournament bracket ===
1st Round
Aero Star	—
Argenis	10:32
Laredo Kid	Pinfall
Cibernético	9:32
El Texano Jr.	Pinfall
Electroshock	—
El Hijo del Vikingo	Pinfall
Psycho Clown	12:10
Sam Adonis	—

Final
Laredo Kid	—
El Texano Jr.	17:25
El Hijo del Vikingo	Pinfall

=== Reina de Reinas tournament bracket ===
1st Round; Rey de Reyes; February 3, 2024
La Hiedra Pimpinela Escarlata	— 8:55
Faby Apache	Pinfall
Lady Shani	Submission
Flammer Sexy Star	12:45 —

Final; Rey de Reyes; February 3, 2024
Faby Apache	8:06
Lady Shani	Pinfall

== See also ==
- 2024 in professional wrestling
