= Rey de Reyes (2023) =

Mexican professional wrestling show

- Promotional poster featuring various AAA luchadores and luchadoras
- Promotion: Lucha Libre AAA Worldwide
- Date: February 5, 2023
- City: Merida, Yucatan, Mexico
- Venue: Poliforum Zamna

Event chronology
← Previous; Noche de Campeones	Next → Super Series

Rey de Reyes chronology
← Previous; 2022	Next → 2024

The 2023 Rey de Reyes (Spanish for "2023 King of Kings") was a professional wrestling tournament and supercard event produced by the Mexican Lucha Libre AAA Worldwide (AAA) promotion. The event was held on February 5, 2023, at Poliforum Zamna in Merida, Yucatan, Mexico. The 2023 event was the 26th Rey de Reyes show and tournament.

In the main event match, Sam Adonis defeated Bandido, Pagano, and Hijo del Vikingo to become the 2023 Rey de Reyes. In other prominent matches, Sexy Star II defeated Chik Tormenta, Lady Shani, La Hiedra, and Dalys in a five-way match to become the 2023 Reina de Reinas and Negro Casas made his AAA in-ring debut, losing to Hijo del Vikingo in a Rey de Reyes qualifier that also involved Myzteziz Jr. and Mecha Wolf.

== Production ==
=== Background ===
Since 1997 and every year except 2020, the Mexican Lucha Libre, or professional wrestling, company AAA has held a Rey de Reyes (Spanish for "King of Kings") show in the spring. The 1997 version was held in February, while all subsequent Rey de Reyes shows were held in March. As part of their annual Rey de Reyes event AAA holds the eponymous Rey de Reyes tournament to determine that specific year's Rey. Most years the show hosts both the qualifying round and the final match, but on occasion the qualifying matches have been held prior to the event as part of AAA's weekly television shows. The traditional format consists of four preliminary rounds, each a Four-man elimination match with each of the four winners face off in the tournament finals, again under elimination rules. There have been years where AAA has employed a different format to determine a winner. The winner of the Rey de Reyes tournament is given a large ornamental sword to symbolize their victory, but is normally not guaranteed any other rewards for winning the tournament, although some years becoming the Rey de Reyes has earned the winner a match for the AAA Mega Championship. From 1999 through 2009 AAA also held an annual Reina de Reinas ("Queen of Queens") tournament, but later turned that into an actual championship that could be defended at any point during the year, abandoning the annual tournament concept. The 2023 show was the 26th Rey de Reyes show in the series.

=== Storylines ===
Rey de Reyes featured seven professional wrestling matches that involved wrestlers from scripted feuds. The wrestlers portrayed either heels (referred to as rudos in Mexico, those that play the part of the "bad guys") or faces (técnicos in Mexico, the "good guy" characters) as they performed.

== Results ==
No.	Results	Stipulations	Times
1	Takuma Nishikawa, Kuukai, and La Parka Negra defeated Eterno Alcander, Niño Hamburguesa, and Mr. Iguana	Trios match	—
2	Sam Adonis defeated Vampiro, Puma King, and Arez	Four-way match Rey de Reyes match qualifier	8:40
3	Bandido defeated Psycho Clown, Abismo Negro Jr., and Komander	Four-way match Rey de Reyes match qualifier	9:12
4	Pagano defeated Bestia 666, Flamita, and Aramís	Four-way match Rey de Reyes match qualifier	11:49
5	Hijo del Vikingo defeated Mecha Wolf, Myzteziz Jr., and Negro Casas	Four-way match Rey de Reyes match qualifier	14:51
6	Sexy Star II defeated Chik Tormenta, Lady Shani, La Hiedra, and Dalys	Five-woman Reina de Reinas match	—
7	Sam Adonis defeated Bandido, Pagano, and Hijo del Vikingo	Four-man Rey de Reyes match Was held between the winners of the four qualifier matches	12:12

=== Tournament bracket ===
Qualifiers; Rey de Reyes; February 5, 2023
Arez	—
Puma King	—
Sam Adonis	Win
Vampiro	8:40
Abismo Negro Jr.	9:12
Bandido	Win
Komander	—
Psycho Clown	—
Aramís	—
Bestia 666	—
Flamita	11:49
Pagano	Win
Hijo del Vikingo	Win
Mecha Wolf	14:51
Myzteziz Jr.	—
Negro Casas	—

Final; Rey de Reyes; February 5, 2023
Sam Adonis	Win
Bandido	12:12
Pagano	—
Hijo del Vikingo	—

== See also ==
- 2023 in professional wrestling
