= Rey de Reyes (2005) =

2005 Lucha Libre AAA World Wide event

- Official logo of the Rey de Reyes broadcast
- Promotion: AAA
- Date: March 11, 2005
- City: Ciudad Madero, Tamaulipas, Mexico
- Venue: Convention Center

Event chronology
← Previous; Guerra de Titanes	Next → Triplemanía XIII

Rey de Reyes chronology
← Previous; 2004	Next → 2006

The Rey de Reyes 2005 (Spanish for "King of Kings") was the ninth annual Rey de Reyes professional wrestling tournament and show, produced by the Mexican wrestling promotion AAA. The event took place on March 11, 2005 in the Convention Center in Ciudad Madero, Tamaulipas, Mexico. The main focus of the 2005 Rey de Reyes show was the ninth annual Rey de Reyes tournament, which featured an elimination match with six men competing for the Rey de Reyes title. As in the previous year, TNA representatives competed in the finals. The finalists did not have to qualify but were announced in the weeks leading up to the events. The finalists were: La Parka, Latin Lover, Abismo Negro, Chessman, Jeff Jarrett, Konnan and Cibernético. The undercard included a Kick Boxing match between Humberto Galanez Gabuz and Ty Landez. In the semi-main event Octagoncito faced Mini Psicosis in a Lucha de Apuestas where both men put their masks on the line.

== Production ==
=== Background ===
Starting in 1997 and every year since then the Mexican Lucha Libre, or professional wrestling, company AAA has held a Rey de Reyes (Spanish for "King of Kings') show in the spring. The 1997 version was held in February, while all subsequent Rey de Reyes shows were held in March. As part of their annual Rey de Reyes event AAA holds the eponymious Rey de Reyes tournament to determine that specific year's Rey. Most years the show hosts both the qualifying round and the final match, but on occasion the qualifying matches have been held prior to the event as part of AAA's weekly television shows. The traditional format consists of four preliminary rounds, each a Four-man elimination match with each of the four winners face off in the tournament finals, again under elimination rules. There have been years where AAA has employed a different format to determine a winner. The winner of the Rey de Reyes tournament is given a large ornamental sword to symbolize their victory, but is normally not guaranteed any other rewards for winning the tournament, although some years becoming the Rey de Reyes has earned the winner a match for the AAA Mega Championship. From 1999 through 2009 AAA also held an annual Reina de Reinas ("Queen of Queens") tournament, but later turned that into an actual championship that could be defended at any point during the year, abandoning the annual tournament concept. The 2005 show was the ninth Rey de Reyes show in the series.

=== Storylines ===
The Rey de Reyes show featured six professional wrestling matches with different wrestlers involved in pre-existing, scripted feuds, plots, and storylines. Wrestlers were portrayed as either heels (referred to as rudos in Mexico, those that portray the "bad guys") or faces (técnicos in Mexico, the "good guy" characters) as they followed a series of tension-building events, which culminated in a wrestling match or series of matches.

== Results ==
No.	Results	Stipulations
1	Tiffany, La Diabólica and Princesa Sugey vs. Lady Apache, Faby Apache and Princess Blanca ended in a no contest	Six-man "Lucha Libre rules" tag team match
2	Ty Landez defeated Humberto Galanez Gabuz via decision	Special feature Kick Boxing match: Ty Landez won in the third round.
3	El Intocable, El Zorro, and El Hijo de Aníbal defeated Mr. Águila, Hator and Tinieblas Jr.	Six-man "Lucha Libre rules" tag team match
4	El Alebrije, Electroshock and Gronda defeated Charly Manson, El Picudo and The Monsther	Six-man "Lucha Libre rules" tag team match
5	Octagoncito defeated Mini Psicosis	Lucha de Apuesta, mask vs. mask match.
6	La Parka defeated Latin Lover, Abismo Negro, Chessman, Jeff Jarrett, Konnan and Cibernético: Jeff Jarrett and Konnan were disqualified and eliminated; Latin Lover pinned Abismo Negro.; La Parka pinned Cibernético; La Parka Is declared the winner by disqualification when the heels attack him and unmask him	Elimination match: finals of the 2005 Rey de Reyes tournament.
