= Rey de Reyes (2021) =

Mexican professional wrestling show

- Promotional poster featuring various AAA luchadores and luchadoras
- Promotion: Lucha Libre AAA Worldwide
- Date: May 1, 2021
- City: San Pedro Cholula, Puebla, Mexico
- Venue: Unknown
- Attendance: 0 (behind closed doors) (Note: The event was held without an audience due to the COVID-19 pandemic in Mexico.)

Event chronology
← Previous; Triplemanía XXVIII	Next → Verano de Escándalo

Rey de Reyes chronology
← Previous; 2019	Next → 2022

The 2021 Rey de Reyes (Spanish for "2021 King of Kings") was a professional wrestling tournament and supercard event produced by the Mexican Lucha Libre AAA Worldwide (AAA) promotion. It was held on May 1, 2021, in San Pedro Cholula, Puebla, Mexico at an unannounced location. The event was originally scheduled to be held at the Poliforum Zamna in Merida, Yucatan on March 21, 2020. However, on March 13, AAA announced that they were postponing the 2020 Rey de Reyes show due to COVID-19 precautions.

The 2021 event was the 24th Rey de Reyes show and tournament, the first since 2019. In the main event match, Psycho Clown and Pagano wrestled Chessman and the debuting Sam Adonis to a no contest. In other prominent matches, Taurus won a three-way match for the vacant AAA Latin American Championship, Faby Apache won a six-way match for the vacant Reina de Reinas Championship, and Laredo Kid won the 2021 Rey de Reyes tournament.

Impact Knockouts Champion Deonna Purrazzo appeared on commentary during the event and former WWE wrestler Andrade made his AAA debut, challenging Mega Champion Kenny Omega to a match at Triplemanía XXIX.

== Production ==
=== Background ===
From 1997 to 2019, the Mexican Lucha Libre, or professional wrestling, company AAA has held a Rey de Reyes (Spanish for "King of Kings") show in the spring. The 1997 version was held in February, while all subsequent Rey de Reyes shows were held in March. As part of their annual Rey de Reyes event AAA holds the eponymous Rey de Reyes tournament to determine that specific year's Rey. Most years the show hosts both the qualifying round and the final match, but on occasion the qualifying matches have been held prior to the event as part of AAA's weekly television shows. The traditional format consists of four preliminary rounds, each a Four-man elimination match with each of the four winners face off in the tournament finals, again under elimination rules. There have been years where AAA has employed a different format to determine a winner. The winner of the Rey de Reyes tournament is given a large ornamental sword to symbolize their victory, but is normally not guaranteed any other rewards for winning the tournament, although some years becoming the Rey de Reyes has earned the winner a match for the AAA Mega Championship. From 1999 through 2009 AAA also held an annual Reina de Reinas ("Queen of Queens") tournament, but later turned that into an actual championship that could be defended at any point during the year, abandoning the annual tournament concept.

The 2020 event was postponed to 2021 due to the COVID-19 pandemic; the event was the 24th event in the Rey de Reyes chronology.

=== Storylines ===
Rey de Reyes featured five professional wrestling matches that involved wrestlers from scripted feuds. The wrestlers portrayed either heels (referred to as rudos in Mexico, those that play the part of the "bad guys") or faces (técnicos in Mexico, the "good guy" characters) as they performed.

== Results ==
No.	Results	Stipulations	Times
1	Látigo defeated Dinastía, Toxin, Aramís, and Arez	Five-way match Winner will receive a future AAA World Cruiserweight Championship match	12:47
2	Taurus defeated Octagón Jr. and Villano III Jr.	Three-way match for the vacant AAA Latin American Championship	12:16
3	Faby Apache defeated Lady Shani, Lady Flammer, Chik Tormenta, Lady Maravilla, and Sexy Star II	Six-way elimination match for the vacant AAA Reina de Reinas Championship	16:11
4	Laredo Kid defeated El Texano Jr., Aero Star, Drago, Abismo Negro Jr., El Hijo del Vikingo, Myzteziz Jr., and Murder Clown	Eight-man Rey de Reyes match	17:03
5	Psycho Clown and Pagano vs. Chessman and Sam Adonis ended in a no contest	Tag team match	10:13

== See also ==
- 2021 in professional wrestling
