= Triplemanía XIII =

2005 Lucha Libre AAA World Wide event

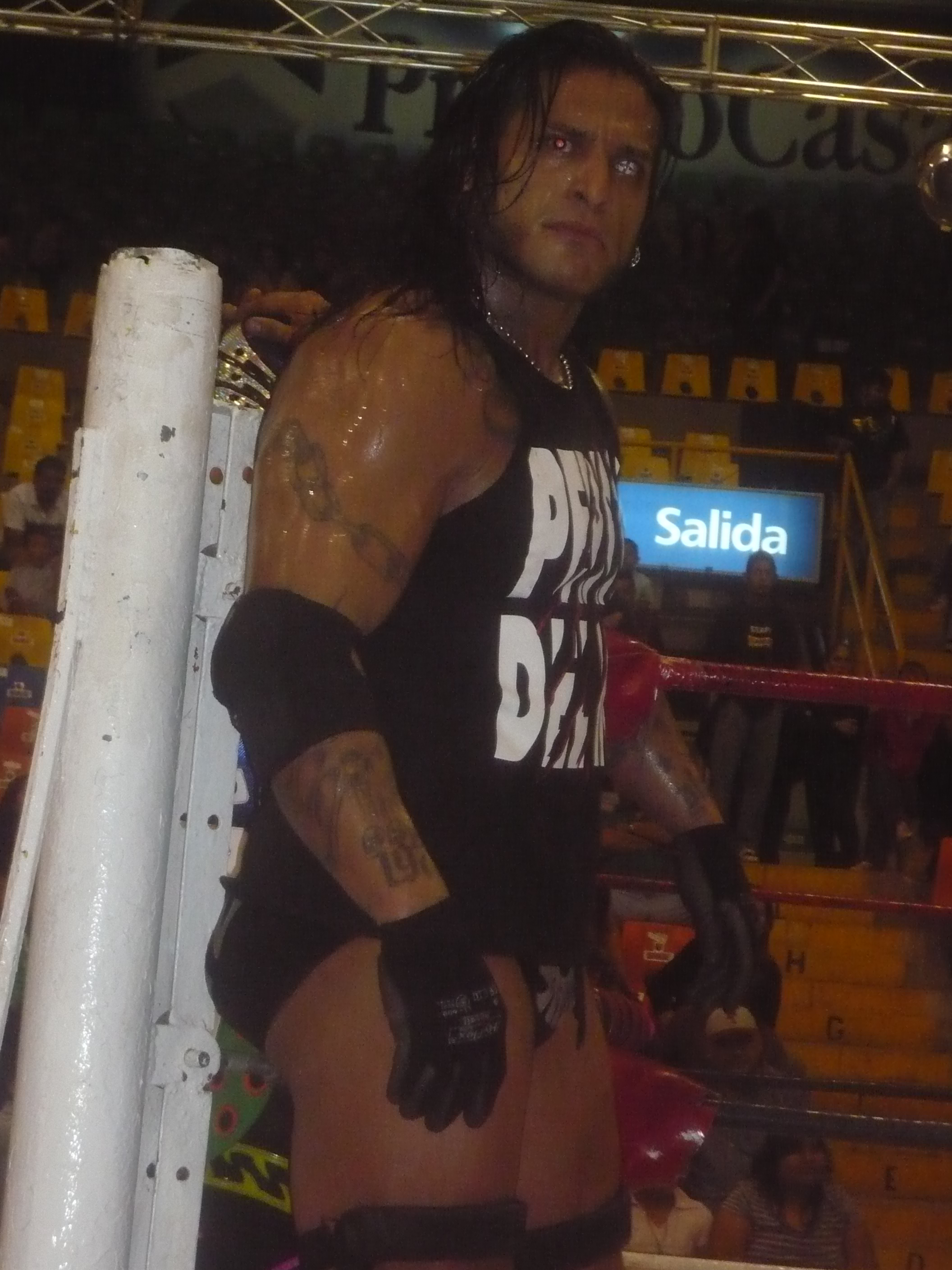
- Cibernético, defeated in the main event of the show.
- Promotion: AAA
- Date: May 15, 2005
- City: Guadalajara, Jalisco, Mexico
- Venue: Plaza de Toros
- Attendance: 22,129

Pay-per-view chronology
← Previous; Rey de Reyes	Next → Verano de Escándalo

Triplemanía chronology
← Previous; XII	Next → XIV

Triplemanía XIII was the thirteenth Triplemanía professional wrestling show promoted by AAA. The show took place on June 20, 2005 in Guadalajara, Jalisco, Mexico. The Main event featured a Six-man "Lucha Libre rules" tag team match between the teams of Latin Lover, La Parka and Octagón and Los Hell Brothers (Chessman and Cibernético) teaming with Fuerza Guerrera.

== Production ==
=== Background ===
In early 1992 Antonio Peña was working as a booker and storyline writer for Consejo Mundial de Lucha Libre (CMLL), Mexico's largest and the world's oldest wrestling promotion, and was frustrated by CMLL's very conservative approach to professional wrestling, specifically the style of wrestling known as Lucha Libre (Spanish for "freestyle wrestling"). He joined forced with a number of younger, very talented wrestlers who felt like CMLL was not giving them the recognition they deserved and decided to split from CMLL to create Asistencia Asesoría y Administración, later known simply as "AAA" or Triple A. After making a deal with the Televisa television network AAA held their first show in April 1992. The following year Peña and AAA held their first Triplemanía event, building it into an annual event that would become AAA's Super Bowl event, similar to the WWE's WrestleMania being the biggest show of the year. The 2005 Triplemanía was the 13th year in a row AAA held a Triplemanía show and the 18th overall show under the Triplemanía banner.

=== Storylines ===
The Triplemanía XIII show featured six professional wrestling matches with different wrestlers involved in pre-existing scripted feuds, plots and storylines. Wrestlers were portrayed as either heels (referred to as rudos in Mexico, those that portray the "bad guys") or faces (técnicos in Mexico, the "good guy" characters) as they followed a series of tension-building events, which culminated in a wrestling match or series of matches.

== Results ==
No.	Results	Stipulations
1	El Ángel, Sexy Francis, Lady Apache and Mascarita Sagrada vs. El Texano, Polvo de Estrellas, Tiffany and Mini Abismo Negro ended in a no contest	Relevos Atómicos de Locura match
2	The Monsther, Pirata Morgan and Tinieblas Jr. defeated El Alebrije, Hijo del Anibal and Tinieblas Sr. by disqualification.	Best two-out-of-three falls six-man "Lucha Libre rules" tag team match
3	CIMA, Electroshock and El Intocable defeated Mr. Águila, Charly Manson and Hator	Best two-out-of-three falls six-man "Lucha Libre rules" tag team match
4	Psicosis vs. Psicosis II ended in a no contest	Apuesta por el Nombre match for the rights to the name "Psicosis"
5	Juventud Guerrera, Luzbel and El Zorro defeated Al Katrazz, Predator and Apocalypse by disqualification	Best two-out-of-three falls six-man "Lucha Libre rules" tag team match
6	Konnan defeated Vampiro by technical knock out	Singles match
7	Latin Lover, La Parka and Octagón defeated Los Hell Brothers (Chessman and Cibernético) and Fuerza Guerrera	Best two-out-of-three falls six-man "Lucha Libre rules" tag team match
