= Guerra de Titanes (2003) =

2003 Lucha Libre AAA World Wide event

Guerra de Titanes 2003
- Poster
- Promotion: AAA
- Date: November 30, 2003
- City: Naucalpan, Mexico
- Venue: El Toreo
- Attendance: 18,000

Pay-per-view chronology
| ← Previous; Verano de Escándalo | Next → Rey de Reyes |

Guerra de Titanes chronology
| ← Previous; 2002 | Next → 2004 |

Guerra de Titanes (2003) ("War of the Titans") was the seventh Guerra de Titanes professional wrestling show promoted by AAA. The show took place on November 30, 2003 in Naucalpan, Mexico. The show featured the semi-finals and finals of the " Televisa Tag Team Tournament" which was the teams of David Young and Mr. Águila, Heavy Metal and El Zorro, Latin Lover and Michael Shane and Jason the Terrible and Ghefar.

== Production ==
=== Background ===
Starting in 1997 the Mexican professional wrestling, company AAA has held a major wrestling show late in the year, either November or December, called Guerra de Titanes ("War of the Titans"). The show often features championship matches or Lucha de Apuestas or bet matches where the competitors risked their wrestling mask or hair on the outcome of the match. In Lucha Libre the Lucha de Apuetas match is considered more prestigious than a championship match and a lot of the major shows feature one or more Apuesta matches. The Guerra de Titanes show is hosted by a new location each year, emanating from cities such as Madero, Chihuahua, Chihuahua, Mexico City, Guadalajara, Jalisco and more. The 2003 Guerra de Titanes show was the seventh show in the series.

=== Storylines ===
The Guerra de Titanes show featured eight professional wrestling matches with different wrestlers involved in pre-existing, scripted feuds, plots, and storylines. Wrestlers were portrayed as either heels (referred to as rudos in Mexico, those that portray the "bad guys") or faces (técnicos in Mexico, the "good guy" characters) as they followed a series of tension-building events, which culminated in a wrestling match or series of matches.

== Results ==
| No. | Results | Stipulations | Times |
|---|---|---|---|
| 1 | El Chamagol, Chiva Rayada, and Nino de Oro defeated Los Diabolicos (Angel Mortal, Mr. Condor, and Gallego) | Six-man "Lucha Libre rules" tag team match | 8:45 |
| 2 | Cinthia Moreno, Mascarita Sagrada, El Oriental, and Pimpinela Escarlata defeated Faby Apache, Mini Abismo Negro, Gran Apache, and Polvo de Estrellas | Eight-man "Atómicos" tag team match | 10:10 |
| 3 | Los Misioneros de la Muerte (El Signo, El Texano, and Negro Navarro) defeated Santa Claus, Sangre Chicana, and Pirata Morgan by disqualification | Six-man "Lucha Libre rules" tag team match | 9:34 |
| 4 | Electroshock, El Hijo del Solitario, and Televisa Deportes defeated Juventud Guerrera and The Headhunters (A and B) | Six-man "Lucha Libre rules" tag team match | 12:12 |
| 5 | Gronda, Octagón, and La Parka defeated Lucha Libre Latina (Abismo Negro, Chessman, and Cibernético) by disqualification | Six-man "Lucha Libre rules" tag team match | 9:59 |
| 6 | David Young and Mr. Águila defeated Heavy Metal and El Zorro | Semi-final tag team match in the Televisa Tag Team Tournament | 5:20 |
| 7 | Latin Lover and Michael Shane defeated Jason the Terrible and Ghefar | Semi-final tag team match in the Televisa Tag Team Tournament | 4:30 |
| 8 | Latin Lover and Michael Shane defeated Mr. Aguila and David Young | Final tag team match in the Televisa Tag Team Tournament | 7:30 |

=== Televisa Tag Team Tournament ===
1st Round; Sin Limite: Guerra De Titanes; November 30, 2003 (Aired: December 14)
David Young and Mr. Águila | Win
El Zorro and Heavy Metal | 5:20
Jason the Terrible and Ghefar | 4:30
Latin Lover and Michael Shane | Win

Final; Sin Limite: Guerra De Titanes; November 30, 2003 (Aired: December 14)
David Young and Mr. Águila | 7:30
Latin Lover and Michael Shane | Win
