= Rey de Reyes (2007) =

2007 Lucha Libre AAA World Wide event

- Official logo of the 2007 Rey de Reyes depicting the "trophy sword" awarded to the winner.
- Promotion: AAA
- Date: March 18, 2007
- City: Naucalpan, Mexico State, Mexico
- Venue: Toreo de Cuatro Caminos
- Attendance: 17,000

Event chronology
← Previous; Guerra de Titanes	Next → Triplemanía XV

Rey de Reyes chronology
← Previous; 2006	Next → 2008

The Rey de Reyes 2007 (Spanish for "King of Kings") was the fourth 11th Rey de Reyes professional wrestling tournament and show, produced by the Mexican wrestling promotion AAA. The event took place on March 18, 2007, in the Toreo de Cuatro Caminos arena in Naucalpan, Mexico State, Mexico. The main focus of the 2007 Rey de Reyes show was the finals of the Rey de Reyes tournament and a match between the Stable "Los Hell Brothers" (Cibernético, Chessman and Charly Manson) and the "Outsider" group known as La Legión Extranjera (Muerta Cibernetica, Scott Steiner and Kenzo Suzuki). As in previous years there were no qualifying matches for the Rey de Reyes; instead, six people competed in an elimination match to determine the 2007 Rey de Reyes. The participants in the finals were a mixture of AAA mainstays (La Parka (the AAA version), Octagón, Abismo Negro), a Total Nonstop Action Wrestling representative (Rhino) and two wrestlers making special appearances (Fuerza Guerrera and Latin Lover). Included in the show was the finals of a tournament to crown the first AAA World Tag Team Champions. During the tournament four teams all tied for first which meant that the four teams would face off in an elimination match to determine the new champions. The teams were the Black Family (Dark Cuervo and Dark Ozz), The Mexican Powers (Crazy Boy and Joe Líder), Los Guapos (Alan Stone and Zumbido) and Real Fuerza Aérea (Pegasso and Super Fly). The undercard included a storyline between Billy Boy and his real life father-in-law Gran Apache, which culminated in a Lucha de Apuestas match where both wrestlers put their hair on the line.

== Production ==
=== Background ===
Starting in 1997, and every year since then, the Mexican Lucha Libre, or professional wrestling, company AAA has held a Rey de Reyes (Spanish for "King of Kings') show in the spring. The 1997 version was held in February, while all subsequent Rey de Reyes shows were held in March. As part of their annual Rey de Reyes event, AAA holds the eponymious Rey de Reyes tournament to determine that specific year's Rey. Most years the show hosts both the qualifying round and the final match, but on occasion the qualifying matches have been held prior to the event as part of AAA's weekly television shows. The traditional format consists of four preliminary rounds, each a Four-man elimination match with each of the four winners face off in the tournament finals, again under elimination rules. There have been years where AAA has employed a different format to determine a winner. The winner of the Rey de Reyes tournament is given a large ornamental sword to symbolize their victory, but is normally not guaranteed any other rewards for winning the tournament, although some years becoming the Rey de Reyes has earned the winner a match for the AAA Mega Championship. From 1999 through 2009 AAA also held an annual Reina de Reinas ("Queen of Queens") tournament, but later turned that into an actual championship that could be defended at any point during the year, abandoning the annual tournament concept. The 2007 show was the 11th Rey de Reyes show in the series.

=== Storylines ===
The Rey de Reyes show featured six professional wrestling matches with different wrestlers involved in pre-existing, scripted feuds, plots, and storylines. Wrestlers were portrayed as either heels (referred to as rudos in Mexico, those that portray the "bad guys") or faces (técnicos in Mexico, the "good guy" characters) as they followed a series of tension-building events, which culminated in a wrestling match or series of matches.

== Event ==
During the event Antonio Peña and Rey Mysterio, Jr. were announced as the first inductees into the AAA Hall of Fame. Honoring the AAA founder Peña and Mysterio. Rey Mysterio, Jr. was inducted for his contributions to AAA during the early part of his career.

== Results ==
No.	Results	Stipulations
1	Mascarita Divina, Mascarita Sagrada and Octagóncito defeated Mini Abismo Negro, Mini Charly Manson and Mini Chessman	Six-man "Lucha Libre rules" tag team match
2	The Black Family (Dark Cuervo and Dark Ozz) defeated The Mexican Powers (Crazy Boy and Joe Líder), Los Guapos (Alan Stone and Zumbido) and Real Fuerza Aérea (Pegasso and Super Fly): Pegasso pinned Zumbido (Eliminating Los Guapos); Dark Cuvero pinned Pegasso, Dark Ozz pinned Super Fly (Eliminating Real Fuerza Aérea); Dark Ozz pinned Joe Líder (Eliminating the Mexican Powers)	Elimination match for the AAA World Tag Team Championship
3	Gran Apache defeated Billy Boy	Two out of three falls match Lucha de Apuestas "Hair vs. Hair"
4	El Alebrije, Brazo de Plata, Taiji Ishimori, and El Zorro defeated Antifaz del Norte, Histeria (wrestler), Kaoma Jr. and Mr. Niebla	Eight-man "Atómicos" tag team match
5	Los Hell Brothers (Cibernético, Chessman and Charly Manson) defeated La Legión Extranjera (Muerta Cibernetica, Scott Steiner and Kenzo Suzuki)	Six-man "Lucha Libre rules" tag team match
6	La Parka defeated Octagón, Abismo Negro, Rhino, Fuerza Guerrera and Latin Lover: Octagón eliminated Fuerza Guerrera; Rhino eliminated Octagón; Abismo Negro eliminated Latin Lover; La Parka eliminated Abismo Negro; La Parka eliminated Rhino	Rey de Reyes finals, six-man elimination match
