= Real Fuerza Aérea =

Professional wrestling stable

Statistics
- Members: Aero Star; El Ángel; Argenis; Argos; Atomic Boy; Gato Eveready; Laredo Kid; Nemesis; Octagón (mentor); El Oriental (mentor); Pegasso; Rey Cometa; Super Fly; Dizzy; Fénix; Sugi; Ludxor; Venum; Máscara de Bronce; Lanceloth
- Name(s): Real Fuerza Aérea; Real Fuerza Aérea AAA
- Debut: 2006
- Disbanded: 2013

Real Fuerza Aérea (Spanish for "Royal Air Force") was a Mexican professional wrestling group, or stable, active in the Mexican professional wrestling promotion Asistencia, Asesoría y Administración (AAA) and consists of young tecnicos (Face or "good guys") who all use a high flying, high risk wrestling style.

== History ==
AAA created the Real Fuerza Aérea stable in early 2006 when it teamed up a group the young, high flying wrestlers Laredo Kid, Super Fly, Rey Cometa and Nemesis, making Laredo Kid the leader of the group and pairing them with veteran El Oriental as their Padrino, or mentor. Their first significant appearance as a team was at Laredo Kid, Super Fly and Nemesis lost to Los Diabolicos (Ángel Mortal, Mr. Condor and Marabunta) at the 2006 Rey de Reyes event. Real Fuerza Aérea soon expanded with several other young, high flying tecnico wrestlers such as Aero Star, Pegasso and Rey Cometa. With such a large group, six members at its height, not all wrestlers received the same focus from AAA and often ended up teaming with someone else in opening matches or not appearing on TV for long stretches of time. The main focus was Laredo Kid, Super Fly and Aero Star, who were promoted as the stars of the group especially from 2007 and forward. The team challenged the Black Family (Dark Ozz, Dark Espiritu, Dark Cuervo and Dark Escoria for the Mexican National Atómicos Championship at Triplemanía XIV, but the match ended in a no-contest. As a result of the match the Atómicos title was held up, but the Black Family won the rematch the following month. By 2007 Nemesis was all but gone from AAA and instead El Ángel was brought into the group. Pegasso and Super Fly qualified for the finals of a tournament to crown the first AAA World Tag Team Champions at the 2007 Rey de Reyes show. The match was a four-corners elimination match that also included Guapos VIP (Alan Stone and Zumbido), The Mexican Powers (Crazy Boy and Joe Líder) and winners The Black Family (Dark Cuervo and Dark Ozz). Real Fuerza Aérea's storyline feud with the Dark Family continued throughout 2007 and into 2008 with Aero Star, Rey Cometa and Super Fly defeating Dark Cuervo, Dark Ozz and Dark Escoria at the 2007 Guerra de Titanes, while the Dark Family won against Aero Star, El Ángel and Super Fly at Triplemanía XVI.

In mid-2008 Rey Cometa and Pegasso both left AAA due to lack of work. The duo worked as Real Fuerza Aérea in International Wrestling Revolution Group (IWRG) without any complaints from AAA, but when the duo signed on with Consejo Mundial de Lucha Libre (CMLL), AAA's main rival AAA threatened to take legal action if they used the group name there as well. With Cometa and Pegasso gone from AAA and Laredo Kid being out with a long-term injury, Argenis began working with the group, initially as an unofficial member of the group. Over the years both Super Fly and Laredo Kid were involved in story lines that took them away from the group for a while but both returned to teaming with other members of Real Fuerza Aérea after those storylines ended. When El Oriental turned Rudo his role as Padrino for the group was given to AAA veteran Octagón. In 2009 Aero Star began a storyline which saw him team with Faby Apache to win the AAA World Mixed Tag Team Championship, working less with Real Fuerza Aérea. In mid-2009 El Ángel left AAA, making room for Argenis to become an official member. The team were also joined by Atomic Boy, first unofficially but by the end of 2009 he became an official member. Gato Eveready/El Gato and Dizzy have both been associated with the group, but never officially announced as members. After over a year of on and off teasing of a rudo turn, Super Fly finally turned on November 28, 2010, when he, along with members of La Milicia, attacked Aero Star and Octagón, revealing himself as the man who had attacked and bloodied Octagón prior to Héroes Inmortales IV. With his turn, Super Fly left Real Fuerza Aérea and joined La Milicia and its umbrella group La Sociedad. In June 2011, Argenis' brother Astro Boy II jumped from CMLL to AAA and joined Real Fuerza Aérea under the new ring name Argos. On February 10, 2012, Argos turned on Argenis and Real Fuerza Aérea to join rudo group El Consejo. On March 11, Super Fly returned to Real Fuerza Aérea after being kicked out of La Sociedad the previous November. By 2013, Real Fuerza Aérea was disbanded with Aero Star talking about the possibility of forming a new group with up-and-coming high flyers.

== La Nueva Real Fuerza Aérea ==
In 2017, Venum formed "La Nueva Real Fuerza Aérea" along with Máscara de Bronce and Lanceloth.

== Championships and accomplishments ==
- Asistencia Asesoría y Administración

- Alas de Oro (2008) – Aero Star
- Copa Antonio Peña (2010) – Aero Star
- Luchando Por un Sueño (2006) – Laredo Kid
