= Rey de Reyes (2003) =

2003 Lucha Libre AAA World Wide event

Rey de Reyes 2003
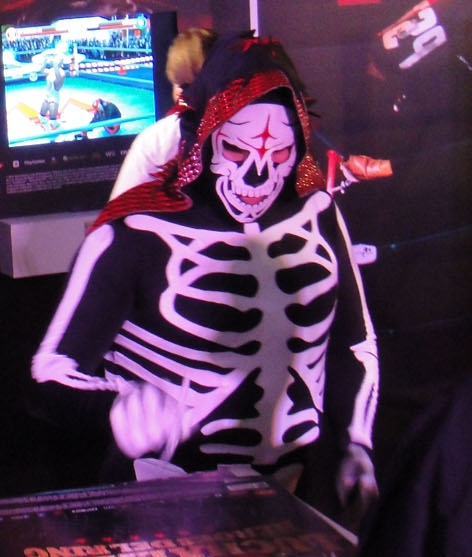
- La Parka Jr. 2003 Rey de Reyes
- Promotion: AAA
- Date: March 16, 2003
- City: Zapopan, Jalisco, Mexico
- Venue: Auditorio Benito Juarez de Zapopan

Event chronology
← Previous; Guerra de Titanes	Next → Triplemanía XI

Rey de Reyes chronology
← Previous; 2002	Next → 2004

The Rey de Reyes 2003 (Spanish for "King of Kings") was the seventh annual Rey de Reyes professional wrestling tournament and show, produced by the Mexican wrestling promotion AAA. The event took place on March 16, 2003, at the Auditorio Benito Juarez de Zapopan in Zapopan, Jalisco, Mexico. In a break from tradition that year's Rey de Reyes tournament featured six former Rey de Reyes winners wrestling each other to determine 2003's Rey de Reyes. The final match saw La Parka, Jr. compete against Abismo Negro.

== Production ==
=== Background ===
Starting in 1997 and every year since then the Mexican Lucha Libre, or professional wrestling, company AAA has held a Rey de Reyes (Spanish for "King of Kings') show in the spring. The 1997 version was held in February, while all subsequent Rey de Reyes shows were held in March. As part of their annual Rey de Reyes event AAA holds the eponymious Rey de Reyes tournament to determine that specific year's Rey. Most years the show hosts both the qualifying round and the final match, but on occasion the qualifying matches have been held prior to the event as part of AAA's weekly television shows. The traditional format consists of four preliminary rounds, each a Four-man elimination match with each of the four winners face off in the tournament finals, again under elimination rules. There have been years where AAA has employed a different format to determine a winner. The winner of the Rey de Reyes tournament is given a large ornamental sword to symbolize their victory, but is normally not guaranteed any other rewards for winning the tournament, although some years becoming the Rey de Reyes has earned the winner a match for the AAA Mega Championship. From 1999 through 2009 AAA also held an annual Reina de Reinas ("Queen of Queens") tournament, but later turned that into an actual championship that could be defended at any point during the year, abandoning the annual tournament concept. The 2003 show was the seventh Rey de Reyes show in the series.

=== Storylines ===
The Rey de Reyes show featured at least four professional wrestling matches with different wrestlers involved in pre-existing scripted feuds, plots and storylines. Wrestlers portray either heels (referred to as rudos in Mexico, those that portrayed the "bad guys") or faces (técnicos in Mexico, the "good guy" characters) as they followed a series of tension-building events, which culminated in a wrestling match or series of matches. Records for four of matches have been found for the 2003 Rey de Reyes show, but it is possible more took place.

== Results ==
No.	Results	Stipulations
1	Oscar Sevilla and Los Barrio Boys (Alan, Billy Boy and Decnnis defeated Chessman, El Picudo, Psicosis and Vangelis	Eight-man Lucha Libre rules tag team match
2	El Dandy, Heavy Metal and Pirata Morgan defeated El Hijo del Perro Aguayo, Hombre Sin Nombre and Máscara Sagrada	Six-man Lucha Libre rules tag team match
3	Abismo Negro and La Parka Jr. defeated Canek, Cibernético, Latin Lover and Octagón	2003 Rey de Reyes tournament semi-final
4	La Parka Jr. defeated Abismo Negro	2003 Rey de Reyes tournament final

=== Tournament bracket ===
1st Round; Rey de Reyes; March 16, 2003
Abismo Negro	Win
El Canek	—
Cibernético	—
La Parka Jr.	Win
Latin Lover	—
Octagón	—

Final; Rey de Reyes; March 16, 2003
Abismo Negro	—
La Parka Jr.	Win
