= Rey de Reyes (2019) =

2019 Lucha Libre AAA World Wide event

- Official poster of the 2019 Rey de Reyes
- Promotion: Lucha Libre AAA World Wide
- Date: March 16, 2019
- City: Puebla, Puebla, Mexico
- Venue: Acrópolis Puebla

Event chronology
| ← Previous; Guerra de Titanes | Next → Verano de Escándalo |

Rey de Reyes chronology
| ← Previous; 2018 | Next → 2021 |

The 2019 Rey de Reyes (Spanish for "King of Kings") was a professional wrestling event produced by the Lucha Libre AAA World Wide, or simply AAA, promotion. The 2019 version was the 23rd year in a row that AAA held a Rey de Reyes show and tournament.

This event was attended by the American partner company All Elite Wrestling (Cody and The Young Bucks) where they began their partnership between companies.

== Production ==
=== Background ===
Starting in 1997 and every year since then, the Mexican Lucha Libre, or professional wrestling, company AAA has held a Rey de Reyes (Spanish for "King of Kings') show in the spring. The 1997 version was held in February, while all subsequent Rey de Reyes shows were held in March. As part of their annual Rey de Reyes event AAA holds the eponymious Rey de Reyes tournament to determine that specific year's Rey. Most years the show hosts both the qualifying round and the final match, but on occasion the qualifying matches have been held prior to the event as part of AAA's weekly television shows. The traditional format consists of four preliminary rounds, each a Four-man elimination match with each of the four winners face off in the tournament finals, again under elimination rules. There have been years where AAA has employed a different format to determine a winner. The winner of the'Rey de Reyes tournament is given a large ornamental sword to symbolize their victory, but is normally not guaranteed any other rewards for winning the tournament, although some years becoming the Rey de Reyes has earned the winner a match for the AAA Mega Championship. From 1999 through 2009 AAA also held an annual Reina de Reinas ("Queen of Queens") tournament, but later turned that into an actual championship that could be defended at any point during the year, abandoning the annual tournament concept. The 2019 show was the 23rd Rey de Reyes show in the series.

=== Storylines ===
The 2019 Rey de Reyes featured eight professional wrestling matches with different wrestlers involved in pre-existing, scripted feuds, plots, and storylines. Wrestlers were portrayed as either heels (referred to as rudos in Mexico, those that portray the "bad guys") or faces (técnicos in Mexico, the "good guy" characters) as they followed a series of tension-building events, which culminated in a wrestling match or series of matches.

== Results ==
| No. | Results | Stipulations |
|---|---|---|
| 1 | Niño Hamburguesa and Big Mami (c) defeated Villano III Jr. and Lady Maravilla | Mixed tag team match for the AAA World Mixed Tag Team Championship |
| 2 | Lady Shani (c) defeated Keyra, La Hiedra and Chik Tormenta | Four-way Street fight match for the AAA Reina de Reinas Championship |
| 3 | El Nuevo Poder del Norte (Carta Brava Jr., Mocho Cota Jr. and Tito Santana) defeated Los Perros del Mal (Daga, Joe Líder and Taya) | Six-man tag team match |
| 4 | Los OGT's (Averno, Chessman and Super Fly) defeated Drago, Pagano and Puma King | Six-man tag team match |
| 5 | Las Fresas Salvajes (Mamba and Máximo) and Psycho Clown defeated Jeff Jarrett, Killer Kross and La Máscara | Six-man tag team Steel cage match |
| 6 | Aero Star defeated Laredo Kid, El Hijo del Vikingo, Jack Evans, Sammy Guevara, Taurus, Golden Magic, Myzteziz Jr. and Eclipse Vengador Jr. | 2019 Rey de Reyes tournament |
| 7 | Lucha Brothers (Fénix and Pentagón Jr.) defeated Los Mercenarios (El Texano Jr. and Rey Escorpión) (c) | Tag team match for the AAA World Tag Team Championship |
| 8 | The Young Bucks (Matt Jackson and Nick Jackson) defeated Lucha Brothers (Fénix and Pentagón Jr.) (c) | Tag team match for the AAA World Tag Team Championship |
(c) / – the champion(s) heading into the match

== See also ==
- 2019 in professional wrestling
