= Rey de Reyes (2006) =

2006 Lucha Libre AAA World Wide event

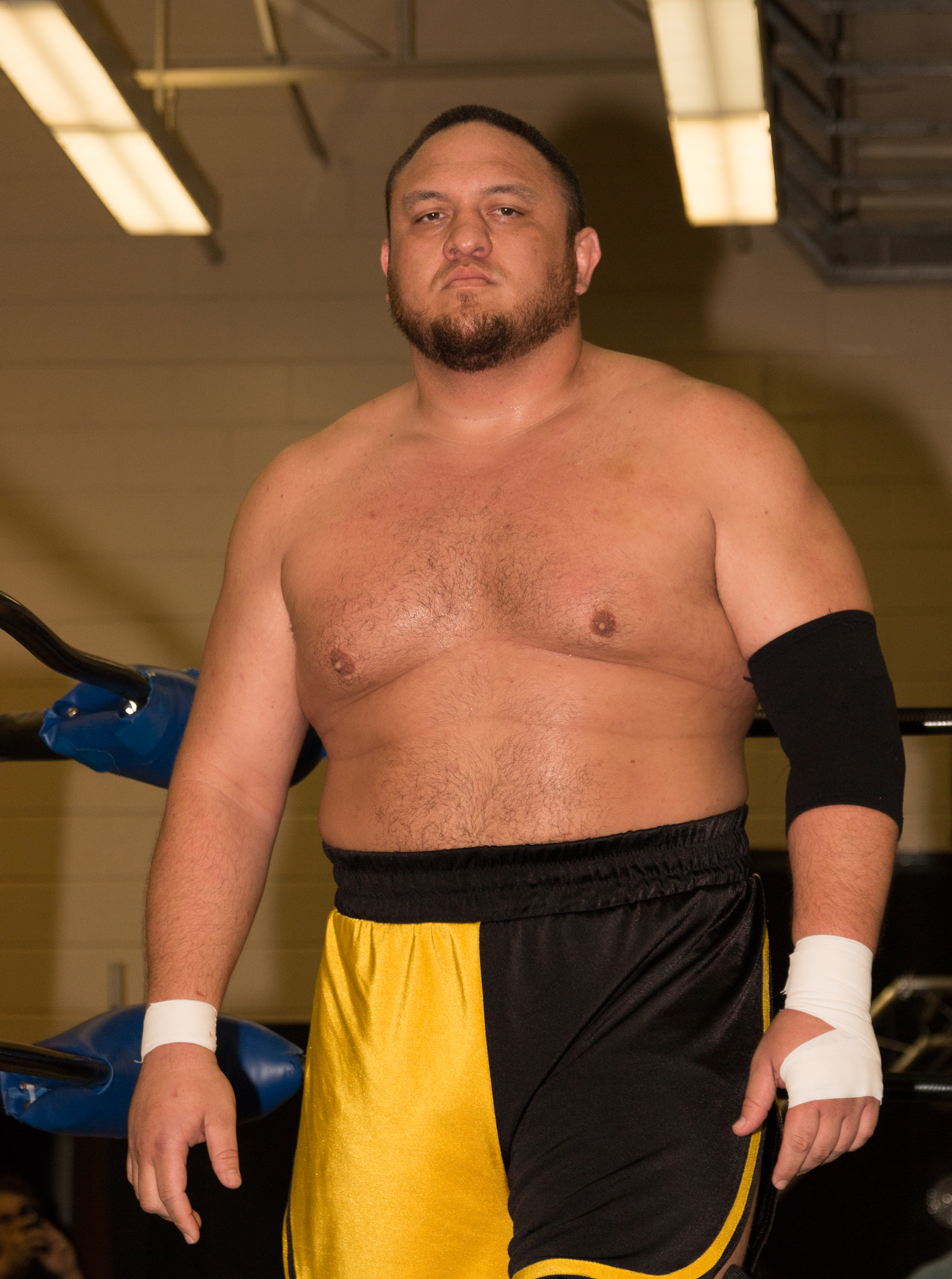
- Samoa Joe, represented Team TNA
- Promotion: AAA
- Date: March 10, 2006
- City: Ciudad Madero, Tamaulipas, Mexico
- Venue: Convention Center
- Attendance: 18,000

Event chronology
← Previous; Guerra de Titanes	Next → Triplemanía XIV

Rey de Reyes chronology
← Previous; 2005	Next → 2007

The Rey de Reyes 2006 (Spanish for "King of Kings") was the tenth annual Rey de Reyes professional wrestling tournament and show, produced by the Mexican wrestling promotion AAA. The event took place on March 11, 2005 in the Convention Center in Ciudad Madero, Tamaulipas, Mexico. The main focus of the 2006 Rey de Reyes show was the tenth annual Rey de Reyes tournament which was contested as a multiman elimination match that saw four teams of three compete against each other until one man remained in the end. The teams were: Team AAA (La Parka, Octagón and Vampiro), La Secta Cibernetica (Chessman, Cibernético and Muerte Cibernetica), Team TNA (Konnan, Ron Killings and Samoa Joe) and Los Guapos (Scorpio Jr., Shocker and Zumbido). The undercard included a traditional six man "Lucha Libre rules" tag team match between two of AAA’s stables in Los Diabolicos (Mr. Condor, Àngel Mortal and Gallego) and Real Fuerza Aérea (Laredo Kid, Nemesis and Super Fly).

== Production ==
=== Background ===
Starting in 1997 and every year since then the Mexican Lucha Libre, or professional wrestling, company AAA has held a Rey de Reyes (Spanish for "King of Kings') show in the spring. The 1997 version was held in February, while all subsequent Rey de Reyes shows were held in March. As part of their annual Rey de Reyes event AAA holds the eponymious Rey de Reyes tournament to determine that specific year's Rey. Most years the show hosts both the qualifying round and the final match, but on occasion the qualifying matches have been held prior to the event as part of AAA's weekly television shows. The traditional format consists of four preliminary rounds, each a Four-man elimination match with each of the four winners face off in the tournament finals, again under elimination rules. There have been years where AAA has employed a different format to determine a winner. The winner of the Rey de Reyes tournament is given a large ornamental sword to symbolize their victory, but is normally not guaranteed any other rewards for winning the tournament, although some years becoming the Rey de Reyes has earned the winner a match for the AAA Mega Championship. From 1999 through 2009 AAA also held an annual Reina de Reinas ("Queen of Queens") tournament, but later turned that into an actual championship that could be defended at any point during the year, abandoning the annual tournament concept. The 2006 show was the tenth Rey de Reyes show in the series.

=== Storylines ===
The Rey de Reyes show featured six professional wrestling matches with different wrestlers involved in pre-existing, scripted feuds, plots, and storylines. Wrestlers were portrayed as either heels (referred to as rudos in Mexico, those that portray the "bad guys") or faces (técnicos in Mexico, the "good guy" characters) as they followed a series of tension-building events, which culminated in a wrestling match or series of matches.

== Results ==
No.	Results	Stipulations
1	Bulldozer, Darling Boy and Guerrillero defeated Loco Castillo and Los Ku Klux Klan (I and II)	Six-man "Lucha Libre rules" tag team match
2	Los Diabolicos (Ángel Mortal, Mr. Condor and Gallego) defeated Real Fuerza Aérea (Laredo Kid, Nemesis and Super Fly)	Six-man "Lucha Libre rules" tag team match
3	Chikayo Nagashima, La Diabólica, Tiffany and Carlos Amano defeated Cinthia Moreno, Martha Villalobos, Lola Gonzales, and Miss Janeth by disqualification	Eight-man "Atómicos" tag team match
4	El Ángel, Rey Cometa, El Zorro and Pimpinela Escarlata defeated Charly Manson, Electroshock, Hator and Cassandro by disqualification	Eight-man "Atómicos" tag team match
5	El Intocable vs. Alan Stone ended in a no contest	Best two-out-of-three falls
6	Team AAA (La Parka, Octagón and Vampiro) defeated La Secta Cibernetica (Chessman, Cibernético and Muerte Cibernetica), Team TNA (Konnan, Ron Killings and Samoa Joe) and Los Guapos (Scorpio Jr., Shocker and Zumbido): Shocker was counted out.; Team TNA were all disqualified; The eliminations of La Parka, Octagón, Chessman and Muerta Cibernetica are not clear; Final elimination: Vampiro pinned Cibernético to become the 2006 Rey de Reyes.	Elimination match for the 2006 Rey de Reyes trophy
