= Triplemanía XIV =

2006 Lucha Libre AAA World Wide event

- The official logo of Triplemanía XIV
- Promotion: AAA
- Date: June 18, 2006
- City: Naucalpan, Mexico
- Venue: El Toreo
- Attendance: 18,000

Pay-per-view chronology
← Previous; Rey de Reyes	Next → Verano de Escándalo

Triplemanía chronology
← Previous; XIII	Next → XV

Triplemanía XIV was the fourteenth Triplemanía professional wrestling show promoted by AAA. The show took place on June 18, 2006 in Naucalpan, Mexico. The Main event featured a Lucha de Apuestas "Mask vs. Mask" match. The two men that put their masks on the line were La Parka and Muerte Cibernética.

== Production ==
=== Background ===
In early 1992 Antonio Peña was working as a booker and storyline writer for Consejo Mundial de Lucha Libre (CMLL), Mexico's largest and the world's oldest wrestling promotion, and was frustrated by CMLL's very conservative approach to professional wrestling, specifically the style of wrestling known as Lucha Libre (Spanish for "freestyle wrestling"). He joined forced with a number of younger, very talented wrestlers who felt like CMLL was not giving them the recognition they deserved and decided to split from CMLL to create Asistencia Asesoría y Administración, later simply known as "AAA" or Triple A. After making a deal with the Televisa television network AAA held their first show in April 1992. The following year Peña and AAA held their first Triplemanía event, building it into an annual event that would become AAA's Super Bowl event, similar to the WWE's WrestleMania being the biggest show of the year. The 2006 Triplemanía was the 14th year in a row AAA held a Triplemanía show and the 19th overall show under the Triplemanía banner.

=== Storylines ===
The Triplemanía XIV show featured seven professional wrestling matches with different wrestlers involved in pre-existing scripted feuds, plots and storylines. Wrestlers were portrayed as either heels (referred to as rudos in Mexico, those that portray the "bad guys") or faces (técnicos in Mexico, the "good guy" characters) as they followed a series of tension-building events, which culminated in a wrestling match or series of matches.

== Results ==
No.	Results	Stipulations
1	La Parkita, Mascarita Sagrada, and Octagoncito defeated Jerrito Estrada, Mini Abismo Negro, and Mini Chessman	Best two-out-of-three falls six-man "Lucha Libre rules" tag team match
2	Abismo Negro, Gran Apache, La Diabólica and Tiffany defeated El Alebrije, Billy Boy, Estrellita and Faby Apache	Relevos Atómicos de Locura match
3	The Black Family (Chessman, Cuervo, Escoria and Ozz) (c) vs. Real Fuerza Aérea (Laredo Kid, Némesis, Rey Cometa and Super Fly) ended in a no-contest	Best two-out-of-three falls eight-Man "Atómicos" tag team match for the Mexican National Atómicos Championship - As a result of the no contest the Atómicos title was vacated.
4	La Fiera, Mocho Cota, Pimpinela Escarlata and Sangre Chicana vs. Cassandro, El Brazo, Espectro, Jr. and Pirata Morgan ended in a no-contest	Best two-out-of-three falls eight-man "Atómicos" tag team match
5	El Ángel, El Intocable, Octagón and Vampiro defeated Los Guapos VIP (Alan Stone, Scorpio Jr., Shocker and Zumbido)	Best two-out-of-three falls eight-man "Atómicos" tag team match
6	Charly Manson defeated El Zorro (C)	last man standing steel cage Luchas de Apuestas "Hair vs. Hair" for the Mexican National Heavyweight Championship. As a result of his loss El Zorro had his head shaved.
7	La Parka defeated Muerte Cibernética	Best two-out-of-three falls Lucha de Apuesta, "Mask vs. Mask" match. As a result Muerte Cibernetica was unmasked and revealed to be Ricky Banderas.
(c) / – the champion(s) heading into the match
