= Guerra de Titanes (2002) =

2002 Lucha Libre AAA World Wide event

Guerra de Titanes 2002
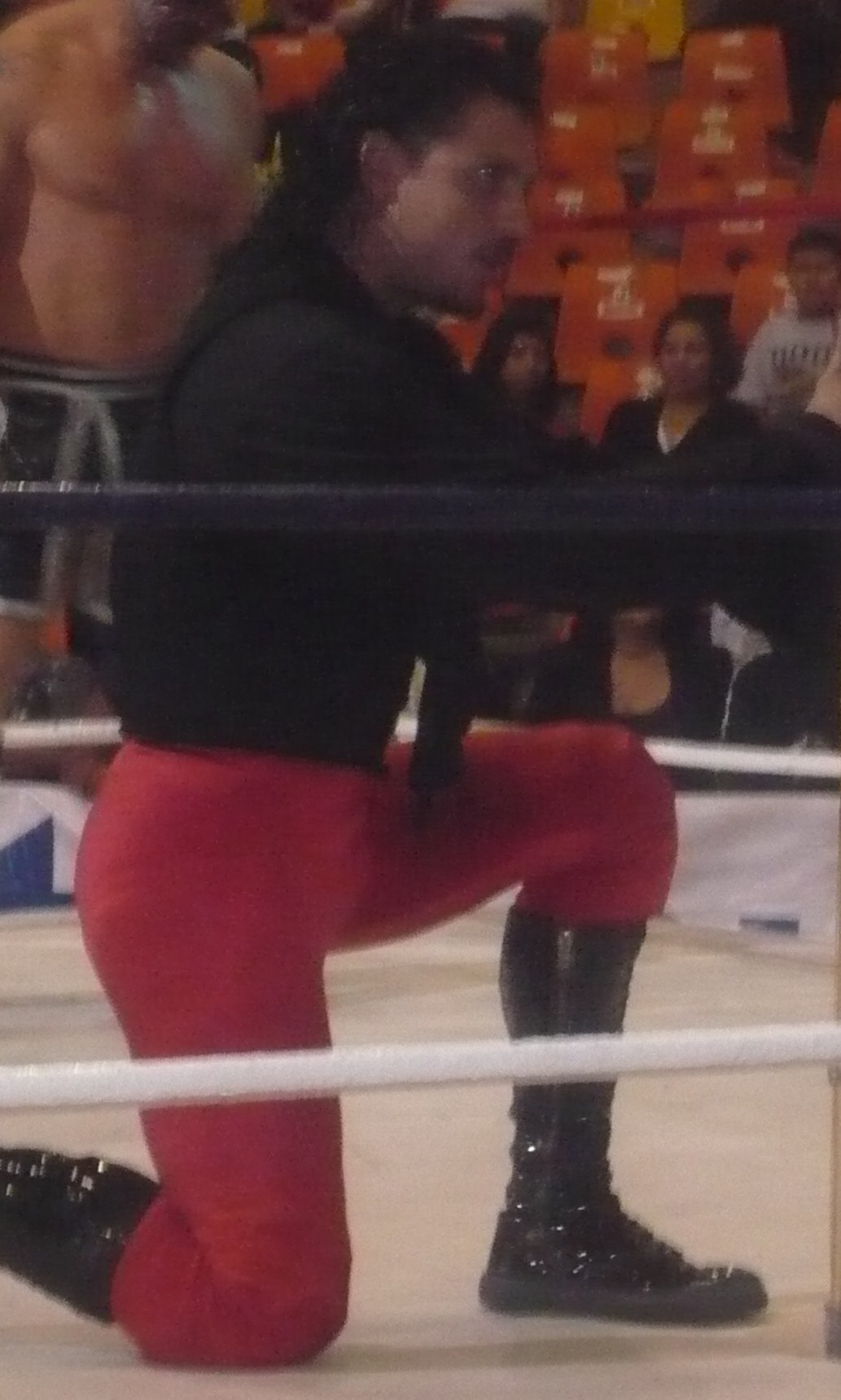
- El Zorro, defeated Electroshock in the third match of the night
- Promotion: AAA
- Date: November 15, 2002
- City: Veracruz, Mexico
- Venue: El Toreo
- Attendance: 11,500

Pay-per-view chronology
← Previous; Verano de Escándalo	Next → Rey de Reyes

Guerra de Titanes chronology
← Previous; 2001	Next → 2003

Guerra de Titanes (2002) ("War of the Titans") was the sixth Guerra de Titanes professional wrestling show promoted by AAA. The show took place on November 15, 2002 in Veracruz, Veracruz, Mexico. The Main event featured an Eight-man "Atómicos" tag team match between the face (good guy) team of El Alebrije, Máscara Sagráda, La Parka and Octagón facing off against the team of Abismo Negro, Cibernético, Monsther and Leatherface, collectively known as "Lucha Libre Latina" (LLL).

== Production ==
=== Background ===
Starting in 1997 the Mexican professional wrestling, company AAA has held a major wrestling show late in the year, either November or December, called Guerra de Titanes ("War of the Titans"). The show often features championship matches or Lucha de Apuestas or bet matches where the competitors risked their wrestling mask or hair on the outcome of the match. In Lucha Libre the Lucha de Apuetas match is considered more prestigious than a championship match and a lot of the major shows feature one or more Apuesta matches. The Guerra de Titanes show is hosted by a new location each year, emanating from cities such as Madero, Chihuahua, Chihuahua, Mexico City, Guadalajara, Jalisco and more. The 2002 Guerra de Titanes show was the sixth show in the series.

=== Storylines ===
The Guerra de Titanes show featured five professional wrestling matches with different wrestlers involved in pre-existing, scripted feuds, plots, and storylines. Wrestlers were portrayed as either heels (referred to as rudos in Mexico, those that portray the "bad guys") or faces (técnicos in Mexico, the "good guy" characters) as they followed a series of tension-building events, which culminated in a wrestling match or series of matches.

== Results ==
No.	Results	Stipulations
1	Mascarita Sagrada, Octagoncito and La Parkita defeated Mini Abismo Negro, Mini Psicosis and Rocky Marvin by disqualification	Six-man "Lucha Libre rules" tag team match
2	the Black Family (Chessman, Cuervo, Escoria and Ozz defeated Los Vipers (Charly Manson, Histeria, Mosco de la Merced and Psicosis)	Eight-man "Atómicos" tag team match
3	El Zorro defeated Electroshock	Singles match
4	Héctor Garza lost a "steel cage" match when he was the last left in the cage Also in the match were: Perro Aguayo Jr., Mr. Águila and Latin Lover	Steel Cage Match
5	El Alebrije, Máscara Sagráda, La Parka and Octagón defeated Abismo Negro, Cibernético, the Monsther and Leatherface	Eight-man "Atómicos" tag team match
