= Rey de Reyes (2001) =

2001 Lucha Libre AAA World Wide event

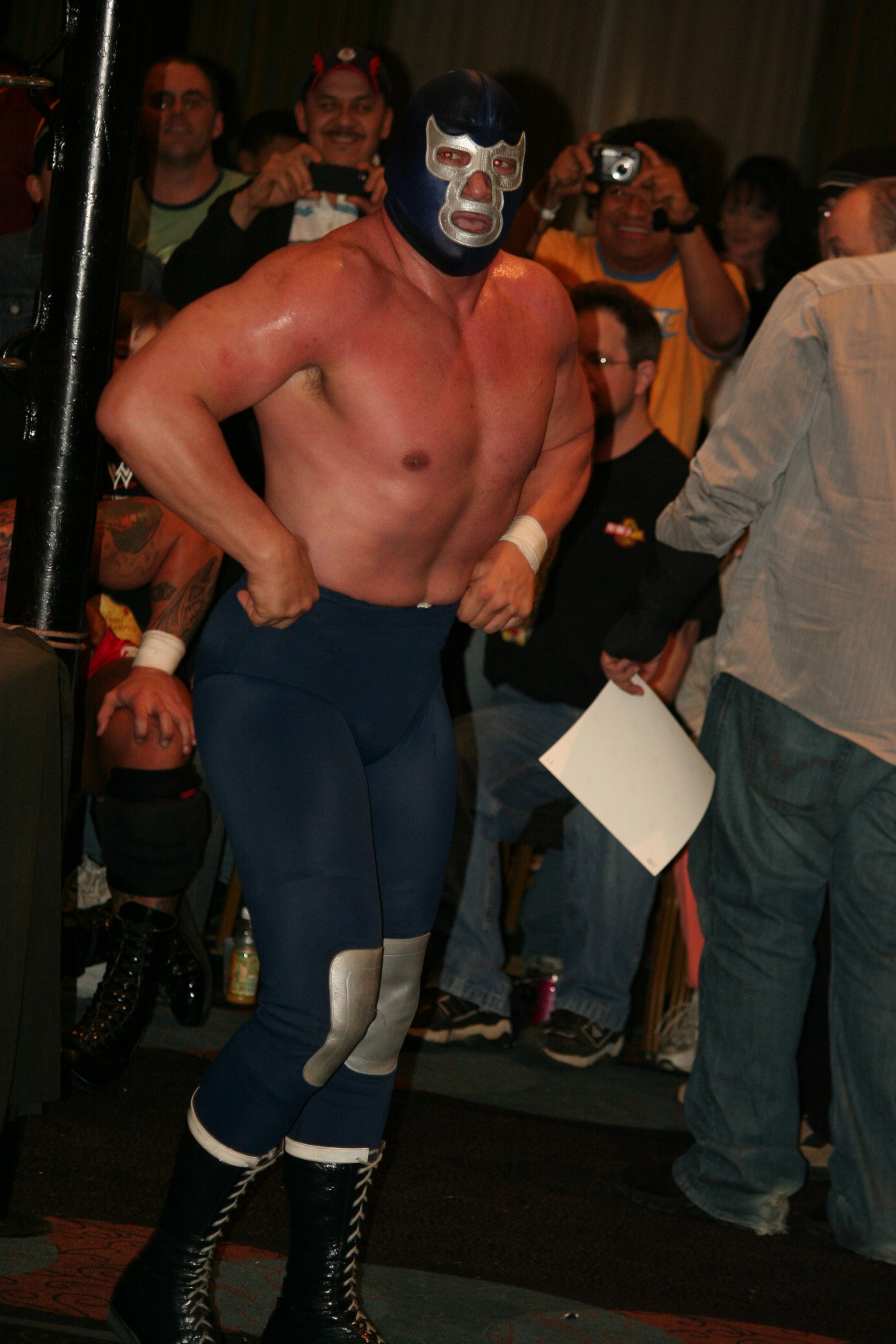
- Blue Demon Jr., participated in the Rey de Reyes tournament
- Promotion: AAA
- Date: March 30, 2001
- City: Ciudad Madero, Tamaulipas, Mexico
- Venue: Convention Center

Event chronology
← Previous; Guerra de Titanes	Next → Triplemanía IX

Rey de Reyes chronology
← Previous; 2000	Next → 2002

The Rey de Reyes 2001 (Spanish for "King of Kings") was the fifth annual Rey de Reyes professional wrestling tournament and show, produced by the Mexican wrestling promotion AAA. The event took place on March 30, 2001 in the Convention Center in Ciudad Madero, Tamaulipas, Mexico. The Rey de Reyes tournament consisted of a semi-final round of four four-man elimination matches and a final match with the winners of each of the semi-finals facing off in an elimination match until only one man remained. The final of the 2001 Rey de Reyes tournament pitted La Parka, Jr., Latin Lover, Abismo Negro and Heavy Metal against each other. The show featured two additional matches beyond the five Rey de Reyes tournament matches.

== Production ==
=== Background ===
Starting in 1997 and every year since then the Mexican Lucha Libre, or professional wrestling, company AAA has held a Rey de Reyes (Spanish for "King of Kings') show in the spring. The 1997 version was held in February, while all subsequent Rey de Reyes shows were held in March. As part of their annual Rey de Reyes event AAA holds the eponymious Rey de Reyes tournament to determine that specific year's Rey. Most years the show hosts both the qualifying round and the final match, but on occasion the qualifying matches have been held prior to the event as part of AAA's weekly television shows. The traditional format consists of four preliminary rounds, each a Four-man elimination match with each of the four winners face off in the tournament finals, again under elimination rules. There have been years where AAA has employed a different format to determine a winner. The winner of the Rey de Reyes tournament is given a large ornamental sword to symbolize their victory, but is normally not guaranteed any other rewards for winning the tournament, although some years becoming the Rey de Reyes has earned the winner a match for the AAA Mega Championship. From 1999 through 2009 AAA also held an annual Reina de Reinas ("Queen of Queens") tournament, but later turned that into an actual championship that could be defended at any point during the year, abandoning the annual tournament concept. The 2001 show was the fifth Rey de Reyes show in the series.

=== Storylines ===
The Rey de Reyes show featured five professional wrestling matches with different wrestlers involved in pre-existing, scripted feuds, plots, and storylines. Wrestlers were portrayed as either heels (referred to as rudos in Mexico, those that portray the "bad guys") or faces (técnicos in Mexico, the "good guy" characters) as they followed a series of tension-building events, which culminated in a wrestling match or series of matches.

== Results ==
No.	Results	Stipulations
1	La Parkita, Mascarita Sagrada and Octagoncito defeated Mini Abismo Negro, Espectrito Jr. and Mini Kahoz	Six-man tag team match
2	Los Vipers (Histeria, Maniaco, Mosco de la Merced and Psicosis) (c) defeated The Black Family (Escoria, Cuervo, Chessman and Charly Manson) and Los Vatos Locos (Espíritu, May Flowers, Nygma and El Picudo)	Three-way elimination match for the Mexican National Atómicos Championship
3	La Parka, Jr. defeated Electroshock, Pirata Morgan and Perro Aguayo Jr.	Rey de Reyes 2001 Semi-final elimination match
4	Latin Lover defeated El Hijo del Solitario, Cibernético and El Cobarde II	Rey de Reyes 2001 Semi-final elimination match
5	Abismo Negro defeated El Texano, Oscar Sevilla and Héctor Garza	Rey de Reyes 2001 Semi-final elimination match
6	Heavy Metal defeated Espectro Jr., Blue Demon Jr. and Pimpinela Escarlata	Rey de Reyes 2001 Semi-final elimination match
7	La Parka, Jr. defeated Latin Lover, Abismo Negro and Heavy Metal	Rey de Reyes 2001 Final elimination match
(c) / – the champion(s) heading into the match

=== Tournament bracket ===
1st Round; Rey de Reyes; March 30, 2001
Cibernético	—
El Cobarde II	—
El Hijo del Solitario	—
Latin Lover	Win
Abismo Negro	Win
El Texano	—
Héctor Garza	—
Oscar Sevilla	—
Electroshock	—
La Parka Jr.	Win
Perro Aguayo Jr.	—
Pirata Morgan	—
Blue Demon Jr.	—
Espectro Jr.	—
Heavy Metal	Win
Pimpinela Escarlata	—

Final; Rey de Reyes; March 30, 2001
Latin Lover	—
Abismo Negro	—
La Parka Jr.	Win
Heavy Metal	—
