= Triplemanía X =

2002 Lucha Libre AAA World Wide event

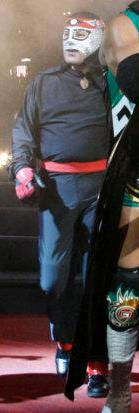
- Octagón, unmasked long time rival Pentagón
- Promotion: AAA
- Date: July 5, 2002
- City: Madero, Mexico
- Venue: Convention Center
- Tagline(s): Poker de Ases (Poker Aces)

Pay-per-view chronology
← Previous; Rey de Reyes	Next → Verano de Escándalo

Triplemanía chronology
← Previous; IX	Next → XI

Triplemanía X was the tenth Triplemanía professional wrestling show promoted by AAA. The show took place on July 5, 2002, in Madero, Mexico. The Main event featured a Lucha de Apuestas match where each wrestler defended the hair of a referee. The participants in this match were Heavy Metal, Sangre Chicana, El Oriental, Electroshock, May Flowers and El Brazo.

== Production ==
=== Background ===
In early 1992 Antonio Peña was working as a booker and storyline writer for Consejo Mundial de Lucha Libre (CMLL), Mexico's largest and the world's oldest wrestling promotion, and was frustrated by CMLL's very conservative approach to professional wrestling, specifically the style of wrestling known as Lucha Libre (Spanish for "freestyle wrestling"). He joined forced with a number of younger, very talented wrestlers who felt like CMLL was not giving them the recognition they deserved and decided to split from CMLL to create Asistencia Asesoría y Administración, later known simply as "AAA" or Triple A. After making a deal with the Televisa television network AAA held their first show in April 1992. The following year Peña and AAA held their first Triplemanía event, building it into an annual event that would become AAA's Super Bowl event, similar to the WWE's WrestleMania being the biggest show of the year. The 2002 Triplemanía was the 10th year in a row AAA held a Triplemanía show and the fifteenth overall show under the Triplemanía banner.

=== Storylines ===
The Triplemanía show featured eight professional wrestling matches with different wrestlers involved in pre-existing scripted feuds, plots and storylines. Wrestlers were portrayed as either heels (referred to as rudos in Mexico, those that portray the "bad guys") or faces (técnicos in Mexico, the "good guy" characters) as they followed a series of tension-building events, which culminated in a wrestling match or series of matches.

== Results ==
No.	Results	Stipulations
1	Dos Caras Jr., Esther Moreno, Pimpinela Escarlata and Mascarita Sagrada defeated Mini Abismo Negro, Shoot Fighting, Sexy Piscis and Tiffany	Relevos Atómicos de Locura match
2	El Oriental defeated Sangre Chicana; Also in the match: Heavy Metal, Electroshock, May Flowers and El Brazo	Lucha de Apuestas "Hair vs. Hair" where each wrestler represented a referee who put his hair on the line.
3	Los Vatos Locos (Espíritu, Nygma, Picudo and Silver Cat) (c) defeated The Black Family (Chessman, Cuervo, Escoria and Ozz)	Best two-out-of-three falls eight-man "Atómicos" tag team match for the Mexican National Atómicos Championship
4	Gran Apache and Los Diabólicos (Mr. Cóndor, Ángel Mortal and El Gallego) defeated Los Vipers (Maniaco, Histeria, Psicosis, and Mosco de la Merced)	Luchas de Apuestas "Hair or Mask vs. Hair" match
5	Perro Aguayo Jr., Mr. Águila and El Zorro defeated Héctor Garza, El Dandy, and Pirata Morgan	Six-man "Lucha Libre rules" tag team match
6	Latin Lover, La Parka, El Alebrije, and Gronda defeated Leatherface, Cibernético, Abismo Negro, and the Monsther	Eight-man "Atómicos" tag team match
7	Máscara Sagrada and Máscara Maligna defeated Pentagón and Octagón	Relevos Suicida
8	Octagón (with Máscara Sagrada) defeated Pentagón (with Màscara Maligna)	Lucha de Apuestas "Mask vs. Mask" match
(c) / – the champion(s) heading into the match

Wagers in match 2

- Heavy Metal represented Pepe Casas
- Sangre Chicana represented El Tirantes
- Oriental represented El Hijo del Tirantes
- Electroshock represented Raul Copetes Salazar
- May Flowers represented Piero
- El Brazo represented El Fresero.
