= Triplemanía IX =

2001 Lucha Libre AAA World Wide event

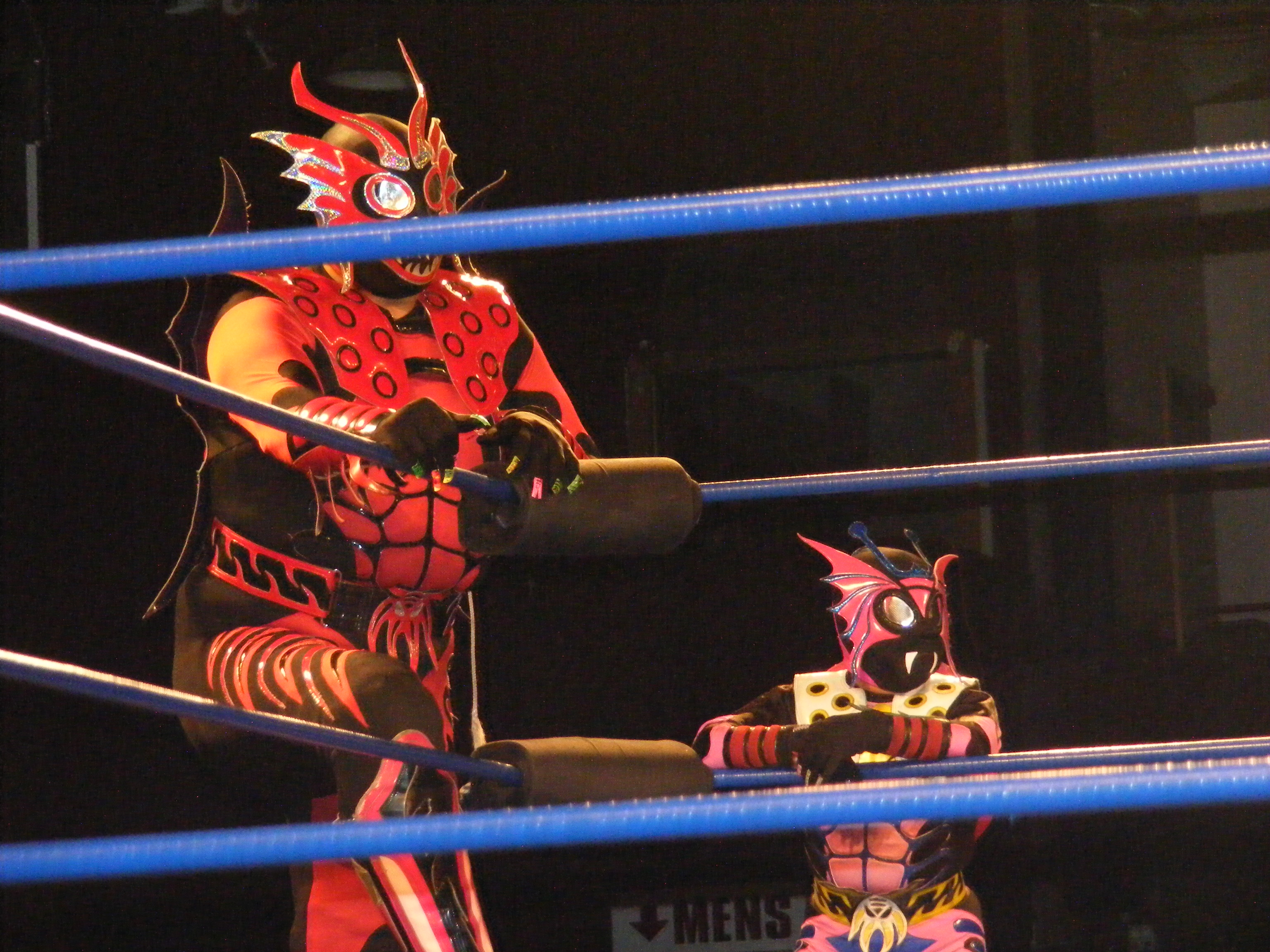
- El Alebrije (and his mascota Cuije), competed in the semi-main event
- Promotion: AAA
- Date: May 26, 2001
- City: Mexico City, Mexico
- Venue: Plaza de Toros
- Attendance: 10,000

Pay-per-view chronology
← Previous; Rey de Reyes	Next → Verano de Escándalo

Triplemanía chronology
← Previous; VIII	Next → X

Triplemanía IX was the ninth Triplemanía professional wrestling show promoted by AAA. The show took place on May 26, 2001 in Mexico City, Mexico. The Main event featured a Dog collar match Lucha de Apuestas match where the last man remaining in the match would have his hair shaved off. The participants were Pirata Morgan, El Cobarde and Sangre Chicana.

== Production ==
=== Background ===
In early 1992 Antonio Peña was working as a booker and storyline writer for Consejo Mundial de Lucha Libre (CMLL), Mexico's largest and the world's oldest wrestling promotion, and was frustrated by CMLL's very conservative approach to professional wrestling, specifically the style of wrestling known as Lucha Libre (Spanish for "freestyle wrestling"). He joined forces with a number of younger, very talented wrestlers who felt like CMLL was not giving them the recognition they deserved and decided to split from CMLL to create Asistencia Asesoría y Administración, later known simply as "AAA" or Triple A. After making a deal with the Televisa television network AAA held their first show in April 1992. The following year Peña and AAA held their first Triplemanía event, building it into an annual event that would become AAA's Super Bowl event, similar to the WWE's WrestleMania being the biggest show of the year. The 2001 Triplemanía was the ninth year in a row AAA held a Triplemanía show and the sixteenth overall show under the Triplemanía banner.

=== Storylines ===
The Triplemanía IX show featured five professional wrestling matches with different wrestlers involved in pre-existing scripted feuds, plots and storylines. Wrestlers were portrayed as either heels (referred to as rudos in Mexico, those that portray the "bad guys") or faces (técnicos in Mexico, the "good guy" characters) as they followed a series of tension-building events, which culminated in a wrestling match or series of matches.

== Results ==
No.	Results	Stipulations	Times
1	Octagóncito, Mascarita Sagrada, and La Parkita defeated Espectrito, Mini Abismo Negro, and Rocky Marvin	Best two-out-of-three falls six-man "Lucha Libre rules" tag team match	—
2	Pimpinela Escarlata, May Flowers, and Polvo de Estrellas defeated Blue Demon Jr., Hijo del Solitario, and Oscar Sevilla	Best two-out-of-three falls six-man "Lucha Libre rules" tag team match	—
3	Los Vipers (Psicosis, Histeria, Maniaco, and Mosco de la Merced) (C) defeated Los Vatos Locos (El Picudo, Silver Cat, Espiritu, and Nygma) - (Mosco de la Merced pinned Espiritu)	Best two-out-of-three falls eight-man "Atómicos" tag team match for the Mexican National Atómicos Championship	09:50
4	Latin Lover defeated Héctor Garza, Perro Aguayo Jr., and Heavy Metal: Héctor Garza pinned Heavy Metal; Latin Lover pinned Perro Aguayo, Jr.; Latin Lover forced Héctor Garza to submit	Póker de Ases, four corners elimination match	11:00
5	Máscara Sagrada, El Alebrije, Octagón, and La Parka Jr. defeated Máscara Maligna, Electroshock, Abismo Negro and Cibernético - (La Parka Jr. forced Abismo Negro to submit.)	Best two-out-of-three falls eight-man "Atómicos" tag team match	16:28
6	Pirata Morgan lost to Sangre Chicana, El Cobarde II was also in the match: El Cobarde touched all four corners to escape; Sangre Chicana touched all four corners to escape	Dog collar match Lucha de Apuestas "Hair vs. Hair" match	—
