= Triplemanía XI =

2003 Lucha Libre AAA World Wide event

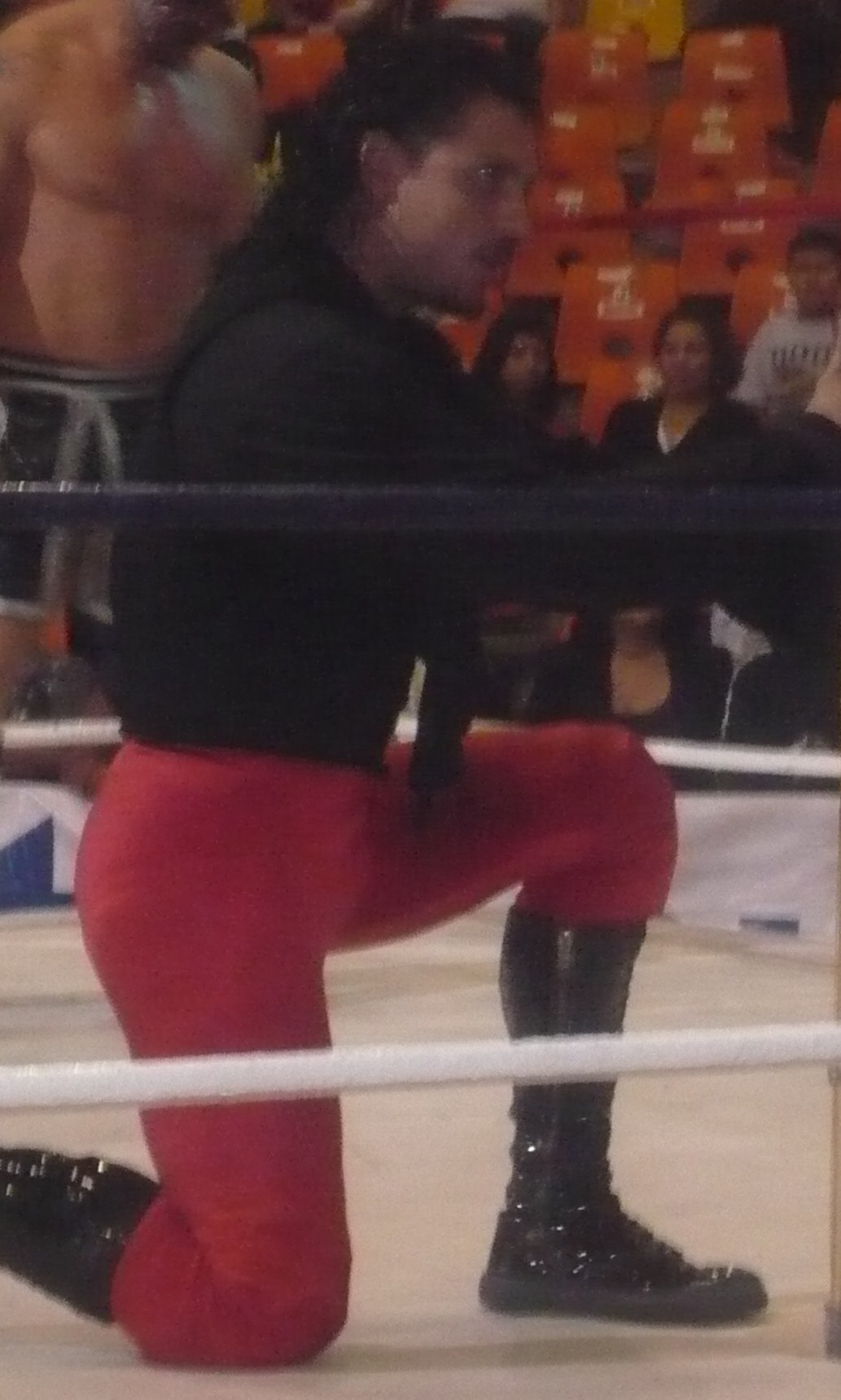
- El Zorro, worked his first Triplemanía show.
- Promotion: AAA
- Date: June 15, 2003
- City: Naucalpan, Mexico
- Venue: El Toreo
- Attendance: 15,000

Pay-per-view chronology
← Previous; Rey de Reyes	Next → Verano de Escándalo

Triplemanía chronology
← Previous; X	Next → XII

Triplemanía XI was the eleventh Triplemanía professional wrestling show promoted by AAA. The show took place on June 15, 2003, in Naucalpan, Mexico. The Main event featured an Eight-man "Atómicos" tag team match where the team of Lizmark, La Parka, Octagón and Super Caló faced the team of Abismo Negro, Cibernético and The Headhunters.

== Production ==
=== Background ===
In early 1992 Antonio Peña was working as a booker and storyline writer for Consejo Mundial de Lucha Libre (CMLL), Mexico's largest and the world's oldest wrestling promotion, and was frustrated by CMLL's very conservative approach to professional wrestling, specifically the style of wrestling known as Lucha Libre (Spanish for "freestyle wrestling"). He joined forced with a number of younger, very talented wrestlers who felt like CMLL was not giving them the recognition they deserved and decided to split from CMLL to create Asistencia Asesoría y Administración later simply known as "AAA" or Triple A. After making a deal with the Televisa television network AAA held their first show in April 1992. The following year Peña and AAA held their first Triplemanía event, building it into an annual event that would become AAA's Super Bowl event, similar to the WWE's WrestleMania being the biggest show of the year. The 2003 Triplemanía was the 11th year in a row AAA held a Triplemanía show and the 16th overall show under the Triplemanía banner.

=== Storylines ===
The Triplemanía XI show featured six professional wrestling matches with different wrestlers involved in pre-existing scripted feuds, plots and storylines. Wrestlers were portrayed as either heels (referred to as rudos in Mexico, those that portray the "bad guys") or faces (técnicos in Mexico, the "good guy" characters) as they followed a series of tension-building events, which culminated in a wrestling match or series of matches.

== Results ==
No.	Results	Stipulations
1	Esther Moreno, Máscara Sagrada, Jr., Mascarita Sagrada and May Flowers defeated Poly Star, El Picudo, Mini Abismo Negro and Polvo de Estrellas by disqualification.	Relevos Atómicos de Locura match
2	Electroshock and Lady Apache defeated Gran Apache and Faby Apache, El Brazo and Martha Villalobos, and Chessman and Tiffany (c)	4 way Mixed tag team elimination match for the AAA World Mixed Tag Team Championship
3	El Hijo del Solitario, Latin Lover and Máscara Sagrada defeated Jason the Terrible, Leatherface and Eddie Watts	Best two-out-of-three falls six-man "Lucha Libre rules" tag team match
4	Rayman and El Zorro defeated Juventud Guerrera and Mr. Águila by disqualification	Tag team match
5	Heavy Metal defeated Pirata Morgan; Also in the match: El Texano and Sangre Chicana	Lucha de Apuestas, "Hair vs. Hair" mask
6	Lizmark, La Parka, Octagón and Super Caló defeated Abismo Negro, Cibernético and The Headhunters (Headhunter A and Headhunter B) by disqualification	Best two-out-of-three falls eight-man "Atómicos" tag team match
(c) / – the champion(s) heading into the match
