= Rey de Reyes (2000) =

2000 Lucha Libre AAA World Wide event

- Official logo of the Rey de Reyes broadcast
- Promotion: AAA
- Date: March 5, 2000
- City: Naucalpan, Mexico State, Mexico
- Venue: Toreo de Cuatro Caminos
- Attendance: 18,000

Event chronology
← Previous; Guerra de Titanes	Next → Triplemanía VIII

Rey de Reyes chronology
← Previous; 1999	Next → 2001

The Rey de Reyes 2000 (Spanish for "King of Kings") was the fourth annual Rey de Reyes professional wrestling tournament and show, produced by the Mexican wrestling promotion AAA. The event took place on March 5, 2000, in the Toreo de Cuatro Caminos arena in Naucalpan, Mexico State, Mexico. The Rey de Reyes tournament consisted of a semi-final round of four four-man elimination matches and a final match with the winners of each of the semi-finals facing off in an elimination match until only one man remained. The final of the 2000 Rey de Reyes tournament pitted Abismo Negro, El Alebrije, Charly Manson, and Cibernético against each other. Besides the five tournament matches the show featured an additional four matches including two Lucha de Apuestas matches, one where the hair of the wrestler's seconds were on the line. The other Apuesta match, which was also the main event match saw both La Parka, Jr. and Gigante Drako put their masks on the line.

== Production ==
=== Background ===
Starting in 1997 and every year since then the Mexican Lucha Libre, or professional wrestling, company AAA has held a Rey de Reyes (Spanish for "King of Kings') show in the spring. The 1997 version was held in February, while all subsequent Rey de Reyes shows were held in March. As part of their annual Rey de Reyes event AAA holds the eponymious Rey de Reyes tournament to determine that specific year's Rey. Most years the show hosts both the qualifying round and the final match, but on occasion the qualifying matches have been held prior to the event as part of AAA's weekly television shows. The traditional format consists of four preliminary rounds, each a Four-man elimination match with each of the four winners face off in the tournament finals, again under elimination rules. There have been years where AAA has employed a different format to determine a winner. The winner of the Rey de Reyes tournament is given a large ornamental sword to symbolize their victory, but is normally not guaranteed any other rewards for winning the tournament, although some years becoming the Rey de Reyes has earned the winner a match for the AAA Mega Championship. From 1999 through 2009 AAA also held an annual Reina de Reinas ("Queen of Queens") tournament, but later turned that into an actual championship that could be defended at any point during the year, abandoning the annual tournament concept. The 2000 show was the fourth Rey de Reyes show in the series.

=== Storylines ===
The Rey de Reyes show featured nine professional wrestling matches with different wrestlers involved in pre-existing, scripted feuds, plots, and storylines. Wrestlers were portrayed as either heels (referred to as rudos in Mexico, those that portray the "bad guys") or faces (técnicos in Mexico, the "good guy" characters) as they followed a series of tension-building events, which culminated in a wrestling match or series of matches.

== Results ==
No.	Results	Stipulations
1	La Parkita, Octagoncito and Mascarita Sagrada defeated Mini Abismo Negro, Mini Psicosis and Rocky Marvin	Six-man "Lucha Libre rules" tag team match
2	Abismo Negro defeated Dos Caras, Killer, and Psicosis	Rey de Reyes 2000 semi-final elimination match
3	El Alebrije defeated Electroshock, Maniaco, and Oscar Sevilla	Rey de Reyes 2000 semi-final elimination match
4	Charly Manson defeated Mascara Ságrada Jr., Histeria, and Path Finder	Rey de Reyes 2000 semi-final elimination match
5	Cibernético defeated Espectro, Jr., Blue Demon Jr. and Mexicano	Rey de Reyes 2000 semi-final elimination match
6	Heavy Metal, Héctor Garza, Octagón and Perro Aguayo Jr. defeated Los Consagrados (El Cobarde II, El Texano, Pirata Morgan and Sangre Chicana)	Eight-man "Lucha Libre rules" tag team match
7	Pentagón defeated El Oriental	Lucha de Apuestas, hair vs. hair of their seconds
8	Abismo Negro defeated El Alebrije, Charly Manson, and Cibernético	Rey de Reyes 2000 Final
9	La Parka, Jr. defeated Gigante Drako	Lucha de Apuesta, mask vs. mask match

=== Tournament bracket ===
1st Round; Sin Limite: Rey de Reyes; March 5, 2000 (Aired: March 12)
Abismo Negro	Win
Dos Caras	—
Psicosis	—
Killer	—
El Alebrije	Win
Electroshock	—
Maniaco	—
Oscar Sevilla	—
Charly Manson	Win
Histeria	—
Máscara Sagrada Jr.	—
Path Finder	—
Blue Demon Jr.	—
Cibernético	Win
Mexicano	—
Espectro Jr.	—

Final; Sin Limite: Rey de Reyes; March 5, 2000 (Aired: March 12)
Abismo Negro	Win
El Alebrije	—
Charly Manson	—
Cibernético	—
