= Rey de Reyes (1998) =

1998 Lucha Libre AAA World Wide event

- Official logo of the Rey de Reyes broadcast
- Promotion: AAA
- Date: March 1, 1998
- City: Naucalpan, Mexico State, Mexico
- Venue: Toreo de Cuatro Caminos
- Attendance: 18,000

Event chronology
← Previous; Guerra de itanes	Next → Triplemanía VI

Rey de Reyes chronology
← Previous; 1997	Next → 1999

The Rey de Reyes 1998 (Spanish for "King of Kings") was the second annual Rey de Reyes professional wrestling tournament and show, produced by the Mexican wrestling promotion AAA. The event took place on March 1, 1998 in the Toreo de Cuatro Caminos arena in Naucalpan, Mexico State, Mexico. The Rey de Reyes tournament consisted of a semi-final round of four four-man elimination matches and a final match with the winners of each of the semi-finals facing off in an elimination match until only one man remained. The final of the 1998 Rey de Reyes tournament pitted Perro Aguayo, Latin Lover, Cibernético and Octagón against each other. Besides the five tournament matches the show also featured a Mini-Estrella match, an Eight-man "Atómicos" tag team match and a steel cage match.

== Production ==
=== Background ===
Starting in 1997 and every year since then the Mexican Lucha Libre, or professional wrestling, company AAA has held a Rey de Reyes (Spanish for "King of Kings') show in the spring. The 1997 version was held in February, while all subsequent Rey de Reyes shows were held in March. As part of their annual Rey de Reyes event AAA holds the eponymious Rey de Reyes tournament to determine that specific year's Rey. Most years the show hosts both the qualifying round and the final match, but on occasion the qualifying matches have been held prior to the event as part of AAA's weekly television shows. The traditional format consists of four preliminary rounds, each a Four-man elimination match with each of the four winners face off in the tournament finals, again under elimination rules. There have been years where AAA has employed a different format to determine a winner. The winner of the Rey de Reyes tournament is given a large ornamental sword to symbolize their victory, but is normally not guaranteed any other rewards for winning the tournament, although some years becoming the Rey de Reyes has earned the winner a match for the AAA Mega Championship. From 1999 through 2009 AAA also held an annual Reina de Reinas ("Queen of Queens") tournament, but later turned that into an actual championship that could be defended at any point during the year, abandoning the annual tournament concept. The 1998 show was the second Rey de Reyes show in the series.

=== Storylines ===
The Rey de Reyes show featured eight professional wrestling matches with different wrestlers involved in pre-existing, scripted feuds, plots, and storylines. Wrestlers were portrayed as either heels (referred to as rudos in Mexico, those that portray the "bad guys") or faces (técnicos in Mexico, the "good guy" characters) as they followed a series of tension-building events, which culminated in a wrestling match or series of matches.

== Results ==
No.	Results	Stipulations
1	Mini Abismo Negro, Mini Electroshock and Mini Psicosis defeated La Parkita, Mini Discovery and Octagóncito	Six-man "Lucha Libre rules" tag team match
2	Los Payasos (Coco Amarillo, Coco Azul, Coco Rojo and Coco Negro) vs. Los Vipers (Histeria, Maniaco, Mosco de la Merced and Psicosis) ended in a double countout	Eight-man "Atómicos" tag team match
3	Octagón defeated Hong Kong Lee, Máscara Sagrada Jr. and Fuerza Guerrera	1st Round four-way match in the Rey de Reyes tournament
4	Latin Lover defeated Blue Demon Jr., Black Demon and Killer	1st Round four-way match in the Rey de Reyes tournament
5	Cibernético defeated Shiiba, Perro Aguayo Jr. and Máscara Ságrada	1st Round four-way match in the Rey de Reyes tournament
6	Perro Aguayo defeated Electroshock, La Parka Jr. and El Cobarde II	1st Round four-way match in the Rey de Reyes tournament
7	Antonio and Jorge Brennan defeated Abismo Negro and Pentagón by disqualification	Steel Cage match
8	Perro Aguayo defeated Latin Lover, Cibernético and Octagón	Four-way elimination match in the Rey de Reyes tournament final

=== Tournament bracket ===
1st Round; Rey de Reyes; March 1, 1998
El Cobarde II	—
Electroshock	—
La Parka Jr.	—
Perro Aguayo	Win
Black Demon	—
Blue Demon Jr.	—
Latin Lover	Win
Killer	—
Cibernético	Win
El Alebrije	—
Perro Aguayo Jr.	—
Shiiba	—
Fuerza Guerrera	—
Hong Kong Lee	—
Máscara Sagrada Jr.	—
Octagón	Win

Final; Rey de Reyes; March 1, 1998
Perro Aguayo	—
Latin Lover	8:37
Cibernético	—
Octagón	Win (Note: This was a four-way elimination match. Order of elimination: Cibernético and Perro Aguayo via double countout, Latin Lover)
