= Rey de Reyes (2002) =

2002 Lucha Libre AAA World Wide event

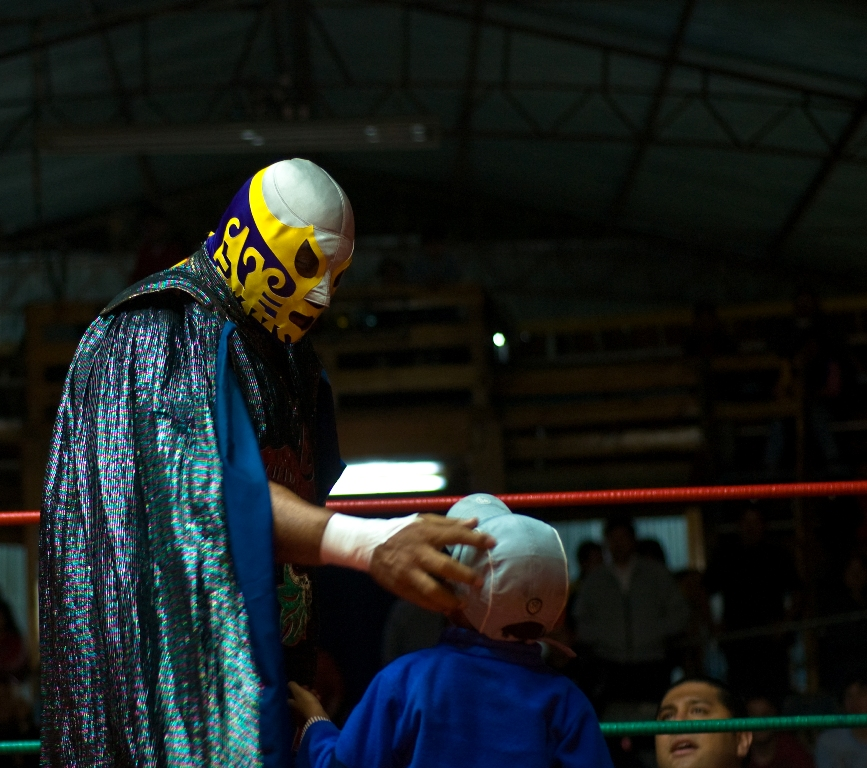
- Canek, won the 2002 Rey de Reyes tournament
- Promotion: AAA
- Date: March 17, 2002
- City: Zapopan, Jalisco, Mexico
- Venue: Auditorio Benito Juarez de Zapopan

Event chronology
← Previous; Guerra de Titanes	Next → Triplemanía X

Rey de Reyes chronology
← Previous; 2001	Next → 2003

The Rey de Reyes 2002 (Spanish for "King of Kings") was the sixth annual Rey de Reyes professional wrestling tournament and show, produced by the Mexican wrestling promotion AAA. The event took place on March 17, 2002, at the Auditorio Benito Juarez de Zapopan in Zapopan, Jalisco, Mexico. The tournament consisted of a semi-final round of four four-man elimination matches and a final match with the winners of each of the semi-finals facing off in an elimination match until only one man remained. The final of the 2002 tournament pitted Canek, Pirata Morgan, Cibernético and Octagón against each other. The show featured two additional matches beyond the five tournament matches.

== Production ==
=== Background ===
Starting in 1997 and every year since then the Mexican Lucha Libre, or professional wrestling, company AAA has held a Rey de Reyes (Spanish for "King of Kings') show in the spring. The 1997 version was held in February, while all subsequent Rey de Reyes shows were held in March. As part of their annual Rey de Reyes event AAA holds the eponymious 'ey de Reyes tournament to determine that specific year's Rey. Most years the show hosts both the qualifying round and the final match, but on occasion the qualifying matches have been held prior to the event as part of AAA's weekly television shows. The traditional format consists of four preliminary rounds, each a Four-man elimination match with each of the four winners face off in the tournament finals, again under elimination rules. There have been years where AAA has employed a different format to determine a winner. The winner of the Rey de Reyes tournament is given a large ornamental sword to symbolize their victory, but is normally not guaranteed any other rewards for winning the tournament, although some years becoming the Rey de Reyes has earned the winner a match for the AAA Mega Championship. From 1999 through 2009 AAA also held an annual Reina de Reinas ("Queen of Queens") tournament, but later turned that into an actual championship that could be defended at any point during the year, abandoning the annual tournament concept. The 2002 show was the sixth Rey de Reyes show in the series.

=== Storylines ===
The Rey de Reyes show featured five professional wrestling matches with different wrestlers involved in pre-existing, scripted feuds, plots, and storylines. Wrestlers were portrayed as either heels (referred to as rudos in Mexico, those that portray the "bad guys") or faces (técnicos in Mexico, the "good guy" characters) as they followed a series of tension-building events, which culminated in a wrestling match or series of matches.

== Results ==
No.	Results	Stipulations
1	Canek defeated El Picudo, Septiembre Negro and El Hijo del Solitario	Rey de Reyes 2002 Semi-final elimination match
2	Pirata Morgan defeated Gronda, Zandokan and Pimpinela Escarlata	Rey de Reyes 2002 Semi-final elimination match
3	Cibernético defeated Dos Caras, El Oriental and El Texano	Rey de Reyes 2002 Semi-final elimination match
4	Octagón defeated Pentagón, Máscara Ságrada and Máscara Maligna	Rey de Reyes 2002 Semi-final elimination match
5	Mascarita Sagrada and Octagoncito defeated Mascarita Maligna and Mini Abismo Negro	Tag team match
6	Abismo Negro, Chessman, Electroshock and Monsther defeated El Alebrije, La Parka Jr., Mr. Águila and El Zorro	Eight-man tag team match
7	Canek defeated Pirata Morgan, Cibernético and Octagón	Rey de Reyes 2002 Final elimination match

=== Tournament bracket ===
1st Round; Sin Limite: Rey de Reyes; March 17, 2002 (Aired: March 31)
Mascara Maligna	—
Máscara Sagrada	—
Octagón	Win
Pentagón	—
Cibernético	Win
Dos Caras	—
El Oriental	—
El Texano	—
Gronda	—
Loco Zandokan	—
Pimpinela Escarlata	—
Pirata Morgan	Win
El Canek	Win
El Hijo del Solitario	—
Picudo	—
Septiembre Negro	—

Final; Sin Limite: Rey de Reyes; March 17, 2002 (Aired: March 31)
Octagón	—
Cibernético	—
Pirata Morgan	—
El Canek	Win
