= Triplemanía XII =

2004 Lucha Libre AAA World Wide event

- Triplemanía XII main event wrestlers Cibernético (left) and La Parka (right)
- Promotion: AAA
- Date: June 20, 2004
- City: Naucalpan, Mexico
- Venue: El Toreo
- Attendance: 18,988

Pay-per-view chronology
| ← Previous; Rey de Reyes | Next → Verano de Escándalo |

Triplemanía chronology
| ← Previous; XI | Next → XIII |

Triplemanía XII was the twelfth Triplemanía professional wrestling show promoted by AAA. The show took place on June 20, 2004 in Naucalpan, Mexico like the previous year’s event. The Main event featured a Lucha de Apuestas "Mask vs. mask" match between La Parka and Cibernético.

== Production ==
=== Background ===
In early 1992 Antonio Peña was working as a booker and storyline writer for Consejo Mundial de Lucha Libre (CMLL), Mexico's largest and the world's oldest wrestling promotion, and was frustrated by CMLL's very conservative approach to professional wrestling, specifically the style of wrestling known as Lucha Libre (Spanish for "freestyle wrestling"). He joined forced with a number of younger, very talented wrestlers who felt like CMLL was not giving them the recognition they deserved and decided to split from CMLL to create Asistencia Asesoría y Administración, later known simply as "AAA" or Triple A. After making a deal with the Televisa television network AAA held their first show in April 1992. The following year Peña and AAA held their first Triplemanía event, building it into an annual event that would become AAA's Super Bowl event, similar to the WWE's WrestleMania being the biggest show of the year. The 2004 Triplemanía was the 12th year in a row AAA held a Triplemanía show and the 17th overall show under the Triplemanía banner.

=== Storylines ===
The Triplemanía XII show featured six professional wrestling matches with different wrestlers involved in pre-existing scripted feuds, plots and storylines. Wrestlers were portrayed as either heels (referred to as rudos in Mexico, those that portray the "bad guys") or faces (técnicos in Mexico, the "good guy" characters) as they followed a series of tension-building events, which culminated in a wrestling match or series of matches.

== Results ==
| No. | Results | Stipulations |
|---|---|---|
| 1 | Óscar Sevilla, Pimpinela Escarlata, Cinthia Moreno and Mascarita Sagrada defeated Gran Apache, Polvo de Estrellas, Faby Apache and Mini Abismo Negro | Relevos Atómicos de Locura match |
| 2 | Octagón, Heavy Metal and El Intocable defeated Pirata Morgan, MS-1 and Espectro, Jr. via DQ | Best two-out-of-three falls six-man "Lucha Libre rules" tag team match |
| 3 | Mr. Águila defeated El Zorro (c) | Singles match for the UWA World Light Heavyweight Championship and the Mexican National Heavyweight Championship |
| 4 | Latin Lover, Héctor Garza and Gronda defeated Abyss, Chessman and Abismo Negro | Best two-out-of-three falls six-man "Lucha Libre rules" tag team match |
| 5 | Charly Manson defeated Electroshock by pinfall After Electroshock lost the match his wife, Lady Apache, convinced Charly Manson not to make Electroshock retire in return she would shave off her hair. Afterwards Electroshock also shaved his own hair in sympathy with his wife’s sacrifice. | Singles "Retirement" match. |
| 6 | La Parka defeated Cibernético by pinfall | Best two-out-of-three falls Lucha de Apuestas "Mask vs. Mask" match |
(c) / – the champion(s) heading into the match
