= Rey de Reyes (1999) =

1999 Lucha Libre AAA World Wide event

- Official logo of the Rey de Reyes broadcast
- Promotion: AAA
- Date: March 7, 1999
- City: Naucalpan, Mexico State, Mexico
- Venue: Toreo de Cuatro Caminos

Event chronology
← Previous; Guerra de Titanes	Next → Triplemanía VII

Rey de Reyes chronology
← Previous; 1998	Next → 2000

The Rey de Reyes 1999 (Spanish for "King of Kings") was the third annual Rey de Reyes professional wrestling tournament and show, produced by the Mexican wrestling promotion AAA. The event took place on March 7, 1999 in the Toreo de Cuatro Caminos arena in Naucalpan, Mexico State, Mexico. The Rey de Reyes tournament consisted of a semi-final round of four four-man elimination matches and a final match with the winners of each of the semi-finals facing off in an elimination match until one man remained. The final of the 1999 Rey de Reyes tournament pitted Cibernético, Octagón, Latin Lover and Electroshock against each other. Besides the five tournament matches the show featured an additional four matches including a match for the Mexican National Atómicos Championship between Los Vatos Locos and Los Vipers and a Lucha de Apuesta match between three men who all risked their hair, Perro Aguayo, Sangre Chicana and El Cobarde.

== Production ==
=== Background ===
Starting in 1997 and every year since then the Mexican Lucha Libre, or professional wrestling, company AAA has held a Rey de Reyes (Spanish for "King of Kings') show in the spring. The 1997 version was held in February, while all subsequent Rey de Reyes shows were held in March. As part of their annual Rey de Reyes event AAA holds the eponymious Rey de Reyes tournament to determine that specific year's Rey. Most years the show hosts both the qualifying round and the final match, but on occasion the qualifying matches have been held prior to the event as part of AAA's weekly television shows. The traditional format consists of four preliminary rounds, each a Four-man elimination match with each of the four winners face off in the tournament finals, again under elimination rules. There have been years where AAA has employed a different format to determine a winner. The winner of the Rey de Reyes tournament is given a large ornamental sword to symbolize their victory, but is normally not guaranteed any other rewards for winning the tournament, although some years becoming the Rey de Reyes has earned the winner a match for the AAA Mega Championship. From 1999 through 2009 AAA also held an annual Reina de Reinas ("Queen of Queens") tournament, but later turned that into an actual championship that could be defended at any point during the year, abandoning the annual tournament concept. The 1999 show was the third Rey de Reyes show in the series.

=== Storylines ===
The Rey de Reyes show featured nine professional wrestling matches with different wrestlers involved in pre-existing, scripted feuds, plots, and storylines. Wrestlers were portrayed as either heels (referred to as rudos in Mexico, those that portray the "bad guys") or faces (técnicos in Mexico, the "good guy" characters) as they followed a series of tension-building events, which culminated in a wrestling match or series of matches.

== Results ==
No.	Results	Stipulations
1	Alda Moreno, Esther Moreno and Rossy Moreno defeated La Migala, Miss Janeth and Xóchitl Hamada	Six-man "Lucha Libre rules" tag team match
2	Los Vatos Locos (Charly Manson, May Flowers, Nygma and El Picudo) (c) defeated Los Vipers (Histeria, Maniaco, Mosco de la Merced and Psicosis)	Eight-man "Atómicos" tag team match for the Mexican National Atómicos Championship
3	Octagón defeated Espectro Jr., El Alebrije and El Hijo del Solitario	Four-way match in the 1st Round of the Rey de Reyes tournament
4	Cibernético defeated Abismo Negro, Dos Caras and Máscara Sagrada	Four-way match in the 1st Round of the Rey de Reyes tournament
5	Latin Lover defeated Gran Apache, the Panther and Oscar Sevilla	Four-way match in the 1st Round of the Rey de Reyes tournament
6	Electroshock defeated Canek, Blue Demon Jr. and Pentagón	Four-way match in the 1st Round of the Rey de Reyes tournament
7	Antonio Silva, Carlos Gutierrez, Kick Boxer and Thai Boxer defeated Heavy Metal, La Parka Jr., Máscara Sagrada Jr. and Perro Aguayo Jr.	Eight-man Steel Cage match
8	Cibernético defeated Octagón, Latin Lover and Electroshock	Four-way match in the Rey de Reyes tournament final
9	Perro Aguayo and Sangre Chicana defeated El Cobarde II	Lucha de Apuesta, three-way "Hair vs. Hair" Bull Terrier Match
(c) / – the champion(s) heading into the match

=== Tournament bracket ===
1st Round; Rey de Reyes; March 7, 1999
El Alebrije	—
El Hijo del Solitario	—
Espectro Jr.	—
Octagón	Win
Abismo Negro	—
Cibernético	Win
Dos Caras	—
Máscara Sagrada	—
Gran Apache	—
Latin Lover	Win
Oscar Sevilla	—
The Panther	—
Blue Demon Jr.	—
Canek	—
Electroshock	Win
Pentagón	—

Final; Rey de Reyes; March 7, 1999
Octagón	—
Cibernético	Win
Latin Lover	—
Electroshock	—
