= Garra Negra =

Mexican professional wrestler (born 1999)

Personal information
- Born: August 4, 1999 (age 26) Mexicali, Baja California, Mexico
- Family: El Traidor (father); Gatubela (mother)

Professional wrestling career
- Ring name(s): Sexy Star (II); La Hija de Gatubela; Gatubela Jr. La Gatubela; Picadura Letal; Garra Negra
- Billed height: 1.63 m (5 ft 4 in)
- Billed weight: 71 kg (157 lb)
- Trained by: Tapatío Jr.; Black Shadow Jr.; Príncipe Negro; Mr. Tempest
- Debut: July 10, 2016

Garra Negra (born August 4, 1999) is the ring name of a Mexican professional wrestler.

Garra Negra has also previously worked as Sexy Star, (Note: Also called Sexy Star II to distinguish her from the original Sexy Star.) Picadura Letal, and La Hija de Gatubela. Her real name is not a matter of public record, as is often the case with masked wrestlers in Mexico where their private lives are kept a secret from the wrestling fans.

== Professional wrestling career ==
La Hija de Gatubela was trained by Tapatío Jr., Black Shadow Jr., Príncipe Negro and Mr. Tempest and debuted in July 2016 in her hometown of Mexicali, Baja California. After several years on the independent scene, she signed with Kaoz Lucha Libre in January 2021. In May of the same year, she debuted in Lucha Libre AAA Worldwide at their Rey de Reyes pay-per-view event under the ring name Sexy Star, which previously belonged to another wrestler of the same name. Her contract with AAA is not exclusive, and she continues to wrestle on the independent scene, including in the United States. In January 2022, Sexy Star won The Crash Women's Championship. At Triplemanía XXX in Monterrey in August of the same year, she challenged for the mixed titles alongside Komander, but lost to Sammy Guevara and Tay Conti. On February 5, 2023, at Rey de Reyes, she won the five-woman Reina de Reinas match. In October 2024, she left AAA.

After leaving AAA, she returned to the independent circuit under her previous name, La Hija de Gatubela.

In February 2026, Gatubela alongside fellow former AAA luchadora and frequent tag partner Keyra were announced to be making their debut for CMLL with Gatubela using the new name Garra Negra.

== Personal life ==
Garra Negra's mother wrestled under the name Gatubela, and her father wrestled under the name El Traidor. She is in a relationship with fellow luchador Séptimo Dragón.

== Championships and accomplishments ==
- New Tradition Lucha Libre
  - New Tradition Lucha Libre Women's Championship (1 time)
- The Crash Lucha Libre
  - The Crash Women's Championship (1 time)
- Kaoz Lucha Libre
  - Kaoz Women's Tag Team Championship (1 time, current) – with Black Widow
- Lucha Libre AAA Worldwide
  - Reina de Reinas (2023)
