= Groon XXX =

Mexican professional wrestler

Personal information
- Born: January 11, 1980 (age 46) Tijuana, Baja California, Mexico
- Spouse: Johana Bautista (actual spouse)
- Family: Ogun (brother)

Professional wrestling career
- Ring name(s): Gran Master; Gronda; Groond XXX; Gronda XXX; Groon XXX
- Billed height: 183 cm (6 ft 0 in)
- Billed weight: 115 kg (254 lb)
- Trained by: Humberto Garza; Mario Segura
- Debut: November 11, 2001

Groon XXX (born January 11, 1980, in Tijuana, Baja California, Mexico) is the ring name of a Mexican professional wrestler. He has previously wrestled as El Gronda, Gronda XXX, Groond XXX and Gran Masther and has worked for Mexico's two largest wrestling promotions AAA and Consejo Mundial de Lucha Libre (CMLL) and currently works on the Mexican Independent Circuit. Groon XXX's real name is not a matter of public record, as is often the case with masked wrestlers in Mexico where their private lives are kept a secret from the wrestling fans. He is a trained nutritionist, fitness trainer and owner of his own gym in Mexico.

== Professional wrestling career ==
The wrestler later known as Groon XXX made his professional wrestling debut on November 11, 2001, under the ring name Gran Master.

=== Gronda (2002–2005) ===
Not long after his debut AAA gave him a new name, El Gronda, and a new look including a wrestling mask that resembled that of a demon, complete with horns, pointy ears and false fangs. His mask was one of the first professional wrestling masks to be primarily latex instead of fabric, allowing the mask to be molded to resemble the face of a demon. His muscular physique would be enhanced with red and black body paint, outlining various muscles in red and black to give him a "supernatural" look. His first major match for AAA took place on March 30, 2002, at AAA's annual Rey de Reyes ("King of Kings") show. Gronda, Zandokan and Pimpinela Escarlata lost to Pirata Morgan in the first round of the annual Rey de Reyes tournament. A few months later he teamed up with El Zorro, Máscara Sagrada and Mr. Águila defeated Abismo Negro, El Canek, Headhunter A and Máscara Maligna in a Steel cage match. At Triplemanía X El Gronda, Latin Lover, La Parka and El Alebrije defeated Abismo Negro, Leatherface, Cibernético and Monster in an eight-man "Atómicos" tag team match. At the 2003 Verano de Escándalo show Gronda laid out a "$3,000 challenge" with the storyline being that Gonda put up 3,000 US dollars to anyone who could defeat him. Gronda wrestled and defeated Charly Manson, Chessman and Hator in back to back matches. Gronda continued to feud with Los Vipers after defeating members Manson and Chessman, leading to Gronda, La Parka and Octagón defeating Abismo Negro, Chessman and Cibernético) as part of the 2003 Guerra de Titanes show. The storyline continued until Triplemanía XII where Gronda, Latin Lover and Héctor Garza defeated Chessman, Abismo Negro and Abyss in one of the featured bouts of the show. In 2005 Gronda left AAA, after which the promotion introduced a second Gronda character to take over from the original.

=== Groon XXX (2005–Present) ===
With AAA officially owning the trademark for the name Gronda he modified his name to "Groon XXX", sometimes also billed as "Groond XXX" or even "Gronda XXX" as he worked on the Mexican independent circuit. A few months after leaving AAA Groon XXX began working for Consejo Mundial de Lucha Libre (CMLL), AAA's biggest rival in Mexico. The biggest match of his six month stay in CMLL was on September 29, 2006, as he. Dos Caras Jr. and Dr. Wagner Jr. defeated Emilio Charles Jr., Máscara Año 2000 and Olímpico on the CMLL 73rd Anniversary Show. In 2009 he returned to AAA, billed as Groon XXX to start a feud with Gronda II. The two were on opposite sides for Groon XXX's first match back as Groon XXX and La Hermandad 187 (Joe Líder and Nicho el Milionario) defeated Gronda, El Elegido and Jack Evans. Three weeks later Groon XXX and La Hermandad 187 defeated Gronda, El Elegido and Decnnis in a steel cage match on the Héroes Inmortales III show. Following the match Groon XXX left AAA once again, opting to work primarily for Promociones Perros del Mal.

In 2011 he announced his retirement from wrestling, opening a gym in Nezahualcoyotl. It was rumored that he would return to CMLL for their CMLL 79th Anniversary Show, but a deal was never worked out. While he did not work for CMLL he has worked a limited number of matches since 2012, working for promotions such as International Wrestling Revolution Group (IWRG), Federacion Universal de Lucha Libre (FULL) and others.
