= Poliforum Zamna =

Arena in Merida, Yucatan, Mexico

Poliforum Zamna is a 6,640-seat indoor multipurpose arena located in Merida, Yucatan, part of the Unidad Deportiva Kukulkan complex which also includes Estadios Carlos Iturralde and Kukulkan, the latter from which the arena's red coffered dome roof is viewable. All three venues were built during the 1980s; the Poliforum itself was built sometime in the mid-1980s, and when completed, it could hold as many as 12,000 spectators. Subsequent renovations, including the replacement of the original 1980s-style seating with wider and more comfortable seats, as well as improved handicapped access, have reduced the arena's maximum capacity for concerts, boxing and wrestling to 8,640. Another renovation to the arena took place in 2014, and saw its domed roof repainted white, and its exterior modernized. In that same renovation, a new scoreboard was installed and new LED lighting replaced older lighting.

In addition to the aforementioned events, the Poliforum Zamna is also used for rodeos, basketball, ice events including ice shows and hockey, and circuses, among other events. The arena now competes with the Yucatan Siglo XXI Convention Centre for large-scale indoor events. Rocio Durcal, Timbiriche, Vicente Fernandez, Gloria Trevi, Veronica Castro, Maribel Guardia, Pepe Aguilar, Mana, Thalia, Lorena Herrera, Banda el Recodo and many others have performed here in its over 30-year history.
