= List of major Lucha Libre AAA Worldwide events =

List of major events produced by Lucha Libre AAA Worldwide

Lucha Libre AAA Worldwide is a Mexican professional wrestling promotion founded in 1992 by Antonio Peña as Asistencia Asesoría y Administración (AAA). Since its founding, the promotion has held numerous notable professional wrestling events, with the events often shown on pay-per-view or on television and streaming services via AAA's broadcast partners. The events feature professional wrestling matches that result from scripted storylines, where wrestlers portray heels (referred to as rudos in lucha libre), faces (referred to as técnicos in lucha libre), or less distinguishable characters in scripted events that build tension and culminate in a wrestling match or series of matches.

== 1990s ==
=== 1993 ===
Date	Event	Location	Venue	Attendance	Main event	Notes	Ref
April 30	Triplemanía I	Mexico City	Plaza de Toros	48,000–50,000	Cien Caras vs. Konnan in a 2-out-of-3 Falls retirement match	—N/a	
August 28	La Revancha	Los Angeles, California, U.S.	Los Angeles Memorial Sports Arena	16,742	Cien Caras vs. Jake Roberts vs. Konnan	—N/a	
November 12	La Lucha del Honor	Los Angeles, California, U.S.	Los Angeles Memorial Sports Arena	12,500	Blue Panther, Konnan and Perro Aguayo vs. Eddie Guerrero, Jake Roberts and The Love Machine	—N/a	

=== 1994 ===
Date	Event	Location	Venue	Attendance	Main event	Notes	Ref
April 26	Triplemanía II-A	Aguascalientes, Aguascalientes	Plaza de Toros "La Monumental"	9,500	Heavy Metal vs. Jerry Estrada in a Hair vs. Hair match	—N/a	
May 15	Triplemanía II-B	Zapopan, Jalisco	Auditorio Benito Juárez	11,200	Konnan, Perro Aguayo, and Cien Caras vs. Jake Roberts, Love Machine, and Miguel Pérez Jr. in a 2-out-of-3 Falls match	—N/a	
May 27	Triplemanía II-C	Tijuana, Baja California	El Toreo	18,000	Konnan vs. Jake Roberts in a 2-out-of-3 Falls Hair vs. Hair match	—N/a	
August 6	Noche de Campeones	Los Angeles, California, U.S.	Los Angeles Memorial Sports Arena	8,000	Espectrito vs. Mascarita Sagrada in a Mask vs. Mask match	—N/a	
November 6	When Worlds Collide	Los Angeles, California, U.S.	Los Angeles Memorial Sports Arena	13,000	Perro Aguayo vs. Konnan in a Steel Cage match	Co-produced with WCW	
November 16	Lucha World	Yatsushiro, Japan	City General Gymnasium	1,500	El Samurai, Psicosis, and The Great Sasuke vs. Blue Panther, Konnan, and La Parka	Co-produced with NJPW	
November 17	Lucha World	Sasebo, Japan	Sasebo Gymnasium Cultural Hall	2,000	El Hijo del Santo, El Mexicano, and El Samurai vs. Blue Panther, Gran Hamada, and La Parka	Co-produced with NJPW	
November 18	Lucha World	Hiroshima, Japan	Hiroshima Green Arena	4,000	Shinjiro Otani vs. The Great Sasuke	Co-produced with NJPW	
November 19	Lucha World	Yamaguchi, Japan	Yamaguchi Prefectural Gymnasium	2,200	Shinjiro Otani and Wild Pegasus vs. Konnan and Psicosis	Co-produced with NJPW	
November 21	Lucha World	Fukuoka, Japan	Hakata Starlanes	2,250	El Samurai, Gran Hamada, Shinjiro Otani, and The Great Sasuke vs. El Hijo del Santo, El Mexicano, Máscara Sagrada, and Perro Aguayo	Co-produced with NJPW	

=== 1995 ===
Date	Event	Location	Venue	Attendance	Main event	Notes	Ref
June 10	Triplemanía III-A	Orizaba, Veracruz	Plaza de Toros de la Concordia	14,000	13-Mini-Estrellas Steel Cage Mask vs. Mask match	—N/a	
June 18	Triplemanía III-B	Tonalá, Jalisco	Río Nilo Coliseum	19,500	Winners vs. Marabunta in a two-out-of-three falls mask vs. mask match	—N/a	
June 30	Triplemanía III-C	Ciudad Madero, Tamaulipas	Convention Center Ciudad Madero	16,300	Super Caló vs. Winners in a 2-out-of-3 Falls Mask vs. Mask match	—N/a	

=== 1996 ===
Date	Event	Location	Venue	Attendance	Main event	Notes	Ref
May 11	Triplemanía IV-A	Chicago, Illinois, U.S.	International Amphitheatre	2,676	Konnan and Perro Aguayo vs. Pierroth Jr. and Cien Caras in a Lumberjack match	—N/a	
June 1	World Wrestling Peace Festival	Los Angeles, California, U.S.	Los Angeles Sports Arena	5,964	Antonio Inoki and Dan Severn vs. Yoshiaki Fujiwara and Oleg Taktarov	Co-produced with AJW, CMLL, MPW, NWA, NJPW, PWFG, and WCW	
June 15	Triplemanía IV-B	Orizaba, Veracruz	Orizaba Bullring	7,000	La Parka, Octagón, and Máscara Sagrada vs. Killer, Cien Caras, and Heavy Metal in a Lumberjack match	—N/a	
July 15	Triplemanía IV-C	Ciudad Madero, Tamaulipas	Convention Center Ciudad Madero	12,000	Los Payasos (Coco Rojo, Coco Verde and Coco Amarillo) and Karis la Momia vs. Los Junior Atómicos (Halcón Dorado Jr., Máscara Sagrada Jr., Tinieblas Jr., and Blue Demon Jr.) in a Steel Cage Mask vs. Mask match	—N/a	

=== 1997 ===
Date	Event	Location	Venue	Attendance	Main event	Notes	Ref
February 21	Rey de Reyes	Ciudad Madero, Tamaulipas	Convention Center Ciudad Madero	—N/a	Latin Lover vs. Heavy Metal vs. Héctor Garza vs. Octagón in the Rey de Reyes tournament final	—N/a	
June 13	Triplemanía V-A	Tijuana, Baja California	Plaza de Toros	6,000	Perro Aguayo, Tinieblas Jr. and Canek vs. Jake Roberts, Killer, and Gorgeous George III in a 2-out-of-3 Falls match	—N/a	
June 15	Triplemanía V-B	Naucalpan	El Toreo	—N/a	Perro Aguayo, Octagón, Cibernético and Canek vs. Jake Roberts, Gorgeous George III, El Cobarde Jr. and Fuerza Guerrera	—N/a	
September 14	Verano de Escándalo	Tonalá, Jalisco	Río Nilo Coliseum	18,500	Perro Aguayo, Perro Aguayo Jr. and Heavy Metal vs. Sangre Chicano, El Picudo and El Cobarde II in a Steel Cage Mask vs. Hair match	—N/a	
December 13	Guerra de Titanes	Ciudad Madero, Tamaulipas	Convention Center Ciudad Madero	11,000	Heavy Metal and Perro Aguayo vs. Picudo and Sangre Chicana in a Steel Cage Hair vs. Hair match	—N/a	

=== 1998 ===
Date	Event	Location	Venue	Attendance	Main event	Notes	Ref
March 1	Rey de Reyes	Naucalpan	Toreo de Cuatro Caminos	—N/a	Perro Aguayo vs. Latin Lover vs. Cibernético vs. Octagón in the Rey de Reyes tournament final	—N/a	
June 7	Triplemanía VI	Chihuahua	Gymnasio Manual Bernardo Aguirre	—N/a	Kick Boxer vs. Heavy Metal in a Steel Cage Hair vs. Hair match	—N/a	
September 18	Verano de Escándalo	Ciudad Madero, Tamaulipas	—N/a	12,000	Heavy Metal and Blue Demon Jr. vs. Kick Boxer and Abismo Negro in a Steel Cage match	—N/a	
December 13	Guerra de Titanes	Chihuahua	Aguirre Gym	8,000	Octagón and Heavy Metal vs. Pentagón and Kick Boxer in a Steel Cage match	—N/a	

=== 1999 ===
Date	Event	Location	Venue	Attendance	Main event	Notes	Ref
March 7	Rey de Reyes	Naucalpan	Toreo de Cuatro Caminos	—N/a	Perro Aguayo vs. Sangre Chicana vs. El Cobarde II in a Bull Terrier Hair vs. Hair match	—N/a	
June 11	Triplemanía VII	Ciudad Madero, Tamaulipas	Convention Center Ciudad Madero	13,000	Perro Aguayo, Octagón, and El Cobarde II vs. El Texano, Perro Aguayo Jr., and Sangre Chicana in a 2-out-of-3 Falls match	—N/a	
September 17	Verano de Escándalo	Mexico City	Juan de la Barrera Gym	4,021	Heavy Metal and Octagón vs. Jaque Mate and Kick Boxer in a Steel Cage Mask vs. Hair match	—N/a	
December 10	Guerra de Titanes	Ciudad Madero, Tamaulipas	Convention Center Ciudad Madero	13,000	Octagón vs. Jaque Mate in a Mask vs. Mask Street Fight	—N/a	

== 2000s ==
=== 2000 ===
Date	Event	Location	Venue	Attendance	Main event	Notes	Ref
March 5	Rey de Reyes	Naucalpan	Toreo de Cuatro Caminos	18,000	La Parka Jr. vs. Gigante Drako in a Mask vs. Mask match	—N/a	
June 17	Padrisimo	Ciudad Madero, Tamaulipas	La Plaza de Toros	—N/a	Abismo Negro, Cibernético, Pierroth Jr. and Shocker vs. Brazo de Plata, La Parka Jr., Octagón and Rayo de Jalisco Jr.	Co-produced with CMLL	
July 5	Triplemanía VIII	Tokyo, Japan	Korakuen Hall	1,700	Octagón, Jushin Thunder Liger, Latin Lover, and Hector Garza vs. Cibernético, Cima, Abismo Negro, and Electroshock	—N/a	
September 29	Verano de Escándalo	Ciudad Madero, Tamaulipas	—N/a	—N/a	Heavy Metal and Perro Aguayo Jr. vs. Latin Lover and Héctor Garza	—N/a	
December 8	Guerra de Titanes	Ciudad Madero, Tamaulipas	Convention Center Ciudad Madero	13,500	Héctor Garza and Latin Lover vs. Heavy Metal and Perro Aguayo Jr. in a Steel Cage match	—N/a	

=== 2001 ===
Date	Event	Location	Venue	Attendance	Main event	Notes	Ref
March 30	Rey de Reyes	Ciudad Madero, Tamaulipas	Convention Center Ciudad Madero	—N/a	La Parka Jr. vs. Latin Lover vs. Abismo Negro vs. Heavy Metal in the Rey de Reyes tournament final	—N/a	
May 26	Triplemanía IX	Mexico City	Plaza de Toros	10,000	Pirata Morgan vs. Sangre Chicana vs. El Cobarde II in a Dog Collar Hair vs. Hair match	—N/a	
September 16	Verano de Escándalo	Naucalpan	El Toreo	18,000	Canek, Zorro, Latin Lover, and Heavy Metal vs. Cibernético, Headhunter I, Electroshock, and Abismo Negro	—N/a	
November 23	Guerra de Titanes	Mexico City	Plaza de Toros	15,000	Heavy Metal vs. Perro Aguayo Jr. vs. Héctor Garza vs. Latin Lover in a Hair vs. Hair match	—N/a	

=== 2002 ===
Date	Event	Location	Venue	Attendance	Main event	Notes	Ref
March 17	Rey de Reyes	Zapopan, Jalisco	—N/a	—N/a	Canek vs. Pirata Morgan vs. Cibernético vs. Octagón in the Rey de Reyes tournament final	—N/a	
July 5	Triplemanía X	Ciudad Madero, Tamaulipas	Convention Center Ciudad Madero	—N/a	Pentagón vs. Octagón in a Mask vs. Mask match	—N/a	
September 16	Verano de Escándalo	Naucalpan	El Toreo	—N/a	El Dandy vs. Electroshock vs. El Zorro vs. Perro Aguayo Jr. in a Hair vs. Hair match	—N/a	
November 15	Guerra de Titanes	Veracruz	El Toreo	11,500	El Alebrije, Máscara Sagráda, La Parka Jr., and Octagón vs. Lucha Libre Latina (Abismo Negro, Cibernético, The Monsther, and Leatherface)	—N/a	

=== 2003 ===
Date	Event	Location	Venue	Attendance	Main event	Notes	Ref
March 16	Rey de Reyes	Zapopan, Jalisco	—N/a	—N/a	La Parka vs. Abismo Negro in the Rey de Reyes tournament final	—N/a	
June 15	Triplemanía XI	Naucalpan	El Toreo	15,000	Lizmark, La Parka, Octagón and Super Caló vs. Abismo Negro, Cibernético and The Headhunters (Headhunter A and Headhunter B) in a 2-out-of-3 Falls match	—N/a	
August 31	Verano de Escándalo-A	Monterrey, Nuevo León	Arena Solidaridad	—N/a	La Parka and Latin Lover vs. Cibernético and Héctor Garza	—N/a	
September 16	Verano de Escándalo-B	San Luis Potosí, San Luis Potosí	Arena Miguel Barragán	—N/a	La Parka, Latin Lover and Máscara Sagrada vs. Cibernético, Héctor Garza and Juventud Guerrera	—N/a	
September 28	Verano de Escándalo-C	Guadalajara, Jalisco	El Coliseo de Universidad de Guadalajara	—N/a	La Parka vs. Cibernético in a Street Fight	—N/a	
November 30	Guerra de Titanes	Naucalpan	El Toreo	18,000	Latin Lover and Michael Shane vs. David Young and Mr. Águila in the Televisa Tag Team Tournament final	—N/a	

=== 2004 ===
Date	Event	Location	Venue	Attendance	Main event	Notes	Ref
March 5	Rey de Reyes	Naucalpan	Toreo de Cuatro Caminos	—N/a	Jeff Jarrett vs. Latin Lover for the Rey de Reyes trophy	—N/a	
June 20	Triplemanía XII	Naucalpan	El Toreo	18,988	La Parka vs. Cibernético in a 2-out-of-3 Falls Mask vs. Mask match	—N/a	
October 16	Verano de Escándalo	Orizaba, Veracruz	—N/a	8,000	Heavy Metal, El Intocable and Zorro vs. Los Vipers (Histeria, Mosco de la Merced and Psicosis) in a steel cage Mask vs. Hair match	—N/a	
December 5	Guerra de Titanes	Naucalpan	El Toreo	18,500	Cibernético and La Parka vs. La Legión Extranjera (Konnan and Rikishi)	—N/a	

=== 2005 ===
Date	Event	Location	Venue	Attendance	Main event	Notes	Ref
March 11	Rey de Reyes	Ciudad Madero, Tamaulipas	Convention Center Ciudad Madero	—N/a	La Parka vs. Latin Lover vs. Abismo Negro vs. Chessman vs. Jeff Jarrett vs. Konnan vs. Cibernético for the Rey de Reyes trophy	—N/a	
June 20	Triplemanía XIII	Guadalajara, Jalisco	Plaza de Toros	22,129	Latin Lover, La Parka and Octagón vs. Los Hell Brothers (Chessman and Cibernético) and Fuerza Guerrera in a 2-out-of-3 Falls match	—N/a	
September 18	Verano de Escándalo	Naucalpan	El Toreo	15,000	Chessman vs. Cibernético vs. Shocker vs. Latin Lover in an Electrified Steel Cage Hair vs. Hair match	—N/a	
December 10	Guerra de Titanes	Guadalajara, Jalisco	Plaza de Toros Nuevo Progreso	14,000	Abismo Negro, Latin Lover and La Parka vs. La Secta Cibernetica (Cibernético, Dark Cuervo and Dark Escoria)	—N/a	

=== 2006 ===
Date	Event	Location	Venue	Attendance	Main event	Notes	Ref
March 10	Rey de Reyes	Ciudad Madero, Tamaulipas	Convention Center Ciudad Madero	18,000	Team AAA (La Parka, Octagón and Vampiro) vs. La Secta Cibernetica (Chessman, Cibernético and Muerte Cibernetica) vs. Team TNA (Konnan, Ron Killings and Samoa Joe) vs. Los Guapos (Scorpio Jr., Shocker and Zumbido) for the Rey de Reyes trophy	—N/a	
June 18	Triplemanía XIV	Naucalpan	El Toreo	18,000	La Parka vs. Muerte Cibernética in a Mask vs. Mask match	—N/a	
September 17	Verano de Escándalo	Naucalpan	El Toreo	17,000	Gronda, Octagón, and La Parka vs.'La Legión Extranjera (Abyss, Jeff Jarrett, and Konnan)	—N/a	
December 8	Guerra de Titanes	Ciudad Madero, Tamaulipas	Convention Center Ciudad Madero	12,000	Cibernético vs. Muerte Cibernetica in an Extreme Coffin match	—N/a	

=== 2007 ===
Date	Event	Location	Venue	Attendance	Main event	Notes	Ref
March 18	Rey de Reyes	Naucalpan	Toreo de Cuatro Caminos	17,000	La Parka vs. Octagón vs. Abismo Negro vs. Rhino vs. Fuerza Guerrera vs. Latin Lover for the Rey de Reyes trophy	—N/a	
July 15	Triplemanía XV	Naucalpan	El Toreo	19,000	Los Hell Brothers (Charly Manson, Chessman, and Cibernético) vs. La Legión Extranjera (El Mesías, Sean Waltman, and Kenzo Suzuki) in a Domo de la Muerte Hair vs. Hair match	—N/a	
September 3	TripleSEM	Tokyo, Japan	Differ Ariake Arena	1,400	Los Hell Brothers (Cibernético, Charly Manson and Chessman) vs. Mushiking Terry, Naomichi Marufuji and Ricky Marvin	Co-produced with Noah	
September 16	Verano de Escándalo	Guadalajara, Jalisco	Plaza de Toros Nuevo Pregreso	—N/a	Los Hell Brothers (Charly Manson, Chessman, Cibernético) and El Zorro vs. The Black Family (Dark Cuervo, Dark Escoria, Dark Espíritu and Dark Ozz) in a Domo de la Muerte Hair vs. Hair match	—N/a	
October 7	Antonio Peña Memorial Show	Naucalpan	Toreo de Cuatro Caminos	14,000	La Legión Extranjera (Abismo Negro, Electroshock and El Zorro) vs. Chessman, Cibernético and El Intocable in a Domo de la Muerte match	—N/a	
November 20	Guerra de Titanes	Ciudad Madero, Tamaulipas	Convention Center Ciudad Madero	17,000	El Mesias (c) vs. Cibernético vs. El Zorro for the AAA Mega Championship	—N/a	

=== 2008 ===
Date	Event	Location	Venue	Attendance	Main event	Notes	Ref
March 18	Rey de Reyes	Monterrey, Nuevo León	Plaza de Toros Lorenzo Garza	—N/a	El Mesias (c) vs. Cibernético for the AAA Mega Championship	—N/a	
June 13	Triplemanía XVI	Mexico City	Palacio de los Deportes	19,000	Cibernético (c) vs. El Zorro for the AAA Mega Championship	—N/a	
September 14	Verano de Escándalo	Zapopan, Jalisco	Auditorio Benito Juarez	11,500	Vampiro vs. El Mesías in a Steel Cage Street Fight	—N/a	
October 24	Antonio Peña Memorial Show	Veracruz	Estadio De Beisbol Beto Avila	15,500	La Legión Extranjera (Electroshock, Konnan, Rellik and Kenzo Suzuki) vs. Team AAA (Latin Lover, Octagón, La Parka and Super Fly) in a Steel Cage match	—N/a	
December 6	Guerra de Titanes	Orizaba, Veracruz	Plaza de Toros La Concordia	15,000	El Brazo vs. Pirata Morgan vs. Electroshock vs. Super Fly vs. Brazo de Plata vs. El Elegido in a Steel Cage Hair vs. Hair match	—N/a	

=== 2009 ===
Date	Event	Location	Venue	Attendance	Main event	Notes	Ref
March 15	Rey de Reyes	Guadalajara, Jalisco	Plaza de Toros Nuevo Progreso	15,000	El Mesias (c) vs. Chessman in a Steel Cage match for the AAA Mega Championship	—N/a	
June 13	Triplemanía XVII	Mexico City	Palacio de los Deportes	—N/a	Team AAA (El Hijo del Santo, La Parka, Vampiro, Octagón and Jack Evans) vs. La Legion Extranjera (Silver King, Chessman, Kenzo Suzuki, Electroshock and Teddy Hart) in a Six Sides of Steel match	—N/a	
August 21	Verano de Escándalo	Ciudad Madero, Tamaulipas	Centro de Convenciones de Ciudad Madero	—N/a	Dr. Wagner Jr. (c) vs. El Mesias vs. Cibernético in a Steel Cage match for the AAA Mega Championship	—N/a	
September 26	Héroes Inmortales	Monterrey, Nuevo Leon	Arena Monterrey	—N/a	Dr. Wagner Jr. (c) vs. El Mesías for the AAA Mega Championship	—N/a	
December 11	Guerra de Titanes	Ciudad Madero, Tamaulipas	El Centro de Convenciones	10,345	Dr. Wagner Jr. (c) vs. El Mesías in a Domo de la Muerte match for the AAA Mega Championship	—N/a	

== 2010s ==
=== 2010 ===
Date	Event	Location	Venue	Attendance	Main event	Notes	Ref
March 12	Rey de Reyes	Querétaro, Querétaro	Plaza de Toros Santa María	—N/a	El Mesias (c) vs. Mr. Anderson vs. Electroshock for the AAA Mega Championship	—N/a	
June 6	Triplemanía XVIII	Mexico City	Palacio de los Deportes	—N/a	L.A. Park vs. La Parka in an Apuesta por el Nombre match for the "La Parka" name	—N/a	
August 14	Verano de Escándalo	Orizaba, Veracruz	Plaza de Toros la Concordia	—N/a	Los Perros del Mal (Damián 666, L.A. Park and Perro Aguayo Jr.) vs. Cibernético, El Mesías and La Parka	—N/a	
October 1	Héroes Inmortales	Ciudad Madero, Tamaulipas	Centro de Convenciones Ciudad Madero	—N/a	Legado AAA (Dark Cuervo, Dark Ozz, Heavy Metal and La Parka) vs. La Sociedad (Electroshock, El Zorro, Hernandez and L.A. Park) in a Steel Cage match	—N/a	
December 5	Guerra de Titanes	Zapopan, Jalisco	Auditorio Benito Juárez	6,000	Los Perros del Mal (Damián 666, Halloween and X-Fly) vs. Los Psycho Circus (Psycho Clown, Monster Clown and Murder Clown) in a Steel Cage Weapons match	—N/a	

=== 2011 ===
Date	Event	Location	Venue	Attendance	Main event	Notes	Ref
March 18	Rey de Reyes	Aguascalientes, Aguascalientes	Plaza de Toros Monumental	17,000	Extreme Tiger vs. El Mesías vs. L.A. Park vs. Carlito Caribbean Cool for the Rey de Reyes trophy	—N/a	
June 18	Triplemanía XIX	Mexico City	Palacio de los Deportes	17,900	Dr. Wagner Jr. vs. Rob Van Dam for the inaugural AAA Latin American Championship	—N/a	
July 31	Verano de Escándalo	Guadalajara, Jalisco	Plaza Nuevo Progreso	9,000	Los Psycho Circus (Monster Clown, Murder Clown and Psycho Clown) vs. Los Perros del Mal (Damián 666, Halloween and X-Fly) in a Steel Cage Mask vs. Hair match	—N/a	
October 9	Héroes Inmortales	Monterrey, Nuevo León	Arena Monterrey	8,000	Los Psycho Circus (Monster Clown, Murder Clown and Psycho Clown) vs. Los Perros del Mal (Damián 666, Halloween and Nicho el Millonario) in a Steel Cage Mask vs. Hair match	—N/a	
December 16	Guerra de Titanes	Puebla, Puebla	Estadio Hermanos Serdán	8,500	Dr. Wagner Jr. (c) vs. L.A. Park for the AAA Latin American Championship	—N/a	

=== 2012 ===
Date	Event	Location	Venue	Attendance	Main event	Notes	Ref
March 18	Rey de Reyes	Zapopan, Jalisco	Auditorio Benito Juárez	4,000	Jeff Jarrett (c) vs. El Mesías for the AAA Mega Championship	—N/a	
March 27	Lucha Libre Internacional	Tepic, Nayarit	El Palenque de la Feria	30,000	El Mesías, Chris Masters and Shelton Benjamin vs. Carlito Caribbean Cool, La Parka and Luke Gallows	—N/a	
May 19	Noche de Campeones	Chilpancingo, Guerrero	La Plaza de Toros Belisario Arteaga	3,800	L.A. Park (c) vs. Chessman vs. Cibernético vs. Dr. Wagner Jr. vs. Perro Aguayo Jr. in a Five-way elimination match for the AAA Latin American Championship	—N/a	
August 5	Triplemanía XX	Mexico City	Arena CDMX	21,000	Dr. Wagner Jr. vs. Máscara Año 2000 Jr. in a Mask vs. Mask match	—N/a	
October 7	Héroes Inmortales	San Luis Potosí, San Luis Potosí	Domo Centro de Espectaculos	5,000	Jack Evans and La Secta Bizarra Cibernetica (Cibernético, Dark Cuervo and Dark Ozz) vs. Los Perros del Mal (Halloween, El Hijo del Perro Aguayo, Psicosis and Teddy Hart) in a Domo de la Muerte Hair vs. Hair match	—N/a	
November 27 (Aired February 7, 2013–February 14, 2013)	The Virgin Mary Reina De Reinas	Tokyo, Japan	Korakuen Hall	838	Week 1 (February 7, 2013): Faby Apache vs. Kaguya	Co-produced with Wave	
November 27 (Aired February 7, 2013–February 14, 2013)	The Virgin Mary Reina De Reinas	Tokyo, Japan	Korakuen Hall	838	Week 2 (February 14, 2013): Sexy Star (c) vs. Kaguya in the Reina de Reinas tournament final for the AAA Reina de Reinas Championship	Co-produced with Wave	
December 2	Guerra de Titanes	Zapopan, Jalisco	Auditorio Benito Juárez	7,500	Chessman vs. Vampiro vs. Cibernético vs. Dr. Wagner Jr. vs. L.A. Park vs. El Hijo del Perro Aguayo in a Steel Cage Mask vs. Hair match	—N/a	

=== 2013 ===
Date	Event	Location	Venue	Attendance	Main event	Notes	Ref
March 17	Rey de Reyes	Monterrey, Nuevo León	Plaza de Toros Monumental Lorenzo Garza	10,000	El Mesías vs. Canek vs. L.A. Park in the Rey de Reyes tournament final	—N/a	
June 16	Triplemanía XXI	Mexico City	Arena CDMX	—N/a	El Hijo del Perro Aguayo vs. Cibernético in a 2-out-of-3 Falls Hair vs. Hair match	—N/a	
October 18	Héroes Inmortales	Puebla, Puebla	Gimnasio Miguel Hidalgo	—N/a	La Parka vs. Chessman vs. Fénix vs. El Hijo del Fantasma in the Copa Antonio Peña tournament final	—N/a	
December 8	Guerra de Titanes	Tepic, Nayarit	Auditorio de la Gente	—N/a	Cibernético, El Hijo del Perro Aguayo, El Mesías and La Parka vs. Daga, Jeff Jarrett, La Parka Negra and Psicosis	—N/a	

=== 2014 ===
Date	Event	Location	Venue	Attendance	Main event	Notes	Ref
March 16	Rey de Reyes	Monterrey, Nuevo León	Plaza de Toros Monumental Lorenzo Garza	—N/a	La Parka vs. Black Warrior vs. El Hijo del Perro Aguayo vs. El Zorro for the Rey de Reyes trophy	—N/a	
June 7	Verano de Escándalo	Orizaba, Veracruz	Plaza de Toros la Concordia	7,000	Ejercito AAA (Cibernético, Myzteziz and La Parka) vs. La Sociedad (Averno, Chessman and El Hijo del Perro Aguayo)	—N/a	
August 17	Triplemanía XXII	Mexico City	Arena CDMX	21,000	El Hijo del Perro Aguayo vs. Cibernético vs. Dr. Wagner Jr. vs. Myzteziz for Copa Triplemanía XXII	—N/a	
October 12	Héroes Inmortales	San Luis Potosí, San Luis Potosí	Domo San Luis	—N/a	El Hijo del Perro Aguayo and El Texano Jr. vs. El Mesías and El Patrón Alberto in a 2-out-of-3 Falls match	—N/a	
December 7	Guerra de Titanes	Zapopan, Jalisco	Auditorio Benito Juárez	—N/a	El Texano Jr. (c) vs. El Patrón Alberto for the AAA Mega Championship	—N/a	

=== 2015 ===
Date	Event	Location	Venue	Attendance	Main event	Notes	Ref
March 18	Rey de Reyes	Zapopan, Jalisco	Auditorio Benito Juárez	—N/a	Myzteziz and Rey Mysterio Jr. vs. El Hijo del Perro Aguayo and Pentagón Jr.	—N/a	
May 24	Lucha Libre World Cup	Mexico City	Palacio de los Deportes	17,000	Rey Mysterio Jr. vs. Johnny Mundo in the Lucha Libre World Cup tournament final	—N/a	
June 14	Verano de Escándalo	Monterrey, Nuevo León	Arena Monterrey	7,000	Myzteziz, La Parka and Rey Mysterio Jr. vs. Johnny Mundo, El Mesias and Pentagón Jr.	—N/a	
August 9	Triplemanía XXIII	Mexico City	Arena CDMX	—N/a	Rey Mysterio Jr. vs. Myzteziz	—N/a	
October 4	Héroes Inmortales	San Luis Potosí, San Luis Potosí	Domo San Luis	10,000	El Patrón Alberto (c) vs. Johnny Mundo for the AAA Mega Championship	—N/a	

=== 2016 ===
Date	Event	Location	Venue	Attendance	Main event	Notes	Ref
January 22	Guerra de Titanes	Zapopan, Jalisco	Auditorio Benito Juárez	—N/a	El Mesías and El Texano Jr. vs. Dr. Wagner Jr. and Psycho Clown	—N/a	
March 23	Rey de Reyes	San Luis Potosí, San Luis Potosí	Plaza de Toros Monumental El Paseo	—N/a	El Texano Jr. vs. El Mesías for the vacant AAA Mega Championship	—N/a	
June 3	Lucha Libre World Cup	Mexico City	Palacio de los Deportes	—N/a	Dragon Azteca Jr. vs. Tyrus	—N/a	
June 5	Lucha Libre World Cup	Mexico City	Palacio de los Deportes	—N/a	Johnny Mundo vs. Pentagon Jr. in the Lucha Libre World Cup men's tournament final	—N/a	
August 28	Triplemanía XXIV	Mexico City	Arena CDMX	22,000	Psycho Clown vs. Pagano in a mask vs. hair match	—N/a	
October 2	Héroes Inmortales	Monterrey, Nuevo León	Arena Monterrey	—N/a	Johnny Mundo (c) vs. Garza Jr. for the AAA Latin American Championship	—N/a	
October 26	Star Battle Japan	Tokyo, Japan	Korakuen Hall	—N/a	Akebono, Naomichi Marufuji & Rey Mysterio Jr. vs Brian Cage, El Texano Jr. & Pentagón Jr.	—N/a	

=== 2017 ===
Date	Event	Location	Venue	Attendance	Main event	Notes	Ref
January 20	Guerra de Titanes	Mexico City	Gimnasio Juan de la Barrera	5,000	Johnny Mundo (c) vs. Pentagón Jr. for the AAA Latin American Championship	—N/a	
March 19	Rey de Reyes	Monterrey, Nuevo León	Arena Jose Sulaiman	—N/a	Aero Star vs. Súper Fly in a Mask vs. Hair match	—N/a	
June 4	Verano de Escándalo	Ciudad Juárez, Chihuahua	Gimnasio Josué Neri Santos	—N/a	Psycho Clown and Dr. Wagner Jr. vs. Nuevo Poder del Norte (Carta Brava Jr. and Soul Rocker) vs. Los Totalmente Traidores (Monster Clown and Murder Clown) in a Mask vs. Mask match	—N/a	
August 26	Triplemanía XXV	Mexico City	Arena CDMX	—N/a	Psycho Clown vs. Dr. Wagner Jr. in a Mask vs. Mask match	—N/a	
October 1	Héroes Inmortales	San Luis Potosí, San Luis Potosí	Domo San Luis	8,250	Pagano vs. Joe Líder vs. El Mesías in a Deathmatch	—N/a	
October 9	Lucha Libre World Cup	Tokyo, Japan	Shin-Kiba 1st Ring	—N/a	Mil Muertes vs. Vampiro	—N/a	
October 10	Lucha Libre World Cup	Tokyo, Japan	Korakuen Hall	—N/a	Team Mexico AAA (Pagano and Psycho Clown) vs. Team Japan Noah (Hi69 and Taiji Ishimori) in the Lucha Libre World Cup tournament final	—N/a	
December 9	Luchando por México	Mexico City	Gimnasio Olímpico Juan de la Barrera	—N/a	El Hijo del Fantasma, Pagano and Psycho Clown vs. El Texano Jr. and Los OGT's (Averno and Chessman)	—N/a	

=== 2018 ===
Date	Event	Location	Venue	Attendance	Main event	Notes	Ref
January 26	Guerra de Titanes-A	Mexico City	Gimnasio Juan de la Barrera	3,500	El Hijo del Fantasma (c) vs. El Texano Jr. in a Steel Cage match for the AAA Latin American Championship	—N/a	
March 4	Rey de Reyes	Acrópolis Puebla	Puebla	5,000	El Hijo del Fantasma vs. El Texano Jr. in a Mask vs. Hair match	—N/a	
June 3	Verano de Escándalo	Monterrey, Nuevo León	Plaza de Toros La Monumental	10,000	Rey Wagner (c) vs. Rey Mysterio Jr. vs. Jeff Jarrett for the AAA Mega Championship	—N/a	
July 21	AAA vs. Elite	Mexico City	Gimnasio Olímpico Juan de la Barrera	—N/a	Team Elite (L.A. Park, Electroshock and Puma King) vs. Team AAA (Rey Wagner, El Hijo del Fantasma and Psycho Clown)	Co-produced with Elite	
August 25	Triplemanía XXVI	Mexico City	Arena CDMX	13,500	L.A. Park vs. El Hijo del Fantasma vs. Pentagón Jr. vs. Psycho Clown in a Poker de Ases Steel Cage Mask vs. Mask match	—N/a	
October 28	Héroes Inmortales	Puebla	Gimnasio Miguel Hidalgo	3,000	Rey Wagner vs. Jeff Jarrett in a Hair vs. Hair match	—N/a	
December 2	Guerra de Titanes-B	Aguascalientes, Aguascalientes	Palenque de la Feria	5,000	Blue Demon Jr. and Killer Kross vs. Psycho Clown and Rey Wagner	—N/a	

=== 2019 ===
Date	Event	Location	Venue	Attendance	Main event	Notes	Ref
March 16	Rey de Reyes	Puebla	Acrópolis Puebla	7,500	Los Lucha Brothers (Fénix and Pentagón Jr.) (c) vs. The Young Bucks (Matt Jackson and Nick Jackson) for the AAA World Tag Team Championship	—N/a	
June 16	Verano de Escándalo	Merida, Yucatán	Poliforum Zamná	6,000	Blue Demon Jr. and Taurus vs. Psycho Clown and Rey Wagner	—N/a	
August 3	Triplemanía XXVII	Mexico City	Arena CDMX	18,000	Blue Demon Jr. vs. Dr. Wagner Jr. in a Mask vs. Hair match	—N/a	
September 15	Lucha Invades NY	New York, New York, U.S.	Hulu Theater	3,000	Blue Demon Jr. vs. Dr. Wagner Jr. in a No Disqualification match	Co-produced with Impact	
October 19	Héroes Inmortales	Orizaba, Veracruz	Coliseo La Concordia	—N/a	Psycho Clown and Rey Escorpión vs. Chessman and Pagano vs. Pentagón Jr. and Texano Jr. vs. Averno and Dr. Wagner Jr. in a Four-way Steel Cage match	—N/a	
December 1	Triplemanía Regia	Monterrey, Nuevo León	Estadio de Béisbol Monterrey	15,000	Aero Star vs. Chessman vs. Monster Clown vs. Psycho Clown vs. Blue Demon Jr. vs. Rey Escorpión vs. Texano Jr. vs. Dr. Wagner Jr. in a Steel Cage Mask vs. Hair match	—N/a	
December 14	Guerra de Titanes	Ciudad Madero, Tamaulipas	Domo Dadero	—N/a	Blue Demon Jr., Rey Escorpión and Rush El Toro Blanco vs. Psycho Clown, Drago, and Dr. Wagner Jr. in a No Disqualification trios match	—N/a	

== 2020s ==
=== 2020 ===
Date	Event	Location	Venue	Attendance	Main event	Notes	Ref
March 13	AAA vs. MLW Super Series	Tijuana, Baja California	Auditorio Fausto Gutierrez	—N/a	La Familia Real (L.A. Park, El Hijo de L.A. Park and L.A. Park Jr.) vs. Psycho Clown, Niño Hamburguesa, and Nicho el Millonario in a No Disqualification trios match	Co-produced with MLW and EMW	
April 18 (Aired May 9)	Lucha Fighter (tournament final)	Mexico City	—N/a	0 (Note: The event was held behind closed doors.)	Psycho Clown vs. Pentagón Jr. in the Lucha Fighter Men's Tournament final	—N/a	
December 12	Triplemanía XXVIII	Mexico City	Arena CDMX	0	Chessman vs. Pagano in a Hair vs. Hair match	—N/a	

=== 2021 ===
Date	Event	Location	Venue	Attendance	Main event	Notes	Ref
May 1	Rey de Reyes	San Pedro Cholula, Puebla	—N/a	0	Psycho Clown and Pagano vs. Chessman and Sam Adonis	Held in conjunction with SECTUR	
July 3	Verano de Escándalo	Santiago de Queretaro, Queretaro	—N/a	0	Los Mercenarios (Rey Escorpion, Taurus, and Texano Jr.) (c) vs. Los Psycho Circus (Monster Clown, Murder Clown and Psycho Clown) for the AAA World Trios Championship	Held in conjunction with SECTUR	
August 14	Triplemanía XXIX	Mexico City	Arena CDMX	4,500	Psycho Clown vs. Rey Escorpión in a Mask vs. Hair match	—N/a	
October 9	Héroes Inmortales	Orizaba, Veracruz	Coliseo La Concordia	—N/a	La Empresa (Puma King, Sam Adonis and DMT Azul) vs. Dave the Clown and Los Psycho Circus (Psycho Clown and Murder Clown)	—N/a	
December 4	Triplemanía Regia II	Monterrey, Nuevo Leon	Estadio de Béisbol Monterrey	13,500	Bandido vs. Bobby Fish vs. Jay Lethal vs. Samuray del Sol vs. Hijo del Vikingo for the vacant AAA Mega Championship	—N/a	

=== 2022 ===
Date	Event	Location	Venue	Attendance	Main event	Notes	Ref
February 19	Rey de Reyes	Veracruz, Veracruz	Estadio Universitario Beto Ávila	—N/a	Hijo del Vikingo (c) vs. Johnny Superstar for the AAA Mega Championship	—N/a	
March 31	AAA Invades WrestleCon	Dallas, Texas, U.S.	Fairmont Hotel	—N/a	Psycho Clown vs. Taurus	Held at WrestleCon	
April 30	Triplemanía XXX: Monterrey	Monterrey, Nuevo Leon	Estadio de Béisbol Monterrey	13,637	Fénix and Hijo del Vikingo vs. The Young Bucks (Matt Jackson and Nick Jackson)	—N/a	
June 18	Triplemanía XXX: Tijuana	Tijuana, Baja California	Estadio Caliente Xoloitzcuintles	16,400	Johnny Hardy and Matt Hardy vs. Los Hermanos Lee (Dragon Lee and Dralístico)	—N/a	
August 5	Verano de Escándalo	Aguascalientes, Aguascalientes	Arena San Marcos	7,950	Los Lucha Bros (Fénix and Pentagón Jr.) and Taya vs. Chik Tormenta, Taurus, and Hijo del Vikingo	—N/a	
September 18	Super Series	Norcross, Georgia, U.S.	Space Events Center	—N/a	Laredo Kid, Komander and Microman vs. Mini Abismo Negro, Gino Medina and Taurus in a Loser Leaves Town match	Co-produced with MLW and Dragon Gate	
October 15	Triplemanía XXX: Mexico City	Mexico City	Arena CDMX	14,100	Pentagón Jr. vs. Villano IV in a Mask vs. Mask match	—N/a	
December 28	Noche de Campeones	Acapulco, Guerrero	Arena GNP Seguros	—N/a	Hijo del Vikingo (c) vs. Bandido for the AAA Mega Championship	—N/a	

=== 2023 ===
Date	Event	Location	Venue	Attendance	Main event	Notes	Ref
February 5	Rey de Reyes	Merida, Yucatan	Poliforum Zamna	—N/a	Sam Adonis vs. Bandido vs. Pagano vs. Hijo del Vikingo in the Rey de Reyes tournament final	—N/a	
February 10	Super Series	Tijuana, Baja California	Auditorio Fausto Gutierrez Moreno	—N/a	Hijo del Vikingo, Psycho Clown, and Rey Horus vs. Johnny Caballero and La Empresa (Gringo Loco and Sam Adonis)	Co-produced with MLW and EMW	
March 4	The World is a Vampire: NWA vs. AAA	Mexico City	Foro Sol	30,000+	Tyrus (c) vs. Daga for the NWA Worlds Heavyweight Championship	Co-produced with NWA	
March 19	Lucha Libre World Cup	Zapopan, Jalisco	Estadio de Béisbol Charros de Jalisco	—N/a	Pentagón Jr. vs. Johnny Caballero in the Lucha Libre World Cup men's final	—N/a	
April 16	Triplemanía XXXI: Monterrey	Monterrey, Nuevo Leon	Estadio de Béisbol Monterrey	14,000	Hijo del Vikingo (c) vs. Komander vs. Rich Swann vs. Swerve Strickland for the AAA Mega Championship	—N/a	
July 15	Triplemanía XXXI: Tijuana	Tijuana, Baja California	Estadio Chevron	15,386	Hijo del Vikingo (c) vs. Kenny Omega for the AAA Mega Championship	—N/a	
July 21	Verano de Escándalo	Aguascalientes, Aguascalientes	Arena San Marcos	—N/a	Cibernético and La Empresa (Gringo Loco and Sam Adonis) vs. Hijo del Vikingo, Alberto El Patrón, and Psycho Clown	—N/a	
August 12	Triplemanía XXXI: Mexico City	Mexico City	Arena CDMX	15,853	Psycho Clown vs Sam Adonis vs. Rush El Toro Blanco vs. L.A. Park in a Hair vs. Mask match	—N/a	
October 1	Héroes Inmortales	Zapopan, Jalisco	Auditorio Benito Juárez	13,000	Team USA (QT Marshall and Sam Adonis) vs. Team Mexico (Octagón Jr. and Alberto El Patrón)	—N/a	
November 19	Guerra de Titanes	Ciudad Juárez, Chihuahua	Gimnasio Josué Neri Santos	8,000	El Hijo del Vikingo (c) vs. Dralístico for the AAA Mega Championship	—N/a	
November 26	Ultra Clash	Monterrey, Nuevo León	Showcenter Complex	—N/a	The Motor City Machine Guns (Chris Sabin and Alex Shelley) and Josh Alexander vs. Trey Miguel and Los Vipers (Látigo and Toxin)	Co-produced with Impact	

=== 2024 ===
Date	Event	Location	Venue	Attendance	Main event	Notes	Ref
February 3	Rey de Reyes	Mexico City, Mexico	Base del Ejercito y Fuerza Aerea	8,400	El Hijo del Vikingo vs. Laredo Kid vs. El Texano Jr. in the three-way Rey de Reyes tournament final	—N/a	
April 27	Triplemanía XXXII: Monterrey	Monterrey, Nuevo León, Mexico	Mobil Super Stadium	—N/a	La Secta (Cibernético, Dark Ozz, and Dark Cuervo) vs. Pagano, El Mesías, and Vampiro	—N/a	
June 15	Triplemanía XXXII: Tijuana	Tijuana, Baja California, Mexico	Estadio Chevron	—N/a	Team Mexico (Vampiro, Alberto El Patrón, and Los Psycho Circus (Dave The Clown and Murder Clown)) vs. Team USA (Q.T. Marshall, Sam Adonis, Parker Boudreaux, and Satnam Singh)	—N/a	
August 2	Verano de Escándalo	Aguascalientes, Mexico	Palenque de la Feria	—N/a	La Secta Del Mesías (El Mesias, Dark Escoria and Dark Espíritu) vs. Los Psycho Circus (Murder Clown, Dave the Clown and Panic Clown) vs. Fresero Jr. and Nueva Generación Dinamita (Sansón and Forastero) in a three-way Steel Cage match	—N/a	
August 17	Triplemanía XXXII: Mexico City	Mexico City, Mexico	Arena CDMX	—N/a	Los Psycho Circus (Murder Clown, Dave the Clown, and Panic Clown) vs. La Secta Cibernética (Cibernético, Dark Cuervo, and Dark Ozz) vs. Los Vipers (El Fiscal, Abismo Negro Jr., and Psicosis) in a Domo de la Muerte Mask vs. Hair match	—N/a	
October 6	Héroes Inmortales	Zapopan, Jalisco, Mexico	Auditorio Benito Juárez	—N/a	Alberto El Patrón (c) vs. Laredo Kid for the AAA Mega Championship	—N/a	
November 11	Guerra de Titanes	Ciudad Juárez, Chihuahua, Mexico	Gimnasio Jsue Neri Santos	—N/a	Alberto El Patrón (c) vs. Pagano for the AAA Mega Championship	—N/a	

=== 2025 ===
Date	Event	Location	Venue	Attendance	Main event	Notes	Ref
March 22	Rey de Reyes	Mexico City, Mexico	Gimnasio Olímpico Juan de la Barrera	—N/a	Alberto El Patrón (c) vs. El Hijo del Vikingo for the AAA Mega Championship	—N/a	
June 7	Worlds Collide: Los Angeles	Inglewood, California, USA	Kia Forum	10,825	El Hijo del Vikingo (c) vs. Chad Gable for the AAA Mega Championship	Co-produced with WWE	
June 15	Triplemanía Regia III	Monterrey, Nuevo León, Mexico	Arena Monterrey	12,000	El Hijo del Vikingo (c) vs. Alberto El Patrón in a Steel Cage match for the AAA Mega Championship	—N/a	
July 11	Verano de Escándalo	Aguascalientes, Mexico	Arena San Marcos	—N/a	El Hijo del Vikingo and King Vikingo vs. Alberto El Patrón and El Mesías	—N/a	
August 16	Triplemanía XXXIII	Mexico City, Mexico	Arena CDMX	19,691	El Hijo del Vikingo (c) vs. Dominik Mysterio vs. Dragon Lee vs. El Grande Americano for the AAA Mega Championship	—N/a	
September 12	Worlds Collide: Las Vegas	Paradise, Nevada, USA	Cox Pavilion at the Thomas & Mack Center	2,485	El Hijo del Vikingo (c) vs. Dominik Mysterio for the AAA Mega Championship	Co-produced with WWE	
October 25	Héroes Inmortales	Mexico City, Mexico	Gimnasio Olímpico Juan de la Barrera	—N/a	Dominik Mysterio (c) vs. Dragon Lee for the AAA Mega Championship	—N/a	
November 18 (Aired November 18–25)	Gold Rush	New York City, New York, USA	The Theater at Madison Square Garden	—N/a	Week 1 (November 18): Tatum Paxley (c) vs. Jacy Jayne in a Last Chance match for the NXT Women's Championship	Co-produced with WWE and TNA	
November 18 (Aired November 18–25)	Gold Rush	New York City, New York, USA	The Theater at Madison Square Garden	—N/a	Week 2 (November 25): Myles Borne vs. Trick Williams in a Men's Iron Survivor Challenge qualifier	Co-produced with WWE and TNA	
December 20	Guerra de Titanes	Guadalajara, Jalisco, Mexico	Arena Guadalajara	13,000	Los Gringos Locos 2.0 (Dominik Mysterio and El Grande Americano) vs. Rey Fénix and Rey Mysterio	—N/a	

=== 2026 ===
Date	Event	Location	Venue	Attendance	Main event	Notes	Ref
March 14 (Aired March 14–28)	Rey de Reyes	Puebla, Puebla, Mexico	Auditorio GNP Seguros	—N/a	Week 1 (March 14): Dominik Mysterio (c) vs. El Hijo del Vikingo in a Lucha de Apuestas No Disqualification match for the AAA Mega Championship	—N/a	
March 14 (Aired March 14–28)	Rey de Reyes	Puebla, Puebla, Mexico	Auditorio GNP Seguros	—N/a	Week 2 (March 21): Pagano and Psycho Clown (c) vs. The War Raiders (Erik and Ivar) for the AAA World Tag Team Championship	—N/a	
March 14 (Aired March 14–28)	Rey de Reyes	Puebla, Puebla, Mexico	Auditorio GNP Seguros	—N/a	Week 3 (March 28): El Fiscal vs. Abismo Negro Jr.	—N/a	
May 30 (Aired May 30–June 6)	Noche de Los Grandes	Monterrey, Nuevo León, Mexico	Arena Monterrey	12,000+	Week 1 (May 30): El Grande Americano vs. "The Original" El Grande Americano in a No Disqualification Mask vs. Mask match	—N/a	
May 30 (Aired May 30–June 6)	Noche de Los Grandes	Monterrey, Nuevo León, Mexico	Arena Monterrey	12,000+	Week 2 (June 6): Bayley, La Catalina, and Lola Vice vs. Las Tóxicas (Flammer, La Hiedra, and Maravilla)	—N/a	
July 25 (Aired July 25–August 8)	Verano de Escándalo	Aguascalientes, Aguascalientes, Mexico	Arena San Marcos	—N/a	Week 1 (July 25): Dominik Mysterio and El Grande Americano vs. Los Perros del Mal (Daga and Angel)	—N/a	
July 25 (Aired July 25–August 8)	Verano de Escándalo	Aguascalientes, Aguascalientes, Mexico	Arena San Marcos	—N/a	Week 2 (August 1): Rey Fénix (c) vs. Mini Vikingo for the AAA World Cruiserweight Championship	—N/a	
July 25 (Aired July 25–August 8)	Verano de Escándalo	Aguascalientes, Aguascalientes, Mexico	Arena San Marcos	—N/a	Week 3 (August 8): Flammer (c) vs. La Catalina vs. Lady Shani for the AAA Reina de Reinas Championship	—N/a	
August 30	Ola de Calor	Edinburg, Texas, USA	Bert Ogden Arena	5,581	Dragon Lee and The Lucha Brothers (Penta and Rey Fénix) vs. Los Perros del Mal (Daga, Angel, and Berto)	Held right before NXT Heatwave in the same venue	
September 11	Triplemanía 34	Paradise, Nevada, USA	MGM Grand Garden Arena	6,604	Rey Mysterio vs. Omos	—N/a	
September 13	Triplemanía 34	Azcapotzalco, Mexico City, Mexico	Arena CDMX	18,204	Dominik Mysterio (c) vs. El Grande Americano in a No Disqualification match for the AAA Mega Championship	—N/a	
September 26 (Aired September 30)	Worlds Collide: Chicago	Rosemont, Illinois, USA	Allstate Arena	13,979	CM Punk, Rey Mysterio, and El Grande Americano vs. Omos, Dominik Mysterio, and JD McDonagh	Co-produced with WWE	
October 24 (Aired October 24–November 7)	Héroes Inmortales	Mexico City, Mexico	Gimnasio Olímpico Juan de la Barrera	5,000	Week 1 (October 24): El Grande Americano (c) vs. Dominik Mysterio for the AAA Mega Championship	—N/a	
October 24 (Aired October 24–November 7)	Héroes Inmortales	Mexico City, Mexico	Gimnasio Olímpico Juan de la Barrera	5,000	Week 2 (October 31): Rey Fénix (c) vs. Jack Cartwheel vs. Laredo Kid vs. Takuma for the AAA World Cruiserweight Championship	—N/a	
October 24 (Aired October 24–November 7)	Héroes Inmortales	Mexico City, Mexico	Gimnasio Olímpico Juan de la Barrera	5,000	Week 3 (November 7): Abismo Negro Jr. vs. El Fiscal	—N/a	

== Upcoming event schedule ==
=== 2026 ===
Date	Event	Location	Venue	Attendance	Main event	Notes	Ref.
December 15	Worlds Collide: Doomsday	Kissimmee, Florida, USA	ESPN Wide World of Sports Complex			Co-produced with WWE	
December 19	Guerra de Titanes	Guadalajara, Jalisco, Mexico	Arena Guadalajara				

=== 2027 ===
Date	Event	Location	Venue	Attendance	Main event	Notes	Ref
April	Eternal Glory	New York City, New York, U.S.	Infosys Theater at Madison Square Garden				

== Number of events by year ==
Total: 185 (2 upcoming)

Number of major Lucha Libre AAA Worldwide events by year

== See also ==
- Lucha libre
- List of WWE pay-per-view and livestreaming supercards
