= Triplemanía XXXII =

2024 Lucha Libre AAA Worldwide event

- Promotional poster for the Monterrey event featuring various AAA luchadores and luchadoras
- Promotion: Lucha Libre AAA Worldwide
- Date: April 27, June 15, and August 17, 2024
- City: Monterrey, Nuevo Leon, Mexico (April 27); Tijuana, Baja California, Mexico (June 15); Azcapotzalco, Mexico City, Mexico (August 17)
- Venue: Mobil Super Stadium (April 27); Chevron Stadium (June 15); Arena CDMX (August 17)
- Tagline(s): AAA Orígenes (Spanish for: AAA Origins)

Event chronology
← Previous; Rey de Reyes	Next → Verano de Escándalo

Triplemanía chronology
← Previous; XXXI	Next → Regia III

Triplemanía XXXII was a three-day professional wrestling pay-per-view supercard event produced and scripted by the Mexican professional wrestling promotion Lucha Libre AAA Worldwide (AAA). Three shows were held across April 27, June 15, and August 17, 2024. The April 27 event took place at Mobil Super Stadium in Monterrey, the June 15 event took take place at Chevron Stadium in Tijuana, and the August 17 event took take place at Arena CDMX in Mexico City. It was the 32nd mainline Triplemanía event, and the 43rd, 44th and 45th overall shows held under the Triplemanía banner. It was the last Triplemanía to be produced by AAA under the Peña family ownership prior to its acquisition by WWE in 2025.

The August 17 event was known for the appearance of WWE Hall of Famer John Layfield. It also featured an appearance from La Parka, despite the fact that the previous man behind the mask, Jesús Alfonso Huerta Escoboza, died in January 2020 after succumbing to injuries that he sustained in a match in October 2019. The use of Michael Jackson's Thriller as the coffin was opened was a foreshadowing. During Rey de Reyes, La Parka III was unveiled, again using the song.

== Production ==
=== Background ===
2024 will mark the 32nd year that the Mexican professional wrestling company Lucha Libre AAA Worldwide (Triple A or AAA) will hold their annual flagship Triplemanía show. Triplemanía is the company's biggest show of the year, the AAA equivalent of WWE's WrestleMania or New Japan Pro-Wrestling's Wrestle Kingdom event. Triplemanía XXXII will be the 43th, 44th and 45th overall Triplemanía show promoted by AAA (AAA promoted multiple Triplemanía shows over the summers of 1994 to 1997). Since the 2012 event, Triplemanía has taken place at the Arena Ciudad de México (Mexico City Arena), an indoor arena in Azcapotzalco, Mexico City, Mexico that has a maximum capacity of 22,300 spectators. On January 23, 2024, AAA announced that Triplemanía XXXII would be held on April 27, June 15, and August 17.

=== Storylines ===
Triplemanía XXXII featured several professional wrestling matches, with different wrestlers involved in pre-existing scripted feuds, plots and storylines. Wrestlers portrayed either heels (referred to as rudos in Mexico, those that portray the "bad guys") or faces (técnicos in Mexico, the "good guy" characters) as they engaged in a series of tension-building events, which culminated in a wrestling match.

== Results ==
=== Triplemanía XXXII: Monterrey (April 27) ===
No.	Results	Stipulations	Times
1	Las Toxicas (Flammer, La Hiedra, and Maravilla) and Dalys defeated Faby Apache, Estrellita, Sexy Star, and Reina Dorada by pinfall	Eight-woman tag team match	7:05
2	Pimpinela Escarlata won by last eliminating Antifaz del Norte (Note: Other participants in the match: El Elegido, Super Caló, Aero Star, Chessman, Niño Hamburguesa, Mr. Iguana, Charly Manson, Abismo Negro Jr., Heavy Metal, Super Crazy, El Fiscal, and Toscano.)	Gauntlet match for the Bardahl Cup: Monterrey	25:17
3	Dr. Wagner Jr., Bestia 666, and Tigre Blanco (Note: Not the famous Tigre Blanco, who previously wrestled in AAA and CMLL, but rather a debuting luchador billed as the son of the original Máscara Sagrada.) defeated Negro Casas and Nueva Generacion Dinamita (Sansón and Forastero by pinfall	Trios match	18:27
4	Nic Nemeth defeated Alberto El Patrón by pinfall	Singles match for the vacant AAA Mega Championship	16:11
5	Team USA (Sam Adonis, Q. T. Marshall, Parker Boudreaux, and Satnam Singh) (with Jeff Jarrett) defeated Team Mexico (Laredo Kid, Octagón Jr. and Los Psycho Circus (Psycho Clown and Murder Clown)) by pinfall	Eight-man tag team match	11:49
6	Pagano, El Mesías, and Vampiro (with Latin Lover) defeated La Secta (Cibernético, Dark Ozz, and Dark Cuervo) by pinfall	Trios match This match was held as part of Vampiro's retirement tour.	15:59

=== Triplemanía XXXII: Tijuana (June 15) ===
No.	Results	Stipulations	Times
1	Team AAA (Pimpinela Escarlata, Niño Hamburguesa, Mr. Iguana and Faby Apache) (with Microman) defeated Team The Crash (Anubis, Keyra, Mamba, and Toto) by pinfall	Eight-person tag team match	9:27
2	Team TNA (Decay (Havok and Rosemary) and Tasha Steelz) defeated Las Toxicas (Lady Flammer, La Hiedra, and Lady Maravilla) by pinfall	Six-woman tag team match	5:30
3	Team The Crash (D'Luxe, Noisy Boy, and Destiny) defeated Team AAA (Komander, Laredo Kid, and Octagón Jr.) and Team Rest of the World (Cima, Dinamico, and Willie Mack) by pinfall	Three-way trios match Copa Triplemanía match	15:17
4	Mecha Wolf (with Violent J) defeated Rey Horus and Bestia 666 by pinfall	Three-way match	13:23
5	La Secta del Mesías (El Mesías, Dark Scoria, and Dark Espíritu) defeated La Secta Cibernética (Cibernético, Dark Cuervo, and Dark Ozz) by pinfall	Trios match	9:25
6	Team The Crash (La Dinastía Wagner (Dr. Wagner Jr., Galeno del Mal, and El Hijo del Dr. Wagner Jr.)) defeated Team AAA (La Dinastía Casas-Alvarado (Negro Casas, Psycho Clown, and Brazo de Oro Jr.)) by pinfall	Trios match Legacy vs. Legacy match	15:38
7	Team USA (Q.T. Marshall, Sam Adonis, Parker Boudreaux, and Satnam Singh) (with Jeff Jarrett) defeated Team Mexico (Vampiro, Alberto El Patrón, and Los Psycho Circus (Dave The Clown and Murder Clown)) by pinfall	Eight-man tag team match This match was held as part of Vampiro's retirement tour.	9:34

=== Triplemanía XXXII: Mexico City (August 17) ===
No.	Results	Stipulations	Times
1	Flammer (with Dalys) (c) defeated Faby Apache (with Sexy Star) by pinfall	Singles match for the AAA Reina de Reinas Championship	10:27
2	Octagón Jr. won by last eliminating Zumbido (Note: Other participants in the match: Jessy Queen, El Elegido, El Guapito, La Hiedra, Mr. Iguana, Microman, Estrellita, Mascarita Sagrada, Charly Manson, Heavy Metal, Kenzo Suzuki, Marco Corleone, Pimpinela Escarlata, and Alan Stone.)	Gauntlet match for the Bardahl Cup: Mexico City	32:40
3	Team India (Raj Dhesi and Satnam Singh) (with Jeff Jarrett and Karen Jarrett) defeated La Dinastía Casas-Alvarado (Negro Casas and Psycho Clown) (c) and La Dinastía Wagner (Dr. Wagner Jr. and Galeno del Mal) by pinfall	Three-way tag team match for the AAA World Tag Team Championship	14:18
4	Matt Riddle defeated Komander (c) and Laredo Kid by pinfall	Three-way match for the AAA World Cruiserweight Championship	13:03
5	Vampiro defeated El Mesías	Casket match This match was held as part of Vampiro's retirement tour.	9:35
6	Alberto El Patrón defeated Nic Nemeth (c) (with John Layfield) by pinfall	Singles match for the AAA Mega Championship	13:05
7	Los Psycho Circus (Murder Clown, Dave the Clown, and Panic Clown) and La Secta Cibernética (Cibernético, Dark Cuervo, and Dark Ozz) defeated Los Vipers (El Fiscal, Abismo Negro Jr., and Psicosis)	Domo De La Muerte Mask vs. Hair cage match Since Psicosis did not escape the cage, he lost his mask.	15:53
(c) / – the champion(s) heading into the match

== See also ==
- 2024 in professional wrestling
