= Verano de Escándalo (2024) =

2024 Lucha Libre AAA Worldwide event

- Promotion: Lucha Libre AAA Worldwide
- Date: August 2, 2024
- City: Aguascalientes, Aguascalientes, Mexico
- Venue: Palenque de la Feria

Event chronology
← Previous; Triplemanía XXXII: Tijuana	Next → Triplemanía XXXII: Mexico City

Verano de Escándalo chronology
← Previous; 2023	Next → 2025

The 2024 Verano de Escándalo (Spanish for "Summer of Scandal") was a professional wrestling event produced by the Mexican professional wrestling promotion Lucha Libre AAA Worldwide (AAA). The event took place on August 2, 2024, at Palenque de la Feria in Aguascalientes, Aguascalientes, Mexico. It was the 23rd Verano de Escándalo event promoted by AAA since 1997.

== Production ==
=== Background ===
In September 1997, Mexican professional wrestling, company Asistencia Asesoría y Administración, later known as simply AAA and then Lucha Libre AAA Worldwide, added a new major event to their schedule as they held the first ever Verano de Escándalo ("Summer of Scandal") show on September 14, 1997. The Verano de Escándalo show became an annual event from 1997 until 2011, usually held in September, with few exceptions. In 2012 AAA changed their major event schedule as they pushed Triplemanía XX to August instead of holding the show in June or July as had been the case up until 2012. With the change to the schedule AAA did not hold a Verano de Escándalo show in 2012 and 2013. In 2014 the show was put back on the schedule, but held in June instead, filling the void left when Triplemanía was moved. AAA did not hold a Verano de Escándalo in 2016, instead holding the Lucha Libre World Cup in June. A Verano de Escándalo show was not held in 2020 due to the COVID-19 pandemic.

=== Storylines ===
The event featured professional wrestling matches that involve wrestlers from scripted feuds. The wrestlers will portray either heels (referred to as rudos in Mexico, those that play the part of the "bad guys") or faces (técnicos in Mexico, the "good guy" characters) as they perform.

== Results ==
No.	Results	Stipulations
1	Faby Apache defeated La Hiedra, Maravilla, Reina Dorada, Sexy Star and Suss Love by pinfall	Six-way elimination match for a AAA Reina de Reinas Championship match at Triplemanía XXXII: Mexico City
2	Decay (Havok and Crazzy Steve) defeated Aero Star and Estrellita and Negro Casas and Dalys by pinfall	Three-way mixed tag team match to determine the #1 contenders to the AAA Mixed Tag Team Championship
3	Pimpinela Escarlata and Las Shotas (Dulce Kanela and Jessy Queen) defeated Guapos VIP (Alan Stone, Scorpio Jr. and Zumbido) by submission	Trios match
4	Octagón Jr. (c) defeated Belcegor, Taurus and Drago by pinfall	Four-way match for the AAA Latin American Championship
5	Alberto El Patrón, Psycho Clown, and Vampiro defeated La Secta Cibernética (Cibernético, Dark Cuervo, and Dark Ozz) by pinfall	Trios match
6	Nueva Generación Dinamita (Sansón and Forastero) and Fresero Jr., and La Secta del Mesías (El Mesias, Dark Escoria, and Dark Espíritu) defeated Los Psycho Circus (Murder Clown, Dave the Clown, and Panic Clown)	Three-way tag team elimination Steel Cage match
(c) / – the champion(s) heading into the match
