= Rey de Reyes (2025) =

2025 Lucha Libre AAA Worldwide Event

- Promotional poster of the event
- Promotion: Lucha Libre AAA Worldwide
- Date: March 22, 2025
- City: Mexico City, Mexico
- Venue: Gimnasio Olímpico Juan de la Barrera

Event chronology
← Previous; Guerra de Titanes	Next → Worlds Collide

Rey de Reyes chronology
← Previous; 2024	Next → 2026

The 2025 Rey de Reyes (Spanish for "2025 King of Kings") was a professional wrestling tournament and supercard event produced by the Mexican Lucha Libre AAA Worldwide (AAA) promotion. The event took place on March 22, 2025, at the Gimnasio Olímpico Juan de la Barrera in Mexico City, Mexico.

The event was notable for marking the debut appearance of the third La Parka.

== Production ==
=== Background ===
Since 1997 and every year except 2020, the Mexican Lucha Libre, or professional wrestling, company AAA has held a Rey de Reyes (Spanish for "King of Kings") show in the spring. The 1997 version was held in February, while all subsequent Rey de Reyes shows were held in March. As part of their annual Rey de Reyes event AAA holds the eponymous Rey de Reyes tournament to determine that specific year's Rey. Most years the show hosts both the qualifying round and the final match, but on occasion the qualifying matches have been held prior to the event as part of AAA's weekly television shows. The traditional format consists of four preliminary rounds, each a Four-man elimination match with each of the four winners face off in the tournament finals, again under elimination rules. There have been years where AAA has employed a different format to determine a winner. The winner of the Rey de Reyes tournament is given a large ornamental sword to symbolize their victory, but is normally not guaranteed any other rewards for winning the tournament, although some years becoming the Rey de Reyes has earned the winner a match for the AAA Mega Championship. From 1999 through 2009 AAA also held an annual Reina de Reinas ("Queen of Queens") tournament, but later turned that into an actual championship that could be defended at any point during the year, abandoning the annual tournament concept. On February 13, 2025, AAA announced that Rey de Reyes would take place on March 22, 2025. The 2025 show will be the 28th Rey de Reyes show in the series.

=== Storylines ===
Rey de Reyes featured professional wrestling matches that involved wrestlers from scripted feuds. The wrestlers portrayed either heels (referred to as rudos in Mexico, those that play the part of the "bad guys") or faces (técnicos in Mexico, the "good guy" characters) as they performed.

== Aftermath ==
On April 19, 2025, WWE announced on its WrestleMania 41 pre-show panel that they signed a letter of intent to acquire AAA jointly with Mexican holding company Fillip, which eventually closed on August 1, 2025.

== Results ==
No.	Results	Stipulations	Times
1	El Mesías defeated Pimpinela Escarlata, Mr. Iguana and Panic Clown by pinfall	Four-way match This was a Rey de Reyes qualifying match.	3:16
2	Niño Hamburguesa defeated Takuma, Belcegor and El Fiscal by pinfall	Four-way match This was a Rey de Reyes qualifying match.	5:41
3	Hijo de Dr. Wagner Jr. defeated Mecha Wolf 450, Chessman and Negro Casas by pinfall	Four-way match This was a Rey de Reyes qualifying match.	6:16
4	DMT Azul defeated Taurus, Aero Star and Cibernético by pinfall	Four-way match This was a Rey de Reyes qualifying match.	8:58
5	Nueva Generación Dinamita (Sansón and Forastero) defeated Laredo Kid and Pagano, and Jeff Jarrett and Sam Adonis by pinfall	Three-way tag team match for the vacant AAA World Tag Team Championship	12:59
6	Flammer (c) defeated Dalys by pinfall	Singles match for the AAA Reina de Reinas Championship	14:27
7	Niño Hamburguesa defeated El Mesías, Hijo de Dr. Wagner Jr. and DMT Azul by pinfall	Four-way Rey de Reyes final	14:47
8	Alberto El Patrón (c) (with El Mesías, Sansón and Dorian Roldán) defeated El Hijo del Vikingo (with King Vikingo, Latin Lover, Laredo Kid and Niño Hamburguesa) by pinfall	Singles match for the AAA Mega Championship	23:26
(c) / – the champion(s) heading into the match

=== Tournament bracket ===
1st Round; Rey de Reyes; March 22, 2025
El Mesías	Pinfall
Mr. Iguana	3:16
Panic Clown	—
Pimpinela Escarlata	—
Belcegor	—
El Fiscal	—
Niño Hamburguesa	Pinfall
Takuma	5:41
Chessman	6:16
Hijo de Dr. Wagner Jr.	Pinfall
Mecha Wolf 450	—
Negro Casas	—
Aero Star	—
Cibernético	—
DMT Azul	Pinfall
Taurus	8:58

Final; Rey de Reyes; March 22, 2025
El Mesías	14:47
Niño Hamburguesa	Pinfall
Hijo de Dr. Wagner Jr.	—
DMT Azul	—

== See also ==
- 2024 in professional wrestling
