= Triplemanía Regia III =

2025 Lucha Libre AAA Worldwide event

- Promotion: Lucha Libre AAA Worldwide
- Date: June 15, 2025
- City: Monterrey, Nuevo Leon, Mexico
- Venue: Arena Monterrey
- Attendance: 12,000

Event chronology
| ← Previous; Worlds Collide | Next → Verano de Escándalo |

Triplemanía chronology
| ← Previous; XXXII | Next → XXXIII |

Triplemanía Regia III was a professional wrestling supercard event produced and scripted by the Mexican promotion Lucha Libre AAA Worldwide (AAA). The event was held on June 15, 2025 at Arena Monterrey in Monterrey, Nuevo Leon, Mexico and it featured wrestlers from WWE, which announced its intent to acquire AAA in partnership with Fillip on April 19, 2025. However, the deal was not completed at the time of the event (the deal closed on August 1, 2025). It was the 46th overall show held under the Triplemanía banner. The annual Triplemanía shows serve as AAA's biggest events of the year, serving as the culmination of major storylines in what has been described as AAA's version of WWE's WrestleMania event.

== Production ==
=== Background ===
2025 will mark the 33rd year that the Mexican company Lucha Libre AAA Worldwide (Triple A or AAA) will hold their annual flagship Triplemanía show. Triplemanía is the company's biggest show of the year, the AAA equivalent of WWE's WrestleMania or New Japan Pro-Wrestling's Wrestle Kingdom event. Triplemanía Regia III will be the 46th overall Triplemanía show promoted by AAA (AAA promoted multiple Triplemanía shows over the summers of 1994 to 1997). Since the 2012 event, Triplemanía has taken place at the Arena Ciudad de México (Mexico City Arena), an indoor arena in Azcapotzalco, Mexico City, Mexico that has a maximum capacity of 22,300 spectators. On April 23, 2025, AAA announced that Triplemanía Regia III would be held on June 15. The event will feature the involvement of wrestlers from WWE and Total Nonstop Action Wrestling (TNA).

=== Storylines ===
Triplemanía Regia III will feature several professional wrestling matches, with different wrestlers involve in pre-existing scripted feuds, plots, and storylines. Wrestlers portrayed either heels (referred to as rudos in Mexico, those that portray the "bad guys") or faces (técnicos in Mexico, the "good guy" characters) as they engage in a series of tension-building events, which culminate in a wrestling match.

== Results ==
| No. | Results | Stipulations | Times |
|---|---|---|---|
| 1^{D} | Emperador Azteca, Charro Negro, and Tigre Universitario Jr. defeated El Líder, Oro Negro, and Dark Zorro | Trios match | — |
| 2 | Lady Flammer (c) defeated Dalys and Lady Shani by pinfall | Three-way match for the AAA Reina de Reinas Championship | 7:15 |
| 3 | La Parka and Aztec Warriors (Octagón Jr. and Laredo Kid) defeated Los Vipers (Abismo Negro Jr., Taurus, and Histeria) by pinfall | Trios match | 12:09 |
| 4 | Niño Hamburguesa, El Fiscal and Mr. Iguana defeated Tokyo Bad Boys (Kento, Nobu San, and Takuma) by pinfall | Trios match | 10:02 |
| 5 | Moose (c) defeated El Mesías, Joe Hendry and El Hijo de Dr. Wagner Jr. by pinfall | Four-way match for the TNA X Division Championship | 12:22 |
| 6 | Los Garza (Angel and Berto) defeated Nueva Generación Dinamita (Sansón and Forastero) (c), The Nemeth Brothers (Nic Nemeth and Ryan Nemeth) and Psycho Clown and Pagano | Four-way tag team match for the AAA World Tag Team Championship | 17:28 |
| 7 | El Hijo del Vikingo (c) defeated Alberto El Patrón | Steel Cage match for the AAA Mega Championship | 26:35 |
(c) / – the champion(s) heading into the match; D / – this was a dark match

== See also ==
- 2025 in professional wrestling
- List of major Lucha Libre AAA Worldwide events
