= Verano de Escándalo (2025) =

2025 Lucha Libre AAA Worldwide event

- Promotion: Lucha Libre AAA Worldwide
- Date: July 11, 2025
- City: Aguascalientes, Aguascalientes, Mexico
- Venue: Arena San Marcos

Event chronology
← Previous; Triplemanía Regia III	Next → Triplemanía XXXIII

Verano de Escándalo chronology
← Previous; 2024	Next → 2026

The 2025 Verano de Escándalo (Spanish for "Summer of Scandal") was a professional wrestling event produced by the Mexican professional wrestling promotion Lucha Libre AAA Worldwide (AAA). The event took place on July 11, 2025, at Arena San Marcos in Aguascalientes, Aguascalientes, Mexico. It was the 25th Verano de Escándalo event promoted by AAA since 1997.

== Production ==
=== Background ===
In September 1997, Mexican professional wrestling, company Asistencia Asesoría y Administración, later known as simply AAA and then Lucha Libre AAA Worldwide, added a new major event to their schedule as they held the first ever Verano de Escándalo ("Summer of Scandal") show on September 14, 1997. The Verano de Escándalo show became an annual event from 1997 until 2011, usually held in September, with few exceptions. In 2012 AAA changed their major event schedule as they pushed Triplemanía XX to August instead of holding the show in June or July as had been the case up until 2012. With the change to the schedule AAA did not hold a Verano de Escándalo show in 2012 and 2013. In 2014 the show was put back on the schedule, but held in June instead, filling the void left when Triplemanía was moved. AAA did not hold a Verano de Escándalo in 2016, instead holding the Lucha Libre World Cup in June. A Verano de Escándalo show was not held in 2020 due to the COVID-19 pandemic.

=== Storylines ===
The event featured professional wrestling matches that involve wrestlers from scripted feuds. The wrestlers will portray either heels (referred to as rudos in Mexico, those that play the part of the "bad guys") or faces (técnicos in Mexico, the "good guy" characters) as they perform.

== Results ==
No.	Results	Stipulations	Times
1	Maravilla and Chik Tormenta defeated Lady Shani by pinfall (Note: Maravilla and Tormenta pinned Lady Shani at the same time, thus the official decision was that both women won the match.)	Three-way match	6:02
2	La Parka, Aerostar and Niño Hamburguesa defeated Los Psycho Circus (Murder Clown, Dave the Clown and Panic Clown) by pinfall	Trios match	11:48
3	Cibernético, Pagano and El Fiscal defeated Los Vipers (Abismo Negro Jr., Histeria and Taurus) by pinfall	Trios match	7:45
4	El Hijo del Dr. Wagner Jr. defeated Mecha Wolf by pinfall	Singles match to determine the #1 contender to the AAA Latin American Championship	11:08
5	La Hiedra and Mr. Iguana defeated Lola Vice and Santino Marella by pinfall	Mixed tag team match	8:33
6	Los Garza (Angel and Berto) (c) defeated Aztec Warriors (Laredo Kid and Octagón Jr.) by pinfall	Tag team match for the AAA World Tag Team Championship	13:56
7	El Ojo (Alberto El Patrón and El Mesías) defeated El Hijo del Vikingo and King Vikingo by pinfall	Tag team match	14:26
(c) / – the champion(s) heading into the match
