= Guerra de Titanes (2024) =

2024 Lucha Libre AAA Worldwide show

- Promotional poster of the event
- Promotion: Lucha Libre AAA Worldwide
- Date: November 10, 2024
- City: Ciudad Juárez, Chihuahua, Mexico
- Venue: Gimnasio Josué Neri Santos

Event chronology
← Previous; Héroes Inmortales XVI	Next → Rey de Reyes

Guerra de Titanes chronology
← Previous; 2023	Next → 2025

Guerra de Titanes (2024) (Spanish for "War of the Titans") was a professional wrestling event produced by the Mexican professional wrestling promotion Lucha Libre AAA Worldwide (AAA). The event took place on November 10, 2024, at the Gimnasio Josue Neri Santos in Ciudad Juárez, Chihuahua, Mexico. It was the twenty fifth Guerra de Titanes show promoted by AAA since 1997.

== Production ==
=== Background ===
Starting in 1997 the Mexican professional wrestling, company AAA has held a major wrestling show late in the year, either November or December, called Guerra de Titanes ("War of the Titans"). The show often features championship matches or Lucha de Apuestas or bet matches where the competitors risked their wrestling mask or hair on the outcome of the match. In Lucha Libre, the Lucha de Apuetas match is considered more prestigious than a championship match and many major shows feature one or more Apuesta matches. The Guerra de Titanes show is hosted in a new location each year, emanating from cities such as Madero, Chihuahua City, Mexico City, Guadalajara, Jalisco and others. In 2016, AAA moved the Guerra de Titanes show to January but in 2018 the show was held in December which continued with the 2019 event.

On October 10, 2024 it was announced that Guerra de Titanes would take place on November 11, 2024, at the Gimnasio Jsue Neri Santos in Ciudad Juárez, Chihuahua, Mexico.

=== Storylines ===
Guerra de Titanes feature several professional wrestling matches, with different wrestlers involved in pre-existing scripted feuds, plots and storylines. Wrestlers portrayed either heels (referred to as rudos in Mexico, those that portray the "bad guys") or faces (técnicos in Mexico, the "good guy" characters) as they followed a series of tension-building events, which culminated in wrestling matches.

== Results ==
No.	Results	Stipulations	Times
1	Mascarita Sagrada, Payaso Balin, Sakura and Pimpinela Escarlata defeated Eddy Maceyra, Mini Abismo Negro, Monaguillo and Zafiro by pinfall	Eight-person tag team match	6:53
2	Pierroth Jr. (KAOZ) defeated Kempo Jr. (Norteste) and Aéreo (Juarez) by pinfall	Winner Takes All three-way match for the KAOZ Heavyweight Championship, Norteste Light Heavyweight Championship and Juarez Absoluto Championship	10:58
3	Decay (Crazzy Steve and Havok) (c) defeated Brazo de Oro Jr. and Reina Dorada by pinfall	Mixed tag team match for the AAA World Mixed Tag Team Championship	8:37
4	Mecha Wolf, Pagano and Vampiro defeated Los Vipers (Abismo Negro Jr., Psicosis and Taurus) by pinfall	Lights Out Six-man tag team match	5:33
5	La Fraternidad (Laredo Kid, Dinamico and Drago) defeated Tokyo Bad Boys (Kento, Nobu San and Takuma) by pinfall	Six-man tag team match	13:50
6	El Mesias defeated Octagón Jr. (c) by pinfall	Singles match for the AAA Latin American Championship	21:20
7	Alberto El Patrón (c) defeated Pagano by pinfall	Singles match for the AAA Mega Championship	21:20
(c) / – the champion(s) heading into the match
