= Verano de Escándalo (2023) =

2023 Lucha Libre AAA Worldwide event

- Promotion: Lucha Libre AAA Worldwide
- Date: July 21, 2023
- City: Aguascalientes, Aguascalientes, Mexico
- Venue: Arena San Marcos

Event chronology
| ← Previous; Triplemanía XXXI: Tijuana | Next → Triplemanía XXXI: Mexico City |

Verano de Escándalo chronology
| ← Previous; 2022 | Next → 2024 |

The 2023 Verano de Escándalo (Spanish for "Summer of Scandal") was a professional wrestling event produced by the Mexican professional wrestling promotion Lucha Libre AAA Worldwide (AAA). The event took place on July 21, 2023, at Arena San Marcos in Aguascalientes, Aguascalientes, Mexico. It was the 22nd Verano de Escándalo event promoted by AAA since 1997.

== Production ==
=== Background ===
In September 1997, Mexican professional wrestling, company Asistencia Asesoría y Administración, later known as simply AAA and then Lucha Libre AAA Worldwide, added a new major event to their schedule as they held the first ever Verano de Escándalo ("Summer of Scandal") show on September 14, 1997. The Verano de Escándalo show became an annual event from 1997 until 2011, usually held in September, with few exceptions. In 2012 AAA changed their major event schedule as they pushed Triplemanía XX to August instead of holding the show in June or July as had been the case up until 2012. With the change to the schedule AAA did not hold a Verano de Escándalo show in 2012 and 2013. In 2014 the show was put back on the schedule, but held in June instead, filling the void left when Triplemanía was moved. AAA did not hold a Verano de Escándalo in 2016, instead holding the Lucha Libre World Cup in June. A Verano de Escándalo show was not held in 2020 due to the COVID-19 pandemic.

=== Storylines ===
The event featured professional wrestling matches that involve wrestlers from scripted feuds. The wrestlers will portray either heels (referred to as rudos in Mexico, those that play the part of the "bad guys") or faces (técnicos in Mexico, the "good guy" characters) as they perform.

== Results ==
| No. | Results | Stipulations | Times |
|---|---|---|---|
| 1^{D} | Los Cachanillas (Skalibur, Kamik-C, and Dinamíco) defeated Las Shotas (Dulce Kanela, Jessy Ventura, and La Diva Salvaje) by pinfall | Six-person mixed tag team match | 9:00 |
| 2^{D} | Jack Cartwheel, Willie Mack, and Laredo Kid defeated Látigo, Antifaz del Norte, and Toscano by disqualification | Trios match | 11:41 |
| 3^{D} | Drago, Dalys, and Negro Casas defeated Nicho el Millonario, La Hiedra, and Puma King by pinfall | Six-person mixed tag team match | 9:07 |
| 4 | Los Vipers (Toxin, Abismo Negro Jr, and Psicosis) defeated Nueva Generacion Dinamita (Hijo de Mascara Ano 2000, Forastero, and Sansón) (c) by pinfall | Trios match for the AAA World Trios Championship | 11:11 |
| 5 | Octagón Jr., Vampiro, and Pagano defeated Daga, El Texano Jr., and Taurus by disqualification | Trios match | — |
| 6 | Sam Adonis, Cibernético, and Gringo Loco defeated El Hijo del Vikingo, Alberto El Patrón, and Psycho Clown by pinfall | No Disqualification trios match | 16:29 |
(c) / – the champion(s) heading into the match; D / – this was a dark match
