= El Domo =

Arena in San Luis Potosi City

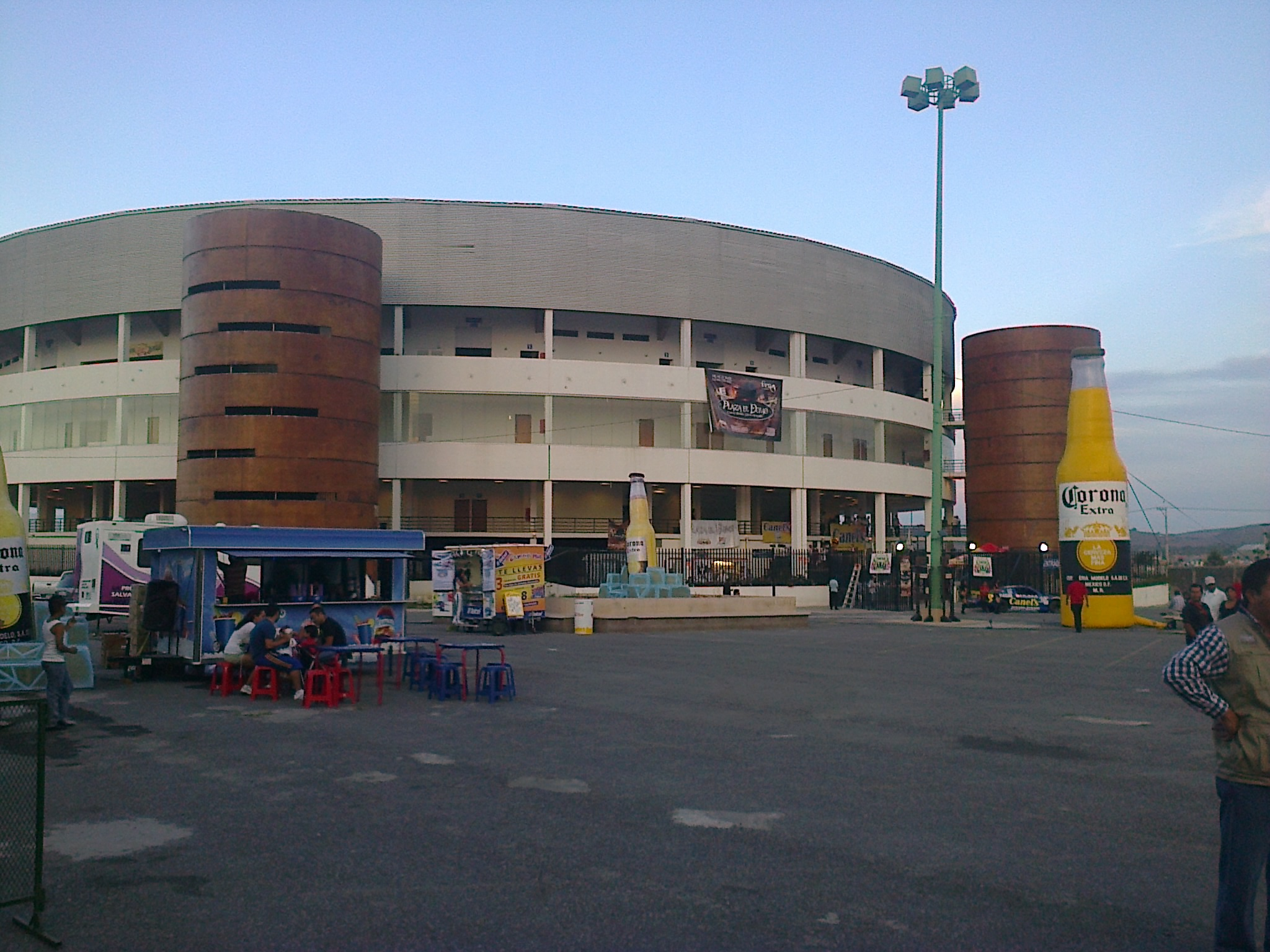
El Domo

El Domo is an 11,000-seat indoor arena located in San Luis Potosi City. It is used primarily for bullfighting and concerts, but can also accommodate other events, including circuses, lucha libre, ice hockey, basketball and other special events. The arena contains 32 luxury suites, each containing 18 seats, plus parking for 9,000 cars. There are four interior ramps and two elevators in the arena. The arena concourse includes 40 points of sale and eight concession stands.

The arena opened in 2010 and displaced Auditorio Miguel Barragan as San Luis Potosi's primary indoor venue. Luis Miguel, Gloria Trevi, Yuri, El Bando de Recodo, Aracely Arambula, Lorena Herrera and Los Tigres del Norte have performed here since it opened. It has been the site of CMLL matches and several preseason basketball games.
