= Parker Boudreaux =

American professional wrestler (born 1998)

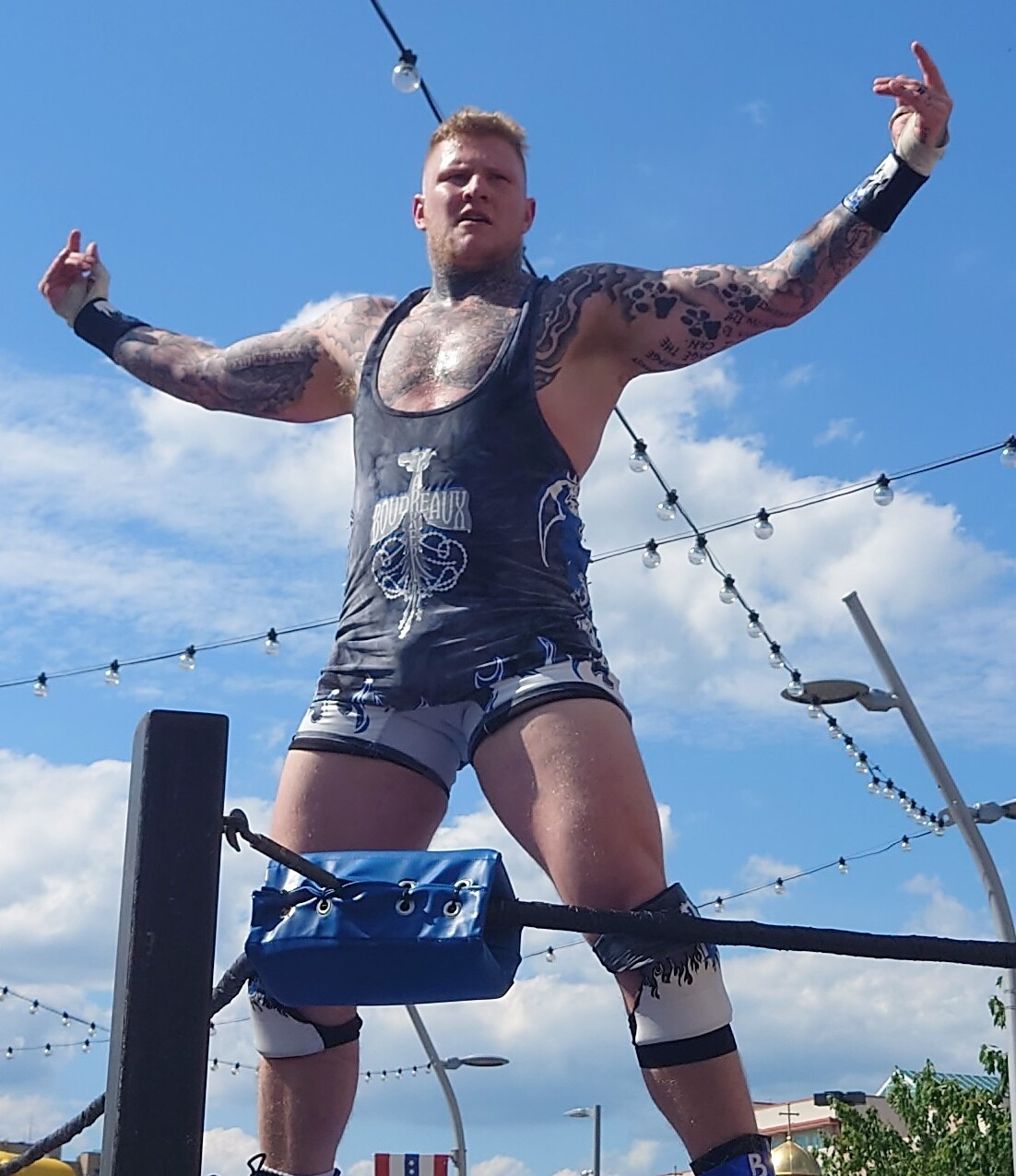
- Boudreaux in July 2024

Personal information
- Born: Parker Boudreaux; March 9, 1998 (age 28) Winter Garden, Florida, U.S.
- Education: University of Central Florida

Professional wrestling career
- Ring names: Harland; Parker Boudreaux
- Billed height: 6 ft 4 in (193 cm)
- Billed weight: 301 lb (137 kg)
- Trained by: Cima; Gleat Dojo; Matt Bloom; WWE Performance Center
- Debut: December 14, 2021

Parker Boudreaux (born March 9, 1998) is an American professional wrestler. He has primarily worked for the Japanese promotion Gleat since October 2024. He also worked for WWE on its NXT brand under the ring name Harland from 2021 to 2022, and All Elite Wrestling under his real name from 2022 to 2024.

== Early life ==
Boudreaux was born in Winter Garden, Florida, on March 9, 1998. Growing up in Orlando, Florida, he played football and attended Bishop Moore Catholic High School. He helped Bishop Moore to a 14–1 record and a Florida Class 5A championship, the school’s first state title since 1970. A highly decorated football recruit, he gained numerous awards and accolades, most notably being named a 2015 MaxPreps First Team All-American, an Associated Press Class All-State First-Team selection, and the 5A Florida Athletic Coaches Association (FACA) Player of the Year. Boudreaux was the nation’s No. 13-ranked offensive guard by 247Sports. A four-star recruit by ESPN and Rivals.com. Boudreaux was originally recruited and offered by over 75 schools and eventually committed to play football for Notre Dame, where he redshirt his freshman year. A year later he transferred to University of Central Florida (UCF), playing football from 2017–2020.

== Collegiate football career ==
Parker Boudreaux
No. 61
- Position: Offensive Line

Personal information
- Listed height: 6 ft 4 in (1.93 m)
- Listed weight: 301 lb (137 kg)

Career information
- High school: Bishop Moore Catholic High School
- College: Notre Dame (2016) UCF (2017–2020)

Awards and highlights
- Colley National Champion (2017); Peach Bowl Champion; AAC champion (2017); AAC Champion (2018); Pro Football Focus National Team of the Week Second-team selection

As he did in high school in Orlando, Boudreaux continued to play offensive line at Notre Dame but sat out redshirting his freshman year. He transferred in 2017 to UCF and was a member of the UCF Knights football team during his freshman year in 2017, and won that year's Colley national championship.

In 2018, he played in 12 games and helped the Knights break the single-season rushing record. Boudreaux was known as a key player and a leader on the offensive line. In 2019, he started in all 13 games at right guard. Boudreaux played a key role on the line as UCF rated first in the AAC in scoring, passing, and total offense and third in rushing in the nation. Boudreaux did not play his last season due to a concussion. Boudreaux ended up never giving up a single sack in his college career as a UCF Knight.

== Professional wrestling career ==
=== WWE (2021–2022) ===
Boudreaux signed a development contract with WWE in 2021. On the October 12 episode of NXT, Boudreaux debuted for the NXT brand as the enforcer to Joe Gacy. Boudreaux made his in-ring debut under the ring name Harland on the December 14 episode, defeating Guru Raaj. Harland's final appearance in WWE came on the March 1 episode of NXT where he defeated Draco Anthony before he was released on April 1, 2022.

=== All Elite Wrestling (2022–2024) ===
In July 2022, Boudreaux, under his real name, began to appear on All Elite Wrestling's (AEW) programs Dark, Dark: Elevation, and Rampage with Ari Daivari and Slim J as part of a stable named The Trustbusters. In August, he signed a contract with AEW. He made his Dynamite debut on December 21, 2022, aligning with Swerve Strickland as a new member of Strickland's stable, Mogul Affiliates. In June 2023, it was reported that Boudreaux had suffered an injury and would be out of action. He was released in April 2024.

=== Independent circuit (2022, 2024–present) ===
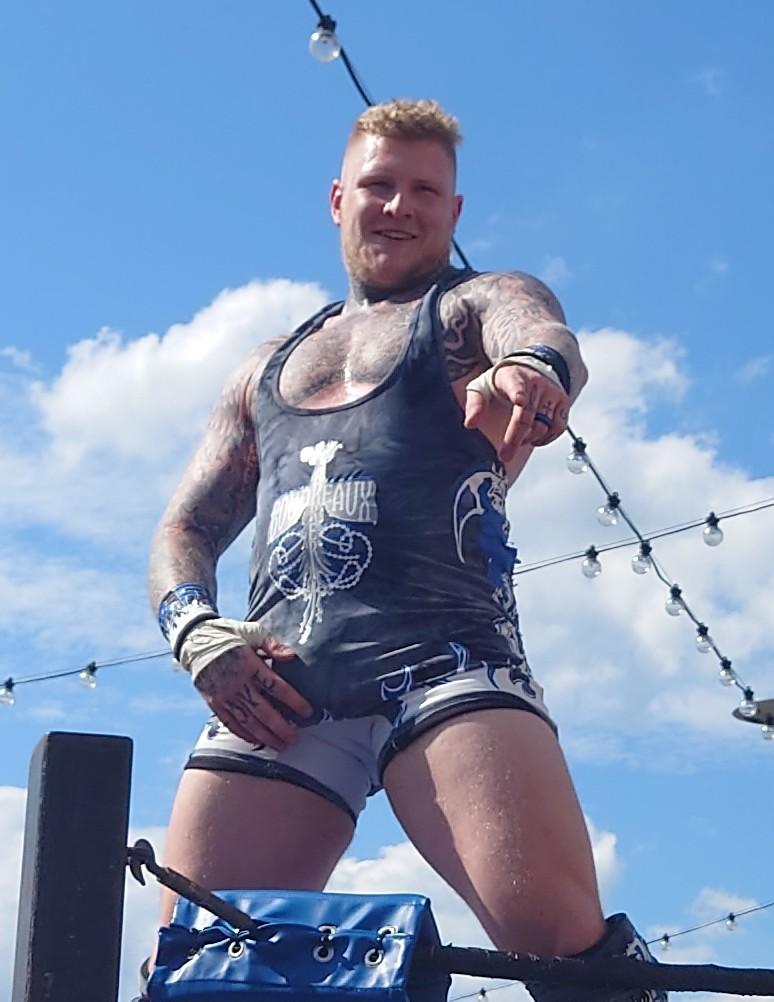
Boudreaux at a Regatta Pro Wrestling event in Charleston, West Virginia in July 2024.

In June 2022, after his release from WWE, Boudreaux briefly worked with Major League Wrestling. While still under contract with AEW in early 2024, Boudreaux made his debut for Lucha Libre AAA Worldwide (AAA) by attacking Octagon Jr. He wrestled in multi-men matches at Triplemanía XXXII: Monterrey and Triplemanía XXXII: Tijuana. Following his release from AEW, he began working on the independent circuit.

Boudreaux made his debut in Japan with Gleat on October 6, 2024, where he unsuccessfully challenged Hayato Tamura for the G-Rex Championship. Boudreaux teamed up with Cima a month later in November, calling themselves the "Boudreaux Brothers", with Cima temporarily changing his name to "Marcy Boudreaux". Boudreaux had also began training in the Gleat Dojo in 2024. On February 22, 2025, Boudreaux and Cima teamed up again where they unsuccessfully challenged Hartley Jackson and Kotaro Suzuki in Korakuen Hall. In July 2025, Gleat president Hiroyuki Suzuki praised Boudreaux and called him the "greatest fighter in the world".

On January 25, 2026, at Continental Wrestling Entertainment (CWE)'s Maithan Mania event in Dhanbad, Jharkhand, India, Boudreaux defeated JT Baba in a no disqualification match to win the CWE World Heavyweight Championship, marking his first championship in his career. Following the title win, Boudreaux was confronted by CWE founder and WWE Hall of Famer The Great Khali, who attacked him with a chop and chair, resulting in Boudreaux requiring stitches. He lost the title six days later to Shivam Thakur. On April 24 at Oceania Pro Wrestling (OPW), Boudreux defeated Shanky Singh to win the vacant OPW Global Championship.

== Championships and accomplishments ==
- Continental Wrestling Entertainment
  - CWE World Heavyweight Championship (1 time)
- Oceania Pro Wrestling
  - OPW Global Championship (1 time, current)
