= Auditorio Benito Juárez =

Arena in Veracruz, Mexico

Coordinates: 19.1783°N 96.1357°W

Auditorio Benito Juarez is a 4,000-seat indoor arena located in Veracruz, Veracruz, Mexico. It was built in 1972 and renovated in 2004. It is the home of the Halcones Rojos de Veracruz basketball team, and one of two LNBP arenas named in honor of Benito Juárez. (The other is Poliforum Benito Juarez in Cancún.)

When used for concerts and other special events, the Auditorio can hold up to 4,500. The play Aventurera has been presented here several times. Additionally, Anahí, Angélica María, Lupita D'Alessio, Rocío Dúrcal, Alicia Villarreal, Alejandro Fernández, Joan Sebastian, Alejandra Guzmán, Triple, Wisin & Yandel, Maná, Luis Miguel, Gloria Trevi, Pepe Aguilar and Zoé are among the many acts who have performed at this arena. Boxing and Lucha libre matches have been held here. It has hosted circuses, trade shows and other special events.

Auditorio Benito Juarez is considered to be one of the LNBP's best arenas. There are plans for a new 10,000-seat arena in Veracruz, which could send most major concerts to the new facility.
