= La Secta (professional wrestling) =

Professional wrestling stable

Stable
- Members: Cibernético (leader); Dark Ozz; Dark Cuervo; Dark Escoria; Dark Espíritu
- Name(s): La Secta; La Secta Cibernética; La Secta Diabólica; La Secta del Mesías; La Secta de Muerta; La Secta Bizarra Cibernetica
- Former members: Billy el Malo; Charly Manson; Chessman; Mari Apache; Muerte Cibernética/Asesor Cibernético/El Mesías; Taboo
- Debut: 2005

La Secta was a religious cult-like stable that has existed in AAA since late 2005 under four different names.

== La Secta Cibernética ==
The original stable was formed around the promotion's number one rudo Cibernético and was known as La Secta Cibernética (a play on words, meaning both "The Sect of Cibernético" and "The Cybernetic Sect" in English). The group was formed in late 2005 when Cibernético along with his longtime partners in crime Chessman and Charly Manson recruited The Black Family to join together and form the La Secta super stable. La Secta’s first and primary feud was with La Parka (the AAA version) who led a group of técnicos in the gang war. This led to a Luchas de Apuestas match between La Parka and Cibernético at Triplemanía XII where La Parka defeated Cibernético and forced him to unmask. After the loss of the mask Cibernético became more and more obsessed with defeating La Parka, he even brought in Muerte Cibernética to target La Parka. Shortly after bringing Muerte Cibernética into the group Cibernético suffered a knee injury that would put him out of action for the remainder of 2006. The feud between Muerta Cibernética and La Parka climaxed at Triplemanía XIV where La Parka unmasked Muerta Cibernética as well.

After the unmasking and being revealed as Ricky Banderas he changed his name to "Asesor Cibernético" and targeted La Secta’s old leader, blaming him for the stable’s bad luck.

== La Secta Diabólica ==
With Cibernético out of the group La Secta became La Secta Diabólica (The Diabolical Sect) with Asesor Cibernético as their leader. La Secta soon saw Cibernético's old partners Chessman and Charly Manson turn técnico and side with Cibernético building a new faction war. Cibernético and Asesor Cibernético faced off at Guerra de Titanes 2006 in a match that saw Cibernético beat his opponent in a casket match and then have his group come out and carry Asesor Cibernético's coffin to a nearby lagoon, where he was given a Viking funeral and thrown into the lagoon (which many outlets believed was Cibernético throwing Asesor Cibernético into a volcano, due to the TV transmission interspersing the Viking funeral with shots from volcanic eruptions and lava). This was of course a storyline, mainly designed to let Ricky Banderas return to Puerto Rico. With Asesor Cibernético supposedly dead the Black Family carried on the stable name.

== La Secta del Mesías ==
A few months after the "death" of Asesor Cibernético, Ricky Banderas returned at the annual Rey de Reyes event, using the name "El Mesías" (playing off the storyline that he returned from the dead). Once Mesías returned to AAA the stable was renamed La Secta del Mesías (English: The sect of the Messiah). La Secta became the dominant rudo stable in AAA and started another feud with Cibernético and his partners.

== La Secta ==
In the summer of 2008, it looked like there was rift growing in between La Secta leader El Mesias and Ozz. This would come to a head when El Mesias was booted from La Secta in September 2008 for losing to long-time rival Vampiro in a cage match. Since that point Ozz took control of the rest of the Dark Family to remake that stable from the rubble that was La Secta.

== La Secta Bizarra Cibernetica ==
On August 18, 2012, Cibernético combined his two previous stables, Los Bizarros and La Secta, to form La Secta Bizarra Cibernetica, continuing his rivalry with the Los Perros del Mal stable. On August 2, 2013, Cuervo, Escoria, Espiritu and Ozz all turned on Cibernético, forming a new rudo version of La Secta. On August 30, Mari Apache joined La Secta, becoming its first female member. La Secta then started a feud with its two former leaders, Cibernético and El Mesías, as well as El Hijo del Perro Aguayo.

== Championships and accomplishments ==
Titles won by wrestlers when they were a member of the stable, title wins before or after are only listed on their individual pages

- aaa

- AAA Mega Championship (1 time) – El Mesias
- AAA World Tag Team Championship (1 time) – El Cuervo and Ozz
- IWC World Heavyweight Championship (1 time) – El Mesias††
- GPCW SUPER-X Monster Title (1 time) – El Mesias†††
- Mexican National Atómicos Championship (1 time) - Ozz, Escoria, Cuervo and Espiritu (1)†
- Mexican National Heavyweight Championship (1 time) – Charley Manson†

†title recognized and promoted mainly in AAA, but technically not the sole property of AAA.
††Not to be mistaken for the title defended in the Grupo Internacional Revolución promotion
†††Title originally created for another promotion that folded after one show, was used in AAA after that.
