= Chessman (wrestler) =

Mexican professional wrestler

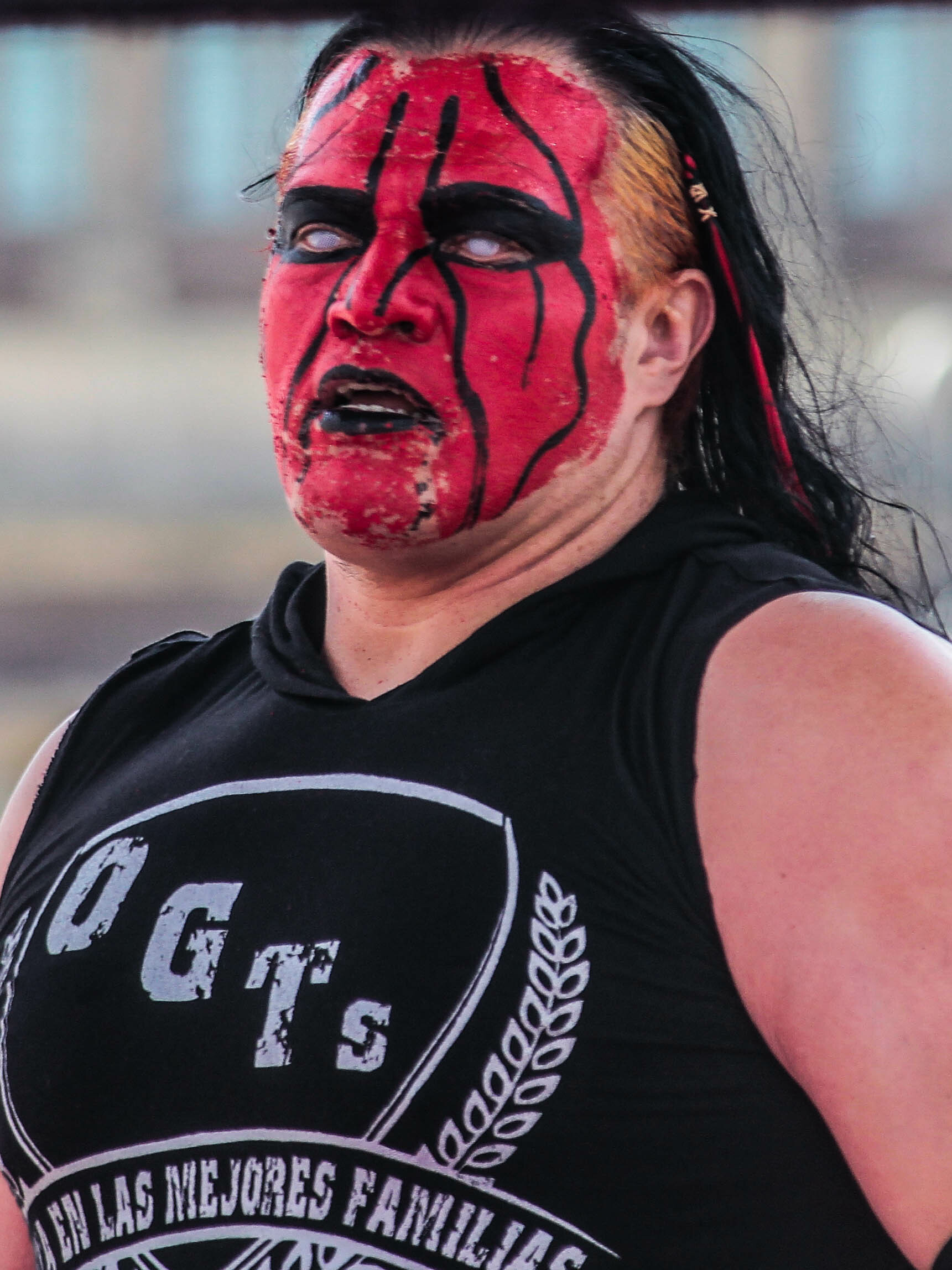
- Chessman during an outdoor event in 2018

Personal information
- Born: Kevin Citlali Zamora; June 2, 1975 (age 51) Villa Nicolás Romero, Mexico State, Mexico

Professional wrestling career
- Ring name(s): Chessman; M-357; Magnum; Quinto Elemento
- Billed height: 1.83 m (6 ft 0 in)
- Billed weight: 105 kg (231 lb)
- Trained by: El Canek; Pepe Casas
- Debut: July 3, 1996

Kevin Citlali Zamora (born June 2, 1975) is a Mexican professional wrestler, better known under his ring name Chessman. He is signed to promotion Lucha Libre AAA Worldwide (AAA). Throughout his career, Chessman has been a part of several factions, such as The Black Family, Lucha Libre Latina (LLL), La Secta Cibernetica, La Secta del Mesías and Los Hell Brothers. Chessman has been associated with Cibernético and Charly Manson in one way or the other throughout most of his career, either teaming with them or wrestling against them.

== Professional wrestling career ==
After training with Mexican professional wrestler legend El Canek and the father of the Casas family Pepe Casas (father of Negro Casas, Heavy Metal and El Felino), Zamora made his debut on July 3, 1995 working as an enmascarado (the Mexican term for a masked wrestler) using the name M-357, which was inspired by the .357 Magnum revolver cartridge. In 1996, he renamed himself Magnum, which was again inspired by the same gun cartridge. In 1998, he completely changed his character and became Quinto Elemento (Spanish for "Fifth Element"). In 2000, he changed his character once again, this time working unmasked but instead with his face painted red and black, using the name Chessman and adopting a Goth-inspired look. The name came from famous criminal Caryl Chessman and the red face paint was supposed to symbolize the blood of his many victims.

=== The Black Family ===
In 2001, Chessman made his AAA debut as part of a new stable called the Black Family, alongside its leader Charly Manson, Ozz, Escoria and Cuervo. The Black Family soon became a part of Lucha Libre Latina (LLL), the Mexican version of the New World Order, a group led by Chessman's long time friend Cibernético. Even though they were part of a much larger group, the Black Family still worked as a unit, a stable within the stable.

The Black Family made their first major show appearance at Verano de Escandalo (2001) where they lost an elimination match to Los Vatos Locos (Espiritu, Nygma, Silver Cat and Picudo); also in the match were Los Vipers (Psicosis II, Histeria, Maniaco and Mosco de la Merced) and Los Exoticos. The team did not make another major show appearance until a year later when they unsuccessfully challenged Los Vatos Locos for the Mexican National Atómicos Championship at Verano de Escandalo (2002). That challenge was the first of many as the Black Family began chasing the Atómicos title and feuding with Los Vatos Locos. On April 19, 2002, Chessman teamed up with fellow LLL stable mate Electroshock to defeat the team of La Parka, Jr. and Mascara Sagrada to win the Mexican National Tag Team Championship. When Los Vatos Locos lost the titles to someone else in late 2002, the Black Family started to target the new champions Oscar Sevilla and Los Barrio Boys (Alan, Billy Boy and Decnnis). When Charly Manson returned to action he sided with Los Vipers instead of the Black Family, leading to a match at Guerra de Titanes 2002, where the Black Family defeated Manson, Histeria, Mosco de la Merced, and Psicosis II. On July 18, 2003, the Black Family won their first championship as a unit when they defeated Oscar Sevilla and Los Barrio Boys for the Atómicos title, but their run only lasted 31 days before Sevilla and Los Barrio Boys regained the titles. Chessman's run of bad luck continued as Octagón and La Parka won the Mexican National Tag Team titles from Chessman and Electroshock. The Black Family would wait over a year before they got another opportunity to hold the titles as they won them on August 20, 2004.

=== La Secta ===
In 2005, Cibernético formed a new group called La Secta Cibernetica that included his friends Charly Manson and Chessman and, through Chessman's membership, the Black Family was also invited to join this new super group. The group assisted Cibernético in his fight with La Parka (the AAA version), being unable to prevent him from being unmasked at Triplemania XII. Later in the year, Muerta Cibernetica was brought in to get revenge on La Parka. When Cibernético suffered a severe knee injury, Muerta Cibernetica took over the group and kicked Cibernético out. Chessman teamed up with Tiffany to win the AAA World Mixed Tag Team Championship on September 16, 2003 from Chessman's former tag team partner Electroshock and Lady Apache. The team held the Mixed titles until Gran Apache and Faby Apache defeated them for the titles on August 1, 2004, after which Chessman stopped teaming with Tiffany. Muerta Cibernetica, like Cibernético two years later, was himself unmasked by La Parka at Triplemania XIV. After holding the Atómicos titles for 789 days, the Black Family lost to the Mexican Powers (Crazy Boy, Juventud Guerrera, Joe Líder and Psicosis II) on October 18, 2006. Not long after they lost the tag team titles Chessman turned face (called "Technicó" in Mexico) and sided with Cibernético and Charly Manson to form "Los Hell Brothers".

=== Los Hell Brothers ===
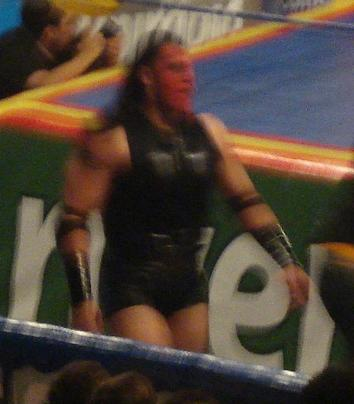
Chessman during the Guerra de Titanes (2009) event

When Cibernetico returned to the ring after a long absence due to injuries, he formed the stable Los Hell Brothers along with longtime friends Cibernético and Charly Manson. The group quickly became the top technicós group due to their battles with La Secta del Mesías and Konnan's La Legión Extranjera (Foreign Legion). At Rey de Reyes (2007), Los Hell Brothers defeated Muerta Cibernetica, Scott Steiner and Kenzo Suzuki. At the annual Triplemania, Triplemania XV, Los Hell Brothers were once again successful in their fight against La Legión Extranjera as they defeated El Mesias, Sean Waltman, and Kenzo Suzuki in a Domo De La Muerte cage match. Because of their victory, Los Hell Brothers forced Kenzo Susuki to have his head shaved due to his loss. In August 2007, Chessman defeated Los Hell Brothers ally El Zorro to win the UWA World Light Heavyweight Championship. The title win was a first round match of a tournament to crown the first ever AAA Mega Champion. In the second round, Chessman defeated his teammate Cibernético and earned a spot in the finals. At Verano de Escandalo (2007), Chessman faced El Mesias in the finals but lost the match due to disqualification and thus also lost his UWA title. On that same show, El Zorro turned on Los Hell Brothers and joined La Legión after the team won the main event.

In December 2007, Cibernético was badly burned during a match and had to take several months off to recover. While Cibernético recovered, Chessman and Charly Manson kept wrestling La Legión but without as much success as they had initially due to a series of unfortunate incidents where Chessman would cause the team to lose by accident. In the spring of 2008, Charly Manson suffered a serious injury and was forced to take some time off just as Cibernético made his return to the ring and won the AAA Mega title. At Triplemania XVI, Chessman teamed up with La Parka and Silver King in a losing effort to the La Legión team of Bobby Lashley, Electroshock and Kenzo Suzuki. When Vampiro was brought in to take Manson's place, rumors of a break-up of Los Hell Brothers began circulating. The rumors seemed to be reinforced when Chessman won an elimination match to earn a shot at the AAA Mega title. At first, Cibernético congratulated his partner but seemed reluctant to actually set a date for Chessman's title match. The tension came to a head in September when Cibernético came to the ring to congratulate Chessman on a recent win; Manson came to the ring to try and mediate between the two but, when he could not pick sides, the Hell Brothers officially disbanded.

=== Turning rudo ===
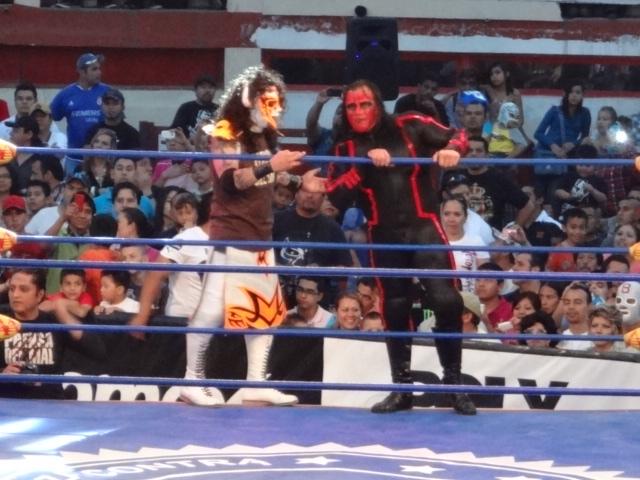
Chessman and fellow Legión Extranjera member Psicosis

With the split of Los Hell Brothers, Chessman became a "rudo" and the title match he earned was booked for Verano de Escandalo. On that night, Cibernético was able to retain the title but not without Chessman putting up a stiff fight. Chessman was granted another shot at the world title, this was in a match that also included El Zorro. The three men faced off at the Antonio Peña Memorial Show 2008 in a Street Fight where Cibernético won by pinning El Zorro.

In late 2008, Chessman made a move to seemingly unite with his former stable the Black Family, but double-crossed them instead. Chessman turned to the Psycho Circus and together they won the National Atómicos Titles from the Black Family. Chessman's third run with the Atómicos titles ended after just 16 days when AAA Commissioner Vampiro stripped Chessman and the Psycho Circus of the titles after they had attacked him the previous night. The feud with the Black Family continued into 2009 until Chessman segued into a feud with the new AAA World Champion El Mesias. The feud with El Mesias started during a television taping where Chessman and El Mesias faced off in a match; the match got so out of hand that Chessman ended up being thrown over the side of the balcony and through a stack of tables. The show went to commercial with Chessman looking seriously injured as he received medical treatment. The following week, another singles match between the two was scheduled but Chessman came out on crutches wearing a neck brace. Just as El Mesias thought Chessman was going to announce that he was too injured to wrestle, Chessman attacked him with a crutch revealing that the injury was nothing but a ruse to give Chessman an advantage. At Rey de Reyes (2009), Chessman challenged El Mesias for the AAA Mega title inside a Steel Cage but lost.

On March 12, 2010 Chessman competed for and won the 2010 Rey de Reyes tournament. In the first round, he outlasted La Parka, El Zorro and Octagón and in the finals, he defeated Hernandez and Marco Corleone to become the 2010 Rey de Reyes. In April 2011, Chessman joined forces with Silver King and Último Gladiador to form La Maniarquía, a subgroup within La Sociedad. On June 18 at Triplemanía XIX, La Maniarquía was defeated by Electroshock, Heavy Metal and Joe Líder in a Tables, Ladders and Chairs match. On September 16, Konnan rewarded Chessman by moving him back to La Legión Extranjera and naming him the group's new general. On October 9 at Héroes Inmortales, Chessman and Abyss defeated Extreme Tiger and Jack Evans in a Tables, Ladders, and Chairs match to win the AAA World Tag Team Championship. On August 5, 2012, at Triplemanía XX, Chessman teamed with Juventud Guerrera for one night to take part in a Parejas Suicidas steel cage match. However, both Chessman and Guerrera managed to escape the cage and avoid having to face each other in a Hair vs. Hair match. On October 7 at Héroes Inmortales, Chessman and Abyss lost the AAA World Tag Team Championship to Joe Líder and Vampiro, ending their reign at 364 days. On December 2 at Guerra de Titanes, Chessman won Vampiro's hair in a six-way steel cage Lucha de Apuestas, which also included Cibernético, Dr. Wagner, Jr., L.A. Park and El Hijo del Perro Aguayo.

On March 16, 2014, at Rey de Reyes, Chessman defeated Villano IV to win the vacant AAA Latin American Championship. On September 26, Chessman and Cibernético reformed Los Hell Brothers with new member Averno. In February 2015, Los Hell Brothers officially joined La Sociedad. On June 14, 2015, at Verano de Escándalo, Los Hell Brothers won the AAA World Trios Championship. On August 31, Chessman lost the Latin American Championship to Psycho Clown. After Cibernético left AAA, Los Hell Brothers were stripped of the Trios Championship on January 6, 2016. On January 22 at Guerra de Titanes, Chessman and Averno won the vacant AAA World Tag Team Championship. However, immediately afterwards, La Sociedad turned on the two. Chessman and Averno lost the AAA World Tag Team Championship to Angélico and Jack Evans on July 17, 2016. Chessman and Averno then paired up with Ricky Marvin to form a new trio named OGT, winning the AAA World Trios Championship on November 4. They lost the title to El Apache, Faby Apache and Mary Apache on March 5, 2017, when Marvin was defeated by Faby in a singles match.

== Championships and accomplishments ==
- Lucha Libre AAA Worldwide
  - AAA Latin American Championship (1 time)
  - AAA World Mixed Tag Team Championship (1 time) – with Tiffany
  - AAA World Tag Team Championship (2 times) – with Abyss (1) and Averno (1)
  - AAA World Trios Championship (3 times) – with Averno and Cibernético (1), Averno and Ricky Marvin (1), and Averno and Super Fly (1)
  - Mexican National Tag Team Championship (1 time) – with Electroshock
  - Mexican National Atómicos Championship (3 times) – with Ozz, Escoria and Cuervo (2) and Killer Clown, Psycho Clown and Zombie Clown (1)
  - Rey de Reyes (2010)
- Pro Wrestling Illustrated
  - PWI ranked him #133 of the top 500 singles wrestlers in the PWI 500 in 2010
- Other accomplishments
  - UWA World Light Heavyweight Championship (1 time)

== Luchas de Apuestas record ==
Winner (wager)	Loser (wager)	Location	Event	Date	Notes
Chessman (hair)	El Brazo (hair)	N/A	Live event	N/A	
Latin Lover (hair)	Chessman (hair)	Naucalpan, State of Mexico	Verano de Escándalo	September 18, 2005	(Note: This was a four-way "electrified" steel cage match that also included Cibernético and Shocker.)
El Zorro (hair)	Chessman (hair)	Naucalpan, State of Mexico	Antonio Peña Memorial Show	October 7, 2007	(Note: This was a six-man Domo De La Muerte match that also included Abismo Negro, Electroshock, Cibernético and El Intocable.)
Chessman (hair)	Electroshock (hair)	Nuevo Laredo	Live event	September 1, 2008	
Chessman (hair)	Electroshock (hair)	Monterrey, Nuevo León	Heroes Inmortales III	September 26, 2009	(Note: Was originally scheduled to face Charly Manson but he quit AAA before the match.)
Chessman (hair)	Vampiro (hair)	Zapopan, Jalisco	Guerra de Titanes	December 2, 2012	(Note: Six-way steel cage match, which also included Cibernético, Dr. Wagner, Jr., L.A. Park and El Hijo del Perro Aguayo)
Los OGTs (hair) (Averno, Chessman and Super Fly)	El Nuevo Poder del Norte (hair) (Carta Brava Jr., Mocho Cota Jr. and Tito Santana)	Monterrey, Nuevo León	Verano de Escándalo	June 3, 2018	
Chessman (hair)	Joe Líder (hair)	Nezahualcoyotl, Mexico	AAA show	January 1, 2020	(Note: The last two men in a nine-man steel cage match that also included Pagano, Texano Jr., Mr. Águila, Máximo, Mocho Cota Jr., Carta Brava Jr., and Averno.)
Pagano (hair)	Chessman (hair)	Ciudad de Mexico	Triplemanía XXVIII	December 12, 2020	
