= El Mesías =

Puerto Rican professional wrestler

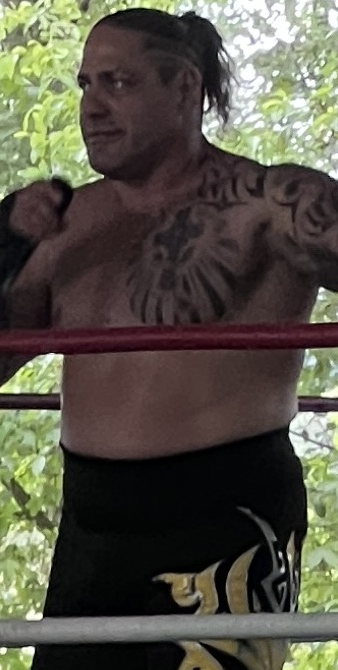
- El Mesías in 2026

Personal information
- Born: Gilbert Cosme Ramírez; May 25, 1975 (age 51) Bayamón, Puerto Rico

Professional wrestling career
- Ring name(s): Asesor Cibernetica; El Mesías; El Mega Triple Campeón de AAA; Gilbert el Boricua; Judas Mesias; Mil Muertes; King Muertes; Muerte Cibernética; Ricky Banderas
- Billed height: 6 ft 1 in (1.85 m)
- Billed weight: 245 lb (111 kg)
- Billed from: Bayamón, Puerto Rico; The Depths of Hell; Parts Unknown; Beyond the Grave (as Mil Muertes)
- Trained by: El Mecanico
- Debut: 1997

Gilbert Cosme Ramírez (born May 25, 1975), better known by his ring name El Mesías (transl. The Messiah), is a Puerto Rican professional wrestler. He is signed to Lucha Libre AAA Worldwide (AAA).

Cosme began his career in the International Wrestling Association (IWA) based in Puerto Rico, under the ring name Ricky Banderas. While performing in the company, he won the IWA World Heavyweight Championship five times and held minor championships on fifteen separate occasions, before leaving the company in 2006. On March 12, 2006, he debuted in Lucha Libre AAA Worldwide (AAA), a promotion based in Mexico, as a character named Muerte Cibernética and was involved in an angle where this character was "killed". In November 2006, Cosme was featured in the tapings of the Wrestling Society X television series, where he was the second and last wrestler to win the WSX Championship.

Following a month of performing in the International Wrestling Association, Cosme returned to AAA in a special event, this time under the ring name of El Mesías. In September 2007, the company organized a unification tournament where all the champions and first contenders participated. Over the course of the tournament, he won the GPCW Super-X Monster Championship and IWC World Heavyweight Championship, and on the tournament's finale, he became the first wrestler to win the AAA Mega Championship. While working in Mexico, Cosme signed a contract with Total Nonstop Action Wrestling (TNA) where he debuted as Judas Mesias in September 2007. In March 2008, his association with TNA came to an end and he focused most of his time on AAA. In 2010, Cosme debuted for Puerto Rican World Wrestling Council, where he won the Universal Heavyweight Championship. He also wrestled in Lucha Underground under the ring name Mil Muertes. He reprised the role in Major League Wrestling (MLW), as King Muertes.

Outside of his work within these promotions, Cosme has represented Puerto Rico as a member of Team Rest of the World in the 2015 Lucha Libre World Cup and as the captain of Team International in the 2013 World Cup of Wrestling.

== Professional wrestling career ==
=== International Wrestling Association (1999–2009) ===
Cosme began training in 1996, when he was instructed by a former wrestler. During this time, he enrolled in the Interamerican University of Puerto Rico located in Bayamón. His major was in computer technology, but after completing two years of study, he decided to begin wrestling full time after meeting Víctor Quiñones. In 1997, after working in the independent circuit, he moved to Mexico and became involved in a project to develop Hispanic talent organized by the World Wrestling Federation (WWF).

Cosme subsequently debuted in the International Wrestling Association (IWA) in 1999. He was given the gimmick of "El Patriota" Ricky Banderas, a name that, according to Cosme, was created by fusing the artistic names of Latin musician Ricky Martín and actor Antonio Banderas. He debuted in Extreme Championship Wrestling (ECW) on that year, working a televised match. Following a period of teaming with Los Boricuas, his character was teamed with Germán Figueroa, who wrestled as Gran Apolo and formed a tag team dubbed La Nueva Generacion, which won the IWA Tag Team Championship three times. On August 21, 2000, in a show in Levittown, Puerto Rico, Cosme's character turned on Gran Apolo. Following this, he joined the company's dominant heel stable, Los Intocables, along with Miguel Pérez and Jesús Castillo. After the stable's dissolution, he was involved in another stable named Starr Corporation, where after Cosme's insistence his character became darker and was renamed "El Mesías" Ricky Banderas. Following this, he teamed up with Shane Sewell in a stable known as Los Hermanos en Dolor. In 2001, Cosme had a tryout match for the WWF and performed in Frontier Martial-Arts Wrestling's 12th Anniversary Show pay-per-view event. He won the IWA heavyweight title for a third time on June 15, 2002, and remained champion until Ray González debuted with the company as "Rey Fénix", in a match that he describes as the best match he had wrestled thus far.

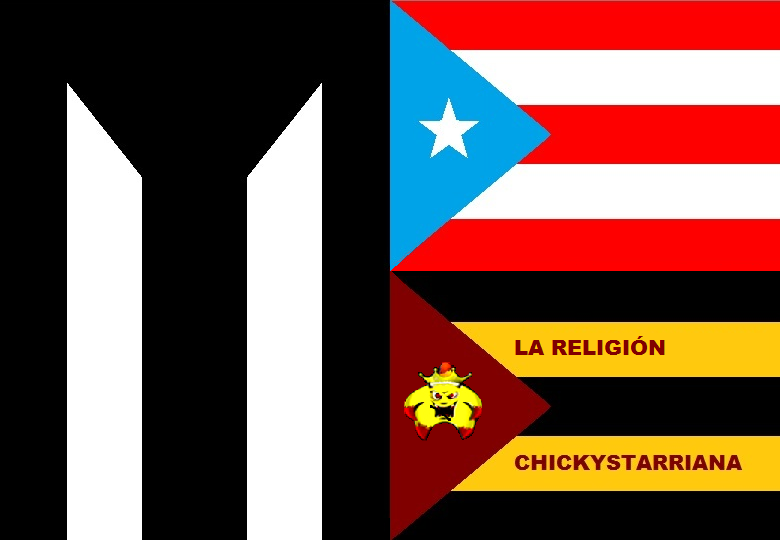
In reference to his ring name, Cosme served as the standard-bearer for his factions early in his career.

Cosme's gimmick underwent another change when he joined then-dominant heel stable La Compañía, led by Savio Vega. This was followed by his fourth title run after he defeated Gran Apolo on January 6, 2003. He was booked as a heel until October 9, 2003, when Vega's group turned on him. Following this, he feuded with Christopher Kindred under his "Slash Venom" gimmick, which peaked when Vampiro was brought by the company to form a stable which feuded with Gran Apolo and Venom. In 2004, he feuded with Hangman Hughes, Kasey James, El Diamante and Bison. In 2005, he turned heel again, this time leading a stable known as La Cruz del Diablo which feuded with other groups led by Vega and González. Following an angle where he feuded over a number one contender spot, Cosme departed from the company and signed a contract to wrestle in Mexico. He continued making sporadic appearances for the company, including a brief stint in 2007. On July 19, 2009, Cosme was booked to defeat Dennis Rivera in the promotion's tenth anniversary event.

=== Lucha Libre AAA Worldwide (2006–2018) ===
Following the culmination of his contract with the International Wrestling Association, Cosme signed a contract with Lucha Libre AAA Worldwide (AAA). He debuted on March 12, 2006, as "Muerte Cibernética", a rudo (heel) enforcer supposedly brought to the company by Cibernético to feud with "La Parka". This gimmick consisted of Cosme wearing a traditional Mexican wrestling mask, often a modified version of the one used by La Parka. This character feuded with La Parka for several months. This angle came to a conclusion at Triplemania XIV, where Cosme's character was booked to lose a Mask vs. Mask match.

Following a legitimate injury suffered by Cibernético, Cosme's gimmick was slightly changed, launching into an angle where he pursued the leadership of Cibernético's stable, which then went by the name of La Secta Cibernetica. The character was booked to be the leader of the stable after supposedly convincing several members of the group to join him and changing the name of the group to La Secta Diabólica. The events of the angle were used to hype an eventual feud between López and Cosme's characters that took place in December 2006. In the angle, Cosme won the first match between the two with help from his stable. The angle culminated in a Casket match. Cibernético was booked to win the match and subsequently "kill" his opponent by throwing him into an active volcano. This was used to explain Cosme's absence when he departed from the company to wrestle in the International Wrestling Association. During this time, he also wrestled for Panama Wrestling Crew in Panama and in Ecuador.

Following a month of performing in Puerto Rico, Cosme returned to AAA in an annual event entitled Rey de Reyes under a new gimmick, changing his name to El Mesías. From then on, he started to get a bigger push as a main event heel, feuding with Cibernético and his stable Los Hell Brothers. During the feud, Cosme was both leader of La Secta del Mesías and member of La Legión Extranjera. Later, Cosme took both the IWC heavyweight championship from Cibernético and the GPCW SUPER-X Monster Title from La Parka in the preliminary rounds of the AAA Mega Championship tournament. As Mesías, he became the first wrestler to win the AAA Mega Championship in AAA's pay-per-view event Verano de Escandalo, after defeating Chessman by disqualification. On November 29, 2007, he successfully defended the company's championship in a triple threat match at the Guerra de Titanes pay-per-view. In March 2008, he returned to AAA after several months of inactivity. On March 16, 2008, Cosme dropped the championship to Cibernético. He was subsequently involved in an angle with Vampiro, leading to a match at Triplemania XVI, which concluded as a time-limit draw. On October 24, 2008, Cosme won the Copa Antonio Peña, defeating six other wrestlers in the process. Joaquín Roldán presented the relevant trophy. On December 6, 2008, at Guerra de Titanes, Cosme won the AAA Heavyweight Championship for a second time, defeating El Zorro. He also made a full técnico (face) turn, asking the fans for forgiveness for what he'd done while in AAA. On March 15, 2009, at Rey de Reyes, after successfully defending the AAA Mega Championship against Chessman, Dr. Wagner Jr. challenged him directly after the match. On June 13, 2009, he was booked to lose the title to Wagner at Triplemania XVII.

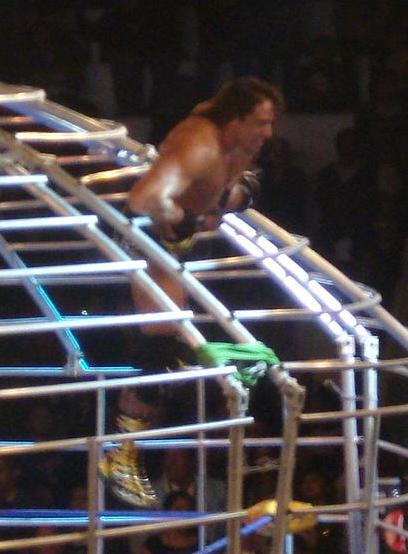
El Mesías leaving the Domo de la Muerte during Guerra de Titanes 2009

The feud continued for several months, until he regained the title on December 11, 2009, at the main event of Guerra de Titanes. Cosme's third reign as AAA Mega Champion ended on March 12, 2010, at Rey de Reyes. He was not booked to lose, but Electroshock submitted Mr. Anderson, the third wrestler in the match, to win the championship. Afterwards, El Mesías began feuding with invaders from Los Perros del Mal, the group's leader El Hijo del Perro Aguayo in particular. On August 14 at Verano de Escandalo, Aguayo, Damián 666 and L. A. Park defeated El Mesías, Cibernético and La Parka in a six-man tag team match, when Aguayo pinned Mesías after hitting him with a chair. On October 1 at Héroes Inmortales IV, El Mesías gained a measure of revenge on Aguayo by defeating him in a singles match. On November 1, El Mesías entered the 2010 Lucha Libre Premier tournament. The first two rounds of the tournament were wrestled in a parejas increibles format, with El Mesías teaming with Electroshock. The two would defeat the teams of Extreme Tiger and L. A. Park and Cibérnetico and Hernandez to make it to the semifinal four-way match, where El Mesías and El Zorro, defeated Electroshock and Dr. Wagner Jr. to advance to the finals. On November 28, El Mesías defeated El Zorro in the finals of the tournament to win the 2010 Lucha Libre Premier. Afterwards, Mesías entered a feud with La Sociedad member L. A. Park, who defeated him on December 5 at Guerra de Titanes, after using a chair on him. On March 18, 2011, at Rey de Reyes, El Mesías and Park were both eliminated from the finals of the tournament after brawling to a double countout. On May 18, El Mesías challenged, and Park accepted, for the two to end their feud at Triplemanía XIX in a Mask vs. Hair match. On June 18 at TripleManía XIX, Park defeated El Mesías, forcing him to have his head shaved. El Mesías returned to AAA a month later at Verano de Escándalo, saving Dr. Wagner Jr. from La Sociedad. On October 9 at Héroes Inmortales, El Mesías wrestled TNA wrestler Sting to a no contest in what was billed as a "dream match" by AAA, following interference from La Sociedad. The match had been put together by AAA Mega Champion Jeff Jarrett in an attempt to stop El Mesías from chasing his title. On December 16 at Guerra de Titanes, El Mesías defeated TNA wrestlers A.J. Styles and Rob Terry in back-to-back matches to become the number one contender to Jarrett's title. On March 18, 2012, at Rey de Reyes, El Mesías defeated Jarrett to win the AAA Mega Championship for the fourth time. On April 23, El Mesías underwent surgery on his arm; as a result, he was sidelined from in-ring action for three months. In storyline, El Hijo del Perro Aguayo was credited with causing the injury. El Mesías returned on July 13, attacking Aguayo and his Perros del Mal stable. On August 5 at Triplemanía XX, El Mesías successfully defended the AAA Mega Championship against Aguayo. He then went on to lose the title to El Texano Jr. on December 2 at Guerra de Titanes. On March 17, 2013, El Mesías defeated Canek and L. A. Park in the finals to win the 2013 Rey de Reyes tournament. In October, El Mesías came together with two former rivals, Cibernético and El Hijo del Perro Aguayo, to battle the Secta stable, after its members had turned on Cibernético. The partnership ended on December 8 at Guerra de Titanes, when Aguayo turned rudo, leading to the reformation of La Sociedad. On August 17, 2014, at Triplemanía XXII, El Mesías won fellow técnico Electroshock's hair in a six-way steel cage Lucha de Apuestas.

On March 6, 2015, El Mesías turned on Blue Demon Jr. and La Parka, completing his return to the rudo side. Shortly afterwards, he joined La Sociedad. On May 26, 2017, Mesías and Pagano won the AAA World Tag Team Championship, after defeating Dark Family (Cuervo and Scoria). Nine days later, at Verano de Escándalo, Dark Family won the titles back. At TripleManía XXV, Pagano and Mesías fought in a Street match that ended in a no-contest. In November 2017, Banderas suffered an injury in both knees. He made his return to the ring at Rey de Reyes, where he was defeated by La Parka. On March 21, 2018, Mesias officially announced his departure from the AAA company on his Facebook account, ending his 12-year run with the company. The following day, Banderas explained his departure, claiming he was very unhappy with the promotion. He claimed AAA "forced" him to work with a knee injury, his defeat against La Parka in his return match was "disrespectful" and apparently, he signed a contract with AAA where he was given the rights to the ring name "El Mesías" Ricky Banderas.

=== Wrestling Society X (2006) ===
Cosme participated as Banderas in the Wrestling Society X television series (taped in Los Angeles, California), with the gimmick of a disgruntled and kayfabe disfigured man pursuing a feud with Vampiro. The feud commenced after Banderas threw a fireball at Vampiro's face, which resulted in MTV pulling the episode from its original airdate, with concerns that viewers would try it at home.

In the following episode, Banderas explained that Vampiro rigged a casket with explosives during a match, with the explosion resulting in the damage to his face. On the eighth episode (which was taped on November 15, 2006) of the series, Banderas won the WSX Championship in his debut match for the promotion. Beforehand, he was involved in a series of brawls with Youth Suicide, as well as an allusion to a partnership with 6-Pac.

=== Total Nonstop Action Wrestling (2007–2008, 2013) ===
As noted on the "TNA Mobile" service, Cosme signed a contract with Total Nonstop Action Wrestling (TNA). Cosme was billed as James Mitchell's kayfabe son and thus Abyss' brother. Beginning on July 1, 2007, vignettes began airing for this "monster-like" character. His name was eventually billed as Judas Mesias. At No Surrender, he pulled Abyss under the ring by cutting a hole through the mat with a knife. On the September 13, 2007 episode of Impact!, during a submission match between Abyss and Kurt Angle in the Six Sides of Steel, Mesias made his official debut, climbing up from underneath the ring and attacking Abyss. On the September 20 episode of Impact!, Mesias defeated Eric Young in his debut match in TNA.

On September 21, 2007, it was reported that Cosme was suffering from sciatica and that treatment required several weeks of rest, followed by physical therapy. This injury was the result of a fall from a ladder during a championship match at AAA's Verano de Escandalo pay-per-view, which also knocked him out.

Mesias returned on the December 13, 2007, episode of Impact! where he strangled Abyss with a piece of barbed wire, which he also used to cut his forehead open. He then repeatedly hit Abyss in the head with a chair. He finished his assault by delivering his finisher, Straight to Hell, to Abyss on the same chair. In his TNA pay-per-view debut, Mesias defeated Abyss at Final Resolution after hitting Abyss with his finisher onto a barbed wire-wrapped steel chair. The feud continued at Against All Odds on February 10, 2008. They competed in a stipulation match called "Barbed Wire Massacre", where the ring was surrounded by barbed wire, which Abyss won with his finisher, the Black Hole Slam. In March, Cosme was released from his contract.

On March 18, 2013, Cosme made a one-night return to TNA to take part in the tapings of the TNA World Cup of Wrestling One Night Only pay-per-view. Working as Mesias, he represented Team International in a singles match, where he was defeated by Team United States' James Storm. At the tapings of the following day's Hardcore Justice 2 pay-per-view, Mesias, once again managed by James Mitchell, was defeated by Joseph Park in a Monster's Ball match.

=== World Wrestling Council (2009–2012) ===
An agreement between Cosme and the World Wrestling Council (WWC) was first rumored on November 26, 2009. The promotion made the official announcement two days later, including highlights of his career in a compilation video displayed during a special event titled Crossfire. His debut was scheduled for January 16, 2010, being booked as Ricky Banderas in a contest against Carly Colón. Ray González was subsequently included, winning a three-way-contest where the WWC's first winner of the "Wrestler of the Decade Cup" was to be decided. The following week, both were booked in a rematch, with Banderas winning the cup. On July 11, 2010, Banderas was booked to act as special referee at Aniversario 2010, but was subsequently included in a stipulation match against Colón. His character made a heel turn in this event, attacking both Colón and Hugo Savinovich. On January 8, 2011, Banderas defeated Colón, with help from an interfering Shane Sewell, to win the WWC Universal Heavyweight Championship for the first time. Cosme was stripped of the title upon returning to the IWA, headlining an angle that revisited the promotion's first decade. His sole match took place on April 2, 2011, where he defeated González, who had since returned to his masked "Rey Fénix" persona, in the main event. Following this match, Cosme's involvement in the IWA concluded, remaining inactive in Puerto Rico until January 7, 2012, when he reappeared in WWC programming asking for an opportunity to challenge Carly Colón for the Universal Heavyweight Championship. The challenge was accepted and took place at Euphoria 2012, but was inconclusive after Savio Vega distracted Colón, which drained what was left of the pre-established time.

=== Lucha Underground (2014–2018) ===
In September 2014, Cosme began working for Lucha Underground under a mask and the ring name Mil Muertes. In storyline, Muertes' real name was Pasqual Mendoza, whose entire family died in an earthquake in Mexico City when he was seven years old. He debuted on an episode aired on November 6, 2014, accompanied by Catrina as his valet. He was then involved in a major rivalry with Fénix (punctuated by Catrina's turning on him and aligning herself with Fénix), which concluded when Fénix defeated him in a "Grave Consequences" casket match that aired on March 18, 2015. After being "resurrected" by Catrina, Muertes returned, and on April 19, 2015, at Ultima Lucha, Lucha Underground's season one finale, defeated Prince Puma to win the Lucha Underground Championship.

During the season two premiere on January 27, 2016, Muertes retained the Lucha Underground Championship against Ivelisse, despite spearing Catrina. On the April 20 episode of Lucha Underground, Muertes fought Matanza Cueto for the Lucha Underground Championship to a no contest. On the May 5 episode of Lucha Underground, Muertes was defeated by Cueto for the Lucha Underground Championship in a Graver Consequences Casket Match. On July 13 at Ultima Lucha Dos part 2, Muertes defeated King Cuerno in a Death Match. On the August 5 episode of Lucha Underground, Muertes was defeated by Fénix for the Lucha Underground Championship. On the November 16 episode of Lucha Underground, Muertes was lastly eliminated by Sexy Star in Aztec Warfare for the Lucha Underground Championship. On the December 7 episode of Lucha Underground, Muertes was involved in a Battle of the Bulls Tournament Fatal Four Way Match, which was won by The Mack.

On the June 7, 2017 episode of Lucha Underground, Muertes was defeated by Prince Puma in a Street Fight. Muertes then was involved in the Cueto Cup, defeating Veneno, Paul London, and Jeremiah Crane, but was defeated in the semi-final by Pentagón Dark. Catrina's mother Captain Velasquez then tasked her daughter with claiming the Gauntlet of the Gods from Cage. At her behest, Muertes defeated Cage and Crane at Ultima Lucha Tres part 4, in a Triple Threat Elimination Match to win the Gauntlet. After the match, he was attacked by King Cuerno, who stole the Gauntlet.

=== Consejo Mundial de Lucha Libre (2018–2022) ===
On August 22, 2018, Consejo Mundial de Lucha Libre (CMLL) announced that Mesías would be participate in the 2018 International Gran Prix. In CMLL, he was known by the ring name Gilbert El Boricua.

=== Major League Wrestling (2021–2023) ===
In January 2021, Muertes made his debut for Major League Wrestling (MLW), accompanied by Salina de la Renta as his valet. This marked the beginning of a storyline that saw the arrival of several Lucha Underground characters as part of an organization called Azteca Underground, led by a shady businessman known as "El Jefe". Muertes would win his first match by defeating Brian Pillman Jr. At Filthy Island, Muertes defeated Savio Vega in an Aztec Jungle Match, after the latter refused to sell IWA-PR to Azteca Underground. This streak continued with wins over Parrow and Gringo Loco, receiving his first loss after challenging Alexander Hammerstone for the MLW National Openweight Championship.

When "El Jefe" was revealed to be Luis Fernandez-Gil (now known as César Durán, with "Dario Cueto" being explained as one of his many pseudonyms) and De la Renta concluded her run within the promotion, Muertes continued working for Azteca Underground in its quest to "build a new temple". His character's first name was changed from "Mil" to "King" as part of a general repackaging of the Lucha Underground intellectual property. On July 10, 2021, Muertes defeated Richard Holliday in a "Caribbean Rules" match to win the IWA Caribbean Heavyweight Championship (which had been mostly defended in MLW since 2019), as part of Battle Riot III. His first title defense took place at Fightland, where he defeated former MLW World Heavyweight Champion Tom Lawlor in a casket match. This event also featured the debut of Catrina in the promotion, resuming her function as valet.

=== Return to AAA (2024–present) ===
On March 17, 2024, El Mesías returned to AAA after a six-year absence to participate in the Orígenes tour. On April 27 at Triplemanía XXXII: Monterrey, Mesías teamed with Pagano and his old rival Vampiro, defeating La Secta (Cibernético, Dark Ozz, and Dark Cuervo). On November 10, 2024, at Guerra de Titanes, Mesías defeated Octagon Jr., winning the AAA Latin American Championship for the first time in his career and also becoming the Second AAA Triple Crown Champion.

On January 17, 2025 at Alianzas, Mesías retained his title against Octagon Jr. in a rematch.

On March 22, at Rey de Reyes 2025, Mesías won the semi-final round match involving Panic Clown, Mr. Iguana and Pimpinela Escarlata. He was defeated in the final by eventual winner Niño Hamburguesa. This match also involved DMT Azul and El Hijo De Dr. Wagner Jr.

== Championships and accomplishments ==
- International Wrestling Association
  - IWA World Heavyweight Championship (6 times)
  - IWA Intercontinental Championship (3 times)
  - IWA Hardcore Championship (10 times)
  - IWA World Tag Team Championship (6 times) – with Gran Apolo (3), Miguel Perez Jr., Huracan Castillo, Fidel Sierra, Pain (1) as Los Intocables, Glamour Boy Shane (1) and Cruzz (1)
- Ground Zero Wrestling
  - GZW Heavyweight Championship (1 time)
- Kaoz Lucha Libre
  - Kaoz Mixed Tag Team Championship (1 time) – with Christi Jaynes
- Lucha Libre AAA Worldwide
  - AAA Latin American Championship (1 time)
  - AAA Mega Championship (4 times, inaugural)
  - GPCW Super-X Monster Championship (1 time)
  - IWC World Heavyweight Championship (1 time)
  - AAA World Tag Team Championship (1 time) – with Pagano
  - Second Triple Crown Champion
  - Trident Championship (1 time)
  - Copa Antonio Peña (2008)
  - Lucha Libre Premier (2010)
  - Rey de Reyes (2013)
- Lucha Underground
  - Lucha Underground Championship (1 time)
- New Generation Championship Wrestling
  - NGCW World Heavyweight Championship (1 time)
- Major League Wrestling
  - MLW Caribbean Heavyweight Championship (1 time)
- PCW ULTRA
  - PCW Ultra Heavyweight Championship (1 time)
- Planet Lucha
  - Planet Lucha Championship (1 time)
- Promociones EMW
  - EMW World Heavyweight Championship (1 time)
- Pro Wrestling Illustrated
  - PWI ranked him # 26 of the 500 best singles wrestlers in the PWI 500 in 2008 and 2015
- The Crash Lucha Libre
  - Copa Internacional (2020)
- World Wrestling Council
  - WWC Universal Heavyweight Championship (1 time)
  - Copa Luchador de la Década (2010)
- Wrestling Society X
  - WSX Championship (1 time)
- Wrestling Superstar
  - Wrestling Superstar World Submission Lucha Championship (1 time)

=== Luchas de Apuestas record ===
Winner (wager)	Loser (wager)	Location	Event	Date	Notes
La Parka Jr. (mask)	Muerte Cibernetica (mask)	Naucalpan, Mexico State	Triplemanía XIV	June 18, 2006	
L. A. Park (mask)	El Mesías (hair)	Mexico City	Triplemanía XIX	June 18, 2011	
El Mesías (hair)	Electroshock (hair)	Mexico City	Triplemanía XXII	August 17, 2014	(Note: Steel cage match that also involved Averno, Blue Demon Jr., Chessman and La Parka.)

== See also ==
- Professional wrestling in Puerto Rico
