= Héroes Inmortales XI =

2017 Lucha Libre AAA World Wide event

- Official poster for the show
- Promotion: Lucha Libre AAA World Wide
- Date: October 1, 2017
- City: San Luis Potosí, San Luis Potosí, Mexico
- Venue: Domo San Luis
- Attendance: 8,250 (est.) (Note: El Epress estimated that the arena was three-quarters full.)

Event chronology
← Previous; Triplemanía XXV	Next → Lucha Libre World Cup

Héroes Inmortales chronology
← Previous; X	Next → XII

Héroes Inmortales XI (Spanish for "Immortal Heroes Eleven") was a professional wrestling event produced and scripted by the Mexican professional wrestling promotion Lucha Libre AAA World Wide (AAA). The event took place on October 1, 2017 at the Domo San Luis in San Luis Potosí, San Luis Potosí, Mexico. It was the eleventh annual AAA show held in honor of deceased founder Antonio Peña and featured the Copa Antonio Peña tournament named in his honor.

== Production ==
=== Background ===
In 1992 then-Consejo Mundial de Lucha Libre (CMLL) booker and match maker Antonio Peña left the company alongside a number of wrestlers to form the Mexican professional wrestling, company Asistencia Asesoría y Administración, later known simply as "AAA". Over the next decade-and-a-half Peña and the team behind AAA built the promotion into one of the biggest wrestling companies in the world. On October 5, 2006 Peña died from a heart attack. After Peña's death his brother-in-law Jorge Roldan took control of the company with both his wife Marisela Peña, Antonio's sister, and Dorian Roldan (their son) also taking an active part in AAA. On October 7, 2007,AAA held a show in honor of Peña's memory, the first ever "Antonio Peña Memorial Show" (Homenaje an Antonio Peña in Spanish). The following year AAA held the second ever "Antonio Peña Memorial Show", making it an annual tradition for the company to commemorate the passing of their founder. In 2008 the show was rebranded as Héroes Inmortales (Spanish for "Immortal Heroes"), retroactively rebranding the 2007 and 2008 event as Héroes Inmortales I and Héroes Inmortales II.

AAA has held a Héroes Inmortales every year since then, with the 2017 version of the show being Héroes Inmortales XI (11). The Héroes Inmortales hosts the Copa Antonio Peña ("Antonio Peña Cup") tournament each year, a multi-man tournament with various wrestlers from AAA or other promotions competing for a trophy. The tournament format has usually been either a gauntlet match or a multi-man torneo cibernetico elimination match. For the 2017 show the winner of the Copa Antonio Peña would also win the AAA Latin American Championship.

=== Storylines ===
The Héroes Inmortales XI show featured eight professional wrestling matches with different wrestlers involved in pre-existing scripted feuds, plots and storylines. Wrestlers portrayed either heels (referred to as rudos in Mexico, those that portray the "bad guys") or faces (técnicos in Mexico, the "good guy" characters) as they followed a series of tension-building events, which culminated in a wrestling match or series of matches.

== Results ==
No.	Results	Stipulations
1^{D}	Ashley, Pardux and The Tigger defeated Ángel Mortal Jr., Chicano and Hahastary	Six-man tag team match
2	Lanzeloth defeated Johnny Mundo (c), Angelikal, Dragon Solar, El Hijo del Vikingo, Máscara de Bronce, Solaris, Tiger Boy, Venum and Villano III Jr.	Ten-way match for the AAA World Cruiserweight Championship
3	El Nuevo Poder del Norte (Carta Brava Jr., Mocho Cota Jr. and Tito Santana) defeated Aero Star, Drago and Raptor	Six-man tag team match for the vacant AAA World Trios Championship
4	Lady Shani defeated Ayako Hamada by submission	Singles match for the vacant AAA Reina de Reinas Championship
5	El Hijo del Fantasma defeated Johnny Mundo (c), Cuervo, Estrella Divina, Hernandez, Histeria, Mamba, Marty Martinez, Monster Clown, Murder Clown, La Parka, Pimpinela Escarlata, Psicosis, Rey Escorpión and Scoria	2017 Copa Antonio Peña battle royal for the AAA Latin American Championship
6	Aero Star, Drago and Raptor defeated Argenis, Lanzeloth and Ricky Marvin, El Nuevo Poder del Norte (Carta Brava Jr., Mocho Cota Jr. and Tito Santana) and Los OGTs (Averno, Chessman and Súper Fly)	Domo de la Muerte cage match
7	Johnny Mundo (c) (with Shaw Hernández) defeated Rey Wagner	Singles match for the AAA Mega Championship
8	Pagano defeated Joe Líder and El Mesías	Death match
(c) / – the champion(s) heading into the match; D / – this was a dark match
