= Héroes Inmortales XII =

2018 Lucha Libre AAA World Wide event

- Official poster for the 2018 Héroes Inmortales show
- Promotion: Lucha Libre AAA World Wide
- Date: October 28, 2018
- City: Puebla, Puebla, Mexico
- Venue: Gimnasio Miguel Hidalgo
- Attendance: 3,000

Event chronology
← Previous; Triplemanía XXVI	Next → Guerra de Titanes

Héroes Inmortales chronology
← Previous; XI	Next → XIII

Héroes Inmortales XII (Spanish for "Immortal Heroes twelve") was a professional wrestling event produced and scripted by the Mexican professional wrestling promotion Lucha Libre AAA World Wide (AAA). The event took place on October 28, 2018, in Gimnasio Miguel Hidalgo in Puebla, Puebla, Mexico. It was the twelfth annual AAA show held in honor of deceased founder Antonio Peña, and featured the Copa Antonio Peña tournament named in his honor.

The main event was a Lucha de Apuestas or "bet match" where both Jeff Jarrett and Dr. Wagner Jr. bet their hair on the outcome of the match. The show also featured the 2018 Copa Antonio Peña tournament, a match for the AAA World Tag Team Championship, the AAA Reina de Reinas Championship and two additional matches

== Production ==
=== Background ===
In 1992 then-Consejo Mundial de Lucha Libre (CMLL) booker and match maker Antonio Peña left the company alongside a number of wrestlers to form the Mexican professional wrestling, company Asistencia Asesoría y Administración, later known simply as "AAA". Over the next decade-and-a-half Peña and the team behind AAA built the promotion into one of the biggest wrestling companies in the world. On October 5, 2006, Peña died from a heart attack. After Peña's death his brother-in-law Jorge Roldan took control of the company with both his wife Marisela Peña, Antonio's sister, and Dorian Roldan (their son) also taking an active part in AAA. On October 7, 2007,AAA held a show in honor of Peña's memory, the first ever "Antonio Peña Memorial Show" (Homenaje an Antonio Peña in Spanish). The following year AAA held the second ever "Antonio Peña Memorial Show", making it an annual tradition for the company to commemorate the passing of their founder. In 2008 the show was rebranded as Héroes Inmortales (Spanish for "Immortal Heroes"), retroactively rebranding the 2007 and 2008 event as Héroes Inmortales I and Héroes Inmortales II.

AAA has held a Héroes Inmortales every year since then, with the 2018 version of the show being Héroes Inmortales XII (12). The Héroes Inmortales hosts the Copa Antonio Peña ("Antonio Peña Cup") tournament each year, a multi-man tournament with various wrestlers from AAA or other promotions competing for a trophy. The tournament format has usually been either a gauntlet match or a multi-man torneo cibernetico elimination match.

=== Storylines ===
The Héroes Inmortales XII show will feature eight professional wrestling matches with different wrestlers involved in pre-existing scripted feuds, plots and storylines. Wrestlers portrayed either heels (referred to as rudos in Mexico, those that portray the "bad guys") or faces (técnicos in Mexico, the "good guy" characters) as they followed a series of tension-building events, which culminated in a wrestling match or series of matches.

== Results ==
No.	Results	Stipulations	Times
1	Faby Apache (c) defeated Star Fire, Keyra and Scarlett Bordeaux	Four-way match for the AAA Reina de Reinas Championship	7:14
2	El Nuevo Poder del Norte (Carta Brava Jr., Mocho Cota Jr., and Tito Santana) defeated Mamba, Máximo and Pimpinela Escarlata and Aero Star, Drago and Laredo Kid	Triple Threat 9-man tag team match	8:46
3	Los Mercenarios (Rey Escorpión and El Texano Jr.) (c) defeated Andrew Everett and DJZ and MexaBlood (Bandido and Flamita)	Three-way tag team match for the AAA World Tag Team Championship	11:04
4	Pagano won by last eliminating El Hijo del Fantasma (Note: Order of elimination: Chessman, El Hijo del Vikingo, Súper Fly, La Parka Negra, Averno, Niño Hamburguesa, Espectro and Kahos)	2018 Copa Antonio Peña tournament	19:30
5	Murder Clown and Psycho Clown defeated Killer Kross and Monster Clown	Domo de la Muerte Tag team match	11:47
6	Rey Wagner (with Blue Demon Jr.) defeated Jeff Jarrett (with Karen Jarrett)	Lucha de Apuestas, hair vs. hair match	13:37
(c) / – the champion(s) heading into the match
