= Héroes Inmortales XIV =

2021 Lucha Libre AAA World Wide event

- Promotional poster featuring various AAA luchadores and luchadoras
- Promotion: Lucha Libre AAA Worldwide
- Date: October 9, 2021
- City: Orizaba, Mexico
- Venue: Coliseo La Concordia

Event chronology
← Previous; Triplemanía XXIX	Next → Triplemanía Regia II

Héroes Inmortales chronology
← Previous; Héroes Inmortales XIII	Next → 2023

Héroes Inmortales XIV (Spanish for "Immortal Heroes fourteen") was a professional wrestling event produced and scripted by the Mexican professional wrestling promotion Lucha Libre AAA World Wide (AAA). The event took place on October 9, 2021, at Coliseo La Concordia in Orizaba, Mexico. It was the fourteenth Héroes Inmortales show, held annually in honor of the promotion's deceased founder Antonio Peña and features the Copa Antonio Peña tournament named in his honor.

== Production ==
=== Background ===
In 1992 then-Consejo Mundial de Lucha Libre (CMLL) booker and match maker Antonio Peña left the company alongside a number of wrestlers to form the Mexican professional wrestling, company Asistencia Asesoría y Administración, later known simply as "AAA". Over the next decade-and-a-half Peña and the team behind AAA built the promotion into one of the biggest wrestling companies in the world. On October 5, 2006 Peña died from a heart attack. After Peña's death his brother-in-law Jorge Roldan took control of the company with both his wife Marisela Peña, Antonio's sister, and Dorian Roldan (their son) also taking an active part in AAA. On October 7, 2007, AAA held a show in honor of Peña's memory, the first ever "Antonio Peña Memorial Show" (Homenaje an Antonio Peña in Spanish). The following year AAA held the second ever "Antonio Peña Memorial Show", making it an annual tradition for the company to commemorate the passing of their founder. In 2008 the show was rebranded as Héroes Inmortales (Spanish for "Immortal Heroes"), retroactively rebranding the 2007 and 2008 event as Héroes Inmortales I and Héroes Inmortales II.

AAA has held a Héroes Inmortales every year since then, with the 2020 event not occurring due to the COVID-19 pandemic. The Héroes Inmortales hosts the Copa Antonio Peña ("Antonio Peña Cup") tournament each year, a multi-man tournament with various wrestlers from AAA or other promotions competing for a trophy. The tournament format has usually been either a gauntlet match or a multi-man torneo cibernetico elimination match.

=== Storylines ===
The Héroes Inmortales XIV show featured four professional wrestling matches with different wrestlers involved in pre-existing scripted feuds, plots and storylines. Wrestlers portrayed either heels (referred to as rudos in Mexico, those that portray the "bad guys") or faces (técnicos in Mexico, the "good guy" characters) as they followed a series of tension-building events, which culminated in a wrestling match or series of matches.

== Results ==
No.	Results	Stipulations	Times
1	Pimpinela Escarlata defeated Mamba, Aero Star, Sexy Star II, Dave the Clown, Keyra, Villano III Jr., Arez and Argenis	9-person Copa Antonio Peña match	15:12
2	Nueva Generación Dinamita (El Cuatrero, Sansón, and Forastero) defeated El Poder del Norte (Tito Santana, Carta Brava Jr., and Mocho Cota Jr.)	No Disqualification Trios match	12:42
3	Los Lucha Bros (Fénix and Pentagón Jr.) (c) defeated Jinetes del Aire (Hijo del Vikingo and Laredo Kid)	Tag team match for the AAA World Tag Team Championship	16:25
4	La Empresa (Puma King, Sam Adonis, and DMT Azul) defeated Dave the Clown and Los Psycho Circus (Psycho Clown, and Murder Clown)	Steel Cage Trios match	17:11
(c) / – the champion(s) heading into the match
