= Héroes Inmortales (2023) =

2023 Lucha Libre AAA Worldwide event

Héroes Inmortales XV
- Promotion: Lucha Libre AAA Worldwide
- Date: October 1, 2023
- City: Zapopan, Jalisco, Mexico
- Venue: Benitez Juárez Auditorium
- Attendance: 13,000

Event chronology
← Previous; Triplemanía XXXI	Next → Guerra de Titanes

Héroes Inmortales chronology
← Previous; Héroes Inmortales XIV	Next → Héroes Inmortales XVI

Héroes Inmortales XV (Spanish for "Immortal Heroes Fifteen) was a professional wrestling event produced and scripted by the Mexican professional wrestling promotion Lucha Libre AAA Worldwide (AAA). The event took place on October 1, 2023, at Benitez Juárez Auditorium in Zapopan, Jalisco, Mexico. It was the fifteenth Héroes Inmortales show, held annually in honor of the promotion's deceased founder Antonio Peña and it featured the Copa Antonio Peña tournament named in his honor.

== Production ==
=== Background ===
In 1992 then-Consejo Mundial de Lucha Libre (CMLL) booker and match maker Antonio Peña left the company alongside a number of wrestlers to form the Mexican professional wrestling, company Asistencia Asesoría y Administración, later known simply as "AAA". Over the next decade-and-a-half Peña and the team behind AAA built the promotion into one of the biggest wrestling companies in the world. On October 5, 2006, Peña died from a heart attack. After Peña's death his brother-in-law Jorge Roldan took control of the company with both his wife Marisela Peña, Antonio's sister, and Dorian Roldan (their son) also taking an active part in AAA. On October 7, 2007, AAA held a show in honor of Peña's memory, the first ever "Antonio Peña Memorial Show" (Homenaje an Antonio Peña in Spanish). The following year AAA held the second ever "Antonio Peña Memorial Show", making it an annual tradition for the company to commemorate the passing of their founder. In 2008 the show was rebranded as Héroes Inmortales (Spanish for "Immortal Heroes"), retroactively rebranding the 2007 and 2008 event as Héroes Inmortales I and Héroes Inmortales II.

AAA has held a Héroes Inmortales every year since then, with the 2020 event not occurring due to the COVID-19 pandemic. The Héroes Inmortales hosts the Copa Antonio Peña ("Antonio Peña Cup") tournament each year, a multi-man tournament with various wrestlers from AAA or other promotions competing for a trophy. The tournament format has usually been either a gauntlet match or a multi-man torneo cibernetico elimination match.

=== Storylines ===
The Héroes Inmortales XV show featured professional wrestling matches, with different wrestlers involved in pre-existing scripted feuds, plots and storylines. Wrestlers portray either heels (referred to as rudos in Mexico, those that portray the "bad guys") or faces (técnicos in Mexico, the "good guy" characters) as they follow a series of tension-building events, which culminate in a wrestling match or series of matches.

== Results ==
No.	Results	Stipulations	Times
1	Mini Viking, Mr. Iguana and Niño Hamburguesa def. Los Cachanillas (Dinámico, Skalibur and Kamik-C) defeated by pinfall	Trios match	12:05
2	Chik Tormenta and Maravilla won by being the last two competitors (Note: Participants in order of elimination: Reina Dorada, Estrellita, Dulce Canela, Sexy Star II, Faby Apache, and Lady Shani.)	8-woman Copa Antonio Peña eliminator gauntlet match	16:38
3	Flammer and Abismo Negro Jr. (c) defeated Negro Casas and Dalys by disqualification	Mixed tag team match for the AAA World Mixed Tag Team Championship	13:26
4	Nueva Generación Dinamita (Sansón and Forastero) defeated La Parka Negra and Chessman and Los Psycho Circus (Dave the Clown and Murder Clown) by pinfall	Three-way tag team match to determine the #1 contenders to the AAA World Tag Team Championship	14:10
5	Chik Tormenta defeated Dalys, Lolita El Angel and Krista	Fatal four-way elimination match	10:06
6	La Facción Ingobernable (Dralístico and La Bestia del Ring) defeated Jinetes del Aire (Myzteziz Jr. and Hijo del Vikingo) by pinfall	Tag team match	12:12
7	Chik Tormenta defeated Maravilla	Copa Antonio Peña finals	8:02
8	Team USA (QT Marshall and Sam Adonis) (with Harley Cameron) defeated Team Mexico (Octagón Jr. and Alberto El Patrón) (Note: Pentagón Jr. was originally scheduled to team with Octagón Jr., but pulled out due to wrestling at AEW WrestleDream on the same night.) by pinfall	Tag team match	14:56
(c) / – the champion(s) heading into the match

== See also ==
- 2023 in professional wrestling
- List of major Lucha Libre AAA Worldwide events
