= Héroes Inmortales XVI =

2024 Lucha Libre AAA Worldwide event

- Promotional poster of the event
- Promotion: Lucha Libre AAA Worldwide
- Date: October 6, 2024
- City: Zapopan, Jalisco, Mexico
- Venue: Auditorio Benito Juárez

Event chronology
← Previous; Verano de Escándalo	Next → Guerra de Titanes

Héroes Inmortales chronology
← Previous; Héroes Inmortales XV	Next → Héroes Inmortales XVII

Héroes Inmortales XVI (Spanish for "Immortal Heroes Sixteen) was a professional wrestling event produced and scripted by the Mexican professional wrestling promotion Lucha Libre AAA Worldwide (AAA). The event took place on October 6, 2024, at Auditorio Benito Juárez in Zapopan, Jalisco, Mexico. It was the sixteenth Héroes Inmortales show, held annually in honor of the promotion's deceased founder Antonio Peña and it featured the Copa Antonio Peña tournament named in his honor.

== Production ==
=== Background ===
In 1992 then-Consejo Mundial de Lucha Libre (CMLL) booker and match maker Antonio Peña left the company alongside a number of wrestlers to form the Mexican professional wrestling, company Asistencia Asesoría y Administración, later known simply as "AAA". Over the next decade-and-a-half Peña and the team behind AAA built the promotion into one of the biggest wrestling companies in the world. On October 5, 2006, Peña died from a heart attack. After Peña's death his brother-in-law Jorge Roldan took control of the company with both his wife Marisela Peña, Antonio's sister, and Dorian Roldan (their son) also taking an active part in AAA. On October 7, 2007, AAA held a show in honor of Peña's memory, the first ever "Antonio Peña Memorial Show" (Homenaje an Antonio Peña in Spanish). The following year AAA held the second ever "Antonio Peña Memorial Show", making it an annual tradition for the company to commemorate the passing of their founder. In 2008 the show was rebranded as Héroes Inmortales (Spanish for "Immortal Heroes"), retroactively rebranding the 2007 and 2008 event as Héroes Inmortales I and Héroes Inmortales II.

AAA has held a Héroes Inmortales every year since then, with the 2020 event not occurring due to the COVID-19 pandemic. The Héroes Inmortales hosts the Copa Antonio Peña ("Antonio Peña Cup") tournament each year, a multi-man tournament with various wrestlers from AAA or other promotions competing for a trophy. The tournament format has usually been either a gauntlet match or a multi-man torneo cibernetico elimination match.

=== Storylines ===
The Héroes Inmortales XV show featured professional wrestling matches, with different wrestlers involved in pre-existing scripted feuds, plots and storylines. Wrestlers portray either heels (referred to as rudos in Mexico, those that portray the "bad guys") or faces (técnicos in Mexico, the "good guy" characters) as they follow a series of tension-building events, which culminate in a wrestling match or series of matches.

== Results ==
No.	Results	Stipulations	Times
1	Chik Tormenta won by last eliminating Mini Vikingo (Note: Other participants were Belcegor, Brazo de Oro Jr., Dalys, Lady Maravilla, Panic Clown, and Pierroth Jr.)	Copa Antonio Peña match	26:04
2	Decay (Crazzy Steve and Havok) defeated Abismo Negro Jr. and Flammer (c) by pinfall	Mixed tag team match for the AAA World Mixed Tag Team Championship	10:18
3	Tokyo Bad Boys (Nobu San, SB Kento and Takuma) defeated Niño Hamburguesa, Epydemius Jr. and Dinámico by pinfall	Six-man tag team match	12:05
4	Matt Riddle (c) defeated El Fiscal by pinfall	Singles match for the AAA World Cruiserweight Championship	14:32
5	Vampiro, Mecha Wolf and Negro Casas defeated El Mesías and Nueva Generación Dinamita (Sansón and Forastero) by pinfall	Six-man tag team match	13:12
6	Alberto El Patrón (c) (with Konnan) defeated Laredo Kid (with Latin Lover) by pinfall	Singles match for the AAA Mega Championship	16:05
(c) / – the champion(s) heading into the match

== See also ==
- 2024 in professional wrestling
- List of major Lucha Libre AAA Worldwide events
