= Rey de Reyes (2026) =

AAA professional wrestling event

- Promotional poster featuring various AAA and WWE wrestlers
- Promotion(s): Lucha Libre AAA Worldwide; WWE (Note: WWE handled the production of this event.)
- Date: March 14, 2026 (Aired March 14–28, 2026)
- City: Puebla de Zaragoza, Puebla, Mexico
- Venue: Auditorio GNP Seguros

Event chronology
← Previous; Guerra de Titanes	Next → Noche de Los Grandes

Rey de Reyes chronology
← Previous; 2025	Next → —

The 2026 Rey de Reyes (Spanish for "King of Kings") was a professional wrestling event produced by the Mexican professional wrestling promotion Lucha Libre AAA Worldwide (AAA), in partnership with its parent company WWE. The event took place on March 14, 2026 at Auditorio GNP Seguros in Puebla de Zaragoza, Puebla, Mexico, and aired as a three-week event, every Saturday on episodes of Lucha Libre AAA from March 14 to March 28, 2026. It was the 29th Rey de Reyes show promoted by AAA since 1997, and the first Rey de Reyes held under WWE's ownership of AAA.

It featured the final of the 2026 Rey de Reyes tournament, won by El Grande Americano. For his victory, El Grande Americano earned a future AAA Mega Championship match. In other prominent matches, Flammer defeated Bayley to retain the AAA Reina de Reinas Championship in an open challenge and Laredo Kid retained the AAA World Cruiserweight Championship in a four-way match. Also, Dominik Mysterio retained the AAA Mega Championship against El Hijo del Vikingo in a Lucha de Apuestas No Disqualification match, where Vikingo can no longer challenge Mysterio for the AAA Mega Championship after this loss.

== Production ==
=== Background ===
Since 1997 and every year except 2020, the Mexican Lucha Libre, or professional wrestling, company AAA has held a Rey de Reyes (Spanish for "King of Kings") show in the spring. The 1997 version was held in February, while all subsequent Rey de Reyes shows were held in March. As part of their annual Rey de Reyes event AAA holds the eponymous Rey de Reyes tournament to determine that specific year's Rey. Most years the show hosts both the qualifying round and the final match, but on occasion the qualifying matches have been held prior to the event as part of AAA's weekly television shows. The traditional format consists of four preliminary rounds, each a Four-man elimination match with each of the four winners face off in the tournament finals, again under elimination rules. There have been years where AAA has employed a different format to determine a winner. The winner of the Rey de Reyes tournament is given a large ornamental sword to symbolize their victory, but is normally not guaranteed any other rewards for winning the tournament, although some years becoming the Rey de Reyes has earned the winner a match for the AAA Mega Championship. From 1999 through 2009 AAA also held an annual Reina de Reinas ("Queen of Queens") tournament, but later turned that into an actual championship that could be defended at any point during the year, abandoning the annual tournament concept.

During Guerra de Titanes on December 20, 2025, AAA announced that Rey de Reyes would take place on March 14, 2026, in Puebla de Zaragoza, Puebla at the Auditorio GNP Seguros. On the March 7, 2026 episode of Lucha Libre AAA, AAA announced that Rey de Reyes would air as three-week event on the weekly Saturday Lucha Libre AAA TV show from March 14 to March 28.

=== Storylines ===
Rey de Reyes is featuring professional wrestling matches that involve wrestlers from scripted feuds. The wrestlers portray either heels (referred to as rudos in Mexico, those that play the part of the "bad guys") or faces (técnicos in Mexico, the "good guy" characters) as they performed.

On the January 24 episode of Lucha Libre AAA, Penta announced the format of the 2026 Rey de Reyes tournament. It would consist of four fatal four-way qualifying matches. The winners of those matches would compete in a fatal four-way tournament final for an opportunity to challenge for the AAA Mega Championship. Penta will present the signature sword to the winner of the tournament. The tournament began on the January 31 episode where La Parka defeated Jack Cartwheel, Aero Star, and Apollo Crews. On the following episode, "The Original" El Grande Americano attacked El Grande Americano backstage and handcuffed him to take his spot in that night's qualifying match. He went on to defeat Octagón Jr., Dragon Lee, and Rey Fénix. On the February 28 episode, El Grande Americano accused "The Original" El Grande Americano of being a fake, citing the use of AI to appear to be able to speak Spanish. Pimpinela Escarlata confronted "The Original" El Grande Americano about El Grande Americano's claim, leading to Escarlata getting assaulted and unable to participate in that night's qualifier. Escarlata asked El Grande Americano to replace him, which he accepted. He went on to defeat Ethan Page, Omos, and El Hijo de Dr. Wagner Jr. to earn the third spot in the Rey de Reyes tournament final. On the March 7 episode, Santos Escobar defeated Abismo Negro Jr., Mr. Iguana, and Psycho Clown to earn the final spot in the Rey de Reyes tournament final.

On the February 14 episode of Lucha Libre AAA, War Raiders (Erik and Ivar) defeated Los Americanos (Rayo Americano and Bravo Americano) and Money Machine (Garra de Oro and Colmillo de Plata) in a three-way tag team match to earn a shot at the AAA World Tag Team Championship. A match for the title between defending champions Pagano and Psycho Clown and the War Raiders at Rey de Reyes was made official on the February 21 episode.

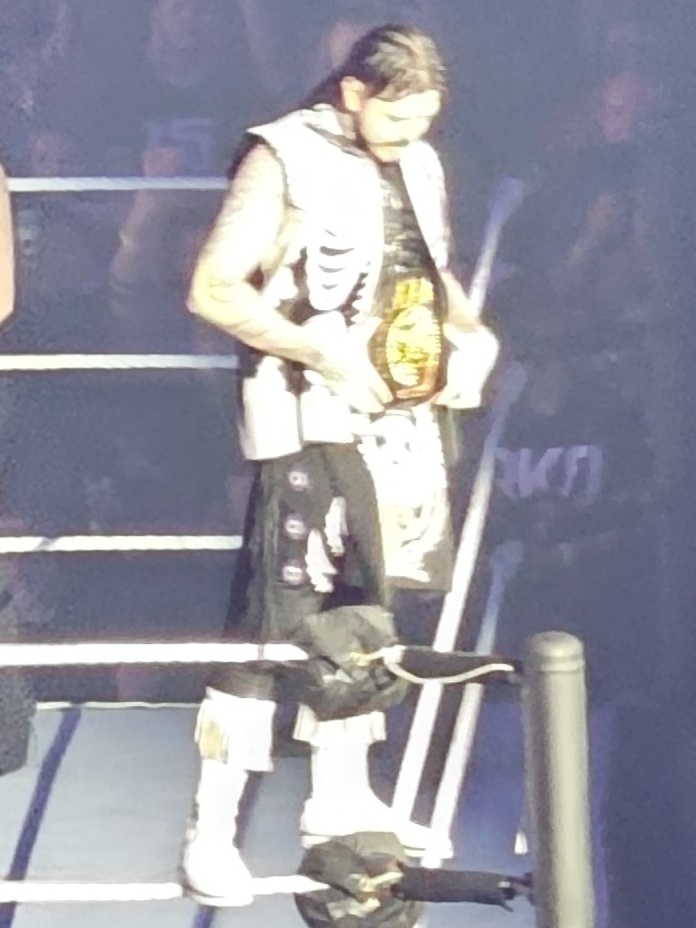
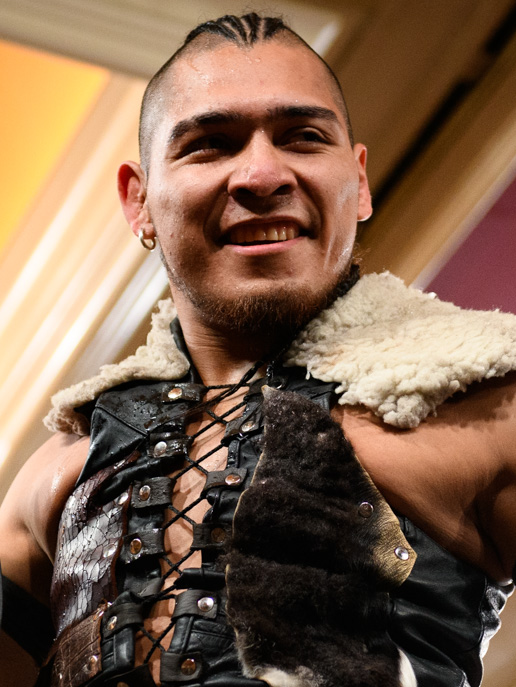
Dominik Mysterio defended the AAA Mega Championship against El Hijo del Vikingo where if Dominik won, Vikingo couldn't challenge Mysterio for the title anymore, but if Vikingo won, Dominik had to leave AAA.

At Worlds Collide on September 12, 2025, Dominik Mysterio won the AAA Mega Championship by dethroning El Hijo del Vikingo. Vikingo attempted to earn another shot at the title by competing in a triple threat match against Dragon Lee and El Grande Americano on AAA Alianzas on September 27, but he failed to win the match as Lee came out victorious. At Héroes Inmortales XVII on October 20, Vikingo and Americano had a confrontation that led to a brawl. Later that night, Mysterio defeated Lee to retain the title. After the match, Vikingo and Lee attacked Mysterio, but their attack stopped when Americano came out to help Mysterio. After Vikingo and Lee left the ring, Mysterio set up a tag team match between the two pairs. On AAA Alianzas on November 22, Mysterio and Americano defeated Vikingo and Lee. On the January 31, 2026, episode of Lucha Libre AAA, Vikingo defeated Americano and became the next challenger for the AAA Mega Championship. Mysterio revealed that he will defend his title against Vikingo in the main event of Rey de Reyes. On the February 7 episode, Vikingo proposed to have Mysterio's hair to also be on the line in their upcoming title match. He stated he will seek his answer in their contract signing two weeks later. At their contract signing on the February 21 episode, Mysterio stated that if Vikingo loses, he can never challenge Mysterio for the title. Vikingo added on to the stipulations by disregarding his previous proposal and stated that their match will be a No Disqualification match and if Mysterio loses, he must leave AAA forever.

== Events ==
Other on-screen personnel
Role	Name
Commentators	José Manuel Guillén
Commentators	Roberto Figueroa
English commentators	Corey Graves
English commentators	John "Bradshaw" Layfield
English commentators	Rey Mysterio
Ring announcer	Jesús Zuñiga
Referees	Suavecito
Referees	Eddie Orengo

=== Week 1 ===
==== Preliminary matches ====
The first match was Flammer's open challenge for the AAA Reina de Reinas Championship, which was answered by WWE's Bayley. As Bayley had control of the match, Lady Maravilla arrived at ringside, but Bayley neutralized her. La Hiedra then blindsided Bayley, which allowed Flammer to throw Bayley into the exposed turnbuckle. She then kicked her with her feet before pinning her to retain the title.

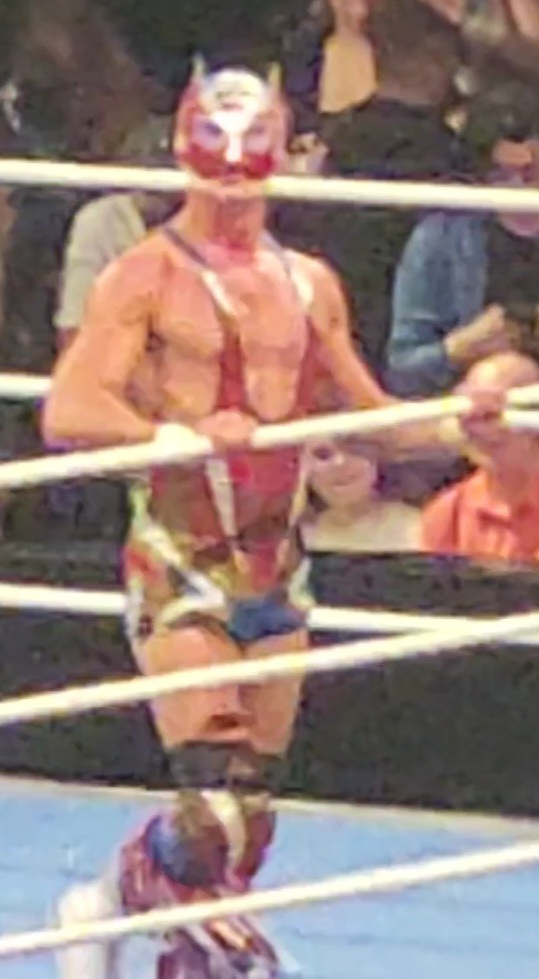
El Grande Americano won the 2026 Rey de Reyes tournament.

The next match was the four-way Rey de Reyes tournament final featuring "The Original" El Grande Americano, El Grande Americano, La Parka, and Santos Escobar, where there were no disqualifications and countouts with the first competitor to get a pinfall or submission would win the match. "Original" Americano and Grande Americano placed a weapon in their masks before their heads collide. Then, Parka and Escobar hit each other with a clothesline, in which they both ran into each other. "Original" Americano and Grande Americano began fighting in the crowd, while Parka and Escobar fought each other in the ring. Escobar slammed Parka face-first into a steel chair. After Grande Americano returned to the ring, it was revealed that Rayo Americano and Bravo Americano were beating up "Original" Americano and handcuffed him to the railing. As Escobar tried to get a chair, a masked man appeared and hit Escobar with the chair. Grande Americano then hit him with a flying headbutt to score the pinfall and win the 2026 Rey de Reyes tournament.

==== Main event ====
In the main event, Dominik Mysterio defended the AAA Mega Championship against El Hijo del Vikingo (accompanied by Dorian Roldán) in a No Disqualification Lucha de Apuestas match, where there was no disqualification. If Mysterio lost, he would have to leave AAA, while if Vikingo lost, he could no longer challenge Mysterio for the title. After Mysterio executed a "Michinoku Driver", he attempted a pinfall but Roldán saved Vikingo. Omos, Vikingo and Roldán's El Ojo stablemate, appeared and threw a garbage can at Mysterio. Vikingo then hit a double stomp off the top rope for a near-fall. Vikingo wore the belt, but he missed the dive. As Mysterio prepared to attack, Omos chokeslammed him, lfiting him up by the neck before slamming him down. Omos then helped Vikingo prepare for a dive, but Mini Vikingo appeared and attacked Vikingo. Omos then choked Mini Vikingo until Mysterio struck Omos' groin and hit his back with a steel chair. Mysterio then hit Vikingo with a chairshot before connecting with the "619", in which Mysterio jumping through the ropes while holding onto them to swing back into the ring and kicking Vikingo's head in the process. Mysterio then executed a frog splash, in which Mysterio dove off the top rope while moving his arms and legs inwards and outwards before landing on a supine Vikingo, to defeat Vikingo via pinfall and retain the title.

=== Week 2 ===
==== Preliminary match ====
Week 2 opened with the six-person tag team match between the team of Lola Vice, Mr. Iguana, and Rey Fénix and the team of La Hiedra and Money Machine (Colmillo de Plata and Garra de Oro). Fénix twisted as he dove towards Plata, and then Iguana executed Bulldog on Oro, grabbing Oro's head before jumping forward to drive his head into the mat. Iguana then tried to pin Oro, but Hiedra pulled Iguana out of the ring. Fénix later powerbombed Oro to get the pinfall victory for his team.

==== Main event ====
The final match of Week 2 was Pagano and Psycho Clown defending the AAA World Tag Team Championship against the War Raiders (Erik and Ivar). After Pagano dropped his leg onto Ivar, but Erik saved Ivar in the ensuing pinfall. Clown was accidentally struck by Pagano's elbow, which made him furious at Pagano as he began shoving his partner. The War Raiders then began the brawl, which led to the referee getting accidentally knocked down. The referee called for the bell to end the match in a no contest. After the match, the wrestlers continued to attack each other with chairs and kendo sticks.

The broadcast capped off with the award ceremony to present the ceremonial Rey de Reyes sword to the 2026 Rey de Reyes winner El Grande Americano. Chessman, Texano Jr., and Cibernético came out to join the ceremony before Grande Americano made his entrance. Grande Americano thanked the fans and his family. AAA Mega Champion Dominik Mysterio made an appearance. As he and Grande Americano argued, "The Original" El Grande Americano ambushed Grande Americano which started a brawl. "Original" Americano then stood on the announce table with the Rey de Reyes sword.

=== Week 3 ===
==== Preliminary match ====
Next, Laredo Kid defended the AAA World Cruiserweight Championship against Dragon Lee, Jack Cartwheel, and TJP in a fatal four-way match, where there were no disqualifications and countouts and the aim was to win via pinfall or submission. Lee hit Cartwheel with the "Styles Clash" onto TJP, in which Lee positioned Cartwheel upside down before falling forward to force Cartwheel to fall face-first. He then attempted a pinfall, but Kid broke it up; the near-fall was controversial due to the referee being late to make the third count. Lee and Kid kicked TJP's chin to send him to the outside. Lee then swung his back elbow to Cartwheel before diving onto him on the outside. TJP then grabbed the title, but he missed his attack. Kid later stomped on TJP's head to get the pinfall victory and retain the title.

==== Main event ====
The final match of the event was between Abismo Negro Jr. and El Fiscal. They brawled before the opening bell when Fiscal charged at Negro Jr. The match officially began when they entered the ring. Fiscal later spun and kicked at Negro Jr. in the corner before pinning him with a roll-up, backward rolling Negro Jr. to sit on top of him with his shoulders down. Fiscal defeated Negro Jr. via pinfall.

El Ojo (El Hijo del Vikingo, Omos, and Dorian Roldán) arrived to the ring. Roldán claimed that AAA and the fans betrayed Vikingo. Vikingo then spoke about his frustration regarding Mini Vikingo's interference in his match at Week 1 of Rey de Reyes. WWE Intercontinental Champion Penta arrived to have an argument with Vikingo. They then agreed to a match on the April 11, 2026, episode of Lucha Libre AAA in Mexico City, Mexico.

== Reception ==
The event received generally positive reviews from critics. Dave Meltzer of the Wrestling Observer Newsletter reviewed the event's first three matches that aired live. The Rey de Reyes tournament final received 4.25 out of 5 stars. The AAA Mega Championship match received 3 stars, while the AAA Reina de Reinas Championship match received 2.5 stars.

Ricardo Rendón of Super Luchas gave high praise to the majority of the card but was critical of the decision to broadcast the event in three weekly installments rather than as a single Premium Live Event (PLE). Rendón labeled the Rey de Reyes tournament final "the best fight of the new stage of AAA's weekly shows with WWE," noting that the victory consolidated El Grande Americano as the primary face of the modern AAA era. Additionally, he remarked that the chaotic nature of the AAA Mega Championship match was reminiscent of the "extreme fighting" style that had defined the promotion's historical identity.

Steve Cook of 411Mania gave the event an average score of 7.7 out of 10, describing the first part of the event as the best episode of Lucha Libre AAA in 2026. The highest rated matches were the Rey de Reyes Tournament final and the AAA World Cruiserweight Championship four-way match with a 3.75 out of 5. He highlighted that Jack Cartwheel is a future star and that Dragon Lee has accomplished more than he originally expected when he signed with WWE. The AAA Reina de Reinas Championship match received 3.25 stars, noting that Bayley was the right person to put Flammer over. The AAA Mega Championship match received 3 stars, criticizing its time being cut. The Relevos Australianos match received 2.75 stars, while the lowest-rated matches with 2/5 stars are the AAA World Tag Team Championship match and the El Fiscal versus Abismo Negro Jr. match.

Thomas Hall of 411Mania reviewed the event with an average rating of 8.5 out of 10, noting that AAA "continues to be among the best weekly series" and is an "easy show to watch". The Rey de Reyes Tournament final and the AAA World Cruiserweight Championship match received a B+, the highest rating of the event. The AAA Mega Championship match and the AAA World Tag Team Championship match received a B. Hall noted that Dominik Mysterio and El Hijo del Vikingo did not overstay their welcome and that the tag team title match did not overthink things as a match about "two big power teams beating the daylights out of each other". The rest of the match card received a B−. Hall stated that Flammer cheating to beat Bayley was a "great way to use a star". Also, he compared Abimso Negro versus El Fiscal to Jake Roberts versus Randy Savage at This Tuesday in Texas because it did not have enough time fitting for their bitter feud.

== Results ==
Week 1 (March 14)
No.	Results	Stipulations	Times
1	Flammer (c) defeated Bayley by pinfall	Open Challenge for the AAA Reina de Reinas Championship	11:50
2	El Grande Americano defeated La Parka, "The Original" El Grande Americano, and Santos Escobar by pinfall	Four-way Rey de Reyes tournament final match to determine the #1 contender for the AAA Mega Championship	19:18
3	Dominik Mysterio (c) defeated El Hijo del Vikingo (with Dorian Roldán) by pinfall	No Disqualification Lucha de Apuestas match for the AAA Mega Championship; Since Mysterio won, Vikingo could not challenge for the title as long as Mysterio is champion. Had Vikingo won, Mysterio would have had to leave AAA.	11:54
(c) / – the champion(s) heading into the match

Week 2 (March 21)
No.	Results	Stipulations	Times
1	Lola Vice, Mr. Iguana, and Rey Fénix defeated La Hiedra and Money Machine (Garra de Oro and Colmillo de Plata) by pinfall	Six-person tag team match	9:39
2	Pagano and Psycho Clown (c) vs. The War Raiders (Erik and Ivar) ended in a no contest	Tag team match for the AAA World Tag Team Championship	13:28
(c) / – the champion(s) heading into the match

Week 3 (March 28)
No.	Results	Stipulations	Times
1	Laredo Kid (c) defeated Dragon Lee, Jack Cartwheel, and TJP by pinfall	Four-way match for the AAA World Cruiserweight Championship	13:18
2	El Fiscal defeated Abismo Negro Jr. by pinfall	Singles match	6:45
(c) / – the champion(s) heading into the match

=== Rey de Reyes tournament (2026) ===
Qualifiers; Lucha Libre AAA; January 17 – February 28, 2026 (Aired: January 31 – March 7)
La Parka	Pinfall
Aero Star	8:13
Jack Cartwheel	—
Apollo Crews	—
"The Original" El Grande Americano	Pinfall
Rey Fénix	—
Dragon Lee	—
Octagón Jr.	14:22
El Hijo de Dr. Wagner Jr.	—
Omos	—
El Grande Americano (Note: Pimpinela Escarlata was originally slated to participate in the tournament on the February 28, 2026, episode of Lucha Libre AAA. Earlier that night, "The Original" El Grande Americano assaulted Escarlata after he confronted and accused Americano of being a fake. He was later confirmed not medically cleared and unable to participate in the tournament. As requested by Escarlata, El Grande Americano was his replacement.)	Pinfall
Ethan Page	18:07
Santos Escobar	Pinfall
Mr. Iguana	9:55
Psycho Clown	—
Abismo Negro Jr.	—

Final; Rey de Reyes; March 14, 2026
La Parka	—
"The Original" El Grande Americano	—
El Grande Americano	Pinfall
Santos Escobar	19:18

== See also ==
- List of major Lucha Libre AAA Worldwide events
