= Héroes Inmortales XIII =

2019 Lucha Libre AAA World Wide event

- Poster
- Promotion: Lucha Libre AAA World Wide
- Date: October 19, 2019
- City: Orizaba, Veracruz, Mexico
- Venue: Coliseo "La Concordia"

Event chronology
| ← Previous; Lucha Invades NY | Next → Triplemanía Regia |

Héroes Inmortales chronology
| ← Previous; XII | Next → XIV |

Héroes Inmortales XIII (Spanish for "Immortal Heroes thirteen") was a professional wrestling event produced and scripted by the Mexican professional wrestling promotion Lucha Libre AAA World Wide (AAA). The event took place on October 19, 2019, in Coliseo "La Concordia" in Orizaba, Veracruz, Mexico. It was the thirteenth annual AAA show held in honor of deceased founder Antonio Peña, and featured the Copa Antonio Peña tournament named in his honor.

== Production ==
=== Background ===
In 1992 then-Consejo Mundial de Lucha Libre (CMLL) booker and match maker Antonio Peña left the company alongside a number of wrestlers to form the Mexican professional wrestling, company Asistencia Asesoría y Administración, later known simply as "AAA". Over the next decade-and-a-half Peña and the team behind AAA built the promotion into one of the biggest wrestling companies in the world. On October 5, 2006 Peña died from a heart attack. After Peña's death his brother-in-law Jorge Roldan took control of the company with both his wife Marisela Peña, Antonio's sister, and Dorian Roldan (their son) also taking an active part in AAA. On October 7, 2007,AAA held a show in honor of Peña's memory, the first ever "Antonio Peña Memorial Show" (Homenaje an Antonio Peña in Spanish). The following year AAA held the second ever "Antonio Peña Memorial Show", making it an annual tradition for the company to commemorate the passing of their founder. In 2008 the show was rebranded as Héroes Inmortales (Spanish for "Immortal Heroes"), retroactively rebranding the 2007 and 2008 event as Héroes Inmortales I and Héroes Inmortales II.

AAA has held a Héroes Inmortales every year since then, with the 2019 version of the show being Héroes Inmortales XII (13). The Héroes Inmortales hosts the Copa Antonio Peña ("Antonio Peña Cup") tournament each year, a multi-man tournament with various wrestlers from AAA or other promotions competing for a trophy. The tournament format has usually been either a gauntlet match or a multi-man torneo cibernetico elimination match.

=== Storylines ===
The Héroes Inmortales XIII show will feature an undetermined number of professional wrestling matches with different wrestlers involved in pre-existing scripted feuds, plots and storylines. Wrestlers portrayed either heels (referred to as rudos in Mexico, those that portray the "bad guys") or faces (técnicos in Mexico, the "good guy" characters) as they followed a series of tension-building events, which culminated in a wrestling match or series of matches.

== Results ==
| No. | Results | Stipulations | Times |
|---|---|---|---|
| 1 | Draztic Boy, Lady Shani, Octagoncito and Pimpinela Escarlata defeated Australian Suicide, Demus, Mamba and Vanilla (with Michael Nakazawa) | Relevos Atómicos de Locura match | 10:24 |
| 2 | Villano III Jr. and Lady Maravilla (c) defeated Niño Hamburguesa and Big Mami and Keyra and Látigo | Three-way tag team match for the AAA World Mixed Tag Team Championship | 09:36 |
| 3 | Daga defeated Drago (c) | Singles match for the AAA Latin American Championship | 14:26 |
| 4 | Dinastía, Octagón Jr. and Puma King defeated Abismo Negro Jr., Arez and Super Fly. | Six-man tag team Lumberjack strap match | 09:45 |
| 5 | El Hijo del Vikingo won by last eliminating Taurus; Also in the match: Aerostar, Murder Clown, Iron Kid, Dave The Clown, Monster Clown, Trittón, La Hiedra, Faby Apache, La Parka Negra | 2019 Copa Antonio Peña tournament | 22:01 |
| 6 | Kenny Omega defeated Fénix (c) | Singles match for the AAA Mega Championship | 19:38 |
| 7 | Pentagón Jr. won the match that also included his tag team partner Texano Jr. as well as the teams of Psycho Clown/Rey Escorpión, Averno/Dr. Wagner Jr. vs. Chessman/Pagano. | Four team Relevos Increíbles steel cage match | 19:11 |
(c) / – the champion(s) heading into the match
