= Héroes Inmortales XVII =

2025 Lucha Libre AAA Worldwide event

- Promotional poster featuring Dominik Mysterio and Dragon Lee
- Promotion(s): Lucha Libre AAA Worldwide; WWE (Note: WWE handled the production of this event.)
- Date: October 25, 2025
- City: Mexico City, Mexico
- Venue: Gimnasio Olímpico Juan de la Barrera

Event chronology
← Previous; Worlds Collide: Las Vegas	Next → Guerra de Titanes

Héroes Inmortales chronology
← Previous; XVI	Next → 2026

Héroes Inmortales XVII (Spanish for "Immortal Heroes" Seventeen) was a professional wrestling event promoted by the Mexican professional wrestling promotion Lucha Libre AAA Worldwide (AAA), a subsidiary of WWE. The event took place on October 25, 2025, at the Gimnasio Olímpico Juan de la Barrera in Mexico City, Mexico. It was the seventeenth Héroes Inmortales show, held annually in honor of the promotion's deceased founder Antonio Peña, and was the first Héroes Inmortales to be held under WWE's ownership of AAA. Additionally, wrestlers from WWE's Raw, NXT, and Evolve brand divisions also appeared.

In the main event, Dominik Mysterio defeated Dragon Lee to retain the AAA Mega Championship; in other prominent matches, Laredo Kid defeated Lince Dorado, Aerostar, and Jack Cartwheel in a fatal four-way match to retain the AAA World Cruiserweight Championship, Pagano and Psycho Clown defeated Nueva Generación Dinamita (Sansón and Forastero) in a tag team open challenge to retain the AAA World Tag Team Championship, and Flammer defeated Faby Apache and Natalya in a triple threat match to retain the AAA Reina de Reinas Championship. The event was also notable for being the first event in the Héroes Inmortales series not to feature the Copa Antonio Peña.

== Production ==
=== Background ===
In 1992 then-Consejo Mundial de Lucha Libre (CMLL) booker and matchmaker Antonio Peña left the company alongside a number of wrestlers to form the new Mexican professional wrestling company Asistencia Asesoría y Administración, later known simply as "AAA". Over the next decade-and-a-half Peña and the team behind AAA built the promotion into one of the biggest wrestling companies in the world. On October 5, 2006, Peña died from a heart attack. After Peña's death his brother-in-law Jorge Roldan took control of the company with both his wife Marisela Peña, Antonio's sister, and Dorian Roldan (their son) also taking an active part in AAA. On October 7, 2007, AAA held a show in honor of Peña's memory, the first ever Antonio Peña Memorial Show (Homenaje a Antonio Peña in Spanish). The following year AAA held their second Antonio Peña Memorial Show, making it an annual tradition for the company to commemorate the passing of their founder. In 2009 the show was rebranded as Héroes Inmortales (Spanish for "Immortal Heroes"), retroactively rebranding the 2007 and 2008 event as Héroes Inmortales I and Héroes Inmortales II.

AAA has held a Héroes Inmortales every year since then, with the 2020 event not occurring due to the COVID-19 pandemic. The Héroes Inmortales typically hosts the Copa Antonio Peña ("Antonio Peña Cup") tournament each year, a multi-man tournament with various wrestlers from AAA or other promotions competing for a trophy. The tournament format has usually been either a gauntlet match or a multi-man torneo cibernetico elimination match. The 2025 edition of Héroes Inmortales marked the first time the event did not host the Copa Antonio Peña.

=== Storylines ===
The Héroes Inmortales XVII show featured professional wrestling matches, with different wrestlers involved in pre-existing scripted feuds, plots and storylines. Wrestlers portrayed either heels (referred to as rudos in Mexico, those that portray the "bad guys") or faces (técnicos in Mexico, the "good guy" characters) as they follow a series of tension-building events, which culminate in a wrestling match or series of matches.

At AAA Alianzas on September 27, 2025, Dragon Lee defeated El Grande Americano and El Hijo del Vikingo in a triple threat match to become the number one contender to the AAA Mega Championship. AAA would later announce that the match for the Mega Championship between reigning champion Dominik Mysterio and number one contender Lee would take place at Héroes Inmortales on October 25, 2025.

== Results ==
No.	Results	Stipulations	Times
1^{D}	Niño Hamburguesa, Pimpinela Escarlata, and Lady Shani defeated Dalys and Los Vipers (Taurus and Abismo Negro Jr.) by pinfall	Relevos De Locura match This was the Antonio Peña tribute match.	8:38
2^{D}	Mascarita Sagrada defeated Mini Abismo Negro by pinfall	Singles match	7:35
3^{D}	Galeno del Mal defeated El Fiscal by pinfall	Singles match	5:27
4^{D}	Laredo Kid (c) defeated Lince Dorado, Aerostar, and Jack Cartwheel by pinfall	Fatal four-way match for the AAA World Cruiserweight Championship	10:18
5^{D}	Flammer (c) defeated Faby Apache and Natalya by pinfall	Triple threat match for the AAA Reina de Reinas Championship	10:22
6	Lola Vice defeated Chik Tormenta by pinfall	Singles match	5:52
7	Pagano and Psycho Clown (c) defeated Nueva Generación Dinamita (Sansón and Forastero) by pinfall	Tag team match for the AAA World Tag Team Championship; This was an open challenge.	10:52
8	Dominik Mysterio (c) defeated Dragon Lee by pinfall	Singles match for the AAA Mega Championship	17:41
(c) / – the champion(s) heading into the match; D / – this was a dark match

== See also ==
- List of major Lucha Libre AAA Worldwide events
