= Héroes Inmortales (2026) =

AAA professional wrestling event

- Promotional poster featuring Dominik Mysterio, Rey Mysterio, and El Grande Americano
- Promotion(s): Lucha Libre AAA Worldwide; WWE (Note: WWE handled the production of this event.)
- Date: October 24, 2026 (aired October 24 – November 7)
- City: Mexico City, Mexico
- Venue: Gimnasio Olímpico Juan de la Barrera

Event chronology
← Previous; Worlds Collide: Chicago	Next → Worlds Collide: Doomsday

Héroes Inmortales chronology
← Previous; Héroes Inmortales XVII	Next → —

The 2026 Héroes Inmortales, sequentially known as Héroes Inmortales XVIII (Spanish for "Immortal Heroes" Eighteen), was a professional wrestling livestreaming and television special event promoted by the Mexican professional wrestling promotion Lucha Libre AAA Worldwide (AAA), in partnership with its parent company WWE. The event took place on Saturday, October 24, 2026, at Gimnasio Olímpico Juan de la Barrera in Mexico City, Mexico, and aired as a three-week event, every Saturday on episodes of Lucha Libre AAA from October 24 to November 7. It was the 18th annual Héroes Inmortales event in honor of AAA's deceased founder Antonio Peña.

The card comprised a total of eight matches, split across three weeks. In the main event of Week 1, El Grande Americano defeated Dominik Mysterio to retain the AAA Mega Championship. In other prominent matches, Los Perros del Mal (Daga, Angel, and Berto) defeated La Parka, Mr. Iguana, and Niño Hamburguesa to retain the AAA World Trios Championship, La Catalina defeated Flammer and La Hiedra in a triple threat match to retain the AAA Reina de Reinas Championship, and Rey Fénix defeated Jack Cartwheel, Laredo Kid, and Takuma in a fatal four-way match to retain the AAA World Cruiserweight Championship. The event also featured AAA President Marisela Peña's induction into the AAA Hall of Fame and the announcement of the indefinite suspension of Rey Mysterio as the general manager of AAA.

== Production ==
=== Background ===
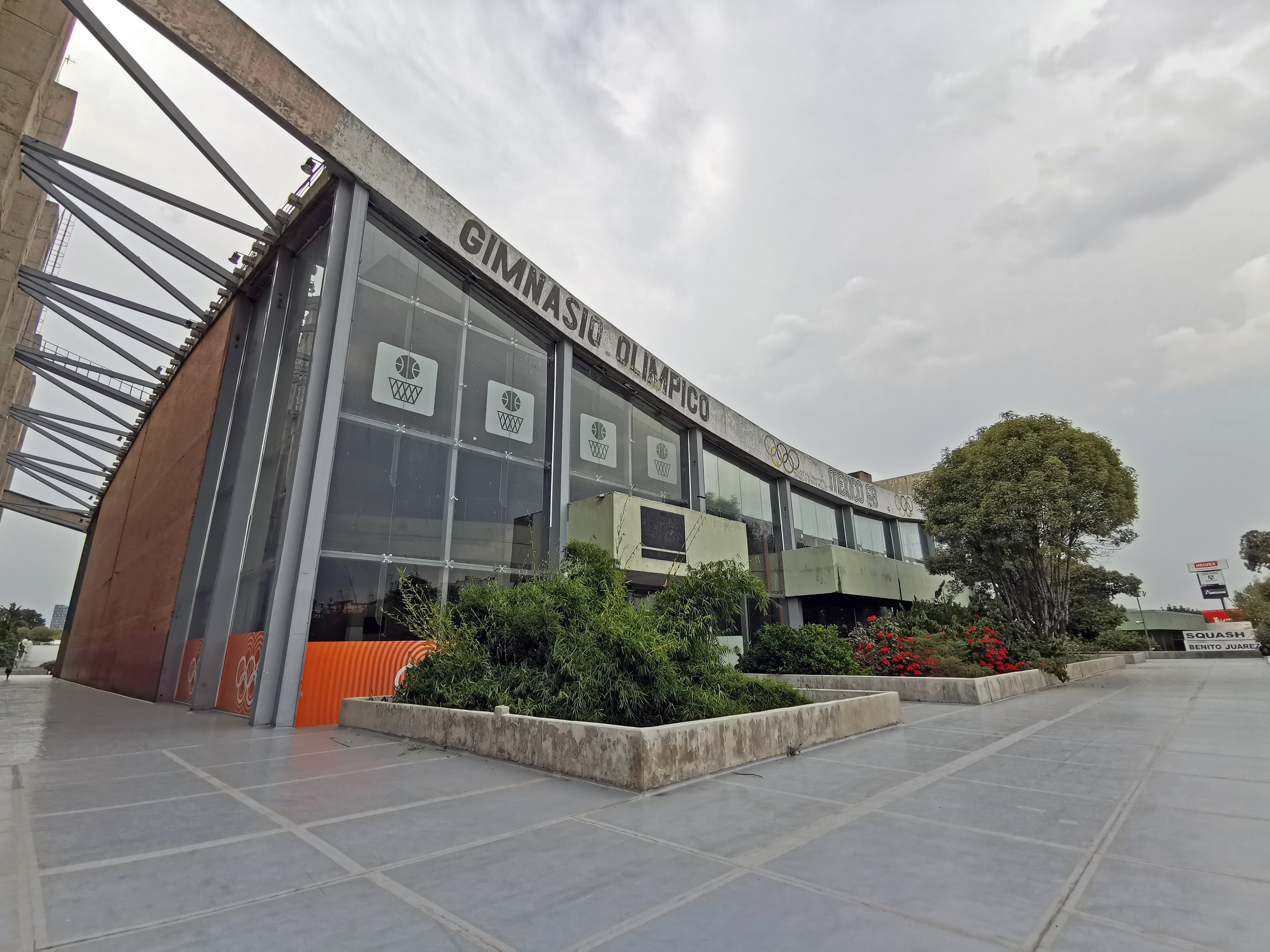
Héroes Inmortales took place at Gimnasio Olímpico Juan de la Barrera in Mexico City, Mexico.

In 1992, then-booker of Consejo Mundial de Lucha Libre (CMLL) Antonio Peña left CMLL alongside a number of wrestlers to form the Mexican professional wrestling promotion Asistencia Asesoría y Administración, later known as Lucha Libre AAA Worldwide (AAA). AAA would later become one of the biggest wrestling companies in the world. On October 5, 2006, Peña died from a heart attack. On October 7, 2007, AAA held the inaugural Antonio Peña Memorial Show ("Homenaje a Antonio Peña" in Spanish). The event became an annual tradition, and in 2009, the event was rebranded as Héroes Inmortales (Spanish for "Immortal Heroes"). AAA retroactively rebranded the 2007 and 2008 events as Héroes Inmortales I and Héroes Inmortales II, respectively.

On August 16, 2026, AAA announced that the 18th Héroes Inmortales would take place on Saturday, October 24, at Gimnasio Olímpico Juan de la Barrera in Mexico City, Mexico. The event would be broadcast as a three-week TV special on Lucha Libre AAA every Saturday from October 24 to November 7.

At Night 1 of Triplemanía 34, AAA announced that AAA President Marisela Peña would be inducted into the AAA Hall of Fame at Héroes Inmortales.

=== Broadcast outlets ===
As part of the media rights agreement with Fox in Latin America that was announced on November 25, 2025, Héroes Inmortales aired live across Fox platforms in Latin America. The event was livestreamed on WWE and AAA's YouTube channels and Facebook pages outside of Latin America.

=== Storylines ===
Héroes Inmortales features professional wrestling matches, with different wrestlers involved in pre-existing scripted feuds, plots and storylines. Results were predetermined by AAA's booking team and WWE's writers, while storylines were produced on AAA and WWE events. The wrestlers portrayed either heels (referred to as rudos in Mexico, those that play the part of the "bad guys") or faces (técnicos in Mexico, the "good guy" characters) as they perform.

On the October 3, 2026, episode of Lucha Libre AAA, La Parka defended the AAA Latin American Championship against his friend Mr. Iguana, but the match ended in a no contest after the AAA World Trios Champions Los Perros del Mal (Daga, Angel, and Berto) intervened, attacking both Parka and Iguana. Niño Hamburguesa then came out to save Parka and Iguana. AAA then announced that Perros del Mal would defend the AAA World Trios Championship against Parka, Iguana, and Hamburguesa at Héroes Inmortales.

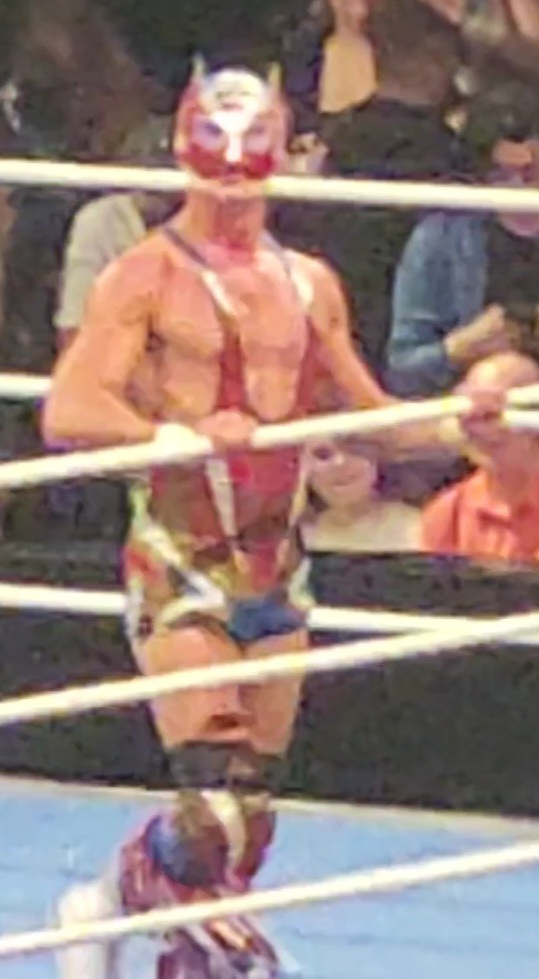
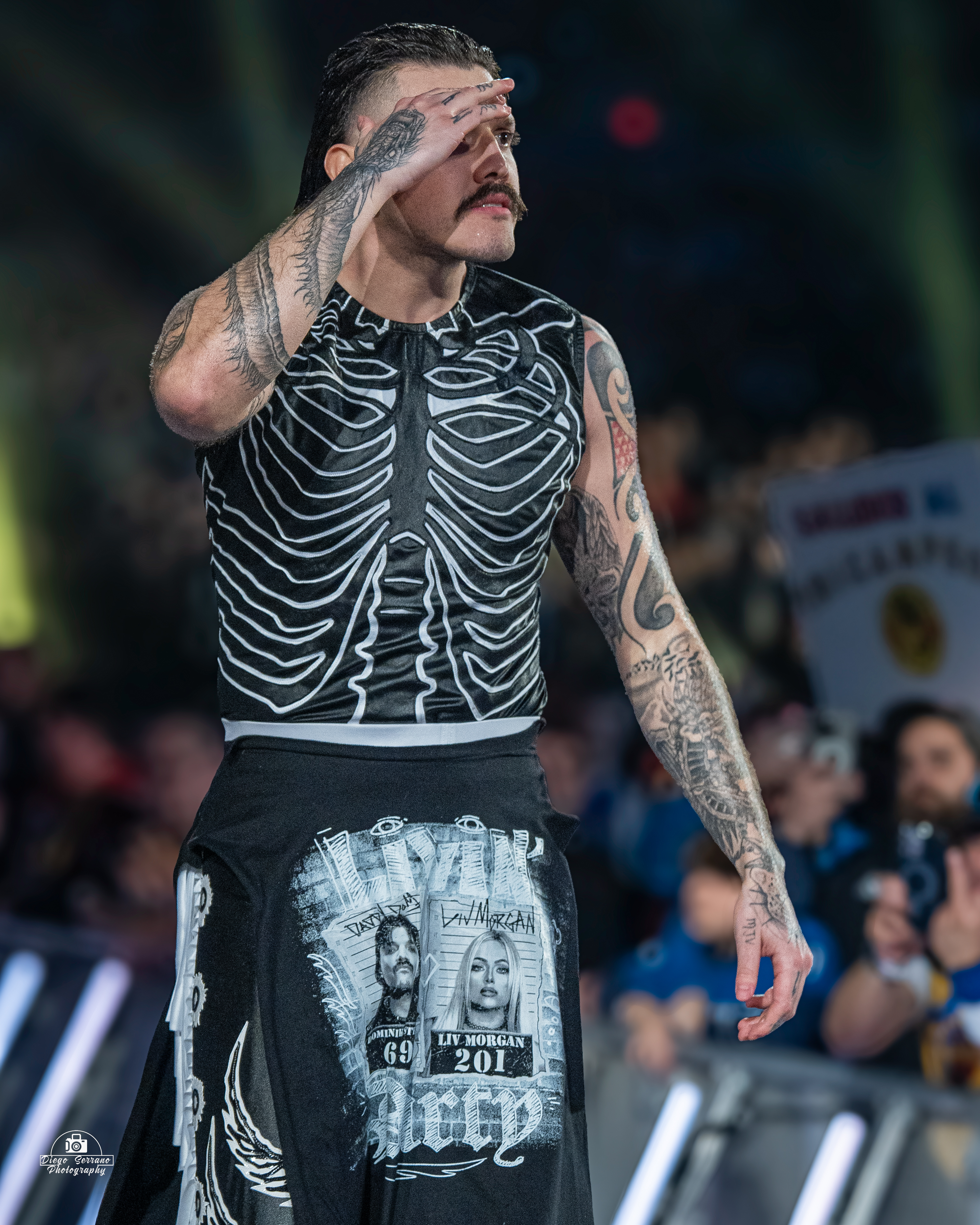
A Triplemanía 34 rematch for the AAA Mega Championship took place at Héroes Inmortales between defending champion El Grande Americano and Dominik Mysterio.

At Night 2 of Triplemanía 34 on September 13, El Grande Americano defeated Dominik Mysterio to win the AAA Mega Championship after AAA General Manager Rey Mysterio got involved as the replacement referee. On the October 3 episode of Lucha Libre AAA, Dominik's manager Dorian Roldán vied for the result of the match between Americano and Dominik to be overturned as Roldán claimed that Mysterio did not have a referee license. Roldán also threatened to sue if his request was not granted. Americano then challenged El Ojo (Dominik and Omos) to a tag team match against Rey and him where if El Ojo won, Dominik would receive his title rematch, but if El Ojo loses, Dominik could no longer challenge for the title during Americano's reign. Later that night during their match, Dominik forcibly removed Rey's mask and hit Americano with the championship belt to win the match. AAA then made the title rematch official at Héroes Inmortales.

On the October 10 episode of Lucha Libre AAA, Mini Vikingo defeated Jack Cartwheel, Joaquin Wilde, and Nobu San in a fatal four-way match to earn the right to face Rey Fénix for the AAA World Cruiserweight Championship at Héroes Inmortales.

Ten years after the death of Abismo Negro, Eterno would begin to wrestle under the name "Abismo Negro Jr.", and Negro's son would begin his professional wrestling career under the name "El Fiscal" three years later. Fiscal and Negro Jr. would become members of Los Vipers, the stable Negro co-founded; Fiscal, Negro Jr., and Psicosis would win the AAA World Trios Championship. Tensions between Fiscal and Negro Jr. began at the Orígenes event on June 22, 2024, when Negro Jr. pushed Fiscal away to steal Fiscal's pin attempt despite being on the same team. Their feud progressed three months later as Los Los Vipers competed in a trios match against Los Psycho Circus (Dave the Clown, Murder Clown, and Panic Clown). During the match, Psicosis tried to stop Fiscal and Negro Jr. from fighting each other; Negro Jr. would later try to burn Dave with a flamethrower, but Dave evaded and Negro Jr. burned Fiscal instead. A month later at Héroes Inmortales XVI, Fiscal would lose to Matt Riddle after Negro Jr. and Alberto El Patrón attacked Fiscal. Following the match, Negro Jr. took off Fiscal's mask and burned Fiscal with a flamethrower as Negro Jr. proclaimed that he is the one giving life to the Abismo Negro character. In a AAA World Trios Championship defense against Los Psycho Circus a month later, Fiscal blocked a flamethrower blast by Negro Jr. before sending Negro Jr. down crashing through a table; Los Vipers would go on to lose the title to Los Psycho Circus. On February 1, 2025, at a "Alianzas" event, Fiscal and Negro Jr. fought in a Bull Terrier match, where Negro Jr. came out victorious, and then Los Vipers attacked Fiscal. Fiscal would later call out Negro Jr. for dishonoring the name and legacy of Fiscal's father, prompting Negro Jr. to ambush Fiscal. On the February 21, 2026, episode of Lucha Libre AAA, Fiscal and Negro Jr. fought each other, which ended via disqualification after Fiscal pushed the referee away when the referee tried to stop Fiscal from continuing to attack Negro Jr. at ringside. Two weeks later, Fiscal prevented Negro Jr. from advancing to the Rey de Reyes tournament final by brawling with Negro Jr. during the match. Fiscal and Negro Jr. fought once again three weeks later with Fiscal defeating Negro Jr. Following the match, Negro Jr. dropped Fiscal's head onto the announce table, and Fiscal was brought backstage on a stretcher. At Night 2 of Triplemanía 34, both Fiscal and Negro Jr. competed in the Copa Bardahl, where they eliminated each other. On the September 28 episode of Lucha Libre AAA, Iguana defeated Los Vipers member Taurus, prompting Negro Jr. to attack Iguana; Fiscal then came out to save Iguana. On the October 17 episode, Taurus defeated Fiscal with the help of Negro Jr. Following the match, Fiscal challenged Negro Jr. to a match at Héroes Inmortales, which was later made official.

At Ola de Calor on August 30, La Catalina and La Hiedra were the final competitors in a gauntlet match for the right to challenge Hiedra's Las Tóxicas stablemate and then-AAA Reina de Reinas Champion Flammer for the title at Triplemanía 34. With Flammer at ringside, Flammer attempted to help Hiedra win by hitting Catalina with the title belt, but Catalina evaded and Hiedra got hit instead, which allowed Catalina to take advantage and win the match. Catalina would go on to dethrone Flammer at Night 2 of Triplemanía 34, winning the AAA Reina de Reinas Championship. On the October 17 episode of Lucha Libre AAA, Las Tóxicas (Flammer, Hiedra, and Maravilla) interrupted Catalina, who used Hiedra being one-half of the AAA World Mixed Tag Team Champions and pointed out that Flammer did not give title opportunities to Hiedra and Maravilla to instigate turmoil between Hiedra and Flammer, but Maravilla tried to stop Catalina's goal. Catalina then said that she would speak to AAA General Manager Rey Mysterio for her next challenger; Hiedra and Flammer would later speak to Mysterio separately as well. Later that night, Mysterio announced that Catalina would defend the AAA Reina de Reinas Championship against both Flammer and Hiedra in a triple threat match at Héroes Inmortales.

== Event ==
=== Week 1 ===
Other on-screen personnel
Role	Name
Commentators	José Manuel Guillén
Commentators	Roberto Figueroa
English commentators	Corey Graves
English commentators	John "Bradshaw" Layfield
English commentators	Rey Mysterio
Ring announcer	Jesús Zuñiga
Referees	El Hijo del Terantes
Referees	Suavecito
Referees	Adrian Butler

==== Preliminary matches ====
The event opened with a trios match for the AAA World Trios Championship between defending champions Los Perros del Mal (Daga, Angel, and Berto), accompanied by Karmen Petrovic, and the team of La Parka, Mr. Iguana, and Niño Hamburguesa. The match immediately began when Parka, Iguana, and Hamburguesa ambushed Los Perros del Mal. As Parka attacked Angel, Daga tagged in unbeknownst to Parka. Daga then hit Parka's groin before successfully pinning Parka to retain the title.

In the penultimate match, La Catalina defended the AAA Reina de Reinas Championship in a triple threat match against Las Tóxicas members Flammer and La Hiedra, who were accompanied by Maravilla. For the majority of the match, Flammer and Hiedra worked together against Maravilla. That alliance broke after Flammer accidentally knocked Hiedra out of the ring. After Flammer attacked Catalina, Hiedra threw Flammer out of the ring for an unsuccessful pinfall attempt, which prompted an argument between Flammer and Hiedra. Maravilla then gave the title belt to Hiedra, and then Hiedra tried to hit Catalina with the title belt, but Catalina evaded and Hiedra almost hit Flammer. Catalina then pushed Flammer towards Hiedra, which knocked Hiedra out of the ring. Catalina then attacked Flammer with her knee before successfully pinning Flammer to retain the title.

==== Main event ====
In the main event, El Grande Americano defended the AAA Mega Championship against Dominik Mysterio, who was accompanied by Dorian Roldán. Before the match started, Roldán hit Americano with a steel chair, which allowed Mysterio to take the advantage early. When Americano attempted a comeback, Mysterio's El Ojo stablemate Omos appeared at ringside, which distracted Americano enough to return the momentum to Mysterio. After Americano mounted a comeback, Americano was tripped by Omos. Pimpinela Escarlata, who was sitting in the front row, hit Omos, which prompted Omos to grab Escarlata, but Americano attacked Omos before Omos could attack Escarlate. As Americano later attempted a pinfall, Omos pulled the referee out of the ring; Omos then attacked Americano. AAA General Manager Rey Mysterio appeared and attacked Omos with a steel chair. Rey then hit Dominik with the steel chair, which allowed Americano to hit Dominik with a headbutt. Americano then pinned Dominik to retain the AAA Mega Championship.

=== Week 2 ===
Other on-screen personnel
Role	Name
Commentators	José Manuel Guillén
Commentators	Roberto Figueroa
English commentators	Corey Graves
English commentators	John "Bradshaw" Layfield
English commentators	Rey Mysterio
Ring announcer	Jesús Zuñiga
Referees	El Hijo del Terantes
Referees	Jeremy Marcus
Referees	Adrian Butler

==== Preliminary matches ====
The event opened with a promo by one-half of the AAA World Mixed Tag Team Champions Laredo Kid. He stated his intent to go after Rey Fénix's AAA World Cruiserweight Championship; Fénix was scheduled to hold an open challenge. Jack Cartwheel then attacked Kid before expressing that he wants the AAA World Cruiserweight Championship. Takuma then ambushed Cartwheel to utter the same goal. The three wrestlers then briefly attacked each other to a standoff before Fénix came out to announce that he would be defending his title against Kid, Cartwheel, and Takuma in a fatal four-way match later that night.

The first match of the night was The Wagner Brother's (El Hijo de Dr. Wagner Jr. and Galeno) defense of the AAA World Tag Team Championship against Los Vipers (Taurus and Histeria). Late into the match, Wagner Jr. dove to the outside onto Taurus. The Wagner Brothers then worked together against Histeria, which culminated with Galeno landing a frog splash on Histeria, in which Galeno dove off the top rope while moving his arms and legs inward and outward onto a supine Histeria. The Wagner Brothers then retained the title via pinfall.

Next, Pagano and El Carnicero wrestled Los Psycho Circus (Murder Clown and Dave the Clown), which ended with Carnicero executing a chokeslam on Dave, in which Carnicero lifted Dave up by the neck before slamming Dave down, to get the pinfall victory. Following the match, a limping Psycho Clown arrived with a kendo stick in hand to attack Pagano and Carnicero, but Pagano and Carnicero eventually retaliated.

==== Main event ====
In the main event, Rey Fénix defended the AAA World Cruiserweight Championship in a fatal four-way match against Laredo Kid, Jack Cartwheel, and Takuma. Late into the match, Cartwheel dove to the outside onto Kid. As Cartwheel got on the top rope, Takuma pushed him to the outside. Fénix then executed the "Mexican Muscle Buster" on Takuma, in which Fénix positioned Takuma upside down on his shoulders before sitting down while dropping Takuma back-first, before pinning Takuma to retain the title.

=== Week 3 ===
Other on-screen personnel
Role	Name
Commentators	José Manuel Guillén
Commentators	Roberto Figueroa
English commentators	Corey Graves
English commentators	John "Bradshaw" Layfield
English commentators	Rey Mysterio
Ring announcer	Jesús Zuñiga
Referees	Jeremy Marcus
Referees	Suavecito

==== Preliminary matches ====
The opening match of Week 3 was a triple threat match featuring Bravo Americano, who was accompanied by Rayo Americano, Cruz Del Toro, who was accompanied by Joaquin Wilde, and Kento, who was accompanied by Nobu. Late into the match, Wilde accidentally blinded Del Toro with a blast from his hairspray. Bravo then executed a frog splash on Del Toro to get the pinfall victory.

In the event's final match, El Fiscal fought Abismo Negro Jr., which ended with Negro Jr. getting disqualified after he hit Fiscal with the steel steps. Negro Jr. then repeatedly hit Fiscal with a steel chair.

==== Main event ====
The event capped off with the AAA Hall of Fame induction ceremony for AAA President Marisela Peña. AAA General Manager Rey Mysterio gave a speech about the Peña family's influence on the professional wrestling industry. As Peña began her speech, she was interrupted by Dorian Roldán, her son and manager of El Ojo. Roldán said that he had filed a formal complaint against Mysterio for his position as general manager, claiming that Mysterio placed wrestlers in dangerous working conditions and that Mysterio had been abusing his power. Roldán then announced that Mysterio had been suspended before claiming that Mysterio and Peña were having an extramarital affair.

== Results ==
Week 1 (October 24)
No.	Results	Stipulations	Times
1	Los Perros del Mal (Daga, Angel, and Berto) (c) (with Karmen Petrovic) defeated La Parka, Mr. Iguana, and Niño Hamburguesa by pinfall	Trios match for the AAA World Trios Championship	9:02
2	La Catalina (c) defeated Flammer and La Hiedra by pinfall	Triple threat match for the AAA Reina de Reinas Championship	7:57
3	El Grande Americano (c) defeated Dominik Mysterio (with Dorian Roldán) by pinfall	Singles match for the AAA Mega Championship	11:58
(c) / – the champion(s) heading into the match

Week 2 (October 31)
No.	Results	Stipulations	Times
1	The Wagner Brothers (El Hijo de Dr. Wagner Jr. and Galeno) (c) defeated Los Vipers (Taurus and Histeria) by pinfall	Tag team match for the AAA World Tag Team Championship	6:27
2	Pagano and El Carnicero defeated Los Psycho Circus (Murder Clown and Dave the Clown) by pinfall	Tag team match	5:31
3	Rey Fénix (c) defeated Jack Cartwheel, Laredo Kid, and Takuma by pinfall (Note: Mini Vikingo was Fénix's original challenger, but due to Vikingo suffering an injury during a match in the Dusty Rhodes Tag Team Classic, he was not cleared to compete at Héroes Inmortales.)	Fatal four-way match for the AAA World Cruiserweight Championship; This was an open challenge.	11:07
(c) / – the champion(s) heading into the match

Week 3 (November 7)
No.	Results	Stipulations	Times
1	Bravo Americano (with Rayo Americano) defeated Cruz Del Toro (with Joaquin Wilde) and Kento (with Nobu) by pinfall	Triple threat match	7:24
2	El Fiscal defeated Abismo Negro Jr. via disqualification	Singles match	7:19
