= El Fiscal (disambiguation) =

El Fiscal (Spanish "The Prosecutor") is a 2005 novel by R.S. Pratt

It may refer to:

- El Fiscal, a 1993 novel by Augusto Roa Bastos
- El Fiscal, TV series on Colombia's RCN Televisión 1995–1999

== See also ==
- Fiscal (disambiguation)
