= Héroes Inmortales VII =

2013 Lucha Libre AAA World Wide event

- Promotional poster featuring various AAA wrestlers
- Promotion: AAA
- Date: October 18, 2013
- City: Puebla, Puebla
- Venue: Gimnasio Miguel Hidalgo
- Attendance: 4,700

Event chronology
← Previous; Triplemanía XXI	Next → Guerra de Titanes

Héroes Inmortales Shows chronology
← Previous; VI	Next → VIII

Héroes Inmortales VII (Spanish for "Immortal Heroes VII") was a professional wrestling event produced by the AAA promotion. The event, which commemorated the seventh anniversary of the death of AAA founder Antonio Peña, took place on October 18, 2013, at Gimnasio Miguel Hidalgo in Puebla, Puebla. While the 2011 and 2012 Peña memorial shows were both simply billed as Héroes Inmortales, the 2013 edition returned to using a Roman numeral, VII for seven, in its name. The event was headlined by El Texano Jr. defending the AAA Mega Championship against Psycho Clown and also featured the annual Copa Antonio Peña. The event also included a memorial ceremony for AAA wrestler and the uncle of Psycho Clown, El Brazo, who died due to complications from diabetes three days before the event.

== Production ==
=== Background ===
On October 5, 2006, founder of the Mexican professional wrestling, company AAA Antonio Peña died from a heart attack. The following year, on October 7, 2007, Peña's brother-in-law Jorge Roldan who had succeeded Peña as head of AAA held a show in honor of Peña's memory, the first ever Antonio Peña Memorial Show (Homenaje a Antonio Peña in Spanish). AAA made the tribute to Peña into a major annual event that would normally take place in October of each year, renaming the show series Héroes Inmortales (Spanish for "Immortal Heroes"), retroactively rebranding the 2007 and 2008 event as Héroes Inmortales I and Héroes Inmortales II. As part of their annual tradition AAA holds a Copa Antonio Peña ("Antonio Peña Cup") tournament with various wrestlers from AAA or other promotions competing for the trophy. The tournament is normally either a gauntlet match or a multi-man torneo cibernetico elimination match. Outside of the actual Copa Antonio Peña trophy the winner is not guaranteed any other "prizes" as a result of winning, although several Copa Antonio Peña winners did go on to challenge for the AAA Mega Championship. The 2013 show was the seventh show in the Héroes Inmortales series of shows.

=== Storylines ===
The Héroes Inmortales show featured eight professional wrestling matches with different wrestlers involved in pre-existing, scripted feuds, plots, and storylines. Wrestlers were portrayed as either heels (referred to as rudos in Mexico, those that portray the "bad guys") or faces (técnicos in Mexico, the "good guy" characters) as they followed a series of tension-building events, which culminated in a wrestling match or series of matches.

== Results ==
No.	Results	Stipulations
1	Dark Cuervo, Mamba, Mari Apache and Mini Abismo Negro defeated El Elegido, Faby Apache, Octagóncito and Pimpinela Escarlata	Relevos Atómicos de Locura match
2	Fénix defeated El Mesías, Monster Clown and Silver King	Four-way elimination match in the first round of the 2013 Copa Antonio Peña
3	El Hijo del Fantasma defeated Axel, Daga, Octagón and Pentagón Jr.	Five-way elimination match in the first round of the 2013 Copa Antonio Peña
4	La Parka defeated Electroshock, Máscara Año 2000 Jr. and La Parka Negra	Four-way elimination match in the first round of the 2013 Copa Antonio Peña
5	Chessman defeated Cibernético, El Hijo del Perro Aguayo and Psicosis	Four-way elimination match in the first round of the 2013 Copa Antonio Peña
6	Los Güeros del Cielo (Angélico and Jack Evans) defeated Los Mexican Power (Crazy Boy and Joe Líder) (c) (with Juventud Guerrera), Aero Star and Drago and La Secta (Dark Escoria and Dark Espíritu)	Four-way elimination tag team match for the AAA World Tag Team Championship
7	El Texano Jr. (c) (with El Hijo del Fantasma) defeated Psycho Clown (with Murder Clown)	Singles match for the AAA Mega Championship
8	La Parka defeated Chessman, Fénix and El Hijo del Fantasma	Four-way elimination final match for the 2013 Copa Antonio Peña
(c) / – the champion(s) heading into the match

=== Copa Antonio Peña bracket ===
1st Round; Sin Limite: Héroes Inmortales VII; October 18, 2013 (Aired: October 26)
El Mesías	—
Fénix	Win (Note: This was a four-way elimination match.)
Monster Clown	—
Silver King	—
Axel	—
Daga	—
El Hijo del Fantasma	Win
Octagón	—
Electroshock	—
La Parka	Win
Máscara Año 2000 Jr.	—
La Parka Negra	—
Chessman	Win
Cibernético	—
El Hijo del Perro Aguayo	—
Psicosis	—

Final; Sin Limite: Héroes Inmortales VII; October 18, 2013 (Aired: October 26)
Fénix	—
El Hijo del Fantasma	—
La Parka	Win (Note: Order of elimination: Chessman, Fénix, El Hijo del Fantasma)
Chessman	—
