= Guerra de Titanes (2025) =

AAA professional wrestling event

- Promotional poster featuring various wrestlers from AAA and WWE
- Promotion(s): Lucha Libre AAA Worldwide; WWE (Note: WWE handled the production of this event.)
- Date: December 20, 2025
- City: Guadalajara, Jalisco, Mexico
- Venue: Arena Guadalajara

Event chronology
← Previous; Héroes Inmortales XVII	Next → Rey de Reyes

Guerra de Titanes chronology
← Previous; 2024	Next → 2026

The 2025 Guerra de Titanes (Spanish for "War of the Titans") was a professional wrestling event produced by the Mexican professional wrestling promotion Lucha Libre AAA Worldwide (AAA), in partnership with its parent company WWE. The event took place on Saturday, December 20, 2025, at Arena Guadalajara in Guadalajara, Jalisco, Mexico. It was the 26th Guerra de Titanes show promoted by AAA since 1997, and was the first Guerra de Titanes to be held under WWE's ownership of AAA. Additionally, wrestlers from WWE's Raw, SmackDown, Evolve, and NXT brands also appeared. The event was streamed live on WWE's YouTube channel with English and Spanish commentary.

The event comprised seven matches. The prominent matches of the event include El Hijo de Dr. Wagner Jr. defeating Ethan Page to retain the AAA Latin American Championship. Pagano and Los Psycho Circus (Psycho Clown, Murder Clown, and Dave The Clown) defeated The Wyatt Sicks (Uncle Howdy, Dexter Lumis, Joe Gacy, and Erick Rowan) in a Carnival of Carnage match. Laredo Kid defeated Je'Von Evans and Jack Cartwheel in a triple threat match to retain the AAA World Cruiserweight Championship. El Hijo del Vikingo defeated Dragon Lee. In the main event, Rey Fénix and Rey Mysterio defeated Los Gringos Locos 2.0 (Dominik Mysterio and El Grande Americano).

== Production ==
=== Background ===
Starting in 1997, the Mexican professional wrestling company AAA has held a major wrestling show late in the year, either November or December, called Guerra de Titanes ("War of the Titans"). The show often features championship matches or Lucha de Apuestas or bet matches where the competitors risked their wrestling mask or hair on the outcome of the match. In Lucha Libre, the Lucha de Apuetas match is considered more prestigious than a championship match and many major shows feature one or more Apuesta matches. The Guerra de Titanes show is hosted in a new location each year, emanating from cities such as Madero, Chihuahua City, Mexico City, Guadalajara, Jalisco and others. In 2016, AAA moved the Guerra de Titanes show to January but in 2018 the show was held in December which continued with the 2019 event.

On October 25, 2025, during Héroes Inmortales XVII, Rey Mysterio announced that Guerra de Titanes will take place on December 20, 2025, at Arena Guadalajara in Guadalajara, Jalisco, Mexico.

=== Storylines ===
Guerra de Titanes featured several professional wrestling matches, with different wrestlers involved in pre-existing scripted feuds, plots and storylines. Wrestlers portrayed either heels (referred to as rudos in Mexico, those that portray the "bad guys") or faces (técnicos in Mexico, the "good guy" characters) as they follow a series of tension-building events, which culminated in wrestling matches.

At WWE Worlds Collide on September 12, El Hijo de Dr. Wagner Jr. successfully defended the AAA Latin American Championship against NXT North American Champion Ethan Page in a fatal four-way match, although Page was not pinned. After the event, Page and Wagner continued their rivalry, culminating in a Day of the Dead match at NXT Halloween Havoc, where Page retained his title. At AAA Alianzas on November 2, Page attacked Wagner after his successful title defense and announced that he will face Wagner for the AAA Latin American Championship at Guerra de Titanes.

== Events ==
Other on-screen personnel
Role	Name
Commentators	José Manuel Guillén
Commentators	Roberto Figueroa
English commentators	Corey Graves
English commentators	John "Bradshaw" Layfield
English commentators	Konnan
Ring announcer	Jesús Zuñiga
Referees	Suavecito
Referees	El Hijo del Tirantes
Referees	El Piero
Referees	Adrian Butler
Interviewer	Sarah Schreiber

=== Preliminary matches ===
The opening contest was a four-way tag team match featuring Los Americanos (Bravo Americano and Rayo Americano), Mr. Iguana and Niño Hamburguesa, La Parka and Octagon Jr., and Cruz Del Toro and Joaquin Wilde of the Latino World Order (LWO). Parka and Rayo traded offense before Los Americanos gained the advantage with double-team headbutts. The LWO took control by using frequent tags to isolate Bravo. Hamburguesa cleared the ring and allowed Iguana to perform a headscissors on Parka. The action spilled to the outside with Iguana, Octagon Jr., Bravo, and Wilde simultaneously diving to the floor. Parka hit a moonsault onto a group of competitors at ringside. Octagon Jr. hit a poison rana to Wilde for a pinfall attempt that got interrupted. Hamburguesa neutralized the LWO with a cannonball in the corner. Octagon Jr. dove to the outside, leaving Parka to hit a twisting brainbuster on Del Toro to secure the pinfall victory. Octagon Jr. and Parka celebrated with professional boxer Canelo Álvarez.

The first title bout of the event saw El Hijo de Dr. Wagner Jr. defend the AAA Latin American Championship against Ethan Page. The match was officiated by controversial referee El Hijo del Tirantes, who has a history of biased officiating. The two had an early technical exchange before Wagner gained the early advantage following a dropkick from behind. Page cut off Wagner’s momentum with a powerslam. Page tried to unmask Wagner, but Wagner regained control with a sit-out powerbomb. Page managed to twist Wagner's mask to blind him, followed by a powerbomb. Page exited the ring to take the championship belt and a wrench. While the referee was distracted by the belt, Page struck Wagner in the chest with the wrench. Tirantes performed a fast count, appearing to crown Page as the new champion. However, the decision was immediately contested by Mr. Iguana, who informed the referee of Page's use of a wrench. Tirantes restarted the match. As Page argued the decision, Wagner capitalized on the distraction with the Wagner Driver to secure the pinfall victory and retain the title.

The next match was the Carnival of Carnage match between The Wyatt Sicks (Uncle Howdy, Dexter Lumis, Joe Gacy, and Erick Rowan) and Pagano and Los Psycho Circus (Psycho Clown, Murder Clown, and Dave the Clown). Pagano and Los Psycho circus appeared via video to welcome everyone to the "carnival of destruction". The Wyatt Sicks went backstage to go to a carnival-themed area. With the assistance of Mascarita Sagrada, Pagano and Los Psycho Circus attacked the Wyatt Sicks before being neutralized by Gacy. Rowan powerbombed Pagano through a stack of tables. Gacy and Lumis were briefly distracted by Pimpinela Escarlata before they resumed their assault on Murder Clown. The match returned to the ring, where the Wyatt Sicks isolated Psycho Clown. Murder Clown and Rowan had a physical confrontation with Rowan coming out on top. Pagano cleared the field with a kendo stick. Dave, Pagano, and Murder Clown dove to the floor. Psycho Clown secured the victory with a Death Valley Driver on Lumis through a table.

The fourth match was a triple threat match for the AAA Cruiserweight Championship, featuring the defending champion Laredo Kid against Je’Von Evans and Jack Cartwheel. All three competitors traded rapid-fire pinning combinations and dropkicks, ending in a standoff. Cartwheel hit a springboard senton to Kid for a near-fall. Evans cleared the ring with acrobatic moves. Cartwheel executed a tiger drop to the outside and a slingshot 450° splash in the ring for a two-count. Evans performed the OG Cutter on Kid, a dive to Cartwheel on the floor, and a frog splash to Kid in the ring, although he was unable to secure the pin. Kid regained control by tossing Evans onto Cartwheel and connecting with a 450° splash. All three men exchanged superkicks and high-impact moves, including Evans intercepting Cartwheel's Phoenix Splash with the OG Cutter. After Evans was neutralized, Kid hit an inverted DDT from the top rope on Cartwheel to secure the pinfall.

Next, a six-woman tag team match featured Natalya, Lola Vice, and Faby Apache against Las Tóxicas (Flammer, La Hiedra, and Maravilla). Vice hit rapid-fire strikes early. Las Tóxicas gained the momentum with double-team tactics to isolate Vice. While the referee was distracted by Natalya and Apache, Flammer attacked Vice with the ring steps. Las Tóxicas continued to assault Vice, but she managed to tag in Natalya, who cleared the ring and hit a powerbomb on Flammer for a near-fall. Apache then tagged in to hit the Hart Attack. As Apache and Flammer traded high-impact strikes, Apache eventually hit a bridging dragon suplex, securing the pinfall victory for her team.

The following match was Dragon Lee against El Hijo del Vikingo. Lee attacked Vikingo during the introductions. Vikingo gained control by sending Lee into the ring steps. Vikingo tied Lee’s mask to the bottom rope and attacked him, which led to Lee's mask getting damaged. Vikingo hit two shooting star presses for a near-fall. Lee countered a 450° splash with the Styles Clash. As he attempted to do a dive, Vikingo pulling the referee into the path, incapacitating the referee. Lee hit the Operation Dragon but was did not get a count. Vikingo then hit a low blow. Omos appeared to powerbomb Lee and force the referee to count the pinfall, giving Vikingo the victory. AAA Director General Dorian Roldán celebrated with Vikingo and Omos to formally announce them as the new iteration of the El Ojo stable.

=== Main event ===
The main event featured a tag team match between Los Gringos Locos 2.0 (Dominik Mysterio and El Grande Americano) and Rey Fénix and Rey Mysterio. Fénix and Americano had a technical exchange early. When Rey and Dominik tagged in, Dominik immediately exited the ring, refusing to engage with his father initially. Los Gringos Locos 2.0 employed frequent tags and strikes to prevent Fénix from tagging out. Fénix delivered a double enzuigiri, allowing for a hot tag to Rey who executed a moonsault for a near-fall. Dominik attempted the Three Amigos, but Rey countered the third suplex with a DDT. Fénix assisted Rey with a powerbomb into a seated senton, though Americano broke the ensuing pinfall. As Dominik attempted to unmask his father, Americano prepared to use a metal plate but was halted by Penta who took the metal plate and placed it in his own mask. While Fénix neutralized Americano with a dive to the floor, Penta headbutted Dominik with the metal plate. Rey hit the 619 followed by a leg drop on Dominik to secure the pinfall victory.

== Results ==
No.	Results	Stipulations	Times
1	La Parka and Octagón Jr. defeated Los Americanos (Bravo Americano and Rayo Americano), Mr. Iguana and Niño Hamburguesa, and Latino World Order (Cruz Del Toro and Joaquin Wilde) by pinfall	Fatal four-way tag team match	9:36
2	El Hijo de Dr. Wagner Jr. (c) defeated Ethan Page by pinfall (Note: The match was originally won by Page, but referee El Hijo del Tirantes restarted the match after Mr. Iguana informed him of Page's illegal use of a foreign object to earn his pinfall.)	Singles match for the AAA Latin American Championship	5:50
3	Pagano and Los Psycho Circus (Psycho Clown, Murder Clown, and Dave The Clown) (with Mascarita Sagrada and Pimpinela Escarlata) defeated The Wyatt Sicks (Uncle Howdy, Dexter Lumis, Joe Gacy, and Erick Rowan) by pinfall	Carnival of Carnage match	10:27
4	Laredo Kid (c) defeated Je'Von Evans and Jack Cartwheel by pinfall	Triple threat match for the AAA World Cruiserweight Championship	12:31
5	Faby Apache, Natalya, and Lola Vice defeated Las Tóxicas (Flammer, La Hiedra, and Maravilla) by pinfall	Six-woman tag team match	7:40
6	El Hijo del Vikingo defeated Dragon Lee by pinfall	Singles match	17:50
7	Rey Fénix and Rey Mysterio (with Penta) defeated Los Gringos Locos 2.0 (Dominik Mysterio and El Grande Americano) by pinfall	Tag team match	17:28
(c) / – the champion(s) heading into the match
