= Héroes Inmortales (2012) =

2012 Lucha Libre AAA World Wide event

- Promotional poster featuring La Parka, Dr. Wagner Jr., El Mesías, Cibernético, El Hijo del Perro Aguayo, Jeff Jarrett and L.A. Park
- Promotion: AAA
- Date: October 7, 2012
- City: San Luis Potosí, San Luis Potosí
- Venue: Domo Centro de Espectaculos
- Attendance: 5,000

Event chronology
← Previous; Triplemanía XX	Next → Guerra de Titanes

Héroes Inmortales Shows chronology
← Previous; 2011	Next → 2013

Héroes Inmortales (2012) (Spanish for "Immortal Heroes") was a professional wrestling event produced by the AAA promotion, which took place on October 7, 2012, at Domo Centro de Espectaculos in San Luis Potosí, San Luis Potosí, commemorating the sixth anniversary of the death of AAA founder Antonio Peña.

== Production ==
=== Background ===
On October 5, 2006, founder of the Mexican professional wrestling, company AAA Antonio Peña died from a heart attack. The following year, on October 7, 2007, Peña's brother-in-law Jorge Roldan who had succeeded Peña as head of AAA held a show in honor of Peña's memory, the first ever Antonio Peña Memorial Show (Homenaje a Antonio Peña in Spanish). AAA made the tribute to Peña into a major annual event that would normally take place in October of each year, renaming the show series Héroes Inmortales (Spanish for "Immortal Heroes"), retroactively rebranding the 2007 and 2008 event as Héroes Inmortales I and Héroes Inmortales II. As part of their annual tradition AAA holds a Copa Antonio Peña ("Antonio Peña Cup") tournament with various wrestlers from AAA or other promotions competing for the trophy. The tournament is normally either a gauntlet match or a multi-man torneo cibernetico elimination match. Outside of the actual Copa Antonio Peña trophy the winner is not guaranteed any other "prizes" as a result of winning, although several Copa Antonio Peña winners did go on to challenge for the AAA Mega Championship. The 2012 show was the sixth show in the Héroes Inmortales series of shows.

=== Storylines ===
The Héroes Inmortales show featured six professional wrestling matches with different wrestlers involved in pre-existing, scripted feuds, plots, and storylines. Wrestlers were portrayed as either heels (referred to as rudos in Mexico, those that portray the "bad guys") or faces (técnicos in Mexico, the "good guy" characters) as they followed a series of tension-building events, which culminated in a wrestling match or series of matches.

== Results ==
No.	Results	Stipulations
1	Mini Charly Manson, Mini Histeria and Mini Psycho Clown defeated Dinastía, Mascarita Dorada and Octagóncito	Six man tag team match
2	Halloween and Mari Apache defeated Alan Stone and Jennifer Blake (c), Atomic Boy and Faby Apache, and Fénix and Lolita	Four-way tag team elimination match for the AAA World Mixed Tag Team Championship, with Sexy Star as special guest referee
3	Joe Líder and Vampiro defeated La Legión Extranjera (Abyss and Chessman) (c)	Tag team match for the AAA World Tag Team Championship
4	El Texano Jr. defeated El Alebrije III, Daga, El Elegido, Extreme Tiger, Heavy Metal, Héctor Garza, Juventud Guerrera, La Parka, El Mesías, Psycho Clown, Toscano, and Último Gladiador: The match was later declared a no contest due to El Texano Jr. winning with a low blow.	Copa Antonio Peña gauntlet match
5	El Consejo (Máscara Año 2000 Jr. and Silver King) and Jeff Jarrett (with Karen Jarrett) defeated Dr. Wagner Jr., L.A. Park and El Zorro	Six-man tag team match
6	Jack Evans and La Secta Bizarra Cibernetica (Cibernético, Dark Cuervo and Dark Ozz) defeated Los Perros del Mal (Halloween, El Hijo del Perro Aguayo, Psicosis and Teddy Hart): Halloween lost his hair to Dark Cuervo	Domo de la Muerte Hair vs. Hair Lucha de Apuestas
(c) / – the champion(s) heading into the match
