= Héroes Inmortales IV =

2010 Lucha Libre AAA World Wide event

- Official poster for the show
- Promotion: AAA
- Date: October 1, 2010
- City: Ciudad Madero, Tamaulipas, Mexico
- Venue: Centro de Convenciones

Event chronology
← Previous; Verano de Escándalo	Next → Guerra de Titanes

Héroes Inmortales Shows chronology
← Previous; III	Next → V

Héroes Inmortales IV (Spanish for "Immortal Heroes IV") was a major professional wrestling show event produced by AAA, which took place on October 1, 2010 at the Centro de Convenciones in Ciudad Madero, Tamaulipas, Mexico, commemorating the fourth anniversary of the death of AAA founder Antonio Peña.

== Production ==
=== Background ===
On October 5, 2006 founder of the Mexican professional wrestling, company AAA Antonio Peña died from a heart attack. The following year, on October 7, 2007, Peña's brother-in-law Jorge Roldan who had succeeded Peña as head of AAA held a show in honor of Peña's memory, the first ever Antonio Peña Memorial Show (Homenaje a Antonio Peña in Spanish). AAA made the tribute to Peña into a major annual event that would normally take place in October of each year, renaming the show series Héroes Inmortales (Spanish for "Immortal Heroes"), retroactively rebranding the 2007 and 2008 event as Héroes Inmortales I and Héroes Inmortales II. As part of their annual tradition AAA holds a Copa Antonio Peña ("Antonio Peña Cup") tournament with various wrestlers from AAA or other promotions competing for the trophy. The tournament is normally either a gauntlet match or a multi-man torneo cibernetico elimination match. Outside of the actual Copa Antonio Peña trophy the winner is not guaranteed any other "prizes" as a result of winning, although several Copa Antonio Peña winners did go on to challenge for the AAA Mega Championship. The 2010 show was the fourth show in the Héroes Inmortales series of shows.

=== Storylines ===
The Héroes Inmortales show featured eight professional wrestling matches with different wrestlers involved in pre-existing, scripted feuds, plots, and storylines. Wrestlers were portrayed as either heels (referred to as rudos in Mexico, those that portray the "bad guys") or faces (técnicos in Mexico, the "good guy" characters) as they followed a series of tension-building events, which culminated in a wrestling match or series of matches.

== Results ==
No.	Results	Stipulations
1	Crazy Boy, Esther Moreno, Pasion Crystal and Octagóncito defeated Jennifer Blake, Mini Psicosis, Tigre Cota and Yuriko	Relevos Atómicos de Locura match
2	Takashi Sugiura (c) defeated Chessman	Singles match for the GHC Heavyweight Championship
3	Faby Apache and Pimpinela Escarlata defeated La Legión Extranjera (Alex Koslov and Christina Von Eerie) (c)	Mixed tag team match for the AAA World Mixed Tag Team Championship
4	La Hermandad 187 (Joe Líder and Nicho el Millonario) defeated La Sociedad (Damián 666, Halloween and Konnan)	3-on-2 handicap hardcore match
5	Aero Star won the Copa Antonio Peña defeating Chris Stone, El Elegido, Laredo Kid, Decnnis, Alan Stone, Billy Boy and Súper Fly	torneo cibernetico match
6	Dr. Wagner, Jr. (c) (with Aero Star) defeated Silver King (with Tigre Cota)	Singles match for the AAA Mega Championship
7	El Mesías (with Crazy Boy) defeated El Hijo del Perro Aguayo (with Decnnis)	Singles match
8	Legado AAA (Dark Cuervo, Dark Ozz, (Note: Dark Cuervo and Dark Ozz replaced Cibernético and Octagón in the match.) Heavy Metal and La Parka) defeated La Sociedad (Electroshock, El Zorro, Hernandez and L.A. Park)	Elimination steel cage match
(c) / – the champion(s) heading into the match
