= Héroes Inmortales VIII =

2014 Lucha Libre AAA World Wide event

- Official poster for Héroes Inmortales VIII
- Promotion: Lucha Libre AAA World Wide
- Date: October 12, 2014
- City: San Luis Potosí, San Luis Potosí, Mexico
- Venue: Domo San Luis
- Attendance: 8,500

Event chronology
← Previous; Triplemanía XXII	Next → Guerra de Titanes

Héroes Inmortales Shows chronology
← Previous; VII	Next → IX

Héroes Inmortales VIII (Spanish for "Immortal Heroes Eight") was a professional wrestling event produced by the Lucha Libre AAA World Wide (AAA) promotion. The event, which commemorated the eight anniversary of the death of AAA founder Antonio Peña, took place on October 12, 2014, at Domo San Luis in San Luis Potosí, San Luis Potosí, Mexico and was taped for future television transmission. The event was headlined by El Mesías and El Patrón Alberto facing El Hijo del Perro Aguayo and El Texano, Jr., and also featured the annual Copa Antonio Peña.

== Production ==
=== Background ===
On October 5, 2006 founder of the Mexican professional wrestling, company Lucha Libre AAA World Wide (AAA, or Triple A) Antonio Peña died from a heart attack. The following year, on October 7, 2007, Peña's brother-in-law Jorge Roldan who had succeeded Peña as head of AAA held a show in honor of Peña's memory, the first ever Antonio Peña Memorial Show (Homenaje a Antonio Peña in Spanish). AAA made the tribute to Peña into a major annual event that would normally take place in October of each year, renaming the show series Héroes Inmortales (Spanish for "Immortal Heroes"), retroactively rebranding the 2007 and 2008 event as Héroes Inmortales I and Héroes Inmortales II. As part of their annual tradition AAA holds a Copa Antonio Peña ("Antonio Peña Cup") tournament with various wrestlers from AAA or other promotions competing for the trophy. The tournament is normally either a gauntlet match or a multi-man torneo cibernetico elimination match. Outside of the actual Copa Antonio Peña trophy the winner is not guaranteed any other "prizes" as a result of winning, although several Copa Antonio Peña winners did go on to challenge for the AAA Mega Championship. The 2014 show was the eighth show in the Héroes Inmortales series of shows.

=== Storylines ===
The Héroes Inmortales show featured five professional wrestling matches with different wrestlers involved in pre-existing, scripted feuds, plots, and storylines. Wrestlers were portrayed as either heels (referred to as rudos in Mexico, those that portray the "bad guys") or faces (técnicos in Mexico, the "good guy" characters) as they followed a series of tension-building events, which culminated in a wrestling match or series of matches.

== Results ==
No.	Results	Stipulations
1	Dinastía, Faby Apache, Niño Hamburguesa, and Pimpinela Escarlata defeated Eterno, Mamba, Mini Abismo Negro, and Taya	Relevos Atómicos de Locura match
2	El Hijo del Fantasma (c) defeated Angélico, Jack Evans, Joe Líder, Bengala, Aero Star, Súper Fly, and Steve Pain	Ladder match for the AAA World Cruiserweight Championship
3	Los Hell Brothers (Averno, Chessman, and Cibernético) defeated Los Psycho Circus (Monster Clown, Murder Clown, and Psycho Clown)	Street fight
4	Myzteziz defeated La Parka, Blue Demon, Jr., Australian Suicide, El Zorro, Pentagón, Jr., Fénix, and Daga	Lumberjack match for the 2014 Copa Antonio Peña
5	El Hijo del Perro Aguayo and El Texano, Jr. defeated El Mesías and El Patrón Alberto	Best two-out-of-three falls tag team match
(c) / – the champion(s) heading into the match
