= Héroes Inmortales =

Lucha Libre AAA World Wide event series

The Copa Antonio Peña (Spanish for "The Antonio Peña Cup") was an annual professional wrestling tournament held by Lucha Libre AAA Worldwide (AAA) once a year. The tournament was named in memory of Antonio Peña, the founder of AAA, who died on October 5, 2006. The tournament is part of the annual Antonio Peña Memorial show held annually around the anniversary of Peña's death. The tournament was a Gauntlet match featuring eight to thirteen AAA wrestlers ranging from mid-card to main eventers. The events are televised as a special feature on Televisa. The Cup was not defended like a championship and does not automatically give the winner a shot at the AAA Mega Championship. As is tradition with AAA major events the wrestlers compete inside a hexagonal wrestling ring and not the four sided ring the promotion uses for television events and house shows.

The 2025 Héroes Inmortales was the first event in the series not to feature the Copa Antonio Peña.

== Copa Antonio Peña winners ==
#	Winner	Times won	Date	Location	Notes	Ref
1	Charly Manson	1	October 7, 2007	Naucalpan, Mexico	Defeated Konnan in the tournament final.	
2	El Mesías	1	October 24, 2008	Veracruz, Mexico	Defeated Dark Cuervo in the tournament final.	
3	Cibernético	1	September 26, 2009	Monterrey, Mexico	Won a 12-man battle royal by last eliminating Konan Big.	
4	Aero Star	1	October 1, 2010	Tamaulipas, Mexico	Won an eight-man torneo cibernetico by last eliminating Chris Stone.	
5	Electroshock	1	October 9, 2011	Monterrey, Mexico	Won a nine-man gauntlet match by last eliminating L.A. Park.	
6	El Texano Jr.	1	October 7, 2012	San Luis Potosí, San Luis Potosí, Mexico	Won a 13-man gauntlet match by last eliminating El Mesías. His win was later nullified.	
7	La Parka	1	October 18, 2013	Puebla, Puebla, Mexico	Defeated Chessman, El Hijo del Fantasma, and Fénix in a four-way elimination match.	
8	Myzteziz	1	October 12, 2014	San Luis Potosí, San Luis Potosí, Mexico	Won an eight-man lumberjack match.	
9	Taurus	1	October 4, 2015	San Luis Potosí, San Luis Potosí, Mexico	Won a ten-man battle royal by last eliminating La Parka.	
10	Pimpinela Escarlata	1	October 2, 2016	Monterrey, Mexico	Won a 12-man battle royal.	
11	El Hijo del Fantasma	1	October 1, 2017	San Luis Potosí, San Luis Potosí, Mexico	Won a 14-man battle royal to win the AAA Latin American Championship.	
12	Pagano	1	October 28, 2018	Puebla, Puebla, Mexico	Won a 10-man battle royal by last eliminating El Hijo del Fantasma.	
13	El Hijo del Vikingo	1	October 19, 2019	Orizaba, Veracruz, Mexico	Won an 11-man battle royal by last eliminating Taurus.	
14	Pimpinela Escarlata	2	October 9, 2021	Orizaba, Veracruz, Mexico	Won a nine-man battle royal by last eliminating Mamba.	
15	Chik Tormenta	1	October 1, 2023	Guadalajara, Jalisco, Mexico	Defeated Maravilla in the tournament final.	
16	Chik Tormenta	2	October 6, 2024	Zapopan, Jalisco, Mexico	Won a nine-man battle royal by last eliminating Mini Vikingo.	

== Antonio Peña Memorial Shows ==
The Copa Antonio Peña was one of the featured events on the annual Antonio Peña Memorial Show (Homenaje a Antonio Peña in Spanish), which has been held since 2007 around the anniversary of Peña's death. In 2011, the first two Memorial Shows were retrospectively renamed Héroes Inmortales I and Héroes Inmortales II. Unlike previous years, the Copa Antonio Peña was not held during Héroes Inmortales XVII in 2025.

Event	Date	Location	Venue	Main event
Antonio Peña Memorial Show (2007)	October 7, 2007	Naucalpan, Mexico	Toreo de Cuatro Caminos	Domo de la Muerte match between Abismo Negro, Electroshock and El Zorro against Chessman, Cibernético and El Intocable
Antonio Peña Memorial Show (2008)	October 24, 2008	Naucalpan, Mexico	Estadio Universitario Beto Ávila	Steel cage elimination match between "Team AAA" and La Legión Extranjera
Héroes Inmortales III	September 26, 2009	Naucalpan, Mexico	Arena Monterrey	Dr. Wagner Jr. defending the AAA Mega Championship against El Mesías.
Héroes Inmortales IV	October 1, 2010	Ciudad Madero, Tamaulipas, Mexico	Centro de Convenciones	Steel cage elimination match between "Team AAA" and La Sociedad.
Héroes Inmortales (2011)	October 9, 2011	Monterrey, Nuevo León, Mexico	Arena Monterrey	Steel cage elimination Masks vs. Hairs match between Los Perros del Mal (Damián 666, Halloween and Nicho el Millonario) and Los Psycho Circus (Monster Clown, Murder Clown and Psycho Clown).
Héroes Inmortales (2012)	October 8, 2012	San Luis Potosí, San Luis Potosí, Mexico	Centro de Espectáculos de San Luis Potosí	Domo de la Muerte Hairs vs. Hairs match between Jack Evans, La Secta Bizarra Cibernetica (Cibernético, Dark Cuervo and Dark Ozz) and Los Perros del Mal (Halloween, El Hijo del Perro Aguayo, Psicosis and Teddy Hart).
Héroes Inmortales VII	October 18, 2013	Puebla, Puebla, Mexico	Gimnasio Miguel Hidalgo	Chessman vs. Fénix vs. El Hijo del Fantasma vs. La Parka for the Copa Antonio Peña.
Héroes Inmortales VIII	October 12, 2014	San Luis Potosí, San Luis Potosí, Mexico	Domo San Luis	El Mesías and El Patrón Alberto vs. El Hijo del Perro Aguayo and El Texano Jr.
Héroes Inmortales IX	October 4, 2015	San Luis Potosí, San Luis Potosí, Mexico	Domo San Luis	El Patrón Alberto vs. Johnny Mundo for the AAA Mega Championship
Héroes Inmortales X	October 2, 2016	Monterrey, Nuevo León, Mexico	Arena Monterrey	Johnny Mundo vs. Garza Jr. for the AAA Latin American Championship
Héroes Inmortales XI	October 1, 2017	San Luis Potosí, San Luis Potosí, Mexico	Domo San Luis	Joe Líder vs. El Mesías vs. Pagano in a Death match
Héroes Inmortales XII	October 28, 2018	Puebla, Puebla, Mexico	Gimnasio Miguel Hidalgo	Rey Wagner vs. Jeff Jarrett in a Hair vs. Hair Lucha de Apuestas
Héroes Inmortales XIII	October 19, 2019	Orizaba, Veracruz, Mexico	Coliseo "La Concordia"	Averno and Rey Wagner vs. Pentagón Jr. and Texano Jr. vs. Chessman and Pagano vs. Psycho Clown and Rey Escorpión in a Steel Cage Match
Héroes Inmortales XIV	October 9, 2021	Orizaba, Veracruz, Mexico	Coliseo "La Concordia"	Steel cage elimination match between Los Psycho Circus (Psycho Clown, Monster Clown, and Murder Clown) vs. La Empresa (Puma King, Sam Adonis, and DMT Azul)
Héroes Inmortales XV	October 1, 2023	Zapopan, Jalisco, Mexico	Auditorio Benito Juárez	Team USA (QT Marshall and Sam Adonis) vs. Team Mexico (Octagón and Alberto El Patrón)
Héroes Inmortales XVI	October 6, 2024	Zapopan, Jalisco, Mexico	Auditorio Benito Juárez	Alberto El Patrón (c) vs. Laredo Kid for the AAA Mega Championship
Héroes Inmortales XVII	October 25, 2025	Mexico City, Mexico	Gimnasio Olímpico Juan de la Barrera	Dominik Mysterio (c) vs. Dragon Lee for the AAA Mega Championship
Héroes Inmortales (2026)	October 24, 2026 (Airing October 24 – November 7)	Mexico City, Mexico	Gimnasio Olímpico Juan de la Barrera	Week 1 (October 24): El Grande Americano (c) vs. Dominik Mysterio for the AAA Mega Championship
Héroes Inmortales (2026)	October 24, 2026 (Airing October 24 – November 7)	Mexico City, Mexico	Gimnasio Olímpico Juan de la Barrera	Week 2 (October 31):
Héroes Inmortales (2026)	October 24, 2026 (Airing October 24 – November 7)	Mexico City, Mexico	Gimnasio Olímpico Juan de la Barrera	Week 3 (November 7):
