= Héroes Inmortales IX =

2015 Lucha Libre AAA World Wide event

- Official logo of Héroes Inmortales IX depicting AAA founder Antonio Peña
- Promotion: Lucha Libre AAA World Wide
- Date: October 4, 2015
- City: San Luis Potosí, San Luis Potosí, Mexico
- Venue: Domo San Luis
- Attendance: 10,000

Event chronology
← Previous; Triplemanía XXIII	Next → Guerra de Titanes

Antonio Peña Memorial Shows chronology
← Previous; VIII	Next → X

Héroes Inmortales IX (Spanish for "Immortal Heroes Nine") was a professional wrestling pay-per-view (PPV) event produced by the Mexican professional wrestling promotion Lucha Libre AAA World Wide (AAA). The event, which commemorated the ninth anniversary of the death of AAA founder Antonio Peña, took place on October 4, 2015, at Domo San Luis in San Luis Potosí, San Luis Potosí, Mexico. The six match show was main evented by El Patrón Alberto defending the AAA Mega Championship against Johnny Mundo and also featured the 2015 Copa Antonio Peña, a match for the AAA World Tag Team Championship and the AAA Reina de Reinas Championship.

== Production ==
=== Background ===
On October 5, 2006 founder of the Mexican professional wrestling, company Lucha Libre AAA World Wide (AAA, or Triple A) Antonio Peña died from a heart attack. The following year, on October 7, 2007, Peña's brother-in-law Jorge Roldan who had succeeded Peña as head of AAA held a show in honor of Peña's memory, the first ever "Antonio Peña Memorial Show" (Homenaje a Antonio Peña in Spanish). AAA made the tribute to Peña into a major annual event that would normally take place in October of each year, renaming the show series Héroes Inmortales (Spanish for "Immortal Heroes"), retroactively rebranding the 2007 and 2008 event as Héroes Inmortales I and Héroes Inmortales II. As part of their annual tradition AAA holds a Copa Antonio Peña ("Antonio Peña Cup") tournament with various wrestlers from AAA or other promotions competing for the trophy. The tournament is normally either a gauntlet match or a multi-man torneo cibernetico elimination match. Outside of the actual Copa Antonio Peña trophy the winner is not guaranteed any other "prizes" as a result of winning, although several Copa Antonio Peña winners did go on to challenge for the AAA Mega Championship. The 2015 show was the ninth show the Héroes Inmortales series of shows.

=== Storylines ===
The Héroes Inmortales show will feature six professional wrestling matches with different wrestlers involved in pre-existing, scripted feuds, plots, and storylines. Wrestlers are portrayed as either heels (referred to as rudos in Mexico, those that portray the "bad guys") or faces (técnicos in Mexico, the "good guy" characters) as they follow a series of tension-building events, which culminate in a wrestling match or series of matches.

== Results ==
No.	Results	Stipulations	Times
1	Taya (c) defeated Goya Kong, La Hiedra, Lady Maravilla and Lady Shani	Five-way match for the AAA Reina de Reinas Championship	10:14
2	Los Güeros del Cielo (Angélico and Jack Evans) defeated Pentagón Jr. and Joe Líder (c) and Daga and Steve Pain	Three-way tag team match for the AAA World Tag Team Championship	14:04
3	Brian Cage and El Mesías defeated Drago and Fénix	Tag team match	13:27
4	Taurus defeated Cibernético, La Parka, Blue Demon Jr., Averno, Hijo de Pirata Morgan, Electroshock, Aero Star and Chessman	2015 Copa Antonio Peña tournament	12:10
5	Rey Mysterio Jr., Psycho Clown and Garza Jr. defeated Myzteziz, El Texano Jr. and El Hijo del Fantasma	Six-man tag team match	18:31
6	El Patrón Alberto (c) (with Psycho Clown) defeated Johnny Mundo (with Brian Cage)	Singles match for the AAA Mega Championship	14:00
(c) / – the champion(s) heading into the match
