= Chik Tormenta =

Mexican professional wrestler

Personal information
- Born: Cristina Azpeitia Ramírez; August 29, 1984 (age 42) Guadalajara, Jalisco, Mexico

Professional wrestling career
- Ring name(s): Chik Tormenta; Chika Tormenta; Chica Tormenta; Tormenta
- Billed height: 1.70 m (5 ft 7 in)
- Billed weight: 72 kg (159 lb)
- Trained by: Roberto Paz; Flash; El Mexicano; Gran Apache
- Debut: September 30, 2006

Cristina Azpeitia Ramírez (born August 29, 1984), known under the ring name Chik Tormenta, is a Mexican professional wrestler who is primarily known for her work for Mexican promotion Lucha Libre AAA Worldwide where she is a former AAA World Mixed Tag Team Champion. Until 2022, Tormenta's real name was not a matter of public record, as is often the case with masked wrestlers in Mexico where their private lives are kept a secret from the wrestling fans.

== Professional wrestling career ==
=== Independent circuit (2011–present) ===
Tormenta made her debut on the Desastre Total Ultraviolento (DTU) where she defeated La Pantera.

On March 17, Tormenta defeated Keyra, Lady Shani and La Hiedra in a four-way match to win the AULL Women's Championship.

On October 9, 2019, Tormenta announced on her Facebook account that she was retiring indefinitely from professional wrestling due to her pregnancy, and would vacate all championships that she held.

=== Lucha Libre AAA Worldwide (2018–2026) ===
On July 13, 2018, Tormenta made her debut for Lucha Libre AAA Worldwide (AAA), one of Mexico's largest wrestling promotions. In her first AAA match she teamed up with Keyra and Arez, where defeated to Dragon Bane, Lady Maravilla and Star Fire. On August 2, Tormenta teaming with La Parka Negra, where defeated to Aero Star and Vanilla. Tormenta made a special appearance on the September 13, 2018 edition of Impact Wrestling Xplosion, which was taped September 13–14, 2018 at Mexico City's Frontón México Entertainment Center, she teamed with Arez and Latigo was defeated by Aramís and Dragon Bane and Star Fire.

On December 25, 2018, teaming with Demus and Toxin as representative of Liga Elite, winning to Team AAA (Chicano, Vanilla and Villano III Jr.). On March 16, 2019, at Rey de Reyes show, Tormenta competed in a Four-way match for the AAA Reina de Reinas Championship against Keira, La Hiedra and Lady Shani, which was won by Shani.

On August 30, 2019, Tormenta made her debut for Impact Wrestling as part of the promotion's partnership with AAA teaming with Jordynne Grace and Rosemary where they defeated Kiera Hogan, Madison Rayne and Vanilla.

On October 11, 2021, Tormenta and Arez won the AAA World Mixed Tag Team Championship. They lost the titles to Tay Conti and Sammy Guevara in a four-way match at Triplemanía XXX: Monterrey on April 30, 2022. On June 18, at Triplemanía XXX: Tijuana, Flammer won the Lucha de Apuestas match and, as a result, Tormenta was forced to unmask and reveal her real name.

In 2025, American promotion WWE acquired AAA. Tormenta made her WWE debut on May 25, 2025, at NXT Battleground, where Dalys and herself were seated at ringside during the NXT Women's Championship match between reigning champion Stephanie Vaquer and Jordynne Grace as part of the partnership between NXT and AAA after WWE had acquired AAA in April 2025. At the WWE and AAA event Worlds Collide on June 7, Tormenta teamed with Dalys in a tag team match where they lost to Vaquer and Lola Vice. In July 2026, Tormenta announced her exit from AAA and WWE.

== Championships and accomplishments ==
- Lucha Libre AAA Worldwide
  - AAA World Mixed Tag Team Championship (1 time) – with Arez
  - Copa Antonio Peña (2023)
- Pro Wrestling Illustrated
  - Ranked No. 146 of the top 150 female wrestlers in the PWI Women's 150 in 2021

== Luchas de Apuestas record ==
Winner (wager)	Loser (wager)	Location	Event	Date	Notes
Chik Tormenta (hair)	Mystique (hair)	Benbrook, Texas	Noche de Apuestas - Martinez Entertainment	July 16, 2015	
Flammer (mask)	Chik Tormenta (mask)	Tijuana	Triplemanía XXX: Tijuana	June 18, 2022	
