= El Fiscal =

2015 Argentine detective fiction novel

- Author: R. S. Pratt
- Language: Spanish
- Subject: Death of Alberto Nisman
- Genre: Detective novel
- Publisher: Emece
- Publication place: Argentina

El Fiscal (Spanish: The prosecutor) is a 2013 detective fiction novel from Argentina, freely based on the death of Alberto Nisman.

== Premise ==
As of April 2015, the real case was still open, and it was unknown if it was a suicide or a murder. The novel combines both premises, and have the titular character commit suicide before the killers could get to him. The novel uses fictional characters, which are actually unsubtle references to Argentine politicians. The prosecutor Lerman is Nisman, and the president Cristina Hernández de Larcher, the spy Trusso and the owner of the gun Castagnino are references to Cristina Fernández de Kirchner, Stiuso and Lagomarsino.

== Author ==
The book was published by Emece, and the author is R. S. Pratt. Emece told that the name is actually the pseudonym of a known Argentine writer, whose real identity has not been disclosed. The newspaper Infobae made an interview by email. Pratt commented that the book is based only in the public information of the case available at the press, and that he did not get in contact with the relatives of Nisman. He also refused to disclose his identity. Ignacio Iraola, directo of the publisher Planeta, said in an interview with the newspaper "Miradas al Sur" that the creation of the book was decided after three days of the death of Nisman, and the author wrote it in just a month.

Some suspected authors are Jorge Fernández Díaz, Marcelo Birmajer, Jorge Asís, Juan Sasturain, Guillermo Saccomano and Ernesto Mallo. The publisher clarified that it is not Díaz. Birmajer was outraged by the attribution, and Mallo wrote in his Facebook account that, regarding the use of pseudonyms, "I have never done that, and I will not do it again" [sic].
