= Héroes Inmortales III =

2009 Lucha Libre AAA World Wide event

- Official poster for the show
- Promotion: AAA
- Date: September 26, 2009
- City: Monterrey, Mexico
- Venue: Arena Monterrey
- Attendance: 11,000
- Tagline(s): Tercer homenaje luctuoso a don Antonio Peña (Third memorial of Mr. Antonio Peña)

Event chronology
| ← Previous; Verano de Escándalo | Next → Guerra de Titanes |

Héroes Inmortales Shows chronology
| ← Previous; II | Next → IV |

Héroes Inmortales III: Homenaje a Don Antonio Peña (Spanish for "Immortal Heroes III: Tribute to Antonio Peña) was a professional wrestling major show event produced by AAA that took place on September 26, 2009 in Arena Monterrey, Monterrey, Mexico, commemorating the third anniversary of the death of AAA founder Antonio Peña. The main event of the show was a AAA Mega Championship title defense where then reigning champion Dr. Wagner, Jr. defended the championship against challenger El Mesías. The other featured match on the show was the third annual Copa Antonio Peña, a 12-man Battle Royal. The show was originally called just Homenaje a Antonio Peña but was renamed to Héroes Inmortales in the weeks leading up to the event.

== Production ==
=== Background ===
On October 5, 2006 founder of the Mexican professional wrestling, company AAA Antonio Peña died from a heart attack. The following year, on October 7, 2007, Peña's brother-in-law Jorge Roldan who had succeeded Peña as head of AAA held a show in honor of Peña's memory, the first ever Antonio Peña Memorial Show (Homenaje a Antonio Peña in Spanish). AAA made the tribute to Peña into a major annual event that would normally take place in October of each year, renaming the show series Héroes Inmortales (Spanish for "Immortal Heroes"), retroactively rebranding the 2007 and 2008 event as Héroes Inmortales I and Héroes Inmortales II. As part of their annual tradition AAA holds a Copa Antonio Peña ("Antonio Peña Cup") tournament with various wrestlers from AAA or other promotions competing for the trophy. The tournament is normally either a gauntlet match or a multi-man torneo cibernetico elimination match. Outside of the actual Copa Antonio Peña trophy the winner is not guaranteed any other "prizes" as a result of winning, although several Copa Antonio Peña winners did go on to challenge for the AAA Mega Championship. The 2009 show was the third show in the Héroes Inmortales series of shows.

=== Storylines ===
The Héroes Inmortales show featured seven professional wrestling matches with different wrestlers involved in pre-existing, scripted feuds, plots, and storylines. Wrestlers were portrayed as either heels (referred to as rudos in Mexico, those that portray the "bad guys") or faces (técnicos in Mexico, the "good guy" characters) as they followed a series of tension-building events, which culminated in a wrestling match or series of matches.

The main event was originally scheduled to be a Luchas de Apuestas, hair vs. hair match between Charly Manson and Chessman, playing off their long running storyline. In the week leading up to the event Manson announced that he had left AAA and would not be participating in the match. On the Mexican wrestling program Tercera Caída Manson stated that he left AAA because he was not given enough dates to earn a living and unlike the non-Mexican AAA workers he did not have a guaranteed contract. He also stated that he was not offered enough money to lose to Chessman, revealing that the original ending to Manson vs. Chessman was for Chessman to win. On September 24, 2009, AAA, through Marisela Peña and Joaquín Roldan, confirmed that Charly Manson had indeed left AAA but that Chessman was still booked in an Apuesta match for the show.

At Triplemanía XVII Dr. Wagner, Jr. won the AAA Mega Championship from El Mesías. At the following event, the 2009 Verano de Escándalo, Dr. Wagner, Jr. successfully defended the title against El Mesías and Cibernético. Following a match on the August 30, 2009 TV taping El Mesías challenged Dr. Wagner, Jr. for another title match, which was accepted by the champion. The type of match the two will face off in has yet to be determined.

At AAA's previous major show Alex Koslov won the AAA Cruiserweight Championship from Extreme Tiger in a match that also included Rocky Romero, Jack Evans and Teddy Hart. At the subsequent TV taping on August 30, 2009, AAA held a cage match where the first person to escape was named the number one contender and the last person left in the ring was forced to leave AAA. Extreme Tiger was the first person out of the cage and thus the number one contender, but the last person in the cage was Koslov, the reigning champion. After the match Koslov was fired by Joaquin Roldan. Whether Koslov's firing is a storyline or not remains to be seen. Following the termination AAA announced that the Cruiserweight title was vacated and that Extreme Tiger, Rocky Romero, Jack Evans, Teddy Hart and Sugi San would face off at the Memorial show to determine who would become the new Cruiserweight champion.

On September 9, 2009, the full card was announced including a 13-man gauntlet for the Copa Antonio Peña and a Lucha o Oscuras, a glow in the dark match where all the competitors wear fluorescent colored outfits and wrestle under a blacklight that is traditionally part of the Antonio Peña Memorials.

== Event ==
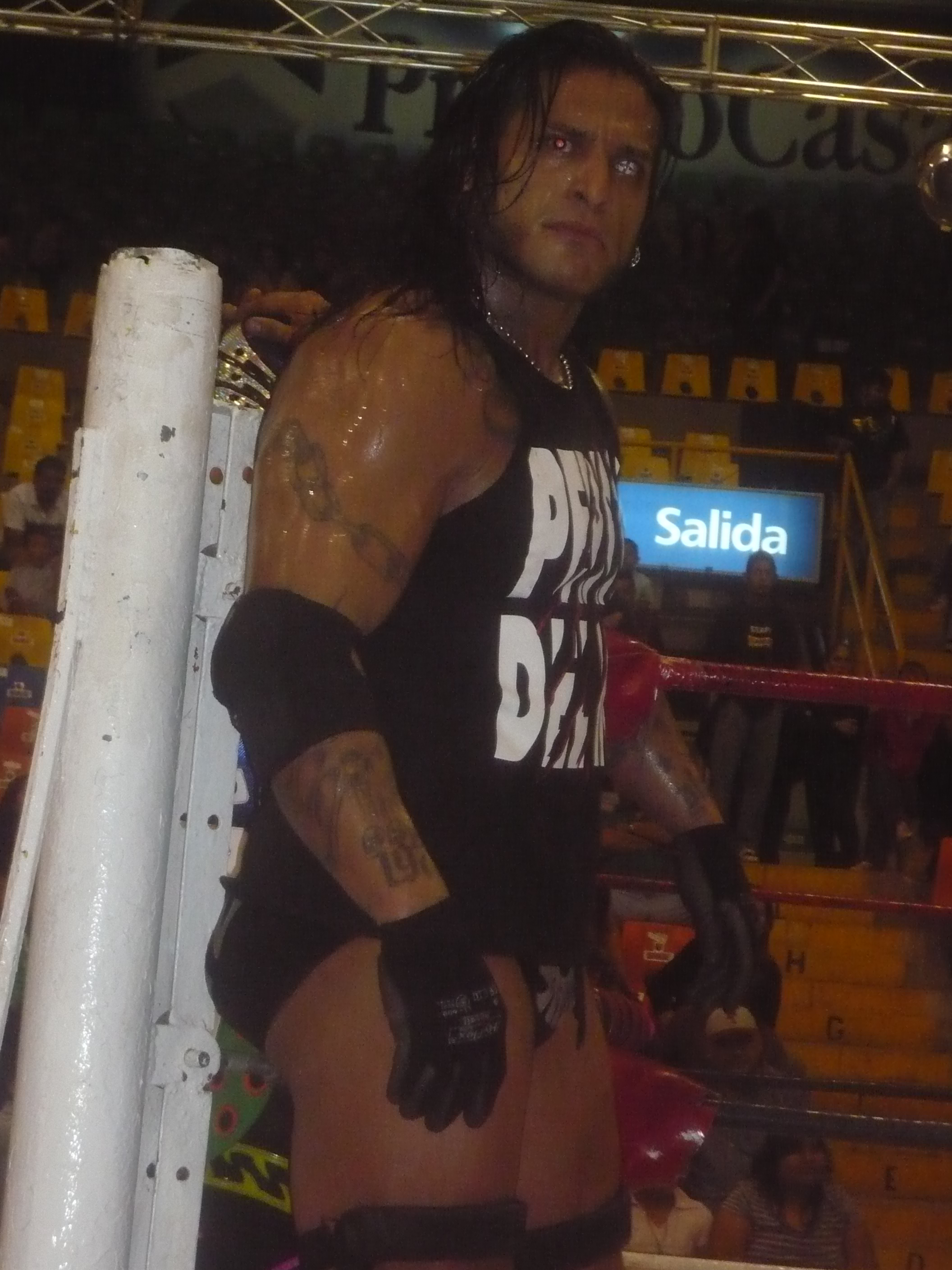
Cibernético: winner of the 2009 Copa Antonio Peña

On the night of the show it was revealed that despite legal threats from AAA's management Charly Manson did not show for the scheduled match and AAA announced that he would be replaced. La Parka, Cibernético, El Zorro and an unannounced Konan Big all made appearances in the arena to tease that they would be the replacement until Electroshock came to the ring. He stated that he would take his brother's place in the match against Chessman. Electoshock lost due to interference from Konnan, Jennifer Blake and Lorelei Lee and had his hair shaved off. After the match La Parka came out and got the referee, Hijo de Tirantes hair shaved off as well for missing the interference.

Konan Big, already revealed as being in the building, was the final entrant in the Copa Antonio Peña. Originally Latin Lover was supposed to be the final surprise entrant, but he no-showed the event and was therefore replaced by Konan Big. Due to taking part in an earlier match, Electroshock was taken off the match, which now had 12 participants. Unlike the previous years, this year the Copa was a Battle Royal which Cibernético won, lastly eliminating Konan Big.

== Results ==
| No. | Results | Stipulations |
|---|---|---|
| 1 | Real Fuerza Aérea (Laredo Kid, Argenis and Atomic Boy) defeated Poder del Norte (Río Bravo, Tigre Cota, Tito Santana) | Lucha o Oscuras, "Glow in the dark"Six-man "Lucha Libre rules" tag team match |
| 2 | Extreme Tiger defeated Sugi San, Jack Evans, Rocky Romero and Teddy Hart | Five-way elimination match for the vacant AAA Cruiserweight Championship |
| 3 | Groon XXX, Joe Líder and Nicho el Millonario defeated Gronda II, El Elegido and Decnnis | Hardcore Steel Cage match |
| 4 | Sexy Star defeated Faby Apache (c) | "Bull Terrier" match for the AAA Reina de Reinas Championship |
| 5 | Chessman defeated Electroshock | Lucha de Apuestas, hair vs. hair match |
| 6 | Cibernético won the Copa Antonio Peña defeating La Parka, Octagón, Silver King, Alan Stone, El Zorro, Último Gladiador, Kenzo Suzuki, Marco Corleone, Pimpinela Escarlata, Dark Ozz and Konan Big | 12-man battle royal |
| 7 | Dr. Wagner, Jr. (c) defeated El Mesías | Singles match for the AAA Mega Championship |
(c) / – the champion(s) heading into the match

=== Copa Antonio Peña ===
A new entrant came out every 60 seconds.

| Draw | Entrant | Order | Eliminated by | Time |
|---|---|---|---|---|
| 1 | Dark Ozz | 1 | Pimpinela Escarlata | 4:48 |
| 2 | Marco Corleone | 7 | Cibernético | 16:29 |
| 3 | Kenzo Suzuki | 2 | Himself | 6:02 |
| 4 | Ultimo Gladiador | 4 | Himself | 8:52 |
| 5 | Alan Stone | 10 | Himself | 15:31 |
| 6 | Pimpinela Escarlata | 3 | Himself | 5:23 |
| 7 | Silver King | 6 | Octagón | 11:07 |
| 8 | Octagón | 9 | Himself | 11:28 |
| 9 | El Zorro | 8 | Himself | 10:13 |
| 10 | Cibernético | — | Winner | 11:44 |
| 11 | La Parka | 5 | Himself | 6:19 |
| 12 | Konan Big | 11 | Himself | 9:44 |
