= Antonio Peña Memorial Show (2007) =

2007 Lucha Libre AAA World Wide event

- Promotion: Asistencia Asesoría y Administración
- Date: October 7, 2007
- City: Naucalpan, Mexico
- Venue: Toreo de Cuatro Caminos
- Attendance: 14,000

Event chronology
← Previous; Verano de Escándalo	Next → Guerra de Titanes

Antonio Peña Memorial Shows chronology
← Previous; First	Next → 2008

The 2007 Antonio Peña Memorial Show (Homenaje a Antonio Peña in Spanish) was the first show to honor the deceased Antonio Peña, owner and creator of the Mexican Lucha Libre, or professional wrestling, company Asistencia Asesoría y Administración (AAA). The show was held approximately one year after Peña died of a heart attack. The main focus of the show was the first ever Copa Antonio Peña which was won by Charly Manson as he survived a 12-man gauntlet match eliminating Alan Stone, Konnan and Scott Hall to win the Copa. Also on the show was a Domo De La Muerte cage match (Spanish for "Dome of Death") that saw Chessman come out as the loser in the match and thus had to have his hair shaved off. The undercard featured four additional matches. The show also saw the surprise return of Nicho El Millonario and Electroshock and the surprise appearance of Scott Hall. The event has since been retrospectively renamed Héroes Inmortales I ("Immortal Heroes I").

== Production ==
=== Background ===
On October 5, 2006 founder of the Mexican professional wrestling, company Asistencia Asesoría y Administración (AAA, or Triple A; Spanish for "Assistance, Consulting, and Administration") Antonio Peña died from a heart attack. The following year, on October 7, 2007, Peña's brother-in-law Jorge Roldan who had succeeded Peña as head of AAA held a show in honor of Peña's memory, the first ever Antonio Peña Memorial Show (Homenaje a Antonio Peña in Spanish). AAA made the tribute to Peña into a major annual event that would normally take place in October of each year, renaming the show series Héroes Inmortales (Spanish for "Immortal Heroes"), retroactively rebranding the 2007 and 2008 event as Héroes Inmortales I and Héroes Inmortales II. As part of their annual tradition AAA holds a Copa Antonio Peña ("Antonio Peña Cup") tournament with various wrestlers from AAA or other promotions competing for the trophy. The tournament is normally either a gauntlet match or a multi-man torneo cibernetico elimination match. Outside of the actual Copa Antonio Peña trophy the winner is not guaranteed any other "prizes" as a result of winning, although several Copa Antonio Peña winners did go on to challenge for the AAA Mega Championship. The 2007 show was the first show in what would become known as the Héroes Inmortales shows.

=== Storylines ===
The Antonio Peña Memorial Show featured six professional wrestling matches with different wrestlers involved in pre-existing, scripted feuds, plots, and storylines. Wrestlers were portrayed as either heels (referred to as rudos in Mexico, those that portray the "bad guys") or faces (técnicos in Mexico, the "good guy" characters) as they followed a series of tension-building events, which culminated in a wrestling match or series of matches.

=== Undercard matches ===
The first match of the Antonio Peña Memorial Show was a six-man Mini-Estrella match that saw the tecnico team of Mascarita Divina, Octagóncito and La Parkita defeat the rudo team Los Mini Vipers (Mini Charly Manson, Mini Chessman and Mini Histeria) in 17:48. The second match on the undercard was a "AAA Special" Relevos Atómicos de locura match (Spanish for "Eight-man madness match") that featured two teams of four: a male wrestler, a female wrestler, an Exotico wrestler and a Mini-Estrella. Billy Boy teamed with his ex-wife Faby Apache, Cassandro and Mini Abismo Negro to defeat the makeshift team of Super Fly, Cinthia Moreno, Pimpinela Escarlata and Mascarita Sagrada when Cassandro pinned Super Fly following a Rana headscissors. After the match a new Exotico group called Las Night Queens, Polvo de Estrellas, Yuriko, Nygma and Jesse, attacking both Casandro and Pimpinela Escarlata.

The third match of the night featured the rudo group Los Viper’s Revolution (Histeria, Mr. Niebla and Psicosis II) taking on and beating a team of "AAA Loyalists" consisting of El Alebrije, El Elegido and Octagón. Histeria and Psicosis II both pinned El Elegido at the same time, gaining the win for their team. In the fourth match of the night Nicho el Millonario made his surprise return to AAA after years of absence, teaming up with Extreme Tiger and Halloween to reform La Familia de Tijuana, a stable last seen in Consejo Mundial de Lucha Libre. La Familia defeated the Mexican Powers (Crazy Boy, Joe Líder and Juventud Guerrera) in a traditional Six-man "Lucha Libre rules" tag team match when Nicho landed a high flying move off the top rope on Juventud Guerrera.

=== Main event matches ===
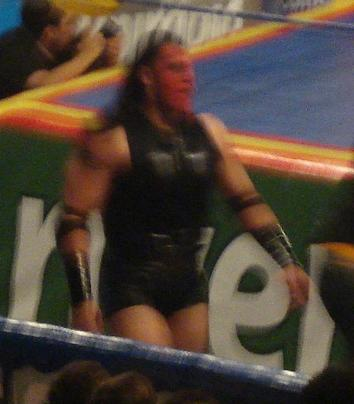
Chessman, lost his hair in the main event

The first of the two main events on the show was the first ever Copa Antonio Peña, a 12-man gauntlet match, where two wrestlers begin in the ring and each time a wrestler is defeated he is replaced by a new wrestler until all 12 wrestlers have entered the match. The focus of the event was the storyline between La Legión Extranjera ("The Foreign Legion" in Spanish) and the "AAA Loyalists". The match started out with La Legión member X-Pac facing and defeating Brazo de Plata in short order. AAA Loyalist Mascara Divina was the next competitor, eliminating X-Pac after approximately five minutes of action. Next Mascara Divina faced Legiónaire Kenzo Suzuki who made short work of Divina, eliminating him after only a couple of minutes of wrestling. Next Kenzo Suzuki eliminated AAA Icon La Parka, taking advantage of La Parka's shoulder injury. AAA wrestler Laredo Kid surprisingly pinned Suzuki next, giving the young wrestlers one of his biggest wins to date. Unfortunately Laredo Kid suffered a serious leg injury while executing a move on Ron Killings and was eliminated from the match. The injury kept Laredo Kid out of the ring for months. The seventh competitor was Alan Stone, rolling up Ron Killings to eliminate him, only to face his main storyline rival Scorpio, Jr. as the next entrant. Scorpio, Jr. soon got help from his Los Guapos team mates Zumbido and Decnis but Alan Stone still managed to pin Scorpio, Jr. After the loss all three Guapos' attacked Alan Stone, drawing blood. The next competitor was Charly Manson, a member of the very popular Los Hell Brothers faction, who pinned Alan Stone after nine minutes of wrestling. The next competitor was the surprise appearance of Scott Hall, brought in by La Legión as their secret weapon. Konnan, the leader of La Legión made his surprise return as well, recovered from a kidney operation he accompanied Scott Hall to ringside. Manson overcame interference from Konnan, X-Pac and Ron Killings to pin Scott Hall. Just as Charly Manson thought he had won the gauntlet match Konnan attacked him from behind, revealing that he was the final competitor. In the end La Parka came to the ring, thwarting La Legión's plans, helping Charly Manson pin Konnan and win the first Copa Antonio Peña. Following the match Charly Manson was presented with a medal, bearing the image of Antonio Peña, by Joaquin Roldan, Peña's successor as AAA booker.

The second main event, and last match of the evening was a Domo De La Muerte cage match where the last man in the ring would be forced to have his hair shaved off. The tecnico team saw Los Hell Brothers (Chessman and Cibernético) team up with and El Intocable who replaced Latin Lover in the match. La Legión Extranjera came to the ring next, scheduled to compete were AAA Mega Champion El Mesías, Abismo Negro and El Zorro. Before the match began El Mesías announced that he was injured and that La Legión had brought someone in to replace him in the match and then introduced the returning Electroshock as his replacement. El Zorro was the first to escape the cage, followed by Cibernético less than a minute later. Following Cibernético's escape El Zorro climbed back inside the cage to give his side a three on two advantage against Intocable and Chessman. With the numbers to their advantage La Legión were able to be so dominant that both Electroshock and Abismo Negro were able to escape pretty close together. Intocable escaped next as Zorro was fighting with Chessman. After 18 minutes of action El Zorro managed to climb up the cage and out, leaving Chessman the last man in the ring.

== Results ==
No.	Results	Stipulations	Times
1	Mascarita Divina, Octagóncito and La Parkita defeated Los Mini Vipers (Mini Charly Manson, Mini Chessman and Mini Histeria)	Six-man "Lucha Libre rules" tag team match	17:48
2	Billy Boy, Faby Apache, Cassandro and Mini Abismo Negro defeated Super Fly, Cinthia Moreno, Pimpinela Escarlata and Mascarita Sagrada – (Cassandro pinned Super Fly)	Relevos Atómicos Incredibales match	18:20
3	Los Viper’s Revolution (Histeria, Mr. Niebla and Psicosis II) defeated El Alebrije, El Elegido and Octagón – (Histeria and Psicosis pinned El Elegido.)	Six-man "Lucha Libre rules" tag team match	11:53
4	La Familia de Tijuana (Extreme Tiger, Halloween and Nicho el Millonario) defeated the Mexican Powers (Crazy Boy, Joe Líder and Juventud Guerrera) – (Nicho pinned Juventud Guerra)	Six-man "Lucha Libre rules" tag team match	14:44
5	Charly Manson won the Copa Antonio Peña	10-man Copa Antonio Peña Gauntlet match	1:01:40
6	La Legión Extranjera (Abismo Negro, Electroshock and El Zorro) defeated Chessman, Cibernético and El Intocable	Domo De La Muerte cage match. Chessman was the last person in the cage. Order of escape, Cibernético, Electroshock, Abismo Negro, Intocable, El Zorro.	18:26

Copa Antonio Peña Order of elimination

1. Brazo de Plata (by X-Pac) - 03:14
2. X-Pac (by Mascara Divina) - 08:08
3. Mascara Divina (by Kenzo Suzuki) - 11:20
4. La Parka (by Kenzo Suzuki) - 21:00
5. Kenzo Suzuki (by Laredo Kid) - 25:06
6. Laredo Kid (by Ron Killings) - 29:47
7. Ron Killings (by Alan Stone) - 33:12
8. Scorpio, Jr. (by Alan Stone) - 39:10
9. Alan Stone (by Charly Manson) - 44:45
10. Scott Hall (by Charly Manson) - 53:30
11. Konnan (by Charly Manson) - 1:01:40
