= Guerra de Titanes (2009) =

2009 Lucha Libre AAA World Wide event

Guerra de Titanes 2009
- Official poster for the show
- Promotion: AAA
- Date: December 11, 2009
- City: Ciudad Madero, Tamaulipas, Mexico
- Venue: El Centro de Convenciones
- Attendance: 10,345

Pay-per-view chronology
← Previous; Heroes Inmortales III	Next → Rey de Reyes

Guerra de Titanes chronology
← Previous; 2008	Next → 2010

Guerra de Titanes (2009) ("War of the Titans") was the thirteenth annual Guerra de Titanes professional wrestling show promoted by AAA since 1997. The show took place on December 11, 2009 in the Ciudad Madero, Tamaulipas Convention center, a site that AAA has used for many of their major shows. Guerra de Titanes is AAA's "End of year" show and the fifth of their "big shows" they hold every year. The Main Event saw Dr. Wagner Jr. defend the AAA Mega Championship against El Mesias in a Domo De La Muerte cage match. The show also featured two AAA championship matches as Nicho el Millonario and Joe Líder defended the AAA World Tag Team Championship and Mini Charly Manson defended the AAA World Mini-Estrella Championship. Furthermore a "Mask vs. Hair", Lucha de Apuesta match between Faby Apache and Sexy Star took place as well. Finally the show featured a Six-man "Lucha Libre rules" tag team match and a four on four "AAA vs. La Legion Extranjera elimination match where the winner would receive a title match for the AAA Mega Championship as AAA's 2010 Rey de Reyes show.

== Production ==
=== Background ===
Starting in 1997 the Mexican professional wrestling, company AAA has held a major wrestling show late in the year, either November or December, called Guerra de Titanes ("War of the Titans"). The show often features championship matches or Lucha de Apuestas or bet matches where the competitors risked their wrestling mask or hair on the outcome of the match. In Lucha Libre the Lucha de Apuetas match is considered more prestigious than a championship match and a lot of the major shows feature one or more Apuesta matches. The Guerra de Titanes show is hosted by a new location each year, emanating from cities such as Madero, Chihuahua, Chihuahua, Mexico City, Guadalajara, Jalisco and more. The 2009 Guerra de Titanes show was the twelfth show in the series.

=== Storylines ===
The Guerra de Titanes show featured six professional wrestling matches with different wrestlers involved in pre-existing, scripted feuds, plots, and storylines. Wrestlers were portrayed as either heels (referred to as rudos in Mexico, those that portray the "bad guys") or faces (técnicos in Mexico, the "good guy" characters) as they followed a series of tension-building events, which culminated in a wrestling match or series of matches.

== Event ==
The 2009 Guerra de Titanes show started off with a tag team match before the television cameras began taping the main show, a so-called "Dark Match". The match saw the team of Lumino and Impulso take face the team of Disturbio Ledsema and Black Master. After 6 minutes and 12 seconds Lumino landed a 360 degree splash off the top rope onto Black Master and Impulso executed a slam off the top rope, slamming Disturbio Ledsema to the mat, allowing them to pin both men for the victory.

=== Preliminary matches ===
The official event started at 09:36 PM Local time as the cameras began taping the matches to be shown on AAA's weekly television shows at a later date. The opening match was a nine-man Battle Royal for the AAA World Mini-Estrella Championship, where all the competitors were a part of AAA's Mini-Estrella division. (Note: Wrestlers in the Mini-Estrella division are not necessarily dwarves as several short wrestlers work in the "Mini" division as well.) The match did not feature the traditional "Over the top rope" eliminations that are traditionally seen in Battle Royals but instead wrestlers were eliminated by pinfalls or submissions. The first wrestler eliminated was Mascarita Divina, who was accidentally injured by Mini Abismo Negro and had to be removed from the ring after just three minutes and four seconds. Within three minutes Mini Chessman, Mascarita Sagrada and La Parkita had been eliminated from the match. At 07:45 into the match Mini Abismo Negro pinned the reigning champion Mini Charly Manson, ensuring that there would be a new Mini-Estrella champion by the end of the match. With the eliminations of Mini Psicosis and Mini Histeria the match came down to Mini Abismo Negro and Octagoncito. Mini Abismo Negro won the match and the Championship in 17:19 when he pinned Octagoncito after a Powerbomb.

The second match of Guerra de Titanes was also the second title match of the evening as La Hermandad 187 (Spanish for "the Brotherhood of 187"; Nicho el Millonario and Joe Líder) defended the AAA World Tag Team Championship against the team of Marco Corleone and Jack Evans. During the match Corleone aggravated a pre-existing injury, forcing Jack Evans to wrestle the majority of the match. La Hermandad 187 were favored by rudo referee Hijo del Tirantes, allowing the team to use otherwise illegal tactics including using a metal folding chair as a foreign object. The finish came when La Hermandad slammed Jack Evans onto a metal chair and pinned him to retain the championship.

The third match featured two teams of three as La Wagnermaniacos (Silver King, Electroshock and Último Gladiador) faced off against the team of El Elegido, Pimpinela Escarlata and AAA Cruiserweight Champion Extreme Tiger. While Elegido, Escarlata and Extreme Tiger were not used to teaming on a regular basis they defeated Los Wagnermaniacos after 14:56 of wrestling when Pimpinela Escarlate pinned Silver King. Following the match Los Wagnermaniacos attacked the other team, taking the frustrations of the loss out on them.

=== Semi-main event matches ===
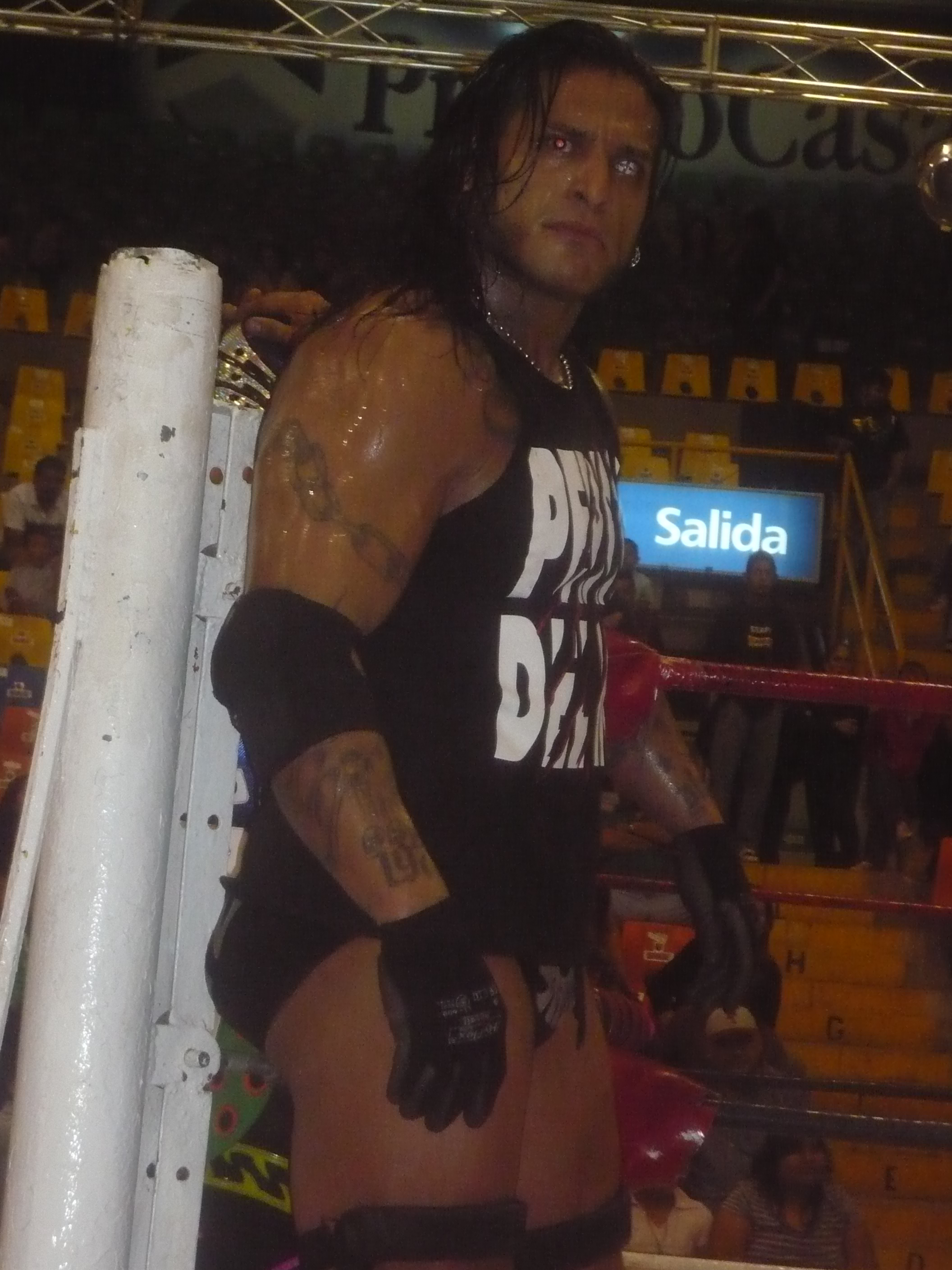
Cibernético who wrestled in an unsactioned Streetfight

The fourth match of the night saw a team representing AAA facing a team representing the main rudo faction La Legión Extranjera (The Foreign Legion) as La Parka, Latin Lover, Octagón and Rocky Romero took on the team of Chessman, El Zorro, Alex Koslov and Teddy Hart in an elimination match where the survivor would become the number one contender for the AAA Mega Championship. The early parts of the match saw frequent tags in and out, but no eliminations until 9 minutes and 59 seconds into the match when El Zorro eliminated Rocky Romero when he forced him to submit. Less than a minute later Latin Lover evened the sides when he pinned Alex Koslov with a quick roll-up pinfall. At the 11:42 mark Teddy Hart put La Legión up three to two when he pinned Octagón. A minute later La Parka evened the sides by pinning Hart after a dive off the ropes. Next La Parka pinned Chessman, leaving El Zorro in a two-on-one situation. 16 minutes and 30 seconds into the match El Zorro was able to eliminate La Parka after hitting him with a Kendo stick when the referee had his back turned. The final fall of the match saw Latin Lover pin El Zorro to earn the title match at the 2010 Rey de Reyes event.

Next on the card was a Lucha de Apuesta match, where Faby Apache put her hair on the line and Sexy Star put her mask on the line. As with the Tag Team match referee Hijo del Tirantes favored the Ruda (Sexy Star), allowing several wrestlers to interfere in the match without calling for a disqualification. La Legión members Jennifer Blake and Rain came to the ring and attacked Faby Apache, helping Sexy Star gain the victory. After the match Faby Apache's father Gran Apache came to the ring and cut his daughter's hair, ensuring that La Legión did not hurt his daughter. Traditionally the loser of a Lucha de Apuesta match has all the hair on their head shaved off, but in this case Gran Apache only cut off some of the hair before leaving the ring.

The final undercard match of the evening was an "unsanctioned" streetfight between Cibernético and the leader of La Legión Konnan. Since the match was billed as an unsanctioned match both wrestlers were allowed to use any weapons they wanted and could not be disqualified for interference. Konnan quickly took advantage of the lack of rules when La Legión member Alex Koslov came to his aid. Koslov climbed up the scaffolding and jumped off the lighting rig onto Cibernético. Konnan and Koslov were soon joined by Teddy Hart and then by La Hermandad 187 as they "massacred" Cibernético, beating him so severely that he bleed profusely. After the match it was revealed that Dorian Roldan had prevented anyone from coming to Cibernético's aid. After beating down Cibernético for 23:15 Konnan easily pinned Cibernético. Following the match La Parka finally made the save, helping Cibernético from the ring.

=== Main event ===
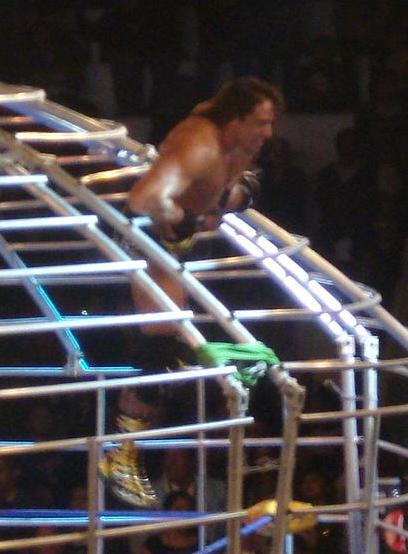
El Mesias leaving the Domo de la Muerte in the main event

The main event of Guerra de Titanes was Dr. Wagner Jr. defending the AAA Mega title against the former champion El Mesias in a Domo De La Muerte cage match. Before the match could start Dr. Wagner Jr. demanded that the match would be a "no disqualification" as well as the cage rules, which El Mesias agreed to. The two wrestlers fought in and on the cage, with several attempts at leaving the cage to win the match being foiled by the opponent. The two wrestled for 48 minutes and 34 seconds before El Mesias executed a Piledriver on Dr. Wagner Jr., a move that would have caused El Mesias to be disqualified if the rules had not been changed right before the match, pinning Dr. Wagner Jr. to regain the AAA Mega Championship.

== Aftermath ==
A few days after the show AAA announced that Mascarita Divina had fractured his tibia and fibula during the Mini-Estrella battle royal and would need "considerable time" to recover from the injury. In the days following Guerra de Titanes Electroshock challenged El Mesias for the championship, citing his 2009 Rey de Reyes tournament victory. The challenge was accepted by El Mesias, much to the dismay of Dr. Wagner Jr. who was looking for a rematch after Guerra de Titanes. At the 2010 Rey de Reyes Electroshock defeated El Mesias and Mr. Anderson to win the AAA Mega Championship. Latin Lover had earned a spot in the Rey de Reyes championship match but did not show up for the match. AAA subsequently severed all ties with Latin Lover. The war between Cibernético and Konnan continued into 2010 with Cibernético and Los Psycho Circus fighting against La Legión. Los Psycho Circus aided Cibernético at Rey de Reyes, ensuring that La Legión was unable to interfere in the match so that Cibernético could win.

== Results ==
No.	Results	Stipulations	Times
1^{D}	Lúmino and Impulso defeated Disturbio Ledsema and Black Master	Tag team match	06:12
2	Mini Abismo Negro defeated Mini Charly Manson (c), Mascarita Divina, Mini Histeria, Mascarita Sagrada, Mini Psicosis, La Parkita, Octagoncito, and Mini Chessman	Battle Royal for the AAA World Mini-Estrella Championship	17:19
3	La Hermandad 187 (Nicho el Millonario and Joe Líder) (c) defeated Jack Evans and Marco Corleone	Tag team match for the AAA World Tag Team Championship	11:07
4	El Elegido, Extreme Tiger, and Pimpinela Escarlata defeated Los Wagnermaniacos (Silver King, Electroshock, and Último Gladiador)	Six-man "Lucha Libre rules" tag team match	14:56
5	Latin Lover won a match that also included La Parka, Octagón and Rocky Romero, Chessman, El Zorro, Alex Koslov and Teddy Hart	Four vs. four elimination match for a title match at the 2010 Rey de Reyes show	18:08
6	Sexy Star defeated Faby Apache	Lucha de Apuesta, mask vs. hair match	15:39
7	Konnan defeated Cibernético	"Unsanctioned" street fight	23:12
8	El Mesías defeated Dr. Wagner Jr. (c)	Domo De La Muerte cage match for the AAA Mega Championship	48:34
(c) / – the champion(s) heading into the match; D / – this was a dark match

Order of elimination – Mini-Estrellas Battle Royal

No.	Eliminated	By	Time
1	Mascarita Divina	Injured	03:04
2	Mini Chessman	Mini Charly Manson	04:35
3	Mascarita Sagrada	Mini Abismo Negro	05:20
4	La Parkita	Mini Abismo Negro	06:02
5	Mini Charly Manson	Mini Abismo Negro	07:45
6	Mini Psicosis	Octagoncito	10:49
7	Mini Histeria	Octagoncito	12:12
8	Octagoncito	Mini Abismo Negro	17:19
9	Mini Abismo Negro	Winner	17:19

Order of elimination – "Team AAA" Vs La Legion elimination match

No.	Eliminated	By	Time
1	Rocky Romero	El Zorro	09:59
2	Alex Koslov	Latin Lover	10:43
3	Octagón	Teddy Hart	11:42
4	Teddy Hart	La Parka	12:56
5	Chessman	La Parka	14:16
6	La Parka	El Zorro	16:30
7	El Zorro	Latin Lover	18:08
8	Latin Lover	Winner	18:08
