= Triplemanía XVIII =

2010 Lucha Libre AAA World Wide event

- Promotional poster featuring L.A. Park
- Promotion: AAA
- Date: June 6, 2010
- City: Mexico City, Mexico
- Venue: Palacio de los Deportes
- Tagline(s): En la Ciudad de México rodaran cabezas ("In Mexico City, heads will roll")

Pay-per-view chronology
← Previous; Rey de Reyes	Next → Verano de Escándalo

Triplemanía chronology
← Previous; XVII	Next → XIX

Triplemanía XVIII (Triplemanía 18) was a professional wrestling pay-per-view (PPV) event produced by the AAA promotion that took place on June 6, 2010 at the Palacio de los Deportes ("Sports Palace") in Mexico City, Mexico. The show featured eight with the main events being a "dream match" between L.A. Park and La Parka with the rights to the La Parka name on the line as well as Electroshock defending the AAA Mega Championship against Dr. Wagner Jr. The show also featured a performance by El Tri, a Mexican blues/hard rock band after the wrestling portion of the show was over. All four title matches of the event saw the championship change hands, the show also featured appearances of wrestlers from competing wrestling promotions International Wrestling Revolution Group and Los Perros del Mal. The main event between L.A. Park and La Parka originally saw L.A. Park pin La Parka. Later on it was announced that the result thrown out by the Mexico City Boxing and Wrestling Commission due to outside interference, ruling it a no-contest, but the decision was reversed the next day as AAA declared that L.A. Park had earned the rights to the name "La Parka" with his victory. However, three days later AAA announced that they would respect the Commission's decision and declared the match thrown out.

Through TNA and AAA partnership representatives appeared at this event including Beer Money, Inc. (Robert Roode and James Storm), Atsushi Aoki and Go Shiozaki

== Production ==
=== Background ===
In early 1992 Antonio Peña was working as a booker and storyline writer for Consejo Mundial de Lucha Libre (CMLL), Mexico's largest and the world's oldest wrestling promotion, and was frustrated by CMLL's very conservative approach to professional wrestling, specifically the style of wrestling known as Lucha Libre (Spanish for "freestyle wrestling"). He joined forced with a number of younger, very talented wrestlers who felt like CMLL was not giving them the recognition they deserved and decided to split from CMLL to create Asistencia Asesoría y Administración, later known simply as "AAA" or Triple A. After making a deal with the Televisa television network AAA held their first show in April, 1992. The following year Peña and AAA held their first Triplemanía event, building it into an annual event that would become AAA's Super Bowl event, similar to the WWE's WrestleMania being the biggest show of the year. The 2010 Triplemanía was the 18th year in a row AAA held a Triplemanía show and the 23rd overall show under the Triplemanía banner.

=== Storylines ===
The Triplemanía XVIII show featured eight professional wrestling matches with different wrestlers involved in pre-existing scripted feuds, plots and storylines. Wrestlers were portrayed as either heels (referred to as rudos in Mexico, those that portray the "bad guys") or faces (técnicos in Mexico, the "good guy" characters) as they followed a series of tension-building events, which culminated in a wrestling match or series of matches.

The "Road to Triplemanía" began at AAA's previous major event Rey de Reyes which featured the beginning of new storylines and major turning points in other ongoing feuds. The driving force leading into Triplemanía was the developing "family feud" between AAA president Joaquin Roldan and his son Dorian. At Rey de Reyes Dorian Roldan turned on his father and stated that "a new era was about to begin". Dorian Roldan sided with Konnan and his La Legión Extranjera and introduced the returning L.A. Park to the stunned audience. Following the Rey de Reyes event Dorian Roldan and Konnan introduced several "outsiders" who sided with La Legión including the Pro Wrestling Noah team of Takeshi Morishima and Taiji Ishimori who won the AAA World Tag Team Championship from La Hermandad 187 (Nicho el Millonario and Joe Líder). Dorian Roldan was also instrumental in having Vampiro turn on Joaquin Roldan during an AAA show on April 18, 2010. During AAA's television taping on May 19, 2010 Dorian Roldan said that his father did not deserve to run AAA since he was not a blood relative of Antonio Peña like he was, just married into the family.

In one of the biggest stories of lucha libre in 2010 L.A. Park, the original La Parka, returned to AAA 13 years after he left the company on bad terms. In the intervening years then-AAA owner Antonio Peña had given the mask, outfit and ring name to a new wrestler, creating a second version of La Parka. Over the years AAA and the original Parka have been involved in a legal battle over the rights to the name, until reaching some sort of arrangement to work together again in 2010. L.A. Park's target from the first night has been the new La Parka, claiming that he was just a pale imitation. During an AAA show on March 19, 2010 L.A. Park attacked La Parka and threw him through a table. In order to maintain the illusion that L.A. Park did not actually work for AAA, thus enhancing the tension between the two characters, L.A. Park later claimed that he came to AAA to beat up La Parka, and since he had done that on March 19 he wasn't sure if he even felt like returning to AAA. L.A. Park did however return to an AAA ring as he had another brawl with La Parka on AAA's April 18 television taping. During the event La Parka challenged L.A. Park to a match at Triplemanía XVIII, under any stipulation that the original Parka wanted. During AAA's television taping on April 30, 2010 L.A. Park accepted La Parka's challenge for a match at Triplemanía XVIII. At an AAA press conference on May 12, 2010 it was announced that the match between the two would be for the rights to the name "La Parka". The two signed the official contract for the match during a television taping on May 19, 2010. After signing the contract Dorian Roldan had the police arrest La Parka for piracy by impersonating La Parka. He was released just in time to run in during the semi-main event to attack L.A. Park.

At Rey de Reyes Electroshock won the AAA Mega Championship by defeating Mr. Anderson and El Mesías. After the match Dr. Wagner Jr., leader of Los Wagnermaníacos a group Electroshock was part of, came to the ring to congratulate Electroshock, seemingly putting an end to the building tension between the two. On the March 19 show Dr. Wagner Jr. asked Electroshock to give him a shot at the title, something which Electroshock turned down but instead offered to fight him right then and there. After the two were separated by security it was clear that Electroshock was no longer part of Los Wagnermaniacos. At a later show Silver King, Dr. Wagner Jr.'s brother, interfered in a fight between the two by attacking his brother, siding with Electroshock. Silver King stated that he chose friendship over family and was siding with Electroshock in the storyline. On April 26, 2010 AAA confirmed on their website that Electroshock would defend the title against Dr. Wagner Jr. In the lead up to the title match the two faced off in a Steel Cage match on May 19, 2010, a match that Electroshock won with the help of Los Maniacos, Silver King and Último Gladiador. In the days before Triplemanía XVIII Silver King stated that their father, Dr. Wagner, had once told him that he was talented enough to not need the family name to make it in wrestling, while his brother needed all the help he could get, which was why he chose to give Dr. Wagner Jr. the family name.

At Héroes Inmortales III Sexy Star defeated Faby Apache, with the help of La Legión Extranjera, to win the AAA Reina de Reinas Championship. Following the match Sexy Star joined La Legión and began systematically targeting Faby and her sister Mari Apache. At the 2009 Guerra de Titanes Sexy Star defeated Faby Apache in a Lucha de Apuestas, hair vs. mask match forcing Faby Apache to have her hair cut after the match. During the winter of 2009 Cinthia Moreno returned to AAA and sided with the Apache sisters against La Legión. At the 2010 Rey de Reyes show the Apaches and Moreno defeated La Legión representatives Sexy Star, Rain and Christina Von Eerie. During one interview Sexy Star claimed that the Apaches and Cintia Moreno were nothing but maids, which led to AAA booking a match between Cinthia Moreno, Faby and Mari Apache against Sexy Star, Rain and Jennifer Blade in a match where the person pinned or submitted would have to be the winning team's slave for a month.

Extreme Tiger and Alex Koslov had been feuding for over a year, in a storyline that centered on the AAA Cruiserweight Championship. It began with Koslov becoming the first ever AAA Cruiserweight champion on May 23, 2009, only to lose the belt to Extreme Tiger 23 days later at Triplemanía XVII. Koslov regained the title at the 2009 Verano de Escandalo 2009 after turning rúdo. In the weeks following Verano de Escandalo, Koslov lost a match that lead to him being fired (in storyline terms) and the title was vacated. Tiger went on to win the vacant title, only to be the target of Koslov as he returned to AAA as part of La Legión Extranjera. In April AAA announced that the AAA Cruiserweight Championship would be defended in a "Four Nations" battle featuring Extreme Tiger (Mexico), Alex Koslov (Russia), Christopher Daniels (United States of America) and Nosawa (Japan). Daniels made his AAA debut during AAA's April 30, 2010 television taping in a match where he ended up pinning Extreme Tiger. It was later announced that Jack Evans would replace Alex Koslov in the match, removing the "Four Nations" concept for the match.

For over a year rúdo (bad guy) referee Hijo del Tirantes had been helping the rúdos win matches, deliberately overlooking any cheating and helping them win by counting faster than referees are supposed to during pinfalls. In the spring of 2010 referee Pierro finally spoke out about the biased refereeing and tried to put a stop to it. During AAA's April 30, 2010 television taping it was announced that each referee would choose three wrestlers to represent them in a match at Triplemanía XVIII where the hair of the referee was on the line. The six men involved in the match were announced at AAA's press conference on May 12, 2010. Pierro's team consisted of Heavy Metal, Octagón and Pimpinela Escarlata, while Hijo del Tirante's team featured Alex Koslov, Chessman and Hernandez. The May 12, 2010 press conference confirmed two further matches and also announced that Total Nonstop Action Wrestling's (TNA) Abyss would wrestle on the show, but did not announce an opponent for him at that time. It was later announced that Abyss would team up with Cibernético to wrestle in an Extreme rules Tag Team match against El Zorro and Vampiro. The two further matches announced were for the AAA World Mini-Estrellas Championship and the AAA World Tag Team Championship respectively. The Mini-Estrellas title would be defended in a Tables, Ladders, and Chairs match featuring defending champion Mini Abismo Negro as well as Mini Charly Manson, Octagoncito, Mascarita Divina, Mini Psicosis, Mini Histeria and Mascarita Sagrada.

The AAA World Tag Team Championship match was originally scheduled to feature then-current champions Takeshi Morishima and Taiji Ishimori defending against TNA representatives Beer Money, Inc. (Robert Roode and James Storm) and the winners of a tag team match between former champions La Hermandad 187 (Nicho and Joe Líder) and Los Maniacos (Silver King and Último Gladiador). The match between the two teams ended in a draw, which at the time left it unclear which team, if any of the teams would wrestle at Triplemanía XVIII. Two days later it was announced that both teams would wrestle at Triplemanía XVIII making the tag team title match a four-way match. On May 23, 2010 Go Shiozaki and Atsushi Aoki defeated Takeshi Morishima and Taiji Ishimori to win the AAA World Tag Team Championship during Pro Wrestling Noah's Navigation with Breeze - Day 1 show in Niigata, Niigata, Japan. As a result of the victory Shiozaki and Aoki would defend the titles in the four-way tag team championship match instead.

On May 27, 2010 during a press conference for the 2010 Lucha Libre Expo Silver King, Último Gladiador and Kenzo Suzuki showed up during International Wrestling Revolution Group's (IWRG) show to continue an AAA vs. IWRG storyline that had been building for approximately a month at that point in time by claiming that they would show up during IWRG's show at the Lucha Libre expo. A few days later IWRG booker Marco Moreno mentioned the possibility that the IWRG wrestlers may repay the interruption by appearing at Triplemanía XVIII in some form. After months of speculations Dorian Roldan announced that AAA had begun to work with the Perros del Mal wrestling promotion, owned and operated by Perro Aguayo Jr. and that Los Perros del Mal would be in attendance for the Triplemanía XVIII event, although their specific role was not announced.

== Competing events ==
In addition to Triplemanía XVIII June 6, 2010 also saw several other wrestling events in Mexico, including AAA themselves promotion a show in Monterrey, Nuevo León that featured most of the AAA wrestlers not booked for Triplemanía XVIII as well as a number of local wrestlers. AAA's rival Consejo Mundial de Lucha Libre (CMLL) held a major event of their own on the same night, in the same city as they presented Sin Salida in Arena México. IWRG also ran a show on June 6 which featured AAA representatives Real Fuerza Aérea members Aero Star, Laredo Kid and Super Fly defeating IWRG wrestlers Cerebro Negro, Freelance and Suicida, continuing the AAA vs. IWRG storyline.

== Event ==
Other on-screen personnel
Role:	Name:
Commentator	Dr. Alfonso Morales
Commentator	Andres Maroñas
Commentator	Arturo Rivera
Commentator	Jesús Zúñiga
Commentator	Konnan
Referee	Pepe "Tropi" Casas
Referee	El Pierro
Referee	Copetes Salazar
Referee	Hijo del Tirantes

=== Preliminary matches ===
The opening match of Triplemanía XVIII was the Tables, Ladders and Chairs match (TLC) for the AAA World Mini-Estrellas Championship, the first ever Mini-Estrellas TLC Match. In addition to the seven participants announced before the show the match also included La Parkita and Mini Chessman making it a nine-Mini-Estrellas match. Early in the match it became obvious that someone accidentally raised the title belt too high over the ring as the Minis were not able to reach it from the top of the ladders. At one point La Parkita powerbombed reigning champion Mini Abismo Negro out of the ring and through a table. Mini Histeria climbed the ladder and almost reached the championship belt, but Octagoncito stopped him and sent Mini Histeria through a table with a neckbreaker off the ladder, after which Mini Histeria was removed from the ring on a stretcher. In the end Octagoncito climbed the ladder to take the belt and became the new AAA World Mini-Estrellas Champion. After the match La Parkita was helped from the ring, favoring his shoulder. It was also reported that Mini Abismo Negro had to receive medical attention after the match.

The second match of the night was a Six-woman tag team match where the person pinned or submitted would have to serve as the slave of the winners for a month. La Legión Extranjera representatives Sexy Star, Rain and Jennifer Blade maintained the advantage in the night only through the biased refereeing of Hijo del Tirantes, who allowed La Legión to cheat repeatedly. After a while Mari Apache became fed up by Hijo del Tirantes' biased refereeing and landed a low blow on him. Blade took advantage of the distraction and hit Mari over the back of the head with a broomstick, earning the pinfall for her team. As a result of the loss Mari Apache will now be the servant of La Legión until July 6, 2010.

In the next match Silver King made his first official appearance under the name "Silver Cain", a way to get around Silver King not being allowed to wear his mask any more. During the introduction of the AAA World Tag Team Champions the announced mistakenly announced one of them Nosawa and then never introduced his partner. Throughout the match only Konnan, who was commentating the matches, knew the names of Atsushi Aoki and Go Shiozaki as well as who Beer Money, Inc. actually were. The champions were the first team eliminated when Joe Líder pinned Shiozaki following a double knee backbreaker. In the second fall Konnan left his announcing position, threw James Storm a steel chair and caused a distraction, which allowed him to hit Joe Líder with it and pin him for the second elimination. In the end Silver Cain pinned James Storm following a brainbuster to make Los Maniacos the new AAA World Tag Team Champions. Following the match Los Junior Capos (Máscara Año 2000 Jr. and Hijo de Cien Caras) from IWRG showed up and challenged the new tag team champions. This was the first time the IWRG vs. AAA rivalry was referenced on AAA television.

At this point the crowd was estimated to be about 85% capacity with people still entering, putting the attendance at around 17.000.

The fourth match, the Lucha de Apuesta for the hair of the referee, was surprisingly turned into a Steel Cage match without any build. The winning team would be the team where all three wrestlers first escaped the cage. Octagón was the first wrestler to escape the cage, quickly followed by Alex Koslov. Pimpinela Escarlata was almost out of the ring when he was stopped by Hernandez. Instead of fighting against Hernandez Escarlata surprised him with a big kiss, that distracted/disgusted Hernandez long enough for Escarlata to escape the cage. The 285 lb (129 kg) Hernandez shocked the crowd by diving off the top of the 15-foot-tall (4.6 m) cage onto the prone Heavy Metal before climbing out of the cage. This left Chessman and Heavy Metal in the cage. At one point Chessman had an opportunity to leave the cage, but instead opted to leap off the top of the cage for a moonsault, only for Heavy Metal to move at the last moment, sending Chessman crashing into the match. When Heavy Metal tried to climb out of the cage Hijo del Tirantes hit him with a chair to stop him from leaving the cage. Afterwards Chessman recovered enough to drag himself out of the ring, winning the match for his team. After the match El Pierro had all his hair shaved off.

=== Semi-main events ===
Cibernético and Abyss fought Vampiro and El Zorro in the next match, a hardcore match that quickly saw the interference of La Legión members Chessman, Christopher Daniels, Alex Koslov, Nosawa and Hernandez. After a while Cibernetico and Abyss were able to fight La Legión off. Near the end of the match Vampiro got into an argument with Konnan, resulting in Konnan tossing a handful of white powder into Vampiro's face. Blinded Vampiro was an easy target for Cibernético's Garra Cibernetica ("The Cybernetic Claw"; a chokeslam) for the pin fall. After the match La Legión attacked the two again, but were fought off, then beaten down by Cibernético, with assist from La Hermandad 187.

Extreme Tiger defended the AAA Cruiserweight title against three challengers in the seventh match of the night. In one of the most dangerous moves of the nights Extreme Tiger leapt off the top rope executing a 450° splash to Nosawa, who was prone on the floor. Moments later Tiger eliminated Nosawa using a diving stomp. Later on a wrestler wearing an Extreme Tiger mask came to ringside, distracting the real Extreme Tiger long enough for Christopher Daniels to pin him and eliminate him. Following Extreme Tiger's elimination the imitator removed the Extreme Tiger mask, revealing himself to be Relámpago. Evans won the match by pinning Daniels following a corkscrew 630° senton to earn his first ever AAA Championship.

=== Main events ===
The match for the AAA Mega Championship had originally been scheduled to go on last, but instead it became the second to last match, giving the L.A. Park vs. La Parka match the final spot on the show. The crowd was firmly behind Dr. Wagner Jr. in the match, chanting for the "Good Doctor" throughout most of the match. The match began as a clean, scientific match with Wagner and Electroshock displaying a variety of mat wrestling, exchanging holds and moves. The crowd began booing the match, after watching the buildup to the match they were not pleased with the clean, mat based wrestling even though Dr. Wagner Jr. was in control of most of the match. Dr. Wagner Jr. almost won the match when he used the Wagner Driver (a sitout scoop slam piledriver) on Electroshock, only to see the champion kick out at the very last moment. Electroshock later applied his Electrolock (a kneeling abdominal stretch with a figure four leglock), the same move that had won him both the 2009 Rey de Reyes and the AAA Mega Championship. Dr. Wagner Jr. managed to hold on and escape the hold only to apply another Wagner Driver on Electroshock. Following the Wagner Driver Dr. Wagner Jr. was able to pin Electroshock and win the championship for a second time. Following the match Electroshock shook Dr. Wagner Jr.'s hand as a sign of respect and then left the ring. Moments later El Mesías, still recovering from shoulder surgery, came to the ring to present Dr. Wagner Jr. with the belt and shook his hand.

The final match of Triplemanía XVIII was the battle over the name La Parka. First out was L.A. Park, accompanied by Dorian Roldan who carried L.A. Park's trademark steel chair with him to the ring. La Parka was accompanied by AAA managing director Joaquin Roldan. Both wrestlers came out to the sounds of Michael Jackson's Thriller, although neither were in the mood to dance before the match. The crowd support was divided although more behind the rúdo L.A. Park than they were behind the técnico La Parka. Early in the match L.A. Park landed three hard chair shots to his opponent, knocking him out of the ring. While on the floor L.A. Park threw a table into the ring and then threw La Parka into the steel barrier outside the ring. L.A. Park then sprayed La Parka in the face with a fire extinguisher and threw him into the crowd. The two fought back and forth in the crowd, throwing all rules out of the window. During the fight both wrestlers tore at their opponent's masks, almost tearing them completely apart, they two also bled heavily midway through the match. When the two returned to the ring La Parka threw L.A. Park off the top with a superplex that sent L.A. Park crashing through the table. While the crowd was generally split 50/50 for most of the match the boos were overwhelming when La Parka tried to pin L.A. Park, making it clear what outcome most of the fans were hoping for. A few minutes later the referee was accidentally knocked out of the ring, giving L.A. Park the opportunity to use a tombstone piledriver, a move that is illegal in Lucha Libre. Joaquin Roldan entered the ring, when L.A. Park attempted to use a steel chair on La Parka. When L.A. Park teased using the chair on Joaquin instead, Dorian entered the ring to protest, but was pushed down by Park, who then hit Joaquin with the chair, which caused Dorian to turn on him, hitting him with a steel chair three times.

Seconds later Halloween and Damián 666 from the Perros del Mal wrestling promotion ran to the ring to chase Dorian Roldan away. Then they dragged L.A. Park on top of La Parka before rúdo referee Hijo del Tirantes counted to three to give L.A. Park the victory. After the bell rings the rest of Los Perros del Mal, (Perro Aguayo Jr., Super Crazy, Hijo de L.A. Park, X-Fly, Black Warrior, Damián 666's son, Ragde and Pesadilla.) came to the ring to celebrate with L.A. Park who had won the rights to the name "La Parka". After a couple of minutes a group of AAA wrestlers led by Octagón came to ringside and in combination with the arena security managed to remove Los Perros del Mal from the ring. Marisela Roldan and the AAA wrestlers gave tribute to AAA founder Antonio Peña with Marisela promising that they would beat Los Perros del Mal. La Parka was taken from the ring on a stretcher, not having moved since L.A. Park applied the piledriver.

The show closed with a mini-concert by El Tri, followed by Marisela Peña making the announcement that due to the interference from Los Perros del Mal the main event results had been thrown out and declared a no-contest. The following day, during the post-Triplemanía press conference Dorian Roldan announced that L.A. Park had indeed won the match and was now officially known as La Parka once again while AAA's La Parka would have to change his name.

== Aftermath ==
The night after the show AAA held a press conference centered on Dorian Roldan apologizing to his mother Marisela Peña Roldan, making peace with her, turning técnico once more. The press conference also featured the unity of AAA with Konnan's La Legión Extranjera against a common enemy in the invading Los Perros del Mal. While Konnan was reluctant to trust AAA after having feuded with them for the previous 4–5 years the invading Perros del Mal forced his hand. On June 10 AAA announced that it would respect Mexico City Boxing and Wrestling Commission's decision to throw out the main event match between La Parka and L.A. Park and as a result both wrestlers would keep their names.

== Reception ==
The event received mainly positive reviews from critics, although the main event received mixed reviews; on a one hand, praised by the match itself, like Grita Radio described how the main event was so emotional that fans were on their feet with their hearts in their throats and Laura Fuentes and Armando Gutierrez of Luchas 2000 Magazine calling the main event as a "memorable battle". but heavily panned by the match's ending and the booking treatment on it.

An article in the Mexican newspaper Récord was very critical of the event, stating that it had started late, the fights were flat and that there was little public interest. The claims were refused by Súper Luchas magazine publisher Jorge Ocampo, stating that the author of the event was anti-AAA since the event had started exactly on time, the time printed on the tickets and that the crowd was more into the event than they had been for a long time. Ocampo also cited other factual errors in the article, stating that the author knew very little about wrestling.

=== Results ===
No.	Results	Stipulations	Times
1	Octagóncito defeated Mini Abismo Negro (c), Mini Charly Manson, Mascarita Divina, Mini Psicosis, Mini Histeria, Mascarita Sagrada, La Parkita and Mini Chessman	Tables, Ladders, and Chairs match for the AAA World Mini-Estrellas Championship	09:05
2	Las Gringas Locas (Sexy Star, Rain and Jennifer Blade) defeated Cinthia Moreno, Mari and Faby Apache	Six-woman tag team match. Loser must be the winners slave for a month.	09:23
3	Los Maniacos (Silver Cain and Último Gladiador) defeated Beer Money, Inc. (Robert Roode and James Storm), Atsushi Aoki and Go Shiozaki (c) and La Hermandad 187 (Nicho and Joe Líder)	Four-way elimination Tag team match for the AAA World Tag Team Championship	13:08
4	Team Hijo del Tirantes (Alex Koslov, Chessman and Hernandez) defeated Team Pierro (Heavy Metal, Octagón and Pimpinela Escarlata)	Steel Cage Lucha de Apuestas match with the hair of referees Pierro and Hijo del Tirantes on the line.	12:28
5	Cibernético and Abyss defeated El Zorro and Vampiro	Extreme rules Tag Team match	10:42
6	Jack Evans defeated Extreme Tiger (c), Christopher Daniels and Nosawa	Four Way Elimination for the AAA Cruiserweight Championship	13:51
7	Dr. Wagner Jr. defeated Electroshock (c)	Singles match for the AAA World Heavyweight Championship	22:35
8	L.A. Park defeated La Parka	Apuesta por el Nombre match for the rights to the name "La Parka"	28:50
(c) / – the champion(s) heading into the match

Order of escape - "Team Pierro" vs. "Team Hijo del Tirantes"

No.	Escape
1	Octagón
2	Alex Koslov
3	Pimpinela Escarlata
4	Hernandez
5	Chessman
6	Heavy Metal (last man in cage)
