= Último Gladiador =

Mexican professional wrestler

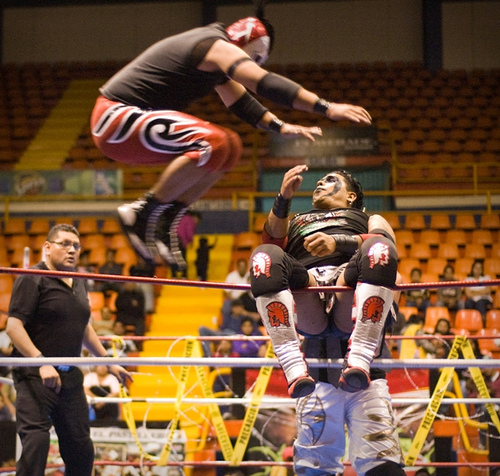
- Último Gladiador wrestling Trauma I at a DTU event

Personal information
- Born: Gerardo Campos Poza; March 28, 1978 (age 48)

Professional wrestling career
- Ring name(s): Demon Rocker; Mega; La Parka Negra (II); El Potro; Último Gladiador
- Billed height: 1.84 m (6 ft 1/2 in)
- Billed weight: 96 kg (212 lb)
- Trained by: Black Man; Rocky Santana; Pantera
- Debut: June 11, 1997

Gerardo Campos Poza (born March 28, 1978), better known under his ring name Último Gladiador (Spanish for "Last Gladiator") is a Mexican professional wrestler. From 2014 to 2018, Campos worked for the Mexican promotion Lucha Libre AAA Worldwide under the ring name Demon Rocker as a part of the group Los Inferno Rockers. Campos has previously wrestled under the name El Potro as well as being the first wrestler to play the masked Mega character for International Wrestling Revolution Group.

== Professional wrestling career ==
Campos trained for his professional under Black Man and Rocky Santana as well as receiving additional training by his uncle Pantera later on. He made his debut on June 11, 1997 as a rúdo (bad guy) character called El Potro ("The Colt") teaming with Bombero Infernal and Sumo Fuji against the team of Magnum Tokyo, Fantasy and Niebelina on an International Wrestling Revolution Group (IWRG) show. After wrestling as El Potro for two months he became the enmascarado (masked) character Mega, part of a group called Los Megas that would have also included Ultra Mega and Super Mega. He wrestled as Mega for about a year pairing with the original Super Mega (later Ultimo Vampiro IV), winning the hair of Judo Suwa at the final match of a ruleta de la muerte promoted in Arena Naucalpan. That match was well received by audience and lucha magazines. When he left IWRG the promotion gave the Mega character to Cesar Caballero.

After leaving IWRG he worked as El Potro for a few months before reinventing himself as Último Gladiador ("the last gladiator) as he began working for the local promotion Alianza Universal De Lucha Libre (AULL) based out of Arena Lopez Mateos Tlalnepantla in Tlalnepantla, Morelos, Mexico. As Último Gladiador Campos incorporated ring outfits that mirrored elements of the Roman Gladiators as well as face paint. During the seven years he wrestled in AULL he won two Lucha de Apuesta, or bet matches, against Popetikus, both times earning the right to shave Popetikus' hair off after the match. It was also during this time that his style of mixing Hardcore wrestling with high flying moves that earned him the nickname El Máximo Idolo Suicida de Tlalnepantla ("The Most Suicidal Idol of Tlalnepantla").

=== Lucha Libre AAA Worldwide (2008–2018) ===
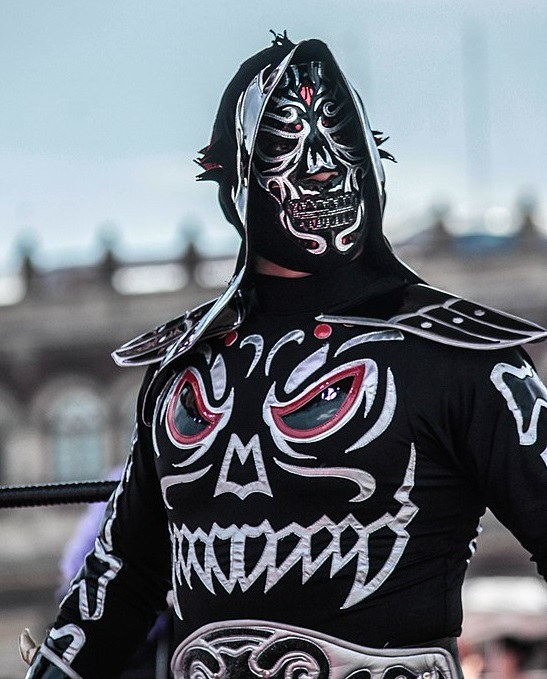
The mask and costume worn when working as La Parka Negra

Campos' relationship with wrestler Crazy Boy landed him a change to work for Lucha Libre AAA Worldwide (AAA), one of Mexico's largest wrestling promotions, when Crazy Boy hurt his back and needed someone to replace him in tag team matches. Último Gladiador joined the Mexican Powers and teamed with Juventud Guerrera and Joe Líder to make his AAA debut on February 10, 2008 in a match against La Familia de Tijuana (Halloween, Extreme Tiger and T.J. Xtreme). Gladiador was only meant to be a temporary replacement for Crazy Boy, but when Juventud Guerrera left the promotion he was made a permanent member of the Mexican Powers. Gladiador took Guerrera's place in the scheduled Triplemania XVI match where he teamed with Crazy Boy and Ricky Marvin to defeat the teams of La Legión Extranjera (Bryan Danielson, Jack Evans and Teddy Hart) and La Familia de Tijuana. Último Gladiador participated in the 2008 Alas de Oro tournament, but was eliminated as the fourth man by Extreme Tiger. Gladiador and Crazy Boy also received a shot at the AAA World Tag Team Championship in a four-way tag team match at Verano de Escandalo but were defeated by La Hermandad Extrema (Nicho el Millonario and Joe Lider, who had left the Mexican Powers), in the match that also featured The Hart Foundation 2.0 (Jack Evans and Teddy Hart) and defending champions La Familia de Tijuana (Extreme Tiger and Halloween). In the following months the Mexican Powers disintegrated, leaving Último Gladiador working random matches.

Following Dr. Wagner, Jr.'s AAA Mega Championship victory at Triplemania XVII, a group composed of Dr. Wagner, Jr, Silver King, Electroshock and a now masked Último Gladiador was formed, taking the name Los Wagnermaniacos after the group leader Dr. Wagner, Jr. Gladiador later claimed that AAA told him to put on a mask, feeling that without it he wasn't looking mean enough to be a rudo. At the 2008 Verano de Escandalo event Electroshock, Silver King and Último Gladiador teamed up to defeat La Parka, Marco Corleone and Octagón. At the 2009 Guerra de Titanes Los Wagnermaniacos lost to El Elegido, Extreme Tiger and Pimpinela Escarlata while Dr. Wagner, Jr. lost the AAA title to El Mesias.

At the 2010 Rey de Reyes Electroshock won the world title, following the match Dr. Wagner, Jr. and the other Wagnermaniacos came to the ring to congratulate Electroshock. On a subsequent AAA show Dr. Wagner, Jr. asked Electroshock for a title match, a request Electroshock declined leading to a fight between the two. At a later show Silver King, interfered in a fight between the two by attacking his brother Dr. Wagner, Jr., siding with Electroshock. Silver King stated that he chose friendship over family and was siding with Electroshock in the storyline. The two, along with Último Gladiador became known as Los Maniacos Dr. Wagner, Jr. after turning técnico continued Los Wagnermaniacos with Pimpinela Escarlata and Octagón to even the numbers. On April 26, 2010 AAA confirmed on their website that Electroshock would defend the title against Dr. Wagner, Jr. In May 2010 Silver King and Último Gladiador wrestled La Hermandad 187 (Nicho and Joe Lider) for the rights to wrestle for the AAA World Tag Team Championship at Triplemania XVIII. The match ended in a draw and it was later announced that both teams would be part of a four-way tag team championship match at Triplemania XVIII. On June 6, 2010, at Triplemania XVIII, Gladiador and Silver Cain (Silver King under a new name) outlasted three other teams, pinning James Storm of Beer Money, Inc. to win the AAA World Tag Team Championship, Silver King's first AAA title. Following the match Los Junior Capos (Máscara Año 2000, Jr. and Hijo de Cien Caras) from IWRG came to the ring to challenge the new champions for the title.

In spring of 2010 AAA began a storyline with IWRG, with the idea being that AAA was invading IWRG to show they were better than the IWRG wrestlers. Último Gladiador was one of the wrestlers featured in the feud, playing off his past in the IWRG. Gladiador's main focus has been Máscara Año 2000, Jr. who he defeated in a singles match on May 20, 2010 by count out.

In September 2010 Último Gladiador and Silver King announced that they were joining La Sociedad. Initially Electroshock made no official announcement on whether or not he would be following them, but agreed to represent the group at Héroes Inmortales IV in order to get his hands on Heavy Metal, with whom he had been feuding the past weeks. However, on November 14 he announced that he was not part of La Sociedad and urged Último Gladiador and Silver King to leave the group. After Electroshock turned La Sociedad down for the second time on November 18, Último Gladiador and Silver King turned on him and beat him down with La Milicia. On November 27 Silver King officially kicked Electroshock out of Los Maniacos, while also announcing that his spot in the group would be taken by a new member. On December 5 at Guerra de Titanes Silver King and Último Gladiador successfully defended the AAA World Tag Team Championship in a three–way ladder match against La Hermandad 187 and fellow La Sociedad members Hernandez and El Ilegal. On March 21, 2011, Los Maniacos lost the AAA World Tag Team Championship to Extreme Tiger and Jack Evans. In IWRG, Los Maniacos was joined by Joe Líder, with whom Último Gladiador and Silver King held the IWRG Intercontinental Trios Championship from March 3 to April 24. After losing the title to Los Psycho Circus, Gladiador and King turned on Líder and kicked him out of the group. Shortly thereafter, Gladiador and King joined forces with Chessman to form La Maniarquía. On June 18 at Triplemanía XIX, La Maniarquía was defeated by Electroshock, Heavy Metal and Joe Líder in a Tables, Ladders and Chairs match. At the event Gladiador also debuted a new look, a full gladiator outfit including a large helmet.

In 2013, Campos began working under a mask as the second Parka Negra, feuding with the original Parka Negra, El Zorro, before eventually handing the role over to another wrestler. In January 2014, Campos began working under a mask as Demon Rocker, a member of the Los Inferno Rockers stable.

== Private life ==
Campos is the nephew of luchador El Pantera, who also had a hand in training him, and the cousin of El Hijo del Pantera, the son of El Pantera.

== Championships and accomplishments ==
- Lucha Libre AAA Worldwide

- AAA World Tag Team Championship (1 time) – with Silver King

- International Wrestling League

- IWL International Tag Team Championship (1 time) - with Último Vampiro

- International Wrestling Revolution Group

- IWRG Intercontinental Trios Championship (1 time) – with Joe Líder and Silver King

- Pro Wrestling Illustrated
  - PWI ranked him #219 of the top 500 singles wrestlers in the PWI 500 in 2010

== Luchas de Apuestas record ==
Winner (wager)	Loser (wager)	Location	Event	Date	Notes
Mega (mask)	Judo Suwa (hair)	Naucalpan, Mexico State	IWRG show	December 20, 1998	(Note: The two met in the finals of a Ruleta de la Muerte, losers advance, tournament.)
Último Gladiador (hair)	Popetikus (hair)	N/A	Live event	N/A	
Último Gladiador (hair)	Popetikus (hair)	N/A	Live event	N/A	
Joe Líder (hair)	Último Gladiador (hair)	Naucalpan, Mexico State	RCH show	September 16, 2013	(Note: Three-way elimination hardcore match, which also included Daga.)
