= Antonio Peña Memorial Show (2008) =

2008 Lucha Libre AAA World Wide event

Antonio Peña Memorial show (2008)
- Logo for the Copa Antonio Peña
- Promotion: AAA
- Date: October 24, 2008
- City: Veracruz, Mexico
- Venue: Estadio De Beisbol Beto Avila
- Attendance: 15,500

Event chronology
← Previous; Verano de Escándalo	Next → Guerra de Titanes

Antonio Peña Memorial Shows chronology
← Previous; 2007	Next → III

The 2008 Antonio Peña Memorial Show (Homenaje a Antonio Peña in Spanish) was the second show held in honor of the deceased Antonio Peña, owner and creator of the Mexican Lucha Libre, or professional wrestling, company AAA. The show was held near the second anniversary of Peña's death from a heart attack. The main focus of the show was the second annual Copa Antonio Peña which was won by El Mesias as he survived a 13-man Gauntlet match defeating Pirata Morgan, El Elegido, Psicosis II, Dark Escoria, Silver King, Crazy Boy and Dark Cuervo one by one to win the Copa. The main event of the show saw La Legión Extranjera (Electroshock, Konnan, Rellik and Kenzo Suzuki) defeat "Team AAA" (Latin Lover, Octagón, La Parka and Super Fly). As a result of the win Konnan became the storyline owner of AAA. In the third main event of the evening Cibernético successfully defended the AAA Mega Championship against Chessman and El Zorro. The event has since been retrospectively renamed Héroes Inmortales II ("Immortal Heroes II").

== Production ==
=== Background ===
On October 5, 2006 founder of the Mexican professional wrestling, company AAA Antonio Peña died from a heart attack. The following year, on October 7, 2007, Peña's brother-in-law Jorge Roldan who had succeeded Peña as head of AAA held a show in honor of Peña's memory, the first ever Antonio Peña Memorial Show (Homenaje a Antonio Peña in Spanish). AAA made the tribute to Peña into a major annual event that would normally take place in October of each year, renaming the show series Héroes Inmortales (Spanish for "Immortal Heroes"), retroactively rebranding the 2007 and 2008 event as Héroes Inmortales I and Héroes Inmortales II. As part of their annual tradition AAA holds a Copa Antonio Peña ("Antonio Peña Cup") tournament with various wrestlers from AAA or other promotions competing for the trophy. The tournament is normally either a gauntlet match or a multi-man torneo cibernetico elimination match. Outside of the actual Copa Antonio Peña trophy the winner is not guaranteed any other "prizes" as a result of winning, although several Copa Antonio Peña winners did go on to challenge for the AAA Mega Championship. The 2008 show was the second show in what would become known as the Héroes Inmortales shows.

=== Storylines ===
The Antonio Peña Memorial Show featured six professional wrestling matches with different wrestlers involved in pre-existing, scripted feuds, plots, and storylines. Wrestlers were portrayed as either heels (referred to as rudos in Mexico, those that portray the "bad guys") or faces (técnicos in Mexico, the "good guy" characters) as they followed a series of tension-building events, which culminated in a wrestling match or series of matches.

=== Undercard matches ===
The first match of the Antonio Peña Memorial Show was a six-man Mini-Estrella match that saw the tecnico team of Mascarita Divina, Mini Charly Manson and Octagoncito defeat the rudo team of Mascarita de la Muerte, Mini Chessman and Mini Histeria. The second match on the undercard was a "AAA Special" Relevos Atómicos de locura match (Spanish for "Eight-man madness match") that featured two teams of four: a male wrestler, a female wrestler, an Exotico wrestler and a Mini-Estrella. The added stipulation here was that it was contested under "Lumberjack" rules, which means that other wrestlers surround the ring and is allowed to throw a wrestler back in the ring if they leave it. The team of Brazo de Plata (male), Faby Apache (female), Mascarita Sagrada (Mini-Estrella) and Pimpinela Escarlata (Exotico) defeated the Rudo team of El Brazo (male), Cinthia Moreno (Female), Mini Abismo Negro (Mini-Estrella) and Polvo de Estrellas (Exotico).

The third match on the card was a three way tag team Lucha de Escaleras, or Ladder Match, where La Hermandad Extrema (Spanish for "the Extreme Brotherhood"; Joe Líder and Nicho el Millonario) successfully the defended the AAA World Tag Team Championship against Los Bellos Stones ("The beautiful Stones"; Alan and Chris Stone) and The Hart Foundation 2.0 (Jack Evans and Teddy Hart).

=== Main event matches ===
The first of the three scheduled main events was the second annual Copa Antonio Peña Gauntlet match. The underlying storyline of the match was El Mesías' struggle with his former teammates in La Secta del Mesías and La Legión Extranjera after turning tecnico in the preceding month. El Mesías was the seventh participant in the match, with Histeria, Gato Eveready, Extreme Tiger, Pirata Morgan, Aero Star and El Alebrije having already been eliminated. El Mesias stayed in the ring from entrant seven until the final participant, eliminating six wrestlers in total; El Elegido, Psicosis II, Dark Escoria, Silver King, Crazy Boy and Dark Cuervo to win the Copa. After the match Cibernético saved El Mesías from a La Legión attack, enforcing El Mesias status as a tecnico.

In the fifth match of the night Cibernético defended the AAA Mega Championship against former teammate Chessman and La Legión deputy leader El Zorro in a Three way Street Fight, a match with no rules. The match saw all three wrestlers use various objects such as chairs and tables and also saw interference from La Legión, drawing blood from all participants. In the end Cibernético retained the title by pinning El Zorro while Chessman was incapacitated from missing a move off the top rope.

The last match of the evening was the continuation of the long running "AAA vs. La Legión storyline that had been the main focus of AAA for over two years. The match was a six man Steel cage elimination match where the winning team would win the storyline control of AAA, if "Team AAA" (Latin Lover, Octagón, La Parka and Super Fly) won Joaquin Roldan, brother-in-law of Antonio Peña would remain in charge of AAA, while if La Legión Extranjera (Electroshock, Konnan, Kenzo Suzuki and a "surprise wrestler") won La Legión leader Konnan would be in charge of AAA. An urn supposedly containing the ashes of Antonio Peña was brought to ringside, symbolizing the control of AAA that was at stake. In order to win the match the entire team had to escape the cage. Konnan introduced Rellik as La Legión's surprise wrestler, who joined AAA shortly after being fired from Total Nonstop Action Wrestling, and announced that if La Legión won Rellik would be the "Keeper of the urn". The first to escape was Octagón, quickly followed by Kenzo Suzuki, next La Parka and Electroshock escaped, keeping the two sides even in the cage. Super Fly and Rellik were the next two to leave the cage leaving only Latin Lover and Konnan in the match. La Legión won the match when Konnan was able to escape due to interference from Solo Para Mujeres TV host Sergio Mayer, who threw what was supposed to be urine at Latin Lover’s face when he tried to escape the cage. Following the victory Konnan gained possession of the urn to siginify his storyline power over the promotion.

== Aftermath ==
Following the Memorial show where Konnan took the storyline control of the promotion Cibernético announced that he would not work for Konnan and vacated the AAA Mega Championship. Initially believed to be an elaborate storyline Cibernético then quit AAA and began working on the Mexican independent circuit. Blurring the lines of storyline and real life animosity Cibernético did not work for AAA for 10 months, returning only after Konnan lost the storyline control of AAA at Triplemanía XVII and disbanded La Legión Extranjera.

El Mesías won the vacant AAA Mega Championship at the 2008 Guerra de Titanes and further cemented his status as the top tecnico of the promotion following Cibernético's departure.

== Results ==
No.	Results	Stipulations
1	Mascarita Divina, Mini Charly Manson and Octagoncito defeated Mascarita de la Muerte, Mini Chessman and Mini Histeria	Six-man "Lucha Libre rules" tag team match
2	Brazo de Plata, Faby Apache, Mascarita Sagrada and Pimpinela Escarlata defeated El Brazo, Cinthia Moreno, Mini Abismo Negro and Polvo de Estrellas	Relevos Atómicos de locura Lumberjack match
3	La Hermandad Extrema (Joe Líder and Nicho el Millonario) defeated Los Bellos Stones (Alan and Chris Stone) and The Hart Foundation 2.0 (Jack Evans and Teddy Hart)	Three way Ladder Match for the AAA World Tag Team Championship
4	El Mesías won the Copa Antonio Peña	Copa Antonio Peña Gauntlet match
5	Cibernético defeated Chessman and El Zorro	Three way Street Fight
6	La Legión Extranjera (Electroshock, Konnan, Rellik and Kenzo Suzuki) defeated Team AAA (Latin Lover, Octagón, La Parka and Super Fly); Order of escape: Octagón, Kenzo Suzuki, Latin Lover, Electroshock, Super Fly, Rellik, La Parka, Konnan.	Steel cage elimination match.

Copa Antonio Peña Gauntlet match order of elimination

1. Histeria pinned Gato Eveready
2. Extreme Tiger pinned Histeria
3. Pirata Morgan pinned Extreme Tiger
4. Pirata Morgan pinned Aero Star
5. Pirata Morgan pinned El Alebrije
6. El Elegido pinned Pirata Morgan
7. El Mesias pinned El Elegido
8. El Mesías pinned Psicosis II
9. El Mesias pinned Dark Escoria
10. El Mesías pinned Silver King
11. El Mesías pinned Crazy Boy
12. El Mesías pinned Dark Cuervo
