= Rey de Reyes (2010) =

2010 Lucha Libre AAA World Wide event

Rey de Reyes 2010
- Promotion: AAA
- Date: March 12, 2010
- City: Querétaro, Querétaro, Mexico
- Venue: Plaza de Toros Santa María
- Attendance: 8,000

Pay-per-view chronology
← Previous; Guerra de Titanes	Next → Triplemanía XVIII

Rey de Reyes chronology
← Previous; 2009	Next → 2011

The Rey de Reyes 2010 (Spanish for "King of Kings") was a major annual professional wrestling show that also hosted that year's version of the Rey de Reyes tournament, produced by the Mexican wrestling promotion AAA. The show took place on March 12, 2010 in Querétaro, Mexico at Plaza de Toros Santa Maria in Querétaro, Querétaro, Mexico. The event was the 14th event produced under the Rey de Reyes name and also the 14th time that the Rey de Reyes tournament was held. The 2010 Rey de Reyes tournament saw Chessman win the title by defeating Marco Corleone and Hernandez. In addition to the Rey de Reyes tournament, the card featured a main event for the AAA Mega Championship, where champion El Mesias lost the title to Electroshock in a match that also featured Total Nonstop Action Wrestling's (TNA) Mr. Anderson. The surprise of the evening was the return of L.A. Park to AAA after years of legal battles over the "La Parka" name, mask and likeness. Upon his return, he immediately targeted AAA's version of La Parka.

== Production ==
=== Background ===
Starting in 1997 and every year since then the Mexican Lucha Libre, or professional wrestling, company AAA has held a Rey de Reyes (Spanish for "King of Kings') show in the spring. The 1997 version was held in February, while all subsequent Rey de Reyes shows were held in March. As part of their annual Rey de Reyes event AAA holds the eponymious Rey de Reyes tournament to determine that specific year's Rey. Most years the show hosts both the qualifying round and the final match, but on occasion the qualifying matches have been held prior to the event as part of AAA's weekly television shows. The traditional format consists of four preliminary rounds, each a four-man elimination match with each of the four winners facing off in the tournament finals, again under elimination rules. There have been years where AAA has employed a different format to determine a winner. The winner of the Rey de Reyes tournament is given a large ornamental sword to symbolize their victory, but is normally not guaranteed any other rewards for winning the tournament, although some years becoming the Rey de Reyes has earned the winner a match for the AAA Mega Championship. From 1999 through 2009 AAA also held an annual Reina de Reinas ("Queen of Queens") tournament, but later turned that into an actual championship that could be defended at any point during the year, abandoning the annual tournament concept. The 2010 show was the 14th Rey de Reyes show in the series.

=== Storylines ===
The Rey de Reyes show featured nine professional wrestling matches with different wrestlers involved in pre-existing, scripted feuds, plots, and storylines. Wrestlers were portrayed as either heels (referred to as rudos in Mexico, those that portray the "bad guys") or faces (técnicos in Mexico, the "good guy" characters) as they followed a series of tension-building events, which culminated in a wrestling match or series of matches.

At the 2009 Guerra de Titanes El Mesias defeated Dr. Wagner Jr. to win the AAA Mega Championship in a Domo De La Muerte cage match. At the same event Latin Lover won an eight-man elimination match to become the number one contender for the AAA Mega Championship. In the weeks following Guerra de Titanes El Mesias and Latin Lover began regularly teaming together, often to face the Los Wagnermaniacos team of Dr. Wagner Jr. and Electroshock. Following a match in January, in which Electroschok pinned El Mesias, Electroshock demanded that he should be added to the World title match at Rey de Reyes 2010 since he won the 2009 Rey de Reyes tournament. The demand angered teammate Dr. Wagner, Jr. who was hoping to get a rematch for the title himself. In the weeks leading up to Rey de Reyes Mesias and Latin Lover faced Los Wagnermaniacos again, with Electroshock winning once more. While tension built between Dr. Wagner Jr. and Electroshock the two reluctantly remain a team. On February 20, 2010 Joaquin Roldan, head of AAA, announced that Electroshock had been added to the Rey de Reyes main event. On February 26 it was revealed that the title match would be a four-way match, with Total Nonstop Action Wrestling (TNA) wrestler Mr. Kennedy competing in the title match.

The storyline between Konnan and Cibernético goes back to 2008 and has seen reality and fiction mix as the two wrestles animosity towards each other has been evident in various interviews on television, radio or the net. Following Konnan's return to AAA in the fall of 2009 he has had several confrontations with Cibernético, including an "unsanctioned" streetfight at the 2009 Guerra de Titanes which Konnan won through outside interference. Following the event Cibernético did not appear for several AAA events to illustrate how brutal the match at Guerra de Titanes was. When he finally did return he had allied himself with Los Psycho Circus to counter Konnan's La Legión Extranjera and even the sides. During an AAA Television taping on February 18, 2010 in Toluca, Mexico State Cibernético challenged Konnan to a Lumberjack match, continuing the storyline between the two that started before the 2009 Guerra de Titanes event.

In the weeks leading up to the show AAA announced that the Rey de Reyes tournament would consist of three four-way elimination matches instead of the four it usually consists off. The announced field for the tournament were La Parka, El Zorro, Chessman, Octagón, El Elegido, Crazy Boy, Kenzo Suzuki, Marco Corleone, Jack Evans, Dark Ozz, Decnnis and a "surprise wrestler". It was later revealed that TNA wrestler Hernandez was the "Surprise" competitor.

== Event ==
=== Preliminary matches ===
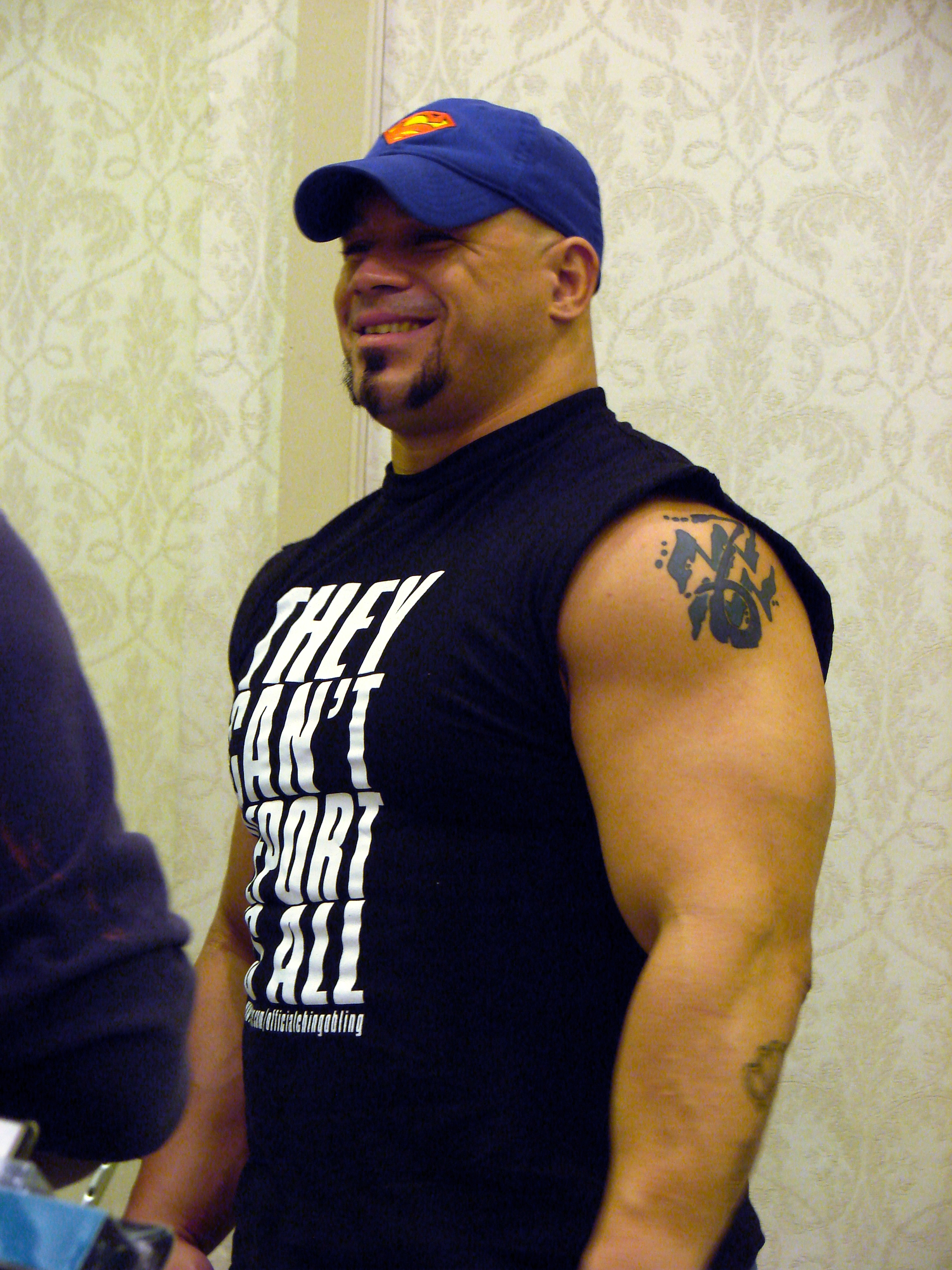
Hernandez: one of the finalists of the Rey de Reyes tournament

The opening match was supposed to feature Jennifer Blade but on the night she was replaced by Sexy Star without explanation. Sexy Star, Rain and Christina Von Eerie took on Faby Apache, Mari Apache and Cinthia Moreno. The Apaches and Moreno won when Moreno pinned Sexy Star following a chinbreaker.

The first Rey de Reyes semi-final four-way elimination match saw Dark Ozz and Jack Evans eliminated early on with Marco Corleone pinning Decniss to qualify for the final. In the second semi-final match El Elegido was the first eliminated, then Kenzo Suzuki was pinned, leaving Hernandez and Crazy Boy. Hernandez qualified for the final match by pinning Crazy Boy cleanly. In the final semi-final Octágon and El Zorro were quickly eliminated leaving only Chessman and La Parka. In the final moments of the match Chessman knocked La Parka down with a Spear followed by a fast three count by rudo referee Hijo del Tirantes.

The fifth match was for the AAA Cruiserweight Championship with current champion Extreme Tiger defending against former two-time champion Alex Koslov. The match featured several "extreme" elements including the use of thumbtacks. During the match Koslov bled profusely, which was the first time in his career a match had drawn blood from him. Koslov tried to get the victory with a low blow, a tactic that had earned him a victory against Extreme Tiger at the 2009 Verano de Escandalo, but this time failed as Extreme Tiger wore a protective cup. Tiger won the match when he pinned Koslov in the middle of a pile of thumbtacks scattered all over the ring.

The stipulation of the sixth match was that if Pimpinella Escarlata's team won he would get a spot in Los Wagnermaniacos, if his team lost he had to stop trying to join. Escarlata had hired the help of Los Hermandad 187 (Nicho el Millonario and Joe Líder) in his match against Dr. Wagner Jr., Silver King and Último Gladiador. La Hermandad pinned Último Gladiador, earning an ecstatic Pimpinella Escarlata a spot in Los Wagnermaniacos. Following the match Dr. Wagner Jr. and Silver King both seemed very displeased with Último Gladiador's performance in the match.

=== Main event matches ===
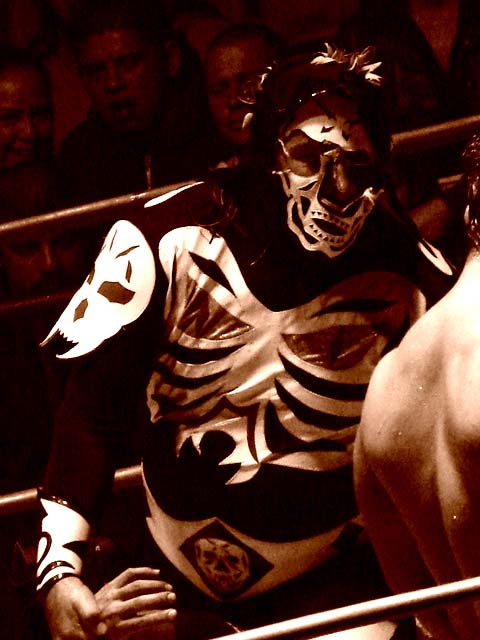
L.A. Park, who returned to AAA after years of absence

Before the seventh match Dorian Roldan, son of AAA boss Joaquin Roldan, was seen backstage talking to a person who remained in the shadows. Roldan talked about the beginning of the "Dorian Roldan era" tonight.

The seventh match of the evening pitted Cibernético against Konnan in a Lumberjack match. The lumberjacks for the match were Cibernético's allies Los Psycho Circus and Konnan's La Legión Extranjera who gathered around the ring to keep the two wrestlers in the ring at all times. The match between the two resembled a fight more than a professional wrestling match, including Konnan's forehead bleeding profusely. During the match La Legión attacked Cibernético but Los Psycho Circus were able to hold La Legión off while Cibernético applied the Garra Cibernetica ("Cibernético Claw; a Chokeslam) on Konnan to gain the victory. After the match La Legión, including TNA worker Hernandez, attacked Cibernético, drawing out El Mesias to aid Cibernético. After a couple of moments of fighting Dorian Roldan and a man wearing a black trenchcoat and a black balaclava comes to the ring, attacking Cibernético and El Mesias to give La Legión the advantage.

After the attack the mystery man removes his trench coat and balaclava to reveal himself as L.A. Park, the original La Parka who had been involved in a heated legal battle with AAA for many years. After the shock of seeing L.A. Park in an AAA ring again subsided Joaquin Roldan and the current La Parka came to the ring, with La Parka being restrained from attacking L.A. Park. In the ring L.A. Park reminded everyone that he was on Konnan's side in World Championship Wrestling (WCW) and he was on Konnan's side now in his fight against AAA. The current La Parka grabbed a microphone and thanked Dorian Roldan for bringing "the pig" back to AAA so he could unmask him. The segment ended with the two Parkas being kept from attacking each other.

The second to last match of the evening was the finals of the Rey de Reyes tournament pitting the three semi-final winners against each other in a three-way elimination match. Hernandez was the first man eliminated as he was pinned by Marco Corleone. Corleone was then pinned by Chessman following a superkick, after interference from Hernandez, to win the tournament. After the match Chessman accepted the sword that symbolizes the Rey de Reyes victory.

The main event of the evening was supposed to be a four-way match for the AAA Mega Championship but Latin Lover did not show up for the match, no-showing the event without explanation. Instead the match became a three-way match with the first wrestler to gain a pinfall becoming the Champion. During his ring entrance Mr. Anderson wore a "La Parka" mask, only to throw it down and proceed to insult Mexico and Mexican wrestlers. El Mesias' participation in the match was hampered by the attack he suffered earlier and was still selling in the main event. The conclusion saw Electroshock defeat Mr. Anderson when he applied the "Electrolock" submission hold, making Mr. Anderson tap out before El Mesias could return to the ring. Following the match El Mesias was carried from the arena on a stretcher. After being presented with the championship belt Los Wagnermaniacos, except new member Pimpinella Escarlata, came to the ring. At first it looked like Dr. Wagner, Jr. was going to attack Electroshock but instead he congratulated him with a handshake, reconciling their past differences.

== Aftermath ==
The 2010 Rey de Reyes event was the start of the "Road to Triplemania XVIII" as both of the Triplemania XVIII main events arose from the Rey de Reyes. The appearance of L.A. Park led to a storyline between the original La Parka and the new La Parka where the two would face off at Triplemania over the rights to the name "La Parka". Following Electoshocks title victory fellow Wagnermaniaco Dr. Wagner Jr. requested a title shot, which Electroshock turned down and then turned on Dr. Wagner Jr. subsequently Silver King and Último Gladiador sided with Electroshock to form Los Maniacos. At Triplemania XVIII Electroshock will defend the championship against Dr. Wagner, Jr. The issues between the group of Faby and Mari Apache and Cynthia Moreno and La Legión continued beyond Rey de Reyes as Sexy Star claimed that the Apaches and Cintia Moreno were nothing but maids, which led to AAA booking a match between Cynthia Moreno, Faby and Mari Apache against Sexy Star, Rain and Jennifer Blake in a Triplemania XVIII match, where the loser of the fall would have to serve as the winning team's slave for a month.

== Results ==
No.	Results	Stipulations	Times
1	Faby Apache, Mari Apache and Cinthia Moreno defeated Las Gringas Locas (Rain, Christina Von Eerie and Sexy Star)	Six-woman tag team match	09:32
2	Marco Corleone defeated Jack Evans, Dark Ozz and Decnnis; Order of elimination: Ozz (by Jack Evans), Jack Evans (by Decniss), Decniss (by Marco Corleone)	Rey de Reyes semi-final four-way elimination match	07:58
3	Hernandez defeated El Elegido, Crazy Boy and Kenzo Suzuki; Order of elimination: Crazy Boy (by Hernandez), Kenzo Suzuki (by Elegido), El Elegido (by Hernandez)	Rey de Reyes semi-final four-way elimination match	07:52
4	Chessman defeated La Parka, El Zorro and Octagón; Order of elimination: Octagón (by Chessman and Zorro), Zorro (by La Parka), La Parka (by Chessman)	Rey de Reyes semi-final four-way elimination match	06:45
5	Extreme Tiger (c) defeated Alex Koslov	Singles match for the AAA Cruiserweight Championship	07:55
6	Pimpinela Escarlata and La Hermandad 187 (Nicho el Millonario and Joe Líder) defeated Los Wagnermaniacos (Dr. Wagner Jr., Silver King and Último Gladiador)	Six-man tag team match, if Pimpinela Escarlata's team wins he joins Los Wagnermaniacos	11:46
7	Cibernético defeated Konnan	Lumberjack match	07:29
8	Chessman defeated Marco Corleone and Hernandez; Order of elimination: Hernandez (by Corleone), Corleone (by Chessman)	Rey de Reyes final three-way elimination match	09:04
9	Electroshock defeated El Mesias (c) and Mr. Anderson	Singles match for the AAA Mega Championship	11:04
(c) / – the champion(s) heading into the match

=== Tournament bracket ===
1st Round; Sin Limite: Rey de Reyes; March 12, 2010 (Aired: March 28)
Decnis	7:58
Jack Evans	—
Marco Corleone	Win (Note: This was a four-way elimination match. Order of elimination: Dark Ozz, Jack Evans, Decnis)
Dark Ozz	—
Crazy Boy	—
El Elegido	—
Hernandez	Win (Note: This was a four-way elimination match. Order of elimination: Crazy Boy, Kenzo Suzuki, El Elegido)
Kenzo Suzuki	7:52
Chessman	Win (Note: This was a four-way elimination match. Order of elimination: Octagón, El Zorro, La Parka)
El Zorro	—
La Parka	6:05
Octagón	—

Final; Sin Limite: Rey de Reyes; March 12, 2010 (Aired: March 28)
Marco Corleone	9:04
Hernandez	—
Chessman	Win (Note: This was a three-way elimination match. Order of elimination: Hernandez, Marco Corleone)
