= Sexy Star =

Mexican wrestler, MMA fighter (born 1982)

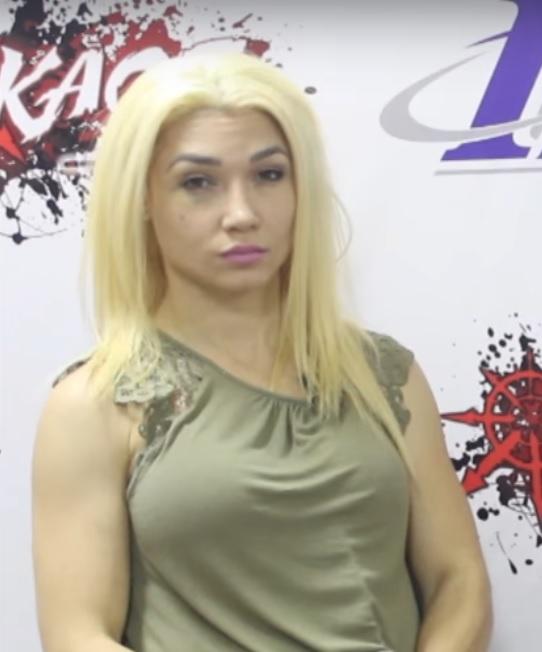
- García in 2017
- Born: Dulce María García Rivas; September 20, 1982 (age 44); Monterrey, Nuevo León, Mexico
- Spouse: Jhonny González (m. 2015)
- Children: 1
- Professional wrestling career
- Ring name(s): Dulce Poly; Sexy Dulce; Sexy Star
- Trained by: Humberto Garza Jr. Mr. Lince; Gran Apache; Abismo Negro
- Debut: August 29, 2006
- Boxing career Martial arts career
- Division: Bantamweight
- Stance: Orthodox

Professional boxing record
- Total: 5
- Wins: 5
- By knockout: 1
- Losses: 0
- By knockout: 0
- Mixed martial arts career Martial arts career
- Division: Flyweight
- Stance: Orthodox

Mixed martial arts record
- Total: 3
- Wins: 2
- By submission: 1
- By decision: 1
- Losses: 1
- By knockout: 1

Other information
- Mixed martial arts record from Sherdog

Dulce María García Rivas (born September 20, 1982) is a Mexican professional wrestler, mixed martial artist and professional boxer who is better known by the ring name Sexy Star. She is best known for her work in Lucha Libre AAA Worldwide (AAA), where she is a three-time AAA Reina de Reinas Champion, while also being a former one-time AAA World Mixed Tag Team Champion. She previously wrestled under the name Dulce Poly and held both the FILL Women's Championship and the FILL Mixed Tag Team Championship under that name. She worked for Lucha Underground, where she was a former Lucha Underground Champion and Gift of the Gods Champion. She is the first woman to win the Lucha Underground Championship.

García has competed as a boxer since 2017, winning all five of her professional fights to date. She also won in her mixed martial arts debut for Combate Americas in 2019. She currently remains undefeated as a fighter for the company Combate Global before Combate Americas. García became the center of a controversy in August 2017 following a match at Triplemanía XXV, during which she legitimately injured Rosemary with a shoot armbar. This resulted in a backlash in the wrestling world, and was soon followed by her firing from AAA and stripping of the AAA Reina de Reinas title.

García is the first woman in the history of Mexican sports to compete in at least one boxing match, mixed martial arts match, and professional wrestling match.

== Early life ==
Dulce García was born on September 20, 1982, in Monterrey, Nuevo León. Growing up she had devoted herself to sports such as boxing, kickboxing and Muay Thai. She also earned a college degree in Communication Sciences and worked in that field until she became a professional wrestler.

== Professional wrestling career ==
García made her professional wrestling debut on August 29, 2006, under the ring name Dulce Poly, on a Federacion Internacional de Lucha Libre (FILL) show. In FILL she often teamed up with one of her trainers, Humberto Garza Jr. and together the two won the FILL Mixed Tag Team Championship at one point. She also won the FILL Women's Championship on December 17, 2006. She held the title until February 27, 2007, when she lost the title to La Bandiad.

=== AAA / Lucha Libre AAA Worldwide ===
==== Early storylines (2007–2009) ====
A few weeks after losing the FILL Women's Championship García made her debut for AAA as the enmascarada (masked) character Sexy Star, a técnica (fan favorite character, or Face). Her first match for AAA saw her on the losing side of a Relevos Atómicos de locura match (Spanish for "Eight-man madness match") where she teamed up with Billy Boy, Octagóncito and Pimpinela Escarlata losing to Faby Apache, Gran Apache, Mini Chessman and Polvo de Estrellas. After joining AAA she received further training from both Abismo Negro and Gran Apache, AAA's main trainer for luchadoras. Sexy Star participated in the 2007 Reina de Reinas (Spanish for "Queen of Queens") tournament, and was one of six women to survive a 16-woman torneo cibernetico match. The finals of the tournament saw Tiffany outlast Sexy Star, Cinthia Moreno, Faby Apache, Miss Janeth, and Rossy Moreno to win the tournament. The following year Sexy Star once again competed in the annual Reina de Reinas tournament, but lost to Mari Apache in a five-way match that also included Chikayo Nagashima, Martha Villalobos, and Sonoko Kato.

==== Teaming with Billy Boy (2009) ====
Sexy Star's first major angle in AAA began in early 2009 as she was written into a long running storyline between real life husband and wife Billy Boy and Faby Apache. She was introduced as the new object of Billy Boy's affections after Billy Boy had turned rúdo (bad guy, or Heel) on Faby Apache. When Aero Star entered the picture as a possible suitor for Faby Apache, Billy Boy acted like he did not care as he himself had found a new love in Sexy Star, who in the process turned rúdo (villain) in the storyline. During a television taping on March 21, 2010, Aero Star came to the ring and asked Gran Apache's permission to ask Faby Apache out, which led to Billy Boy storming to the ring and attacking Aero Star. The storyline evolved and saw all four involved in an intergender Lucha de Apuesta Steel Cage Match where the last person in the ring would either have their hair shaved off or be forced to unmask. The match took place on the 2009 Verano de Escandalo show and came down to Faby Apache and Billy Boy in the cage, after which Faby Apache pinned Billy Boy. After the match Billy Boy's hair was shaved off as Faby Apache celebrated her win.

==== Reina de Reinas Champion (2009–2016) ====
Following the Apuesta loss the storyline began to focus more on the rivalry between Faby Apache and Sexy Star and less on Billy Boy. The two faced off in a "Bull Terrier" match for Faby Apache's AAA Reina de Reinas Championship during AAA's Heroes Inmortales III event, in which Sexy Star defeated Faby Apache due to the interference of La Legión Extranjera members Jennifer Blade and Rain. In the time following the title victory Sexy Star became a member of La Legión, making her the only Mexican female in the group. The storyline between Sexy Star and Faby Apache continued at the 2009 Guerra de Titanes where Sexy Star defeated Faby Apache in a Lucha de Apuesta match, thanks to the interference of La Legión. On the same night Cinthia Moreno returned to AAA, siding with Faby Apache in her fight against La Legión. This meant that Moreno, Faby, and her sister Mari Apache faced off against Sexy Star, Rain, and Christina Von Eerie during the 2010 Rey de Reyes event, a match which Moreno won for her team by pinning Sexy Star. During a post Rey de Reyes interview Sexy Star claimed that the Apaches and Cintia Moreno were nothing but maids, which led to AAA booking a match between Cinthia Moreno, Faby, and Mari Apache against Sexy Star, Rain, and Jennifer Blade in a Triplemania XVIII match where the person pinned or submitted would have to be the winning team's slave for a month. At Triplemania La Legión defeated Moreno and the Apaches, when Blade pinned Mari, thanks in part to the biased refereering by Hijo del Tirantes. Following the match Konnan ordered Mari Apache to begin her maid duty right away by cleaning up their dressing room. The stipulation expired on July 6, 2010.

On August 14 at Verano de Escandalo, Sexy Star lost the Reina de Reinas Championship to Mari Apache in a six-person tag team match, where she, Alex Koslov, and Christina Von Eerie faced the Apaches and Aero Star. Just prior to her title loss, she had traveled to Tampa, Florida to take part in World Wrestling Entertainment's developmental territory Florida Championship Wrestling's tryouts, but was rejected by the promotion, who claimed that her English and wrestling were subpar, and that she was overweight and not attractive enough without her mask. Afterward, AAA removed Sexy Star from La Legión Extranjera and demoted her to random opening matches or simply not booking her at all, which eventually led to her considering a jump to Consejo Mundial de Lucha Libre. Eventually in March 2011, Sexy Star once again began appearing with La Legión Extranjera under the La Sociedad banner, teaming with Jennifer Blake and feuding with the Apaches and the recently debuted Lolita. On June 18 at Triplemanía XIX, Sexy teamed with Total Nonstop Action Wrestling wrestlers Angelina Love, Mickie James, and Velvet Sky to defeat Cynthia Moreno, Faby Apache, Lolita, and Mari Apache.

On December 16 at Guerra de Titanes, Sexy Star defeated Pimpinela Escarlata in a lumberjack match to win the AAA Reina de Reinas Championship for the second time. On March 18 at Rey de Reyes, Sexy Star took part in a twelve-person steel cage Hairs vs. Masks match, which eventually came down to her and Pimpinela Escarlata. In the end, Sexy Star managed to escape the cage, forcing Escarlata to have his head shaved. On May 19, in her first title defense, Sexy Star defeated Cynthia Moreno, Faby Apache and Lolita in a Bull Terrier match. On November 27, Sexy Star put her AAA Reina de Reinas Championship on the line in the 2012 Reina de Reinas tournament, which AAA held in collaboration with Pro Wrestling Wave in Tokyo's Korakuen Hall. After defeating Jennifer Blake in her opening match, she defeated Kaguya in the finals to win the tournament and retain the Reina de Reinas Championship.

On February 19, 2013, Sexy Star vacated the Reina de Reinas Championship and became inactive for an undisclosed reason, which was later revealed to be her pregnancy.

Sexy Star returned to AAA on December 8, 2013, at Guerra de Titanes, taking part in an eight-way steel cage Hair vs. Hair match. She managed to escape the cage, saving her hair. On April 19, 2014, Sexy Star and Pentagón Jr. defeated Drago and Faby Apache, and Dark Cuervo and Mari Apache in a three-way match to win the AAA World Mixed Tag Team Championship for the first time. On February 5, 2016, Sexy Star announced she was relinquishing the AAA World Mixed Tag Team Championship. Later that month, it was reported that García had quit AAA. Reportedly, she had contacted the AAA office, stating that she was retiring from professional wrestling.

==== Return (2017) ====
On July 16, 2017, Sexy Star made a surprise return to AAA, winning the vacant Reina de Reinas Championship. She gained some attention on August 26, 2017, when she submitted and injured Rosemary with a shoot armbar to retain her title in a four-way match at Triplemanía XXV. Afterwards, several wrestlers voiced their opinions on the incident, including Joey Ryan who stated "we constantly put our health in each other's hands. If you violate that trust, you're not one of us". Sexy Star also lost bookings because of the incident with WrestleCade announcing they had removed her from an upcoming event. Cody Rhodes stated that she would never set foot into one of his locker rooms, while Road Dogg called for her to be blacklisted. On September 4, Sexy Star was stripped of the Reina de Reinas Championship.

=== Lucha Underground (2014–2016) ===
In August, Sexy Star was announced as one of five AAA wrestlers to star in the new El Rey program Lucha Underground, which premiered on October 29; her first match was against Son of Havoc. When Blue Demon Jr. was attacked post-match by Chavo Guerrero Jr. with a steel chair, Sexy Star came in to try and persuade Chavo to desist but was struck in the head by Chavo with the chair. Her storyline for Season One was her determination to get revenge on Chavo, and on the December 3 program she teamed with Fénix against Chavo and Pentagón Jr. in a tag team match that ended with Sexy Star getting the pin on Pentagón Jr. On April 1, 2015, Star participated in a tournament to crown the first LU Trios Champions. Sexy Star, Pentagón Jr. and Super Fly were defeated by Big Ryck, The Mack and Killshot. After the match, Pentagón tried to break Super Fly's arm, but Star saved him. On February 7, 2015, Sexy Star won her first mask, when she defeated Super Fly in a Mask vs. Mask Lucha de Apuestas. After the match, Pentagón Jr. attacked Star and broke Super Fly's arm. On April 22, 2015, Star defeated Pentagón Jr. On June 3, 2015, Star was defeated by Pentagon Jr. in a Submission match after Super Fly attacked her. On Ultima Lucha, broadcast on August 5, 2015, Sexy Star was one of seven "Aztec Medallion" holders who participated in a seven-way Battle Royal Match for the inaugural Lucha Underground Gift of the Gods Championship, but was unsuccessful in winning the match. At the end of Ultima Lucha she was shown to have been kidnapped by Marty "The Moth" Martinez as part of a storyline leading into Season Two. On January 31, 2016, at the second season Ultima Lucha, Sexy Star became the first female Gift of the Gods Champion. She lost the title to Johnny Mundo on March 19, 2016. On April 9, Sexy Star won the third Aztec Warfare match to become the first female Lucha Underground Champion. She also lost that title to Mundo the following day.

=== Shimmer Women Athletes (2016–2017) ===
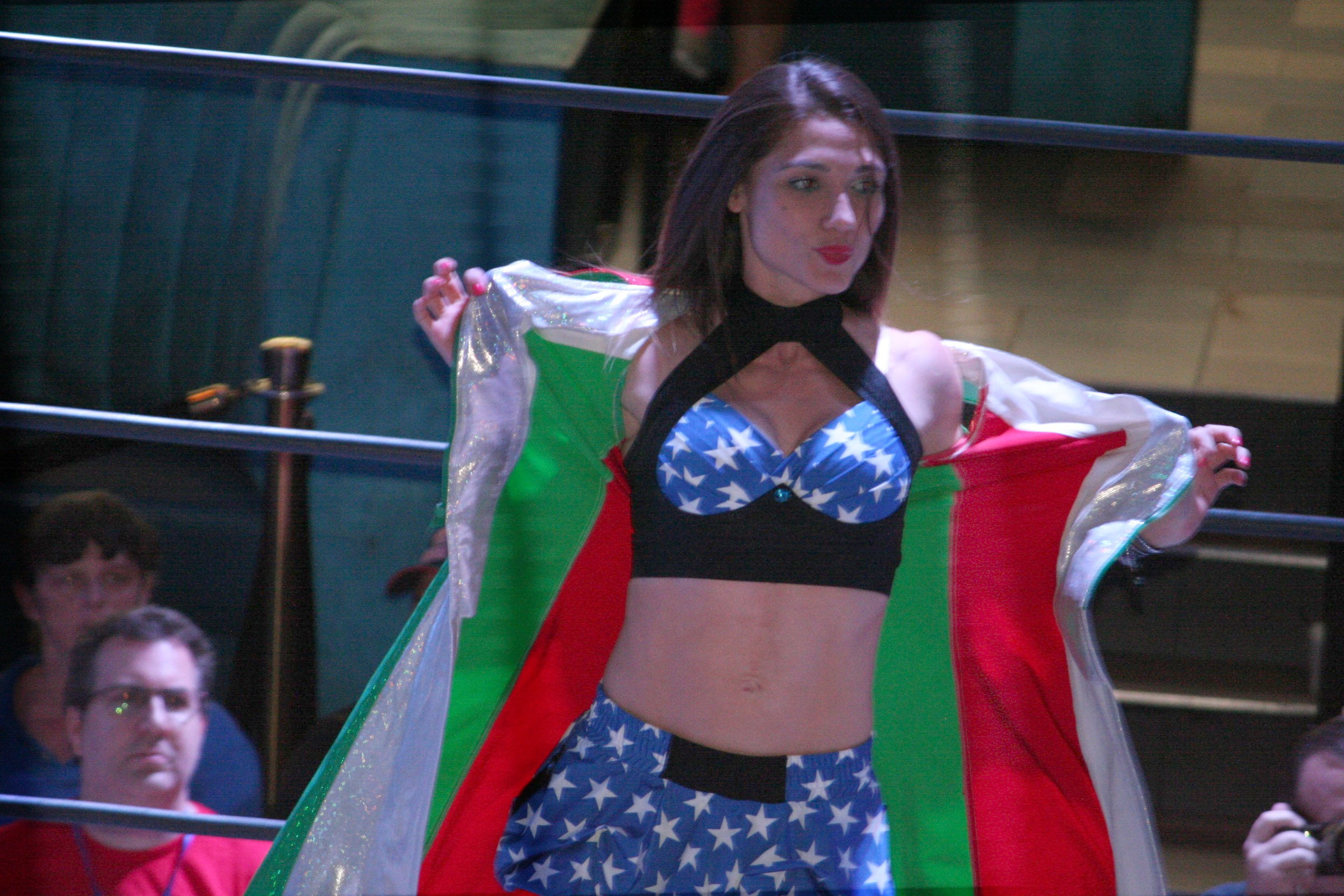
Known as a masked luchadora, García also wrestled unmasked as Dulce García

On November 12, 2016, García, working unmasked and under the name Dulce Garcia, made her debut for Shimmer Women Athletes, defeating LuFisto. The following day, she was defeated by Mercedes Martinez. On April 1, 2017, at Shimmer 91, she defeated Kellyanne in a singles match.

== Boxing career ==
On July 2, 2016, García unmasked herself at a boxing event in Mexico City and announced she was changing professions and becoming a professional boxer.

On April 22, 2017, Garcia was victorious on her boxing debut, defeating Yanely Ceja Hernandez at the fourth round in a unanimous decision.

Currently, Sexy Star has a record of 5–0.

== Mixed martial arts career ==
In March 2017, García showed her interest in pursuing a career in mixed martial arts and, ten months later, it was reported she was in conversations with the MMA promotion Combate Americas. On February 19, 2019, it was announced García signed with Combate Américas. She made her debut on April 12, defeating Mariana Ruiz. She won her second combat against Alina Lopez. On April 30, 2021, she lost her third combat against Claudia Díaz at Combate Global: Combate Latina.

== In other media ==
During the spring of 2010 Sexy Star appeared in an episode the National Geographic Channel show Tabú, a fact that was advertised on large billboards in Mexico City prior to the show airing on television.

In the fall of 2017, she began to do projects for Monterrey's Multimedios Televisión, including competing in the second cycle of the network's celebrity dance competition Bailadísimo for that year, and co-hosting the children's afternoon show Destardes.

== Personal life ==
García gave birth on August 5, 2013. García married boxer Jhonny González in June 2015.

== Championships and accomplishments ==
- AAA / Lucha Libre AAA Worldwide
  - AAA Reina de Reinas Championship (3 times)
  - AAA World Mixed Tag Team Championship (1 time) – with Pentagón Jr.
- Federacion Internacional de Lucha Libre
  - FILL Women's Championship (1 time)
  - FILL Mixed Tag Team Championship (1 time) – with Humberto Garza Jr.
- Kaoz Lucha Libre
  - Kaoz Women's Championship (1 time)
  - Kaoz Mixed Tag Team Championship (1 time) – with Fresero Jr.
  - Kaoz Women's Tag Team Championship (1 time) – with Black Widow
- Lucha Underground
  - Lucha Underground Championship (1 time)
  - Gift of the Gods Championship (1 time)
  - Aztec Warfare III
- Más Lucha
  - Suprema Más Lucha tournament (2020)
- Pro Wrestling Illustrated
  - Ranked No. 9 of the best 50 female singles wrestlers in the PWI Female 50 in 2016
- Robles Promotions
  - Robles Mixed Tag Team Championship (1 time, current) - with Doberman
- The Crash
  - The Crash Women's Championship (1 time)

== Luchas de Apuestas record ==
Winner (wager)	Loser (wager)	Location	Event	Date	Notes
Sexy Star (mask)	Faby Apache (hair)	Ciudad Madero, Tamaulipas	Guerra de Titanes	December 11, 2009	
Sexy Star (mask)	Pimpinela Escarlata (hair)	Zapopan, Jalisco	Rey de Reyes	March 18, 2012	(Note: Twelve-person steel cage match.)
Sexy Star (mask)	Super Fly (mask)	Los Angeles, California	LU "Mask vs Mask"	February 7, 2015	
Sexy Star (mask)	Veneno (mask)	Los Angeles, California	LU "The Cueto Cup"	August 23, 2017	(Note: Match never officially concluded due to Joey Ryan's interference and removal of Venino's mask to expose Cortez Castro.)

== Professional boxing record ==
5 fights	5 wins	0 losses
By knockout	1	0
By decision	4	0

No.	Result	Record	Opponent	Type	Round	Date	Location	Notes
5	Win	5–0	Karla Islas	UD	6	Aug 18, 2018	Bar La Wipa, Los Mochis, Mexico	
4	Win	4–0	Moni Trejo	TKO	6 (6)	Jun 9, 2018	Gimnasio Nuevo León Unido, Monterrey, Mexico	
3	Win	3–0	Esperanza Resendiz	MD	6	Mar 24, 2018	Lienzo Charro, Saltillo, Mexico	
2	Win	2–0	Guadalupe Coral	UD	4	Sep 30, 2017	Centro Regional de Deporte de Las Américas, Ecatepec, Mexico	
1	Win	1–0	Yanely Ceja Hernandez	UD	4	Apr 22, 2017	Unidad Deportiva Martín Alarcón, Metepec, Mexico	

== Mixed martial arts record ==
Professional record breakdown
3 matches	2 wins	1 loss
By knockout	0	1
By submission	1	0
By decision	1	0
No contests	0	

Res.	Record	Opponent	Method	Event	Date	Round	Time	Location	Notes
Lost	2–1	Claudia Diaz	TKO (Technical Knockout)	Combate Global: Combate Latina	April 30, 2021	2	3:27	Miami, United States	
Win	2–0	Anali Lopez	Submission (guillotine choke)	Combate Americas 51: Tito vs. Alberto	December 7, 2019	1	2:47	McAllen, United States	
Win	1–0	Mariana Ruíz	Decision (unanimous)	Combate Estrellas	April 12, 2019	3	5:00	Monterrey, Mexico	
