= Alan Stone (wrestler) =

Mexican professional wrestler (born 1977)

Personal information
- Born: May 23, 1977 (age 49) Mexico City, Mexico

Professional wrestling career
- Ring name(s): Alan Stone; Hollywood
- Billed height: 1.75 m (5 ft 9 in)
- Billed weight: 88 kg (194 lb)
- Trained by: Bello Greco; Super Caló
- Debut: 1996

Alan Stone (born May 23, 1977) is a Mexican professional wrestler who has competed in Lucha Libre AAA Worldwide and Consejo Mundial de Lucha Libre since the late 1990s. The son of luchador El Bello Greco, he is a second-generation wrestler along with his brothers Super Calo and Chris Stone with whom he teams with as Los Bellos Stones.

== Professional wrestling career ==
Alan Stone was born to Bello Greco in Mexico City, Mexico on May 23, 1977. He was trained by his father and brother Jordy Stone and made his debut for Lucha Libre AAA Worldwide in 1996 under the name Hollywood. Eventually hitting the independent circuit, including a brief stop in Promo Azteca where he took on the ringname Alan Stone, and feuded with his brother who was working as Motor Cross. Both men eventually got jobs working opening matches for Consejo Mundial de Lucha Libre.

=== Consejo Mundial de Lucha Libre (1998–2004) ===
They formed a regular undercard tag team for many years and were constantly praised for having impressive matches while being very charismatic performers. After winning the CMLL Arena Coliseo Tag Team Championship in November 2000, Moto Cross changed his name to Chris Stone on December 15, and the two became known as Los Hermanos Stone. This led to a tecnico turn as they feuded with veteran no-nonsense rudos like Guerrero Del Futuro, Mogur and Damian El Guerrero. The lack of upward mobility was clearly evident as the two seemed to destined to be stuck in segundas and terceras for years. Eventually, Chris had a falling-out with CMLL and left the promotion, allowing Alan Stone to be pushed as a singles wrestler in late 2003. On December 5, 2003, he teamed with Zumbido and Super Crazy losing to Safari, El Felino and Volador Jr. in a tournament final for the vacant Mexican National Trios Championship. Although winning the Guapos U competition and headlining an Arena Mexico show in late 2004, Alan left CMLL and returned to AAA where he soon became a rudo once again and feuded with El Intocable.

=== Lucha Libre AAA Worldwide (2004–present) ===
He fought his rival to a no-contest in a best-of-three falls match at the 2006 Rey de Reyes in Ciudad Madero, Mexico on March 10, 2006. The match ended in a double-countout after each man had scored one fall. In a "hair vs. hair" dog collar chain match with Scorpio, Jr., they defeated El Intocable and Brazo de Plata at the 2006 Guerra de Tintanes on December 8, 2006. As part of the pre-match stipulations, Brazo's head was shaved as the only man not to touch all six corners. The two were seemingly destined for a "hair vs. hair" match themselves but it never happened for various reasons. Instead, Alan focused on being part of Los Guapos until the group split in 2007. At the 2007 Rey de Reyes, he and Zumbido lost to Dark Cuervo and Dark Ozz in a match for the vacant AAA World Tag Team Championship in Naucalpan, Mexico. The match was a tournament final which also included Crazy Boy / Joe Líder and Pegasso / Super Fly in a 4-team elimination match. Later that year, he competed at the first Antonio Pena Memorial Show participating in a gauntlet match for the Antonio Pena Cup. He defeated Ron Killings and Scorpio, Jr. before being eliminated by Charley Manson. He ended up turning tecnico and teaming with his brothers Super Calo and Chris Stone as Los Bellos Stones. Since returning to the AAA, he has wrestled in semi-main events and the occasional main events. He came up just short of winning the 2008 Rey De Reyes after being eliminated by El Zorro in the finals. He and Chris Stone challenged and lost to AAA World Tag Champions Joe Líder and Nicho el Millonario in a "three-way" ladder match with Jack Evans and Teddy Hart at the 2008 Antonio Pena Memorial Show. At the 2009 Rey de Reyes in Guadalajara, he was eliminated in the opening rounds after being pinned by El Elegido. Stone defeated Joe Líder in the same match.

On July 25, 2010, Chris Stone turned rudo by turning on El Elegido during a match, where they teamed with Relampago against Dark Ozz, Dark Cuervo and Dark Escoria. He then went on to form La Milicia with Decnnis, Billy Boy, Black Abyss, Psicosis III and Tigre Cota. On August 6 Alan followed his brother's example by also turning on El Elegido and re-forming Los Bellos Stones in La Milicia. La Milicia then joined forces with La Legión Extranjera and Los Perros del Mal to form La Sociedad. On March 13, 2011, Stone teamed with Jennifer Blake to defeat Faby Apache and Pimpinela Escarlata for the AAA World Mixed Tag Team Championship. On February 10, 2012, Stone quit La Milicia and La Sociedad, after a disagreement with Konnan. After spending months off television, Stone returned to AAA on October 7 at Héroes Inmortales, where he and Jennifer Blake lost the AAA World Mixed Tag Team Championship to Halloween and Mari Apache in a four-way match, which also included the teams of Atomic Boy and Faby Apache, and Fénix and Lolita. Shortly afterwards, Stone parted ways with AAA.

Stone returned to AAA in April 2013, forming the Los Mirreyes stable with El Elegido and Toscano.

== Other media ==
Stone has appeared in the video game Lucha Libre AAA: Héroes del Ring.

== Championships and accomplishments ==
- Lucha Libre AAA Worldwide
  - AAA World Mixed Tag Team Championship (1 time) – with Jennifer Blake
- Consejo Mundial de Lucha Libre
  - CMLL Arena Coliseo Tag Team Championship (1 time) - with Chris Stone
  - Torneo Gran Alternativa: 2003 – with Villano IV
  - Guapos U winner (2004)
- Pro Wrestling Illustrated
  - PWI ranked him #78 of the 500 best singles wrestlers of the PWI 500 in 2008
- Other titles
  - Distrito Federal Trios Championship (1 time) - with Super Calo and Chris Stone

== Luchas de Apuestas record ==
Winner (wager)	Loser (wager)	Location	Event	Date	Notes
Alan Stone (hair)	Brazo de Platino (hair)	N/A	Live event	N/A	
Alan Stone (hair)	Damián el Guerrero (hair)	Mexico City	Live event	July 31, 2001	
Alan Stone (hair)	Guerrero del Futuro (hair)	Guadalajara, Jalisco	Live event	October 21, 2001	
Alan Stone (hair)	Brazo de Platino (hair)	Tehuacán, Puebla	Live event	July 31, 2004	(Note: a torneo cibernetico also involving Chris Stone, Impacto, Virus, Nosawa, Violencia & Zumbido)
Alan Stone and Zumbido (hair)	Loco Max and Mr. México (hair)	Mexico City	Live event	November 19, 2004	
Los Guapos (hair) (Alan Stone and Scorpio, Jr.)	El Intocable (hair) and Brazo de Plata (hair)	Ciudad Madero, Tamaulipas	Live event	December 8, 2006	(Note: This was a dog collar chain match. Despite being masked El Intotacble put his hair on the line for the match.)
Alan Stone (hair)	Scorpio, Jr. (hair)	Ciudad Madero, Tamaulipas	Guerra de Titanes	November 20, 2007	(Note: This was a steel cage match also involving Super Calo, El Intocable, Zumbido and Decnnis.)
