= Jennifer Blake (wrestler) =

Canadian professional wrestler (born 1983)

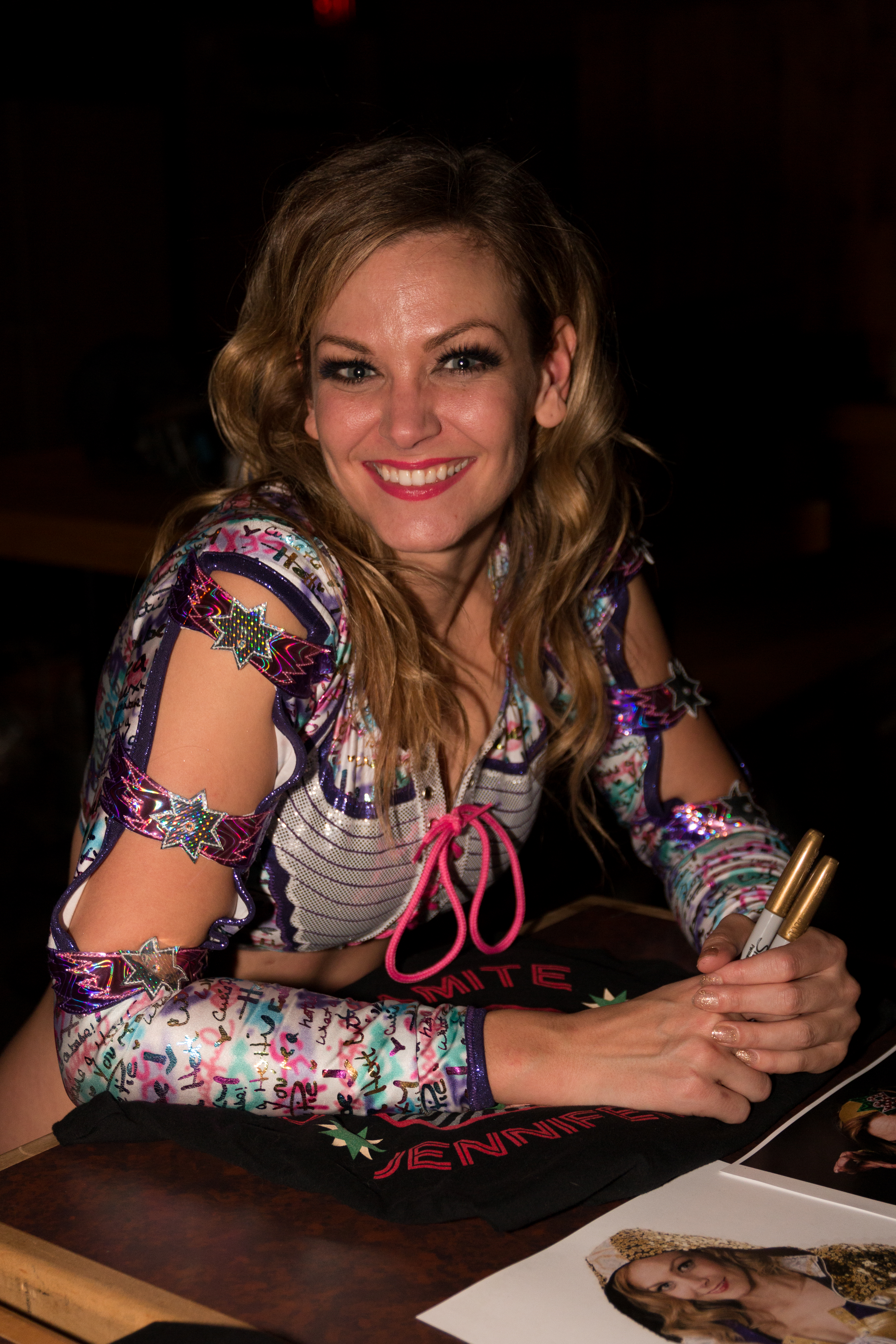
- Blake in November 2015

Personal information
- Born: Jennifer Ykema; September 16, 1983 (age 42) Niagara Falls, Ontario, Canada
- Spouse: Michael Burrough (m. 2018)

Professional wrestling career
- Ring name(s): Autumn Frost; Girl Dynamite; Jennifer Blade; Jennifer Blake; Jen Blake
- Billed height: 5 ft 7 in (1.70 m)
- Billed weight: 125 lb (57 kg)
- Billed from: Niagara Falls, Ontario; Anchorage, Alaska
- Trained by: Derek Wylde; Cody Deaner
- Debut: 2004 (as a ring announcer); May 2007 (as a wrestler)

Jennifer Ykema (born September 16, 1983) is a Canadian professional wrestler, better known by her ring name Jennifer Blake, and is often referred to by her nickname "Girl Dynamite". She is best known for her work in Lucha Libre AAA Worldwide in Mexico and Shimmer Women Athletes in the United States.

== Professional wrestling career ==
=== Debut and early years (2004–2007) ===
Blake made her first wrestling appearance in 2004 as a ring announcer. Following this, she transitioned into a managerial role and began acting as a valet for Derek Wylde and Cody Deaner, while receiving training from Deaner.

=== Shimmer Women Athletes (2008–2010) ===
Blake made her debut for Shimmer Women Athletes on April 26, 2008, where she teamed with Danyah to face the International Home Wrecking Crew (Rain and Jetta) in a losing effort. Later that night, Blake and Danyah were defeated by The Experience (Lexie Fyfe and Malia Hosaka). On Volume 19 on July 5, she made her debut in singles competition in a losing effort to Allison Danger. Later in that night on Volume 20, Blake and Danger lost to the Canadian NINJAs (Portia Perez and Nicole Matthews) in a tag team match. On October 19, she took part in a tag team tournament along with LuFisto. After eliminating the Canadian NINJAs, they were defeated by the International Home Wrecking Crew. Later in that night, she lost to Cheerleader Melissa in a singles match. On Volume 24 on May 2, 2009, Blake gained her first victory in singles competition by defeating Amber O'Neal. As part of Volume 25, she lost to Rain. Later in the night, as part of the Volume 26, she was defeated by Jessie McKay in a four–way match, which also included Kellie Skater and Melanie Cruise. She was scheduled for the 4th anniversary on November 8, 2009, but was unable to appear due to the possibility to receive more training in Mexico. She returned to the promotion on April 11, 2010, when she teamed with Allison Danger to defeat Melanie Cruise and Annie Social in a tag team match.

=== Wrestlicious (2009–2010) ===
In early 2009, Blake took part in the tapings of Jimmy Hart's Wrestlicious, where she appeared as "The Ice Princess" Autumn Frost. On the edition of March 10, 2010 of Takedown, she competed in her first match for the promotion, defeating Paige Webb. On March 24, 2010, edition of Takedown she appeared in JV's Crib segment with Toni the Top and JV Rich. On the edition of November 4, 2010 of Takedown, she competed in the "Hoedown Throwdown" Battle Royal, but was eliminated by Alexandra the Great.

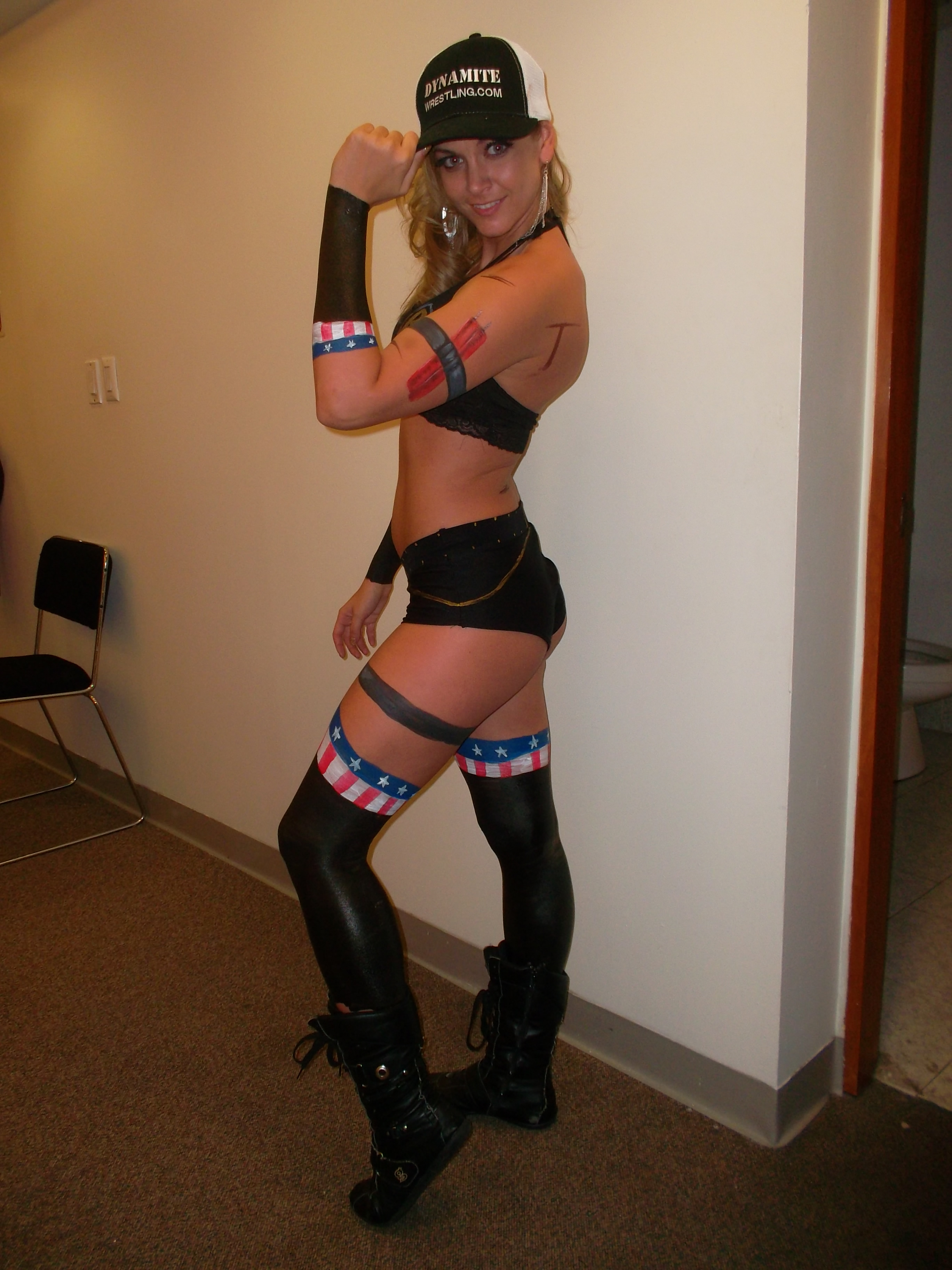
Blake in August 2012.

=== Lucha Libre AAA Worldwide (2009–2014) ===
In 2009, Blake branched out into Mexico, wrestling in the Extreme Air Wrestling (Lucha Libre Extrema Aérea, EAW) promotion. She made her debut on June 6, 2009 in Teziutlán, Puebla, teaming with Derrick Nikerson (Neikirk) in a losing effort against John Scott and Ericka del Rico. On June 20, she picked up her first victory by defeating Sensual Rain in San Juan de los Lagos, Jalisco. On August 21, 2009, at Verano de Escandalo she made her debut for Lucha Libre AAA Worldwide, initially using the ring name Jennifer Blade, before returning to her Jennifer Blake ring name. In the promotion she is part of the heel stable La Legión Extranjera, led by Konnan. At the 2010 Rey de Reyes show her Legión stable mates Rain, Christina Von Eerie and Sexy Star faced off against Cinthia Moreno, Mari and Faby Apache, a match which Moreno won for her team by pinning Sexy Star. During a post Rey de Reyes interview Sexy Star claimed that the Apaches and Cintia Moreno were nothing but maids, which led to AAA booking a match between Cinthia Moreno, Faby and Mari Apache against Sexy Star, Rain and Jennifer Blade in a Triplemanía XVIII match where the person pinned or submitted would have to be the winning team's slave for a month. At Triplemanía La Legión defeated Moreno and the Apaches, when Blade pinned Mari, thanks in part to the biased refereering by Hijo del Tirantes. Following the match Konnan ordered Mari Apache to begin her maid duty right away by cleaning up their dressing room. The stipulation expired on July 6, 2010. On August 14, 2010 at Verano de Escandalo Blake teamed up with Alan Stone, Mini Abismo Negro and Yuriko in a losing effort against Cynthia Moreno, El Elegido, Octagoncito and Pimpinela Escarlata in a Relevos Atómicos de locura match. On March 13, 2011, Blake and her La Sociedad stablemate Alan Stone defeated Faby Apache and Pimpinela Escarlata to win the AAA World Mixed Tag Team Championship. In June Blake began accompanying the members of La Maniarquía to counteract Nanyzh Rock, the valet of their rival Heavy Metal. On July 31 at Verano de Escándalo, Blake received her first shot at the AAA Reina de Reinas Championship in an eight-way elimination match, but was unable to win the title. After a seven month long hiatus from AAA, Blake returned to the promotion on July 27, 2012, when she teamed with Mari Apache in a tag team match, where they were defeated by Faby Apache and Lolita. On October 7 at Héroes Inmortales, Blake and Stone lost the AAA World Mixed Tag Team Championship to Halloween and Mari Apache in a four-way match, which also included the teams of Atomic Boy and Faby Apache, and Fénix and Lolita. On November 27, Blake made her Japanese debut, when she took part in the 2012 Reina de Reinas tournament co-produced by AAA and Pro Wrestling Wave in Tokyo's Korakuen Hall. Blake was eliminated from the tournament in her opening match by Sexy Star.

On February 3, 2013, Blake turned technica for the first time in AAA, when she was attacked after a match by Mari Apache and Taya, before being saved by Faby Apache, La Jarochita and Lolita. On March 1, Blake lost to her rival Taya in the first round of a tournament for the vacant AAA Reina de Reinas Championship, after interference from Mari Apache, Sexy Lady and Lufisto.

== Championships and accomplishments ==
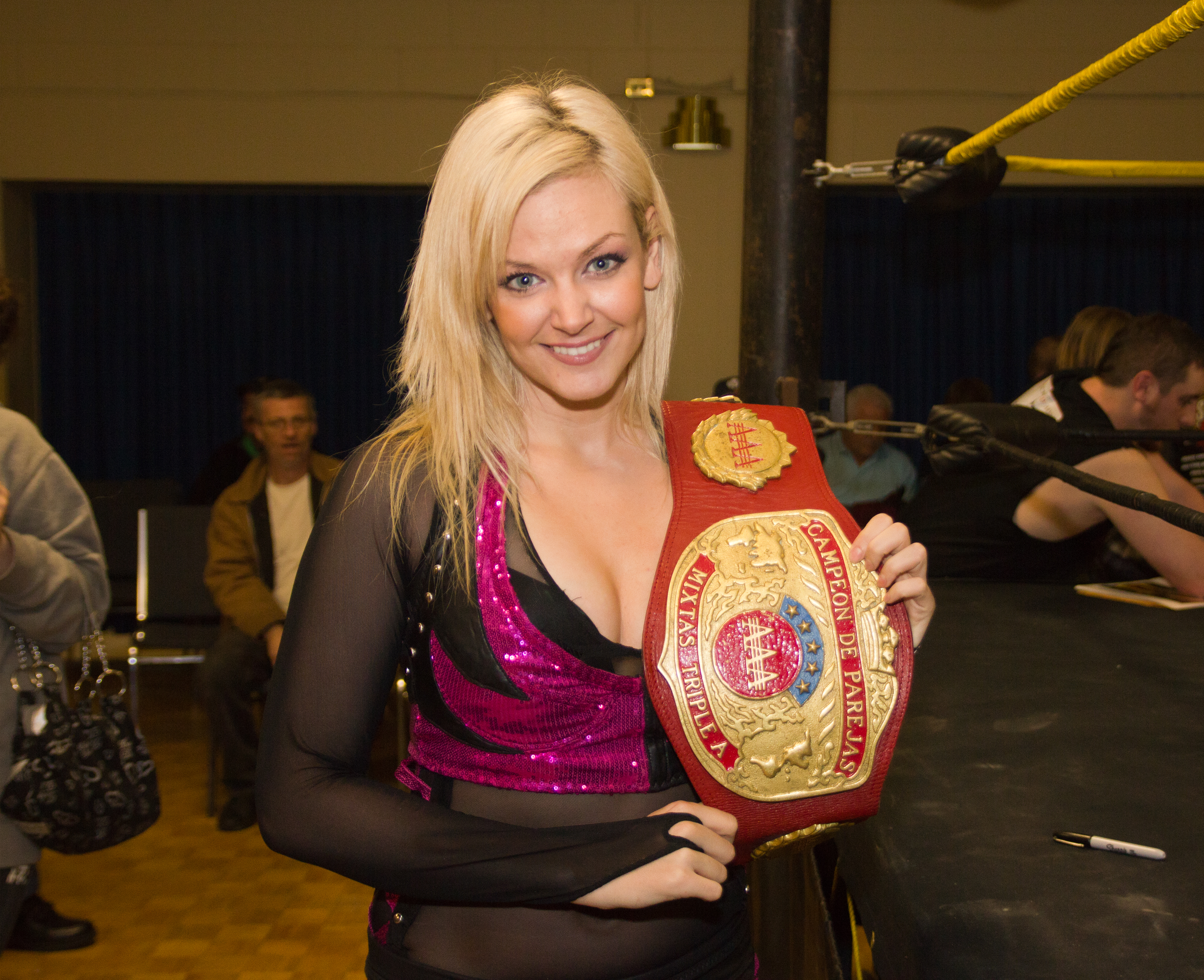
Blake as one half of the AAA World Mixed Tag Team Champions.

- Canadian Wrestling Federation
  - CWF Women's Championship (1 time)
- Lucha Libre AAA Worldwide
  - AAA World Mixed Tag Team Championship (1 time) – with Alan Stone
- Pro Wrestling Illustrated
  - Ranked No. 38 of the best 50 female singles wrestlers in the PWI Female 50 in 2009
