= Mascarita Sagrada (2007) =

Mexican professional wrestler

Professional wrestling career
- Ring name: Mascarita Sagrada (III)
- Billed height: 1.20 m (3 ft 11 in)
- Trained by: Indio Vitela
- Debut: 2000

Mascarita Sagrada is a Mexican professional wrestler who works for Lucha Libre AAA World Wide's (AAA) Mini-Estrella division. He is the third wrestler to work under the ring name "Mascarita Sagrada" for AAA, having used the name from 2007 to 2013. Mascarita Sagrada's real name is not a matter of public record, as is often the case with masked wrestlers in Mexico where their private lives are kept a secret from the wrestling fans. Working in the Mini division does not automatically mean that he has dwarfism as several short wrestlers work in the "Mini" division, although at 1.19 m (3 ft 11 in) in this case it is clear that the wrestler under the mask is a dwarf. His name and outfit is patterned after popular luchador Mascara Sagrada and the name "Mascarita Sagrada" is Spanish for "Little Sacred Mask".

== Professional wrestling career ==
The wrestler known as Mascarita Sagrada made his professional wrestling debut no later than in 2000 after having trained under Indio Vitela. It is not known what ring name he used prior to 2007, nor is it known if he worked for Lucha Libre AAA World Wide (AAA). In 2007 the wrestler that previously wrestled as Mascarita Sagrada decided to leave AAA, to work for rival Consejo Mundial de Lucha Libre (CMLL) under the name Mascarita Dorada. Following Mascarita Sagrada's departure AAA introduced a new Mascarita Sagrada, sometimes referred to as "Mascarita Sagrada 2007" in text, although never publicly announced as such. Since the new Mascarita Sagrada's true identity is not a matter of public knowledge it is not known what identity he previously wrestled before taking over the Mascarita Sagrada persona in 2007. He made his AAA debut at the first Antonio Peña Memorial Show on October 7, 2007, where he wrestled in an "AAA Special" Relevos Atómicos de locura match (Spanish for "Eight-man madness match") that featured two teams of four, each composed of a male wrestler, a female wrestler, an exótico wrestler, and a Mini-Estrella. He teamed with Super Fly (Male), Cinthia Moreno (Female) and Pimpinela Escarlata (exótico) only to lose to Billy Boy (male), Faby Apache (female), Cassandro (exótico) and Mini Abismo Negro (Mini).

In mid-2008 AAA decided to create the AAA World Mini-Estrellas Championship after the reigning Mexican National Mini-Estrellas Champion Mascarita Sagrada left AAA, taking the championship belt with him. The tournament to crown the first ever AAA World Mini-Estrellas Champion ran from July 20, 2009 until September 14, 2009 with the finals at the 2008 Verano de Escandalo event. Mascarita Sagrada defeated Mini Histeria in the first round, but lost to Mini Charly Manson in the semi-final on August 17, 2008. At the 2008 Antonio Peña Memorial show he once again wrestled in a Relevos Atómicos de locura match, teaming with Brazo de Plata (Male), Faby Apache (Female) and Pimpinela Escarlata (Exotico) to beat El Brazo (Male), Cinthia Moreno (Female), Mini Abismo Negro (Mini) and Polvo de Estrellas (Exotico). At the 2009 Guerra de Titanes show Mascarita Sagrada was one of nine Mini-Estrellas who competed in a battle royal for the AAA World Mini-Estrella Championship. Mascarita Sagrada was the third wrestler eliminated from the match by eventual winner Mini Abismo Negro. In May, 2010 AAA announced that they were planning to hold the first ever Mini-Estrellas Tables, Ladders, and Chairs match at Triplemanía XVIII where Mini Abismo Negro would defend the title against six challengers, including Mascarita Sagrada. At Triplemanía XVIII Octagóncito outlasted eight other wrestlers (La Parkita and Mini Chessman were late additions to the match) in the TLC match to become the new AAA Mini-Estrellas Champion. His last known match took place on November 29, 2013.

== A shared identity ==
This Mascarita Sagrada is the third wrestler to use that name, mask and outfit while others have used variations on the name. The following have at one time or another performed as Mascarita Sagrada besides the current one.

"Clone Name"	Also known as	Notes
Mascarita Sagrada	Mascarita Sagrada	The original Mascarita Sagrada. He still uses the name on the independent circuit as well as when he wrestles outside of Mexico.
Mascarita Sagrada, Jr.	Tzuki	Changed name in 2000 but has used the Mascarita Sagrada gimmick on indy shows until mid-2007.
Mascarita Sagrada 2000	Mascarita Dorada, El Torito	introduced by AAA after the original left the promotion. Dropped "2000" from his name after working for a few months. Changed name when he left AAA to work for CMLL.
Mascarita Sagrada, Jr. (II)	Novillerito	Used the gimmick in December 2005.
