= Rey de Reyes (2009) =

2009 Lucha Libre AAA World Wide event

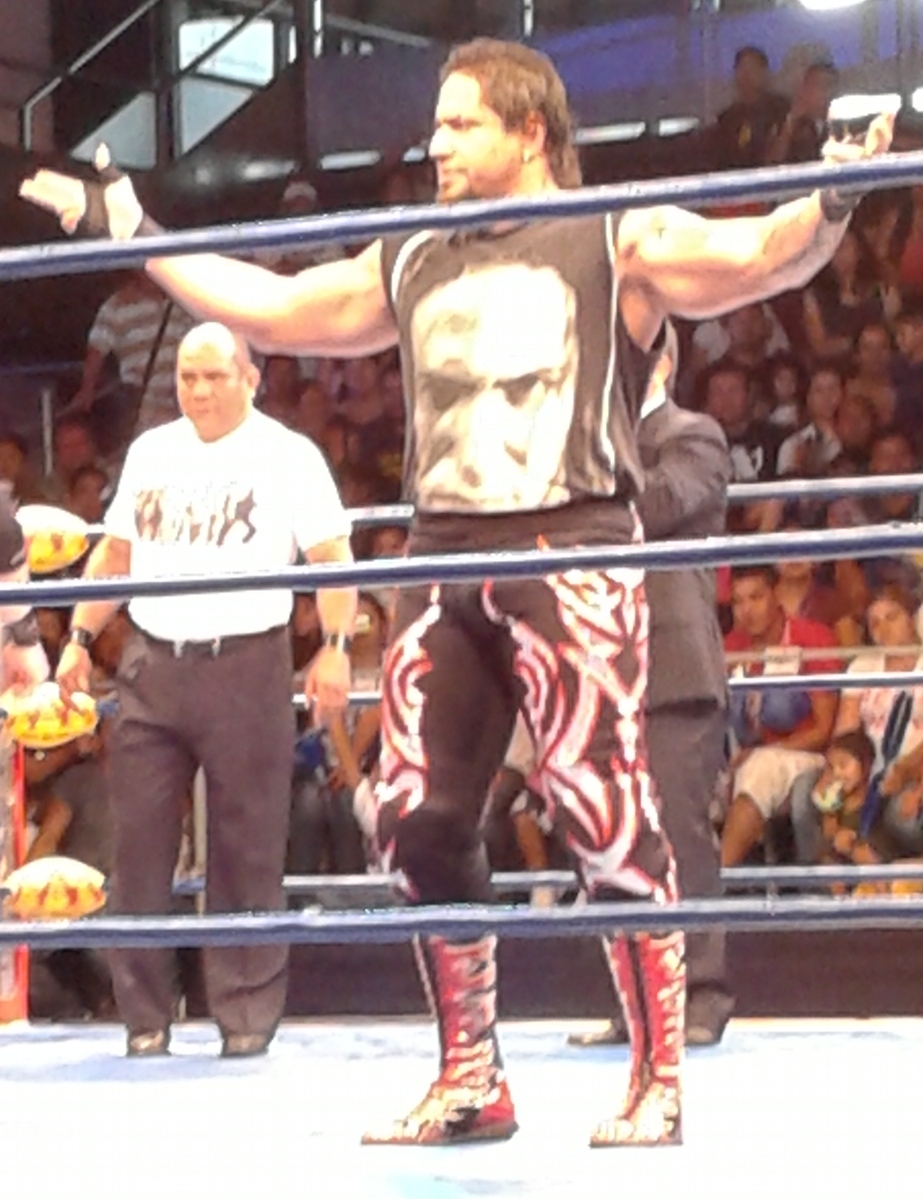
- El Mesias, defended the AAA Mega Championship in the main event
- Promotion: AAA
- Date: March 15, 2009
- City: Guadalajara, Jalisco, Mexico
- Venue: Plaza de Toros Nuevo Progreso
- Attendance: 15,000

Pay-per-view chronology
← Previous; Guerra de Titanes	Next → Triplemanía XVII

Rey de Reyes chronology
← Previous; 2008	Next → 2010

The Rey de Reyes 2009 (Spanish for "King of Kings") was a major annual professional wrestling show that also hosted that year's version of the Rey de Reyes tournament, produced by the Mexican wrestling promotion AAA. Rey de Reyes 2009 was a major professional wrestling event produced by AAA, which took place on March 15, 2009, at the Plaza de Toros Nuevo Progresso Bullfighting arena in Guadalajara, Jalisco, Mexico. The event was the 13th event produced under the Rey de Reyes name and also the 13th time that the Rey de Reyes tournament was held. Electroshock won the tournament, while El Mesias successfully defended the AAA Mega Championship against Chessman. The event also saw the surprise debuts of Marco Corleone and Dr. Wagner Jr. as well as the surprise return of Juventud Guerrera to the promotion.

== Production ==
=== Background ===
Starting in 1997 and every year since then the Mexican Lucha Libre, or professional wrestling, company AAA has held a Rey de Reyes (Spanish for "King of Kings') show in the spring. The 1997 version was held in February, while all subsequent Rey de Reyes shows were held in March. As part of their annual Rey de Reyes event AAA holds the eponymious Rey de Reyes tournament to determine that specific year's Rey. Most years the show hosts both the qualifying round and the final match, but on occasion the qualifying matches have been held prior to the event as part of AAA's weekly television shows. The traditional format consists of four preliminary rounds, each a Four-man elimination match with each of the four winners face off in the tournament finals, again under elimination rules. There have been years where AAA has employed a different format to determine a winner. The winner of the Rey de Reyes tournament is given a large ornamental sword to symbolize their victory, but is normally not guaranteed any other rewards for winning the tournament, although some years becoming the Rey de Reyes has earned the winner a match for the AAA Mega Championship. From 1999 through 2009 AAA also held an annual Reina de Reinas ("Queen of Queens") tournament, but later turned that into an actual championship that could be defended at any point during the year, abandoning the annual tournament concept. The 2009 show was the 13th Rey de Reyes show in the series.

=== Storylines ===
The Rey de Reyes show featured nine professional wrestling matches with different wrestlers involved in pre-existing, scripted feuds, plots, and storylines. Wrestlers were portrayed as either heels (referred to as rudos in Mexico, those that portray the "bad guys") or faces (técnicos in Mexico, the "good guy" characters) as they followed a series of tension-building events, which culminated in a wrestling match or series of matches.

The full list of participants in the "Rey de Reyes" tournament was announced over a couple of weeks leading up to the show. With 16 names it followed the traditional tournament format of qualifying rounds early in the evening and a 4-way elimination match as the final. the full announced list of participants announced were: Silver King, Alan Stone, Octagón, Super Fly, Black Abyss, Escoria, Abismo Negro, Electroshock, Joe Líder, Dark Ozz, Latin Lover, Nicho "El Millonario", El Elegido, La Parka, Psycho Clown, and Super Porky. Group one: Abismon Negro, Latin Lover, Dark Ozz and Black Abyss. Group two: El Elegido, Alan Stone, Silver King and Joe Líder. Group three: Octagón, Super Fly, Electroshock and Nicho "El Millonario". Group four: La Parka, Super Porky, Dark Escoria and Psycho Clown. In the days leading up to the event it was announced that Psycho Clown had been replaced by Kenzo Suzuki without any explanation.

Another match scheduled for the show was a match where Konnan would face off against a wrestler of Joaquin Roldan's choosing with the special Lucha de Apuestas ("Bet fight") wager being the hair of Joaquin Roldan against the hair of Konnan's associate Arturo Rivera. This match is a result of the very long running storyline between the AAA loyalists and Konnan's La Legión Extranjera (Foreign Legion). (Note: The storyline between the factions has been the main focus of the AAA promotion for over two years.) At the 2008 Antonio Peña Memorial show the storyline saw Konnan win the ownership of AAA from the Roldan family. Since winning the ownership several vignettes were aired showing Konnan and La Legión taking over the offices of AAA, further promoting the storyline that Konnan really was in charge of the federation. In the beginning of 2009 rumors of embesselment began to spread after AAA commentator wrote an article in the newspaper "Recórd" where he stated that former AAA owner Joaquin Rolando and AAA Chief Financial Officer Marisela Peña had requested that an American accountant firm audit the books of AAA. Upset with the allegations La Legión loyalist Arturo Rivera, AAA's other commentator, defended Konnan on air leading to Joaquin Roldano returning to the spotlight for the first time after losing control of the company in November, 2008. During Roldano's in-ring promo Arturo Rivera interrupted him and attacked him. After the two were pulled apart Rivera challenged Roldano to a hair vs. hair match where each picked a wrestler to represent themselves. Rivera picked Konnan to represent him. On February 26 it was announced that Joaquin Roldano had chosen AAA Commissioner Vampiro Canadienese to represent him in the match.

The next featured contest was a AAA Mega Championship match between champion El Mesias and challenger Chessman. The scripted feud started during a television taping where Chessman and El Mesias faced off in a wrestling match, the match got so out of hand that Chessman ended up being thrown over the side of the balcony and through a stack of tables. The show went to commercial with Chessman looking seriously injured as he received medical treatment. The following week another singles match between the two was scheduled but Chessman came out on crutches wearing a neck brace. Just as El Mesias though Chessman was going to announce that he was too injured to wrestle Chessman attacked him with a crutch revealing that the injury was nothing but a ruse to give Chessman an advantage as he quickly pinned the champion in their non-title match. At the final television taping before Rey de Reyes AAA "owner" Konnan changed a match that was supposed to see El Mesias team with Vampiro to take on Chessman and Konnan to a handicap match, stating that Vampiro was not allowed to wrestle that night and turned the match into a handicap match. After Chessman and Konnan won the match the rest of La Legión came to the ring to beat down El Mesias, teasing that Chessman may have joined La Legión Extranjera but not confirming it.

Another non-tournament match on the card was originally billed as "Radical Hell Brothers" and was supposed to feature Charly Manson and El Zorro facing off in a tag team partner where each wrestler had a "Surprise partner" that would not be announced until the time of the match. Charly Manson recently returned from an injury that forced him to sit out for 10 months and immediately came to the rescue of the AAA fan favorites when La Legión Extranjera attacked them. Three days later at another television taping Manson made his in ring return, teaming with Latin Lover and X-Pac to defeat Konnan, Electroshock and El Zorro. In the week before the show the booking of this match was changed so that instead of featuring surprise partners Charly Manson would team up with D-Generation-Mex members X-Pac and Alex Koslov, while El Zorro would team up with The Hart Foundation 2.0 (Teddy Hart and Jack Evans). It had originally been AAA's intent to have Cibernético return to the promotion and team up with Manson but when negotiations between the two parts broke down the scheduled match was changed.

== Results ==
No.	Results	Stipulations
1	Gran Apache, Faby Apache and Aero Star defeated Billy Boy, Cinthia Moreno and Tigre Cota	Six Person "Lucha Libre rules" tag team match
2	Latin Lover defeated Abismo Negro, Black Abyss and Dark Ozz; First elimination: Black Abyss eliminated Dark Ozz; Second elimination: Abismo Negro eliminated Black Abyss; Third elimination: Latin Lover eliminated Abismo Negro	Rey de Reyes 2009 Semifinal 4-Way Elimination match
3	Silver King defeated El Elegido, Alan Stone and Joe Líder; First elimination: Alan Stone eliminated Joe Líder; Second elimination: El Elegido eliminated Alan Stone; Third elimination: Silver King eliminated El Elegido	Rey de Reyes 2009 Semifinal 4-Way Elimination match
4	Electroshock defeated Octagón, Super Fly and Nicho "El Millonario"; First elimination: Octagón eliminated Nicho el Millonario; Second elimination: Electroshock eliminated Octagón; Third elimination: Electroshock eliminated Super Fly	Rey de Reyes 2009 Semifinal 4-Way Elimination match
5	La Parka defeated Brazo de Plata, Dark Escoria and Kenzo Suzuki; First elimination: La Parka eliminated Super Porky; Second elimination: La Parka eliminated Kenzo Suzuki; Third Elimination: La Parka eliminated Dark Escoria	Rey de Reyes 2009 Semifinal 4-Way Elimination match
6	El Zorro and The Hart Foundation 2.0 (Teddy Hart and Jack Evans) defeated Charly Manson and D-Generation-Mex (X-Pac and Alex Koslov)	Six-man "Lucha Libre rules" tag team match
7	Vampiro Canadienese defeated Konnan	Luchas de Apuestas, hair-vs.-hair match. the Hair of Arturo Rivera and Joaquin Roldan were on the line, as a result Arturo Rivera had his hair shaved off.
8	Electroshock defeated La Parka, Silver King and Latin Lover; First elimination: Silver King eliminated La Parka; Second elimination: Electroshock eliminated Silver King; Third Elimination: Electroshock eliminated Latin Lover	Rey de Reyes 2009 Final 4-Way Elimination match
9	El Mesias (c) defeated Chessman	Steel cage match for the AAA Mega Championship
(c) / – the champion(s) heading into the match

=== Tournament bracket ===
1st Round; Sin Limite: Rey de Reyes; March 15, 2009 (Aired March 22)
Abismo Negro	6:04
Black Abyss	—
Latin Lover	Win (Note: This was a four-way elimination match. Order of elimination: Black Abyss, Ozz, Abismo Negro)
Dark Ozz	—
Alan Stone	—
El Elegido	7:58
Joe Lider	—
Silver King	Win (Note: This was a four-way elimination match. Order of elimination: Joe Lider, Alan Stone, El Elegido)
Electroshock	Win (Note: This was a four-way elimination match. Order of elimination: Nicho el Millonario, Octagón, Super Fly)
Nicho el Millonario	—
Octagón	—
Super Fly	6:11
Escoria	—
Kenzo Suzuki	7:57
La Parka	Win (Note: This was a four-way elimination match. Order of elimination: Super Porky, Escoria, Kenzo Suzuki)
Super Porky	—

Final; Sin Limite: Rey de Reyes; March 15, 2009 (Aired March 29)
Latin Lover	—
Silver King	—
Electroshock	Win (Note: This was a four-way elimination match. Order of elimination: La Parka due to injury, Silver King by disqualification, Latin Lover)
La Parka	—
