= La Legión Extranjera =

Professional wrestling group

The Foreign Legion La Legión Extranjera
- The logo of La Legión Extranjera

Stable
- Members: Konnan (co-leader); Dorian Roldan (co-leader); Chessman; El Hijo del Tirantes; Jeff Jarrett; Sexy Star; Abyss; Alex Koslov; Arturo Rivera; Ayako Hamada; Black Abyss; Carlito Caribbean Cool; Christina Von Eerie; Christopher Daniels; Dark Cuervo; Dark Escoria; Dark Espiritu; Dark Ozz; Electroshock; Headhunter A Hernandez; El Mesias; El Ilegal; Jack Evans; Jennifer Blake; Joe Líder; Kenzo Suzuki; Konan Big; Mickie James; Nicho el Millonario; Nicole (valet); Psicosis II; Rain; Rocky Romero; Ron Killings; Samoa Joe; Sabu; Silver King; Taiji Ishimori; Takeshi Morishima; Teddy Hart; X-Pac; El Zorro; Others
- Debut: 2004
- Disbanded: 2010

La Legión Extranjera (Spanish for "The Foreign Legion") was the main Asistencia, Asesoría y Administración heel group, though loosely affiliated. It was a catch all for one time and irregularly scheduled foreign heels, working as Konnan's hired guns as well as a number of AAA regular Rudos (bad guys). This allowed AAA to advertise matches where La Legión Extranjera is scheduled, without announcing the specific participants before the show.

La Legión Extranjera's leader was Konnan. At the end of 2006, he was put out of action by Cibernético (giving him time to take care of health issues.) Nicho el Millonario debuted in 2007 as the replacement leader, getting revenge for Konnan while he was recovering.

During the period Konnan worked for Total Nonstop Action Wrestling, many TNA wrestlers appeared in AAA as both members of La Legión Extranjera and as representing their promotions. Since he left TNA no contracted TNA wrestlers have worked for La Legión Extranjera. After being defeated in the main event of Triplemania XVII Legión Extrangera lost control of AAA and Konnan was suspended from Mexican wrestling for an indefinite time. At this time Legion Extrangera was dissolved leaving only Electroshock, Chessman and Kenzo Suzuki. Electroshock joined up with Silver King and Dr. Wagner, Jr. to form La Wagnermania while Kenzo Suzuki would form La Yakuza with El Orientál and Sugi San/Yoshitsune.

On August 21, 2009, Konnan returned with a new Legion, built around Teddy Hart, Nicole, Roxxi, Rain and Jennifer Blade. They were later joined by Alex Koslov and El Zorro, who returned to the stable after turning on them in the main event of TripleMania XVII. In March 2010 Dorian Roldan turned on his father, AAA president Joaquin Roldan, and became the new co-leader of La Legión Extranjera. In July 2010 Decnnis started a new sub-group called La Milicia (the militia) within the Legion, consisting of himself, Alan Stone, Chris Stone, Black Abyss, Psicosis II, Tigre Cota and Billy Boy. Both groups then became a part of Dorian Roldan's La Sociedad, along with Los Maniacos and Los Perros del Mal.

== Guest members ==
Over the years La Legión has been used as the storyline reason for foreign wrestlers competing for AAA, even if just for one or two appearances. Besides Konnan and Nicho, only Kenzo Suzuki and Headhunter A were regulars early in 2007. Both X-Pac and Ron Killings became regulars with the unit (and promotion) in mid-2007, and Sabu frequently appeared with them as well.

- A.J. Styles
- Angel Williams/Angelina Love
- Antifaz Del Norte
- Black Búfalo
- Black Magic
- Black Pearl
- Bobby Lashley
- Bryan Danielson
- Christy Hemme
- D'Angelo Dinero
- Elix Skipper
- El Padrino
- Frankie Kazarian
- Gran Hamada
- Gunner
- Headhunter B
- Histeria
- Homicide
- Jennifer Blake
- Josh Raymond
- Lance Hoyt
- Lorelei Lee
- Low Ki
- Magnus
- Mike Modest
- Mickie James
- Mr. Anderson
- Mr. Niebla
- Rellik
- Rhino
- Rikishi
- Rob Terry
- Rob Van Dam
- Roxxi
- Scott D'Amore
- Scott Steiner
- Sexy Star
- Shawn Daivari
- Tiana Ringer
- Traci Brooks
- Scott Hall
- Velvet Sky

== Championships and accomplishments ==
- AAA / Lucha Libre AAA Worldwide
  - AAA Reina de Reinas Championship (1 time) – Sexy Star
  - AAA Mega Championship (2 times) – El Zorro (1) and Jeff Jarrett (1)
  - AAA World Mixed Tag Team Championship (1 time) – Alex Koslov and Christina Von Eerie
  - AAA World Tag Team Championship (2 times) – Takeshi Morishima and Taiji Ishimori (1), and Abyss and Chessman (1)
  - Reina de Reinas (2012) – Sexy Star
  - Rey de Reyes (3 times) – El Zorro (2008), Electroshock (2009), and Chessman (2010)
