= El Elegido =

Mexican professional wrestler

Personal information
- Born: November 23, 1975 (age 50) Monterrey, Mexico

Professional wrestling career
- Ring name(s): El Elegido; Corazon Latino
- Billed height: 1.81 m (5 ft 11 1/2 in)
- Billed weight: 101 kg (223 lb)
- Trained by: Fray Tormenta; Super Lince; Zulu
- Debut: March 20, 2006

El Elegido (born November 23, 1975) is a Mexican professional wrestler. Elegido is best known for his appearances with the Mexican promotion AAA, where he has worked primarily as a tecnico (a face, or those that portray the "good guys") and for a while as a member of the rudo (Heel, those that portray the "bad guys") stable Los Mirreyes alongside Alan Stone and Toscano. He has also worked for International Wrestling Revolution Group and smaller independent groups.

In 2007, Elegido was among several professional wrestlers that represented AAA in an inter-promotional show with Pro Wrestling Noah at the Differ Ariake Arena.

He is known for his entrances consisting of him somersaulting from all four ring corners after raising both arms in the air at each corner. His gear consists of a black mask with a Celtic cross on the forehead of the mask, and black trunks. His ring name is Spanish for "The Chosen One"

== Professional wrestling career ==
Elegido debuted on March 20, 2006. He became a regular with AAA that year.

He often teamed with El Intocable, who had a similar gimmick and often competed against various members of Los Guapos VIP.

On July 15, 2007, he competed in his first Triplemanía at Triplemanía XV, picking up the win in a trios against Los Guapos VIP.

On March 15, 2009, he was defeated in the semifinals of the Rey de Reyes tournament. In 2009, he also teamed with Gronda II in Gronda's short feud against the original "Gronda", Groon XXX.

On October 1, 2010, he competed in a Torneo cibernetico match with the stipulation that he would lose his mask if he was final person pinned. While he did get pinned, he was able to escape the match with his mask intact.

As of February 2017, despite competing in AAA for over 10 years, he has yet to win any AAA titles.

He competed at Rey de Reyes (2017) for the Rey de Reyes sword. the also match also included La Parka, Argenis, Averno, Pimpinela Escarlata, Niño Hamburguesa, Joe Líder, Chessman, which Argenis won.

== Championships and accomplishments ==
- Pro Wrestling Illustrated
  - PWI ranked him #170 of the 500 best singles wrestlers of the PWI 500 in 2009

== Luchas de Apuestas record ==
Winner (wager)	Loser (wager)	Location	Event	Date	Notes
El Elegido (hair)	El Brazo (hair)	Orizaba, Veracruz	Guerra de Titanes	December 6, 2008	(Note: This was a multi-man Steel Cage match that also included Super Porky, Electroshock, Super Fly and Pirata Morgan. The last man in the cage had his head shaved.)
