= Triplemanía XV =

2007 Lucha Libre AAA World Wide event

- The official Triplemanía XV logo
- Promotion: AAA
- Date: July 15, 2007
- City: Naucalpan, Mexico
- Venue: El Toreo
- Attendance: 19,000

Pay-per-view chronology
← Previous; Rey de Reyes	Next → TripleSEM

Triplemanía chronology
← Previous; XIV	Next → XVI

Triplemanía XV was the fifteenth Triplemanía professional wrestling show promoted by AAA. The show took place on July 15, 2007 in Naucalpan, Mexico like the previous year’s event. The Main event featured a Domo De La Muerte cage match (also known as a "Thundercage" match) where the last person in the cage would have his hair shaved off. The match featured the teams of Los Hell Brothers (Charly Manson, Chessman, and Cibernético) and La Legión Extranjera (El Mesías, Sean Waltman, and Kenzo Suzuki).

== Production ==
=== Background ===
In early 1992, Antonio Peña was working as a booker and storyline writer for Consejo Mundial de Lucha Libre (CMLL), Mexico's largest and the world's oldest wrestling promotion, and was frustrated by CMLL's very conservative approach to professional wrestling, specifically the style of wrestling known as Lucha Libre (Spanish for "freestyle wrestling"). He joined forces with a number of younger, very talented wrestlers who felt like CMLL was not giving them the recognition they deserved and decided to split from CMLL to create Asistencia Asesoría y Administración, later known simply as "AAA" or Triple A. After making a deal with the Televisa television network AAA held their first show in April 1992. The following year Peña and AAA held their first Triplemanía event, building it into an annual event that would become AAA's Super Bowl event, similar to the WWE's WrestleMania being the biggest show of the year. The 2007 Triplemanía was the 15th year in a row AAA held a Triplemanía show and the 20th overall show under the Triplemanía banner.

Hulk Hogan and Paul Wight (AKA The Big Show) were both courted for this show, to be on opposite sides of the 8-man tag team match. However, Hogan ultimately refused to sign on, so they were replaced with Rikishi Phatu and "The Animal".

=== Storylines ===
The Triplemanía XV show featured eight professional wrestling matches with different wrestlers involved in pre-existing scripted feuds, plots and storylines. Wrestlers were portrayed as either heels (referred to as rudos in Mexico, those that portray the "bad guys") or faces (técnicos in Mexico, the "good guy" characters) as they followed a series of tension-building events, which culminated in a wrestling match or series of matches.

== Results ==
No.	Results	Stipulations
1	Alfa, Faby Apache, Mini Abismo Negro, and Cassandro defeated El Oriental, Cinthia Moreno, Octagóncito, and Pimpinela Escarlata	Relevos Atómicos de Locura match
2	The Mexican Powers (Crazy Boy and Joe Líder) defeated the Black Family (Dark Cuervo and Dark Ozz (c)	Tag team match for the AAA World Tag Team Championship
3	Juventud Guerrera defeated Fuerza Guerrera	Street Fight
4	Laredo Kid and Gran Apache defeated Super Fly and Super Caló	Relevos Suicidas tag team match
5	Super Fly defeated Super Caló	Lucha de Apuestas, "Mask vs. Mask" match
6	El Alebrije, Brazo de Plata and El Elegido defeated Los Guapos VIP (Alan Stone, Scorpio Jr. and Zumbido) by disqualification.	Six-man "Lucha Libre rules" tag team match
7	La Legión Extranjera (Head Hunter I, Ron Killings, Rikishi Phatu and Sabu) defeated The Animal, Latin Lover, La Parka and El Zorro	Eight-mans "Atómicos" tag team match
8	Los Hell Brothers (Charly Manson, Chessman, and Cibernético) defeated La Legión Extranjera (El Mesías, Sean Waltman, and Kenzo Suzuki)	Domo De La Muerte cage match. Kenzo Susuki was the last person in the cage and had his head shaved due to his loss.
(c) / – the champion(s) heading into the match
