= Super Fly (wrestler) =

Mexican luchador (born 1987)

Personal information
- Born: Erick Aguilar Muñoz; February 24, 1987 (age 39) Puebla, Puebla, Mexico

Professional wrestling career
- Ring name(s): Super Fly; TBA (Note: Super Fly originally did not wrestle under the name "Super Fly", but employed an unknown ring name, and Super Fly has never stated what his previous ring name was.)
- Billed height: 1.68 m (5 ft 6 in)
- Billed weight: 82 kg (181 lb)
- Trained by: Skayde; Psicosis
- Debut: May 1, 2001

Erick Aguilar Muñoz (born February 24, 1987) is a Mexican luchador (professional wrestler) better known by the ring name Super Fly. He worked for the Mexican professional wrestling promotion Lucha Libre AAA Worldwide (AAA) since 2005 until 2021. Super Fly is best known as a tecnico (the Spanish term for a "good guy" or "Face" character in wrestling) and the co-leader of the AAA wrestling group Real Fuerza Aérea, but after turning rudo (the Spanish term for a "bad guy" or "heel" character in wrestling) and joined the group La Milicia and its umbrella group La Sociedad. Super Fly is the son of luchador El Seminarista, not to be confused with one of his trainers, Skayde, who has also wrestled under the same ring name.

== Professional wrestling career ==
The wrestler who would later be known as Super Fly was born on February 24, 1987, the son of Mexican Luchador El Seminarista (Spanish for the Seminarist or Seminarian) and grew up wanting to be a professional wrestler like his father. Through his fathers contacts the future Super Fly was trained by highly renowned Mexican wrestling trainer Skayde and by Psicosis before making his debut at just 14 years of age. He originally did not wrestle under the name "Super Fly" but employed an unknown ring name and for the first couple of years. (Note: The true name of most masked luchadors is not known, and Super Fly has never himself stated what his previous ring name was.) On February 11, 2003 Super Fly won his first ever Lucha de Apuestas (bet match) winning the mask of Perverso. in 2005 he adopted the ring name "Super Fly", a name that he has used ever since.

=== Lucha Libre AAA Worldwide ===
==== Real Fuerza Aérea ====
In 2005 he signed a contract with Lucha Libre AAA Worldwide (AAA), one of Mexico's two largest promotions. In 2006 he became one of the founding members of a group called Real Fuerza Aérea (Spanish for "Royal Air Force") alongside Laredo Kid and Nemesis. The group made their debut at the 2006 Rey de Reyes losing to the team known as Los Diabolicos (Ángel Mortal, Mr. Condor and Marabunta). Real Fuerza Aérea soon expanded with several other young, high flying tecnico wrestlers such as Aero Star, Pegasso and Rey Cometa. Real Fuerza Area (Super Fly, Rey Cometa, Laredo Kid, and Nemesis) challenged the Black Family (Dark Ozz, Dark Espiritu, Dark Cuervo and Dark Escoria for the Mexican National Atómicos Championship at Triplemanía XIV, but the match ended in a no-contest. As a result of the match the Atómicos title was held up, but the Black Family won the rematch the following month.

Together with Pegasso, Super Fly qualified for the finals of a tournament to crown the first AAA World Tag Team Champions at the 2007 Rey de Reyes show. The match was a four corners elimination match that also included Guapos VIP (Alan Stone and Zumbido), The Mexican Powers (Crazy Boy and Joe Líder) and winners The Black Family (Dark Cuervo and Dark Ozz). At Triplemanía XV, on July 15, 2007, Super Fly teamed up with Super Caló to wrestle Laredo Kid and Gran Apache in a Suicida Incredible match where the losing team would have to wrestled each other with their mask on the line. Laredo Kid and Apache won the match, forcing Super Fly and Super Caló to wrestle each other that same night. Super Fly won, unmasking Super Caló after the match in what was Super Fly's biggest Apuesta win to date. Two weeks later Super Fly was one of eight wrestlers who participated in the first ever Alas de Oro, while Super Fly managed to eliminate both Pegasso and Aero Star he was unable to overcome Extreme Tiger in the final moments of the match and lost. On September 3, 2009 Super Fly and Laredo Kid defeated the Japanese duo of Atsushi Aoki and Ippei Ota on the AAA/Pro Wrestling Noah co-promoted TripleSEM event that took place in Tokyo, Japan. At the 2007 Antonio Peña Memorial Show Real Fuerza Aérea leader Laredo Kid suffered a serious injury when he broke his leg during a match, because of this injury Super Fly was suddenly promoted to co-leader of Real Fuerza Aérea. On March 3, 2008 Super Fly qualified for the 2008 Rey de Reyes tournament when he and Billy Boy defeated Los Vipers Revolution (Antifaz and Histeria) and Los Bellos Stone (Chris Stone and Super Caló). He did not make it past the opening round of the tournament as he was eliminated by eventual tournament winner El Zorro. At Triplemanía XVI Super Fly, Aero Star, and El Ángel lost to the Black Family (Dark Ozz, Dark Cuervo and Dark Escoria in a six-man tag team match. Super Fly also participated in the 2008 Alas de Oro tournament but was the sixth man eliminated, by Jack Evans.

Following Triplemanía XVI and the Alas de Oro tournament Super Fly became involved in a long running storyline between AAA loyalists and La Legión Extranjera after turning down an offer to join La Legión. The storyline saw Super Fly team less with his Real Fuerza Aérea team mates and more with the "AAA Loyalist" group such as La Parka, Chessman and Cibernético. At the 2008 Antonio Peña Memorial Show Super Fly along with La Parka, Octagón and Latin Lover represented AAA in a Doma de la Muerte Steel cage elimination match. The team lost to the La Legión team of Electroshock, Konnan, Rellik and Kenzo Suzuki in a match where the possession of the (in storyline terms) urn with founder Antonio Peña's ashes. Following that match Super Fly began focusing mainly on Electroshock instead of the entire La Legion, facing him in a cage match at the 2008 Guerra de Titanes event, the match also included Pirata Morgan, El Brazo, Brazo de Plata and El Elegido. Neither Super Fly nor Electroshock were involved in the finish that saw El Brazo lose the match. At the 2009 Rey de Reyes Electroshock eliminated Super Fly in the opening round, effectively ending the storyline between the two. After the storyline with Electroshock ended Super Fly returned to teaming regularly with the other members of Real Fuerza Aérea. Signs of dissension between Super Fly and the other members of the group began to show when Laredo Kid defeated Super Fly in the first round of the AAA Cruiserweight Championship. At Triplemania XVII Super Fly, Laredo Kid and Aero Star lost to Los Psycho Circus (Psycho Clown, Killer Clown and Zombie Clown), during the match Super Fly appeared to be injured by Los Psycho Circus but later on in the night appeared to be fine, leading to further signs that not all was well in Real Fuerza Aérea. Over the summer Super Fly lashed out against his team mates after losing matches, but never fully turned Rudo ("bad guy" or heel) on his team mates. In late 2009 Super Fly and the other members of Real Fuerza Aérea, especially Laredo Kid seemingly settled their issues amicably ending the storyline for the moment.

==== La Milicia ====
After over a year of on and off teasing, Super Fly finally turned rudo on November 28, 2010, when he, along with members of La Milicia, attacked Aero Star and Octagón, revealing himself as the man who had attacked and bloodied Octagón prior to Héroes Inmortales IV. With his turn, Super Fly left Real Fuerza Aérea and joined both La Milicia and its umbrella group La Sociedad. On December 5 at Guerra de Titanes Super Fly pinned Octagón in a six man tag team match, where he teamed with his Milicia stable mates Alan Stone and Chris Stone against Octagón, Aero Star and El Elegido. On March 21, 2011, La Sociedad leader Konnan, disappointed with the performance of La Milicia, demoted its leader Decnnis and named Super Fly his replacement. After embarking on a long losing streak, Super Fly was stripped of La Milicia's leadership on November 5 with Konnan naming the recently turned Octagón as his replacement. As his first act as the leader of La Milicia, Octagón had the rest of the group turn on Super Fly and kick him out of the group.

==== Unmasking ====
Super Fly re-emerged as a tecnico at the November 26 tapings, and re-joined Real Fuerza Aérea on March 11, 2012. Real Fuerza Aérea eventually disbanded and Super Fly re-ignited his rivalry with Aero Star, which culminated on December 7, 2014, at Guerra de Titanes, where Super Fly was defeated in a Lucha de Apuestas and forced to unmask. 3 years later at Rey de Reyes in 2017 Super Fly lost to Aerostar in a Mask versus Hair forcing him to have his head shaved. On December 4, 2021, Super Fly announced his departure from AAA.

=== Lucha Underground (2014–2015) ===
Super Fly, masked once more, debuted on Lucha Underground on the December 10, 2014 broadcast in a match against King Cuerno. On February 7, 2015, Super Fly lost his mask for the second time in a Mask vs. Mask Lucha de Apuestas against Sexy Star. After the match, Pentagon Jr. broke his arm (Kayfabe). On June 3, 2015, Super Fly made his return and turned heel attacking Sexy Star in a submission match against Pentagon Jr.

== Championships and accomplishments ==
- Lucha Libre AAA Worldwide
  - AAA World Trios Championship (1 time) – with Averno and Chessman
- Pro Wrestling Illustrated
  - PWI ranked him #398 of the top 500 singles wrestlers in the PWI 500 in 2015

== Luchas de Apuestas record ==
Winner (wager)	Loser (wager)	Location	Event	Date	Notes
(Super Fly) (Note: The name under which Super Fly competed in the match is not known.) (mask)	Perverso (mask)	N/A	Live event	February 11, 2003	
Super Fly (mask)	Super Caló (mask)	Mexico City	Triplemanía XV	July 14, 2007	(Note: Relevos suicida match: Lost to Laredo Kid and Gran Apache.)
Aero Star (mask)	Super Fly (mask)	Zapopan, Jalisco	Guerra de Titanes	December 7, 2014	
Super Fly (hair)	Cerebro Negro (hair)	Naucalpan, State of Mexico	IWRG show	March 4, 2014	(Note: Steel cage match, also involving Apolo Estrada Jr., Argenis, Electro Boy, Eterno, Golden Magic, Machine Rocker, Mamba, Niño Hamburguesa, Universo 2000 Jr. and Venum.)
Sexy Star (mask)	Super Fly (mask)	Los Ángeles, California	Lucha Underground	February 7, 2015	
Aero Star (mask)	Super Fly (hair)	Monterrey, Nuevo León	Rey de Reyes	March 19, 2017	
Los OGTs (hairs) (Averno, Chessman and Super Fly)	El Nuevo Poder del Norte (hairs) (Carta Brava Jr., Mocho Cota Jr. and Tito Santana)	Monterrey, Nuevo León	Verano de Escándalo	June 3, 2018	
