= Abismo Negro =

Mexican professional wrestler (1971–2009)

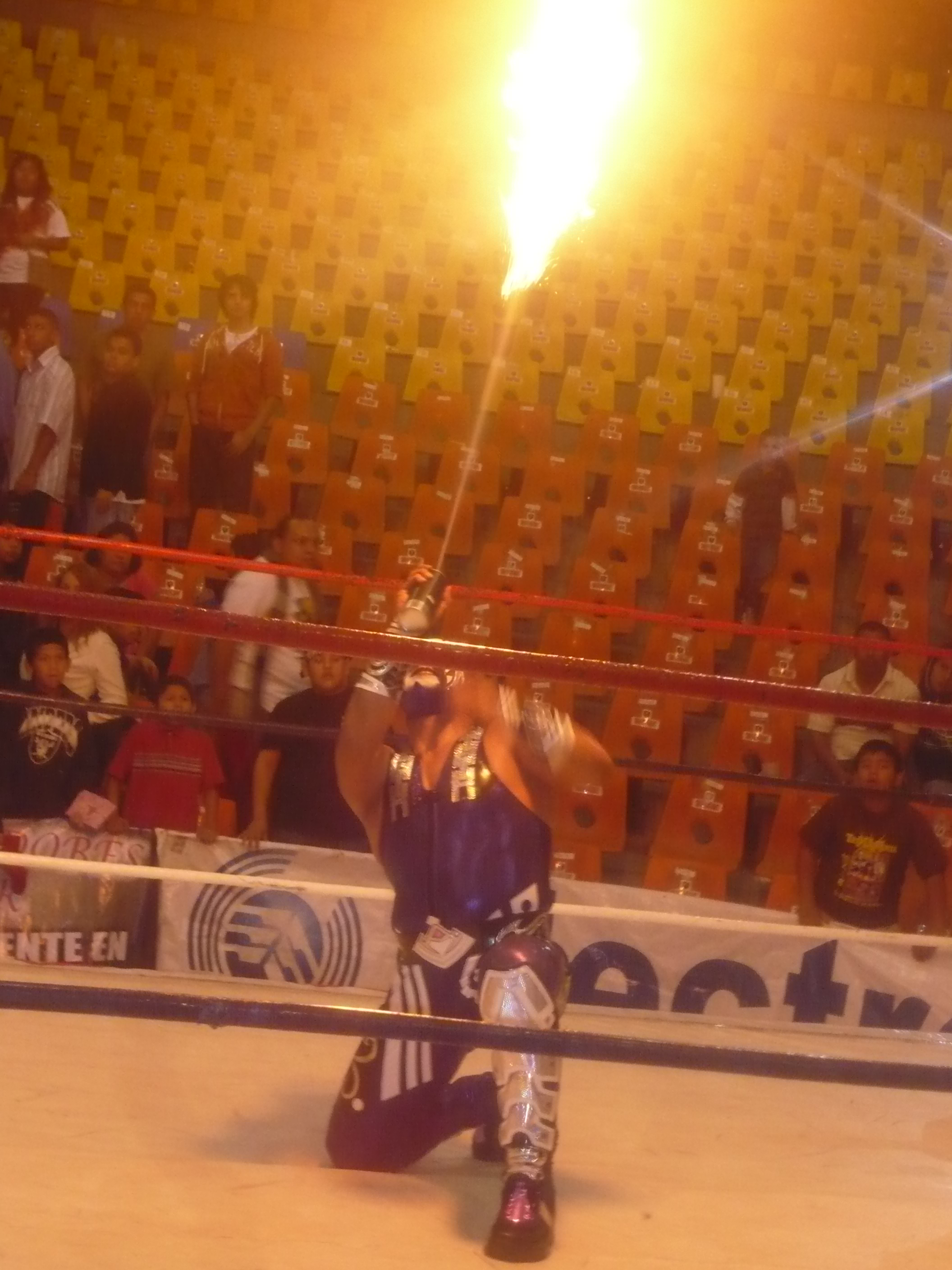
- Abismo Negro with his signature flamethrower display

Personal information
- Born: Andrés Alejandro Palomeque González; July 1, 1971 Villahermosa, Tabasco, Mexico
- Died: March 22, 2009 (aged 37) El Rosario, Sinaloa, Mexico
- Spouse: Martha Gonzalez (m. 1994)
- Children: 4

Professional wrestling career
- Ring name(s): Alex Dinamo; Pequeño Samurai; Furor; The Winner/Winners; Abismo Negro
- Billed height: 1.80 m (5 ft 11 in)
- Billed weight: 96 kg (212 lb)
- Billed from: Villahermosa, Tabasco, Mexico
- Trained by: El Noruego (Don Nerio Soto); Delio Soto; Diablo Velasco; Ray Mendoza
- Debut: 1987

Andrés Alejandro Palomeque González (July 1, 1971 – March 22, 2009) was a Mexican professional wrestler. He is best known for appearing under the stage name Abismo Negro, which is Spanish for "Black Abyss", in the Asistencia Asesoría y Administración (AAA) promotion. Before appearing under the ring name Abismo Negro, Palomeque worked for five years under the alias "[the] Winners", and before that, also wrestled as the characters "Alex Dinamo", "Pequeño Samurai", and "Furor" for short periods. Palomeque owned and operated the Gimnasio Abismo Negro, a wrestling school where individuals were trained to become professional wrestlers.

Throughout his career, Palomeque worked for the two most prominent professional wrestling promotions in Mexico: Consejo Mundial de Lucha Libre (CMLL) and AAA. He also worked for the World Wrestling Federation (WWF) and Total Nonstop Action Wrestling (TNA) in North America due to talent exchange programs between AAA and WWF in 1997 and TNA in 2004, as well as making appearances for Michinoku Pro and Pro Wrestling Noah in Japan.

On March 22, 2009, Palomeque was found dead in a river near El Rosario, Sinaloa; the official cause of death was listed as drowning. On the night before, a wrestler using the Abismo Negro outfit worked an AAA show pretending to be Palomeque; this incident caused the promoter to be barred from promoting shows for two years. Palomeque was inducted into the AAA Hall of Fame in June 2013.

== Early life ==
Andrés Alejandro Palomeque González was born on July 1, 1971, in Villahermosa, Tabasco, Mexico. Palomeque started to get interested in lucha libre at the age of nine when his father, Juan Francisco Palomeque Torres, took him to his first event. The family later moved to Poza Rica, where a young Palomeque took up pentathlon (long jump, high jump, 110 metres hurdles run, shot put, 1500 metres run) in school and trained in martial arts with his brother César Palomeque. Palomeque started working in a gymnasium where wrestlers were trained at the age of thirteen, initially cleaning after hours to pay for his gym access. He began training to become a professional wrestler under Don Nerio Soto, who worked under the ring name El Noruego ("The Norwegian"), and his brother Delio Soto after the family moved back to the Tabasco region. Don later recollected how he and his family took the young man in and made him part of their family, practically adopting him while he was enrolled in Soto's wrestling school, and later as he worked on the local wrestling circuit.

== Professional wrestling career ==
=== Early career (1987–1992) ===
Palomeque made his professional wrestling debut in 1987, at the age of 16, under the ring name "Alex Dinamo". He received further training from famous Mexican wrestling coaches Diablo Velasco and Ray Mendoza before changing his character and ring name to "Pequeño Samurai"—a masked persona patterned after the Japanese samurai tradition. In 1991, Palomeque began working for Consejo Mundial de Lucha Libre (CMLL), the biggest wrestling promotion in Mexico at that time, as Furor, another masked ring persona. As Furor, Palomeque won his first Lucha de Apuestas ("bet match"), defeating his mentor, El Noruego, in a match where Noruego's hair and Palomeque's mask was at stake.

=== AAA (1992–2004) ===
==== Winners (1992–1997) ====
When CMLL head writer Antonio Peña left the company in 1992 to create his own wrestling promotion, Asistencia Asesoría y Administración (AAA), Palomeque followed suit and joined AAA. There, his ring persona was changed to "Winners" (sometimes written as Winner's), a fan favorite character (técnico) who wore a silver bodysuit and mask. He wrestled on the very first Triplemanía on April 30, 1993, teaming with Super Caló and El Salsero to defeat Baby Sharon, May Flowers and Rudy Reyna in a six-man tag team match. At Triplemanía II-A on April 26, 1994, he, Rey Misterio and Rey Misterio Jr. to defeat Los Destructores ("The Destroyers"; Rocco Valente, Tony Arce and Vulcano).

In early 1995, Winners participated in a Relevos Suicidas ("Suicide Relays") tag team match, in which the losing team members have a match of their own, with the loser being forced to unmask; Winners' team won the match. At Triplemanía III-B on June 18, he placed his mask on the line against Marabunta, defeating him to retain it. On June 30, at Triplemanía III-C, Winners lost his mask to Caló, thus never being able to wear it again. His mask loss only enhanced Winners' popularity, as the handsome Palomeque's appeal among female fans increased. He and Caló also continued to work together as a team. On June 15, 1996, Winners, Caló, Misterio Jr. and Oro Jr. defeated Kraken, Halloween, Mosco de la Merced and Perro Silva at Triplemanía IV-B. On July 15, Winners, Caló, El Mexicano and La Parka defeated Fishman, Flowers, Jerry Estrada and Villano IV in one of the featured matches of Triplemanía IV-C.

==== Abismo Negro (1997–2004) ====
On January 10, 1997, Palomeque made his debut under the new character "Abismo Negro" in an eight-man tag team match. The character was that of a cheating villain (rudo) with a flamethrower display routine, created by using a lighter and an Aerosol spray can, which he regularly used during his entrance and, on occasion, during a match. His signature move was a piledriver known as the Marinete, where he simulated driving the top of his opponents' head into the mat. The move was "banned" in Mexican wrestling and led to a disqualification if it was used during the match, giving Negro the nickname El Rey del Martinete ("The King of the Piledriver"). Negro and Cibernético formed Los Vipers ("The Vipers") along with Psicosis, Mosco, Maniaco and Histeria (who was soon replaced by Histeria II). In 1998, Negro acquired a "mascot", a midget wrestler called Mini Abismo Negro. Los Vipers engaged in several scripted rivalries with other AAA groups, including the group of masked wrestlers dressed as clowns, Los Payasos ("The Clowns"), and Los Vatos Locos ("The Crazy Guys")—consisting of Espiritu, Flowers, Nygma, Picudo and Silver Cat. Negro defeated Pentagón on May 19 to win the Mexican National Middleweight Championship, which he held until January 1999. On June 7, he, Mini Abismo and new Vipers member Electroshock lost to Octagón, his mascot Octagóncito, and Pentagón at Triplemanía VI.

In 1999, Los Vipers split into two factions, with Negro leading a splinter group called Los Vipers Extreme ("The Extreme Vipers"), consisting of Electroshock, Pentagón, Shiima, El Cuervo and Mini Abismo, while Cibernético created a group called Los Vipers Primera Clase ("First Class Vipers"). After less than two months, the angle was dropped and Los Vipers reunited. Not long after, Cibernético formed a group intent on taking over AAA called Lucha Libre Latina (LLL); it was inspired by World Championship Wrestling (WCW)'s New World Order (nWo). Negro assumed leadership of Los Vipers, which became a subgroup within LLL. On May 2, Negro and Electroshock defeated Perro Aguayo and Perro Aguayo Jr. to win the Mexican National Tag Team Championship, but lost it after four months to Haytor and the Panther. Negro became one of the driving forces in LLL's feud with AAA owner Antonio Peña and his AAA loyalists, feuding with the likes of La Parka Jr., Latin Lover and Octagón. Negro's position as one of AAA's top workers was cemented on March 5, 2000, when he competed in the Rey de Reyes ("King of Kings") tournament. In the opening round, he defeated Dos Caras, Killer and Psicosis II, and in the finals, he defeated El Alebrije, Charly Manson and Cibernético to win the tournament.

Negro's status as a main eventer caused storyline issues between him and Cibernético, leading to a series of matches to see who should lead Los Vipers. On September 29, at Verano de Escandalo ("Summer of Scandal"), Negro defeated Cibernético. A steel cage match between the two at Guerra de Titanes ("War of the Titans") on December 8 ended without a winner, after which the rivalry cooled off. In 2001, Negro lost to La Parka Jr. in the finals of that year's Rey de Reyes. At Triplemanía IX on May 26, Negro, Cibernético, Electroshock and Máscara Maligna lost to Máscara Sagrada, Alebrije, Octagón and La Parka Jr., when Negro was forced to submit. In December 2002, Negro and Mini Abismo lost to Sagrada and Máscarita Sagrada in the finals of a tournament to crown the inaugural AAA Mascot Tag Team Champions. On March 16, 2003, Negro again lost to La Parka Jr. in the Rey de Reyes finals. In 2004, LLL was phased out in favor of a new super group, La Legión Extranjera ("The Foreign Legion"), meaning that Los Vipers now regularly teamed with foreign wrestlers, including NWA-TNA performers like Abyss.

=== World Wrestling Federation (1997) ===
Shortly after his debut as Abismo Negro, he made his World Wrestling Federation (WWF) debut, as part of a working relationship between the WWF and AAA, on the January 19, 1997 episode of Free For All, held on the pre-show before the Royal Rumble pay-per-view. On the telecast, Negro teamed with Heavy Metal and Histeria in a loss to Blue Demon Jr., Octagón and Tinieblas Jr. Negro appeared in January against Perro Aguayo Jr. and made two additional appearances on Monday Night Raw in March 1997. During his appearances in March, Negro was announced as being part of Los Vipers, a recently created alliance of wrestlers.

=== Japan (2000–2006) ===
Abismo Negro wrestled his first match in Japan for Michinoku Pro on April 9, 2000, at their Sumo Hall card, defeating Oriental. During AAA's tour of Japan, Negro wrestled in the main event of Triplemanía VIII on July 5, where he, Cibernético, Electroshock and Shiima lost to Octagón, Jushin Thunder Liger, Latin Lover and Cuije. Amid rumors that he was jumping from CMLL to AAA, Negro remained in AAA and was sent on a tour with Pro Wrestling Noah in the spring of 2006.

=== Total Nonstop Action Wrestling (2004) ===
In 2004, TNA and AAA established a partnership where TNA wrestlers performed in Mexico and AAA wrestlers appeared on TNA's weekly pay-per-views. Managed by AAA owner Antonio Peña, Palomeque, as Abismo Negro, along with Héctor Garza, Juventud Guerrera, Mr. Águila and later Heavy Metal, worked for TNA as Team AAA in the TNA America's X Cup Tournament. The team made their debut on January 28, 2004, defeating Chad Collyer, Eric Young, Matt Stryker and Shark Boy. In the following weeks, Negro and Team AAA won against Elix Skipper, Jerry Lynn and Sonjay Dutt, and finally all of Team USA in a four-on-four match to claim the Americas X Cup. On March 10, Team AAA successfully defended the X Cup against Team Canada, as Negro and Guerrera defeated Jack Evans and Teddy Hart to tie the score between the two teams, allowing for a final four-on-four elimination match that Team AAA won. Negro and the rest of Team AAA were rebranded as "Team Mexico" for the 2004 World X Cup Tournament. He remained undefeated until April 7, when his team lost to James Mason and Jason Allgood in one of the first matches of the tournament. Later that night, Team Mexico defeated Team UK to even the score. The World Cup saw Team Mexico lose to Team USA, Team Canada (Young and Bobby Roode), and Team Japan (Mitsu Hirai Jr. and Ryuji Hijikata). Team Mexico tied in points with Team USA and Team Canada, meaning that a representative of each team met in an Ultimate X match to determine the winner of the tournament. Garza represented Mexico, but Team USA's Chris Sabin won the match and the tournament.

=== Return to AAA (2005–2009) ===
After the World X Cup tournament ended, Negro returned to AAA full-time, taking full charge of Los Vipers. In early 2005, he lost to La Parka Jr. for the third time in the finals of that year's Rey de Reyes. AAA hinted at a possible técnico turn when Negro, Psicosis and Mini Psicosis attacked Cibernético. The two fought in a cage match that Cibernético won, but they eventually reconciled their differences once more. Later in the year, he finally turned técnico and began a sustained storyline with Cibernético and his group, La Secta Cibernética ("The Sect of Cibernético"). The on again, off again storyline with Cibernético was put on hold when Cibernético suffered a severe knee injury in late 2006. At some point during 2006, Los Vipers left La Legión due to their "Anti-Mexican" philosophy, thus feuding with the group and their imported wrestlers. At Verano de Escándalo on September 17, Negro, Electroshock, Histeria and Manson lost to Team TNA (A.J. Styles, Homicide, Low Ki and Samoa Joe).

In late 2007, AAA created a ring persona for a new wrestler called Black Abyss, who donned a mask, attire and wrestling style reminiscent of Negro. In 2008, Negro's "almost winning" streak at Rey de Reyes continued, as he lost to El Zorro in the finals after interference from Black Abyss. During the fall of 2008, AAA pushed their storyline further by having Black Abyss "injure" Negro with his own move, the Marinete. Negro was scheduled to take part in Triplemanía XVI on June 13, where he would face Los Vipers (Black Abyss, Histeria, Mr. Niebla and Psicosis) in a cage match. However, in the weeks before the show, Negro sustained an injury and the match was cancelled, with AAA citing the attack at Rey de Reyes as the storyline rationale for this development. Negro returned on December 6 at Guerra de Titanes, specifically challenging Black Abyss, teasing a Lucha de Apuestas with their masks on the line. Both Negro and Black Abyss were booked in the same four-way elimination match qualifier at Rey de Reyes on March 15, which turned out to be Negro's final televised appearance. Negro eliminated Black Abyss, but was in turn eliminated by Latin Lover. Black Abyss expressed his desire to honor Negro by maintaining the character following his death, although AAA showed little interest in featuring it prominently on television; he left AAA in October 2010.

== Personal life ==
Palomeque was married to a woman named Martha for 15 years, and the couple had four children, two girls and two boys. Palomeque's wife has been suffering from breast cancer for a number of years. One of his sons wrestles under the ring name "El Fiscal".

He often appeared on the morning television program Vida TV in full wrestling gear and persona, being billed as Abismo Negro. He usually appeared as a kind of judge for talent contests on the show, earning him the nickname Fiscal De Hierro de la Televisión ("The Iron Judge of Television"). Palomeque owned and operated "Gimnasio Abismo Negro", where he taught both professional wrestling and physical fitness. Graduates of Abismo Negro's wrestling school include independent wrestling workers El Intocable, Extassis and Mini Cibernético, as well as AAA workers Sexy Star and Aero Star. Abismo Negro is a playable character in AAA's first ever video game, AAA El Videojuego. The Abismo Negro character was one of the first characters used to promote the game and show the quality of the graphic rendering.

== Death and legacy ==
Palomeque was found dead on March 22, 2009; his body was found in a river near the town of El Rosario, Sinaloa. According to a bus driver who was transporting Palomeque and other passengers to Mexico City two nights earlier, Palomeque became agitated, panicked and demanded to be let off the bus despite it being 1:30 in the morning. A text message he sent to his wife after leaving the bus confirmed that Palomeque found himself lost on the dark hillside. After receiving the text message, his wife contacted local wrestling promoter Vicente Martinez, who organized a search party. On the morning of March 22, Palomeque was found floating face down in the river. Afterwards, medical expert Jesús Enrique Castro López stated that such an anxiety attack could be steroid related, but Palomeque's alleged steroid abuse has not been confirmed. An autopsy was carried out on March 23, which determined that the cause of death was drowning, and no further investigation into the death was planned. A memorial was held in Mexico City on March 24 for friends and family of Palomeque, many of whom showed up without their masks on, to keep the focus of the event on Palomeque. His body was subsequently cremated, with the ashes taken to Villahermosa to be buried.

On March 21, while Palomeque was either lost in the hills or already dead, someone worked as Abismo Negro at an AAA show in Cancún. In the past, the wrestler known as Black Abyss had worked as Abismo Negro when Palomeque failed to show, but this time, Black Abyss was not the man behind the mask, as he was on the opposing team that night. Following the discovery of Palomeque's body, the deception in Cancun received national coverage in Mexico, and the local promoter responsible for the show, Renán Martínez, was suspended for two years by the Benito Júarez Boxing and Wrestling commission. On November 25, 2024, during an appearance on Latin Lover's podcast, fellow Mexican wrestler Laredo Kid admitted to have been the one who replaced Abismo Negro during that match with authorization from AAA. According to Laredo, he only made a brief appearance as Abismo Negro to be beaten and sent on a stretcher to the back.

During Triplemanía XVII on June 13, 2009, there was a moment of silence in memory of Abismo Negro, Antonio Peña and Mitsuharu Misawa (who died in the ring the night before). On October 26, AAA held the Torneo Abismo Negro in honor of Palomeque; the tournament was a seven-man gauntlet-style match and included a mix of five AAA veterans and two Abismo Negro students. The participants were Cuervo, Black Abyss, Gato Eveready, Kempo Dragon, Joe Líder, Extreme Tiger and Relámpago. Relámpago, Abismo Negro's last student to turn professional, won the match after 48 minutes. The event was not televised and did not become an annual event. On September 27, 2011, AAA announced the start of a competition to find a new Abismo Negro, although it ended without anyone taking over the character.

== Championships and accomplishments ==
- Asistencia Asesoría y Administración
  - AAA Mascot Tag Team Championship (1 time) – with Mini Abismo Negro
  - Mexican National Middleweight Championship (1 time)
  - Mexican National Tag Team Championship (2 time) – with Electroshock (2)
  - AAA Rey de Reyes (2000)
  - AAA Hall of Fame (Class of 2013)
- Pro Wrestling Illustrated
  - PWI ranked him #91 of the 500 best singles wrestlers of the PWI 500 in 2004
- Total Nonstop Action Wrestling
  - America's X Cup (2004) – with Mr. Águila, Juventud Guerrera, Héctor Garza and Heavy Metal

== Luchas de Apuestas record ==
Winner (wager)	Loser (wager)	Location	Event	Date	Notes
Furor (mask)	El Noruego (hair)	Comalcalco, Tabasco, Mexico	Live event	N/A	
Winners (mask)	Marabunta (mask)	Tonalá, Jalisco, Mexico	Triplemanía III-B	June 18, 1995	
Super Caló (mask)	Winners (mask)	Madero, Tamaulipas, Mexico	Triplemanía III-C	June 30, 1995	
Abismo Negro (hair)	Stuka Jr. (hair)	N/A	Live event	N/A	(Note: This was a Lucha del reves match, a hair vs. hair between two masked wrestlers.)
Abismo Negro (hair)	The Panther (hair)	Monterrey, Nuevo León, Mexico	Live event	January 30, 2000	
Abismo Negro (hair)	El Alebrije (hair)	Tijuana, Baja California, Mexico	Live event	September 7, 2001	

== See also ==
- List of premature professional wrestling deaths
