= Triplemanía XVII =

2009 Lucha Libre AAA World Wide event

- Promotion: AAA
- Date: June 13, 2009
- City: Mexico City, Mexico
- Venue: Palacio de los Deportes
- Tagline(s): Aquí se escribe la historia ("History is written here")

Pay-per-view chronology
← Previous; Rey de Reyes	Next → Verano de Escándalo

Triplemanía chronology
← Previous; XVI	Next → XVIII

Triplemanía XVII was a professional wrestling pay-per-view (PPV) event produced by the AAA promotion, which took place on June 13, 2009 at the Palacio de los Deportes in Mexico City, Mexico. It was the year an event was held under the Triplemanía chronology. Triplemanía XVII was the third Triplemanía event to take place in Mexico City, and the second to take place in Palacio de los Deportes, site of the previous Triplemanía XVI as well. The show drew close to 16.000 spectators, down from the previous years 19.000 spectators in the same venue. The Triplemanía set reduced the capacity of the arena compared to the previous year but it was not a complete sell out.

The show featured two main events, four undercard matches and one untelevised "dark match". The first of two main event matches was a singles match for the AAA Mega Championship, a match that saw challenger Dr. Wagner Jr. defeat the champion El Mesías to win the championship. The other main event was a special five on five Steel cage match where the storyline was the fight over control of AAA between Dorian Roldan and Konnan. Each side chose a team of five to represent them, with the winning team earning control of the company. On the night the team representing Roldan and AAA, El Hijo del Santo, La Parka, Vampiro, Octagón, and Jack Evans, defeated Konnan's team of Silver King, Chessman, Kenzo Suzuki, Electroshock, and Teddy Hart to return control of the promotion to Joaquin Roldan. Featured matches on the undercard included Alex Koslov defending the AAA Cruiserweight Championship against Extreme Tiger, Crazy Boy, and Alan Stone in a hardcore match, La Hermandad Extrema (Nicho El Millonario and Joe Líder) defending the AAA World Tag Team Championship against Latin Lover and Marco Corleone. Finally the show featured an eight-man and a six-man tag team match.

== Production ==
=== Background ===
In early 1992 Antonio Peña was working as a booker and storyline writer for Consejo Mundial de Lucha Libre (CMLL), Mexico's largest and the world's oldest wrestling promotion, and was frustrated by CMLL's very conservative approach to professional wrestling, specifically the style of wrestling known as Lucha Libre (Spanish for "freestyle wrestling"). He joined forced with a number of younger, very talented wrestlers who felt like CMLL was not giving them the recognition they deserved and decided to split from CMLL to create Asistencia Asesoría y Administración, later simply known as "AAA" or Triple A. After making a deal with the Televisa television network AAA held their first show in April 1992. The following year Peña and AAA held their first Triplemanía event, building it into an annual event that would become AAA's Super Bowl event, similar to the WWE's WrestleMania being the biggest show of the year. The 2009 Triplemanía was the 17th year in a row AAA held a Triplemanía show and the 22nd overall show under the Triplemanía banner.

=== Storylines ===
The Triplemanía XVII show featured seventy professional wrestling matches with different wrestlers involved in pre-existing scripted feuds, plots and storylines. Wrestlers were portrayed as either heels (referred to as rudos in Mexico, those that portray the "bad guys") or faces (técnicos in Mexico, the "good guy" characters) as they followed a series of tension-building events, which culminated in a wrestling match or series of matches.

The most dominating storyline in AAA over the last number of years was the feud between the AAA loyalistst and Konnan's La Legión Extranjera ("The Foreign Legion"). The "war" between the two factions had been going on for several years with La Legión winning control of AAA at the 2008 Antonio Peña Memorial Show in a multi-man Steel cage elimination match victory over a team representing AAA. Since then the storyline developed as La Legión took control of the federation while Joaquin Roldan and Marisela Peña tried to regain control of it. In the spring of 2009 it was announced that the main event of Triplemanía XVII would be another steel cage elimination match between AAA and La Legión, with teams of five facing off. Over the following weeks AAA announced the match participants with Konnan's side being represented by Silver King, Electroshock, Chessman, Teddy Hart and Kenzo Suzuki. Team AAA would be represented by La Parka and Octagón, both of whom have represented AAA throughout the feud. They would be joined by Vampiro, former AAA Commissioner who resigned his position in order to wrestle against La Legión and by Jack Evans who had turned on La Legión in the months before Triplemanía XVII. AAA held off on announcing the last AAA representative for a while until they revealed that they had brought in El Hijo del Santo to be the team captain. Hijo del Santo had not worked for AAA in 14 years before the show, but was one of the key players in the early days of AAA and a legend in Mexico. Joaquin Roldan later announced that he had hired a special guest referee for the match, Cien Caras who had been feuding with Konnan when AAA was founded.

Dr. Wagner Jr. had made a surprise appearance at the 2009 Rey de Reyes show, making his debut after the main event where he challenged El Mesías for a shot at the AAA Mega Championship. Konnan tried to convince Dr. Wagner Jr. to join La Legión, even suspending him for two weeks so he could "make up his mind". In actuality this was done to cover up the fact that Dr. Wagner Jr. still had booking responsibilities to take care off before he could work for AAA full-time. In the lead up to Triplemanía XVII Dr. Wagner Jr. and El Mesías teamed up to wrestle against La Legión, showing unity and respect for each other. The Triplemanía XVII match would be their first match against each other.

Dr. Wagner Jr. was not the only wrestler to make a surprise debut at the 2009 Rey de Reyes. Marco Corleone had left Consejo Mundial de Lucha Libre (CMLL), AAA's biggest rival, and made his surprising jump during the Rey de Reyes show. In the months after Rey de Reyes it was announced that Marco Corleone would team up with Latin Lover to challenge La Hermandad 187 (Nicho and Joe Líder) for the AAA World Tag Team Championship at Triplemanía XVII. While the two had never teamed up before they were paired up since they had similar ring characters as they were hansome, metro sexual men with a male-dancer character that appealed to the women in the audience.

In the spring of 2009 AAA decided to create the AAA Cruiserweight Championship and held a tournament to crown the first champion. The tournament final saw Alex Koslov defeat Extreme Tiger and Alan Stone to become the first ever champion. AAA announced that Koslov would defend the title in a four-way elimination hardcore match against Tiger, Alan Stone and Crazy Boy.

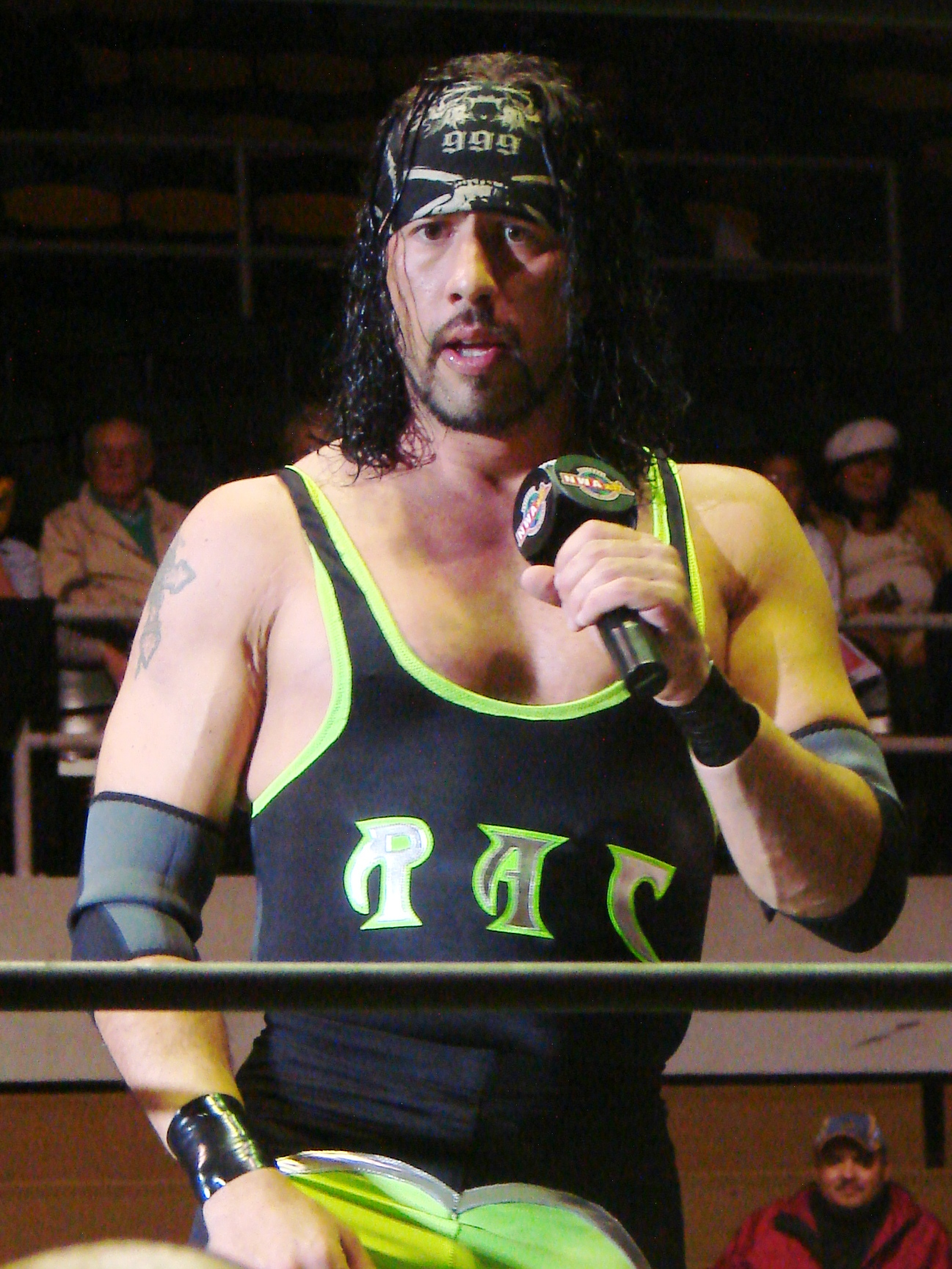
X-Pac originally scheduled to face El Zorro in a singles match.

AAA originally announced that they had booked X-Pac against El Zorro for Triplemanía XVIII. Later on the match was changed to play off feud between El Zorro and Charly Manson that started when Manson returned from a serious injury and included a match at the 2009 Rey de Reyes. Manson would team up with X-Pac and Rocky Romero to take on El Zorro, Dark Ozz and Dark Escoria in a match where the captain of the losing team (Manson or Zorro) would receive ten lashes with a Kendo Stick from the winning team.

Triplemanía XVII was also scheduled to feature a Relevos Atómicos de locura match (Eight man madness" match), a match created by AAA founder Antonio Peña. The match features teams of aman, a woman, a Mini-Estrella and an Exotico and was centered around the long running storyline between real life husband and wife Billy Boy and Faby Apache. The storyline between the two reached back as far as 2005 where the two were paired up on screen. The storyline saw many twists and turns over the years and included Faby's father Gran Apache, sister Mari Apache as well as the couple's child Marvin. In the spring of 2010 Aero Star was written into the storyline as a new love interest for Faby Apache, Initially Billy Boy acted like he did not care as he himself had found a new love in Sexy Star. The Relevos de locura match was scheduled to have Billy Boy and Sexy Star team up with Mini-Estrella Mini Abismo Negro and Exotico Polvo de Estrellas while Faby Apache teamed up with El Elegido, Octagoncito and Pimpinela Escarlata.

== Controversies ==
Several events leading up to TripeManía XVII put the participation of Jack Evans, Konnan and Silver King in question. The Mexico City Boxing and Wrestling Commission had suspended both Evans and Konnan as a result of a backstage fight between the two and Juventud Guerrera and it looked like neither would be allowed to appear at the show. While AAA kept promoting Evans as a participant the plans to have Konnan wrestle in the main event were changed early on, giving him a less active role on the show in case the Commission suspended him. The suspension was lifted on both wrestlers in the weeks leading up to Triplemanía XVII.

Silver King had originally lost his mask in a Lucha de Apuestas match against El Hijo del Santo in 1987 and according to Mexican wrestling regulations was not allowed to wear a mask as long as he wrestled as Silver King. In 2006 Silver King had remasked while working in Japan, which is not subject to Lucha rules, but continued to wear the mask when he returned to AAA in 2008. The Mexico City Boxing and Wrestling Commission barred Silver King from wearing a mask when wrestling in Mexico City. Silver King continued to wear the mask when wrestling outside Mexico City, but would face a hefty fine and suspension if he wore his mask at Triplemanía XVII.

== Production ==
AAA invested 4,000,000 Pesos in the production of Triplemanía XVII including a more elaborate set that the previous year's Triplemanía event. They used the equivalent of twelve trailers of production space to handle the taping of the event, the show was not broadcast on regular television but as a pay-per-view through Sky with a later special edition DVD release.

== Event ==
The show began at 8:40 local time, starting with a Dark match that was only seen by the fans in attendance and not shown on the Pay-Per-View broadcast. The undefeated Los Psycho Circus (Psycho Clown, Killer Clown and Zombie Clown) faced off against Real Fuerza Aérea represented by Aero Star, Laredo Kid and Super Fly. Super Fly wore a mask that was a combination of his own mask and the mask his father wore when he wrestled as "El Seminarista" while Aero Star wore a mask that was a combination of his own and the mask of his mentor who had recently died, Abismo Negro. During the match Super Fly was thrown out of the ring with such force that he was removed from the ring on a stretcher, leaving Aero Star and Laredo Kid a man down. Los Psycho Circus size advantage proved too much for Aero Star and Laredo Kid as Killer Clown pinned Aero Star after just 2 minutes and 24 seconds of wrestling.

=== Preliminary matches ===
The pay-per-view opened up with a match type created by AAA, a Relevos Atómicos de locura match (Spanish for "Eight-man madness match"). Relevos Atómicos de locura matches always feature teams composed of a male wrestler, a female wrestler, an Exotico wrestler and a Mini-Estrella facing off against each other. During the introductions the Exotico Polvo de Estrellas wore a robe and wig inspired by the Poison Ivy character from the Batman & Robin movie that featured a headdress that shot fireworks. The main story of the match focused on Billy Boy and Sexy Star's ongoing feud with Faby Apache. The match was not isolated to males wrestling against males or Mini-Estrellas wrestling against Mini-Estrellas as all eight combatants mixed it up during the match. Octagoncito almost pinned his rival Mini Abismo Negro on one occasion, narrowly avoiding defeat. Sexy Star tried to seduce El Elegido, hoping to keep him from hitting her. When Billy Boy entered the ring Sexy Star quickly pulled El Elegido's mask off and left the ring with it, this left him vulnerable for Billy Boy to pin him while he was trying to cover up his face. Following their victory Sexy Star and Billy Boy attacked Faby Apache, but were stopped by the return of Faby's sister Mari Apache who ran to the ring and saved her sister from a beating.

After the first match, AAA held a brief tribute to honor AAA founder Antonio Peña, who had died in 2007; longtime AAA wrestler Abismo Negro, who died in March 2009; and Japanese wrestler Mitsuharu Misawa, who died shortly before Triplemanía XVIII.

The second PPV match of the night carried the stipulation that the captain of the losing team (El Zorro or Charly Manson) would receive 10 lashes with a Singapore cane. The real development came after the match as the storyline of the 10 lashes received more attention than the preceding match. After nearly 20 minutes of wrestling X-Pac executed his X-Factor finishing move on El Zorro twice and then pinned him. Following the loss Zorro calmly removed his shirt and then knelt down to take his punishment. X-Pac and Rocky Romero delivered the first three strikes to the back of El Zorro who took the punishment without complaining. When Charly Manson returned to the ring wearing a Zorro style mask and mockingly offering El Zorro a paper rose El Zorro became enraged and started to fight back. He took the Singapore cane from Romero and began hitting his opponents, moments later Dark Ozz and Dark Escoria's team mates Dark Espiritu and Dark Cuervo ran to the ring, giving the rudo side a five on three advantage. El Zorro and the Black Family beat up all three members and successfully fought off Real Fuerza Aérea who came to the ring to make the save. In the closing minutes of the segment El Zorro confronted Marisel Peña who sat at ringside, Peña slapped El Zorro, a move that seemingly shocked El Zorro.

=== Semi-main event matches ===
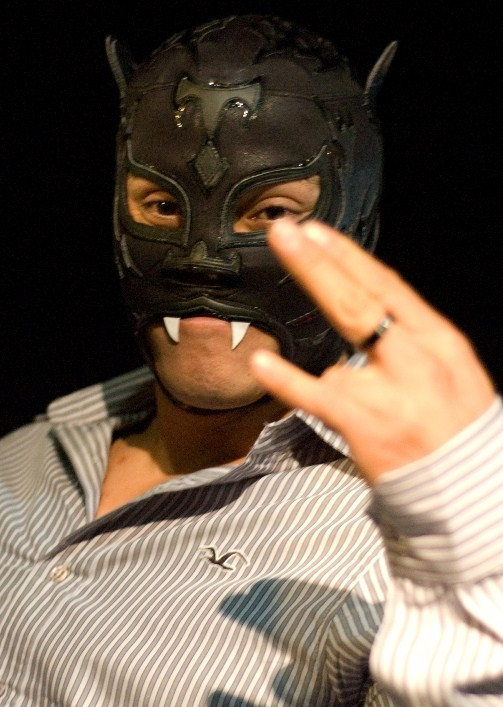
Extreme Tiger won the AAA Cruiserweight Championship.

Alex Koslov put his recently won AAA Cruiserweight Championship on the line in the third PPV match of the night as he wrestled against Extreme Tiger, Crazy Boy and Alan Stone in an Elimination hardcore match. The match saw the frequent use of both tables and ladders throughout the match, mixed in with steel chairs for good measure. Koslov's reign as the first AAA Cruiserweight champion ended after just over two weeks as he was the first man eliminated from the match, pinned by Alan Stone. With Koslov eliminated it was a guarantee that there would be a new champion by the end of the match. Alan Stone's inexperience in Hardcore matches caused him to be eliminated secondly, leaving Crazy Boy and Extreme Tiger, both of whom had a great deal of experience with hardcore matches. The final section of the match had several slow sections where one wrestler set up a table, a ladder or an elaborate chair set up while the other wrestler had to lay on the mat and pretend to be knocked down. At one point Crazy Boy very obviously pushed himself into position so that Extreme Tiger could execute a leap off the top rope onto him. In the final moments of the match saw Extreme Tiger leap out of the ring and splash Crazy Boy through a table. After taking a moment to recover Extreme Tiger was able to get back in the ring, only seconds before the referee counted Crazy Boy out. With the count out victory Extreme Tiger was declared the new AAA Cruiserweight champion.

The second title match of the night saw long time AAA World Tag Team Champions La Hermandad 187 (Nicho and Joe Líder) defend against Latin Lover and Marco Corleone, who were teaming together for the first time that night. La Hermandad expertly cut the ring in half, keeping Marco Corleone from tagging out so that they could wear him down. Corleone either came into the match with an existing injury or he bruised his thigh early in the match as he favored his right leg throughout most of the match. The crowd booed the supposed fan favorite Latin Lover every time he entered the ring to help out Corleone, which seemed to irritate him. The end came when rudo referee el Hijo del Tirantes tripped Marco Corleone as he was about to take his trademark leap out of the ring, allowing La Hermandad to pin Corleone, making their eight successful title defense in a row. Following the match Corleone and Latin Lover argued and left the ring separately.

=== Main events ===
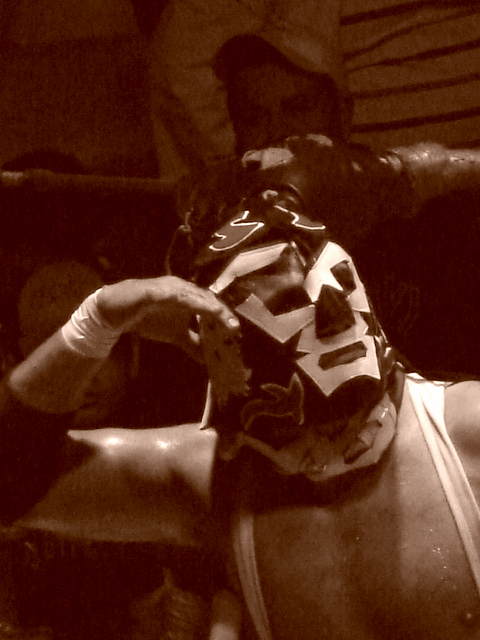
Dr. Wagner Jr., the challenger.

The first of the double-main event of Triplemanía XVII was the AAA Mega Championship "dream match" as El Mesías defended the championship against Dr. Wagner Jr. While the crowd responded largely positively to El Mesías as he came to the ring the response to Dr. Wagner Jr. was overwhelmingly supportive, especially as Dr. Wagner Jr.'s ring gear and mask was patterned on the Mexican flag, invoking a feeling of national pride in the fans. The match started out cleanly with the two wrestlers exchanging moves and holds. The initial part of the match was centered around the respect each wrestler clearly had for the other. After a while El Mesías began wrestling a more rudo style, a bit rougher in the ring with more brawling than wrestling as a response to the crowd being mainly behind Dr. Wagner Jr. Once El Mesías began working as a rudo he took more control of the match, tearing Dr. Wagner Jr.'s mask open and later on drawing blood from the Doctor. Wagner responded in kind and before the match was over both wrestlers bled profusely from their foreheads. The match went almost 40 minutes in total and saw both competitors fight inside and outside of the ring in a very competitive, energetic match. El Mesías almost won the match when he slammed Dr. Wagner Jr. through a table on the outside of the ring, but the Doctor made a last second recovery and entered the ring before the count of 20. Dr. Wagner Jr. was finally able to capitalize on a mistake by El Mesías and executed not one, but two Wagner Drivers on El Mesías and pinned him. The crowd roared in approval as Dr. Wagner Jr. was announced as the new Mega Champion, especially when he struck his trademark kneeling pose in the middle of the ring.

The cage was quickly erected for the second main event and soon after Konnan's La Legión Extranjera came to the ring. Silver King wore his mask as he marched to the ring, apparently defying a ruling by the Mexican' boxing and wrestling commission. When he reached the cage he took his mask off to reveal that he had his entire head painted to look like his mask, thus avoiding any further legal trouble. El Hijo del Santo was the last wrestler to come out for the match, representing AAA for the first time in 14 years. La Legión gained the early advantage with their cheating tactics, which included handcuffing La Parka to the cage, both to immobilize him and to ensure that he would not be able to climb out of the cage. After more action Konnan appeared on the Jumbotron, Konnan revealed that he had the key to the handcuffs and that he was not coming near the ring, just to ensure that his team would win. After hearing Konnan's comments special referee Cien Caras went backstage to retrieve the key. Back in the ring Vampiro and Kenzo Suzuki were the first two wrestlers to climb out of the cage, leaving it a four on four match. Moments later Octágon left the cage as well giving Team AAA the advantage. During this time La Hermandad 187 came to ringside to stop anyone from the backstage area from coming to the ring, hired by La Legión to keep the numbers advantage throughout the match. Teddy Hart was the next wrestler to escape, leaving the cage only moments after Cien Caras returned to ringside with the key. La Hermandad tried to stop Caras, but he was able to hand the key to Joaquin Roldan who then freed La Parka. Chessman was the next wrestler to escape, which combined with Konnan coming to ringside meant that La Legión was able to outnumber the wrestlers outside the cage. As La Hermandad and Chessman fought with Octagón and Vampiro Jack Evans climbed up the cage and then leapt off the top with a spectacular somersault splash that knocked everyone down. Inside the ring El Hijo del Santo applied the Camel Clutch on Electroshock, but while Hijo del Santo had the hold locked in Konnan pulled out a fire extinguisher and sprayed white foam in Hijo del Santo's face. Electroshock quickly left the cage, taking advantage of Hijo del Santo being temporarily blinded. La Parka and Silver King fights each other while both try to escape the ring. At one point Konnan tries to climb up and help Silver King escape so his team can win the match but out comes El Zorro, wearing a black mask. Instead of helping out La Legión, Zorro turns on them, handing his kendo stick to Joaquin Roldan, who proceeds to hit Konnan with it. Meanwhile, inside the cage, La Parka takes care of Silver King, helps El Hijo del Santo up and climbs out of the cage. Silver King stops El Hijo del Santo from escaping the cage and the two start to trade punches at the top of the cage wall, ending with Silver King falling down to the mat and Santo climbing up and over the top to win the match for AAA. Following the match El Hijo del Santo hands the urn of Antonio Peña over to Joaquin Roldan and Marisela Peña as the representation of them regaining control of AAA.

== Aftermath ==
Following the loss in the main event Konnan was fired (in storyline terms) by Joaquin Roldan, disbanding La Legión Extranjera as a result. Konnan swore he would get revenge on AAA and that he would return with a "surprise". Konnan would eventually return, backed up by the reborn La Legión to fight against AAA. Triplemanía XVII turned out to be El Hijo del Santo's only match for AAA as the two sides could not come to terms over a long term agreement. Over the summer of 2009 Dr. Wagner Jr. had to contend with both the challenges of former champion El Mesías as well as new challenges from Cibernético. Cibernético had left AAA when Konnan took control of the promotion, vacating the Mega Championship in the process and only returned once Konnan was no longer in charge. Since he had not lost the title, but vacated it both he and El Mesías were given a chance to wrestle against Dr. Wagner Jr. at the 2009 Verano de Escandalo which Dr. Wagner Jr. won. The feud between Extreme Tiger and Alex Koslov continued beyond Triplemanía XVII and saw Koslov turn rudo as part of the storyline. Koslov became a two time Cruiserweight champion at Verano de Escandalo 2009.

== Reception ==
Grita Radio reports stated that "In keeping with the general expectation, Triplemanía XVII was a great event, especially the production, some of the wrestling left a divided opinion". They also stated that the fans they polled while leaving the event gave the production a "10" out of 10 while the wrestling was rated a "7.5" out of 10. The match between Dr. Wagner Jr. and El Mesías was voted the Súper Luchas Magazine "Match of the year" for 2009.

== Results ==
No.	Results	Stipulations	Times
1^{D}	Los Psycho Circus (Psycho Clown, Killer Clown, and Zombie Clown) defeated Real Fuerza Aérea (Laredo Kid, Superfly, and Aero Star)	Six Man "Lucha Libre rules" Tag Team match	02:24
2	Billy Boy, Sexy Star, Polvo de Estrellas and Mini Abismo Negro defeated El Elegido, Faby Apache, Pimpinela Escarlata, and Octagoncito	Relevos Atómicos de Locura match	24:10
3	X-Pac (Captain), Charly Manson, and Rocky Romero defeated El Zorro (Captain), Dark Ozz, and Dark Scoria	Six Man "Lucha Libre rules" Tag Team match; Captain of the losing team gets 10 strikes with a Singapore cane	18:51
4	Extreme Tiger defeated Alex Koslov (c), Crazy Boy, and Alan Stone	Four Way Elimination hardcore match for the AAA Cruiserweight Championship	24:58
5	La Hermandad 187 (Nicho El Millonario and Joe Líder) (C) defeated Latin Lover and Marco Corleone	Tag Team match for the AAA World Tag Team Championship	10:55
6	Dr. Wagner Jr. defeated El Mesías (c)	Singles match for the AAA Mega Championship	39:11
7	Team AAA (El Hijo del Santo, La Parka, Vampiro, Octagón, and Jack Evans) defeated La Legion Extranjera (Silver King, Chessman, Kenzo Suzuki, Electroshock, and Teddy Hart)	Six Sides of Steel cage match for control of AAA.	24:20
(c) / – the champion(s) heading into the match; D / – this was a dark match

Four Way Elimination Hardcore match eliminations

1.

#	Eliminated	Eliminated by
1	Alex Koslov	Alan Stone
2	Alan Stone	Extreme Tiger
3	Crazy Boy	Extreme Tiger
