= Alas de Oro =

Lucha Libre AAA World Wide tournament

The Alas de Oros (Spanish for "Wings of Gold") is an annual professional wrestling tournament held by the Mexican professional wrestling promotion Lucha Libre AAA World Wide (AAA). The tournament features young high-fliers, hence the "Wings of Gold" moniker, who are either low-card or mid-card workers at the time of the tournament. The "Alas de Oro" title is not defended outside the tournament like AAA's Reina de Reinas title is. The tournament was created in 2007 and saw Extreme Tiger win the first Alas de Oro, in 2008 Aero Star won the tournament.

== Alas de Oro 2007 ==
The first Alas de Oro tournament featured an eight-man elimination match where two wrestlers were in the ring at the same time while the remaining competitors stayed on the floor. If a wrestler was eliminated or left the ring a wrestler from the outside could enter the ring to continue the match. The tournament took place on July 27, 2007, and included Real Fuerza Aérea (Laredo Kid, Pegasso, Rey Cometa, Aero Star and Super Fly), Hombre sin Miedo, Extreme Tiger and Escoria. Escoria was the sole Rudo (Heel or bad guy) in the match. Extreme Tiger won the match eliminating Super Fly as the last competitor. Extreme Tiger was the competitor with the most eliminations, three (Super Fly, Hombre Sin Miedo and Laredo Kid).

#	Eliminated	Eliminator	Time
1	Escoria	Aero Star	03:15
2	Hombre Sin Miedo	Extreme Tiger	04:01
3	Laredo Kid	Extreme Tiger	07:49
4	Pegasso	Super Fly	09:44
5	Rey Cometa	Aero Star	11:48
6	Aero Star	Super Fly	13:48
7	Super Fly	Extreme Tiger	14:29
8	Winner	Extreme Tiger	14:29

== Alas de Oro 2008 ==
The 2008 version of Alas de Oro was held on August 8, 2008, and this year included nine wrestlers in the same elimination match format that was used for the 2007 event. There were four wrestlers from the 2007 match that also participated in the 2008 version, including the previous winner Extreme Tiger as well as Aero Star, Escoria and Super Fly. In the 2008 event there was a more balanced Tecnico/Rudo mix than in 2007 as Rudos Jack Evans and Teddy Hart competed alongside Último Gladiador, El Ángel and Gato Eveready. Extreme Tigre was eliminated second to last, just before Aero Star pinned Jack Evans to win the match. During the pinfall Jack Evans kicked out for a controversial finish. A rematch a few weeks later saw Aero Star get a clean, decisive victory over Evans to eliminate any doubt about who won the Alas de Oro.

#	Eliminated	Eliminator	Time
1	Gato Eveready	Teddy Hart	
2	El Ángel	Extreme Tiger	
3	Teddy Hart	Último Gladiador	
4	Último Gladiador	Extreme Tiger	
5	Escoria	Super Fly	
6	Super Fly	Jack Evans	
7	Joe Líder	Extreme Tiger	
8	Extreme Tiger	Jack Evans	10:09
9	Jack Evans	Aero Star	10:09
