= TripleSEM =

Professional wrestling event

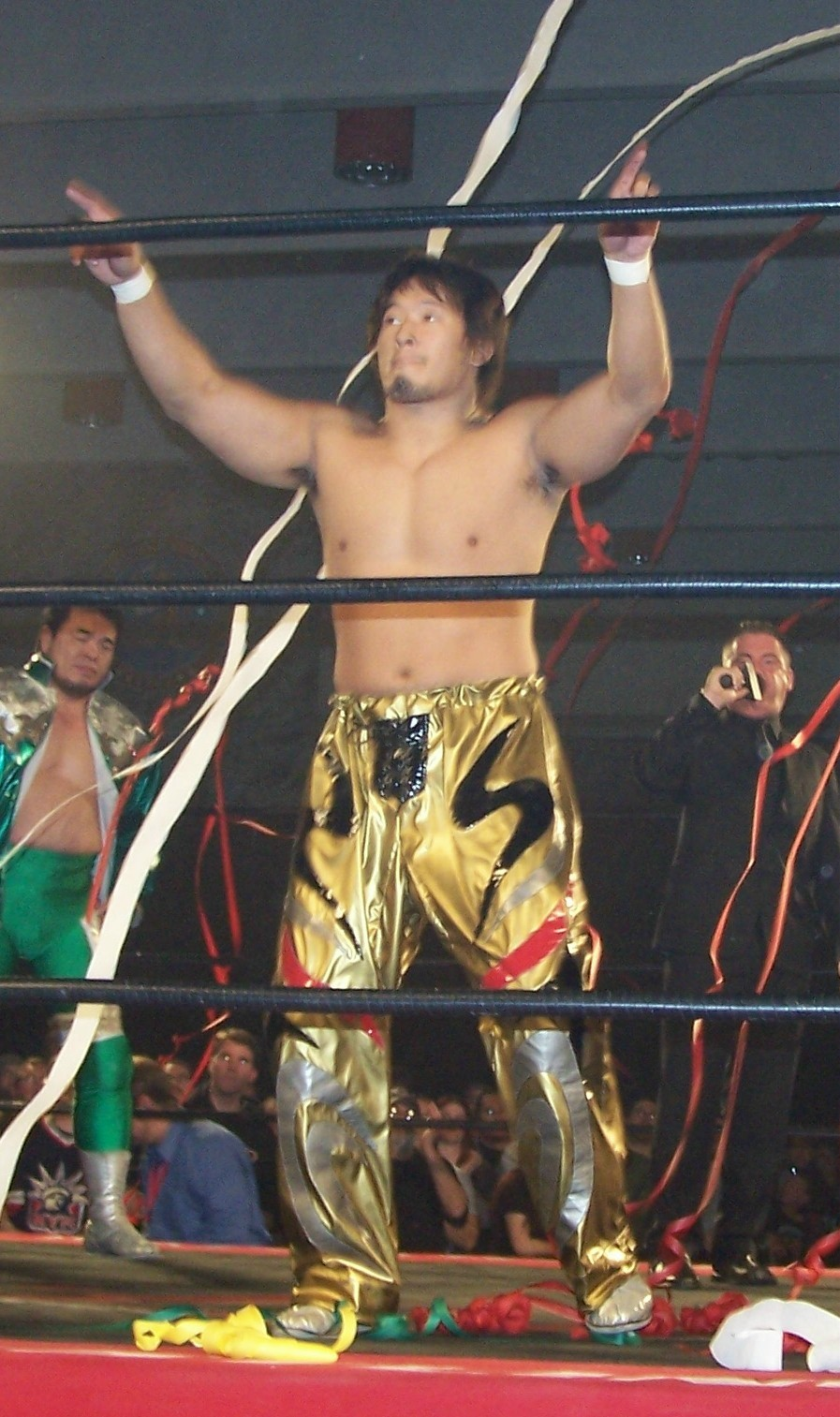
- Naomichi Marufuji, main event participant
- Promotion(s): AAA; Pro Wrestling Noah; Pro Wrestling Sem
- Date: September 3, 2007
- City: Tokyo, Japan
- Venue: Differ Ariake Arena
- Attendance: 1,400

Pay-per-view chronology
← Previous; Triplemanía XV	Next → Verano de Escándalo

TripleSEM was a professional wrestling major show event produced in cooperation between Pro Wrestling Noah and AAA on September 3, 2007, held in Tokyo, Japan and shown live on Gaora TV. The show is so far the only joint NOAH/AAA promoted show, but as the companies still work together there is potential for further joint shows in the future. The show was held under NOAH's "Pro Wrestling SEM" banner, a subdivision of NOAH dedicated to training younger wrestlers. The main event saw Los Hell Brothers (Charly Manson, Chessman and Cibernético) (representing AAA) wrestle to a no contest against Mushiking Terry, Naomichi Marufuji and Ricky Marvin (representing SEM/NOAH).

== Background ==
In the weeks leading up the event AAA had sent four wrestlers, Laredo Kid, El Oriental, Histeria and Antifaz to compete on NOAH's 2007 "Shiny Navigation" tour that ran over ten events from August 19, 2007, until September 2, 2007. The remaining AAA wrestlers travelled to Japan specifically for the TripleSEM event. The following are the results of the AAA wrestlers on the "Shiny Navigation" tour.

August 19, 2007

- El Oriental and Laredo Kid defeated Antifaz and Histeria

August 20, 2007

- El Oriental, Laredo Kid and Ricky Marvin defeated Antifaz, Histeria and Rocky Romero

August 22, 2007

- Ricky Marvin defeated Laredo Kid
- El Oriental, Kenta and Taiji Ishimori defeated Antifaz, Histeria and Rocky Romero

August 23, 2007

- Kotaro Suzuki and Ricky Marvin defeated Antifaz and Histeria
- Kenta, Rocky Romero and Taiji Ishimori defeated El Oriental, Laredo Kid and Naomichi Marufuji

August 25, 2007

- El Oriental, Laredo Kid and Mushiking Terry defeated Antifaz, Histeria and Rocky Romero

August 26, 2007

- Laredo Kid and Ricky Marvin defeated Antifaz and Histeria
- Kenta and Taiji Ishimori defeated El Oriental and Naomichi Marufuji

August 28, 2007

- El Oriental, Laredo Kid and Ricky Marvin defeated Akihiko Ito, Antifaz and Histeria

August 29, 2007

- El Oriental, Laredo Kid and Ricky Marvin defeated Antifaz, Histeria and Rocky Romero

August 31, 2007

- Antifaz, Histeria and Rocky Romero defeated Akihiko Ito, El Oriental and Laredo Kid

September 2, 2007

- El Oriental, Laredo Kid and Taiji Ishimori defeated Antifaz, Histeria and Rocky Romero

== Event ==
The first match of the show featured four wrestlers from AAA's Mini-Estrellas division facing off in a Tag team match as Mascarita Divina and Octagóncito defeated Mini Abismo Negro and Mini Histeria when Octagóncito pinned Mini Histeria. Mini Histeria is the real life brother of NOAH mainstay Ricky Marvin. In the second match El Oriental teamed with Japanese female wrestler Chikayo Nagashima and Mexican Exotico Pimpinela Escarlata to defeat Takashi Sugiura, Cassandro and Faby Apache in just over 13 minutes when Pimpinella Escarlanta forced Cassandro to submit. The third match of the night featured a wrestler who had worked the entire "Shiny Navigation" tour, Laredo Kid and his regular partner from AAA, Super Fly (collectively known as Real Fuerza Aérea) take on and defeat the team of Atsushi Aoki and Ippei Ota. Real Fuerza Aérea had a chance to show off their high flying skills in front of an appreciative crowd with Super Fly performing a "Flying Space Tiger Drop" (running cartwheel back flip Over the top rope) and Laredo Kid winning the match after executing a 450° splash. In the penultimate match two AAA stables faced off with a team composed of AAA regular El Elegido teaming up with NOAH workers Kenta and Taiji Ishimori, in the only match where AAA and NOAH worked together as a team. the Mexican Powers (Juventud Guerrera, Joe Líder and Crazy Boy) defeated Los Vipers (Antifaz, Histeria and Fuerza Guerrera) and the AAA/NOAH team in just over 13 minutes. The highlight of the match was Crazy Boy executing a Moonsault off a platform at least 15 feet above the ring. The final match saw AAA's main tecnico (Face or good guy) group, Los Hell Brothers (Cibernético, Charly Manson and Chessman) face off against Mushiking Terry, Naomichi Marufuji and Ricky Marvin. After approximately 16 minutes of wrestling Antifaz and Histeria interfered in the match, causing a "no contest". After the match both teams beat up Antifaz and Histeria and then celebrated together at close of the show.

== Aftermath ==
While no further joint promotions between AAA and NOAH have happened since then AAA has sent wrestlers to work for NOAH in Japan and NOAH has sent wrestlers to work for AAA in Mexico, most notably Takeshi Morishima, Naomichi Marufuji, Ricky Marvin and Kenta.

== Results ==
No.	Results	Stipulations	Times
1	Mascarita Divina and Octagóncito defeated Mini Abismo Negro and Mini Histeria	Mini-Estrellas Tag team match	09:25
2	El Oriental, Chikayo Nagashima and Pimpinela Escarlata defeated Takashi Sugiura, Cassandro and Faby Apache	Six-man tag team match	13:09
3	Real Fuerza Aérea (Laredo Kid and Super Fly) defeated Atsushi Aoki and Ippei Ota	Tag team match	08:15
4	The Mexican Powers (Juventud Guerrera, Joe Líder and Crazy Boy) defeated Los Vipers (Antifaz, Histeria and Fuerza Guerrera) and El Elegido, Kenta and Taiji Ishimori	Three way tag team match.	13:23
5	Los Hell Brothers (Cibernético, Charly Manson and Chessman) vs. Mushiking Terry, Naomichi Marufuji and Ricky Marvin ended in a no contest	Six-Man tag team match	16:12
