= Triplemanía XVI =

2008 Lucha Libre AAA World Wide event

- The official Triplemanía XVI logo
- Promotion: Asistencia Asesoría y Administración
- Date: June 13, 2008
- City: Mexico City, Mexico
- Venue: Palacio de los Deportes
- Attendance: 19,000

Pay-per-view chronology
← Previous; Rey de Reyes	Next → Verano de Escándalo

Triplemanía chronology
← Previous; XV	Next → XVII

Triplemanía XVI was the sixteenth Triplemanía professional wrestling show scripted and produced by Asistencia Asesoría y Administración (AAA). The show took place on June 13, 2008 in Mexico City, Mexico. The show was available on pay-per-view (PPV) in Mexico, the first Triplemanía show to be offered on PPV. The main event featured a singles match for the AAA Mega Championship. Champion Cibernético defended against El Zorro.

The show also featured the surprise return of Silver King, who teamed up with Chessman and La Parka, only to lose to La Legión Extranjera (Bobby Lashley, Electroshock and Kenzo Suzuki) in the semi-main event of the show. The show also included a hardcore match between Vampiro and El Mesías, as well as a Lucha de Apuestas, or "bet match", where sisters Faby Apache and Mari Apache both put their hair on the line for the match. The show include four additional matches.

== Production ==
=== Background ===
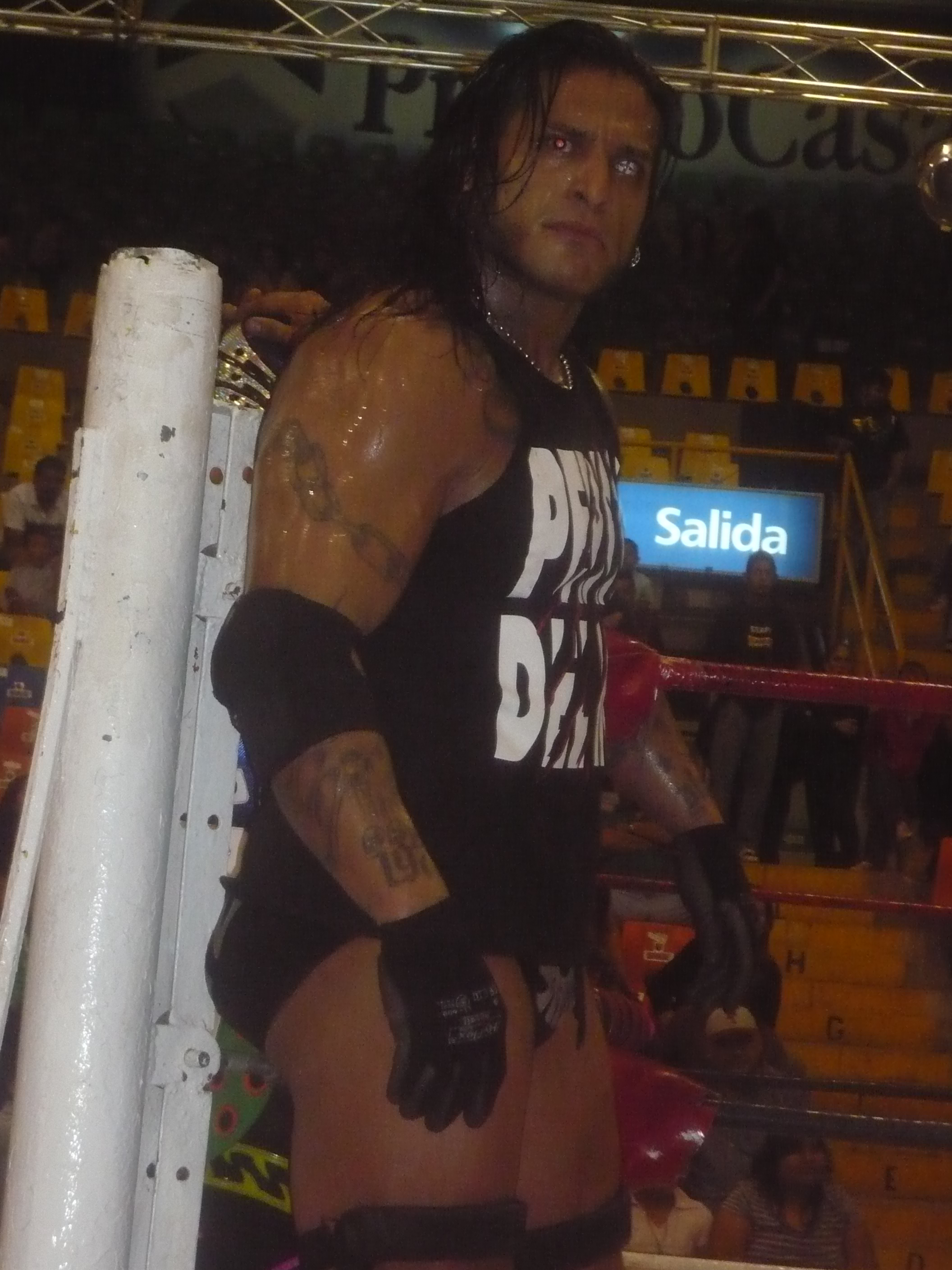
Cibernético reigning AAA Mega Champion going into the event.

In early 1992 Antonio Peña was working as a booker and storyline writer for Consejo Mundial de Lucha Libre (CMLL), Mexico's largest and the world's oldest wrestling promotion, and was frustrated by CMLL's very conservative approach to professional wrestling, specifically the style of wrestling known as Lucha Libre (Spanish for "freestyle wrestling"). He joined forced with a number of younger, very talented wrestlers who felt like CMLL was not giving them recognition they deserved and decided to split from CMLL to create Asistencia Asesoría y Administración (AAA, or Triple A; Spanish for "Assistance, Assessment, and Administration"). After making a deal with the Televisa television network AAA held their first show in April, 1992. The following year Peña and AAA held their first Triplemanía event, building it into an annual event that would become AAA's Super Bowl event, similar to the WWE's WrestleMania being the biggest show of the year. The 2009 Triplemanía was the 16th year in a row AAA held a Triplemanía show and the 21st overall show under the Triplemanía banner.

Up until Triplemanía XVI, the Triplemanía shows were taped for television broadcast, televised weeks after the show as part of AAA's regular television series. Triplemanía XVI was the first AAA show to also be offered as a pay-per-view (PPV) service on Mexican PPV channels. While PPV broadcasts of major events was common in the United States, going back to the mid-1980s, Mexican wrestling promotions only intermittently offered PPV options for their major shows prior to 2008. In subsequent years Triplemanía shows would be offered on PPV in Mexico and, for some events, outside of Mexico via internet or US PPV options.

The 2008 Triplemanía show ran live against Mexican rival promotion Consejo Mundial de Lucha Libre's (CMLL) Infierno en el Ring ("Inferno in the ring") major event. Both Triplemanía and Infierno en el Ring were held in Mexico City, Triplemanía at the approximately 20,000 seat Palacio de los Deportes arena while Infierno en el Ring was held at the 16,500 seat Arena México. The special entrance set, complete with large video walls and decorations, constructed specifically for Triplemanía XVI and the PPV production set up reportedly cost three million pesos ($290,000) and took 150 workers to prepare. Tickets for the event ranged from 150 pesos ($14.50) to 950 pesos ($92.02) for ringside seats. El Economista reported that 406 police officers, spread out over 52 units, provided security for the event.

=== Storylines ===
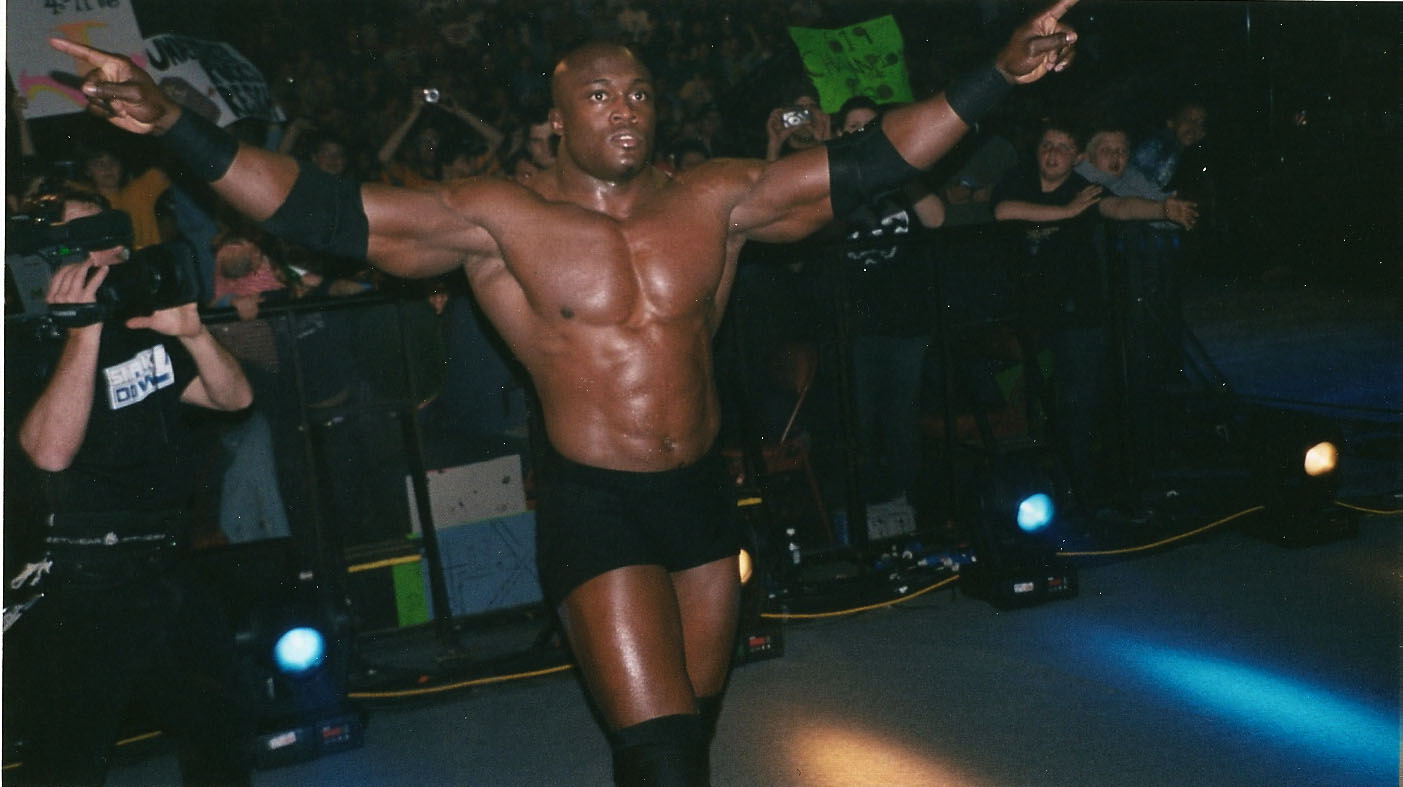
Bobby Lashley, brought to Mexico specifically for the show.

The Triplemanía XVI show featured a total of seven professional wrestling matches with where some wrestlers were involved scripted feuds. Wrestlers were portrayed as either heels (referred to as rudos in Mexico, those that portray the "bad guys") or faces (técnicos in Mexico, the "good guy" characters) as they followed a series of tension-building events, which culminated in a wrestling match or series of matches.

AAA Mega Champion Cibernético and challenger El Zorro had been rivals for almost a year prior to Triplemanía XVI, starting when both Cibernético and El Zorro targeted then AAA Mega Champion El Mesías. The championship feud build from the overarching AAA storyline featuring La Legión Extranjera ("The Foreign Legion") fighting against the Mexicans representing AAA. El Mesías, from Puerto Rico, was one of the major figures in La Legión Extranjera, teaming with US representative Sean Waltman and Japanese wrestler Kenzo Suzuki in the main event of Triplemanía XV. The trio lost to Los Hell Brothers (Cibernético, Charly Manson and Chessman). In September 2007 Los Hell Brothers teamed up with El Zorro to wrestle against the Black Family (Dark Cuervo, Dark Escoria, Dark Espiritu and Dark Ozz) in the main event of the 2007 Verano de Escándalo show. Zorro escaped early on in the match leaving his team at a disadvantage. After Los Hell Brothers won the match a man came to the ring wearing the "iron mask" but that turned out to be Konnan. When Zorro appeared on the scene moments later he turned on the tecnicos, attacking them with a kendo stick. After the show Zorro claimed that he was shown the light; he was actually a Spaniard, not Mexican, and was against the Mexican contingent in AAA. Joining Konnan's La Legión Extranjera.

After Zorro's turn the story was that Konnan considered El Zorro his "main man", the two even turned on El Mesías and La Secta del Mesías when El Mesías did not want to grant Zorro a title match. The storyline lead to a three-way world title match between Zorro, El Mesías and Cibernético at Guerra de Titanes ("War of the Titans"). During the match Cibernético received second and third burns to his back after La Legión put him through a table on fire (Cibernético was legitimately injured, it was not planned). A few weeks later, the storyline continued as El Zorro and the rest of La Legión Extranjera attacked and "injured" El Mesias during a show. The storyline was done partially to cover up the fact that El Mesias was returning Puerto Rico, as well as to help establish El Zorro as a top rudo in AAA. At the 2008 Rey de Reyes ("King of Kings") El Zorro won the Rey de Reyes tournament, while Cibernético finally defeated El Mesías to win the AAA Mega Championship. With his victory in the Rey de Reyes tournament El Zorro also earned a championship match at Triplemanía XVI. The original plan for the main event was to have AAA promoter Joaquín Roldán at ringside for the match, but the Mexico City boxing and wrestling commission would not allow it because he was not a licensed active competitor and the plan included Roldán getting physically involved.

Another featured match of Triplemanía XVI was a long-running "family feud" between sisters Mari Apache and Faby Apache that also included their father, Gran Apache, Faby's husbandBilly Boy their son Marvin "Apache". The storyline started out in 2005 with Billy Boy approaching the ring when Faby Apache was in a match. He usually carried flowers with him, and at times even carrying signs where he professed his love. The two had dated for years in real life prior to the storyline, and had in fact gotten married around the same time, writing their real life relationship into a storyline. The problems began when Faby Apache's father, Gran Apache, objected to the relationship and attacked Billy Boy because he was not "worthy" of his daughter, he was not tough enough for Gran Apache's liking. The Family feud stretched out for several years and even had the birth of Faby and Billy Boy's son Marvin incorporated into the storyline. The feud saw Gran Apache defeat Billy Boy in a match where he would be forced to not have anything to do with either Faby Apache or his son. Following the loss the storyline was that Billy Boy was so depressed that he caused his team Los Barrio Boys to lose several matches, this in turn, led to Alan and Decnnis turning on Billy Boy, taking Gran Apache's side in the storyline. On May 28, 2008 Faby Apache defeated Ayako Hamada and Mari Apache to win the 2008 Reina de Reinas ("Queen of Queens") tournament, moving the storyline onto focusing on Faby and her older sister Mari Apache, who chose to side with her father in the storyline. The two sisters agreed to put their hair on the line in a Lucha de Apuestas, or "bet match", at Triplemanía XVI.

One of the featured storylines that was supposed to culminate at Triplemanía XVI focused on the internal struggles of a rudo group known as Los Vipers, initially between Los Vipers leader Abismo Negro and Black Abyss, a wrestler using a very similar ring character. Initially, it was believed that the Black Abyss character was introduced due to rumors of Abismo Negro jumping to CMLL or to cover several no-shows. During that time Mr. Niebla had begun challenging Abismo Negro's position as the leader of Los Vipers, backing Black Abyss in the feud. At the 2008 Rey de Reyes show Abismo Negro lost due to interference from Black Abyss. The tension led to Abismo Negro and Mr. Niebla physically fightighting each other over the leadership, wrestling in matches where the Los Vipers leadership was on the line. Abismo Negro won the matches, but each time AAA head booker Joaquín Roldan announced that the decision had been overturned for various reasons. After the second match the rest of Los Vipers turned on Abismo Negro and kicked him out of the group, making Mr. Niebla their leader instead. The storyline was supposed to end in a Luchas de Apuestas match between Niebla and Negro at Triplemanía XVI. Later on the match was changed to a multi-man steel cage match including all of Los Vipers (Mr. Niebla, Black Abyss, Psicosis II and Histeria) and Abismo Negro with the last person in the cage being forced to unmask A few days before the show the steel cage match as canceled with AAA claiming that Abismo Negro had suffered a neck injury.

== Event ==
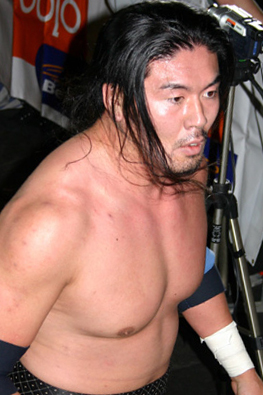
Kenzo Suzuki, part of La Legión Extranjera

For the opening match Laredo Kid was originally scheduled to be part of the match, but for unexplained reasons did not work the match, leaving his fellow Real Fuerza Aérea ("Royal Air Force") members Aero Star, El Ángel, and Super Fly one man short as they faced off against The Black Family (Dark Cuervo, Dark Escoria, Dark Espiritu and Dark Ozz).

Mr. Niebla was originally scheduled to compete in the second match of the night, but instead, he quit AAA, and made his CMLL return at Infierno en el Ring that same night. Later on Mr. Niebla later stated that he left AAA because the big mask vs. mask match he was promised fell through as Abismo Negro was unable to work the Triplemanía match. Histeria replaced Mr. Niebla in the six-man tag team match where Los Vipers lost to Alan Stone, Octagón, and Brazo de Plata when Octagón pinned Histeria.

In the fourth match of the night sisters Faby and Mari Apache squared off, fighting each other with their hair on the line. Billy Boy was on the corner of his wife Faby Apache, while Gran Apache was in Mari Apache's corner for the match. The match ended with Faby Apache pinning her older sister Mari Apache. A visibly emotional Gran Apache entered the ring before Mari Apache got her hair shaved off, pleading with the officials and the crowd to have HIS hair shaved off instead, pleading for his family to reunite. As Gran Apache had his hair shaved off the Apache sisters put their differences aside, hugging their father, with Billy Boy joining in moments later, calling a truce to the long-running feud.

According to AAA, the fifth match of the night, a hardcore match, had a fifteen-minute time limit imposed on it by the Mexico City boxing and wrestling federation, despite such matches normally not having a time limit. The added stipulation allowed AAA to have Vampiro and El Mesías, within having a conclusive winner of the match, allowing them to extend the feud. The two were fighting on the outside of the ring when the time expired, resulting in a draw.

For the semi-final match, Charly Manson, using a wheelchair, entered the arena to introduce the luchador sorpresa ("surprise wrestler") that had been advertised and Chessman and La Parka's tag team partner. AAA played "Bad Medicine" over the PA system, normally the theme song of Dr. Wagner Jr. (who was wrestling for CMLL), as they introduced Dr. Wagner Jr.'s brother Silver King as the surprise wrestler, confirming rumors reported by newspapers earlier in the day. Silver King surprised everyone by wearing his wrestling mask, after not having worn it for over 20 years. In Lucha Libre it is normally not allowed for a wrestler to resume wearing a mask they have previously lost in a Lucha de Apuestas, but for this occasion Silver King and AAA ignored the tradition. The match ended when Suzuki hit Silver King with a low blow behind the referee's back and pinned him, winning the match for his side.

In the main event Cibernético had the odds stacked against him, starting with El Tirantes being named the referee, El Tirantes played the role of a crooked referee who supported La Legión Extranjera whenever he had a chance. During the match against El Zorro, El Tirantes was knocked out by accident, leaving the match unsupervised for a short while. When El Zorro covered Cibernético, Konnan (El Zorro's corner man) took off his shirt to reveal a referee's shirt underneath. The ploy failed as Cibernético kicked out before the three count. Moments later El Hijo del Tirantes ("Son of El Tirantes") came to the ring to officiate the match fairly and without bias. Moments later Cibernético pinned El Zorro to retain the championship.

== Aftermath ==
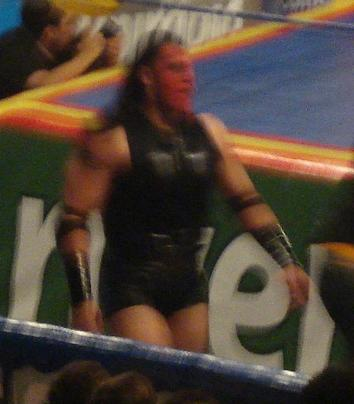
Chessman, the next challenger for the AAA Mega Championship.

In the lead up to AAA's next major event Verano de Escándalo ("Summer of Scandal") Cibernético's Los Hell Brothers teammate Chessman won an elimination match to earn a shot at the AAA Mega Championship held by Cibernético. Cibernético congratulated his partner for the victory but did not agree to a date for Chessman's title match. The tension came to a head in September after Cibernético came to the ring to congratulate Chessman on a recent win. Charly Manson came to the ring to try and mediate between the two, trying to keep the peace, but when Manson could not pick sides, Los Hell Brothers disbanded. With the split of Los Hell Brothers, Chessman became a Rudo and the title match was scheduled for Verano de Escandalo. Cibernético retained the championship in a very close match. Chessman was later given another match for the AAA Mega Championship, a match that also included El Zorro, which took place at the 2008 Antonio Peña Memorial Show, a match Cibernético won by pinning El Zorro.

The predominant storyline after Triplemanía XVI featured the Konnan-led La Legión Extranjera group as they continued their efforts to take control of AAA. By winning the main event of the Antonio Peña Memorial Show the storyline was that La Legión Extranjera was now running AAA, completing their takeover. One of the storyline effects of the take over by Konnan and his group was that Cibernético announced that he was leaving AAA, vacating the AAA Mega Championship in the process. The storyline was pushed as supposedly being real, something that was further enhanced by Cibernético working on the independent circuit from December 2008, until returning to AAA in April 2009.

As a follow-up to the time-limit draw between Vampiro and El Mesías, the two faced off in an extreme rules match on AAA's Sin Límite television taping on July 25. That match ended in a 25-minute time-limit draw. The inconclusive ended lead to AAA booking the rematch between the two as the main event of the 2008 Verano de Escándalo show, making the match a steel cage "street fight" match, ensuring that there would be a winner. At Verano de Escándalo El Mesías defeated Vampiro to end the storyline between the two.

While the Apaches reunited at the show, the storyline didn't end there. Later in 2008 Billy Boy returned to AAA, wearing a mask to keeping his true identity secret as he wrestled under the name "Alfa". He used the ruse to try to gain Gran Apache's respect. The ploy worked to the point where Gran Apache stated that Alfa would make a good husband for Faby Apache. After hearing that Billy Boy unmasked himself and reunited with Faby Apache and Marvin. The ruse did not please Gran Apache, who still did not like Billy Boy. During the 2008 Guerra de Titanes show Billy Boy came to Faby Apache's aid after she lost a match. The frustration of the loss made Faby Apache slap Billy Boy, which in turn caused Billy Boy to attack her. During an in-ring celebration of Gran Apache's 50 years in professional wrestling Billy Boy attacked his father-in-law with a steel chair, reversing the roles of Billy Boy and Gran Apache at that point in the storyline. In the spring of 2010 Aero Star was brought into the family feud, portraying a new love interest for Faby Apache. To begin with, Billy Boy acted like he did not care, stating that he had moved on as well and found a new love in Sexi Star. During a show Aero Star came to the ring and asked Gran Apache's permission to ask Faby Apache out. When Gran Apache was about to say yes Billy Boy ran to the ring and attached Aero Star. This led to Faby, Sexi Star, Billy Boy and Aero Star being booked in an inter-gender Lucha de Apuesta steel cage match where the last person in the ring would either have their hair shaved off (Faby Apache or Billy Boy) or be forced to unmask (Aero Star or Sexi Star). The match came down to Faby Apache and Billy Boy in the cage with Faby Apache pinning Billy to win the match. Following the Apuesta loss the storyline has focused more on Faby Apache and Sexi Star than Billy Boy.

With Joe Lider turning on the Mexican Powers and Nicho el Millonario turning on La Familia the two, along with X-Fly, formed a new group known as La Hermandad 187 ("The 187 Brotherhood"), fighting with both the Mexican Powers and La Familia de Tijuana. Nicho and Lider won a Ladder match at Verano de Escándalo defeating the Mexican Powers (Crazy Boy and Último Gladiador), La Familia de Tijuana (Extreme Tiger and Halloween), and The Hart Foundation 2.0 (Jack Evans and Teddy Hart) to win the AAA World Tag Team Championship.

Triplemanía XVI would later be released on DVD through Televisa Home Entertainment.

== Results ==
No.	Results	Stipulations	Times
1	The Black Family (Dark Cuervo, Dark Escoria, Dark Espiritu and Dark Ozz) defeated Real Fuerza Aérea (Aero Star, El Ángel, and Super Fly)	Four-versus-three-man "Lucha Libre rules" tag team match	—
2	Alan Stone, Octagón, and Brazo de Plata defeated Los Vipers Revolution (Black Abyss, Psicosis, and Histeria)	Six-man "Lucha Libre rules" tag team match	—
3	The Mexican Powers (Crazy Boy, Último Gladiador and Ricky Marvin) defeated La Legión Extranjera (Bryan Danielson, Jack Evans and Teddy Hart) and La Familia de Tijuana (Extreme Tiger, Halloween and T.J. Xtreme)	Three way tag team elimination match	14:40
4	Faby Apache defeated Mari Apache	Best two out of three falls Lucha de Apuestas "Hair vs. Hair" match	12:00
5	Vampiro vs. El Mesías ended in a time limit draw	Hardcore Match	15:00
6	La Legión Extranjera (Bobby Lashley, Electroshock and Kenzo Suzuki) defeated Chessman, La Parka and Silver King – (Kenzo Suzuki pinned Silver King)	Six-man "Lucha Libre rules" tag team match	13:17
7	Cibernético (c) defeated El Zorro	Singles match for the AAA Mega Championship	11:38
(c) / – the champion(s) heading into the match
