= Rey de Reyes (2008) =

2008 Lucha Libre AAA World Wide event

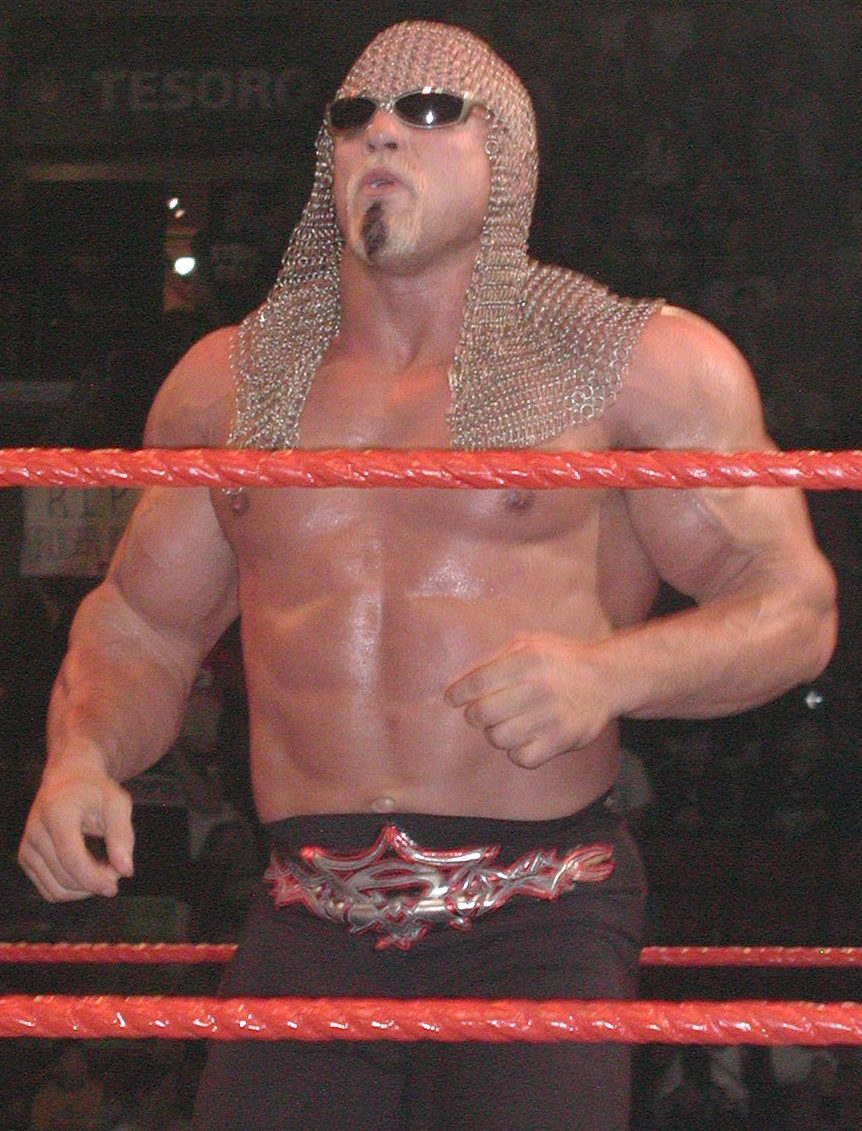
- Scott Steiner, made a one-time appearance for AAA
- Promotion: Asistencia Asesoría y Administración
- Date: March 16, 2008
- City: Monterrey, Nuevo León, Mexico
- Venue: Plaza de Toros Lorenzo Garza

Event chronology
← Previous; Guerra de Titanes	Next → Triplemanía XVI

Rey de Reyes chronology
← Previous; 2007	Next → 2009

The Rey de Reyes 2008 (Spanish for "King of Kings") was the 12th annual Rey de Reyes professional wrestling tournament and show, produced by the Mexican wrestling promotion Asistencia Asesoría y Administración (AAA). The event took place on March 18, 2007 in the Plaza de Toros Lorenzo Garza arena in Monterrey, Nuevo León, Mexico. The main focus of the 2008 Rey de Reyes show was the twelfth annual Rey de Reyes tournament and a match between the top technico Cibernético and the top rudo El Mesias for the AAA Mega Championship which El Mesias held going into the event. The undercard included four qualifying matches for the Rey de Reyes leading to the traditional four man elimination match that led to the crowning of that year's Rey de Reyes. The undercard also saw the continuing feud between Konnan’s La Legión Extranjera (Foreign Legion) and their altercations with wrestlers defending AAA. For this event La Legión Extranjera brought in two American wrestlers, Sabu and Scott Steiner, to strengthen their side. The other undercard storyline was that of Los Psycho Circus (a trio of Rudo wrestlers dressed up as clowns) competing with The Black Family.

== Production ==
=== Background ===
Starting in 1997 and every year since then the Mexican Lucha Libre, or professional wrestling, company Asistencia Asesoría y Administración (AAA, or Triple A; Spanish for "Assistance, Consulting, and Administration") has held a Rey de Reyes (Spanish for "King of Kings') show in the spring. The 1997 version was held in February, while all subsequent Rey de Reyes shows were held in March. As part of their annual Rey de Reyes event AAA holds the eponymious Rey de Reyes tournament to determine that specific year's Rey. Most years the show hosts both the qualifying round and the final match, but on occasion the qualifying matches have been held prior to the event as part of AAA's weekly television shows. The traditional format consists of four preliminary rounds, each a Four-man elimination match with each of the four winners face off in the tournament finals, again under elimination rules. There have been years where AAA has employed a different format to determine a winner. The winner of the Rey de Reyes tournament is given a large ornamental sword to symbolize their victory, but is normally not guaranteed any other rewards for winning the tournament, although some years becoming the Rey de Reyes has earned the winner a match for the AAA Mega Championship. From 1999 through 2009 AAA also held an annual Reina de Reinas ("Queen of Queens") tournament, but later turned that into an actual championship that could be defended at any point during the year, abandoning the annual tournament concept. The 2008 show was the 12th Rey de Reyes show in the series.

=== Storylines ===
The Rey de Reyes show featured ten professional wrestling matches with different wrestlers involved in pre-existing, scripted feuds, plots, and storylines. Wrestlers were portrayed as either heels (referred to as rudos in Mexico, those that portray the "bad guys") or faces (técnicos in Mexico, the "good guy" characters) as they followed a series of tension-building events, which culminated in a wrestling match or series of matches.

== Event ==
During the event Eddie Guerrero was inducted into the AAA Hall of Fame, honoring Guerrero for the contributions he had made to AAA during the early part of his career.

== Results ==
No.	Results	Stipulations
1	Principe Diamante, Street Boy and Tigre Cota defeated Black Mamba, Rio Bravo, and Tito Santana	Six-man "Lucha Libre rules" tag team match
2	Los Psycho Circus (Killer Clown, Psycho Clown and Zombie Clown) defeated the Black Family (Dark Cuervo, Dark Ozz and Dark Escoria)	Six-man "Lucha Libre rules" tag team match
3	Mr. Niebla defeated El Elegido, Mascara Divina and Zumbido: Zumbido eliminated El Elegido; Mr. Niebla eliminated Mascara Divina; Mr. Niebla eliminated Zumbido	Rey de Reyes qualifier Elimination match
4	Alan Stone defeated Decnnis, Pirata Morgan and Headhunter A: Headhunter A eliminated Decnnis; Pirata Morgan eliminated Headhunter A; Alan Stone eliminated Pirata Morgan	Rey de Reyes qualifier Elimination match
5	Abismo Negro defeated Psicosis, Aero Star and Brazo de Plata: Psicosis eliminated Aero Star; Brazo de Plata eliminated Psicosis; Abismo Negro eliminated Brazo de Plata	Rey de Reyes qualifier Elimination match
6	El Zorro defeated Scorpio, Jr., Billy Boy and Super Fly: Billy Boy eliminated Scorpio, Jr.; El Zorro eliminated Billy Boy; El Zorro eliminated Super Fly	Rey de Reyes qualifier Elimination match
7	Extreme Tiger defeated Chessman, Teddy Hart, Halloween, Juventud Guerrera and Joe Líder	Six-way Ladder Match
8	La Legión Extranjera (Electroshock, Kenzo Suzuki, Sabu and Scott Steiner) defeated El Alebrije, Charly Manson, Chavo Guerrero Sr. and Laredo Kid	Eight-man "Atómicos" tag team match
9	El Zorro defeated Abismo Negro, Mr. Niebla and Alan Stone: Mr. Niebla and Abismo Negro were eliminated together; El Zorro eliminated Alan Stone	Rey de Reyes Finals Elimination match
10	Cibernético defeated El Mesias (c)	Singles match for the AAA Mega Championship
(c) / – the champion(s) heading into the match

=== Tournament bracket ===
1st Round; Sin Limite: Rey de Reyes; March 16, 2008 (Aired: March 30)
El Elegido	6:42
Máscara Divina	—
Mr. Niebla	Win (Note: This was a four corners elimination match. Order of elimination: Zumbido, Máscara Divina, El Elegido)
Zumbido	—
Alan Stone	Win (Note: This was a four corners elimination match. Order of elimination: Decnis, Headhunter A, Pirata Morgan)
Decnis	—
Headhunter A	—
Pirata Morgan	5:55
Abismo Negro	Win (Note: This was a four corners elimination match. Order of elimination: Aero Star, Psicosis, Brazo de Plata)
Aero Star	—
Brazo de Plata	12:30
Psicosis	—
Billy Boy	—
El Zorro	Win (Note: This was a four corners elimination match. Order of elimination: Scorpio Jr, Billy Boy, Super Fly)
Scorpio Jr.	—
Super Fly	8:04

Final; Sin Limite: Rey de Reyes; March 16, 2008 (Aired: March 30)
Mr. Niebla	—
Alan Stone	20:35
Abismo Negro	—
El Zorro	Win (Note: This was a four corners elimination match. Order of elimination: Abismo Negro and Mr. Niebla by double countout, Alan Stone)
