= Aero Star =

Mexican professional wrestler (born 1984)

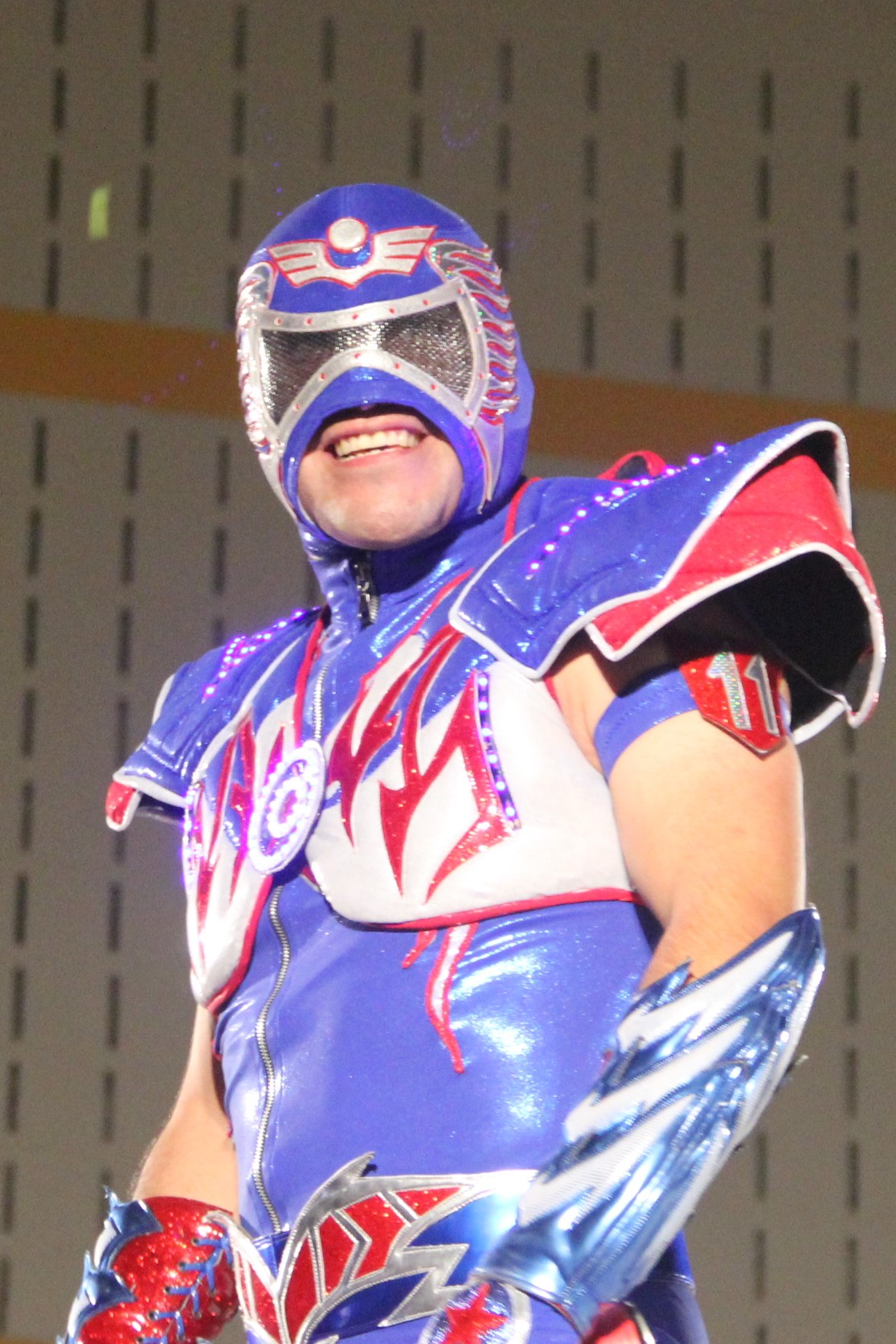
- Aero Star in 2015

Personal information
- Born: October 22, 1984 (age 42) Mexico City, Mexico

Professional wrestling career
- Ring name(s): Aero Star; Aerostar; Chiva Rayada II; El Acuático; El Chamagol
- Billed height: 1.69 m (5 ft 6 1/2 in)
- Billed weight: 68 kg (150 lb)
- Billed from: Mexico City, Mexico; El Cosmos (LU)
- Trained by: Gran Apache; Abismo Negro
- Debut: 2003

Aero Star (born October 22, 1984) is a Mexican professional wrestler signed to Lucha Libre AAA Worldwide (AAA) and WWE. Aero Star won the 2008 Alas de Oro tournament and is known for his high-risk moves off the top rope or off the arena's lighting structures. He is the final character created by AAA Founder Antonio Peña.

== Professional wrestling career ==
=== Lucha Libre AAA Worldwide and WWE (2003–present) ===
The wrestler that would later work as "Aero Star" joined Lucha Libre AAA Worldwide in 2003, initially working as "El Acuatico" (Spanish for "the Aquatic") in opening matches while receiving further training from Gran Apache and Abismo Negro. In mid to late 2003 he began working as the unmasked "El Chamagol" (inspired from Chilean soccer striker Sebastián González); as El Chamagol he teamed with Chiva Rayada and Nino de Oro to defeat Los Diabolicos (Ángel Mortal, Mr. Condor and Gallego) at the 2003 Guerra de Titanes show. In 2004 he was given a new ring persona as he took the part of "Chiva Rayada II" (literally "Striped Goat II"), teaming with Chiva Rayada to form a team of "Soccer goats" inspired by the Mexican football team Club Deportivo Guadalajara who wear red and white striped jerseys and are nicknamed "Los Chivas". Many young wrestlers have used the Chivas Rayada gimmick while still training so it is hard to establish exactly which matches he wrestled as Chiva Rayada II but he worked under the mask off and on between 2004 and 2006 while receiving further training from Abismo Negro.

After five years of AAA training he finally "graduated" and was given the "Aero Star" ring persona. Aero Star made his debut on December 20, 2006, and was promoted as the "Last creation of Antonio Peña", the AAA founder who had died only months earlier. Peña, Fernando Fuentes, and Aero Star's father had created the outfit, so the "last creation" label was not just a storyline but the truth. Aero Star was paired up with other young wrestlers who all wrestled a high flying style to form the group Real Fuerza Aérea ("Royal Air Force") along with Laredo Kid, Pegasso, Rey Cometa and Super Fly. When Laredo Kid was injured in 2007/2008 Aero Star and Super Fly became co-leaders of the group. By 2009 Pegasso and Rey Cometa left AAA. They were replaced with Argenis, sometimes Gato Eveready or Atomic Boy and El Ángel who himself left AAA in mid-2009. Aero Star made his Pay-Per-View (PPV) debut at AAA's 2007 Verano de Escándalo show where he teamed with Rey Cometa, Estrellita and Octagoncito losing to Alfa, Pirata Morgan, Faby Apache and Mini Chessman Real Fuerza Aérea made their PPV debut as a unit at the 2007 Guerra de Titanes where Aero Star, Rey Cometa and Super Fly defeated the Black Family (Dark Cuervo, Dark Escoria and Dark Ozz) Aero Star, El Ángel, Pegasso and Rey Cometa qualified for the 2008 Rey de Reyes tournament by defeating Los Night Queens (Jessy, Nygma, Polvo de Estrellas and Yuriko). Aero Star was eliminated in the first round of the tournament by Psicosis II. At Triplemanía XVI Aero Star, El Ángel and Super Fly lost to Dark Ozz, Dark Espirtu, Dark Cuervo and Dark Escoria of the Black Family.

On August 8, 2008, Aero Star won the second annual Alas de Oro ("Wings of Gold") tournament by outlasting a field of eight other wrestlers that included El Angel, Gato Eveready, Escoria, Extreme Tiger, Jack Evans, Super Fly, Teddy Hart and Último Gladiador. In early 2009 Aero Star gained a lot of attention by a series of high risk jumps moves off the 20 foot high lighting rigs that AAA use for their television tapings onto opponents on the floor. During a six-man tag team match between Aero Star, Super Fly and Laredo Kid against Los Psycho Circus (Killer Clown, Psycho Clown and Zombie Clown) at Triplemania XVII Aero Star wore a specially created mask where one side of the mask was a replica of Abismo Negro's mask, a homage to his trainer that had died a couple of months before the event. Aero Star was interjected in a storyline feud between Billy Boy and the Apache Family (Gran Apache, Mari Apache and Faby Apache) when he came to the rescue of his mentor after a match. Subsequently, he asked Gran Apache's permission to date Faby Apache, Billy Boy's ex-wife. The storyline has led to a Luchas de Apuestas Steel cage match with Aero Star teaming with Faby Apache against Billy Boy and Sexy Star at the 2009 version of Verano de Escándalo. At the event Aero Star, Faby Apache, and Sexy Star successfully escaped from the cage leaving Billy Boy head getting his hair shave. On September 7, 2009, Aero Star and Faby Apache defeated Cynthia Moreno and El Oriental to win the AAA World Mixed Tag Team Champion, Aero Star's first AAA championship. On June 2, 2010, Aero Star and Faby Apache lost the AAA World Mixed Tag Team Championship to La Legión Extranjera representatives Alex Koslov and Christina Von Eerie. On October 1, 2010, at Héroes Inmortales IV Aero Star won an eight-man torneo cibernetico to win the 2010 Copa Antonio Peña and Chris Stone's hair. After over a year of on and off teasing of a rudo turn, Super Fly finally turned on November 28, 2010, when he, along with members of La Milicia, attacked Aero Star and Octagón, revealing himself as the man who had attacked and bloodied Octagón prior to Héroes Inmortales IV. With his turn, Super Fly left Real Fuerza Aérea and joined La Milicia and its umbrella group La Sociedad. In July 2011, Aero Star and Jack Evans traveled to Japan to represent AAA in Pro Wrestling Noah's 2011 Nippon TV Cup Jr. Heavyweight Tag League. After two wins and two losses, the team finished third in their block, missing the finals of the tournament. By 2013, Real Fuerza Aérea was disbanded with Aero Star talking about the possibility of forming a new group with up-and-coming high flyers. In 2014, Aero Star re-ignited his rivalry with Super Fly, which culminated on December 7, 2014, at Guerra de Titanes, where Aero Star was victorious in a Lucha de Apuestas, forcing his rival to unmask. at Rey de Reyes 2015, Aero Star was involved in a match for the Rey de Reyes sword also including El Texano Jr., Psycho Clown, and El Mesias which Texano won.

=== American independent circuit (2015–present) ===
On August 28, 2015, Aero Star made his debut for Pro Wrestling Guerrilla (PWG) by entering the 2015 Battle of Los Angeles tournament, losing to Brian Cage in his first round match. On September 4, Aero Star made his debut for another American promotion, Chikara, when he, Drago and Fénix entered the 2015 King of Trios tournament as "Team AAA". They defeated the Gentleman's Club (Chuck Taylor, Drew Gulak and The Swamp Monster) in their first-round match. The following day, Team AAA defeated the Nightmare Warriors (Frightmare, Hallowicked and Silver Ant) to advance to the semifinals of the tournament. On September 6, Team AAA first defeated reigning King of Trios winners, the Devastation Corporation (Blaster McMassive, Flex Rumblecrunch and Max Smashmaster), in the semifinals and then Bullet Club (A.J. Styles, Matt Jackson and Nick Jackson) in the finals to win the 2015 King of Trios. Aero Star returned to Chikara on September 3, 2016, entering the annual Rey de Voladores tournament and winning a four-way elimination match to advance to the finals of the tournament. The following day, Aero Star defeated Tony Nese to win the tournament.

=== All Elite Wrestling (2021) ===
On the November 3, 2021 episode of AEW Dynamite, Aero Star made his debut alongside Samuray Del Sol (formerly Kalisto), challenging FTR for the AAA World Tag Team Championship in a losing effort.

== Other media ==
In February 2017, Aero Star took part in a skit on Conan, welcoming Conan O'Brien to Mexico.

== Personal life ==
Growing up, his favorite luchadors were Atlantis and Rey Mysterio.

== Championships and accomplishments ==
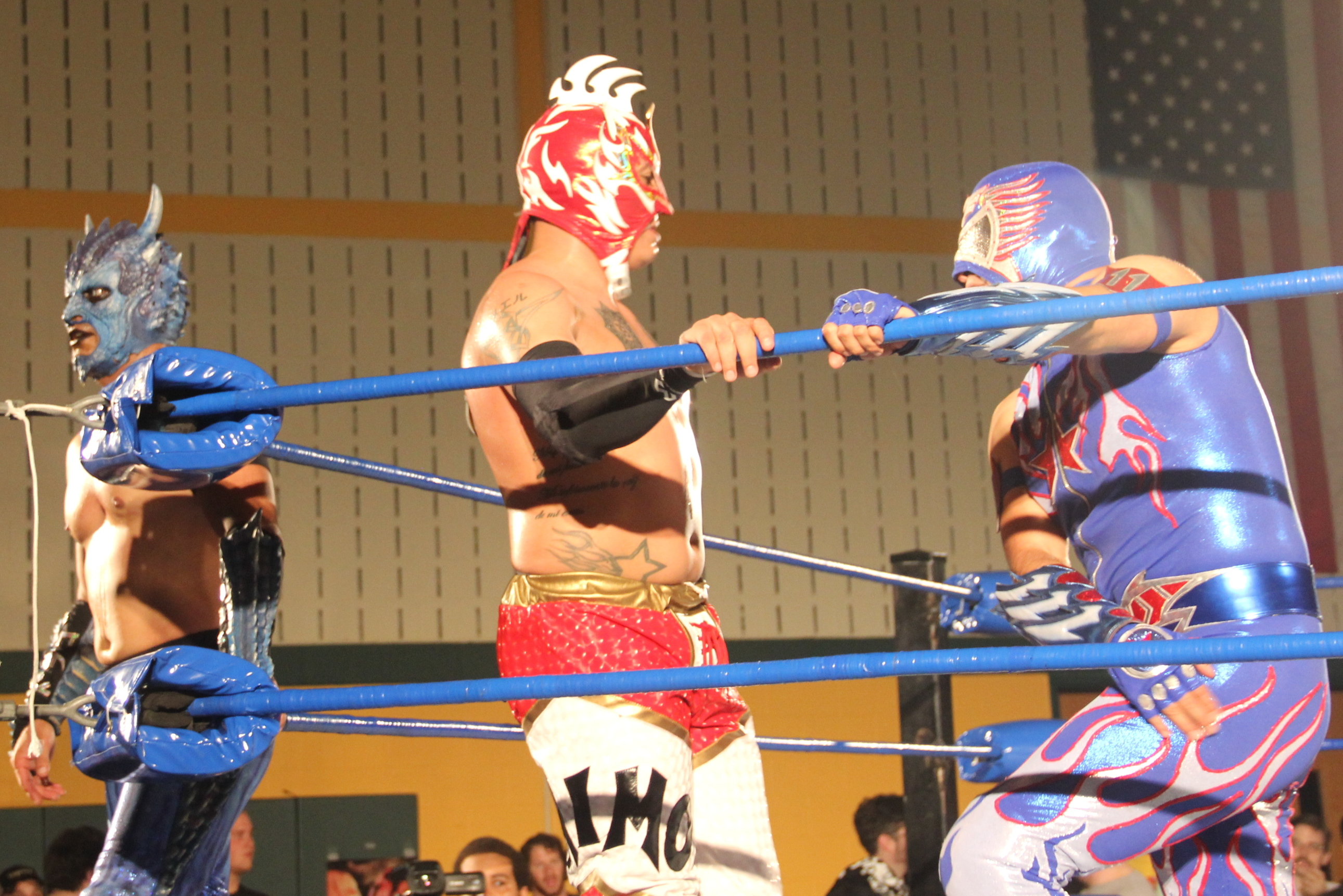
Drago (left), Fenix (middle) and Aero Star (right)

- Battle Championship Wrestling Australia
  - BCW Tag Team Championship (1 time) – with Drago
- Impact Wrestling
  - Impact World Cup of Wrestling (2019) – with El Hijo del Vikingo, Puma King and Psycho Clown
- Lucha Libre AAA Worldwide
  - AAA World Tag Team Championship (1 time) – with Drago
  - AAA World Mixed Tag Team Championship (1 time) – with Faby Apache
  - Alas de Oro (2008)
  - Copa Antonio Peña (2010)
  - Lucha Libre World Cup Best Match of the Night (2017) – with Drago vs. DJZ and Andrew Everett
  - Rey de Reyes (2019)
- Chikara
  - King of Trios (2015) – with Drago and Fénix
  - Rey de Voladores (2016)
- Lucha Underground
  - Lucha Underground Trios Championship (1 time) – with Drago and Fénix
- GALLI Lucha Libre
  - GALLI Tag Team Championship (1 time) – with Drago
- Pro Wrestling Illustrated
  - Ranked No. 166 of the top 500 singles wrestlers in the PWI 500 in 2015

== Luchas de Apuestas record ==
| Winner (wager) | Loser (wager) | Location | Event | Date | Notes |
|---|---|---|---|---|---|
| Aero Star (mask) | Billy Boy (hair) | Guadalajara, Jalisco | Guerra de Titanes | December 13, 2009 | (Note: This was a four-way match that also included Estrellita and Sexy Star.) |
| Aero Star (mask) | Chris Stone (hair) | Tamaulipas, Jalisco | Héroes Inmortales IV | October 1, 2010 | (Note: This was a torneo cibernetico, also involving El Elegido, Laredo Kid, Decnnis, Alan Stone, Billy Boy and Súper Fly.) |
| Aero Star (mask) | Súper Fly (mask) | Zapopan, Jalisco | Guerra de Titanes | December 7, 2014 | |
| Aero Star (mask) | Súper Fly (hair) | Monterrey, Nuevo León | Rey de Reyes | March 19, 2017 | |
| Aero Star (mask) | Monster Clown (mask) | Monterrey, Nuevo León | Triplemanía Regia | December 1, 2019 | (Note: Steel cage match, also involving Blue Demon Jr., Dr. Wagner Jr., Psycho Clown, Rey Escorpión and Texano Jr.) |
