= El Zorro (wrestler) =

Mexican luchador (born 1975)

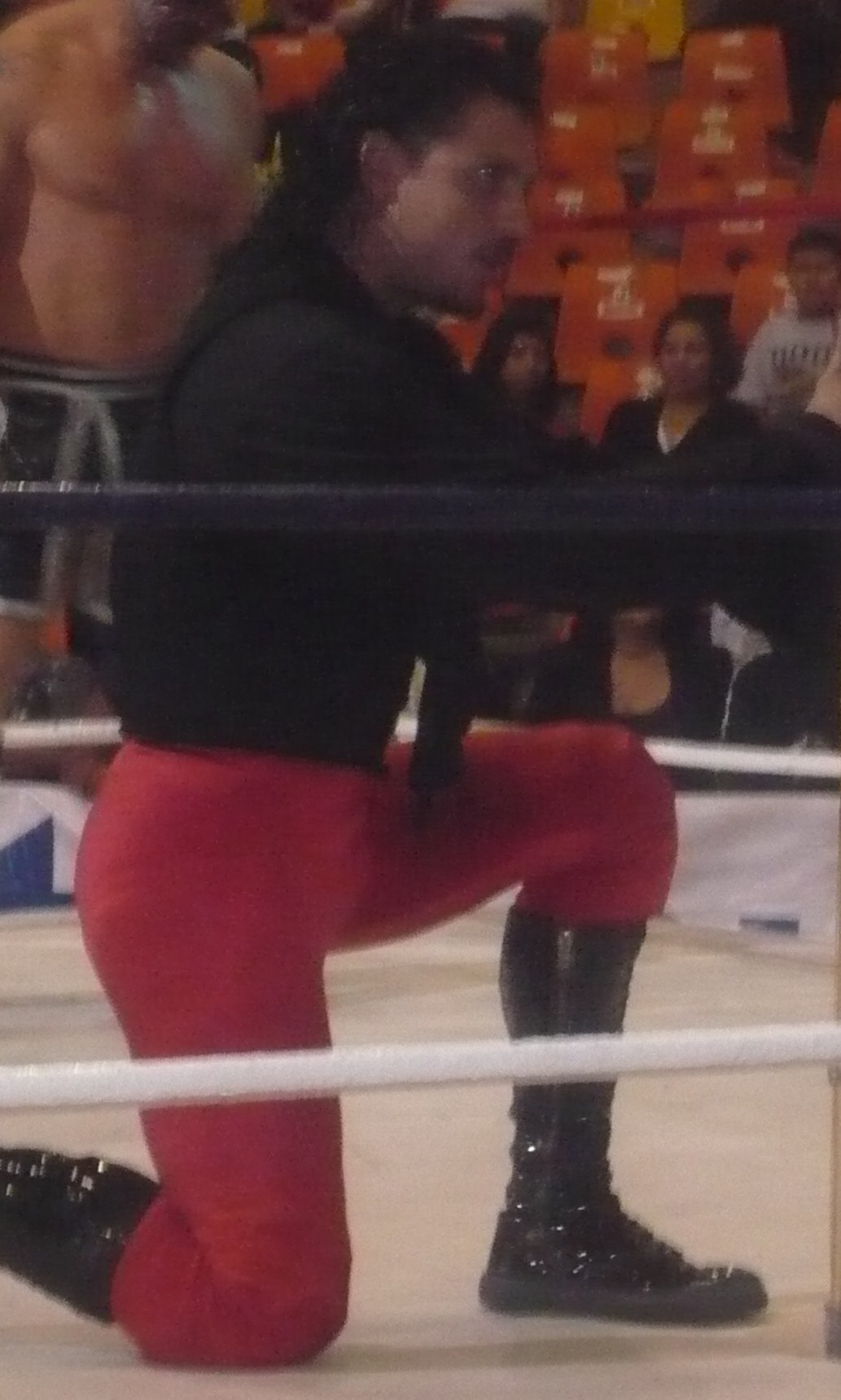

Personal information
- Born: Jesús Cristóbal Martínez Rodriguez; July 25, 1975 (age 51) San Juan de Dios, Guadalajara, Jalisco, Mexico

Professional wrestling career
- Ring name(s): The Chrizh; Cristobal Martinez; Jesus Cristobal; Junior; La Parka Negra (I); Neurosis; El Zorro; Zorro
- Billed height: 1.75 m (5 ft 9 in)
- Billed weight: 91 kg (201 lb)
- Billed from: Guadalajara, Mexico; Sevilla, Spain
- Trained by: Jorge Rodríguez; Flash
- Debut: October 2, 1993

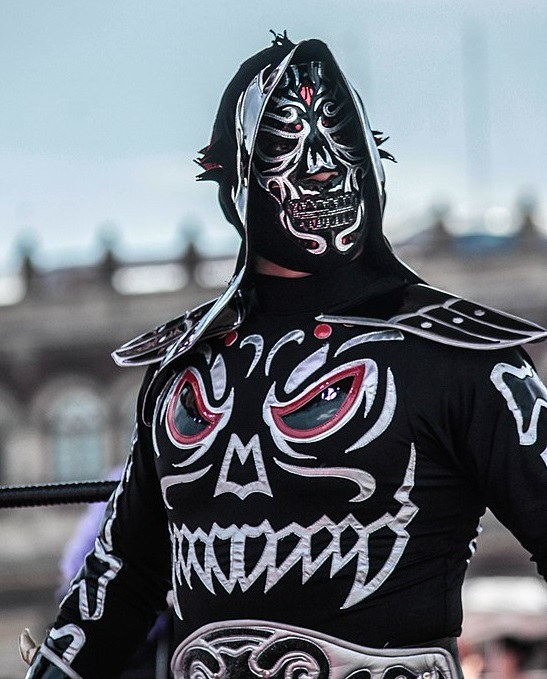
Martinez's wrestling gimmick, 2018

Jesús Cristóbal Martínez Rodriguez (born July 25, 1975) is a Mexican professional wrestler who is best known as El Zorro. His gimmick started out very similar to the fictional character Zorro complete with mask, but in recent years it has evolved and the mask has been eliminated. He is best known for his work in the Lucha Libre AAA Worldwide (AAA) promotion in Mexico, where he is a former AAA Mega Champion. He has in the past worked both in Europe, Japan and made a few brief appearances for the World Wrestling Federation show WWF Super Astros. He was the "Deputy leader" of the La Legión Extranjera faction headed by Konnan. In December 2012, Martínez was repackaged as La Parka Negra, the storyline nemesis of La Parka. He returned as El Zorro in October 2013, before departing the company in February 2017.

== Professional wrestling career ==
Martínez made his debut at age 17 at the "Plaza de Toros Jorge Rivera" in Zapopan, Jalisco working as an Enmascarado (masked wrestler) called Neurosis. In 1995 he changed identities and began working using another masked gimmick known as Junior instead. While working as "Junior" he managed to win the Occidente Light Heavyweight Championship from but lost his mask to Cesar Dantés (Younger brother of Apolo Dantés). In 1996 he began to work for the short lived "Promo Azteca" where he adopted the El Zorro gimmick from promoter Ricardo Reyes. In Promo Azteca he teamed up with another young wrestler, Tarzan Boy and won the WWO World Tag Team Championship. When Azteca folded Rodriquez began working for various companies all over Mexico, he even found himself making a couple of appearances on the World Wrestling Federation's Latin based Super Astros where he worked as Jesus Cristobal, essentially using the Zorro gimmick but without the mask.

=== AAA / Lucha Libre AAA Worldwide ===
==== Debut (2000–2002) ====
Zorro began working for AAA, later known as Lucha Libre AAA Worldwide some time near the beginning of the century, mostly working low card matches. In 2002 Zorro won the UWA World Light Heavyweight Championship, his first of five reigns with the title. Not long after winning the UWA title Zorro defeated Héctor Garza to also win the Mexican National Heavyweight Championship, thus becoming a double champion. Zorro's first big storyline with AAA was a feud with Mr. Águila over both the UWA Light Heavyweight title and the National Heavyweight titles, resulting in the two trading the titles back and forth several times in 2003 and 2004.

After the storyline with Mr. Águila ended Zorro was put together with Charly Manson, a member of La Secta del Mesías (the biggest rudo or "villain" group in AAA) who wanted the Mexican National Heavyweight title. Zorro kept the title away from Manson until the two met at Triplemania XIV inside a steel cage. In order to get the match Manson was forced to put his hair on the line making it a Luchas de Apuestas ("Bet fight") where the loser would get his hair shaved off. The match saw interference from La Secta del Mesías giving the victory and the National title to Manson.

==== The Man in the Iron Mask (2006–2007) ====
After shaving off Zorro's hair La Secta del Mesías placed a black mask on Zorro's head, the storyline was that the mask had an ancient Mayan curse on it and could not just be removed. In the weeks after La Secta put the mask on Zorro he seemed more erratic and not in control of himself. The storyline progressed with Manson revealing that he had mental control over Zorro through the mask and used that control to have Zorro turn on his friends and do his bidding. The mind-control aspects of the story were dropped and instead they explained it by the mask having a bad influence on Zorro. When Manson left La Secta and joined up with Los Hell Brothers, turning tecnico ("good guy") in the process and the storyline with Zorro hit a dead end as there was no possible payoff left any more. Eventually the writing staff figured out a way to end the "trapped in a mask" storyline by having Zorro overcome the "evil influences" so that he could remove the mask and present it to the leader of Los Hell Brothers (Cibernético) as a proof of his good intentions.

After removing the mask Zorro's character seemed a bit rougher, he his beard and hair had grown wilder while he wore the mask and he seemed more vicious in his attacks on the heels. After a while Zorro shaved and had his hair cut, reverting to the persona he had before the "evil mask" storyline began.

==== La Legión Extranjera (2007–2011) ====
At the 2007 Verano de Escandalo Zorro teamed with Los Hell Brothers in a Domo De La Muerte cage match against the Black Family. Zorro escaped early on in the match leaving his team at a disadvantage. After Los Hell Brothers won the match a man came to the ring wearing the "iron mask" but that turned out to be Konnan. When Zorro appeared on the scene moments later he turned on the tecnicos, attacking them with a kendo stick. After the show Zorro claimed that he was shown the light; he was actually a Spaniard, not Mexican, and was against the Mexican contingent in AAA. Joining Konnan's La Legión Extranjera ("Foreign Legion"), El Zorro dubbed himself "El Profeta de la Lucha Libre" ("The Prophet of Wrestling") and, as part of his new character, began making prophecies, often accurately predicting future events.

After Zorro's turn it became more and more obvious that Konnan considered El Zorro his "main man", the two even turned on AAA Mega Champion El Mesias and La Secta when Mesias did not want to grant Zorro a title match. The storyline lead to a three-way world title match between Zorro, El Mesias and Cibernético at Guerra de Titanes. During the match Cibernético received second and third burns to his back after La Legión put him through a table on fire (Cibernético was legitimately injured, it was not planned). At a television show taping a few weeks later a storyline played out where El Zorro and the rest of La Legión Extranjera attacked and injured El Mesias so bad that he was hospitalized. This was a storyline constructed to cover up the fact that El Mesias was returning to his native Puerto Rico for a few months. In the absence of both El Mesias and Cibernético Zorro became a main eventer, declaring himself the "Apostle of wrestling" (a play off Mesias claiming to be the Messiah of wrestling and Cibernético claiming to be a wrestling god). In early 2008 Zorro won the annual Rey de Reyes tournament defeating Abismo Negro, Mr. Niebla and Alan Stone in the finals. The night Zorro became the 2008 Rey de Reyes Cibernético also made his triumphant return, defeating El Mesias in the main event to win the AAA Mega title. Zorro immediately laid claim to the title, becoming the number one contender due to his Rey de Reyes victory. Zorro got his chance in the main event of Triplemania XVI on June 13, 2008 but lost to Cibernético. Zorro was also unsuccessful in his bid for the World title at the 2008 Antonio Peña Memorial show where he lost a triangle match that also included Chessman.

When Cibernético left AAA shortly after the memorial show the World title became vacant and Zorro immediately began campaigning for the title. With Konnan being in charge of the promotion after having won the storyline control of the company he booked El Zorro in a match against El Mesias for the vacant world title. As an added stipulation El Mesias would have to become a member of La Legión and do their bidding should he lose. the two met at Guerra de Titanes where Zorro was once again defeated in a world title match.

At Triplemania XVII, El Zorro turned on the Legion during the main event of the show. El Zorro came out wearing his old mask, handed Joaquin Roldan his kendo stick to help him keep Konnan from interfering in the main event. Keeping Konnan from interfering helped Roldan's Team AAA to win the match and take control of AAA away from the Legion. In October El Zorro once again turned rudo and re-joined La Legion Extranjera. In the summer of 2010 La Legión Extranjera merged with Los Perros del Mal, La Milicia and Los Maniacos to form La Sociedad. Afterwards, El Zorro, teaming with his Legión stablemate Hernandez, began feuding with La Hermandad 187 (Nicho el Millonario and Joe Líder). On September 14 El Zorro and Hernandez defeated La Hermandad 187 via disqualification and afterwards beat them down, injuring Nicho and ruining his and Líder's upcoming rematch for the AAA World Tag Team Championship. The feud came to an end on October 30, 2010, when El Zorro defeated Nicho in a Lucha de Apuesta weapons match to take his hair. After spending years working as a midcard talent, El Zorro was placed in a main event storyline in November 2010, when he teamed up with technico and AAA Mega Champion Dr. Wagner, Jr. in the 2010 Lucha Libre Premier parejas increibles tournament. After reaching the semifinals of the tournament, El Zorro turned on Wagner, Jr. and challenged him to a match for the World Heavyweight Championship at Guerra de Titanes. On November 28 El Zorro, Dr. Wagner, Jr., El Mesías and Electroshock faced each other in the Lucha Libre Premier semifinal four-way match. After eliminating Electroshock and Wagner, Jr., El Zorro and El Mesías faced each other in the final match, with El Mesías coming out victorious. In the days leading up to Guerra de Titanes, El Zorro made another prophecy, saying that he was going to leave the event with the AAA Mega Championship. On December 5 at Guerra de Titanes El Zorro defeated Dr. Wagner, Jr. with help from his La Sociedad stable mates to win the AAA Mega Championship for the first time. In January 2011, Martínez confirmed that he had signed a two-year non-exclusive contract with American promotion Total Nonstop Action Wrestling (TNA), with whom AAA had a working relationship with, and was just waiting for a start date with the promotion. He, however, never made his debut for TNA. El Zorro made his first title defense on March 18, 2011, at Rey de Reyes, defeating Los Bizarros member Charly Manson, who had recently been tormenting him by hinting at a return of the iron mask. Meanwhile, El Zorro's La Sociedad stablemate L.A. Park had earned himself a shot at the AAA Mega Championship, but Konnan, wanting to avoid dissension within his group, denied him his shot and instead named Manson the number one contender at Rey de Reyes. Following the event, El Zorro, having caught wind of Park's intention of going for his title, seemingly started interfering in Park's matches under his old mask, costing him back–to–back multi–man tag team matches at the April 27 and 30 TV tapings. On May 18, the rest of La Sociedad turned on El Zorro, after which Konnan announced that his new business partner, TNA founder Jeff Jarrett, would be challenging for his title at Triplemanía XIX. It was later revealed that the man who had attacked Park under El Zorro's mask was actually Charly Manson, who had been sent by Cibernético to cause dissension within the ranks of La Sociedad.

==== Ejército AAA (2011–2012) ====
On June 18 at Triplemanía XIX, El Zorro lost the AAA Mega Championship to Jarrett. At the July 9 tapings, El Zorro accepted Dr. Wagner, Jr.'s offer and joined the AAA technicos in the informal Ejército AAA ("AAA Army") stable. However, at the following taping on July 16, members of La Sociedad attacked El Zorro after a match and once again forced the iron mask over his head. On July 31 at Verano de Escándalo, someone dressed as El Zorro, including wearing his mask, interfered in the AAA Mega Championship match, helping Jarrett retain the title by hitting L.A. Park with his signature guitar. This person was later revealed as La Sociedad member Chessman, whom Konnan had sent to interfere in the match in order to have Park go after El Zorro instead of continuing to chase his stablemate's title. El Zorro continued representing AAA in matches against La Sociedad throughout 2012.

==== La Parka Negra (2012–2013) ====
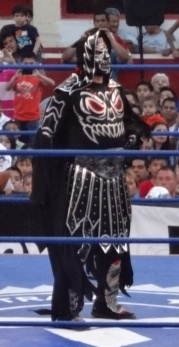
Martínez as La Parka Negra in March 2013

On December 2, 2012, at Guerra de Titanes, Martínez made his debut as the masked "La Parka Negra", the rudo counterpart of La Parka, in a six-man tag team match, where he, Pentagón Jr. and Silver King, were defeated by La Parka, Octagón, Octagón Jr. The storyline rivalry between La Parka Negra and La Parka heated up during AAA's first television taping of 2013 on January 18, when La Parka Negra and El Hijo del Perro Aguayo defeated La Parka and Cibernético in a No Disqualification match, during which La Parka Negra bloodied his rival after hitting him with a light tube.

==== Return as El Zorro (2013–2017) ====
In a twist, El Zorro returned to AAA on October 18, 2013, at Héroes Inmortales VII, during a first round match in the 2013 Copa Antonio Peña between La Parka and La Parka Negra, who was now portrayed by the former Último Gladiador. After walking around the ringside area, El Zorro slid his signature kendo stick inside the ring without making it clear who the weapon was meant for. La Parka ended up getting his hands on the weapon and used it to win the match. On December 8 at Guerra de Titanes, El Zorro turned rudo and joined the reformed La Sociedad. El Zorro later explained the turn, claiming that Konnan was the only person who cared for him and that he and the original La Sociedad were only trying to make him stronger, when the group turned on him in May 2011.

On January 22, 2016, at Guerra de Titanes, El Zorro, Dark Cuervo and Dark Scoria won the vacant AAA World Trios Championship. They lost the title to OGT (Averno, Chessman and Ricky Marvin) on November 4. In February 2017, El Zorro left AAA.

=== Independent circuit (2017–present) ===
Following his departure from AAA, El Zorro began working for The Crash, where he became part of Penta Zero M's La Rebelión stable, made up of former AAA wrestlers.

=== Consejo Mundial de Lucha Libre (2018–2019) ===
On June 29, 2018 Martínez worked his first match for Consejo Mundial de Lucha Libre in over 18 years, working under the name "The Chrizh". He teamed up with Cibernético, billed as "Ciber the Main Main" and "Sharlie Rock Star" (formerly Charly Manson), forming a trio known as "Klan Kaoz" (later renamed to "The Cl4n"). The trio made their CMLL debut in the main event of CMLL's weekly Super Viernes show, losing to Carístico, Valiente and Volador Jr. At the CMLL 85th Anniversary Show on September 14, 2018, The Cl4n defeated Los Guerreros Laguneros (Euforia, Gran Guerrero and Último Guerrero) to win the CMLL World Trios Championship.

== Championships and accomplishments ==
- AAA / Lucha Libre AAA Worldwide
  - AAA Mega Championship (1 time)
  - AAA World Trios Championship (1 time) – with Dark Cuervo and Dark Scoria
  - Mexican National Heavyweight Championship (3 times)
  - Rey de Reyes (2008)
- Comisión de Box y Lucha de Guadalajara
  - Occidente Light Heavyweight Championship (1 time)
- Consejo Mundial de Lucha Libre

- CMLL World Trios Championship (1 time) – with Ciber the Main Man and Sharlie Rockstar

- IWA Puerto Rico
  - IWA World Junior Heavyweight Championship (1 time)
- Pro Wrestling Illustrated
  - PWI ranked him #50 of the top 500 singles wrestlers in the PWI 500 in 2011
- Universal Wrestling Association
  - UWA World Light Heavyweight Championship (5 times)
- World Wrestling Organization
  - WWO Tag Team Championship (1 time) – with Tarzan Boy

== Luchas de Apuestas record ==
Winner (wager)	Loser (wager)	Location	Event	Date	Notes
César Dantés (hair)	Junior (mask)	Guadalajara, Jalisco	Live event	Unknown	
El Zorro (hair)	César Dantés (hair)	Guadalajara, Jalisco	Live event	Unknown	
El Zorro (hair)	El Texano (hair)	Tijuana, Baja California	Live event	November 30, 2001	(Note: Team lost a Relevos Suicidas match against Pirata Morgan and Principe Arandu.)
El Zorro (hair)	El Brazo (hair)	Morelos, Mexico	Live event	November 25, 2002	
El Zorro (hair)	Hijo del Enfermero (hair)	Tijuana, Baja California	Live event	July 11, 2003	
Charly Manson (hair)	El Zorro (hair)	Naucalpan, Mexico State	Triplemanía XIV	June 18, 2006	(Note: Last Man Standing steel cage match)
El Zorro (hair)	Chessman (hair)	Naucalpan, Mexico State	Antonio Peña Memorial Show (2007)	October 7, 2007	(Note: Six-man Domo De La Muerte match that also included Abismo Negro, Electroshock, Cibernético and El Intocable.)
El Zorro (hair)	Nicho el Millonario (hair)	Ciudad Juárez, Chihuahua	Live events	October 30, 2010	(Note: Weapons match)
