= Verano de Escándalo (2011) =

2011 Lucha Libre AAA World Wide event

- Promotional poster featuring various wrestlers
- Promotion: AAA
- Date: July 31, 2011
- City: Guadalajara, Jalisco
- Venue: Plaza Nuevo Progreso
- Attendance: 9,000
- Tagline(s): La lucha libre está que arde ("Wrestling is hot")

Event chronology
← Previous; Triplemanía XIX	Next → Héroes Inmortales

Verano de Escándalo chronology
← Previous; 2010	Next → 2014

Verano de Escándalo (2011) was a major professional wrestling event produced by the AAA promotion, which took place on July 31, 2011, at the Plaza Nuevo Progreso in Guadalajara, Jalisco, Mexico. The title of the event, which has been AAA's annual summer show since 1997, is Spanish for "Summer of Scandal". The event featured seven matches with the main event featuring Los Perros del Mal and Los Psycho Circus facing each other in a Hair vs. Mask Lucha de Apuestas steel cage match, continuing the storyline rivalry, which started in October 2010. The event also featured Jeff Jarrett defending the AAA Mega Championship against Dr. Wagner Jr. and L.A. Park. The event took place only six weeks and four television tapings after Triplemanía XIX, an abnormally short amount of time between two major AAA events; for example there would be ten weeks between Verano de Escándalo and the following major event, Héroes Inmortales. Subsequently, AAA made the decision not to make the event a pay-per-view.

== Production ==
=== Background ===
First held during the summer of 1997 the Mexican professional wrestling, company AAA began holding a major wrestling show during the summer, most often in September, called Verano de Escándalo ("Summer of Scandal"). The Verano de Escándalo show was an annual event from 1997 until 2011, then AAA did not hold a show in 2012 and 2013 before bringing the show back in 2014, but this time in June, putting it at the time AAA previously held their Triplemanía show. In 2012 and 2013 Triplemanía XX and Triplemanía XXI was held in August instead of the early summer. The show often features championship matches or Lucha de Apuestas or bet matches where the competitors risked their wrestling mask or hair on the outcome of the match. In Lucha Libre the Lucha de Apuetas match is considered more prestigious than a championship match and a lot of the major shows feature one or more Apuesta matches. The 2011 Verano de Escándalo show was the 15th show in the series.

=== Storylines ===
The Verano de Escándalo show featured seven professional wrestling matches with different wrestlers involved in pre-existing, scripted feuds, plots, and storylines. Wrestlers were portrayed as either heels (referred to as rudos in Mexico, those that portray the "bad guys") or faces (técnicos in Mexico, the "good guy" characters) as they followed a series of tension-building events, which culminated in a wrestling match or series of matches.

In October 2010 the técnico group Los Psycho Circus (Monster Clown, Murder Clown and Psycho Clown) started a storyline rivalry with the rudo group Los Perros del Mal, which continued with Damián 666, Halloween and X-Fly ending Los Psycho Circus three-year-long undefeated streak in December, Super Crazy losing his hair in a steel cage Lucha de Apuestas in May and has included battles for both the IWRG Intercontinental Trios Championship, held by Los Psycho Circus, and the AAA World Trios Championship, for which Damián 666, Halloween and X-Fly defeated Los Psycho Circus at Triplemanía XIX. The rivalry continued at the July 9 tapings, when Los Psycho Circus defeated Los Perros del Mal representatives Halloween, Lizmark Jr. and Super Crazy in a six man tag team match. At the July 16 tapings, Los Perros del Mal first attacked the Mini-Estrella group Los Mini Psycho Circus after their debut match, before facing their rival group in a rematch of their Triplemanía XIX match, where the AAA World Trios Champions were once again victorious after X-Fly pinned Monster Clown. After the match Damián 666, Halloween and X-Fly once again unmasked all three of their rivals. On July 20, AAA announced that the two groups would face each other at Verano de Escándalo in a steel cage Hair vs. Mask match, where the last person left in the cage will lose his hair or mask. Meanwhile, Perros del Mal leader El Hijo del Perro Aguayo, who had recently been battling various problems related to his tumor treatment, announced that he was ready to make a comeback and named Verano de Escándalo'as a possible venue for his return. Damián 666 added to the speculation by suggesting that Aguayo could repeat his actions from past December's Guerra de Titanes, where he interfered in a steel cage match between the two groups, helping Los Perros del Mal hand Los Psycho Circus their first ever loss.

On June 18, 2011, at the press conference following Triplemanía XIX, AAA Latin American Champion Dr. Wagner Jr. challenged new AAA Mega Champion Jeff Jarrett to a match for his title, voicing his displeasure over the fact that the TNA wrestler had taken the title out of Mexico. At the TV tapings on July 9, Wagner declared himself the number one contender to Jarrett's title. In the match following the announcement, Wagner teamed with former AAA Mega Champion El Zorro against Jarrett and his La Sociedad stablemate L.A. Park. During the match Jarrett and Park had significant problems with each other, stemming first from a mistake made by Jarrett's wife Karen and then from El Zorro fooling Park into thinking that Jarrett had hit him with a chair. Eventually the match ended in a no contest, following interference from members of La Sociedad. At the July 16 tapings, La Sociedad leader Konnan announced that he would adding Park to the AAA Mega Championship match at Verano de Escándalo, making it a three–way match, as a way of ensuring that the title stayed in his group.

TNA's invasion of AAA continued after Triplemanía XIX with appearances by Mickie James, Abyss, Samoa Joe and Scott Steiner. James returned at the July 9 tapings, pinning AAA Reina de Reinas Champion Mari Apache in a tag team match following a kiss and Mickie–DT, the same way she had pinned Mari's sister Faby Apache at Triplemanía XIX. Following the match James compared Mari to a cow and challenged her to a match for the Reina de Reinas Championship. On July 20, AAA announced an eight–way match for the title at Verano de Escándalo, which included one surprise entrant. Abyss made an appearance at the same tapings, teaming with Chessman and Último Gladiador to face Joe Líder and AAA World Tag Team Champions Extreme Tiger and Jack Evans in a six man tag team match. Abyss won the match by pinning Líder after Black Hole Slamming him onto a pile of thumbtacks and afterwards also slammed Tiger onto them. On July 20, AAA announced that at Verano de Escándalo Abyss, Chessman, Extreme Tiger and Joe Líder would compete in a Monster's Ball match, Abyss' signature match from TNA. Surprisingly, it was announced by not only AAA, but also by Ticketmaster a few days prior to the promotion's official announcement, that the match would be for the AAA Cruiserweight Championship, despite the fact that Abyss was 55 kg (121 lb) over the cruiserweight weight limit and that, up until the announcement, Jack Evans was the reigning Cruiserweight Champion. At the time of Verano de Escándalo, Evans was on tour with Japanese promotion Pro Wrestling Noah. However, a few days later AAA no longer billed the match as being for the Cruiserweight Championship. Samoa Joe and Scott Steiner both appeared at the July 16 tapings, teaming with L.A. Park to defeat Dr. Wagner Jr., Electroshock and El Zorro, representing the informal Ejército AAA ("The AAA Army"), in a six man tag team match, when Joe submitted Electroshock. After the match, La Sociedad assaulted El Zorro and forced an iron mask over his head. When the mask was previously used in 2006, it had made El Zorro mentally unstable and forced him under the control of the men who had put it on him. On July 20 it was announced that Ejército AAA would seek revenge on La Sociedad at Verano de Escándalo in a match, where Drago, Electroshock and Heavy Metal would face Joe, Silver King and Último Gladiador.

At Triplemanía XIX it had been revealed that Los Bizarros member Taboo was in fact the brother of La Parka, the leader of rival group El Inframundo. After the event Parka announced that he no longer considered Taboo his brother and accused both him and Los Bizarros leader of Cibernético of ducking him, when it was announced that at the June 30 tapings, El Inframundo, represented by Parka, Dark Cuervo and Dark Ozz, would be facing the Los Bizarros trio of Billy el Malo, Charly Manson and Escoria in a six man tag team match. The match on June 30 ended in a disqualification, when Taboo attacked his brother with a chair. On July 16 Parka, Cuervo and Ozz faced Cibernético, Billy el Malo and Escoria in another six man tag team match. This time Taboo hit his brother with the blunt end of an axe, before Escoria pinned Cuervo for the win. On July 20 it was announced that at Verano de Escándalo, Parka would finally get his hands on Taboo, when El Inframundo, represented by Parka, Cuervo, Ozz and Dark Espíritu face Taboo, Cibernético, Billy el Malo and Escoria.

== Event ==
=== Preliminary matches ===
In the opening match of the evening, Los Mini Psycho Circus (Mini Monster Clown, Mini Murder Clown and Mini Psycho Clown) continued their undefeated streak by defeating Mascarita Divina, Mini Charly Manson and Octagóncito in a six man tag team match with a triple pin following three simultaneous splashes, followed by powerbombs.

The following match saw Mari Apache defending her AAA Reina de Reinas Championship in an eight–way elimination match against Cynthia Moreno, Faby Apache, Jennifer Blake, Lolita, Mickie James, Sexy Star and surprise entrant Exótico Pimpinela Escarlata, a man with a transvestite character. Throughout the match La Sociedad's own referee, Hijo del Tirantes, favored his stablemates Blake, James and Sexy and in doing so helped in the eliminations of Moreno and both of the Apache sisters. In the end, the match came down to two La Sociedad members, James and Sexy, and Pimpinela Escarlata. While Faby Apache distracted Hijo del Tirantes, her sister re-entered the ring, performed a double clothesline on the La Sociedad duo and a sitout powerbomb on Sexy Star. After the Apaches cleared the ring, Escarlata pinned Sexy to eliminate her from the match. Shortly afterwards, Escarlata accidentally took out Hijo del Tirantes with a missile dropkick, which led to Mari once again entering the ring and giving him a senton bomb. This led to La Sociedad leader Konnan coming out and hitting Escarlata with a baseball bat. However, Escarlata was able to survive the following pin, as Hijo del Tirantes was not able to make the count and his replacement Piero took such a long time to enter the ring from the backstage area. As Escarlata surprised James with a schoolgirl roll-up, Konnan pulled Piero out of the ring and punched him in the face. James, who in AAA had developed a habit of surprising her opponents with a kiss prior to pinning them, was this time herself surprised by a kiss from Escarlata, who then used her disgust to his advantage and rolled her up with another schoolgirl, which led to Piero re-entering the ring and making the three count, while Konnan was preoccupied with tending to Hijo del Tirantes. With the win, Escarlata became the first man to ever hold the Reina de Reinas Championship. After the match, the Apaches and Lolita re-entered the ring to celebrate Escarlata's win over the TNA invader.

In the third match, La Sociedad representatives Samoa Joe, Silver King and Último Gladiador faced AAA representatives Drago, Electroshock and Heavy Metal. During the match, Nanyzh Rock, the valet of Heavy Metal, and Jennifer Blake, the valet of La Sociedad, came to blows with each other, while Metal's midget companion Lokillo entered the ring to confront the rudos. The match ended with Electroshock countering Samoa Joe's chokeslam and Último Gladiador's dive into cutters and then pinning his former Los Maniacos stablemate Silver King with a third cutter.

In the fourth match Los Bizarros faced rival group El Inframundo. The entire match was built around El Inframundo leader La Parka finally getting his hands on his brother, Los Bizarros member Taboo. After a bloody brawl, Parka was disqualified for excessive violence on his brother. While Taboo was stretchered backstage, the rest of Los Bizarros attacked their rivals, beating Parka with their signature axe, while taping his stablemates to the ring ropes. The segment ended with Los Bizarros tying Parka to a wooden cross.

The following match saw TNA worker Abyss facing La Sociedad stablemate Chessman and AAA's Extreme Tiger and Joe Líder in his specialty match, the Monster's Ball. At the end of the match, Nicho el Millonario, Líder's longtime tag team partner with whom he had held the AAA World Tag Team Championship for 551 days and who had turned on him in the aftermath of Triplemanía XIX, entered the ring and attacked his former partner with a chair, before slamming him through a burning table. Chessman took advantage of the opportunity and pinned Líder to win the match.

=== Main event matches ===
The second title match of the evening saw Jeff Jarrett defending the AAA Mega Championship against Dr. Wagner Jr. and L.A. Park in a three–way elimination match. The first elimination took place when Jarrett's wife Karen entered the ring, gave Park a chair and told him to use it on Wagner Jr. Park, however, refused, threw the chair away and told Karen to exit the ring, which led to referee Hijo del Tirantes confronting him. As Wagner Jr. grabbed Karen, she kicked him in the groin, after which her husband performed his finishing maneuver, The Stroke, to eliminate the AAA Latin American Champion, leaving the two La Sociedad members to battle for the Mega Championship. With the crowd now firmly behind Park, he gave Jarrett a spinning headlock elbow drop, which led to Karen confronting and slapping him. As Park went to perform a powerbomb on her, someone dressed and masked as El Zorro entered the ring and hit him with Jarrett's signature guitar, allowing the TNA founder to retain his title.

After the match, La Sociedad leader Dorian Roldán, Konnan, Samoa Joe, Silver King and Último Gladiador entered the ring with Roldán informing his mother Marisela Peña Roldan, who had tried to fire him prior to Triplemanía XIX, that he could not be fired as he was one of the shareowners of the promotion. Konnan and Jarrett then tried to reconcile with Park, but he refused to do so. As La Sociedad was seemingly about to assault Wagner Jr., El Mesías, who had not made an appearance since Triplemanía, where he had lost his hair in a match against Park, came out to make the save and challenge Jarrett to a match for the AAA Mega Championship.

The main event of the evening featured Los Perros del Mal facing Los Psycho Circus in a six man tag team steel cage Hair vs. Mask match. In a bloody brawl, which featured tables, ladders and lamps used as weapons, Halloween was the first person to successfully escape the cage, followed by Monster Clown and Murder Clown. As Los Perros del Mal, now with a two–on–one advantage over Psycho Clown, was set to double team the lone clown, Damián 666 suddenly changed his mind and climbed out of the cage, abandoning his partner. This would eventually backfire as Psycho Clown was able to make a comeback with a powerbomb through a table, following interference from the already escaped Monster Clown, and escape the cage, leaving X-Fly inside and forcing him to have his hair shaved off. The event concluded with Los Psycho Circus celebrating their victory as the bitter X-Fly was shaved inside the cage.

=== Aftermath ===
On the September 10 edition of AAA's Sin Límite television program, the person who interfered in the AAA Mega Championship match dressed as El Zorro was revealed as La Sociedad member Chessman. Konnan's plan was to send L.A. Park on a "wild-goose chase" after El Zorro instead of continuing to chase his stablemate Jeff Jarrett's title.

== Results ==
No.	Results	Stipulations
1	Los Mini Psycho Circus (Mini Monster Clown, Mini Murder Clown and Mini Psycho Clown) defeated Mascarita Divina, Mini Charly Manson and Octagóncito	Six-man tag team match
2	Pimpinela Escarlata defeated Cynthia Moreno, Faby Apache, Jennifer Blake, Lolita, Mari Apache (c), Mickie James and Sexy Star	Eight–way elimination match for the AAA Reina de Reinas Championship
3	Ejército AAA (Drago, Electroshock and Heavy Metal) (with Lokillo and Nanyzh Rock) defeated La Sociedad (Samoa Joe, Silver King and Último Gladiador) (with Jennifer Blake)	Six-man tag team match
4	Los Bizarros (Cibernético, Billy el Malo, Escoria and Taboo) defeated El Inframundo (La Parka, Dark Cuervo, Dark Ozz and Dark Espíritu) via disqualification	Eight-man tag team match
5	Chessman defeated Abyss, Extreme Tiger and Joe Líder	Monster's Ball match
6	Jeff Jarrett (c) (with Karen Jarrett) defeated Dr. Wagner Jr. and L.A. Park: Order of elimination: Wagner Jr. (by Jarrett), Park (by Jarrett)	Three-way elimination match for the AAA Mega Championship
7	Los Psycho Circus (Monster Clown, Murder Clown and Psycho Clown) defeated Los Perros del Mal (Damián 666, Halloween and X-Fly): Order of escape: Halloween, Monster, Murder, Damián, Psycho; X-Fly lost his hair	Six-man tag team steel cage Lucha de Apuestas, hair-vs.-mask match
(c) / – the champion(s) heading into the match

Reina de Reinas order of elimination

1. Cinthia Moreno (by Mari Apache)
2. Lolita (by Jennifer Blake)
3. Jennifer Blake (Faby Apache)
4. Mari Apache (by Mickie James and Sexy Star)
5. Faby Apache (by Sexy Star)
6. Sexy Star (by Pimpinela Escarlata)
7. Mickie James (by Pimpinela Escarlata)
