= Triplemanía XXIII =

2015 Lucha Libre AAA Worldwide event

- Promotional poster featuring Rey Mysterio Jr., Myzteziz, El Patrón Alberto and Brian Cage
- Promotion: Lucha Libre AAA Worldwide
- Date: August 9, 2015
- City: Mexico City
- Venue: Arena Ciudad de México
- Attendance: 18,000-22,000

Pay-per-view chronology
← Previous; Verano de Escándalo	Next → Héroes Inmortales IX

Triplemanía chronology
← Previous; XXII	Next → XXIV

Triplemanía XXIII was a professional wrestling pay-per-view (PPV) produced by the Lucha Libre AAA Worldwide (AAA) promotion. It took place on August 9, 2015, at Arena Ciudad de México in Mexico City, Mexico. The event was the twenty-third year in a row that AAA has held a Triplemanía show, and was the thirtieth show held under the Triplemanía name since 1993 as AAA held multiple Triplemanía shows some years. The annual Triplemanía show is AAA's biggest show of the year, serving as the culmination of major storylines and feature wrestlers from all over the world competing in what has been described as AAA's version of WrestleMania or their Super Bowl event.

The main event was billed as a "Dream match" between two of the biggest names in lucha libre, a singles match between Rey Mysterio Jr. and Myzteziz. A second match, a Lucha de Apuestas "hair vs. hair" match between El Patrón Alberto and Brian Cage was confirmed at the AAA television taping on July 10. The show was the final match of lucha libre legend Villano III as he teamed up with his brothers Villano IV and Villano V to take on Los Psycho Circus and three additional matches. The show received very negative reviews both due to technical difficulties throughout the show and the quality of several of the matches on the show.

== Production ==
=== Background ===
2015 marked the 23rd year since 1993 where the Mexican professional wrestling company Lucha Libre AAA Worldwide (AAA) held their annual Triplemanía show and the thirtieth Triplemanía show promoted by AAA as they held multiple Triplemanía shows over the summers of 1994 to 1997. The event took place at the Arena Ciudad de México (Mexico City Arena) an indoor arena in Azcapotzalco, Mexico City, Mexico, that has a maximum capacity of 22,300 spectators. AAA previously held Triplemanía XX, Triplemanía XXI and Triplemanía XXII having held Triplemanía at the arena since its completion in 2012. AAA's Triplemanía is their biggest show of the year, the highlight of their year, AAA's equivalence of the WWE's WrestleMania or their Super Bowl event.

=== Storylines ===
The Triplemanía XXIII show featured six professional wrestling matches with different wrestlers involved in pre-existing scripted feuds, plots and storylines. Wrestlers portrayed either heels (referred to as rudos in Mexico, those that portray the "bad guys") or faces (técnicos in Mexico, the "good guy" characters) as they followed a series of tension-building events, which culminated in a wrestling match or series of matches. On July 1, 2015, AAA Vice President Dorian Roldán announced via Twitter that the 23rd annual Triplemanía show would be held on August 9 in Arena Ciudad de México in Mexico City, Mexico. The show was announced as being available on Internet pay-per-view both in and outside of Mexico. On July 22, it was announced that the event would also be available on cable and satellite PPV in the United States and Canada, making it the first AAA event to air live on American PPV since When Worlds Collide in 1994.

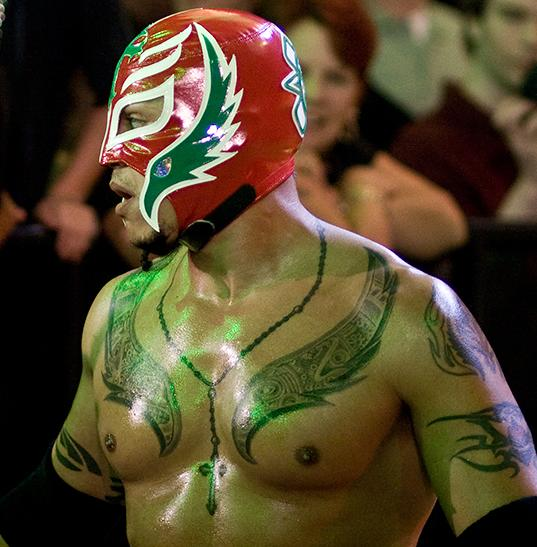
Rey Mysterio Jr. (pictured here in 2011) wrestled in the "Dream Match" main event against Myzteziz

Ever since Myzteziz (then known as Místico) rise in popularity early in the 21st century parallels were drawn between El Principe de Oro y Plata ("The Prince of Gold and Silver") and Rey Mysterio Jr. both in regards to their ring style, skill level and popularity. Myzteziz would become the most popular Luchador in Mexico during the first decade of the 21st century while Rey Mysterio would become the most popular luchador outside of Mexico in the same time period. When Myzteziz joined the WWE under the name Sin Cara in 2011, the idea that the two could face off became a possibility. By mid-2012 wrestling magazine and news websites reported rumors of a Rey Mysterio/Sin Cara possibly taking place at WrestleMania 28 but due to injuries to Rey Mysterio the match did not happen. When Mysterio returned from his injuries in later 2012 he began teaming with Sin Cara on a regular basis, leading once again to speculations that the two might wrestle each other at WrestleMania 29, possibly in a Lucha de Apuestas, or bet match with their masks on the line. The duo teamed regularly throughout the second half of 2012, including a tournament to determine the #1 contenders for the WWE Tag Team Championship, a tournament that Rey Mysterio and Sin Cara lost in the finals to "The Rhodes Scholars" (Cody Rhodes and Damian Sandow) at the 2012 TLC: Tables, Ladders and Chairs pay-per-view. In the wake of their loss rumors of a WrestleMania 29 match arose again, this time with the added rumors that the WWE wanted to use the match to set a record for the most masked fans in one location as well as transitioning the role of the WWE's top Latino wrestler from Rey Mysterio to Sin Cara. Unfortunately Mysterio was forced to take time off once again in March 2013 due to another knee injury. At this point in time it was reported that Rey Mysterio did not intend to sign another contract with the WWE, putting an end to the rumored Rey Mysterio vs Sin Cara match for the time being. In 2014 Sin Cara left the WWE and began working for AAA in Mexico under the name Myzteziz. In February 2015 the WWE announced that Rey Mysterio's contract had expired. A few days later it was announced that he had signed with AAA and would team up with Myzteziz in the main event of the 2015 Rey de Reyes ("King of Kings") show against El Hijo del Perro Aguayo and Pentagón Jr., a match that the reunited team of Mysterio and Myzteziz won when Mysterio Jr. scored the pin. On May 24, 2015, Myzteziz, Rey Mysterio Jr. and El Patrón Alberto formed a "Dream team" to win the Lucha Libre World Cup. On July 10, 2015, AAA announced that the "dream match" between Rey Mysterio Jr. and Myzteziz would finally take place and that it would be the main event of Triplemanía XXIII.

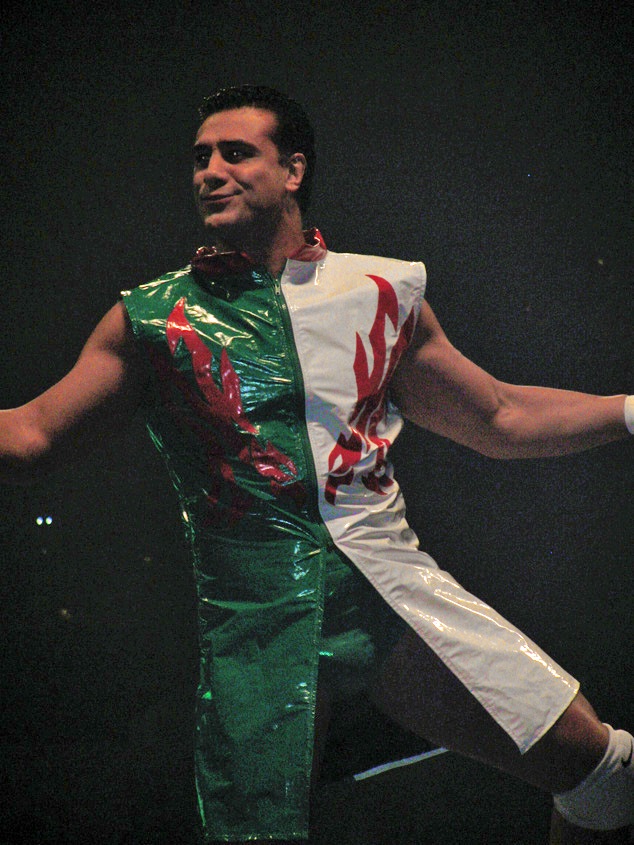
El Patrón Alberto who risked his hair at Triplemanía XXIII against Brian Cage

In early 2015 AAA Mega Champion El Patrón Alberto found himself with an American "invader" challenging him in the form of Brian Cage, who had worked indirectly for AAA through Lucha Underground up until that point. Cage was immediately positioned as a challenger for El Patrón as he, El Hijo de Fantasma and Pentagón Jr. defeated El Patrón Alberto, Fénix and Myzteziz in his AAA debut match on February 27 when Cage pinned Alberto. El Patrón was scheduled to defend the Mega Championship against Cage as part of the 2015 Rey de Reyes show slated for March 15. however, when Guadalajara was hit with a rainstorm, AAA postponed the event for 24 hours and moved it indoors to Auditorio Benito Juarez in Zapopan, Jalisco. The following day AAA announced that they were not able to get all permits in time for the show due to it being a national holiday, and once again postponed the show to Wednesday March 18 instead. At the same time they announced that the announced match between El Patrón Alberto and Brian Cage had been cancelled. El Patrón Alberto later stated that he was legally obligated to compete in Australia later in the week and thus was not able to work the Wednesday show for AAA. On April 1 Cage defeated El Patrón in a Street Fight after members of La Sociedad interfered in the match to help Cage win the match, after which Cage once again challenged El Patrón to the title match he never received. A few weeks later the two faced off again in a one-on-one match, but this time it ended in a no-contest after interference from Dark Cuervo and Dark Scoria, which then brought out Jack Evans and Angélico turning it into a six-man tag team match that El Patrón, Evans and Angélico won when El Patrón pinned Cage. The two rivals found themselves on opposite sides in the Lucha Libre World Cup, with the "Dream team" of El Patrón, Rey Mysterio Jr. and Myzteziz defeated the team of Cage and Ring of Honor representatives Moose and A. C. H. in the second round of the tournament. El Patrón was finally able to defend the Mega Championship against Cage at AAA's 2015 Verano de Escándalo show. The match saw interference from Cage's corner man El Texano Jr. as well as the rudo referee El Hijo del Tirantes favoring Cage throughout the match to stack the odds against El Patrón in the end a second, impartial referee came to the ring and declared a disqualification, leaving the issues between the two unresolved. After the match an enraged El Patrón Alberto laid out a challenge for a Lucha de Apuestas match against Cage, stating that he did not care if he had to put his title on the line, wrestle in a steel cage or whatever it would take to get Cage to put his hair on the line in a match. Next AAA paired up El Patrón and Cage to fight against Blue Demon Jr. and Villano IV in a Pareja Increibles ("Incredible pairs") match, forcing two sets of rivals to team up for a match. As expected El Patrón and Cage were not able to get along, with Cage attacking El Patrón and throwing him through a table at ringside to allow Blue Demon Jr. and Villano IV to win the match. On the AAA television taping on July 10, 2015, Cage accepted the Lucha de Apuestas challenge made repeatedly by El Patrón Alberto. During the English language "Triplemanía XXIII Countdown Special" it was revealed that Alberto had stated that if he lost to Brian Cage he would leave AAA.

On June 26 Goya Kong left Consejo Mundial de Lucha Libre (CMLL) and joined AAA instead, being introduced to the AAA crowd by her brother, Psycho Clown, before the match. After the match Villano IV interrupted the celebrations, claiming that his family, the Mendoza family, also known as La Dinastia Imperial ("The Imperial Dynasty"; Villano and his brothers) was better than the Alvarado family that both Goya Kong and Psycho Clown belonged to. Villano IV's claim was built on the decade long rivalry between various members of Los Villano, including a match where Villano I, IV and Villano V defeated Brazo de Plata (Goya Kong and Psycho Clown's father), Brazo de Oro and El Brazo to unmask the trio back in 1988. Following the match Psycho Clown stated that the Alvarado family was always ready to fight and would be happy to face either Villano IV on his own or any member of the Villano family in the ring. On July 18, 2015, AAA announced that Los Psycho Circus, Psycho Clown, Murder Clown and Monster Clown would face the trio of Villano III, IV and V at Triplemanía. The match was promoted as both another chapter in the Alvarado/Mendoza family feud as well as Villano III's retirement match after 45 years as a wrestler. On July 24, 2015, AAA announced that the event would also be the farewell to referee Pepe "Tropi" Casas who had worked for AAA since its inception in 1992.

AAA announced that to commemorate the 30th anniversary of the debut of Blue Demon Jr. on July 26, 1985, AAA booked Demon Jr. in a tag team match where he would team up with La Parka to face off against El Mesias and Electroshock as part of the 23rd Triplemanía event. While there was no ongoing storyline at the time of the match being announced the four wrestlers were no strangers to each other, with them all facing off at Triplemanía XXII in a six-man steel cage match where the last man in the cage would be shaved bald. The mach also included Averno and Chessman and ended with El Mesias being the last to escape the cage, forcing Electroshock to have his hair shaved off. The AAA preview for the match did point out that a year ago El Mesias and Electroshock were both tecnicos and on the same side until the end of the cage match.

On June 14, 2015 Los Hell Brothers (Averno, Chessman and Cibernético) defeated Los Psycho Circus and Holocausto (Electroshock, El Hijo de Pirata Morgan and La Parka Negra) to win the AAA World Trios Championship as part of the 2015 Verano de Escándalo ("Summer of Scandal") show. On July 28, 2015, AAA Announced that Los Hell Brothers would face off against Los Güeros del Cielo ("The Sky Blondes"; Angélico and Jack Evans) teaming with Fénix as well as the trio of El Hijo del Fantasma, El Texano Jr. and Pentagón Jr. as they defend the AAA World Trios Championship at Triplemanía. Prior to the show Fénix and Los Güeros del Cielo had not teamed up on a regular basis while Hijo del Fantasma, Texano Jr. and Pentagón Jr. had all been members of the group Los Perros del Mal and teamed together on occasion. With the death of El Hijo del Perro Aguayo earlier in 2015 the future of Los Perros del Mal under that name was in question and while not officially announced as Los Perros del Mal they kept wearing the Perros del Mal shirts. At the time of the announcement El Hijo del Fantasma held the AAA World Cruiserweight Championship while Pentagón Jr. was one half of both the AAA World Tag Team Championship team (with Joe Líder) and the AAA World Mixed Tag Team Championship (with Sexy Star).

AAA has traditionally included a Relevos Atómicos de Locura, or "Atomic Madness" match as part of their major shows for years as a homage to AAA founder Antonio Peña who created the concept years prior. In a Relevos Atómicos de Locura match each team represents the four distinct type of wrestlers that work for AAA, Male, Female, Mini-Estrella and Exótico. While the match is a mixed-gender match there are no rules to limit the interaction between the teams so males wrestle females, Mini-Estrellas wrestle Exótico and so on. For the 2015 show AAA paired up Drago (male), Goya Kong (female), Dinastía (Mini-Estrella and AAA World Mini-Estrella Champion) and Pimpinela Escarlata (Exótico) on the 'tecnico side to take on Daga (male), Sexy Star (female), Mini Psycho Clown (Mini-Estrella) and Mamba (Exótico). The two Exótico had fought on opposite sides of various Relevos Atómicos de Locura matches for years, as far back as the 2014 Rey de Reyes ("King of Kings"). Goya Kong had only recently joined AAA making the Triplemanía XXIII her first major AAA appearance. Dinastía and Mini Psycho Clown had been working a long-running storyline prior to the show, including Dinastía successfully defending the AAA World Mini-Estrellas Championship against Mini Psycho Clown on June 28, 2015.

== 2015 AAA Hall of Fame ==
In the weeks leading up to Triplemanía XXIII AAA announced their intentions to induct El Hijo del Perro Aguayo (The Son of Perro Aguayo), sometimes referred to as "Perro Aguayo Jr." into their Hall of Fame at Triplemanía. Aguayo made his professional wrestling debut on June 18, 1995, at Triplemanía III-B. Having worked for AAA's biggest rival Consejo Mundial de Lucha Libre (CMLL) for years El Hijo del Perro Aguayo returned to AAA 2010 at Triplemanía XVIII leading his Los Perros del Mal group in an invasion storyline. Over the following years Aguayo Jr. was one of AAA's top rudo workers. During a match on March 20, 2015, Aguayo hit the ring ropes wrong after a drop kick from Rey Mysterio Jr. and later died from the injuries suffered during the match.

On August 6, AAA announced Héctor Garza as the second Hall of Fame inductee in the class of 2015.

== Event ==
Other on-screen personnel
Role	Name
Spanish language commentators	Arturo Rivera
Spanish language commentators	Andrés Maroñas
Spanish language commentators	Leonardo Riaño
Spanish language commentators	Jesús Zuñiga
English language commentators	Matt Striker
English language commentators	Hugo Savinovich
Referees	Pepe Casas
Referees	El Hijo de Tirantes
Referees	Copetes Salazar
Referees	Piero
Referees	Rafa El Maya
Ring Announcer	Armando Gaitán

The English language broadcast of Triplemanía XXIII experienced extended periods of time with audio problems, at times neither of the commentators were heard, at other times only Matt Striker could be heard and at one point there was a prolonged buzzing sound on the English language broadcast. It has not been confirmed if the Spanish language broadcast suffered from the same audio issues. The broadcast also suffered from some video issues especially early in the fourth match of the night involving Blue Demon Jr., La Parka, Electroshock and Mesisas. The Triplemanía XXIII stage set resembled the nose of a large cargo plane with wrestlers walking down steps through an opening in the front of the plan, then proceeding down what was described as the Mission: Impossible – Rogue Nation runway, a ramp that resembled an airport runway.

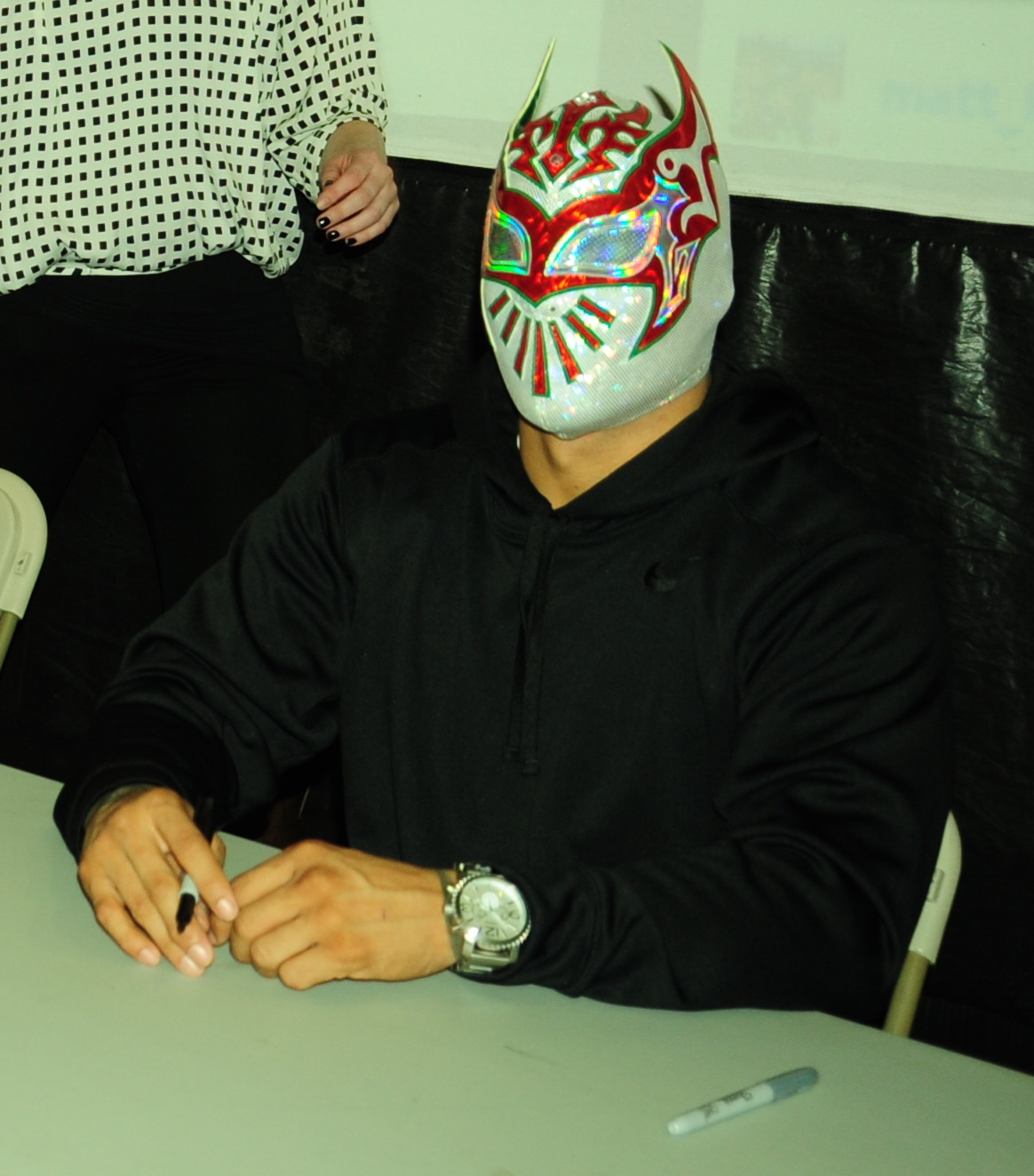
Myzteziz, the other half of the "Dream Match" main event, who turned heel (rudo) after the match

For his entrance prior to the main event Myzteziz was lowered from the ceiling wearing a harness, holding a pose similar to that of Ethan Hunt (portrayed by Tom Cruise) from the first Mission: Impossible movie. Once he landed on the ground and was unhooked he revealed a half black/half white version of his normal wrestling gear, alluding to comments made prior to the show that he may or may not work as a tecnico for the match. Initially Rey Mysterio Jr. took control of the match, much to Myzteziz's frustration, with Myzteziz only gaining control of the match by using punches, kicks and other rudo tactics. This drew boos from the crowd as they were vocally behind Rey Mysterio Jr. At one point during the match Myzteziz slammed Rey Mysterio Jr. onto of the English Language commentator's table, and at another point he suplexed Mysterio Jr. out of the ring, through a table. At one point Rey Mysterio Jr. threw Myzteziz into one of the ring posts, making it look like Myzteziz hit his head on the metal. While the cameras were focusing on Rey Mysterio Jr. Myzteziz made it look like the impact had cut his forehead open as blood (or a similar red substance) covered the white portion of his mask. Once the two wrestlers returned to the ring Rey Mysterio Jr. started to tear at Myzteziz's mask, tearing it open around the eye holds. Late in the match Rey Mysterio Jr. managed to apply Myzteziz's finishing hold, the La Mistica Fujiwara armbar, on Myzteziz but did not gain a submission from the move. Later on Mysterio Jr. managed to apply La Mistica once more, this time with Myzteziz being forced to tap out. As Mysterio Jr. celebrated on the floor Averno, Pentagón Jr. and Joe Líder ran to the ring to attack Myzteziz while he was down. When Rey Mysterio Jr. noticed the attack he entered the ring and helped Myzteziz fight off the rudo trios. When Mysterio Jr. offered a handshake Myzteziz spit a liquid in Mysterio's eyes and then declared that he did not care about the fans or Rey Mysterio Jr. He later challenged Mysterio to put his mask on the line in a Luchas de Apuestas match. As the show went off the air Myzteziz declined to join Konnan's La Sociedad, stating he was on his own.

== Reception ==
In the minutes after the PPV ended Lucha Libre journalist Apolo Valdés, who writes for the sports website MedioTiempo commented on Twitter that he really did not like the show, he only liked the cage match.

Josh Boutwell, reviewing the show for WrestleView stated the second match of the night involving Los Villanos was a "trainwreck". He also noted that the Apuestas match was "awesome" and that the main event was a great match despite a couple of clunky spots." He also noted that the PPV broadcast suffered from several technical issues, primarily with the sound on the English commentary and occasionally also issues with the picture quality. In the end he gave the Mysterio/Myzteziz match four stars out of five and rated the entire show as a "C+".

James Caldewell of the Pro Wrestling Torch noted that the cage match "felt disorganized with so many people involved and a lot of standing around". Following the conclusion of the main event he commented that "more aimed at the live audience than translating to PPV". His final conclusion was "Not a recommended PPV. The last two matches had star-power and stories to carry the event once the technical difficulties were worked out, but the live atmosphere and significance of the event just did not seem to translate to PPV".

Richard Gallegos, when writing an editorial for SuperLuchas Magazine, called Triplemanía XXIII "a disaster", both due to technical issues but also due to the fact that they were presenting a show to the US audience which have very little back story or build to four of the six matches, citing the Los Villanos/Los Psycho Circus match as one of the worst matches of the year. Summarizing he called it a "terrible experience" and that the production crew was a "monumental failure.

Dave Meltzer of the Wrestling Observer Newsletter called the event "one of the worst PPV shows of all-time", stating "[t]his was a misfire to the level it's probably best for them to regroup and not try this again for some time". He gave the Los Villanos/Los Psycho Circus match a "minus five star" rating, calling it "one of the worst matches [he had] ever seen". He gave the main event three and three quarter stars out of five, his highest rating of the night. Meltzer, who had been approached by AAA to work as part of the English announcing team for the event, also stated that while he had sympathy for the announcers for the technical issues, he would not want them back, calling Matt Striker "terrible throughout" and stating that Hugo Savinovich was "off his game" in regard to clueing fans in on the storylines behind the matches.

Readers of the Wrestling Observer Newsletter voted the match between Los Psycho Circus and Los Villanos the 2015 Worst Match of the Year and the entire event as the Worst Major Wrestling Show.

== Results ==
No.	Results	Stipulations
1	Dinastía, Drago, Goya Kong and Pimpinela Escarlata defeated Daga, Mamba, Mini Psycho Clown, and Sexy Star	Relevos Atómicos de Locura match
2	Los Villanos (Villano III, Villano IV and Villano V) defeated Los Psycho Circus (Monster Clown, Murder Clown and Psycho Clown)	Six-man tag team match
3	Los Hell Brothers (Averno, Chessman and Cibernético) (c) defeated Fénix and Los Güeros del Cielo (Angélico and Jack Evans) and El Hijo del Fantasma, Pentagón Jr., El Texano Jr.	Three-way trios steel cage match for the AAA World Trios Championship
4	Blue Demon Jr. and La Parka defeated Electroshock and El Mesias	Tag team match
5	El Patrón Alberto (with Fénix) defeated Brian Cage (with El Hijo del Fantasma)	Lucha de Apuestas hair vs. hair match
6	Rey Mysterio Jr. defeated Myzteziz by submission	Singles match
(c) / – the champion(s) heading into the match
