= Héroes Inmortales (2011) =

2011 Lucha Libre AAA World Wide event

- Promotional poster featuring Dr. Wagner Jr., El Hijo del Perro Aguayo, Los Psycho Circus and Los Perros del Mal
- Promotion: AAA
- Date: October 9, 2011
- City: Monterrey, Nuevo León
- Venue: Arena Monterrey
- Attendance: 8,000
- Tagline(s): Homenaje luctuoso a Don Antonio Peña (Memorial tribute to Mr. Antonio Peña)

Pay-per-view chronology
← Previous; Verano de Escándalo	Next → Guerra de Titanes

Héroes Inmortales Shows chronology
← Previous; 2010	Next → 2012

Héroes Inmortales (2011) (Spanish for "Immortal Heroes") was a professional wrestling pay-per-view (PPV) event produced by the AAA promotion, which took place on October 9, 2011, at Arena Monterrey in Monterrey, Nuevo León, Mexico, commemorating the fifth anniversary of the death of AAA founder Antonio Peña. While the two previous Peña memorial shows were labeled with the Roman numerals III and IV, the 2011 event was simply known as Héroes Inmortales. The main attraction of the event was the Mexican debut of Sting, who took part in the ongoing storyline invasion of wrestlers from American promotion Total Nonstop Action Wrestling (TNA). TNA performers Abyss, Jeff Jarrett, Magnus and Velvet Sky also took part in the event. Other matches taking place at the event included the fifth annual Copa Antonio Peña, Dr. Wagner Jr. defending the AAA Latin American Championship against El Hijo del Perro Aguayo and the culmination of the yearlong rivalry between Los Perros del Mal and Los Psycho Circus in a Lucha de Apuestas Masks vs. Hairs match, at the end of which one team would be either forced to unmask or have their heads shaved.

== Production ==
=== Background ===
On October 5, 2006, founder of the Mexican professional wrestling, company AAA Antonio Peña died from a heart attack. The following year, on October 7, 2007, Peña's brother-in-law Jorge Roldan who had succeeded Peña as head of AAA held a show in honor of Peña's memory, the first ever Antonio Peña Memorial Show (Homenaje a Antonio Peña in Spanish). AAA made the tribute to Peña into a major annual event that would normally take place in October of each year, renaming the show series Héroes Inmortales (Spanish for "Immortal Heroes"), retroactively rebranding the 2007 and 2008 event as Héroes Inmortales I and Héroes Inmortales II. As part of their annual tradition AAA holds a Copa Antonio Peña ("Antonio Peña Cup") tournament with various wrestlers from AAA or other promotions competing for the trophy. The tournament is normally either a gauntlet match or a multi-man torneo cibernetico elimination match. Outside of the actual Copa Antonio Peña trophy the winner is not guaranteed any other "prizes" as a result of winning, although several Copa Antonio Peña winners did go on to challenge for the AAA Mega Championship. The 2011 show was the fifth show in the Héroes Inmortales series of shows.

=== Storylines ===
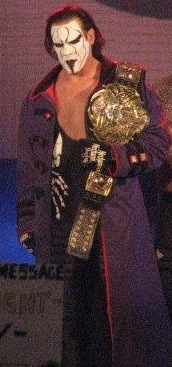
Sting, who made his first wrestling appearance in Mexico during the event

The Héroes Inmortales show featured seven professional wrestling matches with different wrestlers involved in pre-existing, scripted feuds, plots, and storylines. Wrestlers were portrayed as either heels (referred to as rudos in Mexico, those that portray the "bad guys") or faces (técnicos in Mexico, the "good guy" characters) as they followed a series of tension-building events, which culminated in a wrestling match or series of matches.

At AAA's previous major event, Verano de Escándalo on July 31, Jeff Jarrett, a member of AAA's top rudo alliance La Sociedad and the founder of American promotion Total Nonstop Action Wrestling (TNA), successfully defended the AAA Mega Championship against Dr. Wagner Jr. and fellow La Sociedad member L.A. Park. On the September 10 edition of AAA's Sin Límite television program La Sociedad leader Konnan informed Jarrett that Wagner Jr. and Park were no longer going to be a problem for him, but that El Mesías, who had a history with TNA, having worked for the promotion from 2007 to 2008, was after his title. Konnan, remembering that El Mesías had already lost the AAA Mega Championship and his hair to members of La Sociedad, asked Jarrett for a big name to stop him, which led to Jarrett announcing that at Héroes Inmortales Sting would be making his debut in Mexico and facing El Mesías in a singles match. In the buildup to the match, AAA noted Sting's and El Mesías' history against each other back from 2007, when the latter worked for TNA under the ring name Judas Mesias. The two engaged in two brawls with each other on the September 20 and 27, 2007, editions of TNA's primary television program, Impact!. The brawls were used to write the injured Mesias off television for the next three months and upon his return to TNA, his rivalry with Sting was not mentioned again. Sting appeared on the September 23 edition of Sin Límite, talking about his upcoming match and praising both his opponent and the country of Mexico, making a clear distinction between himself and La Sociedad.

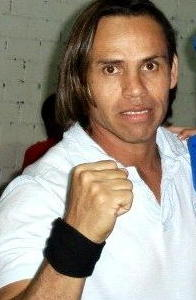
Konan Big

In April 2011, El Hijo del Perro Aguayo, the leader of Los Perros del Mal, one of the subgroups within La Sociedad, was sidelined from in-ring action as he was forced to undergo an emergency surgery to remove a golf ball-sized tumor from his stomach. Aguayo made a quick recovery and returned to AAA on May 1 to continue Los Perros del Mal's feud with Los Psycho Circus (Monster Clown, Murder Clown and Psycho Clown) and Dr. Wagner Jr., the quartet known collectively as Potencia Mundial. However, a month later, just days prior to Triplemanía XIX, Aguayo was forced to pull out of the event due to his body's adverse reaction to the medication given to him as part of his tumor treatment. Finally, two months later on August 19, Aguayo made his surprise return to AAA, replacing stablemate L.A. Park and teaming with Damián 666 and Halloween against El Mesías, Joe Líder and El Zorro in a six man tag team match, which they lost via disqualification, when Líder was attacked by his former tag team partner Nicho el Millonario, whom Aguayo then named the newest member of Los Perros del Mal. At the following taping on September 1, Aguayo faced AAA Latin American Champion Dr. Wagner Jr. in a non-title match, which ended in another disqualification, following interference from Nicho. Later in the taping, Wagner Jr. saved Los Psycho Circus and Joe Líder from Los Perros del Mal and then proceeded to challenge the rudo group to a Masks vs. Hairs match. On September 11, Wagner Jr., El Mesías and Extreme Tiger defeated Aguayo, Damián 666 and Halloween in a six man tag team match. After the match, La Sociedad overpowered their opponents, giving Aguayo the opportunity to reveal that at Héroes Inmortales he would be challenging Wagner Jr. for the AAA Latin American Championship with Monterrey-based independent professional wrestler, television host and rapper Konan Big in his corner. On September 16, Aguayo, Damián, Halloween and Nicho defeated Potencia Mundial in an eight man tag team match, when Damián pinned Psycho Clown. After the rudos were chased out of the ring by the steel chair-wielding Octagón, Psycho challenged them to a Masks vs. Hairs match at Héroes Inmortales, which Damián accepted. Wagner Jr. then accepted Octagón's offer to accompany both him and Los Psycho Circus to the ring at the event. This marked the fifth major AAA event in a row, where the two groups battle each other and continued the storyline from Verano de Escándalo, where Los Perros del Mal member X-Fly lost his hair in a similar match contested inside a steel cage. However, unlike in the several previous Luchas de Apuestas between the two teams, this time the entire losing team would lose their masks or hairs in the match, which was to contested inside the Domo de la Muerte, a domed steel cage. At the final television tapings, taking place six days prior to the pay-per-view, Damián 666, Halloween and X-Fly successfully defended the AAA World Trios Championship against Los Psycho Circus, while Aguayo pinned Wagner Jr. in a six-man tag team match. Post-match, Damián promised a surprise at Héroes Inmortales, which would "revolutionize lucha libre".

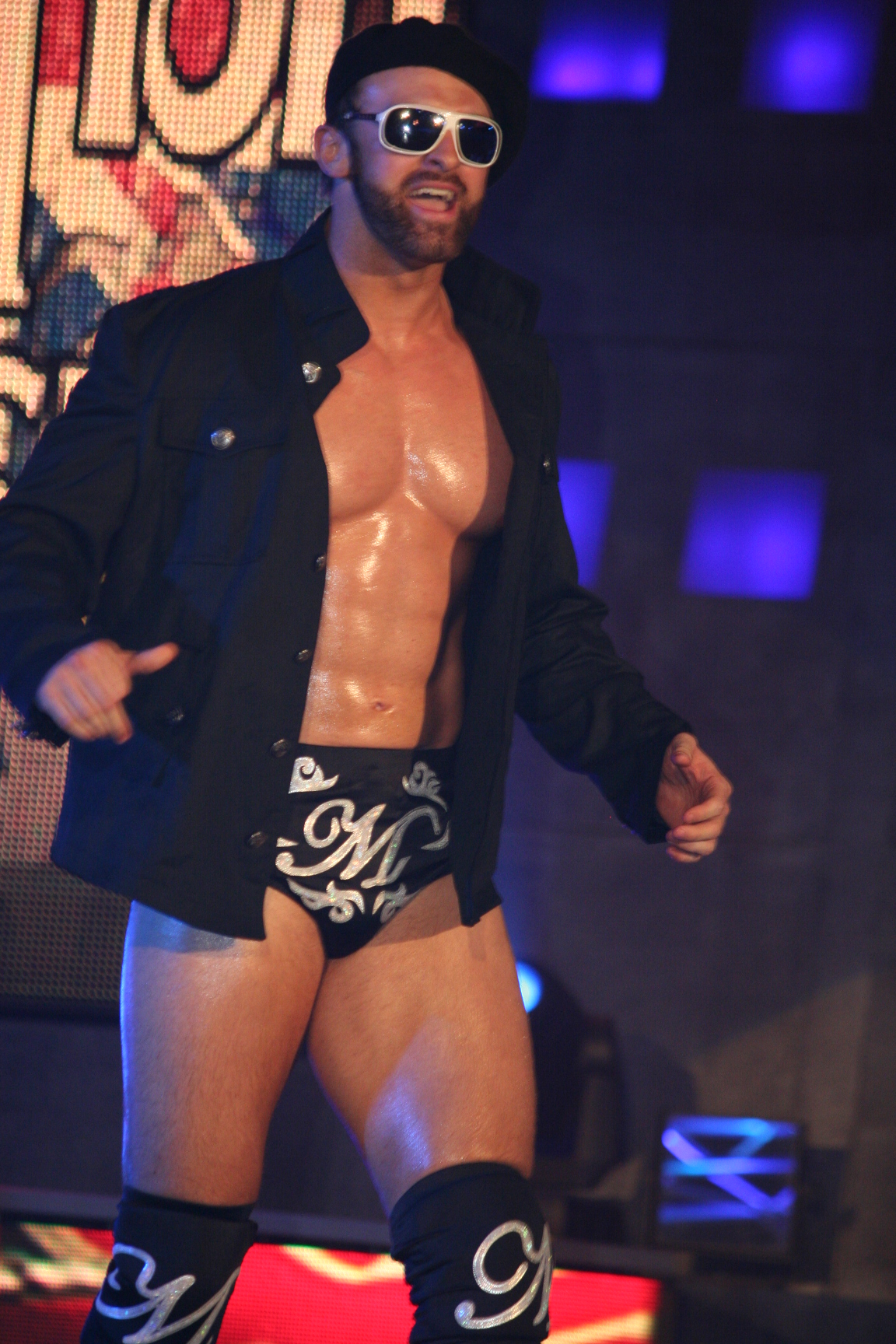
Magnus, who made his AAA debut in the weeks leading to the event

TNA's storyline invasion of AAA, which started in May 2011, continued after Verano de Escándalo with appearances by Abyss, Magnus and Rosita on AAA's television programs. At the September 11 taping, Konnan announced that at Héroes Inmortales Abyss would team with Chessman to challenge Extreme Tiger and Jack Evans for the AAA World Tag Team Championship, while TNA Knockout Velvet Sky would be making her first appearance for AAA since Triplemanía XIX in a match, where she would face Lolita. However, Sky's match was later changed to a six-woman tag team match, where she would team with La Sociedad and La Legión Extranjera members Jennifer Blake and Sexy Star against Cynthia Moreno and Faby and Mari Apache. For the match, the competitors would be wearing fluorescent clothes and wrestling under a black light, making them glow in the dark. The match type, known in Spanish as Lucha a Oscuras, is one of several match types created by Antonio Peña, and was previously used at Héroes Inmortales III in 2009.

On September 25, AAA announced the ten participants in the fifth annual Copa Antonio Peña. The match was built around the storyline power struggle between AAA's chief executive officer Joaquín Roldán and his son, AAA vice president and La Sociedad leader Dorian Roldán, with both choosing their own sets of participants for the match. The match included the reigning AAA Mega Champion Jeff Jarrett and fellow TNA worker Magnus. Active rivalries within the match included the ones between Cibernético, the leader of Los Bizarros, and La Parka, the leader of rival group El Inframundo, the team of Electroshock and Heavy Metal and the leader of Los Maniacos, Silver King, and L.A. Park and El Zorro. The feud between L.A. Park and El Zorro stems back to late 2010, when both were members of La Sociedad and Konnan, remaining loyal to his longest-standing partnership, chose El Zorro as the next challenger for the AAA Mega Championship, which he went on to win in December. The fact that the AAA Mega Championship was now in La Sociedad did not stop Park from announcing his desire to challenge for the title. In May 2011, Park and Konnan turned on El Zorro and kicked him out of La Sociedad, after being fooled by Los Bizarros into believing that he had attacked Park twice during the past month, when in fact the attacks had been perpetrated by Charly Manson with the goal of causing dissension within the rudo group. Park finally received his long-awaited shot at the AAA Mega Championship at Verano de Escándalo, but was instructed to only make sure that the title stayed on his La Sociedad stablemate Jeff Jarrett in a three-way match with Dr. Wagner Jr. After Wagner Jr. was eliminated from the match, the alliance between Park and Jarrett broke down following interference from Jarrett's wife, Karen. In the end, when Park went to perform a powerbomb on Karen, someone dressed as El Zorro ran to the ring and hit him with Jarrett's signature guitar, which led to Jarrett scoring the pinfall to retain his title. On the September 10 edition of Sin Límite, it was revealed in a secret conversation between Jarrett and Konnan, that the person who had interfered in the match was in fact La Sociedad member Chessman, not El Zorro. Konnan's plan was to send Park on a "wild-goose chase" after El Zorro instead of continuing to chase Jarrett's title. Chessman was rewarded for his deed on September 16, when Konnan named him La Legión Extranjera's new general, taking over the spot previously held by El Zorro.

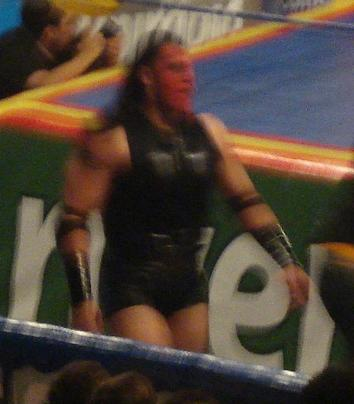
Chessman, the new general of La Legión Extranjera

The undercard of Héroes Inmortales included a lumberjack match, which incorporated three less featured rivalries into a single match. The rivalry between Alan Stone and El Elegido stems back to August 6, 2010, when Alan followed the example of his brother, Chris, and turned on El Elegido, joining La Sociedad's subgroup La Milicia. In 2011, the rivalry came to include battles for Stone's and Jennifer Blake's AAA World Mixed Tag Team Championship. After becoming the first man to have won the AAA Reina de Reinas Championship at the previous Verano de Escándalo event, Pimpinela Escarlata became the target of Nygma, Pasión Cristal, Polvo de Estrellas and Yuriko, four other wrestlers with transvestite gimmicks, known in Mexico as exoticos, who bonded together through their jealousy of Escarlata's success. The four attacked Escarlata at the August 19 tapings, leading to the match at Héroes Inmortales, where the new group would be represented by Polvo de Estrellas. Midget wrestlers, known in Mexico as Mini-Estrellas, Mini Histeria and Octagóncito have been feuding on and off ever since Histeria joined AAA in 1998, originally working without a mask under the ring name Rocky Marvin, but the rivalry heated up again on April 27, 2011, when Mini Histeria helped his Los Mini Vipers stablemate Mini Psicosis defeat Octagóncito for the AAA World Mini-Estrella Championship.

== Event ==
Other on-screen personnel
Role:	Name:
Commentators	Andres Maroñas
Commentators	Jesús Zúñiga
Commentators	Arturo Rivera
Referees	Pepe Casas
Referees	Piero
Referees	Copetes Salazar
Referees	Hijo del Tirantes

=== Preliminary matches ===
The opening match of Héroes Inmortales saw Jennifer Blake, Sexy Star and Velvet Sky of La Legión Extranera take on Cynthia Moreno and the Apache sisters, Faby and Mari, in a Glow in the Dark match. The match ended with Sexy pinning Mari for the win, after hitting her with a steel chair and La Sociedad referee Hijo del Tirantes performing a fast count. Afterwards, the rudas celebrated by dancing in the ring.

Next up was a lumberjack match between the team of Alan Stone, Mini Histeria and Polvo Estrellas, and El Elegido, Octagóncito and Pimpinela Escarlata with El Apache, El Brazo, Cynthia Moreno, Faby Apache, Jennifer Blake, Mari Apache, Nygma, Pasión Cristal and Sexy Star serving as the lumberjacks. After Escarlata submitted Stone with a modified figure-four leglock for the win, he was once again attacked by Nygma, Pasión Cristal and Polvo de Estrellas. This led to exotico Cassandro making a surprise return to AAA, after over a three-year absence, to chase the rudos away and save his former partner.

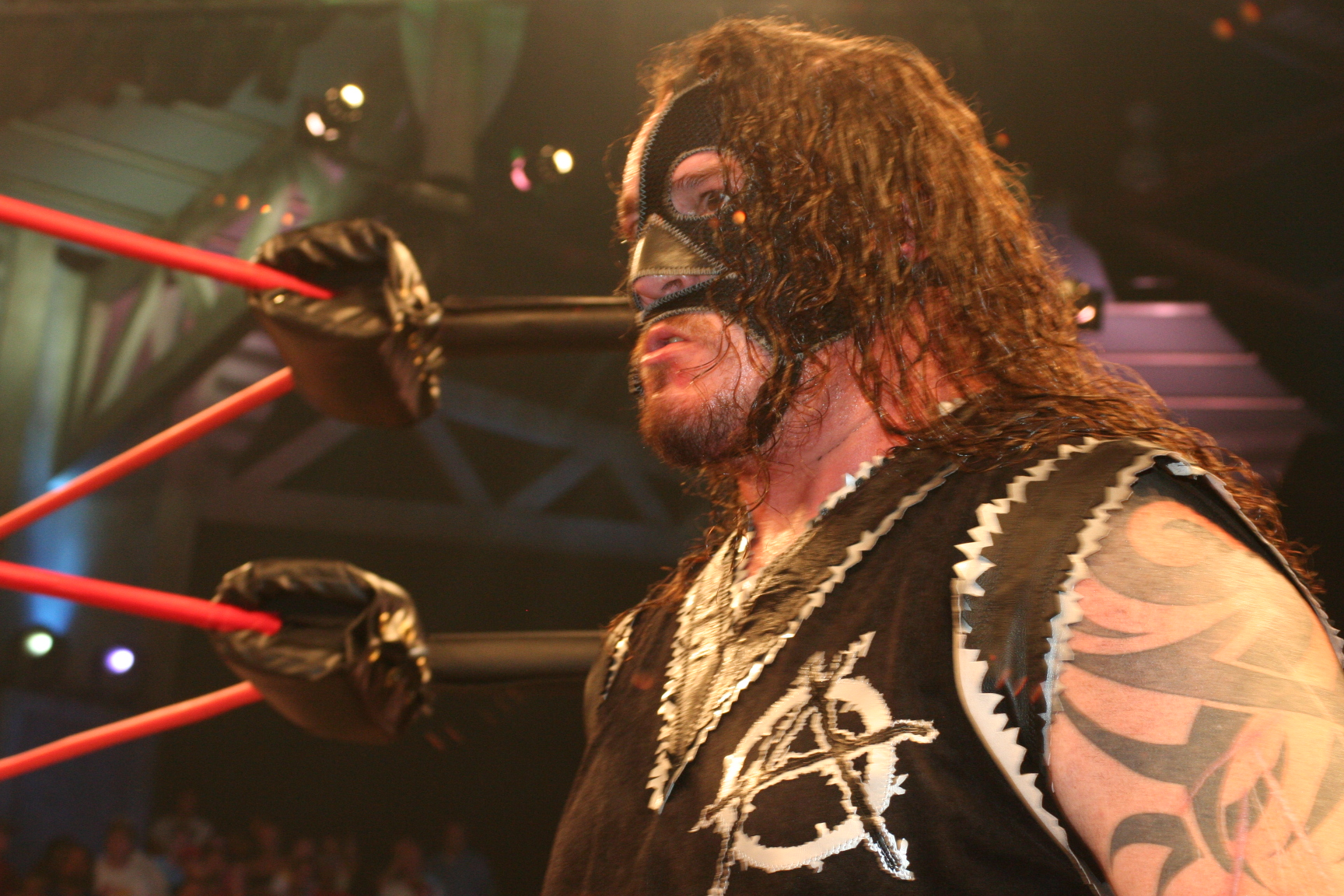
Abyss, who was crowned one half of the new AAA World Tag Team Champions at the event

In the third match, Extreme Tiger and Jack Evans defended the AAA World Tag Team Championship against La Legión Extranjera's and La Sociedad's Abyss and Chessman in a Tables, Ladders, and Chairs match, which could only be won by capturing the championship belts hung above the ring. After Tiger had jumped off a ladder with a diving guillotine leg drop onto Chessman who was lying on the guardrail, the Tag Team Champions set up two tables in the ring, only to be taken out by Abyss, before they could use them. Abyss then emptied a bag of thumbtacks onto one of the tables and powerbombed Tiger through it. Evans tried to climb the ladder to his and Tiger's belts, but was stopped by Chessman, who then chokeslammed him off the ladder through the other table. Chessman then climbed up the ladder and retrieved the belts, making himself and Abyss the new AAA World Tag Team Champions.

After a performance by the dance troupe Reinas del Ring, AAA presented a video clip, where its wrestlers remembered AAA founder Antonio Peña.

The fourth match was the fifth annual Copa Antonio Peña gauntlet match. Out of the original ten entrants, Heavy Metal, did not take part in the match for an unspecified reason. The first two entrants into the match were La Parka and L.A. Park with a new wrestler entering the match every 60 seconds. The start of the match was dominated by La Parka, but this changed when the third entrant, Silver King, made his way to the ring to help his La Sociedad stablemate. Fourth entrant was Electroshock, who immediately went after his rival Silver King. Entrants five and six were Cibernético and El Zorro, which led to the first elimination of the match as Silver King and Park eliminated blood rivals Cibernético and La Parka as they were battling each other on the ropes. The two continued their brawl backstage. The seventh entrant was AAA Mega Champion Jeff Jarrett, who was accompanied by his wife Karen. As Jarrett and Park teamed up against El Zorro, Electroshock managed to toss Silver King out of the ring for the third elimination. Joe Líder entered the ring as number eight, attacking both Park and Jarrett. The final entrant in the match was TNA wrestler Magnus, who chose to go after Líder. Park made his second elimination of the match by dropkicking El Zorro out of the ring, after which he and Jarrett teamed up against Líder. Park also attacked Magnus, before being told not to by Jarrett. This led to Electroshock eliminating Magnus as Park used a monkey flip to eliminate Líder, who was then stretchered backstage, leaving Park, Electroshock and Jarrett in the ring. The two La Sociedad members dominated Electroshock, whose comeback attempt was stopped by Jarrett hitting a low blow, followed by Park hitting an assisted powerbomb. As the rudos celebrated, Park surprised Jarrett by throwing him out of the ring for the seventh elimination. As Park celebrated the elimination by dancing and making fun of the Jarretts, all the while dominating Electroshock, hitting him with a double knee backbreaker, Karen grabbed his leg from outside the ring. Park then lifted Karen by her hair onto the ring apron, but before he could do anything else to her, he was attacked by Electroshock. As referees Pepe Casas and Piero were distracted, trying to get Karen off the ring apron, someone dressed and masked as El Zorro entered the ring and hit Park twice with a kendo stick. Electroshock used his opportunity to eliminate Park and win the Copa Antonio Peña. Afterwards, Joaquín Roldán entered the ring to present Electroshock with a trophy.

=== Main event matches ===
In the first semi-main event of the evening, AAA's El Mesías took on TNA's Sting in what AAA referred to as a "dream match". After a short back-and-forth match, El Mesías hit Sting with a double knee backbreaker, which, however, was only good for a near-fall. As El Mesías climbed the turnbuckles, looking for a Mesías Splash, he was distracted by Konnan, Jeff Jarrett, Karen Jarrett, Abyss and Magnus coming to ringside. Sting used the distraction to superplex his opponent down to the mat, before locking him in his signature hold, the Scorpion Deathlock. El Mesías was, however, able to make it to the ropes to force a break, but took a punch to the face from Jarrett in the process. Magnus then entered the ring and gave Sting a steel chair, but instead of using it on El Mesías, he hit his fellow TNA worker with it instead. El Mesías used to distraction to hit a spear on Sting, but Abyss broke up the following pinfall by pulling the Puerto Rican out of the ring. As Jarrett entered the ring to confront Sting, referee Hijo del Tirantes called the match off. After a short argument, Sting attacked Jarrett, but was quickly overpowered by Konnan and Abyss. Sting managed to gain control of the brawl, after El Mesías handed him his signature baseball bat. El Mesías then entered the ring to clothesline Jarrett and Konnan, before coming together with Sting to double clothesline Abyss out of the ring. The segment with El Mesías and Sting sharing a handshake and a hug.

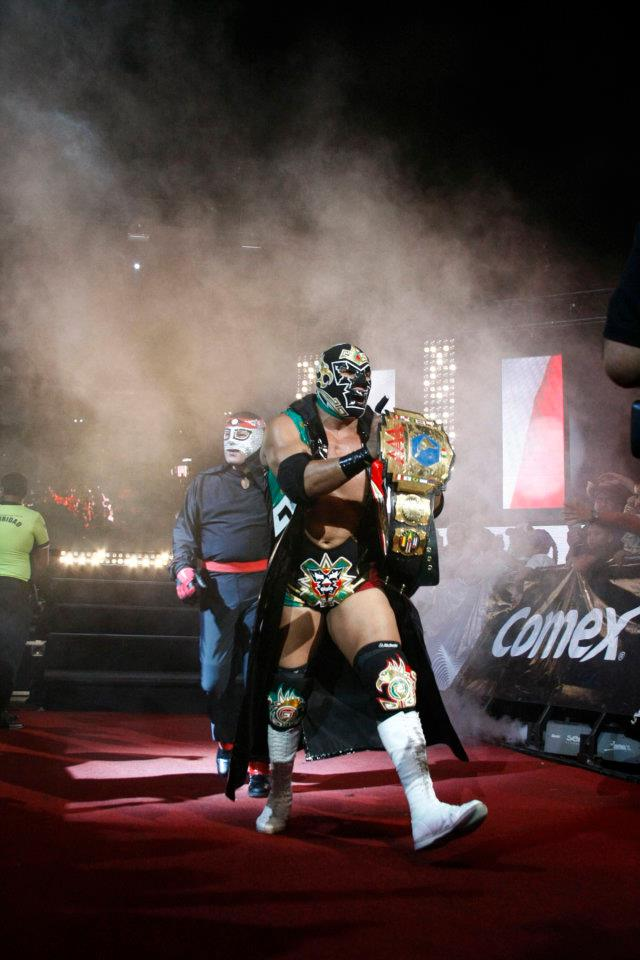
Octagón walking Dr. Wagner Jr. to the ring for the semi-main event

The following match saw Dr. Wagner Jr. defending the AAA Latin American Championship against El Hijo del Perro Aguayo in a Bullterrier match. For the match, the two competitors were tied to each other with a chain with the only way to win was to touch all six turnbuckles in succession. As previously announced, Wagner Jr. was accompanied to the match by Octagón, while Aguayo was accompanied by not only local celebrity Konan Big, but also Silver King, Wagner Jr.'s real life brother. The match started with a brawl in the crowd and while Konan Big and Silver King regularly interfered in the match, Octagón never laid his finger on any of the rudos. Eventually the competitors, both bleeding from their foreheads, entered the ring, where Wagner Jr. took control of the match by beating Aguayo with a steel chair and hitting both Konan Big and Silver King with the chain. Wagner Jr. then touched five of the six corners, hit an interfering Silver King once again with the chain and then touched the sixth corner to win the match and retain his title. As Wagner Jr. celebrated his victory, Octagón entered the ring, hit him over the head with a steel chair and then started stomping him along with Aguayo, Konan Big and Silver King, turning rudo for the first time in his career. As Aguayo removed Wagner Jr.'s mask, Octagón's longtime partner La Parka came running out to the ring and grabbed the steel chair, but instead of saving the Latin American Champion, he surprisingly also used the chair on him, joining the beatdown. Octagón and La Parka, arguably two of AAA's top técnicos prior to the event, were met with a chorus of boos as Aguayo celebrated holding his rival's mask. The segment ended with Konnan coming to the ring to pose with the five rudos, before confirming to the announcers that Octagón and La Parka had joined La Sociedad.

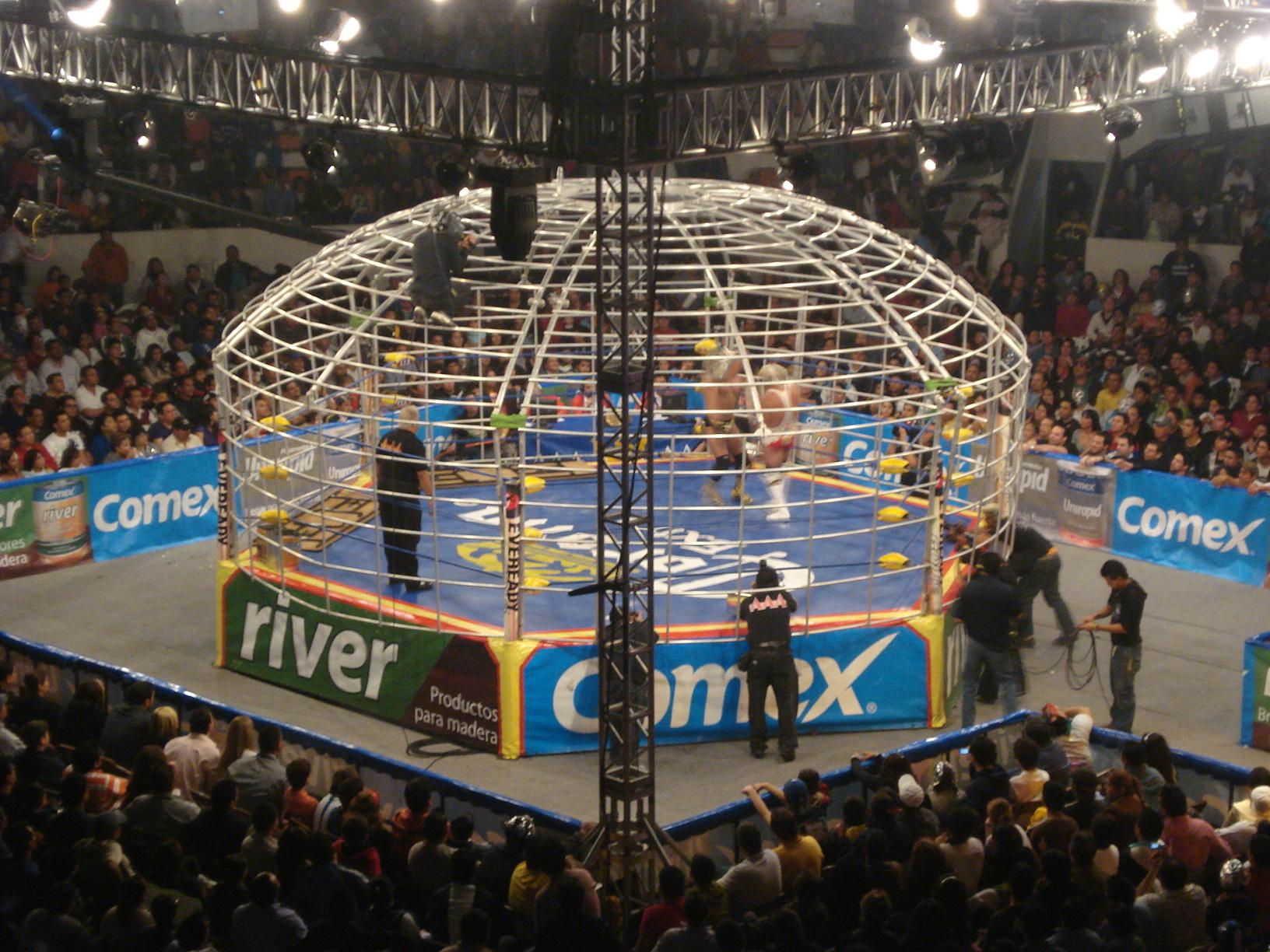
Domo de la Muerte, the structure advertised to settle the score between Los Perros del Mal and Los Psycho Circus

The main event of the evening was the culmination of the yearlong rivalry between Los Perros del Mal and Los Psycho Circus. While the match was advertised as taking place inside the Domo de la Muerte, it instead took place inside a regular steel cage, contested under escape rules. The match started with Los Psycho Circus' midget companion, Mini Clown, entering the ring and taking a Martinete from Halloween. Los Perros del Mal dominated the early part of the match, ripping their opponents' masks open and bloodying them. After Mini Clown left the cage, Damián 666 climbed to the top of the cage teasing a dive, before deciding to escape instead, much to the disappointment of his partners. Murder Clown used the distraction to his advantage and climbed out of the cage and was followed by Halloween. Shortly afterwards, Monster Clown climbed up and dove outside onto Damián, Halloween and Murder Clown, leaving only Nicho el Millonario and Psycho Clown inside. As both men climbed up the cage to escape, Los Perros del Mal member Bestia 666 ran ringside, climbed up and dropped Psycho down to the mat; he, however, managed to pull Nicho down with him. Bestia then entered the cage and double-teamed Psycho Clown with Nicho, before he ordered him to get out of the cage. After Bestia had left, Nicho attacked Psycho with a steel chair, which led to his rival Joe Líder running out, entering the cage and attacking him. Bestia re-entered the cage, but was hit with Líder's finishing maneuver, the Líder Storm. Nicho hit Líder with a reverse STO and Psycho with a steel chair, before starting to follow Bestia out of the cage. Líder, however, stopped his climb by throwing a steel chair to his back, before laying him down onto a table. Psycho Clown climbed to the top of the cage and leapt off, putting Nicho through the table with a splash and then followed Líder out of the cage, winning the match for his team.

The pay-per-view concluded with Damián 666, Halloween and Nicho el Millonario having their heads shaved as per stipulation, after which Nicho was stretchered backstage, while Halloween and Damián praised their opponents on the house microphone, admitting that they had proven their superiority.

== Aftermath ==
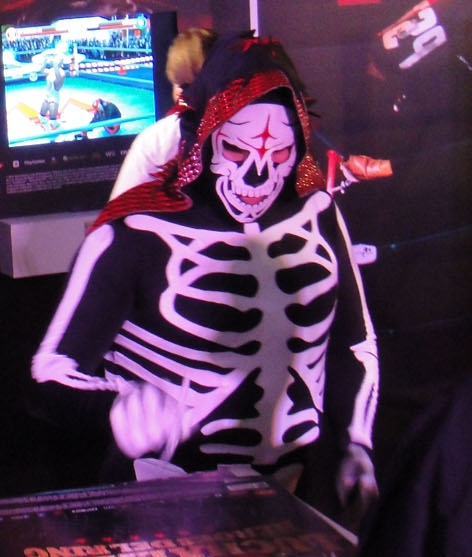
La Parka, who during the event turned villainous for the first time in over a decade

On October 20, Octagón spoke about his turn in a video posted on AAA's official website, claiming that he was tired of Joaquín Roldán's mismanagement of AAA and that Dorian's vision of AAA was closer to Antonio Peña's original vision of the promotion. The following day at the first post-Héroes Inmortales television tapings, La Parka explained the reasons behind his turn, claiming that after 15 years of loyal service, AAA betrayed him by bringing back L.A. Park and then the fans turned on him by deciding to root for not only Park, but also Cibernético over him during his past two rivalries. On November 5, Octagón was named the new leader of La Milicia. Following the event, El Brazo introduced his exótico persona named "La Braza" and sided with Cassandro and Pimpinela Escarlata in their rivalry against Nygma, Pasión Crystal, Polvo de Estrellas and Yuriko.

== Reception ==
Following the event, sports website MedioTiempo's number one story was the double turn of Octagón and La Parka, which the site referred to as one of the most shocking moments in the history of AAA. The site also called the match and the result between El Mesías and Sting "disappointing" and the main event "memorable". Mexico's number one professional wrestling publication, Súper Luchas, offered praise to the Tables, Ladders, and Chairs match, calling it "excellent".

== Results ==
No.	Results	Stipulations	Times
1	La Legión Extranjera (Jennifer Blake, Sexy Star and Velvet Sky) defeated Cynthia Moreno, Faby Apache and Mari Apache	Six-woman tag team Glow in the Dark match	09:51
2	El Elegido, Octagóncito and Pimpinela Escarlata defeated Alan Stone, Mini Histeria and Polvo de Estrellas	Six-man tag team lumberjack match	08:14
3	La Legión Extranjera (Abyss and Chessman) defeated Extreme Tiger and Jack Evans (c)	Tables, Ladders, and Chairs match for the AAA World Tag Team Championship	13:16
4	Electroshock defeated Cibernético, Jeff Jarrett (with Karen Jarrett), Joe Líder, L.A. Park, La Parka, Magnus, Silver King and El Zorro	Copa Antonio Peña gauntlet match	20:53
5	El Mesías vs. Sting ended in a no contest	Singles match	08:51
6	Dr. Wagner Jr. (c) (with Octagón) defeated El Hijo del Perro Aguayo (with Konan Big and Silver King)	Bullterrier match for the AAA Latin American Championship	13:40
7	Los Psycho Circus (Monster Clown, Murder Clown and Psycho Clown) (with Mini Clown) defeated Los Perros del Mal (Damián 666, Halloween and Nicho el Millonario)	Six-man tag team steel cage Masks vs. Hairs match	17:48
(c) / – the champion(s) heading into the match

=== Copa Antonio Peña entrances and eliminations ===
Wrestlers entered the ring every 60 seconds.

Entry order	Entrant	Elimination order	Eliminated by	Time
1	La Parka	2	L.A. Park	5:08
2	L.A. Park	8	Electroshock	20:53
3	Silver King	3	Electroshock	6:23
4	Electroshock	WINNER	–	12:55
5	Cibernético	1	Silver King	1:29
6	El Zorro	4	L.A. Park	4:48
7	Jeff Jarrett	7	L.A. Park	10:07
8	Joe Líder	6	L.A. Park	5:21
9	Magnus	5	Electroshock	2:52
