= Verano de Escándalo (2015) =

2015 Lucha Libre AAA World Wide event

- Official poster featuring wrestlers from all matches except the first one.
- Promotion: Lucha Libre AAA World Wide
- Date: June 14, 2015
- City: Monterrey, Nuevo León, Mexico
- Venue: Arena Monterrey
- Attendance: 7,000

Event chronology
← Previous; Lucha Libre World Cup	Next → Triplemanía XXIII

Verano de Escándalo chronology
← Previous; 2014	Next → 2017

Verano de Escándalo (2015) (Spanish for "Summer of Scandal") was a professional wrestling pay-per-view event produced by the Lucha Libre AAA World Wide (AAA) promotion, which took place on June 14, 2015 in "Arena Monterrey" in Monterrey, Nuevo León, Mexico. The event has been a regular summer event for AAA since 1997, only skipping the event in 2012 and 2013, 2015 marked the 17th time AAA has held such an event.

== Production ==
=== Background ===
First held during the summer of 1997 the Mexican professional wrestling, company Lucha Libre AAA World Wide (AAA, or Triple A) began holding a major wrestling show during the summer, most often in September, called Verano de Escándalo ("Summer of Scandal"). The Verano de Escándalo show was an annual event from 1997 until 2011, then AAA did not hold a show in 2012 and 2013 before bringing the show back in 2014, but this time in June, putting it at the time AAA previously held their Triplemanía show. In 2012 and 2013 Triplemanía XX and Triplemanía XXI was held in August instead of the early summer. The show often features championship matches or Lucha de Apuestas or bet matches where the competitors risked their wrestling mask or hair on the outcome of the match. In Lucha Libre the Lucha de Apuetas match is considered more prestigious than a championship match and a lot of the major shows feature one or more Apuesta matches. The 2015 Verano de Escándalo show was the 17th show in the series.

=== Storylines ===
The Verano de Escándalo show featured six professional wrestling matches with different wrestlers involved in pre-existing, scripted feuds, plots, and storylines. Wrestlers were portrayed as either heels (referred to as rudos in Mexico, those that portray the "bad guys") or faces (técnicos in Mexico, the "good guy" characters) as they followed a series of tension-building events, which culminated in a wrestling match or series of matches.

== Results ==
No.	Results	Stipulations
1	Machine Rocker, Mamba, Mini Psycho Clown and Taya defeated Dinastía, El Elegido, Faby Apache and Pimpinela Escarlata	Eight-person mixed tag team match
2	Drago defeated Aero Star, Bengala, Daga, Fénix, El Hijo del Fantasma, Laredo Kid, Súper Fly, Súper Nova and Steve Pain	2015 Alas de Oro tournament, 10-man elimination match
3	Los Hell Brothers (Averno, Chessman and Cibernético) defeated Los Psycho Circus (Monster Clown, Murder Clown and Psycho Clown) (c) and Holocausto (Electroshock, Hijo de Pirata Morgan and La Parka Negra)	Three-way six-man tag team match for the AAA World Trios Championship
4	Los Güeros del Cielo (Angélico and Jack Evans) defeated The Black Family (Dark Cuervo and Dark Escoria)	Tag team Lucha de Apuestas steel cage match
5	El Patrón Alberto (c) (with Blue Demon Jr.) defeated Brian Cage (with El Texano Jr.) by disqualification	Singles match for the AAA Mega Championship
6	Myzteziz, La Parka and Rey Mysterio Jr. defeated Johnny Mundo, El Mesias and Pentagón Jr.	Six-man tag team match
(c) / – the champion(s) heading into the match
