= Eugenio Torres =

Eugenio Torres may refer to:

- Eugenio Torres Larrañaga (1889–?), Chilean politician
- Eugenio Torres de Velasco (1805–1866), Chilean politician, president of the Senate in 1864–1865
- Eugenio Torres Villarreal ("Konan Big", born 1964), Mexican wrestler and TV host

== See also ==
- Eugenio Torre (born 1951), Filipino chess grandmaster
