= Dinastía =

Mexican professional wrestler

Personal information
- Born: July 20, 1994 (age 32) Tulancingo, Hidalgo, Mexico

Professional wrestling career
- Ring name(s): Dinastía; Pequeno Guerrero
- Billed height: 1.51 m (4 ft 11 1/2 in)
- Billed weight: 60 kg (130 lb)
- Trained by: Super Crazy; Taz El Feroz
- Debut: 2005

Dinastía (born July 20, 1994) is the ring name of a Mexican professional wrestler. He competed in the Mini-Estrella division for Lucha Libre AAA Worldwide where he is a two-time AAA World Mini-Estrella Champion. He holds the record for most days as Mini-Estrella Champion. His real name is not a matter of public record, as is often the case with masked wrestlers in Mexico, where their private lives are kept a secret from the wrestling fans. Dinastía is a nephew of Super Crazy, Taz El Feroz and Crazy Boy and the older brother of Lanzeloth.

== Professional wrestling career ==
On February 18, 2013, Dinastía defeated Mini Psicosis to win the AAA World Mini-Estrella Championship. His first reign, which lasted for four years and three months, ended when he lost it to Mini Psycho Clown on May 26, 2017. Dinastía would regain the title from Mini Psycho Clown on March 16, 2019, in a six way match that also involved Mini Monster Clown, Mini Murder Clown, La Parkita, and La Parkita Negra. In 2020, he won the Lucha Fighter Minis Tournament.

== Championships and accomplishments ==
- Lucha Libre AAA Worldwide
  - AAA World Mini-Estrella Championship (2 times)
  - AAA Quien Pinta Para La Corona (2011)
  - Lucha Fighter (Minis 2020)
- Wrestling Observer Newsletter

- Rookie of the Year (2012)

== Luchas de Apuestas record ==
Winner (wager)	Loser (wager)	Location	Event	Date	Notes
Dinastía (mask)	Black Master (mask)	Centro Banamex	Live event	July 26, 2009	(Note: Ruleta de la Muerte that also included Flamita, Drastik Boy, Hormiga, Masivo and Disturbio))
