= Mini Charly Manson =

Mexican professional wrestler

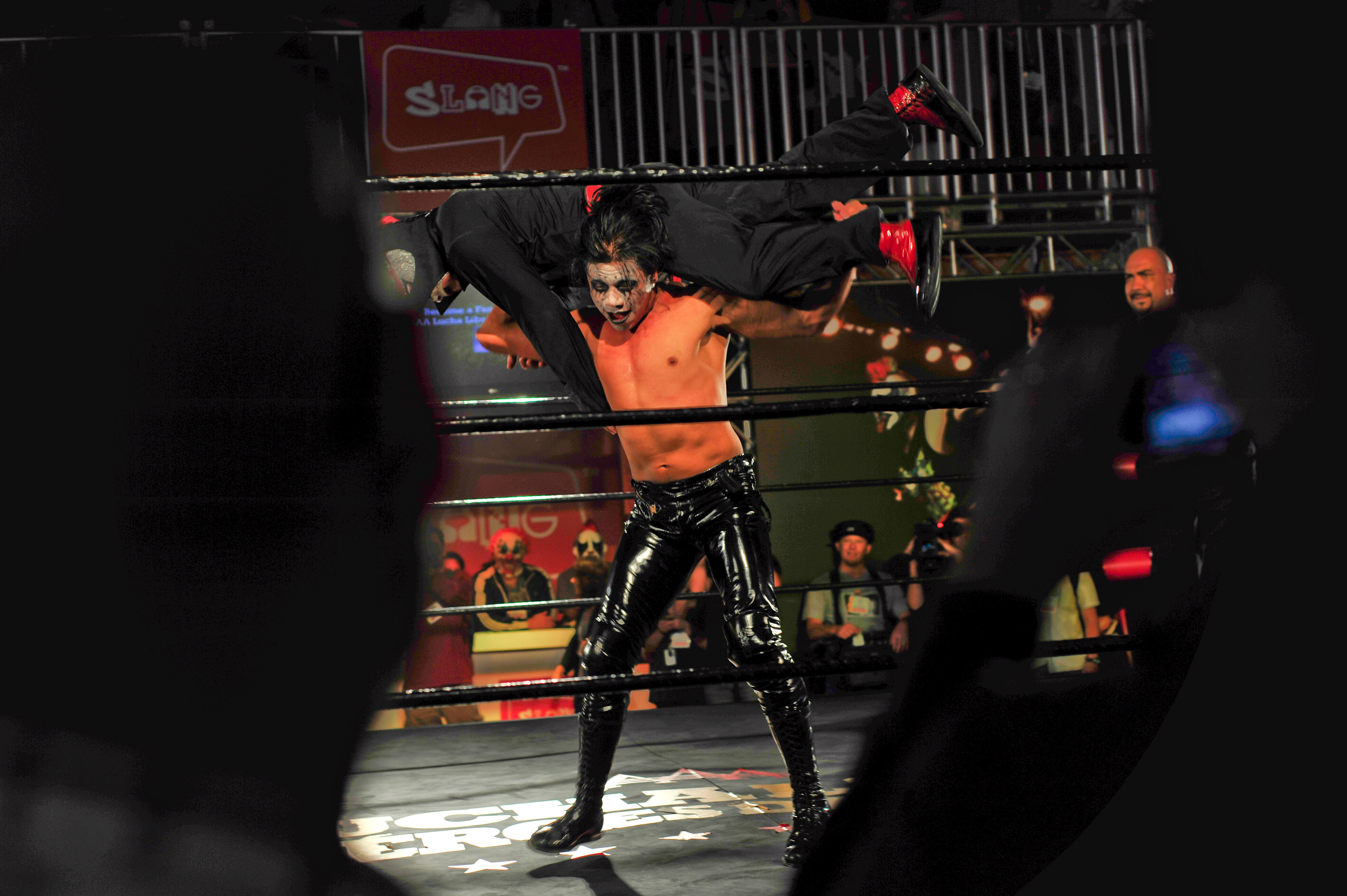
- Mini Charly Manson with Octagoncito on his shoulders

Personal information
- Born: Arturo Santos Hernández; July 9, 1987 (age 39)

Professional wrestling career
- Ring name(s): Mini Charly Manson; Mini Sky Black; Tiago
- Trained by: Tom Mix, Jr. Gran Apache
- Debut: 2004

Arturo Santos Hernández (born July 9, 1987) is a Mexican professional wrestler and bodybuilder, best known by his ring name Mini Charly Manson. For years he worked in the Mini-Estrella division for Lucha Libre AAA World Wide (AAA), and was the first holder of the AAA World Mini-Estrella Championship. After leaving AAA, he uses the ring name Tiago, in competition on the independent circuit against regular sized competitors. He is not to be confused Charly Manson Jr. who sometimes works under the name Mini Charly Manson.

== Professional wrestling career ==
Arturo Santos trained for a professional wrestling career under Tom Mix Jr. a wrestler who has trained a number of people who have later competed in Mexico's Mini-Estrella division. Working in the Mini division does not automatically mean that Santos has dwarfism as several short wrestlers work in the "Mini" division, including Mini Abismo Negro. He made his debut in 2004 working under the ring name "Mini Sky Black", working with various Mini-Estrellas on the Mexican Independent circuit.

In mid-2006 Santos began working for Lucha Libre AAA World Wide (AAA), one of Mexico's two largest wrestling companies. In AAA he was given a new ring name and look, as he was turned into "Mini Charly Manson", a Mascota version of Charly Manson, complete with facepaint, wrestling outfit and entrance music. Initially he worked as a Rudo (bad guy) teaming up with other Mascota variations of Charly Manson's allies such as Mini Cuervo. His first storyline feud was against Mascarita Divina, a técnico (good guy) Mini-Estrella who happened to be Santos' cousin, although that fact was not revealed to the general audience. He worked storylines against Mascarita Sagrada and Octagoncito that people predicted would end in a Lucha de Apuesta, or bet matches, between the wrestlers but Mini Charly Manson turned técnico before such matches could happen. Mini Manson's turn mirrored the turn of the regular sized Manson, in this case it was initiated by an attack from Mini Abismo Negro which turned Mini Charly Manson from a hated character to a sympathetic one that the crowd could get behind. At one point Mini Charly Manson participated in a two and a half month tour of the United States with fellow AAA wrestlers Psicosis II, Decnnis, Súper AAA and Mini Chessman to showcase Lucha Libre.

During the summer of 2008 AAA held a tournament to crown the first ever AAA World Mini-Estrella Championship. The tournament saw Mini Charly Manson defeat Jerrito Estrada in the first round, then he defeated Mascarita Sagrada on August 17, 2008, to qualify for the final match. The finals took place at AAA's 2008 Verano de Escandalo and saw Mini Charly Manson defeat Octagoncito and Mini Abismo Negro to become the first ever AAA World Mini-Estrella Champion. Mini Manson would not defend the title for over a year, due to first suffering a knee injury, then a nose injury that kept him from wrestling a full schedule. It would be 453 days after he won the title that Mini Charly Manson finally defended the title. The match was a Battle Royal and also included |Mascarita Divina, Mini Histeria, Mascarita Sagrada, Mini Psicosis, La Parkita, Octagoncito, Mini Chessman and match winner Mini Abismo Negro, who also won the Championship. At Triplemanía XVIII Octagoncito outlasted eight other wrestlers including Mini Charly Manson in a Tables, Ladders and Chairs match to become the new AAA Mini-Estrellas Champion.

== Championships and accomplishments ==
- Bodybuilding
  - Mexican Federation of Bodybuilding and Fitness
    - 2015 Mr. México - Professional Wrestler (-80 kg) - 2nd Place
  - Musclemanía México
    - 2015 Musclemanía Prestige - Beginners (Class A) - 1st Place
- Professional wrestling
  - Lucha Libre AAA World Wide
    - AAA World Mini-Estrella Championship (1 time)
  - The Crash Lucha Libre
    - The Crash Junior Championship (1 time)
