= Mascarita Divina =

Mexican professional wrestler (born 1990)

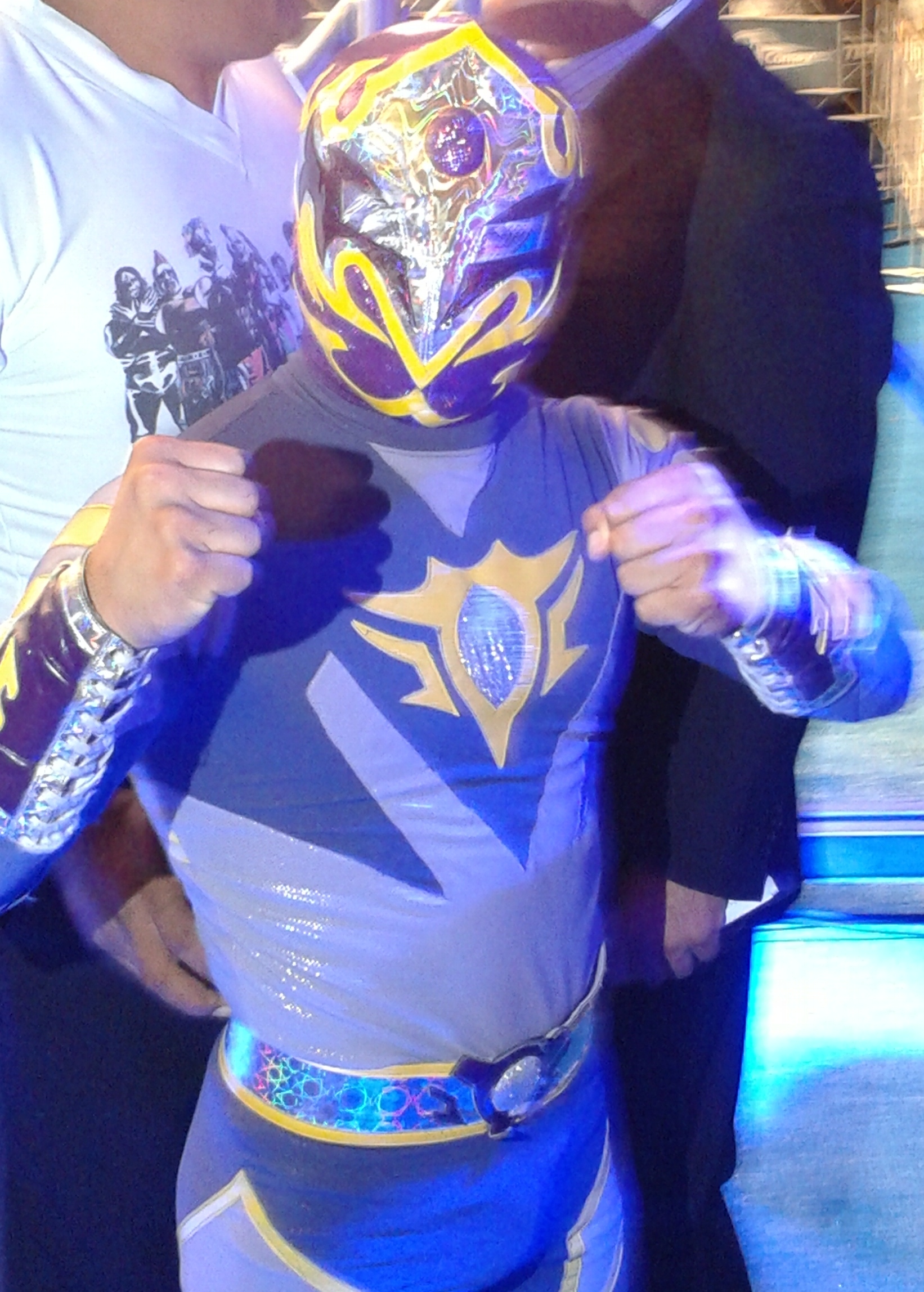
- Divina in August 2012.

Personal information
- Born: March 1, 1983 (age 43) Mexico city
- Family: Mini Charly Manson (brother)

Professional wrestling career
- Ring name(s): Mascarita Divina; Mini Drago
- Billed height: 1.56 m (5 ft 1 1/2 in)
- Billed weight: 75 kg (165 lb)
- Debut: No later than 2007

Mascarita Divina (born December 1, 1990) is the ring name of a Mexican professional wrestler. Divina works for Lucha Libre AAA World Wide in their Mini-Estrella division. Mascarita Divina's name is Spanish for "Little Divine Mask", taken after the name of the regular sized Máscara Divina who he's a mascota version off. Mascarita Divina's real name is not a matter of public record, as is often the case with masked wrestlers in Mexico where their private lives are kept a secret from the wrestling fans. Working in the Mini division does not automatically mean that he has dwarfism as several short wrestlers work in the "Mini" division. In 2014 he was given the name "Mini Drago", based on the AAA wrestler Drago

== Professional wrestling career ==
Since Mascarita Divina is an masked it is not known if he has wrestled before he made his debut as Mascarita Divina in 2007. He was brought in as a Mini-Estrella version of Máscara Divina. Upon his debut Mascarita Divina began a feud with the rúdo (bad guy) Mini Charly Manson, a feud that resulted in Mascarita Divina making his first major show appearance for AAA at the 2007 Rey de Reyes where he teamed with Mascarita Sagrada 2000 and Octagoncito to defeat Mini Charly Manson, Mini Abismo Negro and Mini Chessman in the opening match of the show. It was later revealed that Mascarita Divina and Mini Charly Manson were actually cousins, although the relationship has not been acknowledged on television. On September 3, 2007, Mascarita Divina travelled to Japan along with a number of AAA wrestlers to wrestle on a AAA/NOAH co-promoted show called TripleSEM where he teamed with Octagoncito to defeat Los Mini Vipers (Mini Histeria and Mini Abismo Negro). Divina also wrestled in the opening match of the first Antonio Peña Memorial show, teaming with Octagoncito and La Parkita to defeat Los Mini Vipers (Mini Charly Manson, Mini Chessman and Mini Histeria). at the following year's Antonio Peña Memorial show he teamed up with his cousin Mini Charly Manson, (who had turned técnico (good guy) over the preceding year, and Octagoncito to defeat Mascarita de la Muerte, Mini Chessman and Mini Histeria.

At the 2009 Guerra de Titanes show Divina was one of nine Mini-Estrellas who competed in a battle royal for the AAA World Mini-Estrella Championship. Divina was the first wrestler eliminated from the match after being accidentally injured by Mini Abismo Negro when a move was not executed properly and had to be removed from the ring on a stretcher. It was later revealed that he had broken his tibia and fibula during the match and unable to wrestle for six months. In May, 2010 AAA announced that they were planning to hold the first ever Mini-Estrellas Tables, Ladders, and Chairs match at Triplemanía XVIII where Mini Abismo Negro would defend the title against six challengers, including Mascarita Divina. In the weeks leading up to the event Mini Abismo Negro, Mini Histeria and Mini Psicosis defeated Mascarita Divina, Mini Charly Manson and Octagoncito in a match that featured the use of both tables, ladders and chairs to preview the Triplemanía XVIII match. During the match Mascarita Divina was seemingly injured as he had to be helped from the ring after the match. At Triplemanía XVIII Octagoncito outlasted eight other wrestlers (La Parkita and Mini Chessman were late additions to the match) in the TLC match to become the new AAA Mini-Estrellas Champion.
