= The Hybrid 2 =

Professional wrestling tag team

Statistics
- Members: Angélico; Jack Evans
- Name(s): Angélico and Jack Evans; Los Güeros del Cielo; The Hybrid 2
- Billed heights: Angélico: 6 ft 3 in (1.91 m); Evans: 5 ft 8 in (1.73 m)
- Combined billed weight: 379 lb (172 kg)
- Debut: 2013
- Years active: 2013–2017; 2019–2022

The Hybrid 2 (TH2) were a professional wrestling tag team that consisted of Angélico and Jack Evans. They have previously competed in Mexico's Lucha Libre AAA Worldwide (AAA) - where they were three-time AAA World Tag Team Champions - and U.S. independent promotion Pro Wrestling Guerrilla (PWG) as Los Güeros del Cielo (English: "The Sky Blondes" or "The White Boys From Heaven").

== History ==
=== Lucha Libre AAA Worldwide (2013–2016) ===
In 2013, when Angélico made his return to Lucha Libre AAA Worldwide he began teaming up with Jack Evans under the team name Los Güeros del Cielo ("The Sky Blondes"). Their first PPV match came at AAA's biggest show of the year, Triplemanía XXI, in a five-way elimination tag team match for the vacant AAA World Tag Team Championship. On October 18, 2013, at Héroes Inmortales VII, Angélico and Evans won a four-way match to become the new AAA World Tag Team Champions. At Triplemanía XXII, both Angélico and Evans were part of a ten-way elimination match to unify the AAA Fusión and AAA Cruiserweight Championships. On December 7, 2014, at Guerra de Titanes Angélico and Evans lost the AAA World Tag Team Championships to Joe Líder and Pentagón Jr. in a three-way tag team match that also included Fénix and Myzteziz. Evans and Angélico then entered a feud with The Black Family (Dark Cuervo and Dark Escoria), which culminated on June 14, 2015, at Verano de Escándalo, where Evans and Angélico were victorious in a steel cage Lucha de Apuestas. As per stipulation, Cuervo and Escoria were forced to have their heads shaved following the match.

On August 9, 2015, at Triplemanía XXIII, Los Hell Brothers (Averno, Chessman and Cibernético) defeated Fénix and Los Güeros del Cielo (Angélico and Jack Evans) and El Hijo del Fantasma, Pentagón Jr., El Texano Jr. in a Three-way trios steel cage match to retain the AAA World Trios Championship. On October 4, 2015, at Héroes Inmortales IX, Evans and Angélico regained the AAA World Tag Team Championship defeating Líder and Pentagón Jr. in a three-way match, which also involved Daga and Steve Pain. They vacated the title on January 22, 2016, due to Angélico suffering a leg injury. On July 17, 2016, Angélico and Evans won the AAA World Tag Team Championship for the third time.

=== Pro Wrestling Guerrilla (2015) ===
On July 24, 2015. Evans and Angélico made their Pro Wrestling Guerrilla debut as a tag team unsuccessfully challenging The Young Bucks for the PWG World Tag Team Championship. On August 28, 2015, Evans and Angélico returned to PWG at Battle of Los Angeles 2015 defeating The Inner City Machine Guns (Rich Swann and Ricochet).

=== All Elite Wrestling (2019–2022) ===
On May 9, 2019, Angélico and Jack Evans signed with All Elite Wrestling (AEW) The team made their debut at AEW's inaugural pay-per-view event Double or Nothing on May 25, losing to Best Friends (Trent Beretta and Chuck Taylor). At Fight for the Fallen on July 13, they competed in a three-way tag team match against Jungle Boy and Luchasaurus and The Dark Order (Evil Uno and Stu Grayson), which the Dark Order won. At the All Out "Buy In" pre-show on August 31, they lost to Private Party (Isiah Kassidy and Marq Quen). On the October 8 episode of AEW Dark, they debuted as "The Hybrid 2" (TH2), teaming with the Lucha Brothers (Fénix and Pentagón Jr.) to obtain their first win in AEW, defeating Best Friends and Private Party in an eight man tag team match. Evans left the promotion in May 2022.

== Championships and accomplishments ==
- Lucha Libre AAA Worldwide
  - AAA World Tag Team Championship (3 times)

== Luchas de Apuestas record ==
Winner (wager)	Loser (wager)	Location	Event	Date	Notes
Angélico (hair) and Jack Evans (hair)	Dark Cuervo (hair) and Dark Escoria (hair)	Monterrey, Nuevo León	Verano de Escándalo	June 14, 2015	(Note: Steel cage match.)
