= Tables, ladders, and chairs match =

Professional wrestling match type

A tables, ladders, and chairs match, often abbreviated as TLC, is a type of professional wrestling match that originated within the World Wrestling Federation (WWF, now WWE).

The TLC match is a variation of a ladder match, which is modified to co-emphasize two other weapons: tables and chairs. The goal is to acquire the item (usually championship belts) which starts the match suspended above the ring. A TLC match can be seen as a more complicated ladder match, where tables and chairs, along with ladders, can also be used as legal foreign objects.

TLC matches that could also exist as a variation of a hardcore match, where tables, ladders, and chairs can also be used as legal foreign objects, but the only way to win this variation of the TLC match is by pinfall or submission.

== Origin ==
The match originates around the tag teams of The Dudley Boyz, The Hardy Boyz, and Edge and Christian. The particular weapons of tables, ladders and chairs were seen as unique to each team's style. The Hardys were seen as high-flying daredevils with a penchant for using ladders, the Dudley Boyz would often use tables as weapons, and Edge and Christian became notable for using steel chairs in tandem against opponents.

== WWF/WWE ==
World Wrestling Federation created and adapted the matches to make it known today as a TLC match. The idea of the TLC match in WWF had its origins in a tag team ladder match for the managerial services of Terri Runnels between Edge and Christian and The Hardy Boyz (Matt Hardy and Jeff Hardy), at No Mercy 1999 during the Attitude Era, with the audience giving all four wrestlers a standing ovation at the end of the match. The move catapulted both tag teams to the top of the tag team world. The following months had The Hardy Boyz face The Dudley Boyz, (Bubba Ray Dudley and D-Von Dudley) at the Royal Rumble 2000, in a violent and chaotic tag-team Tables match, where ladders and chairs were used as much as tables, had similar success.

The three teams would be known for their three respective foreign objects, as well as the hardcore wrestling styles associated therein: the Dudley Boyz often Powerbombed or Death Dropped their opponents through tables during or after matches (usually brought out by Bubba Ray telling D-Von to "get the tables"); the Hardy Boyz, in singles matches, challenged main-event singles wrestlers (such as The Undertaker) in ladder matches, considered at that time to be the "signature match" of the team (as they were both high-flyers, they specialized with high spots, and doing them off the top of ladders amplified their effectiveness), while Edge and Christian developed the "con-chair-to", which involved the two hitting an opponent's head simultaneously, on opposite sides, with chairs. Eventually, the three teams were brought together in a triangle ladder match at WrestleMania 2000, in what was the forerunner of the TLC in terms of the spots involved (tables were involved in some of the major spots, including Jeff's big Swanton Bomb on Bubba Ray far from the ring, even though it was technically a ladder match).

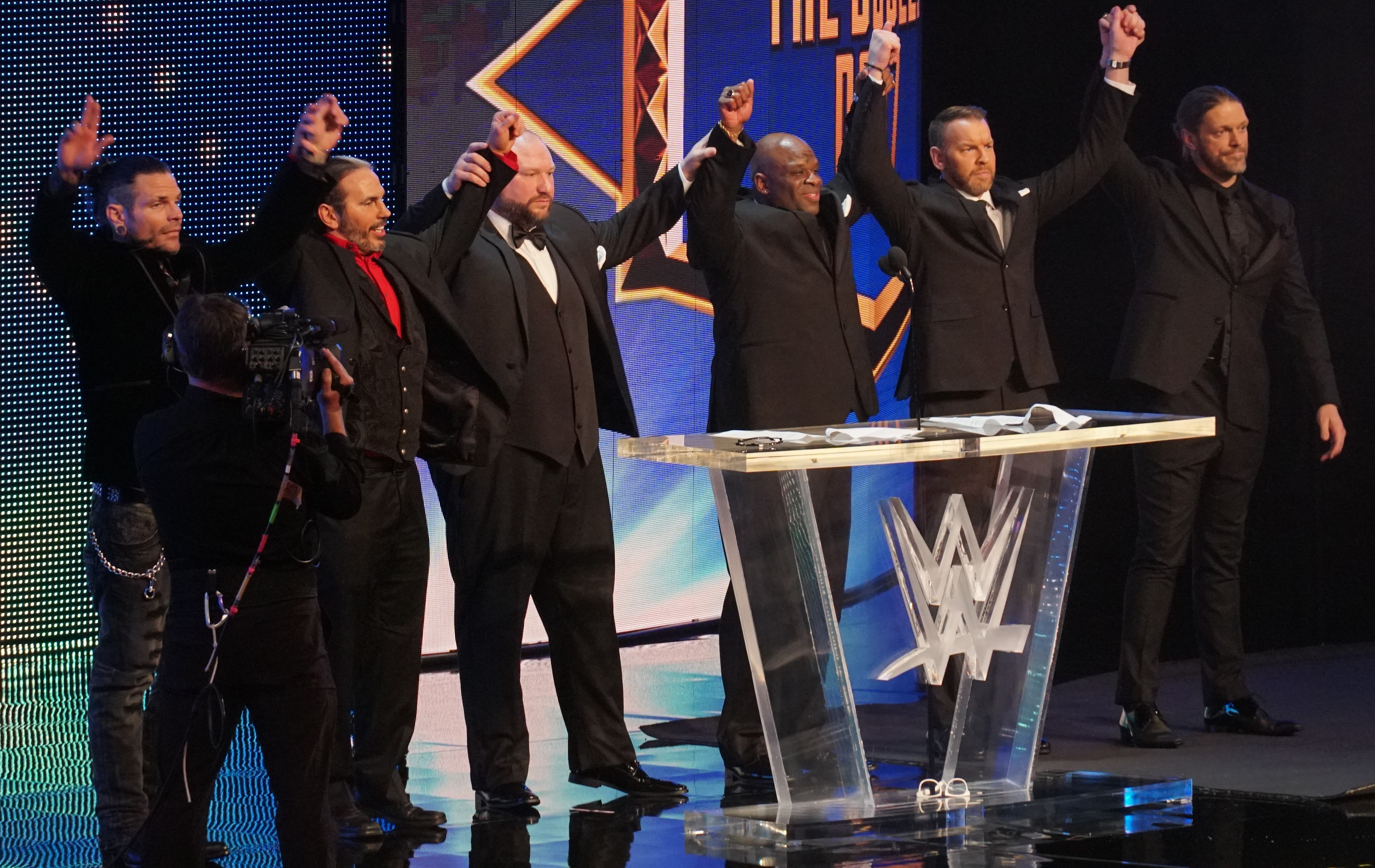
The participants in the first TLC match. From left to right: Jeff Hardy, Matt Hardy, Bubba Ray Dudley, D-Von Dudley, Christian, and Edge

The first official TLC match was contested between these three teams using the weapons that they had made famous at SummerSlam 2000. These matches frequently involved members of these three teams, and are largely remembered for the dangerous stunts, object destruction, chaotic pace, injuries and length.

The second TLC match happened at WrestleMania X-Seven, with each of the three teams joined by a third member who tried to help their team win the match (Matt and Jeff were joined by Lita, who had also been with them for the SummerSlam bout, Bubba Ray and D-Von were joined by their half-brother Spike, and Edge and Christian were joined by Rhyno). Lita hit Spike Dudley with a chair shot to the head, Christian and D-Von Dudley hung 20 feet in the air, Bubba Ray Dudley and Matt Hardy jumped off a toppling ladder (pushed over by Rhyno) and crashed through 4 stacked tables on ringside, and Edge speared a hanging Jeff Hardy by jumping off a 20-ft ladder. After TLC I and II, every subsequent TLC match was toned down to reduce the high risks and dangers they posed.

=== Tables, Ladders and Chairs matches ===
No.	Match	Stipulations	Event	Date	Location	Length
1	Edge and Christian (c) defeated The Hardy Boyz (Matt Hardy and Jeff Hardy) and The Dudley Boyz (Bubba Ray Dudley and D-Von Dudley)	Triple threat tag team TLC match for the WWF Tag Team Championship	SummerSlam	August 27, 2000	Raleigh, North Carolina	14:51
2	Edge and Christian defeated The Hardy Boyz (Matt Hardy and Jeff Hardy) and The Dudley Boyz (Bubba Ray Dudley and D-Von Dudley) (c)	Triple threat tag team TLC match for the WWF Tag Team Championship	WrestleMania X-Seven	April 1, 2001	Houston, Texas	15:53
3	Chris Jericho and Chris Benoit (c) defeated Edge and Christian, The Dudley Boyz (Bubba Ray Dudley and D-Von Dudley), and The Hardy Boyz (Matt Hardy and Jeff Hardy)	Fatal 4-way tag team TLC match for the WWF Tag Team Championship	WWF SmackDown!	May 24, 2001	Anaheim, California	21:00
4	Kane (c) (Note: Originally The Hurricane was to defend the titles with Kane, but was taken out before the match.) defeated The Dudley Boyz (Bubba Ray Dudley and Spike Dudley), Christian and Chris Jericho, and Jeff Hardy and Rob Van Dam	Fatal 4-way tag team TLC match for the World Tag Team Championship	WWE Raw Roulette	October 7, 2002	Las Vegas, Nevada	25:08
5	Edge (c) defeated Ric Flair	Singles TLC match for the WWE Championship	Raw	January 16, 2006	Raleigh, North Carolina	16:40
6	John Cena defeated Edge (c)	Singles TLC match for the WWE Championship	Unforgiven	September 17, 2006	Toronto, Ontario, Canada	25:28
7	Edge defeated The Undertaker	Singles TLC match for the vacant World Heavyweight Championship; since Undertaker lost, he was forced to leave WWE	One Night Stand	June 1, 2008	San Diego, California	23:50
8	CM Punk defeated Jeff Hardy (c)	Singles TLC match for the World Heavyweight Championship	SummerSlam	August 23, 2009	Los Angeles, California	21:34
9	D-Generation X (Triple H and Shawn Michaels) defeated Jeri-Show (Chris Jericho and Big Show) (c)	Tag team TLC match for the Unified WWE Tag Team Championship	TLC: Tables, Ladders & Chairs	December 13, 2009	San Antonio, Texas	22:32
10	The Miz (c) defeated Jerry Lawler	Singles TLC match for the WWE Championship	Raw	November 29, 2010	Philadelphia, Pennsylvania	11:52
11	Edge defeated Kane (c), Alberto Del Rio and Rey Mysterio	Fatal 4-way TLC match for the World Heavyweight Championship	TLC: Tables, Ladders & Chairs	December 19, 2010	Houston, Texas	22:47
12	CM Punk (c) defeated The Miz and Alberto Del Rio	Triple threat TLC match for the WWE Championship	TLC: Tables, Ladders & Chairs	December 18, 2011	Baltimore, Maryland	18:25
13	The Shield (Dean Ambrose, Seth Rollins and Roman Reigns) defeated Team Hell No (Kane and Daniel Bryan) and Ryback	Six-man tag team TLC match	TLC: Tables, Ladders & Chairs	December 16, 2012	Brooklyn, New York	22:46
14	CM Punk (c) defeated Ryback	Singles TLC match for the WWE Championship	Raw	January 7, 2013	Tampa, Florida	18:52
15	Randy Orton (c - WWE) defeated John Cena (c - World)	Champion vs. Champion TLC match to unify the World Heavyweight Championship & WWE Championship	TLC: Tables, Ladders & Chairs	December 15, 2013	Houston, Texas	24:36
16	El Torito defeated Hornswoggle	WeeLC match (Note: This match was not a TLC ladder match, rather, it was a traditional singles match won by pinfall, countout or submission.)	Extreme Rules	May 4, 2014	East Rutherford, New Jersey	10:53
17	Bray Wyatt defeated Dean Ambrose	Singles TLC match	TLC: Tables, Ladders & Chairs	December 14, 2014	Cleveland, Ohio	26:58
18	Sheamus (c) defeated Roman Reigns	Singles TLC match for the WWE World Heavyweight Championship	TLC: Tables, Ladders & Chairs	December 13, 2015	Boston, Massachusetts	23:58
19	AJ Styles (c) defeated Dean Ambrose	Singles TLC match for the WWE World Championship	TLC: Tables, Ladders & Chairs	December 4, 2016	Dallas, Texas	30:50
20	The Shield (Dean Ambrose and Seth Rollins) and Kurt Angle defeated The Miz, Braun Strowman, Kane and Cesaro and Sheamus	5-on-3 Handicap TLC match	TLC: Tables, Ladders & Chairs	October 22, 2017	Minneapolis, Minnesota	35:25
21	Seth Rollins (c) defeated Baron Corbin	Singles TLC match for the WWE Intercontinental Championship	Raw	December 10, 2018	San Diego, California	24:30
22	Braun Strowman defeated Baron Corbin	Singles TLC match; since Strowman won, he earned a Universal Championship match at the Royal Rumble and Corbin was stripped of all authoritative power; had Corbin won, he would have become the permanent general manager of the Raw brand	TLC: Tables, Ladders & Chairs	December 16, 2018	San Jose, California	16:00
23	Asuka defeated Becky Lynch (c) and Charlotte Flair	Triple threat TLC match for the WWE SmackDown Women's Championship	TLC: Tables, Ladders & Chairs	December 16, 2018	San Jose, California	21:45
24	King Corbin defeated Roman Reigns	Singles TLC match	TLC: Tables, Ladders & Chairs	December 15, 2019	Minneapolis, Minnesota	22:20
25	The Kabuki Warriors (Asuka and Kairi Sane) (c) defeated Becky Lynch and Charlotte Flair	Tag team TLC match for the WWE Women's Tag Team Championship	TLC: Tables, Ladders & Chairs	December 15, 2019	Minneapolis, Minnesota	26:00
26	Io Shirai (c) defeated Candice LeRae	Singles Tables, Ladders, and Scares match for the NXT Women's Championship	NXT: Halloween Havoc	October 28, 2020	Orlando, Florida	16:30
27	Drew McIntyre (c) defeated AJ Styles and The Miz (Note: The match started as it was originally scheduled in which Drew McIntyre was defending the WWE Championship against AJ Styles in a singles TLC match, but midway through, The Miz cashed in his Money in the Bank contract, converting the match into a Triple Threat. However it was revealed that since John Morrison cashed in the contract on Miz's behalf, the cash-in was nullified - since only the contract holder is permitted to cash-in the contract - and the contract was returned to Miz.)	Triple threat TLC match for the WWE Championship	TLC: Tables, Ladders & Chairs	December 20, 2020	St. Petersburg, Florida	27:05
28	Roman Reigns (c) defeated Kevin Owens	Singles TLC match for the WWE Universal Championship	TLC: Tables, Ladders & Chairs	December 20, 2020	St. Petersburg, Florida	24:45
29	The Creed Brothers (Brutus Creed and Julius Creed) defeated Angel Garza and Humberto Carrillo	Tag team Tables, Ladders, and Scares match (Note: This match was not a traditional TLC ladder match, rather, it was a traditional tag team tornado match won by pinfall, countout or submission where tables, ladders and chairs were the only legal weapons. Unlike a ladder match where there is always something at stake, nothing was at stake in this match.)	NXT: Halloween Havoc	October 31, 2023	Orlando, Florida	14:03
30	Tony D'Angelo (c) defeated Oba Femi	Singles Tables, Ladders, and Scares match for the NXT North American Championship (Note: This match was not a traditional TLC ladder match, rather, it was a traditional singles match won by pinfall, countout or submission where tables, ladders and chairs were the only legal weapons.)	NXT Halloween Havoc	October 27, 2024	Hershey, Pennsylvania	15:20
31	The Street Profits (Montez Ford and Angelo Dawkins) (c) defeated #DIY (Johnny Gargano and Tommaso Ciampa) and Motor City Machine Guns (Chris Sabin and Alex Shelley)	Triple threat tag team TLC match for the WWE Tag Team Championship	SmackDown	April 25, 2025	Fort Worth, Texas	22:56
32	The Wyatt Sicks (Dexter Lumis and Joe Gacy) (c) defeated Andrade and Rey Fénix, #DIY (Johnny Gargano and Tommaso Ciampa), Fraxiom (Nathan Frazer and Axiom), Motor City Machine Guns (Chris Sabin and Alex Shelley), and The Street Profits (Montez Ford and Angelo Dawkins)	Six-Pack tag team TLC match for the WWE Tag Team Championship	SummerSlam	August 3, 2025	East Rutherford, New Jersey	16:00

== Usage in other promotions ==
=== Extreme Championship Wrestling ===
In other promotions, the TLC match has quite the following, appealing to a niche market within professional wrestling. Predating the TLC matches, two "Tables and Ladders matches" took place. These were traditional matches won by pinfall or submission, not by climbing the ladder for the belts. However, the term "TLC" itself was trademarked by WWE, thus other promotions give different names to these types of matches despite having an identical setup. In more hardcore-style promotions, the chairs were often replaced, or were used alongside, chains. One example of a variation of the TLC match is the Tables, Ladders, Chairs, and Canes match. This match is a TLC match with the addition of Singapore Canes. The first and only TLC match was at Guilty as Charged on January 7, 2001 at the Hammerstein Ballroom in New York, New York, involving Steve Corino, Justin Credible, and The Sandman.

==== Tables and Ladders/Tables, Ladders, Chairs and Canes matches ====
No.	Match	Stipulations	Event	Date	Location	Length
1	The Eliminators (Perry Saturn and John Kronus) (c) defeated Sabu and Rob Van Dam	Tag team Tables & Ladders match for the ECW World Tag Team Championship	CyberSlam	February 22, 1997	Philadelphia, Pennsylvania	20:40
2	Sabu defeated The Sandman	Tables & Ladders match	November to Remember	November 30, 1997	Philadelphia, Pennsylvania	20:55
3	The Sandman defeated Steve Corino (c) and Justin Credible	Three-way Tables, Ladders, Chairs, & Canes match for the ECW World Heavyweight Championship	Guilty as Charged	January 7, 2001	New York, New York	13:20

=== TNA Wrestling ===
TNA Wrestling (TNA) – known as Impact Wrestling from 2017 to 2024 – promotes their own modified version of the TLC match called Full Metal Mayhem.

The inaugural Full Metal Mayhem match featured Jeff Hardy vs. Abyss at Against All Odds 2005. Abyss defeated Hardy by climbing the ladder to retrieve a contract for a shot at the NWA World Heavyweight Championship on a future episode of TNA Impact!.

There have been 19 Full Metal Mayhem matches held in TNA.

==== Full Metal Mayhem matches ====
No.	Match	Stipulations	Event	Date	Location	Length
1	Abyss defeated Jeff Hardy	Full Metal Mayhem match for a shot at the NWA World Heavyweight Championship on a future episode of TNA Impact!.	Against All Odds	February 13, 2005	Orlando, Florida	15:21
2	Christian Cage (c) defeated Abyss	Full Metal Mayhem match for the NWA World Heavyweight Championship.	Sacrifice	May 14, 2006	Orlando, Florida	26:01
3	Team 3D (Brother Ray & Brother Devon) and Kurt Angle defeated Christian Cage, Rhino and A.J. Styles	Six-man tag team Full Metal Mayhem match.	Victory Road	July 13, 2008	Houston, Texas	15:55
4	The British Invasion (Brutus Magnus & Doug Williams; IWGP) and Team 3D (Brother Ray & Brother Devon) defeated The Main Event Mafia (Booker T & Scott Steiner; TNA World) and Beer Money, Inc. (James Storm & Bobby Roode)	Four team Full Metal Mayhem match for the TNA World Tag Team Championship and the IWGP World Tag Team Championship.	Bound for Glory	October 18, 2009	Irvine, California	17:13
5	The Motor City Machine Guns (Alex Shelley & Chris Sabin) (c) defeated Generation Me (Max Buck & Jeremy Buck)	Tag team Full Metal Mayhem match for the TNA World Tag Team Championship.	Final Resolution	December 5, 2010	Orlando, Florida	16:27
6	Rob Van Dam defeated Jerry Lynn	Full Metal Mayhem match.	Bound for Glory	October 16, 2011	Philadelphia, Pennsylvania	13:14
7	Bully Ray (c) defeated Jeff Hardy	Full Metal Mayhem match for the TNA World Heavyweight Championship.	Impact Wrestling	April 11, 2013	Corpus Christi, Texas	17:10
8	Jeff Hardy defeated Chris Sabin	Full Metal Mayhem match as a part of the TNA World Heavyweight Championship Qualification Tournament.	Impact Wrestling	November 7, 2013	Cincinnati, Ohio	10:38
9	Joseph Park and Eric Young defeated Bad Influence (Christopher Daniels & Kazarian)	Full Metal Mayhem match	One Night Only: Hardcore Justice 3	January 10, 2014	Lowell, Massachusetts	13:37
10	The Wolves (Davey Richards & Eddie Edwards) (c) defeated Team 3D (Bully Ray & Devon) and The Hardys (Matt Hardy & Jeff Hardy)	Full Metal Mayhem match for the TNA World Tag Team Championship.	Impact Wrestling	October 8, 2014	Bethlehem, Pennsylvania	27:03
10	Dirty Heels (Bobby Roode & Austin Aries) defeated The Wolves (Davey Richards & Eddie Edwards)	Full Metal Mayhem match in match four of Best of Five Series.	Impact Wrestling	June 24, 2015	Orlando, Florida	20:06
11	Ethan Carter III (c) defeated Matt Hardy	Full Metal Mayhem match for the TNA World Heavyweight Championship.	No Surrender	August 5, 2015	Orlando, Florida	21:02
12	Jeff Hardy defeated Matt Hardy	Full Metal Mayhem match	Slammiversary	June 12, 2016	Orlando, Florida	17:08
13	Eddie Edwards and Alisha Edwards defeated Davey Richards and Angelina Love	Mixed tag team Full Metal Mayhem match	Slammiversary XV	July 2, 2017	Orlando, Florida	08:30
14	The Latin American Xchange (Santana and Ortiz) defeated The Lucha Bros (Fénix and Pentagón Jr.) (c)	Full Metal Mayhem match for the Impact World Tag Team Championship.	Rebellion	April 28, 2019	Toronto, Ontario	20:30
15	Rosemary defeated Havok	Full Metal Mayhem match	Rebellion Night 2	April 28, 2020	Nashville, Tennessee	12:26
16	Moose (c) defeated Eddie Edwards	Full Metal Mayhem match for the Impact World Championship	Turning Point	November 20, 2021	Sunrise Manor, Nevada	31:34
17	Josh Alexander (c) defeated Bully Ray	Full Metal Mayhem match for the Impact World Championship	Hard To Kill	January 13, 2023	Atlanta, Georgia	17:00
18	Frankie Kazarian defeated Eric Young	Full Metal Mayhem match	Rebellion	April 20, 2024	Paradise, Nevada	15:20
19	The Hardys (Matt Hardy and Jeff Hardy) defeated The System (Brian Myers and Eddie Edwards) (c) and ABC (Ace Austin and Chris Bey)	Three-way Full Metal Mayhem match for the TNA World Tag Team Championship	Bound for Glory	October 26, 2024	Detroit, Michigan	27:25

=== Lucha Libre AAA Worldwide ===
==== Tables, Ladders and Chairs matches ====
No.	Match	Stipulations	Event	Date	Location	Length
1	Octagóncito defeated Mini Abismo Negro (c), Mini Charly Manson, Mascarita Divina, Mini Psicosis, Mini Histeria, Mascarita Sagrada, La Parkita and Mini Chessman	Tag team Tables & Ladders match for the AAA World Mini-Estrellas Championship	Triplemanía XVIII	June 6, 2010	Mexico City, Mexico	09:05
2	Electroshock, Heavy Metal (with Charly Montana, Lokillo and Nanyzh Rock) and Joe Líder defeated La Maniarquía (Chessman, Silver Cain and Último Gladiador) (with Jennifer Blake and Maniaquito)	Tables & Ladders match	Triplemanía XIX	June 18, 2011	Mexico City, Mexico	15:42
3	Chessman and Averno defeated Los Perros del Mal (Daga and Joe Líder), and Australian Suicide and Argenis	Triple threat tag team Tables & Ladders match for the AAA World Tag Team Championship	Rey de Reyes (2016)	March 23, 2016	San Luis Potosí, Mexico	Unknown
4	Johnny Mundo (c) defeated Hijo del Fantasma and Texano Jr	Three-way Tables, Ladders and Chairs match for the AAA Mega Championship, AAA Latin American Championship and AAA World Cruiserweight Championship	Triplemanía XXV	August 26, 2017	Mexico City, Mexico	22:04
5	Nuevo Poder del Norte (Carta Brava Jr., Soul Rocker and Mocho Cota Jr.) vs. Los OGT (Chessman, Averno and Super Fly)	Tables & Ladders match for the AAA World Trios Championship	Rey de Reyes (2018)	March 4, 2018	Puebla, Mexico	TBA
6	Tessa Blanchard defeated Ayako Hamada, Chik Tormenta, Faby Apache, La Hiedra, Lady Shani and Taya	Seven-woman Tables & Ladders match for the vacant AAA Reina de Reinas Championship	Triplemanía XXVII	August 3, 2019	Mexico City, Mexico	10:32

== See also ==
- Ladder match
- WWE TLC: Tables, Ladders & Chairs
- Steel cage match
