= Konan Big =

Mexican professional wrestler

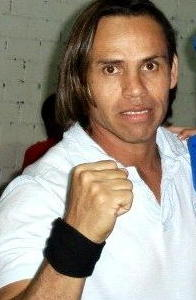
- Konan Big posing

Personal information
- Born: Eugenio Torres Villarreal; July 13, 1964 (age 62) Monterrey, Nuevo Leon, Mexico

Professional wrestling career
- Ring name(s): Konan Big; Konan Plus
- Billed height: 1.85 m (6 ft 1 in)
- Billed weight: 91 kg (201 lb)
- Trained by: Mr. Lince
- Debut: 2004

Eugenio Torres Villarreal (born July 13, 1964) is a Mexican professional wrestler, television host, singer and comedian best known under his ring name Konan Big. Torres competes primarily in the Monterrey-based Federación Internacional de Lucha Libre (FILL)) and in the Independent circuit in northern Mexico. He is known mainly in Monterrey for professional wrestling against various celebrities. He also appears occasionally on the variety show Es Show (formerly "Las Noches del Futbol") on Multimedios Televisión.

== Professional wrestling career ==
=== Independent circuit ===
Torres made his professional wrestling debut in early 2004 working for the Monterrey-based professional wrestling promotion ''Federación Internacional de Lucha Libre (Spanish for "International Wrestling Federation"; FILL) using the ring name Konan Big. Within a month of his debut Konan Big had already won the mask of "Latin Heart" when he defeated him in a Luchas de Apuesta (bet match). On February 22, 2004 Konan Big lost his own mask when he was defeated in an Apuesta match by a local wrestler named Spiderman.

Not long after his unmasking Konan Big became involved in a storyline feud with Patricio "Pato" Zambrano, a television host and reality star, the storyline was that television actress Irma Serrano hired Konan Big to humiliate Pato Zambrano by shaving his hair off. The plan backfired as Pato Zambrano defeated Konan Big in a Luchas de Apuesta match on August 1, 2004.

In the following years Konan Big would wrestle against other Multimedios personalities such as male model Alfonso de Nigris, Regalito the Clown, and Acábatelo host Mario Bezares. In 2006 he also gained a measure of revenge on Pato Zambrano when he shaved Zambrano's hair off after defeating him in an Apuesta match.

In 2005 Konan Big won his first championship, the FILL World Heavyweight Championship. Konan Big held the title throughout 2005 and 2006, briefly losing the title to Konnan and then regaining it. In December 2006 Konan Big lost the title for the second and final time to Rayo de Jalisco, Jr.

In 2007 Konan Big defeated Axel El Nieto del Santo ("The Grandson of Santo) to win the FILL World Middleweight Championship. On March 11, 2007 Konan Big and Axel lost a tag team match to El Hijo del Aníbal and El Hijo del Solitario, after which the two faced off in a match where Konan Big put the Middleweight title on the line and Axel put his mask on the line. On the night Axel managed to keep his mask and defeated Konan Big for the Middleweight title.

Konan Big would continue to wrestle local celebrities, losing to Regalito and Raton the Clown in a handicap match and wrestling against radio DJ Cepi Boy, Torin and Gongora. Konan Big claims to have made a backstage appearance during Total Nonstop Action Wrestling's (TNA) 2007 Genesis Pay-Per-View laying out an open challenge to everyone in TNA. This appearance apparently was his only appearance for TNA so far, But this information has no background nor proof.

Konan Big took several months off in 2008 to write and produce his own rap CD, returning to the ring in April, 2008. On October 31, 2008 Konan Big lost a non-title match to the NWA World Heavyweight Champion Blue Demon, Jr. in the main event of a Halloween show in Monterrey.

In 2015, Konan Big suffered an injury, while wrestling in Monclova.

=== AAA / Lucha Libre AAA Worldwide ===
Over the years Konan Big has made several appearances for AAA when their tour went through Monterrey. On June 9, 2009 Konan Big faced Cibernético in a match where Cibernético stated before the match that Konan Big was used to facing "clowns and TV presenters" (the latter referring to his various conflicts with Ernesto Chavana, the host of Las Noches de Futbol) but now had to face a real wrestler. The statement was backed up with a victory over Konan Big after only just eight minutes.

At AAA's annual Heroes Inmortales III Konan Big made his first mainstream appearance for AAA, first being brought out as one of the potential opponents for Chessman after his scheduled opponent Charly Manson left the promotion. Later on he participated in the third annual Copa Antonio Peña, being the last wrestler eliminated by Cibernético.

So far Konan Big has only wrestled one match for AAA since then, teaming with Latin Lover and X-Pac to defeat Konnan, Kenzo Suzuki and Nicho el Millonario.

On September 11, 2011, it was announced that Konan Big would be returning to AAA on October 9 at Héroes Inmortales, where he would accompany El Hijo del Perro Aguayo to the ring for his match against Dr. Wagner, Jr. for the AAA Latin American Championship. Two days after the announcement Torres revealed that he was planning to retire from professional wrestling at the end of 2011. At Héroes Inmortales, Konan Big failed in his attempt to help Aguayo defeat Wagner, Jr. for his title.

== Television and Musical career ==
Since the mid-2000s Konan Big has been making frequent appearances as a host on Es Show a TV show on Multimedios network.

In 2008 Konan Big announced that he was working on a rap cd named Y Miren Lo Que Traigo Raza ("And look at what I bring, fam") that was released later in 2008. Also in 2008 Konan Big and Grupo Palomo performed as opening acts in a Joan Sebastian concert at the Arena Monterrey.

In 2009 he announced that he would change his rap name to "Buffalo" due to copyright problems.

In 2011 Konan released two singles Watifor and La Troca.

In 2019, Konan made his debut as a Stand-up comedian.

== Championships and accomplishments ==
- Federación Internacional de Lucha Libre
  - FILL Heavyweight Championship (2 times)
  - FILL Light Heavyweight Championship (1 time)
  - FILL Middleweight Championship (1 time)

== Luchas de Apuestas record ==
Winner (wager)	Loser (wager)	Location	Event	Date	Notes
Konan Big (mask)	Latin Heart (mask)	Monterrey, Nuevo León	Live event	January 18, 2004	
Spiderman (mask)	Konan Big (mask)	Monterrey, Nuevo León	Live event	February 22, 2004	
Pato Zambrano (hair)	Konan Big (hair)	Monterrey, Nuevo León	Live event	August 1, 2004	(Note: Zambrano is not a wrestler and Konan Big never had his hair cut after the match.)
Konan Big (hair)	Super Konnan (mask)	Monterrey, Nuevo León	Live event	March 2006	(Note: Three-way match that also included Pancho Tequila.)
Konan Big (hair)	Pato Zambrano (hair)	Monterrey, Nuevo León	Live event	September 12, 2006	(Note: Triangle match that also include Diluvio Negro I.)
Konan Big (hair)	Carola (hair)	Monterrey, Nuevo León	Live event	October 3, 2006	
Konan Big (hair)	El Cachichurris (hair)	Monterrey, Nuevo León	Live event	April 23, 2007	
Konan Big (hair)	Sky (hair)	Monterrey, Nuevo León	Live event	May 15, 2007	
Konan Big (hair)	Simbolo (hair)	Monterrey, Nuevo León	Live event	July 31, 2011	
Konan Big (hair)	Big Neurosis (hair)	Monterrey, Nuevo León	Live event	April 29, 2012	
Ernesto Chavana (hair)	Konan Big (hair)	Monterrey, Nuevo León	Live event	July 14, 2013	(Note: Chavana is the host of Las Noches de Futbol and not a professional wrestler.)
