= AAA World Mini-Estrella Championship =

Professional wrestling championship

Details
- Promotion: Lucha Libre AAA Worldwide (AAA)
- Date established: September 14, 2008
- Date retired: November 5, 2022
Statistics
- First champion: Mini Charly Manson
- Final champion: Dinastía
- Most reigns: Dinastía (2 reigns)
- Longest reign: Dinastía (1,558 days)
- Shortest reign: Mini Abismo Negro (177 days)
- Oldest champion: Mini Psicosis (44 years, 334 days)
- Youngest champion: Mini Charly Manson (21 years, 67 days)
- Heaviest champion: Mini Abismo Negro; 75 kg (160 lbs)
- Lightest champion: Octagoncito; 62 kg (137 lbs)

The AAA World Mini-Estrella Championship (Campeonato Mundial Mini AAA in Spanish) was a professional wrestling championship promoted by the Mexican Lucha Libre promotion Lucha Libre AAA Worldwide (AAA). The championship was exclusively competed for in the Mini-Estrellas, or Minis, division. A "Mini" was not necessarily a person with dwarfism like North American Midget wrestling, it can also be very short wrestlers who works in the Mini division. The Championship was created in 2008 after Mascarita Sagrada left AAA, taking the Mexican National Mini-Estrella Championship with him, leaving AAA without a title for their Mini-Estrellas division. Being a professional wrestling championship it was not won legitimately; it was instead won via a scripted ending to a match.

== History ==
The AAA World Mini-Estrella Championship was created in 2008 as the focal point of AAA's Mini-Estrellas division. The first champion was Mini Charly Manson who won a Mini-Estrella Championship tournament when he defeated Mini Abismo Negro and Octagoncito in the finals of the tournament that took place at the 2008 Verano de Escándalo show on September 14, 2008. Mini Charly Manson did not defend the title for over a year, mainly due to suffering two separate injuries that put him on the disabled list for most of the year.

The inaugural champion was Mini Charly Manson, who defeated Mini Abismo Negro and Octagoncito at Verano de Escándalo on September 14, 2008 in Zapopan, Jalisco. The longest reigning champion was Dinastia, who held the title for 1,558 days from February 18, 2013 to May 26, 2017. The youngest champion was Mini Charly Manson, who won at the age of 21 years and 67 days. The shortest reigning champion was Mini Abismo Negro who held the title for 177 days from December 11, 2009 to June 6, 2010. The oldest champion is Mini Psicosis who won at the age of 44 years and 334 days.

=== Inaugural championship tournament ===
The tournament to crown the first ever AAA World Mini-Estrellas champion ran from July 20, 2008 until September 14, 2008 with the finals at the 2008 Verano de Escándalo event. The tournament featured 12 wrestlers who wrestled in regular singles matches until the final which was a three-way match.

Tournament bracket

1st Round
Sin Limite (July 25, 2008)
Atomic Boy	Win
Mascarita de la Muerte	2:48
Sin Limite (July 20, 2008)
La Parkita	3:13
Mini Abismo Negro	Win
Sin Limite (July 20, 2008)
Mascarita Sagrada	Win
Mini Histeria	2:43
Sin Limite (July 31, 2008)
Jerrito Estrada	3:00
Mini Charly Manson	Win
Sin Limite (August 8, 2008)
Mascarita Divina	2:40
Mini Kenzo Suzuki	Win
Sin Limite (July 25, 2008)
Mini Chessman	3:40
Octagóncito	Win

Semifinals
Sin Limite (August 31, 2008)
Atomic Boy	—
Mini Abismo Negro	Win
Sin Limite (August 17, 2008)
Mascarita Sagrada	4:52
Mini Charly Manson	Win
Sin Limite (August 15, 2008)
Mini Kenzo Suzuki	4:08
Octagóncito	Win

Final
Sin Limite: Verano de Escándalo (September 14, 2008)
Mini Abismo Negro	13:06
Mini Charly Manson	Win (Note: This was a three-way elimination match. Order of elimination: Octagóncito, Mini Abismo Negro)
Octagóncito	—

== Reigns ==
Key
No.	Overall reign number
Reign	Reign number for the specific champion
Days	Number of days held
+	Current reign is changing daily

No.	Champion	Championship change			Reign statistics		Notes	Ref.
No.	Champion	Date	Event	Location	Reign	Days	Notes	Ref.
Lucha Libre AAA Worldwide (AAA)
1	Mini Charly Manson	September 14, 2008	Verano de Escándalo	Zapopan, Jalisco	1	453	Manson defeated Mini Abismo Negro and Octagóncito in the final of a 12-man tournament to become the inaugural champion. This episode aired on tape delay on September 21, 2008.	
2	Mini Abismo Negro	December 11, 2009	Guerra de Titanes	Ciudad Madero, Tamaulipas	1	177	Negro defeated La Parkita, Mascarita Divina, Mascarita Sagrada, Mini Charly Manson, Mini Chessman, Mini Histeria, Mini Psicosis, and Octagoncito in a 9-man Battle Royal to win the championship. This episode aired on tape delay on December 20, 2009.	
3	Octagoncito	June 6, 2010	Triplemanía XVIII	Mexico City, Mexico	1	325	This was a 12-man Tables, Ladders, and Chairs match, also involving La Parkita, Mascarita Divina, Mascarita Sagrada, Mini Charly Manson, Mini Chessman, Mini Histeria and Mini Psicosis.	
4	Mini Psicosis	April 27, 2011	Sin Límite	Zacapoaxtla, Puebla	1	663	This episode aired on tape delay on May 8, 2011.	
5	Dinastía	February 18, 2013	Sin Límite	Irapuato, Guanajuato	1	1,558	This episode aired on tape delay on March 9, 2013.	
6	Mini Psycho Clown	May 26, 2017	AAA Worldwide	Mexico City, Mexico	1	659		
7	Dinastía	March 16, 2019	AAA Vive Latino house show	Mexico City, Mexico	2	1,330	Dinastía defeated Mini Psycho Clown, Mini Monster Clown, Mini Murder Clown, La Parkita, and La Parkita Negra.	
—	Vacated	November 5, 2022	—	—	—	—	Dinastía vacated the title after leaving AAA.	
—	Deactivated	November 5, 2022	—	—	—	—	The championship was abandoned.	

== Combined reigns ==
Rank	Wrestler	No. of reigns	Combined days
1	Dinastía	2	2,888
2	Mini Psicosis	1	663
3	Mini Psycho Clown	1	659
4	Mini Charly Manson	1	453
5	Octagoncito	1	325
6	Mini Abismo Negro	1	177
