= La Parkita (AAA) =

Mexican professional wrestler

Professional wrestling career
- Ring name: La Parkita
- Trained by: Espectrito; Sangre Nueva
- Debut: 1991

La Parkita is a Mexican professional wrestler, who works in the Mini-Estrella division for Lucha Libre AAA World Wide (AAA). He is the third wrestler to compete as La Parkita and is at times denoted as "La Parkita III" or "La Parkita (AAA)". La Parkita's real name is not a matter of public record, as is often the case with masked wrestlers in Mexico where their private lives are kept a secret from the wrestling fans. Working in the Mini division does not automatically mean that he has dwarfism as several short wrestlers work in the "Mini" division.

== Professional wrestling career ==
The wrestler known as La Parkita in Lucha Libre AAA World Wide (AAA) reportedly made his professional wrestling debut in 1991, although it has not been revealed which ring name he worked under prior to 1997, it has not even been confirmed if he worked as a Mini-Estrella before 1997 or not. In 1997 AAA owner Antonio Peña chose him to become the third incarnation of La Parkita, with the previous La Parkita being repackaged as the new version of Octagoncito.

The third La Parkita made his first appearance at a major AAA show on March 1, 1998 when he appeared at the 1998 Rey de Reyes teaming with Mini Discovery and Octagoncito in a loss to Mini Abismo Negro, Mini Electroshock and Mini Psicosis At the 2000 Rey de Reyes La Parkita, Octagoncito and Mascarita Sagrada 2000 defeated Mini Abismo Negro, Mini Psicosis and Rocky Marvin The team of La Parkita and Octagoncito became the top tecnico (good guy) team of AAA's Mini-Estrellas division. At Triplemania IX they teamed up with Mascarita Sagrada to defeat Espectrito, Mini Abismo Negro, and Rocky Marvin. Three months later the team defeated Mini Psicosis, Mini Abismo Negro and Rocky Marvin on the undercard of Verano de Escandalo. At Triplemanía XIV La Parkita, Mascarita Sagrada, and Octagóncito defeated Jerrito Estrada, Mini Abismo Negro, and Mini Chessman when Octagóncito pinned Jerrito Estrada, Mascarita Sagrada pinned Mini Abismo Negro, and La Parkita pinned Mini Chessman at the same time.

In the summer of 2008 AAA decided to create the AAA World Mini-Estrellas Championship after the reigning Mexican National Mini-Estrellas Champion Mascarita Sagrada left AAA, taking the championship belt with him. On July 20, 2009 La Parkita was defeated by Mini Abismo Negro in the opening round of the Mini-Estrella championship tournament. On December 11, 2009 La Parkita was one of nine wrestlers who participated in a Battle Royal for the AAA World Minis title at Guerra de Titanes (2009). Parkita was the fourth man eliminated, ousted by eventual match and championship winner Mini Abismo Negro. La Parkita was not originally scheduled for the Triplemanía XVIII Mini-Estrellas match but was added to the Tables, Ladders and Chairs match for the AAA Minis Championship. La Parkita did not win the match, although he was responsible for eliminating the then champion Mini Charly Manson from the match. The match was eventually won the Octagoncito.

== Not to be confused with ==
The current La Parkita is the third wrestler to play the role for an extended period of time. Since the character wears a mask and a full body suit there is no way of confirming if other wrestlers have played the part of La Parkita from time to time. There are three distinct La Parka characters:

1. Alberto Jiménez – The original La Parkita. Used the character after he left AAA as well. Was killed in 2009
2. La Parkita II – The wrestler that took over after Alberto Jiménez, currently wrestles as the second version of Octagoncito.
3. La Parkita III – The current version
4. Mini Park – A Mini based on L.A. Park (the original La Parka)

== Championships and accomplishments ==
- Mexican independent circuit
  - San Juan Pantitlan Mini-Estrellas Championship (1 time)
