= Mini Psycho Clown =

Mexican professional wrestler

Personal information
- Born: January 30, 1985 (age 41) Mexico City, Mexico

Professional wrestling career
- Ring name(s): Mini Psycho Clown; Mascarita de la Muerte
- Trained by: Bala de Plata; Carta Brava; Dios de Plata; Tom Mix Jr. Villano IV
- Debut: December 12, 2001

Mini Psycho Clown (born January 30, 1985) is the ring name of a Mexican professional wrestler signed to Lucha Libre AAA Worldwide (AAA) in the Mini-Estrella division. He is a former AAA World Mini-Estrella Champion. Mini Psycho Clown's real name is not a matter of public record, as is often the case with masked wrestlers in Mexico where their private lives are kept a secret from the wrestling fans. He is a member of Mini Psycho Circus, three smaller versions of Los Psycho Circus. He previously appeared as Mascarita de la Muerte, where he had a storyline rivalry with the técnico (good guy) Mini-Estrella variously known as Mini Dizzy and Atomic Boy.

== Championships and accomplishments ==
- Lucha Libre AAA Worldwide
  - AAA World Mini-Estrella Championship (1 time)
