= Triplemanía IV-C =

1996 Lucha Libre AAA World Wide event

- Official poster
- Promotion: AAA
- Date: July 15, 1996
- City: Madero, Tamaulipas, Mexico
- Venue: Convention Center
- Attendance: 12,000

Pay-per-view chronology
← Previous; Triplemanía IV-B	Next → Rey de Reyes

Triplemanía chronology
← Previous; IV-B	Next → V-A

Triplemanía IV-C was a major professional wrestling, show promoted by the Mexican-based AAA and was the third and final of three Triplemanía IV shows held in 1996. The event took place on July 15, 1996 at the Madero Convention center in Ciudad Madero, Tamaulipas, Mexico. The annual Triplemanía show(s) are AAA's biggest show of the year, serving as the culmination of major storylines and feature wrestlers from all over the world competing in what has been described as AAA's version of WrestleMania or their Super Bowl event.

The Main event featured a Steel Cage Match Lucha de Apuestas "Mask vs. Mask" match where the last man in the cage was forced to unmask. The teams facing off were Los Junior Atomicos (Máscara Sagrada Jr., Tinieblas Jr., Blue Demon Jr., and Halcón Dorado Jr.) and the team of Karis la Momia and Los Payasos (Coco Rojo, Coco Verde and Coco Amarillo). The show also featured a rematch of sorts from Triplemanía IV-B, featuring the winner Pierroth Jr. and the last man eliminated, Konnan, from the AAA Campeón de Campeones Championship match. Earlier in the show two of AAA's top young wrestlers, Rey Misterio Jr. and Juventud Guerrera wrestled in a match where both men put their brand new cars on the line.

== Production ==
=== Background ===
Just like in 1994 and 1995 AAA planned out three Triplemanía events in 1994, the first Triplemanía IV show slated for May 11, the second Triplemanía IV show was booked for June 15 in Orizaba, Veracruz and the third Triplemanía IV would take place on July 15 in Madero, Tamaulipas. Triplemanía IV-C was the tenth overall show produced under the Triplemanía banner.

=== Storylines ===
The Triplemanía show featured eight professional wrestling matches with different wrestlers involved in pre-existing scripted feuds, plots and storylines. Wrestlers were portrayed as either heels (referred to as rudos in Mexico, those that portray the "bad guys") or faces (técnicos in Mexico, the "good guy" characters) as they followed a series of tension-building events, which culminated in a wrestling match or series of matches.

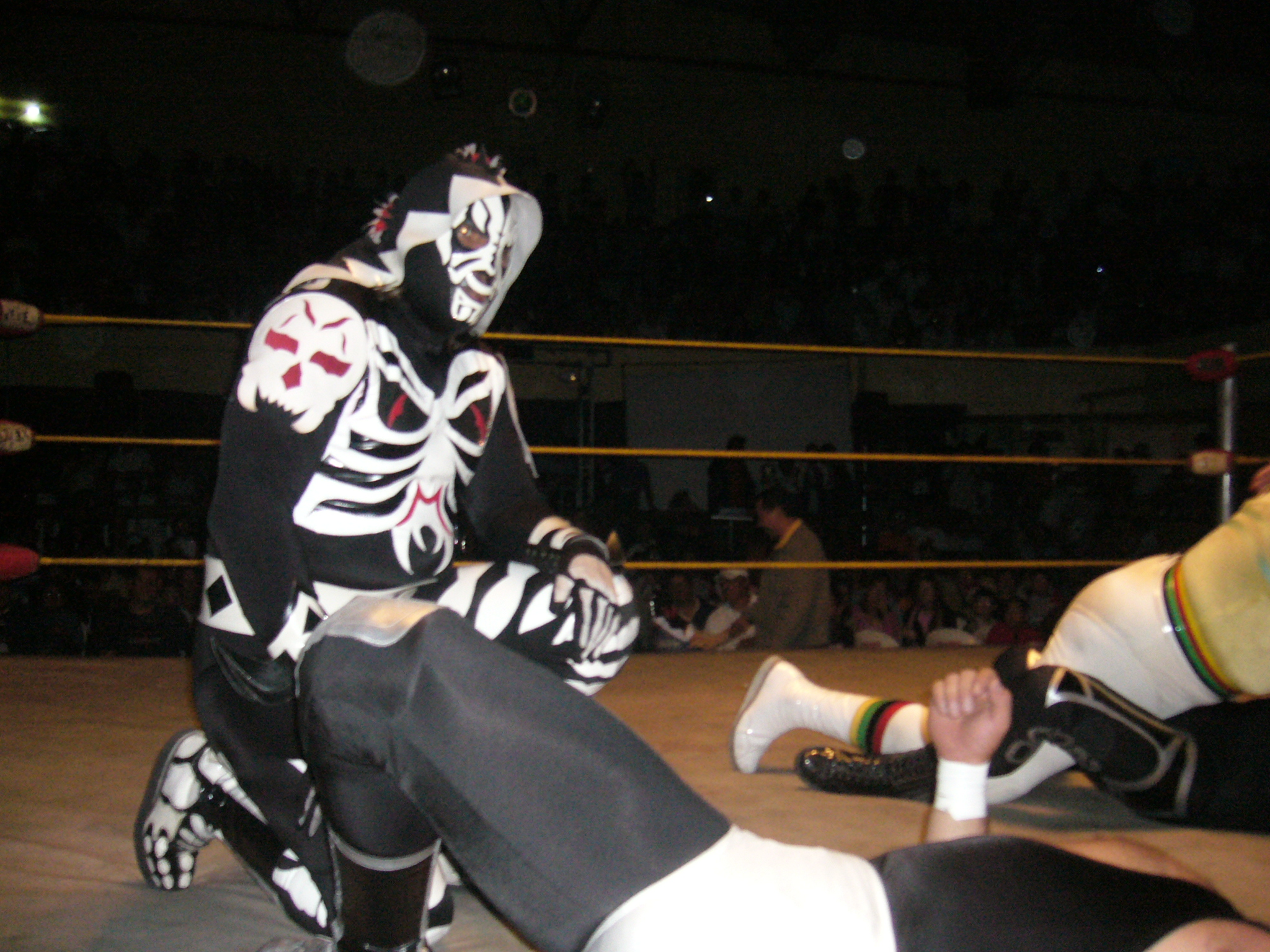
La Parka, who teamed up with Winners, Super Caló and El Mexicano in the fourth match of the night.

In late 1995 tecnico Halcón Dorado Jr. came to AAA from the UWA as it was closing its doors. In AAA he quickly found himself partnered up with a number of other "Juniors", Blue Demon Jr., Máscara Sagrada Jr. and Tinieblas Jr. to form a group that became known as Los Junior Atómicos. Of the four only two of them were actually sons of the wrestlers they took the name of, Tinieblas Jr. (son of Tinieblas) and Blue Demon Jr. (Son of Blue Demon). The remaining two were billed more as "successors" and not actually children of Máscara Sagrada and Halcón Dorado. During a tag team match earlier in 1996 a Blue Demon Jr. dive onto Karis La Momia ("Karis the Mummy") ended badly, with the storyline being that the dive injured Karis, causing him to grab a char and attack Blue Demon Jr. during the match. The storyline soon saw Karis la Momoa recruit Los Payasos ("The Clowns"; Coco Rojo, Coco Verde and Coco Amarillo) a trio of "Evil clowns". which brought out Blue Demon Jr.'s fellow Junior Atómicos to even the odds. On May 15, 2015 Karis defeated Blue Demon Jr. to win the Mexican National Cruiserweight Championship during a show Naucalpan, Mexico State. At Triplemanía IV-B the two sides met in a regular eight-man "Atómicos" tag team elimination match where Los Junior Atómicos won by disqualification. Subsequently all eight wrestlers agreed to put their masks on the line in a steel cage match, where each competitor would have to climb out of the cage in order to keep their mask safe, with the last man remaining in the cage being forced to unmask under Lucha de Apuestas, or "bet match" rules.

Rey Misterio Jr. and Juventud Guerrera's early careers in AAA had been intertwined for several years by the time Triplemanía IV-C came around, with the two young wrestlers having faced off repeatedly inside and outside of Mexico. At Triplemanía II-B, Juventud Guerrera, his father Fuerza Guerrera and Misterioso defeated Rey Misterio Jr., his uncle Rey Misterio and Volador in their first major show encounter. On November 30, 1994 Rey Misterio Jr. defeated Juventud Guerrera to win the WWA World Lightweight Championship on an AAA show in Matamoros, Tamaulipas. Three months later, on February 2, 1995 Rey Misterio and Rey Misterio Jr. successfully defended the WWA World Tag Team Championship against Fuerza and Juventud Guerrera. A month later the Guerreras would win the WWA Tag Team Championship when Juventud Guerrera pinned Rey Misterio Jr. By pinning Misterio Jr. Juventud Guerrera also regained the WWA World Lightweight Championship. On June 16, 1995 Rey Misterio Jr. regained the WWA World Lightweight Championship. On January 31, 1996 both Rey Misterio Jr. and Juventud Guerrera would place their personal cars on the line in a steel cage match, but during the match both wrestlers ended up stumbling off the top of the cage, landing on the top bar of the cage, unable to continue the match which was declared a draw. In the early summer it was announced that the two would face once more and once again both wrestlers would "bet" their brand new car on the outcome of the match at Triplemanía IV-C.

== Event ==
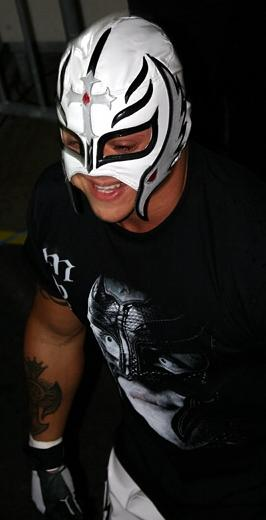
Rey Misterio Jr., won ownership of Juventud Guerrera's car

For the match between Rey Misterio Jr. and Juventud Guerrera Rey Misterio Jr. was accompanied by Super Caló while Guerera had Mosco de la Merced in his corner. The match quickly went out of control with the referee not counting when the two fought on the floor, treating the match as a no-disqualification match. After a long match where neither man could gain a decisive advantage Pierroth Jr. came to ringside and helped Guerrera and Mosco de la Merced attack Rey Misterio Jr. Mosco and Pierroth Jr. tired Misterio Jr.'s hands, making him helpless to block Guerrera's attack with a Kendo stick. After a couple of blows with the Kendo stick the masked rudo known as The Killer came to the ring to help out. An exhausted Juventud Guerrera gave Killer the Kendo Stick, but instead of hitting Rey Misterio Jr., the Killer turned to Guerrera and hit him over the head with the Kendo Stick several times, then pulled off his mask to reveal that it was actually Konnan under the mask. After chasing off both Pierroth Jr. and Mosoco, Rey Misterio Jr. was finally able to roll up Juventud Guerrera for the pinfall victory. With the victory the storyline was that Misterio Jr. now owned Juventud Guerrera's car.

The confrontation between Konnan and Pierroth Jr. was just a preview for their match later that night, in the semi-final position of the show. The two faced off in a Dog collar match, which meant that the two were joined together by a long steel chain that was connected to a dog collar around the neck of each competitor. The collar was then locked to prevent one of the wrestlers from getting out of the collar during the match. At some point Pierroth Jr. either stole the key from the referee, or had a spare key hidden somewhere as he was able to take off his collar, use the freedom of movement to tie up Konnan and hit him repeatedly with the steel chain. With Konnan down Pierroth Jr. was able to touch the top turnbuckle on all four corners, which was how the match was won.

In the main event cage match wrestlers could escape the cage and thus unmasking only by climbing over the top of the cage and all the way to the floor. The first escapee was Coco Amarillo, who climbed over the top within minutes of the opening bell. When Máscara Sagrada Jr. tried to escape the Killer, the real one this time, climbed up the cage from the outside and pushed Máscara Sagrada Jr. off the top of the cage, back inside the ring. A few minutes later Coco Azul was able to leave the cage as well, leaving his two partners at a four-on-two disadvantage in the cage. During the match Máscara Sagrada tried to even the sides as he tried to prevent the Killer from interfering on several occasions. When Tinieblas Jr. climbed the cage the Killer tried to stop him as he had done before, but this time Tinieblas Jr. was able to knock Killer down and become the third man to leave the cage, moments later Máscara Sagrada Jr. also left the cage. At this point Lady Victoria, who was siding with Los Payasos and Karis locked Miss Janeth to the cage with a pair of handcuffs. Blue Demon Jr. managed to kick a chair into the face of Karis La Momia and then use the break in the action to climb over the top of the cage to the floor. When the match came down to Karis La Momia and Halcón Dorado Jr. Máscarita Sagráda Jr. ran to ringside to help his regular-sized friends out, helping unlock the handcuffs used on Miss Janeth. Looking to help out the diminutive Mini-Estrella climbed up the outside of the cage and dove off the top. He intended to hit Karis La Momia, but at the last moment Karis moved and Máscarita Sagráda Jr. landed on Halcón Dorado Jr. instead. Karis use the opening to handcuff Máscarita Sagráda Jr. to Halcón Dorado Jr., then began to climb the cage, when Halcón Dorado Jr. tried to stop him he was slowed down by the fact that he was dragging Máscarita Sagráda Jr. behind him, making him too late to stop Karis from leaving the cage. After the match a frustrated Halcón Dorado Jr. revealed that his real name was Antonio Olmos, then angrily pulled his mask off and attacked Máscarita Sagráda Jr. and Máscara Sagráda Jr. blaming them for his mask loss.

== Aftermath ==
With Halcón Dorado Jr.'s unmasking and betrayal the storyline with Karis la Momia and Los Payasos ended. Approximately six months later Los Junior Atómicos introduced a new member, La Parka Jr., who was in fact Karis La Momia under a new mask and identity. Dorado Jr. worked as a rudo, often teaming with Cien Caras over the subsequent months but had left AAA by the end of 1996.

Konnan's loss to Pierroth Jr. turned out to be his last match at a major AAA event for eight years. By the fall of 1996 Konnan and a number of other AAA wrestlers broke away from AAA as they wanted to present shows that were more hardcore wrestling style of show inspired by Extreme Championship Wrestling out of Philadelphia, Pennsylvania, something AAA owner Antonio Peña was not in favor of. Just like Peña had left Consejo Mundial de Lucha Libre with a number of younger wrestlers, very talented leaving with him in 1992 Konnan took a large number of AAA's younger, talented wrestlers with him when he left the company in the fall of 1996.

== Reception ==
In a 2000 article about the history of the Triplemanía up until that point Canadian Online Explorer wrestling writer John Molinario stated that the overall booking of the Triplemanía IV shows was "uninspired and repetitive. Peña recycled old angles that no longer registered with his audience." Wrestling commentator and lucha libre wrestling style expert Mike Tenay noted that "Peña's poor promotional background and track record finally haunted him" stating that at this point AAA no longer had the big name stars to overcome the lack of advertising from AAA's side. Wrestling Observer Newsletter editor Dave Meltzer noted that by 1996 the Triplemanía show became "just a name for a bigger than average house show rather than the first year where it was like a WrestleMania."

== Results ==
No.	Results	Stipulations
1	Cardenal and King Boy defeated Novato I and Acertijo	Tag Team match
2	R-15 and Munrak defeated Lover Boy and Dragon Boy	Tag Team match
3	Máscarita Sagráda Jr., Super Muñequito, and Mini Frisbee defeated La Parkita, Espectrito I and Espectrito II	Six-man "Lucha Libre rules" tag team match
4	La Parka, Winners, Super Caló and El Mexicano defeated Jerry Estrada, Fishman, Villano IV and May Flowers	Eight-man "Atómicos" tag team elimination match
5	Rey Misterio Jr. defeated Juventud Guerrera	"Winner gets the loser's car", Singles match
6	Perro Aguayo, Villano III and Villano IV defeated Octagón, Psicosis and Cibernético by disqualification	Six-man "Lucha Libre rules" tag team match
7	Pierroth Jr. defeated Konnan	Dog collar match
8	Halcón Dorado Jr. lost to Karis la Momia; Also in the match: Los Payasos (Coco Rojo, Coco Verde and Coco Amarillo) and Los Junior Atómicos (Máscara Sagrada Jr., Tinieblas Jr. and Blue Demon Jr.)	Steel Cage Match Lucha de Apuestas, "Mask vs. Mask" match. Halcón Dorado Jr. was the last man in the cage and was forced to unmask
