= La Parka (wrestler, born 1966) =

Mexican professional wrestler (1966–2020)

La Parka (II)
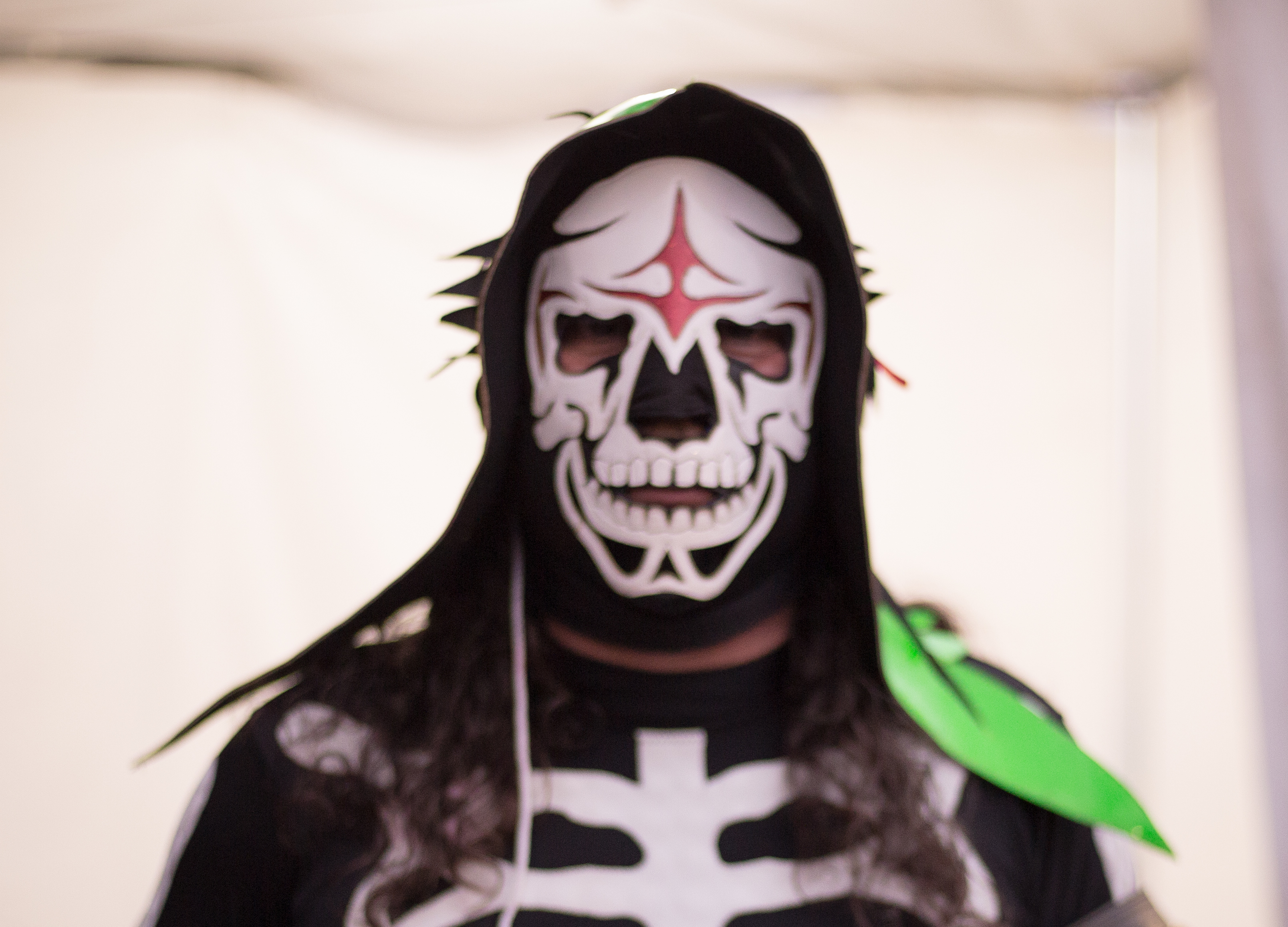
- La Parka (II) in 2019

Personal information
- Born: Jesús Alfonso Huerta Escoboza; January 4, 1966 Hermosillo, Sonora, Mexico
- Died: January 11, 2020 (aged 54) Hermosillo, Sonora, Mexico
- Children: 1

Professional wrestling career
- Ring name(s): Bello Sexy; Crater; Duro; Karis la Momia; La Parka (II); La Parka Jr. Maligno; Santa Esmeralda
- Billed height: 1.84 m (6 ft 1/2 in)
- Billed weight: 101 kg (223 lb)
- Billed from: Hermosillo, Sonora, Mexico
- Trained by: America Salvaje; Resplandor
- Debut: 1987

Jesús Alfonso Huerta Escoboza (January 4, 1966 – January 11, 2020), better known as La Parka, was a Mexican professional wrestler. He worked for the Mexican promotion Lucha Libre AAA Worldwide (AAA) from the mid-1990s until 2019. On January 11, 2020, Huerta died from complications arising from injuries that he sustained from a botched move during an October 2019 match.

Escoboza was not the first professional wrestler to use the ring name "La Parka". Adolfo Tapia was the original La Parka but did not own either the name or the masked character. In the late 1990s, Escoboza was billed as La Parka Jr. and then in 2003 he became the "official" La Parka while Tapia was forced to stop using the name and instead became known as L.A. Park. On March 22, 2025, AAA introduced a third La Parka portrayed by Brazo de Oro Jr. (II).

In 2020, he was posthumously inducted into the AAA Hall of Fame.

== Professional wrestling career ==
=== Early career (1987–1995) ===
Escoboza made his debut in 1987, working as Bello Sexy. Five years later, he changed his gimmick to Maligno (Spanish for "Evil"), which he used until 1995. During this time, he also briefly worked as Crater and Santa Esmarela. He appeared unmasked as security detail for the original Triplemanía.

=== Lucha Libre AAA Worldwide (1995–2019) ===
==== Karis la Momia (1995–1996) ====
In early 1995, Escoboza was once again repackaged when he joined Lucha Libre AAA Worldwide (AAA; then formally known as Asistencia Asesoría y Administración) and became Karis la Momia ("Karis the Mummy"), a mummy gimmick named after the 1940s Mummy-film series Kharis. He was the fourth wrestler to use the Karis la Momia name. On June 30, 1995, Karis la Momia made his first AAA major show appearance, teaming with Espectro I, El Duende, Maniaco and Halloween in a loss to Los Power Raiders at Triplemania III-C. On May 15, 1996, Karis won his first wrestling championship, defeating Blue Demon Jr. for the Mexican National Cruiserweight Championship. At Triplemania IV-A Karis, Arunyo and Killer defeated Blue Demon Jr., El Torero, and Máscara Sagrada Jr. Over the summer of 1996, Karis worked a storyline feud, teaming with Los Payasos against Los Junior Atómicos (Máscara Sagrada Jr., Tinieblas Jr., Blue Demon Jr. and Halcón Dorado Jr.). The two teams met in a four on four match at Triplemania IV-B that Los Junior Atómicos won. The storyline continued at Triplemania IV-C as the two teams faced off in a Steel cage match in the main event. The match saw Karis la Momia defeat Halcón Dorado Jr., forcing him to unmask. In November 1996, Karis la Momia was given a new gimmick and was forced to vacate the Mexican National Cruiserweight Championship because of this. He may have impersonated a new character named La Calaca (a variation of La Parka character with an inverted costume and a more diabolical mask) in a match fought in Arena Neza at the end of 1996. This gimmick was later given to a Monterrey rudo named El Sanguinario.

==== La Parka Jr. (1996–2003) ====
By late 1996, AAA regular, La Parka began working full-time for World Championship Wrestling, which meant that AAA lost one of its most popular performers. Since AAA owner Antonio Peña owned the rights to the character in Mexico, he created "La Parka Jr." as a way to capitalize on the popularity of La Parka, giving the part to the promising Escobedo. La Parka. Jr. joined Los Junior Atómicos, replacing the very man he had unmasked, Halcón Dorado Jr. One of the early appearances of La Parka Jr. was at Guerra de Titanes 1997, where he teamed with Máscara Sagrada Jr., Venum and Cuervo in a loss to Los Vipers (Psicosis, Histeria, Mosco de la Merced and Maniaco). La Parka Jr. quickly became involved in the storyline between the Los Vipers group and a group of "AAA Loyalists", which led to a match at Triplemania VI where he teamed with Latin Lover, Blue Demon Jr. and Máscara Sagráda to defeat Los Vipers (Cibernético, Histeria, Maniaco and Psicosis). On April 4, 1999 Los Junior Atómicos (La Parka Jr. Perro Aguayo Jr., Blue Demon Jr. and Máscara Sagrada Jr.) defeated Los Vatos Locos (Charly Manson, May Flowers, Nygma and Picudo) to win the Mexican National Atómicos Championship. The group held the title for five months, before losing it to rivals Los Vipers at Verano de Escandalo (1999). On August 12, 1999, La Parka Jr. regained the Mexican National Cruiserweight Championship he was forced to give up when he changed gimmicks, defeating Kendo for the title.

On March 30, 2001, La Parka Jr. defeated Latin Lover, Abismo Negro and Heavy Metal to win the 2001 Rey de Reyes tournament, the first visible proof that La Parka Jr. was being positioned as one of the top tecnicos (Face or good guy) of AAA. La Parka Jr. followed his Rey de Reyes success by forcing Abismo Negro to submit in their four-on-four encounter at Triplemania IX on May 26, 2001. On November 11, 2001, La Parka and Máscara Sagrada teamed up to defeat El Texano and Pirata Morgan for the Mexican National Tag Team Championship. The team held the titles until April 19, 2002, when Electroshock and Chessman took the titles from them. La Parka Jr.'s climb up the card continued as he teamed with El Alebrije, Máscara Sagrada and Octagón to defeat Abismo Negro, Cibernético, the Monsther and Leatherface in the main event of Guerra de Titanes 2002. On March 16, 2003, La Parka Jr. won the Rey de Reyes tournament, defeating Abismo Negro to claim his second Rey de Reyes.

==== The new La Parka (2003–2009) ====
In early 2003, the original La Parka joined Consejo Mundial de Lucha Libre (CMLL), AAA's main rival. As a result, Antonio Peña took legal action against Adolfo Tapia, barring him from using the name "La Parka" or wearing the signature "skeleton suit" in Mexico. After taking action against Tapia, La Parka Jr. became known officially as just "La Parka". On June 15, 2003, La Parka main evented his first Triplemanía, teaming with Lizmark, Octagón and Super Caló to defeat Abismo Negro, Cibernético and The Headhunters in the main event of Triplemania XI. Five days later, La Parka teamed with Octagón to win the Mexican National Tag Team Championship from Electroshock and Chessman, a title the team held for 3,110 days.

The storyline between the AAA loyalists, led by La Parka, and Los Vipers, led by Cibernético, came to a head on June 20, 2004, in the main event of Triplemania XII. La Parka defeated Cibernético in a Luchas de Apuesta, forcing Cibernético to unmask in one of the biggest Triplemania events ever. The feud between La Parka and Cibernético continued beyond the mask loss, including La Parka defeating Cibernético in a "Lights Out" match at Verano de Escandalo (2004).

In late 2005, Konnan returned to AAA, bringing a contingent of Total Nonstop Action Wrestling (TNA) wrestlers with him, forming La Legión Extranjera, the new top Rudo (Heel or bad guy) faction of AAA. The appearance of La Legión caused La Parka and Cibernético to form a temporary alliance, fighting La Legión in the main event of Guerra de Titanes 2004, defeating Konnan and Rikishi. The Cibernético / La Parka alliance did not last long as Cibernético formed La Secta Cibernetica in early 2005, siding with Konnan's La Legión. On March 11, 2005, La Parka won his third Rey de Reyes, winning a seven-way elimination match over Latin Lover, Abismo Negro, Chessman, Jeff Jarrett, Konnan and Cibernético. With the victory, La Parka became the only wrestler to ever win three Rey de Reyes tournaments. La Parka's run as the top tecnico of AAA continued, main eventing Triplemania XIII alongside Latin Lover and Octagón, defeating Cibernético, Chessman and Fuerza Guerrera. In early 2006, La Secta de Cibernetica brought in Muerta Cibernetica to strengthen the group, often replacing Cibernético because of various minor injuries. At the 2006 Rey de Reyes, La Parka, Vampiro and Octagón represented AAA in a four-way trios match against La Secta, Team TNA and Los Guapos for the Rey de Reyes trophy. While La Parka did not win, he did help his teammate Vampiro win it. At Triplemania XIV, La Parka faced off against Muerta Cibernetica in a Lucha de Apuesta. In a move that mirrored Triplemania XII, La Parka won, unmasking Muerta Cibernetica. The Legión Extranjera storyline saw La Parka face off against TNA wrestlers such as Abyss, Jeff Jarrett, Elix Skipper and Hotstuff Hernandez.

In late 2006, AAA owner Antonio Peña died, forcing various changes backstage, including Joaquin Roldan taking over the booking duties. One of the things that Roldan changed in AAA was that La Parka was no longer booked as the lone top tecnico anymore, focusing the main storyline more on Cibernético. On March 18, 2007, La Parka won his fourth and final Rey de Reyes tournament, defeating Octagón, Abismo Negro, Rhino, Fuerza Guerrera and Latin Lover in the elimination match final. At Triplemania XV, the La Legión team of Ron Killings, Sabu, Head Hunter A and Rikishi Phatu defeated La Parka, El Zorro, Latin Lover and Animal. Over the summer of 2007, La Parka injured his shoulder in a car accident, forcing him to work a lighter schedule and a less risky style. At the 2007 Antonio Peña Memorial Show, Kenzo Suzuki accidentally aggravated La Parka's injury, forcing him to take time off after the event.

La Parka's shoulder injury kept him sidelined for extended periods in both 2007 and 2008, but he did participate in Triplemania XVI, where he teamed with Chessman and Silver King, only to lose to La Legión, represented by Bobby Lashley, Electroshock and Kenzo Suzuki. The storyline between La Legión and the AAA Loyalists led to a Steel cage match between team AAA (La Parka, Latin Lover, Octagón and Super Fly) and La Legión Extranjera (Electroshock, Konnan, Kenzo Suzuki and Rellik). The storyline leading into the match was that the winning team would gain control of AAA as well as the urn that supposedly contained Antonio Peña's ashes as the symbol of that control. Konnan's team won on the night, taking control of the promotion. In 2009, La Parka's angle with La Legión focused mainly on Silver King, who had turned on La Parka during a match in early 2009 and joined La Legión. Since then, the two faced off in many intense matches, often with inconclusive results. The storyline saw both of them ripping at each other's masks, hinting at a future Lucha de Apuestas match. At Triplemania XVII, La Parka, El Hijo del Santo, Vampiro, Octagón and Jack Evans defeated La Legión (Silver King, Chessman, Electroshock, Kenzo Suzuki and Teddy Hart) in a match where Team AAA won back the storyline control of AAA. At Verano de Escandalo (2009), La Parka was pinned by Silver King as La Parka, Marco Corleone and Octagón lost to Los Wagnermaniacos (Silver King, Electroshock and Último Gladiador).

==== Feuding with L.A. Park (2010) ====
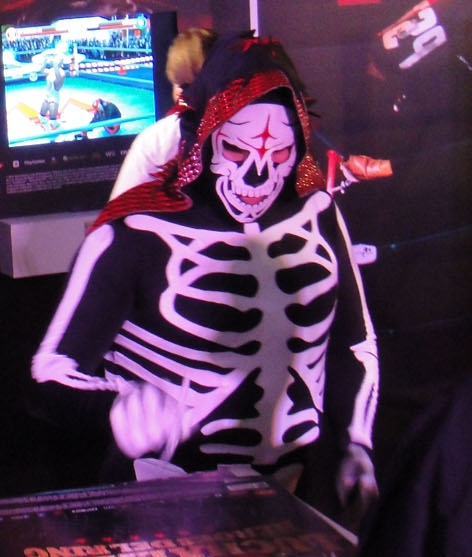
La Parka in 2010

During the 2010 Rey de Reyes, the original La Parka, L.A. Park, returned to AAA 13 years after he left on bad terms to work a storyline feud against the "impostor" La Parka. L.A. Park sided with Dorian Roldan in his feud with his father Joaquin Roldan (president of AAA) while La Parka sided with Joaquin. During an AAA show on March 19, 2010, L.A. Park attacked La Parka once again and put him through a table. At a later show, the two had another brawl, after which La Parka challenged L.A. Park to a match at Triplemania XVIII, under any stipulation the original Parka wanted. During AAA's television taping on April 30, 2010, L.A. Park accepted La Parka's challenge for a match at Triplemania XVIII. At an AAA press conference on May 12, 2010, it was announced that the match between the two would be for the rights to the name "La Parka". The two signed the official contract for the match during a television taping on May 19, 2010. After signing the contract, Dorian Roldan had the police arrest La Parka for piracy by impersonating La Parka. He was released just in time to run in during the semi-main event to attack L.A. Park. At Triplemania XVIII, L.A. Park faced La Parka in the main event. Near the end of the match, Park used a tombstone piledriver, a move that is illegal in Lucha Libre. Joaquin Roldan entered the ring when L.A. Park attempted to use a steel chair on La Parka. When L.A. Park teased using the chair on Joaquin instead, Dorian entered the ring to protest, but was pushed down by Park, who then hit Joaquin with the chair, which caused Dorian to turn on him, hitting him with a steel chair three times. Halloween and Damián 666 from the Perros del Mal wrestling promotion ran to the ring to chase Dorian Roldan away. Then they dragged L.A. Park on top of La Parka before rudo referee Hijo del Tirantes made the three count to give L.A. Park the victory. After the bell rang, the rest of Los Perros del Mal (including Park's son Hijo de L.A. Park) came to the ring to celebrate with L.A. Park, who had won the rights to the name "La Parka". After a couple of minutes, a group of AAA wrestlers led by Octagón came to ringside and in combination with the arena security managed to remove Los Perros del Mal from the ring. La Parka was taken from the ring on a stretcher, not having moved since L.A. Park applied the piledriver. A bit later it was announced that the match result had been thrown out due to interference by Los Perros del Mal, but the following morning it was confirmed that Tapia had indeed won and would now be known as "La Parka" once again, and that AAA's La Parka would have to change his name. However, on June 10 AAA announced that it would respect Mexico City Boxing and Wrestling Commission's decision to throw out the match and as a result both La Parka and L.A. Park would keep their names. On July 4 La Parka defeated L.A. Park in a rematch.

==== El Inframundo (2010–2011) ====
In October 2010, Parka's friend Cibernético turned on him and AAA, after feeling betrayed by them when they didn't trust his claim about not joining La Sociedad, and re-formed his old group Los Bizarros with Amadeus, Billy el Malo, Charly Manson, Escoria, Nygma and Taboo. Parka and Cibernético then started a heated rivalry, during which it was implied that Cibernético had hospitalized Parka's three-year-old son. In May 2011, Parka formed El Inframundo ("The Underworld") with Dark Cuervo, Dark Espíritu, Dark Ozz and Drago to battle Los Bizarros. On June 18 at Triplemanía XIX, Parka, Ozz, Drago and Octagón were defeated by Cibernético, Billy el Malo, Charly Manson and Escoria, when Cibernético pinned Parka following a distraction from Taboo, who appeared at the top of the ramp with his son. After the match it was revealed that Taboo was in fact Parka's brother. Parka would finally get his hands on Taboo on July 31 at Verano de Escándalo in an eight-man tag team match between the two groups, which El Inframundo lost, when Parka was disqualified for excessive violence on his brother.

==== La Sociedad and feud with La Parka Negra (2011–2014) ====
On October 9, 2011, at Héroes Inmortales, Octagón shocked AAA by turning on the promotion by attacking Dr. Wagner Jr. after his match with El Hijo del Perro Aguayo. La Parka entered the ring to seemingly confront his longtime partner, but then also attacked Wagner along with Octagón, Aguayo, Konan Big and Silver King, joining La Sociedad. At the first post-Héroes Inmortales television tapings on October 21, Parka blamed his turn on AAA for bringing back L.A. Park after his 15 years of loyal service, and the promotion's fans for choosing to root for both Park and Cibernético over him during his past two rivalries. On December 1, Parka and Park put their past differences aside, when they teamed together for the first time, defeating Dr. Wagner Jr. and Electroshock in a tag team main event. On March 18, 2012, at Rey de Reyes, La Parka, Dark Dragon and Tito Santana were defeated by Cibernético, Billy el Malo and Escoria in what was billed as the final chapter in the rivalry between Parka and Cibernético. After the match, Octagón turned on Parka, attacking him with Dragon and Santana, which led to Los Bizarros returning to the ring and chasing them away. After initially trying to save his alliance with La Sociedad, La Parka officially turned tecnico and rejoined AAA on April 30.

On August 5 at Triplemanía XX, La Parka teamed with Los Psycho Circus in an eight-man tag team match, where they defeated Octagón and El Consejo, with Parka pinning Octagón for the win. Afterwards, Octagón was attacked by El Consejo, which led to Parka making the save for his former partner. On October 7, 2012, at Héroes Inmortales, La Parka and Octagón made peace with each other, officially ending the short-lived rivalry between the two. On December 2 at Guerra de Titanes, La Sociedad debuted La Parka's new storyline nemesis, La Parka Negra. In the following match, La Parka, Octagón and Octagón Jr. defeated La Parka Negra, the also debuting Pentagón Jr. and Silver King. On October 18, 2013, at Héroes Inmortales VII, La Parka won the 2013 Copa Antonio Peña. On March 16, 2014, at Rey de Reyes, La Parka defeated Black Warrior, El Hijo del Perro Aguayo and El Zorro to win his fifth Rey de Reyes tournament.

==== Later career (2014–2019) ====
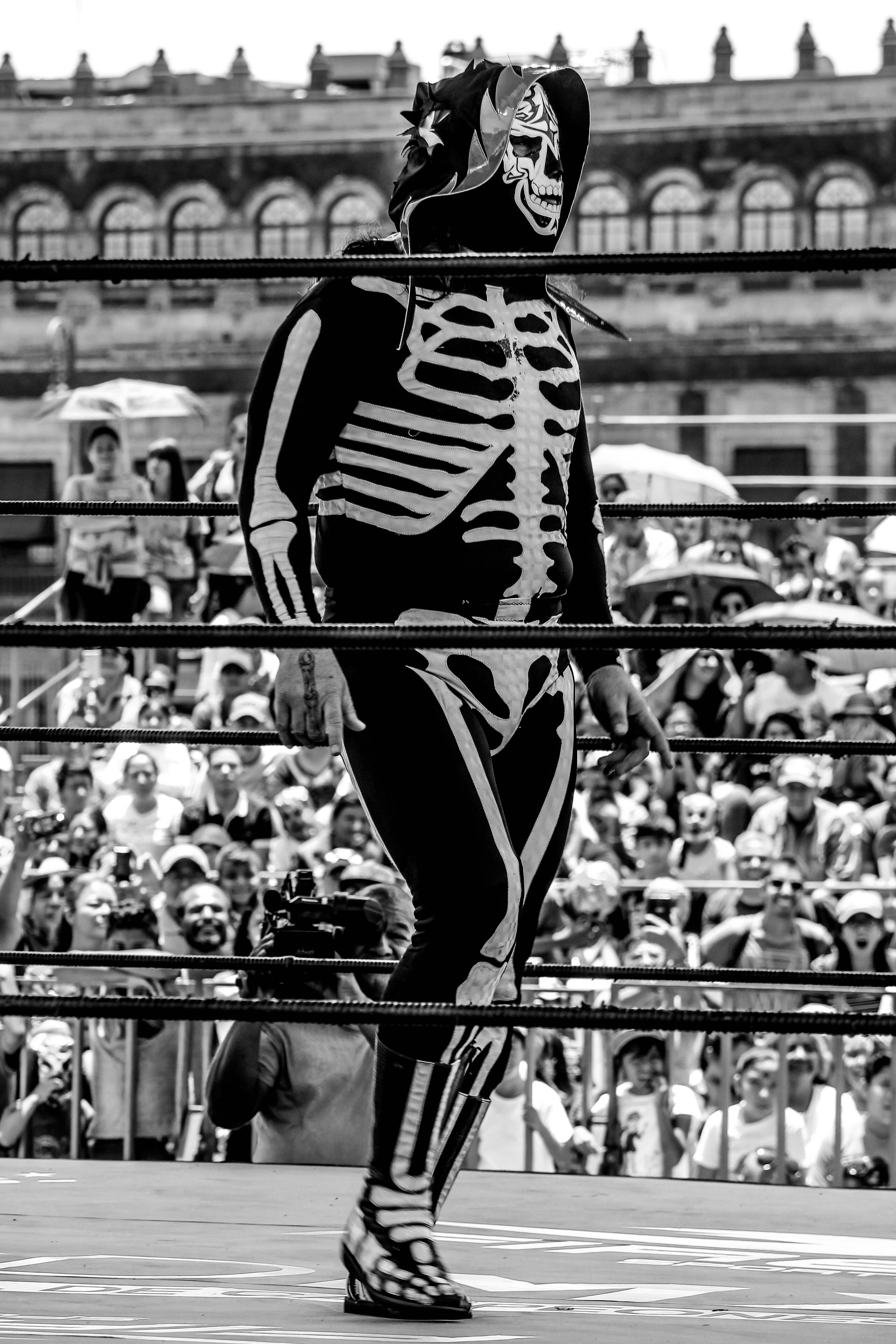
La Parka during a wrestling event in 2018

La Parka continued to make appearances for AAA until his injury in 2019. In 2018 Parka debuted for AAA's partner Impact Wrestling. Parka appeared on the October 4 edition of Impact!, which was taped September 14 at the Frontón México Entertainment Center in Mexico City, answering Eli Drake's open challenge and subsequently picking up the count-out victory.

== Other media ==
La Parka has appeared in the video game Lucha Libre AAA: Héroes del Ring.

== Personal life ==
In August 2019 La Parka introduced "Karis La Momia Jr."; a son who decided to follow in La Parka's footsteps and become a professional wrestler. Shortly after his father's death, his son began incorporating elements of the La Parka gimmick into his wrestling character.

La Parka's brother "Taboo," also a wrestler, died on September 11, 2020.

== Injury and death ==
During a Kaoz show on October 21, 2019, La Parka dove out of the ring to the floor, missed his opponent Rush, and hit the steel barrier and concrete floor head first. The impact paralyzed La Parka, and he was immediately taken to Monterrey's OCA hospital. While in the hospital, he began to regain feeling to his extremities. Early the next morning, he underwent surgery for his neck and cervical fractures as well as to relieve pressure to parts of his upper body. It was reported that not only did the injury threaten La Parka's career, but could have been fatal. The following day, a press release was circulated stating that La Parka had died. Hours later, AAA revealed the press release to be false. However, Huerta actually died on January 11, 2020, as a result of the injuries he suffered during the match.

== Legacy and tributes ==
La Parka was regarded as one of Lucha Libre's biggest stars, with Dave Meltzer of the Wrestling Observer Newsletter describing him as being "a key part of the AAA presentation." On January 29, 2020, La Parka (Escoboza) was posthumously inducted into the AAA Hall of Fame as part of the 2020 class.

Following Parka's death, numerous wrestlers and wrestling promotions sent their condolences, including Parka's long-time storyline enemy L.A. Park and AAA's rival promotion Consejo Mundial de Lucha Libre. On January 19, 2020, Toluca FC paid tribute to Parka during their first Clausura 2020 home game.

At Triplemania XXXII: Mexico City on August 17, 2024, a person dressed up as La Parka appeared during the Vampiro vs. El Mesias casket match, having been in a casket that was opened by Mesias and Jeff Jarrett. On March 22, 2025, at the 2025 Rey de Reyes, AAA debuted a third La Parka.

== Championships and accomplishments ==
- DDT Pro-Wrestling
  - Ironman Heavymetalweight Championship (1 time)
- Lucha Libre AAA Worldwide
  - GPCW SUPER-X Monster Championship (1 time) (Note: The GPCW title was promoted by AAA after Gran Prix Championship Wrestling closed)
  - Mexican National Atómicos Championship (1 time) – with Perro Aguayo Jr., Blue Demon Jr. and Máscara Sagrada Jr. (Note: This Mexican National Championship is sanctioned by the Comision de Box y Lucha D.F. but promoted by AAA)
  - Mexican National Cruiserweight Championship (2 times, final)
  - Mexican National Tag Team Championship (2 times) with Máscara Sagrada (1) and Octagón (1)
  - AAA Hall of Fame (class of 2020)
  - Copa Antonio Peña (2013)
  - Rey de Reyes (2001, 2003, 2005, 2007 and 2014)
  - Copa Triplemanía XXV (2017) – with Argenis and Bengala
- International Wrestling Revolution Group
  - Guerra de Empresas (2012) – with Cibernético
- Pro Wrestling Illustrated
  - PWI ranked him # 43 of the 500 best singles wrestlers of the PWI 500 in 2007

== Luchas de Apuestas record ==
Winner (wager)	Loser (wager)	Location	Event	Date	Notes
Karis la Momia (mask)	Halcón Dorado Jr. (mask)	Acapulco, Guerrero	Triplemanía IV-C	July 15, 1996	(Note: Steel cage match featuring Los Junior Atomicós vs. Karis and Los Payasos.)
La Parka Jr. (mask)	The Panther (hair)	Monterrey, Nuevo León	Live event	January 30, 2000	
La Parka Jr. (mask)	Gigante Drako (mask)	Mexico City	Rey de Reyes	February 5, 2000	
La Parka Jr. (mask)	El Hijo del Espectro (mask)	Tijuana, Baja California	Live event	April 20, 2001	
La Parka Jr. (mask)	Akuma (mask)	Tijuana, Baja California	Live event	August 10, 2001	
La Parka (mask)	Cibernético (mask)	Naucalpan, Mexico State	Triplemanía XII	June 20, 2004	
La Parka (mask)	La Bestia (mask)	Reynosa, Tamaulipas	Live event	August 31, 2004	
La Parka (mask)	El Angel (hair)	Reynosa, Tamaulipas	Live event	August 30, 2005	
La Parka (mask)	Destroyer II (mask)	Reynosa, Tamaulipas	Live event	October 25, 2005	
La Parka (mask)	Muerte Cibernetica (mask)	Naucalpan, Mexico State	Triplemanía XIV	June 18, 2006	
