= Cibernético =

Mexican professional wrestler

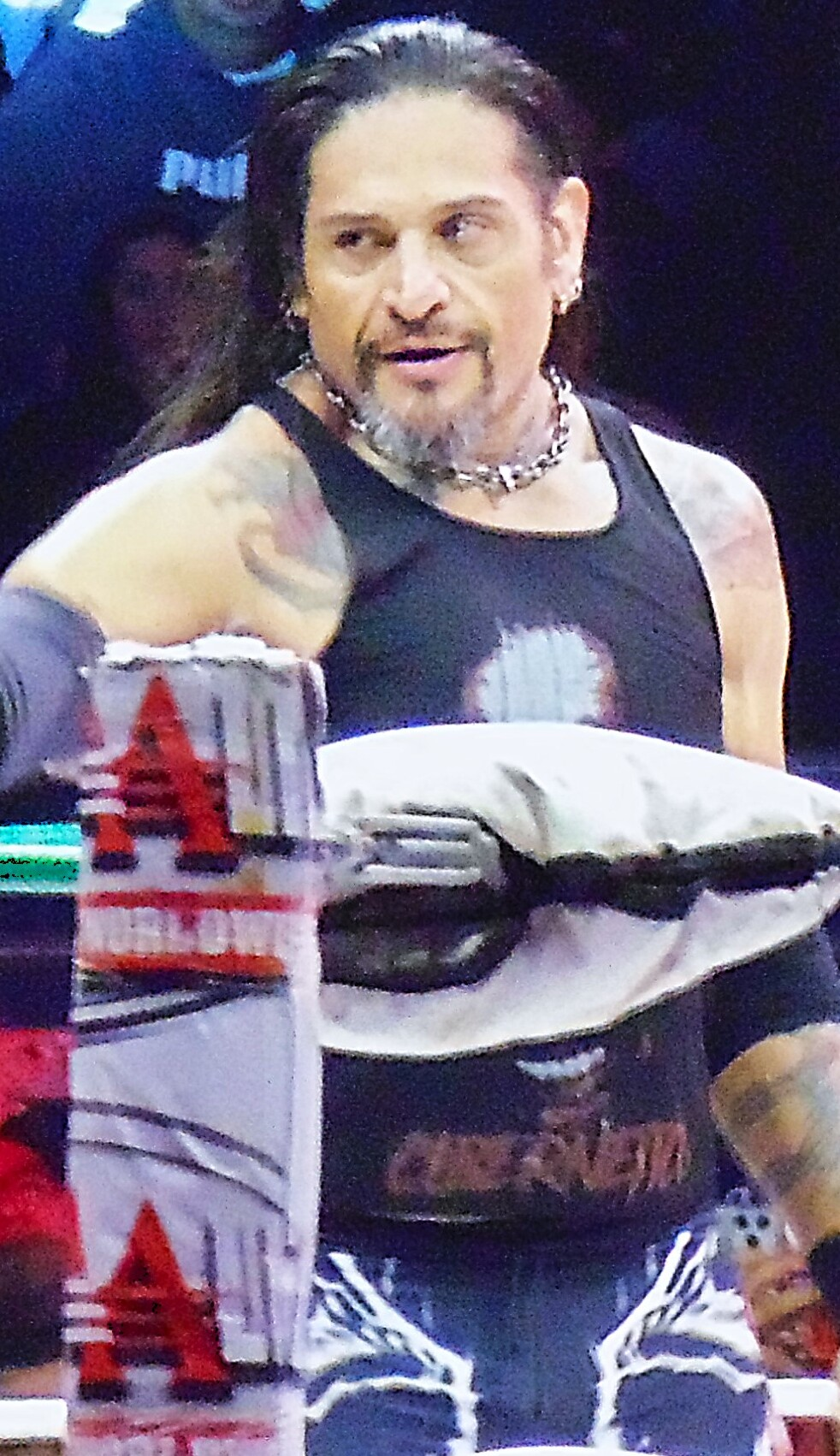
- Cibernético in 2026

Personal information
- Born: Octavio López Arreola; April 12, 1975 (age 51) Aguascalientes, Aguascalientes

Professional wrestling career
- Ring name(s): Cibernético; Ciber the Main Man; Cybernetico; Espiritu Negro; Urko
- Billed height: 1.84 m (6 ft 0 in)
- Billed weight: 107 kg (236 lb)
- Billed from: "Hell"
- Trained by: Karloff Lagarde; Ray Mendoza; Ojo de Tigre; Villano III; Ébano Ruiz
- Debut: March 1992

Octavio López Arreola (born April 12, 1975), better known by the ring name Cibernético, is a Mexican professional wrestler, working for promotion Lucha Libre AAA Worldwide (AAA).

During AAA's short partnership with the World Wrestling Federation, he participated in the 1997 Royal Rumble and wrestled on Raw is War and WWF Shotgun Saturday Night, often teaming with Pierroth Jr. He is a former AAA Mega Champion as well as a former three time Campeón de Campeones, the predecessor to the AAA world championship.

== Professional wrestling career ==
=== Universal Wrestling Association (1992–1995) ===
Octavio López started out as a body builder, developing the physique that would later on become one of his strong points. He began training for a professional wrestling career in the Universal Wrestling Association (UWA) Gym under Karloff Lagarde and Ray Mendoza as well as training with Ojo de Tigre and Ebano Ruiz. He made his professional wrestling debut in 1992 under the ring name Urko and later worked as Espiritu Negro for a brief period of time. After wrestling for a few months he decided to dedicate himself to developing his physique and receive further training in the UWA wrestling school. In June 1994 he made his re-debut for the UWA, this time working under a new ring character, Cibernético, (meaning "cybernetic" or Cyborg), complete with a colorful mask that looked like it had printed circuitry on it to enhance the "Cyborg" character. On July 31, 1994, Cibernétcio wrestled on his first Toreo de Cuatro Caminos show, UWA's biggest venue. On the night he teamed up with veterans El Canek and Dos Caras, taking on Los Villanos, Villano III, Villano IV and Villano V. While he made his debut as a tecnico (fan favorite) he soon turned against El Canek, turning rudo (villain), setting up a feud with the UWA's top tecnico in the hopes of using Cibernético to replace some of the UWA headliners that had left the promotion. The attempt to create new headliners was too late and by January 1995 the UWA closed down.

=== Asistencia Asesoría y Administración/Lucha Libre AAA World Wide ===
==== Championship reigns (1995–1997) ====
After the UWA closed he began working for Asistencia Asesoría y Administración (AAA, later known as Lucha Libre AAA World Wide). On October 27, 1995, defeated Perro Aguayo to win the WWA World Heavyweight Championship, his first wrestling championship. Perro Aguayo later gained the championship back. In AAA Cibernético began to regularly team up with the experienced rudo (bad guy) Pierroth, Jr. On June 6, 1996, the team of Cibernético and Pierroth, Jr. participated in the World Wrestling Peace Festival in Los Angeles, California, where they lost to the team of Perro Aguayo and La Parka. Cibernético worked his first major AAA show on May 11, 1996, when he teamed with El Picudo and Mosco de la Merced at Triplemanía IV-A. The team defeated Octagón, Último Dragón and La Parka in the third match of the night when Cibernético won the deciding fall by pinning Octagón. A month later he also wrestled at Triplemanía IV-B where Cibernético, Octagón and Psicosis lost to Perro Aguayo, Villano III and Villano IV.

The following year Cibernético wrestled at both Triplemanía IV-B and Triplemanía V-B. At V-A he faced and defeated former ally Pierroth, Jr. in a singles match after Cibernético had turned on his partner earlier in the year. Two days later he participated in the main event of Triplemania V-B as he teamed with Perro Aguayo, Octagón and El Canek to defeat Jake Roberts, Gorgeous George III, El Cobarde, Jr. and Fuerza Guerrera. A week later, on June 22, 1997, Cibernético defeated Máscara Sagrada to win the Mexican National Heavyweight Championship during an AAA show in Mexico City. Over the summer of 1997 Cibernético reignited his feud with El Canek, drawing on their past from the UWA. At the inaugural Verano de Escandalo El Canek defeated Cibernético in a Steel Cage Match.

==== Los Vipers (1997–1999) ====
In August 1997 Cibernético unveiled a new stable called Los Vipers; which, besides himself, consisted of former Rudos de la Galaxia members Abismo Negro, Maniaco, Mosco de la Merced and Histeria. That group was joined by Psicosis II and Electroshock as well as Los Mini Vipers, Mini-Estrella Mini Abismo Negro, Mini Histeria, (Note: Not the wrestler currently working as Mini Histeria in AAA) and Mosquito de la Merced. Not long after Los Vipers was formed AAA had to replace the original Histeria, who became Super Crazy, with a new Histeria. Only a short time later AAA also had to replace the original Mosco de la Merced as well, when he left the promotion, with a new Mosco de la Merced, sometimes referred to as Mosco de la Merced II. (Note: The original Mosco de la Merced now wrestles as X-Fly since he did not hold the trademark to the Mosco de la Merced character.)

The group was a success, propelling Cibernético up the ranks within a few months of the group being unveiled. On December 5, 1997, Cibernético defeated Latin Lover to win the AAA Campeón de Campeones Championship, the top title in the promotion at the time. In 1998 he briefly exchanged the Campeon de Campeones title with longtime rival Perro Aguayo. Cibernético competed in the 1999 Rey de Reyes ("King of Kings") tournament on March 7, 1999. In the first round he defeated stablemate Abismo Negro as well as Dos Caras and Máscara Sagrada to qualify for the finals. In the finals he defeated Octagón, Latin Lover and Electroshock to become the 1999 Rey de Reyes. By late 1999 Los Vipers began fighting amongst themselves as Abismo Negro made a bid to become the leader of the group. The storyline led to the creation of two separate Vipers factions. Cibernético led a group called Los Vipers Primera Clase ("The First Class Vipers") consisting of himself Psicosis II, Histeria, Mosco De La Merced, Maniaco, Mini Psicosis, Mosquito De La Merced and Mini Histeria. Abismo Negro's group was known as Los Vipers Extreme ("The Extreme Vipers") and besides himself featured Electroshock, Pentagon, Shiiba, El Cuervo and Mini Abismo Negro. After several months of tension and fighting between the Los Vipers factions the storyline was suddenly dropped and the feuding factions reunited.

==== Lucha Libre Latina (1999–2004) ====
By the end of 1999 Cibernético formed another rudo faction, a group called Lucha Libre Latina (LLL), a group intent on taking over AAA that was inspired by World Championship Wrestling's New World Order. Los Vipers became a subgroup within LLL, and Abismo Negro assumed leadership of Los Vipers after Cibernético. Cibernético looked like he could repeat as Rey de Reyes winner at the 2000 Event, but was defeated by Abismo Negro in the final. A few months later Cibernético teamed up with LLL members Abismo Negro, Electroshock and Pro Wrestling Noah wrestler Shiima Nobunaga in the main event of Triplemanía VIII, only to lose to Octagón, Jushin Thunder Liger, Latin Lover and El Alebrije. While Cibernético was leading LLL Abismo Negro was rising through the ranks of AAA, bolstered by his leadership of Los Vipers. Negro's status as a main eventer caused storyline problems between LLL's leader Cibernético and Abismo Negro, leading to a series of matches between the two to see who should lead and who should follow. On September 29, 2000, Negro defeated Cibernético in a one on one match at Verano de Escandalo 2000. When the two faced off in a steel cage match at Guerrera de Titanes 2000, the match ended without a winner, after which the rivalry between the leader and the deputy leader was put on the back burner. On June 30, 2001, Cibernético's almost three-year-long reign as Campeon de Campeones was ended when Heavy Metal won the title from him. Cibernético regained the title less than two months later, becoming the only three time Campeon de Campeones in the history of the title. Cibernético would retain the title until AAA quietly stopped promoting the belt some time in 2005. Cibernético's LLL was seen as a direct challenge to the authority of AAA founder and owner Antonio Peña and led to a match between Cibernético and Peña, who had been a wrestler before retiring in the 1980s. The two wrestled at the 2001 Guerrera de Titanes which Cibernético easily won in under three minutes. On January 20, 2002, Cibernético finally managed to defeat his longtime rival El Canek to win the UWA World Heavyweight Championship, a title he would retain for almost 10 months before El Canek regained the title on November 15, 2002.

==== La Secta Cibernetica (2004–2006) ====
In 2004, Cibernético once again founded a new group, La Secta Cibernética, a pseudo-religious cult, with Cibernético as its "religious leader". The group consisted of Cibernético's longtime associates Charly Manson and Chessman who had both been part of Los Vipers and LLL, and also included The Black Family (Ozz, Cuervo, Espiritu and Escoria). La Secta Cibernetica continued the storyline with Peña's loyalists that had been started back in the LLL days. Peña's main defender was La Parka (II), which in turn made him Cibernético's main rival. The two men faced off in the main event of Triplemanía XII in one of the biggest Lucha de Apuesta, or "mask vs. mask" matches of the year. In the end the Peña backed La Parka defeated Cibernético and forced him to unmask after the match. At the following show, Verano de Escandalo (2004) La Parka once again got the better of Cibernético, defeating him in a "Lights out" match. Frustrated by his inability to defeat La Parka (in the storyline) Cibernético brought in a masked wrestler called Muerte Cibernética ("Cybernetic Death") to target La Parka. At Triplemanía XIV La Parka repeated the feat and unmasked Muerte Cibernética just like he had unmasked Cibernético two years prior Following the unmasking Muerte Cibernética slowly began to take control of La Secta, taking advantage of Cibernético suffering a serious knee injury that took him away from the ring for several months.

==== Los Hell Brothers (2006–2008) ====
When Cibernético returned to the ring he turned tecnico for the first time in his AAA career and created a new group called Los Hell Brothers with former La Secta members Chessman and Charly Manson. Together the group fought against Muerte Cibernética's La Secta de la Muerte group. The storyline between the two factions reached its crescendo at the 2006 Guerra de Titanes where Cibernético defeated his opponent in an "extreme coffin" match with the storyline featuring Muerte Cibernética locked in the coffin and then thrown into a volcano. The storyline led to Muerte Cibernética returning a few months later under the name "El Mesias", claiming that he was resurrected from the dead. El Mesias and the Secta de Mesias joined forced with Konnan's La Legión Extranjera ("The Foreign Legion") to become the top rudo faction of AAA. Meanwhile, Cibernético and Los Hell Brothers quickly became the most popular group in AAA, aided by Cibernétcio and La Parka reconciling their past differences. At Triplemanía XV Los Hell Brothers defeated the team of El Mesias and La Legión members Sean Waltman, and Kenzo Suzuki in a Domo De La Muerte cage match. Cibernético was the last man to leave the cage to earn the victory; as a result of the outcome Kenzo Suzuki was shaved bald after the match.

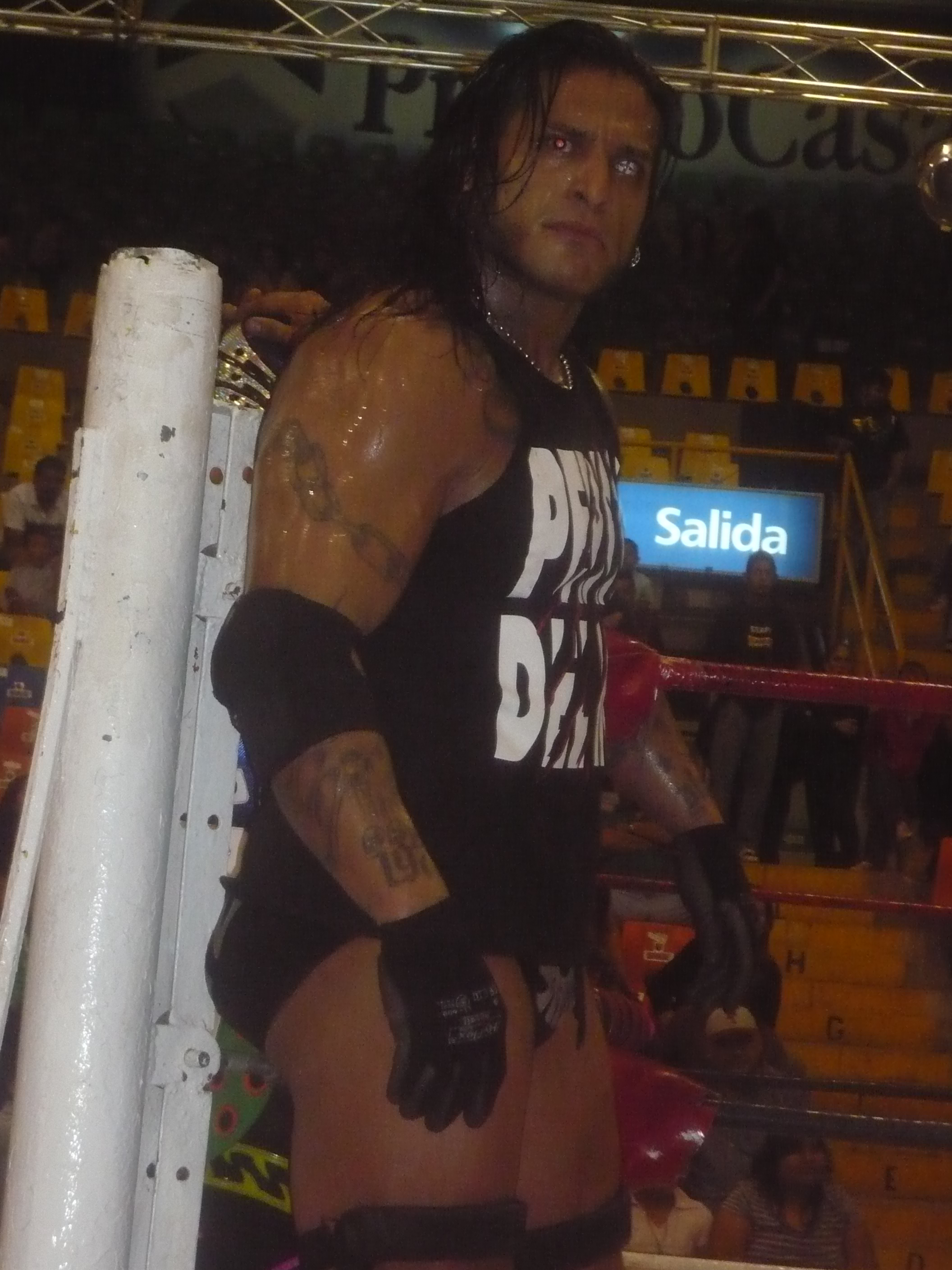
Cibernético in 2008

In the fall of 2007 AAA decided to create a single top championship when they introduced the AAA Mega Championship. The tournament saw Cibernético defeat Mr. Niebla in the first round, only for him to lose to his fellow Hell Brother Chessman in the second round. On the same night that El Mesias became the first ever AAA Mega Champion Cibernético, Charly Manson and El Zorro defeated La Secta de Mesias in a Domo de la Muerte match that served as the main event of the 2007 Verano de Escandalo. As a result of their loss Espiritu had his hair shaved off. Cibernético immediately targeted El Mesias' newly won title, earning a title shot at the 2007 Guerra de Titanes, in a match that also included El Zorro. During the match El Mesias and El Zorro poured lighter fluid on a table, set it on fire and then powerbombed Cibernético through the table. While the stunt was designed to look more dangerous than it actually was, Cibernético suffered serious burns to his back and shoulder when the stunt did not go as planned. AAA wrote the accident into the storyline, making it appear that El Mesias and El Zorro meant to injure Cibernético. Taking advantage of the emotional support Cibernético received during his recovery AAA decided to have Cibernético win the AAA Mega Championship on March 16, 2008, as he defeated El Mesias in the main event of the 2008 Rey de Reyes show. Cibernético would go on to gain revenge on El Zorro for his part in the injury as he successfully defended the AAA Mega Championship against El Zorro in the main event of Triplemanía XVI.

After gaining revenge on El Mesias and El Zorro Cibernético had to contend with a challenger from within Los Hell Brothers. Chessman had earned the number one contender position and was demanding that Cibernético should defend the title against him. With the tension building between the two they asked Charly Manson to pick a side, but instead of breaking his friendship with either wrestler he walked away, ending Los Hell Brothers. After the break-up Chessman turned rudo on Cibernético, attacking him after a match. The title match between the two took place at the 2008 Verano de Escandalo, which Cibernético won. Cibernético also won a subsequent rematch at the 2008 Antonio Peña Memorial Show in a match that also included El Zorro.

=== World Wrestling Federation (1996–1997) ===
In late 1996 Cibernético began making appearances on the United States-based World Wrestling Federation (WWF) due to a working relationship between AAA and the WWF. Cibernético (billed as "Cybernetico" in the WWF) and Pierroth, Jr. showed up during the WWF's In Your House 12: It's Time show as they came to ringside during a WWF World Tag Team Championship match between champions Owen Hart and The British Bulldog defending against Razor Ramon II and Diesel II to antagonize the champions. The storyline was supposed to set up Cibernético and Pierroth, Jr. as challengers for Hart and Bulldog's championship. While in the WWF Cibernético and Pierroth, Jr. defeated The New Rockers (Marty Jannetty and Leif Cassidy) at a Raw show and later lost to Doug Furnas and Phil LaFon by disqualification during a Superstars taping. Cibernético and Pierroth, Jr. both participated in the 1997 Royal Rumble elimination match. He was the 15th man to enter the ring. He was eliminated by Pierroth, Jr. and Mil Máscaras, the other two AAA representatives in the match. The Rumble was Cibernético's last appearance for the WWF.

=== Independent circuit (2008–2009) ===
Konnan and La Legión won the storyline control of AAA at the 2008 Peña memorial show, a move that led to Cibernético quitting AAA and vacating the championship. During his last wrestling appearance for AAA Cibernético put on a Los Perros del Mal T-shirt, which lead to speculation that the Perros del Mal were coming to AAA. It was later confirmed that Cibernético was indeed leaving AAA with rumors of him working for the Perros del Mal wrestling promotion. Initially this was believed to be just a storyline planned by AAA and Cibernético, but when Cibernético appeared on the first Perros del Mal show promoted by Perro Aguayo, Jr. it seemed that real life had imitated the storyline and that Cibernético had indeed left AAA. Early on Cibernético worked together with Perro Aguayo, Jr. who led the Perros del Mal stable, but soon the storyline changed into a four-way rivalry between himself, Aguayo, Jr., L.A. Park and Dr. Wagner, Jr. He also worked several Universal Wrestling Entertainment (UWE) shows, main eventing against his old rival El Canek as well as Dr. Wagner, Jr. and L.A. Park. While on the independent circuit Cibernético founded a group called Los Bizarros, a group representing "alternative life styles" such as Punk, Emo and Cross-dressing. Although he had left AAA, the two parties were trying to work out a deal for Cibernético's return to the promotion. He was originally slated to be Charly Manson's "surprise partner" at the 2009 Rey de Reyes show, but a deal could not be reached between the two parties. Later on Cibernético worked for AAA, participating in their tour of the western United States in April 2009, with Cibernético claiming that he only did it out of loyalty to the Peña family.

=== Return to AAA ===
==== Feud with La Legión Extranjera (2009–2010) ====
In late June 2009, not long after Konnan and La Legión had lost their power in AAA, Cibernético returned to AAA full-time. Even after he returned to AAA full-time he was still promoted for a Perros del Mal show in June that was also supposed to feature Dr. Wagner, Jr. in the end neither wrestler appeared on the show as they were working for AAA on that date. In Cibernético's first appearance on AAA television attacked the then reigning AAA Mega Champion Dr. Wagner, Jr., inserting himself in the main event storyline between Dr. Wagner, Jr. and El Mesias. This led to a three-way world title match at the 2009 Verano de Escandalo show. Cibernético was the first man eliminated from the match and was subsequently removed from the storyline as Dr. Wagner, Jr. defeated El Mesias to retain the championship. At AAA's Héroes Inmortales III show on October 31, 2009, Cibernético won a 12-man Battle Royal to win the 2009 Copa Antonio Peña.

In the days following Heroes Inmortales III a story of a backstage fight between Cibernético and Konnan surfaced, making it appear that the two had a legitimate problem with each other that went beyond fictional storylines. The "real" aspects of the fight were soon questioned, making it obvious that it was, like everything else that appears on wrestling shows, a staged event to build the feud between Cibernético and Konnan. AAA worked the past history of Cibernético and Konnan into a heated storyline, citing Cibernético's supposed "real life" problems with Konnan and vice versa. Cibernético was attacked several times by Konnan and La Legión Extranjera, both during a press conference and a later television taping in preparation for a match between the two at the 2009 Guerra de Titanes. The match at Guerra de Titanes was planned out to include Konnan's La Legión interfering in the match, beating Cibernético so that Konnan could win the match. The ensuring attack was described as a "massacre" due to the large amount of blood Cibernético spilled during the match. Following the event Cibernético did not appear for several AAA events to illustrate how brutal the match at Guerra de Titanes was. When he finally did return he had allied himself with the undefeated Los Psycho Circus to counter Konnan's La Legión Extranjera and even the sides. During an AAA Television taping on February 18, 2010, in Toluca, Mexico State Cibernético challenged Konnan to a Lumberjack match where members of La Legión and Los Psycho Circus would serve as lumberjacks. At the 2010 Rey de Reyes Cibernético defeated Konnan in a match that resembled a no rules fight more than a professional wrestling match, including Konnan's forehead bleeding profusely. During the match La Legión attacked Cibernético but Los Psycho Circus was able to hold La Legión off while Cibernético applied the Garra Cibernetica ("Cibernético Claw; a Chokeslam) on Konnan to gain the victory. After the match La Legión attacked Cibernético, drawing out El Mesias to aid Cibernético. After a couple of moments of fighting Dorian Roldan and a man wearing a black trenchcoat and a black balaclava comes to the ring, attacking Cibernético and El Mesias to give La Legión the advantage. Afterwards the masked man was revealed to be L.A. Park who was siding with La Legión.

Following his victory over Konnan Cibernético began targeting the other members of La Legión, especially longtime member El Zorro and Vampiro who had recently sided with them. When El Mesias was forced out of the ring due to a shoulder injury Cibernético had to fight the odds by himself. At Triplemanía XVIII Cibernético teamed up with Total Nonstop Action Wrestling (TNA) worker Abyss to fight El Zorro and Vampiro in a hardcore match. The match saw the interference of La Legión members Chessman, Christopher Daniels, Alex Koslov, Nosawa and Hernandez throughout the match. Near the end of the match Vampiro got into an argument with Konnan resulting in Konnan tossing a handful of white powder into Vampiro's face. Blinded, Vampiro became a victim of Cibernético's Garra Cibernetica for the pin fall. After the match La Legión attacked the two tecnicos again, but were fought off, then beaten down by Cibernético, with assist from La Hermandad 187 (Nicho el Millonario and Joe Líder).

==== Los Bizarros and La Secta Bizarra (2010–2013) ====
Cibernético was scheduled to team up Heavy Metal, La Parka and Octagón at Héroes Inmortales IV against La Sociedad, a superstable consisting of the invading Los Perros del Mal stable, La Legión Extranjera, La Milicia and Los Maniacos, but prior to the match La Sociedad's leader Konnan announced that Cibernético had decided to turn his back on AAA and join his team instead. AAA bought Konnan's claim and replaced Cibernético and Octagón, who was injured in a backstage assault by someone resembling Cibernético (later revealed as Super Fly), in the match with Dark Ozz and Dark Cuervo. However, in the end Cibernético interfered in the match and helped AAA pick up the win. Afterwards, Cibernético, upset with AAA and in particular his friend La Parka for believing he had turned on the company, decided to re–form Los Bizarros with Amadeus, Escoria, Nygma and Taboo. On November 22 Los Bizarros solidified their statuses as tweeners by attacking not only La Sociedad, but also La Parka. On December 5, 2010, at Guerra de Titanes Charly Manson was revealed as the newest member of Los Bizarros, as he made a surprise jump from Consejo Mundial de Lucha Libre (CMLL) back to AAA. During Cibernético's and La Parka's heated rivalry it was implied that Cibernético had assaulted and hospitalized Parka's three-year-old son, his own godson. On March 13, 2011, La Milicia and La Sociedad member Billy el Malo, who had been secretly working for Cibernético since at least October 2010, made a jump to Los Bizarros. In May, La Parka formed his own group El Inframundo ("The Underworld") to counteract Los Bizarros. On June 18 at Triplemanía XIX, Cibernético, Billy el Malo, Charly Manson and Escoria defeated La Parka, Dark Ozz, Drago and Octagón, when Cibernético pinned Parka following a distraction from Taboo, who appeared at the top of the ramp with his son. After the match it was revealed that Taboo was in fact Parka's brother. On October 9 at Héroes Inmortales, both Cibernético and La Parka took part in the Copa Antonio Peña gauntlet match and ended up causing each other's eliminations from the match. Later in the event, the rivalry took a surprise twist, when Parka turned rudo and joined La Sociedad. Cibernético finalized his technico turn on December 1 by feigning joining La Sociedad, before turning on them and being beaten down and bloodied by Los Perros del Mal. On March 18, 2012, at Rey de Reyes, Cibernético, Billy el Malo and Escoria defeated La Parka, Dark Dragon and Tito Santana in what was billed as the final chapter in the rivalry between Cibernético and Parka. After the match, Parka's stablemates attacked him, which led to Los Bizarros returning to the ring and chasing them away, saving Parka.

In June, Cibernético began feuding with El Hijo del Perro Aguayo and his Los Perros del Mal stable, who had in storyline sidelined El Mesías with an arm injury. On August 18, Cibernético combined his two previous stables, Los Bizarros and La Secta, to form La Secta Bizarra Cibernetica, continuing his rivalry with Los Perros del Mal. The rivalry between Cibernético and Aguayo culminated in a Lucha de Apuestas in the main event of Triplemanía XXI on June 16, 2013, where Cibernético was defeated and, as a result, forced to have his head shaved. Cibernético and Aguayo had a rematch on August 2, where Cibernético was victorious. Post-match, Cuervo, Escoria, Espiritu and Ozz turned on their La Secta leader Cibernético, forming a new rudo version of the stable. Cibernético then came together with Aguayo and El Mesías to battle his former stable. On December 8 at Guerra de Titanes, Aguayo turned on Cibernético and joined the reformed La Sociedad.

==== Los Hell Brothers return (2014–2015) ====
On September 14, 2014, Cibernético announced he was forming a new group to battle La Sociedad. On September 26, Cibernético turned rudo and revealed that his "new" group was the reformed Los Hell Brothers stable, now made up himself, Chessman and Averno. In February 2015, Los Hell Brothers officially joined La Sociedad. On June 14, 2015, at Verano de Escándalo, Los Hell Brothers won the AAA World Trios Championship. On November 9, Cibernético announced his departure from AAA.

=== Lucha Libre Elite (2015–2017) ===
On November 15, 2015, Cibernético made his debut for Lucha Libre Elite, attacking Carístico. He then formed another version of Los Hell Brothers with Black Warrior, Mephisto and Sharlie Rockstar, the former Charly Manson. On May 21, 2016, Cibernético became the inaugural Elite Heavyweight Champion.

=== Return to CMLL (2018–2019) ===
Cibernético returned to CMLL on June 15, 2018, working the main event of CMLL's Super Viernes show, where he, Rush and El Terrible defeated the team of L.A. Park, Rey Fénix and Volador Jr. by disqualification. Two weeks later Cibernético, billed as "Ciber the Main Main" joined forces with Sharlie Rock Star (Formerly Charly Rockstar) and The Chrizh (formerly El Zorro) as "Klan Kaoz" (later renamed "The Cl4n") made their CMLL debut, losing to Carístico, Valiente and Volador Jr. At the CMLL 85th Anniversary Show on September 14, 2018, The Cl4n defeated Los Guerreros Laguneros (Euforia, Gran Guerrero and Último Guerrero) to win the CMLL World Trios Championship.

=== Second return to AAA (2021–present) ===
On December 4, 2021, at Triplemanía Regia II, Cibernético made his return to AAA after a six-year hiatus.

== In other media ==
In 2007 Cibernético starred in as the title character of a comic book published by "SuperComics". While the comic starred a wrestler it was not a comic about professional wrestling, instead the story was set in a futuristic Mexico, with Cibernético as a biker saves a small town from the bad guys. The story was called "El Ojo Cibernético, e Historias de Carretera", or "The Cybernetic eye, and stories of the highway". In August 2010 Cibernético was featured in a national television commercial in Mexico for the fast food franchise Burger King.

== Championships and accomplishments ==
- Asistencia Asesoría y Administración / Lucha Libre AAA World Wide
  - AAA Campeón de Campeones Championship (3 times)
  - AAA Mega Championship (1 time)
  - AAA Parejas Increibles Tag Team Championship (1 time) – with Konnan
  - AAA World Trios Championship (1 time) – with Averno and Chessman
  - GPCW SUPER-X Monster Championship (1 time) (Note: GPCW championship recognized by AAA after GPCW folded)
  - IWC World Heavyweight Championship (1 time) (Note: Not to be confused with a similarly named IWC World Heavyweight Championship promoted outside of AAA.)
  - Mexican National Heavyweight Championship (1 time)
  - Copa Antonio Peña (2009)
  - Rey de Reyes (1999)
- Consejo Mundial de Lucha Libre

- CMLL World Trios Championship (1 time) – with The Chris and Sharlie Rockstar

- International Wrestling Revolution Group
  - Guerra de Empresas: 2012 – with La Parka
- Lucha Libre Elite
  - Elite Heavyweight Championship (1 time, current)
- Pro Wrestling Illustrated
  - PWI ranked him # 26 of the 500 best singles wrestlers in the PWI 500 in 2007
- Universal Wrestling Association
  - UWA World Heavyweight Championship (1 time)
- World Wrestling Association
  - WWA World Heavyweight Championship (1 time)

== Luchas de Apuestas record ==
Winner (wager)	Loser (wager)	Location	Event	Date	Notes
La Parka (mask)	Cibernético (mask)	Naucalpan, Mexico	Triplemanía XII	June 20, 2004	
Cibernético (hair)	Kenzo Suzuki (hair)	Mexico City, State of Mexico	Triplemanía XV	July 15, 2007	(Note: This was a steel cage match that also included Charly Manson, Chessman, X-Pac, and El Mesias.)
Cibernético (hair)	Espiritu (hair)	Guadalajara, Jalisco	Verano de Escandalo	September 16, 2007	(Note: This was a steel cage Match that also included Charly Manson, Chessman, El Zorro, Ozz, Escoria, and Cuervo.)
El Hijo del Perro Aguayo (hair)	Cibernético (hair)	Mexico City, State of Mexico	Triplemanía XXI	June 16, 2013	
Pagano (hair)	Cibernético (hair)	Mexico City, State of Mexico	Triplemanía XXX: Mexico City	October 15, 2022	
Cibernético (hair)	Psicosis (mask)	Azcapotzalco, Mexico City,	Triplemanía XXXII: Mexico City	August 17, 2024	(Note: This was a Domo De La Muerte cage match that also involved Murder Clown, Dave the Clown, Panic Clown, Dark Cuervo, Dark Ozz, El Fiscal and Abismo Negro Jr.)
