= Triplemanía IV-B =

1996 Lucha Libre AAA World Wide event

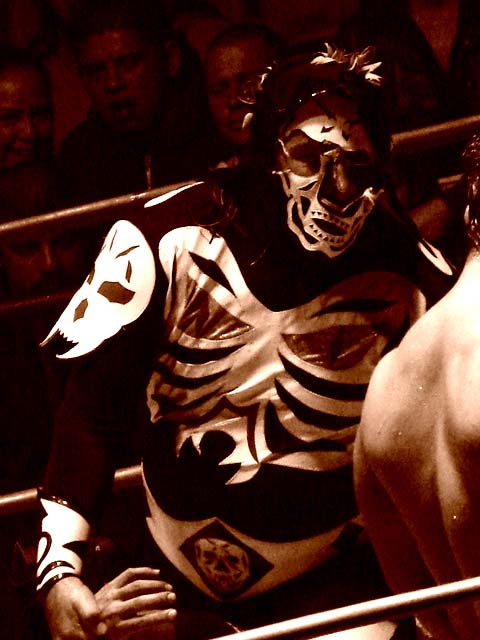
- La Parka, teaming with Octagón, and Máscara Sagrada to win the main event match
- Promotion: AAA
- Date: June 15, 1996
- City: Orizaba, Veracruz, Mexico
- Venue: Orizaba Bullring
- Attendance: 7,000

Triplemanía chronology
← Previous; IV-A	Next → IV-C

Triplemanía IV-B was a major professional wrestling, show promoted by the Mexican-based AAA and was the second of three Triplemanía IV shows held in 1996. The event took place on June 15, 1996, at the International Amphitheatre in Orizaba, Veracruz, Mexico. The annual Triplemanía show(s) are AAA's biggest show of the year, serving as the culmination of major storylines and feature wrestlers from all over the world competing in what has been described as AAA's version of WrestleMania or their Super Bowl event.

The Main event featured a Lumberjack match between the teams of La Parka, Octagón, and Máscara Sagrada and Killer, Cien Caras, and Heavy Metal. The show also featured an Elimination match with eight different champions, competing for the title of Campeón de Campeones ("Champions of Champions"). The show also featured an Eight-man "Atómicos" tag team match that was a preview for the main event of Triplemanía IV-C as the team known as Los Junior Atómicos (Máscara Sagrada Jr., Tinieblas Jr., Blue Demon Jr., and Halcón Dorado Jr.) fought against Los Payasos ("The Clowns"; Coco Rojo, Coco Verde and Coco Amarillo) and Karis la Momia

== Production ==
=== Background ===
Just like in 1994 and 1995 AAA planned out three Triplemanía events in 1994, the first Triplemanía show slated for May 11, the second Triplemanía IV show was booked for June 15 in Orizaba, Veracruz and the Third Triplemanía IV on July 15 in Madero. AAA promoter Antonio Peña wanted to expand AAA into the United States, building on the success they had so far in both Los Angeles and Chicago up to that point and the first Triplemanía IV would take place in Chicago at the International Amphitheatre. The second Triplemanía IV show would take place at the Orizaba Bullring in Orizaba, Veracruz, returning to Mexican soil for the last two shows. Triplemanía IV-B was the ninth overall show produced under the Triplemanía banner.

=== Storylines ===
The Triplemanía show featured six professional wrestling matches with different wrestlers involved in pre-existing scripted feuds, plots and storylines. Wrestlers were portrayed as either heels (referred to as rudos in Mexico, those that portray the "bad guys") or faces (técnicos in Mexico, the "good guy" characters) as they followed a series of tension-building events, which culminated in a wrestling match or series of matches.

In late 1995 tecnico Halcón Dorado Jr. came to AAA from the UWA as it was closing its doors. In AAA he quickly found himself partnered up with a number of other "Juniors", Blue Demon Jr., Máscara Sagrada Jr. and Tinieblas Jr. to form a group that became known as Los Junior Atómicos. Of the four only two of them were actually sons of the wrestlers they took the name of, Tinieblas Jr. (son of Tinieblas) and Blue Demon Jr. (Son of Blue Demon). The remaining two were billed more as "successors" and not actually children of Máscara Sagrada and Halcón Dorado. During a tag team match earlier in 1996 a Blue Demon Jr. dive onto Karis La Momia ("Karis the Mummy") ended badly, with the storyline being that the dive injured Karis, causing him to grab a char and attack Blue Demon Jr. during the match. The storyline soon saw Karis la Momoa recruit Los Payasos ("The Clowns"; Coco Rojo, Coco Verde and Coco Amarillo) a trio of "Evil clowns". which brought out Blue Demon Jr.'s fellow Junior Atómicos to even the odds. On May 15, 2015 Karis defeated Blue Demon Jr. to win the Mexican National Cruiserweight Championship during a show Naucalpan, Mexico State.

Over the years AAA had recognized a large number of championships, including championships created by other Mexican wrestling promotions such as the Universal Wrestling Association (UWA) and the World Wrestling Association (WWA). At one point they created the IWC World Heavyweight Championship, intended to be AAA's top title, but it was never considered a prestigious as such. In 1996 AAA tried to clarify their championship rankings a bit by holding a one-night tournament where any champion was eligible to compete for the AAA Campeón de Campeones Championship. AAA decided to hold an eight-man Elimination match at Triplemanía IV-B to determine the first Campeón de Campeones

Champions participating in the Campeón de Campeones Championship match

- Juventud Guerrera - WWA World Welterweight Champion, Mexican National Tag Team Champion
- Konnan - AAA Americas Heavyweight Champion
- El Pantera - May have been the WWA Middleweight Champion at the time (Note: Records are unclear if Pantera held the title in June or did not win it until August, the August date may have been a title defense instead.)
- Perro Aguayo - WWA World Heavyweight Champion
- Pierroth Jr. - Mexican National Heavyweight Champion
- Pimpinela Escarlata - Mexican National Light Heavyweight Champion
- Psicosis - Mexican National Tag Team Champion
- Villano III - AAA Americas Trios Champion

== Aftermath ==
Los Junior Atómicos faced off against Karis la Momia and Los Payasos in the main event of Triplemanía IV-C a month later in a steel cage match. The stipulation was that the last person in the cage would be forced to unmask as the match would be contested under Lucha de Apuestas, or "bet match" rules. In the end Halcón Dorado Jr. was forced to unmask as Karis La Momia was able to escape the cage. After unmasking and revealing his real name Halcón Dorado Jr. attacked his fellow Junior Atómicos with a chair as he felt that they had left him in the cage to lose. With Dorado Jr.'s unmasking and betrayal the storyline with Karis la Momia and Los Payasos ended. Approximately six months later Los Junior Atómicos introduced a new member, La Parka Jr., who was in fact Karis La Momia under a new mask and identity.

Following his Campeón de Campeones loss Konnan sought to get revenge on Pierroth Jr., challenging him to a Dog collar match at the subsequent Triplemanía IV-C show. Pierroth Jr. won the match, which turned out to be Konnan's last match at a major AAA event for eight years. By the fall of 1996 Konnan and a number of other AAA wrestlers broke away from AAA as they wanted to present shows that were more hardcore wrestling style of show inspired by Extreme Championship Wrestling out of Philadelphia, Pennsylvania, something AAA owner Antonio Peña was not in favor of. Just like Peña had left Consejo Mundial de Lucha Libre with a number of younger wrestlers, very talented leaving with him in 1992 Konnan took a large number of AAA's younger, talented wrestlers with him when he left the company in the fall of 1996.

== Reception ==
In a 2000 article about the history of the Triplemanía up until that point Canadian Online Explorer wrestling writer John Molinario stated that the overall booking of the Triplemanía IV shows was "uninspired and repetitive. Pena recycled old angles that no longer registered with his audience." Wrestling commentator and lucha libre expert Mike Tenay noted that "Pena's poor promotional background and track record finally haunted him" stating that at this point AAA no longer had the big name stars to overcome the lack of advertising from AAA's side. Wrestling Observer Newsletter editor Dave Meltzer noted that by 1996 the Triplemanía show became "just a name for a bigger than average house show rather than the first year where it was like a WrestleMania."

== Results ==
No.	Results	Stipulations
1	Los Cadetes del Espacio (Ludxor, Venum, Boomerang, Thunderbird and Frisbee) defeated Ravana, Black Cat II, El Duende, Espectro, and El Picudo	Eight-man "Atómicos" tag team match
2	Latin Lover, Sergio Romo Jr., and Antifaz defeated Jerry Estrada, El Sanguinario, and Arandu	Six-man "Lucha Libre rules" tag team match
3	Rey Misterio Jr., Oro Jr., Winners, and Super Caló defeated Perro Silva, Halloween, Kraken, and Mosco de la Merced.	Eight-man "Atómicos" tag team match
4	Los Junior Atómicos (Máscara Sagrada Jr., Tinieblas Jr., Blue Demon Jr., and Halcón Dorado Jr.) defeated Los Payasos (Coco Rojo, Coco Verde and Coco Amarillo) and Karis la Momia by disqualification	Eight-man "Atómicos" tag team match
5	Pierroth Jr. defeated Perro Aguayo, Juventud Guerrera, Konnan, El Pantera, Pimpinela Escarlata, Psicosis and Villano III	Elimination match for the vacant AAA Campeón de Campeones Championship
6	La Parka, Octagón, and Máscara Sagrada defeated Killer, Cien Caras, and Heavy Metal	Lumberjack match
