= Triplemanía IV-A =

1996 Lucha Libre AAA World Wide event

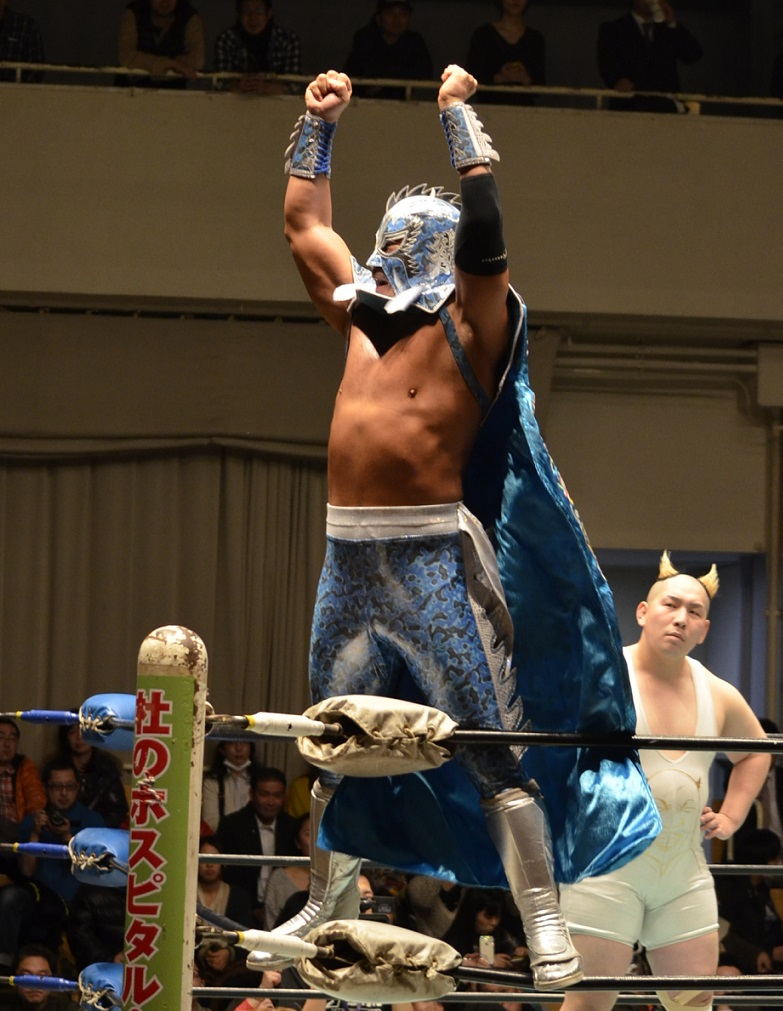
- Japanese wrestler Último Dragón working his first Triplemanía show
- Promotion: Asistencia Asesoría y Administración
- Date: May 11, 1996
- City: Chicago, Illinois, United States
- Venue: International Amphitheatre
- Attendance: 2,676

Triplemanía chronology
← Previous; III-C	Next → IV-B

Triplemanía IV-A was a major professional wrestling, show promoted by the Mexican-based Asistencia Asesoría y Administración (AAA) and was the first of three Triplemanía IV shows held in 1996. The event took place on May 11, 1996 at the International Amphitheatre in Chicago, Illinois, United States and marked the first time AAA held a Triplemanía outside of Mexico and one of the few times Triplemanía was an international event. The annual Triplemanía show(s) are AAA's biggest show of the year, serving as the culmination of major storylines and feature wrestlers from all over the world competing in what has been described as AAA's version of WrestleMania or their Super Bowl event.

The main event featured a Lumberjack match between the team of Konnan and Perro Aguayo fighting Pierroth, Jr. and Cien Caras. The under card featured a guest appearance by Japanese wrestler Último Dragón, who had begun a tour of Mexico weeks before the show, teaming up with Octagón and La Parka to lose to Cibernético, El Picudo and Mosco de la Merced in a traditional best two-out-of-three falls six-man "Lucha Libre rules" tag team match. The show only featured two additional matches, making it the Triplemanía show with the fewest matches.

== Production ==
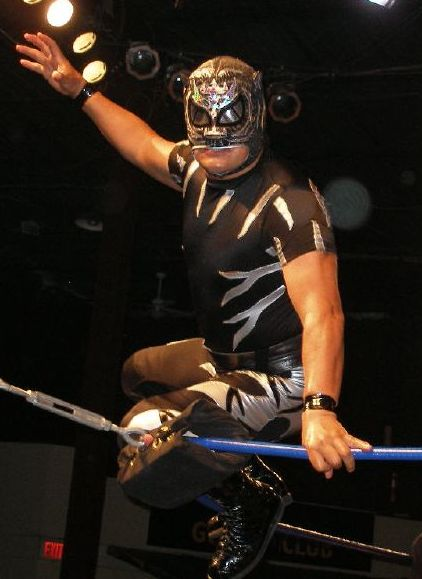
Pantera, one of only 20 wrestlers to work the show.

=== Background ===
Just like in 1994 and 1995 AAA planned out three Triplemanía events in 1994, the first slated for May 11, the Second Triplemanía IV show was booked for June 15 in Orizaba, Veracruz and the Third Triplemanía IV on July 15 in Madero. AAA promoter Antonio Peña wanted to expand AAA into the United States, building on the success they had so far in both Los Angeles and Chicago up to that point and the first Triplemanía IV would take place in Chicago at the International Amphitheatre, a building with a capacity to hold 9,000 people for most events. The show in Chicago was filled with a number of behind the scenes problems that plagued the event. AAA had chosen exactly the same date for the show as the wedding of Óscar Gutiérrez, one of AAA"s top stars known under the ring name Rey Misterio Jr., which meant that both he and his best man Dionicio Castellanos, better known as Psicosis would not be able to work the show. Despite the two not being able to work the show AAA still promoted them for the show. AAA was also adverting that Eddie Guerrero would appear on the show, but Guerrero was working in Japan at the time and was never contacted to be part of the show. The local event promoters in Chicago that AAA had partnered with did not do a very good job of promoting the event either, leading to only 2,676 people showing up for the event, filing less than one-third of all the seats in the Amphitheater. The attendance was the second lowest in the history of Triplemanía, with only Triplemanía VIII having a lower attendance number, 1,700 but took place in the much smaller Korakuen Hall with a capacity of around 2,000. The show was reportedly hit with a number of "no shows" beyond Rey Misterio Jr. and Psicosis, which caused AAA to have to rebook the entire event on the night of the show. In total only 20 wrestlers worked the show, the lowest number of wrestlers to ever appear at a Triplemanía show at that point. It is not clear if the show was taped for later broadcast or not, but no footage from this particular show has ever been shown, making it the only Triplemanía not to be accessible to anyone outside of the arena.

=== Storylines ===
The Triplemanía show featured four professional wrestling matches with different wrestlers involved in pre-existing scripted feuds, plots and storylines. Wrestlers were portrayed as either heels (referred to as rudos in Mexico, those that portray the "bad guys") or faces (técnicos in Mexico, the "good guy" characters) as they followed a series of tension-building events, which culminated in a wrestling match or series of matches.

== Reception ==
In a 2000 article about the history of the Triplemanía up until that point Canadian Online Explorer wrestling writer John Molinario described the show as "the worst show in TripleMania history". He also stated that the overall booking of the Triplemanía IV shows was "uninspired and repetitive. Pena recycled old angles that no longer registered with his audience." Wrestling commentator and lucha libre expert Mike Tenay noted that "Chicago was a joke, a real disaster" and that " Pena's poor promotional background and track record finally haunted him" stating that at this point AAA no longer had the big name stars to overcome the lack of advertising from AAA's side. Wrestling Observer Newsletter editor Dave Meltzer noted that by 1996 the Triplemanía show became "just a name for a bigger than average house show rather than the first year where it was like a WrestleMania."

== Results ==
No.	Results	Stipulations	Times
1	Karis la Momia, Arunyo, and Killer defeated Blue Demon Jr., El Torero, and Máscara Sagrada Jr.: Fall One: Torero pinned Karis la Momia and Máscara Sagráda, Jr. pinned Aruny (1-0); Fall Two: Karis la Momia forced Máscara Sagráda, Jr. to submit and Killer forced Torero to submit (1-1); Fall Three: Killer pinned Blue Demon, Jr. (2-1)	Best two-out-of-three falls six-man "Lucha Libre rules" tag team match	14:00
2	Jerry Estrada and Juventud Guerrera defeated El Pantera and Super Caló: Fall One: Super Calo pinned Juventud Guerrera (1-0); Fall Two: Juventud Guerrera pinned Super Caló (1-1); Fall Three: Juventud Guerrera pinned La Pantera (1-1)	Best two-out-of-three falls tag team match	20:00
3	Cibernético, El Picudo and Mosco de la Merced defeated Octagón, Último Dragón and La Parka: Fall One: Octagón, Último Dragón, and La Parka won the first fall (1-0); Fall Two: Octagón submitted and Mosco de la Merced pinned Último Dragón (1-1); Fall Three: El Picudo pinned Último Dragón and Cibernético pinned Octagón (2-1)	Best two-out-of-three falls six-man "Lucha Libre rules" tag team match	23:00
4	Konnan and Perro Aguayo defeated Pierroth Jr. and Cien Caras	Lumberjack match	17:00
