= Rey de Reyes (2012) =

2012 Lucha Libre AAA World Wide event

- Promotional poster featuring various AAA wrestlers
- Promotion: AAA
- Date: March 18, 2012
- City: Zapopan, Jalisco
- Venue: Auditorio Benito Juárez
- Attendance: 7,700

Event chronology
← Previous; Guerra de Titanes	Next → Triplemanía XX

Rey de Reyes chronology
← Previous; 2011	Next → 2013

Rey de Reyes (Spanish for "King of Kings") was a professional wrestling event produced by the AAA promotion, which took place on March 18, 2012, at Auditorio Benito Juárez in Zapopan, Jalisco, Mexico. The event was the 16th event produced under the Rey de Reyes name and also the 16th time that the Rey de Reyes tournament was held.

== Production ==
=== Background ===
Starting in 1997 and every year since then the Mexican Lucha Libre, or professional wrestling, company AAA has held a Rey de Reyes (Spanish for "King of Kings') show in the spring. The 1997 version was held in February, while all subsequent Rey de Reyes shows were held in March. As part of their annual Rey de Reyes event AAA holds the eponymious Rey de Reyes tournament to determine that specific year's Rey. Most years the show hosts both the qualifying round and the final match, but on occasion the qualifying matches have been held prior to the event as part of AAA's weekly television shows. The traditional format consists of four preliminary rounds, each a Four-man elimination match with each of the four winners face off in the tournament finals, again under elimination rules. There have been years where AAA has employed a different format to determine a winner. The winner of the Rey de Reyes tournament is given a large ornamental sword to symbolize their victory, but is normally not guaranteed any other rewards for winning the tournament, although some years becoming the Rey de Reyes has earned the winner a match for the AAA Mega Championship. From 1999 through 2009 AAA also held an annual Reina de Reinas ("Queen of Queens") tournament, but later turned that into an actual championship that could be defended at any point during the year, abandoning the annual tournament concept. The 2012 show was the 16th Rey de Reyes show in the series.

=== Storylines ===
The Rey de Reyes show featured seven professional wrestling matches with different wrestlers involved in pre-existing, scripted feuds, plots, and storylines. Wrestlers were portrayed as either heels (referred to as rudos in Mexico, those that portray the "bad guys") or faces (técnicos in Mexico, the "good guy" characters) as they followed a series of tension-building events, which culminated in a wrestling match or series of matches.

AAA's previous major event, Guerra de Titanes, on December 16, 2011, ended with Máscara Año 2000 Jr., El Texano Jr. and Toscano making their debuts and forming the rudo stable El Consejo, with the three posing as invaders from rival promotion Consejo Mundial de Lucha Libre (CMLL). Before the end of the year, El Consejo established themselves as the third major group, outside of both AAA and La Sociedad, by attacking both técnicos and rudos. On January 21, 2012, former CMLL wrestlers Mortiz and Semental turned on AAA and joined El Consejo, becoming its fourth and fifth member. On February 10, Real Fuerza Aérea member and former CMLL wrestler Argos turned on his real-life brother Argenis and helped El Consejo beat down members of his former stable. Later that same day, El Consejo approached El Hijo del Perro Aguayo, the leader of Los Perros del Mal and another former CMLL wrestler, and pointed out that since Los Perros had originated in "El Consejo", the two groups should join forces. However, Aguayo refused the offer, pointing out that El Consejo had attacked his stablemate Halloween back in December, eventually leading to a brawl between the two rudo stables. During February, the storyline continued with El Consejo first invading AAA offices and then hacking the promotion's official website, which eventually led to AAA president Marisela Peña Roldán agreeing to give the group a match at Rey de Reyes. On February 23, it was announced that at Rey de Reyes, El Consejo would face a team led by Dr. Wagner Jr. in a six man tag team match and if the invaders were defeated, they would be banned from all future AAA events. On March 11 at the final television tapings before Rey de Reyes, El Consejo was joined by a masked man using the character of "El Hombre de Negro" ("The Man in Black"), which was previously used by CMLL executive director and a member of the promotion's booking committee, Juan Manuel Mar.

The Rey de Reyes show featured the finals of the annual Rey de Reyes tournament. In the first round of the tournament, sixteen wrestlers were divided into four four-way elimination matches, with the winners meeting each other at Rey de Reyes in another four-way elimination match. The tournament started on February 23, when Los Perros del Mal member Héctor Garza defeated Heavy Metal, Joe Líder and Toscano, scoring the last elimination over Toscano, when members of El Consejo attacked Garza and caused a disqualification. Later that same night, El Hijo del Perro Aguayo defeated Cibernético, Máscara Año 2000 Jr. and a surprise entrant, the returning Juventud Guerrera, with help from interfering Garza, who attacked Máscara Año 2000 Jr., and Chessman, who attacked Guerrera, following the orders of La Sociedad co-leader Konnan. Guerrera had left AAA in March 2009, after Guerrera suffered bruising and a broken nose in a backstage fight with Konnan and Jack Evans.

During the months between Guerra de Titanes and Rey de Reyes, Jack Evans and El Hijo del Perro Aguayo continued their rivalry, which had started the previous November. On December 20, 2011, Evans teamed with El Mesías to defeat Aguayo and Héctor Garza in a tag team match, once again pinning Aguayo for the win. The two teams had a rematch on January 21, 2012, where Aguayo pinned Evans for the win. Afterwards, Aguayo claimed that Evans had no heart and kept kicking him. After Evans repeatedly refused to stay down, Aguayo finally acknowledged his rival's guts and exited the ring. On February 3, Aguayo announced that he was tired of wrestling with Evans and declared that they would not meet again in the ring, unless Evans was able to defeat him. In the following tag team match, where Aguayo and Halloween faced Evans and Extreme Tiger, Aguayo's overconfidence eventually led to Evans pinning him for the win. On March 2, Evans defeated Chessman, El Texano Jr. and Nicho el Millonario to qualify for the finals of the Rey de Reyes tournament, scoring the last elimination over El Texano Jr., following interference from Dr. Wagner Jr., who was attacked by El Consejo earlier in the event. That same day, AAA Latin American Champion L.A. Park defeated Electroshock, La Parka and Silver King to earn the last remaining spot in the finals of the Rey de Reyes tournament and become the third member of Los Perros del Mal in the match. During the months between Guerra de Titanes and Rey de Reyes, Park continued to have problems with the rest of La Sociedad, especially Konnan, who was forced to pay a $300,000 fine for damages caused by Park's out-of-control behaviour. The situation escalated on March 2, when Park grabbed La Sociedad leader Dorian Roldán, after he was told to kiss Karen Jarrett's feet as an apology for the recent problems between him and Karen, the manager and wife of AAA Mega Champion and La Sociedad member Jeff Jarrett. However, the rest of La Sociedad quickly managed to separate Park from Roldán.

One of the top matches of Rey de Reyes, saw Jeff Jarrett defending the AAA Mega Championship against El Mesías, who earned the right for the challenge by defeating Jarrett's fellow Total Nonstop Action Wrestling (TNA) workers A.J. Styles and Rob Terry in back-to-back matches at Guerra de Titanes. In storyline, Jarrett, who has not made an appearance for AAA since Héroes Inmortales on October 9, 2011, would be forced to return to the promotion and defend his title by TNA president Dixie Carter, who claimed that the Jarretts were hurting TNA by their actions in Mexico.

The undercard of the event, featured a twelve person elimination steel cage match, where the last person left in the cage will either be shaved bald or unmasked. The match included three Mini-Estrellas (midget wrestlers), three male wrestlers, three female wrestlers and three exoticos (male wrestlers with transvestite characters). The undercard also featured Cibernético continuing his rivalry with La Parka by leading his Los Bizarros stable to a six man lumberjack match against a La Sociedad team, led by La Parka. The match was billed as the final battle in the rivalry, which started in November 2010.

== Event ==
=== Preliminary matches ===
The opening match of Rey de Reyes was a twelve-person steel cage Lucha de Apuestas Hairs vs. Masks match. The three male wrestlers entered into the match were Aero Star, Alan Stone, El Elegido, the three female wrestlers Faby Apache, La Hechicera and Sexy Star, the three Mini-Estrellas Mascarita Dorada, Mini Histeria, Octagóncito and finally the three exoticos Pimpinela Escarlata, Pasión Cristal and Yuriko. Pasión Cristal was the first person to escape the match and he was followed, in order, by La Hechicera, El Elegido, Octagóncito, Alan Stone, Aero Star, who jumped off the top of the cage onto the wrestlers standing outside of it, Mini Histeria, Mascarita Dorada, Yuriko and finally Faby Apache, leaving Pimpinela Escarlata, waging his hair, and Sexy Star, waging her mask, inside the cage. During the past months, the two had been involved in a storyline rivalry over the AAA Reina de Reinas Championship. Escarlata was the first to climb to the top of the cage, but was there met by Konnan, who hit him with a foreign object. Sexy Star took advantage of the situation and escaped the cage to save her mask. After the match, as a barber was shaving Escarlata's head, Sexy Star re-entered the cage and took some of his hair with her.

The second match featured four tag teams battling each other in a four-way match. The match started with a surprise return, when Chessman revealed his unannounced partner for the match, the returning Teddy Hart. The match also saw Extreme Tiger teaming up with Fénix, a replacement for an injured Daga, Joe Líder reuniting with his former Mexican Powers stablemate Juventud Guerrera, and Los Perros del Mal member Nicho el Millonario teaming up with Halloween, who had legitimately quit both Los Perros del Mal and its home promotion, Perros del Mal Producciones, the previous week, but had vowed to honor his prior commitments with AAA. Joe Líder and Juventud Guerrera went on to win the match, with Guerrera pinning Halloween with a Go to Sleep for the win.

In the third match, new AAA World Trios Champions Los Psycho Circus, who had won the title just seven days earlier, faced La Sociedad's Octagón, Silver King and Último Gladiador in a non-title match, picking up the win, when Murder Clown pinned Gladiador with a diving splash.

This was followed by an in-ring segment, where Jeff Jarrett, Karen Jarrett, Konnan and Dorian Roldán had a heated confrontation with L.A. Park, demanding an apology from him, which eventually led to Park attacking them, effectively finalizing his exit from La Sociedad.

The fourth match saw Los Bizarros of Cibernético, Billy el Malo and Escoria take on La Sociedad's La Parka, Dark Dragon and Tito Santana in a lumberjack match. At the end of the match, Octagón, one of the lumberjacks and the leader of La Sociedad sub-group La Milicia, who had earlier asked La Parka to take care of Dragon and Santana, two other members of La Milicia, entered the ring and hit Parka with a steel chair. Cibernético took advantage of the surprise turn and pinned his rival to win the long feud between the two. After the match, La Milicia continued their assault on Parka, which eventually led to Los Bizarros returning to the ring, chasing La Milicia away and saving their rival.

=== Main event matches ===
In the fifth match of the evening, El Consejo leader El Texano Jr. led his stablemates Máscara Año 2000 Jr. and Toscano to face Dr. Wagner Jr. and his fellow AAA loyalists, Electroshock and Heavy Metal, in a six man tag team match, where the invaders' AAA futures were on the line. Eventually El Consejo's newest member, El Hombre de Negro, interfered in the match and removed Wagner Jr.'s mask. As Wagner Jr. was covering his face, Máscara Año 2000 Jr. managed to roll him up for the win, picking the rudo stable their first win in AAA.

In the next match, Jack Evans faced three members of Los Perros del Mal, El Hijo del Perro Aguayo, Héctor Garza and L.A. Park, in the finals of the Rey de Reyes tournament, which was contested under elimination rules. The winner of the match would earn the right to challenge for the AAA Mega Championship during the next 12 months. During the match, Karen Jarrett appeared ringside and distracted L.A. Park. As Park left the ring to go after Karen, Jeff Jarrett showed up and hit him with his signature weapon, a guitar, which led to Garza pinning him for the first elimination of the match. Despite being eliminated, Park managed to avenge his elimination by putting Garza through a table, which led to him being eliminated from the match by Evans, ending Los Perros del Mal's numbers advantage over the AAA representative. Down to just Aguayo and Evans, the match turned into a bloody brawl, which Aguayo in the end managed to win, following outside interference from Garza, scoring the deciding pinfall after utilizing the illegal Martinete maneuver. El Hijo del Perro Aguayo became the sixteenth Rey de Reyes and the second Aguayo to win the tournament as his father, Perro Aguayo, had won it in 1998.

Prior to the final match of the event, AAA remembered another former Rey de Reyes, Abismo Negro, who died on March 22, 2009.

In the main event of the evening, Jeff Jarrett defended the AAA Mega Championship against El Mesías. The match included outside interference from Jarrett's wife Karen, while Jarrett himself took Extreme Tiger, who accompanied El Mesías to the ring, out of the match by smashing a guitar on his head. Jarrett gained control of the match by handcuffing his opponent to the ring ropes, however, the resulting beatdown gave him only a two count. As Jarrett went to hit El Mesías with another guitar, L.A. Park entered the ring, took the guitar away from him, hit him with a DDT and kicked the guitar over to El Mesías. The challenger gained control of the guitar, hit Jarrett with it and then pinned him with a Mesías Splash to become the new AAA Mega Champion. El Mesías won the title for the record-setting fourth time, while Jarrett's reign of 274 days set the record for the longest reign in the history of the title.

=== Aftermath ===
Despite being saved by Cibernético, La Parka refused to forgive his rival, saying he had not forgotten what Los Bizarros had put him and his family through during the past year. Parka also tried to keep his alliance with La Sociedad alive, asking Dorian Roldán to resolve his situation with Octagón. Octagón explained the turn by claiming that Parka had put Dark Dragon and Tito Santana in danger by becoming more focused on his rivalry with Cibernético than the mutual goals of La Sociedad. At the March 30 and April 1 tapings, Jack Evans seemingly shifted from feuding with El Hijo del Perro Aguayo to Teddy Hart, who was named the newest member of Los Perros del Mal, while Aguayo himself went on to attack and challenge AAA Mega Champion El Mesías. During the weeks following Rey de Reyes, Dr. Wagner Jr. developed a rivalry with the man who pinned him at the event, Máscara Año 2000 Jr.

== Results ==
No.	Results	Stipulations
1	Sexy Star defeated Pimpinela Escarlata; Also in the match: Aero Star, Alan Stone, El Elegido, Faby Apache, La Hechicera, Mascarita Dorada, Mini Histeria, Octagóncito, Pasión Cristal and Yuriko	Twelve-person elimination steel cage Lucha de Apuestas; the last person left in the cage would either be shaved bald or unmasked
2	Joe Líder and Juventud Guerrera defeated Extreme Tiger and Fénix, Halloween and Nicho el Millonario and La Sociedad (Chessman and Teddy Hart)	Four-way tag team match
3	Los Psycho Circus (Monster Clown, Murder Clown and Psycho Clown) (with Mini Clown) defeated La Sociedad (Octagón, Silver King and Último Gladiador)	Six man tag team match
4	Los Bizarros (Billy el Malo, Cibernético and Escoria) defeated La Sociedad (Dark Dragon, La Parka and Tito Santana)	Lumberjack match
5	El Consejo (Máscara Año 2000 Jr., El Texano Jr. and Toscano) defeated Ejército AAA (Dr. Wagner Jr., Electroshock and Heavy Metal)	Six-man tag team match
6	El Hijo del Perro Aguayo defeated Héctor Garza, Jack Evans and L.A. Park	Rey de Reyes final four-way elimination match
7	El Mesías (with Extreme Tiger) defeated Jeff Jarrett (c) (with Karen Jarrett and Tito Santana)	Singles match for the AAA Mega Championship
(c) / – the champion(s) heading into the match

=== Tournament bracket ===
1st Round; AAA; February 23 – March 2, 2012
Heavy Metal	—
Héctor Garza	Win (Note: This was a four-way elimination match.) (Note: Order of elimination: Heavy Metal, Joe Lider, Toscano by disqualification)
Joe Lider	—
Toscano	—
Cibernético	—
Juventud Guerrera	—
Máscara Año 2000 Jr.	—
El Hijo del Perro Aguayo	Win (Note: Order of elimination: Máscara Año 2000 Jr., Juventud Guerrera, Cibernético)
Chessman	—
El Texano Jr.	—
Jack Evans	Win
Nicho el Millonario	—
Electroshock	—
L.A. Park	Win
La Parka	—
Silver Cain	—

Final; Sin Limite: Rey de Reyes; March 18, 2012 (Aired: March 25)
Héctor Garza	—
El Hijo del Perro Aguayo	Win (Note: Order of elimination: L.A. Park, Héctor Garza, Jack Evans)
Jack Evans	12:52
L.A. Park	—
