= Latin Lover (wrestler) =

Mexican Luchador and actor (born 1967)

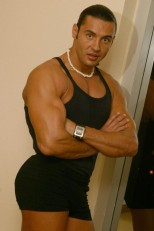

Personal information
- Born: Victor Manuel Resendiz Ruiz; October 25, 1967 (age 58) Monterrey, Nuevo León, Mexico

Professional wrestling career
- Ring name(s): Latin Lover; Latino
- Billed height: 1.85 m (6 ft 1 in)
- Billed weight: 98 kg (216 lb)
- Billed from: Monterrey, Nuevo León
- Trained by: El Vasco; Blue Fish; Katsuhisa Shibata
- Debut: June 7, 1992

Victor Manuel Resendiz Ruiz (born October 25, 1967) is a Mexican professional wrestler and actor. He is best known under his ring name Latin Lover, under which he is also credited in his acting career. Resendiz is best known for wrestling in the Mexican Lucha Libre AAA World Wide (AAA) promotion, but has also worked for the World Wrestling Federation (WWF), the Perros del Mal and Consejo Mundial de Lucha Libre (CMLL) promotions under the ring name Latino. Resendiz and his partner Mariana Vallejo Isrrade won the first Bailando por un Sueño dance competition in 2005.

== Professional wrestling career ==
Victor Manuel Resendiz Ruiz made his professional wrestling debut in 1992 at Arena Solidaridad in his home town of Monterrey, Nuevo León, Mexico, facing the team of Comando Ruso, Hijo del Solitario and Canadian Butcher. Resendiz debuted under the ring name "Latin Lover", a name he has used ever since. Originally Latin Lover was an enmascarado, or masked character, but he lost the match in a Luchas de Apuesta (bet match) against the team of Sangre Chicana and El Sanguinario on August 1, 1992. Lover and Espacial were close to win against the rudos as they made Chicana submit, but El Sanguinario was able to defeat both of them to score an upset win. After the loss of the mask Latin Lover worked briefly for Consejo Mundial de Lucha Libre (CMLL) and on various shows on the Mexican independent circuit. In 1994 he signed a contract to join Asistencia Asesoría y Administración, later simply AAA and soon became a featured wrestler on the mid-card. Latin Lover was quickly teamed up with another charismatic young wrestler by the name of Heavy Metal and together they won the Mexican National Tag Team Championship from Los Destructores (Tony Arce and Volcano) on September 9, 1994. The team held the title for 82 days before losing it to Fuerza Guerrera and Juventud Guerrera on December 2, 1994. After failing to regain the titles Latin Lover began teaming with Panterita del Ring instead, defeating Los Guerreras for the tag team title on June 1, 1995. Lover and Panterita successfully defended the title against Los Guerreras and Blue Panther and Heavy Metal before losing the titles back to Los Guerreras on September 18, 1995. While Latin Lover had a limited repertoire when it came to wrestling, his good looks and dance moves made him a favorite with the fans, especially the women in the audience, keeping him high in the AAA rankings. On September 9, 1996 Latin Lover won the Mexican National Light Heavyweight Championship by defeating Pimpinela Escarlata. He was also a participant in the 1997 Royal Rumble. On February 15, 1997 Latin Lover defeated Pierroth, Jr. to become a double champion as he won the AAA Campeón de Campeones Championship. On February 21, 1997 Latin Lover defeated Máscara Sagráda, Jr., Jerry Estrada and Killer to earn a spot in the finals of the 1997 Rey de Reyes tournament. Lover went on to defeat Heavy Metal, Héctor Garza and Octagón to win the tournament and become the 1997 Rey de Reyes (Spanish for "King of Kings") On May 12, 1997 Cibernético defeated him to win the Campeon de Campeones title. Three days later Latin Lover also lost the Mexican Light Heavyweight title after 252 days with the title. In late 1999 Latin Lover would win both the Mexican National Heavyweight Championship and regain the Mexican National Light Heavyweight Championship, becoming a double champion once again. He only held the Light Heavyweight title for 105 days before losing it to Sangre Chicana on February 1, 2000. Due to nagging knee injuries Latin Lover's schedule in 2000 and 2001 slowed down to only select appearances. On May 5, 2002 – 929 days after winning the title Latin Lover finally lost the Mexican National Heavyweight Championship to Héctor Garza. On March 21, 2003, he received a match against NWA World Heavyweight Champion Jeff Jarrett but lost to him in Mexico City. The match came about as a result of a working relationship between AAA and Total Nonstop Action Wrestling (TNA) and Latin Lover was chosen to represent AAA on the card.

== Non-wrestling career and retirement ==
In 2005 Resendiz, officially billed as Latin Lover on the show, competed in and won the inaugural Bailando por un Sueño dance tournament with his partner Mariana Vallejo Isrrade. The win led to Latin Lover becoming a household name in Mexico, leading to more acting parts both on television and on stage. Resendiz appeared in the telenovela Velo de Novia ("The Bridal Veil") and on stage and TV as part of the Sólo para Mujeres ("For Women Only") dance/stripping group. During a stage performance Resendiz performed a dive off the stage and injured his knee, tearing the anterior cruciate ligament (ACL) in his knee. On January 26, 2006 Resendiz announced that he had to retire from wrestling due to this injury and that he was scheduled for what would be the eighth knee surgery since his debut in 1992. In 2010 Latin Lover was selected to represent Mexico as one of the Juries on Second Dance World Championship. Resendiz appeared in the telenovela Qué bonito amor and La tempestad.

== Return to professional wrestling ==
In late 2008, Latin Lover returned to wrestling, initially teasing that he would join the CMLL based group Los Perros del Mal, but in the end returned to AAA. At the Rey de Reyes (2009) tournament on March 15, 2009, he defeated Abismo Negro, Black Abyss and Dark Ozz to qualify for the final. In the final he was the last wrestler eliminated by the 2009 Rey de Reyes Electroshock. Following the Rey de Reyes tournament Latin Lover began teaming with Marco Corleone, a wrestler with a similar "ladies man" character. The team challenged AAA World Tag Team Champions La Hermandad Extrema (Spanish for "The Extreme Brotherhood"; Nicho el Milinario and Joe Líder) in one of the featured events at Triplemania XVII, only to lose due to miscommunication between Latin Lover and Corleone. On March 18, 2010, AAA announced in a press conference that they would no longer be booking Latin Lover, due to monetary issues and him no-showing the 2010 Rey de Reyes event where he was scheduled to be part of the main event. On April 11 Perros del Mal announced that Latin Lover would be joining the promotion and debuting the following month. On June 4, 2010, Latin Lover returned to Consejo Mundial de Lucha Libre, brawling with Héctor Garza. After not appearing again for CMLL for months, Latin Lover returned to the promotion on November 26, 2010, confronting Los Invasores, a rudo group led by Garza. He was then attacked by the group, before being saved by Shocker. Upon returning to the promotion, Resendiz adopted the new ring name of Latino.

== Legal actions against AAA ==
In early April, 2010 ex-AAA wrestlers Histeria and El Alebrije sought legal action against AAA over the issues of name and ring character ownership as well as unfair termination by AAA. The two claim that they have wrestled for 13 years to create the characters and thus own them. The parties met in Mexico City's Board of Conciliation and Arbitration to see if a settlement can be reached or if the matter will be taken to court. The parties met for a second arbitration meeting in late April, 2010. This time the plaintiff group was joined by Latin Lover who, like Alebrije, Histeria and the others, claimed that he should be allowed to use the ring name on the independent circuit since he's worked as Latin Lover for 18 years and thus should be allowed to continue using it. After the meeting it was stated that all parties involved were cooperating over the matter.

== Filmography ==
Film
Year	Title	Role	Notes
2018	Roma	Profesor Zovek	

Year	Television	Role	Notes
2003	Velo de novia	Latin	
2006	¡Qué madre, tan padre!	Técnico	Episode: "Análisis estratégicos"
2009	Hermanos y detectives		Episode: "Muerte en escena"
2012	Por ella soy Eva	Gino / Maximiliano Montes	Episode: "Huye de la policía"
2013	Qué bonito amor	Jairo	Supporting Role
2014	La Tempestad	El Oso	Supporting Role
2015–2017	Como dice el dicho	Fabián; Israel; Entrenador	Episode: "El que la sigue la consigue" Episode: "No hay peor lucha que la que no se hace" Episode: "Quien mucho abarca, poco aprieta" Episode: "El que demonios da, demonios recibe"
2017–2019	Mi marido tiene familia	Enzo	Recurring Role Seasons 1-2

== Championships and accomplishments ==
- AAA
  - AAA Campeón de Campeones Championship (1 time)
  - Mexican National Heavyweight Championship (1 time)
  - Mexican National Light Heavyweight Championship (1 time)
  - Mexican National Tag Team Championship (2 times) – with Heavy Metal (1) and Panterita del Ring (1)
  - Rey de Reyes: 1997
- Federación Internacional de Lucha Libre
  - FILL Light Heavyweight Championship (1 time)
- Pro Wrestling Illustrated
  - Ranked No. 46 of the top 500 singles wrestlers in the PWI 500 in 2004

== Luchas de Apuestas record ==
Winner (wager)	Loser (wager)	Location	Event	Date	Notes
Latin Lover (hair)	El Sanguinario (hair)	Monterrey, Nuevo León	Live event	Unknown	
Latin Lover (hair)	Pimpinela Escarlata (hair)	Monterrey, Nuevo León	Live event	Unknown	
Latin Lover (hair)	Winners (hair)	Monterrey, Nuevo León	Live event	Unknown	
Latin Lover (hair)	Fabuloso Blondy (hair)	Monterrey, Nuevo León	Live event	Unknown	
Latin Lover (hair)	Rick Patterson (hair)	Monterrey, Nuevo León	Live event	Unknown	
Latin Lover (hair)	Crazy 33 (hair)	Monterrey, Nuevo León	Live event	Unknown	
Latin Lover (hair)	Stuka (hair)	Monterrey, Nuevo León	Live event	June 1992	
Sangre Chicana and El Sanguinario (hair)	Latin Lover (hair) and Polimero Espacial (mask)	Monterrey, Nuevo León	Live event	August 1, 1992	
Latin Lover (hair)	Valente Fernández (hair)	Monterrey, Nuevo León	Live event	September 27, 1992	
Latin Lover (hair)	Arafath (mask)	Monterrey, Nuevo León	Live event	October 15, 1993	(Note: This was a triangle match that also included El Sanguinario.)
Latin Lover (hair)	El Signo (hair)	Naucalpan, Mexico State	Live event	May 1, 1994	
Latin Lover (hair)	El Sanguinario (hair)	Monterrey, Nuevo León	Live event	November 27, 1994	
Latin Lover (hair)	Babe Face (hair)	Tulancingo, Hidalgo	Live event	April 16, 1999	(Note: Parejas increibles: lost to Perro Aguayo and El Texano.)
Latin Lover (hair)	El Sanguinario (hair)	Monterrey, Nuevo León	Live event	July 18, 1999	(Note: Match also included Jerry Estrada and The Panther.)
Latin Lover (hair)	Pirata Morgan (hair)	Dallas, Texas	Live event	April 13, 2003	
Latin Lover (hair)	Misterioso (hair)	Tijuana, Baja California	Live event	October 17, 2003	
Latin Lover (hair)	Héctor Garza (hair)	Monterrey, Nuevo León	Live event	October 26, 2003	
Latin Lover (hair)	Pirata Morgan (hair)	Naucalpan, Mexico State	Guerra de Titanes	December 5, 2004	(Note: Steel cage match that also included Heavy Metal, Hator and La Fiera. Pirata Morgan interfered and was the last man in the cage.)
Latin Lover (hair)	Chessman (hair)	Naucalpan, Mexico State	Verano de Escándalo	September 18, 2005	(Note: Steel cage match that also included Cibernético and Shocker.)
