= AAA Campeón de Campeones Championship =

Professional wrestling championship

AAA Champion of Champions AAA Campeón de Campeones
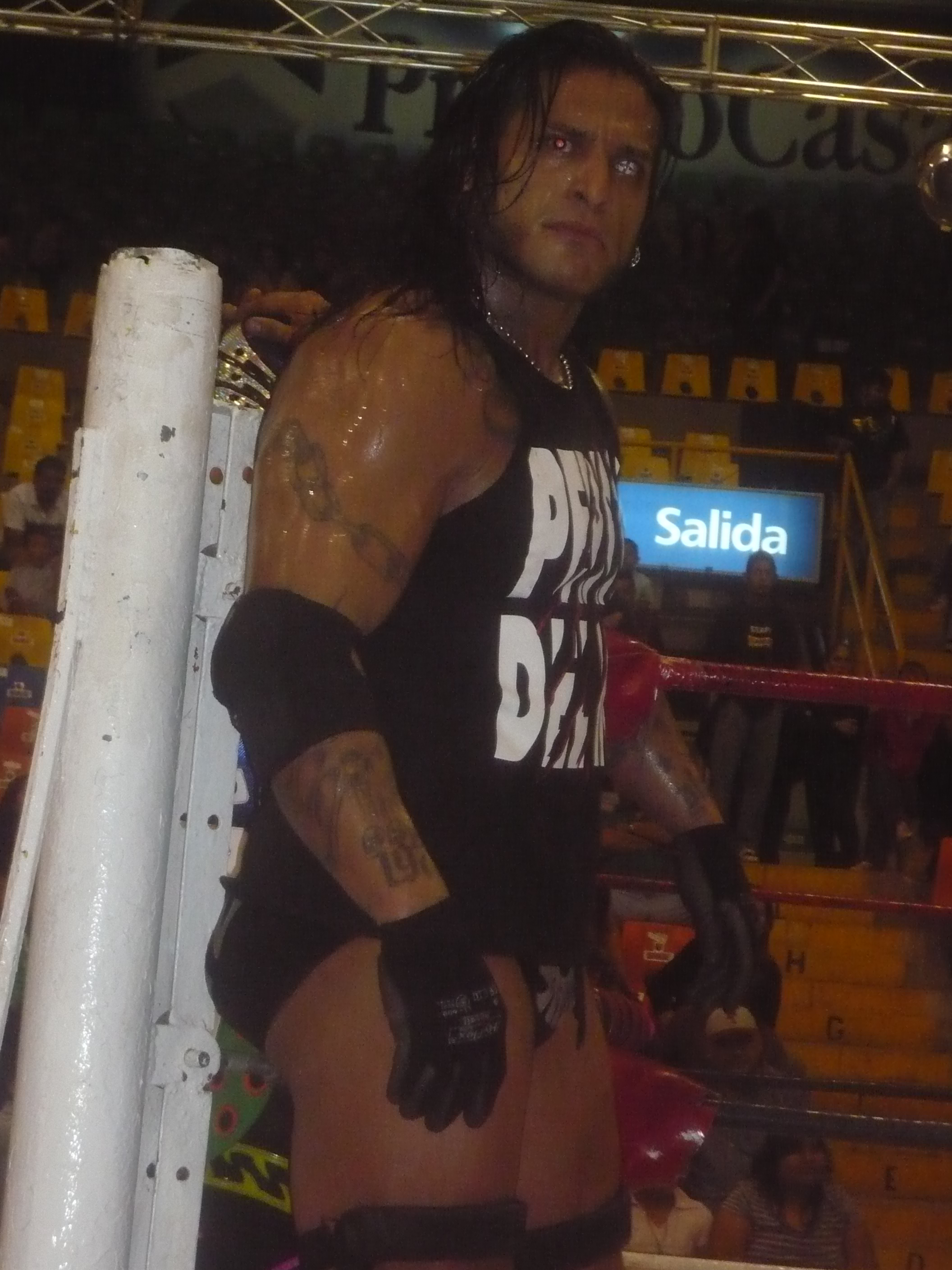
- Cibernético, the last Campeón de Campeones

Details
- Promotion: AAA
- Date established: June 15, 1996
- Date retired: After 2001
Statistics
- First champion: Pierroth, Jr.
- Final champions: Cibernético (won August 3, 2001)
- Most reigns: Cibernético (3)
- Longest reign: Cibernetico (Over 18 months)
- Shortest reign: Heavy Metal (33 days)

The AAA Campeón de Campeones (Spanish for "Champion of Champions") was a singles professional wrestling championship promoted by AAA between 1996 and 2005. Being a professional wrestling championship, it is not won legitimately; it is instead won via a scripted ending to a match or awarded to a wrestler because of a storyline. As the name of the title indicate, the Championship was created to be the highest ranking singles champion in AAA, the equivalent of a "World" title. This was AAA's second attempt at creating a "World" title, the previous being the IWC World Heavyweight Title which was created in 1993 and was the unofficial top title until the Campeón de Campeones title was created in 1996.

Pierroth, Jr. was the first Campeón de Campeones, winning a Torneo cibernetico over Perro Aguayo, Konnan, Juventud Guerrera, El Pantera, Pimpinela Escarlata, Psicosis and Villano III on June 15, 1996. There have been seven title reigns during the lifespan of the Championship, with only one man holding it more than once, Cibernético held it three times all together. The exact date the title was deactivated is uncertain, Cibernético won the title in 2001 and was promoted as the champion for some time after that, but by the time the AAA Mega Championship was created Cibernético had not been promoted as the Campeón de Campeones for a couple of years.

== Title history ==
Key
| No. | Overall reign number |
| Reign | Reign number for the specific champion |
| Days | Number of days held |
| N/A | Unknown information |

| No. | Champion | Championship change | | | Reign statistics | | Notes | Ref. |
| No. | Champion | Date | Event | Location | Reign | Days | Notes | Ref. |
|---|---|---|---|---|---|---|---|---|
Lucha Libre AAA Worldwide (AAA)
| 1 | Pierroth, Jr. | June 15, 1996 | Triplemanía IV-B | Orizaba, Veracruz | 1 | 245 | Last eliminated Konnan in a torneo cibernetico to win the Championship. | |
| 2 | Latin Lover | February 15, 1997 | AAA Sin Limite | Cuernavaca, Morelos | 1 | 293 | | |
| 3 | Cibernético | December 5, 1997 | AAA Sin Limite | Tijuana, Baja California | 1 | 65 | | |
| 4 | Perro Aguayo | February 8, 1998 | AAA Sin Limite | Chihuahua, Chihuahua | 1 | — | The exact date where Aguayo lost the title has not been documented, which means the length of his reign is unknown. | |
| 5 | Cibernético | 1998 | Live event | N/A | 2 | — | The exact date where Cibernético won the title has not been documented, which means the length of his reign is unknown | |
| 6 | Heavy Metal | June 30, 2001 | AAA Sin Limite | Hermosillo, Sonora | 1 | 34 | | |
| 7 | Cibernético | August 3, 2001 | Live event | N/A | 3 | — | The title has never officially been announced as inactive, it just stopped being promoted no later than 2005. | |
| — | Deactivated | 2001 | — | — | — | — | The title deactivated Sometime in 2001. | |
