= Arena Naucalpan 5th Anniversary Show =

1982 International Wrestling Revolution Group event

- Promotion: Promociones Moreno; Universal Wrestling Association
- Date: December 22, 1982
- City: Naucalpan, State of Mexico
- Venue: Arena Naucalpan

Event chronology
← Previous; Arena Naucalpan 4th Anniversary Show	Next → Arena Naucalpan 6th Anniversary Show

Arena Naucalpan Anniversary Show chronology
← Previous; 4th Anniversary	Next → 6th Anniversary

The Arena Naucalpan 5th Anniversary Show was a major annual professional wrestling event produced and scripted by Promociones Moreno in conjunction with the professional wrestling promotion the Universal Wrestling Association (UWA), which took place on December 22, 1982, in Arena Naucalpan, Naucalpan, State of Mexico, Mexico. As the name implies the show celebrated the 5th Anniversary of the construction of Arena Naucalpan, Promociones Morenos main venue, in 1977. In 1996 Promociones Moreno became International Wrestling Revolution Group (IWRG), maintaining the annual Arena Naucalpan Anniversary tradition. The show became IWRG's longest-running show and is the fourth oldest, still held, annual show in professional wrestling.

The show featured four matches in total with the main event being a Best two-out-of-three-falls six-man tag team match between two of the top trios in the UWA at the time. In the main event Los Misioneros de la Muerte (The Missionaries of Death"; El Signo, Negro Navarro and El Texano) defeated Los Villanos ("The Villains"; Villano I, Villano II and Villano III).

== Production ==
=== Background ===
The location at Calle Jardín 19, Naucalpan Centro, 53000 Naucalpan de Juárez, México, Mexico was originally an indoor roller rink for the locals in the late part of the 1950s known as "Cafe Algusto". By the early-1960s, the building was sold and turned into "Arena KO Al Gusto" and became a local lucha libre or professional wrestling arena, with a ring permanently set up in the center of the building. Promoter Adolfo Moreno began holding shows on a regular basis from the late 1960s, working with various Mexican promotions such as Empresa Mexicana de Lucha Libre (EMLL) to bring lucha libre to Naucalpan. By the mid-1970s the existing building was so run down that it was no longer suitable for hosting any events. Moreno bought the old build and had it demolished, building Arena Naucalpan on the same location, becoming the permanent home of Promociones Moreno. Arena Naucalpan opened its doors for the first lucha libre show on December 17, 1977. From that point on the arena hosted regular weekly shows for Promociones Moreno and also hosted EMLL and later Universal Wrestling Association (UWA) on a regular basis. In the 1990s the UWA folded and Promociones Moreno worked primarily with EMLL, now rebranded as Consejo Mundial de Lucha Libre (CMLL).

In late 1995 Adolfo Moreno decided to create his own promotion, creating a regular roster instead of relying totally on wrestlers from other promotions, creating the International Wrestling Revolution Group (IWRG; sometimes referred to as Grupo Internacional Revolución in Spanish) on January 1, 1996. From that point on Arena Naucalpan became the main venue for IWRG, hosting the majority of their weekly shows and all of their major shows as well. While IWRG was a fresh start for the Moreno promotion they kept the annual Arena Naucalpan Anniversary Show tradition alive, making it the only IWRG show series that actually preceded their foundation. The Arena Naucalpan Anniversary Show is the fourth oldest still ongoing annual show in professional wrestling, the only annual shows that older are the Consejo Mundial de Lucha Libre Anniversary Shows (started in 1934), the Arena Coliseo Anniversary Show (first held in 1943), and the Aniversario de Arena México (first held in 1957).

The Arena Naucalpan 5th Anniversary Show was organized by Alfonso Moreno and featured a large number of wrestlers from the Universal Wrestling Association (UWA), who allowed Moreno to book their wrestlers on a regular basis.

=== Storylines ===
The event featured 4 professional wrestling matches with different wrestlers involved in pre-existing scripted feuds, plots and storylines. Wrestlers were portrayed as either heels (referred to as rudos in Mexico, those that portray the "bad guys") or faces (técnicos in Mexico, the "good guy" characters) as they followed a series of tension-building events, which culminated in a wrestling match or series of matches.

In the early 1980s, the UWA was one of the driving forces behind making the trios (teams of three wrestlers) match format the most popular format in Mexico. The popularity had started with Los Misioneros de la Muerte ("The Missionaries of Death"; El Signo, Negro Navarro and El Texano), who are often credited with the rise of the trios concept in Mexico. Los Misionarios rise was partially due to an abundance of talented trios in the UWA such as Los Villanos (Villano I, Villano II and Villano III), Los Brazos ("The Arms"; El Brazo, Brazo de Oro and Brazo de Plata) and Los Fantásticos (Black Man, Kato Kung Lee and Kung Fu).

== Event ==
The celebrations of the fifth anniversary of Arena Naucalpan started with promoter Adolfo Moreno briefly addressing the crowd, thanking them for their support for the previous five years. The opening match was a tag team match, contested under best two-out-of-three-falls rules, which is the predominant match form in lucha libre. The rudo team of Lobo Rubio and Rams won the first fall, with Villano IV and Rokambole winning the second fall to tie the match up and go into the third and deciding fall. Around the twelve minute mark Villano IV pinned Rams to win the match for his side. The masked Brazos brothers (Brazo de Oro, Brazo de Plata and, El Brazo) were the crowd favorites as they fought against the trio of Black Terry, Fuerza Guerrera and Negro Casas, three wrestlers that did not normally teamed up. The team work of Los Brazos proved to be the deciding factor as El Brazo and Brazo de Oro ganged up on Negro Casas to defeat him in the third and deciding fall. The semi-main event featured the martial arts inspired duo Los Fantásticos (Kato Kung Lee and Kung Fu) wrestled the rudo team of Babe Face and Scorpio. Los Fantásticos won the match in three falls, winning the first fall by disqualification and the third and final fall when Kung Fu pinned Babe Face.

Ever since their involvement in the last match of El Santo, Los Misioneros de la Muerte (El Signo, Negro Navarro and El Texano) had been the top rudo trio in the UWA and headlined many shows across Mexico, often against Los Villanos (Villano I, Villano II and Villano III), who were the sons of UWA promoter Ray Mendoza and positioned as one of the top tecnico trios of the UWA. Los Misioneros who the first fall by cheating, which caused such a reaction from the crowd that the second fall did not commence until five minutes later to ensure there the fans did not riot. When Los Misioneros also won the third and deciding fall by cheating arena security quickly escorted them to the back, keeping the angry fans away from them.

== Aftermath ==
After the riots the State of Mexico boxing and wrestling commission did an investigation into the events that led to the near riot at the end of the show, raising the possibility that they could end up suspending Los Misioneros if they were found to have incited the riots. After interviewing arena officials, several wrestlers and fans in attendance they determined that Los Misioneros simply played their rudo role very well, but were not at fault for the events and thus no punishment was required.

In 1984 the UWA introduced the first ever Trios championship in Mexico as they introduced the UWA World Trios Championship, making Los Fantásticos their first champions as they won the inaugural tournament, defeating Los Cadetos del Espacio ("The Space Cadets"; El Solar, Super Astro and Ultraman). in the finals.

Rokambole, who appeared in the first match of the night teaming with Villano IV would soon be given a new ring name and mask, revealing that he was the brother of Villano I, II, III and IV, taking the name Villano V. It was later revealed that he was actually the fourth son of Ray Mendoza, but since he completed his college degree later than his younger brother he became "Villano V".

== Results ==
No.	Results	Stipulations
1	Rokambole and Villano IV defeated Lobo Rubio and Rams	Best two-out-of-three-falls tag team match
2	Los Brazos (Brazo de Oro, Brazo de Plata and, El Brazo) defeated Black Terry, Fuerza Guerrera and Negro Casas	Best two-out-of-three-falls six-man tag team match
3	Los Fantásticos (Kato Kung Lee and Kung Fu) defeated Babe Face and Scorpio	Best two-out-of-three-falls tag team match
4	Los Misioneros de la Muerte (El Signo, Negro Navarro and El Texano) defeated Los Villanos (Villano I, Villano II and Villano III)	Best two-out-of-three-falls six-man tag team match
