= WWA Tag Team Championship =

The WWA World Tag Team Championship may refer to:

- WWA World Tag Team Championship (Indianapolis version), tag team title defended in the Indianapolis-based World Wrestling Association from 1964 to 1989
- NWA Americas Tag Team Championship, tag team title defended in the Los Angeles-based World Wrestling Association from 1964 to 1968
- WWA Tag Team Championship (Mexico), tag team title defended in the Mexican lucha libre promotion World Wrestling Association
