= AAA Americas Trios Championship =

Professional wrestling championship

AAA Americas Trios Championship AAA Campeonato Trios de America
- The championship belt

Details
- Promotion: AAA
- Date established: March 8, 1996
- Date retired: 1997
Statistics
- First champions: Los Villanos (Villano III, Villano IV and Villano V)
- Longest reign: Los Villanos (256 days)
- Shortest reign: Los Oficiales (Guardia, Official and Vigilante) (42 days)

The AAA Americas Trios Championship was a six-man tag team title contested for in the Mexican lucha libre promotion AAA. The last recorded title defense for Los Villanos (Villano III, Villano IV and Villano V) was in 1997; no official announcement has been made but the title was quietly eliminated at some point after 1997 when Los Villanos stopped working for AAA. Being a professional wrestling championship, it was not won legitimately: it is instead won via a scripted ending to a match or awarded to a wrestler because of a storyline.

== Title history ==
Key
No.	Overall reign number
Reign	Reign number for the specific team—reign numbers for the individuals are in parentheses, if different
Days	Number of days held
N/A	Unknown information

No.	Champion	Championship change			Reign statistics		Notes	Ref.
No.	Champion	Date	Event	Location	Reign	Days	Notes	Ref.
Lucha Libre AAA Worldwide (AAA)
1	Los Villanos (Villano III, Villano IV and Villano V)	March 8, 1996	Live event	Nezahualcóyot, State of Mexico	1	256	Defeated Cien Caras, Heavy Metal and Latin Lover to become the first champions.	
2	Los Oficiales (Guardia, Oficial and Vigilante)	November 19, 1996	Live event	Naucalpan, State of Mexico	1	42		
3	Los Villanos (Villano III, Villano IV and Villano V)	1996	Live event	N/A	2	—	Los Villanos last recorded title defense was in 1997, no exact date of when the title was made defunct is recorded.	
—	Deactivated	1996 or 1997	—	—	—	—	The title deactivated Sometime in 1996 or 1997.	

== 1996 AAA American Trios Title Tournament ==
The tournament ran from February 3, 1996, to March 8, 1996, to crown the first AAA American Trios champions.

First Round
1	Principe Zafiro, Volador and Blue Demon, Jr.	W
16	Damien, Espectro (II) and Karis la Momia	L
8	Latin Lover, Winners and Heavy Metal	W
9	El Torrero, Tornado and El Mexicano	L
5	Los Payasos (Coco Rojo, Coco Azur and Coco Amarillo)	L
12	Frisbee, Máscara Sagrada and Tinieblas, Jr.	W
4	Los Villanos (Villano III, Villano IV and Villano V)	W
13	Los Destructores (Tony Arce, Rocco Valente and El Volcano)	L
6	Cien Caras, Latin Lover and Heavy Metal	W
11	Rey Misterio, Jr., La Parka and Frisbee	L
3	Yeti, the Killer and Vegas	W
14	Super Ráton, Super Muñeco and Super Rinochiro	L
7	Volador, El Mexicano and Halcon Dorado, Jr.	W
10	Gallego, El Bronco and Ricky Santana	L
2	Predator, Angel Satanico and Mr. Jack	L
15	Jerry Estrada, Cibernético and Pierroth, Jr.	W

Second Round
Principe Zafiro, Volador and Blue Demon, Jr.	L
Latin Lover, Winners and Heavy Metal	W
Frisbee, Mascara Sagrada and Tinieblas, Jr.	L
Los Villanos (Villano III, Villano IV and Villano V)	W
Cien Caras, Latin Lover and Heavy Metal	W
Yeti, the Killer and Vegas	L
Volador, Mexicano and Blue Demon, Jr.	L
Jerry Estrada, Cibernético and Pierroth, Jr.	W

Semi-Final
Latin Lover, Winners and Heavy Metal	L
Los Villanos (Villano III, Villano IV and Villano V)	W
Cien Caras, Latin Lover and Heavy Metal	W
Jerry Estrada, Cibernético and Pierroth, Jr.	L

Finals
Los Villanos (Villano III, Villano IV and Villano V)	W
Cien Caras, Latin Lover and Heavy Metal	L
