= Kung Fu (wrestler) =

Mexican professional wrestler (1951–2001)

Personal information
- Born: Raymundo Cuesta Veloz; January 20, 1951
- Died: January 3, 2001 (aged 49)

Professional wrestling career
- Ring name(s): Ray Acosta; El Estudiante; Kung Fu
- Billed height: 1.68 m (5 ft 6 in)
- Billed weight: 77 kg (170 lb)
- Trained by: El Duque; Rafael Salamanca
- Debut: 1968

Raymundo Acosta Veloz (January 20, 1951 – January 3, 2001) was a Mexican professional wrestler best known under the ring name Kung Fu. As Kung Fu he made a name for himself as part of Trio Fantásticos along with Kato Kung Lee and Black Man, a very popular tecnico (face or "good guys") trio in the early 1980s.

== Professional wrestling career ==
Raymundo Cuesta made his professional wrestling debut in 1968, using the ring name Ray Acosta, and generally working low card matches while gaining experience. On August 4, 1974 Cuesta lost a Luchas de Apuesta, or bet match, to Villano III and had his hair shaved off after the match per. Lucha libre traditions. In the early 1970s Cuesta adopted a new ring persona, an enmascarado (masked wrestler) character called El Estudiante (Spanish for "the Student"). In 1975 Cuesta changed ring characters once again, although he would reprise his role as "El Estudiante" from time to time.

Cuesta drew on his interest in martial arts and came up with the ring character "Kung Fu", an enmascarado inspired by the martial art and its practitioners. Cuesta had a black and orange mask created that would become his trademark for many years, he wore martial artist pants and jackets and started to incorporate various kicks and chops into his wrestling style. Kung Fu's debut match was a tag team match where he would team with El Santo against Ángel Blanco and Ray Mendoza, an indicator that the promoters were pushing the new character to the top of the card. His wrestling style of wrestling, martial arts and various comedic elements quickly earned Kung Fu a lot of fans. On September 26, 1977 Kung Fu defeated Fishman to win the Mexican National Welterweight Championship, holding the belt until November 23, 1977 when Fishman regained the title. Kung Fu regained the title from Fishman on April 2, 1978 and went on to hold it for six months before losing the title to Américo Rocca on December 10, 1978. Around the time of his title victory Kung Fu was teamed up with Kato Kung Lee, a Panamanian wrestler who used the same combination of wrestling and martial arts as Kung Fu did. Together the team won the Arena Coliseo Tag Team Championship at least two times. The team also won the masks of Los Jaliscos (Jalisco I and Jalisco II) in a Luchas de Apuestas, mask vs. mask match. In 1979 the team was joined by Satoru Sayama (the future "Tiger Mask"), forming a trio known as El Triangulo Oriental ("The Oriental Trio), despite only Sayama actually being from the orient.

In mid 1981 Kung Fu and Kato Kung Lee left Empresa Mexicana de Lucha Libre (EMLL) and joined the rival promotion Universal Wrestling Association (UWA). In the UWA Kung Fu and Kato began teaming with Black Man, forming a trio called Los Tres Fantásticos ("The Fantastic Three") that would soon become the top tecnico (Face or "good guy") trio of the UWA. Los Tres Fantásticos became the first ever UWA World Trios Championship on March 18, 1984 when they defeated Solar, Super Astro and Ultraman in the finals of a tournament to crown the first champions, during a time period where the UWA shows in El Toreo were the biggest drawing shows in Mexico. Kung Fu, Kato and Black Man lost the UWA Trios title at some point in 1984. In 1984/85 EMLL and the UWA ran a series of joint shows, sharing wrestlers between the two promotions, including Los Tres Fantásticos. When the cooperation ended Kung Fu decided to stay with EMLL, Black Man remained with the UWA and Kato Kung Lee began wrestling on the independent circuit, ending Los Tres Fantásticos. Several attempts to recreated the Fantásticos have been made since then, but none had the popularity of success of the original trio. On October 17, 1986 Kung Fu won the NWA World Middleweight Championship from Gran Cochisse, winning one of the top championships in all of Mexico. Kung Fu held the title for approximately 10 months before losing the title to El Dandy on July 17, 1987. Kung Fu regained the title on October 6, 1987 and held it until July 10, 1988 where he lost it to Atlantis. By the time Kung Fu lost the NWA title Kato Kung Lee had returned to EMLL, he had also turned rudo (Heel or "Bad guy") and lost his mask in a match against El Hijo del Santo. Kung Fu and Kato Kung Lee started a storyline feud, old partners who are now enemies. The feud between the two saw Kung Fu win two Luchas de Apuestas in 1988, both times causing Kato Kung Lee to be shaved bald after the match. In 1990 Kung Fu worked a feud with Atlantis, a feud that let to Kung Fu being unmasked on October 26, 1990 as he lost a Luchas de Apuestas match. After losing his mask Kung Fu seemed to have lost a step or two in the ring, losing part of appeal when he lost the mask, something which is not uncommon in Lucha libre. After his mask loss Kung Fu turned rudo, using his nunchuks to attack other wrestlers. After an initial push as a rudo Kung Fu started to sink in the ranks, being used more and more to help young wrestlers gain experience and make them look good. Kung Fu remained with EMLL (by then renamed Consejo Mundial de Lucha Libre (CMLL)) until 1994, where he began working on the independent circuit. Around the same time Cuesta introduced "Kung Fu, Jr." to the wrestling world, unlike some family relationships in Lucha libre that are fictional Kung Fu, Jr. is actually the son of Raymundo Cuesta. After touring with Kung Fu, Jr. for a while Cuesta went into semi-retirement and began working for the Mexican Government instead. He made occasional appearances for years, never fully retiring from wrestling.

== Death ==
On January 3, 2001 Raymundo Cuesta Veloz died from arterial hyper tension, no one had reported that Cuesta had felt ill up to the day he died and he is believed to have died in his sleep. Cuesta was not found until January 5 when his son went to his father's house to check on him.

== Championships and accomplishments ==
- Empresa Mexicana de Lucha Libre
  - Arena Coliseo Tag Team Championship (2 times) – with Kato Kung Lee
  - Mexican National Welterweight Championship (2 times)
  - NWA World Middleweight Championship (1 time)
- Universal Wrestling Association
  - UWA World Trios Championship (1 time) – with Kato Kung Lee and Black Man

== See also ==
- List of premature professional wrestling deaths

== Luchas de Apuestas record ==
Winner (wager)	Loser (wager)	Location	Event	Date	Notes
Erick Romano (hair)	Ray Acosta (hair)	N/A	Live event	N/A	
Villano III (mask)	Ray Acosta (hair)	Naucalpan, Mexico State	Live event	August 4, 1974	
Kato Kung Lee (hair)	Kung Fu (hair)	N/A	Live event	N/A	
Kung Fu (mask)	Orange Rain (mask)	N/A	Live event	N/A	
Kung Fu (mask)	La Muerte de la Barranca (mask)	Mexico City	Live event	N/A	
Kung Fu (mask)	El Indio (mask)	Mexico City	Live event	N/A	
Kung Fu (mask)	La Momia II (mask)	Monterrey, Nuevo León	Live event	March 14, 1976	
Kung Fu and Kato Kung Lee (masks)	El Jalisco I and II (masks)	Mexico City	Live event	October 27, 1978	
Kung Fu (mask)	El Ídolo (mask)	Mexico City	Live event	December 8, 1978	
Villano III and ?? (masks)	El Estudiante I and El Estudiante II (masks)	Mexico City	Live event	January 20, 1983	
Kung Fu (mask)	Kato Kung Lee (hair)	N/A	Live event	1988	
Kung Fu (mask)	Kato Kung Lee (hair)	N/A	Live event	April 1988	
Atlantis (mask)	Kung Fu (mask)	Mexico City	Live event	October 26, 1990	
Kato Kung Lee (hair)	Kung Fu (hair)	Mexico City	Live event	March 1, 1991	
César Dantés (hair)	Kung Fu (hair)	Mexico City	Live event	November 22, 1992	
Américo Rocca (hair)	Kung Fu (hair)	Mexico City	Live event	May 8, 1994	
Atlantis (mask)	Kung Fu (hair)	Mexico City	Live event	September 1, 1996	
