= Francisco Flores (wrestling) =

Mexican professional wrestling promoter

Professional wrestling career
- Ring name(s): Francisco Flores; Blue Scorpion; El Torro; Mexican Angel; El Ángel Mexicano; Golden Falcon; Yaki Joe; The Avenger
- Billed height: 5 ft 10 in (178 cm)
- Billed weight: 163 lb (74 kg)

Francisco Flores (date of birth unknown) is a former Mexican professional wrestling promoter who is most known for his part in creating and running the Universal Wrestling Association from the mid-1970s until the 1990s when it closed down. At one point in time the UWA's shows as the Toreo de Quatro Caminos arena were the biggest drawing shows in all of Mexico, putting the UWA in contention for being the biggest wrestling promotion in Mexico at the time. As a promoter Flores helped make such wrestlers as El Canek and El Hijo del Santo world-renowned wrestlers.

== Promotional career ==
Flores started his career as a wrestling promoter as a minor promoter for Empresa Mexicana de Lucha Libre (EMLL), Mexico's largest and the world's oldest wrestling promotion. After working for EMLL for years he became frustrated with EMLL's very conservative approach to wrestling and wanted to promote his vision for wrestling instead of EMLL's vision. From 1974 to 1976 Flores worked in World Wide Wrestling Federation. In 1975 Flores, along with Ray Mendoza broke away from EMLL and formed the rival Universal Wrestling Association (UWA). In the UWA Flores focused on featuring young wrestlers who were often not given a chance in EMLL, this included Ray Mendoza's sons Villano I, Villano II and Villano III. Villano III especially benefitted from Flores' way of promoting as he became one of the rising young stars in the mid to late 1970s. Flores and the UWA's promotion of El Canek made him a world wide wrestling star, booking him as the "Mexican defender" against a variety of foreign wrestlers such as Hulk Hogan and André the Giant. The UWA also helped give a young El Hijo del Santo his start in wrestling.

The UWA flourished in the 1970s and 1980s but hit harder times in the 1990s and was forced to close down in 1995 after which Francisco Flores went into retirement.

== Championships and accomplishments ==
- NWA All-Star Wrestling
  - NWA Canadian Tag Team Championship (Vancouver version) (1 time) - with Bobby Bass
  - NWA Pacific Coast Heavyweight Championship (Vancouver version) (1 time)
- NWA Hollywood Wrestling
  - NWA Americas Tag Team Championship (1 time) - with Alfonso Dantés
- NWA Mid-America
  - NWA Mid-America Heavyweight Championship (1 time)
  - NWA Mid-America Tag Team Championship (1 time) - with Duke Myers
  - NWA World Six-Man Tag Team Championship (1 time) - with George Gulas and Bobby Eaton
- Southeastern Championship Wrestling
  - NWA Southeastern Tag Team Championship (1 time) - with Duke Myers
- Stampede Wrestling
  - Stampede International Tag Team Championship (1 time) - with Cuban Assassin
- World Wrestling Council
  - WWC World Tag Team Championship (1 time) - with Fidel Sierra
- Wrestling Observer Newsletter
  - Wrestling Observer Newsletter Hall of Fame (Class of 2003)
