= El Hijo del Villano III =

Mexican professional wrestler

Personal information
- Born: Díaz Velarde (first name not revealed); November 26, 1999 (age 26) Mazatlan, Sinaloa, Mexico
- Parent: Villano III (father)
- Relatives: Villano III Jr. (brother); Villano I (uncle); Villano II (uncle); Villano IV (uncle); Villano V (uncle); Ray Mendoza (grandfather)

Professional wrestling career
- Ring name: El Hijo de Villano III
- Billed height: 1.84 m (6 ft 0 in)
- Billed weight: 82 kg (181 lb)
- Trained by: Villano III; Villano V; Arkangel de la Muerte; Virus; Último Dragoncito; Último Guerrero
- Debut: December 25, 2013

Achievements and titles

El Hijo del Villano III (Spanish: "The Son of Villano III; born November 26, 1999) is a Mexican professional wrestler. He is working for Consejo Mundial de Lucha Libre (CMLL), where he is a former CMLL Arena Coliseo Tag Team Champion (with Villano III Jr.). He portrays a rudo ("bad guy") wrestling character. A third-generation wrestler, he is the son of Villano III and La Infernal, and grandson of Ray Mendoza. His older brother is also a enmascarado, known as Villano III Jr., his uncles include luchadors Villano I, Villano II, Villano IV, Villano V and he is the cousin of Villano V Jr. and Rokambole Jr.

In CMLL, he has often been programmed opposite Atlantis Jr., alluding to the long running storyline feud between their fathers Villano III and Atlantis. El Hijo del Villano III's real name is not a matter of public record, as is often the case with masked wrestlers in Mexico where their private lives are kept a secret from the professional wrestling fans.

== Early life ==
El Hijo del Villano III was born on November 26, 1999, son of professional wrestlers Arturo Díaz Mendoza (known under the ring name Villano III) and Luz Lorena Velarde Murillo (La Infernal). His older brother, known simply as Villano III Jr. was born a year prior, on July 11, 1998. His birth name has not been revealed to the general public, which is the tradition in lucha libre where news outlets do not publish the real names of any masked wrestler who has not lost their mask in a match. Four of his uncles also worked in professional wrestling, all using the ring name "Villano"; José de Jesús (Villano I), Alfredo (Villano II), Raymundo (Villano V), and Tomás (Villano IV).

He started training for a career in professional wrestling when he was only 8 years old and made his actual debut at the age of 15. Initially he was trained by his father as well as his uncles Arturo Raymundo and Thomas.

== Professional wrestling career ==
El Hijo del Villano III made his first in-ring appearance at the age of just 13, working an exhibition match on the undercard of a show honoring his father's 40th wrestling anniversary. Once he turned 15 and could be licensed by the boxing and wrestling commission, he made his official debut on December 25, 2013. In subsequent years he won the Mexican State Tag Team Championship with his brother Villano III Jr. as well as the Mexican State Trios Championship with his father and his brother.

=== Consejo Mundial de Lucha Libre (2018–present) ===
He began training in the CMLL wrestling school in 2018, receiving training and guidance from Arkangel de la Muerte, Virus, Último Dragoncito and Último Guerrero, building on the training he received from his father and uncle Villano IV prior to his in-ring debut. He made his CMLL debut on their 2018 Christmas show, winning his debut match alongside his uncle Villano IV and Mephisto as they defeated Atlantis, Black Panther and Blue Panther Jr. During the build to his debut CMLL presented him as a natural rival to Atlantis Jr., mirroring the rivalry between Villano III and Atlantis. El Hijo del Villano III made his first appearance as a major CMLL show only a week after his in-ring debut for the company as he, Villano IV and El Felino lost to Los Gorilas del Ring (Kraneo and Volcano) and El Hijo de LA Park at CMLL's annual Sin Piedad show.

On May 25, 2019, El Hijo del Villano III participated in his first major CMLL tournament, the Puebla version of their annual Torneo Nacional de Parejas Increíbles tournament where a rudo and a tecnico are forced to team together for the tournament. El Hijo del Villano III was teamed up with one of CMLL's main event performers, Carístico. The mismatched duo defeated Atlantis and Vangellys in the first round, Audaz and Sansón, before ultimately losing to Niebla Roja and El Terrible in the semi-final round. The second-generation rivalry between the Villano and Atantis family led to El Hijo del Villano III and Atlantis Jr. facing off in their first one-on-one match on July 5, 2019, a match that ended in a double count out as both wrestlers were fighting outside the ring for too long.

In July 2023, he was joined in CMLL by his brother Villano III Jr., who had jumped ship from AAA. They quickly formed the trio “El Triangulo” with Zandokan Jr., and the siblings won the CMLL Arena Coliseo Tag Team Championships at the Arena Coliseo 81st Anniversary Show on April 6, 2024. They lost the titles 2 years later at the 83rd anniversary on April 4th, 2026, to fellow brother tag team Los Hermanos Calavera.

== Championships and accomplishments ==
- Consejo Mundial de Lucha Libre
  - CMLL Arena Coliseo Tag Team Championship (1 time) – with Villano III Jr.
  - Copa Herederos (2025)
  - Copa Dinistias - Hermanos (2026 - with Villano III Jr.)
- Distrito Federal

- Mexican State Tag Team Championship (1 time) – with Villano III Jr.
- Mexican State Trios Championship (1 time) – with Villano III Jr. and Villano III

- International Wrestling Revolution Group

- Torneo FILL 58 – with Black Laser, Climax Jr., Kortiz, Máquina Infernal, Tackle, Villano III Jr., and Zhalon

- Pro Wrestling Illustrated
  - Ranked No. 448 of the top 500 singles wrestlers in the PWI 500 in 2025

== Luchas de Apuestas record ==
| Winner (wager) | Loser (wager) | Location | Event | Date | Notes |
|---|---|---|---|---|---|
| El Hijo del Villano III (mask) | Calaco (hair) | Mexico City, Mexico | Arena 23 de Junio show | November 26, 2014 | |
| El Hijo del Villano III (mask) | Steel Bull (mask) | Puebla, Puebla | 12 Máscaras en juego | October 14, 2018 | (Note: Last two wrestlers in a steel cage match that also included Brazo Celestial, Rey Dragón, Payaso Retro, Castigador, Bufalo, Boy Fly, Fuego Negro, Murciélago, Centella Roja, Tritón TK) |
