= CMLL Arena Coliseo Tag Team Championship =

Professional wrestling tag team championship

- One of the belts that represent the championship

Details
- Promotion: Consejo Mundial de Lucha Libre (CMLL)
- Date established: November 7, 2000 (Modern version)
- Current champions: Los Hermanos Calavera (Calavera Jr. I and Calavera Jr. II)
- Date won: April 4, 2026

Other names
- EMLL Arena Coliseo Tag Team Championship (1960–2000); CMLL Arena Coliseo Tag Team Championship (2000–present)
Statistics
- First champions: Alan Stone and Chris Stone (Modern version)
- Most reigns: Kung Fu and Kato Kung Lee (2 reigns)
- Longest reign: Stuka Jr. and Flash/Fuego (1,708 days; Modern version)
- Shortest reign: El Cuatrero and Sansón (207 days; Modern version)
- Oldest champion: Black Terry (64 years, 113 days)
- Youngest champion: The Panther (17-18 years); Modern version
- Heaviest champion: Namajague (100 kg (220 lb); Modern version)
- Lightest champion: Flash / Fuego (78 kg (172 lb); Modern version)

The CMLL Arena Coliseo Tag Team Championship (Spanish: Campeonato de Parejas de la Arena Coliseo del CMLL) is a professional wrestling tag team championship promoted by the Mexican Lucha Libre wrestling-based Consejo Mundial de Lucha Libre (CMLL) since 2000. The championship is considered a revival of the EMLL Arena Coliseo Tag Team Championship that was used in the 1960s and 1970s when CMLL was known as "Empresa Mexicana de Lucha Libre" (EMLL). The CMLL Arena Coliseo Tag Team Championship is considered a secondary championship, with the CMLL World Tag Team Championship being the primary championship for the tag team division in CMLL. As it is a professional wrestling championship, its holders are determined by promoters or promotions, not by athletic competition. As the name indicates the championship is intended to be defended in Arena Coliseo in Mexico City, one of CMLL's primary venues.

The current champions are Los Hermanos Calavera (Calavera Jr. I and Calavera Jr. II). They defeated El Triangulo (El Hijo del Villano III and Villano III Jr.) at CMLL 83. Aniversario Arena Coliseo on April 4, 2026 in Ciudad de Mexico.

== Background ==
The Arena Coliseo Tag Team Championship was originally created in the mid-to-late 1960s by Empresa Mexicana de Lucha Libre (EMLL, who would change their name to CMLL around 1990) as a secondary title to the Mexican National Tag Team Championship (then-called the EMLL Arena México Tag Team Championship), which was the promotion's top tag team title at the time. (Note: Duncan & Will (2000) pp. 396-397: "Mexico: National Tag Team Title") Records of champions from that era are sparse with no records of who was the first champion, nor are there any records of exactly when the title was abandoned in the 1980s. (Note: Duncan & Will (2000) p. 397: "Title inactive and abandoned in the 80s") This is further complicated by the apparent existence of a second pair of Coliseo tag titles, exclusive to Arena Coliseos weekly Sunday shows - this page & lineage refer to a set of titles that were originally defended only on Tuesdays. Due to sparse record keeping of local wrestling in Mexico between the 1960s and early 1980s no clear history exists from that time, it has been verified that Los Villanos (Villano I and Villano II), (Note: Duncan & Will (2000) p. 397: "Villano I & Villano II 1970s Mexico City, MEX unclear who they won the championship from") Kung Fu and Kato Kung Lee, (Note: Duncan & Will (2000) p. 397: "Kung Fu & Kato Kung Lee 1977 Mexico City, MEX") (Note: Duncan & Will (2000) p. 397: "Kung Fu & Kato Kung Lee 1978 Mexico City, MEX") and the team of Dios Rojo and Dios Negro all held the Arena Coliseo Tag Team Championship due to references to the teams defending the championship at an EMLL show. (Note: Duncan & Will (2000) p. 397: "Dios Rojo and Dios Negro 1970s Mexico City, MEX")

The Championship was revived in 2000, and was mainly contested for by younger or lower ranked wrestlers than those that challenged for the CMLL World Tag Team Championship. The first champions were found via a one night, eight-team tournament held to determine the first CMLL Arena Coliseo Tag Team Champions. On the night, the team of brothers Alan and Chris Stone (sometimes billed as "Motorcross") defeated the teams of Neutron and La Flecha, Ricky Marvin and Sombra de Plata and finally Fugaz and Virus to become the first CMLL Arena Coliseo Tag Team Champions in the modern era. The Stone brothers defended the title until 2002, after which the championship was barely mentioned, much less promoted by CMLL. The title is considered inactive after the Stone brothers' last recorded title defense on October 22, 2002, against Valetin Mayo and Karloff Lagarde Jr. When both Stone brothers left CMLL in 2005 to work for AAA the championship was finally declared vacant.

In June 2008 CMLL announced that they were bringing the CMLL Arena Coliseo Tag Team Championship back. A 16-team tournament was held to crown new champions, the competitors were a mixture of regular teams and random parings of CMLL low to mid-card workers. The preliminary rounds were held on June 22, 2008, and saw the teams of Stuka Jr. and Flash (collectively known as Los Bombadieros; "The Bombardiers") and Los Infernales ("The Infernal Ones"; Euforia and Nosferatu) each win three matches to qualify for the final. On June 28, 2008, Stuka Jr. and Flash defeated Los Infernales to become the second CMLL Arena Coliseum Tag Team Champions of the modern age. Flash later changed his ring name to "Fuego". (Note: Súper Luchas (November 11, 2009): "Flash ahora se llamará Fuego" ("Flash is now known as Fuego")) On March 3, 2013, La Fiebre Amarilla ("The Yellow Fever"; Namajague and Okumura) defeated Fuego and Stuka Jr. to become the third modern age CMLL Arena Coliseo Tag Team Champions, ending the previous champions' four-and-a-half-year reign. (Note: MedioTiempo (March 3, 2013): "Los Japoneses Okumura y Namajague se llevaron el Campeonato de Parejas de la Arena Coliseo, los monarcas vendieron caro su triunfo pero cayeron finalmente y dieron fin a su largo reinado." ("The Japanese team of Okumura and Namajague won the Arena Coliseo Tag Team Championship of the Arena Coliseo, the champions fought hard for victory, but they finally lost and ended their long reign.")) On November 4, 2013, Delta and Guerrero Maya Jr. became the fourth modern age Arena Coliseo Tag Team Champions. After a long-running rivalry with the then-champions Delta and Guerrero Maya Jr., La Comando Caribeño ("The Caribbean Commando"; Misterioso Jr. and Sagrado) became the fifth modern day Arena Coliseo Tag Team Champions on February 28, 2015.

== Reigns ==
Guerrero Maya Jr. is the only wrestler to have two documented title reigns during the CMLL-era, as he previously held the titles with Delta. No team has held the championship more than once after it was brought back in 2000, but records indicate that team of Kung Fu and Kato Kung Lee held the championship on at least two separate occasions, possibly more. The current champions are also the shortest reigning champions of the modern age, 3,572, second to only to Namajague and Okumura's reign of 245 days, but will surpass that if they remain champions until August 28, 2017. Los Bombardieros reign is the longest of the modern age, 1,708 days although there were extended periods of time where the championship went undefended. Black Terry, who was 64 years old at the time of his title victory, is the oldest person to win the Arena Coliseo Tag Team Championship. The Panther was seventeen or eighteen years old at the time he won the championship, (Note: The Panther's exact birthdate is not a matter of public knowledge, only his birth year making an actual age calculation impossible) making him the youngest champion of at least the CMLL-era and possibly in the history of the championship. In 2005, after both Stone brothers left CMLL to work for AAA, the championship was finally declared vacant.

The current champions are Los Hermanos Calavera (Calavera Jr. I and Calavera Jr. II) in their first reign. They won the titles by defeating Los Villanos (El Hijo del Villano III and Villano III Jr.) at CMLL 83. Aniversario Arena Coliseo in Ciudad de Mexico, on April 4, 2026.

== Rules ==
The CMLL Arena Coliseo Tag Team Championship is designed for tag team competition only, teams of two, and has not allowed neither individual wrestlers to hold the championship by themselves nor teams of three to share the championship. The championship is considered a secondary championship for the tag team division, with the CMLL World Tag Team Championship being the primary championship for the tag team division in CMLL. (Note: Duncan & Will (2000) p. 396, chapter name "EMLL CMLL World Tag Team Title") As it is a professional wrestling championship, its holders are determined by promoters or promotions, not by athletic competition. (Note: Hornbaker (2016) p. 550: "Professional wrestling is a sport in which match finishes are predetermined. Thus, win–loss records are not indicative of a wrestler's genuine success based on their legitimate abilities - but on now much, or how little they were pushed by promoters")

CMLL promotes a number of championships with the "world" label as well as a number of championships restricted by geographical locations such as the Mexican National Championships, or the Guadalajara specific Occidente championships, but the CMLL Arena Coliseo Tag Team Championship was created specifically for Arena Coliseo in Mexico City. Arena Coliseo was once CMLL's primary venue with CMLL founder Salvador Lutteroth financing the construction of the building in the 1940s. While CMLL also promotes shows in "Arena Coliseo" in Guadalajara on a regular basis, and occasionally in other regional Arena Coliseos across Mexico it has restricted championship matches to Arena Coliseo in Mexico City. CMLL has only allowed the championship to be defended outside of Arena Coliseo in Mexico City on a few occasions, primarily in Arena México when the regularly scheduled Arena Coliseo shows had to be moved. In January 2016, CMLL allowed the championship to be defended in Korakuen Hall in Tokyo, as part of the Fantastica Mania 2016 tour. (Note: NJPW (January 23, 2016): "第3試合のアレナ・コリセオタッグ選手権試合ゲレーロ・マヤ・ジュニア＆テ・パンテルvsOKUMURA＆ボビー・スィーは、接戦の末にマヤがカウンターパイルドライバーでスィーを轟沈。" ("Arena Coliseo Tag Team Championship match Guerrero Maya Junior and The Panther vs Okumura and Bobby Z")) The championship has only been won and lost in Arena Coliseo, except for when Black Terry and Negro Navarro won the championship in Arena Naucalpan.

== Tournaments ==
=== 2000 ===
CMLL held a one-night, eight-team tournament on November 7, 2000, to determine the first CMLL Arena Coloseo Tag Team Champions of the modern era, bringing the titles back after abandoning them in the 1980s.

First round
Ricky Marvin and Sombra de Plata	W
Enemigo Pubico and Mazada
Los Hermanos Stone (Alan Stone and Motorcross)	W
Neutron and La Flecha
Volador Jr. and Mano Negra Jr.	W
Jeque and Sangre Azteca
Virus and Fugaz	W
Los Rayos Tapatío (Rayo Tapatío I and Rayo Tapatío II)

Semifinals
Ricky Marvin and Sombra de Plata
Los Hermanos Stone	W
Volador Jr. and Mano Negro Jr.
Virus and Fugaz	W

Final
Los Hermanos Stone	W
Virus and Fugaz

=== 2008 ===
CMLL held a 16-team tournament in 2008; the top half of the bracket took place on June 15, the bottom half on June 19 and the finals took place on June 29, 2008.

First round
Pandilla Guerrera (Arkangel and Hooligan)	W
Leono and Tony Rivera
Ángel Azteca Jr. and Mascara Purpura	W
Los Romanos (Caligula and Messala)
Metálico and Metalik	W
Los Hombres del Camoflaje (Artillero and Super Comando)
Los Infernales (Euforia and Nosferatu)	W
Los Rayos Tapatío (Rayo Tapatío I and Rayo Tapatío II)
Fabian el Gitano and Mictlán	W
Pólvora and Vaquero
Loco Max and Vangelis
Bronco and Diamante Negro	W
Pandilla Guerrera (Nitro and Skandalo)	W
Neutron and Sensei
Los Bombadieros (Stuka Jr. and Flash)	W
Astro Boy and Molotov

Second round
Ángel Azteca Jr. and Mascara Purpura	W
Pandilla Guerrera (Arkangel and Hooligan)
Metálico and Metalik
Los Infernales (Euforia and Nosferatu)	W
Fabian el Gitano and Mictlán
Bronco and Diamante Negro	W
Pandilla Guerrera (Nitro and Skandalo)
Los Bombardieros (Stuka Jr. and Flash)	W

Semifinals
Ángel Azteca Jr. and Mascara Purpura
Los Infernales (Euforia and Nosferatu)	W
Bronco and Diamante Negro
Los Bombardieros (Stuka Jr. and Flash)	W

Final
Los Infernales (Euforia and Nosferatu)
Los Bombardieros (Stuka Jr. and Flash)

=== 2018 ===
On February 14, 2018, then Arena Coliseo tag team champions Nuevo Generacion Dinamitas (El Cuatrero and Sansón) announced that they were giving up the championship to focus on a tournament for the vacant CMLL World Tag Team Championship that had just been announced. CMLL held a 16-team elimination tournament starting on February 24, 2018, with subsequent tournament matches taking place on March 5 and the finals on March 11. In the end Esfinge and Tritón defeated Disturbio and Virus to win the vacant championship.

Round of 16
Cancerbero and Raziel	W
Magia Blanca and Oro Jr.
Esfinge and Tritón	W
Nitro and Sangre Azteca
Fuego and Star Jr.	W
Akuma and Templario
Audaz and Pegasso
Puma and Tiger	W
Magnus and Sensei	W
Príncipe Diamante and Robin
Disturbio and Virus	W
Arkangel de la Muerte and Espanto Jr.
Astral and Stigma
Flyer and The Panther	W
Misterioso Jr. and El Sagrado	W
Metálico and El Hijo del Signo

Quarterfinals
Cancerbero and Raziel
Esfinge and Tritón	W
Fuego and Star Jr.
Puma and Tiger	W
Magnus and Sensei
Disturbio and Virus	W
Flyer and The Panther	W
Misteriosos Jr. and El Sagrado

Semifinals
Esfinge Tritón	W
Puma and Tiger
Disturbio and Virus	W
Flyer and The Panther

Finals
Esfinge and Tritón	W
Disturbio and Virus

== Title history ==
Name	Years
EMLL Arena Coliseo Tag Team Championship	1960–2000
CMLL Arena Coliseo Tag Team Championship	2000–present

Key
No.	Overall reign number
Reign	Reign number for the specific team—reign numbers for the individuals are in parentheses, if different
Days	Number of days held
N/A	Unknown information
+	Current reign is changing daily

No.	Champion	Championship change			Reign statistics		Notes	Ref.
No.	Champion	Date	Event	Location	Reign	Days	Notes	Ref.
Empresa Mexicana de Lucha Libre (EMLL)
1	Title created	1960s	N/A	N/A	N/A	N/A	The first Arena Coliseo Tag Team Champions have not been identified by sources only that it was not Curiel and El Rebelde.	(Note: Duncan & Will (2000), p. 397: Title referred to prior to the 1970s but no champions documented")
Championship history is unrecorded from 1960s to No later than December 1, 1964.
2	Apolo Curiel and El Rebelde	December 1, 1964 (NLT)	EMLL show	Mexico City	1	—		
Championship history is unrecorded from December 1, 1964 to March 21, 1967.
3	Chuco Villa and El Greco	October 25, 1966 (NLT)	EMLL show	Mexico City	1	—	Defeated El Solitario & El Vikingo in the finals of a two-week, eight-team tournament successfully defended the titles on March 21, 1967	
4	Benny Romero and Bobby Contreras	November 10, 1969 (NAT)	EMLL show	Mexico City	1	—		
Championship history is unrecorded from November 10, 1969 to 1970s.
5	Los Villanos (Villano I and Villano II)	1970s	Live event	Mexico City	1	—	reigning champions during Tuesday tournaments in 1972 & 1973	
Championship history is unrecorded from 1970s to 1977.
6	Kung Fu and Kato Kung Lee	1977	Live event	Mexico City	1	—		
Championship history is unrecorded from 1977 to 1978.
7	Kung Fu and Kato Kung Lee	1978	Live event	Mexico City	2	—		
Championship history is unrecorded from 1978 to 1979.
8	Dios Rojo and Dios Negro	1979	Live event	Mexico City	1	—		
Championship history is unrecorded from 1979 to 1980s.
—	Deactivated	1980s	—	—	—	—		
Consejo Mundial de Lucha Libre (CMLL)
9	Los Hermano Stone (Alan Stone and Chris Stone / Motorcross)	November 7, 2000	Live event	Mexico City	1	714 (Note: While the last date the titles were active is unknown, the last date the titles were defended is known, October 22, 2002 and is used to determine the length of their reign.)	Defeated Fugaz and Virus in the finals of a one-night, eight-team tournament.	
—	Deactivated	October 22, 2002	—	—	—	—	Championship inactive at some point after the last recorded title defense on this date	
—	Vacated	2005	—	—	—	—	Championship officially vacated when Alan and Chris Stone left CMLL	
10	Los Bombardieros (Stuka Jr. and Flash / Fuego)	June 29, 2008	Live event	Mexico City	1	1,708	Defeated Los Infernales (Euforia and Nosferatu) in the finals of a 16-team tournament.	
11	La Fiebre Amarilla (Namajague and Okumura)	March 3, 2013	CMLL Domingos De Coliseo	Mexico City	1	245		
12	Los Reyes de la Atlantida (Delta and Guerrero Maya Jr.)	November 3, 2013	CMLL Sabados De Coliseo	Mexico City	1	482		(Note: CMLL (November 4, 2013): "¡Los Reyes Nipones han muerto! ¡El Campeonato de Parejas de la Arena Coliseo es nuevamente de una dupla de mexicanos!" ("The Nippon Kings are dead! The Arena Coliseo Tag Team Champions are once again a pair of Mexicans!"))
13	Comando Caribeño (Misterioso Jr. and Sagrado)	February 28, 2015	Sabados Retros	Mexico City	1	294		(Note: CMLL (March 1, 2015): "que en la caída definitiva se llevaron a sus rivales con “La Rosa”, lo cual fue más que suficiente para ceñirse el oro y convertirse en los nuevos Monarcas de Parejas de este recinto sagrado" ("In the final fall they took out their rivals with "La Rosa", which was more than enough to gain the gold and become the new tag team champions of this renowned arena."))
14	Guerrero Maya Jr. (2) and The Panther	December 19, 2015	Sabados Retros	Mexico City	1	372		
15	Black Terry and Negro Navarro	December 25, 2016	Chairo 7: Hell in a Christmas Cell	Mexico City	1	209	Terry and Navarro did not work for CMLL when they won the championship.	(Note: MedioTiempo (December 26, 2016): "La a calidad y experiencia de Black Terry y Negro Navarro, se impuso en el evento denominado Chairo 7, donde los veteranos gladiadores le quitaron el cetro a Guerrero Maya Jr. y The Panther" ("The skill and experience of Black Terry and Black Navarro prevailed at the Chairo 7 event, where the veteran gladiators took the championship from Guerrero Maya Jr. and The Panther"))
16	Nuevo Generacion Dinamitas (El Cuatrero and Sansón)	July 22, 2017	Sabado Arena Coliseo	Mexico City	1	207		
—	Vacated	February 14, 2018	—	—	—	—	Championship vacated as Nuevo Generacion Dinamitas wanted to pursue the CMLL World Tag Team Championship	
17	OneAtos Style (Esfinge and Tritón)	March 10, 2018	Sabado Arena Coliseo	Mexico City	1	781	Defeated Disturbio and Virus in the finals of a tournament to win the vacant championship	
—	Vacated	April 29, 2020	CMLL Informa	—	—	—	Championship vacated after Tritón left CMLL in September 2019	
18	Hombre Bala Jr. and Robin	April 2, 2022	79 Aniversario Arena Coliseo	Mexico City	1	346	Defeated La Ola Negra (Akuma Jr. and Espanto) to win the vacant championship	
19	Furia Roja and Guerrero de la Muerte	March 14, 2023	Sabado Arena Coliseo	Mexico City	1	207		
20	La Ola Negra (Akuma and Espanto Jr.)	October 7, 2023	Sabado Arena Coliseo	Mexico City	1	182		
21	Los Villanos (El Hijo del Villano III and Villano III Jr.)	April 6, 2024	Sábados de Coliseo - 81: Aniversario de la Arena Coliseo	Ciudad de Mexico	1	728		
22	Los Hermanos Calavera (Calavera Jr. I and Calavera Jr. II)	April 4, 2026	CMLL 83. Aniversario Arena Coliseo	Ciudad de Mexico	1	185+		

== Combined reigns ==
=== Individual ===
Key

Symbol	Meaning
†	Indicates the current champion
¤	The exact length of at least one title reign is uncertain.
+	Indicates the current champions, the calculation changes daily.

Rank	Wrestler	No. of reigns	Combined days	Ref(s).
1	Stuka Jr.	1	1708	
1	Flash / Fuego	1	1708	
3	Guerrero Maya Jr.	2	854	
4	Esfinge	1	781	
4	Tritón	1	781	
6	Chris Stone	1	714	
6	Alan Stone	1	714	
8	El Hijo del Villano III	1	728	
8	Villano III Jr.	1	728	
10	Delta	1	482	
11	The Panther	1	379	
12	Hombre Bala Jr.	1	346	
12	Robin	1	346	
14	Misterioso Jr.	1	294	
14	Sagrado	1	294	
16	Namajague	1	245	
16	Okumura	1	245	
18	Black Terry	1	209	
18	Negro Navarro	1	209	
20	El Cuatrero	1	207	
20	Sansón	1	207	
20	Furia Roja	1	207	
20	Guerrero de la Muerte	1	207	
24	Akuma	1	182	
24	Espanto Jr.	1	182	
26	Calavera Jr. I†	1	185+	
26	Calavera Jr. II†	1	185+	
