= Villano III Jr. =

Mexican professional wrestler

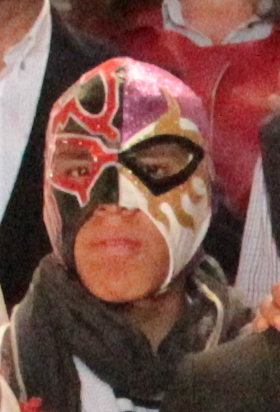
- Villano III Jr. in 2018

Personal information
- Born: Díaz Velarde (first name not revealed); July 11, 1998 (age 28) Mazatlan, Sinaloa, Mexico
- Parents: Villano III (father); La Infernal (mother)
- Relatives: El Hijo del Villano III (brother); Villano I (uncle); Villano II (uncle); Villano IV (uncle); Villano V (uncle); Ray Mendoza (grandfather)

Professional wrestling career
- Ring name: Villano III Jr.
- Billed height: 1.72 m (5 ft 7 1/2 in)
- Billed weight: 82 kg (181 lb)
- Trained by: Arkangel de la Muerte; El Apache; Franco Colombo; Villano IV
- Debut: 2013

Villano III Jr. (born July 11, 1998) is a Mexican professional wrestler. He is working for Mexican promotion Consejo Mundial de Lucha Libre (CMLL), where he is a former CMLL Arena Coliseo Tag Team Champion (with El Hijo del Villano III). He has also worked for Lucha Libre AAA Worldwide (AAA), where he is a one-time AAA World Mixed Tag Team Champion (with Lady Maravilla). A third-generation wrestler, he is the son of Villano III and La Infernal and the grandson of Ray Mendoza. Villano III Jr.'s real name is not a matter of public record, as is often the case with masked wrestlers in Mexico where their private lives are kept a secret from the professional wrestling fans.

== Professional wrestling career ==
Villano III Jr. made his first appearance under that name in an exhibition match on the undercard of a show honoring his father's 40th wrestling anniversary on February 5, 2012. In subsequent years, he won the Mexican State Tag Team Championship with his brother El Hijo del Villano III as well as the Mexican State Trios Championship with his father and his brother.

=== Lucha Libre AAA Worldwide (2017–2023) ===
In 2017 Villano III Jr. was one of several young professional wrestlers who participated in Lucha Libre AAA Worldwide's "a Llave a Gloria" ("The Key to Glory") tournament. The final match of the tournament took place at AAA's Triplemanía XXV show, where Villano III Jr., Angel Mortal Jr. and Tiger Boy lost to Angelikal, El Hijo del Vikingo and The Tigger. Despite the loss Villano III Jr. became a regular for AAA afterwards, competing of several of their major shows such as Héroes Inmortales XI, as well as teaming with La Hiedra to unsuccessfully challenge Big Mami and Niño Hamburguesa for the AAA World Mixed Tag Team Championship.

On March 16, 2019, at AAA's Rey de Reyes, Villano teamed up with Lady Maravilla for the AAA World Mixed Tag Team Championship against Mami and Hamburguesa, where they managed to retain their titles. On August 3, at Triplemanía XXVII, Villano teamed up with Maravilla in a match for the AAA World Mixed Tag Team Championship. The team defeated Australian Suicide and Vanilla Vargas, Mami and Hamburguesa and Sammy Guevara and Scarlett Bordeaux, to be crowned as new champions, Villano III Jr.'s first AAA championship. On October 19 at Héroes Inmortales XIII, Villano III Jr. along with Maravilla, had their first defense defeating Keyra and Látigo and her rivals in Mami and Hamburguesa.

Villano III Jr. wrestled his last match for AAA on July 2, 2023, in a loss to Octagon Jr..

=== Consejo Mundial de Lucha Libre (2023-present) ===
Two weeks later on July 18, 2023, Villano III Jr. debuted for CMLL to join his brother El Hijo del Villano III. They quickly formed the trio “El Triangulo” with Zandokan Jr., and the siblings won the CMLL Arena Coliseo Tag Team Championships at the Arena Coliseo 81st Anniversary Show on April 6, 2024. They lost the titles 2 years later at the 83rd anniversary on April 4, 2026, to fellow brother tag team Los Hermanos Calavera.

The following month, Villano III Jr. qualifier for the final of La Copa Junior against Atlantis Jr., in a spiritual rematch of their fathers’ famous bout. Atlantis Jr. suffered an injury shortly before the final, and was replaced by the previous year’s winner & Villano III Jr.‘s former teammate Zandokan Jr., who had since-distanced himself from the brothers due to what he perceived as a lack of rudo ethics on their part. On May 29, Villano III Jr. defeated Zandokan Jr. to win 2026’s La Copa Jr.

== Championships and accomplishments ==
- Consejo Mundial de Lucha Libre
  - CMLL Arena Coliseo Tag Team Championship (1 time) – with El Hijo del Villano III
  - La Copa Junior VIP (2026)
  - Copa Dinistias - Hermanos (2026 - with El Hijo del Villano III)
  - CMLL Bodybuilding Contest (2024 - Beginner)
- Distrito Federal
  - Mexican State Tag Team Championship (1 time) – with El Hijo del Villano III
  - Mexican State Trios Championship (1 time) – with El Hijo del Villano III and Villano III
- International Wrestling Revolution Group
  - Torneo FILL 58 – with Black Laser, Climax Jr., El Hijo del Villano III Jr., Kortiz, Máquina Infernal, Tackle, and Zhalon
- Lucha Libre AAA Worldwide
  - AAA World Mixed Tag Team Championship (1 time) – with Lady Maravilla

== Luchas de Apuestas record ==
Winner (wager)	Loser (wager)	Location	Event	Date	Notes
Villano III Jr. (mask)	Aéreo (mask)	Ciudad Juárez, Chihuahua	AAA show	March 1, 2020	
