= Villano III =

Mexican professional wrestler (born 1952)

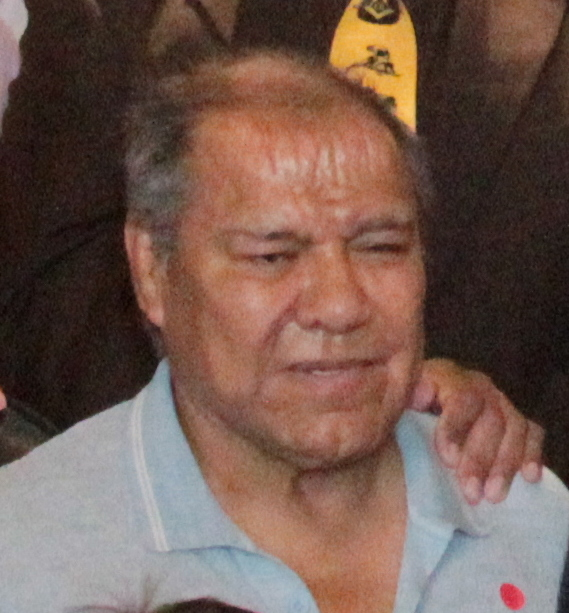
- Villano III in July 2018

Personal information
- Born: Arturo Díaz Mendoza; March 23, 1952 Mexico City, Mexico
- Died: August 21, 2018 (aged 66) Guadalajara, Mexico
- Spouse: La Infernal (wife)
- Children: El Hijo del Villano III (son); Villano III Jr. (son)
- Parents: Ray Mendoza (father); Guadalupe Mendoza (mother)
- Relatives: Villano I (brother); Villano II (brother); Villano IV (brother); Villano V (brother)

Professional wrestling career
- Ring names: Búfalo Salvaje; Mancha Roja; Pulpo Blanco; Ray Rosas; Rokambole; Villano III
- Billed height: 1.70 m (5 ft 7 in)
- Billed weight: 96 kg (212 lb)
- Trained by: Felipe Ham Lee; Ray Mendoza
- Debut: January 29, 1970
- Retired: May 13, 2017

Achievements and titles

Arturo Díaz Mendoza (March 23, 1952 – August 21, 2018), best known by his ring name Villano III (Spanish: "Villano Tercero"; English: "Villain the Third"), was a Mexican professional wrestler. A second-generation wrestler, he was the son of professional wrestler Ray Mendoza and the father of fellow professional wrestlers Villano III Jr. and El Hijo del Villano III. All five of the Díaz brothers used the Villano name; José de Jesús (Villano I), José Alfredo (Villano II), Tomás (Villano IV) and Raymundo (Villano V). Of the five Villanos, Arturo was considered the most successful in terms of championship and Lucha de Apuestas ("bet match") wins, as well as the most talented professional wrestler in the family. Due to health issues stemming from wrestling, he retired in 2015. A few days after his death, he was inducted in the AAA Hall of Fame.

During his 35-year career, Díaz was a featured performer for the Universal Wrestling Association (UWA) and all major Mexican promotions such as Consejo Mundial de Lucha Libre (CMLL) and Lucha Libre AAA Worldwide (AAA), as well as numerous notable smaller Mexican promotions like International Wrestling Revolution Group (IWRG). Díaz was a masked professional wrestler until 2000, when he lost to Atlantis and had to unmask as a result. The match against Atlantis was later voted "Match of the Year" in the Wrestling Observer Newsletter year-end awards. In contrast, one of his last matches ever, which took place at Triplemanía XXIII, was voted the "worst match of the year" in 2015.

== Professional wrestling career ==
Arturo Díaz was born into a wrestling family; his father, Ray Mendoza, became a successful professional wrestler when Arturo was very young. His two older brothers, José de Jesús and José Alfredo, had begun wrestling in early 1969 when Arturo was just 17 years old. Arturo was trained both by his father and Felipe Ham Lee, a family friend, while also getting a degree in physical education in case professional wrestling did not work out for him. His debut on January 29, 1970 took place earlier than expected, as he was asked to replace someone who did not show up for a match. He was billed as "Ray Rosas" (Ray after his father and "Rosas" after the color of his wrestling attire) and worked without a mask.

To avoid revealing that he was the son of Ray Mendoza, Arturo began wrestling under various masked characters such as Pulpo Blanco (Spanish for "White Octopus") and Mancha Roja ("Red Stain"). At one point, he competed under the name Búfalo Salvaje ("Savage Buffalo"), which was used by his older brothers early in their careers when they worked as Búfalo Salvaje I and II. After several short-lived names, Arturo began wrestling as Rokambole, a name he would use for several years. The name would later be used by his younger brother Raymundo as well. In late 1970 or early 1971, his older brothers began wrestling as Villano I and Villano II, which they established as their permanent identity, creating what would later turn into a family tradition.

=== Universal Wrestling Association (1973–1994) ===
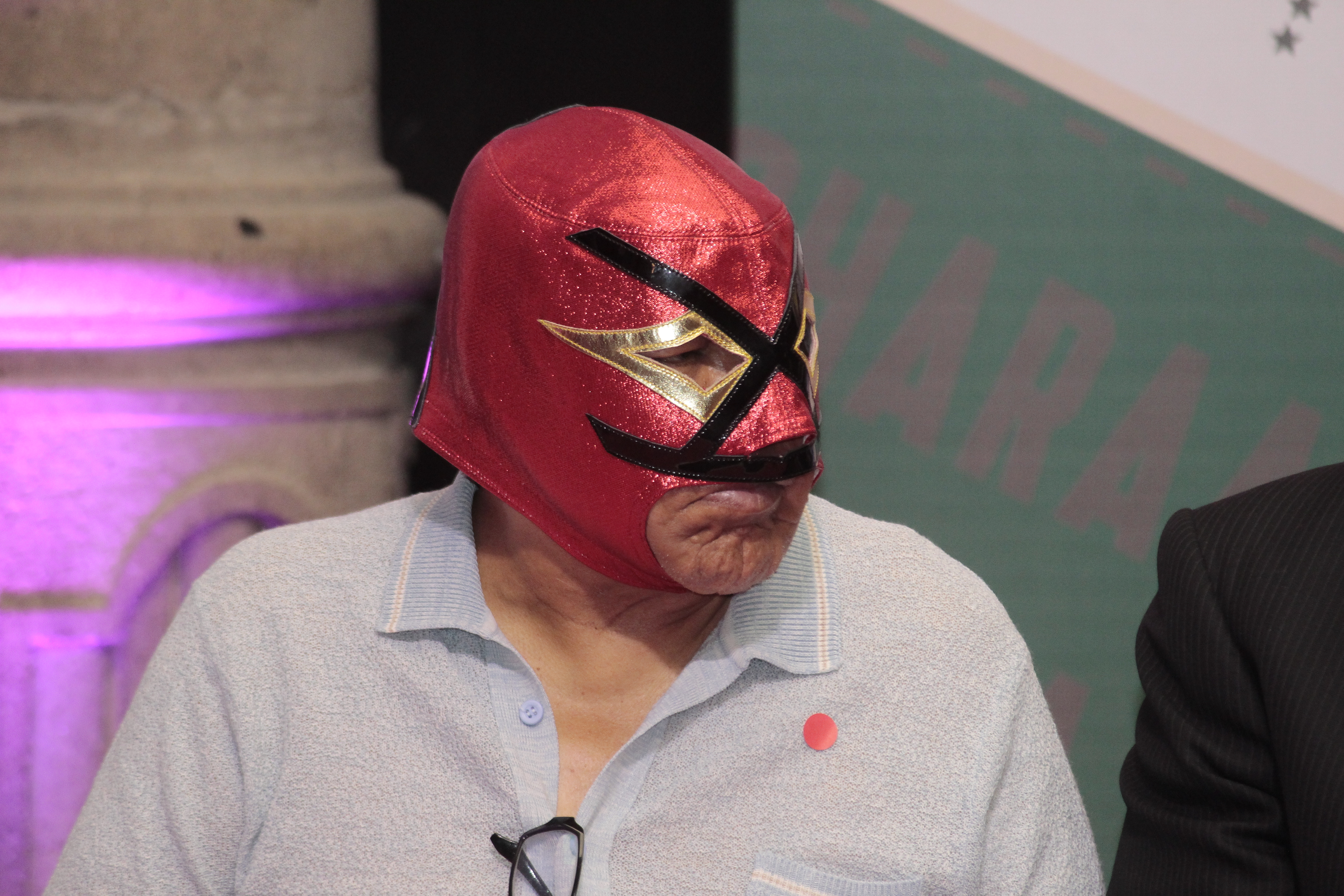
Villano III wearing the distinctive Villano mask that all the Villano brothers wore at some point in their career.

In 1973, Arturo's father and older brothers finally deemed him experienced enough to use the Villano name, taking the name Villano III ("Villano Tercero"). In 1975, Arturo's father joined with wrestling promoter Francisco Flores and investor Benjamín Mora Jr. to form a new wrestling promotion called Universal Wrestling Association (UWA), which was in direct competition with the company Ray Mendoza and Flores had worked for up until that point, Empresa Mexicana de Lucha Libre (EMLL). One of the reasons behind the split was that Mendoza felt that EMLL was not giving his sons enough opportunities in the ring. All three Villanos followed their father to the newly formed UWA. While his brothers worked as a tag team, Villano III became a singles competitor and was pushed as one of its top stars, due to his father's influence and being labeled the Villanos' most talented wrestler. On December 14, 1975, Villano III won a tournament to became the inaugural UWA World Welterweight Champion, holding the championship until May 29, 1977, when he lost it to El Solar. He then moved from the welterweight division (with a maximum weight of 78 kg (172 lb)) to the light heavyweight division (with a maximum of 97 kg (214 lb)). On March 1, 1981, he defeated Fishman to win the UWA World Light Heavyweight Championship, but lost it in a rematch 140 days later.

In 1982, Villano III started a storyline feud against Los Misioneros de la Muerte ("The Missionaries of Death"; El Signo, El Texano and Negro Navarro). UWA officials noticed Villano III's increasing popularity and used the feud to make him a tecnico (a face, those that portray the good guys in wrestling). Afterwards, Villano III, Aníbal and El Solitario formed a trio called Los Tres Caballeros ("The Three Gentlemen"), who would go on to main event a series of sold-out UWA shows. His first major opponent after the turn was Perro Aguayo, starting a long-running, intense feud over the WWF Light Heavyweight Championship, which the UWA promoted at the time. On March 20, 1983, Villano III defeated Aguayo to win the WWF Light Heavyweight Championship, beginning the first of seven reigns for Villano III, tied with Aguayo for most reigns with that title. His first reign lasted 140 days before Aguayo regained the title. The feud between the two also saw Villano III defeat Aguayo in a hair vs. mask Lucha de Apuestas ("bet match") on August 21. Villano III won his second WWF Light Heavyweight Championship from Gran Hamada in 1985. His second title reign lasted 826 days, which is the longest of any WWF Light Heavyweight Champion in its history.

During the mid-1980s, his two younger brothers began using the names "Villano IV" and "Villano V", often teaming with Villano I. Over the following years, Villano III traded the WWF Light Heavyweight Championship with Aguayo, Rambo and Sangre Chicana. In 1991, Villano III began working against the young Canadian Pegasus Kid, who New Japan Pro-Wrestling (NJPW) sent to Mexico to train and gain experience. Villano III and Pegasus Kid had a series of matches throughout the year, which included Pegasus Kid winning the title from Villano III on March 3, 1991. Later that year, before the end of Pegasus Kid's learning excursion, Villano III defeated him in a Lucha de Apuestas, forcing him to unmask and reveal his real name: Chris Benoit. On July 18, 1994, Villano III defeated El Signo for his seventh and final reign with the WWF Light Heavyweight Championship, which he vacated after the UWA closed in January 1995.

=== AAA (1995–1997) ===
Following the closure of UWA in 1995, Los Villanos signed with Antonio Peña's Lucha Libre AAA Worldwide (AAA), where they wrestled as a trios group, marking Villano III's transition from being primarily a singles wrestler to working more trios matches. In March 1996, Los Villanos defeated Cien Caras, Heavy Metal and Latin Lover to become the inaugural holders of the AAA Americas Trios Championship, a title created by Peña specifically for Los Villanos, as AAA did not have an active trios championship before. The team held the championship until November 19, when they lost to Los Oficiales (Guardia, Oficial and Vigilante), but regained it less than two months later. Los Villanos also became the first ever Mexican National Atómicos Champions, teaming with Pierroth Jr. to win the four-man team exclusive championship. By mid-1996, Villano IV and Villano V had begun working for the US-based World Championship Wrestling (WCW). In 1997, most of the wrestlers that worked for WCW split off from AAA to form Promo Azteca, which included the Villano brothers. By leaving AAA, Los Villanos vacated both the Americas Trios Championship and the Mexican National Atómicos Championship.

=== World Wrestling Council / Independent circuit (1997–1998) ===
After his AAA departure, Villano III toured Puerto Rico several times in 1997 and 1998 for the World Wrestling Council (WWC). He began the tour on November 27, 1997, defeating Ricky Santana to win the WWC Puerto Rican Championship. Two days later, Santana regained the championship, which Villano III won back on December 21. Villano did not work in Puerto Rico between January and April, only returning to the island to lose the championship to Glamour Boy Shane at WWC's 25th Anniversary Show on August 1. He also worked on the independent circuit and made sporadic appearances for both Consejo Mundial de Lucha Libre (CMLL) and Promo Azteca at the time. On July 18, 1998, Villano III was one of 32 wrestlers putting their masks on the line in a Ruleta de la Muerte ("Roulette of Death") tournament, where the losing teams advance and, in the end, the final team would face off in a Lucha de Apuestas. Villano III and his partner, Shocker, lost to Mil Máscaras and Rayo de Jalisco Jr. in the first round, but defeated El Hijo del Santo and Guerrero del Futuro in the second round to preserve their masks.

=== Consejo Mundial de Lucha Libre (1999–2002) ===
In late 1998, Villano III began working almost exclusively for CMLL. On December 25, 1999, Villano III and Super Astro teamed up to wrestle against Lizmark and Fishman in a Relevos Suicidas. When Villano III and Super Astro lost, they were forced to wrestle against each other in a Lucha de Apuestas, in which Villano III was victorious and forced Super Astro to unmask.

On November 22, 1999, Villano III defeated Atlantis to win the CMLL World Light Heavyweight Championship. The title change was just one of the highlights of a long-running feud between Atlantis and Villano III, a feud that also included III's younger brothers Villano IV and Villano V, who no longer worked for WCW. On March 17, 2000, at Juicio Final ("Final Judgment"), Villano III was forced to unmask after losing to Atlantis in a critically acclaimed Lucha de Apuestas, which was voted the Wrestling Observer 2000 Match of the Year. In 2010, Súper Luchas Magazine suggested that this may have been the professional wrestling match of the decade for the 2000s.

=== Post-unmasking (2000–2017) ===
A few months later, Villano III, IV and V defeated Escuadron de la Muerte ("The Death Squadron"; Cyborg Cop, Maniac Cop and Vader Cop) to win the IWRG Intercontinental Trios Championship. Los Villanos still worked for CMLL, but they had a talent sharing arrangement with International Wrestling Revolution Group (IWRG) that allowed Los Villanos to work for IWRG as well. Villano III's CMLL World Light Heavyweight Championship reign ended on September 7, 2001, when he was pinned by Shocker. Following the title loss, Los Villanos worked more infrequently for CMLL, taking bookings both in IWRG and on the Mexican independent circuit. On March 21, 2002, Villano III's last title reign ended when Los Villanos were stripped of the IWRG Intercontinental Trios Championship, as Villano V was injured and unable to defend the title. On July 30, 2005, Villano III teamed up with rookie wrestler Gallo Tapado Jr. for IWRG's La Copa Black Shadow tournament. The duo defeated the teams of El Matemático and Black Man Jr., Rambo and Bobby Lee Jr. and Brazo de Plata Jr. and Brazo de Oro to win the tournament.

In the latter half of the 2000s, Villano IV and V worked for CMLL on a regular basis, while Villano III's CMLL appearances were more sporadic, wrestling mainly on the independent circuit. Villano III frequently appeared in Lucha de Apuestas matches, having won the hair of Scorpio Jr. (twice), Brazo de Oro, Brazo de Platino and El Cobarde II during that time period, only losing one Apuesta to L.A. Park in a multi-man match on May 5, 2007, which resulted in the loss of his hair. Around 2010, Díaz's wrestling appearances were reduced, as he was dealing with both age and ring related ailments, working a much lighter schedule. 2013 saw him work eleven confirmed matches, and in 2014, he only competed in seven.

In May 2015, Arturo Díaz announced that he would retire from active competition due to several knee injuries and diminishing eyesight, leaving him unable to compete competitively. However, Díaz agreed to another match on August 9, teaming with his younger brothers to take on Los Psycho Circus (Psycho Clown, Monster Clown and Murder Clown) at Triplemanía XXIII, AAA's biggest show of the year, promoting it as Villano III's retirement match after a 45-year career. While Los Villanos won the match, the age of the Villanos and deteriorating health of Villano III and V led to many mistakes in a heavily criticized match, which was voted the "worst match of 2015" by the readers of the Wrestling Observer. Despite his retirement announcements and ailing health, Díaz did work one match in both 2016 and 2017.

== Personal life ==
Arturo Díaz Mendoza was the third son and third child overall of José Díaz Velazquez and Guadalupe "Lupita" Mendoza. His brothers, like himself, all became wrestlers: Alfredo (Villano II), José de Jesús (Villano I), Raymundo (Villano V), and Tomás (Villano IV). His mother Lupita died in 1986, his oldest brother Alfredo died in 1989, his second oldest brother José de Jesús died in 2002, and his father José Diaz died on April 16, 2003. Díaz was adamant that his sons get a good education instead of becoming wrestlers, wishing that they become lawyers or doctors as he wanted to spare them his own physical suffering. Once he realized that his two oldest sons had begun wrestling under masks, he agreed to train them and aid in their careers. He was also instrumental in training the rest of his sons, although he insisted they both get college degrees before they were allowed to begin wrestling. Since his youngest son, Tomás, finished his education first, he became known as "Villano IV", while Raymundo, the second youngest son, became "Villano V".

Díaz was married to Luz Lorena Velarde Murillo, who was a professional wrestler for many years, working under the name "La Infernal". Together, they have at least two children, two sons who wrestle under the names Villano III Jr. and El Hijo del Villano III. His nephews (sons of Raymundo) are also wrestlers, known as Rokambole Jr. and Villano V Jr. On March 17, 2017, CMLL honored Villano III as part of their annual Homenaje a Dos Leyendas ("Homage to Two Legends") show, their version of the Hall of Fame.

Arturo Díaz died of a cerebral infarction on August 21, 2018, after dealing with health issues, including complications from a stroke earlier in the year. Four days later, at Triplemanía XXVI, AAA inducted Arturo Díaz into the AAA Hall of Fame, honoring his career and his legacy, with his sons El Hijo del Villano III and Villano III Jr. accepting the honor on his father's behalf. CMLL also paid tribute to Villano III during the first edition of Super Viernes after Díaz's death, with Villano IV, V, El Hijo del Villano III and Villano III Jr. all acknowledged and honored during the show. Mephisto and L.A. Park both wore wrestling tights/masks resembling what Villano III wore during his career.

== Professional wrestling persona and style ==
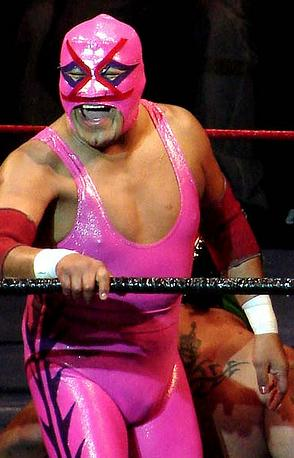
Villano V, wearing the ring gear that earned them the "Pink Panther" nickname.

In the 1970s and 1980s, Villano III was one of the top box office draws for the UWA, and has been referred to as one of the biggest stars in the history of lucha libre. A testament to his in-ring talent was the fact that he was often selected as the opponent for various top light heavyweight wrestlers from around the world. The 2000 Lucha de Apuestas match against Atlantis was voted the "Match of the Year" in the Wrestling Observer Newsletter year-end awards by the readers, the only Mexican match to ever earn this distinction.

Villano III's in-ring style focused more on fast action and explosive moves that looked realistic over the high flying style normally associated with light heavyweight wrestlers, although he would perform dives out of the ring and off the top rope. His in-ring speed helped make his La magistral cradle so effective that he was able to apply it to an opponent instantly. Over the years, he often used a DDT, where he would drive the opponent's head into the mat, and then swiftly transition into locking his "Media Cerrajera" submission hold (a standing figure-four leglock, chickenwing submission) to win matches. In a May 2008 article on Villano III, he claimed to have won approximately 140 masks and 100 hairs in his career, with the article itself outlining details for 77 Luchas de Apuestas matches. The Wrestling Observer stated that he had 58 successful Apuestas matches prior to his mask loss.

Arturo, as well as all other Díaz family members who have used the "Villano" name, have all worn the same distinctive mask, originally on a black base with a red "X" across the face and golden outlines around the eye holes, similar to a "bandit mask" worn by criminals in cartoons. Over the years, Los Villanos have changed their color schemes, such as red, blue, purple and, most notably, pink versions of the mask and tights. The pink color scheme earned Villano III the nickname "Pantera Rosa" or "Pink Panther", leading to Villano III often using "The Pink Panther Theme" by Henry Mancini as his entrance music.

== Championships and accomplishments ==
- AAA / Lucha Libre AAA Worldwide
  - AAA Americas Trios Championship (2 time) – with Villano IV and Villano V
  - Mexican National Atómicos Championship (1 time) – with Villano IV, Villano V and Pierroth Jr.
  - AAA Hall of Fame (Class of 2018)
- Arena Naucalpan
  - Arena Naucalpan Light Heavyweight Championship (1 time)
  - Arena Naucalpan Middleweight Championship (1 time)
- Consejo Mundial de Lucha Libre
  - CMLL World Light Heavyweight Championship (1 time)
  - Mexican National Trios Championship (1 time) – with Dos Caras and Villano IV
  - Homenaje a Dos Leyendas honoree (2017)
- International Wrestling Revolution Group
  - IWRG Intercontinental Trios Championship (1 time) – with Villano IV and Villano V
  - La Copa Black Shadow – with Gallo Tapado Jr.
- Pro Wrestling Illustrated
  - PWI ranked him #64 of the 500 best singles wrestlers of the PWI 500 in 2001
  - PWI ranked him #215 of the top 500 singles wrestlers of the PWI Years in 2003
- Universal Wrestling Association
  - UWA World Junior Heavyweight Championship (1 time)
  - UWA World Junior Light Heavyweight Championship (1 time)
  - UWA World Light Heavyweight Championship (2 times)
  - UWA World Welterweight Championship (1 time)
  - WWF Light Heavyweight Championship (7 times) (Note: Villano III won the championship seven times, but none of the reigns are officially recognized by the World Wrestling Entertainment. No reign prior to December 1997 is officially recognized by the WWE.)
- World Wrestling Council
  - WWC Puerto Rico Heavyweight Championship (2 time)
- World Wrestling Association
  - WWA World Trios Championship (1 time) – with Villano IV and Villano V
- Wrestling Observer Newsletter
  - Match of the Year (2000) vs. Atlantis in Mexico City on March 17
  - Worst Match of the Year (2015) with Villano IV and Villano V vs. Monster Clown, Murder Clown and Psycho Clown on August 9
  - Wrestling Observer Newsletter Hall of Fame (Class of 2019)
  - Wrestling Observer Newsletter Hall of Fame (Class of 2022) – As a member of Los Villanos with Villano I, Villano II, Villano IV, and Villano V)

== Luchas de Apuestas record ==
Winner (wager)	Loser (wager)	Location	Event	Date	Notes
Villano III (mask)	Oso Polar (mask)	Unknown	Live event	Unknown	
Villano III (mask)	Mr. Niebla (Note: This was the original Mr. Niebla, not related to the current Mr. Niebla) (mask)	Unknown	Live event	Unknown	
Villano III (mask)	Oso Polar II (mask)	Unknown	Live event	Unknown	
Villano III (mask)	César Valentino (hair)	Unknown	Live event	Unknown	
Villano III (mask)	Indio Vitela (hair)	Unknown	Live event	Unknown	
Villano III (mask)	Rubén Rubio (hair)	Unknown	Live event	Unknown	
Villano III (mask)	Toro Zúñiga (hair)	Unknown	Live event	Unknown	
Villano III (mask)	El Cuervo (mask)	Unknown	Live event	Unknown	
Villano III (mask)	El Cuervo (hair)	Unknown	Live event	Unknown	
Villano III (mask)	El Mariscal (hair)	Unknown	Live event	Unknown	
Villano III (mask)	Roy Meneses (hair)	Unknown	Live event	Unknown	
Villano III (mask)	Coloso Colosetti (hair)	Live event	Unknown	Unknown	
Villano III (mask)	Centella Nolasco (hair)	Unknown	Live event	Unknown	
Villano III (mask)	Carlos García (hair)	Unknown	Live event	Unknown	
Villano III (mask)	Orfeo Negro (mask)	Unknown	Live event	Unknown	
Villano III (mask)	El Fantasma de Hidalgo (mask)	Live event	Unknown	Unknown	
Villano III (mask)	La Momia del Convento (mask)	Live event	Unknown	Unknown	
Villano III (mask)	Mr. Dollar (mask)	Unknown	Live event	Unknown	
Villano III (mask)	El Médico I (mask)	Unknown	Live event	Unknown	
Villano III (mask)	Bestia Roja (mask)	Unknown	Live event	Unknown	
Villano III (mask)	The Tempest (mask)	Unknown	Live event	Unknown	
Villano III (mask) and Unknown (hair)	Los Hippies (hair) (Renato Torres and El Vikingo)	Unknown	Live event	Unknown	
Villano III and Búfalo Salvaje II (masks)	Los Ángeles Infernales (masks)	Unknown	Live event	Unknown	
Villano III (mask) and Unknown (mask)	Las Momias de Guanajuato (mask)	Unknown	Live event	Unknown	
Villano III (mask)	Rudy Espinosa (hair)	Ahuizotla, Mexico State	Live event	April 22, 1973	
Villano III (mask)	La Cobra (mask)	Naucalpan, Mexico State	Live event	February 17, 1974	
Villano III (mask)	El Jabalí (hair)	Tampico, Tamaulipas	Live event	May 6, 1974	
Villano III (mask)	Ray Acosta (hair)	Naucalpan, Mexico State	Live event	August 4, 1974	
Villano III and El Matemático (mask)	Los Hermanos Corzo I and II (mask)	Monterrey, Nuevo León	Live event	September 27, 1974	
Villano III and El Matemático (mask)	Los Hermanos Corzo I and II (hair)	Monterrey, Nuevo León	Live event	October 1974	
Villano III (mask)	Rudy Valentino (hair)	Tamaulipas	Live event	December 12, 1974	
Villano III (mask)	Zebra Kid (mask)	Naucalpan, Mexico State	Live event	1975	
Villano III (mask)	El Infernal II (mask)	Unknown	Live event	February 4, 1975	
Villano III (mask)	Orqídea Negra (mask)	Unknown	Live event	February 25, 1975	
Villano III (mask)	La Sombra (mask)	Unknown	Live event	April 6, 1975	
Villano III (mask)	El Desalmado (mask)	Unknown	Live event	July 13, 1975	
Villano III (mask)	Lobo Rubio (hair)	Mexico City, Mexico	Live event	July 26, 1975	
Villano III (mask)	Máscara Negra (mask)	Monterrey, Nuevo León	Live event	August 10, 1975	
Villano III (mask)	Estrella del Sur (mask)	Unknown	Live event	November 23, 1975	
Villano III (mask)	Memo Ventura (hair)	Naucalpan, Mexico State	Live event	December 14, 1975	
Villano III (mask)	Babe Face (hair)	Naucalpan, Mexico State	Live event	June 16, 1976	
Villano III (mask) and Bobby Lee (mask)	Los Escorpiones I and II (mask)	Mexico City, Mexico	Live event	August 13, 1978	
Villano III (mask)	Alberto Muñoz (hair)	Veracruz, Veracruz	Live event	April 28, 1979	
Villano III (mask)	Máquina Salvaje (hair)	Nezahualcoyotl, Mexico State	Live event	December 7, 1979	
Villano III (mask)	El Signo (hair)	Naucalpan, Mexico State	Live event	August 1, 1982	
Villano III (mask)	El Texano (hair)	Mexico City, Mexico	Live event	August 15, 1982	
Villano III and Unknown (mask)	El Estudiante I and El Estudiante II (mask)	Mexico City, Mexico	Live event	January 20, 1983	
Villano III (mask)	El Fantasma del Himalaya (mask)	Unknown	Live event	July 22, 1983	
Villano III (mask)	Perro Aguayo (hair)	Naucalpan, Mexico State	Live event	August 21, 1983	
Villano III (mask)	Flama Roja (mask)	Juárez, Chihuahua	Live event	May 1987	
Villano III (mask)	Rambo (mask)	Naucalpan, Mexico State	Live event	September 25, 1987	
Villano III (mask) and Perro Aguayo (hair)	Black Power I and Black Power II (mask)	Naucalpan, Mexico State	Live event	May 5, 1988	
Villano III (mask)	Lockard (mask)	Nezahualcoyotl, Mexico State	Live event	October 21, 1988	
Villano III (mask)	Pegasus Kid (mask)	Naucalpan, Mexico State	Live event	November 3, 1991	
Villano III (mask)	Rambo (hair)	Mexico City, Mexico	Live event	September 24, 1993	
Villano III (mask)	El Signo (hair)	Puebla, Puebla	Live event	July 25, 1994	
Villano III (mask)	El Mastodonte (mask)	Naucalpan, Mexico State	Live event	February 9, 1997	(Note: This was a steel Cage match)
Villano III (mask)	Super Astro (mask)	Tijuana, Baja California	Live event	December 25, 1999	(Note: Atlantis and Super Astro lost a Relevos Suicidas match against Lizmark and Fishman and were forced to wrestle each other.)
Atlantis (mask)	Villano III (mask)	Mexico City, Mexico	2000 Juicio Final	March 17, 2000	
Villano III (hair)	Máscara Año 2000 (hair)	Mexico City, Mexico	Live event	August 4, 2000	(Note: This was a steel cage match that also included Perro Aguayo and Pierroth Jr.)
Villano III (hair)	Rambo (hair)	Naucalpan, Mexico State	Live event	June 21, 2001	
Villano III (hair)	El Signo (hair)	Mexico City, Mexico	Live event	July 29, 2001	
Villano III (hair)	Super Brazo (hair)	Cuernavaca, Morelos	Live event	February 28, 2002	
Villano III (hair)	Brazo de Oro (hair)	Naucalpan, Mexico State	Live event	August 8, 2002	
Villano III (hair)	Brazo de Plata (hair)	Nezahualcoyotl, Mexico State	Live event	September 16, 2002	
Villano III (hair)	Kraken (hair)	Mexico City, Mexico	Live event	March 15, 2003	
Villano III (hair)	Pirata Morgan (hair)	Reynosa, Tamaulipas	Live event	October 28, 2003	(Note: This was a steel cage match.)
Villano III (hair)	El Cobarde II (hair)	Juárez, Chihuahua	Live event	March 21, 2004	
Villano III (hair)	Brazo de Oro (hair)	Unknown	Live event	July 11, 2004	(Note: Villano III and Brazo de Oro lost a Relevos Suicidas match against Shocker and Perro Aguayo Jr. the previous week.)
Villano III (hair)	El Signo (hair)	Querétaro, Querétaro	Live event	August 13, 2004	
Villano III (hair)	Veneno (hair)	Naucalpan, Mexico State	Live event	October 17, 2004	
Villano III (hair)	El Signo (hair)	Naucalpan, Mexico State]	Live event	January 16, 2005	(Note: Part of a Los Villanos vs. Los Misioneros de la Muerte match, the man pinned lost his hair.)
Villano III (hair)	Super Brazo (hair)	Tampico, Tamaulipas	Live event	February 14, 2005	(Note: This was a four-way match that also included Villano IV and Brazo de Platino)
Villano III (hair)	Rambo (hair)	Acapulco, Guerrero	Live event	June 11, 2005	
Villano III (hair)	Scorpio Jr. (hair)	Xalapa	Live event	December 1, 2005	
Villano III (hair)	Brazo de Oro (hair)	Querétaro	Live event	January 3, 2006	
Villano III (hair)	Brazo de Platino (hair)	Cuautitlan	Live event	May 16, 2006	(Note: Part of a Los Villanos (III/IV/V) vs. Los Brazos (Oro/Plata/Platino) Cage Match where the last man in the ring had his hair shaved off.)
Villano III (hair)	El Cobarde II (hair)	Pico Rivera, California	Live event	March 10, 2007	(Note: This was a three-way match that also included El Satánico.)
L.A. Park (mask)	Villano III (hair)	Mexico City, Mexico	Live event	May 5, 2007	(Note: This was a Cage of Death match that also included Blue Demon Jr., Villano IV, Villano V, Silver King, Satánico and Hijo del Solitario.)
Draw	Villano III (mask)/Mano Negra (mask)	Mexico City, Mexico	Live event	November 25, 2007	(Note: Exhibition match with wrestlers putting on masks they had lost in the past – and then going to a draw, with both "losing" their masks again.)
Villano III (hair)	Scorpio Jr. (hair)	Nezahualcoyotl, Mexico State	Live event	February 26, 2009	(Note: The two met in the finals of a "Losers advance" Ruleta de la Muerte tournament.)
