= Villano II =

Mexican professional wrestler (1949 – 1989)

Personal information
- Born: José Alfredo Díaz Mendoza; September 25, 1949 Mexico City, Mexico
- Died: April 17, 1989 (aged 39) Naucalpan, Mexico
- Parent: Ray Mendoza (father)
- Relatives: Villano I (brother); Villano III (brother); Villano V (brother); Villano IV (brother); Villano III Jr. (nephew); El Hijo del Villano III (nephew)

Professional wrestling career
- Ring name(s): Bestia Negra II; Búfalo Salvaje II; Villano II
- Billed height: 1.70 m (5 ft 7 in)
- Billed weight: 84 kg (185 lb)
- Trained by: Bobby Bonales; Ray Mendoza
- Debut: 1969
- Retired: 1985

José Alfredo Díaz Mendoza (September 25, 1949 – April 17, 1989), best known by his ring name Villano II (Spanish: "Villano Segundo"; English: "Villain the second"), was a Mexican professional wrestler. Despite being numbered "II", he was the oldest of the Díaz sons, and was thus the oldest son of professional wrestler Ray Mendoza. His younger brothers wrestled or wrestle as Villano I (José de Jesús), Villano III (Arturo), Villano V (Raymundo), and Villano IV (Tomás). Villano II has at times been called "the Forgotten Villano", as he is the Villano who achieved the least success in the ring and only wrestled a sporadic schedule for the latter part of his career.

== Professional wrestling career ==
José Alfredo Díaz Mendoza, called Alfredo for short, was the oldest son of professional wrestler Ray Mendoza and grew up watching his father compete as a very successful light heavyweight wrestler. When he and his one-year younger brother José de Jesús were old enough they began training to be wrestlers themselves. Mendoza insisted that both brothers should get a college education to fall back on in case wrestling failed. As Rey Mendoza was still very much in demand all over Mexico, and as a result travelled a lot, Bobby Bonales completed most of the Díaz' training. Both Alfredo and José de Jesús made their professional wrestling debut in 1969, reportedly with their father initially unaware, and began working as a tag team known as Los Bestia Negras ("The Black Beasts"), with José de Jesús working as "Bestia Negra I" and Alfredo as "Bestia Negra II", even though he was older. Later on the team worked as Los Búfalo Salvaje ("The Wild Buffalos") again with José de Jesús as "I" and Alfredo as "II". In 1970, the brothers came up with new ring characters, Los Villanos ("The Villains"), and the name, along with a very distinctive "X" designed mask, stuck with them for the rest of their careers.

Villano I and II held the Distrito Federal Tag Team Championship at one point, although records are unclear on who they defeated for the belts. The brothers began working for Empresa Mexicana de Lucha Libre (EMLL), the same promotion for which their father worked. They were quickly joined by their younger brother Arturo, who became Villano III. Villano I and II won the Arena Coliseo Tag Team Championship in the early 1970s, but did not achieve much else while working for EMLL.

In 1975, Alfredo's father joined with professional wrestling promoter Francisco Flores and investor Benjamín Mora Jr. to form a new professional wrestling promotion called Universal Wrestling Association (UWA), in direct competition with EMLL. One of the reasons behind the split was that Mendoza felt EMLL were not giving his sons enough opportunities in the ring. All three of the Villanos followed their father to the newly formed UWA. While Villano III became a singles competitor and pushed as one of the top stars of the promotion, Villano I and Villano II continued to work as a tag team or as an occasional trio with their younger brother. Villano II began appearing less and less in the wrestling ring as the 1970s wore on, usually explained by the promoters that he was injured. By 1983, Alfredo's younger brothers had taken the names Villano IV and Villano V and became the regular partners of Villano I, leaving Villano II to work only on rare occasions. He wrestled his last match in 1985.

== Personal life ==
Alfredo Mendoza was the firstborn son of José Díaz Velazquez and Guadalupe "Lupita" Mendoza. His brothers, like himself all became professional wrestlers: José de Jesús (Villano I), Arturo (Villano III), Raymundo (Villano V) and Tomás (Villano IV). His mother Lupita died in 1986, his oldest brother José de Jesús died in 2001, and his father José Diaz died on April 16, 2003. Díaz was adamant that his sons get a good education instead of becoming wrestlers, wishing that they become lawyers or doctors as he wanted to spare them the physical suffering he experienced himself. Once he realized that his two oldest sons had begun wrestling under masks, he agreed to train them and help their wrestling careers. He was also instrumental in training the rest of his sons, although he insisted they both get college degrees before they were allowed to begin wrestling. Since his youngest son Tomás finished his education first, he became known as "Villano IV" while Raymundo, the second youngest son, became "Villano V".

== Death ==
Alfredo Díaz died on April 17, 1989, the official cause of death at the time was that he died of injuries suffered in the ring. It was later revealed that due to depression, he had committed suicide by hanging himself at his home in Naucalpan, State of Mexico.

== Championships and accomplishments ==
- Empresa Mexicana de Lucha Libre
  - Arena Coliseo Tag Team Championship (1 time) – with Villano I
  - Mexican National Tag Team Championship (1 time) - with Villano I
  - Distrito Federal Tag Team Championship (1 time) – with Villano I (Note: Championship is sometimes listed as "Estadio de Mexico"/"Mexico State" Tag Team Championship.)
- Other titles
  - Northern Mexico Middleweight Championship (1 time)
- Wrestling Observer Newsletter
  - Wrestling Observer Newsletter Hall of Fame (Class of 2022)

== Luchas de Apuestas record ==
Winner (wager)	Loser (wager)	Location	Event	Date	Notes
Villano II (mask)	El Gitano (mask)	Monterrey	Live Event	1975	
Los Villanos (masks) (Villano I and Villano II)	Scorpio and El Cóndor (masks)	Mexico City	Live event	December 3, 1975	(Note: This was the finals of a Ruleta Rusa, losers advance, Tag Team tournament.)

== See also ==
- List of premature professional wrestling deaths
