= WWA Tag Team Championship (Mexico) =

Professional wrestling tag team championship

WWA World Tag Team Championship (Campeonato Mundial de Parejas WWA)

Details
- Promotion: World Wrestling Association (WWA)
- Date established: May 16, 1991
- Current champion(s): Bestia 666 and Damián 666
- Date won: December 5, 2014
Statistics
- First champion(s): Silver King and El Texano
- Most reigns: Perro Aguayo, Jr. (3 reigns)
- Longest reign: Silver King and El Texano (779 days)
- Shortest reign: Silver King and El Texano (39 days)

The WWA World Tag Team Championship (Campeonato Mundial de Parejas WWA in Spanish) is a Mexican professional wrestling Tag Team championship promoted by the Mexican Lucha Libre wrestling based promotion World Wrestling Association (WWA) since 1991.

As it was a professional wrestling championship, the championship was not won not by actual competition, but by a scripted ending to a match determined by the bookers and match makers. (Note: Hornbaker (2016) p. 550: "Professional wrestling is a sport in which match finishes are predetermined. Thus, win–loss records are not indicative of a wrestler's genuine success based on their legitimate abilities – but on now much, or how little they were pushed by promoters") On occasion the promotion declares a championship vacant, which means there is no champion at that point in time. This can either be due to a storyline, (Note: Duncan & Will (2000) p. 271, Chapter: Texas: NWA American Tag Team Title [World Class, Adkisson] "Championship held up and rematch ordered because of the interference of manager Gary Hart") or real life issues such as a champion suffering an injury being unable to defend the championship, (Note: Duncan & Will (2000) p. 20, Chapter: (United States: 19th Century & widely defended titles – NWA, WWF, AWA, IW, ECW, NWA) NWA/WCW TV Title "Rhodes stripped on 85/10/19 for not defending the belt after having his leg broken by Ric Flair and Ole & Arn Anderson") or leaving the company. (Note: Duncan & Will (2000) p. 201, Chapter: (Memphis, Nashville) Memphis: USWA Tag Team Title "Vacant on 93/01/18 when Spike leaves the USWA.")

It was first won by Silver King and El Texano in a championship tournament held in May 1991. The current champions are Bestia 666 and Damián 666.

== Title history ==
Key
No.	Overall reign number
Reign	Reign number for the specific champion
Days	Number of days held
N/A	Unknown information
†	Championship change is unrecognized by the promotion
+	Current reign is changing daily

No.	Champion	Championship change			Reign statistics		Notes	Ref.
No.	Champion	Date	Event	Location	Reign	Days	Notes	Ref.
1	Los Cowboys (Silver King and El Texano)	May 16, 1991	Live event	Veracruz, Mexico	1	779	Won a championship tournament.	(Note: Duncan & Will (2000) p. 401, Chapter: "Mexico: World Wrestling Association (Benjamin Mora) WWA Tag Team Title")
2	El Dandy and Corazon de Leon	July 21, 1993	Live event	Tlalnepantla, Mexico	1	42		
3	Los Cowboys (Silver King and El Texano)	September 1, 1993	Live event	Mexico City, Mexico	2	39		
4	Los Villanos (Villano IV and Villano V)	October 10, 1993	Live event	Naucalpan, Mexico	1			
—		N/A	—	—				
5	Rey Misterio and Rey Misterio Jr.	1995	Live event	(Note: The location of the title change has not been captured as part of the championship information.)	1	(Note: The exact date on which Rey Misterio and Rey Misterio Jr. won the title is unknown, placing their title reign between 1 and 60 days.)		
6	Fuerza Guerrera and Juventud Guerrera	March 2, 1995	Live event	Jarapa, Mexico	1	(Note: The exact date on which Fuerza and Juventud Guerrero were stripped of the title is unknown, placing their title reign between 183 and 212 days.)		
—	Vacated	September 1995	—	—	—	—	Championship vacated when Fuerza Guerrera left the promotion.	
Championship history is unrecorded from September 1995 to 1997.
7	Los Villanos (Villano IV and Villano V)	1997	Live event		2	(Note: The exact date on which Los Villanos won the title is unknown, placing their title reign between 1 and 161 days.)		
8	Los Brazos (Brazo de Oro and Brazo de Plata)	June 11, 1997	Live event		1	(Note: The exact date on which Los Brazos lost the title is unknown, placing their title reign between 1 and 476 days.)		
Championship history is unrecorded from June 11, 1997 to September 1998.
—	Vacated	September 1998	—	—	—	—	Championship vacated for unknown reasons	
9	El Hijo del Santo and Perro Aguayo Jr.	November 21, 2003	Live event	Tijuana, Mexico	1		Defeated Los Villanos in a tournament final to win the vacant titles.	
9.5	El Hijo del Santo and Rayman			N/A	1		Rayman replaces Perro Aguayo Jr. as one half of the championship team	
10	Último Guerrero and Perro Aguayo Jr. (2)	August 16, 2005	Live event	Puebla, Puebla	1			
10.5		N/A	N/A	N/A			Championship vacated for unknown reasons	
11	Los Perros del Mal (Hector Garza and Perro Aguayo Jr. (3))	January 31, 2008	Live event	Tijuana, Mexico	1		Defeated Dr. Wagner Jr. and Shocker to win the vacant titles.	
—	Vacated	N/A	—	—	—	—	Championship vacated for unknown reasons	
12	Rayo de Jalisco Jr. and Rayman (2)	June 2, 2012	Live event	Tijuana, Mexico	1		Defeated Cien Caras Jr. and Mascara Año 2000 to win the vacant title.	
—	Vacated	N/A	—	—	—	—	Championship vacated for unknown reasons	
13	Bestia 666 and Damián 666	December 5, 2014	Live event	Tijuana, Mexico	1	3,765+	Defeated Rayman and Rey Horuz to win the vacant title.	
