= Villano IV =

Mexican professional wrestler

Personal information
- Born: Tomás Díaz Mendoza; April 9, 1965 (age 61) Tijuana, Mexico
- Parent: Ray Mendoza (father)
- Relatives: Villano I (brother); Villano II (brother); Villano III (brother); Villano V (brother); Villano III Jr. (nephew); El Hijo del Villano III (nephew); Villano V Jr. (nephew); Rokambole Jr. (nephew)

Professional wrestling career
- Ring name(s): Leopardo Negro III; Ray Mendoza Jr. Super Maquina Jr. Villano IV; Villano Cuatro
- Billed height: 1.80 m (5 ft 11 in)
- Billed weight: 100 kg (220 lb)
- Trained by: Ray Mendoza; Villano III
- Debut: December 1982

Tomás Díaz Mendoza (born April 9, 1965), best known by his ring name Villano IV (Spanish: "Villano Cuarto"; English: "Villain the fourth"), is a former Mexican professional wrestler. He has wrestled for promotions Universal Wrestling Association (UWA), Lucha Libre AAA Worldwide (AAA) and World Championship Wrestling (WCW). The other sons of Ray Mendoza who have used the name "Villano" include Villano I, Villano II, Villano III, and Villano V. He is the last surviving member of the Villanos siblings.

== Professional wrestling career ==
Díaz began professional wrestling in 1982, after being taught by his father and his older brother Arturo. He was not given the Villano name on his debut, both his father and his older brothers wanted him to get a college degree and also earn some in-ring experience before he would be allowed to use the Villano name. He spent the first couple of years in wrestling working as various masked characters such as Leopardo Negro III and Super Maquina Jr.

=== Villano IV ===
In 1983, Díaz was finally given the mask and the name of his brothers and became Villano IV. He immediately began teaming with his brothers, especially Villano I and Villano V, and engaged in a heated and very popular feud with the trios team of Los Brazos (Brazo de Plata, Brazo de Oro and El Brazo). On October 21, 1988, Villano I, IV, and V defeated Los Brazos in a Lucha de Apuesta, mask vs. mask match and thus unmasked Los Brazos. Over the years, Villano IV and his brothers have worked for Universal Wrestling Association (UWA), Lucha Libre AAA Worldwide (AAA) and Consejo Mundial de Lucha Libre (CMLL) and with shorter runs with International Wrestling Revolution Group (IWRG) and World Wrestling Association holding tag team and Trios titles in all federations.

=== World Championship Wrestling (1996–2000) ===
Villano IV and V began working for World Championship Wrestling (WCW) as part of the influx of professional wrestlers in 1996. Villano IV made his debut at the 1996 World War 3 event as part of the Three Ring, 60 man battle royal. Subsequently, Los Villanos worked mainly the weekend shows such as WCW World Wide and WCW Saturday Night. The brothers played the role of a heel and would occasionally cheat by switching places while the referee was distracted (all Villanos wore identical attire, aside from their Roman numeral distinctions). Los Villanos made a couple of appearances on WCW's main shows and PPVs such as Villano IV teaming with Konnan and La Parka to defeat Juventud Guerrera, Ciclope, and Super Calo at SuperBrawl VII. They also worked an eight-man tag match at Clash of the Champions XXXV, alongside Psychosis and Silver King against Juventud Guerrera, Super Calo, Héctor Garza and Lizmark Jr. Villano IV also wrestled in WCW, unmasked, under the ring name "Ray Mendoza Jr." (in honor of his father), many years before his brother Villano V began using the ring name in Mexico.

=== Mexico (2000–2023) ===
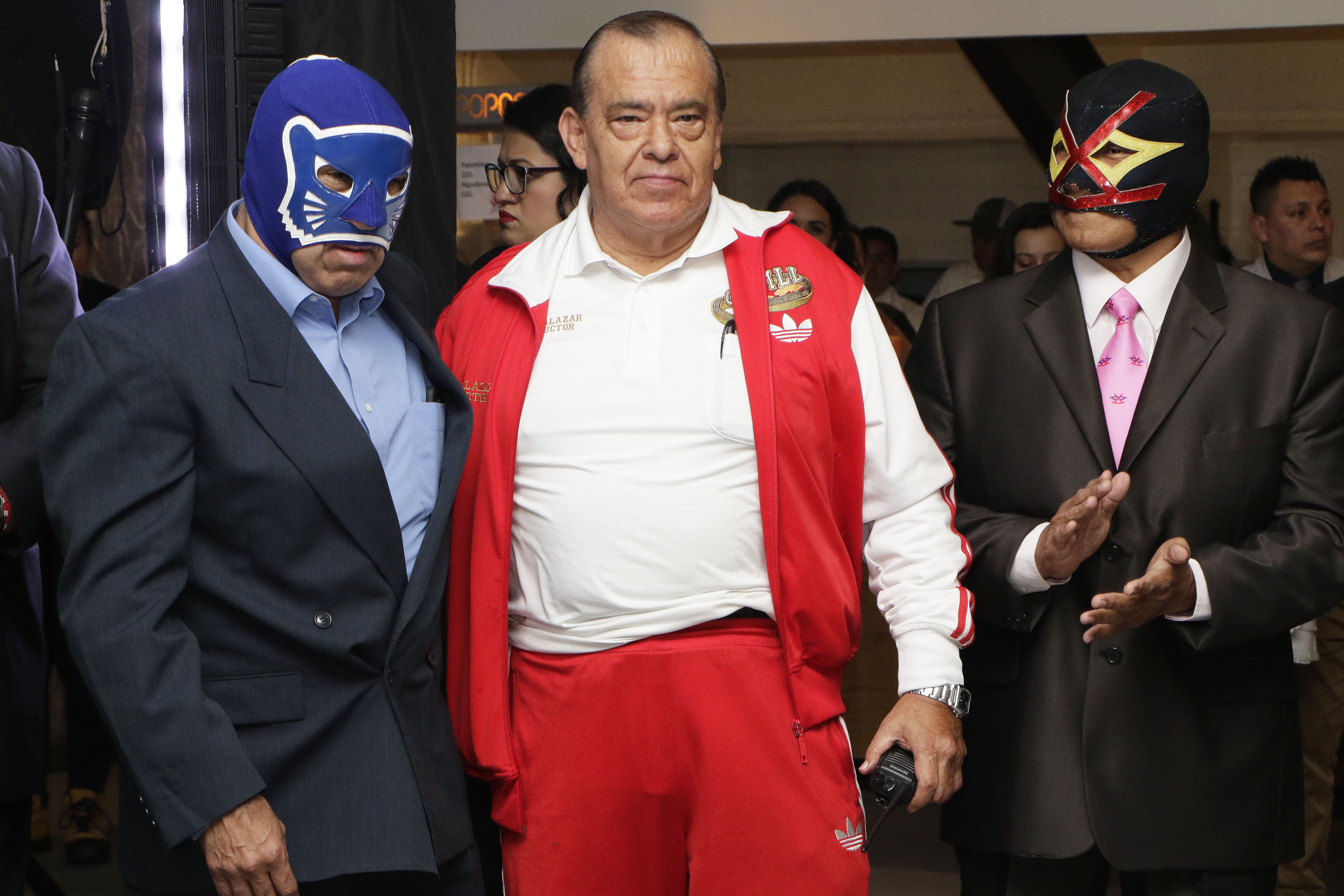
Villano IV (right), with Blue Panther (left) and Tony Salazar (center) at an CMLL event, 2018

Following their stint in WCW, Los Villanos returned full-time to Mexico where they began working for Consejo Mundial de Lucha Libre (CMLL). Villano IV and V assisted their brother in the build-up of a storyline between Villano III and Atlantis, a storyline that reached back to 1999, while Villano IV and V were still working for WCW. The two brothers were in the corner of Villano III as he put his mask on the line against Atlantis in a Lucha de Apuesta at the 2000 Jucio Final final show. On the night Atlantis defeated and unmasked Villano III, the first Villano to be unmasked in the ring. Over the following years, Los Villanos worked both for CMLL and made appearances on the Mexican Independent circuit. In 2008, Villano IV acted as the cornerman for his older brother Villano V as he began a feud with CMLL wrestler Blue Panther. Villano IV was the cornerman for V's biggest Apuesta win as he defeated and unmasked Blue Panther as part of the CMLL 75th Anniversary Show. He was also heavily involved in V's storyline with Último Guerrero in the early 2009, and watched as Villano V was unmasked by Guerrero after an Apuesta match at the 2009 Homenaje a Dos Leyendas. While Villano V worked regularly for CMLL, both Villano III and Villano IV took more independent bookings. On March 12, 2013, AAA announced that Villano IV would be returning to the promotion five days later at Rey de Reyes. This would mark his first appearance for AAA since 1996. On March 16, 2013, he teamed up with older brother Ray Mendoza Jr. to compete in a Ruleta de la Muerte, losers advance tag team tournament to commemorate the retirement of Ray Mendoza Jr. The duo lost to Mil Máscaras and El Mesias in the first round and lost to El Texano Jr. and Súper Nova in the second round, qualifying them for the finals where the losing team would be forced to either unmask (Villano IV) or have their hair shaved off (Mendoza Jr.). The team faced, and defeated, the team of El Hijo de Pirata Morgan and Cassandro which meant El Hijo de Pirata Morgan had to unmask and reveal his birthname, Antheus Ortiz Chávez, while Cassandro had all his hair shaved off as is traditional with Luchas de Apuestas losses. The following day, Villano IV returned to AAA to take part in the 2013 Rey de Reyes tournament. He was the last man eliminated by L. A. Park in his six-way semifinal match, which also included Chessman, Drago, Jack Evans, and Psicosis. On October 15, 2022, Villano IV lost a mask vs. mask match to Pentagon Jr. at Triplemanía XXX, forcing him to unmask after nearly forty years. He retired a few months later in 2023, and became the lucha libre commissioner for Mexico City in 2024.

== Personal life ==
Tomás Díaz Mendoza is the fifth son and eighth and last child overall of José Díaz Velazquez and Guadalupe "Lupita" Mendoza. His brothers, like himself all became professional wrestlers: José de Jesús (Villano I), Alfredo (Villano II), Arturo (Villano III) and Raymundo (Villano V). His mother Lupita died in 1986, his second oldest brother Alfredo died in 1989, his oldest brother José de Jesús died in 2001, and his father José Diaz died on April 16, 2003. Díaz was adamant that his sons get a good education instead of becoming wrestlers, wishing that they become lawyers or doctors as he wanted to spare them the physical suffering he experienced himself. Once he realized that his two oldest sons had begun wrestling under masks he agreed to train them and help their wrestling careers. He was also instrumental in training his youngest two sons, although he insisted they both get college degrees before they were allowed to begin wrestling. Since Tomás finished his education first, he became known as "Villano IV", while Raymundo, the second youngest son, became "Villano V".

== Championships and accomplishments ==
- Asistencia Asesoría y Administración / AAA
  - AAA Americas Trios Championship (2 times) – with Villano III and Villano V
  - Mexican National Atómicos Championship (1 time) – with Villano III, Villano V, and Pierroth Jr.
- Consejo Mundial de Lucha Libre
  - Mexican National Trios Championship (1 time) – with Dos Caras and Villano III
  - Torneo Gran Alternativa: (2003) – with Alan Stone
- International Wrestling Revolution Group
  - IWRG Intercontinental Heavyweight Championship (1 time)
  - IWRG Intercontinental Trios Championship (1 time) – with Villano III and Villano V
  - Rock y Lucha Championship (1 time)
- Pro Wrestling Illustrated
  - PWI ranked him # 142 of the 500 best singles wrestlers of the PWI 500 in 2001.
- Universal Wrestling Association
  - UWA World Tag Team Championship (3 times) – with Villano V
  - UWA World Trios Championship (4 times) – with Villano I and Villano V (4)
  - Naucalpan Tag Team Championship (1 time) – with Kuroneko
- Universal Wrestling Entertainment
  - UWE Tag Team Championship (1 time) – with Ray Mendoza Jr.
- World Wrestling Association
  - WWA World Junior Light Heavyweight Championship (1 time)
  - WWA World Tag Team Championship (1 time) – with Villano V
  - WWA World Trios Championship (1 time) – with Villano III and Villano V
- Wrestling Observer Newsletter
  - Worst Match of the Year (2015) with Villano III and Villano V vs. Monster Clown, Murder Clown and Psycho Clown on August 9
  - Wrestling Observer Newsletter Hall of Fame (Class of 2022)

== Luchas de Apuestas record ==
Winner (wager)	Loser (wager)	Location	Event	Date	Notes
Leopardo Negro II (mask)	Leopardo Negro I (mask)	N/A	Live event	1980s	
Leopardo Negro II (mask)	Luis Mariscal (hair)	Puebla, Puebla	Live event	April 16, 1983	
Villano IV (mask)	Enfermero II (hair)	Nezahualcoyotl, State of Mexico	Live event	August 21, 1983	
Villano IV (mask)	Emilio Charles Jr. (hair)	Xalapa, Veracruz	Live event	September 29, 1983	
Villano IV (mask)	Loco Zandokan (mask)	Naucalpan, Mexico State	Live event	January 31, 1988	
Los Villanos (masks) (Villano I, IV and V)	Los Brazos (masks) (Brazo de Oro, Brazo de Plata, and El Brazo)	Monterrey, Nuevo León	Live event	October 21, 1988	
Villano IV (mask)	El Engendro (mask)	Naucalpan, State of Mexico	Live event	February 3, 1991	
Los Villanos (masks) (Villano I, IV and V)	Los Mercenarios Americanos (masks) (Tim Patterson, Bill Anderson and Louie Spicolli)	Tijuana, Baja California	Live event	July 19, 1991	
Villano IV (mask)	Tigre Canadiense (mask)	Naucalpan, State of Mexico	Live event	October 20, 1991	
Villano IV (mask)	Brazo de Oro (hair)	Acapulco, Guerrero	Live event	November 20, 2004	(Note: Los Brazos vs. Los Villanos steel cage match.)
Villano IV (mask)	Hombre Bala (hair)	Mexico City, Mexico	Live event	July 1, 2009	
Villano IV (mask) and Ray Mendoza Jr. (hair)	Hijo de Pirata Morgan (mask) and Cassandro (hair)	Naucalpan, Mexico State	Rey Mendoza Jr. retirement show	March 16, 2013	(Note: Finals of a Ruleta de la Muerte tournament.)
Pentagón Jr. (mask)	Villano IV (mask)	Mexico City, Mexico	Triplemanía XXX	October 15, 2022	(Note: Finals of a Ruleta de la Muerte tournament.)
