= Villano V =

Mexican professional wrestler (1962–2024)

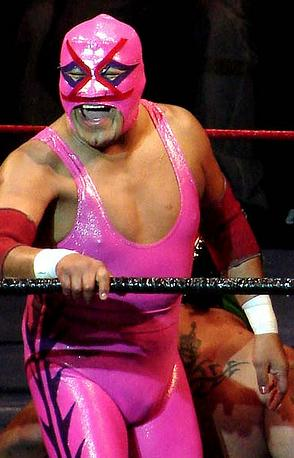
- Villano V in 2006

Personal information
- Born: Raymundo Díaz Mendoza; March 22, 1962 Mexico City, Mexico
- Died: August 29, 2024 (aged 62)
- Children: 2
- Parent: Ray Mendoza (father)
- Relatives: Villano I (brother); Villano II (brother); Villano III (brother); Villano IV (brother); Villano III Jr. (nephew); El Hijo del Villano III (nephew)

Professional wrestling career
- Ring name(s): Ray Mendoza Jr. Rokambole; Villano V Villano Quinto
- Billed height: 1.73 m (5 ft 8 in)
- Billed weight: 100 kg (220 lb)
- Billed from: Mexico City, Mexico
- Trained by: Ray Mendoza; Villano I
- Debut: March 15, 1975
- Retired: 2017

Raymundo Díaz Mendoza (March 22, 1962 – August 29, 2024), best known by his ring name Villano V (Spanish: "Villano Quinto"; English: "Villain the fifth"), was a Mexican professional wrestler. Following his unmasking in 2009, he worked under the ring name Ray Mendoza Jr., as a tribute to his father Ray Mendoza.

Díaz was part of a well-known Mexican professional wrestling family that includes four other Villanos, I, II, III and IV. Since making his debut in 1975, Díaz wrestled for every major Mexican professional wrestling promotion, including Universal Wrestling Association (UWA), Lucha Libre AAA Worldwide (AAA) and Consejo Mundial de Lucha Libre (CMLL). He also worked for the United States–based World Championship Wrestling (WCW) as enhancement talent, usually appearing on secondary shows like WCW Saturday Night.

== Professional wrestling career ==
=== Early career (1975–1983) ===
Raymundo Díaz Mendoza was the son of Ray Mendoza, a well known Mexican professional wrestler and wrestling trainer and the brother of Villano I (José de Jesús Díaz Mendoza), Villano II (José Alfredo Díaz Mendoza), Villano III (Arturo Díaz Mendoza), and Villano IV (Tomás Díaz Mendoza). Trained by his father and oldest brother, he was not allowed to use the Villano name until he finished his education. Because Díaz's younger brother finished his degree faster than him, he was known as "V" (or 5), even though he is the fourth son of Ray Mendoza. In May 1976, Díaz made his professional wrestling debut using the name "Rokambole" (originally used by his older brother Arturo before he became Villano III). Mendoza worked for several years under this name, gaining experience without the pressure of the Villano name.

=== Mexican promotions (1983–1996) ===
In September 1983, Díaz finally took the mask and the name of his brothers and became Villano V. He immediately began teaming with his brothers, especially Villano I and Villano IV and engaged in a heated and very popular feud with the trios team of Los Brazos (Brazo de Plata, Brazo de Oro and El Brazo). On October 21, 1988, Villano I, IV, and V defeated Los Brazos in a mask vs. mask match and thus unmasked Los Brazos. Over the years, Villano V and his brothers worked for Universal Wrestling Association (UWA), Lucha Libre AAA Worldwide (AAA) and Consejo Mundial de Lucha Libre (CMLL) and with shorter runs with International Wrestling Revolution Group (IWRG) and World Wrestling Association holding tag team and trios titles in all federations.

=== World Championship Wrestling (1996–2000) ===
Villano IV and V began working for World Championship Wrestling (WCW) as part of the influx of Mexican professional wrestlers in 1996. Villano V made his debut at the 1996 World War 3 event as part of the Three Ring, 60 man battle royal. Subsequently, Los Villanos worked mainly the weekend shows such as WCW World Wide and WCW Saturday Night. The brothers played the role of a heel and would occasionally cheat by switching places while the referee was distracted (all Villanos wore identical attire, aside from their Roman numeral distinctions). Los Villanos made a couple of appearances on WCW's main shows and PPVs such as Villano IV teaming with Konnan and La Parka to defeat Juventud Guerrera, Ciclope and Super Calo at SuperBrawl VII. They also worked an eight-man tag match at Clash of the Champions XXXV, alongside Psychosis and Silver King against Guerrera, Super Calo, Héctor Garza and Lizmark Jr. While working in WCW, Villano IV suffered a neck injury as a result of a failed move by Kanyon and Raven. The injury threatened to force Villano IV into retirement, but he was able to recover and was back teaming with Villano V in WCW in 2000.

=== Mexican promotions (2000–2017) ===
At the CMLL 75th Anniversary Show on September 19, 2008, Villano V defeated longtime rival Blue Panther in a mask vs. mask match to unmask Panther after 30 years of wearing the mask. The ending was very popular with the vocal crowd at Arena Mexico prompting them to throw money into the ring (a tradition in Mexico after a great match). On March 20, 2009, Villano V lost a mask vs. mask match against Último Guerrero on the Homenaje a Dos Leyendas show and was forced to unmask and reveal his real name as per Lucha Libre traditions. Since losing his mask Villano V regularly wrestles under the ring name "Ray Mendoza Jr." in honor of his father. His brother Villano IV had also wrestled under the name Ray Mendoza Jr. briefly in WCW many years before. He, along with his brothers Villano III and Villano IV were on hand for the 2010 Homenaje a Dos Leyendas show where CMLL honored their father Ray Mendoza with an in-ring ceremony. On September 20, 2012, Mendoza Jr. made his debut for the Japanese Wrestling New Classic (WNC) promotion, when he was defeated by Dave Finlay in the main event at Tokyo's Korakuen Hall. Two days later in Osaka, Mendoza Jr. defeated Tajiri in another main event.

Mendoza announced that he would be retiring in early 2013, with a show on March 16, 2013, as his last professional wrestling appearance. The main event of the show was a Ruleta de la Muerta tag team tournament, where the losing teams advance instead of the winners and the team that loses in the main event would have to wrestle against each other to determine who would unmask. The teams for the Ruleta de la Muerta were announced as Ray Mendoza Jr. and Villano IV, El Mesias and Mil Máscaras, Máscara Año 2000 and Rayo de Jalisco Jr., Casandro and Hijo de Pirata Morgan, Cien Caras and Dr. Wagner Jr., L. A. Park and Universo 2000, and El Solar and Toscano. The Villano duo lost to Máscaras and El Mesias in the first round and lost to El Texano Jr. and Súper Nova in the second round qualifying them for the finals where the losing team would be forced to either unmask (Villano IV) or have their hair shaved off (Mendoza Jr.). The team faced, and defeated the team of El Hijo de Pirata Morgan and Cassandro which meant El Hijo de Pirata Morgan had to unmask and reveal his birthname, Antheus Ortiz Chávez, while Cassandro had all his hair shaved off as is traditional with Luchas de Apuestas losses. The undercard featured a match with Ray Mendoza Jr.'s sons Kaving and Kortiz, teaming with Dr. Cerebro and Cerebro Negro losing to the team of Eita, Fénix, Freelance, and Mike Segura. On March 21, 2013, only 4 days after his official retirement show Ray Mendoza Jr. was announced as working on CMLL's Arena Coliseo 70th Anniversary Show on April 7, claiming that due to poor attendance for his retirement show he personally lost $38,000 promoting the show and thus was forced to return to wrestling to make that money back. On June 16, Mendoza returned to AAA at Triplemanía XXI, challenging El Texano Jr. to a future match for the AAA Mega Championship.

== Personal life ==
Raymundo Díaz Mendoza was the fourth son and seventh child overall of José Díaz Velazquez and Guadalupe "Lupita" Mendoza. His brothers, like himself all became wrestlers: José de Jesús (Villano I), Alfredo (Villano II), Arturo (Villano III) and Tomás (Villano IV). His mother Lupita died in 1986, his second oldest brother Alfredo died in 1989, his oldest brother José de Jesús died in 2001 and his father José Diaz died on April 16, 2003. Díaz was adamant that his sons get a good education instead of becoming wrestlers, wishing that they become lawyers or doctors as he wanted to spare them the physical suffering he experienced himself. Once he realized that his two oldest sons had begun wrestling under masks he agreed to train them and help their wrestling careers. He was also instrumental in training his youngest two sons, although he insisted they both get college degrees before they were allowed to begin wrestling. Since his youngest son Tomás finished his education first he became known as "Villano IV" while Raymundo, the second youngest son, became "Villano V". Mendoza has two sons, who are also professional wrestlers, the two began their careers as the masked characters Kortiz, and Kaving. Mendoza's nephews (sons of Arturo Mendoza) wrestle as Villano III Jr. and El Hijo del Villano III. On June 6, 2017, Mendoza introduced Villano V Jr., his oldest son who had worked as "Kaving" up until that point, to the public after the young luchador was officially licensed under the name and presented him with the distinctive Villano mask.

Díaz died on August 29, 2024, at the age of 62.

== Championships and accomplishments ==
- Asistencia Asesoría y Administración / AAA
  - AAA Americas Trios Championship (2 times) – with Villano III and Villano IV
  - Mexican National Atómicos Championship (1 time) – with Villano III, Villano IV and Pierroth Jr.
- International Wrestling Revolution Group (Grupo Internacional Revolucion)
  - IWRG Intercontinental Trios Championship (1 time) – with Villano III and Villano IV
  - Copa Higher Power (2003)
- Pro Wrestling Illustrated
  - PWI ranked him # 112 of the 500 best singles wrestlers of the PWI 500 in 1998.
- Universal Wrestling Association
  - UWA World Light Heavyweight Championship (2 times)
  - UWA World Tag Team Championship (3 times) – with Villano IV
  - UWA World Trios Championship (5 times) – with Villano I and Villano IV (4), Scorpio Jr. and Shu El Guerrero (1)
- Universal Wrestling Entertainment
  - UWE Tag Team Championship (1 time, current) – with Villano IV
- World Wrestling Association
  - WWA World Tag Team Championship (1 time) – with Villano IV
  - WWA World Trios Championship (1 time) – with Villano III and Villano IV
- Wrestling Observer Newsletter
  - Worst Match of the Year (2015) with Villano III and Villano IV vs. Monster Clown, Murder Clown and Psycho Clown on August 9
  - Wrestling Observer Newsletter Hall of Fame (Class of 2022)

== Luchas de Apuestas record ==
| Winner (wager) | Loser (wager) | Location | Event | Date | Notes |
|---|---|---|---|---|---|
| Rokambole (mask) | Perro Sosa (hair) | Mexico City | Live event | February 12, 1977 | |
| Rokambole (mask) | Bronco (hair) | Toluca, Mexico State | Live event | March 27, 1977 | |
| Rokambole (mask) | Cuervo Blanco (hair) | Moctezuma, Mexico State | Live event | October 1977 | |
| Rokambole (mask) | Perro Sosa (hair) | Mexico City | Live event | December 17, 1977 | |
| Rokambole (mask) | Super Libre (mask) | Puebla, Puebla | Live event | May 12, 1978 | |
| Rokambole (mask) | Comanche (hair) | Mexico City | Live event | June 13, 1978 | |
| Rokambole (mask) | Azcasgary (hair) | Tuxtla Gutierrez, Chiapas | Live event | August 13, 1978 | |
| Rokambole (mask) | Caballero Negro (hair) | Xalapa, Veracruz | Live event | December 14, 1978 | |
| Rokambole (mask) | Socio (mask) | Acapulco, Guerrero | Live event | January 6, 1980 | |
| Rokambole (mask) | Jose Luis Mendieta (hair) | Mexico City | Live event | May 1980 | |
| Rokambole (mask) | Huichol Tapatío (hair) | Querétaro, Querétaro | Live event | March 20, 1980 | |
| Rokambole (mask) | Castorcito (hair) | Mexico City | Live event | June 1980 | |
| Rokambole (mask) | Guerrero Negro (hair) | Celaya, Guanajuato | Live event | September 21, 1980 | |
| Los Villanos (mask) (Villano I, Villano IV and Villano V) | Los Brazos (mask) (Brazo de Plata, Brazo de Oro and El Brazo) | Monterrey, Nuevo León | Live event | October 21, 1988 | |
| Los Villanos (mask); Villano I, Villano IV and Villano V | Mercenarios Americanos (mask); Tim Patterson, Louie Spicolli and Bill Anderson | Tijuana, Baja California | Live event | July 19, 1991 | |
| Villano V (mask) | Blue Panther (mask) | Mexico City | CMLL 75th Anniversary Show | September 19, 2008 | |
| Último Guerrero (mask) | Villano V (mask) | Mexico City | Homenaje a Dos Leyendas | March 20, 2009 | |
| Ray Mendoza, Jr. (hair) | Brazo de Platino (hair) | Nezahualcoyotl, State of Mexico | Live event | March 3, 2012 | (Note: Last two wrestlers in a steel cage match) |
| Villano IV (mask) and Ray Mendoza Jr. (hair) | Hijo de Pirata Morgan (mask) and Cassandro (hair) | Naucalpan, Mexico State | Rey Mendoza Jr. retirement show | March 16, 2013 | (Note: Finals of a Ruleta de la Muerte tournament) |
| Ray Mendoza Jr. (hair), Kaving (mask) and Kortiz (mask) | Tony Rivera, Dr. Killer Jr. and Ciclon Black (hair) | Los Reyes la Paz | live event | November 28, 2014 | |
| Ray Mendoza Jr. (hair) | Mr. Elektro (hair) | Naucalpan, Mexico State | 55th Anniversary of Lucha Libre in Estado de México | December 3, 2017 | |
