= Villano I =

Mexican professional wrestler (1950 – 2001)

Personal information
- Born: José de Jesús Díaz Mendoza; June 28, 1950 Mexico City, Mexico
- Died: January 4, 2001 (aged 50) Mexico City, Mexico
- Spouse: Delia Valero
- Children: 2
- Parent: Ray Mendoza (father)
- Relatives: Villano II (brother); Villano III (brother); Villano V (brother); Villano IV (brother); Villano III Jr. (nephew); El Hijo del Villano III (nephew)

Professional wrestling career
- Ring name(s): Bestia Negra I Búfalo Salvaje I Toro Bill; El Villano; Villano I
- Billed height: 1.75 m (5 ft 9 in)
- Billed weight: 88 kg (194 lb)
- Trained by: Ray Mendoza; Bobby Bonales; Perdo Nieves
- Debut: 1969
- Retired: 1997

José de Jesús Díaz Mendoza (June 28, 1950 – January 4, 2001), best known by his ring name Villano I (Spanish: "Villano Primero"; English: "Villain the first"), was a Mexican professional wrestler. He was the son of professional wrestler Ray Mendoza, and the first of the five Díaz brothers to become a professional wrestler, although not the oldest. His elder brother Alfredo wrestled as Villano II until his death in 1989, while his younger brothers wrestled under the names Villano III (Arturo), Villano V (Raymundo) and Villano IV (Tomás).

== Professional wrestling career ==
José de Jesús Díaz Mendoza was the second son of professional wrestler Ray Mendoza and grew up watching his father compete as a very successful light heavyweight wrestler. When he and his elder brother Alfredo were old enough they began training to be wrestlers themselves, Mendoza insisted that both brothers should get a college education to fall back on in case wrestling failed. As Mendoza was still very much in demand all over Mexico and thus travelled a lot, Bobby Bonales was responsible for most of the Díaz's training. Both José de Jesús and Alfredo made their professional wrestling debut in 1969, reportedly without their father knowing about it initially, and began working as a tag team known as Los Bestia Negras ("The Black Beasts"), with José de Jesús working as "Bestia Negra I" and Alfredo as "Bestia Negra II", even though Alfredo was older. Later on the team worked as Los Búfalo Salvaje ("The Wild Buffalos") again with José de Jesús as "I" and Alfredo as "II". In 1970, José de Jesús worked as "El Villano", soon renamed "Villano I" as the brothers became Los Villanos ("The Villains"); the name, along with a very distinctive "X" designed mask, stuck with them for the rest of their careers. Villano I and II held the Distrito Federal Tag Team Championship at one point, although records are unclear on who they defeated for the championship. The brothers began working for Empresa Mexicana de Lucha Libre (EMLL), the same promotion for which their father worked. Soon they were joined by their younger brother Arturo, who became Villano III. Villano I and II won the Arena Coliseo Tag Team Championship in the early 1970s, but did not achieve much else while working for EMLL.

In 1975, José de Jesús' father joined with wrestling promoter Francisco Flores and investor Benjamín Mora Jr. to form a new wrestling promotion called Universal Wrestling Association (UWA), in direct competition with EMLL. One of the reasons behind the split was that Mendoza felt EMLL were not giving his sons enough opportunities in the ring. All three of the Villanos followed their father to the newly formed UWA. While Villano III became a singles competitor and pushed as one of the top stars of the promotion, Villano I and Villano II continued to work as a tag team or as an occasional trio with their younger brother. Villano II began appearing less and less in the wrestling ring as the 1970s wore on, usually explained by the promoters that he was injured. By 1983 José de Jesús' younger brothers had taken the names Villano IV and Villano V and became the regular partners of Villano I. On August 10, 1986, Villano I won his first ever singles championship as he defeated Fishman to win the UWA World Light Heavyweight Championship, a title both his father and his younger brother Villano III had previously held. He reigned as champion for 160 days before being defeated by Zandokan. Villano I along with Villano IV and V won the UWA World Trios Championship in 1988, although it is not confirmed who they defeated for the title. Los Villanos also became embroiled in a storyline feud with another wrestling family known as Los Brazos ("The Arms"), in this case the three oldest brothers Brazo de Oro, Brazo de Plata, and El Brazo. The feud saw the trios clash several times, usually with at least one or more of the participants bleeding when the match was over. The feud between the two families led to a Lucha de Apuesta (mask vs. mask match), between the two sets of siblings. On October 21, 1988, in Monterrey, Nuevo León, Los Villanos defeated Los Brazos and forced them to unmask after the match. This was the biggest Apuesta win of Villano I's career and one of the biggest Apuetas matches in Lucha Libre. Los Villanos regained the UWA Trios Championship in 1990, but lost the title to Los Brazos a few months later. The protracted feud between Los Villanos and Los Brazos saw Villano I defeat El Brazo in an Apuesta match where El Brazo's hair was on the line. Following the match, Villano I watched as El Brazo was shaved bald. Later on Los Villanos regained the Trios title from Los Brazos. In early 1991, Los Villanos became involved in a feud with The Hawaiian Beasts (Fatu, Great Kokina, and The Samoan Savage). The Trios traded the title on April 7, 1991, and then back again on May 31, 1991. Los Villanos' fourth and final reign as UWA World Trios Champions lasted 275 days and ended when they were defeated by Black Power II, Negro Navarro and El Signo. On July 19, 1991, Los Villanos defeated Los Mercenarios Americanos (Mercenario I, Mercenario II and Mercenario III) in an Apuesta match to unmask them. This ended up being Villano I's last major in-ring success as he began focusing more on training wrestlers at UWA's school than wrestling. When the UWA closed in January 1995, Villano quietly retired from professional wrestling.

== Personal life ==
José de Jesús Díaz Mendoza was the second son of José Díaz Velazquez and Guadalupe "Lupita" Mendoza. His brothers, like himself all became wrestlers: Alfredo (Villano II), Arturo (Villano III), Raymundo (Villano V) and Tomás (Villano IV). His mother Lupita died in 1986, his older brother Alfredo died in 1989, and his father José Diaz died on April 16, 2003. Díaz was adamant that his sons get a good education instead of becoming wrestlers, wishing that they become lawyers or doctors as he wanted to spare them the physical suffering he experienced himself. Once he realized that his two oldest sons had begun wrestling under masks he agreed to train them and help their wrestling careers. He was also instrumental in training the rest of his sons, although he insisted they both get college degrees before they were allowed to begin professional wrestling. Since his youngest son Tomás finished his education first, he became known as "Villano IV" while Raymundo, the second youngest son, became "Villano V". José de Jesús was married to Delia Valero, daughter of an influential professional wrestling magazine writer/owner, and together the couple had two daughters, Alma Guadalupe and Blanca Olivia.

== Death ==
In late 2000, José de Jesús Díaz had undergone brain surgery for a blood clot caused by the hard bumps taken during his professional wrestling career. In the days leading up to January 4, 2001, he had been talking about getting back in shape for a retirement match but his health took a turn for the worse on January 4. The official cause of the death was a heart attack caused by a cerebral haemorrhage. He was buried the next day, wearing the Villano mask and a cape with the UWA logo on it. The funeral was attended by a number of luchadors, including the Brazos family, Perro Aguayo, Cien Caras, Universo 2000, El Felino, Ringo Mendoza, and others.

== Championships and accomplishments ==
- Empresa Mexicana de Lucha Libre
  - Arena Coliseo Tag Team Championship (1 time) – with Villano II
  - Mexican National Tag Team Championship (1 time) - with Villano II
  - Distrito Federal Heavyweight Championship (1 time)
  - Distrito Federal Tag Team Championship (1 time) – with Villano II (Note: is sometimes listed as "Estadio de Mexico"/"Mexico State".)
- Universal Wrestling Association
  - Toreo de Cuatro Caminos Trios Championship (1 time) – Unknown partners
  - UWA World Light Heavyweight Championship (1 time)
  - UWA World Trios Championship (3 times) – with Villano IV and Villano V
- Mexican local promotions
  - Plaza de Toros La Aurora Middleweight Championship (1 time)
- Wrestling Observer Newsletter
  - Wrestling Observer Newsletter Hall of Fame (Class of 2022)

== Luchas de Apuestas record ==
Winner (wager)	Loser (wager)	Location	Event	Date	Notes
Villano I (mask)	Toño De La Cruz (hair)	Aurora, Mexico	Live event	N/A	
Villano I (mask)	Babe Sharon (hair)	N/A	Live event	N/A	
Villano I (mask)	Javier Meza (hair)	Aurora, Mexico	Live event	N/A	
Villano I (mask)	Joe Franco (hair)	Aurora, Mexico	Live event	N/A	
Villano I (mask)	Pedro Nieves (hair)	N/A	Live event	N/A	
Villano I (mask)	Luis Mariscal (hair)	N/A	Live event	N/A	
Villano I (mask)	El Infernal I (mask)	Naucalpan, State of Mexico	Live event	February 11, 1975	
Los Villanos (masks) (Villano I and Villano II)	Scorpio and El Cóndor (mask)	Mexico City	Live event	December 3, 1975	(Note: This was the finals of a Ruleta Rusa, losers advance, Tag Team tournament.)
Villano I (mask)	Johnny Lezcano (hair)	Veracruz, Veracruz	Live event	February 18, 1976	
Villano I (mask)	Zorro Plateado (mask)	Mexico City	Live event	1977	
Villano I (mask)	El Cachorro (mask)	Tehuacán, Puebla	Live event	July 11, 1977	
Villano I (mask)	Azteca de Oro (mask)	Naucalpan, State of Mexico	Live event	May 27, 1979	
Villano I (mask)	Gorila Infernal (hair)	Xalapa, Veracruz	Live event	August 11, 1983	
Villano I (mask)	El Broncas (mask)	Naucalpan, State of Mexico	Live event	October 21, 1986	
Los Villanos (masks) (Villano I, Villano IV and Villano V)	Los Brazos (masks) (Brazo de Oro, Brazo de Plata and El Brazo)	Monterrey, Nuevo León	Live event	October 21, 1988	
Villano I (mask)	El Brazo (hair)	Naucalpan, State of Mexico	Live event	November 16, 1990	
Los Villanos (masks) (Villano I, Villano IV and Villano V)	Los Mercenarios Americanos (masks) (Mercenario I, Mercenario II and Mercenario III)	Tijuana, Baja California	Live event	July 19, 1991	
