= Ray Mendoza =

Mexican professional wrestler

Personal information
- Born: José Díaz Velázquez; July 6, 1929 Mexico City, Mexico
- Died: April 16, 2003 (aged 73) Naucalpan, Mexico
- Spouse: Lupita Mendoza (m. 1944–1986)
- Children: 8, including Villano I, Villano II, Villano III, Villano IV and Villano V
- Relatives: Villano III Jr. (grandson); El Hijo del Villano III (grandson)

Professional wrestling career
- Ring name(s): Chato Ortiz "Indio" Mendoza; El Hombre del Rayo Rojo; El Rayo Rojo; Gargantua; Ray Mendoza
- Billed height: 1.78 m (5 ft 10 in)
- Billed weight: 100 kg (220 lb)
- Trained by: Juan Espinoza (boxing); Ray Carrasco; Rogelio de la Paz; Genaro Contreas; Raul Rojas; Daniel García
- Debut: 1954
- Retired: 1983

José Díaz Velázquez (July 6, 1929 – April 16, 2003), better known by his ring name Ray Mendoza, was a Mexican professional wrestler. After working for Empresa Mexicana de Lucha Libre (EMLL), Mendoza had great success in the National Wrestling Alliance (NWA), where he was a five-time World Light Heavyweight Champion, as well as the first Mexican to hold the championship. In 1975, he helped establish Universal Wrestling Association (UWA), with Francisco Flores and Benjamín Mora Jr.

During his many title reigns, Mendoza faced many present or future stars, such as Gran Hamada, Killer Kowalski, John Tolos, El Solitario, Fishman, René Guajardo, Gory Guerrero, El Santo, and Cavernario Galindo. He also appeared in a number of luchador films. Mendoza was the father of Los Villanos, Villano I, Villano II, Villano III, Villano IV, and Villano V, and the grandfather of Villano III Jr., El Hijo del Villano III (both sons of III), Villano V Jr., and Rokambole Jr. (both sons of V).

== Biography ==
José Díaz Velazquez was born on July 6, 1929, and grew up in the Tepito district of Mexico City, a very poor and violent neighborhood. Díaz never finished any formal education as he had to start earning a living at a very early age to support himself and his wife Lupita Mendoza, whom he married when he was just 15 years old. While working in a bakery, Díaz also worked hard to keep in shape, participating in cycling, swimming and baseball.

=== Boxing career ===
Díaz decided to become a professional boxer and made his debut in 1950, keeping his day job in the bakery as well. Díaz boxed under name "Joe Díaz", a shortened version of his real name. At one point, he had a sparring session with a couple of professional wrestlers, as he was told not to spar with any of the boxers at the gym. The luchadors wanted to teach the boxer a lesson and ended up injuring Díaz's back with a knee drop. The back injury later forced Díaz to retire, after only 20 matches. Following his retirement, he began working as a health inspector for the Mexico City county.

=== Professional wrestling career ===
Despite being forced to retire from professional boxing, Díaz kept in shape by lifting weights at a local gym. The gym owner was impressed with Díaz's physique and work ethics and recommended he become a professional wrestler. Díaz was originally trained by Ray Carrasco and later also trained under Rogelio de la Paz, Genaro Contreas, Raul Rojas and Daniel García; the latter would later be famous under the name of "Huracán Ramírez". Díaz made his professional wrestling debut in 1954, using the ring name "El Pelón" (Spanish for "Baldy") Chato Díaz, then later on worked under names such as "Indio" Mendoza, El Rayo Rojo and El Hombre del Rayo Rojo. He also worked for a while as an masked character called Gargantua between 1954 and 1955. In 1955, Díaz came up with the ring name "Ray Mendoza", after his mentor Ray Carrasco and his wife's maiden name Mendoza. As Mendoza, he quickly forged a very effective rudo character ("bad guy") by using well developed physique and charisma to create a ring character that the fans loved to hate. In 1956, Mendoza began working for Salvador Lutteroth's Empresa Mexicana de Lucha Libre (EMLL), the world's oldest and Mexico's largest wrestling promotion. He made his debut at EMLL's main arena Arena Coliseo in February 1956 in a battle royal that also included EMLL headliners Gory Guerrero, El Santo, Cavernario Galindo, Blue Demon and Black Shadow, a match that immediately established him as someone who Lutteroth saw potential in. In EMLL, Mendoza struck up a friendship with René Guajardo and Karloff Lagarde out of the ring and a "partnership in crime" in the ring as the three became one of the most hated trio in professional wrestling at the time. The three drew full houses all over Mexico, setting box office record after box office record as they faced técnicos ("good guy") such as El Santo, Rayo de Jalisco or Blue Demon. They also had a very financially successful feud with Los Espantos (Espanto I, Espanto II, and Espanto III) in what at the time was a rare rudo vs. rudo feud. Outside the ring Mendoza, Guajardo and Lagarde often spoke out on behalf of the wrestlers, demanding higher pay and better conditions, and since they were able to generate a lot of ticket sales, EMLL officials listened to their demands.

In 1959, Mendoza won his first championship, defeating Dory Dixon to win the NWA World Light Heavyweight Championship. This marked the first time the NWA Light Heavyweight title was held by a Mexican and helped establish the title as the top title in Mexico from 1959 until the mid-1980s. Over the years, Mendoza would become synonymous with the NWA World Light Heavyweight Championship as he held it a record six times. During those title reigns, he worked a legendary feud against Gory Guerrero, a feud between two of the most influential, unmasked wrestlers of the golden age of professional wrestling in Mexico. In 1965, Mendoza's in-ring success helped make him very popular with the fans, so popular it was decided to turn him técnico. His first feud as a técnico was against his old partners Guajardo and Lagarde. First, Mendoza defeated Lagarde in a Lucha de Apuesta ("bet match"), hair vs. hair match. Matches between Mendoza, Guajardo and Lagarde drew full houses all over country, including a record breaking show where Guajardo defeated Mendoza in a Lucha de Apuesta match, the show drew the largest gate of that year and one of the best gates in Mexico in the 1960s. Guajardo and Mendoza also feuded over the NWA World Middleweight Championship, although once Mendoza won it, he vacated it to focus on the Light Heavyweight division. In the late 1960s and early 1970s, Mendoza would often work in the United States, working for the Southern California based NWA Hollywood. Here he held the NWA Americas Tag Team Championship on three occasions, teaming with Mil Máscaras, Raul Mata and Raul Reyes. In the late 1960s, Mendoza helped launch the career of Ringo Mendoza, who was not related to Mendoza, but was allowed to use the last name as he bore a resemblance to Mendoza. Years later, Mendoza was instrumental in the careers of his sons who wrestled as Villano I, Villano II, and Villano III.

=== Universal Wrestling Association ===
In 1974, Salvador Lutteroth Jr. began working for EMLL, being groomed to take over after his father. Mendoza was already unhappy with the lack of attention his sons were getting in EMLL as well as the very rigid and conservative way of running show; when Lutteroth Jr. was brought in Mendoza's loyalty to Lutteroth Sr. ended. Mendoza vacated the NWA World Light Heavyweight Championship and along with Guajardo and Lagarde resigned from EMLL. They joined up with promoter Francisco Flores and investor Benjamín Mora Jr. to form a rival promotion called Lucha Libre Internacional, later globally known as the Universal Wrestling Association (UWA). Headlined by Mendoza, Guajardo, and Largede as well as disgruntled former EMLL wrestlers, UWA held their first show on January 29, 1975, creating the first true rival for EMLL in decades. Since Mendoza had been synonymous with the Light Heavyweight division throughout the 1960s and 1970s, it was not a great surprise that he became the first UWA World Light Heavy Champion, although at this point in his career, he was used more to help wrestlers such as El Solitario and Gran Hamada gain credibility as they defeated Mendoza for the title. Mendoza also spent a lot of time guiding the careers of his three youngest sons Villano I, II, and III who were quickly gaining fame in the UWA. By the end of the 1970s, Mendoza was all but retired, with his last headliner match being a championship match against WWWF Junior Heavyweight Champion Tatsumi Fujinami, a match that was Mendoza's last true headliner match.

==== Retirement ====
Mendoza announced his retirement in late 1982 and following a retirement tour of Mexico and Panama, he retired from in-ring action in early 1983. He would later work as a referee for special UWA matches, adding to the "big event" feel by having Mendoza oversee the action. He also trained various wrestlers at the UWA school along with his son VIllano I, Lagarde and Felipe Ham Lee, training wrestlers up until the UWA closed in 1995. In 1988, he was made the head commissioner of the Mexico City Boxing and Wrestling commission, charged with relegating boxing and wrestling events in Mexico, licensing wrestlers and approving mask matches and the likes.

== Personal life ==
Díaz married Lupita Mendoza when he was just 15 and the two remained married until she died in 1986. Together the couple had eight children, three daughters, Rita Marina, Leonor and Lupita and five sons who all became luchadors; José Alfredo (Villano II), José de Jesús (Villano I), Arturo (Villano III), Raymundo (Villano V) and Tomás (Villano IV). After his unmasking in 2009, Raymundo was often billed as "Ray Mendoza Jr." after his father. Mendoza was originally adamant that his sons get a good education instead of becoming wrestlers, wishing that they become lawyers or doctors as he wanted to spare them the physical suffering he experienced himself. Once he realized that his two oldest sons had begun wrestling under masks, he agreed to train them and help their wrestling careers. He was also instrumental in training his youngest two sons, although he insisted they both get college degrees before they were allowed to begin wrestling. Since his youngest son Tomás finished his education first, he became known as "Villano IV", while the second youngest son became "Villano V". Díaz was a family man and never recovered emotionally after his wife died in 1986, followed by the premature death of José Alfredo in 1989 and the death of his second son José de Jesús in 2001.

=== Villanos family tree ===
Ray Mendoza (1929–2003)	Lupita Mendoza (d. 1986)
Villano II (1949–1989)	Villano I (1950–2001)	Villano III (1952–2018)	La Infernal	Villano V (1962–2024)	Graciela Guajardo (d. 2024)	Villano IV (b. 1965)
Villano III Jr. (b. 1998)	El Hijo del Villano III (b. 1999)	Villano V Jr. (b. 1992)	Rokambole Jr. (b. 1994)

== Death and remembrance ==
On April 15, 2003, Díaz was taken to the Hospital General de Naucalpan suffering from kidney failure and later suffered an arrhythmia in his right lung. Díaz died the night between April 16 and April 17, the official date of death being listed as April 16. His funeral was held two days later and was attended by over 100 people, longtime friends and luchadors who grew up admiring Ray Mendoza's in-ring exploits paid their last respect. Other than his family, the funeral was attended by wrestlers such as La Infernal (Villano III's wife), El Canek, Super Astro, Mano Negrao, Fuerza Guerrera, Pierroth Jr., Olímpico, Shocker, Karloff Lagarde, and his nephew Karloff Lagarde Jr., as well as Ringo Mendoza. During the funeral, some gave Ringo Mendoza their condolences on the death of "his father", not realizing that there was no actual family relationship between the two. In 2010, CMLL honored Ray Mendoza's memory at their annual Homenaje a Dos Leyendas ("Homage to two legends") show on March 19, 2010. During the show, Mendoza's three surviving sons, Villano III, Ray Mendoza Jr. and Villano IV were present for a ceremony honoring Ray Mendoza.

== Championships and accomplishments ==
- Empresa Mexicana de Lucha Libre
  - EMLL Arena México Tag Team Championship (2 times) – with Espectro I (1) and El Santo (1)
  - Mexican National Light Heavyweight Championship (1 time)
  - NWA World Light Heavyweight Championship (6 times)
  - NWA World Middleweight Championship (1 time)
  - Homenaje a Dos Leyendas honoree (2010)
- NWA Hollywood Wrestling
  - NWA Americas Tag Team Championship (4 times) – with Mil Máscaras (1), Raul Mata (1) and Raul Reyes (2)
  - NWA United National Championship (1 time)
- Universal Wrestling Association
  - UWA World Light Heavyweight Championship (3 times)
- Wrestling Observer Newsletter

- Wrestling Observer Newsletter Hall of Fame (Class of 1996)

== Luchas de Apuestas record ==
Winner (wager)	Loser (wager)	Location	Event	Date	Notes
Al Velasco (mask)	Gigantua (mask)	N/A	Live event	1954	
Ray Mendoza (hair)	Sunny War Cloud (hair)	N/A	Live event	N/A	
Ray Mendoza (hair)	El Audaz (hair)	N/A	Live event	N/A	
Ray Mendoza (hair)	Karloff Lagarde (hair)	Mexico City	Live event	1965	
René Guajardo (hair)	Ray Mendoza (hair)	Mexico City	Live event	August 1965	
Ray Mendoza (hair)	El Nazi (hair)	Mexico City	Live event	February 4, 1966	
Black Shadow and Ray Mendoza (hair)	Los Hippies (hair) (Renato Torres and El Vikingo)	Mexico City	13. Aniversario de Arena México	April 18, 1968	
El Solitario (mask)	Ray Mendoza (hair)	Mexico City	Live event	December 13, 1968	
Ray Mendoza and Dory Dixon (hair)	René Guajardo and Shibata (hair)	Mexico City	Live event	October 6, 1971	
Ángel Blanco (hair)	Ray Mendoza (hair)	Mexico City	Live event	November 10, 1972	
Ray Mendoza and Ringo Mendoza (hair)	Ángel Blanco and Kim Chul Won (hair)	Mexico City	EMLL 40th Anniversary Show	September 21, 1973	
Perro Aguayo (hair)	Ray Mendoza (hair)	Mexico City	19. Aniversario de Arena México	May 24, 1975	
Ray Mendoza (hair)	Ángel Blanco (hair)	Mexico City	Live event	July 6, 1975	
Ray Mendoza (hair)	César Valentino (hair)	Mexico City	Live event	June 26, 1977	
