= Alvarado wrestling family =

Mexican professional wrestling family

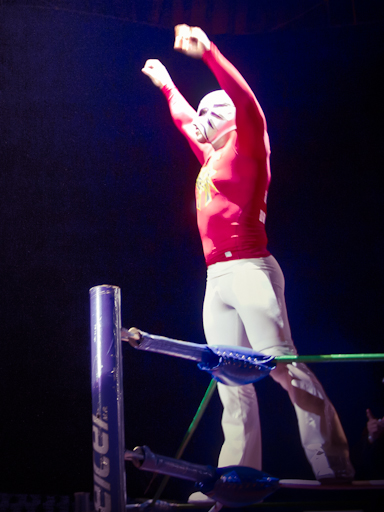
Third generation Alvarado, La Máscara.

The Alvarado wrestling family, also referred to as La Dinastia Alvarado ('The Alvarado Dynasty') in Spanish, is a Mexico City based family of professional wrestlers. The family works primarily in Mexico but have made appearances in the United States, Canada, Europe, and Japan over the years. The Patriarch of the family was Juan Alvarado Ibarra, who wrestled under the ring name Shadito Cruz, followed by his six sons who all used ring name variations of "Brazo" and included wrestlers Brazo de Oro (Spanish for Golden Arm), El Brazo (The Arm), Brazo de Plata (Silver Arm), Brazo Cibernético (Cybernetic Arm), Brazo de Platino (Platinum Arm) and Super Brazo (Super Arm). A third-generation of Alvardos made their debut around the turn of the millennium, originally all working under "Brazo" related ring names but later most changed their names to create an identity for themselves. Due to the traditions and secrecy of Mexican wrestling some wrestlers who use the "Brazo" ring name are not blood relatives of the Alvarado family and others is unconfirmed if they are truly part of the Alvarado family or not. Due to the number of wrestlers using ring names with the word "Brazo" in it the Alvarado family is at times also referred to as "the Brazo Family", while Los Brazo refers specifically to the trio of Brazo de Oro, Brazo de Plata and El Brazo.

All family members who currently are or previously have been wrestling under a "Brazo" name have begun their careers as enmascarados, or masked wrestlers. All their masks had or have the same basic mask design with the depiction of a person doing a double bicep flex pose. All six sons of Shadito Cruz have lost their masks as results of losing Luchas de Apuestas or "bet matches", while none of the third-generation Brazos (except La Máscara and Goya Kong) lost their masks in the same manner. Most of the third-generation Alvarado children began their careers using Brazo names but were later either encouraged or forced to change their names to create an identity of their own instead.

== Three generations ==
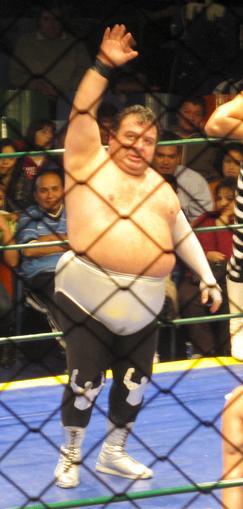
Second generation Alvarado, José Alvarado Nieves

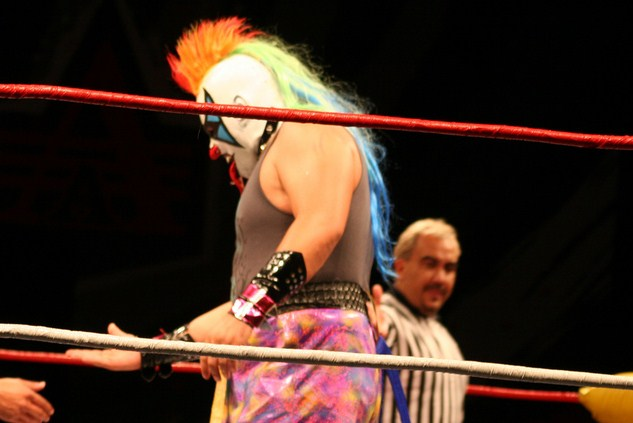
Third generation Alvarado, Psycho Clown

First generation

- Juan Alvarado Ibarra (January 7, 1915 – February 3, 2003) – Wrestled under the ring name Shadito Cruz.

Second generation

- Jesús Alvarado Nieves (October 7, 1959 – April 28, 2017) – Wrestled under the ring name Brazo de Oro.
- Juan Alvarado Nieves (July 30, 1961 – October 15, 2013) – Wrestled under the ring name El Brazo, also known as "Brazo Negro", "Brazo Hermoso", "La Braza" and a number of other ring names.
- José Luis Alvarado Nieves (March 19, 1963 – July 26, 2021) – Wrestled under the ring name Brazo de Plata, also known as "Super Porky".
- José Aarón Alvarado Nieves (May 9, 1966 – October 27, 1999) – Wrestled under the ring name Brazo Cibernético, also known as Brazo del Futur, Brazo de Bronce, Robin Hood and a number of other ring names.
- Daniel Alvarado Nieves (March 3, 1973) – Wrestles under the ring name Brazo de Platino, also worked as Shadito Cruz, Jr.
- Martín Antonio Alvarado Nieves (March 7, 1968) – Wrestles under the ring name Super Brazo.
- Guadalupe Alvarado - non-wrestling daughter of Cruz.

Third generation

- Jose Cristian Alvarado Ruiz (November 8, 1980) – Wrestles under the ring name Máximo, originally wrestled as El Brazo, Jr. but is the son of José Alvarado, not Juan Alvarado.
- Felipe de Jesús Alvarado Mendoza (January 8, 1982) – Wrestles under the ring name La Máscara, originally wrestled as Brazo de Oro, Jr. Son of Jesús Alvarado Nieves. Real name not revealed.
- Brazo Cibernético II (March 17, 1985) – Originally wrestled as Brazo Cibernético, Jr. Son of José Aarón Alvarado. Real name not revealed.
- Psycho Clown (December 16, 1985) – Originally wrestled as Brazo de Plata, Jr. Son of José Alvarado, real name not revealed.
- Gloria Alvarado Nava (May 4, 1987) – Wrestles under the ring name Goya Kong. Daughter of José Alvarado.
- Nicole Alvarado Nava (October 3, 1988) – Wrestles under the ring name Muñeca de Plata. Daughter of José Alvarado.
- Robin Ivan Alvarado Dominguez (November 9, 1990) – Wrestles under the ring name Robin, after his father José Aarón Alvarado's ring name Robin Hood.
- Hijo de Brazo de Plata (date of birth not known) – Son of José Alvarado, was the second son (and third wrestler) to use the ring name Brazo de Plata, Jr. before changing his ring name.
- Super Brazo, Jr. (date of birth not known) – Son of Martín Antonio Alvarado. Real name not revealed.
- El Hijo del Brazo (date of birth not known) – Son of Juan Alvarado Nieves. Real name not revealed.
- Brazo Celestial (date of birth not known) – Third generation Alvarado, presumed to be the son of Martín Antonio Alvarado. Real name not revealed.
- Arquero (date of birth not known) – Third generation Alvarado, son of José Aarón Alvarado. Real name not revealed.
- Alex Alvarado (November 1st, 1998) – Third generation Alvarado, Son of Brazo de Plata Sr. 3x College Division 1 champion
- Príncipe Kronos - claimed to be a member by the rest of the family, not verified who he is the son of.
- Mosquetero Del Diablo – son of Guadalupe Alvarado & La Alimaña. Might have once gone by Alimaña Jr. Real name not revealed.

Fourth generation

- La Parka III (June 14, 1999) – Originally wrestled as Brazo de Oro, Jr. (II). Nephew of Psycho Clown, presumed grandson of Jesús Alvarado, real name not revealed.
- Jose Giovanni Alvarado Casas & Luis Jose Alvarado Casas - sons of Psycho Clown.
- Goya Kong's child.

Related through marriage

- Sandra González Calderón – Ex-wife of Jesús Alvarado, not the mother of La Máscara, wrestles as Lady Apache.
- La Alimaña – Married to Guadalupe Alvarado, one of the second-generation Alvarado sisters.
- India Sioux – Married to Jose Cristian Alvarado. The couple have at least one son.
- Zaraida Casas - Married to Psycho Clown.
- Sergio Marca - Married to Gloria Alvarado, wrestles as Carta Brava Jr.
- Natalia Durán Bazadoni - Married to La Parka III, wrestles as La Hiedra.

Fictional or unconfirmed family members

A number of wrestlers have been presented as part of the Alvarado family by using the "Brazo" ring name, but later revealed to be fictional and some, where the family relationship has not been confirmed

- Andros de Plata – originally presented as the son of José Alvarado, and the second wrestler to use the ring name Brazo de Plata, Jr. before changing his ring name. Was later revealed as a "conman" by José, who had agreed to pay for the name and failed to do so
- Brazo de Platino, Jr. – Claims to be third-generation Alvarado. Uses the same ring name Jose Cristian Alvarado used early in his career
- El Brazo, Jr. - may have gained permission from Juan Alvarado Nieves
- Super Brazo II - introduced by Martín Antonio Alvarado as his protégé & successor, due to a dispute with his son Super Brazo Jr.
- Hijo de Super Brazo - debuted soon after Super Brazo II, validity of relationship unconfirmed
- Golden Magic – Originally wrestled as Brazo Metalico, now as Octagon Jr.

== Family tree ==
† = deceased

Shadito Cruz †	Ana Nieves †
Lady Apache	Brazo de Oro †	El Brazo †	Brazo de Plata †	Brazo Cibernético †	Brazo de Platino	Super Brazo	Guadalupe Alvarado	La Alimaña
Aramís	La Máscara	El Hijo del Brazo	Máximo	Robin	El Hijo del Brazo de Platino	Super Brazo Jr.	Mosquetero Del Diablo
unknown sibling	Zaraida Casas	Psycho Clown	India Sioux	Brazo Cibernético II	Brazo Celestial
Carta Brava Jr.	Goya Kong	Hijo de Brazo de Plata	Arquero
La Parka (III)
Muñeca de Plata

== Homenaje a Shadito Cruz ==
In early 2013 it was announced that the Alvarado family, in corporation with the National Chamber of Women in Mexico (Canadem) and Producciones Vanguardistas, would hold a show that would feature no less than 19 wrestlers from the Alvarado family and serve as a fundraiser for Canadem and pay homage to the Alvardo patriarch Shadito Cruz and matriarch Ana Nieves. The Director of Sports Activities and Social Development, Lorena Cid and promoter Ismael Gonzalez Arellano cited the Alvarado family as an example of how families should stay together despite adversity. The show took place on Sunday, February 17, 2013, in Arena Neza, in Naucalpan, State of Mexico. In the main event of the show the team of Máximo and La Máscara defeated Los Capos, Jr. (Cien Caras, Jr. and Hijo del Máscara Año 2000) to win the 'Copa Shadito Cruz trophy. During the show it was confirmed that Brazo Celestial was indeed a member of the Alvarado Family, and not just someone who had been allowed to use the name. Neither El Brazo nor Psycho Clown actually wrestled on the show since they were under contract with AAA they were not allowed to compete on a show involving CMLL wrestlers. El Brazo made an appearance before the second match along with his brothers Brazo de Oro and Brazo de Plata, celebrating the original Los Brazos. Psycho Clown made an appearance during the main event to help his cousins win the match. For the show Gran Markus, Jr. came out of retirement to compete in the second match, he wrestled wearing the mask the officially lost on 2002 for this one-time appearance.

No.	Results	Stipulations
1	Goya Kong, Muñeca de Plata, and Dark Lady defeated Marcela, Sahori, and Cassandra	Two out of three falls six-man tag team match
2	Brazo de Oro, Brazo de Plata, El Canek and El Solar defeated Gran Markus, Jr., Negro Navarro, Sangre Chicana and Villano III	Two out of three falls eight-man tag team match for La Copa Toreo de Cuatro Caminos
3	Brazo Celestial defeated Robin and others	Multi-Man La Copa Junior Torneo cibernetico elimination match
4	Súper Brazo and Brazo de Platino defeated El Hijo de Fishman and El Hijo de Canek	Tag team match, La Copa Shadito Cruz Quarter-final match
5	Máximo and La Máscara defeated Sepultura, Jr. and Valiente	Tag team match, La Copa Shadito Cruz semi-final match
6	Máximo and La Máscara defeated Súper Brazo and Brazo de Platino	Tag team match, La Copa Shadito Cruz semi-final match
7	Máximo and La Máscara defeated Los Capos, Jr. (Cien Caras, Jr. and Hijo del Máscara Año 2000)	Tag team match, La Copa Shadito Cruz semi-final match
