= Goya Kong =

Mexican luchadora

Personal information
- Born: Gloria Alvarado Nava; May 4, 1987 (age 39)
- Spouse: Carta Brava Jr. (m. 2015)
- Children: 1
- Parent: Brazo de Plata (father)
- Relatives: Shadito Cruz (grandfather); Psycho Clown (brother); Máximo (brother); La Parka III (nephew)
- Family: Alvarado wrestling family
- Website: Facebook page

Professional wrestling career
- Ring name(s): Goya; Goya Kong
- Billed height: 1.70 m (5 ft 7 in)
- Billed weight: 85 kg (187 lb)
- Trained by: Hijo del Gladiador
- Debut: December 8, 2007

Gloria Alvarado Nava (born May 4, 1987) is a Mexican professional wrestler best known by the ring name Goya Kong for her time working for Lucha Libre AAA Worldwide (AAA) and Consejo Mundial de Lucha Libre (CMLL). She is the third-generation professional wrestler, part of the Alvarado wrestling family as she is the granddaughter of Shadito Cruz and the daughter of José Alvarado Nieves, who worked under the ring name Brazo de Plata. She has several brothers and a sister who are also active wrestlers along with a number of uncles and cousins.

== Personal life ==
Gloria Alvarado Nava is a member of the extensive Alvarado family who have been associated with Mexican professional wrestling since her grandfather, Juan Alvarado Ibarra better known as Shadito Cruz began his wrestling career in 1931. Six of Alvarado's sons became professional wrestlers as well, including Gloria Alvarado's father José Alvarado Nieves who is best known as Brazo de Plata ("Silver Arm") and her uncles Jesús (Brazo de Oro), Juan (El Brazo), José Aarón (Brazo Cibernético), Daniel (Brazo de Platino) and Martín Antonio (Super Brazo). A third-generation of Alvarado wrestlers began working from around 2000 going forward, including Gloria's brothers Jose Cristian Alvarado Ruiz (Máximo) and others whose real name has not been made public as they work under masks, but are known by ring names such as Psycho Clown as well as her sister who works under the ring name Danah / Muñeca de Plata. Her extended family includes professional wrestlers La Mascara, El Brazo Jr. and Super Brazo Jr. There are a number of "storyline" members of the "Brazo" family, wrestlers who either paid for or was given the Junior names of the various second-generation wrestlers to use the Brazo Name, although some of those have later changed their ring names, such as Golden Magic who originally wrestled as Brazo Metallico. In 2012, Goya Kong participated in the French film "Queens of ring" (Les Reines du ring). The film was released on July 3, 2013, with WWE Superstars Cm Punk, The Miz, and former WWE Diva Eve Torres. Goya Kong appears with her mask.

== The Alvarado family tree ==
† = deceased

Shadito Cruz † | Ana Nieves †
Lady Apache | Brazo de Oro † | El Brazo † | Brazo de Plata † | Brazo Cibernético † | Brazo de Platino | Super Brazo | La Alimaña
Aramís | La Máscara | El Brazo Jr. | Máximo | Robin | Super Brazo Jr.
Psycho Clown | India Sioux | Brazo Cibernético II
Carta Brava Jr. | Goya Kong
Danah

== Professional wrestling career ==
Gloria Alvarado Nava made her professional wrestling debut in late 2007, wearing a mask, working as a tecnica (someone who plays a "good guy" character) under the ring name Goya. She worked a couple of matches for Lucha Libre AAA World Wide (AAA), the same promotion her father worked for at the time.

=== Consejo Mundial de Lucha Libre (2010–2015) ===
Brazo de Plata returned to CMLL in 2010 after having worked for other promotions for a number of years. In the months following his return Alvarado publicly talked about Goya, now renamed Goya Kong being his daughter, seeking opportunities for her to further her career. Goya Kong made her CMLL debut on June 13, 2010, teaming with CMLL tecnicas Lady Apache and Marcela as the trio defeated La Amapola, La Comandante and Mima Shimoda Over the next year or so Alvarado received further training from CMLL head trainer Hijo del Gladiador while also gaining in-ring experience. Through her CMLL contacts Goya Kong also worked for southern California based Lucha POP in late 2011. In the summer of 2012 Goya Kong began to develop a rivalry with the masked Ruda La Seductora, a storyline many speculated may lead to a Luchas de Apuestas ("Bet Match") between the two where both would risk their masks on the outcome of the match. When the match was finally announced it did not just include the two women risking their masks, but an additional eight women who would all risk their hair on the outcome of the annual Infierno en el Ring steel cage match. Besides Goya Kong and La Seductora the match included La Amapola, Dalys la Caribeña, Dark Angel, Estrellita, Lady Apache, Marcela, Princesa Blanca and Tiffany. The match came down to Goya Kong and Princesa Blanca as everyone else had escaped the cage. In the end Princesa Blanca pinned Goya Kong, forcing her to unmask in the middle of the ring. Following the loss Goya Kong stated that while it was a set-back to her young career the mask loss would not stop her. On April 7, 2013, Goya Kong outlasted Marcela, Estrellita, Dalys La Caribeña, Silueta, La Amapola, Princesa Sugey, Princesa Blanca, Zeuxis, Tiffany to win the Trofeo Arena Coliseo 70 Aniversario, commemorating the 70th anniversary of Arena Coliseo.

=== Lucha Libre AAA World Wide (2015–2019) ===
On June 28, 2015, Kong made a surprise jump to AAA, being introduced by her brother Psycho Clown.

== Championships and accomplishments ==
- Consejo Mundial de Lucha Libre

- Trofeo Arena Coliseo 70 Aniversario

== Luchas de Apuestas record ==
| Winner (wager) | Loser (wager) | Location | Event | Date | Notes |
|---|---|---|---|---|---|
| Princesa Blanca (hair) | Goya Kong (mask) | Mexico City | Infierno en el Ring | June 29, 2012 | (Note: Steel cage match that also included Dalys la Caribeña, La Seductora, Marcela, Tiffany, Lady Apache, Dark Angel, Estrellita and La Amapola.) |
