= Brazo de Plata =

Mexican professional wrestler (1963–2021)

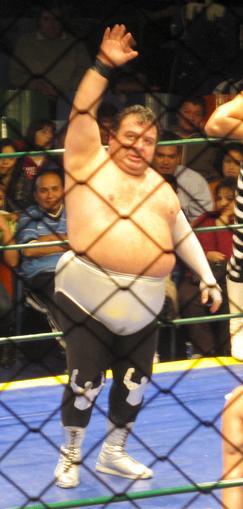
- Brazo de Plata in 2009

Personal information
- Born: José Luis Alvarado Nieves; March 19, 1963 Mexico City, Mexico
- Died: July 26, 2021 (aged 58) Mexico City, Mexico
- Children: 5, including Psycho Clown, Máximo & Goya Kong

Professional wrestling career
- Ring names: Brazo de Plata; Elvis Porky; Super Porky
- Billed height: 1.70 m (5 ft 7 in)
- Billed weight: 135 kg (298 lb; 21.3 st)
- Trained by: Shadito Cruz; Felipe Ham Lee Tatsumi Fujinami
- Debut: January 21, 1977
- Retired: 2016

José Luis Alvarado Nieves (March 19, 1963 – July 26, 2021) was a Mexican professional wrestler, best known under the ring name Brazo de Plata, a name he had used since his debut in 1977. He is also well known for his appearances in WWE as Super Porky. Alvarado was a member of the Alvarado wrestling family which includes his father Shadito Cruz, five brothers who used the "Brazo" name at some point and several third-generation wrestlers who have appeared over the last couple of years.

== Professional wrestling career ==
=== Early career (1977–1988) ===
Alvarado made his debut as "Brazo De Plata" (Spanish for "Silver arm"), an Enmascarado (masked wrestler) who worked mainly in tag team matches with his brother who worked as Brazo de Oro ("Gold arm") and in trios action with another brother known simply as El Brazo ("the arm"). Los Brazos, as they were billed, wrestled all over Mexico and made appearances for the Los Angeles based NWA Hollywood Wrestling. While working for NWA Hollywood Wrestling, Plata and Oro won the NWA Americas Tag Team Championship from Chino Chou and the Kiss on November 7, 1981. The brothers were also last holders of the Los Angeles version of the NWA World Tag Team Championship in 1982.

=== Losing the masks (1988–1990) ===
Over the years Brazo de Plata and his brothers competed in a large number of Luchas de Apuestas ("Bet fights") where they put their masks or hair on the line against their opponents. Los Brazos' most famous Luchas de Apuestas occurred on October 21, 1988, when Brazo de Plata, Brazo de Oro, and El Brazo all placed their masks on the line in a match against another well known Lucha libre family, Los Villanos, in this case Villano I, Villano IV and Villano V. The match was the culmination of a long feud (storyline) between the two families and saw all six wrestlers bleed profusely during the bout. In the end Los Villanos won the match, forcing all three Brazos to unmask and reveal their real names as is tradition in these types of matches. Despite losing their masks Los Brazos remained successful in the ring, winning various tag team and trios titles, such as the UWA World Tag Team Championship, UWA World Trios Championship, WWA World Tag Team Championship and the WWA World Trios Championship.

=== Consejo Mundial de Lucha Libre (1985–2005) ===
Alvarado debuted for Consejo Mundial de Lucha Libre (CMLL) in 1985. By the 1990s Los Brazos worked primarily for CMLL, where Plato, Oro and El Brazo won the CMLL World Trios Championship from Los Infernales (Pirata Morgan, Satánico and MS-1) on April 6, 1993. Los Brazos lost the titles to Dr. Wagner Jr., Gran Markus Jr. and El Hijo del Gladiador. 1993 also saw Brazo de Plata get the biggest singles win of his career as he defeated Black Magic for the CMLL World Heavyweight Championship, a title he would hold over a year.

As the years wore on and Brazo de Plata's waistline expanded he found himself working a more comedic style, often seen as a specialty act. During this time period he was nicknamed "Super Porky" in reference to his weight gain, a nickname Brazo de Plata seemed to embrace.

=== World Wrestling Entertainment (2005–2006) ===
Plata was hired by World Wrestling Entertainment (WWE) in 2005 as part of the SmackDown! brand's short-lived Juniors Division. Plata was billed as "Super Porky" and paired up with the minis of the Juniors division. Brazo de Plata's appearances played for comedy and no real in-ring appearances came of it before the entire Juniors division concept was ended in March 2006 and all the workers in the division were released.

=== Lucha Libre AAA Worldwide (2006–2009) ===
Alvarado in CMLL as "Rotoporky" Brazo de Plata

After having worked for many years for CMLL Brazo de Plata jumped to its rival promotion Lucha Libre AAA Worldwide (AAA) making one of his first appearances at AAA's annual Verano de Escandalo show. Almost from the start Brazo de Plata began working a storyline with "Los Guapos VIP" a stable of wrestlers obsessed with their good looks, the polar opposite of the fun loving, overweight Brazo de Plata. At Verano de Escándalo, Brazo de Plata, Intocable, El Oriental and El Zorro lost to the team of Alan Stone, Hator, Scorpio Jr., and Zumbido. At the following featured show, Guerrera de Titanes 2006, Brazo de Plata had his hair shaved off as he lost a Dog collar chain match to Alan Stone and Scorpio Jr. The storyline with Los Guapos VIP continued throughout 2007 and into 2008 where it saw a surprising turn. Brazo de Plata's brother El Brazo jumped to AAA and attacked his own brother, taking the (storyline) control of the Los Guapos VIP group. The storyline fight of the two brothers came to a crescendo at Guerrera de Titanes 2008, where they faced off in a steel cage match where the loser would have his hair shaved off. El Brazo lost and had his hair shaved to put at least a temporary end to the storyline.

He left AAA in March 2009, with his last appearance being March 15 at the Plaza Nuevo Progreso in Guadalajara, Jalisco, losing to La Parka in a semi-final of the Reyes de Reyes Tournament, also featuring Escoria and Kenzo Suzuki.

=== Later career (2009–2016) ===
After leaving AAA, Plata began working independent dates throughout the country as well as wrestling regularly for the International Wrestling Revolution Group (IWRG), Perros del Mal Producciones (PdM), and his former home promotion CMLL. He wrestled his last match in 2016.

== Death ==
On July 26, 2021, Super Porky died at the age of 58; his cause of death was a heart attack. According to his son, wrestler Psycho Clown, his father's girlfriend called him to tell him he was not breathing. Psycho Clown arrived at his father's house and performed CPR, to no success.

== Alvarado family ==
The Alvarado wrestling family spans three generations starting with Shadito Cruz followed by his 6 sons and a third-generation who have begun wrestling in recent years. José Alvarado has 5 children who have all followed in his footsteps, his sons José (working as Máximo), Psycho Clown and Magia Jr. and his two daughters Danah and Gloria Alvarado Nava, who wrestles as Goya Kong.

† = deceased

Shadito Cruz †	Ana Nieves †
Lady Apache	Brazo de Oro †	El Brazo †	Brazo de Plata †	Brazo Cibernético †	Brazo de Platino	Super Brazo	La Alimaña
Aramís	La Máscara	El Brazo Jr.	Máximo	Robin	Super Brazo Jr.
Psycho Clown	India Sioux	Brazo Cibernético II
Carta Brava Jr.	Goya Kong
Danah

== Championships and accomplishments ==
- Consejo Mundial de Lucha Libre
  - CMLL World Heavyweight Championship (1 time)
  - CMLL World Trios Championship (1 time) – with Brazo de Oro and El Brazo
  - Mexican National Tag Team Championship (1 time) – with Brazo de Oro
  - Mexican National Trios Championship (3 times) – with Brazo de Oro and El Brazo (2) and El Brazo and Super Elektra (1)
- Federación Internacional de Lucha Libre
  - FILL Trios Championship (1 time) – with Brazo de Oro and El Brazo
- NWA Hollywood Wrestling
  - NWA Americas Tag Team Championship (1 time) – with Brazo de Oro
  - NWA World Tag Team Championship (Los Angeles version) (1 time) – with Brazo de Oro
- Pro Wrestling Illustrated
  - PWI ranked him #229 of the 500 best singles wrestlers of the PWI 500 in 2006
- Universal Wrestling Association
  - UWA World Tag Team Championship (1 time) – with Brazo de Oro
  - UWA World Trios Championship (3 times) – with Brazo de Oro and El Brazo
- World Wrestling Association
  - WWA World Tag Team Championship (1 time) – with Brazo de Oro
  - WWA World Trios Championship (1 time)
- Wrestling Observer Newsletter
  - Wrestling Observer Newsletter Hall of Fame (Class of 2021) as part of Los Brazos
- Other titles
  - Distrito Federal Trios Championship (1 time) – with Brazo de Oro and El Brazo
  - Distrito Federal Tag Team Championship (1 time) – with El Brazo
  - Puebla Tag Team Championship (1 time) – with Brazo de Oro

== Luchas de Apuestas record ==
Winner (wager)	Loser (wager)	Location	Event	Date	Notes
Brazo de Plata (mask)	Tony Grimaldo (hair)	N/A	Live event	N/A	
Brazo de Plata (mask)	Anfibius (hair)	N/A	Live event	N/A	
Brazo de Plata (mask)	Astral (Note: >Not the current wrestler known as Astral) (mask)	N/A	Live event	N/A	
Los Brazos (masks) (Brazo de Oro and Brazo de Plata)	Los Migra (masks) (Migra I and Migra II)	N/A	Live event	1978	
Brazo de Plata (mask)	Lobo del Ring (mask)	N/A	Live event	December 18, 1978	
Los Brazoz (masks) (Brazo de Oro and Brazo de Plata)	Danny Grimaldo and Tauro (hair)	Naucalpan, Mexico State	Live event	February 21, 1979	
Los Brazos (mask) (Brazo de Oro and Brazo de Plata)	Los Wrestling (masks) (Wrestling I and Wrestling II)	Mexico City	Live event	July 12, 1981	
Los Brazoz (masks) (Brazo de Oro and Brazo de Plata)	Enfermero II and Flama Azul (masks)	Mexico City	Live event	August 22, 1982	(Note: This was the finals of a 24-man "Loser advances" tournament.)
Los Brazoz (masks) (El Brazo and Brazo de Plata)	Los Corsarios (masks) (Corsario I and Corsario II)	Mexico City	UWA live event	August 3, 1985	
Los Villanos (masks) (Villano I, Villano IV and Villano V)	Los Brazos (masks) (Brazo de Oro, Brazo de Plata and El Brazo)	Monterrey, Nuevo León	Live event	October 21, 1988	
Emilio Charles Jr. (hair)	Brazo de Plata (hair)	Guadalajara, Jalisco	Live event	N/A	
Los Brazoz (hair) (El Brazo and Brazo de Plata)	El Verdugo and Hombre Bala (hair)	Mexico City	Live event	November 17, 1989	
Ringo Mendoza (hair)	Brazo de Plata (hair)	N/A	Live event	N/A	
Salomon Grundy (hair)	Brazo de Plata (hair)	N/A	Live event	N/A	
Brazo de Plata (hair)	Asesino Negro (hair)	Guadalajara, Jalisco	Live event	1990	
Brazo de Plata (hair)	Aaron Grundy (hair)	Mexico City	Live event	December 15, 1992	
Brazo de Plata (hair)	Rambo (hair)	Mexico City	Live event	December 1996	
Brazo de Plata (hair)	Mano Negra (hair)	Mexico City	Live event	April 15, 1997	
Brazo de Plata (hair)	Bestia Negra I (hair)	Mexico City	Live event	April 24, 1998	
Brazo de Plata (hair)	Gran Markus Jr. (hair)	Mexico City	Live event	May 29, 1998	
Máscara Año 2000 (mask)	Brazo de Plata (hair)	Mexico City	Live event	August 7, 1998	
Brazo de Plata (hair)	Bestia Negra III (hair)	Mexico City	Live event	December 19, 1998	
Brazo de Plata (hair)	Sensei Akira (mask)	Nuevo Laredo, Tamaulipas	Live event	March 29, 1999	
Brazo de Plata (hair)	Apolo Dantés (hair)	Mexico City	Live event	November 26, 1999	(Note: This was a triangle match that also included Pierroth Jr.)
Pierroth Jr. (hair)	Brazo de Plata (hair)	Mexico City	Live event	December 3, 1999	
Brazo de Plata (hair)	Bestia Negra III (hair)	Cuernavaca, Morelos	Live event	May 4, 2000	(Note: Los Brazos (Brazo de Oro, Brazo de Plata, Brazo de Oro Jr.) defeated Bestias Negras (I, II and III) III was pinned so he lost his hair.)
El Felino (mask)	Brazo de Plata (hair)	Tijuana, Baja California	Live event	June 23, 2000	(Note: Relevos suicidas match; El Hijo del Santo and Pierroth Jr. defeated El Felino and Brazo de Plata.)
Tarzan Boy (hair)	Brazo de Plata (hair)	Mexico City	CMLL Sin Piedad 2001	December 14, 2001	
Villano III (hair)	Brazo de Plata (hair)	Nezahualcoyotl, Mexico State	Live event	September 16, 2002	
Pierroth Jr. (hair)	Brazo de Plata (hair)	Cuernavaca, Morelos	Live event	July 31, 2003	
Brazo de Plata (hair)	Asesino Negro (hair)	Guadalajara, Jalisco	Live event	June 6, 2004	
Halloween (hair)	Brazo de Plata (hair)	Tijuana, Baja California	Live event	June 25, 2004	
Brazo de Plata (hair)	Asesino Negro (hair)	Guadalajara, Jalisco	Live event	January 17, 2006	
Scorpio Jr. (hair)	Brazo de Plata (hair)	Ciudad Madero	Guerra de Tianes	December 8, 2006	(Note: This was a four-way match that also included Alan Stone and El Intocable)
Brazo de Plata (hair)	Asesino Negro (hair)	Guadalajara, Jalisco	Live event	May 26, 2010	
La Fuerza TRT (hair) (El Texano Jr. and El Terrible)	La Dinastia Alvarado (hair) (Brazo de Plata and Máximo)	Mexico City	Homenaje a Dos Leyendas	March 18, 2011	
Rey Escorpión (hair)	Brazo de Plata (hair)	Mexico City	Super Viernes	August 18, 2013	

== Mixed martial arts record ==
Professional record breakdown
1 match	0 wins	1 loss
By knockout	0	0
By submission	0	1
By decision	0	0

Res.	Record	Opponent	Method	Event	Date	Round	Time	Location	Notes
Loss	0–1	Takumi Yano	Submission (heel hook)	Deep - 9th Impact	May 5, 2003	2	0:24	Tokyo, Japan	
