= Brazo de Platino =

Mexican professional wrestler

Personal information
- Born: Daniel Alvarado Nieves; March 7, 1973 (age 53) Mexico City, Mexico

Professional wrestling career
- Ring name(s): Brazo de Platino; Shadito Cruz, Jr. Super Makita
- Billed height: 1.70 m (5 ft 7 in)
- Billed weight: 108 kg (238 lb)
- Trained by: Shadito Cruz; Brazo de Oro
- Debut: 1986

Daniel Alvarado Nieves (born March 7, 1973) is a Mexican professional wrestler, better known by the ring name Brazo de Platino ("Platinum Arm"). He is a part of the extensive Alvarado wrestling family that was founded by his father Shadito Cruz and includes Alvarado's five older brothers as well as a large number of third-generation wrestlers. Most of the wrestlers in the Alvarado family is using or has used a ring name with the word "Brazo" ("Arm") in it at some point in their career. Alvarado has worked for a number of Mexican promotion, but is currently working on the Mexican Independent circuit and not permanently for one specific promotion.

== Professional wrestling career ==
Daniel Alvarado Nieves was the youngest of six sons of Shadito Cruz and the last one to make his debut in 1986 after training under both his father and his brother Jesús Alvarado Nieves, better known as Brazo de Oro. Initially he wrestled as Shadito Cruz Jr. and is the only Alvarado sibling to officially be billed as such.

=== Brazo de Platino ===
After a few years as a professional wrestler Daniel Alvarado adopted a new ring name and character, Brazo de Platino ("Platinum Arm"), a name inspired by the ring name of his older brothers Brazo de Oro, Brazo de Plata, and El Brazo. The last two Alvarado siblings also adopted "Brazo" names and became Súper Brazo and Brazo Cibernético. While his three oldest brothers had worked as "Los Brazos" and other Brazos had at times replaced one of them, Brazo de Platino, Brazo Cibernético, and Súper Brazo worked as Los Nuevo Brazos for the Universal Wrestling Association starting in 1992. By 1994 the UWA collapsed and stopped promoting shows altogether. In the years following the collapse of the UWA Brazo de Platino became a regular on the Mexican independent circuit, especially around Mexico City, oftentimes teaming with Súper Brazo and Brazo Cibernético until the death of Brazo Cibernético in 1999. In 2000 Brazo de Platino began working regularly for Consejo Mundial de Lucha Libre (CMLL), one of Mexico's largest wrestling promotions. During his time in CMLL he became involved in a long-running storyline feud against Olímpico, a storyline that led Brazo de Platino losing his mask as he was forced to unmask after losing a Luchas de Apuestas, or bet match, on July 27, 2000, to Olímpico. The mask lost meant that all six Alvarado siblings had lost their masks in Luchas de Apuestas matches. Over the years Brazo de Platino became more of a "Special attraction" wrestler, brought in by a promoter for a few events but not working regularly, long term for any promotion. Brazo de Platino, as well as most of the other second-generation Alvarado brothers often lost their hair in Luchas de Apuestas matches, losing to wrestlers such as Black Warrior, El Dandy, Rey Bucanero, Zumbido, Alan Stone, Villano III, Villano IV, and Ray Mendoza Jr. Brazo de Platino even lost his hair to his own brother, Súper Brazo, on at least two occasions, both times as a result of the brothers losing a Relevos Suicidas where they were forced to fight each other as a result. Platino began working for Toryumon Mexico in 2010 as he participated in their annual Yamaha Cup where Brazo de Platino and Brazo de Plata lost in the first round to El Hijo del Fantasma and Angélico. He also participated in the Dragonmania V "Dragon Scramble" match but lost to Hijo del Fantasma. For later Toryumon shows Brazo de Platino worked as the enmascarado character "Super Makita", a gimmick based on the show sponsor Makita power tools. In the first appearance as Super Makita he teamed up with "Super Suzuki", another sponsored character. The following year Platino (as Platino), participated in the "Dragon Scramble" match at DragonMania VI, but lost to Hajime Ohara. On February 2, 2013, Brazo de Platino and Súper Brazo took part in another chapter in the decade long feud between the Alvarado brothers and Los Villanos as the two lost a Luchas de Apuestas to Villano III and Villano IV and was once again shaved bald. On February 17, 2013, Súper Brazo and the rest of the Alvarado family held a special show, Homenaje a Shadito Cruz ("Homage to Shadito Cruz") where he teamed up with Súper Brazo and competed in the La Copa Shadito Cruz tournament, defeating El Hijo de Fishman and El Hijo de Canek before losing to their nephews Máximo and La Máscara in the semi-finals of the tournament.

== The Alvarado family ==
The Alvarado wrestling family spans three generations starting with Shadito Cruz followed by his 6 sons and a third-generation of wrestlers that started working in the late 1990s. At least two different wrestlers have worked under the ring name "Brazo de Platino Jr." The first Brazo de Platino Jr. was Jose Cristian Alvarado Ruiz, the son of José Luis Alvarado (Brazo de Plata), who used the name since someone else was already wrestling as "Brazo de Plata Jr. He used the name until changing his ring character in 2004 to Maximo. In 2010 another wrestler began working as Brazo de Platino Jr. but it was never confirmed if he truly was the son of Alvarado, a member of the Alvarado family or someone who was allowed to use the name and thus only had a storyline, or fictional, connection to the family.

On May 19, 2017 footage of Daniel Alvarado and other members of the Alvarado family, notably his nephews José (Máximo Sexy), Felipe Alvarado (La Máscara), Psycho Clown and Robin, destroying the Ford Mustang belonging to José Gutiérrez, better known as Último Guerrero. The vandalism was reportedly motivated by the fact that Gutiérrez had spoken out against Felipe Alvarado as a possible the head of the wrestler's union after the death of Alvarado's father. The head of the CMLL wrestlers' union had been in the Avarado family for over a decade and the Alvarado family believed it should go to someone in their family. The following day CMLL reportedly fired both Felipe and José Alvarado.

† = deceased

Shadito Cruz †	Ana Nieves †
Lady Apache	Brazo de Oro †	El Brazo †	Brazo de Plata †	Brazo Cibernético †	Brazo de Platino	Super Brazo	La Alimaña
Aramís	La Máscara	El Brazo Jr.	Máximo	Robin	Super Brazo Jr.
Psycho Clown	India Sioux	Brazo Cibernético II
Carta Brava Jr.	Goya Kong
Danah

== Luchas de Apuestas record ==
Winner (wager)	Loser (wager)	Location	Event	Date	Notes
Olímpico (mask)	Brazo de Platino (mask)	Cuernavaca, Morelos	Live event	July 27, 2000	
Zapatista (hair)	Brazo de Platino (hair)	Cuernavaca, Morelos	Live event	September 7, 2000	
Black Warrior (mask)	Brazo de Platino (hair)	San Luis Potosí, San Luis Potosí	Live event	September 30, 2000	(Note: Last two wrestlers in a steel cage match)
Olímpico (mask)	Brazo de Platino (hair)	Acapulco, Guerrero	Live event	December 26, 2000	
El Dandy (hair)	Brazo de Platino (hair)	Cuernavaca, Morelos	Live event	May 30, 2001	
Tony Rivera (hair)	Brazo de Platino (hair)	Cuernavaca, Morelos	Live event	October 18, 2001	
Rey Bucanero (hair)	Brazo de Platino (hair)	Mexico City	Live event	August 11, 2002	
Brazo de Platino (hair)	Bestia Negra I (hair)	Cuernavaca, Morelos	Live event	January 8, 2004	(Note: "Captain's Fall" trios match, Brazo de Platino (Captain), Brazo de Oro and Súper Brazo vs. Besita Negra I (Captain), Bestial and Impacto/)
Brazo de Platino (hair)	Queen (hair)	Cuernavaca, Morelos	Live event	April 15, 2004	
Zumbido and Súper Brazo (hair)	Brazo de Platino and Crazy 33 (hair)	Cuernavaca, Morelos	Live event	July 1, 2004	
Brazo de Platino (hair)	Travesti (hair)	Mexico City	Live event	2004	
Alan Stone (hair)	Brazo de Platino (hair)	Tehuacán, Puebla	Live event	July 31, 2004	(Note: a torneo cibernetico also involving Chris Stone, Impacto, Virus, Nosawa, Violencia & Zumbido)
Magnifico I (hair)	Brazo de Platino (hair)	Coacalco, Mexico State	Live event	October 17, 2004	
??? (hair)	Brazo de Platino (hair)	Toluca, Mexico State	Live event	December 18, 2004	(Note: Last two wrestlers in a steel cage match involving Villano III, Villano IV, Villano V, Brazo de Oro & Brazo de Plata)
??? (hair)	Brazo de Platino (hair)	Xalapa, Veracruz	Live event	July 14, 2005	(Note: Last two wrestlers in a steel cage match involving Rey Bucanero, Satanico, Brazo de Plata, Emilio Charles Jr. & El Terrible)
Súper Brazo (hair)	Brazo de Platino (hair)	Tampico, Tamaulipas	Live event	September 21, 2005	(Note: Lost a Relevos Suicidas match to Bronco and Bulldozer and were forced to wrestle each other.)
Villano III (hair)	Brazo de Platino (hair)	Cuautitlan, State of Mexico	Live event	May 16, 2006	(Note: Last two wrestlers in a steel cage match that also included Villano IV, Villano V, Brazo de Oro and Brazo de Plata.)
Brazo de Platino (hair)	Asesino Negro (hair)	Guadalajara, Jalisco	Live event	July 23, 2006	
Cesar Dantes (hair)	Brazo de Platino (hair)	Guadalajara, Jalisco	Live event	July 30, 2006	
Súper Brazo (hair)	Brazo de Platino (hair)	Mexico City	Live event	April 21, 2007	(Note: Lost a Relevos Suicidas match to Villano IV and Villano V, Coco Blanco and Coco Verde, Pierroth, Jr. and Emilio Charles, Jr. and were forced to wrestle each other.)
Oro Negro (mask)	Brazo de Platino (hair)	Ciudad Madero, Tamaulipas	Live event	July 16, 2008	
Hajime Ohara (hair)	Brazo de Platino (hair)	Guadalajara, Jalisco	Live event	March 1, 2009	
Virus (hair)	Brazo de Platino (hair)	Acapulco de Juárez, Guerrero	Live event	December 30, 2009	(Note: Ruleta de la Muerte match)
Apolo Estrada, Jr. (hair)	Brazo de Platino (hair)	Chilpancingo, Guerrero	Live event	November 19, 2010	(Note: Last two wrestlers in a steel cage match that also included Volador Jr., La Máscara, Psicosis, El Hijo de Aníbal, Héctor Garza, Histeria, Dragón Rojo, Jr. and Atlantis.)
Ray Mendoza, Jr. (hair)	Brazo de Platino (hair)	Nezahualcoyotl, State of Mexico	Live event	March 3, 2012	(Note: Last two wrestlers in a steel cage match also involving Villano III, Villano IV, Brazo de Oro & Brazo de Plata)
Los Villanos (Villano III (hair) and Villano IV (mask))	Brazo de Platino and Súper Brazo (hair)	Tlalnepantla, State of Mexico	Live event	February 2, 2013	
Brazo Cibernetico Jr. (mask)	Brazo de Platino (hair)	Cuauhtémoc, Mexico City	Live event	May 2, 2024	
