= El Brazo =

Mexican professional wrestler

- Alvarado wearing his "El Brazo" wrestling gear

Personal information
- Born: Juan Alvarado Nieves; July 30, 1961 Mexico City, Mexico
- Died: October 15, 2013 (aged 52) Mexico City, Mexico

Professional wrestling career
- Ring name(s): El Brazo; Brazo Negro; Brazo Hermoso; Tio Lucas; Latin Boiler; Ingordable; La Puerca; La Braza
- Billed height: 1.70 m (5 ft 7 in)
- Billed weight: 115 kg (254 lb)
- Trained by: Shadito Cruz
- Debut: August 1980

Juan Alvarado Nieves (July 30, 1961 – October 15, 2013) was a Mexican professional wrestler. He was best known under the ring name El Brazo (Spanish for "the Arm"), which he used since his debut in 1980. Alvarado was part of the Alvarado wrestling family, which includes his father Shadito Cruz, five brothers who used the "Brazo" name at some point and several third-generation wrestlers.

== Professional wrestling career ==
Alvarado made his debut as "El Brazo", an masked wrestler who worked mainly in Tag team action with his brothers who worked as Brazo de Oro ("Gold arm") and Brazo de Plata ("Silver Arm"). Los Brazos, as they were billed, wrestled all over Mexico and made appearances for the Los Angeles based "NWA Hollywood Wrestling". Over the years Brazo de Plata and his brothers competed in a large number of Luchas de Apuestas ("Bet fights") where they put their masks or hair on the line against their opponents. Los Brazos' most famous Luchas de Apuestas occurred on October 21, 1988, when Brazo de Plata, Brazo de Oro and El Brazo all placed their masks on the line in a match against another well known Lucha libre family, Los Villanos, in this case Villano I, Villano IV and Villano V. The match was the culmination of a long feud (Storyline) between the two families and saw all six wrestlers bleed profusely during the bout. In the end Los Villanos won the match forcing all three Brazos to unmask and reveal their real names as its tradition in these types of matches. Despite losing their masks Los Brazos remained successful in the ring winning various tag team and trios titles such as the UWA World Tag Team Championship, UWA World Trios Championship, WWA World Tag Team Championship and the WWA World Trios Championship By the 1990s Los Brazos worked mainly for Consejo Mundial de Lucha Libre (CMLL) where Brazo de Plata, Brazo de Oro and El Brazo won the CMLL World Trios Championship from Los Infernales (Pirata Morgan, Satánico and MS-1) on April 6, 1993. Los Brazos lost the titles to Dr. Wagner, Jr., Gran Markus, Jr. and El Hijo del Gladiador.

Los Brazos began teaming less and less with Brazo de Oro working more backstage in CMLL. El Brazo began working under various ring names such as Tio Lucas, Latin Boiler, Ingordable and La Puerca, but his expanding waist line made it hard to hide who was actually behind the various gimmicks. In 2008 El Brazo signed with Asistencia, Asesoría y Administración (AAA) and quickly inserted himself in his brother Brazo de Plata's storyline with a group known as Los Guapos VIP. Initially it looked like El Brazo was siding with his brother, only to turn on him and join Los Guapos VIP, taking the (storyline) control of the Los Guapos VIP group. The storyline fight of the two brothers came to a crescendo at Guerrera de Titanes 2008, where they faced off in a steel cage match where the loser would have his hair shaved off. El Brazo lost and had his hair shaved to put at least a temporary end to the storyline. On November 5, 2011, El Brazo debuted a new exótico persona, La Braza, and aligned himself with Cassandro and Pimpinela Escarlata in their battle with fellow exóticos Nygma, Pasión Cristal, Polvo de Estrellas and Yuriko.

== Other media ==
El Brazo has appeared in the video game Lucha Libre AAA: Héroes del Ring.

== Death ==
Alvarado died on October 15, 2013, due to complications from diabetes. Alvarado was inducted into the AAA Hall of Fame on August 17, 2014, at Triplemanía XXII.

== The Alvarado family ==
The Alvarado wrestling family spans three generations starting with Shadito Cruz followed by his 6 sons and a third-generation who have begun wrestling in recent years, which includes Juan Alvarado's son that works as "El Brazo, Jr.". All second-generation Alvarados use wrestling names with the term "Brazo" in it, El Brazo (Juan Alvarado Nieves), Brazo de Oro (Jesús Alvarado Nieves), Brazo de Plata (José Alvarado Nieves), Brazo de Platino ("Platinum Arm"; Daniel Alvarado Nieves), Super Brazo (Martin Alvarado Nieves) and Brazo Cibernetico (Cybernetic Arm; José Aarón Alvarado Nieves).

† = deceased

Shadito Cruz †	Ana Nieves †
Lady Apache	Brazo de Oro †	El Brazo †	Brazo de Plata	Brazo Cibernético †	Brazo de Platino	Super Brazo	La Alimaña
Aramís	La Máscara	El Brazo Jr.	Máximo	Robin	Super Brazo Jr.
Psycho Clown	India Sioux	Brazo Cibernético II
Carta Brava Jr.	Goya Kong
Danah

== Championships and accomplishments ==
- Asistencia, Asesoría y Administración
  - AAA Hall of Fame (Class of 2014)
- Consejo Mundial de Lucha Libre
  - CMLL World Trios Championship (1 time) – with Brazo de Oro and Brazo de Plata
  - Mexican National Trios Championship (3 times) – with Brazo de Oro and Brazo de Plata (2), Brazo de Plata & Super Elektra (1)
- Comision de Box y Lucha Distrito Federal
  - Distrito Federal Trios Championship (1 time) – with Brazo de Oro and Brazo de Plata
  - Distrito Federal Tag Team Championship (1 time) – with Brazo de Plata
- Federacion Internacional de Lucha Libre
  - FILL Trios Championship (1 time) – with Brazo de Oro and Brazo de Plata
- International Wrestling Revolution Group
  - Legado Final (2011) – with El Hijo del Brazo
- Universal Wrestling Association
  - UWA World Trios Championship (3 times) – with Brazo de Oro and Brazo de Plata
- World Wrestling Association
  - WWA World Trios Championship (1 time) – with Brazo de Oro and Brazo de Plata
- Wrestling Observer Newsletter
  - Wrestling Observer Newsletter Hall of Fame (Class of 2021) as part of Los Brazos

== Luchas de Apuestas record ==
Winner (wager)	Loser (wager)	Location	Event	Date	Notes
Chessman (hair)	El Brazo	Live event	Unknown	Unknown	
Negro Navarro (hair)	El Brazo (hair)	Neza, Mexico State	Live event	Unknown	
Ringo Mendoza (hair)	El Brazo (hair)	Unknown	Live event	Unknown	
El Brazo (mask)	Frankenstein I (mask)	Mexico City, Mexico	Live event	October 26, 1980	
El Brazo (mask)	Antares (mask)	Mexico City, Mexico	Live event	December 6, 1981	
El Brazo (mask)	Coloso (mask)	Ixtlahuaca, Mexico State	Live event	September 5, 1983	
Los Brazos (masks) (Brazo de Plata and El Brazo)	Los Corsarios (masks) (Corsario I and Corsario II)	UWA Live event	Mexico City, Mexico	August 3, 1986	
Los Villanos (mask) (Villano I, Villano IV and Villano V)	Los Brazos (mask) (Brazo de Oro, Brazo de Plata and El Brazo)	Monterrey, Nuevo León	Live event	August 6, 1986	
Los Brazos (hair) (Brazo de Plata and El Brazo)	El Verdugo and Hombre Bala (hair)	Mexico City, Mexico	Live event	October 21, 1988	
El Brazo (hair)	Black Man (hair)	Naucalpan, Mexico State	Live event	February 7, 1990	
Villano I (hair)	El Brazo (hair)	Naucalpan, Mexico State	Live event	November 16, 1990	
Fabuloso Blondy (hair)	El Brazo (hair)	Mexico City, Mexico	Live event	March 12, 1993	
El Brazo (hair)	Brazo de Oro (hair)	Mexico City, Mexico	Live event	March 31, 1995	(Note: The match also included Brazo de Plata)
Héctor Garza (hair)	El Brazo (hair)	Mexico City, Mexico	Live event	August 4, 1995	
Rambo (hair)	El Brazo (hair)	Mexico City, Mexico	1996 Homenaje a Salvador Lutteroth	March 22, 1996	
El Brazo (hair)	Enrique Vera (hair)	Mexico City, Mexico	Live event	December 13, 1996	
Brazo de Oro, Brazo Cibernético and El Brazo (hair)	Bestia Negra I, Bestia Negra II and Bestia Negra III (hair)	Celaya, Guanajuato	Live event	April 21, 1999	
Mohicano I (hair)	El Brazo (hair)	Iztapalapa, Mexico City	Live event	June 2001	
El Zorro (hair)	El Brazo (hair)	Morelos	Live event	November 25, 2002	
Heavy Metal (hair)	El Brazo (hair)	Monterrey, Nuevo León	Verano de Escándalo (2003)	August 31, 2003	(Note: This was a steel cage match that also included El Zorro, Sangre Chicana, El Texano and Oscar Sevilla.)
Angel Mensajero (mask)	El Brazo (hair)	Mexicali, Baja California	Live event	May 6, 2006	(Note: Captain's Fall Match; Captain Pirata Morgan was already bald so El Brazo was shaved instead.)
El Elegido (mask)	El Brazo (hair)	Veracruz	Guerra de Tianes (2008)	December 6, 2008	(Note: The match also included Brazo de Plata and Electroshock.)
Hijo del Tirantes (hair)	La Braza (hair)	Victoria, Tamaulipas	Live event	September 7, 2013	(Note: This was a steel cage match that also included Black Mamba, Pimpinela Escarlata, Pasion Crystal, Polvo de Estrellas and Nygma.)
El Chapulin Colorado(Hair)	El Brazo (hair)	Ciudad de Mexico	Triplemania celestial 8		

== See also ==
- List of exóticos
