= Psycho Clown =

Mexican wrestler

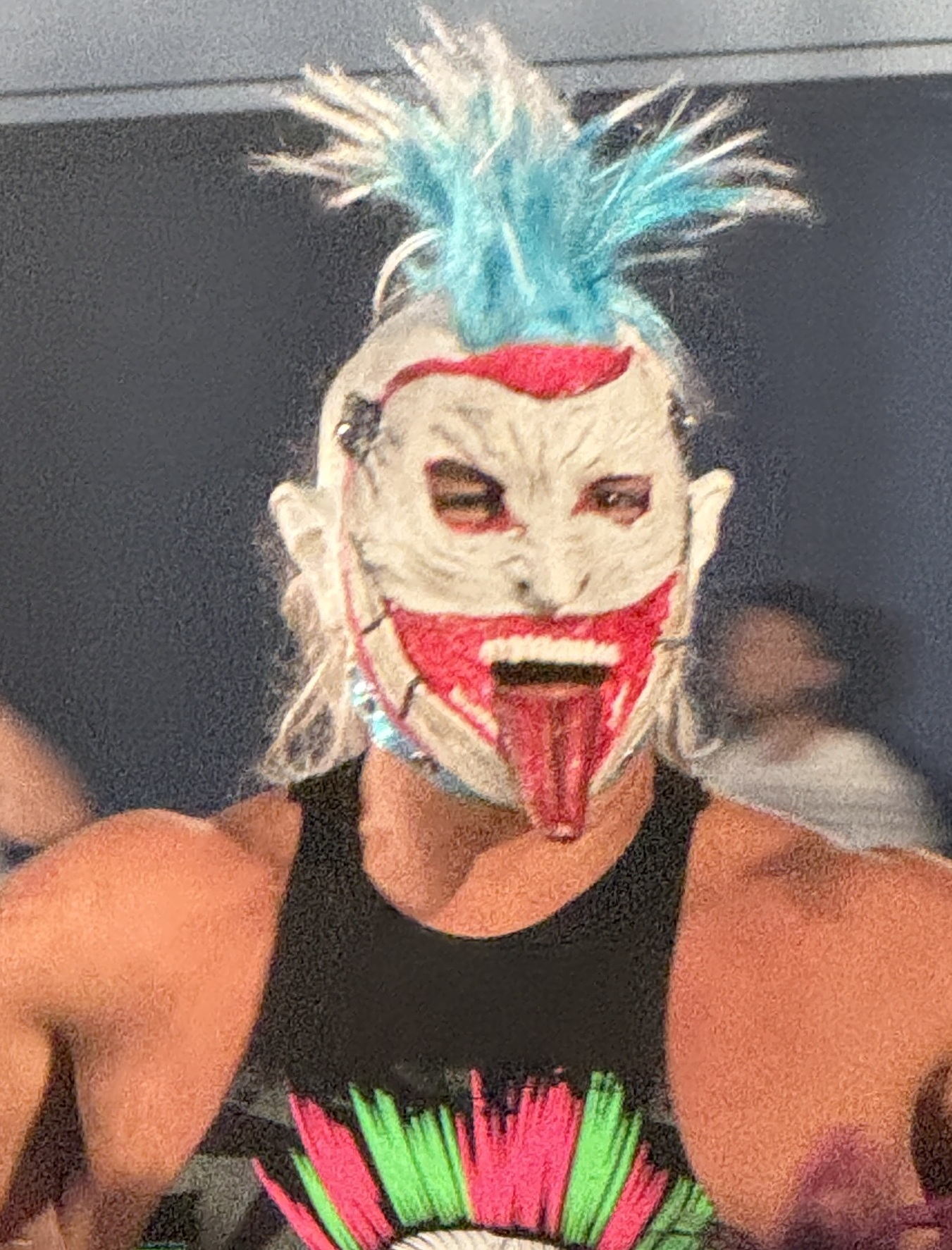
- Psycho Clown in 2024

Personal information
- Born: December 16, 1985 (age 40) Mexico City, Mexico
- Parent: Brazo de Plata (father)
- Relatives: Shadito Cruz (grandfather); Máximo (brother); Goya Kong (sister); La Parka III (nephew)
- Family: The Alvarado family

Professional wrestling career
- Ring name(s): Brazo de Plata Jr. Kronos; Psycho Clown
- Billed height: 185 cm (6 ft 1 in)
- Billed weight: 85 kg (187 lb)
- Billed from: The Psycho Circus; México City, México
- Trained by: Memo Díaz; Gran Apache; El Satánico; Franco Columbo
- Debut: April 20, 2000

Psycho Clown (born December 16, 1985) is the ring name of a Mexican professional wrestler. He is signed to WWE and Lucha Libre AAA Worldwide (AAA). Psycho Clown's real name is not a matter of public record, as is often the case with masked wrestlers in Mexico where their private lives are kept a secret from professional wrestling fans. Part of the Alvarado wrestling family, he is the son of José Alvarado Nieves, who wrestled under the ring name Brazo de Plata, and has previously worked as Brazo de Plata Jr. in tribute to his father. His siblings, Máximo, Goya Kong, and Muñeca de Plata are also professional wrestlers.

In AAA, Psycho Clown's ring character is that of a horror clown and he was originally introduced as part of Los Psycho Circus, a trio along with Monster Clown and Murder Clown. He has headlined numerous AAA pay-per-view events, including six editions of the promotion's flagship event Triplemanía (XXIV, XXV, XXVI, Regia, XXIX, and XXXI: Mexico City).

== Early life ==
The wrestler who would later become known as Psycho Clown was born on December 16, 1985, son of professional wrestler José Alvarado Nieves, better known under the ring names Brazo de Plata or Super Porky. He is one of Alvarado's six children and was the first of them to take up wrestling although he was later joined by at least one brother and two sisters.

== Professional wrestling career ==
=== Independent circuit (2000–2003) ===
He was not trained by his father or any of his uncles for his professional wrestling career, instead Memo Díaz was responsible for training the young Alvarado as well as his brother José Christian. He made his debut in 2000 working as Brazo de Plata Jr. ("Silver Arm Jr."), taking his father's name and adopting the same style mask his father had worn. Early in his career he worked mainly on the Mexican independent circuit for a number of smaller promotions. One of these promotions was the Xtreme Latin American Wrestling (XLAW) promotion which was where he won his first wrestling championship. On December 16, 2001, Brazo de Plata Jr. won the XLAW Junior Heavyweight Championship, only to lose it later in the night to Crazzy Boy.

=== Consejo Mundial de Lucha Libre (2003–2006) ===
In 2003 he along with his brother (now working as Brazo de Platino Jr.) and his cousin (working as Brazo de Oro Jr. began working for Consejo Mundial de Lucha Libre (CMLL) the same company his father worked for. The Junior Brazos started off low in the ranks of CMLL, wrestling in the first or second match of the night, as they were still very inexperienced. While in CMLL he received further training from CMLL's main trainers El Satánico and Franco Colombo In 2005 their fathers decided that it would be better for their sons to not use the "Brazo" name in wrestling, but instead try to create a separate identity for themselves and not live off the Brazo name. Brazo de Platino Jr. became Máximo, Brazo de Oro Jr. became La Máscara and Brazo de Plata Jr. adopted the enmascarado identity "Kronos".

=== Lucha Libre AAA Worldwide ===
==== Brazo de Plata Jr. (2006–2007) ====
Of the three Kronos saw the least amount of success in CMLL and decided to leave the company in 2006. Instead he joined Lucha Libre AAA Worldwide (AAA) at the same time as his father jumped from CMLL to AAA. In AAA he initially worked as "Brazo de Plata Jr.". After joining AAA he received further training from AAA's head trainer Gran Apache, honing his in-ring skills.

==== Los Psycho Circus (2007–2015) ====
In late 2007 AAA decided to repackage Brazo de Plata Jr. turning him into "Psycho Clown" and making him a part of Los Psycho Circus along with Killer Clown and Zombie Clown. All three wrestlers were given rubber masks with twisted, horrific facial expressions inspired by the movie Killer Klowns from Outer Space. As Psycho Clown he wears a mask that includes a foot tall bright red and blue colored Mohawk and a long plastic tongue sticking out of the mouth. The team made their debut on December 14, 2007, during a show in Chilpancingo, Guerrero where they defeated Real Fuerza Aérea (Aero Star, Super Fly and Pegasso). Los Psycho Circus was physically larger than most of the AAA wrestlers and soon established themselves as a dominant force in the ring as they began to amass an exaggerated winning streak. Los Psycho Circus developed a rivalry with The Dark Family, teaming with Chessman to even the sides between the two teams. On January 18, 2009, Los Psycho Circus and Chessman defeated The Dark Family (Dark Cuervo, Dark Escoria, Dark Espiritu, and Dark Ozz) to win the Mexican National Atómicos Championship. The team's run with the Atómicos title ended after just 8 days when AAA Commissioner Vampiro stripped Chessman and Los Psycho Circus of the titles because they had attacked him during a show the night before.

They wrestled at Triplemania XVII, defeating Real Fuerza Aérea (Laredo Kid, Super Fly, and Aero Star) in a sub-three minute match which Los Psycho Circus dominated. Psycho Circus kept their winning streak alive as they defeated La Yakuza (El Oriental, Kenzo Suzuki, and Sugi San) in the opening match of the 2009 Verano de Escandalo. In late 2009 Los Psycho Circus began siding with Cibernético in his feud with Konnan and La Legión Extranjera teaming with him in eight-man matches against La Legión; this was the first time that Los Psycho Circus had teamed up with a tecnico (good guy). At the 2010 Rey de Reyes event Los Psycho Circus serve as Lumberjacks during a Lumberjack match where they kept La Legión from interfering in the match, allowing Cibernético to pin Konnan. During mid-2010 it was announced that Los Psycho Circus ' win streak had reached 600 victories. On October 31, 2010, Los Psycho Circus formed a new alliance named Potencia Mundial (World Power) with AAA Mega Champion Dr. Wagner Jr. On December 5, 2010, at Guerra de Titanes Los Psycho Circus' long undefeated streak came to an end, when Los Perros del Mal (Damián 666, Halloween. and X-Fly) handed them their first ever loss in a steel cage weapons match, thanks to an interference from the leader of Los Perros, El Hijo del Perro Aguayo.

On January 2, 2011, Psycho Clown and Murder Clown represented AAA in the Guerra de Empresas, a battle between different promotions, hosted by International Wrestling Revolution Group (IWRG). After defeating Team Desastre Total Ultraviolento (Crazy Boy and Joe Líder), Los Psycho Circus advanced to the finals, where they defeated Team Los Perros del Mal (Super Crazy and X-Fly) to win the tournament. On April 24, 2011, Los Psycho Circus defeated Los Maniacos (Joe Líder, Silver King, and Último Gladiador), Los Oficiales (Oficial 911, Oficial AK-47, and Oficial Fierro) and Los Perros del Mal (Bestia 666, Damián 666, and X-Fly) in a four-way elimination steel cage match to win the IWRG Intercontinental Trios Championship during IWRG's Guerra de Empresas. The feud between Los Psycho Circus and Los Perros del Mal continued on May 29, 2011, at Perros del Mal Producciones' third anniversary show, where the two groups faced each other in a six-man tag team steel cage Mask vs. Hair Lucha de Apuesta. In the end, Psycho Clown was the last person to escape the cage, leaving behind Super Crazy, who was then forced to have his head shaved bald. The feud continued at Triplemanía XIX, where Damián 666, Halloween, and X-Fly defeated Los Psycho Circus in a tournament final to become the inaugural AAA World Trios Champions. On July 31 at Verano de Escándalo, Los Psycho Circus faced Los Perros del Mal faced in a steel cage match, where the last person left in the cage would lose either his mask or hair. The match ended with Psycho Clown escaping the cage, leaving X-Fly inside and forcing him to have his hair shaved off. On August 28, Los Psycho Circus lost the IWRG Intercontinental Trios Championship to Bestia 666, Damián 666, and X-Fly of Los Perros del Mal in a four-team steel cage match, which also included Los Temerarios (Black Terry, Durok, and Machin) and Los Villanos (Kortiz, Ray Mendoza Jr., and Villano IV). On October 9 at Héroes Inmortales, Los Psycho Circus and Los Perros del Mal ended their year long rivalry, when the clowns defeated Damián 666, Halloween, and Nicho el Millonario in a Mask vs. Hair steel cage match to take their hairs. After a five-month break from the rivalry, Los Psycho Circus defeated Damián 666, Halloween, and X-Fly of Los Perros del Mal on March 11, 2012, to win the AAA World Trios Championship. They lost the title to El Consejo (Máscara Año 2000 Jr., El Texano Jr. and Toscano) on May 19, 2012. Los Psycho Circus regained the title from El Consejo on February 18, 2013. On September 5, Psycho Clown pinned AAA Mega Champion, El Texano Jr., in a six-man captain's fall tag team match to earn his first shot at AAA's top title. He received his title shot on October 18 at Héroes Inmortales VII, but was defeated by El Texano Jr., following a fast count from rudo referee Hijo del Tirantes. This led to another AAA World Trios Championship match on December 8 at Guerra de Titanes, where Los Psycho Circus defeated El Consejo representatives El Texano Jr., El Hijo del Fantasma and Silver King to retain their title. On June 7, 2014, at Verano de Escándalo, Psycho Clown once again failed to capture the AAA Mega Championship from El Texano Jr. after referee Rafael el Maya turned rudo and joined El Consejo. The rivalry between Psycho Clown and El Texano Jr. culminated on August 17 at Triplemanía XXII, where Psycho Clown was victorious in a Lucha de Apuestas between the two, forcing his rival to have his head shaved. Los Psycho Circus lost the AAA World Trios Championship to Los Hell Brothers (Averno, Chessman and Cibernético) on June 14, 2015, at Verano de Escándalo.

==== Singles career (2015–present) ====
On August 31, 2015, Psycho Clown won his first singles title in AAA, when he defeated Chessman for the AAA Latin American Championship. He lost the title to Pentagón Jr. on July 3, 2016. On October 2, 2016, at Héroes Inmortales X, Monster and Murder Clown turned on Psycho Clown and formed a new partnership with his rival Pagano.

On August 26, 2017, Psycho Clown won Dr. Wagner Jr.'s mask in a Lucha de Apuestas at Triplemanía XXV.

On July 21, 2018, at AAA vs. Elite, Clown teamed up with El Hijo del Fantasma and Rey Wagner, representing AAA, as the trio lost to team "Liga Elite" (L.A. Park, Electroshock and Puma King) in the main event, after Fantasma betrayed his team.

=== Impact Wrestling (2019) ===
Psycho Clown appeared in the January 11, 2019 show of IMPACT Wrestling, taped at Mexico City's Frontón México Entertainment Center, defeating Fallah Bahh.

The next day, Clown teamed up with Aero Star, El Hijo del Vikingo and Puma King in an Elimination Match where they defeated Eddie Edwards, Eli Drake, Fallah Bahh & Sami Callihan winning the Impact World Cup.

=== WWE (2025) ===
Following WWE's acquisition of Lucha Libre AAA in 2025, Psycho Clown was revealed for the joint Worlds Collide event, teaming with El Hijo de Dr. Wagner Jr. & Pagano to face Legado Del Fantasma (Santos Escobar, Angel & Berto). He made his SmackDown debut alongside Mr. Iguana on August 1, 2025, in a losing effort to Los Garzas for the AAA World Tag Team Championship.

== In other media ==
Psycho Clown and the rest of Los Psycho Circus are all playable characters in the video game Lucha Libre AAA: Héroes del Ring, which was released at the end of 2010. Psycho Clown appeared at the Electronic Entertainment Expo 2010 (E3) in Las Vegas, Nevada to promote the game.

Psycho Clown, along with Mr. Iguana, El Hijo del Vikingo and Lady Flammer, were announced to be playable superstars within WWE 2K26 as a part of season one of the game's Ringside Pass.

Psycho Clown was a guest judge on the second episode of the first season of the Netflix original series Nailed It: Mexico.

== Personal life ==
While Psycho Clown's real name is not a matter of public record, his paternal and maternal last names are known as it has been revealed that he's the son of José Alvarado Nieves, which makes his paternal last name Alvarado. He is the brother of wrestler Máximo whose real name is José Christian Alvarado Ruiz making Psycho Clown's maternal last name Ruiz as well since they have the same mother. Alvarado is a part of a large wrestling family centered around his father and uncles who have all worked under ring various ring names that include the name "Brazo" (Spanish for "Arm"). His father wrestles as Brazo de Plata, his five uncles have wrestled or currently wrestle under the names Brazo de Oro, El Brazo, Brazo de Platino, Brazo Cibernético, and Super Brazo. Alvarado is the grandson of wrestler Shadito Cruz and the brother of wrestlers Máximo, Goya Kong, and Danah. He is also the cousin of a large number of wrestlers including La Máscara, Brazo Jr., Super Brazo Jr., and Robin. He is the uncle of the current La Parka, who previously worked as the second Brazo de Oro Jr. Psycho Clown is engaged and has a daughter. In April 2015, Psycho Clown got engaged to Zaraida Casas, the daughter of Negro Casas.

On May 19, 2017 footage emerged of a man believed to be an unmasked Psycho Clown and other members of the Alvarado family, including his brother José (Máximo Sexy) and cousins Felipe (La Máscara) and Robin, as well as his uncle Daniel Alvarado (Brazo de Platino), destroying an expensive car belonging to José Gutiérrez, better known as Último Guerrero. The vandalism was reportedly motivated by the fact that Gutiérrez had spoken out against Felipe Alvarado as a possible new head of the wrestler's union after the death of Alvarado's father. The head of the CMLL wrestlers' union had been in the Avarado family for over a decade and the Alvarado family believed it should go to someone in their family. The following day CMLL reportedly fired both Felipe and José Alvarado.

=== Alvarado family tree ===
† = deceased

Shadito Cruz †	Ana Nieves †
Lady Apache	Brazo de Oro †	El Brazo †	Brazo de Plata †	Brazo Cibernético †	Brazo de Platino	Super Brazo	La Alimaña
Aramís	La Máscara	El Brazo Jr.	Máximo	Robin	Super Brazo Jr.
Psycho Clown	India Sioux	Brazo Cibernético II
Carta Brava Jr.	Goya Kong
Danah

== Championships and accomplishments ==
- Alianza Universal De Lucha Libre
  - AULL Master Championship (1 time)
- GALLI Lucha Libre
  - GALLI Indiscutible Championship (1 time)
- Impact Wrestling
  - Impact World Cup of Wrestling (2019) – with Aero Star, El Hijo del Vikingo and Puma King
- International Wrestling League
  - IWL Trios Championship (2 times) – with Monster Clown and Murder Clown
- International Wrestling Revolution Group
  - IWRG Intercontinental Trios Championship (1 time) – with Monster Clown and Murder Clown
  - Guerra de Empresas (January 2011) – with Murder Clown and Psycho Clown
- Invasion RCH
  - Invasion RCH Heavyweight Championship (1 time, inaugural; final)
- Promociones AVE
  - Promociones TC Heavyweight Championship (1 time)
- Lucha Libre AAA Worldwide
  - AAA Latin American Championship (1 time)
  - AAA World Tag Team Champion (2 times) – with Negro Casas (1) and Pagano (1)
  - AAA World Trios Championship (3 times) – with Monster Clown and Murder Clown (2) and Dave the Clown, Murder Clown and Panic Clown (1)
  - Mexican National Atómicos Championship (1 time, final) – with Chessman, Killer Clown and Zombie Clown
  - Lucha Libre World Cup (2017) – with Pagano
  - Rey de Reyes (2022)
- Pro Wrestling Illustrated
  - Ranked No. 41 of the top 500 wrestlers in the "PWI 500" in 2022
- Promociones EMW
  - EMW World Heavyweight Championship (1 time, current)
- Wrestling Observer Newsletter
  - Worst Match of the Year (2015) with Monster Clown and Murder Clown vs. Villano III, Villano IV and Villano V on August 9
- Xtreme Latin American Wrestling
  - X–LAW Junior Heavyweight Championship (1 time)

== Luchas de Apuestas record ==
Winner (wager)	Loser (wager)	Location	Event	Date	Notes
Brazo de Plata Jr. (mask)	Maniqui (hair)	Tehuacan, Puebla	Live event	May 23, 2004	(Note: "Captain of the team loses hair or mask" match between Brazo de Plata Jr., Súper Brazo and Súper Brazo Jr. vs. Maniqui, Máximo and Super Colt.)
Psycho Clown (mask)	Super Crazy (hair)	Mexico City	Aniversario de Los Perros del Mal	May 29, 2011	(Note: Six man tag team steel cage Masks vs. Hairs match, where Los Perros del Mal (Super Crazy, El Hijo del Perro Aguayo and Damián 666) faced Los Psycho Circus (Psycho Clown, Monster Clown and Murder Clown).)
Psycho Clown (mask)	X-Fly (hair)	Guadalajara, Jalisco	Live event	July 31, 2011	(Note: Six man tag team steel cage Masks vs. Hairs match, where Los Psycho Circus faced Los Perros del Mal (X-Fly, Damián 666 and Halloween).)
Los Psycho Circus (masks) (Monster Clown, Murder Clown and Psycho Clown)	Los Perros del Mal (hair) (Halloween, Damián 666 and Nicho el Millonario)	Monterrey, Nuevo León	Heroes Inmortales	October 9, 2011	(Note: Steel cage Masks vs. Hairs match.)
Psycho Clown (mask)	El Texano Jr. (hair)	Mexico City	Triplemanía XXII	August 17, 2014	
Psycho Clown (mask)	Pagano (hair)	Mexico City	Triplemanía XXIV	August 28, 2016	
Dr. Wagner Jr. and Psycho Clown (masks)	Nuevo Poder del Norte (masks) (Carta Brava Jr. and Soul Rocker)	Ciudad Juárez, Chihuahua	Verano de Escándalo	June 4, 2017	(Note: Match also included Monster Clown and Murder Clown)
Psycho Clown (mask)	Dr. Wagner Jr. (mask)	Mexico City	Triplemanía XXV	August 26, 2017	
Psycho Clown (mask)	Rey Escorpión (hair)	Mexico City	Triplemanía XXIX	August 14, 2021	
Psycho Clown (mask)	Sam Adonis (hair)	Mexico City	Triplemanía XXXI	August 12, 2023	(Note: Match also included Rush El Toro Blanco (hair) and L.A. Park (mask))
Psycho Clown (mask)	Estrellato (mask)	Reynosa, Tamaulipas	PantherMania VII	November 26, 2023	
Psycho Clown (mask)	Illegal Immigrant (hair)	Hong Kong	HKWF 15th Anniversary	August 31, 2024	
Psycho Clown (mask)	EL Hijo del Picudo (hair)	Mexico	Producciones Esterales	July 12, 2025	
