= José Aarón Alvarado Nieves =

Mexican professional wrestler (1966–1999)

- Alvarado working under the "Robin Hood" ring character

Personal information
- Born: José Aarón Alvarado Nieves; May 9, 1966 Mexico City, Mexico
- Died: October 27, 1999 (aged 33) Mexico City, Mexico

Professional wrestling career
- Ring name(s): Átomo/Super Átomo; Brazo Cibernético; Brazo de Bronce; Brazo del Futuro; El Arquero; Robin Hood; Sputnik; Tortuguillo Kareteka II
- Billed height: 1.66 m (5 ft 5 1/2 in)
- Billed weight: 92 kg (203 lb)
- Trained by: Brazo de Oro
- Debut: December 15, 1979

José Aarón Alvarado Nieves (May 9, 1966 – October 27, 1999) was a Mexican professional wrestler, best known under the ring names Robin Hood, El Arquero and Brazo Cibernético. José Aarón was a member of the extensive Alvarado wrestling family founded by his father, Shadito Cruz, which includes José Aarón's five brothers and a large number of third-generation wrestlers. Most of the Alvarado family wrestlers are using or have used a ring name including the word "Brazo" ("Arm") at some point in their careers. He died from an infection.

== Professional wrestling career ==
José Aarón Alvarado was the fourth out of six sons of Shadito Cruz to become professional wrestlers, trained by his oldest brother Jesús Alvarado Nieves (better known under the ring name "Brazo de Oro"; Golden Arm) and made his debut on December 15, 1979 under the ring name Sputnik.

=== Robin Hood / Arquero (1980s–1990s) ===
In the early 1980s José Aarón Alvarado decided to adopt a new ring identity but decided to not use the "Brazo" name invoked by his older brothers that worked as Brazo de Oro, Brazo de Plata and El Brazo instead creating the masked character "Robin Hood" after the fictional folk hero. In the early 1980s, Robin Hood teamed up with Pequeño Solín to win the Mexico City-based Distrito Federal Tag Team Championship On March 29, 1984, Robin Hood defeated Frayle Pop in a Luchas de Apuestas, or bet match, forcing Frayle Pop to unmask. At the time it was not revealed that Frayle Pop was in fact José Alvarado's younger brother Martín Alvarado. Over the years Robin Hood began teaming with two other lightweight wrestlers known as Danny Boy and Lasser. The three formed a trio known as Los Arqueros del Espacio ("The Space Archers") and worked as a regular trio in and around Mexico City. The three won the Distrito Federal Trios Championship at one point in time. Lost Arqueros became regular workers for Consejo Mundial de Lucha Libre (CMLL) in the late 1980s. By 1990 Los Arqueros became involved in a long-running storyline feud against another trio called Los Temerarios ("The Terrors"), Black Terry, Jose Luis Feliciano and Shu el Guerrero. Los Arqueros won the Mexican National Trios Championship from Los Temerarios on January 21, 1990 as another chapter of their feud unfolded. The following month Shu El Guerrero defeated Robin Hood in a Luchas de Apuestas match, forcing him to unmask. Following the mask loss Alvarado would at times wrestle as "El Arquero" ("The Archer") when teaming with Danny Boy and Lasser. As part of their feud with Los Temerarios the teams met in a three-on-three Luchas de Apuestas match that left Arquero, Danny Boy and Lasser shaved bald as a result of losing the match. Los Arqueros lost the Mexican National Trios Championship on August 17, 1990 when they were defeated by Los Thundercats (Leono, Panthro and Tigro).

=== Other ring characters (1990s) ===
Following the hair loss and the loss of the Trios title Los Arqueros Alvarado began working under different names and for different promotions. In 1991 he started to work for the Universal Wrestling Association (UWA) as Tortuguillo Kareteka II (Karate Turtle II; characters inspired by the Teenage Mutant Ninja Turtle comic book and cartoon), Alvarado teamed up with three other Tortuguillo Karetekas and wrestled on a series of UWA shows in 1991 and 1992. Due to him being mask he was able to still make occasional appearances as Robin Hood at the time. Later one he started working for CMLL as Átomo or sometimes Super Átomo while still working as a masked turtle in the UWA. Once the Tortuguillo Karetekas were abandoned by the UWA he adopted the ring name "Brazo de Bronce" (Bronce Arm), to team up with his two younger brothers who began working as Súper Brazo and Brazo de Platino ("Platinum Arm") as they wrestle as Los Nuevo Brazos. He also briefly worked as "Brazo de Futuro" ("The Arm of the Future") in CMLL during 1992. In 1992 CMLL booker Antonio Peña left EMLL to form Asistencia Asesoría y Administración (AAA) with Alvarado being one of the wrestlers that joined him, primarily as a trainer in Gimnasio Felipe Ham Lee where AAA rookies trained. In 1994 he travelled to Japan to work a series using the "Robin Hood" ring name, often wrestling with or against his brothers Brazo de Platino and Súper Brazo. While in Japan he briefly held the Universal Wrestling Federation's Super Middleweight Championship.

=== Brazo Cibernético (1996–1999) ===
In 1996 Alvarado adopted another ring character, this time as the masked Brazo Cibernético ("Cybernetic Arm") as he started working for Promo Azteca, an affiliate of AAA. In Promo Azteca he would often team with his brothers, working trios matches on the mid-card. On August 3, 1997, Alvarado lost a Luchas de Apuestas match to Taurus and was forced to unmask. In 1998 he began working for International Wrestling Revolution Group (IWRG) as well as a number of other Mexican Independent promotions. On April 21, 1999, Brazo Cibernético, El Brazo and Brazo de Oro defeated Los Bestias Negras (I, II and III) in a trios Luchas de Apuestas match and thus forced all three Bestia Negras to have their hair shaved off after the match.

== Death ==
José Aarón Alvarado Nieves died from what was described as an "acute infection" on October 27, 1999, with no prior indicators of any health issues.

== The Alvarado family ==
The Alvarado wrestling family spans three generations starting with Shadito Cruz followed by his 6 sons and a third generation of wrestlers that started working in the late 1990s. One of José Aarón Alvarado's sons is currently working for CMLL as Robin (originally "Robin Hood Jr."). There is currently someone wrestling as "Brazo Cibernético Jr." and sometimes only "Brazo Cibernético" on the independent circuit, but it remains unconfirmed how that person is related to the Alvarado family, only that he indeed is a member of the family.

† = deceased

Shadito Cruz †	Ana Nieves †
Lady Apache	Brazo de Oro †	El Brazo †	Brazo de Plata †	Brazo Cibernético †	Brazo de Platino	Super Brazo	La Alimaña
Aramís	La Máscara	El Brazo Jr.	Máximo	Robin	Super Brazo Jr.
Psycho Clown	India Sioux	Brazo Cibernético II
Carta Brava Jr.	Goya Kong
Danah

== Championships and accomplishments ==
- Consejo Mundial de Lucha Libre
  - Mexican National Trios Championship (1 time) – with Lasser and Danny Boy
  - Distrito Federal Trios Championship (1 time) – with Lasser and Danny Boy
- Comisión de Box y Lucha Libre Mexico D.F.
  - Distrito Federal Tag Team Championship (1 time) – Pequeño Solín
- Universal Wrestling Federation (Japan)
  - UWF Super Middleweight Championship

== Luchas de Apuestas record ==
Winner (wager)	Loser (wager)	Location	Event	Date	Notes
Robin Hood (mask)	Frayle Pop (mask)	N/A	Live event	March 29, 1984	
Shu El Guerrero (mask)	Robin Hood (mask)	Naucalpan, Mexico State	Live event	February 4, 1990	
Los Temerarios (hair) (Black Terry, Jose Luis Feliciano, and Shu el Guerrero)	Los Arqueros (hair) (Robin Hood, Danny Boy, and Lasser)	N/A	Live event	N/A	
Taurus (mask)	Brazo Cibernético (mask)	Cancún, Quintana Roo	Live event	August 3, 1997	
Los Brazos (hair) (El Brazo, Brazo de Oro, and Brazo Cibernético)	Los Bestias Negras (hair) (Bestia Negra I, II, and III)	Celaya, Guanajuato	Live event	April 21, 1999	
