= Brazo de Oro (wrestler) =

Mexican professional wrestler

Personal information
- Born: Jesús Alvarado Nieves; October 7, 1959 Mexico City, Mexico
- Died: April 28, 2017 (aged 57) Mexico City, Mexico
- Cause of death: Heart attack
- Spouse: Lady Apache (divorced)
- Children: Felipe de Jesús Alvarado Mendoza (son); Aramís (daughter)

Professional wrestling career
- Ring name(s): Brazo de Oro; El Hombre del Brazo de Oro
- Billed height: 1.70 m (5 ft 7 in)
- Billed weight: 100 kg (220 lb)
- Billed from: Mexico City, Mexico
- Trained by: Shadito Cruz; Felipe Ham Lee
- Debut: 1975
- Retired: 2015

Jesús Alvarado Nieves ([xeˈsus alβaˈɾaðo ˈnjeβes] October 7, 1959 – April 28, 2017) was a Mexican professional wrestler, who worked under the ring name Brazo de Oro ([ˈbɾaso ðe ˈoɾo] Spanish for "Golden Arm"). He was a part of the Alvarado wrestling family, the son of Shadito Cruz and brother of Brazo de Plata, El Brazo, Brazo Cibernético, Super Brazo and Brazo de Platino. His son Felipe de Jesús Alvarado Mendoza currently works as La Máscara for Consejo Mundial de Lucha Libre. His nephews, Máximo Sexy and Psycho Clown are featured wrestlers for CMLL and Lucha Libre AAA Worldwide respectively.

Alvarado made his debut in 1975 and for over a decade wrestled under a mask, until he and his brothers Brazo de Plata and El Brazo lost a Lucha de Apuestas match to Los Villanos in 1988 and was forced to unmask. Over the years he has teamed with his brothers to win various championships such as the CMLL World Trios Championship, Mexican National Tag Team Championship, Mexican National Trios Championship, NWA Americas Tag Team Championship, NWA World Tag Team Championship (Los Angeles version), UWA World Tag Team Championship, UWA World Trios Championship, WWA World Tag Team Championship and WWA World Trios Championship. He started focusing more on behind the scenes activities in the early 1990s, where he worked as one of the bookers for CMLL and served as the head of the wrestlers' union for many years.

== Early life ==
Jesús Alvarado Nieves was born on October 7, 1959, in Mexico City, Mexico, the oldest son of Juan Alvarado Ibarra, better known as professional wrestler Shadito Cruz. Growing up Jesús Alvarado often had to look after his younger brothers, especially when his father was touring Mexico, wrestling several days a week. In a 1991 interview, he recalled how he did not have time to play with other boys, as he was watching over all the Alvarado kids while both his father and mother had to work to make ends meet. At one point he began taking his younger brothers Juan and Pepe to the local wrestling arenas where they sold old wrestling magazines and worked as ushers for tips. Jesús Alvarado began training for a professional wrestling career while still a teenager, despite the misgivings of his father. Local promoter and trainer Felipe Ham Lee began training Alavardo and helped convince his father to let his oldest son train for a wrestling career. When his son was ready to make his in-ring debut Shadito Cruz allowed him to use one of Cruz' old ring names "El Hombre de Brazo de Oro" ("The man with the golden arm"), based on a movie starring Frank Sinatra, but the younger Alvarado soon shortened to simply "Brazo de Oro".

== Pro wrestling career ==
Alvarado made his debut as "Brazo de Oro" an enmascarado (masked wrestler) who worked mainly in tag team action with his brother who worked as Brazo de Plata ("Silver Arm") and in trios action with another brother known simply as El Brazo ("the arm"). Los Brazos, as they were billed, wrestled all over Mexico and made appearances for the Los Angeles-based "NWA Hollywood Wrestling". While working for NWA Hollywood Oro and Plata won the NWA Americas Tag Team Championship from Chino Chou and the Kiss on November 7, 1981. The brothers were also last holders of the Los Angeles version of the NWA World Tag Team Championship in 1982.

=== Losing the masks ===
The mask of Brazo de Oro (same "bicep" design is used for all Brazos masks)

Over the years Brazo de Oro and his brothers competed in a large number of Luchas de Apuestas ("Bet fights") where they put their masks or hair on the line against their opponents. Los Brazo's most famous Luchas de Apuestas occurred on October 21, 1988, when Plata, Oro and El Brazo all placed their masks on the line in a match against another well known Lucha libre family, Los Villanos, in this case Villano I, Villano IV and Villano V. The match was the culmination of a long feud (Storyline) between the two families and saw all six wrestlers bleed profusely during the bout. In the end Los Villanos won the match forcing all three Brazos to unmask and reveal their real names as is tradition in these types of matches. Despite losing their masks Los Brazos remained successful in the ring winning various tag team and trios titles such as the UWA World Tag Team Championship, UWA World Trios Championship, WWA World Tag Team Championship and the WWA World Trios Championship

By the 1990s Los Brazos worked mainly for Consejo Mundial de Lucha Libre (CMLL) where Oro, Plato and El Brazo won the CMLL World Trios Championship from Los Infernales (Pirata Morgan, El Satánico and MS-1) on April 6, 1993. Los Brazos lost the title to Dr. Wagner Jr., Gran Markus Jr. and El Hijo del Gladiador. In the 1990s Brazo de Oro became the head of the wrestler's union, and also worked as a booker for CMLL. From that point on he only wrestled occasionally, on smaller CMLL shows outside of Mexico. In 2006 he announced his retirement, but ended up working select dates and matches until 2015 where he had his last known match.

== Personal life ==
The Alvarado wrestling family spans three generations starting with Shadito Cruz followed by his 6 sons who all took up wrestling, as well as a third-generation of Alvarados who followed in their father or grandfather's footsteps. Jesús Alvarado's younger brothers all adopted a variation of the "Brazo" name that he had made popular, as he began wrestling as El Brazo ("The Arm"), Brazo de Plata ("Silver Arm"), Brazo Cibernético ("Cyborg Arm"), Brazo de Platino ("Platinum Arm") and Super Brazo (Super Arm). At least one of Jesús Alvarado's children followed in his footsteps as his son, Felipe de Jesús Alvarado Mendoza, began his wrestling career under the name "Brazo de Oro Jr." He later changed his name and became better known as La Máscara when all of the then-active third-generation Alvarados stopped using the "Brazo" name and created their own independent characters. In 2013 his daughter made her in-ring debut under the name "Aramís", wearing a modified version of the Brazos mask.

== Death ==
Alvarado was rushed to a Mexico City hospital in the early hours of April 28, 2017, due to respiratory problems. A few hours later he died of a heart attack.

== Alvarado family tree ==
† = deceased

Shadito Cruz †	Ana Nieves †
Lady Apache	Brazo de Oro †	El Brazo †	Brazo de Plata †	Brazo Cibernético †	Brazo de Platino	Super Brazo	La Alimaña
Aramís	La Máscara	El Brazo Jr.	Máximo	Robin	Super Brazo Jr.
Psycho Clown	India Sioux	Brazo Cibernético II
Goya Kong
Danah

== Championships and accomplishments ==
- Consejo Mundial de Lucha Libre

- CMLL World Trios Championship (1 time) – with Brazo de Plata and El Brazo
- Mexican National Tag Team Championship (1 time) – with Brazo de Plata
- Mexican National Trios Championship (2 times) – with Brazo de Plata and El Brazo

- Federación Internacional de Lucha Libre

- FILL Trios Championship (1 time) – with Brazo de Plata and El Brazo

- NWA Hollywood Wrestling

- NWA Americas Tag Team Championship (1 time) – with Brazo de Plata
- NWA World Tag Team Championship (Los Angeles version) (1 time) – with Brazo de Plata

- Universal Wrestling Association

- UWA World Tag Team Championship (1 time) – with Brazo de Plata
- UWA World Trios Championship (3 times) – with Brazo de Plata and El Brazo

- World Wrestling Association

- WWA World Tag Team Championship (1 time) – with Brazo de Plata
- WWA World Trios Championship (1 time) – with Brazo de Plata and El Brazo

- Wrestling Observer Newsletter
  - Wrestling Observer Newsletter Hall of Fame (Class of 2021) as part of Los Brazos
- Mexican regional wrestling

- Distrito Federal Trios Championship (1 time) – with Brazo de Plata and El Brazo
- Distrito Federal Welterweight Championship (1 time)
- Distrito Federal Heavyweight Championship (1 time)
- Puebla Tag Team Championship (1 time) – with Brazo de Plata
- Mexico State Welterweight Championship (1 time)
- Naucalpan Welterweight Championship (1 time)

== Lucha de Apuesta record ==
Winner (wager)	Loser (wager)	Location	Event	Date	Notes
Brazo de Oro (hair)	Roberto Paz (hair)	N/A	Live event	N/A	
Brazo de Oro (hair)	Atila (hair)	N/A	Live event	N/A	
Brazo de Oro (hair)	Frankenstein (mask)	N/A	Live event	N/A	
Brazo de Oro (hair)	Mohicano I (hair)	N/A	Live event	N/A	
Ringo Mendoza (hair)	Brazo de Oro (hair)	N/A	Live event	N/A	
Dr. Wagner Jr. (hair)	Brazo de Oro (hair)	N/A	Live event	N/A	
Brazo de Oro (mask)	Golden Rogers (mask)	Ciudad Juárez, Chihuahua	Live event	1977	(Note: Brazo de Oro, El Hijo del Santo and Huracán Ramírez against Rogers and Atila and Saeta Azteca)
Brazo de Oro (mask)	El Texano (mask)	Naucalpan, Mexico State	Live event	December 4, 1977	
Los Brazos (mask) (Brazo de Oro and Brazo de Plata)	El Migra I and El Migra II (mask)	N/A	Live event	1978	
Brazo de Oro (hair)	Águila Roja (hair)	Monterrey, Nuevo León	Live event	January 29, 1978	(Note: Lost a Relevos suicidas vs. Senor Tormenta and Jungla Negra II.)
Los Brazos (mask) (Brazo de Oro and Brazo de Plata)	Danny Grimaldo and Tauro (mask)	Naucalpan, Mexico State	Live event	February 21, 1979	
Los Brazos (mask) (Brazo de Oro and Brazo de Plata)	Los Wrestling (I and II) (mask)	Mexico City	Live event	July 12, 1981	
Los Brazos (mask) (Brazo de Oro and Brazo de Plata)	Enfermero II and Flama Azul (mask)	Mexico City	Live event	August 22, 1982	(Note: Finals of a 24 man tournament)
Brazo de Oro (mask)	Orión (mask)	Pachuca, Hidalgo	Live event	February 27, 1983	
Brazo de Oro (mask)	Babe Face (hair)	N/A	Live event	August 1985	
Brazo de Oro (mask)	Ultraman (mask)	Tijuana, Baja California	Live event	September 3, 1987	
Los Villanos (masks) (Villano I, Villano IV and Villano V)	Los Brazos (mask) (El Brazo, Brazo de Oro and Brazo de Plata)	Monterrey, Nuevo León	Live event	October 21, 1988	
Brazo de Oro (hair)	El Signo (hair)	Mexico City	Live event	November 28, 1990	
El Hijo del Santo (mask)	Brazo de Oro (hair)	Naucalpan, Mexico State	Live event	January 13, 1991	
Sangre Chicana (hair)	Brazo de Oro (hair)	Mexico City	Live event	June 19, 1992	
Brazo de Oro (hair)	Troglodita (hair)	Mexico City	Live event	December 20, 1992	
Brazo de Oro (hair)	Popitekus (hair)	Mexico City	Live event	November 6, 1993	
El Brazo (hair)	Brazo de Oro (hair)	Mexico City	Live event	March 31, 1995	(Note: Triangle match that also included Brazo de Plata)
Rambo (hair)	Brazo de Oro (hair)	Mexico City	Live event	1996	
Gran Markus, Jr. (hair)	Brazo de Oro (hair)	Mexico City	42. Aniversario de Arena México	April 24, 1998	
Los Brazos (hair) (El Brazo de Oro and Brazo Cibernético)	Las Bestias Negras (hair) (Bestian Negra I, II and III)	Celaya, Guanajuato	Live event	April 22, 1999	
El Satánico (hair)	Brazo de Oro (hair)	Mexico City	Live event	November 29, 1999	
Brazo de Oro (hair)	Valentín Mayo (hair)	Mexico City	Live event	May 11, 2000	
El Signo (hair)	Brazo de Oro (hair)	Oaxaca, Oaxaca	Live event	February 11, 2001	
Negro Navarro (hair)	Brazo de Oro (hair)	Nezahualcóyotl, Mexico State	Live event	June 1, 2001	
Brazo de Oro (hair)	Toro Salvaje (hair)	Tuxtla Gutiérrez, Chiapas	Live event	December 2001	
Villano III (mask)	Brazo de Oro (hair)	Naucalpan, Mexico State	Live event	August 8, 2002	
Nitro (mask)	Brazo de Oro (hair)	Tlalnepantla, Mexico State	Live event	April 16, 2003	(Note: This was a steel cage match with Pierroth, Jr., Violencia, Brazo de Oro, Jr. and Brazo de Plata.)
Los Brazos (hair) (Brazo de Oro and Super Brazo)	Bestial and Impacto (hair)	Cuernavaca, Morelos	Live event	January 15, 2004	
Villano III (hair)	Brazo de Oro (hair)	N/A	Live event	July 11, 2004	(Note: Losers of a match a week earlier vs. Shocker and Perro Aguayo, Jr.)
Villano IV (mask)	Brazo de Oro (hair)	Acapulco, Guerrero	Live event	November 20, 2004	(Note: Los Brazos vs. Los Villanos steel cage match.)
Villano III (hair)	Brazo de Oro (hair)	Querétaro	Live event	January 3, 2006	
Cesar Dántes (hair)	Brazo de Oro (hair)	Guadalajara, Jalisco	Live event	July 16, 2007	(Note: This was a steel cage match that also included Brazo de Platino, Super Brazo, Danger and Asesino Negro.)
Exterminador (hair)	Brazo de Oro (hair)	Guadalajara, Jalisco	Live event	December 16, 2007	
