= Shadito Cruz =

Mexican professional wrestler (1915–2003)

- Shadito Cruz surrounded by second and third-generation Alvarados

Personal information
- Born: Juan Alvarado Ibarra; January 7, 1915 Mexico City, Mexico
- Died: February 3, 2003 (aged 88) Mexico City, Mexico
- Cause of death: Alzheimer's disease

Professional wrestling career
- Ring name(s): El Hombre del Brazo de Oro; Shadito Cruz

Juan Alvarado Ibarra (January 7, 1915 - February 3, 2003) was a Mexican professional wrestler, better known under the ring name Shadito Cruz. Best known as the patriarch of the Alvarado wrestling family that includes six of Alvarado's sons and many of his grandchildren, Cruz achieved little success as a wrestler but became a well respected trainer. He trained members of his own family as well as a large number of non-family members

== Professional wrestling career ==
Early in his career Juan Alvarado was given the nickname "Shadito" due to his physical resemblance to professional wrestler Black Shadow, which stuck with him as a ring name. His wrestling career as Shadito Cruz was not very notable, partially because Cruz was physically very small. At the time of his peak years, Mexican wrestling focused more on the Welterweight and Middleweight divisions. In 1975 he decided to try a different ring character as he took the name of a Frank Sinatra movie The Man with the Golden Arm and became "El Hombre del Brazo de Oro" for a few months. When his son Jesús Alvarado Nieves made his debut in 1975, Shadito Cruz gave the ring character to his son and instead of wrestling decided on training young wrestlers instead, including most of his six sons for their professional wrestling careers as well as become a referee. Over the years six of Alvarado's sons became professional wrestlers, all using the word "Brazo" in their ring names.

== Death ==
Alvarado died on February 3, 2003, as a consequence of his Alzheimer's disease.

== The Alvarado family ==
The Alvarado wrestling family spans three generations starting with Shadito Cruz followed by his six sons and a third-generation of wrestlers that started working in the late 1990s. Daniel Alvarado Nieves, the youngest Alvarado sibling, wrestled as "Shadito Cruz, Jr." early in his career before using the ring name "Brazo de Platino" (Platinum Arm). On February 17, 2013, the Alvarado family held a special Homenaje a Shadito Cruz ("Homage to Shadito Cruz") show, featuring the La Copa Shadito Cruz tag team tournament. The show honored both Cruz and his wife Ana Nieves and the family traditions they had inspired.

† = deceased

Shadito Cruz †	Ana Nieves †
Lady Apache	Brazo de Oro †	El Brazo†	Brazo de Plata†	Brazo Cibernético †	Brazo de Platino	Super Brazo	La Alimaña
Aramís	La Máscara	El Brazo Jr.	Máximo	Robin	Super Brazo Jr.
Psycho Clown	India Sioux	Brazo Cibernético II
Carta Brava Jr.	Goya Kong
Danah

== Wrestlers trained ==
- Angel O Demonio
- Averno
- Axxel
- Babe Face
- Bracito de Oro
- Brazo de Oro
- Brazo de Plata
- Brazo de Platino
- El Brazo
- La Comandante
- La Máscara
- Máscara Sagrada
- Máximo
- Rey Persa
- Shu El Guerrero
- Súper Brazo
- TNT
