= Súper Brazo =

Mexican professional wrestler

Personal information
- Born: Martín Antonio Alvarado Nieves; March 7, 1968 (age 58) Mexico City, Mexico
- Website: Facebook page

Professional wrestling career
- Ring name(s): Frayle Pop; Súper Brazo
- Billed height: 1.71 m (5 ft 7 1/2 in)
- Billed weight: 135 kg (298 lb)
- Trained by: Shadito Cruz
- Debut: July 7, 1983

Martín Antonio Alvarado Nieves (born March 7, 1968) is a Mexican professional wrestler best known under the ring name Súper Brazo (Spanish for "Super Arm") and is part of an extensive Alvarado wrestling family that was founded by his father Shadito Cruz and includes Alvarado's five brothers as well as a large number of third-generation wrestlers. Most of the wrestlers in the Alvarado family is using or has used a ring name with the word "Brazo" ("Arm") in it at some point in their career. Martín Alvarado has worked for a number of Mexican professional wrestling promotion, but is currently working on the Mexican Independent circuit and not permanently for one specific promotion.

== Professional wrestling career ==
Martín Alvarado was trained by his father Shadito Cruz before making his professional wrestling career on July 7, 1983. Initially he wrestled as an masked character called "Frayle Pop", but lost that mask as a result of a Luchas de Apuestas, or "bet match" loss to Robin Hood and revealed that he was part of the Alvarado family. At the time it was not revealed that Robin Hood was actually a brother of Martín Alvarado, José Aarón Alvarado Nieves. A few years later he took the family ring name and became known as Súper Brazo, including the signature "Brazo" mask with the logo of a man flexing his biceps on the front of it. While his three oldest brothers had worked as "Los Brazos" and other Brazos had at times replaced one of them, Super Brazo, Brazo Cibernético (formerly Robin Hood) and Brazo de Platino work as Los Nuevo Brazos for the Universal Wrestling Association starting in 1992. Later on Súper Brazo worked for Consejo Mundial de Lucha Libre (CMLL), the world's oldest and one of Mexico's largest wrestling promotions. In CMLL he became involved in a storyline with Mr. Niebla that escalated to the point that both wrestlers put their mask on the line in a Luchas de Apuestas match. The match took place on July 16, 1995, and was won by Mr. Niebla, forcing Súper Brazo to unmask. In the years following his mask loss Súper Brazo became a regular on the Mexican Independent Circuit, especially around Mexico City, oftentimes teaming with Brazo de Platino and Brazo Cibernético until his death in 1999.

Over the years Súper Brazo became more of a "Special attraction" wrestler, brought in by a promoter for a few events but not working regularly, long term for any promotion. Súper Brazo, as well as most of the other second-generation Alvarado brothers often lost their hair in Luchas de Apuestas matches, losing to wrestlers such as Apolo Dantés, Máscara Año 2000, Villano III, Veneno, Pierroth, Jr. and others. Súper Brazo has even won the hair of his brother Brazo de Platino on at least two occasions, both times as a result of the brothers losing a Relevos Suicidas where they were forced to fight each other as a result. On February 2, 2013, Súper Brazo and Brazo de Platino took part in another chapter in the decade long feud between the Alvarado brothers and Los Villanos as the two lost a Luchas de Apuestas to Villano III and Villano IV and was once again shaved bald. On February 17, 2013, Súper Brazo and the rest of the Alvarado family held a special show, Homenaje a Shadito Cruz ("Homage to Shadito Cruz") where he teamed up with his brother Brazo de Platino and competed in the La Copa Shadito Cruz tournament, defeating El Hijo de Fishman and El Hijo de Canek before losing to their nephews Máximo and La Máscara in the semi-finals of the tournament.

== The Alvarado family ==
The Alvarado wrestling family spans three generations starting with Shadito Cruz followed by his 6 sons and a third-generation of wrestlers that started working in the late 1990s. Several wrestlers has used the ring name "Súper Brazo" and claimed to be related to Martín Alvarado, although in some cases the family connection is fictional. Alvarado himself confirmed that the Súper Brazo, Jr. that made his debut around 2000, is indeed a biological son, but a later "Super Brazo II" was not, but given the character by Alvarado to carry on the name. The wrestler currently known as Brazo Celestial started out in 2009 wrestling as "Super Brazo, Jr." but may not be the son of Martin Alvarado. There are cases where the sons of José Alvarado Nieves (Brazo de Plata) have used the ring names of their uncles as there was already someone working as "Brazo de Plata, Jr." It remains unconfirmed how Brazo Celestial is related to the Alvarado family, only that he indeed is a member of the family.

† = deceased

Shadito Cruz † | Ana Nieves †
Lady Apache | Brazo de Oro † | El Brazo † | Brazo de Plata † | Brazo Cibernético † | Brazo de Platino | Super Brazo | La Alimaña
Aramís | La Máscara | El Brazo Jr. | Máximo | Robin | Super Brazo Jr.
Psycho Clown | India Sioux | Brazo Cibernético II
Carta Brava Jr. | Goya Kong
Danah

== Luchas de Apuestas record ==
| Winner (wager) | Loser (wager) | Location | Event | Date | Notes |
|---|---|---|---|---|---|
| Robin Hood (mask) | Frayle Pop (mask) | N/A | Live event | March 29, 1984 | |
| Mr. Niebla (mask) | Súper Brazo (mask) | Naucalpan, Mexico State | Live event | July 16, 1995 | |
| Apolo Dantés (hair) | Súper Brazo (hair) | N/A | Live event | N/A | |
| Máscara Año 2000 (mask) | Súper Brazo (hair) | N/A | Live event | N/A | |
| El Pandita (hair) | Súper Brazo (hair) | Mexico City | Live event | July 18, 1998 | |
| Ángel Satánico (hair) | Súper Brazo (hair) | Pista la Grapa, Mexico State | Live event | August 6, 2000 | |
| Súper Brazo (hair) | Bestial (hair) | Cuernavaca, Morelos | Live event | January 2002 | |
| Villano III (hair) | Súper Brazo (hair) | Cuernavaca, Morelos | Live event | February 28, 2002 | |
| Veneno (hair) | Súper Brazo (hair) | Mexico City | Live event | May 25, 2002 | |
| Pierroth, Jr. (hair) | Súper Brazo (hair) | Cuernavaca, Morelos | Live event | October 17, 2002 | |
| Súper Brazo (hair) | Impacto (hair) | Cuernavaca, Morelos | Live event | April 30, 2003 | |
| Pierroth, Jr. (hair) | Súper Brazo (hair) | Cuernavaca, Morelos | Live event | 2003 | |
| Súper Brazo (hair) | Bestial (hair) | Cuernavaca, Morelos | Live event | July 24, 2003 | |
| Tony Rivera (hair) | Súper Brazo (hair) | Cuernavaca, Morelos | Live event | August 7, 2003 | |
| Brazo de Oro and Súper Brazo (hair) | Bestial and Impacto (hair) | Cuernavaca, Morelos | Live event | January 15, 2004 | (Note: Last two wrestlers in a steel cage match) |
| Zumbido and Súper Brazo (hair) | Brazo de Platino and Crazy 33 (hair) | Cuernavaca, Morelos | Live event | July 1, 2004 | |
| Villano III (hair) | Súper Brazo (hair) | Tampico, Tamaulipas | Live event | February 14, 2005 | (Note: Losers in a four-way match that also included Villano IV and Brazo de Platino) |
| Sangre Chicana, Jr. (hair) | Súper Brazo (hair) | Nuevo Laredo, Tamaulipas | Live event | July 18, 2005 | |
| Súper Brazo (hair) | Brazo de Platino (hair) | Tampico, Tamaulipas | Live event | September 21, 2005 | (Note: Lost a Relevos Suicidas match to Bronco and Bulldozer and were forced to wrestle each other.) |
| Johnny Villalobos (hair) | Súper Brazo (hair) | Mexico City | Live event | November 11, 2006 | |
| Súper Brazo (hair) | Holligan (II) (hair) | Cuernavaca, Morelos | Live event | March 29, 2007 | |
| Súper Brazo (hair) | Brazo de Platino (hair) | Mexico City | Live event | April 21, 2007 | (Note: Lost a Relevos Suicidas match to Villano IV and Villano V, Coco Blanco and Coco Verde, Pierroth, Jr. and Emilio Charles, Jr. and were forced to wrestle each other.) |
| Virus (hair) | Súper Brazo (hair) | Xalapa, Veracruz | Live event | April 15, 2010 | (Note: Last two wrestlers in a steel cage match that also included El Texano, Jr., Máximo, Okumura, Rush, Taichi and Tony Rivera.) |
| Los Villanos (Villano III (hair) and Villano IV (mask)) | Los Nuevo Brazos (hair) (Brazo de Platino and Súper Brazo) | Tlalnepantla de Baz, Mexico State | Live event | February 2, 2013 | |
