= La Máscara =

Mexican professional wrestler

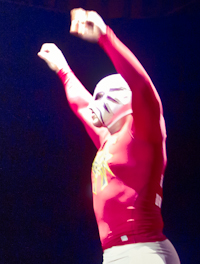
- La Máscara in 2011

Personal information
- Born: January 8, 1982 (age 44) Mexico City, Mexico
- Family: The Alvarado family

Professional wrestling career
- Ring name(s): Brazo de Oro Jr. La Máscara
- Billed height: 1.75 m (5 ft 9 in)
- Billed weight: 85 kg (187 lb)
- Trained by: Brazo De Oro
- Debut: April 2, 2000

Felipe de Jesús Alvarado Mendoza (born January 8, 1982), better known by La Máscara, is a Mexican professional wrestler. He is best known for his time with Consejo Mundial de Lucha Libre (CMLL) and Lucha Libre AAA Worldwide (AAA).

Alvarado debuted in 2000 under the name Brazo de Oro Jr. ("Golden Arm Jr.") and joined CMLL that year. During his tenure, he won several championships, including the CMLL World Light Heavyweight Championship, CMLL World Tag Team Championship, CMLL World Trios Championship, NWA World Historic Middleweight Championship, Mexican National Light Heavyweight Championship, Mexican National Trios Championship, and Mexican National Welterweight Championship. He was also a founding member of Los Ingobernables along with Rush and La Sombra. After being fired from CMLL in 2017, he joined AAA the following year, where he was the co-founder and leader of Los Mercenarios (alongside El Hijo del Fantasma, Rey Escorpión, and Texano Jr.). He has also wrestled in Japan for New Japan Pro-Wrestling (NJPW).

Alvarado is the son of Jesús Alvarado Nieves, better known under the name Brazo de Oro. Many of the Alvarado family have been, or currently are professional wrestlers, including family patriarch Shadito Cruz and uncles who worked under the ring names Brazo de Plata, El Brazo, Brazo Cibernético. Brazo de Platino and Súper Brazo. Many of Felipe Alvarado's cousins are also wrestlers, including Psycho Clown, Máximo Sexy and Goya Kong among others.

== Personal life ==
Felipe de Jesús Alvarado Mendoza was born on January 8, 1982, son of Jesús Alvarado Nieves and grandson of Juan Alvarado Ibarra, better known under the professional wrestling ring name Shadito Cruz. Jesús Alvarado and five of his brothers had following in Shadito Cruz's footsteps and all became professional wrestlers as well. Jesús Alvarado was the oldest brother and became known as Brazo de Oro ('Golden Arm") while his brothers would be known as Brazo de Plata ('Silver Arm"), El Brazo ("The Arm"), Brazo Cibernético ("Cyborg Arm"), Brazo de Platino ("Platinum Arm") and Súper Brazo. for a while Jesús Alvarado was married to Sandra González Calderón, better known as Lady Apache, Felipe Alvarado's step mother. Growing up Felipe Alvarado and several of his cousins would often attend wrestling events together, which led to Felipe and his cousins José Christian Alvarado (later known as Máximo) and the wrestler later known as Psycho Clown (real name unrevealed). Several of his cousins would later follow them into the wrestling business such as Robin, Goya Kong, Muñeca de Plata, Brazo Cibernetico Jr. and Brazo Celestial. Over the years several wrestler have paid to use the "Brazo" name, leading to some confusion and uncertainty to how many Alvarado family members have actually been professional wrestlers; it has been confirmed that Brazo Metálico, Brazo Jr. and Andros de Plata were not related to the Alvarado family.

== Professional wrestling career ==
=== Consejo Mundial de Lucha Libre (2000–2017) ===
==== Brazo de Oro Jr. (2000–2005) ====
Felipe Alvarado received most of his early training from his father, often in Consejo Mundial de Lucha Libre (CMLL), where his father served as a trainer for several CMLL trainees. He made his official wrestling debut on April 2, 2000, using the ring name "Brazo de Oro Jr.", wearing the same mask design as his father. He often teamed up with his cousins (José Christian Alvarado and his brother), who worked as Brazo de Platino Jr. and Brazo de Plata Jr. respectively, collectively referred to as Los Brazos Junior. The trio worked primarily for CMLL, normally in the early parts of the shows as they gained in-ring experience. During the summer of 2002, Brazo de Oro Jr. was involved in his first significant storyline feud against a local Oaxaca wrestler known as Némesis. (Note: It is unclear who used the Némesis name in Oaxaca, it was not Antheus Ortiz Chávez who used the same ring name in 2005.) On August 24, Brazo de Oro Jr. defeated Némesis in a Lucha de Apuestas ("bet match"), after which Némesis was forced to unmask. In lucha libre, the Lucha de Apuestas matches are generally considered more prestigious than winning a championship.

Through CMLL's working relationship with International Wrestling Revolution Group (IWRG), Los Brazos Junior worked several major shows for the promotion, including the Arena Naucalpan 26th Anniversary Show on December 21, 2003, where they defeated the trio of Angel de Tijuana and Los Megas (Mega and Ultra Mega), and the subsequent IWRG 8th Anniversary Show on January 1, 2004, where they defeated Los Comandos (Comando Alfa, Comando Delta and Comando Gama).

==== La Máscara (2005–2017) ====
In 2005, all of the Brazos Junior members took on a new name, creating their own identity; Felipe Alvarado became "La Máscara" ("The Mask"), an enmascarado (masked character). In May, he won his first major championship, defeating Doctor X for the Mexican National Welterweight Championship. He held the title for over a year, but lost it to Sangre Azteca on December 17, 2006. Earlier that year, he lost to Hajime Ohara in a match for the then-vacant NWA World Welterweight Championship in Mexico City. On June 13, 2008, La Máscara, El Hijo del Fantasma and Héctor Garza won a tournament final for the vacant CMLL World Trios Championship, defeating Blue Panther, Dos Caras Jr. and Místico. The three lost the titles to Atlantis, Negro Casas and Último Guerrero on August 5, but regained them on January 18, 2009. On January 29, 2010, La Máscara and Casas participated in CMLL's Torneo Nacional de Parejas Increíbles ("National Amazing Pairs Tournament"), a tournament where a tecnico ("good guy") is paired with a rúdo ("bad guy"). The two defeated El Texano Jr. and Rouge in the opening round, El Sagrado and Shocker in the second round and Héctor Garza and Toscano in the semi-final to earn a spot in the finals on February 5, where they lost to Atlantis and Máscara Dorada.

In March, signs of dissention amongst the trios champions began showing as Garza walked out on the team during a trios match, mistakenly thinking that one of his teammates had attacked him. Garza kept insincerely insisting that he was still a tecnico and that his team was getting along great. Further doubts about Garza's allegiance arose when he teamed up with the rúdo Pólvora to win the 2010 Torneo Gran Alternativa ("Great Alternative Tournament"). When Garza, La Máscara and Hijo del Fantasma were booked for a trios championship defense the following week, Garza complained that his partners agreed to the match without asking him, but swore that he would still be professional about it. During the title defense on the May 7 Super Viernes, Garza attacked both of his partners, allowing La Ola Amarilla (Hiroshi Tanahashi, Okumura and Taichi) to win the CMLL World Trios Championship, turning full blown rúdo in the process. After winning a non-title match, La Máscara, La Sombra and Dorada defeated La Ola Amarilla for the titles on May 21. By virtue of holding the CMLL World Trios Championship, La Máscara participated in the Universal Championship tournament; he was part of "Block B" that competed on the August 6 Super Viernes. After defeating Mr. Águila in the first round, he moved on to the second round against Volador Jr., who turned rúdo and got himself disqualified for excessive violence. After the match, Volador Jr. beat up La Máscara further, leaving him an easy target for his third round opponent, Jushin Thunder Liger, who quickly defeated La Máscara. On October 5, La Máscara defeated Volador Jr. to win the Mexican National Light Heavyweight Championship.

In April 2011, La Máscara began feuding with the WWE-bound Averno, which led to CMLL booking the two to face each other in a Mask vs. Mask Lucha de Apuestas on June 17 at Juicio Final ("Final Judgment"), where La Máscara picked up the biggest win of his career by defeating Averno two falls to one, forcing him to unmask himself. Afterwards, La Máscara and Averno continued their rivalry, building up to another singles match on July 4, where Averno successfully defended the NWA World Historic Middleweight Championship. On July 15, La Generación Dorada lost the CMLL World Trios Championship to Los Hijos del Averno (Averno, Ephesto and Mephisto). After La Máscara pinned Averno in a six-man tag team match on July 22, the two agreed to another match for the NWA World Historic Middleweight Championship on July 29, where Averno was again able to retain the title. On September 9, La Máscara lost to Averno in the second round of the Universal Championship tournament. On November 22, La Máscara defeated Averno to win the NWA World Historic Middleweight Championship, but lost it to Volador Jr. on February 14, 2012. La Máscara was once again forced to team up with Averno for the following year's Torneo Nacional de Parejas Increibles. The team worked together without too many problems in the first round, defeating El Hijo de Fantasma and El Felino, but stumbled in the second round as they lost to eventual winners La Sombra and Volador Jr. On June 30, La Máscara, Rush and Titán defeated Los Invasores (Kráneo, Mr. Águila and Psicosis) to win the Mexican National Trios Championship. On August 13, La Máscara lost the Mexican National Light Heavyweight Championship to Mephisto. On October 18, La Máscara and Rush were awarded the CMLL World Tag Team Championship, when Rey Bucanero, one half of the previous champions, was unable to defend the title due to an injury. On February 18, 2014, La Máscara, Rush and Titán lost the Mexican National Trios Championship to La Peste Negra (Felino, Mr. Niebla and Negro Casas). On June 13, La Máscara and Rush lost the CMLL World Tag Team Championship to Casas and Shocker.

==== Los Ingobernables (2014–2017) ====
During the summer, La Máscara formed a trio named Los Ingobernables ("The Ungovernables") with Rush and La Sombra, with the three essentially wrestling as rudos and being referred to as the most hated wrestlers in the past decade. On April 8, 2016, La Máscara defeated Ángel de Oro to win the CMLL World Light Heavyweight Championship. After the match, he got into an altercation with Ángel de Oro's corner man, Dragon Lee. On May 13, the partnership between La Máscara and Rush came to an end when Rush and Pierroth turned on their Los Ingobernables stablemate. Following the turn, La Máscara declared war on the entire Muñoz family, which included Rush, Pierroth, Dragon Lee and Místico. La Máscara won that year's Leyenda de Plata ("The Silver Legend") tournament by defeating Casas in the finals on July 22. On August 5, La Máscara accepted a challenge from Dragon Lee for a Mask vs. Mask Lucha de Apuestas between the two. On September 2, in the main event of the CMLL 83rd Anniversary Show, La Máscara lost to Lee and was forced to unmask and reveal his birth name. Afterwards, La Máscara reconciled with Rush.

On May 19, 2017, footage emerged of Felipe Alvarado and other members of the Alvarado family, including his cousins José (Máximo Sexy), Psycho Clown and Robin, as well as his uncle Daniel Alvarado (Brazo de Platino), destroying an expensive car belonging to José Gutiérrez, better known as Último Guerrero. The vandalism was reportedly motivated by the fact that Gutiérrez had spoken out against Felipe Alvarado as a possible head of the wrestler's union after the death of Alvarado's father. The head of the CMLL wrestlers' union had been in the Alvarado family for over a decade, and the Alvarado family believed it should go to someone in their family. On May 22, CMLL publicly fired both Felipe and José Alvarado, as well as Bobby Villa, while also stripping the two Alvarados of their titles.

=== New Japan Pro-Wrestling (2011–2013) ===
On January 22, 2011, La Máscara made his Japanese debut, taking part in the Fantastica Mania 2011 weekend, co-promoted by CMLL and New Japan Pro-Wrestling (NJPW) in Tokyo. During the first night, he teamed with Tiger Mask in a loss to Dragón Rojo Jr. and Tomohiro Ishii. The following night, he, Máscara Dorada and La Sombra successfully defended the CMLL World Trios Championship against La Ola Amarilla (Okumura, Tetsuya Naito and Yujiro Takahashi).

On January 18, 2013, La Máscara returned to Japan to take part in the three-day Fantastica Mania 2013 event. During the first night, he teamed with Dorada and Máximo in a six-man tag team match, where they lost to Taichi, Taka Michinoku and Volador Jr. During the second night, he, Hiroshi Tanahashi and Rush lost to Kazuchika Okada, Rey Escorpión and Volador Jr. During the third and final night, La Máscara successfully defended the Mexican National Light Heavyweight Championship against Volador Jr. On April 7, at Invasion Attack, he and Valiente unsuccessfully challenged El Terrible and Tama Tonga for the CMLL World Tag Team Championship.

=== The Crash (2017–2018) ===
On May 30, 2017, La Máscara and Máximo made a surprise appearance for The Crash Lucha Libre, confronting members of the La Rebelión stable. The cousins were originally announced as being booked to wrestle against L.A. Park and Dr. Wagner Jr. in the main event of a Lucha Libre Boom! show, but it was later announced that the match had been changed to L.A. Park vs. Dr. Wagner Jr., as Lucha Libre AAA Worldwide (AAA) did not want wrestlers under contract with AAA (Wagner) to work with La Máscara and Máximo at the moment. In September, Rush and Pierroth arrived in The Crash, reuniting with La Máscara and starting a rivalry between Los Ingobernables and La Rebelión.

=== Lucha Libre AAA Worldwide (2018–2019) ===
On January 26, La Máscara along with Máximo made their debut in Guerra de Titanes to help Maximo's brother Psycho Clown and thus forming his team called, Los Mosqueteros del Diablo ("The Musketeers of the Devil").

On May 4, 2019, La Mascara announced his departure from the AAA and declared himself independent.

== Alvarado family tree ==
† = deceased

Shadito Cruz †	Ana Nieves †
Lady Apache	Brazo de Oro †	El Brazo †	Brazo de Plata †	Brazo Cibernético †	Brazo de Platino	Super Brazo	La Alimaña
Aramís	La Máscara	El Brazo Jr.	Máximo	Robin	Super Brazo Jr.
Psycho Clown	India Sioux	Brazo Cibernético II
Carta Brava Jr.	Goya Kong
Danah

== Championships and accomplishments ==
- Consejo Mundial de Lucha Libre
  - CMLL World Light Heavyweight Championship (1 time)
  - CMLL World Tag Team Championship (1 time) – with Rush
  - CMLL World Trios Championship (3 times) – with Héctor Garza and El Hijo del Fantasma (2), Máscara Dorada and La Sombra (1)
  - Mexican National Light Heavyweight Championship (1 time)
  - Mexican National Trios Championship (1 time) – Rush and Titán
  - Mexican National Welterweight Championship (1 time)
  - NWA World Historic Middleweight Championship (1 time)
  - CMLL World Tag Team Championship #1 Contender's Tournament (2013) – with Rush
  - Leyenda de Plata (2016)
  - Reyes del Aire (2006)
  - CMLL Tecnico of the Year (2009)
  - Torneo Gran Alternativa (2005) – with Atlantis
  - CMLL Trio of the Year (2009) – with Héctor Garza and El Hijo del Fantasma
  - CMLL Trio of the Year (2010) – with Máscara Dorada and La Sombra
  - CMLL Bodybuilding Contest – Advanced (2014)
- Pro Wrestling Illustrated
  - PWI ranked him # 82 of the 500 best singles wrestlers of the PWI 500 in 2012

== Luchas de Apuestas record ==
Winner (wager)	Loser (wager)	Location	Event	Date	Notes
Brazo de Oro Jr. (mask)	Némesis (mask)	Oaxaca, Mexico	Live event	August 24, 2002	
La Máscara (mask)	Mosco de la Merced (hair)	Aguascalientes, Aguascalientes	Live event	August 4, 2005	
La Máscara (mask)	Averno (mask)	Mexico City	Juicio Final	June 17, 2011	
Dragon Lee (mask)	La Máscara (mask)	Mexico City	CMLL 83rd Anniversary Show	September 2, 2016	
La Máscara (Goya Kong's hair)	Máximo (Brazo de Plata's hair)	Benito Juarez, Distrito Federal	AAA/Legends show	February 1, 2019	(Note: Each wrestler bet the hair of their second instead of their own.)
