= Robin (wrestler) =

Mexican professional wrestler

Personal information
- Born: Robin Ivan Alvarado Dominguez; November 9, 1990 (age 35) Mexico City, Mexico

Professional wrestling career
- Ring name(s): Brazo Cibernetico Jr. Brazo de Plata Jr. Robin; Robin Hood Jr.
- Billed height: 1.66 m (5 ft 5 1/2 in)
- Billed weight: 92 kg (203 lb)
- Billed from: Mexico City, Mexico
- Trained by: Arkangel de la Muerte; Brazo Cibernético; El Hijo del Gladiador; Franco Columbo; Shocker; Último Guerrero
- Debut: 2005

Robin Ivan Alvarado Dominguez, known under the ring-name Robin, is a Mexican professional wrestler. He works for the Mexican professional wrestling promotion Consejo Mundial de Lucha Libre (CMLL) and portrays a tecnico ("Good guy") wrestling character. He is a part of the extensive Alvarado wrestling family, the son of José Aarón Alvarado Nieves who wrestled as "Brazo Cibernético" and "Robin Hood", and grandson of Juan Alvarado Ibarra, better known as Shadito Cruz.

== Professional wrestling career ==
He started his wrestling career by using the ring name Robin Hood Jr., after his deceased father José Aarón Alvarado Nieves who wrestled as "Robin Hood" for the major part of his wrestling career. He worked primarily on the Mexican independent circuit, including some shows for the Los Perros del Mal wrestling promotion.

=== Robin (2010–present) ===
He began working for Consejo Mundial de Lucha Libre (CMLL), one of Mexico's largest and the world's oldest wrestling promotion, in 2010 not long after his father José Alvarado Nieves (also known as "Brazo de Plata") made his return to the promotion. In CMLL he shortened his name to simply "Robin" and it was publicly acknowledged that he was the son of José Alvarado. As Robin he generally competed in the first or second match of the night while gaining in-ring experience. While working for CMLL the promotion allows their wrestlers to appear on pre-approved independently promoted shows around Mexico, which has allowed Robin to team with several of his family members, often working in Trios matches with his uncle Brazo de Platino or cousins La Mascara, Brazo de Platino Jr., El Brazo Jr., and Super Brazo Jr. The Alvarado family was particularly active in the Acapulco, Guerrero region where Robin challenged for the Guerrero State Light Heavyweight title, but lost. He also worked a series of shows for Toryumon Mexico, one of CMLL's affiliated promotions. He participated in the 2010 "Young Dragons Cup" torneo cibernetico (multi-man elimination match) but was eliminated mid-way through the match that was won by Angelico and Trauma I. Two years later he participated in Toryumon's 15th Torneo Copa Dragon (honoring Toryumon founder Último Dragón) but lost to Magnus and Tauro. He participated in a special Battle Royal commemorating the 25th anniversary of Arkangel de la Muerte along with a number of other Arkangel students. The Battle Royal was won by Starman. CMLL held a 16-man tournament focusing primarily on rookies called Torneo Sangre Nueva ("The New Blood Tournament") in March 2012, in which Robin participated. The second block competed on March 13, 2012, where Disturbio, Hombre Bala Jr., Raziel, and Tritón teamed up to face Robin, Bronco, Hijo del Signo, and Super Halcón Jr.; Raziel took the victory, and moved on to the finals. On February 17, 2013, Robin was one of multiple Alvarado family members to compete on the Homenaje a Shadito Cruz ("Homage to Shadito Cruz") show. He was part of a La Copa Junior torneo cibernetico match that was won by Brazo Celestial, either a younger brother or a younger cousin of Robin. In March 2013 Robin was one of 18 wrestlers who competed in the 2013 Torneo Sangre Nueva. He competed in qualifying block B on March 5, 2013, for a place in the finals; they competed in a torneo cibernetico, a multi-man elimination match, in which Robin was the fourth man eliminated over all when he was pinned by Guerrero Negro Jr. and did not eliminate anyone himself. In April 2013 Robin was announced as one of the Novatos, or rookies, in the 2013 Torneo Gran Alternativa, or "Great Alternative tournament". The Gran Alternativa pairs a rookie with an experienced wrestler for a tag team tournament and teamed Robin with his brother Máximo. The two competed in Block A on April 12, 2013 losing to Disturbio and Volador Jr. in the first round.

On May 19, 2017 footage of Robin and other members of the Alvarado family, including his brother José (Máximo Sexy) and cousins Psycho Clown and Felipe Alvarado (La Máscara), as well as his uncle Daniel Alvarado (Brazo de Platino), destroying an expensive car belonging to José Gutiérrez, better known as Último Guerrero. The vandalism was reportedly motivated by the fact that Gutiérrez had spoken out against Felipe Alvarado as a possible the head of the wrestler's union after the death of Alvarado's father. The head of the CMLL wrestlers' union had been in the Avarado family for over a decade and the Alvarado family believed it should go to someone in their family. The following day CMLL reportedly fired both Felipe and José Alvarado but did not confirm if they also fired Robin.

Robin was announced as a member of the returning Sin Salida apuestas cage match. He lasted until the end against Calavera Jr. I, losing to him. After hugging with his family, he retired his mask.

== The Alvarado wrestling family ==
Robin is part of a very large family of professional wrestlers who are descendants of Shadito Cruz; most use or have used a variation of the name "Brazo" ("Arm") in their ring name. Robin's father is José Aarón Alvarado Nieves, who wrestles as "Brazo Cibernético" and "Robin Hood". He is the nephew of Jesús Alvarado Nieves (Brazo de Oro), Juan Alvarado Nieves (El Brazo), Martín Antonio Alvarado Nieves (Super Brazo), and Daniel Alvarado Nieves (Brazo de Platino). Several of Robin's cousins are professional wrestlers as well, including Maximo, Psycho Clown (who used to wrestle as Brazo de Plata Jr.), Andros de Plata, La Máscara, El Brazo Jr., and Super Brazo Jr., and female wrestlers Danah and Goya Kong.

† = deceased

Shadito Cruz †	Ana Nieves †
Lady Apache	Brazo de Oro †	El Brazo †	Brazo de Plata	Brazo Cibernético †	Brazo de Platino	Super Brazo	La Alimaña
Aramís	La Máscara	El Brazo Jr.	Máximo	Robin	Super Brazo Jr.
Psycho Clown	India Sioux	Brazo Cibernético II
Carta Brava Jr.	Goya Kong
Danah

== Championships and accomplishments ==
- Consejo Mundial de Lucha Libre
  - CMLL Arena Coliseo Tag Team Championship - with Hombre Bala Jr.
- Coordinadora de Lucha Libre de Morelos
  - CLLM Omega Championship

== Luchas de Apuestas record ==
Winner (wager)	Loser (wager)	Location	Event	Date	Notes
Calavera Jr. I (mask)	Robin (mask)	Arena Mexico, Mexico City	Sin Salida	January 2, 2026	
