= Máximo (wrestler) =

Mexican professional wrestler (born 1980)

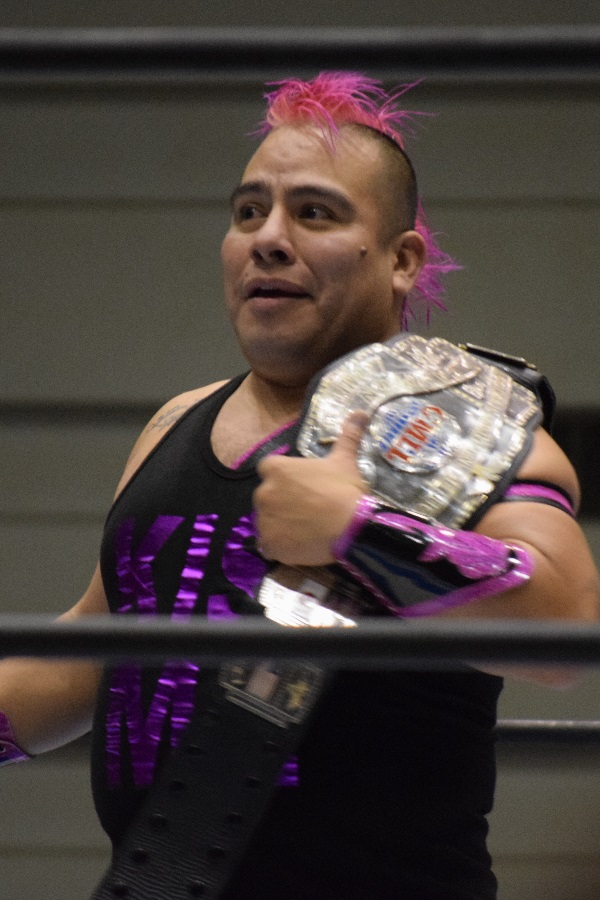
- Máximo as the CMLL World Heavyweight Champion in January 2017

Personal information
- Born: José Christian Alvarado Ruiz; November 8, 1980 (age 45) Mexico City, Mexico

Professional wrestling career
- Ring names: Brazo de Platino Jr.; Brazo Jr.; Corazon de Dragon; Máximo; Pepe Rous; Máximo Sexy; Máximo Ken
- Billed height: 1.70 m (5 ft 7 in)
- Billed weight: 92 kg (203 lb)
- Trained by: Shadito Cruz; Brazo de Plata; El Hijo del Gladiador; Shocker; Memo Díaz; Franco Columbo
- Debut: April 2, 2000

José Christian Alvarado Ruiz (born November 8, 1980) is a Mexican professional wrestler, better known by Máximo (Spanish for "Maximus").

Maximo while working for the Mexican professional wrestling promotion Consejo Mundial de Lucha Libre (CMLL) as Máximo Sexy until May 2017. Alvarado is the son of José Alvarado Nieves, who wrestled as Brazo de Plata (Spanish for "Silver Arm"), the grandson of Shadito Cruz and part of the extended Alvarado wrestling family. Alvarado wrestles as an exótico character, a character that appears to be homosexual but he is married to wrestler India Sioux and together they have a son.

== Early life ==
José Christian Alvarado Ruiz was born on November 8, 1980, son of professional wrestler José Alvarado Nieves (Brazo de Plata), into an extended family of wrestlers. The young José Christian grew up watching his father and his uncles wrestle all over Mexico and wanted nothing more than become a professional wrestler himself. He was trained for his professional wrestling debut by his grandfather Shadito Cruz and his father Brazo de Plata. He would later on receive further training by El Hijo del Gladiador, Shocker, Memo Díaz and Franco Columbo.

== Professional wrestling career ==
Alvarado made his professional wrestling debut in April, 2000 under the ring name Corazon de Dragón ("Dragonheart") and later worked as Pepe Rous. After gaining a bit of experience he took the name "Brazo Jr." – since his younger brother was wrestling as Brazo de Plata Jr. he played a character that was supposed to be the son of El Brazo. The two sons of Brazo de Plata teamed up with the son of Brazo de Oro who wrestled as Brazo de Oro Jr. to form the next generation of "Los Brazos". After a few months Alvarado changed his name from Brazo Jr. to Brazo de Platino Jr. primarily because El Brazo's own son was training to become a wrestler himself.

=== Consejo Mundial de Lucha Libre (2003–2017) ===
The Junior Brazos began working for Consejo Mundial de Lucha Libre (CMLL) in 2003 before the Alvarez family decided that their sons should create characters of their own instead of being the "Junior Brazos". Brazo de Oro Jr. became La Máscara, Brazo de Plata Jr. became Kronos (and later "Psycho Clown" in AAA's Los Psycho Circus).

José Christian Alvarado was repackaged as Máximo ("Maximus"), a character inspired by the Roman era and was supposed to team up with Los Romanos (Caligula and Mesalla) but instead he was turned into an Exótico character, a character that skirts the gender definitions and appears to be more homosexual than heterosexual. Máximo retained the "toga" look that came from his original idea but turned to pinks and purple colors to boost the Exótico image. CMLL did not have any other Exótico characters at the time, making Máximo stand out. On October 7, 2005, Máximo won his first professional wrestling championship when he teamed up with El Sagrado and El Texano Jr. to defeat Pandilla Guerrera (Spanish for "Gang of Warriors"; Sangre Azteca, Doctor X and Nitro) to win the Mexican National Trios Championship. Over the next 569 days Texano Jr., Sagrado and Máximo defended the Trios title against teams such as Danger, Infierno, Magnum; deposed champions Doctor X, Nitro, Sangre Azteca and the team of Arkangel, Doctor X and Misterioso II. On April 29, 2007, the team lost the Mexican National Trios Title to the Los Perros del Mal ("The Evil Dogs") faction of Mr. Águila, Damián 666 and Halloween. The title change was facilitated by El Texano Jr. turning on his partners mid-match, giving Los Perros an easy victory. Not long after turning Rudo (the Lucha Libre term for heel, or villain) Texano Jr. joined Los Perros del Mal and began a long-running, on again, off again, feud with Máximo. The storyline between Máximo and El Texano Jr. finally ended on March 15, 2009, almost two years after it began, when Texano Jr. defeated Máximo in two straight falls in a Lucha de Apuesta match, forcing Máximo to have all his hair shaved off after the match.

Following the match Máximo stated that he was going to leave CMLL and become a freelance wrestler, stating that he was not happy that CMLL's booking team was "too focused on a single wrestler". After the interview the CMLL Booking team and Máximo came to an agreement as he returned to CMLL only a short time later. In the fall of 2009 Máximo began a feud with Japanese wrestler Okumura as part of a longer running "Mexico vs. Japan" storyline. Okumura and Máximo faced off several times, usually as part of trios matches and each time the tension between the two wrestlers built. On November 5, 2009, the two faced off in a Lucha de Apuesta match, which saw Okumura win his first ever Apuesta, leaving Máximo bald in the process. The same year, Máximo wrestled in Japan for the Último Dragón Lucha Fiesta, facing and later teaming with Otoko Sakari in tag team matches. They faced twice Los Salseros Japoneses (Takeshi Minamino & Mango Fukuda), but were defeated.

In early 2010 Máximo was entered in the first ever Torneo Nacional de Parejas Increibles tournament, a tournament where CMLL teams up a Tecnico and a Rudo for a tournament where the teams represent the region they trained in. Máximo teamed up with Mr. Niebla, forming a team that was quickly nicknamed La Peste con Amour ("the Love Plague") born from Mr. Niebla being part of La Peste Negra ("the Black Plague") and Máximo's Exótico ring character. In the first round Niebla and Máximo defeated the team of Blue Panther and Misterioso II. La Peste con Amour won when Máximo kissed Panther, distracting him long enough for Mr. Niebla to sneak up behind him to roll him up for the pinfall. In the second round the team faced Atlantis and Máscara Dorada but were defeated when Máximo tried to kiss Atlantis to distract him, but ended up kissing Mr. Niebla instead, making him susceptible to a roll-up and pinfall. Following their exit from the Parejas Incredibles tournament Máximo and Mr. Niebla continued to team up blending both of their comedic styles together for a very entertaining team. La Peste con Amour stopped teaming in mid-March when Mr. Niebla reportedly suffered a knee injury. In late May, 2010 Máximo began a feud with Taichi, centered around Taichi's distaste over Máximo's homosexual ring character. The tension rose when Máximo kissed Taichi during a match, resulting in Taichi retaliating by kicking Máximo in the groin. The two met in a Lucha de Apuesta, hair vs. hair match on June 6, 2010, in the main event of CMLL's 2010 Sin Salida show, which Máximo won two falls to one.

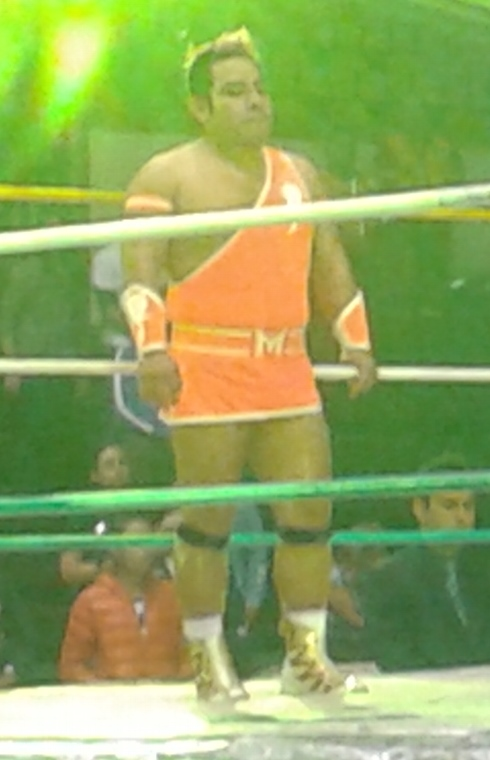
Máximo in May 2013

In January 2011, Máximo took part in the Fantastica Mania 2011 weekend, co-produced by CMLL and New Japan Pro-Wrestling in Tokyo. On January 22, Máximo was defeated by old rival Taichi in a singles match. The following day, he teamed with Danshoku Dino in a tag team match, where they were defeated by Gedo and Jado. In December 2011, Máximo formed the trio El Bufete del Amor with Marco Corleone and Rush. On January 21, 2012, Máximo returned to Japan to take part in Fantastica Mania 2012, teaming with Danshoku Dino on night one in a tag team match, where they were defeated by Suzuki-gun (Taichi and Taka Michinoku). The following day, Máximo picked up his first win in Japan, when he and Jushin Thunder Liger defeated Taichi and Misterioso Jr. in a tag team match. Back in Mexico, El Bufete del Amor defeated Los Hijos del Averno (Averno, Ephesto and Mephisto) on February 19 to win the CMLL World Trios Championship. Máximo returned to Japan on July 7 for a two-week-long tour with New Japan Pro-Wrestling. In January 2013, Máximo returned to Japan to take part in the three-day Fantastica Mania 2013 event. During the first night on January 18, he teamed with La Máscara and Mascara Dorada in a six-man tag team match, where they were defeated by Taichi, Taka Michinoku and Volador Jr. The following night, Máximo and Tama Tonga defeated Taichi and Michinoku in a tag team match. During the third and final night, Máximo was defeated by Taichi in a singles match. In the fall of 2012 El Bufete began a feud against the Mexican National Trios Champions Los Invasores (Volador Jr., Mr. Águila and Kraneo). The two teams fought several occasions with El Bufete's CMLL World Trios Championship on the line, while Los Invasores Mexican National Trios Championship being passed over compared to the more prestigious CMLL title. Máximo was forced to team up with Mr. Águila for the 2013 Torneo Nacional de Parejas Increibles ("National Incredible Pairs Tournament"), a tag team tournament teaming up wrestlers who would never team up otherwise, often because they are rivals, would be forced to work together. Máximo and Mr. Águila lost to the team of Máscara Dorada and Mephisto even though they were able to put their differences aside for one night. On April 19, Máximo started another tour with New Japan Pro-Wrestling. In May, Máximo, Marco Corleone and Rush were stripped of the CMLL World Trios Championship, when Corleone was sidelined with a knee injury. In January 2014, Máximo returned to Japan to take part in the five-day Fantastica Mania 2014 tour. During the third event of the tour, on January 17, Máximo unsuccessfully challenged Rey Escorpión for the CMLL World Light Heavyweight Championship. On October 3, 2014, Máximo participated in the 2014 La Copa Junior VIP tournament, qualifying for the finals by defeating Puma, Stuka Jr. and then finally La Sombra (by disqualification) to qualify for the finals. On October 10, Maximo defeated Mephisto to win his first ever La Copa Junior.

On January 30, 2015, Máximo defeated El Terrible to win the CMLL World Heavyweight Championship. The win made Máximo and his father Brazo de Plata the first father and son to hold the same world heavyweight championship of a major company. On March 6, Máximo and El Terrible won the 2015 Torneo Nacional de Parejas Increibles. On May 9, 2015, Maximo had his first defense against Rey Bucanero. On July 14, 2015, Maximo had his second defense against Rey Escorpión. On July 27, 2015, Maximo had his third defense against Euforia. During his reign, in October 2015, Máximo changed his ringame to Máximo Sexy. In January 2017, Máximo Sexy took part in the Fantastica Mania 2017 tour, successfully defending the CMLL World Heavyweight Championship against Hechicero during the January 21 event.

=== Fired from CMLL ===
On May 19, 2017, footage emerged of José Alvarado and other members of the Alvarado family, including his brother Psycho Clown and cousins Felipe (La Máscara) and Robin, as well as his uncle Daniel Alvarado (Brazo de Platino), destroying an expensive car belonging to José Gutiérrez, better known as Último Guerrero. The vandalism was reportedly motivated by the fact that Gutiérrez had spoken out against Felipe Alvarado as the possible head of the wrestler's union after the death of Alvarado's father. The head of the CMLL wrestlers' union had been in the Avarado family for over a decade and the Alvarado family believed it should go to someone in their family. On May 22, CMLL publicly fired both Felipe and José Alvarado, stripping them both of their championships in the process.

=== The Crash (2017–2018) ===
On May 30, 2017, Máximo (as Máximo Ken) and La Máscara made a surprise appearance for Tijuana-based lucha libre promotion The Crash. The duo attacked Garza Jr. and Daga, and started a storyline feud with Penta el 0M and Rey Fénix. The cousins were originally announced as being booked to wrestle against L.A. Park and Dr. Wagner Jr. in the main event of a Lucha Libre Boom! show, but it was later announced that the match had been changed to L.A. Park vs. Dr. Wagner Jr. as Lucha Libre AAA Worldwide (AAA) did not want wrestlers under contract with AAA (Wagner) to work with La Máscara and Máximo at the moment.

=== Lucha Libre AAA Worldwide (2018–2021) ===
On January 26, Máximo along with La Máscara made their debut in Guerra de Titanes to help his brother Psycho Clown and thus forming his team called, Los Mosqueteros del Diablo ("The Musketeers of the Devil").

On July 13, 2021, Máximo was announcing Alberto El Patron's "Hecho en Mexico" event, announcing his departure from AAA.

=== Impact Wrestling (2018) ===
Máximo made a special appearance on the October 11, 2018, edition of IMPACT Wrestling, which was taped September 13–14, 2018 at Mexico City's Frontón México Entertainment Center, defeating Grado with schoolboy roll-up after having momentarily stunned the latter with a kiss. After the match, Grado kissed Máximo and left the ring.

== The Alvarado wrestling family ==
José Christian Alvarado is part of a very large family of professional wrestlers all descendants of Shadito Cruz, most of whom use or have used a variation of the name "Brazo" ("Arm") in their ring name. José Christian's father is José Alvarado Nieves, who wrestles as "Brazo de Plata" and he is the brother of wrestlers Psycho Clown (who used to wrestle as Brazo de Plata Jr.), Brazo de Plata Jr., Brazo Metallico and female wrestlers Muñeca de Plata and Goya Kong. He is the nephew of Jesús Alvarado Nieves (Brazo de Oro), Juan Alvarado Nieves (El Brazo), José Aarón Alvarado Nieves (Brazo Cibernetico), Martín Antonio Alvarado Nieves (Super Brazo) and Daniel Alvarado Nieves (Brazo de Platino). Several of José Christian's cousins are professional wrestlers as well including La Máscara, El Brazo Jr., Super Brazo Jr., Robin and Andrea Alvarado.

José Christian Alvarado is married to professional wrestler India Sioux and together they have a son (born August 18, 2009). India Sioux had to retire from wrestling for them to get pregnant and has not yet returned to the ring after giving birth though a Caesarean section. Alvarado has stated that "Being a father is harder than being a wrestler". India Sioux also comes from a wrestling family, including her father Hombre Bala, her brothers Hombre Bala Jr. and Corsario Jr., and her uncles Pirata Morgan, Verdugo and La Marquesa. She's the cousin of Pirata Morgan Jr., Hijo de Pirata Morgan, Barba Roja, Perla Negra and Rey Bucanero.

† = deceased

Shadito Cruz †	Ana Nieves †
Lady Apache	Brazo de Oro †	El Brazo †	Brazo de Plata †	Brazo Cibernético †	Brazo de Platino	Super Brazo	La Alimaña
Aramís	La Máscara	El Brazo Jr.	Máximo	Robin	Super Brazo Jr.
Psycho Clown	India Sioux	Brazo Cibernético II
Carta Brava Jr.	Goya Kong
Danah

== Championships and accomplishments ==
- Consejo Mundial de Lucha Libre
  - CMLL World Heavyweight Championship (1 time)
  - CMLL World Trios Championship (1 time) – with Marco Corleone and Rush
  - Mexican National Trios Championship (1 time) – with El Sagrado and El Texano Jr.
  - La Copa Junior (2014 VIP)
  - Torneo Nacional de Parejas Increibles (2015) – with El Terrible
- Pro Wrestling Illustrated
  - PWI ranked him #57 of the top 500 wrestlers in the PWI 500 in 2015
- Wrestling Martín Calderón
  - WAR City Exotico Championship (1 time)

== Luchas de Apuestas record ==
Winner (wager)	Loser (wager)	Location	Event	Date	Notes
Máximo (hair)	Conde 2000 (hair)	Pachuca, Hidalgo	Live event	July 5, 2005	
Máximo (hair)	César Dantés (hair)	Guadalajara, Jalisco	Live event	December 10, 2005	(Note: This was a steel cage match that also included Brazo de Oro, El Texano Jr., Máscara Mágica, Mazada, Okumura, El Terrible.)
Máximo (hair)	(hair) Destroyer	Acapulco, Guerrero	Live event	March 15, 2006	
Máximo (hair)	Sexy Piscis (hair)	Torreón, Coahuila	Live event	April 8, 2006	
Máximo (hair)	Loco Max (hair)	Mexico City	Live event	June 5, 2006	
Máximo (hair)	Mr. Mexico (hair)	Puebla, Puebla	Live event	August 8, 2006	
Máximo (hair)	Emilio Charles Jr. (hair)	Mexico City	Live event	October 29, 2006	
Máximo (hair)	Rambo (hair)	Querétaro, Querétaro	Live event	January 15, 2008	
Máximo (hair)	Police Man (hair)	Puebla, Puebla	Live event	August 11, 2008	
El Texano Jr. (hair)	Máximo (hair)	Guadalajara, Jalisco	Live event	March 15, 2009	
Okumura (hair)	Máximo (hair)	Mexico City	Live event	November 15, 2009	
Máximo (hair)	Taichi (hair)	Mexico City	Sin Salida	June 6, 2010	
El Texano Jr. and El Terrible (hair)	La Dinastia Alvarado (hair) (Brazo de Plata and Máximo)	Mexico City	Homenaje a Dos Leyendas	March 18, 2011	
Máximo and Volador Jr. (hair)	TRT: La Máquina de la Destrucción (hair) (El Terrible and Rey Bucanero)	Mexico City	Homenaje a Dos Leyendas	March 20, 2015	
Máximo Sexy (hair)	Kamaitachi (hair)	Mexico City	Sin Piedad	January 1, 2016	
Rush (hair)	Máximo Sexy (hair)	Mexico City	Homenaje a Dos Leyendas	March 18, 2016	
Máximo Sexy (hair)	Máscara Año 2000 (hair)	Mexico City	Sin Piedad	January 1, 2017	
La Máscara (Goya Kong's hair)	Máximo (Brazo de Plata's hair)	Benito Juarez, Distrito Federal	AAA/Legends show	February 1, 2019	(Note: Each wrestler bet the hair of their second instead of their own.)

== See also ==
- List of exóticos
