= List of Universal Wrestling Association Shows =

Professional wrestling shows by Universal Wrestling Association

The Mexican professional wrestling promotion Universal Wrestling Association, which existed from 1975 until 1995 held a series of supercards over the years, including their annual "UWA Anniversary Show" that they held from 1976 until 1994 in late January or early February each year. Since the UWA operated before the pay-per-view (PPV) technology became readily available in Mexico the shows were normally taped for television broadcast.

== UWA Debut Show ==
UWA Debut Show
- Promotion: Universal Wrestling Association
- Date: January 26, 1975
- City: Mexico City, Mexico
- Venue: Palacio de los Deportes
- Attendance: Unknown

Event chronology
← Previous; First	Next → UWA 1st Anniversary Show

The Universal Wrestling Association (UWA) held their debut show on January 26, 1975, featuring a mixture of wrestlers who had joined the UWA founders from Empresa Mexicana de Lucha Libre (EMLL) and wrestlers from the independent circuit. In the main event Aníbal successfully defended the NWA World Middleweight Championship against former champion René Guajardo. Aníbal had taken the Middleweight championship belt with him when he left EMLL, but since the UWA were not members of the National Wrestling Alliance (NWA) Aníbal was stripped of the title after making an unsanctioned defense at UWA's debut show. The show featured five matches in total, including a Best two out of three falls Six-man tag team match featuring one of the UWA founders, Ray Mendoza, teaming up with two up-and-coming wrestlers Mil Mascaras and El Solitario, both of whom would go on to have long distinguished careers. They faced the team of veteran Dory Dixon who had joined the UWA to attain one last run in the main event, teaming with North American wrestler Sunny War Cloud and the man who would later become synonymous with the UWA, El Canek. Mendoza, Máscaras and Solitario won the match in three falls. The undercard featured several other wrestlers who had been underutilized in EMLL but would go on to become famous for their work in the UWA: Rayo de Jalisco, Tinieblas, Dos Caras and Villano I.

No.	Results	Stipulations
1	Villano I defeated Atila	Singles match
2	Dos Caras defeated Renato Torres	Singles match
3	Rayo de Jalisco and Tinieblas defeated Cesar Valentino and El Vikingo	Tag team match
4	Mil Máscaras, Ray Mendoza and El Solitario defeated Dory Dixon, El Canek and Sunny War Cloud	Best two out of three falls Six-man tag team match
5	Aníbal (c) defeated René Guajardo	Singles match for the NWA World Middleweight Championship
(c) / – the champion(s) heading into the match

== UWA 6th Anniversary Show ==
UWA 6th Anniversary Show
- Promotion: Universal Wrestling Association
- Date: February 8, 1981
- City: Naucalpan, Mexico State, Mexico
- Venue: El Toreo De Naucalpan

Event chronology
← Previous; UWA 6th Anniversary Show	Next → UWA 7th Anniversary Show

The Universal Wrestling Association 6th Anniversary Show (El Sexto Aniversario de Universal Wrestling Association in Spanish) was a supercard promoted by the Universal Wrestling Association (UWA) to commemorate sixth anniversary of their debut in 1975 and was held on February 8, 1981.

No.	Results	Stipulations
1	Perro Aguayo, Dr. Wagner and El Canek defeated Ángel Blanco, Fishman and Enrique Vera	Best two out of three falls Six-man tag team match
2	Chabela Romero (c) defeated Irma González	Best two-out-of-three falls match for the UWA World Women's Championship
3	El Solitario (c) vs. Villano III ended in a time limit draw	Best two-out-of-three falls match for the UWA World Light Heavyweight Championship
(c) / – the champion(s) heading into the match

== UWA 7th Anniversary Show ==
UWA 7th Anniversary Show
- Promotion: Universal Wrestling Association
- Date: February 14, 1982
- City: Naucalpan, Mexico State, Mexico
- Venue: El Toreo De Naucalpan
- Attendance: 18,000

Event chronology
← Previous; UWA 6th Anniversary Show	Next → UWA 8th Anniversary Show

The Universal Wrestling Association 7th Anniversary Show (El Séptimo Aniversario de Universal Wrestling Association in Spanish) was a supercard promoted by the Universal Wrestling Association (UWA) to commemorate seventh anniversary of their debut in 1975 and was held on February 14, 1982. The main event of the evening was a tag team match where UWA wrestler Perro Aguayo teamed up with Abdullah the Butcher, wrestling and defeating the Japanese team of Antonio Inoki and Tatsumi Fujinami, representing New Japan Pro-Wrestling, with whom the UWA had a long running working arrangement. The semi-main event saw El Canek successfully defend the UWA World Heavyweight Championship against Don Corleone. Also on the card Gran Hamada defeated Centurion Negro to win the UWA World Middleweight Championship. Wrestling legend and multiple time world champion Lou Thez served as the referee for both championship matches. In the opening match UWA's premiere rudo (bad guy) Trio, Los Misioneros de la Muerte (El Signo, Negro Navarro and El Texano) defeated NJPW representatives Kuniaki Kobayashi, Masa Saito and George Takano.

No.	Results	Stipulations	Times
1	Los Misionares de la Muerte (El Signo, Negro Navarro and El Texano) defeated Kuniaki Kobayashi, Masa Saito and George Takano	Best two out of three falls Six-man tag team match	—
2	Black Man, Enrique Vera and Mano Negra defeated Baby Face, El Scorpio and Rudy Reyna – two falls to one: First fall: Vera pinned Baby Face, Negra pinned Scorpio and Reyna was counted out (11:00); Second fall: Baby Face forced Vera to submit and Scorpio pinned Negro (16:00); Third fall: Baby Face, Scorpio and Reyna were counted out	Best two out of three falls Six-man tag team match	23:00
3	Gran Hamada defeated Centurion Negro (c) – two falls to one: First fall: Negro pinned Hamada; Second fall: Hamada pinned Negro; Third fall: Hamada pinned Negro	Best two out of three falls for the UWA World Middleweight Championship. Lou Thesz was the special referee	21:03
4	El Canek (c) defeated Don Corleone – two falls to one: First fall: El Canek pinned Corleone; Second fall: Corleone pinned El Canek; Third fall: El Canek pinned Corleone	Best two out of three falls for the UWA World Heavyweight Championship. Lou Thesz was the special referee.	23:52
5	Abdullah the Butcher and Perro Aguayo defeated Antonio Inoki and Tatsumi Fujinami – two falls to one: First fall: Fujinami pinned Aguayo and Abdullah was counted out; Second fall: Aguayo pinned Fujinami and Inoki was counted out; Third fall: Inoki and Fujinami were disqualified	Tag team match	17:35
(c) / – the champion(s) heading into the match

== UWA 9th Anniversary Show ==
UWA 9th Anniversary Show
- Promotion: Universal Wrestling Association
- Date: January 29, 1984
- City: Naucalpan, Mexico State, Mexico
- Venue: El Toreo De Naucalpan
- Attendance: 25,000

Event chronology
← Previous; UWA 8th Anniversary Show	Next → UWA 10th Anniversary Show

The Universal Wrestling Association 9th Anniversary Show (El Noveno Aniversario de Universal Wrestling Association in Spanish) was a supercard promoted by the Universal Wrestling Association (UWA) to commemorate seventh anniversary of their debut in 1975 and was held on January 29, 1984. The only confirmed match results found for the 9th Anniversary show was from the main event as El Canek defended the UWA World Heavyweight Championship against the French André the Giant in one of El Canek's most famous matches. El Canek successfully defended the championship, actually bodyslamming André the Giant during the match, a feat very few people have done through Andre's career.

No.	Results	Stipulations
1	El Canek (c) defeated André the Giant – two falls to one	Singles match for the UWA World Heavyweight Championship
(c) / – the champion(s) heading into the match

== UWA 14th Anniversary Show ==
UWA 14th Anniversary Show
- Promotion: Universal Wrestling Association
- Date: January 29, 1989
- City: Naucalpan, Mexico State, Mexico
- Venue: El Toreo De Naucalpan
- Attendance: 18,000

Event chronology
← Previous; UWA 13th Anniversary Show	Next → UWA 15th Anniversary Show

The Universal Wrestling Association 14th Anniversary Show (El Decimocuarto Aniversario de Universal Wrestling Association in Spanish) was a supercard promoted by the Universal Wrestling Association (UWA) to commemorate seventh anniversary of their debut in 1975 and was held on January 29, 1989. This event, like all other Anniversary shows took place at El Toreo De Naucalpan bullfighting arena, the UWA's "home arena". The main event was a high-profile UWA World Heavyweight Championship match where champion El Canek successfully defended against one of Consejo Mundial de Lucha Libre (CMLL)'s most popular heavyweights Konnan. The show also featured a young Japanese wrestler by the name of Yoshihiro Asai, a man who would later become known as Último Dragón, a name he adopted while wrestling in Mexico.

No.	Results	Stipulations
1	El Halcón and El Falcón defeated El Canalla and Rocky Santana].	Tag team match
2	Ricky Boy, Espanto Jr. and Negro Casas defeated Black Man, Kung Fu and Yoshihiro Asai	Best two out of three falls Six-man tag team match
3	El Texano, El Fantasma and Drago defeated Ángel Blanco, Jr., Black Power II and El Indómito	Best two out of three falls Six-man tag team match
4	Gran Hamada, Perro Aguayo, Dos Caras and Villano III defeated Fishman, Kahoz, Zandokan and Rambo	Best two out of three falls Six-man tag team match
5	El Signo defeated Kato Kung Lee	Lucha de Apuesta, hair vs. hair match
6	El Canek (c) defeated Konnan	Singles match for the UWA World Heavyweight Championship
(c) / – the champion(s) heading into the match

== UWA 16th Anniversary Show ==
UWA 16th Anniversary Show
- Promotion: Universal Wrestling Association
- Date: January 27, 1991
- City: Naucalpan, Mexico State, Mexico
- Venue: El Toreo De Naucalpan
- Attendance: 16,000

Event chronology
← Previous; UWA 15th Anniversary Show	Next → UWA 17th Anniversary Show

The Universal Wrestling Association 16th Anniversary Show (El Decimosexto Aniversario de Universal Wrestling Association in Spanish) was a supercard promoted by the Universal Wrestling Association (UWA) to commemorate seventh anniversary of their debut in 1975 and was held on January 27, 1991. This event, like all other Anniversary shows took place at El Toreo De Naucalpan bullfighting arena, the UWA's "home arena". In the main event UWA's most popular wrestlers, Mil Mascaras, Dos Caras and El Canek, defeated a team called The Hawaiian Beasts, consisting of Samoans Fatu, Kokina (Later known as Yokozuna) and Nikozuna (also known as the Samoan Savage).

No.	Results	Stipulations
1	Los Cowboys (Silver King and El Texano) and El Fantasma defeated El Scorpio, Black Power and Kahoz	Best two out of three falls Six-man tag team match
2	Baby Face, El Signo and El Engendro defeated Los Villanos (Villano I, Villano IV and Villano V) – two falls to none	Best two out of three falls Six-man tag team match
3	El Hijo del Santo, Villano III and Enrique Vera defeated Negro Casas, Fishman and Killer	Best two out of three falls Six-man tag team match
4	Mil Mascaras, Dos Caras and El Canek defeated The Hawaiian Beasts (Fatu, Kokina and Nikozuna)	Best two out of three falls Six-man tag team match

== UWA 17th Anniversary Show ==
UWA 17th Anniversary Show
- Promotion: Universal Wrestling Association
- Date: January 26, 1992
- City: Naucalpan, Mexico State, Mexico
- Venue: El Toreo De Naucalpan
- Attendance: 18,000

Event chronology
← Previous; UWA 16th Anniversary Show	Next → UWA 18th Anniversary Show

The Universal Wrestling Association 17th Anniversary Show (El Decimoséptimo Aniversario de Universal Wrestling Association in Spanish) was a supercard promoted by the Universal Wrestling Association (UWA) to commemorate seventh anniversary of their debut in 1975 and was held on January 26, 1992. This event, like all other Anniversary shows took place at El Toreo De Naucalpan bullfighting arena, the UWA's "home arena". The main event was a high-profile WWF World Light Heavyweight Championship defense with champion Chris Benoit defeating UWA's top Mexican Light Heavyweight Villano III in a match that went over 42 minutes of non-stop action.

The fifth match of the night featured the rivalry between El Hijo del Santo and Negro Casas, a rivalry that would continue for years, even after both wrestlers joined Consejo Mundial de Lucha Libre (CMLL). On the night Hijo del Santo teamed up with Dos Caras and Gran Hamada to defeat Casas, El Canek and Fishman. The show also had appearances of Buffalo Allen, Kokina, better known as "Bad News" Brown and Yokozuna in the World Wrestling Federation (WWF). In the third match Villano I made his last anniversary show appearance as he teamed with his brothers Villano IV and Villano V to defeat Baby Face, Killer and Canadian Tiger.

No.	Results	Stipulations	Times
1	Lasser and Kendo defeated Los Mohicanos (Mohicano I and Mohicano II)	Tag team match	—
2	Los Misioneros de la Muerte (El Signo, Black Power and Negro Navarro) defeated Super Ratón, Super Pinocchio and Valente Fernandez	Best two out of three falls Six-man tag team match	—
3	Los Villanos (Villano I, Villano IV and Villano V) defeated Baby Face, Killer and Canadian Tiger	Best two out of three falls Six-man tag team match	—
4	Buffalo Allen, Kokina and Gigante Warrior defeated El Fantasma, Enrique Vera and Tomba the Flying Elephant	Best two out of three falls Six-man tag team match	—
5	Dos Caras, Gran Hamada and El Hijo del Santo defeated El Canek, Fishman and Negro Casas – two falls to one	Best two out of three falls Six-man tag team match	—
6	Pegasus Kid (c) defeated Villano III – two falls to one	Singles match for the WWF World Light Heavyweight Championship	42:10
(c) / – the champion(s) heading into the match

== UWA 18th Anniversary Show ==
UWA 18th Anniversary Show
- Promotion: Universal Wrestling Association
- Date: January 31, 1993
- City: Naucalpan, Mexico State, Mexico
- Venue: El Toreo De Naucalpan

Event chronology
← Previous; UWA 17th Anniversary Show	Next → UWA 19th Anniversary Show

The Universal Wrestling Association 18th Anniversary Show (El Decimoctavo Aniversario de Universal Wrestling Association in Spanish) was a supercard promoted by the Universal Wrestling Association (UWA) to commemorate seventh anniversary of their debut in 1975 and was held on January 31, 1993. This event, like all other Anniversary shows took place at El Toreo De Naucalpan bullfighting arena, the UWA's "home arena". In the main event Vampiro defeated El Canek to win the UWA World Heavyweight Championship. This ended Canek's 11th, of an eventual 15, title reign. In the semi-main event foreigners Crash the Terminator, Eddie Watts and Goliath el Gigante UWA's Mexican representatives Dos Caras and Los Cowboys (El Texano and Silver King). Further down the card Los Misioneros de la Muerte (El Signo, Negro Navarro and Black Power II) retained the UWA World Trios Championship when they wrestled to a time limit draw against challengers Dr. Wagner, Jr., Scorpio, Jr. and Shu el Guerrero.

No.	Results	Stipulations
1	Sato and El Sagrado defeated Titere and Rey Richard	Tag team match
2	The King and Los Villanos (Villano I and Villano V) defeated El Rudo, Kennich and Karloff Lagarde, Jr.	Best two out of three falls Six-man tag team match
3	Kato Kung Lee, Villano IV and Enrique Vera defeated Killer, El Scorpio and El Engendro	Best two out of three falls Six-man tag team match
4	Los Misioneros de la Muerte (El Signo, Negro Navarro and Black Power II) (c) vs. Dr. Wagner, Jr., Scorpio, Jr. and Shu el Guerrero ended in a draw	Best two out of three falls Six-man tag team match for the UWA World Trios Championship
5	Crash the Terminator, Eddie Watts and Goliath el Gigante defeated Dos Caras and Los Cowboys (El Texano and Silver King)	Best two out of three falls Six-man tag team match
6	Vampiro defeated El Canek (c)	Singles match for the UWA World Heavyweight Championship
(c) / – the champion(s) heading into the match

== UWA 19th Anniversary Show ==
UWA 19th Anniversary Show
- Promotion: Universal Wrestling Association
- Date: January 30, 1994
- City: Naucalpan, Mexico State, Mexico
- Venue: El Toreo De Naucalpan

Event chronology
← Previous; UWA 18th Anniversary Show	Next → Last

The Universal Wrestling Association 19th Anniversary Show (El Decimonoveno Aniversario de Universal Wrestling Association in Spanish) was a supercard promoted by the Universal Wrestling Association (UWA) to commemorate seventh anniversary of their debut in 1975 and was held on January 30, 1994. This event, like all other Anniversary shows took place at El Toreo De Naucalpan bullfighting arena, the UWA's "home arena". The 19th Anniversary Show was the last anniversary show promoted by the UWA as it closed its doors in February, 1995, less than a month after its 20th anniversary. El Canek was the only wrestler who worked on the 19th anniversary show that also wrestled on the UWA's Debut show. Canek teamed up with Gran Hamada and Transformer in the main event, losing to the team of Yamato and Los Villanos (Villano III and Villano V, sons of UWA founder Ray Mendoza). In the semi-main event Karloff Lagarde, Jr. defeated Celestial to win the UWA World Welterweight Championship. The opening match was a rare appearance of Mini-Estrellas in the UWA as their popularity had only reemerged in the early 1990s, UWA brought in Fuercita Guerrera and teamed him up with Mini-Estrella legend Pequeño Goliath who defeated Pequeño Chucky and Micro Konnan.

No.	Results	Stipulations
1	Fuercita Guerrera and Pequeño Goliath defeated Pequeño Chucky and Micro Konnan	Tag team match
2	Blackman II and Shogun defeated Lobo Rubio and Bad Boy I	Tag team match
3	Luis Mariscal, Adrian el Exótico and Pimpinela Escarlata vs. Super Ratón, Super Pinocchio and Nuevo Audaz ended in a draw	Best two out of three falls Six-man tag team match
4	Super Astro, King I and Halcon Dorado Jr. defeated Shu el Guerrero, Villano IV and Black Power II by disqualification	Best two out of three falls Six-man tag team match
5	Karloff Lagarde, Jr. defeated Celestial (c)	Singles match for the UWA World Welterweight Championship
6	Yamato and Los Villanos (Villano III and Villano V) defeated El Canek, Gran Hamada and Transformer	Best two out of three falls Six-man tag team match
(c) / – the champion(s) heading into the match
