= El Signo =

Mexican professional wrestler

Personal information
- Born: Antonio Sánchez Rendón; September 4, 1954 Ocotlán de Morelos, Oaxaca, Mexico
- Died: 5 June 2024 (aged 69)

Professional wrestling career
- Ring name(s): El Signo; Piromaniaco
- Billed height: 1.72 m (5 ft 7 1/2 in)
- Billed weight: 98 kg (216 lb)
- Trained by: Billy Robinson; Chamaco Azteca; El Carnicero
- Debut: September 16, 1971
- Retired: March 17, 2013

Antonio Sánchez Rendón (born September 4, 1954 — June 6, 2024) was a Mexican professional wrestler, best known under the ring name El Signo (Spanish for "The Symbol"). Rendón was part of Los Misioneros de la Muerte ("The Missionaries of Death") with Negro Navarro and El Texano a team that is credited with popularizing the Trios match in Mexico to the point that it became one of the most common match in various professional wrestling promotions. Sánchez made his professional wrestling debut in 1971 and officially retired in 2010, after 38 years of active competition. At least one of Sánchez's children is also a professional wrestler, working under the name Hijo del Signo ("Son of the Sign", born 1985) since 2008.

== Personal life ==
Most wrestlers in Mexico try to maintain a separation between their professional career and their personal life, which is also true of Antonio Sánchez Rendón, confirming only the most basic details of his life such as birth age and location etc. He was born on September 4, 1954, in Ocotlán de Morelos, Oaxaca, Mexico, and trained for his professional wrestling career under Billy Robinson, Chamaco Azteca and El Carnicero. Sánchez has at least one child, a son born in 1985 who now wrestled as the masked character Hijo del Signo, but since he is an enmascarado his birth name is not reported on out of respect of lucha libre (the professional wrestling style originary from Mexico) traditions. It is not documented if he has other children or if he was still married to the mother of Hijo del Signo.

== Professional wrestling career ==
Sánchez made his professional wrestling debut on September 16, 1971, a few weeks after turning 17 years old. He began wrestling as the enmascarado character "El Signo" ("The Sign"), wearing a mask (most often black) with an upside down question mark on the front of it. Sánchez started his wrestling career in the lighter weight divisions, often in the Lightweight or Welterweight divisions, where the official limits were around 70 kg (150 lb) and 78 kg (172 lb). In 1974 El Signo lost a Luchas de Apuestas, or bet match to Gatúbedo and as a result was forced to unmask and reveal his birth name as per Lucha Libre traditions. While he had unmasked he retained the ring name El Signo and began working for the Universal Wrestling Association (UWA), one of two major wrestling promotions in Mexico (the other being Empresa Mexicana de Lucha Libre (EMLL)). In the UWA he defeated El Matemático to win the UWA World Lightweight Championship, his first championship ever. During that time period he formed a regular tag team with Lobo Rubio, and the two hand an extended storyline feud with the team of El Matemático and Black Man that started with the UWA title match and came to an end on January 29, 1978, when Signo and Lobo Rubio lost a tag team Luchas de Apuestas match and both were forced to be shaved bald as a result. In late 1978 El Signo vacated the UWA World Lightweight Championship for unexplained reasons, although the most likely being that he moved up into the Welterweight division and was too heavy to be considered a Lightweight. On June 24, 1979, El Signo won the UWA World Welterweight Championship from Bobby Lee, fully establishing him as a Welterweight wrestler.

=== Los Misioneros de la Muerte ===
In the late 1970s the UWA promoters were noticing that rival EMLL had achieved financial and critical success with their lighter divisions, often having Lightweights or Welterweights in their main events while the UWA relied primarily on their heavyweight division for their main event matches. promoter Francisco Flores wanted to develop his own group of smaller, faster wrestlers into top level competitors and came up with the idea to team El Signo up with two similar sized wrestlers Miguel Calderón Navarro, known as Negro Navarro and Juan Conrado Aguilar Jáuregui, who was working under the name El Texano, forming a trie known as Los Misioneros de la Muerte ("The Missionaries of Death"). They were paired up against another trio of young, lightweight and high flying wrestlers, a trio of brothers dubbed Los Mosqueteros de Diablo (The Devil's Musketeers), Brazo de Oro ("Golden Hand"), Brazo de Plata ("Silver Arm") and El Brazo ("The Arm"). Early on in the storyline Brazo de Oro defeated El Texano in a Luchas de Apuestas, or bet match, which forced El Texano to unmask. The storyline expanded and saw the unmasked Misionaros clash with the masked Mosqueteros on UWA promoted cards all over Mexico. The fan reception to those matches and the positive coverage in various Lucha Libre magazines was so big that other promoters around Mexico wanted to book them on their shows, not as individuals but as teams, which was the start of the trios match becoming more and more prominent in Lucha Libre. With the team being so in demand UWA started to feature Los Misioneros more often that by 1981 Los Misioneros began working high on the card, often working the main event match starting a trend of having trios matches instead of singles matches as the regular main event match format, something that helped make that match format the most common match type in Lucha Libre since then.

In 1981 the Los Misioneros de la Muerte name became a household name after a match in El Toreo de Quatro Caminos, UWA's main venue. During the main event Los Misioneros faced off against then 64-year-old El Santo, who was teaming up with Huracán Ramírez and Rayo de Jalisco. During the match El Santo collapsed in the middle of the ring, suffering a heart attack after a hard blow to the chest. His life was only saved due to the actions of Ramírez who administered CPR at ringside. After the match the Lucha Libre magazine, prompted by Francisco Flores, played off the real life tragedy by promoting Los Misioneros as the team that nearly killed the biggest name in Lucha Libre ever. The event made the team the most hated trio in Mexico for years to come and helped fill El Torero arena to the brim when Los Misioneros teamed up with Perro Aguayo to face El Santo, Gory Guerrero, Huracán Ramírez and El Solitario in El Santo's retirement match. Following Santo's retirement Los Misioneros feuded with the top faces (wrestlers portraying "good guy" characters) such as Los Tres Caballero (Aníbal, El Solitario and Villano III) both in trios and in individual competition. During the storyline El Solitario turned on his two partners, when he attacked El Signo with a bottle and costing Los Tres Caballeros an important match. The attack made the smaller Los Misioneros more sympathetic to the crowd, who began to support them more and more despite Los Misioneros being booked on the shows as heel characters ("bad guys"). On June 10, 1983, El Signo won the UWA World Junior Light Heavyweight Championship from El Solitario as part of their long running storyline, marking the third division El Signo had won the UWA title in. He would later be stripped of the title for making an unsanctioned title defense on a non-UWA show. Their popularity as a trio also led to them being invited to tour Japan, facing off against New Japan Pro-Wrestling (NJPW) light weight wrestlers such as Gran Hamada, Tiger Mask, George Takano, Akira Maeda and Osamu Kido.

In 1984 Los Misioneros won the UWA World Trios Championship for the first time, although it is not documented for exactly how long. On January 1, 1985, Negro Navarro won his first singles championship, the UWA World Junior Light Heavyweight Championship, when he defeated the then champion Aníbal. The title run only lasted 50 days, ending on February 25, 1985, when he lost to Mano Negra. In the mid-1980s the "War" between the UWA and EMLL had cooled off enough for Los Misionerios to actually wrestle on the EMLL 53rd Anniversary Show, losing a trios Luchas de Apuestas to Ringo Mendoza, Américo Rocca and Tony Salazar. Los Misionerios regained the UWA World Trios Championship in 1987 defeating Los Villanos (Villano III, Villano IV and Villano V), after what was considered the "peak" of Los Misionerios. With an influx of other popular trios both in the UWA and in Mexico in general Los Misioneros days on the top of the Trios scene came to an end, which was followed by the end of Los Missioneros de la Muerte in its original form. During a UWA World Trios Championship match against Los Villanos El Texano threw in the towel to save his partner El Signo any more punishment. After the match and title loss his partners turned on El Texano and attacked him after the match. The attack was done primarily to write El Texano out of the UWA storyline as he had given notice that he was leaving.

UWA Promoter Francisco Flores decided to try to keep the Los Misioneros de la Muerte team active even after the departure of El Texano and experimented with a number of different partners for Navarro and El Signo. Teaming with the masked wrestler Black Power Los Misioneros defeated Los Villanos (Villano I, Villano IV and Villano V) to win the UWA Trios Championship. Negro Navarro won the UWA World Junior Heavyweight Championship from Shu El Guerrero on December 27, 1993, and would hold that title until the promotion closed in 1995. The trio held on to the Trios Championship for 454 days, until May 1, 1993, where they lost them to El Engendro, Shu El Guerrero and Scorpio, Jr., they regained the championship later that year, on December 25 and held them into 1994 where they lost the belts back to Engendro, Shu el Guerrero and Scorpio, Jr. Black Power was later replaced by Rocky Santana and that version of Los Misioneros did win the UWA World Trios Championship on two occasions, holding the distinction of being the last team to hold the titles before the UWA closed in 1995. After the end of the UWA Los Misioneros made a few appearances for AAA, UWA's successor of sorts and one of the two biggest wrestling promotions in Mexico along with CMLL. The appearances included a match at Triplemanía III-A where a version of Los Misioneros (Navarro, Signo and a masked wrestler called "Misionero") defeated the team of El Torero, El Mexicano and Dragón de Oro.

=== Independent Circuit ===
After the closure of the UWA in 1995 Negro Navarro and El Signo split up, going their separate ways on the Independent circuit, only teaming together for special occasions. Signo joined AAA and was given a new ring character, a masked heel character called "Piromaniaco" (Pyromaniac) but he only made a few appearances under that name before reverting to his unmasked El Signo identity. In 1996 El Signo began working for Consejo Mundial de Lucha Libre (CMLL; previously known as EMLL) during a time where CMLL were given the rights to the Mexican National Trios Championship by the Mexican boxing and wrestling commission. El Signo teamed up with Blue Panther and Fuerza Guerrera, two wrestlers with a similar background and age to compete in the tournament for the titles. On July 6, 1996, the team defeated El Brazo, Brazo de Plata and Super Electra in the tournament finals to win the championship. During his time in CMLL he had an occasion to team up with Negro Navarro again, for the Salvador Lutteroth Memorial Tag Tournament held as part of Consejo Mundial de Lucha Libre (CMLL; formerly known as EMLL)'s 1999 Homenaje a Dos Leyendas: El Santo y Salvador Lutteroth show on March 19, 1999. Navarro and El Signo teamed up to represent the "old school" wrestlers of Lutteroth's era and defeated Olímpico and Tony Rivera in the first round of the tournament. In the semi-finals they lost to eventual tournament winners Mr. Niebla and Shocker. El Signo stopped working full-time for CMLL in 1999 or 2000, despite still being part of the Mexican National Trios Championship team, leaving the title to be mainly inactive and not highly promoted. El Signo made a special appearance for CMLL on March 3, 2001, on their Juicio Final ("Final Justice") show, losing the Mexican National Trios Championship to Mr. Niebla, Olímpico and Safari. In 2003 El Signo worked a number of matches for AAA, including a match where the original Los Misioneros were reunited for AAA's 2003 Guerra de Titanes show where they defeated El Brazo, Sangre Chicana and Pirata Morgan. In the following years El Signo primarily worked on the Mexican independent circuit, wrestling other wrestlers who were considered "Old School", wrestlers who made their debut in the mid-1980s or before. He had a number of matches against Villano III, including at least two occasions where he lost a Luchas de Apuestas against him. El Signo had his last professional wrestling match on May 1, 2010, as he participated in a ten-man steel cage match that was the main event of the "El Signo Retirement Show" in Arena Neza. The match saw Halcon Dorado, Jr. lose the match and was forced to unmask.

== Championships and accomplishments ==
- Consejo Mundial de Lucha Libre
  - Mexican National Trios Championship (1 time) – with Blue Panther and Fuerza Guerrera
- Universal Wrestling Association
  - UWA World Junior Light Heavyweight Championship (1 time)
  - UWA World Light Heavyweight Championship (2 times)
  - UWA World Lightweight Championship (1 time)
  - UWA World Trios Championship (6 times) – With Negro Navarro and El Texano (2), Negro Navarro and Black Power II (2), Negro Navarro and Rocky Santana (2)
  - UWA World Welterweight Championship (1 time)
  - WWF Light Heavyweight Championship (1 time) (Note: Prior to 1997 the WWF title was promoted almost exclusively in Mexico under an agreement with the World Wrestling Federation. In 1997 the WWF decided to promote the Light Heavyweight Championship on their own shows, not officially recognizing the title lineage from before that point in time.)
- Wrestling Observer Newsletter

- Wrestling Observer Newsletter Hall of Fame (Class of 2019) as part of Los Misioneros de la Muerte

== Luchas de Apuestas record ==
Winner (wager)	Loser (wager)	Location	Event	Date	Notes
Gatúbedo (mask)	El Signo (mask)	Naucalpan, State of Mexico	UWA show	1974	
El Cobarde II (mask)	El Signo (hair)	N/A	Live event	N/A	
El Texano (hair)	El Signo (hair)	Naucalpan, State of Mexico	UWA show	N/A	
Perro Aguayo (hair)	El Signo (hair)	Naucalpan, State of Mexico	UWA show	N/A	
Rambo (hair)	El Signo (hair)	Naucalpan, State of Mexico	UWA Live event	N/A	
El Signo (hair)	La Gacela (hair)	N/A	Live event	November 20, 1977	
Black Man and El Matemático (masks)	El Signo and Lobo Rubio (hair)	Naucalpan, State of Mexico	UWA show	January 29, 1978	
El Signo (hair)	Gran Hamada (hair)	Naucalpan, State of Mexico	UWA show	December 17, 1978	
Gran Hamada, Enrique Vera and Kobayashi (hair)	Los Misioneros de la Muerte (hair) (El Signo, El Texano and Negro Navarro)	Mexico City	UWA show	June 7, 1981	
Los Misioneros de la Muerte (hair) (El Signo, El Texano and Negro Navarro)	Takano, Saito and Kobayashi (hair)	Mexico City	UWA show	June 13, 1982	
Villano III (mask)	El Signo (hair)	Naucalpan, State of Mexico	UWA show	August 1, 1982	
El Solitario (mask)	El Signo (hair)	Tijuana, Baja California	UWA show	June 12, 1983	
Babe Face (hair)	El Signo (hair)	Naucalpan, State of Mexico	UWA show	June 24, 1984	(Note: This was a Los Misioneros vs. Los Tigres trios match where the captain of teach team put their hair on the line.)
Los Misioneros de la Muerte (hair) (El Signo, El Texano and Negro Navarro)	El Dandy, Talismán and Jerry Estrada (hair)	Mexico City	UWA show	September 5, 1986	
Ringo Mendoza, Américo Rocca and Tony Salazar (hair)	Los Misioneros de la Muerte (hair) (El Signo, El Texano and Negro Navarro)	Mexico City	EMLL 53rd Anniversary Show	September 19, 1986	
El Signo (hair)	Kato Kung Lee (hair)	Naucalpan, State of Mexico	UWA 14th Anniversary Show	January 29, 1989	
Enrique Vera (hair)	El Signo (hair)	Naucalpan, State of Mexico	Live event	March 4, 1990	
Brazo de Oro (hair)	El Signo (hair)	Mexico City	Live event	November 28, 1990	
El Signo (hair)	El Engendro (hair)	Mexico City	Live event	July 19, 1993	
Latin Lover (hair)	El Signo (hair)	Naucalpan, State of Mexico	Live event	May 1, 1994	
Villano III (mask)	El Signo (hair)	Puebla, Puebla	Live event	July 25, 1994	
Ringo Mendoza (hair)	El Signo (hair)	Mexico City	Live event	September 6, 1998	
El Signo (hair)	Brazo de Oro (hair)	Oaxaca, Oaxaca	Live event	February 11, 2001	
El Signo (hair)	Challenger (mask)	Oaxaca, Oaxaca	Live event	March 18, 2001	
El Signo (hair)	Challenger (hair)	Oaxaca, Oaxaca	Live event	March 25, 2001	
El Signo (hair)	Ray Alcántara (hair)	Oaxaca, Oaxaca	Live event	June 10, 2001	
Villano III (hair)	El Signo (hair)	Mexico City	Live event	July 29, 2001	
El Solar (mask)	El Signo (hair)	Pachuca, Hidalgo	Live event	December 17, 2002	
Justiciero (hair)	El Signo (hair)	Coacalco, State of Mexico	Live event	June 1, 2003	
Villano III (hair)	El Signo (hair)	Querétaro, Querétaro	Live event	August 13, 2004	
Villano III (hair)	El Signo (hair)	Naucalpan, State of Mexico	Live event	January 16, 2005	(Note: This was a Los Misioneros vs. Los Villanos trios match where the captain of teach team put their hair on the line.)
El Dandy (hair)	El Signo (hair)	Pachuca, Hidalgo	Live event	September 14, 2009	(Note: Last two men in a seven-man steel cage match that also included El Fantasma, El Oriental, Villano III, Villano IV and Super Muñeco.)
