= EMLL 53rd Anniversary Show =

Mexican Professional wrestling show

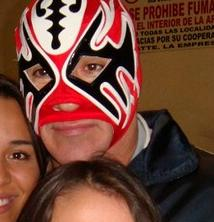
- Atlantis, challenged for the Mexican National Trios Championship
- Promotion: Empresa Mexicana de Lucha Libre
- Date: September 19, 1986
- City: Mexico City, Mexico
- Venue: Arena México
- Attendance: 15,000

Event chronology
← Previous; 31. Aniversario de Arena México	Next → Juicio Final

EMLL Anniversary Show chronology
← Previous; 52nd Anniversary	Next → 54th Anniversary

The EMLL 53rd Anniversary Show (Spanish: 53. Aniversario de EMLL) was a professional wrestling major show event produced by Empresa Mexicana de Lucha Libre (EMLL) that took place on September 19, 1986, in Arena México, Mexico City, Mexico. The event commemorated the 53rd anniversary of CMLL, which would become the oldest professional wrestling promotion in the world. The Anniversary show is EMLL's biggest show of the year, their Super Bowl event. The EMLL Anniversary Show series is the longest-running annual professional wrestling show, starting in 1934.

The main event of the show was a Lucha de Apuestas ("Bet match) where the trio team of Américo Rocca, Tony Salazar and Ringo Mendoza faced Los Misioneros de la Muerte ("The Missionaries of death"; El Signo, Negro Navarro and El Texano) where all three members of the losing team would be forced to have all their hair shaved off after the match. The show also had Los Brazos (El Brazo, Brazo de Oro and Brazo de Plata) defend the Mexican National Trios Championship against Rayo de Jalisco Jr., Atlantis and Ultraman. Additionally Fishman faced Pirata Morgan as a challenger for his UWA World Light Heavyweight Championship, a title not promoted by EMLL themselves but by the Mexican wrestling promotion Universal Wrestling Association (UWA)

== Production ==
=== Background ===
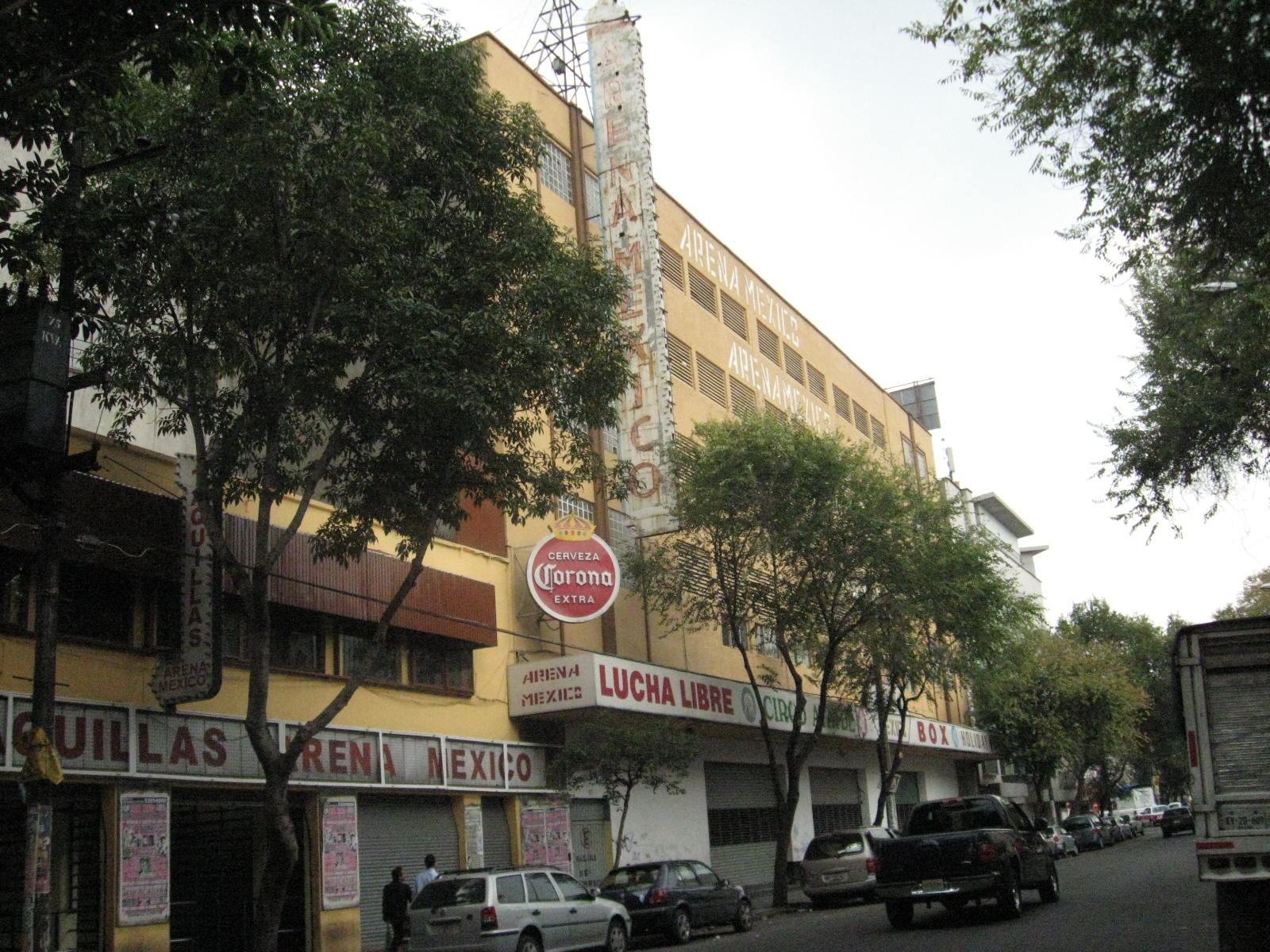
Arena México, CMLL's main venue and location of the Anniversary Show

The Mexican Lucha libre (professional wrestling) company Consejo Mundial de Lucha Libre (CMLL) started out under the name Empresa Mexicana de Lucha Libre ("Mexican Wrestling Company"; EMLL), founded by Salvador Lutteroth in 1933. Lutteroth, inspired by professional wrestling shows he had attended in Texas, decided to become a wrestling promoter and held his first show on September 21, 1933, marking what would be the beginning of organized professional wrestling in Mexico. Lutteroth would later become known as "the father of Lucha Libre" . A year later EMLL held the EMLL 1st Anniversary Show, starting the annual tradition of the Consejo Mundial de Lucha Libre Anniversary Shows that have been held each year ever since, most commonly in September.

Over the years the anniversary show would become the biggest show of the year for CMLL, akin to the Super Bowl for the National Football League (NFL) or WWE's WrestleMania event. The first anniversary show was held in Arena Modelo, which Lutteroth had bought after starting EMLL. In 1942–43 Lutteroth financed the construction of Arena Coliseo, which opened in April 1943. The EMLL 10th Anniversary Show was the first of the anniversary shows to be held in Arena Coliseo. In 1956 Lutteroth had Arena México built in the location of the original Arena Modelo, making Arena México the main venue of EMLL from that point on. Starting with the EMLL 23rd Anniversary Show, all anniversary shows except for the EMLL 46th Anniversary Show have been held in the arena that would become known as "The Cathedral of Lucha Libre". On occasion EMLL held more than one show labelled as their "Anniversary" show, such as two 33rd Anniversary Shows in 1966. Over time the anniversary show series became the oldest, longest-running annual professional wrestling show. In comparison, WWE's WrestleMania is only the fourth oldest still promoted show (CMLL's Arena Coliseo Anniversary Show and Arena México anniversary shows being second and third). EMLL was supposed to hold the EMLL 52nd Anniversary Show on September 20, 1985, but Mexico City was hit by a magnitude 8.0 earthquake. EMLL canceled the event both because of the general devastation but also over fears that Arena México might not be structurally sound after the earthquake. Traditionally CMLL holds their major events on Friday Nights, replacing their regularly scheduled Super Viernes show.

=== Storylines ===
The event featured at least three professional wrestling matches with different wrestlers involved in pre-existing scripted feuds, plots and storylines. Wrestlers were portrayed as either heels (referred to as rudos in Mexico, those that portray the "bad guys") or faces (técnicos in Mexico, the "good guy" characters) as they followed a series of tension-building events, which culminated in a wrestling match or series of matches. Due to the nature of keeping mainly paper records of wrestling at the time no documentation has been found for the rest of the show.

The 53rd Anniversary Show featured a number of inter-promotional matches between wrestlers from Empresa Mexicana de Lucha Libre (EMLL) and from Universal Wrestling Association (UWA). The UWA started out as a break-off from EMLL in the 1970s but by 1986 the two promotions were able to cooperate on a series of shows throughout Mexico.

== Event ==
While the Lucha de Apuestas or "Bet match" is not rare in Lucha Libre there are very few instances of a Trios Apuestas match where all three members of each team put their masks or hair on the line, the main event of the 53rd Anniversary show was the only anniversary show to ever feature two Trios teams in a Lucha de Apuestas match. In this case Los Misioneros del Muerte ("The Missionaries of Death"; El Signo, Negro Navarro and El Texano) faced off against the tecnico team of Américo Rocca, Tony Salazar and Ringo Mendoza. Los Misioneros was credited with popularizing the Trios match concept in Mexico to the point wherein EMLL/CMLL today it is the most used match format. Since neither team was masked all six men bet their hair on the outcome of the match, with all three members of the losing team being forced to have their hair shaved off after the match. The storyline between the two teams that lead to the Luchas de Apuestas match played off the rivalry between professional wrestling promotions EMLL and UWA where Los Misioneros first became famous. The match ended with "Team EMLL" defeating Los Misioneros and thus all three rudos had to be shaved completely bald while still in the ring.

In one of the few confirmed matches the brothers known collectively as Los Brazos ("The Arms"), El Brazo ("The Arm"), Brazo de Oro ("Golden Arm") and Brazo de Plata ("Silver Arm") defended the Mexican National Trios Championship against the young tecnico team of Rayo de Jalisco Jr., Atlantis and Ultraman. Los Brazos was only the second team to hold the championship, having defeated the inaugural champions Los Infernales("The Infernals"; MS-1, Pirata Morgan and El Satánico) nine months prior. The experienced rudo team successfully defended their championship, winning the match two falls to one by cheating their way to victory. Another match saw UWA representative Fishman put his UWA World Light Heavyweight Championship on the line against CMLL representative Pirata Morgan, successfully retaining the championship with a two-falls to one victory.

=== Results ===
No.	Results	Stipulations
1	Cachorro Mendoza and Stuka vs. Ari Romero and El Enfermero Jr. ended in an unknown manner	Best two-out-of-three falls tag team match
2	Kiss, Kung Fu, and Solar vs. Babe Face, El Dandy, and Talisman ended in an unknown manner	Best two-out-of-three falls six-man "Lucha Libre rules" tag team match
3	Alfonso Dantes, Perro Aguayo, and Villano III defeated Cien Caras, Máscara Año 2000, and Sangre Chicana by disqualification	Best two-out-of-three falls six-man "Lucha Libre rules" tag team match=
4	Fishman (c) defeated Pirata Morgan	Best two-out-of-three falls for the UWA World Light Heavyweight Championship
5	Los Brazos (El Brazo, Brazo de Oro and Brazo de Plata) (c) defeated Rayo de Jalisco Jr., Atlantis and Ultraman	Two out of three falls match for the Mexican National Trios Championship
6	Américo Rocca, Tony Salazar and Ringo Mendoza defeated Los Misioneros de la Muerte (El Signo, Negro Navarro and El Texano)	Best two-out-of-three falls Lucha de Apuestas triple hair vs. triple hair match
(c) / – the champion(s) heading into the match
