= Bonzai Kid =

American retired professional wrestler

Personal information
- Born: Kai Kelly; August 10, 1974 (age 51) Honolulu, Hawaii

Professional wrestling career
- Ring name: Bonzai Kid
- Billed height: 5 ft 9 in (1.75 m)
- Billed weight: 188 lb (85 kg)
- Billed from: Tokyo, Japan
- Trained by: Roger Jonston; Chris Adams
- Debut: November 9, 1992
- Retired: August 1999

Kai Kelly (born August 10, 1974) is an American retired professional wrestler who wrestled in independent promotions throughout the United States, Japan, Mexico and Europe during the mid-1990s under the ring name Bonzai Kid. He was billed at 5'9", 188 lbs, originating from Tokyo, Japan and his debut match was against Omega Sin on November 9, 1992, in Arlington, Texas.

Kelly was raised in a middle-class area of Oahu. His father was an Irish/Hawaiian physician, and his mother was a Japanese nurse. Kelly was a gifted amateur wrestler during his high school years. He won several regional titles, and eventually gravitated to gymnastics to improve his coordination and flexibility. In an article of World Wrestling Magazine (October 1995), Kelly indicated that his passion for wrestling stemmed from his personal discipline in gymnastics and martial arts. His tremendous ability to focus allowed him to earn a 4.0 GPA in high school. He was accepted to Stanford University, but turned down the opportunity to pursue professional wrestling.

During his early career, Bonzai Kid wrestled in the Texas Wrestling promotion, and was trained by legendary trainers Roger Jonston and Chris Adams. Bonzai Kid was appealing to his fans for his high-flying maneuvers as well as his charismatic trash-talks. His signature finisher was the cork-screw flying cross-chop. This is considered one of the most difficult and dangerous moves in professional wrestling. He had several injuries in front of live audiences, most notably the back injury during the match against The Crow on July 2, 1999, in Austin, Texas. This injury resulted in his permanent retirement shortly afterwards.

Bonzai Kid appeared in several WCW events as opening matches. He also appeared as cameo at various NWA and UWA wrestling events. It was rumored that Bonzai Kid appeared in a 1997 pornographic movie titled "Geisha Love" under the stage name Tom Bonzai. It was later proven by wrestling fans in Japan that the male actor in the film, who engaged in sexual acts with 3 different Asian actresses, was not the famous wrestler, but rather a look-alike. This controversy made the news on both continents, and resulted in litigation between Bonzai Kid and the adult movie production company. An undisclosed settlement was eventually reached. In a 1999 telecast of UWA "Slam-A-Jam", Bonzai Kid publicly denounced Hollywood and the entertainment industry for exploiting the likeness of various famous wrestlers over the years.

== Championships and accomplishments ==
- Universal Wrestling Association
  - UWA World Heavyweight Championship (1 time)
  - UWA World Light Heavyweight Championship (1 time)
