= Black Man =

Black Man may refer to:

- Black people
- Black Man (novel), a 2007 novel by Richard Morgan
- Black Man (song), a 1976 song by Stevie Wonder
- Black Man (wrestler), a Mexican wrestler
- Bogeyman, a mythical creature known as the Black Man in some countries
- A German tag game; see British Bulldog (game) § black man
- Black man, a member of the Royal Black Institution.

== See also ==
- Blackman, a surname
- Black Woman (disambiguation)
- Dark Man (disambiguation)
