= Misioneros de la Muerte =

Professional wrestling tag team

Tag team
- Members: El Texano Jr. Súper Nova; Demonio Infernal
- Billed heights: El Texano 1.85 m (6 ft 1 in); Súper Nova 1.66 m (5 ft 5 1/2 in); Negro Navarro 1.75 m (5 ft 9 in); El Signo 1.72 m (5 ft 7 1/2 in); El Texano 1.70 m (5 ft 7 in); Rocky Santana 1.73 m (5 ft 8 in)
- Former members: Negro Navarro; El Signo; El Texano; Black Power (II); Rocky Santana; Misionero
- Debut: 1977

Los Misioneros de la Muerte (Spanish for the Missionaries of Death) is a Mexican Lucha libre Trio.

The group has been credited with making the two out of three falls six-man tag team match the most common match form in Mexico instead of the traditional one-on-one match that is the most common match everywhere else besides Japan.

The original Los Misioneros trio consisted of Negro Navarro, El Signo and El Texano and worked together as a unit from 1977 until 1987. Later versions of Los Misioneros featured Navarro and Signo teaming with wrestlers such as Black Power, Rocky Santana or El Texano, Jr. but their success never approached the success of the original team. The original Los Misioneros would occasionally reunite in the years following their 1987 break-up, but with the 2006 death of El Texano the Los Misioneros de la Muerte was not used by Navarro and El Signo. El Signo retired in 2010, making Negro Navarro the only active competitor left of the trio.

The fourth incarnation which was formed in 2026 consists of El Texano Jr. (the son of El Texano), Súper Nova and Demonio Infernal.

== History ==
In the late 1970s Mexican professional wrestling promotion Universal Wrestling Association (UWA) were inspired by the success of lightweight wrestlers in other promotions and wanted to create a number of Mexican lightweight stars to capitalize on the success of the division. Promoter Francisco Flores decided to team up three young, smaller wrestlers including Antonio Sánchez Rendón, known under the ring name El Signo, Miguel Calderón Navarro, known as Negro Navarro and Juan Conrado Aguilar Jáuregui, known as El Texano. The trio was dubbed Los Misioneros de la Muerte ("The Missionaries of Death") and played the heel role (wrestlers who portray the "bad guys"). The three were matched up a trio of brothers who like Los Misioneros were young and lightweights, the team of Brazo de Oro ("Golden Hand"), Brazo de Plata ("Silver Arm") and El Brazo ("The Arm"), dubbed Los Mosqueteros de Diablo (The Devil's Musketeers). Early on in the storyline Brazo de Oro defeated El Texano in a Luchas de Apuestas, or bet match, which forced El Texano to unmask. The storyline expanded and saw the unmasked Misionaros clash with the masked Mosqueteros on UWA promoted cards all over Mexico. The fan reception to those matches and the positive coverage in various Lucha Libre magazines was so big that other promoters around Mexico wanted to book them on their shows, not as individuals but as teams, which was the start of the trios match becoming more and more prominent in Lucha Libre. With the team being so in demand UWA started to feature Los Misioneros more often that by 1981 Los Misioneros began working high on the card, often working the main event match starting a trend of having trios matches instead of singles matches as the regular main event match format, something that helped make that match format the most common match type in Lucha Libre since then.

The UWA had a tradition of inviting Japanese wrestlers from New Japan Pro-Wrestling (NJPW) to come to Mexico for shorter or longer tours, traditionally they used the Japanese Heavyweights, but with the emergence of Los Misioneros they began using younger, lower card wrestlers for matches against Los Misioneros. One such rivalry saw the team of Gran Hamada, Kobayashi and Enrique Vera defeat Los Misioneros in a Luchas de Apuestas match, forcing the three of them to have their hair shaved off as a result. In 1981 the Los Misioneros de la Muerte name became a household name after a match in El Toreo de Quatro Caminos ("The Bullring with four corners"), UWA's main venue. During the main event Los Misioneros faced off against then 64-year-old El Santo, teaming with Huracán Ramírez and Rayo de Jalisco. In that match El Santo collapsed in the middle of the ring, suffering a heart attack during the match. His life was only saved due to the quick witted actions of Ramírez. After the match the Lucha Libre magazinez, prompted by Francisco Flores, played off the real life tragedy by promoting Los Misioneros as the team that nearly killed the biggest name in Lucha Libre ever. The event made the team the most hated trio in Mexico for years to come and helped fill El Torero arena to the brim when Los Misioneros teamed up with Perro Aguayo to face El Santo, Gory Guerrero, Huracán Ramírez and El Solitario in El Santo's retirement match. Following Santo's retirement Los Misioneros feuded with the top faces (wrestlers portraying "good guy" characters) such as Los Tres Caballero (Aníbal, El Solitario and Villano III both in trios and in individual competition. During the storyline El Solitario turned on his two partners, when he attacked El Signo with a bottle and costing Los Tres Caballeros an important match. The attack made the smaller Los Misioneros more sympathetic to the crowd, who began to support them more and more despite Los Misioneros being booked on the shows as heel characters ("bad guys"). The trio also continued fighting various Japanese teams, including defeating the team of Kobayashi, Saito and Takano at the UWA 7th Anniversary Show on February 14, 1982, and again a few months later in a Luchas de Apuestas match that saw the Japanese trio leave Mexico with their hair shaved off. Their popularity as a trio also led to them being invited to tour Japan, facing off against New Japan Pro-Wrestling (NJPW) light weight wrestlers such as Gran Hamada, Tiger Mask, Takano, Akira Maeda and Osamu Kido. In 1984 Los Misioneros won the UWA World Trios Championship for the first time, although it is not documented for exactly how long. In the mid-1980s the "War" between the UWA and EMLL had cooled off enough for Los Misionerios to actually work a series of EMLL shows leading up to the EMLL 53rd Anniversary Show. In the weeks before the show Los Misioneros defeated the trio of El Dandy, Talismán and Jerry Estrada in a Luchas de Apuestas match during CMLL"s weekly Super Viernes show. This was part of the build to the main event of the 53rd Anniversary where Los Misioneros lost a Luchas de Apuestas match to CMLL mainstays Ringo Mendoza, Américo Rocca and Tony Salazar and thus were forced to get all their hair shaved off as a result of the loss. Los Misionerios regained the UWA World Trios Championship in 1987 defeating Los Villanos (Villano III, Villano IV and Villano V), after what was considered the "peak" of Los Misionerios. With an influx of other popular trios both in the UWA and in Mexico in general Los Misioneros days on the top of the Trios scene came to an end, which was followed by the end of Los Missioneros de la Muerte in its original form. During a UWA World Trios Championship match against Los Villanos El Texano threw in the towel to save his partner El Signo any more punishment. After the match and title loss his partners turned on El Texano and attacked him. The attack was done primarily to write El Texano out of the UWA storyline as he had given notice that he was leaving.

=== Los Misioneros Version 2 ===
UWA Promoter Francisco Flores decided to try to keep the Los Misioneros de la Muerte team active even after the departure of El Texano and experimented with a number of different partners for Navarro and El Signo. The first replacement was a masked wrestler called "Black Power", who teamed up with the remaining Los Misioneros to defeat Los Villanos (Villano I, Villano IV and Villano V) to win the UWA Trios Championship. The trio held on to the Trios Championship for 454 days, until May 1, 1993, where they lost them to El Engendro, Shu El Guerrero and Scorpio, Jr., they regained the championship later that year, on December 25 and held them into 1994 where they lost the belts back to Engendro, Shu el Guerrero and Scorpio, Jr. During their run as a team El Texano returned to the UWA and on one occasion Texano defeated Black Power, now unmasked, in a Luchas de Apuestas match, forcing him to have all his hair shaved off.

=== Los Misioneros Version 3 ===
Black Power was later replaced by Rocky Santana and that version of Los Misioneros went on to win the UWA Trios Championship from El Engendro, Shu El Guerrero and Scorpio, Jr. on June 6, 1994. Four months later they lost the championship to VIllano V, Shu El Guerrero and Scorpio, Jr. but regained them only a week later. Los Misioneros were the last team to hold the UWA World Trios Championship while the UWA was an active promotion, still the champions when the UWA closed in 1995. After the UWA disbanded Los Misioneros worked a few shows for AAA, UWA's successor of sorts and one of the two biggest wrestling promotions along with CMLL. The appearances included a match at Triplemanía III-A where a version of Los Misioneros (Navarro, Signo and a masked wrestler called "Misionero", possibly Rocky Santana under a mask) defeated the team of El Torero, El Mexicano and Dragón de Oro.

=== Independent circuit ===
After a few matches for AAA Negro Navarro and El Signo split up, going their separate ways on the Independent circuit, only teaming together for special occasions. One such occasion was for the Salvador Lutteroth Memorial Tag Tournament held as part of Consejo Mundial de Lucha Libre (CMLL; formerly known as EMLL)'s 1999 Homenaje a Dos Leyendas: El Santo y Salvador Lutteroth show on March 19, 1999. Navarro and El Signo teamed up to represent the "old school" wrestlers of Lutteroth's era and defeated Olímpico and Tony Rivera in the first round of the tournament. In the semi-finals they lost to eventual tournament winners Mr. Niebla and Shocker. In the mid-1990s Navarro had a brief stint as the masked character Último Vampiro, although others used the name and character after him and are more identified with that name. In 2003 Navarro worked a number of matches for AAA, including a match where the original Los Misioneros were reunited for AAA's 2003 Guerra de Titanes show where they defeated El Brazo, Sangre Chicana and Pirata Morgan. Navarro and El Signo began teaming with Juan Aguilar Leos, son of El Texano who had adopted the ring name El Texano, Jr. as he began to team with Navarro and El Signo under the Los Misioneros name. With the 2006 death of El Texano the Los Misioneros de la Muerte was not used by Navarro and El Signo. El Signo retired in 2010, making Negro Navarro the only active competitor left of the trio.

=== Fourth incarnation ===
El Texano Jr., the son of El Texno, reformed the stable with Súper Nova and Demonio Infernal in June 2026, calling themselves "Los Misioneros de la Muerte NG" and "Los Nuevos Misioneros de la Muerte". The group debuted in Lucha Libre AAA on 21 November 2026, with Texano Jr. and Infernal attacking the Wagner Brothers (El Hijo de Dr. Wagner Jr. and Galeno).

== Championships and accomplishments ==
- Universal Wrestling Association
  - UWA World Trios Championship (6 times) – Negro Navarro, El Signo and El Texano (2), Negro Navarro, El Signo and Black Power II (2), Negro Navarro, El Signo and Rocky Santana (2)
- Wrestling Observer Newsletter

- Wrestling Observer Newsletter Hall of Fame (Class of 2019) - Negro Navarro, El Signo and El Texano

== Luchas de Apuestas record ==
Winner (wager)	Loser (wager)	Location	Event	Date	Notes
Gran Hamada, Kobayashi and Enrique Vera (hair)	Los Misioneros de la Muerte (hair) (El Signo, El Texano and Negro Navarro)	Mexico City	Live event	June 7, 1981	
Los Misioneros de la Muerte (hair) (El Signo, El Texano and Negro Navarro)	Kobayashi, Saito and Takano (hair)	Mexico City	Live event	June 13, 1982	
Los Misioneros de la Muerte (hair) (El Signo, El Texano and Negro Navarro)	El Dandy, Talismán and Jerry Estrada (hair)	Mexico City	Live event	September 5, 1986	
Ringo Mendoza, Américo Rocca and Tony Salazar (hair)	Los Misioneros de la Muerte (hair) (El Signo, El Texano and Negro Navarro)	Mexico City	EMLL 53rd Anniversary Show	September 19, 1986	
