= Darkman (disambiguation) =

Darkman is a 1990 film directed by Sam Raimi

Darkman or Dark Man may also refer to:

- Darkman (character), the protagonist of the film of the same name
- Darkman (video game), a video game based on the film
- Darkman (rapper), also as Nana, a German rapper
- Dark Man, a character in the video game Mega Man 5

== See also ==
- The Dark Man (disambiguation)
- Black Man (disambiguation)
