= Black Woman =

Black Woman may refer to:

- Black women
- Black Woman (album), by Sonny Sharrock
- Black Woman, an album by Judy Mowatt
- "Femme noire", a poem by Léopold Sédar Senghor

== See also ==
- Black Man (disambiguation)
- Black people
