= The Dark Man =

The Dark Man may refer to:

- The Dark Man (film), directed by Jeffrey Dell (1951)
- The Dark Man (poem), by Stephen King
- Randall Flagg, a fictional character in several Stephen King works

== See also ==
- Dark Man (disambiguation)
