= Negro Navarro =

Mexican professional wrestler

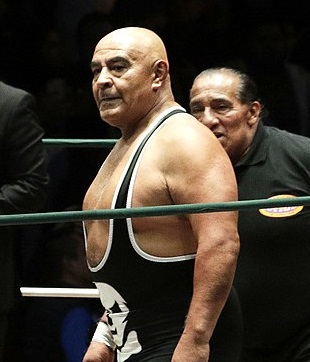
- Negro Navarro in the ring in 2018

Personal information
- Born: Miguel Calderón Navarro; June 12, 1957 (age 69) Mexico City, Mexico

Professional wrestling career
- Ring name(s): El Chupacabras; Negro Navarro; Último Vampiro
- Billed height: 1.75 m (5 ft 9 in)
- Billed weight: 90 kg (198 lb)
- Trained by: Florentino Martínez
- Debut: June 12, 1975

Negro Navarro (born June 12, 1957) is the ring name of Miguel Calderón Navarro, a Mexican professional wrestler. Navarro works as a freelancer on the Mexican independent circuit as well as making regular appearances for International Wrestling Revolution Group (IWRG). Navarro often teams with his sons, who are known as Trauma I and Trauma II. Negro Navarro was part of Los Misioneros de la Muerte ("The Missionaries of Death") with El Signo and El Texano; a team that is credited with popularizing the Trios match in Mexico to the point that it became the most common match for teams in various professional wrestling promotions in the country.

== Personal life ==
Navarro was born on June 12, 1957, in Mexico City and grew up idolizing the Mexican professional wrestler Black Shadow, deciding at a young age that he wanted to pursue the same career as his idol and become a professional wrestler. He trained under Florentino Martinez, a local Mexico City wrestling trainer. Later in life Navarro would marry a woman who was the cousin of his wrestling partner Juan Conrado Aguilar, also known as El Texano. Together they have two children who have also become professional wrestlers. They currently work as the enmascarado (masked) characters Trauma I and Trauma II, keeping their birth name private per lucha libre (the professional wrestling style originary from Mexico) traditions. Navarro is related through marriage to Juan Aguilar Leos, known in wrestling circles as El Texano, Jr and Super Nova, both sons of Juan Aguilar. Miguel Navarro's brothers are also wrestlers, working under the ring names Apolo Navarro and Drako. He is also related through marriage to wrestlers Jonathan de Jesus Navarro Jímenez (works under the name Mictlán), Juan Miguel Escalante Grande (known as Inquisidor), Pólvora (enmascarado) and Roberto Gutiérrez Frías, better known as El Dandy.

== Professional wrestling career ==
Unlike a lot of professional wrestlers in Mexico Navarro did not start out as an enmascarado, or masked wrestler, opting to simply go with a variation of his birth name as his ring name, Negro Navarro, (Spanish for "Black" Navarro), inspired by his childhood idol Black Shadow. He made his professional wrestling debut on June 12, 1975, his 18th birthday. At that point in time the heavyweight wrestlers were considered the "main events" and lighter wrestlers like Navarro were relegated to the lower ranks.

=== Los Misioneros de la Muerte ===
In the late 1970s, Navarro began working for Universal Wrestling Association (UWA) as they wanted to feature more wrestlers in the lighter divisions to strengthen their shows, having seen how popular these divisions were starting to become elsewhere. UWA promoter Francisco Flores wanted to build some of the lesser known lightweights into high card workers and decided put Navarro together with two similarly sized wrestlers, El Texano and Antonio Sánchez Rendón, known under the ring name El Signo, to form Los Misioneros de la Muerte ("The Missionaries of Death"). They were paired up against a trio of young, lightweight and high flying brothers dubbed Los Mosqueteros de Diablo (The Devil's Musketeers), Brazo de Oro ("Golden Arm"), Brazo de Plata ("Silver Arm") and El Brazo ("The Arm"). Early in the storyline Brazo de Oro defeated El Texano in a Luchas de Apuestas, or bet match, which forced El Texano to unmask. The storyline expanded and saw the unmasked Misionaros clash with the masked Mosqueteros on UWA promoted cards all over Mexico. The fan reception to those matches and the positive coverage in various Lucha Libre magazines was so big that other promoters around Mexico wanted to book them on their shows, not as individuals but as teams, which was the start of the trios match becoming more and more prominent in Lucha Libre. With the team being so in demand, UWA started to feature Los Misioneros more often and by 1981 Los Misioneros began working high on the card, often working the main event match starting a trend of having trios matches instead of singles matches as the regular main event match format, something that helped make that match format the most common match type in Lucha Libre since then.

In 1981 the Los Misioneros de la Muerte name became a household name after a match in El Toreo de Quatro Caminos ("The Bullring with four corners"), UWA's main venue. During the main event Los Misioneros faced off against then 64-year-old El Santo, teaming with Huracán Ramírez and Rayo de Jalisco. In that match El Santo collapsed in the middle of the ring, suffering a heart attack during the match. His life was only saved due to the quick witted actions of Ramírez. After the match the Lucha Libre magazines, prompted by Francisco Flores, played off the real life tragedy by promoting Los Misioneros as the team that nearly killed the biggest name in Lucha Libre ever. The event made the team the most hated trio in Mexico for years to come and helped fill El Torero arena to the brim when Los Misioneros teamed up with Perro Aguayo to face El Santo, Gory Guerrero, Huracán Ramírez and El Solitario in El Santo's retirement match. Following Santo's retirement Los Misioneros feuded with the top faces (wrestlers portraying "good guy" characters) such as Los Tres Caballero (Aníbal, El Solitario and Villano III) both in trios and in individual competition. During the storyline El Solitario turned on his two partners, when he attacked El Signo with a bottle and cost Los Tres Caballeros an important match. The attack made the smaller Los Misioneros more sympathetic to the crowd, who began to support them more and more despite Los Misioneros being booked on the shows as heel characters ("bad guys"). Their popularity as a trio also led to them being invited to tour Japan, facing off against New Japan Pro-Wrestling (NJPW) lightweight wrestlers such as Gran Hamada, Tiger Mask, George Takano, Akira Maeda, and Osamu Kido. In 1984 Los Misioneros won the UWA World Trios Championship for the first time, although the length of their reign is not documented. On January 1, 1985, Negro Navarro won his first singles championship, the UWA World Junior Light Heavyweight Championship, when he defeated the then champion Aníbal. The title run only lasted 50 days, ending on February 25, 1985 when he lost to Mano Negra. In the mid 1980s the "War" between the UWA and EMLL had cooled off enough for Los Misionerios to actually wrestle on the EMLL 53rd Anniversary Show, losing a trios Luchas de Apuestas to Ringo Mendoza, Américo Rocca, and Tony Salazar. Los Misionerios regained the UWA World Trios Championship in 1987 defeating Los Villanos (Villano III, Villano IV and Villano V), after what was considered the "peak" of Los Misionerios. With an influx of other popular trios both in the UWA and in Mexico in general Los Misioneros days on the top of the Trios scene came to an end, which was followed by the end of Los Missioneros de la Muerte in its original form. During a UWA World Trios Championship match against Los Villanos El Texano threw in the towel to save his partner El Signo any more punishment. After the match and title loss his partners turned on El Texano and attacked him. The attack was done primarily to write El Texano out of the UWA storyline as he had given notice that he was leaving.

UWA Promoter Francisco Flores decided to try to keep the Los Misioneros de la Muerte team active even after the departure of El Texano and experimented with a number of different partners for Navarro and El Signo. Teaming with the masked wrestler Black Power, Los Misioneros defeated Los Villanos (Villano I, Villano IV, and Villano V) to win the UWA Trios Championship. Negro Navarro won the UWA World Junior Heavyweight Championship from Shu El Guerrero on December 27, 1993, and held the title until the promotion closed in 1995. The trio held on to the Trios Championship for 454 days, until May 1, 1993, where they lost it to El Engendro, Shu El Guerrero, and Scorpio, Jr. They regained the championship later that year on December 25, and held it into 1994 where they lost the belts back to Engendro, Shu El Guerrero, and Scorpio, Jr. Black Power was later replaced by Rocky Santana and the new version of Los Misioneros won the UWA World Trios Championship on two occasions, and were the last team to hold the title before the UWA closed in 1995. Near the end of the UWA Los Misioneros made a few appearances for AAA, UWA's successor of sorts and one of the two biggest wrestling promotions along with CMLL. The appearances included a match at Triplemanía III-A where a version of Los Misioneros (Navarro, Signo, and a masked wrestler called "Misionero") defeated the team of El Torero, El Mexicano, and Dragón de Oro.

=== Independent circuit ===
After the closure of the UWA in 1995 Negro Navarro and El Signo split up, going their separate ways on the independent circuit, only teaming together on special occasions. One such occasion was for the Salvador Lutteroth Memorial Tag Tournament held as part of Consejo Mundial de Lucha Libre (CMLL; formerly known as EMLL)'s 1999 Homenaje a Dos Leyendas: El Santo y Salvador Lutteroth show on March 19, 1999. Navarro and El Signo teamed up to represent the "old school" wrestlers of Lutteroth's era and defeated Olímpico and Tony Rivera in the first round of the tournament. In the semi-finals they lost to eventual tournament winners Mr. Niebla and Shocker. In the mid-1990s Navarro had a brief stint as the masked character Último Vampiro, although others used the name and character after him and are more identified with that name. In 2003 Navarro worked a number of matches for AAA, including a match where the original Los Misioneros were reunited for AAA's 2003 Guerra de Titanes show where they defeated El Brazo, Sangre Chicana, and Pirata Morgan. He also worked a few shows as "El Chupacabras", a masked gimmick invented by AAA but abandoned it after only a few shows. Navarro and El Signo began teaming with Juan Aguilar Leos, son of El Texano who had adopted the ring name El Texano, Jr.

=== La Dinastia de la Muerte ===
Navarros' two sons made their professional wrestling debut in 2002 and by the mid-2000s it was public knowledge that they were the sons of Negro Navarro as they often worked together; whenever Navarro teamed with one of both of his sons the team was referred to as La Dinastia de la Muerte, a name that refers both to the fact that they are a family (a "dynasty") and also referring to Los Missioneros. Navarro also wrestled a long series of matches against El Solar, a luchador of a similar age, drawing great reviews for their "old school" type matches that often resulted in fans throwing money in the ring after the match, a traditional sign of respect in Mexico. The two wrestlers often fought over the Americas Light Heavyweight Champion, a title with no promotional backing but was considered more a "personal title" that Navarro and El Solar used to help promote their matches. The Americas title was on some occasions billed as the South America Light Heavyweight Championship, with the story being that it was actually a title from Panama. Navarro and Trauma I competed in a tournament for the IWRG Intercontinental Tag Team Championship in a father/son tournament, but lost to Pirata Morgan and Hijo de Pirata Morgan in the finals. Navarro initially worked "legends" matches against El Solar on IWRG shows, but by 2010 worked for them on a regular basis, often teaming with his sons. On March 18, 2012, Navarro and Trauma I defeated Pirata Morgan and Hijo de Pirata Morgan to win the IWRG Intercontinental Tag Team Championship. In late 2012 Navarro supposedly won the FMLL Masters Championship in Japan, although it is thought to be a storyline to explain why Navarro replaced the Americas title with a new belt for some shows. On March 31, 2013, Los Traumas competed in IWRG's La Guerra de Familias ("War of the Families") tournament. The team defeated La Familia de Tijuana (Mosco X-Fly and Eterno) in the first round. During the match Trauma I reaggravated an old knee injury and was not allowed to compete in the finals where Trauma II lost to Hijo de Máscara Año 2000 and Cien Caras, Jr. Following the loss Los Junior Dinamitas challenged Trauma I and Negro Navarro to defend their titles a week later. A week later Los Junior Dinamitas wrestled Trauma I and Negro Navarro for the IWRG Intercontinental Tag Team Championship, but lost. On August 11, Navarro and Trauma I lost the IWRG Intercontinental Tag Team Championship to La Familia de Tijuana (Eterno and X-Fly). On August 9, 2015 Negro Navarro and Las Traumas won the IWRG Intercontinental Trios Championship from Los Piratas (Pirata Mogan, Pirata Morgan Jr. and El Hijo de Pirata Mogan).

=== CMLL Arena Coliseo Tag Team Championship ===
On December 25, 2016 Negro Navarro and Black Terry, two independent wrestlers who do not work for CMLL, defeated the team of Guerrero Maya Jr. and The Panther for the CMLL Arena Coliseo Tag Team Championship, the match took place at the Lucha Memes show "Chairo 7: Hell In a Christmas Cell", a non-CMLL show. On February 19, 2017 Navarro and Black Terry made their first successful defense against CMLL wrestlers Sanson and Cuatrero at a Lucha Memes show. On March 26, 2017 Navarro and Black Terry made their second successful defense against CMLL wrestlers Hechicero and Virus at a Lucha Memes show. On April 12, 2017 Navarro and Black Terry made their third successful defense against CMLL wrestlers Blue Panther and The Panther at a CMLL show.

== Championships and accomplishments ==
- Alianza Universal de Lucha Libre
  - AULL Trios Championship (1 time, current) – with Robin Maravilla and Rocky Santana
- Consejo Mundial de Lucha Libre/Lucha Memes
  - CMLL Arena Coliseo Tag Team Championship (1 time) – with Black Terry
- Federacion Internacional de Lucha Libre
  - FILL Maestros Championship (1 time, current)
- International Wrestling Revolution Group
  - IWRG Intercontinental Tag Team Championship (1 time) – with Trauma I
  - IWRG Intercontinental Trios Championship (1 time) – with Trauma I and Trauma II
  - El Protector (2015) - with Metaleón
- Mexican Regional promotions
  - Americas Light Heavyweight Championship / South America Light Heavyweight Championship (2 times) (Note: The same championship belt has been promoted under both names for various wrestling events.)
  - FLLM Masters Championship (3 times)
  - Mexico State Lightweight Championship (1 time)
- New Generation Wrestling
  - NWG Intercontinental Championship (1 time)
- Universal Wrestling Association
  - UWA World Trios Championship (6 times) – With El Signo and El Texano (2), El Signo and Black Power II (2), El Signo and Rocky Santana (2)
  - UWA World Junior Light Heavyweight Championship (1 time)
  - UWA World Junior Heavyweight Championship (1 time)
- Wrestling Observer Newsletter

- Wrestling Observer Newsletter Hall of Fame (Class of 2019) as part of Los Misioneros de la Muerte

== Luchas de Apuestas record ==
Winner (wager)	Loser (wager)	Location	Event	Date	Notes
El Cobarde II (hair)	Negro Navarro (hair)	N/A	Live event	N/A	
MS-1 (hair)	Negro Navarro (hair)	N/A	Live event	N/A	
Negro Navarro (hair)	Pepe Casas (hair)	N/A	Live event	N/A	
Negro Navarro (hair)	Lobo Rubio (hair)	N/A	Live event	N/A	
Negro Navarro (hair)	Roller (hair)	Guadalajara, Jalisco	Live event	N/A	
Negro Navarro (hair)	El Brazo (hair)	Ciudad Nezahualcóyotl, State of Mexico	Live event	N/A	
Momia de Guanajuato (mask) and Huichol Tapatío (hair)	Black Terry (hair) and Príncipe Dorado (mask)	Guadalajara, Jalisco	February 9, 1975	N/A	
Gran Hamada, Kobayashi and Enrique Vera (hair)	Los Misioneros de la Muerte (hair) (El Signo, El Texano and Negro Navarro	Mexico City	Live event	June 7, 1981	
Los Misioneros de la Muerte (hair) (El Signo, El Texano and Negro Navarro	Kobayashi, Saito and Takano (hair)	Mexico City	Live event	June 13, 1982	
Perro Aguayo (hair)	Negro Navarro (hair)	Tijuana, Baja California	Live event	May 27, 1983	
Los Misioneros de la Muerte (El Signo, El Texano and Negro Navarro) (hair)	El Dandy, Talismán and Jerry Estrada (hair)	Mexico City	Live event	September 5, 1986	
Ringo Mendoza, Américo Rocca and Tony Salazar (hair)	Los Misioneros de la Muerte (hair) (El Signo, El Texano and Negro Navarro	Mexico City	EMLL 53rd Anniversary Show	September 19, 1986	
Perro Aguayo (hair)	Negro Navarro (hair)	Naucalpan, State of Mexico	Live event	June 2, 1991	
Tony Rivera (hair)	Negro Navarro (hair)	Puebla, Puebla	Live event	February 1, 1999	
Negro Navarro (hair)	Brazo de Oro (hair)	Ciudad Nezahualcóyotl, State of Mexico	Live event	June 1, 2001	
El Dandy (hair)	Negro Navarro (hair)	Tlalnepantla de Baz, State of Mexico	Live event	September 3, 2001	
Justiciero (hair)	Negro Navarro (hair)	Coacalco de Berriozábal, State of Mexico	Live event	November 29, 2002	(Note: Participants in a triangle match that also included Andy Barrow/)
Cuchillo (hair)	Negro Navarro (hair)	Mexico City	Live event	2003	
Rocky Santana (hair)	Negro Navarro (hair)	Tlalnepantla de Baz, State of Mexico	Live event	June 29, 2003	
Pierroth II (hair)	Negro Navarro (hair)	Tizayuca, Hidalgo	Live event	November 20, 2005	(Note: Last two men in a 7-man steel cage match.)
Don Ramon (Hair)	Negro Navarro (hair)	Distrito Federal	Triplemania 16	October 4, 2017	
