= Kuniaki Kobayashi =

Japanese professional wrestler (1956–2024)

Personal information
- Born: Kuniaki Kobayashi; January 11, 1956 Komoro, Nagano, Japan
- Died: September 9, 2024 (aged 68) Tokyo, Japan

Professional wrestling career
- Ring name(s): Chin Kobiashi; Kid Koby; Kobayashi; Kuniaki Kobayashi; Taro Kobayashi
- Billed height: 1.83 m (6 ft 0 in)
- Billed weight: 105 kg (231 lb)
- Trained by: Kotetsu Yamamoto; Masa Saito
- Debut: February 1, 1973
- Retired: April 21, 2000

Kuniaki Kobayashi (小林邦昭, Kobayashi Kuniaki; January 11, 1956 – September 9, 2024) was a Japanese professional wrestler, most notable for being the generational rival of the famous Tiger Mask character in Japanese puroresu. He wrestled numerous acclaimed matches against Tiger Mask I and Tiger Mask II.

== Early life ==
Kobayashi competed in the shot put.

== Professional wrestling career ==
=== New Japan Pro-Wrestling (1973–1980) ===
After dropping out of high school, Kobayashi joined the New Japan Pro Wrestling Dojo in 1972 at the young age of 16. On December 3, 1972, he wrestled Gran Hamada in his pre-debut match, while on January 20, 1973, he took part in another pre-debut match, teaming with Tatsumi Fujinami in a handicap match against Kotetsu Yamamoto. He officially debuted for New Japan Pro-Wrestling on February 1, 1973, against Masanobu Kurisu, at the early age of 17. Kobayashi stayed on the undercard, until he was sent abroad to North America in 1980.

=== North American excursion (1980–1982) ===
Upon entering North America in 1980, Kobayashi's first stop was in Mexico for Universal Wrestling Association, where he made his mark by trying to unmask the other luchadores, especially Los Villanos. He also would wrestle against Los Misioneros de la Muerte putting their hair on the line. On June 6, 1981, in their first hair vs. hair encounter, Kobayashi's team, consisted of him, Gran Hamada and Enrique Vera defeated the Misioneros. Two months later, Kobayashi teamed with Saito against Coloso Colossetti and César Valentino with their hairs on the line, with Kobayashi's team once again being victorious. One year later, on June 13, 1982, Kobayashi, Saito and Takano against the Misioneros, and this time, Kobayashi's team lost the match, and got their heads shaved.

After his feud with the Misioneros ended, Kobayashi moved to the United States, in Los Angeles for NWA Hollywood Wrestling, where he wrestled under the name Kid Koby, winning the NWA Americas Heavyweight Championship from Timothy Flowers on July 18, 1982. He held the championship for one month, before losing it to Black Gordman.

=== New Japan Pro-Wrestling (1982–1984) ===
Upon returning to New Japan in October 1982, Kobayashi was involved in a feud with Tiger Mask. Because of his anti-heroic actions, he became regarded as the "Tiger Hunter". He also allied with Riki Choshu, Masa Saito, and Killer Khan to form the stable "Ishin Gundan" ("Restruction Force"). As an Ishin Gundan member, he mostly teamed with Isamu Teranishi in tag team action, facing New Japan's loyalists in numerous encounters, most notably Tatsumi Fujinami, Kengo Kimura, Kantaro Hoshino and a young Nobuhiko Takada. In September 1984, Ishin Gundan left NJPW to form Japan Pro Wrestling (JPW).

=== All Japan Pro Wrestling (1984–1987) ===
Japan Pro Wrestling had a working agreement with All Japan Pro Wrestling (AJPW). While there, Kobayashi feuded with Tiger Mask II, and he held the NWA International Junior Heavyweight Championship by defeating Dynamite Kid on June 13, 1985 and the World Junior Heavyweight Championship after defeating Hiro Saito on November 23, 1986, and also feuded with All Japan's loyalists, such as Norio Honaga, Jumbo Tsuruta, Takashi Ishikawa and Mighty Inoue. After two years, Ishin Gundan left AJPW in March 1987 to return to New Japan.

=== New Japan Pro-Wrestling (1987–2000) ===
Upon returning to New Japan in 1987, Kobayashi won the vacated IWGP Junior Heavyweight Championship on August 20, by defeating Nobuhiko Takada in a tournament final, successfully defending it against the likes of Shiro Koshinaka, Owen Hart, Keiichi Yamada and Takada. He held the title until December 27, losing it to the debuting Hiroshi Hase. In 1988, he had numerous encounters with Shiro Koshinaka over the IWGP Junior Heavyweight Championship, but he came up short on retrieving what was once his. In spite of rivaling with the champion, he and Koshinaka started to team up in tag team and six-man matches. In April 1989, he served as the first opponent of Jyushin Liger (Keiichi Yamada's first match under the Liger persona), in a losing effort at the Tokyo Dome. In 1990, he moved up to the heavyweight division, and joined the New Japan Sekigun against the Blond Outlaws. In 1992, he and Shiro Koshinaka formed the Heisei Ishingun, while feuding with two karatekas in Masashi Aoyagi and Akitoshi Saito. In the middle of the feud, Kobayashi went on a leave of absence.

Upon his return in February 1993, Kobayashi reunited with Koshinaka, who had now formed a stable with Aoyagi, Saito and Kengo Kimura. The stable would feud with wrestlers from WAR. In February 1996, Kobayashi lost a hair vs. hair match to Akira Nogami. Kobayashi underwent another lengthy hiatus in February 1999. In April 2000, Kobayashi wrestled his final match as an active wrestler, losing to Jyushin Thunder Liger. After the bout, he received flowers from Satoru Sayama and a message from Mitsuharu Misawa, as both Tiger Masks sent their farewell sayings to their biggest rival.

After his retirement, Kobayashi served as color commentator and trainer at the NJPW Dojo. He made sporadic appearances, however, one being in May 2003, in a New Japan Alumnus battle royal, won by Kantaro Hoshino and Kotetsu Yamamoto. Another appearance of his occurred on was on March 6, 2007, when he served as special guest referee for an eight-man tag team match between El Texano Jr., Minoru, Tiger Mask and Wataru Inoue against El Samurai, Jushin Thunder Liger, Koji Kanemoto and Negro Casas, in which after the match, Kobayashi attacked Liger and delivered his signature fisherman suplex.

== Retirement ==
Upon his retirement, Kobayashi remained involved in puroresu, including as caretaker of the NJPW Dojo. He occasionally wrestled in legends matches, including a series of matches in 2011 against Sayama and a team with him in 2013 against Atsushi Onita (who led the AJPW junior heavyweight division in 1983, before Kobayashi showed up). He would also do color commentary for NJPW shows.

On January 4, 2017, Kobayashi made a special appearance for NJPW, taking part in the New Japan Rumble on the pre-show of Wrestle Kingdom 11 in Tokyo Dome. He was eliminated from the match by Tiger Mask.

== Professional wrestling style and persona ==
Kobayashi wrestled in a "technician" style. His signature moves included the fisherman suplex, sliding kick, spin kick, and thrust kick. He was nicknamed "Tiger Hunter".

== Health and death ==
In July 1992, Kobayashi was diagnosed with colon cancer. He underwent surgery, in which 20 centimeters of large intestine was removed. He would spend six months recuperating, before returning to the ring in February 1993. After wrestling on NJPW's Fighting Spirit tour in February 1999, Kobayashi's cancer had metastasized to his liver. He underwent surgery to remove part of his liver, but the surgery left him with a 70 centimeter surgical scar on his abdomen. The liver cancer and recovery forced Kobayashi to retire from active competition in April 2000.

After retirement, the cancer had spread to his lungs twice and underwent successful endoscopic surgery each time. Kobayashi had been undergoing anti-cancer treatment, including undergoing a PET scan once a year, but had not taken any medication. In February 2024, Kobayashi was diagnosed with pancreatic cancer. The diagnosis was kept a secret except for a select few. Five days before his death, Osamu Nishimura, who was battling stage-four esophageal cancer before passing in February 2025, visited Kobayashi at his home to pay his respects to his old friend.

After 32 years of fighting various cancers, Kobayashi died from pancreatic cancer on 9 September 2024, at the age of 68.

== Championships and accomplishments ==
- All Japan Pro Wrestling
  - NWA International Junior Heavyweight Championship (1 time)
  - World Junior Heavyweight Championship (1 time)
- New Japan Pro-Wrestling
  - IWGP Junior Heavyweight Championship (1 time)
  - Greatest Wrestlers (Class of 2009)
- NWA Hollywood Wrestling
  - NWA Americas Heavyweight Championship (1 time)
- Pro Wrestling Illustrated
  - PWI ranked him #256 of the 500 best singles wrestlers during the PWI Years in 2003.
- Tokyo Sports
  - Effort Award (1978)
  - Service Award (2000)
- Wrestling Observer Newsletter
  - Match of the Year (1985) vs. Tiger Mask II on June 12

== Luchas de Apuestas record ==
Winner (wager)	Loser (wager)	Location	Event	Date	Notes
Gran Hamada, Enrique Vera and Kobayashi (hair)	Los Misioneros de la Muerte (hair) (El Signo, El Texano and Negro Navarro)	Mexico City	UWA show	June 7, 1981	
Kobayashi and Saito (hair)	Coloso Colosetti and César Valentino (hair)	Naucalpan, Mexico State	UWA show	September 25, 1981	
Los Misioneros de la Muerte (hair) (El Signo, El Texano and Negro Navarro)	Takano, Saito and Kobayashi (hair)	Mexico City	UWA show	June 13, 1982	
Kuniaki Kobayashi (hair)	Magic Dragon (mask)	Nagoya, Aichi, Japan	AJPW 85 Gekishin! Thunder Wars - Day 18	June 5, 1985	
Akira Nogami (hair)	Kuniaki Kobayashi (hair)	Sapporo, Hokkaido, Japan	NJPW Fighting Spirit 1996 - Day 2	February 3, 1996	

== Mixed martial arts exhibition record ==
Exhibition record breakdown		
1 match	0 wins	1 loss
By knockout	0	1

Res.	Record	Opponent	Method	Event	Date	Round	Time	Location	Notes
Loss	0–1	Satoru Sayama	KO (high kick)	Shooto: Vale Tudo Perception	September 26, 1995	1	6:05	Tokyo, Japan	
