= Black Man (wrestler) =

Mexican professional wrestler (1949–2022)

Personal information
- Born: Álvaro Meléndez Tibanez; February 19, 1949 Guadalajara, Jalisco, Mexico
- Died: February 28, 2022 (aged 73)

Professional wrestling career
- Ring names: Black Man; Celestial; La Gacela; Spiderman
- Billed height: 168 cm (5 ft 6 in)
- Billed weight: 86 kg (190 lb)
- Trained by: Diablo Velasco
- Debut: 1965
- Retired: March 13, 1993

Álvaro Meléndez Tibanez (February 19, 1949 – February 28, 2022) was a Mexican professional wrestler better known as Black Man. He was considered a very talented wrestler, and innovative when it comes to high flying moves.

Tibanez died on February 28, 2022, aged 73.

== Professional wrestling career ==
He is most known for a being part of a tag team, first with White Man, Alberto Muñoz, who formed a fan favorite tag team. The two teamed for a while but never won a tag team title, despite several chances at the Arena Coliseo Tag Team Championship. By 1978 Muñoz dropped the "White Man" character as he was forced to work a reduced schedule due to age and injuries.

Later, Black Man would form Los Fantasticos with Kung Fu and Kato Kung Lee, a very popular trios team from the early 1980s. Black Man would later try to reform Los Fantasticos with Kendo and Avispon Negro, but the trio was never as popular as the originals. He was once El Santo's high risk move double in a movie. Late in his career he worked under the ring name Celestial, complete with a new mask and outfit to not reveal his real identity.

== Championships and accomplishments ==
- Universal Wrestling Association
  - UWA World Lightweight Championship (1 time)
  - UWA World Trios Championship (1 time) – with Kung Fu and Kato Kung Lee
  - UWA World Welterweight Championship (3 times)

== Luchas de Apuestas record ==
Winner (wager)	Loser (wager)	Location	Event	Date	Notes
Dr. O'Borman (mask)	Spiderman (mask)	Tijuana, Baja California	Live event	1966	
Black Man (mask)	Demonio Azul (mask)	N/A	Live event	April 7, 1977	(Note: Not Blue Demon)
Black Man and El Matemático (masks)	El Signo and Lobo Rubio (hair)	Naucalpan, State of Mexico	Live event	January 20, 1978	
Black Man (mask)	Pantera Negra (hair)	Pachuca, Hidalgo	Live event	October 2, 1983	
Blue Panther and Black Man (masks)	Las Sombras de Plata (masks)	Naucalpan, State of Mexico	Live event	November 20, 1984	
Blue Panther (mask)	Black Man (mask)	Naucalpan, State of Mexico	Live event	February 16, 1986	
El Brazo (hair)	Black Man (hair)	Naucalpan, State of Mexico	Live event	February 7, 1990	
Black Man (hair)	Black Terry (hair)	Querétaro, Querétaro	Live event	October 30, 1990	
Negro Casas (hair)	Black Man (hair)	Nezahualcoyotl, State of Mexico	Live event	February 5, 1991	
Celestial (mask)	Demonio Arrieta (hair)	Mexico City	Live event	June 4, 1992	
Celestial (mask)	Pólvora (mask)	Querétaro, Querétaro	Live event	August 11, 1992	(Note: Not the current wrestler working as Pólvora.)
Super Delfin (mask)	Black Man (mask)	Tokyo, Japan	Live event	March 13, 1993	(Note: Remasked as Black Man to lose the mask in Japan.)
