= UWA World Welterweight Championship =

Mexican wrestling championship

- The original championship belt

Details
- Promotion: Universal Wrestling Association; Mexican independent circuit Japanese Independent circuit
- Date established: December 14, 1975
- Date retired: October 14, 2004
Statistics
- First champion: Villano III
- Final champion: Takeshi Minamino
- Most reigns: Black Man / Celestial (3 times)
- Longest reign: Super Crazy (851 days)

The UWA World Welterweight Championship is a championship in professional wrestling that is primarily contested for in various Lucha Libre promotions in Mexico. In 1993, the championship was recognized by the Japanese professional wrestling promotion Michinoku Pro, following Super Delfin's victory over then champion Celestial. In 1995, Gran Hamada was stripped of the championship, because he exceeded the weight limit. The championship returned to being primarily contested for in Mexico, and it wasn't until Taiji Ishimori's victory over Super Crazy in 2003 that a Japanese wrestler would hold the championship again.

As it was a professional wrestling championship, the championship was not won not by actual competition, but by a scripted ending to a match determined by the bookers and match makers. (Note: Hornbaker (2016) p. 550: "Professional wrestling is a sport in which match finishes are predetermined. Thus, win–loss records are not indicative of a wrestler's genuine success based on their legitimate abilities – but on now much, or how little they were pushed by promoters") On occasion the promotion declares a championship vacant, which means there is no champion at that point in time. This can either be due to a storyline, (Note: Duncan & Will (2000) p. 271, Chapter: Texas: NWA American Tag Team Title [World Class, Adkisson] "Championship held up and rematch ordered because of the interference of manager Gary Hart") or real life issues such as a champion suffering an injury being unable to defend the championship, (Note: Duncan & Will (2000) p. 20, Chapter: (United States: 19th Century & widely defended titles – NWA, WWF, AWA, IW, ECW, NWA) NWA/WCW TV Title "Rhodes stripped on 85/10/19 for not defending the belt after having his leg broken by Ric Flair and Ole & Arn Anderson") or leaving the company. (Note: Duncan & Will (2000) p. 201, Chapter: (Memphis, Nashville) Memphis: USWA Tag Team Title "Vacant on 93/01/18 when Spike leaves the USWA.")

== Title history ==
Key
| No. | Overall reign number |
| Reign | Reign number for the specific champion |
| Days | Number of days held |
| N/A | Unknown information |
| † | Championship change is unrecognized by the promotion |
| + | Current reign is changing daily |

| No. | Champion | Championship change | | | Reign statistics | | Notes | Ref. |
| No. | Champion | Date | Event | Location | Reign | Days | Notes | Ref. |
|---|---|---|---|---|---|---|---|---|
| 1 | Villano III | December 14, 1975 | Live event | Mexico City | 1 | 532 | Defeated Huracán Ramírez to become the first UWA World Welterweight Champion. | |
| 2 | El Solar | May 29, 1977 | Live event | Mexico City | 1 | 413 | | |
| 3 | Bobby Lee | July 16, 1978 | Plaza de Toros UWA Show | Monterrey, Nuevo León | 1 | 343 | | |
| 4 | El Signo | June 24, 1979 | Live event | Tijuana, Baja California | 1 | 294 | | |
| 5 | Garringo | April 13, 1980 | Live event | Monterrey, Nuevo León | 1 | 147 | | |
| 6 | El Texano | September 7, 1980 | Live event | Mexico City | 1 | 521 | | |
| — | Vacated | February 10, 1982 | — | — | — | — | The Championship was vacated for undocumented reasons. | |
| 7 | Lobo Rubio | May 30, 1982 | Live event | Mexico City | 1 | 140 | Defeated El Matematico to win the championship. | |
| 8 | El Matematico | October 17, 1982 | Live event | Mexico City | 1 | 791 | | |
| 9 | Blue Panther | December 16, 1984 | UWA Carnaval de Campeones | Mexico City | 1 | 420 | | |
| 10 | Black Man | February 9, 1986 | Live event | Mexico City | 1 | 571 | | |
| 11 | Ray Richard | September 3, 1987 | Live event | Mexico City | 1 | 330 | | |
| 12 | Yoshihiro Asai | July 29, 1988 | Live event | Mexico City | 1 | 103 | | |
| 13 | Charles Lucero | November 9, 1988 | Live event | Monterrey, Nuevo León | 1 | 534 | | |
| 14 | El Hijo del Santo | April 27, 1990 | Live event | Monterrey, Nuevo León | 1 | 746 | | |
| 15 | Espanto Jr. | May 12, 1992 | Live event | Monterrey, Nuevo León | 1 | 44 | | |
| 16 | Celestial | June 25, 1992 | Live event | Monterrey, Nuevo León | 2 | 326 | Previously held the championship under the name "Black Man" | |
| 17 | Super Delfin | May 17, 1993 | Live event | Tokyo, Japan | 1 | 68 | | |
| 18 | Great Sasuke | July 24, 1993 | Live event | Moioka, Japan | 1 | 31 | | |
| 19 | Super Delfin | August 24, 1993 | Live event | Tokyo, Japan | 2 | 4 | | |
| 20 | Celestial | August 28, 1993 | Live event | Mexico City | 3 | 155 | | |
| 21 | Karloff Lagarde Jr. | January 30, 1994 | Live event | Naucalpan, México | 1 | 115 | | |
| 22 | El Hijo del Santo | May 25, 1994 | Live event | Tlalnepantla de Baz | 2 | 177 | | |
| 23 | Norio Honaga | November 18, 1994 | Live event | Hiroshima, Japan | 1 | 25 | | |
| 24 | Shinjiro Otani | December 13, 1994 | Live event | Osaka, Japan | 1 | 124 | | |
| 25 | Koji Kanemoto | April 16, 1995 | Live event | Hiroshima, Japan | 1 | 159 | | |
| 26 | Gran Hamada | September 22, 1995 | Live event | Nagoya, Japan | 1 | 52 | | |
| — | Vacated | | — | — | — | — | Gran Hamada is stripped of the championship, after exceeding the weight limit. The UWA Closed shortly afterwards | |
| † | Super Crazy | November 17, 1995 | Live event | Nezahualcóyotl, Mexico State | 1 | (Note: The exact date in October 1997 where Kid Guzmán won the championship has not been documented. Which means that the title reign lasted between 411 and 775 days.) | It is unclear how the physical UWA World Welterweight Championship belt returned to Mexico. Super Crazy defeated Rey Bucanero to win the vacant championship | |
| † | Kid Guzmán | October 1997 | Live event | Nezahualcóyotl, Mexico State | 1 | (Note: The exact date in October 1997 where Kid Guzmán won the championship has not been documented. Which means that the title reign lasted between 227 and 257 days.) | | |
| † | Super Crazy | June 15, 1998 | Live event | Hakata, Japan | 2 | 851 | | |
| † | El Oriental | October 13, 2000 | Live event | Torreon, Mexico | 1 | 111 | | |
| — | Vacated | February 1, 2001 | — | — | — | — | El Oriental was stripped of the Championship due to injury. | |
| † | Nemesis | September 23, 2001 | Live event | Tulancingo, Hidalgo | 1 | 203 | Teamed with Crazy Boy and Rey Cuvero against El Impostor, El Cazador and Poder Gitano, captain of the team won the championship. | |
| † | Rey Cuervo | April 14, 2002 | Live event | Tulancingo, Hidalgo | 1 | 1115 | | |
| — | Vacated | May 3, 2003 | — | — | — | — | | |
| † | Taiji Ishimori | May 11, 2003 | Live event | Mexico City | 1 | 476 | Defeated Super Crazy to win the vacant championship | |
| — | Vacated | August 29, 2004 | — | — | — | — | The Championship was held up, after an inconclusive match against Takeshi Minamino | |
| † | Takeshi Minamino | September 9, 2004 | Live event | Tokyo, Japan | 1 | 35 | Defeated Pineapple Hanai and Mango Fukuda to win the vacant championship | |
| — | Deactivated | October 14, 2004 | — | — | — | — | The Championship was vacated and later abandoned | |
