= UWA World Junior Heavyweight Championship =

UWA Junior Heavyweight Championship

Details
- Promotion: UWA (1982–1995); WWC (1997–2001); IWA (2001–2002); Independent circuit (2013-2014); Tenryu Project (2014–2016); Freedoms (2016–2022); Fight of the Ring (2023–2026); Eagle Pro Wrestling (2026–present)
- Date established: 1982
- Current champion: Katsunari Toi
- Date won: October 11, 2026

Other name
- Unified World Junior Heavyweight Championship (February 24, 2001 - February 26, 2002)
Statistics
- First champion: El Solitario
- Most reigns: Enrique Vera/The Killer/Super Crazy/Lobo/Yuya Susumu (3 times)
- Longest reign: The Wolf (819 days)
- Shortest reign: Crash Holly (1 day)

The UWA World Junior Heavyweight Championship (Japanese: UWA世界ジュニアヘビー級王座, Hepburn: UWA Sekai Junia Hebī-kyū Ōza) is a title that was originally promoted by the Mexican lucha libre promotion Universal Wrestling Association. After the UWA closed in 1995 the title was defended on the Mexican independent circuit and in the Puerto Rican promotion World Wrestling Council. In 2014, the title was revived by Japanese promotion Tenryu Project. In 2016, the title moved to the Pro Wrestling Freedoms promotion. The weight range for this championship was 97 kg (214 lb) to 107 kg (236 lb).

As it is a professional wrestling championship, the championship is not won not by actual competition, but by a scripted ending to a match determined by the bookers and match makers. (Note: Hornbaker (2016) p. 550: "Professional wrestling is a sport in which match finishes are predetermined. Thus, win–loss records are not indicative of a wrestler's genuine success based on their legitimate abilities – but on now much, or how little they were pushed by promoters") On occasion the promotion declares a championship vacant, which means there is no champion at that point in time. This can either be due to a storyline, (Note: Duncan & Will (2000) p. 271, Chapter: Texas: NWA American Tag Team Title [World Class, Adkisson] "Championship held up and rematch ordered because of the interference of manager Gary Hart") or real life issues such as a champion suffering an injury being unable to defend the championship, (Note: Duncan & Will (2000) p. 20, Chapter: (United States: 19th Century & widely defended titles – NWA, WWF, AWA, IW, ECW, NWA) NWA/WCW TV Title "Rhodes stripped on 85/10/19 for not defending the belt after having his leg broken by Ric Flair and Ole & Arn Anderson") or leaving the company. (Note: Duncan & Will (2000) p. 201, Chapter: (Memphis, Nashville) Memphis: USWA Tag Team Title "Vacant on 93/01/18 when Spike leaves the USWA.")

There have been a total of 49 reigns and five vacancies shared between 33 different champions. The title is currently held by Katsunari Toi.

== Title history ==
Key
No.	Overall reign number
Reign	Reign number for the specific champion
Days	Number of days held
N/A	Unknown information
(NLT)	Championship change took place "no later than" the date listed
†	Championship change is unrecognized by the promotion
+	Current reign is changing daily

No.	Champion	Championship change			Reign statistics		Notes	Ref.
No.	Champion	Date	Event	Location	Reign	Days	Notes	Ref.
Universal Wrestling Association
1	El Solitario	1982 (NLT)	N/A	N/A	1	(Note: Due to sparse record keeping in Mexico at the time, no documentation of the date the championship changed hands is found and is too uncertain to calculate.)		(Note: Duncan & Will (2000) p. 397, Chapter: MEXICO: UWA World Junior Heavyweight Title [Flores, Mora])
Championship history is unrecorded from 1982 to 1983.
2	Enrique Vera	1983 (NLT)	N/A	N/A	1			
Championship history is unrecorded from 1983 to August 14, 1988.
3	The Killer	August 14, 1988	Live event	Mexico City, Distrito Federal	1	31		
4	Enrique Vera	September 14, 1988	Live event	Mexico City, Distrito Federal	2	312		
5	The Killer	July 23, 1989	Live event	Mexico City, Distrito Federal	2	217		
6	Astro de Oro	February 25, 1990	Live event	Guatemala	1	84		
7	Dr. Wagner Jr.	May 20, 1990	Live event	Guatemala	1	56		
8	Astro de Oro	July 15, 1990	Live event	Mexico City, Distrito Federal	2	7		
9	Dr. Wagner Jr.	July 22, 1990	Live event	Naucalpan, Mexico	2	218		
10	Enrique Vera	February 25, 1991	Live event	Puebla, Mexico	3	349		
11	The Killer	February 9, 1992	Live event	Naucalpan, Mexico	3	133		
12	Villano III	June 21, 1992	Live event	Naucalpan, Mexico	1	47		
13	Shu El Guerrero	August 7, 1992	Live event	Nezahualcóyotl, Mexico	1	507		
14	Negro Navarro	December 27, 1993	Live event	Puebla, Mexico	1	(Note: The date of at least one of the title changes in this reign is uncertain, which means that the reign lasted between 370 and 734 days.)		
—	Vacated	1995 (NLT)	—	—	—	—	Title vacated when Navarro left the promotion to join PROMELL.	
15	Mr. Jack	June 30, 1995	Live event	Nezahualcóyotl, Mexico	1			
Championship history is unrecorded from June 30, 1995 to September 1995.
16	Aero Flash	September 1995 (NLT)	Live event	N/A	1			
Championship history is unrecorded from September 1995 to 1997.
Mexican indies / World Wrestling Council
17	Blue Demon Jr.	1997 (NLT)	Live event	Panama	1		Defeated Black Demon, unclear if it was a title defense or if Black Demon was the champion.	
18	Pablo Márquez	N/A	N/A	N/A	1			
Championship history is unrecorded from 1997 to October 1999.
19	El Alebrije	October 1999 (NLT)	Live event	N/A	1			
Championship history is unrecorded from October 1999 to February 9, 2001.
International Wrestling Association (Puerto Rico)
20	Pablo Márquez	February 9, 2001	Live event	N/A	2	15		
21	Super Crazy	February 24, 2001	Live event	Bayamón, Puerto Rico	1	287	This was a title vs. title match for Super Crazy's IWA World Junior Heavyweight Championship.	
22	Lobo	April 21, 2001	N/A	Carolina, Puerto Rico	1	63	This title change is not recognized by Freedoms.	
23	Super Crazy	June 23, 2001	N/A	Bayamón, Puerto Rico	2	34	This title change is not recognized by Freedoms.	
24	Crash Holly	July 27, 2001	N/A	Bayamón, Puerto Rico	1	1	This title change is not recognized by Freedoms.	
25	Super Crazy	July 28, 2001	N/A	Carolina, Puerto Rico	3	126	This was a 3-way match for the IWA Hardcore and the IWA/UWA Unified World Junior Heavyweight titles also involving Lobo. This title change is not recognized by Freedoms.	
—	Vacated	December 1, 2001	—	—	—	—	The IWA general manager Savio Vega stripped Super Crazy of the IWA/UWA Unified World Junior Heavyweight Titles.	
25	Lobo	December 8, 2001	Live event	Orocovis, Puerto Rico	2	29	Defeated Minoru Fujita to win the vacant IWA/UWA Unified World Junior Heavyweight titles.	
27	Minoru Fujita	January 6, 2002	Live event	Bayamón, Puerto Rico	1	27		
28	Lobo	February 6, 2002	Live event	Bayamón, Puerto Rico	3	20	This title change is not recognized by Freedoms.	
—	Vacated	February 26, 2002	—	—	—	—	Title stripped by the IWA general manager Savio Vega.	
—	Deactivated	July 16, 2002 (NLT)	—	—	—	—	Title deactivated. Meanwhile, the IWA World Junior Heavyweight Championship is unified with the IWA World Junior Heavyweight Championship.	
Japanese indies
29	Nagase Kancho	April 4, 2013	Live event	Tokyo, Japan	1	301	Defeated Black Tiger V to revive the title.	
—	Vacated	January 30, 2014	—	—	—	—	Title vacated due to Kancho being unable to defend it.	
Tenryu Project
30	Kengo	March 4, 2014	Live event	Tokyo, Japan	1	510	Defeated Dragon Joker to win the vacant title.	
—	Vacated	July 27, 2015	—	—	—	—	Title vacated due to Kengo suffering an injury.	
31	Kotaro Nasu	September 2, 2015	Genichiro Tenryu Retirement	Tokyo, Japan	1	252	Defeated Dragon Joker to win the vacant title.	
Pro Wrestling Freedoms
32	The Winger	May 11, 2016	Live event	Tokyo, Japan	1	92		
33	Gentaro	August 11, 2016	Unchain Night!	Tokyo, Japan	1	98		
34	Miedo Extremo	November 17, 2016	The Winger Pro-Wrestling 25th Anniversary	Tokyo, Japan	1	20		
35	Gentaro	December 7, 2016	Road To Blood X'Mas 2016	Tokyo, Japan	2	146		
36	Yuya Susumu	May 2, 2017	We Love Freedoms! We Are Freedoms! 2017	Tokyo, Japan	1	365		
37	"brother" Yasshi	May 2, 2018	We Love Freedoms! We Are Freedoms! 2018	Tokyo, Japan	1	138		
38	Yuya Susumu	September 17, 2018	Pro-Wrestling Freedoms 9th Anniversary Memorial Conference	Tokyo, Japan	2	108		
39	Kenichiro Arai	January 3, 2019	Happy New Freedom 2019	Tokyo, Japan	1	271		
40	Yuya Susumu	October 1, 2019	Freedoms 10th Anniversary Celebration	Tokyo, Japan	3	335		
41	Kamui	August 31, 2020	Tokyo Death Match Carnival 2020 Vol. 2	Tokyo, Japan	1	204		
42	Brahman Kei	March 23, 2021	The Gekokujo 2021	Tokyo, Japan	1	12		
43	Kamui	April 4, 2021	Freedoms	Osaka, Japan	2	31		
44	Tatsuhito Takaiwa	May 5, 2021	Yokohama Pro-Wrestling Festival 2021	Yokohama, Japan	1	363		
45	Kengo	May 3, 2022	Hot Free People 2022	Yokohama, Japan	2	60		
—	Vacated	July 2, 2022	—	—	—	—	Title vacated due to Kengo suffering an injury.	
Fight of the Ring
46	Hiroshi Yamato	January 22, 2023	Fight Of The Ring	Tokyo, Japan	1	448	Defeated The Wolf in the final of a four-man tournament to win the vacant title.	
47	The Wolf	April 14, 2024	Fight Of The Ring	Tokyo, Japan	1	819	This was also for The Wolf's Latin American Championship.	
Eagle Pro Wrestling
48	Kazunori Yoshida	July 12, 2026	EAGLE	Oyama, Tochigi, Japan	1	91		
Fight of the Ring
49	Katsunari Toi	October 11, 2026	Fight Of The Ring	Tokyo, Japan	1	20+		

=== Combined reigns ===
As of October 31, 2026.

†	Indicates the current champion
¤	The exact length of the title reign is uncertain.

Rank	Wrestler	No. of reigns	Combined days
1	The Wolf	1	819
2	Yuya Susumu	3	808
3	Enrique Vera	3	661¤
4	Kengo	2	570
5	Shu El Guerrero	1	507
6	Hiroshi Yamato	1	448
7	Super Crazy	3	447
8	The Killer	3	381
9	Tatsuhito Takaiwa	1	363
10	Nagase Kancho	1	301
11	Dr. Wagner Jr.	2	274
12	Kenichiro Arai	1	271
13	Kotaro Nasu	1	252
14	Gentaro	2	244
15	Kamui	2	235
16	"brother" Yasshi	1	138
17	Lobo	3	112
18	The Winger	1	94
19	Astro de Oro	2	91
19	Kazunori Yoshida	1	91
21	Villano III	1	47
22	Minoru Fujita	1	27
23	Katsunari Toi †	1	20+
24	Miedo Extremo	1	20
25	Pablo Marquez	2	15¤
26	Brahman Kei	1	12
27	Crash Holly	1	1
28	Aero Flash	1	N/A¤
28	Blue Demon Jr.	1	N/A¤
28	El Alebrije	1	N/A¤
28	El Solitario	1	N/A¤
28	Mr. Jack	1	N/A¤
28	Negro Navarro	1	N/A¤
