= El Texano =

Mexican professional wrestler (1958–2006)

Personal information
- Born: Juan Conrado Aguilar Jáuregui; November 26, 1958 Mexicali, Baja California, Mexico
- Died: 15 January 2006 (aged 47) Guadalajara, Jalisco, Mexico

Professional wrestling career
- Ring name(s): Billy The Kid; El Texano; El Vaquero; Johnny Texas; Juan El Texano; Roy Navarro; Silver King II
- Billed height: 1.70 m (5 ft 7 in)
- Billed weight: 95 kg (209 lb)
- Trained by: Antonio Cruz; Diablo Velasco
- Debut: February 1, 1972

Juan Conrado Aguilar Jáuregui (November 26, 1958 – January 15, 2006), better known by his ring name El Texano, was a Mexican professional wrestler. From the early 1970s to the early 2000s, he wrestled under masked and unmasked monikers for various promotions including Universal Wrestling Association (UWA), World Wrestling Council (WWC), World Class Championship Wrestling (WCCW), and World Championship Wrestling (WCW), Consejo Mundial de Lucha Libre (CMLL) and Asistencia Asesoría y Administración (AAA). His son Juan Aguilar Leos wrestles under the name El Texano, Jr. in tribute to his father and another son wrestles as the masked Super Nova.

During his professional wrestling career Aguilar helped popularize the concept of the Trios match (teams of three facing off in a tag team match) in Mexico, as a part of Los Misioneros de la Muerte ("The Missionaries of Death"; Texano, El Signo and Negro Navarro). He also worked for an extensive period of time with Silver King, collectively known as Los Cowboys, working both in Japan and the United States, achieving notoriety outside of his native Mexico.

== Personal life ==
Juan Aguilar was born and raised in Mexicali, Baja California, Mexico but would later move to Guadalajara, Jalisco, Mexico where he lived until his death. Aguilar and his Guadalajara native wife had three sons together, two of whom became professional wrestlers, Juan Aguilar Leos who works under the ring name El Texano, Jr. and Super Nova, who is an enmascarado (Masked wrestler) and thus his birth name is not publicized. He is the uncle of professional wrestlers Jonathan de Jesus Navarro Jímenez (works under the name Mictlán), Juan Miguel Escalante Grande (known as Inquisidor) and Pólvora (enmascarado). He is the cousin of professional wrestler Roberto Gutiérrez Frías, better known as El Dandy.

== Professional wrestling career ==
Aguilar began training for a career in professional wrestling at a very early age after receiving his parents' consent to do so. He made his wrestling debut on February 1, 1972, at the age of 13. In Mexico becoming a professional wrestler at such a young age is rare, but not unheard of if parental consent is given. (Note: Rey Mysterio made his in-ring about the same age as Aguilar, 13 years of age.) He made his debut as an enmascarado (masked wrestler) using the ring name "Billy the Kid", portraying a Cowboy character. Aguilar continued to train under Antonio Cruz in the years following his debut as he worked under a number of different masked characters such as Roy Navarro, El Vaquero ("The Cowboy"), Juan El Texano and Johnny Texas. After working primarily in and around his native state of Baja California he started making appearances in Mexico City around 1975, working for Empresa Mexicana de Lucha Libre (EMLL), the world's oldest and one of Mexico's biggest professional wrestling promotions. During one show in Arena Coliseo, EMLL's secondary venue, a lucha libre magazine writer suggested he should simply work as "El Texano" ("The Texan"), a ring name Aguilar used from that point on until his death. While working for EMLL he also began training with Guadalajara, Jalisco based wrestling trainer Cuauhtémoc "Diablo" Velasco, one of the most famous professional wrestling trainers in Mexico.

=== Los Misioneros de la Muerte ===
In the late 1970s Aguilar, as El Texano, began working for EMLL's biggest rival the Universal Wrestling Association (UWA) as they wanted to feature more wrestlers in the lighter divisions to strengthen their shows. UWA promoter Francisco Flores wanted to build some of the lesser known lightweights into high card workers and decided to build a storyline between the masked El Texano and the recently debut Brazo de Oro ("Golden Hand"), which later expanded to include Brazo de Oro's younger brothers Brazo de Plata ("Silver Arm") and El Brazo ("The Arm"). The Brazo brothers were given the team name Los Mosqueteros de Diablo (The Devil's Musketeers) while El Texano began teaming with Antonio Sánchez Rendón, known under the ring name El Signo ("The Sign") and Miguel Navarro, better known as Negro Navarro. The team was dubbed Los Misioneros de la Muerte ("The Missionaries of Death"). Early on in the storyline Brazo de Oro defeated El Texano in a Luchas de Apuestas, or bet match, which forced El Texano to unmask. The storyline expanded and saw the unmasked Misionaros clash with the masked Mosqueteros on UWA promoted cards all over Mexico. The fan reception to those matches and the positive coverage in various Lucha Libre magazines was so big that other promoters around Mexico wanted to book them on their shows, not as individuals but as teams, which was the start of the trios match becoming more and more prominent in Lucha Libre. With the team being so in demand UWA started to feature Los Misioneros more often, including El Signo winning the UWA World Welterweight Championship, a title he would later lose to El Gringo, who in turn would lose the belt to El Texano in order to legitimize him as a wrestler. By 1981 Los Misioneros began working high on the card, often working the main event match starting a trend of having trios matches instead of singles matches as the regular main event match format, something that helped make that match format the most common match type in Lucha Libre since then.

In 1981 the Los Misioneros de la Muerte name became a household name after a match in El Toreo de Quatro Caminos ("The Bullring with four corners"), UWA's main venue. During the main event Los Misioneros faced off against then 64-year-old El Santo, teaming with Huracán Ramírez and Rayo de Jalisco. In that match El Santo collapsed in the middle of the ring, suffering a heart attack during the match. His life was only saved due to the quick witted actions of Ramírez. After the match the Lucha Libre magazine, prompted by Francisco Flores, played off the real life tragedy by promoting Los Misioneros as the team that nearly killed the biggest name in Lucha Libre ever. The event made the team the most hated trio in Mexico for years to come and helped fill El Torero arena to the brim when Los Misioneros teamed up with Perro Aguayo to face El Santo, Gory Guerrero, Huracán Ramírez and El Solitario in El Santo's retirement match. Following Santo's retirement Los Misioneros feuded with the top faces (wrestlers portraying "good guy" characters) such as Los Tres Caballero (Aníbal, El Solitario and Villano III both in trios and in individual competition. At one point Villano III defeated El Texano in a Luchas de Apuestas match, forcing El Texano to be shaved bald as a result of the loss. During the storyline El Solitario turned on his two partners, when he attacked El Signo with a bottle and costing Los Tres Caballeros an important match. The attack made the smaller Los Misioneros more sympathetic to the crowd, who began to support them more and more despite Los Misioneros being booked on the shows as the heels ("bad guy" characters). Their popularity as a trio also led to them being invited to tour Japan, facing off against New Japan Pro-Wrestling (NJPW) light weight wrestlers such as Gran Hamada, Tiger Mask, George Takano, Akira Maeda and Osamu Kido. In 1984 Los Misioneros won the UWA World Trios Championship for the first time, although it is not documented for exactly how long. In the mid-1980s the "War" between the UWA and EMLL had cooled off enough for Los Misionerios to actually wrestle on the EMLL 53rd Anniversary Show, losing a trios Luchas de Apuestas to Ringo Mendoza, Américo Rocca and Tony Salazar. Los Misionerios regained the UWA World Trios Championship in 1987 defeating Los Villanos (Villano III, Villano IV and Villano V), after what was considered the "peak" of Los Misionerios. With an influx of other popular trios both in the UWA and in Mexico in general Los Misioneros days on the top of the Trios scene came to an end, which was followed by the end of Los Missioneros de la Muerte in its original form. During a UWA World Trios Championship match against Los Villanos El Texano threw in the towel to save his partner El Signo any more punishment. After the match and title loss his partners turned on El Texano and attacked him after the match. The attack was done primarily to write El Texano out of the UWA storyline as he had given notice that he was leaving.

=== Los Cowboys ===
El Texano left the UWA and joined rival EMLL where he began working both as a singles wrestler and as a regular tag team with his cousin El Dandy, collectively known as Los Vaqueros or simply as Los Cowboys. Later on El Texano began teaming with Silver King, replacing El Dandy as one of Los Cowboys. Los Cowboys began working for other promotions than just EMLL both inside and outside of Mexico, which led them to work for various international promotions such as International Wrestling Association both in Japan and Puerto Rico as well as working the UWA. In 1991 the team won their first tag team championship together, winning a tournament to become the first ever World Wrestling Association (WWA) World Tag Team Championship. On January 19, 1992, they added the UWA World Tag Team Championship to their collection when they defeated Gran Hamada and Kendo for the titles on a show in Japan and brought the titles back to Mexico.

At the time of their run as double tag team champions the US based World Championship Wrestling (WCW) was looking for international tag teams to compete in a tournament for the vacant National Wrestling Alliance (NWA) World Tag Team Champions and selected Los Cowboys to represent Mexico. The team faced off against The Fabulous Freebirds (Michael Hayes and Jimmy Garvin) in the first round of the tournament. The match took place at the Clash of the Champions XIX, which had El Texano billed as "Silver King II", was won by the Freebirds, marking the first and only time Los Cowboys worked for WCW. Texano and Silver King lost the UWA World Tag Team Championship to the masked duo known as The Can-Am Express (I and II) on June 28, 1992, as part of a longer-running storyline between the two teams. Three weeks later Los Cowboys defeated the Can-Am Express in a tag team Luchas de Apuestas match and forced the team to unmask to reveal their true identities of Doug Furnas and Dan Kroffat. On November 11, 1992, El Texano became the UWA World Light Heavyweight Champion, a title he would later lose to his partner Silver King. on July 7, 1993, Los Cowboys lost the WWA World Tag team titles to El Dandy and Corazon de Leon but regained them two months later. Their second run with the WWA World Tag Team titles only lasted a month as Villano IV and Villano V won the titles from them on October 10, 1993, 39 days later. El Texano had a brief reunion with Los Misioneros as they won the UWA World Trios Championship in 1993 and held it for 155, but failed to recapture the fans' attention like their original run had. By the end of 1994 Los Cowboys returned to EMLL, now renamed Consejo Mundial de Lucha Libre (CMLL) and began a long-running storyline with the tag team known as The Headhunters that resulted in a series of brutal and blood filled brawls between the two teams. On December 16, 1994 Los Cowboys won the CMLL World Tag Team Championship when they defeated Defeated El Satánico and Emilio Charles, Jr. in the finals of a 32-team tournament for the vacant tag team titles. Six months later the feud with The Headhunters saw Los Cowboys lose the CMLL World Tag Team Championship to the Headhunter duo. The two teams took their storyline around the globe, facing off both in the Headhunters' native Puerto Rico and in Japan as well. During 1995 Los Cowboys began working for the Japanese-based International Wrestling Association where they won the IWA World Tag Team championship from the Headhunters on March 3, 1995. The duo lost the tag team titles on August 20 the same year on the undercard of the IWA's "King of Deathmatches" show. After 1995 Los Cowboys would only team together on rare occasions.

=== Late career ===
In 1997 El Texano began working for Promo Azteca and when that promotion folded joined most of the other Promo Azteca wrestlers as they were absorbed by Asistencia Asesoría y Administración (AAA), which had grown to become one of Mexico's top two promotions at the time (along with CMLL). In AAA he became part of a group known as Los Consagrados ("The Consecrated") along with his cousin El Dandy, Sangre Chicana and Pirata Morgan. Texano and Morgan won the Mexican National Tag Team Championship from Perro Aguayo, Jr. and Héctor Garza on September 8, 2000, and held the belts for over a year until they were defeated by the duo of Máscara Sagrada and La Parka, Jr. El Texano was injured during a steel cage match in Tijuana and wrestled his last professional wrestling match on May 15, 2005, participating in AAA's Triplemanía XIII event. During the match he teamed up with Mini Abismo Negro, Polvo de Estrellas and Tiffany only to lose to El Ángel, Lady Apache, Mascarita Sagrada and Sexy Francis in a match where El Texano spent most of the match outside the ring.

== Illness and death ==
During a match El Texano injured his back and was forced to undergo two back surgeries to two different parts of the spine. These surgeries not only did not help Aguilar's back problems but caused him more health problems. During the final months of his life his breathing was supported by a ventilator and he was unable to even sit up. On the evening of January 15, 2006, Aguilar was rushed to a hospital in Guadalajara, Jalisco, for emergency surgery due to complications from pneumonia. Aguilar was pronounced dead upon arrival due to lung and respiratory failure.

== Championships and accomplishments ==
- Asistencia Asesoría y Administración
  - Mexican National Tag Team Championship (1 time) – with Pirata Morgan (Note: the Mexican National Tag Team Championship is sanctioned by the Mexico City Boxing and Wrestling Commission, but was promoted by AAA at this point in time)
- Comisión de Box y Lucha Libre Mexico D.F.
  - Distrito Federal Tag Team Championship – with Negro Navarro
- Consejo Mundial de Lucha Libre
  - CMLL World Tag Team Championship (1 time) – with Silver King
- International Wrestling Association of Japan
  - IWA World Tag Team Championship (1 time) – with Silver King
- Pro Wrestling Illustrated
  - PWI ranked him #342 of the 500 best singles wrestlers during the PWI Years in 2003.
  - PWI ranked him #68 of the 100 best tag teams during the PWI Years with Silver King in 2003.
- Universal Wrestling Association
  - UWA World Light Heavyweight Championship (1 time)
  - UWA World Middleweight Championship (1 time)
  - UWA World Tag Team Championship (1 time) – with Silver King
  - UWA World Trios Championship (2 times) – With Negro Navarro and El Signo
  - UWA World Welterweight Championship (1 time)
- World Wrestling Association
  - WWA Tag Team Championship (2 times – with Silver King.
- World Wrestling Council
  - WWC World Junior Heavyweight Championship (1 time)
- Wrestling Observer Newsletter

- Wrestling Observer Newsletter Hall of Fame (Class of 2019) as part of Los Misioneros de la Muerte

== Luchas de Apuestas record ==
Winner (wager)	Loser (wager)	Location	Event	Date	Notes
Brazo de Oro (mask)	El Texano (mask)	Naucalpan, Mexico State	Live event	December 4, 1977	
El Texano (hair)	El Signo (hair)	Naucalpan, State of Mexico	Live event	N/A	
El Texano (hair)	Babe Face (hair)	Naucalpan, State of Mexico	Live event	N/A	
El Texano (hair)	El Estudiante (hair)	N/A	Live event	N/A	
El Texano (hair)	Gran Hamada (hair)	N/A	Live event	N/A	
El Texano (hair)	El Tacaño (hair)	N/A	Live event	N/A	
El Texano (hair)	El Impacto (hair)	N/A	Live event	N/A	
El Solar (mask)	El Texano (hair)	N/A	Live event	N/A	
Super Astro (mask)	El Texano (hair)	N/A	Live event	N/A	
Dr. Wagner (mask) and El Texano (hair)	Robot C-3 (mask) and Astro Rey (hair)	Naucalpan, State of Mexico	Live event	March 16, 1980	(Note: Finals of a losers advance tag team tournament.)
Gran Hamada, Enrique Vera and Kobayashi (hair)	Los Misioneros de la Muerte (hair) (El Signo, El Texano and Negro Navarro)	Mexico City	Live event	June 7, 1981	
Los Misioneros de la Muerte (hair) (El Signo, El Texano and Negro Navarro)	Takano, Saito and Kobayashi (hair)	Mexico City	Live event	June 13, 1982	
Villano III (mask)	El Texano (hair)	Mexico City	Live event	August 15, 1982	
Perro Aguayo (hair)	El Texano (hair)	Tijuana, Baja California	Live event	July 15, 1983	
Los Misioneros de la Muerte (hair) (El Signo, El Texano and Negro Navarro)	El Dandy, Talismán and Jerry Estrada (hair)	Mexico City	Live event	September 5, 1986	
Ringo Mendoza, Américo Rocca and Tony Salazar (hair)	Los Misioneros de la Muerte (hair) (El Signo, El Texano and Negro Navarro)	Mexico City	EMLL 53rd Anniversary Show	September 19, 1986	
El Satánico (hair)	El Texano (hair)	Mexico City	Live event	August 16, 1988	
Los Cowboys (hair) (Silver King and El Texano)	The Can-Am Express (masks) (Doug Furnas and Dan Kroffat)	Naucalpan, State of Mexico	Live event	July 12, 1992	
El Texano (hair)	Black Power (hair)	Puebla, Puebla	Live event	October 19, 1992	
Los Cowboys (hair) (Silver King and El Texano)	Los Crazy Stars (masks) (Crazy Star I and Crazy Star II)	Naucalpan, Mexico State	Live event	November 8, 1992	
El Texano (hair)	Crazy Star I (hair)	Puebla, Puebla	Live event	November 30, 1992	
El Texano (hair)	Scorpio (hair)	Naucalpan, State of Mexico	Live event	August 8, 1993	
Ricky Santana (hair)	El Texano (hair)	Mexico City	CMLL 61st Anniversary Show	September 30, 1994	
Ricky Santana (hair)	El Texano (hair)	Bayamón, Puerto Rico	Live event	August 1, 1998	
Perro Aguayo Jr. (hair)	El Texano (hair)	Tijuana, Baja California	Live event	May 19, 2000	
El Zorro (hair)	El Texano (hair)	Tijuana, Baja California	Live event	November 30, 2001	(Note: Team lost a Relevos Suicidas tag team match Pirata Morgan and Príncipe Arandú and were forced to wrestle each other.)
Randy (hair)	El Texano (hair)	Torreón, Coahuila	Live event	April 19, 2002	(Note: El Texano was injured so his son Kempo Kid wrestled in his place, but Texano had his hair shaved off as a result of the loss.)
Delfin (mask)	El Texano (hair)	Culiacán, Sinaloa	Live event	March 21, 2003	(Note: Steel cage match.)
El Texano (hair)	Salsero (hair)	Reynosa, Tamaulipas	Live event	June 10, 2003	
El Intocable (mask)	El Texano (hair)	Orizaba, Veracruz	Live event	May 15, 2004	(Note: Steel cage match that also included El Intocable and La Fiera.)
Super Parka (hair)	El Texano (hair)	Tijuana, Baja California	Live event	March 25, 2005	(Note: Steel cage match that also included Antifaz del Norte, Rey Misterio, El Satánico, Villano III and El Solar.)

== See also ==
- List of premature professional wrestling deaths
