= Gran Hamada =

Japanese professional wrestler (1950–2025)

Personal information
- Born: Hiroaki Hamadeh; November 27, 1950 Maebashi, Gunma, Japan
- Died: February 15, 2025 (aged 74) San Luis Potosí, Mexico
- Children: Ayako Hamada (daughter); Xóchitl Hamada (daughter)
- Relatives: Pentagón Black (son-in-law); Silver King (ex-son-in-law); Tiger Mask IV (ex-son-in-law)

Professional wrestling career
- Ring name(s): El Gran Hamadeh; Gran Hamadeh; Hiroaki Hamadeh; Little Hamada; Makai Masked Hurricane; Mini Love Machine
- Billed height: 1.68 m (5 ft 6 in)
- Billed weight: 92 kg (203 lb)
- Debut: March 16, 1972
- Retired: September 28, 2018

Hiroaki Hamada (浜田 広秋, Hamada Hiroaki), better known by his ring name Gran Hamada (グラン浜田, Guran Hamada; November 27, 1950 – February 15, 2025), was a Japanese professional wrestler, the first to adopt the high-flying Mexican lucha libre style. He wrestled for New Japan Pro-Wrestling, the Universal Wrestling Federation, Michinoku Pro, and All Japan Pro Wrestling and was the founder of Universal Lucha Libre. He also had stints with the World Wrestling Federation and Extreme Championship Wrestling in the United States. His daughters Xóchitl Hamada and Ayako Hamada are professional Japanese-Mexican wrestlers.

== Professional wrestling career ==
Hamada was one of the first dojo trainees at New Japan Pro-Wrestling, being known as Little Hamada in the beginning. He was sent to Mexico's Universal Wrestling Association because of his lack of size and he found a lot of success there - so much so that Mexican fans and promoters began calling him Gran Hamada (Great Hamada). He also competed in Empresa Mexicana de Lucha Libre, which added El (The) to the front of his name: El Gran Hamada.

In 1984, he became a member of the initial roster of the original Japanese UWF, but found that his flamboyantly acrobatic style clashed with the martial arts-inspired style and focus on realism of the UWF and soon left for All Japan Pro Wrestling. He eventually broke off from AJPW to form his own promotion in 1990: Universal Lucha Libre. However, wrestlers began to leave the group in 1993 and in 1995 Hamada closed the promotion to join Michinoku Pro, which had been formed by former Universal Lucha Libre wrestlers. On April 13, 1997, Hamada teamed with Great Sasuke and Masato Yakushiji (who substituted for Gran Naniwa, who was injured) to defeat Taka Michinoku, Dick Togo and Mens Teioh (AKA "Terry Boy") at ECW Barely Legal.

In 2001, he began competing for All Japan again, this time as a free agent. He briefly was part of the "Love Machines" stable under a mask as "Mini Love Machine" with "Super Love Machine" (Junji Hirata of New Japan, reprising his old role as "Super Strong Machine") and "Love Machine Storm" (Arashi, whose stage name literally means "storm"). They used Morning Musume's hit song "Love Machine" as their entrance theme. He would also briefly work for New Japan Pro-Wrestling's Wrestle Land brand as Makai Masked Hurricane but only wrestled two shows under that name.

== Personal life and death ==
Hamada died on February 15, 2025, at the age of 74.

His daughters, Xochitl and Ayako, are also professional wrestlers.

== Championships and accomplishments ==
- All Japan Pro Wrestling
  - International Junior Heavyweight Tag Team League (1984) – with Mighty Inoue
- Arsion
  - P*Mix Tag Team Championship (1 time) – with Ayako Hamada
- Big Japan Pro Wrestling
  - BJW Heavyweight Championship (1 time)
- Empresa Mexicana de Lucha Libre
  - NWA World Middleweight Championship (1 time) (Note: At the time EMLL was part of the National Wrestling Alliance)
- Michinoku Pro Wrestling
  - Apex of Triangle Six–Man Tag Team Championship (1 time) – with The Great Sasuke and Tiger Mask
  - Fukumen World Tag League (2000) – with Tiger Mask IV
- NWA Hollywood Wrestling
  - NWA Americas Heavyweight Championship (1 time)
- New Japan Pro-Wrestling
  - One Night Eight Man Tag Team Tournament (1994) – with Shinjiro Otani, El Samurai and Great Sasuke
- Pro Wrestling Illustrated
  - PWI ranked him #87 of the top 500 singles wrestlers of the "PWI Years" in 2003
- Universal Lucha Libre
  - UWA/UWF Intercontinental Tag Team Championship (1 time)
  - UWF Super Middleweight Championship (1 time)
  - WWA World Junior Light Heavyweight Championship (1 time)
- Universal Wrestling Association
  - UWA World Junior Light Heavyweight Championship (5 times)
  - UWA World Light Heavyweight Championship (2 times)
  - UWA World Middleweight Championship (3 times)
  - UWA World Tag Team Championship (3 times) – with Riki Choshu (1), Perro Aguayo (1) and Kendo (1)
  - UWA World Welterweight Championship (1 time)
  - WWF Light Heavyweight Championship (2 times) (Note: Hamada won the WWF title during a time that it was promoted by the UWA and exclusively in Mexico. The title reigns are not officially recognized by World Wrestling Entertainment. No reign with the championship prior to December 1997 is officially recognized or acknowledged by the World Wrestling Entertainment.)
- World Wrestling Federation
  - WWF Intercontinental Tag Team Championship (1 time, inaugural and final) – with Perro Aguayo
- Wrestling Observer Newsletter
  - Wrestling Observer Newsletter Hall of Fame (2025)

== Luchas de Apuestas record ==
Winner (wager)	Loser (wager)	Location	Event	Date	Notes
El Texano (hair)	Gran Hamada (hair)	N/A	Live event	N/A	
Gran Hamada (hair)	El Coloso (hair)	N/A	Live event	N/A	
Gran Hamada (hair)	Astro Rey (hair)	Naucalpan, State of Mexico	Live event	N/A	
Gran Hamada (hair)	Flama Azul (hair)	Naucalpan, State of Mexico	Live event	N/A	
Gran Hamada (hair)	César Valentino (hair)	Naucalpan, State of Mexico	Live event	N/A	
Gran Hamada (hair)	René Guajardo (hair)	Naucalpan, State of Mexico	Live event	N/A	
El Signo (hair)	Gran Hamada (hair)	Naucalpan, State of Mexico	Live event	July 26, 1975	
Aníbal (mask)	Gran Hamada (hair)	Nezahualcoyotl, State of Mexico	Live event	August 22, 1980	
Gran Hamada, Enrique Vera and Kobayashi (hair)	Los Misioneros de la Muerte (hair) (El Signo, El Texano and Negro Navarro)	Mexico City	Live event	June 7, 1981	
Gran Hamada (hair)	Black Power (mask)	Tokyo, Japan	Live event	September 12, 1991	
Gran Hamada (hair)	El Engendro (hair)	Cuernavaca, Morelos	Live event	February 29, 1992	
