= Rocky Santana =

Mexican professional wrestler

Personal information
- Born: Victor Manuel Vargas Abreu; July 26, 1955 (age 71) Mexico City, Mexico

Professional wrestling career
- Ring name(s): Rocky Santana; Black Shadow; Tortuguillo Karateka I Onita Santana
- Billed height: 173 cm (5 ft 8 in)
- Billed weight: 96 kg (212 lb)
- Trained by: Villano I Felip Ham Lee; Al Galicia
- Debut: 1969 or 1972

Victor Manuel Vargas Abreu (born July 26, 1955 in Mexico City, Mexico) is a Mexican professional wrestler who has been working since 1969. He was well known in the Universal Wrestling Association during the 1980s and 1990s.

== Professional wrestling career ==
Santana made his professional wrestling debut as a teenager in either 1969 or 1972. Won the UWA World Junior Light Heavyweight Championship in 1992. Also worked in Japan for Universal Pro-Wrestling and Big Japan Pro Wrestling during the 1990s. Santana claims having over 120 hair matches wins and only 6 losses.

As of 2026, he still wrestles at 70.

== Championships and accomplishments ==
- Alianza Universal de Lucha Libre
  - AULL Trios Championship (4 times) – with Robin Maravilla (2), Negro Navarro (1), El Gallego, Yakuza and Romano Garica
- Universal Wrestling Association

- UWA World Junior Light Heavyweight Championship (1 time)
- UWA World Trios Championship (6 times) – With Negro Navarro and El Signo (2)
