= Universal Wrestling Association =

Mexican professional wrestling promotion

- Acronym: UWA
- Founded: January 29, 1975
- Defunct: 1995
- Style: Lucha Libre
- Headquarters: Naucalpan
- Founder(s): Francisco Flores; Ray Mendoza; Benjamín Mora, Jr.
- Owner(s): Francisco Flores; Ray Mendoza; Benjamín Mora, Jr.

The Universal Wrestling Association (UWA) was a Mexican professional wrestling promotion based in Naucalpan, Mexico State that operated from 1975 until 1995. The name of the actual promotion was Promociones Mora y Asociados and later Lucha Libre Internacional (LLI) ("International wrestling") but outside of Mexico it is generally referred to as the UWA as it was the name of the fictional international sanctioning body that in storyline terms oversaw all championships promoted by LLI. The company was founded by wrestler and trainer Ray Mendoza, promoter Francisco Flores and investor Benjamín Mora, Jr. as when they broke away from Empresa Mexicana de Lucha Libre to form their own promotion. The company had working agreements with wrestling promotions both in the United States and Japan as they worked with Lou Thesz's American-based Universal Wrestling Association, New Japan Pro-Wrestling (NJPW), the World Wrestling Federation (WWF), Universal Lucha Libre (UWF), and Japan Women's Pro-Wrestling (JWP) amongst other promotions.

== History ==
In 1974, Empresa Mexicana de Lucha Libre (EMLL, later CMLL) founder and owner Salvador Lutteroth González brought his son into the promotion, grooming him to take over when the aging Lutteroth, Sr. eventually had to retire. This action combined with a very rigid and conservative promotional philosophy led EMLL's promoter in Naucalpan, Mexico State, Francisco Flores, EMLL wrestler and trainer Ray Mendoza and investor Benjamin Mora, Jr. to break away from EMLL to form their own company and challenge EMLL's dominance in Mexico. With the impending change of management in EMLL many wrestlers who had previously been loyal to Lutteroth decided to leave with Flores, Mendoza and Mora including Mendoza's close friends Rene Guajardo and Karloff Lagarde and a number of young wrestles, frustrated with the lack of opportunities in EMLL. They formed the company Promociones Mora y Asociados (later Lucha Libre Internacional (LLI)), which would later become widely known as the Universal Wrestling Association (UWA), the name of its fictional governing body which was adopted from the short-lived American-based UWA promotion ran by Lou Thesz, and held their first show on January 29, 1975, creating the first true rival for EMLL in decades.

To some the promotion was known as "Lucha Libre from El Toreo de Naucalpan" (simply "El Toreo"), after the promotion's home base, El Toreo de Naucalpan, which was a building Flores had promoted wrestling in for years before the split. El Toreo de Naucalpan (a former bullring turned into an arena in 1968, now demolished and formerly located near Metro Cuatro Caminos station) became UWA's main venue, used for major title matches, their anniversary shows and significant Lucha de Apuesta (bet matches) events.

UWA's more relaxed approach to wrestling, combined with their willingness to promote younger wrestlers made the promotion a quick success as they drew repeated sell-out crowds at El Toreo de Naucalpan. The promotion was the first to elevate wrestlers such as El Canek, Dos Caras, Fishman, Villano III to main event status. El Canek became the "face of the UWA", holding the UWA World Heavyweight Championship no less than 13 times during the promotion's life span, drawing full houses when he "defended Mexico's honor" against foreign wrestlers such as Hulk Hogan, Tatsumi Fujinami and Big Van Vader.

The UWA also reached out to promotions around the globe and forged working relationships with the World Wrestling Federation (WWF) in the United States and New Japan Pro-Wrestling (NJPW) and Japan Women's Pro-Wrestling in Japan. This working relationship resulted in a larger influx of foreign wrestlers than EMLL was ever able to produce and also led to the UWA actually gaining exclusive rights to promote a WWF branded championship, the WWF World Light Heavyweight Championship in the early 1980s, even if the promotion does not acknowledge this lineage in their official title history today.

The UWA even began working with EMLL in the 1980s, co-promoting shows and allowing EMLL to book UWA wrestlers on their shows. By the early 1990s UWA began to struggle financially as several of their top wrestlers left the company to work for EMLL who could offer them more money.

In 1992 Antonio Peña broke away from EMLL, much like the UWA had 18 years earlier, and formed a new company called Asistencia Asesoría y Administración (AAA) further affecting the UWA's finances. As the peso devaluated sharply in the mid-1990s, the UWA was forced to close its doors in 1995.

== Legacy ==
The UWA is remembered as the place where a lot of the main event wrestlers of the 1980s and 1990s for both CMLL and AAA got their starts, including El Canek, now considered a legend in lucha libre. The UWA also helped popularize the match format that is now the most common in Mexico, the Best two out of three falls six-man tag team match, or trios match when they put together the rudo (bad guy) trio Los Misioneros de la Muerte (Negro Navarro, El Signo and El Texano) and matched them up against trios of popular tecnicos (good guys) and drew so many sell-crowds that other promotions began to heavily promote the trios format as well.

Los Misionares de la Muerte were originally workhorse midcarders in the UWA, but their stock rose immediately in a UWA match on November 2, 1980, in a match where the three faced Huracan Ramirez, Black Shadow, and the legendary El Santo. Santo, 63 years old at the time, suffered a legitimate heart attack during the match, which ended in a no contest while he was rushed to the hospital. The three were then re-cast as fallen angels sent to Earth to take out Santo, and were programmed against trios of other tecnicos.

== Championships ==
The Universal Wrestling Association promoted a large number of wrestling championships, spread out over several weight classes like in professional boxing and even co-promoted championships with the WWF in the United States and with the UWF and JWP in Japan. Some UWA titles are still being used today, some in Japanese promotions who bought the rights to the belts and the name to give them a lucha libre link, others are considered more "vanity" championships, personally owned by whoever holds them and are often used more as a storyline prop, although they are at times defended and even change hands. In some cases the UWA championship belts are bought and sold by the champions. At times both CMLL and AAA have acknowledged and promoted UWA championships. This has occurred as recently as 2011.

Universal Wrestling Association championships
| Championship | Last official champion(s) | Date won | Current/last champion(s) | Date won | Promotion(s) | Active? |
|---|---|---|---|---|---|---|
| UWA World Heavyweight Championship | El Canek | March 18, 1994 | Dr. Wagner, Jr. | June 18, 2004 | Personal | No |
| UWA World Junior Heavyweight Championship | Aero Flash | September 1995 | The Wolf | April 14, 2024 | Fight of the Ring | Yes |
| UWA World Light Heavyweight Championship | Villano V | January 1, 1994 | Chessman | August 18, 2007 | AAA | No |
| UWA World Junior Light Heavyweight Championship | Gran Hamada | September 22, 1993 | Súper Nova | May 17, 2013 | Personal | No |
| UWA World Middleweight Championship | El Texano | February 12, 1995 | Kyu Mogami | June 20, 2019 | Active Advance Pro Wrestling | Yes |
| UWA World Welterweight Championship | Shinjiro Otani | December 13, 1994 | —N/a | —N/a | —N/a | No |
| UWA World Lightweight Championship | Loco Valentino | September 22, 1994 | Kancho Nagase | September 3, 2015 | Fight of the Ring | Yes |
| UWA World Featherweight Championship | Coralillo | August 25, 1992 | —N/a | —N/a | —N/a | No |
| UWA World Tag Team Championship | Los Villanos (Villano IV and Villano V) | March 1993 | Yapper Man #1 and Yapper Man #2 | October 19, 2019 | Michinoku Pro Wrestling | Yes |
| UWA World Trios Championship | Los Misionares de la Muerte (Negro Navarro, Rocky Santana and El Signo) | October 9, 1994 | Aagan Iisou (Shuji Kondo, Takuya Sugawara and Toru Owashi) | October 21, 2021 | Big Japan Pro Wrestling; Pro-Wrestling Basara | Yes |
| UWA/UWF Intercontinental Tag Team Championship | Gran Hamada and Great Sasuke | November 20, 1992 | Kazma and Kengo Mashimo | March 6, 2005 | Michinoku Pro Wrestling | No |
| UWA Intercontinental Tag Team Championship | —N/a | —N/a | Kenichiro Arai and The Wolf | May 8, 2023 | Fight of the Ring | Yes |
| UWA Asia Pacific Heavyweight Championship | —N/a | —N/a | Shogun Okamoto | April 22, 2021 | Strong Style Pro-Wrestling | Yes |
| UWA World Women's Championship | Zuleyma | February 23, 1991 | Miss Janeth | 2002 | Personal | No |
| UWA World Women's Tag Team Championship | Yumiko Hotta and Takako Inoue | September 5, 1993 | —N/a | —N/a | —N/a | No |
| UWA Women's International Championship | Harley Saito | February 11, 1991 | —N/a | —N/a | —N/a | No |
| UWA Women's Junior Championship | Cutie Suzuki | October 10, 1991 | —N/a | —N/a | —N/a | No |
| WWF Light Heavyweight Championship | Aero Flash | June 15, 1995 | —N/a | —N/a | —N/a | No |

== Shows ==
| Event | Date | City | Venue | Main Event |
|---|---|---|---|---|
| UWA Debut Show | January 29, 1975 | Naucalpan, Mexico State | El Toreo de Naucalpan | Aníbal defeated Rene Guajardo |
| UWA 1st Anniversary Show | 1976 | Naucalpan, Mexico State | El Toreo de Naucalpan | No record found for match results |
| UWA 2nd Anniversary Show | 1977 | Naucalpan, Mexico State | El Toreo de Naucalpan | No record found for match results |
| UWA 3rd Anniversary Show | 1978 | Naucalpan, Mexico State | El Toreo de Naucalpan | No record found for match results |
| UWA 4th Anniversary Show | 1979 | Naucalpan, Mexico State | El Toreo de Naucalpan | No record found for match results |
| UWA 5th Anniversary Show | 1980 | Naucalpan, Mexico State | El Toreo de Naucalpan | No record found for match results |
| UWA 6h Anniversary Show | February 7, 1981 | Naucalpan, Mexico State | El Toreo de Naucalpan | El Solitario wrestled Villano III to a time-limit draw. |
| UWA 7th Anniversary Show | February 14, 1982 | Naucalpan, Mexico State | El Toreo de Naucalpan | Abdullah the Butcher and Perro Aguayo defeated Antonio Inoki and Tatsumi Fujinami |
| UWA 8th Anniversary Show | 1983 | Naucalpan, Mexico State | El Toreo de Naucalpan | No record found for match results |
| UWA 9th Anniversary Show | January 29, 1984 | Naucalpan, Mexico State | El Toreo de Naucalpan | El Canek defeated André the Giant |
| UWA 10th Anniversary Show | 1985 | Naucalpan, Mexico State | El Toreo de Naucalpan | No record found for match results |
| UWA 11th Anniversary Show | 1986 | Naucalpan, Mexico State | El Toreo de Naucalpan | No record found for match results |
| UWA 12th Anniversary Show | 1987 | Naucalpan, Mexico State | El Toreo de Naucalpan | No record found for match results |
| UWA 13th Anniversary Show | 1988 | Naucalpan, Mexico State | El Toreo de Naucalpan | No record found for match results |
| UWA 14th Anniversary Show | January 29, 1989 | Naucalpan, Mexico State | El Toreo de Naucalpan | El Canek defeated Konnan |
| UWA 15th Anniversary Show | 1990 | Naucalpan, Mexico State | El Toreo de Naucalpan | No record found for match results |
| UWA 16th Anniversary Show | January 27, 1991 | Naucalpan, Mexico State | El Toreo de Naucalpan | El Canek, Mil Mascaras and Dos Caras defeated The Hawaiian Beasts (Fatu, Great Kokina and The Samoan Savage) |
| UWA 17th Anniversary Show | January 26, 1992 | Naucalpan, Mexico State | El Toreo de Naucalpan | Chris Benoit defeated Villano III |
| UWA 18th Anniversary Show | January 31, 1993 | Naucalpan, Mexico State | El Toreo de Naucalpan | Vampiro defeated El Canek |
| UWA 19th Anniversary Show | January 30, 1994 | Naucalpan, Mexico State | El Toreo de Naucalpan | Yamato, Villano III and Villano V defeated El Canek, Gran Hamada and Transformer |

== See also ==
- List of professional wrestling promotions in Mexico
