= Festival de las Máscaras (2008) =

2008 International Wrestling Revolution Group event

- Official poster for the event
- Promotion: International Wrestling Revolution Group
- Date: August 21, 2008
- City: Naucalpan, State of Mexico
- Venue: Arena Naucalpan

Event chronology
← Previous; Rey del Ring	Next → El Castillo del Terror

IWRG Festival de las Máscaras chronology
← Previous; First	Next → 2009

The 2008 Festival de las Máscaras (Spanish for "Festival of the Mask") was a major lucha libre event produced and scripted by the Mexican International Wrestling Revolution Group (IWRG) professional wrestling promotion on August 21, 2008. The show was held in Arena Naucalpan, Naucalpan, State of Mexico, which is IWRG's primary venue.

For the first ever Festival de las Máscaras show Halcón Ortiz, Mano Negra, El Pantera, El Audaz, Cien Caras, Máscara Año 2000 and Universo 2000 were all allowed to wrestle wearing the mask they had previous lost in a Lucha de Apuestas, or "bet match". In the main event El Audaz, Dr. Wagner Jr. and Rayo de Jalisco Jr. defeated Los Hermanos Dinamita (Cien Caras, Máscara Año 2000 and Universo 2000)

== Production ==
=== Background ===
The wrestling mask has always held a sacred place in lucha libre, carrying with it a mystique and anonymity beyond what it means to wrestlers elsewhere in the world. The ultimate humiliation a luchador can suffer is to lose a Lucha de Apuestas, or bet match. Following a loss in a Lucha de Apuesta match the masked wrestler would be forced to unmask, state their real name and then would be unable to wear that mask while wrestling anywhere in Mexico. Since 2007 the Mexican wrestling promotion International Wrestling Revolution Group (IWRG; Sometimes referred to as Grupo Internacional Revolución in Spanish) has held a special annual show where they received a waiver to the rule from the State of Mexico Wrestling Commission and wrestlers would be allowed to wear the mask they previously lost in a Lucha de Apuestas.

The annual IWRG Festival de las Máscaras ("Festival of the Masks") event is also partly a celebration or homage of lucha libre history with IWRG honoring wrestlers of the past at the events similar to Consejo Mundial de Lucha Libre's (CMLL) Homenaje a Dos Leyendas ("Homage to Two Legends") annual shows. The IWRG's Festival de las Máscaras shows, as well as the majority of the major IWRG shows in general, are held in Arena Naucalpan, owned by the promoters of IWRG and is their main venue. The 2008 Festival de las Máscaras show was the first year that IWRG held the show, starting an annual tradition.

José Luis Melchor Ortiz began wrestling as El Halcón in 1973, then later on modifying his name to Halcón Ortiz and at one point Super Halcón. Ortiz had retired in the mid-1990s, focusing on training his son Super Halcón Jr. Ortiz lost the "El Halcón" mask to Mil Máscaras in 1977 and then began working as Halcón Ortiz. He would later don a mask again, as Super Halcón, losing that mask to Rayo de Jalisco Jr. in 1989.

For years Jesús Reza Rosales wrestled as the masked Mano Negra ("Black Hand"), making his debut in 1971. His Lucha de Apuestas loss to Atlantis was the main event of the CMLL 60th Anniversary Show. Wrestler Pantera began his career in 1985, initially working as "Pantera II", but later became simply "Pantera" as Pantera I disappeared from the wrestling scene. On July 14, 2006, Pantera lost a Luchas de Apuestas match to Misterioso Jr. and was forced to unmask. Unlike most other wrestlers Pantera would later wrestle with the Pantera mask once more, initially first in the United States and Japan where he was not bound by the Mexican lucha libre commission rules.

Doménico Bazán León made his debut as the masked wrestler El Audaz ("The Audacious One") in 1966. He would lose his mask to El Solitario on April 12, 1976, after the two lost a relevos suicida match to Aníbal and Rayo de Jalisco and were forced to wrestle each other. The brother trio known as Los Hermanos Dinamita ("The Dynamite Brothers"; Cien Caras, Máscara Año 2000 and Universo 2000) all began their careers as masked wrestlers and built a legacy over the years by winning various Luchas de Apuestas. Of the three the oldest brother, Cien Caras. was the first to lose his mask. Long time rival Rayo de Jalisco, Jr. defeated Cien Caras in the main event of the EMLL 57th Anniversary Show on September 21, 1990, forcing him to unmask. Next was Máscara Año 2000, who lost his mask to Perro Aguayo in the main event of Asistencia Asesoría y Administracións (AAA) Triplemanía event. Universo 2000 was the only one to make it into the new millennium with his mask, until a Lucha de Apuestas match that took place on September 17, 2004, and was the main event of the CMLL 71st Anniversary Show. The match was a three-way match between Universo 2000, El Canek and Dr. Wagner Jr. In the end El Canek pinned Universo 2000, forcing him to umask.

=== Storylines ===
The event featured five professional wrestling matches with different wrestlers involved in pre-existing scripted feuds, plots and storylines. Wrestlers were portrayed as either heels (referred to as rudos in Mexico, those that portray the "bad guys") or faces (técnicos in Mexico, the "good guy" characters) as they followed a series of tension-building events, which culminated in a wrestling match or series of matches.

== Event ==
In the main event Rayo de Jalisco Jr. pinned one of the Hermanos Dinamita to win the match, which immediately drew both El Hijo de Cien Caras and Máscara Año 2000 Jr. back to the ring after the previous match, helping the first generation Dinamitas attack El Audaz, Dr. Wagner Jr. and Rayo de Jalisco Jr.

== Aftermath ==
The long-running storyline between Rayo de Jalisco Jr. and Los Hermanos Dinamita would continue to simmer over the years both in IWRG and outside. For the 2013 Festival de las Máscaras show Rayo de Jalisco Jr. and Universo 2000 were once again on opposite sides of the main event, with Rayo de Jalisco Jr.'s team of himself El Solar and El Veneno defeated Universo 2000, Villano IV and Pirata Morgan.

== Results ==
No.	Results	Stipulations
1	Heavy Boy defeated Eragon	Best two-out-of-three falls
2	Los Oficiales (Oficial 911, Oficial AK-47 and Oficial Fierro) defeated Aeroman, Freelance and Zatura	Best two-out-of-three-falls six-man tag team match
3	Capitán Muerte and Los Temerarios (Black Terry and Shu el Guerrero) defeated Los Cadetos del Espacio (El Solar, Súper Astro and Ultramán Jr.)	Best two-out-of-three-falls six-man tag team match
4	Halcón Ortiz, Mano Negra and El Pantera defeated Los Dinamitas Junior (El Hijo del Cien Caras and Máscara Año 2000 Jr.) and Negro Navarro	Best two-out-of-three-falls six-man tag team match
5	El Audaz, Dr. Wagner Jr. and Rayo de Jalisco Jr. defeated Los Hermanos Dinamita (Cien Caras, Máscara Año 2000 and Universo 2000)	Best two-out-of-three-falls six-man tag team match
