= Festival de las Máscaras (2010) =

2010 International Wrestling Revolution Group event

- Promotion: International Wrestling Revolution Group
- Date: July 23, 2010
- City: Mexico City, Mexico
- Venue: Centro Banamex Convention center

Event chronology
← Previous; La Guerra Continua	Next → Guerra de Empresas

IWRG Festival de las Máscaras chronology
← Previous; 2009	Next → 2011

The 2010 Festival de las Máscaras (Spanish for "Festival of the Mask") was a major lucha libre event produced and scripted by the Mexican International Wrestling Revolution Group (IWRG) professional wrestling promotion on July 23, 2010. The show was held at the Centro Banamex Convention center at the Hipódromo de las Américas race course, part of the 2010 Lucha Libre Expo

For one night Cerebro Negro, Dr. Cerebro, El Pantera, Villano III, El Veneno, Scorpio Jr., Máscara Año 2000 and Universo 2000 all wore the mask they had lost in a Lucha de Apuestas, or bet match, in years prior. Also Mike Segura reprised the role of "Orito" ("Little Oro) for one night only and Freelance worked under a mask as Panterita years after having abandoned the character. In the main event El Canek, Scorpio Jr. and Tinieblas Jr. defeated El Hijo del Cien Caras, Máscara Año 2000 and fmoUniverso 2000.

== Production ==
=== Background ===
The wrestling mask has always held a sacred place in lucha libre, carrying with it a mystique and anonymity beyond what it means to wrestlers elsewhere in the world. The ultimate humiliation a luchador can suffer is to lose a Lucha de Apuestas, or bet match. Following a loss in a Lucha de Apuesta match the masked wrestler would be forced to unmask, state their real name and then would be unable to wear that mask while wrestling anywhere in Mexico. Since 2007 the Mexican wrestling promotion International Wrestling Revolution Group (IWRG; Sometimes referred to as Grupo Internacional Revolución in Spanish) has held a special annual show where they received a waiver to the rule from the State of Mexico Wrestling Commission and wrestlers would be allowed to wear the mask they previously lost in a Lucha de Apuestas.

The annual IWRG Festival de las Máscaras ("Festival of the Masks") event is also partly a celebration or homage of lucha libre history with IWRG honoring wrestlers of the past at the events similar to Consejo Mundial de Lucha Libre's (CMLL) Homenaje a Dos Leyendas ("Homage to Two Legends") annual shows. The IWRG's Festival de las Máscaras shows, as well as the majority of the major IWRG shows in general, are held in Arena Naucalpan, owned by the promoters of IWRG and is their main venue. The 2010 Festival de las Máscaras show was the third year in a row IWRG held the show.

IWRG regular Ricardo Antonio Morales Gonzalez, better known under the ring name Cerebro Negro (Spanish for "Black Brain"), adopted the "Cerebro Negro" enmascarado, or "masked wrestler", character in 2002 after having first worked as "Guerra C-3". For three years he wore and successfully defended his mask, until the 2005 El Castillo del Terror ("The Tower of Terror") show. Cerebro Negro was the last competitor in a steel cage match as Japanese wrestler Masada climbed out of the cage. As a result, he was forced to unmask. Cerebro Negro's long time tag team partner Dr. Cerebro also began his career as an enmascarado in 1996. Over the year he would work primarily for IWRG, at times risking his mask in various matches. On March 1, 2001 he lost a Lucha de Apuestas match to El Hijo del Santo and was forced to unmask.

Mike Segura initially worked under a mask using the name "Orito" ("Little Oro) working for Consejo Mundial de Lucha Libre (CMLL) in their Mini-Estrellas division. Once he left CMLL he modified the name to "Oro Jr." as he began working against regular sized opponents. On July 26, 1998 Oro Jr. lost his mask to Dr. Cerebro, and subsequently began working as "Mike Segura" instead, only returning to the Orito/Oro Jr. name for special occasions. Like his partner for the Festival de las Máscaras show

Marco Antonio Soto Ceja, better known as Freelance also began his career in the Mini-Estrella division working as "Panterita" ("Little Panther"). On August 6, 2006 he lost a Lucha de Apuestas match to Cerebro Negro and had to unmask. At that point in time he abandoned the Panterita ring character and became known as "Freelance".

Villano III was the first of the five Villanos to lose his mask, his older brothers Villano I and Villano II never lost their mask in the ring. Villano III agreed to lose his mask to Atlantis as part of CMLL's 2000 Juicio Final ("Final Judgement") show on March 17, 2000. The match would later be called "The biggest Apuesta match of the decade" by several wrestling magazines. The match was voted the 2000 Match of the Year in the Wrestling Observer Newsletter awards. Rafael Núñez Juan took the name Scorpio Jr. in honor of his father El Scorpio and from the mid-1980s until March 19, 1999 worked as an enmascarado. On March 19 Scorpio Jr. and Bestia Salvaje lost a tag team Lucha de Apuestas to Negro Casas and El Hijo del Santo in the main event of the 1999 Homenaje a Dos Leyendas show.

Panamania wrestler Rafael Ernesto Medina Baeza started working as the masked character "Veneno" (Spanish for "Venom") in 2000 when he began to work for CMLL in Mexico. In CMLL he was part of Los Boricuas and through that association he was matched up against former Los Boricuas member Gran Markus Jr. in a long running storyline. The two met at the 2002 Homenaje a Dos Leyendas show where Gran Markus Jr. defeated Veneno, forcing him to unmask as a result.

The brother trio known as Los Hermanos Dinamita ("The Dynamite Brothers"; Cien Caras, Máscara Año 2000 and Universo 2000) all began their careers as masked wrestlers and built a legacy over the years by winning various Luchas de Apuestas. Of the three the oldest brother, Cien Caras. was the first to lose his mask. Long time rival Rayo de Jalisco, Jr. defeated Cien Caras in the main event of the EMLL 57th Anniversary Show on September 21, 1990 forcing him to unmask. Next was Máscara Año 2000, who lost his mask to Konnan in the main event of AAA first-ever Triplemanía

lucha libre legend Universo 2000 was the last of Los Hermanos Dinamita ("the Dynamite Brothers"; Universo 2000, Cien Caras and Máscara Año 2000) to lose his mask. The match took place on September 17, 2004 and was the main event of the CMLL 71st Anniversary Show. The match was a three-way match between Universo 2000, El Canek and Dr. Wagner Jr. In the end El Canek pinned Universo 2000, forcing him to umask.

=== Storylines ===
The event featured five professional wrestling matches with different wrestlers involved in pre-existing scripted feuds, plots and storylines. Wrestlers were portrayed as either heels (referred to as rudos in Mexico, those that portray the "bad guys") or faces (técnicos in Mexico, the "good guy" characters) as they followed a series of tension-building events, which culminated in a wrestling match or series of matches.

== Event ==
The main event was supposed to feature Cien Caras competing with his brothers Universo 2000 and Máscara Año 2000 but for unexplained reasons El Hijo de Cien Caras appeared in his place during the show. Prior to the main event IWRG representatives Cesar Moreno and Black Terry awarded several wrestlers a plaque for their contributions to lucha libre including El Signo (received by his son El Hijo de Signo as his father was recovering from an injury), Tinieblas, Máscara Año 2000, Universo 2000 and Cien Caras. Due t Cien Caras' absence the award was accepted by El Hijo de Cien Caras.

== Results ==
No.	Results	Stipulations
1	Cerebro Negro and Dr. Cerebro defeated Orito and Panterita	Best two-out-of-three-falls tag team match
2	El Hijo de Fishman, El Hijo del Pirata Morgan and El Hijo del Signo defeated Bobby Lee Jr., El Hijo del Brazo de Plata and El Hijo del Pantera	Best two-out-of-three falls six-man tag team match
3	El Ángel, El Pantera and Villano III defeated Fuerza Guerrera, Pirata Morgan and El Veneno	Best two-out-of-three falls six-man tag team match
4	El Canek, Scorpio Jr. and Tinieblas Jr. defeated El Hijo del Cien Caras and Los Hermanos Dinamita (Máscara Año 2000 and Universo 2000)	Best two-out-of-three falls six-man tag team match
