= Festival de las Máscaras (2013) =

2013 International Wrestling Revolution Group event

- Official poster for the show
- Promotion: International Wrestling Revolution Group
- Date: August 11, 2013 (aired August 11, 2013 (AYM Sports))
- City: Naucalpan, State of Mexico
- Venue: Arena Naucalpan

Event chronology
← Previous; Prisión Fatal	Next → Caravana de Campeones

IWRG Festival de las Máscaras chronology
← Previous; 2012	Next → 2014

The 2013 Festival de las Máscaras (Spanish for "Festival of the Mask") was a major lucha libre event produced and scripted by the Mexican International Wrestling Revolution Group (IWRG) professional wrestling promotion on August 11, 2013. The show was held in Arena Naucalpan, Naucalpan, State of Mexico, which is IWRG's primary venue.

At the 2013 event Avisman, El Hijo del Diablo, El Hijo de Pirata Morgan, Universo 2000 and Veneno all wore their masks again after having lost Luchas de Apuestas, or "bet matches", in the past and thus lost the rights to wear their mask. In the main event long time rivals Rayo de Jalisco Jr. and Universo 2000 each captained a team as Rayo de Jalisco Jr., El Solar and Veneno defeated Universo 2000, Pirata Morgan and Villano IV.

== Production ==
=== Background ===
The wrestling mask has always held a sacred place in lucha libre, carrying with it a mystique and anonymity beyond what it means to wrestlers elsewhere in the world. The ultimate humiliation a luchador can suffer is to lose a Lucha de Apuestas, or bet match. Following a loss in a Lucha de Apuesta match the masked wrestler would be forced to unmask, state their real name and then would be unable to wear that mask while wrestling anywhere in Mexico. Since 2007 the Mexican wrestling promotion International Wrestling Revolution Group (IWRG; Sometimes referred to as Grupo Internacional Revolución in Spanish) has held a special annual show where they received a waiver to the rule from the State of Mexico Wrestling Commission and wrestlers would be allowed to wear the mask they previously lost in a Lucha de Apuestas.

The annual IWRG Festival de las Máscaras ("Festival of the Masks") event is also partly a celebration or homage of lucha libre history with IWRG honoring wrestlers of the past at the events similar to Consejo Mundial de Lucha Libre's (CMLL) Homenaje a Dos Leyendas ("Homage to Two Legends") annual shows. The IWRG's Festival de las Máscaras shows, as well as the majority of the major IWRG shows in general, are held in Arena Naucalpan, owned by the promoters of IWRG and is their main venue. The 2013 Festival de las Máscaras show was the seventh year in a row IWRG held the show.

IWRG regular Avisman made his debut as an enmascarado, or "masked professional wrestler", Avisman I teaming up with Avisman II for years. On December 21, 2003 Avisman I lost a Lucha de Apuestas to Dr. Cerebro as part of the Arena Naucalpan 26th Anniversary Show and wa forced to unmask and reveal his given name. In 2004 he defeated the other Avisman and from that point on had the exclusive rights to the name "Avisman". The wrestler known as El Hijo del Diablo, literally "the Son of the devil", not son of a wrestler known as "El Diablo", adopted the masked persona early on in his career. > In 2006 he became involved in a storyline feud against one of Consejo Mundial de Lucha Libre (CMLL) rising stars Místico, that led to the two facing off in a "mask vs. mask", Lucha de Apuestas match on December 1, 2006. Místico won the match and the mask of El Hijo del Diablo, who was forced to unmask for the first time in his career.

The wrestler known as El Hijo de Pirata Morgan ("The son of Pirata Morgan) made his debut under that name in 2007, working as a masked wrestler with a "skull and crossbones" themed mask, teaming with his father Pirata Morgan and his brother Pirata Morgan Jr. on a regular basis. > On March 16, 2013 Hijo de Pirata Morgan teamed up with Cassandro to compete in a Ruleta de la Muerte, losers advance tag team tournament to commemorate the retirement of Ray Mendoza, Jr. The duo lost to Rayo de Jalisco, Jr. and Máscara Año 2000 in the first round, and El Solar and Toscano in the second round qualifying and then lost to the team of Villano IV and Ray Mendoza, Jr. in the finals. Due to the loss Hijo de Pirata Morgan had to unmask and reveal his birthname, Antheus Ortiz Chávez, while Cassandro was shaved bald.

Panamanian wrestler Rafael Ernesto Medina Baeza started working as the masked character "Veneno" (Spanish for "Venom") in 2000 when he began to work for CMLL in Mexico. In CMLL he was part of Los Boricuas and through that association he was matched up against former Los Boricuas member Gran Markus Jr. in a long running storyline. The two met at the 2002 Homenaje a Dos Leyendas show where Gran Markus Jr. defeated Veneno, forcing him to unmask as a result. lucha libre legend Universo 2000 was the last of Los Hermanos Dinamita ("the Dynamite Brothers"; Universo 2000, Cien Caras and Máscara Año 2000) to lose his mask. The match took place on September 17, 2004 and was the main event of the CMLL 71st Anniversary Show. The match was a three-way match between Universo 2000, El Canek and Dr. Wagner Jr. In the end El Canek pinned Universo 2000, forcing him to umask.

=== Storylines ===
The event featured five professional wrestling matches with different wrestlers involved in pre-existing scripted feuds, plots and storylines. Wrestlers were portrayed as either heels (referred to as rudos in Mexico, those that portray the "bad guys") or faces (técnicos in Mexico, the "good guy" characters) as they followed a series of tension-building events, which culminated in a wrestling match or series of matches.

== Event ==
The second match of the show was supposed to have Horus team up with Chico Che and El Pantera but IWRG was forced to replace him with Fresero Jr. without explanation. After the fourth match IWRG paid homage to Pierroth Jr. who was in attendance of the show, sitting at ringside in a wheelchair still suffering the effects of a stroke in November 2008. The group honored him with a plaque and a minute of applause as he donned his signature yellow and black mask. During the main event Universo 2000 was unmasked by his long time rival Rayo de Jalisco Jr., but since Universo 2000 normally wrestles unmasked it was not an automatic disqualification. In the end Rayo de Jalisco Jr. landed a low blow on Universo 2000 while the referee was distracted and pinned him.

== Results ==
No.	Results	Stipulations
1^{D}	El Centurion, Freelance and Golden Magic defeated Dragon Celestial, Imposible and Saruman	Best two-out-of-three-falls six-man tag team match
2	Chico Che, El Pantera and Fresero Jr. defeated Los Gringos VIP (Apolo Estrada Jr., Avisman and El Hijo del Diablo)	Best two-out-of-three-falls six-man tag team match
3	El Hijo de Dr. Wagner Jr., El Hijo de Máscara Año 2000 and Super Nova defeated Bobby Lee Jr., El Hijo de Pirata Morgan and Trauma II	Best two-out-of-three-falls six-man tag team match
4	La Familia de Tijuana (Eterno and X-Fly) (with Super Nova) defeated La Dinastia de la Muerte (Negro Navarro and Trauma I) (with Trauma II) (c)	Best two-out-of-three-falls tag team match for the IWRG Intercontinental Tag Team Championship
5	Rayo de Jalisco Jr., El Solar and Veneno defeated Pirata Morgan, Universo 2000 and Villano IV	Best two-out-of-three-falls six-man tag team match
(c) / – the champion(s) heading into the match; D / – this was a dark match
