= IWRG Festival de las Máscaras =

International Wrestling Revolution Group event series

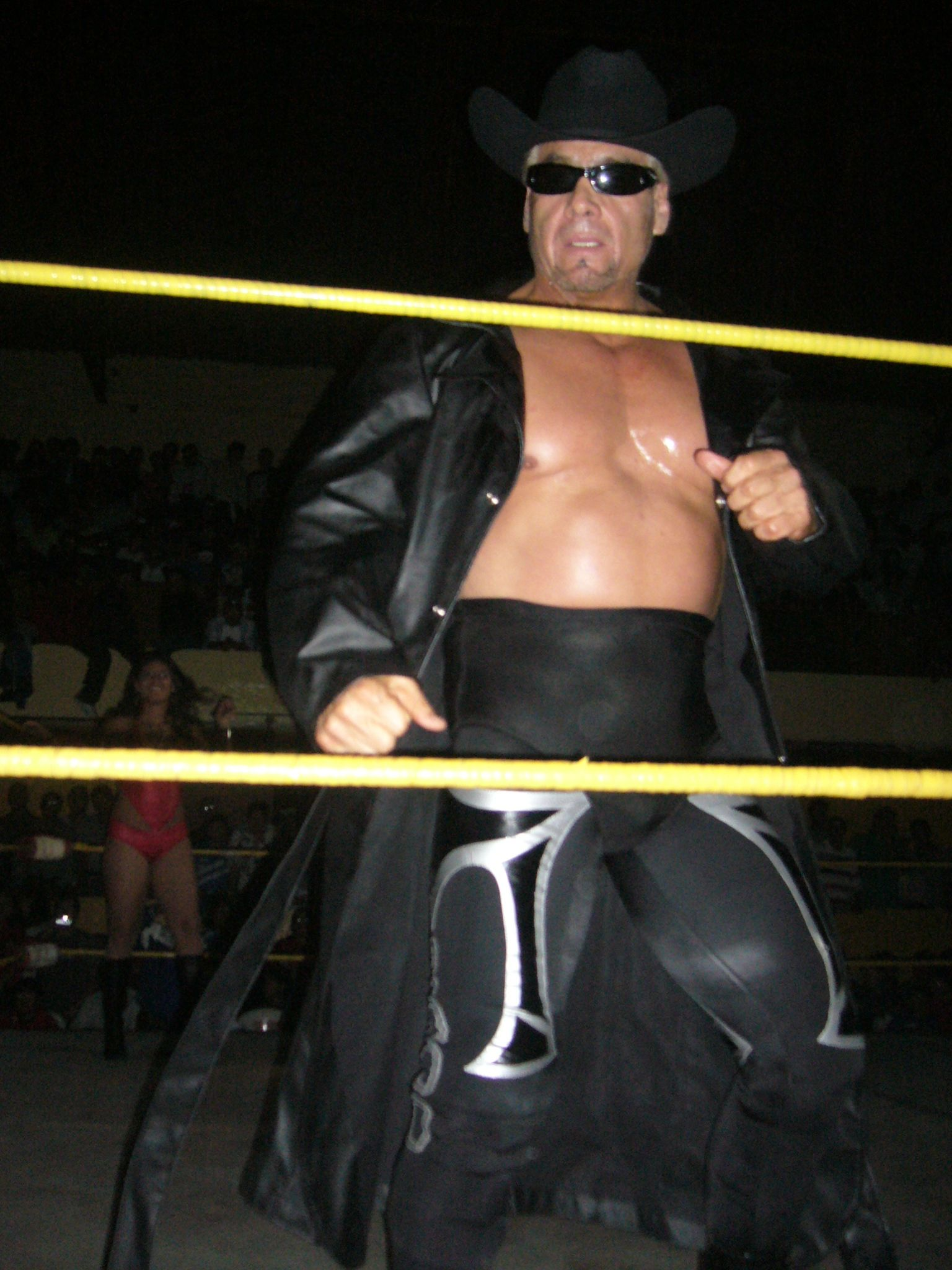
Universo 2000, who lost his mask in 2004 but has worn it as part of the Festival de las Máscaras show on multiple occasions

The Festival de las Máscaras (Spanish for "Festival of the Mask") is an annually recurring major professional wrestling show produced and scripted by International Wrestling Revolution Group (IWRG; Sometimes referred to as Grupo Internacional Revolución in Mexico). The focus of the show is paying homage to the history and "legends" of lucha libre each year. In Mexico when a wrestler loses a Lucha de Apuestas (a "bet match") and is forced to remove his wrestling mask they are usually not allowed to wrestle wearing the mask again. Starting in 2008 IWRG has held an annual show where they have been granted permission from the State of Mexico wrestling and boxing commission to allow previously unmasked wrestlers to wear their mask for one night of the year.

The first show was held on August 21, 2008, and IWRG has held an annual Festival de las Máscaras show each year since then somewhere between May and August each year. Often the main event features older wrestlers, who were the main eventers of the 1990s or early 2000s making special appearances for IWRG. All shows except the 2009 Festival de las Máscaras show have been held at Arena Naucalpan, IWRG's home arena in Naucalpan, State of Mexico, Mexico. The 2009 show was held at a convention center in Mexico City, part of that year's Lucha Libre Expo.

== Event history ==
The wrestling mask has always held a sacred place in lucha libre, carrying with it a mystique and anonymity beyond what it means to wrestlers elsewhere in the world. The ultimate humiliation a luchador can suffer is to lose a Lucha de Apuestas, or bet match. Following a loss in a Lucha de Apuesta match the masked wrestler would be forced to unmask, state their real name and then would be unable to wear that mask while wrestling anywhere in Mexico. Since 2007 the Mexican wrestling promotion International Wrestling Revolution Group (IWRG; Sometimes referred to as Grupo Internacional Revolución in Spanish) has held a special annual show where they received a waiver to the rule from the State of Mexico Wrestling Commission and wrestlers would be allowed to wear the mask they previously lost in a Lucha de Apuestas.

The annual Festival de las Máscaras ("Festival of the Masks") event is also partly a celebration or homage of lucha libre history with IWRG honoring wrestlers of the past at the events similar to Consejo Mundial de Lucha Libre's (CMLL) Homenaje a Dos Leyendas ("Homage to Two Legends") annual shows. The IWRG's Festival de las Máscaras shows, as well as the majority of the major IWRG shows in general, are held in Arena Naucalpan, owned by the promoters of IWRG and is their main venue. As of the 2015 Festival de las Máscaras show, only one show, the 2009 Festival de las Máscaras show has been held outside of Arena Naucalpan. The 2009 show was held at the Centro Banamex Convention center at the Hipódromo de las Américas in Mexico City. The show was part of the shows IWRG presented for the 2009 Lucha Libre Expo. The most recent event was the 2015 Festival de las Máscaras, which was the eight overall Festival de las Máscaras held.

As of the 2016 Festival de las Máscaras 110 male wrestlers have competed in a total of 46 matches on the shows. one show hosted only four matches, the 2016 had seven, while the rest have all consisted of five matches. IWRG regular El Pantra has worked the most show, seven out of the nine, only missing the 2015 and 2016 Festival de las Máscaras shows. Black Terry / Guerrero Maya, Negro Navarro, Veneno have all worked on six of the shows. Mike Segura has worked both under his real name as we all "Orito", his previous ring name and Freelance has work as both Freelance and Panterita, his former ring name, both of which were publicly acknowledge. Black Terry has worked primarily under his regular name but made one appearance as the masked "Guerrero Maya" as well. Canis Lupus worked first as Comando Negro and then later as Canis Lupus at different Festival de las Máscaras shows. Máscara Año 2000 has made the most appearances in a main event, headlining the first four shows in 2008, 2009, 2010 and 2011. Dr. Wagner Jr. and Rayo de Jalisco Jr. are the enmascarado wrestlers who have appeared in the main event, tied at three main events each.

The following wrestlers were allowed to wear their mask during the show: El Audaz, Guerrero Maya, Black Tiger III, Bombero Infernal / Capitan Muerte, El Brazo, Cerebro Negro, Dr. Cerebro, Cien Caras, Coco Rojo, Ricky Cruzz, Cuchillo, Eterno, Panterita, El Hijo del Diablo, El Hijo del Pirata Morgan, Kahoz, Konnan, Mano Negra, Máscara Año 2000 Jr., Máscara Año 2000, Totugillo Ninja Miguel Ángel, Oficial 911, Oficial AK-47, El Pantera, Rambo, Sangre Chicana, Scorpio Jr., Orito, El Signo, Halcón Ortiz, Universo 2000, Veneno, Villano III, Villano V and Yack. Only Oficia 911 and Oficial AK-47 have wrestled on the Festival de las Máscaras as enmascarados first, lost their masks in Luchas de Apuestas and then worn the masks again at a subsequent Festival de las Máscaras show.

Only two of the shows, the 2013 Festival de las Máscaras show and the 2014 Festival de las Máscaras show saw championship matches, in both cases for the IWRG Intercontinental Tag Team Championship. In 2013 La Familia de Tijuana ("The Family from Tijuana"; Eterno and X-Fly) defeated La Dinastia de la Muerte ("The Dynasty of Death"; Negro Navarro and Trauma I) to win the championship. In 2014 Los Oficiales (Oficial 911 and Oficial AK-47) defeated Los Gringos VIP (Apolo Estrada Jr. and El Hijo del Diablo) to win the championship.

== Dates, venues, and main events ==
Event	Date	Main event	Ref(s)
2008	August 21, 2008	El Audaz, Dr. Wagner Jr. and Rayo de Jalisco Jr. vs. Los Hermanos Dinamita (Cien Caras, Máscara Año 2000 and Universo 2000)	
2009	August 20, 2009	Kahoz, Máscara Año 2000 and Sangre Chicana vs El Fantasma, Mano Negra and Villano III	
2010	July 23, 2010	El Canek, Scorpio Jr. and Tinieblas Jr. vs. El Hijo del Cien Caras and Los Hermanos Dinamita (Máscara Año 2000 and Universo 2000)	
2011	July 3, 2011	El Canek, Rayo de Jalisco, Jr. and Konnan vs. Los Hermanos Dinamita (Cien Caras, Máscara Año 2000 and Universo 2000)	
2012	August 2, 2012	El Canek, Octagón and El Solar vs. Cien Caras, Jr., Fuerza Guerrera and Negro Navarro	
2013	August 11, 2013	Rayo de Jalisco Jr., El Solar and Veneno vs. Pirata Morgan, Universo 2000 and Villano IV	
2014	June 15, 2014	Dr. Wagner, Jr. and El Hijo de Dos Caras vs. L.A. Park and Pirata Morgan	
2015	May 5, 2015	Black Tiger III, Cien Caras Jr. and Hijo del Máscara Año 2000 vs. Chicano, Dr. Wagner Jr. and El Hijo de Dos Caras	
2016	June 5, 2016	Danny Casas vs Toscano in a steel cage, Lucha de Apuestas hair vs. hair match	
2017	July 2, 2017	Dinastia Imperial (Villano III Jr., Villano IV and Villano V Jr.) vs Los Misioneros de la Muerte (Negro Navarro, Texano Jr. and Trauma II)	
2018	June 17, 2018	El Hijo de L.A. Park and L.A. Park vs. Dragon Lee and Rush	
