= Festival de las Máscaras (2011) =

2011 International Wrestling Revolution Group event

- Promotion: International Wrestling Revolution Group
- Date: July 3, 2011
- City: Naucalpan, State of Mexico
- Venue: Arena Naucalpan

Event chronology
← Previous; La Vengenza	Next → El Gran Desafío

IWRG Festival de las Máscaras chronology
← Previous; 2010	Next → 2012

The Festival de las Máscaras (2011) (Spanish for "Festival of the Mask") was an annual professional wrestling major event produced by Mexican professional wrestling promotion International Wrestling Revolution Group (IWRG), which took place on August 2, 2011 in Arena Naucalpan, Naucalpan, State of Mexico, Mexico. For this annual event the "Comisión de Box y Lucha Libre Mexico D.F." (Mexico City Boxing and Wrestling Commission) allowed wrestlers who had previously been unmasked after losing a Luchas de Apuestas, or bet match, to wear their masks again. The main event of the show heralded back to long running storyline feuds between Rayo de Jalisco, Jr., El Canek and Konnan against the brothers known as Los Hermanos Dinamita (Cien Caras, Máscara Año 2000 and Universo 2000). Cien Caras had originally lost his mask to Rayo de Jalisco, Jr. and Universo 2000 was unmasked by El Canek, but for one night they were allowed to wear the masks again as they wrestled against their longtime rivals.

== Production ==
=== Background ===
The wrestling mask has always held a sacred place in lucha libre, carrying with it a mystique and anonymity beyond what it means to wrestlers elsewhere in the world. The ultimate humiliation a luchador can suffer is to lose a Lucha de Apuestas, or bet match. Following a loss in a Lucha de Apuesta match the masked wrestler would be forced to unmask, state their real name and then would be unable to wear that mask while wrestling anywhere in Mexico. Since 2007 the Mexican wrestling promotion International Wrestling Revolution Group (IWRG; Sometimes referred to as Grupo Internacional Revolución in Spanish) has held a special annual show where they received a waiver to the rule from the State of Mexico Wrestling Commission and wrestlers would be allowed to wear the mask they previously lost in a Lucha de Apuestas. The annual Festival de las Máscaras ("Festival of the Masks") event is also partly a celebration or homage of lucha libre history with IWRG honoring wrestlers of the past. The IWRG's Festival de las Máscaras shows, as well as the majority of the IWRG shows in general, are held in "Arena Naucalpan", owned by the promoters of IWRG and their main arena. The 2011 Festival de las Máscaras show was the fifth year in a row IWRG held the show.

=== Storylines ===
The event featured five professional wrestling matches with different wrestlers involved in pre-existing scripted feuds, plots and storylines. Wrestlers were portrayed as either heels (referred to as rudos in Mexico, those that portray the "bad guys") or faces (técnicos in Mexico, the "good guy" characters) as they followed a series of tension-building events, which culminated in a wrestling match or series of matches.

Previously unmasked wrestlers

Name	Lost mask to	Date	Note
El Brazo	Villano I, Villano IV, Villano V	October 21, 1988	
Capitan Muerte	Black Terry	June 24, 2010	
Cien Caras	Rayo de Jalisco, Jr.	September 21, 1990	
Cuchillo	El Hijo del Santo	October 30, 1988	
El Hijo del Diablo	Místico	December 1, 2006	
Kahoz	Shocker	December 15, 1995	
Konnan	Perro Aguayo	March 22, 1991	
Máscara Año 2000	Perro Aguayo	April 30, 1993	
El Pantera	Misterioso, Jr.	July 14, 2006	
Rambo	Villano III	September 17, 1983	
Scorpio, Jr.	Negro Casas and El Hijo del Santo	March 19, 1999	
Universo 2000	El Canek	September 17, 2004	
Veneno	Gran Markus, Jr.	March 17, 2002	
Yack	Oficial 911	November 1, 2009	

Outside of the main event there were not specific, pre-existing storylines built into any of the matches on the show, primarily because the show paid homage to wrestling history more than being part of any current storylines. Only the main event came with any sort of back history as El Canek, Rayo de Jalisco, Jr. and Konnan were teamed up to face Los Hermanos Dinamita (Cien Caras, Máscara Año 2000 and Universo 2000). Canek, Rayo and Konnan had all had previous feuds with one or all members of Los Hermanos Dinamita, from as far back as the 1980s. Rayo de Jalisco, Jr. was responsible for unmasking Cien Caras in 1990 when he won a Lucha de Apuesta over Caras. El Canek had been the man to unmask Universo 2000 in 2004, in a match that actually also included Rayo de Jalisco, Jr. Both Konnan and Máscara Año 2000 had lost their mask to the same man, Perro Aguayo, but had a long running storyline with each other in the early days of Asistencia Asesoría y Administración (AAA).

== Results ==
No.	Results	Stipulations
1	Dinamic Black and Ray Marin defeated Alan Extreme and Muerte Infernal – two falls to one	Best two-out-of-three falls tag team match
2	Capitan Muerte, El Hijo del Diablo and Fuego Eterno defeated Aracnido, Eterno and Yack – two falls to one	Best two-out-of-three falls six-man tag team match
3	Triangulo de la Muerte (Cuchillo, Kahoz and Rambo) defeated Coco Rojo, El Brazo and Veneno – two falls to one	Best two-out-of-three falls six-man tag team match
4	El Pantera, Fray Tormenta and El Solar defeated Black Terry, Negro Navarro and Scorpio, Jr. – two falls to one	Best two-out-of-three falls six-man tag team match
5	El Canek, Rayo de Jalisco, Jr. and Konnan defeated Los Hermanos Dinamita (Cien Caras, Máscara Año 2000 and Universo 2000) by disqualification	Best two-out-of-three falls six-man tag team match
