= Festival de las Máscaras (2012) =

2012 International Wrestling Revolution Group event

- Official poster for the event
- Promotion: International Wrestling Revolution Group
- Date: August 2, 2012
- City: Naucalpan, State of Mexico
- Venue: Arena Naucalpan

Event chronology
← Previous; Guerra de Empresas	Next → La Gran Cruzada

IWRG Festival de las Máscaras chronology
← Previous; 2011	Next → 2013

Festival de las Máscaras (2012) (Spanish for "Festival of the Mask") was an annual professional wrestling major event produced by Mexican professional wrestling promotion International Wrestling Revolution Group (IWRG), which took place on August 2, 2012 in Arena Naucalpan, Naucalpan, State of Mexico, Mexico. For this annual event the "Comisión de Box y Lucha Libre Mexico D.F." (Mexico City Boxing and Wrestling Commission) allowed wrestlers who had previously been unmasked after losing a Luchas de Apuestas, or bet match, to wear their masks again. The show featured a total of five matches with a main event Best two-out-of-three falls six-man tag team match between the team of El Canek, Octagón and El Solar facing Cien Caras, Jr., Fuerza Guerrera and Negro Navarro.

== Production ==
=== Background ===
The wrestling mask has always held a sacred place in lucha libre, carrying with it a mystique and anonymity beyond what it means to wrestlers elsewhere in the world. The ultimate humiliation a luchador can suffer is to lose a Lucha de Apuestas, or bet match. Following a loss in a Lucha de Apuesta match the masked wrestler would be forced to unmask, state their real name and then would be unable to wear that mask while wrestling anywhere in Mexico. Since 2007 the Mexican wrestling promotion International Wrestling Revolution Group (IWRG; Sometimes referred to as Grupo Internacional Revolución in Spanish) has held a special annual show where they received a waiver to the rule from the State of Mexico Wrestling Commission and wrestlers would be allowed to wear the mask they previously lost in a Lucha de Apuestas. The annual Festival de las Máscaras ("Festival of the Masks") event is also partly a celebration or homage of lucha libre history with IWRG honoring wrestlers of the past. The IWRG's Festival de las Máscaras shows, as well as the majority of the IWRG shows in general, are held in "Arena Naucalpan", owned by the promoters of IWRG and their main arena. The 2012 Festival de las Máscaras show was the sixth year in a row IWRG held the show.

=== Storylines ===
The event featured five professional wrestling matches with different wrestlers involved in pre-existing scripted feuds, plots and storylines. Wrestlers were portrayed as either heels (referred to as rudos in Mexico, those that portray the "bad guys") or faces (técnicos in Mexico, the "good guy" characters) as they followed a series of tension-building events, which culminated in a wrestling match or series of matches.

Previously unmasked wrestlers

Name	Lost mask to	Date	Note
Bombero Infernal	Pantera	December 7, 1997	
Cuchillo	El Hijo del Santo	October 30, 1988	
Dr. Cerebro	El Hijo del Santo	March 1, 2001	
El Hijo del Diablo	Místico	December 1, 2006	
Kahoz	Shocker	December 15, 1995	
Oficial AK-47	Trauma I	December 22, 2011	
Orito	N/A	N/A	Did not lose his mask but changed ring character to the unmasked Mike Segura.
Panterita	Fantasma de la Opera	August 6, 2006	Now works under the name Freelance.
Rambo	Villano III	September 17, 1953	
Veneno	Gran Markus, Jr.	March 17, 2002	
Villano III	Atlantis	March 17, 2000	
Villano V	Último Guerrero	March 20, 2009	

== Event ==
After the third match of the night IWRG held a tribute to La Cobra, whose son (either biological or storyline) had made his debut in the previous match as he teamed with El Pantera and Veneno to defeat Los Nuevos Temerarios (Alan Extreme, Black Terry and Bombero Infernal). They also paid tribute to Lucha Libre veterans Black Terry and Vilano III. In the main event El Canek got the deciding pinfall for his team on Cien Caras, Jr. as Canek, Octagón and El Solar defeated Caras, Jr., Fuerza Guerrera and Negro Navarro. Following the match El Canek made a challenge to Cien Caras, Jr. for Caras, Jr.'s IWRG Intercontinental Heavyweight Championship while long time rivals Octagón and Fuerza Guerrera challenged each other to a Luchas de Apuestas match with their masks on the line. Neither match was committed to at the time.

=== Results ===
No.	Results	Stipulations
1	Comando Negro, Eita and Imposible defeated Centvrión, Matrix, Jr. and Panterita – two falls to none	Best two-out-of-three falls six-man tag team match
2	Dr. Cerebro, Orito and Trauma II defeated Oficial AK-47, El Hijo del Diablo and Eterno	Best two-out-of-three falls six-man tag team match
3	El Pantera, La Cobra, Jr. and Veneno defeated Los Nuevos Temerarios (Alan Extreme, Black Terry and Bombero Infernal)	Best two-out-of-three falls six-man tag team match
4	Los Villanos (Villano III, Villano IV and Villano V) defeated El Triangulo de la Muerte (Cuchillo, Kahoz and Rambo)	Best two-out-of-three falls six-man tag team match
5	El Canek, Octagón and El Solar defeated Cien Caras, Jr., Fuerza Guerrera and Negro Navarro	Best two-out-of-three falls six-man tag team match
