= International Wrestling League =

Mexican professional wrestling promotion

- Acronym: IWL
- Founded: August 13, 2010
- Style: Professional wrestling Hardcore wrestling Lucha libre Shoot
- Headquarters: Tlalnepantla, Mexico State
- Founder(s): Martín Amaro Torres; Octavio Rivero
- Owner: Martín Amaro Torres
- Formerly: Independent Wrestling League

International Wrestling League (Spanish: Liga Internacional de Lucha Libre; IWL) is a Mexican professional wrestling promotion based in Tlalnepantla de Baz.

It was founded as Independent Wrestling League on August 13, 2010 by Martín Amaro, with Octavio Rivero as the head booker. In late 2010 Rivero was replaced by Amaro's niece, Ángeles Rubio, under whom IWL started a working agreement with Perros del Mal Producciones. Rubio would leave the promotion for personal reasons in April 2011. He was followed as the head booker by wrestler Fantasma de la Ópera, who started a working relationship with AAA. On May 28, 2011, it was announced that Fantasma de la Ópera would be replaced by Valerie Richter. In a press conference held on June 21, 2011, Richter announced that the company would change its name to International Wrestling League.

IWL was the first Mexican wrestling promotion to broadcast a live Internet pay-per-view. The iPPV was called "The Mad Man Takes Over Mexico!" and was aired on July 3, 2011. American hardcore wrestler Mad Man Pondo was the headliner in this show.

On July 15, 2011, Richter announced that IWL will incorporate a timekeeper, a ringbell and time limit for the matches, something that is common in the United States and Japan, but unheard of in Mexico. On January 4, 2012, Richter announced that she had parted ways with IWL due to creative differences.

== Chief Executive Officer ==
Name	Since	Until
Octavio Rivero	August 13, 2010	November 14, 2010
Ángeles Rubio	November 14, 2010	April 4, 2011
Fantasma de la Ópera	April 4, 2011	May 28, 2011
Valerie Richter	May 28, 2011	January 4, 2012

== Championships ==
=== IWL World Heavyweight Championship ===
Key
No.	Overall reign number
Reign	Reign number for the specific champion
Days	Number of days held
+	Current reign is changing daily

No.	Champion	Championship change			Reign statistics		Notes	Ref.
No.	Champion	Date	Event	Location	Reign	Days	Notes	Ref.
1	L.A. Park	September 14, 2013	Aniversario 3	Tlalnepantla, State of Mexico	1	17	Park defeated Dr. Wagner Jr., El Canek and Justin Credible in a four-way elimination match to become the inaugural champion.	
2	Dr. Wagner Jr.	October 1, 2013	IWL show	Pachuca, Hidalgo	1	4,564+	This was a five-way match, also involving El Canek, Super Crazy and Villano IV.	

=== IWL International Championship ===
Key
No.	Overall reign number
Reign	Reign number for the specific champion
Days	Number of days held
+	Current reign is changing daily

No.	Champion	Championship change			Reign statistics		Notes	Ref.
No.	Champion	Date	Event	Location	Reign	Days	Notes	Ref.
1	Super Crazy	September 14, 2013	Aniversario 3	Tlalnepantla, State of Mexico	1	4,581+	Crazy defeated Flamita, Fresero Jr., Loco Max, Mike Segura, Ninja de Fuego, Pesadilla, Super Mega, Tony Rivera, Ultimo Gladiador, Zumbi and Zumbido in a Lighttubes Ladders And Chairs Match to become the inaugural champion.	

=== IWL International Junior Heavyweight Championship ===
Name	Years
IWL Internet Championship	September 25, 2010 - July 31, 2011
IWL International Junior Heavyweight Championship	July 31, 2011 – Present

Key
No.	Overall reign number
Reign	Reign number for the specific champion
Days	Number of days held
+	Current reign is changing daily

No.	Champion	Championship change			Reign statistics		Notes	Ref.
No.	Champion	Date	Event	Location	Reign	Days	Notes	Ref.
1	Daga	September 25, 2010	IWL Show	Tlalnepantla, State of Mexico	1	386	Daga defeated Aeroboy, Black Fire, Eterno, Fantasma de la Ópera, Freelance, Lobo Metálico, Low Rider, Mike Segura, Naruto, Tormento, and Violento Jack in a Tables, Ladders, and Chairs match to become the inaugural champion.	
—	Vacated	October 15, 2011	—	—	—	—	Daga vacated the title when was defeated by ROH World Champion Davey Richards during a losing streak of several weeks.	
2	Mike Segura	October 22, 2011	N/A	Tlalnepantla, State of Mexico	1	252	Defeated Joe Líder and Low Rider in a three-way match to win the vacant title.	
3	Cerebro Negro	June 30, 2012	IWL Armagedon	Tlalnepantla, State of Mexico	1	319	This was a three-way match, also involving Aeroboy.	
4	Astro Latino	May 15, 2013	IWL/XIWG Event	San Louis Potosi, San Louis Potosi	1	105		
5	Carta Brava, Jr.	August 27, 2013	IWL show	Pachuca, Hidalgo, Mexico	1	4,599+	Five-Way Match that also included El Pantera I, Freelance and Mike Segura	

=== IWL International Tag Team Championship ===
Name	Years
IWL Tag Team Championship	November 28, 2010 - October 5, 2011
IWL International Tag Team Championship	October 5, 2011 – Present

Key
No.	Overall reign number
Reign	Reign number for the specific champion
Days	Number of days held
+	Current reign is changing daily

No.	Champion	Championship change			Reign statistics		Notes	Ref.
No.	Champion	Date	Event	Location	Reign	Days	Notes	Ref.
1	Los Perros del Mal (Bestia 666 and X-Fly)	November 28, 2010	IWL Show	Cuautitlán Izcalli, State of Mexico	1	311	Los Perros del Mal defeated Los Traumas (Trauma I and Trauma II) in the final of an eight team tournament to become the inaugural champions.	
—	Vacated	October 5, 2011	—	—	—	—	After Bestia 666 and X-Fly had on multiple occasions defended the title without IWL's authorization, the promotion announced that they would no longer recognize the title and would have it replaced by the new IWL International Tag Team Championship.	
2	Scorpio, Jr. and Super Crazy	October 22, 2011	IWL Oktoberfest	Tlalnepantla, State of Mexico	1	557	Scorpio, Jr. and Super Crazy defeated the team of Aero Star and Electroshock to win the vacant title.	
—	Vacated	May 2011	—	—	—	—	Announced on IWL Official's Facebook	
3	Ultimo Gladiador and Ultimo Vampiro	June 16, 2013	IWL Oktoberfest	Huehuetoca, State of Mexico	1	145	Defeated Los Piratas (El Hijo de Pirata Morgan and Pirata Morgan), Scorpio Jr. and Zumbido and Tony Rivera and Veneno to win the vacant championship.	
—	Vacated	November 5, 2011	—	—	—	—	The IWL explained that Ultimo Gladiador its share some days earlier gave back to the title, so declared the title vacant.	
4	Dinamic Black and Fresero Jr.	November 5, 2013	IWL show	Hidalgo, State of Mexico	1	4,529+	Defeated Mascara Jr. and Último Vampiro to win the vacant title.	

=== IWL Trios Championship ===
Key
No.	Overall reign number
Reign	Reign number for the specific champion
Days	Number of days held
+	Current reign is changing daily

No.	Champion	Championship change			Reign statistics		Notes	Ref.
No.	Champion	Date	Event	Location	Reign	Days	Notes	Ref.
1	Los Porros (Angel o Demonio, León Rojo and Obett)	November 14, 2010	IWL Barrio Tour 3	Cuautitlán Izcalli, Mexico State	1	559	Los Porros defeated La Secta Negra (Cerebro Negro, Fantasma de la Ópera and Radge) in the final of one night "Cuadrangular de Tríos" to become the inaugural champions.	
2	Los Psycho Circus (Monster Clown, Murder Clown and Psycho Clown)	May 26, 2012	IWL Show	Tlalnepantla de Baz, Mexico State	1	228		
3	Los Porros (Angel o Demonio, León Rojo and Obett)	October 3, 2010	IWL show	Huehuetoca, State of Mexico	2	90	Four Way match also included Coco Amarillo, Coco Blanco and Cocolores and Infierno Kid, Ojo Diabolico Jr. and Ultimo Vampiro	
4	Los Psycho Circus (Monster Clown, Murder Clown and Psycho Clown)	June 8, 2012	IWL Show	Atizapan de Zaragoza, State of Mexico	2	10		
5	Los Porros (Angel o Demonio, León Rojo and Obett)	June 18, 2013	N/A	N/A	3	179		
6	Dement Xtreme, Aero Boy and Violento Jack	December 14, 2013	IWL show	Tampico, Tamulipas	1	4490+		

=== IWL Internet Championship ===
Key
No.	Overall reign number
Reign	Reign number for the specific champion
Days	Number of days held
+	Current reign is changing daily

No.	Champion	Championship change			Reign statistics		Notes	Ref.
No.	Champion	Date	Event	Location	Reign	Days	Notes	Ref.
1	Ninja de Fuego	June 30, 2012	IWL Armagedon	Tlalnepantla, State of Mexico	1	294	Defeated Arkanos and Carrona and Centinela and Freeyser and Impulso and Infierno Kid Jr. and Terror to become the inaugural champion.	
2	Perico	April 20, 2013	IWL show	Atizapan de Zaragoza, State of Mexico	1	4,728+		

=== IWL Lightweight Championship ===
Key
No.	Overall reign number
Reign	Reign number for the specific champion
Days	Number of days held
+	Current reign is changing daily

No.	Champion	Championship change			Reign statistics		Notes	Ref.
No.	Champion	Date	Event	Location	Reign	Days	Notes	Ref.
1	The Medic's III	June 18, 2010	IWL show	Pachuca, Hidalgo, Mexico	1	4,669+	Defeated Atomic Star, Corcel Infernal, Pequeno Demonio, Shadow, Super Colt and Templario in a Seven Way Elimination Match to become the inaugural champion.	

== Tournaments ==
Name	Wrestler	Date
Hardcore Rumble	Angel o Demonio	September 17, 2011
Copa Santa Cecilia Acatitlán	Low Rider	November 27, 2010
Copa Aérea Rodeo Santa Fe	Freelance	October 22, 2011

== See also ==
- List of professional wrestling promotions in Mexico

== Sources ==
- Official Facebook
- IWL President Facebook
