= Festival de las Máscaras (2009) =

2009 International Wrestling Revolution Group event

- Promotion: International Wrestling Revolution Group
- Date: August 20, 2009
- City: Naucalpan, State of Mexico
- Venue: Arena Naucalpan

Event chronology
← Previous; Rey del Ring	Next → 25 Años de Scorpio Jr.

IWRG Festival de las Máscaras chronology
← Previous; 2008	Next → 2010

The 2009 Festival de las Máscaras (Spanish for "Festival of the Mask") was a major lucha libre event produced and scripted by the Mexican International Wrestling Revolution Group (IWRG) professional wrestling promotion on August 20, 2009. The show was held in Arena Naucalpan, Naucalpan, State of Mexico, which is IWRG's primary venue. The 2009 event was only the second time IWRG held a Festival de las Máscaras, which would become an annual tradition.

Most of the competitors on the show had previously lost their mask and for one night only were allowed to wrestle wearing them. The previously unmasked wrestlers on the show were Cerebro Negro, Dr. Cerebro, Orito, Panterita, El Signo, Pantera, Ricky Cruz, Scorpio Jr., Rambo, Veneno, Kahoz, Máscara Año 2000, Sangre Chicana, Mano Negra and Villano III. In the main event of the five match show the team of Kahoz, Máscara Año Dos Mil and Sangre Chicana defeated El Fantasma, Mano Negra and Villano III

== Production ==
=== Background ===
The wrestling mask has always held a sacred place in lucha libre, carrying with it a mystique and anonymity beyond what it means to wrestlers elsewhere in the world. The ultimate humiliation a luchador can suffer is to lose a Lucha de Apuestas, or bet match. Following a loss in a Lucha de Apuesta match the masked wrestler would be forced to unmask, state their real name and then would be unable to wear that mask while wrestling anywhere in Mexico. Since 2007 the Mexican wrestling promotion International Wrestling Revolution Group (IWRG; Sometimes referred to as Grupo Internacional Revolución in Spanish) has held a special annual show where they received a waiver to the rule from the State of Mexico Wrestling Commission and wrestlers would be allowed to wear the mask they previously lost in a Lucha de Apuestas.

The annual IWRG Festival de las Máscaras ("Festival of the Masks") event is also partly a celebration or homage of lucha libre history with IWRG honoring wrestlers of the past at the events similar to Consejo Mundial de Lucha Libre's (CMLL) Homenaje a Dos Leyendas ("Homage to Two Legends") annual shows. The IWRG's Festival de las Máscaras shows, as well as the majority of the major IWRG shows in general, are held in Arena Naucalpan, owned by the promoters of IWRG and is their main venue. The 2009 Festival de las Máscaras show was the second year that IWRG held the show.

IWRG regular Ricardo Antonio Morales Gonzalez, better known under the ring name Cerebro Negro (Spanish for "Black Brain"), adopted the "Cerebro Negro" enmascarado, or "masked wrestler", character in 2002 after having first worked as "Guerra C-3". For three years he wore and successfully defended his mask, until the 2005 El Castillo del Terror ("The Tower of Terror") show. Cerebro Negro was the last competitor in a steel cage match as Japanese wrestler Masada climbed out of the cage. As a result, he was forced to unmask. Cerebro Negro's long time tag team partner Dr. Cerebro also began his career as an enmascarado in 1996. Over the year he would work primarily for IWRG, at times risking his mask in various matches. On March 1, 2001, he lost a Lucha de Apuestas match to El Hijo del Santo and was forced to unmask. Mike Segura initially worked under a mask using the name "Orito" ("Little Oro) working for Consejo Mundial de Lucha Libre (CMLL) in their Mini-Estrellas division. Once he left CMLL he modified the name to "Oro Jr." as he began working against regular sized opponents. On July 26, 1998, Oro Jr. lost his mask to Dr. Cerebro, and subsequently began working as "Mike Segura" instead, only returning to the Orito/Oro Jr. name for special occasions. Like his partner for the Festival de las Máscaras show Marco Antonio Soto Ceja, better known as Freelance also began his career in the Mini-Estrella division working as "Panterita" ("Little Panther"). On August 6, 2006, he lost a Lucha de Apuestas match to Cerebro Negro and had to unmask. At that point in time he abandoned the Panterita ring character and became known as "Freelance".

El Signo only wrestled as a masked wrestler for a couple of years early in his career, before he lost a Lucha de Apuestas match to Gatúbedo and had to remove his mask in 1974. His career take off in the years after his unmasking as he teamed up with El Texano and Negro Navarro to for Los Misioneros de la Muerte ("The Missionaries of Death"), credited with the popularity of the six-man tag team match in the early 1980s.

Wrestler Pantera began his career in 1985, initially working as "Pantera II", but later became simply "Pantera" as Pantera I disappeared from the wrestling scene. On July 14, 2006, Pantera lost a Luchas de Apuestas match to Misterioso Jr. and was forced to unmask. Unlike most other wrestlers Pantera would later wrestle with the Pantera mask once more, initially first in the United States and Japan where he was not bound by the Mexican lucha libre commission rules. Over the summer of 2008 Panamanian wrestler Ricky Cruzz travelled to Mexico and worked for IWRG as an enmascarado but lost his mask June 12, 2006 in a steel cage match when he was defeated by El Hijo del Aníbal, unmasking before he returned to Puerto Rico.

Rafael Núñez Juan took the name Scorpio Jr. in honor of his father El Scorpio and from the mid-1980s until March 19, 1999, worked as an enmascarado. On March 19 Scorpio Jr. and Bestia Salvaje lost a tag team Lucha de Apuestas to Negro Casas and El Hijo del Santo in the main event of the 1999 Homenaje a Dos Leyendas show. Panamania wrestler Rafael Ernesto Medina Baeza started working as the masked character "Veneno" (Spanish for "Venom") in 2000 when he began to work for CMLL in Mexico. In CMLL he was part of Los Boricuas and through that association he was matched up against former Los Boricuas member Gran Markus Jr. in a long-running storyline. The two met at the 2002 Homenaje a Dos Leyendas show where Gran Markus Jr. defeated Veneno, forcing him to unmask as a result.

José Luis Mendieta Rodríguez began wrestling as a masked soldier character known as "Rambo" in 1981 working primarily for the Universal Wrestling Association as a rudo. On September 24, 1993, he lost a Lucha de Apuestas match to Villano III and was forced to unmask. Máscara Año 2000, lost his mask to Perro Aguayo in the main event of AAA'a Triplemanía event. Sangre Chicana started out his career as a masked wrestler, but his mask loss to Fishman in 1977 was just the start of his rise in lucha libre, earning a reputation as an unpredictable brawler. For years Jesús Reza Rosales wrestled as the masked Mano Negra ("Black Hand"), making his debut in 1971. His Lucha de Apuestas loss to Atlantis was the main event of the CMLL 60th Anniversary Show.

Villano III was the first of the five Villanos to lose his mask, his older brothers Villano I and Villano II never lost their mask in the ring. Villano III agreed to lose his mask to Atlantis as part of CMLL's 2000 Juicio Final ("Final Judgement") show on March 17, 2000. The match would later be called "The biggest Apuesta match of the decade" by several wrestling magazines. The match was voted the 2000 Match of the Year in the Wrestling Observer Newsletter awards.

=== Storylines ===
The event featured five professional wrestling matches with different wrestlers involved in pre-existing scripted feuds, plots and storylines. Wrestlers were portrayed as either heels (referred to as rudos in Mexico, those that portray the "bad guys") or faces (técnicos in Mexico, the "good guy" characters) as they followed a series of tension-building events, which culminated in a wrestling match or series of matches.

== Event ==
During the event IWRG officials, wrestlers and fans in the arena paid homage to wrestler El Matemático for his fifty-year career, making his debut on May 2, 1958. The crowd gave him a standing ovation as he was presented with a trophy and then addressed the crowd.

== Results ==
No.	Results	Stipulations
1	Eragon defeated Blasfemia	Best two-out-of-three falls match
2	Cerebro Negro and Dr. Cerebro defeated Orito and Panterita	Best two-out-of-three-falls tag team match
3	Los Misioneros de la Muerte (El Signo and Negro Navarro) defeated Los Temerarios (Black Terry and Shu el Guerrero)	Best two-out-of-three-falls six-man tag team match
4	El Pantera, Ricky Cruzz and Scorpio Jr. defeated Kraneo, Rambo and El Veneno by disqualification	Best two-out-of-three-falls six-man tag team match
5	Kahoz, Máscara Año 2000 and Sangre Chicana defeated El Fantasma, Mano Negra and Villano III	Best two-out-of-three-falls six-man tag team match
