= UWA World Heavyweight Championship =

Professional wrestling championship

- The front of the championship belt

Details
- Promotion: Universal Wrestling Association; Mexican independent circuit
- Date established: August 15, 1977
- Date retired: October 7, 2011
Statistics
- First champion: Lou Thesz
- Final champion: Dr. Wagner, Jr.
- Most reigns: El Canek (15 reigns)
- Longest reign: Dr. Wagner, Jr. (2667 days)
- Shortest reign: Yamato (4 days)

The UWA World Heavyweight Championship (Campeonato Mundial peso Completo de UWA in Spanish) was a professional wrestling world heavyweight championship originally promoted by Universal Wrestling Association (UWA) until it closed in 1995. After UWA's closure, the title was sporadically, unofficially defended on the Mexican independent circuit. In the past the title has been defended in Consejo Mundial de Lucha Libre (CMLL) and Asistencia Asesoría y Administración (AAA) when the champion worked for those companies. Lou Thesz was the first UWA World Heavyweight champion, having been awarded the title after wrestling Mil Mascaras to a draw on the very first UWA show. El Canek has held the Championship the most times, 15 reigns all in all, 13 of those before the UWA closed. Canek is also the one that kept the championship active after the UWA closed, defending it on the independent circuit. Dr. Wagner, Jr. was the final UWA World Heavyweight champion having defeated Canek on June 18, 2004. During Dr. Wagner, Jr's time in AAA, they sometimes acknowledged the title, having had shown him with the belt on numerous occasions.

As it was a professional wrestling championship, the championship was not won not by actual competition, but by a scripted ending to a match determined by the bookers and match makers. (Note: Hornbaker (2016) p. 550: "Professional wrestling is a sport in which match finishes are predetermined. Thus, win–loss records are not indicative of a wrestler's genuine success based on their legitimate abilities – but on now much, or how little they were pushed by promoters") On occasion the promotion declares a championship vacant, which means there is no champion at that point in time. This can either be due to a storyline, (Note: Duncan & Will (2000) p. 271, Chapter: Texas: NWA American Tag Team Title [World Class, Adkisson] "Championship held up and rematch ordered because of the interference of manager Gary Hart") or real life issues such as a champion suffering an injury being unable to defend the championship, (Note: Duncan & Will (2000) p. 20, Chapter: (United States: 19th Century & widely defended titles – NWA, WWF, AWA, IW, ECW, NWA) NWA/WCW TV Title "Rhodes stripped on 85/10/19 for not defending the belt after having his leg broken by Ric Flair and Ole & Arn Anderson") or leaving the company. (Note: Duncan & Will (2000) p. 201, Chapter: (Memphis, Nashville) Memphis: USWA Tag Team Title "Vacant on 93/01/18 when Spike leaves the USWA.")

== Title history ==
Key
No.	Overall reign number
Reign	Reign number for the specific champion
Days	Number of days held
N/A	Unknown information
†	Championship change is unrecognized by the promotion
+	Current reign is changing daily

No.	Champion	Championship change			Reign statistics		Notes	Ref.
No.	Champion	Date	Event	Location	Reign	Days	Notes	Ref.
Universal Wrestling Association (UWA)
1	Lou Thesz	August 15, 1977	Live event	N/A	1	377	Thesz was awarded the title after wrestling Mil Máscaras to a time limit draw at the UWA's first event on July 26, 1976.	(Note: Duncan & Will (2000) p. 397, Chapter: MEXICO: UWA World Heavyweight Title [Flores, Mora])
2	El Canek	August 27, 1978	Live event	Mexico City	1	539		
3	Tiger Jeet Singh	February 17, 1980	Live event	Mexico City	1	56		
4	Antonio Inoki	April 13, 1980	Live event	Mexico City	1	194		
5	Tiger Jeet Singh	October 24, 1980	Live event	Okinawa, Japan	2	114	This title change was via disqualification	
6	El Canek	February 15, 1981	Live event	Naucalpan, State of Mexico	2	523		
7	Riki Choshu	July 23, 1982	Live event	Mexico City	1	65		
8	El Canek	September 26, 1982	Live event	Mexico City	3	219		
9	Tatsumi Fujinami	May 1, 1983	Live event	Mexico City	1	42		
10	El Canek	June 12, 1983	Live event	Mexico City	4	252		
—	Vacated	October 4, 1983	—	—	—	—	El Canek vacated the title to do an extended tour of wrestling in Japan. Tour is cut short and Canek returns in time for the tournament.	
11	Enrique Vera	October 23, 1983	Live event	Naucalpan, State of Mexico	1	126	Defeated El Canek and Dos Caras to win the vacant championship.	
12	Dos Caras	February 26, 1984	Live event	Naucalpan, State of Mexico	1	119		
13	El Canek	June 24, 1984	Live event	Naucalpan, State of Mexico	5	310		
14	Scorpio	April 30, 1985	Live event	Mexico City	1	61		
15	El Canek	June 30, 1985	Live event	N/A	6	548		
16	Dos Caras	December 30, 1986	Live event	Naucalpan, State of Mexico	2			
17	El Canek	April 1987 (NLT)	Live event	N/A	7			
18	The Killer	1987	Live event	N/A	1			
19	El Canek	1987	Live event	N/A	8			
20	Perro Aguayo	March 4, 1988	Live event	N/A	1	62		
21	El Canek	May 5, 1988	Live event	N/A	9	566		
22	Big Van Vader	November 22, 1989	Live event	Naucalpan, State of Mexico	1	382		
23	El Canek	December 9, 1990	Live event	Naucalpan, State of Mexico	10	420		
24	Dos Caras	February 2, 1992	Live event	Naucalpan, State of Mexico	3	154		
25	El Canek	July 5, 1992	Live event	Naucalpan, State of Mexico	11	210		
26	Canadian Vampire Casanova	January 31, 1993	Live event	Naucalpan, State of Mexico	1	322		
27	El Canek	December 19, 1993	Live event	Naucalpan, State of Mexico	12	75		
28	Yamato	March 14, 1994	Live event	Puebla, Puebla	1	4		
29	El Canek	March 18, 1994	UWA Live event	Nezahualcóyotl, México	13	1976	The UWA closed in 1995, however the title continued to be defended in other promotions.	
Mexican independent circuit
30	Cadaver de Ultratumba	August 15, 1999	Live event	Tehuacán, Puebla	1	22		
31	El Canek	September 6, 1999	AAA TV Taping	Tehuacán, Puebla	14	867		
32	Cibernético	January 20, 2002	AAA TV Taping	Salamanca, Guanajuato	1	299		
33	El Canek	November 15, 2002	AAA TV Taping	Orizaba, Veracruz	15	581		
34	Dr. Wagner Jr.	June 18, 2004	CMLL Infierno en el Ring (2004)	Mexico City	1	2667	This was a Consejo Mundial de Lucha Libre event.	
—	Deactivated	October 7, 2011	—	—	—	—	The championship goes dormant following Dr. Wagner's successful defence against L.A. Park.	

== Combined reigns ==
¤	The exact length of the title reign is uncertain.

Rank	Wrestler	No. of reigns	Combined days
1	El Canek	15	7,086¤
2	Dr. Wagner Jr.	1	2,667
3	Big Van Vader	1	382
4	Lou Thesz	1	377
5	Canadian Vampire Casanova	1	322
6	Cibernético	1	299
7	Dos Caras	3	273¤
8	Antonio Inoki	1	194
9	Tiger Jeet Singh	2	170
10	Enrique Vera	1	126
11	Riki Choshu	1	65
12	Perro Aguayo	1	62
13	Scorpio	1	61
14	Tatsumi Fujinami	1	42
15	Cadaver de Ultratumba	1	22
16	Yamato	1	4
17	The Killer	1	N/A¤
