= CMLL 71st Anniversary Show =

Mexican Professional wrestling show

CMLL 71st Anniversary show
- Poster for the event
- Promotion: Consejo Mundial de Lucha Libre
- Date: September 17, 2004
- City: Mexico City, Mexico
- Venue: Arena México
- Attendance: 17,000

Event chronology
| ← Previous; Torneo Gran Alternativa | Next → Leyenda de Azul |

CMLL Anniversary Shows chronology
| ← Previous; 70th Anniversary | Next → 72nd Anniversary |

The CMLL 71st Anniversary Show was a professional wrestling major show event produced by Consejo Mundial de Lucha Libre (CMLL) that took place on September 17, 2004, in Arena México, Mexico City, Mexico. The event commemorated the 71st anniversary of CMLL, the oldest professional wrestling promotion in the world. The Anniversary show is CMLL's biggest show of the year, their Super Bowl event. The CMLL Anniversary Show series is the longest-running annual professional wrestling show, starting in 1934.

The show consisted of six matches, with the main event being a Lucha de Apuestas, elimination match where all four competitors put their mask on the line. The competitors were Rayo de Jalisco Jr., Dr. Wagner Jr., Universo 2000 and Canek. It also featured four Six-man tag team matches, including a Mini-Estrella match. The show also featured CMLL World Light Heavyweight Champion Último Guerrero defending the title against L.A. Park.

== Production ==
=== Background ===
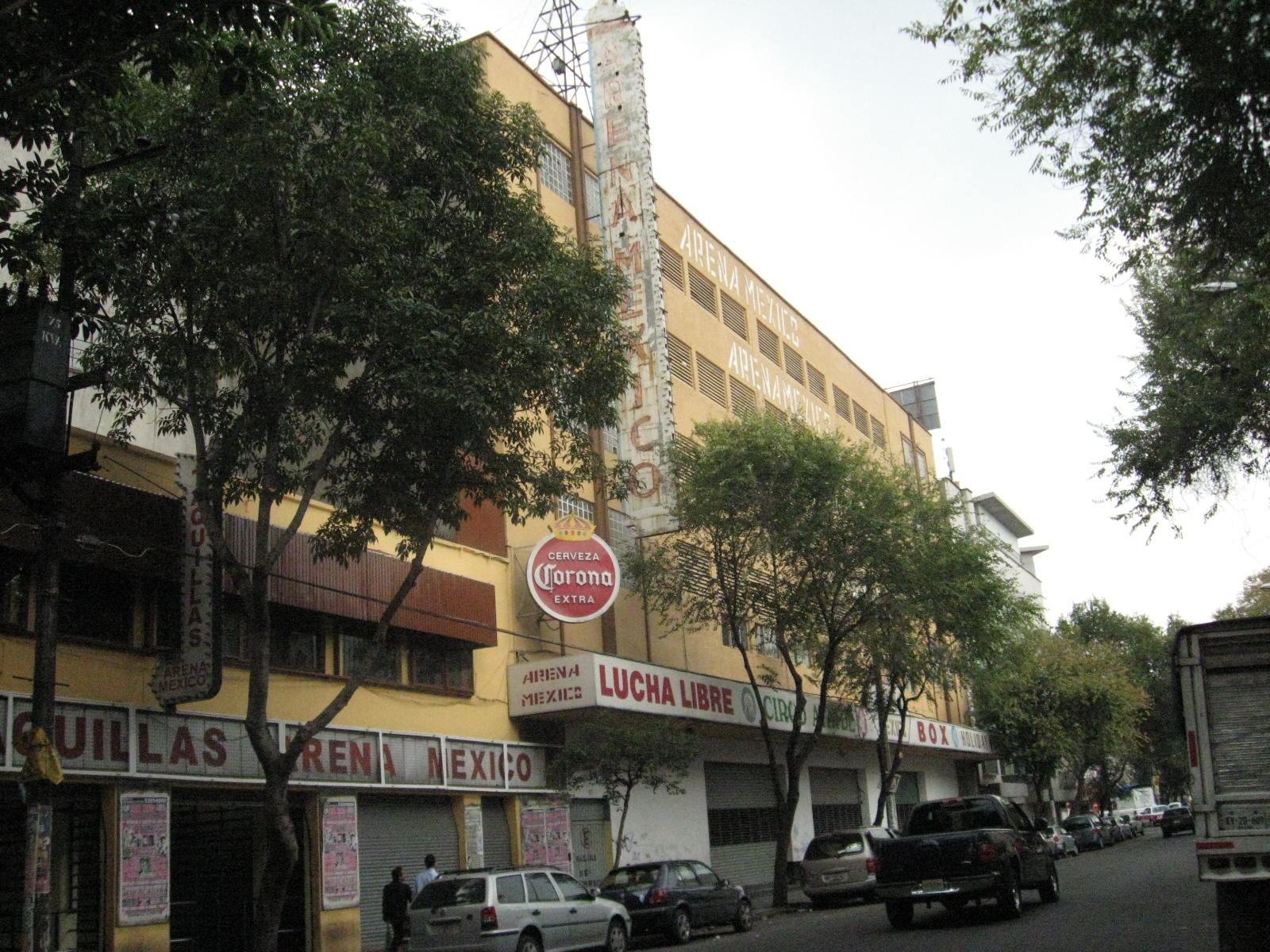
Arena México, CMLL's main venue and location of the Anniversary Show

The Mexican Lucha libre (professional wrestling) company Consejo Mundial de Lucha Libre (CMLL) started out under the name Empresa Mexicana de Lucha Libre ("Mexican Wrestling Company"; EMLL), founded by Salvador Lutteroth in 1933. Lutteroth, inspired by professional wrestling shows he had attended in Texas, decided to become a wrestling promoter and held his first show on September 21, 1933, marking what would be the beginning of organized professional wrestling in Mexico. Lutteroth would later become known as "the father of Lucha Libre" . A year later EMLL held the EMLL 1st Anniversary Show, starting the annual tradition of the Consejo Mundial de Lucha Libre Anniversary Shows that have been held each year ever since, most commonly in September.

Over the years the anniversary show would become the biggest show of the year for CMLL, akin to the Super Bowl for the National Football League (NFL) or WWE's WrestleMania event. The first anniversary show was held in Arena Modelo, which Lutteroth had bought after starting EMLL. In 1942–43 Lutteroth financed the construction of Arena Coliseo, which opened in April 1943. The EMLL 10th Anniversary Show was the first of the anniversary shows to be held in Arena Coliseo. In 1956 Lutteroth had Arena México built in the location of the original Arena Modelo, making Arena México the main venue of EMLL from that point on. Starting with the EMLL 23rd Anniversary Show, all anniversary shows except for the EMLL 46th Anniversary Show have been held in the arena that would become known as "The Cathedral of Lucha Libre". On occasion EMLL held more than one show labelled as their "Anniversary" show, such as two 33rd Anniversary Shows in 1966. Over time the anniversary show series became the oldest, longest-running annual professional wrestling show. In comparison, WWE's WrestleMania is only the fourth oldest still promoted show (CMLL's Arena Coliseo Anniversary Show and Arena México anniversary shows being second and third). EMLL was supposed to hold the EMLL 52nd Anniversary Show on September 20, 1985, but Mexico City was hit by a magnitude 8.0 earthquake. EMLL canceled the event both because of the general devastation but also over fears that Arena México might not be structurally sound after the earthquake.

When Jim Crockett Promotions was bought by Ted Turner in 1988 EMLL became the oldest still active promotion in the world. In 1991 EMLL was rebranded as "Consejo Mundial de Lucha Libre" and thus held the CMLL 59th Anniversary Show, the first under the new name, on September 18, 1992. Traditionally CMLL holds their major events on Friday Nights, replacing their regularly scheduled Super Viernes show.

=== Storylines ===
The event featured six professional wrestling matches with different wrestlers involved in pre-existing scripted feuds, plots and storylines. Wrestlers were portrayed as either heels (referred to as rudos in Mexico, those that portray the "bad guys") or faces (técnicos in Mexico, the "good guy" characters) as they followed a series of tension-building events, which culminated in a wrestling match or series of matches.

== Results ==
| No. | Results | Stipulations | Times |
|---|---|---|---|
| 1 | Mascarita Sagrada, Shockercito and Tzuki defeated Espectrito, Fire and Pequeño Violencia - two falls to one | Six-man "Lucha Libre rules" tag team match | 18:00 |
| 2 | Místico, Misterioso II and Volador Jr. defeated Averno, Mephisto and Olímpico - two falls to one | Six-man "Lucha Libre rules" tag team match | 11:19 |
| 3 | Atlantis, Blue Panther and Máscara Sagrada defeated Pierroth Jr., Tarzan Boy and Vampiro - two falls to one | Six-man "Lucha Libre rules" tag team match | 15:03 |
| 4 | Último Guerrero defeated L.A. Park - two falls to one | Singles match for the CMLL World Light Heavyweight Championship | 15:55 |
| 5 | Los Perros del Mal (Perro Aguayo Jr., El Terrible and Héctor Garza) defeated El Hijo del Santo, Negro Casas and Shocker - two falls to one | Six-man "Lucha Libre rules" tag team match | 13:37 |
| 6 | Universo 2000 lost to Canek, also in the match: Dr. Wagner Jr. and Rayo de Jalisco Jr. | Four-way Lucha de Apuesta mask vs. mask elimination match. | 19:50 |
