= Dr. Wagner Jr. =

Mexican professional wrestler

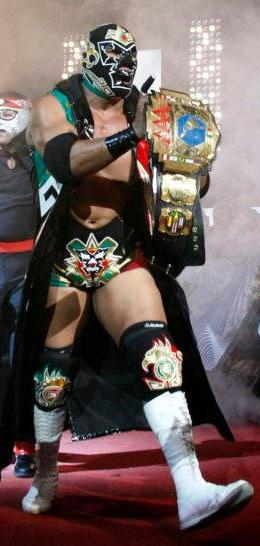
- Wagner with the AAA Latin American Championship in 2011

Personal information
- Born: Juan Manuel González Barrón; August 12, 1965 (age 61) Torreón, Coahuila, Mexico
- Children: El Hijo de Dr. Wagner Jr. Galeno
- Parent: Dr. Wagner (father)
- Family: Silver King (brother)

Professional wrestling career
- Ring name(s): El Invasor; Dr. Wagner Jr. Rey Wagner
- Billed height: 177 cm (5 ft 10 in)
- Billed weight: 98 kg (216 lb)
- Billed from: Torreón, Coahuila
- Trained by: Dr. Wagner; Gran Markus
- Debut: April 6, 1986

Juan Manuel González Barrón (born August 12, 1965) is a Mexican professional wrestler, who is best known under the ring name Dr. Wagner Jr., having used that name since 1987. He is the son of Manuel González Rivera, better known as Dr. Wagner, and the brother of the late César Cuauhtémoc González Barrón, who worked primarily under the name Silver King. His son made his professional wrestling debut in 2009 under the ring name El Hijo de Dr. Wagner Jr.. González was once married to professional wrestler María Moreno León, better known as Rossy Moreno.

While he has worked all over the world as Dr. Wagner Jr., he primarily works in Mexico and has worked with both Consejo Mundial de Lucha Libre (CMLL) and Lucha Libre AAA Worldwide (AAA), Mexico's two largest professional wrestling promotions, on multiple occasions, as well as being a regular on the Mexican independent circuit. He was introduced to Lucha Underground at the end of season two and has worked for various Japanese promotions, most notably for New Japan Pro-Wrestling (NJPW).

During his career, he has won such notable championships as the AAA Mega Championship on three occasions, been the inaugural AAA Latin American Champion, held the CMLL World Light Heavyweight Championship twice, the CMLL World Tag Team Championship on four occasions with four partners, the CMLL World Trios Championship four times (as part of four teams), the NWA World Light Heavyweight Championship and the IWGP Junior Heavyweight Tag Team Championship with Kendo Kashin.

González worked under a mask from his debut in 1985 until August 2017, when he was forced to unmask after losing to Psycho Clown in a Lucha de Apuestas at Triplemanía XXV. Following the unmasking, González renamed himself Rey Wagner ("King Wagner").

== Personal life ==
Juan Manuel González Barrón was born on August 12, 1965, son of Magdalena Barrón and her husband Manuel González Rivera, better known as the professional wrestler Dr. Wagner. Juan González was the second son born, with his brother Óscar being two years his elder. His parents later had another son, César Cuauhtémoc González Barrón, and a daughter, Mayra. At one point in the late 1980s to 1990s, Juan González was married to María del Rocío Moreno León, who is also a professional wrestler under the name Rossy Moreno; together, the couple had at least two sons, El Hijo de Dr. Wagner Jr. and Galeno del Mal. Juan González' sons' names are not a matter of public knowledge as they wrestle as enmascarados, which traditionally means that their personal information are kept from the general public, per lucha libre traditions. Juan González later remarried, although it is unclear if his current wife is directly involved with lucha libre or not. In the early 2000s, César González introduced the wrestling world to a son, referred to only as "El Hijo de Silver King", who at the time was training to be a wrestler.

== Professional wrestling career ==
González started out working as a masked wrestler known as El Invasor ("The Invader"), allowing him to gain in-ring experience without the pressure of the Dr. Wagner name. He only worked as El Invasor for about a year before it was decided to reveal his family relationship. He was slated to make his in-ring debut as Dr. Wagner Jr. in a match where he would team up with his father against his former tag team partner Ángel Blanco and Ángel Blanco Jr. on April 27, 1986. While driving to the show, the car carrying his father, José Vargas (Ángel Blanco), El Solar, Mano Negra and Jungla Negra crashed when one of the tires exploded. Vargas was killed by the crash, and González' father suffered severe spinal damage. Manuel González would later use a wheelchair to accompany his son to the ring for some matches.

=== Universal Wrestling Association (1986–1993) ===
After adopting his father's name, Dr. Wagner Jr. began working for the Universal Wrestling Association (UWA), the same promotion where his father worked for most of his career. Promoters played off the rivalry of their famous fathers and often paired him against Ángel Blanco Jr. On August 3, 1986, the two rivals were teamed up for a Ruleta de la Muerte ("Roulette of Death") tournament, where the losing teams advance and the team that lost the finals would have to wrestle each other in a Lucha de Apuestas, or "bet match", for their masks. They defeated Mano Negra and Aníbal to survive the tournament with their masks intact. On July 22, 1990, Dr. Wagner Jr. defeated Astro de Oro to win the UWA World Junior Heavyweight Championship, his first professional wrestling championship. He held the title for 218 days, until February 25, 1991, when he lost it to Enrique Vega.

=== Consejo Mundial de Lucha Libre (1993–2009) ===
In the early 1990s, the UWA's popularity began to dwindle as less fans attended their shows. As a result, they began working with long-time rival promotion Consejo Mundial de Lucha Libre (CMLL), co-promoting shows and allowing UWA workers to also compete on their shows. On April 2, 1993, Dr. Wagner Jr. defeated Pierroth Jr. to win the CMLL World Light Heavyweight Championship. Later that year, the two promotions worked together to host a tournament for the newly created CMLL World Tag Team Championship, with Dr. Wagner Jr. and UWA's top name, El Canek, defeating CMLL's Vampiro and Pierroth Jr. in the finals to become the first CMLL World Tag Team Champions. Dr. Wagner Jr.'s first reign as CMLL World Light Heavyweight Champion ended on March 2, 1994, as he was defeated by Atlantis.

By early 1994, Dr. Wagner Jr. began teaming with Gran Markus Jr. and El Hijo del Gladiador as La Nueva Ola Blanca ("The New White Wave"), adopting the name of his father's tag team. La Nueva Ola Blanca won the CMLL World Trios Championship on April 22, defeating Los Brazos (El Brazo, Brazo de Oro and Brazo de Plata). In November of that year, El Canek stopped working for CMLL, forcing Dr. Wagner Jr. to give up his half of the world tag team championship. In early 1997, Dr. Wagner Jr. and his brother, Silver King, won the CMLL World Tag Team Championship, yet Wagner was forced to give up his half since Silver King left CMLL to work for World Championship Wrestling (WCW) in the United States. He later won the championship for a third time, this time with Emilio Charles Jr. as his partner. He then won the CMLL World Trios Championship on three additional occasions, first with Black Warrior and Blue Panther, then with Blue Panther and Fuerza Guerrera, and finally with Black Tiger (his brother under a new ring identity) and Universo 2000. In the main event of the CMLL 67th Anniversary Show on September 29, 2000, Dr. Wagner Jr. lost to Negro Casas in the semi-final of the Leyenda de Plata ("Silver Legend") tournament.

On June 18, 2004, Dr. Wagner Jr. defeated El Canek in Mexico City to win the UWA World Heavyweight Championship, a title still promoted ten years after the UWA closed. The championship change was part of a long running storyline between the two, which was set to culminate in a four-way Lucha de Apuestas at the CMLL 71st Anniversary Show on September 17. The week prior to the show, Manuel González died, which led to a surge of sympathy for Dr. Wagner Jr.; the crowd was solidly behind the until-then hated Dr. Wagner Jr. as he put his mask on the line against El Canek, Universo 2000 and Rayo de Jalisco Jr. In the end, El Canek, defeated Universo 2000 to take his mask. As result of the newfound popularity of Dr. Wagner Jr., CMLL decided to turn El Canek rudo (villain), allowing for the rivalry to continue. Later on, when Dr. Wagner Jr. moved on to a feud with Atlantis, the story repeated itself as the crowd turned against Atlantis, forcing CMLL to turn him from técnico (hero or good guy) into one of the bad guys of the storyline. The rivalry continued for several months until Dr. Wagner Jr.'s focus shifted to newcomer L.A. Park, resulting in a series of very violent, out of control matches between the two.

On April 27, 2008, Wagner led a protest march for anyone who believed they were being mistreated by their bosses to join. About 200 people joined the march, including Fuerza Guerrera and professional wrestlers from International Wrestling Revolution Group (IWRG). Wagner claimed he was not being used because he criticized CMLL in the press, and claimed he was in talks with World Wrestling Entertainment (WWE). The rivalry between Dr. Wagner Jr. and L.A. Park reached its climax at the CMLL 75th Anniversary Show on September 19, where their match ended in a disqualification due to excessive brawling outside the ring. A short time later, Dr. Wagner Jr. was officially fired from CMLL for breaking their strict rule about not bleeding during matches or using weapons.

=== Japan (1988–2004) ===
Starting in 1988, Dr. Wagner Jr. began making regular trips to Japan, primarily working for New Japan Pro-Wrestling (NJPW) through their relationship with the UWA, as well as Wrestling International New Generations (W*ING) and Big Japan Pro Wrestling (BJW). During a BJW tour in 1996, Dr. Wagner Jr. lost the CMLL World Light Heavyweight Championship to Aquarius, but regained it eight days later. The title change was not sanctioned by CMLL and not officially recognized in Mexico.

In 1997, Dr. Wagner Jr. participated in NJPW's Best of the Super Juniors IV tournament, where he defeated Doc Dean and Chavo Guerrero Jr., but lost the remaining four matches and failed to advance. The following year, Dr. Wagner Jr. was invited back for the 1998 Best of the Super Juniors, winning his block with a total of four victories, but lost in the finals to Koji Kanemoto. Later that year, he teamed up with Kendo Kashin to compete in a tournament for the newly created IWGP Junior Heavyweight Tag Team Championship, losing in the final to Shinjiro Otani and Tatsuhito Takaiwa. When Dr. Wagner Jr. returned to Japan in 1999, he and Kashin won the championship on January 4 at Wrestling World 1999 in the Tokyo Dome. The following month, Dr. Wagner Jr. unsuccessfully fought Jyushin Thunder Liger for the IWGP Junior Heavyweight Championship. The reign with the IWGP Junior Heavyweight Tag Team Championship ended after 96 days, with two successful defenses, when they lost to Liger and The Great Sasuke on April 10. For the third year in a row, Dr. Wagner Jr. competed in the Best of the Super Juniors, which was won by Kashin. On May 5, 2001, Dr. Wagner Jr. and Silver King unsuccessfully challenged Liger and El Samurai for the IWGP Junior Heavyweight Tag Team Championship at Wrestling Dontaku 2001.

In October 2003 and March 2004, Dr. Wagner Jr. and Silver King toured with All Japan Pro Wrestling (AJPW) instead of NJPW, working primarily as a tag team for the entirety of each tour. At the end of the first tour, Dr. Wagner Jr. unsuccessfully challenged Kashin for the AJPW World Junior Heavyweight Championship, while on the second, he and Silver King failed to win the All Asia Tag Team Championship from Great Kosuke and Shiryu.

=== Lucha Libre AAA Worldwide (2009–2013) ===
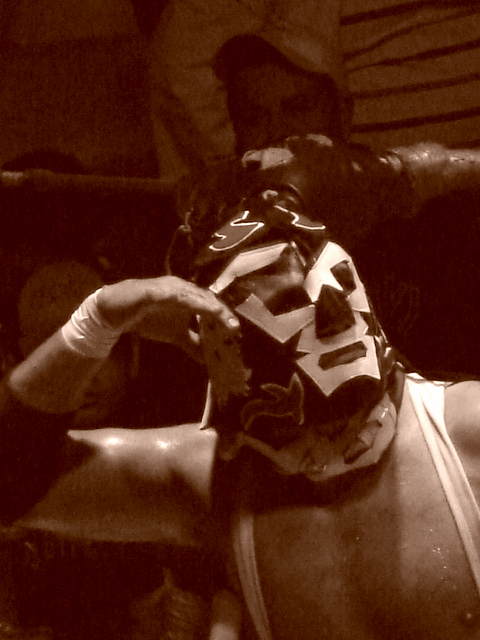
Close up of Dr. Wagner Jr. posing after a match

On March 15, 2009, Dr. Wagner Jr. made a surprise appearance for Lucha Libre AAA Worldwide (AAA) at Rey de Reyes ("King of Kings"), chasing off La Legión Extranjera, before challenging AAA Mega Champion El Mesías to a title match. At Triplemanía XVII on June 13, Dr. Wagner Jr. defeated Mesías to win the AAA Mega Championship, after which he signed a one-year exclusive contract with AAA. He also formed the stable Los Wagnermaniacos with Silver King, Electroshock and Último Gladiador. On August 21, Dr. Wagner Jr. successfully defended the championship against Mesías and Cibernético in a steel cage match at Verano de Escándalo ("Summer of Scandal"). At Héroes Inmortales III on September 26, he successfully defended the title against Mesías once more. Following two successful defenses against Mesías, Dr. Wagner Jr. stipulated that if Mesías lost at Guerra de Titanes ("War of the Titans") on December 11, he would not receive another title match. Dr. Wagner Jr. lost the title back to Mesías after holding it for 181 days.

In the aftermath of Electroshock winning the AAA Mega Championship at Rey de Reyes on March 2, 2010, he, Ultimo Gladiator and Silver King turned on Dr. Wagner Jr. and kicked him out of the stable, which they renamed Los Maniacos. At Triplemanía XVIII on June 6, Dr. Wagner Jr. pinned Electroshock for his second AAA Mega Championship. Following the match, Mesías came to the ring and presented him with the championship belt, and the two shook hands. On July 12, Dr. Wagner Jr. made a surprise appearance for CMLL, coming to the aid of his son, El Hijo de Dr. Wagner, at an event in Nuevo Laredo. Despite his AAA contract recently expiring, he claimed that he was still on good terms with the company and offered no explanation for his appearance. At Verano de Escándalo on August 14, Dr. Wagner Jr. successfully defended the title in a three-way match against Silver King and Vampiro. After the match, Silver King played an audio tape, claiming it was their late father saying that Silver King was the more talented brother. This revelation led to a match on October 1 at Héroes Inmortales IV, where he retained the title against Silver King. On October 31, Wagner Jr. formed a new alliance named Potencia Mundial (World Power) with Monster Clown, Murder Clown and Psycho Clown. At Guerra de Titanes on December 5, Dr. Wagner Jr. lost the AAA Mega Championship to El Zorro.

At Triplemanía XIX on June 18, 2011, Dr. Wagner Jr. defeated Total Nonstop Action Wrestling (TNA)'s Rob Van Dam to become the inaugural AAA Latin American Champion. Immediately afterwards, he began making challenges towards new AAA Mega Champion Jeff Jarrett. Wagner received his shot at the title on July 31 at Verano de Escándalo in a three-way match, also including L.A. Park, but was eliminated following a distraction from Karen Jarrett and a low blow from Jarrett. On October 9, at Héroes Inmortales, Dr. Wagner Jr. made his first successful AAA Latin American Championship defense against El Hijo del Perro Aguayo in a Bullterrier match. After the match, two of AAA's top técnicos and Wagner's allies, La Parka and Octagón, both turned on him and joined Aguayo's Los Perros del Mal. At Guerra de Titanes on December 16, Wagner Jr. lost the AAA Latin American Championship to L.A. Park.

In early 2012, Dr. Wagner Jr. started a rivalry with the invading El Consejo stable. On March 18, at Rey de Reyes, Wagner, Electroshock and Heavy Metal lost to El Consejo members Máscara Año 2000 Jr., El Texano Jr. and Toscano, with Máscara Año 2000 Jr. pinning Wagner following outside interference. The following month, Wagner made peace with Silver King as the two came together to battle El Consejo. On August 5, in the main event of Triplemanía XX, Dr. Wagner Jr. defeated Máscara Año 2000 Jr. in a mask vs. mask Lucha de Apuestas, forcing his rival to unmask himself. In early 2013, Wagner Jr., claiming dissatisfaction with his position in AAA, left the promotion for a several-month-long stint with El Hijo del Santo's Todo X el Todos promotion, only to return in May in time for Triplemanía XXI. At the event, Dr. Wagner Jr. teamed with Electroshock, La Parka and Octagón to defeat Canek, Máscara Año 2000, Universo 2000 and Villano IV. Afterwards, the relationship between Wagner and AAA once again broke down, with Wagner taking public potshots at the promotion.

=== Independent circuit (2013–2014) ===
On November 17, 2013, Wagner Jr. returned to CMLL at a small event in Naucalpan, confronting and challenging Mr. Niebla. For the past weeks, Wagner had teased "invading" CMLL and settling his score with the likes of Atlantis and Último Guerrero. In July 2014, Wagner worked a tour of Japan, during which he wrestled for Tokyo Gurentai and women's wrestling promotion World Wonder Ring Stardom.

=== Return to AAA (2014–2020) ===
A year after leaving AAA, on August 17, 2014, Wagner returned to take part in Triplemanía XXII, putting any past issues behind them. At the event, Wagner took part in a four-way elimination main event for the Copa Triplemanía XXII. He was the first man eliminated from the match by Cibernético. Dr. Wagner Jr. did not appear for AAA for the rest of the year until the Lucha Libre World Cup tournament in June 2016. Dr. Wagner Jr. teamed up with Rey Mysterio Jr. and Dragon Azteca Jr. as "Team Mexico International", but was eliminated in the second round. He returned to AAA in the fall, shortly after leaving CMLL, as he turned on former tag team partner Rey Mysterio Jr. On August 28, at Triplemanía XXIV, Wagner fought against El Texano Jr. and Brian Cage for the AAA Mega Championship, but lost. During the main event of the show, he disrupted a Lucha de Apuestas between Psycho Clown and Pagano, attacking Psycho Clown. After the match, which Psycho Clown won, Dr. Wagner Jr. challenged Psycho Clown to put his mask on the line in a Lucha de Apuestas at Triplemanía XXV, which Psycho Clown accepted. At Héroes Inmortales X on October 2, Dr. Wagner Jr. defeated Psycho Clown in a match also including Pagano, after Psycho Clown's tag team partners, Monster Clown and Murder Clown, turned on him and helped Dr. Wagner Jr. win the match.

On August 26, 2017, Dr. Wagner Jr. was defeated by Psycho Clown in a Lucha de Apuestas at Triplemanía XXV, being forced to unmask as a result. Afterwards, he continued working for AAA unmasked, using the new name "Rey Wagner" ("King Wagner"). After unsuccessfully challenging Johnny Mundo for the AAA Mega Championship on October 1 at Héroes Inmortales XI, Wagner defeated Mundo in a rematch at Guerra de Titanes on January 26, 2018, to win his third AAA Mega Championship. On June 4, at Verano de Escándalo, Wagner lost his title in a three-way match (also involving Rey Mysterio Jr.) to Jeff Jarrett, who made his return to the company, with the help of Konnan. Their rivalry led to a hair vs. hair Lucha de Apuestas at Héroes Inmortales XII on October 28, which Wagner won, forcing Jarrett to be shaved bald.

On August 3, 2019, at Triplemanía XXVII, Wagner lost a mask vs. hair Lucha de Apuestas to Blue Demon Jr., the culmination of a long-running storyline between the two. After the match, following his head being shaved, Wagner announced his retirement. However, the next day, Wagner clarified his situation, stating that he was not permanently retired and would have to meet the dates in both AAA and the independents. On August 10, Wagner announced that he finally canceled his retirement to continue his career. On February 2, 2020, Wagner officially announced his departure from the AAA after appearing at an event in the Naucalpan Arena after six years. However, he briefly returned for the Lucha Fighter tournament in April 2020.

On August 16, 2025, Wagner was shown at ringside during his son El Hijo de Dr. Wagner Jr.'s match against El Mesías at Triplemanía XXXIII. During the match, he attacked Dorian Roldán to prevent interference and later celebrated with his son following his victory.

=== Return to CMLL (2015) ===
In August 2015, Wagner made his return to CMLL after an almost seven-year absence. His tenure with CMLL was only brief, as Wagner was fired on September 11, reportedly after telling them that taking part in the 82nd Anniversary Show "didn't suit his interests". It was later reported that Wagner decided to not work the anniversary show out of loyalty to L.A. Park, who had been released by the promotion days earlier.

=== Lucha Underground (2016–2018) ===
On July 6, 2016, Wagner made his surprise debut for Lucha Underground, making an appearance at Ultima Lucha Dos as a surprise opponent for Son of Havoc. Dr. Wagner Jr. defeated Son of Havoc, with the storyline being that he won a cash prize of $250,000. During season 3, Dr. Wagner Jr. was managed by Famous B and worked a storyline feud with Son of Havoc and Mascarita Sagrada, who had previously been managed by Famous B. He also participated in the "Battle of the Bulls" tournament, but was eliminated by Cage. At Ultima Lucha Tres, Wagner returned and teamed with Famous B to defeat Texano, forcing him to become Famous B's new client. However, Wagner would not appear in the fourth season, and the series was discontinued after the season finale, Ultima Lucha Cuatro.

=== Return to the independent circuit (2020–present) ===
On December 6, 2020, Dr. Wagner Jr. forced Capo Mayor to be shaved bald after defeating him in a Lucha de Apuestas at an IWRG event. At Castillo del Terror ("Castle of Terror") on October 31, 2021, he put his hair on the line in a steel cage match, which saw him and Pirata Morgan Jr. as the final two wrestlers. In the end, Dr. Wagner Jr. defeated Morgan and forced him to have his hair shaved off. On February 5, 2022, he made his debut for Game Changer Wrestling (GCW) at If I Die First, defeating Joey Janela. Later that month, he defeated Homicide at Welcome to Heartbreak. On September 2, Dr. Wagner Jr. announced on a Milenio column that he would resume wearing his mask, despite losing it five years prior. At Guerreros de Acero ("Steel Warriors") on January 1, 2025, Dr. Wagner Jr. defeated DMT Azul in a steel cage ladder match to win the IWRG Intercontinental Heavyweight Championship. On April 18, he, El Hijo de Dr. Wagner Jr. and Galeno del Mal defeated Arez, Gringo Loco and Jack Cartwheel at Joey Janela's Spring Break 9. On October 30, at Castillo del Terror, Dr. Wagner Jr. lost the title back to Azul in a four-way casket match also involving Chessman and Pirata Morgan.

== In other media ==
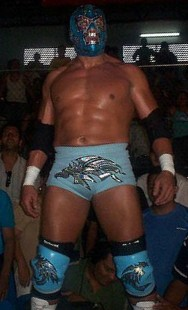
Dr. Wagner Jr. posing

In June 2010, Dr. Wagner Jr. won a four-way match to become the wrestler to be featured on the cover of the video game Lucha Libre AAA: Héroes del Ring, which was released on August 9, 2010, in North America. Wagner Jr. is one of the playable characters in the game.

== Championships and accomplishments ==
- Consejo Mundial de Lucha Libre
  - CMLL World Light Heavyweight Championship (2 times)
  - CMLL World Tag Team Championship (4 times) – with Canek (1), Silver King (1), Emilio Charles Jr. (1) and Último Guerrero (1)
  - CMLL World Trios Championship (4 times) – with Gran Markus Jr. and El Hijo del Gladiador (1), Black Warrior and Blue Panther (1), Blue Panther and Fuerza Guerrera (1), and Universo 2000 and Black Tiger III (1)
  - NWA World Light Heavyweight Championship (1 time) (Note: CMLL has not been a member of the National Wrestling Alliance since the 1980s, though the promotion still uses the NWA initials for some championships. However, the NWA no longer recognizes or sanctions any CMLL championship that still uses the NWA initials.)
  - International Gran Prix (2003)
  - Trofeo Salvador Lutteroth Gonzalez (1995)
- International Wrestling League
  - IWL World Heavyweight Championship (1 time)
- International Wrestling Revolution Group
  - IWRG Intercontinental Heavyweight Championship (1 time)
- Kaoz Lucha Libre

- Kaoz Heavyweight Championship (1 time)

- Llaves y Candados
  - LyC Tag Team Championship (1 time) - with Silver King
- Lucha Libre AAA Worldwide
  - AAA Mega Championship (3 times)
  - AAA Latin American Championship (1 time)
  - Lucha Libre Premier (2009)
- New Japan Pro-Wrestling
  - IWGP Junior Heavyweight Tag Team Championship (1 time) – with Kendo Kashin
- Pro Wrestling Revolution
  - PWR World Heavyweight Championship (1 time)
- Pro Wrestling Illustrated
  - Ranked No. 16 of the 500 best singles wrestlers in the PWI 500 in 1999 and 2010
  - Ranked No. 82 of the 500 best singles wrestlers of the "PWI Years" in 2003
- Universal Wrestling Association
  - UWA World Heavyweight Championship (1 time, final)
  - UWA World Junior Heavyweight Championship (2 times)
- World Wrestling Association
  - WWA World Junior Light Heavyweight Championship (1 time)
- Wrestling Observer Newsletter
  - Wrestling Observer Newsletter Hall of Fame (Class of 2019)

== Luchas de Apuestas record ==
Winner (wager)	Loser (wager)	Location	Event	Date	Notes
Dr. Wagner Jr. (mask)	Jungla del Norte (mask)	N/A	Live event	N/A	
Dr. Wagner Jr. (mask)	Brazo de Oro (hair)	N/A	Live event	N/A	
Dr. Wagner Jr. (mask)	Drago (Note: Not the same wrestler as Drago, who began using the same name in 2011.) (mask)	Nezahualcoyotl, State of Mexico	Live event	1988	
Dr. Wagner Jr. (mask)	Rey Misterio (hair)	Tijuana, Baja California	Live event	November 14, 2003	
Dr. Wagner Jr. (mask)	Pierroth (hair)	Acapulco, Guerrero	Live event	April 19, 2006	
Dr. Wagner Jr. (mask)	Green Demon I (mask)	Saltillo, Coahuila	Live event	August 30, 2008	(Note: They were the last two men in a 16-man elimination match.)
Dr. Wagner Jr. (mask)	Mascara Año 2000 (hair)	Puebla, Puebla	Live event	March 7, 2009	(Note: This was a steel cage match that also included Universo 2000.)
Dr. Wagner Jr. (mask)	Máscara Año 2000 Jr. (mask)	Mexico City	Triplemanía XX	August 5, 2012	
Dr. Wagner Jr. and Psycho Clown (masks)	Nuevo Poder del Norte (masks) (Carta Brava Jr. and Soul Rocker)	Ciudad Juárez, Chihuahua	Verano de Escándalo	June 4, 2017	(Note: Match also included Monster Clown and Murder Clown)
Psycho Clown (mask)	Dr. Wagner Jr. (mask)	Mexico City	Triplemanía XXV	August 26, 2017	
Rey Wagner (hair)	Jeff Jarrett (hair)	Puebla, Puebla	Héroes Inmortales XII	October 28, 2018	
Blue Demon Jr. (mask)	Rey Wagner (hair)	Mexico City	Triplemanía XXVII	August 3, 2019	
Rey Wagner (hair)	Capo Mayor (hair)	Naucalpan, State of Mexico	IWRG house show	December 6, 2020	
