= El Canek =

Mexican professional wrestler (born 1952)

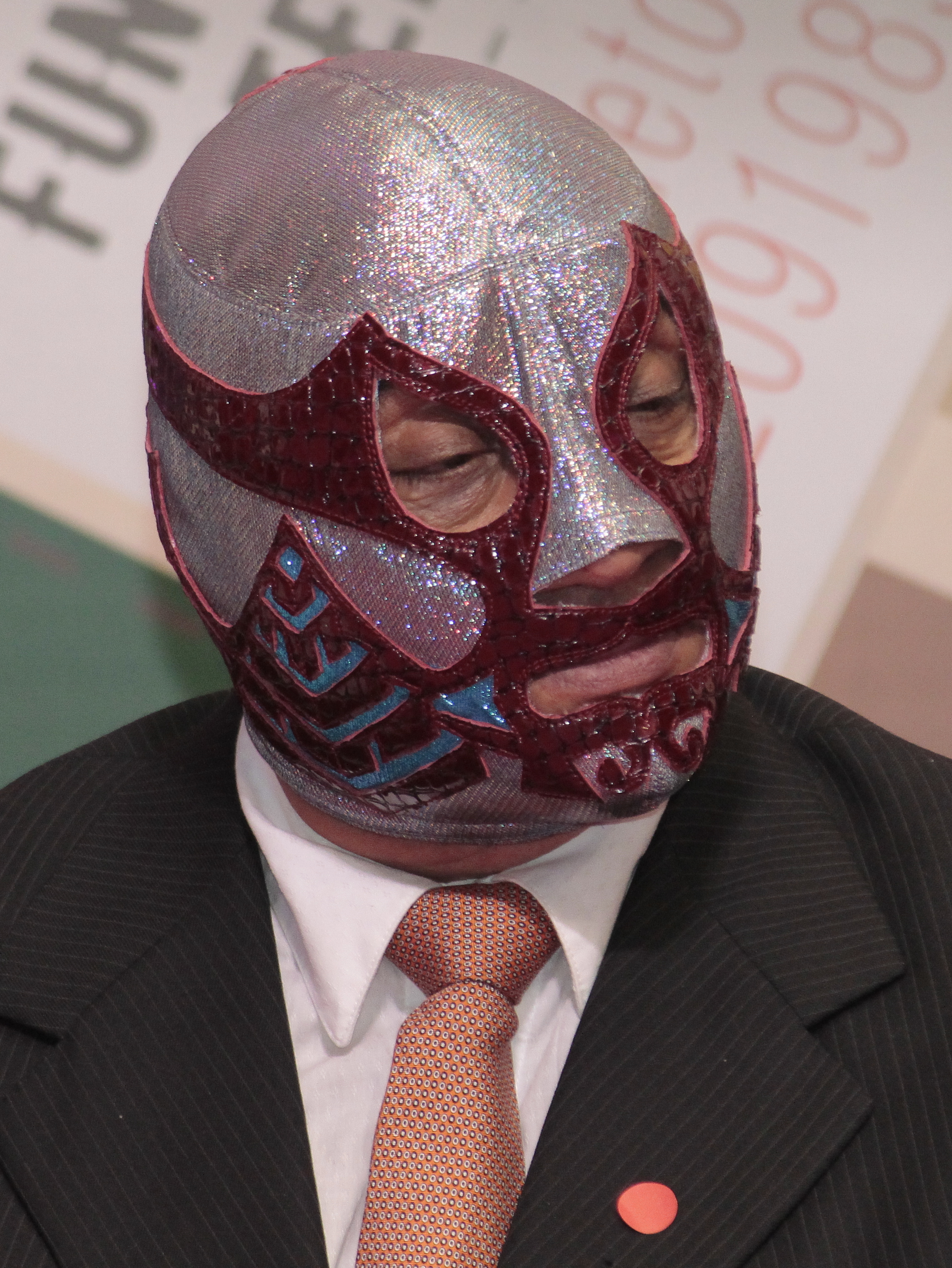
- El Canek in 2018

Personal information
- Born: Felipe Estrada; June 19, 1952 (age 74) Frontera, Tabasco, Mexico

Professional wrestling career
- Ring name(s): Canek / El Canek / Kanek; Príncipe Azul; El Universitario
- Billed height: 1.83 m (6 ft 0 in)
- Billed weight: 110 kg (243 lb)
- Trained by: El Chacal; Felipe Ham Lee; Indio Azteca; Maciste; El Remington I
- Debut: 1972

Felipe Estrada (born June 19, 1952), known as El Canek or simply Canek, is a Mexican professional wrestler, best known for the 20 years he worked for the Universal Wrestling Association where he held the UWA World Heavyweight Championship a total of 15 times. As the major heavyweight working for the Universal Wrestling Association promotion, he became one of Lucha Libre's biggest attractions during the 1980s especially through his high-profile matches against non-Mexicans that sold out numerous shows and led to the UWA using the same formula of "Canek vs. the foreigner" for over a decade. He made his debut in 1972 as "El Universitario" at the age of 18 and would later work under the name "Principe Azul" (Spanish for "The Blue Prince"). In 1973 he adopted the ring name El Canek, a name inspired by the Mayan Indian leader Jacinto Canek, that he has used ever since. While he has worked in Mexico for the majority of his career he has also made several, frequent, tours of Japan and has worked in the United States as well as Europe.

In Mexican professional wrestling, as part of the wrestling style called lucha libre, it is tradition to keep the real name of any masked wrestler secret from the general audience; the newspapers and magazines in Mexico do not speculate on them, nor do they publish clear photos of their faces. In the case of El Canek his real name is known since he competed in a mixed martial arts fight where he was billed as "Felipe "El Canek" Estrada, and actually fought with his mask on. Estrada has one son who is also a wrestler under the name El Hijo del Canek ("The Son of El Canek") and a second, much younger, son who was introduced as "Canek Jr." but who has not yet worked any matches. Outside of the UWA Estrada has also worked for Consejo Mundial de Lucha Libre (CMLL), AAA, International Wrestling Revolution Group (IWRG) and a host of other Mexican independent promotions and appeared on the 1997 Royal Rumble pay-per-view for the World Wrestling Federation (WWF, now WWE). He is a former holder of the Mexican National Light Heavyweight Championship, CMLL World Tag Team Championship, CMLL World Trios Championship, IWRG Intercontinental Heavyweight Championship and the 2002 Rey de Reyes.

== Personal life ==
Felipe Estrada was born in Frontera, Tabasco, Mexico on June 19, 1952. He is the older brother of wrestlers Príncipe Maya and El Danés and the uncle of wrestler Rey Maya, the son of Príncipe Maya. Estrada himself has at least two sons, one wrestles as El Hijo del Canek ("The Son of El Canek") and another that has been introduced as Canek Jr., but who has not wrestled. Hijo del Canek is sometimes billed as Canek Jr., confusing him with his much younger brother.

== Professional wrestling career ==
=== Early career (1972–1973) ===
Estrada began training for his professional wrestling career in the nearby town of Villahermosa, Tabasco training under Indio Azteca, Maciste, El Remington I and El Chacal for his professional wrestling career. While training for a professional wrestling career he also learned the basics of Olympic style wrestling and also competed in bodybuilding competitions. His in-ring debut came about earlier than expected as a local wrestling promoter asked Estrada to fill in for a wrestler who could not make that night's show. He made his debut that night working as the enmascarado (Masked wrestler) El Universitario ("The Academic" or College Student), a name that reflected that he was still in wrestling school. As Universitario he teamed up with Ángel Azul and fought against the team of El Profeta and El Chilango Garcia. Later when he was ready to make his full-time debut Estrada bought a spare mask, boots and tights from Ángel Azul and began working as 'Príncipe Azul ("The Blue Prince"). As Príncipe Azul he found a lot of initial success, combining his mat skills with his very muscular physique, something less common in those days and ended up unmasking Ultratumba after defeating him in a Luchas de Apuestas, or bet match and later on would also force Ultratumba to be shaved bald. Later on he also won the hair of El Noruego as well. His early success as Príncipe Azul led to him being named the Villahermosa rookie of the year in 1972. In early 1973 Estrada decided he needed a new image, a unique image not based on the mask of his former partner. Inspired by the Mayan Indian warrior leader Jacinto Canek came up with the name of "El Canek", complete with a redesigned mask and tights that incorporated mayana patterns and symbols. He worked his first match as "El Canek" (billed as "Kanek" for that one match only) in the Torero de Cuatro Caminos in Naucalpan, Mexican State, an arena he would sell out repeatedly later in his career.

=== Empresa Mexicana de Lucha Libre (1973–1975) ===
Shortly after his debut El Canek moved to Mexico City, working for Empresa Mexicana de Lucha Libre (EMLL) while also training at "Gym Ham Lee" under head trainer Felipe Ham Lee as well as Sugi Sito and Fantasma de la Quebrada. (Note: This was the original Fantasma de la Quebrada, not a later wrestler also known as Fantasma de la Quebrada who made his wrestling debut in 1986.) During his time with EMLL he would often tour the Northern territories for promoter René Guajardo. At that point he won the Northern Mexico Heavyweight Championship defeating Jose Torres, a man he would later also defeat in a Luchas de Apuestas match. Working mainly in the north El Canek won several headline matches, including unmasking El Destroyer and Lemus as well as winning the hair of Dory Dixon, Sunny War Cloud and Ruben Juarez but never worked regularly in EMLL's main territory in and around Mexico City.

=== Universal Wrestling Association (1975–1995) ===
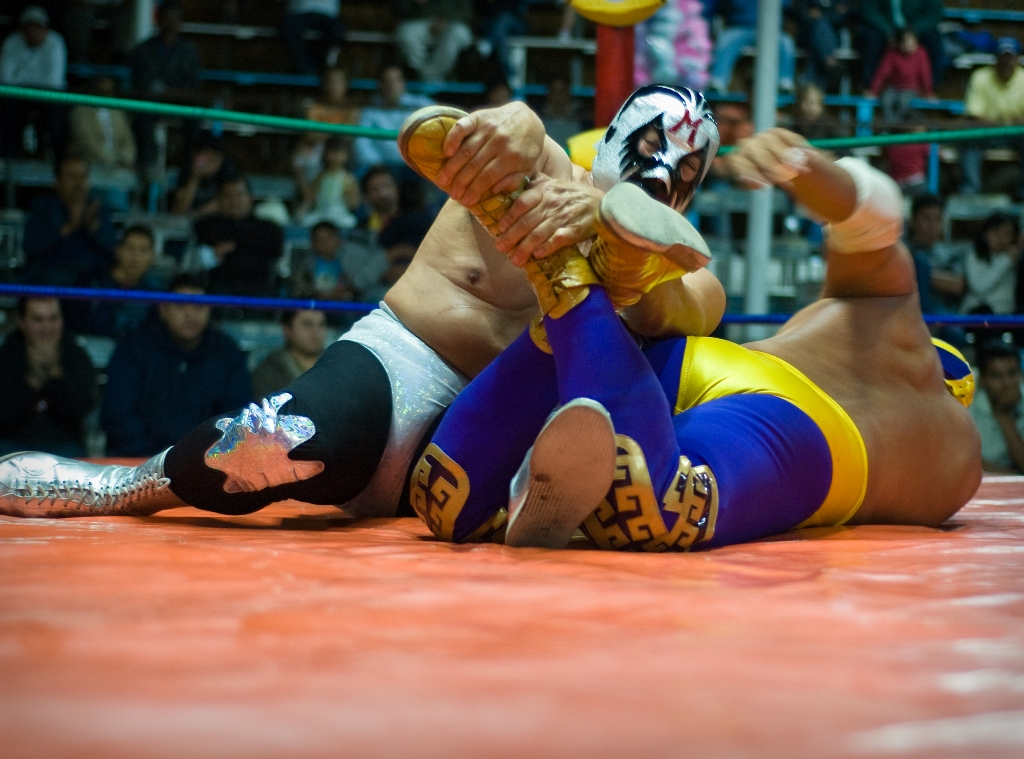
Canek (in blue and yellow) wrestles one of his more frequent rivals, Mil Máscaras (in silver and black), in 2009.

In 1974 EMLL founder and owner Salvador Lutteroth brought his son into the promotion, grooming him to take over when the aging Lutteroth, Sr. eventually had to retire. This action combined with a very rigid and conservative promotional philosophy led EMLL's Promoter in Naucalpan, Mexico State, Francisco Flores, EMLL wrestler and trainer Ray Mendoza and investor Benjamin Mora, Jr. to break away from EMLL to form their own company called the Universal Wrestling Association. With the impending change of management in EMLL many wrestlers who had previously been loyal to Lutteroth decided to leave with Flores, Mendoza and Mora including promoters René and Karloff Lagarde as well as number of young wrestles, including El Canek who were frustrated with the lack of opportunities in EMLL. They held their first show on January 29, 1975, with El Canek teaming up with former rivals Dory Dixon and Sunny War Cloud to lose the semi-main event to the team of Mil Máscaras, Ray Mendoza and El Solitario. One of the early draws in the UWA was Mil Máscaras, but he began taking more and more bookings in both the United States and Japan, leaving little time for the UWA between tours, coupled with the age of two of the most recognizable wrestlers in the UWA, Mendoza and Guajardo, the UWA bookers were looking to create new headliners, with the two front runners being the tecnico (wrestling term for those that portray the "good guys") Dos Caras (brother of Mil Máscaras) and El Canek who played the part of a brutal, cheating rudo (those that portray the "bad guys") El Canek. The UWA decided to have El Canek defeat Dr. Wagner to win the Mexican National Light Heavyweight Championship on January 15, 1978. The title run was used to build a storyline feud between El Canek and Dos Caras as Caras was immediately positioned as the next challenger and actually won the championship from El Canek on June 20, 1978 During the feud the fans responded favorably to the two wrestlers as each played their part to perfection, the physically imposing El Canek used his strength to dominate and gloat his way to becoming a rudo that the fans would gladly pay admission to see get beat up while Dos Caras became the quintessential tecnico, the hero of the people who overcame the odds and defeated the bad guys, while also being a very talented wrestler.

On September 27, 1978, El Canek defeated the legendary Lou Thesz to win the UWA World Heavyweight Championship, a move that signaled that he was now the "top name" in the UWA, gaining international attention by defeating the multi-time NWA World Heavyweight Champion Thesz. Around the time that El Canek became the world champion the UWA also struck deals with various international wrestling promotions to exchange wrestlers to allow for an influx of foreign wrestlers. The main partner for the UWA was New Japan Pro-Wrestling (NJPW) that started sending some of their top wrestlers to Mexico in exchange for El Canek, Dos Caras and others making frequent tours of Japan in exchange. One such NJPW wrestler was Tiger Jeet Singh, who came to Mexico and had a short feud with El Canek before winning the UWA Heavyweight Championship on February 17, 1980. El Canek's unsuccessful challenges for Tiger Jeet Singh's championship drew sellout crowds for months. Almost a year later El Canek finally brought the championship "back" to Mexico defeating Tiger Jeet Sing on February 15. The success of El Canek fighting various foreign wrestlers drew such good crowds that it became the template for how the UWA would book El Canek and the world title for more than a decade. In between matches in Mexico against the "hated foreigners" El Canek would also travel to Japan and fight against some of NJPW's top wrestlers such as Tiger Mask and Tatsumi Fujinami. On July 23, 1982, NJPW wrestler Riki Choshu defeated El Canek to win the championship, once again putting El Canek in the position of both defending Mexico's honor as well as chasing the championship. During his time between championship reigns El Canek teamed up with Perro Aguayo to face the mismatched team of the 1.68 m (5 ft 6 in) tall Japanese Gran Hamada with the 2.01 m (6 ft 7 in) tall American Hulk Hogan, in one of Hogan's tours of Mexico before he became a house hold name. On September 26 El Canek regained the title, which led to the next challenger in early 1983, Fujinami, UWA repeats the pattern by having Fujinami win the championship in May, 1983 and has El Canek win it back in June of that year. On January 29, 1984, El Canek defended the championship against André the Giant, who was billed as being 2.26 m (7 ft 5 in) tall and weighing 240 kg (530 lb). The match was the main event of the UWA 9th Anniversary Show, during which El Canek was able to pick up André and slam him winning the match. This made El Canek one of only a few wrestlers to ever be allowed to bodyslam André the Giant. He would later vacate the championship as he began to work regularly in the United States, especially in and around Texas. Not liking working in the US he returned to the UWA only a few months later.

Over the summer of 1982 the UWA made Dos Caras the next UWA World Heavyweight Champion, using the opportunity to revive the feud between Dos Caras and El Canek. In between fighting Dos Caras El Canek had many opportunities to defend Mexico, including a match on September 2, 1984, where the then WWF World Heavyweight Champion Hulk Hogan actually defended the championship against El Canek in Mexico. The match ended in a draw with both wrestlers winning one fall before the time limit expired. Canek would also have a successful title defense against Stan Hansen only a few weeks later. Dos Caras would win the UWA World Heavyweight Championship twice more from El Canek during their feud, but the storyline never results in a Luchas de Apuestas match between El Canek and Dos Caras. While the UWA kept using the appeal of El Canek fighting against foreigners it was not until November 22, 1989, that they had another foreigner win the championship as Big Van Vader pinned El Canek. As time went on the UWA struggled to draw the crowds they were used to during their heyday of the 1980s the UWA had a harder time drawing a paying audience for El Canek fighting foreigners such as Buffalo Allen, P. N. News, Konnan, King Haku, or Kokina. On January 31, 1993, El Canek lost the championship to Canadian Vampire Casanova, a decision that was later held up as one of the critical points in the later demise of the UWA as the fans did not like Vampiro and the attendance dropped significantly while he was champion and never recovered even after El Canek regained the championship. In 1995 the UWA closed, with El Canek being the reigning and 13-time champion at that point in time. Even though the UWA had closed El Canek kept wearing the heavyweight championship belt and actually defended it on various shows around Mexico despite the UWA no longer being around.

=== Consejo Mundial de Lucha Libre (1991–1994, 2004–2006) ===
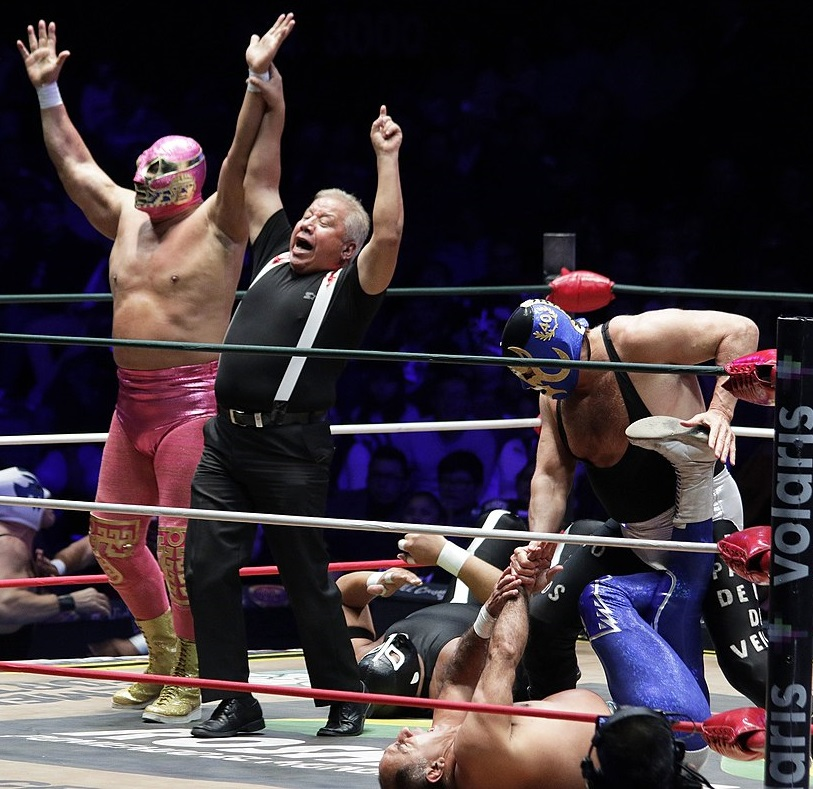
El Canek (left) celebrating a victory in November 2018.

By 1991 the UWA began working together with Consejo Mundial de Lucha Libre (CMLL, formerly EMLL), putting aside the issues that led to the split in the 1970s. As a result, El Canek began working regularly for CMLL as well beginning in 1991. In 1993 CMLL held a tournament to crown the first ever CMLL World Tag Team Champions and held a CMLL/UWA tournament the stretched out over several weeks. El Canek was teamed up with Dr. Wagner Jr. for the tournament and the team defeated Los Brazos (Brazo de Oro and Brazo de Plata) in the first round, Atlantis and El Dandy in the second round and finally Apolo Dantés and Rayo de Jalisco Jr. to earn a spot in the finale against Vampiro Canadiense and Pierroth Jr. The finale took place over three shows, with a best-two-out-of-three match stipulation. Canek and Wagner Jr. won the first match on March 19, while Vampiro and Pierroth Jr. won the second match on March 21. The final match took place on March 26, 1993, and saw El Canek and Dr. Wagner Jr. win the fall and thus become the first ever CMLL World Tag Team Champions. The duo had successful title defenses against the teams of El Dandy and Pierroth Jr. as well as El Texano and Silver King. In November, 1994 El Canek stops working for CMLL, forcing CMLL to vacate the championship that he still held with Dr. Wagner Jr. at that point in time.

El Canek returned to CMLL almost a decade later, on March 26, 2005, teaming with Shocker and Máscara Mágica to defeat the trio of El Terrible, Rey Bucanero and Último Guerrero in the main event of CMLL's weekly Super Viernes. A few days later Canek's son El Hijo del Canek made his CMLL debut as well, running in during a match where Universo 2000 was about to tear the mask off his father. Upon his return to CMLL El Canek began a storyline feud with former partner Dr. Wagner Jr., with the story being that Dr. Wagner Jr. still resented Canek for leaving years earlier. As part of the storyline Dr. Wagner Jr. defeated El Canek to win the UWA World Heavyweight Championship on June 18, 2004. A few weeks later Canek got a measure of revenge as he, Black Warrior and Rayo de Jalisco, Jr. defeated Dr. Wagner Jr. Black Tiger III and Universo 2000 to win the CMLL World Trios Championship. The storyline between Canek and Dr. Wagner Jr. led to them being included in a four-way Luchas de Apuestas match, the main event of the CMLL 71st Anniversary Show, that also included Universo 2000 and Rayo de Jalisco. Dr. Wagner Jr. escaped from the match with his mask safe by pinning Canek, while Rayo de Jalisco pinned Universo. In the end Universo 2000 was disqualified and thus had to unmask as a result. Weeks later Universo 2000 won the 2004 Leyenda de Azul ("The Blue Legend") tournament when he eliminated El Canek as the last man out of a field of 16 wrestlers.| The trio of Canek, Black Warrior and Rayo de Jalisco Jr. held the trios championship for 133 days before a team known as La Furia del Norte (Héctor Garza, Tarzan Boy and El Terrible) defeated them for the championship on November 19, 2004. The feud with Dr. Wagner Jr. continued to develop, including Dr. Wagner Jr. successfully defending the UWA World Heavyweight Championship against El Canek on December 21, 2004. Over the next year the storyline with Dr. Wagner Jr. was partially abandoned as Dr. Wagner Jr. turned tecnico as part of a different storyline. El Canek remained with CMLL until early 2006.

=== AAA (1996–2003, 2013) ===
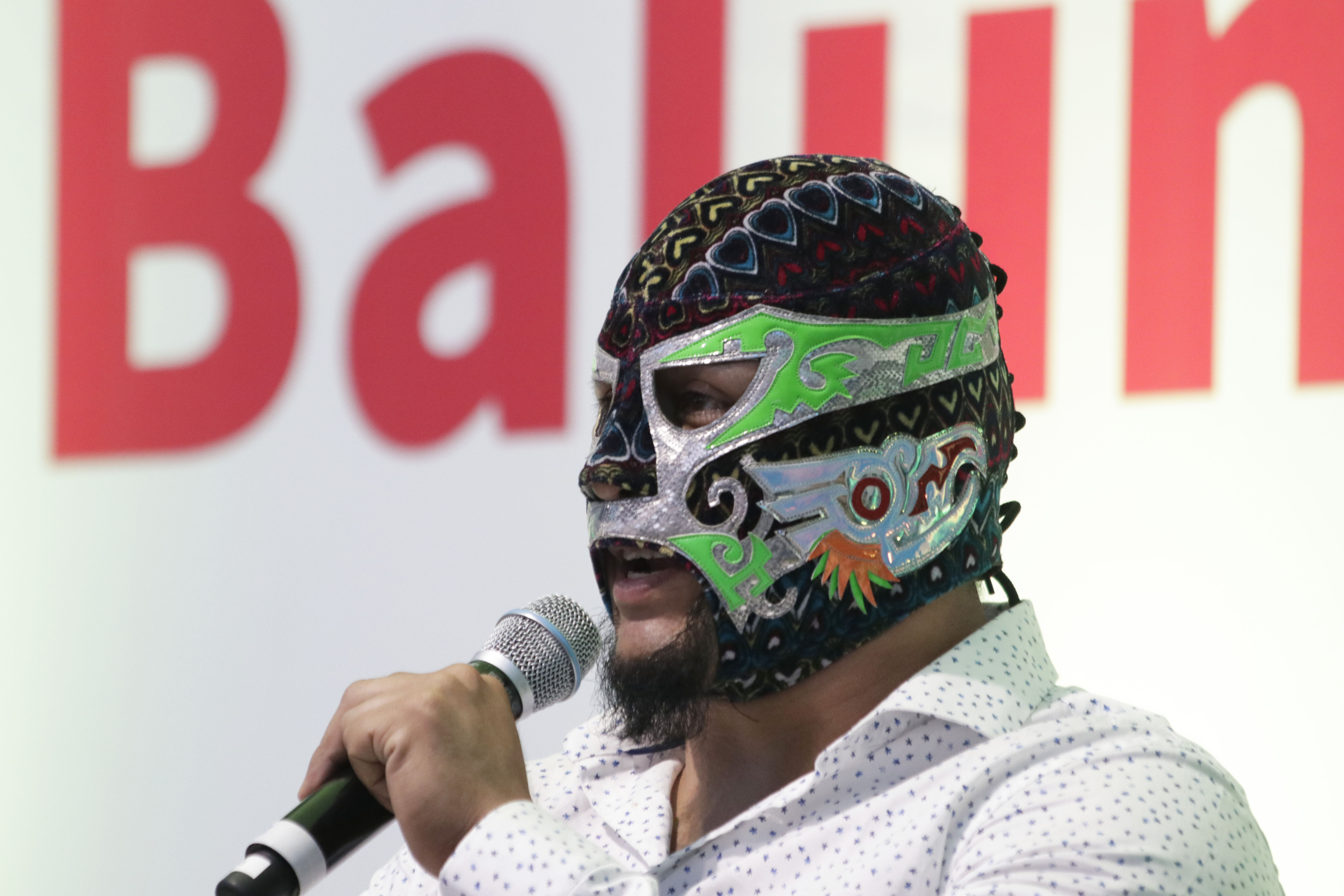
One of El Canek's sons, El Canek Jr., during a press conference

After leaving CMLL later in 1996 he showed up in CMLL's rival AAA only weeks after his last CMLL match. El Canek worked one major match for the World Wrestling Federation (now WWE) because of AAA and WWF having a working agreement from 1996 to 1998, wrestling on the 1997 Royal Rumble out of San Antonio, Texas. He teamed up with Héctor Garza, Perro Aguayo, defeating the team of Heavy Metal, Jerry Estrada and Fuerza Guerrera when Aguayo pinned Heavy Metal. El Canek, Perro Aguayo and Tinieblas Jr. defeated Gorgeous George III, Jake Roberts and the Killer in the main event of AAA's Triplemanía V-A show. Two days later he also worked the main event of Triplemanía V-B as he, Perro Aguayo, Octagón and Cibernético defeated Jake Roberts, Gorgeous George III, El Cobarde II and Fuerza Guerrera.

Subsequently, Cibernético turned on El Canek, trying to take the UWA World Heavyweight Championship from him. On August 15, 1997, El Canek was able to retain the UWA World Heavyweight Championship, defeating Cibernético. The two rivals next faced off in a steel cage match at AAA's 1997 Verano de Escándalo ("Summer of Scandal") show, which ended in a draw as both men were unable continue. in 1999 Cibernético defeated El Canek in a Bull Terrier match on March 31, followed by Canek defeating Cibernético in a steel cage match only 5 days later. On January 20, 2002, Cibernético won the UWA World Heavyweight Champions from El Canek. At the 2002 Rey del Ring ("Kings of the Ring") tournament El Canek defeated El Picudo, Septiembre Negro and El Hijo del Solitario in the semi-finals and then outlasted Pirata Morgan, Cibernético and Octagón to win the 2002 Rey de Reyes tournament. The win turned out to be one of El Canek's last AAA matches, basically regaining the UWA World Heavyweight Championship on the way out of the promotion.

Canek returned to AAA for a short stint in 2013, trying to repeat as Rey de Reyes, defeating Cibernético, Electroshock, Perro Aguayo Jr., Silver Cain and Toscano to earn a spot in the finals. In the finals he was pinned by El Mesisas. At the subsequent Triplemanía XXI show on June 16, 2013, Canek, former rival Universo 2000, Máscara Año 2000 and Villano IV lost to Dr. Wagner, Jr., Electroshock, La Parka and Octagón in a match that drew on the fact that the issues between Canek and Dr. Wagner Jr. were never resolved.

=== International Wrestling Revolution Group (2003–2006, 2009–2012) ===
After ending his first stint with AAA El Canek turned up in International Wrestling Revolution Group (IWRG) next, who promoted shows in Naucalpan, where El Canek used to main event during his UWA days. Early on he worked a program with Rayo de Jalisco Jr. over the WWA World Heavyweight Championship held by Rayo de Jalisco Jr. While in IWRG he also defended the UWA World Heavyweight Championship, a title he still claimed despite the UWA being inactive for eight years at that point in time. On May 5, 2005, El Canek and Rayo de Jalisco Jr. faced off against Perro Aguayo Jr. and Head Hunter I in a match where the winning team would then wrestle for the vacant IWRG Intercontinental Heavyweight Championship. Canel and Jalisco Jr won the match, then El Canek defeated Rayo de Jalisco Jr. to become the 13th over all IWRG Intercontinental Heavyweight Champion. Canek would defend the championship twice in 2006, against Rayo de Jalisco Jr. and eternal rival Dr. Wagner Jr. Late in the year Canek's knees had deteriorated to a rate where he had to take time off to have reconstructive surgery and then rehab and as a result only wrestled sporadically from 2007 to 2009, not just for IWRG but in general. While he was inactive IWRG did not vacate the Heavyweight title, but also did not promote it while El Canek was not working for them. El Canek returned to IWRG in 2009, bringing the championship belt back with him. Canek and El Hijo del Canek won a father/son tag team tournament that took place on December 20, 2009, defeating El Hijo del Pantera and Pantera, Exodia Olímpico, Máscara Año 2000 and Máscara Año 2000 Jr., Negro Navarro and Trauma I, El Hijo de Pirata Morgan and Pirata Morgan.

On April 18, 2010, El Canek, Máscara Año 2000 Jr., Scorpio Jr. and Pirata Morgan were forced to fight each other in a match where the first two men pinned would have to face off for either their mask, hair or in Canek's case the IWRG Intercontinental Heavyweight Championship. Scorpio and Morgan both pinned their opponents, forcing Canek and Máscara Año 2000 Jr. to fight. In the end the young Máscara Año 2000 Jr. defeated El Canek ending the 1444 long reign of El Canek. On December 20, 2012, El Canek and El Hijo del Canek competed in a five-team tag team steel cage match that was the main event of the Arena Naucalpan 36th Anniversary Show. The Caneks, Dr. Wagner Jr. and Hijo del Dr. Wagner Jr, Los Capos Junior (Hijo de Máscara Año 2000 and Máscara Año 2000 Jr.) and La Familia de Tijuana defeated Los Piratas (Pirata Morgan and El Hijo de Pirata Morgan).

=== International Wrestling League (2011–present) ===
El Canek became the first International Wrestling League (IWL) Independent Heavyweight Championship when he defeated Dr. Wagner Jr. and L.A. Park to win the title. On January 13, 2015, he lost the title to Mr. Jack as part of an ongoing storyline between the two.

As of 2026, El Canek still wrestles; he is 72 years old.

== Mixed martial arts career ==
Estrada is one of many wrestlers who has also competed in mixed martial arts (MMA). He fought in one MMA match for the Japanese DEEP 2001 promotion. For the match he was billed as "Felipe "El Canek" Estrada", publicly revealing his real name for the first time. He fought the match with his "El Canek" mask on and defeated Osamu Kawahara in his sole MMA match.

=== Mixed martial arts record ===
Professional record breakdown
1 match	1 win	0 losses
By knockout	1	0
By submission	0	0
By decision	0	0
No contests	0	

Res.	Record	Opponent	Method	Event	Date	Round	Time	Location	Notes
Win	1-0	Osamu Kawahara	TKO (punches)	Deep - 3rd Impact	December 23, 2001	1	4:55	Tokyo, Japan	MMA debut

== Championships and accomplishments ==
- Alianza Universal De Lucha Libre
  - Copa Universo (2014)
- AAA
  - Rey de Reyes (2002)
- Empresa Mexicana de Lucha Libre/Consejo Mundial de Lucha Libre
  - CMLL World Tag Team Championship (1 time) - with Dr. Wagner, Jr.
  - CMLL World Trios Championship (1 time) - with Black Warrior and Rayo de Jalisco, Jr.
  - Northern Mexico Heavyweight Championship (1 time)
- Independent Wrestling League/International Wrestling League
  - IWL Independent Heavyweight Championship (2 times)
- International Wrestling Revolution Group
  - IWRG Intercontinental Heavyweight Championship (1 time)
- Leyendas Inmortales de la Lucha Libre
  - Copa Independencia (2014)
  - Copa Francisco Flores (2014)
- Pro Wrestling Illustrated
  - PWI ranked him # 79 of the 500 best singles wrestlers during the PWI Years in 2003
  - PWI ranked him # 186 of the 500 best singles wrestlers of the PWI 500 in 1995
- Universal Wrestling Association
  - Mexican National Light Heavyweight Championship (1 time)
  - UWA World Heavyweight Championship (15 times)
- Wrestling Observer Newsletter
  - Wrestling Observer Newsletter Hall of Fame (Class of 1996)

== Luchas de Apuestas record ==
Winner (wager)	Loser (wager)	Location	Event	Date	Notes
Príncipe Azul (mask)	Ultratumba (mask)	Villahermosa, Tabasco	Live event	1972	
Príncipe Azul (mask)	Ultratumba (hair)	Villahermosa, Tabasco	Live event	1972	
Príncipe Azul (mask)	El Noruego (hair)	Villahermosa, Tabasco	Live event	1972	
El Canek (mask)	El Destroyer (mask)	Monterrey, Nuevo León	Live event	1973-1974	
El Canek (mask)	Dory Dixon (hair)	Unknown	Live event	1973-1974	
El Canek (mask)	Humberto Garza (hair)	Unknown	Live event	Unknown	
El Canek (mask)	César Valentino (hair)	Unknown	Live event	Unknown	
El Canek (mask)	La Momia (mask)	San Luis Potosí, San Luis Potosí	Unknown	Unknown	
El Canek (mask)	La Momia (hair)	Unknown	Live event	Unknown	
El Canek (mask)	Pantera Negra (hair)	Unknown	Live event	Unknown	
El Canek (mask)	Coloso Colosetti (hair)	Unknown	Live event	Unknown	
El Canek (mask)	Coloso Colosetti (hair)	Unknown	Live event	Unknown	
El Canek (mask)	Lemús (mask)	Monterrey, Nuevo León	Live event	1974	
El Canek (mask)	Sunny War Cloud (hair)	Monterrey, Nuevo León	Live event	1975	
El Canek (mask)	Rubén Juárez (hair)	Monterrey, Nuevo León	Live event	1975	
El Canek (mask)	José Torres (hair)	Monterrey, Nuevo León	Live event	1975	
El Canek (mask)	Ángel Blanco (hair)	Naucalpan, State of Mexico	UWA Live event	May 4, 1980	
El Canek (mask)	El Asesino (mask)	Mexico City, Mexico	Live event	July 5, 1981	
El Canek (mask)	Don Corleone (mask)	Naucalpan, State of Mexico	Live event	1982	
El Canek (mask)	Abdullah Tamba (hair)	Unknown	Live event	1983	
El Canek (mask)	Ring Fujinami (hair)	Naucalpan, State of Mexico	Live event	1983	
El Canek (mask)	Blue Blazer (mask)	Naucalpan, State of Mexico	UWA Live event	May 29, 1991	
El Canek (mask)	Torre Infernal (mask)	Naucalpan, State of Mexico	Live event	November 15, 1992	
El Canek (mask)	Yamato (hair)	Naucalpan, State of Mexico	Live event	August 15, 1993	
El Canek (mask)	Scorpio, Jr. (hair)	Naucalpan, State of Mexico	Live event	October 3, 1996	(Note: Lost a Relevos Suicidas match to Ultimo Vampiro and El Mexicano and thus had to wrestle for their mask and hair.)
El Canek (mask)	Universo 2000 (mask)	Mexico City, Mexico	CMLL 71st Anniversary Show	September 17, 2004	(Note: This was a 4-way match that also included Dr. Wagner Jr. and Rayo de Jalisco Jr.)
Máscara Año 2000 Jr. (mask)	El Canek (Championship)	Naucalpan, State of Mexico	IWRG Live event	April 18, 2010	(Note: The two lost a Relevos Suicida match to Scorpio Jr. and Pirata Morgan and were forced to wrestle each other.)
