= Rey Mysterio =

American professional wrestler (born 1974)

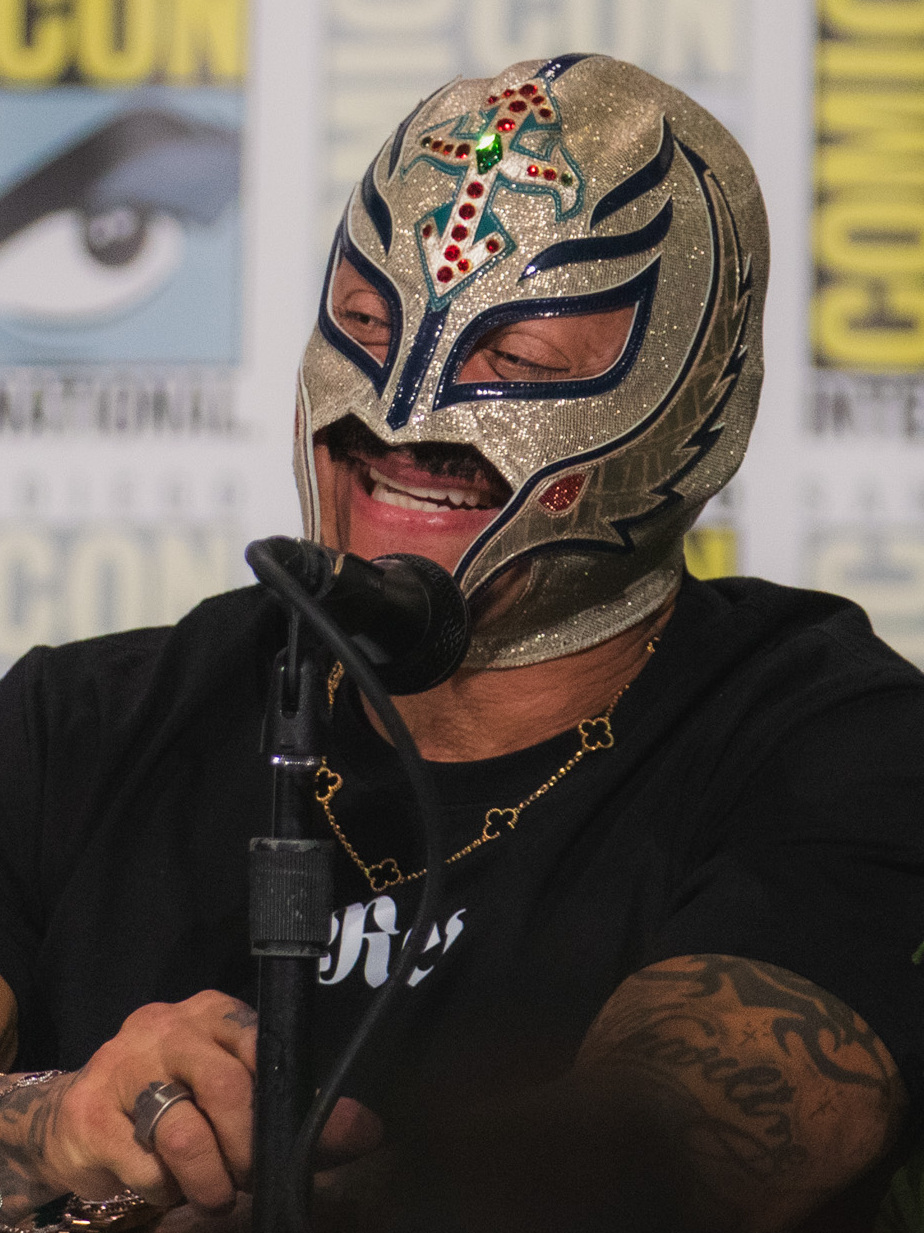
- Mysterio in 2026

Personal information
- Born: Óscar Gutiérrez Rubio; December 11, 1974 (age 51) Chula Vista, California, U.S.
- Spouse: Angie Gutiérrez (m. 1996)
- Children: 2, including Dominik
- Relatives: Rey Misterio (Sr.) (uncle); El Hijo de Rey Misterio (cousin)

Professional wrestling career
- Ring names: Colibri; La Lagartija Verde; El Niño; Rey Misterio II; Rey Misterio Jr.; Rey Mysterio; Rey Mysterio Jr.
- Billed height: 5 ft 6 in (168 cm)
- Billed weight: 175 lb (79 kg)
- Billed from: San Diego, California
- Trained by: Rey Misterio
- Debut: April 30, 1989
- Rey Mysterio's voice Rey Mysterio discusses working with Eddie Guerrero in the early part of his career. Recorded January 14, 2018.

Óscar Gutiérrez Rubio (born December 11, 1974), better known by his ring name Rey Mysterio, (Note: Derived from Spanish for "Mystery King".) is an American professional wrestler. He is signed to WWE, where he performs on the Raw brand. He also performs in WWE's sister promotion Lucha Libre AAA Worldwide (AAA). Widely regarded as both one of the greatest luchadors and cruiserweight wrestlers of all time, Mysterio is an inductee of the AAA Hall of Fame, Wrestling Observer Newsletter Hall of Fame, and WWE Hall of Fame.

The nephew and trainee of Rey Misterio, Mysterio began wrestling on the independent circuit in 1989 at the age of 14 before joining Asistencia Asesoría y Administración in 1992. After brief stints with Extreme Championship Wrestling and Wrestle Association R, Mysterio signed with World Championship Wrestling (WCW) in 1996. In WCW, Mysterio helped popularize lucha libre in the United States, which led to the rise of cruiserweight wrestling divisions, winning the WCW Cruiserweight Championship five times; the WCW World Tag Team Championship three times; and the WCW Cruiserweight Tag Team Championship once. He lost his mask in a Lucha de Apuestas against Kevin Nash, working unmasked until 2002.

Following the closure of WCW in 2001, Mysterio wrestled for promotions including Consejo Mundial de Lucha Libre, the World Wrestling Council, and the X Wrestling Federation before joining World Wrestling Entertainment (WWE) in 2002, where he resumed wearing a mask. He stayed with WWE until 2015, winning the World Heavyweight Championship twice, the WWE Championship once, the WWE Cruiserweight Championship three times, the WWE Intercontinental Championship twice, the WWE United States Championship three times, and the WWE Tag Team Championship four times, as well as winning the 2006 Royal Rumble.

Mysterio departed WWE in 2015, appearing in promotions including New Japan Pro-Wrestling, Lucha Underground, and Asistencia Asesoría y Administración. He returned to WWE in 2018, joined by his son Dominik.

== Early life ==
Óscar Gutiérrez was born on December 11, 1974, in Chula Vista, California, a suburb of San Diego. His parents are Mexican nationals Maria del Rosario and Roberto Gutierrez (1948–2024), both from very poor, uneducated backgrounds; Maria was a house cleaner and Roberto was a factory worker. Gutiérrez spent his childhood crossing the border from Tijuana to San Diego each day for school. He dropped out of high school with his parents' approval. He has three brothers.

== Professional wrestling career ==
=== Early career (1989–1992) ===
Gutiérrez made his debut in Mexico on April 30, 1989, when he was 14 years old. He was trained by his uncle Rey Misterio and wrestled early on in Mexico, where he learned the Lucha Libre high flying style that has been his trademark. He had ring names such as "La Lagartija Verde" ("the Green Lizard") and "Colibrí" ("Hummingbird") before his uncle gave him the name of "Rey Misterio Jr." In 1991, while wrestling in Mexico as Colibrí, Mysterio was named "Most Improved Wrestler".

=== Asistencia Asesoría y Administración (1992–1996) ===
Misterio Jr. began wrestling regularly for Asistencia Asesoría y Administración (AAA), one of Mexico's largest promotions, in mid-1992. In August 1992, he defeated Mr. Cóndor in a mask versus mask match in Acapulco. In October 1992, he defeated Rocco Valente in a mask versus hair match in Tampico. In November 1992, he defeated Tony Arce in a mask versus hair match in Acapulco. In October 1992, Misterio Jr. defeated Fantasma de la Quebrada in Aguascalientes to win the Mexican National Welterweight Championship. His reign lasted until February 1993, when he lost to Heavy Metal in Mexico City.

In April 1993 at the inaugural Triplemanía in Mexico City's Plaza de Toros México, Misterio Jr. teamed with Misterioso and Volador to defeat Los Destructores. In May 1993, Misterio Jr. defeated Bandido in a mask versus mask match in Querétaro City. In September 1993, he defeated Vulcano in a mask versus hair match in Monterrey.

In January 1994, Misterio Jr. teamed with Winners to win a "young stars" tag team tournament, defeating Marabunta and Reptil in the finals. In April 1994 at Triplemanía II-A in Aguscalientes, Misterio Jr. teamed with his uncle, Rey Misterio, and Winners to defeat Los Destructores. In May 1994 at Triplemanía II-B in Zapopan, Misterio Jr., his uncle, and Volador lost to Fuerza Guerrera, his son Juventud Guerrera, and Misterioso. Later that month at Triplemanía II-C in the Plaza Monumental de Tijuana, Misterio Jr. teamed with his uncle and El Torero to defeat Fishman, Fuerza Guerrera, and Pirata Morgan. In November 1994, Misterio Jr. participated in When Worlds Collide, a pay-per-view co-promoted by AAA and the American promotion World Championship Wrestling (WCW) in the Los Angeles Memorial Sports Arena in the United States, teaming with Heavy Metal and Latin Lover in a loss to Fuerza Guerrera, Madonna's Boyfriend, and Psicosis; he later credited the event as the reason WCW noticed him.

In early 1995, Misterio Jr. and his uncle were recognized as WWA Tag Team Champions; their reign ended in March 1995 when they lost to the father-son duo of Fuerza Guerrera and Juventud Guerrera in Xalapa. In April 1995, Misterio Jr. teamed with Octagón and Super Muñeco to win the Mexican National Trios Championship in Mexico City. Their reign lasted until July 1995, when they lost to Blue Panther, Fuerza Guerrera, and Psicosis in Monterrey. In June 1995 at Triplemanía III-B in Tonalá, Jalisco, Misterio Jr. teamed with El Hijo del Santo, Octagón, and La Parka to defeat Blue Panther, Fuerza Guerrera, Pentagón, and Psicosis. Later that month at Triplemanía III-C in Ciudad Madero, Misterio Jr., El Hijo del Santo, and Octagón defeated Blue Panther, Fuerza Guerrera, and Psicosis.

In May 1996, Misterio Jr. was unable to wrestle at Triplemanía IV-A due to it coinciding with his wedding; his best man, Psicosis, also missed the show. In June 1996 at the World Wrestling Peace Festival in the Los Angeles Memorial Sports Arena in the United States, Misterio Jr. teamed with Último Dragón to defeat Heavy Metal and Psicosis. Later that month at Triplemanía IV-B in Orizaba, Misterio Jr. teamed with Oro Jr., Super Caló, and Winners to defeat Halloween, Kraken, Mosco de la Merced, and Perro Silva. In July 1996 at Triplemanía IV-C in Ciudad Madero, Misterio Jr. faced Juventud Guerrera in a "winner gets the loser's car" match, with Misterio Jr. defeating Guerrera following assistance from Konnan.

Misterio Jr. ceased appearing regularly in AAA in October 1996, several months after signing with World Championship Wrestling.

=== Extreme Championship Wrestling (1995–1996) ===
Misterio Jr. debuted in Paul Heyman's Extreme Championship Wrestling (ECW) promotion in 1995. He debuted on September 16, 1995, at Gangstas Paradise, defeating Psicosis, who was also making his ECW debut. A feud between the two began, which included a two out of three falls match at South Philly Jam and a Mexican death match at November to Remember. Misterio Jr. went on to have a series of matches with ECW newcomer Juventud Guerrera during early 1996. At Big Apple Blizzard Blast in February 1996, he successfully defended his WWA Welterweight Championship against Guerrera. He wrestled his final bout for ECW at Big Ass Extreme Bash in March 1996, defeating Guerrera.

=== Wrestle Association-R (1995–1996) ===
Misterio Jr. made his first appearance in Japan on December 13, 1995, as part of Genichiro Tenryu's Wrestle Association-R (WAR) promotion, losing to Psicosis in a bout in the Ryōgoku Kokugikan in Tokyo as part of the Super J-Cup show. He returned to WAR in April 1996, teaming with Último Dragón to face other cruiserweight wrestlers including Psicosis, Damián 666, Lion Do, and Yuji Yasuraoka in a series of tag team matches. In July 1996 at WAR's 4th Anniversary Show, Misterio Jr. defeated Juventud Guerrera for the WWA World Welterweight Championship. (His reign lasted until February 1997, when he lost to El Hijo del Santo in a match promoted by Promo Azteca.) Misterio Jr. made his final appearance with WAR in December 1996 at "Ryōgoku Crush Night!", unsuccessfully challenging Último Dragón for the J-Crown.

=== World Championship Wrestling (1996–2001) ===
==== Cruiserweight division (1996–1998) ====
Mysterio made his World Championship Wrestling (WCW) debut on June 16, 1996, at The Great American Bash, challenging Dean Malenko for the WCW Cruiserweight Championship in a losing effort. At Bash at the Beach on July 7, he defeated Psicosis in a #1 contender's match to earn another opportunity at the Cruiserweight Championship, which he won for the first time by defeating Malenko the next night on WCW Monday Nitro. He successfully defended the title against Ultimate Dragon at Hog Wild on August 10, Malenko at Clash of the Champions XXXIII five days later, and Super Caló at Fall Brawl on September 15. On October 27, at Halloween Havoc, he lost the title back to Malenko. Mysterio challenged Ultimate Dragon for the J-Crown Championship in a losing effort at World War 3 on November 24.

On February 23, 1997, he faced Prince Iaukea for the WCW World Television Championship at SuperBrawl VII, but lost after being attacked by Lord Steven Regal. Mysterio also lost a title rematch at Uncensored on March 16. Soon after, Mysterio began a feud with the New World Order (nWo), culminating when he lost a Mexican Death match to nWo member Konnan at Road Wild on August 9. Mysterio was then involved in a feud with his real-life friend and Cruiserweight Champion Eddie Guerrero, whom he defeated in a Title vs. Mask match at Halloween Havoc on October 26 to win the Cruiserweight Championship for the second time. On the November 10 episode of Nitro, he lost the title back to Guerrero, as well as in a rematch at World War 3 on November 23. On the January 15, 1998, episode of WCW Thunder, Mysterio defeated Juventud to win his third Cruiserweight Championship, but lost it nine days later to Chris Jericho at Souled Out. After the match, Jericho continued the beating by using a toolbox he found at ringside. This storyline was used to cover Mysterio's need for a knee operation that kept him out of the ring for six months. At Bash at the Beach on July 12, Mysterio returned and defeated Jericho for his fourth Cruiserweight championship. The next night, however, the result was overturned and the belt returned to Jericho due to Dean Malenko interfering.

Later that year, Eddie Guerrero formed a Mexican stable known as the Latino World Order (LWO) (a spin off of New World Order) that included nearly every luchador in the promotion. Mysterio continually refused to join and feuded with Guerrero and the LWO members, including winning a match against longtime rival and LWO member Psicosis in a match at Road Wild on August 8. He was forced to join the group after losing a match to Eddie Guerrero. Mysterio's on-and-off tag team partner Billy Kidman joined him during the feud with LWO, wrestling against the LWO despite Mysterio being a part of the group. Mysterio faced Kidman for the Cruiserweight Championship at Starrcade on December 27, but was unsuccessful in a triangle match also involving Juventud. On January 17, 1999, at Souled Out, Mysterio failed to win the title from Kidman in a four-way match that also included Psicosis and Juventud.

==== Unmasking; "Giant Killer" (1998–1999) ====
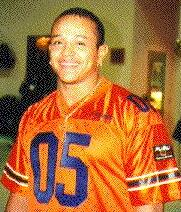
Mysterio unmasked in 1999

After the two factions of nWo reformed, they demanded that the LWO disband. Mysterio refused to take off his LWO colors and was attacked by the nWo as a result. This led to a match at SuperBrawl IX on February 21, where Mysterio and tag partner Konnan lost a "Hair vs. Mask match" against Kevin Nash and Scott Hall, forcing Mysterio to remove his mask. After the match, he phoned his uncle to tell him the news. Mysterio has publicly expressed his disappointment over being unmasked:

I was strongly against it! I don't think WCW understood what the mask meant to me, to my fans and to my family. It was a very bad move on their behalf. The fans wanted Rey Mysterio with the mask and losing it hurt me a lot. It was also frustrating that it didn't come as the climax to a feud with another masked wrestler, but in a throwaway match. The same thing happened to Juventud and Psicosis and psychologically wise it was a bad move by Eric Bischoff. I think the fans understand that I was in a position where I had no option. I either had to lose my mask or lose my job.

Following SuperBrawl, Mysterio became a "giant killer" by defeating large opponents such as Kevin Nash, Bam Bam Bigelow, and Scott Norton. At Uncensored on March 14, he lost to Nash after interference from Lex Luger. The next night, on the March 15 episode of Nitro, he defeated Billy Kidman to win his fourth Cruiserweight Championship. On the March 22 episode of Nitro, Mysterio got his first shot at the WCW World Heavyweight Championship against champion Ric Flair when the names of (allegedly) nearly everyone in the company were put into a hat and a lottery was held. El Dandy was the lottery winner, but he was injured, and Mysterio took the shot instead. The match ended with a disqualification win for Flair, even though Arn Anderson's interference on Flair's behalf should have theoretically disqualified Flair. The following week, Mysterio and Kidman defeated Flair's Four Horsemen stablemates Chris Benoit and Dean Malenko to win the WCW World Tag Team Championship, making Mysterio a double champion. Mysterio successfully defended his Cruiserweight Championship against his tag team partner Kidman at Spring Stampede on April 11 before losing the title on the April 19 episode of Nitro to Psicosis in a fatal four-way match that also involved Juventud Guerrera and Blitzkrieg. On the following episode of Nitro, he defeated Psicosis to win his fifth Cruiserweight Championship. At Slamboree on May 9, Mysterio and Kidman lost the World Tag Team titles to Raven and Perry Saturn in a triangle match, also involving former champions Benoit and Malenko.

==== No Limit Soldiers; Filthy Animals (1999–2001) ====
In mid-1999, Mysterio and Konnan joined Master P's No Limit Soldiers and feuded with the West Texas Rednecks. At The Great American Bash on June 13, they defeated Rednecks members Curt Hennig and Bobby Duncum Jr., and at Bash at the Beach on July 11, won a four-on-four elimination tag team match against them. After Master P's departure from WCW, Mysterio formed a stable with Eddie Guerrero and Billy Kidman known as the Filthy Animals, turning heel for the first and only time in his career. The Filthy Animals defeated Dead Pool in six-man tag team matches at Road Wild on August 14 and Fall Brawl on September 12. On the August 19 episode of Thunder, Mysterio lost the cruiserweight title to Lenny Lane.

On the October 18 episode of Nitro, Mysterio and Konnan defeated Harlem Heat to win the World Tag Team Championship, however, Mysterio was injured during the match and was sidelined. Kidman substituted for Mysterio and teamed with Konnan during their title defense against Harlem Heat and the First Family at Halloween Havoc six days later, where the Filthy Animals lost the titles back to Harlem Heat. Mysterio returned in early 2000 and remained a steady performer, eventually joining the New Blood faction, opposing the Millionaire's Club. On the August 14 episode of Nitro, Mysterio and Juventud defeated The Great Muta and Vampiro to win the World Tag Team Championship. They were stripped of the title after Ernest Miller pinned Disco Inferno with the stipulation that if he pinned Disco, Mysterio and Guerrera would be stripped of the title. At Fall Brawl on September 17, the Filthy Animals fought The Natural Born Thrillers to a no contest in an elimination tag team match. Mysterio reformed his tag team with Kidman and challenged for the World Tag Team Championship in a triangle match at Halloween Havoc on October 29, facing the champions Natural Born Thrillers and The Boogie Knights in a losing effort.

At Millennium Final on November 16, Mysterio and Kidman lost to KroniK, but avenged their loss at Mayhem ten days later against KroniK and Alex Wright in a handicap match. At Starrcade on December 17, The Filthy Animals lost to The Harris Brothers and Jeff Jarrett in a Bunkhouse Brawl. After this, the Filthy Animals starting feuding with Team Canada, to whom they lost in a Penalty Box match at Sin on January 14, 2001. At SuperBrawl Revenge on February 18, Mysterio unsuccessfully challenged Chavo Guerrero Jr. for the Cruiserweight Championship. Kidman and Mysterio participated in a cruiserweight tag team tournament for the newly created WCW Cruiserweight Tag Team Championship and advanced to the final round, where they lost to Elix Skipper and Kid Romeo at Greed on March 18. On the final episode of Nitro on March 26, they defeated Skipper and Romeo in a rematch to win the WCW Cruiserweight Tag Team Championship before WCW was sold to the World Wrestling Federation (WWF).

=== Consejo Mundial de Lucha Libre (2001) ===
Mysterio Jr. debuted in the Mexican promotion Consejo Mundial de Lucha Libre (CMLL) in November 2001. His first match took place at a show in Arena México in Mexico City that was broadcast by Televisa; at the show, he teamed with Antifaz del Norte, Black Warrior, and Felino to defeat Black Tiger, Juventud Guerrera, Nicho el Millonario, and Virus. He had a short feud with the villainous stable La Familia de Tijuana. He wrestled his final match for CMLL in December 2001, teaming with El Hijo del Santo, El Hombre Sin Nombre, and Mr. Águila to defeat Juventud Guerrera and members of La Familia de Tijuana in Puebla.

=== Independent circuit and Puerto Rico (2002) ===
Upon his return to the US, he worked in Independent Wrestling Association Mid-South, the Xcitement Wrestling Federation and the Heartland Wrestling Association, with the likes of Eddie Guerrero and CM Punk. Mysterio traveled to Puerto Rico for the World Wrestling Council and defeated Eddie Colón for the WWC World Junior Heavyweight Championship on January 6, 2002, holding the belt until losing it back to Colón on April 6.

=== World Wrestling Entertainment / WWE (2002–2015) ===
==== Championship reigns (2002–2004) ====
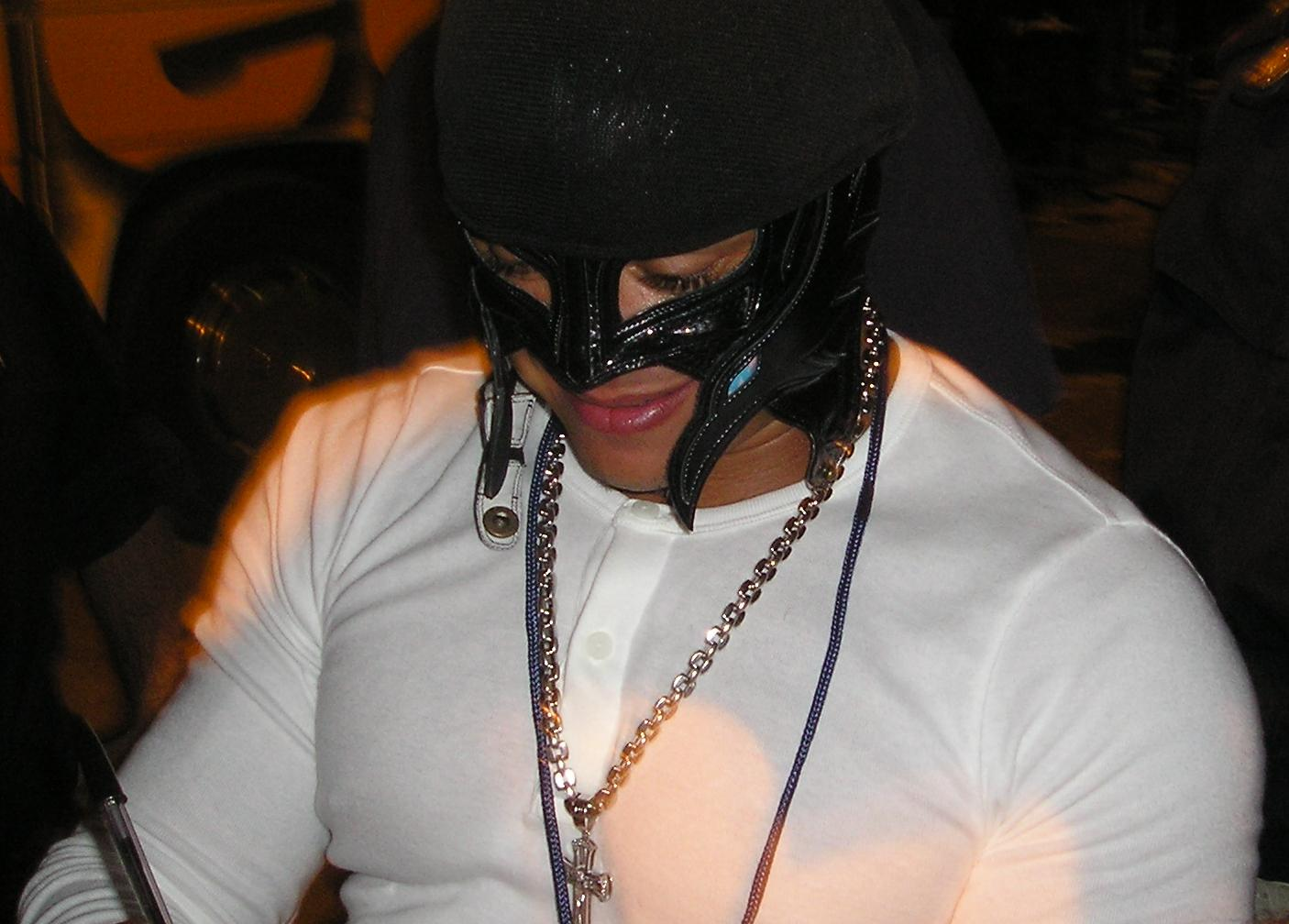
Mysterio signing autographs in 2004

In June 2002, Mysterio signed with World Wrestling Entertainment (WWE), and promos that hyped his debut began airing. The "Jr." was dropped from his name and he was billed simply as Rey Mysterio. Mysterio also resumed wearing his mask.

Mysterio made his WWE debut on the July 25, 2002, episode of SmackDown! as a face, defeating Chavo Guerrero. Mysterio's first feud was with Kurt Angle, culminating in a match at SummerSlam on August 25, which Angle won after forcing Mysterio to submit to the ankle lock. Mysterio later formed a tag team with Edge, participating in a tournament for the newly created and SmackDown!-exclusive WWE Tag Team Championship. Mysterio and Edge lost to Kurt Angle and Chris Benoit in the finals of the tournament at No Mercy on October 20; the match was voted Match of the Year by the Wrestling Observer Newsletter. Mysterio and Edge won the WWE Tag Team Championship when they defeated Angle and Benoit in a two out of three falls match on the November 7 episode of SmackDown!, but lost them to Los Guerreros in a Triple Threat Elimination match at Survivor Series on November 17.

On March 30, 2003, at WrestleMania XIX, Mysterio faced the Cruiserweight Champion Matt Hardy for the title, but lost after interference from Shannon Moore. After earning a title shot in May, Mysterio defeated Hardy on the June 5 episode of SmackDown! to win the Cruiserweight Championship. After losing the championship to Tajiri on the September 25 episode of SmackDown!, Mysterio regained it from Tajiri on the January 1, 2004, episode of SmackDown!. At the Royal Rumble on January 25, Mysterio successfully defended the title against Jamie Noble. Mysterio lost the title to Chavo Guerrero at No Way Out on February 15. At WrestleMania XX on March 14, Mysterio took part in a Cruiserweight Open for the title, where Guerrero retained the title. On the June 17 episode of SmackDown!, Mysterio defeated Chavo Classic to win the title for a third time. Mysterio lost it to Spike Dudley on the July 29 episode of SmackDown! then failed to regain the title on the September 23 episode of SmackDown! and in a fatal four-way match at Survivor Series on November 14.

==== Teaming and feuding with Eddie Guerrero (2004–2005) ====
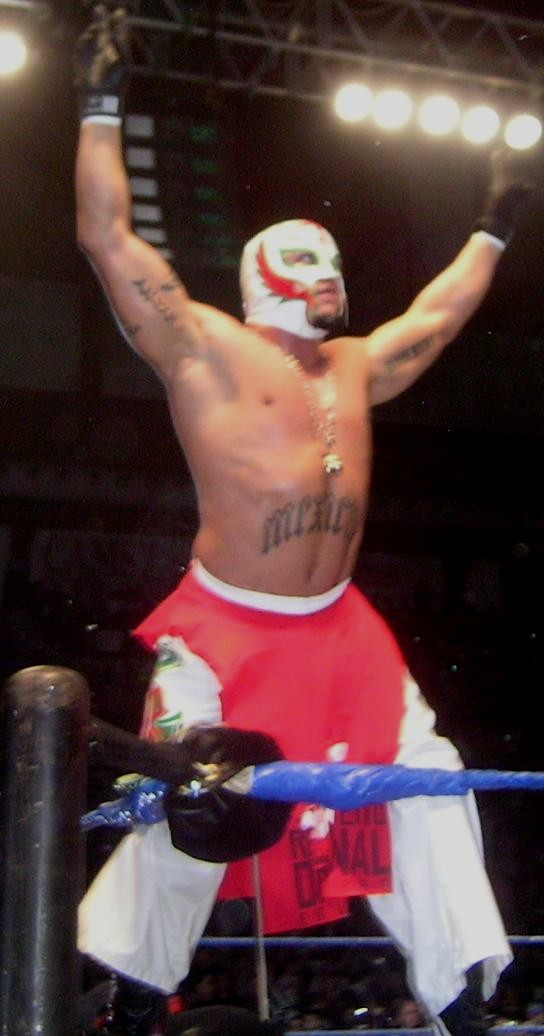
Mysterio during a WWE house show in 2005

During this time, Mysterio formed a tag team with Rob Van Dam and feuded with Kenzo Suzuki and René Duprée. At No Mercy on October 3, Mysterio and Van Dam failed to win the titles from Suzuki and Duprée, but won them in a rematch on the December 9 episode of SmackDown!. Mysterio and Van Dam successfully defended the titles against Suzuki and Duprée at Armageddon on December 12, before losing the titles to the Basham Brothers on the January 13, 2005, episode of SmackDown! after Van Dam was injured.

On February 20, Mysterio teamed up with Eddie Guerrero, winning the WWE Tag Team Championship back from the Basham Brothers at No Way Out. In a departure from traditional booking, Mysterio and Guerrero did not defend their titles at WrestleMania 21 on April 3, but instead had a match against each other, which Mysterio won. On the April 21 episode of SmackDown!, Mysterio and Guerrero lost the WWE Tag Team Championship to MNM (Joey Mercury and Johnny Nitro). The following week, Guerrero abandoned Mysterio, whom he had considered "his family" earlier in the show, during their rematch for the titles, costing them the match. After a street fight against Chavo on the May 5 episode of SmackDown!, Eddie came out and suplexed Mysterio on the steel steps, displaying Eddie's increasing frustration with being unable to defeat Mysterio.

At Judgment Day on May 22, Mysterio defeated Guerrero by disqualification after Guerrero attacked him with a steel chair. On June 12, in the midst of their feud, Mysterio faced and defeated long-time rival Psicosis for the first time in nearly five years at ECW One Night Stand. Guerrero then threatened to reveal a secret he and Mysterio shared involving Mysterio's real life son Dominik, unless Mysterio deferred to Guerrero's authority. At The Great American Bash on July 24, Mysterio defeated Guerrero in a match with a stipulation that if Guerrero lost, he would not tell the secret. Despite this, Guerrero revealed the secret on the following episode of SmackDown!, that he was Dominik's biological father. Guerrero said he knew Mysterio was having trouble starting his own family, so Guerrero left Dominik as a baby with Mysterio and his wife Angie to raise. He threatened to take custody of Dominik, drawing up custody papers and having his lawyer present them to Mysterio. At SummerSlam on August 21, Mysterio defeated Guerrero in a ladder match for the custody of Dominik. On the September 9 episode of SmackDown!, Mysterio lost to Guerrero in a steel cage match, ending their feud.

On November 13, 2005, Eddie Guerrero was found dead in his hotel room in Minneapolis, Minnesota. That same day, at a WWE "Super Show" where SmackDown! and Raw were both taped, Mysterio gave an emotional speech about Guerrero, and in a show of respect, removed his mask (though he put his head down, so his face could not be seen). Mysterio went on to defeat Shawn Michaels in an interbrand match later that night. After the match, Michaels and Mysterio hugged in the ring and Mysterio pointed up to the sky, crying, in memory of Guerrero.

==== World Heavyweight Champion and feud with Chavo Guerrero (2005–2007) ====
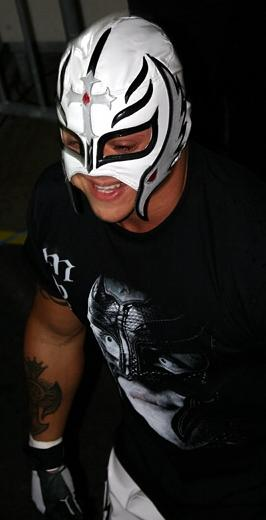
Mysterio at a house show in 2005

Mysterio participated in the main event of Survivor Series on November 27, as part of Team SmackDown! along with Randy Orton, Bobby Lashley, Batista, and John "Bradshaw" Layfield (JBL), defeating Team Raw (Shawn Michaels, Kane, Big Show, Carlito, and Chris Masters). Mysterio faced Big Show, who he eliminated at Survivor Series, in a match billed as "David vs. Goliath" in a SmackDown! special show on November 29, which ended as a "no contest" after interference from Show's tag team partner, Kane. Mysterio continued to feud with Raw's World Tag Team Champions, and found a tag team partner in World Heavyweight Champion Batista. They were booked to face Raw's Kane and Big Show in a tag team match at Armageddon on December 18. Two days before the event, Batista and Mysterio defeated MNM on SmackDown! to win the WWE Tag Team Championship in a match they both dedicated to Guerrero. Mysterio and Batista's match with Big Show and Kane was then billed as "Champions vs. Champions", which they lost. On the December 30 episode of SmackDown!, MNM invoked their rematch clause, defeating Batista and Mysterio after interference from Mark Henry to regain the WWE Tag Team Championship. The following week, Mysterio and Batista lost their rematch for the titles in a steel cage match after interference by Henry.

On January 29, 2006, Mysterio was the second entrant in the Royal Rumble match, setting a record by lasting 62 minutes, winning the match, and earning a world title shot by last eliminating Orton. Orton urged him to put the title shot at stake in a match at No Way Out. Over the following weeks, Orton made disparaging remarks about Eddie Guerrero, which many people, including Orton, felt were unwarranted and distasteful in the wake of Guerrero's death. Orton won at No Way Out on February 19, earning Mysterio's title shot for the World Heavyweight Championship at WrestleMania 22. However, General Manager Theodore Long re-added Mysterio to the WrestleMania title match, making it a triple threat match between Orton, Mysterio, and then-champion, Kurt Angle. At WrestleMania on April 2, Mysterio pinned Orton to become the new World Heavyweight Champion. On the following episode of SmackDown!, Mysterio – billed as an "underdog champion", made his first successful World Heavyweight title defense against Orton. Mysterio retained the title again during a WrestleMania rematch on SmackDown! against Angle three weeks later.

Mysterio quickly moved into a feud with the United States Champion John "Bradshaw" Layfield (JBL), who stated he deserved the World Heavyweight title. This feud saw him face off against three opponents chosen by JBL in the three weeks leading up to their title match at Judgment Day. Mysterio was defeated by Mark Henry and The Great Khali in separate non-title matches before wrestling Kane to a "no contest". On May 21, Mysterio retained his title against JBL at Judgment Day.

The feud intensified when JBL lost the United States Championship to Bobby Lashley five days later on SmackDown! after being tricked by Mysterio to take on all comers like Mysterio himself had. JBL vowed that if he did not win his rematch against Mysterio, he would quit SmackDown!. In their main event match, Mysterio retained the World Heavyweight Championship, causing JBL to leave SmackDown!, until ECW One Night Stand on June 11, when he announced his return as a color commentator.

Mysterio was booked to defend against ECW wrestler Sabu at ECW One Night Stand. In the weeks leading up to his title defense, Mysterio defeated Cruiserweight Champion Gregory Helms in a Champion vs. Champion match, and lost to Rob Van Dam at WWE vs. ECW Head-to-Head on June 7. At ECW One Night Stand, Mysterio retained the title, after he and Sabu were ruled unable to continue following a triple jump DDT through a table by Sabu. Mysterio then retained his title in a match against Mark Henry, winning by disqualification after Chavo Guerrero handed Henry a chair and Mysterio acted as if he was hit, a tactic for which Eddie Guerrero was known.

Mysterio began a feud with King Booker, who won a battle royal to become the number one contender for the World Heavyweight Championship. King Booker attacked Mysterio from behind backstage with the help of King Booker's wife Queen Sharmell. The next week on SmackDown!, Mysterio gained revenge by attacking King Booker and his "court". On July 23, at The Great American Bash, Mysterio lost the World Heavyweight Championship to King Booker after Chavo interfered in the match and turned on Mysterio, hitting him with a steel chair. Guerrero would also cost Mysterio his rematch the following week. At SummerSlam on August 20, Mysterio lost to Guerrero after Vickie Guerrero tried to stop both men from fighting, but accidentally knocked Mysterio off the top turnbuckle. Vickie then turned on Mysterio by hitting him in the back with a steel chair and gave him an injury, thus, siding with Guerrero. On October 8, Mysterio defeated Guerrero in a Falls Count Anywhere match at No Mercy. Subsequently, Guerrero challenged Mysterio to an "I quit" match for the October 20 episode of SmackDown!, which Mysterio lost. During the match, Guerrero injured Mysterio's knee, which was used to write Mysterio out of the storyline for a while to get knee surgery.

Mysterio made his in-ring return at SummerSlam on August 26, 2007, defeating Guerrero, after he obsessed over Mysterio's return as well as wanting to injure Mysterio again. On the August 31 episode of SmackDown!, Mysterio defeated Batista and Finlay in a "Championship Competition" to become the number one contender for the World Heavyweight Championship at Unforgiven, held by The Great Khali. On the following episode of SmackDown!, Mysterio defeated Guerrero in an "I Quit" match after hitting Guerrero's knee with a steel chair repeatedly in a similar manner to which Mysterio had been put out of action, ending the feud. After the match, Batista saved Mysterio from an attack by Khali, making the match at Unforgiven a triple threat match. At Unforgiven on September 16, Mysterio failed to win the title, which was won by Batista.

==== Various storylines (2007–2009) ====
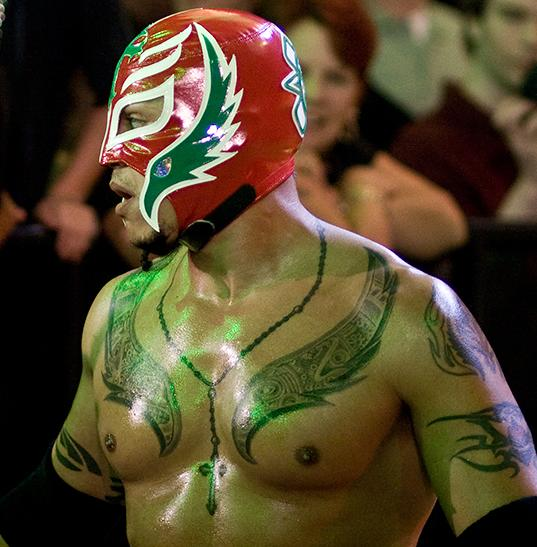
Mysterio in November 2008

Mysterio then began a feud with Finlay, an opponent chosen by JBL. The rivalry was marked as "Fight vs. Flight", contrasting the fighting styles of both wrestlers – Finlay's physicality, versus the high-flying Mysterio. After fighting to a "no contest" at No Mercy on October 7, followed by a double-disqualification in a number one contender's match for Batista's World Heavyweight Championship on the next SmackDown!, Mysterio defeated Finlay in a Stretcher match at Cyber Sunday on October 28. During this feud, Mysterio lost a match to Finlay on the November 9 episode of SmackDown! and was part of the winning team at Survivor Series on November 18, which consisted of both wrestlers on opposing sides (although Mysterio was second to be eliminated).

Mysterio re-entered the World Heavyweight Championship picture on the January 4, 2008, episode of SmackDown! when he won a Beat the Clock challenge for a chance to face the World Heavyweight Champion Edge at the Royal Rumble. At the Royal Rumble on January 27, Mysterio was unsuccessful in winning the championship. WWE's official website announced on February 14 that Mysterio suffered a biceps injury during an overseas tour. Despite the injury, Mysterio faced Edge for the title in a rematch at No Way Out on February 17, which he lost. On the February 22 episode of SmackDown, Mysterio announced that his injury would keep him out of action for at least six months, and he eventually underwent three surgeries within the space of a month.

Mysterio returned on the June 23 episode of Raw, as the first wrestler to be drafted in the 2008 WWE Draft from the SmackDown brand to the Raw brand. Mysterio made his Raw in-ring debut on July 7, pinning Santino Marella after a 619. General Manager Mike Adamle announced that John Cena was injured and that Mysterio would replace him in the Championship Scramble at Unforgiven. The next week, Mysterio made his return to Raw after an extended absence by attacking Kane, turning back numerous claims that Kane had "ended his career". Mysterio then made his in-ring return at Unforgiven on September 7, competing in the World Heavyweight Championship scramble match, which was won by Chris Jericho. Mysterio put his mask on the line in a match at No Mercy on October 5, which he won by disqualification after Kane attacked him with a steel chair. Mysterio defeated Kane again at Cyber Sunday on October 26, this time in a No Holds Barred match, and again at Survivor Series on November 23, when the pair were on opposing sides in a five-on-five elimination match. Mysterio then competed in a number one contender's tournament for the Intercontinental Championship, losing to CM Punk in the finals at Armageddon on December 14. At No Way Out on February 15, 2009, Mysterio competed in the Elimination Chamber match for the World Heavyweight Championship, but was the last man eliminated by Edge.

==== Intercontinental Champion (2009–2010) ====
Mysterio in 2010

At WrestleMania 25 on April 5, Mysterio defeated John "Bradshaw" Layfield (JBL) in 21 seconds to capture the Intercontinental Championship. His win made Mysterio the twenty-first Triple Crown Champion in WWE history. Mysterio was drafted back to the SmackDown brand during the 2009 WWE Draft on the April 13 episode of Raw, making the Intercontinental Championship exclusive to SmackDown for the first time since August 2002.

He then entered into an extensive feud with Chris Jericho, retaining his title against him at Judgment Day on May 17. At Extreme Rules on June 7, Mysterio lost the title after being unmasked and pinned by Jericho. Mysterio and Jericho were booked in a Title vs. Mask match that was scheduled for The Bash on June 28, which Mysterio won, regaining the title. Mysterio retained the title once more against Jericho on the July 10 episode of SmackDown to end their feud, before he was attacked by Dolph Ziggler after the match. He successfully defended the title against Ziggler at both Night of Champions on July 26 and SummerSlam on August 23.

On August 2, WWE announced that Mysterio would be suspended for 30 days, effective September 2, for violating the company's Wellness Policy. Before the suspension, he lost the title on the September 1 (aired September 4) episode of SmackDown against John Morrison. In an interview with Mexican newspaper Record, Mysterio stated that he was suspended for a drug he was using for his knee and arm. Mysterio stated that he had a prescription for the drug, but was unable to produce it in time to prevent his suspension due to being on vacation and doing a promotional tour.

Later that month, Mysterio returned and was revealed as Batista's partner in a match against Jeri-Show (Chris Jericho and Big Show) for the Unified WWE Tag Team Championship at Hell in a Cell on October 4, which they lost. At Bragging Rights on October 25, they participated in a Fatal 4 Way match for the World Heavyweight Championship. During the match, Mysterio prevented Batista of winning the title and, after the match was attacked by Batista. On November 22, Mysterio lost to Batista at Survivor Series by technical knockout. Their feud moved around the World Heavyweight Championship, when Mysterio defeated Batista on the December 18 episode of SmackDown to gain a title shot against The Undertaker on the following episode of SmackDown, but the match ended in a no contest after Batista interfered. On the January 15, 2010, episode of SmackDown, they faced off again in a number one contender's steel cage match, where Mysterio won. However, Mysterio lost the title match to The Undertaker at the Royal Rumble on January 31.

In February, Mysterio began a feud with Punk that also involved Punk's Straight Edge Society. During the Elimination Chamber match for the World Heavyweight Championship at the namesake event on February 21, Mysterio eliminated Punk. Mysterio continued to feud with Punk and had a match at WrestleMania XXVI on March 28 with the stipulation that if Mysterio were to lose at WrestleMania, he would be forced to join the SES. After Mysterio defeated Punk at WrestleMania, they faced again at Extreme Rules on April 25, with Mysterio losing to Punk in a match where Punk should have had his head shaved if he lost. At Over the Limit on May 23, Mysterio faced CM Punk again with both previous stipulations in place (Mysterio's allegiance to the SES and Punk's hair); Mysterio defeated Punk, resulting in Punk's head being shaved.

==== World championship reigns (2010–2011) ====
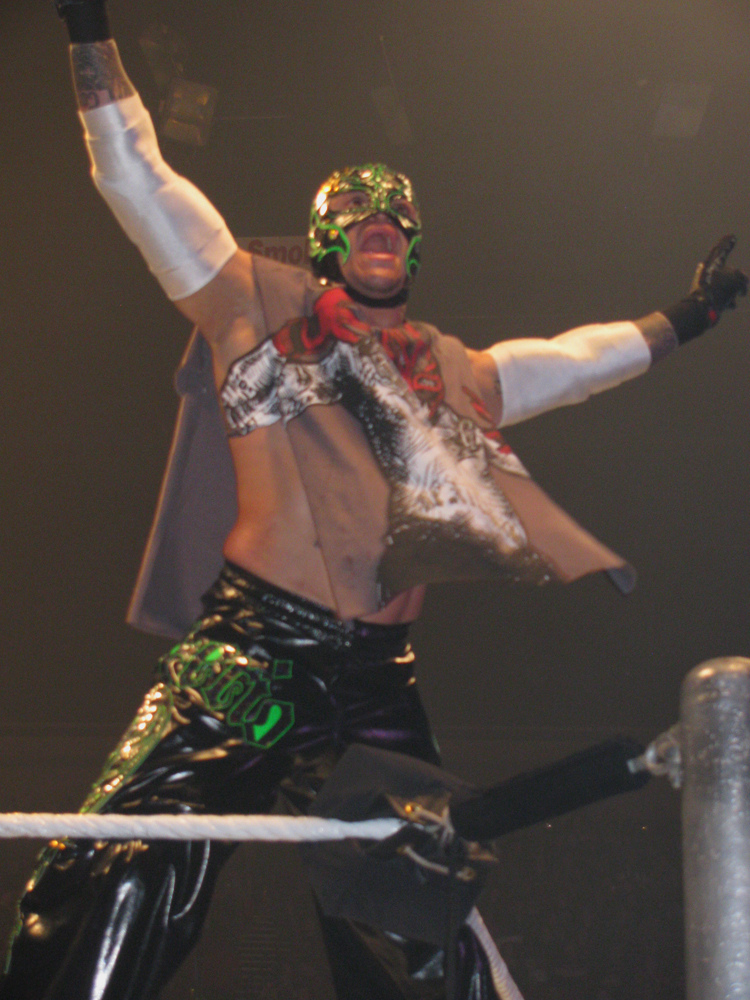
Mysterio in 2011

At Fatal 4-Way on June 20, Mysterio defeated Jack Swagger, Big Show, and CM Punk to win the World Heavyweight Championship for the second time. On July 18, at Money in the Bank, he retained the title against Swagger before Kane, who had won the SmackDown Money in the Bank ladder match earlier that night, cashed in his Money in the Bank briefcase, ending Mysterio's reign at 28 days. He had a rematch for the title at SummerSlam on August 15, but he was defeated.

Mysterio then entered a feud with the debuting Alberto Del Rio, a Mexican wrestler who portrayed a high-class aristocrat. During Del Rio's debut on the August 20 episode of SmackDown, Mysterio lost to Del Rio by submission. They both participated at Bragging Rights on October 24 as part of the victorious Team SmackDown, but during the match, Del Rio attacked Mysterio. At Survivor Series on November 21, Mysterio and Del Rio led two opposing teams as part of the traditional Survivor Series match, where Team Mysterio won. They also participated at TLC: Tables, Ladders & Chairs on December 19 in a fatal four-way Tables, Ladders, and Chairs match for the World Heavyweight Championship, which was won by Edge. His feud with Del Rio culminated on the January 7, 2011, episode of SmackDown in a two out of three falls match, which Del Rio won by countout.

On the January 21 episode of SmackDown, Mysterio accidentally broke the nose of Cody Rhodes when he hit him with a 619. WWE used this accident to start a feud and, as part of the storyline, Rhodes began to wear a mask and they wrestled at WrestleMania XXVII on April 3, where Mysterio lost to Rhodes. Mysterio defeated Rhodes on the April 22 episode of SmackDown and at Extreme Rules on May 1 in a Falls Count Anywhere match, ending their feud.

In the 2011 WWE Draft, Mysterio was drafted to the Raw brand. Mysterio then reignited his feud with CM Punk, with the pair exchanging victories on consecutive episodes of Raw. The feud culminated in a match at Capitol Punishment on June 19, where Punk emerged victorious. On July 25, Mysterio won a tournament for the vacant WWE Championship to win his first WWE Championship, but he lost the title to John Cena later that night. On the August 15 episode of Raw, Mysterio received a rematch for the WWE Championship against new champion Alberto Del Rio, but lost to him via submission. Mysterio suffered an injury in late August.

==== Teaming with Sin Cara (2012–2013) ====
On April 26, 2012, WWE reported that Mysterio had been suspended for 60 days due to his second violation of the company's Talent Wellness Program policy and that his suspension would expire on June 25. After his return in July, Mysterio faced The Miz for the Intercontinental Championship at SummerSlam on August 19 and in a fatal-four-way match at Night of Champions on September 16, but lost both times. In September, he was paired with Sin Cara as a tag team. They entered into a feud with The Prime Time Players (Titus O'Neil and Darren Young), defeating them at Hell in a Cell on October 28, as well as O'Neil and Young's team at Survivor Series on November 18. At TLC: Tables, Ladders & Chairs on December 16, they lost to Rhodes and Damien Sandow in a tables match. On the following episode of SmackDown, Mysterio and Cara were written off television after being attacked by The Shield and Mysterio suffered an injury, dissolving the team. This was done for Mysterio to take time off and Sin Cara underwent knee surgery. In March, Mysterio took another leave of absence due to a legitimate knee injury, explained in storyline as an attack by Mark Henry.

==== Final storylines and departure (2013–2015) ====
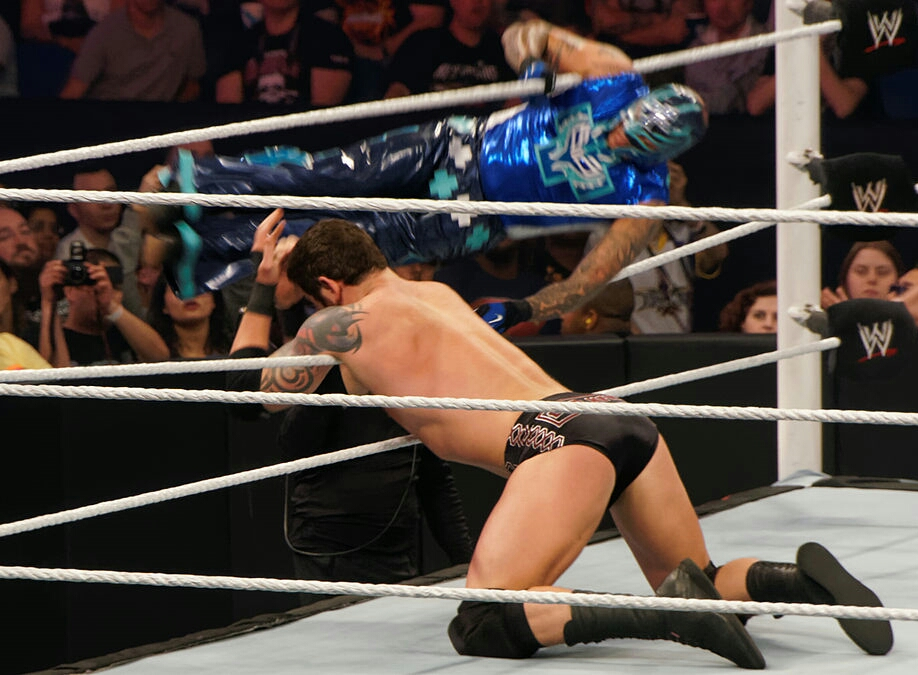
Mysterio's last WWE in-ring match before his return in 2018 was a loss to Bad News Barrett in April 2014.

After eight months, Mysterio returned at a WWE live event on October 17, 2013, and returned to television as part of the Spanish commentary team at Hell in a Cell on October 27. On the November 18 episode of Raw, Mysterio saved CM Punk and Daniel Bryan from an attack by The Wyatt Family and The Real Americans (Jack Swagger and Antonio Cesaro), which led to Mysterio being part of a 10-man elimination tag team match at Survivor Series on November 24, in which Mysterio's team lost after he was eliminated by sole survivor Roman Reigns. At TLC: Tables, Ladders and Chairs on December 15, Mysterio and Big Show unsuccessfully challenged Cody Rhodes and Goldust for the WWE Tag Team Championship in a fatal four-way match also involving RybAxel (Ryback and Curtis Axel) and The Real Americans. At WrestleMania XXX on April 6, 2014, Mysterio competed in the André the Giant Memorial Battle Royal, but was eliminated by eventual winner Cesaro.

On the April 7 episode of Raw, Mysterio lost to a returning Bad News Barrett. He subsequently decided to take time off to heal a wrist injury. During his hiatus, it was reported that Mysterio wanted to leave WWE, but WWE had extended his contract without his approval. He did not return to WWE programming, and instead appeared in a video message at AAA's Triplemanía XXII and also visited Lucha Underground. On February 26, 2015, WWE announced that Mysterio's WWE contract had expired, ending his nearly 13-year tenure with the company.

=== Lucha Libre AAA Worldwide (2015–2016) ===
Five days after being released from WWE, it was announced that Mysterio had agreed to work for Lucha Libre AAA Worldwide. He made his in-ring return as part of AAA's 2015 pay-per-view Rey de Reyes ("King of Kings") on March 18, where he and Myzteziz (formerly Sin Cara in WWE) defeated the Los Perros del Mal team of El Hijo del Perro Aguayo and Pentagón Jr., with Mysterio scoring the winning pin.

On March 20, during another tag team match, a dropkick from Mysterio resulted in Perro Aguayo Jr.'s death in the ring. Mysterio delivered the dropkick to Perro's back, causing him to fall to the second rope, setting him up for Mysterio's signature "619" wrestling move, which involves Mysterio running towards the rope, grabbing it, and spinning around 180°, hitting the person on the face with his legs. Mysterio, seeing that something was wrong due to Perro becoming limp, purposely missed. The other wrestlers continued performing while each coming up and checking on Perro. They quickly finished the match after realizing that something serious had happened. The referee, wrestlers, and locker room crew came out and took Perro out using a piece of plywood. He was pronounced dead by the doctors later that night. His official cause of death was ruled as cardiac arrest, due to a cervical stroke caused by three fractured vertebrae.

On May 24, 2015, Mysterio came together with Myzteziz and El Patrón Alberto to form the "Dream Team" for AAA's Lucha Libre World Cup. The trio eventually won the tournament, defeating Johnny Mundo, Matt Hardy and Mr. Anderson in the finals with Mysterio pinning Mundo for the win. For Triplemanía XXIII, AAA's biggest show of the year, a "dream match" between Mysterio and Myzteziz took place. Both wrestlers teamed during their time in WWE and AAA but had never competed against each other. Mysterio was victorious, forcing Myzteziz to submit to a Fujiwara armbar. After the match, Myzteziz turned rudo and sprayed mist at Mysterio's face, challenging him to a Lucha de Apuestas.

In early February 2016, AAA announced that Mysterio had left AAA due to financial issues between Mysterio and AAA. Despite not working directly for AAA, Mysterio Jr. participated in the 2016 Lucha Libre World Cup alongside Dr. Wagner Jr. and Dragon Azteca Jr., known as "Team Mexico International"; the trio finished in third place.

=== Return to the independent circuit (2015–2018) ===
Rey Mysterio has appeared on a number of independent shows, facing the likes of Alberto El Patron in Qatar Pro Wrestling, Amazing Red in House of Glory, AJ Styles at a 5 Star Wrestling show in the UK, and Ricochet in Xtreme Wrestling Alliance (XWA).

Mysterio faced fellow WWE alumnus Kurt Angle on March 20, 2016, for the upstart URFight promotion, defeating Angle in a two-falls match with assistance from rapper Riff Raff. On April 30, 2017, at the WCPW Pro Wrestling World Cup, Mysterio won the Mexico Leg with Penta El Zero M, defeating Alberto El Patron in the semi-finals, and longtime rival Juventud Guerrera in the finals.

Mysterio teamed up with Mexican luchadors Fenix and Bandido for the main event of the indy super show All In on September 1, 2018, losing to The Golden Elite team of Kota Ibushi and The Young Bucks (Nick and Matt Jackson).

=== Lucha Underground (2015–2016) ===
Mysterio debuted in the Los Angeles, California-based Lucha Underground promotion on December 12, 2015, as part of its second season. In his first bout, he competed in the Aztec Warfare II for the Lucha Underground Championship, which was won by Matanza Cueto. Subsequently, Mysterio, Dragon Azteca Jr., and Prince Puma entered a tournament for the Lucha Underground Trios Championship, defeating Cage, Johnny Mundo, and Taya in the first round, then defeating three other teams in the tournament final on January 10, 2016, to win the titles. Their reign lasted until January 17, 2016, when they lost to Jack Evans, Johnny Mundo, and P. J. Black. At Ultima Lucha Dos on January 31, Mysterio defeated Puma.

In March 2016, Mysterio began feuding with Chavo Guerrero Jr., culminating in a "Loser Leaves Lucha" match in which Mysterio defeated Guerrero.

In April 2016, Mysterio competed in the Aztec Warfare III match for the Lucha Underground Championship, which was won by Sexy Star.

In June 2016, Mysterio unsuccessfully challenged Johnny Mundo for the Lucha Underground Championship. He made his final appearance with Lucha Underground later that month, losing to Matanza Cueto. It was subsequently reported that Mysterio would not return as he had chosen not to renew his contract with Lucha Underground.

=== Lucha Libre AAA Worldwide (2018) ===
On June 3, 2018, Mysterio returned to Lucha Libre AAA Worldwide (AAA) at Verano de Escándalo, competing in a three-way match for the AAA Mega Championship against Rey Wegner and Jeff Jarrett, with Jarrett winning.

=== New Japan Pro-Wrestling (2018) ===
Rey Mysterio made his New Japan Pro-Wrestling (NJPW) debut on June 9, 2018, as part of its Dominion 6.9 in Osaka-jo Hall show. Mysterio teamed up with Hiroshi Tanahashi and Jushin Thunder Liger, losing to the Bullet Club team of Adam Page, Cody, and Marty Scurll. He returned to NJPW on August 12, 2018, for a show in the Nippon Budokan, teaming with KUSHIDA and Pro-Wrestler Sengoku Enbu to defeat CHAOS.

=== Return to WWE (2018–present) ===
==== United States Champion (2018–2020) ====
In 2018, Mysterio made two surprise appearances at Royal Rumble on January 28 and Greatest Royal Rumble on April 27, but lost both matches. On September 19, it was confirmed he had signed a two-year contract with WWE.

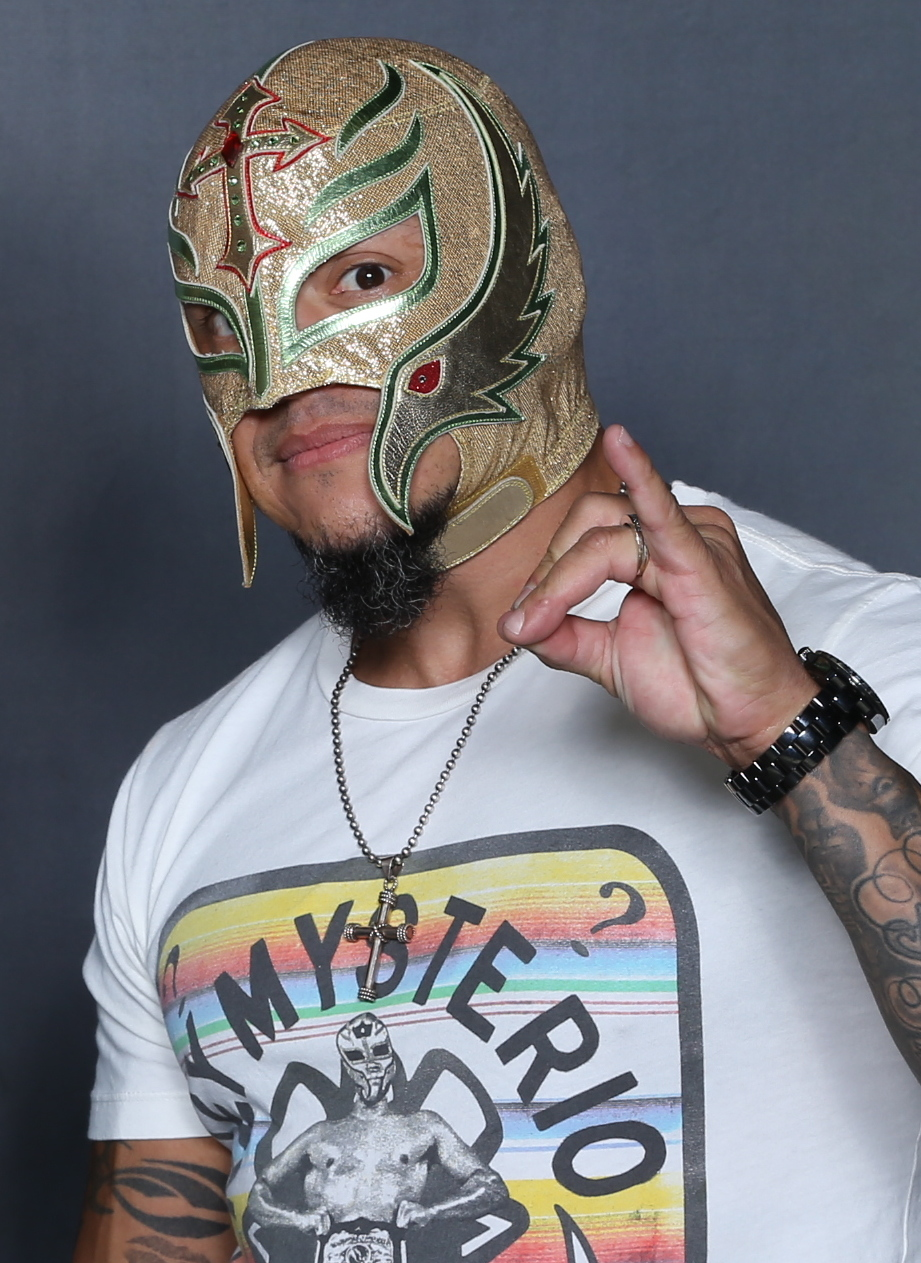
Mysterio in July 2018

Mysterio participated in the WWE World Cup at Crown Jewel on November 2, defeating Randy Orton in the first round but lost to The Miz in the semi-finals. After weeks of attacks by Orton, Mysterio faced Orton on the November 20 episode of SmackDown Live, but lost. At Survivor Series on November 18, Mysterio competed as part of Team SmackDown in the Survivor Series match, but was eliminated by Braun Strowman, and his team lost to Team Raw. On December 16, at TLC: Tables, Ladders & Chairs, Mysterio defeated Orton in a chairs match, ending their feud. At the Royal Rumble on January 27, 2019, Mysterio entered the Royal Rumble match at No. 25, but was eliminated by Orton.

In February, Mysterio began challenging for the United States Championship. He failed to win the title from Samoa Joe at Fastlane on March 10 and WrestleMania 35 on April 7, where he was squashed by Joe in 58 seconds. After being drafted to Raw as part of the Superstar Shake-up, Mysterio won the title from Joe at Money in the Bank on May 19, becoming the twenty-first WWE Grand Slam Champion in the process. However, on the June 3 episode of Raw, Mysterio announced that he would return the title to Joe due to suffering an injury. Mysterio returned from injury one month later.

On the September 23 episode of Raw, Mysterio won a fatal five-way elimination match, earning him a Universal Championship opportunity against Seth Rollins. However, the following week on Raw, Mysterio and his son, Dominik, were brutally attacked by Brock Lesnar, resulting in a storyline injury for the latter. On the October 4 episode of SmackDown, Mysterio assisted the debut of Cain Velasquez to attack Lesnar after the latter's WWE Championship win. At Crown Jewel on October 31, Lesnar defeated Velasquez by submission and continued to apply the Kimura Lock after the match had concluded until Mysterio attacked Lesnar with a chair. The following week, Lesnar quit SmackDown to move to Raw in order to seek revenge against Mysterio, who had been drafted to Raw. At Survivor Series on November 24, Mysterio lost to Lesnar despite interference from Dominik.

Mysterio won a fatal-four-way match on the November 25 episode of Raw to earn a match for the United States Championship, regaining the title by defeating A.J. Styles. On the December 9 episode of Raw, he successfully defended the title against Styles, before losing it to Andrade during a house show at Madison Square Garden on December 26. He attempted to win the title back from Andrade on the January 6 and 20 episodes of Raw, in a losing effort.

==== Teaming with Dominik Mysterio (2020–2022) ====
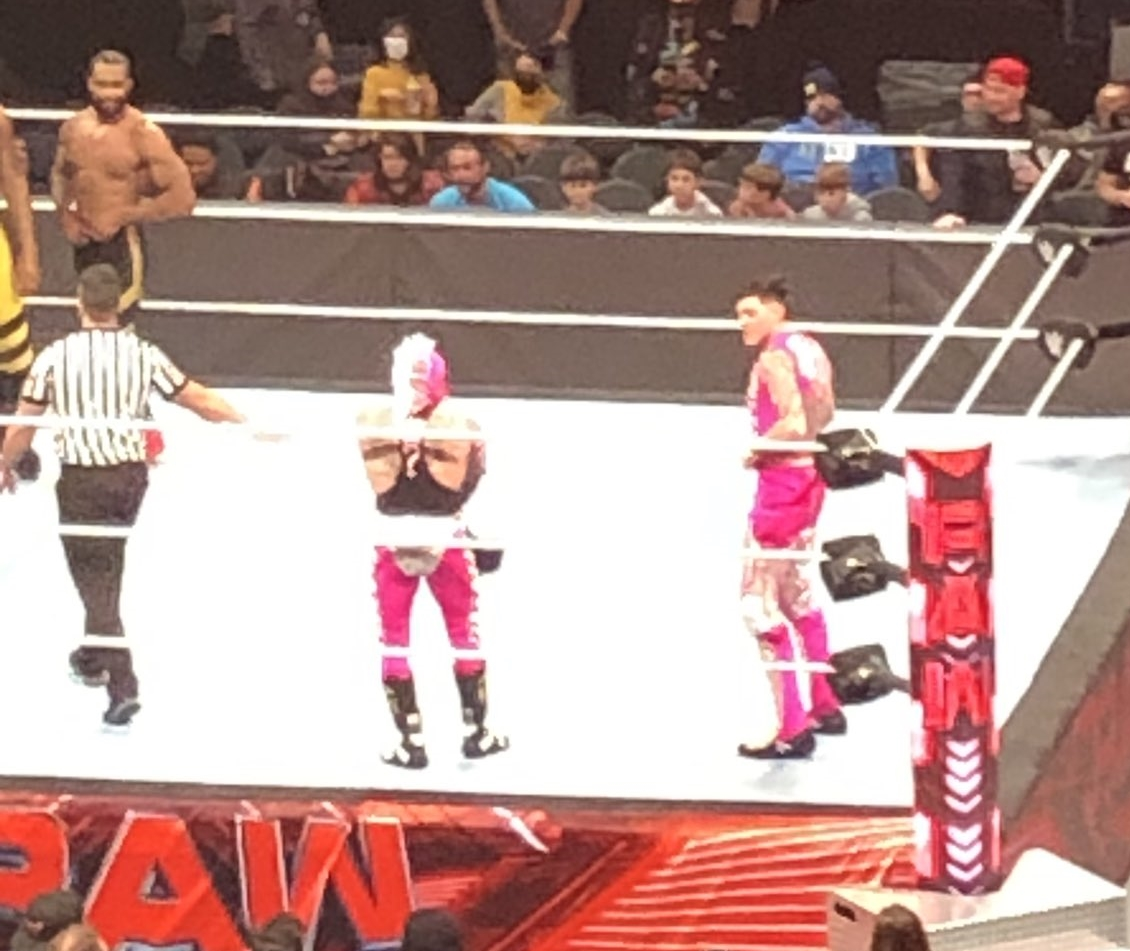
The Mysterios during a tag team match against the Street Profits in December 2021

In May 2020, Mysterio began feuding with Seth Rollins, who used the corner of steel steps to pierce Mysterio's eye and take him out of action. At The Horror Show at Extreme Rules on July 19, Mysterio lost to Rollins in an Eye for an Eye match. On August 30, Mysterio and his son, Dominik Mysterio, defeated Rollins and Murphy at Payback. As part of the 2020 Draft, Mysterio was drafted to the SmackDown brand. Mysterio and Rollins faced each other in a No Holds Barred Final Chapter match on the November 13 episode of SmackDown, which Mysterio won after assistance from Murphy, who turned on Rollins, ending their feud. At Royal Rumble on January 31, 2021, Mysterio entered at No. 26, but was eliminated by Omos.

Following the Royal Rumble, Mysterio began teaming with Dominik. At WrestleMania Backlash on May 16, they defeated Dolph Ziggler and Robert Roode to win the WWE SmackDown Tag Team Championship, becoming the first ever father-son tag team champions in WWE history. On the June 4 episode of SmackDown, the Mysterios retained their titles against The Usos, albeit with controversy as the referee failed to notice Jimmy's shoulder was lifted. After Adam Pearce and Sonya Deville granted a rematch later that night, the Mysterios again retained their titles after Roman Reigns interfered and attacked them, causing a disqualification. On the June 18 episode of SmackDown, Mysterio lost to Reigns in a Hell in a Cell match. At the Money in the Bank pre-show on July 18, the Mysterios lost the titles to the Usos, ending their reign at 63 days. They failed to regain the titles at SummerSlam on August 21.

As part of the 2021 Draft, both Rey and Dominik were drafted to the Raw brand. Rey, along with Dominik, were then involved in a feud with The Miz, whom Rey defeated at the Elimination Chamber pre-show on February 19. The feud grew to involve social media star Logan Paul, culminating in a tag team match between the Mysterios and Miz and Paul on Night 1 of WrestleMania 38 on April 2, which the Mysterios lost.

Over the following weeks, The Mysterios began a feud with The Judgment Day (Finn Balor, Damian Priest, and Rhea Ripley), who repeatedly attempted to have Dominik join the stable. At SummerSlam on July 30, the Mysterios defeated Bálor and Priest after interference from a returning Edge. At Clash at the Castle on September 3, Rey and Edge defeated Bálor and Priest. After the match, Dominik hit Edge with a low blow and hit a clothesline on Rey, thus disbanding the Mysterios. On the October 14 episode of SmackDown, he was transferred to the SmackDown brand, refusing to fight his son. Later that night, he won a fatal four-way match for an Intercontinental Championship match against Gunther, which he lost on the November 4 episode of SmackDown.

==== Latino World Order (2023–2026) ====
At the Royal Rumble on January 28, 2023, Rey was scheduled to enter the Royal Rumble match at No. 17, but was unable to compete in storyline due to presumably being attacked by Dominik, who entered the match at No. 18.

On March 10, WWE announced that Mysterio would be inducted into the WWE Hall of Fame as a part of the Class of 2023. After weeks of continuous torment by Dominik, on the March 24 episode of SmackDown, Rey attacked Dominik after he disrespected his mother and sister, accepting his challenge for a match at WrestleMania 39. On the following episode of SmackDown, Rey would reform the Latino World Order by gifting LWO shirts to Legado Del Fantasma (Santos Escobar, Zelina Vega, Joaquin Wilde, and Cruz Del Toro), as the group had aided Mysterio against The Judgment Day for several weeks prior. At Night 1 of WrestleMania 39 on April 1, Rey defeated Dominik with help from Bad Bunny.

In July, Mysterio competed in the United States Title Invitational Tournament, where he was defeated by LWO stablemate Escobar in the finals via referee stoppage, after suffering from whiplash. On the August 11 episode of SmackDown, after Escobar was rendered unable to compete in his title match due to an attack from the champion, Austin Theory, Mysterio took Escobar's place and defeated Theory to capture his third United States Championship. At Payback on September 2, he defeated Theory in a rematch to retain the title. On the September 29 episode of SmackDown, Mysterio successfully defended the title against Escobar. After the match, they were attacked by The Street Profits (Angelo Dawkins and Montez Ford). At Fastlane on October 7, Mysterio, Escobar and the returning Carlito defeated Bobby Lashley and The Street Profits in a six-man tag team match. On November 4, at Crown Jewel, Mysterio lost the United States Championship to Logan Paul after Escobar placed brass knuckles in the ring, which Paul used on Mysterio, ending his reign at 85 days.

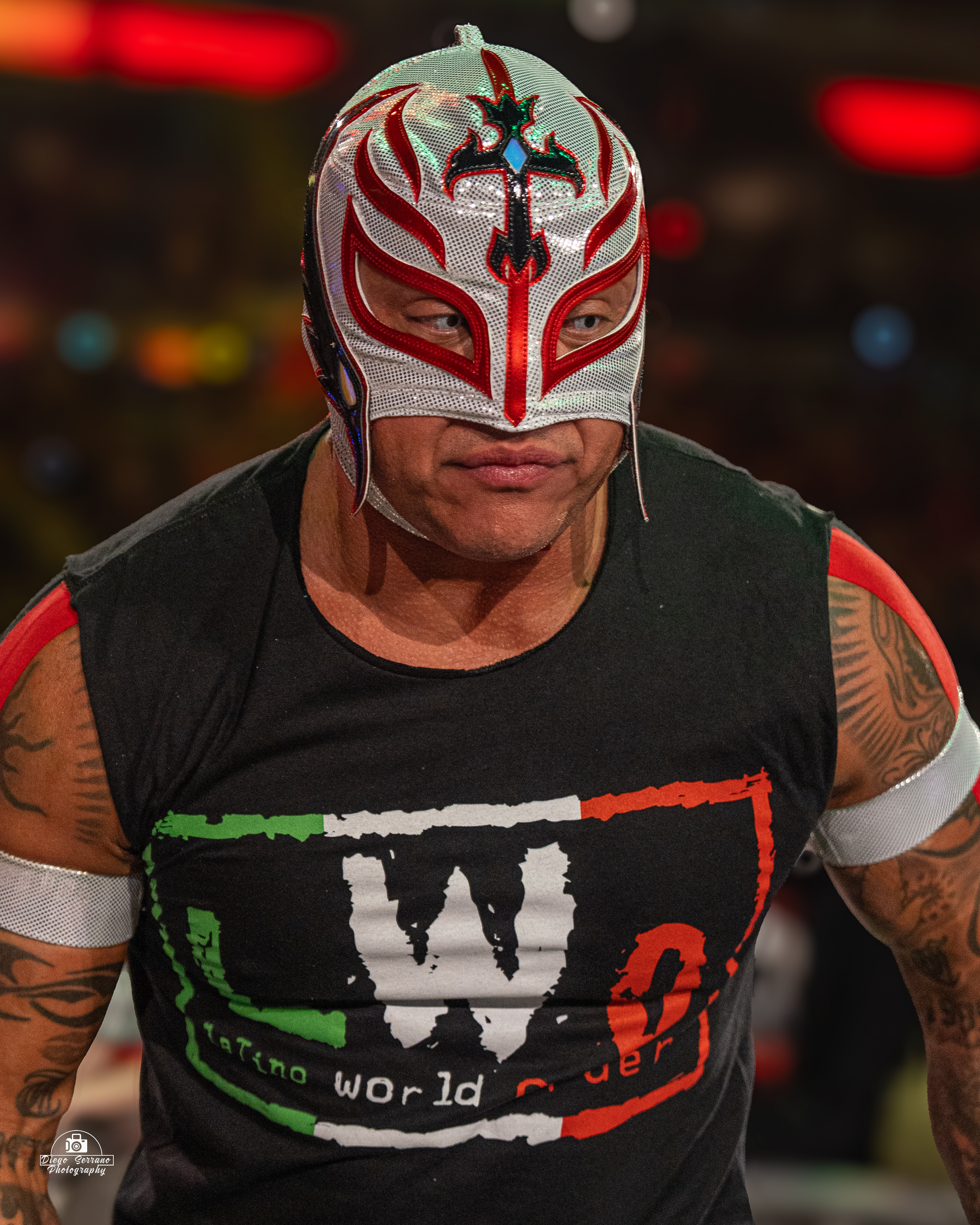
Mysterio in February 2025

After a three-month hiatus, Mysterio returned on the March 1 episode of SmackDown, assisting Carlito in winning a street fight against Escobar. Three weeks later, Mysterio lost to Escobar after interference from Dominik. On the March 29 episode of SmackDown, Mysterio introduced Dragon Lee as the newest member of the LWO, and Rey and Lee challenged Escobar and Dominik to a tag team match at WrestleMania XL. However, Lee was found attacked backstage the following week, rendering him unable to compete at WrestleMania. Rey was assisted by Andrade to fend off Escobar and Dominik. At Night 1 of WrestleMania XL on April 6, Mysterio and Andrade defeated Escobar and Dominik after interference from Lane Johnson and Jason Kelce. On the April 26 episode of SmackDown, after Rey and Lee defeated Los Lotharios (Angel and Berto), Escobar revealed that Carlito had attacked Lee. Carlito then proceeded to attack both Lee and Mysterio after Escobar's revelation. As part of the 2024 WWE Draft, Mysterio and the rest of the LWO were drafted to the Raw brand.

In October 2024, the LWO began a televised feud with Chad Gable's newly formed faction, American Made. The rivalry was centered around Gable's portrayal of "El Grande Americano", a masked character parodying lucha libre traditions, directly opposing Rey Mysterio and the LWO's cultural legacy. The two groups competed in various tag team and mixed-tag matches throughout late 2024 and early 2025. The storyline culminated at WrestleMania 41, where Gable (as El Grande Americano) was scheduled to face Mysterio. However, on the April 19, 2025, episode of SmackDown, Mysterio suffered a legitimate torn groin and a ruptured eardrum during a six-man tag match involving American Made and the LWO. As a result, he was medically disqualified from competing and was replaced by Rey Fénix. Mysterio later underwent surgery and was expected to return to action towards the end of 2025.

On June 7, 2025, he appeared at WWE X AAA Worlds Collide, giving a speech to open the show. On August 16, 2025, Mysterio appeared at Triplemanía XXXIII, to induct Konnan into the AAA Hall of Fame. Mysterio returned to action for the first time in over half a year on the November 17, 2025, episode of Monday Night Raw where he teamed with Sheamus and John Cena to defeat The Judgment Day.

On January 15, 2026, he appeared to open the episode to mark the beginning of the weekly show moving to Fox and YouTube before joining as an English commentator and Spanish-English interpreter for subsequent pre-recorded episodes up to the January 31 episode, when he is actually in Riyadh, Saudi Arabia for Royal Rumble on that day. He entered the match at #4, being eliminated by Oba Femi. In March 2026, it was reported that Mysterio had suffered fractured ribs and would be out of action. Mysterio would subsequently return on the April 6, 2026 edition of Raw to announce that he would be a participant in the WrestleMania 42 Intercontinental Championship ladder match. At the event on Night 2 April 19, Mysterio failed to win the title.

==== Return to AAA (2026–present) ====
On the May 23 episode of Lucha Libre AAA, Mysterio was announced as the new general manager of AAA. Mysterio suspended Omos indefinitely for attacking him on the August 22 episode of AAA. Omos returned on August 30 at Ola de Calor as a paying spectator and was attacked by Rey who challenged him to a match at Night One of Triplemanía 34 on September 11, with the stipulation that Omos could wrestle again in AAA if he won, but would be fired if he lost. Omos won the match with the help of Dominik and was reinstated. Dominik however lost the AAA Mega Championship to El Grande Americano at Night Two of Triplemanía 34 the following day despite an interference by Omos, with Rey counting the pin after the refree was injured.

Dominik and Omos defeated Rey and Americano in a tag team match on the October 3 episode of AAA, earning Dominik the chance to challenge Americano for the AAA Mega Championship at Night One of Héroes Inmortales on October 24. Americano however defeated Dominik with an assist from Rey. Mysterio was indefintely suspended as general manager on November 7 at Night Three of Héroes Inmortales by AAA's CEO Dorian Roldán, being accused of causing AAA wrestlers to work in unsafe conditions in the US which led to their injuries (namely El Hijo del Vikingo and Mini Vikingo), striking Omos who was a paying fan, being biased by helping Americano defeat Dominik for the AAA Mega Championship, and having an extramarital affair with his mother and AAA President Marisela Peña.

== Professional wrestling persona ==
=== Character and in ring style ===
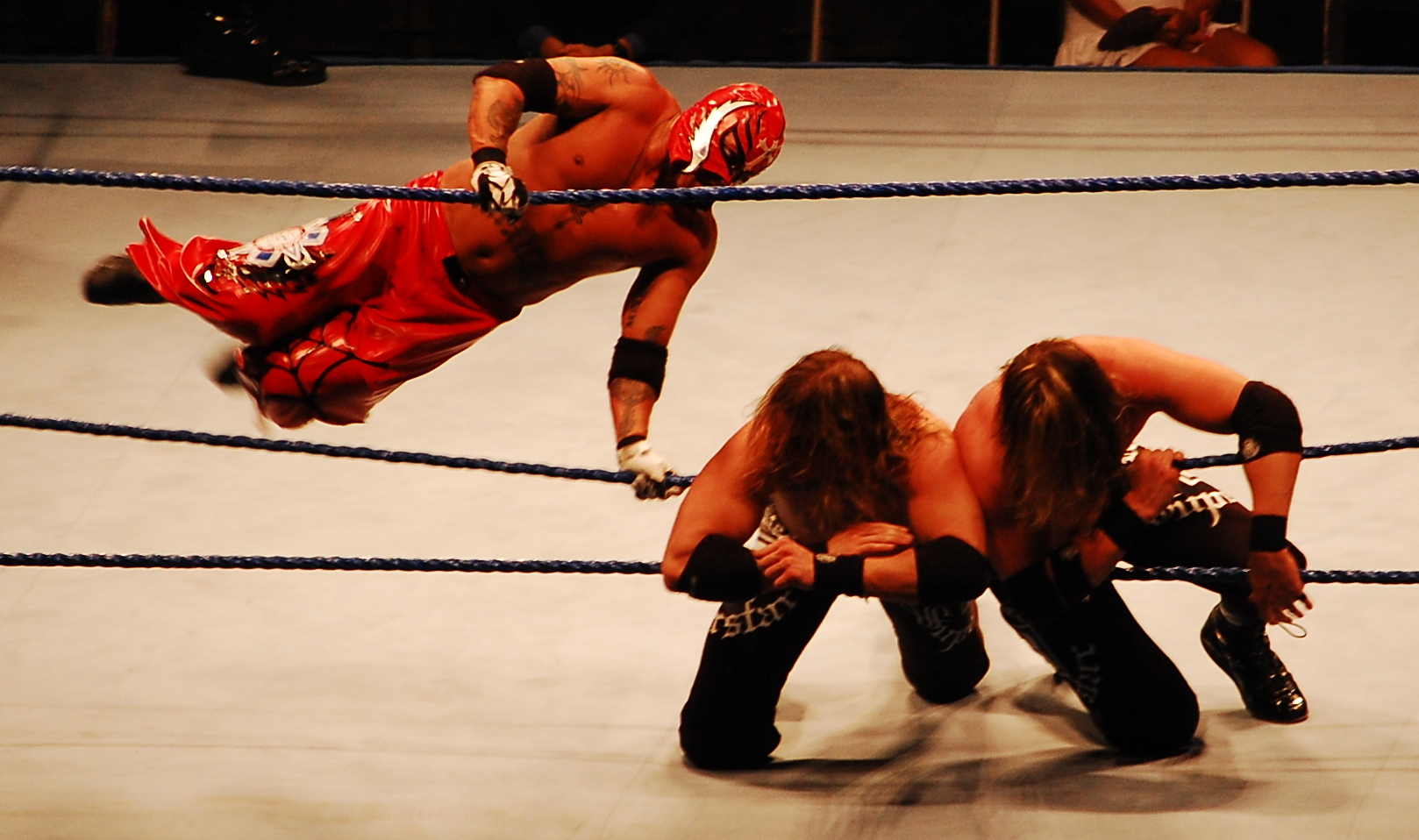
Mysterio (left) hitting a double 619

With Mysterio being relatively short for a professional wrestler, it has led to him being portrayed as an heroic underdog throughout most of his career. WWE announcer Michael Cole commonly referred to him as "the biggest little man in all of WWE". Mysterio has been a babyface for almost the entirety of his career, besides a brief period in during his time in World Championship Wrestling when he was part of the Filthy Animals stable. This also coincided with the only period of his career where he wrestled without a mask before he joined WWE in 2002. Mysterio was not a fan of the unmasking, however he went along with it due to pressure. The word "Booyaka" is often associated with Mysterio as it appears prominently in his theme song. Mysterio has claimed the word is a way of saying Bam. In the ring he is known for high-flying style and his signature move is the 619 where he puts his opponent between the ropes and swings through connecting with his feet, it is then usually followed up with a splash off the top rope. The move was inspired by Súper Astro Jr., a fellow Mexican wrestler he had been a fan of growing up.

=== Fashion ===
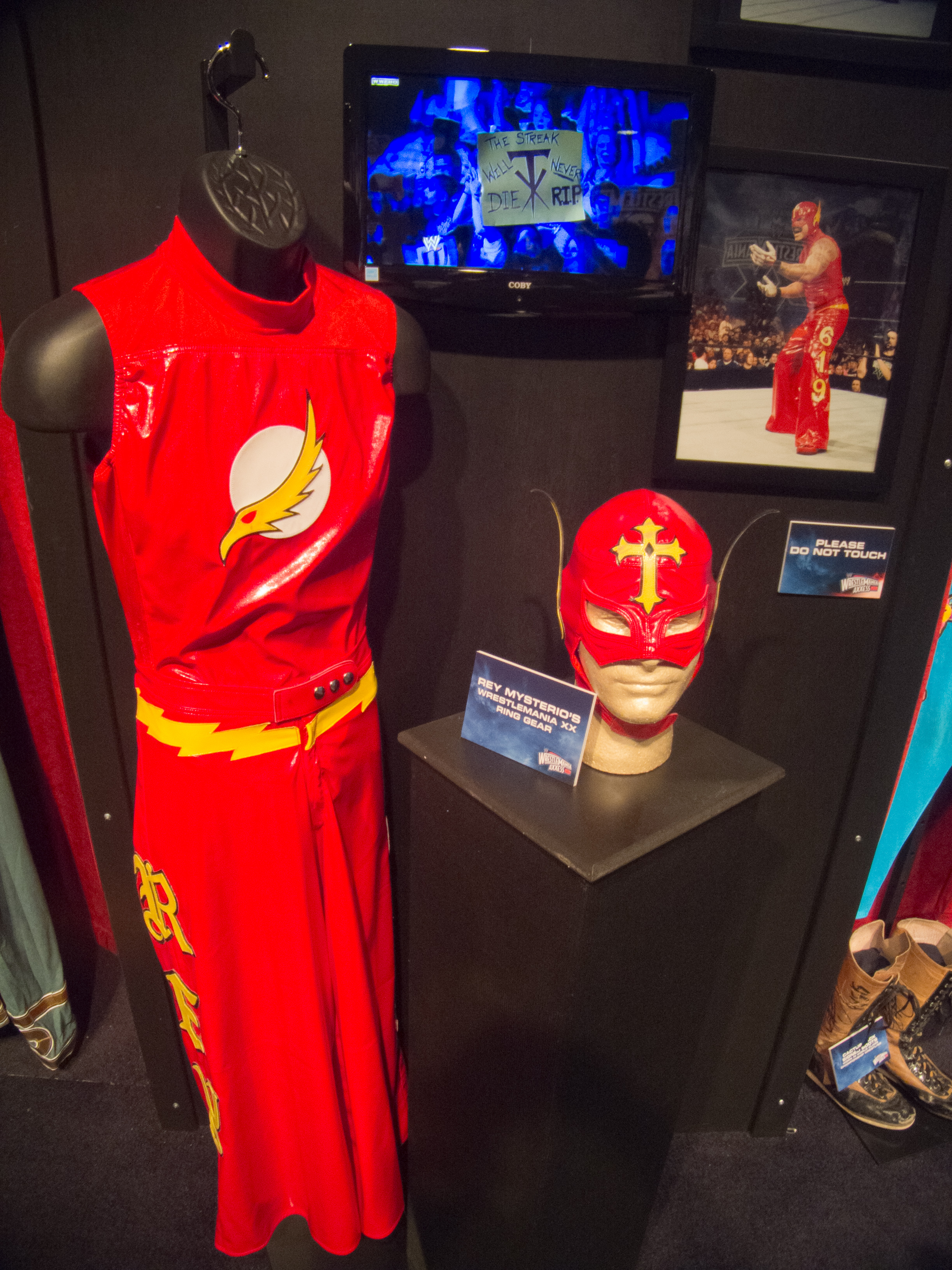
Mysterio's Flash-inspired gear

Mysterio is a traditional luchador; his ring name comes from his uncle and trainer Miguel Ángel López Díaz who wrestled under the name Rey Misterio. As in traditional lucha fashion Mysterio wears his trademark mask which has become an iconic part of his persona and in popular culture as a whole. He is known to wear different attire in every match and reportedly owns over 1,000 masks which he has worn throughout his career. Mysterio's other gear usually consists of colorful pants, gloves, boots and either a sleeveless shirt or singlet although he has wrestled shirtless as well. Mysterio has also been known to make references to comic book characters, wearing the attire of Batman, The Flash, Wolverine, and others.

=== Legacy ===
Mysterio is often regarded as both one of the greatest luchadors and cruiserweight wrestlers of all time. He also played a major role in popularizing lucha libre in the U.S. and globally. Bleacher Report has declared him the greatest luchador of all time praising his selling, good charisma, and move-set. Additionally Kurt Angle dubbed Mysterio the best Luchador in history stating "Rey Mysterio is a high flyer, he's a luchador. He's the best luchador in the history of the business. So he's exceptional at what he does. Wrestling a guy, a regular wrestler, who's a ground-worker, you're not going to have any high-flying technique. So Rey is special, and he does it better than anybody else, he's the absolute best at high-flying."

Another part of his legacy is that he did not let his stature get in his way and became the shortest wrestler to ever hold the WWE Championship. Fellow professional wrestler Adam Copeland stated that Mysterio success proved that "smaller talent" can be main-event stars, adding that "he gets credit but it's still not the credit he deserves. It really isn't. I think because he's been so consistent for so long, that he's not being appreciated to his full extent." Bret Hart has also proclaimed Mysterio as one of the greatest of all time adding "He's really special, nobody can do what Rey Mysterio does." Mysterio has influenced multiple generations of wrestlers such as Cody Rhodes, Lita, Bayley and Penta.

In 2011 Bleacher Report included Mysterio on their list of the 100 greatest wrestlers stating "Mysterio was a proven commodity when he came to WCW and was a cruiserweight champion in that promotion. Along with dubbing him "The smallest giant in all of wrestling". Luke Winkie of Sports Illustrated listed him as the 35th greatest wrestler of all time in 2016, noting that: "Whether Mysterio was working in AAA, or underground ECW shows, or jobbing around WCW, or during his late-career championship reigns in WWE, he's always been a joy to watch."

Scott Feldstead of Muscle and Fittness Magazine wrote "Mysterio became an undeniable champion because he's relatable as an underdog, but he's also been one of the consistently hardest workers in the mat game. "Rey Rey's" enduring popularity has re-written the formula of wrestling bosses booking their winners and losers based on size. And, after talking to his peers here in Hollywood, there's no shortage of love for him in the WWE locker room."

== Other media ==
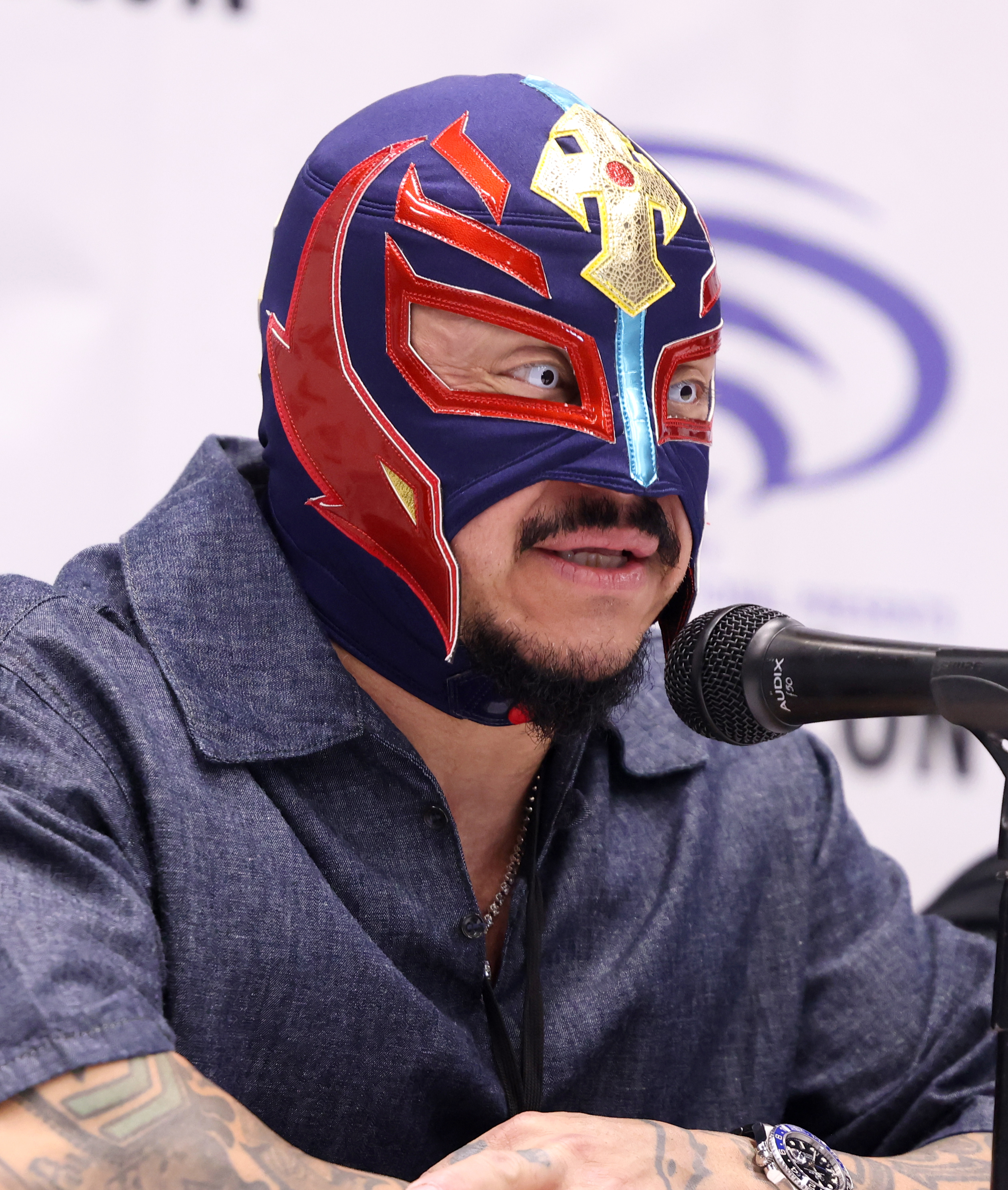
Mysterio at the 2026 WonderCon

Mysterio has been a subject of several DVDs during his wrestling career, including Rey Mysterio: 619, a 2003 documentary of Mysterio's career and personal life. WWE also produced Rey Mysterio: The Biggest Little Man, a three disc set featuring Mysterio's best matches that was released on October 23, 2007. He was also featured on the DVD Before They Were Wrestling Stars: Rey Mysterio Jr. in 2007 which featured matches from his time in Mexico. Rey Mysterio: The Life of a Masked Man was issued on July 12, 2011. In the UK, Silver Vision released a Mysterio DVD as part of their Best of WWE collection. This featured his matches from SummerSlam 2005, WrestleMania 22, No Mercy 2006, and SummerSlam 2007. In 2021 Mysterio made a cameo appearance is the showVictor & Valentino, in the episode El Bigote. Mysterio voices himself in the 2023 animated series Rey Mysterio vs. The Darkness. The show airs on Cartoon Network Latin America and consists of a single season with ten episodes.

=== Movies ===
Mysterio appeared in the 2000 film Ready to Rumble along with several other wrestlers.

=== Books ===
- Mysterio, Rey; Roberts, Jeremy (November 10, 2009). Rey Mysterio: Behind the Mask. New York City: WWE Books (Pocket Books). 368pp. ISBN 978-1-4391-9584-0.

=== Music ===
Mysterio, along with rapper Mad One, performed the original version of "Booyaka 619", which Mysterio used as his WWE entrance theme around September 2005. Mysterio also performed a rap song, called "Crossing Borders", which appears on the 2004 album WWE Originals and was also used as the official theme song for the 2004 No Way Out pay-per-view.

== Filmography ==
=== Film ===
Film
| Year | Title | Role | Notes |
|---|---|---|---|
| 2000 | Ready to Rumble | Himself | Uncredited cameo |
| 2015 | The Flintstones & WWE: Stone Age SmackDown! | Rey Mysteriopal | Voice role |

=== Television ===
Television
| Year | Title | Role | Notes |
|---|---|---|---|
| 2007 | Heroes | Himself | Archival footage Episode: "The Kindness of Strangers" |
| 2021 | Victor & Valentino | Himself (voice) | 1 episode (cameo) |
| 2021–present | Booyaka! Rey Mysterio vs. The Darkness | Himself (voice) | |
| 2022 | Celebrity Family Feud | Himself (contestant) | He and his family won $25,000 for Make a Wish America |

== Video games ==
WCW video games
| Year | Title | Notes |
|---|---|---|
| 1997 | WCW vs. nWo: World Tour | Video game debut |
| 1998 | WCW Nitro | |
| 1998 | WCW/nWo Revenge | |
| 1999 | WCW/nWo Thunder | |
| 1999 | WCW Mayhem | |
| 2000 | WCW Backstage Assault | |

WWE video games
| Year | Title | Notes |
|---|---|---|
| 2003 | WWE WrestleMania XIX | WWE video game debut |
| 2003 | WWE Raw 2 | |
| 2003 | WWE SmackDown! Here Comes The Pain | Cover athlete (NTSC version) |
| 2004 | WWE Day of Reckoning | |
| 2004 | WWE Survivor Series | Cover athlete |
| 2004 | WWE SmackDown! vs. Raw | |
| 2005 | WWE WrestleMania 21 | |
| 2005 | WWE Day of Reckoning 2 | |
| 2005 | WWE SmackDown! vs. Raw 2006 | |
| 2006 | WWE SmackDown vs. Raw 2007 | Cover athlete (NTSC version) |
| 2007 | WWE SmackDown vs. Raw 2008 | |
| 2008 | WWE SmackDown vs. Raw 2009 | |
| 2009 | WWE SmackDown vs. Raw 2010 | Cover athlete |
| 2010 | WWE SmackDown vs. Raw 2011 | |
| 2011 | WWE All Stars | Cover athlete |
| 2011 | WWE '12 | |
| 2012 | WWE '13 | |
| 2013 | WWE 2K14 | |
| 2014 | WWE 2K15 | |
| 2018 | WWE 2K19 | As pre-order bonus |
| 2019 | WWE 2K20 | |
| 2020 | WWE 2K Battlegrounds | |
| 2022 | WWE 2K22 | Cover athlete |
| 2023 | WWE 2K23 | |
| 2024 | WWE 2K24 | |
| 2025 | WWE 2K25 | |
| 2026 | WWE 2K26 | |

Other
| Year | Title | Notes |
|---|---|---|
| 2024 | Call of Duty: Modern Warfare III | |

== Personal life ==
Gutiérrez is of Mexican descent. He and his wife, Angie, have two children: a son, Dominik, and a daughter, Aalyah. He has tattoos of his children's names on his right and left biceps, tattoos dedicated to his wife, and a tattoo with the initials "EG" for his best friend and fellow wrestler, Eddie Guerrero, who died in 2005. Gutiérrez is part of an extended family of wrestlers, including his son Dominik, uncle Rey Misterio, and his cousins El Hijo de Rey Misterio and Metalika. In 2026, Gutiérrez announced that Aalyah had begun her professional wrestling training, but is listed under her real last name. That September, Aalyah signed with WWE to begin her training at the WWE Performance Center.

On March 19, 2007, Sports Illustrated published an article in its continuing series investigating a steroid and HGH ring used by a number of professional athletes in several sports. That article mentioned several current and former WWE wrestlers, including Gutierrez who was alleged to have obtained nandrolone and stanozolol. WWE subsequently stated that the allegations preceded the Talent Wellness program WWE launched in February 2006. On August 27, 2009, WWE announced that Gutierrez would receive a 30-day suspension due to a violation of the wellness program. Days later, Gutierrez defended himself in a newspaper interview by explaining the drugs as being on a prescription for his knee and arm. While the Wellness Policy allows for prescribed drugs, Gutierrez further contested he had been on a family holiday and subsequently in Europe promoting SummerSlam, giving him only a day to provide the prescription after being notified. On April 26, 2012, WWE suspended Gutierrez for 60 days due to a second violation of their wellness program.

Gutiérrez and his wrestling gear were credited as one of the inspirations for the 2014 Mexican National football team's jerseys for that year's World Cup.

In 2018 the city of San Diego honored Gutiérrez by naming June 19 Rey Mysterio day. The day was picked in homage to his signature move the 619. He along with his son Dominik were later given the key to the city by Mayor Todd Gloria in 2025.

Gutiérrez is known to have an extensive sword collection, including a prop sword from the 2002 film The Scorpion King.

In 2019, Gutiérrez criticized President Donald Trump's plan to build a wall along the US-Mexico border, saying Trump was "definitely not helping" and "a wall is definitely not the solution"; he spent his childhood crossing the border from Mexico to the United States each day for school.

He is a fervent Catholic, frequently crossing himself before his matches and bearing numerous religious tattoos on his body, most notably a cross on his chest attached to rosaries, crosses on his mask, as well as other crosses and allusions to God.

Gutiérrez is a fan of California-based sports teams such as the Los Angeles Chargers and San Diego Padres. In September 2023 Gutiérrez threw out the ceremonial first pitch at a San Diego Padres game.

Gutiérrez has been involved in numerous charitable acts throughout his career most notably with make a wish. In December 2024 he granted his 100th wish for the organization. In 2019, he started a fundraiser called "Fight4Autism" to raise money to support autistic people around the world.

Gutiérrez is an avid fan of the UFC attending numerous events throughout the year. At UFC 306 he gifted Dana White one of his masks that was UFC 306 themed.

In 2025 Gutiérrez was honored at the National Hispanic Media Coalition's Impact Awards Gala. He was awarded the Legend Impact Award for his "groundbreaking impact in sports entertainment and representation spanning across generations."

== Championships and accomplishments ==
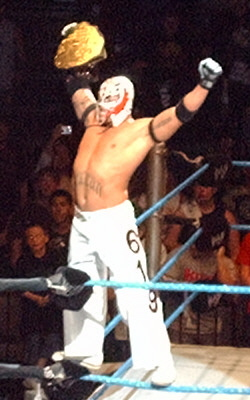
Mysterio is a two-time World Heavyweight Champion (among three overall world titles in WWE).

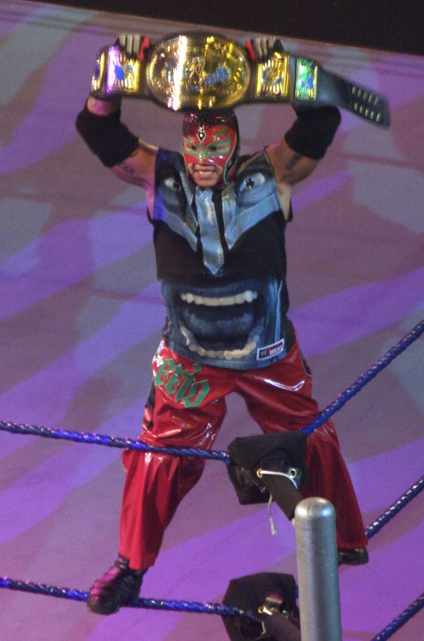
Mysterio is a two-time WWE Intercontinental Champion.

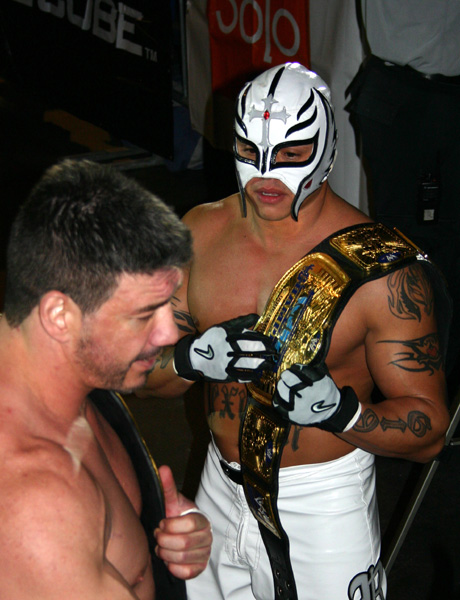
Mysterio is a four-time WWE Tag Team Champion (shown here during his reign with Eddie Guerrero).

- Asistencia Asesoría y Administración / Lucha Libre AAA Worldwide / World Wrestling Association
  - Mexican National Trios Championship (1 time) – with Octagón and Super Muñeco
  - Mexican National Welterweight Championship (1 time)
  - WWA Lightweight Championship (3 times)
  - WWA Tag Team Championship (1 time) – with Rey Misterio
  - WWA Welterweight Championship (3 times)
  - Lucha Libre World Cup (2015) – with Myzteziz and Alberto El Patrón
  - AAA Hall of Fame (Class of 2007)
  - Técnico of the Year (2015)
- Catch Wrestling Europe
  - CWE World Grand Prix (2017)
- Cauliflower Alley Club
  - Lucha Libre Award (2020)
- The Crash
  - The Crash Heavyweight Championship (1 time)
- DDT Pro-Wrestling
  - Ironman Heavymetalweight Championship (1 time)
- Destiny World Wrestling
  - DWW Championship (1 time)
- Hollywood Heavyweight Wrestling
  - HHW Light Heavyweight Championship (1 time)
- International Wrestling All-Stars
  - IWAS Tag Team Championship (1 time) – with Konnan
- Lucha Underground
  - Lucha Underground Trios Championship (1 time) – with Dragon Azteca Jr. and Prince Puma
- National Hispanic Media Coalition's Impact Awards
  - Legend Impact Award (2025)
- Pro Wrestling Illustrated
  - Ranked No. 4 of the top 500 best singles wrestlers in the PWI 500 in 1999
  - Ranked No. 56 of the top 500 singles wrestlers of the "PWI Years" in 2003
- World Championship Wrestling
  - WCW Cruiserweight Championship (5 times)
  - WCW Cruiserweight Tag Team Championship (1 time, final) – with Billy Kidman
  - WCW World Tag Team Championship (3 times) – with Billy Kidman (1), Konnan (1), and Juventud Guerrera (1)
- World Wrestling Council
  - WWC World Junior Heavyweight Championship (1 time)
- World Wrestling Entertainment / WWE
  - WWE Championship (1 time)
  - World Heavyweight Championship (2 times)
  - WWE Intercontinental Championship (2 times)
  - WWE United States Championship (3 times)
  - WWE Cruiserweight Championship (3 times)
  - WWE Tag Team Championship (4 times) – with Edge (1), Rob Van Dam (1), Eddie Guerrero (1), and Batista (1)
  - WWE SmackDown Tag Team Championship (1 time) – with Dominik Mysterio
  - Royal Rumble (2006)
  - WWE Hall of Fame (Class of 2023)
  - Championship Competition Tournament (2007)
  - Bragging Rights Trophy (2010) – with Team SmackDown (Big Show, Jack Swagger, Alberto Del Rio, Edge, Tyler Reks and Kofi Kingston)
  - WWE Championship Tournament (2011)
  - 21st Triple Crown Champion
  - 21st Grand Slam Champion
  - Bumpy Award (1 time)
    - Tag Team of the Half-Year (2021) - with Dominik Mysterio
- Wrestling Observer Newsletter
  - Best Flying Wrestler (1995–1997, 2002–2004)
  - Best Wrestling Maneuver (1995) Flip dive into a frankensteiner on the floor
  - Match of the Year (2002) with Edge vs. Chris Benoit and Kurt Angle, for the WWE Tag Team Championship, WWE No Mercy, October 20
  - Most Outstanding Wrestler (1996)
  - Rookie of the Year (1992)
  - Worst Feud of the Year (2008) with Kane
  - Wrestling Observer Newsletter Hall of Fame (Class of 2010)

== Luchas de Apuestas record ==
| Winner (wager) | Loser (wager) | Location | Event | Date | Notes |
|---|---|---|---|---|---|
| Colibri (mask) | El Salvaje (hair) | Tijuana, Baja California | Live event | 1991 | (Note: This was a tag team match where El Salvaje was teamed with Caballero de la Muerte. It is not known who Colibri's partner was.) |
| Rey Misterio Jr. (mask) | El Junior (mask) | Tijuana, Baja California | Live event | 1992 | (Note: Misterio's opponent, who also wrestled as The King, is not the same wrestler as the more famous Mexican luchador who used "The King" as a ring name.) |
| Rey Misterio Jr. (mask) | Mr. Cóndor (mask) | Acapulco, Guerrero | Live event | August 14, 1992 | |
| Rey Misterio Jr. (mask) | Rocco Valente (hair) | Tampico, Tamaulipas | Live event | October 18, 1992 | |
| Rey Misterio Jr. (mask) | Tony Arce (hair) | Acapulco, Guerrero | Live event | November 6, 1992 | |
| Rey Misterio Jr. (mask) | Bandido (mask) | Querétaro City, Querétaro | Live event | May 28, 1993 | (Note: This was a three-way match that also involved Ángel Mortal. The wrestler that Misterio defeated during this three-way match is not the same wrestler who began performing as Bandido from 2016.) |
| Rey Misterio Jr. (mask) | Vulcano (hair) | Monterrey, Nuevo León | Live event | September 11, 1993 | |
| Rey Misterio Jr. (mask) | Misterioso (mask) | Tijuana, Baja California | Live event | December 19, 1996 | |
| Rey Misterio Jr. (mask) | Eddie Guerrero (championship) | Las Vegas, Nevada | Halloween Havoc | October 26, 1997 | |
| Kevin Nash and Scott Hall (hair) (Note: Manager Elizabeth's hair.) | Rey Misterio Jr. (mask) and Konnan | Oakland, California | SuperBrawl IX | February 21, 1999 | |
| Rey Mysterio (mask) | Kane | Portland, Oregon | No Mercy | October 5, 2008 | (Note: Kane did not wager anything during this match.) |
| Rey Mysterio (mask) | Chris Jericho (championship) | Sacramento, California | The Bash | June 28, 2009 | |
| Rey Mysterio (stable pledge) | CM Punk (hair) | Detroit, Michigan | Over the Limit | May 23, 2010 | |
