= Rey Misterio =

Mexican professional wrestler and trainer (1958–2024)

- Misterio in the Mid-1980s

Personal information
- Born: Miguel Ángel López Días; January 8, 1958 Tijuana, Baja California, Mexico
- Died: December 20, 2024 (aged 66)
- Family: El Hijo de Rey Misterio (son); Rey Mysterio (Jr.) (nephew); Dominik Mysterio (grand nephew)

Professional wrestling career
- Ring name(s): Bull Rider; El Genio; Rayman; Maravilla Blanca; Rey Misterio; Rey Misterio Sr.
- Billed height: 1.75 m (5 ft 9 in)
- Billed weight: 98 kg (216 lb)
- Trained by: Atila; Chamaco Martínez; El Egipcio; El Enfermero; Enrique Torres; El Faraón; El Solitario
- Debut: January 6, 1972

Miguel Ángel López Días (January 8, 1958 – December 20, 2024) was a Mexican professional wrestler and trainer, better known by his ring name, Rey Misterio ("Mystery King"). He was also referred to as Rey Misterio Sr. to distinguish him from his nephew, who initially wrestled as Rey Misterio Jr., but has for the latter part of his career been billed as Rey Mysterio.

== Professional wrestling career ==
Misterio first began training to be a boxer, but after his body got bigger, he took a lot of bumps and lost some of his punching ability. When his trainers told him that he could not still punch hard, they told Misterio about wrestling. His brother soon began to take him to train for professional wrestling. On the sixth of January 1976, Misterio finally made his debut as a wrestler on a show called "Day of the Kings", or Día de los Reyes.

Misterio appeared at World Championship Wrestling's Starrcade 1990 pay-per-view event where he teamed with Konnan and competed in the "Pat O'Connor Memorial International Cup" representing Mexico. In the first round the team defeated Chris Adams and Norman Smiley representing the United Kingdom, but lost to The Steiner Brothers in the second round.

=== Training ===
In 1987, Misterio opened a gym with Negro Casas and Super Astro. His first class included future international superstars such as Konnan, Psicosis, Halloween, Damián 666 and his nephew Rey Mysterio. Misterio is also known to have trained wrestlers such as Cassandro, Hayabusa, Extassis, Tigre Uno, Fobia, Misterioso, Demus 3:16, Ruby Gardenia, The Warlord, and Venum Black.

== Personal life and death ==
Misterio's son is also a wrestler, who appears under the name El Hijo de Rey Misterio.

Misterio was also uncle to wrestlers Rey Mysterio (who originally wrestled as Rey Misterio Jr.) and Metalika, grand uncle to Dominik Mysterio, and brother-in-law to Super Astro.

He is featured in the horror film El Mascarado Massacre (or Wrestlemaniac).

Rey Misterio died on December 20, 2024, at the age of 66, 19 days before his 67th birthday.

== Championships and accomplishments ==
- Asistencia Asesoría y Administración
  - IWC World Middleweight Championship (2 times)
- Pro Wrestling Illustrated
  - PWI ranked him #373 of the 500 best singles wrestlers during the PWI Years in 2003
  - PWI ranked him #212 of the 500 best singles wrestlers of the PWI 500 in 2004
- Pro Wrestling Revolution
  - Revolution Tag Team Championship (1 time)- with El Hijo de Rey Misterio
- Tijuana Wrestling
  - America's Championship (1 time)
  - Baja California Middleweight Championship (1 time)
  - IWC Television Championship (1 time)
  - Tijuana Welterweight Championship
  - Tijuana Tag Team Championship (3 times) – Saeta Oriental (1), Pequeño Apolo / Super Astro (1) and Rey Guerrero (1)
- World Wrestling Association
  - WWA World Junior Light Heavyweight Championship (1 time)
  - WWA Tag Team Championship (1 time) – with Rey Mysterio Jr.
- World Wrestling Organization
  - WWO World Championship (1 time)
- Xtreme Latin American Wrestling
  - XLAW Extreme Championship (2 times)
- Other accomplishments
  - Tijuana Sports Hall of Fame (Class of 2006)

== Luchas de Apuestas record ==
| Winner (wager) | Loser (wager) | Location | Event | Date | Notes |
|---|---|---|---|---|---|
| Rey Misterio (mask) | Zorro de Oro (mask) | Tijuana, Baja California | Live event | N/A | |
| Rey Misterio (mask) | Angel Azul (mask) | Tijuana, Baja California | Live event | N/A | |
| Rey Misterio (mask) | Tornado Negro (mask) | Tijuana, Baja California | Live event | N/A | |
| Rey Misterio (mask) | Monje Negro (mask) | Tijuana, Baja California | Live event | N/A | |
| Rey Misterio (mask) | Rambo Star (mask) | Tijuana, Baja California | Live event | N/A | |
| Rey Misterio (mask) | Destroyer (mask) | Tijuana, Baja California | Live event | N/A | |
| Rey Misterio (mask) | Delfin (mask) | Tijuana, Baja California | Live event | N/A | |
| Rey Misterio (mask) | Angel de Plata (mask) | Tijuana, Baja California | Live event | N/A | |
| Rey Misterio (mask) | Fraile del Mal (mask) | Tijuana, Baja California | Live event | N/A | |
| Rey Misterio (mask) | Estrella Azul (mask) | Tijuana, Baja California | Live event | N/A | |
| Rey Misterio (mask) | Caballero Rojo (mask) | Tijuana, Baja California | Live event | N/A | |
| Rey Misterio (mask) | Diamante Negro (mask) | Tijuana, Baja California | Live event | N/A | |
| Rey Misterio (mask) | Infernal (mask) | Tijuana, Baja California | Live event | N/A | |
| Rey Misterio (mask) | El Siberiano (hair) | Tijuana, Baja California | Live event | N/A | |
| Rey Misterio (mask) | Estudiante (hair) | Tijuana, Baja California | Live event | N/A | |
| Rey Misterio (mask) | MS-1 (hair) | Tijuana, Baja California | Live event | N/A | |
| Fishman (mask) | Rey Misterio (mask) | Tijuana, Baja California | Live event | March 25, 1988 | |
| Rey Misterio (hair) | Lobo Rubio (hair) | Tijuana, Baja California | Live event | October, 1988 | |
| Rey Misterio (hair) | Huichol (hair) | Tijuana, Baja California | Live event | October 27, 1994 | |
| Rey Misterio (hair) | Psicosis (mask) | Tijuana, Baja California | Live event | August 26, 1999 | |
| Nicho el Millonario (hair) | Rey Misterio (hair) | Tijuana, Baja California | Live event | May 12, 2000 | |
| Rey Misterio (hair) | Salsero (hair) | Tijuana, Baja California | Live event | December 13, 2002 | (Note: Last two men in an eight-man Steel cage match.) |
| Rey Misterio (hair) | Kiss (hair) | Tijuana, Baja California | Live event | February 28, 2003 | |
| Dr. Wagner Jr. (mask) | Rey Misterio (hair) | Tijuana, Baja California | Live event | November 14, 2003 | |
| Rey Misterio (hair) | Cien Caras (hair) | Tijuana, Baja California | Live event | August 25, 2006 | |
| Rey Misterio (hair) | Nicho el Millonario (hair) | Tijuana, Baja California | Live event | December 1, 2006 | (Note: Last two men in a Steel cage match that also included El Hijo de Rey Misterio and Super Parka.) |
