= El Hijo de Rey Misterio =

American professional wrestler

Personal information
- Born: Miguel Aaron López Hernández; November 9, 1988 (age 37) San Diego, California, United States
- Family: Rey Misterio (Sr.) (father); Rey Mysterio (Jr.) (cousin); Dominik Mysterio (first cousin once removed)

Professional wrestling career
- Ring name(s): Diablo; El Hijo de Rey Misterio; Nuevo Rey Misterio Jr. Rey Misterio Heredero
- Billed height: 1.60 m (5 ft 3 in)
- Billed weight: 69 kg (152 lb)
- Trained by: Rey Misterio (Sr.); Medico Asesino Jr.
- Debut: April 2006

Miguel Aaron López Hernández (born November 9, 1988) is a Mexican-American professional wrestler, best known under the name El Hijo de Rey Misterio. He is the first-born son of the Mexican professional wrestler Rey Misterio (Sr.) He is also the cousin of Rey Mysterio (Jr.). He currently works for various promotions in Mexico, where he wrestles under the name Rey Misterio Heredero.

His ring name is Spanish for "The Son of the Mystery King".

== Professional wrestling career ==
El Hijo de Rey Misterio grew up in a wrestling family with both his father, Miguel Ángel López Díaz who wrestled as Rey Misterio Sr., and his cousin, Óscar Gutiérrez, better known as Rey Mysterio, being very well known professional wrestlers. At the age of 13 he began training with his father at his wrestling school in Tijuana. He made his professional wrestling debut in 2006, initially working under the ring name Diablo. By the end of 2006 his father gave him permission to use the "Rey Misterio" name and he became "El Hijo de Rey Misterio". The name has led to some confusion, especially when wrestling in the United States where a lot of fans have mistaken him for the son of Rey Mysterio, but Mysterio is actually his cousin. Some promoters have actively sought to exploit this confusion by neglecting to bill him as "El Hijo de" and just billed him as Rey Misterio. In one controversial case a Bolivian promoter used World Wrestling Entertainment footage of Rey Mysterio to promote a tour by El Hijo de Rey Misterio, when Hijo de Rey Misterio found out he cancelled his tour. When El Hijo de Rey Misterio cancelled his tour the Bolivian promoter had someone else wrestle under the mask, pretending to be El Hijo de Rey Misterio.

Since adopting the "Hijo de Rey Misterio" name he has been working mainly for Pro Wrestling Revolution (PWR) in Northern California, shows in Tijuana and made various independent wrestling promotion appearances in the United States. His stint in PWR saw him team with his father on several occasions, the two won a tournament to become the first PWR Tag Team Champions when they defeated the Border Patrol (Oliver John and Nathan Rulez) on May 31, 2008. The duo defended the title a couple of times during 2008 but were forced to vacate the title in June 2009 as Rey Misterio, Sr. suffered a serious injury. He has stated that while he likes working in the United States he really wants to focus on a wrestling career in Mexico, hoping to work for Consejo Mundial de Lucha Libre (CMLL) or Lucha Libre AAA Worldwide (AAA), Mexico's two largest professional wrestling promotions. In October 2009 it was reported that El Hijo de Rey Misterio had been working at CMLL's wrestling school in Mexico City to train for his future CMLL debut. He would, however, never make an appearance for CMLL, before suddenly announcing his retirement from professional wrestling in early 2011. On May 27, 2011, a new El Hijo de Rey Misterio was introduced by Rey Misterio, Sr. and Konnan, making his debut in Tijuana. He now goes by Rey Horus. The original El Hijo de Rey Misterio returned to professional wrestling in November 2011. On December 25, 2011, he defeated Mortiz and Mr. Tempest in a ladder match to win the Baja California Championship, joining Los Perros del Mal in the process.

== Personal life ==
El Hijo de Rey Misterio is part of an extended family of wrestlers, his father Miguel Ángel López Díaz was best known under the ring name Rey Misterio (Sr.), his cousin Oscar & nephew Dominik Gutiérrez work for WWE as Rey Mysterio & Dominik Mysterio. His other cousin is a wrestler known as Metalika and his uncle, Juan Zezatti Ramírez, is better known as Super Astro.

In May 2012 López and his younger brother were arrested in Playas de Rosarito, Baja California, with a kilogram of the drug "ice" in their possession. Both were turned over to the federal authorities for prosecution. While it was not initially reported if López was ever convicted of any crime, López later confirmed in a 2023 interview that he was imprisoned for four years for his involvement in the drug trade.

== Championships and accomplishments ==
- New Tradition Lucha Libre
  - NTLL Tag Team Championship (1 time) - with Halloween JR.
- Pro Wrestling Revolution
  - PWR Tag Team Championship (1 time) - with Rey Misterio, Sr.
- Vendetta Pro Wrestling
  - Vendetta Pro Wrestling Heavyweight Championship (1 time)
- Other titles
  - Baja California Championship (1 time)

== Luchas de Apuestas record ==
| Winner (wager) | Loser (wager) | Location | Event | Date | Notes |
|---|---|---|---|---|---|
| El Hijo de Rey Misterio (mask) | Inferno (mask) | Tijuana, Baja California | Live event | February 23, 2007 | |
| El Hijo de Rey Misterio (mask) | Black Panther (mask) | Tijuana, Baja California | Live event | August 17, 2007 | |
| El Hijo de Rey Misterio (mask) | Kendo Jr. (mask) | Tijuana, Baja California | Live event | October 26, 2007 | |
| E Hijo de Rey Mysterio (mask) | Extreme Tiger (mask) | Tijuana, Baja California | Live Event | November 6, 2026 | |
