= Dominik Mysterio =

American professional wrestler (born 1997)

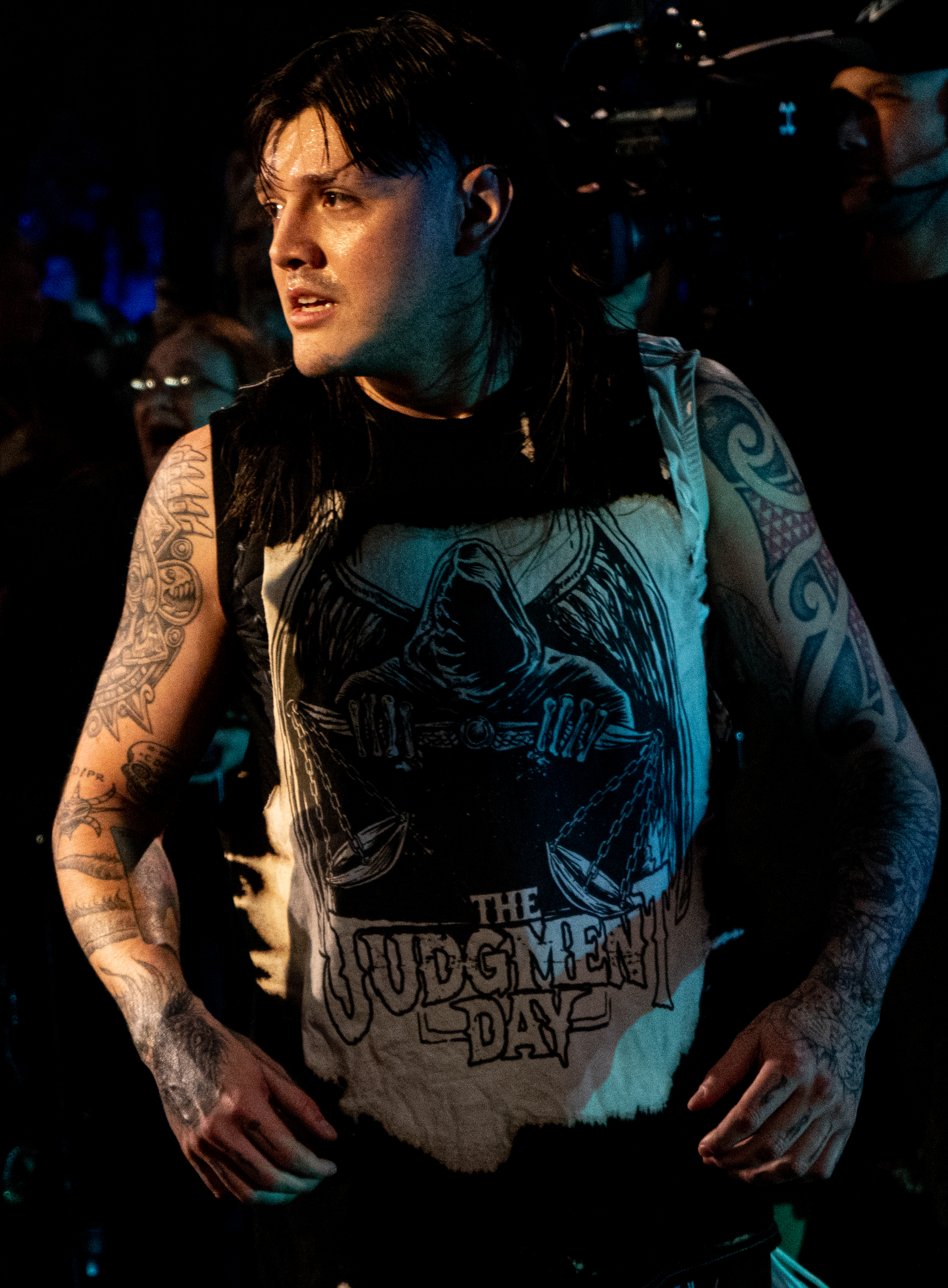
- Mysterio in 2024

Personal information
- Born: Dominik Óscar Gutiérrez; April 5, 1997 (age 29) San Diego, California, U.S.
- Spouse: Marie Juliette (m. 2024)
- Parent: Rey Mysterio (father)
- Relatives: El Hijo de Rey Misterio (first cousin once removed); Rey Misterio Sr. (great uncle); Konnan (godfather)

Professional wrestling career
- Ring name(s): Dominik Mysterio "Dirty" Dominik Mysterio
- Billed height: 6 ft 1 in (185 cm)
- Billed weight: 200 lb (91 kg)
- Billed from: San Diego, California, U.S.
- Trained by: Jay Lethal; Konnan; Lance Storm; Rey Mysterio; WWE Performance Center
- Debut: August 23, 2020

Dominik Óscar Gutiérrez (born April 5, 1997), better known by the ring name Dominik Mysterio, is an American professional wrestler. He is signed to WWE, where he performs on the Raw brand and is a member of The Judgment Day stable. He also appears in WWE's sister promotion Lucha Libre AAA Worldwide (AAA), where he is a member of the El Ojo stable.

The son of Rey Mysterio and great-nephew of Rey Misterio Sr, Gutiérrez first appeared in WWE in 2005, aged 8. He made his in-ring debut in 2020 and has won the WWE Intercontinental Championship and NXT North American Championship twice each. He has won the AAA Mega Championship once, becoming the first wrestler to hold championships in WWE and AAA simultaneously, and the SmackDown Tag Team Championship once (with Rey Mysterio), becoming the first parent-child team to win a championship in WWE.

== Early life ==
Dominik Gutiérrez was born on April 5, 1997. Of Mexican-American heritage, he is the son of Óscar Gutiérrez, better known as Rey Mysterio, and his wife Angie. He has a younger sister, Aalyah Gutiérrez. He graduated from Horizon Christian Academy in San Diego, where he played safety on the school's football team, and attended Southwestern College in Chula Vista for a few semesters.

== Professional wrestling career ==
=== Early appearances ===
Before he became a professional wrestler, Gutiérrez went to WWE events to see his father on several occasions. He was in the audience on the June 5, 2003 edition of SmackDown! in Anaheim, California where his father won the WWE Cruiserweight Championship from Matt Hardy. He celebrated with his father in the ring as the show went off the air.

Gutiérrez had his first storyline in the summer of 2005 as part of a storyline between his father and Eddie Guerrero, in which the two rivals fought for custody of him. During the storyline, Guerrero stated that he was Dominik's biological father. On August 21, Mysterio defeated Guerrero in a ladder match for custody of Dominik at the SummerSlam pay-per-view. He made two more appearances in 2006, first at WrestleMania 22 with Angie and Aalyah watching his father win the World Heavyweight Championship for the first time and second on the September 15 episode of SmackDown! where he watched backstage as his father battled with Mr. Kennedy.

Gutiérrez once again appeared with WWE on the March 12, 2010 episode of SmackDown, this time during the feud between his father and the Straight Edge Society (CM Punk, Luke Gallows, and Serena).

In 2015, Gutiérrez appeared on episodes of Lucha Underground, where he got physically involved in the feud between his father Rey Mysterio Jr. and Johnny Mundo.

=== WWE (2019–present) ===
==== The Mysterios (2019–2022) ====
In 2018, Gutiérrez began training with Jay Lethal and his father to become a professional wrestler. On the March 19, 2019 episode of SmackDown Live, Dominik appeared on the show with his father, Rey Mysterio, who announced that he would be facing Samoa Joe for the WWE United States Championship at WrestleMania 35 on April 7. He once again appeared on Raw from April to June, during the feud between Mysterio and Joe. During the following months, he was involved in his father's storylines and matches, including interfering in Rey's WWE Championship match against Brock Lesnar at Survivor Series on November 24.

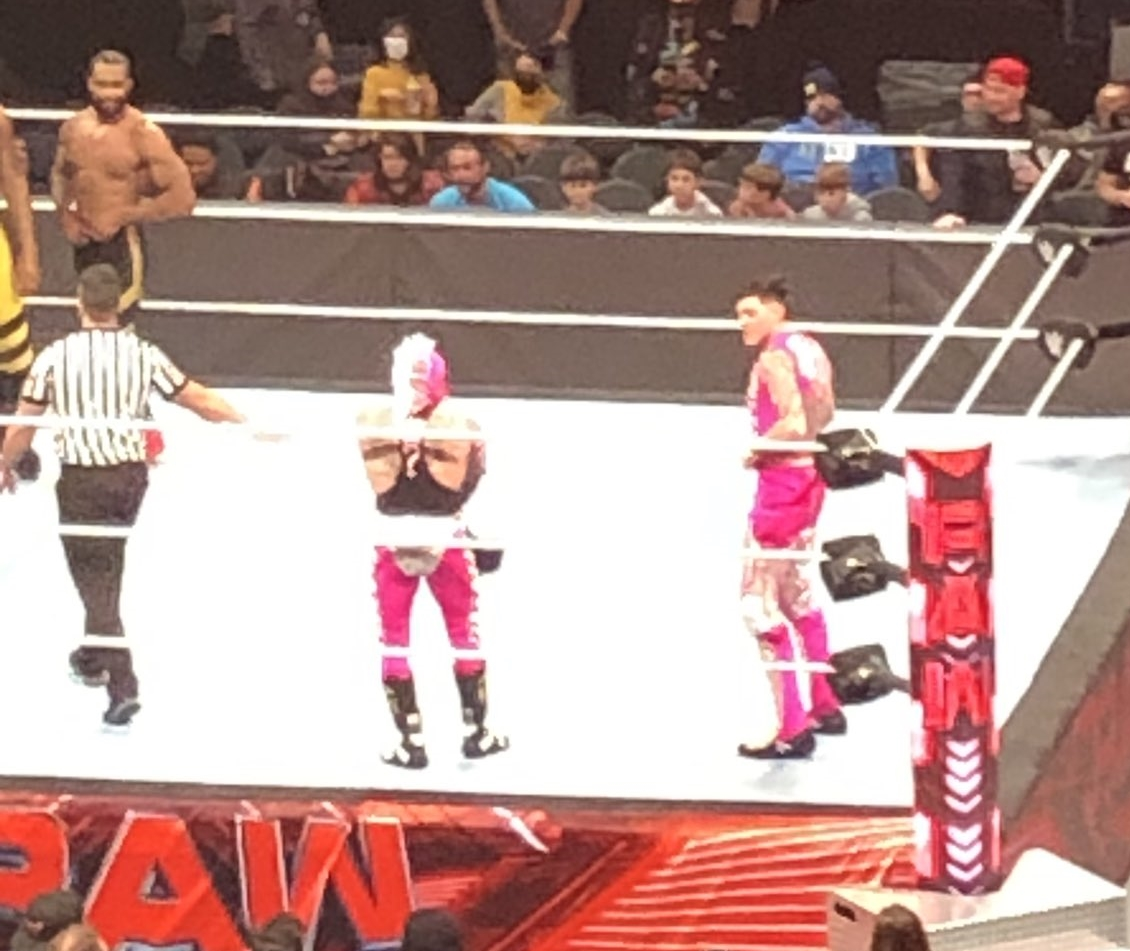
The Mysterios during a tag team match against The Street Profits in December 2021

In May 2020, Rey and Dominik feuded with Seth Rollins and Murphy, leading to Dominik's first match at SummerSlam on August 23, where he lost to Rollins in a Street Fight. At Payback on August 30, Dominik and Rey defeated Rollins and Murphy, earning his first victory in WWE. On the following episode of Raw, Dominik lost to Rollins in a qualifier for the triple threat match for the WWE Championship at Clash of Champions.

As part of the 2020 Draft in October, Dominik was drafted to the SmackDown brand. At Royal Rumble on January 31, 2021, he entered his first Royal Rumble match at number 21, eliminating King Corbin but was eliminated by Bobby Lashley. Following the event, Dominik began teaming with Rey. At WrestleMania Backlash on May 16, they defeated Dolph Ziggler and Robert Roode to win the WWE SmackDown Tag Team Championship, marking Dominik's first championship in WWE and becoming the first father-son tag team champions in WWE history. On the June 4 episode of SmackDown, the Mysterios retained their titles against The Usos, albeit with controversy as the referee failed to notice Jimmy's shoulder was lifted. After Adam Pearce and Sonya Deville granted a rematch later that night, the Mysterios again retained their titles after Roman Reigns interfered and attacked them, causing a disqualification. At the Money in the Bank pre-show on July 18, the Mysterios lost the titles to The Usos, ending their reign at 63 days. They failed to regain the titles at SummerSlam on August 21.

As part of the 2021 Draft, Rey and Dominik were drafted to the Raw brand. In February 2022, they were involved in a feud with The Miz, which grew to involve social media personality Logan Paul, culminating in a tag team match between the Mysterios and Miz and Paul on Night 1 of WrestleMania 38 on April 2, which the Mysterios lost.

==== The Judgment Day (2022–present) ====
In the summer of 2022, the Mysterios began feuding with The Judgment Day (Finn Bálor, Damian Priest and Rhea Ripley) over their attempts to recruit Dominik into the group and betray his father. At SummerSlam on July 30, the Mysterios defeated Bálor and Priest following interference from the returning Edge. After losing an Undisputed WWE Tag Team Championship match on the following episode of Raw, The Judgment Day attacked Dominik and Rey. Edge came out to save them, but accidentally speared Dominik. The following week, Dominik confronted Edge and shoved him. Later that night, during a match between Rey and Bálor, Ripley appeared and laid down a bloody and bruised Dominik, distracting Rey long enough for Bálor to win the match.

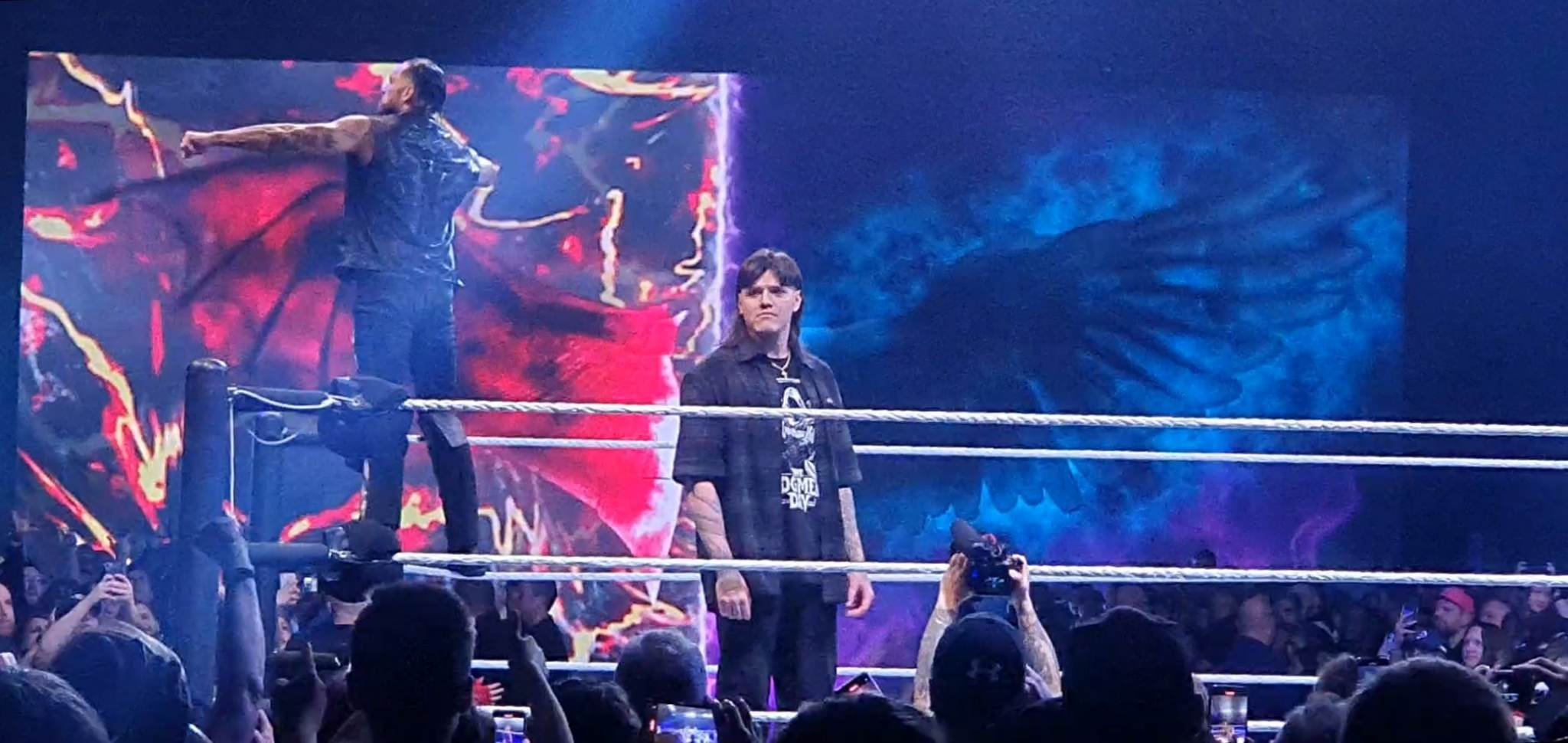
Dominik turned on his father at Clash at the Castle and joined The Judgment Day in September 2022

At Clash at the Castle on September 3, 2022, Dominik accompanied Rey and Edge for their match against Bálor and Priest, which they won. After the match, Dominik hit Edge with a low blow and Rey with a clothesline, turning heel and joining the stable. Dominik took on a gimmick mirroring Eddie Guerrero's Latino Heat while together with Ripley, who called herself Dominik's "Mami". It was eventually tweaked to that of an arrogant youth pretending to be a dangerous former convict. His feud with his father culminated at WrestleMania 39, where Rey defeated Dominik after interference from the newly-reformed Latino World Order (LWO) and Bad Bunny.

In July 2023, he began to work as "Dirty" Dominik Mysterio. On the July 17 episode of Raw, Dominik and Priest failed to win the Undisputed WWE Tag Team Championship from Kevin Owens and Sami Zayn. He also appeared on NXT, where he won the NXT North American Championship twice. At Survivor Series WarGames on November 25, Dominik participated in his first WarGames match alongside The Judgment Day (which now included JD McDonagh) and Drew McIntyre against Rhodes, Jey Uso, Seth "Freakin" Rollins, Zayn and the returning Randy Orton in a losing effort. At WrestleMania XL, Dominik faced his father Rey Mysterio again, this time in a tag team match which included Santos Escobar as Dominik's partner and Andrade as Rey's partner, but they were defeated.

On the April 15, 2024, episode of Raw, Dominik suffered a legitimate elbow injury during a match with Andrade, and was believed to be out of in ring action for “about six to eight weeks”. During this time, he began a storyline with Liv Morgan, having accidentally helped her defeat Becky Lynch for the Women's World Championship at King and Queen of the Ring on May 25. Two nights later on Raw, after accidentally helping her retain the title against Lynch, Morgan kissed Dominik. During the following weeks, as part of her plan to take everything from Ripley, Morgan continuously flirted with Dominik in an attempt to win him over. On the July 8 episode of Raw, Dominik and Morgan defeated Rey and Zelina Vega when Dominik pinned his father. After the match, as he and Morgan were about to kiss, they were interrupted by a returning Ripley. At SummerSlam on August 3, Dominik turned on Ripley when he helped Morgan to retain her title. They lost to Ripley and Priest in a mixed tag team match at Bash in Berlin on August 31. At Bad Blood on October 5, Dominik was suspended above the ring in a shark cage during a title rematch between Morgan and Ripley, where Ripley attacks him as he dangled from the cage.

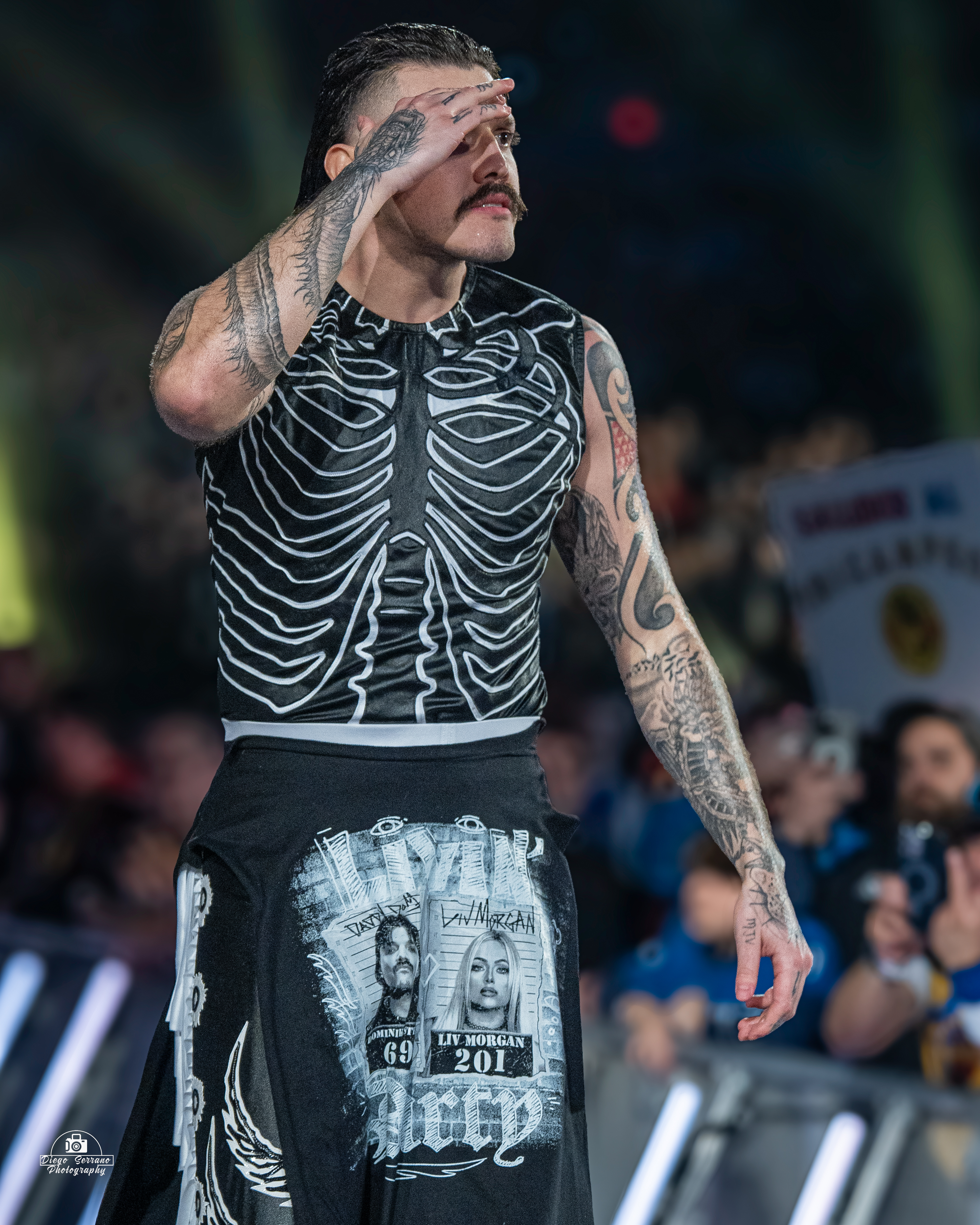
Mysterio in February 2025

In March 2025, his ring name was reverted to Dominik Mysterio. On Night 2 of WrestleMania 41 on April 20, Dominik defeated Bálor, Penta and defending champion Bron Breakker in a fatal four-way match to win the Intercontinental Championship. He successfully defended the title against Penta the next night on Raw and at Backlash on May 10. At the WWE and Lucha Libre AAA Worldwide (AAA) event Worlds Collide on June 7, Dominik appeared to challenge Octagón Jr. to a title match later that night at Money in the Bank, where he retained after interference from Morgan. Dominik successfully defended his title against AJ Styles on Night 2 of SummerSlam on August 3 and the September 1 episode of Raw. On the November 10 episode of Raw, Mysterio lost the Intercontinental Championship to John Cena, ending his reign at 204 days. He regained the title from Cena at Survivor Series: WarGames on November 29 in his hometown of San Diego, California. He lost the Intercontinental Championship to Penta on the March 2, 2026, episode of Raw, ending his second reign at 93 days.

At WrestleMania 42 Night 2 on April 19, 2026, Mysterio lost to former stablemate Finn Bálor in a Street Fight. The Judgment Day would then enter a feud with Danhausen after they tried to pay him $100,000 to curse Oba Femi which Danhausen would refuse but kept the money. At Night 2 of SummerSlam on August 2, Danhausen would defeat Mysterio in a "Human Monies" on a Pole match to keep the money. At Sunday Night's Main Event on September 6, Mysterio defeated Joe Hendry after interference from The Judgment Day.

=== Lucha Libre AAA Worldwide (2025–present) ===
On July 25, Dominik made his debut for WWE's sister promotion Lucha Libre AAA Worldwide (AAA) at Alianzas, where he attacked Dragon Lee and AAA Mega Champion El Hijo del Vikingo. At the next WWE and AAA event Worlds Collide: Las Vegas on September 12, Dominik defeated Vikingo to win the AAA Mega Championship, his first world championship, becoming the first wrestler to hold championships in WWE and AAA simultaneously.

On January 17, 2026, he started acting as a face in AAA, transitioning into a tweener in the process. He lost the Intercontinental Championship to Penta on the March 2, 2026, episode of Raw, ending his second reign as Intercontinental Champion and double champion at 93 days. At Rey de Reyes on March 14, he successfully defended the AAA Mega Championship against Vikingo in a Lucha de Apuestas match.At Verano de Escándalo on July 25, 2026, Mysterio abandoned El Grande Americano in their tag team match against Los Perros del Mal (Daga and Angel). After Perros del Mal gained the victory, Mysterio revealed that he had joined the El Ojo stable, aligning himself with Omos and Dorian Roldán, reverting to a heel. At Triplemanía 34, Mysterio lost his Mega Championship to Americano ending his year-long reign at 366 days. At Héroes Inmortales on October 24, Mysterio failed to regain the title from Americano after interference from Rey Mysterio.

== Personal life ==
Gutiérrez began dating his childhood sweetheart, Marie Juliette, on November 8, 2011; they met in high school when they were both 14. Gutiérrez announced their engagement on January 2, 2023. The couple were married on March 7, 2024.

== Championships and accomplishments ==
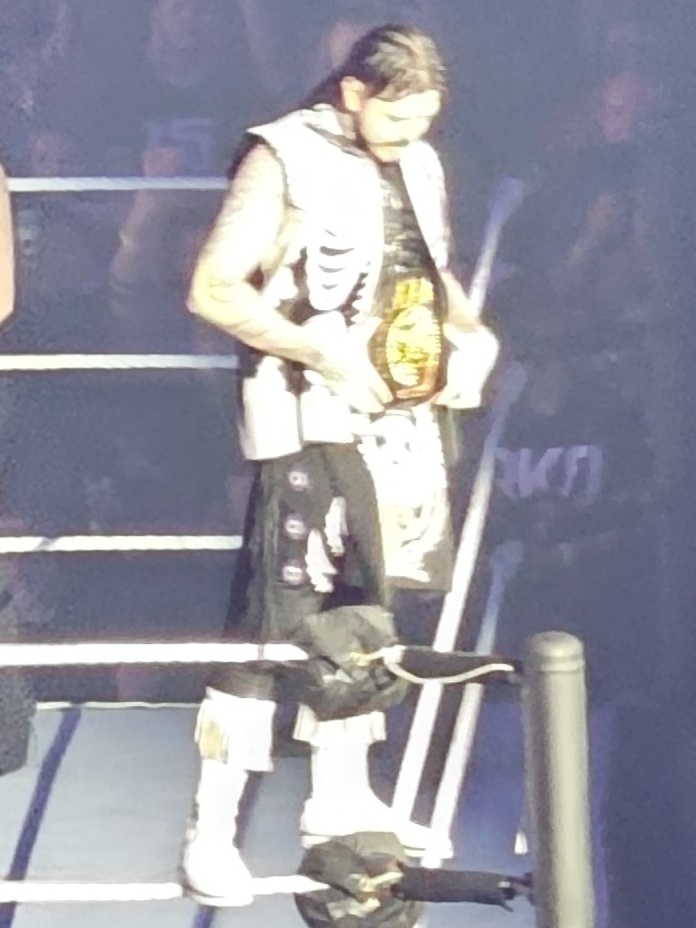
Mysterio as AAA Mega Champion

- Lucha Libre AAA Worldwide
  - AAA Mega Championship (1 time)
- ESPN
  - Ranked No. 1 of the 30 best Pro Wrestlers Under 30 in 2024
  - Male Wrestler of the Year (2025)
- New York Post
  - Faction of the Year (2023) as part of The Judgment Day
- Pro Wrestling Illustrated
  - Rookie of the Year (2020)
  - Faction of the Year (2023) as part of The Judgment Day
  - Most Hated Wrestler of the Year (2023, 2024)
  - Ranked No. 18 of the top 500 singles wrestlers in the PWI 500 in 2026
- WWE
  - WWE Intercontinental Championship (2 times)
  - NXT North American Championship (2 times)
  - WWE SmackDown Tag Team Championship (1 time) – with Rey Mysterio
  - Slammy Award (3 times)
    - Faction of the Year (2024) – as a member of The Judgment Day
    - Villain of the Year (2024)
    - Villain of the Year (2025) – with Liv Morgan
  - Bumpy Award (1 time)
    - Tag Team of the Half-Year (2021) – with Rey Mysterio
