= Kafu =

Brazilian retired professional wrestler

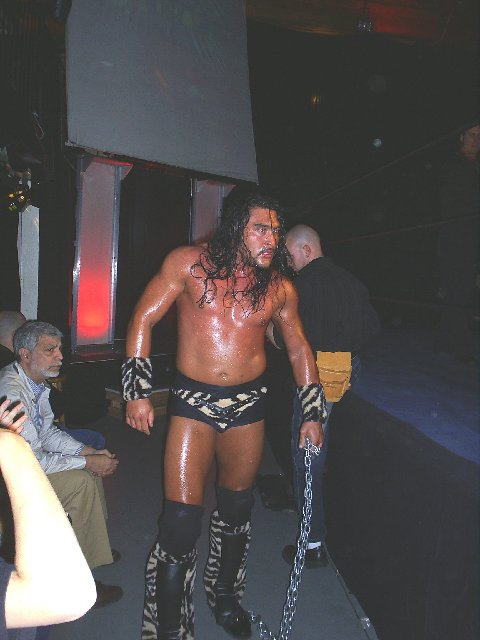

Personal information
- Born: Victor Ceron; August 27, 1978 (age 47) Rio de Janeiro, Brazil
- Website: Kafu official website

Professional wrestling career
- Ring name(s): Victor Calvio; Kabu; Kafu
- Billed height: 6 ft 4 in (1.93 m)
- Billed weight: 241 lb (109 kg)
- Trained by: Mestre Davi (Brazilian Wrestling Federation); All Pro Wrestling; Daniel Bryan; Robert Thompson; Michael Modest
- Debut: 2002
- Retired: 2014

Victor Ceron (born on August 27, 1978) is a Brazilian retired professional wrestler, currently a wrestling trainer for independent companies in San Jose, California promotions. Better known under his ring name Kafu, he has worked for All Pro Wrestling (APW), Inoki Dojo, International Wrestling Association, Big Time Wrestling, LLX (Mexico) World 1, PCW, NWA Pro, Portugal Wrestling, and the WWE development territory Florida Championship Wrestling. He has wrestled many well-known wrestlers, including Steve Corino, Jim Neidhart, Raven, Daniel Bryan, Savio Vega and The Sandman.

== Career ==
=== Pro Wrestling Revolution (2002-2008) ===
Kafu's love for wrestling started young but being a natural athlete, he was involved in so many sports but excelled as a basketball star in High School and got a scholarship to NCAA school. His next conquest was Capoeira. an Afro-Brazilian art form that combines elements of martial arts, music, and dance, where he carries a high-ranking belt for his hard work and dedication throughout his years.

Once the path of pro wrestling was in-front of him, he made it his goal to excel and push himself to limits that no other sport had laid before him. Working on the independent scene, establishing himself in the industry, he worked for companies all over the world.

His first break was International Wrestling Association in Puerto Rico, then Mexico, Portugal and Canada. In 2008, KAFU signed a developmental contract with World Wrestling Entertainment, he made his debut teaming up with Sheamus.

=== All Pro Wrestling (2002-2008) ===
Ceron made his debut at APW May Mayhem: Pacifica On May 11, 2002, he teamed with Larry Blackwell and Nikki in a six-man mix tag match against The Ballard Brothers and Cheerleader Melissa. While in All Pro Wrestling, Kafu won the APW Universal Heavyweight Championship on two occasions. His first reign began when he defeated Nate Rulez on June 11, 2005. He held the belt for almost six months before dropping it to Derek Sanders in December. During an APW card on April 15, 2006, he wrestled a Clockwork Orange House of Fun match against The Sandman but lost. Kafu's next title victory came when he defeated Dana Lee on October 14, 2006. While holding the belt, he was engaged in a feud with Oliver John. The two wrestled in several matches, but there was no decisive winner. Kafu's title reign came to an end on March 24, 2007, when John defeated him to win the championship. The feud continued, however, with John emerging victorious in subsequent matches.

He wrestled one of his final APW match on January 5, 2008, defeating Robert Thompson in a match that lasted 29 minutes. Ceron wrestled his last Independent circuit match before moving to WWE at Santa Maria High School, February 2, 2008, teaming up with Tito Aquino and Hijo de Rey Misterio. That night they wrestled the "Border Patrol". The match was back to back action but Kafu and his team could not come out on top and that lost them the match.

=== Other promotions (2006-2007) ===
In 2006, Kafu also competed for NWA Pro in California. He competed in a series of singles and tag team matches against Plague and defeated him in every encounter. In January 2007, Kafu competed in Pro Wrestling World-1 King's Cup Tournament. He wrestled Alex Law in the first round, but both wrestlers were eliminated when the match ended in a double countout. Later that year, Kafu worked for the International Wrestling Association in Puerto Rico. He competed against Savio Vega on several occasions. Kafu lost two tag team matches against Vega, but he defeated Vega by disqualification at IWA Puerto Rico Crash of the Titans on June 30, 2007.

=== World Wrestling Entertainment (2007-2009) ===
Ceron made his World Wrestling Entertainment (WWE) debut. He teamed with Oliver John, his APW rival, to face The Highlanders on the March 4, 2007 episode of Sunday Night Heat. During the match, he was billed as Kabu and John was billed as Oliver Stone.

On July 24, 2007, he competed in a handicap match for Extreme Championship Wrestling, teaming with Jimmy Cruz in a loss to Big Daddy V. Ceron was billed as Victor Calvio for the match.

In January 2008, it was announced that Ceron had signed a developmental contract with World Wrestling Entertainment. Kafu made his debut teaming up with Sheamus on February 19, 2008 in a Tag Team Tournament which the winners would become the first ever FCW Florida Tag Team Champions. Their first match was against Christopher Gray and Tommy Taylor with Dave Taylor. Kafu and Sheamus came out on top and that moved them to the next round. They were defeated by Brad Allen and Nick Nemeth the next round. On the November edition of WWE Magazine in 2008, Ceron was featured in an article "FCW's Tomorrow's WWE Superstars...Today." He was released from his developmental contract on June 6, 2009.

=== Extreme Canadian Championship Wrestling (2009-2010) ===
On June 15, 2009, Ceron, under his Kafu ring name, debuted for Extreme Canadian Championship Wrestling. On March 28, 2010, Ceron, under his Kafu ring name, faced Ian Richardson & Lucky Cannon in a non televised event. Lucky Cannon won the match defeated Ceron (Kafu) & Ian Richarson, after the match all three of them said goodbye to the company and announced all three retirements.

=== Return to Pro Wrestling Revolution (2010-2014) ===
Kafu returned to Pro Wrestling Revolution in 2010. He retired from wrestling in 2014.

== Championships and accomplishments ==
- Pro Wrestling Revolution

- PWR Tag Team Championship with El Dinamita

- All Pro Wrestling

- APW Universal Heavyweight Championship (2 times)

- Pro Wrestling Illustrated

- PWI ranked him #379 of the 500 best singles wrestlers in the PWI 500 in 2008
