= Tommy Drake =

American professional wrestler (born 1979)

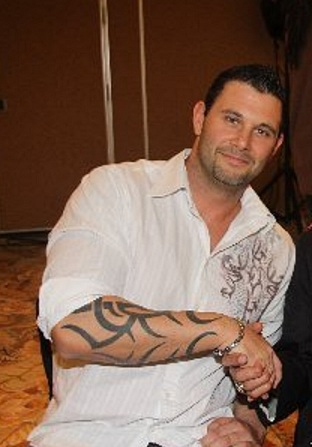

Personal information
- Born: Cory R. Carey; August 21, 1979 (age 46) Des Moines, Iowa

Professional wrestling career
- Ring name(s): Tommy Blaze; Tommy Drake
- Billed height: 6 ft 4 in (1.93 m)
- Billed weight: 275 lb (125 kg)
- Billed from: Des Moines, Iowa; Phoenix, Arizona
- Trained by: Michael Modest; Donovan Morgan; Rick Thompson
- Debut: December 12, 2000

Cory R. Carey (born August 21, 1979) is an American professional wrestler, better known by his ring name, Tommy Drake. He is best known for his appearances with Pro Wrestling Noah in Japan and various independent promotions in the United States. Drake wrestled dark matches for World Wrestling Entertainment, and made regular appearances on Monday Night Raw and SmackDown.

== Career ==
Carey grew up in rural Iowa, and began wrestling at age 5. Carey attended Canby High School in Oregon, graduating in 1997 at age seventeen. Working odd jobs after high school, Carey moved to Hayward, California, at the request of Ed "Moondog" Moretti, and attended the All Pro Wrestling (APW) Boot Camp. There he was trained by Michael Modest, Donovan Morgan, and Ric Thompson. He debuted in APW on December 12, 2000 in Vallejo, California as Tommy Blaze, scoring a victory over Kid Chrome.

Soon after his debut Drake began feuding with various APW wrestlers. In 2000, Drake and Donovan Morgan began the training of The Great Khali. Khali lived with Drake in a small apartment in Hayward, until Khali left for Japan and eventually the World Wrestling Entertainment (WWE).

After a falling out with APW, Drake jumped ship to Pro Wrestling Iron, started by Morgan and Mike Modest. Drake became an assistant trainer, and would train PWI's students when not in Japan. In 2001 he helped further the training of Tough Enough winner John Morrison, who went on to become the ECW Champion.

Drake's first tour of Japan came in 2001. Drake tag teamed with Scorpio and Bison Smith, and faced such opponents as Jun Akiyama, Mitsuharu Misawa, Kenta Kobashi, and Yoshihiro Takayama.

Drake wrestled his last match for WWE on March 27, 2003 in San Jose. He faced Sean O'Haire on SmackDown. Drake was upset with O'Haire after dropping him on his head twice during the match. Drake felt that the companies in the United States were about hiring wrestlers with great looks but lacking talent. Drake did not work for WWE any further.

Pro Wrestling Iron, held its first show on May 31, 2002 in Ukiah, California. PWI negotiated a talent swap agreement with Noah that saw Japanese wrestlers such as Mitsuharu Misawa, Naoya Ogawa, and Takao Omori appear on PWI shows. Drake teamed up with Bison Smith to face Danny Dominion and Ace Steel. Drake and Bison scored a victory, with the match lasting for 50 minutes.

== Current independent and other work ==
In 2003 Drake moved to Phoenix, Arizona, and began wrestling for Impact Zone Wrestling. Drake wrestles for IZW and AZWO in Arizona from time to time, but has yet to make a full comeback. Drake was the main event in 2006 when he faced TNA Impact star Relic at Wild West Championship Wrestling's inaugural show. The show was held at a boxing sport arena in Phoenix, Arizona. In October 2007 Drake starred in the reality show Casting Call, filming for Big Sky Motion Pictures in New Orleans. The show was set to air in conjunction with writer/director Mars Callahan's movie, Spring Break '83. Drake joined the CWFA in 2010 and is the current World Champion. Drake won the championship in September 2013, beating The Hawaiian Lion, Graves, and Alexander Hammerstone in a fatal 4 way match.

== Championships and accomplishments ==
- All Pro Wrestling
  - APW Internet Championship (1 times)
  - APW Universal Championship (1 times)
- Cauliflower Alley Club
  - CAC Future Legend Award Runner Up (2003)
- Midwest Championship Wrestling
  - MCW T3 Tournament Finalist (1 time)- with Vinnie Massaro
- Pro Wrestling Iron
  - PWI Tag Team Championship (1 time)
- Arizona Wrestling Order
  - AZWO Heavyweight Championship (1 time)
- Championship Wrestling from Arizona
  - CWFA Heavyweight Championship (1 time)
- Future Stars of Wrestling
  - FSW Heavyweight Championship (2 time)
