= APW Tag Team Championship =

Professional wrestling tag team championship

Details
- Promotion: All Pro Wrestling
- Date established: November 20, 1996
- Date retired: Winter 2024
Statistics
- First champions: Michael Modest and Steve Rizzono
- Final champions: Cory Dayton and Frank Lee Gorgeous
- Most reigns: (As a Tag Team); The Ballard Brothers and The Classic Connection (3 times) (As individual); Robert Thompson and Tony Jones (5 times)
- Longest reign: War Beast (996 days)
- Shortest reign: Original Westside Playaz (<1 day)

The APW Tag Team Championships were introduced on November 20, 1996, when Michael Modest and Steve Rizzono became the first to win the titles. They defeated Frank Dalton and Joe Applebaumer in the finals of an eight team tournament to win the titles.

On December 14, 2011, All Pro Wrestling announced that they had come to terms with Vendetta Pro Wrestling to recognize the Vendetta Pro Tag-Team Championship, and to have them defended in both Vendetta Pro and in APW as the "Unified" Tag Team Titles. The titles were defended for the first time in APW on January 14, 2011, as champions Greg Hernandez and Jesse Jimenez defended against APW's team of Jody Kristofferson and Dalton Frost. Since then, the APW/Vendetta Pro Unified Tag Team Champions will often wear one Vendetta Pro title belt along with one APW title belt.

This relationship came to an end in 2014 when Vendetta Pro returned to having their own set of tag belts, following this the APW would reinstate the championships.

The Championships were retired in the winter of 2024 there have been 39 reigns among 32 teams and 44 wrestlers with eight vacancies. The inaugural champions were Michael Modest and Steve Rizzono. Reno Scum (Adam Thornstowe and Luster The Legend), Classic Connection (Buddy Royal and Levi Shapiro), and Lion Power (Marcus Lewis and Will Hobbs) have the most reigns as teams with three. Robert Thompson and Tony Jones have the most reigns individually with five. Reno Scum have the longest combined reigns, as a team/individual wrestlers, at 860 days. War Beast (Jacob Fatu and Josef Samael) have the longest singular reign, as a team/individual wrestlers, at 996 days. Original Westside Playaz (Robert Thompson and Tony Jones) have the shortest reign, as a team/individual wrestlers, at less than a day. Reno Scum and Classic Connection have the most combined defenses, as a team/individual wrestlers. with ten. EGO (AJ Kirsch and Nathan Rulez), The Westside Playaz 2000 (Boyce LeGrande and Robert Thompson), and Immortal Fear (Billy Blade and Kaden) have the most defenses over a singular reign, as a team/individual wrestlers with ten.

The final champions were Cory Dayton and Frank Lee Gorgeous.

== Title history ==
Key
No.	Overall reign number
Reign	Reign number for the specific team—reign numbers for the individuals are in parentheses, if different
Days	Number of days held
Defenses	Number of successful defenses
<1	Reign lasted less than a day
+	Current reign is changing daily

No.	Champion	Championship change			Reign statistics			Notes	Ref.
No.	Champion	Date	Event	Location	Reign	Days	Defenses	Notes	Ref.
1	Michael Modest and Steve Rizzono	November 20, 1996	APW Tag Team Tournament ′96	Hayward, CA	1	66	3	Modest and Rizzono became the first APW Tag Team Champions by defeating Frank Dalton and Joe Applebaumer in the finals of an eight team tournament.	
2	Robert Thompson and Donovan Morgan	January 25, 1997	APW Doomsday	Hayward, CA	1	188	3		
3	Tony Jones and Jay Smooth	August 1, 1997	Live event	Hayward, CA	1	49	1		
4	The Grimes Brothers (Vic Grimes and Dic Grimes)	September 19, 1997	APW Mystery Card	Hayward, CA	1	62	0		
—	Vacated	November 20, 1997	—	—	—	—	—	The tag titles were vacated due to Vic getting suspended on an indefinite period of time	
5	Robert Thompson (2) and Chris Cole	November 22, 1997	N/A	Hayward, CA	1	14	0	Defeated Michael Modest and Donovan Morgan in a tournament final to win the vacant titles	
6	Tony Jones (2) and Steve Rizzono (2)	December 6, 1997	N/A	Hayward, CA	1	42	0		
—	Vacated	January 17, 1998	—	—	—	—	—	Vacated due to Steve Rizzono being fired from APW	
7	Michael Modest (2) and Tony Jones (3)	February 21, 1998	N/A	Hayward, CA	1	84	3	Defeated Frank Murdoch and Jay Smooth to win the vacant titles	
8	Frank Murdoch and Boom-Boom Comini	May 16, 1998	N/A	Pinole, CA	1	14	0		
—	Vacated	May 30, 1998	—	—	—	—	—	Vacated due to Comini being unable to defend the titles	
9	The Murdoch Cousins (Frank Murdoch(2) and Vic Murdoch(2))	May 30, 1998	N/A	Pacifica, CA	1	27	0	Defeated Tony Jones and Ed Moretti to win the vacant titles. Vic Murdoch was formerly known as Vic Grimes	
—	Vacated	June 26, 1998	—	—	—	—	—	The Murdochss failed to defend the titles within the two-month title defense period due to Vic Murdoch's (Vic Grimes)′s obligations to the WWF. The status of the title remained in limbo after that.	
10	The Westside Playaz 2000 (Boyce LeGrande and Robert Thompson (3))	May 6, 2000	N/A	Pacifica, CA	1	343	10	Defeated Jardi Franz and Vinniy Massaro to win the vacant titles	
—	Vacated	April 14, 2001	—	Vallejo, CA	—	—	—		
11	The Original Westside Playaz (Robert Thompson (4) and Tony Jones (4))	April 14, 2001	APW Only In California	Vallejo, CA	1	53	1		
12	Boyce LeGrande (2) and Mark Smith	June 9, 2001	APW Game Over	Vallejo, CA	1	49	0		
13	The Ballard Brothers (Shane Ballard and Shannon Ballard)	July 28, 2001	APW Welcome Back	Vallejo, CA	1	63	1		
14	The Original Westside Playaz (Robert Thompson (5) and Tony Jones (5))	September 29, 2001	APW Tough Love	Vallejo, CA	2	<1	0		
—	Vacated	September 29, 2001	APW Tough Love	Vallejo, CA	—	—	—		
15	Immortal Fear (Billy Blade and Kaden)	December 4, 2004	APW Kristmas Kaos 2004	Hayward, CA	1	259	10		
16	The Mafia (Chris Colione and Vennis DeMarco)	August 28, 2005	APW Gym Wars	Hayward, CA	1	55	1		
17	All Pro Rangers (Kid Omega and Kyu Ketsui)	October 22, 2005	APW Halloween Hell 8	Bakersfield, CA	1	42	2		
18	The Mafia (Chris Colione and Vennis DeMarco)	December 3, 2005	APW Kristmas Kaos 2005	Hayward, CA	2	56	0		
19	Derek Sanders and Payton	January 28, 2006	APW Gym Wars	Hayward, CA	1	14	0		
—	Vacated	February 11, 2006	—	Hayward, CA	—	—	—		
20	EGO (AJ Kirsch and Nathan Rulez)	February 11, 2006	APW Gym Wars	Hayward, CA	1	476	10		
21	Ground And Pound (Dana Lee and Tito Aquino)	June 2, 2007	APW Gym Wars	Hayward, CA	1	70	0		
22	Bloodline (Billy Blade and Gangrel)	August 11, 2007	APW Gym Wars	Hayward, CA	1	147	2		
23	The Border Patrol (Derek Sanders (2) and Nathan Rules(2))	January 5, 2008	APW Gym Wars	Hayward, CA	1	?	0		
—	Vacated	2008	—	—	—	—	—	Sanders and Rules vacated the titles, but the exact date of the start of the vacancy is unknown	
24	Boyce LeGrande (3) and Mustafa Saed	October 26, 2013	APW Bayshore Bash	Hayward, CA	1	140	0		
25	Classic Connection (Buddy Royal and Levi Shapiro)	March 15, 2014	APW Bayshore Bash	Daly City, CA	1	279	3		
26	Idris Jackson and Sionne Finau	March 15, 2014	APW Kristmas Kaos 2014	Daly City, CA	1	84	0	This was a 4-way match also involving Jeckles The Jester/Jinxx and Julio Pedroza/Vinny Massaro	
27	Classic Connection (Buddy Royal and Levi Shapiro)	March 13, 2015	APW Friday The 13th Part 2	Daly City, CA	2	280	6		
28	Reno Scum (Adam Thornstowe and Luster The Legend)	December 18, 2015	APW Kristmas Kaos 2015	Daly City, CA	1	329	3		
29	Lion Power (Marcus Lewis and Will Hobbs)	November 11, 2016	APW Cow Palace Royale	Pacifica, CA	1	134	1		
30	Classic Connection (Buddy Royal and Levi Shapiro)	March 25, 2017	APW Legends Are Born	Daly City, CA	3	72	1		
31	Lion Power (Marcus Lewis and Will Hobbs)	May 6, 2017	APW Cow Palace Royale	San Francisco, CA	2	62	1	This was a handicap match; Royal and Shapiro teamed with their manager, Brian Zane.	
32	The Black Armada (Papo Esco and Synn)	July 7, 2017	APW Bay Area Bash 2017	Daly City, CA	1	126	2		
33	Lion Power (Marcus Lewis and Will Hobbs)	November 10, 2017	APW Clash At The Cow Palace	San Francisco, CA	3	127	0		
34	Reno Scum (Adam Thornstowe and Luster The Legend)	March 17, 2018	APW Kick Rocks	Daly City, CA	2	69	1		
35	Reno Over Everything (Karl Fredericks and Styker)	May 25, 2018	APW We Out Here 2018	Concord, CA	1	42	1		
36	Reno Scum (Adam Thornstowe and Luster The Legend)	July 6, 2018	APW/PWR King of the Indies 2018	Daly City, CA	3	462	6		
37	Warbeast (Jacob Fatu and Josef Samael)	October 11, 2019	WCPW Nobody Does It Better	San Francisco, CA	1	996	0	This was a three-way match also involving The One Percent (Jorel Nelson and Royce Isaacs).	
—	Vacated	July 3, 2022	—	—	—	—	—	The titles were vacated for unknown reasons.	
38	The Bad Boys (Derek Slade and Dominic Teixeira)	September 3, 2022	APW Bay Area Bash 2022	Daly City, CA	1	1,441	0	This was a four-way match also involving La Rebelion Amarilla (Bestia 666 and Mecha Wolf), The Stoner Brothers (Rick Scott Stoner and Scott Rick Stoner), and Matt Carlos and Rik Luxury.	
39	Cory Dayton and Frank Lee Gorgeous	September 6, 2023	N/A	Daly City, CA	1	482	1		
—	Deactivated	December 31, 2024	—	—	—	—	—	The titles were deactivated when the promotion ceased operations.	

== Combined reigns ==
¤	The exact length of the title reign is unknown, defenses as well

Rank	Team	No. of reigns	Combined defenses	Combined days
1	Warbeast (Jacob Fatu and Josef Samael)	1	0	996
2	Reno Scum (Adam Thornstowe and Luster The Legend)	3	10	860
3	Classic Connection (Buddy Royal and Levi Shapiro)	3	10	631
4	Cory Dayton and Frank Lee Gorgeous	1	1	482
5	EGO (AJ Kirsch and Nathan Rulez)	1	10	476
6	Bad Boys (Derek Slade and Dominic Teixeira)	1	0	368
7	The Westside Playaz 2000 (Boyce LeGrande and Robert Thompson)	1	10	343
8	Lion Power (Marcus Lewis and Will Hobbs)	3	2	323
9	Immortal Fear (Billy Blade and Kaden)	1	10	259
10	Robert Thompson and Donovan Morgan	1	3	188
11	Bloodline (Billy Blade and Gangrel)	1	2	147
12	Boyce LeGrande and Mustafa Saed	1	0	140
13	The Black Armada (Papo Esco and Synn)	1	2	126
14	The Mafia (Chris Colione and Vennis DeMarco)	2	1	111
15	Michael Modest and Tony Jones	1	3	84
16	Idris Jackson and Sionne Finau	1	0	84
17	Ground And Pound (Dana Lee and Tito Aquino)	1	0	70
18	Michael Modest and Steve Rizzono	1	3	66
19	The Ballard Brothers (Shane Ballard and Shannon Ballard)	1	1	63
20	The Grimes Brothers (Vic Grimes and Dic Grimes)	1	0	62
21	The Original Westside Playaz (Robert Thompson and Tony Jones)	2	1	53
22	Tony Jones and Jay Smooth	1	1	49
23	Boyce LeGrande and Mark Smith	1	0	49
24	All Pro Rangers (Kid Omega and Kyu Ketsui)	1	2	42
25	Reno Over Everything (Karl Fredericks and Styker)	1	1	42
26	Tony Jones and Steve Rizzono	1	0	42
27	The Murdoch Cousins (Frank Murdoch and Vic Murdoch)	1	0	27
28	Robert Thompson and Chris Cole	1	0	14
29	Frank Murdoch and Boom-Boom Comini	1	0	14
30	Derek Sanders and Payton	1	0	14
31	The Border Patrol (Derek Sanders and Nathan Rulez)	1	N/A¤	N/A¤

=== By wrestler ===
Rank	Wrestler	No. of reigns	Combined defenses	Combined days
1	Jacob Fatu	1	0	996
1	Josef Samael	1	0	996
3	Adam Thornstowe	3	10	860
3	Luster The Legend	3	10	860
4	Buddy Royal	3	10	631
4	Levi Shapiro	3	10	631
9	Robert Thompson	5	14	601
10	Boyce LeGrande	3	10	532
11	Cory Dayton	1	1	482
11	Frank Lee Gorgeous	1	1	482
12	Nathan Rulez	2	10	476¤
13	AJ Kirsch	1	10	476
14	Billy Blade	2	12	406
15	Derek Slade	1	2	368
15	Dominic Teixeira	1	2	368
16	Marcus Lewis	3	2	323
16	Will Hobbs	3	2	323
17	Kaden	1	10	259
18	Tony Jones	5	5	231
19	Donovan Morgan	1	3	188
20	Michael Modest	2	6	147
21	Gangrel	1	2	147
22	Mustafa Saed	1	0	140
23	Papo Esco	1	2	126
23	Synn	1	2	126
24	Chris Colione	2	1	111
24	Vennis DeMarco	2	1	111
25	Steve Rizzono	2	3	105
26	Vic/Vic Murdoch	2	0	89
27	Idris Jackson	1	0	84
27	Sionne Finau	1	0	84
28	Dana Lee	1	0	70
28	Tito Aquino	1	0	70
29	Shane Ballard	1	1	63
29	Shannon Ballard	1	1	63
30	Dic Grimes	1	0	62
31	Jay Smooth	1	1	49
31	Mark Smith	1	0	49
32	Kid Omega	1	2	42
32	Kyu Ketsui	1	2	42
32	Karl Fredericks	1	1	42
32	Styker	1	1	42
40	Frank Murdoch	2	0	41
41	Derek Sanders	2	0	14¤
42	Chris Cole	1	0	14
42	Boom-Boom Comini	1	0	14
42	Payton	1	0	14

== See also ==
- All Pro Wrestling
- APW Universal Heavyweight Championship
- APW Worldwide Internet Championship
