= T. J. Perkins =

American professional wrestler (born 1984)

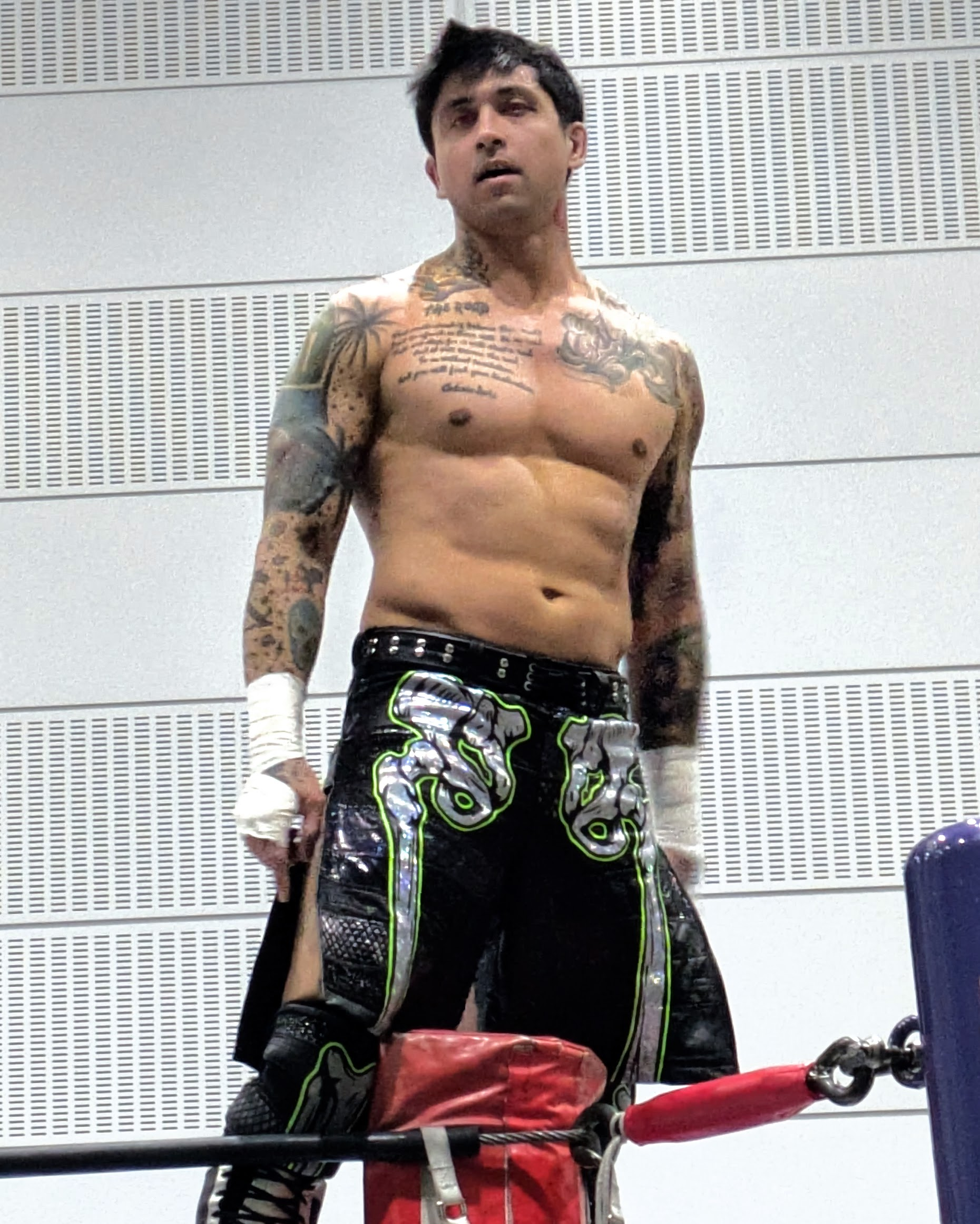
- TJP in 2025

Personal information
- Born: Theodore James Perkins; September 3, 1984 (age 42) Kansas City, Missouri, U.S.
- Spouse: Aria Blake (m. 2023)
- Children: 2

Professional wrestling career
- Ring name(s): John Johnson; Havana Pitbull III; Manik; Pinoy Boy; Puma; Suicide; Sydistiko; T.J. Perkins; TJP
- Billed height: 5 ft 7 in (170 cm)
- Billed weight: 167 lb (76 kg)
- Billed from: Los Angeles, California; Philippines; Parts Unknown
- Trained by: Kevin Quinn; Christopher Daniels; NJPW Dojo; Antonio Inoki; Negro Casas
- Debut: August 1998

Theodore James Perkins (born September 3, 1984), also known by his ring name T. J. Perkins or simply TJP, is an American professional wrestler. He currently performs as a freelancer. Perkins is best known for his time with WWE, Impact Wrestling, and New Japan Pro-Wrestling (NJPW), where he was the second leader of United Empire and a former three-time IWGP Junior Heavyweight Tag Team Champion with Francesco Akira.

Perkins began his professional wrestling career in 1998. In 2001, he went to the NJPW Dojo, where he became the youngest wrestler to perform in a NJPW ring. Since then, Perkins worked in various U.S. promotions, such as Ring of Honor (ROH), Major League Wrestling (MLW), TNA Wrestling, and WWE, as well as Japanese promotions, like NJPW and Dragon Gate. In 2013, Perkins signed a contract with Total Nonstop Action Wrestling and worked as Manik, a masked character originally based on the Suicide gimmick. During his time in TNA, he would win the TNA X Division Championship. He also joined The Revolution stable. In 2016, he left TNA and participated in the Cruiserweight Classic tournament produced by WWE, which he won and was crowned the inaugural WWE Cruiserweight Champion. Perkins would work for WWE until his release in February 2019. He then returned to Impact Wrestling, as well as working in other companies on the side. In 2020, he won the Impact X Division Championship for a second time. He also returned to NJPW again and began making regular appearances, later becoming the IWGP Junior Heavyweight Tag Team Champion (with Francesco Akira). He left NJPW in 2025 and became a freelancer, performing for various promotions.

== Early life ==
Theodore James Perkins was born on September 3, 1984, in Kansas City, Missouri. He is of Filipino descent through his mother, who comes from Manila, Philippines, and learned Filipino culture growing up with his family in Riverside, California. He attended St. Thomas the Apostle School and Poly High School in Riverside, California, and at the age of eighteen, began training in boxing, mixed martial arts, and catch wrestling.

== Professional wrestling career ==
=== Early career (1998–2001) ===
Perkins first began his training at the age of 13, at a local lucha libre school in his hometown of Los Angeles, California. Perkins debuted in August 1998, under a mask as promoters felt he looked too young to be wrestling. Initially, he wrestled under the ring name T.J. Perkins, utilizing "Pinoy Boy" as a nickname. In order to attend shows, he had to be absent from school most Fridays. He wrestled on independent cards in California, Nevada, Arizona, and Mexico during his first two years.

=== New Japan Pro-Wrestling (2001–2005) ===
In 2001, Perkins began training at New Japan Pro-Wrestling (NJPW)'s Inoki Dojo in Los Angeles along with Ricky Reyes, Rocky Romero, and Bryan Danielson. They all made their debut in NJPW on the same Korakuen Hall card in October 2002, with Perkins debuting as the maskless "Pinoy Boy" T.J. Perkins. At the age of 18 in 2003, following his third tour with NJPW, he was given the gimmick (character) of Puma, a masked character with similarities to Tiger Mask, and he began teaming with Tiger Mask IV. Perkins stated the character was created due to perceived similarities between himself and the original Tiger Mask, Satoru Sayama, and the idea was that he would be the American version of Tiger Mask.

=== Independent circuit (2003–2016) ===
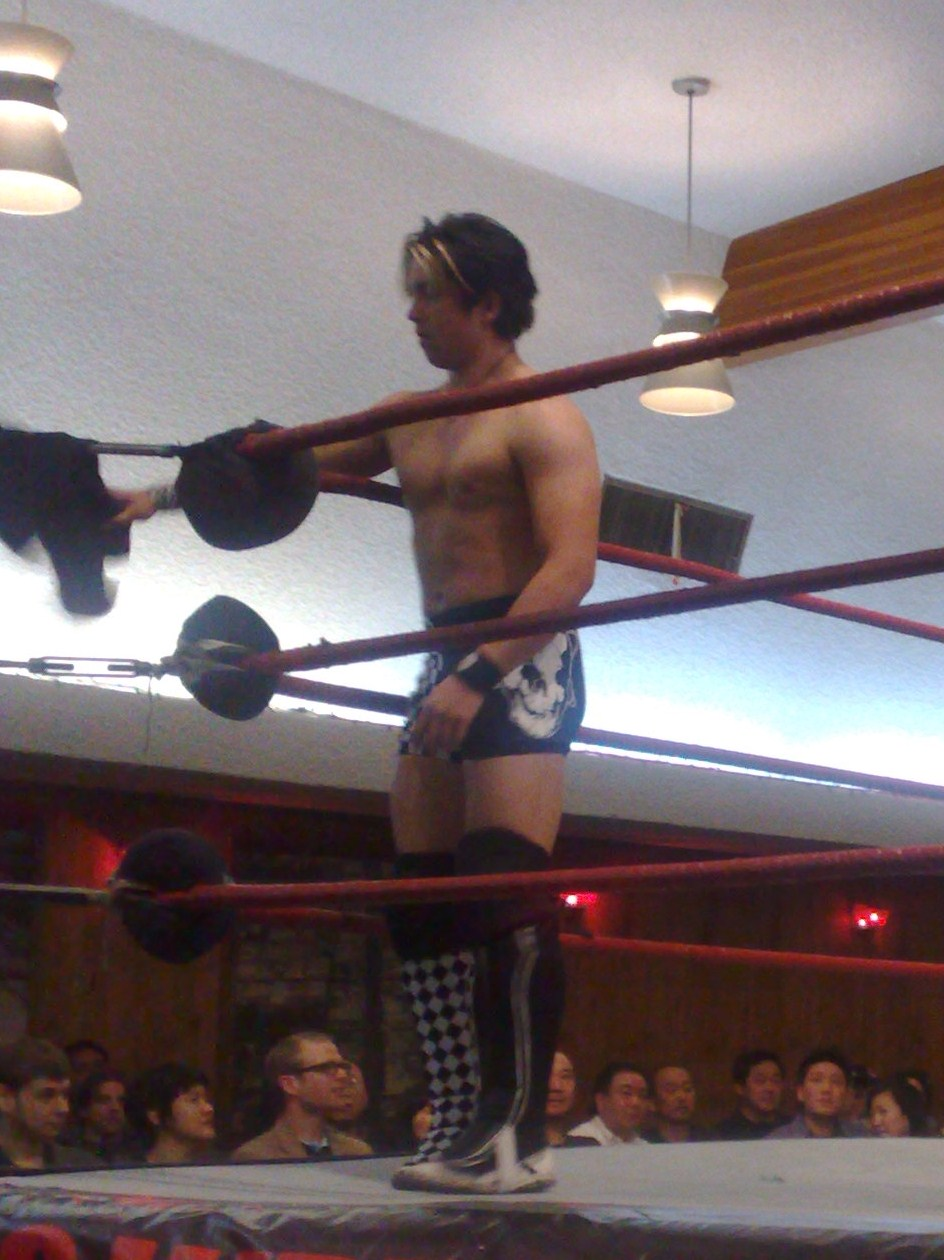
Perkins in the ring in 2008

In 2003, Perkins spent time in Mexico with Rocky Romero and Bobby Quance, where the trio trained with and wrestled for Consejo Mundial de Lucha Libre. In January 2004, the masked Puma wrestled on two Major League Wrestling television tapings, teaming with Bobby Quance in a loss to The Stampede Bulldogs (Harry Smith and TJ Wilson). The following night, Puma lost a four-way match featuring Jack Evans, Chasyn Rance and MLW Junior Heavyweight Champion Sonjay Dutt. In December 2004, Puma won the All Pro Wrestling (APW) Worldwide Internet Championship by defeating J.J. Perez. He held the championship until July 2005, when he lost it to Perez.

In January 2005, Perkins as Puma debuted in Full Impact Pro (FIP) by defeating Azrieal. At Unfinished Business, Puma was attacked by Azrieal and his ally CM Punk, and at the following show Puma lost a singles match to Punk. On February 12, Puma won a four-way match against Azrieal, Jerrelle Clark, and Eddie Vegas. Four years later, he returned to FIP as T.J. Perkins, in a loss to Davey Richards on March 28, 2009. He developed a winning streak, defeating Jay Bradley, Nigel McGuinness, and Sal Rinauro. In November 2009, Perkins entered the 2009 Jeff Peterson Memorial Cup, defeating Arik Cannon and Shane Hollister en route to the semi-finals, where he lost to Richards. In April 2010 at Southern Stampede, he returned to FIP using the ring name TJP, where he participated in a battle royal before he defeated Chasyn Rance.

Puma wrestled in the 2005 edition of the East Coast Wrestling Association'a Super 8 tournament and made it to the final by defeating Eric Matlock and J.J. Perez, before losing to Petey Williams. He also competed in Extreme Canadian Championship Wrestling's Pacific Cup in 2005, where he faced Aaron Idol and Bryan Danielson in a three-way match in the final, which was won by Idol.

In August 2005, Perkins debuted in UWA Hardcore Wrestling as Puma, in a loss to Ricky Reyes. In May 2006, Puma defeated M-Dogg 20 to win the UWA Canadian Championship. He successfully defended the championship against Petey Williams the following month, before losing the championship to M-Dogg 20 in July. In October, Puma participated in UWA's Grand Prix Tournament, where he defeated Kazuchika Okada and Dan Paysan en route to the final, where he lost to Sonjay Dutt. He continued wrestling for UWA throughout 2007, competing against wrestlers including Último Dragón and Daisuke Hanaoka.

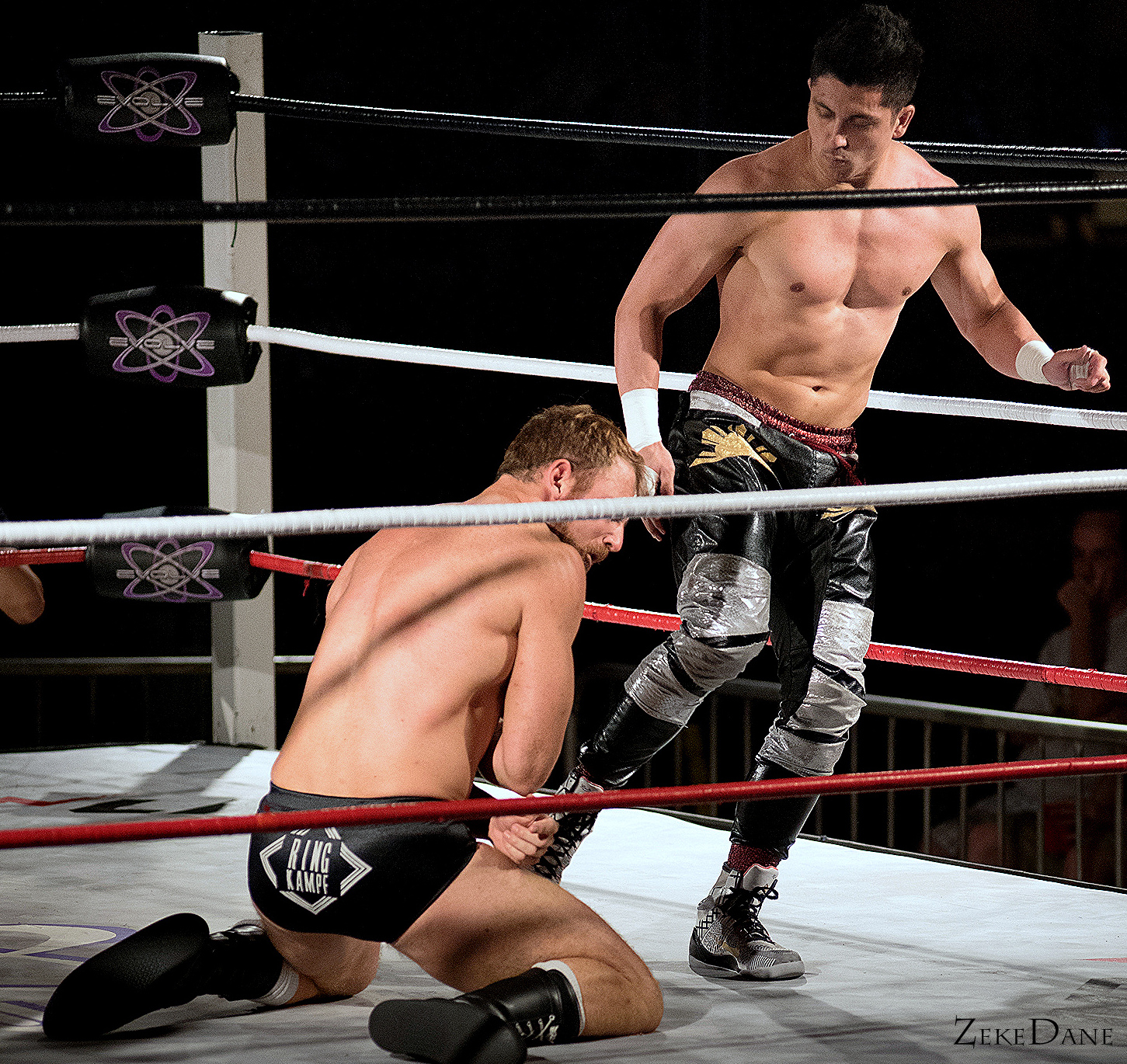
Perkins at an Evolve show against Timothy Thatcher in 2016

Perkins debuted in the Empire Wrestling Federation (EWF) on September 22, 2005, at Chaos, teaming with Dan Kobrick to defeat Big Ugly and Vinnie Massaro. On December 23, at EWF's Holiday Fear Perkins challenged EWF Cruiserweight Champion Joey Harder in a Triple Threat Championship match, which also involved Rocky Romero and was won by the defending champion Harder. Perkins continued to challenge Harder for the Cruiserweight Championship. In a match on February 12, 2006, Harder defeated Perkins by submission. On September 8, Perkins faced EWF World Champion Bino Gambino, defeating him by countout. When the match was restarted, they wrestled to a draw. On November 21, Perkins again failed to win the EWF Cruiserweight Championship, when he was defeated by new champion Ryan Taylor. In November 2006, Perkins entered the EWF's Inland Title Series Tournament. His first match against Harder ended in a draw, before he defeated Hook Bomberry in the second round and Jason King in the third round. He faced Harder in the final on January 5, 2007, but lost via submission. On June 27, 2008, at Knockdown Dragout 2, the team of Perkins and Liger Rivera (collectively known as Famous For Fearless) challenged La Ola Del Mal for the EWF Tag Team Championship, and were successful.

In 2006, Puma wrestled as part of MTV's inaugural television taping for the Wrestling Society X (WSX) promotion, participating in a battle royal but being eliminated by Vampiro and competing in dark matches against Altar Boy Luke and Human Tornado. In a 2009 interview, Perkins stated he asked to be released from his contract with WSX, calling the promotion "terrible". Over the next two years, Perkins competed for several different National Wrestling Alliance promotions, and on June 1, 2008, at Mach One Wrestling's debut show, he won a battle royal to become the NWA Heritage Champion.

He began working for Dragon Gate USA and Evolve in 2010 as TJP. On Evolve's first show he faced Munenori Sawa in a losing effort, before defeating Kyle O'Reilly at Evolve 3. In Dragon Gate USA, he defeated Gran Akuma at the DGUSA Fearless pay-per-view. In March 2010, Perkins made his debut for Westside Xtreme Wrestling at their debut show in the United States, losing to Zack Sabre Jr. He also travelled to Germany to wrestle for the promotion in July 2010.

=== Pro Wrestling Guerrilla (2003–2015) ===
Perkins first began competing in the Southern California promotion Pro Wrestling Guerrilla (PWG) in 2003 as "Pinoy Boy" T.J. Perkins, appearing at Are You Adequately Prepared To Rock?! where he pinned Vito Thomaselli and An Inch Longer Than Average where he was on the losing end of a six-man tag team match. After changing his ring name to Puma in December 2003, he entered the Tango and Cash Invitational Tournament to determine the inaugural PWG World Tag Team Champions with Samoa Joe as his partner. The pair made it to the second round before being eliminated. Throughout the remainder of 2004, Puma competed regularly in singles matches, defeating competitors including Ricky Reyes, Tony Kozina, Brad Bradley, and The UK Kid. In the first half of the following year, he competed sporadically in PWG, mainly in elimination matches.

In July 2005, he changed his ring name to TJ Perkins, and defeated Davey Richards and Hardkore Kidd in successive singles matches, but Perkins and Alex Shelley subsequently lost a tag team match to the duo. Perkins went on to lose a singles match to Shelley at After School Special. Perkins finished out the year in tag team matches with various partners, and began 2006 the same way. He transitioned back into singles competition at Beyond The Thunderdome in March 2006, defeating Mr. Excitement, before embarking on a losing streak that lasted until June, when he defeated Excalibur. His losing streak included a loss to Rocky Romero in singles competition and alongside him in a tag team match. The duo faced off again at Self-Titled in October, which Perkins won, but he lost a rematch that same month. He later developed a feud with Bino Gambino, facing him in several six-man tag team matches in early 2007. In May, Perkins defeated Gambino in a singles match, before they returned to being on opposite sides in tag team matches in mid-2007.

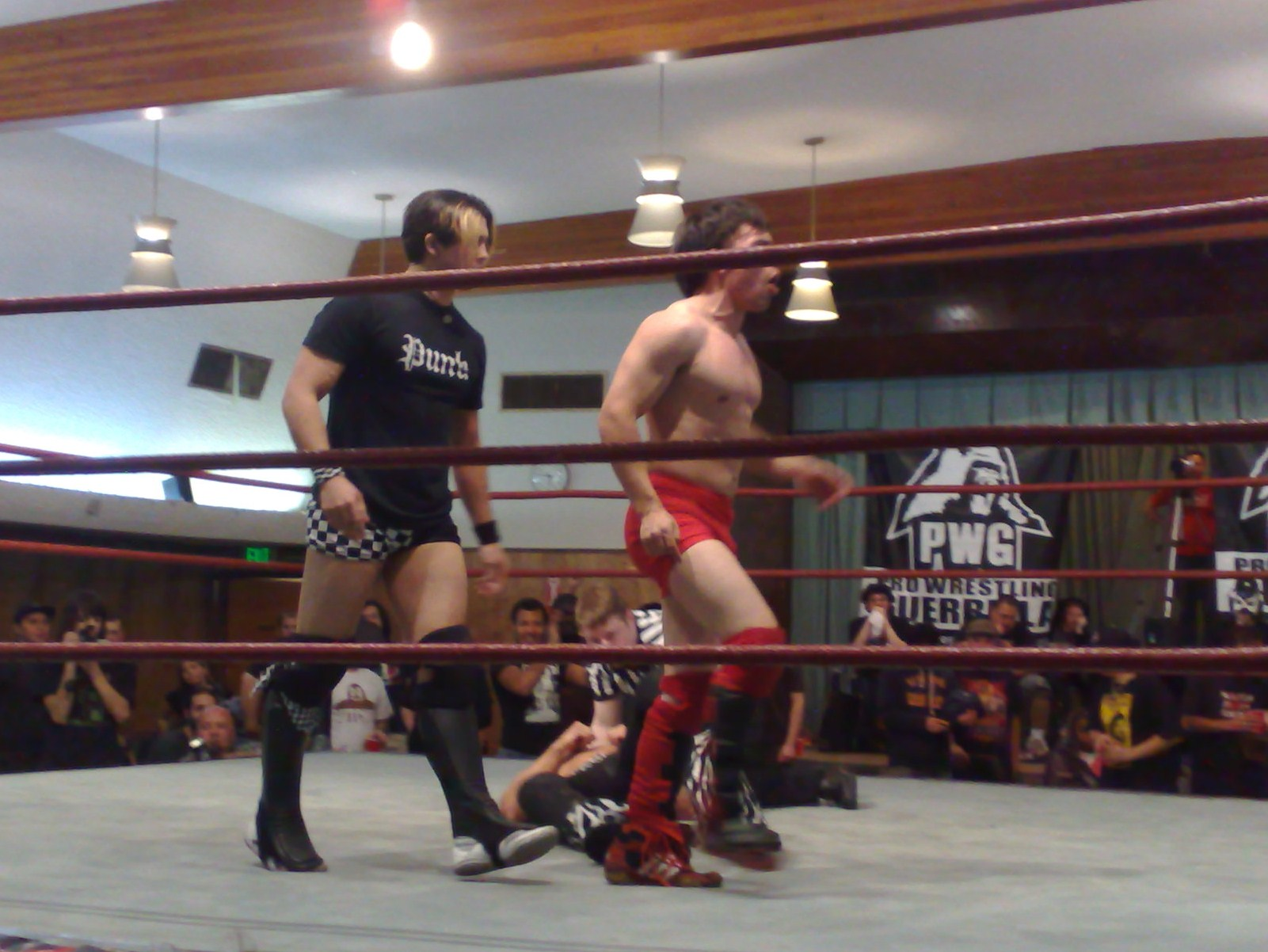
Perkins (left) with regular tag team partner Hook Bomberry in the ring at Pro Wrestling Guerrilla's Scared Straight in 2008

In January 2008 Perkins formed a regular tag team with Hook Bomberry, and the pairing competed in the Dynamite Duumvirate Tag Team Title Tournament round robin qualifier series. At Pearl Habra the team defeated The Young Bucks (Nick and Matt Jackson), but lost their next match to Los Luchas (Phoenix Star and Zokre) at ¡Dia de los Dangerous!. At Scared Straight they defeated Scorpio Sky and Ronin by disqualification, and later in the night Perkins and Bomberry interrupted the match between the Young Bucks and Los Luchas, causing a no contest. This led to a four-way elimination tag team match taking place at 1.21 Gigawatts, which was won by Los Luchas. After the qualifier series Perkins and Bomberry got one last chance to enter the DDT4, facing Scorpio Sky and Ronin once again at It's a Gift.... and a Curse, in a losing effort. Perkins went on to defeat Charles Mercury and Mikey Nicholls and Mark Davis and Ash Riot in tag team matches, before Perkins returned to singles competition. In November, Perkins participated in PWG's Battle of Los Angeles for the first time. He defeated Chuck Taylor in the first round, but was eliminated from the tournament after losing to Bryan Danielson in the second. In January and February 2009, Perkins lost singles matches to both Austin Aries and B-Boy. After moving to Florida in early 2009, Perkins stopped appearing for PWG.

Following a hiatus lasting longer than eighteen months, Perkins returned to PWG at The Perils of Rock N' Roll Decadence in September 2011, losing to Eddie Edwards. He competed regularly for the promotion in 2012 with mixed results. In September, he entered the 2012 Battle of Los Angeles, defeating Joey Ryan in the first round before losing to Sami Callihan in the quarter-finals.

=== Ring of Honor (2003–2012) ===
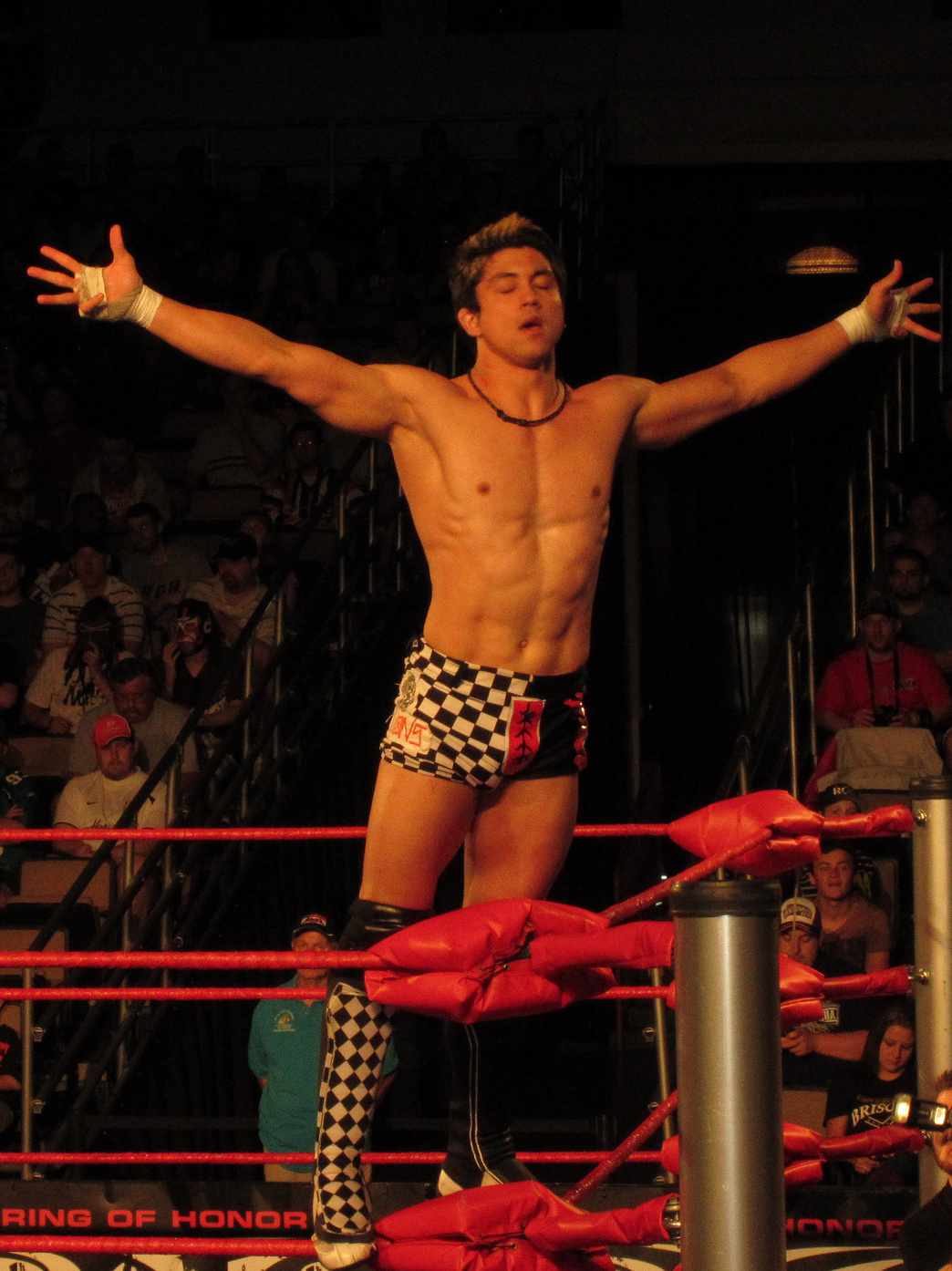
Perkins signed a contract with Ring of Honor in 2011, but asked for his release the following year

Perkins debuted in Ring of Honor (ROH) in December 2003, using the name Puma, and lost to Josh Daniels. Puma returned to ROH in February 2005, losing to Homicide and James Gibson in successive singles matches. His next appearances were in August 2005, where he was on the losing end of a tag team match alongside Jimmy Rave and a singles match against Ricky Reyes. In his next appearance at ROH's Fifth Year Festival: Philly show in February 2007, saw Perkins compete under his real name and lose to Nigel McGuinness. Further losses followed in October 2007, before he gained his first victory in ROH by defeating Kyle O'Reilly at Tag Title Classic II in December 2010. Perkins faced off against Colt Cabana at the Final Battle 2010 internet pay-per-view on December 18, 2010, in which he lost.

In January 2011, Perkins appeared for ROH at their WrestleReunion show Showdown in the Sun II, where he lost to Davey Richards. In March, he lost to Chris Hero and El Generico, before ROH announced that Perkins had signed a contract with the promotion on October 6. He accrued further losses to Jay Briscoe, Jay Lethal, and Mike Bennett in November and December. At the Final Battle 2011 pay-per-view, Perkins lost to Michael Elgin. In March 2012 he appeared at the pay-per-view 10th Anniversary Show, suffering a tag team loss. As part of the Chikara vs. ROH rivalry, Perkins wrestled at Showdown in the Sun, defeating Fire Ant. At Unity, Fire Ant and his allies from The Colony defeated Perkins, Jay Lethal, and Adam Cole in a six-man tag team match. In April, Perkins began a feud with Mike Mondo, defeating him in a singles match before teaming with the All Night Express of Kenny King and Rhett Titus to defeat Mondo and The Young Bucks (Matt and Nick Jackson) at Border Wars. On September 9, 2012, Perkins was released from his ROH contract. He asked for his release, as he felt his ROH contract was restricting other opportunities for him.

=== Total Nonstop Action Wrestling (2004-2016) ===
==== Sporadic appearances (2004–2013) ====
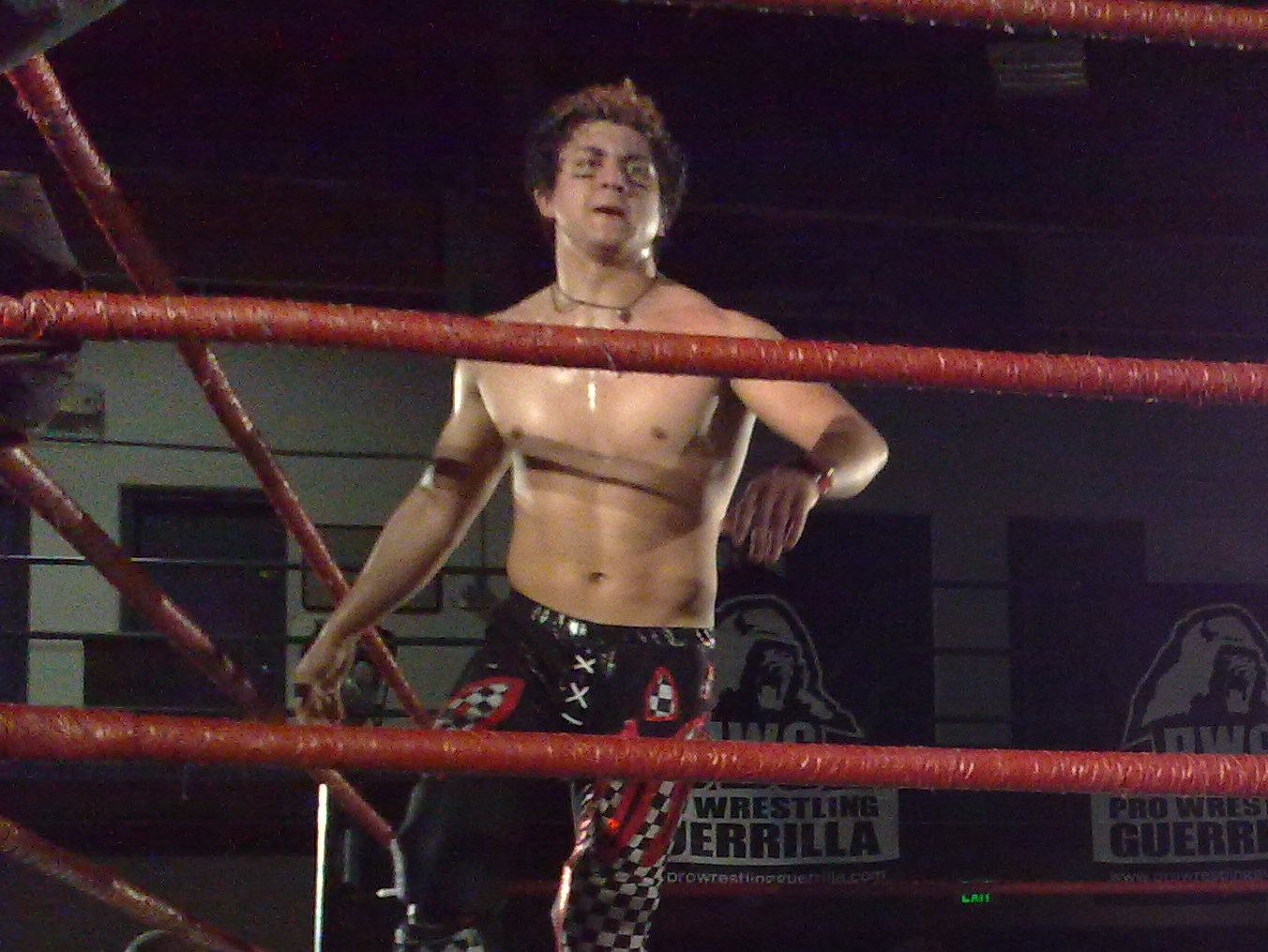
Perkins in 2008

Perkins has also made appearances as Puma with Total Nonstop Action Wrestling, debuting in 2004, when he worked as a jobber in several TNA Xplosion tapings. He was also the first man eliminated in the 2004 Super X-Cup. He participated in a 20-man X-Division gauntlet battle royal at Victory Road, but he was the first man eliminated. Two years later, he returned to TNA as a representative of Japan in an International X-Division Showcase match at Destination X, facing Petey Williams, Chris Sabin, and Sonjay Dutt. The match was ultimately won by Sabin. He also competed in an Xscape match at the following month's Lockdown. Puma was later a member of Team Mexico in the 2006 World X-Cup, alongside Incognito, Magno and Shocker. In that tournament, he lost a second round match to Team USA captain Chris Sabin. Puma was the last man eliminated in the third round gauntlet match, by Team Canada captain Petey Williams. Team Mexico finished third, with four points. In July 2007, Perkins returned to TNA as Puma, wrestling in a 10-man Ultimate X Gauntlet at Victory Road, but was the first man eliminated. He returned at the 2008 Victory Road pay-per-view, representing Team Japan in an elimination match, where he was the second one eliminated.

On September 22, 2009, Perkins, under his Puma gimmick, returned to TNA to wrestle in a dark match, in which he was defeated by Colt Cabana. Perkins worked two more dark matches under the ring name T.J. Perkins during the January 10–12, 2011, tapings of TNA Impact! losing to Shannon Moore and El Generico. In September 2012, Perkins competed as Puma against Zema Ion in a dark match main event of a September taping of Impact!. On January 12, 2013, Perkins, as Puma, took part in the tapings of TNA's One Night Only: X-Travaganza special, wrestling in a seven-man Xscape match, which was won by Christian York.

==== Manik (2013–2016) ====
On May 23, 2013, Perkins wrestled on an episode of Impact Wrestling as Suicide, defeating Petey Williams and Joey Ryan. The win earned him an X Division Championship match against Kenny King and Chris Sabin at Slammiversary XI in an Ultimate X match, which was won by Sabin. On the June 27 episode of Impact Wrestling, Perkins was revealed as the man behind the mask of Suicide as part of a storyline where he had been attacked and the Suicide costume and mask stolen and utilized by Austin Aries to win the X Division Championship.

On June 29, at the tapings of the July 4 episode of Impact Wrestling, Perkins began using the ring name "Manik", while retaining a modified version of the Suicide costume and mask. He participated in a three-way match for the X Division Championship against Sabin and Aries, which Sabin won to regain the championship; Manik was removed from the match after being attacked by the Aces & Eights. After Sabin vacated the championship, Manik entered the tournament to determine the new champion, and advanced to the final by defeating Chavo Guerrero Jr. and Kenny King. On July 18, at the tapings of the July 25 episode of Impact Wrestling, Manik won the vacant X Division Championship by defeating Greg Marasciuolo and Sonjay Dutt in a three-way Ultimate X match. Including a successful defense against Chris Sabin on the September 26 episode of Impact Wrestling, Manik held the championship until Bound for Glory on October 20, when he lost it to Sabin in a five-way Ultimate X match. Following a hiatus lasting several months, Manik returned to the promotion at 2014 Lockdown losing to Tigre Uno in a steel cage match. At Slammiversary, he participated in a Ladder match for the TNA X Division Championship, but lost the match.

On the September 3, 2014, episode of Impact Wrestling, Manik was kidnapped by James Storm and Sanada; the following week, Storm was shown initiating Manik into a new faction, later called "The Revolution", and the trio later attacked Samoa Joe and Homicide, turning heel in the process. At Bound for Glory, Manik wrestled against Minoru Tanaka but lost the match. At Slammiversary, Manik wrestled in a three-way match for the TNA X Division Championship, in a losing effort.

On the September 23, 2015, episode of Impact Wrestling, Manik quit The Revolution and took his mask off, turning face in the process. At Bound for Glory, he participated in an Ultimate X match for the TNA X Division Championship, in a losing effort. During October and November, Manik participated in TNA World Title Series where he defeated Mandrews and DJ Z with the exception of Tigre Uno to gain 6 points, however on the November 25 episode of Impact Wrestling, he unexpectedly ended third of his block when he was pinned by DJ Z before Uno could pin him in the three-way match, thus failing to advance the round of 16. On January 12, 2016, Perkins stated that TNA had given him notice that his contract was not being renewed.

=== Return to NJPW (2011) ===
In late May and early June 2011, Perkins, under the ring name TJP, took part in NJPW's Best of the Super Juniors tournament. After winning three of his eight matches in the round robin stage of the tournament, TJP finished seventh out of the nine wrestlers in his block and did not advance to the semifinals.

=== WWE (2009; 2016–2019) ===
Prior to signing to WWE in 2016, Perkins competed in multiple tryouts for the promotion in 2009. Perkins appeared on the October 19, 2009, episode of Raw; he was scheduled to face The Miz but was replaced by Marty Jannetty before the match as a part of the storyline. The following day Perkins, under the name J.T. Quinn, appeared on ECW in a match against Sheamus. The match resulted in a disqualification after Shelton Benjamin attacked Sheamus. He also wrestled at Florida Championship Wrestling, WWE's developmental territory multiple times that year.

On May 7, 2016, Perkins defeated Fred Yehi at Evolve 61 to qualify for WWE's Cruiserweight Classic tournament. In the tournament he defeated Da Mack in the first round, Johnny Gargano in the second round, Rich Swann in the quarter-finals, Kota Ibushi in the semifinals and Gran Metalik in the finals to win the tournament and become the inaugural WWE Cruiserweight Champion. His entrance paid homage to the Nintendo Entertainment System. Perkins retained the title against Brian Kendrick at Clash of Champions, but lost the title in a rematch at Hell in a Cell after Kendrick faked a knee injury. At Roadblock: End of the Line, Perkins failed to regain the title in a triple threat match against Kendrick and new champion, Rich Swann.

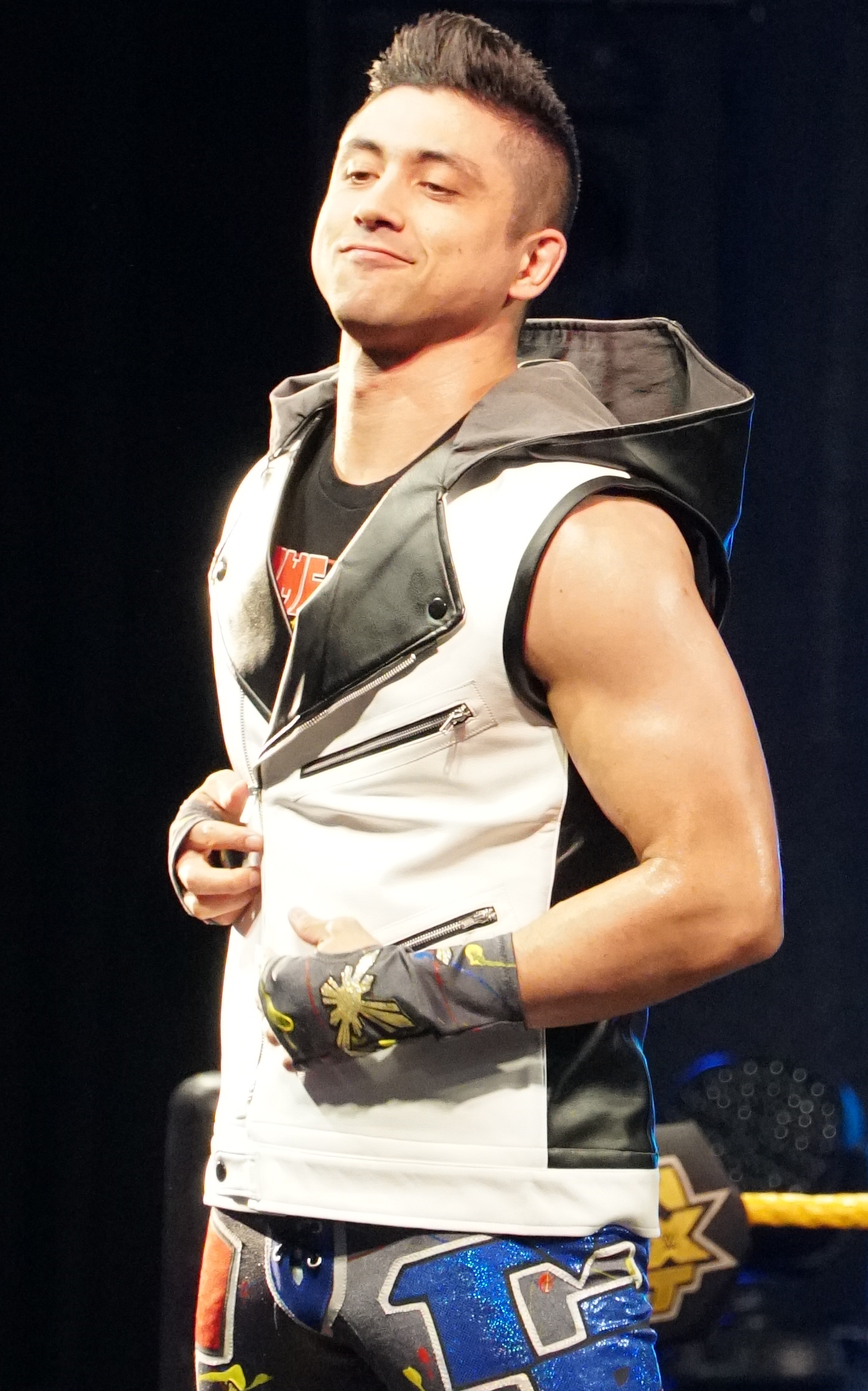
TJP in 2018

Beginning with an attack on Austin Aries on the April 10, 2017, episode of Raw, Perkins formed an alliance with Neville and turned heel, shortening his ring name to "TJP". The alliance ended when Neville attacked TJP on the June 5 episode of Raw. TJP failed to win the Cruiserweight Championship the following night on 205 Live and then took a hiatus in order to rehab his knee. TJP returned on the January 2, 2018, episode of 205 Live. At Royal Rumble, he teamed with Drew Gulak and Jack Gallagher in a losing effort against Gran Metalik, Kalisto and Lince Dorado. On the January 30 episode of 205 Live, TJP defeated Tyler Bate in the first round of the WWE Cruiserweight Championship tournament. He would go on to face eventual winner Cedric Alexander in the quarterfinals on the February 27 episode in a losing effort. TJP appeared again on September 4, challenging Cruiserweight Champion Cedric Alexander in a non-title losing effort. TJP then began feuding with the Lucha House Party, consisting of Kalisto, Metalik and Dorado, forming an alliance with Mike and Maria Kanellis. In February 2019, TJP took part in the Worlds Collide tournament, but was eliminated by Dominik Dijakovic in the first round. On the February 19 episode of 205 Live, TJP was defeated by Humberto Carrillo in what would be his final WWE match in his first run. On February 22, 2019, Perkins was released from his WWE contract, ending his three year tenure with the company.

=== Return to independent circuit (2019–present) ===
On May 3, 2019, Perkins returned to the ring following his release from WWE. In his first match back, he competed for Empire Wrestling Federation in Covina, California. A few days later he would wrestling for Sami Callihan's promotion, The Wrestling Revolver in a triple-threat with Rich Swann and Ace Austin. Following that he would wrestle for various promotions including AAW Wrestling, PCW Ultra and Defy Wrestling. On October 12, 2019, Perkins wrestled for the Philippine Wrestling Revolution against former PWR Champion Jake de Leon in PWR: Homecoming. Perkins won the match after he countered De Leon's submission move into a pinfall win. On November 16, 2019, Perkins appeared at Amazing Red's promotion House of Glory for their "No Limit" event and defeated Mantequilla to win the HOG Crown Jewel Championship.

=== Return to Impact Wrestling (2019–2021) ===
TJP returned to Impact Wrestling on the June 21, 2019, episode of Impact, defeating Ace Austin. TJP made an unannounced appearance at Slammiversary XVII, where he competed in a four-way match, which was won by Willie Mack. In September, he forged an alliance with Fallah Bahh and they began feuding with Michael Elgin. On the March 31, 2020, special episode of Impact, TJP returned as Manik, teaming with Suicide as his two former personas joined to pick up a victory. On the August 18 special episode of Impact, TJP would fail to win the Impact X Division Championship after Rohit Raju pinned the champion Chris Bey. He would then fail to win the championship from Raju at Bound for Glory in a Scramble match and on the November 10 episode of Impact.

At Final Resolution, TJP revived his Manik persona and defeated Raju to win the Impact X Division Championship, using a loophole through a clause that said TJP could not compete for the title as long as Raju was champion. Raju and Chris Bey would attempt to prove that TJP was in fact Manik but all attempts failed. He retained at Hard To Kill despite attempts to unmask him (which he thwarted by simply wearing face paint). TJP lost the title to Ace Austin at Sacrifice, ending his reign at 92 days. He was released by Impact in November 2021, clarifying he had never been signed to the promotion.

=== Second return to NJPW (2019–2025) ===
==== Teaming with LA Dojo (2019–2020) ====
In late July it was announced that Perkins would be wrestling during New Japan Pro-Wrestling's Super J-Cup tournament that would take place during August. He would reach the second round of the tournament after defeating Clark Connors, before being eliminated by El Phantasmo. After the tournament, TJP began teaming with Connors regularly. He would then be booked for the Fighting Spirit Unleashed tour that took place in September. In October, TJP would team with Connors in the Super Junior Tag League tournament, where they lost all but one match, therefore finishing the tournament with 2 points and failing to advance to the finals. Perkins would be booked for the New Beginning in USA tour in January and February. In June, TJP took part in secret TV tapings at NJPW's Los Angeles Dojo for a new show named Lion's Break Collision where he teamed with Karl Fredericks to defeat Jeff Cobb and Rocky Romero. Perkins once again teamed with Connors in the Tag Team Turbulence tournament, however they lost to eventual winners The Good Brothers, in the first round.

==== United Empire (2021–2025) ====
On September 26, TJP joined up with Will Ospreay and joined the United Empire, turning his back on Connors and beginning a feud between the two. The feud ended when Connors defeated TJP. On May 1, 2022, TJP was announced to be competing in the Best of the Super Juniors. He competed in the B-block, ending with a record of 4 wins and 5 losses, resulting in 8 points, therefore failing to advance to the finals. On the finals day, TJP and United Empire stablemate Francesco Akira defeated the IWGP Junior Tag Team Champions Master Wato and Ryusuke Taguchi in a non-title match. On June 20, Perkins and Akira would win the titles.

TJP failed to win more championships, as he was unsuccessful against Stong Openweight Champion Fred Rosser. Back in Japan, TJP and Akira defended the championships against Wato and Taguchi at Burning Spirit. The duo, now going under the name Catch 2/2, defended the titles once more against Los Ingobernables de Japon (Bushi and Titán). In November, the team entered the Super Junior Tag League, although they failed to make it to the final, finishing with 12 points. At Wrestle Kingdom 17, the duo defeated tournament winners Lio Rush and Yoh.

TJP and Akira continued to defend the titles into the new year, defeating Douki and Yoshinobu Kanemaru at The New Beginning in Sapporo in February. In April, the duo lost the titles to Jet Setters (Kushida and Kevin Knight), ending their reign at 311 days. The following month, TJP entered the Best of the Super Juniors 30 tournament, competing in the A Block. TJP finished his campaign with a total of 10 points, failing to advance to the semi-finals. On June 4 at Dominion 6.4 in Osaka-jo Hall, Catch 2/2 regained the IWGP Junior Heavyweight Tag Team Championships in a rematch against Jet Setters. After the match, the duo was confronted by Clark Connors who berated the duo from the entrance ramp, only for the duo to be attacked from behind by United Empire stablemate Dan Moloney, who defected to Bullet Club alongside Connors. Moloney and Connors received their title shot on July 4 on night 1 of NJPW Independence Day, defeating Catch 2/2 to win the titles, ending TJP and Akira's second reign at 30 days.

In August at Multiverse United 2, Catch 2/2 defeated TMDK (Kosei Fujita and Robbie Eagles). In October at Royal Quest III, TJP teamed with United Empire stablemates, Henare and Jeff Cobb in a losing effort to Eddie Kingston, Hiroshi Tanahashi and Michael Oku. Later that month, TJP teamed with Akira once again in the annual Super Junior Tag League, where the duo finished joint top of the block with 12 points, thus advancing to the tournament finals. In the finals, Catch 2/2 defeated House of Torture, to win their first Super Junior Tag League tournament, thus earning an IWGP Junior Heavyweight Tag Team Championship rematch against Connors and Moloney at Wrestle Kingdom 18. Ahead of the match at Wrestle Kingdom, the two teams faced off in NJPW's first ever coffin match, which was won by Bullet Club, after they locked TJP in the coffin. TJP remained out of NJPW programming including being absent at the Wrestle Kingdom 18 press conference. On January 4, 2024, at Wrestle Kingdom 18, TJP returned alongside Akira, wearing a monstrous mask with red eyes and using mist, in reference to the Aswang, which are evil creatures in Filipino folklore. Ultimately at the event, TJP and Akira defeated Bullet Club's Connors and Moloney, to regain the IWGP Junior Heavyweight Tag Team Championships for a third time, only to lose it back to them a month later.

On March 12, 2024, TJP claimed himself as leader the NJPW branch of United Empire due to Ospreay leaving NJPW, but would be pushed back by Great-O-Khan due to the stable losing. On April 22 however, after defeating Just 5 Guys in a gauntlet match, the remaining members fully accepted TJP as the new leader of United Empire.

In April 2025, TJP was quietly removed as leader of United Empire and was replaced by Callum Newman due to TJP becoming a freelancer after his NJPW contract expired, though he was still recognized as a member of the group. On May 9 at Resurgence, TJP teamed with Templario to defeat World Class Wrecking Crew (Royce Isaacs and Jorel Nelson) to win the Strong Openweight Tag Team Championships for the first time. On November 14, 2025, at CMLL Viernes Espectacular, TJP and Templario lost the Strong Openweight Tag team Championship to Los Hermanos Chavez (Ángel de Oro and Niebla Roja), marking TJP's final appearance as part of United Empire.

=== Return to MLW (2019–2022, 2024) ===
In December 2019, MLW announced that TJP would be returning for the company for the first time since 2004, as a part of the Opera Cup tournament on December 5, 2019. His return match was in the opening round of the Opera Cup against Brian Pillman Jr. in a losing effort. TJP returned to MLW, the following year for the Opera Cup, in which he lost to Richard Holliday in the opening round on the November 25 episode of Fusion. During 2021 he got an opportunity at the MLW World Tag Team Championships with Bu Ku Dao but failed to win them. In November, in his third participation in the Opera Cup, he reached the final, however, losing to Davey Richards. In 2022 he will also challenge the MLW world middleweight champion, Myron Reed, among others. In 2024, he appeared in the Opera Cup tournament again, as an "injury" alternate for Davey Boy Smith Jr. He won a quarterfinals match against "Filthy" Tom Lawlor only to lose a semifinals match to KENTA.

=== Return to CMLL (2021–2025) ===
In October 2021 he returns to CMLL for the first time since 2008, fighting in some tag team matches among others with his United Empire partner, Jeff Cobb. In November he gets a match for Volador Jr.'s NWA World Historic Welterweight Championship. TJP returned to CMLL in August 2023 to participate in the CMLL International Gran Prix in Team International. On November 14, 2025, at CMLL Viernes Espectacular, TJP and Templario lost the Strong Openweight Tag team Championship to Los Hermanos Chavez (Ángel de Oro and Niebla Roja).

=== Return to WWE and Lucha Libre AAA Worldwide (2025–present) ===
In October 2025, Perkins served as a guest coach at the WWE Performance Center.

Perkins, reprising his role as TJP, made his in-ring return to the WWE after a six-year absence, under the Lucha Libre AAA Worldwide (AAA) banner which the WWE acquired the promotion in 2025, debuting on the January 31, 2026 episode of AAA on FOX, where he won a number one contender's match against Chris Carter, Mini Vinkingo and Elio LeFleur, earning an AAA World Cruiserweight Championship match, but failed to win the title a month later against Laredo Kid.

=== Second return to TNA (2026) ===
TJP returned to TNA, formerly known as Impact Wrestling, at Destination X on November 15, 2026, competing in the men's Ultimate X match to determine the number one contender for the TNA X Division Championship, which was won by KC Navarro.

== Personal life ==
Perkins is a fan of Kobe Bryant. After his death in 2020, Perkins began using a new finisher named the Mamba Splash in honor of him.

During the Speaking Out Movement in 2020, Perkins came out with his own allegations of being sexually abused by older female wrestlers at age fifteen.

Perkins is married to fellow professional wrestler Aria Blake. The couple welcomed their first child on August 26, 2021, a boy named James Theodore.

In 2023, Perkins' wife announced on her social media that the couple are expecting another child. They welcomed another son, Noah Nikolas, in December of the same year.

== Other media ==
As TJP, he made his video game debut as a playable character in WWE 2K18 and also appears in WWE 2K19.

== Championships and accomplishments ==
- Adrenaline Championship Wrestling
  - King of Maryland Tournament (2019)
- All Pro Wrestling
  - APW Worldwide Internet Championship (1 time)
- Alternative Wrestling Show
  - AWS Light Heavyweight Championship (2 times)
- Big Time Wrestling
  - BTW Cruiserweight Championship (1 time)
- Consejo Mundial de Lucha Libre
  - Best New Sensation (2003)
  - Feud of the Year (2003)
- Relentless Wrestling
  - Relentless Heavyweight Championship (2 time)
- Empire Wrestling Federation
  - EWF Heavyweight Championship (1 time)
  - EWF Tag Team Championship (1 time) – with Liger Rivera
- Evolve Wrestling
  - Breakout Match (2010) vs. Munenori Sawa on January 16
- Gleat
  - G-Infinity Championship (1 time) – with G. Sharpe
- High Risk Wrestling
  - HRW Hi-Desert Championship (1 time)
- House of Glory
  - HOG Crown Jewel Championship (1 time)
- Mach One Wrestling
  - NWA Heritage Championship (1 time)
- New Japan Pro-Wrestling
  - Strong Openweight Tag Team Championship (1 time) – with Templario
  - IWGP Junior Heavyweight Tag Team Championship (3 times) – with Francesco Akira
  - Super Jr. Tag League (2023) – with Francesco Akira
  - American Young Lions Cup Tournament (2004)
- New Tradition Lucha Libre
  - NTLL Gladiator Championship (1 time)
- Power Precision Pro Wrestling
  - 3PWA Tag Team Championship (1 time) – with Damian Blade
- Pro Wrestling Illustrated
  - Ranked No. 35 of the top 500 singles wrestlers in the PWI 500 in 2017
- SoCal Uncensored
  - Rookie of the Year (2001)
- Total Nonstop Action Wrestling/Impact Wrestling
  - TNA/Impact X Division Championship (2 times)
  - TNA X Division Championship Tournament (2013)
  - Impact Year End Awards (1 time)
    - Men's Match of the Year (2021) vs. Josh Alexander on June 3 at BTI
- Toy Wrestling Organisation
  - T.W.O World Championship (2 time)
- United Independent Wrestling Alliance
  - UIWA Lightweight Championship (1 time)
- UWA Hardcore Wrestling
  - UWA Canadian Heavyweight Championship (1 time)
- World Power Wrestling
  - Best in the World Tournament (2006)
- World Series Wrestling
  - WSW Australian Championship (1 time)
- WWE
  - WWE Cruiserweight Championship (1 time, inaugural)
  - Cruiserweight Classic (2016)
