= Unified Tag Team Championship =

Unified Tag Team Championship may refer to any of the following professional wrestling tag team championships:

- Unified Tag Team Championship, the top tag team championships currently defended in All Pro Wrestling and Vendetta Pro Wrestling
- Unified World Tag Team Championship (AJPW), the top tag team championship that is currently defended in All Japan Pro Wrestling
- Unified WWE Tag Team Championship, the top tag team championship that was defended in World Wrestling Entertainment, now known as the WWE Raw Tag Team Championship
