= Universal Championship =

Universal Championship may refer to:

- APW Universal Heavyweight Championship, the top championship of All Pro Wrestling
- WWC Universal Heavyweight Championship, the world championship of World Wrestling Council
- WWE Universal Championship, the former world championship of WWE's SmackDown brand
- DDT Universal Championship, a championship of DDT Pro-Wrestling
