= Stampede Wrestling Pacific Heavyweight Championship =

Professional wrestling championship

Stampede Pacific Heavyweight Championship

Details
- Promotion: Stampede Wrestling
- Date established: May 1999
- Date retired: Uncertain
Statistics
- First champion: Greg Pawluk
- Final champion: Michael Modest

The Stampede Pacific Heavyweight Championship was a professional wrestling title, the first secondary title to be created following the reopening of Stampede Wrestling in 1999. The title was defended over a two-year period before being abandoned in late 2001. Title defenses were held primarily in Alberta as well in the United States and Japan. There have been a total of four recognized champions who have had a combined five official reigns.

== Title history ==
Key
No.	The overall championship reign
Reign	The reign number for the specific wrestler listed.
Event	The event promoted by the respective promotion in which the title changed hands
N/A	The specific information is not known
—	Used for vacated reigns in order to not count it as an official reign

No.	Champion	Reign	Date	Days held	Location	Event	Notes	Ref(s)
1	Greg Pawluk	1	May 10, 1999	(Note: The exact date Pawluk was awarded the championship is uncertain, putting his title reign at between 86 and 65 days.)	Milwaukee, Wisconsin	House show	Awarded title by Commissioner Bruce Hart.	
2	Jason Neidhart	1	August 5, 1999	37	New York, New York	House show		
3	Greg Pawluk	2	September 10, 1999	234	Carstairs, Alberta, Canada	House show		
4	Sabu	1	May 10, 2000	(Note: The length of Sabu's reign is too uncertain to calculate.)	Saitama, Japan	House show		
—	Vacated	—	June 20, 2001	—	N/A	N/A	Championship vacated for undocumented reasons	
5	Michael Modest	1	June 27, 2001	(Note: The date the championship was abandoned is unknown which means that the length of Modest's reign is too uncertain to calculate.)	Drumheller, Alberta	House show	Defeated Bruce Hart to win the vacant title.	
—	Abandoned	—	May 10, 2002	—	N/A	N/A	Championship was abandoned	
