= APW Worldwide Internet Championship =

Professional wrestling championship

Details
- Promotion: All Pro Wrestling
- Date established: February 27, 1999
- Date retired: September 27, 2019
Statistics
- First champion: Michael Modest
- Final champion: Levi Shapiro
- Most reigns: Rik Luxury (5 times)
- Longest reign: Will Cuevas (371 days)
- Shortest reign: Tito Aquino (<1 day)

The APW Worldwide Internet Championship was a professional wrestling championship created and promoted by the independent professional wrestling promotion All Pro Wrestling.

== Title history ==
As of October 19, 2026, there have been 53 reigns between 39 champions with six vacancies. Michael Modest was the inaugural champion. Rik Luxury has the most reigns with five. Levi Shapiro's was the final Champion and Tito Aquino's reign is the shortest at 1 hour.

Levi Shapiro was the final champion in his first reign. He defeated Will Hobbs at Bay Area Bash on June 15, 2019, in Daly City, CA.

Key
No.	Overall reign number
Reign	Reign number for the specific champion
Days	Number of days held
<1	Reign lasted less than a day
+	Current reign is changing daily

No.	Champion	Championship change			Reign statistics		Notes	Ref.
No.	Champion	Date	Event	Location	Reign	Days	Notes	Ref.
1	Michael Modest	February 27, 1999	Spartanfest '99	Pinole, CA	1	308	Defeated Tony Jones in the finals of the APW Cup Tournament to become the inaugural champion.	
2	Christopher Daniels	January 1, 2000	Y2Kaos Weekend - Night 2	Lompoc, CA	1	105		
—	Vacated	N/A	—	—	—	—		
3	Donovan Morgan	April 15, 2000	Farewell To Modest - Worldwide Internet Tournament	Livingston, CA	1	196	Defeated Boyce LeGrande in a tournament final to win the vacant title. Morgan also held the APW Universal Heavyweight Championship in conjunction with the APW World Wide Internet Championship.	
—	Vacated	N/A	—	Galt, CA	—	—	APW Commissioner Gabe Ramirez stripped Morgan of the title because he also held the Universal Heavyweight Championship. Ramirez declared a one-night tournament was to be held to crown a new champion.	
4	Vinny Massaro	October 28, 2000	Halloween Hell IV	Galt, CA	1	203	Defeated Christopher Daniels in a one-night tournament to win the vacant title.	
5	Donovan Morgan	May 19, 2001	King City Kaos	King City, CA	2	300		
—	Vacated	N/A	—	—	—	—	Morgan vacated the title upon leaving the promotion.	
6	Jardi Frantz	March 15, 2002	Gym Wars The Return	Hayward, CA	1	56	This was a 19-man battle royal for the vacant title.	
7	Super Dragon	May 10, 2002	Gym Wars	Hayward, CA	1	37		
8	Bryan Danielson	June 16, 2002	EPIC International Collision	Los Angeles, CA	1	54		
9	Larry Blackwell	August 9, 2002	Gym Wars	Hayward, CA	1	105	A set up by the Blackout Army falsified a "match" in order to give Kryptonite the Internet title.	
10	Kryptonite	November 22, 2002	APW	Hayward, CA	1	35		
—	Vacated	N/A	—	Hayward, CA	—	—	Kryptonite was stripped of the title due to injury.	
11	Super Dragon	December 27, 2002	Kristmas Kaos	Hayward, CA	2	57	Defeated Bobby Quance and Jardi Frantz in a triple threat 60-minute Iron Man match.	
12	James Choi	February 22, 2003	Gym Wars	Hayward, CA	1	175	Defeated Excalibur, who wrestled in place of Super Dragon, who was in Japan.	
13	B-Boy	August 16, 2003	LA Nemesis II	Santa Clarita, CA	1	210		
14	J.J. Perez	March 13, 2004	The Garage Rumble	Hayward, CA	1	266		
15	Puma	December 4, 2004	Kristmas Kaos	Hayward, CA	1	217		
16	J.J. Perez	July 9, 2005	APW	Hayward, CA	2	420		
17	Mr. Primetime	September 2, 2006	APW	Hayward, CA	1	203		
18	Psicosis	March 24, 2007	March Madness	Bakersfield, CA	1	91		
19	Mr. Primetime	June 23, 2007	Summer Sizzle	Bakersfield, CA	2	49	This was a 2-out-of-3 falls match.	
20	Adam Thornstowe	August 11, 2007	Gym Wars	Hayward, CA	1	63	This was a 2-out-of-3 falls match.	
21	Tito Aquino	October 13, 2007	Halloween Hell X	Hayward, CA	1	<1	Defeated Thornstowe, Mr. Prime Time and Oliver John in a No Disqualification Falls Count Anywhere Triple Threat match.	
22	Dana Lee	October 13, 2007	Halloween Hell X	Hayward, CA	1	136		
23	Brian Cage	February 26, 2008	Gym Wars	Hayward, CA	1	60		
—	Vacated	April 26, 2008	—	Hayward, CA	—	—	Cage was stripped of the title when he was unable to wrestle due to a family emergency.	
24	Derek Sanders	June 16, 2008	Gym Wars	Hayward, CA	1	128	Defeated Nate Rulez in a tournament final to win the vacant title.	
25	Jeckles the Jester	November 1, 2008	Halloween Hell XI	Hayward, CA	1	63		
26	Timothy Thatcher	January 3, 2009	Gym Wars	Hayward, CA	1	378	Mr. Wrestling #4 defeated Thatcher for the title on 10/24/09. Days later, the APW Board of Directors overturned the decision, ruling that the direct outcome was due to the physical involvement of special referee Omega, and Thatcher was reinstated as champion.	
27	Dave Dutra	January 16, 2010	Gym Wars	Hayward, CA	1	210		
28	Mr. Wrestling #4	August 14, 2010	Gym Wars	Hayward, CA	1	63		
29	Matt Carlos	October 16, 2010	Halloween Hell XIII	Hayward, CA	1	202		
30	Rik Luxury	May 6, 2011	Gym Wars	Hayward, CA	1	162	Luxury won a ladder match for both Carlos' APW World Wide Internet Championship & Luxury's "Real" World Wide Internet Championship.	
31	Colt Cabana	October 15, 2011	Halloween Hell XIV	Hayward, CA	1	168	Luxury issued an open challenge immediately after retaining the title at Halloween Hell XIV, answered by Cabana.	
32	Rik Luxury	February 18, 2012	N/A	Hayward, CA	2	56		
33	Will Rood	April 14, 2012	Gym Wars	Hayward, CA	1	21		
34	Rik Luxury	May 5, 2012	Gym Wars - Young Lions Cup	Hayward, CA	3	98		
35	Perry Von Vicious	August 11, 2012	Gym Wars	Hayward, CA	1	63		
36	Rik Luxury	October 13, 2012	Halloween Hell XV	Hayward, CA	4	21		
37	Will Rood	November 3, 2012	Gym Wars	Hayward, CA	2	163		
38	Dave Dutra	April 15, 2013	Vendetta Pro Casino Royale	Las Vegas, NV	2	77	Title defended at Vendetta Pro Wrestling's "Casino Royale" event at the 48th annual Cauliflower Alley Club reunion.	
—	Vacated	July 1, 2013	—	Hayward, CA	—	—	Dutra was stripped of the title after refusing to defend the title against number one contender Drake Younger without him first submitting to a blood test because of Younger's death match history.	
40	Drake Younger	July 6, 2013	Gym Wars	Hayward, CA	1	119	With the title held in escrow Younger defeated Timothy Thatcher at Gym Wars to become the new champion. Dave Dutra returned with the original belt and challenged Younger to a unification ladder match. Younger was victorious against Dutra in the main event of Halloween Hell.	
41	Billy Blade	November 2, 2013	Young Lions Cup	Hayward, CA	1	6	Blade made a surprise return at the Young Lions Cup and challenged Younger immediately following a No DQ title defense against Dalton Frost.	
42	Jeckles The Jester	November 8, 2013	Roland Alexander Memorial Show	Hayward, CA	2	217	This was a four-way elimination match, which also involving Billy Blade and Drake Younger.	
43	Chris Hero	June 13, 2014	Friday The 13th	San Francisco, CA	1	85		
44	Virgil Flynn	September 6, 2014	War At The Shore	San Francisco, CA	1	188	This was a three-way match, which also involving Jeckles The Jester.	
45	Boyce LeGrande	March 13, 2015	Friday The 13th Part 2	San Francisco, CA	1	182	This was a four-way match, which also involving Marcus Lewis and Truex.	
46	Will Cuevas	September 11, 2015	Bayshore Bash	Daly City, CA	1	371		
47	Rik Luxury	September 16, 2016	N/A	Daly City, CA	5	56		
48	Will Cuevas	November 11, 2016	11:11	Pacifica, CA	2	176		
49	Karl Fredericks	May 6, 2017	Cow Palace Royale	Daly City, CA	1	188		
50	Jacob Fatu	November 10, 2017	Clash At The Cow Palace	Daly City, CA	1	224		
51	JR Kratos	June 22, 2018	Bay Area Bash	Daly City, CA	1	133		
52	Will Hobbs	November 2, 2018	Halloween Hell	Daly City, CA	3	225	Previously known as Will Rood	
53	Levi Shapiro	June 15, 2019	Bay Area Bash	Daly City, CA	1	104		
—	Retired	September 27, 2023	—	—			The title was retired.	

== Combined reigns ==
As of October 19, 2026.

Rank	Wrestler	No. of reigns	Combined days
1	J.J. Perez	2	686
2	Will Cuevas	2	557
3	Donovan Morgan	2	496
4	Rik Luxury	5	446
5	Will Rood / Will Hobbs	3	409
6	Timothy Thatcher	1	378
7	Karl Fredericks	1	355
8	Michael Modest	1	308
9	Dave Dutra	2	287
10	Jeckles the Jester	2	275
11	Mr. Prime Time	2	252
12	Jacob Fatu	1	224
13	Puma	1	217
14	B-Boy	1	210
15	Vinny Massaro	1	203
16	Matt Carlos	1	202
17	Virgil Flynn	1	176
18	Boyce LeGrande	1	172
19	James Choi	1	175
20	Colt Cabana	1	168
21	Drake Younger	1	145
22	Dana Lee	1	136
23	JR Kratos	1	133
24	Derek Sanders	1	128
25	Christopher Daniels	2	105
25	Larry Blackwell	2	105
26	Levi Shapiro	1	104
27	Super Dragon	2	94
28	Chris Hero	1	92
29	Psicosis	1	91
30	Adam Thornstowe	3	63
31	Mr. Wrestling #4	3	63
32	Perry Von Vicious	3	63
33	Brian Cage	1	60
34	Jardi Frantz	1	56
35	Bryan Danielson	1	54
36	Kryptonite	1	35
37	Billy Blade	1	6
38	Tito Aquino	1	<1

== See also ==
- APW Tag Team Championship
- APW Universal Heavyweight Championship
