= Jason Neidhart =

Canadian professional wrestler

Personal information
- Born: Jason Anderson; 16 December 1965 (age 60) Calgary, Alberta, Canada

Professional wrestling career
- Ring name(s): Blackheart Destruction; Jason Anderson; Jason Neidhart; Jason the Rebel; Jud Jeet Singh; Sledge Hammer; Super Bat
- Billed height: 5 ft 10 in (178 cm)
- Billed weight: 242 ln
- Trained by: Gama Singh
- Debut: 1988
- Retired: 2016

Jason Anderson (born 16 December 1965) is a Canadian professional wrestler. He is best known for his work in Stampede Wrestling, where he was known under the ring names Blackheart Destruction and Jason Neidhart, being portrayed as the cousin of wrestler Jim Neidhart. He would wrestle internationally.

== Professional wrestling career ==
Neidhart started his pro wrestling career in 1988 in Calgary for Stampede Wrestling as Jason Anderson. In 1989, he became Blackheart Destruction teaming with Blackheart Apocalypse (Tom Nash) as the Blackhearts. They feuded with Chris Benoit and Biff Wellington in Stampede.

On 8 July 1991 he wrestled for WWF "Wrestling Challenge" losing to Ted DiBiase which aired on 4 August.

In 1993, Neidhart was Jud Jeet Singh, billed from India in the independent promotions in Calgary. In 1994, he wrestled in South Africa as Jason the Rebel for Maharaj Promotion. In 1996, he became Jason Neidhart and grew a long goatee portraying Jim Neidhart. In 1997, he made his debut in Germany for Catch Wrestling Association (CWA) teaming with Cannonball Grizzly and Robbie Brookside.

He lost to Duke Droese on 18 January 1998 in Mombasa, Kenya.

Neidhart appeared on World Championship Wrestling's WCW Worldwide taping on 30 March 1999 losing to Scott Norton in Kitchener, Ontario. That same year he returned to both Germany and Calgary.

In 2001, he worked for New Japan Pro Wrestling as Sledgehammer. During Neidhart's career he travelled to England, Philippines, Hungary, Austria, Lebanon, Abu Dhabi and Saudi Arabia.

In 2009, he worked in Egypt where he lost to Al Snow and Gangrel. From 2013 to 2015, Neidhart wrestled in Qatar. In 2016, he wrestled in Sudan. That same year, he returned to Edmonton and retired from wrestling.

== Championships and accomplishments ==
- Prairie Wrestling Alliance
  - PWA Championship
- Western Canada Extreme Wrestling
  - WCEW Extreme Heavyweight Champion (as Sledge Hammer)
- Stampede Wrestling
  - Stampede International Tag Team Championship (1 times) - (as Blackheart Destruction) with Blackheart Apocalypse
  - Stampede Pacific Heavyweight Championship (1 time) (as Jason Neidhart)
- Canadian Wrestling Hall of Fame
  - Class of 2000
- Tri-State Wrestling Alliance
  - TWA Tag Team Championship (1 time) – with Blackheart Apocalypse
