= Steve Rizzono =

American professional wrestler

Personal information
- Born: Steve Coombs; 1970 (age 55–56) Camden, New Jersey, US

Professional wrestling career
- Ring name: Steve Rizzono
- Billed height: 6 ft 2 in (1.88 m)
- Billed weight: 245 lb (111 kg)
- Billed from: California
- Trained by: APW Boot Camp
- Debut: March 29, 1995
- Retired: October 18, 2003

Steve Coombs (born 1970) is a former professional wrestler best known for his stint in Xtreme Pro Wrestling. Coombs competed primarily as "The Gigolo" Steve Rizzono. At one time, Rizzono was also a bouncer and a personal trainer.

== Professional wrestling career ==
Steve Rizzono trained alongside Spike Dudley at All Pro Wrestling's school, and made his debut on March 29, 1995, teaming with Mike Modest against Robert Thompson and Mike Diamond. While competing in APW, he captured the APW Tag Team titles with Mike Modest and Tony Jones. He also won a famous three-way dance that featured Vic Grimes and Erin O' Grady. On January 22, 1996 in Stockton, CA, Rizzono made his World Wrestling Federation debut in a losing effort to Justin "Hawk" Bradshaw. The following night in Oakland, Rizzono jobbed to Duke "The Dumpster" Droese in a match that was featured on the WWF Superstars TV program.

On the weekend of ECW’s November to Remember 1997 pay-per-view, Rizzono had a match with Robert Thompson on an APW show. Wrestling Observer journalist Dave Meltzer attended both shows. A few weeks later, Meltzer wrote in the observer that Rizzono's match with Thompson was better than almost anything he saw on the ECW event. In between his APW stint and his early 2000 entrance into XPW, Rizzono wrestled in the United States Wrestling Association and for independent promotions based in the Portland area. In Portland, Rizzono was managed by Jonny Fairplay.

Upon joining XPW, Rizzono initially had a partnership with Kid Kaos, but it quickly escalated into a bitter rivalry. At one point, Rizzono was managed by "Playboy" Buddy Rose, in an unsuccessful journey after the XPW World Heavyweight Championship. During his early tenure, he had matches against Public Enemy, John Kronus, and Juventud Guerrera. He was a member of The Black Army, and (following his banishment from the Army) founded The Enterprise with manager and porn star Veronica Caine, in order to avenge the rejection from his former teammates. Besides feuding with the Black Army, Rizzono feuded heavily with Pogo the Clown, as Rizzono was usually privy to receiving harsh beatings from Pogo. Their feud was featured in two (2001 and 2002) of XPW's annual King of the Deathmatch Tournaments, as both matches began as singles matches, but soon turned into triple threat matches midway through. In both bouts, Rizzono fell victim to brutal and memorable beatings from his nemesis, which resulted in Rizzono savagely losing in both of his appearances. Rizzono departed from XPW in mid-2002 when XPW relocated its operations to the Pennsylvania area on the East Coast.

Rizzono returned to APW on November 8, 2002 as a trainer, a commentator, and a manager before leaving the business. He currently resides in California and he has health problems due to the severe injuries he incurred in XPW, including multiple concussions and broken noses as a result of death matches in which he participated. On July 18, 2007, Steve received spinal surgery in which two ligaments were removed from his spine.

== Championships and accomplishments ==
- All Pro Wrestling

- APW Tag Team Championship (2 times) – with Mike Modest (1) and Tony Jones (1)

- NWA: Extreme Canadian Championship Wrestling

- NWA/ECCW Tag Team Championship (1 time) – with Chance Beckett
- NWA/ECCW Vancouver Island Heavyweight Championship (1 time)

== Media ==
- Video and DVD appearances

- XPW: After the Fall. Perf. Steve Rizzono. DVD. Big Vision Entertainment, 2006.
- XPW: Retribution. Perf. Steve Rizzono. DVD. Xtreme Pro Wrestling, 2003.
- XPW: Best of XPW TV, Vol. 1. Perf. Steve Rizzono. DVD. Xtreme Pro Wrestling, 2003.
- XPW: Best of The Enterprise. Perf. Steve Rizzono. DVD. Xtreme Pro Wrestling, 2002.
- XPW Class-X Presents: XPW Baptized in Blood, Vol. 1 & 2. Perf. Steve Rizzono. DVD. Big Vision Entertainment, 2007.
- XPW Class-X Presents: XPW TV The Complete First Season. Perf. Steve Rizzono. DVD. Big Vision Entertainment, 2007.
- XPW: New Year's Revolution. Perf. Steve Rizzono. DVD. Xtreme Pro Wrestling, 2002.
- XPW: Blown To Hell. Perf. Steve Rizzono. DVD. Xtreme Pro Wrestling, 2002.

- XPW: Liberty or Death. Perf. Steve Rizzono. DVD. Xtreme Pro Wrestling, 2002.

- XPW: Baptized In Blood 2. Perf. Steve Rizzono. DVD. Xtreme Pro Wrestling, 2002.
- XPW: Baptized In Blood 3: Night of Champions. Perf. Steve Rizzono. DVD. Xtreme Pro Wrestling, 2002.
- XPW: Free Fall. Perf. Steve Rizzono. DVD. Xtreme Pro Wrestling, 2002.
- XPW: Genocide. Perf. Steve Rizzono. DVD. Xtreme Pro Wrestling, 2002.
- XPW: Best of The Black Army. Perf. Steve Rizzono. DVD. Xtreme Pro Wrestling, 2002.
- XPW: Damage Inc.. Perf. Steve Rizzono. DVD. Xtreme Pro Wrestling, 2001.
- XPW: Redemption. Perf. Steve Rizzono. DVD. Xtreme Pro Wrestling, 2001.
- XPW: Go Funk Yourself. Perf. Steve Rizzono. DVD. Xtreme Pro Wrestling, 2001.
- XPW: We Wrestle. Perf. Steve Rizzono. VHS. Xtreme Pro Wrestling, 2001.

- Film and television appearances

- Nash Bridges. CBS. Jan. 2001.
- Obscenery. Executive Producer Melissa Wegman. ClearVision Media Production Group. XPW archive footage appearance.
- "Pornographer runs for Los Angeles mayor." Extra TV. Syndication. July 2000. "XPW archive footage appearance."
