= Reno Scum =

Professional wrestling tag team

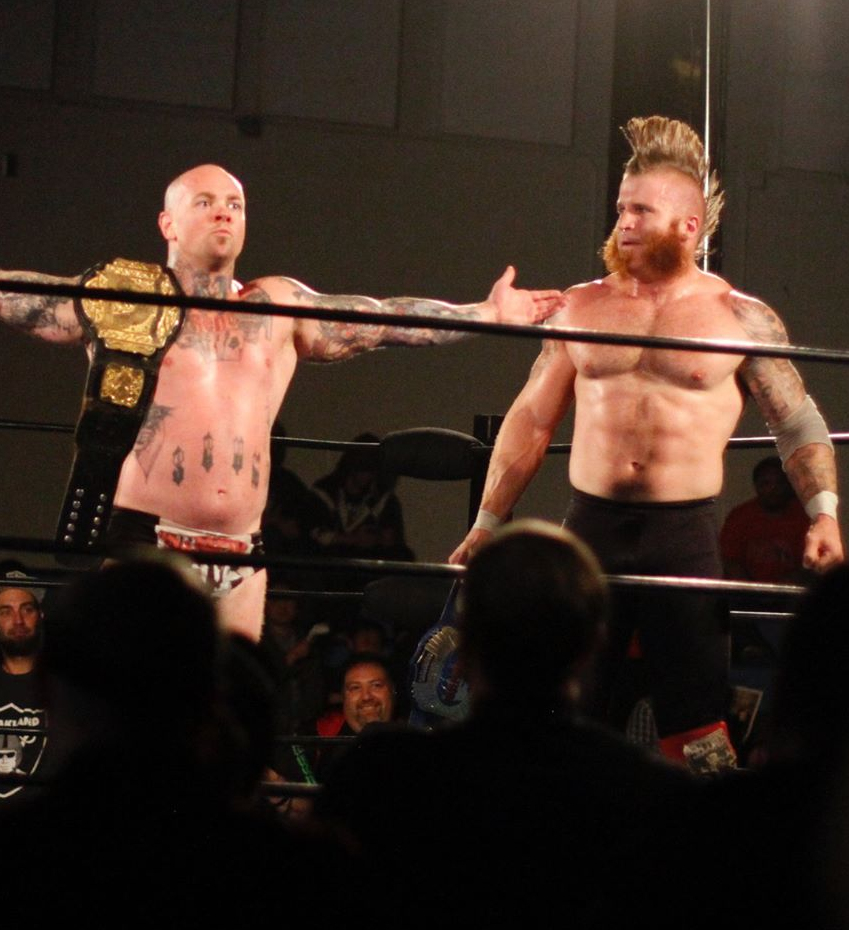
- Adam Thornstowe (left) and Luster the Legend (right)

Tag team
- Members: Adam Thornstowe; Luster the Legend
- Name: Reno Scum
- Billed heights: Luster: 6 ft 4 in (1.93 m); Thornstowe: 5 ft 9 in (1.75 m)
- Combined billed weight: Luster: 246 lb (112 kg); Thornstowe: 214 lb (97 kg)
- Billed from: Reno, Nevada
- Former members: Paul Isadora; Shane Dynasty; Christina Von Eerie
- Debut: October 13, 2007
- Years active: 2007–present

Reno Scum are an American professional wrestling tag team consisting of Adam Thornstowe and Luster the Legend. They are known for their work on the independent circuit and are best friends in real life. Best known for their time in Impact Wrestling, they've also formerly worked for Ring of Honor (ROH) and the original Global Force Wrestling. Though best known as a tag team, Reno Scum has also been a stable, which included, in addition to Luster and Thornstowe, Christina Von Eerie, Paul Isadora and Shane Dynasty. Scum has been said to stand for Socially Corrupt Underground Militia.

== Professional wrestling career ==
=== Global Force Wrestling (2015–2017) ===
On July 24, 2015, Reno Scum made their debut for Jeff Jarrett's promotion Global Force Wrestling (GFW) where they participated in a tournament to crown the inaugural GFW Tag Team Champions, defeating Los Luchas in the quarterfinals. On October 23, 2015, Reno Scum defeated Tease 'N Sleaze (Jacob Austin Young and Joey Ryan) in the semifinals and in the same night they advanced to the finals losing to The Bollywood Boyz for the GFW Tag Team Championship.

=== Ring of Honor (2015–2016, 2019) ===
The Reno Scum made their Ring of Honor (ROH) debut in the dark match of the ROH 13th Anniversary Show PPV event, where they were defeated by Adam Page and Jimmy Jacobs. On February 27, 2016, Reno Scum made their Ring of Honor televised debut losing to former ROH World Tag Team Champions The Briscoe Brothers (Jay Briscoe and Mark Briscoe).

Reno Scum made a one-off return during ROH's March 16, 2019 television tapings at Sam's Town Hotel and Gambling Hall in Las Vegas, losing to The Bouncers.

=== Impact Wrestling (2017, 2019–2021) ===
On the March 9, 2017 edition of Impact Wrestling, Reno Scum defeated the DCC (Kingston and Bram) in their debut match for Impact Wrestling. Reno Scum was unsuccessful at winning the Impact Wrestling World Tag Team Championship in a fatal four way tag team match which was won by The Latin American Xchange (Santana and Ortiz). On April 19, TNA announced that Adam Thornstowe suffered a torn bicep injury. On October 27, 2017 after months of inactivity it was reported that they had been officially released from Impact Wrestling.

Reno Scum returned as enhancement talent putting over the team of KM and Fallah Bahh in a pair of matches during Impact's February 15–17, 2019 television tapings at Las Vegas' Sam's Town Hotel and Gambling Hall. The first encounter aired on March 1 and saw Reno Scum turn heel in a post-match attack on their opponents. This set up a rematch, which aired on March 15. In a March 20, 2019 Nerd Corp interview, Thornstowe stated that Reno Scum have not signed a contract with Impact, but hoped that the two could be back full-time with the Company by this summer.

The duo next appeared at Unbreakable, an August 2, 2019 Impact Plus special from Esports Arena in Santa Ana, California, in a triple threat Impact World Tag Team Championship match against Willie Mack and Rich Swann and defending champions The North (Ethan Page and Josh Alexander). The latter retained as Thornstowe took the pin-fall loss.

The North once again defeated Reno Scum, who returned as faces to answer the former's open challenge for the Tag Team Championship, on Impact's August 23, 2019 airing, dubbed "Cali Combat," taped August 4 at the Oceanview Pavilion in Port Hueneme, California.

On April 6, 2021, Luster announced that he and Adam had left Impact Wrestling.

== Championships and accomplishments ==
- All Pro Wrestling
  - APW Tag Team Championship (3 times)
  - APW Universal Heavyweight Championship (2 times, final) – Luster
  - APW Worldwide Internet Championship (1 time) – Thornstowe
- Championship Wrestling from Hollywood
  - UWN Tag Team Championship (1 time)
- Future Stars of Wrestling
  - FSW Tag Team Championship (4 times)
- Global Force Wrestling
  - GFW Women's Championship (1 time) – Christina
  - GFW Women's Championship Tournament (2015)
- Pro Wrestling Illustrated
  - Ranked Luster #155 of the top 500 singles wrestlers in the PWI 500 in 2017
  - Ranked Thornstowe #161 of the top 500 singles wrestlers in the PWI 500 in 2017
- Supreme Pro Wrestling
  - SPW Tag Team Championship (2 times)
