= Donovan Morgan =

American professional wrestler

Personal information
- Born: Andrew Vassos; January 10, 1976 (age 50) Modesto, California, U.S.

Professional wrestling career
- Ring name: Donovan Morgan
- Billed height: 5 ft 11 in (1.80m)
- Billed weight: 210 lb (95 kg)
- Billed from: Modesto, California
- Trained by: Michael Modest; Ric Thompson
- Debut: June 27, 1996
- Retired: June 30, 2006

Andrew Vassos (born January 10, 1976) is an American former professional wrestler better known by his ring name Donovan Morgan. Best known for his near five-year run as a Pro Wrestling NOAH mainstay in Japan and Ring of Honor in the United States, Morgan received TV work with World Championship Wrestling and the World Wrestling Federation in between 1997 and 2001. Morgan also received an invite to wrestle in ECW in 1999 but turned it down as Morgan had other commitments.

== Professional wrestling career ==
Vassos graduated from Ripon Christian High School in 1994 at the age of eighteen, and attended Modesto Junior College for a year before deciding to become a professional wrestler. He left college at the age of twenty and attended the APW Boot Camp in Hayward, California where he was trained by Michael Modest and Ric Thompson for two years. He debuted in All Pro Wrestling on June 29, 1996, in Hayward, California as "Donovan Morgan", facing Dwayne Jones.

Soon after his debut, Morgan began feuding with his trainer, Michael Modest. Morgan's first title win in APW was on January 25, 1997, when he and his partner, Robert Thompson, defeated Modest and Steve Rizzono for the APW Tag Team Championships in a Two out of three falls match, winning two straight falls. They held the titles until August 1, when they lost to Tony Jones and Jay Smooth. Morgan continued his feud with Modest, and on July 7 they faced one another in a match for the vacant APW Universal Heavyweight Championship. Modest was victorious, but Morgan continued to pursue the title, eventually defeating Modest for the Universal Heavyweight Championship on September 5 in what was considered a major upset. Modest regained the title less than a month later on October 3.

In early 2000, Morgan formed a stable with Vinny Massaro and Vanilla Frost called "The New Breed". On April 15, 2000, Morgan defeated Boyce LeGrande for the APW Internet Championship in the finals of a one night tournament (the previous champion, Christopher Daniels, had been signed by World Championship Wrestling and subsequently stripped of the belt). After Morgan won the Universal Heavyweight Championship for a second time, defeating Ed Moretti on October 7, 2000, he was informed by APW Commissioner Gabe Ramirez that he was not allowed to hold two titles simultaneously, so he vacated the Internet Championship on October 28.

After Morgan lost the Universal Heavyweight Championship to Vic Capri on April 28, 2001, he immediately began pursuing the Internet Championship once more, beating Vinny Massaro on May 19. He was stripped of the title on November 27 after he left APW along with Modest and several other wrestlers following a disagreement with APW owner Roland Alexander.

Until he left APW, Morgan acted as the head camp instructor of the APW professional wrestling school. He was replaced by Spanky and The American Dragon.

Morgan formed a tag team with Modest known as "Excellence, Inc.", and the duo was signed to contracts in Japan with the NOAH promotion on July 14, 2001. Morgan and Modest became Noah regulars often facing Japanese legend Mitsuharu Misawa. Morgan and Modest formed a stable in Noah with fellow gaijins 2 Cold Scorpio and Bison Smith known as Team KAOS. After almost 5 years of wrestling in Japan full time Morgan and Modest would exit Pro Wrestling NOAH in 2006 after their contracts had expired. Morgan soon retired from Pro Wrestling in June 2006.

After leaving All Pro Wrestling, Morgan and Modest decided to open their own dojo, "The Tetsu Academy". They later opened their own promotion in conjunction with the training center, "Pro Wrestling Iron", located in Hayward, Ca which held its first show on May 31, 2002, in Ukiah, California. Morgan and Modest eventually negotiated a talent swap agreement with Pro Wrestling Noah in Japan that saw Japanese wrestlers such as Misawa, Yoshinori Ogawa, and Takao Omori appear on PWI shows. Morgan and Modest continued to team in PWI and defeated Los Maximos in a match to decide the first ever PWI Tag Team Championships on June 11, 2004. In July 2004 Modest and Morgan wrestled in front of 79,458 fans at the world famous Tokyo Dome where Donovan Morgan pinned Ricky Marvin for Pro Wrestling NoAH's largest show in its history. In addition, they continued to train wrestlers at the Tetsu Academy. August 31, 2005 marked the end of the Tetsu Academy, with a final show at the PWI dojo in Hayward, California on August 27, 2005.

On September 21, 2002, Morgan and Christopher Daniels, known collectively as The Prophecy, won a tournament to crown the first ever ROH Tag Team Champions, defeating Modest and his partner, The American Dragon aka (Daniel Bryan). They held the titles until March 15, 2003, when they were defeated by A.J. Styles and Amazing Red. Morgan and Modest left ROH soon after following disputes over accommodation and schedule clashes with their Japanese commitments.

One of the highlights of Morgan's career was an especially spicy match held at the Lathrop Community Center in Lathrop, California. Morgan and Modest clashed with Bison Smith in the ring before a packed house of raucous fans. Bison found himself accosted by a group of local animal rights activists angered by his zoological misappropriation. Morgan and Modest capitalized on his distraction and won the day. There were various reports of the trio seen scuffling after the match at the Fireside Lounge, down the street.

On the February 18, 2006 episode of TNA Impact!, Morgan teamed with Michael Modest and Ryan Drago as La Migra. The trio were defeated by The Latin American Xchange. On the March 3, 2006 episode of TNA Xplosion, Morgan and Modest were defeated by The Naturals.

Morgan became a mortgage broker in 2006. and continued into the world of financial services in 2008. Morgan is currently an advisor and financial consultant in Florida.

== Championships and accomplishments ==
- All Pro Wrestling
  - APW Worldwide Internet Championship (2 times)
  - APW Tag Team Championship (1 time) – with Robert Thompson
  - APW Universal Heavyweight Championship (2 times)
- Cauliflower Alley Club
  - Future Legend Award (2001)
- East Coast Wrestling Association
  - Super 8 Tournament (2002)
- Midwest Championship Wrestling
  - MCW Lightweight Championship (1 time)
- North American Wrestling
  - NAW Light Heavyweight Championship (1 time)
- Pro Wrestling Illustrated
  - Ranked No. 73 of the 500 best singles wrestlers the PWI 500 in 2004
- Pro Wrestling Iron
  - PWI Tag Team Championship (1 time) – with Michael Modest
- Pro Wrestling NOAH
  - 10-Man Battle Royal (2002)
- Ring of Honor
  - ROH Tag Team Championship (1 time, inaugural) – with Christopher Daniels
  - ROH Tag Team Championship Tournament (2002) – with Christopher Daniels
