= APW Universal Heavyweight Championship =

Professional wrestling championship

Details
- Promotion: All Pro Wrestling
- Date established: October 12, 1996
- Date retired: December 31, 2024
Statistics
- First champion: Robert Thompson
- Final champion: Luster The Legend
- Most reigns: Maxx Justice and Michael Modest (5 reigns)
- Longest reign: Jeff Cobb (545 days)
- Shortest reign: Ed Morretti (<1 day)

The APW Universal Heavyweight Championship was a professional wrestling world heavyweight championship contested in All Pro Wrestling. It was introduced on October 12, 1996, when Robert Thompson defeated Michael Modest in the finals of a tournament to become the inaugural champion.

== Title history ==
Key
No.	Overall reign number
Reign	Reign number for the specific champion
Days	Number of days held
<1	Reign lasted less than a day
+	Current reign is changing daily

No.	Champion	Championship change			Reign statistics		Notes	Ref.
No.	Champion	Date	Event	Location	Reign	Days	Notes	Ref.
1	Robert Thompson	October 12, 1996	Night of Champions & Legends	Modesto, CA	1	147	Defeated Michael Modest in tournament final to become the first champion.	
2	Manny Fernandez	March 8, 1997	Return of the Ragin Bull	Cupertino, CA	1	91		
—	Vacated	June 7, 1997	—	—	—	—	Fernandez vacated the title upon leaving the promotion.	
3	Michael Modest	July 4, 1997	Catfight	Hayward, CA	1	63	Defeated Donovan Morgan in the finals of a tournament to win the vacant title.	
4	Donovan Morgan	September 5, 1997	Sports Annihilation	Hayward, CA	1	28		
5	Michael Modest	October 3, 1997	Night of the Return Match	Hayward, CA	2	119		
6	Robert Thompson	January 3, 1998	The Large Garage	San Jose, CA	2	56		
7	Maxx Justice	March 27, 1998	Return to the Large Garage	San Jose, CA	1	35		
8	Vic Grimes	May 1, 1998	Grimes/O'Grady Send-Off	Hayward, CA	1	8		
—	Vacated	May 9, 1998	—	—	—	—	Vacated the title upon leaving the promotion for World Wrestling Federation.	
9	Maxx Justice	May 16, 1998	Spartanfest '98	Pinole, CA	2	154	Defeated Fatu for the vacant title.	
10	Boom Boom Comini	October 17, 1998	Raising Hell in Highlands	North Highlands, CA	1	13	Defeated Fatu for the vacant title.	
11	Michael Modest	October 30, 1998	Halloween Hell 2: The Final Garage Show	Hayward, CA	3	133		
12	Maxx Justice	March 12, 1999	Last Chance for Justice	Hayward, CA	3	50		
13	Boyce LeGrande	May 1, 1999	Good Things Happen to Bad Boys	Pinole, CA	1	20		
14	Maxx Justice	May 21, 1999	Too Hot to Handle	Pinole, CA	4	−60		
15	Vinny Massaro	May 22, 1999	Mack Daddy's & Gigolo's	Hayward, CA	1	−58		
—	Vacated	May 25, 1999	—	—	—	—	The Pro Wrestling Council ruled that due to outside interference from unlicensed referees, the title would be stripped from Vinny Massaro and held in escrow. A four corners match was to be held on July 10, 1999, in San Jose, including Massaro, Maxx Justice, Michael Modest, and Boyce LeGrande to determine a new champion.	
16	Maxx Justice	July 10, 1999	Four Corners Match	San Jose, CA	5	77	Also in the match was Vinny Massaro, Michael Modest, and Boyce LeGrande	
17	Shane Dynasty	September 25, 1999	Road Rage	Lompoc, CA	1	14	Justice faced masked newcomer Super Diabliquo for the title and there was a question about who was actually under the mask. In an earlier Battle Royal, Super Diabliquo was thought to be Shane Dynasty, but during the title contest, Dynasty was revealed to be ringside wearing a clown mask. While the referee was distracted, Dynasty was knocked unconscious by the Freaks, stripped to his underwear, then substituted for Chris Ward, who was wrestling as Super Diabliquo. Afterward, he was unmasked and declared the champion.	
18	Michael Modest	October 9, 1999	100th Anniversary Show	Pacifica, CA	4	98		
19	Tony Jones	January 15, 2000	Millennium Madness	Healdsburg, CA	1	56		
20	Ma'Och	March 11, 2000	5th Anniversary Show	San Leandro, CA	1	35		
21	Frank Murdoch	April 15, 2000	Farewell To Modest: Worldwide Internet Tournament	Livingston, CA	1	133		
22	The Honky Tonk Man	August 26, 2000	Carnival of Carnage 2	Antioch, CA	1	42	Tony Jones attempted to hit the Honky Tonk Man with a kendo stick, but accidentally struck Murdoch to give the challenger the victory.	
—	Vacated	October 7, 2000	Changing of the Guard	—	—	—	APW commissioner Gabe Ramirez declared the title vacant when the Honky Tonk Man failed to appear for a title defense.	
23	Ed Moretti	October 7, 2000	Changing of the Guard	San Francisco, CA	1	<1	APW commissioner Gabe Ramirez awarded the title to Ed Moretti when Honky Tonk Man failed to appear for a title defense.	
24	Donovan Morgan	October 7, 2000	Changing of the Guard	San Francisco, CA	2	193	Morgan defeated Moretti the same evening for the title. Morgan also held the APW Worldwide Internet Championship in conjunction with the APW Universal Heavyweight Championship.	
25	Vic Capri	April 18, 2001	N/A	Chicago, IL	1	45	During Morgan's tour of the Midwest, he was upset by 2000 KOTI participant Vic Capri in a Two out of Three falls Ladder match. Capri became the first person outside of APW to win the title.	
26	Michael Modest	June 2, 2001	Land of the Giants	Pacifica, CA	5	149		
—	Vacated	October 29, 2001	—	—	—	—		
27	Robert Thompson	May 11, 2002	Live Event	Pacifica, CA	3	167	Defeated American Dragon in the finals of a tournament to win the title.	
28	Larry Blackwell	October 25, 2002	Halloween Hell	Hayward, CA	1	42	Pinned Thompson in a "Double Jeopardy" tag team match to win the title. Blackwell teamed up with Kafu while Thompson teamed up with Jardi Frantz.	
29	Robert Thompson	December 6, 2002	Live Event	Hayward, CA	4	21		
30	Bobby Quance	December 27, 2002	Kristmas Kaos	Hayward, CA	1	302		
—	Vacated	N/A	—	—	—	—	Quance was stripped of the title.	
†	James Watkins	October 23, 2003	—	—	1	0	Watkins "won" the title when Robert Thompson laid down for Watkins to pin him. APW stripped him as result.	
31	James Watkins	March 14, 2004	The Garage Rumble	Hayward, CA	2	230		
32	Nate Rulez	March 14, 2004	Halloween Hell 7 - Day 2	Hayward, CA	2	224		
33	Kafu	June 11, 2005	Live Event	Hayward, CA	1	175		
34	Derek Sanders	December 3, 2005	Kristmas Kaos	Hayward, CA	1	238		
35	Dana Lee	July 29, 2006	Gym Wars	Hayward, CA	1	0		
—	Vacated	July 29, 2006	—	Hayward, CA	—	—	Lee was stripped immediately after the match due to his actions in the APW Wrestling School.	
36	Derek Sanders	August 12, 2006	Gym Wars	Hayward, CA	2	35	Defeated The Great Tenshi in tournament final to win the title.	
37	Dana Lee	September 2, 2006	Live Event	San Francisco, CA	2	42		
38	Kafu	October 14, 2006	October Reign	Bakersfield, CA	2	161		
39	Oliver John	March 24, 2007	March Madness	Bakersfield, CA	1	182		
40	Adam Thornstowe	September 22, 2007	Gym Wars	Hayward, CA	1	21	Was a Two out of Three falls match. Thronstowe defeated John in two straight falls.	
41	Mr. Prime Time	October 13, 2007	Halloween Hell X	Hayward, CA	1	245	Was a Three-Way Falls Count Anywhere match. Also in the match was Oliver John.	
42	Oliver John	June 14, 2008	Gym Wars	Hayward, CA	2	175		
43	Dylan Drake	December 6, 2008	Gym Wars – Kristmas Kaos	Hayward, CA	1	336	Drake won the title in a Steel Cage match.	
44	Malachi	November 7, 2009	Gym Wars	Hayward, CA	1	182		
45	Jeckles the Jester	May 8, 2010	Gym Wars	Hayward, CA	1	60		
46	Derek Sanders	July 7, 2010	Wrestling For The Wounded Warrior Project	Santa Rosa, CA	3	150		
47	Dylan Drake	December 4, 2010	Kristmas Kaos	Hayward, CA	2	224		
50	Jeckles	July 16, 2011	Gym Wars	Hayward, CA	2	49		
51	Timothy Thatcher	September 3, 2011	Gym Wars	Hayward, CA	1	42		
—	Vacated	October 15, 2011	Halloween Hell XIV	—	—	—	Commissioner J.J. Perez announced at Halloween Hell XIV that Thatcher was unable to compete and vacated the title.	
52	Jeckles	October 15, 2011	Halloween Hell XIV	Hayward, CA	3	91	Defeated Gangrel for the vacant title.	
53	Jody Kristofferson	January 14, 2012	Gym Wars	Hayward, CA	1	0	Won the annual "Pick The Winner" battle royal, granting him a Universal Heavyweight Title opportunity which he used the same night to defeat Jeckles.	
—	Vacated	January 14, 2012	Gym Wars	Hayward, CA	—	—	Upon winning the title, Kristofferson reluctantly forfeited the title citing his recent developmental deal with WWE.	
54	Timothy Thatcher	February 18, 2012	Gym Wars	Hayward, CA	2	259	Defeated A.J. Kirsch, Dylan Drake, and Jeckles in a Four-Way Elimination match to win the vacant title.	
55	Dylan Drake	November 3, 2012	Gym Wars	Hayward, CA	3	63	Drake won the title in a Steel Cage match.	
†	J. R. Kratos	January 5, 2013	Hardcore 100	Hayward, CA	4	28		
†	Dylan Drake	February 2, 2013	Hardcore 100	Hayward, CA	4	70	Drake regained the title from JR Kratos after Commissioner Blackwell was forced to return the title to Drake after fearing multiple lawsuits from Drake's attorney Mr. Ramirez. Drake continues his reign as champion, though Kratos held the physical belt since January 5. This was all due to a referee "mistake" in the January 5 match. This is considered a continuation of Drake's previous reign.	
56	Adam Thornstowe	April 13, 2013	Gym Wars	Hayward, CA	2	426	This was a Three-Way match that included Dylan Drake and Timothy Thatcher.	
57	Rik Luxury	June 13, 2014	Friday the 13th	San Francisco, CA	1	273		
58	J. R. Kratos	March 13, 2015	Friday the 13th Part 2	San Francisco, CA	1^{(2)}	351		
59	Jody Kristofferson	February 27, 2016	Westlake Royale	Daly City, CA	2	230		
60	MVP	October 14, 2016	Halloween Hell XX	Daly City, CA	1	162		
61	Luster the Legend	March 25, 2017	Legends are Born	Daly City, CA	1	61		
62	Jeff Cobb	May 6, 2017	Cow Palace Royale	San Francisco, CA	1	545		
63	Jacob Fatu	November 2, 2018	Halloween Hell	Daly City, CA	1	273		
64	Jake Atlas	August 2, 2019	SuckaFree	Daly City, CA	1	105		
—	Vacated	November 15, 2019	Game Recognize Game	Hayward, CA	—	—	Atlas vacated the title upon signing a developmental contract with WWE.	
65	Marcus Lewis	September 3, 2022	Bay Area Bash	Daly City, CA	1	714	Earlier in the show Fred Rosser faced JR Kratos for the vacant title, but the match went to a no contest. In the main event, a battle royal was held to determine the new champion. Lewis last eliminated Kratos to win the vacant championship.	
66	Luster The Legend	August 17, 2024	APW Hardcore August Fights	Manteca, California	2	136	defeated Marcus Lewis, Boyce LeGrande and Jheri Giggalow in a four way match.	
—	Deactivated	December 31, 2024	—	—	—	—	The title was deactivated when the promotion ceased operations.	

== Combined reigns ==
As of August 4, 2026.

Key
<1	Indicates reign was less than one day

Rank	Wrestler	No. of reigns	Combined days
1	Dylan Drake	3	721
2	Marcus Lewis	1	714
3	Jeff Cobb	1	545
4	J. R. Kratos	1	453
5	Adam Thornstowe	2	437
6	Derek Sanders	3	406
7	Robert Thompson	4	391
8	Oliver John	2	357
9	Kafu	2	336
10	Donovan Morgan	2	323
11	Michael Modest	5	329
12	Maxx Justice	5	317
13	Bobby Quance	1	302
14	Timothy Thatcher	2	301
15	Rik Luxury	1	273
15	Jacob Fatu	1	273
17	Ma'och	2	266
18	Mr. Prime Time	1	245
19	James Watkins	1	230
19	Jody Kristofferson	1	230
20	Nate Rulez	1	224
21	Jeckles the Jester/Jeckles	3	203
22	Malachi	1	182
23	Luster the Legend	2	178
24	MVP	1	162
25	Frank Murdoch	1	133
26	Jake Atlas	1	105
27	Manny Fernandez	1	91
28	Tony Jones	1	56
29	Vic Capri	1	45
30	The Honky Tonk Man	1	42
30	Larry Blackwell	1	42
30	Dana Lee	1	42
31	Boyce LeGrande	1	20
32	SHane Dynasty	1	14
33	Boom Boom Comini	1	13
34	Vic Grimes	1	8
35	Vinny Massaro	1	3
36	Ed Morretti	1	<1

== See also ==
- All Pro Wrestling
- APW Tag Team Championship
- APW Worldwide Internet Championship
