= Michael Modest =

American professional wrestler (born 1971)

Personal information
- Born: Michael K. Cariglio; July 19, 1971 (age 55) Berkeley, California, U.S.

Professional wrestling career
- Ring name(s): La Migra; Michael Modest; Mike Modest; Private Pain
- Billed height: 5 ft 10 in (1.78 m)
- Billed weight: 212 lb (96 kg; 15.1 st)
- Billed from: San Francisco, California; Sacramento, California
- Trained by: Rick Thompson; Jerry Monti
- Debut: 1991

Michael K. Cariglio (born July 19, 1971) is an American professional wrestler, better known by his stage name, Michael Modest (sometimes shortened to Mike Modest). Modest ran the promotion Pro Wrestling Iron with tag partner Donovan Morgan and Frank Murdoch until its closure in 2005. Modest has also wrestled in Japan for Pro Wrestling Noah, winning the GHC Junior Heavyweight Championship after defeating Yoshinobu Kanemaru. He has also wrestled in Canada, Mexico and Ireland. He is perhaps best known for his appearances in the wrestling documentary Beyond the Mat, the film Ready to Rumble, and the TV special Exposed! Pro Wrestling's Greatest Secrets (under a mask as "Private Pain").

== Professional wrestling career ==
Modest began wrestling in 1991, and has worked for All Pro Wrestling, Universal Wrestling Association, and World Championship Wrestling (WCW), along with both AAA and Consejo Mundial de Lucha Libre (CMLL) in Mexico. Modest had try-out matches for both the World Wrestling Federation (WWF) and WCW, and eventually got signed to a WCW contract, although he was released after WWF bought WCW. After his release, he began working for Pro Wrestling Noah in Japan. In 2001, he also worked for Stampede Wrestling, and won the North American Heavyweight and Pacific Heavyweight titles. He was the last Pacific Heavyweight Champion.

Modest also operated the Pro Wrestling IRON school and promotion in the US, along with his tag team partner Donovan Morgan. He also briefly worked for Ring of Honor.

On March 18, 2005, Modest won the Mike Lockwood Memorial Tournament held by New Breed Wrestling Association, defeating Jamie Noble in the finals. On February 18, 2006, Modest wrestled in a six-man tag team match with Morgan and Ryan Drago, as "La Migra" on an episode of TNA Impact!. They lost to the Latin American Xchange.

In March 2006, Modest took part in a six-man tag team match with partners Frankie Kazarian and Scott D'Amore against Cibernético, Chessman, and Muerte Cibernética at a AAA taping in Querétaro.

In 2014, YouTube personality Brian Zane interviewed Modest, who described his involvement with the NBC TV special Exposed! Pro Wrestling's Greatest Secrets, where Modest described how the producers of the special orchestrated how they created the special. Modest testified that "they took bits and pieces" of what the producers thought would cause a reaction towards their ultimate goal of proving professional wrestling as fake.

== Personal life ==
Modest is divorced and has two sons. Modest currently lives in Las Vegas and is working for the Las Vegas Wrestling promotion Future Stars of Wrestling, where he is also the head trainer.

== Championships and accomplishments ==
- All Pro Wrestling
  - APW Worldwide Internet Championship (1 time)
  - APW Tag Team Championship (2 times) – with Steve Rizzono (1) and Tony Jones (1)
  - APW Universal Heavyweight Championship (5 times)
  - APW Cup Tournament (1999)
- Future Stars of Wrestling
  - FSW Heavyweight Championship (1 time)
- Indie Wrestling Hall of Fame
  - Class of 2023
- New Breed Wrestling Association
  - Mike Lockwood Memorial Tournament (2005)
- North American Wrestling
  - NAW Heavyweight Championship (1 time)
- Pennsylvania Championship Wrestling
  - PCW Heavyweight Championship (1 time)
- Pro Wrestling Illustrated
  - Ranked No. 58 of the top 500 singles wrestlers of the PWI 500 in 2003
- Pro Wrestling Iron
  - PWI Tag Team Championship (1 time) – with Donovan Morgan
- Pro Wrestling Noah
  - GHC Junior Heavyweight Championship (1 time)
- Stampede Wrestling
  - Stampede North American Heavyweight Championship (1 time)
  - Stampede Pacific Heavyweight Championship (1 time)
- West Coast Wrestling Connection
  - WCWC Tag Team Championship (1 time) - with G.Q. Gallo
