= All Pro Wrestling =

American professional wrestling promotion and training school

- Founded: 1991
- Defunct: 2023
- Style: Professional wrestling
- Headquarters: Hayward, California
- Founder: Roland Alexander
- Owner: Markus Mac
- Formerly: Pacific Coast Sports
- Website: AllProWrestling.com

All Pro Wrestling was an American professional wrestling promotion and training school, based in Hayward, California. The company was founded by Roland Alexander and managed by him until his death on November 5, 2013. It is located 45 miles southeast of San Francisco, 15 miles south of Oakland, and 35 miles north of San Jose.

== History ==
All Pro Wrestling opened in 1991 under the name, "Pacific Coast Sports". The school and its "Gym Wars" events maintained a strong local following throughout the 1990s, but it wasn't until professional wrestling's Attitude Era that APW gained national notoriety.

In 1999, All Pro Wrestling (APW) was featured as part of the documentary film, Beyond the Mat. Roland Alexander, along with wrestlers Tony Jones and Michael Modest appeared, as they were having a tryout match with the World Wrestling Federation. The spot in the film was said to have tremendously boosted the school's "Boot Camp" sign ups.

APW suffered a wrongful death lawsuit to the family of APW Boot Camp trainee, Brian Ong. On May 28, 2001, Ong was training with fellow trainee Dalip Singh, despite suffering from an earlier concussion. Singh delivered a flapjack to Ong twice, with his head striking the mat and worsening his concussion. He was pronounced dead on arrival to a local hospital. Ong's family sued APW for reckless behavior. The case was filed in September 2002, and the trial was underway on June 10, 2005. After a three-week trial, on July 12, the jury voted unanimously in favor of the Ong family. APW was forced to pay $1.3 million to the Ong family.

After a dispute with Roland Alexander in 2002, most of the APW roster, including trainers Michael Modest, Donovan Morgan, and Frank Murdoch left the company to start a training facility known as the Pro Wrestling IRON Tetsu Academy (now defunct). In April 2008, booker and promoter Gabriel Ramirez left the company to start his own promotion, Pro Wrestling Revolution. Former wrestling manager John LaRocca took over as head booker for the company.

In October 2005, future WWE champion Becky Lynch (using the ring name Rebecca Knox) appeared at the APW affiliated promotion ChickFight III.

In December 2009, APW began televising taped shows All Pro Wrestling Gym Wars on Saturday mornings on Channel 50 / Cable 199 in the San Francisco Bay Area.

On December 14, 2011, All Pro Wrestling and Vendetta Pro Wrestling announced the Vendetta Pro Tag Team Titles will now be booked in All Pro Wrestling as well. The title was renamed the APW-Vendetta Pro "Unified" Tag Team Championship and be defended on Vendetta Pro and APW events. At that time "Dos Perfectos" (Greg Hernandez and Jesse Jimenez) were the Vendetta Pro Tag Team Champions and were crowned the first APW/Vendetta Pro Unified Tag Team Champions.

Alexander died on November 5, 2013, following heart and diabetes issues, aged 59.

The company is now run by head booker Markus Mac and is currently holding events at the Bayshore Community Center in Daly City, California. After the closing of the APW Garage head trainer Jeckles opened his own school, the Puppet Masters Dojo, in Hayward, California.

== APW Alumni ==
=== Wrestlers ===
Ring name
Adam Thornstowe
Boyce LeGrande
Boom Boom Comini
Buddy Royal
Chastity
Cheerleader Melissa
Chris Masters
Colt Cabana
Daniel Torch
Dalton Frost
Damien Grundy
Dave Dutra
Donovan "Future Legend" Morgan
Dylan Drake
Forsaken - Wicked Wayz
Jake Atlas
JECKLES
Jeffrey Cobb
Joey Ryan
Jody Kristofferson
J. R. Kratos
Julio Pedroza
Jungle Boy
Kid Chrome
Levi Shapiro
Luster the Legend
Mark "Bison Smith"/Super Destroyer 2000
Matt Carlos
Marcus Lewis
Mike "The Natural One" Modest
MVP
Omega
Rik Luxury
Sione Finau
Tony "The Shooter" Jones
Tommy Drake
Vinnie Massaro
Virgil Flynn
Wicked Wayz
Powerhouse Hobbs

=== Managers and valets ===
- Markus Mac (Pink Mink Inc. - Matt Carlos, Vinny Massaro, & Julio Pedroza)
- Brian Zane (The Classic Connection- Levi Shapiro & Buddy Royal)
- Caesar Black (Animal Farm - Will Rood, Damien Grundy & Kevin Michael Johnson) (The Black Armada- Papo Esco & "The Nightmare" Synn)
- Lucian D. Light (Bad Boys - Boyce LeGrande, Derek Slade, Rik Luxury, & Dominic Teizeira)
- Buddy Cotello, Esq. (Cotello Syndicate - Super Destroyer 2000, Vinnie Massaro, Sheik Ali Boom Boom, Christopher Daniels, Dalip Singh/The Great Khali)

=== Staff ===
- Markus Mac (APW Booker)
- Sparkey Ballard (Senior Official)
- Shane Mai (Production Director)

== APW Championships/Accomplishments ==
=== Current championships ===
Championship	Current champion(s)	Reign	Date won	Days held	Location	Notes
APW Universal Heavyweight Championship	Luster the Legend	2	September 17, 2024	774	Sparks, Nevada	defeated Marcus Lewis, Boyce LeGrande and Jheri Giggalow at Hardcore August Fights.
WWW YouTube Championship	Kaine Jaiden	1	January 18, 2025	651	Eugene, Oregon	Defeated Levi Shapiro at POW! Heel the World.
APW Junior Heavyweight Championship	Chris Bey	1	September 03, 2022	1,519	Daly City, CA	Defeated Dave Dutra, Marcus Lewis and Midas Kreed to win the vacant title at Bay Area Bash.
APW Tag Team Championship	Cory Dayton and Frank Lee Gorgeous	1 (1, 1)	September 06, 2023	1,151	San Francisco, CA	Defeated The Bad Boys (Derek Slade and Dominic Teixeira).

== Defunct Championships ==
Championship	Champion	Previous	Date Won	Date Retired
APW Above The Law/Future Legends Championship	Cheerleader Melissa	Mariko Yoshida	May 3, 2005	Fall 2005
APW/Vendetta Pro Unified Tag Team Championship	Ochoa Joshua	Pink Mink, Inc. ("Magnificent" Matt Carlos & "Wrestling Personified" Rik Luxury)	October 26, 2013	January 2014
APW Worldwide Internet Championship	Levi Shapiro	Will Hobbs	June 15, 2019	September 27, 2019

=== Tournaments/Special events ===
- List of All Pro Wrestling tournaments

== APW Junior Heavyweight Championship ==
APW Junior Heavyweight Championship

Details
- Promotion: All Pro Wrestling
- Date established: October 12, 1996
- Current champion: Chris Bey
- Date won: September 03, 2022
Statistics
- First champion: Super Diablo
- Longest reign: Steven Tresario (1010)
- Shortest reign: Erin O'Grady (49 days)
- Oldest champion: Steven Tresario (30 years)
- Youngest champion: "Jungle Boy" Nate Coy (21 years, 63 days)
- Heaviest champion: Super Diablo (205 lbs)
- Lightest champion: "Jungle Boy" Nate Coy (156 lbs)

=== Reigns ===
Key
No.	Overall reign number
Reign	Reign number for the specific champion
Days	Number of days held
<1	Reign lasted less than a day
+	Current reign is changing daily

No.	Champion	Championship change			Reign statistics		Notes	Ref.
No.	Champion	Date	Event	Location	Reign	Days	Notes	Ref.
1	Super Diablo	October 12, 1996	Night of Champions & Legends	Modesto, California	1	113	Defeated Erin O'Grady to become the inaugural champion. The exact length of the reign is uncertain due to Diablo vacating it in an inexact date between January and March of 1997.	
—	Vacated	February 2, 1997	—	—	—	—	Title vacated due to unknown circumstances.	
2	Erin O'Grady	March 22, 1997	Terra Nova Terror '97 - O'Grady Returns Home	Pacifica, California	1	49	O'Grady defeated Donovan Morgan to win the vacant title.	
3	Chris Cole	May 10, 1997	Modest Makes His Move	Hayward, California	1	146		
—	Deactivated	October 3, 1997	—	—	—	—	The title was abandoned and deactivated.	
4	"Jungle Boy" Nate Coy	August 17, 2018	Sucker Free	Daly City, California	1	302	The title was reactivated. This was a four way match also involving Manny Faberino, Marcus Lewis and Steven Tresario.	
5	Jake Atlas	June 15, 2019	Bay Area Bash	Daly City, California	1	80		
—	Vacated	September 3, 2019	—	—	—	—		
6	Steven Tresario	September 27, 2019	War at the Shore	Daly City, California	1	1,010	This was a four-way elimination match also involving Lucas Riley, Manny Mars and Starboy Charlie for the vacant title.	
—	Vacated	July 09, 2022	—	—	—	—	Title vacated due to injury.	
7	Chris Bey	September 03 ,2022	Bay Area Bash	Daly City, California	1	1,519	This was a four-way match also involving Dave Dutra, Marcus Lewis and Midas Kreed for the vacant title.	

=== Combined reigns ===
As of October 31, 2026.

†	Indicates the current champion

Rank	Wrestler	No. of reigns	Combined days
1	Steven Tresario	1	1010
2	Chris Bey †	1	1,519+
3	"Jungle Boy" Nate Coy	1	302
4	Chris Cole	1	146
5	Super Diablo	1	113
6	Jake Atlas	1	80
7	Erin O'Grady	1	49

== See also ==
- List of independent wrestling promotions in the United States
