= XPW Ten Year Anniversary Spectacular =

Ten Year Anniversary Spectacular
- Promotion: Xtreme Pro Wrestling
- Date: August 22, 2009
- City: Los Angeles, California
- Venue: Arena Night Club
- Attendance: 1,350

An Xtreme Pro Wrestling (XPW) reunion show called the XPW Ten Year Anniversary Spectacular, nicknamed XPW X, took place on August 22, 2009, at the Arena Night Club in Los Angeles. The event took place on the same weekend as SummerSlam, which was also taking place in Los Angeles. The main event of the show was a XPW King of the Deathmatch Championship match in which Supreme beat "The Hardcore Homo" Angel. This was the second XPW reunion show to have occurred, the first being Cold Day in Hell which was held on May 24, 2008.

== Event ==
=== Pre-show ===
During the first match on the event's pre-show, Joey Dynamite, Ray Rosas, and Oso Loco defeated Clay Motley, The Rookie 88, and Lucha Machine in a six-man tag team match. This was followed by a six-way match where Marcus Riot defeated Damien Arsenick, Willie Mack, LTP, Famous B, and Chimera.

Just prior to the start of the event's main card, Stepfather and The Red-Headed Stepchild called out and attacked Sexy Chino, who was then saved by Tool.

=== Preliminary matches ===
At the beginning of the event, Damien Steele was announced as the organization's new commissioner. Steele then announced a tournament to crown a new XPW World Heavyweight Champion. While Steele was announcing the tournament matches, he was interrupted by Homeless Jimmy who demanded to be involved in the tournament. Babi Slymm attacked Jimmy from behind and a tournament match was made between the two. Jimmy defeated Slymm to advance in the tournament. The rest of the tournament would not occur and the championship remained vacant until XPW's relaunch in 2021.

Next was an eight-person mixed tag match that saw Team SPW (Dante, Timothy Thatcher, El Chupacabra, Dante and Christina Von Eerie) defeat Team XPW (Matt Classic, Johhny Webb, Cast Iron Cothern, and The Fabulous Thunderkitty).

Mr. McPhenom then announced his intentions to purchase XPW. McPhenom stated that he would make XPW more family friendly and sports entertainment-based. G. Q. Money, McPhenom's financial adviser, was order to "bring the green" that would be used to complete the purchase. However, when McPhenom realized what G. Q. brought wasn't money but was marijuana, McPhenom attacked G.Q. and a match was made between the two for later in the evening.

Following the McPhenom/Money segment, Monica and Vinnie Massaro defeated Joey Ryan and J-Love in a 10-minute iron man strip match where the wrestler who was pinned the most times had to remove an article of clothing. As part of the stipulation, J-Love was supposed to take off her bra but refused and instead brought out a body double, who removed her bra to reveal both breasts covered with a black x. After this match, G. Q. Money defeated Mr. McPhenom.

Scorpio Sky and M-Dogg 20 wrestled to a time limit draw. After the match, Luke Hawx came to the ring and challenged M-Dogg 20, who was one-half of the final XPW World Tag Team Champions, and Sky to a tag title match. After M-Dogg 20 accepted, Hawx revealed his partner to be Sky, who turned on M-Dogg 20 and attacked him. Tool then entered the ring and was deemed Cross' new partner. The two teams wrestled with Hawx and Sky winning the match and the championship. After the match, Leroy the Ring Crew Guy was attacked by Pogo The Clown.

=== Main event matches ===
In the first match of a double main event, Carnage faced Youth Suicide in a Burned in Hell Death match. Weapons used during the match included a barbed wire covered bat, light bulbs, a glass shower door, and a staple gun. Vic Grimes, who accompanied Youth Suicide at ringside, lit a pizza cutter on fire and attacked Carnage with it but he would eventually recover and win the match after throwing lit flash paper at Youth Suicide.

In the final match of the event, Supreme successfully defended the XPW King of the Deathmatch Championship against "The Hardcore Homo" Angel in a Death match. Supreme dedicated the match to his father, who had died earlier that week.

== Aftermath ==
A third XPW reunion show, Perros del Mal vs. XPW, was held on August 20, 2011. The event was the first XPW reunion show to be held in Mexico and was co-promoted by the Perros del Mal promotion.

== Results ==
No.	Results	Stipulations
1	Joey Dynamite, Ray Rosas, Oso Loco defeated Clay Motley, The Rookie 88, and Lucha Machine	Six-man tag team match
2	Marcus Riot defeated Damien Arsenick, Willie Mack, LTP, Famous B, and Chimera	Dynamite D Memorial six-way match
3	Step Father and The Red-Headed Stepchild defeated Robby Phoenix and B.C. Killer	Tag team match
4	Homeless Jimmy defeated Babi Slymm	Singles match XPW World Heavyweight Championship tournament first round match
5	Team SPW (Dante, Timothy Thatcher, El Chupacabra, Dante and Christina Von Eerie) defeated Team XPW (Matt Classic, Johhny Webb, Cast Iron Cothern, and The Fabulous Thunderkitty)	Eight-person mixed tag team match
6	Vinnie Massaro and Monica defeated Joey Ryan and J-Love	10-minute Iron Man Strip match
7	G. Q. Money defeated Mr. McPhenom	Singles match
8	M-Dogg 20 vs. Scorpio Sky ended in a draw	Singles match
9	Luke Hawx and Scorpio Sky defeated M-Dogg 20 and Tool	Tag team match for the vacant XPW World Tag Team Championship
10	Pogo The Clown defeated Leroy the Ring Crew Guy	Singles match
11	Carnage defeated Youth Suicide (with Vic Grimes)	Burned in Hell Death match
12	Supreme (c) defeated "The Hardcore Homo" Angel (with BFF Amanda and Kraq)	Death match for the XPW King of the Deathmatch Championship
