= Supreme (wrestler) =

American professional wrestler (1970–2020)

Personal information
- Born: Lester Perfors; May 30, 1970 Hollywood, California, U.S.
- Died: May 6, 2020 (aged 49)
- Cause of death: heart attack

Professional wrestling career
- Ring name: Supreme
- Billed height: 5 ft 11 in (180 cm)
- Billed weight: 251 lb (114 kg)
- Trained by: Crazy 1
- Debut: 1995
- Retired: 2019

Lester Perfors (May 30, 1970 – May 6, 2020), better known by his ring name Supreme, was an American professional wrestler who fought hardcore style. Supreme was well known in Xtreme Pro Wrestling and Southern California promotions. He held the XPW King of the Deathmatch Championship five times.

== Career ==
Supreme began his career in 1995.

In 1999, Supreme made his debut for the California hardcore promotion Xtreme Pro Wrestling. He won his first XPW King of the Deathmatch Championship defeating John Kronus in a tournament at My Bloody Valentine 2000 . Then Supreme dropped the title to The Messiah on November 11, 2000, at Dismembered In November. Nearly a year later, Supreme won the vacated XPW King of the Deathmatch Championship defeating Vic Grimes at Halloween In Hell II. Supreme then dropped the title to ECW legend The Sandman at XPW Fallout on February 23, 2002. On July 20, 2002, he defeated Angel to win his third title in a tournament He then dropped the title to Luke Hawx on October 5, 2002. Supreme then regained the title from Hawx at Merry F'N Xmas on December 21, 2002. On March 8, 2003, XPW closed its doors and the title was deactivated.

While working for XPW, Supreme worked in the fall of 2000 for Japan's Frontier Martial-Arts Wrestling winning the WEW Hardcore Tag Team Championship with Homeless Jimmy.

After XPW, Supreme worked in the independent circuit in California, the States and Mexico. In 2005, he returned to Japan this time working for Big Japan Pro Wrestling.

On May 24, 2008, XPW had a reunion show called XPW Cold Day in Hell where Supreme won the XPW King of the Deathmatch Championship for the fifth and final time defeating Necro Butcher. Supreme held the title until XPW Ten Year Anniversary Spectacular on August 22, 2009 defeating Angel. The title was retired afterward. He wrestled at the last XPW reunion Perros del Mal vs. XPW in an eight-man tag team match losing to Los Perros del Mal (Damián 666, Bestia 666, Halloween, and X-Fly).

On July 20, 2019, Supreme was one of the inaugural inductees into the Santino Bros. Death Match Hall of Fame.

A few weeks later, Supreme wrestled his very last match was in a triple threat against Homeless Jimmy and Matt Tremont at CCW Crimson Cup 3. The match was won by Tremont.

== Personal life ==
He appeared in the wrestling video game Backyard Wrestling 2: There Goes The Neighborhood, released in 2004.

Supreme's nephew is Kaos (Joey Munoz) which they teamed together and his daughter Sage Sin who managed Supreme.

== Death ==
Supreme passed on May 6, 2020, from a heart attack just three weeks away before his 50th birthday.

== Championships and accomplishments ==
- Xtreme Pro Wrestling
  - XPW King of the Deathmatch Championship (5 times)
- Frontier Martial-Arts Wrestling
  - WEW Hardcore Tag Team Championship (1 time) with Homeless Jimmy
