= The Triple Threat =

Professional wrestling disbanded stable

Stable
- Leader: Shane Douglas
- Members: Chris Benoit; Dean Malenko; 2 Cold Scorpio; Chris Candido; Brian Lee; Bam Bam Bigelow; Lance Storm; Supreme; Lizzie Borden; Dread King Logan; Mitch Hewitt; Corky Robinson
- Debut: 1995
- Disbanded: 2013

The Triple Threat was a professional wrestling villainous stable that existed in Extreme Championship Wrestling (ECW) from 1995 to 1998. It was Shane Douglas's answer to Ric Flair's Four Horsemen. Douglas disliked Flair since he felt that Flair had held him back during his first run in World Championship Wrestling (WCW), when Flair was one of the bookers in WCW at the time.

== History ==
=== First incarnation ===
The original Triple Threat consisted of Shane Douglas, Chris Benoit and Dean Malenko in ECW. At one point they dominated ECW, as Douglas was ECW World Heavyweight Champion, and Benoit and Malenko were ECW World Tag Team Champions. Malenko also became a two-time ECW World Television Champion. The group developed a hand signal – the three outer fingers raised with palms facing outward.

During the summer of 1995, Douglas left for the World Wrestling Federation (WWF), thus disbanding the Triple Threat. However, for a brief time 2 Cold Scorpio was added as a member of the Triple Threat (at least one episode of ECW Hardcore TV had Scorpio, Benoit, and Malenko cutting a promo together stating they were the Triple Threat).

Nevertheless, when Benoit and Malenko left for WCW, the Triple Threat ceased to exist until Douglas returned to ECW. During their time in WCW, Benoit and Malenko were both members of the prominent Four Horsemen stable and often teamed together.

=== Second incarnation ===
In late 1996, approximately a year after his return to ECW, Douglas and his valet Francine formed an alliance with Chris Candido and the man for hire "Bulldozer" Brian Lee. In January 1997 at House Party, they formally dubbed themselves The Triple Threat. Douglas held the ECW World Television Championship, but sought to regain the ECW World Heavyweight Championship. In early 1997, a masked man (who displayed the mannerisms of Rick Rude) began stalking Francine. At ECW's first pay-per-view event Barely Legal, the man was revealed to be Brian Lee, who was kicked out of the Triple Threat for betraying Douglas.

Bam Bam Bigelow joined the group shortly after when Douglas introduced him as his tag team partner for a match at Chapter 2 in May 1997. Douglas lost the ECW World Television Championship to Taz, but won the ECW World Heavyweight Championship at Hardcore Heaven. Rick Rude eventually was persuaded by Shane Douglas to align with the Triple Threat. Rude promoted Chris Candido in his match against Taz at Hardcore Heaven 1997. Rude then began selecting Douglas's opponent to help Douglas become the greatest world champion in ECW. However, this turned out to be a ruse when Rude selected Triple Threat member Bam Bam Bigelow as Douglas's next opponent. Bigelow then challenged Douglas for the title and won, but forfeited his membership in the group in the process. Lance Storm took his place, but his tenure in the group was short-lived. Storm and Candido would win the tag team championship in December. However, the two did not get along with each other, leading to Storm being kicked out of the team. In January 1998, Bigelow was re-admitted to the group by helping Douglas defeat Taz.

Taz began a protracted feud with the entire stable, as he wanted a shot at Douglas's world title, but was repeatedly denied and instead being forced to wrestle matches against the other members of The Triple Threat. His frustration led to his creation of the Fuck The World Heavyweight Championship in defiance.

Another angle had Candido and Storm winning the ECW World Tag Team Championship together, and were forced to defend it despite their hatred for one another. During their reluctant title defenses, each man tried to one-up the other, and showed more concern for retaining the championship than for their partner's well-being.

For a brief time in 1998, once again every member of the group had an ECW title, with Douglas holding the ECW World Heavyweight Championship, Bigelow holding the ECW World Television Championship, and Candido holding one half of the ECW World Tag Team Championship with Triple Threat prospect Lance Storm. The group disbanded completely after Bigelow left for WCW, and Candido and Douglas went their separate ways after Douglas lost the ECW World Heavyweight Championship to Taz at Guilty as Charged.

== Later incarnations ==
=== The New Triple Threat (ECW) ===
In late 1998, Rob Van Dam, Sabu and Taz teamed up to form The New Triple Threat. They wrestled Douglas, Candido and Bigelow at November to Remember on November 1, 1998, and were able to defeat them. The New Triple Threat then disbanded due to inner dissension.

=== The Revolution (WCW) ===
In 1999, the three original members again teamed up, joining forces with Perry Saturn and Asya to form the group The Revolution.

=== Douglas, Candido and Bigelow in WCW ===
In 2000, Douglas, Candido and Bigelow were briefly reunited in a group together in WCW. Despite not using the name Triple Threat, they imitated the mannerisms of the group. The group was disbanded shortly after, when Candido left WCW.

=== Triple Threat reunited in XPW ===
In 2002, the Triple Threat reunited as Douglas, Lizzie Borden and Supreme, and went by the name The Irish Guys and Gals. The three dominated the singles division in Xtreme Pro Wrestling (XPW), with Douglas holding the XPW World Heavyweight Championship and Supreme holding the XPW King of the Deathmatch Championship. Douglas would feud with Candido in XPW until XPW folded in 2003.

=== Douglas, Candido and Bigelow in JAPW ===
In 2004, Douglas, Candido and Bigelow reunited at a Jersey All Pro Wrestling (JAPW) show just one year before Candido's death in 2005.

=== New Triple Threat in TKW ===
On October 14, 2020 Shane Douglas reformed the Triple Threat on a Total Kaos Wrestling event in Taylor, Michigan, with Dread King Logan and Mitch Hewitt

== Deaths ==
Three members of the Triple Threat died in a three-year span from 2005 to 2007. First on April 28, 2005, Candido would die of a blood clot from foot surgery. Then on January 19, 2007, Bigelow would die of heart disease and an overdose of cocaine. On June 24, Benoit killed himself after strangling his youngest son Daniel and his wife Nancy.

== Members ==
- Wrestlers
  - Shane Douglas (ECW, XPW) (leader)
  - Chris Benoit (ECW)
  - Dean Malenko (ECW)
  - 2 Cold Scorpio (one night only) (ECW)
  - Brian Lee (ECW)
  - Bam Bam Bigelow (ECW)
  - Lance Storm (ECW)
  - Chris Candido (ECW, XPW)
  - Supreme (XPW)
- Managers
  - Francine (ECW, Indies)
  - Tammy Lynn Sytch (ECW, XPW)
  - Lizzie Borden (XPW)
  - Rick Rude (ECW)

== Championships and accomplishments ==
- Extreme Championship Wrestling
  - ECW World Heavyweight Championship (4 times) – Douglas (3) and Bigelow (1)
  - ECW World Tag Team Championship (2 times) – Benoit and Malenko (1), and Candido and Storm (1)
  - ECW World Television Championship (3 times) – Malenko (1), Bigelow (1) and Douglas (1)
- Xtreme Pro Wrestling
  - XPW King of the Deathmatch Championship (4 times) – Supreme
  - XPW World Heavyweight Championship (2 times) – Douglas (1) and Candido (1)

== See also ==
- Jersey Triad
- The New Blood
