= Vinnie Massaro =

American professional wrestler

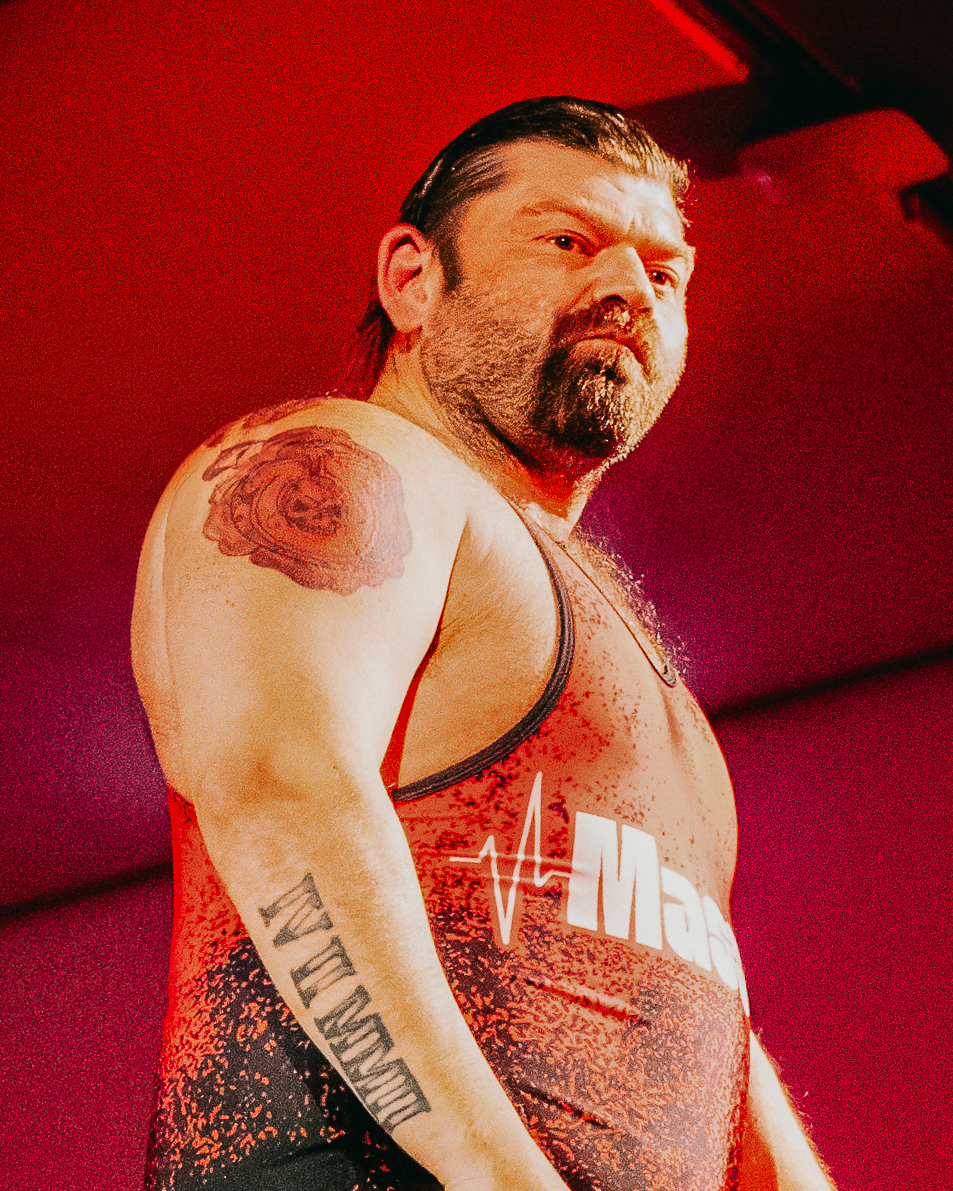
- Massaro in April 2025

Personal information
- Born: 19 September 1978 (age 48) Agrigento, Italy

Professional wrestling career
- Ring name: Dic Grimes The Innovator El Ultimo Panda Vincent Kennedy Massaro Vincenzo Vincenzo Massaro Vinnie Massaro Vinny Massaro
- Billed height: 172 cm (5 ft 8 in)
- Billed weight: 105 kg (231 lb)
- Trained by: Michael Modest
- Debut: September 19, 1997

Vincent Massaro bettern known by his ring name Vinnie Massaro is an Italian-American professional wrestler best known for his tenure with West Coast Pro Wrestling where he works as a promoter. He is also known for his time with All Pro Wrestling (APW), Xtreme Pro Wrestling (XPW) and with other promotions from the American independent circuit.

== Professional wrestling career ==
=== All Pro Wrestling (1997–2019) ===
Massaro made his professional wrestling debut in All Pro Wrestling at APW Mystery Card, a house show promoted on September 19, 1997 on his 19th birthday, where he teamed up with Vic Grimes as "The Grimes Brothers" and defeated Jay Smooth and Tony Jones to win the APW Tag Team Championship. During his ten-year tenure with the promotion, he is also a former one-time APW Universal Heavyweight Champion and one-time APW Worldwide Internet Champion. He also competed in various signature events of the promotion such as the King of the Indies Tournament in which he competed twice, in 2000, where he fell short to Scoot Andrews in the first rounds, and in 2001, where he scored a defeat against Low Ki in the same stage. By the end of 2001, he left APW.

He returned to APW on June 14, 2008 when he defeated Jeckles the Jester. He would have a feud with Mr. Wrestling IV. The feud ended when he lost in No Disqualification Mask vs Hair match. Remained with APW until 2010.

Then on October 5, 2013, Massaro made his second return to APW when he lst to JR Kratos.

=== American independent circuit (1997–present) ===
==== Other independent promotions (1997–2010) ====
Over the years, Massaro worked in various independent promotions in California. This included Ultimate Pro Wrestling, Pro Wrestling IRON, Pro Championship Wrestling, North American Wrestling, Supreme Pro Wrestling, and Empire Wrestling Federation.

==== Xtreme Pro Wrestling (2002; 2008–2009) ====
Massaro competed in the hardcore wrestling promotion Xtreme Pro Wrestling's various accomplishments. At Baptized In Blood III: Night Of Champions, on July 20, 2002, he took part in a tournament disputed for the XPW King of the Deathmatch Championship in which he fell short to Altar Boy Luke. He also competed in several major pay-per-views such as XPW Cold Day in Hell on May 24, 2008, where he teamed up with Jardi Frantz and X-Pac in a losing effort against Team Rev Pro (Ron Rivera, Disco Machine, and Joey Ryan). At XPW Ten Year Anniversary Spectacular from August 22, 2009, Massaro teamed up with Monica to defeat Joey Ryan and J-Love.

==== Pro Wrestling Revolution (2010-2023) ====
Massaro made his debut for Pro Wrestling Revolution on January 30, 2010. The promotion was based in San Jose and partnered with National Wrestling Alliance where he lost to Mr. Wrestling IV.

==== Lucha Underground (2015-2018) ====
Massaro then made his debut for Lucha Underground on January 8, 2015 hen he lost to Pentagon Jr..

=== All Elite Wrestling (2020–2025) ===
Massaro made his debut in an All Elite Wrestling event in the AEW Dark series of events, more exactly at AEW Dark #63 on November 18, 2020 (aired November 24) where he teamed up with Super Panda in a losing effort against Jurassic Express (Jungle Boy and Luchasaurus). Due to his activity in AEW taking a long hiatus, he made his return at AEW Dark: Elevation #106 on March 8, 2023 (aired March 13), where he teamed up with Midas Kreed in a losing effort against The Butcher and the Blade (The Blade and The Butcher). At AEW x Adult Swim Battle For The Booty on July 25, 2024, where he teamed up with Viva Van in a losing effort against Johnny TV and Taya Valkyrie.

=== West Coast Pro Wrestling (2021–present) ===
Massaro made his debut in West Coast Pro Wrestling at West Coast Pro Cruel Summer 2021 on July 9, where he fell short to Jacob Fatu in singles competition. Beyond being active as a wrestler, Massaro also works as a promoted for West Coast. At How The West Was Won on November 1, 2025, he defeated Kevin Blackwood in a title vs. career match to win the West Coast Pro Heavyweight Chmpionship. At West Coast Pro/DPW/Prestige Untouchable, a cross-over event hosted alongside Deadlock Pro-Wrestling (DPW) and Prestige Wrestling on July 20, 2024, Massaro unsuccessfully challenged Adam Priest for the DPW National Championship.

=== Japanese promotions (2018; 2023–present) ===
Massaro made his first appearances on Japanese soil during several events promoted by All Japan Pro Wrestling under the gimmick of "Ultimo Panda". His final appearance took place at AJPW Lucha Fiesta Tour 2018 Supported By AJP on November 6, where he teamed up with Tajiri to defeat Super Crazy and Black Tiger.

Due to West Coast Pro Wrestling's partnerships with Pro Wrestling Noah and Marvelous That's Women Pro Wrestling, Massaro returned to Japan in December 2023, at Noah The Best, where he teamed up with Stallion Rogers in a losing effort against Daiki Inaba and Masa Kitamiya.

Massaro made his debut in a major pay-per-view at Noah The New Year 2024 where he teamed up with El Hijo del Dr. Wagner Jr. and Titus Alexander in a losing effort against Good Looking Guys (Jake Lee, Jack Morris and Anthony Greene). At Noah Star Navigation 2024 on January 13, he and Alexander picked up a victory over Morris and LJ Cleary in tag team competition. Massaro also competed in the Monday Magic series of events, having wrestled at Autumn Final on November 25, 2024, where he teamed up with Anthony Greene and Titus Alexander in a losing effort against Los Golpeadores (Alpha Wolf and Dragon Bane), El Hijo de Dr. Wagner Jr. and Galeno del Mal.

== Personal life ==
Massaro was born in the Italian city of Agrigento and emigrated to San Francisco when he was 10 years old. He studied at Sacred Heart Cathedral Preparatory high school, but later dropped out to pursue a sports career, only to later graduate via homeschooling. As a daily job, Massaro works as a pest exterminator.

== Championships and accomplishments ==
- All Pro Wrestling
  - APW Universal Heavyweight Championship (1 time)
  - APW Worldwide Internet Championship (1 time)
  - APW Tag Team Championship (1 time) – with Vic Grimes
- California Championship Wrestling
  - CCW Heavyweight Championship (2 times)
- North American Wrestling
  - NAW Tag Team Championship (1 time) – with Big Ugly
- POW! Pro Wrestling
  - POW! Championship (1 time)
- PrideStyle Pro Wrestling
  - PrideStyle Tag Team Championship (1 time) – with Slay Area
- Pro Championship Wrestling
  - PCW Tag Team Championship (1 time) – with Adam Thornstowe
- Pro Wrestling Illustrated
  - Ranked No. 173 of the top 500 singles wrestlers in the PWI 500 of 2024
- Pro Wrestling Iron
  - PWI Tag Team Championship (1 time) – with Big Ugly
- Pro Wrestling Revolution
  - PWR Tag Team Championship (1 time) – with Willie Mack
- Supreme Pro Wrestling
  - SPW Tag Team Championship (1 time) – with Mike Hayashi
- West Coast Pro Wrestling
  - West Coast Pro Heavyweight Chmpionship (1 time)
