= XPW Cold Day in Hell =

2008 professional wrestling event

Cold Day in Hell
- Promotion: Xtreme Pro Wrestling
- Date: May 24, 2008
- City: Redondo Beach, California
- Venue: Aviation Park
- Tagline: One Night!!! One Chance!!!

An Xtreme Pro Wrestling (XPW) reunion show called Cold Day in Hell took place on May 24, 2008, at Aviation Park in Redondo Beach, California. The event was originally going to be called "Hell Freezes Over", but was changed to "Cold Day in Hell".

In June 2007, Big Vision Entertainment, the owners of XPW, worked on MTV's Wrestling Society X which featured many XPW alumni. While working on the project, the company came up with the idea to hold an XPW reunion show. The event was produced by Kevin Kleinrock, Mike Hartsfield, and Kris Kloss. Vic Grimes was originally scheduled to be part of the event but had to drop out due to an injury.

Big Vision Entertainment released Cold Day in Hell on DVD and Blu-ray in January 2009, which included the entire event and its 45-minute pre-show.

== Event ==
=== Preliminary matches ===
The reunion show started with the first ever "Dynamite D Tribute Battle Royal". Carnage eventually lit the tape on his hand on fire and eliminated the final remaining competitors with a flaming clothesline. Carnage, after receiving the D Cup, gave it to Dynamite D's mother.

Prior to the second match, XPW held the Miss Extreme Competition, which was hosted by Joey Ryan. The participating women competed in competitions like lap dances and beer chugging. During a competition that involved being spanked with a barbed wire covered glove, Nicky "The New York Knockout" beat up the other contestants and no official winner was declared.

Kaos and Vampiro wrestled in the second match, which included Kaos being slammed onto a fluorescent light tube. Kaos ultimately won the match, with both wrestlers' backs cut and bleeding from the glass.

Prior to "The Hardcore Homo" Angel's match, he was presented with a birthday cake and presents for his 19th birthday. G. Q. Money was hiding among the gifts, attacking Angel with the help of Bo Cooper. At the conclusion of the match, Money shot a fireball at Angel to pick up the victory.

Following the Angel/Money match, J-Love forced Leroy the Ring Crew Guy to clean up the remaining glass from the Kaos/Vampiro match. Pogo The Clown came out with a shovel and beat up both Leroy and J. Love, before being stopped by a Singapore cane wielding Sandman, who then faced Pogo in a match. Sandman eventually picked up the victory after J-Love hit Pogo with a Singapore cane.

Terry Funk, the special referee for the Johnny Webb and Raven vs. Homeless Jimmy and Sabu match, announced that Sabu could not compete due to a broken vertebra in his neck and would be replaced by Concussion. Sabu, however, came to the ring during the match and, although he was removed by security, distracted Funk enough that Funk got knocked out by the wrestlers in the match. Raven and Webb ultimately picked up the victory after Webb gave Jimmy a DDT on top of a chair.

Next was the Team Rev Pro vs. Team XPW match which saw Ron Rivera, Disco Machine, and Joey Ryan of Rev Pro face Jardi Frantz, Vinnie Massaro, and X-Pac of XPW. Team XPW ultimately lost the match when Disco pinned Franz. Following the match, X-Pac hit the Bronco Buster on both Mr. McPhenom and CW Anderson.

This was followed by a three-way match which saw Luke Hawx defeat Jack Evans and Scorpio Sky.

=== Main event matches ===
In the first match of a double main event, The Gangstas (New Jack and Mustafa) were scheduled to face The Westside NGZ (Chronic and B.G. Rott). B.C. Killer and Mr. California came out instead of The Gangstas and began beating up The Westside NGZ. The Gangstas eventually came out and attacked both teams before ultimately winning the match. Following the match, New Jack announced his retirement.

The final match of the event saw Necro Butcher face Supreme for the XPW King of the Deathmatch Championship. Supreme won the match and the championship after delivering a back body drop onto a fluorescent light tube.

== Aftermath ==
A second XPW reunion show, the XPW Ten Year Anniversary Spectacular, was held on August 22, 2009.

== Results ==
No.	Results	Stipulations
1	Carnage defeated Robbie Phoenix, Stepfather, Exciter, Sexy Chino, RCG Leroy, and Youth Suicide	Dynamite D Tribute Battle Royal
2	Kaos defeated Vampiro	Grudge match
3	G. Q. Money (with Bo Cooper) defeated "The Hardcore Homo" Angel (with Kraq)	Singles match
4	The Sandman defeated Pogo The Clown	Singles match
5	Concussion and Homeless Jimmy defeated Raven and Johnny Webb	Tag team match Terry Funk served as the special guest referee for this match
6	Team Rev Pro (Ron Rivera, Disco Machine, and Joey Ryan) (with Mr. McPhenom and CW Anderson) defeated Team XPW (Jardi Frantz, Vinnie Massaro, and X-Pac)	Six-man tag team match
7	Luke Hawx defeated Jack Evans and Scorpio Sky	Three-way match
8	The Gangstas (New Jack and Mustafa) defeated The Westside NGZ (B.G. Rott and Chronic)	Tag team match
9	Supreme defeated Necro Butcher (with J.R. Benson)	Double Hell, Barbed Wire Chairs, Barbed Wire Tables, Light Tube Tables, Thumbtacks, Beds of Mouse Traps, and Beds of Light Tubes Death match for the vacant XPW King of the Deathmatch Championship
