= Perros del Mal vs. XPW =

2011 Xtreme Pro Wrestling show in Mexico

Perros del Mal vs. XPW: Xtremo y Sangriento
- Promotion(s): Xtreme Pro Wrestling; Perros del Mal
- Date: August 20, 2011
- City: Tultitlan, Mexico
- Venue: Central de Refacciones
- Attendance: 850

An Xtreme Pro Wrestling (XPW) reunion show called Perros del Mal vs. XPW: Xtremo y Sangriento, also known simply as Perros del Mal vs. XPW, was held on August 20, 2011, in Tultitlán, Mexico. This was the third XPW reunion show held since 2008 and the first to be co-promoted with Mexican lucha libre promotion Perros del Mal. The event took place at Central de Refacciones, a local junk yard.

== Event ==
=== Semi-main event match ===
In the semi-main event match, Lolita defeated Sexy Star in a 2-out-of-3 falls stripping match. The loser of each fall had to remove an article of clothing; Lolita won 2 falls to 1, forcing Sexy Star to remove her bra, although she tried to cover herself up.

=== Main event match ===
During the final match of the event, Damián 666, Bestia 666, Halloween, and X-Fly defeated Carnage, Johnny Webb, Kaos, and Supreme in an eight-man tag team extreme match. Damián earned the victory for his team after powerbombing Supreme onto light tubes. After the match, Damián announced his intentions to retire but asked for one last match against Supreme, in an electrified cage where the XPW King of the Deathmatch Championship would be on the line.

== Aftermath ==
Perros del Mal vs. XPW was the final XPW reunion show to be held. In the aftermath of the event, MEXPW, a promotion that billed itself as a successor to XPW, was founded by Damián 666 and former XPW producer Mike Hartsfield. The promotion's roster was made up of XPW alumni as well as wrestlers from the Californian and Mexican independent circuits. While Supreme and Damián would not have an electrified cage match, the two would have an electrified ropes death match on a Desastre Total Ultraviolento event for the MEXPW King of the Deathmatch Championship on July 3, 2012. MEXPW later changed its name to MEXPRO Wrestling (MPW), this was a result of legal action from Big Vision Entertainment, the-then owners of XPW. MPW ceased running events in 2013; Perros del Mal ceased running shows in 2015.

In 2012, ownership of XPW was transferred from Big Vision Entertainment to Rob Black's Extreme Gifts company. In 2021, XPW was featured on Vice's Dark Side of the Ring series. In response to the coverage from Dark Side of the Ring, Black announced in the summer of 2021 that he would be relaunching the promotion, basing it out of Rochester, New York. The first event of the revived XPW, Rebirth, was held on November 7.

== Results ==
No.	Results	Stipulations
1	Dinamic Black defeated Alan Extreme and Dragon Fly	Three-way dance
2	Drastick Boy and Tribal defeated Dinastía and Konami	Tag team match
3	Celestial and Cosmico defeated Mini Mr. Aguila and Mini Talisman	Tag team match
4	Dr. X-Treme, Ek-Balam, and Peligro defeated Black Fire, Tony Rivera, and Zumbido	Six-man tag team match
5	Lolita (with Tony Rivera) defeated Sexy Star (with Dr. X-Treme) 2 falls to 1	2-out-of-3 falls Stripping match
6	Los Perros del Mal (Damián 666, Bestia 666, Halloween, and X-Fly) defeated Carnage, Johnny Webb, Kaos, and Supreme	Eight-man tag team Extreme match
