= Extreme Rising =

Professional wrestling promotion from 2012 to 2014

- Acronym: ER
- Founded: 2012
- Defunct: 2014
- Style: Hardcore wrestling
- Headquarters: Philadelphia, Pennsylvania, USA
- Founder(s): Shane Douglas; Corky Robinson; Leonard Brand; Dave Duponte
- Formerly: Extreme Reunion
- Predecessor: Extreme Championship Wrestling

Extreme Rising (formerly Extreme Reunion) was an American independent professional wrestling promotion founded in 2012. Meant to fill the void of hardcore wrestling left behind by the defunct Extreme Championship Wrestling (ECW), Extreme Rising assembled a roster of ECW alumni, but later expanded to include younger talent. The promotion closed after cancelling all future shows on April 22, 2014.

== History ==
In January 2012, Shane Douglas announced plans for Extreme Reunion, a new promotion influenced by Extreme Championship Wrestling (ECW). Douglas cited his dissatisfaction with the state of the professional wrestling industry as his inspiration to create the new organization. To create interest for the inaugural show on April 28, Douglas undertook a guerrilla marketing campaign, which included attending the March 19, 2012, episode of WWE Raw. Douglas stood up during a match, causing cameras to cut away from him, and he was escorted out of the arena.

The inaugural event, also named Extreme Reunion, was panned by both fans and critics. The fans in attendance voiced their annoyance at the event by shouting negative chants at Douglas, who had booked himself in the main event. Former ECW Champions Sabu and Justin Credible were removed from the card on the night of Extreme Reunion for medical reasons. Douglas released a video days later, apologizing for the quality of the show, and promised changes going forward. Among the changes were altering the company name from Extreme Reunion to Extreme Rising, and bringing in younger talents, such as Matt Hardy, Homicide, Jay Bradley and Luke Hawx, as well as lucha libre wrestlers, to bolster the roster.

Extreme Rising held the Remember November internet pay-per-view (iPPV) on November 17, 2012, and the Card Subject to Change iPPV on December 29, 2012. Card Subject to Change saw Stevie Richards become Extreme Rising's first World Champion by winning a tournament final over Rhino. The company had planned to offer three shows during WrestleMania 29 weekend in April 2013, but the shows were cancelled due to poor sales. After a hiatus, Extreme Rising reorganized and announced that they would resume running live shows on December 28, 2013. Steve O'Neill took control of the promotion and said that he secured a deal that would put them on local television markets in the Philadelphia area. Extreme Rising subsequently became the first promotion to run shows in the ECW Arena after it reopened.

On April 22, 2014, Extreme Rising cancelled all upcoming events and closed their social media accounts. The cancellations came three days before a scheduled show in Philadelphia and scheduled talent said they were notified via text message. O'Neill advised those who had purchased tickets to contact their bank or credit card company to get a refund.

== Extreme Rising World Championship ==
In 2012, the fledgling promotion announced an eight-man tournament to crown their first world champion, set to include former ECW Champions Sabu and Rhino; ECW mainstays Stevie Richards, Devon Storm, and Perry Saturn; as well as notable independent wrestlers such as Homicide, Luke Hawx, and Papadon. The two-night tournament took place at the Remember November iPPV on November 17, 2012, and the Card Subject To Change iPPV on December 29, 2012, where Stevie Richards became the first champion by defeating Rhino in the finals.

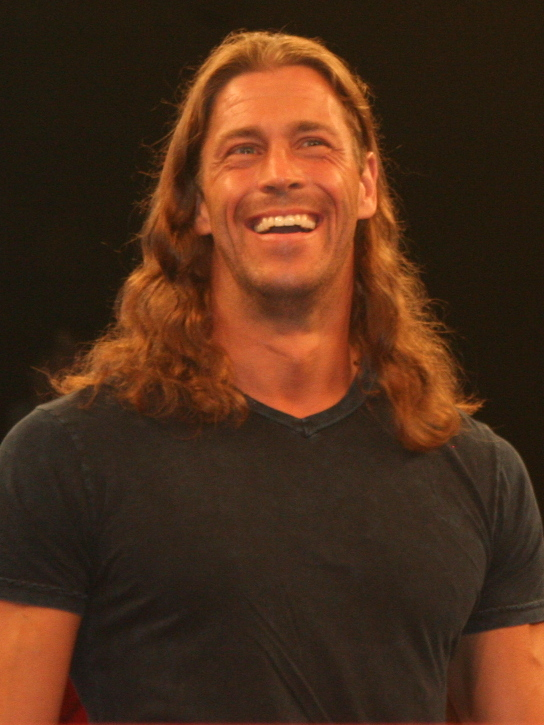
Stevie Richards was the only official champion and offered to defend it in a video game

The tournament brackets were:

Quarterfinals
Stevie Richards	Sub
Papadon
Luke Hawx	Sub
Perry Saturn
Sabu
Devon Storm	Pin
Rhino	Pin
Homicide

Semifinals
Stevie Richards	Sub
Luke Hawx
Devon Storm
Rhino	Pin

Final
Stevie Richards	Sub
Rhino

In 2013, Richards announced via Twitter that he wanted to defend the title against Danny Doring in a video game. Doring, who was one-half of the final ECW World Tag Team Champions, and still possessed the physical belt, also put his title on the line in a "defunct promotion vs. defunct promotion match". After his declarations, Extreme Rising asked Richards to return the title for referring to them as "defunct".

Despite this, Richards continued to be champion into 2014. Richards was defeated by Luke Hawx in what was billed as a title match at an East Coast Wrestling Association (ECWA) show in Delaware; however, Extreme Rising said the match was not for the title and continued to recognize Richards as champion. Despite the statement, Hawx continued to proclaim himself champion and was to defend the title against Matt Hardy on July 20, 2014, at Maryland Championship Wrestling (MCW). Extreme Rising owner Steve O'Neill issued a press release denying that they had sanctioned the match. According to Dan McDevitt of MCW, the match would be for the MCW Heavyweight Championship, but said it was up to Hardy or Hawx to bring other titles. Hawx lost to Hardy in the match, who retained the MCW Championship and obtained the Extreme Rising championship belt – but was not officially recognized as champion.

=== Title history ===
Reign	The reign number for the specific champion listed
Location	The city in which the title was won
Event	The event promoted by the respective promotion in which the title was won
†	Indicates the title changes not recognized by Extreme Rising

No.	Wrestlers	Reign	Date won	Location	Event	Days held	Notes
1	Stevie Richards	1	December 29, 2012	Philadelphia, Pennsylvania	Card Subject To Change	427	Defeated Rhino in the tournament finale. He was the only champion recognized by Extreme Rising.
2	Luke Hawx	1^{†}	March 1, 2014	Newark, Delaware	ECWA live event	140	Extreme Rising did not recognize this change.
3	Matt Hardy	1^{†}	July 19, 2014	Joppa, Maryland	MCW Shane Shamrock Memorial Cup 2014	<1	Defeated Hawx in a Tables, Ladders, and Chairs match. Officially, neither Extreme Rising nor MCW recognized the match as a title match for the Extreme Rising title, but Hardy and Hawx claimed it as a title change.
