= Tim Fischer (wrestler) =

American professional wrestler (born 1967)

Personal information
- Born: Timothy Frank Fischer; November 7, 1967 (age 58) Riverside, California, United States

Professional wrestling career
- Ring name(s): Damien Steele; Tim Fisher; Buddy West; Nick Beat
- Billed height: 6 ft 1 in (185 cm)
- Billed weight: 235 lb (107 kg)
- Billed from: Hollywood, California; Berkeley, California
- Trained by: Darren McMillan
- Debut: August 1995
- Retired: 2011

Timothy Frank Fischer (born November 7, 1967) is an American musician, comedian, writer and professional wrestler, known by his ring name "The Real Deal" Damien Steele. Fisher competed in WWE, WCW, XPW, WWC and UPW between 1995 and 2007. Fischer held the XPW World Heavyweight Championship on two occasions.

== Wrestling career ==
Fisher debuted in August 1995 and spent much of his early career wrestling on the local independent circuit in southern California under the name Nick Beat. He became a regular for the United Independent Wrestling Alliance and Southern California Championship Wrestling as well as toured the Eastern United States with the World Wrestling Association and World Xtreme Wrestling during the late 1990s.

While wrestling for Verne Langdon's Slammer's Wrestling Gym as Buddy West, he became part of Dynamite D's Dynamite World Order. Initially a parody of the New World Order, it was the last major storyline before the promotion closed.

On July 31, 1999, Fisher was attacked by Big Dick Dudley in his XPW debut which led to a feud during the summer. Teaming with Kristi Myst and Nicole Bass, Steele would eventually defeat Dudley in a steel cage match. During the match, Dudley's manager Jasmine St. Claire turned on him allowing Steele to defeat Dudley while Steele abandoned Myst for St. Claire. As "The Real Deal" Damien Steele, Fischer and St. Claire would continue feuding with Dudley and Myst facing Dudley in a series of three-way dance matches with Johnny Webb during September. On November 26, Steele became the first XPW World Heavyweight Champion when he won a battle royal eliminating John Kronus to claim the title at the promotion's first supercard Halloween in Hell in Reseda, California. He would lose the XPW Heavyweight title to Dudley at the next XPW supercard Merry X-Mas at the Hollywood's Vogue Theatre on December 18, 1999.

After Dudley was stripped of the title at XPW's Abuse of Power on January 29, 2000, Steele interfered in a match between Jake Lawless and Mike Modest for the vacant title. After Steele hit Mike Modest with a steel chair, Lawless became the new champion but sold the title to Steele, making Steele the only two-time champion in the history of XPW. Steele later lost the title to Chris Candido in a Falls Count Anywhere match at My Bloody Valentine on February 26. His matches with both Dudley and Candido were later featured in several DVDs released by the promotion, most notably, XPW: Baptized in Blood and After the Fall.

Fisher accepted the head coach position at WWE's developmental territory UPW in 2000–2001. As head trainer, Fisher trained several promising wrestlers including future WWE Champion John Cena, who wrestled his first dark match against Fisher at the Arco Arena in Sacramento, California. Fisher also trained several Pro Football Players, MMA fighters and Bodybuilders under developmental contract with WWE. Steele also wrestled for UPW, and was crowned the first UPW Internet Champion, which he voluntarily vacated six months later to challenge Christopher Daniels for the UPW Heavyweight Championship. After losing a hard-fought title match, Steele left for Puerto Rico in January 2001 for the World Wrestling Council.

While in WWC, Steele won the vacant WWC World Junior Heavyweight Championship in a 5-way tornado match with Eddie Colón, Richie Santiago, Black Boy, and Rockero in Ponce, Puerto Rico on January 5, 2001. Steele lost the title to Colon in Carolina one month later, the two feuded over the title during the next few months. Steele won the title back from Colon defeating him in Manati on February 17 and re-lost the title to him in Morovis, Puerto Rico some months later. As a member of "La Familia Nuevo Millennium", Fisher was known as a comic heel and rarely had the opportunity to work as a fan favorite. During his tenure, Steele took an unexpected two-story fall onto concrete pavement, resulting in 18 cranial and facial fractures, 3 tibial fractures, optic nerve cupping, torn meniscus and LCL, multiple contusions and lacerations on the face chest shoulders and arms. Other notable feuds included Chris Candido, Big Dick Dudley John Kronus and limited programs with Sabu, John Cena, "The Fallen Angel" Christopher Daniels, Vampiro, Konnan and Kid Kash.

At an inter-promotional show between XWF and WWC, Steele appeared at the WWC's 29th Anniversary Show where he faced Tommy Diablo, Frankie Capone and Kid Romeo in a "four corners" match at the Juan Ramón Loubriel Stadium in Bayamon, Puerto Rico on September 14, 2002. He also toured with Carlos Colón's WWC in Puerto Rico before returning to UPW in early-2002 where he became a part-time instructor at the promotion's Ultimate University wrestling school while head instructor Tom Howard toured Japan.

== Music career ==
Tim Fisher was the lead singer of SFD, a Ska band formed in Orange County, California in 1990. SFD released one CD It Came from Six Feet Deep and disbanded in 1999 before releasing 8 unrecorded tracks. SFD played a ten-year reunion show in 2008 at The Orange County International Street fair, and further reunion shows and recordings are planned for 2012. Several songs from It Came from Six Feet Deep are being featured in the upcoming low-budget indie drama Rudeboy set in the 1980s Orange County ska, rude boy and scooterboy subculture, written and produced by former SFD trumpet player and vocalist, Oliver Zavala.

== Championships and accomplishments ==
- !Bang!
  - Bang Premium Championship (1 time)
  - Bang Hardcore Championship (1 time)
  - Bang Tag Team Championships (1 time) - with Johnny Romano
- Funkin’ Conservatory
  - FC European Championship (1 time)
  - FC Hardcore Championship (1 time)
  - FC Tag Team Championships (1 time) - with Chris Mayfield
- Pro Wrestling Illustrated
  - Ranked No. 332 of the 500 top wrestlers of the PWI 500 in 1999
- Ultimate Pro Wrestling
  - UPW Internet Championship (1 time)
- Georgia Championship Wrestling
  - GCW United States Junior Heavyweight Championship (1 time)
  - GCW United States Television Championship (2 times)
- Ultimate Pro Wrestling
  - UPW Internet Championship (1 time)
- Xtreme Pro Wrestling
  - XPW World Heavyweight Championship (2 times)
- World Wrestling Council
  - WWC World Junior Heavyweight Championship (2 times)
