= XPW World Tag Team Championship =

Professional wrestling tag team championship

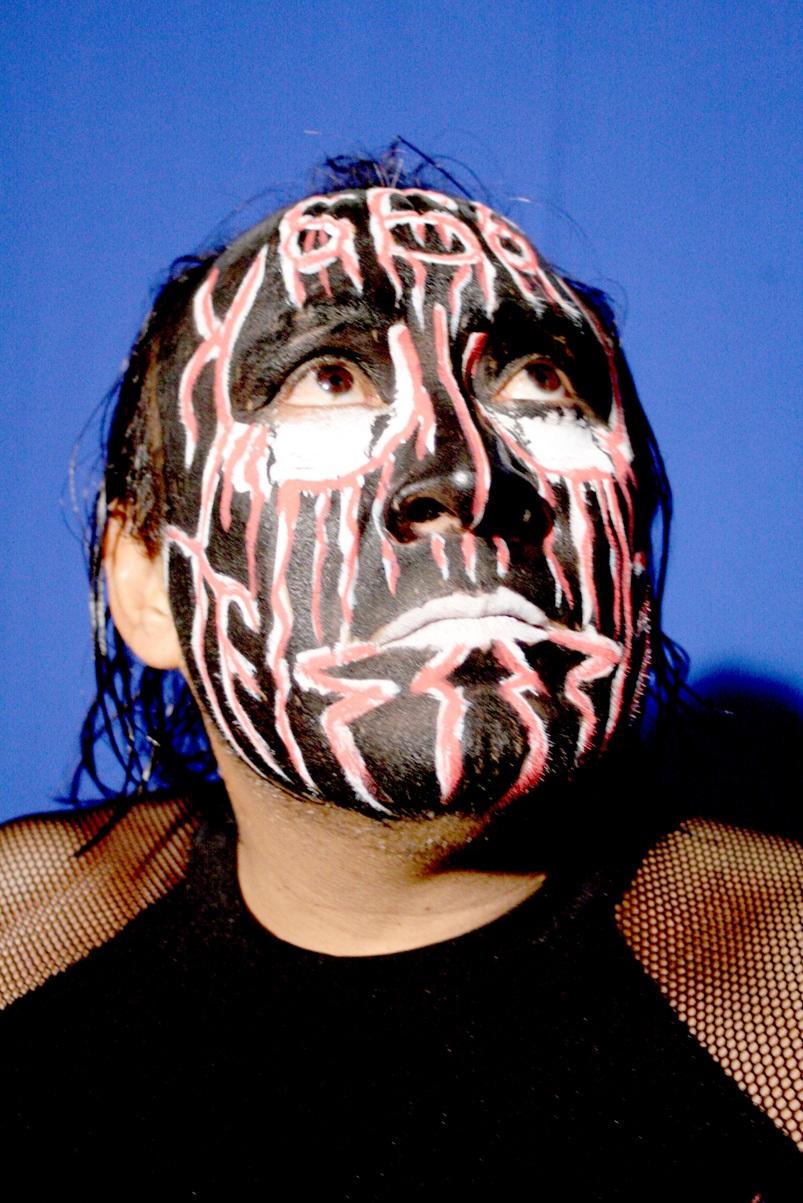
- Damián 666, part of Mexico's most wanted

Details
- Promotion: Xtreme Pro Wrestling
- Date established: July 20, 2002
- Date retired: November 7, 2021
Statistics
- First champions: Mexico's Most Wanted (Halloween and Damián 666)
- Final champions: Youthanazia (Josh Prohibition and M-Dogg 20)

The XPW World Tag Team Championship was a world tag team championship in the Xtreme Pro Wrestling promotion.

The championship was introduced at Baptized in Blood III in 2002 and its inaugural champions were decided in a Fatal 4-Way Elimination tag team match that featured Mexico's Most Wanted (Halloween and Damián 666), The New Panthers (K. Malik Shabazz and Raphael Muhammed), the team of Pogo The Clown and Juantastico, and the team of American Wild Child and Shady. Only three teams would end up holding the XPW World Tag Team Championship, with two teams holding the titles on two occasions. Luke Hawx and Scorpio Sky were the final champions.

== Title history ==
#	Wrestlers	Reign	Date	Days held	Location	Event	Notes	Ref.
1	Mexico's Most Wanted (Halloween and Damián 666)	1	July 20, 2002	154	Pico Rivera, California	Baptized In Blood III: Night Of Champions	Defeated American Wild Child and Shady, Juantastico and Pogo The Clown, and The New Panthers (K. Malik Shabazz and Raphael Muhammed) in a Fatal 4-Way Elimination tag team match to become the first champions.	
2	Youthanazia (Josh Prohibition and M-Dogg 20)	1	December 21, 2002	27	Philadelphia, Pennsylvania	Merry F'N X-Mas		
3	Mexico's Most Wanted (Halloween and Damián 666)	2	January 17, 2003	1	Philadelphia, Pennsylvania	New Years Revolution 3		
4	Youthanazia (Josh Prohibition and M-Dogg 20)	2	January 18, 2003	49	Philadelphia, Pennsylvania	Live event		
-	Deactivated	-	March 8, 2003	N/A	N/A	N/A	XPW closes and the title is abandoned.	
5	Luke Hawx and Scorpio Sky	1	August 22, 2009	4460	Los Angeles, California	Ten Year Anniversary Spectacular	Luke Hawx and Scorpio Sky defeated M-Dogg 20 and Tool to win the vacant championship.	
-	Deactivated	-	November 7, 2021	N/A	N/A	N/A	XPW relaunches but the championship was not revived.	

== List of combined reigns ==
=== By Team ===
Rank	Team	Number of reigns	Combined days
1	Luke Hawx and Scorpio Sky	1	4460
2	Mexico's Most Wanted (Halloween and Damián 666)	2	155
3	Youthanazia (Josh Prohibition and M-Dogg 20)	2	76

=== By wrestler ===
Rank	Wrestler	Number of reigns	Combined days
1	Luke Hawx	1	4460
1	Scorpio Sky	1	4460
2	Halloween	2	155
2	Damián 666	2	155
3	Josh Prohibition	2	76
3	M-Dogg 20	2	76
