= Halloween (wrestler) =

Mexican professional wrestler

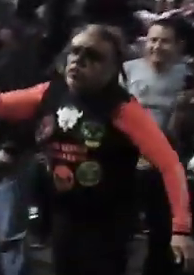
- Halloween in 2019

Personal information
- Born: Manuel Ortiz Partida; May 22, 1971 (age 55) Tijuana, Baja California, Mexico

Professional wrestling career
- Ring name(s): Ciclope; Cyclope; Halloween; Elvis González; Rocky Boy; El Giro
- Billed height: 1.75 m (5 ft 9 in)
- Billed weight: 94 kg (207 lb)
- Billed from: Tijuana, Baja California, Mexico
- Trained by: Rey Misterio; Fobia
- Debut: April 3, 1987
- Retired: April 17, 2021

Manuel Ortiz Partida (born May 22, 1971) is a Mexican retired professional wrestler, better known by the ring name Halloween. He is also known for his appearances with World Championship Wrestling as Ciclope from 1996 to 1999.

== Professional wrestling career ==
Partida debuted in 1987. In the early-1990s, he adopted the ring name "Halloween" which he would use for most of his career.

In 1996, Ortiz joined World Championship Wrestling where he took the name "Ciclope". His biggest moment in wrestling was part of the feud between Chris Jericho and Dean Malenko. Malenko, who had been inactive for a few months prior, dressed up as Ciclope to win a Cruiserweight battle royale to determine the number one contendership to Chris Jericho's WCW Cruiserweight Championship. Jericho had been refusing to grant Malenko contendership, making the disguise necessary.

After his time in World Championship Wrestling was over, he lost the Ciclope mask to Antifaz del Norte early in 1999. He quickly reverted to his Halloween character but lost his mask again on December 24, 1999, in a match against Super Parka.

In 2002, Halloween joined Consejo Mundial de Lucha Libre in Mexico City along with La Familia de Tijuana (a group consisting of himself, Damián 666, Nicho el Millonario, Rey Misterio, Sr. and their valet Lady Victoria, although Rey did not come for the tour). The trio won the National Trios title but Nicho had a falling out with management and La Familia soon left entirely. They continued to work for independent promoters until CMLL called them back in 2005 to wrestle against Negro Casas, Heavy Metal and Felino on a show celebrating Negro's 25 years of wrestling. Perro Aguayo, Jr. recruited him and Damián for his Los Perros del Mal group. However, Halloween suffered a leg injury and his role was minimalized. After Universo 2000 used the illegal martinete on Damián 666, Halloween challenged Univeso to a hair vs. hair match on the December 2 show. After losing the match and his hair, Halloween underwent knee surgery that put him out of action for several months after which he was released from CMLL.

In 2009, Halloween joined Aguayo's Perros del Mal Producciones, where he reunited with Damián 666. In June 2010, Halloween became a major part of a storyline, where Los Perros del Mal invaded AAA. On June 18, 2011, at Triplemanía XIX, Halloween, Damián 666 and X-Fly defeated Los Psycho Circus in a tournament final to become the first ever AAA World Trios Champions. On July 31 at Verano de Escándalo, Los Perros del Mal faced Los Psycho Circus in a steel cage match, where the last person left in the cage would lose either his hair or mask. The match ended with Psycho Clown escaping the cage, leaving X-Fly inside and forcing him to have his hair shaved off. On October 9 at Héroes Inmortales, Los Perros del Mal and Los Psycho Circus ended their year long rivalry, when Halloween, Damián 666 and Nicho el Millonario were defeated in a Masks vs. Hairs steel cage match and were all shaved bald. After a five-month break from the rivalry, Los Perros del Mal lost the AAA World Trios Championship to Los Psycho Circus on March 11, 2012. The following day, Halloween, Damián 666 and X-Fly announced that they had quit Los Perros del Mal.

On March 13, 2012, Halloween, Bestia 666, Damián 666, Super Nova and X-Fly announced that they were forming La Familia de Tijuana, a group of independent wrestlers, much like Los Perros del Mal, with the exception that they were not looking to form their own promotion. On March 29, International Wrestling Revolution Group (IWRG) was officially announced as La Familia de Tijuana's new home promotion. Afterwards, Halloween was the only member of La Familia de Tijuana, who kept appearing on AAA events. After initially teasing dissension with El Hijo del Perro Aguayo, Halloween reunited with Los Perros del Mal on April 1. On April 19, Halloween officially severed his ties with the rest of La Familia de Tijuana and returned to Los Perros del Mal. On August 5 at Triplemanía XX, Halloween reunited with former partner Extreme Tiger for one night to take part in a Parejas Suicidas steel cage match, featuring three other former tag teams. However, both Halloween and Tiger managed to escape the cage and avoid having to face each other in a Hair vs. Mask match. In late 2012, Halloween started a romance storyline with Mari Apache, which led to the two winning the AAA World Mixed Tag Team Championship on October 7. Later, in the main event of the same evening, Halloween lost his hair to Dark Cuervo in an eight man tag team Domo de la Muerte. Halloween and Apache lost the AAA World Mixed Tag Team Championship to Drago and Faby Apache on July 19, 2013.

== Championships and accomplishments ==
- Consejo Mundial de Lucha Libre
  - Mexican National Trios Championship (2 times) – with Damián 666 and Psicosis (1 time) and Damián 666 and Mr. Águila (1 time)
- DTU Lucha Profesional Mexicana
  - DTU Consagrado Championship (1 time)
- Lucha Libre AAA World Wide
  - AAA World Trios Championship (1 time) – with Damián 666 and X-Fly
  - AAA World Mixed Tag Team Championship (1 time) – with Mari Apache
  - AAA World Tag Team Championship (1 time) – with Extreme Tiger
  - Baja California Light Heavyweight Championship (1 time)
  - IWC Middleweight Championship (1 time)
- Nueva Generacion Xtrema
  - NGX World Tag Team Championship (1 time) – with Damián 666
- Perros del Mal Producciones
  - Copa Perros del Mal Extremo (2011)
- Pro Wrestling Illustrated
  - PWI ranked him # 89 of the 500 best singles wrestlers of the PWI 500 in 2006.
- Revolution Pro Wrestling
  - Revolution Pro World Tag Team Championship (1 time) – with Damián 666
- World Wrestling Association
  - WWA World Junior Light Heavyweight Championship (1 time)
- World Wrestling Organization
  - WWO Tag Team Championship (1 time) – with Damián 666
- Xtreme Latin American Wrestling
  - XLAW Tag Team Championship (2 times) – with Damián 666
- Xtreme Pro Wrestling
  - XPW World Tag Team Championship (2 time) – with Damián 666

== Luchas de Apuestas record ==
Winner (wager)	Loser (wager)	Location	Event	Date	Notes
Halloween (mask)	León Negro (mask)	Tijuana, Baja California	Live event	January 18, 1996	
Halloween (mask)	León Negro (mask)	San Luis Río Colorado, Sonora	Live event	January 26, 1996	(Note: Triangle match that included Damián 666)
Halloween (mask)	Thunderbird (mask)	Tijuana, Baja California	Live event	October 18, 1996	
Antifaz del Norte (mask)	Ciclope (mask)	Nuevo Laredo, Tamaulipas	Live event	1999	
Halloween (hair)	Super Parka (hair)	Tijuana, Baja California	Live event	October 15, 1999	(Note: Hair vs. hair between two masked wrestlers.)
Halloween (hair)	Super Muñeco (hair)	Tijuana, Baja California	Live event	November 26, 1999	(Note: Hair vs. hair between two masked wrestlers)
Halloween (mask)	La Máscara (Note: This was not the current La Máscara) (hair)	Nuevo Laredo, Tamaulipas	Live event	December 6, 1999	
Super Parka (mask)	Halloween (mask)	Tijuana, Baja California	Live event	December 24, 1999	
Damián 666 (hair)	Halloween (hair)	Tijuana, Baja California	Live event	June 29, 2001	
Halloween (hair)	Bestia Salvaje (hair)	Tijuana, Baja California	Live event	March 15, 2002	(Note: Los Guapos vs. La Familia de Tijuana hair match.)
Halloween (hair)	Brazo de Plata (hair)	Tijuana, Baja California	Live event	June 25, 2004	
Shocker (hair)	Halloween (hair)	Tijuana, Baja California	Live event	September 10, 2004	
Universo 2000 (hair)	Halloween (hair)	Mexico City	Juicio Final	December 2, 2005	
Super Nova (mask)	Halloween (hair)	Tijuana, Baja California	Live event	May 5, 2010	(Note: Steel cage match that also included Damián 666, Lizmark, Jr., El Hijo de LA Park, Groon XXX and El Oriental)
Halloween (hair)	Coco Rojo (hair)	Tlalnepantla de Baz, State of Mexico	Live event	July 10, 2011	(Note: Steel cage match, where Los Perros del Mal (Halloween, Damián 666 and Ek Balam) faced Los Payasos Tricolor (Coco Rojo, Coco Azul and Coco Amarillo) and Los Psycho Circus (Monster Clown, Murder Clown and Psycho Clown).)
Los Psycho Circus (masks) (Monster Clown, Murder Clown and Psycho Clown)	Los Perros del Mal (hair) (Halloween, Damián 666 and Nicho el Millonario)	Monterrey, Nuevo León	Héroes Inmortales	October 9, 2011	(Note: Steel cage Masks vs. Hairs match.)
Dark Cuervo (hair)	Halloween (hair)	San Luis Potosí, San Luis Potosí	Héroes Inmortales	October 7, 2012	(Note: Domo de la Muerte, where Los Perros del Mal (Halloween, El Hijo del Perro Aguayo, Psicosis and Teddy Hart) faced Dark Cuervo, Cibernético, Dark Ozz and Jack Evans.)
