= XPW King of the Deathmatch Championship =

Professional wrestling championship

Details
- Promotion: Xtreme Pro Wrestling
- Date established: June 20, 2000
Statistics
- First champion: Supreme
- Final champion: Homeless Jimmy
- Most reigns: Supreme (5 reigns)
- Longest reign: Supreme (462 days)
- Shortest reign: Supreme / Altar Boy Luke (77 days)

The XPW King of the Deathmatch Championship was one of Xtreme Pro Wrestling's championships. Originally, the championship existed as a trophy at stake in the first-ever Baptized in Blood event, featuring a Japanese-style 8-Man King of the Deathmatch tournament.

== Background ==
After The Messiah defeated Supreme for the championship, an actual title belt for the championship would later appear and debut at XPW's Baptized in Blood 2. The Messiah would wind up as the longest reigning champion, holding onto the title for nearly a year, and only being stripped of the title after he was fired from XPW.

The championship was highly contested while XPW was based on the West Coast, as matches would often consist of a plethora of Barbed-Wire, Beds of Nails, Beds of Thumbtacks, Light Bulbs and (occasionally) exploding barbed-wire devices.

=== My Bloody Valentine 2000 ===
First Round
1	Supreme	1
8	Kid Kaos
4	Messiah	2
5	Johnny Webb
2	Kronus	3
7	Carlito Montana
3	Axl Rotten	4
6	Homeless Jimmy

Semifinals
Supreme	5
Messiah
Kronus	6
Axl Rotten

Final
Supreme	7
Kronus

1. Bed of Nails, Barbed Wire Board & Barbed Wire Table Match
2. Barbed Wire Ladder & Thumbtacks Match
3. Bed of Light Bulbs & Barbed Wire Board Match
4. Beds of Nails, Glass & Barbed Wire Bat Match
5. Beds of Barbed Wire, Thumbtacks & Nails Match
6. Barbed Wire Board & Barbed Wire Bat Match
7. No Rope Barbed Wire, Beds of Everything Match

=== My Bloody Valentine 2001 ===
First Round
1	Messiah	1
8	Kraq
4	Homeless Jimmy	2
5	John Kronus
2	Supreme	3
7	Steve Rizzono & Pogo the Clown
3	Johnny Webb	4
6	Nosawa

Semifinals
Messiah	5
Homeless Jimmy
Supreme	6
Johnny Webb

Final
Messiah	7
Supreme

1. Beds of Barbed Wire & Nails Match
2. Beds of Light Tubes/Light Bulbs & Broken Glass Match
3. Bed of Thumbtacks, Barbed Wire Board & Barbed Wire Table Match
4. Bed of Thumbtacks & Barbed Wire Ladder Match
5. Beds of Light Bulbs, Broken Glass & Barbed Wire Board Match
6. Beds of Barbed Wire, Thumbtacks & Nails Match
7. Double Hell, Beds of Thumbtacks, Broken Glass, Light Tubes, Barbed Wire Light Tube Tables, Barbed Wire Ladder & 16-Feet Ladder Match

=== Baptized In Blood III: Night Of Champions ===
First Round
1	Supreme	1
8	The Sandman
4	Altar Boy Luke	2
5	Vinny Massaro
2	Pogo the Clown	3
7	Steve Rizzono
3	Angel	4
6	G. Q. Money

Semifinals
Supreme	5
Altar Boy Luke
Angel	6
Pogo The Clown

Final
Supreme	7
Angel

1. Barbed Wire Ropes, Beds of Barbed Wire, Nails, Barbed Wire Board, Barbed Wire Ladder & Fans Bring The Weapons Match
2. Barbed Wire Ropes, Beds of Barbed Wire, Nails, Barbed Wire Board, Barbed Wire Ladder & Fans Bring The Weapons Match
3. Barbed Wire Ropes, Beds of Barbed Wire, Nails, Barbed Wire Board, Barbed Wire Ladder & Fans Bring The Weapons Match (this match was supposed to be Steve Rizzono vs. Crimson, but Pogo the Clown interjected himself into the match and pinned Rizzono while Crimson was outside the ring)
4. Barbed Wire Ropes, Beds of Barbed Wire, Nails, Barbed Wire Board, Barbed Wire Ladder & Fans Bring The Weapons Match
5. Barbed Wire Ropes, Beds of Barbed Wire, Nails, Barbed Wire Board, Barbed Wire Ladder & Fans Bring The Weapons Match
6. Barbed Wire Ropes, Beds of Barbed Wire, Nails, Barbed Wire Board, Barbed Wire Ladder & Fans Bring The Weapons Match
7. Barbed Wire Ropes, Beds of Light Tubes, Nails, Barbed Wire Board, Barbed Wire Table, Barbed Wire Ladder, Fans Bring The Weapons & Exploding Ring Scaffold Match

== Title history ==
Key
No.	Overall reign number
Reign	Reign number for the specific champion
N/A	The information is not available or is unknown

No.	Champion	Championship change			Reign statistics		Notes	Ref.
No.	Champion	Date	Event	Location	Reign	Days	Notes	Ref.
1	Supreme	February 26, 2000	My Bloody Valentine - Night 2	Hollywood, CA	1	259	Defeated John Kronus in a No Rope, Barbed Wire, Beds of Everything Match in a tournament final to become the first champion.	
2	The Messiah	November 11, 2000	Dismembered In November	San Bernardino, CA	1	287	This was a Barbed Wire Ropes, Beds of Tumbtacks, Light Bulls, Nails, Barbed Wire Board, Light Tube, Caribbean Spider Web match.	
-	Vacated	August 25, 2001	N/A	N/A	-	N/A	Messiah was fired from XPW, and the title is vacated.	
3	Supreme	October 13, 2001	Halloween In Hell II	Pico Rivera, CA	2	133	Defeated Vic Grimes in a Double Hell, Barbed Wire Landmines, Bed of Lights tubes Match to win the vacant title.	
4	The Sandman	February 23, 2002	Freefall	Los Angeles, CA	1	147	This was a Beds of Thumbtacks, Barbed Wire, Nails, Barbed Wire Board match.	
5	Supreme	July 20, 2002	Baptized In Blood III: Night of Champions	Pico Rivera, CA	3	77	Defeated Angel in a Exploding Ring Scaffold match in a tournament final.	
6	Altar Boy Luke	October 5, 2002	Fallout	Philadelphia	1	77	This was a Bed of Light Tubes, Barbed Wire Board match.	
7	Supreme	December 21, 2002	Merry F'N X-Mas	Philadelphia	4	77	This was a House of Horrors match.	
-	Deactivated	March 8, 2003	N/A	N/A	-	N/A	XPW closed and the title was abandoned.	
8	Supreme	May 24, 2008	Cold Day In Hell	Redondo Beach, CA	5	455	Defeated Necro Butcher in a Double Hell, Barbed Wire Chairs, Barbed Wire Light Tube Tables, Light Tube Table, Thumbtacks, Beds of Mouse Traps and Light Tubes Death match to reactivate the title.	
-	Deactivated	August 22, 2009	N/A	N/A	-	N/A	The title was retired after XPW's Ten Year Anniversary Spectacular event.	
9	Shlak	April 9th, 2022	Killafornia	Pomona, CA	1	666	Defeated Masada in the finals of the King of the Deathmatch tournament in a No Ropes Barbed Wire Death Match to win the vacant title.	
10	Homeless Jimmy	February 25, 2024	Aive and Kicking	Newark, NJ	1	195		

== Combined reigns ==
Rank	Wrestler	No. of reigns	Combined days
1	Supreme (wrestler)	5	1001
2	The Messiah	1	287
3	Shlak	1	197
4	The Sandman	1	147
5	Altar Boy Luke	1	77

== See also ==
- IWA King of the Death Match
- IWA Mid-South King of the Deathmatch
- Combat Zone Wrestling's Tournament of Death
