= XPW World Heavyweight Championship =

Professional wrestling championship

Details
- Promotion: Xtreme Pro Wrestling
- Date established: October 29, 1999
- Current champion: Eric Ryan
- Date won: April 13, 2024
Statistics
- First champion: Damien Steele
- Most reigns: Damien Steele (2 reigns)
- Longest reign: Sabu (392 days)
- Shortest reign: Jake Lawless (<1 days)

The XPW World Heavyweight Championship is a professional wrestling world heavyweight championship in the Xtreme Pro Wrestling promotion. Eric Ryan is the current champion in his first reign. He won the title by defeating Shlak at Baptized in Blood on April 13, 2024 in Los Angeles, California.

== Title history ==
As of November 18, 2026, there have been fourteen reigns between thirteen champions, two vacancies and one deactivation. Damien Steele was the inaugural and record two-time champion. Sabu holds the longest reign at 392 days, while Jake Lawless has shortest reign at less than a day.

Key
No.	Overall reign number
Reign	Reign number for the specific champion
Days	Number of days held
<1	Reign lasted less than a day
+	Current reign is changing daily

No.	Champion	Championship change			Reign statistics		Notes	Ref.
No.	Champion	Date	Event	Location	Reign	Days	Notes	Ref.
1	Damien Steele	October 29, 1999	Halloween in Hell	Reseda, CA	1	50	Steele won a nine-man battle royal to become the first champion.	
2	Big Dick Dudley	December 18, 1999	Merry X-Mas	Hollywood, CA	1	42		
—	Vacated	January 29, 2000	—	—	—	—	Dudley was stripped of the championship when his parole officer refused to let him compete.	
3	Jake Lawless	January 29, 2000	Abuse of Power	Hollywood, CA	1	<1	Defeated Michael Modest to win the vacant title.	
4	Damien Steele	January 29, 2000	Abuse of Power	Hollywood, CA	2	28	Steele purchased the title from Lawless.	
5	Chris Candido	February 26, 2000	My Bloody Valentine	Hollywood, CA	1	63	This was a Falls Count Anywhere match.	
—	Vacated	April 29, 2000	—	—	—	—	Candido was stripped of the title when he signed with World Championship Wrestling.	
6	Sabu	April 29, 2000	XPW Heavyweight Title Tournament	Bakersfield, CA	1	392	Defeated The Messiah in the finals of a one-night tournament to win the vacant title.	
7	The Messiah	May 26, 2001	Redemption	Los Angeles, CA	1	91	Defeated New Jack to win the title. New Jack was not the champion and was appointed by Josh Lazie to substitute Sabu, who was the champion and was not present at the event.	
—	Vacated	August 25, 2001	—	—	—	—	Messiah was stripped of the title when he was fired from XPW.	
8	Johnny Webb	August 25, 2001	Damage Inc.	Los Angeles, CA	1	329	Webb and Rob Black defeated Sabu and Josh Lazie in a tag team match. Webb won the title as per the stipulation of the match.	
9	Shane Douglas	July 20, 2002	Baptized In Blood III: Night Of Champions	Pico Rivera, CA	1	231		
—	Deactivated	March 8, 2003	—	—	—	—	XPW closed and the title was abandoned	
10	Brian Cage	November 7, 2021	Rebirth	Rochester, NY	1	280	Defeated Willie Mack in the finals of a one-night tournament to win the vacant title.	
11	Masada	August 13, 2022	Night of Reckoning	Pomona, CA	1	287	Defeated Brian Cage and Willie Mack in a three-way dance.	
12	Alex Colon	May 27, 2023	Broken Beat And Scarred	Newark, NJ	1	126		
13	Shlak	September 30, 2023	South Of Heaven	Newark, NJ	1	196		
14	Eric Ryan	April 13, 2024	Baptized In Blood IV	Los Angeles, CA	1	949+		

== Combined reigns ==
As of November 18, 2026.

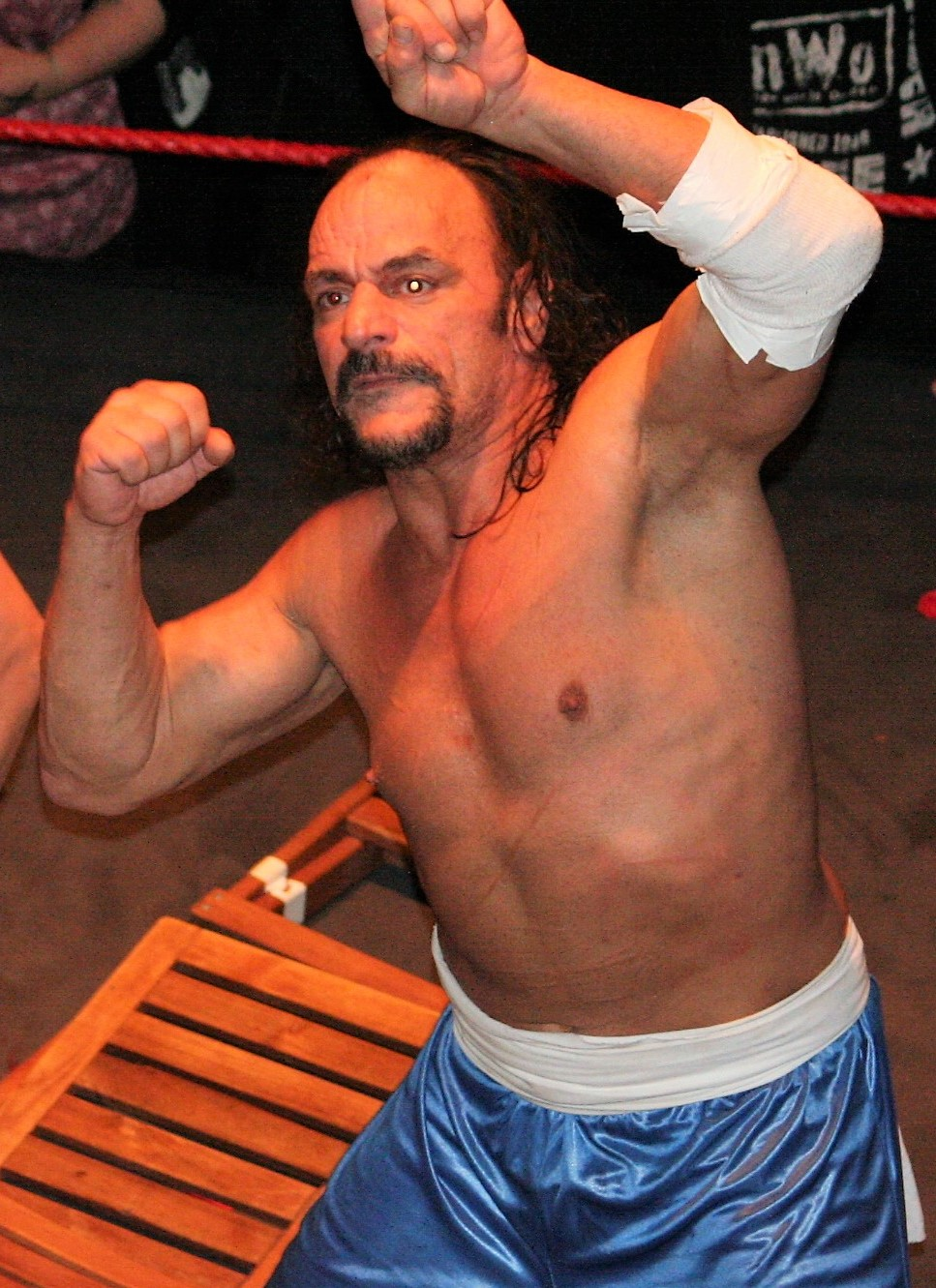
Sabu has the longest reign, with 392 days.

†	Indicates the current champion

Rank	Wrestler	No. of reigns	Combined days
1	Sabu	1	392
2	Eric Ryan †	1	949+
3	Johnny Webb	1	329
4	Masada	1	287
5	Brian Cage	1	280
6	Shane Douglas	1	231
7	Shlak	1	196
8	Alex Colon	1	126
9	The Messiah	1	91
10	Damien Steele	2	78
11	Chris Candido	1	63
12	Big Dick Dudley	1	42
13	Jake Lawless	1	<1
