= Lizzy Valentine =

American professional wrestler, valet, model, jazz musician, and actress

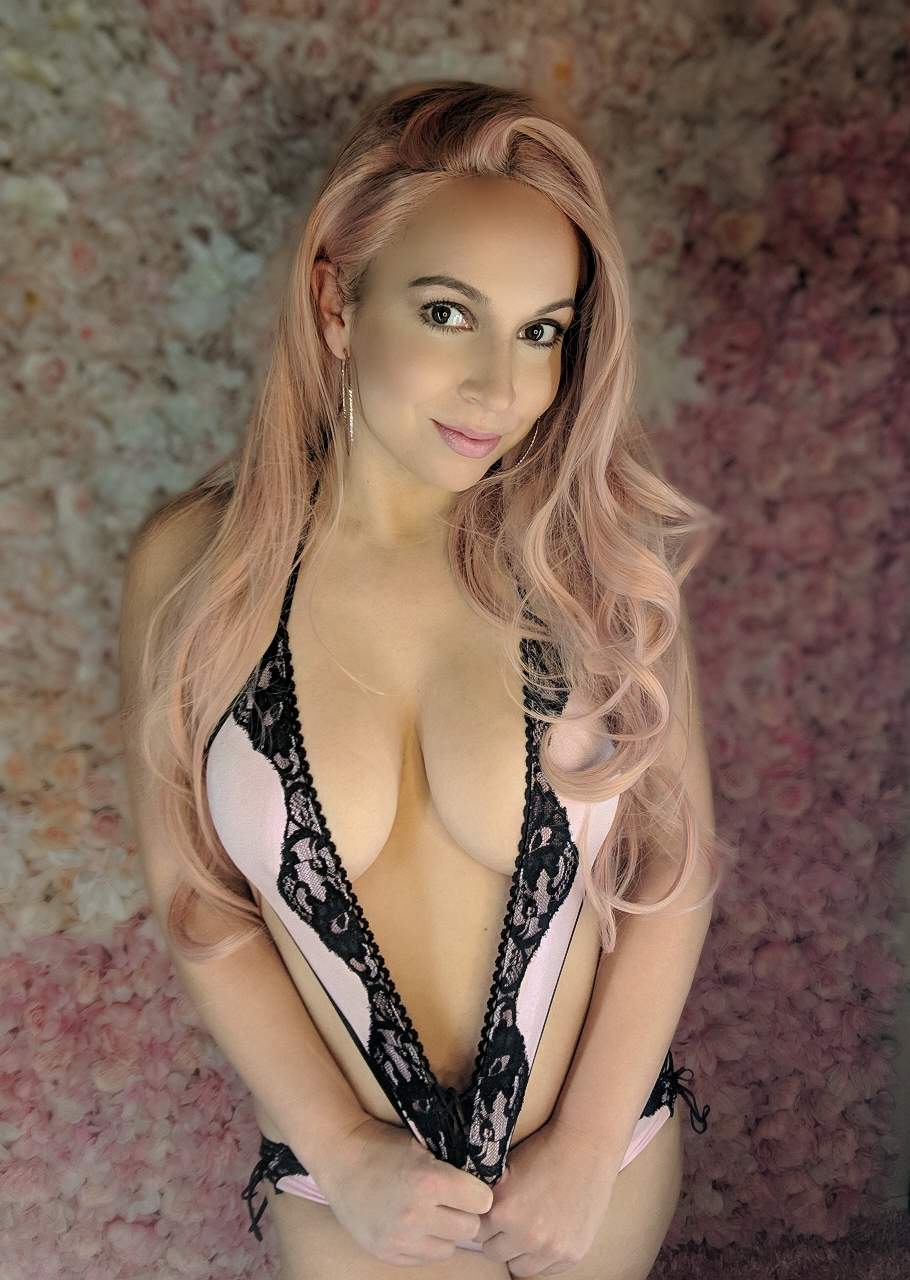
- Lizzy Valentine in 2018

Personal information
- Born: August 10, 1983 (age 42) New York, New York, U.S.

Professional wrestling career
- Ring name(s): Cheerleader Valentina; Jersey Jean; Jordan; JV Love; J-Love; Kandi Kisses; Lizzy Valentine; Lizzy Valentine Carter; Miss Led; Valentina Laree; Valentina; VJ Love
- Billed height: 5 ft 4 in (1.63 m)
- Billed weight: 120 lb (54 kg; 8.6 st)
- Trained by: Homicide
- Debut: 2000
- Retired: 2012

Elizabeth Miklosi (born August 10, 1983), known professionally as Lizzy Valentine, is an American former professional wrestler, valet, model, and actress. She is best known for her work on MTV's Wrestling Society X.

== Professional wrestling career ==
Valentine was trained by Homicide and began her career under the ring name Miss Led with the Long Island Wrestling Federation and the Northeast independent circuit. She also appeared in numerous other independent wrestling promotions, managing multiple wrestlers and feuding with multiple others.

=== Independent circuit (2000–2010) ===
In Jersey All Pro Wrestling (JAPW), she managed Dixie and had her first professional match against April Hunter. She also managed Nick Berk and Z-Barr in Liberty All-Star Wrestling in Philadelphia and NWA Florida. Valentine had a career long feud with Alexis Laree. The two faced each other up and down the East Coast in KAPOW!, Southern Championship Wrestling, and Dangerous Women of Wrestling. Valentine has also teamed with the Ballard Brothers in various promotions. She even toured Alaska and wrestled matches for the troops in the Middle East. As J-Love, she feuded with Pogo the Clown in Xtreme Pro Wrestling (XPW).

In 2005, Valentine debuted for Ultimate Pro Wrestling in California and began managing Pro Wrestling Guerrilla's world champion Adam Pearce. Miklosi then auditioned for the 2005 Diva Search held by World Wrestling Entertainment; however, she was not selected as a finalist.

Miklosi appeared on Lucha Libre USA under the ring name Lizzy Valentine Carter. She was a member of The Right with R. J. Brewer and Petey Williams.

=== Total Nonstop Action Wrestling ===
Valentine had a brief stint as a TNA Knockout in Total Nonstop Action Wrestling (TNA). She first competed as JV Love on TNA Xplosion in a match against Tracy Brooks. She had a spot during the match where she flipped Brooks down to the mat by the hair. She was then repackaged as a new character named Cheerleader Valentina and replaced Brooks as the partner of Nurse Veronica in the all-female stable known as Bitchslap. In their first appearance together, they attacked the TNA cage dancers during a dance routine, but were separated by TNA security. A match was finally scheduled between Veronica and Valentine and the TNA cage dancers (April Pennington and Lollipop). However, before the match could fully start, it was interrupted by Trinity, who revealed herself as the newest member of Bitchslap and attacked Pennington and Lollipop. The TNA cage dancers retaliated against Bitchslap the following week. They summoned Bitchslap to the ring; however, Trinity forced Veronica and Valentine into the ring to fight the cage dancers. Pennington and Lollipop attacked Veronica and Valentine with leather straps, until they fled up the entrance ramp to rejoin Trinity.

The storyline with Bitchslap was then dropped because TNA didn't have enough female wrestlers to compete against the group, and Ronnie Stevens turned down a two-year contract with TNA, instead attempting to sign with either WWE or a company in Japan. Brooks and Trinity were then placed into other storylines and TNA stopped booking Miklosi.

On December 21, 2009, at the tapings of Impact!, Valentine defeated Amber O'Neal in a tryout dark match.

=== Wrestling Society X ===
In 2006, Valentine performed in the short-lived MTV wrestling series Wrestling Society X. She was the valet and on-screen girlfriend of Matt Sydal, and worked as a heel.

On the July 29 episode of Wrestling Society X, Sydal defeated Human Tornado, after interference from Valentine. Valentine accompanied Sydal to the ring where he defeated Scorpio Sky, and after the match, Valentine wrote "Hater" on his back. Sydal began a feud with Syxx-Pac over Valentine, but WSX folded before they ever had a match.

=== Wrestlicious (2009–2010) ===
In early 2009, she took part in the first season tapings of Wrestlicious, which started airing in March 2010, using the character of Kandi Kisses, known as "The Britney Spears of Wrestling." She made her debut on March 1 of the first episode of Takedown, performing her new song but was caught lip syncing, causing the fans to turn on her, turning her heel in the process. She made her singles debut on May 26 in the main event of Takedown, facing Lil' Slamm in a singles match, where she lost via pinfall.

=== Juggalo Championship Wrestling (2012) ===
After a year away from wrestling, Valentine made two appearances for Juggalo Championship Wrestling (JCW). The first was on July 7, 2012 during the Road to Bloodymania 6 show, where she lost in a singles match against Randy the Ring Girl. The second was on August 11 at Oddball Wrestling, where she was involved in a five on one handicap elimination match, which was won by Kongo Kong.

== Championships and accomplishments ==
- KAPOW!
  - KAPOW! Women's Championship (1 time)
- Ultimate Pro Wrestling
  - UPW Women's Championship (1 time)
