= Damián 666 =

Mexican professional wrestler

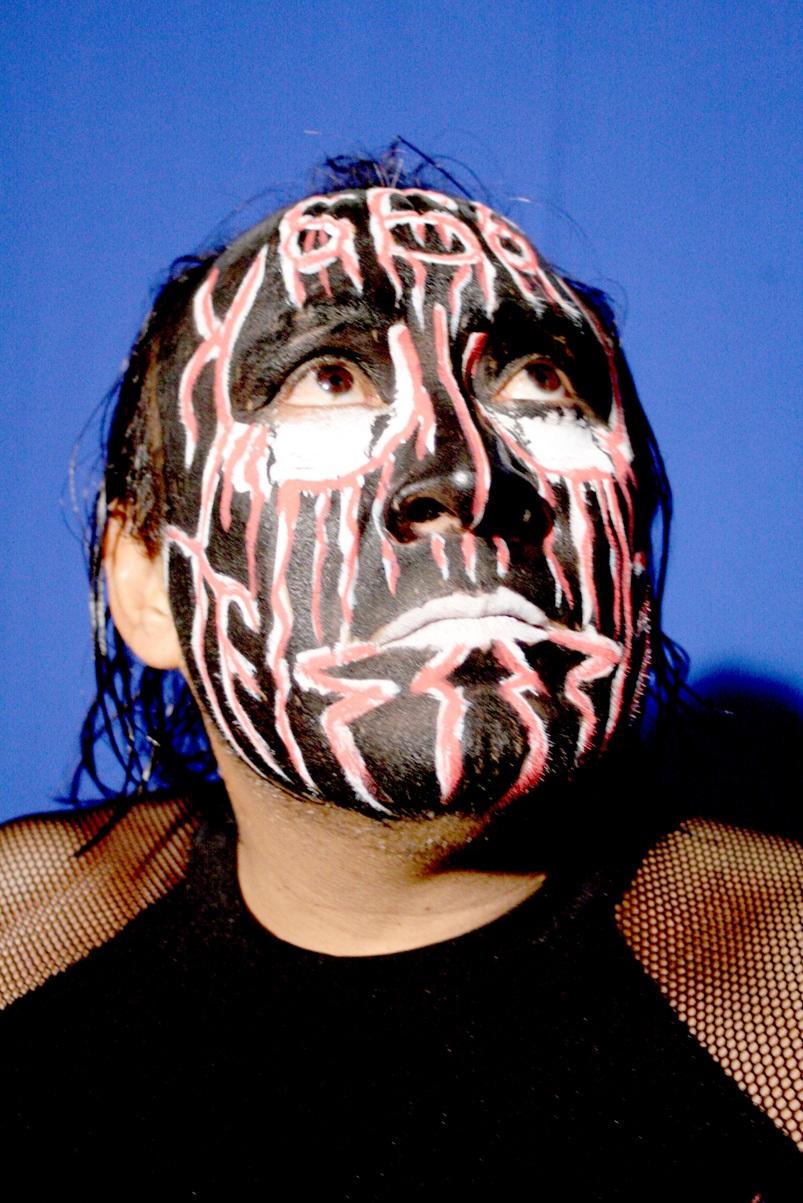
- Gomez in 2007

Personal information
- Born: Leonardo Carrera Gómez; July 9, 1961 (age 65) Tijuana, Baja California, Mexico
- Family: Bestia 666 (son)

Professional wrestling career
- Ring name(s): Caballero 2000; Ultraman 2000/Ultraman II; Amigo Ultra; Damien/Damián; Damián 666; Galaxy
- Billed height: 1.75 m (5 ft 9 in)
- Billed weight: 101 kg (223 lb)
- Billed from: Mexico City, Mexico
- Trained by: Luis Canales; Diablo Velasco; Rey Misterio
- Debut: 1982

Leonardo Carrera Gómez (born July 9, 1961) is a Mexican professional wrestler best known under the name Damián 666. He is signed to Lucha Libre AAA Worldwide (AAA).

He has worked for World Championship Wrestling (WCW), Frontier Martial-Arts Wrestling (FMW), Consejo Mundial de Lucha Libre (CMLL), Asistencia Asesoría y Administración (AAA), World Wrestling Association (WWA) and various promotions on the Mexican independent circuit, including Perros del Mal Producciones (PdM). Carrera also worked under the ring name Galaxy in WCW, a masked Luchador. Carrera often teams with Halloween, leading to the formation of the team "Mexico's Most Wanted", which has worked extensively in North America for such promotions as Xtreme Pro Wrestling (XPW) and Revolution Pro Wrestling (RPW). Carrera's son currently wrestles on the international independent circuit as Bestia 666.

== Professional wrestling career ==
=== Early career (1985–1991) ===
Carrera made his debut in 1985 after being trained by Luis Canales, he would later receive additional training by Rey Misterio. Carrera's first ring persona was a masked persona called "Caballero 2000" (Spanish for "Knight 2000"). After working as Caballero 2000 for a couple of years, Carrera's ring persona was recast in the fall of 1987. He became Ultraman II, patterned after the Japanese Tokusatsu TV show Ultraman, and worked as a successor for the now unmasked Ultraman (Milo Ventura). "Lucha Libre" Magazine renamed him Ultraman 2000 in 1988. Carrera began working for the Mexican wrestling promotion World Wrestling Association (WWA), where he teamed up with Aguila del América and Kiss to win the WWA World Trios Championship from Bill Anderson, Louie Spicolli and Tim Paterson (masked as Los Mercenarios Americanos) on December 12, 1991; this was Carrera's first title victory.

=== Frontier Martial-Arts Wrestling (1991–1996) ===
During 1991 Carrera began working in Japan for Frontier Martial-Arts Wrestling (FMW) where he was billed as "Amigo Ultra", to avoid any legal problems over the "Ultraman" trademark. While working in FMW Carrera's wrestling style was influenced by the Hardcore style of wrestling that FMW promoted. Atsushi Onita gave Garrera a new character: Demian, inspired by the movie The Omen. On July 16, 1993, Demian debuted in the Korakuen Hall. He and Zombi beat Battle Ranger and Eiji Ezaki. His ring persona was diabolical, so he wore facepaint and dark clothes instead of the mask and bright colors of Amigo Ultra. On December 7, 1993, Demian begins a society with The Sheik and Sabu wrestling against Onita, Sambo Asako and Mr. Gannosuke in Chiba's Choshishi Gym. Demian and Sabu participate in a Barbed Wire Tag Tournament in January, 1994. In March, 13, the trio was defeated by Mr. Pogo, Goro Tsurumi and Hideki Hosaka in the Heiwajima TV Theater in Tokyo. The Sheik blamed Demian for the losing and a feud started. The feud culminated on May 5, 1995, at the 6th Anniversary Show at the Kawasaki Stadium, where he wrestled two matches. In the first match, Carrera competed as Amigo Ultra and teamed with Ultra Taro to defeat Battle Ranger Z and Mach Hayato and then he competed as Damian against Sheik, in a match which he lost. Later on his name was modified to "Damián 666", with the addition of 666 stemming from the fact that he had taken to painting those numbers on his forehead. Damién 666's ring persona earned him the nickname La Bestia del Apocalipsis (Spanish for "The Beast of the Apocalypse"). By 1995 Carrera returned to North America working as Ultraman 2000 on some shows in Mexico and as Damién 666 in the US and some shows in Mexico. He teamed up with Aguila de American and Kiss once again to capture the WWA World Trios Championship. He also captured the WWA Middleweight Championship, working as Ultraman 2000 and also won the Mexican National Welterweight Championship from Psicosis in a "title vs. title" match on an Asistencia Asesoría y Administración (AAA) show. On March 16, 1996, Carrera lost the Ultraman 2000 gimmick in a Luchas de Apuestas mask vs. mask match against Psicosis. After being unmasked, Carrera abandoned the Ultraman 2000 ring persona completely and started working exclusively as Damién 666. This change meant that he had to vacate the Mexican Welterweight title.

=== Extreme Championship Wrestling (1996) ===
Carrera had a short stint in the United States with the Philadelphia, Pennsylvania-based promotion Extreme Championship Wrestling in mid-1996. At Massacre on Queens Boulevard in April 1996 he unsuccessfully challenged ECW World Heavyweight Champion Raven. The following month, at A Matter of Respect, he faced El Puerto Riqueño, with the bout ending in a no contest after Sabu attacked both men.

=== World Championship Wrestling (1996–1999) ===
In the fall of 1996 Carrera was one of the many Mexican Luchadors brought in to work for World Championship Wrestling (WCW) to bolster their Cruiserweight division. Carrera worked both as "Damian", his regular ring persona and as "Galaxy", a masked "Space Cadet" type of character, without any public acknowledgement that it was the same man working as both characters. He was a part of the 60 man Battle Royal at the World War 3 1996, 1997 and 1998. Beyond the three appearances, Carrera worked mainly as a low-card wrestler without much in-ring success. When Eddie Guerrero formed the Latino World Order (lWo) Carrera was one of the Luchadors that joined, but never made much headway in the group.

=== Various Mexican Promotions (2000–present) ===
==== Mexico's Most Wanted (2000–2005) ====
During Carrera's stint in WCW he began teaming with Halloween (who also worked as "Ciclope"), something which they decided to continue to do after both wrestlers left WCW. The two of them began working for South Californian promotions such as Revolution Pro and Xtreme Pro Wrestling (XPW) under the moniker "Mexico's Most Wanted". In 2000 and 2001 Damián 666 and Halloween toured with All Japan Pro Wrestling, working tag team and some times six man tag team matches with other Luchadors. On July 20, 2002, Mexico's Most Wanted defeated the teams of American Wild Child and Shady, Juantastico and Pogo The Clown and the New Panthers (K-Malik Shabazz and Raphael Muhammed) to become the first ever XPW World Tag Team Champions. On December 21, 2002, they lost the title to Youthanazia (Josh Prohibition and M-Dogg 20), but regained then just a month later. A week after winning the titles for the second time Mexico's Most Wanted lost them back to Youthanasia before leaving XPW. Later in 2003 Mexico's Most Wanted defeated The Aerial Express (Quicksilver and Scorpio Sky) to win the vacant Revolution Pro Tag Team championship, which they held for nine months.

In 2002 Damián 666 and Halloween began working for Consejo Mundial de Lucha Libre (CMLL), Mexico's largest and the world's oldest wrestling promotion. They were joined by Nicho el Millonario to form a group called La Familia de Tijuana, playing off the fact that all three wrestlers got their start in Tijuana and knew each other from back then. La Familia banded together to defeat Los Nuevos Infernales, the team of El Satánico, Averno and Mephisto, to win the Mexican National Trios Championship on September 27, 2002. La Familia defended the title well into 2003 until Nicho left the company in June 2003. By the end of June the team was stripped of the championship, as they could not defend the title.

==== Perros del Mal (2005–2012) ====
After Nicho left CMLL the "La Famila" group was disbanded and instead Damián 666 and Halloween was made part of a new super group that was forming, Los Perros del Mal, led by Perro Aguayo, Jr. In December 2005, Halloween injured his neck and knee, forcing him out of the ring while he recovered. During Halloween's injury Damián 666 began teaming regularly with fellow Perros del Mal member Mr. Águila. When Halloween returned the trio of Damián 666, Halloween and Mr. Águila defeated Máximo, El Sagrado and El Texano, Jr. for the Mexican National Trios Championship. The trio lost the championship to El Sagrado, La Sombra and Volador Jr. in August 2007 after which Halloween left CMLL. Damián 666 remained in CMLL and remained with Los Perros del Mal ending the 8-year run as Mexico's Most Wanted. In June 2008, Damián 666 was backstage at the World Wrestling Entertainment PPV One Night Stand and worked a tryout match later on. It was reported that the WWE considered offering Damián 666 a contract but nothing came of it.

In November 2008, Perro Aguayo, Jr. left CMLL over creative differences. Damián 666 and Mr. Águila followed Aguayo out of CMLL and helped launch their own promotion, Perros del Mal Producciones. Besides working in Producciones Perros del Mal as the matchmaker, Damián 666 has also worked for Alianza Universal De Lucha Libre (AULL) and International Wrestling Revolution Group (IWRG). In 2009 Halloween joined the Perros del Mal promotion, reuniting with Damián 666. In June 2010, Damián 666 became a major part of a storyline, where Los Perros del Mal invaded AAA. On August 14, 2010, at Verano de Escandalo, in the first major match between Los Perros del Mal and AAA, El Hijo del Perro Aguayo, Damián 666 and L.A. Park defeated El Mesías, Cibernético and La Parka in a six-man tag team match. On June 18, 2011, at Triplemanía XIX, Halloween, Damián 666 and X-Fly defeated Los Psycho Circus in a tournament final to become the first ever AAA World Trios Champions. On July 31 at Verano de Escándalo, Los Perros del Mal faced Los Psycho Circus in a steel cage match, where the last person left in the cage would lose either his hair or mask. The match ended with Psycho Clown escaping the cage, leaving X-Fly inside and forcing him to have his hair shaved off. After a Perros del Mal Producciones event on August 20, Carrera announced his retirement from professional wrestling as soon as he had fulfilled the rest of his commitments for AAA and various independent promotions. On August 28, Damián 666, his son Bestia 666 and X-Fly defeated Los Psycho Circus, Los Temerarios (Black Terry, Durok and Machin) and Los Villanos (Kortiz, Ray Mendoza, Jr. and Villano IV) in a steel cage match to win the IWRG Intercontinental Trios Championship during IWRG's La Jaula de la Muerte ("The Cage of Death") show. On October 9 at Héroes Inmortales, Los Perros del Mal and Los Psycho Circus ended their year-long rivalry, when Damián 666, Halloween and Nicho el Millonario were defeated in a Masks vs. Hairs steel cage match and were all shaved bald. After a five-month break from the rivalry, Los Perros del Mal lost the AAA World Trios Championship to Los Psycho Circus on March 11, 2012. The following day, Damián 666, Halloween and X-Fly announced that they had quit Los Perros del Mal.

==== La Familia de Tijuana (2012–present) ====
On March 13, 2012, Damián 666, Bestia 666, Halloween, Super Nova and X-Fly announced that they were forming La Familia de Tijuana, a group of independent wrestlers, much like Los Perros del Mal, with the exception that they were not looking to form their own promotion. It was also revealed that originally only Damián and his son were looking to get out of Los Perros del Mal, but the others joined them after learning of their intentions. On March 29, IWRG was officially announced as La Familia de Tijuana's new home promotion. On April 19, Damián 666's longtime partner Halloween severed his ties with La Familia de Tijuana and returned to Los Perros del Mal.

=== Return to Lucha Libre AAA Worldwide (2026–present) ===
Damián 666 returned to AAA at Week 1 of Verano de Escándalo on July 25, 2026, in a backstage segment with El Grande Americano.

== Championships and accomplishments ==
- Asistencia Asesoría y Administración
  - AAA World Trios Championship (1 time) – with Halloween and X-Fly
  - Mexican National Welterweight Championship (1 time)
- Cauliflower Alley Club
  - Lucha Libre Award (2023)
- Consejo Mundial de Lucha Libre
  - Mexican National Trios Championship (2 times) – with Halloween and Nicho el Millonario (1), Halloween and Mr. Águila (1)
- Federacion Internacional de Lucha Libre
  - FILL Tag Team Championship (1 time) – with Halloween
- International Wrestling All Stars
  - IWAS World Light Heavyweight Championship (2 times)
- International Wrestling Revolution Group
  - IWRG Intercontinental Trios Championship (2 times) – with Bestia 666 and X-Fly (1), and Headhunter I and X-Fly (1)
  - Copa Higher Power (2011) – with El Hijo de Lizmark
- North American Wrestling Association
  - NAWA Middleweight Championship (1 time)
- Nueva Generacion Xtrema
  - NGX World Tag Team Championship (1 time) – with Halloween
- Pro Wrestling Illustrated
  - PWI ranked him #93 of the top 500 wrestlers in the PWI 500 in 2006
- Revolution Pro
  - Revolution Pro World Tag Team Championship (1 time) – with Halloween
- World Wrestling Association
  - WWA Middleweight Championship (1 time)
  - WWA Tag Team Championship (1 time, final) – with Bestia 666
  - WWA World Trios Championship (2 times) – with Aguila de Americano and Kiss
- Canna Pro Wrestling
  - Canna Pro Championship (1 time)
- World Wrestling Organization
  - WWO Tag Team Championship (1 time) – with Halloween
- Xtreme Latin American Wrestling
  - XLAW Tag Team Championship (3 times) – with Halloween (2), Estrella Dorada Jr. (1)
- Xtreme Pro Wrestling
  - XPW World Tag Team Championship (2 times) – with Halloween

== Luchas de Apuestas record ==
Winner (wager)	Loser (wager)	Location	Event	Date	Notes
Ultraman 2000 (mask)	Canelo Casas (hair)	Tijuana, Baja California	Live event	February 3, 1989	
Amigo Ultra (mask)	Genghis Khan (mask)	Tokyo, Japan	Live event	May 24, 1992	
Damián 666 (hair)	Cholo García (hair)	Mexicali, Baja California	Live event	January 20, 1996	
Psicosis (mask)	Ultraman 2000 (mask)	Tijuana, Baja California	Live event	March 16, 1996	
Damián 666 (hair)	Mario Prado (hair)	Tijuana, Baja California	Live event	Unknown	
Damián 666 (hair)	Llmarada (hair)	Nuevo Laredo, Tamaulipas	Live event	Unknown	
Damián 666 (hair)	Pimpinela Escarlata (hair)	Nuevo Laredo, Tamaulipas	Live event	August 7, 2000	
Damián 666 (hair)	Super Caló (hair)	Nuevo Laredo, Tamaulipas	Live event	November 13, 2000	(Note: Super Caló wagered his hair, despite being masked at this time.)
Damián 666 (hair)	Halloween (hair)	Tijuana, Baja California	Live event	June 29, 2001	
Damián 666 (hair)	Fugaz (hair)	Nuevo Laredo, Tamaulipas	Live event	July 30, 2001	
Damián 666 (hair)	Zumbido (hair)	Tijuana, Baja California	Live event	September 29, 2001	(Note: Last two men in a multi-man steel cage match where Damián 666 was the last to leave.)
La Parka (mask)	Damián 666 (hair)	Tijuana, Baja California	Live event	December 21, 2001	
Damián 666 (hair)	Arandú (hair)	Monterrey, Nuevo León	Live event	September 29, 2002	
El Satánico (hair)	Damián 666 (hair)	Mexico City	Live event	October 25, 2002	
Damián 666 (hair)	El Tácua (hair)	Monterrey, Nuevo León	Live event	March 30, 2003	
Damián 666 (hair)	El Satánico (hair)	Tijuana, Baja California	Live event	October 15, 2004	
Damián 666 (hair)	X-Fly (hair)	Tijuana, Baja California	Live event	October 22, 2004	
Damián 666 (hair)	Máscara Mágica (hair)	Mexico City	Live event	June 16, 2005	
Rey Bucanero and Tarzan Boy (hair)	Damián 666 and Mr. Águila (hair)	Mexico City	50. Aniversario de Arena México	April 28, 2006	
Los Psycho Circus (masks) (Monster Clown, Murder Clown and Psycho Clown)	Los Perros del Mal (hair) (Halloween, Damián 666 and X-Fly)	Guadalajara, Jalisco	Verano de Escándalo	July 31, 2011	. (Note: This was a six-man tag team steel cage match. As a result of the match, only X-Fly had to cut his hair.)
Damián 666 (hair)	Monster Clown (championship)	Naucalpan, State of Mexico	Live event	August 28, 2011	(Note: Four team steel cage match, where Los Psycho Circus (Monster Clown, Murder Clown and Psycho Clown) put their IWRG Intercontinental Trios Championship on the line against the hairs/masks of Los Perros del Mal (Damián 666, Bestia 666 and X-Fly), Los Temerarios (Black Terry, Durok and Machin) and Los Villanos (Kortiz, Ray Mendoza, Jr. and Villano IV).)
Los Psycho Circus (masks) (Monster Clown, Murder Clown and Psycho Clown)	Los Perros del Mal (hair) (Halloween, Damián 666 and Nicho el Millonario)	Monterrey, Nuevo León	Héroes Inmortales	October 9, 2011	. (Note: This was a six-man tag team steel cage match.)
Chavo Guerrero Jr. (hair)	Damián 666 (hair)	Santa Maria, California	Summer Sizzle V - VendettaVersary	August 2, 2014	(Note: Chavo Guerrero Jr. wagered Chavo Guerrero Sr.'s hair and Damián 666 wagered Bestia 666's hair; however, Bestia 666 left the arena before the Guerreros could cut his hair.)
