= Luke Hawx =

American professional wrestler, actor, and stuntman

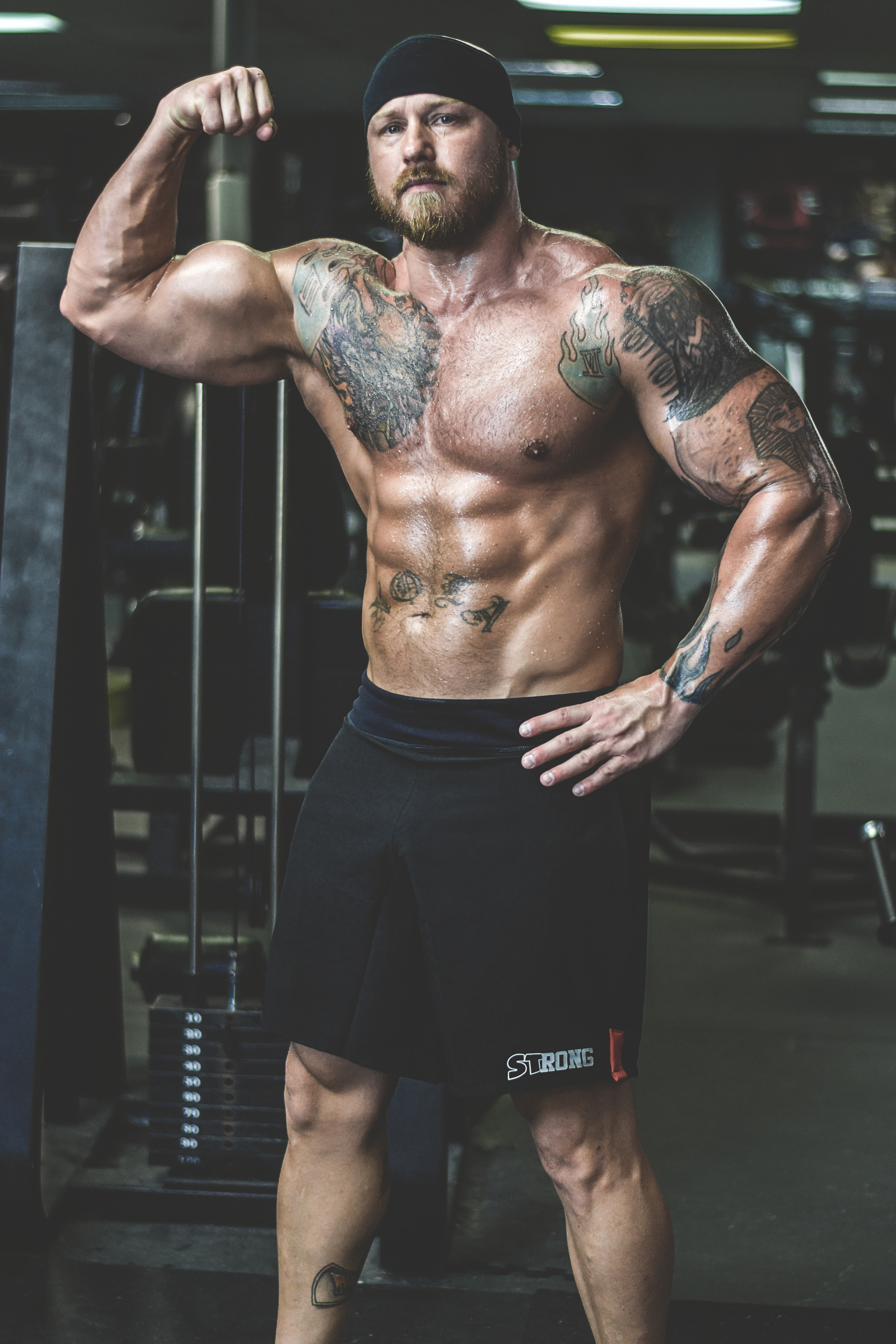
- Luke Hawx in 2019

Personal information
- Born: Oren Hawxhurst; July 8, 1981 (age 45) New Orleans, Louisiana, U.S.

Professional wrestling career
- Ring name(s): Altar Boy Luke; Luke Hawx; The New Orleans Bad Boy; Perry Douglas; Perry Wallace
- Billed height: 6 ft 0 in (1.83 m)
- Billed weight: 227 lb (103 kg; 16.2 st)
- Billed from: St. Michael's Cathedral; New Orleans, Louisiana
- Trained by: Vic Grimes
- Debut: 1999

Oren Hawxhurst (born July 8, 1981) is an American professional wrestler, professional wrestling promoter, actor, and stuntman. He is best known under the ring name Luke Hawx and is also known for his time in Xtreme Pro Wrestling under the ring name Altar Boy Luke, along with being the founder and current CEO of Wildkat Sports. He has appeared in box office hits like Logan and The Fate of the Furious. He also works as a consultant on Starz television series Heels.

== Professional wrestling career ==
=== Xtreme Pro Wrestling (1999–2009) ===
After regularly attending independent wrestling shows during his teenage years, he met "Vicious Vic" Grimes. After keeping in contact with him, Hawxhurst eventually received full training from Grimes. In 1999, Hawxhurst made his pro wrestling debut in Pensacola, Florida as Perry Douglas against Lightning Kid Jerry Riner. Soon afterwards, he toured the United States independent circuit before being signed to a contract by Xtreme Pro Wrestling. Upon his XPW debut, Hawxhurst, under the ring name Altar Boy Luke, was placed in a tag team with Altar Boy Matthew to form The Altar Boys. To further emphasize their characters, both Luke and Matthew shaved their heads and wore white preaching robes.

After Matthew left XPW due to family issues, Luke began competing as a singles wrestler, and participated in the final King of the Deathmatch Tournament to determine the new King of the Deathmatch Champion. He won his first round match by beating Vinnie Massaro, but lost to Supreme in the second round. Despite losing the tournament, Luke faced Supreme in a Bed of Light Tubes and Barbed Wire match at the Fallout event on October 5 and defeated him to win the King of the Deathmatch Title. On December 21 at the Merry F'n X-Mas event, Luke lost the title to Supreme in a House of Horrors Match.

On May 24, 2008, at XPW's reunion event, Cold Day In Hell, Hawx defeated Jack Evans and Scorpio Sky in a three-way match. On August 22, 2009, at XPW's 10 Year Anniversary show, Hawx and Sky defeated Matt Cross and Tool in a tag team match.

=== Independent circuit (2003–present) ===
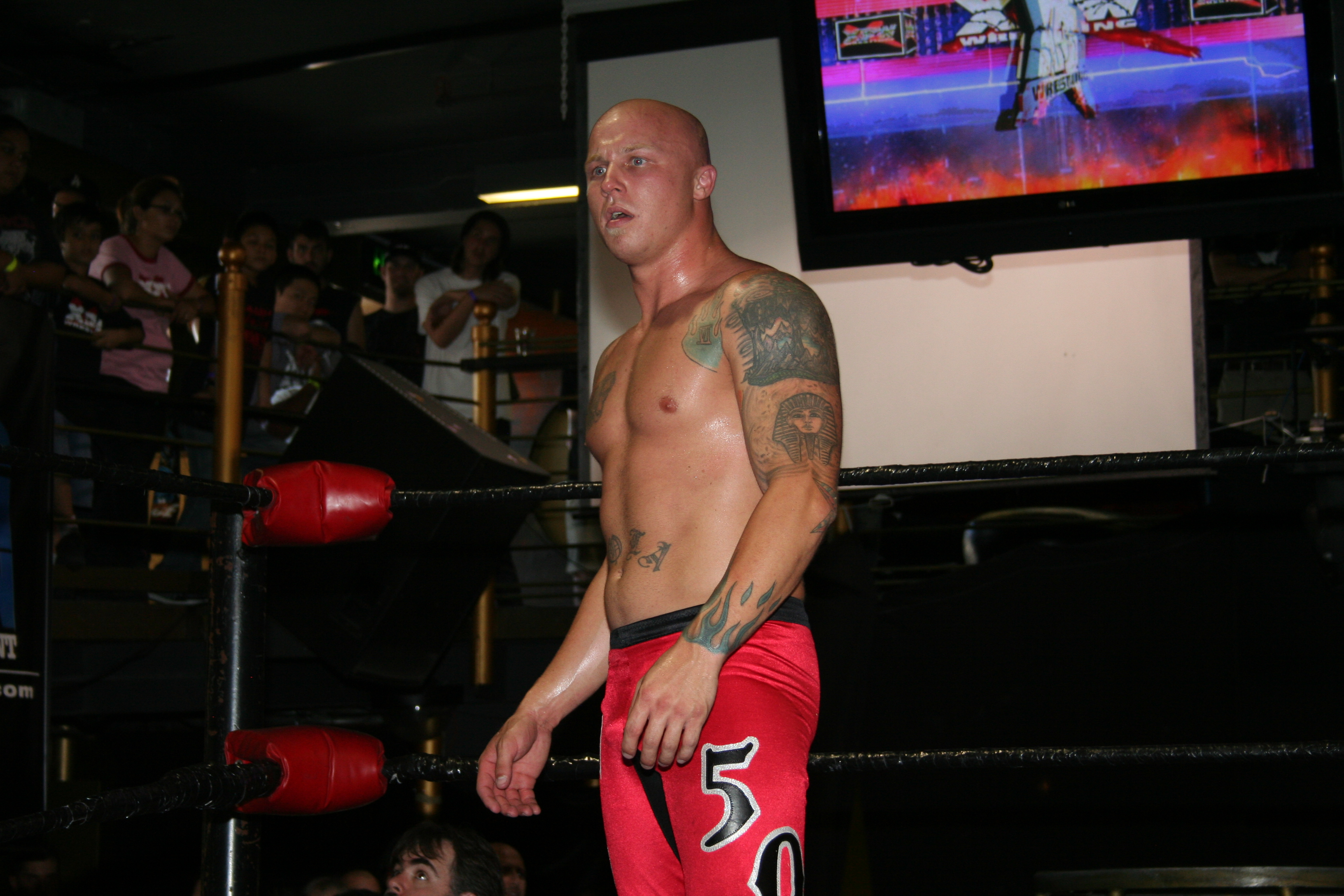
Hawx at XPW's 10 Year Anniversary in August 2009

When XPW folded in early 2003, Hawxhurst changed his ring name to Luke Hawx and also adopted a more traditional ring attire before resuming work on the independent circuit for various promotions, including Total Nonstop Action Wrestling, Ring of Honor, Combat Zone Wrestling, and NWA Wildside.

On the November 11, 2006 taping of MTV's Wrestling Society X, Hawx debuted for the show in a losing effort to Human Tornado. At the taping the next day, Hawx teamed with Al Katrazz in a winning effort against Kaos and Aaron Aguilera in a Tables, Ladders and Chairs match. On the November 14 taping, Hawx and Katrazz won again after defeating Keep It Gangsta (Ruckus and Babi Slymm) before losing to The Trailer Park Boys (Nate Webb and Josh Raymond). On the February 13, 2007 episode of WSX, Hawx and Katrazz defeated Kaos and Aguilera in a TLC rematch. WSX folded shortly afterwards.

On August 4, 2012, in Orlando, Florida, Hawxhurst defeated Jesse Neal to win the Continental Wrestling Federation Championship.

Since his days in Extreme Rising, Hawx started a feud against Matt Hardy. On July 19, 2014, at Maryland Championship Wrestling's Shane Shamrock Cup, Hawx and Hardy wrestled in a TLC match for Hardys MCW Heavyweight Championship and Hawx Extreme Rising World Championship (which Hawx had the physical belt). However, Hardy won the match. After the match, Hardy gave back the belt to Hawx.

In 2016, Hawx was a 2-time World Heavyweight Champion in World Association of Wrestling, a British Wrestling organisation run by the family of WWE Women's wrestler Paige. He first won the title by defeating Zak Knight on May 14, only to lose it to Mr. Anderson on September 16. Hawk regained the title the very next night in a rematch, holding it for another 91 days before losing it to Brad Slayer.

=== Extreme Rising (2012–2014) ===
In early 2012, Shane Douglas announced the foundation of the Extreme Rising promotion, with its inaugural event, Extreme Reunion, to be held on April 28, 2012. At the event, Hawx made his debut for the promotion as a heel by venting his frustrations about Douglas and the reunion show itself before he was escorted from the building by security. He later returned to distract Stevie Richards in the event's opening match, which ultimately cost The Blue World Order their tag team match against The Full Blooded Italians. On June 29, Hawk was able to defeat Richards in an "Extreme Respect" match following assistance from Sylvester Terkay. The following night, Richards defeated Hawx in a rematch, but was attacked by Hawx after the match. Hawx took the mic and once again called out Douglas before being forced to the back security. Hawx then competed at Extreme Rising's first iPPV event Remember November, entering the Extreme Rising World Championship Tournament. He defeating Perry Saturn by submission in the first round and later interfered in the main event, where he legitimately injured Matt Hardy during Hardy's match against Shane Douglas. On March 1, 2014, Hawx defeated Extreme Rising World Champion Stevie Richards in a non-title match at an ECWA event, following interference from "The Greek God" Papadon. Afterwards, Hawx took possession of the title belt and declared himself the new champion, leading to Extreme Rising demanding him to return the belt, while announcing that he had earned himself a championship match on April 26. However, Hawx didn't give back the belt.

=== World Wrestling Entertainment (2003; 2007–2010) ===
On the September 1, 2003, Hawxhurst, reusing his Altar Boy Luke gimmick, made his World Wrestling Entertainment debut as he teamed with Mortis and defeated Big Bad Jon and Travis Tomko in a tag team dark match before the taping of SmackDown!.

On July 10, 2007, Hawxhurst received another WWE tryout match and lost to Chuck Palumbo at the SmackDown! taping in his hometown of New Orleans, Louisiana. On the March 21, 2008 episode of SmackDown, Hawx, along with Chase Stevens and Andy Douglas, faced and lost against The Big Show in a 3-on-1 handicap match. On the June 9, 2009 episode of ECW, Hawxhurst, as Luke Hawx, teamed with Kris Lewie in a losing effort to Vladimir Kozlov in a handicap match. On the February 9, 2010 episode of ECW, Hawxhurst, under the ring name Perry Wallace, lost to Ezekiel Jackson.

== Media ==
=== Filmography ===
- Castle Falls (2021) as Inmate #2
- Project Power (2020) as Bouncer
- Wounds (2019) as Marvin
- The Fate of the Furious (2017) as Miller
- Logan (2017) as Reaver
- Kickboxer: Vengeance (2015) as Fighter 3
- Happily Never After (2014) as Matt Hinrichsen
- Monsters and Mysteries in America (2014) as Cajun Werewolf
- The Mechanic (2010) stunts
- Brother's Keeper (2010) stunts
- Maskerade (2010) stunts
- Wrong Side of Town (2010) stunts
- The Dead Sleep Easy (2007) as Fighter 1

== WildKat Sports ==
In June 2011, Hawxhurst and fellow professional wrestler Orlando Jordan founded WildKat Sports & Entertainment, a professional wrestling school located in Hawxhurst's hometown of New Orleans, Louisiana. The school is also home to WILDKAT, which was formerly known as NWA WildKat during its 10-month-long stint as a National Wrestling Alliance territory. The promotion is home to many local independent wrestlers, including: Bu Ku Dao, Danny Flamingo, J Spade, Matt Lancie, Curt Matthews, Jared Wayne, Scott Phoenix, Jace Valor, Nate Bradley, Reginald Gates, Steve Anthony, Stevie Richards, and Hawx himself.

== Championships and accomplishments ==
- Continental Wrestling Federation
  - CWF Championship (1 time)
- Extreme Rising
  - Extreme Rising World Championship (1 time)^{1}
  - Extreme Breakout Star (2012)
- Maryland Championship Wrestling
  - Shane Shamrock Memorial Cup (2013)
- PowerSlam Productions
  - PSP Heavyweight Championship (1 time)
- Pro Wrestling Illustrated
  - PWI ranked him #139 of the top 500 wrestlers in the PWI 500 in 2014 and 2015
- Real Quality Wrestling
  - RQW World Heavyweight Championship (1 time, final)
- Reality of Wrestling
  - ROW Tag Team Championship (1 time) - with PJ Hawx
- Tier 1 Wrestling
  - Tier 1 Championship (1 time)
- WILDKAT Pro Wrestling
  - WILDKAT Heavyweight Championship (1 time)
  - WILDKAT Tag Team Championship (1 time, current) - with PJ Hawx
  - WILDKAT Revolution Rumble (2019)
- World Association of Wrestling
  - WAW World Heavyweight Championship (2 times)
- Xtreme Pro Wrestling
  - XPW King of the Deathmatch Championship (1 time)
  - XPW World Tag Team Championship (1 time, final) – with Scorpio Sky

1 Hawx's reign was not recognized by Extreme Rising.
