= G. Q. Money =

American professional wrestler and manager

Personal information
- Born: Ryan Katz; October 14, 1976 (age 50) Buffalo Grove, Illinois, U.S.

Professional wrestling career
- Ring name(s): Devilish Lee Handsome; G. Q. Money; Fabian Kaelin; The Lemon; Minion; Rak Rixelplix; Ryan Katz; Stylez Monroe
- Billed height: 5 ft 5 in (165 cm)
- Billed weight: 147 lb (67 kg)
- Billed from: "Hollywood, California, by way of Aspen, Colorado"
- Trained by: Dan Magnus; Bobby Black
- Debut: 1999
- Retired: May 18, 2013

Ryan Katz (born October 14, 1976) is an American retired professional wrestler, promoter and manager signed to WWE as a producer. Katz is best known in Xtreme Pro Wrestling under the ring name G. Q. Money as the manager of Kaos of The Enterprise.

== Professional wrestling career ==
=== Training and independent circuit (1999–2013) ===
Katz was outcast by his family when he decided to start his own wrestling fight club in nearby Denver. His self-promotion and outlandish ideas landed him in a position of power in Xtreme Pro Wrestling, where he donned the persona of "G. Q. Money": a fast-talking agent to the stars who, because of his mouth, got caught up in many dangerous situations including being tossed off a car, tossed on guardrails, and tossed off a 30-foot tower.

Katz worked as the ring announcer and host for the short-lived Wrestling Society X under the name Fabian Kaelin, a reference to the concept of kayfabe.

Katz performed in a motion-capture suit for the World Wrestling Entertainment video game WWE SmackDown vs. Raw 2011, performing activities used to portray Rey Mysterio and Theodore Long. He also previously did motion capture work for WWE SmackDown vs. Raw 2007, and provided a voice in WWE SmackDown vs. Raw 2006.

=== Total Nonstop Action Wrestling (2003) ===
In 2003, Katz was briefly a part of a stable headed by Christopher Daniels in Total Nonstop Action Wrestling where he portrayed one of the followers under the name of Minion.

=== WWE (2012, 2015–present) ===
Katz appeared on WWE Raw on the August 27, 2012 episode under the name Stylez Monroe in the "anger management class" segment involving Kane and Daniel Bryan. In May 2015, Katz became a Creative Producer at the WWE Performance Center for the NXT brand and appeared as The Lemon, a member of Adam Rose's Exotic Express, and as the presenter on The Vaudevillains' Titantron. Katz was released by WWE on January 5, 2022, but was rehired on September 1.

== Other media ==
In 2001, he was a contestant on a short-lived revival of Card Sharks, and has also appeared on the game show 20Q.

In 2004, he was a contestant on the TBS reality show He's a Lady, where because of the show, he was a guest on The Oprah Winfrey Show.

Katz currently runs The Fit Pit Pro Wrestling School in Chatsworth, California, where he teaches a new crop of students the art of professional wrestling and sports entertainment. He also runs RakaMedia, a DVD production firm. Katz still records songs as a hip-hop MC, and recently opened up for hip-hop legend Kurtis Blow at a show in Denver, CO.
