= Xtreme Pro Wrestling =

American independent professional wrestling promotion

- Acronym: XPW
- Founded: 1999 (re-established in 2021)
- Defunct: 2003 (original promotion) 2023 (revival promotion)
- Style: Hardcore wrestling Sports entertainment
- Headquarters: Southern California; Philadelphia, Pennsylvania; Pittsburgh, Pennsylvania; Rochester, New York
- Founder: Rob Zicari
- Owner: Rob Zicari
- Parent: Extreme Associates (1999–2003); Xtreme Entertainment Group (2004–2008); Big Vision Entertainment (2008–2012); Extreme Gifts (2012–2025)
- Successor: Original promotion: Wrestling Society X MEXPW
- Website: thexpwwrestling.com

Xtreme Pro Wrestling (XPW) was an American independent professional wrestling promotion owned by Rob Zicari and operated by Extreme Gifts. The promotion is known for its deathmatch style. From 2000 to 2002, XPW held an annual deathmatch tournament called Baptized in Blood, also known as the King of the Deathmatch Tournament.

Zicari originally ran the promotion out of Los Angeles from 1999 to 2002. He appeared on shows as the on-camera owner under the ring name Rob Black alongside his then-wife Lizzy Borden. The promotion focused on hardcore wrestling and had connections to the Los Angeles porn industry, as Zicari was the real life owner of the Extreme Associates pornographic film production company.

In 2002, Shane Douglas, who previously wrestled for the promotion, returned to XPW as its booker and moved the "All-New XPW" to his home state of Pennsylvania. Credited to the promotional efforts of Douglas and Cody Michaels, XPW's East Coast move was initially successful in cities like Philadelphia and Pittsburgh before, ultimately, being deemed a failure and contributing to the promotion's closure in 2003. After the promotion became defunct, Big Vision Entertainment held two XPW reunion shows, Cold Day In Hell in May 2008 and XPW X in August 2009. Perros del Mal Producciones held a third XPW reunion show, Perros del Mal vs. XPW: Xtremo y Sangriento, in August 2011.

In 2021, after XPW was featured on Vice's Dark Side of the Ring series, Zicari relaunched the promotion, basing it out of Rochester, New York.

== History ==
=== Early years (1999–2002) ===
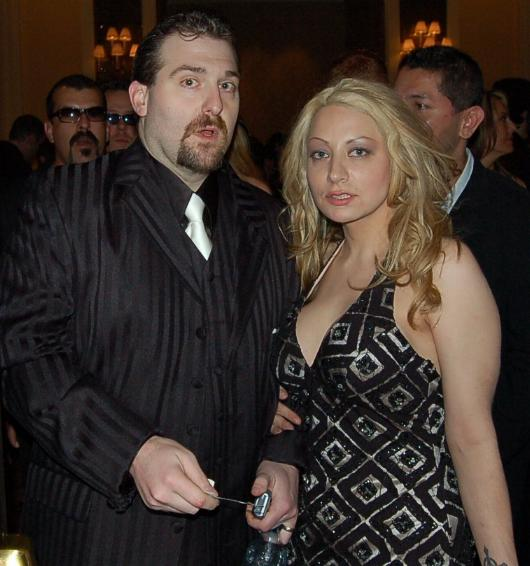
XPW founder Rob Black alongside XPW performer Lizzy Borden

Xtreme Pro Wrestling (XPW) was founded in summer 1999 on the West Coast, based primarily in Los Angeles, California. The promotion based its style on hardcore wrestling, featuring many dangerous matches. In addition, XPW kept a major focus on the soap opera aspect of wrestling, as the storylines involved porn stars, alternative lifestyles, profanity, and sadistic violence. The first XPW event was held on July 31, 1999 at the Reseda Country Club. The initial announce team for XPW consisted of Kris Kloss and Larry Rivera, with Kloss doing the play-by-play and Rivera taking on the role as a heel color commentator. Kloss's trademark was screaming expletives or shrieking a high pitched scream when something shocking occurred in a match. Rivera often sided with owner Rob Black, calling him the "Donald Trump of the pro wrestling business", and his trademark announcing consisted of referring to Kloss as "chico", using "chico" in nearly all of his sentences, and occasional wandering into Spanish announcing. In this period, the promotion's main stars were homegrown wrestlers, but many former stars of Extreme Championship Wrestling (ECW) passed through XPW following the fall of that promotion.

In July 2000, ECW made its West Coast debut, holding its annual summer pay-per-view Heat Wave in Los Angeles, California. Rob Black purchased six front row tickets and sent The Messiah, Kid Kaos, Supreme, Kristi Myst, Homeless Jimmy, and Kris Kloss to attend the show. Prior to the main event, the XPW crew began disrupting the show, which led to a legitimate out-of-character brawl between the XPW contingent and members of the ECW roster, which spilt out into the parking lot of the venue.

Shortly after the ECW incident, XPW had their first-anniversary event, Go Funk Yourself, at the Los Angeles Memorial Sports Arena on July 22, 2000. The main event saw XPW World Heavyweight Champion Sabu defeat Terry Funk. The event was considered by many as a high point for XPW; though it was four more months until XPW put on another event. During the hiatus, an attempt to bring in Atsushi Onita, a pioneer of Japanese deathmatch wrestling, for an exploding ring match failed.

One of the main storylines for most of 2001 concerned the heel stable known as the Black Army. The Black Army was headed by Rob Black, assisted by his wife Lizzy Borden and XPW's top star The Messiah, and feuded with Sabu. Also, throughout most of 2001, another heel stable called the Enterprise emerged and would eventually feud with the Black Army the following year. Originally consisting of former Black Army henchmen Steve Rizzono, motivational speaker TJ Rush, porn star Veronica Caine, and G. Q. Money, the stable became fully formed at the Damage Inc. event when Kid Kaos won the newly created XPW Television Championship and turned his back on his uncle Supreme, aligning himself with the Enterprise. After this surprise heel turn, Kid Kaos dropped the "Kid" from his name and nicknamed himself "The Rock Superstar" Kaos.

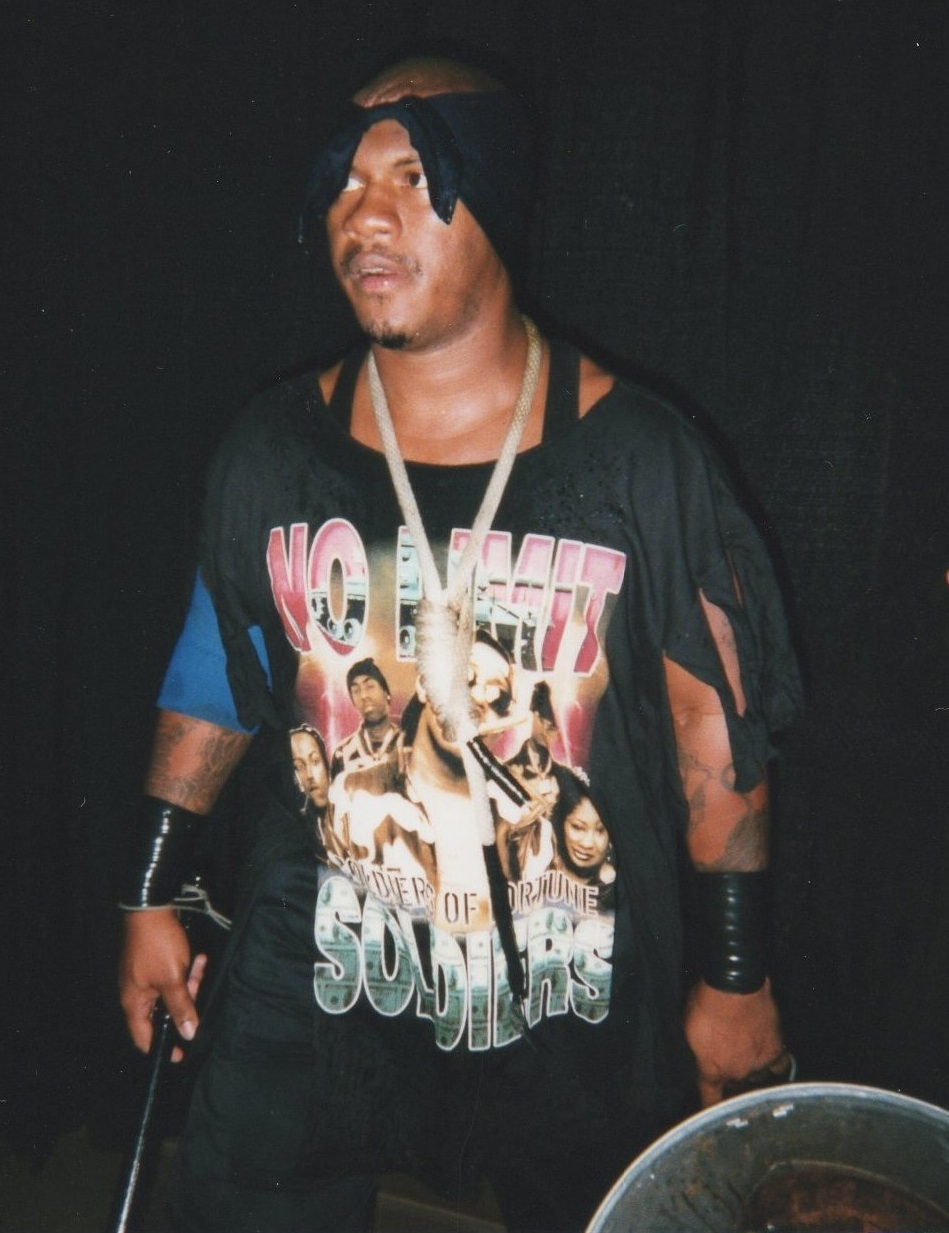
New Jack was amongst several former Extreme Championship Wrestling talents to perform in XPW

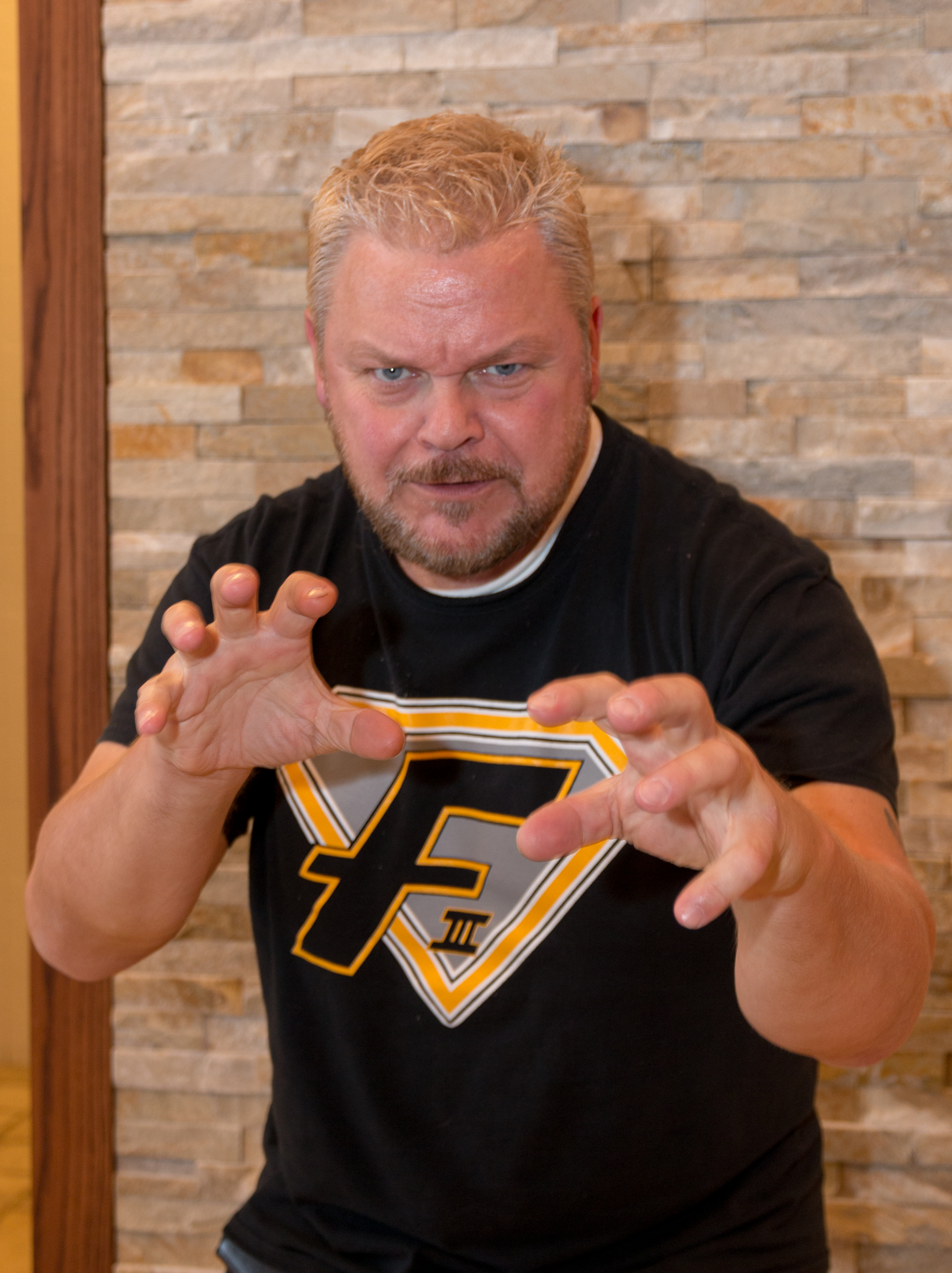
Shane Douglas would be an important figure in XPW in the 2000s, serving as both one of the company's top stars as well as its booker behind the scenes

For a year, from April 2001 to April 2002, XPW ran events at Los Angeles' Grand Olympic Auditorium. Notable events during this period, included Genocide, which featured a double-ringed WarGames-style cage match and Free Fall, which included the infamous 40-foot scaffold match between Vic Grimes and New Jack. Many marquee names debuted in XPW during these events, such as The Sandman, Vampiro, Konnan, the Insane Clown Posse, and Psicosis.

At XPW's third-anniversary event, Night of Champions in July 2002, Shane Douglas made his return to XPW as the mystery opponent of Johnny Webb, winning the XPW World title. The event also saw the XPW's third King of the Deathmatch Tournament, matches from which got released on home video as Baptized In Blood III. Douglas would work as both an in-ring performer and booker for the promotion; under Douglas' influence, the promotion would move its operations from the West Coast to the Philadelphia, Pennsylvania, basing itself at the former ECW Arena.

=== East Coast invasion and closure (2002–2003) ===
XPW debuted at the former ECW Arena on August 31, 2002, at the Hostile Takeover event, and Shane Douglas became the promotion's focal point for the rest of the year. Controversy arose when XPW signed an exclusive lease with the ECW Arena, preventing other independent promotions from holding events at the venue. As XPW continued to run on the East Coast, the risqué storylines were quickly phased out, and a majority of XPW's West Coast employees were not a part of the East Coast-based "All-New XPW." The relocation to the East Coast also resulted in more former ECW stars passing through XPW, whether it be on a regular basis or one-night appearances.

XPW would eventually return to their former home of Los Angeles for a few events in early 2003. On March 8, 2003, the promotion held an event in Pittsburgh, Pennsylvania, which had 1,500 people in attendance, mainly due to Pittsburgh being Shane Douglas's hometown. This would be XPW's very last event; there was an event scheduled for April 2003 but it was cancelled. Tickets for the April 2003 event were reported to be selling very poorly prior to the event, leading to the event being cancelled, though XPW announced they were canceling the event due to a large storm.

In April 2003, Rob Black and Lizzy Borden were indicted on obscenity charges due to pornographic material produced by XPW's parent company, Extreme Associates. Federal agents in Pittsburgh had purchased the offending material, which depicted scenes of rape, urination, and murder. The trial took a financial toll on Black and Borden, and the two could no longer financially subsidize XPW, with the promotion going out of business. Xtreme Entertainment Group (which would later split into two companies, XEG and Big Vision Entertainment), the company of which former XPW employee Kevin Kleinrock would later become Executive Vice President of, purchased the rights to use the XPW name under license in 2004, through bankruptcy proceedings. Black later stated "If I never got indicted I would have definitely kept the wrestling thing going."

In the summer of 2003, the only pay-per-view (PPV) of the original XPW, The Best of XPW, aired. The PPV featured a compilation of highlights from XPW's past events. In 2006, Big Vision Entertainment founded Wrestling Society X, the de facto successor to XPW.

=== Reunions (2008, 2009, 2011) ===
Between 2008 and 2011, three XPW reunion shows were held, two in Los Angeles and a third in Tultitlan, Mexico. The first was Cold Day in Hell, held on May 24, 2008. The event came about when Big Vision Entertainment, the owners of XPW, worked on MTV's Wrestling Society X which featured many XPW alumni. While working on the project, the company came up with the idea to hold an XPW reunion show. The event was produced by Kevin Kleinrock and Kris Kloss. Big Vision Entertainment released Cold Day in Hell on DVD and Blu-ray in January 2009, which included the entire event and its 45-minute pre-show.

A second reunion show, called Ten Year Anniversary Spectacular, was held on August 22, 2009. A third and final XPW reunion show, called Perros del Mal vs. XPW: Xtremo y Sangriento was held on August 20, 2011. The show was a co-promoted event with the Perros del Mal promotion in Tultitlan, Mexico. In the aftermath of Perros del Mal vs. XPW: Xtremo y Sangriento, a promotion called MEXPW, which billed itself as a successor to XPW, was founded by Damián 666 and former XPW producer Mike Hartsfield. MEXPW later changed its name to MEXPRO Wrestling (MPW), this was a result of legal action from Big Vision Entertainment.

=== Revival (2021–2025) ===
During the summer of 2021, Zicari announced on Instagram and Twitter his plans to relaunch XPW.

The first event of the revived XPW, Rebirth, streamed on FITE TV pay-per-view from the Main Street Armory in Rochester, New York on November 7, 2021. Eight wrestlers competed during the event in a traditional single-elimination tournament for the then-vacated XPW World Heavyweight Championship, which was won by Brian Cage.

XPW's Killifornia event took place at the Derby Room in Pomona, California on April 9, 2022. During the event, sixteen wrestlers competed in Baptized in Blood, XPW's signature deathmatch tournament, for the XPW King of the Deathmatch Championship. The tournament was won by Shlak. Beautiful Disaster took place on June 25 and featured an eight-woman tournament to determine the first holder of the XPW Women's Championship. In the tournament final, Taya Valkyrie defeated Kamille Brickhouse, Ludark Shaitan, and Sage Sin Supreme in a ladder match to win the title.

== TV series (2000–2003, 2021–2025) ==
From April 2000 until March 2003, XPW ran a locally televised TV show, simply known as XPW TV. The show originally aired on KDOC-TV in Los Angeles, California, but later switched to WBGN-TV in Philadelphia, Pennsylvania, when the promotion relocated to that city. Following the relocation to Philadelphia, XPW TV would be referred to as XPW Monday Nightmare, with the television series airing on Mondays instead of its original Saturday night timeslot.

In November 2002, Kris Kloss was removed from XPW TV's announcing booth and replaced with former ECW commentator Joey Styles. Styles, however, left the company in December 2002, only spending about one month in the promotion.

In 2009, the first three seasons of XPW TV were released on DVD by Big Vision Entertainment. XPW TV matches have also been extras on several other Big Vision wrestling DVDs, including the DVD releases of Forever Hardcore and Hardcore Homecoming.

The series was revived in 2021 with weekly episodes airing on FITE TV. Following the end of the XPW-FITE partnership in 2022, XPW TV moved to Stream XPW, XPW's own streaming service.

== Championships ==
=== Current champions ===
As of October 8, 2026

Championship	Current champion(s)	Date won	Days	Note(s)
XPW World Heavyweight Championship	Eric Ryan	April 13, 2024	908+	Defeated Shlak at Baptized In Blood IV
XPW King of the Deathmatch Championship	Homeless Jimmy	February 25, 2024	956+	Won the Gauntlet of Death match at Alive and Kicking to win the vacant championship
XPW FITE TV Championship (Note: Despite its name, the championship has not been sanctioned by TrillerTV powered by FITE since 2022, when XPW's partnership with FITE ended.)	Kat Martini	October 22, 2022	1,447+	Defeated Judge Joe Dred, Biggie Briggs, Bo Cooper, Human Tornado, and Willie Mack at Halloween In Hell 3 to win the inaugural championship
XPW Women's Championship	Mickie Knuckles	November 25, 2023	1,048+	Defeated Ludark Shaitan at Drive In Massacre

=== Retired championships ===
- XPW World Tag Team Championship (2002–2003, 2009)
- XPW Television Championship (2001–2003)
- XPW European Championship (2003–2005)
