= IWRG Guerra de Empresas =

International Wrestling Revolution Group event series

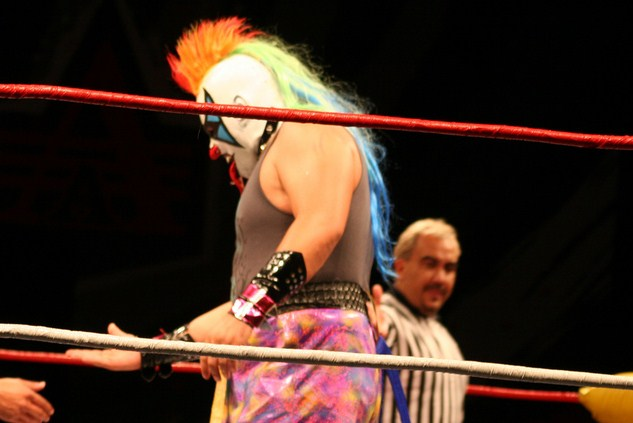
Psycho Clown, who along with Murder Clown won the second Guerra de Empresas tournament.

The title Guerra de Empresas (Spanish for "War of the Wrestling Promotions") is the name of a series of major lucha libre shows produced and scripted by the Mexico-based International Wrestling Revolution Group (IWRG; sometimes referred to as Grupo Internacional Revolución in Mexico) professional wrestling promotion. The Guerra de Empresas title has also been used by other Mexican wrestling promotions such as Consejo Mundial de Lucha Libre (CMLL) and various Mexican independent promotions. The Guerra de Empresas always features wrestlers from two or more promotions wrestling against each other in a tournament.

The first IWRG Guerra de Empresas show was held on October 2, 2010 and featured wrestlers from six different promotions competing in a tournament. IWRG held two Guerras de Empresas in 2011, the first in January and the second in April and a fourth Guerra de Empresas in 2012. IWRG has also participated in Guerras de Empresas produced by other promotions to represent IWRG.

== Event history ==
The first verified instance of the Mexican professional wrestling promotion International Wrestling Revolution Group (IWRG; at times referred to as Grupo Internacional Revolución in Mexico but uses the English name in their promotional material) held a major lucha libre show under the name Guerra de Empresas (which literally means "War of the Enterprises", in this case it specifically means"War of the wrestling promotions") was on October 2, 2010 as they held the 2010 Guerra de Empresas show. This, and all subsequent IWRG Guerra de Empresas shows featured an eponymous tournament where several wrestling promotions competed directly against each other. For the 2010 tournament Los Junior Dinamitas (El Hijo del Cien Caras and Máscara Año 2000, Jr.) represented IWRG. Earlier in the year IWRG had started to work closely with Asistencia Asesoria y Administracion (AAA), which sent two teams for the tournament; the duo of Dr. Wagner, Jr. and La Parka as well as the team known as Los Maniacos ("The Maniacs; Electroshock and Silver Cain). IWRG often used wrestlers from the Perros del Mal (PdM) promotion, which was represented by Bestia 666 and Damian 666. Hardcore wrestling promotion Desastre Total Ultraviolento (DTU) sent the team of Crazy Boy and Joe Líder to represent them and Alianza Universal de Lucha Libre (AULL) tag team champions Los Compadres (Chucho el Roto and Iron Love) rounded out the tournament. The first Guerra de Empresas tournament was won by Los Junior Dinamitas as they defeated Los Maniacos in the finals.

The second Guerra de Empresas tournament was held on January 2, 2011, and also doubled as the IWRG 15th Anniversary Show. For the second tournament IWRG was represented by Máscara Año 2000 Jr. and Trauma I, who normally did not team up. AAA sent two-thirds of their Los Psycho Circus trio as Murder Clown and Psycho Clown participated in the tournament. The Perros del Mal promotion was represented by X-Fly and Super Crazy, while Crazy Boy and Joe Líder once again represented DTU. AULL was also invited back for the tournament, sending Rocky Santana and Yakuza as their representatives. The last team did not officially represent Consejo Mundial de Lucha Libre (CMLL; Mexico's largest and the world's oldest wrestling promotion) as they no longer worked for CMLL, but Lizmark Jr. and El Hijo del Pierroth were billed as "Ex-CMLL". In the finals Los Psycho Circus defeated Los Perros del Mal to win the tournament.

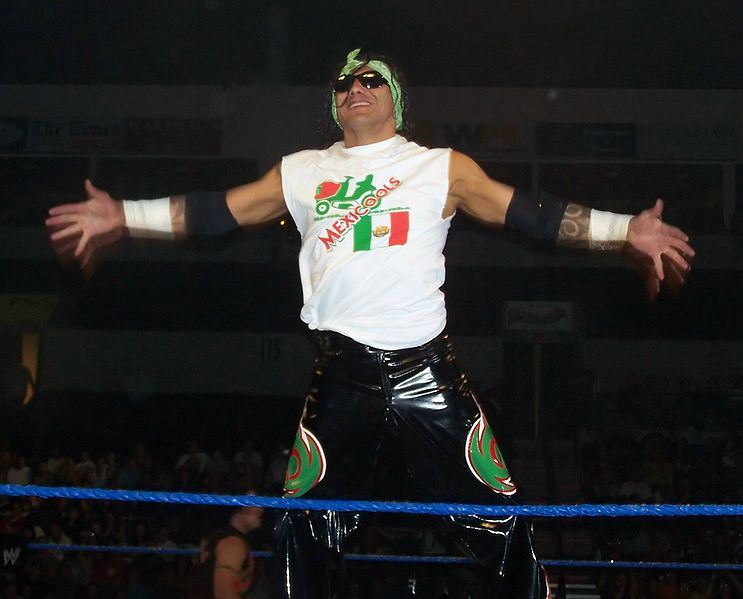
Nicho el Millonario, teamed up with Pimpinela Escarlata to win the third Guerra de Empresas tournament.

Four months later, on April 24, IWRG held a third Guerra de Empresas tournament. For this tournament three of the six teams represented IWRG, with no team from AULL for the first time. IWRG was represented by Black Terry and El Brazo, El Hijo del Dr. Wagner and Trauma I and finally the team of Máscara Año 2000 Jr. and El Veneno. AAA sent the team of Nicho el Millonario and Pimpinela Escarlata, El Hijo del Pirata Morgan and Lizmark Jr. represented Perros del Mal while Violento Jack and Paranoiko represented DTU. The tournament finals, where Nicho el Millonario and Pimpinela Escarlata defeated Máscara Año 2000 Jr. and Veneno, was not the main event of the show. Instead of the tournament headlining the third Guerra de Empresas show a multi-man steel cage match was the main event. In the main event Los Psycho Circus (Monster Clown, Murder Clown and Psycho Clown) defeated three other trios – Los Maniacos (Silver Cain, Joe Líder and Último Gladiador), Los Oficiales (Oficial 911, Oficial AK-47 and Oficial Fierro) and finally a Perros del Mal trio composed of Bestia 666, Damian 666 and X-Fly. As a result of their victory Los Psycho Circus won the IWRG Intercontinental Trios Championship.

The fourth, and as of 2016, last IWRG Guerra de Empresas tournament was held on July 8, 2012. For the first time the tournament had eight teams competing against each other. IWRG was represented by Los Junior Dinamitas (Cien Caras Jr. and El Hijo de Máscara Año 2000) and the team of Black Terry and Negro Navarro. Just like the previous three tournaments AAA sent teams to compete in the tournament, this time Cibernético and La Parka competed as well as La Maniarquia (Silver Cain and Último Gladiador) and thirdly El Consejo (Argos and El Texano Jr.) Perros del Mal were represented by Peter Powers and Psicosis, which Damian 666 and X-Fly represented La Familia de Tijuana after they broke away from Los Perros since the previous Guerra de Empresas tournament. DTU rounded out the field by sending Violento Jack and Aeroboy. The tournament was won by Cibernético and La Parka as they defeated Los Junior Dinamitas in the finals.

As of the 2012 Guerra de Empresas show a total of 70 wrestlers have worked at least one match out of the 33 matches held across the four shows, with an average of eight matches for each show. IWRG shows traditionally have five or six matches, but due to the Guerra de Empresas tournaments these shows had a higher average, with two shows hosting a total of nine matches in one night. Of those seventy wrestlers, six were female, invited specifically for the Guerra de Empresas shows as IWRG does not have a regular women's division. Four of the participants were Mini-Estrellas, a special division of short stature wrestlers, not necessarily wrestlers with dwarfism, who were also invited specifically for the shows as IWRG also does not regularly feature the Mini-Estrellas wrestlers. Violento Jack, representing Desastre Total Ultraviolento is the only wrestler to work all four IWRG Guerra de Empresas shows. Aeroboy (IWRG), Damián 666 (Perros del Mal), Joe Líder (DTU), Máscara Año 2000, Jr. (IWRG), La Parka (AAA), Psycho Clown (AAA), Sexy Lady (independent circuit), Silver King (AAA), Último Gladiador (AAA) and X-Fly (PDM) worked on three of the four shows.

== Tournament winners ==
Year	Winner	Representing	Loser	Representing	Ref(s)
2010	Los Junior Dinamitas (El Hijo del Cien Caras and Máscara Año 2000, Jr.)	IWRG	Los Maniacos (Electroshock and Silver Cain)	AAA	
2011 (January)	Los Psycho Circus (Murder Clown and Psycho Clown)	AAA	Los Perros del Mal (Super Crazy and X-Fly)	Perros del Mal	
2011 (April)	Nicho el Millonario and Pimpinela Escarlata	AAA	Máscara Año 2000 Jr. and Veneno	IWRG	
2012	Cibernético and La Parka	AAA	Los Junior Dinamitas. (Cien Caras Jr. and El Hijo de Máscara Año 2000)	IWRG	

== Dates, venues, and main events ==
Event	Date	City	Venue	Main event	Ref(s)
2010	October 3, 2010	Naucalpan, Mexico State	Arena Naucalpan	Los Junior Dinamitas (El Hijo del Cien Caras and Máscara Año 2000, Jr.) vs. Los Maniacos (Electroshock and Silver Cain)	
January 2011	January 2, 2011	Naucalpan, Mexico State	Arena Naucalpan	Los Psycho Circus (Murder Clown and Psycho Clown) vs. Los Perros del Mal (Super Crazy and X-Fly)	
April 2011	April 24, 2011	Naucalpan, Mexico State	Arena Naucalpan	Los Psycho Circus (Monster Clown, Murder Clown and Psycho Clown) vs. Joe Líder and Los Maniacos (Silver Cain and Último Gladiador) vs. Los Oficiales (Oficial 911, Oficial AK-47 and Oficial Fierro), vs. Los Perros del Mal (Bestia 666, Damian 666 and X-Fly) in a steel cage match	
2012	July 8, 2012	Naucalpan, Mexico State	Arena Naucalpan	Cibernético and La Parka vs. Los Junior Dinamitas. (Cien Caras Jr. and El Hijo de Máscara Año 2000)	
