= Guerra de Empresas (April 2011) =

2011 International Wrestling Revolution Group event

- Official poster for the Guerra de Empresas show
- Promotion: International Wrestling Revolution Group
- Date: April 24, 2011
- City: Naucalpan, State of Mexico
- Venue: Arena Naucalpan

Event chronology
← Previous; Guerra Revolucionario	Next → Choque de Empresas

IWRG Guerra de Empresas chronology
← Previous; January 2011	Next → 2012

Guerra de Empresas (April 2011) (Spanish for "War of the Promotions") was an annual professional wrestling major event and tournament produced by Mexican professional wrestling promotion International Wrestling Revolution Group (IWRG), which took place on April 24, 2011 in Arena Naucalpan, Naucalpan, State of Mexico, Mexico. IWRG's Guerra de Empresas series of events all center on inter-promotional competition with tag teams representing IWRG as well as a number of other wrestling promotions represented by one or more tag teams. The April tournament was the third tournament held by IWRG and the second held in 2011 by IWRG.

== Production ==
=== Background ===
The Guerra de Empresas ("War of the Promotions") concept is a recurring tournament between representatives of various Mexican wrestling promotions hosted by different promotions over time, International Wrestling Revolution Group (IWRG; Sometimes referred to as Grupo Internacional Revolución in Spanish) hosted the first one in 2010 and has hosted one or more Guerra de Empresas each year since then, while also sending representatives to other promotions for their Guerra de Empresas shows. The Guerra de Empresas tournament was normally a single-elimination tag team tournament with eight teams fighting for the trophy. The IWRG Guerra de Empresas shows, as well as the majority of the IWRG shows in general, are held in "Arena Naucalpan", owned by the promoters of IWRG and their main arena. The January 2011 Guerra de Empresas show was the second IWRG promoted a show under that name.

=== Storylines ===
The event featured nine professional wrestling matches with different wrestlers involved in pre-existing scripted feuds, plots and storylines. Wrestlers were portrayed as either heels (referred to as rudos in Mexico, those that portray the "bad guys") or faces (técnicos in Mexico, the "good guy" characters) as they followed a series of tension-building events, which culminated in a wrestling match or series of matches. The Main Event was a 12-Man Steel Cage Match. The last two wrestlers who remained in the ring fought one on one in a Lucha de Apuestas Match ("Bet match"), wagering their mask on the outcome of the match. The event included wrestlers from International Wrestling Revolution Group (IWRG) as well as a number of Mexican freelance wrestlers. IWRG's Guerra de Empresas series of events all center on inter-promotional competition with tag teams representing IWRG as well as a number of other wrestling promotions represented by one or more tag teams.

Guerra de Empresas 2011 participants

Team	Represented
Black Terry and El Brazo	IWRG
El Hijo de Pirata Morgan and Lizmark, Jr.	Perros del Mal
El Hijo de Dr. Wagner and Trauma I	IWRG
Máscara Año 2000, Jr. and Veneno	IWRG
Nicho el Millonario and Pimpinela Escarlata	AAA
Paranoiko and Violento Jack	Desastre Total Ultraviolento

== Event ==
The event was originally slated to have Charly Manson team up with Cibernético in the sixth match of the night against Electroshock and La Parka but did not show up for the match. This forced IWRG to replace him with Halloween, turning the regular tag team match into a Parejas Increibles since Halloween was part of Los Perros del Mal, a rival of Cibernético. Halloween was originally slated to represent the Perros del Mal wrestling promotion in the Guerra de Empresas tournament, but was replaced by El Hijo de Pirata Morgan, an IWRG regular who did not work for Los Perros.

=== Results ===
No.	Results	Stipulations
1	Chiva Rayada I, Mini Charly Manson and Sexy Lady vs. Fresero, Jr., Ludark Shaitan and Mascarita Sagrada ended in a no contest	Intergender Best two-out-of-three falls six-person tag team match
2	Máscara Año 2000, Jr. and Veneno defeated Paranoiko and Violento Jack	2011 Guerra de Empresas tournament quarter finals, tag team match
3	El Hijo de Dr. Wagner and Trauma I vs. El Hijo de Pirata Morgan and Lizmark, Jr. ended in a double count out	2011 Guerra de Empresas tournament quarter finals, tag team match
4	Nicho el Millonario and Pimpinela Escarlata defeated Black Terry and El Brazo	2011 Guerra de Empresas tournament quarter finals, tag team match
5	Nicho el Millonario and Pimpinela Escarlata defeated Máscara Año 2000, Jr. and Veneno	2011 Guerra de Empresas tournament finals, tag team match
6	Electroshock and La Parka defeated Cibernético and Halloween – two falls to one	Best two-out-of-three falls Parejas Increibles match
7	Los Psycho Circus (Monster Clown, Murder Clown and Psycho Clown) defeated Joe Líder and Los Maniacos (Silver Cain and Último Gladiador) (C) in a match that also included Los Oficiales (Oficial 911, Oficial AK-47 and Oficial Fierro), and Los Perros del Mal (Bestia 666, Damian 666 and X-Fly)	Lucha de Apuestas, IWRG Intercontinental Trios Championship vs. Masks vs. Masks vs. Hair steel cage match

== Aftermath ==
It was later revealed that Charly Manson had missed the event as he and a friend were arrested after getting into a fight with two police officers on the day of the show. The fight resulted in one of the officers suffering a fractured skull, the other a broken nose and whiplash while Manson's friend was shot in the foot by a third officer. Manson (real name Jesús Pozos) was originally denied bail and was expected to be waiting for his trial in jail, facing a maximum sentence of 15 years in prison for charges of aggravated assault and attacking authority figures. On May 4, AAA announced that Pozos had been released on bail. Pozos' bail was revoked on June 30, after which he was arrested at a AAA taping and taken to a prison in Mexico City. On February 23, 2012, it was reported that Pozos had been sentenced to 15 years in prison for his role in the altercation with the two police officers.
