= Guerra de Empresas (2012) =

2012 International Wrestling Revolution Group event

- Official poster depicting (clockwise) Negro Navarro, Silver King, Cibernético, La Parka and Último Gladiador
- Promotion: International Wrestling Revolution Group
- Date: July 8, 2012
- City: Naucalpan, State of Mexico
- Venue: Arena Naucalpan

Event chronology
← Previous; Legado Final	Next → Festival de las Máscaras

IWRG Guerra de Empresas chronology
← Previous; April 2011	Next → —

Guerra de Empresas (2012) (Spanish for "War of the Promotions") was an annual professional wrestling major event produced by Mexican professional wrestling promotion International Wrestling Revolution Group (IWRG), which took place on July 8, 2012 in Arena Naucalpan, Naucalpan, State of Mexico, Mexico. The event focused on an eight-tag team tournament between representatives of IWRG, AAA, Desastre Total Ultraviolento (DTU), La Familia de Tijuana (FdT) and Los Perros del Mal (PdM) to underline the "War of the Promotions" concept. While wrestlers all represented their "home" promotion they had competed on IWRG events prior to this event, either through IWRG's working relationship with AAA or due to be in independent contractors and not signed exclusively with one specific wrestling promotion.

== Production ==
=== Background ===
The Guerra de Empresas ("War of the Promotions") concept is a recurring tournament between representatives of various Mexican wrestling promotions hosted by different promotions over time, International Wrestling Revolution Group (IWRG; Sometimes referred to as Grupo Internacional Revolución in Spanish) hosted the first one in 2010 and has hosted one or more Guerra de Empresas each year since then, while also sending representatives to other promotions for their Guerra de Empresas shows. The Guerra de Empresas tournament was normally a single-elimination tag team tournament with eight teams fighting for the trophy. The IWRG Guerra de Empresas shows, as well as the majority of the IWRG shows in general, are held in "Arena Naucalpan", owned by the promoters of IWRG and their main arena. The June 2011 Guerra de Empresas show was the fourth IWRG promoted a show under that name and the fifth time a Guerra de Empresas was held in Mexico.

=== Storylines ===
The event featured nine professional wrestling matches with different wrestlers involved in pre-existing scripted feuds, plots and storylines. Wrestlers were portrayed as either heels (referred to as rudos in Mexico, those that portray the "bad guys") or faces (técnicos in Mexico, the "good guy" characters) as they followed a series of tension-building events, which culminated in a wrestling match or series of matches. IWRG's Guerra de Empresas series of events all center on inter-promotional competition with tag teams representing IWRG as well as a number of other wrestling promotions represented by one or more tag teams. IWRG's Guerra de Empresas series of events all center around inter-promotional competition with tag teams representing IWRG as well as a number of other wrestling promotions represented by one or more tag teams.

The 2012 Guerra de Empresas heavily focused on the rivalry between IWRG and AAA, with whom they have had a working relationship for years. In storyline terms the team of Damian 666 and X-Fly represented La Familia de Tijuana, which is not a wrestling promotion but a group of wrestlers who work for a number of different promotions. The tournament also included a team from Desastre Total Ultraviolento (DTU) as well as the Los Perros del Mal (PdM) promotion that both have worked on IWRG shows in the past and have had IWRG wrestlers work on their shows as well.

Guerra de Empresas 2013 participants

Team	Represented
Aeroboy and Violento Jack	Desastre Total Ultraviolento
Black Terry and Negro Navarro	International Wrestling Revolution Group
Cibernético and La Parka	AAA
El Consejo (Argos and El Texano, Jr.)	AAA
La Familia de Tijuana (Damian 666 and X-Fly)	La Familia de Tijuana
Los Hermanos Dinamita, Jr. (Cien Caras, Jr. and Hijo de Máscara Año 2000)	International Wrestling Revolution Group
La Maniarquia (Silver Cain and Último Gladiador)	AAA
Los Perros del Mal (Peter Powers and Psicosis)	Perros del Mal

== Results ==
No.	Results	Stipulations
1	Chicano, La Chiva and Lily Fighter defeated Sexy Lady, The Mummy and Tiger Lee	Intergender Best two-out-of-three falls six-person tag team match
2	El Consejo (Argos and El Texano, Jr.) defeated Black Terry and Negro Navarro	2012 Guerra De Empresas tournament quarter finals, tag team match
3	Los Hermanos Dinamita, Jr. (Cien Caras, Jr. and Hijo de Máscara Año 2000) defeated La Familia de Tijuana (Damian 666 and X-Fly)	2012 Guerra De Empresas tournament quarter finals, tag team match
4	Los Maniacos (Silver Cain and Último Gladiador) defeated Aeroboy and Violento Jack	2012 Guerra De Empresas tournament quarter finals, tag team match
5	Cibernético and La Parka defeated Los Perros del Mal (Peter Powers and Psicosis)	2012 Guerra De Empresas tournament quarter finals, tag team match
6	Los Hermanos Dinamita, Jr. (Cien Caras, Jr. and Hijo de Máscara Año 2000) defeated El Consejo (Argos and El Texano, Jr.)	2012 Guerra De Empresas tournament semi-finals, tag team match
7	Cibernético and La Parka defeated La Maniarquia (Silver Cain and Último Gladiador)	2012 Guerra De Empresas tournament semi-finals, tag team match
8	Cibernético and La Parka defeated Los Hermanos Dinamita, Jr. (Cien Caras, Jr. and Hijo de Máscara Año 2000)	2012 Guerra De Empresas tournament finals, tag team match
