= Guerra de Empresas (2010) =

2010 International Wrestling Revolution Group event

- Official poster depicting a variety of wrestlers on the show
- Promotion: International Wrestling Revolution Group
- Date: October 2, 2010
- City: Naucalpan, State of Mexico
- Venue: Arena Naucalpan

Event chronology
| ← Previous; La Copa Bicentenario | Next → Choque de Empresas |

IWRG Guerra de Empresas chronology
| ← Previous; First | Next → January 2011 |

Guerra de Empresas (2010) (Spanish for "War of the Promotions") was the first annual professional wrestling major event produced by Mexican professional wrestling promotion International Wrestling Revolution Group (IWRG), which took place on October 2, 2010 in Arena Naucalpan, Naucalpan, State of Mexico, Mexico. IWRG's Guerra de Empresas series of events all center around inter-promotional competition with tag teams representing IWRG as well as a number of other wrestling promotions represented by one or more tag teams. While wrestlers all represented their "home" promotion most had competed on IWRG events prior to this event, either through IWRG's working relationship with AAA or due to be in independent contractors and not signed exclusively with one specific wrestling promotion. The show was held on the anniversary of IWRG, but not officially promoted as an anniversary show.

== Production ==
=== Background ===
The Guerra de Empresas ("War of the Promotions") concept is a recurring tournament between representatives of various Mexican wrestling promotions hosted by different promotions over time, International Wrestling Revolution Group (IWRG; Sometimes referred to as Grupo Internacional Revolución in Spanish) hosted the first one in 2010 and has hosted one or more Guerra de Empresas each year since then, while also sending representatives to other promotions for their Guerra de Empresas shows. The Guerra de Empresas tournament was normally a single-elimination tag team tournament with eight teams fighting for the trophy. The IWRG Guerra de Empresas shows, as well as the majority of the IWRG shows in general, are held in "Arena Naucalpan", owned by the promoters of IWRG and their main arena. The 2010 Guerra de Empresas show was the first IWRG promoted a show under that name.

=== Storylines ===
The event featured nine professional wrestling matches with different wrestlers involved in pre-existing scripted feuds, plots and storylines. Wrestlers were portrayed as either heels (referred to as rudos in Mexico, those that portray the "bad guys") or faces (técnicos in Mexico, the "good guy" characters) as they followed a series of tension-building events, which culminated in a wrestling match or series of matches. IWRG's Guerra de Empresas series of events all center on inter-promotional competition with tag teams representing IWRG as well as a number of other wrestling promotions represented by one or more tag teams.

Guerra de Empresas 2010 participants

| Team | Represented |
|---|---|
| Los Compadres (Chucho el Roto and Iron Love) | Alianza Universal de Lucha Libre |
| Crazy Boy and Joe Líder | Desastre Total Ultraviolento |
| Dr. Wagner, Jr. and La Parka | Asistencia Asesoria y Administracion |
| Los Junior Dinamitas (El Hijo del Cien Caras and Máscara Año 2000, Jr.) | International Wrestling Revolution Group |
| Los Maniacos (Electroshock and Silver Cain) | Asistencia Asesoria y Administracion |
| Los Perros del Mal (Bestia 666 and Damian 666) | Perros del Mal |

== Results ==
| No. | Results | Stipulations |
|---|---|---|
| 1 | Eterno and Último Gladiador defeated Aeroboy and Violento Jack, Daga and Tribal | Three-way elimination tag team match |
| 2 | Mini Abismo Negro and Sexy Star defeated Fabi Apache and Mascarita Divina | Intergender tag team match |
| 3 | Los Psycho Circus (Monster Clown, Murder Clown and Psycho Clown) defeated Pasion Crystal, Pimpinela Escarlata and Polvo de Estrellas | Best two-out-of-three falls six-person tag team match |
| 4 | Los Junior Dinamitas (El Hijo del Cien Caras and Máscara Año 2000, Jr.), Dr. Wagner, Jr. and La Parka defeated Crazy Boy and Joe Líder, Los Compadres (Chucho el Roto and Iron Love), Los Maniacos (Electroshock and Silver Cain) and Los Perros del Mal (Bestia 666 and Damian 666) | 2010 Guerra De Empresas battle royal |
| 5 | Crazy Boy and Joe Líder defeated Los Compadres (Chucho el Roto and Iron Love) | 2010 Guerra De Empresas tournament quarter finals, tag team match |
| 6 | Los Maniacos (Electroshock and Silver Cain) defeated Los Perros del Mal (Bestia 666 and Damian 666) | 2010 Guerra De Empresas tournament quarter finals, tag team match |
| 7 | Los Maniacos (Electroshock and Silver Cain) defeated Los Perros del Mal (Bestia 666 and Damian 666) | 2010 Guerra De Empresas tournament semi-finals, tag team match |
| 8 | Los Junior Dinamitas (El Hijo del Cien Caras and Máscara Año 2000, Jr.) defeated Dr. Wagner Jr. and La Parka | 2010 Guerra De Empresas tournament semi-finals, tag team match |
| 9 | Los Junior Dinamitas (El Hijo del Cien Caras and Máscara Año 2000, Jr.) defeated Los Maniacos (Electroshock and Silver Cain) | 2010 Guerra De Empresas tournament finals, tag team match |
