= Guerra de Empresas (January 2011) =

2011 International Wrestling Revolution Group event

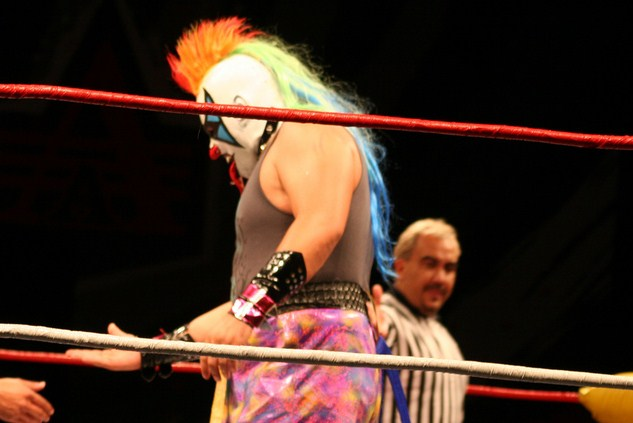
- Psycho Clown, who along with Murder Clown, won the tournament
- Promotion: International Wrestling Revolution Group
- Date: January 2, 2011
- City: Naucalpan, State of Mexico
- Venue: Arena Naucalpan

Event chronology
← Previous; Arena Naucalpan 33rd Anniversary Show	Next → Proyeccion a Nuevas Promesas

Guerra de Empresas chronology
← Previous; 2010	Next → April 2011

IWRG Anniversary Shows chronology
← Previous; 14th Anniversary	Next → 16th Anniversary

Guerra de Empresas (January 2011) (Spanish for "War of the Promotions") was an annual professional wrestling major event produced by Mexican professional wrestling promotion International Wrestling Revolution Group (IWRG), which took place on January 2, 2011 in Arena Naucalpan, Naucalpan, State of Mexico, Mexico. IWRG's Guerra de Empresas series of events all center around inter-promotional competition with tag teams representing IWRG as well as a number of other wrestling promotions represented by one or more tag teams. While wrestlers all represented their "home" promotion most had competed on IWRG events prior to this event, either through IWRG's working relationship with AAA or due to be in independent contractors and not signed exclusively with one specific wrestling promotion. The show was unofficially the 15th IWRG Anniversary Show, but not officially promoted as an anniversary show.

== Production ==
=== Background ===
The Guerra de Empresas ("War of the Promotions") concept is a recurring tournament between representatives of various Mexican wrestling promotions hosted by different promotions over time, International Wrestling Revolution Group (IWRG; Sometimes referred to as Grupo Internacional Revolución in Spanish) hosted the first one in 2010 and has hosted one or more Guerra de Empresas each year since then, while also sending representatives to other promotions for their Guerra de Empresas shows. The Guerra de Empresas tournament was normally a single-elimination tag team tournament with eight teams fighting for the trophy. The IWRG Guerra de Empresas shows, as well as the majority of the IWRG shows in general, are held in "Arena Naucalpan", owned by the promoters of IWRG and their main arena. The January 2011 Guerra de Empresas show was the second IWRG promoted a show under that name.

=== Storylines ===
The event featured nine professional wrestling matches with different wrestlers involved in pre-existing scripted feuds, plots and storylines. Wrestlers were portrayed as either heels (referred to as rudos in Mexico, those that portray the "bad guys") or faces (técnicos in Mexico, the "good guy" characters) as they followed a series of tension-building events, which culminated in a wrestling match or series of matches. IWRG's Guerra de Empresas series of events all center on inter-promotional competition with tag teams representing IWRG as well as a number of other wrestling promotions represented by one or more tag teams..

Guerra de Empresas 2011 participants

Team	Represented
Máscara Año 2000, Jr. and Trauma I	International Wrestling Revolution Group
Los Psycho Circus (Murder Clown and Psycho Clown)	Asistencia Asesoria y Administracion
Super Crazy and X-Fly	Los Perros del Mal
Crazy Boy and Joe Líder	Desastre Total Ultraviolento
Rocky Santana and Yakuza	Alianza Universal de Lucha Libre
El Hijo del Pierroth and Lizmark, Jr.	Ex-Consejo Mundial de Lucha Libre

== Results ==
No.	Results	Stipulations
1	Dinamic Black, Ludark Shaitan and Violento Jack defeated Aeroboy, Comando Negro and Sexy Lady	Intergender Best two-out-of-three falls six-person tag team match
2	Los Oficiales (Oficial 911, Oficial AK-47 and Oficial Fierro) (C) defeated Amadeus, Gran Apache and Taboo – two falls to one	Best two-out-of-three falls six-man tag team match for the IWRG Intercontinental Trios Championship
3	Los Psycho Circus (Murder Clown and Psycho Clown), Crazy Boy and Joe Líder defeated El Hijo del Pierroth and Lizmark, Jr., Los Perros del Mal (Super Crazy and X-Fly), Máscara Año 2000, Jr. and Trauma I, Rocky Santana and Yakuza	2011 Guerra De Empresas Battle Royal
4	Los Psycho Circus (Murder Clown and Psycho Clown) defeated Crazy Boy and Joe Líder	2011 Guerra De Empresas tournament semi-finals, tag team match
5	Máscara Año 2000, Jr. and Trauma I defeated Rocky Santana and Yakuza by disqualification	2011 Guerra De Empresas tournament quarter finals, tag team match
6	Los Perros del Mal (Super Crazy and X-Fly) defeated El Hijo del Pierroth and Lizmark, Jr.	2011 Guerra De Empresas tournament quarter finals, tag team match
7	Los Perros del Mal (Super Crazy and X-Fly) defeated Black Terry and Veneno (Note: Due to injuries suffered by Máscara Año 2000, Jr. and Trauma I in the first round IWRG veterans Black Terry and Veneno replaced them in the semi-finals.)	2011 Guerra De Empresas tournament semi-finals, tag team match
8	La Parka and Silver Cain defeated Dr. Wagner Jr. and Electroshock	Best two-out-of-three falls Parejas Increibles match
9	Los Psycho Circus (Murder Clown and Psycho Clown) defeated Los Perros del Mal (Super Crazy and X-Fly)	2011 Guerra De Empresas tournament finals, tag team match
