= Xtreme Latin American Wrestling =

Mexican professional wrestling promotion

- Acronym: X-LAW
- Founded: 2001
- Style: Professional wrestling Hardcore wrestling Lucha libre Shoot
- Headquarters: Mexico City
- Founder: Ernesto Ocampo
- Owner: Ernesto Ocampo

Xtreme Latin American Wrestling (XLAW or X-LAW) is a professional wrestling promotion based in Mexico, founded in 2001 by wrestling journalist Ernesto Ocampo. The promotion is credited to be the first Hardcore wrestling company in Mexico.

The promotion began in an attempt to show the Mexican fans the wrestling style that was practiced during the nineties in foreign promotions like FMW and ECW.

The promotion was founded in 2001 and closed in 2005. However, the promotion was restarted in 2009.

== History ==
=== X-LAW: Génesis ===
In 2000, Ocampo, who was then working for the magazine Luchas 2000, had a meeting with Antonio Peña, the owner of AAA, to show him a project to form a hardcore stable within the company, knowing that Paul Heyman had offered Peña the opportunity to acquire shares of ECW (which at that time was in financial troubles), which would have given the rights to create an "ECW Mexico" group in AAA.

Teaser posters for X-LAW first card.

Given the refusal of Peña, Ocampo and fellow journalist Manuel Flores began to work on creating their own promotion, raising money for months. In December 2000, both traveled to Tijuana to signing several professional wrestlers with experience in hardcore wrestling, like Damian 666, Halloween and Nicho el Millonario. The venue chosen to debut the new promotion was El Toreo de Cuatro Caminos, a bullring that for more than two decades host the shows of UWA.

Ocampo and Flores also signed ECW wrestlers Super Crazy, Nova and Yoshihiro Tajiri (who was about to start working for WWE), and former ECW stars Sabu and Juventud Guerrera. X-LAW also established ties with Último Dragón promotion Toryumon, booking for the show almost all his students at the time, who then integrated Toryumon 2000 Project (T2P). Another working relationship started with International Wrestling Association from Puerto Rico. IWA promoter Víctor Quiñones travel to Mexico with then IWA Heavyweight Champion Ricky Banderas and taped many segments for his IWA TV show. Two main events were announced: Hijo del Santo vs. Perro Aguayo, and Sabu vs. Damián 666 in a match for the XPW Heavyweight Championship. The card also featured the first ever ladder match in Mexico, with Rey Misterio, Sr. and Halloween vs. El Mosco and Depredador. The show was heavily promoted in Luchas 2000 magazine and in other publications like La Afición newspaper and the Tijuana based Frontera daily The show was held on March 4, 2001 gathering a crowd of 7000 people.

=== X-LAW: LAW AND disORDER ===
After Génesis, Ocampo and Flores planned a second show in El Toreo headlined by a mask vs. hair match between Hijo del Santo and Perro Aguayo, but the idea was scrapped due to the forced retirement of Aguayo after a similar match between him and Universo 2000 in the Arena Mexico.

VHS cover for X-LAW LAW AND disORDER tour in Tulancingo.

Instead of run Toreo again, a tour was prepared, which was originally called SIEGE, but was renamed LAW AND disORDER. The tour has four dates: Tulancingo, Aguascalientes, Tultitlán and Tlalnepantla. Originally, the entire roster of Genesis was contemplated, but was reduced, although they added two wrestlers from the Philadelphia-based promotion Combat Zone Wrestling: John Zandig and Wifebeater. During this tour the company crowned its first Tag Team Champions when, in a rematch from the precedent ladder match, El Mosco and Depredador beat Rey Misterio, Sr. and Halloween. One day later, in Tlalnepantla, the new champions defended successfully the belts against El Dólar & El Duende, but were challenged by Damián and Halloween. In the same show, the match take place, being won by the members of La Familia de Tijuana. On June 17, 2001, the last day of the tour, Sabu pinned Nosawa in a deathmatch.

=== X-LAW XMAS ===
On December 16, 2001, was held the X-LAW XMAS show in Unidad Deportiva Javier Rojo Gómez, Tulancingo. In that show, X-LAW crowned its first Jr. Heavyweight Champion in a ladder three-way dance where the winner would take the belt, while the two losers would face in a lucha de apuestas match. The competitors were Crazy Boy, Brazo de Plata Jr. and Pirata Morgan, Jr. The winner was Brazo de Plata Jr., so he was awarded with the belt. In the apuestas match, Crazy Boy shaved the Pirate, then bet his mask against Brazo de Plata's belt. The new champion agreed, and right there start the match, which was won by Crazy Boy.

== Championships ==
=== Current champions ===
Championship	Champion(s)	Previous	Date Won	Location
X-LAW Heavyweight Championship	LA Park	Nicho el Millonario	August 8, 2004	Auditorio de Tijuana
X-LAW International Championship	Sabu	Damián 666	October 30, 2010	Arena López Mateos, Tlalnepantla
Junior Heavyweight Championship	Daga	Super Crazy & Joe Lider	February 19, 2012	Arena López Mateos, Tlalnepantla
X-LAW Tag Team Championship	Vacant	La Familia de Tijuana (Damian 666 and Halloween )	April 4, 2004	
X-LAW Welterweight Championship	Serval	Inaugural	March 20, 2010	Plaza de Toros de Tula, HGO
X-LAW Women's Championship	A☆YU☆MI	Inaugural	May 29, 2009	Circo Volador, Mexico City

== See also ==
- List of professional wrestling promotions in Mexico
- lucha libre
