= Super Crazy =

Mexican professional wrestler (born 1973)

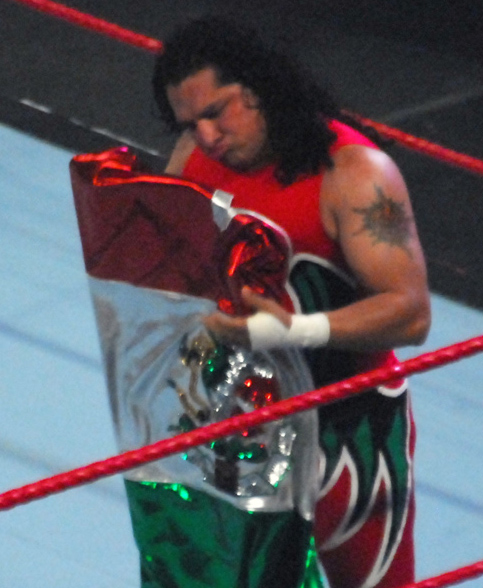
- Super Crazy in 2009

Personal information
- Born: Francisco Islas Rueda; December 3, 1973 (age 52) Tulancingo, Hidalgo, Mexico
- Spouse: Marina Yanagi (m. 1991)
- Children: 3

Professional wrestling career
- Ring name(s): Histeria; El Locco; Super Crazy; Super Loco; Super Virus
- Billed height: 1.73 m (5 ft 8 in)
- Billed weight: 95 kg (209 lb)
- Billed from: Tulancingo, Hidalgo, Mexico Mexico City, Mexico (ECW) Monterey, Mexico (ECW)
- Trained by: Rey Cuervero; Rey Pantera
- Debut: February 4, 1988

Francisco Islas Rueda (born December 3, 1973), better known by his ring name Super Crazy, is a Mexican professional wrestler. He currently performs on the independent circuit. He also makes appearances for Pro Wrestling Noah. As Super Crazy, Islas gained American exposure by working for Extreme Championship Wrestling (ECW) between 1998 and 2000 and for World Wrestling Entertainment (WWE) between 2005 and 2008. He has also toured Japan on several occasions, working for New Japan Pro-Wrestling (NJPW), Pro Wrestling Zero-One (Zero-1) and All Japan Pro Wrestling (AJPW). He is also In Mexico, Islas has previous worked for Asistencia Asesoría y Administración (AAA) and made appearances for various independent promotions but is not currently associated with one specific Mexican promotion.

== Professional wrestling career ==
=== Early career (1988–2000) ===
Francisco Islas made his professional wrestling debut in February 1988, at just 14 years of age, after being trained by his older brother Rey Pantera. Islas took the ring name "Super Crazy". He initially worked as an enmascarado, or masked wrestler, but lost the mask just over a month after his debut when he lost a Luchas de Apuestas (a "bet match") to El Seminarista in March 1988. From 1988 until 1995, Super Crazy was a mainstay on the Mexican independent circuit working for various promotions, including appearances for the Universal Wrestling Association (UWA) in the year leading up to its closure. In the UWA, Super Crazy won the UWA World Welterweight Championship on November 17, 1995, and held the title when the UWA closed in December 1995.

After the UWA closed Super Crazy still used and defended the UWA title on various independent shows but once he signed with the AAA promotion in 1996 the title was not mentioned. In AAA he was given a new gimmick, a masked Rudo (villain or heel) character called "Histeria" (sometimes Anglicised as "Hysteria"). Together with Abismo Negro, Maniaco, Mosco de la Merced I and Mach-1 he comprised a wrestling group called Rudos de la Galaxia (Spanish for "The bad guys of the galaxy"), a group that was involved in a storyline feud with a tecnico (good guy or face) group called Los Cadetos del Espacio (Spanish for "the Space Cadets"). In September 1997, Islas left AAA, giving the "Histeria" name and outfit to another AAA wrestler who had worked as "Quarterback" up until that time and who still wrestles as Histeria today.

Islas resumed working as "Super Crazy" when he left AAA to join the newly created Promo Azteca. Super Crazy also continued his feud with Venum, who now worked as "Venum Black" after leaving AAA, a feud that culminated in a "mask vs. hair" Luchas de Apuesta that Super Crazy won, unmasking Venum Black. After leaving AAA Super Crazy began defending the UWA World Welterweight title, losing it to Kid Guzmán in 1997. Super Crazy regained the title on June 15, 1998, during a show in Japan and successfully defended the title until October 13, 2000, where he lost it to El Oriental.

=== World Wrestling Federation (1997, 1998–1999) ===
In the spring of 1997 Islas, as Histeria, made a couple of appearances for the World Wrestling Federation (WWF) due to an AAA/WWF working agreement. Histeria worked mainly against Los Cadetos del Espacio, especially Venum in his appearances on RAW is WAR and Shotgun.

In November 1997 Islas began working for WWF under the name "Super Loco", mainly on their Super Astros shows, his only "Main show" appearance was a loss to El Águila in the first round of the WWF Light Heavyweight Championship tournament.

In November 1998, Islas returned to the WWF for WWF Super Astros when the program debuted. Super Astros ended in May 1999 and Islas left the WWF.

=== Extreme Championship Wrestling (1998–2001) ===
==== Early years (1998–2000) ====
Super Crazy was signed to a contract by Extreme Championship Wrestling (ECW) owner Paul Heyman in 1998 after Heyman saw him work for the WWF and on the recommendation of Konnan who had worked for Heyman. Crazy defeated Antifaz del Nortre in his televised ECW debut on the December 31 episode of Hardcore TV. He was brought in to showcase cruiserweight action and was paired with other smaller wrestlers in a series of well-received matches for the next two years.

His first major rivalry in the cruiserweight division came against Yoshihiro Tajiri as the duo competed against each other in a series of matches in the first half of 1999, where the duo exchanged wins on Hardcore TV, supercards and the Guilty as Charged and the Living Dangerously pay-per-view events. Crazy followed with participation in a series of matches with international cruiserweights as he racked up wins against fellow luchador Mosco de la Merced at CyberSlam, Japanese wrestler Taka Michinoku at Hardcore Heaven while losing to Italian Little Guido at Hostile City Showdown and defeating him at July's Heat Wave pay-per-view.

Crazy closed the year with two high-profile three-way dance matches, the first against Tajiri and Guido at Anarchy Rulz and the second against Tajiri and Jerry Lynn at November to Remember. In the end of the year, Crazy joined forces with rival Tajiri and defeated Jerry Lynn and Little Guido in a tag team match at Guilty as Charged on January 9, 2000.

==== World Television Champion and various feuds (2000–2001) ====
Super Crazy was booked to win a tournament in March for the World Television Championship after the title had been vacated by Rob Van Dam due to an injury. He defeated CW Anderson in the quarter-final round on March 4, Little Guido in the semi-final round and Rhino in the final round at the Living Dangerously pay-per-view, despite interference from The Network. Crazy made his first televised title defense against Rhino on the March 31 episode of ECW on TNN. He dropped the title to Yoshihiro Tajiri in a three-way dance, also involving Little Guido on the April 14 episode of ECW on TNN. After the title loss, Crazy faced Guido and Kid Kash in a three-way dance at CyberSlam, which Guido won.

Super Crazy went on a hiatus for the next few months until pre-taped vignettes began airing on television in October, which hyped his return at the November to Remember pay-per-view. He was initially booked to face CW Anderson at the event but he was replaced by Kid Kash. Later in the night, he participated in a match for the World Tag Team Championship between the Unholy Alliance (Yoshihiro Tajiri and Mikey Whipwreck) and Full Blooded Italians (Little Guido and Tony Mamaluke). Crazy substituted for Whipwreck after the latter got injured. FBI retained the titles. Crazy teamed with Unholy Alliance against Hot Commodity (E. Z. Money, Julio Dinero and Chris Hamrick) in a six-man tag team match on the November 19 episode of Hardcore TV. Crazy's team lost and the Unholy Alliance turned on him when Whipwreck helped Tajiri in defeating Crazy in a match. Crazy brought Kid Kash as his mystery partner against Unholy Alliance in a tag team match at Massacre on 34th Street on December 3, which Crazy's team lost. Crazy and Kash were pitted against Unholy Alliance and Full Blooded Italians in a three-way dance at ECW's final pay-per-view Guilty as Charged on January 7, 2001. Unholy Alliance won the match. Crazy performed at ECW's final show on January 13, where he lost to Tajiri. ECW folded down as it was bought by WWF due to the bankruptcy.

=== Independent circuit and Japan (2001–2005) ===
After ECW folded, Super Crazy wrestled for different promotions in the US, including the hardcore promotions Xtreme Pro Wrestling (XPW) and Combat Zone Wrestling (CZW), cementing his status as "the Extreme Luchador" or "the Insane Luchador". He also began working for Puerto Rico-based International Wrestling Association (IWA). At Ring of Honor's debut show, The Era of Honor Begins on February 23, 2002, Crazy defeated Eddie Guerrero to become the inaugural IWA Intercontinental Heavyweight Champion. He was defeated for the title on April 6 by Andy Anderson. Crazy regained the title on April 13 when Anderson forfeited it due to injury. Crazy lost the title once more on April 20, when he was defeated by Anarchy. Super Crazy also held the IWA Hardcore Championship on nine occasions between 2002 and 2005. He also held the IWA World Junior Heavyweight Championship three times in that time period. On February 24, 2001, Super Crazy defeated Pablo Marquez to win the UWA World Junior Heavyweight Championship, which like the UWA Welterweight title was still used on the independent scene in Mexico and Puerto Rico. By the end of 2001 Super Crazy vacated the UWA Junior Heavyweight title. Super Crazy made a couple of special appearances for his old company AAA, teaming with El Alebrije and Randy to defeat Máscara Magligna, Pentagón and Monsther at the 2001 Verano de Escandalo. At the following year's Verano de Escandalo Super Crazy teamed with Mr. Águila, La Parka and Latin Lover to defeat Cibernético, Heavy Metal, Héctor Garza and Leatherface.

He made four tours with New Japan Pro-Wrestling (NJPW) in 2002 and 2003. His first tour lasted from November to December 2002 and saw Super Crazy work mainly tag matches, teaming mainly with Koji Kanemoto and/or The Stampede Kid against a variety of opponents including Jushin Thunder Liger, El Samurai and Heat. His second tour took place in February 2003 and saw Super Crazy team up mainly with Curry Man and Tiger Mask. Super Crazy mainly faced Jushin Thunder Liger's CTU faction. The third tour took place in May 2003, this time Super Crazy often worked with other Luchadors touring NJPW at the time including Último Guerrero, Rey Bucanero and Sangre Azteca. His fourth, and so far final, NJPW tour took place in October and November 2003, again Crazy mainly worked in tag team matches, siding with Koji Kanemoto or Tiger Mask against a variety of opponents. Super Crazy appeared on the March 5, 2003 edition of Total Nonstop Action Wrestling's weekly PPV's as one of Konnan's luchador challengers, where he lost to Jerry Lynn. Between January and March 2005 Super Crazy worked for the Japanese promotion Pro Wrestling ZERO-ONE, winning the ZERO-ONE/UPW/WORLD-1 International Junior Heavyweight Championship from Tatsuhito Takaiwa on December 18, 2004. Crazy lost the title to Ikuto Hidaka on April 14, 2005, at Zero-1's Outburst Revolution show.

=== World Wrestling Entertainment (2005-2008) ===
==== The Mexicools (2005–2006) ====
In 2005, Super Crazy signed a contract with World Wrestling Entertainment (WWE). He initially appeared at the WWE-promoted ECW One Night Stand on June 12, 2005, winning an international three-way dance by pinning Yoshihiro Tajiri in the final pinfall of the match, which also involved Little Guido Maritato During the match, he performed a moonsault from a second story balcony.

Super Crazy's first appearance on WWE television came during the June 18, 2005 airing of SmackDown!'s sister show WWE Velocity, teaming with Psicosis to defeat Akio and Billy Kidman. Psicosis, Super Crazy, and Juventud grouped together to form a stable known as the Mexicools. The group made their debut as heels on the June 23, edition of SmackDown! when all three members rode to the ring on John Deere lawn mowers with the decals altered to say Juan Deere (John in Spanish) and wearing matching coveralls. They then attacked Chavo Guerrero and Paul London during their Cruiserweight Championship match. Juventud cut a promo questioning the lack of "true Mexican luchadores" in the Cruiserweight Division, before going on to deride the current state of Mexican Americans in general. Psicosis dubbed the lawnmower they arrived on a "Mexican Limo 2005" and the group claimed that even Mexico's president mocks Mexicans in the United States (in reference to Vicente Fox's controversial remark that Mexican immigrants do the jobs "not even the blacks want to do"). Juventud then stated that they were "no longer there to clean toilets and work for "them" (the "gringos") but "they" were going to be working for "us" (The Mexicools)", before dubbing the team "not Mexicans but Mexicools!" In the following weeks, they continued to interfere in matches and mock the stereotypical image of Mexicans in the United States.

Despite being introduced as heels, the group quickly became favorites of the audience and eventually began acting as faces. They received strong approval from the audience even during their debut, which occurred in Tucson, Arizona. The Mexicools' first PPV debut was on July 24 at The Great American Bash, defeating bWo in a six-man tag team match. During the December 2 SmackDown!, Super Crazy and Psicosis competed in an over the top rope battle royal against 5 other tag teams. The pair managed to win and earned themselves a match against MNM at Armageddon for the WWE Tag Team Championship. Unfortunately for the Mexicools, MNM lost the tag team titles before their match. Not long after, Super Crazy and Psicosis became the only Mexicools left in WWE, as Juventud was released from WWE on January 6, 2006. Super Crazy and Psicosis continued to wrestle as a tag team, but Super Crazy got his own push as a singles competitor, eventually earning himself #1 contendership for the WWE Cruiserweight Championship. By June 2006 Super Crazy's partnership with Psicosis on SmackDown! began to crumble when Psicosis repeatedly abandoned Super Crazy during incidents with monster heel The Great Khali. This resulted in the pairing splitting up and then engaging in a short-lived feud after Psicosis turned heel. After the breakup, both Psicosis and Super Crazy disappeared off WWE programming.

==== Singles competition (2006–2008) ====
On September 4, Super Crazy made his Raw debut match and defeated Chris Masters using his trademark moonsault. Super Crazy continued his feud with Masters throughout September, defeated him once more and competing with Masters, along with four other wrestlers (Johnny Nitro, Carlito, Jeff Hardy and Randy Orton) in a Six-Pack Challenge Match for the WWE Intercontinental Championship on the September 18 edition of Raw, which neither Masters or Super Crazy were able to win. Super Crazy was then involved in angles with Nitro and Melina, during which he was aligned with Mickie James, who was feuding with Melina at the time.

Super Crazy suffered an injury to his left knee at a house show which occurred on April 21, 2007, in Oberhausen, Germany. The injury was believed to be a MCL tear. Super Crazy returned to action on June 1 in a match taped for Heat, losing to the returning William Regal. On the July 2 of Raw, Super Crazy was Mr. Kennedy's opponent in a Beat the Clock match. Before the match began, Super Crazy appeared to have agreed to let Kennedy win, however, he defeated Kennedy with a roll-up shortly after the match began, while Kennedy was performing his introduction. Kennedy assaulted Super Crazy later that night. Kennedy then defeated Super Crazy in a grudge match two weeks later. In October 2007, Super Crazy formed a tag team with Jim Duggan. The team primarily competed on Heat to moderate success until Super Crazy was drafted to the ECW brand.

As part of the 2008 WWE Supplemental Draft, Super Crazy was drafted to the ECW brand. Super Crazy returned to SmackDown (although wearing an ECW shirt), losing to The Brian Kendrick. On the August 19 episode of ECW on Sci-Fi, Super Crazy debuted on the ECW brand, teaming with Evan Bourne and Tommy Dreamer against and lost to John Morrison, Chavo Guerrero and The Miz. On the September 5 episode of SmackDown, he defeated Ryan Braddock but was kicked by Vladimir Kozlov after the match. On the October 17 episode of SmackDown, he lost to Kendrick's bodyguard, Ezekiel Jackson. Super Crazy's last WWE match took place the following week on the October 24 episode of SmackDown, losing to Kendrick. On November 5, 2008, WWE announced that Islas had requested and granted his release from his WWE contract, due to being unhappy with his spot in the company.

=== Return to independent circuit (2008–present) ===
Shortly after his release from the WWE Super Crazy returned to Mexico, working a series of shows for El Hijo del Perro Aguayo's Perros del Mal Producciones. Super Crazy wrestled several matches against the "Los Perros del Mal" group, and reuniting for one night with his former The Mexicools teammate Juventud Guerrera. On January 10, 2009, Super Crazy defeated X-Fly (former Rudos del Galaxia teammate Mosco de la Merced under a new name) in a "Hair vs. Hair" Luchas de Apuestas His latest appearance for Los Perros del Mal saw Super Crazy side with Los Perros, teaming with Perro Aguayo Jr. and Damian 666 losing to the team of LA Par-K, Olímpico and Super Porky on June 20, 2009.

On February 14, 2009, Super Crazy made his return to International Wrestling Association in Puerto Rico where he won the Intercontinental Heavyweight Championship for a third time by defeating Joe Bravo. Super Crazy held the title until May 16, 2009, where he lost the title to Rick Stanley at IWA's Juicio Final Show. On May 2, 2009, he challenged Blue Demon Jr. for the NWA World Heavyweight Championship on an event in Tyler, Texas, but was defeated. Super Crazy received a second shot at the World title on August 9, 2009, in a match that also included Oliver John but once again came up short On August 8, 2009, Super Crazy made a surprise appearance for Xtreme Latin American Wrestling (X–LAW) where he defeated Panama Jack Daniels in an unannounced match to become the promotion's new Junior Heavyweight Champion. Super Crazy defended the X–LAW Junior Heavyweight Championship on September 8, 2009, against Halloween and Nosawa in a three-way death match.

On January 30, 2010, as part of WrestleReunion 4, Super Crazy made his debut for Pro Wrestling Guerrilla, where he was defeated by Human Tornado.

On June 6, 2010, Super Crazy appeared at AAA's Triplemanía XVIII as a representative of Perros del Mal Producciones. On June 20, 2010, Super Crazy was a surprise at AAA's television taping in Zapopan, Jalisco. He would team with Foreign Legion members Chessman and Alex Koslov losing to Extreme Tiger, Joe Líder and Nicho el Millonario. During the main event, Crazy along with Los Perros del Mal attacked Dr. Wagner Jr.

On December 5, 2010, Super Crazy wrestled for Xplosión Nacional de Lucha (XNL) in Chile, facing XL and Giger in a three–way, two–fall match, where the first fall would be contested for XL's XNL Championship and the second for Crazy's X–LAW Junior Heavyweight Championship. In the first fall Crazy pinned XL to win the XNL Championship, but the roles were reversed in the second fall, when XL pinned Crazy to win the X–LAW Junior Heavyweight Championship.

In 2010 and 2011, Super Crazy represented Los Perros del Mal in the group's feud with Los Psycho Circus. On May 29, 2011, at Perros del Mal Producciones' third anniversary show, the two groups faced each other in a six man tag team steel cage Masks vs. Hairs Lucha de Apuesta, which ended with Super Crazy being left in the cage, forcing him to have his head shaved bald.

Crazy returned to NXL at Desastre Total 2011, where he defeated Katastrofe, retaining the XNL Championship and winning the X-LAW Junior Heavyweight Championship for a second time. At February 19, 2012, he lost the X-LAW title to Daga, in a match where Joe Líder was also involved.

On June 2, 2012, Crazy debuted in Xtrem Mexican Championship's Aniversario, where he won the XMC Championship after he defeated the previous champion X-Fly and Necro Butcher. He lost the XNL Championship against Ariki Toa at XNL's Contraataque 2012.

In 2014 Crazy and Mistic Azteca founded their own independent wrestling organization, World of Unpredictable Wrestling Mexico.

=== Pro Wrestling Noah (2012–2015; 2022–present) ===
In 2012, he wrestled for a month with Japanese promotion Pro Wrestling Noah, where he had a lot of matches, including a match against Ricky Marvin for the XNL Championship and a title match against the GHC Junior Heavyweight Tag Team Champions de ANMU (Atsushi Aoki and Kotaro Suzuki) with Marvin, but they were defeated. In July 2012, he returned to Noah. On July 22, Crazy, along with Ricky Marvin, defeated Special Assault Team (Atsushi Aoki and Kotaro Suzuki), won the GHC Heavyweight Junior Tag Team Championship. On September 20, Crazy and Marvin made their debuts for Wrestling New Classic (WNC), defeating El Hijo del Pantera and Yusuke Kodama in a tag team match. On March 10, 2013, Crazy and Marvin lost the GHC Junior Heavyweight Tag Team Championship to Genba Hirayanagi and Maybach Taniguchi Jr. Crazy spent the first six months of 2013 in Mexico.

In June 2013, he returned to Noah with his nephew Pesadilla, in the Southern Navigation tour. In July, Los Mexitosos entered in the NTV G+ Cup Junior Heavyweight Tag League for the vacant GHC Junior Heavyweight Tag Team Championship. However, they lost, with only six points. In late 2013, Crazy and Pesadilla returned to Noah as Crazy Dynasty. The duo wrestled a losing effort to Jushin Thunder Liger and Tiger Mask IV on November 11 for the GHC Junior Heavyweight Tag Team Championship.

Crazy made a return to Noah yet again on March 8, 2014, at Great Voyage in Tokyo, where he won a three-way dance against Jonah Rock and Xtra Large. He continued to make appearances for NOAH throughout 2014 including teaming with Matt Striker in the 2014 Junior Heavyweight Tag League. The pair finished third in their block with four points and after another two-month hiatus, Super Crazy received a GHC Junior Heavyweight Championship opportunity against champion Daisuke Harada at Great Voyage in Yokohama on October 12. Crazy lost the match and returned to teaming under the Crazy Dynasty name with Pesadilla throughout the year, culminating in a losing effort to Kenoh and Hajime Ohara in a Tables, Ladders, and Chairs match for the GHC Junior Heavyweight Tag Team Championships on December 27 at Korakuen Hall.

On March 15, Crazy appeared in Noah for the first time that year at Great Voyage in Tokyo, teaming with Jonah Rock, Yoshinari Ogawa, and Zack Sabre Jr. in a losing effort to Captain Noah, Taiji Ishimori, Muhammad Yone, and Katsuhiko Nakajima. Crazy replaced Takeshi Morishima in the 2015 Global Tag League and teamed with Mitsuhiro Kitamiya, marking Crazy's first heavyweight tournament in Noah. The team failed to win a match and finished last in their block with zero points. From July 18 to August 5, Crazy took part in Noah's Global Junior Heavyweight League. Despite winning his first three matches jumping out to an early lead in his block, Crazy lost his final three matches including a match on the final day against Bengala (played by former partner Ricky Marvin) which would have brought Crazy into at least a tie for first place in his block. Alas, Crazy finished in a four-way tie for third place with six points. In September, Crazy teamed with Hitoshi Kumano in the Global Junior Tag League marking Crazy's fourth consecutive appearance in the tournament. The pairing won only one match and finished last in their block with just two points. Crazy continued to work for Noah throughout 2015 with his final appearance coming on December 4 where he teamed with Genba Hirayanagi to defeat Kumano and Ogawa.

On January 5, 2022, Crazy made his return to Noah competing in a six man tag team match as a member of Los Perros del Mal de Japón.

=== All Japan Pro Wrestling (2009–2010) ===
In July 2009 Super Crazy traveled to Japan to participate in All Japan Pro Wrestling's Junior League. Super Crazy qualified for the semifinal by defeating Nosawa Rongai and Toshizo and wrestling to a draw against Kaz Hayashi. In the semifinal Super Crazy defeated Minoru but was defeated by Shuji Kondo in the final on August 7. While in Japan Super Crazy also made an appearance for HUSTLE, working as "Super Virus", teaming with Devil Pierroth and Rey Ohara, losing to KG, Shiro Koshinaka and Taijiri.

== Personal life ==
Islas is married to Marina Yanagi and they have three children together. He has a tattoo of a sun on one of his upper biceps, as well as a Mexican designed signature tattoo on the other. Islas' brother, cousin and nephew are also professional wrestlers, and they compete under the ring names Rey Cuervero, Crazy Boy and Pesadilla, respectively.

Islas appeared in a German television contest between Joko Winterscheidt and Klaas Heufer-Umlauf when one of them had to wrestle alongside Islas. Islas had previously taught them several basics of lucha libre.

== Championships and accomplishments ==
- All Japan Pro Wrestling
  - World Junior Heavyweight Championship (1 time)
  - AJPW Junior Tag League (2010) – with Bushi
- Allied Independent Wrestling Federations
  - AIWF Latin American Championship (1 time)
- California Lucha Libre
  - CaLL Championship (1 time)
- Catch Wrestling Association
  - CWA World Junior Heavyweight Championship (1 time)
- Caution Wrestling Federation
  - CWF Continental Championship (1 time)
- Coastal Championship Wrestling
  - Hardcore Cup (2021)
- Colombia Pro Wrestling
  - CPW International Grand Championship (1 time)
- Extreme Championship Wrestling
  - ECW World Television Championship (1 time)
  - ECW World Television Championship Tournament (2000)
- Global Les Catch
  - GLC Extreme Championship (1 time)
- International Wrestling Association
  - IWA Hardcore Championship (9 times)
  - IWA Intercontinental Heavyweight Championship (3 times)
  - IWA World Junior Heavyweight Championship (3 times)
  - UWA World Junior Heavyweight Championship (3 times)
- International Wrestling Revolution Group
  - Guerra de Empresas (January 2011) - with X-Fly
- International Wrestling League
  - IWL International Championship (1 time)
  - IWL International Tag Team Championship (1 time) – with Scorpio Jr.
- NWA: Extreme Canadian Championship Wrestling
  - NWA Canadian Junior Heavyweight Championship (1 time)
- Pro Wrestling Illustrated
  - PWI ranked him #198 of the 500 best singles wrestlers during the PWI Years in 2003
  - PWI ranked him #37 of the top 500 singles wrestlers in the PWI 500 in 1999
- Pro Wrestling Noah
  - GHC Junior Heavyweight Tag Team Championship (1 time) – with Ricky Marvin
  - NTV G+ Cup Junior Heavyweight Tag League Technique Award (2014) – with Matt Striker
- Pro Wrestling Power
  - PWP Tag Team Championship (1 time) - with Kobra
- Pro Wrestling Zero1
  - ZERO-ONE/UPW/WORLD-1 International Junior Heavyweight Championship (1 time)
- Súper X Grand Prix Championship Wrestling
  - NWE Cruiserweight Championship (1 time)
  - Super X Championship (1 time)
- Universal Wrestling Association
  - UWA World Welterweight Championship (2 times)
- Universal Wrestling Entertainment
  - UWE Tag Team Championship (1 time) - with Ricky Marvin
- Xplosión Nacional de Lucha
  - XNL World Championship (1 time)
- Xtreme Latin American Wrestling
  - X–LAW Junior Heavyweight Championship (2 times)
- Xtreme Mexican Wrestling
  - XMW World Championship (1 time)
- World of Unpredictable Wrestling
  - WUW World Championship (1 time)
- World Of Wrestling Team
  - WOWT Championship (1 time)

== Luchas de Apuestas record ==
Winner (wager)	Loser (wager)	Location	Event	Date	Notes
El Seminarista (mask)	Super Crazy (mask)	Nezahualcoyotl, Mexico State	Live event	March 1988	
Super Crazy (hair)	Kid Guzmán (hair)	Nezahualcoyotl, Mexico State	Live event	1996	
Super Crazy (hair)	Venum Black (mask)	Nezahualcoyotl, Mexico State	Live event	March 6, 1998	
Zumbido (hair)	Super Crazy (hair)	Mexico City	48. Aniversario de Arena México	April 30, 2004	
Super Crazy (hair)	X-Fly (hair)	Ciudad Madero, Tamaulipas	Live event	January 10, 2009	(Note: Relevos suicida match: lost a match to Scorpio, Jr. and Zumbido, Damián 666 and Mr. Águila.)
Psycho Clown (mask)	Super Crazy (hair)	Mexico City	Perros del Mal Anniversary	May 29, 2011	(Note: Six man tag team steel cage Masks vs. Hairs match, where Los Perros del Mal (Crazy, El Hijo del Perro Aguayo and Damián 666) faced Los Psycho Circus (Psycho Clown, Monster Clown and Murder Clown).)
Super Crazy (hair)	El Felino (hair)	Mexico City	Lucha Elite show	February 28, 2016	
Rey Bucanero (hair)	Super Crazy (hair)	Mexico City	CMLL 83rd Anniversary Show	September 2, 2016	
