= Psicosis =

Mexican professional wrestler (born 1971)

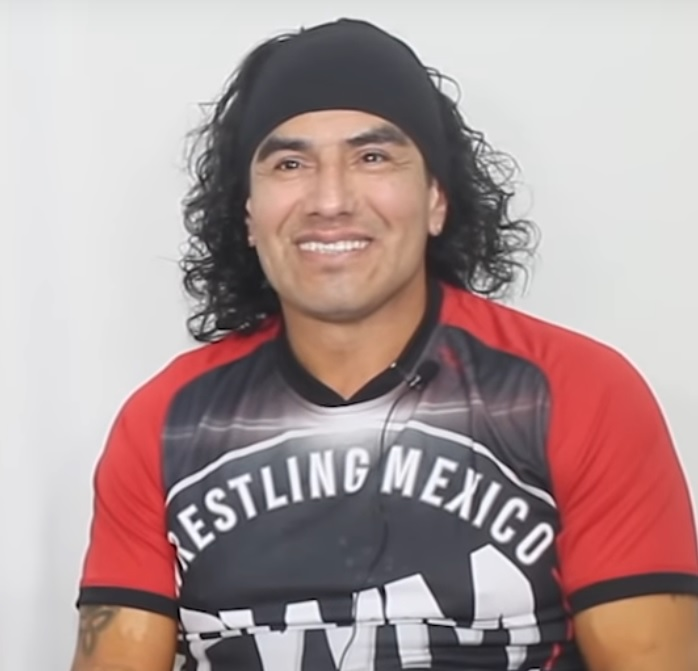
- Castellanos in 2019

Personal information
- Born: Dionicio Castellanos Torres; May 19, 1971 (age 55) Tijuana, Baja California, Mexico
- Spouse: Anna Sabo (m. 2006)
- Children: 4, including Millonario Jr.

Professional wrestling career
- Ring name(s): El Jet de Tijuana; El Millonario de Tijuana; El Salvaje; Nicho; Nicho el Millonario; Psicosis; Psicosis the Millionaire; Psychosis
- Billed height: 5 ft 10 in (178 cm)
- Billed weight: 200 lb (91 kg)
- Billed from: Tijuana, Mexico
- Trained by: Rey Misterio
- Debut: March 11, 1989

Dionicio Castellanos Torres (born May 19, 1971) is a Mexican professional wrestler, better known by the ring names Psicosis (sometimes Anglicised as Psychosis) and Nicho el Millonario. He is currently signed to WWE under a Legends contract. Castellanos is best known for his appearances with the Mexican promotions Lucha Libre AAA Worldwide, Consejo Mundial de Lucha Libre, and the World Wrestling Association, as well as his appearances in the United States with Extreme Championship Wrestling, World Championship Wrestling, and Total Nonstop Action Wrestling. Championships held by Castellanos include the AAA World Tag Team Championship, WWA World Junior Light Heavyweight Championship, WWA World Welterweight Championship, and WWA World Trios Championship. He is considered a major figure within Mexican hardcore wrestling and has been dubbed "el Padre de la lucha extrema".

== Professional wrestling career ==
=== Early career (1989–1996) ===
Castellanos debuted as "El Salvaje" after being trained by Rey Misterio and his brother, Fobia. He often teamed with Fobia and wore face paint. In March 1989, Castellanos began wrestling as "Psicosis" for the local promotion in his native Baja California, where some of his biggest feuds pitted him against El Hijo del Santo and Rey Mysterio Jr. He would eventually wrestle Mysterio Jr. over five hundred times throughout this career. He also frequently feuded with La Parka as well as Juventud Guerrera and Fuerza Guerrera.

Psicosis first made a name for himself in the United States through AAA's 1994 pay-per-view broadcast When Worlds Collide, where he, Fuerza Guerrera, and Madonna's Boyfriend defeated Heavy Metal, Latin Lover, and Rey Mysterio Jr.

=== Extreme Championship Wrestling (1995) ===
Psicosis debuted in the United States-promotion Extreme Championship Wrestling in September 1995, facing Mysterio Jr. in a critically acclaimed bout at Gangstas Paradise. Psicosis was recruited by ECW booker Paul Heyman – who was seeking new talent to replace Chris Benoit, Eddie Guerrero and Dean Malenko, all of whom had recently left the promotion – at the recommendation of Konnan.

=== World Championship Wrestling (1996-2000) ===
==== Early years (1996–1998) ====
Castellanos signed with World Championship Wrestling in 1996, anglicizing his name to "Psychosis." His debut pitted him against Konnan at Clash of the Champions XXXII. Through the early years, Psychosis would typically face other luchadores, frequently getting a midcard spot during pay-per-view events. He engaged in a feud with Último Dragón, first working as the fan favorite. He was later signed by Dragon's former manager Sonny Onoo, turning into a villain in the process. During the entire length of the feud, he was unable to defeat the Dragon. He then began teaming with La Parka under Onoo's tutelage. After Onoo dropped them in favor of Yuji Nagata, the team began to break up, with La Parka attacking Psychosis after the matches. He beat La Parka at Spring Stampede on April 19, 1998. In 1998, Psychosis joined Eddie Guerrero's Latino World Order (LWO) group, which consisted entirely of Mexican professional wrestlers. The group was disbanded by Ric Flair on the January 11 episode of Nitro.

==== Cruiserweight Champion (1999–2000) ====
During the April 19 episode of Nitro, Psychosis defeated Blitzkrieg, Juventud Guerrera, and Rey Mysterio in a four-way bout to win the WCW World Cruiserweight Championship for the first time. This reign was short-lived however, as he lost it to Rey Mysterio one week later.

Psychosis originally lost his mask to Rey Misterio during a tour of Mexico, as he removed the mask and handed it to Mysterio Jr. while simultaneously covering his face with a towel. He also lost the mask to Billy Kidman on the September 27 episode of Nitro, revealing his face to the American audience. On occasion, he was also paired with Juventud Guerrera, and when the latter won the IWGP Junior Heavyweight Title, Guerrera was kayfabe injured and had Psychosis defend the title. In reality, Guerrera and Jerry Flynn were arrested on DUI charges; Psychosis immediately lost the belt to previous champion Jushin Thunder Liger. Neither Juventud Guerrera's championship win nor Psicosis' title defense was recognized by New Japan Pro-Wrestling until 2007. Psychosis had a second Cruiserweight title reign in WCW shortly after unmasking, when the previous champion Lenny Lane, who portrayed a flamboyant homosexual on television, got WCW in trouble with GLAAD. As a result, Lane was pulled from television and Psychosis was given the belt to defend. The WCW announcers claimed that he had won it at a house show. However, on his first televised appearance with the title, Psychosis lost it to Disco Inferno. This earned him the dubious distinction of having lost two titles he never won.

=== Return to Extreme Championship Wrestling (2000) ===
Psychosis was officially released from financially suffering WCW in March 2000, after a backstage incident at a Thunder taping, where he and Juventud Guerrera ran over Brad Armstrong. This resulted in his brief return to Extreme Championship Wrestling that spanned from July to November 2000. The highlight of his second run was a match with Yoshihiro Tajiri at the ECW Arena, as well as an appearance at the Heat Wave pay-per-view, competing in a four-way dance against Yoshihiro Tajiri, Mikey Whipwreck, and Little Guido. Much like WCW, ECW was on the brink of demise and soon folded.

=== Independent circuit (2000–2005) ===
Psychosis was then part of the short-lived Xcitement Wrestling Federation and World Wrestling All-Stars promotions, and had a brief stint in All Japan Pro Wrestling. He had a lengthy run in Xtreme Pro Wrestling, aligning himself with Konnan, Juventud Guerrera, Halloween, and Damien as "La Familia." Psychosis then wrestled on early Total Nonstop Action Wrestling weekly pay-per-views. He also participated in the NWA Wrestling Showcase shows.

Psychosis had a dispute with AAA in Mexico which held the rights to his ring name, so he switched it to "Nicho El Millonario" and continued to work in Mexico, mostly in Tijuana with occasional dates in the United States and Consejo Mundial de Lucha Libre. Psicosis returned to Total Nonstop Action Wrestling in 2004 and wrestled at Victory Road 2004 as part of the 20-man international invitational. He was eliminated, and the tournament was won by fellow luchadore and former lWo member Héctor Garza. In 2005, he returned to AAA to feud with the wrestler who had assumed the name "Psicosis" in September 1997 when he originally left the promotion. The two had a "name vs. name" ladder match at Triplemania XIII, but Histeria ran in and took the name for himself. Consequently, the feud evolved into a three-way rivalry.

In 2005, Castellanos appeared in the independent documentary, 101 Reasons Not To Become A Professional Wrestler.

=== World Wrestling Entertainment (2005–2006) ===
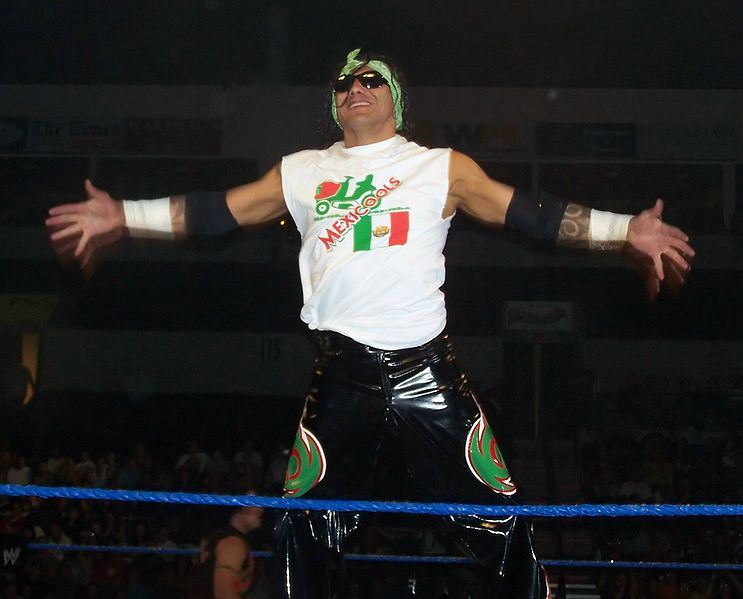
Psicosis during his time in WWE in 2006

In 2005, Castellanos signed a contract with World Wrestling Entertainment (WWE). He appeared at the WWE promoted ECW One Night Stand pay-per-view on June 12, losing to Rey Mysterio. His first WWE television appearance was on the June 18 airing of WWE Velocity, teaming with Super Crazy to defeat Akio and Billy Kidman. Psicosis, Super Crazy, and Juventud grouped together to form a faction known as the Mexicools. The group made their debut as heels on the June 23 episode of SmackDown! when all three members rode to the ring on a John Deere lawn mower, with the sticker saying Juan Deere to be more Mexican, wearing matching coveralls and attacked both Chavo Guerrero and Paul London during their WWE Cruiserweight Championship match. Juventud cut a promo questioning the lack of "true Mexican Luchadores" in the cruiserweight division, before going on to deride the state of Mexican Americans in general. Psicosis dubbed the lawn mower they arrived on a "Mexican Limo 2005" and the group claimed that even Mexico's President mocks Mexicans in the United States; this referenced Vicente Fox's controversial remark that Mexican immigrants do the jobs "not even the blacks want to do." Guerrera then stated that they were no longer there to clean toilets and work for "them" (the "gringos") but "they" were going to be working for "us" (The Mexicools)," before dubbing the team "not Mexicans but Mexicools!" In the following weeks, they would continue to make run-ins in matches and mock the stereotypical image of Mexicans in the United States, even coming to the ring each with their own riding lawn mower.

On July 24 at The Great American Bash in Buffalo, New York, they defeated Blue World Order in a six-man tag match when Psicosis pinned Steven Richards to secure the Mexicools' first pay-per-view win. The trio then turned face by feuding with Nunzio and Vito. During the December 2 episode of SmackDown! Super Crazy and Psicosis won a battle royal with 5 other tag teams, earning a match against MNM at Armageddon 2005 for the WWE Tag Team Championship. MNM lost the titles before their match, however, which meant that the Armageddon match was just a standard tag team match. During the January 27, 2006 episode of SmackDown! Super Crazy and Psicosis defeated The Dicks (Chad Wicks and John Toland) and the F.B.I. in a three-way tag team match to win spots in the 2006 Royal Rumble match on January 29. Psicosis entered at #4 in the Royal Rumble match but was quickly eliminated by his former WCW rival Rey Mysterio. During June 2006 the ECW brand was revived and with this came the expectations that Super Crazy would leave Psicosis and SmackDown! for the new ECW brand. This was later fueled with a match that would see Yoshihiro Tajiri and Super Crazy team up and face the F.B.I. at ECW One Night Stand. At this time, Psicosis' partnership with Super Crazy began to crumble when Psicosis abandoned Super Crazy during incidents with The Great Khali. The team split up, with Psicosis turning heel. On the July 21 episode of SmackDown!, Psicosis lost to Super Crazy. This was Psicosis' last WWE appearance. After a four-month inactivity, WWE announced that Castellanos was released from WWE in the fall of that year because of his arrest in Mexico on November 1, 2006.

=== Consejo Mundial de Lucha Libre (2006–2007) ===
Psicosis worked as "Nicho el Millonario" (after the main character in the soap opera El premio mayor) in Consejo Mundial de Lucha Libre (CMLL) up until 2007. At the end of 2006, he accidentally shattered his nose in a match against El Hijo de Rey Misterio, and also got his head shaved. He was rushed to a nearby hospital to get his nose set following the match.

=== Return to AAA (2007–2014) ===
On the March 3, 2007 televised episode of AAA, Psicosis came as Nicho and started a fight with Cibernético. He had worn a La Parka mask, pretending to be him, in order to get La Parka expelled from AAA. Psicosis then joined Halloween's new version of La Familia de Tijuana, along with Extreme Tiger, in AAA under the ring name Nicho el Millonario. He returned after an absence from the company and joined Joe Líder's new rudo stable, while helping attack La Familia de Tijuana and the Mexican Powers. On September 14, 2008, at Verano de Escandalo, Nicho and Joe Líder, known collectively as "La Hermandad Extrema" (the Extreme Brotherhood), won the AAA World Tag Team Championship by defeating Crazy Boy and Último Gladiador and The Hart Foundation 2.0 (Jack Evans and Teddy Hart) and champions Halloween and Extreme Tiger in a four-way ladder match. La Hermandad 187 are the longest reigning tag team champions, with a reign of 551 days. On March 19, 2010, they lost the championship to La Legión Extranjera representatives Taiji Ishimori and Takeshi Morishima. On June 6, 2010, at Triplemanía XVIII, La Hermandad 187 participated in a four-way elimination match for the AAA World Tag Team Championship. Lídereliminated the then reigning AAA World Tag Team Champions (Atsushi Aoki and Go Shiozaki) when he pinned Shiozaki. Later, Líder was pinned by James Storm of Beer Money, Inc. after interference from Konnan, denying them the chance to regain the tag team championship. Later in the night La Hermandad helped Cibernético beat up almost all the members of La Legión.

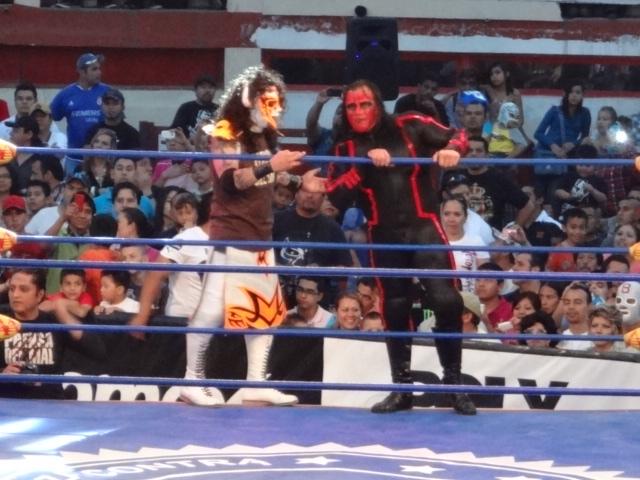
Psicosis and fellow Legión Extranjera member Chessman

Afterwards La Hermandad started feuding with La Sociedad, a superstable consisting of invaders from Los Perros del Mal and members of Los Maniacos, La Legión Extrangera and La Milicia, El Zorro and Hernandez in particular. La Hermandad received their rematch for the AAA World Tag Team Championship from Los Maniacos (Silver King and Último Gladiador) on September 19, 2010, but Líder was forced to enter the match without Nicho, who was taken out by El Zorro, Hernandez and La Legión the previous week, and was unable to regain the championship. At Héroes Inmortales IV Nicho and Líder gained a measure of revenge on Konnan by defeating him and Perros del Mal members Damián 666 and Halloween in a three–on–two handicap hardcore match. On October 30, 2010, El Zorro defeated Nicho in a Lucha de Apuesta to take his hair. On December 5 at Guerra de Titanes Nicho and Líder received a shot at the AAA World Tag Team Championship, but were unable to dethrone Los Maniacos in a three-way ladder match, which also included Hernandez and El Ilegal. During the first half of 2011, La Hermandad 187 started feuding with La Maniarquía (Chessman, Silver King and Último Gladiador), during which the rudo trio injured Nicho, forcing him out of Triplemanía XIX on June 18. At the event Nicho tried to interfere in the match between Líder, Electroshock and Heavy Metal and La Maniarquía, but was stopped by AAA president Joaquín Roldan, who suspended him from AAA for his interference and had him removed the arena. Prior to the start of his three-month-long suspension, Nicho appeared at the June 30 tapings, voicing his displeasure over the suspension, claiming that he had been there for the company from the beginning even though they had given his name (Psicosis) to another performer "not even close to his level", before noting that he had a son and that if he was suspended without pay, he would have to find work from another promotion. Nicho returned to AAA on July 16, threatening Roldan, which led to Joe Líder trying to calm his partner down. This in turn led to Nicho declaring that if Líder was with Roldan, they were no longer friends. Later in the event, Nicho interfered in Líder's match and turned on him, effectively ending La Hermandad 187. On July 31 at Verano de Escándalo, Nicho attacked Líder during a Monster's Ball match and put him through a flaming table, costing him the match in the process. On August 19, 2011, Nicho attacked Líder again before putting on a Perros del Mal T-shirt, which led to the group's leader El Hijo del Perro Aguayo officially welcoming him to the group, turning rudo in the process. On October 9 at Héroes Inmortales, Los Perros del Mal and Los Psycho Circus ended their year-long rivalry, when Nicho, Damián 666 and Halloween were defeated in a Mask vs. Hair steel cage match, following interference from Joe Líder, and were all shaved bald.

In early 2012, Nicho started carrying his old Psicosis mask to the ring with him. On April 6, Nicho and Joe Líder interfered in each other's matches, with Líder burning Nicho's face with a fireball during a main event run-in. On May 6, Nicho returned to working under his old mask and the ring name Psicosis, continuing his rivalry with Líder. In storyline, Líder's fireball had not only severely burned Nicho's face, but the incident had also driven him insane, causing him to once again don a mask and refer to himself as Psicosis. On August 5 at Triplemanía XX, Psicosis reunited with Líder for one night to take part in a Parejas Suicidas steel cage match, featuring three other former tag teams. Líder lost the match, after being turned on by Psicosis, forcing the two to face other in a Hair vs. Hair match later in the event. In the end, Psicosis won the match, forcing his rival to have his head shaved bald.

On November 22, 2013, Psicosis, along with Perros del Mal stablemate Daga, turned on El Hijo del Perro Aguayo, labeling him a traitor for forming a new partnership with Cibernético, turning Nicho técnico in the process for the first time since 2011. However, on December 8 at Guerra de Titanes, Aguayo, Daga and Psicosis revealed they had played Cibernético, when Aguayo turned on him and brought Los Perros del Mal back under the umbrella of the reformed La Sociedad. On August 2, 2014, AAA announced that Castellanos was released from AAA.

=== Return to the independent circuit (2014–2015) ===
On August 15, 2014, La Familia de Tijuana (Damian 666, Extreme Tiger, Halloween and Nicho) against and lost to Chavo Guerrero Jr., Hernandez, Homicide and Luke Hawx in an 8-man tag team match at Zeus Promotions Debut Show. The follow week later on August 22, 2014, Nicho teamed with Fuerza Guerrera and King Azteca against and lost to LA Par-K, Mascara Sagrada and Octagon in a 6-man tag team match at Colossal. Four weeks later on September 26, 2014, Psicosis and Venom defeated Freesbe and La Abeja in a tag team match at BSW. The next day on September 27, 2014, Necro Butcher defeated Nicho and Joe Líder in a 3-way match at NGX. On October 12, Psicosis reunited with Juventud Guerrera in a losing effort to Hijo del Santo & Santo Jr. at the debut Lucha Ilimitado card in Yakima, Washington. On October 24, 2014, Arandu defeated Extreme Tiger, Nicho and TJ Boy in a fatal 4-way match at BSW. On July 24, 2015, Nicho defeated Pagano in a hair vs. hair match at live event.

=== Second return to AAA (2016–2017) ===
On March 23, 2016, at Rey de Reyes, Nicho returned to AAA for the first time in nearly two years, along with Los Fronterizos members Damián 666, Halloween and Pagano attacked Pentagón Jr., Taya, Khan, Líder and Daga, after Pentagón Jr. won the match. On June 5, 2016, at Worldwide en Orizaba, Nicho came down and costed Los Perros del Mal and allowed Los Psycho Circus to win. Nicho eliminating Ricky Marvin and El Hijo de Pirata Morgan, before Los Perros del Mal distracted him in the match and allowed Psycho Clown to win in a fatal 4-way elimination match.

== Personal life ==
On October 1, 2006, Castellanos married Anna Sabo; the couple have four children. The family divides their time between their homes in Tijuana, Baja California, Mexico, Manhattan, New York, and Los Angeles, California in the United States.

Castellanos was arrested on October 9, 2006, the night after he allegedly stole a car from a 23-year-old Alexander Valencia Ramirez of Rosarito Beach, Baja California. Mexican newspaper El Mexicano reported that Castellanos asked to borrow Ramirez's car, who refused, which resulted in Castellanos pulling a gun on him and stealing the car. During a chase with police, Castellanos hit several other vehicles. After apprehending him, police discovered that the gun that Castellanos had used earlier in the night was actually a water gun. As a result of this incident, his contract with the WWE was officially terminated.

On March 20, 2026, during a The Crash Lucha Libre event, Castellanos introduced his son, who adopted the ring name Millonario Jr.

== Championships and accomplishments ==
- All Pro Wrestling
  - APW Worldwide Internet Championship (1 time)
- Canadian Wrestling's Elite
  - CWE Tag Team Championship (1 time) - with Mentallo
- Cauliflower Alley Club
  - Lucha Libre Award (2026)
- Lucha Libre AAA World Wide
  - AAA World Tag Team Championship (1 time) – with Joe Líder
  - Mexican National Welterweight Championship (2 times)
  - AAA Hall of Fame (Class of 2024)
- Consejo Mundial de Lucha Libre
  - Mexican National Trios Championship (2 times) – with Fuerza Guerrera and Blue Panther (1 time), and Halloween and Damián 666 (1 time)
- International Wrestling Revolution Group
  - Guerra de Empresas (April 2011) – with Pimpinela Escarlata
- Latin American Wrestling Association
  - LAWA Welterweight Championship (1 time)
- Pro Wrestling Illustrated
  - PWI ranked him # 107 of the 500 best singles wrestlers during the PWI Years in 2003.
  - PWI ranked him # 39 of the 500 best singles wrestlers of the PWI 500 in 1996.
- World Championship Wrestling
  - WCW Cruiserweight Championship (2 times)
- World Pro Wrestling
  - WPW Cruiserweight Championship (1 time)
- World Wrestling All-Stars
  - WWA International Cruiserweight Championship (2 times)
- World Wrestling Association
  - WWA World Junior Light Heavyweight Championship (1 time)
  - WWA World Welterweight Championship (2 times)
  - WWA World Trios Championship (1 time) – with Juventud and Fuerza Guerrera
- Xtreme Latin American Wrestling
  - X–LAW Xtreme Heavyweight Championship (1 time)
- Other Titles
  - Tijuana Hardcore Championship (1 time)

== Luchas de Apuestas record ==
Winner (wager)	Loser (wager)	Location	Event	Date	Notes
Colibri (mask)	El Salvaje (hair)	Tijuana, Baja California	Live event	1991	(Note: This was a tag team match where El Salvaje was teamed with Caballero de la Muerte. It is not known who Colibri's partner was.)
Psicosis (mask)	Ultraman 2000 (mask)	Tijuana, Baja California	Live event	March 16, 1996	
Rey Misterio (mask)	Psicosis (mask)	Tijuana, Baja California	Live event	August 26, 1999	
Billy Kidman (hair)	Psicosis (mask)	Atlanta, Georgia	WCW Monday Nitro	September 27, 1999	(Note: Lost the same mask twice once in Mexico and once in the US.)
Nicho el Millonario (hair)	Rey Misterio (hair)	Tijuana, Baja California	Live event	May 12, 2000	
Nicho el Millonario (hair)	Fobia (hair)	Tijuana, Baja California	Live event	October 13, 2000	
Nicho el Millonario (hair)	Scorpio, Jr. (hair)	Tijuana, Baja California	Live event	December 22, 2000	
El Hijo del Santo (mask)	Nicho el Millonario (hair)	Tijuana, Baja California	Live event	April 6, 2001	
L.A. Park (mask)	Nicho el Millonario (hair)	Tijuana, Baja California	Live event	October 8, 2004	
Rey Misterio (hair)	Nicho el Millonario (hair)	Tijuana, Baja California	Live event	December 1, 2006	(Note: Steel cage match that also included El Hijo de Rey Misterio and Super Parka.)
Nicho el Millonario (hair)	Joe Líder (hair)	Tijuana, Baja California	Live event	August 15, 2010	(Note: Relevos suicidas match: lost to Principe Arandu and TJ Boy and had to wrestle each other.)
El Zorro (hair)	Nicho el Millonario (hair)	Ciudad Juárez, Chihuahua	Live event	October 30, 2010	(Note: Weapons match.)
Los Psycho Circus (masks) (Monster Clown, Murder Clown and Psycho Clown)	La Familia de Tijuana (hair) (Nicho el Millonario, Damián 666 and Halloween)	Monterrey, Nuevo León	Live event	October 9, 2011	(Note: Steel cage match, Masks vs. Hairs.)
Psicosis (hair)	Joe Líder (hair)	Mexico City	Triplemanía XX	August 5, 2012	(Note: Parejas suicidas steel cage match: lost to Chessman and Juventud Guerrera, Extreme Tiger and Halloween, and Jack Evans and Teddy Hart, and had to wrestle each other.)
Nicho el Millonario (hair)	Pagano (hair)	Tijuana, Baja California	Live event	July 24, 2015	
Daga (hair)	Nicho el Millonario (hair)	Tijuana, Baja California	The Crash show	June 23, 2017	(Note: Last two wrestlers in a steel cage match that also included Garza Jr. and Damián 666)

== See also ==
- The Latino World Order
- La Legión Extranjera
- The Mexicools
- Los Perros del Mal
- La Sociedad
