= X-Fly =

Mexican professional wrestler (born 1977)

Personal information
- Born: Juan Francisco Domínguez; September 8, 1977 (age 49) Guadalajara, Jalisco, Mexico

Professional wrestling career
- Ring name(s): Johnny; Juan el Mosco; Kumbia Kid Johnny; El Mosco; Mosco de la Merced (I); Mosco X-Fly; Pierroth Jr. Winners II; X-Fly
- Billed height: 1.68 m (5 ft 6 in)
- Billed weight: 82 kg (181 lb)
- Trained by: Skayde; Torero
- Debut: October 1995

Juan Francisco Domínguez (born September 8, 1977) is a Mexican professional wrestler, currently performing under the ring name X-Fly. He is also known as the original Mosco de la Merced ("Mosquito of Mercy"), a name which has since been given another professional wrestler. He is best known for his stints with the promotion Lucha Libre AAA Worldwide (AAA), the latest while representing Los Perros del Mal.

== Professional wrestling career ==
=== AAA (1995–1997) ===
Domínguez made his professional wrestling debut for AAA in October 1995 as the masked Mosco de la Merced ("Mosquito of Mercy"). After working random undercard matches for over a year, Mosco de la Merced was included in a new rudo (villainous) stable named Los Rudos de la Galaxia ("The Villains of the Galaxy"). The group, which also included Abismo Negro, Histeria, Maniaco and March-1, spent the first half of 1997 feuding with the Los Cadetes del Espacio ("Space Cadets") stable. Through AAA's working agreement with the World Wrestling Federation (WWF), the feud between the two stables was also featured on episodes of Monday Night Raw and Shotgun Saturday Night. On May 15, 1997, Mosco de la Merced and Fuerza Guerrera defeated Perro Aguayo and Perro Aguayo Jr. to win the Young Stars Tag Team Tournament and the vacant Mexican National Tag Team Championship. In August 1997, Cibernético took over the leadership of Los Rudos de la Galaxia and turned it into a new stable, Los Vipers. March-1 left the stable, while Electroshock, Psicosis II, Mini Abismo Negro, Mini Histeria and Mosquito de la Merced all joined the group. However, just two months later Domínguez left the promotion and the Mosco de la Merced character, and his Mexican National Tag Team Championship, were given to another performer.

=== Independent circuit (1997–present) ===
After his departure from AAA, Domínguez worked under various ring names and for multiple promotions in both Mexico and the United States, including WWF, World Championship Wrestling (WCW) and Extreme Championship Wrestling (ECW), where he spent three months in the summer of 1999, often working with Super Crazy, the former Histeria. On November 30, 1998, Domínguez, as Mosco de la Merced, lost his mask to Antifaz del Norte in a Lucha de Apuestas ("bet match"). Domínguez also made sporadic appearances for AAA in 2004 and 2007 as member of Los Kumbia Kids and La Hermandad Extrema, now working under the ring name X-Fly. Despite abandoning his old gimmick, Domínguez to this day often wears a Mosco de la Merced shirt during his matches and makes his entrances wearing his old mask. In December 2008, X-Fly found a new home in Perros del Mal Producciones, a new promotion founded by Perro Aguayo Jr., who often wrestles as El Hijo del Perro Aguayo. X-Fly was quickly made into a member of Los Perros del Mal, the main stable in the promotion, led by Aguayo. On February 20, 2010, X-Fly defeated Charly Manson to win the Mexican National Heavyweight Championship. On November 28, X-Fly and Bestia 666 defeated Trauma I and Trauma II to become the first Independent Wrestling League Tag Team Champions. On December 7, 2010, Perros del Mal Producciones crowned their first ever champion, when X-Fly defeated Bestia 666, Cósmico, Pesadilla, Ragde, Super Crazy, Tony Rivera, Turbo and Zumbi to become the first Perros del Mal Extremo Champion. On August 28, 2011, X-Fly, Bestia 666 and Damián 666 defeated Los Psycho Circus, Los Temerarios (Black Terry, Durok and Machin) and Los Villanos (Kortiz, Ray Mendoza Jr. and Villano IV) in a steel cage match to win International Wrestling Revolution Group's (IWRG) Intercontinental Trios Championship, making X-Fly a quintuple champion. On October 5, IWL announced that since X-Fly and Bestia 666 had defended the IWL Tag Team Championship without the promotion's authorization, they would no longer recognize the title, which would be replaced by the new IWL International Tag Team Championship. On December 1, X-Fly, Bestia and Damián lost the IWRG Intercontinental Trios Championship to Los Capos Jr. (Cien Caras Jr., El Hijo de Máscara Año 2000 and Máscara Año 2000 Jr.). On February 14, 2012, X-Fly lost the Mexican National Heavyweight Championship to Héctor Garza in a six-way elimination match, which also included El Hijo del Perro Aguayo, El Mesías, El Texano Jr. and Toscano.

After quitting Los Perros del Mal, X-Fly, Bestia 666, Damián 666 and Super Nova announced on March 13, 2012, that they were forming La Familia de Tijuana, a group of independent wrestlers, much like Los Perros del Mal, with the exception that they were not looking to form their own promotion. Upon leaving Perros del Mal Producciones, X-Fly vacated the promotion's Extremo Championship. On March 29, IWRG was officially announced as La Familia de Tijuana's new home promotion. On May 27, X-Fly and Damián 666 teamed with Headhunter I to defeat Los Capos Jr. and regain the IWRG Intercontinental Trios Championship. On June 17, the three were stripped of the title, after Damián 666 missed an IWRG event due to travel issues. On March 31, 2013, X-Fly and Eterno represented La Familia de Tijuana in IWRG's La Guerra de Familias ("War of the Families") tournament, losing to Los Traumas (Trauma I and Trauma II) in the first round. On June 23, X-Fly lost his hair to Dr. Cerebro in a steel cage Bull Terrier Lucha de Apuestas. On August 11, X-Fly and Eterno defeated Negro Navarro and Trauma I to win the IWRG Intercontinental Tag Team Championship. They lost the title to Los Traumas on September 1. On December 19, X-Fly teamed with Oficial 911 in a three-way elimination tag team Lucha de Apuestas. The match ended with Golden Magic pinning 911 for the win, forcing him to unmask and X-Fly to have his head shaved.

=== Return to AAA (2010–2012) ===
On June 6, 2010, X-Fly returned to AAA at the conclusion of Triplemanía XVIII, taking part in an angle, where the event was invaded by wrestlers from Perros del Mal Producciones, led by El Hijo del Perro Aguayo. Los Perros del Mal then came together with La Legión Extranjera to form La Sociedad. Under the banner of La Sociedad, X-Fly became one of the most featured members of Los Perros del Mal, alongside Aguayo, Damián 666 and Halloween. Los Perros del Mal then began feuding with the undefeated trio of Monster Clown, Murder Clown and Psycho Clown, known collectively as Los Psycho Circus. After several matches between the two groups went to either a countout or a no contest, Los Perros del Mal and Los Psycho Circus were booked to face each other in a steel cage weapons match on December 5 at Guerra de Titanes. In the match X-Fly replaced original participant El Hijo del Perro Aguayo, who was sidelined with a knee injury. The match took place in the main event of the evening and saw, X-Fly, Damián 666 and Halloween hand Los Psycho Circus their first ever loss, following outside interference from Aguayo. The feud between the two groups continued into 2011 and expanded to other promotions such Perros del Mal Producciones and IWRG. On June 18 at Triplemanía XIX, X-Fly again replaced Aguayo and teamed with Damián 666 and Halloween to defeat Los Psycho Circus and become the first ever AAA World Trios Champions. With the win, X-Fly became a quadruple champion. On July 31 at Verano de Escándalo, Los Perros del Mal faced Los Psycho Circus in a steel cage match, where the last person left in the cage would lose either his hair or mask. The match ended with Psycho Clown escaping the cage, leaving X-Fly inside and forcing him to have his hair shaved off. On March 11, 2012, Los Perros del Mal lost the AAA World Trios Championship to Los Psycho Circus. The following day, X-Fly, Damián 666 and Halloween announced that they had quit Los Perros del Mal.

== Personal life ==
Domínguez is a second-generation wrestler. He is the son of Araña Atómica and the father of El Hijo del Mosco.

== Championships and accomplishments ==
- AAA
  - AAA World Trios Championship (1 time) – with Damián 666 and Halloween
  - Mexican National Tag Team Championship (1 time) – with Fuerza Guerrera (Note: When Domínguez left AAA in September 1997, he was replaced in the championship team by Mosco de la Merced II, without the promotion ever acknowledging the switch.)
  - Young Stars Tag Team Tournament (1997) – with Fuerza Guerrera
- Independent/International Wrestling League
  - IWL Tag Team Championship (1 time) – with Bestia 666
- International Wrestling Revolution Group
  - IWRG Intercontinental Tag Team Championship (1 time) – with Eterno
  - IWRG Intercontinental Trios Championship (2 times) – with Bestia 666 and Damián 666 (1), and Damián 666 and Headhunter I (1)
  - Copa Pirata Moreno (2012)
  - Gran Cruzada (2015)
  - Guerra de Empresas (January 2011) – with Super Crazy
  - El Protector (2012) – with El Imposible
- Promociones Tragedias
  - Trios Supremos Tournament (2018) – with Toscano and Bam Bam
- Orden de Lucha Xtrema
  - OLX Hardcore Extreme Championship (1 time)
  - OLX Street Fight Championship (1 time)
- Perros del Mal Producciones
  - Perros del Mal Extremo Championship (1 time)
  - Mexican National Heavyweight Championship (1 time)
- Xtreme Latin American Wrestling
  - X–LAW Tag Team Championship (1 time) – with Depredador
- Xtrem Mexican Wrestling
  - XMW Championship (1 time)
- Atlanta World Wrestling Alliance
  - AWWA Welterweight Championship (1 time)

== Luchas de Apuestas record ==
Winner (wager)	Loser (wager)	Location	Event	Date	Notes
Super Kendo (mask)	Mosco de la Merced (hair)	Tijuana, Baja California	Live event	Unknown	
Antifaz del Norte (mask)	Mosco de la Merced (mask)	Nuevo Laredo, Tamaulipas	Live event	November 30, 1998	(Note: Steel cage match)
Pimpinela Escarlata (hair)	Mosco de la Merced (hair)	Nuevo Laredo, Tamaulipas	Live event	April 10, 1999	
Thunderbird (hair)	Mosco de la Merced (hair)	Tijuana, Baja California	Live event	May 12, 2000	(Note: Relevos suicidas match against Damián 666 and Halloween.)
Zumbido (hair)	Mosco de la Merced (hair)	Aguascalientes, Aguascalientes	Live event	July 6, 2001	
Negro Casas (hair) and Pentagon Black (mask)	Mosco de la Merced (hair)	Tijuana, Baja California	Live event	May 9, 2002	(Note: Six-man tag team match, where Casas and Black teamed with El Hijo del Santo against Merced, Super Kendo and Super Parka.)
Caifán Rockero I (hair)	Mosco de la Merced (hair)	Monterrey, Nuevo León	Live event	October 20, 2002	
Venum Black (hair)	X-Fly (hair)	Tijuana, Baja California	Live event	September 26, 2003	(Note: Relevos suicidas match against Príncipe Arandú and TJ Boy.)
Ari Romero Jr. (hair)	X-Fly (hair)	Ciudad Juárez, Chihuahua	Live event	May 23, 2004	
Damián 666 (hair)	X-Fly (hair)	Tijuana, Baja California	Live event	October 22, 2004	(Note: Relevos Australianos captain's fall match, where X-Fly teamed with Abismo Negro and Psicosis II against Damián 666, Halloween and Nicho el Millonario.)
La Máscara (mask)	Mosco de la Merced (hair)	Aguascalientes, Aguascalientes	Live event	August 4, 2005	(Note: Finals of a Ruleta de la Muerte.)
Super Crazy (hair)	X-Fly (hair)	Ciudad Madero, Tamaulipas	Live event	January 10, 2009	(Note: Relevos suicidas match against the teams of Damián 666 and Mr. Águila and Scorpio Jr. and Zumbido.)
Charly Manson (hair)	X-Fly (hair)	Tijuana, Baja California	Live event	May 1, 2010	
X-Fly (hair)	Zumbido (hair)	Tijuana, Baja California	Live event	September 19, 2010	
Psycho Clown (mask)	X-Fly (hair)	Guadalajara, Jalisco	Live event	July 31, 2011	(Note: Steel cage match, where Los Perros del Mal (X-Fly, Damián 666 and Halloween) faced Los Psycho Circus (Psycho Clown, Monster Clown and Murder Clown).)
Dr. Cerebro (hair)	X-Fly (hair)	Naucalpan, State of Mexico	Live event	June 23, 2013	(Note: Steel cage Bull Terrier match.)
Golden Magic (mask) and El Hijo de Pirata Morgan (hair)	Mosco X-Fly (hair) and Oficial 911 (mask)	Naucalpan, Mexico State	Arena Naucalpan 36th Anniversary Show	December 19, 2013	(Note: Elimination tag team match, also involving the team of Oficial Fierro and Trauma II.)
El Hijo de Pirata Morgan (hair)	Mosco X-Fly (hair)	Naucalpan, State of Mexico	IWRG show	May 25, 2014	(Note: Steel cage match, also involving Eterno and Hijo de Máscara Año 2000.)
Oficial AK-47 (hair)	Mosco X-Fly (hair)	Naucalpan, State of Mexico	IWRG show	December 21, 2014	(Note: Steel cage match, also involving Canis Lupus, Hijo de Máscara Año 2000, El Hijo de Pirata Morgan, Máscara Año 2000, Máscara Sagrada, Pirata Morgan, Rayo de Jalisco Jr. and Súper Nova.)
X-Fly (hair)	Eterno (hair)	Naucalpan, State of Mexico	IWRG show	April 19, 2015	(Note: Ruleta de la Muerte steel cage match, also involving Ricky Cruz and Veneno.)
Danny Casas (hair)	X-Fly (hair)	Naucalpan, State of Mexico	Ruleta de la Muerte	November 29, 2015	(Note: Ruleta de la Muerte steel cage match, also involving Diva Salvaje, Máscara Año 2000 Jr., Toscano, Trauma I, Trauma II and Veneno.)
Ovett (hair)	Mosca X-Fly (hair)	Naucalpan, State of Mexico	Cabellera vs. Cabellera	July 15, 2018	
