= Los Perros del Mal =

Professional wrestling stable

Los Perros Del Mal

Statistics
- Name(s): La Furia del Norte; Los Perros Del Mal; Los Perros del Mal de Japón
- Leader: Daga (II)
- Members: Angel; Berto; Karmen Petrovic
- Former members: See below
- Debut: 2004
- Years active: 2004–2015; 2017; 2019; 2021–2022; 2026–present

Los Perros Del Mal (English: The Dogs of Evil) is a Mexican professional wrestling stable currently performing in WWE's Mexican-based sister promotion Lucha Libre AAA Worldwide (AAA). The group currently consists of second leader Daga, Los Garza (Angel and Berto), and Karmen Petrovic. Daga, Angel, and Berto are the current AAA World Trios Champions in their first reign both, as a stable and individually.

The group's name is a play on the name of its founder and first leader, Perro Aguayo Jr. It was one of the main rudo (heel) stables in CMLL until October 2008, when Aguayo along with Mr. Águila and Damián 666 left the company to form the Perros del Mal Producciones (PdM) promotion. The stable performed in the new promotion, before expanding to AAA. The stable disbanded in 2015 after the death of Aguayo. The group has been reformed and reestablished multiple times in AAA and on the independent circuit, most recently in 2026 in AAA. The group originally started under the name La Furia del Norte (English: The Fury of the North) but evolved into Los Perros del Mal as wrestlers not from northern Mexico joined the group; the stable's motto is "Dios perdona, los Perros no" (English: God forgives, the Dogs don't). The group was immensely popular in Mexico and is credited in-part with starting the mid-2000s "Místico Boom Period" in Mexican wrestling. The group's signature t-shirt was a cultural and fashion phenomenon in Mexico, akin to the nWo or Austin 3:16 t-shirts during the 1990s wrestling boom in the United States. Los Perros del Mal inspired numerous stables in professional wrestling, including Los Perros del Mal de Japón in Japan's Pro Wrestling Noah promotion, Los Japonés del Mal, (Note: Also written as "Los Japoneses del Mal".) made up of Japanese expatriate professional wrestlers in Mexico, on the independent circuit, and La Rebelión in The Crash Lucha Libre.

== History ==
=== As La Furia del Norte ===
For the summer of 2004, the main storyline feud in Consejo Mundial de Lucha Libre (CMLL) was the heel trio of Pierroth Jr., Vampiro Canadiense and Tarzan Boy feuding with the técnico or face trio of Negro Casas, Shocker and Perro Aguayo Jr. The two factions finally faced off in a six-man cage match on July 18, 2004 where the last man in the cage got his head shaved. The rudos quickly escaped and Shocker tricked Casas and made his own escape, leaving Casas and Perro Aguayo Jr. Aguayo was victorious and Negro Casas, who had acted like a mentor for a time before this, had his head shaved leading to hostility.

The feud continued but soon Vampiro was injured in a match against the original Máscara Sagrada and was replaced by Héctor Garza, who had just jumped from Lucha Libre AAA Worldwide (AAA), in a trios match at Arena México. Over the next few weeks, Perro turned on Casas and joined Garza. Soon Tarzan Boy from Los Guerreros del Infierno joined with Perro explaining that he and Garza could only trust other northerners. From that comment the name La Furia del Norte (Spanish for "The Northern Fury") was born as they all hailed from northern Mexico. Tarzan Boy and Héctor Garza hailed from Monterrey, Nuevo León and Perro Aguayo Jr. claims his father's Zacatecas as his home state, although he was born in Mexico City. A few weeks later one last Northerner joined the group, El Terrible, who had just turned on Shocker. The group's cowardly and suave antics made them an entertaining combination and they quickly rivaled Los Guerreros as the top heel group in CMLL.

After losing a match for the CMLL 71st Anniversary Show trophy to Negro Casas, Perro moved onto a short but heated feud with El Hijo del Santo with La Furia playing back-up. Shortly afterwards, Garza, Terrible and Tarzan began chasing the CMLL World Trios Championship, eventually defeating Black Warrior, Rayo de Jalisco Jr. and El Canek in November. Perrito joined forces with his former rivals Pierroth and Vampiro in their feud against Los Capos, ending at the year-end show when Pierroth and Vampiro lost their hair to Cien Caras and Máscara Año 2000 and Perro lost to Universo 2000 via disqualification in a singles match. The group's future was put in question when Garza was arrested in the United States with illegal steroids.

=== As Los Perros del Mal ===
==== Consejo Mundial de Lucha Libre ====
Perro still continued to feud with Los Capos and he used La Furia against them up until the big Perro Aguayo and Perro Aguayo Jr. versus Cien Caras and Máscara Año 2000 double hair match in March of that year. After Aguayo and his father were successful, Aguayo decided to start a new group consisting of La Furia del Norte, La Familia de Tijuana and other rudos called Los Perros del Mal. After the formation of Los Perros, the name "La Furia del Norte" referred only to the trio of Tarzan Boy, Terrible and Garza.

Latin Lover appeared as a member at Arena Mexico with Garza and Perro Jr. He wore the Perros del Mal shirt, and though it was only an appearance, was considered a member of the stable.

==== AAA invasion ====
On June 6, 2010, at AAA's biggest event of the year, Triplemanía XVIII, Los Perros del Mal started an invasion storyline with the promotion. While many Perros del Mal Producciones workers have since made appearances in AAA, Perro Aguayo Jr., Damián 666, Halloween and L.A. Park are the four main members representing the stable in the company. Los Perros del Mal quickly aligned themselves with other rudo stables La Legión Extranjera, La Milicia and Los Maniacos to form La Sociedad, under the leadership of Dorian Roldan. On December 5, 2010, in the main event of Guerra de Titanes Dámian 666, Halloween and X-Fly achieved a major feat by ending Los Psycho Circus's three-year-long undefeated streak in a steel cage weapons match, albeit after an interference from Perro Aguayo Jr. The feud between Los Perros del Mal and Los Psycho Circus continued on May 29 at Perros del Mal Producciones third anniversary show, where Los Psycho Circus was victorious in a six-man tag team steel cage Masks vs. Hairs match and, as a result, Super Crazy, the last man left in the cage, was forced to have his head shaved bald. On June 18 at Triplemanía XIX, Damián 666, Halloween and X-Fly defeated Los Psycho Circus in a tournament final to become the first ever AAA World Trios Champions. On July 31 at Verano de Escándalo, Los Perros del Mal faced Los Psycho Circus in a steel cage match, where the last person left in the cage would lose either his hair or mask. The match ended with Psycho Clown escaping the cage, leaving X-Fly inside and forcing him to have his hair shaved off. Los Perros del Mal and Los Psycho Circus ended their year long rivalry on October 9 at Héroes Inmortales, where Damián 666, Halloween and Nicho el Millonario were defeated in a Masks vs. Hairs steel cage match and were all shaved bald. On November 11, 2011, former member and reigning CMLL World Heavyweight Champion Héctor Garza jumped from CMLL to Perros del Mal Producciones to re-join the group. Shortly afterwards, El Texano Jr. also left CMLL and joined Los Perros del Mal, along with his brother Super Nova, though this partnership was short-lived as El Texano Jr. went on to form rival group, El Consejo. On March 11, 2012, Los Perros del Mal lost the AAA World Trios Championship to Los Psycho Circus. The following day, Damián 666, his son Bestia 666, Halloween and X-Fly announced that they had quit Los Perros del Mal. Halloween ended up returning to the group the following month, while the other vacant spots were filled by Taya Valkyrie, Teddy Hart, Trauma I and Trauma II. In mid-2013, El Hijo del Perro Aguayo began showing signs of a técnico turn by forming a new partnership with former rival Cibernético, which eventually led to Los Perros del Mal members Daga and Psicosis turning on their leader on November 22. Aguayo quickly announced that Daga and Psicosis' betrayal would not mark the end of Los Perros del Mal and that he would soon introduce a new incarnation of the stable. However, on December 8 at Guerra de Titanes, Aguayo, Daga and Psicosis revealed they had played Cibernético, when Aguayo turned on him and brought Los Perros del Mal back under the umbrella of the reformed La Sociedad. On February 21, 2014, longtime CMLL wrestler Black Warrior made a surprise return to AAA as the newest member of Los Perros del Mal. Daga left Los Perros del Mal on April 19 to lead the Anarquía stable.

On March 21, 2015, Aguayo died following a freak accident during a wrestling match, throwing the stable's future into question. While Pentagón Jr. and Taya continued representing Los Perros del Mal in AAA events following Aguayo's death, Joe Líder stated that the group's future was still uncertain. In January 2017, Daga, Garza Jr. and Pentagón Jr. all quit AAA and made an appearance for The Crash promotion, wearing Los Perros del Mal gear. Daga and Pentagón Jr. had hopes they would be able to continue using the name Los Perros del Mal on the independent circuit with Garza Jr. as a new member, but on January 24 they instead announced they were leaving the group.

==== Pro Wrestling Noah ====
On June 27, 2021, at Pro Wrestling Noah (Noah)'s Muta The World event, Nosawa Rongai unveiled a new stable named Los Perros del Mal de Japón, as a tribute to the Mexican stable Los Perros del Mal after Eita, Rongai and Yo-Hey defeated Stinger (Yoshinari Ogawa, Seiki Yoshioka and Yuya Susumu). A brawl began between the two stables with Kotaro Suzuki and Ikuto Hidaka coming to help them, outnumbering and overwhelming Stinger. Rongai later revealed that relatives of Perro Aguayo Jr., the founder of the Los Perros del Mal, had granted him permission to use the stable's name.

At Grand Square 2021 in Osaka, Eita and Rongai defeated Atsushi Kotoge and Hajime Ohara to win the GHC Junior Heavyweight Tag Team Championship. On March 13 at Great Voyage in Yokohama, Eita defeated Daisuke Harada to win the GHC Junior Heavyweight Championship, meaning that Los Perros del Mal de Japon had conquered both of Pro Wrestling Noah's junior heavyweight championships.

On November 23, 2022, Rongai decided to disband the stable, ahead of his retirement match which was scheduled to place on February 21, 2023.

==== Revival in AAA ====
On the June 20, 2026 episode of WWE Lucha Libre AAA, Los Perros del Mal was revived in Lucha Libre AAA Worldwide (AAA), now a subsidiary of WWE, with returning member Daga and new members Berto, Angel, Bronco Nima, and Karmen Petrovic. All members came to the ring and attacked El Grande Americano. On the August 15, 2026 episode of WWE Lucha Libre AAA, Daga invited Penta to join the group due to their shared history as members of the group. Later that night, Bronco Nima challenged Penta to a match for the following week with the stipulation being that if Nima won, Penta would have to rejoin the group. On the August 22, 2026 episode of WWE Lucha Libre AAA, Penta defeated Nima. After the match, Nima was kicked out of the group after an attack by the rest of Los Perros Del Mal. On September 11, 2026 at Triplemanía in Las Vegas, NV, Los Perros Del Mal successfully defeated Los Psycho Circus to win the AAA World Trios Championship.

== Members ==
I-II	Leader(s)

=== Current ===
Member		Joined
Daga	(II)	June 20, 2026
Angel		June 20, 2026
Berto		June 20, 2026
Karmen Petrovic		June 20, 2026

=== Former ===
- El Hijo del Perro Aguayo/Perro Aguayo Jr. (I)
- Averno
- Bestia 666
- Black Warrior
- Blue Demon Jr.
- Booker T
- Bronco Nima
- Cibernético
- Cuije
- Damián 666
- Doctor X-Treme
- Douki
- Eita
- Ek Balam
- El Alebrije
- El Hijo de L.A. Park
- El Hijo del Fantasma
- El Oriental
- El Terrible
- El Texano Jr.
- Ephesto
- Estrellita
- Fénix
- Halloween
- Hanaoka
- Héctor Garza
- Ikuto Hidaka
- Ivelisse Vélez
- Joe Líder
- Johnny Mundo
- Kahn del Mal
- Konnan
- Kotaro Suzuki
- L.A. Park
- La Parka Negra
- Latin Lover
- Lizmark Jr.
- Manik
- Mephisto
- Mr. Águila
- Nosawa Rongai
- Olímpico
- Pentagón Jr.
- Pequeño Damián 666
- Pequeño Halloween
- Pesadilla
- Pete Powers
- Picudo
- Pierroth Jr.
- Psicosis/Nicho el Millonario
- Radge
- Ricky Marvin
- Shocker
- Super Crazy
- Súper Nova
- Tarzan Boy
- Taya
- Teddy Hart
- Trauma I
- Trauma II
- X-Fly
- Yo-Hey

== Sub-groups ==
Affiliate	Members	Tenure	Promotion	Type
Los Traumas	Trauma I Trauma II	2012–2013	PdM	Tag team
Los Perros del Mal de Japón	Eita; El Texano Jr. Ikuto Hidaka; Kotaro Suzuki; Nosawa Rongai; Super Crazy; Yo-Hey	2021–2022	Noah	Stable
Los Garza	Angel; Berto	2026–present	AAA; WWE	Tag team

== Championships and accomplishments ==
- Consejo Mundial de Lucha Libre

- CMLL World Trios Championship (2 times) – Héctor Garza, El Terrible and Tarzan Boy (1), Perro Aguayo Jr., Mr. Águila and Héctor Garza (1)
- Mexican National Trios Championship (1 time) – Damián 666, Halloween and Mr. Águila
- Occidente Tag Team Championship (1 time) – El Texano Jr. and El Terrible

- Dragon Gate
  - Open the Triangle Gate Championship (2 times) – Eita, Kotaro Suzuki and Nosawa Rongai
- Independent/International Wrestling League

- IWL Tag Team Championship (1 time) – Bestia 666 and X-Fly

- International Wrestling Revolution Group

- IWRG Intercontinental Trios Championship (1 time) – Bestia 666, Damián 666 and X-Fly

- Lucha Libre AAA Worldwide

- AAA Cruiserweight Championship (1 time) – Daga
- AAA Reina de Reinas Championship (1 time) – Taya
- AAA World Tag Team Championship (1 time) – Joe Líder and Pentagón Jr.
- AAA World Trios Championship (2 times, current) – Damián 666, Halloween and X-Fly (1), Daga, Angel and Berto (1, current)
- Copa Triplemanía XXII (2014) – El Hijo del Perro Aguayo
- Rey de Reyes (2012) – El Hijo del Perro Aguayo
- Rey de Reyes (2016) – Pentagón Jr.

- Perros del Mal Producciones

- Perros del Mal Extremo Championship (1 time) – X-Fly
- Mexican National Heavyweight Championship (2 times) – X-Fly (1) and Héctor Garza (1)
- Copa Perros del Mal Extremo (2011) – Halloween

- Pro Wrestling Noah
  - GHC Junior Heavyweight Championship (1 time) – Eita
  - GHC Junior Heavyweight Tag Team Championship (1 time) – Eita and Nosawa Rongai
- Producciones Sánchez

- Trofeo Arena Neza (2016) – Joe Líder, Kahn del Mal and Pentagon Jr.

== Luchas de Apuestas record ==
Winner (wager)	Loser (wager)	Location	Event	Date	Notes
Psycho Clown (hair)	Super Crazy (hair)	Mexico City	Perros del Mal Aniversario	May 29, 2011	(Note: Six man tag team steel cage Masks vs. Hairs match, where Los Perros del Mal (Crazy, El Hijo del Perro Aguayo and Damián 666) faced Los Psycho Circus (Psycho Clown, Monster Clown and Murder Clown).)
Halloween (hair)	Coco Rojo (hair)	Tlalnepantla de Baz, Mexico State	Live event	July 10, 2011	(Note: Steel cage match, where Los Perros del Mal (Halloween, Damián 666 and Ek Balam) faced Los Payasos Tricolor (Coco Rojo, Coco Azul and Coco Amarillo) and Los Psycho Circus (Monster Clown, Murder Clown and Psycho Clown).)
Psycho Clown (mask)	X-Fly (hair)	Guadalajara, Jalisco	Live event	July 31, 2011	(Note: Six man tag team steel cage Masks vs. Hairs match, where Los Perros del Mal (X-Fly, Damián 666 and Halloween) faced Los Psycho Circus.)
Damián 666 (hair)	Monster Clown (Trios Championship)	Naucalpan, Mexico State	IWRG Live event	August 28, 2011	(Note: Four tag team steel cage match, where Los Psycho Circus put their IWRG Intercontinental Trios Championship on the line against the hairs/masks of Los Perros del Mal (Damián 666, Bestia 666 and X-Fly), Los Temerarios (Black Terry, Durok and Machin) and Los Villanos (Kortiz, Ray Mendoza Jr. and Villano IV).)
Los Psycho Circus (masks) (Monster Clown, Murder Clown and Psycho Clown)	Los Perros del Mal (hair) (Halloween, Damián 666 and Nicho el Millonario)	Monterrey, Nuevo León	Live event	October 9, 2011	(Note: Steel cage match Masks vs. Hair match.)
Psicosis (hair)	Joe Líder (hair)	Mexico City	Triplemanía XX	August 5, 2012	
Dark Cuervo (hair)	Halloween (hair)	San Luis Potosí, San Luis Potosí	Héroes Inmortales IV	October 7, 2012	(Note: Domo de la Muerte, where Los Perros del Mal (Halloween, El Hijo del Perro Aguayo, Psicosis and Teddy Hart) faced Dark Cuervo, Cibernético, Dark Ozz and Jack Evans.)
