= Perros del Mal (promotion) =

Mexican professional wrestling promotion

- Acronym: PdM
- Founded: December 7, 2008
- Defunct: 2015
- Style: Lucha Libre
- Headquarters: Mexico
- Founder: Perro Aguayo, Jr.
- Owner: Perro Aguayo, Jr.
- Split from: Consejo Mundial de Lucha Libre

Perros del Mal Producciones (Spanish for "Evil Dogs Productions"), often referred to simply as Perros del Mal (PdM), was a Mexican professional wrestling promotion founded in October 2007 by Perro Aguayo, Jr. when he left Consejo Mundial de Lucha Libre and became inactive around 2015. The promotion shared a name with Aguayo, Jr.'s wrestling stable (group) Los Perros del Mal and the stable is the main Rudo (villain) group in the promotion. The promotion had an "open door policy" which meant they did not generally have wrestlers under contract but hired them on a per appearance basis. Perros del Mal was also a booking agency, responsible for hiring the core Perros del Mal group and others to various independent promotions all over Mexico.

== History ==
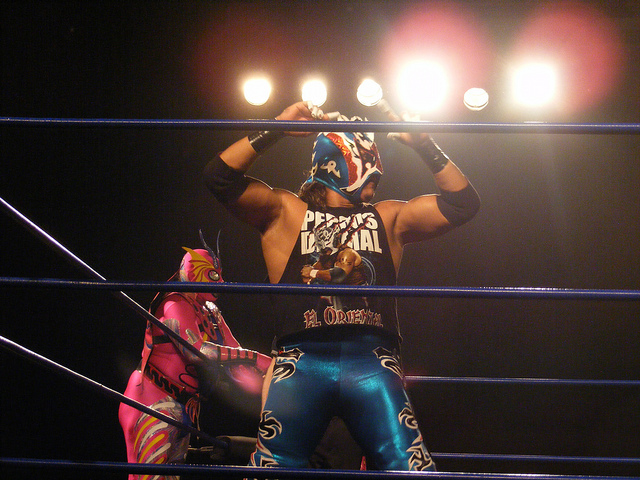
Team Perros del Mal in Chikara: El Oriental and El Alebrije representing the promotion .

Originally the plan was for Perro Aguayo, Jr. to leave Consejo Mundial de Lucha Libre (CMLL) to set up the Perros del Mal promotion, using both CMLL wrestlers and independent wrestlers on his shows, working select dates for CMLL after the promotion was established. After Aguayo, Jr. and CMLL had a falling out in late 2008, Aguayo, Jr. and most of his Los Perros del Mal group left CMLL. Along with Aguayo, Jr. Mr. Águila and Damián 666 left CMLL and started a promotion that was completely independent of CMLL. CMLL ran counter programming for their debut show as well as later shows, trying to impede the success of Perros del Mal.

Since its inception Perros del Mal has seen a host of independent wrestlers work for them, including wrestlers such as Olímpico who had left CMLL. They also saw a number of wrestlers who had left Asistencia Asesoría y Administración (AAA) come work for them. Since Perros del Mal do not sign wrestles to full-time contracts they sometimes suffer when one of the wrestlers they built their storylines around sign with either CMLL or AAA, such as the case of Dr. Wagner, Jr. signing with AAA, Cibernético returning to AAA and more recently L.A. Park's decision to work for AAA again. The promotion sent El Alebrije, Cuije and El Oriental to compete as "Team Perros del Mal" in Chikara's 2010 King of Trios tournament. Since the beginning of 2010 there had been rumors and reports that Los Perros del Mal were going to work together with AAA, with the Los Perros del Mal group acting as an "invading force", but nothing came of those early rumors. In early June Dorian Roldan, executive in AAA announced that Los Perros del Mal would be appearing at Triplemanía XVIII on June 6, 2010, AAA's largest event of the year. This appearance started a storyline, where the Perros del Mal group, led by Perro Aguayo, Jr., invaded AAA and aligned themselves with Roldan's and Konnan's La Legión Extranjera, La Milicia and Los Maniacos to form La Sociedad. The promotion held its third anniversary show on May 29, 2011, which was headlined by a six-man tag team steel cage Masks vs. Hairs match, where Los Psycho Circus (Monster Clown, Murder Clown and Psycho Clown) defeated Los Perros del Mal (Aguayo, Damián 666 and Super Crazy) and, as a result, Crazy, the last man left in the cage, was forced to have his head shaved bald. On March 13, 2012, Bestia 666, Damián 666, Halloween, Super Nova and X-Fly all quit Perros del Mal Producciones and formed their own independent group, La Familia de Tijuana. Halloween ended up returning to Los Perros del Mal the following month.

=== First show ===
The Perros del Mal promotion held its first show on Sunday, December 7, 2008, in Mexico City, Mexico at the Sala de Armas de Ciudad Deportiva ("Municipal Sports Armory"). CMLL decided to run a stacked show on the same day in Arena México, not far from the Perros del Mal event as a "counter-programming" measure. The show featured a mixture of wrestlers from the Mexican independent circuit as well as Super Crazy who had left the World Wrestling Entertainment (WWE) not long before the event and Cibernético who walked out on Asistencia Asesoría y Administración (AAA) a few weeks before the show.

No.	Results	Stipulations
1	Dr. Markus and Gran Markus, Jr. (Note: This was not the original Gran Markus, Jr.) defeated Bugambilia and Metal Boy	Tag team match
2	Esther Moreno and Martha Villalobos defeated Ayako Hamada and Rossy Moreno	Tag team match
3	Black Spirit, Super Nova, and Turbo defeated Black Thunder, Cerebro Negro, and X-Fly	Six-man tag team match
4	El Intocable, Rayman, and Super Crazy defeated Damián 666, Headhunter B, and Mr. Águila	Six-man tag team match
5	Cibernético, Dr. Wagner, Jr., and Perro Aguayo, Jr. defeated Headhunter A, LA Park, and Olímpico by disqualification	Six-man tag team match

== Roster ==
The Perros del Mal promotion did not have a number of wrestlers under full-time contracts, but instead employed an "open door" policy allowing them to book a variety of wrestlers on the independent circuit. The company did use a number of wrestlers on a regular basis. The core of the promotion was the Los Perros del Mal stable who in part founded the promotion.

From September 2010, the promotion began using wrestlers from AAA on shows as a part of their working relationship.

Listed below are some of the wrestlers who have worked recent Perros del Mal shows.

Regulars

Ring name	Notes
El Ángel	
Black Warrior	
Celestial	Perros del Mal Mini Champion Mini-Estrella
Cosmico	Mini-Estrella
Diva Salvaje	Exotico
El Texano, Jr.	
Halloween	Los Perros del Mal
Héctor Garza	Los Perros del Mal
El Hijo de Dr. Wagner, Jr.	Worked previously as Riveiro
El Hijo de L.A. Park	Worked previously as Black Spirit
El Hijo de Lizmark	
El Hijo de Rey Misterio	
Konami	
LA Park	
La Medussa	
Mini Talisman	Mini-Estrella
Mr. Águilita	Mini-Estrella
Pesadilla	
Pequeño Halloween	Mini-Estrella
Radge	
Super Crazy	Los Perros del Mal
TJP	
Trauma I	Los Perros del Mal
Trauma II	Los Perros del Mal

Notable alumni

Ring name	Notes
Annie Social	
Ayako Hamada	
Bestia 666	
Black Thunder	
Blue Demon Jr.	
Booker T	
Brazo de Plata	
Cassandro	Exotico
Cerebro Negro	
Cibernético	
C. Manson	
Damián 666	
Dr. Wagner, Jr.	
Gran Alebrije	
Estrellita	
The Headhunters	
Hijo del Pirata Morgan	
El Hijo del Santo	Todo X Todos representative
Hysteria Extreme	
Hombre Bala	Monsther
El Intocable	
Groon XXX	
Juventud Guerrera	
Latin Lover	
Marco Corleone	
Mascarita Dorada	Mini-Estrella
Mascarita Sagrada	
Mosco de la Merced	
Mr. Águila	
Olímpico	
El Oriental	
Pirata Morgan, Jr.	
Piratita Morgan	Mini-Estrella
Psycosis Extreme	
Rayman	
Scorpio, Jr.	
Shelly Martinez	
Super Nova	
Supreme	
Tinieblas, Jr.	
Tony Rivera	
Turbo	
Veneno	
Villano III	
Villano IV	
Villano V	
Violento Jack	Perros del Mal Extremo Champion
X-Fly	
Zumbido	

== Championships ==
The Perros del Mal promotion presented a "Perros del Mal championship" belt at the 2009 Lucha Libre Expo in July 2009, but made no announcement regarding the belt for over a year. Finally, on December 7, 2010, Perros del Mal crowned the first ever Perros del Mal Extremo Champion. Just like with their policy on wrestlers Perros del Mal also has an open policy on championships, if a wrestler holds a title they will recognize it and allow him or her to wear it, they will even promote title matches. Listed below are the championships that have been defended in the Los Perros del Mal promotion so far.

Championship	Current champion	Date won	Previous Champion
Perros del Mal Extremo Championship	Joe Líder	May 22, 2015	Principe Escorpion
Perros del Mal Light Heavyweight Championship	Pentagon Jr.	July 17, 2016	Fenix
Perros del Mal Mini Championship	Celestial	November 13, 2011	Mr. Águilita
Mexican National Heavyweight Championship	Héctor Garza	February 14, 2012	X-Fly

== See also ==
- List of professional wrestling promotions in Mexico
