= Joe Líder =

Mexican professional wrestler

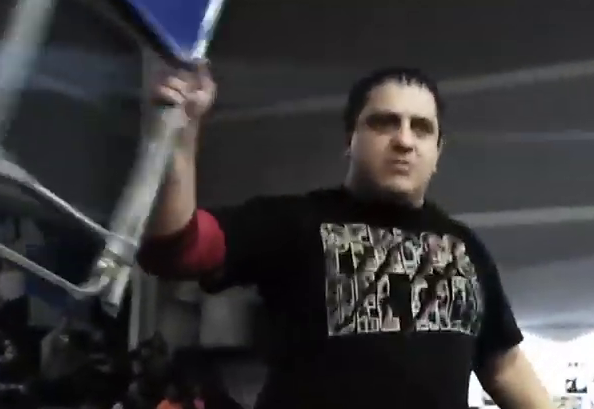

Personal information
- Born: José de Jesús Álvarez Gutierrez; June 2, 1978 (age 48) Guadalajara, Jalisco, Mexico

Professional wrestling career
- Ring name(s): Joe Líder; Blue Flash; Power Boy
- Billed height: 5 ft 9 in (1.75 m)
- Billed weight: 178 lb (81 kg)
- Trained by: Aullido; Javier Mariscal
- Debut: December 8, 1993

José de Jesús Álvarez Gutierrez (born June 2, 1978) is a Mexican professional wrestler, better known by his ringname Joe Líder. He currently competes on the Lucha Libre AAA Worldwide (AAA). He is known for being a former member of the tag team La Hermandad Extrema with Nicho el Millonario who, like himself, is one of several wrestlers to emerge from the independent circuit during the 1990s. Álvarez is also the real-life brother of Demoledor and had faced him on several occasions during his career, most notably, defeating him in their hometown in a "hair vs. hair" match at the Arena Victoria in January 2005.

== Professional wrestling career ==
In one of his first matches with The Mexican Powers, he and Crazy Boy teamed with Juventud Guerrera and Psicosis II in an 8-man tag team match to defeat Chessman, Escoria, Cuervo and Ozz at the Verano de Escandalo (2006) on September 17, 2006. Three months later at Guerra de Titanes 2006, Líder was pinned by Escoria in a match with Crazy Boy and Psicosis against Escoria, Cuervo and Ozz.

He also took part in a 4-team elimination match to determine the first AAA World Tag Team Championship at Rey de Reyes (2007) but lost out to Cuervo and Ozz when Líder was pinned by Ozz in the final fall. The other participants were Alan Stone and Zumbido and Pegasso and Super Fly.

On July 15, 2007, he and Crazy Boy won the AAA World Tag Team Championship from Cuervo and Ozz in a ladder match at Triplemania XV. At the first annual 2007 Antonio Peña Memorial Show, he and the Mexipowers lost to Extreme Tiger, Halloween and Nicho el Millonario.

At Verano de Escandalo (2007), Líder was pinned by Mr. Niebla in an 8-man tag team match pitting The Mexican Powers (Líder, Crazy Boy, Extreme Tiger and Juventud Guerrera) against Antifaz del Norte, Histeria, Mr. Niebla and Psicosis. Líder and Crazy Boy later defended their titles in an "extreme four-way dance" against Charly Manson and Chessman, Extreme Tiger and Halloween and Teddy Hart and Sabu at Guerra de Titanes 2007 on November 20, 2007. At Rey de Reyes (2008), Líder was involved in a 6-man ladder match involving Chessman, Teddy Hart, Halloween, Juventud Guerrera and Extreme Tiger who won the match.

He later regained the AAA World Tag Team titles with Nicho el Millonario, calling themselves La Hermandad Extrema (later renamed La Hermandad 187), at Verano de Escandalo (2008) in a "four-way" ladder match between Crazy Boy and Último Gladiador, Extreme Tiger and Halloween, and Jack Evans and Teddy Hart. They successfully defended the titles against Alan and Chris Stone and Jack Evans and Teddy Hart in a "three-way" ladder match at the 2008 Antonio Peña Memorial Show. They also faced Jack Evans and Teddy Hart at Guerra de Titanes 2008 fighting them to a double-countout. At the 2009 Rey de Reyes, Líder was eliminated in the opening rounds by Alan Stone. This was a 4-man elimination match that also included Elegido and Silver King. La Hermandad 187 are the longest reigning tag team champions, with a reign of 551 days. On March 19, 2010, they lost the championship to La Legión Extranjera representatives Taiji Ishimori and Takeshi Morishima. On June 6, 2010, at Triplemania XVIII, La Hermandad 187 participated in a 4-Way elimination match for the AAA World Tag Team Championship. Líder eliminated the then reigning AAA World Tag Team Champions (Atsushi Aoki and Go Shiozaki) when he pinned Shiozaki. later on Líder was pinned by James Storm of Beer Money, Inc. after interference from Konnan, denying them the chance to regain the tag team championship. Later in the night La Hermandad helped Cibernético beat up almost all the members of La Legión. Afterwards La Hermandad started feuding with La Sociedad, a superstable consisting of invaders from Los Perros del Mal and members of Los Maniacos, La Legión Extrangera and La Milicia, El Zorro and Hernandez in particular. La Hermandad received their rematch for the AAA World Tag Team Championship from Los Maniacos (Silver King and Último Gladiador) on September 19, 2010, but Lider was forced to enter the match without Nicho, who was taken out by El Zorro, Hernandez and La Legión the previous week, and was unable to regain the championship. At Héroes Inmortales IV Nicho and Lider gained a measure of revenge on Konnan by defeating him and Perros del Mal members Damián 666 and Halloween in a three–on–two handicap hardcore match. On December 5 at Guerra de Titanes Líder and Nicho received a shot at the AAA World Tag Team Championship, but were unable to dethrone Los Maniacos in a three-way ladder match, which also included Hernandez and El Ilegal. On June 18 at Triplemanía XIX, Líder, Electroshock and Heavy Metal defeated Silver King, Último Gladiador and Chessman in a Tables, Ladders and Chairs match. During the match, Nicho tried entered the ring and tried to exact revenge on La Maniarquía for injuring him, but was stopped and suspended by AAA president Joaquín Roldan. Nicho returned to AAA on July 16, threatening Roldan, which led to Líder trying to calm his partner down. This in turn led to Nicho declaring that if Líder was with Roldan, they were no longer friends. Later in the event, Nicho interfered in Líder's match and turned on him, effectively ending La Hermandad 187. On July 31 at Verano de Escándalo, Nicho attacked Líder during a Monster's Ball match and put him through a flaming table, costing him the match in the process. In early 2012, Líder reunited with the returning Juventud Guerrera as the Mexican Powers. On May 6, Líder and Guerrera challenged Abyss and Chessman for the AAA World Tag Team Championship, but were defeated following interference from Nicho, now working as Psicosis and wearing his old mask, supposedly to cover his face burned by Líder. On August 5 at Triplemanía XX, Líder reunited with Psicosis for one night to take part in a Parejas Suicidas steel cage match, featuring three other former tag teams. Líder lost the match, after being turned on by Psicosis, forcing the two to face other in a Hair vs. Hair match later in the event. In the end, the match was won by Psicosis, forcing Líder to have his head shaved bald.

On September 7, 2014, Líder turned on Argenis and Jack Evans and joined the Los Perros del Mal stable. On December 7, Líder and Perros del Mal's newest member Pentagón Jr. won the AAA World Tag Team Championship. They held the title until October 4, 2015.

== Championships and accomplishments ==
- Lucha Libre AAA Worldwide
  - AAA World Tag Team Championship (5 times) – with Crazy Boy (2), Nicho el Millonario (1), Vampiro (1), and Pentagón Jr. (1)
  - Mexican National Atomicos Championship (1 time) – with Psicosis II, Crazy Boy and Juventud Guerrera
  - Copa Hijo del Perro Aguayo (2017)
- Desastre Total Ultraviolento
  - DTU Extreme Championship (2 times)
- International Wrestling Revolution Group

- IWRG Intercontinental Trios Championship (1 time) – with Silver King and Último Gladiador

- New Wrestling Generation
  - NWG Extreme Championship (3 times)
- Kings Bull Wrestling
  - KBW Extremo Championship (1 time)
- Perros del Mal Producciones
  - Perros del Mal Extremo Championship (1 time)
- Pro Wrestling Illustrated
  - PWI ranked him #149 of the top 500 singles wrestlers in the PWI 500 in 2010
- Producciones Sánchez
  - Trofeo Arena Neza Tournament (2016) - with Kahn del Mal & Pentagon Jr
- Xtreme Latin American Wrestling
  - XLAW Junior Heavyweight Championship (3 times)
- Other Championships
  - Distrito Jalisco Middleweight Championship (1 time)
  - Distrito Jalisco Heavyweight Championship (1 time)
  - Tonala Absolute Championship (1 time)

== Luchas de Apuestas record ==
Winner (wager)	Loser (wager)	Location	Event	Date	Notes
Joe Líder (hair)	Pokarito Jr. (hair)	Guadalajara, Jalisco	Live event	N/A	
Arlequín	Joe Líder (hair)	Guadalajara, Jalisco	Live event	N/A	
Joe Líder (hair)	Shiryu Dragon (hair)	Guadalajara, Jalisco	Live event	April 27, 2003	
Joe Líder (hair)	Demoledor (hair)	Guadalajara, Jalisco	Live event	N/A	
Joe Líder (hair)	Shiryu Dragon (hair)	Guadalajara, Jalisco	Live event	2004	
Extreme Tiger (mask)	Joe Líder (hair)	Tijuana, Baja California	Live event	November 12, 2004	
Joe Líder (hair)	Demoledor (hair)	Guadalajara, Jalisco	Live event	January 2005	
Joe Líder (hair)	Principe Arandu (hair)	Tijuana, Baja California	Live event	September 9, 2005	
Nicho el Millonario (hair)	Joe Líder (hair)	Tijuana, Baja California	Live event	August 15, 2010	(Note: Relevos suicidas match: lost to Principe Arandu and TJ Boy and had to wrestle each other.)
"Pierroth Jr." (mask)	Joe Líder (hair)	Torreón, Coahuila	Live event	December 25, 2010	
Joe Líder (hair)	Super Mega (hair)	Tlalnepantla de Baz, Mexico State	Live event	May 26, 2012	(Note: Steel cage match)
Psicosis (hair)	Joe Líder (hair)	Mexico City	Triplemanía XX	August 5, 2012	(Note: At Triplemanía XX. Parejas suicidas steel cage match: lost to Chessman and Juventud Guerrera, Extreme Tiger and Halloween, and Jack Evans and Teddy Hart, and had to wrestle each other.)
Joe Líder (hair)	Kaientai (mask)	Monterrey, Nuevo León	Live event	December 1, 2012	(Note: At Nuega Generación Extrema's X Anniversary Show.)
Joe Líder (hair)	Último Gladiador (hair)	Naucalpan, Mexico State	Live event	September 16, 2013	(Note: Three-way elimination hardcore match, which also included Daga.)
Joe Líder (hair)	Ángel o Demonio (hair)	Xalapa, Veracruz	Live event	November 9, 2013	
Joe Líder (hair)	Reptilius (hair)	Madero, Tamaulipas	Live event	February 28, 2015	
Pagano (hair)	Joe Líder (hair)	Ciudad Nezahualcóyotl, State of Mexico	Live event	January 1, 2017	(Note: Last two wrestlers in a steel cage match that also included Hijo de Pirata Morgan, El Texano Jr., Averno and Chessman)
Chessman (hair)	Joe Lider (hair)	Nezahualcoyotl, Mexico	Arena Neza show	January 1, 2020	(Note: The last two men in a nine-man steel cage match that also included Pagano, Texano Jr., Mr. Águila, Máximo, Mocho Cota Jr., Carta Brava Jr., and Averno)
