= List of The Crash Lucha Libre shows =

Professional wrestling shows by The Crash Lucha Libre

The Mexican Lucha libre, or professional wrestling promotion The Crash Lucha Libre (The Crash) has produced and scripted a number of wrestling shows since their creation in November 2011.. Some of these shows have become annual events, some are special one-off events, normally indicated by a special main event match or being promoted under a special name, and some are The Crash's normally promoted shows. Many of the annual and special events are headlined by a Lucha de Apuestas, or "bet match", where a wrestler will put his wrestling mask or hair on the line. The group holds their Anniversary show each year in November and will on occasion co-promote a show with other promotions such as Major League Wrestling, Fight Club: Pro or Revolucha. The majority of the shows are held in Tijuana, Baja California, Mexico at the Auditorio Fausto Gutierrez.

== The Crash Lucha Libre shows ==
Event	Date	City	Venue	Main event
The Crash (debut)	November 4, 2011	Tijuana, Baja California	Auditorio Fausto Gutierrez	El Hijo del Santo and Latin Lover vs. El Hijo del Solitario and Marco Corleone
The Crash I	February 15, 2012	Ensenada, Baja California	Auditorio Tigre Garcia	Blue Demon Jr. and Rayo de Jalisco Jr. vs. Cien Caras Jr. and Héctor Garza
The Crash II	February 17, 2012	Tijuana, Baja California	Auditorio Fausto Gutierrez	Blue Demon Jr. and Rayo de Jalisco Jr. vs. Cien Caras Jr. and Héctor Garza
The Crash III	May 25, 2012	Tijuana, Baja California	Auditorio Fausto Gutierrez	Los Perros del Mal (Héctor Garza and Perro Aguayo Jr.) vs. Carlito and Steve Pain
The Crash IV	September 28, 2012	Tijuana, Baja California	Auditorio Fausto Gutierrez	Ángel Metalico, Blue Demon Jr. and L.A. Park vs. Electroshock, Héctor Garza and Tony Casanova
The Crash V	February 15, 2013	Tijuana, Baja California	Auditorio Fausto Gutierrez	Los Psycho Circus (Monster Clown, Murder Clown and Psycho Clown) vs. Chessman, Texano Jr. and Tony Casanova
The Crash VI	April 12, 2013	Tijuana, Baja California	Auditorio Fausto Gutierrez	Texano Jr. and La Parka Negra vs. La Parka and Ricky Marvin
The Crash VII	June 14, 2013	Tijuana, Baja California	Auditorio Fausto Gutierrez	Cibernético vs. Perro Aguayo Jr. in a Bull Terrier Match
The Crash VIII	October 11, 2013	Tijuana, Baja California	Auditorio Fausto Gutierrez	Los Infierno Rockers (Devil Rocker, Machine Rocker and Soul Rocker) vs. Los Psycho Circus (Monster Clown, Murder Clown and Psycho Clown)
The Crash IX	January 31, 2014	Tijuana, Baja California	Auditorio Fausto Gutierrez	Angélico and Psycho Clown vs. El Consejo (El Hijo del Fantasma and Texano Jr.)
The Crash X	July 18, 2014	Tijuana, Baja California	Auditorio Fausto Gutierrez	Ángel Metalico and Sin Cara vs. La Nueva Sociedad (Averno and El Hijo del Fantasma)
The Crash show	March 20, 2015	Tijuana, Baja California	Auditorio Fausto Gutierrez	Extreme Tiger and Rey Mysterio Jr. vs. Manik and Perro Aguayo Jr.
The Crash show	May 8, 2015	Tijuana, Baja California	Auditorio Fausto Gutierrez	Angélico, Blue Demon Jr. and Psycho Clown vs. Brian Cage, El Mesias and Texano Jr.
The Crash show	July 3, 2015	Tijuana, Baja California	Auditorio Fausto Gutierrez	La Parka and Psycho Clown vs. El Zorro and La Parka Negra
The Crash show	August 7, 2015	Heroica Puebla de Zaragoza, Puebla	Gimnasio Miguel Hidalgo	Fénix, La Parka and Rey Mysterio Jr. vs. Daga, El Hijo del Fantasma and Pentagón Jr.
The Crash show	September 18, 2015	Heroica Puebla de Zaragoza, Puebla	Heroica Guaymas de Zaragoza, Sonora	Los Psycho Circus (Monster Clown, Murder Clown and Psycho Clown) vs. Cibernético, Machine Rocker and Mr. Maldito
The Crash show	October 2, 2015	Tijuana, Baja California	Auditorio Fausto Gutierrez	El Patron Alberto, Rey Horus and Rey Mysterio Jr. vs. Daga, El Hijo del Fantasma and Extreme Tiger
The Crash show	February 12, 2016	Tijuana, Baja California	Auditorio Fausto Gutierrez	John Morrison, Pentagón Jr. and Teddy Hart vs. Blue Demon Jr., Fénix and Rey Horus
The Crash show	August 13, 2016	Tijuana, Baja California	Auditorio Fausto Gutierrez	El Hijo del Santo and El Santo Jr. vs. Ángel Blanco Jr. and Rayman
The Crash show	September 24, 2016	Tijuana, Baja California	Auditorio Fausto Gutierrez	Alberto El Patron and Jeff Cobb vs. La Máscara and Rush
The Crash V Aniversario	November 26, 2016	Tijuana, Baja California	Auditorio Fausto Gutierrez	Jeff Hardy, Rey Fénix and Rey Mysterio Jr. vs. Jeff Cobb, Nicho el Millonario and Teddy Hart
The Crash show	January 21, 2017	Tijuana, Baja California	Auditorio Fausto Gutierrez	Jeff Hardy and Matt Hardy vs. Juventud Guerrera and Super Crazy for the vacant The Crash Tag Team Championship
The Crash show	February 25, 2017	Tijuana, Baja California	Auditorio Fausto Gutierrez	Masada and Nicho el Millonario vs. Aeroboy and Violento Jack in a tag team no canvas death match
The Crash show	March 25, 2017	Tijuana, Baja California	Auditorio Fausto Gutierrez	The Young Bucks (Matt Jackson and Nick Jackson) vs. Daga and Rey Mysterio Jr.
The Crash show	April 5, 2017	Mexico City, Distrito Federal	Gimnasio Olímpico Juan de la Barrera	Penta El Zero M, Rey Fénix and Rey Mysterio Jr. vs. Cody Rhodes, Katsuhiko Nakajima and Sami Callihan
The Crash show	May 5, 2017	Mexico City, Distrito Federal	Gimnasio Olímpico Juan de la Barrera	Penta El Zero M and Rey Fénix vs. The Young Bucks (Matt Jackson and Nick Jackson)
The Crash show	June 2, 2017	Tijuana, Baja California	Auditorio Fausto Gutierrez	Daga, Garza Jr. and Rey Mysterio Jr. vs. La Familia de Tijuana (Damián 666, Nicho el Millonario) and Mr. Águila)
The Crash show	June 23, 2017	Tijuana, Baja California	Auditorio Fausto Gutierrez	Daga and Garza Jr. and Damián 666 vs. Nicho el Millonario in a lucha de Apuestas steel cage match
The Crash show	July 2, 2017	Oaxaca de Juarez, Oaxaca	Estadio Eduardo Vasconcelos	Penta El Zero M, Rey Fénix and Rey Mysterio vs. La Máscara, Máximo and Rey Escorpión
The Crash/Revolucha show	July 9, 2017	Monterrey, Nuevo Leon	Arena Coliseo Monterrey	Garza Jr. and Penta El Zero M vs. La Máscara and Máximo
The Crash show	July 14, 2017	Tijuana, Baja California	Auditorio Fausto Gutierrez	Penta El Zero M vs. Jeff Cobb and Marty Scurll and La Máscara
The Crash show	August 4, 2017	Mexcali, Baja California	Palenque del FEX	Penta El Zero M and Rey Mysterio Jr. vs. Brian Cage and Carlito
The Crash show	August 5, 2017	Tijuana, Baja California	Auditorio Fausto Gutierrez	La Máscara vs. Penta El Zero M in a Super Libre match
The Crash/Revolucha show	August 6, 2017	Monterrey, Nuevo Leon	Arena Coliseo Monterrey	Daga vs. Garza Jr.
The Crash show	August 10, 2017	San Luis Potosi	Domo de San Luis Potosí	Blue Demon Jr., Rey Fénix and Rey Mysterio Jr. vs. La Máscara, Máximo and Rey Escorpión
The Crash show	September 2, 2017	Tijuana, Baja California	Auditorio Fausto Gutierrez	Black Danger vs. Oraculo Lucha de Apuestas, mask vs. mask match
The Crash show	September 13, 2017	San Luis Potosi	Domo de San Luis Potosí	Daga and Penta El Zero M vs. Los Ingobernables (Pierroth and Rush) and Bestia 666 and Garza Jr. and La Máscara and Máximo
The Crash show	October 5, 2017	Tijuana, Baja California	Auditorio Fausto Gutierrez	Brian Cage, Penta El Zero M and Rey Mysterio vs. Los Ingobernables (La Máscara, Pierroth and Rush)
The Crash show	October 9, 2017	Nuevo Laredo, Tamaulipas	"Parque de Beisbol La Junta"	Daga and Penta El Zero M vs. Garza Jr. and La Máscara
The Crash show	November 3, 2017	Guadalajara, Jalisco	Plaza de Toros Nuevo Progreso	Blue Demon Jr., Penta El Zero M and Rey Mysterio Jr. vs. Carlito, Garza Jr. and La Máscara
The Crash VI Aniversario	November 4, 2017	Tijuana, Baja California	Auditorio Fausto Gutierrez	Bestia 666 vs. Jack Evans in a Lucha de Apuestas, hair vs. hair match
The Crash/Revolucha show	November 5, 2017	Monterrey, Nuevo Leon	Arena Coliseo Monterrey	Los Ingobernables (La Máscara, Pierroth and Rush) vs. The Lucha Brothers (Penta El Zero M and Rey Fénix) and Rey Mysterio
The Crash show	November 6, 2017	Nuevo Laredo, Tamaulipas	Poliforum La Fe	Brian Cage, Daga and Rey Mysterio Jr. vs. Los Ingobernables (La Máscara, Pierroth and Rush)
The Crash show	November 7, 2017	Santiago de Queretaro, Queretaro	Arena Queretaro	Carlito, Máximo and Penta El Zero M vs. Los Ingobernables (La Máscara, Pierroth and Rush)
The Crash show	November 8, 2017	Aguascalientes, Aguascalientes	Palenque de la Feria	Penta El Zero M and Rey Mysterio Jr. vs. Los Ingobernables (La Bestia Del Ring and Rush) and La Rebelión Amarilla (Bestia 666 and Black Taurus)
The Crash show	November 11, 2017	Naucalpan, Estado de Mexico	Arena Naucalpan	Penta El Zero M vs. Garza Jr. vs. La Máscara
The Crash/G21	November 13, 2017	Salamanca, Guanajuato	Gimnasio 400 Deportiva Su	Bestia 666 and Garza Jr. vs. Los Ingobernables (La Máscara and Rush) vs. The Lucha Brothers (Penta El Zero M and Rey Fénix)
The Crash/DTU	November 29, 2017	San Luis Potosi	Auditorio Miguel Barragan	Los Ingobernables (La Máscara, Pierroth and Rush) vs. Daga, LA Park and Penta El Zero M
The Crash/DTU	November 30, 2017	Pachuca, Hidalgo	Arena Aficion	Penta El Zero M vs. La Máscara vs. Garza Jr. vs. Rush
The Crash show	December 1, 2017	Tijuana, Baja California	Auditorio Fausto Gutierrez	Los Ingobernables (La Máscara and Rush) vs. Bestia 666 and Garza Jr. and L.A. Park and Nicho el Millonario
The Crash show	December 3, 2017	Ecatepec, Estado de Mexico	Centro Civico Nueva Aragon	L.A. Park, Penta El Zero M and Rey Mysterio Jr. vs. Carlito, Garza Jr. and La Máscara
The Crash show	December 15, 2017	Ciudad Nezahualcoyotl, Estado de Mexico	Arena Neza	Blue Demon Jr., Máximo and Penta El Zero M vs. Bestia 666, Garza Jr. and Heavy Metal
The Crash show	December 25, 2017	Ecatepec, Estado de Mexico	Centro Civico Nueva Aragon	Rey Fénix vs. Penta El Zero M
The Crash show	January 14, 2018	Tulancingo, Hidalgo	Palenque de la Feria	Daga, Jack Evans, L.A. Park and Rey Mysterio vs. La Rebelión Amarilla (Bestia 666, Black Taurus, Garza Jr. and Mecha Wolf 450)
The Crash show	January 20, 2018	Tijuana, Baja California	Auditorio Fausto Gutierrez	Daga, Masada and Penta El Zero M vs. La Rebelión Amarilla (Bestia 666, Garza Jr. and Mecha Wolf 450)
The Crash show	January 26, 2018	Ecatepec, Estado de Mexico	Salon Citlalli	Daga, Máximo and Penta El Zero M vs. Bestia 666, Damián 666 and La Máscara
The Crash show	February 16, 2018	Tijuana, Baja California	Auditorio Fausto Gutierrez	CIMA, Extreme Tiger and Rey Horus vs. The Lucha Brothers (Penta El Zero M and Rey Fénix) and Rey Mysterio Jr.
The Crash show	March 17, 2018	Tijuana, Baja California	Auditorio Fausto Gutierrez	Carístico vs. Bestia 666
The Crash WrestleCon	April 6, 2018	New Orleans, Louisiana, USA	Sugar Mill	Austin Aries vs. Penta El Zero M
The Crash show	April 14, 2018	Tijuana, Baja California	Auditorio Fausto Gutierrez	L.A. Park vs. Rey Fénix
The Crash show	April 15, 2018	Mexicali, Baja California	Palenque del FEX	Damián 666, L.A. Park and Penta El Zero M vs. La Rebelión Amarilla (Bestia 666, Black Taurus and Luke Hawx)
The Crash/Prodduciones Aoza show	May 18, 2018	Saltillo, Coahuila	Lienzo Charro Prof Enrique Gonzalez	Rey Mysterio (c) vs. Bestia 666 vs. Penta El Zero M The Crash Heavyweight Championship match
The Crash show	May 19, 2018	Tijuana, Baja California	Auditorio Fausto Gutierrez	Carístico vs. Penta El Zero M
The Crash show	June 16, 2018	Tijuana, Baja California	Auditorio Fausto Gutierrez	La Rebelión Amarilla (Bestia 666 and Garza Jr.) and Rush vs. Alberto El Patron, Penta El Zero M and Rey Mysterio
The Crash show	June 30, 2018	Tlaxcala, Tlaxcala	"Palenque de Tlaxcala"	The Lucha Brothers (Penta El Zero M and Rey Fénix) vs. La Rebelión Amarilla (Bestia 666 and Mecha Wolf 450) and Los Ingobernables (La Máscara, Pierroth and Rush)
The Crash show	July 14, 2018	Tijuana, Baja California	Auditorio Fausto Gutierrez	Penta El Zero M vs. Bestia 666 in a steel cage match
The Crash show	June 17, 2018	Ecatepec, Estado de Mexico	Centro de Alto Rendimento The Crash	Daga, El Mesias and Penta El Zero M vs. Hantar, Kronoz and Savage
The Crash show	August 3, 2018	Tijuana, Baja California	Auditorio Fausto Gutierrez	Pete Dunne vs. Daga and Dragon Lee
The Crash show	September 8, 2018	Tijuana, Baja California	Auditorio Fausto Gutierrez	Carístico and Volador Jr. vs. Daga and Penta El Zero M
The Crash show	September 21, 2018	Tijuana, Baja California	Auditorio Fausto Gutierrez	Gilbert El Boricua vs. Mecha Wolf 450
The Crash show	October 6, 2018	Tijuana, Baja California	Auditorio Fausto Gutierrez	Bandido and Flamita vs. The Briscoe Brothers (Jay Briscoe and Mark Briscoe)
The Crash VII Aniversario	November 3, 2018	Tijuana, Baja California	Auditorio Fausto Gutierrez	Bestia 666 vs. Garza Jr. in a Lucha de Apuestas, hair vs. hair match
The Crash show	December 1, 2018	Tijuana, Baja California	Auditorio Fausto Gutierrez	La Rebelión Amarilla (Bestia 666 and Mecha Wolf 450) vs. Nuevo Generaction Dinamitas (El Cuatrero and Sansón)
The Crash show	January 19, 2019	Tijuana, Baja California	Auditorio Fausto Gutierrez	Rey Horus, Último Dragón and X-Peria vs. La Rebelión Amarilla (Bestia 666, Garza Jr. and Mecha Wolf 450)
The Crash show	January 27, 2019	Ecatepec, Estado de Mexico	Centro de Alto Rendimento The Crash	El Hijo de L.A. Park and L.A. Park vs. The Lucha Brothers (Penta El Zero M and Rey Fénix) and Cibernético and Rush
The Crash show	February 9, 2019	Tijuana, Baja California	Auditorio Fausto Gutierrez	Damián 666 vs. Bestia 666 in a steel cage match
The Crash show	March 2, 2019	Tijuana, Baja California	Auditorio Fausto Gutierrez	Austin Theory vs. Willie Mack (c) vs. Sansón vs Bárbaro Cavernario
The Crash show	March 23, 2019	Tijuana, Baja California	Auditorio Fausto Gutierrez	Dragon Lee vs. Rey Horus
The Crash show	March 31, 2019	Ecatepec, Estado de Mexico	Centro de Alto Rendimento The Crash	Arez, Dragon Lee and Místico vs. Drako, Hantar and Ricky Marvin
The Crash show	April 13, 2019	Tijuana, Baja California	Auditorio Fausto Gutierrez	La Rebelión Amarilla (Bestia 666 and Mecha Wolf 450) and El Hijo del Fantasma vs. Nuevo Generaction Dinamitas (El Cuatrero, Forastero and Sansón)
The Crash show	May 4, 2019	Tijuana, Baja California	Auditorio Fausto Gutierrez	The Lucha Brothers (Penta El Zero M and Rey Fénix) (c) vs. MexaBlood (Bandido and Flamita)
The Crash show	May 24, 2019	Tijuana, Baja California	Auditorio Fausto Gutierrez	La Rebelión Amarilla (Bestia 666 and Mecha Wolf 450) vs. The Lucha Brothers (Penta El Zero M and Rey Fénix) (c) for The Crash Tag Team Championship
The Crash show	June 15, 2019	Tijuana, Baja California	Auditorio Fausto Gutierrez	Bandido vs. Adam Brooks and Dragon Lee and Matt Taven
The Crash show	July 5, 2019	Tijuana, Baja California	Auditorio Fausto Gutierrez	El Hijo de L.A. Park and L.A. Park vs. La Rebelión Amarilla (Bestia 666 and Mecha Wolf 450)
The Crash	July 13, 2019	Tlaxcala, Tlaxcala	Palenque del Centro Expositor Adolfo Lopez Mateos	Ángel de Oro, Carístico and Niebla Roja vs. La Rebelión Amarilla (Bestia 666 and Mecha Wolf 450) and El Hijo del Fantasma
The Crash/FCP show	September 7, 2019	Tijuana, Baja California	Auditorio Fausto Gutierrez	Moustache Mountain (Trent Seven and Tyler Bate) and Travis Banks vs. La Rebelión Amarilla (Bestia 666, Mecha Wolf 450 and Rey Horus)
The Crash/MLW show	October 5, 2019	Tijuana, Baja California	Auditorio Fausto Gutierrez	La Rebelión Amarilla (Bestia 666 and Mecha Wolf 450) and L.A. Park vs. Contra Unit (Ikuro Kwon, Josef Samael and Simon Gotch)
The Crash VIII Aniversario	November 1, 2019	Tijuana, Baja California	Auditorio Fausto Gutierrez	The Lucha Brothers (Penta El Zero M and Rey Fénix) vs. Dragon Lee and Rush El Toro Blanco
