= The Crash X Aniversario =

Major Mexican professional wrestling show

- Promotion: The Crash Lucha Libre
- Date: November 5, 2021
- City: Tijuana, Baja California, Mexico
- Venue: Auditorio Fausto Gutierrez

Event chronology
← Previous; The Crash VIII Aniversario	Next → MLW Azteca/The Crash show

The Crash Aniversario chronology
← Previous; VIII	Next → —

The Crash X Aniversario, also known as The Crash Decimo Aniversario (Spanish for The Crash 10th Anniversary Show), was a professional wrestling supercard event, scripted and produced by the Mexican lucha libre promotion The Crash Lucha Libre, which took place on November 5, 2021 at Auditorio Fausto Gutierrez in The Crash's home town of Tijuana, Baja California. It was the fifth event under The Crash Aniversario chronology. The event commemorated the creation of The Crash Lucha Libre in November 2011 and is their biggest show of the year.

== Production ==
=== Background ===
The Crash Lucha Libre began operating on 2011, focusing mainly on promotion professional wrestling event in Tijuana, Baja California, Mexico. Their first show was held on November 4, 2011 with a main event of El Hijo del Santo and Latin Lover defeating El Hijo del Solitario and Marco Corleone. The Crash held shows on a limited schedule over the next couple of years; 4 in 2012, 4 in 2013, 2 in 2014, and 5 in 2015.

The group held The Crash V Aniversario show on November 26, 2016, the first time they billed one of their shows as a direct celebration of their anniversary. They continued the tradition in 2017 (The Crash VI Aniversario) and 2018 (The Crash VII Aniversario).

=== Storylines ===
The Crash X Aniversario show featured six professional wrestling matches scripted by The Crash with some wrestlers involved in scripted feuds. The wrestlers portray either heels (referred to as rudos in Mexico, those that play the part of the "bad guys") or faces (técnicos in Mexico, the "good guy" characters) as they perform in the ring.

== Results ==
No.	Results	Stipulations
1	Toto defeated Terror Azteca, Proximo, Kamika-C, Skalibur, and Dinámico (c)	Six-way match for the vacant The Crash Junior Championship
2	Destiny and Rey Horus defeated Torito Negro & Demonic Flamita	Tag team match for The Crash Women's Championship
3	Dinámico defeated Oraculo (c) and Black Danger	Three-way match for The Crash Cruiserweight Championship
4	La Rebelión Amarilla (Mecha Wolf 450 and Bestia 666) defeated Las Traumas (Trauma I and Trauma II) (c), Los Mercenarios (Black Taurus and Rey Escorpión), and Funny Bone and Super Beast	Four-way tag team match for The Crash Tag Team Championship
5	Negro Navarro defeated El Solar	Three-way match for The Crash Heavyweight Championship
6	Pagano defeated Masada	Hardcore match
(c) / – the champion(s) heading into the match
