= The Crash VIII Aniversario =

Major Mexican professional wrestling show

- Promotion: The Crash Lucha Libre
- Date: November 1, 2019
- City: Tijuana, Baja California, Mexico
- Venue: Auditorio Fausto Gutierrez
- Attendance: 5,000 (sold out)

Event chronology
← Previous; The Crash/MLW show	Next → The Crash X Aniversario

The Crash Aniversario chronology
← Previous; VII	Next → X

The Crash VIII Aniversario, also known as The Crash Octavio Aniversario (Spanish for The Crash 8th Anniversary Show), was a professional wrestling supercard event, scripted and produced by the Mexican lucha libre promotion The Crash Lucha Libre, which took place on November 1, 2019 at Auditorio Fausto Gutierrez in The Crash's home town of Tijuana, Baja California. The event commemorated the creation of The Crash Lucha Libre in November 2011 and is their biggest show of the year.

The main event of the show featured the Muñoz brothers (Dragon Lee and Rush El Toro Blanco) versus Los Lucha Bros (Penta El 0M and Rey Fénix), four of the most prolific and in-demand wrestlers on the Mexican independent circuit. Los Lucha Bros won the match when the Muñoz brothers were disqualified. In the semi-main event Triple Amenaza ("Triple Threat"; Star Boy, Viento, and Zarco) defeated Los Haraganes (Animal, Demencia, and Silver Star) in a Lucha de Apuestas match, which meant all of Los Haraganes were forced to unmask. In the opening match Terror Azteca won The Crash Junior Championship and in the middle of the show Oraculo won The Crash Cruiserweight Championship. Additionally, Lady Flamer successfully defended The Crash Women's Championship, Rey Horus retained The Crash Heavyweight Championship and La Rebelión Amarilla (Mecha Wolf 450 and Bestia 666) remained The Crash Tag Team Championship

== Production ==
=== Background ===
The Crash Lucha Libre began operating on 2011, focusing mainly on promotion professional wrestling event in Tijuana, Baja California, Mexico. Their first show was held on November 4, 2011 with a main event of El Hijo del Santo and Latin Lover defeating El Hijo del Solitario and Marco Corleone. The Crash held shows on a limited schedule over the next couple of years; 4 in 2012, 4 in 2013, 2 in 2014, and 5 in 2015.

The group held The Crash V Aniversario show on November 26, 2016, the first time they billed one of their shows as a direct celebration of their anniversary. They continued the tradition in 2017 (The Crash VI Aniversario) and 2018 (The Crash VII Aniversario).

=== Storylines ===
The Crash VIII Aniversario show featured eight professional wrestling matches scripted by The Crash with some wrestlers involved in scripted feuds. The wrestlers portray either heels (referred to as rudos in Mexico, those that play the part of the "bad guys") or faces (técnicos in Mexico, the "good guy" characters) as they perform in the ring.

Tiago won The Crash Junior Championship on May 24, 2019 when he defeated Xperia and Torito Negro to become champion. When The Crash began to announce matches for their Aniversario show, they announced that The Crash Junior Championship had been vacated, but did not give any specifics around why it was vacated. Instead they announced a Tables, Ladders, and Chairs match between Toto, Próximo, Baby Xtreme, Soldado del Invierno, and Terror Azteca for the championship.

The Crash also announced a number of championship matches with no major storylines leading to each match, often featuring non-Mexican wrestlers who only appear in Mexico for special occasions. For the show Rey Horus was announced as defending The Crash Heavyweight Championship against Jeff Cobb and Cima. Then-champion Jonathan Gresham would be defending The Crash Cruiserweight Championship against Oráculo, Black Danger, and Dinámico. The company also announced that Lady Flamer would defend The Crash Women's Championship against Christina Von Eerie in Von Eerie's first match for the company.

The only championship match announced for the show that featured a storyline was the feud between The Crash-mainstay, and champions, La Rebelión Amarilla ("The Yellow Rebellion"; Mecha Wolf 450 and Bestia 666) and independent circuit regulars Las Traumas (Trauma I and Trauma II) who had been fighting over the previous The Crash Shows.

While championship matches are often the headliner matches for major shows in professional wrestling outside of Mexico, the Lucha de Apuestas, or "bet matches", are generally promoted as more prestigious than championship matches in Mexico. The Crash announced a three-on-three Lucha de Apuestas match as part of their The Crash VIII Aniversario show, where all three members of a team would lose their mask or hair if they lost. The long building feud pitted Los Haraganes ("The Lazy Ones"; Animal, Demencia, and Silver Star - all masked) against Triple Amenaza ("Triple Threat") Arandu, Star Boy, and Zarco). Two out of the three members of Triple Amenaza were unmasked, which mean two of the men risked their hair. Since Arandu was already bald, Triple Amenaza "bet" the hair of their corner man Peluche instead should the team lose.

== Results ==
No.	Results	Stipulations
1	Terror Azteca defeated Baby Xtreme, Ovett Jr., Proxima, and Soldado del Invierno	Tables, Ladders, and Chairs match for the vacant The Crash Junior Championship
2	Lady Flamer (c) defeated Christina Von Eerie	Singles match for The Crash Women's Championship
3	Oráculo defeated Jonathan Gresham (c), Black Danger, and Dinámico	Four-way match for The Crash Cruiserweight Championship
4	Negro Navarro defeated El Solar	Singles match
5	La Rebelión Amarilla (Mecha Wolf 450 and Bestia 666) (c) defeated Las Traumas (Trauma I and Trauma II)	Tag team match for The Crash Tag Team Championship
6	Rey Horus (c) defeated Jeff Cobb and CIMA	Three-way match for The Crash Heavyweight Championship
7	Triple Amenaza (Star Boy, Viento, and Zarco) defeated Los Haraganes (Animal, Demencia, and Silver Star)	Lucha de Apuestas, Masks vs. Masks and Hair match
8	Los Lucha Bros (Penta El 0M and Rey Fénix) defeated Los Hermanos Muñoz (Dragon Lee and Rush El Toro Blanco) by disqualification	"Lucha Libre rules" Tag team match
(c) / – the champion(s) heading into the match
