= The Crash/Major League Wrestling show =

Mexican professional wrestling show

The Crash/Major League Wrestling Show
- Official promotional poster for the event
- Promotions: The Crash Lucha Libre; Major League Wrestling
- Date: October 5, 2019 (aired October 12, October 19, October 26, 2019)
- City: Tijuana, Baja California, Mexico
- Venue: Auditorio Fausto Gutierrez
- Attendance: 5,000 (approx.)

Event chronology
← Previous
- The Crash/FCP show (Crash)
- War Chamber (MLW)
Next →
- The Crash VIII Aniversario (Crash)
- Saturday Night SuperFight (MLW)

MLW/The Crash chronology
← Previous; First	Next → 2021

The Crash/Major League Wrestling Show was a professional wrestling supercard event co-produced by the U.S-based Major League Wrestling (MLW) and Mexico-based The Crash Lucha Libre (Crash) held in The Crash's home arena, Auditorio Fausto Gutierrez in Tijuana, Baja California, Mexico. The show was taped for episodes of MLW Fusion that aired from October 12 to 26, 2019 on BeIN Sports USA

The main event of the show was a continuation of the MLW storyline feud between L.A. Park and "Contra Unit" (Jacob Fatu, Ikuro Kwon, Josef Samael, and Simon Gotch) that was building to MLW's Saturday Night SuperFight pay-per-view on November 2, 2019. In the main event L.A. Park teamed up with The Crash main-stays La Rebelión Amarilla (Bestia 666 and Mecha Wolf 450) to defeat Kwon, Samael and Gotch. On the undercard The Crash Heavyweight Champion Rey Horus faced the MLW National Openweight Champion Alexander Hammerstone in a match where both championships were on the line. The match ended in a disqualification, with both men keeping their championships. The show featured seven additional matches.

The show was originally supposed to include matches with four Consejo Mundial de Lucha Libre (CMLL) wrestlers, but CMLL pulled their workers from the show when The Crash insisted on booking Dragon Lee, who had been fired from CMLL in the days leading up to the show. In addition to CMLL workers Soberano Jr., Barbaro Cavernario, Ángel de Oro, and Niebla Roja, several of the originally scheduled matches had to be changes as Jacob Fatu, Minoru Tanaka, Mance Warner, Teddy Hart, Marshall Von Erich, and Ross Von Erich ended up not working the show.

== Production ==
=== Background ===
On August 8, 2019 Major League Wrestling (MLW) announced that they had formed an alliance with the Mexican based The Crash Lucha Libre professional wrestling promotion and as part of that alliance they would co-promote a show in Mexico. The show would tape matches for 3 episodes of their MLW Fusion show.

The originally announced card for the show also included wrestlers from Consejo Mundial de Lucha Libre (CMLL); Dragon Lee, Soberano Jr., Barbaro Cavernario, Ángel de Oro, and Niebla Roja. The matches including CMLL wrestlers were not scheduled to be aired on Fusion. On September 27, CMLL announced that they had fired Dragon Lee, followed by CMLL removing the remaining CMLL wrestlers from the joint Crash/MLW show as they kept Dragon Lee on the card afterwards.

MLW and The Crash had also announced matches including MLW regulars Jacob Fatu, Mance Warner, Teddy Hart, Marshall Von Erich, Ross Von Erich and Japanese wrestler Minoru Tanaka for the show. The six wrestlers were not part of the show, forcing most matches to be modified from the originally scheduled matches.

=== Storylines ===
The Crash / Major League Wrestling Show featured nine professional wrestling matches scripted by The Crash with some wrestlers involved in scripted feuds. The wrestlers portray either heels (referred to as rudos in Mexico, those that play the part of the "bad guys") or faces (técnicos in Mexico, the "good guy" characters) as they perform.

== Results ==
No.	Results	Stipulations
1	Proximo and Terror Azteca defeated Ovett Jr. and Torito Negro	Tag Team match (MLW Fusion #81) -
2	Oraculo defeated Black Danger and Ricky Marvin	Three-way match (MLW Fusion #79) -
3	Los Haraganes (Animal, Demencia and Silver Star) defeated Triple Amenaza (Arandu, Star Boy and Zarco)	Six-man tag team match (MLW Fusion #80) -
4	The Dynasty (MJF and Richard Holliday) (c) defeated El Hijo de L.A. Park and L.A. Park Jr.	Tag Team match for the MLW World Tag Team Championship (MLW Fusion #79)
5	Jimmy Havoc defeated Damián 666 and Savio Vega	Three-way match (MLW Fusion #80)
6	El Hijo de L.A. Park vs. Josef Samael ended in a no-contest	Tijuana Street Fight (MLW Fusion #80)
7	The Hart Foundation (Brian Pillman Jr. and Davey Boy Smith Jr.) defeated Dragon Lee and Extreme Tiger	Tag Team match (MLW Fusion #81)
8	Rey Horus (c - The Crash) defeated Alexander Hammerstone (c - MLW) by disqualification	singles match for The Crash Heavyweight Championship and MLW National Openweight Championship match (MLW Fusion #79)
9	La Rebelión Amarilla (Bestia 666 and Mecha Wolf 450) and L.A. Park defeated Contra Unit (Ikuro Kwon, Josef Samael, and Simon Gotch)	Six-man tag team match (MLW Fusion #81)
(c) / – the champion(s) heading into the match

== Aftermath ==
The main event storyline culminated at MLW's first PPV Saturday Night SuperFight, where Josef Fatu successfully defended the MLW World Heavyweight Championship against L.A. Park in a no disqualification match.
