= The Crash Aniversario =

Mexican professional wrestling show series

- Company logo
- Promotions: The Crash Lucha Libre
- Other names: The Crash Anniversary
- First event: The Crash V Aniversario
- Last event: The Crash X Aniversario

The Crash Aniversario (Spanish for "The Crash Anniversary") is an annually recurring professional wrestling supercard event, scripted and produced by the Mexican lucha libre wrestling company The Crash Lucha Libre to commemorate the company holding their first show on November 4, 2011. The Crash has always held their Aniversario Shows in Auditorio Fausto Gutierrez in Tijuana, Baja California, Mexico where the first and the most The Crash shows are held.

The Crash promoted shows on a limited schedule from 2011 through 2015 and did not promote any shows in November to mark their anniversary. The company increased their show schedule in 2016 and held their first officially billed anniversary show on November 26, 2016, The Crash V Aniversario.

The most recent Aniversario show held by The Crash was The Crash VIII Aniversario show, held on November 1, 2019. Over the years the Aniversario shows have hosted three Lucha de Apuestas, or "bet matches" matches; Bestia 666 defeating Jack Evans in 2017, and Garza Jr. in 2018, in both instances the losers were shaved bald. In 2019 Triple Amenaza (Star Boy, Viento, and Zarco) defeated Los Haraganes (Animal, Demencia, and Silver Star) forcing all three Haraganes to unmask.

The Crash Women's Championship was introduced as part of The Crash V Aniversario show in 2016, and the first The Crash Heavyweight Championship holder was crowned as part of The Crash VII Aniversario show. The Crash anniversaries have also featured championship matches for the remained of The Crash's championships; The Crash Junior Championship, The Crash Cruiserweight Championship, and The Crash Tag Team Championship.

== The Crash debut show ==
No.	Results	Stipulations
1	Mosco Negro and Sargon defeated Clasico and Enigma	Best two-out-of-three falls tag team match
2	Kamaleon Negro and Kanalla defeated 5ta Dimension Jr. and Flecha Roja by disqualification	Best two-out-of-three falls tag team match
3	Cinico, Mr. Maldito, and Pandillero I defeated Colibri, Jonathan, and X-Torm	Best two-out-of-three falls six-man tag team match
4	Los Traumas (Trauma I and Trauma II) and Tony Casanova defeated Angel Metalico, Extassis and Venum Black	Best two-out-of-three falls six-man tag team match
5	El Hijo del Santo and Latin Lover defeated El Hijo del Solitario and Marco Corleone	Best two-out-of-three falls six-man tag team match

== Dates, venues, and main events ==
Event	Date	City	Venue	Main Event	Ref(s).
V Aniversario	November 26, 2016	Tijuana, Baja California, Mexico	Auditorio Fausto Gutierrez	Jeff Hardy, Rey Fénix, and Rey Mysterio Jr. vs. Jeff Cobb, Nicho el Millonario, and Teddy Hart	
VI Aniversario	November 4, 2017	Tijuana, Baja California, Mexico	Auditorio Fausto Gutierrez	Bestia 666 vs. Jack Evans in a Lucha de Apuestas, hair vs. hair match	
VII Aniversario	November 3, 2018	Tijuana, Baja California, Mexico	Auditorio Fausto Gutierrez	Bestia 666 vs. Garza Jr. in a Lucha de Apuestas, hair vs. hair match	
VIII Aniversario	November 1, 2019	Tijuana, Baja California, Mexico	Auditorio Fausto Gutierrez	Los Lucha Bros (Penta El 0M and Rey Fénix) vs. Los Hermanos Muñoz (Dragon Lee and Rush El Toro Blanco)	
X Aniversario	November 5, 2021	Tijuana, Baja California, Mexico	Auditorio Fausto Gutierrez	Pagano) vs. Masada, hardcore match	
