= The Crash/Fight Club: Pro show =

Mexican professional wrestling show

The Crash/Fight Club: Pro Show
- Official poster for the show
- Promotions: The Crash Lucha Libre; Fight Club: Pro
- Date: September 7, 2019
- City: Tijuana, Baja California, Mexico
- Venue: Auditorio Fausto Gutierrez

Event chronology
← Previous; The Crash VII Aniversario	Next → The Crash/MLW show

The Crash/Fight Club: Pro Show (Also referred to as FCP Project Mexico) was a professional wrestling supercard event, scripted and co-produced by the UK based Fight Club: Pro (FCP) promotion and the Tijuana, Mexico-based The Crash Lucha Libre (Crash) held in The Crash's home arena, Auditorio de Tijuana in Tijuana, Baja California, Mexico. The show was the first time that FCP and The Crash held a joint show. The show also featured wrestlers from Consejo Mundial de Lucha Libre (CMLL) as part of a The Crash/CMLL working arrangement at the time.

The main event of the six-show match featured The Crash's top group, La Rebelión Amarilla ("The Yellow Rebellion"; Bestia 666, Mecha Wolf 450 and Rey Horus) take on Fight Club: Pro's Moustache Mountain (Trent Seven and Tyler Bate) and Travis Banks in a traditional lucha libre Six-man tag team match, won by team FCP. The semi-main event featured two teams of brothers as CMLL representatives Nueva Generación Dinamita ("New Generation Dynamites"l El Cuatrero and Sansón) defeated Las Traumas (Trauma I and Trauma II) by disqualification when El Cuatrero threw his mask to Los Traumas, making it seem like they had unmasked El Cuatrero. The show included four additional matches, including the father/son team of Súper Astro and Súper Astro Jr., alongside Mr. Iguana defeating Triple Amenza (Arandú, Star Boy, and Zarco).

== Background ==
=== Production ===
The Mexican professional wrestling promotion The Crash Lucha Libre (The Crash) first started working with wrestlers from the UK based Fight Club: Pro (FCP) promotion in August 2018. For their August 3 show NXT UK/FCP wrestlers Pete Dunne, Trent Seven and Tyler Bate along with CCK (Chris Brookes and Kid Lykos) who represented FCP exclusively, were brought to Mexico for three matches against The Crash wrestlers. CCK defeated the teams of MexaBlood (Bandido and Flamita) and Soberano Jr./Stuka Jr. on the undercard. In the semi-main event La Rebelión Amarilla (Bestia 666 and Mecha Wolf 450) defeat Moustache Mountain (Seven and Bate). In the main event Dunne defeated Daga and Dragon Lee.

=== Storylines ===
The Crash/FCP Show featured six professional wrestling matches scripted by CMLL with some wrestlers involved in scripted feuds. The wrestlers portray either heels (referred to as rudos in Mexico, those that play the part of the "bad guys") or faces (técnicos in Mexico, the "good guy" characters) as they perform.

== Results ==
No.	Results	Stipulations
1	Miranda Alize and Torito Negro defeated Terror Azteca and Vipress	Tag team match
2	Ricky Martinez defeated Dan Moloney and El Mesías	Three-way match
3	Flamita defeated Rickey Shane Page	Singles match
4	Mr. Iguana, Súper Astro and Súper Astro Jr. defeated Triple Amenza (Arandú, Star Boy, and Zarco)	Six-man tag team match
5	Nueva Generación Dinamita (El Cuatrero and Sansón) defeated Las Traumas (Trauma I and Trauma II) by disqualification	Tag team match
6	Moustache Mountain (Trent Seven and Tyler Bate) and Travis Banks defeated La Rebelión Amarilla (Bestia 666, Mecha Wolf 450 and Rey Horus)	Six-man tag team match
