= The Crash VI Aniversario =

Mexico professional wrestling event

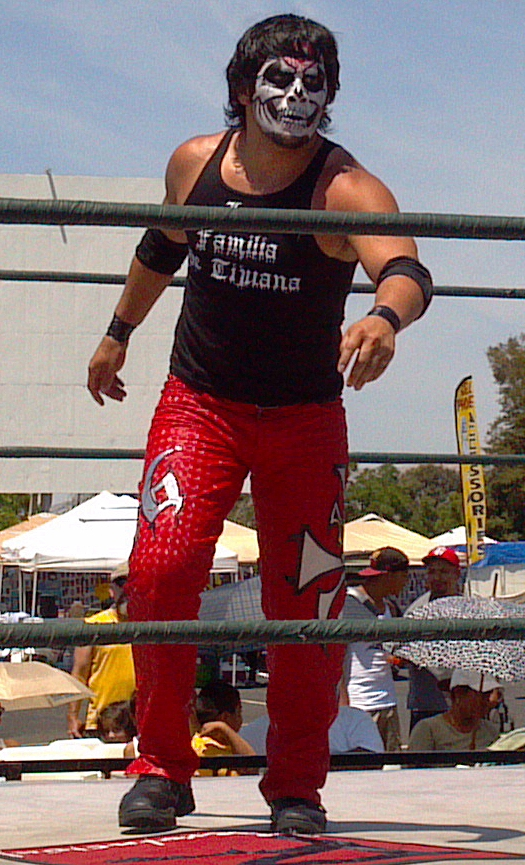
- Promotion: The Crash Lucha Libre
- Date: November 4, 2017
- City: Tijuana, Baja California, Mexico
- Venue: Auditorio Fausto Gutierrez
- Tagline: Bestia 666, won the hair of Jack Evans in the main event.

Event chronology
| ← Previous; The Crash V Aniversario | Next → The Crash WrestleCon |

The Crash Aniversario chronology
| ← Previous; V | Next → VII |

The Crash VI Aniversario or The Crash Sexto Aniversario (Spanish for The Crash 6th Anniversary Show) is a professional wrestling supercard event, scripted and produced by the Mexican lucha libre wrestling company The Crash Lucha Libre, which took place on November 4, 2017 at Auditorio Fausto Gutierrez in The Crash Lucha Libre's home town of Tijuana, Baja California. The event commemorated the creation of The Crash Lucha Libre in November 2011 and is their biggest show of the year.

The main event match was the payoff of a long running storyline feud between Bestia 666 and Jack Evans. The two rivals faced off in a Lucha de Apuestas, hair vs. hair match to settle it once and for all. The show ended with Bestia 666 pinning Evans. Forcing Evans to be shaved bald as a result. In the semi-main event, Rey Mysterio defeated Penta el 0M, La Máscara, and Rush to become the very first wrestler to hold The Crash Heavyweight Championship.

Among the remaining six matches, the Aniversario show featured Arkángel Divino successfully defending The Crash Junior Championship against Astrolux, Mirage, Tiago, Último Maldito, and Black Boy. Keyra retained The Crash Women's Championship against Baronessa, Christi Jaynes, and Lacey Lane

== Production ==
=== Background ===
The Crash Lucha Libre began operating on 2011, focusing mainly on promotion professional wrestling event in Tijuana, Baja California, Mexico. Their first show was held on November 4, 2011 with a main event of El Hijo del Santo and Latin Lover defeating El Hijo del Solitario and Marco Corleone. The Crash held shows on a limited schedule over the next couple of years; 4 in 2012, 4 in 2013, 2 in 2014, and 5 in 2015. The group held The Crash V Aniversario show on November 26, 2016, the first time they billed one of their shows as a direct celebration of their anniversary.

=== Storylines ===
The Crash VI Aniversario show featured eight professional wrestling matches scripted by The Crash with some wrestlers involved in scripted feuds. The wrestlers portray either heels (referred to as rudos in Mexico, those that play the part of the "bad guys") or faces (técnicos in Mexico, the "good guy" characters) as they perform in the ring.

== Results ==
| No. | Results | Stipulations |
|---|---|---|
| 1 | Arkángel Divino (c) defeated Astrolux, Mirage, Tiago, Último Maldito, and Black Boy | Six-way match for The Crash Junior Championship |
| 2 | Jonathan and Mascarita Dorada defeated Black Danger and Demus 3:16 by Disqualification | Tag team match |
| 3 | Keyra (c) defeated Baronessa, Christi Jaynes, and Lacey Lane | Four-way match for The Crash Women's Championship |
| 4 | Carlito, Damián 666, and M-ximo defeated Black Taurus, El Hijo de Pirata Morgan, and Pierroth | Six-man tag team match |
| 5 | War Machine (Hanson and Raymond Rowe) defeated Brian Cage and Shane Strickland, Mr. 450 and Willie Mack | Three Way Tag Team Match |
| 6 | Flamita and Laredo Kid defeated Flip Gordon and Sammy Guevara | Tag team match |
| 7 | Rey Mysterio defeated Penta el 0M, La Máscara, and Rush | Four-way match for vacant The Crash Heavyweight Championship |
| 8 | Bestia 666 defeated Jack Evans | Lucha de Apuestas, hair vs. hair match |
(c) / – the champion(s) heading into the match
