= Arkángel Divino =

Mexican professional wrestler

Personal information
- Born: Aguascalientes City, Aguascalientes, Mexico

Professional wrestling career
- Ring names: Arkángel Divino; Arkángel Celestial; Bengala
- Billed height: 170 cm (5 ft 7 in)
- Billed weight: 76 kg (168 lb)
- Trained by: Destroyer; Extassis; Príncipe Arandú; Black Spider
- Debut: November 22, 2013

Adrián Gómez, known by the ring name Arkángel Divino, is a Mexican professional wrestler. He currently wrestles for Lucha Libre AAA Worldwide where he also wrestled under the ring name Bengala.

Arkángel Divino began his career around 2006 by wrestling with his brother Último Maldito on the streets of his hometown of Aguascalientes City, and later in both Mexicali and Tijuana in northern Mexico where they both came to be based. They wrestled at pedestrian crossings and at red lights and then begged for money from motorists. At the same time, they recorded videos from the wrestling and the clips were uploaded to YouTube, where they received attention.

== Professional wrestling career ==
On November 22, 2013, Arkángel Divino made his professional wrestling debut when he and his brother Último Maldito were invited to participate in Lucha Libre AAA Worldwide. They wrestled in an unofficial first match, which was not broadcast on TV. In the match, Arkangel Divino made his own version of the maneuver 'La Mistica', created by Místico, who then won the prize for "Moment of the Year" in the TV show Tercera Caída.

=== The Crash Lucha Libre (2016–2018) ===
In 2016, Arkángel Divino signed for Tijuana-based The Crash Lucha Libre, then the third largest promotion in Mexico behind the CMLL and AAA, and on August 13 of that year, he made his promotional debut. On January 21, 2017, he won The Crash Junior Championship when he defeated Black Danger. He would defend the title in three matches during the year before losing to Black Boy on December 25 of that year.

=== Lucha Libre AAA Worldwide (2018–present) ===
In April 2018, Arkángel Divino moved to Lucha Libre AAA Worldwide. On April 20, he made his debut appearance in the promotion in his new hometown, Tijuana. The match was awarded 4.5 stars (out of 5 possible) in the American magazine Wrestling Observer Newsletter. On June 3, he wrestled in his first pay-per-view event, Verano de Escándalo in Monterrey. He wrestled extensively in televised matches in AAA in 2018 and the first half of 2019, often in the first or second match at an event. He was not one of the big names, but his matches often received good reviews from critics.

On September 8, 2019, at an event in Puebla, Arkángel Divino was repackaged as Bengala, used by several AAA wrestlers. However, he still uses the name Arkángel Divino when wrestling outside of AAA (which is allowed by AAA, but not for directly competing promotions like CMLL).

== Championships and accomplishments ==
- The Crash Lucha Libre

- The Crash Junior Championship (1 time)
