= La Rebelión Amarilla =

Mexican professional wrestling group

- La Rebelión Amarilla logo and motto: La Rebelión nace cuando el respeto muere ("The Rebellion begins when respect dies")

Stable
- Members: Bestia 666 (2nd leader); Black Danger; Mecha Wolf 450; Rey Horus
- Name(s): La Rebelión Amarilla; La Rebelión (NWA)
- Former members: Garza Jr. (1st leader); Último Ninja; Lacey Lane; Black Tauro; El Hijo del Fantasma
- Debut: August 2017
- Years active: 2017–2024

La Rebelión Amarilla (Spanish for "The Yellow Rebellion") was a rudo (the villains of professional wrestling") professional wrestling group who worked primarily for The Crash Lucha Libre and on the Mexican Independent circuit from August 2017 to 2024. The group was founded when Garza Jr. broke away from the group known as La Rebelión and formed his own faction instead. Garza Jr. was the leader of the group from its creation until his departure from Mexico in March 2019.

Bestia 666 was the current leader of the group, which also includes Mecha Wolf 450, Rey Horus and Black Danger. Beyond Garza Jr., the team has also included Último Ninja, Lacey Lane, Black Tauro and El Hijo del Fantasma. Bestia 666 and Mecha Wolf are former two-time NWA World Tag Team Champions (as La Rebelión) and The Crash Tag Team Champions. Rey Horus held The Crash Heavyweight Championship and Lane held The Crash Women's Championship while part of La Rebelión Amarilla.

== Background ==
On January 21, 2017, the day after Guerra de Titanes, Garza Jr. left AAA and made a surprise appearance at a "The Crash" show in Tijuana, Baja California alongside Daga and Pentagón Jr. who also left AAA. The trio was joined by Rey Fénix, stating that they were now independent of AAA and were forming a group. The group of Penta, Rey Fénix, Daga and Garza Jr. later announced that they would not be using the Perros del Mal name for the group, like Pentagón Jr. and Daga had used in AAA but instead come up with a new name for the group. The group was named La Rebelión and would later include El Zorro and Rey Mysterio Jr. as well.

== La Rebelión Amarilla ==
In July 2017, Garza Jr. turned on the other members of La Rebelión, declaring a "war" against all members, especially Pentagón Jr. In mid-August Bestia 666 joined forces with Garza Jr. as the two attacked Bestia's father Damián 666. Afterward they declared themselves to be La Rebelión Amarilla. La Rebelión Amarilla' first feud was with La Familia de Tijuana led by Damián as most of the original Rebelión (sometimes referred to as La Rebelión Roja) members were often booked for other companies than The Crash. On September 2, 2017, the group added another member as Black Danger declared his allegiance after defeating Oráculo in a Lucha de Apuestas, mask vs. mask match. Although Black Danger rarely has appearances with the faction. Late in 2017, Puerto Rican wrestler Mr. 450 (later referred to as "Mecha Wolf 450") joined the team, followed by Garza Jr.'s cousin Último Ninja, female wrestler Lacey Lane, and Black Tauro.

On January 20, 2018, Lane defeated Keira to win The Crash Women's Championship. La Rebelión Amarilla interfered in several matches, attacking both wrestlers and officials as The Crash started a storyline where initially all members were "Suspended for a year", but was later commuted to La Rebelión Amarilla working low card matches as punishment, forcing them to "earn" their way back into the main events. On July 14, 2018, Lacey Lane lost the women's championship to Tessa Blanchard, after which it was revealed that Lane was going to join WWE. during the summer Último Ninja also left The Crash to work for WWE, followed by Black Tauro working regularly for AAA, severing his ties with The Crash and La Rebelión Amarilla. In the fall of 2018 Bestia 666 stated that no member of La Rebelión would face them and instead made an open challenge for a Lucha de Apuestas, the challenge was answered by Garza Jr., setting the main event for The Crash VII Aniversario show on November 8. The match was won by Bestia 666, forcing Garza Jr. to have all his hair shaved off.

While Garza Jr. would later depart for WWE as well, the team added El Hijo del Fantasma to the group after he left AAA. Over the spring of 2019 Bestia and Hijo del Fantasma tried to recruit Rey Horus for La Rebelión Amarilla, efforts that were initially turned down. A few months later El Hijo del Fantasma also left to work for WWE. On May 4, 2019, Rey Horus won The Crash Heavyweight Championship and then joined La Rebelión Amarillo afterward. On May 24, Bestia 666 and Mecha Wolf won The Crash Tag Team Championship from their longtime rivals Pentagón Jr. and Fénix.

On August 29, 2021, at NWA 73rd Anniversary Show, as La Rebelión, Bestia 666 and Mecha Wolf won the NWA World Tag Team Championship defeating Aron Stevens and J. R. Kratos. On November 5, at The Crash X Aniversario they won the Crash Tag Team Championship for the second time. On August 27, 2022, at night 1 of the NWA 74th Anniversary Show, Bestia 666 and Mecha Wolf won the NWA World Tag Team Championship for the second time, defeating Hawx Aerie for the vacant titles. On January 30, 2024, Bestia 666 left NWA, ending La Rebelión.

== Members ==
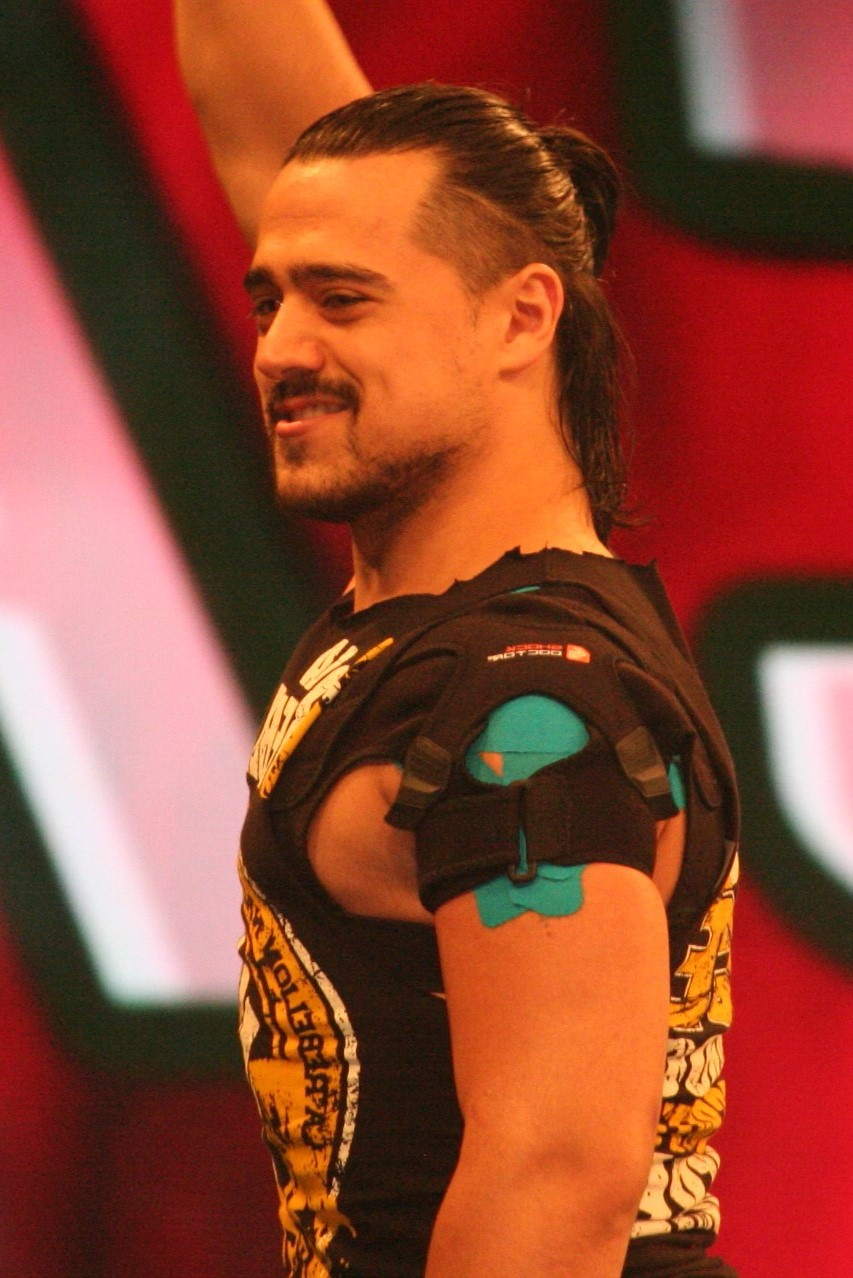
Garza Jr., founder and leader of the group until March 2019

Final line-up

- Bestia 666 (leader)
- Black Danger
- Mecha Wolf 450
- Rey Horus

Former

- Garza Jr. (founder)
- Último Ninja
- Lacey Lane
- Black Tauro
- Luke Hawx
- El Hijo del Fantasma

== Championships and accomplishments ==
- The Crash Lucha Libre

- The Crash Heavyweight Championship (1 time) – Rey Horus
- The Crash Tag Team Championship (2 times) – Bestia 666 and Mecha Wolf 450
- The Crash Women's Championship (1 time) – Lacey Lane

- Lucha Maniaks
  - Lucha Maniaks Tag Team Championship (1 time) - Bestia 666 and Mecha Wolf 450
- National Wrestling Alliance
  - NWA World Tag Team Championship (2 times) - Bestia 666 and Mecha Wolf 450
- TNT Extreme Wrestling
  - TNT Tag Team Championship (1 time) – Bestia 666 and Mecha Wolf 450

== Luchas de Apuestas record ==
Winner (wager)	Loser (wager)	Location	Event	Date	Notes
Black Danger (mask)	Oráculo (mask)	Tijuana, Baja California	The Crash show	September 2, 2017	
Bestia 666 (hair)	Jack Evans (hair)	Tijuana, Baja California	The Crash VI Aniversario	November 4, 2017	
Bestia 666 (hair)	Garza Jr. (hair)	Tijuana, Baja California	The Crash VII Aniversario	November 3, 2018	
