= The Crash VII Aniversario =

Mexican professional wrestling show

- Official poster for the 7th anniversary show
- Promotion: The Crash Lucha Libre
- Date: November 3, 2018
- City: Tijuana, Baja California, Mexico
- Venue: Auditorio Fausto Gutierrez

Event chronology
← Previous; The Crash WrestleCon	Next → The Crash/FCP show

The Crash Aniversario chronology
← Previous; VI	Next → VIII

The Crash VII Aniversario or The Crash Séptimo Aniversario (Spanish for The Crash 7th Anniversary Show) was a professional wrestling supercard event, scripted and produced by the Mexican lucha libre wrestling company The Crash Lucha Libre, which took place on November 3, 2018 at Auditorio Fausto Gutierrez in The Crash's home town of Tijuana, Baja California. In the main event Rebellion Amarilla members Garza Jr. and Bestia 666 faced off in a Luchas de Apuestas, hair vs. hair match, with the storyline being that Rebellion Amarilla claimed everyone else was afraid to take their challenge. In the end Bestia 666 forced Garza Jr. to submit and afterwards had all his hair shaved off as a result.

On the undercard Willie Mack won the vacant The Crash Heavyweight Championship by defeating Bárbaro Cavernario, Michael Elgin and El Mesías. Los Lucha Bros (Penta El 0M and The King) defeated Nueva Generacio Dinamita (El Cuatrero and Sansón) and Reno Scum (Adam Thornstowe and Luster the Legend) to win the vacant The Crash Tag Team Championship and X-Peria defeated Torito Negro (c), Tiago, Baby Star and Rayo Star to win The Crash Junior Championship. The show featured four additional matches

== Production ==
=== Background ===
The Crash Lucha Libre began operating on 2011, focusing mainly on promotion professional wrestling event in Tijuana, Baja California, Mexico. Their first show was held on November 4, 2011 with a main event of El Hijo del Santo and Latin Lover defeating El Hijo del Solitario and Marco Corleone. The Crash held shows on a limited schedule over the next couple of years; 4 in 2012, 4 in 2013, 2 in 2014, and 5 in 2015.

The group held The Crash V Aniversario show on November 26, 2016, the first time they billed one of their shows as a direct celebration of their anniversary. They continued the tradition in 2017 with The Crash VI Aniversario show.

== Event ==
The Crash VII Aniversario Show featured eight professional wrestling matches scripted by The Crash with some wrestlers involved in scripted feuds. The wrestlers portray either heels (referred to as rudos in Mexico, those that play the part of the "bad guys") or faces (técnicos in Mexico, the "good guy" characters) as they perform in the ring.

== Aftermath ==
After the match Garza Jr. took time off to deal with a shoulder injury, returning to The Crash in early 2019. He would wrestle a total of four matches in 2019 before he moved to the United States to start working for WWE's NXT promotion under the name Angel Garza.

Willie Mack's reign as The Crash Tag Team Championship lasted a total of 119 days, until November 3, 2018 where he lost the championship to Austin Theory in one of the featured matches at one of The Crash shows, in a match that also included Bárbaro Cavernario and Sansón. The championship reign of Los Lucha Bros lasted until May 24, 2019 when were defeated by La Rebelión Amarilla.

Blanchard's The Crash Women's Championship reign that began at the VII Aniversarios show ended on February 9, 2019 when The Crash announced that the championship had been vacated due to Blanchard not being available for championship matches. Xperia's The Crash Junior Championship reign lasted for a total for a total of 202 days until he lost it to Tiago on May 24, 2019.

== Results ==
No.	Results	Stipulations
1	Zarco, Starboy, Viento and Talibán defeated Jonathan, Súper Caló Jr., Valentino and Ruby Gardenia.	Eight-man "Lucha Libre rules" tag team match
2	Xperia defeated Torito Negro (c), Tiago, Baby Star and Rayo Star	Five-way match for The Crash Junior Championship
3	Oráculo defeated Templario and Éxtasis	Three-way match
4	Mr. 450 defeated Rey Horus, Shane Strickland and Austin Theory	Four-way match
5	Tessa Blanchard (c) defeated Lluvia, Kiera Hogan and Lady Flammer	Four-way match for The Crash Women's Championship
6	Los Lucha Bros (Penta El 0M and The King) defeated Nueva Generacio Dinamita (El Cuatrero and Sansón) and Reno Scum (Adam Thornstowe and Luster the Legend)	Three-way tag team match for the vacant The Crash Tag Team Championship
7	Willie Mack defeated Bárbaro Cavernario, Michael Elgin and El Mesías	Four-way match for the vacant The Crash Heavyweight Championship
8	Bestia 666 defeated Garza Jr.	Lucha de Apuestas, hair vs. hair match
(c) / – the champion(s) heading into the match
