= The Crash Junior Championship =

Mexican professional wrestling championship

- The championship belt

Details
- Promotion: The Crash Lucha Libre; Lucha Libre Tijuanese
- Date established: July 3, 2015
- Current champion: Amnesia Jr
- Date won: March 20, 2026
Statistics
- First champion: Star Dragon
- Most reigns: Black Boy (2 times)
- Longest reign: Dinámico (622 days)
- Shortest reign: Astrolux (64 days)

The Crash Junior Championship (Spanish: Campeonato de Peso Junior de The Crash) is a professional wrestling championship contested for in the Mexican lucha libre promotion The Crash Lucha Libre based in Tijuana, Baja California.

The Junior Championship is a secondary championship, behind both The Crash Heavyweight Championship and The Crash Cruiserweight Championship, primarily for lower ranked, younger wrestlers. As it was a professional wrestling championship, the championship was not won not by actual competition, but by a scripted ending to a match determined by the bookers and match makers. (Note: Hornbaker (2016) p. 550: "Professional wrestling is a sport in which match finishes are predetermined. Thus, win–loss records are not indicative of a wrestler's genuine success based on their legitimate abilities – but on now much, or how little they were pushed by promoters") On occasion the promotion declares a championship vacant, which means there is no champion at that point in time. This can either be due to a storyline, (Note: Duncan & Will (2000) p. 271, Chapter: Texas: NWA American Tag Team Title [World Class, Adkisson] "Championship held up and rematch ordered because of the interference of manager Gary Hart") or real life issues such as a champion suffering an injury being unable to defend the championship, (Note: Duncan & Will (2000) p. 20, Chapter: (United States: 19th Century & widely defended titles – NWA, WWF, AWA, IW, ECW, NWA) NWA/WCW TV Title "Rhodes stripped on 85/10/19 for not defending the belt after having his leg broken by Ric Flair and Ole & Arn Anderson") or leaving the company. (Note: Duncan & Will (2000) p. 201, Chapter: (Memphis, Nashville) Memphis: USWA Tag Team Title "Vacant on 93/01/18 when Spike leaves the USWA.")

The first junior champion was Star Dragón, which he became by winning a five-way elimination match over Black Boy, Destroyer, Enigma, Mirage and Mosco Negro. Amnesia Jr is current junior champion, having defeated Atomick Star to win the championship a The Crash event on March 20, 2026. This is his first reign as champion. Overall, seventeen wrestlers share eighteen championship reigns, with only one wrestler, Black Boy, holding the championship twice. Astrolux's 64-day reign is the shortest in the championship's history, while Dinámico's 622-day reign is the longest reign so far.

== Title history ==
Key
No.	Overall reign number
Reign	Reign number for the specific champion
Days	Number of days held
+	Current reign is changing daily

No.	Champion	Championship change			Reign statistics		Notes	Ref.
No.	Champion	Date	Event	Location	Reign	Days	Notes	Ref.
1	Star Dragón	July 3, 2015	The Crash show	Tijuana, Baja California	1	100	Defeated Black Boy, Destroyer, Enigma, Mirage and Mosco Negro in five-way elimination match to become the inaugural champion.	
2	Mirage	October 11, 2015	The Crash	Tijuana, Baja California	1	124	This was a two-out-of-three falls match.	
3	Black Boy	February 12, 2016	The Crash	Tijuana, Baja California	1	163	This was a five-way elimination match also involving Jinzo and Proximo and Septimo Dragon	
4	Black Danger	July 24, 2016	The Crash	Tijuana, Baja California	1	181		
5	Arkángel Divino	January 21, 2017	The Crash	Tijuana, Baja California	1	338		
6	Black Boy	December 25, 2017	Team 19/27 Promotions live event	Mexicali, Baja California	2	82		
—	Vacated	March 17, 2018	—	—	—	—	Declared vacant when Black Boy did not show up for a scheduled championship defense.	
7	Astrolux	March 17, 2018	The Crash	Tijuana, Baja California	1	64	Won a six-way elimination match over Tiago, Latigo, Rayo Star and Torito Negro to win the vacant championship	
8	Torito Negro	May 20, 2018	The Crash	Tlaxcala, Tlaxcala	1	167		
9	Xperia	November 3, 2018	The Crash VII Aniversario	Tijuana, Baja California	1	202	Match also included Tiago, Baby Star and Rayo Star	
10	Tiago	May 24, 2019	The Crash show	Tijuana, Baja California	1	139	Match also included Torito Negro.	
—	Vacated	October 10, 2019	—	—	—	—	The Crash announced a match for the vacant championship at The Crash VIII Aniversario.	
11	Terror Azteca	November 1, 2019	The Crash VIII Aniversario	Tijuana, Baja California	1	113	Won the vacant championship in a match against Toto, Próximo, Baby Xtreme, and Soldado del Invierno.	
12	Dinámico	February 22, 2020	The Crash	Tijuana, Baja California	1	622	Defeated previous champion Terror Azteca and Baby Extreme in. Three-way match.	
13	Toto	November 5, 2021	The Crash X Aniversario	Tijuana, Baja California	1	238	This was a six-way match that also included Terror Azteca, Proximo, Kamika-C and Skalibur.	
14	Proximo	July 1, 2022	The Crash	Tijuana, Baja California	1	266		
15	Anubis	March 24, 2023	The Crash	Tijuana, Baja California	1	224		
16	Gallo Extreme	November 3, 2023	The Crash 12. Aniversario	Tijuana, Baja California	1	595	Defeated the Champion Anubis, Noisy Boy and Rey Furia and El Rey in a Five Way	
17	Atomik Star	June 20, 2025	The Crash	Tijuana, Baja California	1	385+		

== Combined reigns ==
†	Indicates the current champion

Rank	Wrestler	No. of reigns	Combined days
1	Dinámico	1	622
2	Arkángel Divino	1	338
3	Gallo Extreme	1	565
4	Proximo	1	266
5	Black Boy	2	245
6	Toto	1	238
7	Anubis	1	224
8	Xperia	1	202
9	Black Danger	1	181
10	Torito Negro	1	167
11	Atomik Star †	1	136+
12	Tiago	1	137
13	Mirage	1	124
14	Terror Azteca	1	113
15	Star Dragón	1	100
16	Astrolux	1	64
