= The Crash Tag Team Championship =

Professional wrestling tag team championship

- One of the two belts representing the championship

Details
- Promotion: The Crash Lucha Libre
- Date established: May 8, 2015
- Current champions: Good Brothers (Doc Gallows and Karl Anderson)
- Date won: November 7, 2025
Statistics
- First champions: Black Boy and Rey Horus
- Most reigns: As team: Los Lucha Bros and La Rebelión Amarilla (2 reigns); As individual: Penta 0M, Rey Fenix, Mecha Wolf and Bestaia 666 (2 reigns)
- Longest reign: Los Traumas (622 days)
- Shortest reign: Los Lucha Bros (Rey Fénix and Penta 0M) (20 days)
- Oldest champion: L.A. Park (53 years, 233 days)
- Youngest champion: Black Boy (17 years)
- Heaviest champion: Doc Gallows (290 lbs)
- Lightest champion: Flamita (161 lbs)

The Crash Tag Team Championship (Campeonato en Parejas de The Crash in Spanish) is a professional wrestling tag team championship promoted by the Tijuana, Baja California, Mexico based The Crash Lucha Libre and is for two-man tag teams only. The championship was first introduced on May 8, 2015, and was the second championship created by the Crash, after The Crash Cruiserweight Championship was introduced in 2013. As it was a professional wrestling championship, the championship was not won not by actual competition, but by a scripted ending to a match determined by the bookers and match makers. (Note: Hornbaker (2016) p. 550: "Professional wrestling is a sport in which match finishes are predetermined. Thus, win–loss records are not indicative of a wrestler's genuine success based on their legitimate abilities – but on how much, or how little they were pushed by promoters") On occasion the promotion declares a championship vacant, which means there is no champion at that point in time. This can either be due to a storyline, (Note: Duncan & Will (2000) p. 271, Chapter: Texas: NWA American Tag Team Title [World Class, Adkisson] "Championship held up and rematch ordered because of the interference of manager Gary Hart") or real life issues such as a champion suffering an injury being unable to defend the championship, (Note: Duncan & Will (2000) p. 20, Chapter: (United States: 19th Century & widely defended titles – NWA, WWF, AWA, IW, ECW, NWA) NWA/WCW TV Title "Rhodes stripped on 85/10/19 for not defending the belt after having his leg broken by Ric Flair and Ole & Arn Anderson") or leaving the company. (Note: Duncan & Will (2000) p. 201, Chapter: (Memphis, Nashville) Memphis: USWA Tag Team Title "Vacant on 93/01/18 when Spike leaves the USWA.")

The first champions were the team of Black Boy and Rey Horus who defeated the teams of Bestia 666 and Mosco Negro, and Daga and Steve Pain. Bestia 666 and Mecha Wolf and Lucha Brothers are the only tag teams who have held the championship twice, with eight different teams holding the championship. The belts were vacated in March 2017 when then-champions The Broken Hardys (Matt Hardy and Jeff Hardy) signed a full-time contract with WWE. The team of Tony Casanova and Zarco have held the championship the longest, 330 days while The Broken Hardys have the record for shortest reign, 41 days. Los Golpeadores (Alpha Wolf and Dragon Bane) are the current champions, they defeated Los Traumas (Trauma I and Trauma II) and Dinamico and Emperador Azteca in a three-way match to win the vacant titles at The Crash on March 24, 2023.

== Title history ==
Key
No.	Overall reign number
Reign	Reign number for the specific team—reign numbers for the individuals are in parentheses, if different
Days	Number of days held
+	Current reign is changing daily

No.	Champion	Championship change			Reign statistics		Notes	Ref.
No.	Champion	Date	Event	Location	Reign	Days	Notes	Ref.
1	Black Boy and Rey Horus	May 8, 2015	The Crash	Tijuana, Baja California	1	133	Black Boy and Rey Horus defeated Bestia 666 and Mosco Negro, and Daga and Steve Pain in the Three way match to become the inaugural champions.	
2	Tony Casanova and Zarco	September 18, 2015	The Crash	Guaymas, Sonora	1	330		
3	Garza Jr. and Último Ninja	August 13, 2016	The Crash	Tijuana, Baja California	1	161	This was a Two out of Three falls match.	
—	Vacated	January 21, 2017	—	—	—	—	Championship was vacated for undocumented reasons.	
4	The Broken Hardys (Matt and Jeff Hardy)	January 21, 2017	The Crash	Tijuana, Baja California	1	41	Defeated Juventud Guerrera and Super Crazy to win the vacant titles.	
—	Vacated	March 3, 2017	—	—	—	—	Title vacated after The Broken Hardys left Impact Wrestling.	
5	MexaBlood (Bandido and Flamita)	March 17, 2018	The Crash	Tijuana, Baja California	1	204	Defeated Aeroboy and Septimo Dragon and The Rascalz (Dezmond Xavier and Zachary Wentz) in Three way match to win the vacate titles.	
—	Vacated	October 7, 2018	—	—	—	—	Championship declared vacant for undocumented reasons.	
6	Los Lucha Bros (The King/Rey Fénix and Penta 0M)	November 3, 2018	The Crash VII Aniversario	Tijuana, Baja California	1	24	Defeated Nueva Generación Dinamita (El Cuatrero and Sansón) and Reno Scum (Adam Thornstowe and Luster the Legend) in Three way match to win the vacate titles.	
—	Vacated	November 27, 2018	—	—	—	—	Championship declared vacant when Rey Fénix was injured and not able to compete.	
†	Los Lucha Bros (The King/Rey Fénix and Penta 0M)	May 4, 2019	The Crash show	Tijuana, Baja California	2	20	For unexplained reasons, they were billed as champions again for the May 4, 2019 show. This is considered a continuation of their previous reign.	
7	La Rebelión Amarilla (Bestia 666 and Mecha Wolf)	May 24, 2019	The Crash	Tijuana, Baja California	1	274	Some sites listed L.A. Park and El Hijo de L.A. Park as champions from July 5, 2019 and on, but the match was later confirmed to not be for the championship.	
8	Los Traumas (Trauma I and Trauma II)	February 22, 2020	The Crash show	Tijuana, Baja California	1	622	Steel cage match that also included the team of El Mesías and Oráculo	
9	La Rebelión Amarilla (Bestia 666 and Mecha Wolf)	November 5, 2021	The Crash X Aniversario	Tijuana, Baja California	2	308	The match also included Los Mercenarios (Taurus and Rey Escorpion) and Funny Bone and Super Beast	
10	La Facción Ingobernable (Dragon Lee and Dralístico)	September 9, 2022	The Crash	Tijuana, Baja California	2	126	La Facción Ingobernable defeated Sangre Texano (El Texano Jr. and Super Nova) and LA Park and LA Park Jr. in a three-way match for the vacant titles.	
—	Vacated	January 13, 2023	—	—	—	—	Titles vacated for undocumented reasons. On this date, they also vacated the KAOZ Tag Team Championship.	
11	Los Golpeadores (Dragón Bane and Alpha Wolf)	March 24, 2023	The Crash	Tijuana, Baja California	1	462	Los Golpeadores defeated Arkangel Divino and Ultimo Maldito in a double title match to also determine new KAOZ Tag Team Champions.	
12	El Hijo de Dr. Wagner Jr. and Galeno del Mal	June 28, 2024	The Crash	Tijuana, Baja California	1	497		
13	Good Brothers (Doc Gallows and Karl Anderson)	November 7, 2025	The Crash XIV Aniversario	Tijuana, Baja California	1	84+	This was a three-way also involving D'Luxe & Pierroth Jr.	

== Combined reigns ==
As of January 30, 2026.

=== By team ===
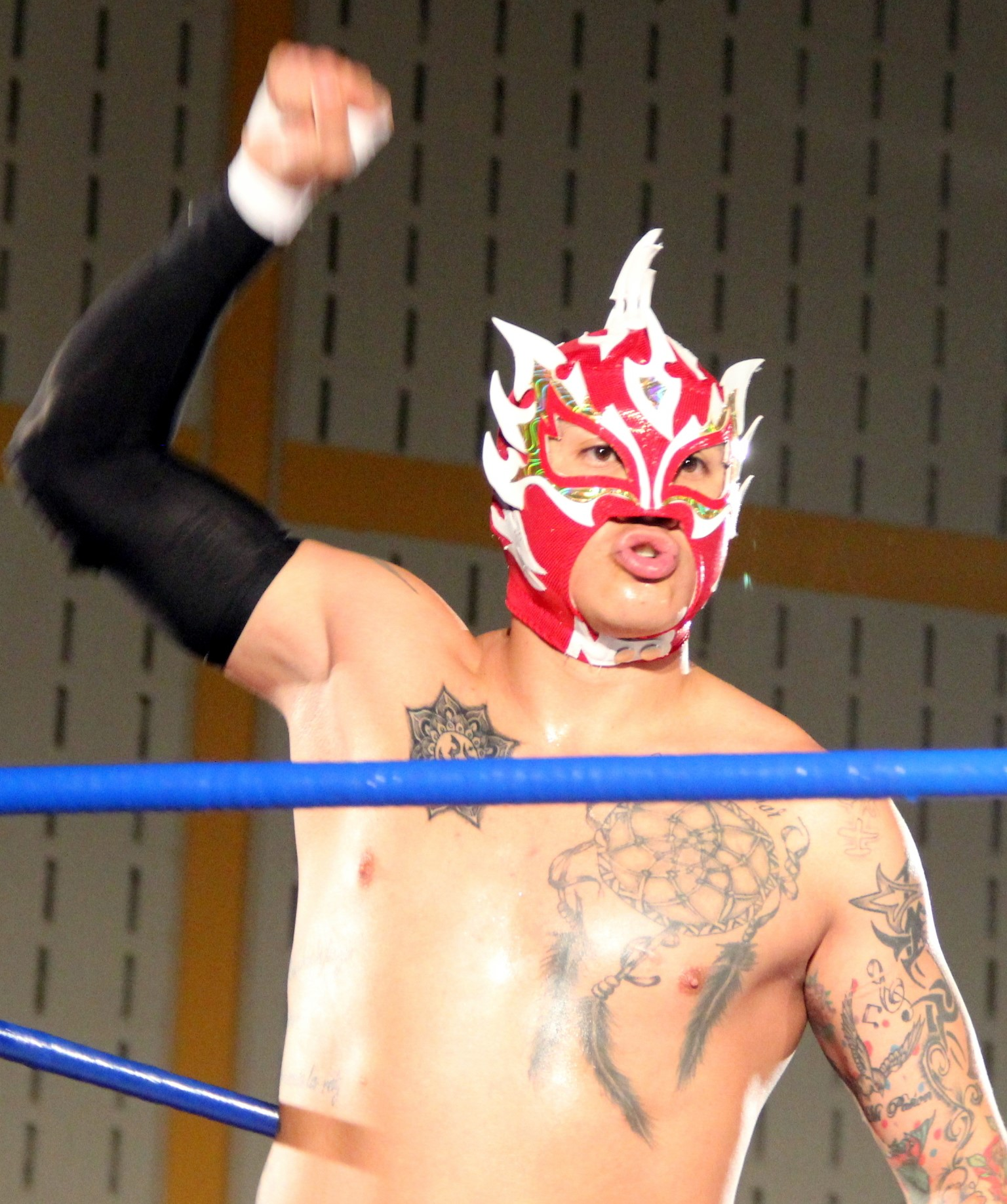
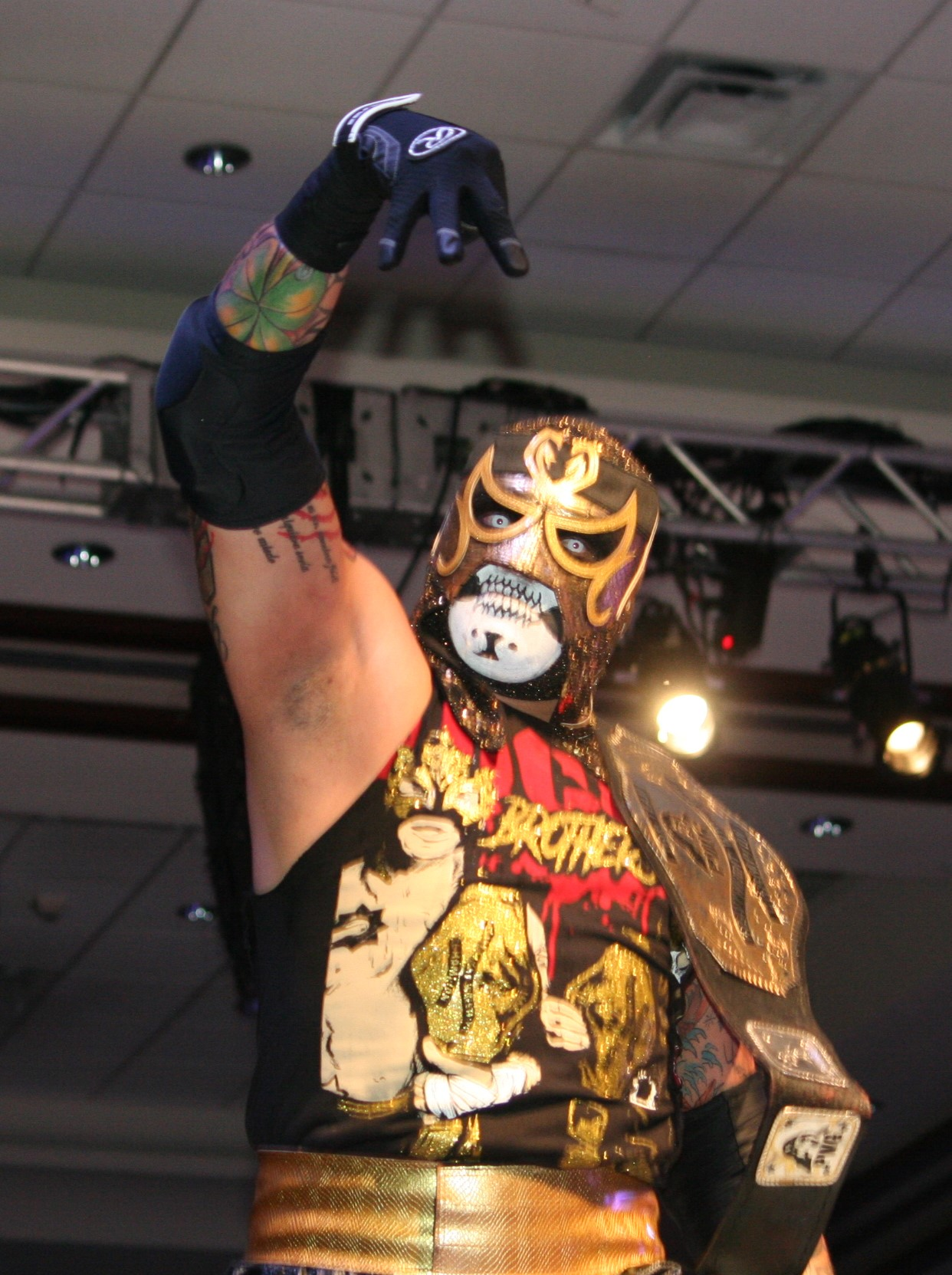
Record two-time and shortest reigning champions Los Lucha Bros (The King/Rey Fénix and Penta 0M)

†	Indicates the current champion

Rank	Team	No. of reigns	Combined days
1	Los Traumas (Trauma I and Trauma II)	1	622
2	La Rebelión Amarilla (Bestia 666 and Mecha Wolf)	2	582
3	Los Golpeadores (Dragón Bane and Alpha Wolf)	1	462
4	El Hijo de Dr. Wagner Jr. and Galeno del Mal	1	497
5	Tony Casanova and Zarco	1	330
6	MexaBlood (Bandido and Flamita)	1	204
7	Garza Jr. and Último Ninja	1	161
8	Black Boy and Rey Horus	1	133
9	La Facción Ingobernable (Dragon Lee and Dralístico)	1	126
10	Los Lucha Bros (The King/Rey Fénix and Penta 0M)	2	44
11	The Broken Hardys (Matt and Jeff Hardy)	1	41
12	Good Brothers (Doc Gallows and Karl Anderson)†	1	31+

=== By wrestler ===
Rank	Wrestler	No. of reigns	Combined days
1	Trauma I	1	622
1	Trauma II	1	622
3	Bestia 666	2	592
3	Mecha Wolf	2	592
5
5	El Hijo de Dr. Wagner Jr.	1	497
Galeno del Mal		1	497
7	Alpha Wolf	1	462
7	Dragón Bane	1	462
9	Tony Casanova	1	330
9	Zarco	1	330
11	Bandido	1	204
11	Flamita	1	204
13	Garza Jr.	1	161
13	Último Ninja	1	161
15	Black Boy	1	133
15	Rey Horus	1	133
17	Dragon Lee	1	126
17	Dralístico	1	126
19	Doc Gallows †	1	84+
19	Karl Anderson †	1	84+
21	The King/Rey Fénix	2	44
21	Penta 0M	2	44
21	Matt Hardy	1	41
21	Jeff Hardy	1	41
