= The Crash Cruiserweight Championship =

Mexican professional wrestling championship

- The championship belt

Details
- Promotion: The Crash Lucha Libre
- Date established: June 14, 2013
- Current champion: Noisy Boy
- Date won: November 7, 2025
Statistics
- First champion: Fénix
- Most reigns: Rey Fénix (2 times)
- Longest reign: Oraculo (735 days)
- Shortest reign: Rey Horus (65 days)
- Oldest champion: Rey Horus (32 years, 343 days)
- Youngest champion: Flamita (21 years, 257 days)
- Heaviest champion: Bestia 666 (95 kg (209 lb))
- Lightest champion: Flamita (73 kg (161 lb))

The Crash Cruiserweight Championship (Spanish: Campeonato de Peso Crucero de The Crash) is a professional wrestling championship contested for in the Mexican lucha libre promotion The Crash Lucha Libre based in Tijuana, Baja California. Traditionally most lucha libre promotions promote a division labelled as the "Junior Heavyweight" division, while "Cruiserweight" is a term more used in the United States or Canada but The Crash uses the term "Cruiserweight". The official definition of the Cruiserweight class in Mexico is between 97 kg (214 lb) and 107 kg (236 lb), but is not always strictly enforced. (Note: One example the weight limits not being strictly enforced is Mephisto winning the CMLL World Welterweight Championship, a championship with a 78 kg (172 lb) upper limit despite weighing 90 kg (200 lb).) As it was a professional wrestling championship, the championship was not won not by actual competition, but by a scripted ending to a match determined by the bookers and match makers. (Note: Hornbaker (2016) p. 550: "Professional wrestling is a sport in which match finishes are predetermined. Thus, win–loss records are not indicative of a wrestler's genuine success based on their legitimate abilities – but on now much, or how little they were pushed by promoters") On occasion the promotion declares a championship vacant, which means there is no champion at that point in time. This can either be due to a storyline, (Note: Duncan & Will (2000) p. 271, Chapter: Texas: NWA American Tag Team Title [World Class, Adkisson] "Championship held up and rematch ordered because of the interference of manager Gary Hart") or real life issues such as a champion suffering an injury being unable to defend the championship, (Note: Duncan & Will (2000) p. 20, Chapter: (United States: 19th Century & widely defended titles – NWA, WWF, AWA, IW, ECW, NWA) NWA/WCW TV Title "Rhodes stripped on 85/10/19 for not defending the belt after having his leg broken by Ric Flair and Ole & Arn Anderson") or leaving the company. (Note: Duncan & Will (2000) p. 201, Chapter: (Memphis, Nashville) Memphis: USWA Tag Team Title "Vacant on 93/01/18 when Spike leaves the USWA.")

From its creation in 2013 until the introduction of The Crash Heavyweight Championship in late 2017, the cruiserweight championship was the highest profile singles championship in the promotion. The current champion is Noisy Boy, who won the championship on November 7, 2025, when he defeated then-champion Tonalli in a four-way ladder match that also included Halloween NG and Oni El Bendito. Fénix was the first champion, having won a multi-man match on June 14, 2013, to become the inaugural champion, Oraculo is the only wrestler to have won the championship twice. Ángel Metálico's championship run from February 1, 2014 to May 8, 2015 (461 days) is the longest in the history of the championship, while Rey Horus' 65 day reign is the shortest. The championship has been declared vacant twice, first when then-champion Bestia 666 was unable to defend the championship in 2016, and again in early 2018 when Fénix vacated the championship as he moved into the heavyweight division.

== Title history ==
Key
No.	Overall reign number
Reign	Reign number for the specific champion
Days	Number of days held
+	Current reign is changing daily

No.	Champion	Championship change			Reign statistics		Notes	Ref.
No.	Champion	Date	Event	Location	Reign	Days	Notes	Ref.
1	Fénix	June 14, 2013	N/A	Tijuana, Baja California	1	232	Defeated Ángel Metálico, Flamita, Pentagón Jr., Star Boy, Tony Casanova, Willie Mack and X-Torm in eight-way elimination match to become the inaugural champion.	
2	Ángel Metálico	February 1, 2014	The Crash show	Tijuana, Baja California	1	461	This was a four-way Ladder match, also involving Daga and Star Boy.	
3	Pentagón Jr.	May 8, 2015	The Crash show	Tijuana, Baja California	1	147	This was a four-way match also involving Drago and Zarco	
4	Bestia 666	October 2, 2015	The Crash show	N/A	1	(Note: The exact date the championship was vacated has not been confirmed which means that the championship reign lasted between 91 and 316 days.)		
—	Vacated	2016	—	—	—	—	Championship vacated for undocumented reasons	
5	Flamita	August 13, 2016	The Crash show	Tijuana, Baja California	1	293	Defeated El Torito, Fly Warrior, Laredo Kid, Lince Dorado, Septimo Dragon and Willie Mack to win the vacant title.	
6	Rey Horus	June 2, 2017	The Crash show	Tijuana, Baja California	1	65		
7	Rey Fénix	August 6, 2017	The Crash/Revolucha show	Monterrey, Nuevo Leon	2	252	This was a four-way match also involving Ultimo Ninja and Sammy Guevara	
—	Vacated	April 15, 2018	—	Mexicali, Baja California	—	—	Rey Fénix announced that he was moving up to the heavyweight division.	
8	Bandido	May 19, 2018	The Crash show	Monterrey, Nuevo Leon	1	308	Defeated Laredo Kid and Dezmond Xavier to win the vacant championship	
9	Jonathan Gresham	March 23, 2019	The Crash show	Monterrey, Nuevo Leon	1	223	Match also included Flamita and Shane Strickland	
9	Oraculo	November 1, 2019	The Crash VIII Aniversario	Monterrey, Nuevo Leon	1	735	Match also included Black Danger and Dinámico	
10	Dinámico	November 5, 2021	The Crash X Aniversario	Tijuana, Baja California	1	133	This was a three-way match that also included Black Danger.	
—	Vacated	March 18, 2022	—	Tijuana, Baja California	—	—	Diamonico signed with Ring of Honor	
11	Black Destiny	March 18, 2022	The Crash show	Tijuana, Baja California	1	966	Defeated Black Danger, Septimo Dragon and Skalibur in a fatal four way for the vacant title.	
12	Tonalli	November 8, 2024	The Crash XIII Aniversario	Tijuana, Baja California, Mexico	1	364		
13	Noisy Boy	November 7, 2025	The Crash XIII Aniversario	Tijuana, Baja California, Mexico	1	228+		

== Combined reigns ==
†	Indicates the current champion
¤	The exact length of at least one title reign is uncertain.
+	Indicates that the date changes daily for the current champion.

Rank	Wrestler	No. of reigns	Combined days
1	Black Destiny	1	966
2	Oraculo	1	735
3	Fénix	2	484
4	Ángel Metálico	1	461
5	Tonalli †	1	364
6	Bandido	1	308
7	Flamita	1	293
8	Jonathan Gresham	1	223
9	Pentagón Jr.	1	147
10	Dinámico	1	133
11	Bestia 666	1	91¤
12	Rey Horus	1	65
13	Noisy Boy†	1	13+
