= Mecha Wolf =

Puerto Rican wrestler (born 1987)

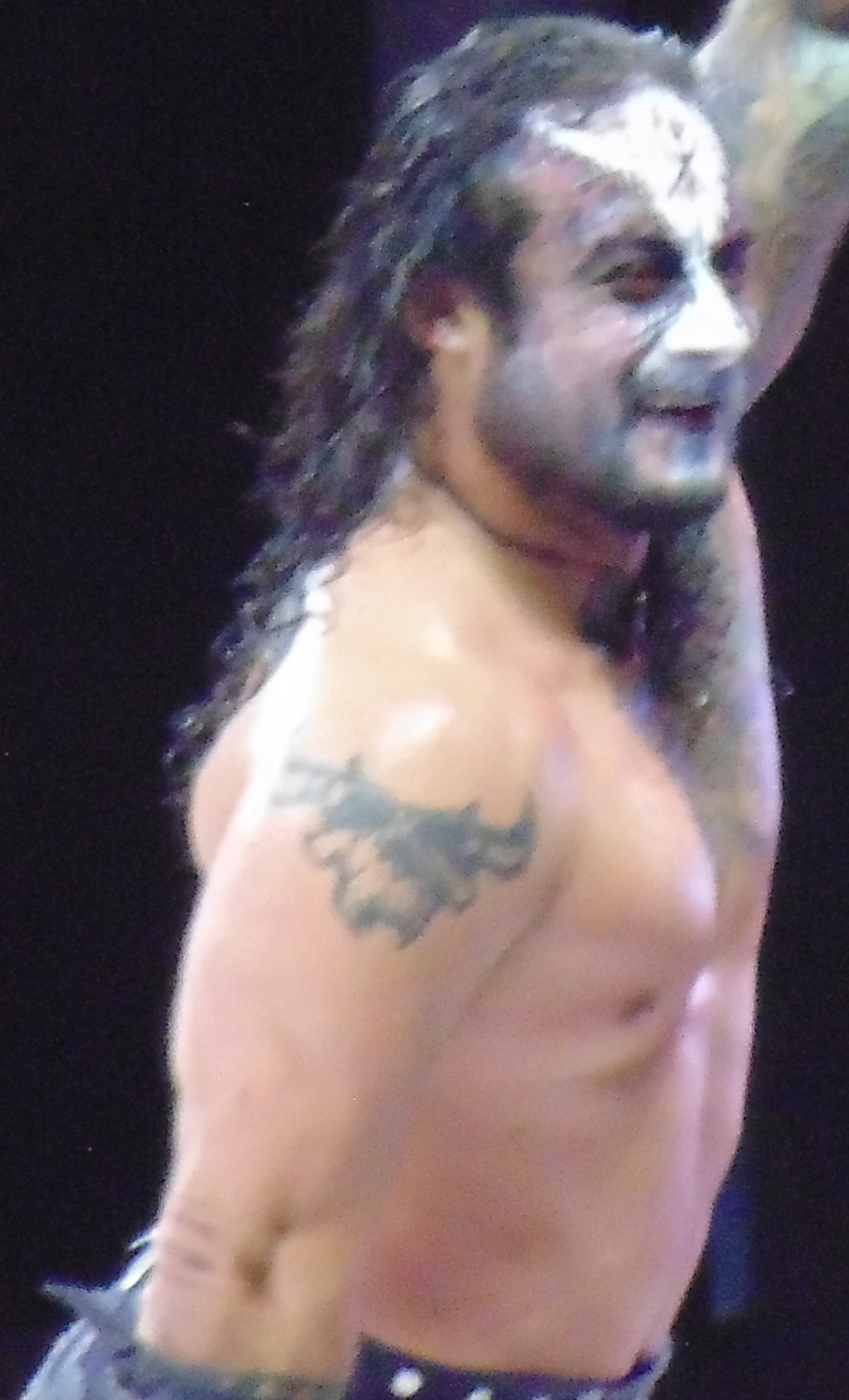
- Mecha Wolf in 2026

Personal information
- Born: John Jesús Yurnet Ruiz; June 21, 1987 (age 39) Hormigueros, Puerto Rico

Professional wrestling career
- Ring name(s): Hammett; Jesús De León; Jesus Yurnet; John Yurnet; Mecha-Balam; Mecha Wolf; Mecha Wolf 450; Mr. 450; GT Vega
- Billed height: 5 ft 8 in (1.73 m)
- Billed weight: 182 lb (83 kg)
- Billed from: Wolves den
- Trained by: Invader III; Cruzz
- Debut: 2004

John Jesús Yurnet (born June 21, 1987), better known by his ring name Mecha Wolf, is a Puerto Rican professional wrestler and professional wrestling trainer. He is signed to WWE, where he performs on their sister promotion Lucha Libre AAA Worldwide (AAA). He is best known for his work in World Wrestling Council (WWC), where he is a former two-time holder of the WWC Universal Heavyweight Championship.

He has also worked for prominent promotions such as Impact Wrestling, Lucha Libre AAA Worldwide (AAA), Consejo Mundial de Lucha Libre (CMLL), The Crash, WWE (in their NXT and 205 Live brands), Juggalo Championship Wrestling (JCW), and the National Wrestling Alliance, where he is a two-time former World Tag Team Champion.

== Career ==
A fan of heavy metal music, Yurnet adopted the ring name "Hammett" as a homage to Metallica's lead guitarist Kirk Hammett. Upon completing his training with Johhny Rivera (also known as Invader No. 3 from his days as an active wrestler), He started his career working on the independent circuit of Puerto Rico, in promotions including Xtreme Wrestling Entertainment (XWE) among others. He later entered the New Wrestling Stars (NWS) in 2005 and was a member of the stable "HP" with Ash, Livewire, and, later on, Stefano. Hammett became NWS's first Junior Heavyweight Champion after winning a tournament on March 26, 2006 but, after having problems with the company, soon vacated the title and left for the International Wrestling Association (IWA). During this time Hammett continued wearing the title until the New Wrestling Stars requested it back.

Hammett soon became IWA's Junior Heavyweight Champion just two weeks later in Bayamón, Puerto Rico defeating champion Blitz. During his time with IWA, Hammet teamed with both Tommy Diablo and Carlitos in tag matches before leaving IWA to return to the NWS. Where on August 13, 2006 in Aguadilla, Puerto Rico, Hammet made his first appearance after the match between Bolo The Red Bulldog and William De La Vega, running in through the crowd. Hammet helped out De La Vega, Noriega, and Sabu Kid clear the ring of his former HP teammates.

The appearance was a one-off, however, as Hammett left the company again the next day to enter the World Wrestling Council (WWC). While in WWC, Hammett feuded with Brent Dail, Alex Montalvo and Eli Rodriguez. Hammet soon won WWC's Junior Heavyweight title, becoming the first wrestler in Puerto Rican Wrestling to win the triple-crown by winning the junior heavyweight titles of the three main Puerto Rican companies (at that time) . He also had feuds with wrestlers like Rick Stanley, William De La Vega, BJ, Rico Suave and Tim Arson whom he wrestled for the WWC tag team championships. In his feud with BJ he became the WWC Television Champion on March 1, 2008, and held it for two weeks before dropping it back to BJ. By September 2008, he decided to leave WWC and joined Windy City Pro Wrestling. On February 19, 2010, he defeated Steve Boz to win the Lucha Chicago Championship, In 2014, Mr 450 traveled to Japan where he saw action on Michinoku Pro Wrestling and Pro Wrestling Zero1. After Japan, he went back to the United States to wrestle in Fight The World Wrestling where he won the FTW World Championship. He later came back to Puerto Rico in October 2014 to World Wrestling League event Inssurection where he faced El Sensacional Carlitos, this match being named The Match Of The Year. Later that November they faced each other again.

=== International exposition of the Universal Heavyweight Championship (2015–2016) ===
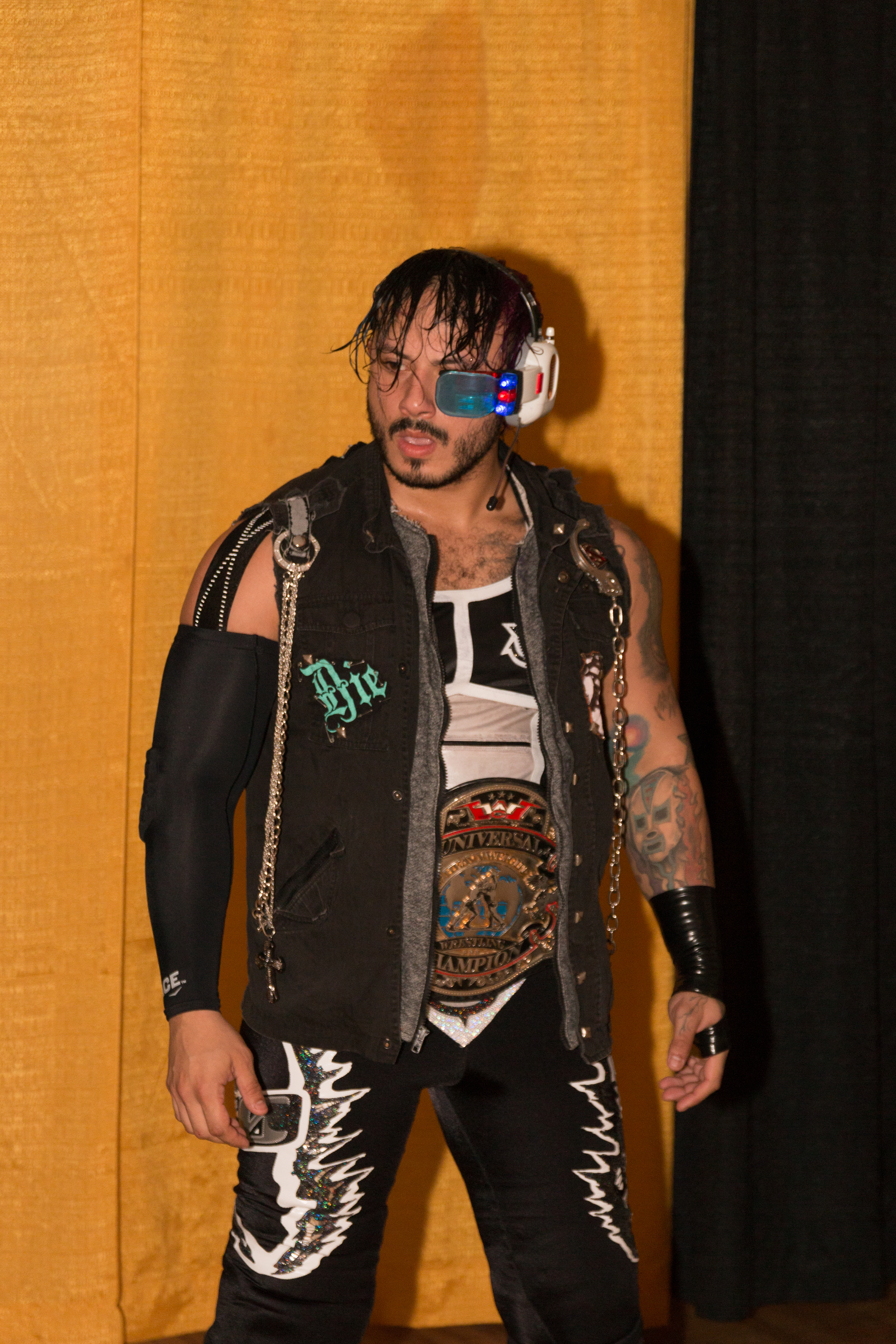
Mr. 450 during his tour as Universal Champion.

He returned to WWC on April 4, 2015 to challenge for the Universal World Heavyweight Championship in the main event of Camino a la Gloria, but the match ended without a clear winner and Carlos "Chicano" Cotto retained. The series between both peaked in a cage match, which Hammet won to become the Universal Heavyweight Champion. At Aniversario 2015, he defeated Carly Colón to retain. During his reign as champion, Hammet would wear the belt in his appearances outside of Puerto Rico, carrying it with him in matches throughout the independent circuit of the United States and Canada. In an interview with WrestleZone, he explained that his intention was to give the title the foreign exposition that it had when Carlos Colón and Dory Funk feuded over it in the NWA territories and that he wanted people to feel "[that] this guy is going over to Japan with the belt and representing the island there. [...] This guy is going to Ecuador and he's representing there." On October 16, 2015, he debuted in Caution Wrestling Federation (CWF) by successfully defending the Universal Heavyweight Championship against masked luchador Zoom Driver, marking the first time that the title had been on the line in Mexican territory. On March 5, 2016, he lost the Universal Championship against Carlito.

On August 7, 2016, Mr. 450 defeated Ricochet to win the Wrestling Superstar World Submission Lucha Championship in Chile. In November 2016, Yurnet debuted the parallel masked character of Mecha-Balam, a cyborg take on Lince Dorado's Balam character that was given a backstory tying both (as a mecha version improved through "dark science") by designer Chris Parks of Pale Horse Lucha.

On his first match since his injury he defeated El León Apollo in WWC, and Chicano the next day. On April 16, 2017, Yurnet defeated Ray González in a match to crown a new WWC Universal Heavyweight Champion. Despite heavily promoting a changing of the guard in their television programming, WWC changed the ongoing storyline the following day so that veteran Thunder (Reynaldo Rodríguez) would win the title in a three-way match, reportedly concerned with his schedule. Yurnet was critical of the last minute decision, which he labeled "WWClogic" and left the promotion in the same card. Instead, he resumed his international tours with more appearances in The Crash, RONIN, WrestleCircus and the AAW's XI Anniversary.

=== WWE (2014–2016) ===
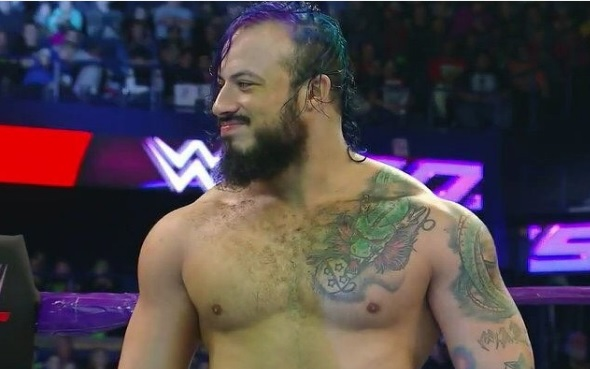
John Yurnet moments before his match against Mustafa Ali

In December 2014, Mr. 450 Hammett wrestled Bull Dempsey as Jesús De León on an episode of NXT. On July 22, 2015, he made a second appearance on NXT losing to Baron Corbin in less than 5 seconds. On August 19, he made another NXT appearance in an eight-man tag team match, teaming with Jesse Sorensen, Aaron Solow and Jonny Vandal losing to Enzo Amore, Colin Cassady and The Hype Bros (Zack Ryder and Mojo Rawley).

On July 12, 2016, Yurnet (under his actual name) was announced as one of the alternates of the Cruiserweight Classic (CWC), a group of wrestlers tasked to replace anyone in the official pool that was injured or failed to make the established weight limit of 205 pounds, but did not compete in the tournament. Wrestling as "Jesús Yurnet", he returned to WWE NXT on the September 28, 2016, episode, teaming with Johnathan Cruz in a losing effort against The Authors of Pain. On the December 27 episode of WWE 205 Live, he wrestled in a losing effort to Mustafa Ali, under his real name (John Yurnet).

=== Return to WWL (2017–2018) ===
Mr. 450 (left) as part of La Junta along Willie Mack (center) and Konnan (right).

His falling out with WWC facilitated a return to WWL, which had entered into an association with The Crash after he left. Yurnet was included in a storyline where Konnan had manipulated then general manager Dennis Rivera and recruited presidential assistant Manny Ferno in order to complete a hostile takeover of the promotion, imposing a foreign administration exemplified by a heel stable called La Junta de Control (lit. "The Control Board", a reference to PROMESA), being recruited along Willie Mack in a bid to dethrone WWL World Heavyweight Champion Mr. Big (Miguel Maldonado) and replace him with a corporate champion. On May 13, 2017, he made his first appearance as part of the invaders, witnessing the betrayal of both against president Savio Vega (Juan Rivera), but refusing to participate in the attack despite receiving direct orders to do so. In the main event of the card, Yurnet was sabotaged twice by the special referee and long-time tag team partner of the incumbent, Blitz (Freddy Lozada), allowing them to succeed in their collective effort to retain after brawling with the official. The result infuriated Konnan who confronted him, only for Yurnet to quit La Junta and in turn be jumped by the heels. After the faces made the save, he was welcomed back into the Westside Mafia and formed an alliance with new arrivals "El Judas" Mike Mendoza (Víctor Ortiz) and Ángel "Fashion" Pérez.

On June 3, 2017, Yurnet was involved in a confrontation with Ferno (now the COO of La Junta) and his Puro Macho stable, which led to that faction intervening in his titular match later in the event and forcing a double disqualification. Despite also being attacked, Big and Blitz (collectively known as Los Rabiosos) declined to join forces with the Westside Mafia. Later that month, Yurnet unveiled a new facet of his Mr. 450 character, named "MechaWolf". The change involved the confection of an original cyborg-wolf themed indumentary, which replaced assorted masks (depicting characters such as Iron Maiden's Eddie the Head) and the Dragon Ball-inspired scouter accessory that had remained a vestigial element from his previous gimmick.

On July 15, 2017, Yurnet defeated Joseph Cruz "J.C." Navarro in a first contenders match and stole the WWL World Heavyweight Championship belt, also turning on the Westside Mafia (while wearing the Mecha-Balam outfit) and insulting Johhny Rivera. Afterward he would carry the title in his foreign presentations, beginning the following day at the Arena Nacionalista. On July 22, 2017, Yurnet announced on his Twitter account that he was changing his ring name to "The Mecha Wolf", dropping Mr. 450 and making the aspects the June gimmick change more predominant. This was followed by another appearance with the belt in Wrestling Superstar's (WS) Lucha Conquest event, held at Orlando, Florida.

Big was given the original belt to replace the stolen one and defended it in a three-way against the latest contenders that ended without a winner, after which Wolf took that one as well and self-proclaimed himself the "Undisputed WWL World Heavyweight Champion". Although the promotion entered a forced hiatus after hurricane Maria passed over Puerto Rico in September 2017, 450 retained the unofficial WWL World Heavyweight Championship by defeating Skalibur on October 29, this as part of the 28th Anniversary of the Arena Nacionalista in Mexicali.

=== The Crash and WWL World Heavyweight Champion (2018) ===
On February 24 Mecha Wolf was announced as the number one contender for Star Roger's CWA Championship. The match was at “Batalla por el oro” on March 24 but was unsuccessful in winning the title after interference of WWL's Mr Big. Yurnet would then go on to defeat Mr Big for the official WWL World Heavyweight Championship. Wrestling in Mexico for The Crash on August 4, 450 and Garza jr. defeated WWE's Tyler Bate and Trent Seven in a tag team match. On August 18, Yurnet would wrestle his first match at Panama for the wrestling promotion Global Wrestling Evolution and became the first person to do a 450 splash at Panama in a wrestling show after delivering his signature Spirt Bomb. Yurnet then issued a challenge to the GWE world champion Ion Recalde. After various successful titles defenses against the likes of Mr Big, Morgan and BJ, on September 30, Yurnet defended successfully the WWL World Heavyweight Championship against Mike Mendoza and BJ in a triple threat match. Yurnet was supposed to defend the WWL Heavyweight Championship on October 27 in a triple threat match involving Angel Fashion and BJ but due to a flight delay he couldn't make it to the show, WWL management decided to continue with the title match and make it a singles match between Angel Fashion and BJ thus stripping Yurnet from the WWL Heavyweight Championship ending his reign at 190 days. Yurnet announced his departure from the company that same night.

=== Mexico and the US (2018–present) ===
At Mysteriomania: Tributo al Mesias, Yurnet won the NGCW Florida Grand Championship after defeating Juventud Guerrera. At Christmas Showdown Yurnet defeated Ricky Banderas after a DDT onto a chair. Afternoon, Yurnet was joined by the Westside Mafia in confronting new CWA World Heavyweight Champion, Justin Dynamite. Yurnet was the runner up for wrestler of the year from PRWrestling. Yurnet won Puerto Rico wrestler of the year and also the match of the year awards from LWprowrestling (Last Word on Pro Wrestling). On March 19 wrestling for Pro Wrestling 2.0 at Shamrock Showdown, Yurnet defeated Angel Fashion to become Pro Wrestling 2.0 Universal Cruiserweight Champion for the first time. Thanks to the alliance of The Crash and Consejo Mundial de Lucha Libre Mecha Wolf 450 was announced to be paired with Adam Brooks of The Crash for a tag team match against the Chávez brothers, Niebla Roja and Ángel de Oro in the Mexico Arena. On May 24 Mecha Wolf alongside Bestia 666 as La Rebelión Amarilla defeated Rey Fenix and Penta el 0M for The Crash Tag Team Championship. On June 28 Mecha Wolf alongside the rest of La Rebelión Amarilla stable (Rey Horus and Bestia 666) make his debut in the United Kingdom wrestling for Fight Club: Pro. Yurnet was part of team world in the Grand Prix 2019 for CMLL in a losing effort.

== Personal life ==
In April 2017, Yurnet and then-girlfriend Lindsay Snow were involved in a public disagreement, which led to her pressing domestic violence charges. He denied any physicality and cited that there were multiple witnesses to back his stance. After the accusations were used against him by fellow wrestler Mustafa Ali, Yurnet commented publicly on the situation and accused Snow of being unfaithful with another wrestler, Shannon Moore, an argument supported by the latter's ex-wife, Julie Youngberg. In August 2017, the case was dismissed due to absence of evidence.

In 2026, further domestic violence accusations were made by another partner of Yurnet. Ex-girlfriend Yazmin Osorno asserted that they met in 2015, whilst she was working for AAA, that she allowed Yurnet to live at her residence whilst he recovered from an injury, and that she fell pregnant. According to Osorno, she broke up with him after he showed up to her ultrasound drunk & having been dropped off by a new girlfriend, as he was again months later when he dropped by to pick up his belongings & beat her into a bloody state that almost caused her to miscarry. Osonro claims to not hold the incident against him, but rather to simply be seeking promised-and-unpaid child support.

== References in popular culture ==
The Legend of Mecha Wolf – A children's dual-language (English and Spanish) coloring book written by Paul Barile and illustrated by José E Ledezma tells the origin story of the character published in October 2023 by Lexographic Press ISBN 9781958156117

== Championships and accomplishments ==
- Promociones EMW
  - EMW World Middleweight Championship (1 time, current)
- Chicago Style Wrestling
  - CSW Heavyweight Championship (1 time)
  - CSW Metra Division Championship (2 times)
- Espiritu Pro Wrestling Dojo
  - EPWD Championship (1 time)
- Dreamwave Wrestling
  - Dreamwave Alternative Championship (1 time)
- Fight the World Wrestling
  - FTW Heavyweight Championship (1 time)
- Galli Lucha Libre
  - Galli Indiscutible Championship (1 time)
- Independent Championship Wrestling Alliance
  - ICW Pure Crown X Championship (1 time)
  - 1st Grand Prix Cup – with Team Puerto Rico (Savio Vega, El Nazareno, Chicano Cotto, Mr. Big and Roxxy)
- International Wrestling Association
  - IWA Junior Heavyweight Championship (1 time)
- Juggalo Championship Wrestling
  - JCW Battle Royal Championship (1 time)
- Lucha Chicago Championship
  - LCPW Heavyweight Championship (1 time)
- Lucha Maniaks
  - Lucha Maniaks Tag Team Championship (1 time) – with Bestia 666
- Mucha Lucha Atlanta
  - MLA Heavyweight Championship (1 time)
- National Wrestling Alliance
  - NWA World Tag Team Championship (2 times) – with Bestia 666
- New Generation Championship Wrestling
  - NGCW Heavyweight Championship (1 time)
  - NGCW Florida Grand Championship (1 time)
  - International Cup (2018)
- New Wrestling Stars
  - NWS Cruiserweight Championship (1 time)
- NWA Signature Pro
  - NWA/FUW Flash Championship (1 time)
- Pacific Coast Wrestling
  - PCW Light Heavyweight Championship (1 time)
  - PCW Light Heavyweight Title Tournament (2016)
- Pro Wrestling 2.0
  - PW 2.0 Universal Cruiserweight Championship (1 time)
- Pro Wrestling Blitz
  - PWB No Limits Championship (1 time)
- Pro Wrestling Illustrated
  - PWI ranked him #200 of the top 500 singles wrestlers in the PWI 500 in 2016
  - Ranked #12 of the top 100 tag teams in the PWI Tag Team 100 in 2023 with Bestia 666
- The Crash Lucha Libre
  - The Crash Tag Team Championship (2 time) – with Bestia 666
- TNT Extreme Wrestling
  - TNT Tag Team Championship (1 time) – with Bestia 666
- Wrestling And Respect Wrestling
  - WAR Tag Team Championship (1 time) – with Marshe Rockett
- World Wrestling Council
  - WWC Universal Heavyweight Championship (2 times)
  - WWC Television Championship (1 time)
  - WWC World Junior Heavyweight Championship (2 times)
- Wrestling Superstar
  - WS World Submission Lucha Championship (1 time)
- World Wrestling League
  - WWL World Heavyweight Championship (1 time)
  - WWL Americas Championship (1 time)

== See also ==
- Professional wrestling in Puerto Rico
