= Bestia 666 =

Mexican professional wrestler

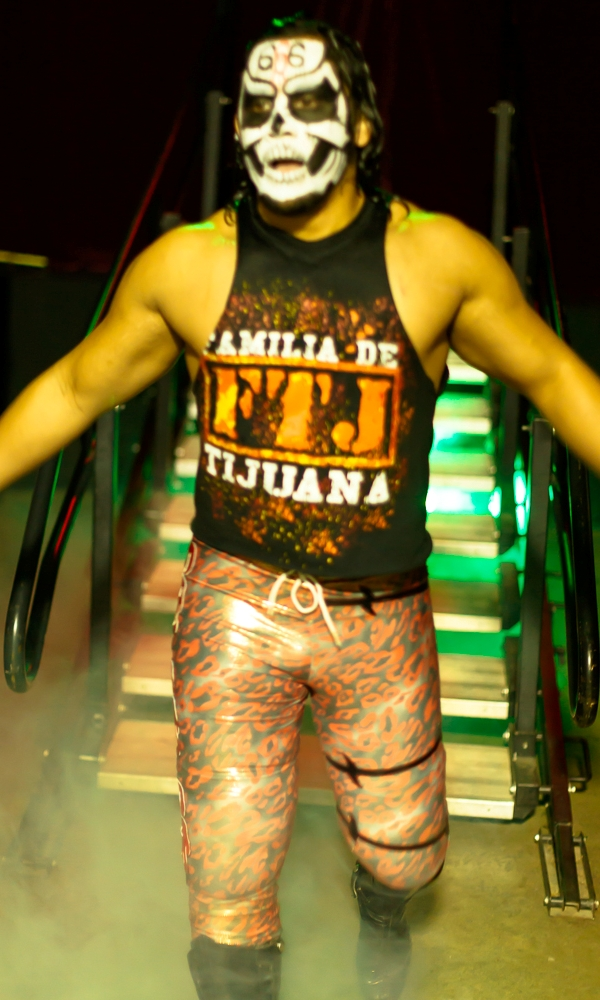
- Bestia 666 at PWR on January 27, 2013

Personal information
- Born: Leornardo Carrera Lizarraga; May 14, 1989 (age 37) Tijuana, Baja California, Mexico
- Family: Damián 666 (father)

Professional wrestling career
- Ring name(s): Bestia 666; Bestia; Leo
- Billed height: 1.78 m (5 ft 10 in)
- Billed weight: 95 kg (209 lb)
- Trained by: Damián 666; El Hijo del Gladiador; Skayde
- Debut: 2009

Leornardo Carrera Lizarraga (born May 14, 1989) is a Mexican professional wrestler, better known by the ring name Bestia 666. He is currently working for various promotions across Mexico, while also performing in the United States for several California-based promotions. Bestia 666's father is professional wrestler Leonardo Carrera, who performs as Damián 666 and who inspired his son's current character. He is the current leader of La Rebelión Amarilla. He is a two time NWA World Tag Team Champion.

== Early life ==
Carrera was born to Leonardo Carrera Gómez and Guadalupe Lizarraga on May 14, 1989, in Tijuana, Baja California, Mexico. He studied first in Universidad de las Américas Puebla in San Andrés Cholula, Puebla, but after having some problems with the university's teachers, he switched over to Universidad Autónoma de Nuevo León in Monterrey to study sports science. While studying, Carrera was looking for a career in American football, playing both as a running back and a defensive back, however, he was forced to give up the sport after nagging injuries started to affect his running. Carrera then decided to follow in the footsteps of his father Leonardo, better known as Damián 666, and started training in lucha libre or professional wrestling in Arena México under his father, El Hijo del Gladiador and Skayde.

== Professional wrestling career ==
=== Los Perros del Mal (2009–2012) ===
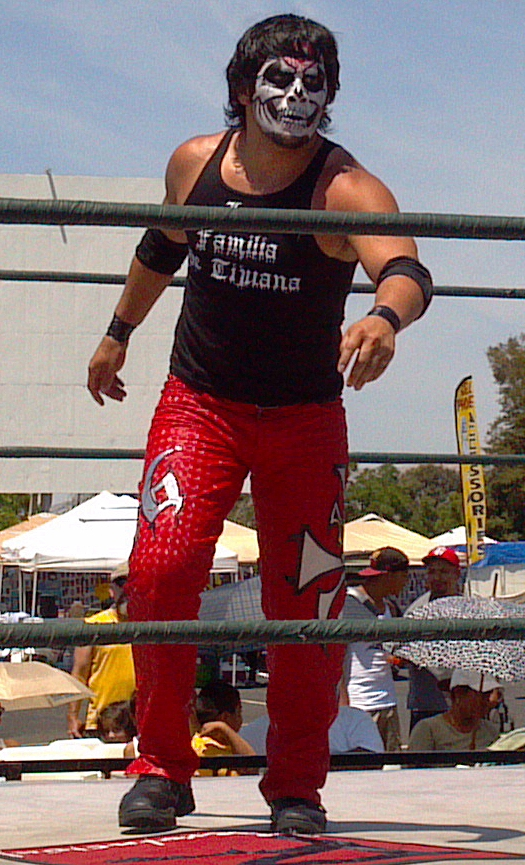
Bestia 666 at a PWR event on June 16, 2012

In July 2009, Carrera made his debut for his father's home promotion, Perros del Mal Producciones. Wanting to start from scratch, he came up with the character of Leo, a masked técnico (fan favorite) dancer and one half of the tag team Los Strippers with Riveiro. The tag team achieved only limited success, often working opening matches at events. On June 6, 2010, Carrera took part in Perros del Mal's storyline invasion of Mexico's biggest promotion, AAA. For the appearance he was repackaged as Bestia 666 with a character and face paint inspired by Damián 666, in the process revealing the relation between the two. Under his new character, Bestia 666 was quickly accepted into the rudo (villainous) stable Los Perros del Mal, which also included the likes of Damián 666, Halloween, L.A. Park, X-Fly and the group's leader, El Hijo del Perro Aguayo. With his tag team with Riveiro behind him, Bestia 666 began regularly teaming with X-Fly and on September 4 the two entered a tournament to determine the first ever Independent Wrestling League (IWL) Tag Team Champions. On November 28, Bestia 666 and X-Fly defeated Las Hermanos Trauma (Trauma I and Trauma II) in a tournament final to become the first IWL Tag Team Champions. A week later Perros del Mal Producciones crowned their first ever champion, the Perros del Mal Extremo Champion; the nine-way match, which also included Bestia 666, was won by his tag team partner and best friend X-Fly. On January 15, 2011, Bestia 666 made his wrestling debut for AAA, teaming with Damián 666 and Halloween as a member of both Los Perros del Mal and La Sociedad, in a six-man tag team match, where they were defeated by Los Psycho Circus (Monster Clown, Murder Clown and Psycho Clown). Bestia 666 also represented Los Perros del Mal in International Wrestling Revolution Group (IWRG), where he, Damián 666 and X-Fly unsuccessfully challenged for the IWRG Intercontinental Trios Championship on four separate occasions between January and July. On July 24, Perros del Mal Producciones crowned their first ever Light Heavyweight Champion in a six-way match, where Bestia 666 ended up defeating Black Fire, Peligro, Pesadilla, Tony Rivera and Zumbi to win the title. During IWRG's La Jaula de la Muerte ("The Cage of Death") show on August 28, Bestia 666, Damián 666 and X-Fly defeated Los Psycho Circus, Los Temerarios (Black Terry, Durok and Machin) and Los Villanos (Kortiz, Ray Mendoza Jr. and Villano IV) in a steel cage match to win the IWRG Intercontinental Trios Championship. On October 5, IWL announced that since Bestia 666 and X-Fly had defended the IWL Tag Team Championship without the promotion's authorization, they would no longer recognize the title, which would be replaced by the new IWL International Tag Team Championship. Later that month, Bestia was invited for a tryout with WWE, during the promotion's tour of Mexico. Bestia appeared on the October 21 edition of WWE SmackDown as one of Cody Rhodes' "baggers", taking an RKO from Randy Orton. On November 13, Bestia 666 lost the Perros del Mal Light Heavyweight Championship to Super Nova in a six-way elimination match, which also included Eterno, Diva Salvaje, Golden Magic and Tony Rivera. On December 1, Bestia, Damián and X-Fly lost the IWRG Intercontinental Trios Championship to Los Capos Jr. (Cien Caras Jr., El Hijo de Máscara Año 2000 and Máscara Año 2000 Jr.). On March 12, 2012, Bestia 666, along with his father, Halloween and X-Fly, announced that he was quitting Los Perros del Mal.

=== United States (2011–present) ===
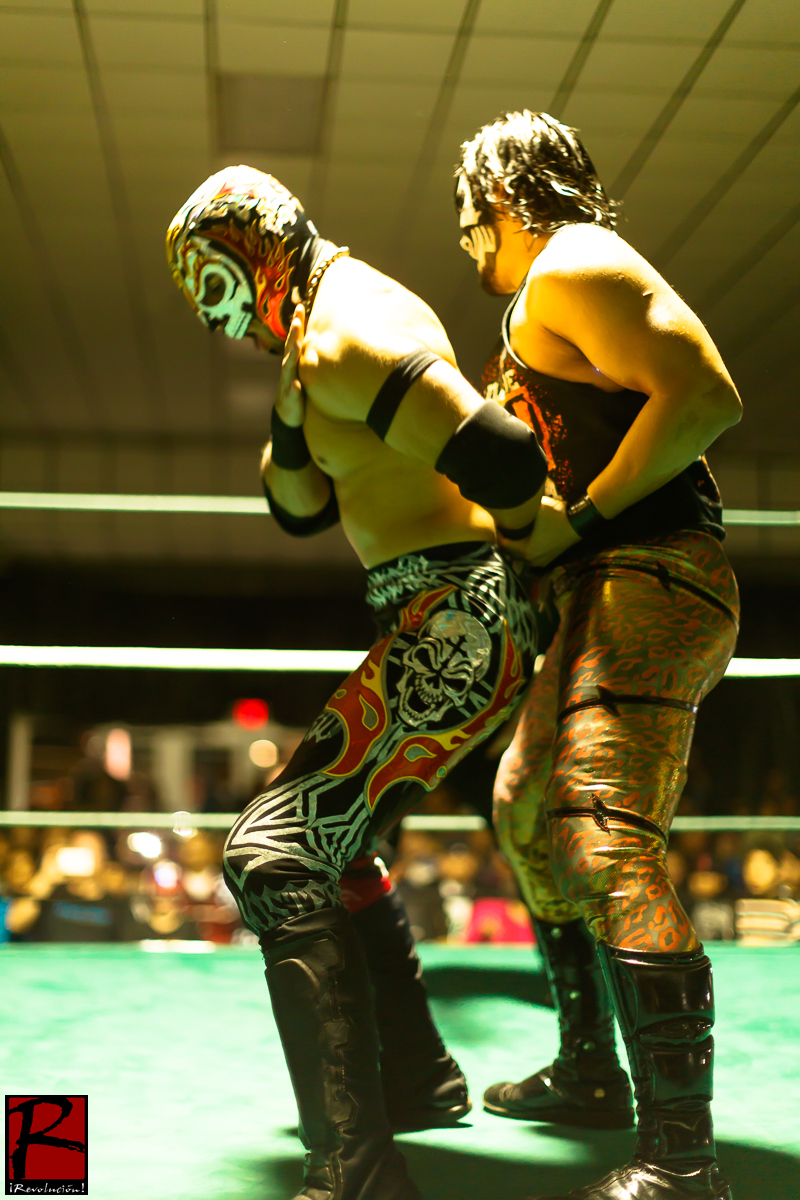
Bestia 666 wrestling El Hijo de Rey Misterio II at a PWR event on January 27, 2013

On June 3, 2011, Carrera made his professional wrestling debut in the United States, when he, working without his signature face paint and billed simply as Bestia, took part in the tapings of Urban Wrestling Federation's (UWF) first three pay-per-views at the Hammerstein Ballroom in New York City, New York. On the first PPV, titled First Blood, Bestia defeated Facade in a first round match of a tournament to determine the inaugural UWF Champion. At the tapings of the third PPV, titled Street King, Bestia was eliminated from the four–way tournament finals by Homicide. On the fourth PPV, Thug Assassins, which premiered January 22, 2012, Bestia defeated Masada.

In early 2012, Bestia 666, along with his father, began making regular appearances for California-based promotions Empire Wrestling Federation (EWF) and MexPW. On June 29, Bestia 666 took part in Extreme Rising promotion's first event in Corona, New York, defeating Pesadilla. On November 17, Bestia wrestled on Extreme Rising's first internet pay-per-view, Remember November, defeating Facade. He returned to the promotion a year later on December 28, 2013, teaming with his father in a tag team match, where they defeated Pesadilla and Super Crazy. Also in 2013, Bestia and his father began wrestling for California-based Vendetta Pro Wrestling. In his first appearance on March 2, he suffered a defeat at the hands of El Hijo de Rey Misterio II in what was dubbed a "Lucha Libre Legacy" match. On June 22, Bestia and his father unsuccessfully challenged Pink Mink, Inc. (Matt Carlos and Rik Luxury) for the Unified Tag Team Championship in a three-way match, which also included the Ballard Brothers (Shane and Shannon). This led to an immediate rematch, where the two were victorious via countout over Pink Mink, Inc., who, however, retained their title.

On July 24, 2015, Bestia 666 made his debut for Global Force Wrestling (GFW) at the promotion's first Amped television taping, teaming with Blood Eagle and Steve Pain in a six-man tag team match, where they were defeated by Misterioso Jr., Phoenix Star and Zokre.

In March 2016, Bestia 666 debuted for Lucha Underground.

He made his first appearance for Major League Wrestling on MLW Fusion 68 in a singles match, defeating Mance Warner.

=== La Familia de Tijuana (2012–2017) ===
After quitting Los Perros del Mal, Bestia 666, Damián 666, Halloween, Super Nova and X-Fly announced on March 14, 2012, that they were forming a new group of independent wrestlers, named La Familia de Tijuana. The group was much like Los Perros del Mal, with the exception that they were not looking to form their own promotion. It was also revealed that originally only Bestia and his father were looking to get out of Los Perros del Mal, but the others joined them after learning of their intentions. On March 22, Bestia 666 defeated Trauma I to win the IWRG Junior de Juniors Championship. On March 29, IWRG was officially announced as La Familia de Tijuana's new home promotion. On July 1, Bestia 666 lost the IWRG Junior de Juniors Championship to El Hijo de Máscara Año 2000. On February 1, 2013, Bestia 666 defeated El Hijo de Rey Misterio II to win Promociones Rojas' vacant WWO World Cruiserweight Championship. In December 2013, Bestia was invited to take part in another WWE tryout.

== Championships and accomplishments ==
- Azteca Karate Extremo
  - AKE Cruiserweight Championship (1 time)
- The Crash
  - The Crash Cruiserweight Championship (1 time)
  - The Crash Tag Team Championship (2 time) - with Mecha Wolf 450
- Independent/International Wrestling League
  - IWL Tag Team Championship (1 time) – with X-Fly
- International Wrestling Revolution Group
  - IWRG Intercontinental Trios Championship (1 time) – with Damián 666 and X-Fly
  - IWRG Junior de Juniors Championship (1 time)
- Lucha Maniaks
  - Lucha Maniaks Tag Team Championship (1 time, inaugural) - with Mecha Wolf 450
  - Lucha Maniaks Tag Team Championship Tournament (2021) – with Mecha Wolf 450
- National Wrestling Alliance
  - NWA World Tag Team Championship (2 times) - with Mecha Wolf 450
- Perros del Mal Producciones
  - Perros del Mal Light Heavyweight Championship (1 time)
- Promociones Rojas
  - WWO World Cruiserweight Championship (1 time)
- Pro Wrestling Illustrated
  - PWI ranked him #210 of the top 500 wrestlers in the PWI 500 in 2015
  - Ranked #12 of the top 100 tag teams in the PWI Tag Team 100 in 2023 with Mecha Wolf 450
- Pro Wrestling Revolution
  - PWR Junior Heavyweight Championship (1 time)
- TNT Extreme Wrestling
  - TNT Tag Team Championship (1 time) – with Mecha Wolf 450
- World Pro Wrestling
  - WPW Cruiserweight Championship (2 time)
- Vendetta Pro Wrestling
  - Match of the Year Vendetty Award (2014) vs. Extreme Tiger vs. Little Cholo
- RGR Lucha Libre
  - RGR Middleweight Championship (1 time)
- WildKat Pro Wrestling
  - WildKat Revolution Championship (1 time)
  - Revolution Royal Rumble (2014)
- WrestleCore
  - WrestleCore Infinity Championship (1 time)
- World Wrestling Association
  - WWA Tag Team Championship (1 time, final) – with Damián 666

== Luchas de Apuestas record ==
Winner (wager)	Loser (wager)	Location	Event	Date	Notes
Bestia 666 (hair)	Jack Evans (hair)	Tijuana, Baja California	The Crash 6th Anniversary show	November 4, 2017	(Note: This was a Tables, Chairs and Lamps match)
Bestia 666 (hair)	Garza Jr. (hair)	Tijuana, Baja California	The Crash VII Aniversario	November 3, 2018	
