= The Crash Heavyweight Championship =

Mexican professional wrestling heavyweight championship

- The championship belt, with depictions of Perro Aguayo Jr. and Eddie Guerrero on the left and right side plates respectively

Details
- Promotion: The Crash Lucha Libre
- Date established: November 4, 2017
- Current champion: Andrade El Idolo
- Date won: October 3, 2025
Statistics
- First champion: Rey Mysterio
- Longest reign: Bandido (713 days)
- Shortest reign: Austin Theory (63 days)
- Oldest champion: Rey Mysterio (42 years, 328 days)
- Youngest champion: Austin Theory (21 years, 212 days)
- Heaviest champion: Willie Mack (130 kg (290 lb))
- Lightest champion: El Hijo del Vikingo (71 kg (157 lb))

The Crash Heavyweight Championship (Spanish: Campeonato de Peso Completo de The Crash) is a professional wrestling championship used in the Mexican lucha libre promotion The Crash Lucha Libre based in Tijuana, Baja California. It is the top male championship of the promotion, with both The Crash Cruiserweight Championship and The Crash Junior Championship considered secondary. Rey Mysterio defeated Penta el 0M, La Máscara and Rush in four-way match to become the inaugural champion at The Crash VII Aniversario on November 4, 2017. The current champion is Andrade El Idolo. He defeated DMT Azul on October 3, 2025.

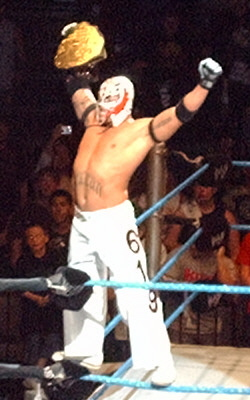
Inaugural champion Rey Mysterio

The championship is designated as a heavyweight title, which means that the championship can officially be competed for only by wrestlers weighing 105 kg (231 lb) and above, while in reality it has no lower weight limit. As it was a professional wrestling championship, the championship was not won not by actual competition, but by a scripted ending to a match determined by the bookers and match makers. (Note: Hornbaker (2016) p. 550: "Professional wrestling is a sport in which match finishes are predetermined. Thus, win–loss records are not indicative of a wrestler's genuine success based on their legitimate abilities – but on now much, or how little they were pushed by promoters") On occasion the promotion declares a championship vacant, which means there is no champion at that point in time. This can either be due to a storyline, (Note: Duncan & Will (2000) p. 271, Chapter: Texas: NWA American Tag Team Title [World Class, Adkisson] "Championship held up and rematch ordered because of the interference of manager Gary Hart") or real life issues such as a champion suffering an injury being unable to defend the championship, (Note: Duncan & Will (2000) p. 20, Chapter: (United States: 19th Century & widely defended titles – NWA, WWF, AWA, IW, ECW, NWA) NWA/WCW TV Title "Rhodes stripped on 85/10/19 for not defending the belt after having his leg broken by Ric Flair and Ole & Arn Anderson") or leaving the company. (Note: Duncan & Will (2000) p. 201, Chapter: (Memphis, Nashville) Memphis: USWA Tag Team Title "Vacant on 93/01/18 when Spike leaves the USWA.")

== Title history ==
Key
No.	Overall reign number
Reign	Reign number for the specific champion
Days	Number of days held
+	Current reign is changing daily

No.	Champion	Championship change			Reign statistics		Notes	Ref.
No.	Champion	Date	Event	Location	Reign	Days	Notes	Ref.
1	Rey Mysterio	November 4, 2017	The Crash VI Aniversario	Tijuana, Baja California	1	337	Defeated Penta el 0M, La Máscara and Rush in four-way match to become the inaugural champion.	
—	Vacated	October 7, 2018	—	—	—	—	Championship declared vacant after Rey Mysterio signed a full-time contract with WWE	
2	Willie Mack	November 3, 2018	The Crash VII Aniversario	Tijuana, Baja California	1	119	Defeated Bárbaro Cavernario, Michael Elgin and El Mesías to win the vacant championship.	
3	Austin Theory	March 2, 2019	The Crash	Tijuana, Baja California	1	63	This was a Four-way match, also involving Bárbaro Cavernario and Sansón.	
4	Rey Horus	May 4, 2019	The Crash	Tijuana, Baja California	1	203	This was a Four-way match, also involving Adam Brooks and Maxwell Jacob Friedman.	
5	Bandido	November 23, 2019	The Crash	Tijuana, Baja California	1	713	This was a three-way match that also included Marty Scurll.	
6	El Hijo del Vikingo	November 5, 2021	The Crash 10 Aniversario	Tijuana, Baja California	1	133	This was a Four-way match that also included Dragon Lee and Willie Mack.	
—	Vacated	March 18, 2022	—	—	—	—	El Hijo del Vikingo vacated the championship due to an injury.	
7	Cinta de Oro	March 18, 2022	The Crash	Tijuana, Baja California	1	111	This was a Three Way match that also included Lince Dorado and Penta El Zero M.	
8	L. A. Park	July 7, 2022	The Crash	Tijuana, Baja California	1	302	This was a Four way match that also included El Texano Jr. and Pierroth Jr.	
—	Vacated	May 5, 2023	—	—	—	—	Vacated for undocumented reasons.	
9	DMT Azul	May 5, 2023	The Crash	Tijuana, Baja California	1	883	This was a Four way match also involving Blue Demon Jr., Matt Taven, and EC3.	
10	Andrade El Idolo	October 3, 2025	The Crash	Tijuana, Baja California	1	263+		
