= Black Danger =

Mexican professional wrestler

Personal information
- Born: Tijuana, Baja California, Mexico

Professional wrestling career
- Ring names: Black Danger; Espectro; Mega Danger
- Debut: March 9, 2014

Black Danger is a masked Mexican professional wrestler. He is primarily known for working for promotions such as The Crash Lucha Libre, Lucha Libre AAA Worldwide and Major League Wrestling where he portrays a rudo ("Bad guy") wrestling character. He previously worked under the ring names Mega Danger and Espectro . Black Danger is a former holder of The Crash Junior Championship and is also a member of La Rebelión Amarilla. His real name is not a matter of public record, as is often the case with masked wrestlers in Mexico, where their private lives are kept a secret from the wrestling fans.

== Personal life ==
Black Danger is the nephew of Super Xolo and the cousin of Mirage, both wrestlers.

== Championships and accomplishments ==
- The Crash Lucha Libre

- The Crash Junior Championship (1 time)

- Promociones EMW

- EMW World Middleweight Championship (1 time, current)

== Luchas de Apuestas record ==
Winner (wager)	Loser (wager)	Location	Event	Date	Notes
Black Danger (mask)	Oráculo (mask)	Tijuana, Baja California	The Crash show	September 2, 2017	
