= Rey Horus =

Mexican professional wrestler

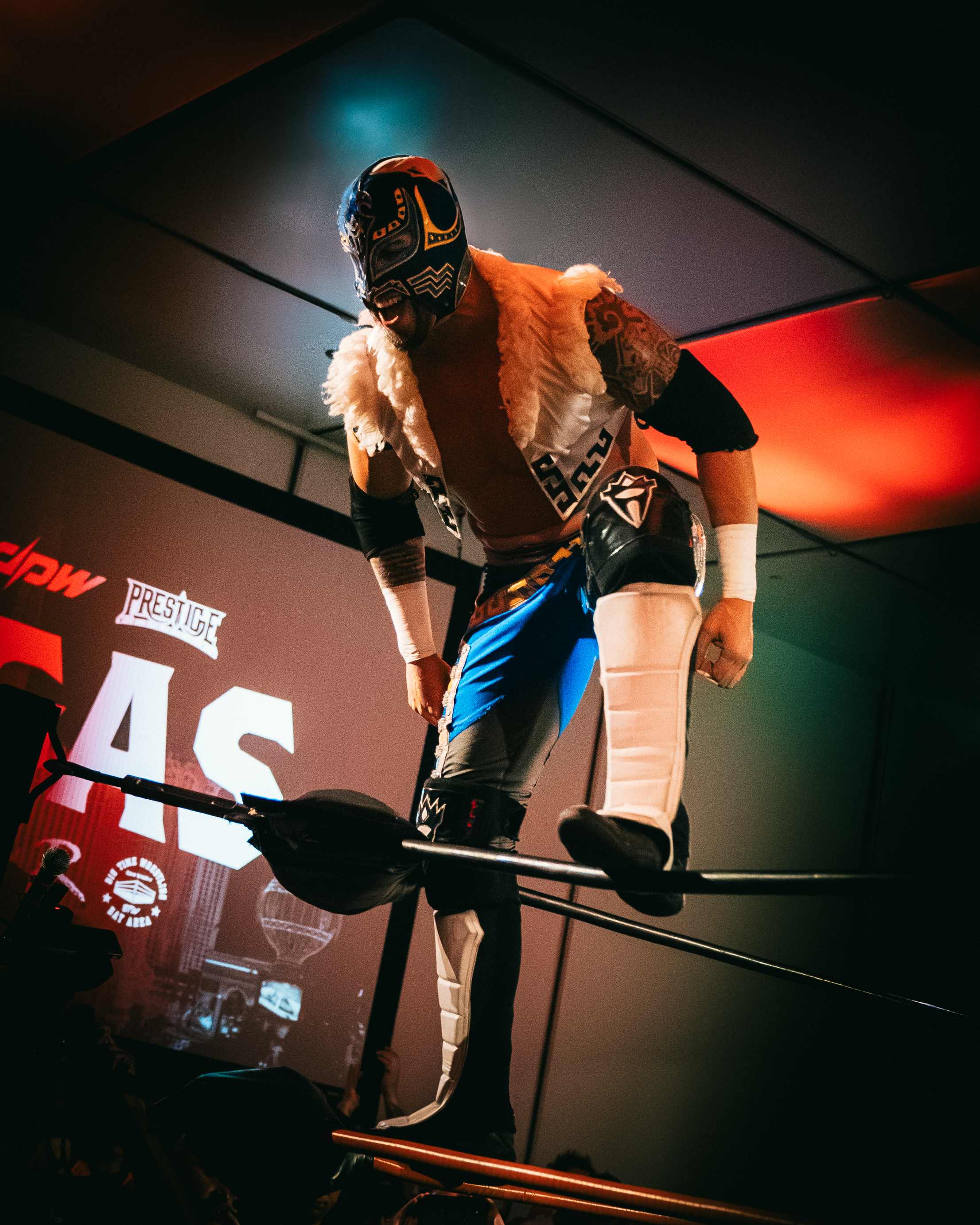
- Horus in April 2025

Personal information
- Born: Gustavo Adolfo Felix; June 24, 1984 (age 42) Tijuana, Mexico

Professional wrestling career
- Ring name(s): Aztec Dragon Jr. Dragon Azteca Jr. El Dragon Azteca Jr. El Hijo de Rey Misterio (II); Horus; Rey Horus
- Billed height: 1.70 m (5 ft 7 in)
- Billed weight: 75 kg (165 lb)
- Trained by: Rey Misterio
- Debut: September 2007

Gustavo Adolfo Felix is a Mexican professional wrestler, who currently works on the independent circuit in the United States and in Mexico under the ring name Rey Horus. He is best known tenure for Major League Wrestling (MLW) and Ring Of Honor (ROH). He was also known as the second El Hijo de Rey Misterio, Spanish for "The Son of Rey Misterio", the second wrestler under that name after the first El Hijo de Rey Misterio, though he is not from the same family. His real name is not a matter of public record, as is often the case with masked wrestlers in Mexico where their private lives are kept a secret from the professional wrestling fans.

== Professional wrestling career ==
=== Independent circuit (2007–present) ===
Horus began professional wrestling in 2007 in some Tijuana promotions.

On May 27, 2011, since the retirement of El Hijo de Rey Misterio, he was presented by both Rey Misterio Sr. and Konnan as the second El Hijo de Rey Misterio, making his debut in Tijuana. His first match as Misterio was a tournament to crown the WWA World Welterweight Champion on May 27, 2011, which Horus won. In 2014, Misterio changed his name to Rey Horus, because the original El Hijo de Rey Misterio returned to wrestling.

On March 27, 2015, Horus made his biggest appearance in the United States when he participated in the WrestleMania Weekend King of Indies tournament. Horus defeated Lil Cholo in the first round, but on March 28 he was defeated by Willie Mack in the quarter-final match. On April 6, 2015, Evolve announced Horus as A. R. Fox's substitute at Evolve 41.

On September 1, 2017, Horus entered Pro Wrestling Guerrilla's 2017 Battle of Los Angeles, losing to Rey Fenix in his first round match.

=== Lucha Underground (2016–2018) ===
In the debut episode of Lucha Underground (season one) on October 29, 2014, the opening scene featured an unnamed character being rescued from multiple attackers by the green masked Dragon Azteca. This led to Dragon Azteca mentoring the white-hooded unnamed character in lucha libre. During part one of season one's Ultima Lucha, El Dragon Azteca fought his hooded protégé to a draw at the entrance of the Temple where Lucha Underground's matches occurred. Due to the prophecy predicting El Dragon Azteca's death if he entered the Temple, the hooded man offered to go in Azteca's place to rescue Black Lotus from Dario Cueto. Azteca refused to listen, vowing that his spirit would live on after his death. Following the storyline death of Dragon Azteca, his mask was taken up by his student.

In late 2015 Horus took part in Lucha Underground first appearing in the Season 1 finale as a nameless outside spectator but at Ultima Lucha 1 took up the mask of his master and became known as Dragon Azteca Jr. In Season 2 Dragon Azteca Jr. started participating in matches and won The Lucha Underground Trios Championship along with Prince Puma & Rey Mysterio. In Season 4, he would defeat Dezmond X and King Cuerno to win the Gift of the Gods Championship, but he lost it against Marty The Moth Martinez. The serie was discontinued after season finale, Ultima Lucha Cuatro.

=== Major League Wrestling (2018–2020) ===
Horus debuted for American promotion Major League Wrestling (MLW) at their July 19, 2018 event MLW Battle Riot, in the 40-man Battle Riot match. He was unsuccessful in the match, which was won by Tom Lawlor. In September 2018, he would team with Drago to face The Lucha Brothers for the MLW World Tag Team Championship. He returned to the promotion in February 2019, when he defeated Aero Star in a singles match. Then at the following tapings, he appeared in the 2019 Battle Riot match and in another match teamed with Air Wolf in a loss to The Lucha Brothers.

=== Ring of Honor (2019–2021) ===
Rey Horus teamed with Bandido and Flamita to capture the ROH World Six-Man Tag Team Championship from Villain Enterprises (Marty Scurll, PCO, and Brody King) at Saturday Night at Center Stage in January 2020. Later that year, at Final Battle 2020, he defeated Dalton Castle in a singles match. On January 16, 2021, he unsuccessfully attempted to challenge Dragon Lee for the ROH World Television Championship.

== Championships and accomplishments ==
- The Crash Lucha Libre
  - The Crash Heavyweight Championship (1 time)
  - The Crash Cruiserweight Championship (1 time)
  - The Crash Tag Team Championship (1 time, inaugural) – with Black Boy
  - First The Crash Lucha Libre Triple Crown Champion
- Lucha Underground
  - Gift of the Gods Championship (1 time)
  - Lucha Underground Trios Championship (1 time) – with Prince Puma & Rey Mysterio
- Mucha Lucha Atlanta
  - MLA Global Championship (2 times)
- Oddity Wrestling Alliance
  - OWA Junior Heavyweight Championship (1 time)
- Pro Wrestling Illustrated
  - Ranked No. 79 of the top 500 singles wrestlers in the PWI 500 in 2020
- Ring of Honor
  - ROH World Six-Man Tag Team Championship (1 time) – with Flamita & Bandido
- Vendetta Pro Wrestling
  - Vendetta Pro Wrestling Heavyweight Championship (1 time)
- World Wrestling Association
  - WWA World Welterweight Championship (1 time)
