= The Crash Lucha Libre =

Mexican professional wrestling promotion

- Founded: 2011; 15 years ago
- Style: Lucha libre
- Headquarters: Tijuana, Baja California, Mexico
- Owner(s): Nacho de la O (owner and CEO)

The Crash Lucha Libre, also referred to as simply The Crash, is a Mexican professional wrestling promotion based in Tijuana, Baja California. The promotion largely runs its events in Tijuana, Mexico City, and Monterrey. The promotion currently has working relationships with American promotions DEFY Wrestling, Mexico's International Wrestling Revolution Group (IWRG) and Promociones MDA. The Crash previously had a working relationship with United States's Impact Wrestling, Mexico's Lucha Libre AAA Worldwide (AAA), Japan's Pro Wrestling Noah between 2016-2018, China's Oriental Wrestling Entertainment between 2017-2019 and PCW Ultra, also completely between 2016-2024. until Konnan, the intermediary between the promotions, left The Crash. On February 21, 2019 The Crash announced a partnership with Mexico's Consejo Mundial de Lucha Libre (CMLL), United States's All Elite Wrestling (AEW), Ring of Honor (ROH), and Japan's New Japan Pro-Wrestling, although that which would come to an end the following September. On August 12, 2019, Major League Wrestling and The Crash Lucha Libre announced a working relationship which ended in November of that year when Major League Wrestling would work full time with AAA.

The Crash is considered the fourth largest professional wrestling promotion in Mexico after the much older CMLL, AAA and IWRG promotions and has been touted as the fastest growing lucha libre company in the world. The promotion uses wrestlers from the Mexican and American independent circuit, notably wrestlers from Pro Wrestling Guerrilla. On April 6, 2018, The Crash held its first independently promoted show in the United States at The Sugar Mill in New Orleans, Louisiana.

== Championships ==
Championship	Current champion(s)	Reign	Date won	Location	Event	Previous champion(s)	Days held
The Crash Heavyweight Championship	D'Luxe	1	November 6, 2026	Tijuana, Baja California	The Crash XV Aniversario	Defeated Demonio Infernal,Jack Morris and Santo Jr. for the vacant title. After Andrade El Idolo vacant the title.	11+
The Crash Cruiserweight Championship	Anubis	1	November 6, 2026	Tijuana, Baja California	The Crash Anniversario XV	Defeated Champion Noisy Boy, El Mosko, Ninja Mack and Vengador in a fatal five way Table, Ladders and Chairs match for the title	12+
The Crash Junior Championship	Zonik	1	November 6, 2026	Tijuana, Baja California	The Crash XV Aniversario	Defeated Amnesia Jr., Chris Carter and Psychodelia for the junior title	12+
The Crash Tag Team Championship	El Texano Jr. and Súper Nova	1	November 6 , 2026	Tijuana, Baja California	The Crash Anniversario XV	Defeated Champions El Hijo de L.A. Park and La Park Jr., Arkangel Divino and Ultimo Maldito and Fresero Jr. and Pierroth Jr. In a fatal four-way tag team match for The Crash Tag Team Championship	12+
The Crash Women's Championship	Lady Shadow	2	February 20, 2026	Tijuana, Baja California	The Crash	Defeated the Champion Keyra & Hija de Gatubela in a Triple Threat match following a challenge after a Mixed Tag Team match in which they were involved.	271+

== See also ==
- List of professional wrestling promotions in Mexico
