= Triplemanía XXV =

2017 Lucha Libre AAA World Wide event

- Promotional poster featuring various AAA wrestlers
- Promotion: Lucha Libre AAA Worldwide
- Date: August 26, 2017
- City: Mexico City
- Venue: Arena Ciudad de México
- Attendance: 17,000

Pay-per-view chronology
← Previous; Verano de Escándalo	Next → Héroes Inmortales XI

Triplemanía chronology
← Previous; XXIV	Next → XXVI

Triplemanía XXV was a professional wrestling event produced and scripted by the Mexican professional wrestling promotion Lucha Libre AAA Worldwide (AAA). The event took place on August 26, 2017, and was held in the Arena Ciudad de México in Mexico City, Mexico. This was the sixth consecutive Triplemanía to be held at the arena. Also, the event was the 25th year in a row that AAA had held a Triplemanía show, and the 31st show held under the Triplemanía banner since 1993. The annual Triplemanía show is AAA's biggest show of the year, serving as the culmination of major storylines and feature wrestlers from all over the world competing in what has been described as AAA's version of WrestleMania or their Super Bowl event.

The main event match was the culmination of a year-long storyline that started at Triplemanía XXIV as both Psycho Clown and Dr. Wagner Jr. put their mask on the line in a Lucha de Apuestas, or bet match.

Via AAA's partnership with the U.S.-based Global Force Wrestling (GFW), wrestlers from that promotion also appeared on the card, including Andrew Everett, DJZ, Jeff Jarrett, Lashley, Moose and Rosemary.

== Production ==
=== Background ===
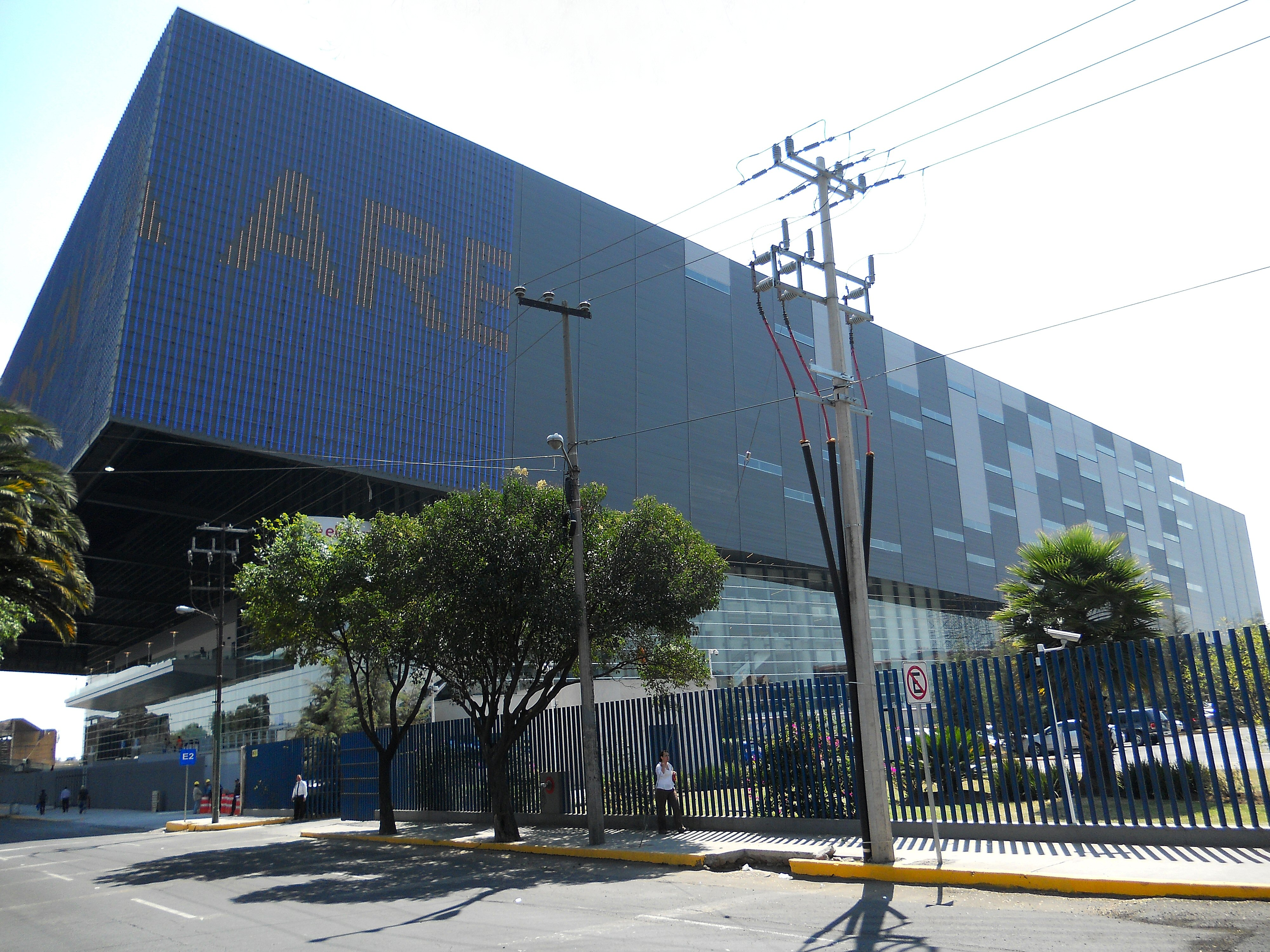
Outdoor view of the Arena Ciudad de México building.

2017 marked the 25th year since 1993 where the Mexican professional wrestling company Lucha Libre AAA Worldwide (AAA) or Triple A held their annual Triplemanía show and the 31st Triplemanía show promoted by AAA, as they held multiple Triplemanía shows over the summers of 1994 to 1997. The 2017 event took place at the Arena Ciudad de México (Mexico City Arena), an indoor arena in Azcapotzalco, Mexico City, Mexico that has a maximum capacity of 22,300 spectators. This was the sixth consecutive Triplemanía (XX, XXI, XXII, XXIII and XXIV) held at the venue. AAA's Triplemanía is their biggest show of the year, the highlight of their year, AAA's equivalent of the WWE's WrestleMania or New Japan Pro-Wrestling's Wrestle Kingdom event.

=== Storylines ===
The Triplemanía XXV show featured nine professional wrestling matches—two during the pre-show, and seven on the main card—with different wrestlers involved in pre-existing scripted feuds, plots and storylines. Wrestlers portrayed either heels (referred to as rudos in Mexico, those that portray the "bad guys") or faces (técnicos in Mexico, the "good guy" characters) as they followed a series of tension-building events, which culminated in a wrestling match or series of matches.

The main feud heading into the event was between Dr. Wagner Jr. and Psycho Clown. At Triplemanía XXIV during the Psycho Clown vs Pagano main event match, Dr. Wagner Jr. ran in to fight off Pagano's stablemates, Nicho el Millionario and Damián 666, only to turn rudo by low-blowing Psycho Clown and hitting him with a Wagner Driver. After defeating Pagano, Psycho was challenged to a Mask vs Mask match against Wagner Jr. at Triplemanía XXV, which he accepted. At the following AAA supercard, Héroes Inmortales X, Dr. Wagner Jr. defeated Psycho Clown and Pagano in a three-way match after Psycho Clown's tag team partners, Monster Clown and Murder Clown, betrayed him and threw him through a flaming table. In the following months the two competed in a series of six-man tag team matches, tag team matches, and even reluctantly teamed together at two other events, Rey de Reyes and Verano de Escándalo. At Rey de Reyes, they defeated Monster & Murder Clown (who had later attacked Wagner Jr. as well), and at Verano de Escándalo, they successfully defended their masks in a three-way tag team Lucha de Apuestas against Monster & Murder Clown and Soul Rocker & Carta Brava Jr.

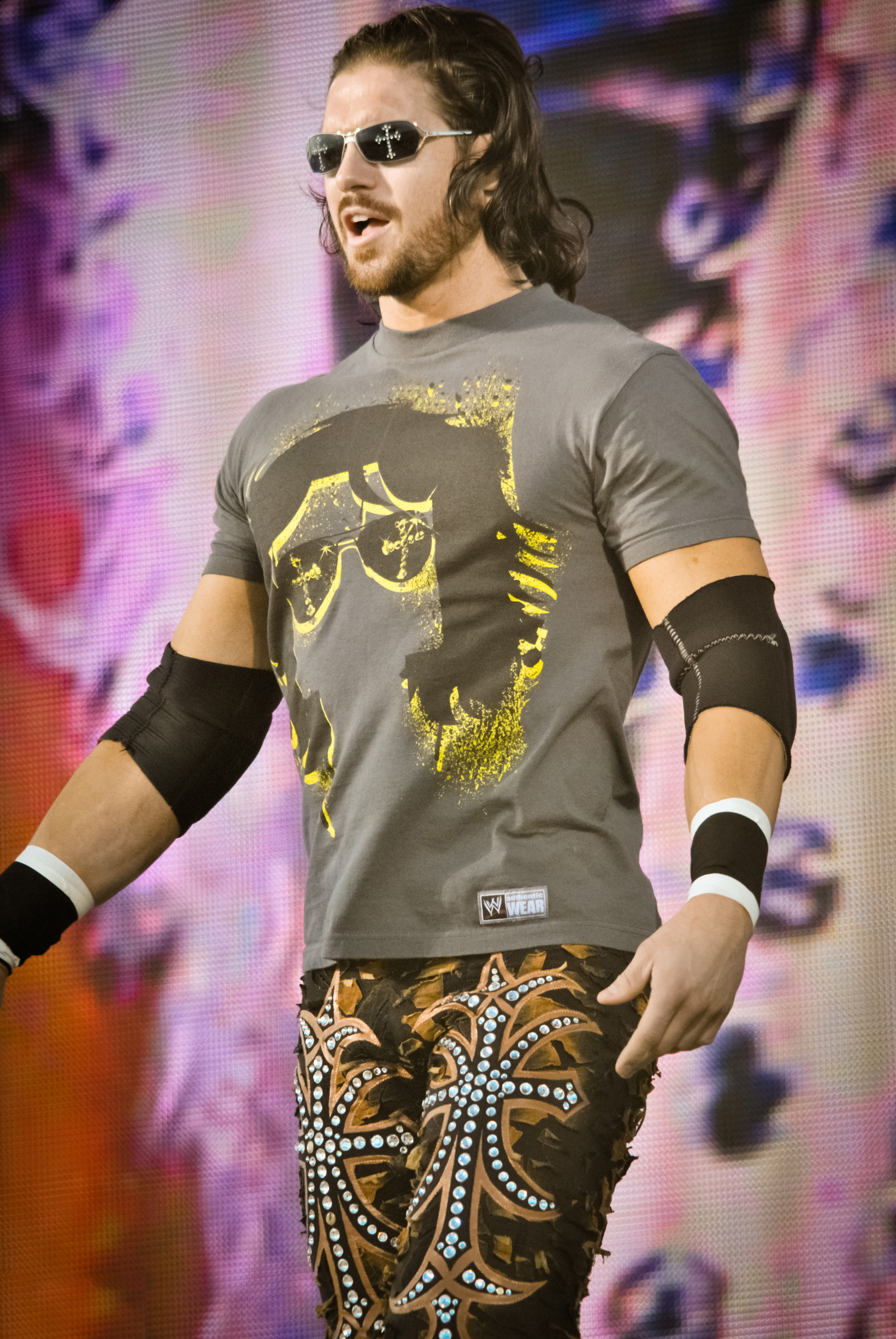
Johnny Mundo (pictured in 2011) defended his three championships, the AAA Mega Championship, AAA Latin American Championship and AAA World Cruiserweight Championship at Triplemanía XXV

At Rey de Reyes, AAA Latin American Champion Johnny Mundo defeated AAA Cruiserweight Champion Hijo del Fantasma and AAA Mega Champion Texano Jr. in a three-way match to win all three titles following interference from Kevin Kross, also during the match Texano was taken out of action with an injured neck after Fantasma hit him with a Thrill of the Kill onto a steel chair. At Verano de Escándalo a three-way steel cage match between Texano, Fantasma, and Kross ended without a winner when Fantasma and Texano escaped and touched the floor at the same time. After the match, Vampiro declared that both Texano and Fantasma would receive a shot at the titles at Triplemanía XXV. It was announced at a press conference that the match would be a three-way Tables, Ladders, and Chairs match.

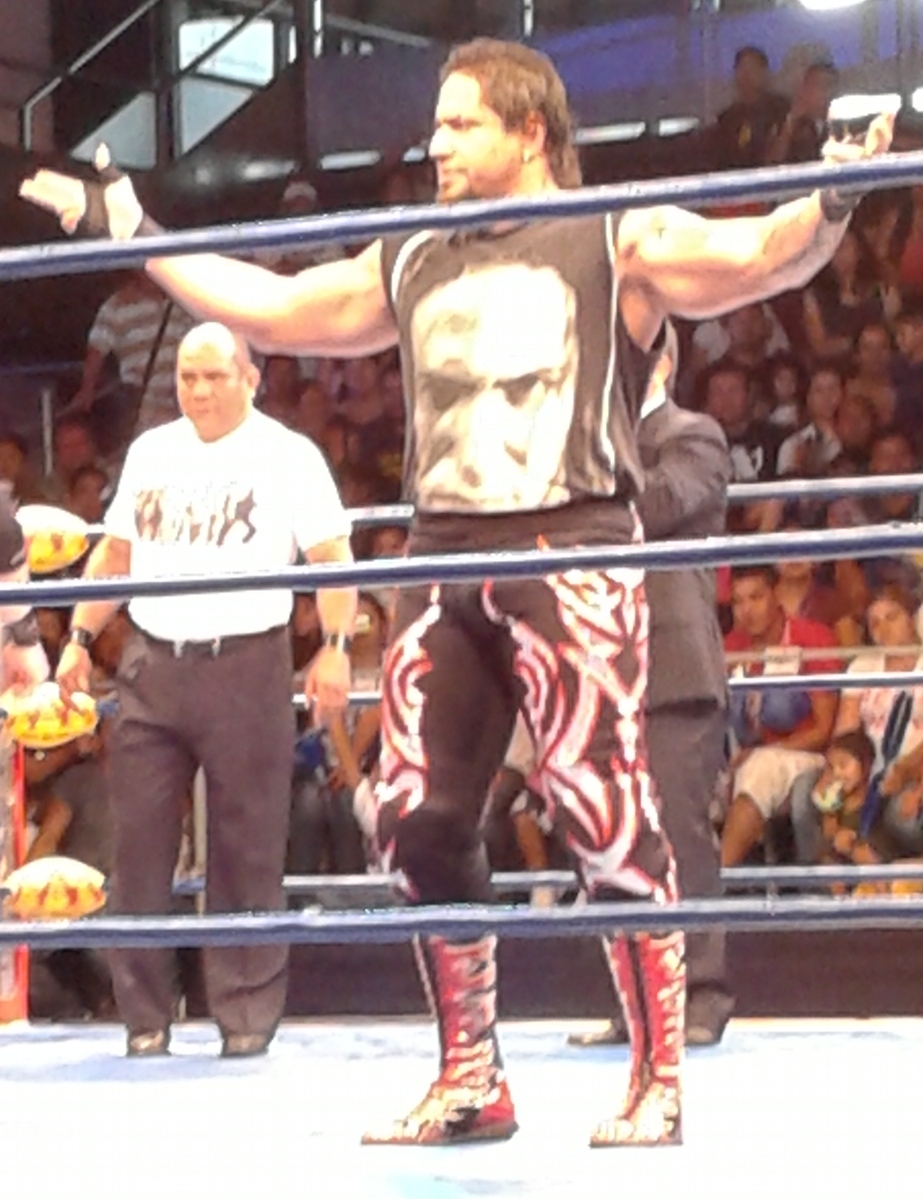
El Mesías started a feud with Pagano that lead them to a match in Triplemanía XXV

Another big feud heading into the event was between Pagano and El Mesías. At Guerra de Titanes, Pagano and Mesías teamed with Dr. Wagner Jr. to face the team of Psycho Clown, Texano Jr., and La Parka when tensions began to boil between them after Pagano had accidentally hit Mesías several times throughout the match. Despite the tension, the two continued to team with one another and even won the AAA World Tag Team Championships from Dark Cuervo and Dark Scoria on the June 17th episode of AAA Worldwide. After losing the titles at Verano de Escándalo due to another accidental hit from Pagano, Mesías finally snapped and brutally attacked Pagano including multiple shots with a steel chair and a stretcher board. At a press conference for Triplemanía XXV it was announced that Pagano and Mesías would face each other in a Street Fight. Shortly after the announcement, a heated argument at the press conference between the two led to Mesías pushing Pagano and caused staff members to separate them.

On July 1, AAA released a statement announcing that the AAA Reina de Reinas Championship was vacant, per decision of Director of Talent Vampiro. On July 16, Vampiro explained that this is because previous champion Taya did not appear to defend her championship, although they had never announced it. That same night, Sexy Star made her surprise return to professional wrestling, where she defeated Faby Apache, La Hiedra, Lady Shani, Big Mami and Goya Kong to win the AAA Reina de Reinas Championship for the third time. On July 25 at a press conference, she confirmed that she would defend her title at a future date. Her challenger would be decided in a qualifying tournament to be held on July 27 in Aguascalientes. Two days later, Lady Shani defeated La Hiedra, Kong and Mami to become the number one contender and face Star for the title in Triplemanía XXV. On August 18 at a second press conference, it was announced that the match would be a fatal four-way match by adding Ayako Hamada and GFW wrestler Rosemary.

== Results ==
No.	Results	Stipulations	Times
1^{P}	Dragon Solar, Pardux, Solaris and Ashley defeated Bronco Gonzalez, Chicano, Fetiche and Hashtary	Llave a la Gloria finals	6:41
2^{P}	Angelikal, El Hijo del Vikingo and The Tigger defeated Ángel Mortal Jr., Tiger Boy and Villano III Jr.	Llave a la Gloria finals	7:28
3	Hernandez, La Hiedra, Mamba and Mini Psycho Clown defeated Big Mami, Dinastía, Estrella Divina and Máscara de Bronce	Relevos Atómicos de Locura match	6:42
4	Sexy Star (c) was disqualified AND lost her title in a four-way match versus Ayako Hamada, Lady Shani, and Rosemary. Originally a win for Sexy Star, AAA officials overturned the result after it was determined that she caused a legitimate injury to Rosemary via an armbar, resulting in a disqualification and vacating of the title.)	Four-way match for the AAA Reina de Reinas Championship	9:55
5	Monster Clown and Murder Clown defeated Dark Cuervo and Dark Scoria (c), Aero Star and Drago, and GFW Team (DJZ & Andrew Everett)	Four-way match for the AAA World Tag Team Championship	13:23
6	Team Parka (Argenis, Bengala and La Parka) defeated Team Relevos Increibles (Australian Suicide, Faby Apache and Pimpinela Escarlata), Ex-AAA (Heavy Metal, Pirata Morgan and Villano IV), Los OGT's (Averno, Chessman and Super Fly), Los Guapos (Decnnis, Scorpio Jr. and Zumbido), Team GFW (Jeff Jarrett, Lashley and Moose), Los Vipers (Histeria, Maniaco and Psicosis), Mexican Powers (Crazy Boy, Lanzelot and Ñino Hamburguesa), Los Perros del Mal (Halloween, Joe Líder and Mr. Águila) and Leyendas (Blue Demon Jr., El Cobarde and El Intocable)	Torneo Triplemanía 25 with Los Vatos Locos and Los Payasos as Lumberjacks	26:14
7	Pagano vs. El Mesías ended in a no contest	Street Fight	16:41
8	Johnny Mundo (c) defeated Hijo del Fantasma and Texano Jr.	Three-way Tables, Ladders, and Chairs match for the AAA Mega Championship, AAA Latin American Championship and AAA World Cruiserweight Championship	22:04
9	Psycho Clown defeated Dr. Wagner Jr.	Lucha de Apuestas, mask vs. mask match	28:42
(c) / – the champion(s) heading into the match; P / – the match was broadcast on the pre-show

== Aftermath ==
After the event, it was reported that during the ending of the Reina de Reinas Championship match, Sexy Star had legitimately injured Rosemary with an armbar, popping Rosemary's arm out of its place. The incident gained some attention among other wrestlers, who voiced their opinions on social media including Road Dogg & Cody Rhodes on the apparent shoot. AAA subsequently stripped Sexy Star of her championship.

Jeff Jarrett's condition and behavior during the Torneo Triplemanía 25 match also raised many eyebrows. According to wrestling journalist Dave Meltzer, "Jarrett was said to be not in shape for wrestling and stumbled down the ring steps (although, he wasn't the only person on the show who had trouble with the steps), doing little wrestling in his match." On September 5, GFW announced that Jarrett was taking an indefinite leave of absence from the company; according to Meltzer, the decision to shelve Jarrett was made by a vice president of GFW owner Anthem Sports & Entertainment who was at the show. This took place against the backdrop of reports that Anthem was preparing to sell GFW.

== See also ==
- 2017 in professional wrestling
