= Guerra de Titanes (2017) =

2017 Lucha Libre AAA World Wide event

- Official poster for the show
- Promotion: Lucha Libre AAA World Wide
- Date: January 20, 2017
- City: Mexico City, Mexico
- Venue: Gimnasio Juan de la Barrera
- Attendance: 5000 (sold out)

Pay-per-view chronology
| ← Previous; Héroes Inmortales X | Next → Rey de Reyes |

Guerra de Titanes chronology
| ← Previous; 2016 | Next → January 2018 |

Guerra de Titanes (Spanish for "War of the Titans") was a major professional wrestling event scripted and produced by Lucha Libre AAA World Wide (AAA), a Mexican promotion. The event was the twentieth annual Guerra de Titanes show which, until 2015, has traditionally been AAA's "end of the year" show. In 2016 the show was shifted from December to January instead. The show was held in Gimnasio Juan de la Barrera in Mexico City, Mexico which also hosted the 2016 Guerra de Titanes show.

In the main event Johnny Mundo successfully defended the AAA Latin American Championship against former champion Pentagón Jr. The original main event match was moved down one stop for unexplained reasons and saw the team of Dr. Wagner Jr., El Mesías and Pagano defeat La Parka, Psycho Clown and El Texano Jr. El Hijo del Fantasma successfully defended the AAA World Cruiserweight Championship while Aero Star and Super Fly lost a steel cage match forcing them to fight in Lucha de Apuestas. The show included two additional matches.

The day after Guerra de Titanes three AAA wrestlers, Pentagón Jr., Daga and Garza Jr. left AAA, making a surprise appearance at a "The Crash" event in Tijuana, announcing that they were no longer working for AAA.

== Production ==
=== Background ===
Starting in 1997 the Mexican professional wrestling, company AAA held a major wrestling show late in the year, either November or December, called Guerra de Titanes ("War of the Titans"). The show often features championship matches or Lucha de Apuestas or bet matches where the competitors risked their wrestling mask or hair on the outcome of the match. In Lucha Libre the Lucha de Apuetas match is considered more prestigious than a championship match and a lot of the major shows feature one or more Apuesta matches. The Guerra de Titanes show is hosted by a new location each year, emanating from cities such as Madero, Chihuahua, Chihuahua, Mexico City, Guadalajara, Jalisco and more. In 2016 AAA moved the Guerra de Titanes show to January, with the 2017 version continuing that trend.

=== Storylines ===
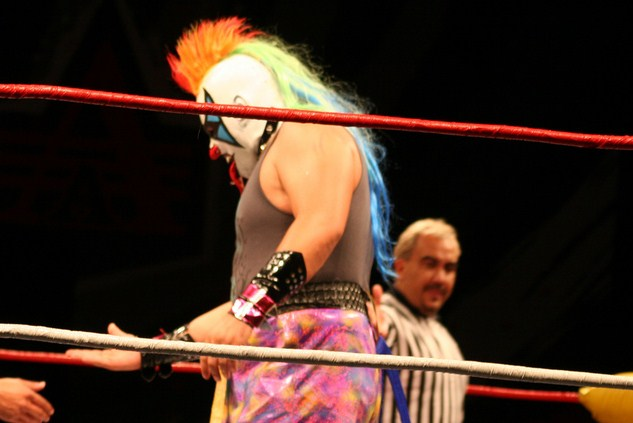
Psycho Clown, part of the main storyline in AAA along with Dr. Wagner Jr.

The Guerra de Titanes show featured six professional wrestling matches with different wrestlers involved in pre-existing, scripted feuds, plots, and storylines. Wrestlers were viewed as either heels (referred to as rudos in Mexico, those that portray the "bad guys") or faces (técnicos in Mexico, the "good guy" characters) as they followed a series of tension-building events, which culminated in a wrestling match or series of matches.

At Triplemanía XXIV, AAA's biggest show of the year, Psycho Clown defeated Pagano in the main event Lucha de Apuestas, or "bet match". During the closing moments of the match Dr. Wagner Jr. came to the ring, initially looking like he was trying to help Psycho Clown, but turned on him instead. After the match was over Dr. Wagner Jr. challenged Psycho Clown to put his mask on the line at Triplemanía XXV the following year. At AAA's next major show, Héroes Inmortales X, Dr. Wagner Jr, Psycho Clown and Pagan faced off in a triple threat match. During the match Psycho Clown's long time tag team partners Murder Clown and Monster Clown joined sides with Dr. Wagner Jr., attacking Psycho Clown so Dr. Wagner Jr. could win the match. For Guerra de Titanes AAA originally announced that Dr. Wagner Jr., Pagano and El Mesías would wrestle the trio of Psycho Clown, La Parka, and El Texano Jr. in the main event.

On July 3, 2016 Pentagón Jr. defeated Psycho Clown to win the AAA Latin American Championship. The following week the team of Johnny Mundo, El Mesias and Hernandez, collectively referred to as "Team Trump", defeated the trio of Pentagón Jr., El Texano Jr. and El Hijo del Fantasma when Mundo pinned Pentagón Jr. Following the match Mundo challenged Pentagón Jr. to defend the Latin American championship against Mundo since he just pinned the champion. At Triplemanía XXIV Mundo won the AAA Latin American Championship from Pentagón Jr., furthering the storyline of Mundo, along with the rest of "Team Trump", claiming that the United States was much better than Mexico. At Héroes Inmortales X Mundo defeated Garza Jr., following a challenge by Pentagón Jr. for a rematch at the 2017 Guerrera de Titanes, a challenge that was later accepted.

== Aftermath ==
The night after the show at a show promoted by The Crash in Tijuana, Baja California, Pentagón Jr., Daga and Garza Jr. made a surprise appearance during the show, alongside Pentagón Jr.'s brother Fénix el Rey. The trio announced that they had left AAA effective immediately. At the same time Pentagón Jr. announced that he would be known as "Penta El 0M" ("Cero Miedo") since AAA owned the rights to the name Pentagón Jr. All three wrestlers cited their unhappiness with AAA and the lack of opportunities they were given. It was later revealed that none of the wrestlers had told AAA they were leaving, which meant that both Pentagón Jr. and Garza Jr.'s championship losses were the planned finishes. When asked for a reaction to the three wrestlers leaving AAA officials simply stated that those that remained with AAA were happy to be there, not commenting further on the situation.

== Results ==
| No. | Results | Stipulations |
|---|---|---|
| 1 | Dave The Clown, Lady Shani, Mamba, Mini Psycho Clown defeated Bengala, Big Mami, Dinastía and Pimpinela Escarlata | Relevos Tríos de Locura match |
| 2 | Los OGTs (Averno and Chessman) defeated Faby Apache and Mary Apache | Intergender tag team match |
| 3 | Aero Star and Súper Fly lost after Argenis, Australian Suicide, Angélico, Carta Brava Jr. and Daga left the cage | Steel cage match |
| 4 | El Hijo del Fantasma (c) defeated Garza Jr. | Singles match for the AAA World Cruiserweight Championship |
| 5 | Dr. Wagner Jr., El Mesías and Pagano defeated La Parka, Psycho Clown and El Texano Jr. | Six-man "Lucha Libre rules" tag team match |
| 6 | Johnny Mundo (c) defeated Pentagón Jr. | Singles match for the AAA Latin American Championship |
(c) / – the champion(s) heading into the match

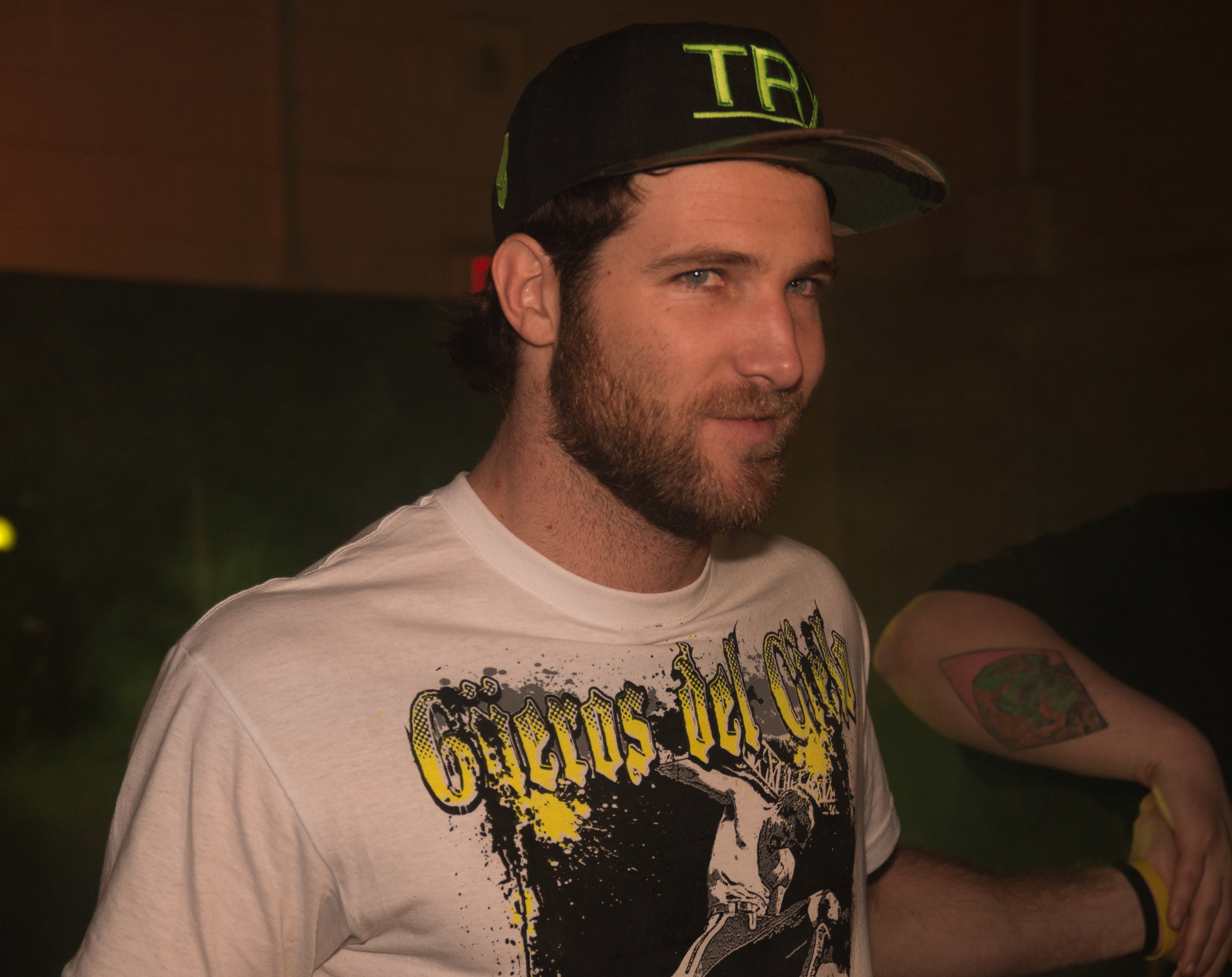
South African wrestler Angélico, the third man to escape the cage.

Cage match order of escape

1. Carta Brava Jr.
2. Argenis
3. Angélico
4. Daga
5. Australian Suicide

== See also ==
- 2017 in professional wrestling
