= Rey de Reyes (2017) =

2017 Lucha Libre AAA World Wide event

- Official poster for the 2017 Rey de Reyes show
- Promotion: Lucha Libre AAA World Wide
- Date: March 19, 2017
- City: Monterrey, Nuevo León, Mexico
- Venue: Arena Jose Sulaiman

Event chronology
← Previous; Guerra de Titanes	Next → Verano de Escándalo

Rey de Reyes chronology
← Previous; 2016	Next → 2018

The 2017 Rey de Reyes (Spanish for "King of Kings") was a professional wrestling event produced by the Lucha Libre AAA World Wide, or simply AAA, promotion. The 2017 version was the 21st year in a row that AAA has held a Rey de Reyes show and tournament. Previous Rey de Reyes tournaments consisted of several rounds, but for 2017 AAA held a nine-man Royal Rumble-style elimination match, which was won by Argenis.

The show saw several changes compared to the originally announced matches, including Johnny Mundo, the AAA Latin American Champion defeating AAA Mega Champion El Texano Jr. and AAA World Cruiserweight Champion El Hijo del Fantasma to win both championships, making him the first man to hold all three championships. In the main event of the reshuffled card Aero Star defeated Súper Fly in a Lucha de Apuestas, or bet match, forcing Súper Fly to have all his hair shaved off after the match.

== Production ==
=== Background ===
Starting in 1997 and every year since then the Mexican Lucha Libre, or professional wrestling, company AAA has held a Rey de Reyes (Spanish for "King of Kings') show in the spring. The 1997 version was held in February, while all subsequent Rey de Reyes shows were held in March. As part of their annual Rey de Reyes event AAA holds the eponymious Rey de Reyes tournament to determine that specific year's Rey. Most years the show hosts both the qualifying round and the final match, but on occasion the qualifying matches have been held prior to the event as part of AAA's weekly television shows. The traditional format consists of four preliminary rounds, each a Four-man elimination match with each of the four winners face off in the tournament finals, again under elimination rules. There have been years where AAA has employed a different format to determine a winner. The winner of the Rey de Reyes tournament is given a large ornamental sword to symbolize their victory, but is normally not guaranteed any other rewards for winning the tournament, although some years becoming the Rey de Reyes has earned the winner a match for the AAA Mega Championship. From 1999 through 2009 AAA also held an annual Reina de Reinas ("Queen of Queens") tournament, but later turned that into an actual championship that could be defended at any point during the year, abandoning the annual tournament concept.

The 2017 Rey de Reyes took place at Arena José Sulaimán in Monterrey, Nuevo León, the fourth time Rey de Reyes was held in Monterrey and the first time it was held at Arena José Sulaimán. The show was the 19th Rey de Reyes show in the series. AAA had originally announced that the 2017 Rey de Reyes tournament would consist of one match, a three-way match between the three reigning AAA singles champions as El Texano Jr. (AAA Mega Championship) would face El Hijo del Fantasma (AAA World Cruiserweight Championship) and Johnny Mundo (AAA Latin American Championship).

=== Event ===
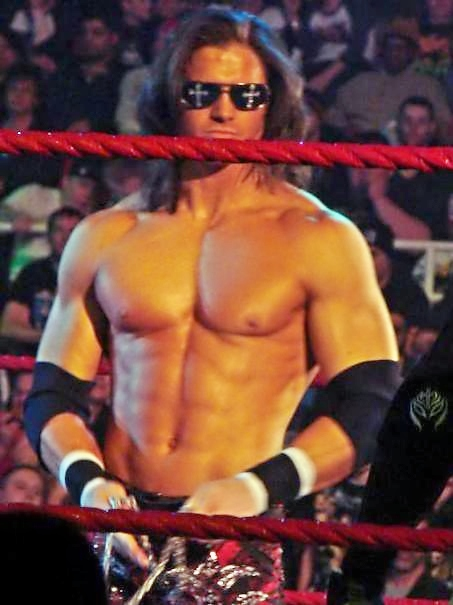
Johnny Mundo, who became a triple champion at the Rey de Reyes show.

The Rey de Reyes show featured seven professional wrestling matches with different wrestlers involved in pre-existing, scripted feuds, plots, and storylines. Wrestlers were portrayed as either heels (referred to as rudos in Mexico, those that portray the "bad guys") or faces (técnicos in Mexico, the "good guy" characters) as they followed a series of tension-building events, which culminated in a wrestling match or series of matches.

The opening match, a steel cage match between the team of Pagano / El Mesias and Dark Cuervo / Dark Scoria was originally announced as the fourth match of the night, but was moved to the first instead. Under AAA rules the match could be won by escaping the cage to the floor, usually by climbing over to side to the floor. During the match Curvo climbed over the top to the floor, waiting for his partner to also exit. In the closing moments of the match El Mesias tackled Dark Scoria through the cage, driving both of them to the ground outside the ring, which was ruled as an escape for Dark Scoria. As a result of their victory Dark Cuervo and Dark Scoria earned a match for the AAA World Tag Team Championship at a future date.

Mari Apache was originally scheduled to be part of the #1 contender for the AAA Reina de Reinas Championship but was unable to compete due to a skull injury. AAA had announced a luchadora sorpresa (a "surprise wrestler") that turned out to be Mexican-Japanese Ayako Hamada who had last worked for AAA in 2008. Faby Apache was the first wrestler eliminated, followed by Goya Kong, La Hiedra and Big Mami. The match came down to Ayako and Lady Shani, with Hamada gaining the final pinfall and thus the right to challenge for the AAA Reina de Reinas Championship later on in the show.

Prior to the third match of the show, Impact Wrestling representative Jeff Jarrett came to ringside with AAA official Dorian Roldan to announce that the two promotions had reached a working agreement. The next match, originally scheduled to be the main event of the show, was not only moved down the card, but was no longer for the 2017 Rey de Reyes title. Instead AAA official Vampiro announced that all three championships would be on the line in the match as AAA Mega Champion El Texano Jr. faced off against AAA World Cruiserweight Champion El Hijo del Fantasma and AAA Latin American Champion Johnny Mundo. During the match El Hijo del Fantasma was able to perform "The Thrill of the Hunt" (one of his signature moves, a Samoan driver onto a steel chair) on Texano Jr. After taking the move El Texano Jr. was attended to by paramedics, to give the impression that the move hurt Texano Jr. so badly that he had to be taken from the ring on a stretcher. Moments later Johnny Mundo was aided by an unidentified man who attacked El Hijo del Fantasma. The attack led to Mundo pinning El Hijo del Fantasma to win the match and become a triple champion.

The next match originally announced as a Falls count anywhere match, but was instead contested under normal tag team rules. For the match long-time rivals Psycho Clown and Dr. Wagner Jr. fought Murder Clown and Monster Clown, who had turned on both Psycho Clown and Wagner in the months leading up to the match. Psycho Clown and Dr. Wagner Jr. managed to get along well enough to defeat the two traitorous clowns. Moments after the match was over all four wrestlers were attacked by a group consisting of Carta Brava Jr., Mocho Cota Jr. and Soul Rocker who beat up all four competitors and then stole Dr. Wagner Jr.'s mask. The semi-main even match was Taya's third Reina de Reinas championship defense since winning the title in 2014 as she fought Ayako Hamada. Hamada pinned Taya cleaning, becoming the 20th Reina de Reinas in AAA history.

The semi-final match was the previously unannounced Rey de Reyes tournament, a nine-man elimination match, fought under delayed entry battle royal rules where a new competitor joined the match at a timed interval and wrestlers were eliminated by being thrown out of the ring. The order of elimination was Pimpinela Escarlata, Niño Hamburguesa, El Elegido, Joe Líder, La Parka, Chessman and Bengala leaving Argenis and Averno as the last two men. The final elimination happened by pinfall as Argenis pinned Averno to win the Rey de Reyes tournament and the Rey de Reyes sword that symbolizes the victory.

In the last match of the night Aero Star put his mask on the line against long time rival Súper Fly who would risk his hair in a Lucha de Apuestas, or "bet match". During the match both wrestlers bled profusely and Aero Star's mask was torn up by Súper Fly. At one point the two wrestlers fought outside the ring, with Aero Star climbing to the second level of the arena, only to leap off the edge onto Súper Fly who was positioned below. At one point Súper Fly used a pair of brass knuckles to hit Aero Star to get the pinfall and looked like he had won the match. Vampiro made his way to ringside and informed the referee of what had happened and restarted the match. The restart allowed Aero Star to pin his opponent, forcing Súper Fly to kneel in the middle of the ring and have all his hair shaved off as per the Lucha de Apuestas stipulation.

== Results ==
No.	Results	Stipulations
1	Dark Cuervo and Dark Scoria defeated El Mesías and Pagano	#1 Contenders for the AAA World Tag Team Championship, Steel cage match
2	Ayako Hamada defeated Faby Apache, La Hiedra, Lady Shani, Goya Kong and Big Mami	#1 Contender for the AAA Reina de Reinas Championship
3	Johnny Mundo (Latin American) defeated El Hijo del Fantasma (Cruiserweight) and El Texano Jr. (Mega)	Winner Takes All triple threat match for the AAA Mega Championship, AAA World Cruiserweight Championship and AAA Latin American Championship
4	Dr. Wagner Jr. and Psycho Clown defeated Monster Clown and Murder Clown	tag team match
5	Ayako Hamada defeated Taya (c)	Singles match for the AAA Reina de Reinas Championship
6	Argenis defeated Averno, Bengala, Chessman, El Elegido, Joe Líder, Niño Hamburguesa, La Parka and Pimpinela Escarlata	2017 Rey de Reyes tournament
7	Aero Star defeated Súper Fly	Best two-out-of-three falls Lucha de Apuestas, mask vs. hair match
(c) / – the champion(s) heading into the match

== See also ==
- 2017 in professional wrestling
