= Verano de Escándalo (2017) =

2017 Lucha Libre AAA World Wide event

- Official poster
- Promotion: Lucha Libre AAA Worldwide
- Date: June 4, 2017
- City: Ciudad Juárez, Chihuahua, Mexico
- Venue: Gimnasio Josué Neri Santos
- Attendance: 23,345

Event chronology
← Previous; Rey de Reyes	Next → Triplemanía XXV

Verano de Escándalo chronology
← Previous; 2015	Next → 2018

Verano de Escándalo (2017) (Spanish for "Summer of Scandal") is major professional wrestling event produced by the Mexican Lucha Libre AAA Worldwide (AAA) promotion, which took place on June 4, 2017 in "Gimnasio Josué Neri Santos " in Ciudad Juárez, Chihuahua, Mexico. The Verano de Escándalo event has been a regular summer event for AAA since 1997, only skipping the event in 2012, 2013 and 2016. 2017 marked the 18th time AAA has used that name for an event.

In the main event of the show three teams, Psycho Clown and Dr. Wagner Jr., El Nuevo Poder del Norte (Carta Brava Jr. and Soul Rocker) and Monster Clown and Murder Clown, put their mask on the line in a Lucha de Apuestas, or bet match where the losing team was forced to unmask after the match. In the end Psycho Clown and Dr. Wagner Jr. defeated Carta Brava Jr. and Soul Rocker, while Monster Clown and Murder Clown survived the match without having to unmask. The show also featured an additional Lucha de Apuestas as Pimpinela Escarlata defeated Mamba, forcing Mamba to have all his hair shaved off after the loss. Dark Cuervo and Dark Escoria regained the AAA World Tag Team Championship from El Mesías and Pagano in a match that also included the teams of Aero Star/Drago and Australian Suicide/Bengala.

== Production ==
=== Background ===
In September 1997 Mexican professional wrestling, company Asistencia Asesoría y Administración, later known as "AAA", or Triple A and then Lucha Libre AAA Worldwide added a new major event to their schedule as they held the first ever Verano de Escándalo ("Summer of Scandal") show on September 14, 1997. The Verano de Escándalo show became an annual event from 1997 until 2011, usually held in September, with few exceptions. In 2012 AAA changed their major event schedule as they pushed Triplemanía XX to August instead of holding the show in June or July as had been the case up until 2012. With the change to the schedule AAA did not hold a Verano de Escándalo show in 2012 and 2013. In 2014 the show was put back on the schedule, but held in June instead, filling the void left when Triplemanía was moved. AAA did not hold a Verano de Escándalo in 2016, instead holding the Lucha Libre World Cup in June. The 2017 Verano de Escándalo show will be the 18th show in the series.

=== Storylines ===
The Verano de Escándalo show featured a number of professional wrestling matches with different wrestlers involved in pre-existing, scripted feuds, plots, and storylines. Wrestlers were portrayed as either heels (referred to as rudos in Mexico, those that portray the "bad guys") or faces (técnicos in Mexico, the "good guy" characters) as they followed a series of tension-building events, which culminated in a wrestling match or series of matches.

The top storyline in AAA leading up to Verano de Escándalo began in August 2016 at Triplemanía XXIV, during the main event match between the tecnico Psycho Clown and rudo Pagano, Dr. Wagner Jr. came to the ring, looking like he was going to save Psycho Clown from outside interference. Moments later he hit Psycho Clown below the belt to help Pagano out. In the end Psycho Clown overcame the odds and pinned Pagano to win the match. Afterwards Dr. Wagner Jr. challenged Psycho Clown to put his mask on the line at the following year's Triplemanía XXV show, a challenge that was immediately accepted. At the next AAA super show, Héroes Inmortales X, Dr. Wagner Jr. defeated Psycho Clown and Pagano in a three-way match when Psycho Clown's partners in Los Psycho Circus (Monster Clown and Murder Clown) turned on him and sided with Dr. Wagner Jr. instead. The two rivals would later officially sign the contract for the Lucha de Apuestas, or "bet match". During an AAA show in mid December Psycho Clown's sister Goya Kong, would also turn on her brother, as she hit him with a steel chair as AAA continued to stack to the odds against Psycho Clown towards the Triplemanía XXV.

In early 2017 Monster Clown and Murder Clown turned on Dr. Wagner Jr. as well, leading to a match at the 2017 Rey de Reyes show where rivals Dr. Wagner Jr. and Psycho Clown reluctantly teamed up to face Monster Clown and Murder Clown. After the odd pairing won the match, Soul Rocker, Carta Brava Jr. and Mocho Cota Jr. attacked both Dr. Wagner Jr. and Psycho Clown only moments after the team had won their match. After the attack the trio stole the mask of Dr. Wagner Jr. At a subsequent AAA show the trio, now dubbed El Nuevo Poder del Norte were wrestling against the trio of Australian Suicide, Lanzeloth and Máscara de Bronce when Dr. Wagner Jr and Psycho Clown entered the ring to attack them. Moments later Murder Clown and Monster Clown came to the ring to even the sides, leading to the match becoming a 5-on-5 tag team match instead. Dr. Wagner Jr. pinned Mocho Cota Jr. but was left without his mask once more after the match was over. During the AAA show on April 14 Dr. Wagner Jr. was slated to face Psycho Clown in the main event, but the two were attacked by El Nuevo Poder del Norte, leading to a tag team match where Soul Rocker and Carta Brava Jr. defeated Dr. Wagner Jr. and Psycho Clown. Following their victory Soul Rocker and Carta Brava Jr. challenged their opponents to put their masks on the line in a Lucha de Apuestas. Both Dr. Wagner Jr. and Psycho Clown verbally accepted the match but no official date for the match was announced. A week later El Nuevo Poder del Norte demanded a match for the AAA World Trios Championship as part of the show. Faby Apache came out, but without her championship partners Mari Apache and El Apache. Moments later Faby Apache brought out Dr. Wagner Jr. and Psycho Clown as her replacement partners for a match against El Nuevo Poder del Norte. El Nuevo Poder del Norte won the match by pinning Faby Apache, making them the new champions.

== Results ==
No.	Results	Stipulations
1^{D}	VIP defeated Magnifico	Singles match
2	Máscara de Bronce defeated Hernandez	Singles match
3	Los OGTs (Averno, Chessman and Super Fly) defeated La Parka, Argenis and Lanceloth	Six-man "Lucha Libre rules" tag team match
4	Dark Cuervo and Dark Escoria defeated El Mesías and Pagano (c), Aero Star and Drago, and Bengala and Australian Suicide	Four-way match for the AAA World Tag Team Championship
5	Pimpinela Escarlata defeated Mamba	Lucha de Apuestas, hair vs. hair match
6	El Hijo del Fantasma vs. Kevin Kross vs. El Texano Jr. ended in a no contest	Steel Cage Triple threat match
7	Psycho Clown and Dr. Wagner Jr. defeated Nuevo Poder del Norte (Carta Brava Jr. and Soul Rocker) and Los Totalmente Traidores (Monster Clown and Murder Clown)	six-way Lucha de Apuestas, masks vs. masks, match
(c) / – the champion(s) heading into the match; D / – this was a dark match
