= Baloke =

- Village
- Location in Punjab, India Baloke (India)
- Coordinates: 30.386009°N 75.3079641°E
- Country: India
- State: Punjab
- District: Barnala
- Tehsil: Tapa

Languages
  - Official: Punjabi
  - Other spoken: Hindi
- Time zone: UTC+5:30 (IST)
- Pin code: 148108
- Telephone code: 01679
- ISO 3166 code: IN-PB
- Vehicle registration: PB-19

Baloke is a village situated in the Barnala district, Punjab, India. As of the 2011 census, it had a population of 1,303 persons.

== Administration and literacy ==
The village is administrated by a sarpanch who is an elected representative of the village as per the constitution of India and the Panchayati raj. The village falls under the Tapa Tehsil and is governed by a tahsildar. The village is about 14 kilometres (8.7 mi) distance from the sub-district headquarters of Tapa Tehsil and about 22 kilometres (14 mi) distance from the district headquarters of Barnala. As per the 2011 census, out of a population of 1,303 people, 693 are literate and 610 are illiterate; Baloke's literacy rate is 59.64%, which is lower than the average of 75.84% in the state of Punjab. The male literacy rate stands at 60.48% and the female literacy rate at 58.67%.

== Demography ==
Per the 2011 census, Baloke had 254 houses with a population of 1,303, consisting of 694 males and 609 females. The population of children aged 0–6 was 141, making up 10.82% of the total population of the village. The average sex ratio was 878 out of 1000, which is lower than the state average of 895 out of 1000. The child sex ratio in the village was 905 out of 1000, which is higher than the average of 846 out of 1000 in the state of Punjab. The total Scheduled Castes and Scheduled Tribes population in the village was 414 people and all were Scheduled Castes. There are no people of the Scheduled Tribe in the village. The village's total geographical area is about 679.08 hectares.

== Notable people ==
Baloke village is the birthplace of Satnam Singh Bhamara, the first Indian to be drafted into the National Basketball Association in North America.
