= Satnam Singh =

Indian basketball player and wrestler (born 1995)

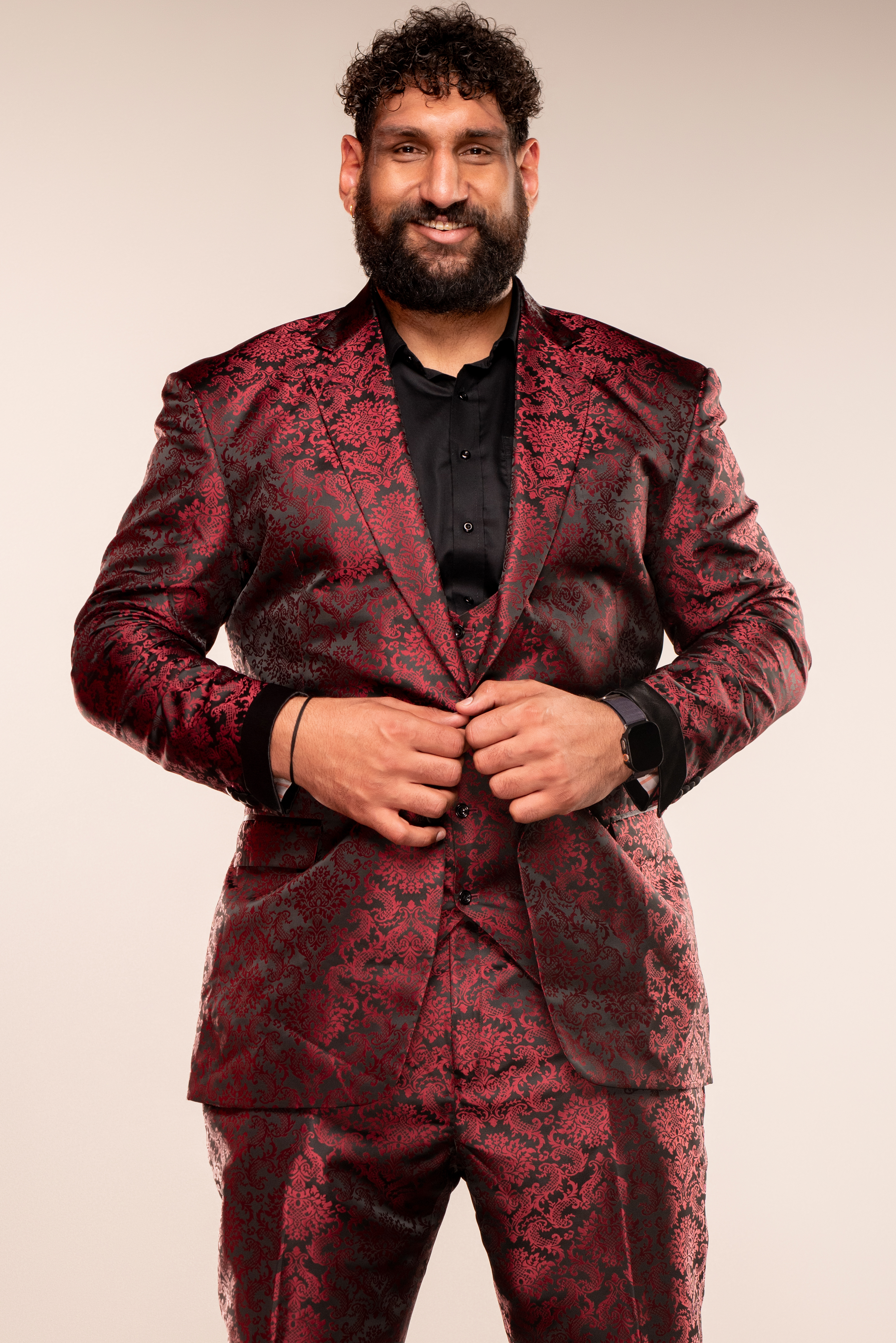
- Singh in 2023

Personal information
- Born: 10 December 1995 (age 30) Baloke, Punjab, India
- Listed height: 7 ft 2 in (2.18 m)
- Listed weight: 400 lb (181 kg)

Career information
- High school: IMG Academy (Bradenton, Florida)
- NBA draft: 2015: 2nd round, 52nd overall pick
- Drafted by: Dallas Mavericks
- Playing career: 2015–2019
- Position: Center

Career history
- 2015–2017: Texas Legends
- 2018–2019: St. John's Edge
- Stats at Basketball Reference

Satnam Singh Loyal Bhamara (born 10 December 1995) is an Indian professional wrestler and former professional basketball player. As a wrestler, he is signed to the American professional wrestling promotion All Elite Wrestling (AEW). He also makes appearances for its sister promotion Ring of Honor (ROH) and independent circuit. He became the first Indian player to be drafted into the National Basketball Association (NBA) when the Dallas Mavericks selected him with the 52nd overall pick of the 2015 NBA draft. At 7 ft 2 in (2.18 m) and 400 pounds (180 kg), Singh played the center position. He played high school basketball at IMG Academy in Bradenton, Florida.

== Early life ==
Singh was born on 11 December 1995, to Balbir Singh and Sukhwinder Kaur in Balloke, a small, remote village located in the state of Punjab. Both Singh's father, who played basketball due to his exceptional height, and his paternal grandfather were wheat farmers and millers. He grew up with two siblings, sister Sarabjot Kaur and brother Beant Singh Bhamara.

When he was nine years old, Singh stood 5 feet 9 inches (1.75 m), taller than most people in his village. His father helped introduce him to basketball and mounted a hoop in a dirt courtyard near his house. By local spectators, Singh was nicknamed "Chhotu," meaning "little one" in Punjabi, as his rapid physical growth made the basketball seem to shrink in his hands over time. Singh soon saw great success in youth leagues in his state.

At age 10, he enrolled at Ludhiana Basketball Academy in Ludhiana, Punjab, with the help of his father's friend Rajinder Singh. At the academy, Singh first learned many basketball skills and drills. At age 14, Singh stood 6 feet 6 inches (1.98 m), weighed 230 pounds (104 kg), and wore size-18 shoes. As he was further exposed to professional basketball, including the NBA, he began idolizing Kobe Bryant and modeling his game after Yao Ming and Dwight Howard.

== High school basketball career ==
In early 2010, it was announced that the global sports marketing business IMG was partnering with Reliance Industries, the largest corporation in India, to form a new company known as IMG Reliance (IMGR). They formed a new sports and entertainment marketing company and made their first move by signing a 30-year contract with the Basketball Federation of India (BFI). The decision was an attempt at improving the facilities and leagues in the country and they started allowing athletes to attend the Bradenton-based IMG Academy on a full scholarship.

Singh led the Punjab state youth team to a national championship in June 2010, leading the BFI to choose him to play at an NBA Basketball Without Borders camp in Singapore. The BFI's head coach, Harish Sharma, had him play against members of the Indian national team, and he managed to compete with them. Sharma recommended Singh for IMGR to consider him for a scholarship, but at 14 years of age, he was too old. Sharma said, "This boy, you will want to see. I've told people many times, he can become India's Yao Ming." Troy Justice, who directed basketball operations for the NBA in India, also visited Punjab and discovered Singh at the NBA Mahindra Challenge. He said, "First time I saw him play, he was wearing shoes that were falling apart. The seams had split, and he was coming right out of them. That's all he had. He was growing so fast. We helped him get shoes. I've heard people talk, but we're not sure they know how big he'll get." Justice had confidence in him, however, saying, "He can be the chosen one for basketball in India."

Nevertheless, Singh was later awarded a scholarship under the IMGR basketball training academy and moved to Bradenton, Florida in September 2010. Despite knowing no English at the time, he was one of 29 student-athletes—male and female combined—to be selected to train at IMG Academy. During the 2014–15 season, he averaged 9.2 points, 8.4 rebounds and 2.2 blocks in less than 20 minutes per game for IMG, the No. 2 ranked team in the country. However, Singh did not academically qualify to play college basketball in the National Collegiate Athletic Association (NCAA).

== Professional basketball career ==
In April 2015, Singh was announced as an early entrant for the 2015 NBA draft. At the draft on 25 June 2015, he was selected by the Dallas Mavericks with the 52nd overall pick, becoming the first Indian-born player to be drafted into the NBA. Earlier he was interviewed by the Houston Rockets. The story of his interview by Daryl Morey, GM of the Houston Rockets is recounted in detail by Michael Lewis in his book The Undoing Project. Singh also became the first player since the 2005 draft to enter without playing in college, overseas professionally, or in the NBA Development League. On 8 July 2019, his draft rights were traded alongside two second round picks to the Memphis Grizzlies in a sign and trade for Delon Wright.

=== Texas Legends (2015–2017) ===
In July 2015, Singh joined the Mavericks for the 2015 NBA Summer League. On 31 October 2015, he was acquired by the Texas Legends, the D-League affiliate of the Mavericks. On 13 November 2015, he made his professional debut in a 104–82 loss to the Austin Spurs, recording four points, three rebounds and one assist in nine minutes. On 5 February 2016, he had a season-best game with six points and six rebounds in 22 minutes of action as a starter in a 136–80 loss to Raptors 905. He appeared in 19 games (two starts) for the Legends during the 2015–16 season, averaging 1.5 points and 1.5 rebounds in 8 minutes per game.

On 30 October 2016, Singh was re-acquired by the Legends. After playing for the Legends during the 2016–17 season, he joined the Dallas Mavericks for the 2017 NBA Summer League. In January 2017, he featured in a one-hour documentary on Netflix, titled "One in a Billion," which covered his background and path to the NBA.

On 3 November 2017, Singh signed a contract with the UBA Pro Basketball League in India. In January 2018, he took part in the UBA US Pro Performance Camp in Phoenix, Arizona.

=== St. John's Edge (2018–2019) ===
On 6 September 2018, Singh signed with the St. John's Edge of the National Basketball League of Canada. His arrival to the team's training camp was delayed by visa issues, which were settled after he contacted Canadian and Indian government officials through Twitter.

== National team career ==
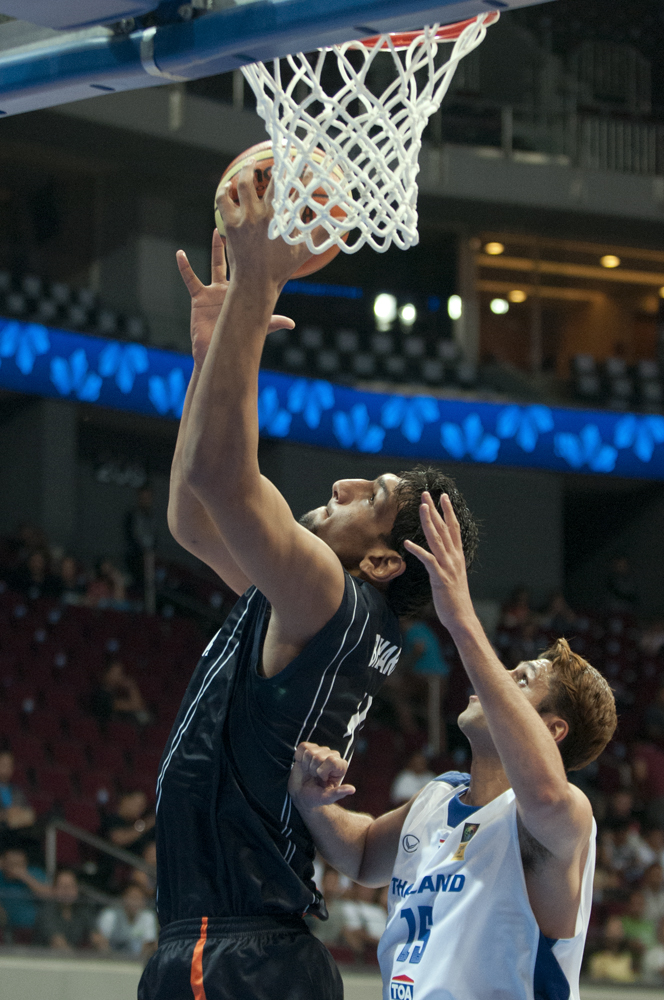
Singh (left side) with the Indian national team in 2013

In the summer of 2009, when he was 13 years old, Singh played for the Indian national under-16 basketball team at the 2009 FIBA Asia Under-16 Championship hosted by Johor Bahru, Malaysia. He averaged 1.5 points per game in limited minutes, as his team finished in 10th place. Singh debuted for the senior Indian national team at the 2011 FIBA Asia Championship in Wuhan, China, where he averaged 2.5 points and 2.8 rebounds per game. At the 2013 FIBA Asia Championship, he received more playing time, averaging 4.2 points and 2.7 rebounds for India. Singh returned to his national team for the 2017 FIBA Asia Cup in Beirut, Lebanon. However, he struggled to keep up with the pace and only played about eight minutes per game during the tournament. Singh averaged just one point and 0.7 rebounds through three games. In 2017 and 2018, he joined India at 2019 FIBA World Cup qualification, assuming a leading role due to the absences of multiple key players. In 2020, Singh was handed a two-year ban by the National Anti-Doping Agency's (NADA) disciplinary panel for failing a dope test.

== Professional wrestling career ==
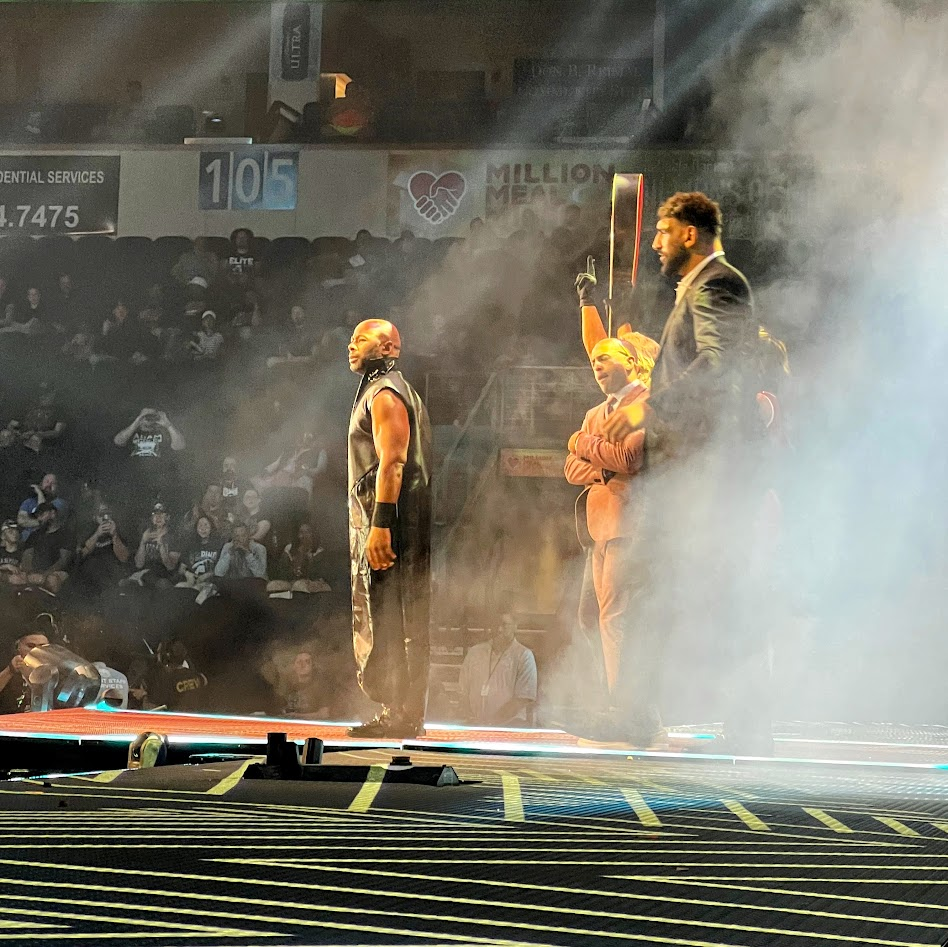
Singh [rear] alongside Sonjay Dutt and Jay Lethal in October 2023.

On 23 September 2021, he was signed by All Elite Wrestling. He made his televised debut on the 13 April 2022 episode of AEW Dynamite, where he attacked Samoa Joe and aligned himself with Jay Lethal and Sonjay Dutt. On 17 August 2024, Singh teamed with Raj Dhesi at the Lucha Libre AAA Worldwide event, Triplemanía XXXII: Mexico City, where they competed in a three-way tag team match for the AAA World Tag Team Championship, which they won, marking Singh's first title win in his career. The promotion vacated the titles on March 19, 2025.

== Personal life ==
=== Legal Issues ===
In 2020, Singh tested positive for Higenamine Beta-2-Agonist. This was added to the World Anti-Doping Agency (WADA) Prohibited List in 2017 and was classified as a beta-2 agonist, meaning it is prohibited at all times, both in and out of competition. Due to this issue, the National Anti-Doping Agency of India (NADA) placed a two-year professional suspension ban on Singh.

== Championships and accomplishments ==
- Lucha Libre AAA Worldwide
  - AAA World Tag Team Championship (1 time) – with Raj Dhesi
