= Triplemanía XXIV =

2016 Lucha Libre AAA Worldwide event

- Official poster for Triplemanía
- Promotion: Lucha Libre AAA World Wide
- Date: August 28, 2016
- City: Mexico City
- Venue: Arena Ciudad de México
- Attendance: 14,000-22,000

Pay-per-view chronology
← Previous; Lucha Libre World	Next → Héroes Inmortales X

Triplemanía chronology
← Previous; XXIII	Next → XXV

Triplemanía XXIV was a professional wrestling pay-per-view event produced and scripted by the Mexican promotion Lucha Libre AAA World Wide (AAA). The event took place on August 28, 2016, and was held in the Arena Ciudad de México in Mexico City, Mexico. The event Was the 24th year in a row that AAA had held a Triplemanía show, and was the 31st show held under the Triplemanía banner since 1993. The annual Triplemanía show is AAA's biggest show of the year, serving as the culmination of major storylines and feature wrestlers from all over the world competing in what has been described as AAA's version of WrestleMania or their Super Bowl event.

A total of seven matches took place, with the main event being a Lucha de Apuestas, or "bet match" where Psycho Clown put his wrestling mask on the line and Pagano put his hair on the line, "betting" it on the outcome of the match. The AAA Latin American Championship was also defended on the show along with the AAA World Tag Team Championship and La Copa Triplemanía.

== Production ==
=== Background ===
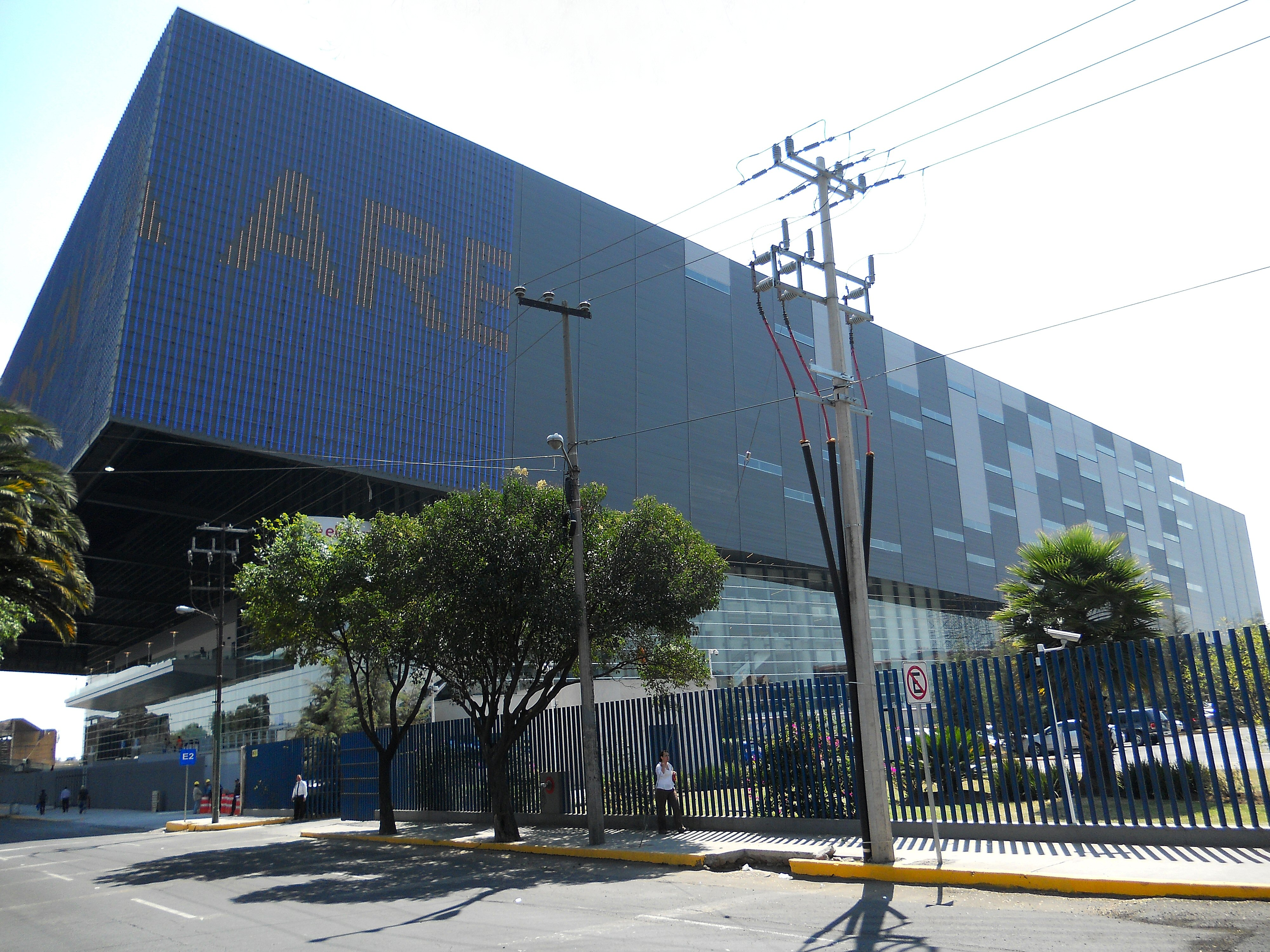
Outdoor view of the Arena Ciudad de México building.

2016 marked the 24th year since 1993 where the Mexican professional wrestling company Lucha Libre AAA World Wide (AAA) or Triple A held their annual Triplemanía show and the 31st Triplemanía show promoted by AAA, as they held multiple Triplemanía shows over the summers of 1994 to 1997. The 2016 event took place at the Arena Ciudad de México (Mexico City Arena), an indoor arena in Azcapotzalco, Mexico City, Mexico that has a maximum capacity of 22,300 spectators. This was the fifth consecutive Triplemanía (XX, XXI, XXII, and XXIII) held at the venue. AAA's Triplemanía is their biggest show of the year, the highlight of their year, AAA's equivalent of the WWE's WrestleMania or their Super Bowl event. AAA later confirmed that the show would be available as an internet pay-per-view (iPPV) with both Spanish and English language commentary, but not available through traditional PPV channels.

The Triplemanía was the first of three major shows held within a week of each other, produced by the three biggest lucha libre promotions in Mexico, AAA, Consejo Mundial de Lucha Libre (CMLL) and International Wrestling Revolution Group (IWRG). The second major lucha libre show, the CMLL 83rd Anniversary Show, will take place five days after Triplemanía on September 2 at Arena México where Psycho Clown's cousin La Máscara will risk his mask as well in a match against Dragon Lee. Finally the third-largest Mexican lucha libre promotion, IWRG will hold IWRG La Hora de la Verdad in Arena Naucalpan two days later on September 4, headlined by a Lucha de Apuestas, mask vs. mask match, between Trauma I and Canis Lupus.

=== Storylines ===
The Triplemanía XXIV show featured seven professional wrestling matches with different wrestlers involved in pre-existing scripted feuds, plots and storylines. Wrestlers portrayed either heels (referred to as rudos in Mexico, those that portray the "bad guys") or faces (técnicos in Mexico, the "good guy" characters) as they followed a series of tension-building events, which culminated in a wrestling match or series of matches.

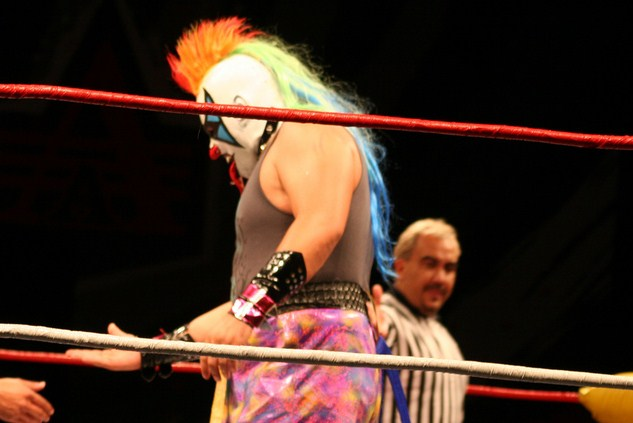
Psycho Clown, risking his clown mask in the main event.

After Pentagón Jr. won the 2016 Rey de Reyes tournament, he and the rest of Los Perros del Mal were attached by the team of Nicho El Millonario, Damián 666, Halloween and Pagano, claiming they were the "Real Perros del Mal", alluding to the fact that Nicho, Damián 666 and Halloween used to be part of the group. After the show Pagano confirmed that he had indeed signed with AAA. The group was initially known as La Nueva Familia Fronteriza, later shortened to simply La Familia Fronteriza ("The Border Family"). Bestia 666, son of Damián 666, was later added to the group. While the rest of La Familiar Fonteriza continued to work the storyline feud with Los Perros del Mal, Pagano moved off on a tangent, starting a storyline with Psycho Clown, an AAA wrestler who, like Pagano, used a clown ring character. Pagano made his official AAA in ring debut on April 18 as he, Pagano, Damián 666 and Nicho defeated Los Psycho Circus (Psycho Clown, Murder Clown and Monster Clown) by count-out. Subsequently Pagano and Psycho Clown faced off in a Hardcore wrestling match. During the match Pagano lit a wooden table on fire and then threw Psycho Clown through it to win the match. Two weeks later the two clashed again, this time in a match that also included Pentagón Jr., a match that was once again won by Pagano. After defeating Psycho Clown once more on July 8 and stealing Psycho Clown's wrestling mask, Pagano challenged Psycho Clown to put his mask on the line while Pagano would put up his hair in a Luchas de Apuestas, or "bet match". At the time Psycho Clown did not respond to the challenge. On July 16 AAA officially announced the match as the main event of Triplemanía XXIV on August 28.

The team of Averno and Chessman, also known as Los Hell Brothers won the vacant AAA World Tag Team Championship by defeating the teams of Aero Star/Fénix and Máscara Año 2000 Jr./Villano IV at the Guerra de Titanes show. Los Hell Brothers subsequently made several successful title defenses and began bragging about how there were no challengers left for them to deal with, that "no man" could defeat them. In the spring of 2016 sisters-turned-rivals Mari Apache and Faby Apache reunited as Mari returned to the tecnico side and started to team up with her sister on a regular basis. The two teamed up with their former step-mother Lady Apache and won the women's version of the 2016 Lucha Libre World Cup. Around the time of the World Cup Mari and Faby Apache challenged Los Hell Brothers, demanding that they put the tag team championship on the line, a challenge that Averno and Chessman turned down, acting very dismissing and sexist in the process. During the July 8 AAA Television taping Averno and Chessman dressed up as a pair of frumpy women as they mocked Los Apaches. At the subsequent taping Los Apaches distracted Averno and Chessman during a title defense against Jack Evans and Angélico, which lead to Averno and Chessman losing the tag team titles. Afterwards it was announced that Averno and Chessman had finally agreed to face Los Apaches at Triplemanía XXIV.

El Patrón Alberto defeated El Texano Jr. to win the AAA Mega Championship at the 2014 Guerra de Titanes show. Over the next year El Patrón defended the championship on several occasions, until he signed a contract with WWE in late 2015, which led to AAA announcing that since the WWE would not allow El Patrón to defend the championship it was vacated and they would hold a tournament to determine a new champion. At the 2016 Guerra de Titanes show El Mesías and El Texano Jr. defeated Dr. Wagner Jr. and Psycho Clown, earning the right to wrestle for the vacant AAA Mega Championship at a later date. At the subsequent Rey de Reyes show El Texano Jr. pinned El Mesias to become a two time AAA Mega Champion. In the weeks following Rey de Reyes El Texano Jr. was repeatedly attacked by El Mesisas and later on Brian Cage as well, slowly turning El Texano Jr. técnicos in the process. El Mesias, Brian Cage and Johnny Mundo all adopted an "Anti-Mexico" attitude, even naming themselves "Team Trump" after the US presidential candidate. On June 16, 2016 Dr. Wagner Jr. defeated El Mesias by disqualification to become the number one contender for the AAA Mega Championship, surprisingly inserting him into the championship feud. During an AAA press conference on July 28 and confirmed that El Texano Jr. would defend the AAA Mega Championship against both Dr. Wagner Jr. and Brian Cage, but El Mesias was not included.

On July 3, 2016 Pentagón Jr. defeated Psycho Clown to win the AAA Latin American Championship. The following week the team of Johnny Mundo, El Mesias and Hernandez defeated the trio of Pentagón Jr., El Texano Jr. and El Hijo del Fantasma when Mundo pinned Pentagón Jr. Following the match Mundo challenged Pentagón Jr. to defend the Latin American championship against Mundo since he just pinned the champion. On July 23 AAA announced that Pentagón Jr. would defend the AAA Latin American Championship against Johnny Mundo, acknowledging that the two had faced off before as part of Lucha Underground.

The second match of the night was announced as the second ever Copa Triplemanía with 12 wrestlers competing for the trophy. AAA confirmed 11 of the 12 names, La Parka, El Elegido, El Zorro, Daga, Taurus, El Hijo del Pirata Morgan, Pimpinela Escarlata, Mamba, Super Fly, Hernandez and Australian Suicide, but listed the 13th wrestler simply as a Luchador Sorpresa ("Surprise Wrestler").

== AAA Hall of Fame ==
First established in 2007 the AAA Hall of Fame has inducted one or two lucha libre-related people each year at Triplemanía. The initial class of the Hall of Fame included AAA founder Antonio Peña and Rey Misterio Jr. Later inductees have included Eddie Guerrero (2008), Pepe "Tropi" Casas (2009), Octagón (2011), Perro Aguayo (2012), Abismo Negro (2013), El Brazo (2014), Rayo de Jalisco Sr. (2014), Héctor Garza (2015), and El Hijo del Perro Aguayo (2015).

On August 18 the Récord sports newspaper revealed that "Love Machine" Art Barr was the first name confirmed for the 2016 AAA Hall of Fame, joining his former Los Gringos Locos partner Eddie Guerrero in the hall of fame. Barr is the first inductee who is not of Mexican heritage, being born in Portland, Oregon to US parents. Barr, son of local promoter Sandy Barr, had a storied career before ending up working in Mexico. Initially he worked as a local face character called Beetlejuice and was even offered a contract with World Championship Wrestling, but due to a statutory rape conviction he later found himself unable to get full-time work in the US. Moving to Mexico he first worked as the masked character "American Love Machine" for CMLL, but was unmasked by Blue Panther. He later jumped to AAA and formed a team with Eddie Guerrero known as "La Pareja del Terror" (The Pair of Terror) with Eddie Guerrero who won the AAA World Tag Team Championship. The duo, along with Konnan, would go on to form Los Gringos Locos, the most hated rudo team in Mexico at the time. Barr and Guerrero main evented AAA's AAA When Worlds Collide, their first US broadcast PPV, losing an Apuesta match to El Hijo del Santo and Octagón. Barr died only 17 days after When Worlds Collide, with the official cause never being clearly stated. The Récord article also confirmed that AAA was planning in inducing a second person in the hall of fame but did not name that person. During the show AAA also inducted Joaquín Roldán, who took control of AAA after Antonio Peña's death, into the Hall of Fame.

== Results ==
No.	Results	Stipulations
1	Australian Suicide defeated Daga by pinfall to win Also in the match: La Parka, El Elegido, El Zorro, Taurus, El Hijo del Pirata Morgan, Pimpinela Escarlata, Mamba, Super Fly, Hernandez and Argenis	2016 Copa Triplemanía, 12-man elimination match
2	Faby Apache and Mari Apache vs. Averno and Chessman ended in a no contest	Intergender tag team match
3	Drago and Aero Star defeated Los Güeros del Cielo (Angélico and Jack Evans) (c), Paul London and Matt Cross, Hijo del Fantasma and Garza Jr.	Four-way match for the AAA World Tag Team Championship
4	Johnny Mundo defeated Pentagón Jr. (c)	Singles match for the AAA Latin American Championship
5	Rey Mysterio Jr, Prince Puma and Aztec Dragon Jr defeated Marty Martinez, Matanza and Mil Muertes	Lucha Underground six-man tag team match
6	Texano Jr. (c) defeated Brian Cage, and Dr. Wagner Jr.	Three-way match for the AAA Mega Championship
7	Psycho Clown defeated Pagano	Lucha de Apuestas, mask vs. hair match
(c) / – the champion(s) heading into the match
