= AAA World Tag Team Championship =

Professional Wrestling tag team championship

AAA World Tag Team Championship (Campeonato en Parejas AAA)
- The center plate of the AAA World Tag Team Championship belt

Details
- Promotion: Lucha Libre AAA Worldwide
- Date established: March 18, 2007
- Current champions: The Wagner Brothers (El Hijo de Dr. Wagner Jr. and Galeno)
- Date won: September 13, 2026

Other names
- AAA/IWC World Tag Team Championship (1993–1994); AAA World Tag Team Championship (2007–present)
Statistics
- First champions: The Black Family (Dark Cuervo and Dark Ozz)
- Most reigns: As tag team (3 reigns): Dark Family; Los Güeros del Cielo; As individual (5 reigns): Joe Líder
- Longest reign: Los Lucha Bros (Fénix and Pentagón Jr.) (2nd reign, 853 days)
- Shortest reign: Los Lucha Bros (Fénix and Pentagón Jr.) (1st reign, 5 minutes)
- Oldest champion: Negro Casas (64 years, 153 days)
- Youngest champion: Komander (24 years, 156 days)

The AAA World Tag Team Championship (Campeonato en Parejas AAA in Spanish) is the main tag team title contested for in the Mexican promotion Lucha Libre AAA Worldwide (AAA), a sister promotion of WWE. The current champions are The Wagner Brothers (El Hijo de Dr. Wagner Jr. and Galeno), who are in their first reign as a team and individually. They won the titles by defeating The War Raiders (Erik and Ivar) in an Open Challenge on Night 2 of Triplemanía 34 on September 13, 2026.

== History ==
In 1993, AAA created the first version of the AAA World Tag team Championship, known as the AAA/IWC World Tag Team Championship. The championship was billed as being co-promoted by the International Wrestling Council (IWC), the promotional name used for AAA shows in the United States. The title belts used to represent the AAA/IWC World Tag Team Championship were the old NWA Pacific Northwest Tag Team Championship belts. The original version was abandoned upon Art Barr's death in 1994. In 2007, AAA created the modern version of the AAA World Tag team Championship as a new tag team title to replace the Comisión de Box y Lucha Libre Mexico D.F. controlled Mexican National Tag Team Championship.

== Reigns ==
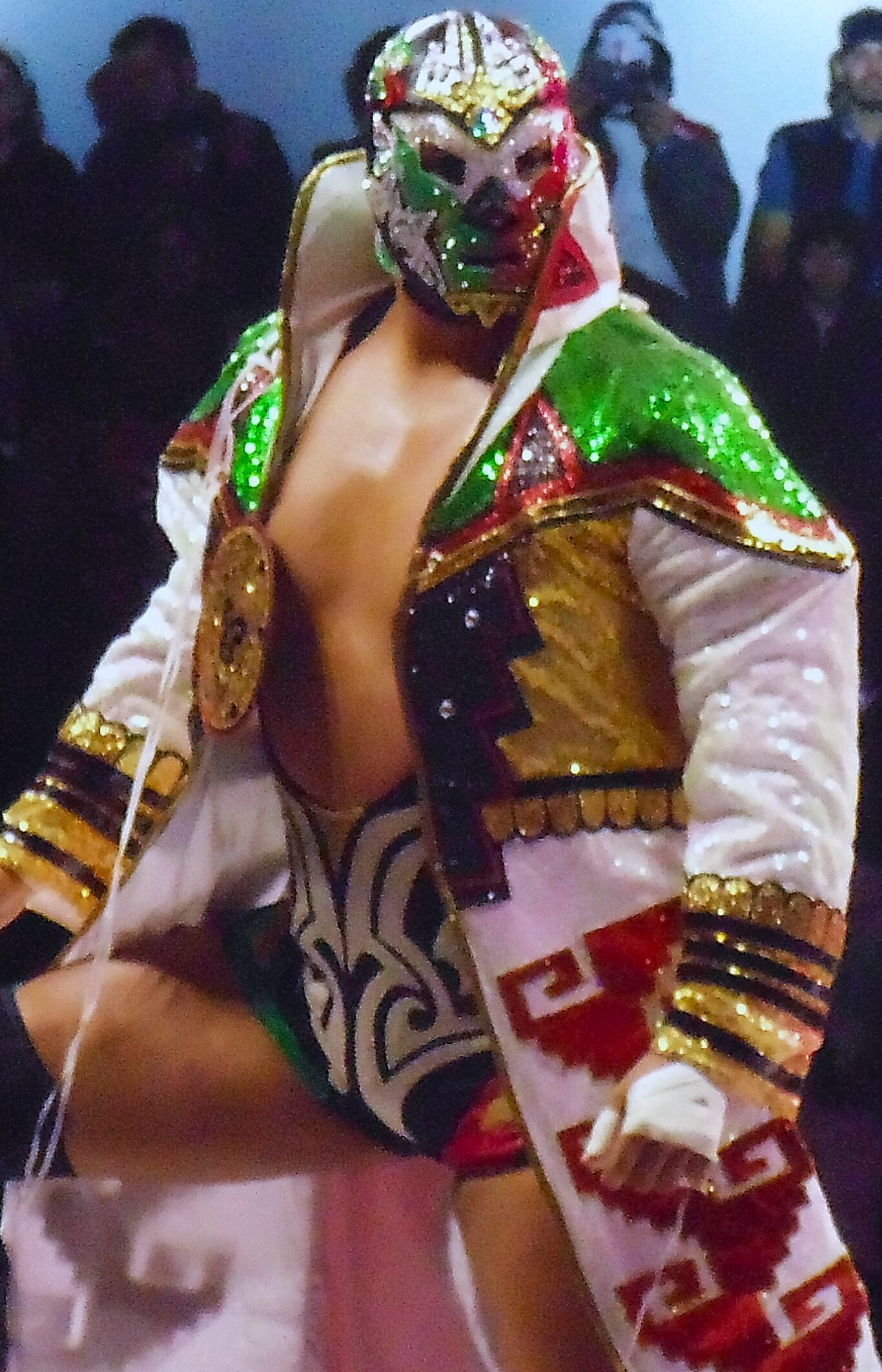
Current champions The Wagner Brothers (El Hijo de Dr. Wagner Jr. and Galeno)

Overall, there have been 37 reigns among 30 teams composed of 50 individual champions. The Black Family (Dark Cuervo and Dark Ozz) are the inaugural champions. The Dark Family (Cuervo and Scoria) and Los Güeros del Cielo (Angélico and Jack Evans) have the most reigns among tag teams with three, while Joe Lider has the most reigns among wrestlers with five. Los Lucha Bros (Fénix and Pentagón Jr.) hold the longest and shortest reigns with their second reign being the longest at 853 days and their first reign being the shortest at 5 minutes. Negro Casas is the oldest champion at 64 years and 153 days, while Komander is the youngest champion at 24 years and 156 days.

The Wagner Brothers (El Hijo de Dr. Wagner Jr. and Galeno) are the current champions in their first reign as a team and individually. They won the titles by defeating The War Raiders (Erik and Ivar) in an Open Challenge on Night 2 of Triplemanía 34 in Azcapotzalco, Mexico City, Mexico, on September 13, 2026.

Name	Years
AAA/IWC World Tag Team Championship	1993–1994
AAA World Tag Team Championship	2007–present

Key
No.	Overall reign number
Reign	Reign number for the specific team—reign numbers for the individuals are in parentheses, if different
Days	Number of days held
Days recog.	Number of days held recognized by the promotion

No.	Champion	Championship change			Reign statistics			Notes	Ref.
No.	Champion	Date	Event	Location	Reign	Days	Days recog.	Notes	Ref.
Lucha Libre AAA Worldwide (AAA) and International Wrestling Council (IWC)
†	El Hijo del Santo and Octagón	November 5, 1993	AAA	Tonalá, Jalisco, Mexico	—	260	—	Defeated La Pareja del Terror (Art Barr and Eddy Guerrero) in a 2-out-of-3 Falls match.	
†	La Pareja del Terror (Eddie Guerrero and "Love Machine" Art Barr)	July 23, 1994	AAA/IWC	Rosemont, Illinois, U.S.	—	123	—	This was a 2-out-of-3 Falls match.	
—	Vacated	November 23, 1994	—	—	—	—	—	Art Barr died.	
Lucha Libre AAA Worldwide (AAA)
1	The Black Family (Dark Cuervo and Dark Ozz)	March 18, 2007	Sin Limite: Rey De Reyes	Naucalpan, Mexico	1	119	119	Defeated Crazy Boy and Joe Líder, Alan Stone and Zumbido, and Pegasso and Super Fly in the four-way elimination tournament final to become the inaugural champion.	
2	Mexican Powers (Crazy Boy and Joe Líder)	July 15, 2007	Sin Limite: Triplemanía XV	Naucalpan, Mexico	1	287	294		
3	La Familia de Tijuana (Halloween and Extreme Tiger)	April 27, 2008	Sin Límite	Zapopan, Jalisco, Mexico	1	140	140	Aired on May 4.	
4	La Hermandad 187 (Joe Líder and Nicho el Millonario)	September 14, 2008	Sin Limite: Verano De Escándalo	Zapopan, Jalisco, Mexico	1 (2, 1)	551	567	This four-way ladder match also featured The Hart Foundation 2.0 (Jack Evans and Teddy Hart) and The Mexican Powers (Crazy Boy and Ultimo Gladiador). Aired on September 21.	
5	La Legión Extranjera (Taiji Ishimori and Takeshi Morishima)	March 19, 2010	Sin Límite	Mexico City, D.F., Mexico	1	65	48	Aired on April 11.	
6	Atsushi Aoki and Go Shiozaki	May 23, 2010	NOAH Navigation with Breeze (Night 2)	Niigata, Japan	1	14	8	Aired on May 29.	
7	Los Maniacos (Silver King and Último Gladiador)	June 6, 2010	Triplemanía XVIII	Mexico City, D.F., Mexico	1	288	315	This four-way elimination match also featured Beer Money, Inc. (James Storm and Robert Roode) and La Hermandad Extrema (Joe Lider and Nicho el Millonario).	
8	Extreme Tiger and Jack Evans	March 21, 2011	Sin Límite	León, Guanajuato, Mexico	1 (2, 1)	202	175	Aired on April 17.	
9	La Legión Extranjera (Abyss and Chessman)	October 9, 2011	Héroes Inmortales V	Monterrey, Nuevo León, Mexico	1	364	364	This was a Tables, Ladders, and Chairs match.	
10	Joe Líder and Vampiro	October 7, 2012	Heroes Inmortales VI	San Luis Potosí City, San Luis Potosí, Mexico	1 (3, 1)	227	227	This was a Hardcore match.	
—	Vacated	May 22, 2013	—	—	—	—	—		
11	Mexican Powers (Crazy Boy and Joe Líder)	June 16, 2013	Triplemanía XXI	Mexico City, D.F., Mexico	2 (2, 4)	124	139	Defeated Angélico and Jack Evans, Drago and Fénix, Los Mamitos (Mr. E and Sexy B), and Los Perros del Mal (Daga and Psicosis) in a five-way tag team elimination match to win the vacant title.	
12	Los Güeros del Cielo (Angélico and Jack Evans)	October 18, 2013	Sin Limite: Heroes Inmortales VII	Puebla, Puebla, Mexico	1 (1, 2)	415	400	This four-way elimination match also featured Aero Star and Drago and La Secta (Escoria and Espiritu). Aired on November 2.	
13	Los Perros del Mal (Joe Líder and Pentagón Jr.)	December 7, 2014	Guerra de Titanes	Zapopan, Jalisco, Mexico	1 (5, 1)	301	301	This three-way match also featured Fénix) and Myzteziz.	
14	Los Güeros del Cielo (Angélico and Jack Evans)	October 4, 2015	Héroes Inmortales IX	San Luis Potosí, San Luis Potosí, Mexico	2 (2, 3)	110	118	This three-way match also featured Daga and Steve Pain.	
—	Vacated	January 22, 2016	Sin Limite: Guerra De Titanes	Zapopan, Jalisco, Mexico	—	—	—	Angélico suffered a leg injury. Aired on January 30.	
15	Los Hell Brothers (Averno and Chessman)	January 22, 2016	Sin Limite: Guerra De Titanes	Zapopan, Jalisco, Mexico	1 (1, 2)	177	189	Defeated Aero Star and Fénix and Máscara Año 2000 Jr. and Villano IV in a three-way elimination match to win the vacant title. Aired on January 30.	
16	Los Güeros del Cielo (Angélico and Jack Evans)	July 17, 2016	Sin Límite	Oaxaca City, Mexico	3 (3, 4)	42	22	This three-way match also featured Los Psycho Circus (Monster Clown and Murder Clown). Aired on August 6.	
17	Aero Star and Drago	August 28, 2016	Triplemanía XXIV	Mexico City, D.F., Mexico	1	215	215	This four-way match also featured Paul London and Matt Cross and El Hijo del Fantasma and Garza Jr.	
18	Dark Family (Cuervo and Scoria)	March 31, 2017	AAA	Ciudad Nezahualcóyotl, Mexico	1 (2, 1)	56	56		
19	El Mesías and Pagano	May 26, 2017	AAA	Mexico City, Mexico	1	9	9		
20	Dark Family (Cuervo and Scoria)	June 4, 2017	Verano de Escándalo	Ciudad Juarez, Chihuahua, Mexico	2 (3, 2)	83	83	This four-way tag team match also featured Aero Star and Drago and Bengala and Australian Suicide.	
21	Los Totalmente Traidores (Monster Clown and Murder Clown)	August 26, 2017	Triplemanía XXV	Mexico City, Mexico	1	112	112	This four-way tag team match also featured Aero Star and Drago and DJZ and Andrew Everett.	
22	Dark Family (Cuervo and Scoria)	December 16, 2017	AAA	Apizaco, Tlaxcala, Mexico	3 (4, 3)	99	99	This three-way tag team match also featured Los Vipers (Psicosis and Histeria).	
23	Los Mercenarios (El Texano Jr. and Rey Escorpión)	March 25, 2018	AAA	Monterrey, Nuevo León, Mexico	1	356	356		
24	Los Lucha Bros (Fénix and Pentagón Jr.)	March 16, 2019	Rey de Reyes	Puebla, Puebla, Mexico	1 (1, 2)	<1	<1		
25	The Young Bucks (Matt Jackson and Nick Jackson)	March 16, 2019	Rey de Reyes	Puebla, Puebla, Mexico	1	92	92		
26	Los Lucha Bros (Fénix and Pentagón Jr.)	June 16, 2019	Verano de Escándalo	Merida, Yucatan, Mexico	2 (2, 3)	853	853	Defended the title as Rey Fénix and Penta El Zero M.	
27	FTR (Dax Harwood and Cash Wheeler)	October 16, 2021	Dynamite: Saturday Night Dynamite	Miami, Florida, U.S.	1	438	438	Won the title as luchadors called Las Super Ranas. They revealed themselves immediately after winning and defended the titles as FTR.	
28	Los Hermanos Lee (Dragon Lee and Dralístico)	December 28, 2022	Noche de Campeones	Acapulco, Guerrero, Mexico	1	<1	<1		
—	Vacated	December 28, 2022	—	—	—	—	—	Dragon Lee signed with WWE.	
29	Arez and Komander	May 20, 2023	AAA	Morelia, Michoacán, Mexico	1	183	189	Defeated Rey Horus and Octagón Jr. and Jack Evans and Myzteziz Jr. in a three-way tag team match to win the vacant titles.	
30	Nueva Generación Dinamita (Sansón and Forastero)	November 19, 2023	Guerra de Titanes	Ciudad Juárez, Chihuahua, Mexico	1	205	199		
31	Negro Casas and Psycho Clown	June 11, 2024	Origenes	Ciudad Juárez, Chihuahua, Mexico	1	67	67		
32	Team India (Raj Dhesi and Satnam Singh)	August 17, 2024	Triplemanía XXXII: Mexico City	Mexico City, Mexico	1	214	214	This three-way tag team match also featured La Dinastía Wagner (Dr. Wagner Jr. and Galeno del Mal).	
—	Vacated	March 19, 2025	—	—	—	—	—	AAA vacated the titles.	
33	Nueva Generación Dinamita (Sansón and Forastero)	March 22, 2025	Rey de Reyes	Mexico City, Mexico	2	85	85	Defeated Laredo Kid and Pagano and Jeff Jarrett and Sam Adonis in a three-way tag team match to win the vacant titles.	
34	Los Garza (Angel and Berto)	June 15, 2025	Triplemanía Regia III	Monterrey, Nuevo Leon, Mexico	1	62	62	This four-way tag team match also featured The Nemeth Brothers (Nic Nemeth and Ryan Nemeth) and Psycho Clown and Pagano.	
35	Pagano and Psycho Clown	August 16, 2025	Triplemanía XXXIII	Azcapotzalco, Mexico City, Mexico	1 (2, 2)	287	287	This was a Street Fight.	
36	War Raiders (Erik and Ivar)	May 30, 2026	Noche de Los Grandes	Monterrey, Nuevo León, Mexico	1	106	106		
37	The Wagner Brothers (El Hijo de Dr. Wagner Jr. and Galeno)	September 13, 2026	Triplemanía 34; Night 2	Azcapotzalco, Mexico City, Mexico	1	62+	62+	This was an Open Challenge.	

== Combined reigns ==
As of November 14, 2026.

†	Indicates the current champions

=== By team ===
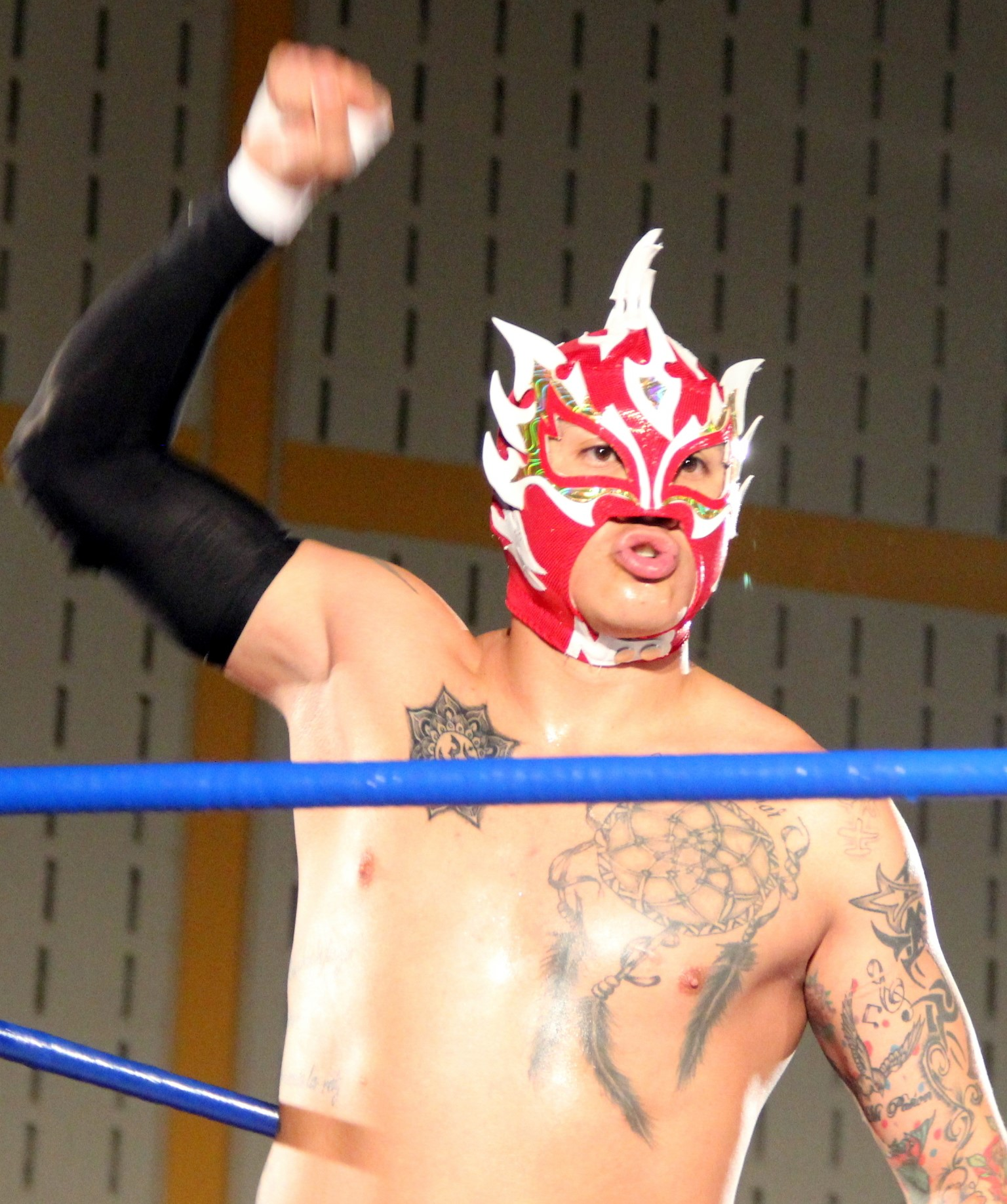
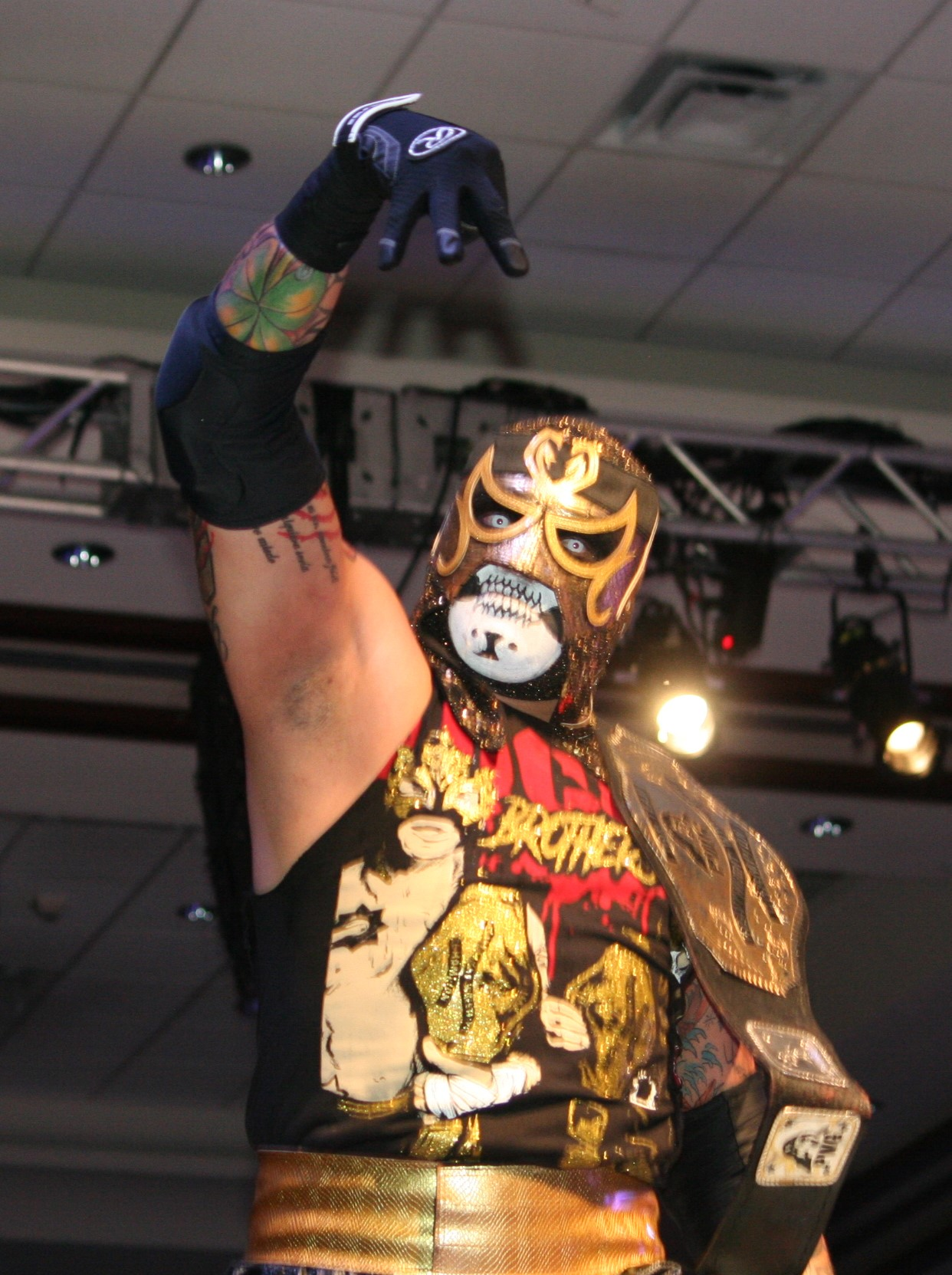
Two-time champions Los Lucha Bros (Fénix (left) and Pentagón Jr. (right)). Their second reign is the longest in the title's history at 853 days, while their first reign is the shortest at 5 minutes.
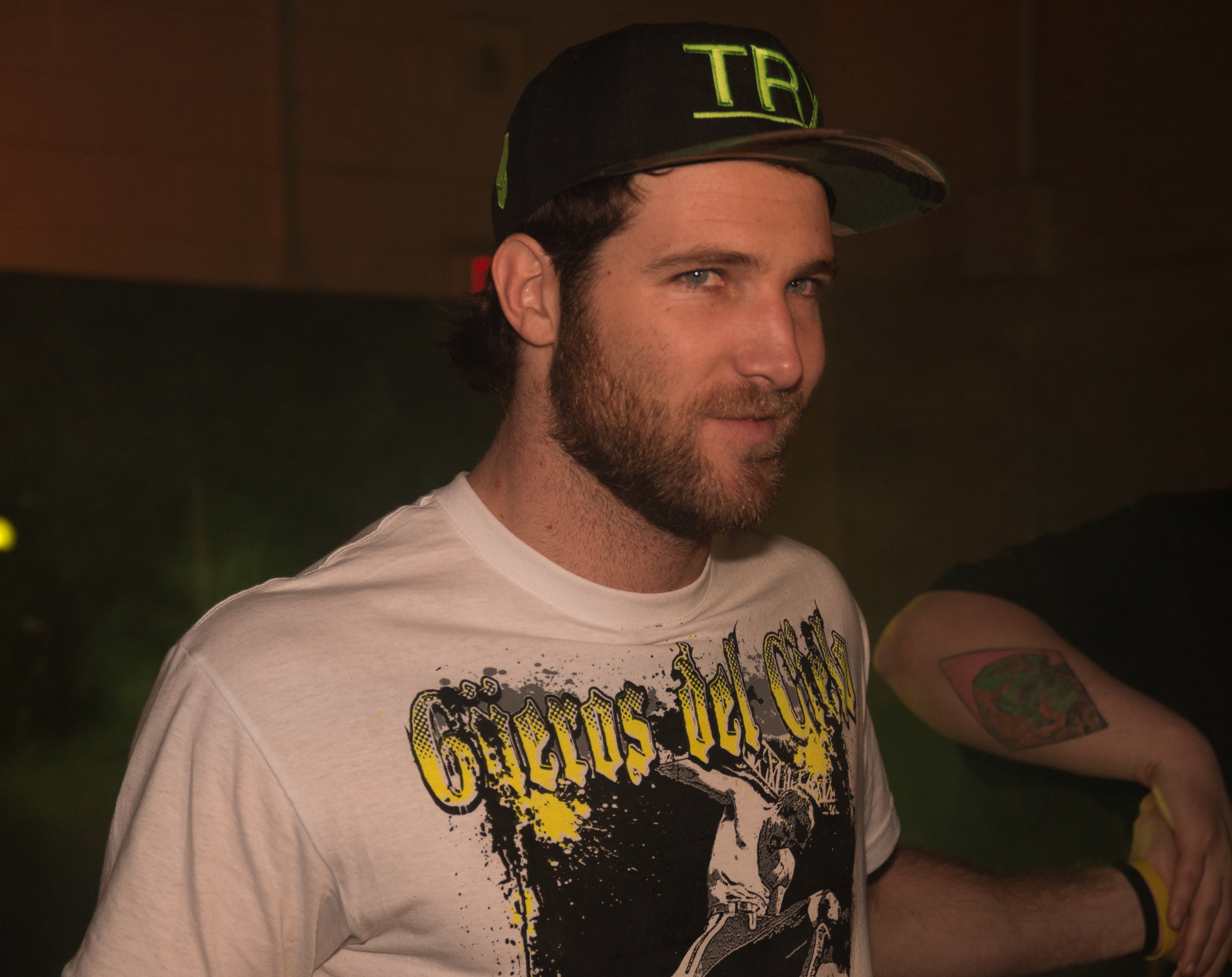
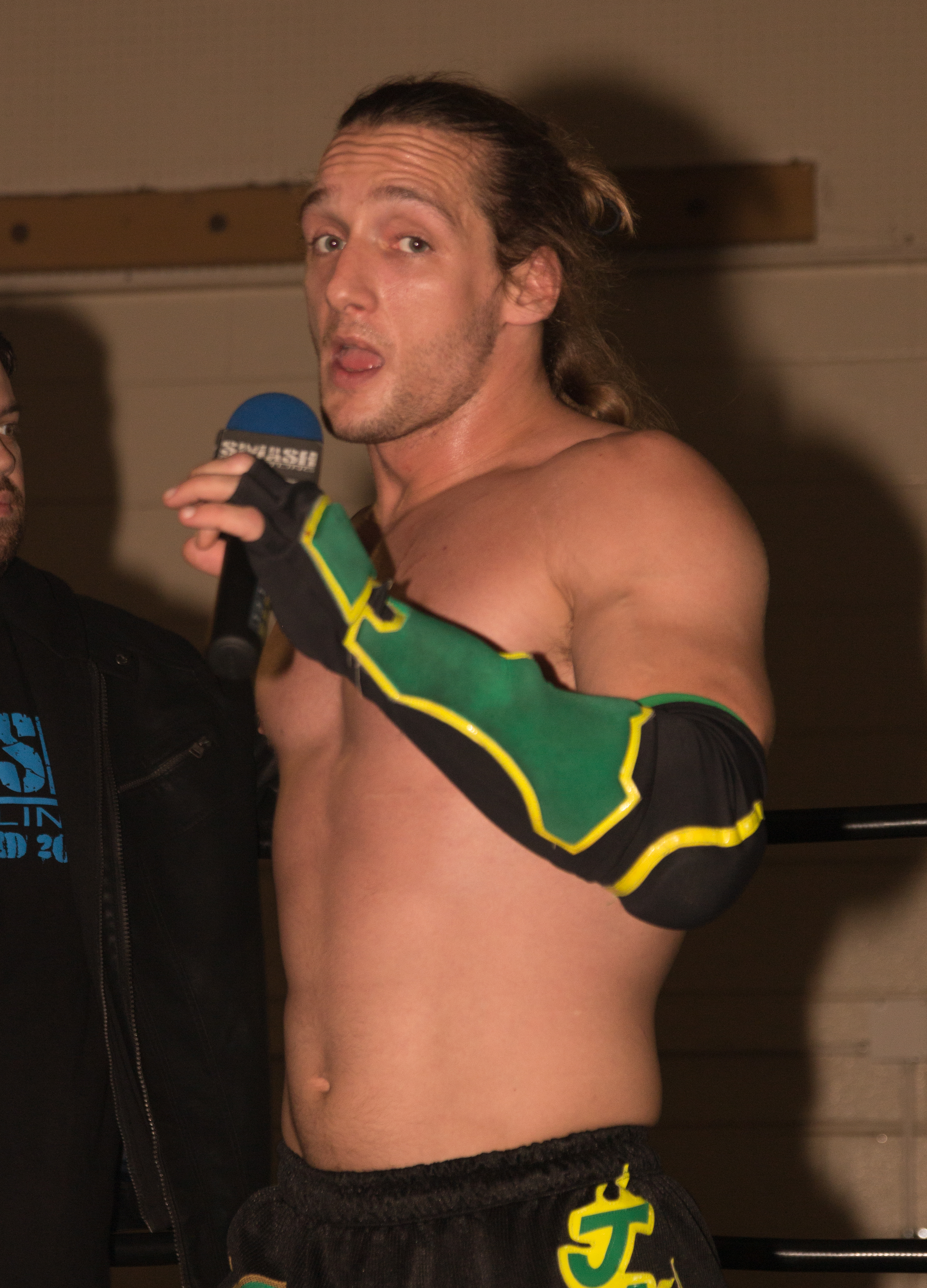
Los Güeros del Cielo (Angélico (left) and Jack Evans (right)) has the most reigns as a team with three.

Rank	Team	No. of reigns	Combined days	
Rank	Team	No. of reigns	Actual	Recognized by AAA
1	Los Lucha Bros (Fénix and Pentagón Jr.)	2	853	
2	Los Güeros del Cielo (Angélico and Jack Evans)	3	567	540
3	La Hermandad 187 (Joe Líder and Nicho el Millonario)	1	551	567
4	FTR (Dax Harwood and Cash Wheeler)	1	438	
5	Mexican Powers (Crazy Boy and Joe Líder)	2	411	433
6	La Legión Extranjera (Abyss and Chessman)	1	364	
7	Los Mercenarios (El Texano Jr. and Rey Escorpión)	1	356	
8	Los Perros del Mal (Joe Líder and Pentagón Jr.)	1	301	
9	Nueva Generación Dinamita (Sansón and Forastero)	2	290	284
10	Los Maniacos (Silver King and Último Gladiador)	1	288	315
11	Pagano and Psycho Clown	1	287	
12	Dark Family (Cuervo and Scoria)	3	238	
13	Joe Líder and Vampiro	1	227	
14	Aero Star and Drago	1	215	
15	Team India (Raj Dhesi and Satnam Singh)	1	214	
16	Extreme Tiger and Jack Evans	1	202	175
17	Arez and Komander	1	183	189
18	Los Hell Brothers (Averno and Chessman)	1	177	189
19	La Familia de Tijuana (Halloween and Extreme Tiger)	1	140	
20	The Black Family (Dark Cuervo and Dark Ozz)	1	119	
21	Los Totalmente Traidores (Monster Clown and Murder Clown)	1	112	
22	War Raiders (Erik and Ivar)	1	106	
23	The Young Bucks (Matt Jackson and Nick Jackson)	1	92	
24	Negro Casas and Psycho Clown	1	67	
25	La Legión Extranjera (Taiji Ishimori and Takeshi Morishima)	1	65	48
26	The Wagner Brothers † (El Hijo de Dr. Wagner Jr. and Galeno)	1	62+	
27	Los Garza (Angel and Berto)	1	62	
28	Atsushi Aoki and Go Shiozaki	1	14	8
29	El Mesías and Pagano	1	9	
30	Los Hermanos Lee (Dragon Lee and Dralístico)	1	<1	

=== By wrestler ===
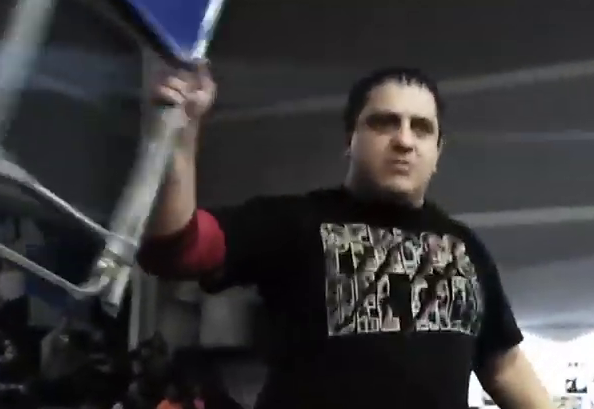
Joe Lider has the most individual reigns with five. He also has the most individual combined days at 1,490 days.

Rank	Wrestler	No. of reigns	Combined days	
Rank	Wrestler	No. of reigns	Actual	Recognized by AAA
1	Joe Líder	5	1,490	1,528
2	Pentagón Jr.	3	1,154	
3	Fénix	2	853	
4	Jack Evans	4	769	715
5	Angélico	3	567	540
6	Nicho el Millonario	1	551	567
7	Chessman	2	541	553
8	Cash Wheeler	1	438	
8	Dax Harwood	1	438	
10	Crazy Boy	2	411	433
11	Abyss	1	364	
12	Dark Cuervo/Cuervo	4	357	
13	El Texano Jr.	1	356	
13	Rey Escorpión	1	356	
15	Psycho Clown	2	354	
16	Extreme Tiger	2	342	315
17	Sansón	2	290	284
17	Forastero	2	290	284
19	Pagano	2	296	
20	Silver King	1	288	315
20	Último Gladiador	1	288	315
22	Scoria	3	238	
23	Vampiro	1	227	
24	Aero Star	1	215	
24	Drago	1	215	
26	Raj Dhesi	1	214	
26	Satnam Singh	1	214	
28	Arez	1	183	189
28	Komander	1	183	189
30	Averno	1	177	189
31	Halloween	1	140	
32	Dark Ozz	1	119	
33	Monster Clown	1	112	
33	Murder Clown	1	112	
35	Erik	1	106	
35	Ivar	1	106	
37	Matt Jackson	1	92	
37	Nick Jackson	1	92	
39	Negro Casas	1	67	
40	Taiji Ishimori	1	65	48
40	Takeshi Morishima	1	65	48
42	El Hijo de Dr. Wagner Jr. †	1	62+	
42	Galeno †	1	62+	
44	Angel	1	62	
44	Berto	1	62	
46	Atsushi Aoki	1	14	8
46	Go Shiozaki	1	14	8
48	El Mesías	1	9	
49	Dragon Lee	1	<1	
49	Dralístico	1	<1	

== See also ==
- List of current champions in Lucha Libre AAA Worldwide
- Tag team championships in WWE
