= Pagano (wrestler) =

Mexican professional wrestler

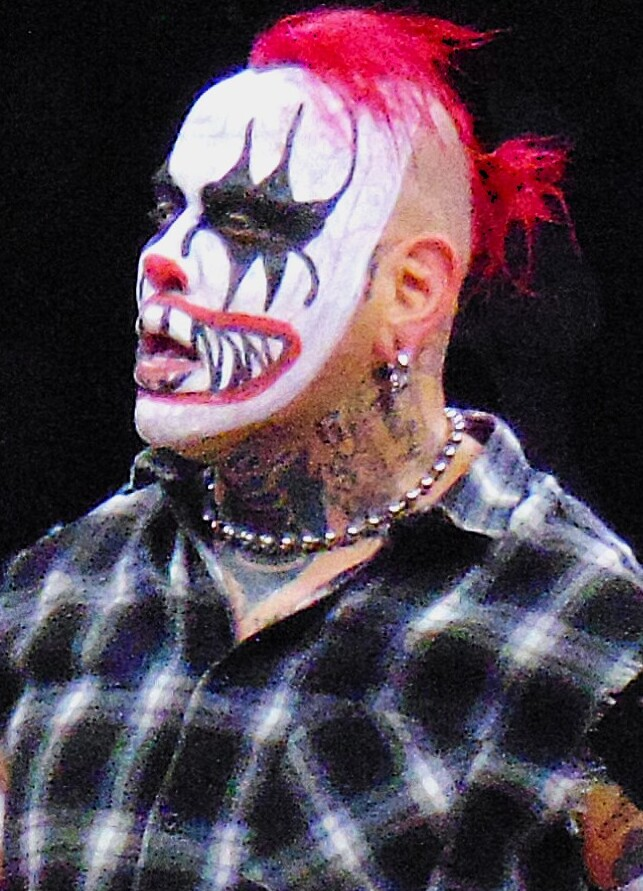
- Pagano in 2026

Personal information
- Born: José Julio Pacheco Hernández; February 7, 1986 (age 40) Ciudad Juárez, Chihuahua, México
- Website: www.facebook.com/PaganoLuchador

Professional wrestling career
- Ring name: Pagano
- Billed height: 185 cm (6 ft 1 in)
- Billed weight: 116 kg (256 lb)
- Billed from: Ciudad Juárez, Chihuahua, México
- Trained by: Aspid; Babe Sharon; Curtis Hughes
- Debut: 2008

José Julio Pacheco Hernández (born February 7, 1986), better known by his ring name Pagano, is a Mexican professional wrestler. He is signed with both Lucha Libre AAA Worldwide and WWE and is a former AAA World Tag Team Champion, with Psycho Clown. He originally worked primarily in and around his hometown of Juárez, Chihuahua but in recent years has worked throughout Mexico on the Independent circuit before joining AAA in 2016. His ring name is Spanish for "Pagan".

As Pagano, he primarily works a Hardcore wrestling style, which often includes the use of weapons and one or both wrestlers in the match bleeding profusely. Because of his preference for these types of matches, he has been given the nickname El Rey Extremo or "The Extreme King". Pagano was an enmascarado, or masked wrestler, until 2011 where he was forced to unmask. His ring character is that of a psychotic clown, originally wearing a mask that resembled clown make-up and after the mask loss, he wears face paint that resembles that of a clown. In 2016 he rose to national and international attention with his feud with Psycho Clown, slated to be the main event of Triplemanía XXIV, AAA's biggest annual show.

== Professional wrestling career ==
José Pacheco initially trained under Aspid and Babe Sharon at the local Arena Kalaka in Juárez. He made his debut in 2008, working as the masked wrestler character, Pagano. Early on he wore a generic mask but later began professional wrestling in a mask that resembled a clown's makeup instead. Initially he worked in Arena Kalaka, often in Hardcore wrestling matches, forming a group known as "Hardcore Pride" with Sick Boy, SKAM-13 and Murder Angel. In 2010 Pagano had the opportunity to travel to the United States, working for the Atlanta, Georgia-based Atlanta World Wrestling Alliance (WWA4), training under Curtis Hughes while in Atlanta. During his sting with WWA4 he won the New Latino Wrestling Mexicano Championship. Upon his return to Mexico he also began working for Nuevo Generacion Xtrema (NGX) based in Monterrey, Nuevo León. In December 2011 Pagano toured Panama, where he lost a Lucha de Apuestas, or "bet match", to local wrestler Luzbel and was forced to unmask as a result. When he returned to Mexico he lost yet another Lucha de Apuestas match, this time a steel cage match, to Scorpio 2000 and once again unmasked. While Lucha Libre has strict rules about Lucha de Apuestas matches the Chihuahua wrestling commission did not sanction Pacheco since the first mask loss happened outside of Mexico and thus was not governed by the wrestling commissions. Following the mask loss he began painting his face to resemble a clown for his matches.

By 2015 Pagano began working all over Mexico, being hired by various promotions on the Mexican independent circuit. During this time he developed a long-running storyline feud with veteran wrestler Nicho el Millonario. The two faced off on several different shows, often under hardcore stipulations such as "Extreme Rules" (No disqualification, weapons allowed), "Death Match" rules (only way to win is to knock your opponent out), "Bull Terrier" rules where the two wrestlers are chained together. Pagano would win the majority of their matches as they built to a Lucha de Apuestas, hair vs. hair match, between the two. That match, fought under Ladder match rules, took place on July 24, 2015, and saw Nicho defeat Pagano, forcing Pagano to get all his hair shaved off afterward. In October 2015 Pagano made his debut for Federacion Universal de Lucha Libre (FULL), working with lucha libre legends L.A. Park and Dr. Wagner Jr. He later worked for International Wrestling Revolution Group (IWRG) one of Mexico's longest-running promotions.

=== Lucha Libre AAA Worldwide (2016–present) ===
At AAA's 2016 Rey de Reyes show Pagano, alongside Nicho El Milionario, Damián 666 and Halloween made a surprise appearance, attacking Pentagón Jr. moments after he had won the Rey de Reyes tournament. The group announced that they were the "Real" Perros del Mal, not the group that Pentagón Jr. was part of. After the show Pagano confirmed that he had indeed signed with AAA, marking the first time he had a full-time contract with a promotion. The group was initially known as La Nueva Familia Fronteriza, later shortened to simply La Familia Fronteriza ("The Border Family"). Bestia 666, son of Damián 666, was later added to the group. While the rest of La Familiar Fonteriza continued to work the storyline feud with Los Perros del Mal, Pagano moved off on a tangent, starting a storyline with Psycho Clown, an AAA wrestler who, like Pagano, used a clown ring character. Pagano made his official AAA in-ring debut on April 18 as he, Damián 666 and Nicho defeated Los Psycho Circus (Psycho Clown, Murder Clown and Monster Clown) by count-out. Subsequently, Pagano and Psycho Clown faced off in a Hardcore wrestling match. During the match Pagano lit a wooden table on fire and then threw Psycho Clown through it to win the match. Two weeks later the two clashed again, this time in a match that also included Pentagón Jr., a match that was once again won by Pagano. After defeating Psycho Clown once more on July 8 and stealing Psycho Clown's wrestling mask, Pagano challenged Psycho Clown to put his mask on the line while Pagano would put up his hair in a Luchas de Apuestas, or "bet match". At the time Psycho Clown did not respond to the challenge. On July 16, AAA officially announced the match as the main event of Triplemanía XXIV on August 28. Pagano went on to lose the match and his hair. On October 2 at Héroes Inmortales X, Psycho Clown's Los Psycho Circus partners Monster Clown and Murder Clown turned on him and joined up with Pagano.

On May 26, 2017, Pagano won his first title in AAA, when he and El Mesías captured the AAA World Tag Team Championship. At Verano de Escándalo, Mesias and Pagano lost the titles back to Cuervo and Scoria. The match also included Drago, Aerostar, Bengala and Australian Suicide. After the team's loss, Mesias went furious, attacking Pagano so much he had to be taken out of the ring on a stretcher, turning Pagano tecnico (lucha libre's term for the faces). On a TV taping, Pagano teamed with former rival Psycho Clown and El Hijo del Fantasma. They faced and lost to Dr. Wagner Jr., Mesías and Kevin Kross after interference from Texano Jr. (who Fantasma was feuding with). It was later announced that at Triplemanía XXV, Pagano would face Mesias in a Street Fight which suited Pagano as Pagano has a large experience in hardcore matches. Mesias's most recent street fight was in 2008 at Verano de Escandalo in a steel cage where he lost to Vampiro. The match ended in a no contest after Rey Escorpión returned and attacked both Mesías and Pagano.

On July 21 at the event AAA vs. Elite, Pagano teamed up with Joe Líder as representatives of team AAA being defeated by the team Elite (Teddy Hart and Jack Evans), during the match Hart applied a Canadian Destroyer on the edge of the ring to Pagano, but it fell out of ring causing a concussion.

At Noche de Los Grandes Week 1, Pagano and Psycho Clown would lose the AAA World Tag Team Championship to the War Raiders. After the match, Pagano would walk away from Psycho Clown and let the War Raiders beat him down.

=== Impact Wrestling (2017–2018) ===
After a match between Ethan Carter III and El Hijo del Fantasma, Pagano made his debut attacking Carter before Eddie Edwards made the save.

== Mixed martial arts career ==
On March 7, 2014, Pacheco made his Mixed Martial Arts (MMA) debut, fighting under the name "Pagano" on a Combate Real show in his native Juárez. He defeated Juan Carlos Riquelme by knock out in the first round.

== Championships and accomplishments ==
- Alianza Universal De Lucha Libre
  - Copa 90.Universo Tournament (2023)
- Atlanta World Wrestling Alliance
  - AWWA Mexicano Heavyweight Championship (1 time)
- Lucha Libre AAA Worldwide
  - AAA World Tag Team Championship (2 times) – with El Mesías (1) and Psycho Clown (1)
  - Copa Antonio Peña (2018)
  - Lucha Libre World Cup (2017) – with Psycho Clown
  - Copa Aficion (2017)
  - Copa Triplemanía XXVII
- Mexican Xtreme Wrestling
  - MXW Mixed Tag Team Championship (1 time) – with Ludark Shaitan
- Nueva Generacion Xtrema
  - NGX Extreme Championship (1 time)
  - King of Deathmatch Tournament (2025)
- Pro Wrestling Illustrated
  - Ranked No. 57 of the top 500 singles wrestlers in the PWI 500 in 2021
- Wrestling Association of Reynosa City
  - WAR City Extreme Championship (1 time)
- American independent circuit
  - Texas Hardcore Heavyweight Championship (1 time)
  - Texas Hardcore Tag Team Championship (1 time) – with Pantera Asesina
- Mexican independent circuit
  - Arena Gladiador Extreme Championship (1 time)
  - Guerra De Empresas Tournament (2013) – with Drastik Boy

== Luchas de Apuestas record ==
Winner (wager)	Loser (wager)	Location	Event	Date	Notes
Luzbel (mask)	Pagano (mask)	Panama City, Panama	House show	December 2, 2011	
Scorpio 2000 (hair)	Pagano (mask)	Juárez, Chihuahua	House show	December 18, 2011	(Note: Pagano lost his mask again only weeks after losing it in Panama.)
Muñeco Infernal (hair)	Pagano (hair)	Juárez, Chihuahua	House show	September 9, 2012	
Aéreo (Note: Not the same Aéreo who works for Consejo Mundial de Lucha Libre) (mask)	Pagano (hair)	Juárez, Chihuahua	House show	December 25, 2013	
Nicho El Milonario (hair)	Pagano (hair)	Tijuana, Baja California	House show	July 24, 2015	(Note: This was a ladder match between the two.)
Psycho Clown (mask)	Pagano (hair)	Mexico City	Triplemanía XXIV	August 28, 2016	
Pagano (hair)	Joe Líder (hair)	Ciudad Nezahualcóyotl, Mexico State	Live event	January 1, 2017	(Note: Last two wrestlers in a steel cage match that also included Hijo de Pirata Morgan, El Texano Jr., Averno and Chessman)
Pagano (hair)	Histeria 2.0 (hair)	Mazatlan, Sinaloa, Mexico	AAA show	August 18, 2019	(Note: Three way match that also included Chessman)
Pagano (hair)	Chessman (hair)	Mexico City	Triplemanía XXVIII	December 12, 2020	
Pagano (hair)	Cibernético (hair)	Mexico City	Triplemanía XXX: Mexico City	October 15, 2022	

== Mixed martial arts record ==
Professional record breakdown
1 match	1 win	0 losses
By knockout	1	0
By submission	0	0
By decision	0	0

Res.	Record	Opponent	Method	Event	Date	Round	Time	Location	Notes
Win	1–0	Juan Carlos Riquelme	Knock Out (punches)	Combate Real	March 7, 2014	1	4:10	Juárez, Chihuahua, Mexico	
