= Pimpinela Escarlata =

Mexican professional wrestler (born 1969)

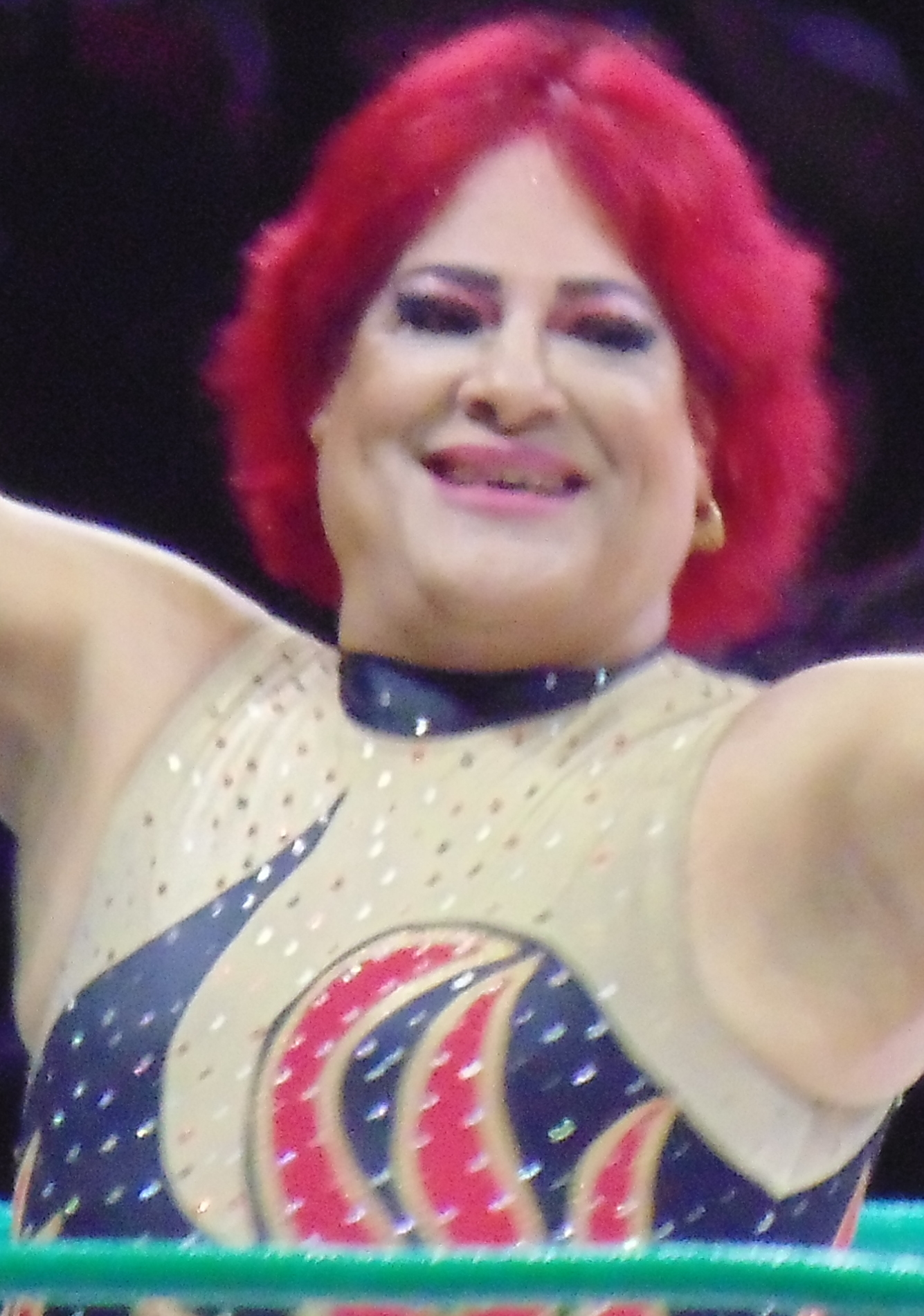
- Pimpinela Escarlata in 2026

Personal information
- Born: Mario González Lozano; April 18, 1969 (age 57) Delicias, Chihuahua, México

Professional wrestling career
- Ring name(s): Fly Boy; Pantera Rosa; Pimpinela Escarlata
- Billed height: 175 cm (5 ft 9 in)
- Billed weight: 85 kg (187 lb)
- Billed from: Torreón, Coahuila, México
- Trained by: Halcón Suriano; Héctor López
- Debut: June 15, 1988

Mario González Lozano (born April 18, 1969) is a Mexican professional wrestler, who works as an exótico for the Mexican Lucha Libre AAA World Wide promotion under the ring name Pimpinela Escarlata. As Escarlata he is a former AAA Reina de Reinas Champion, IWC World Hardcore Championship, Mexican National Middleweight Champion and AAA World Mixed Tag Team Champion. His ring name is Spanish for "The Scarlet Pimpernel" and is taken from the fictional character of the same name.

== Professional wrestling career ==
González began his professional wrestling career in 1988, initially working under the ring name Pantera Rosa (Spanish for "the Pink Panther") and later on briefly worked as Fly Boy. González was a fan of such Exotico wrestlers as Adorable Rubí and Sergio El Hermoso growing up and decided to become an exótico himself. He chose the name "Pimpinela Escarlata" ("The Scarlet Pimpernel") and started to wrestle dressed more like a woman, complete with make-up while acting more effeminate towards his male competitors. González's Pimpinela Escarlata character is credited with bringing the Exotico gimmick back to the spotlight after years of obscurity. In the early 1990s he began working for Empresa Mexicana de Lucha Libre (EMLL) but EMLL's very conservative view on wrestling coupled with Escarlata's Exotico character cut the EMLL tenure short. In 1992 EMLL booker Antonio Peña left EMLL to form Lucha Libre AAA World Wide, a wrestling promotion that was less conservative than CMLL. While Escarlata was not part of AAA from the very beginning he did make his AAA debut less than a year after it was created.

In AAA Escarlata often teamed with or feuded against other exotico wrestlers including as May Flowers. His first appearance at a major AAA show came on May 27, 1994 at Triplemanía II-C when he teamed up with Flowers and Rudy Reyna, only to lose to the trio of Super Amigo, El Plumo, and Depredator in the opening match. The following year Escarlata and May Flowers teamed up with the rúdo (bad guy) group Los Destructores (Tony Arce, Vulcano, Rocco Valente) to defeat a team known as Los Power Raiders (patterned after the Power Rangers; Raider Rojo, Raider Blanco, Raider Negro and Raider Azur) during Triplemanía III-C. González's in-ring skills and overall charisma meant that the Pimpinela Escarlata character became more successful than most Exotico characters. At Triplemanía IV-B he was one of the participants in a Torneo cibernetico for the newly created AAA Campeon de Campeones Championship, meant to be the highest ranking title in AAA. The match also included Perro Aguayo, Konnan, Juventud Guerrera, El Pantera, Psicosis, Villano III, and the eventual winner Pierroth, Jr. On May 20, 1996, Pimpinela Escarlata defeated La Parka to win the Mexican National Light Heavyweight Championship, making him the first Exotico to win a major Mexican title since Adorable Rubí won the Mexican National Middleweight Championship in 1976. His reign was short lived as Latin Lover won the title from him on September 9, 1996.

In 2000 Escarlata formed a group called Los Exoticos, the first all-Exotico stable in AAA, which consisted of himself, Sexy Francis, May Flowers, and Polvo de Estrellas. On April 27, 2001, Escarlata defeated Espectro, Jr. to win the Mexican National Middleweight Championship. At Triplemanía IX Exoticos Escarlata, May Flowers and Polvo de Estrellas defeated Blue Demon, Jr., Hijo del Solitario, and Oscar Sevilla in the second match of the night. During the summer of 2001 Pimpinela Escarlata began a storyline with female wrestler Tiffany, a feud that saw the two face off in the first "Exotico vs. female" Lucha de Apuesta, hair vs. hair match. The match took place at the 2001 Verano de Escandalo and ended in a draw, which meant both had their hair shaved off after the match. At the 2001 Guerra de Titanes event Pimpinela Escarlata wrestled in one of the first ever Relevos Atómicos de locura match (Spanish for "Eight-man madness match"), a match that featured two teams of four, each comprising a male wrestler, a female wrestler, an Exotico wrestler and a Mini-Estrella each. Escarlata, El Zorro (Male), Octagóncito (Mini), and Lady Apache (Female) defeated Electroshock (Male), Polvo de Estrellas, Mini Psicosis (Mini) and Tiffany (Female). On August 13, 2002, after an almost 16-month reign Escarlata lost the Mexican National Middleweight title to Psicosis II. After teaming with fellow Exotico Cassandro for a number of years the two split up and began feuding, resulting in a match at Triplemanía XIV in which the team of Escarlata, La Fiera, Mocho Cota, and Sangre Chicana went to a no contest with Casandro, El Brazo, Espectro, Jr. and Pirata Morgan due to the match being too out of control. On September 3, 2007, Pimpinela Escarlata was one of the AAA representatives that travelled to Japan to wrestle on a joint AAA/Pro Wrestling Noah event called TripleSEM. He teamed up with El Oriental and Chikayo Nagashima to defeat Cassandro, Takashi Sugiura and Faby Apache. In mid-2009 Pimpinela Escarlata developed a storyline interest in wrestler Gato Eveready, making several romantics overtures toward him, with Gato Eveready quickly backing away from Escarlata, stating that he had no romantic interests in another man. The storyline played out over several months on AAA television, until it was abruptly dropped late in the year. At AAA's Heroes Inmortales III, held on September 26, 2009, Escarlata was one of 13 men who participated in the Copa Antonio Peña Battle Royal, but was eliminated early in the match.

Pimpinela's attention turned from Gato Eveready towards Dr. Wagner, Jr., although his interest was less "personal"; instead he wanted to join Dr. Wagner, Jr.'s group Los Wagnermaniacos, a group that besides Wagner himself consisted of Silver King, Electroshock, and Último Gladiador. Los Wagnermaniacos did not want Escarlata to be a part of their group, attacking Escarlata after Los Wagnermaniacos lost a match to Escarlata, Extreme Tiger, and El Elegido at the 2009 Guerra de Titanes. At the following event Los Wagnermaniacos agreed to let Pimpinela Escarlata join his team if he could find two partners and defeat Dr. Wagner, Jr., Silver King and Último Gladiador. With the help of La Hermandad 187 (Nicho and Joe Líder) Escarlata pinned Último Gladiador to earn a spot in Los Wagnermaniacos. Following Rey de Reyes, the rest of Los Wagnermaniacos turned on Dr. Wagner, Jr. to form their own group Los Maniacos. Dr. Wagner, Jr. finally accepted the help of Pimpinela Escarlata and together with Octagón formed a new version of Los Wagnermaniacos. On October 1, 2010, at Héroes Inmortales IV Escarlata and Faby Apache defeated Alex Koslov and Christina Von Eerie to win the AAA World Mixed Tag Team Championship. They lost the title to Alan Stone and Jennifer Blake on March 13, 2011.

On July 31, 2011, at Verano de Escándalo, Escarlata defeated seven women to win the AAA Reina de Reinas Championship, AAA's women's championship. On August 19, four other exoticos, Nygma, Pasión Cristal, Polvo de Estrellas, and Yuriko, jealous over Escarlata's recent success, formed an alliance by attacking him after a match. On October 9 at Héroes Inmortales, the group once again attacked Escarlata, before being chased out of the ring by the returning Cassandro. On November 5, Escarlata and Cassandro were joined by El Brazo, who debuted his exotico persona "La Braza". On December 16 at Guerra de Titanes, Escarlata lost the Reina de Reinas Championship to Sexy Star in a lumberjack match. On March 18 at Rey de Reyes, Escarlata took part in a twelve-person steel cage Hair vs. Mask match, which eventually came down to him and Sexy Star. In the end, Sexy Star managed to escape the cage, forcing Escarlata to have his head shaved. On November 27, Escarlata took part in a special event co-produced by AAA and Japan's Pro Wrestling Wave in Korakuen Hall in Tokyo. During the event, Escarlata teamed with Fénix and Lolita in a six-person tag team match, where Ayako Hamada, Bachiko, and Cima defeated them.

On December 3, 2014 on Lucha Underground, Escarlata defeated Son of Havoc with the help of Mascarita Sagrada. He continued to work for Lucha Underground until 2016.

== Championships and accomplishments ==
- Lucha Libre AAA World Wide
  - AAA Reina de Reinas Championship (1 time)
  - AAA World Mixed Tag Team Championship (1 time) – with Faby Apache
  - IWC World Hardcore Championship (1 time)
  - Mexican National Light Heavyweight Championship (1 time)
  - Mexican National Middleweight Championship (1 time)
  - Copa Antonio Peña: 2016 and 2021
- International Wrestling Revolution Group
  - Guerra de Empresas (April 2011) – with Nicho el Millonario
- Mexican independent circuit
  - Pista Arena Revolucion Welterweight Championship (1 time)
  - IWA Light Heavyweight Championship (1 time)
- RGR Lucha Libre
  - RGR Exotico Championship (1 time, current)
- Pro Wrestling Illustrated
  - PWI ranked him #265 of the 500 best singles wrestlers of the PWI 500 in 2000

== Luchas de Apuestas record ==
| Winner (wager) | Loser (wager) | Location | Event | Date | Notes |
|---|---|---|---|---|---|
| Pimpinela Escarlata and Cassandro (hair) | Dragones Chinos I and II (masks) | N/A | Live event | N/A | |
| Pimpinela Escarlata and Cassandro (hair) | Dragones Chinos I and II (hair) | N/A | Live event | N/A | |
| Latin Lover (hair) | Pimpinela Escarlata (hair) | Monterrey, Nuevo León | Live event | N/A | |
| Villano V (mask) | Pimpinela Escarlata (hair) | Ciudad Mante, Tamaulipas | Live event | N/A | |
| Pimpinela Escarlata (hair) | Bello Greco (hair) | N/A | Live event | N/A | |
| Pimpinela Escarlata (hair) | Bello David (hair) | N/A | Live event | N/A | |
| Pimpinela Escarlata and May Flowers (hair) | Los Cachorros (mask) | N/A | Live event | N/A | |
| Pimpinela Escarlata and May Flowers (hair) | Dragones Chinos I and II (hair) | N/A | Live event | N/A | |
| Pimpinela Escarlata (hair) | Rocky Santana (hair) | Nezahualcoyotl, State of Mexico | Live event | February 19, 1993 | |
| Sergio Romo, Jr. (hair) | Pimpinela Escarlata (hair) | Monterrey, Nuevo León | Live event | April 23, 1995 | |
| Pimpinela Escarlata (hair) | Volador (hair) | Nuevo Laredo, Tamaulipas | Live event | July 28, 1997 | (Note: Volador had already adopted a new masked persona (Super Parka) and was suspended from wrestling in Mexico City by the wrestling commission.) |
| Pimpinela Escarlata (hair) | Green Ghost (mask) | Nuevo Laredo, Tamaulipas | Live event | 1999 | |
| Tarzan Boy (hair) | Pimpinela Escarlata (hair) | Monterrey, Nuevo León | Live event | February 14, 1999 | |
| Pimpinela Escarlata (hair) | Mosco de la Merced (hair) | Nuevo Laredo, Tamaulipas | Live event | April 10, 1999 | |
| Tarzan Boy (hair) | Pimpinela Escarlata | Monterrey, Nuevo León | Live event | November 15, 1999 | |
| Damián 666 (hair) | Pimpinela Escarlata (hair) | Nuevo Laredo, Tamaulipas | Live event | August 7, 2000 | |
| Pimpinela Escarlata (hair) | El Indomable (mask) | Reynosa, Tamaulipas | Live event | March 25, 2001 | (Note: Relevos suicida match: lost to Picudo and Silver Cat) |
| Draw | Tiffany (hair); Pimpinela Escarlata (hair) | Naucalpan, State of Mexico | Verano de Escándalo | September 16, 2001 | (Note: Wrestled to a draw, both wrestlers lost their hair) |
| Pimpinela Escarlata (hair) | Polvo de Estrellas (hair) | Torreón, Coahuila | Live event | April 19, 2002 | (Note: Steel Cage match that also included May Flowers and Los Barrio Boys (Billy Boy, Alan and Decnnis)) |
| Pimpinela Escarlata and Hijo del Enfermero (hair) | Jerry Estrada and Misterioso (hair) | Tijuana, Baja California | Live event | October 4, 2002 | |
| Héctor Garza (hair) | Pimpinela Escarlata (hair) | Monterrey, Nuevo León | Live event | July 6, 2003 | |
| Hator (hair) | Pimpinela Escarlata (hair) | Reynosa, Tamaulipas | Live event | November 18, 2003 | |
| Pimpinela Escarlata (hair) | Sexy Francis (hair) | Nuevo Laredo, Tamaulipas | Live event | August 23, 2004 | |
| Pimpinela Escarlata (hair) | Sexy Francis (hair) | Monterrey, Nuevo León | Live event | July 24, 2005 | (Note: Steel Cage match that also included Sexy Piscis) |
| Pimpinela Escarlata (hair) | Rey Sagitario (hair) | Monterrey, Nuevo León | Live event | March 28, 2010 | |
| Pimpinela Escarlata (hair) | Black Mamba (mask) | Nuevo Laredo, Tamaulipas | Live event | April 12, 2010 | |
| Pimpinela Escarlata (hair) | Orquídea Negra (hair) | Monterrey, Nuevo León | Live event | August 21, 2011 | |
| Sexy Star (mask) | Pimpinela Escarlata (hair) | Zapopan, Jalisco | Rey de Reyes | March 18, 2012 | (Note: Twelve-person steel cage match.) |
| Mamba (hair) | Pimpinela Escarlata (hair) | Tepic, Nayarit | Live event | Guerra de Titanes December 8, 2013 | (Note: Eight person steel cage match.) |
| Pimpinela Escarlata (hair) | Mamba (hair) | Ciudad Juárez, Chihuahua | Verano de Escándalo | June 4, 2016 | |

== See also ==
- List of exóticos
