= Verano de Escándalo (2019) =

2019 Lucha Libre AAA Worldwide event

- Poster
- Promotion: Lucha Libre AAA Worldwide
- Date: June 16, 2019
- City: Merida, Yucatán, Mexico
- Venue: Poliforum Zamná

Event chronology
| ← Previous; Rey de Reyes | Next → Triplemanía XXVII |

Verano de Escándalo chronology
| ← Previous; 2018 | Next → 2021 |

Verano de Escándalo (2019) (Spanish for "Summer of Scandal") was a major professional wrestling event produced by the Mexican Lucha Libre AAA Worldwide (AAA) promotion event, which took place on June 16, 2019 in Poliforum Zamná in Merida, Yucatán, Mexico. The Verano de Escándalo event has been a regular summer event for AAA since 1997, only skipping the event in 2012, 2013 and 2016. 2019 marking the 20th time AAA has used that name for an event.

== Production ==
=== Background ===
In September 1997 Mexican professional wrestling, company Asistencia Asesoría y Administración, later known as "AAA", or Triple A and then Lucha Libre AAA Worldwide added a new major event to their schedule as they held the first ever Verano de Escándalo ("Summer of Scandal") show on September 14, 1997. The Verano de Escándalo show became an annual event from 1997 until 2011, usually held in September, with few exceptions. In 2012 AAA changed their major event schedule as they pushed Triplemanía XX to August instead of holding the show in June or July as had been the case up until 2012. With the change to the schedule AAA did not hold a Verano de Escándalo show in 2012 and 2013. In 2014 the show was put back on the schedule, but held in June instead, filling the void left when Triplemanía was moved. AAA did not hold a Verano de Escándalo in 2016, instead holding the Lucha Libre World Cup in June. The 2019 Verano de Escándalo show will be the 20th show in the series.

=== Storylines ===
The Verano de Escándalo show featured a number of professional wrestling matches with different wrestlers involved in pre-existing, scripted feuds, plots, and storylines. Wrestlers were portrayed as either heels (referred to as rudos in Mexico, those that portray the "bad guys") or faces (técnicos in Mexico, the "good guy" characters) as they followed a series of tension-building events, which culminated in a wrestling match or series of matches.

== Results ==
| No. | Results | Stipulations | Times |
|---|---|---|---|
| 1 | Keyra defeated Chik Tormenta and Lady Shani (c) | Three-way match for the AAA Reina de Reinas Championship | 8:30 |
| 2 | Faby Apache defeated El Hijo del Tirantes | Singles match | 9:07 |
| 3 | Los Guardianes de la Lucha (Australian Suicide and Sammy Guevara) defeated Las Fresas Salvajes (Mamba and Máximo) | Tag team match | 12:46 |
| 4 | Laredo Kid and Taya defeated Daga and Tessa Blanchard | Mixed tag team match | 14:34 |
| 5 | Aero Star, Pagano and Puma King defeated Chessman, Killer Kross and Monster Clown (with Scarlett Bordeaux) | Six-man tag team match | 10:33 |
| 6 | El Hijo del Vikingo, La Parka and Myzteziz Jr. defeated Los Mercenarios (La Hiedra, Rey Escorpión and Texano Jr.) | Six-man tag team match | 13:23 |
| 7 | Lucha Brothers (Fénix and Pentagón Jr.) defeated The Young Bucks (Matt Jackson and Nick Jackson) (c) | Tag team match for the AAA World Tag Team Championship | 11:54 |
| 8 | Psycho Clown and Rey Wagner defeated Blue Demon Jr. and Taurus | Tag team match | 17:23 |
(c) / – the champion(s) heading into the match

== See also ==
- 2019 in professional wrestling
