= Triplemanía XXVI =

2018 Lucha Libre AAA World Wide event

- Poster featuring various AAA wrestlers
- Promotion: Lucha Libre AAA Worldwide
- Date: August 25, 2018
- City: Mexico City, Mexico
- Venue: Arena Ciudad de México
- Attendance: 13,500

Pay-per-view chronology
← Previous; AAA vs. Elite	Next → Héroes Inmortales XII

Triplemanía chronology
← Previous; XXV	Next → XXVII

Triplemanía XXVI was a professional wrestling event produced by the Mexican professional wrestling promotion Lucha Libre AAA Worldwide (AAA). It took place on August 25, 2018, in the Arena Ciudad de México in Mexico City, Mexico. This was the seventh consecutive Triplemanía to be held at the arena, and marks the 26th year in a row that AAA had held a Triplemanía show, and the 32nd show held under the Triplemanía banner since 1993. The annual Triplemanía show is AAA's biggest show of the year, serving as the culmination of major storylines and feature wrestlers from all over the world competing in what has been described as AAA's version of WrestleMania or their Super Bowl event.

The announced feature match of the show was billed as Póker de Ases or "Poker Aces", a four-way match held under Lucha de Apuestas, or "bet match", rules where one of the competitors was forced to unmask as a result of the loss.

Via AAA's partnership with the American Impact Wrestling and Major League Wrestling promotions, wrestlers from both companies appeared on the show, including Andrew Everett, DJZ, Brian Cage, A. C. H., Shane Strickland and Rich Swann.

== Production ==
=== Background ===
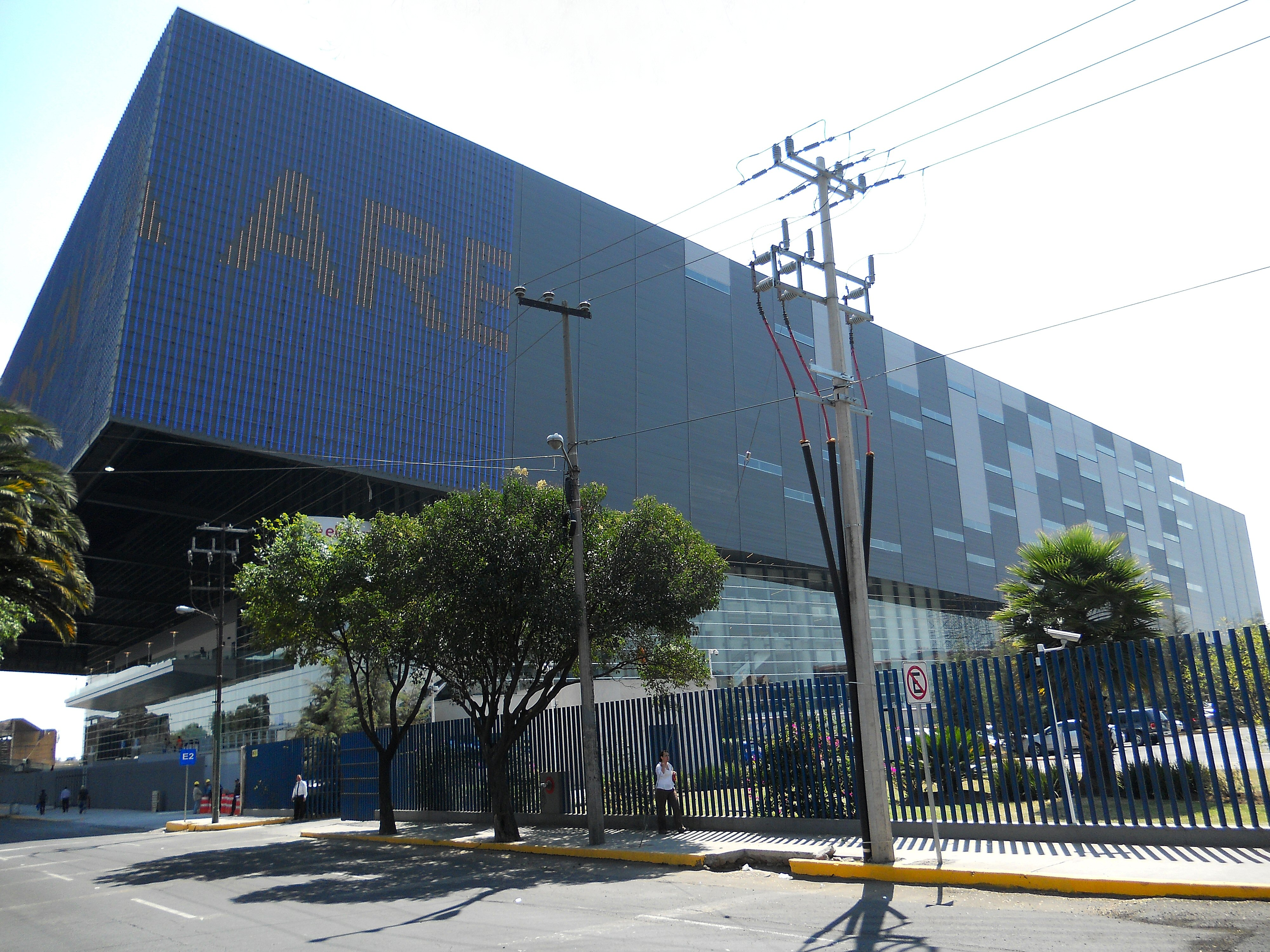
Outdoor view of the Arena Ciudad de México building.

2018 marked the 26th year since 1993 that the Mexican professional wrestling company Lucha Libre AAA Worldwide (AAA) or Triple A held their annual Triplemanía show and the 31st Triplemanía show promoted by AAA, as they held multiple Triplemanía shows over the summers of 1994 to 1997. The 2018 event took place on August 25, 2018, at the Arena Ciudad de México (Mexico City Arena), an indoor arena in Azcapotzalco, Mexico City, Mexico that has a maximum capacity of 22,300 spectators. This was the seventh consecutive Triplemanía (XX, XXI, XXII, XXIII, XXIV and XXV) held at the venue. AAA's Triplemanía is their biggest show of the year, AAA's equivalent of the WWE's WrestleMania or New Japan Pro-Wrestling's Wrestle Kingdom event.

=== Storylines ===
The Triplemanía XXVI show will feature an undetermined number of professional wrestling matches, with different wrestlers involved in pre-existing scripted feuds, plots and storylines. Wrestlers portray either heels (referred to as rudos in Mexico, those that portray the "bad guys") or faces (técnicos in Mexico, the "good guy" characters) as they follow a series of tension-building events, which culminate in wrestling matches.

On February 2, AAA director Dorian Roldan and AAA's talent director Vampiro announced a meeting entitled Poker of Aces. This encounter will be one of Fatal 4-Way bets in a Steel Cage Match, where until now the only confirmed are Psycho Clown and the AAA Latin American Champion El Hijo del Fantasma. On May 18, Fantasma and Clown won to Kevin Kross and Hernandez, after the fight, Juventud Guerrera appeared of surprise and pushed Psycho, which collided with Ghost and led to both attacking each other. On June 5 at a press conference, he revealed two other fighters for Poker Aces and turned out to be L.A. Park and Pentagón Jr. who make their return to the AAA.

On October 1, Lady Shani won the AAA Reina de Reinas Championship against Ayako Hamada in Héroes Inmortales XI (in which she vacated Sexy Star) a month ago. In November, Faby Apache became the challenger for the AAA Reina de Reinas Championship. On December 16, Apache and Shani fought for the title in which they ended up with no result, which retains Shani, after the fight, Apache attacks Shani mutually. On January 26 at Guerra de Titanes, Apache defeated Shani to win her third title, starting her fiefdom. On February 2 at the dam conference, a rematch between Apache and Shani was announced but it would be a mask fight against hair. On March 4 at Rey de Reyes, Apache defeats Shani in a non-title fight, with the help of Estrella Divina.

On March 6 at a press conference, the fifth edition of the Copa Triplemanía was announced, but it was later canceled. It was also announced that Alberto el Patrón would have a match at the event against a mystery opponent. However, on August 21, 2018, it was announced Alberto will not appear at the event. El Patrón explained he wouldn't appear since he had a discussion with Dorian Roldán over the money and the terms of his contract.

On June 3 at Verano de Escándalo, Jeff Jarrett made his return to the company joining as a member of MAD adding in the fight between Rey Wagner and Rey Mysterio Jr. for the AAA Mega Championship in which he emerged victorious winning the title for the second time and after the fight, Fenix saves the talent director of AAA Vampiro and the others and then face Konnan. On August 2, Fenix defeated Flamita and Bandido to be the number one contender and face Jarrett for the title in Triplemanía XXVI.

== AAA Hall of Fame ==
First established in 2007 the AAA Hall of Fame has inducted one or two lucha libre-related people each year at Triplemanía. The initial class of the Hall of Fame included AAA founder Antonio Peña and Rey Misterio Jr. Later inductees have included Eddie Guerrero (2008), Pepe "Tropi" Casas (2009), Octagón (2011), Perro Aguayo (2012), Abismo Negro (2013), El Brazo (2014), Rayo de Jalisco Sr. (2014), Héctor Garza (2015), El Hijo del Perro Aguayo (2015), Art Barr (2016), and Joaquin Roldan (2016).

== Results ==
No.	Results	Stipulations
1^{P}	Freelance, Astrolux and Dragon Bane defeated Draztick Boy, Aramis and Látigo	Six-man tag team match, Llave a la Gloria finals
2^{P}	Sammy Guevara defeated Australian Suicide (c), A. C. H. and Shane Strickland	Four-way match for the AAA World Cruiserweight Championship
3	Niño Hamburguesa and Big Mami (c) defeated Dinastía and Lady Maravilla, El Hijo del Vikingo and Vanilla, and Angelikal and La Hiedra	Four-way tag team match for the AAA World Mixed Tag Team Championship
4	MexaBlood (Bandido and Flamita) defeated Team AAA (Aero Star and Drago), Team ELITE (Laredo Kid and Golden Magic), Team Impact! (DJZ and Andrew Everett)	Four-way Ladder Match to determine the #1 Contenders to the AAA World Tag Team Championship
5	El Nuevo Poder del Norte (Carta Brava Jr., Mocho Cota Jr., and Tito Santana) defeated Team ELITE (El Hijo de L.A. Park, Puma King, and Taurus) and Team AAA (Mamba, Máximo, and Pimpinela Escarlata)	Lucha de Tercias
6	Los OGT's (Averno, Chessman, and Super Fly) defeated MAD (Juventud Guerrera, Jack Evans, and Teddy Hart)	Six-man tag team Lumberjack match
7	Los Mercenarios (El Texano Jr., Rey Escorpión, and La Máscara) defeated Joe Líder, Murder Clown, and Pagano	Six-man tag team street fight
8	Lady Shani (mask) defeated Faby Apache (hair)	Lucha de Apuestas, hair vs. mask match
9	Fénix defeated Jeff Jarrett (c), Brian Cage and Rich Swann	Four-way match for the AAA Mega Championship
10	L.A. Park defeated El Hijo del Fantasma; Pentagón Jr. and Psycho Clown were also involved in the match.	Póker de Ases, Lucha de Apuestas, mask vs. mask cage match
(c) / – the champion(s) heading into the match; P / – the match was broadcast on the pre-show

== See also ==
- 2018 in professional wrestling
