= Verano de Escándalo (2018) =

2018 Lucha Libre AAA World Wide event

- Official poser for the 2018 Verano de Escándalo show
- Promotion: Lucha Libre AAA Worldwide
- Date: June 3, 2018
- City: Monterrey, Nuevo León, Mexico
- Venue: Plaza de Toros La Monumental

Event chronology
← Previous; Rey de Reyes	Next → AAA vs. Elite

Verano de Escándalo chronology
← Previous; 2017	Next → 2019

Verano de Escándalo (2018) (Spanish for "Summer of Scandal") was a major professional wrestling event produced by the Mexican Lucha Libre AAA Worldwide (AAA) promotion, which took place on June 3, 2018, in Plaza de Toros La Monumental in Monterrey, Nuevo León, Mexico. The Verano de Escándalo event has been a regular summer event for AAA since 1997, only skipping the event in 2012, 2013 and 2016. 2018 marked the 19th time AAA has used that name for an event.

In the main event, Jeff Jarrett who defeated Rey Wagner and Rey Mysterio Jr., becoming the AAA Mega Champion for the second time. In addition, Los OGTs (Averno, Chessman and Super Fly) defeated El Nuevo Poder del Norte (Carta Brava Jr., Mocho Cota Jr. and Tito Santana) by winning their hair. The event was also notable for the surprise debuts of Sammy Guevara and Darby Allin were highlighted, the surprises of the evening was the returns of Lady Maravilla, Keira, Xtreme Tiger, Laredo Kid, Brian Cage, Jeff Jarrett, Konnan and Fénix in AAA.

== Production ==
=== Background ===
In September 1997 Mexican professional wrestling, company Asistencia Asesoría y Administración, later known as "AAA", or Triple A and then Lucha Libre AAA Worldwide added a new major event to their schedule as they held the first ever Verano de Escándalo ("Summer of Scandal") show on September 14, 1997. The Verano de Escándalo show became an annual event from 1997 until 2011, usually held in September, with few exceptions. In 2012 AAA changed their major event schedule as they pushed Triplemanía XX to August instead of holding the show in June or July as had been the case up until 2012. With the change to the schedule AAA did not hold a Verano de Escándalo show in 2012 and 2013. In 2014 the show was put back on the schedule, but held in June instead, filling the void left when Triplemanía was moved. AAA did not hold a Verano de Escándalo in 2016, instead holding the Lucha Libre World Cup in June. The 2018 Verano de Escándalo show will be the 19th show in the series.

=== Storylines ===
The Verano de Escándalo show featured a number of professional wrestling matches with different wrestlers involved in pre-existing, scripted feuds, plots, and storylines. Wrestlers were portrayed as either heels (referred to as rudos in Mexico, those that portray the "bad guys") or faces (técnicos in Mexico, the "good guy" characters) as they followed a series of tension-building events, which culminated in a wrestling match or series of matches.

== Results ==
No.	Results	Stipulations
1	El Hijo del Vikingo, Star Fire, Arkángel Divino and Dinastía defeated Arez, Belial, Ultimo Maldito and Lady Maravilla	Relevos Atómicos de Locura match
2	Lady Shani, Mamba and Pimpinela Escarlata defeated La Hiedra, Black Danger and Keyra	Tag team match
3	MAD (Juventud Guerrera & Kevin Kross) and El Texano Jr. defeated Pagano, Máximo and La Máscara	Tag team match
4	Aero Star defeated Drago, Sammy Guevara, Australian Suicide, Darby Allin and Golden Magic	6-Way Match
5	El Hijo del Fantasma, Rey Escorpión and Brian Cage defeated Xtreme Tiger, Laredo Kid and Psycho Clown	Tag team match
6	Los OGTs (Averno, Chessman and Super Fly) defeated El Nuevo Poder del Norte (Carta Brava Jr., Mocho Cota Jr. and Tito Santana)	Tag team Lucha de Apuestas match
7	Jeff Jarrett defeated Rey Wagner (c) and Rey Mysterio Jr.	Three-way match for the AAA Mega Championship
(c) / – the champion(s) heading into the match

== See also ==
- 2018 in professional wrestling
