= Lucha Capital =

Lucha Libre AAA Worldwide professional wrestling Facebook Watch program

- Genre: Sports entertainment; Professional wrestling
- Starring: AAA roster
- Country of origin: Mexico
- No. of seasons: 2
- No. of episodes: 16

Production
- Camera setup: Multi-camera
- Running time: 90-120 minutes
- Production company: Lucha Libre AAA Worldwide

Original release
- Network: Facebook Watch
- Release: October 31, 2018 – 2019

Lucha Capital (Spanish for "Capital Fight") is a Mexican seasonal professional wrestling streaming television series and tournament produced by Lucha Libre AAA Worldwide (AAA). Like all professional wrestling events, it is based on scripted storylines and its outcomes are predetermined. The show premiered on October 31, 2018, on Facebook Watch.

On October 9, 2019, AAA announced Season 2 of the Lucha Capital.

== Bracket ==
=== Men's ===
N°	Wrestler	Points	Eliminated by
1	Australian Suicide	6	Pentagón
2	El Hijo del Vikingo	6	Kid
3	Golden Magic	6	Pentagón
4	Laredo Kid	6	Winner
5	Máximo	6	Magic
6	Pagano	6	Psycho
7	Pentagón Jr.	6	Kross
8	Psycho Clown	6	Kross
9	Aero Star	3	Magic
10	Drago	3	Vikingo
11	El Texano Jr.	3	Kid
12	Fénix	3	By abandoned
13	Killer Kross	3	N/A
14	Mascarita Sagrada	3	Máximo
15	Murder Clown	3	Psycho
16	Taurus	0	Pagano
17	Niño Hamburguesa	0	Magic
18	Puma King	0	Drago

=== Women's ===
N°	Wrestler	Points	Eliminated by
1	Taya Valkyrie	6	Winner
2	Lady Shani	6	By abandoned
3	Keira	3	Valkyrie
4	Vanilla	3	Valkyrie
5	Scarlett Bordeaux	0	N/A
6	La Hiedra	0	Valkyrie
7	Lady Maravilla	0	Shani
