= Triplemanía XXVII =

2019 Lucha Libre AAA Worldwide event

- Promotional poster featuring various AAA wrestlers
- Promotion: Lucha Libre AAA Worldwide
- Date: August 3, 2019
- City: Mexico City, Mexico
- Venue: Arena Ciudad de México
- Attendance: 17,000

Pay-per-view chronology
| ← Previous; Verano de Escándalo | Next → Lucha Invades NY |

Triplemanía chronology
| ← Previous; XXVI | Next → Regia |

Triplemanía XXVII was a professional wrestling event produced and scripted by the Mexican professional wrestling promotion Lucha Libre AAA Worldwide (AAA). The event took place on August 3, 2019, at the Arena Ciudad de México in Mexico City, Mexico. It was the eighth consecutive Triplemanía to be held at the arena, and marked the 27th year in a row that AAA had held a Triplemanía show, and the 32nd overall show held under the Triplemanía banner since 1993. The annual Triplemanía show is AAA's biggest event of the year, serving as the culmination of major storylines in what has been described as AAA's version of WrestleMania or their Super Bowl. The show was broadcast live on Azteca 7 and Space along with simulcasting worldwide on Twitch.

In the main event match, Blue Demon Jr. successfully defended his mask and won the hair of Dr. Wagner Jr. in a Lucha de Apuestas; after the match Wagner announced his retirement from professional wrestling. Other featured matches saw former UFC Heavyweight Champion Cain Velasquez make his professional wrestling debut and new AAA World Mixed Tag Team, AAA World Trios and Reina de Reinas champions crowned. Wrestlers from the American promotions All Elite Wrestling (AEW) and Impact Wrestling - with which AAA has partnerships - also appeared on the card.

== Production ==
=== Background ===
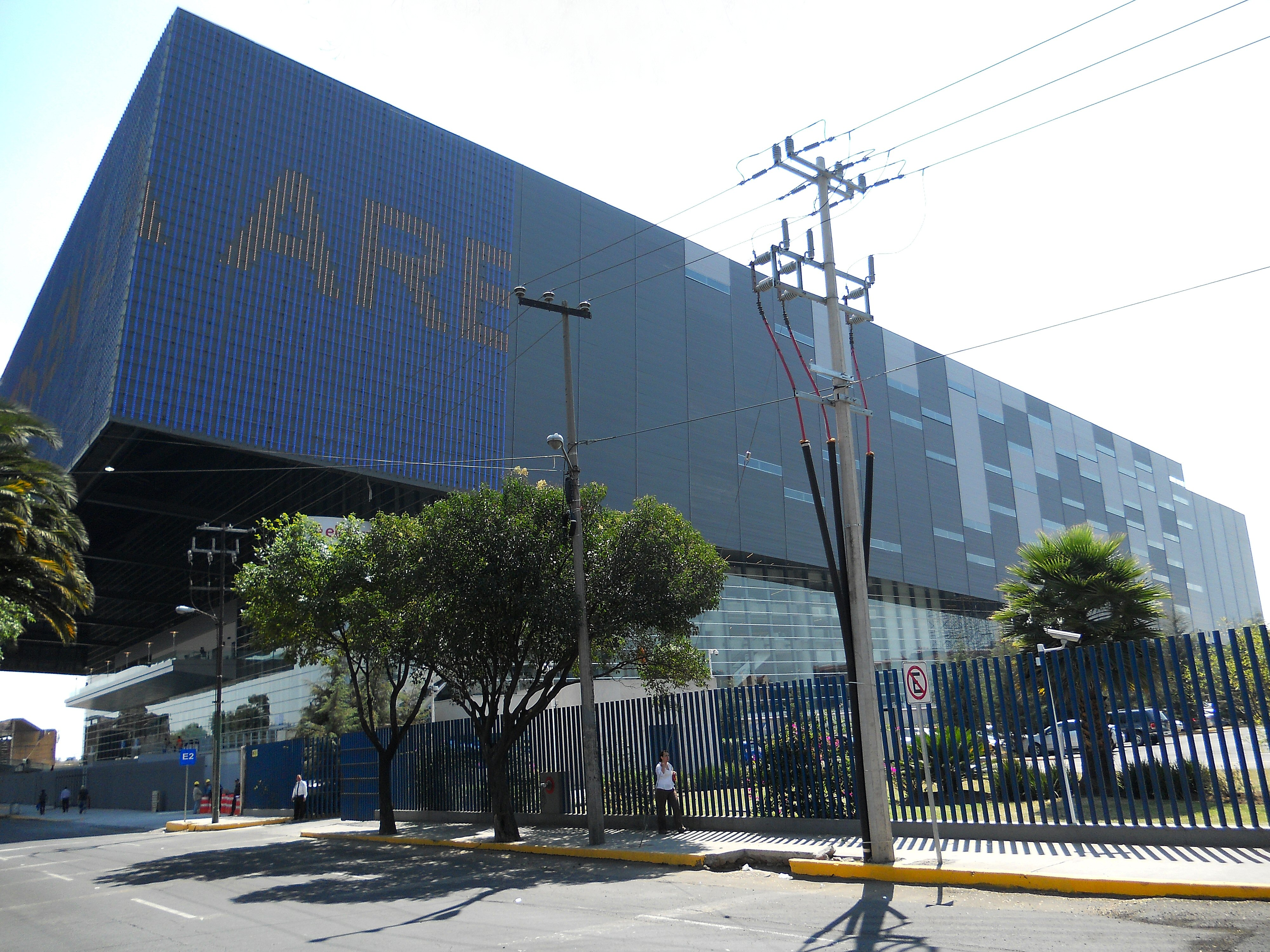
Outdoor view of the Arena Ciudad de México building.

2019 marked the 27th year that the Mexican professional wrestling company Lucha Libre AAA Worldwide (Triple A or AAA) has held their annual flagship Triplemanía show and the 31st overall Triplemanía show promoted by AAA (AAA promoted multiple Triplemanía shows over the summers of 1994 to 1997). Since the 2012 event, Triplemanía has taken place at the Arena Ciudad de México (Mexico City Arena), an indoor arena in Azcapotzalco, Mexico City, Mexico that has a maximum capacity of 22,300 spectators. Triplemanía XXVII is the eighth consecutive Triplemanía (XX, XXI, XXII, XXIII, XXIV, XXV and XXVI) held at the venue. AAA's Triplemanía is their biggest show of the year, AAA's equivalent of WWE's WrestleMania or New Japan Pro-Wrestling's Wrestle Kingdom event.

=== Storylines ===
Triplemanía XXVII featured eight professional wrestling matches, with different wrestlers involved in pre-existing scripted feuds, plots and storylines. Wrestlers portray either heels (referred to as rudos in Mexico, those that portray the "bad guys") or faces (técnicos in Mexico, the "good guy" characters) as they follow a series of tension-building events, which culminate in wrestling matches.

On August 25, 2018 at Triplemanía XXVI, L.A. Park won the Póker de Ases four-way steel cage match, forcing El Hijo del Fantasma to unmask. After the match, Rey Wagner came to the ring and challenged L.A. Park to bet his mask at Triplemanía XXVII, a challenge that was accepted by L.A. Park. However, in October 2018, L.A. Park left AAA, citing his unhappiness with how the company was treating him. On October 26 at Héroes Inmortales XII, Blue Demon Jr. betrayed Rey Wagner during Wagner's match against Jeff Jarrett, which Wagner still won. In December, Blue Demon Jr. continued to cement his role as Rey Wagner's rival. On February 10, Wagner emerged victorious against Blue Demon Jr. in a Street Fight and that same night, challenged Demon to a Lucha de Apuestas, a challenge that was not answered at the time. On February 27, AAA announced that Blue Demon Jr. and Rey Wagner will face off in a Luchas de Apuestas as the main event of Triplemanía XXVII.

In February 2019, former UFC heavyweight champion Cain Velasquez made statements branding Lucha Libre as "fake" and "a show without real blows." On March 26, at an AAA press conference, Velasquez announced that he had signed with the company and was then confronted by a group on AAA wrestlers, including Texano Jr. On July 2, AAA announced that a trios match pitting Velasquez, Psycho Clown, and Cody Rhodes against Los Mercenarios (Texano Jr. and Taurus) and a surprise partner was signed for Triplemanía XXVI.

In early February 2019, The Lucha Bros. (Fénix and Pentagón Jr.) appeared at the AEW rally in Las Vegas where they confronted and attacked the company's executive vice presidents The Young Bucks (Matt Jackson and Nick Jackson). On February 23, at AAW Wrestling's The Art of War event, the Jacksons attacked Fénix and Pentagón. On March 16 at Rey de Reyes, The Young Bucks defeated The Lucha Bros. to win the AAA World Tag Team Championship and on May 25, at Double or Nothing, successfully defended their titles in a rematch. On June 16 at Verano de Escándalo, The Lucha Bros. regained their titles in a rubber match. On June 29 at Fyter Fest, Laredo Kid teamed with The Lucha Bros. unsuccessfully against The Young Bucks and Kenny Omega. On July 2, AAA announced that a rematch of the Fyter Fest trios match was signed for Triplemanía XXVII.

On June 16 at Verano de Escándalo, Keyra won the AAA Reina de Reinas Championship after defeating champion Lady Shani and Chik Tormenta in a three-way match. On July 2, AAA announced the first women's Tables, Ladders, and Chairs match in the company's history which will see Keyra defend her title against Lady Shani, Chik Tormenta, Faby Apache, La Hiedra, and Impact Wrestling representatives Taya and Tessa Blanchard at Triplemanía XXVII.

== Aftermath ==
The next day after Triplemanía XXVII, Wagner declared that it was not his last match as a wrestler and should fulfill his commitments already agreed before his final retirement in 2020.

== Results ==
| No. | Results | Stipulations | Times |
|---|---|---|---|
| 1^{P} | Astrolux, Dragon Bane, and Arkángel Divino defeated Aramis, Toxin, and Arez | Llave a la Gloria match | 10:53 |
| 2 | Villano III Jr. and Lady Maravilla defeated Niño Hamburguesa and Big Mami (c), Sammy Guevara and Scarlett Bordeaux, and Australian Suicide and Vanilla | Four-way tag team match for the AAA World Mixed Tag Team Championship | 12:38 |
| 3 | Los Jinetes del Aire (El Hijo del Vikingo, Myzteziz Jr., and Golden Magic) defeated El Nuevo Poder del Norte (Mocho Cota Jr., Carta Brava Jr., and Tito Santana) and Las Fresas Salvajes (Pimpinela Escarlata, Mamba, and Máximo) | Three-way Trios match for the vacant AAA World Trios Championship | 14:38 |
| 4 | Pagano defeated Chessman, Eclipse Jr., La Parka, Puma King, Aero Star, Drago, Averno, Super Fly, Monster Clown, Murder Clown, Daga, Konnan, Vampiro, and Rey Escorpión | Fifteen-man Copa Triplemanía match | 26:45 |
| 5 | Tessa Blanchard defeated Lady Shani, Taya, Faby Apache, Chik Tormenta, La Hiedra, and Ayako Hamada | Seven-woman Tables, Ladders, and Chairs match for the vacant AAA Reina de Reinas Championship | 10:32 |
| 6 | Psycho Clown, Cody Rhodes, and Cain Velasquez defeated Los Mercenarios (Texano Jr. and Taurus) and Killer Kross | Trios match | 13:08 |
| 7 | Laredo Kid and The Lucha Bros (Pentagón Jr. and Fénix) defeated The Elite (Kenny Omega and The Young Bucks (Matt Jackson and Nick Jackson)) | Trios match | 18:47 |
| 8 | Blue Demon Jr. (mask) defeated Dr. Wagner Jr. (hair) | Lucha de Apuestas, mask vs. hair match | 14:47 |
(c) / – the champion(s) heading into the match; P / – the match was broadcast on the pre-show

== See also ==
- 2019 in professional wrestling
