= Héroes Inmortales X =

2016 Lucha Libre AAA World Wide event

- AAA's official poster for the show
- Promotion: Lucha Libre AAA World Wide
- Date: October 2, 2016
- City: Monterrey, Nuevo León, Mexico
- Venue: Arena Monterrey

Event chronology
← Previous; Triplemanía XXIV	Next → Guerra de Titanes

Héroes Inmortales chronology
← Previous; IX	Next → XI

Héroes Inmortales X (Spanish for "Immortal Heroes Ten") was a professional wrestling event produced and scripted by the Mexican professional wrestling promotion Lucha Libre AAA World Wide (AAA). The event took place on October 2, 2016 at Arena Monterrey in Monterrey, Nuevo León, Mexico. It was the tenth annual AAA show held in honor of deceased founder Antonio Peña and featured the Copa Antonio Peña tournament named in his honor won by Pimpinela Escarlata.

The main event was scheduled to be a tag team match with the team of Psycho Clown and El Patrón Alberto facing off against Dr. Wagner Jr. and Pagano, but El Patrón Alberto did not show for the match after he was legitimately stabbed outside a restaurant in San Antonio, Texas. That match was moved down to the fifth match of the night and made a three-way match between the remaining competitors. During the match Psycho Clown's long time tag team partners, Murder Clown and Monster Clown, turned rudo on him to allow Dr. Wagner Jr. to win the match. Dr. Wagner Jr. then proceeded to unmask Psycho Clown in the middle of the ring. After the reshuffled card Johnny Mundo defend the AAA Latin American Championship against Garza Jr. in the main event. In the sixth match of the night Daga defeated Australian Suicide in a Lucha de Apuestas, or bet match, forcing Australian Suicide to unmask.

== Production ==
=== Background ===
In 1992 then-Consejo Mundial de Lucha Libre (CMLL) booker and match maker Antonio Peña left the company alongside a number of wrestlers to form the Mexican professional wrestling, company Asistencia Asesoría y Administración, later known simply as "AAA". Over the next decade-and-a-half Peña and the team behind AAA built the promotion into one of the biggest wrestling companies in the world. On October 5, 2006, Peña died from a heart attack. After Peña's death his brother-in-law Jorge Roldan took control of the company with both his wife Marisela Peña, Antonio's sister, and Dorian Roldan (their son) also taking an active part in AAA. On October 7, 2007,AAA held a show in honor of Peña's memory, the first ever "Antonio Peña Memorial Show" (Homenaje a Antonio Peña in Spanish). The following year AAA held the second ever "Antonio Peña Memorial Show", making it an annual tradition for the company to commemorate the passing of their founder. In 2008 the show was rebranded as Héroes Inmortales (Spanish for "Immortal Heroes"), retroactively rebranding the 2007 and 2008 event as Héroes Inmortales I and Héroes Inmortales II.

AAA has held a Héroes Inmortales every year since then, with the 2016 version of the show being Héroes Inmortales X (10). The Héroes Inmortales hosts the Copa Antonio Peña ("Antonio Peña Cup") tournament each year, a multi-man tournament with various wrestlers from AAA or other promotions competing for a trophy. The tournament format has usually been either a gauntlet match or a multi-man torneo cibernetico elimination match. Outside of the actual Copa Antonio Peña trophy the winner is not guaranteed any other "prizes" as a result of winning the tournament.

=== Storylines ===
The Héroes Inmortales X show featured seven professional wrestling matches with different wrestlers involved in pre-existing scripted feuds, plots and storylines. Wrestlers portrayed either heels (referred to as rudos in Mexico, those that portray the "bad guys") or faces (técnicos in Mexico, the "good guy" characters) as they followed a series of tension-building events, which culminated in a wrestling match or series of matches.

In the early part of 2016 Pagano started a storyline feud with Psycho Clown, an AAA wrestler who, like Pagano, used a clown ring character. In Pagano's first match with AAA he, Damián 666 and Nicho defeated Los Psycho Circus (Psycho Clown, Murder Clown and Monster Clown) by count-out. Subsequently, Pagano and Psycho Clown faced off in a Hardcore wrestling match. During the match Pagano lit a wooden table on fire and then threw Psycho Clown through it to win the match. Two weeks later the two clashed again, this time in a match that also included Pentagón Jr., a match that was once again won by Pagano. After defeating Psycho Clown once more on July 8 and stealing Psycho Clown's wrestling mask, Pagano challenged Psycho Clown to put his mask on the line while Pagano would put up his hair in a Luchas de Apuestas, or "bet match". At the time Psycho Clown did not respond to the challenge. At Triplemanía XXIV Psycho Clown defeated Pagano, forcing Pagano to have all his hair shaved off. During the closing moments of the match Dr. Wagner Jr. came to the ring and after the match was over he challenged Psycho Clown to put his mask on the line at Triplemanía XXV the following year.

El Patrón Alberto defeated El Texano Jr. to win the AAA Mega Championship at the 2014 Guerra de Titanes show. Over the next year El Patrón defended the championship on several occasions, until he signed a contract with WWE in late 2015, which led to AAA announcing that since the WWE would not allow El Patrón to defend the championship it was vacated and they would hold a tournament to determine a new champion. In September 2016 El Patrón Alberto left WWE, followed by AAA announcing that El Patrón would work the main event of Héroes Inmortales X, teaming with Psycho Clown to take on Pagano and Dr. Wagner Jr.

Long time rivals Daga and Australian Suicide first started to cross paths in early 2014, with their first high-profile match taking place at that year's Rey de Reyes ("King of Kings") show. At Rey de Reyes Daga successfully defended the AAA World Cruiserweight Championship against Australian Suicide, Argenis and Super Fly. In subsequent months the two found themselves on opposite sides of various trios matches as their rivalry intensified. At Triplemanía XXII Daga put his championship on the line in a multi-man match that also included Australian Suicide and several other wrestlers. During the match Daga eliminated Australian Suicide, but in the end El Hijo del Fantasma pinned Angélico to win the championship. Over the following months Daga and Australian Suicide would interfere in each other's matches as a measure of revenge. During one run in Australian Suicide threw a steel chair at Daga's face with so much force that it gave Daga a black eye and lacerations to the face.

The team of Averno and Chessman, also known as Los Hell Brothers won the vacant AAA World Tag Team Championship by defeating the teams of Aero Star/Fénix and Máscara Año 2000 Jr./Villano IV at the Guerra de Titanes show. Los Hell Brothers subsequently made several successful title defenses and began bragging about how there were no challengers left for them to deal with, that "no man" could defeat them. In the spring of 2016 sisters-turned-rivals Mari Apache and Faby Apache reunited as Mari returned to the tecnico side and started to team up with her sister on a regular basis. The two teamed up with their former step-mother Lady Apache and won the women's version of the 2016 Lucha Libre World Cup. Around the time of the World Cup Mari and Faby Apache challenged Los Hell Brothers, demanding that they put the tag team championship on the line, a challenge that Averno and Chessman turned down, acting very dismissing and sexist in the process. During the July 8 AAA Television taping Averno and Chessman dressed up as a pair of frumpy women as they mocked Los Apaches. At the subsequent taping Los Apaches distracted Averno and Chessman during a title defense against Jack Evans and Angélico, which led to Averno and Chessman losing the tag team title. Afterwards it was announced that Averno and Chessman had finally agreed to face Los Apaches at Triplemanía XXIV.

== Results ==
No.	Results	Stipulations
1	Aero Star and Drago (c) defeated Laredo Kid and Super Fly, La Familia Fronteriza (Damián 666 and Nicho El Millonario) and Los Psycho Circus (Monster Clown and Murder Clown)	Four-way tag team Ladder match for the AAA World Tag Team Championship
2	Pimpinela Escarlata defeated El Zorro, El Elegido, Nino Hamburgesa, Bengala, Lady Shani, Dark Scoria, Dark Cuervo, Octagoncito, Big Mami, El Hijo de Pirata Morgan and Pirata Morgan	12-man Copa Antonio Peña battle royal
3	Los O.G.T's (Averno, Chessman and Ricky Marvin) defeated El Apache, Mary Apache and Faby Apache by disqualification	Six-man tag team match
4	El Mesías, Hernandez and Marty Casaus defeated El Hijo del Fantasma, La Parka and El Texano Jr.	Six-man tag team match
5	Dr. Wagner Jr. defeated Pagano and Psycho Clown	Triple threat match
6	Daga defeated Australian Suicide	Best two-out-of-three falls Lucha de Apuestas, mask vs. hair match
7	Johnny Mundo (c) defeated Garza Jr.	Singles match for the AAA Latin American Championship
(c) / – the champion(s) heading into the match

== See also ==
- 2016 in professional wrestling
