= Keyra =

Mexican professional wrestler (born 1995)

Personal information
- Born: October 26, 1995 (age 31) Mexico City, Mexico

Professional wrestling career
- Ring name(s): Keira; Keyra
- Billed height: 1.63 m (5 ft 4 in)
- Billed weight: 53 kg (117 lb)
- Trained by: Gran Apache; Robotman; Luis Cirio
- Debut: 2009

Keyra (born October 26, 1995) is a Mexican professional wrestler. She best known for Lucha Libre AAA Worldwide (AAA), where she is the former AAA Reina de Reinas Champion. She is primarily known for her work for Lucha Libre Elite, The Crash Lucha Libre, Impact Wrestling as well as on the Mexican and independent circuit. Her real name is not a matter of public record as is often the case with masked wrestlers in Mexico.

== Professional wrestling career ==
=== Independent circuit (2009–present) ===
On January 29, 2017, Keira defeat Silueta to win the CMLL-Reina International Junior Championship. However, she vacated her title for undisclosed reasons. On April 5, Keyra defeated Candy White, Lady Maravilla, Santana Garrett and Laurel Van Ness to win The Crash Women's Championship. On January 20, Keyra lost The Crash Women's Championship to Lacey Lane. On March 20, 2017, Keira won Diosa Quetzal's mask in a Lucha de Apuestas at Promociones Corsario Negro.

On January 1, 2019, Keira defeated Diosa Quetzal, Lady Flamer, Zeuxis and La Hija de Gatubela in Naucalpan, that same night announced that it would be her last appearance as an independent since she claimed that she would go to AAA full-time.

=== Lucha Libre AAA World Wide (2015, 2016) ===
On May 5, Keyra made her debut at AAA and teaming with Faby Apache in a tag team match, where they defeated Mary Apache and Taya Valkyrie. On January 22, Keyra made her second appearance in Guerra de Titanes where she replaced Sexy Star because of an injury, teaming with Lady Shani and Taya where they managed to defeat Faby Apache, Goya Kong and Maravilla.

=== Return to AAA (2018–2020) ===
After returning to appear in AAA for a long time, on June 4, Keyra returned to appear in Verano de Escándalo teaming with La Hiedra and Black Danger in a tag team match, where they defeated Lady Shani, Mamba and Pimpinela Escarlata. On July 21 in AAA vs. Elite teaming with Zeuxis as representative of Liga Elite they were defeated before the Team AAA (Faby Apache, La Hiedra and Vanilla). On September 7, Keyra teaming with La Hiedra and Scarlett Bordeaux in a tag team match, where defeated Lady Maravilla, Lady Shani and Vanilla Vargas. That same night, Keira asked a Director of Talent for AAA Vampiro to be the #1 contender for the AAA Reina de Reinas Championship.

On June 16, 2019, at Verano de Escándalo Keyra defeated Chik Tormenta and Lady Shani to win the AAA Reina de Reinas Championship, starting her first championship reign in AAA. However, in mid-July, Keyra suffered a left knee injury at an Promociones EMW event, so she left her vacant title in Triplemanía XXVII, ending her reign of 48 days. On August 3, Keyra was replaced by Ayako Hamada in her match. At Héroes Inmortales XIII on October 19, Keyra return to the ring teamed up with Látigo in a match for the AAA World Mixed Tag Team Championship against Niño Hamburguesa and Big Mami and Lady Maravilla and Villano III Jr., where they were unsuccessful. On December 4, Keyra defeated Big Mami and Lady Shani by winning the Women's Lucha Capital tournament 2019 and that same night she got an opportunity for the AAA Reina de Reinas Championship of Taya for a future match.

=== Impact Wrestling (2018–2019) ===
Due to AAA's alliance with American promotion Impact Wrestling, Keyra made a special appearance on the October 11, 2018 edition of Impact Wrestling, which was taped September 13–14, 2018 at Mexico City's Frontón México Entertainment Center, was defeated by the Impact Knockouts Champion Tessa Blanchard.

On January 25, 2019, in Impact!, Keyra made her second appearance where she was defeated by the Impact Knockouts Champion Taya Valkyrie, which was filmed in Mexico.

== Personal life ==
Keyra was in a relationship with fellow enmascarado luchador (professional wrestler) Carlos Ramírez Carmona, better known by the ring name Myzteziz Jr. until their contentious divorce in mid-2024.

On September 22, 2024, Keyra accused her ex-husband through social media of abducting her 2-year-old son without her consent, because Myzteziz Jr. had discharged the child from a hospital stay after a blood transfusion and took him home. Shortly after, the AMBER Alert was activated to help locate the child, which was widely shared by fans and fellow wrestlers. Keyra noted that her son was still in a delicate state of health and needed the care of his mother. In an act of desperation due to Myzteziz Jr. not disseminating his location, she also shared a photo of Myzteziz Jr.'s face in the hope that it would speed up the search. Myzteziz Jr.'s version of events was that the child was hospitalized for malnourishment due to neglect on Keyra's part, and that he was rescuing his son from further abuse. Myzteziz Jr. was ultimately granted custody of their son and an order of protection against Keyra.

== Championships and accomplishments ==
- AULL
  - AULL Women's Championship (1 time)
- Comision de Box y Lucha D.F.
  - Lucha Libre MX Women's Championship (1 time)
- Generación XXI
  - Generación XXI Women's Championship (1 time)
- Lucha Libre AAA Worldwide
  - AAA Reina de Reinas Championship (1 time)
  - Lucha Capital (2019 Women's)
- New Wrestling Generation
  - NWG Divas Championship (1 time)
- Promociones EMW
  - EMW Women's Championship (1 time)
- The Crash
  - The Crash Women's Championship (2 time, current)
- Universal Woman's Pro Wrestling Reina
  - CMLL-Reina International Junior Championship (1 time)

== Luchas de Apuestas record ==
Winner (wager)	Loser (wager)	Location	Event	Date	Notes
Keyra (mask)	Diosa Quetzal (mask)	Ecatepec, State of Mexico	Promociones Corsario Negro	March 20, 2017	
