= The Crash V Aniversario =

Mexican professional wrestling show

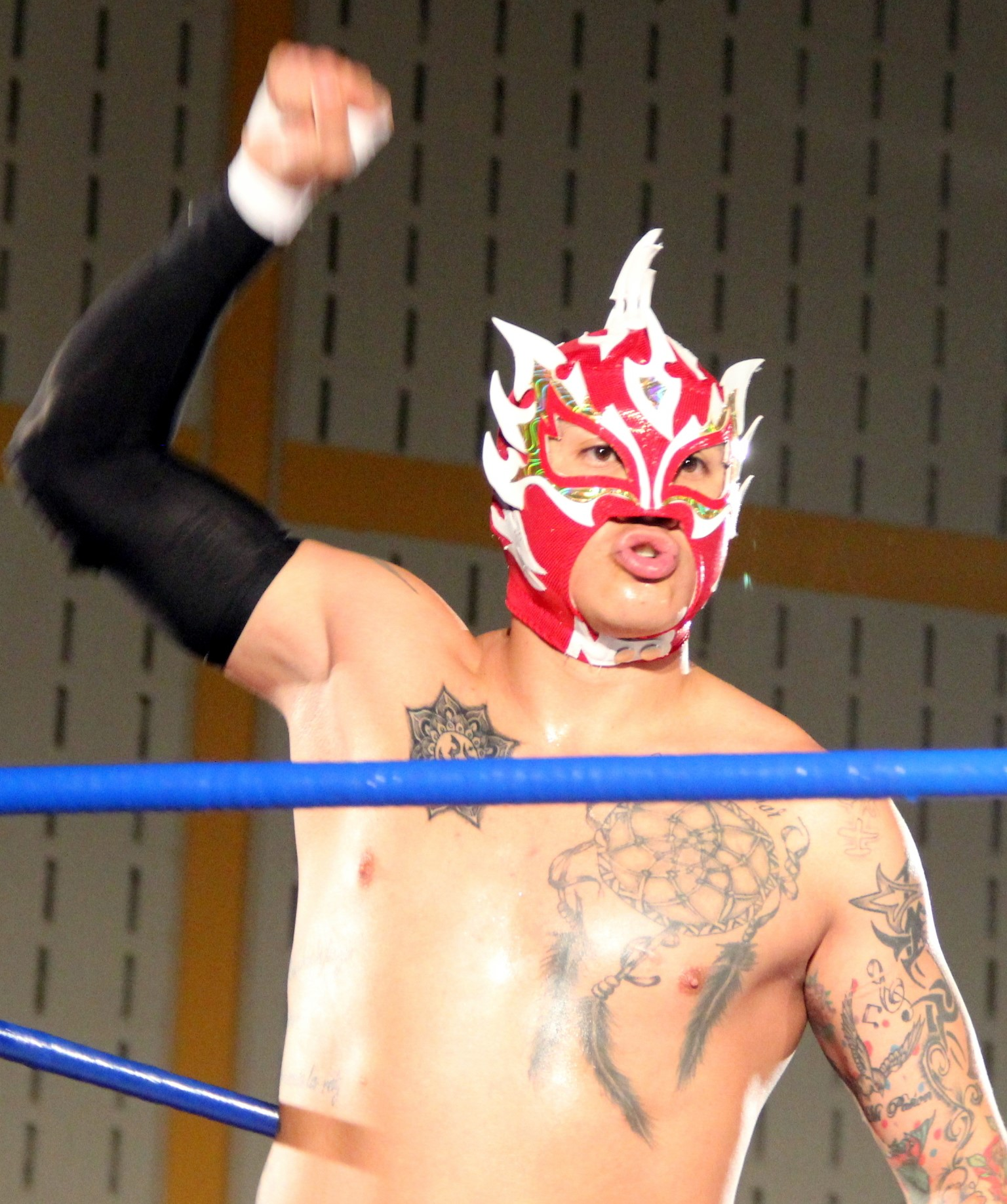
- Rey Fénix, teamed up with Jeff Hardy and Rey Mysterio Jr. to win the main event match.
- Promotion: The Crash Lucha Libre
- Date: November 26, 2016
- City: Tijuana, Baja California, Mexico
- Venue: Auditorio Fausto Gutierrez

The Crash Aniversario chronology
← Previous first	Next → VI

The Crash V Aniversario or The Crash Quinto Aniversario (Spanish for The Crash 5th Anniversary Show) was a professional wrestling supercard event, scripted and produced by the Mexican lucha libre wrestling company The Crash Lucha Libre, which took place on November 26, 2016, at Auditorio Fausto Gutierrez in The Crash's home town of Tijuana, Baja California. The event commemorated the creation of The Crash Lucha Libre in November 2011 and is their biggest show of the year.

The main event was a traditional lucha libre best-two-out-of-three falls six-man tag team match, the most common match type in Mexico, that saw independent circuit top workers Jeff Hardy, Rey Fénix, and Rey Mysterio Jr. facd and defeat Jeff Cobb, Nicho el Millonario, and Teddy Hart two falls to one. Flamita successfully defended The Crash Cruiserweight Championship against Extreme Tiger when the referee stopped the match after Extreme Tiger hurt his shoulder during the match. The show also introduced the brand-new The Crash Women's Championship, which Sexy Dulce won by Keira in a Singles match. The show featured three additional matches.

== Production ==
=== Background ===
The Crash Lucha Libre began operating on 2011, focusing mainly on promotion professional wrestling event in Tijuana, Baja California, Mexico. Their first show was held on November 4, 2011, with a main event of El Hijo del Santo and Latin Lover defeating El Hijo del Solitario and Marco Corleone. The Crash held shows on a limited schedule over the next couple of years; 4 in 2012, 4 in 2013, 2 in 2014, and 5 in 2015.

The Crash V Aniversario show on November 26, 2016, was the first time they billed one of their shows as a direct celebration of their anniversary. In subsequent years The Crash has held an Aniversario show each year, building them into their biggest show of the year.

== Event ==
The Crash V Aniversario show featured six professional wrestling matches scripted by The Crash with some wrestlers involved in scripted feuds. The wrestlers portray either heels (referred to as rudos in Mexico, those that play the part of the "bad guys") or faces (técnicos in Mexico, the "good guy" characters) as they perform in the ring.

== Aftermath ==
Flamita would remain The Crash Cruiserweight Champion until June 2, 2017, where he lost the title to Rey Horus, ending his reign after 293 days. After becoming the first The Crash Women's Champion, Sexy Dulce held the title for 290 until April 5, 2017, when she lost a match to Keira that also included Lacey Lane and Santana Garrett where she was not pinned.

== Results ==
No.	Results	Stipulations	Times
1	Black Danger, Douglas James, and Último Maldito defeated Arkángel Divino, Eli Everfly, and Mirage	Six-man tag team match	—
2	Black Boy, Oraculo, and Proximo defeated Aeroboy, Drastik Boy, and Jinzo	Six-man tag team match	—
3	Sexy Dulce defeated Keira	Singles match for the vacant The Crash Women's Championship	—
4	Jack Evans, Mascarita Dorada, and Willie Mack defeated Bestia 666, Black Tauro, and Demus 3:16	Six-man tag team match	—
5	Flamita (c) defeated Extreme Tiger by referee's decision	Singles match for The Crash Cruiserweight Championship	—
6	Jeff Hardy, Rey Fénix, and Rey Mysterio Jr. defeated Jeff Cobb, Nicho el Millonario, and Teddy Hart	Six-man tag team match	23:14
(c) / – the champion(s) heading into the match
