= The Crash Women's Championship =

Mexican professional wrestling championship

- The Crash Women's Championship belt

Details
- Promotion: The Crash Lucha Libre
- Date established: November 26, 2016
- Current champion: Keyra
- Date won: March 3, 2024
Statistics
- First champion: Sexy Dulce
- Longest reign: Lady Flamer (1,084 days)
- Shortest reign: Sexy Dulce (130 days)
- Oldest champion: Sexy Dulce (33 years, 130 days)
- Youngest champion: Keira (21 years, 290 days)
- Heaviest champion: Lady Flamer (60 kg (130 lb))
- Lightest champion: Keira (53 kg (117 lb))

The Crash Women's Championship (Campeonato Femenino de The Crash in Spanish) in professional wrestling is the promotion's female-based title. Dulce Tormenta is the current champion in her first reign. She defeated Jessie Jackson for the vacant title at the Crash on May 5, 2023.

As a professional championship, it was not won by actual competition, but by a scripted ending to a match determined by the bookers and match makers. (Note: Hornbaker (2016) p. 550: "Professional wrestling is a sport in which match finishes are predetermined. Thus, win–loss records are not indicative of a wrestler's genuine success based on their legitimate abilities – but on now much, or how little they were pushed by promoters") The promotion periodically declares a championship vacant, due either to a storyline (Note: Duncan & Will (2000) p. 271, Chapter: Texas: NWA American Tag Team Title [World Class, Adkisson] "Championship held up and rematch ordered because of the interference of manager Gary Hart") or to a real-life issue (injury, retirement, departure from the company) that makes the champion unable to defend the title. (Note: Duncan & Will (2000) p. 20, Chapter: (United States: 19th Century & widely defended titles – NWA, WWF, AWA, IW, ECW, NWA) NWA/WCW TV Title "Rhodes stripped on 85/10/19 for not defending the belt after having his leg broken by Ric Flair and Ole & Arn Anderson") (Note: Duncan & Will (2000) p. 201, Chapter: (Memphis, Nashville) Memphis: USWA Tag Team Title "Vacant on 93/01/18 when Spike leaves the USWA.")

== Title history ==
As of January 2, 2026, there have been eight reigns between eight champions and two vacancies. Sexy Dulce was the inaugural champion. Dulce is also the older champion an 33 years old, while Keira is the youngest at 21 years old. Lady Flammer has the longest reign at 1,084 days, while Dulce's reign is the shortest at 130 days.

Keyra is the current champion in her second reign. She won the title by defeating the previous champion Julissa Mexa, Ayako Hamada, Jessica Roden and Tiffany in a five-way match in The Crash show in Tijuana, Baja California on March 3, 2024.

Key
No.	Overall reign number
Reign	Reign number for the specific champion
Days	Number of days held
+	Current reign is changing daily

No.	Champion	Championship change			Reign statistics		Notes	Ref.
No.	Champion	Date	Event	Location	Reign	Days	Notes	Ref.
1	Sexy Dulce	November 26, 2016	The Crash V Aniversario	Tijuana, Baja California	1	130	Defeated Keira to become the inaugural champion.	
2	Keira	April 5, 2017	The Crash	Mexico City	1	290	This was a seven-way match, also involving Candy White, Lady Maravilla, Santana Garrett and Laurel Van Ness.	
3	Lacey Lane	January 20, 2018	The Crash	Tijuana, Baja California	1	175		
4	Tessa Blanchard	July 14, 2018	The Crash	Tijuana, Baja California	1	210	This was a three-way match, also involving Lacey Lane and Santana Garrett.	
—	Vacated	February 9, 2019	—	—	—	—	Championship declared vacant after Tessa Blanchard was unable to defend the championship on February 9, 2019.	
5	Lady Flammer	February 9, 2019	The Crash	Tijuana, Baja California	1	1,084	This was a four-way match, also involving Christie Jaynes, Miranda Alize and Reina Isis.	
6	Sexy Star II	January 28, 2022	The Crash	Tijuana, Baja California	1	462	This was a three-way match, also involving Lady Flammer and Lady Maravilla.	
—	Vacated	May 5, 2023	—	—	—	—	Championship declared vacant after Sexy Star II was unable to defend the championship on May 5, 2023	
7	Dulce Tormenta	May 5, 2023	The Crash	Tijuana, Baja California	1	182	Defeated Jessie Jackson for the vacant title.	
8	Julissa Mexa	November 3, 2023	The Crash 12. Aniversario	Tijuana, Baja California	1	121	This was a five-way match, also involving Keyra, Trish Adora and Zamaya.	
9	Keyra	March 3, 2024	The Crash	Tijuana, Baja California	2	670+	This was a five-way match, also involving Ayako Hamada, Jessica Roden and Tiffany.	

== Combined reigns ==
†	Indicates the current champion

Rank	Wrestler	No. of reigns	Combined days
1	Lady Flammer	1	1,084
2	Sexy Star II	1	462
3	Keira	1	290
4	Tessa Blanchard	1	210
5	Dulce Tormenta	1	182
6	Lacey Lane	1	175
7	Sexy Dulce	1	130
8	Julissa Mexa †	1	791+
