= AAA vs. Elite =

2018 professional wrestling event

- Official poster depicting the two sides
- Promotion: Lucha Libre AAA Worldwide; Lucha Libre Elite
- Date: July 21, 2018
- City: Mexico City, Mexico
- Venue: Gimnasio Juan de la Barrera

Event chronology
← Previous; Verano de Escándalo	Next → Triplemanía XXVI

AAA vs. Elite (stylized as AAA vs. ELITE) was a major professional wrestling event produced and scripted by the Mexican professional wrestling promotion Lucha Libre AAA Worldwide (AAA) and Lucha Libre Elite. It took place on July 21, 2018, in the Gimnasio Olímpico Juan de la Barrera in Mexico City, Mexico.

== Production ==
=== Background ===
On June 26, 2018, it was announced that the Lucha Libre AAA Worldwide and Lucha Libre Elite had reached an agreement to hold events of wrestling in June 2018. In addition, fans were invited to attend dressed in red in case of supporting the fighters of AAA and blue if they are on the side of ELITE.

=== Storylines ===
The event will feature six professional wrestling matches with different wrestlers involved in pre-existing, scripted feuds, plots, and storylines. Wrestlers portray as either heels (referred to as rudos in Mexico, those that portray the "bad guys") or faces (técnicos in Mexico, the "good guy" characters) as they followed a series of tension-building events, which culminate in a wrestling match or series of matches.

== Matches ==
No.	Results	Stipulations
1	Team AAA (Faby Apache, La Hiedra and Vanilla Vargas) defeated Team Elite (Zeuxis, Keira and Lady Maravilla)	Six-woman tag team match
2	Team Elite (Trauma I and Trauma II) defeated Team AAA (Máximo and La Máscara)	Tag team match
3	Team Elite (El Hijo de L.A. Park and Taurus) defeated Team AAA (Aero Star and Argenis)	Tag team match
4	Team Elite (Jack Evans and Teddy Hart) defeated Team AAA (Pagano and Joe Líder)	Tag team match
5	Team AAA (El Texano Jr. and Rey Escorpión) defeated Team Elite (Laredo Kid and Golden Magic)	Tag team match
6	Team Elite (L.A. Park, Electroshock and Puma King) defeated Team AAA (Rey Wagner, El Hijo del Fantasma and Psycho Clown)	Tag team match

== See also ==
- 2018 in professional wrestling
