= Mad (professional wrestling) =

Professional wrestling stable

Stable
- Members: See below
- Name: Mad
- Former members: See below
- Debut: January 21, 2018
- Years active: 2018–2019

Mad, stylized as MAD, was a Mexican lucha libre, or professional wrestling group, referred to as a stable in wrestling terms, that worked for Lucha Libre AAA World Wide (AAA).

The group was created in 2018, after appearing on the independent promotion MDA with the original members that was Konnan, El Zorro, Kevin Kross, Sexy Dulce and Juventud Guerrera. Three months later, they appeared in AAA making some returns from the fighters like Teddy Hart and Jeff Jarrett being new members.

== History ==
=== MDA (2018) ===
The 21 as January as 2018 in Monterrey, during the fight between Rey Wagner and Alberto El Patrón, Konnan, Kross, Dulce, Zorro and Guerrera entered the ring to attack opponents.

=== AAA (2018–2019) ===
On April 21, MAD made their first appearance in Lucha Libre AAA Worldwide (AAA) in Tijuana, Baja California after the star fight between Wagner and Hernandez for the AAA Mega Championship in which Wagner managed to retain his title, appeared Kevin Kross, Teddy Hart and Juventud Guerrera. Guerrera took a microphone and introduced the attackers as the group MAD, which he said have reached AAA to "recover what is theirs" and seize as many titles and masks as possible, threatening that they will not be the only ones to arrive. On May 18 in Tehuacán, Kross teamed up with Hernández to be defeated by El Hijo del Fantasma and Psycho Clown, after which Juventud Guerrera appeared in surprise and pushed Psycho, which collided with Fantasma and led to the two of them starting a rivalry. Guerrera and Kross went up then and attacked both Técnicos, while on the stage appeared another mysterious fighter with a mask and MAD shirt watching them make the attack.

On June 3 at Verano de Escándalo, Juventud Guerrera and Kevin Kross teamed up with El Texano Jr. to win their victory against Pagano, Máximo and La Máscara. That same day, Guerrera introduced their MAD member and turned out to be Jeff Jarrett to announce who will be in the main event for the AAA Mega Championship, later Jarrett beats Wagner and Rey Mysterio Jr. to win the title for the second time with the help of Konnan who makes his return to the AAA. On March 20, 2019, Fantasma announced his departure from AAA as he signed with WWE removing himself from the group. In 2018, Jarrett would also leave the group as he would return to WWE and is a full-time member of the creative team for the company.

== Members ==
*	Founding member
I	First leader

=== Former ===
Member		Duration
Australian Suicide		August 25, 2018 – March 20, 2019
Brian Cage		July 21, 2018 – November 18, 2018
El Hijo del Fantasma		July 29, 2018 – March 30, 2019
El Zorro	*	January 21, 2018 – April 26, 2018
Jack Evans		July 13, 2018 – March 20, 2019
Jeff Jarrett	II	June 3, 2018 – October 28, 2018
Juventud Guerrera	*	January 21, 2018 – October 30, 2018
Konnan	* I	January 21, 2018 – March 20, 2019
Sexy Dulce	*	January 21, 2018 – April 2018
Kevin Kross	*	January 21, 2018 – March 16, 2019
Teddy Hart		April 21, 2018 – March 20, 2019

== Championships and accomplishments ==
- Lucha Libre AAA World Wide
  - AAA Mega Championship (1 time) – Jeff Jarrett
  - AAA Latin American Championship (1 time) – El Hijo del Fantasma
- Impact Wrestling
  - Impact X Division Championship (1 time)- Brian Cage

== See also ==
- La Sociedad
