= Dr. Wagner 50th Anniversary Show =

2011 International Wrestling Revolution Group event

- Official poster for the event
- Promotion: International Wrestling Revolution Group
- Date: October 16, 2011
- City: Naucalpan, State of Mexico
- Venue: Arena Naucalpan

Event chronology
← Previous; Guerra de Sexo	Next → El Castillo del Terror

The Dr. Wagner 50th Anniversary Show was a professional wrestling event that took place on October 16, 2011, at Arena Naucalpan in Naucalpan, State of Mexico. As the name indicates, the event commemorated the 50th anniversary of the debut of Manuel González Rivera, better known under the ring name Dr. Wagner, as well as the 7th anniversary of his death on September 13, 2004. The show was produced as a joint effort between International Wrestling Revolution Group (IWRG) and Promocion Wagner, owned and operated by González's son who wrestles as Dr. Wagner, Jr. The show included both sons of Dr. Wagner competing in the main event as Dr. Wagner, Jr., and Silver King competed in a match where the IWRG Intercontinental Heavyweight Championship was on the line as well as the masks of Dr. Wagner, Jr., and the remaining competitors, La Parka and Taboo.

== Background ==
The event featured five professional wrestling matches with different wrestlers, where some were involved in pre-existing scripted feuds or storylines and others simply put together by the matchmakers without a backstory. Being a professional wrestling event matches are not won legitimately through athletic competition; they are instead won via predetermined outcomes to the matches that is kept secret from the general public. Wrestlers portray either heels (the bad guys, referred to as Rudos in Mexico) or faces (fan favorites or Técnicos in Mexico).

Manuel González Rivera made his professional wrestling debut on July 16, 1961, under the ring name Centella Negra, in 1962 he adopted the ring name he would become world-famous under, Dr. Wagner. As Dr. Wagner he became one of the top performers in Mexico for a long period of time until he was forced to retire on April 27, 1986, after a car accident. González became the patriarch of a wrestling family that at the time of the show spanned three generations as both his sons became wrestlers as well, the oldest working as Dr. Wagner, Jr., and the youngest wrestling as Silver King / Silver Cain. The third generation Dinastia Wagner began wrestling in 2009 as El Hijo de Dr. Wagner made his debut. Manuel González died in 2004. Dr. Wagner, Jr.'s independent promotion Promociones Wagner joined up with IWRG in late 2011 to celebrate the 50th Anniversary of Dr. Wagner's debut, a collaboration made possible through Dr. Wagner, Jr.'s employer Lucha Libre AAA World Wide (AAA), who had a solid working relationship with IWRG that allowed the two smaller promotions to collaborate on the event. The show featured a mixture of IWRG, AAA and freelance wrestlers as well as wrestlers who were being trained by Dr. Wagner, Jr., at the time.

== Aftermath ==
Taboo held the IWRG Intercontinental Heavyweight Championship until December 25, 2011, when he lost it to Headhunter A as part of IWRG's Christmas show.

== Results ==
No.	Results	Stipulations
1	El Blazer defeated Avalon and Silver Star	Three-way match
2	Alan Extreme, Carta Brava, Jr. and Eterno defeated Astro Rey, Jr., Dinamic Black and Golden Magic	Two out of three falls six-man tag team match
3	Jennifer Blake and Sexy Star defeated Ludark Shaitan and Sexy Lady	Two out of three falls tag team match
4	Oficial 911 and Joe Líder defeated Oficial AK-47 and Violento Jack	Two out of three falls Relevos Increibles match
5	Los Psycho Circus (Monster Clown and Murder Clown) and Nicho el Millonario defeated Los Maniacos Psycho Clown (Electroshock and Último Gladiador)	Two out of three falls six-man Relevos Increibles match
6	Taboo (Mask) defeated Silver Cain (C) in a match that also included Dr. Wagner, Jr. (Mask) and La Parka (Mask)	Four-man Luchas de Apuestas, IWRG Intercontinental Heavyweight Championship vs. Mask vs. Mask vs. Mask steel cage match
