= Lucha Libre Elite =

Mexican professional wrestling promotion

- Acronym: LLE
- Founded: 2014–2019
- Defunct: 2022
- Style: Lucha libre
- Headquarters: Mexico City, Mexico
- Owner(s): Carlo Colín; Ernesto Santillan
- Formerly: Asociación de Lucha Libre Élite (2014–2015); All Elite (2014–2015)

Lucha Libre Elite, also referred to as simply Elite, was a Mexican professional wrestling promotion based in Mexico City, Mexico. The promotion, founded in 2014 as Asociación de Lucha Libre Élite (All Elite), is owned and managed by Carlo Colín and Ernesto Santillan. The Elite's promoters ran events in past years under the name "Proesa Entertainment". At one point the promotion had a weekly television show on Azteca 7.

== History ==
As All Elite they ran their first wrestling event on July 19, 2014, in Deportivo Morelos at Mexico City. On October 20, the promotion announced through Twitter a partnership with Consejo Mundial de Lucha Libre (CMLL). L.A. Park and El Hijo de L.A. Park appeared in Arena México at CMLL's Día de Muertos show to announce the "All Elite League" tournament, between CMLL and independent wrestlers. First two events to run together All Elite and CMLL were scheduled to be held on November 13 in Arena Puebla and November 15 in Arena Coliseo Mexico. By October 2015, It was announced the Elite League was dropped due to too many wrestlers coming and going from the promotion. And In early 2018 CMLL and Elite Parted Ways and could not use CMLL venues like Arena México, after that Lucha Elite partnered with International Wrestling Revolution Group (IWRG), and used IWRG's Arena Naucalpan for additional shows.

On June 26, 2018, it was announced that the Lucha Libre AAA Worldwide and Lucha Libre Elite had reached an agreement and would co-promote wrestling events in the future, as well as wrestlers representing Lucha Libre Elite would appear on AAA shows. In addition, fans were invited to attend dressed in red in case of supporting the fighters of AAA and blue if they are on the side of Elite. On July 21, 2018, Lucha Libre Elite and Lucha Libre AAA Worldwide announced a partnership and co-promoted a show called AAA vs. Elite sponsored by World of Warcraft: Battle for Azeroth. the Lucha Libre Elite roster was also in Triplemanía XXVI. LLE has also partnered with MDA to hold a show in Arena Naucalpan.

== Championships ==
Championship	Current champion(s)	Reign	Date won	Location	Event	Previous champion(s)	Days held
Elite Heavyweight Championship	Deactivated	–		N/A	N/A	Cibernético	N/A
Elite Middleweight Championship	Deactivated	–		N/A	N/A	Carístico	N/A
Elite Welterweight Championship	Deactivated	–		N/A	N/A	Bandido	N/A
Elite World Championship	Deactivated	–		N/A	N/A	Michael Elgin	N/A

== See also ==
- List of professional wrestling promotions in Mexico
- All Elite Wrestling
