= Guerra de Sexos (2011) =

2011 International Wrestling Revolution Group event

- Official poster promoting the main event match
- Promotion: International Wrestling Revolution Group
- Date: September 16, 2011
- City: Naucalpan, State of Mexico
- Venue: Arena Naucalpan
- Tagline(s): "Guerra de Sexos de Máscaras y Cabelleras" ("Battle of the Sexes for masks and hair")

Event chronology
← Previous; 40 Años de Dos Caras	Next → Dr. Wagner 50th Anniversary Show

IWRG Guerra de Sexos chronology
← Previous; First	Next → 2012

Guerra de Sexos (2011) (Spanish for "Battle of the Sexes") was the first annual Guerra de Sexos professional wrestling event produced by the International Wrestling Revolution Group. It took place on September 16, 2011, at Arena Naucalpan in Naucalpan, State of Mexico. The event title referred to the main event match, a steel cage match that featured male wrestlers, female wrestlers, Exótico wrestlers and Mini-Estrellas all competing against each other. The last person in the cage would be forced to either remove their wrestling mask, or if already unmask have their hair shaved off under the Lucha de Apuestas, or bet match, rules.

== Production ==
=== Background ===
Starting as far back as at least 2000, the Mexican wrestling promotion International Wrestling Revolution Group (IWRG; Sometimes referred to as Grupo Internacional Revolución in Spanish) has held several annual events where the main event was a multi-man steel cage match where the last wrestler left in the cage would be forced to either remove their wrestling mask or have their hair shaved off under Lucha de Apuestas, or "bet match", rules. Starting in 2011 IWRG began holding a special version of the steel cage match concept under the name Guerra de Sexos, or "War of the Sexes", as they held a show centered on an inter-gender steel cage match main event that saw men and women fight each other with their mask or hair on the line. At times IWRG also included Mini-Estrella competitors and Exótico wrestlers in the cage as well. The inter-gender aspects of the show distinguishes the Guerra de Sexos events from other Steel cage matches held throughout the year such as the IWRG El Castillo del Terror ("The Tower of Terror"), IWRG Guerra del Golfo ("Gulf War") or IWRG Prison Fatal ("Deadly Prison") shows. The Guerra de Sexos shows, as well as the majority of the IWRG shows in general, are held in "Arena Naucalpan", owned by the promoters of IWRG and their main arena. The 2011 Guerra de Sexos show was the first year IWRG promoted a show under that name.

=== Storylines ===
The event featured four professional wrestling matches with different wrestlers involved in pre-existing scripted feuds, plots and storylines. Wrestlers were portrayed as either heels (referred to as rudos in Mexico, those that portray the "bad guys") or faces (técnicos in Mexico, the "good guy" characters) as they followed a series of tension-building events, which culminated in a wrestling match or series of matches.

== Results ==
No.	Results	Stipulations
1	IWRG Gym (Saruman, Alan Extreme, Centvrión, Dark Devil, Imposible, Keshin Black and Tritón) defeated Gym Ojo de Tigre (Extreme Boy, Impulso, Kamuz, Ojo de Tigre, Jr., Oscuro, Vaquero Rocanrolero and Wotan) – Saruman was the sole survivor	Torneo FIL Copa Higher Power Torneo cibernetico elimination match
2	Los Oficiales (Oficial 911, Oficial AK-47 and Oficial Fierro) defeated Los Gringos VIP (Apolo Estrada, Jr., El Hijo del Diablo and Picudo, Jr.)	Six-man Lumberjack's with leather straps match
3	Bestia 666, Carta Brava, Jr. and Fresero, Jr. defeated Centvrión, Dinamic Black and Golden Magic – Two falls to one	Best two-out-of-three falls six-man tag team match
4	Multifacético defeated Avisman; Also in the match: El Hijo de L.A. Park, El Hijo del Diablo, King Drako, La Diva Salvaje, Ludark Shaitan, Polvo de Estrellas, Rossy Moreno, Sexy Lady and Yuriko	Intergender 10 person Mask vs. Hair Steel Cage Match

Order of escape

1. King Drako
2. La Diva Salvaje
3. Polvo de Estrellas
4. Ludark Shaitan
5. Sexy Lady
6. Yuriko
7. Rossy Moreno
8. El Hijo de L.A. Park
9. El Hijo del Diablo
10. Multifacético
