= Lady Shani =

Mexican masked wrestler

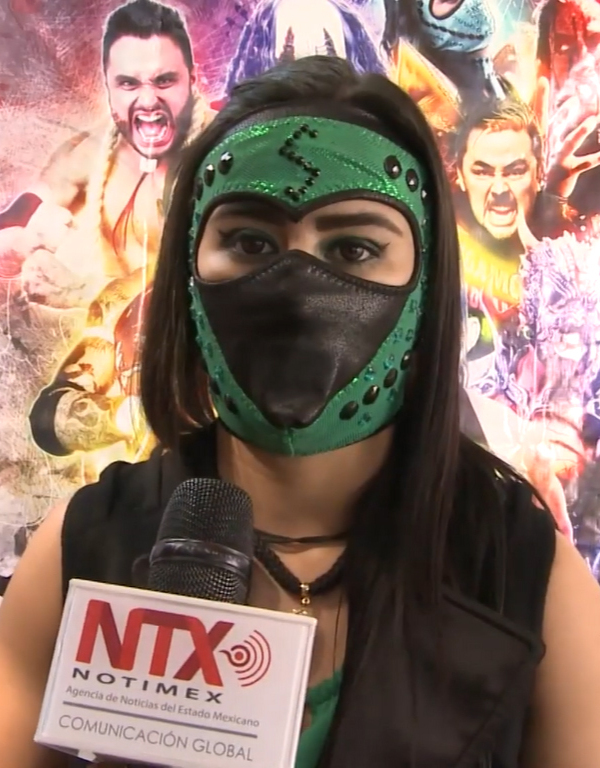
- Shani in 2019

Personal information
- Born: Unrevealed (Note: Traditionally Mexican sources will not report on the birth name of a masked wrestler who has never been unmasked in the ring.); March 2, 1993 (age 33) Mexico City, Mexico
- Relative: Ludark Shaitan (cousin)
- Website: Twitter account

Professional wrestling career
- Ring name(s): Sexy Lady; Lady Shani
- Billed height: 1.68 m (5 ft 6 in)
- Billed weight: 85 kg (187 lb)
- Trained by: Dr. Karonte; Chamaco Valaguez; Silver King
- Debut: December 2009

Lady Shani (born March 2, 1993) is the ring name of a Mexican professional wrestler, under contract with Lucha Libre AAA Worldwide. She made her debut in 2009 and until 2015 worked under the more generic name Sexy Lady before adopting her current name that same year. Initially she portrayed a ruda (a heel, or villain) but in 2017 she changed sides and became a tecnica (the face, or fan favorite). She is the cousin of Ludark Shaitan, with whom she both teamed with and fought against early in her career. Lady Shani's real name is not a matter of public record, which is traditional for masked wrestlers in Mexico who have not been unmasked.

She is a two time AAA Reina de Reinas Champion in AAA; first from 2017 to early 2018, and again from December 2018 to June 2019. One of the highlights of her career was a Lucha de Apuestas ("bet match") win over Faby Apache at Triplemanía XXVI, where Apache was forced to have her hair shaved off afterward.

== Professional wrestling career ==
Lady Shani was trained for her professional wrestling career by Dr. Karonte, (Note: There are several luchadors who have used the "Dr. Karontes" name, this is the original – the father of Carístico.) Platino, (Note: The second Platino, not Chamaco Valaguez) and Silver King at various times. Her in-ring debut has been listed as December 2009, but no official record of what the match was has been found. Starting out, she worked as the masked ring character "Sexy Lady", working for the Hardcore wrestling promotion Desastre Total Ultraviolento (DTU). The mask she wore while working as "Sexy Lady" featured a silouette of a woman on the front, positioned between the eye openings of the mask.

In her first full year as a professional wrestler she started working for International Wrestling Revolution Group (IWRG) on a freelance basis. Her first major appearance for IWRG was at their Guerra de Empresas ("War of the Promotions") show" on January 2, 2011, where she, teamed up with Aeroboy and Comando Negro for an inter-gender match loss to Ludark Shaitan, Dinamic Black and Violento Jack. The following April, at the next Guerra de Empresas show, Sexy Lady Chiva Rayada I, and Mini Charly Manson wrestled to a "No Contest" against Fresero Jr., Ludark Shaitan and Mascarita Sagrada. On July 16, 2011, Sexy Lady and Dement Xtreme defeated Shaitan and Ojo Diabolico Jr. to become the first ever holders of the Xreme Mexican Wrestling Mixed Tag Team Championship. The team would later lose the title to Shaitan and Ojo Diabolico Jr., but regain it at IWRG's Guerra de Campeones ("War of the Champions") on December 25, 2011. While in IWRG, she participated in two intergender steel cage matches where the loser would be forced to unmask or have their hair shaved off, first at La Guerra de Sexos ("the war of the sexes") and then at Guerra del Golfo ("Gulf War"), both times escaping the cage to retain her mask.

=== Lucha Libre AAA Worldwide (2012–present) ===
On April 27, 2012, Sexy Lady made her debut for AAA, one of Mexico's largest wrestling promotions. In her first AAA match she teamed up with Mari Apache, losing to Faby Apache and Lolita. In early 2013 Sexy Lady was one of eight women competing for the vacant AAA Reina de Reinas Championship ("Queen of Queen Championship"), but was eliminated in the first round by Faby Apache.

In September 2015 she was reintroduced with a new ring character, the ruda (heel, or villain) character "Lady Shani". The ring character was inspired by the Japanese Ninja culture, expressed both in her mask and entrance robes. She made her debut under that name on November 20, 2015, where she, the Exótico Mamba and the Mini-Estrella Mini Charly Manson lost to Goya Kong, Pimpinela Escarlata and Dinastia. Lady Shani, along with La Hiedra, Goya Kong and Lady Maravilla were all unsuccessful in their efforts to win the Reina de Reinas championship from Taya Valkyrie at the Héroes Inmortales IX show, Lady Shani's first championship match in AAA. The following year she was one of the competitors in the annual Copa Antonio Peña, which for the first time featured both male and female wrestlers fighting each other. The tournament was won by Pimpinela Escarlata.

In early 2017 AAA started a storyline that would eventually lead to Lady Shani becoming a tecnico (those that portray the fan favorites in wrestling), the faces, in AAA as she was attacked by Taya after a match at the 2017 Guerra de Titanes show. As part of the story-line transition from rudo to tecnico Lady Shani was teamed up with Venom, a young, sympathetic tecnico in a tournament for the vacant AAA World Mixed Tag Team Championship. During the match, La Hiedra, Lady Shani's regular tag team partner, came to ringside and interfered in the match, causing Big Mami and Niño Hamburguesa to win the match and the championship. After the match, Lady Shani and La Hiedra argued, but the tecnico turn was not completed that night. The tension between Lady Shani and La Hiedra caused the two to not being able to win the vacant AAA Reina de Reinas Championship, which instead was won by Sexy Star in a match that also included Big Mami, Faby Apache and Goya Kong. On July 27, 2017, Lady Shani finally worked as a full-fledged tecnico as she defeated La Hiera, Goya Kong and Mamba to become the number 1 contender for the Reina de Reinas championship.

The Reina de Reinas championship match at Triplemanía XXV was overshadowed by the unscripted nature of the finish of the match. The match saw Sexy Star defend the championship against Lady Shani, Ayako Hamada and Rosemary from Impact Wrestling. During the match, some of the exchanges between Lady Shani and Sexy Star were rougher than they were planned to be, which led Sexy Star to believe that Lady Shani was "Shooting" (legitimately fighting with her instead of the pre-planned match) and left the ring for a period of time. Later on, Sexy Star ended up in the ring with Rosemary, applying an armbar submission hold for the planned finish. After Rosemary gave up, Sexy Star deliberately pulled back hard on the arm, dislocating Rosemary's shoulder. Afterward Sexy Star claimed that she was not trying to intentionally hurt Rosemary during the match. The incident was widely reported outside of Mexico, including a story in Rolling Stone magazine, the New York Post, and as far away as Australia. In the fall-out after the match AAA stripped Sexy Star of the championship. Cody Rhodes and Road Dogg have both criticized Sexy Star, with Road Dogg calling for her to be blacklisted, and per CageMatch has not been booked since Triplemania XXV.

On October 1, 2017, at Héroes Inmortales XI Lady Shani defeated Ayako Hamada to win the vacant AAA Reina de Reinas Championship, starting her first championship reign in AAA. The following month, Lady Shani won her first Lucha de Apuestas, or "bet match", where she pinned Venus and then forced her to unmask. Lucha de Apuestas wins, especially a mask win, is considered a very prestigious win in Lucha Libre and a sign of a promotion's support of that wrestler.

Following her Apuestas win Lady Shani was paired up with Faby Apache for her next story-line feud. At the time Apache was the longest tenured female wrestler in AAA and had been a fixture in the top rank of the division, facts that AAA wove into the feud as Apache got rougher and more brutal in her matches against Lady Shani to show her "displeasure" over Lady Shani's ascension. In her role of the "veteran wrestler", Faby Apache looked down on Lady Shani, trying to teach her some respect for Apache. As part of the feud, Faby Apache defeated Lady Shani to win the Reina de Reinas Championship in January 2018. As the feud continued to escalate over the spring and summer of 2018 AAA finally booked the two rivals in a Lucha de Apuestas feature match for Triplemanía XXVI, billed as AAA's most important show of the year. In the match, Lady Shani "bet" her mask against Faby Apache's hair since Apache did not wrestle in a mask. The match took place on August 25, 2018, in the third-to-last match of the night. Both Lady Shani and Faby Apache bled profusely during the match, to help illustrate the intensity of their rivalry. In the end, Lady Shani won the match and Faby Apache was forced to have all her hair shaved off per lucha libre traditions.

In the fall AAA started a Facebook Live exclusive tournament called Lucha Capital that saw Lady Shani wrestle against Lady Maravilla twice, ending with a victory and a loss in the preliminary round of the tournament. On December 12, 2018, Lady Shani regained the AAA Reina de Reinas Championship at AAA's annual Guerra de Titanes show to start her second reign. During the final round of women's Lucha Capital tournament Lady Shani announced that she was dropping out of the tournament, but extended a challenge to the eventual tournament winner for a future match. Taya won the tournament and the Lucha Capital tournament, starting a story-line between Taya and her former protege.

On June 16, 2019, at Verano de Escándalo Shani lost the title to Keyra on June 16, 2019.

== Personal life ==
Because Lady Shani has never lost a Lucha de Apuestas match at this point in her career, her personal life is not a matter of public record; which is traditional in Lucha Libre. The only publicly available information is that which she chooses to disclose, which includes that she was born on March 2, 1993, in Mexico City. She has publicly acknowledged that she is the cousin of professional wrestler Ludark Shaitan. Early in both of their careers the two cousins would often either team up together or fight against each other for various promotions on the independent circuit.

== Championships and accomplishments ==
- Lucha Libre AAA Worldwide
  - AAA Reina de Reinas Championship (2 times)
  - Lucha Fighter (Women 2020)
  - Copa Triplemanía Femenil (2020)
  - Reina de Reinas (2024)
- Pro Wrestling Illustrated
  - Ranked No. 40 of the top 100 female wrestlers in the PWI Female 100 in 2019
- Xtreme Mexican Wrestling
  - XMW Mixed Tag Team Championship (2 times, current) – with Demete Xtreme
- Xtreme Wrestling League
  - XWL Border Tag Team Championship (1 time) – with Ludark Shaitan

== Luchas de Apuestas record ==
Winner (wager)	Loser (wager)	Location	Event	Date	Notes
Lady Shani (mask)	Venus (mask)	Juarez, Chihuahua, Mexico	AAA show	November 19, 2017	
Lady Shani (mask)	Faby Apache (hair)	Mexico City, Mexico	Triplemanía XXVI	August 25, 2018	
