= Karrion Kross =

American professional wrestler (born 1985)

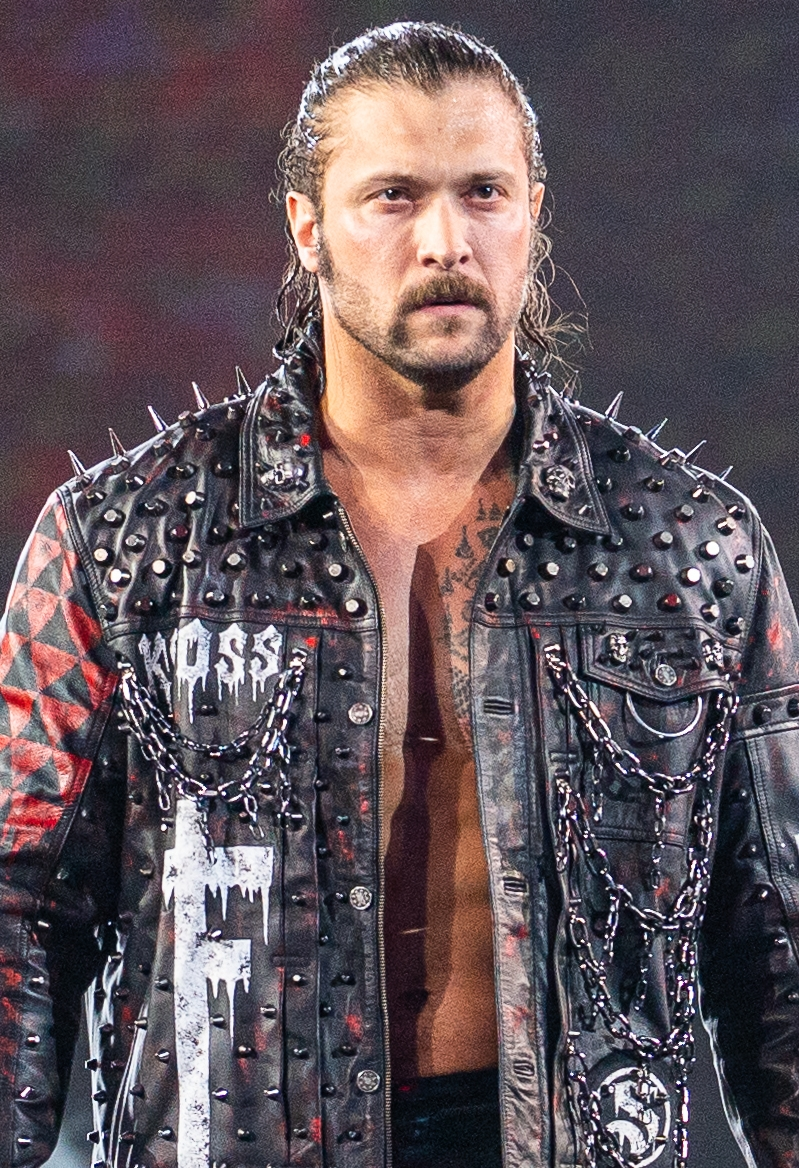
- Kross in 2024

Personal information
- Born: Kevin Robert Kesar; July 19, 1985 (age 41) New York City, New York, U.S.
- Spouse: Scarlett Bordeaux (m. 2022)

Professional wrestling career
- Ring name(s): Karrion Kross; Kevin Kross; Killer Kross; The White Rabbit
- Billed height: 6 ft 4 in (193 cm)
- Billed weight: 265 lb (120 kg)
- Billed from: Las Vegas, Nevada; Sin City
- Trained by: Glenn Gilbertti; Michael Modest
- Debut: September 6, 2014

Kevin Robert Kesar (born July 19, 1985), is an American professional wrestler. He is working as a freelancer, primarily for Major League Wrestling (MLW) under the ring name Killer Kross. He also makes appearances on the independent circuit. He is best known for his tenures in WWE, where he performed under the ring name Karrion Kross.

Prior to his tenure in WWE, Kesar performed for Impact Wrestling, Lucha Libre AAA Worldwide (AAA), and multiple promotions on the independent circuit under the ring names Kevin Kross and Killer Kross. In AAA, he was a member of the MAD and La Facción Ingobernable stables. He has also appeared on season four of AAA's American project Lucha Underground as The White Rabbit, a member of Paul London's Rabbit Tribe stable.

Kesar signed with WWE in February 2020 under the ring name Karrion Kross and began a winning streak on their NXT developmental brand that led him to winning the NXT Championship before having to relinquish it due to injury. Kross regained the title in April 2021 at NXT TakeOver: Stand & Deliver. After making his main roster debut on the Raw brand that July, his winning streak was immediately broken, he lost the NXT Championship to Samoa Joe the following month, and his on-screen character was subsequently altered. WWE released Kesar in November 2021 and began making appearances in various independent promotions, as well as brief appearances in Major League Wrestling (MLW) and New Japan Pro-Wrestling (NJPW). He returned to WWE in August 2022 and performed there until August 2025, when his contract expired.

== Early life ==
Kevin Robert Kesar was born on July 19, 1985 in New York City. He is of Central American, Puerto Rican, Italian, Greek, Scandinavian, Croatian, British, and Irish descent.

Kesar spent parts of his early life in New York and Toronto, Canada. His father, Ted Concepcion, was a Puerto Rican amateur wrestler who later trained in jiujitsu and became friends with Ricco Rodriguez and Ricardo Pires.

== Professional wrestling career ==
=== Independent circuit (2014–2020) ===
On September 6, 2014, Kesar made professional wrestling debut as Kevin Kross at Future Stars of Wrestling (FSW) In 2015, he also participated on Global Force Wrestling GFW Amped taping. Kross made a one-off appearance for WWE on the February 16, 2015, episode of Raw, teaming with Darren Young against The Ascension in a match that ended in a no contest.On October 23, Kross faced Brian Myers and Kongo Kong in a three-way number one contenders match for the GFW Global Championship, which was won by Kong. In 2018, Kesar adopted the ring name Killer Kross. On July 5, 2019 at FSW Natural Born Killers, Kross wrestled Jon Moxley to a no contest. After the match, Moxley was so impressed by Kross that he gave Triple H's contact and was signed by WWE.

=== Lucha Underground (2015–2018) ===
Between 2015 and 2016, Kevin Kross worked multiple dark matches for Lucha Underground. On December 14, 2015, Kross made his debut for the promotion, defeating Vinny Massaro in a dark match.

On July 11, 2018, Kross returned with a new character called The White Rabbit, he gave his wooden scepter to Paul London and ordered him to murder Mascarita Sagrada in cold blood for leading the Rabbit Tribe to his secret lair.

=== Lucha Libre AAA Worldwide (2017–2020) ===
On March 19, 2017, as Kevin Kross, he made his AAA debut at Rey de Reyes, helping Johnny Mundo to win the AAA Mega Championship, AAA Latin American Championship and AAA World Cruiserweight Championship. He made his in-ring debut on April 12, teaming with Johnny Mundo and Taya to defeat Argenis, Ayako Hamada and El Hijo del Fantasma in a No Disqualification six-man tag team match. On June 4, Kross competed in a steel cage triple threat against El Hijo del Fantasma and El Texano Jr. at Verano de Escándalo, the match ended in a no contest after both Fantasma and Texano Jr. escaped the cage at the same time. On April 20, 2018, Kross return to AAA, aligning with Juventud Guerrera and Teddy Hart to attack Dr. Wagner Jr. and Hernandez. The trio called themselves MAD.

On August 3, 2019 at Triplemanía XXVII, Kross teamed with Los Mercenarios (Texano Jr. and Taurus) to face Psycho Clown, Cody Rhodes, and the debuting Cain Velasquez; Kross' team was defeated. On December 14 at Guerra de Titanes, Kross joined Rush's new La Facción Ingobernable stable.

=== Impact Wrestling (2018–2019) ===
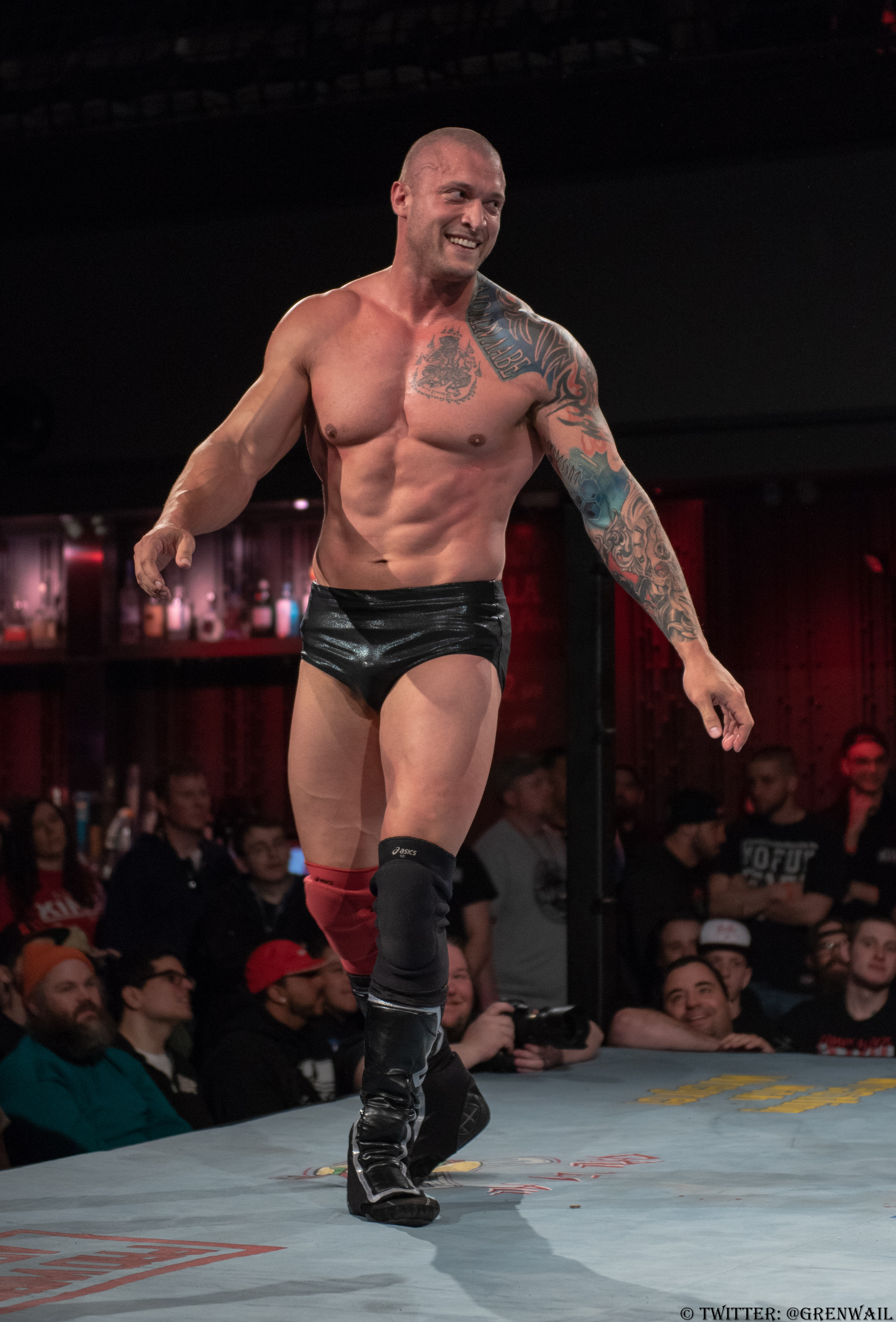
Kross in 2019

On the June 14, 2018 episode of Impact, Kesar, as Killer Kross, made his debut in a backstage segment posing as a police officer, arresting Petey Williams for being the suspected mystery X attacker who had been laying out talent and personnel backstage for several weeks. Once in a secluded area backstage, however, Kross attacked and choked a handcuffed Williams, revealing himself as the actual attacker. Kross made his in-ring debut on the July 5 episode of Impact, defeating Fallah Bahh. Two weeks later, Kross defeated Williams via referee stoppage after applying a choke hold.

On the August 9 episode of Impact, Kross helped Austin Aries retain his Impact World Championship against Eddie Edwards, hitting the latter with a Saito Suplex following a ref bump. Aries announced Kross as his "insurance policy" the following week. The duo were joined by Moose, who betrayed Edwards during a tag team match on August 30. At Bound for Glory on October 14, Kross and Moose were defeated by Edwards and Tommy Dreamer in an impromptu tag match. In the main event, Kross and Moose were in the corner of Aries as he lost the Impact World Championship to Johnny Impact.

After his alliance with Aries ended, Kross entered a storyline with Impact, in which Kross told Impact that he needed him to keep up Impact's title run much longer. At Homecoming on January 6, 2019, Kross attacked both Impact and his wife Taya Valkyrie after the main event. On the January 25 episode of Impact!, Kross challenged Impact for the World Championship, however, the match ended in a double disqualification. At Impact Wrestling: Uncaged, Kross lost a fatal four-way for the title that also featured Moose and Brian Cage. Kross then entered into a feud with Eddie Edwards in May after Kross destroyed a kendo stick that was gifted to Edwards by Tommy Dreamer. This resulted in them wrestling in hardcore matches such as a street fight and first blood match.

On May 13, it was reported that Kross asked for his release from Impact Wrestling following contract renegotiations. His issue stemmed from problems with his creative direction, as well as his current pay per appearance deal. He was not released at the time. At Slammiversary XVII on July 7, Kross lost a first blood match to Eddie Edwards, where he reportedly refused to do a blade job and they used fake blood instead. Reports indicated there was concern over "lack of blood testing and the absence of an on-site doctor." Following that match, he was not booked to appear at the July, August or September television tapings and the two sides continued to negotiate. It was reported that his contract was set to expire in December but that the company had the option to roll it over for another year. In December, Impact Wrestling released Kross from his contract.

=== Major League Wrestling (2020) ===
Kross made his debut for Major League Wrestling (MLW) at the Fightland event on February 1, 2020, where he defeated Tom Lawlor.

=== WWE (2020–2021) ===
Kross signed with WWE in February 2020. After a series of vignettes, he and Scarlett appeared on the April 8 episode of NXT, and Kross made his in-ring debut the following week by attacking Tommaso Ciampa. On May 6, under the ring name Karrion Kross, he defeated Leon Ruff in his televised in-ring debut. At TakeOver: In Your House on June 7, he defeated Ciampa by technical submission. On August 22 at TakeOver: XXX, Kross defeated Keith Lee to win the NXT Championship. However, he suffered a separated shoulder during the match and vacated the title on the August 26 episode of NXT, ending his reign after four days, the shortest in the championship's history.

Kross returned on the December 9 episode of NXT, attacking Damian Priest, whom he defeated at New Year's Evil on January 6, 2021. On April 8 at NXT TakeOver: Stand & Deliver, he defeated Finn Bálor to win the NXT Championship for the second time. He successfully defended the championship against a number of challengers, including Bálor, Pete Dunne, Kyle O'Reilly, Johnny Gargano, and Adam Cole. At NXT TakeOver 36 on August 22, Kross lost the championship to Samoa Joe, ending his second reign and marking his final match in NXT before moving to the main roster.

While NXT Champion, Kross made his main roster debut on the July 19, 2021, episode of Raw, losing to Jeff Hardy in a non-title match. The result drew criticism from fans and wrestling commentators, who felt it undermined his presentation as a dominant champion. After losing the NXT Championship, he was officially moved to Raw on August 23, where he debuted a new entrance look without Scarlett. The change was widely criticized, including by WWE Hall of Famer Mick Foley, who argued that the presentation weakened Kross's character. Kross and Scarlett were released from their WWE contracts on November 4, 2021, ending their tenure with the company.

=== Return to MLW (2022) ===
In February 2022, Kross made his return to MLW, where he was absent for 2 years. He won his return debut match at SuperFight against Budd Heavy by referee stoppage.

=== Return to independent circuit (2022) ===
On July 31, at Ric Flair's Last Match event, Kross defeated Davey Boy Smith Jr..

=== New Japan Pro Wrestling (2022) ===
Kross made his New Japan Pro-Wrestling (NJPW) at the Lonestar Shootout event, losing to Minoru Suzuki. Kross returned during the Collision 2022 tapings, defeating Yuya Uemura.

=== Return to WWE (2022–2025) ===
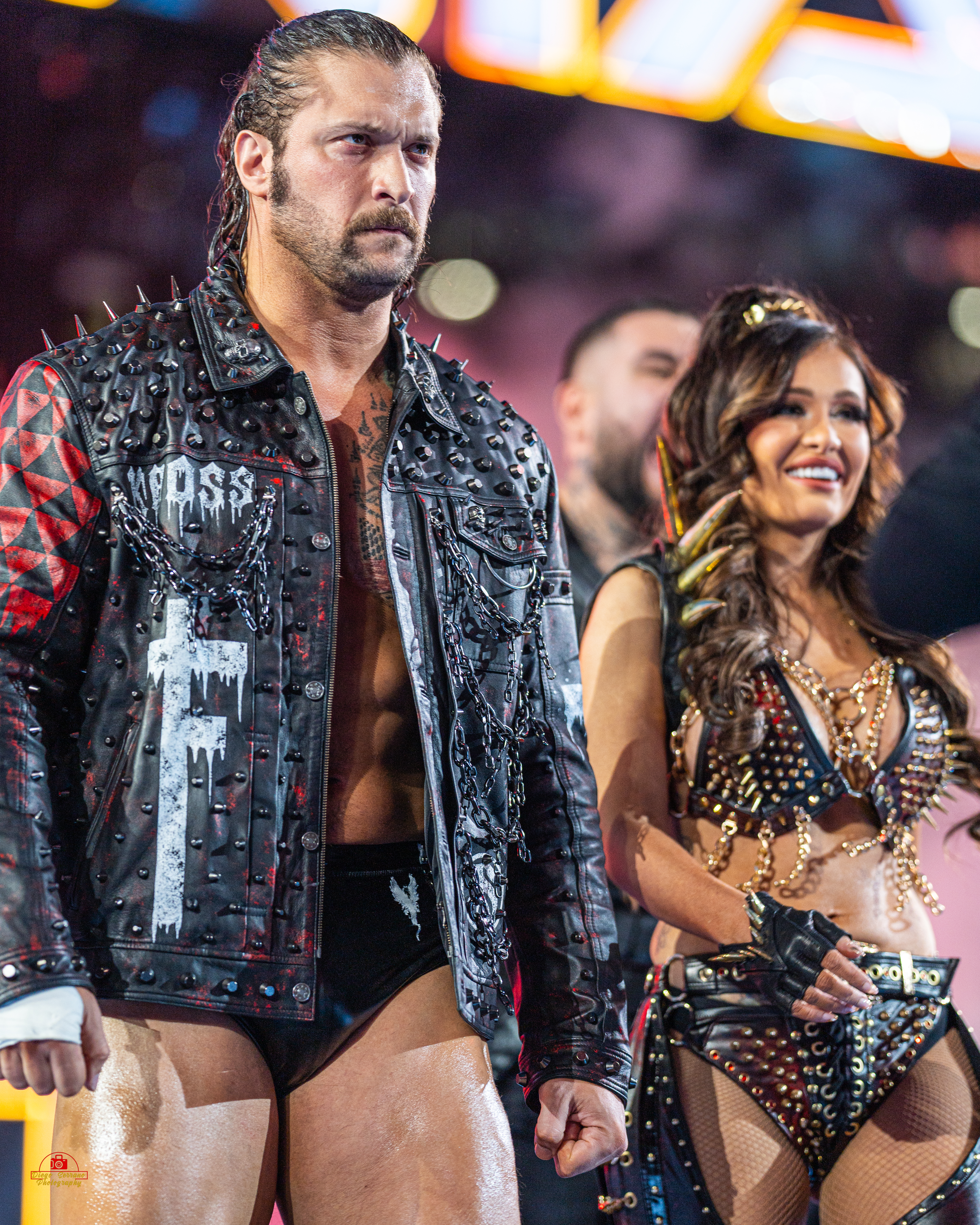
Kross and Scarlett at WrestleMania XL

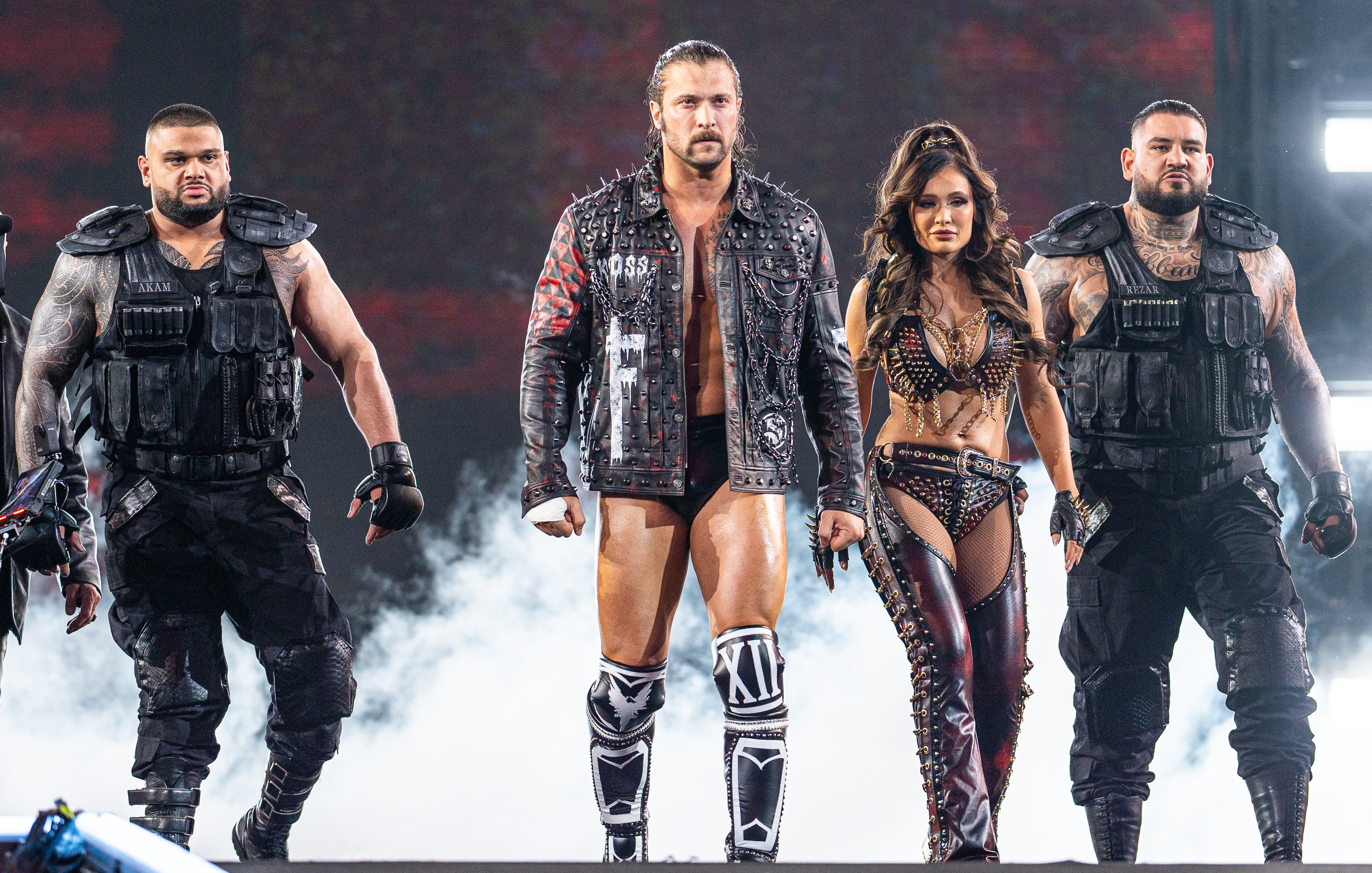
The Final Testament at WrestleMania XL

Kesar made his unannounced return to WWE as Karrion Kross on the August 5, 2022 episode of SmackDown, accompanied by Scarlett, attacking Drew McIntyre and establishing himself as a member of the SmackDown brand. He defeated McIntyre in a strap match at Extreme Rules, but lost to him in a steel cage match at Crown Jewel.

In December 2023, Kross aligned with the Authors of Pain (Akam and Rezar) and Paul Ellering, forming the stable The Final Testament alongside Scarlett. The group feuded with Bobby Lashley and The Street Profits, culminating in a Philadelphia Street Fight at WrestleMania XL, where The Final Testament lost to Lashley and the Street Profits, collectively known as The Pride. The faction subsequently feuded with The New Day (Kofi Kingston and Xavier Woods), attempting to create tension between the duo. The rivalry ended on the August 19 episode of Raw, when The Final Testament lost to The New Day and Odyssey Jones.

Following the release of the Authors of Pain and Ellering in February 2025, The Final Testament disbanded, leaving Kross and Scarlett as its remaining members. Kross subsequently adopted the role of "The Devil's Advocate", appearing in backstage segments in which he attempted to persuade other wrestlers to embrace their darker sides, including Sami Zayn and AJ Styles. At WrestleMania 41, he became involved in Styles' match against Logan Paul, attempting to convince Styles to use brass knuckles against Paul. Later, Kross delivered a promo criticizing WWE and his booking during the event's recap show, which generated increased attention from fans. He subsequently feuded with Zayn, facing him at Night of Champions and SummerSlam, the latter being his final WWE match.

Kross and Scarlett departed WWE on August 10, 2025, after their contracts expired without being renewed, ending Kross's second tenure with the company. Kross later stated that WWE had offered him a new contract but given him 24 hours to accept it, and that Scarlett had not received a contract offer.

=== Second return to independent circuit (2025–present) ===
On August 23 at GCW Homecoming, Kesar, as Killer Kross, and Scarlett made their first post-WWE appearance, where they attacked Matt Cardona. On September 19, Kross made an appearance for DEFY Wrestling at DEFY Aeon, where he defeated Calvin Tankman to become the inaugural Super Heavyweight Cup winner.

=== Second return to MLW (2025–present) ===
Kross made his return to MLW on November 20, 2025 at Don Gato Tequila, where he defeated Matt Riddle. On January 29, 2026 at Battle Riot VIII, Kross entered and won the Battle Riot match, winning the MLW World Heavyweight Championship. On November 7 at, Kross lost the title to Josh Bishop in a Last Man Standing match at Saturday Night SuperFight, ending his reign at 282 days.

== Other media ==
Karrion Kross made his video game debut as a playable character in WWE 2K22 and has since appeared in WWE SuperCard, WWE 2K23, WWE 2K24 and WWE 2K25.

He also appeared on the short action film Blue Evening, where he also serves as an executive producer for the film.

Kross has written a memoir, Life is Fighting, (2025). A separate biography, The Karrion Kross Untold Story: A Complete Biography of WWE's Most Feared Competitor by Gustavo Williams, was also published in 2025.

== Personal life ==
Kesar is married to fellow professional wrestler Elizabeth Chihaia, better known by her ring name Scarlett Bordeaux. After becoming engaged on September 23, 2021, they married in April 2022 in a private ceremony on a glacier.

== Championships and accomplishments ==
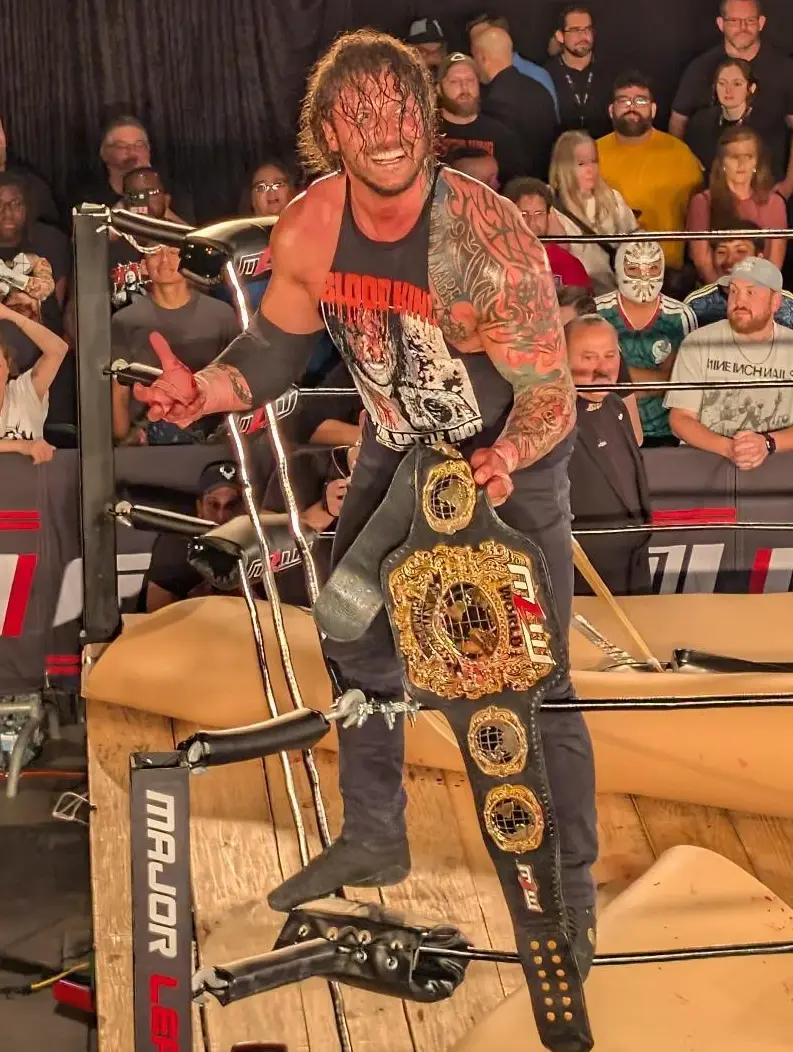
Kross as the MLW World Heavyweight Champion in 2026

- Awesome Championship Wrestling
  - ACW Heavyweight Championship (1 time, current)
- Cauliflower Alley Club
  - Rising Star Award (2018)
- DEFY Wrestling
  - Super Heavyweight Cup (2025)
- Future Stars of Wrestling
  - FSW Heavyweight Championship (1 time)
  - FSW Mecca Grand Championship (1 time)
- Impact Wrestling
  - Impact Year End Award (1 time)
    - One to Watch in 2019 (2018)
- Major League Wrestling
  - MLW World Heavyweight Championship (1 time)
  - Battle Riot VIII (2026)
- Maverick Pro Wrestling
  - Maverick Pro Heavyweight Championship (2 times)
- Modern Vintage Wrestling
  - MVW Heavyweight Championship (1 time)
- Masters of Ring Entertainment
  - MORE Wrestling World Championship (1 time, final)
- Noble Champions Group
  - NCG Sovereign States Championship (1 time, current)
- Pro Wrestling Illustrated
  - Ranked No. 16 of the top 500 singles wrestlers in the PWI 500 in 2021
- Ring Warriors
  - Ring Warriors Grand Championship (1 time, final)
- Romania Pro Wrestling
  - RPW Heavyweight Championship (1 time, current)
- Stand Alone Wrestling
  - PWAD Championship (1 time)
- The Wrestling Revolver
  - Revolver Championship (1 time)
- World Series Wrestling
  - WSW World Heavyweight Championship (1 time)
- WWE
  - NXT Championship (2 times)

== Bibliography ==
- Life Is Fighting (ECW Press, 2025, Paperback) ISBN 1-77041-849-0, ISBN 978-1770418493
