= Taya Valkyrie =

Canadian professional wrestler (born 1983)

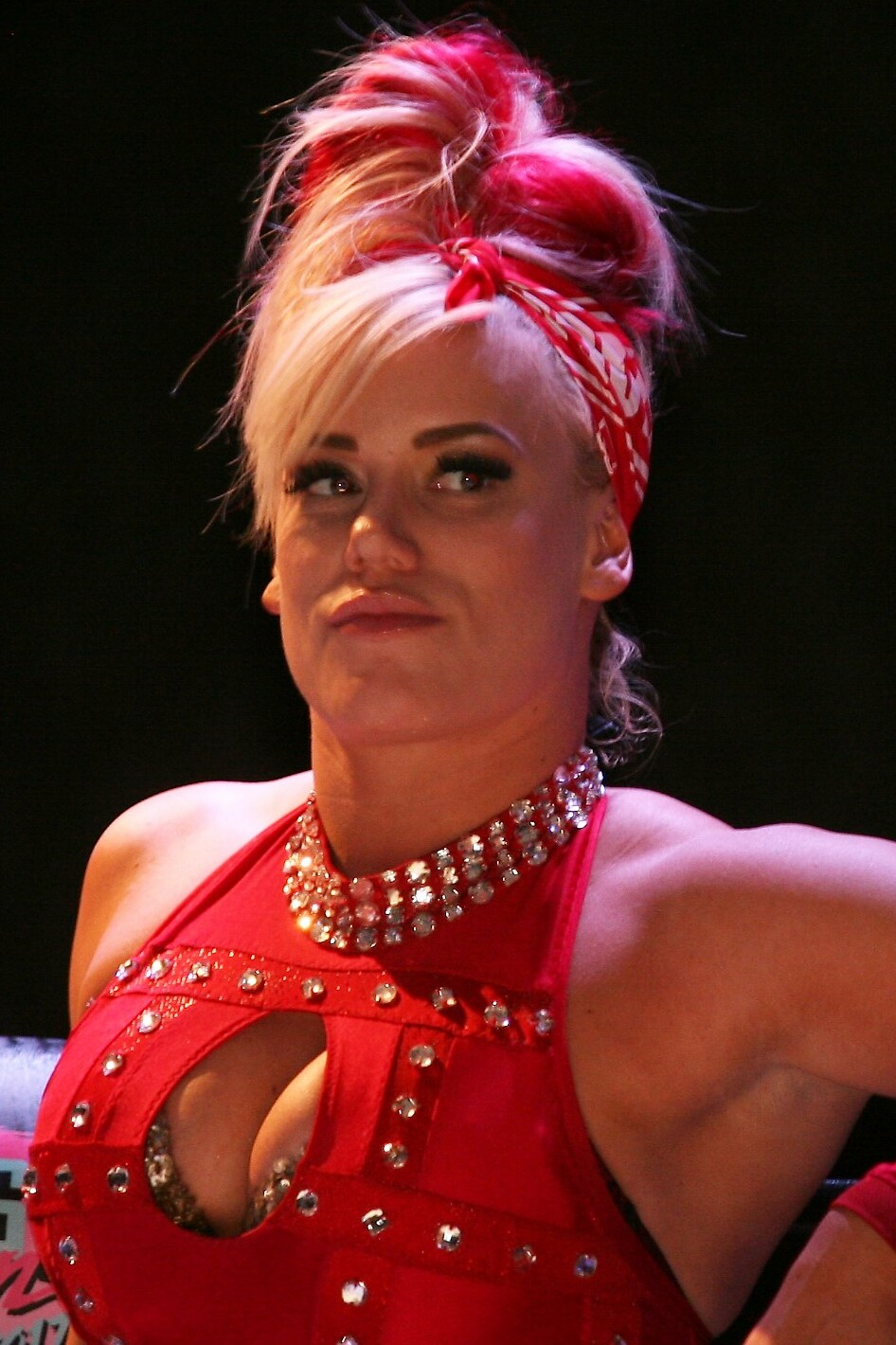
- Valkyrie in April 2016

Personal information
- Born: Kira Renée Magnin-Forster; October 22, 1983 (age 43) Victoria, British Columbia, Canada
- Spouse: John Morrison (m. 2018)
- Website: www.tayavalkyrie.com

Professional wrestling career
- Ring name(s): Franky Monet; Kira Forster; Taya; Taya Mundo; Taya Valkyrie
- Billed height: 1.73 m (5 ft 8 in)
- Billed weight: 185 lb (84 kg)
- Billed from: Slamtown; Victoria, British Columbia
- Trained by: Lance Storm
- Debut: 2010

Kira Renée Magnin-Forster (born October 22, 1983), better known by her ring name Taya Valkyrie, is a Canadian professional wrestler, fitness competitor, and model.

She is best known for her time in All Elite Wrestling (AEW), Impact Wrestling, where she is a former one-time and longest-reigning Impact Knockouts Champion and a two-time Impact Knockouts World Tag Team Champion, Lucha Libre AAA Worldwide (AAA), where she is a record-tying 4-time AAA Reina de Reinas Champion, and in WWE, where she under the ring name Franky Monet.

== Early life ==
Forster is a classically trained ballerina. She had trained in gymnastics and studied dance since age four and went on to study at the Royal Winnipeg Ballet. In 2005 she began competing in fitness competitions and doing fitness modelling, placing 1st in CBBF Canadian Championships 2010, and 2nd in the Arnold Amateur in 2011. She featured in several fitness magazines and calendars over her fitness career.

== Professional wrestling career ==
=== Training and early career (2010–2011) ===
In 2010, Forster began training with Lance Storm at Storm Wrestling Academy and graduated from it in September 2010. She was a part of Lance's Canadian reality series World of Hurt and also season two of the show with Roddy Piper. From there, Forster would then go on to compete at various Canadian promotions under the ring name Taya Valkyrie, most notably Elite Canadian Championship Wrestling (ECCW).

=== Mexican independent circuit (2012) ===
Forster moved to Mexico and began wrestling for various promotions within the country early in her career. She was originally supposed to stay in the country only for six weeks, but was convinced to stay by El Hijo del Perro Aguayo, who offered her a spot in his Los Perros del Mal stable. On April 1, 2012, Forster debuted in Perros del Mal. She wrestled for PDM for most of the year before moving on to work for other promotions including Legend Promociones, Universal Wrestling Entertainment, Invasion RCH and International Wrestling League.

=== Lucha Libre AAA Worldwide (2012–2017) ===
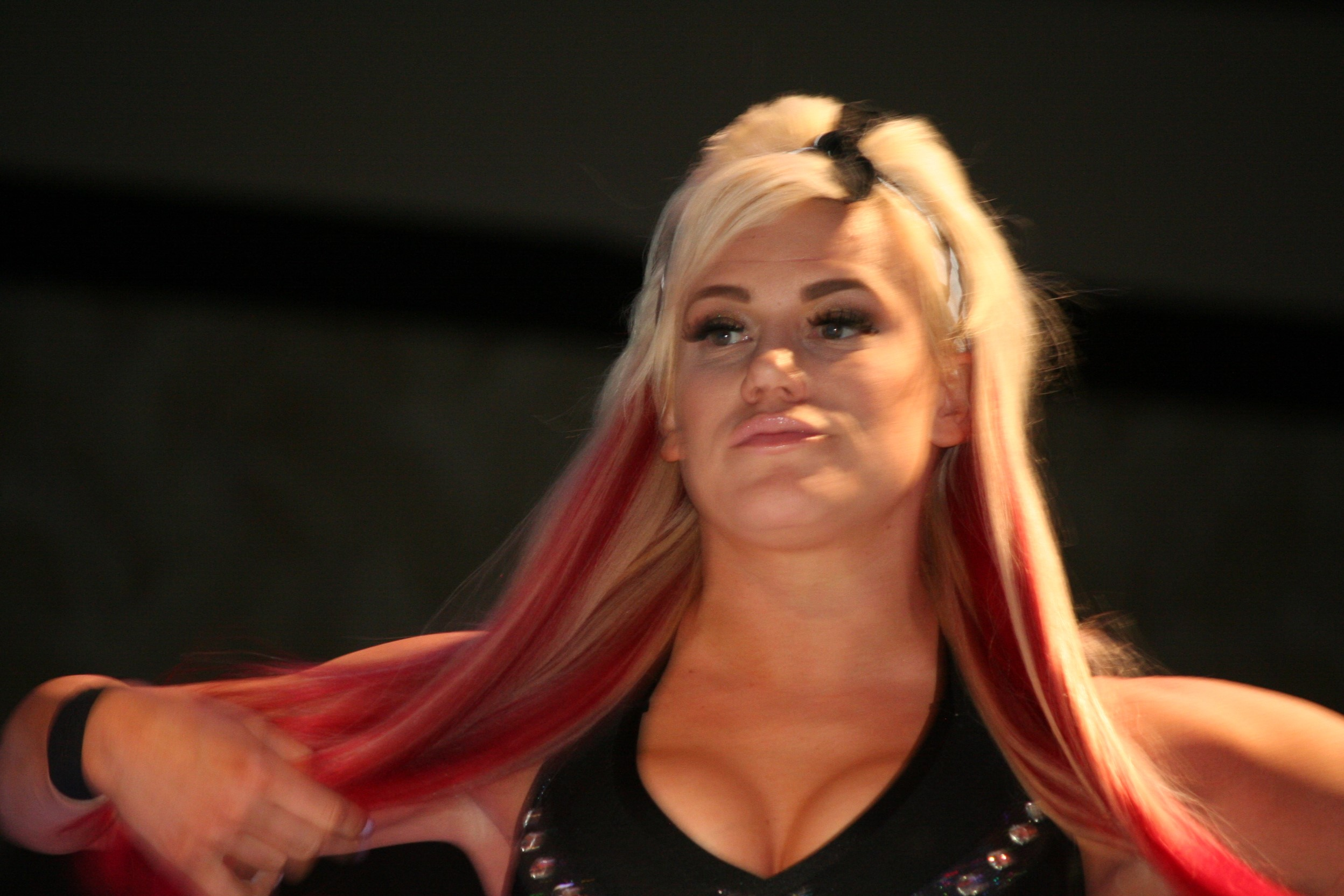
Taya Valkyrie at WrestleConWomens Supershow in 2017.

Forster made her in ring debut for the Mexican promotion Lucha Libre AAA Worldwide under the ring name Taya Valkyrie on November 3, 2012, competing in a six–person mixed tag team match, teaming with Gran Apache and Mari Apache in a winning effort against Cuervo, Faby Apache and Lolita. Throughout 2012 and the beginning of 2013, Valkyrie competed in several tag team matches ending up in both winning and losing sides. On March 3, 2013, Valkyrie defeated Jennifer Blake to advance to the final of a tournament for the vacant AAA Reina de Reinas Championship. Two weeks later, on March 17, at Rey de Reyes, Valkyrie competed in a four-way elimination match against Faby Apache, LuFisto and Mari Apache but was unsuccessful in winning the vacant Reina de Reinas Championship.

On June 4, 2014, Valkyrie defeated Cynthia Moreno, La Jarochita, La Magnifica, Mari Apache, Sexy Lady and Sexy Star in a seven–woman elimination match to become the number one contender to Faby Apache's Reina de Reinas Championship. Two months later, on August 17, at Triplemanía XXII, Valkyrie defeated Faby Apache to win the Reina de Reinas Championship, winning her first championship. On September 12, in her first title defense, at an Independent Total event, Taya defeated Cachorra Flores, Faby Apache, Karina Duval, Muneca Sarcasmo and Princesa Metallica in a six-way elimination match. In her first televised title defense, at the Héroes Inmortales IX event, Forster, now billed as simply Taya, defeated Goya Kong, Lady Shani, La Hiedra and Maravilla (whom she pinned) in a five-way match. She lost the title to Ayako Hamada on March 19, 2017, ending her reign at 945 days, the longest in the title's history (until the record was broken by Lady Flammer in 2026). In a rematch between the two, contested in a no disqualification match, Taya defeated Hamada on April 21 to win the Reina de Reinas Championship for a second time.

On July 1, AAA's Director of Talent Vampiro declared the Reina de Reinas Championship vacant. On July 16, after Sexy Star returned to AAA to win the vacant title, Forster claimed on Twitter that she had been backstabbed by AAA and publicly quit the company. According to the Wrestling Observer, AAA asked Johnny Mundo, Forster's fiancé, to turn in the Reina de Reinas Championship belt for a photo shoot and when he did, they declared the title vacant. Vampiro initially said that Forster was stripped of the title for using an illegal chokehold in her April 21 match with Hamada, despite it being a no disqualification match; he later claimed at a TV taping that Forster had no-showed the event, even though she was never scheduled to appear.

=== Lucha Underground (2016–2018) ===
Taya debuted in Lucha Underground on the February 24, 2016, episode, as the partner of Johnny Mundo. She made her in-ring debut on the March 9 episode, losing to Cage in a no disqualification match. Taya competed in Aztec Warfare II, on the April 12, 2016, Episode, her first Title match at Lucha Underground. She Entered at Number 9, and eliminated Cage, but was later pinned and eliminated by Fénix.

=== Impact Wrestling (2017–2021) ===
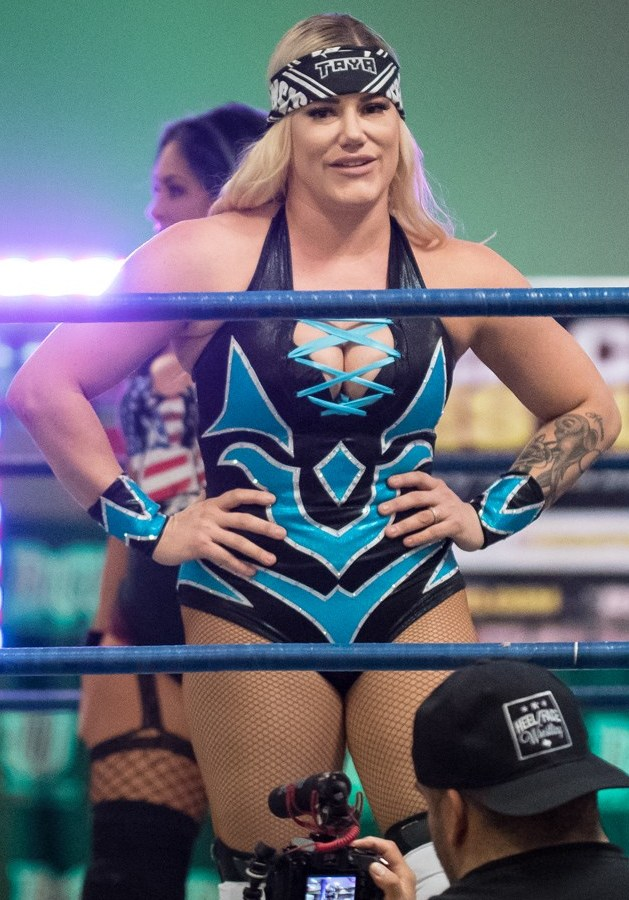
Taya Valkyrie at a wrestling event in 2018.

==== First storylines (2017–2019) ====
On the September 7, 2017, episode of Impact!, Taya Valkyrie made her debut for Impact Wrestling attacking Rosemary, establishing herself as a heel in the process. A week later, Valkyrie competed in her first match where she defeated Amber Nova, after using a new finisher Road to Valhalla. Throughout September and October, Valkyrie continued her rivalry with Rosemary, which eventually led to a match between the two, where Valkyrie was victorious. The two were supposed to face off again, in a first blood match at Bound for Glory, on November 5, but the match was eventually cancelled due to unforeseen personal circumstances regarding Valkyrie. After a five-month absence, Valkyrie made her return on the March 1, 2018, episode of Impact!, where she once again attacked Rosemary and renewed their rivalry. The two competed once again on the April 12 episode of Impact! in a demon's dance match, in which Valkyrie lost to Rosemary, ending their feud.

In late-September after another five-month absence, Valkyrie, now working as a face, made her return as she challenged Tessa Blanchard to a title match for her Impact Knockouts Championship. At Bound for Glory, Blanchard retained the title by using the ring ropes. Three weeks later, Valkyrie received a rematch, which was once again won by Blanchard who attacked the referee and got herself disqualified, retaining the title in the process. The submission victory earned her another title match, which was announced for Homecoming.

==== Longest-reigning Knockouts Champion (2019–2021) ====
At Homecoming, which took place on January 6, 2019, Valkyrie won the Impact Knockouts Championship after the special guest referee Gail Kim (whom Blanchard had attacked during their match) performed her finishing move that allowed Valkyrie to execute her own finishing move before she pinned her. On the March 15 episode of Impact Wrestling, Valkyrie turned heel once again by low blowing Brian Cage, which allowed her real-life husband Johnny Impact (who also turned heel) to attack Cage. On the April 12 episode of Impact Wrestling, Valkyrie and Impact defeated Brian Cage and Jordynne Grace. Valkyrie would then successfully defend the Knockouts Championship against Jordynne Grace at Rebellion, and furthermore against Rosemary, Su Yung and Havok in a Monster's Ball match at Slammiversary XVII and then in against Tenille Dashwood at Bound for Glory.

Following on from her win at Slammiversary, Taya would have one more defence in Mexico which was easily won against a much smaller opponent. This meant Valkyrie would exceed the timeframe in which Tarryn Terrell held the championship and Impact confirmed Valkyrie as the new longest reigning champion. She defended the title against Tenille Dashwood at Bound for Glory 2019 and Jordynne Grace and ODB at Hard to Kill. She would lose the title during Impact Wrestling television tapings in Mexico City against Grace, ending her reign at 377 days. Valkyrie became the second woman to challenge for the Impact World Championship challenging Tessa Blanchard. The two together meant this was the first ever main event featuring two women in a world title match. Blanchard defeated Valkyrie to retain.

On the January 19, 2021, episode of Impact!, the storyline around finding who shot John E. Bravo ended when Valkyrie was revealed as the culprit. This was written to explain Valkyrie's departure from Impact Wrestling.

=== Return to AAA (2018–2021) ===
On October 31, AAA announced the return of Taya as an Impact representative through Facebook Watch called Lucha Capital. On November 14, on her return, Taya was defeated by Australian Suicide in the first round. On December 5, Taya defeated La Hiedra in the semifinal. On December 19, Taya defeated Keyra and Vanilla by winning the Women's Lucha Capital tournament and that same night she got an opportunity for the AAA Reina de Reinas Championship of Lady Shani for a future match.

On September 15, 2019, Valkyrie wrestled in the Impact Wrestling and AAA event Lucha Invades NY, defeating Tessa Blanchard to become AAA Reina de Reinas Champion for the third time. Upon signing with WWE, on February 24, 2021, Valkyrie vacated the Reina de Reinas Championship, ending her reign at 528 days.

=== WWE (2021) ===
On February 14, 2021, it was reported that Forster signed a contract with WWE. Her ringname was changed to Franky Monet and began to work in the NXT television program. She worked with WWE until November, including a title match for the NXT Women's Championship against Raquel Gonzalez, but she was released on November 4 as part of a seventh round of layoffs, due to the COVID-19 pandemic.

=== Second return to AAA (2021–2023) ===
On December 4 at Triplemanía Regia II, Valkyrie made her return to AAA and challenged Deonna Purrazzo for the AAA Reina de Reinas Championship. On October 15, at Triplemanía XXX, Valkyrie successfully defended her title against the NWA World Women's Champion Kamille, after Valkyrie did not succeed at defeating Kamille On NWA 74 for the NWA World Women's Title.

On August 12, 2023, at Triplemanía XXXI: Mexico City, Valkyrie who was in her fourth reign of the Reina de Reinas Championship, lost the title to Flammer in a no disqualification match, ending her reign at 476 days.

=== Return to Impact Wrestling (2022–2023) ===
On April 1, 2022, at Multiverse of Matches, Valkyrie made her return to Impact Wrestling and challenged Purrazzo for the AAA Reina de Reinas Championship at Rebellion. At Rebellion, Valkyrie defeated Purrazzo to win the title for record fourth time in her career. On May 7, at Under Siege, she successfully defended the title against Purrazzo in a rematch. On June 19, at Slammiversary, Valkyrie teamed with Rosemary to defeat The Influence (Madison Rayne and Tenille Dashwood) to win the Impact Knockouts World Tag Team Championship for the first time in her career. On July 1, at Against All Odds, they would retain their titles against the Influence (Gisele Shaw and Tenille Dashwood). On July 14, they would bring back Havok from the Undead Realm, as she would assume the identity of Jessicka and they would form a team called The Death Dollz. On August 12, at Emergence, they would lose their titles to VXT (Chelsea Green and Deonna Purrazzo).On October 7, at Bound for Glory, Valkyrie would team up with Jessicka to beat VXT and win her second Knockouts World Tag Team Championship. Rosemary would also be recognized as champion under the Freebird Rule. On November 18, at Over Drive, they would retain their titles against Savannah Evans and Tasha Steelz.

On March 11, 2023, it was reported that Valkyrie is officially done with Impact Wrestling. On the March 16 episode of Impact!, The Death Dollz lost the Knockouts World Tag Team Championship to The Coven (Taylor Wilde and KiLynn King).

=== Major League Wrestling (2022–2023) ===
On April 21, 2022, MLW announced that the MLW Women's Featherweight Championship would be decided at Kings of Colosseum, when dominant force Holidead faces the returning Taya Valkyrie. At the event, Valkyrie won the title. During her reign, Valkyrie successfully defended her title against various contenders, such as Brittany Blake, Lady Flammer, Trish Adora, Zoey Skye and Billie Starkz. On April 6, 2023, at War Chamber, Valkyrie lost the Women's Featherweight Championship to Delmi Exo.

=== National Wrestling Alliance (2022–2023) ===
On June 11, 2022, Valkyrie made her debut at National Wrestling Alliance (NWA) at the Alwayz Ready event, where she unsuccessfully challenged Natalia Markova after being distracted by Taryn Terrell, who accompanied Markova to the match. This led to a match between Terrell and Valkyrie on the June 14 episode of Powerrr, which Valkyrie was victorious. On the July 26 special episode of EmPowerrr, Valkyrie defeated KiLynn King to become the number one contender for the NWA World Women's Championship, which was held by Kamille. On August 27, Valkyire challenged Kamille for the title during the main event of the first night of NWA 74th Anniversary Show, however, was unsuccessful. On the September 6 edition of Powerrr, Valkyrie defeated Chelsea Green, Jennacide and King to become the number one contender again for Kamille's title, setting up a rematch between the two at Hard Times 3. However, Bully Ray argued that King, his former trainee, deserved the title shot, so a match between Valkyrie and King was set for the October 11 Powerrr. There, King defeated Valkyrie for the right to challenge Kamille at Hard Times 3.

=== All Elite Wrestling / Ring of Honor (2023–2026) ===
Valkyrie debuted in All Elite Wrestling (AEW) on the March 15, 2023, episode of Dynamite and confronted AEW TBS Champion Jade Cargill. Valkyrie had her first match in AEW on the March 17 episode of Rampage, where she defeated Ava Lawless. On the April 26 episode of Dynamite, Valkyrie was unsuccessful at winning the TBS Championship against Jade Cargill. At Double or Nothing on May 28, Valkyrie again lost to Cargill in an TBS Championship match. On June 21 episode of Dynamite, Valkyrie unsuccessfully challenged Kris Statlander for the TBS Championship. On July 15 at Battle of the Belts VII, Valkyrie unsuccessfully challenged Toni Storm for the AEW Women's World Championship. On December 12 on ROH on HonorClub, Valkyrie made her Ring of Honor (ROH) debut, in a winning effort against Rachel Ellering.

On February 10, 2024's tapings of Ring of Honor, Valkyrie entered the inaugural ROH Women's World Television Championship tournament where she defeated Sussy Love in the first round. On the February 24 tapings of ROH, Taya Valkyrie faced Queen Aminata in the second round of the tournament but was unsuccessful. In late 2024, Valkyrie formed an alliance with Deonna Purrazzo, later known as "The Vendetta". In August 2025, Valkyrie joined her real-life husband Johnny TV and MxM Collection (Mansoor and Mason Madden) to form MxM TV.

On November 4, 2026, Valkyrie announced that her AEW contract had expired and elected not to renew, ending her three-year tenure with the promotion.

=== Consejo Mundial de Lucha Libre (2025) ===
On February 19, 2025, it was announced that Taya will debut and replace Red Velvet due to her injury and will team up with Lady Frost on March 7 in a tournament for the vacant CMLL World Women's Tag Team Championship. Taya and Frost defeated Hera and Olympia in the first tournament round and in the second round they defeated Skadi and Kira to become one of the finalists of the tournament. Taya and Frost defeated Zeuxis and India Sioux in the Arena Coliseo. On March 21, 2025 in Homenaje a Dos Leyendas they were defeated by La Jarochita and Lluvia for the vacant CMLL World Women's Tag Team Championship.

== Other media ==
In the fall of 2019, Forster shot the role of Regina in the action film Unchained, released on Amazon Prime in July 2021. In February 2020, Forster was cast in and shot scenes for the ultimately-abandoned fourth season of the Netflix dramedy GLOW; her involvement was only revealed upon the news of the cancellation in October.

She was one of the Traitors in the fourth season of The Traitors Canada in September 2026.

== Personal life ==
On June 1, 2018, Forster married fellow wrestler John Hennigan, better known by the ring name John Morrison, with whom she had been in a relationship for nearly two years. The pair met through the affiliation between AAA and Lucha Underground, with Forster becoming Hennigan's on-screen partner in the latter promotion prior to their real-life relationship.

== Championships and accomplishments ==
Taya Valkyrie is 4-time & the most combined day holder at 2,020 days of the AAA Reina de Reinas Championship.

- Canadian Pro-Wrestling Hall of Fame
  - Class of 2024
- DDT Pro-Wrestling
  - Ironman Heavymetalweight Championship (1 time)
- Future Stars of Wrestling
  - FSW Women's Championship (1 time)
- Heavy on Wrestling
  - Heavy on Wrestling Women's Championship (1 time)
- Impact Wrestling
  - Impact Knockouts Championship (1 time)
  - Impact Knockouts World Tag Team Championship (2 times) – with Rosemary (1), Jessicka and Rosemary (1)
  - Impact Year End Awards (2 times)
    - Knockout of the Year (2019)
    - Knockouts Tag Team of the Year (2022) with Jessicka and Rosemary
- Ironfist Wrestling
  - Ironfist Women's Championship (1 time)
- Lucha Libre AAA Worldwide
  - AAA Reina de Reinas Championship (4 times)
  - Women's Lucha Capital (2018)
  - Luchadora of the Year (2014, 2015)
- Major League Wrestling
  - MLW World Women's Featherweight Championship (1 time, inaugural)
- National Wrestling Alliance
  - NWA Champions Series Tournament (2023) – with Ricky Morton, Kerry Morton, Chris Adonis, Madi Wrenkowski, Jennacide, Mims, Dak Draper and Alex Taylor Willoughby
- Pro Wrestling Illustrated
  - Comeback of the Year (2022)
  - Ranked No. 10 of the top 150 female wrestlers in the PWI Women's 150 in 2022
- Sports Illustrated
  - Ranked No. 5 of the top 10 women's wrestlers in 2019
- Xtreme Pro Wrestling
  - XPW Women's Championship (1 time)
  - XPW Women's Championship Tournament (2022)
- World Series Wrestling
  - WSW Women's Championship (1 time)
