= Australian Suicide (wrestler) =

Australian professional wrestler (1992–2025)

Personal information
- Born: Broderick Shepherd; 9 December 1992 Melbourne, Victoria, Australia
- Died: 6 March 2025 (aged 32) Chimalhuacán, State of México, Mexico
- Cause of death: Cardiac arrest
- Spouse: Jenyvalice Vargas (m. 2021)

Professional wrestling career
- Ring name(s): Australian Suicide; El Australiano; Hexagon Dark; Ryan Rollins
- Billed height: 1.65 m (5 ft 5 in)
- Billed weight: 70 kg (150 lb)
- Billed from: Mexico City, Mexico
- Trained by: Carlo Cannon; Gran Apache; Lance Storm
- Debut: 2005

Broderick Shepherd (9 December 1992 – 6 March 2025) was an Australian professional wrestler, best known by the ring name Australian Suicide, who worked for Lucha Libre AAA Worldwide (AAA), where he was an AAA World Cruiserweight Champion. Before arriving in Mexico, Shepherd competed in other independent companies in both Australia and the United States under the name Ryan Rollins.

== Professional wrestling career ==
=== Independent circuit (2005–2013) ===
Shepherd began fighting in various promotions under the name of Ryan Rollins during his early years in both Australia and other companies such as National Wrestling Alliance (NWA), Melbourne City Wrestling, Slam Factory Wrestling and among other promotions.

In 2012, he was trained by Lance Storm while competing in Canada before he arrived on Lucha Libre AAA Worldwide in Mexico in 2013.

=== Lucha Libre AAA Worldwide (2013–2020) ===
On 22 September 2013, Rollins debuted in Lucha Libre AAA Worldwide (AAA) as the luchador enmascarado (masked wrestler) as Australian Suicide teaming up with Angélico and Jack Evans defeating Eterno, Pentagon Jr. and Steve Pain. On 16 March 2014, at Rey de Reyes, Suicide competed for AAA Cruiserweight Championship where he lost to Daga in a four-way elimination match who was involved with Argenis and Super Fly. At Triplemanía XXII, Suicide was part of a ten-way elimination match to unify the AAA Fusión and AAA Cruiserweight Championships. At the end of 2015, Suicide had a feud against Daga during all AAA events, including in Triplemanía XXIV where Suicide won the Copa Triplemania against his rival and being attacked by the Daga himself after finishing the match. On October 3 at Héroes Inmortales X, Suicide was defeated by Daga in a Lucha de Apuestas, hair vs mask match, where he was forced to take off his mask and reveal his name, Broderick Shepherd from Melbourne, Australia. During the period of time after losing his mask, Suicide began to modify his character as a gang. On 4 June 2017 at Verano de Escándalo, Suicide teamed up with Bengala for the AAA World Tag Team Championship where La Secta (Cuervo and Scoria) was crowned. On 26 January 2018 at Guerra de Titanes, Suicide won the AAA World Cruiserweight Championship defeating Lanzeloth for the first time in his career. At Triplemanía XXVI pre-show, Suicide lost his title to Sammy Guevara in a four-way match, and which also involved A. C. H. and Shane Strickland.

On 3 August at Triplemanía XXVII, Suicide teamed up with Vanilla Vargas for the AAA World Mixed Tag Team Championship against Sammy Guevara and Scarlett Bordeaux, Niño Hamburguesa and Big Mami and Lady Maravilla and Villano III Jr., where Maravilla and Villano were crowned as new champions.

=== All Elite Wrestling (2021) ===
On 12 January 2021, Suicide made his debut in the American wrestling promotion All Elite Wrestling appearing on Dark as El Australiano, teaming with KC Navarro, losing against The Dark Order (Alex Reynolds and John Silver).

== Personal life and death ==
Shepherd was married to fellow professional wrestler Vanilla Vargas. On 7 July 2020, Vargas announced on her Twitter that they were expecting their first child together. The couple also left Mexico to live in Puerto Rico before returning to Mexico in 2024.

Shepherd died of cardiac arrest on 6 March 2025, at the age of 32. In the weeks leading up to his death, Shepherd had fallen on a staircase and received a blow to the head; he did not seek medical attention. On 5 March, while visiting a market close to Mexico City with his family, he fainted, again hitting his head. He was taken to a hospital in Chimalhuacán, but died shortly after midnight.

== Championships and accomplishments ==
- Rampage Wrestling Association
  - RWA No Limits Championship (1 time, final)
- WRESTLING GO!
  - WRESTLING GO! 24/7 Watermelon Championship (1 time)
- Lucha Libre Extrema
  - LLE Championship (1 time, inaugural)
  - LLE Championship Tournament (2023)
- Champion Wrestling Association
  - CWA Tag Team Championship (1 time) – with Jeremiah Saint
- Lucha Libre AAA Worldwide
  - AAA World Cruiserweight Championship (1 time)
  - Copa Triplemanía XXIV (2016)

== Luchas de Apuestas record ==
Winner (wager)	Loser (wager)	Location	Event	Date	Notes
Daga (hair)	Australian Suicide (mask)	Monterrey, Nuevo León	Héroes Inmortales X	2 October 2016	
