= List of Lucha Libre AAA Worldwide personnel =

Personnel of Lucha Libre AAA Worldwide

This is a list of Lucha Libre AAA Worldwide (AAA) personnel, detailing all personnel within AAA, a professional wrestling promotion owned by American company WWE and Mexican company Fillip. The alias ("ring name") of the employee is written on the left, while the employee's real name is on the right. If an employee is inactive for any reason (due to injury, suspension, or any other reason), that information is noted. AAA personnel consists of professional wrestlers, play-by-play and color commentators, ring announcers, interviewers, referees, producers, creative writers, and various other positions. AAA wrestlers and personnel primarily appear on the weekly Lucha Libre AAA on Fox television program, on AAA's WWE Ahora supplementary video podcast, on the promotion's major events, and on untelevised house shows.

As AAA is the sister promotion of WWE, wrestlers from that promotion, in particular from their NXT and Evolve developmental brands, as well as wrestlers from AAA's international and domestic partners The Crash Lucha Libre (The Crash), Total Nonstop Action Wrestling (TNA), and Gleat may also make periodic appearances at AAA events and on AAA programming.

== Personnel ==
=== Male wrestlers ===
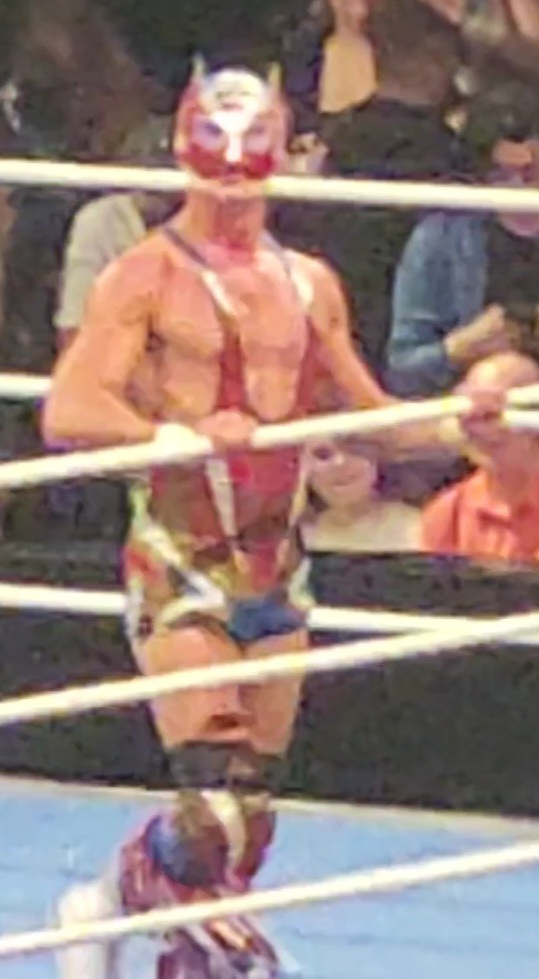
El Grande Americano

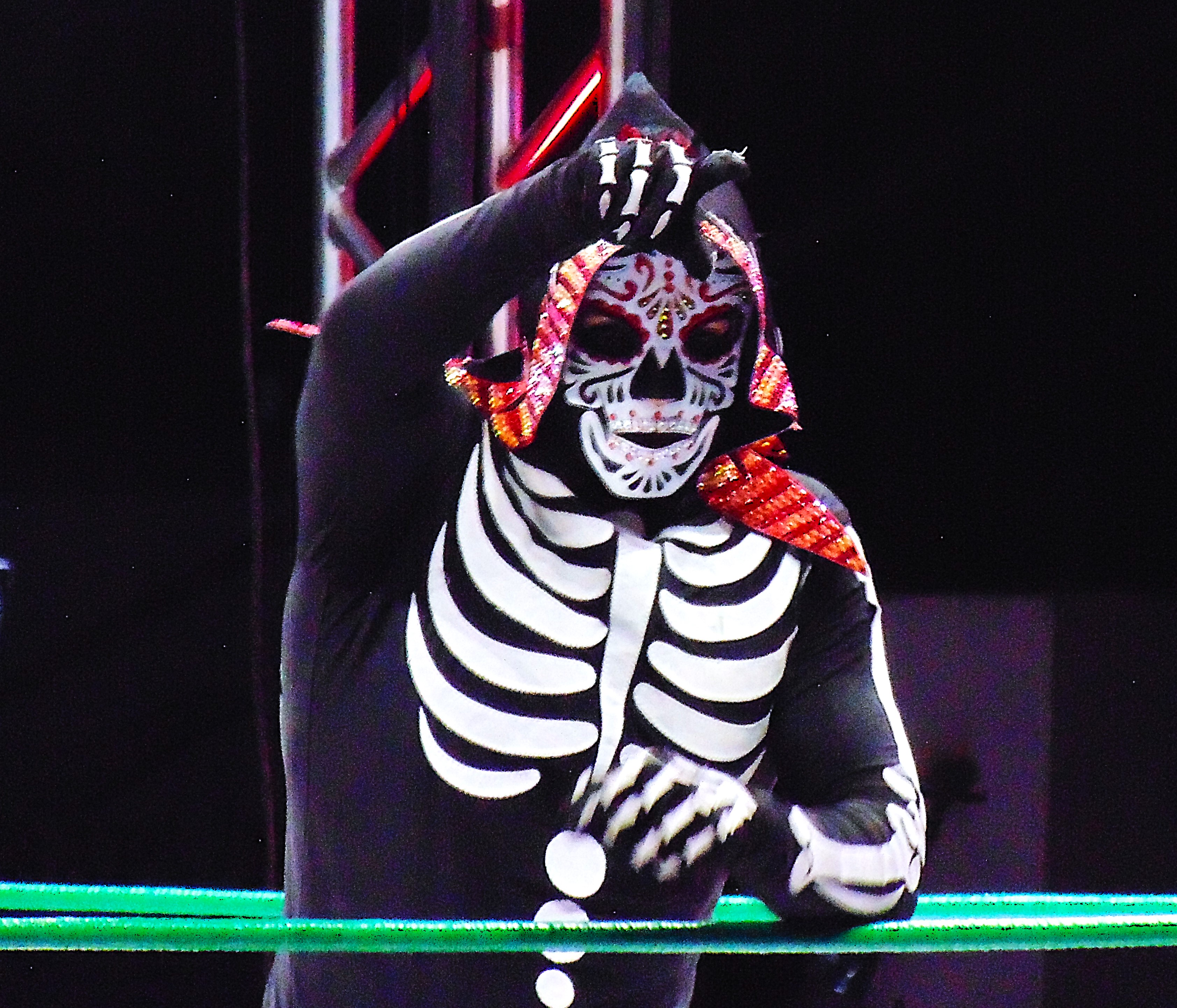
La Parka

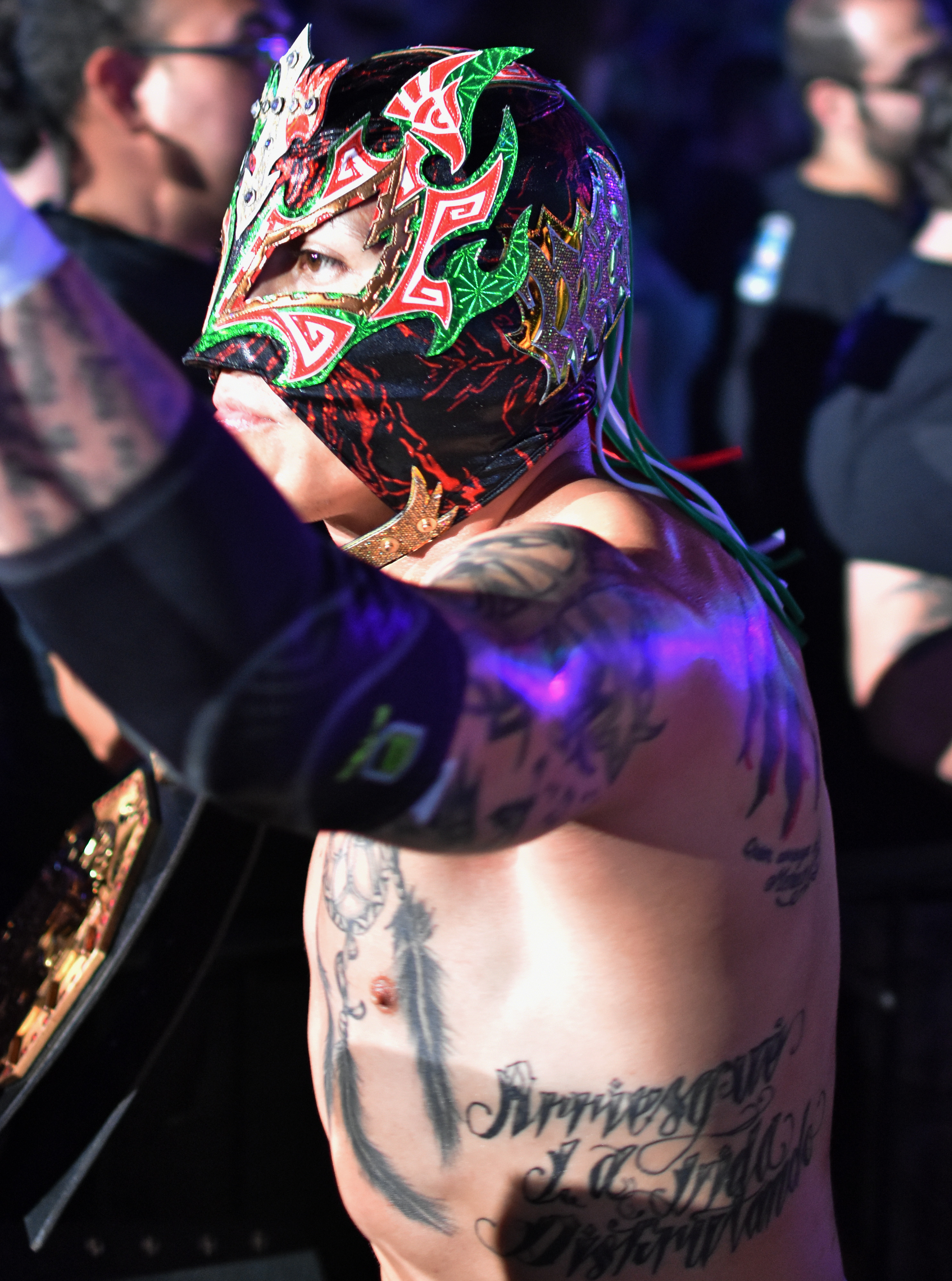
Rey Fénix

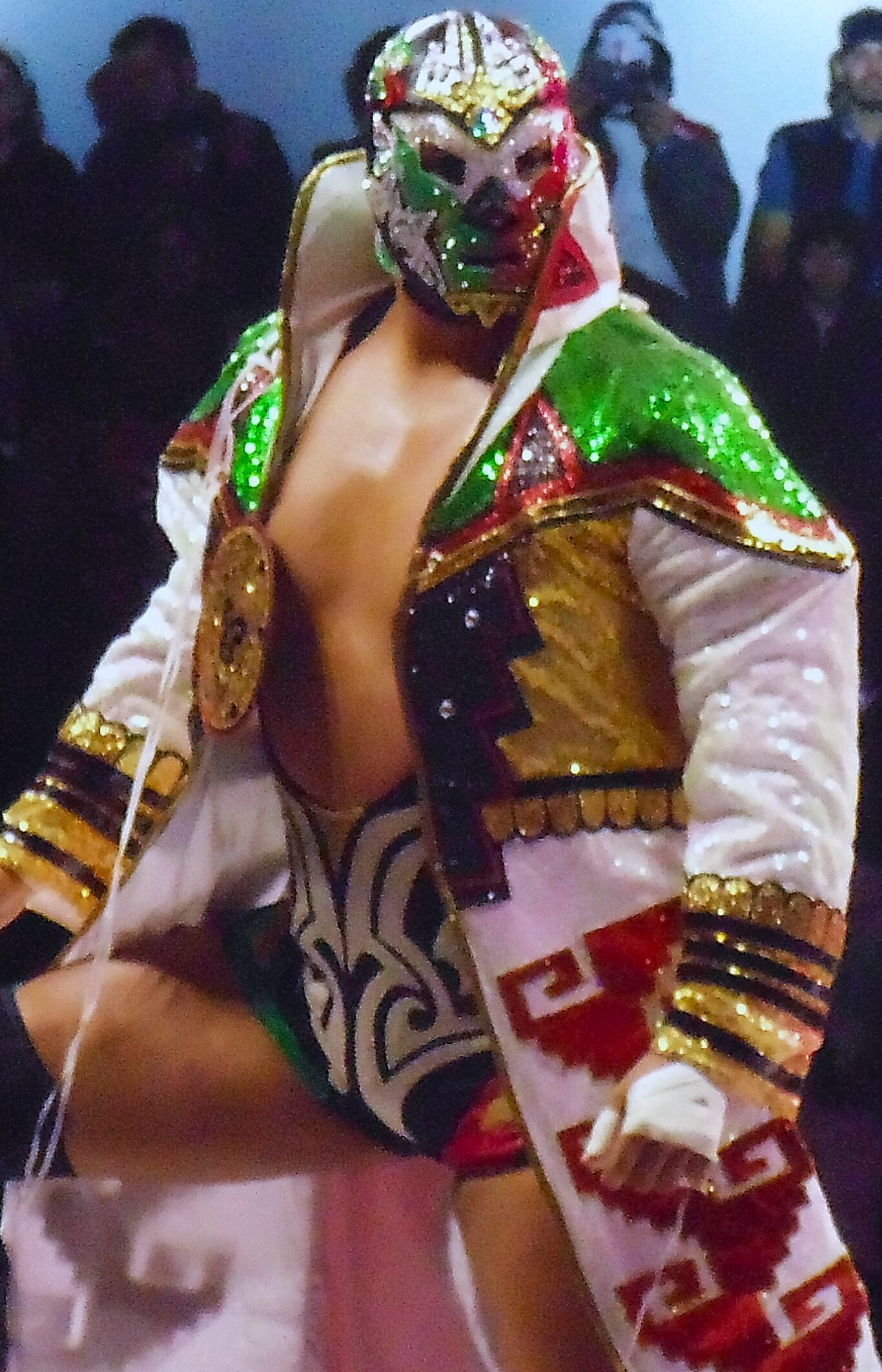
El Hijo de Dr. Wagner Jr.

Galeno

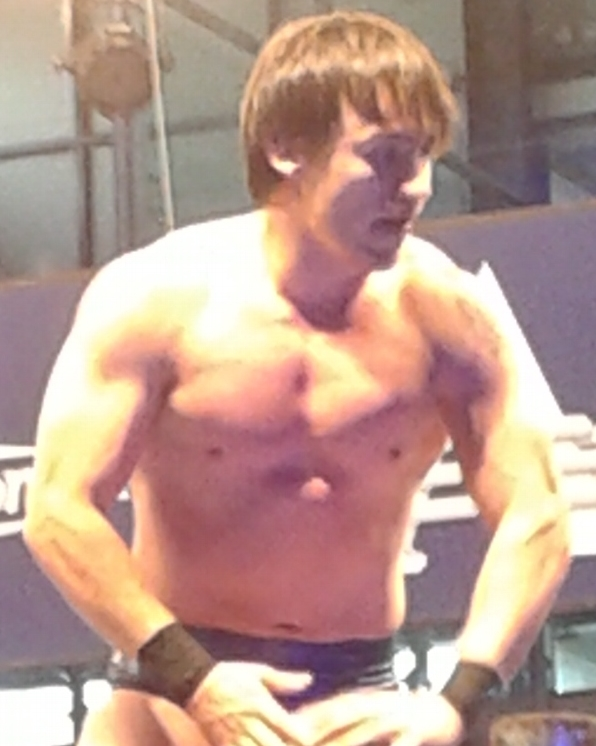
Daga

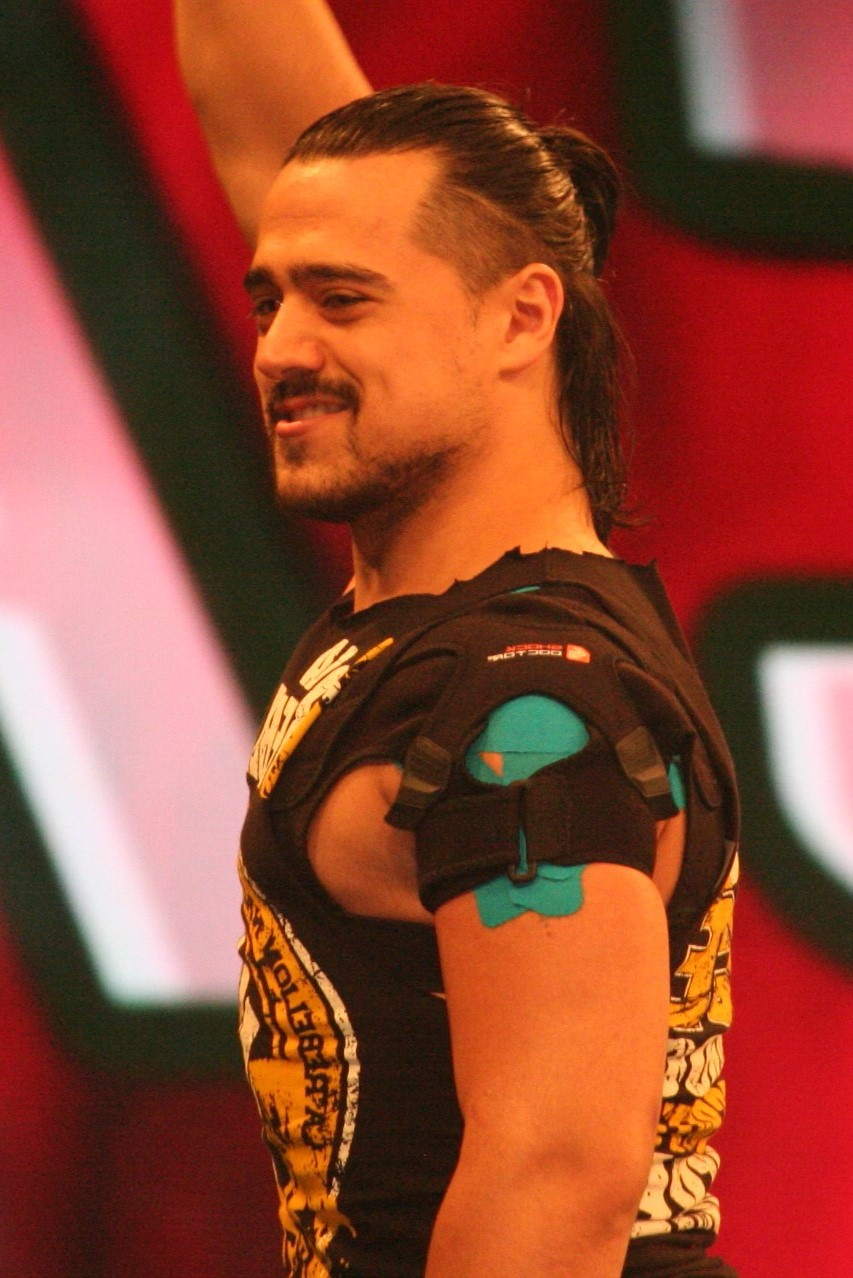
Angel

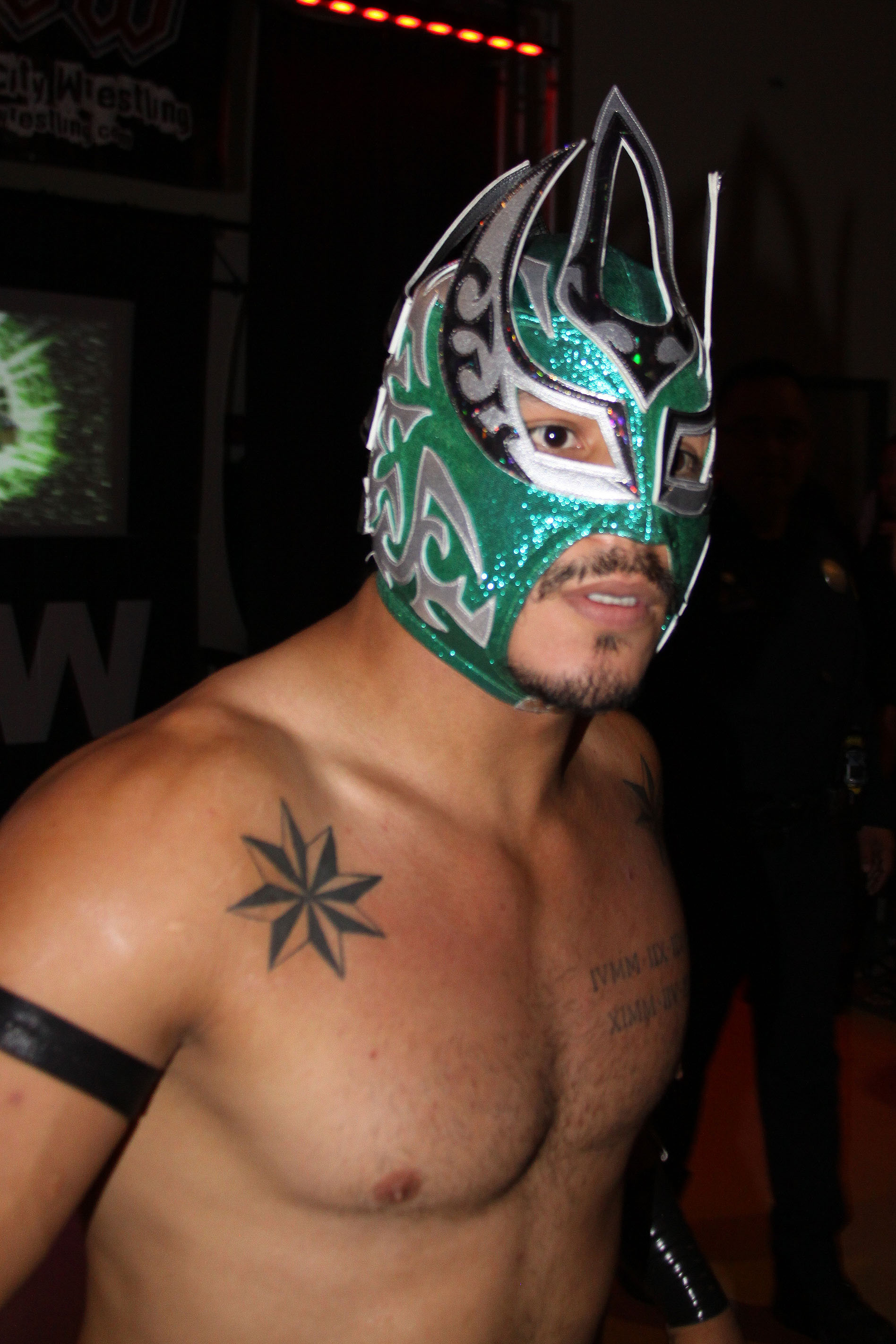
Laredo Kid

Ring name	Real name	Notes
Abismo Negro Jr.	Miguel Ángel Lugo	
Aero Star	Undisclosed (Note: Per longstanding tradition, the identities of masked lucha libre wrestlers is kept secret from the general public. It is considered taboo for wrestlers, news media, or fans to report or speculate on the identities of masked lucha libre wrestlers.)	
Angel	Humberto Garza Solano	World Trios Champion; Signed to WWE
Belcegor	Undisclosed	
Berto	Humberto Garza Carrillo	World Trios Champion; Signed to WWE
Black Andromeda	Undisclosed	Exótico
Bravo Americano	Tyler Bate	Signed to WWE
Chris Carter	Christian John	
Colmillo de Plata	Undisclosed	
Cruz Del Toro	Raúl Mendoza	Signed to WWE
Daga	Miguel Ángel Olivo Castro	World Trios Champion
Dave the Clown	Undisclosed	
Demonio Infernal	José Antonio Rojas	
Dinámico	Alberto Espinoza	
Dominik Mysterio	Dominik Óscar Gutiérrez	Signed to WWE
Drago	Undisclosed	
Dragon Lee	Emmanuel Muñoz González	Signed to WWE
El Carnicero	Beau Morris	Also appears in WWE as Drake Morreaux; Signed to WWE
El Fiscal	Undisclosed	
El Grande Americano	Marcel Barthel	Mega Champion; Signed to WWE
El Hijo de Dr. Wagner Jr.	Undisclosed	World Tag Team Champion
El Hijo del Vikingo	Emmanuel Morales	Inactive; knee injury
El Mesías	Gilbert Cosme	
Elijah Holyfield	Elijah Holyfield	Signed to WWE
Elio LeFleur	Cyril Coquerelle	Signed to WWE
Epydemius Jr.	Undisclosed	
Erik	Raymond Rowe	Signed to WWE
Forastero	Undisclosed	
Galeno	Undisclosed	World Tag Team Champion
Garra de Oro	Undisclosed	Inactive; undisclosed injury
Histeria	Undisclosed	
Ivar	Todd Smith	Signed to WWE
Jack Cartwheel	Jack Summit	
Joaquin Wilde	Michael Paris	Signed to WWE
Kento	Kento Kobune	Signed to Gleat
La Parka	Undisclosed	Latin American Champion
Laredo Kid	Undisclosed	
Lince Dorado	José Cordero	Producer; Signed to WWE
Mecha Wolf	John Jesús Yurnet	
Mr. Iguana	Santiago Ibarra Calderón	
Murder Clown	Undisclosed	
Myzteziz Jr.	Carlos Leonel Ramírez Carmona	Inactive; leg injury
Negro Casas	José Casas Ruiz	
Niño Hamburguesa	Ivan Flores	World Mixed Tag Team Champion
Nobu	Nobuhiro Shimatani	
Noisy Boy	Undisclosed	
Octagón Jr.	Undisclosed	Inactive; neck injury
Omos	Tolulope Omogbehin	Signed to WWE
Pagano	José Pacheco Hernández	
Panic Clown	Undisclosed	
Penta	Undisclosed	Money in the Bank contract holder Signed to WWE
Pimpinela Escarlata	Mario González Lozano	Exótico
Psycho Clown	Undisclosed	
Rayo Americano	Peter England	Producer; Signed to WWE
Rey Fénix	Undisclosed	World Cruiserweight Champion; Signed to WWE
Rey Mysterio	Óscar Gutiérrez Rubio	English-language commentator Interpreter/translator; Hall of Famer; WWE Hall of Famer; Signed to WWE
Sansón	Undisclosed	
Spider Fly	Undisclosed	Inactive; leg injury
Takuma	Takuma Fujiwara	Signed to Gleat
Taurus	Undisclosed	
Texano Jr.	Juan Aguilar Leos	

=== Female wrestlers ===
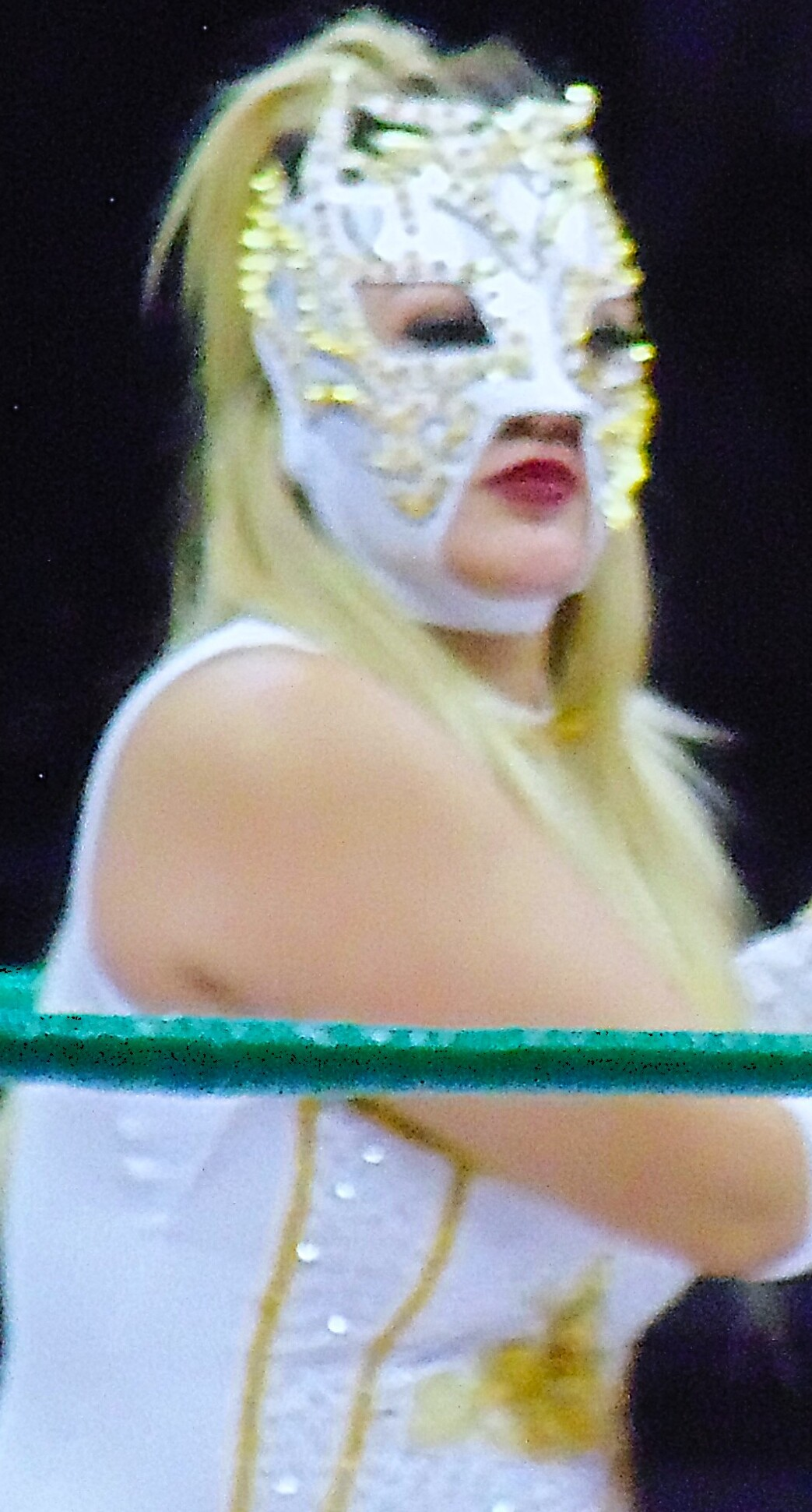
La Hiedra

Ring name	Real name	Notes
Adelicious	Undisclosed	
Big Mami	Alejandra Montes Luna	World Mixed Tag Team Champion
Dalys	Undisclosed	
Faby Apache	Fabiola Balbuena Torres	
Flammer	Undisclosed	
Jessy Jackson	Undisclosed	
Karmen Petrovic	Monika Klisara	Signed to WWE
La Catalina	Catalina Aurora García Corrial	Reina de Reinas Champion
La Hiedra	Undisclosed	
Lady Shani	Undisclosed	
Maravilla	Undisclosed	Inactive; knee injury
Sussy Love	Azucena Bautista Armas	

=== Mini-Estrella wrestlers ===
Ring name	Real name	Notes
Drago Kid	Undisclosed	
La Parkita	Undisclosed	
Mascarita Sagrada	Undisclosed	Also appears in WWE as Minihausen
Micro Man	Undisclosed	
Mini Abismo Negro	José Luis Florencio Ramos	
Mini Psycho Clown	Undisclosed	
Mini Vikingo	Undisclosed	Inactive; elbow injury

=== Other on-air personnel ===
Ring name	Real name	Notes
Damián 666	Leonardo Carrera Gómez	Manager of Los Perros del Mal
Dorian Roldán	Dorian Joaquín Roldán Peña	Manager of El Ojo; Interim General Manager; CEO and Director of Operations; Creative writer

== Referees ==
Ring name	Real name	Notes
Adrian Butler	Darryl Sharma	NXT senior referee Producer
Eddie Orengo	Eddie Orengo	
El Hijo del Tirantes	Fernando Landa Bautista	
El Piero	Undisclosed	
Felix Fernandez	Sammy Carrion	
Suavecito	Rodrigo Granados	

== Broadcast team ==
Ring name	Real name	Notes
Andrea Bazarte	Andrea Paola Martínez Bazarte	Interviewer; Host of WWE Ahora; WWE Español Digital Host
Eduardo Bates	Eduardo Bates	Host of WWE Ahora
Jesús Zuñiga	Jesús Zuñiga	Ring announcer
José Manuel Guillén	José Manuel Guillén	Play-by-play commentator
Roberto Figueroa	Roberto de Jesús Figueroa Salazar	Color commentator
Vero Rodríguez	Verónica Rodríguez Cuesta	Interviewer

=== Foreign language ===
Ring name	Real name	Notes
Chuey Martinez	Chuey Martinez	English-language interviewer
Corey Graves	Matthew Polinsky	English-language commentator
John "Bradshaw" Layfield	John Charles Layfield	English-language commentator WWE Hall of Famer
Lilian Garcia	Lilián Garcia	English-language ring announcer

== Creative team and producers ==
Ring name	Real name	Role
Chavo Guerrero	Salvador Guerrero IV	Producer
Jeremy Borash	Jeremy Borash	Creative writer Director of WWE Latin America; Vice President of Content and Development of WWE
Konnan	Charles Ashenoff	Creative writer Occasional English-language commentator Hall of Famer; Inactive; diabetes complications
Matt Bloom	Matthew Bloom	Producer
"Moody" Jack Meléndez	Héctor Meléndez	Creative writer Producer
Norman Smiley	Norman Smiley	Producer
Ricky Marvin	Ricardo Fuentes Romero	Producer; Trainer
Savio Vega	Juan Rivera	Producer; Occasional English-language commentator
The Undertaker	Mark Calaway	Head of Creative; Executive Producer; WWE Hall of Famer

== Corporate staff ==
Ring name	Real name	Role
Alberto Fasja	Alberto Fasja Cohen	Executive Chairman of Fillip
Bárbara González Briseño	Bárbara González Briseño	CEO of Fillip
Claudia González	Claudia González	Director of Post Production
Jorge Flores	Jorge Flores	Director of New Projects
Lee Fitting	Lee Fitting	Executive Producer; Head of Media and Production of WWE
Marisela Peña	Marisela Peña Roldán	President; AAA Hall of Famer
Nick Khan	Nicholas Khan	President of WWE; TKO Group Holdings board member
Óscar Manuel	Óscar Manuel Diaz Quintanar	Digital Director
Sara Robledo García	Sara Robledo García	WWE Latin America Senior Digital and Social Manager
Triple H	Paul Levesque	Executive Producer; Chief Content Officer of WWE; WWE Hall of Famer

== See also ==
- Professional wrestling in Mexico
- List of WWE personnel
- List of professional wrestling rosters
