= AAA Noche de Campeones =

2022 Lucha Libre AAA Worldwide show

Noche de Campeones
- Promotional poster for the Monterrey event featuring various AAA luchadores and luchadoras
- Promotion: Lucha Libre AAA Worldwide
- Date: December 28, 2022
- City: Acapulco, Guerrero, Mexico
- Venue: Arena GNP Seguros
- Tagline(s): Lucha Libre AAA Worldwide Gira Aniversario XXX Cierre de la Gira (Spanish for: Lucha Libre AAA Worldwide 30th Anniversary Tour Close)

Pay-per-view chronology
← Previous; Super Series	Next → Rey de Reyes

Noche de Campeones (Spanish for "Night of Champions") was a professional wrestling pay-per-view (PPV) event that was scripted and produced by the Mexican Lucha Libre AAA Worldwide (AAA) promotion on December 28, 2022, in Acapulco, Guerrero, Mexico at Arena GNP Seguros.

The event was themed around championship matches, with all but one of the matches being contested for a championship. In the main event match, Hijo del Vikingo defeated Bandido to retain the AAA Mega Championship. In other prominent matches, Arez defeated Taurus and Villano III Jr. in a three-way match to win the inaugural La Leyenda Azul Blue Demon Championship, Abismo Negro Jr. and Flammer defeated Komander and Sexy Star II and Octagón Jr. and Lady Shani in a three-way mixed tag team match to win the vacant AAA World Mixed Tag Team Championship, and Los Hermanos Lee (Dragon Lee and Dralístico) defeated FTR (Dax Harwood and Cash Wheeler) to win the AAA World Tag Team Championship, immediately after the match Los Hermanos Lee vacated the championship and Dragon Lee announced he had signed with WWE.

== Production ==
=== Background ===
Noche de Campeones is themed around championship matches, with all but one of the announced matches on the card being contested for a championship.

The event aired on pay-per-view via the FITE TV service.

=== Storylines ===
Noche de Campeones featured seven professional wrestling matches that involved different wrestlers from pre-existing scripted feuds, plots and storylines. Wrestlers portrayed either heels (referred to as rudos in Mexico, those that portray the "bad guys") or faces (técnicos in Mexico, the "good guy" characters) as they followed a series of tension-building events, which culminated in wrestling matches.

== Matches ==
No.	Results	Stipulations	Times
1^{D}	Aracno defeated Engañoso, Gran Mazo, El Leyenda Americana, Picadura Letal, and Terror Púrpura	Tournament final for the inaugural Marvel Lucha Libre Championship	—
2	Nueva Generación Dinamita (El Cuatrero, Sansón, and Forastero) (c) defeated Willie Mack and Jinetes del Aire (Aramís and Myzteziz Jr.)	Trios match for the AAA World Trios Championship	11:27
3	Abismo Negro Jr. and Flammer defeated Komander and Sexy Star II and Octagón Jr. and Lady Shani	Three-way mixed tag team match for the vacant AAA World Mixed Tag Team Championship	13:40
4	Pagano defeated Vampiro, Aero Star, Blue Demon Jr., Niño Hamburguesa, Mr. Iguana, La Diva Salvaje, Jessy, Murder Clown, Dave The Clown, Panic Clown, and La Parka Negra	12-man Copa Mundo Imperial match	17:29
5	Arez defeated Taurus and Villano III Jr.	Three-way match for the inaugural La Leyenda Azul Blue Demon Championship	11:09
6	Los Hermanos Lee (Dragon Lee and Dralístico) defeated FTR (Dax Harwood and Cash Wheeler) (c)	Tag team match for the AAA World Tag Team Championship	15:56
7	Hijo del Vikingo (c) defeated Bandido	Singles match for the AAA Mega Championship	23:45
(c) / – the champion(s) heading into the match; D / – this was a dark match

== See also ==
- 2022 in professional wrestling
