= Guerra de Titanes (2023) =

2023 Lucha Libre AAA Worldwide show

- Promotional poster featuring various AAA wrestlers
- Promotion: Lucha Libre AAA Worldwide
- Date: November 19, 2023
- City: Ciudad Juárez, Chihuahua, Mexico
- Venue: Gimnasio Josué Neri Santos
- Attendance: 8,000+

Event chronology
← Previous; Héroes Inmortales	Next → Ultra Clash

Guerra de Titanes chronology
← Previous; 2019	Next → 2024

Guerra de Titanes (2023) (Spanish for "War of the Titans") was a professional wrestling event scripted and produced by the Lucha Libre AAA Worldwide (AAA) promotion. The show took place on November 19, 2023, at Gimnasio Josué Neri Santos in Ciudad Juárez, Chihuahua and was the twenty-fourth Guerra de Titanes show promoted by AAA since 1997.

== Production ==
=== Background ===
Starting in 1997 the Mexican professional wrestling, company AAA has held a major wrestling show late in the year, either November or December, called Guerra de Titanes ("War of the Titans"). The show often features championship matches or Lucha de Apuestas or bet matches where the competitors risked their wrestling mask or hair on the outcome of the match. In Lucha Libre, the Lucha de Apuetas match is considered more prestigious than a championship match and many major shows feature one or more Apuesta matches. The Guerra de Titanes show is hosted in a new location each year, emanating from cities such as Madero, Chihuahua City, Mexico City, Guadalajara, Jalisco and others. In 2016, AAA moved the Guerra de Titanes show to January but in 2018 the show was held in December which continued with the 2019 event.

On September 26, 2023, it was announced that Guerra de Titanes would take place on November 19, 2023, at Gimnasio Municipal Josue Neri Santos in Ciudad Juárez, Chihuahua.

=== Storylines ===
Guerra de Titanes feature several professional wrestling matches, with different wrestlers involved in pre-existing scripted feuds, plots and storylines. Wrestlers portrayed either heels (referred to as rudos in Mexico, those that portray the "bad guys") or faces (técnicos in Mexico, the "good guy" characters) as they followed a series of tension-building events, which culminated in wrestling matches.

== Results ==
No.	Results	Stipulations	Times
1	Nueva Generación Dinamita (Sansón and Forastero) defeated Arez and Komander (c) by pinfall	Tag team match for the AAA World Tag Team Championship	13:35
2	Lady Shani (with Sexy Star II) defeated Chik Tormenta (with Dalys)	Steel Cage match	15:18
3	Negro Casas and Pentagón Jr. defeated Coronel VIP and La Bestia del Ring by pinfall	Tag team match	12:02
4	Octagón Jr. defeated QT Marshall (c) (with Sam Adonis) by pinfall	Singles match for the AAA Latin American Championship	11:36
5	Mecha Wolf and Psycho Clown vs. Sam Adonis and El Texano Jr. ended in a no contest	Tag team match	15:24
6	El Hijo del Vikingo (c) defeated Dralístico by pinfall	Singles match for the AAA Mega Championship	17:32
(c) / – the champion(s) heading into the match
