= Guerra de Titanes (2019) =

2019 Lucha Libre AAA Worldwide show

- Promotional poster featuring various AAA wrestlers
- Promotion: Lucha Libre AAA Worldwide
- Date: December 14, 2019
- City: Ciudad Madero, Tamaulipas, Mexico
- Venue: Domo Madero

Event chronology
← Previous; Triplemanía Regia	Next → AAA vs MLW

Guerra de Titanes chronology
← Previous; December 2018	Next → 2023

Guerra de Titanes (2019) (Spanish for "War of the Titans") was a professional wrestling event scripted and produced by the Lucha Libre AAA World Wide (AAA) promotion. The show took take place on December 14, 2019, in Madero, Tamaulipas, Mexico at the Domo Madero building and was the twenty-third Guerra de Titanes show promoted by AAA since 1997. It was the last AAA PPV event held before the start of the COVID-19 pandemic, which began in mid-March 2020.

In the main event Blue Demon Jr., Rey Escorpión and Rush El Toro Blanco defeated Psycho Clown, Dr. Wagner Jr., and Drago, after which Rush, Konnan, L.A. Park, Killer Kross, and La Bestia del Ring announced that they were the newest version of La Facción Ingobernable. On the undercard, Big Mami defeated Lady Maravilla in a Lucha de Apuestas, Hair vs. Hair match, after which Lady Maravilla was forced to have her hair shaved off. Lucha Brothers (Pentagón Jr. and Fénix) successfully defended the AAA World Tag Team Championship against Jinetes del Aire (El Hijo del Vikingo and Myzteziz Jr.) and Australian Suicide/Rey Horus.

== Production ==
=== Background ===
Starting in 1997 the Mexican professional wrestling, company AAA has held a major wrestling show late in the year, either November or December, called Guerra de Titanes ("War of the Titans"). The show often features championship matches or Lucha de Apuestas or bet matches where the competitors risked their wrestling mask or hair on the outcome of the match. In Lucha Libre, the Lucha de Apuetas match is considered more prestigious than a championship match and many major shows feature one or more Apuesta matches. The Guerra de Titanes show is hosted in a new location each year, emanating from cities such as Madero, Chihuahua City, Mexico City, Guadalajara, Jalisco and others. In 2016, AAA moved the Guerra de Titanes show to January but in 2018 the show was held in December which continued with the 2019 event.

=== Storylines ===
Guerra de Titanes featured eight professional wrestling matches, with different wrestlers involved in pre-existing scripted feuds, plots and storylines. Wrestlers portrayed either heels (referred to as rudos in Mexico, those that portray the "bad guys") or faces (técnicos in Mexico, the "good guy" characters) as they followed a series of tension-building events, which culminated in wrestling matches.

== Aftermath ==
After the main event match, it was announced that Rush El Toro Blanco, La Bestia del Ring, Killer Kross, L.A. Park and Konnan were forming a new group called La Facción Ingobernable (based on Rush's Los Ingobernables group from CMLL).

== Results ==
No.	Results	Stipulations
1	Patriachia, Pescador, Shura and Sindrome defeated Harley, Hijo de Eclipse, Disturbio, and Lumio	Atomicos match
2	Aramís, Dinastía, and Octagoncito defeated Mini Psycho Clown, Arez, and La Parkita Negra	Trios match
3	Niño Hamburguesa, Mascarita Dorada, and Mr. Iguana defeated Demus, Villano III Jr., and Látigo	Trios match
4	Poder del Norte (Mocho Cota Jr., Tito Santana, and Carta Brava Jr.) defeated Taya Valkyrie, Faby Apache, Octagón Jr. and Abismo Negro Jr., Ayako Hamada, Keyra	Three-way Lumberjack Trios match
5	Killer Kross, Taurus, Texano Jr., and Chessman defeated Puma King, Murder Clown, Pagano, and Willie Mack	Tables, Ladders, and Chairs Atómicos match
6	Lucha Brothers (Pentagón Jr. and Fénix) (c) defeated Australian Suicide and Rey Horus and Jinetes del Aire (El Hijo del Vikingo and Myzteziz Jr.)	Three-way Tag team match for the AAA World Tag Team Championship
7	Big Mami (with Octagoncito) defeated Lady Maravilla (with Villano III Jr.)	Lucha de Apuestas, Hair vs. Hair match
8	Blue Demon Jr., Rey Escorpión and Rush El Toro Blanco defeated Psycho Clown, Dr. Wagner Jr., and Drago	No disqualification Trios match
(c) / – the champion(s) heading into the match

== See also ==
- 2019 in professional wrestling
