= Scarlett Bordeaux =

American professional wrestler (born 1991)

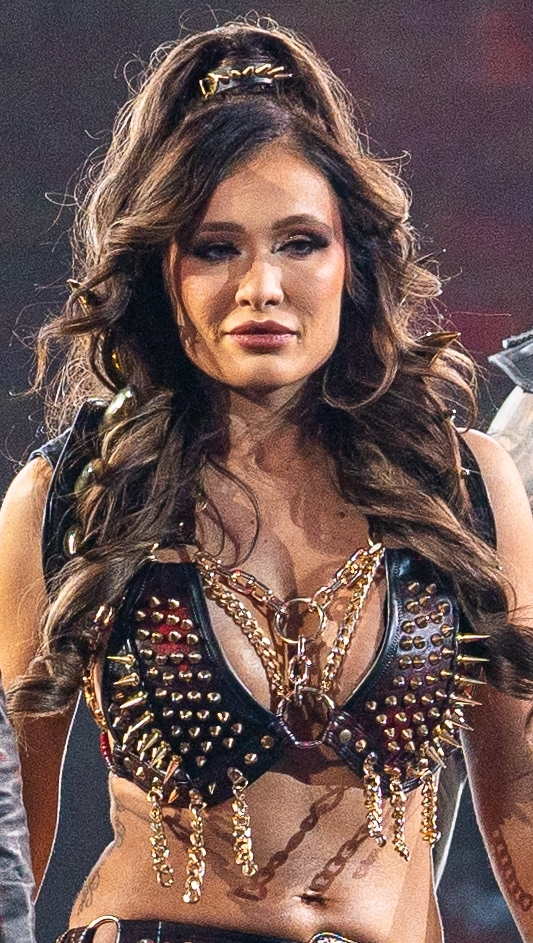
- Scarlett in 2024

Personal information
- Born: Elizabeth Chihaia; May 13, 1991 (age 35) Edgewater, Chicago, Illinois, U.S.
- Education: Columbia College Chicago (BFA)
- Spouse: Karrion Kross (m. 2022)

Professional wrestling career
- Ring name(s): Scarlett; Scarlett Bordeaux
- Billed height: 5 ft 8 in (173 cm)
- Billed from: Chicago, Illinois
- Trained by: Jimmy Jacobs; Truth Martini
- Debut: April 27, 2012

Elizabeth Chihaia-Kesar (born May 13, 1991), better known by her ring name Scarlett Bordeaux and simply Scarlett, is an American professional wrestler, model, singer and ring announcer. She is best known for her tenures in WWE, where she performed alongside her real life husband, Karrion Kross.

She is also known for her time on Lucha Libre AAA Worldwide, Ring of Honor (ROH), and Impact Wrestling. She has also competed in Ohio Valley Wrestling (OVW) as well as the independent circuit such as AAW Wrestling, Chikara, and Combat Zone Wrestling (CZW).

== Early life ==
Elizabeth Chihaia was born on May 13, 1991, in Edgewater, Chicago, Illinois. Her parents are of Romanian origin, and she lived with her grandparents in Romania until she was four. She returned to the U.S. and participated in choir while attending Carl Sandburg High School in Orland Park, Illinois. After high school, she became a full-time college student, majoring in musical theater, and graduated from Columbia College Chicago. She trained at a conservatory as a mezzo-soprano. Chihaia then made her professional wrestling debut in 2012.

== Professional wrestling career ==
=== Independent circuit (2012–2019) ===
Chihaia made her debut on April 27, 2012, at a CSW Southside Showdown event, as Scarlett Bordeaux defeated The Angel. During this time, Bordeaux adopted the heel persona of a superficial prima donna.

Bordeaux made her debut for Chikara where she began hosting "The Throwdown Lowdown", on her first one she interviewed 2 Cold Scorpio. Since then, Bordeaux continued to host "The Throwdown Lowdown". Bordeaux returned to Chikara on March 13, 2013, as "The Throwdown Lowdown" hostess replacing Natali Morris. It is new clips from Chikara's vast video vault, showcasing high-impact hits and brutal spills, as well as interviews. On July 9, 2016, Bordeaux pinned Joey Ryan to win DDT Pro Ironman Heavymetalweight however Bordeaux lost the title due to forfeit when Bordeaux traded the belt for Rhyno's autograph.

Bordeaux (kayfabe) quit AAW when she grew tired of objectifying herself in order to please the audience to get herself noticed causing her to be mistreated. At the AAW's "One Twisted Christmas" event on December 29, 2012, Shane Hollister defeated Colt Cabana. A stipulation of the match was if Cabana won, he would get Scarlett for the week. Bordeaux and Hollister got involved in Eddie Kingston's feud with Silas Young by offering Dan Lawrence and Markus Crane as bodyguards in order to get him to agree to be his tag-team partner, which resulted in tag team match at the AAW: EPIC – The 10th Anniversary Show event on March 24, which they would lose despite Bordeaux and Jordynne Grace's interferences. Hollister and Bordeaux interrupted ACH at AAW's Bound for Hate event on June 20, delivering some psychological warfare. She appeared at the AAW: Pro Wrestling Redefined's Point of No Return event, interfering in the AAW Heavyweight Championship main event match on Hollister's behalf, with her ending up getting speared by Jimmy Jacobs to secure Hollister's victory.

=== Ohio Valley Wrestling (2012) ===
Bordeaux received a tryout for Ohio Valley Wrestling (OVW) on the August 1, 2012 edition of OVW Episode 676, where she faced former two time OVW Women's Champion Epiphany in a singles match. Bordeaux returned to OVW making her televised debut on the October 3 edition of OVW Episode 685, where she competed against then OVW Women's Champion Heidi Lovelace in a losing effort after the match, Bordeaux would show good sportsmanship. Later that event, Bordeaux competed in her second match of the night defeating three-time champion "The (Irish) Redheaded Bombshell" Taeler Hendrix in a dark match to claim her first victory.

On the October 31 edition of OVW Episode 689, Bordeaux was defeated by The Queen of OVW and seven-time champion Josette Bynum in a minute to win to determine the last participate for the triple-treat match to face Hendrix and then-Women's Champion Lovelace, despite the interference by Hendrix. In that same episode, Bordeaux participated in a Halloween costume battle royal; however, she failed to become the number one contender to the OVW Women's Championship, which was won by Jessie Belle. Bordeaux made her final appearance in OVW on the November 22 edition of OVW Episode 692, where she was defeated by new OVW Women's Champion Taryn Terrell.

=== Ring of Honor (2013–2017) ===
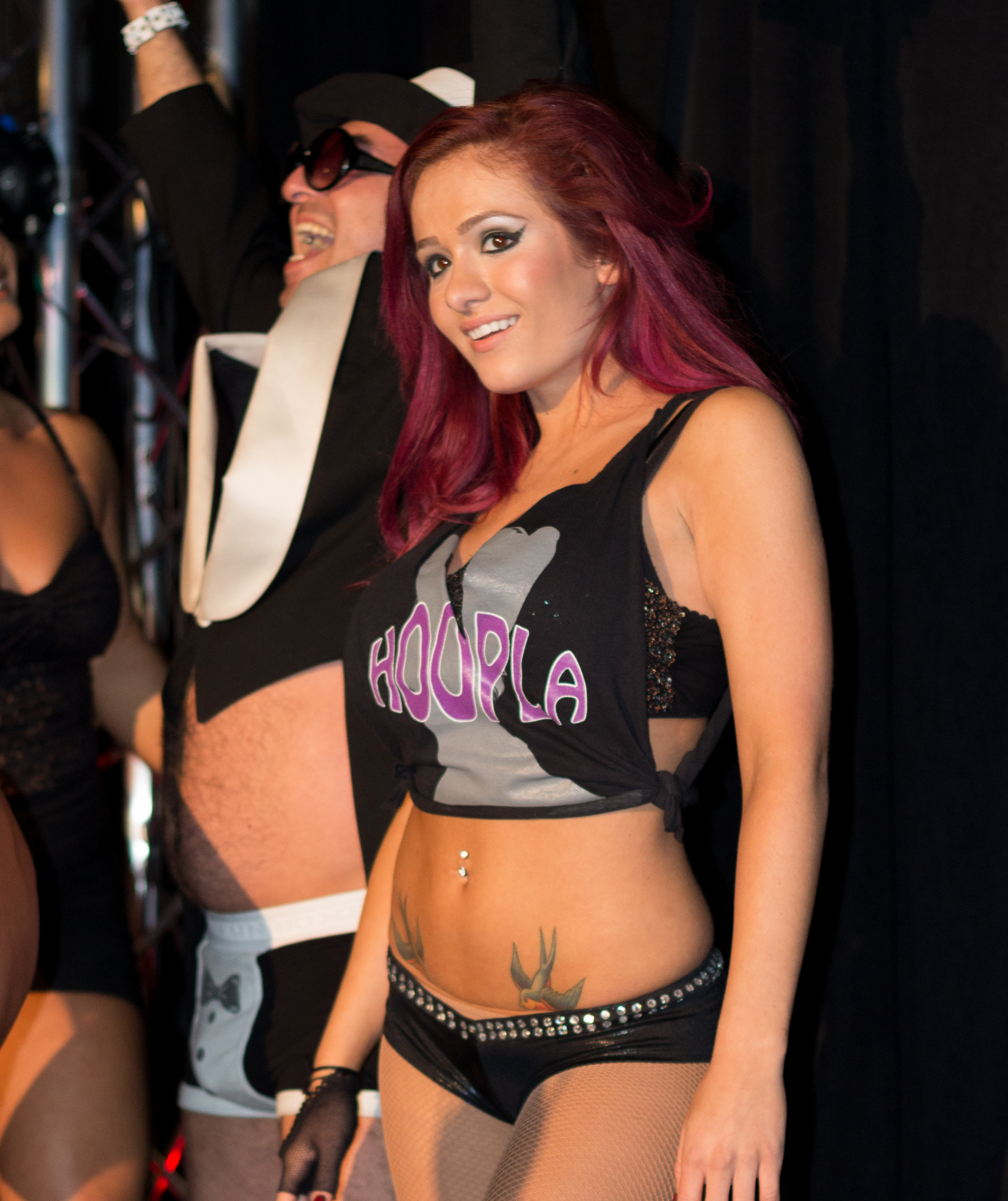
Bordeaux accompanying Truth Martini (immediately behind) at a Ring of Honor taping in Toronto in 2013

Scarlett made her debut for Ring of Honor (ROH) appearing in 11th Anniversary Show as a heel, accompanying the new member of The House of Truth Matt Taven alongside Truth Martini for his match against Adam Cole for the ROH World Television Championship. Since then, she and Seleziya Sparx–known collectively as the Hoopla Hotties–began accompanying Taven to his matches. Bordeaux made her in-ring debut on the April 6 episode of ROH, where she competed in a Four Corners "Women of Honor" match against Cherry Bomb, MsChif, and the eventual winner Athena, when she pinned Cherry Bomb with her "O-Face" finisher. On April 20, 2013, episode of ROH Wrestling, she aided Taven in a victory against ACH by distracting the ref, allowing Taven to get the victory. At the Border Wars pay-per-view, The Hoopla Hotties accompanied Taven to the ring where he successfully defended the ROH World Television Championship against Mark Briscoe following the distraction by Bordeaux. At the Best in the World pay-per-view, The Hoopla Hotties once again accompanied Taven to the ring, where he successfully defended the title belt against Jay Lethal and Jimmy Jacobs in a Three-way match. During the match, Bordeaux slapped Lethal in the face, causing him to rip her top off in retaliation, leaving her completely topless in the middle of the ring with her breasts briefly exposed.

At the "Night of Hoopla" pay-per-view, Bordeaux was featured in number of "Hoopla Hotties" segments including "Take Your Pants Off Dance-Off." as well as performing the H.O.T. national anthem and interfering in the triple-treat match on Taven's behalf. On the September 14 episode of ROH Wrestling, Scarlett was unable to manage Taven in his Ring of Honor World Championship Tournament match, when commentator Nigel McGuinness revealed that Bordeaux didn't have proper managers license, forcing her to sit at ringside. At the Glory by Honor XII pay-per-view, Scarlett and Kasey Ray attempted to persuade Lethal during Champions vs. All-Stars 8-Man Tag Team Elimination Match but failed leading to Ray going through a table.

After losing the title to Tommaso Ciampa, Taven turned face and fired Truth Martini ending their services with Bordeaux and Martini. Ever since The House of Truth broke up at the start of 2014, Scarlett was no longer a "Hoopla Hottie" and began to share ring announcer duties with Bobby Cruise at ROH television tapings and live events. As a part of her ring announcing duties, Scarlett announced at ROH's 12th Anniversary Show, a moment she later claimed as a favorite in her career along with her in-ring debut and her time as a "Hoopla Hottie". At the ROH Unauthorized presents: "Michael Bennett's Bachelor Party" pay-per-view, Scarlett teamed up with Hendrix and "Crazy" Mary Dobson in a losing effort to the team of Veda Scott, Heather Patera and Leah von Dutch, when Scott pinned Bordeaux after a back-drop driver.

=== Total Nonstop Action Wrestling/Impact Wrestling (2014, 2018–2019) ===
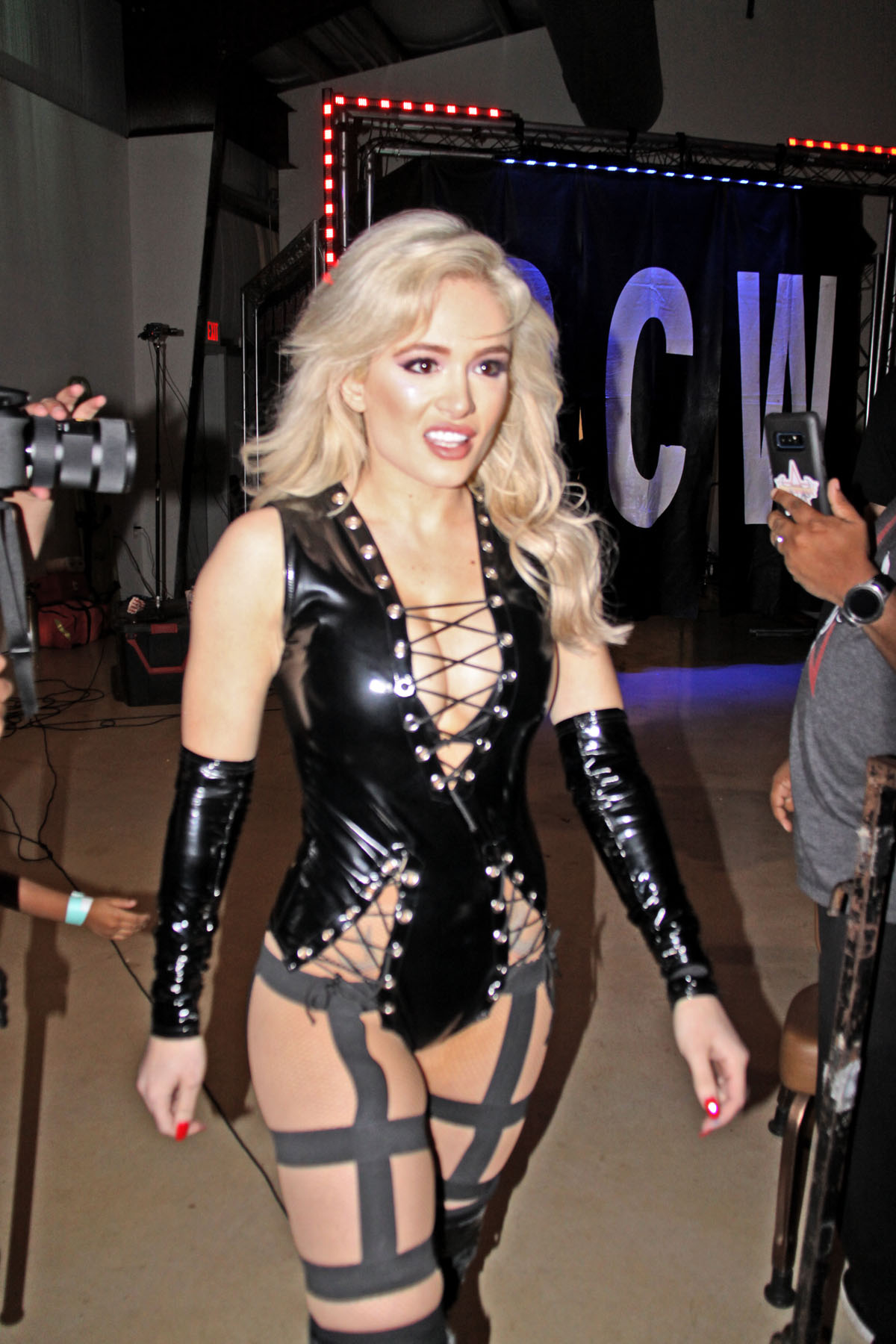
Bordeaux in 2019

On May 10, 2014, Bordeaux appeared at Total Nonstop Action Wrestling's One Night Only Knockouts Knockdown pay-per-view, facing the TNA Knockouts Champion Angelina Love, but failed to qualify for the Knockouts Gauntlet match to crown the "Queen of the Knockouts" later that night.

On the July 26, 2018 episode of Impact, Bordeaux made her debut during an interview with Alicia Atout. Bordeaux portrayed a sexy temptress character, even dubbing herself the "Smoke Show". In August, Bordeaux was given her own recurring segment titled "The Smoke Show". On the March 29, 2019 episode of Impact, she made her in-ring debut by defeating Glenn Gilbertti. On the April 20 episode of Impact, Bordeaux started teaming with Fallah Bahh and defeated Desi Hit Squad. With Bahh by her side, Bordeaux had her first pay-per-view match at Rebellion, where she was victorious over Rohit Raju. In May, it was reported Bordeaux requested her release from the promotion. On June 18, Impact Wrestling announced that Bordeaux had been released from her contract.

=== Lucha Libre AAA Worldwide (2018–2019) ===
With Impact Wrestling partnership with AAA, on September 7, 2018, Bordeaux made her debut in Cancún, teaming with Keyra and La Hiedra defeating Lady Shani, Lady Maravilla and Vanilla Vargas. On October 28, at Héroes Inmortales XII, Bordeaux competed in a Four-way match for the AAA Reina de Reinas Championship against Star Fire, Keyra, and Faby Apache, which was won by Apache. On December 2, at Guerra de Titanes, Bordeaux competed in a four-way match for the AAA Reina de Reinas Championship against titleholder Faby Apache, La Hiedra, and Lady Shani, which was won by Shani. On August 3 at Triplemanía XXVII, Bordeaux teamed up with Sammy Guevara for the AAA World Mixed Tag Team Championship against Australian Suicide and Vanilla Vargas, Niño Hamburguesa and Big Mami, and Lady Maravilla and Villano III Jr., where Bordeaux and Guevara were defeated.

=== WWE (2014–2016, 2019–2021) ===
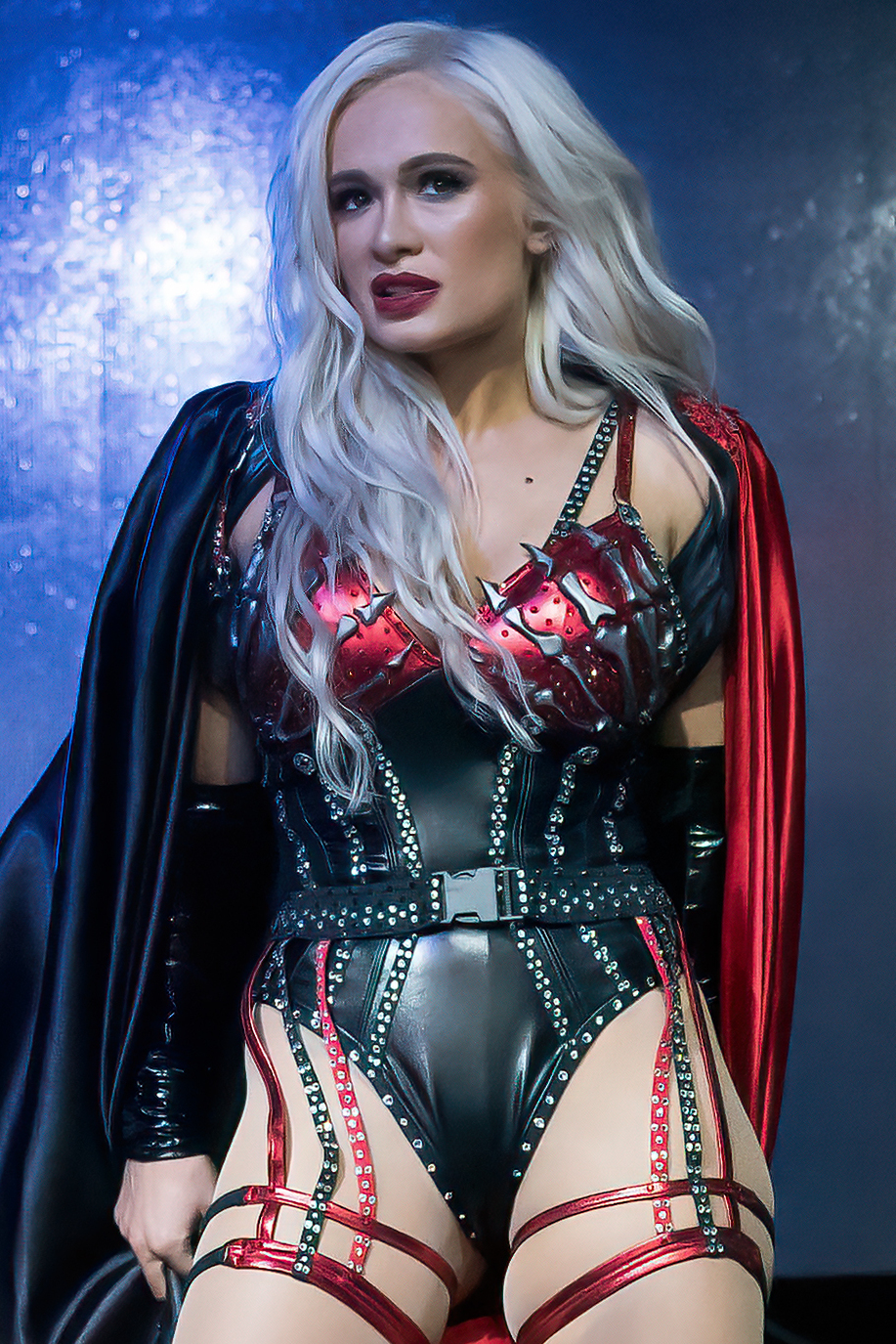
Bordeaux in 2022

Bordeaux made her first appearance in WWE as one of Adam Rose's various colorful costumed party-goers named the Rosebuds at the Payback pay-per-view on June 1, 2014. She later stated that she had performed as a Rosebud about 15 times by March 2015. She made her WWE in-ring debut under the name Scarlett on the December 26, 2016 episode of WWE Raw, being presented as a local talent before losing to Nia Jax.

In September 2019, Bordeaux attended a private tryout at the WWE Performance Center in Orlando, Florida. In November, WWE announced that they had signed Bordeaux to a contract and that she was set to report to the WWE Performance Center that same month. She made her debut, reprising the Scarlett mononym ring-name from her 2016 one-off match, as the valet of her real-life boyfriend, Karrion Kross, on NXT on May 6, 2020, and continued to manage him throughout his run on the brand, including during his NXT Championship wins at TakeOver XXX and NXT TakeOver: Stand & Deliver. On November 4, 2021, Scarlett was released by WWE along with Kross, as part of a seventh round of layoffs, due to the COVID-19 pandemic, that involved administrative staff, plant and talents of the franchise.

=== Major League Wrestling (2022) ===
On June 2, 2022, it was announced that Bordeaux would make her debut at Battle Riot IV. She defeated Clara Carreras by pinfall in a singles match.

=== Return to WWE (2022–2025) ===
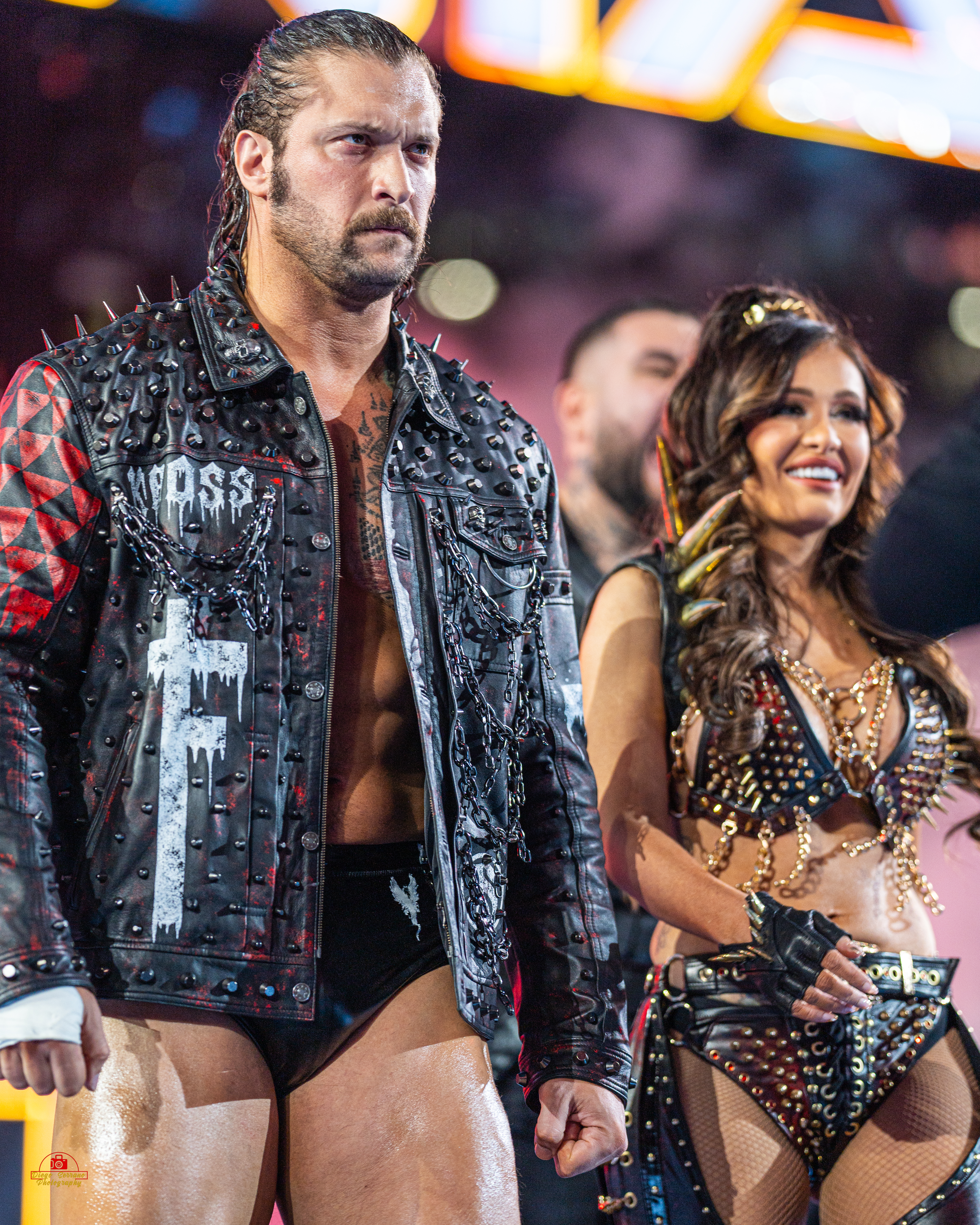
Scarlett and Karrion Kross at WrestleMania XL

On the August 5, 2022, episode of SmackDown, Scarlett, alongside Kross, returned to WWE by attacking Drew McIntyre at the conclusion of the show. In the following months, she returned to the managerial role she had performed during her previous run in the company, while also starting to occasionally interfere in matches to help Kross win. In December 2022, Scarlett was involved in her first feud when she and Kross briefly feuded with the also real-life couple Emma and Madcap Moss, which culminated in a mixed tag team match on the January 6, 2023, episode of SmackDown where Scarlett and Kross would win in what was Scarlett's first televised match as a signed WWE superstar. On the June 16 episode of SmackDown, Scarlett teamed up with Kross again in another winning effort against AJ Styles and Michin.

In October 2023, Scarlett hosted NXT Halloween Havoc alongside Shotzi. On the December 22, 2023 episode of SmackDown, Scarlett and Kross appeared in a vignette, stating that they have formed a new alliance. On SmackDown: New Year's Revolution, Scarlett accompanied Kross in attacking Bobby Lashley and the Street Profits alongside the Authors of Pain and Paul Ellering who officially made their return to WWE, confirming their alliance in the process. The feud between the two stables culminated in a Philadelphia Street Fight at WrestleMania XL with Scarlett serving as their manager opposite B-Fab, marking her first appearance in the annual pay-per-view. On the following episode of NXT, Scarlett made her return to the brand alongside The Final Testament.

During night 2 of the WWE Draft, which occurred on April 29, 2024, Scarlett was drafted to WWE Raw, with the rest of The Final Testament. Towards the end of the year, she, along with the rest of the Final Testament, began feuding with The Wyatt Sicks, which resulted in her wrestling Nikki Cross as part of mixed tag matches in WWE Live shows. On February 7, 2025, The Final Testament disbanded after AOP and Paul Ellering were released from their WWE contracts, leaving Kross and Scarlett the only members left. On August 10, Kross and Scarlett's WWE contracts both expired and were not renewed, ending their three-year second tenure with the company.

=== Return to MLW (2025–present) ===
Bordeaux made her return to MLW on November 20, 2025 at Don Gato Tequila, where she defeated Isla Dawn.

== Other media ==
Chihaia appeared in WWE 2K22 and WWE 2K23 as a manager under her Scarlett persona. She made her first appearance as a playable character in WWE 2K24, also appearing in WWE 2K25. She was featured in other WWE related merchandise, including three Mattel action figures. She also sang the theme song titled "Dead Silent" for her stable with Karrion Kross, which was first released by WWE on streaming services in June 2020. In April 2021, Chihaia was featured in a song titled "Indestructible" under her stage name Scarlett Bordeaux, with Shotzi and Harley Cameron, and appeared in its music video as well. In October 2022, they released another music video together for a cover of "I Put a Spell on You". In September 2023, she started hosting a ghost hunting show titled "Chamber of Horrors" alongside Shotzi on WWE's YouTube channel. The show returned in the following year, with more episodes being uploaded on their own YouTube channel as well.

== Personal life ==
Chihaia is married to fellow professional wrestler Kevin Kesar, better known by his ring name, Karrion Kross. On September 23, 2021, they announced their engagement. On April 20, 2022, they announced their marriage in Alaska, in a private ceremony on a glacier.

== Championships and accomplishments ==
- DDT Pro-Wrestling
  - Ironman Heavymetalweight Championship (1 time)
- East Coast Wrestling Association
  - ECWA Women's Championship (1 time)
- Maryland Championship Wrestling
  - MCW Rage Television Championship (1 time)
- Masters of Ring Entertainment
  - MORE Wrestling Women's Championship (1 time, final)
- Pro Wrestling After Dark
  - SAW Women's Championship (1 time)
- Pro Wrestling Illustrated
  - Ranked No. 89 of the top 100 female wrestlers in the PWI Female 100 in 2019
- Romanian Pro Wrestling
  - RPW Queen Of The Castle Championship (1 time, current)
