= Big Mami =

Mexican professional wrestler

Personal information
- Born: Alejandra Montes Luna; 25 December 1989 (age 36) Mexico City
- Parent: Mago Fantasma (father)
- Relative: Caramelo (brother)

Professional wrestling career
- Ring name(s): Big Mami; Big Mama
- Billed height: 1.60 m (5 ft 3 in)
- Billed weight: 108 kg (238 lb)
- Trained by: Panchito Villalobos
- Debut: 2006

Alejandra Montes Luna (born 25 December 1989) is a Mexican professional wrestler, best known by the ring name Big Mami. She currently signed to promotion Lucha Libre AAA Worldwide (AAA). She is a former AAA World Mixed Tag Team Champion with Niño Hamburguesa.

== Professional wrestling career ==
=== Independent circuit (2006–2016) ===
Luna made her debut on the independent circuit under the name Big Mama, teaming with Super Nina, they defeated Cat Killer & El Rebelde. With the passage of time, Mami fought in other independent promotions such as Reyes del Ring, International Wrestling League, Universal Wrestling Entertainment, among others.

On 15 February 2013, Mama had a match in Fusion Ichiban Silver Astro Benefit Show for the Fusion Ichiban Kawai Women's Championship, which was won by Ludark Shaitan. In mid-2015, Mama won her first championship in her career, after defeating India Mazahua and Lady Maravilla crowning herself as HUMO Women's Champion. On 26 July in the function of Promotions HUMO Female Stars, Mama lost her title to her rival Lady Maravilla.

=== Lucha Libre AAA Worldwide (2016–present) ===
In mid-2016, Mami began appearing in the largest company in Mexico, Lucha Libre AAA Worldwide (AAA) for some events, with her new ring name as Big Mami. On 2 October 2016 at Héroes Inmortales X, Mami competed for the Copa Antonio Peña being the first women's to participate in this match, along with Lady Shani and in the end was won by Pimpinela Escarlata. On 19 March 2017 in Rey de Reyes, Mami competed for the opportunity for the AAA Reina de Reinas Championship, was defeated Ayako Hamada. On 19 June in Nuevo Laredo, Mami competed with Niño Hamburguesa for the AAA World Mixed Tag Team Championship defeating Venum and Lady Shani to win the title. On 31 May 2018, in Pachuca, Mami along with Niño Hamburguesa had their first defense defeating Villano III Jr. & La Hiedra. Their second defense took place on 25 August in Triplemanía XXVI who defeated Dinastia & Lady Maravilla, El Hijo del Vikingo & Vanilla Vargas and Angelikal & La Hiedra. Their third defense took place on 16 March in Rey de Reyes who defeated Maravilla and Villano III Jr., where the feud between Maravilla and Mami began. On 3 August 2019 in Triplemanía XXVII, Hamburguesa and Mami lost their titles to Maravilla and Villano, where it was a four-way tag team match, which also included the teams of Australian Suicide & Vanilla and Sammy Guevara & Scarlett Bordeaux in their fourth defense, ending their 775-day reign, being the second longest reign of the championship.

== Championships and accomplishments ==
- Lucha Libre AAA Worldwide
  - AAA World Mixed Tag Team Championship (1 time) – with Niño Hamburguesa
- Promociones HUMO
  - HUMO Women's Championship (1 time)

== Luchas de Apuestas record ==
Winner (wager)	Loser (wager)	Location	Event	Date	Notes
Big Mami (hair)	Lady Maravilla (hair)	Ciudad Madero, Tamaulipas, Mexico	Guerra de Titanes	14 December 2019	
