= Gimnasio Josué Neri Santos =

Indoor arena in Ciudad Juárez, Chihuahua, Mexico

The Gimnasio Josué Neri Santos is an indoor arena located in Ciudad Juárez, Chihuahua. It is currently used mostly for Basketball matches and can seat about 8,000 people.
