= AAA World Mixed Tag Team Championship =

Professional wrestling championship

AAA World Mixed Tag Team Championship (Campeonato en Parejas Mixtas AAA)
- Top: The red version of the title belt the female champion carries. Bottom: The blue version of the title belt the male champion carries.

Details
- Promotion: Lucha Libre AAA Worldwide
- Date established: June 15, 2003
- Current champions: Big Mami and Niño Hamburguesa
- Date won: November 14, 2026 (aired TBA)
Statistics
- First champions: Lady Apache and Electroshock
- Most reigns: As tag team (2 reigns): Cynthia Moreno and El Oriental; As individual (4 reigns): Faby Apache
- Longest reign: Lady Maravilla and Villano III Jr. (800 days)
- Shortest reign: Decay (Havok and Crazzy Steve) (63 days)
- Oldest champion: Gran Apache (48 years, 228 days)
- Youngest champion: Christina Von Eerie (20 years, 308 days)

The AAA World Mixed Tag Team Championship (Campeonato en Parejas Mixtas AAA in Spanish) is a tag team title contested for in the Mexican promotion Lucha Libre AAA Worldwide (AAA), a sister promotion of WWE. The championship is exclusively for teams composed of one male wrestler and one female wrestler. The current champions are Big Mami and Niño Hamburguesa who are in their second reign as a team and individually. They won the titles by defeating La Hiedra and Laredo Kid on the November 14, 2026, taping of Lucha Libre AAA.

== 2005 tournament ==
This tournament for the AAA World Mixed Tag Team Championship took place at Sin Limite: Guerra de Titanes on December 10, 2005.

1st Round; Sin Limite: Guerra de Titanes; December 10, 2005 (Aired: December 25)
Cynthia Moreno and El Oriental	Win
Tiffany and Gran Apache	—
Estrellita and Billy Boy	—
La Diabólica and Chessman	Win

Final; Sin Limite: Guerra de Titanes; December 10, 2005 (Aired: December 25)
Cynthia Moreno and El Oriental	Win
La Diabólica and Chessman	—

== Title history ==
Overall, there have been 24 reigns between 22 teams composed of 37 individual champions and four vacancies. Lady Apache and Electroshock were the inaugural champions. As a tag team, Cynthia Moreno and El Oriental have the most reigns with two. Individually, Faby Apache has the most reigns with four. Lady Maravilla and Villano III Jr. have the longest reign at 800 days, while Decay (Havok and Crazzy Steve have the shortest reign at 63 days. Gran Apache is the oldest champion at 48 years and 228 days, while Christina Von Eerie is the youngest champion at 20 years and 308 days.

Big Mami and Niño Hamburguesa are the current champions in their second reign as a team and individually. They won the titles by defeating La Hiedra and Laredo Kid on the November 14, 2026, taping of Lucha Libre AAA in Mexico City, Mexico.

Key
No.	Overall reign number
Reign	Reign number for the specific team—reign numbers for the individuals are in parentheses, if different
Days	Number of days held
Days recog.	Number of days held recognized by the promotion
+	Current reign is changing daily

No.	Champion	Championship change			Reign statistics			Notes	Ref.
No.	Champion	Date	Event	Location	Reign	Days	Days recog.	Notes	Ref.
Lucha Libre AAA Worldwide (AAA)
1	Lady Apache and Electroshock	June 15, 2003	Triplemanía XI	Naucalpan, Mexico	1	93	105	Defeated Faby Apache and Gran Apache, Martha Villalobos and El Brazo, and Tiffany and Chessman in a four-way tag team elimination match to become the inaugural champions.	
2	Tiffany and Chessman	September 16, 2003	Sin Limite: Verano de Escándalo	San Luis Potosí, San Luis Potosí, Mexico	1	320	315	Aired on September 28.	
3	Faby Apache and Gran Apache	August 1, 2004	Sin Limite	Guadalupe, Puebla, Mexico	1	350	343	This four-way tag team match also featured Lady Apache and Electroshock and Cynthia Moreno and El Oriental. Aired on August 8.	
—	Vacated	July 17, 2005	—	—	—	—	—	Faby Apache did not appear for a title defense.	
4	Cynthia Moreno and El Oriental	December 10, 2005	Sin Limite: Guerra de Titanes	Guadalajara, Jalisco, Mexico	1	720	705	Defeated La Diabólica and Chessman in the tournament final to win the vacant titles. Aired on December 25.	
—	Vacated	November 30, 2007	—	—	—	—	—	Cynthia Moreno suffered an injury.	
5	Mari Apache and Gran Apache	November 30, 2007	Sin Limite: Guerra de Titanes	Madero, Tamaulipas, Mexico	1 (1, 2)	289	266	Defeated Faby Apache and Billy Boy, La Diabolica and Espiritu, and Ayako Hamada and Mr. Niebla in a four-way tag team match to win the vacant titles.	
6	Cynthia Moreno and El Oriental	September 14, 2008	Sin Limite: Verano de Escándalo	Zapopan, Jalisco, Mexico	2	357	371	Aired on September 21.	
7	Faby Apache and Aero Star	September 6, 2009	Sin Limite	Unión de Tula, Jalisco, Mexico	1 (2, 1)	299	294	Aired on September 27.	
8	La Legión Extranjera (Christina Von Eerie and Alex Koslov)	July 2, 2010	Sin Limite	Ciudad del Carmen, Campeche, Mexico	1	91	84	Aired on July 18.	
9	Faby Apache and Pimpinela Escarlata	October 1, 2010	Sin Limite: Héroes Inmortales IV	Madero, Tamaulipas, Mexico	1 (3, 1)	163	161	Aired on October 10.	
10	La Sociedad (Jennifer Blake and Alan Stone)	March 13, 2011	Sin Limite	Morelia, Michoacán, Mexico	1	574	587	Aired on March 20.	
11	Mari Apache and Halloween	October 7, 2012	Sin Limite: Héroes Inmortales VI	San Luis Potosí, San Luis Potosí, Mexico	1 (2, 1)	285	287	This four-way tag team match also featured Faby Apache and Atomic Boy and Lolita and Fénix. Sexy Star was the special guest referee. Aired on October 27.	
12	Faby Apache and Drago	July 19, 2013	Sin Limite	Xalapa, Veracruz, Mexico	1 (4, 1)	274	259	Aired on August 10.	
13	La Sociedad (Sexy Star and Pentagón Jr.)	April 19, 2014	Sin Limite	Mexico City, Mexico	1	671	671	Aired on April 26.	
—	Vacated	February 19, 2016	Sin Limite	Querétaro, Querétaro, Mexico	—	—	—	On February 5, Sexy Star relinquished her half of the title. On February 19, Pentagón Jr. successfully defended the title in a 2-on-1 Handicap match against Taya and Daga. Afterwards, he also relinquished the title. Aired on February 26.	
14	Big Mami and Niño Hamburguesa	June 19, 2017	AAA	Nuevo Laredo, Tamaulipas, Mexico	1	775	775	Defeated Lady Shani and Venum to win the vacant titles.	
15	Lady Maravilla and Villano III Jr.	August 3, 2019	Triplemanía XXVII	Mexico City, Mexico	1	800	812	This four-way tag team match also featured Vanilla and Australian Suicide and Scarlett Bordeaux and Sammy Guevara. Aired on October 23.	
16	Los Vipers (Chik Tormenta and Arez)	October 11, 2021	AAA	Xalapa, Veracruz, Mexico	1	201	189	Aired on October 23.	
17	Jericho Appreciation Society (Tay Conti/Melo and Sammy Guevara)	April 30, 2022	Triplemanía XXX: Monterrey	Monterrey, Nuevo León, Mexico	1	242	242	This four-way tag team match also featured Maravilla and Látigo and Sexy Star II and Komander. On August 12, Conti's ring name was changed to Tay Melo.	
—	Vacated	December 28, 2022	—	—	—	—	—	Tay Melo and Sammy Guevara did not appear for a title defense.	
18	Flammer and Abismo Negro Jr.	December 28, 2022	Noche de Campeones	Acapulco, Guerrero, Mexico	1	648	648	Defeated Sexy Star II and Komander and Lady Shani and Octagón Jr. in a three-way match to win the vacant titles.	
19	Decay (Havok and Crazzy Steve)	October 6, 2024	Héroes Inmortales XVI	Zapopan, Jalisco, Mexico	1	63	63		
20	La Hiedra and Mr. Iguana	December 8, 2024	Cierre de La Gira Orígenes	Monterrey, Nuevo León, Mexico	1	329	329		
21	Chelsea Green and Ethan Page	November 2, 2025	Alianzas	Monterrey, Nuevo León, Mexico	1	97	97		
22	Lola Vice and Mr. Iguana	February 7, 2026	Lucha Libre AAA	Santiago de Queretaro, Queretaro, Mexico	1 (1, 2)	168	168	La Hiedra wrestled on behalf of Chelsea Green, who was unable to compete due to a foot injury.	
23	La Hiedra and Laredo Kid	July 25, 2026	Verano de Escándalo	Aguascalientes, Aguascalientes, Mexico	1 (2, 1)	112	112		
24	Big Mami and Niño Hamburguesa	November 14, 2026	Lucha Libre AAA	Mexico City, Mexico	2	3+	3+	Will air via tape delay on a future date.	

== Combined reigns ==
As of November 17, 2026.

=== By team ===
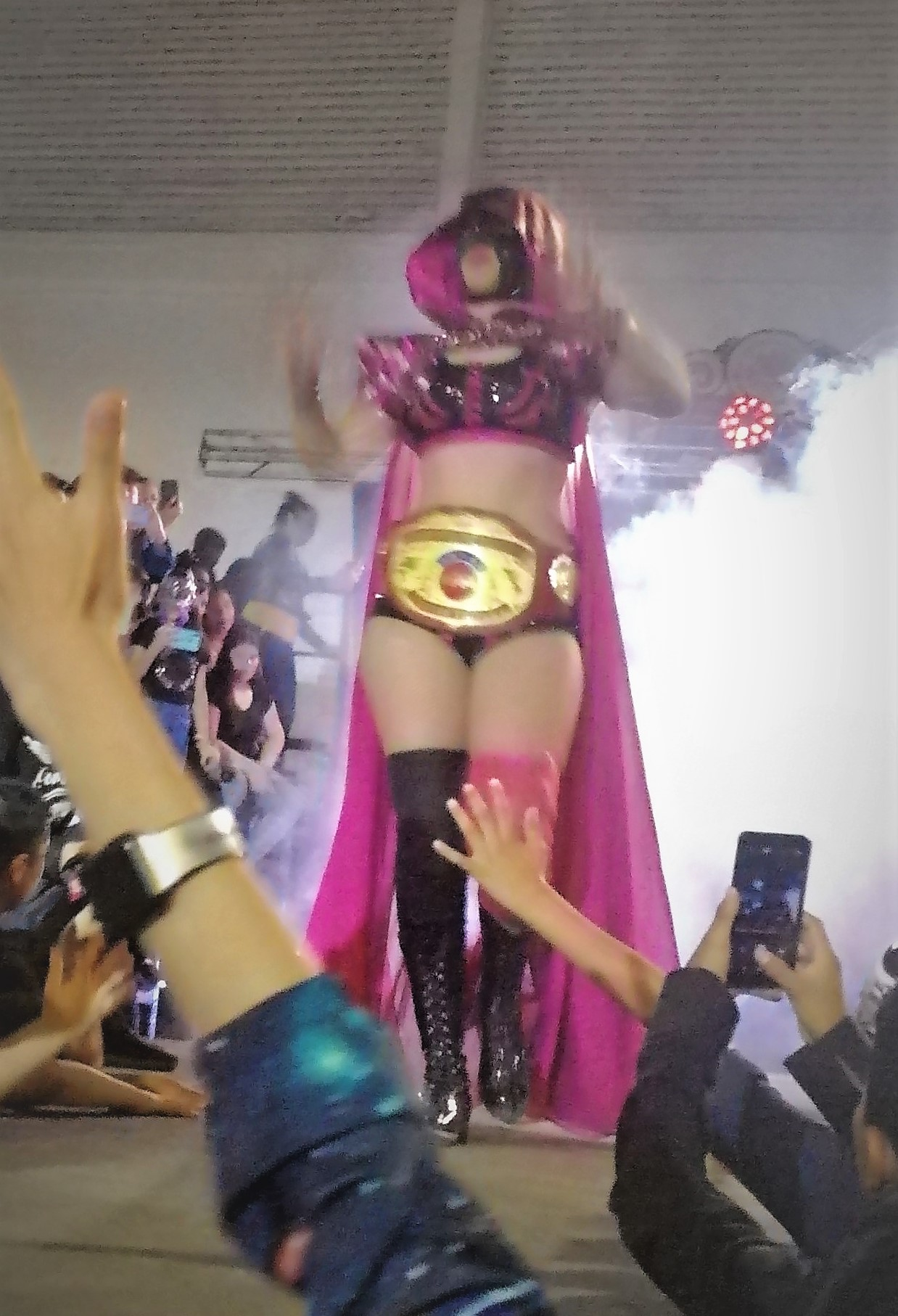
Lady Maravilla and Villano III Jr. (not pictured) hold the longest reign at 800 days.

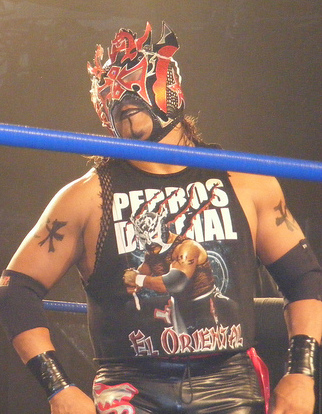
Cynthia Moreno (not pictured) and El Oriental have the most reigns as a team with two. They also have the most combined days at 1,077 days.

†	Indicates the current champion

Rank	Team (Note: Female wrestlers are listed first.)	No. of reigns	Combined days	
Rank	Team	No. of reigns	Actual	Recognized by AAA
1	Cynthia Moreno and El Oriental	2	1,077	1,076
2	Lady Maravilla and Villano III Jr.	1	800	812
3	Big Mami and Niño Hamburguesa †	2	756+	
4	La Sociedad (Sexy Star and Pentagón Jr.)	1	671	
5	Flammer and Abismo Negro Jr.	1	648	
6	La Sociedad (Jennifer Blake and Alan Stone)	1	574	587
7	Faby Apache and Gran Apache	1	350	343
8	La Hiedra and Mr. Iguana	1	329	
9	Tiffany and Chessman	1	320	315
10	Faby Apache and Aero Star	1	299	294
11	Mari Apache and Gran Apache	1	289	266
12	Mari Apache and Halloween	1	285	287
13	Faby Apache and Drago	1	274	259
14	Jericho Appreciation Society (Tay Conti/Melo and Sammy Guevara)	1	242	
15	Los Vipers (Chik Tormenta and Arez)	1	201	189
16	Lola Vice and Mr. Iguana	1	168	
17	Faby Apache and Pimpinela Escarlata	1	163	161
18	La Hiedra and Laredo Kid	1	112	112
19	Chelsea Green and Ethan Page	1	97	
20	Lady Apache and Electroshock	1	93	105
21	La Legión Extranjera (Christina Von Eerie and Alex Koslov)	1	91	84
22	Decay (Havok and Crazzy Steve)	1	63	

=== By wrestler ===
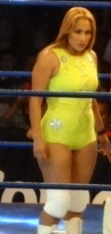
Record-setting four-time champion Faby Apache has the most combined days at 1,086.

Rank	Wrestler	No. of reigns	Combined days	
Rank	Wrestler	No. of reigns	Actual	Recognized by AAA
1	Faby Apache	4	1,086	1,057
2	Cynthia Moreno	2	1,077	1,076
2	El Oriental	2	1,077	1,076
4	Gran Apache	2	639	609
5	Lady Maravilla	1	800	812
5	Villano III Jr.	1	800	812
7	Big Mami †	1	756+	
7	Niño Hamburguesa †	1	756+	
9	Pentagón Jr.	1	671	
9	Sexy Star	1	671	
11	Abismo Negro Jr.	1	648	
11	Flammer	1	648	
13	Mari Apache	2	574	553
13	Jennifer Blake	1	574	587
13	Alan Stone	1	574	587
16	Mr. Iguana	2	497	
17	La Hiedra	2	441	
18	Chessman	1	320	315
18	Tiffany	1	320	315
20	Aero Star	1	299	294
21	Halloween	1	285	287
22	Drago	1	274	259
23	Sammy Guevara	1	242	
23	Tay Conti/Melo	1	242	
25	Arez	1	201	189
25	Chik Tormenta	1	201	189
27	Lola Vice	1	168	
28	Pimpinela Escarlata	1	163	161
29	Laredo Kid	1	112	
30	Chelsea Green	1	97	
30	Ethan Page	1	97	
32	Electroshock	1	93	105
32	Lady Apache	1	93	105
34	Alex Koslov	1	91	84
34	Christina Von Eerie	1	91	84
36	Crazzy Steve	1	63	
36	Havok	1	63	

== See also ==
- Tag team championships in WWE
- List of current champions in Lucha Libre AAA Worldwide
