= Vanilla Vargas =

Puerto Rican professional wrestler

Personal information
- Born: Jenyvalice Vargas Torres Bayamon, Puerto Rico
- Spouse: Broderick Shepherd (m. 2021; died 2025)

Professional wrestling career
- Ring name(s): Jeny Lady; Lady Puerto Rico; Lady Boricua; Vanilla Vargas; Vanilla
- Trained by: Sensacional Carlitos; Arkangel de la Muerte
- Debut: 2014

Jenyvalice Vargas Torres is a Puerto Rican professional wrestler, best known by the ring name Vanilla Vargas or Vanilla. She is currently working for Lucha Libre AAA Worldwide (AAA). She has also worked for promotions like World Wrestling Council and World Wrestling League.

== Professional wrestling career ==
=== Independent circuit (2014–present) ===
Vargas made her debut under the ring name Lady Boricua on the independent circuit teaming with Princesa Dorada and was defeated by Ludark Shaitan. In June 2015, Boricua made her debut under the new ring name Vanilla Vargas, where she was defeated by Roxxy in a singles match.

On July 16, 2016 in Consejo Mundial de Lucha Libre, where she teamed with Mima Shimoda and Princesa Sugehit where they defeated Dalys la Caribeña, La Comandante & Reina Isis.

On March 3, 2017, Vargas defeated Miss Hannah to win the vacant CKCW Women's Championship being her first title. On July 8, Vargas made her first successful defense of the CKCW Women's Championship against Taya. On November 11, Vargas defeated Miss Hannah for her second successful title defense. On February 10, 2018, at CKCW New World Rising, Vargas defeated Solo Darling for her third successful title defense.

=== Lucha Libre AAA Worldwide (2018–2020) ===
On June 26, 2018 Vargas was announced as working for Lucha Libre AAA Worldwide, representing the AAA alongside a number of other independent wrestlers. On July 21, 2018, at AAA vs. Elite, Vanilla Vargas made her debut in AAA teaming with Faby Apache and La Hiedra, winning to Team Elite (Keira, Lady Maravilla and Zeuxis). On August 26 at Triplemanía XXVI, Vanilla teamed up with El Hijo del Vikingo for the AAA World Mixed Tag Team Championship against Dinastía and Lady Maravilla, Angelikal and La Hiedra and Niño Hamburguesa and Big Mami, where they managed to retain their titles.

On September 7, 2018 in Cancun, Vanilla teaming with Lady Shani, Lady Maravilla where they defeated Keyra, La Hiedra and Scarlett Bordeaux.

On August 3, 2019 at Triplemanía XXVII, Vanilla teamed up with Australian Suicide for the AAA World Mixed Tag Team Championship against Sammy Guevara and Scarlett Bordeaux, Niño Hamburguesa and Big Mami and Lady Maravilla and Villano III Jr., where Maravilla and Villano were crowned as new champions.

=== Impact Wrestling (2019) ===
On August 30, 2019, Vanilla made her debut for Impact Wrestling as part of the promotion's partnership with teaming with Kiera Hogan and Madison Rayne where was defeated against Chik Tormenta, Jordynne Grace and Rosemary.

== Personal life ==
On 7 July 2020, she and Broderick Shepherd (better known by his ring name "Australian Suicide") announced on Twitter that they were expecting their first child together. They married in 2021. Shepherd died on 6 March 2025 at the age of 32.

== Championships and accomplishments ==
- Cleveland Knights Championship Wrestling
  - CKCW Women's Championship (1 time, current)
- Coastal Championship Wrestling
  - CCW Ladies Championship (1 time)
- Colombia Pro Wrestling
  - CPW Women's Championship (1 time)
