= Niño Hamburguesa =

Mexican professional wrestler (born 1996)

Personal information
- Born: Ivan Flores; January 30, 1996 (age 30) Mexico

Professional wrestling career
- Ring name(s): Niño Hamburguesa; Pequeño Dollar; Tonina Cirio
- Billed height: 1.67 m (5 ft 5 1/2 in)
- Billed weight: 101 kg (223 lb)
- Trained by: Cynthia Moreno; Tony Cirio; Gran Apache
- Debut: 2009

Ivan Flores (born January 30, 1996) is a Mexican professional wrestler, better known by his ring name Niño Hamburguesa ("Hamburger Kid"). He is signed to WWE, where he performs on their sister promotion, Lucha Libre AAA Worldwide (AAA), and is a former AAA World Mixed Tag Team Champion with Big Mami.

== Professional wrestling career ==
=== Lucha Libre AAA Worldwide / WWE (2014–2026) ===
On June 19, 2017, in Nuevo Laredo, Hamburguesa and Mami competed for the AAA World Mixed Tag Team Championship defeating Venum and Lady Shani to win the title. On May 31, 2018, in Pachuca, Hamburguesa and Mami had their first defense defeating Villano III Jr. & La Hiedra. Their second defense took place on August 25 in Triplemanía XXVI who defeated Dinastía & Lady Maravilla, El Hijo del Vikingo & Vanilla Vargas and Angelikal & La Hiedra. Their third defense took place on March 16 in Rey de Reyes who defeated Maravilla and Villano III Jr., where the feud between Maravilla and Mami began. On August 3, 2019, in Triplemanía XXVII, Hamburguesa and Mami lost their titles to Maravilla and Villano, where it was a four-way tag team match, which also included the teams of Australian Suicide & Vanilla and Sammy Guevara & Scarlett Bordeaux in their fourth defense, ending their 775-day reign, being the second longest reign of the championship.

It was reported that Hamburguesa had signed with WWE on May 5, 2025 as part of WWE's acquisition of AAA. In March 2026, Hamburguesa was released from his contract with WWE and AAA due to an incident that was captured on video showing Hamburguesa delivering multiple elbow strikes to the face of a spectator.

Hamberguesa returned to AAA September 13, 2026 at night 2 of Triplemanía 34.

== Championships and accomplishments ==
- Lucha Libre AAA Worldwide
  - AAA World Mixed Tag Team Championship (1 time) – with Big Mami
  - Copa Triplemanía Regía (2019)
  - Copa Triplemanía XXX (2022, Tijuana)
  - Rey de Reyes (2025)
- Pro Wrestling Illustrated
  - Ranked No. 474 of the top 500 singles wrestlers in the PWI 500 in 2022
