= La Hiedra =

Mexican professional wrestler (born 1997)

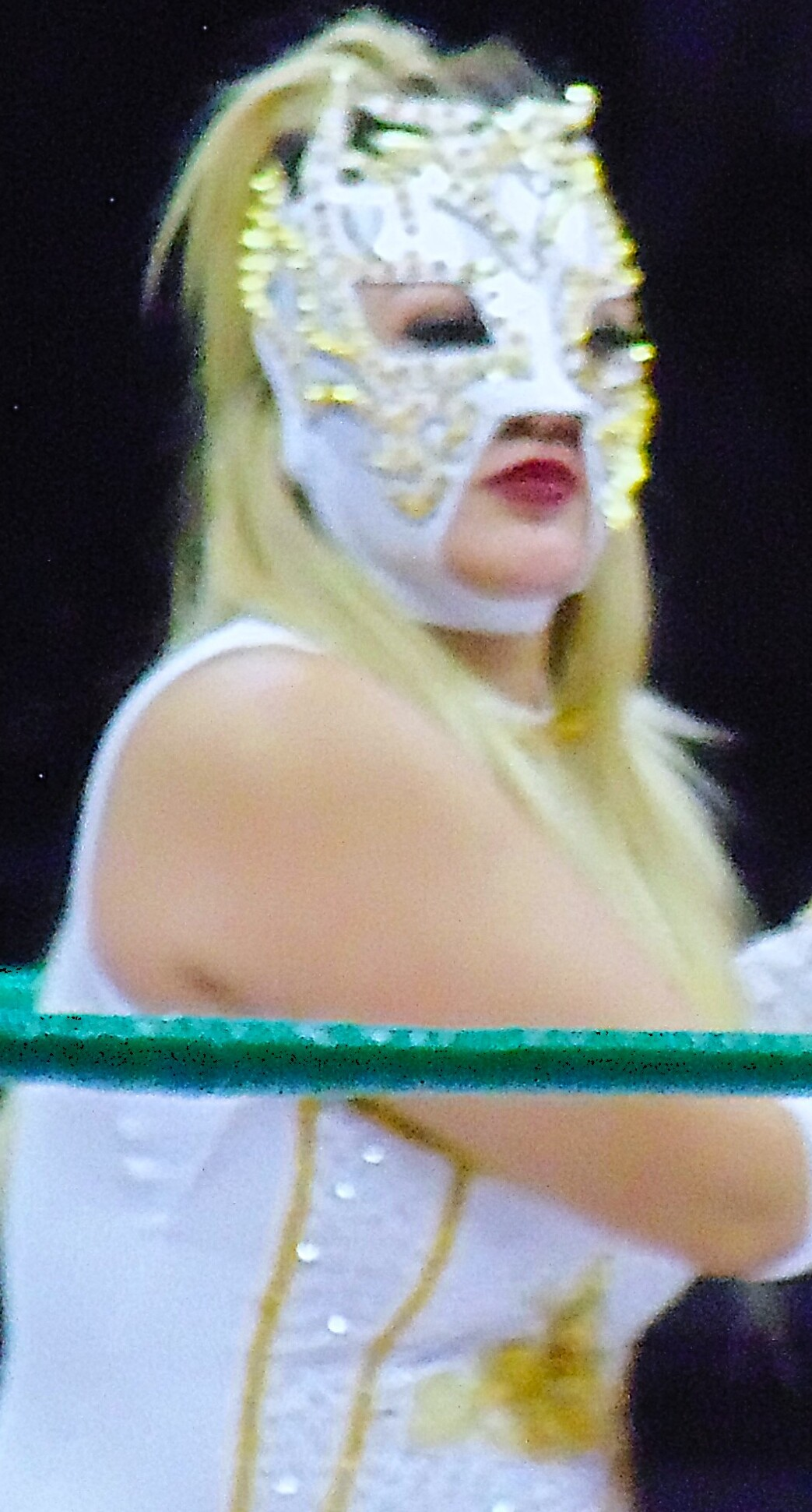
- La Hiedra in 2026

Personal information
- Born: Natalia Duran Bazadoni; 18 May 1997 (age 29) Nuevo Laredo, Tamaulipas, Mexico
- Spouse: La Parka III (m. 2025)
- Parent: Sangre Chicana (father)
- Relatives: Sangre Chicana Jr. (brother); Sangre Imperial (brother); Hijo de Sangre Chicana (brother); Lady Chicana (sister); Lluvia (sister); Águila Solitaria (uncle); Herodes (uncle); Águila Solitaria Jr. (cousin); Herodes Jr. (cousin)
- Family: The Alvarado family (by marriage)

Professional wrestling career
- Ring name: La Hiedra
- Billed height: 165 cm (5 ft 5 in)
- Billed weight: 80 kg (176 lb)
- Billed from: Nuevo Laredo, Tamaulipas, México
- Trained by: Kendor Jr. Laredo Kid; Sangre Chicana; Villano IV
- Debut: November 14, 2010

Natalia Durán Bazadoni, better known by her ring name La Hiedra (The Ivy), is a Mexican professional wrestler. She is signed to WWE, where she performs on their sister brand Lucha Libre AAA Worldwide (AAA) and is a member of Las Tóxicas. She is one-half of the current AAA World Mixed Tag Team Champions with Laredo Kid in their first reign as a team; it is Hiedra's second individual reign. She is a second-generation wrestler, the daughter of Sangre Chicana.

== Professional wrestling career ==
=== Independent circuit (2010–2014) ===
Bazadoni was originally trained by her father, Sangre Chicana, before making her professional wrestling debut on November 14, 2010. La Hiedra made her debut on the independent circuit where she defeated Amazona, La Hechicera and Rey Tornado. On September 16, 2011, at LLF Remembrance, La Hiedra was defeated by Lady Puma. On October 2, 2011, La Hiedra along with La Bandida was defeated by Princess Maya.

On November 6, 2011, La Hiedra made her debut in Promociones Cantu as part of AAA where she teamed with Mari Apache and Street Boy where they defeated Black Mamba, Lady Puma and La Hechicera.

=== Lucha Libre AAA Worldwide / WWE (2015–present) ===
On June 1, 2015, La Hiedra made her debut for AAA, one of Mexico's largest professional wrestling promotions. In her first AAA match she teamed up with El Hijo de Pirata Morgan, La Parka Negra and Taya Valkyrie, but lost to El Elegido, Faby Apache, Perseus, and Pimpinela Escarlata. La Hiedra, along with Lady Shani, Goya Kong and Lady Maravilla were all unsuccessful in their efforts to win the Reina de Reinas championship from Valkyrie at the Héroes Inmortales IX show, La Hiedra's first championship match in AAA. On November 6, 2015, she teamed up with Mamba, losing to Kong and Escarlata. On March 19, 2017, La Hiedra competed in a fight to be to #1 Contender for the AAA Reina de Reinas Championship, losing to Ayako Hamada.

On August 26 at Triplemanía XXVI, La Hiedra teamed up with Angelikal for the AAA World Mixed Tag Team Championship against El Hijo del Vikingo and Vanilla, Dinastía and Lady Maravilla, and Niño Hamburguesa and Big Mami, where they managed to retain their titles.

It was reported that La Hiedra had signed with WWE on May 5, 2025, as part of WWE's acquisition of AAA.

== Personal life ==
Bazadoni is the daughter of professional wrestler Andrés Durán Reyes, better known under the ring name Sangre Chicana ("Chicano Blood"), the sister of Sangre Chicana Jr. and half sister of Lluvia. Unlike her father and brother, she decided to work as a tecnico while her father was one of the most famous rulebreakers (also known as a rudo) of the 1980s. She is the niece of wrestler Herodes and the cousin of wrestler Herodes Jr.

== Championships and accomplishments ==
- DDT Pro-Wrestling
  - Ironman Heavymetalweight Championship (1 time)
- Lucha Libre AAA Worldwide
  - AAA World Mixed Tag Team Championship (2 times, current) – with Mr. Iguana (1), Laredo Kid (1, current)
  - AAA Northern Women's Championship (1 time)
  - AAA World Trios Championship (1 time) – with Rey Escorpión, Taurus and Texano Jr.
  - Showcenter Championship (2022)
- Pro Wrestling Illustrated
  - Ranked No. 257 of the top 500 singles wrestlers in the PWI 500 in 2021
  - Ranked No. 82 of the top 250 female singles wrestlers in the PWI Women's 250 in 2023
- Promociones EMW
  - EMW World Women's Championship (1 time)
- RGR Lucha Libre
  - RGR Women's Championship (1 time)
