= El Clon =

Mexican professional wrestler (born 1991)

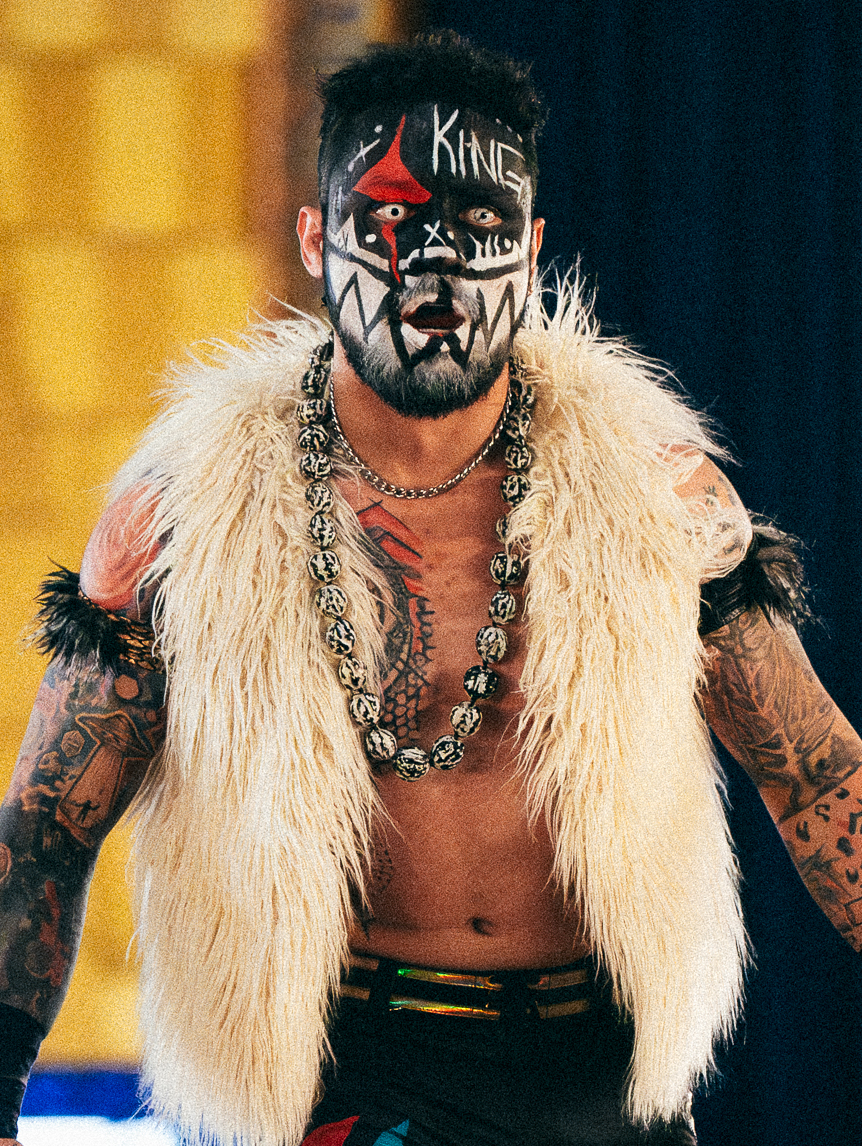
- González as Arez in December 2024

Personal information
- Born: Jonathan Saharawi Barragán González; October 20, 1991 (age 35) Mexico City, Mexico

Professional wrestling career
- Ring name(s): Aken; Ares; Arez; El Clon
- Billed height: 1.76 m (5 ft 9 1/2 in)
- Billed weight: 69 kg (152 lb)
- Trained by: Blue Demon Jr.; Cuchillo; Gran Apache; Skayde
- Debut: May 18, 2007

Jonathan Saharawi Barragán González (born October 20, 1991) is a Mexican professional wrestler. He is signed to All Elite Wrestling (AEW), where he performs under the ring name El Clon (Spanish for "The Clone") and is a member of the Don Callis Family. He also makes appearances for partner promotion Consejo Mundial de Lucha Libre (CMLL) as El Clon, and on the independent circuit under the ring name Arez.

González began his wrestling career in 2007 as Arez, wrestling for various independent promotions in Mexico. He was also part of the stable Los Indystrongtibles along with Belial and Impulso who were very well known and successful on the Mexican independent circuit between 2013 and 2018. In 2018, he signed with Lucha Libre AAA Worldwide (AAA), winning the AAA World Mixed Tag Team Championship, AAA World Tag Team Championship, and was also the inaugurals La Leyenda Azul Blue Demon Champion. Through AAA's working relationships, he also worked in the United States for Impact Wrestling and Major League Wrestling (MLW). He departed AAA in 2024. In 2025, he signed with AEW as a masked wrestler named El Clon.

As Arez, instead of wearing a mask, he wrestles in an advanced body and face painting inspired by the character Venom. As El Clon, he wears a mask and gear identical to Hologram but in darker colors.

== Professional wrestling career ==
=== Early career (2007–2018) ===
Starting in 2007, González mainly wrestled for various independent promotions in Mexico under the name Arez. Arez worked for and won championships in various promotions such as Lucha Memes, International Wrestling Revolution Group (IWRG), New Wrestling Generation (NWG), RIOT Wrestling Alliance, and Perros del Mal (PDM - where he voluntarily unmasked himself in 2012). From 2013 to 2018, Arez was a part of the stable Los Indystrongtibles along with Belial and Impulso. On the Mexican independent circuit, he developed a rivalry with Aramís, and they have fought several matches against each other.

=== Lucha Libre AAA Worldwide (2018–2024) ===
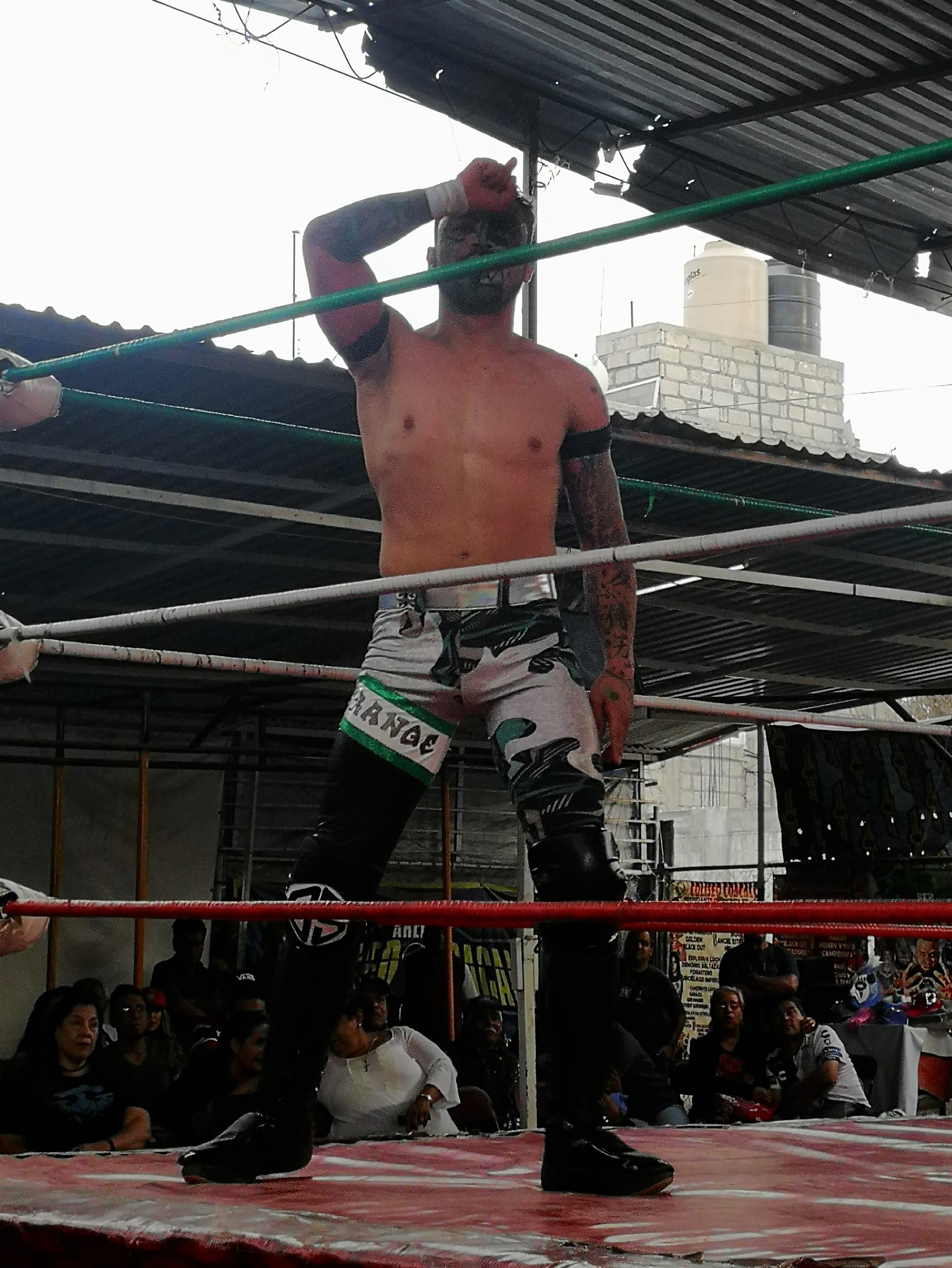
Arez in March 2020

On June 3, 2018, Arez made his debut for Lucha Libre AAA Worldwide (AAA) at Verano de Escándalo, teaming with Belial, Lady Maravilla, and Ultimo Maldito in a losing effort to Arkángel Divino, Dinastía, El Hijo del Vikingo, and Star Fire. On October 11, 2021, Tormenta and Arez won the AAA World Mixed Tag Team Championship. They lost the titles to Tay Conti and Sammy Guevara in a four-way match at Triplemanía XXX: Monterrey on April 30, 2022. On December 28, 2022, at Gira Aniversario XXX: Noche De Campeones, Arez defeated Taurus and Villano III Jr. to become the inaugural La Leyenda Azul Blue Demon Champion. On the May 20, 2023 episode of AAA on Space, Arez teamed with Komander to win the vacant AAA World Tag Team Championship, defeating the teams of Jack Evans and Myzteziz Jr., and Octagon Jr, and Rey Hours. They lost the titles to Nueva Generacion Dinamita (Forastero and Sanson) on the November 19 episode of AAA on Space. On January 6, 2024, at Retro, Arez teamed with Jessy Ventura, Lady Shani, and La Parkita to defeat El Elegido, Estrellita, Mini Charly Manson & Pimpinela Escarlata in what would be Arez's final match in AAA. On March 6, 2024, Arez left AAA.

=== Impact Wrestling (2019) ===
Arez made his Impact Wrestling debut on the September 20, 2019 episode of Impact! Wrestling, teaming with Australian Suicide and Toxin in a losing effort against The Rascalz (Dez, Trey, and Wentz).

=== Major League Wrestling (2021–2022) ===
Arez made his Major League Wrestling (MLW) debut on July 10, 2021, at Battle Riot III, where entered at number 8 in the Battle Riot match for a future MLW World Heavyweight Championship match, but was eliminated by E. J. Nduka. On October 2 at Fightland, Arez participated in a four-way match for the MLW World Middleweight Championship, but failed to win the title. On June 23, 2022, at Battle Riot IV, Arez entered the Battle Riot match at number 5, but was eliminated by Killer Kross.

=== All Elite Wrestling (2025–present) ===
In August 2025, All Elite Wrestling (AEW) began airing vignettes of a new masked wrestler called El Clon, who was a villainous doppelgänger to Hologram. It was later reported that Arez would be portraying the character. At the sixth anniversary episode of Dynamite on October 1, El Clon made his debut, where he assisted Kyle Fletcher retain his AEW TNT Championship against Orange Cassidy and joined the Don Callis Family.

El Clon made his in-ring debut on the January 3, 2026 episode of Collision, defeating Angélico. On the January 28 episode of Dynamite, El Clon unsuccessfully challenged Mark Briscoe for the TNT Championship. On July 26 at Redemption, El Clon competed in a six-way ladder match to earn a shot at the AEW International Championship which was won by "Speedball" Mike Bailey.

=== Consejo Mundial de Lucha Libre (2026–present) ===
El Clon made his Consejo Mundial de Lucha Libre (CMLL) debut on the February 14, 2026 episode of Sabados De Coliseo, teaming with Volador Jr. to defeat Ángel de Oro and Daniel Garcia. On the April 3 episode of Viernes Espectacular, El Clon teamed with Don Callis Family stablemates Hechicero and Volador Jr. to unsuccessfully challenge JetSpeed (Kevin Knight and "Speedball" Mike Bailey) and Místico for the AEW World Trios Championship. The following night at the 83rd Anniversary Show of Arena Coliseo, El Clon defeated Mistico and Soberano Jr. in a three-way match.

== Championships and accomplishments ==
- Desert Pro Wrestling
  - LPF Championship (1 time)
- International Wrestling Revolution Group
  - IWRG Intercontinental Middleweight Championship (1 time)
  - IWRG Intercontinental Trios Championship (1 time) – with Látigo and Toxin
- Lucha Libre AAA Worldwide
  - AAA World Mixed Tag Team Championship (1 time) – with Chik Tormenta
  - AAA World Tag Team Championship (1 time) – with Komander
  - La Leyenda Azul Blue Demon Championship (1 time, inaugural)
- New Wrestling Generation
  - NWG Master Championship (1 time)
- Perros del Mal
  - PDM Light Heavyweight Championship (1 time)
- Pro Wrestling Illustrated
  - Faction of the Year (2025) as part of the Don Callis Family
  - Ranked No. 166 of the top 500 singles wrestlers in the PWI 500 in 2021
- RIOT Wrestling Alliance
  - RIOT Championship (1 time, inaugural)
  - RIOT Title Tournament (2019)
- Xplosion Nacional de Lucha Libre
  - XNL World Championship (1 time)
- Unknown
  - Strong Style Championship

== Luchas de Apuestas record ==
| Winner (wager) | Loser (wager) | Location | Event | Date | Notes |
|---|---|---|---|---|---|
| Arez (mask) | Vértigo (Ecatepec) (mask) | Arena NWA - Ecatepec, Mexico State | NWA Show | November 25, 2011 | |
| Apolo Estrada Jr. (hair) | Arez (hair) | Ecatepec, Mexico State | House Show | September 29, 2013 | |
| Pentagon Jr. (mask) | Arez (hair & championship) | Arena Fusion - Ecatepec, Mexico State | AAA Show | March 30, 2014 | was a deathmatch |
| Arez (hair) | Black Sirius (mask) | Recinto Ferial - Tetla, Tlaxcala | Live event | July 25, 2015 | |
| Arez (hair) | Mike Segura (hair) | Arena Naucalpan - Naucalpan, Mexico State | Lucha Memes show | December 25, 2016 | (Note: Last man in a three team, three-way steel cage match that also included Aramis, Iron Kid, Alas de Acero, Sádico, Freelance, Belial and Impulso.) |
| Belial (mask) | Arez (hair) | Arena San Juan Pantitlan - Nezahualcoyotl, Mexico State | WMC Show | February 26, 2017 | (Note: this was a 3-way match with Impulso, who pinned Belial to escape) |
| Arez (hair) | Willy Banderas (hair) | Arena Roberto Paz - Guadalajara, Jalisco | NWA Show | February 16, 2024 | |
