= Lady Maravilla =

Mexican professional wrestler

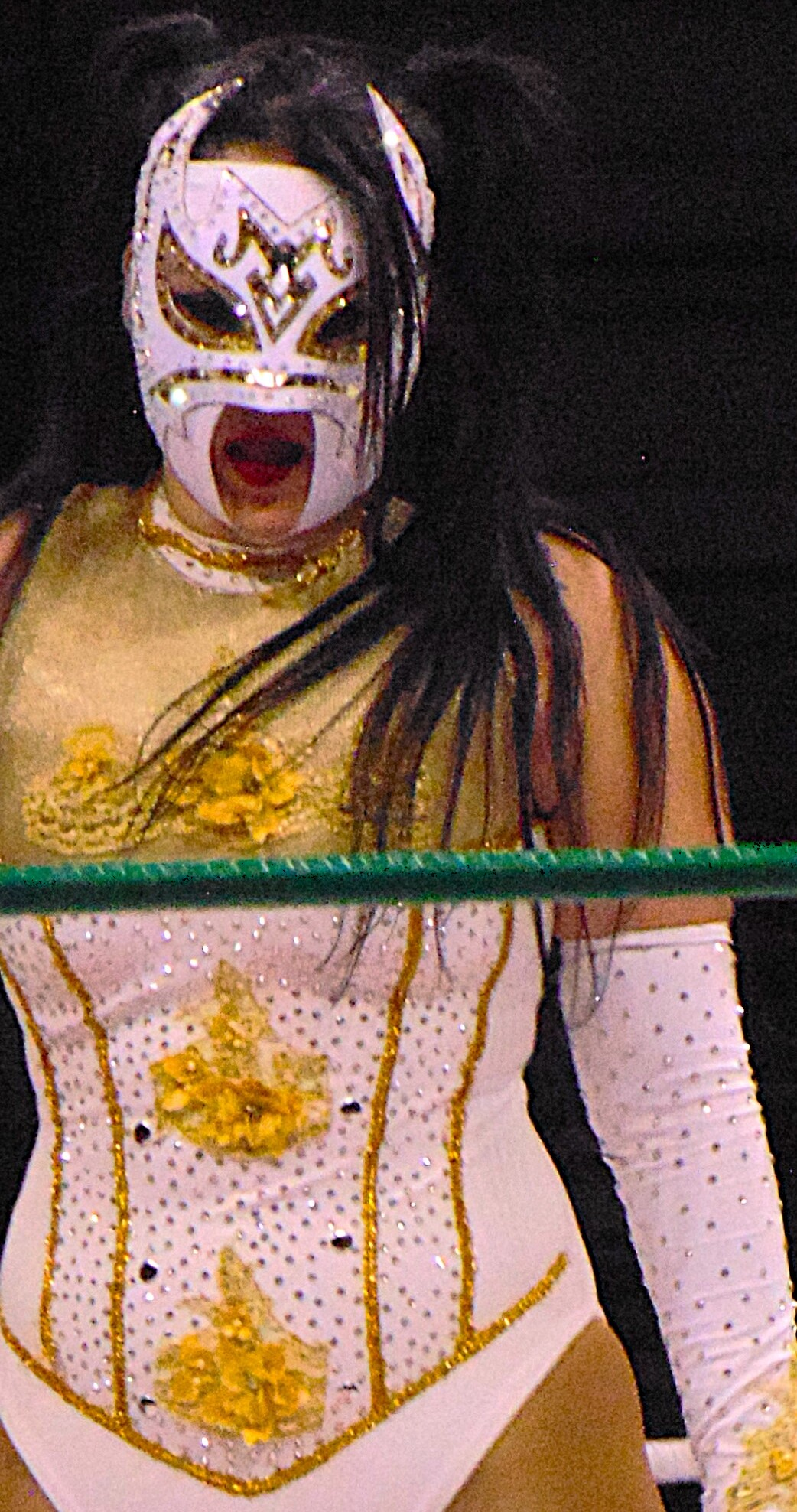
- Maravilla in 2026

Personal information
- Born: October 22, 1994 (age 31) Monterrey, Nuevo León, Mexico

Professional wrestling career
- Ring name(s): Lady Maravilla; Maravilla
- Billed height: 1.65 m (5 ft 5 in)
- Billed weight: 63 kg (139 lb)
- Billed from: Escobedo, Nuevo León, México
- Trained by: Símbolo; Golden Boy; Rey Demonio Jr. Rosa Salvaje
- Debut: February 6, 2009

Lady Maravilla (born October 22, 1994), is a Mexican professional wrestler. She is signed to WWE, where she performs on their sister brand Lucha Libre AAA Worldwide (AAA) under the ring name Maravilla. She is a member of Las Toxicás. She is also a former one-time AAA World Mixed Tag Team Champion with Villano III Jr.. Her real name is not a matter of public record as is often the case with masked wrestlers in Mexico.

== Professional wrestling career ==
=== Lucha Libre AAA Worldwide (2015–2016,2018) ===
On October 4, Maravilla made her debut at AAA in Heroes Inmortales IX in Five-way match for the AAA Reina de Reinas Championship against Goya Kong, Lady Shani, La Hiedra and Taya, failed to win the briefcase. On January 22, Maravilla made her second appearance in Guerra de Titanes teaming with Faby Apache and Goya Kong where they defeated against Lady Shani, Keira and Taya.

=== Consejo Mundial de Lucha Libre (2017–2018) ===
On July 21, Maravilla made her debut at Consejo Mundial de Lucha Libre (CMLL) for the Copa Natalia Vazquez Match against Princesa Sugehit, Dalys la Caribeña, Estrellita, La Amapola, La Comandante, La Seductora, La Silueta, La Vaquerita, Marcela, La Metalica, Sanely, Skadi and Zeuxis, where it was won by Sugehit.

On May 29, Maravilla announced her departure from CMLL and her participation in Verano de Escándalo, where she would return to the AAA. According to her statement, Maravilla says that she would only be working by dates in AAA, since she will be a wrestler independent.

=== WWE (2025–present) ===
On June 4, Maravilla returned to appear in Verano de Escándalo teaming with Arez, Belial and Ultimo Maldito in a tag team match, where they defeated El Hijo del Vikingo, Arkangel Divino, Dinastía and Star Fire. On July 21 in AAA vs. Elite teaming with Keyra and Zeuxis as representative of Liga Elite they were defeated before the Team AAA (Faby Apache, La Hiedra and Vanilla Vargas). On August 26 at Triplemanía XXVI, Maravilla teamed up with Dinastía for the AAA World Mixed Tag Team Championship against El Hijo del Vikingo and Vanilla Vargas, Angelikal and La Hiedra and Niño Hamburguesa and Big Mami, where they managed to retain their titles.

Maravilla made a special appearance on the January 11, 2019 edition of Impact Wrestling Xplosion, which was taped January 11–12, 2019 at Mexico City's Frontón México Entertainment Center, was defeated by Tessa Blanchard.

On August 3 at Triplemanía XXVII, Maravilla teamed up with Villano III Jr. for the AAA World Mixed Tag Team Championship who managed to defeat Australian Suicide and Vanilla Vargas, Niño Hamburguesa and Big Mami and Sammy Guevara and Scarlett Bordeaux, to be crowned as new champions, being her first AAA championship in her career. On October 19 at Héroes Inmortales XIII, Maravilla along with Villano III Jr. had their first defense defeating Keyra and Látigo and her rivals Big Mami & Niño Hamburguesa.

It was reported that Maravilla had signed with WWE on May 5, 2025 as part of WWE's acquisition of AAA.

== Championships and accomplishments ==
- Pro Wrestling Illustrated
  - Ranked No. 81 of the top 100 female wrestlers in the PWI Female 100 in 2019
- Promociones HUMO
  - HUMO Women's Championship (1 time)
- Promoluchas
  - Promoluchas Women's Championship (1 time)
- International Wrestling Revolution Group
  - IWRG Intercontinental Women's Championship (1 time)
- Lucha Libre AAA Worldwide
  - AAA World Mixed Tag Team Championship (1 time) – with Villano III Jr.

== Luchas de Apuestas record ==
Winner (wager)	Loser (wager)	Location	Event	Date	Notes
Lady Maravilla (mask)	Dulce Kanela (hair)	Monterrey, Nuevo León	House show	March 14, 2017	
Big Mami (hair)	Lady Maravilla (hair)	Ciudad Madero, Tamaulipas, Mexico	Guerra de Titanes	December 14, 2019	
