= WWE Worlds Collide =

WWE streaming event series

- WWE Worlds Collide logo
- Promotions: WWE (2019–present); Lucha Libre AAA Worldwide (2025–present)
- Brands: NXT (2019–2020, 2022, 2025–present); Raw (2019, 2025–present); SmackDown (2019, 2025–present); NXT UK (2019–2020, 2022); 205 Live (2019)
- First event: 2019

Worlds Collide is a professional wrestling event series co-produced by WWE, an American-based professional wrestling promotion, and Lucha Libre AAA Worldwide (AAA), a Mexican-based subsidiary of WWE. The first event was held by WWE in 2019 with the concept being interbrand competition between WWE's various brand divisions. Although the event has been held primarily for WWE's developmental brand, NXT, other brands have also been featured. The event was put on hiatus after the 2020 event but returned in 2022. After another three-year hiatus, the event returned in June 2025 and was held with Mexico's AAA, which WWE acquired in April 2025 with subsequent events held between WWE and AAA.

The inaugural 2019 event was held as a tournament and featured wrestlers from NXT, NXT UK, and 205 Live. In April that year, a four-episode streaming television series titled WWE Worlds Collide aired. In addition to the other three brands, this series also featured wrestlers from WWE's main roster brands, Raw and SmackDown. A second singular event was then held in 2020, but only featured wrestlers from NXT and NXT UK. The 2022 event was again held primarily for NXT and NXT UK, but also with a few wrestlers from Raw and SmackDown taking part; this was also the final WWE event for NXT UK (205 Live was also dissolved in early 2022). The 2025 event featured wrestlers from Raw, SmackDown, NXT, and AAA, as well as WWE and AAA partner promotion Total Nonstop Action Wrestling.

== History ==
In early January 2019, the American professional wrestling promotion WWE announced an interbrand tournament to take place during the weekend of that year's Royal Rumble event, and it would stream on the WWE Network. The tournament was a two-day event, held on January 26 and 27 at the Phoenix Convention Center in Phoenix, Arizona, and aired on tape delay as a single broadcast on February 2. The event hosted a 15-man single-elimination tournament, called the Worlds Collide Tournament, which was evenly divided between the NXT, NXT UK, and 205 Live brands. The winner of the tournament received a future match for a championship of their choice, with the choices being the NXT Championship, the NXT North American Championship, NXT UK's WWE United Kingdom Championship, and 205 Live's WWE Cruiserweight Championship—the latter only being an option if the winner was within the 205 lb. weight limit.

On March 28, 2019, WWE announced that Worlds Collide would return during April's WrestleMania Axxess festival. In addition to the three brands previously featured at the Worlds Collide special, wrestlers from the Raw and SmackDown brands would also participate in the events. On April 9, WWE announced that these events would air as a four-episode streaming television series on the WWE Network titled WWE Worlds Collide, starting on April 14.

During WWE's Royal Rumble 2020 weekend announcements, WWE revealed that a second singular Worlds Collide event would be livestreamed on the WWE Network on January 25, 2020, and broadcast from the Toyota Center in Houston, Texas, though unlike the first event, it would only feature the NXT and NXT UK brands and not also 205 Live (which would cease operations in February 2022). Also unlike the first event, there was not a Worlds Collide Tournament with a future championship opportunity at stake. Instead, the card's matches were interbrand matches pitting wrestlers from NXT against those from NXT UK.

Worlds Collide was then put on hiatus due to the COVID-19 pandemic. In October 2021, the company revealed their event calendar for 2022, and Worlds Collide was not included. Prior to this, NXT underwent a restructuring, being rebranded as "NXT 2.0", reverting to a developmental territory for WWE. However, on August 18, 2022, WWE announced the return of Worlds Collide, scheduled for September 4, and it would primarily feature NXT and NXT UK. The announcement also confirmed that the 2022 Worlds Collide would be the final event for NXT UK; following the event, the brand took a hiatus with plans to eventually relaunch as NXT Europe. At the 2022 event, all of NXT UK's championships (except the NXT UK Heritage Cup) were unified into their respective NXT championship counterparts. In addition to the WWE Network in international markets, it was available to livestream on Peacock in the United States (as the American WWE Network merged under Peacock in March 2021). The 2022 event was also the final major event for NXT in which the brand was referred to as "NXT 2.0", as shortly after the event, the "2.0" moniker was dropped.

On April 19, 2025, after a three-year hiatus, WWE announced the return of Worlds Collide for NXT, scheduled for Saturday, June 7, 2025, at the Kia Forum in Inglewood, California. The event was held in collaboration with the Mexican promotion Lucha Libre AAA Worldwide (AAA) which WWE revealed it had acquired shortly after the announcement of the June 2025 Worlds Collide. It was held as part of the 2025 Money in the Bank weekend, held the same day prior to that event, which took place at Inglewood's Intuit Dome. This was the first Worlds Collide to livestream on YouTube in most international markets, following the merger of the WWE Network under Netflix in January 2025 in the areas. The event also had involvement from wrestlers from WWE's Raw and SmackDown brands, as well as a couple of wrestlers from WWE and AAA partner promotion Total Nonstop Action Wrestling (TNA).

== Events ==
| # | Event | Brands | Date | City | Venue | Main event | Ref. |
|---|---|---|---|---|---|---|---|
| 1 | Worlds Collide (2019) | WWE: NXT; NXT UK; 205 Live | January 26–27, 2019 (aired February 2, 2019) | Phoenix, Arizona | Phoenix Convention Center | Velveteen Dream (NXT) vs. Tyler Bate (NXT UK) in the Worlds Collide tournament final match | |
| – | Worlds Collide (weekly series) | WWE: Raw; SmackDown; NXT; NXT UK; 205 Live | April 6–7, 2019 (aired April 14–May 1, 2019) | Brooklyn, New York | Pier 12 | April 14: Tyler Breeze (Raw) vs. Roderick Strong (NXT) | |
| – | Worlds Collide (weekly series) | WWE: Raw; SmackDown; NXT; NXT UK; 205 Live | April 6–7, 2019 (aired April 14–May 1, 2019) | Brooklyn, New York | Pier 12 | April 17: Jordan Devlin (NXT UK) vs. Akira Tozawa (205 Live) | |
| – | Worlds Collide (weekly series) | WWE: Raw; SmackDown; NXT; NXT UK; 205 Live | April 6–7, 2019 (aired April 14–May 1, 2019) | Brooklyn, New York | Pier 12 | April 24: Nikki Cross (SmackDown) vs. Bianca Belair (NXT) vs. Toni Storm (NXT UK) in a triple threat match | |
| – | Worlds Collide (weekly series) | WWE: Raw; SmackDown; NXT; NXT UK; 205 Live | April 6–7, 2019 (aired April 14–May 1, 2019) | Brooklyn, New York | Pier 12 | May 1: 20-man interbrand battle royal | |
| 2 | Worlds Collide (2020) | WWE: NXT; NXT UK | January 25, 2020 | Houston, Texas | Toyota Center | NXT's The Undisputed Era (Adam Cole, Kyle O'Reilly, Bobby Fish, and Roderick Strong) vs. NXT UK's Imperium (Walter, Fabian Aichner, Marcel Barthel, and Alexander Wolfe) | |
| 3 | Worlds Collide (2022) | WWE: NXT; NXT UK | September 4, 2022 | Orlando, Florida | WWE Performance Center | Bron Breakker (NXT) vs. Tyler Bate (NXT UK) to unify the NXT Championship and NXT United Kingdom Championship | |
| 4 | Worlds Collide (June 2025) | AAA; WWE: Raw; SmackDown; NXT | June 7, 2025 | Inglewood, California | Kia Forum | El Hijo del Vikingo (c) vs. Chad Gable for the AAA Mega Championship | |
| 5 | Worlds Collide (September 2025) | AAA; WWE: Raw; SmackDown; NXT | September 12, 2025 | Paradise, Nevada | Thomas & Mack Center | El Hijo del Vikingo (c) vs. Dominik Mysterio for the AAA Mega Championship | |
| 6 | Worlds Collide (September 2026) | AAA; WWE: Raw; SmackDown; NXT | September 26, 2026 (aired: September 30) | Rosemont, Illinois | Allstate Arena | CM Punk, Rey Mysterio, and El Grande Americano vs. Omos, Dominik Mysterio, and JD McDonagh | |
| 7 | Worlds Collide (December 2026) | AAA; WWE: Raw; SmackDown; NXT | December 15, 2026 | Osceola County, Florida | ESPN Wide World of Sports Complex | | |
(c) – refers to the champion(s) heading into the match
