= Worlds Collide (2020) =

WWE Network event

- Promotional poster featuring various NXT and NXT UK wrestlers
- Promotion: WWE
- Brand(s): NXT; NXT UK
- Date: January 25, 2020
- City: Houston, Texas
- Venue: Toyota Center

WWE event chronology
← Previous; NXT UK TakeOver: Blackpool II	Next → Royal Rumble

Worlds Collide chronology
← Previous; 2019	Next → 2022

The 2020 Worlds Collide was a professional wrestling livestreaming event produced by WWE, held for wrestlers from the promotion's NXT and NXT UK brand divisions. It was the second Worlds Collide and took place on January 25, 2020, at the Toyota Center in Houston, Texas, and it aired exclusively on the WWE Network. The event was based around direct competition between wrestlers from the two brands.

Six matches were contested at the event, including one on the Kickoff pre-show. In the main event, NXT UK's Imperium (Walter, Fabian Aichner, Marcel Barthel, and Alexander Wolfe) defeated NXT's The Undisputed Era (Adam Cole, Kyle O'Reilly, Bobby Fish, and Roderick Strong) in an eight-man tag team match.

== Production ==
=== Background ===
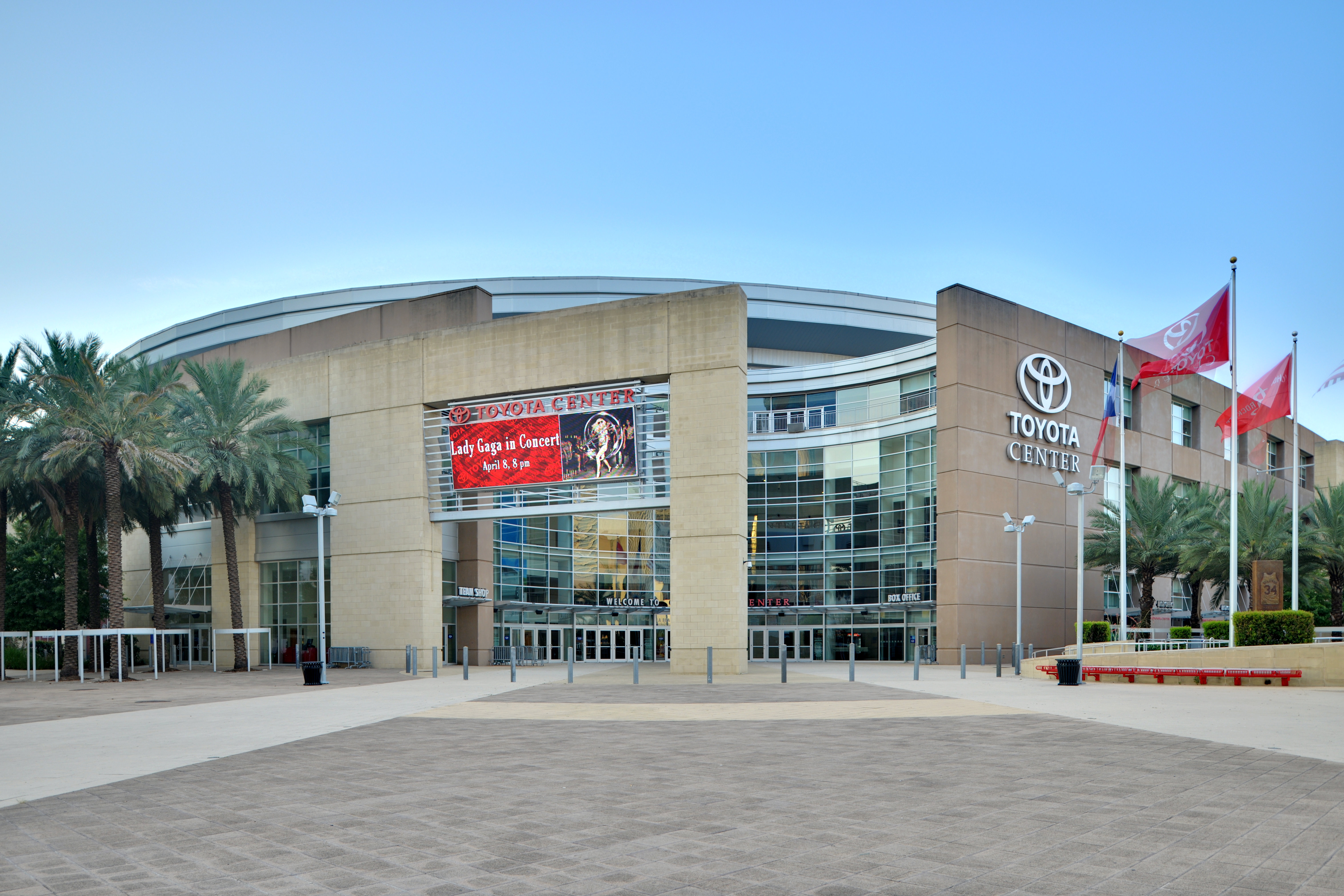
The second Worlds Collide was held at the Toyota Center in Houston, Texas.

Worlds Collide is a series of professional wrestling shows that began in January 2019, when WWE held an interbrand tournament featuring wrestlers from the NXT, NXT UK, and 205 Live brands. The "Worlds Collide" name was subsequently adopted for a WWE Network series that aired in April 2019. During the Royal Rumble 2020 weekend announcements, WWE revealed that a second Worlds Collide event would air live on the WWE Network on January 25, 2020, and be held at the Toyota Center in Houston, Texas, but unlike the previous year's event, it would only feature the NXT and NXT UK brands and not also 205 Live. Also unlike the 2019 event, there was not a Worlds Collide Tournament with a future championship opportunity at stake. Instead, the card's matches were interbrand matches pitting wrestlers from NXT against those from NXT UK.

=== Storylines ===
The card included six matches that resulted from scripted storylines. Results were predetermined by WWE's writers on the NXT and NXT UK brands, while storylines were produced on WWE's weekly television shows, NXT and NXT UK.

== Event ==
Other on-screen personnel
Role:	Name:
Commentators	Tom Phillips
Commentators	Nigel McGuinness
Spanish commentators	Carlos Cabrera
Spanish commentators	Marcelo Rodríguez
Ring announcers	Alicia Taylor
Ring announcers	Andy Shepherd
Referees	Drake Wuertz
Referees	Darryl Sharma
Referees	D. A. Brewer
Interviewer	Cathy Kelley
Pre-show panel	Charly Caruso
Pre-show panel	Sam Roberts
Pre-show panel	Andy Shepherd

=== Pre-Show ===
On the pre-show, Mia Yim took on Kay Lee Ray. In the end, Ray rolled up Yim while grabbing the ropes to win.

=== Preliminary matches ===
The actual pay-per-view opened with Ilja Dragunov facing Finn Bálor. In the end, Bálor performed the 1916 DDT to win the match.

Next, Angel Garza defended the NXT Cruiserweight Championship against Isaiah "Swerve" Scott, Jordan Devlin, and Travis Banks in a fatal four-way match. In the end, Garza performed the Wing Clipper on Scott, however, Devlin broke up the pin by delivering a headbutt to Garza and threw him out of the ring. Devlin then performed the Devlin Side on Scott and pinned him to win the championship for the first time.

After that, Moustache Mountain (Trent Seven and Tyler Bate) faced #DIY (Johnny Gargano and Tommaso Ciampa). In the end, Ciampa and Gargano performed their old tag finisher, Meeting in the Middle (running knee smash/superkick combo) on Seven to win the match. After the match, both teams shook hands and hugged, with Ciampa and Gargano raising Bate's and Seven's hands afterward.

The penultimate match was Rhea Ripley defending the NXT Women's Championship against Toni Storm. In the end, after Storm missed the Frog splash, Ripley performed the Riptide to retain the championship.

=== Main event ===
In the main event, Imperium (NXT UK Champion Walter, Fabian Aichner, Marcel Barthel, and Alexander Wolfe) defeated The Undisputed Era (NXT Champion Adam Cole, NXT Tag Team Champions Kyle O'Reilly and Bobby Fish, and Roderick Strong) in an eight-man tag team match despite being outnumbered 4-3 after Wolfe suffered an injury early in the match.

== Aftermath ==
A Worlds Collide event was not held in 2021, but it was announced to return in 2022. The 2022 event was also the first Worlds Collide event to air on Peacock after the American version of the WWE Network merged under Peacock in March 2021.

== Results ==
No.	Results	Stipulations	Times
1^{P}	Kay Lee Ray defeated Mia Yim by pinfall	Singles match	9:15
2	Finn Bálor defeated Ilja Dragunov by pinfall	Singles match	14:00
3	Jordan Devlin defeated Angel Garza (c), Isaiah "Swerve" Scott, and Travis Banks by pinfall	Fatal four-way match for the NXT Cruiserweight Championship	12:05
4	#DIY (Johnny Gargano and Tommaso Ciampa) defeated Moustache Mountain (Trent Seven and Tyler Bate) by pinfall	Tag team match	22:55
5	Rhea Ripley (c) defeated Toni Storm by pinfall	Singles match for the NXT Women's Championship	10:15
6	Imperium (Walter, Fabian Aichner, Marcel Barthel, and Alexander Wolfe) defeated The Undisputed Era (Adam Cole, Kyle O'Reilly, Bobby Fish, and Roderick Strong) by pinfall	Eight-man tag team match	29:50
(c) / – the champion(s) heading into the match; P / – the match was broadcast on the pre-show
