= Worlds Collide: Doomsday =

2026 WWE and AAA pro wrestling event

- The official logo
- Promotion(s): WWE; Lucha Libre AAA Worldwide
- Brand(s): Raw; SmackDown; NXT
- Date: December 15, 2026
- City: Kissimmee, Florida
- Venue: ESPN Wide World of Sports Complex

Major events chronology
| ← Previous; WWE: NXT TLC: Tables, Ladders & Chairs; AAA: Héroes Inmortales | Next → WWE: Royal Rumble; AAA: Guerra de Titanes |

Worlds Collide chronology
| ← Previous; September 2026 | Next → — |

Worlds Collide: Doomsday is an upcoming 2026 professional wrestling livestreaming event and supercard co-produced by the American promotion WWE and its Mexican sister promotion Lucha Libre AAA Worldwide (AAA). It will be the seventh Worlds Collide, and the fourth with AAA, and will be held for wrestlers from WWE's Raw, SmackDown, and NXT brand divisions, and those from AAA. It is scheduled to take place on Tuesday, December 15, 2026, at the ESPN Wide World of Sports Complex within Walt Disney World in Kissimmee, Florida, and will serve as a crossover with the Marvel Studios superhero film, Avengers: Doomsday, ahead of its theatrical release on December 18. It will be based around direct competition between wrestlers from the two promotions.

== Production ==
=== Background ===
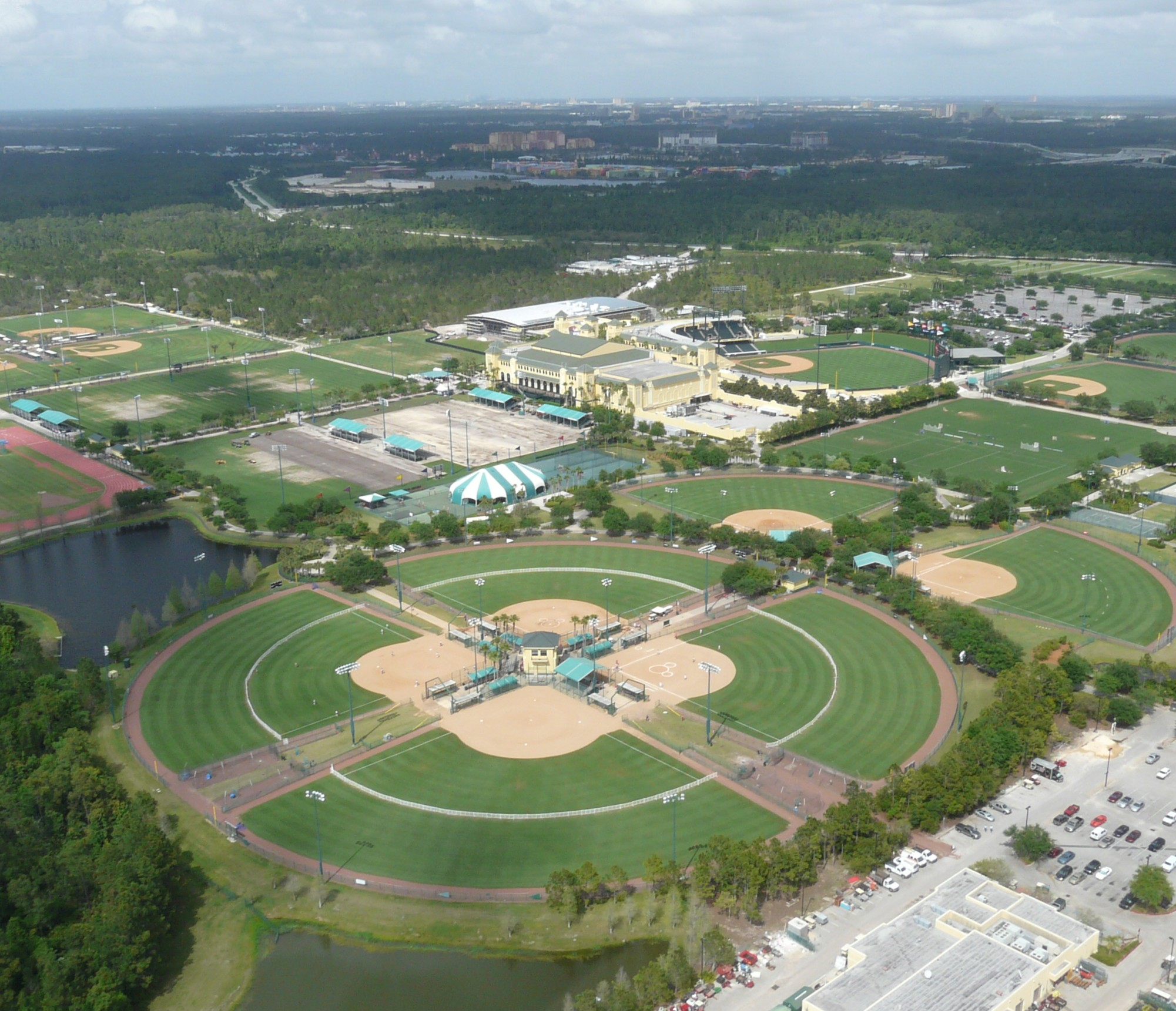
The seventh Worlds Collide will take place at the ESPN Wide World of Sports Complex within Walt Disney World in Kissimmee, Florida.

Worlds Collide is a series of professional wrestling premium live events (PLE) produced by the American promotion WWE since 2019 and feature direct competition between wrestlers from the promotion's various brands. Following the acquisition of the Mexican promotion Lucha Libre AAA Worldwide (AAA) in 2025, Worlds Collide has since also involved AAA beginning with the June 2025 event.

On the November 2, 2026, episode of Monday Night Raw, WWE ambassador John Cena, who retired from in-ring competition in December 2025, formally announced that his namesake television special, the John Cena Classic, would take place from the ESPN Wide World of Sports Complex within Walt Disney World in Kissimmee, Florida on December 14. The following day, WWE and The Walt Disney Company announced that on Tuesday, December 15, the day after the John Cena Classic, the same venue would host the seventh Worlds Collide event, and fourth with AAA. It was also revealed that it would be a crossover with the Marvel Studios film Avengers: Doomsday ahead of its release on December 18, with the event titled Worlds Collide: Doomsday, featuring wrestlers from WWE's main roster brands, Raw and SmackDown, as well as the developmental brand NXT and AAA itself. In a joint press statement, it was said that the collaboration would "bring together the companies' renowned storytelling to create a landmark crossover moment for Disney and WWE fans alike". AAA had previously maintained a relationship with Marvel Comics, which saw a series of "Marvel Lucha Libre Edition exhibition matches" held at AAA's major events to promote the Marvel Lucha Libre Edition: The Origin of the Mask program on Disney+.

=== Storylines ===
The event will include professional wrestling matches that resulted from scripted storylines. Results are predetermined by writers of the participating promotions, while storylines are produced on WWE's weekly television programs, Monday Night Raw, Friday Night SmackDown, Tuesday's NXT, and Saturday's Lucha Libre AAA, as well as other WWE and AAA events.
