= Worlds Collide (September 2026) =

WWE and AAA professional wrestling event

Worlds Collide Los Mundos Chocan (Spanish)
- Promotional poster featuring various WWE and AAA wrestlers
- Promotion(s): WWE; Lucha Libre AAA Worldwide
- Brand(s): Raw; SmackDown; NXT
- Date: September 26, 2026 (aired September 30, 2026)
- City: Rosemont, Illinois
- Venue: Allstate Arena
- Attendance: 13,979

Pay-per-view chronology
← Previous; WWE: Sunday Night's Main Event; AAA: Triplemanía 34	Next → WWE: Money in the Bank AAA: Héroes Inmortales

Worlds Collide chronology
← Previous; September 2025	Next → Doomsday (December 2026)

The September 2026 Worlds Collide, also promoted as Worlds Collide: Chicago and Los Mundos Chocan (Spanish for "Worlds Collide"), was a professional wrestling livestreaming event and supercard co-produced by the American promotion WWE and its Mexican sister promotion Lucha Libre AAA Worldwide (AAA). It was the sixth Worlds Collide, and the third with AAA, and was held for wrestlers from WWE's Raw, SmackDown, and NXT brand divisions, and those from AAA. It took place on Saturday, September 26, 2026, at the Allstate Arena in the Chicago suburb of Rosemont, Illinois, and aired on tape delay on Wednesday, September 30, on WWE's YouTube channel. It was based around direct competition between wrestlers from the two promotions.

Seven matches were contested at the event. In the main event, SmackDown's CM Punk, Raw wrestler and AAA General Manager Rey Mysterio, and AAA Mega Champion El Grande Americano defeated AAA's Omos and Raw's The Judgment Day (Dominik Mysterio, and JD McDonagh) in a six-man tag team match. In other prominent matches, AAA's La Catalina defeated Raw's Roxanne Perez to retain the AAA Reina de Reinas Championship and AAA's Mini Vikingo defeated SmackDown's Axiom, Raw's Je'Von Evans, and NXT's EK Prosper in a 4-Way, 4-Brand Cruiserweight Contenders match to become the number one contender for the AAA World Cruiserweight Championship.

The event went head-to-head twice against rival American company All Elite Wrestling (AEW). The day the event was taped on September 26, it occurred simultaneously with AEW's pay-per-view event, All Out, which was also held in the Chicago area, and when Worlds Collide was broadcast on September 30, it aired against "A Tribute to Pac", a special episode of the weekly series AEW Dynamite. It also aired against WWE's own Wednesday night program, Evolve.

== Production ==
=== Background ===
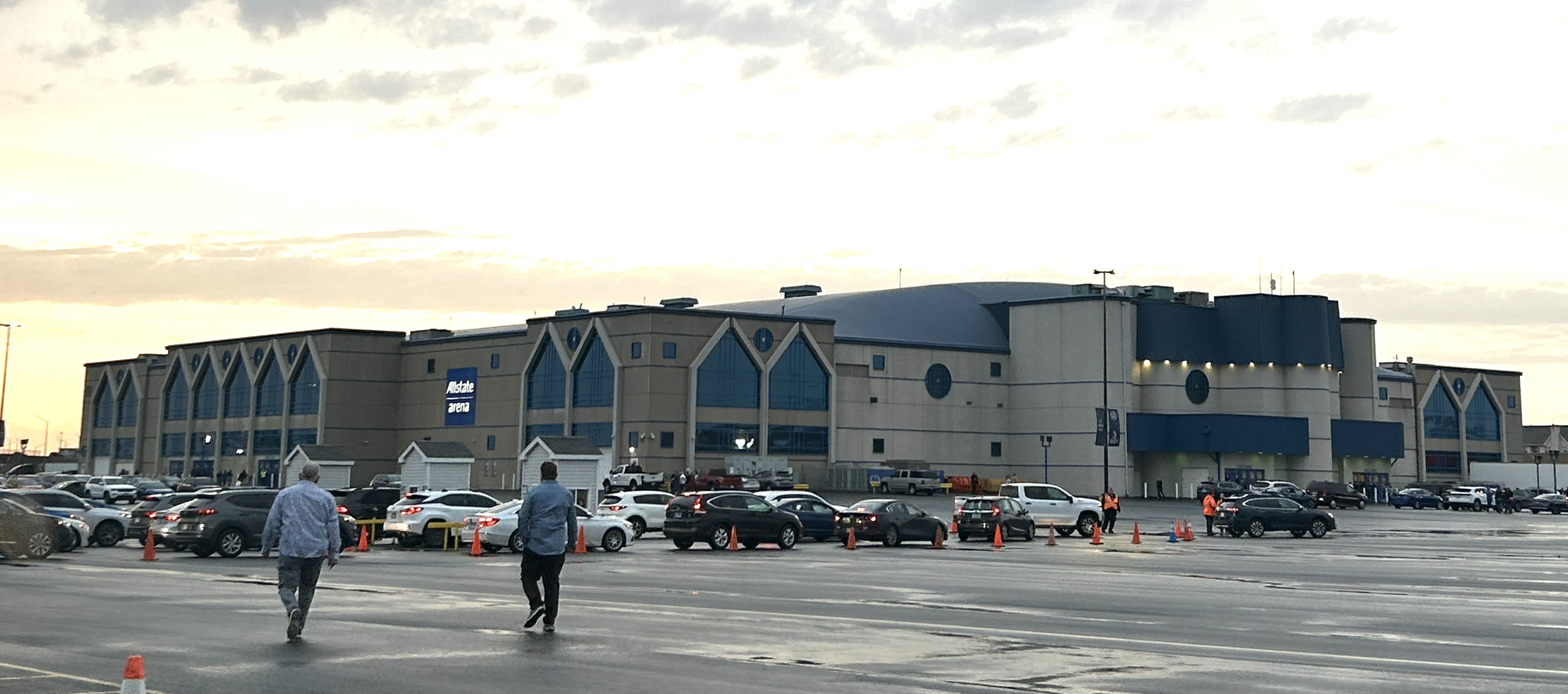
The sixth Worlds Collide took place at the Allstate Arena in the Chicago suburb of Rosemont, Illinois.

A Spanish-language promotional graphic of the event's match card published on X by AAA commentator José Manuel Guillén.

Worlds Collide is a series of professional wrestling premium live events (PLE) produced by the American promotion WWE since 2019 and feature direct competition between wrestlers from the promotion's various brands. Following the acquisition of the Mexican promotion Lucha Libre AAA Worldwide (AAA) in 2025, Worlds Collide has since also involved AAA beginning with the June 2025 event.

On July 16, 2026, WWE announced a series of events from late September to early October, including Worlds Collide. The sixth Worlds Collide, and the third with AAA, was scheduled to take place on Saturday, September 26, 2026, at the Allstate Arena in the Chicago suburb of Rosemont, Illinois, with the event also promoted as Los Mundos Chocan (Spanish for "Worlds Collide"). It was held on the same day as All Elite Wrestling (AEW)'s pay-per-view event, All Out, which took place at the nearby Now Arena in Hoffman Estates, Illinois, marking direct WWE–AEW competition in the Chicagoland area. On September 25, WWE announced that the event would not air live and instead, it would air on tape delay on Wednesday, September 30, on WWE's YouTube channel, which put it head-to-head against "A Tribute to Pac", a live special episode of AEW Dynamite; Pac, who previously wrestled in WWE as Neville from 2012 to 2018, died on September 27, a day after wrestling at All Out.

Chicago native and SmackDown wrestler CM Punk was confirmed to appear at the event. On the September 19 episode of Lucha Libre AAA, AAA General Manager Rey Mysterio revealed the match card and announced that Raw wrestler Oba Femi would appear at Worlds Collide.

=== Storylines ===
The event included seven matches that resulted from scripted storylines. Results were predetermined by writers of the participating promotions, while storylines were produced on WWE's weekly television programs, Raw, SmackDown, NXT, and Lucha Libre AAA, as well as at other WWE and AAA events.

On September 3, AAA announced a fatal four-way match involving Roxanne Perez, Faby Apache, Nattie, and La Hiedra at Night 1 of Triplemanía 34 for the right to challenge for the AAA Reina de Reinas Championship at Worlds Collide. The winner of that match would challenge the winner of the Reina de Reinas Championship match between Flammer and La Catalina at Night 2 of Triplemanía. The number one contender's fatal four-way match at Night 1 of Triplemanía 34 was won by Perez, and at Night 2, Catalina ended Flammer's 1,128-day reign as champion to win the title.

== Event ==
Other on-screen personnel
Role	Name
Commentators	Corey Graves
Commentators	John "Bradshaw" Layfield
Spanish commentators	José Manuel Guillén
Spanish commentators	Roberto Figueroa
Ring announcer	Lillian Garcia
Referees	Adrian Butler

=== Preliminary matches ===
The event opened with the team of AAA's AAA Latin American Champion La Parka, Mr. Iguana, Adelicious, and Mascarita Sagrada versus the team of NXT's The Vanity Project (Brad Baylor, Ricky Smokes, and Myka Lockwood) and AAA's Mini Abismo Negro, accompanied by Jackson Drake. When Lockwood tried to attack Sagrada, Adelicious stopped her before diving to the outside onto Lockwood. Iguana then followed by diving to the outside onto his opponents, which was quickly followed by another dive by Parka. After Sagrada escaped a pinfall attempt by Negro, Sagrada retaliated and then pinned Negro to gain the victory.

The next match was between Raw's Dragon Lee and AAA's Jack Cartwheel. Lee countered a dive by Cartwheel by raising his knees up to make Cartwheel land on his knees. Lee then executed the "Operation Dragon" on Cartwheel, in which Lee backflipped over Cartwheel while grabbing his neck to drive his head backwards down to the mat, before pinning Cartwheel to get the victory.

The third match featured SmackDown's WWE Women's Tag Team Champions Fatal Influence (Fallon Henley and Lainey Reid), accompanied by their leader and WWE Women's United States Champion Jacy Jayne, versus Las Tóxicas (Flammer and AAA World Mixed Tag Team Champion La Hiedra), accompanied by Maravilla. Fatal Influence, along with Jayne, attacked Hiedra in the corner until Hiedra tagged in Flammer. After Flammer dove to the outside onto Fatal Influence, Maravilla and Jayne began to brawl on the outside. Flammer later kicked Reid's jaw, but she was unable to attempt a pinfall because the referee told her that she was not the legal competitor, which confused Flammer. Reid then took advantage of Hiedra's confusion by pinning Hiedra to win the match.

The next match was a 4-Way, 4-Brand Cruiserweight Contenders match to determine the number one contender for the AAA World Cruiserweight Championship, which featured SmackDown's Axiom, NXT's EK Prosper, Raw's Je'Von Evans, and AAA's Mini Vikingo, who later attempted a dive onto Axiom, but Evans interfered by executing a stunner on Vikingo, grabbing Vikingo's head before falling backwards to drive his head down into the mat. Prosper then followed with a moonsault on Evans, in which Prosper performed a backflip off the top rope backwards onto a supine Evans. Vikingo neutralized Prosper by performing a shooting star press on Prosper, jumping off the top rope by performing a backflip onto a supine Prosper. Vikingo then executed a corkscrew 630° splash onto Axiom, in which Vikingo rotated horizontally while performing a double front somersault off the top rope onto a supine Axiom. Vikingo then pinned Axiom to win the match and become the number one contender.

Then, AAA's La Catalina defended the AAA Reina de Reinas Championship against Raw's Roxanne Perez. Early into the match, Perez faked a knee injury to catch Catalina off guard with an attack before revealing her trickery. Perez later illegally put her feet on the ropes for leverage as she attempted a pinfall but the referee caught her. As Perez set Catalina up for an attack, Catalina countered with a backslide pin, in which Catalina hooked Perez's arms after standing back-to-back before kneeling forward to slide Perez backwards onto her shoulders. Catalina then flipped over Perez for leverage to win the match and retain her title.

In the penultimate match, The Lucha Brothers (Raw's Penta and SmackDown and AAA's AAA World Cruiserweight Champion Rey Fénix) faced two-thirds of the AAA World Trios Champions Los Perros del Mal (Daga and Berto), accompanied by AAA World Trios Champion Angel and Karmen Petrovic. As the match progressed, Petrovic interfered by tripping Fénix, allowing Perros del Mal to attack him. Fénix later executed a stunner on Daga, followed by a Mexican Destroyer from Penta on Berto, in which Penta flipped over Berto to force Berto to flip backwards and land his head onto the mat. Daga then attacked Fénix's groin, forcing the referee to end the match and give The Lucha Brothers a win via disqualification. Following the match, Garza entered the ring as Perros del Mal attacked The Lucha Brothers.

=== Main event ===
The main event featured teams consisting of Raw and AAA wrestlers as CM Punk, AAA General Manager Rey Mysterio, and AAA Mega Champion El Grande Americano fought Dominik Mysterio, Omos, and JD McDonagh, accompanied by Dorian Roldán. Rey and Americano executed a clothesline on Omos, in which Rey and Americano used their arms to attack Omos' chest, to send Omos to the outside. Rey then attacked Omos with the "619", in which Rey swung between the ropes to kick Omos' head as Omos rested on the ropes. Punk followed with a dive onto Omos on the outside. Dominik tried to attack Rey with the "619", but Punk blocked him. Punk then executed the "GTS" on McDonagh to win the match via pinfall.

Following the match, Dominik, Omos, and McDonagh attacked Punk, Rey, and Americano. Oba Femi then appeared and went face-to-face with Omos. Femi and Omos began to brawl, which ended when Femi sent Omos to the outside. A furious Omos tried to get back in the ring, but Dominik and McDonagh restrained him and convinced him to retreat.

== Reception ==
WrestleTix reported that WWE and AAA distributed an estimated 13,979 tickets for Worlds Collide.

=== Critical reception ===
Professional ratings
Publication	Matches							Overall	Ref.
Publication	1	2	3	4	5	6	7	Overall	Ref.
411Mania	B–	B	C+	B	B–	B	B–	8.0/10	
Bleacher Report	C+	A	B	A	B+	B+	A	A	
Súper Luchas	5.3/10	7.1/10	5.6/10	7.8/10	5.8/10	7.1/10	6.0/10	—N/a	
Wrestling Observer Newsletter	4.0/5	4.25/5	3.25/5	4.5/5	3.25/5	3.5/5	3.25/5	—N/a	
Match order: 1. La Parka, Mr. Iguana, Adelicious, and Mascarita Sagrada vs. The Vanity Project (Brad Baylor, Ricky Smokes, and Myka Lockwood) and Mini Abismo Negro; 2. Dragon Lee vs. Jack Cartwheel; 3. Fatal Influence (Fallon Henley and Lainey Reid) vs. Las Tóxicas (Flammer and La Hiedra); 4. Axiom vs. EK Prosper vs. Je'Von Evans vs. Mini Vikingo in a 4-Way, 4-Brand Cruiserweight Contenders match to determine the number one contender for the AAA World Cruiserweight Championship; 5. La Catalina (c) vs, Roxanne Perez for the AAA Reina de Reinas Championship; 6. The Lucha Brothers (Penta and Rey Fénix) vs. Los Perros del Mal (Daga and Berto); 7. CM Punk, Rey Mysterio, and El Grande Americano vs. Omos, Dominik Mysterio, and JD McDonagh

== Results ==
No.	Results	Stipulations	Times
1	La Parka, Mr. Iguana, Adelicious, and Mascarita Sagrada defeated The Vanity Project (Brad Baylor, Ricky Smokes, and Myka Lockwood) and Mini Abismo Negro (with Jackson Drake) by pinfall	Relevos Atómicos de Locura	12:08
2	Dragon Lee defeated Jack Cartwheel by pinfall	Singles match	8:57
3	Fatal Influence (Fallon Henley and Lainey Reid) (with Jacy Jayne) defeated Las Tóxicas (Flammer and La Hiedra) (with Maravilla) by pinfall	Tag team match	10:12
4	Mini Vikingo defeated Axiom, EK Prosper, and Je'Von Evans by pinfall	4-Way, 4-Brand Cruiserweight Contenders match to determine the number one contender for the AAA World Cruiserweight Championship	12:36
5	La Catalina (c) defeated Roxanne Perez by pinfall	Singles match for the AAA Reina de Reinas Championship	12:39
6	The Lucha Brothers (Penta and Rey Fénix) defeated Los Perros del Mal (Daga and Berto) (with Angel and Karmen Petrovic) by disqualification	Tag team match	15:14
7	CM Punk, Rey Mysterio, and El Grande Americano defeated Omos, Dominik Mysterio, and JD McDonagh (with Dorian Roldán) by pinfall	Trios match	20:03
(c) / – the champion(s) heading into the match
