= Worlds Collide (2019) =

WWE Network event

- Promotional poster featuring various WWE wrestlers
- Promotion: WWE
- Brand(s): 205 Live; NXT; NXT UK
- Date: January 26 and 27, 2019 (aired February 2, 2019)
- City: Phoenix, Arizona
- Venue: Phoenix Convention Center

WWE event chronology
| ← Previous; Royal Rumble | Next → Halftime Heat |

Worlds Collide chronology
| ← Previous; First | Next → 2020 |

The 2019 Worlds Collide was a professional wrestling streaming event produced by WWE, held for wrestlers from the promotion's NXT, NXT UK, and 205 Live brand divisions. It was the inaugural Worlds Collide and took place on January 26 and 27, 2019, at the Phoenix Convention Center in Phoenix, Arizona as part of that year's Royal Rumble weekend. The event aired on tape delay as one single event on February 2, 2019, on the WWE Network. The event was based around direct competition between wrestlers from the three brands.

The event featured the 15-man Worlds Collide tournament, with the wrestlers being equally divided among the NXT, NXT UK, and 205 Live rosters. The prize was a championship match of the winner's choice from the three brands. The tournament was won by NXT's Velveteen Dream, who chose to challenge Johnny Gargano for the NXT North American Championship.

== Production ==
=== Background ===
In early January 2019, the professional wrestling promotion WWE announced that it would be hosting an interbrand tournament to take place during the weekend of that year's Royal Rumble pay-per-view and livestreaming event. The tournament was a two-day event, held on January 26 and 27 at the Phoenix Convention Center in Phoenix, Arizona, and aired on tape delay as one single event on February 2 on the WWE Network.

The event hosted a 15-man single-elimination tournament, called the Worlds Collide Tournament, which was evenly divided between wrestlers from the NXT, NXT UK, and 205 Live brands. The winner of the tournament received a future match for a championship of their choice, with the choices being the NXT Championship, the NXT North American Championship, NXT UK's WWE United Kingdom Championship, and 205 Live's WWE Cruiserweight Championship—the latter only being an option if the winner was within the 205 lb. weight limit.

=== Storylines ===
Other on-screen personnel
| Role | Name |
|---|---|
| Commentators | Tom Phillips |
| Commentators | Vic Joseph |
| Commentators | Byron Saxton |
| Commentators | Nigel McGuinness |
| Ring announcers | Greg Hamilton |
| Ring announcers | Mike Rome |
| Ring announcers | Sarah Schreiber |
| WWE Global Headquarters host | Charly Caruso |
| Referees | Tom Castor |
| Referees | D.A. Brewer |
| Referees | Drake Wuertz |
| Referees | Chris Sharpe |

The card included matches that resulted from scripted storylines. Results were predetermined by WWE's writers on the NXT, NXT UK, and 205 Live brands, with storylines produced on WWE's weekly television shows, NXT, NXT UK, and the cruiserweight-exclusive 205 Live.

On January 10, a 15-man battle royal was announced for the event. The order of elimination in the battle royal determined the first-round matches for the Worlds Collide tournament. The winner of the battle royal would receive a bye to the second-round.

== Participants ==
– NXT
– NXT UK
– 205 Live

| Wrestler | Date |
|---|---|
| Adam Cole | January 10, 2019 |
| Velveteen Dream | January 10, 2019 |
| Dominik Dijakovic | January 10, 2019 |
| Keith Lee | January 10, 2019 |
| Shane Thorne | January 22, 2019 |
| Mark Andrews | January 10, 2019 |
| Tyler Bate | January 10, 2019 |
| Travis Banks | January 10, 2019 |
| Jordan Devlin | January 10, 2019 |
| Zack Gibson | January 10, 2019 |
| Cedric Alexander | January 10, 2019 |
| Tony Nese | January 10, 2019 |
| Drew Gulak | January 10, 2019 |
| TJP | January 10, 2019 |
| Humberto Carrillo | January 15, 2019 |

== Tournament bracket ==
1st Round; Royal Rumble Axxess; January 26, 2019 (Aired: February 2)
205 Live | Drew Gulak | Pinfall
NXT UK | Mark Andrews | 8:29
205 Live | Humberto Carrillo | Pinfall
NXT UK | Zack Gibson | 6:18
NXT | Velveteen Dream | Pinfall
205 Live | Tony Nese | 9:06
NXT | Adam Cole | Pinfall
NXT | Shane Thorne | 11:10
NXT UK | Travis Banks | 4:49
NXT | Keith Lee | Pinfall
205 Live | TJP | 8:59
NXT | Dominik Dijakovic | Pinfall
NXT UK | Tyler Bate | Pinfall
205 Live | Cedric Alexander | 10:37

Quarterfinals; Royal Rumble Axxess; January 26, 2019 (Aired: February 2)
NXT UK | Jordan Devlin | Pinfall
205 Live | Drew Gulak | 11:43
205 Live | Humberto Carrillo | 11:23
NXT | Velveteen Dream | Pinfall
NXT | Adam Cole | Pinfall
NXT | Keith Lee | 10:24
NXT | Dominik Dijakovic | 9:23
NXT UK | Tyler Bate | Pinfall

Semifinals; Royal Rumble Axxess; January 27, 2019 (Aired: February 2)
NXT UK | Jordan Devlin | 12:23
NXT | Velveteen Dream | Pinfall
NXT | Adam Cole | 10:30
NXT UK | Tyler Bate | Pinfall

Final; Royal Rumble Axxess; January 27, 2019 (Aired: February 2)
NXT | Velveteen Dream | Pinfall
NXT UK | Tyler Bate | 16:09

== Aftermath ==
The "Worlds Collide" name was subsequently adopted for a WWE Network series that aired in April 2019. During the Royal Rumble 2020 weekend announcements, WWE revealed that a second Worlds Collide event would air live on the WWE Network on January 25, 2020, and held at the Toyota Center in Houston, Texas, though unlike the 2019 event, it would only feature the NXT and NXT UK brands and not also 205 Live (which was later dissolved in February 2022). Also unlike the 2019 event, there was not a Worlds Collide Tournament with a future championship opportunity at stake. Instead, the card's matches were interbrand matches pitting wrestlers from NXT against those from NXT UK.

== Results ==
=== January 26 ===
| No. | Results | Stipulations | Times |
|---|---|---|---|
| 1^{D} | Flash Morgan Webster defeated James Drake | Singles match | — |
| 2 | Jordan Devlin defeated Adam Cole, Cedric Alexander, Dominik Dijakovic, Drew Gulak, Humberto Carrillo, Keith Lee, Mark Andrews, Shane Thorne, TJP, Tony Nese, Travis Banks, Tyler Bate, Velveteen Dream, and Zack Gibson | 15-man Battle Royal to determine the first-round matches for the Worlds Collide tournament Since Devlin won, he received a bye to the second round | 19:29 |
| 3 | Drew Gulak defeated Mark Andrews | Worlds Collide tournament first round match | 8:57 |
| 4 | Dominik Dijakovic defeated TJP | Worlds Collide tournament first round match | 11:00 |
| 5 | Keith Lee defeated Travis Banks | Worlds Collide tournament first round match | 5:06 |
| 6 | Humberto Carrillo defeated Zack Gibson | Worlds Collide tournament first round match | 6:18 |
| 7 | Velveteen Dream defeated Tony Nese | Worlds Collide tournament first round match | 9:05 |
| 8 | Adam Cole defeated Shane Thorne | Worlds Collide tournament first round match | 11:10 |
| 9 | Tyler Bate defeated Cedric Alexander | Worlds Collide tournament first round match | 10:37 |
| 10^{D} | Walter defeated Danny Burch | Singles match | — |
| 11 | Jordan Devlin defeated Drew Gulak | Worlds Collide tournament quarterfinal match | 11:43 |
| 12 | Velveteen Dream defeated Humberto Carrillo | Worlds Collide tournament quarterfinal match | 11:23 |
| 13 | Adam Cole defeated Keith Lee | Worlds Collide tournament quarterfinal match | 10:24 |
| 14 | Tyler Bate defeated Dominik Dijakovic | Worlds Collide tournament quarterfinal match | 9:23 |
D / – this was a dark match

=== January 27 ===
| No. | Results | Stipulations | Times |
|---|---|---|---|
| 1^{D} | Candice LeRae defeated Xia Li | Singles match | — |
| 2^{D} | Fabian Aichner defeated Ligero | Singles match | — |
| 3 | Tyler Bate defeated Adam Cole | Worlds Collide tournament semifinal match | 10:30 |
| 4 | Velveteen Dream defeated Jordan Devlin | Worlds Collide tournament semifinal match | 12:23 |
| 5^{D} | Mia Yim and Taynara Conti defeated Chelsea Green and Vanessa Borne | Tag team match | — |
| 6^{D} | Trent Seven defeated Gentleman Jack Gallagher | Singles match | 10:00 |
| 7^{D} | The Coffey Brothers (Joe Coffey and Mark Coffey) defeated Mark Andrews and Flash Morgan Webster | Tag team match | — |
| 8^{D} | Walter defeated Kassius Ohno | Singles match | — |
| 9^{D} | James Drake and Zack Gibson defeated Danny Burch and Oney Lorcan | Tag team match | — |
| 10 | Velveteen Dream defeated Tyler Bate | Worlds Collide tournament final match | 16:09 |
D / – this was a dark match
