= Worlds Collide (September 2025) =

WWE and AAA premium live event

Worlds Collide: Las Vegas
- Promotional poster featuring various AAA and WWE wrestlers
- Promotion(s): WWE; Lucha Libre AAA Worldwide
- Brand(s): Raw; SmackDown; NXT
- Date: September 12, 2025
- City: Paradise, Nevada
- Venue: Cox Pavilion at the Thomas & Mack Center

Pay-per-view chronology
← Previous; WWE: Clash in Paris; AAA: Triplemanía XXXIII	Next → WWE: Wrestlepalooza; AAA: Héroes Inmortales

Worlds Collide chronology
← Previous; June 2025	Next → September 2026

The September 2025 Worlds Collide, also known as Worlds Collide: Las Vegas, Worlds Collide II, and Worlds Collide Dos, was a professional wrestling livestreaming event and supercard co-produced by the American promotion WWE and its Mexican sister promotion Lucha Libre AAA Worldwide (AAA). It was the fifth Worlds Collide, and the second with AAA, and was held for wrestlers from WWE's Raw, SmackDown, and NXT brand divisions, and those from AAA. It took place on Friday, September 12, 2025, at the Cox Pavilion at the Thomas & Mack Center in the Las Vegas suburb of Paradise, Nevada and was based around direct competition between wrestlers from the two promotions.

This marked the first time WWE held two Worlds Collide events in the same year, following the June 2025 event in Inglewood, California. It aired for free via WWE's YouTube channel with both English and Spanish language commentary at 7:00 p.m. Pacific Time (10:00 p.m. Eastern Time) immediately after WWE's Friday Night SmackDown.

Six matches were contested at the event. In the main event, Raw's Dominik Mysterio defeated AAA's El Hijo del Vikingo to win the AAA Mega Championship, becoming the first wrestler to hold championships in WWE and AAA simultaneously as Mysterio was also the reigning WWE Intercontinental Champion. In other prominent matches, AAA's El Hijo de Dr. Wagner Jr. defeated Raw's Dragon Lee, NXT's Ethan Page, and Raw's JD McDonagh in a fatal four-way match to retain the AAA Latin American Championship, and the team of Pagano and Psycho Clown from AAA defeated the team of Grayson Waller and Kofi Kingston from Raw to retain the AAA World Tag Team Championship.

== Production ==
=== Background ===
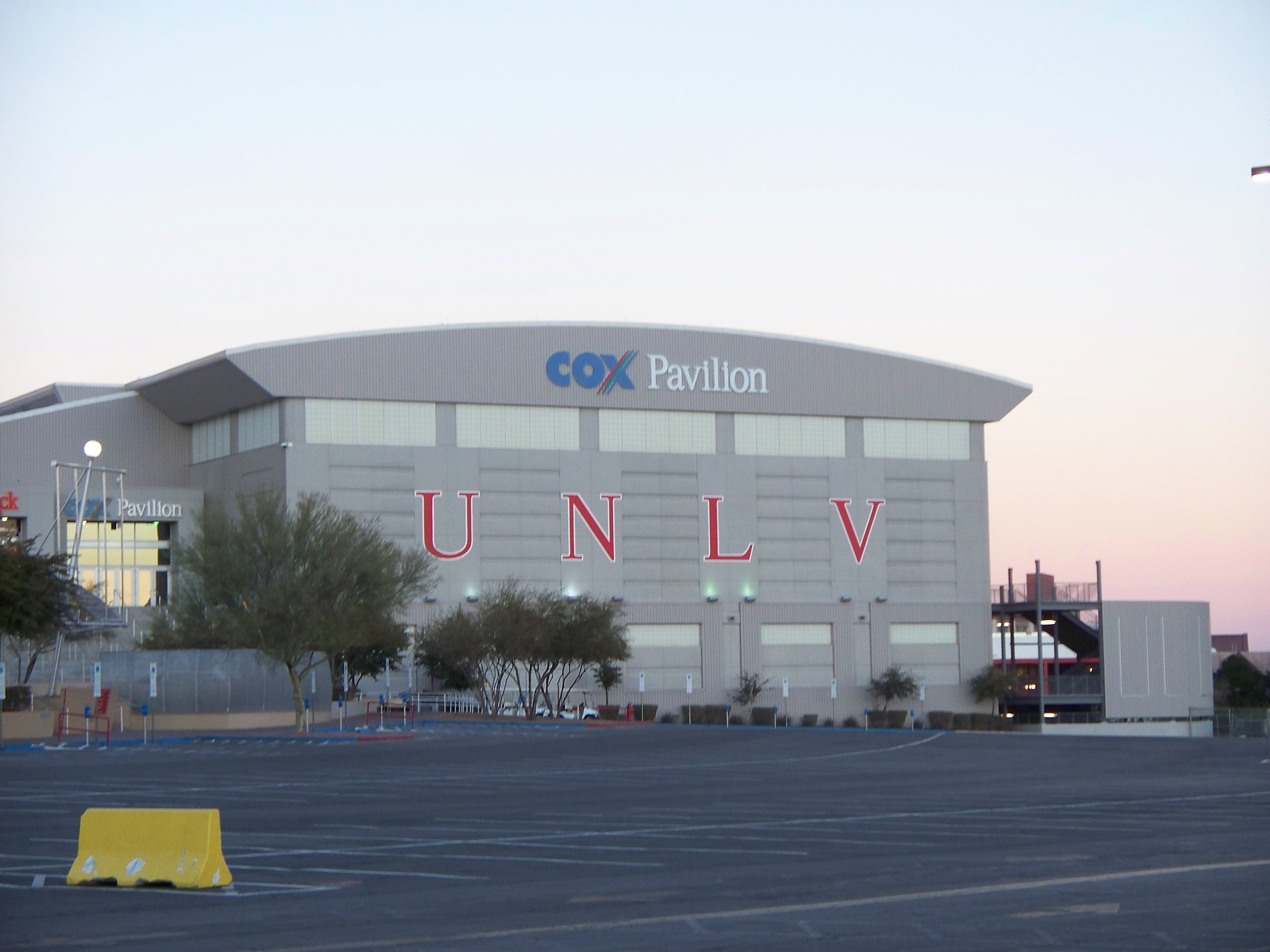
The fifth Worlds Collide was held at the Cox Pavilion at the Thomas & Mack Center in the Las Vegas suburb of Paradise, Nevada.

Worlds Collide is a series of professional wrestling premium live events (PLE) produced by the American promotion WWE since 2019 and feature direct competition between wrestlers from the promotion's various brands. On June 7, 2025, WWE held its fourth Worlds Collide event in Inglewood, California, which was in collaboration with the Mexican promotion Lucha Libre AAA Worldwide (AAA). Three months before that in April, WWE had announced its intention to acquire AAA, which was finalized on August 1, 2025.

On August 16, 2025, during AAA's Triplemanía XXXIII, it was announced that WWE and AAA would copromote a second Worlds Collide event, and a second one for the year and the fifth Worlds Collide overall, on Friday, September 12, 2025, at the Cox Pavilion at the Thomas & Mack Center in the Las Vegas suburb of Paradise, Nevada. The event was in turn promoted as Worlds Collide: Las Vegas, as well as Worlds Collide II and Worlds Collide Dos for AAA. The event was livestreamed for free on WWE's YouTube channel with both English and Spanish commentary at 7:00 p.m. Pacific Time (10:00 p.m. Eastern Time) immediately after WWE's Friday Night SmackDown program. In addition to AAA, it featured wrestlers from WWE's Raw, SmackDown, and NXT brands.

The event was held as part of Mexican independence day weekend, a major weekend for Mexican combat sports. During the weekend, WWE's parent company TKO Group Holdings promoted a fight between Mexican boxer Canelo Álvarez and American boxer Terence Crawford on September 13 at the Allegiant Stadium in Las Vegas under the Zuffa Boxing banner, while sister company Ultimate Fighting Championship (UFC) also held UFC Fight Night: Lopes vs. Silva, the third edition of the annual "Noche UFC" mixed martial arts (MMA) event celebrating Mexican culture, that same day in San Antonio, Texas.

=== Storylines ===
The event included professional wrestling matches that resulted from scripted storylines. Results were predetermined by writers of the participating promotions, while storylines were produced on WWE's weekly television programs, Monday Night Raw, Friday Night SmackDown, and Tuesday night's NXT, as well as at other WWE and AAA events.

After retaining the AAA Mega Championship at Triplemanía Regia III, El Hijo del Vikingo appeared at the AAA Alianzas event on July 25, addressing the crowd before being interrupted by Dragon Lee and El Grande Americano from WWE's Raw brand. Later, a masked figure attacked all three men before revealing himself as Raw's Dominik Mysterio, who announced his intentions of challenging for the title. This led to a four-way match at Triplemanía XXXIII on August 16, where Vikingo pinned Mysterio to retain the title after interference from Mysterio's rival AJ Styles. A day later, Mysterio stated that he would see Vikingo at Worlds Collide, and a match between both men for the title was subsequently made official.

== Results ==
No.	Results	Stipulations	Times
1	La Parka, Mascarita Sagrada, and Aztec Warriors (Laredo Kid and Octagón Jr.) defeated Latino World Order (Cruz Del Toro and Joaquin Wilde), Lince Dorado, and Mini Abismo Negro by pinfall	Lucha Showcase eight-man tag team match	18:04
2	Natalya defeated Faby Apache by pinfall	Singles match to determine the #1 contender for the AAA Reina de Reinas Championship	9:12
3	Pagano and Psycho Clown (c) defeated Grayson Waller and Kofi Kingston (with Xavier Woods) by pinfall	Tag team match for the AAA World Tag Team Championship	16:54
4	Lola Vice and Mr. Iguana defeated The Judgment Day (Finn Bálor and Roxanne Perez) (with Raquel Rodriguez) by pinfall	Mixed tag team match	12:00
5	El Hijo de Dr. Wagner Jr. (c) defeated Dragon Lee, Ethan Page, and JD McDonagh by pinfall	Fatal four-way match for the AAA Latin American Championship	9:56
6	Dominik Mysterio defeated El Hijo del Vikingo (c) by pinfall	Singles match for the AAA Mega Championship	18:22
(c) / – the champion(s) heading into the match
