= Guerra de Titanes (2026) =

AAA professional wrestling event

- Promotion(s): Lucha Libre AAA Worldwide; WWE (Note: WWE will handle the production of this event.)
- Date: December 19, 2026
- City: Guadalajara, Jalisco, Mexico
- Venue: Arena Guadalajara

Event chronology
← Previous; Worlds Collide: Doomsday	Next → Eternal Glory

Guerra de Titanes chronology
← Previous; 2025	Next → —

The 2026 Guerra de Titanes (Spanish for "War of the Titans") is an upcoming professional wrestling livestreaming event produced by the Mexican professional wrestling promotion Lucha Libre AAA Worldwide (AAA), in partnership with its parent company WWE. The event will take place on Saturday, December 19, 2026, at Arena Guadalajara in Guadalajara, Jalisco, Mexico. It will be the 27th Guerra de Titanes show promoted by AAA since 1997, and will be the second Guerra de Titanes to be held under WWE's ownership of AAA. It will air as a special episode of Lucha Libre AAA.

== Production ==
=== Background ===
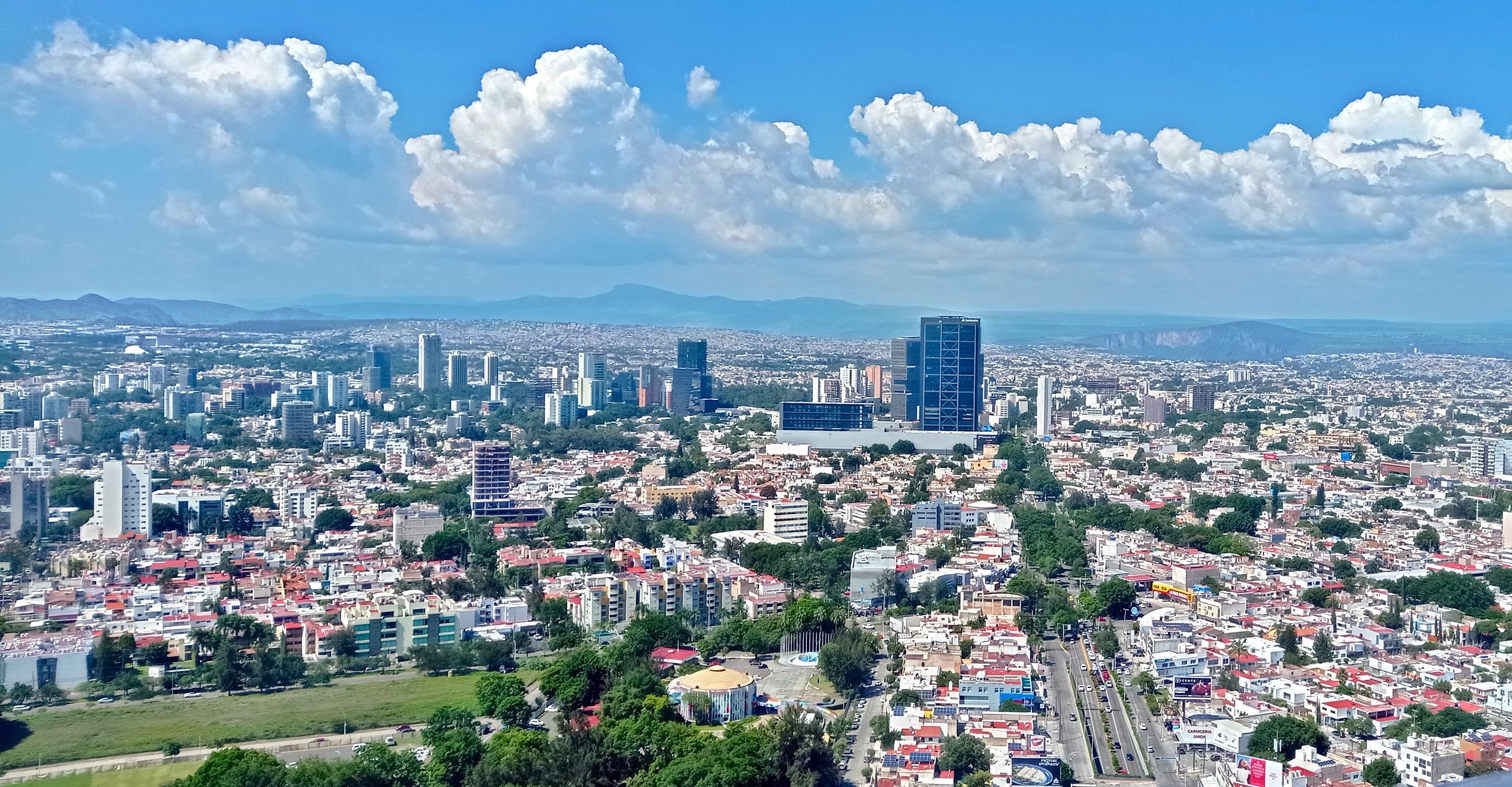
Guerra de Titanes will take place at Arena Guadalajara in Guadalajara, Jalisco, Mexico.

Since 1997, the Mexican professional wrestling promotion Lucha Libre AAA Worldwide (AAA) has held a major event late in the year, either November or December, called Guerra de Titanes (Spanish for "War of the Titans"). The show often features championship matches and Luchas de Apuestas (Spanish for "bet matches"), where the competitors risk their wrestling mask or hair on the outcome of the match. In lucha libre, Luchas de Apuestas are considered more prestigious than a championship match, and many major events feature at least one of these matches. In 2016, AAA moved the event to January, but it was moved back to December in 2018.

On September 18, 2026, AAA announced that the 27th Guerra de Titanes event will take place on December 19 at Arena Guadalajara in Guadalajara, Jalisco, Mexico.

=== Broadcast outlets ===
As part of the media rights agreement with Fox in Latin America that was announced on November 25, 2025, Guerra de Titanes will air live across Fox platforms in Latin America. The event will be livestreamed on WWE and AAA's YouTube channels and Facebook pages outside of Latin America.

=== Storylines ===
Guerra de Titanes will feature professional wrestling matches, with different wrestlers involved in pre-existing scripted feuds, plots and storylines. Wrestlers will portray either heels (referred to as rudos in Mexico, those that portray the "bad guys") or faces (técnicos in Mexico, the "good guy" characters) as they follow a series of tension-building events, which will culminate in wrestling matches.

On November 10, 2026, AAA World Cruiserweight Champion Rey Fénix announced the Rey Fénix World Cruiserweight Tournament, which will determine his challenger in his title defense on the January 2, 2027, episode of Lucha Libre AAA. The tournament consists of four triple threat matches in the first round and a fatal four-way match in the tournament final at Guerra de Titanes. The tournament features wrestlers from AAA and WWE's brands, Raw, SmackDown, and NXT. The tournament began on the November 14, 2026, episode of Lucha Libre AAA, where Jack Cartwheel defeated Kento and Lince Dorado to advance to the tournament final.

== Matches ==
No.	Matches*	Stipulations
1	Jack Cartwheel vs. Takuma vs. two TBD	Fatal four-way Rey Fénix World Cruiserweight Tournament final The winner will challenge Rey Fénix for the AAA World Cruiserweight Championship on the January 2, 2027, episode of Lucha Libre AAA.
*Card subject to change

=== Rey Fénix World Cruiserweight Tournament ===
First round Lucha Libre AAA; November 14–28, 2026
Kento	—
Lince Dorado	9:59
Jack Cartwheel	Pinfall
Colmillo de Plata	—
Drago	—
Takuma	Win

Final; Guerra de Titanes; December 19, 2026
Jack Cartwheel
Takuma
