= Worlds Collide (2022) =

WWE premium live event

- Promotional poster featuring Bron Breakker and Tyler Bate
- Promotion: WWE
- Brand(s): NXT 2.0; NXT UK
- Date: September 4, 2022
- City: Orlando, Florida
- Venue: WWE Performance Center

WWE event chronology
← Previous; Clash at the Castle	Next → Extreme Rules

Worlds Collide chronology
← Previous; 2020	Next → 2025

NXT major events chronology
← Previous; In Your House	Next → Halloween Havoc

The 2022 Worlds Collide was a professional wrestling premium live event (PLE) produced by WWE, held primarily for wrestlers from the promotion's developmental brands, NXT 2.0 and NXT UK. It was the third Worlds Collide and took place on Sunday, September 4, 2022, at NXT's home venue, the WWE Performance Center in Orlando, Florida. While the event was primarily held for the promotion's developmental brands, some wrestlers from WWE's main roster brands, Raw and SmackDown, also appeared. The concept of the event was based around direct competition between wrestlers from the four brands.

This was the first Worlds Collide event held since 2020. This was also the final event for NXT UK, which went on hiatus afterwards for a planned relaunch as NXT Europe, and it was NXT's last major event in which the brand was referred to as "NXT 2.0", as nine days later, the "2.0" moniker was dropped. It would also be the first Worlds Collide to livestream on Peacock in the United States, SonyLIV in India, and Disney+ Hotstar in Indonesia, and it was the first Worlds Collide to be branded as a "premium live event", a term the company introduced at the start of the year to refer to its events airing on traditional pay-per-view and via WWE's livestreaming platforms.

Seven matches were contested at the event, including two dark matches that were later streamed on Level Up. All five matches that took place at the actual event were interbrand championship matches and saw all but one of NXT UK's championships unified into their respective NXT championship counterparts. In the main event, NXT Champion Bron Breakker defeated NXT United Kingdom Champion Tyler Bate to unify both championships. In other prominent matches, NXT Women's Champion Mandy Rose defeated NXT UK Women's Champion Meiko Satomura and Blair Davenport in a triple threat match to unify both women's championships, and Pretty Deadly (Elton Prince and Kit Wilson) defeated NXT Tag Team Champions The Creed Brothers (Brutus Creed and Julius Creed), NXT UK Tag Team Champions Brooks Jensen and Josh Briggs, and Gallus (Mark Coffey and Wolfgang) in a fatal four-way tag team elimination match to unify both tag team championships. The NXT UK Heritage Cup was the only championship between the two brands that was not defended at the event and it was later transferred to NXT in April 2023.

== Production ==
=== Background ===
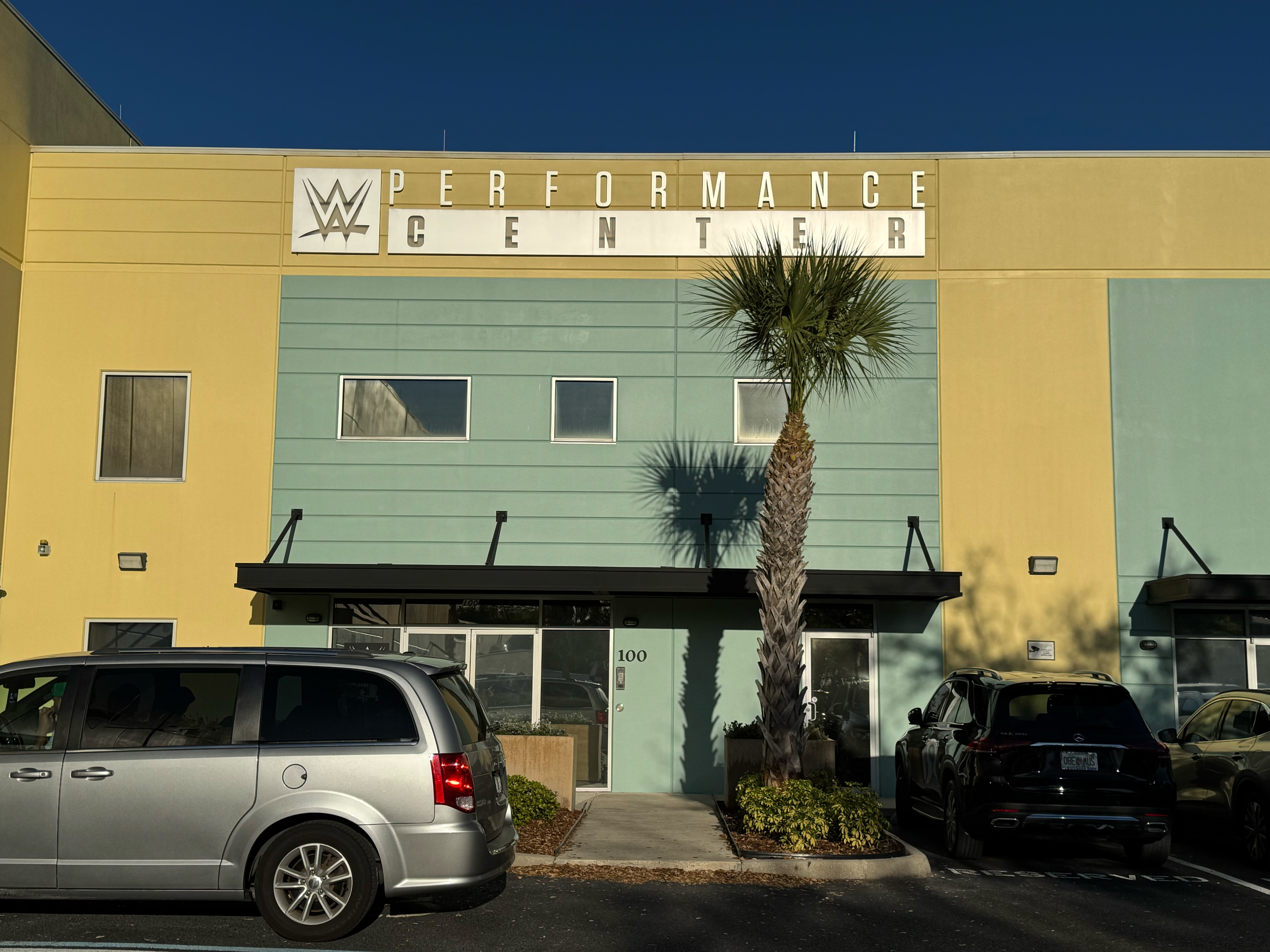
The third Worlds Collide was held at NXT's home venue, the WWE Performance Center in Orlando, Florida.

Worlds Collide is a series of professional wrestling premium live events (PLE) produced by WWE since 2019 and feature direct competition between wrestlers from the promotion's various brands. After not being held in 2021 due to the COVID-19 pandemic and after NXT was rebranded as NXT 2.0 in September 2021, reverting it to a developmental brand, WWE announced on August 18, 2022, that Worlds Collide would return on Sunday, September 4, 2022, and be held at NXT's home venue, the WWE Performance Center in Orlando, Florida. It was the third Worlds Collide and primarily featured wrestlers from the NXT and NXT UK developmental brands. The announcement also confirmed that this would be the final event for NXT UK, as following the event, the brand went on hiatus for a future relaunch as NXT Europe. This would also be the first Worlds Collide to be branded as a "premium live event", a term the company introduced on January 1 to refer to its events that are available on pay-per-view and via livestreaming.

=== Broadcast outlets ===
The PLE was broadcast on WWE's livestreaming platforms. These included Peacock in the United States, SonyLIV in India, Disney+ Hotstar in Indonesia, and the WWE Network everywhere else. It was the first Worlds Collide to livestream on SonyLIV, Peacock, and Disney+ Hotstar after those countries' respective versions of the WWE Network merged under those services in February 2021, April 2021, and January 2022, respectively.

=== Storylines ===
Other on-screen personnel
Role:	Name:
Commentators	Vic Joseph
Commentators	Wade Barrett
Spanish commentators	Marcelo Rodríguez
Spanish commentators	Jerry Soto
Ring announcer	Alicia Taylor
Referees	Adrian Butler
Referees	Chip Danning
Referees	Joey Gonzalez
Referees	Dallas Irvin
Referees	Derek Sanders
Pre-show panel	Sam Roberts
Pre-show panel	McKenzie Mitchell

The card included five matches, as well as two dark matches before the live broadcast, that resulted from scripted storylines. Results were predetermined by WWE's writers on the NXT and NXT UK brands, while storylines were produced on WWE's weekly television programs, NXT 2.0 and NXT UK, and the supplementary online streaming show, Level Up.

After Bron Breakker successfully retained the NXT Championship at Heatwave, NXT United Kingdom Champion Tyler Bate appeared to confront Breakker. On the August 23 episode of NXT, both Bate and Breakker signed a contract for a championship unification match to take place at Worlds Collide.

On the August 23 episode of NXT, NXT Women's Champion Mandy Rose confronted Blair Davenport and demanded respect from her. NXT UK Women's Champion Meiko Satomura joined the confrontation, and the two champions argued who was better. The champions then agreed to a title unification match at Worlds Collide, with Davenport also being added to the match due to being the number one contender for the NXT UK Women's Championship, thus making it a triple threat title unification match.

On the August 30 episode of NXT, NXT Women's Tag Team Champions Katana Chance and Kayden Carter were confronted by Doudrop and Nikki A.S.H. from Raw, who challenged the champions for the title at Worlds Collide, which was made official.

At Heatwave, while Diamond Mine (Roderick Strong, Damon Kemp, and NXT Tag Team Champions Brutus Creed and Julius Creed) were talking about The Creed Brothers's success, they were interrupted by Gallus (Joe Coffey, Mark Coffey, and Wolfgang), who laid them out. Later that night, Gallus interrupted NXT UK Tag Team Champions Josh Briggs and Brooks Jensen, and a brawl broke out, leading to a title match the following week, where Gallus won via countout after Lash Legend attacked Fallon Henley, leading to Pretty Deadly (Kit Wilson and Elton Prince) brawling with Briggs and Jensen outside the ring, but Briggs and Jensen retained. On the August 30 episode, during a six-person mixed tag team match pitting Henley, Jensen, and Briggs against Pretty Deadly and Legend, Gallus interfered in favor of Legend and Pretty Deadly and helped them to win. On the same episode, after Joe, Mark, and Wolfgang defeated Damon Kemp and The Creed Brothers, a brawl started between both teams, and Pretty Deadly, Briggs, and Jensen joined the fight. This led to a fatal four-way tag team elimination match being scheduled between The Creed Brothers, Briggs and Jensen, Gallus, and Pretty Deadly at Worlds Collide, which would also be a title unification match.

On the August 30 episode of NXT, NXT North American Champion Carmelo Hayes, alongside Trick Williams, discussed how no one could match Hayes's level. Ricochet from SmackDown then appeared to challenge Hayes for the title at World Collide, which was made official.

== Aftermath ==
Tyler Bate opened the following episode of NXT to talk about his loss to Bron Breakker, only to be interrupted by Gallus (Joe Coffey, Mark Coffey, and Wolfgang). They attacked Bate and also took out security guards. Breakker made the save, and a tag team match pitting Breakker and Bate against Joe and Mark was scheduled for that episode's main event, where Breakker and Bate won. Afterwards, they were attacked by JD McDonagh, who wanted another shot at the NXT Championship after losing to Breakker at Heatwave. This set up a match between Bate and McDonagh to determine the number one contender for the title on the September 20 episode where McDonagh was victorious.

On the September 13 episode of NXT, The Creed Brothers (Brutus Creed and Julius Creed) took on Pretty Deadly (Kit Wilson and Elton Prince) in a Steel Cage match for the NXT Tag Team Championship. Pretty Deadly retained after Damon Kemp handcuffed Julius to the top of the cage, leaving Brutus to fight Pretty Deadly alone. The Creed Brothers would continue their feud with Kemp over the next few weeks and on the October 4 episode, an ambulance match between Julius and Kemp was scheduled for Halloween Havoc, with the added stipulation that Brutus must leave NXT should Julius lose.

For costing them the NXT Women's Tag Team Championship, Toxic Attraction (Gigi Dolin and Jacy Jayne) faced Doudrop and Nikki A.S.H. on the following episode of NXT in a losing effort.

For costing him the NXT North American Championship, Trick Williams took on Ricochet on the following episode of NXT in a losing effort.

On the September 20 episode of NXT, a Pub Rules match pitting Josh Briggs and Brooks Jensen against Gallus (Mark Coffey and Wolfgang) was scheduled for the following week, where Briggs and Jensen won. Following the match, Mark, Joe Coffey, and Wolfgang attacked security guards and a referee before they were arrested as NXT ended. Afterwards, it was announced that Gallus were suspended indefinitely. Gallus made their return at NXT: New Year's Evil on January 10, 2023, where they won a gauntlet match to become the number one contenders for the NXT Tag Team Championship. They replaced Gallus in the match, setting up another match between the two teams for the following week, where Gallus was victorious, ending the feud.

The 2022 Worlds Collide would be NXT's last major event in which the brand was referred to as "NXT 2.0". At the end of the September 13 episode of NXT, a video package aired that summarized the past year of NXT's "2.0 era" and was narrated by Shawn Michaels. He talked about the brand consistently evolving with a focus on the future. Afterwards, a new gold-and-white logo was introduced, with the "NXT" logo remaining unchanged but the "2.0" moniker dropped.

The NXT UK Heritage Cup was the only title between NXT and NXT UK that was not defended at the event. The title's status remained unknown until April 2023 when reigning champion Noam Dar appeared on the April 4, 2023, episode of NXT with the Heritage Cup. It was subsequently transferred to NXT and renamed to NXT Heritage Cup.

== Results ==
No.	Results	Stipulations	Times
1^{D}	Charlie Dempsey defeated Bodhi Hayward (with Andre Chase and Thea Hail)	Singles match	7:50
2^{D}	Channing "Stacks" Lorenzo (with Tony D'Angelo) defeated Ikemen Jiro	Singles match	5:15
3	Carmelo Hayes (c) (with Trick Williams) defeated Ricochet by pinfall	Singles match for the NXT North American Championship	15:57
4	Pretty Deadly (Elton Prince and Kit Wilson) (with Lash Legend) defeated The Creed Brothers (Brutus Creed and Julius Creed) (NXT) (with Damon Kemp), Brooks Jensen and Josh Briggs (NXT UK) (with Fallon Henley), and Gallus (Mark Coffey and Wolfgang) (with Joe Coffey) by pinfall	Fatal four-way tag team elimination match to unify the NXT Tag Team Championship and NXT UK Tag Team Championship (Note: The NXT UK Tag Team Championship was immediately retired with Brooks Jensen and Josh Briggs officially recognized as the final champions.)	15:34
5	Mandy Rose (NXT) defeated Meiko Satomura (NXT UK) and Blair Davenport by pinfall	Triple threat match to unify the NXT Women's Championship and NXT UK Women's Championship (Note: The NXT UK Women's Championship was immediately retired with Meiko Satomura officially recognized as the final champion.)	13:17
6	Katana Chance and Kayden Carter (c) defeated Doudrop and Nikki A.S.H. by pinfall	Tag team match for the NXT Women's Tag Team Championship	10:19
7	Bron Breakker (NXT) defeated Tyler Bate (NXT UK) by pinfall	Singles match to unify the NXT Championship and NXT United Kingdom Championship (Note: The NXT United Kingdom Championship was immediately retired with Tyler Bate officially recognized as the final champion.)	17:11
(c) / – the champion(s) heading into the match; D / – this was a dark match

=== Fatal four-way tag team elimination match ===
Eliminated	Wrestler	Team	Eliminated by	Method of elimination	Times
1	Brooks Jensen	Josh Briggs and Brooks Jensen (NXT UK)	Mark Coffey	Pinned after an enziguri/suplex combo	4:45
2	Wolfgang	Gallus	Julius Creed	Pinned after a Doomsday Cannonball Device	8:37
3	Julius Creed	The Creed Brothers (NXT)	Elton Prince	Pinned after a Backstabber from Damon Kemp	15:34
Winners:	Pretty Deadly		—N/a		15:34

== See also ==
- 2022 in professional wrestling
- List of WWE pay-per-view and livestreaming supercards
