= AAA Eternal Glory =

2027 professional wrestling event

Eternal Glory
- Promotion(s): Lucha Libre AAA Worldwide; WWE (Note: WWE handles the production of this event.)
- Date: April 2027
- City: New York City, New York, U.S.
- Venue: Infosys Theater at Madison Square Garden

Event chronology
← Previous; Guerra de Titanes	Next → —

Eternal Glory, also promoted as Eternal Glory: New York, is an upcoming professional wrestling livestreaming event produced by Lucha Libre AAA Worldwide (AAA), in partnership with its parent company WWE. The event will take place in April 2027 at Infosys Theater at Madison Square Garden in New York City, New York, United States. It will be part of WrestleMania 43 weekend.

== Production ==
=== Background ===
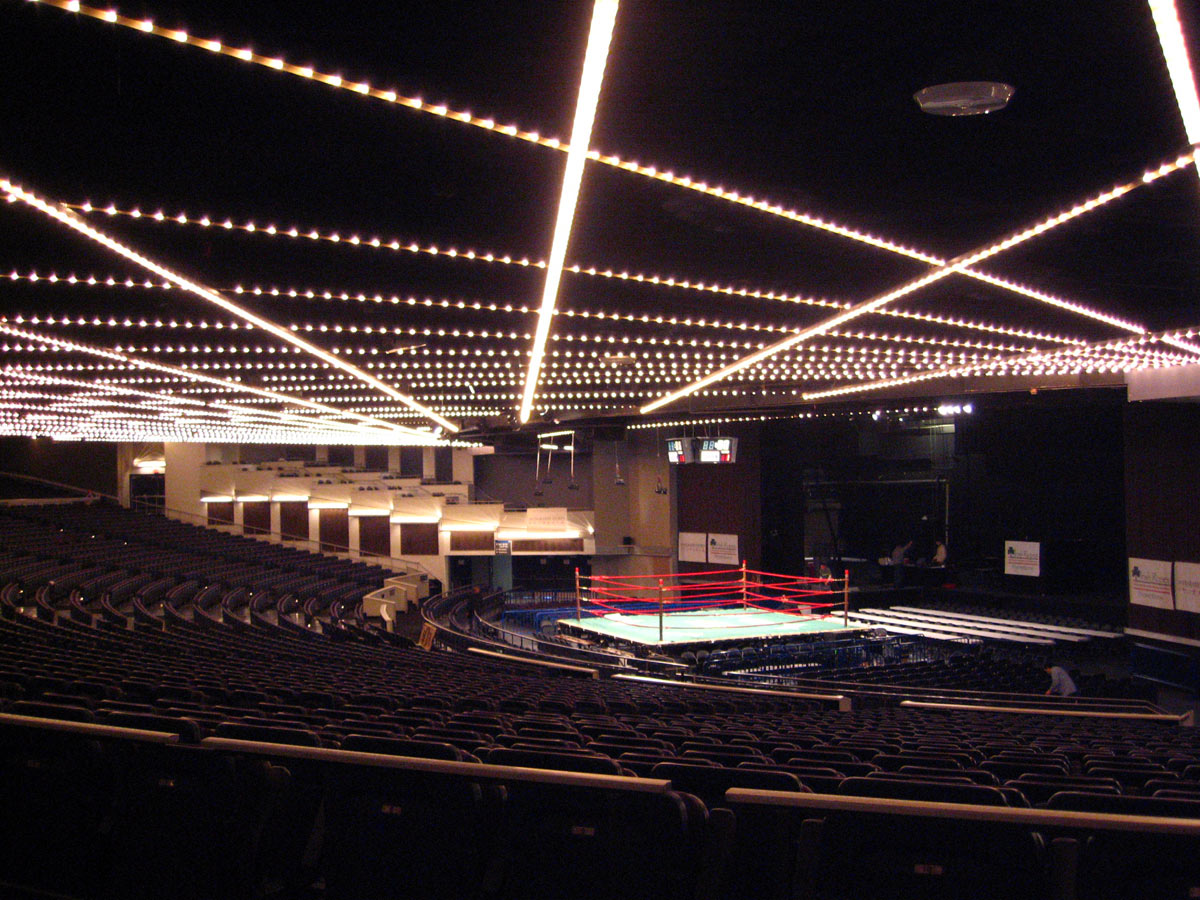
Eternal Glory will take place at the Infosys Theater at Madison Square Garden in New York City, New York, United States.

On July 20, 2026, WWE announced Eternal Glory at the Infosys Theater at Madison Square Garden in New York City, New York, United States. The event is scheduled to take place in April 2027 during WrestleMania 43 weekend.

=== Broadcast outlets ===
As part of the media rights agreement with Fox in Latin America that was announced on November 25, 2025, Eternal Glory will air live across Fox platforms in Latin America. The event will be livestreamed on WWE and AAA's YouTube channels and Facebook pages outside of Latin America.

=== Storylines ===
The event will feature professional wrestling matches that involve wrestlers from scripted feuds. The wrestlers will portray either heels (referred to as rudos in Mexico, those that play the part of the "bad guys") or faces (técnicos in Mexico, the "good guy" characters) as they perform.
