= Money in the Bank (2025) =

WWE premium live event

- Promotional poster featuring John Cena
- Promotion: WWE
- Brand(s): Raw; SmackDown
- Date: June 7, 2025
- City: Inglewood, California
- Venue: Intuit Dome
- Attendance: 17,069
- Tagline: The Last Time is Now

WWE event chronology
← Previous; Worlds Collide	Next → Night of Champions

Money in the Bank chronology
← Previous; 2024	Next → 2026

The 2025 Money in the Bank, also promoted as Money in the Bank: Los Angeles, was a professional wrestling premium live event (PLE) produced by WWE, held for wrestlers from the promotion's main roster brands, Raw and SmackDown. It was the 16th annual Money in the Bank event and took place on Saturday, June 7, 2025, at the Intuit Dome in Inglewood, California, marking the first Money in the Bank event to be held in both the U.S. state of California and the Greater Los Angeles area. The event centered on the Money in the Bank ladder match, a multi-person ladder match where the wrestlers compete to retrieve a briefcase hanging above the ring which contains a contract for a guaranteed championship match at any time within the next year.

Five matches were contested at the event. While primarily held for Raw and SmackDown, one match involved a wrestler from WWE's sister promotion Lucha Libre AAA Worldwide (AAA). In the main event, Cody Rhodes and Jey Uso defeated John Cena and Logan Paul. For the Money in the Bank ladder matches, Raw's Seth Rollins and SmackDown's Naomi won their respective matches, the latter of which was the opening bout. In the other matches on the card, Becky Lynch defeated Lyra Valkyria to win Raw's WWE Women's Intercontinental Championship, and Raw's Dominik Mysterio successfully defended the WWE Intercontinental Championship against AAA's Octagón Jr.

This event also saw a surprise appearance of R-Truth, as a week prior, it was announced that WWE would legitimately not renew his contract; it was subsequently revealed that as a result of fan backlash, his contract was renewed just before the event. This was the first Money in the Bank to broadcast on Netflix in most international markets following the WWE Network's merger under the service in January 2025 in those areas, and it would also be the last on the WWE Network in any country as the last few countries that were still on the service due to pre-existing contracts merged under Netflix on April 1, 2026. It was also the final Money in the Bank to air on Disney+ in the Philippines and Abema in Japan before they too merged under Netflix on January 1 and October 1, 2026, respectively, as well as the last to air on Peacock in the United States as ESPN's direct-to-consumer streaming service assumed the streaming rights for WWE's main roster PLEs in the US beginning in September.

== Production ==
=== Background ===
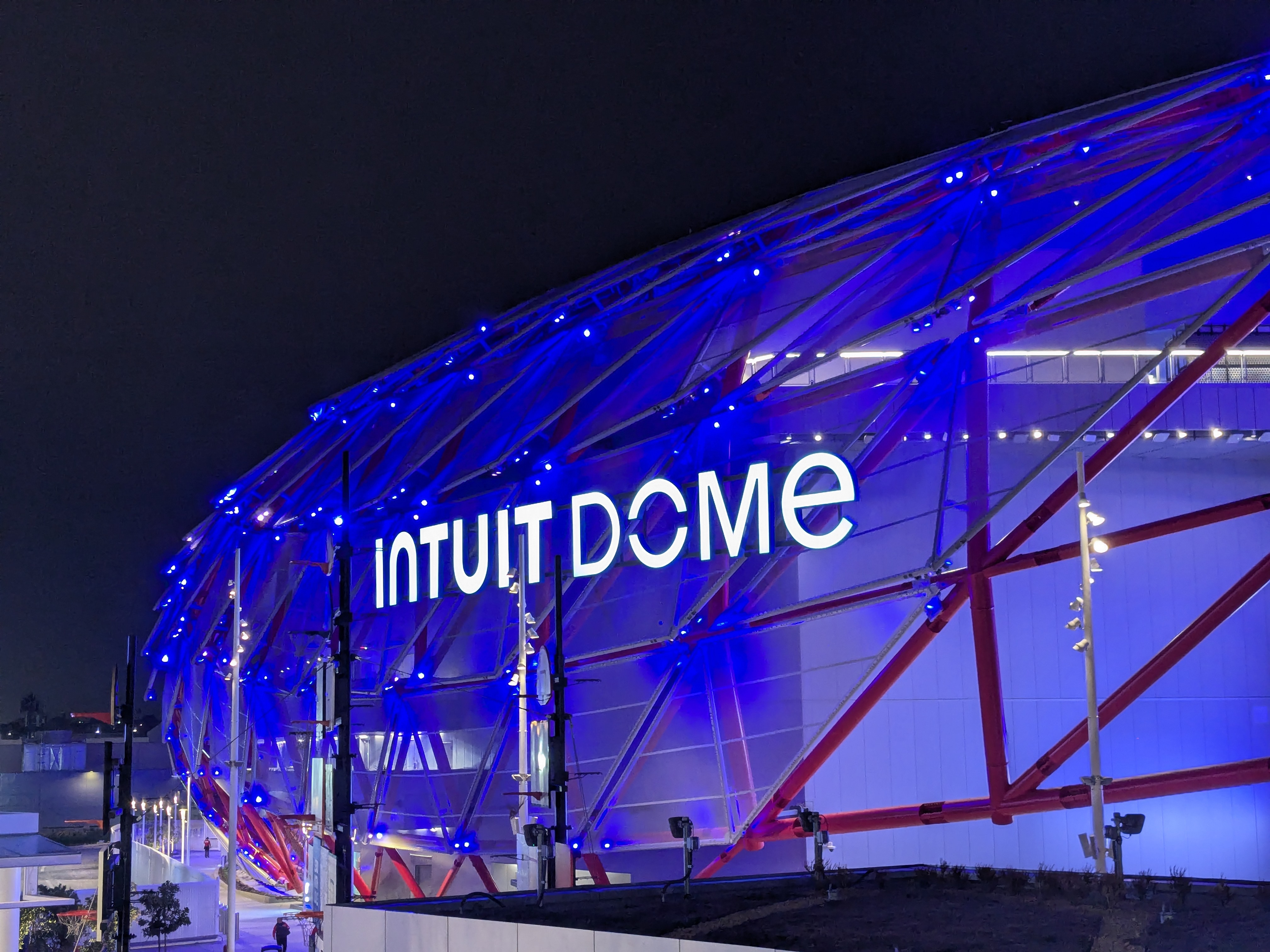
The 16th annual Money in the Bank event was held at the Intuit Dome in the Greater Los Angeles city of Inglewood, California.

Money in the Bank is an annual professional wrestling premium live event (PLE) produced by WWE since 2010, generally held between May and July. It was originally broadcast exclusively via pay-per-view (PPV) before it began simulcasting on WWE's livestreaming platforms in 2014. As of August 2021, it is considered one of the promotion's five biggest PLEs of the year, along with WrestleMania, Royal Rumble, SummerSlam, and Survivor Series, referred to as the "Big Five". The concept of the event comes from WWE's established Money in the Bank ladder match.

Announced on April 20, 2025, the 16th Money in the Bank event was scheduled to take place on Saturday, June 7, 2025, at the Intuit Dome in the Greater Los Angeles city of Inglewood, California, with the event in turn promoted as Money in the Bank: Los Angeles. This was the first Money in the Bank event to be held in the U.S. state of California as well as the first in the Greater Los Angeles area, and it was the first to be held in June since the 2018 event. As part of Money in the Bank weekend, WWE's developmental brand, NXT, along with the company's Mexican subsidiary, Lucha Libre AAA Worldwide, held Worlds Collide the same day prior to Money in the Bank at the nearby Kia Forum.

The Money in the Bank ladder match features multiple wrestlers using ladders to retrieve a briefcase hanging above the ring. The briefcase contains a contract that guarantees the winner a match for a championship at any time within the next year. The 2025 event featured wrestlers from the Raw and SmackDown brand divisions; male wrestlers competed for a contract to grant them a match for a championship of their choosing, while female wrestlers competed for a WWE Women's Championship or Women's World Championship match contract.

=== Broadcast outlets ===
Money in the Bank was broadcast on traditional PPV outlets worldwide. It was also available to livestream on Peacock in the United States, SuperSport in Sub-Saharan Africa, Disney+ in the Philippines, Abema in Japan, Netflix in most other international markets, and the WWE Network in a select few countries that had not yet transferred to Netflix due to pre-existing contracts. This marked the first Money in the Bank to livestream on Netflix following the WWE Network's merger under the service in January 2025 in those areas.

=== Storylines ===
The event included five matches that resulted from scripted storylines. Results were predetermined by WWE's writers on the Raw and SmackDown brands, while storylines were produced on WWE's weekly television shows, Monday Night Raw and Friday Night SmackDown.

Qualifying matches for the men's Money in the Bank ladder match consisted of six triple threat matches held across episodes of Raw and SmackDown, with three spots for each brand. The first qualifier occurred on the May 16 episode of SmackDown, where Solo Sikoa defeated Jimmy Uso and Rey Fénix. LA Knight qualified on the following week's SmackDown by defeating Aleister Black and Shinsuke Nakamura. Two qualifiers occurred on the May 26 episode of Raw, where Penta defeated Chad Gable and Dragon Lee, and then Seth Rollins defeated Finn Bálor and Sami Zayn. On that week's SmackDown, Andrade earned SmackDown's final spot by defeating Carmelo Hayes and Jacob Fatu, with Raw's final spot determined on the June 2 episode, where El Grande Americano defeated AJ Styles and CM Punk.

Qualifying matches for the women's Money in the Bank ladder match also consisted of six triple threat matches held across episodes of Raw and SmackDown, with three spots for each brand. The qualifiers also began on the May 16 episode of SmackDown, where Alexa Bliss defeated Chelsea Green and Michin. The next two qualifiers occurred on the May 19 episode of Raw, where Roxanne Perez defeated Becky Lynch and Natalya, and then Rhea Ripley defeated Kairi Sane and Zoey Stark. The fourth qualifier was determined on that week's SmackDown, where Giulia defeated Charlotte Flair and Zelina Vega. SmackDown's final spot was determined on the May 30 episode, where Naomi defeated Jade Cargill and Nia Jax, with Raw's final spot determined on the June 2 episode, where Stephanie Vaquer defeated Ivy Nile and Liv Morgan.

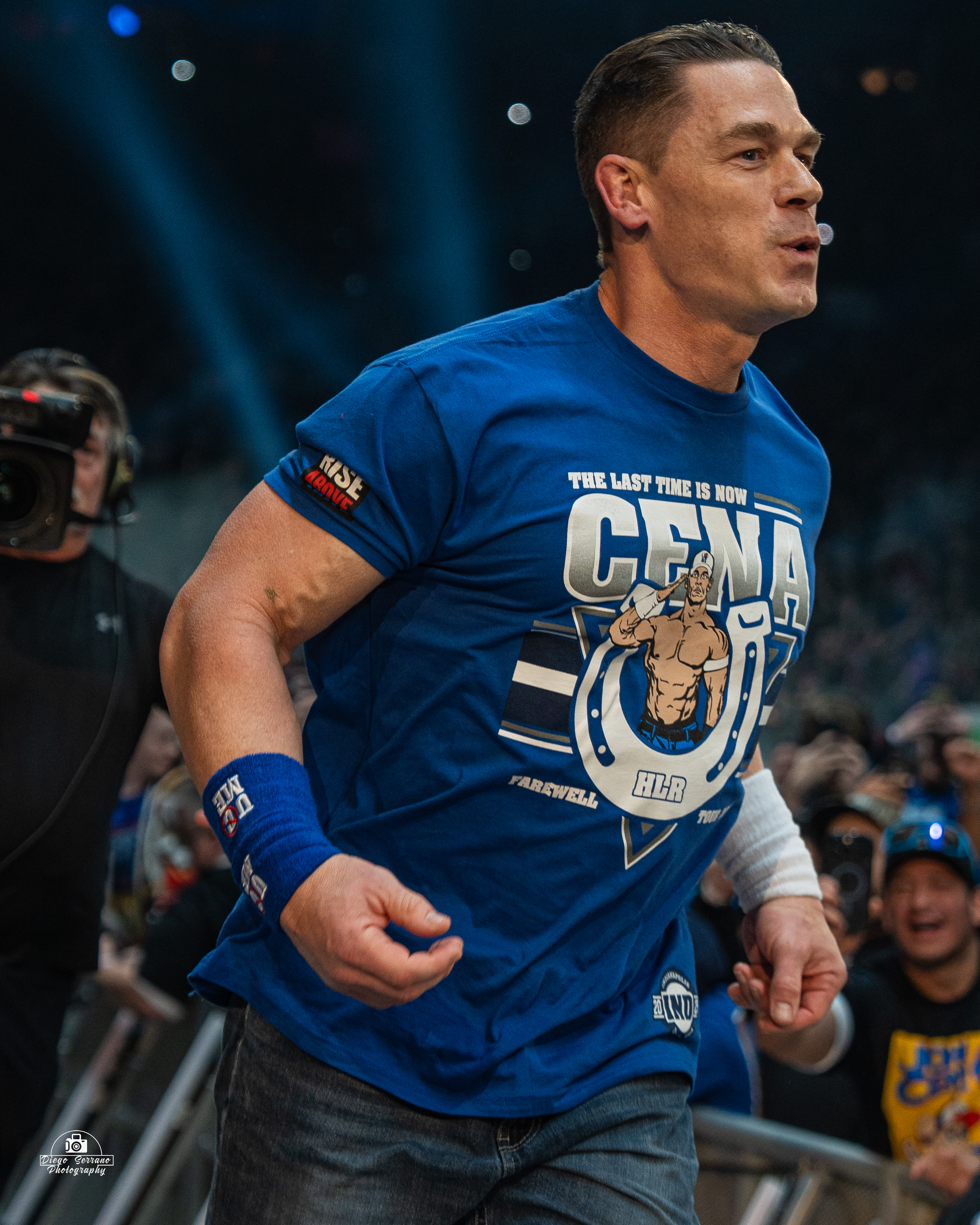
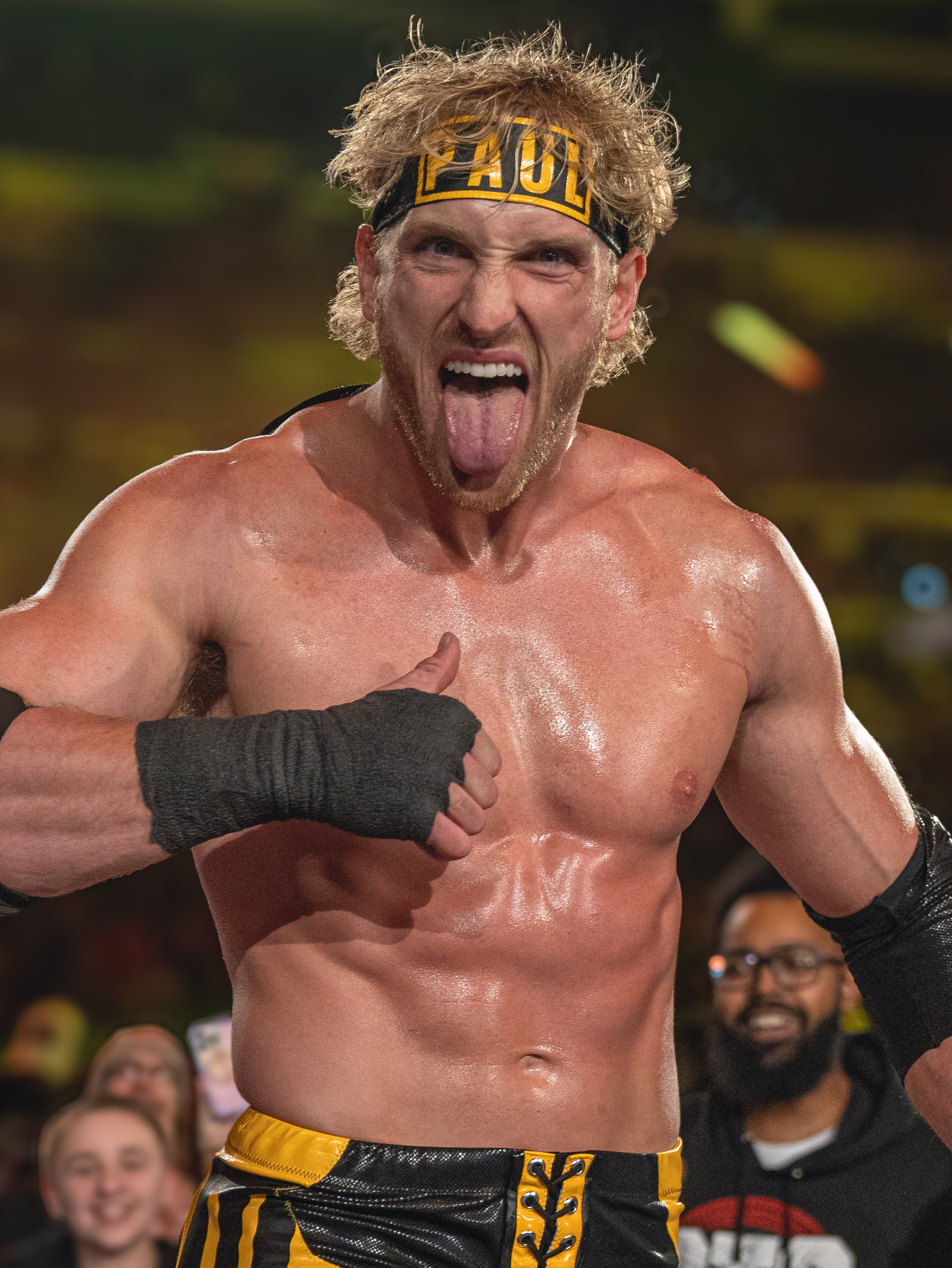
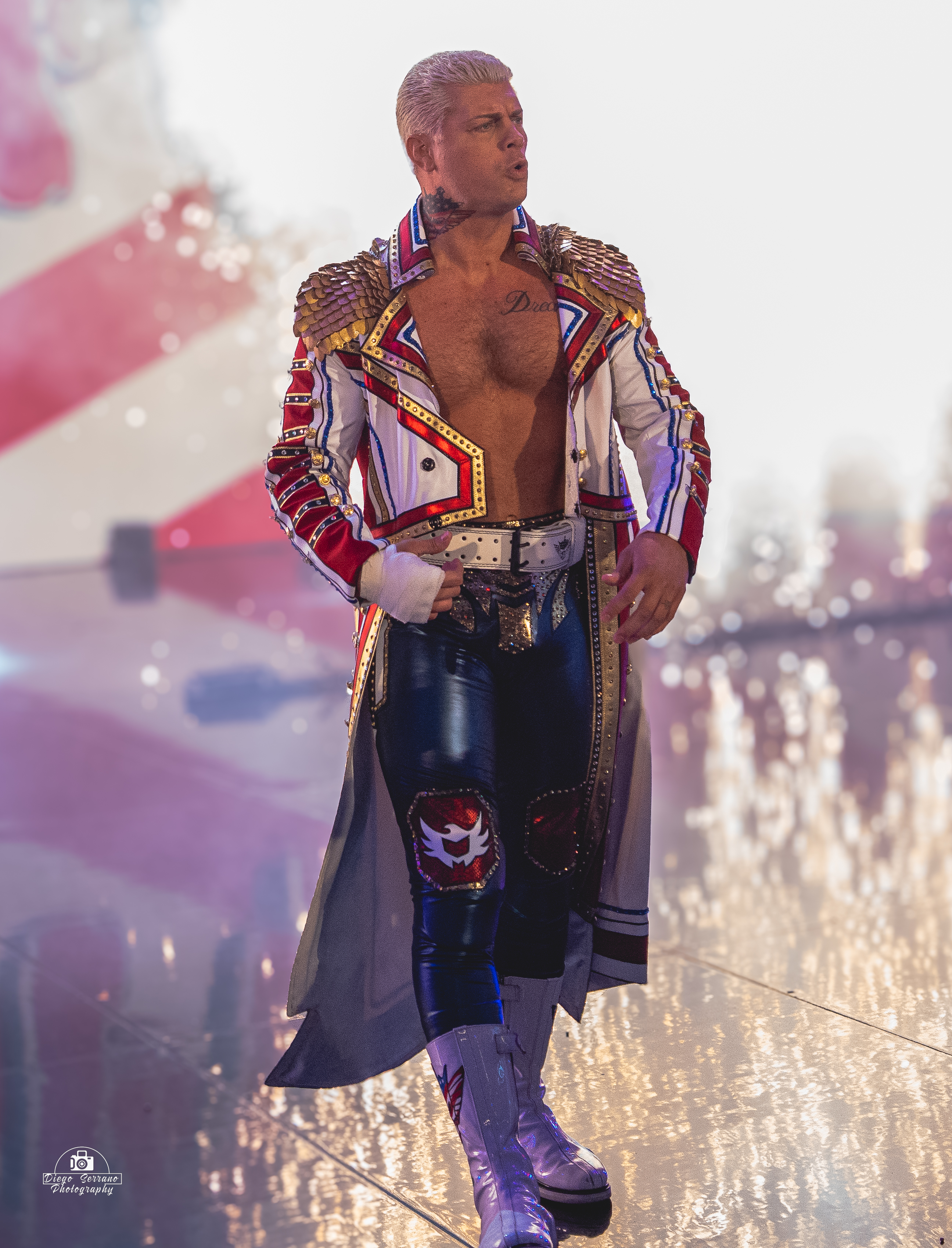
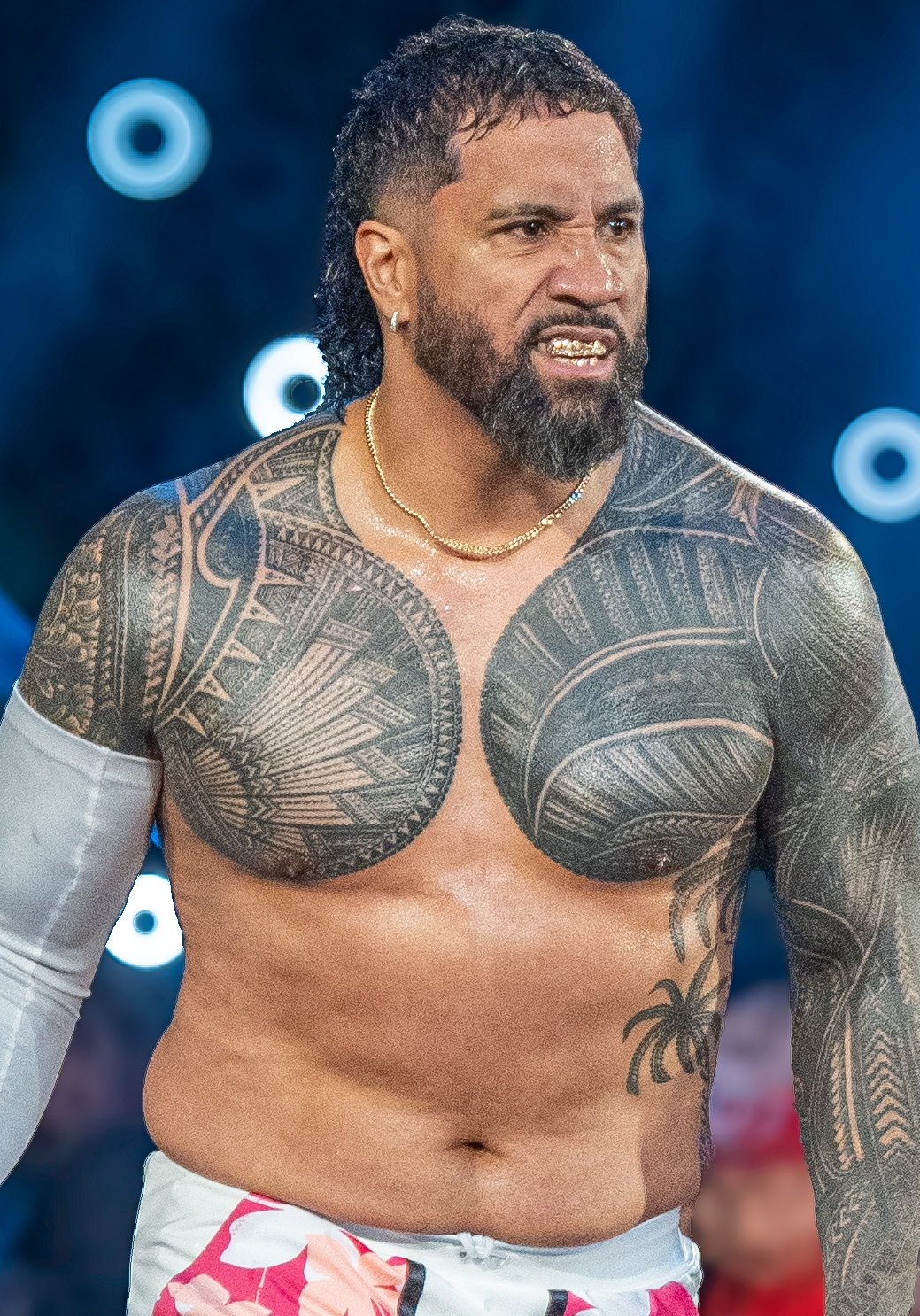
In his final match at a Money in the Bank event, SmackDown's Undisputed WWE Champion John Cena teamed with Logan Paul to face Cody Rhodes and Raw's World Heavyweight Champion Jey Uso in a tag team match in the main event.

At the Royal Rumble, Jey Uso won the men's Royal Rumble match by last eliminating John Cena. On Night 1 of WrestleMania 41, Uso won Raw's World Heavyweight Championship, while on Night 2, a now villainous Cena defeated Cody Rhodes to win SmackDown's Undisputed WWE Championship. After WrestleMania, Rhodes took a sabbatical from WWE while Uso began feuding with Logan Paul. At Saturday Night's Main Event XXXIX, Cena confronted Uso backstage prior to the latter's title defense against Paul. Cena commented on the possibility of Uso losing his title to "a YouTuber" and how that would "ruin wrestling", something Cena promised to do after declaring his intentions to retire as champion at the end of 2025. Later that night, Cena interfered in the title match on Paul's behalf, only to be thwarted by a returning Rhodes. Uso subsequently pinned Paul to retain his title. After the match, Rhodes declared that he and Uso would face Cena and Paul in a tag team match at Money in the Bank, which was subsequently made official.

On Night 2 of WrestleMania 41, Lyra Valkyria teamed with a returning Becky Lynch to win the WWE Women's Tag Team Championship, only to immediately lose the title in a rematch the next night on Raw, which infuriated Lynch, causing her to turn on Valkyria. At Backlash, Valkyria defeated Lynch to retain the WWE Women's Intercontinental Championship, but was subjected to a post-match assault by Lynch. Valkyria then cost Lynch her Money in the Bank qualifying match on the May 19 episode of Raw. On May 26, a rematch for the Women's Intercontinental Championship was scheduled for Money in the Bank. On that night's Raw, Lynch proposed a Last Chance stipulation for the match, where if Valkyria won, she would never challenge for the title again for as long as Valkyria was champion, but if Lynch won, Valkyria would have to raise her hand and recognize Lynch as the better woman, the same way that Lynch did back at NXT: Halloween Havoc in 2023 when she lost the NXT Women's Championship to Valkyria, who subsequently agreed.

Hours before Money in the Bank during the Worlds Collide event, after Octagón Jr.'s team from AAA had just won their match involving Latino World Order (LWO) members, WWE Intercontinental Champion Dominik Mysterio, who was sitting at ringside alongside Liv Morgan, interrupted the celebration and mocked Octagón Jr. for being a fan of his dad, Rey Mysterio, the LWO's leader. A brawl broke out and Dominik challenged Octagón Jr. to a match at that night's Money in the Bank, with the Intercontinental Championship on the line, which was subsequently made official.

== Event ==
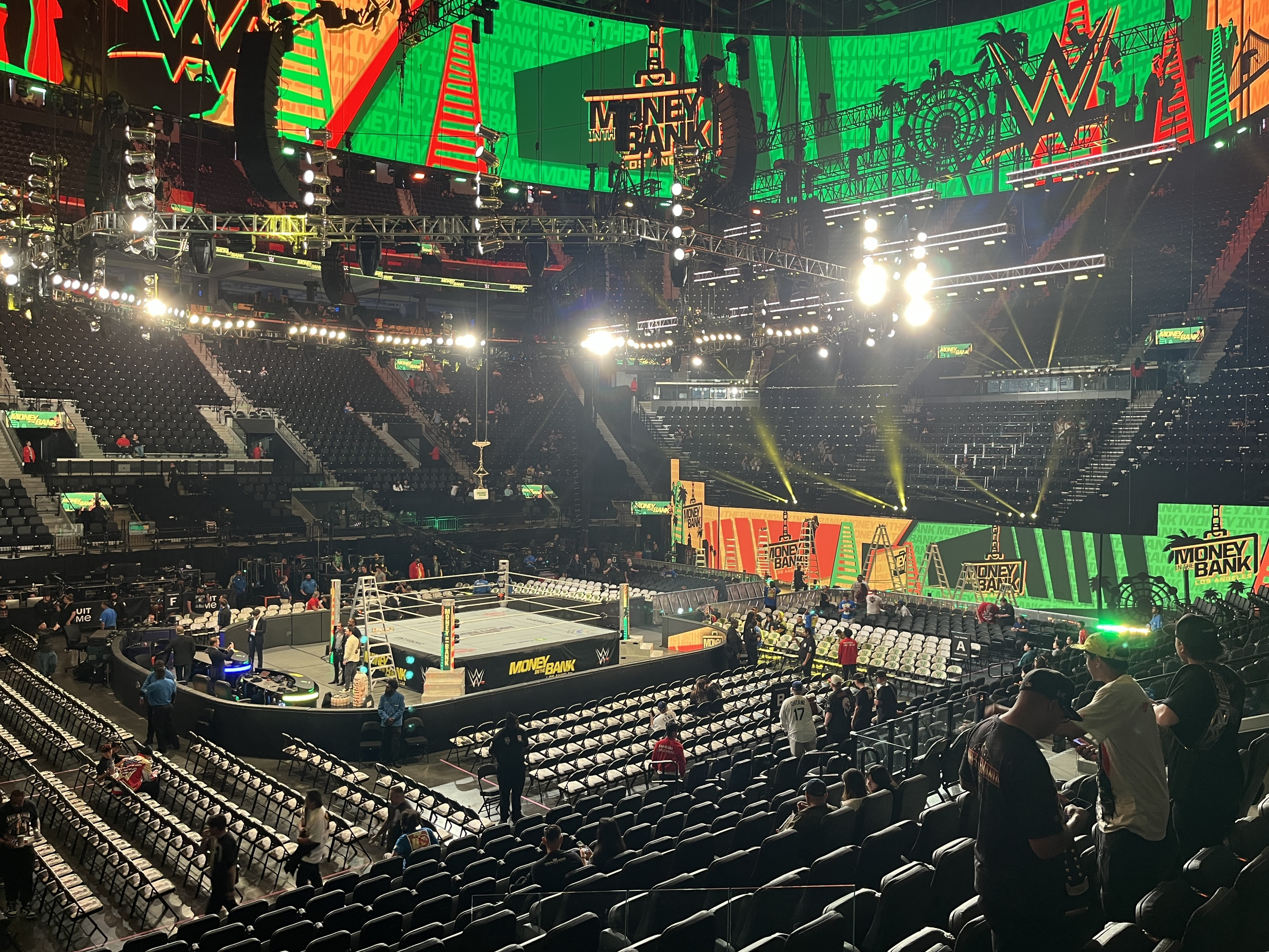
Inside Intuit Dome before the show.

Other on-screen personnel
Role:	Name:
English commentators	Michael Cole
English commentators	Wade Barrett
English commentators	Pat McAfee
Spanish commentators	Marcelo Rodríguez
Spanish commentators	Jerry Soto
Ring announcer	Alicia Taylor
Referees	Danilo Anfibio
Referees	Jason Ayers
Referees	Jessika Carr
Referees	Dan Engler
Referees	Daphanie LaShaunn
Referees	Eddie Orengo
Referees	Charles Robinson
Referees	Ryan Tran
Referees	Rod Zapata
Interviewers	Cathy Kelley
Interviewers	Byron Saxton
Pre-show panel	Vic Joseph
Pre-show panel	Big E
Pre-show panel	Peter Rosenberg

=== Preliminary matches ===
The PLE opened with the women's Money in the Bank ladder match, featuring Roxanne Perez, Rhea Ripley, and Stephanie Vaquer from Raw, and Alexa Bliss, Giulia, and Naomi from SmackDown. Early in the match, Perez and Giulia incapacitated Ripley by burying her under a pile of ladders outside the ring. Upon re-entering the match, Ripley dominated several competitors and used a bridged ladder as a weapon. Vaquer countered Ripley's momentum with repeated attacks before climbing a ladder in an attempt to retrieve the briefcase, but she was intercepted by Perez, Bliss, and Naomi. A sequence of simultaneous Code Red powerbombs by Bliss and Perez drove Naomi and Vaquer onto bridged ladders. As Giulia and Perez fought atop a ladder, Bliss intervened, and Ripley delivered a Riptide to Giulia. Bliss executed a Sister Abigail on Perez before she and Ripley fought atop the ladder. Ultimately, Naomi tipped the ladder, sending both to the mat, and ascended to unhook the briefcase and win the match.

In the second match, Dominik Mysterio (accompanied by Liv Morgan) defended the Intercontinental Championship against Octagón Jr. As Octagón Jr climbed the top rope, he was distracted by Morgan, allowing Mysterio to perform a 619 and a Frog Splash to win the match and retain the title.

The third match saw Lyra Valkyria defend the Women's Intercontinental Championship against Becky Lynch. Midway through the match, Valkyria performed a guillotine leg drop on Lynch off the announce table. Lynch delivered a Manhandle Slam from the middle rope for a near fall. Valkyria executed her signature Nightwing outside the ring. In the closing moments, Lynch performed a roll-up while holding Valkyria's tights to win the title. After the match, per the stipulation, Valkyria raised Lynch's hand before attacking her with another Nightwing.

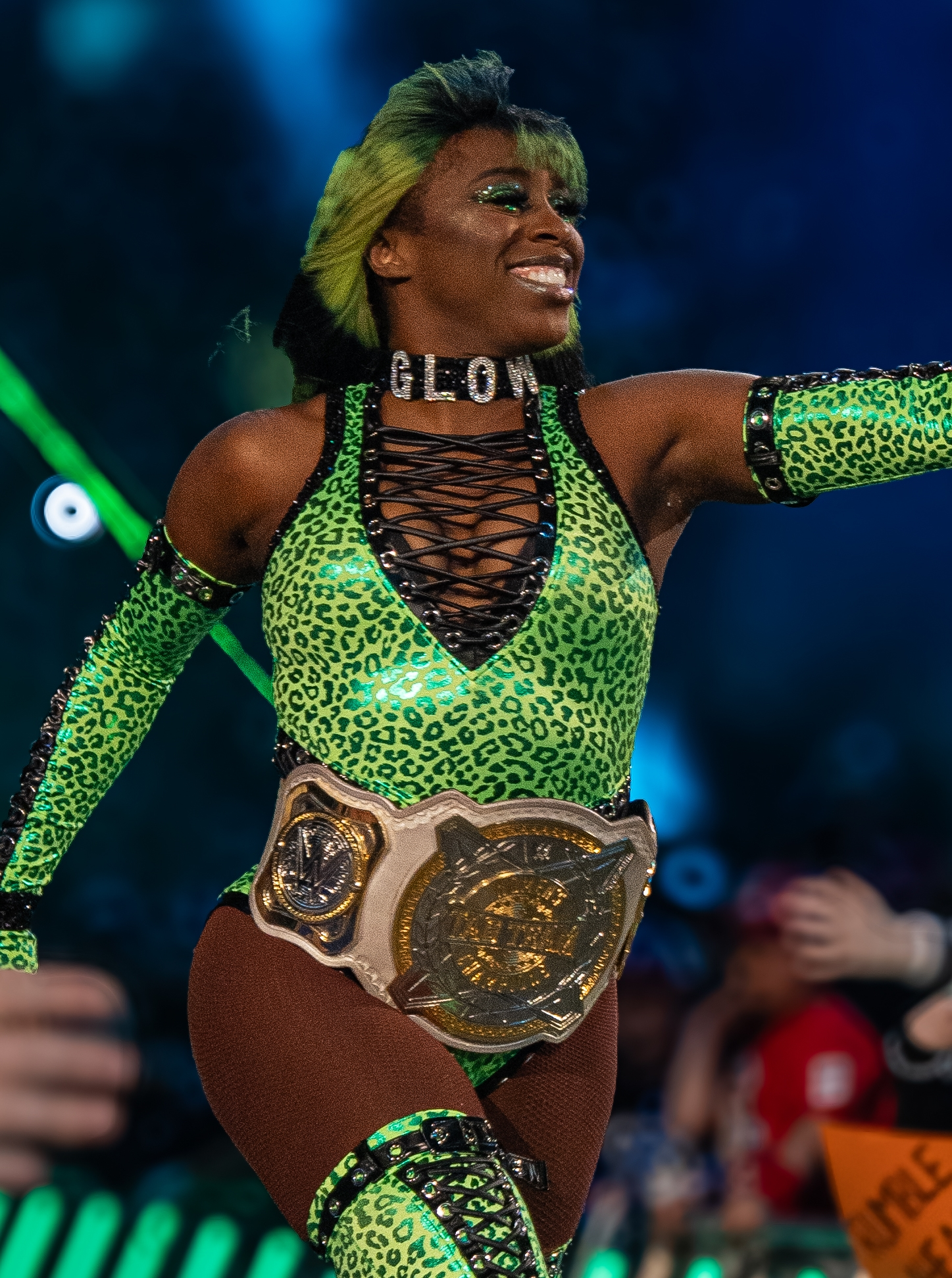
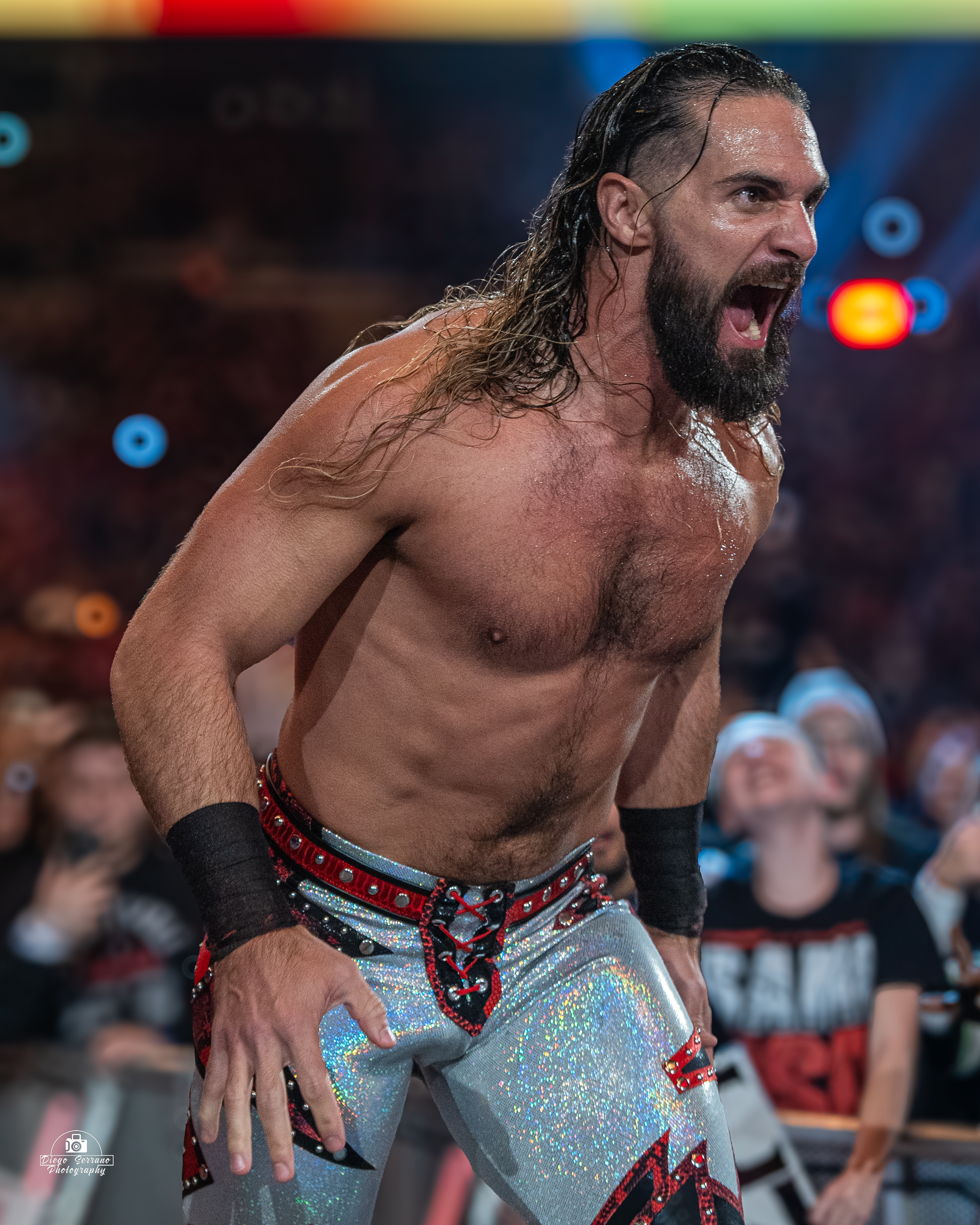
Naomi and Seth Rollins were the respective winners of the 2025 Women's and Men's Money in the Bank ladder matches.

The penultimate match was the men's Money in the Bank ladder match, featuring Seth Rollins, Penta, and El Grande Americano from Raw, and Andrade, Solo Sikoa, and LA Knight from SmackDown. The match featured multiple high-risk maneuvers, including a sunset flip powerbomb by Andrade, a Mexican Destroyer by Penta, and a series of superplexes involving several competitors. Americano introduced a Fireball branded ladder and used it as a weapon against the participants. Interference from two factions occurred late in the match, with Bron Breakker and Bronson Reed assisting Rollins, and The Bloodline's WWE United States Champion Jacob Fatu and JC Mateo intervening on behalf of Sikoa. However, Fatu turned on Sikoa, attacking him and performing a Spinning Solo through a ladder bridge. Rollins delivered a curb stomp to Knight and unhooked the briefcase to win the match, becoming a two-time Money in the Bank winner.

=== Main event ===
The main event was a tag team match pitting Cody Rhodes and World Heavyweight Champion Jey Uso against Undisputed WWE Champion John Cena and Logan Paul. Rhodes and Uso controlled the early portion of the match before Cena and Paul isolated Uso to gain momentum. Midway through the match, tensions between Cena and Paul surfaced and they began shoving each other. Paul accidentally hit Cena with a springboard splash. Rhodes delivered a superplex to Paul, followed by an Uso Splash as Paul operated a drone camera. Uso speared Cena off the announce table. Paul later performed a springboard moonsault on Uso through the announce table, taking both men out of the match. As the referee tended to the fallen participants, Cena used his championship belt to strike Rhodes. Before he could capitalize, a hooded figure attacked him. The individual was revealed to be R-Truth, whose contract had recently legitimately expired, who struck Cena with the title belt and subsequently fled through the crowd. Rhodes recovered and pinned Cena after a Cross Rhodes to win the match.

== Reception ==
Mike Tedesco of WrestleView called the women's Money in the Bank ladder match "overall pretty good" with "some good moments for some of the young stars, particularly Stephanie Vaquer and Roxanne Perez". Shakiel Mahjouri of CBS Sports gave it a grade of B+, calling it a "solid ladder match that showcased WWE's evolving women's scene", with Naomi being a "reliable choice who can benefit from the briefcase". Wade Keller of Pro Wrestling Torch called it "an exciting, overall solid ladder match with a few dangerous looking moves and nice pacing without overdoing it".

For the men's Money in the Bank ladder match, Keller called it "exciting start to finish", and "Seth winning made sense since it give [sic] the new Heyman/Seth faction extra juice this summer and no one else was an obvious person to hold it and credibly cash in, although there were fun theories and speculation El Grande Americano winning but someone else cashing it under the Americano mask". Although "not everything was smooth", it was a "satisfying, epic feel overall". Tedesco called it "very good and newsworthy" with "some really awesome spots and not a lot of dead air in this". Mahjouri gave it a grade of A, calling it "one of the best Money in the Bank ladder matches in recent memory" with multiple storylines "incorporated and advanced", Rollins being a major threat with the briefcase, and terrific high spots.

For the main event, Keller called it "spotty with some highs and some long stretches of lows", but R-Truth's return "overrides pretty much anything else". Mahjouri gave it a grade of A+, stating that although "it wasn't a technical classic", "the back half was great sports entertainment" with a "clever" drone spot, a perfect springboard moonsault by Paul, and R-Truth's return being "one of the best surprises in recent memory. If wrestling is about moments, you won't find many better ones this year". Tedesco called it "excellent", and "for the first part, it felt like a house show tag match, but it picked up in a big way". He called Money in the Bank "pretty good" and "not a bad way to spend a Saturday night".

Dave Meltzer, writing for the Wrestling Observer Newsletter, rated the women's and men's Money in the Bank ladder matches at 3.5 stars and 4.5 stars respectively, the Intercontinental Championship match at 2 stars, the Women's Intercontinental Championship match at 3.5 stars, and the main event at 3.5 stars.

== Aftermath ==
The following year's Money in the Bank event was the first to be held in October, also making it the latest calendar date for the event.

=== Raw ===
Undisputed WWE Champion John Cena opened the following episode of Raw to talk about R-Truth's return, but was interrupted by CM Punk, who came to defend the audience. Punk then set his sights on winning the title from Cena, and Cena announced that the match would take place at Night of Champions, before being interrupted by the men's Money in the Bank contract holder Seth Rollins. At Night of Champions, Cena successfully defended the Undisputed WWE Championship against Punk after interference from Rollins, Bron Breakker, and Bronson Reed. On Night 1 of SummerSlam, Rollins cashed in the Money in the Bank contract on Punk to win the World Heavyweight Championship.

Also on Raw, R-Truth thanked the fans for making their voices heard before cutting off his hair and ending the R-Truth character, now being known as Ron Killings.

As the new Women's Intercontinental Champion Becky Lynch was addressing her title win, she was interrupted by Lyra Valkyria. However, before Valkyria could confront Lynch, Lynch was attacked by a returning Bayley, who had been out of action since April due to a backstage attack by Lynch prior to Lynch's return at WrestleMania 41. On the June 23 episode of Raw, Bayley faced Lynch for the title, but the match ended in a disqualification victory for Lynch after interference from Valkyria. The following week, Bayley and Valkyria faced each other to determine who would challenge Lynch for the title, but the match ended in a double pinfall. This led to a triple threat match for the Women's Intercontinental Championship at Evolution, where Lynch retained.

=== SmackDown ===
Undisputed WWE Champion John Cena opened the subsequent episode of SmackDown addressing the events of Money in the Bank and the following episode of Raw, before being interrupted and confronted by Cody Rhodes, Randy Orton (who Cena had controversially defeated at Backlash), and LA Knight. As Cena was leaving, he was ambushed and attacked by Ron Killings. An irate Cena would return to the ring later that night to address the attack by Killings, only to be interrupted by his Night of Champions opponent CM Punk. After their confrontation, Cena was again attacked by Killings. As a result, a non-title match between Cena and Killings was scheduled for the June 20 episode of SmackDown. The match ended when Cena got himself disqualified by hitting Killings with the title belt. After the match, Punk attacked Cena, but Cena performed a low blow and an Attitude Adjustment on Punk through a table before cutting a "pipe bomb" promo on Punk, similar to how Punk delivered his own "pipe bomb" on Cena 14 years prior.

United States Champion Jacob Fatu talked about his betrayal of Solo Sikoa and The Bloodline, before being interrupted by Sikoa, who stated that he was ready to forgive Fatu, but also threatened to take Fatu out. The following week, Sikoa apologized to Fatu, who did not accept it, and stated that Sikoa changed since Fatu won the title. Fatu then challenged Sikoa to a match for the title, however, Sikoa tried to attack Fatu, who prevented it. JC Mateo joined Sikoa in attacking Fatu, who got the upper hand after an assist from Jimmy Uso. Later that night, Fatu announced that after speaking with SmackDown General Manager Nick Aldis, he would defend the title against Sikoa at Night of Champions, where Fatu lost the title to Sikoa after interference from the returning Tonga Loa and the debuting Talla Tonga.

Women's Money in the Bank contact holder Naomi talked about her win at Money in the Bank and the prospect of cashing in on WWE Women's Champion Tiffany Stratton, before being interrupted by Stratton. After a back-and-forth exchange on the mic, Stratton was attacked by Nia Jax. The following week, a Last Woman Standing match between Stratton and Jax for the title was scheduled for the June 27 episode, where Stratton retained. At Evolution, Naomi cashed in the Money in the Bank contract on Iyo Sky to win the Women's World Championship.

=== Broadcasting changes ===
In continuing WWE's near worldwide transition to Netflix, this would be the final Money in the Bank to air on Disney+ in the Philippines and Abema in Japan before moving to Netflix on January 1 and October 1, 2026, respectively. Throughout 2025, many of the select few countries that were still on the WWE Network due to pre-existing contracts gradually merged to Netflix with nearly all international markets on Netflix by January 1, 2026. The last few remaining countries that were still on the WWE Network merged under Netflix on April 1, 2026, making this 2025 event the last Money in the Bank to air on the WWE Network in any country. Additionally, on August 6, 2025, WWE announced that ESPN's direct-to-consumer streaming service would assume the streaming rights of WWE's main roster PLEs in the United States. This was originally to begin with WrestleMania 42 in April 2026, but was pushed up to September 2025 with Wrestlepalooza. As such, this was the last Money in the Bank to livestream on Peacock in the US.

== Results ==
No.	Results	Stipulations	Times
1	Naomi defeated Alexa Bliss, Giulia, Rhea Ripley, Roxanne Perez, and Stephanie Vaquer by retrieving the briefcase	Money in the Bank ladder match for a women's championship match contract	25:15
2	Dominik Mysterio (c) (with Liv Morgan) defeated Octagón Jr. by pinfall	Singles match for the WWE Intercontinental Championship	4:55
3	Becky Lynch defeated Lyra Valkyria (c) by pinfall	Last Chance match for the WWE Women's Intercontinental Championship; Since Valkyria lost, she was forced to raise Lynch's hand and acknowledge her as the better woman. Had Lynch lost, she would have never been able to challenge for the title again for as long as Valkyria was champion.	15:20
4	Seth Rollins (with Paul Heyman) defeated Andrade, El Grande Americano, LA Knight, Penta, and Solo Sikoa by retrieving the briefcase	Money in the Bank ladder match for a men's championship match contract	33:35
5	Cody Rhodes and Jey Uso defeated John Cena and Logan Paul by pinfall	Tag team match	23:45
(c) / – the champion(s) heading into the match
