= WWE Worlds Collide (series) =

WWE streaming television program

- Created by: Vince McMahon
- Presented by: Tom Phillips; Aiden English
- Starring: WWE roster
- Country of origin: United States
- No. of episodes: 4

Production
- Camera setup: Multicamera setup

Original release
- Network: WWE Network
- Release: April 14 – May 1, 2019

Related
- WWE Raw; WWE SmackDown; WWE 205 Live; WWE NXT; WWE Main Event; NXT UK

WWE Worlds Collide, or simply Worlds Collide, is a professional wrestling streaming television program. It was produced by WWE and featured interbrand competition between wrestlers from WWE's then-five brand divisions: Raw, SmackDown, NXT, NXT UK, and 205 Live. The program premiered on the WWE Network on April 14, 2019, and aired as a four-episode series, with the final episode airing on May 1, 2019. It was a follow-up to the 2019 Worlds Collide Tournament.

== History ==
On January 26 and 27, 2019, during Royal Rumble Axxess, WWE filmed the Worlds Collide special. The special featured a tournament with wrestlers from WWE's NXT, NXT UK, and 205 Live brands.

On March 28, 2019, WWE announced that Worlds Collide would return during April's WrestleMania Axxess festival. In addition to the three brands previously featured at the Worlds Collide special, wrestlers from the Raw and SmackDown brands would also participate in the events. On April 9, WWE announced that these events would air as a four-episode streaming television series on the WWE Network starting on April 14, under the title, WWE Worlds Collide. The series was taped on April 6–7 at Pier 12 in Brooklyn, New York and aired on April 14, 17, 24, and May 1.

== Episodes ==
=== April 14, 2019 ===
No.	Results	Stipulations
1	Kassius Ohno (NXT UK) defeated Aiden English (SmackDown)	Singles match
2	Harper (SmackDown) defeated Dominik Dijakovic (NXT)	Singles match
3	The Undisputed Era (Kyle O'Reilly and Bobby Fish) (NXT) defeated Sanity (Alexander Wolfe and Killian Dain) (SmackDown)	Tag team match
4	Tyler Breeze (Raw) defeated Roderick Strong (NXT)	Singles match

=== April 17, 2019 ===
No.	Results	Stipulations
1	Tyler Bate (NXT UK) defeated The Brian Kendrick (205 Live)	Singles match
2	Flash Morgan Webster and Mark Andrews (NXT UK) defeated Ariya Daivari and Mike Kanellis (205 Live)	Tag team match
3	Ligero (NXT UK) defeated Gran Metalik (Raw) and Albert Hardie Jr. (NXT)	Triple threat match
4	Jordan Devlin (NXT UK) defeated Akira Tozawa (205 Live)	Singles match

=== April 24, 2019 ===
No.	Results	Stipulations
1	Candice LeRae (NXT) defeated Kay Lee Ray (NXT UK)	Singles match
2	Piper Niven (NXT UK) defeated Zelina Vega (SmackDown)	Singles match
3	Sonya Deville (SmackDown) defeated Io Shirai (NXT)	Singles match
4	Toni Storm (NXT UK) defeated Nikki Cross (SmackDown) and Bianca Belair (NXT)	Triple threat match

=== May 1, 2019 ===
No.	Results	Stipulations	Times
1	Bianca Belair (NXT) won by last eliminating Io Shirai (NXT)	Women's battle royal	5:15
2	Roderick Strong (NXT) won by last eliminating Tyler Bate (NXT UK)	Men's battle royal	16:16
