= Worlds Collide (June 2025) =

WWE and AAA premium live event

- Promotional poster featuring various wrestlers
- Promotion(s): WWE; Lucha Libre AAA Worldwide
- Brand(s): Raw; SmackDown; NXT
- Date: June 7, 2025
- City: Inglewood, California
- Venue: Kia Forum
- Attendance: 10,825

Pay-per-view chronology
← Previous; WWE: NXT Battleground; AAA: Rey de Reyes	Next → WWE: Money in the Bank; AAA: Triplemanía Regia III

Worlds Collide chronology
← Previous; 2022	Next → September 2025

The June 2025 Worlds Collide, retroactively known as Worlds Collide: Los Angeles, was a professional wrestling livestreaming event and supercard co-produced by the American promotion WWE and its Mexican sister promotion Lucha Libre AAA Worldwide (AAA). It was the fourth Worlds Collide and was held for wrestlers from WWE's Raw, SmackDown, and NXT brand divisions, and those from AAA, and also featured wrestlers from Total Nonstop Action Wrestling (TNA), a partner promotion of both WWE and AAA. The event took place on Saturday, June 7, 2025, at the Kia Forum in the Greater Los Angeles city of Inglewood, California and was based around direct competition between wrestlers from WWE, AAA, and TNA.

The event was held as part of Money in the Bank weekend, occurring the same day as that PLE with a special start time of 12:00 p.m. Pacific Time (3:00 p.m. Eastern Time). It was livestreamed for free on WWE's YouTube channel with both English and Spanish language commentary. Five matches were contested at the event. In the main event, AAA's El Hijo del Vikingo defeated Raw's Chad Gable to retain the AAA Mega Championship. In other prominent matches, NXT's Ethan Page defeated NXT's Je'Von Evans, TNA's Laredo Kid, and SmackDown's Rey Fénix in a fatal four-way match to retain the NXT North American Championship and the NXT team of Stephanie Vaquer and Lola Vice defeated the AAA team of Chik Tormenta and Dalys in a tag team match.

This was the first Worlds Collide event held since 2022 and the first WWE event to feature AAA wrestlers since the 1997 Royal Rumble. It was subsequently WWE's first event to officially promote AAA since WWE had signed a letter of intent to acquire the company in April 2025, but at the time of ths event, it had not been formalized; WWE announced in official documentation that the deal was expected to close in the third quarter of 2025. This was also the first of two Worlds Collide events held in 2025, with the second occurring in September in Las Vegas.

== Production ==
=== Background ===
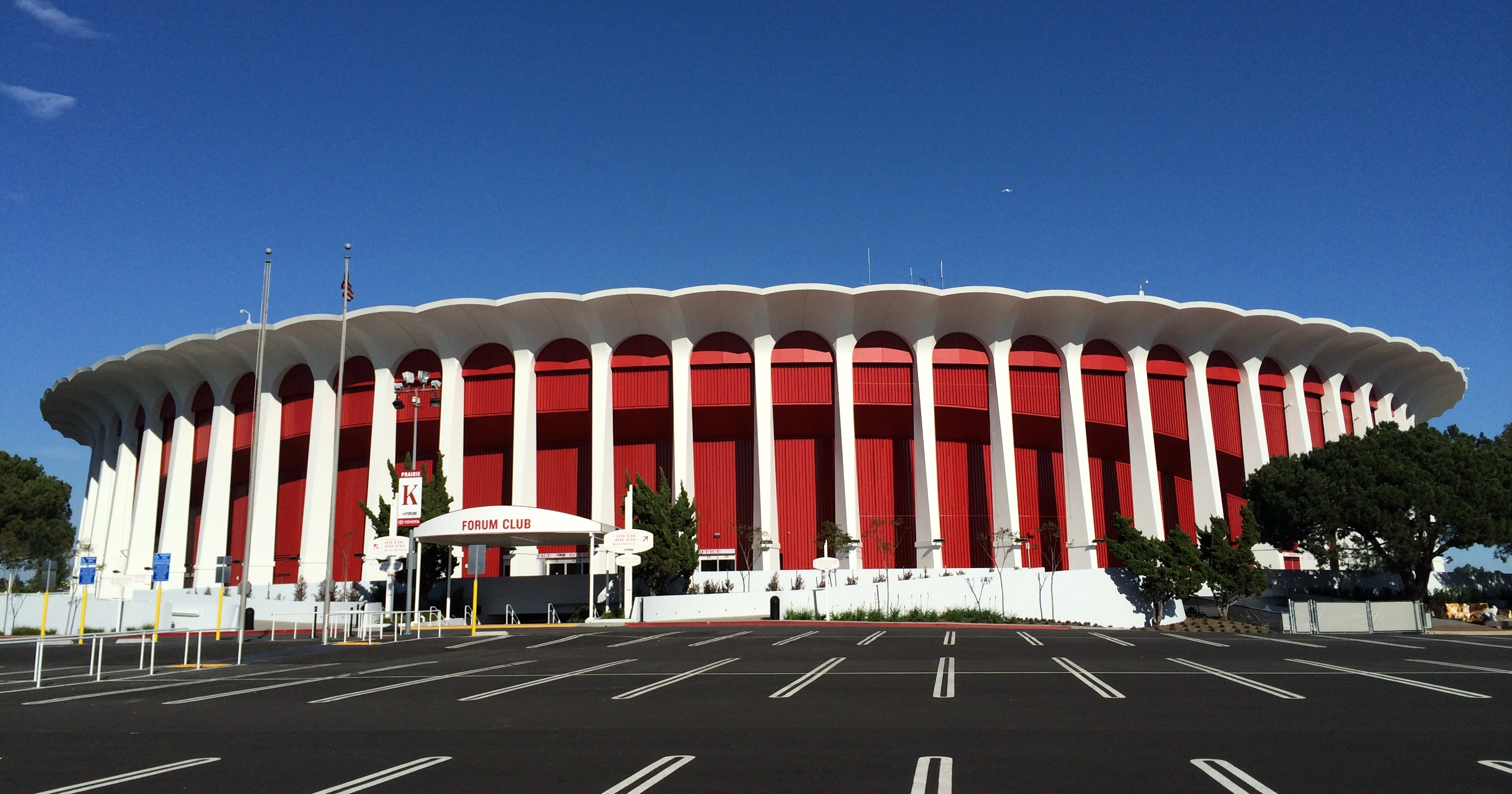
The fourth Worlds Collide was held at the Kia Forum in the Greater Los Angeles city of Inglewood, California.

Worlds Collide is a series of professional wrestling premium live events (PLE) produced by WWE since 2019 and feature direct competition between wrestlers from the promotion's various brands. On April 19, 2025, WWE announced that a fourth Worlds Collide event—and the first since 2022—would be held on Saturday, June 7, 2025, at the Kia Forum in the Greater Los Angeles city of Inglewood, California, in collaboration with the Mexican promotion Lucha Libre AAA Worldwide (AAA). Later that same day during the Countdown to WrestleMania 41 Saturday pre-show, WWE announced that it had acquired AAA.

This Worlds Collide event was held as part of Money in the Bank weekend, occurring the same day prior to that PLE, held at Inglewood's Intuit Dome. As such, Worlds Collide had a special start time of 12:00 p.m. Pacific Time (3:00 p.m. Eastern Time) and it was livestreamed for free on WWE's YouTube channel with both English and Spanish commentary. In addition to wrestlers from WWE's developmental brand, NXT, and AAA, the show also featured wrestlers from WWE's main roster brands, Raw and SmackDown. There was also involvement of wrestlers from WWE and AAA's partner promotion, Total Nonstop Action Wrestling (TNA), marking the first Worlds Collide to feature TNA wrestlers. This subsequently marked WWE's first event to officially promote AAA following its intent to acquire the company, and WWE's first event in general to feature AAA wrestlers since the 1997 Royal Rumble.

=== Storylines ===
Other on-screen personnel
Role:	Name:
English commentators	Corey Graves
English commentators	Konnan
Spanish commentators	Marcelo Rodríguez
Spanish commentators	José Manuel Guillén
Spanish commentators	Roberto Figueroa
Ring announcer	Lilian Garcia
Interviewers	Vero Rodríguez
Interviewers	Chuey Martinez

The event included five matches that resulted from scripted storylines. Results were predetermined by writers of the participating promotions, while storylines were produced on WWE's weekly television programs, Raw, SmackDown, and NXT, as well as at other WWE and AAA events.

Over the few months prior to Worlds Collide, there was dissension between Legado del Fantasma's Berto and the stable's leader Santos Escobar, with Angel attempting to keep the peace. On the May 23 episode of SmackDown, in an attempt to resolve their issues, Escobar announced that Legado del Fantasma would be teaming up at Worlds Collide, subsequently being announced that they would face one-half of The Crash Tag Team Champions El Hijo de Dr. Wagner Jr., Pagano, and Psycho Clown from AAA in a six-man tag team match.

At Battleground, NXT General Manager Ava announced that the winner of the NXT North American Championship match on the May 27 episode of NXT between champion Ricky Saints and Ethan Page would defend the title at Worlds Collide. There, Page won the championship, and later that night during Page's celebration, he was interrupted by Je'Von Evans, AAA/TNA's World Cruiserweight Champion Laredo Kid, and SmackDown's Rey Fenix, with all announcing that they would face Page for the championship at Worlds Collide, making it a fatal four-way match.

At Battleground, AAA's Dalys and Chik Tormenta were seen talking backstage with NXT General Manager Ava, and later, both were in the crowd watching Stephanie Vaquer's successful NXT Women's Championship defense. Later that night, an argument took place between Vaquer against Dalys and Tormenta. Two days later on NXT, Ava announced that Vaquer would face Dalys and Tormenta in a tag team match at Worlds Collide. Lola Vice then appeared and volunteered to be Vaquer's tag team partner at the event, which Vaquer accepted. The match was subsequently made official.

== Reception ==
The event set WWE's record for the largest live audience for a YouTube broadcast with 764,389 viewers, peaking during the main event match.

Dave Meltzer of the Wrestling Observer Newsletter rated the Octagón Jr., Aero Star, and Mr. Iguana vs. LWO and Lince Dorado match 4.25 stars, the women's tag team match 2 stars, Legado Del Fantasma vs. Wagner Jr., Pagano, and Psycho Clown 3.5 stars, the NXT North American Championship fatal four-way match 4.5 stars, and the AAA Mega Championship match 4.75 stars.

== Results ==
No.	Results	Stipulations	Times
1	Octagón Jr., Aero Star, and Mr. Iguana defeated Latino World Order (Dragon Lee and Cruz Del Toro) and Lince Dorado (Note: Originally, Latino World Order's Joaquin Wilde was scheduled to compete in this match; however, after suffering an injury during a Speed taping on June 2, it was announced a day later on NXT that he would be replaced by Dorado.) by pinfall	Six-man tag team match	14:10
2	Stephanie Vaquer and Lola Vice defeated Chik Tormenta and Dalys by pinfall	Tag team match	9:35
3	Legado Del Fantasma (Santos Escobar, Angel, and Berto) defeated El Hijo de Dr. Wagner Jr., Pagano, and Psycho Clown by pinfall	Six-man tag team match	15:00
4	Ethan Page (c) defeated Je'Von Evans, Laredo Kid, and Rey Fénix by pinfall	Fatal four-way match for the NXT North American Championship	14:55
5	El Hijo del Vikingo (c) defeated Chad Gable by pinfall	Singles match for the AAA Mega Championship	22:00
(c) / – the champion(s) heading into the match
