= Verano de Escándalo (2026) =

AAA professional wrestling event

- Promotional poster featuring various AAA and WWE wrestlers
- Promotion(s): Lucha Libre AAA Worldwide; WWE (Note: WWE handled the production of this event.)
- Date: July 25, 2026 (Aired July 25 – August 8)
- City: Aguascalientes, Aguascalientes, Mexico
- Venue: Arena San Marcos

Event chronology
← Previous; Noche de Los Grandes	Next → Ola de Calor

Verano de Escándalo chronology
← Previous; 2025	Next → —

The 2026 Verano de Escándalo (Spanish for "Summer of Scandal") was a professional wrestling livestreaming and television special event produced by Mexican professional wrestling promotion Lucha Libre AAA Worldwide (AAA), in partnership with its parent company WWE. The event took place on Saturday, July 25, 2026, at Arena San Marcos in Aguascalientes, Aguascalientes, Mexico. It was the 26th Verano de Escándalo promoted by AAA since 1997 and the first Verano de Escándalo after WWE's ownership of AAA took effect in August 2025. It aired as a three-week event, every Saturday on episodes of Lucha Libre AAA from July 25 to August 8.

Eight matches were contested at the event. In the main event of Week 1, Los Perros del Mal (Daga and Angel) defeated Los Gringos Locos 2.0 (AAA Mega Champion Dominik Mysterio and El Grande Americano). In other prominent matches, La Hiedra and Laredo Kid defeated Lola Vice and Mr. Iguana to win the AAA World Mixed Tag Team Championship, La Parka and El Fiscal advanced to the final of the AAA Latin American Championship Tournament, Rey Fénix defeated Mini Vikingo to retain the AAA World Cruiserweight Championship, and Flammer defeated La Catalina and Lady Shani in a triple threat match to retain the AAA Reina de Reinas Championship. The event also saw AAA Mega Champion Dominik Mysterio joining the El Ojo stable and Damián 666 officially rejoining Los Perros del Mal.

== Production ==
=== Background ===
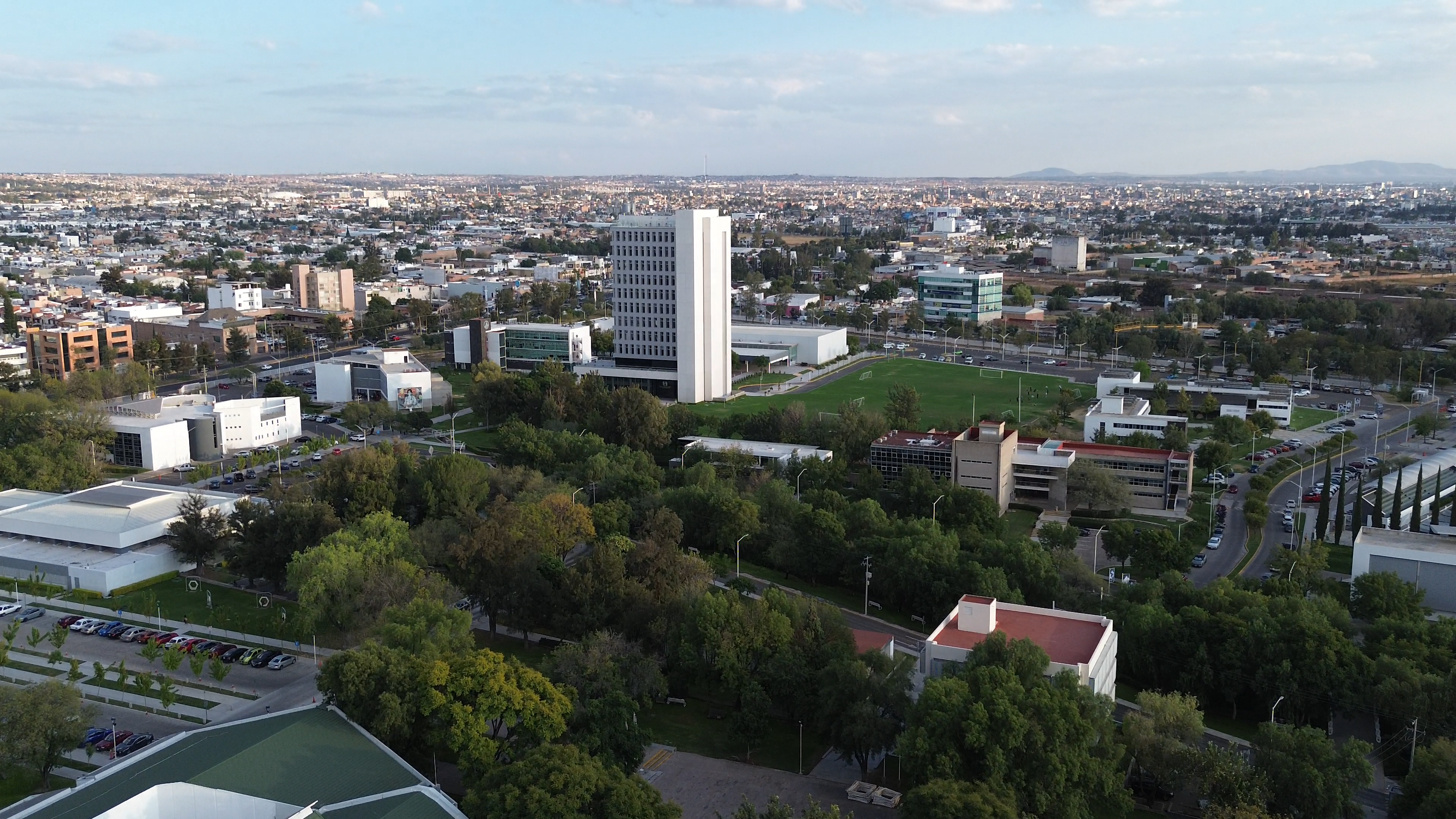
Verano de Escándalo was held in Aguascalientes, Aguascalientes, Mexico.

Lucha Libre AAA Worldwide (AAA), originally known as Asistencia Asesoría y Administración, held the first Verano de Escándalo event on September 14, 1997. Verano de Escándalo was an annual event from 1997 until 2011, usually held in September. In 2012, AAA changed their major event schedule as they pushed Triplemanía XX from the typical June or July date to August. Due to the schedule change, AAA did not hold a Verano de Escándalo event in 2012 and 2013. In 2014, Verano de Escándalo returned as an annual event typically held in June or July, filling the void left when Triplemanía was moved.

On the June 13, 2026, episode of Lucha Libre AAA, AAA announced that the 26th Verano de Escándalo event would take place on Saturday, July 25, at an unannounced venue in Aguascalientes, Aguascalientes, Mexico. The following day, Fighful reported that the event would be held at Arena San Marcos. On the July 11 episode of Lucha Libre AAA, AAA General Manager Rey Mysterio announced that Verano de Escándalo would be a three-week event, airing every Saturday on Lucha Libre AAA from July 25 to August 8.

=== Broadcast outlets ===
As part of the media rights agreement with Fox in Latin America that was announced on November 25, 2025, Verano de Escándalo aired live across Fox platforms in Latin America. The event was livestreamed on WWE and AAA's YouTube channels and Facebook pages outside of Latin America.

=== Storylines ===
The event features professional wrestling matches that involve wrestlers from scripted feuds. The wrestlers portray either heels (referred to as rudos in Mexico, those that play the part of the "bad guys") or faces (técnicos in Mexico, the "good guy" characters) as they perform.

On the June 20, 2026, episode of Lucha Libre AAA, a revived Los Perros del Mal (Daga, Berto, Angel, Bronco Nima, and Karmen Petrovic) appeared and attacked El Grande Americano. The following week, Perros del Mal assaulted El Fiscal after Abismo Negro Jr. bailed on their match. On the July 11 episode, Perros del Mal interrupted a tag team match between Money Machine (Colmillo De Plata and Garra De Oro) and the team of Epydemius Jr. and Noisy Boy to attack them. Daga called out Americano, threatening to continue their assault unless he tries to stop them. Americano then appeared with Los Americanos (Rayo Americano and Bravo Americano), but Perros del Mal's numbers advantage overpowered the trio. Then, AAA Mega Champion Dominik Mysterio came out with a steel chair and cleared Perros del Mal out of the ring. He then challenged any two members of Perros del Mal to a match against him and Americano, reuniting Los Gringos Locos 2.0.

In Week 2 of Noche de Los Grandes on June 6, La Catalina, Bayley, NXT Women's Champion Lola Vice defeated Las Tóxicas (AAA Reina de Reinas Champion Flammer, La Hiedra, and Maravilla), where Catalina pinned Flammer. On the June 13 episode of Lucha Libre AAA, Las Tóxicas attacked Vice after Hiedra and Joaquin Wilde failed to defeat Vice and Mr. Iguana for the AAA World Mixed Tag Team Championship; Catalina and Bayley came out to save Vice. Two weeks later, Vice defended the NXT Women's Championship against Hiedra, who was accompanied by her Las Tóxicas stablemates Flammer and Maravilla. Catalina came out to neutralize Flammer and Maravilla to allow Vice to retain her title. After the match, Lady Shani came out to help attack Las Tóxicas. The following week, Shani defeated the AAA Reina de Reinas Champion Flammer in a non-title match after Catalina prevented Flammer from using the title belt as a weapon. On the July 11 episode, AAA General Manager Rey Mysterio announced that Flammer was scheduled to defend the AAA Reina de Reinas Championship against Catalina and Shani in a triple threat match at Verano de Escándalo.

On the July 11 episode of Lucha Libre AAA, Mini Vikingo defeated Dragon Lee and Jack Cartwheel in a triple threat match to earn the right to challenge Rey Fénix for the AAA World Cruiserweight Championship. AAA General Manager Rey Mysterio made the match official for Verano de Escándalo.

At Alianzas on November 1, 2025, La Hiedra and Mr. Iguana lost the AAA World Mixed Tag Team Championship against Chelsea Green and Ethan Page. On the February 7, 2026, episode of Lucha Libre AAA, Page and Hiedra, who defended the title on behalf of an injured Green, lost the title to Lola Vice and Iguana, Hiedra's old tag team partner. Over the following months, Hiedra had a few failed attempts to recapture the title with different partners. On the July 18 episode of Lucha Libre AAA, La Hiedra and Laredo Kid defeated Faby Apache and Joaquin Wilde to earn the right to challenge Lola Vice and Mr. Iguana for the AAA World Mixed Tag Team Championship at Verano de Escándalo.

On the July 11 episode of Lucha Libre AAA, AAA General Manager Rey Mysterio vacated the AAA Latin American Championship after previous champion El Hijo del Vikingo suffered a knee injury. The following week, Mysterio announced a tournament, where the winners of the four triple threat qualifying matches advance to a fatal four-way match for the title at Triplemanía 34. The first qualifying match took place after the announcement with El Hijo de Dr. Wagner Jr. advancing to the four-way final after defeating Abismo Negro Jr. and Texano Jr.. At Verano de Escándalo on July 25, AAA announced that Lince Dorado would replace Dragon Lee, who was unable to compete due to a ligament tear in his thumb.

== Event ==
=== Week 1 ===
Other on-screen personnel
Role	Name
Commentators	José Manuel Guillén
Commentators	Roberto Figueroa
English commentators	Corey Graves
English commentators	John "Bradshaw" Layfield
English commentators	Rey Mysterio
Spanish–English interpreter	Adrian Mendoza
Ring announcer	Jesús Zuñiga
Referees	Adrian Butler
Referees	Suavecito

Week 1 opened with AAA General Manager Rey Mysterio speaking to the audience in the ring. He was then confronted by El Ojo (Omos and Dorian Roldán); Roldán blamed Mysterio for causing previous AAA Latin American Champion El Hijo del Vikingo's injury by making Vikingo wrestle on WWE SmackDown. He then threatened Mysterio if the title was not returned to El Ojo, but Mysterio rejected Roldán's request. El Ojo then left.

==== Preliminary match ====
The opening match was Lola Vice and Mr. Iguana versus La Hiedra and Laredo Kid in a mixed tag team match for the AAA Mixed Tag Team Championship. Iguana bested Kid early, and then Vice connected with a hip attack to Hiedra and Kid in the corner, running towards them before jumping and spinning around to thrust her pelvis backward into their faces. After recovering from a "Shattered Dreams" by Hiedra, in which Hiedra kicked a dazed Vice in the corner, and Vice tagged in the men. After an attack by Iguana, Kid countered and attempted a pinfall, but the referee's slow count caused a near-fall. Iguana then briefly recovered to tag in the women. After an attack by Vice, Kid dragged Vice off Hiedra during a pinfall attempt, prompting Iguana to brawl with Kid. Hiedra then executed the "Implant Facebuster", lifting Vice upside down before planting Vice down face-first, to win the titles via pinfall.

==== Main event ====
The main event was Los Gringos Locos 2.0 (Dominik Mysterio and El Grande Americano) versus Los Perros del Mal (Daga and Angel). Gringos Locos 2.0 worked together to execute the "Three Amigos". Daga later rebounded and tagged in Angel, who raked Americano's eyes; Americano then blindly shoved Angel into the referee, accidentally knocking the referee down. No official was available to count the pinfall attempt after Mysterio and Americano's coordinated attack to Angel. Perros del Mal members Berto and Bronco Nima then attacked Mysterio as Angel lock Americano with the "Gory Special", in which Angel placed Americano's back on his back while forcibly stretching American's back. Rayo Americano and Bravo Americano came out to attack Berto and Nima; Bravo shortly jumped off the lighting rig onto Berto and Nima. Nima then chokeslammed Rayo and Bravo through the announce table, lifting them up by their necks before slamming them down. Grande fought back against Perros del Mal's offense then attempted to tag in Mysterio, but he abandoned Grande instead. This allowed Perros del Mal to attack Grande and pin him to win the match. After the match, Omos and Dorian Roldán appeared on stage with Mysterio, signifying Mysterio joining the El Ojo stable.

=== Week 2 ===
Other on-screen personnel
Role	Name
Commentators	José Manuel Guillén
Commentators	Roberto Figueroa
English commentators	Corey Graves
English commentators	John "Bradshaw" Layfield
English commentators	Rey Mysterio
Ring announcer	Jesús Zuñiga
Referees	El Hijo del Tirantes
Referees	Gary Wilson
Referees	Suavecito

==== Preliminary matches ====
Week 2 opened with a triple threat match in the first round of the vacant AAA Latin American Championship tournament, featuring La Parka, Lince Dorado, and Mecha Wolf. Wolf blinded Dorado by spraying mist into his eyes, and then Parka and Wolf attacked Dorado take him out. Parka then hit a twisting suplex on Wolf, in which Parka lifted Wolf up over his shoulders and then turning around to twist Wolf before slamming him down, to score the pinfall victory and advance to the tournament final.

Next, El Hijo de Dr. Wagner Jr. and Galeno fought Dinámico and Drago. After Wagner Jr. and Galeno isolated Drago, Wagner Jr. attempted to pin Drago, but Dinámico broke it by saving Drago. Galeno then hit Drago with a butterfly neckbreaker, hooking both of Drago's arms before lifting Drago vertically and rotating around as he fell backwards. Galeno then made the cover to make Wagner Jr. and him victorious via pinfall.

==== Main event ====
In the main event, Rey Fénix defended the AAA World Cruiserweight Championship against Mini Vikingo. Fénix defeated Vikingo and retained his title via pinfall after executing a Mexican muscle buster, positioning Vikingo upside down on his shoulders before dropping down.

=== Week 3 ===
Other on-screen personnel
Role	Name
Commentators	José Manuel Guillén
Commentators	Roberto Figueroa
English commentators	Corey Graves
English commentators	John "Bradshaw" Layfield
English commentators	Rey Mysterio
Ring announcer	Jesús Zuñiga
Referees	El Hijo del Terantes
Referees	Gary Wilson
Referees	Suavecito

==== Preliminary matches ====
Week 3 opened with triple threat match in the first round of the AAA Latin American Championship tournament, featuring Cruz Del Toro, El Fiscal, and Psycho Clown. On the outside, Clown was attacked by an unknown tall masked man from the front row. In the ring, Fiscal executed a frog splash onto a supine Del Toro, in which Fiscal dove off the top rope while moving his arms and legs inside and outside before landing on Del Toro, to earn the pinfall victory and advance to the tournament final.

The event's penultimate match was between Noisy Boy and Jack Cartwheel. After landing a series of top-rope dives, Cartwheel executed a "Phoenix Splash", in which Cartwheel stood backwards on the turnbuckle before doing a front somersault with 1.5 rotations while performing a 180° turn in mid-air onto a supine Boy. He then pinned Boy to win the match. After the match, Los Perros del Mal attacked Cartwheel. They then revealed that Damián 666 had officially rejoined the stable.

==== Main event ====
In the main event, Flammer defended the AAA Reina de Reinas Championship in a triple threat match against La Catalina and Lady Shani. Catalina executed a frog splash onto Shani; she then attempted a pinfall but Flammer was able to stop it. On the outside, Catalina hit Flammer with a spear, charging at Flammer to drive her shoulder into Flammer's midsection. Back in the ring, Catalina later hit a "Shining Wizard" on Shani, striking Shani's head with her knee. However, she could not attempt a pinfall because Flammer threw her to the outside before pinning Shani to win the match and retain the title.

== Results ==
Week 1 (July 25)
No.	Results	Stipulations	Times
1	La Hiedra and Laredo Kid defeated Lola Vice and Mr. Iguana (c)	Mixed tag team match for the AAA World Mixed Tag Team Championship; Had Hiedra and Kid lost, Hiedra would have no longer been able to challenge for the title.	9:31
2	Los Perros del Mal (Daga and Angel) defeated Los Gringos Locos 2.0 (Dominik Mysterio and El Grande Americano)	Tag team match	20:34
(c) / – the champion(s) heading into the match

Week 2 (August 1)
No.	Results	Stipulations	Times
1	La Parka defeated Lince Dorado and Mecha Wolf by pinfall	Triple threat match The winner advanced to the four-way tournament final for the vacant AAA Latin American Championship at Triplemanía 34.	12:04
2	El Hijo de Dr. Wagner Jr. and Galeno defeated Drago and Dinámico by pinfall	Tag team match	2:44
3	Rey Fénix (c) defeated Mini Vikingo by pinfall	Singles match for the AAA World Cruiserweight Championship	10:54
(c) / – the champion(s) heading into the match

Week 3 (August 8)
No.	Results	Stipulations	Times
1	El Fiscal defeated Cruz Del Toro and Psycho Clown by pinfall	Triple threat match The winner advanced to the four-way tournament final for the vacant AAA Latin American Championship at Triplemanía 34.	7:46
2	Jack Cartwheel defeated Noisy Boy by pinfall	Singles match	4:30
3	Flammer (c) defeated La Catalina and Lady Shani by pinfall	Triple threat match for the AAA Reina de Reinas Championship	9:09
(c) / – the champion(s) heading into the match

=== AAA Latin American Championship Tournament ===
First round Lucha Libre AAA; July 11, 2026 (Aired: July 18); Verano de Escándalo; July 25, 2026 (Aired: August 1–8)
La Parka	Pinfall
Mecha Wolf	12:04
Lince Dorado (Note: Lince Dorado replaced Dragon Lee, who was unable to compete due to a ligament tear in his thumb.)	—
El Fiscal	Pinfall
Cruz Del Toro	7:46
Psycho Clown	—
El Hijo de Dr. Wagner Jr.	Pinfall
Abismo Negro Jr.	8:35
Texano Jr.	—
Omos	—
Damian Priest	Bye (Note: Damian Priest received a first round bye after Omos was suspended from AAA and Galeno was not medically cleared to compete following Omos' attack on Galeno.)
Galeno	—

Final; Ola de Calor; August 30, 2026
La Parka	Pinfall
El Fiscal	9:22
El Hijo de Dr. Wagner Jr.	—
Damian Priest	—
