= List of current champions in Lucha Libre AAA Worldwide =

Lucha Libre AAA Worldwide (AAA) is a professional wrestling promotion based in Mexico City. Title reigns are either determined by professional wrestling matches or are awarded to a wrestler, as a result of the culmination of various scripted storylines.

== Overview ==
Currently in AAA, there are seven total active championships - three men's singles championships, a traditional men's tag team championship, a mixed tag team championship, a men's trios championship, and a championship for female wrestlers.

11 wrestlers officially hold the championships. The list includes the number of times the wrestler has held the title, the date and location of the win, and a description of the winning bout. The following is correct as of November 17, 2026.

=== Men's singles ===
At the top of AAA's championship hierarchy is the AAA Mega Championship. The title is currently held by first-time champion El Grande Americano. He won the title by defeating Dominik Mysterio in a No Disqualification match at Night 2 of Triplemanía 34 on September 13, 2026, in Azcapotzalco, Mexico City, Mexico.

The secondary title is the AAA Latin American Championship. The title is currently held by first-time champion La Parka. He won the vacant title by defeating Damian Priest, El Fiscal, and El Hijo de Dr. Wagner Jr. in the fatal four-way tournament final at Ola de Calor on August 30, 2026, in Edinburg, Texas, United States. The title was previously vacated when previous champion El Hijo del Vikingo suffered a knee injury.

The AAA World Cruiserweight Championship is for male wrestlers 231 lbs. and under. The title is currently held by two-time champion Rey Fénix. He won the title by defeating Laredo Kid at Noche de Los Grandes on May 30, 2026 in Monterrey, Nuevo León, Mexico.

=== Tag team ===
The AAA World Tag Team Championship is the primary tag team title in AAA. The Wagner Brothers (El Hijo de Dr. Wagner Jr. and Galeno) are the current champions in their first reign as a team and individually. They won the titles by defeating The War Raiders (Erik and Ivar) at Night 2 of Triplemanía 34 on September 13, 2026, in Azcapotzalco, Mexico City, Mexico. This was an open challenge.

The AAA World Trios Championship is for three-man teams. Los Perros del Mal (Daga, Angel, and Berto) are the current champions in their first reign as a team and individually. They won the titles by defeating Los Psycho Circus (Dave the Clown, Murder Clown, Panic Clown, and Psycho Clown) at Night 1 of Triplemanía 34 on September 11, 2026, in Paradise, Nevada, United States; Dave, Murder, and Psycho defended the titles.

The AAA World Mixed Tag Team Championship is for teams consisting of one male and one female wrestler. The current champions are Big Mami and Niño Hamburguesa, who are in their second reign as a team and invidually. They won the titles by defeating La Hiedra and Laredo Kid on the November 14, 2026, taping of Lucha Libre AAA in Mexico City, Mexico.

=== Women ===
There is one championship contested for female wrestlers (promoted as their Reinas del Ring division), known as the AAA Reina de Reinas Champion. La Catalina is the current champion in her first reign. She won the title by defeating Flammer at Night 2 of Triplemanía 34 on September 13, 2026, in Azcapotzalco, Mexico City, Mexico.

== Current champions ==
=== Singles ===
Championship	Current champion(s)	Reign	Date won	Days held	Location	Notes	Ref.
AAA Mega Championship	El Grande Americano	1	September 13, 2026	65+	Azcapotzalco, Mexico City, Mexico	Defeated Dominik Mysterio in a No Disqualification match at Night 2 of Triplemanía 34.	
AAA Reina de Reinas Championship	La Catalina	1	September 13, 2026	65	Azcapotzalco, Mexico City, Mexico	Defeated Flammer at Night 2 of Triplemanía 34.	
AAA Latin American Championship	La Parka	1	August 30, 2026	79	Edinburg, Texas, U.S.	Defeated Damian Priest, El Fiscal, and El Hijo de Dr. Wagner Jr. in the fatal four-way tournament final to win the vacant title at Ola de Calor.	
AAA World Cruiserweight Championship	Rey Fénix	2	May 30, 2026	171	Monterrey, Nuevo León, Mexico	Defeated Laredo Kid at Noche de Los Grandes.	

=== Team ===
Championship	Current champion(s)	Reign	Date won	Days held	Location	Notes	Ref.
AAA World Tag Team Championship	The Wagner Brothers (El Hijo de Dr. Wagner Jr. and Galeno)	1	September 13, 2026	65+	Azcapotzalco, Mexico City, Mexico	Defeated The War Raiders (Erik and Ivar) at Night 2 of Triplemanía 34. This was an open challenge.	
AAA World Mixed Tag Team Championship	Big Mami and Niño Hamburguesa	2	November 14, 2026	3	Mexico City, Mexico	Defeated La Hiedra and Laredo Kid at a taping of Lucha Libre AAA.	
AAA World Trios Championship	Los Perros del Mal (Daga, Angel, and Berto (not pictured)	1	September 11, 2026	67	Paradise, Nevada, U.S.	Defeated Los Psycho Circus (Dave the Clown, Murder Clown, Panic Clown, and Psycho Clown) at Night 1 of Triplemanía 34; Dave, Murder, and Psycho defended the titles.	

== See also ==
- List of Lucha Libre AAA Worldwide personnel
- List of current champions in WWE
