= Ola de Calor =

2026 AAA professional wrestling event

- Promotional poster featuring Rey Fénix, Rey Mysterio, Penta, Dominik Mysterio, El Grande Americano, and La Catalina
- Promotion(s): Lucha Libre AAA Worldwide; WWE (Note: WWE handled the production of this event.)
- Date: August 30, 2026
- City: Edinburg, Texas, U.S.
- Venue: Bert Ogden Arena
- Attendance: 5,581

Pay-per-view chronology
← Previous; Verano de Escándalo	Next → Triplemanía 34

Heatwave chronology
← Previous; 2025	Next → 2026

Ola de Calor (Spanish for "Heat Wave"), also promoted as Ola de Calor: Edinburg, was a 2026 professional wrestling livestreaming event produced by the Mexican promotion Lucha Libre AAA Worldwide (AAA). It was held in partnership with AAA's parent company WWE as a localized version of WWE's Heatwave event for the Mexican market, which made it the 12th Heatwave overall. The event took place on Sunday, August 30, 2026, at the Bert Ogden Arena in Edinburg, Texas, United States, and featured wrestlers from AAA and WWE's Raw, SmackDown, and NXT brands. The event took place right before NXT's Heatwave in the same venue with both events going head-to-head against All Elite Wrestling's pay-per-view event, All In.

Seven matches were contested at the event. In the main event, Dragon Lee and The Lucha Brothers (Penta and Rey Fénix) defeated Los Perros del Mal (Daga, Angel, and Berto). In other prominent matches, Jack Cartwheel vs. Mini Vikingo vs. Nathan Frazer in a triple threat match for a AAA World Cruiserweight Championship match at Triplemanía 34 ended in a time limit draw, La Parka defeated Damian Priest, El Fiscal, and El Hijo de Dr. Wagner Jr. in a fatal four-way match to win the vacant AAA Latin American Championship, and The War Raiders (Erik and Ivar) defeated Los Americanos (Rayo Americano and Bravo Americano) to retain the AAA World Tag Team Championship. The event also featured the AAA in-ring debut of El Carnicero.

== Production ==
=== Background ===
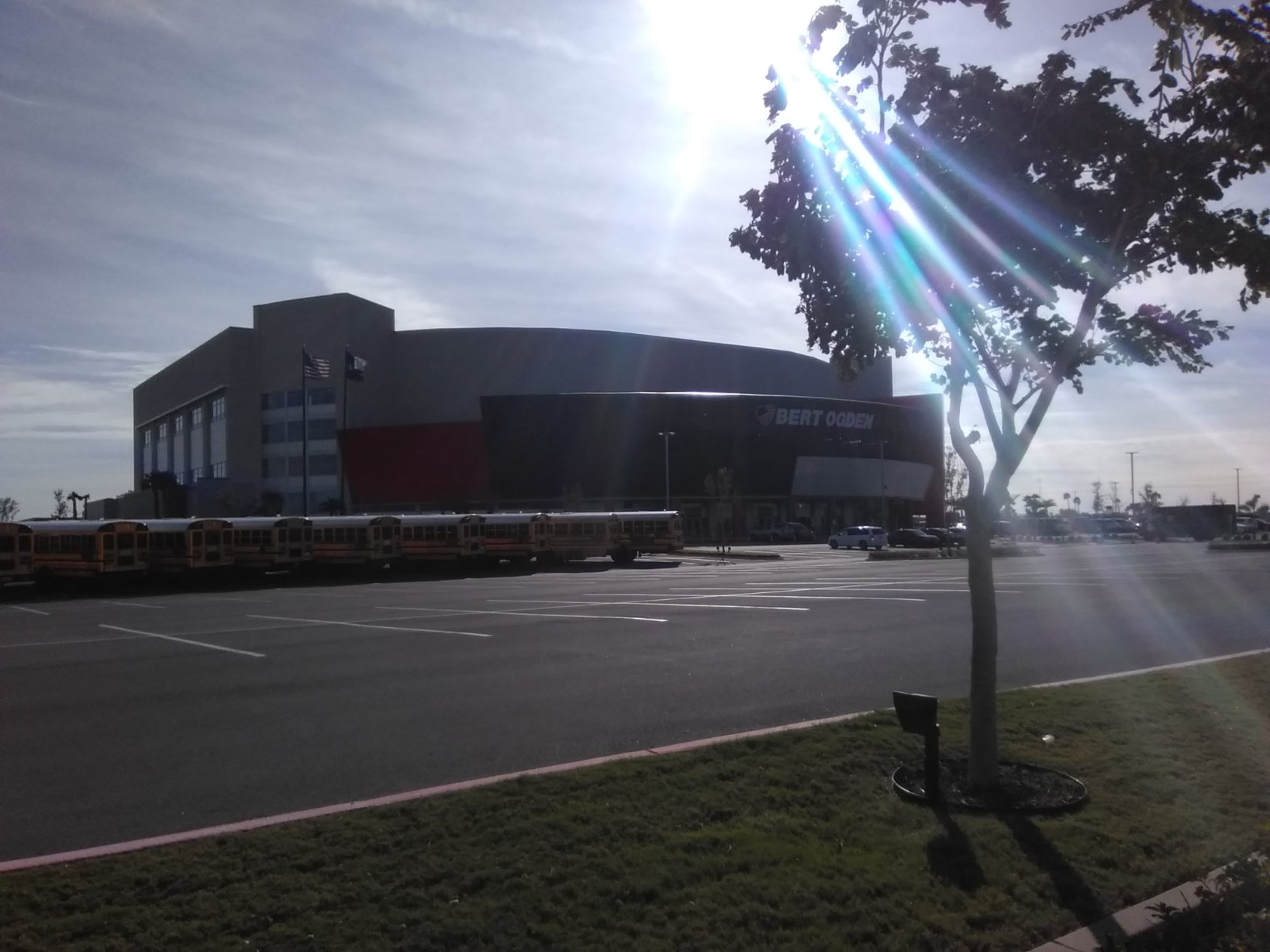
Ola de Calor, which was the 12th overall Heatwave event, took place at Bert Ogden Arena in Edinburg, Texas, United States.

Heatwave is a professional wrestling event established in 1994, held during the summer. After Extreme Championship Wrestling folded in 2001, the American promotion WWE acquired its assets in 2003. After 19 years since that acquisition, WWE reinstated Heatwave as its own event for its developmental brand, NXT, in 2022, becoming an annual event for the brand. After the first two events were held as television specials of the NXT program, it became a premium live event (PLE) in 2024. The following year, WWE acquired the Mexican promotion, Lucha Libre AAA Worldwide (AAA).

At NXT The Great American Bash on June 27, 2026, a AAA event was announced to be held right before NXT Heatwave on Sunday, August 30, at Bert Ogden Arena in Edinburg, Texas, United States. On August 7, AAA unveiled the name of the event as Ola de Calor (Spanish for "Heat Wave"), a localized version of WWE's Heatwave event, making Ola de Calor the 12th overall Heatwave, with the event also promoted as Ola de Calor: Edinburg. Both Ola de Calor and NXT's Heatwave went head-to-head against All Elite Wrestling's pay-per-view event, All In.

=== Broadcast outlets ===
In the United States, the event was broadcast as a livestreaming event on YouTube and Facebook. As part of a media rights agreement with the Fox Corporation, the event aired as a television special on Fox and their streaming affiliates Fox One and Tubi in Mexico and Latin America.

=== Storylines ===
The event featured professional wrestling matches that involve wrestlers from scripted feuds. The wrestlers portrayed either heels (referred to as rudos in Mexico, those that play the part of the "bad guys") or faces (técnicos in Mexico, the "good guy" characters) as they perform. Results were predetermined by WWE's writers from their AAA subsidiary, while storylines were produced on WWE's weekly television program, Lucha Libre AAA.

On the August 22, 2026, episode of Lucha Libre AAA, AAA General Manager Rey Mysterio announced a gauntlet match at Ola de Calor for a shot at Flammer's AAA Reina de Reinas Championship at Triplemanía 34.

On the August 22 episode of Lucha Libre AAA, Los Americanos (Rayo Americano and Bravo Americano) defeated Latino World Order (Cruz Del Toro and Joaquin Wilde), Los Psycho Circus (Dave the Clown and Murder Clown), and Money Machine (Colmillo de Plata and Garra de Oro) in a fatal four-way tag team match to earn the right to face The War Raiders (Erik and Ivar) for the AAA World Tag Team Championship at Ola de Calor.

On the August 8 episode of Lucha Libre AAA, Psycho Clown competed in a triple threat first round tournament match for the vacant AAA Latin American Championship, but an unknown luchador appeared behind the barricade and attacked Clown, costing him the match. Two weeks later, AAA revealed the name of the unknown luchador, El Carnicero, and announced his in-ring debut at Ola de Calor.

On the July 11 episode of Lucha Libre AAA, AAA General Manager Rey Mysterio vacated the AAA Latin American Championship after previous champion El Hijo del Vikingo suffered a knee injury. The following week, Mysterio announced a tournament, where the winners of the four triple threat qualifiers advance to a fatal four-way match for the title at Triplemanía 34. The first qualifying match took place after the announcement with El Hijo de Dr. Wagner Jr. advancing to the four-way final after defeating Abismo Negro Jr., and Texano Jr.. At Verano de Escándalo on July 25, AAA announced that Lince Dorado would replace Dragon Lee, who was unable to compete due to a ligament tear in his thumb. In the following weeks, La Parka defeated Dorado and Mecha Wolf and El Fiscal defeated Cruz Del Toro and Psycho Clown to advance to the tournament final. On the August 22 episode of Lucha Libre AAA, Omos battled Galeno, which ended in a no contest after Omos repeatedly hit Galeno with the steel steps. Omos then slammed Galeno down the announce table twice. When Omos tried to throw the steel steps from the ring to Galeno on the outside, Mysterio stopped him. Omos then lifted Mysterio up by his neck, prompting Omos' manager Dorian Roldán and his El Ojo stablemate and AAA Mega Champion Dominik Mysterio to convince Omos to not continue his attack on Rey. Omos put Rey down and hit him in the chest instead. Rey then banned Omos from AAA. Later that night, Rey announced that Galeno was not medically cleared to compete after the attack. Due to the events involving Omos and Galeno, Damian Priest's opponents in the first round of the tournament, Rey awarded Priest a first round bye to advance to the tournament final and revealed that the tournament final would be moved to Ola de Calor.

On the August 15 episode, Los Perros del Mal (Daga, Angel, Berto, Bronco Nima, and Karmen Petrovic) tried to convince former Perros del Mal member Penta to rejoin the stable. If Penta accepted, Daga promised that Perros del Mal would help Penta in his potential World Heavyweight Championship match against Roman Reigns. Later that night, Penta said that he did not want dead weight in Perros del Mal, and Nima thought Penta was referring to him. Nima then challenged Penta to a match where if Penta lost, he would be forced to rejoin the stable. The following week, Nima failed to defeat Penta, which prompted Nima's stablemates to attack Nima, kicking him out of the group. Daga then asked Penta to rejoin the stable again, but Penta refused. Perros del Mal retaliated until Penta's brother and AAA World Cruiserweight Champion Rey Fénix and Dragon Lee to come out and help Penta. After they fended off Perros del Mal, Penta challenged Daga, Angel, and Berto to a match against him, Fénix, and Lee at Ola de Calor.

On August 26, AAA General Manager Rey Mysterio announced a triple threat match at Ola de Calor featuring Jack Cartwheel, Mini Vikingo, and Nathan Frazer for the right to challenge Rey Fénix for the AAA World Cruiserweight Championship match at Night 2 of Triplemanía 34.

== Event ==
Other on-screen personnel
Role	Name
Commentators	José Manuel Guillén
Commentators	Roberto Figueroa
English commentators	Corey Graves
English commentators	John "Bradshaw" Layfield
English commentators	Rey Mysterio
Spanish–English interpreter	Andrea Bazarte
Ring announcer	Jesús Zuñiga
Referees	Jason Ayers
Referees	Adrian Butler
Referees	Felix Fernandez
Referees	Jeremy Marcus
Referees	Derek Sanders
Referees	Gary Wilson

=== Preliminary matches ===
The opening match was an eight-man tag team match between the team of Latino World Order (Cruz Del Toro and Joaquin Wilde), Lince Dorado, and Mini Abismo Negro and the team of Axiom, Mr. Iguana, Noisy Boy, and Mascarita Sagrada. Sagrada tackled Dorado with his shoulder, and then Sagrada countered Negro's attack. Axiom then dove onto Wilde before Boy dove onto a pile of competitors. Sagrada later took out Negro with a dive to the outside. After dodging an aerial attack from Del Toro, Iguana hit Del Toro with La Yesca, Iguana's plushie, before executing a bulldog, in which Iguana grabbed Del Toro's head and jumped forward to force Del Toro down face-first. Iguana then pinned Del Toro to get the victory.

The second match was a gauntlet match for the right to face Flammer for the AAA Reina de Reinas Championship at Triplemanía 34. This match consisted of a series of one-fall matches, where two wrestlers began the match and the loser of that fall would be replaced by another wrestler until all competitors have entered the match; the last remaining competitor would be crowned the winner. Adelicious versus Lady Shani fought in the first fall. Shani eliminated Adelicious via pinfall after Shani executed a body scissors roll on Adelicious, wrapping her leg around Adelicious before rolling her down to her shoulders. Thea Hail was the next competitor, and she eliminated Shani via pinfall with a roll-up, rolling backwards to position on top of Shani's legs with Shani's shoulders on the mat. La Catalina then entered the match and eliminated Hail via pinfall with a jackknife pin, in which Catalina grabbed Hail's legs, flipped over Hail, and bridged her back for leverage. La Hiedra, Flammer's Las Tóxicas teammate, was the last competitor. Hiedra attempted to strike Catalina with the title belt, but the referee prevented her. While the referee was distracted in the corner, Hiedra held Catalina so Flammer could hit Catalina with the title belt, but Catalina evaded and Hiedra got hit instead. Catalina then pinned Hiedra to win the match and earn the title shot.

Next, The War Raiders (Erik and Ivar) defended the AAA World Tag Team Championship against Los Americanos (Rayo Americano and Bravo Americano). After Erik dragged Rayo to the outside, Bravo went for a headbutt off the top rope onto Ivar, but Ivar positioned the title belt in the way and thus, Bravo's head landed on the title belt, knocking Bravo out. Ivar then pinned Bravo to retain their titles.

El Carnicero's in-ring debut against Chris Carter followed. Carnicero slammed Carter from the ring to the outside. Carnicero then tossed Carter into the ringpost. As Carnicero was choking Carter, the referee tried to make him stop but was forced to stop the match instead. Following the match, Carnicero continued to attack Carter. Los Psycho Circus (Murder Clown and Dave the Clown) came out to stop Carnicero, who then fought back against Psycho Circus. Psycho Clown then ran out and repeatedly struck Carnicero with a kendo stick. Psycho then tossed Carnicero to the outside before challenging Carnicero to a Mexican Street Fight at Triplemanía 34.

The fifth match was a triple threat match between Mini Vikingo, Jack Cartwheel, and Nathan Frazer for the right to face Rey Fénix for the AAA World Cruiserweight Championship at Triplemanía 34. Cartwheel countered a dive from Vikingo by kicking Vikingo's face mid-air. Cartwheel dove onto Vikingo and attempted a pinfall, but it was voided by Frazer. Cartwheel avoided a dive from Frazer, and Vikingo landed a 630° senton on Frazer, in which Vikingo performed a double front somersault off the top rope onto a supine Frazer. Vikingo attempted to pin Frazer, but Cartwheel broke it up. The bell rang as the match had reached its 20-minute time limit, ending the match in a draw. Following the match, Fénix came out and announced that he would defend the title against all three competitors in a fatal four-way match at Triplemanía 34.

The penultimate match was the fatal four-way tournament final for the vacant AAA Latin American Championship featuring Damian Priest, El Fiscal, El Hijo de Dr. Wagner Jr., and La Parka. Early into the match, Fiscal, Wagner Jr., and Parka simultaneously attacked Priest to neutralize him early, but a recovered Priest would later take out all three of his opponents. After Priest took out Wagner Jr., Priest executed the "South of Heaven" on Fiscal, lifting Fiscal up by his neck before slamming Fiscal down. As Priest attempted to pin Fiscal, Parka dove onto Priest to break the pinfall attempt. Parka then executed the "Bonebreaker" on Fiscal, in which Parka placed Fiscal on his shoulders, positioned him upside down, and spun around before slamming Fiscal down back-first. Parka then pinned Fiscal to win the match, the tournament, and the title.

Prior to the main event, a contract signing occurred to make the AAA Mega Championship match between Dominik Mysterio and El Grande Americano at Triplemanía 34 official; AAA General Manager Rey Mysterio mediated the contract signing. Dorian Roldán, who accompanied Dominik, vied for the lifting of Omos's suspension from AAA, but Rey refused. Americano told Dominik that he would have the chance at Triplemanía 34 in Mexico City to prove that he is worthy of having the self-proclaimed moniker of being the "King of the Luchadores". Americano then signed the contract. Dominik threatened to not sign the contract if Omos' suspension was not lifted. Rey refused and threatened to strip the title off of Dominik if Dominik do not sign. Americano then insisted to Rey that he does not want to win the title in that fashion, but Rey still refused. Omos appeared in the crowd; Rey asked for security to kick Omos out, but Omos showed his ticket as a paying audience member. Rey then attacked Omos with a microphone, prompting Americano to pull Rey away. Then, Dominik attacked Rey at ringside and attacked Americano with a steel chair. Rey then announced a match between Omos and himself at Triplemanía 34, where Omos would be granted a return to AAA if he wins, but if Omos loses, he would be banned from AAA. Dominik then signed the contract to make his match against Americano official.

=== Main event ===
In the main event, Los Perros del Mal (Daga, Angel, and Berto) (with Karmen Petrovic) faced the team of Dragon Lee and The Lucha Brothers (Penta and Rey Fénix). As the referee was distracted, Petrovic inflicted an attack. As Lee was pinning Angel, Petrovic placed Angel's leg to force a break in the pinfall attempt. Fénix and Lee later dove onto Angel and Daga. Fénix subsequently blocked a dive from Berto before executing the "Mexican Muscle Buster", in which Fénix positioned Berto upside down with Berto's head on his shoulder and then spun around before slamming Berto down back-first. Fénix then pinned Berto to get the victory.

== Reception ==
Dave Meltzer of the Wrestling Observer Newsletter gave the opening eight-man tag team match 4 stars, the AAA World Tag Team Championship match 3.5 stars, the triple threat match 4.75 stars, the AAA Latin American Championship fatal four-way match 3.5 stars, and the main event 3.75 stars.

== Results ==
No.	Results	Stipulations	Times
1	Axiom, Mr. Iguana, Noisy Boy, and Mascarita Sagrada defeated Latino World Order (Cruz Del Toro and Joaquin Wilde), Lince Dorado, and Mini Abismo Negro by pinfall	Eight-man tag team match	9:47
2	La Catalina defeated Adelicious, Lady Shani, Thea Hail, and La Hiedra	Gauntlet match for a AAA Reina de Reinas Championship match at Triplemanía 34	17:33
3	The War Raiders (Erik and Ivar) (c) defeated Los Americanos (Rayo Americano and Bravo Americano) by pinfall	Tag team match for the AAA World Tag Team Championship	10:19
4	El Carnicero vs. Chris Carter ended in a no contest	Singles match	2:24
5	Jack Cartwheel vs. Mini Vikingo vs. Nathan Frazer ended in a time limit draw	Triple threat match for a AAA World Cruiserweight Championship match at Triplemanía 34	20:00
6	La Parka defeated Damian Priest, El Fiscal, and El Hijo de Dr. Wagner Jr. by pinfall	Fatal four-way match for the vacant AAA Latin American Championship	9:22
7	Dragon Lee and The Lucha Brothers (Penta and Rey Fénix) defeated Los Perros del Mal (Daga, Angel, and Berto) (with Karmen Petrovic) by pinfall	Trios match	11:51
(c) / – the champion(s) heading into the match

=== AAA Reina de Reinas Championship #1 Contender's Gauntlet match ===
Elimination table
Fall	Wrestler	Eliminated by	Method	Time
1	Adelicious	Lady Shani	Pinfall	3:00
2	Lady Shani	Thea Hail	Pinfall	7:10
3	Thea Hail	La Catalina	Pinfall	11:40
4	La Hiedra	La Catalina	Pinfall	17:33
—	La Catalina	Winner	—	17:33

=== AAA Latin American Championship Tournament ===
First round Lucha Libre AAA; July 11, 2026 (Aired: July 18); Verano de Escándalo; July 25, 2026 (Aired: August 1–8)
La Parka	Pinfall
Mecha Wolf	12:04
Lince Dorado (Note: Lince Dorado replaced Dragon Lee, who was unable to compete due to a ligament tear in his thumb.)	—
El Fiscal	Pinfall
Cruz Del Toro	7:46
Psycho Clown	—
El Hijo de Dr. Wagner Jr.	Pinfall
Abismo Negro Jr.	8:35
Texano Jr.	—
Omos	—
Damian Priest	Bye (Note: Damian Priest received a first round bye after Omos was suspended from AAA and Galeno was not medically cleared to compete following Omos' attack on Galeno.)
Galeno	—

Final; Ola de Calor; August 30, 2026
La Parka	Pinfall
El Fiscal	9:22
El Hijo de Dr. Wagner Jr.	—
Damian Priest	—
