= Omos =

Nigerian professional wrestler (born 1992)

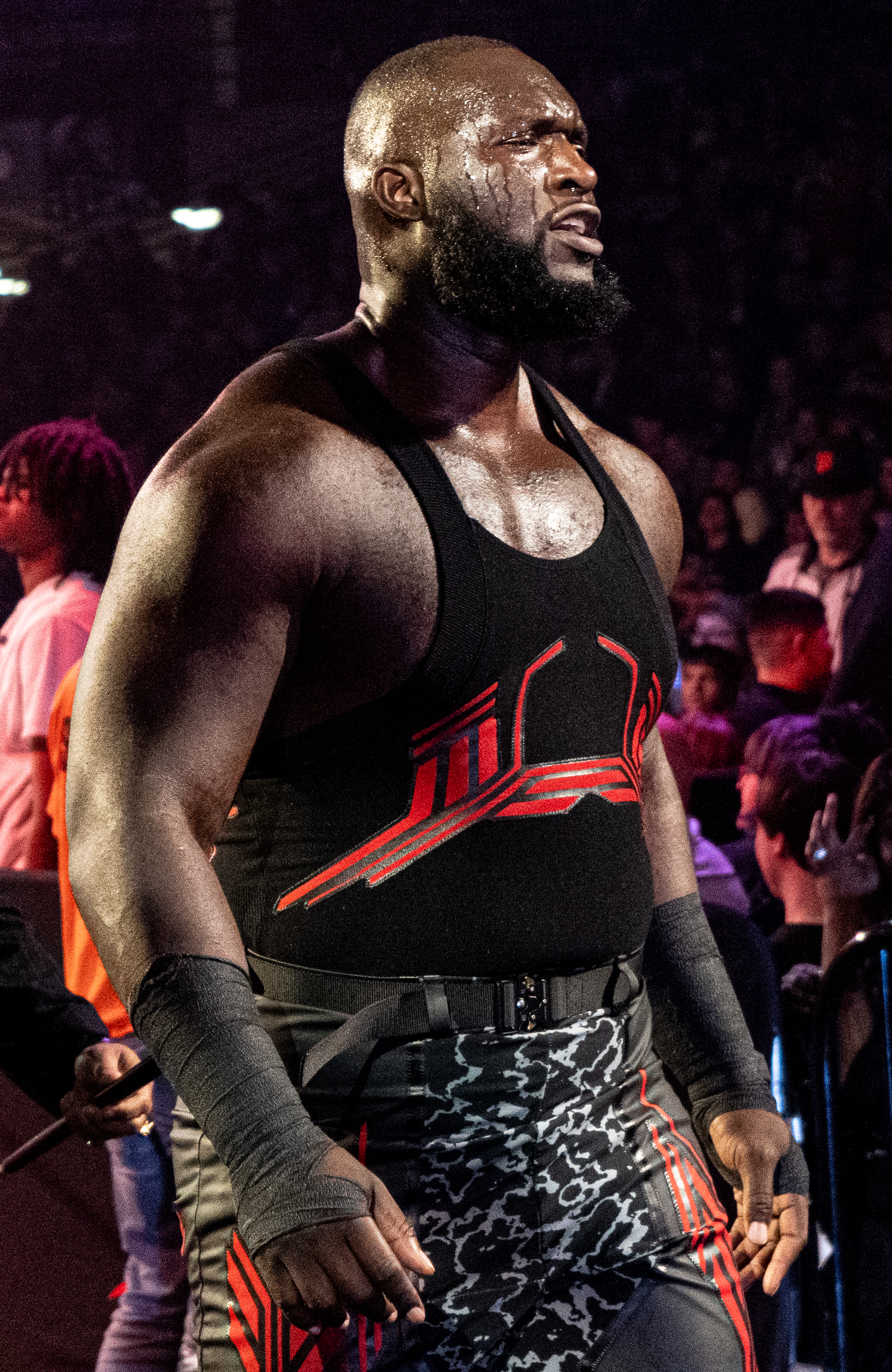
- Omos in 2024

Personal information
- Born: Tolulope Omogbehin; May 16, 1992 (age 34) Lagos, Nigeria
- Spouse: Cheyenne Quailey (m. 2023)

Professional wrestling career
- Ring name(s): Jordan Omogbehin; The Nigerian Giant; Omos
- Billed height: 7 ft 3 in (221 cm)
- Billed weight: 416 lb (189 kg)
- Trained by: WWE Performance Center
- Debut: July 18, 2019

Tolulope "Jordan" Omogbehin (born May 16, 1992) is a Nigerian professional wrestler and former college basketball player. He is signed to WWE, where he performs in its sister promotion Lucha Libre AAA Worldwide under the ring name Omos (/ɒˈmɑːs/ o-MAHS) as part of the El Ojo stable.

In the course of his career as a college basketball player, he played for the University of South Florida and Morgan State University from 2014 to 2015 and played as a forward for King University men's basketball team from 2015 to 2016. Omogbehin signed with WWE in January 2019, and in October 2020, went on to become the personal bodyguard of AJ Styles, with whom he would win the Raw Tag Team Championship at WrestleMania 37. He would then be affiliated with MVP, who served as his manager, from 2022 until the latter's departure in 2024.

== Early life ==
Omogbehin was born on May 16, 1992, in Lagos but his father is from Edo State, Nigeria. He was sent to the United States on a scholarship alone when he was fifteen with his family staying in Nigeria, though he has an older brother that lives in Indiana. Omogbehin attended and graduated from Atlantic Shores Christian School in Chesapeake, Virginia, and through high school, he played basketball and continued in the sport after choosing to attend the University of South Florida (USF) where he played at the center position. Omogbehin met basketball legend Hakeem Olajuwon during the USF Bulls' team trip to Houston, Texas, in 2014. Omogbehin also played basketball at Morgan State University in Baltimore, Maryland after transferring from USF; he played center for the Morgan State Bears from 2014 to 2015. He also played as a forward for King University men's basketball team in NCAA Division II from 2015 to 2016.

== Professional wrestling career ==
=== WWE (2019–present) ===
==== Training and debut (2019–2020) ====
It was reported on January 1, 2019, that WWE signed Omogbehin with six other athletes to train at the WWE Performance Center. On July 18, 2019, Omogbehin made his in-ring debut during a July 18 house show, defeating team 2.0 in a two-on-one handicap match. He would keep wrestling on house shows during the following months. On June 15, 2020, he made his television debut during the episode of Monday Night Raw, where he was presented as a surprise member of Akira Tozawa's ninja faction. Appearing as the tallest member of the faction, Omogbehin was referred to only as the "Giant Ninja" as he stood at ringside during team Tozawa's tag match against the Street Profits and The Viking Raiders, however, he would be repackaged as a bodyguard shortly thereafter, serving as the doorman and bouncer for Shane McMahon's Raw Underground.

==== Teaming with AJ Styles (2020–2021) ====
In October 2020, after the cancellation of Raw Underground, Omogbehin began associating with AJ Styles, thus establishing himself as a heel. At Survivor Series, Omogbehin was introduced with a new ring name, Omos. At TLC: Tables, Ladders and Chairs, Omos was involved in the WWE Championship match with the eponymous stipulation, preventing The Miz from reaching the title and dropping him onto a table placed outside the ring before chasing John Morrison to the back. At Royal Rumble, during the 2021 Royal Rumble match, Omos involved himself by preventing AJ Styles from being eliminated on a few occasions. Omos eliminated Big E and Rey Mysterio despite not being in the match. He would also go on to help Styles enter the Elimination Chamber match early before being ejected by WWE official Adam Pearce.

On the March 15, 2021, episode of Raw, Omos announced that he would be making his televised in-ring debut at WrestleMania 37 alongside Styles against The New Day (Kofi Kingston and Xavier Woods) for the WWE Raw Tag Team Championship. At the event, Omos and Styles defeated The New Day to win the titles, after Omos hit Kingston with a choke bomb and pinned him. At SummerSlam, Omos and Styles lost the Raw Tag Team Championship to RK-Bro (Randy Orton and Riddle). At Extreme Rules, Omos and Styles teamed with Bobby Lashley to take on The New Day in a 6-man tag team match, in which Styles, Omos and Lashley lost. After this, it was announced that Styles and Omos would face RK-Bro in a rematch for the tag team titles at Crown Jewel. At the event, they failed to regain the titles.

At Survivor Series on November 21, 2021, Omos participated in a 25-men dual-branded battle royal in honor of the 25th anniversary of The Rock's debut at the 1996 Survivor Series. Omos had the most eliminations at 12 and won the match by last eliminating Ricochet. After weeks of tension between him and Styles, on the December 20, 2021, episode of Raw, Omos refused to tag into their match against Rey Mysterio and Dominik Mysterio, ultimately costing them the match. A fight broke out between the two, effectively ending their alliance when Omos turned on a now face AJ Styles.

==== Alliance with MVP (2022–2024) ====
On the January 3, 2022, episode of Raw, a week after splitting up from Styles, a match was set up between the two on Raw, where Omos defeated Styles. On January 29, at the Royal Rumble, Omos entered the namesake match for the first time in his career at number 11, where he eliminated Montez Ford, Angelo Dawkins, and Damian Priest before he was eliminated by Styles, Austin Theory, Chad Gable, Dominik Mysterio, Ricochet, and Ridge Holland. On Night 2 of WrestleMania 38, he faced Bobby Lashley in a losing effort, marking his first pinfall loss in WWE. On the April 4 episode of Raw, Omos would begin feuding with Lashley and acquired a new manager in MVP, who had turned on Lashley, thus forming an alliance between the two. He defeated Lashley at WrestleMania Backlash with MVP's help, but lost to him in a steel cage match on the May 16 episode of Raw. At Hell in a Cell, Omos and MVP lost to Lashley in a 2-on-1 handicap match, ending their feud.

On the June 20 episode of Raw, Omos would qualify for the Men's Money in the Bank ladder match after defeating Riddle. At the event, he would fail at winning the match after being thrown through the announce table by all the other competitors.

At Crown Jewel on November 5, Omos lost to Braun Strowman, and was eliminated by him at the Royal Rumble match. He also was defeated by Brock Lesnar at WrestleMania 39. He would then lose to Seth Rollins at Backlash. Omos would return as the final entry in the Slim Jim SummerSlam Battle Royal but failed to win. In the 2024 Royal Rumble, Omos entered at number #21, eliminating Bronson Reed before being eliminated by Bron Breakker. He participated in the 2024 André the Giant Memorial Battle Royal, eliminating Kit Wilson before accidentally eliminating himself. On August 16, MVP left WWE when his contract expired, ending the 2-year alliance between the two.

==== Partner promotions (2024–present) ====
While under contract with WWE, Omos was sent to work with promotions allied with WWE. The first one was the Japanese Pro Wrestling Noah, where he became a member of the Team 2000X stable. Introduced by Yoshitatsu and Daga, he had been brought in to compete with Jack Morris against the incumbent GHC Tag Team Champions Naomichi Marufuji and Takashi Sugiura in a title match at that the Noah The New Year pay-per-view event. At the event, they defeated the champions. On January 25, 2025, Omos announced that he would be leaving Noah to return to WWE and handed his GHC Tag Team Championship to Daga. However, the title was vacated on January 27 with Daga not being recognized as champion.

Omos would make his Lucha Libre AAA Worldwide debut, which WWE acquired in 2025, at Triplemanía XXXIII where he won the 2025 Bardahl Cup. At Guerra de Titanes, Omos would attack Dragon Lee during his match against El Hijo del Vikingo, helping Vikingo win. AAA director general Dorian Roldán then revealed Omos and Vikingo as the new members of the "El Ojo" stable. Omos returned during AAA's premiere on Fox on January 17, 2026, helping Vikingo win the #1 Contender's match against El Grande Americano for the AAA Mega Championship. El Ojo would later attack Mini Vikingo on the January 31 episode of AAA. Omos lost the Fatal 4-Way match qualifier for the Rey de Reyes tournament to Americano on February 28. At Rey de Reyes on March 14, Vikingo lost to Dominik Mysterio after an interference by a returning Mini Vikingo helped Mysterio in neutralizing Omos. Omos assisted Vikingo in defeating El Hijo de Dr. Wagner Jr. for the AAA Latin American Championship at Noche de Los Grandes on May 30 despite interference by Galeno and Mini Vikingo.

Following Vikingo's injury, Omos and Roldán allied with Dominik Mysterio at Verano de Escándalo on July 25. Omos was scheduled to face Galeno and Damian Priest in the first round of the tournament to determine the new AAA Latin American Champion. However, he injured Galeno during a singles match on the August 22 episode of AAA, and was suspended indefinitely for attacking AAA general manager Rey Mysterio afterwards. As a result, Priest automatically advanced in the tournament. Omos returned on August 30 at Ola de Calor as a paying spectator and was attacked by Rey who challenged him to a match at Night One of Triplemanía 34 on September 11, with the stipulation that Omos could wrestle again in AAA if he won, but would be fired if he lost. Omos won the match with the help of Dominik and was reinstated. Omos would go on to win the 2026 Bardahl Cup at Night Two on September 13. Dominik however lost the AAA Mega Championship to El Grande Americano later that night despite an interference by Omos.

Americano challenged Dominik and Omos to a tag team match against him and Rey on the October 3 episode of AAA, earning Dominik the chance to challenge Americano for the AAA Mega Championship if his team won, but leaving him unable to ever challenge for the title again while Americano was champion if his team lost. Dominik and Omos would go on to win the match. At Night One of Héroes Inmortales on October 24, Americano defeated Dominik, with Omos' interference being neutralised by Pimpinela Escarlata and Rey.

== Personal life ==
Omogbehin has a younger brother and a niece living in Indiana. His parents and his other brother live in Nigeria.

In 2012, a medical test showed a pituitary tumor in his brain, which was deemed responsible for his high insulin-like growth factor-1 (IGF-1) levels, gigantism and Cushing's disease. The tumor was pressing on his optical nerves as well and would have caused blindness. He underwent surgeries in 2012 and 2013 to remove the tumor. His condition was the first known case of "pituitary gigantism or acromegaly associated with preclinical Cushing's disease" and it led to the publication of a case report on The American Journal of the Medical Sciences. He now requires lifelong hormone replacement therapy since his body no longer produces testosterone naturally.

Omogbehin married his longtime partner Cheyenne Quailey, a medical doctor who graduated with a Bachelor of Science from the University of South Florida on June 1, 2023, in Florida.

== Other media ==
Omos made his video game debut as a playable character in WWE 2K22, and since then has appeared in WWE Supercard, WWE Mayhem, WWE Champions, WWE 2K23, WWE 2K24, and WWE 2K25 and WWE 2K26.

== Championships and accomplishments ==
- Lucha Libre AAA Worldwide
  - Copa Bardahl (2025, 2026)
- Pro Wrestling Illustrated
  - Ranked No. 120 of the top 500 singles wrestlers in the PWI 500 in 2022
- Pro Wrestling Noah
  - GHC Tag Team Championship (1 time) – with Jack Morris
- WWE
  - WWE Raw Tag Team Championship (1 time) – with AJ Styles
  - The Rock 25th Anniversary Battle Royal
