= Lucha Libre AAA (TV program) =

Mexican professional wrestling television program

- Also known as: WWE Lucha Libre AAA; Lucha Libre AAA on Fox; AAA on Fox
- Genre: Professional wrestling Sports entertainment
- Created by: Paul "Triple H" Levesque; Dorian Roldán
- Presented by: José Manuel Guillén (play-by-play commentator); Roberto Figueroa (color commentator); Corey Graves (English play-by-play commentator); John "Bradshaw" Layfield (English color commentator); Rey Mysterio (English color commentator and interpreter/translator)
- Starring: AAA roster
- Country of origin: Mexico
- Original languages: Spanish; English
- No. of episodes: 42

Production
- Executive producers: Paul "Triple H" Levesque; Lee Fitting; Mark "The Undertaker" Calaway
- Production companies: Fillip IP 1, S. de R.L. de C.V. World Wrestling Entertainment, LLC

Original release
- Network: Fox/Fox One (Note: The weekly Lucha Libre AAA program airs on the Fox pay television channel and simulcasts on Fox One in Mexico and select Latin American countries.); Tubi (Note: The weekly Lucha Libre AAA program streams on Tubi in Mexico and select Latin American countries.)
- Release: January 17, 2026 – present

Related
- WWE Raw; WWE SmackDown; WWE NXT; WWE Evolve

Lucha Libre AAA, also referred to as WWE Lucha Libre AAA, Lucha Libre AAA on Fox, and simply AAA on Fox, is a Mexican-American professional wrestling television program produced by Lucha Libre AAA Worldwide (AAA) in partnership with its parent company WWE. The program features AAA wrestlers as well as wrestlers from WWE's Raw, SmackDown, NXT, and Evolve brands. The show currently airs every Saturday at 10 p.m. Eastern Time (ET) on Fox in Mexico and Latin America, Fox One and Tubi in Mexico and select Latin American markets, Fox's YouTube channel in South America, and in most other international markets on WWE's YouTube channel and Facebook page.

== History ==
On April 19, 2025, shortly after announcing a Worlds Collide joint event between its NXT brand division and Mexican lucha libre promotion AAA, WWE commentator Michael Cole announced during the WrestleMania 41 pre-show that WWE had reached an agreement to acquire AAA, as part of a joint venture with Mexican sports and entertainment company Fillip. The following month, it was reported that WWE will own 51% of AAA with Fillip owning the remaining 49%; the acquisition closed on August 1, 2025.

AAA held Triplemanía Regia III on June 15, 2025 at Arena Monterrey in Monterrey, Nuevo Leon, Mexico which was one of the final major events AAA held before the completion of the acquisition of the promotion by WWE. On August 16, 2025, during Triplemanía XXXIII, which AAA held in collaboration with WWE, it was announced that WWE and AAA would hold a second Worlds Collide event on Friday, September 12, 2025, at the Cox Pavilion at the Thomas & Mack Center in the Las Vegas suburb of Paradise, Nevada. The event occurred during Mexican independence day weekend and was held the day before the Canelo Álvarez vs. Terence Crawford boxing event at nearby Allegiant Stadium which was promoted by newly-launched WWE sister group Zuffa Boxing.

On November 22, 2025 and November 28, 2025, AAA co-produced two Alianzas events, with the first one being aired on Space and simulcast on YouTube and the second one being aired exclusively on WWE's YouTube channel.

On November 25, 2025, WWE announced a media rights agreement with Fox, which will see weekly AAA programming air on Fox properties in Mexico and Latin America beginning in 2026. The deal would also allow for special events like Rey de Reyes to be aired on the network beginning with their 2026 editions. It was later announced that the weekly AAA program would air in the United States on YouTube and Facebook. On December 10, 2025, AAA announced that they would hold their debut Lucha Libre AAA on Fox show on January 17, 2026 at Gimnasio Olímpico Juan de la Barrera in Mexico City. On January 15, 2026, AAA announced that WWE wrestler Omos would make an appearance on the first episode. On January 14, 2026, WWE announced that the first match would be a #1 contendership match for the AAA Mega Championship between El Grande Americano and El Hijo del Vikingo. Additional matches would be announced on January 15, 2026 including a non-title match between AAA Reina de Reinas Champion Flammer and Lady Shani and a six-man tag team match between La Parka, Mr. Iguana, and Niño Hamburguesa and Los Vipers (Abismo Negro Jr., Histeria, and Taurus) The first episode premiered live with tapings for an additional two weeks of episodes being held the same night. During the first week of Lucha Libre AAA on Fox's Noche de Los Grandes special, which aired live on May 30, 2026, "The Original" El Grande Americano was unmasked and revealed to be Chad Gable after the mask vs. mask match main event between the two El Grande Americanos.

On October 31, 2026, Lucha Libre AAA on Fox began airing in the United States on Fox Deportes in Spanish.

== Roster ==
The wrestlers featured on Lucha Libre AAA take part in scripted feuds and storylines. Wrestlers are portrayed as heroes (técnicos in Mexico), villains (referred to as rudos in Mexico), or less distinguishable characters in scripted events that build tension and culminate in a wrestling match.

The primary Spanish-language commentators for Lucha Libre AAA are José Manuel Guillén and Roberto Figueroa. The primary English-language commentators are Corey Graves, John "Bradshaw" Layfield, and Rey Mysterio with Mysterio also acting as an interpreter/translator. Mysterio additionally served as the General Manager of the program until November 7, 2026. AAA producer Savio Vega has served as an English-language commentator when Mysterio is unavailable.

Authority figures

Authority figure	Position	Date started	Date finished	Notes
Rey Mysterio	General Manager	May 23, 2026	November 7, 2026	AAA President Marisela Peña announced Mysterio as the general manager of AAA on the May 23, 2026 episode of Lucha Libre AAA; Mysterio was dismissed from his general manager role and suspended from AAA on the November 7, 2026 episode of Lucha Libre AAA due to an extramarital affair (kayfabe) with Peña
Dorian Roldán	Interim General Manager	November 14, 2026	–	Roldán was appointed as AAA's interim general manager by the AAA Board of Directors on the November 14, 2026 episode of Lucha Libre AAA

Commentators

Commentators	Date started	Date finished
José Manuel Guillén and Roberto Figueroa	January 17, 2026	–
Corey Graves, John "Bradshaw" Layfield, and Rey Mysterio	January 17, 2026	–

Ring announcers

Ring announcers	Date started	Date finished
Jesús Zuñiga	January 17, 2026	–

== Broadcasters ==
Country/Region	Channel	Timeslot	Years
(Mexico) Mexico; Latin America	Fox; Fox One; Tubi	Saturday 10–11 p.m. ET	January 17, 2026 – present
(United States) United States; Worldwide	YouTube/Facebook (Note: The weekly Lucha Libre AAA program streams on WWE's YouTube and Facebook pages in the United States and in most countries outside of Mexico.); Fox Deportes (Note: Since October 2026 the weekly Lucha Libre AAA program airs in the United States in Spanish on Fox Deportes.); Fox One (Note: Since October 2026, the weekly Lucha Libre AAA program streams in the United States in Spanish on Fox One.)	Saturday 10–11 p.m. ET	January 17, 2026 – present
South America	YouTube (Note: The weekly Lucha Libre AAA program streams on Fox's YouTube channel in South America.)	Saturday 10–11 p.m. ET	January 17, 2026 – present

== See also ==
- List of professional wrestling television series
