= Miguel Ramírez =

Miguel Ramírez may refer to:

- Miguel Ramírez (Dominican footballer) (born 1994), nicknamed Mon
- Miguel Ramírez (footballer, born 1970), Chilean football manager and former player
- Miguel Ramírez (footballer, born 2002), Mexican-American footballer, commonly known as Isco
- Miguel Ramírez de Salamanca (died 1534), Spanish prelate of the Roman Catholic Church
- Miguel Ramírez Salas (born 1968), Mexican footballer and manager
- Miguel Ángel Ramírez (born 1984), Spanish football manager
