= Triplemanía XXXIII =

2025 Lucha Libre AAA Worldwide event

- Promotional poster featuring various wrestlers
- Promotion(s): Lucha Libre AAA Worldwide; WWE (Note: WWE handled the production of this event.)
- Brand(s): Raw; SmackDown; NXT
- Date: August 16, 2025
- City: Azcapotzalco, Mexico City, Mexico
- Venue: Arena CDMX
- Attendance: 19,691

AAA event chronology
← Previous; Verano de Escándalo	Next → Worlds Collide: Las Vegas

Triplemanía chronology
← Previous; Regia III	Next → 34

Triplemanía XXXIII was a professional wrestling supercard event produced by the Mexican professional wrestling promotion Lucha Libre AAA Worldwide (AAA) in partnership with WWE. The event took place on August 16, 2025 at Arena CDMX in Mexico City. It was the 33rd mainline Triplemanía event, the 47th overall show held under the Triplemanía banner, and the first Triplemanía to be held under WWE's ownership of AAA. Additionally, wrestlers from WWE's Raw, SmackDown, and NXT brand divisions also appeared. The event was streamed live on WWE's YouTube channel with English and Spanish-language commentary.

Seven matches were contested at the event. In the main event, El Hijo del Vikingo defeated Dominik Mysterio, Dragon Lee, and El Grande Americano in a four-way match to retain the AAA Mega Championship following interference from AJ Styles. In other prominent matches, Pagano and Psycho Clown defeated Los Garza (Berto and Angel) in a Street Fight to win the AAA World Tag Team Championship and in the opening bout, Omos won the Copa Bardahl match.

== Production ==
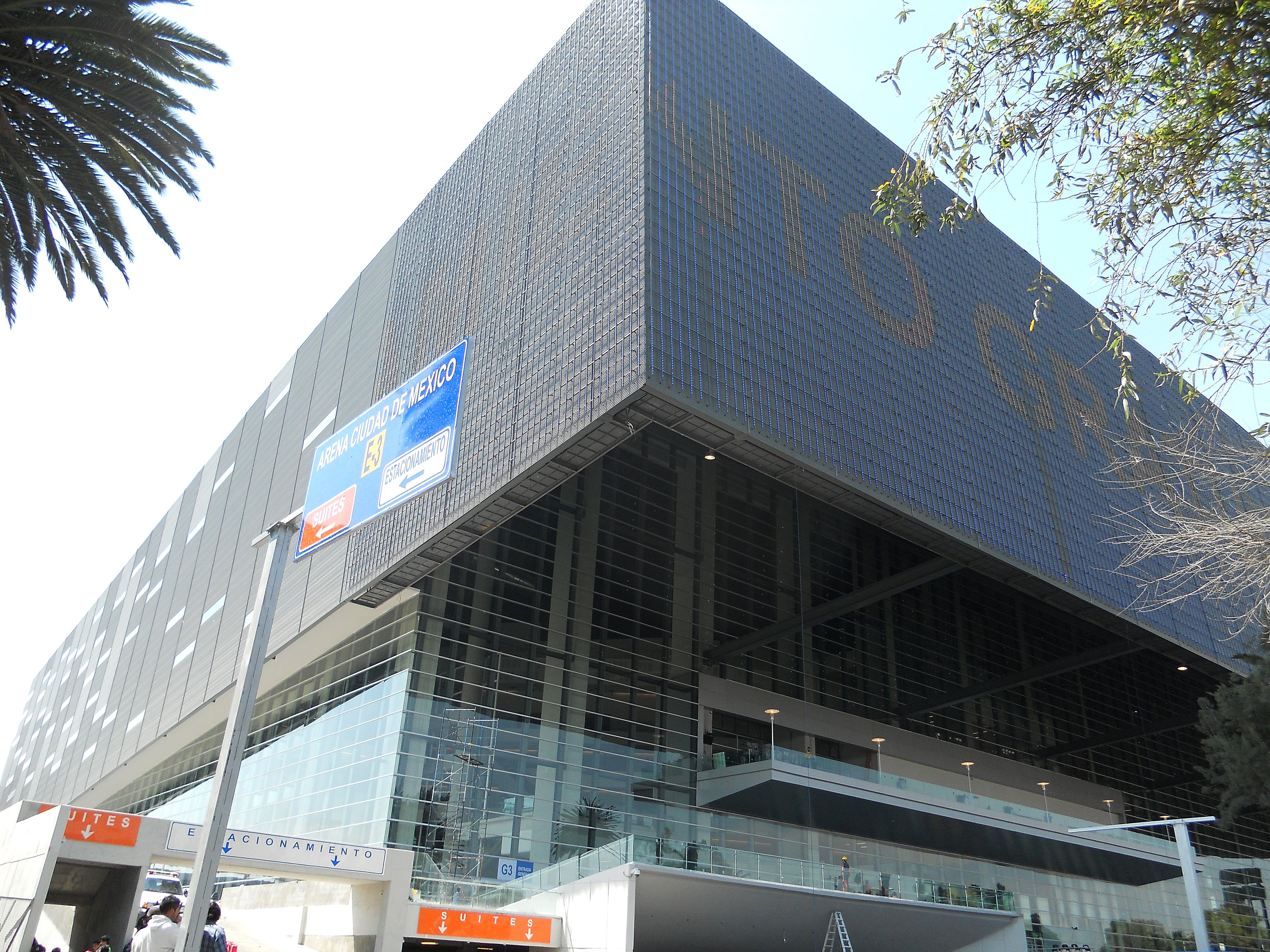
This edition of Triplemanía took place in Arena CDMX in Mexico City, Mexico.

=== Background ===
Other on-screen personnel
Role:	Name:
English commentators	Corey Graves
English commentators	John "Bradshaw" Layfield
English commentators	Konnan
Spanish commentators	Marcelo Rodríguez
Spanish commentators	José Manuel Guillén
Spanish commentators	Roberto Figueroa
Ring announcer	Jesús Zúñiga
Interviewers	Vero Rodríguez
Interviewers	Chuey Martinez

2025 marked the 33rd year that the Mexican professional wrestling company Lucha Libre AAA Worldwide (Triple A or AAA) will hold their annual flagship Triplemanía show. Triplemanía is the company's biggest show of the year, the AAA equivalent of WWE's WrestleMania or New Japan Pro-Wrestling's Wrestle Kingdom event. Triplemanía XXXIII will be the 47th overall Triplemanía show promoted by AAA (AAA promoted multiple Triplemanía shows over the summers of 1994 to 1997). Since the 2012 event, Triplemanía has taken place at the Arena Ciudad de México (Mexico City Arena), an indoor arena in Azcapotzalco, Mexico City, Mexico that has a maximum capacity of 22,300 spectators. On February 11, 2025, AAA announced that Triplemanía XXXIII would be held on August 16, 2025. It will be also the first Triplemanía event after WWE's deal to acquire AAA, as part of a joint venture with Mexican sports and entertainment company Fillip, closed on August 1, 2025.

On July 26, WWE's Chief Content Officer Paul "Triple H" Levesque announced that the event would stream live on YouTube.

=== Storylines ===
Triplemanía XXXIII featured seven professional wrestling matches, with different wrestlers involved in pre-existing scripted feuds, plots and storylines. Results were predetermined by AAA's booking team and WWE's writers, while storylines were produced on AAA events and on WWE's weekly television shows, Monday Night Raw, Friday Night SmackDown, and NXT.

After winning the AAA Mega Championship at Triplemanía Regia III, El Hijo del Vikingo appeared at the AAA Alianzas event on July 25 addressing the crowd before being interrupted by Dragon Lee and El Grande Americano, with Americano hurling insults until both Lee and Vikingo removed him from the ring. Later, a masked figure would attack both men before revealing himself as Dominik Mysterio, who then spoke to the audience in Spanish and walked out with the title. AAA later made the four-way match for the AAA Mega Championship between the wrestlers official for Triplemanía XXXIII.

On August 6, on a video released via WWE's social media channels, The Judgment Day (Finn Balor, JD McDonagh, and Raquel Rodriguez) issued a challenge to Mr. Iguana, Niño Hamburguesa, and NXT's Lola Vice for a mixed trios match at Triplemanía XXXIII; the match was later made official by WWE.

== Results ==
No.	Results	Stipulations	Times
1^{D}	El DiDi Préstamos Campeón defeated Monstruoso Estrés by pinfall	DiDi Loans singles match	—
2	Omos won by last eliminating La Parka	Bardahl Cup Battle Royal	26:30
3	El Hijo de Dr. Wagner Jr. defeated El Mesías (c) (with Dorian Roldán) by pinfall	Singles match for the AAA Latin American Championship	10:18
4	The Judgment Day (Finn Bálor, JD McDonagh, and Raquel Rodriguez) (with Roxanne Perez) defeated Mr. Iguana, Niño Hamburguesa, and Lola Vice by pinfall	Mixed trios match	11:51
5	Pagano and Psycho Clown defeated Los Garza (Berto and Angel) (c) by pinfall	Street Fight for the AAA World Tag Team Championship	12:54
6	Flammer (c) defeated Faby Apache and Natalya by pinfall	Three-way match for the AAA Reina de Reinas Championship	10:45
7	El Hijo del Vikingo (c) defeated Dominik Mysterio, Dragon Lee, and El Grande Americano by pinfall	Four-way match for the AAA Mega Championship	15:05
(c) / – the champion(s) heading into the match; D / – this was a dark match

=== Copa Bardahl ===
– AAA
– WWE Raw
– Winner

List of entrants and eliminations
Draw	Entrant	Eliminated by	Order	Elimination(s)
1	La Parka	Omos	13	1
2	Laredo Kid	Aero Star	1	0
3	Joaquin Wilde	Mecha Wolf	2	0
4	Abismo Negro Jr.	Omos	7	0
5	Taurus	Otis (wrestler) and Pimpinela Escarlata	4	0
6	Aero Star	Otis	3	1
7	Mecha Wolf	La Parka	11	2
8	Cruz Del Toro	Omos	8	0
9	Otis	Microman (pinfall)	9	4
10	Pimpinela Escarlata	Mecha Wolf and Otis (wrestler)	5	1
11	Cibernético	Microman and Otis (wrestler)	6	0
12	Microman	Omos	10	2
13	Omos	Winner	—	5
14	Octagón Jr.	Omos	12	0

== See also ==
- List of major Lucha Libre AAA Worldwide events
- List of WWE pay-per-view and livestreaming supercards
