= Miguel Ramírez Salas =

Mexican football manager

Miguel Ramírez
Personal information
- Full name: Miguel Ramírez Salas
- Date of birth: 29 September 1968 (age 58)
- Place of birth: Aguascalientes City, Aguascalientes, Mexico
- Height: 1.81 m (5 ft 11 in)
- Position: Defender

Senior career*
Years	Team	Apps	(Gls)
- Atlético Potosino

Managerial career
- 2010: Toros de Aguascalientes (Assistant)
- 2011–2017: Necaxa Reserves and Academy
- 2017: Necaxa (women)
- 2018–2020: Necaxa Reserves and Academy
- 2021–2023: Necaxa (women) (assistant)
- 2024: Necaxa (women)
- 2025: Necaxa U-19 (women)
- * Club domestic league appearances and goals

Miguel Ramírez Salas (born 29 September 1968) is a former professional Mexican footballer and manager who last played for Atlético Potosino and currently manages Necaxa (women) since 2024.

== Club career ==
Ramírez played in Atlético Potosino in the Liga MX.

== Coaching career ==
In 2011, Ramírez joined the staff of Toros de Aguascalientes. From 2011 to 2020 he was part of Necaxa Reserves and Academy, and in 2017 he coached the Necaxa (women) during one tournament. Since 2021, Ramírez was the assistant coach of Necaxa (women) in the Liga MX Femenil. In 2024, Ramírez was appointed for the second time as manager of Necaxa (women).
