= Deneva Cagigas =

Mexican footballer (born 1995)

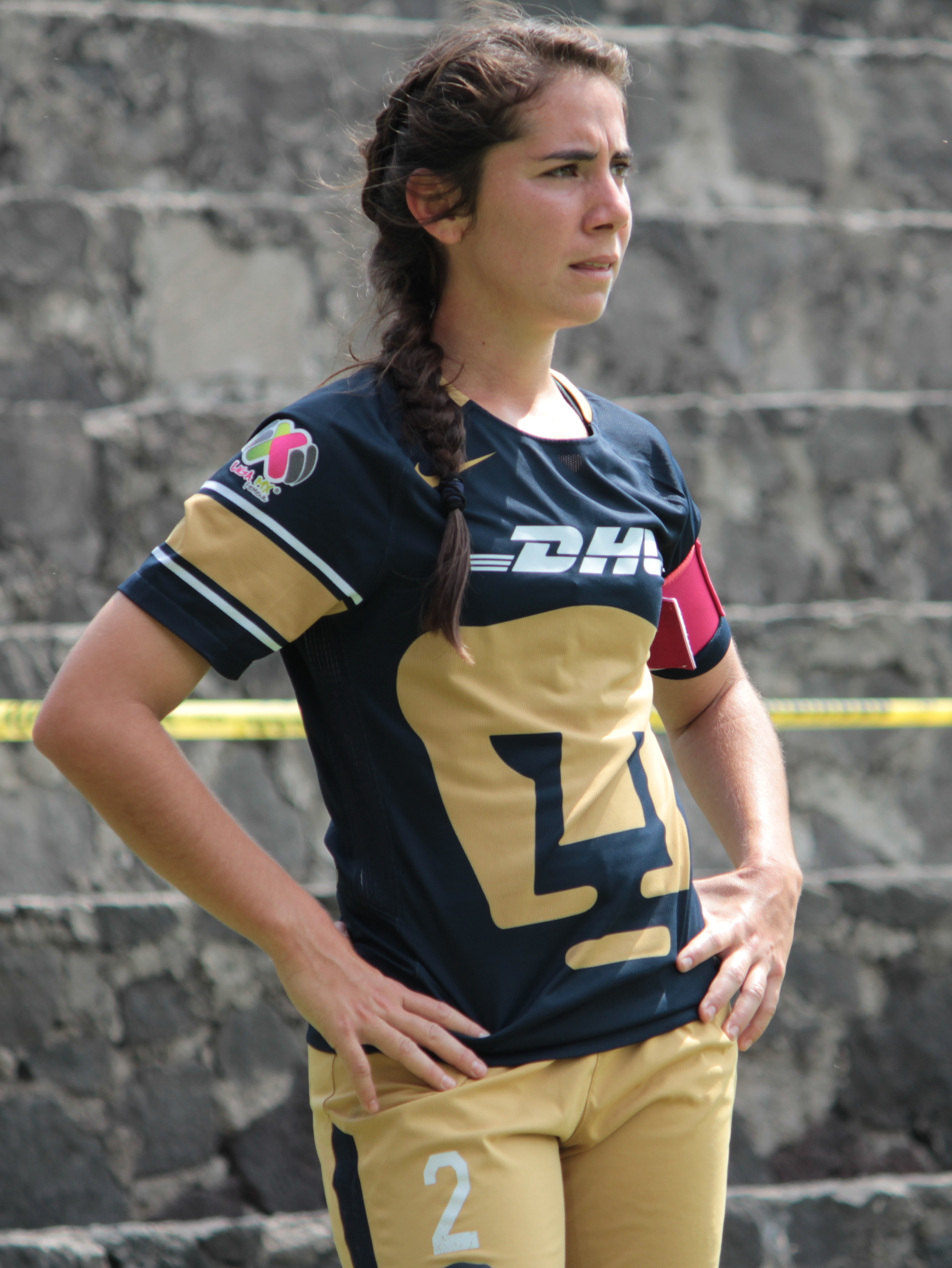
- Cagigas in 2018

Personal information
- Full name: Deneva Cagigas Gabilondo
- Date of birth: 1 April 1995 (age 31)
- Place of birth: Mexico City, Mexico
- Height: 1.61 m (5 ft 3 in)
- Position: Defender

Senior career*
Years	Team	Apps	(Gls)
2017–2023	UNAM	132	(5)
- * Club domestic league appearances and goals as of 12 February 2020

Deneva Cagigas Gabilondo (born 1 April 1995) is a Mexican former professional footballer who played as a defender for UNAM of the Liga MX Femenil.

== Playing career ==
Cagigas was selected as a player UNAM during the inaugural season of the Liga MX Femenil. She made her debut for the club as a starter in the 2017 Apertura tournament against C.F. Pachuca. In 2019, she captained the team.

== Other work ==
Cagigas has been an ambassador for adidas since 2018.
