= AAA Latin American Championship =

Professional wrestling championship

AAA Latin American Championship (Campeonato Latinoamericano AAA)
- The AAA Latin American Championship belt

Details
- Promotion: Lucha Libre AAA Worldwide
- Date established: June 18, 2011
- Current champion: La Parka
- Date won: August 30, 2026
Statistics
- First champion: Dr. Wagner Jr.
- Longest reign: Daga (553 days)
- Shortest reign: El Hijo del Vikingo (42 days)
- Oldest champion: El Mesías (48 years, 169 days)
- Youngest champion: El Hijo del Vikingo (29 years, 31 days)
- Heaviest champion: L.A. Park (116 kg (256 lb))
- Lightest champion: El Hijo del Vikingo (70 kg (150 lb))

The AAA Latin American Championship (Campeonato Latinoamericano AAA in Spanish) is a professional wrestling championship promoted by the Mexican promotion Lucha Libre AAA Worldwide (AAA), a sister promotion of WWE. The current champion is La Parka, who is in his first reign. He won the vacant title by defeating Damian Priest, El Fiscal, and El Hijo de Dr. Wagner Jr. in the finals of a tournament, which was contested as a fatal four-way match, at Ola de Calor on August 30, 2026. The title was previously vacated when previous champion El Hijo del Vikingo suffered a knee injury.

== History ==
The title was first announced on May 18, 2011, as part of a storyline, where wrestlers from American promotion Total Nonstop Action Wrestling (TNA) invaded AAA. It was revealed that on June 18 at Triplemanía XIX AAA's Dr. Wagner Jr. would face TNA's Rob Van Dam for the newly created AAA Latin American Championship. No qualification matches took place prior to the match. Wagner went on to defeat Van Dam in the main event of Triplemanía XIX to become the first champion. The physical belt was designed and crafted by All Star Championship Belts.

== Reigns ==
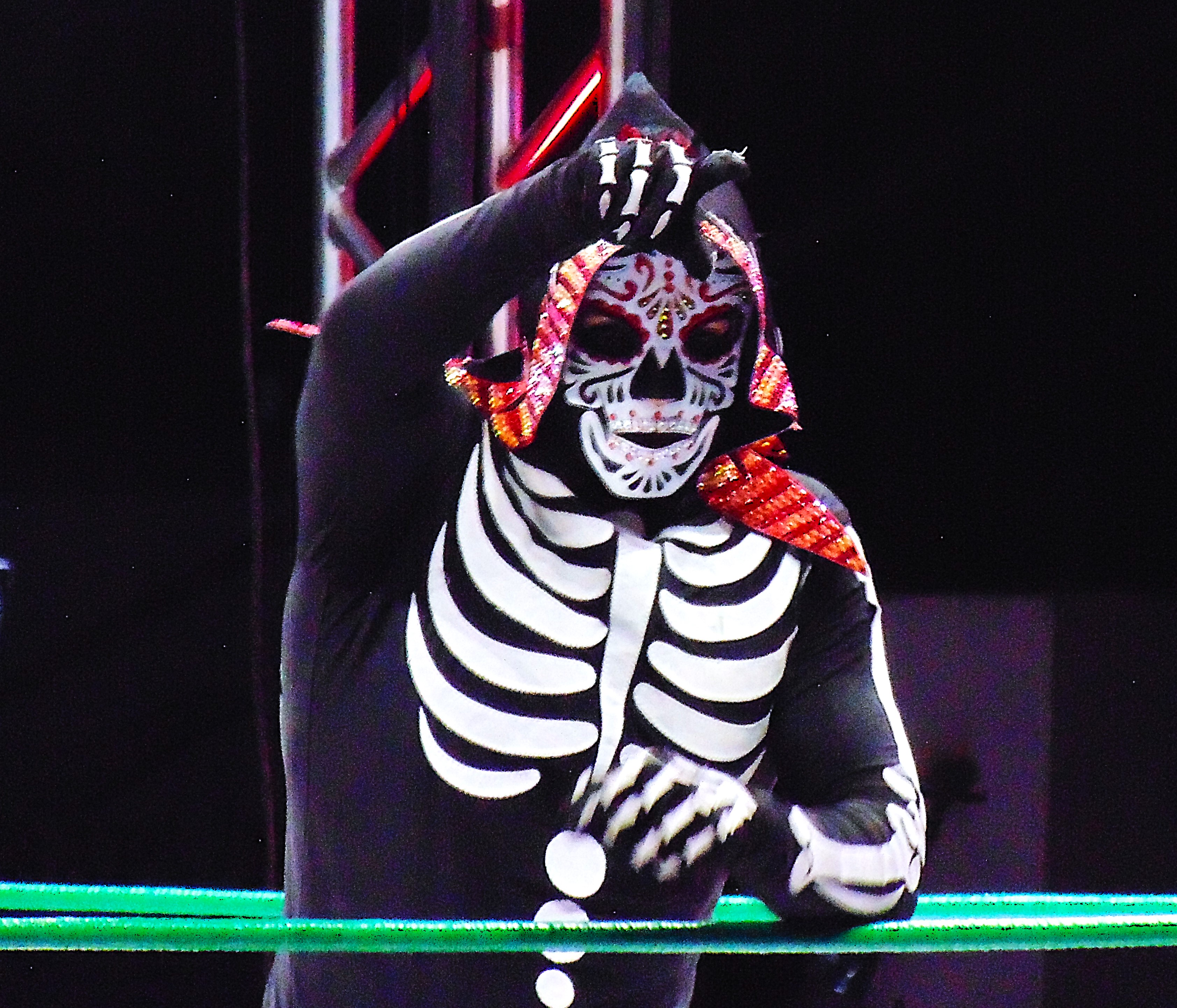
Current champion La Parka

Overall, there have been 17 reigns among 17 champions and 5 vacancies. The inaugural champion is Dr. Wagner Jr., who defeated Rob Van Dam at Triplemania XIX on June 18, 2011. Daga has the longest reign at 553 days, while El Hijo del Vikingo has the shortest reign at 42 days. Eight champions have held the title for over a year: L.A. Park, Chessman, Johnny Mundo, El Hijo del Fantasma, Daga, Taurus, Fénix, and Octagón Jr.. El Mesías is the oldest champion at 48 years and 169 days, while Vikingo is the youngest at 29 years and 31 days.

La Parka is the current champion in his first reign. He won the vacant title by defeating Damian Priest, El Fiscal, and El Hijo de Dr. Wagner Jr. in the finals of a tournament, which was contested as a fatal four-way match, at Ola de Calor in Edinburg, Texas, United States, on August 30, 2026. The title was previously vacated when previous champion El Hijo del Vikingo suffered a knee injury.

Key
No.	Overall reign number
Reign	Reign number for the specific champion
Days	Number of days held
Days recog.	Number of days held recognized by the promotion
+	Current reign is changing daily

No.	Champion	Championship change			Reign statistics			Notes	Ref.
No.	Champion	Date	Event	Location	Reign	Days	Days recog.	Notes	Ref.
Lucha Libre AAA Worldwide (AAA)
1	Dr. Wagner Jr.	June 18, 2011	Triplemanía XIX	Mexico City, Mexico	1	181	181	Defeated Rob Van Dam to become the inaugural champion.	
2	L.A. Park	December 16, 2011	Guerra de Titanes	Puebla, Puebla, Mexico	1	494	494		
—	Vacated	April 23, 2013	—	—	—	—	—	L.A. Park left AAA.	
3	Blue Demon Jr.	June 16, 2013	Triplemanía XXI	Mexico City, Mexico	1	273	273	Defeated El Mesías to win the vacant title.	
—	Vacated	March 16, 2014	Rey de Reyes	Monterrey, Nuevo León, Mexico	—	—	—	Blue Demon Jr. was unable to attend a scheduled title defense.	
4	Chessman	March 16, 2014	Rey de Reyes	Monterrey, Nuevo León, Mexico	1	533	525	Defeated Villano IV to win the vacant title. Aired on March 29.	
5	Psycho Clown	August 31, 2015	Sin Límite	Tehuacán, Puebla, Mexico	1	307	308	Aired on September 5.	
6	Pentagón Jr.	July 3, 2016	Sin Limite	Ecatepec de Morelos, Mexico	1	56	50	Aired on July 9.	
7	Johnny Mundo	August 28, 2016	Triplemanía XXIV	Mexico City, Mexico	1	399	399		
8	El Hijo del Fantasma	October 1, 2017	Héroes Inmortales XI	San Luis Potosí City, San Luis Potosí, Mexico	1	427	427	This was a 14-man Copa Antonio Peña battle royal.	
9	Drago	December 2, 2018	Guerra de Titanes	Aguascalientes City, Aguascalientes, Mexico	1	321	321		
10	Daga	October 19, 2019	Héroes Inmortales XIII	Orizaba, Veracruz, Mexico	1	553	553		
—	Vacated	April 24, 2021	—	—	—	—	—	Daga vacated the title due to a lack of challengers.	
11	Taurus	May 1, 2021	Rey de Reyes	San Pedro Cholula, Puebla, Mexico	1	413	413	Defeated Octagón Jr. and Villano III Jr. in a three-way match to win the vacant title.	
12	Fénix	June 18, 2022	Triplemanía XXX	Tijuana, Mexico	1	394	394	This Winner Takes All five-way match for the AAA Latin American Championship and the AAA World Cruiserweight Championship also featured Laredo Kid, Bandido, and Hijo del Vikingo.	
—	Vacated	July 17, 2023	—	—	—	—	—	Fénix left AAA due to his commitments with other promotions.	
13	Q.T. Marshall	August 12, 2023	Triplemanía XXXI	Azcapotzalco, Mexico City, Mexico	1	99	99	Defeated Pentagón Jr., Dralístico, and Texano Jr. in a four-way match to win the vacant title.	
14	Octagón Jr.	November 19, 2023	Guerra de Titanes	Ciudad Juárez, Chihuahua, Mexico	1	357	357		
15	El Mesias	November 10, 2024	Guerra de Titanes	Ciudad Juárez, Chihuahua, Mexico	1	279	279		
16	El Hijo de Dr. Wagner Jr.	August 16, 2025	Triplemanía XXXIII	Azcapotzalco, Mexico City, Mexico	1	287	287		
17	El Hijo del Vikingo	May 30, 2026	Noche de Los Grandes	Monterrey, Nuevo León, Mexico	1	42	42		
—	Vacated	July 11, 2026	Lucha Libre AAA	San Luis Potosí, San Luis Potosí, Mexico	—	—	—	AAA General Manager Rey Mysterio vacated the title after previous champion El Hijo del Vikingo suffered a knee injury.	
18	La Parka	August 30, 2026	Ola de Calor	Edinburg, Texas, U.S.	1	69+	69+	Defeated Damian Priest, El Fiscal, and El Hijo de Dr. Wagner Jr. in the finals of a tournament, which was contested as a fatal four-way match, to win the vacant championship.	

== See also ==
- List of current champions in Lucha Libre AAA Worldwide
