= Fox (Latin American TV channel) =

Latin American sports pay television channel

FOX
- Somos Fox (We are Fox)
- Broadcast area: Mexico; Guatemala; Honduras; El Salvador; Nicaragua; Costa Rica; Panama
- Headquarters: Mexico City, Mexico

Ownership
- Owner: Fox Corporation

History
- Launched: 25 September 2023 (as Caliente TV); 29 July 2025 (as Fox Mexico); 27 May 2026 (as Fox Latin America)
- Former names: Caliente TV (Mexico, 2023–2025); Tigo Sports Centroamérica (2014–2026)

Links
- Website: https://foxone.mx/

Fox (stylized in all caps as FOX, formerly Caliente TV and Tigo Sports Centroamérica) is a Latin American privately owned sports pay television channel launched on 25 September 2023.

It started in Mexico as Caliente TV, owned by the Grupo Caliente. Fox Corporation bought the outlet on 19 June 2025, and adopted its current name on 4 August that year. In Mexico, the channel is broadcast on the Fox-owned streaming services Tubi and Fox One as well as on third-party pay television services.

This channel is named "Fox" – not "Fox Sports" – due to the legal dispute with the owners of the Mexican channel using the "Fox Sports" name, Grupo Lauman, who ultimately lost and was forced by U.S. courts to pay $6 million to Fox Corporation.

== History ==
Fox Latin America initially started its activities in Mexico, after the announced on 19 June 2025 its acquisition of Mexican sports streaming platform Caliente TV to expand its presence in sports broadcasting presence in and throughout Latin America, which will also include a subscription television channel and a paid streaming service. Caliente TV officially rebranded to FOX on 28 July. The last show broadcast under the Caliente TV name was Los Primos, which was followed by Season 2 of Desencajados, now under the FOX banner. The social media accounts of Caliente TV also changed names, going from "Deportes Caliente TV" ("Caliente TV Sports") to "Somos FOX" ("We are Fox"). FOX would be available via Tubi from 5 August and that its formal broadcasts on pay TV systems, as well as digital streaming via the paid Caliente TV service (which would retain the previous channel's name), would begin on 1 September 2025. However, the full rollout on pay TV had not been completed, with the channel being officially available on only one system as of 17 September.

In early 2026, Fox started expanding further into Latin America, starting with the announcement of a deal with NASCAR

Later, in April 13, 2026, Fox Corp. announced the acquisition of the centro-american division of Tigo Sports, taking over operations in Guatemala, Honduras, El Salvador, Nicaragua, Costa Rica and Panama, later, in May, starting in Costa Rica, local branches of Tigo Sports started being rebranded into Fox and Fox+ Channels, ahead of the 2026 FIFA World Cup.

== Sports coverage ==
=== Football ===
- UEFA Champions League (50%, only Mexico)
- Premier League (50%)
- FA Cup (50%)
- FA Community Shield
- Supercoppa Italiana
- Women's Super League
- Women's League Cup
- Liga MX
- Liga MX Femenil
- Ligue 1 (only Mexico)
- Première Ligue
- Trophée des Championnes (only Mexico)
- Coppa Italia
- Serie A Femminile
- Coppa Italia (women)
- Saudi Pro League
- CONCACAF Nations League (only Central America)
- CONCACAF Champions Cup (only Mexico)
- CONCACAF Central American Cup (only Mexico)
- CONCACAF Caribbean Cup (only Mexico)
- UEFA Youth League (only Mexico)
- UEFA Europa League (50%, only Central America)
- UEFA Conference League (50%, only Central America)
- Africa Cup of Nations
- Bundesliga
- Franz Beckenbauer Supercup
- Frauen-Bundesliga

=== Motorsport ===
- NASCAR Mexico Series
- NASCAR Cup Series
- NASCAR O'Reilly Auto Parts Series
- NASCAR Craftsman Truck Series
- Formula E
- FIA World Endurance Championship
- World Rally Championship
- IMSA SportsCar Championship
- Motocross World Championship

=== Baseball ===
- Major League Baseball
- Mexican Baseball League
- Mexican Pacific League

=== American football ===
- NFL
- UFL

=== Softball ===
- Mexican Softball League

=== Mixed martial arts ===
- Professional Fighters League

=== Professional wrestling ===
- Lucha Libre AAA Worldwide

=== Padel ===
- Pro Padel League

=== Other sports ===
- Big Ten Conference

== Programs ==
- Codigo FOX Futbol
- Fox Cuadro Titular
- Especialistas
- Desencajados
- La Redacción
- Mother Soccer
- Los Espartanos
- Fox 365
- Referentes
- Fox NFL Weekly
- El Chiringuito de Jugones

== Notable members ==
- (Mexico) Alberto García Aspe
- (Ecuador) Álex Aguinaga
- (Mexico) Alfredo Morales
- (Mexico) Alonso Basurto
- (Mexico) Alonso Cabral
- (Mexico) Ana Valero
- (Mexico) Andrés González
- (Mexico) Andy Guillaumin
- (Mexico) Ángel García Toraño
- (Mexico) Antonio Valls
- (Mexico) Arantza Fernández
- (Mexico) Arturo Brizio Carter
- (Mexico) Ashley González
- (Mexico) Brenda Alvarado
- (Mexico) Carlos Rosado
- (Mexico) (Argentina) Christian Giménez
- (Spain) Claudia García
- (Mexico) Claudio Suárez
- (Israel) (Argentina) Daniel Brailovsky
- (Mexico) Daniela Noguez
- (Mexico) Deneva Cagigas
- (Mexico) Diego Venegas
- (Mexico) Emilio León
- (Mexico) Eugenio Tamės
- (Mexico) Fabrizio Domínguez
- (Mexico) Félix Fernández
- (Mexico) Fernanda Cortéz
- (Mexico) Fernando Cevallos
- (Mexico) Fernando Lara
- (Mexico) Fernando Navarro
- (Mexico) Francisco "Paco" Montes
- (Mexico) Francisco Palencia
- (Mexico) (Argentina) Gabriel Caballero
- (Mexico) Gabriel Medina Espinosa
- (Mexico) Gerardo Suárez
- (Argentina) Hernán Cristante
- (Mexico) Iñaki Álvarez
- (Mexico) Israel López
- (Mexico) Iván Lopez Elizondo
- (Mexico) Ivonne Almaraz
- (Mexico) Jackie Félix
- (Mexico) Jaqueline Almodóvar
- (Mexico) Jair Pereira
- (United States) John Laguna
- (Mexico) Jorge Arriola
- (Mexico) Jorge Carlos Mercader
- (Mexico) Jorge Sánchez
- (Mexico) Jorge Torres
- (Mexico) Jorge Torres Nilo
- (Mexico) Jorge van Rankin
- (Mexico) José Pablo Coello
- (Mexico) José Ramón Llaca
- (Mexico) José Hernández
- (Mexico) Juan Buxadé
- (Mexico) Juan Carlos Casco
- (Mexico) Juan Carlos Ibarrarán
- (Mexico) Juan Carlos Valenzuela
- (Mexico) Juan José Rueda
- (Mexico) Juan Pablo Fernández
- (Mexico) Kat Rivera
- (Spain) Lola Hernández
- (Mexico) Lorena Troncoso
- (Mexico) Luis Enrique Alfonzo
- (Mexico) Luis Manuel "Chacho" López
- (Mexico) Luis Ramírez
- (Mexico) Majo Montemayor
- (Guatemala) Maria Celeste Paredes
- (Mexico) Mariano Trujillo
- (Mexico) Mauricio "Tyson" López
- (Mexico) Munir Silveyra
- (Mexico) Natalia Cruz
- (Mexico) Natalia León
- (Mexico) Oscar Mendoza
- (Mexico) Paco Bolívar
- (Mexico) Paulina Chavira
- (Mexico) Rafael Márquez Lugo
- (Mexico) Rafael Puente
- (Mexico) Ramón Cáceres
- (Mexico) Raúl Allegre
- (Mexico) Raúl Méndez
- (Mexico) Raúl Orvañanos
- (Mexico) René Trejo
- (Mexico) Ricardo Pato Galindo
- (Mexico) Ricardo Murguía
- (Mexico) Ricardo Sales
- (Mexico) Rob Testas
- (Mexico) Rodolfo Landeros
- (Mexico) Rodrigo Arana
- (Mexico) Rubén Rodríguez
- (Argentina) Rubén Omar Romano
- (Argentina) Santiago Fourcade
- (Mexico) Virginia Ramírez
- (Mexico) Yosgart Gutiérrez

== See also ==
- Television in Mexico
