= La Parka (wrestler, born 1999) =

Mexican professional wrestler (born 1999)

La Parka (III)
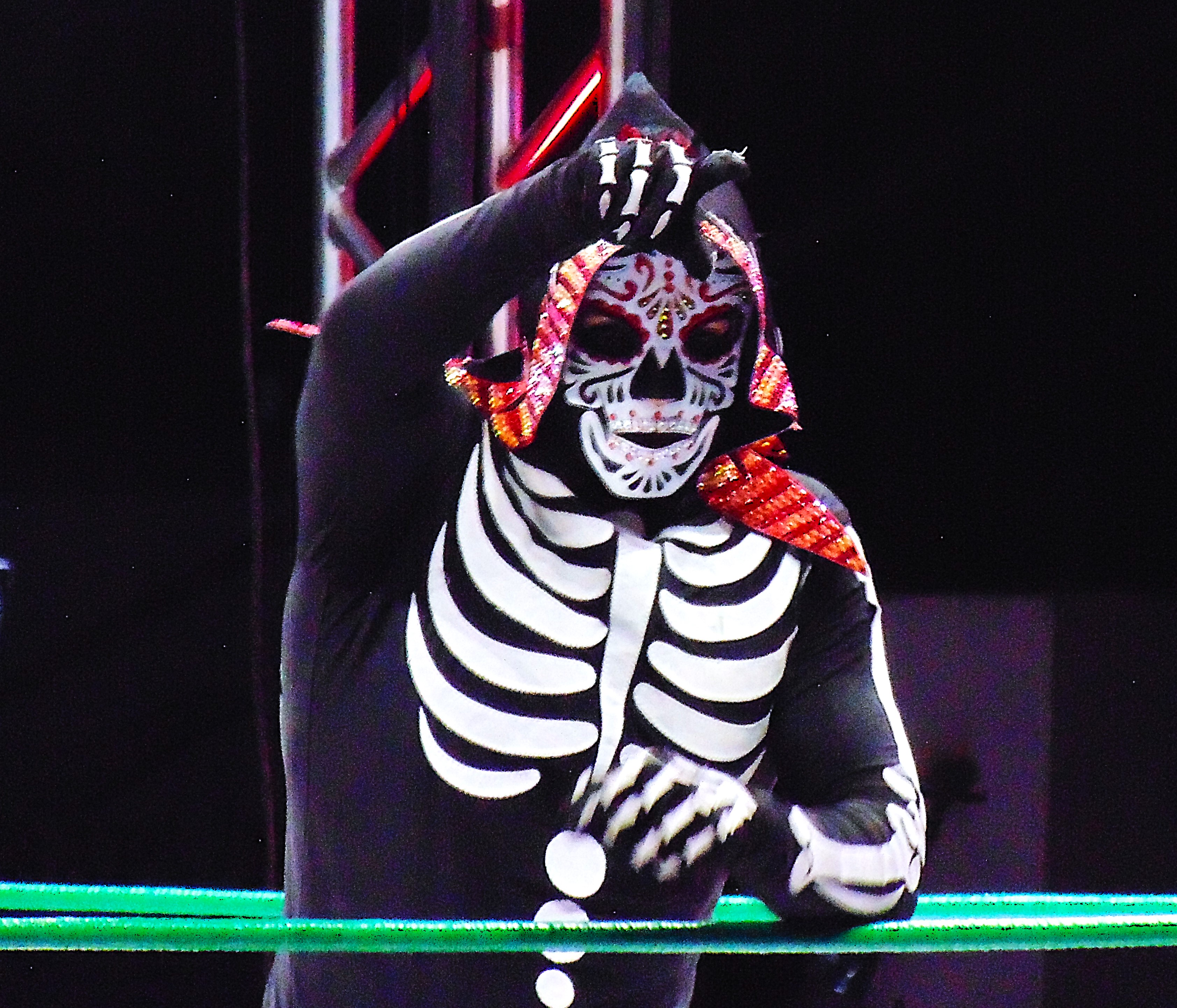
- La Parka in 2026

Personal information
- Born: June 14, 1999 (age 27) Mexico City, Mexico
- Spouse: La Hiedra (m. 2025)
- Relatives: Brazo de Oro (grandfather); Psycho Clown (uncle); La Máscara (uncle); Máximo Sexy (uncle); Goya Kong (aunt)
- Family: The Alvarado family

Professional wrestling career
- Ring names: Brazo de Oro Jr. (II); La Parka (III)
- Billed height: 191 cm (6 ft 3 in)
- Billed weight: 90 kg (198 lb)
- Billed from: Mexico City, Mexico
- Trained by: Brazo de Oro; El Hijo del Gladiador; Flavio Meza
- Debut: 2013

La Parka (born June 14, 1999) is the ring name of a Mexican professional wrestler. He is signed to WWE, where he performs in its sister promotion Lucha Libre AAA Worldwide (AAA) and is the current AAA Latin American Champion in his first reign.

La Parka's real name is not a matter of public record, as is often the case with masked wrestlers in Mexico where their private lives are kept a secret from wrestling fans. He is a part of the Alvarado wrestling family, the grandson of Brazo de Oro and nephew of La Máscara and Psycho Clown. He is the third wrestler to use the ring name "La Parka" and the second wrestler to use the name Brazo de Oro Jr., the latter which he originally used.

== Professional wrestling career ==
La Parka made his professional wrestling debut in September 2013, wearing a mask and using the ring name "Brazo de Oro Jr." a tribute to his grandfather. This ring name was previously used by his uncle La Máscara. In 2019, Brazo de Oro Jr. became part of the stable Los Bad Boys alongside Brazo Celestial and Brazo Cibernetico, with whom he won the DTU Nexo Championship and AULL Trios Championship.

On March 22, 2025, at Rey de Reyes, La Parka made his debut appearance as the third version of that character. At Triplemanía XXXIII, he competed at the 2025 Bardahl Cup. At WWE's Royal Rumble on 31 January 2026, La Parka made his men's Royal Rumble match debut as the eighteenth entrant and was eliminated by Austin Theory. At Ola de Calor on August 30, Parka won a tournament to earn the AAA Latin American Championship, his first title in AAA.

== Championships and accomplishments ==
- Alianza Universal De Lucha Libre
  - AULL Trios Championship (1 time) – with Brazo Celestial and Brazo Cibernetico
- Desastre Total Ultraviolento
  - DTU Nexo Championship (1 time) – with Brazo Celestial and Brazo Cibernetico
- Lucha Libre AAA Worldwide
  - AAA Latin American Championship (1 time, current)
- Pro Wrestling Illustrated
  - Ranked No. 245 of the top singles wrestlers in the PWI 500 in 2026
