= Ludwig Kaiser =

German professional wrestler (born 1990)

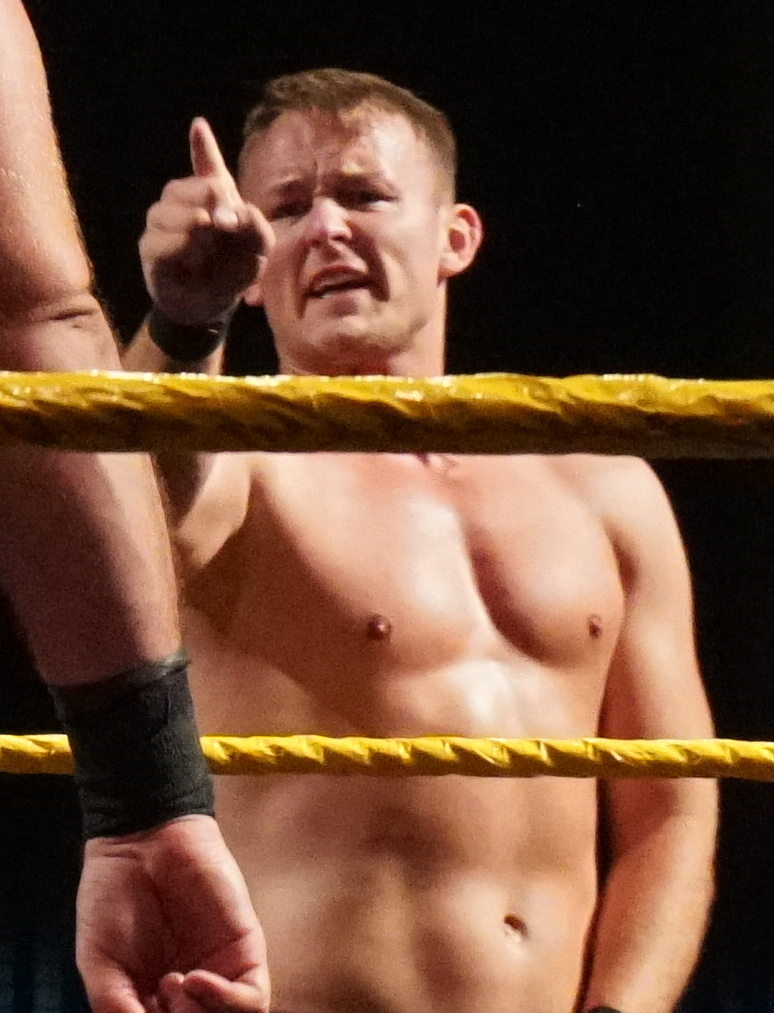
- Kaiser in 2018

Personal information
- Born: Marcel Barthel; 8 July 1990 (age 36) Pinneberg, West Germany

Professional wrestling career
- Ring name(s): Axel Dieter Jr. El Grande Americano (II); Ludwig Kaiser; Marcel Barthel
- Billed height: 6 ft 3 in (191 cm)
- Billed weight: 220 lb (100 kg)
- Billed from: Hamburg, Germany; Gulf of Mexico; Gulf of America; Tangamandapio, Mexico
- Trained by: Axel Dieter; Christian Eckstein; Karsten Kretschmer
- Debut: 1 March 2008

Marcel Barthel (born 8 July 1990), better known by his ring name Ludwig Kaiser, is a German professional wrestler. As of June 2017, he is signed to WWE, where he performs on the Raw brand and in sister promotion Lucha Libre AAA Worldwide (AAA), as the second incarnation of the masked wrestler El Grande Americano, and is the AAA Mega Champion in his first reign. He is also the leader of the Los Americanos stable.

A second-generation wrestler, Barthel was trained by his father and debuted under the ring name Axel Dieter Jr. for Westside Xtreme Wrestling (wXw), where he became a two-time World Tag Team Champion and one-time Unified World Wrestling Champion. He signed with WWE in 2017 and was assigned to NXT under his real name, joining the Imperium stable where he won the NXT Tag Team Championship twice with Fabian Aichner. Imperium was moved to the main roster in 2022 where Barthel was renamed as Ludwig Kaiser. Due to injury, Barthel took over the role of El Grande Americano from Chad Gable in 2025. As Americano, Barthel is a former one-time WWE Speed Champion.

== Early life ==
Marcel Barthel was born 8 July 1990 in Pinneberg, Schleswig-Holstein, which was then part of West Germany prior to reunification two months later. He is a second-generation professional wrestler; his father, Axel Dieter (1933–2015), was later at ringside for his championship win in Westside Xtreme Wrestling (wXw) when he became one-half of the wXw World Tag Team Champions. His father was also a child soldier during World War II, fighting first for Nazi Germany before defecting to France, all before he was 12 years old. He later joined the French Foreign Legion.

== Professional wrestling career ==
=== Westside Xtreme Wrestling (2008–2019, 2024) ===
Barthel was trained by his father Axel Dieter, Christian Eckstei, and Karsten Kretschmer. He debuted under the ring name Axel Dieter Jr. at NFC New Years Fight Night II on 1 March 2008, wrestling Da Mack to a time limit draw. He made his debut for Westside Xtreme Wrestling (wXw) in January 2009, losing to Dan Marshall. He did not have his next match in wXw until July 2012, when he and Da Mack defeated Walter and Michael Isotov. Dieter and Da Mack would go on to form a regular team, dubbing themselves Hot & Spicy. On 16 November 2013, they defeated The AUTsiders (Walter and Robert Dreissker) to win the wXw World Tag Team Championship. Dieter and Da Mack made seven successful defences of the championship, defeating the likes of The Sumerian Death Squad (Tommy End and Michael Dante), Forever Hooligans (Rocky Romero and Alex Koslov), and Kazuki Hashimoto and Ryuichi Kawakami. They lost the championships to Matt Striker and Trent? on 15 March 2014, but won them back in a rematch the following day. On 6 April, Dieter received his first opportunity at the wXw Shotgun Championship, losing to Axel Tischer. After over a combined year as wXw World Tag Team Champions, Dieter and Da Mack were defeated by French Flavour (Lucas Di Leo and Peter Fischer) on 18 October, bringing their reign to an end.

On 22 November 2014, Dieter unsuccessfully challenged Walter for the wXw Unified World Wrestling Championship. In February 2015, he took part in the Four Nations Cup, defeating Timothy Thatcher in the final to win the tournament. In March, Dieter took part in the 16 Carat Gold Tournament, defeating Zack Sabre Jr. in the semi-final to advance to the final, where he lost to Tommy End. In October, after a short break, Hot & Spicy teamed together once again and made it to the semi-finals of the 2015 World Tag Team Tournament before losing to reDRagon (Kyle O'Reilly and Bobby Fish). In March 2016, Dieter once again took part in the 16 Carat Gold Tournament, defeating Drew Galloway in the semi-final to advance to the final, where he lost to Sabre, the man he defeated to advance to the final in the previous year's tournament. On 2 September, Dieter and Da Mack faced off against each other, with Da Mack coming out on top and retaining his wXw Shotgun Championship. In late 2016, Dieter joined Ringkampf, and on 10 December, he defeated Marty Scurll to win the wXw Unified World Wrestling Title. Dieter held the championship until March 2017, when he was defeated by Jurn Simmons. In April, Dieter announced that he would be leaving wXw to pursue further opportunities outside of Germany. On 30 April, wXw held a farewell show for him, titled Die Matte Ist Heilig: Farewell to Axel Dieter Junior. In his final match as a full-time member of wXw, he teamed with Ringkampf stablemate Walter to defeat his long-time partner Da Mack and his long-time rival Simmons.

Due to wXw's working relationship with WWE, Barthel was able to make occasional appearances for the promotion. At the 17th Anniversary Show, in an untelevised segment, Barthel and Alexander Wolfe saved Walter and Thatcher after they were ambushed by members of the Rise stable. On 30 October 2018, it was confirmed that Barthel, under the Axel Dieter Jr. name, would return to wXw as a part of their 18th Anniversary Show on 22 December. At the event, he teamed with Walter and Thatcher to defeat British Strong Style (Pete Dunne, Trent Seven and Tyler Bate). In March 2019, he participated in the 16 Carat Gold Tournament, defeating Marius Al-Ani in the first round, before being eliminated by Lucky Kid in the quarter final. On the third night, he reunited with Da Mack, where they defeated Jay FK (Jay Skillet and Francis Kaspin).

On 23 November 2024, at Broken Rules, Barthel (as Ludwig Kaiser) returned to wXw for the first time since 2019.

=== Progress Wrestling (2017–2018) ===
Representing wXw and Ringkampf, Dieter made his debut for Progress Wrestling in the UK on 15 January 2017, alongside Walter, defeating The London Riots (James Davis and Rob Lynch). They returned to the promotion on 29 January, losing to The South Pacific Power Trip (TK Cooper and Travis Banks). They once again returned on 19 March, defeating The Hunter Brothers (Jim and Lee Hunter). In his first singles match, Dieter lost to Mark Haskins. On 23 April, Dieter, Walter, and Timothy Thatcher unsuccessfully challenged British Strong Style (Pete Dunne, Trent Seven, and Tyler Bate) in a six-man tag team match for all of British Strong Style's championships.

On 30 December 2018, Barthel made a surprise appearance at Progress' Unboxing event, where he was defeated by Eddie Dennis.

=== WWE / Lucha Libre AAA Worldwide ===
==== Imperium (2017–2025) ====
On 30 June 2017, Barthel signed with WWE and was assigned to WWE's developmental territory NXT. He made multiple appearances at the NXT live events before making his television debut under his real name on 8 August 2018 episode of NXT, where he lost to Keith Lee. Barthel then formed a tag team with Fabian Aichner, with whom he would compete on both the NXT and NXT UK brands.

On 22 May 2019 episode of NXT UK, Barthel and Aichner helped Walter retain the United Kingdom Championship, forming the stable Imperium. On 13 May 2020 episode of NXT, Barthel and Aichner defeated Matt Riddle and Timothy Thatcher (replacing Riddle's original partner Pete Dunne) to win the NXT Tag Team Championship. After successful title defenses against teams like Oney Lorcan and Danny Burch, and The Undisputed Era, Imperium lost the titles on 26 August episode of NXT to Breezango (Tyler Breeze and Fandango), ending their reign at 105 days. On 26 October 2021, at NXT: Halloween Havoc, Barthel and Aichner defeated MSK in a lumberjack tag team match to win the NXT Tag Team Championship for the second time. On 5 December at NXT WarGames, they successfully defended the titles against Kyle O'Reilly and Von Wagner. On 2 April 2022 at NXT Stand & Deliver, they lost the titles back to MSK in a triple threat tag team match also involving The Creed Brothers, ending their reign at 158 days. On the 5 April episode of NXT, Barthel and Aichner faced The Creed Brothers in a losing effort, with Aichner walking out of their match.

On the 8 April episode of SmackDown, Barthel debuted under the new ring name Ludwig Kaiser, accompanying his Imperium stablemate Walter (now called Gunther) in a squash match against Joe Alonzo. His new surname came from Gustl Kaiser, a wrestling promoter during the time when his father was active as a professional wrestler. On the 27 May episode of SmackDown, Kaiser had his first match on the main roster, teaming with Gunther to defeat Drew Gulak and Intercontinental Champion Ricochet. A feud with The Brawling Brutes ensued for several months, which also included the return of Aichner (now called Giovanni Vinci) to Imperium and resulted in two Intercontinental Champion matches between Gunther and Sheamus. As part of the 2023 WWE Draft, Kaiser and his Imperium stablemates Gunther and Vinci were drafted to the Raw brand. On 23 April 2024 episode of Raw, Kaiser attacked Vinci and kicked him out of Imperium after they lost to The New Day.

On 30 August episode of SmackDown in Berlin, Kaiser answered LA Knight's open challenge for the United States Championship, but lost. At Survivor Series on 30 November, he lost a triple threat match for the Intercontinental Championship against Sheamus and Intercontinental Champion Bron Breakker. On 1 February 2025, at Royal Rumble, Kaiser entered the eponymous match at #13, but was eliminated by Penta in six seconds. On 24 February 2025 episode of Raw, Kaiser won a triple threat match against Penta and Pete Dunne. On 17 March episode of Raw, Kaiser lost a no holds barred match against Penta. After this match, Kaiser did not appear on Raw for over three months and Imperium quietly disbanded.

==== El Grande Americano (2025–present) ====
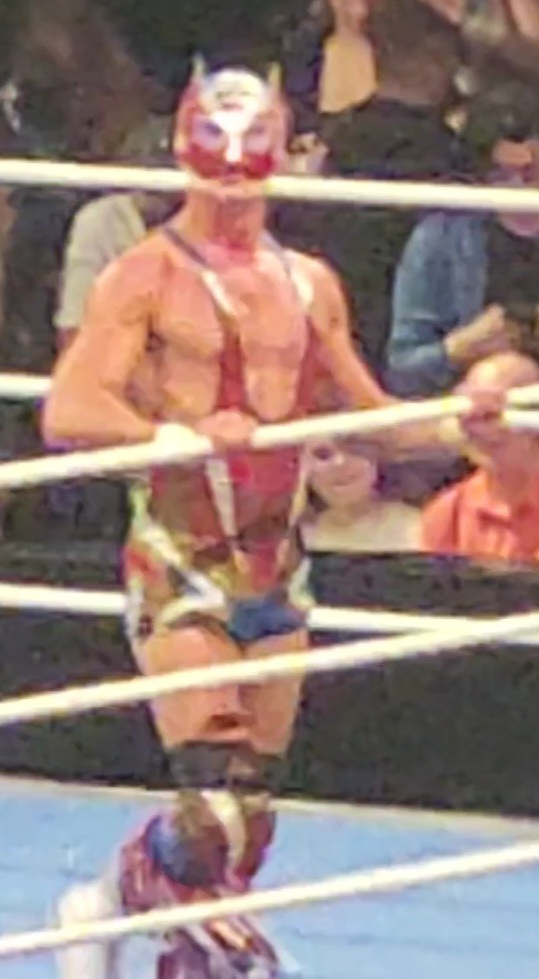
Kaiser portraying El Grande Americano in August 2025

On 30 June episode of Raw, Kaiser began portraying the masked luchador El Grande Americano after Chad Gable, the first person to portray the character, sustained a legitimate injury. As a result, Kaiser also inherited Americano's Speed Championship from Gable, a title he held until 11 November episode of NXT where he lost it to Jasper Troy—this ended the Americano character's reign at 190 days (188 as recognized by WWE), the official longest reign for the title, while for Kaiser solely, this ended his portion of the reign at 134 days. Beginning in July 2025, Kaiser (As El Grande Americano) began to make appearances for WWE partner promotion Lucha Libre AAA Worldwide (AAA), wrestling for the AAA Mega Championship at Triplemanía XXXIII on 16 August. Although initially wrestling as a heel, Americano would turn técnico in AAA, receiving acclaim for his character work as Americano. During this time, Pete Dunne and Tyler Bate began appearing as Rayo Americano and Bravo Americano, beginning a stable referred to as Los Americanos. While he transitioned into a face character in Mexico, he kept the heel character in USA.

At the Royal Rumble on 31 January 2026, Americano started a feud with his predecessor, now referred to as "The Original" El Grande Americano. Americano would go on to win the Rey De Reyes tournament on 14 March 2026, defeating "The Original" El Grande Americano (Chad Gable), La Parka, and Santos Escobar in the final, receiving a future AAA Mega Championship match for his victory. Their feud culminated at Noche de Los Grandes, where Americano defeated "The Original" in a máscara contra máscara. Dave Meltzer of the Wrestling Observer Newsletter rated the match 5 3/4 stars, making it the highest-rated match produced by WWE in history. At Night 2 of Triplemanía 34 on 13 September, Americano defeated Dominik Mysterio in a No Disqualification match to win the AAA Mega Championship, the first world championship victory of his WWE career. At Héroes Inmortales on 24 October, Americano retained the title against Mysterio.

== Professional wrestling persona ==
In wXw, Barthel wrestled as Axel Dieter Jr. and was a member of the Ringkampf faction in which he described his character as an "arrogant snob". When paired with Gunther in WWE as Ludwig Kaiser, Barthel often acted as his mouthpiece.

In 2025, Barthel took over the El Grande Americano character from Chad Gable. While Gable's version was seen as a mockery to lucha libre, Barthel's version was praised for the respect to Mexico and lucha libre tradition, introducing Mexican cultural references like singing "Cielito Lindo" during his entrance and being billed from Tangamandapio (in reference to Jaimito from El Chavo del Ocho). Barthel speaks fluent Spanish as El Grande Americano, whereas Gable legitimately did not know Spanish.

== Other media ==
=== Video games ===
Year	Title	Notes	Ref.
2022	WWE 2K22	Video game debut; as Marcel Barthel	
2023	WWE 2K23		
2024	WWE 2K24		
2025	WWE 2K25		
2026	WWE 2K26	As El Grande Americano and Ludwig Kaiser.	

== Luchas de Apuestas record ==
Winner (wager)	Loser (wager)	Location	Event	Date	Notes
El Grande Americano (mask)	"The Original" El Grande Americano (mask)	Monterrey, Nuevo León, Mexico	Noche de Los Grandes	30 May 2026	No Disqualification match

== Personal life ==
Barthel began dating fellow WWE wrestler Tiffany Stratton in May 2022. He is currently dating AAA ring announcer Andrea Bazarte.

On 20 May 2026, Barthel was arrested in Orlando, Florida, on a misdemeanor battery charge following an altercation at his apartment complex. Following his booking into the Orange County Jail, Barthel was released on a $1,000 bond.

== Championships and accomplishments ==
- Catch Wrestling Norddeutschland
  - Tag Team Tournament (2009) – with Da Mack
- European Wrestling Promotion
  - EWP Tag Team Championship (1 time) – with Da Mack
- Great Bear Promotions
  - Great Bear Grand Championship (1 time, final)
- German Stampede Wrestling
  - GSW Tag Team Championship (1 time) – with Da Mack
- Lucha Libre AAA Worldwide
  - AAA Mega Championship (1 time, current)
  - Rey de Reyes (2026)
- Nordic Championship Wrestling
  - NFC First Fighter Championship (1 time)
  - International NCW Cruiserweight Championship (1 time)
  - First Fighter Tournament (2010)
- Pro Wrestling Illustrated
  - Ranked No. 43 of the top singles wrestlers in the PWI 500 in 2026
- Pro Wrestling Fighters
  - PWF North-European Championship (1 time)
- Westside Xtreme Wrestling
  - wXw Unified World Wrestling Championship (1 time)
  - wXw World Tag Team Championship (2 times) – with Da Mack
  - Mitteldeutschland Cup (2014)
  - Four Nations Cup (2015)
- WWE
  - WWE Speed Championship (1 time) (Note: As El Grande Americano. The title was originally won by Chad Gable, who originally portrayed Americano, with Barthel taking over the role and reign on 30 June 2025, due to Gable's injury.)
  - NXT Tag Team Championship (2 times) – with Fabian Aichner

== See also ==
- El Grande Americano
