= AAA Mega Championship =

Professional wrestling championship

AAA Mega Championship (Mega Campeonato AAA)
- The current design of the AAA Mega Championship belt (2026–present)

Details
- Promotion: Lucha Libre AAA Worldwide
- Date established: September 16, 2007
- Current champion: El Grande Americano
- Date won: September 13, 2026

Other names
- AAA Mega Championship (2007–present); AAA World Heavyweight Championship (alternative name; 2007–present); Mexican Heavyweight Championship (name used by TNA; 2011)
Statistics
- First champion: El Mesías
- Most reigns: El Mesías (4 reigns)
- Longest reign: El Hijo del Vikingo (1st reign, 833 days)
- Shortest reign: Jeff Jarrett (2nd reign, 83 days)
- Oldest champion: Dr. Wagner Jr. (52 years, 167 days)
- Youngest champion: El Hijo del Vikingo (24 years, 219 days)
- Heaviest champion: Electroshock (119 kg (262 lb))
- Lightest champion: El Hijo del Vikingo (71 kg (157 lb))

The AAA Mega Championship (often referred to as the AAA World Heavyweight Championship in English and known as the Mega Campeonato AAA in Spanish) is a men's professional wrestling world heavyweight championship promoted by Mexican promotion Lucha Libre AAA Worldwide (AAA), sister promotion of the U.S. based WWE. The current champion is El Grande Americano, who is in his first reign. He won the title by defeating Dominik Mysterio in a No Disqualification match on Night 2 of Triplemanía 34 on September 13, 2026.

== History ==
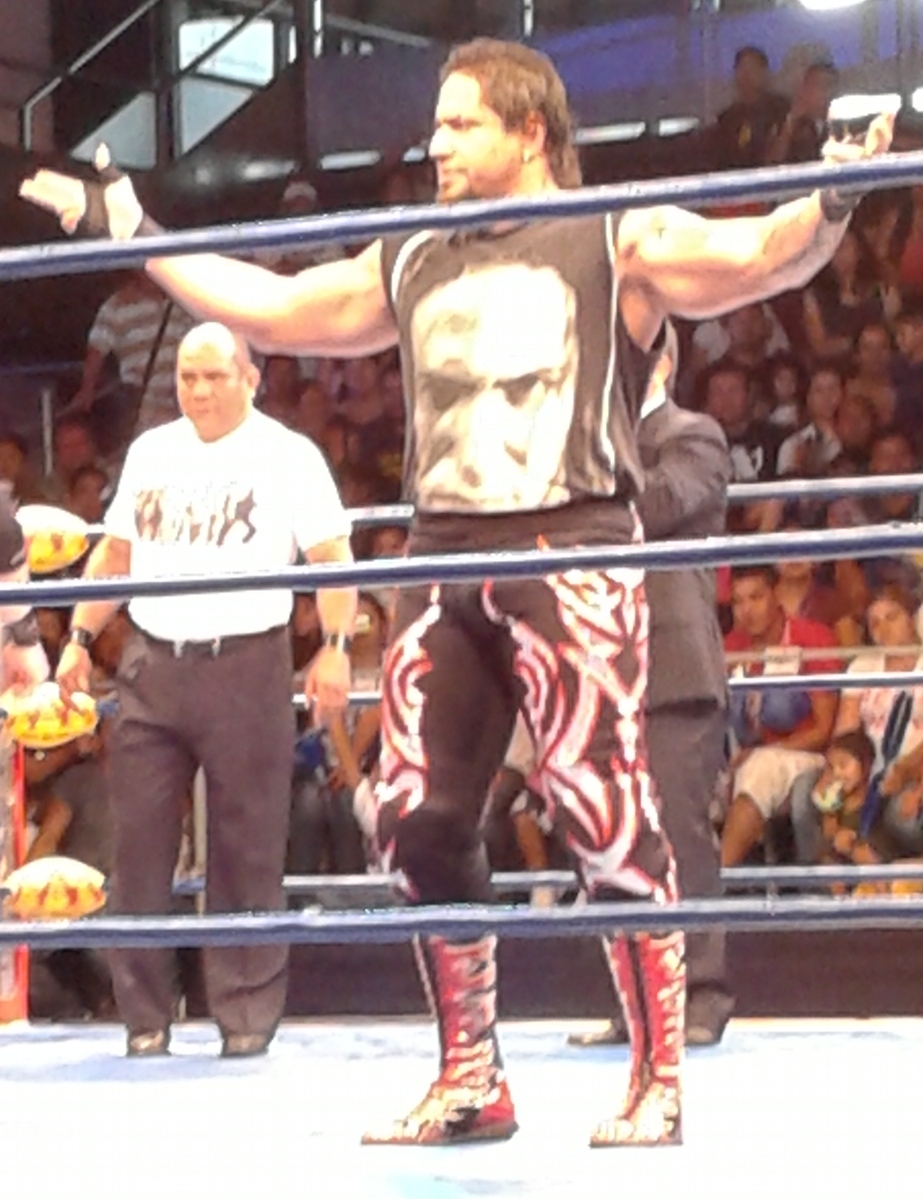
Record four-time and inaugural champion El Mesias

The title was introduced in 2007 via a single elimination tournament billed as the Torneo Campeón De Campeones (Champion of Champions Tournament), which effectively unified the IWC World Heavyweight Championship, Grand Prix Championship Wrestling (GPCW) SUPER-X Monster Championship, Mexican National Heavyweight Championship, and UWA World Light Heavyweight Championship. The tournament field included the four reigning champions of the aforementioned titles and the number one contender to each championship. IWC World Heavyweight Champion El Mesías became the inaugural AAA Mega Champion upon defeating UWA World Light Heavyweight Champion Chessman in the final.

Inaugural Championship Tournament bracket

1st Round; Sin Limite; August 16–19, 2007 (Aired: August 26 – September 2)
El Mesías (c) (Note: IWC World Heavyweight Champion)	Win
La Parka (c) (Note: GPCW SUPER-X Monster Champion)	12:48
Kenzo Suzuki	13:05
Charly Manson (c) (Note: Mexican National Heavyweight Champion)	Win
Cibernético	Win
Mr. Niebla	4:00
Chessman (c)	Win
El Zorro	11:00

Semifinals; Sin Limite; September 13, 2007 (Aired: September 23)
El Mesías (c)	Win
Charly Manson (c)	13:20
Cibernético	— (Note: Cibernético did not compete in the semifinals.)
Chessman (c)	Win

Final; Verano de Escándalo; September 16, 2007 (Aired: October 7)
El Mesías (c)	Disqualification
Chessman (c) (Note: UWA World Light Heavyweight Champion)	19:14

In 2011, AAA Mega Champion and Total Nonstop Action Wrestling (TNA) founder Jeff Jarrett appeared with a redesigned version of the title belt in TNA. Due to Spike TV—TNA's broadcaster—not allowing TNA to refer to AAA by name, a silver hexagonal plate was used to cover the AAA faceplate. The title was referred to as the Mexican Heavyweight Championship. On April 21, 2013, the title was defended outside AAA for the first time at World Wrestling League (WWL) in Puerto Rico. In March 2015, AAA Mega Champion El Patrón Alberto defended the championship in Lucha Underground via AAA's joint ownership of Lucha Underground.

On the May 11, 2026, episode of Raw, the AAA Mega Championship was defended in WWE for the first time as Dominik Mysterio successfully retained the title against "The Original" El Grande Americano.

== Reigns ==
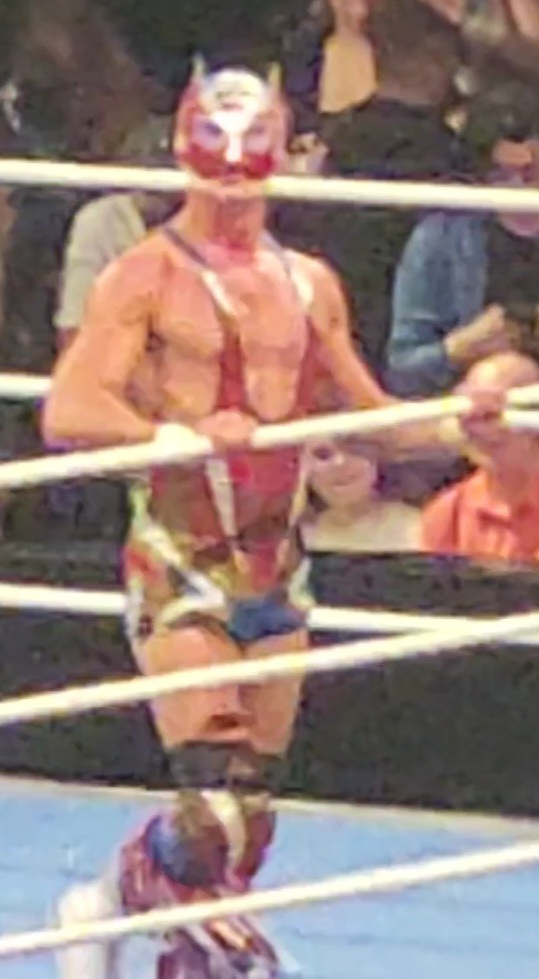
Current champion El Grande Americano

Overall, there have been 24 reigns among 15 champions and four vacancies. The inaugural champion was El Mesías. El Texano Jr.'s first reign gave the title the world status when he defended it in Mexico. El Hijo del Vikingo has the longest reign at 833 days, while Jeff Jarrett has the shortest reign at 83 days. Mesías holds the record for the most reigns with four. Texano Jr., Fénix, Kenny Omega, Vikingo, and Dominik Mysterio are the only wrestlers to have held the title for a full year. Dr. Wagner Jr. is the oldest champion at 52 years and 167 days, while Vikingo is the youngest at 24 years and 219 days.

El Grande Americano is the current champion in his first reign. He won the title by defeating Dominik Mysterio in a No Disqualification match on Night 2 of Triplemanía 34 in Azcapotzalco, Mexico City, Mexico, on September 13, 2026.

Key
No.	Overall reign number
Reign	Reign number for the specific champion
Days	Number of days held
Days recog.	Number of days held recognized by the promotion
+	Current reign is changing daily

No.	Champion	Championship change			Reign statistics			Notes	Ref.
No.	Champion	Date	Event	Location	Reign	Days	Days recog.	Notes	Ref.
Lucha Libre AAA Worldwide (AAA)
1	El Mesías	September 16, 2007	Verano de Escándalo	Guadalajara, Jalisco, Mexico	1	182	175	Defeated Chessman in the tournament final to become the inaugural champion. Aired on October 7.	
2	Cibernético	March 16, 2008	Rey de Reyes	Monterrey, Nuevo León, Mexico	1	222	217	Aired on March 30.	
—	Vacated	October 24, 2008	Antonio Peña Memorial Show	Veracruz, Mexico	—	—	—	Cibernético quit AAA because Konnan took over the promotion. Aired on November 2.	
3	El Mesías	December 6, 2008	Guerra de Titanes	Orizaba, Veracruz, Mexico	2	189	174	Defeated El Zorro in a ladder match to win the vacant title. Aired on December 21.	
4	Dr. Wagner Jr.	June 13, 2009	Triplemanía XVII	Mexico City, Mexico	1	181	197		
5	El Mesías	December 11, 2009	Guerra de Titanes	Ciudad Madero, Tamaulipas, Mexico	3	91	84	Aired on December 27.	
6	Electroshock	March 12, 2010	Rey de Reyes	Querétaro City, Querétaro, Mexico	1	86	77	This three-way match also featured Mr. Anderson. Aired on March 21.	
7	Dr. Wagner Jr.	June 6, 2010	Triplemania XVIII	Mexico City, Mexico	2	182	189		
8	El Zorro	December 5, 2010	Guerra de Titanes	Zapopan, Jalisco, Mexico	1	195	188	Aired on December 12.	
9	Jeff Jarrett	June 18, 2011	Triplemanía XIX	Mexico City, Mexico	1	274	274	Appeared in TNA, calling the title the "Mexican Heavyweight Championship".	
10	El Mesías	March 18, 2012	Rey de Reyes	Zapopan, Jalisco, Mexico	4	259	272		
11	El Texano Jr.	December 2, 2012	Guerra de Titanes	Zapopan, Jalisco, Mexico	1	735	722	Aired on December 15.	
12	El Patrón Alberto	December 7, 2014	Guerra de Titanes	Zapopan, Jalisco, Mexico	1	337	337		
—	Vacated	November 9, 2015	—	—	—	—	—	El Patrón Alberto left AAA for WWE.	
13	El Texano Jr.	March 23, 2016	Rey de Reyes	San Luis Potosí City, San Luis Potosí, Mexico	2	361	351	Defeated El Mesías to win the vacant title. Aired on April 2.	
14	Johnny Mundo	March 19, 2017	Rey de Reyes	Monterrey, Nuevo León, Mexico	1	313	313	This Winner Takes All three-way match for the AAA Mega Championship, AAA Latin American Championship, and AAA World Cruiserweight Championship also featured El Hijo del Fantasma.	
15	Rey Wagner	January 26, 2018	Guerra de Titanes	Mexico City, Mexico	3	128	128	Vampiro was the special guest referee.	
16	Jeff Jarrett	June 3, 2018	Verano de Escándalo	Monterrey, Nuevo León, Mexico	2	83	83	This three-way match also featured Rey Mysterio Jr..	
17	Fénix	August 25, 2018	Triplemanía XXVI	Mexico City, Mexico	1	420	420	This four-way match also featured Brian Cage and Rich Swann.	
18	Kenny Omega	October 19, 2019	Héroes Inmortales XIII	Orizaba, Veracruz, Mexico	1	765	765		
—	Vacated	November 22, 2021	—	—	—	—	—	Omega suffered injuries which prevented him from defending the title at Triplemanía Regia II.	
19	El Hijo del Vikingo	December 4, 2021	Triplemanía Regia II	Monterrey, Mexico	1	833	833	Defeated Samuray del Sol, Jay Lethal, Bobby Fish, and Bandido in a five-way match to win the vacant title.	
—	Vacated	March 16, 2024	—	—	—	—	—	El Hijo del Vikingo sustained an injury.	
20	Nic Nemeth	April 27, 2024	Triplemania XXXII: Monterrey	Monterrey, Mexico	1	112	112	Defeated Alberto El Patrón to win the vacant title.	
21	Alberto El Patrón	August 17, 2024	Triplemania XXXII: Mexico City	Azcapotzalco, Mexico City, Mexico	2	287	287		
22	El Hijo del Vikingo	May 31, 2025	Alianzas	Mexico City, Mexico	2	104	104		
23	Dominik Mysterio	September 12, 2025	Worlds Collide: Las Vegas	Paradise, Nevada, U.S.	1	366	366		
24	El Grande Americano	September 13, 2026	Triplemanía 34; Night 2	Azcapotzalco, Mexico City, Mexico	1	55+	55+	This was a No Disqualification match.	

== Combined reigns ==
As of November 7, 2026

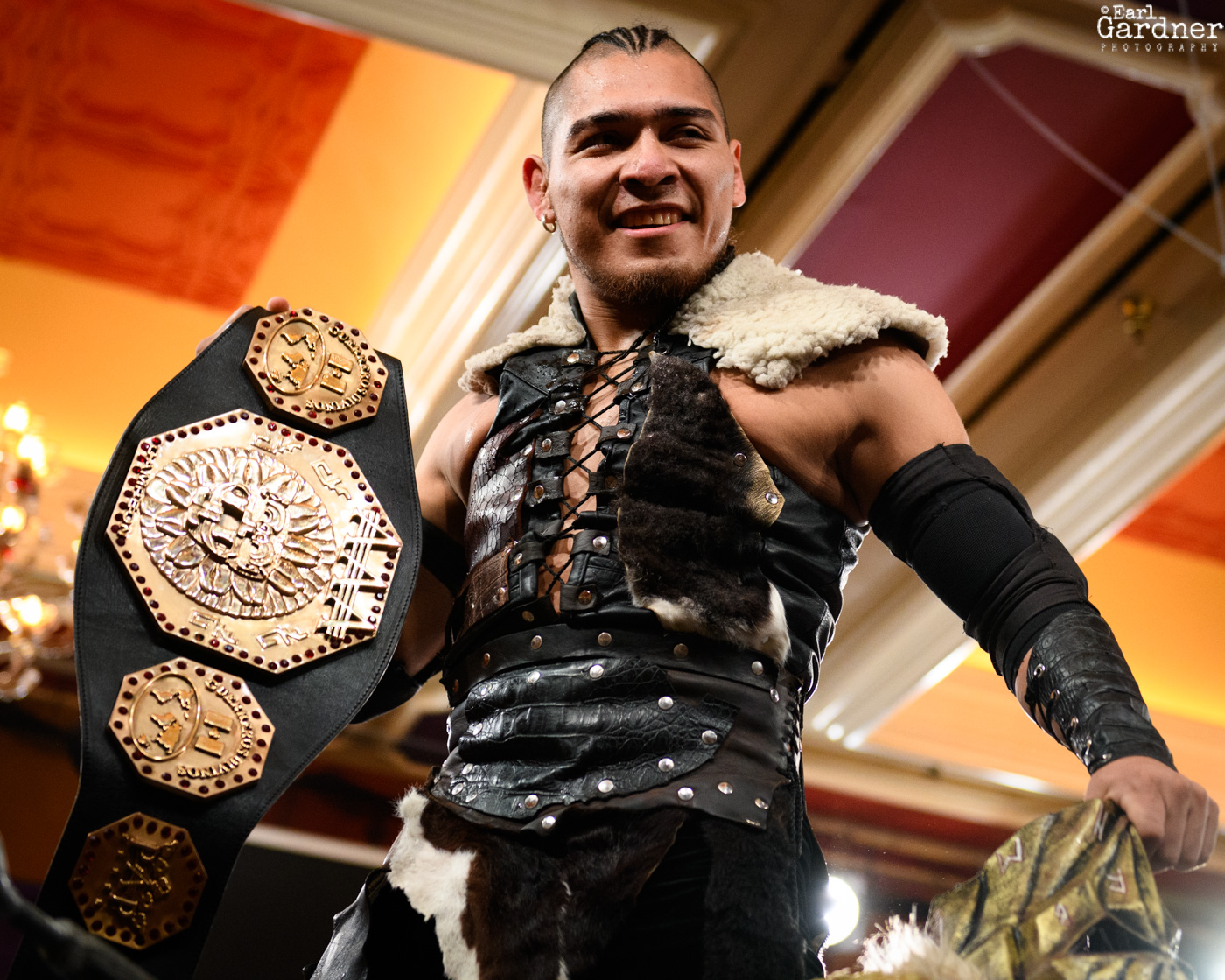
Two-time champion El Hijo del Vikingo held the title the longest at 833 days.

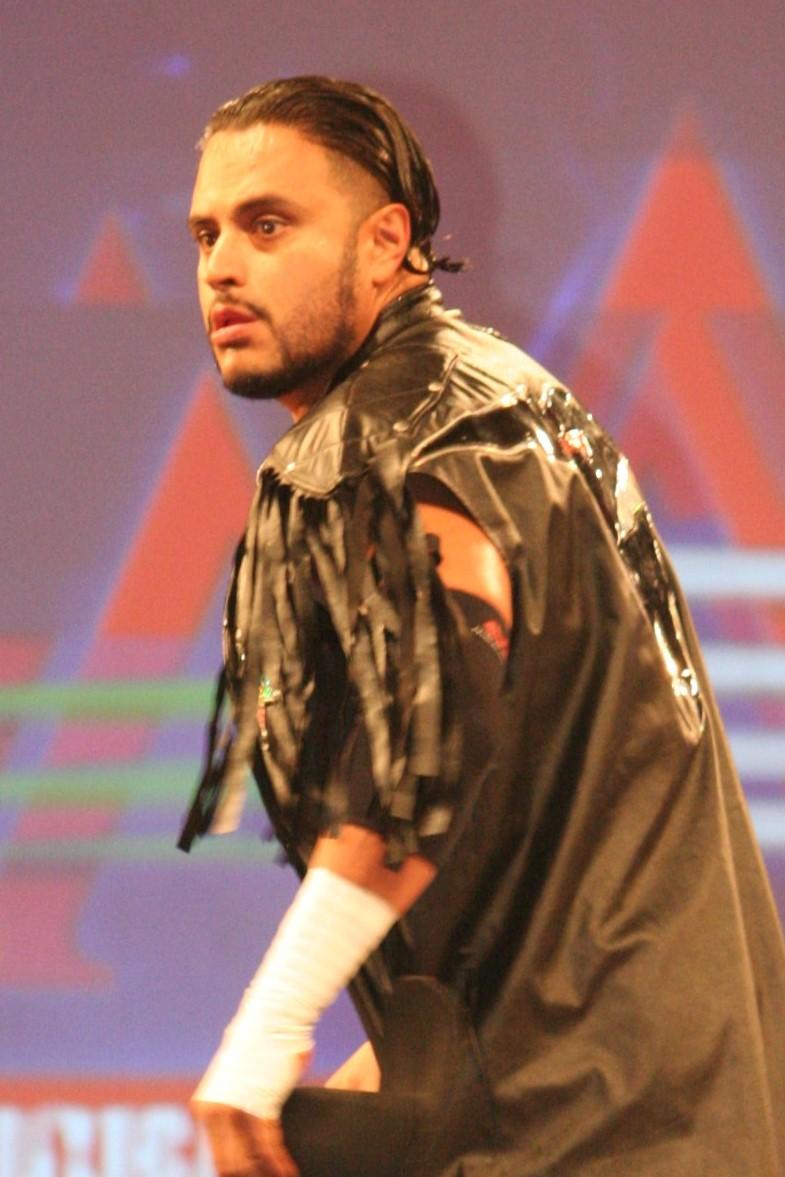
Two-time champion Texano Jr has the longest combined reign at 1096 days.

†	Current champion; reign changing daily

Rank	Champion	No. of reigns	Combined days	
Rank	Champion	No. of reigns	Actual	Recognized by AAA
1	El Texano Jr.	2	1,096	1073
2	El Hijo del Vikingo	2	937	
3	Kenny Omega	1	765	
4	El Mesías	4	721	705
5	Alberto El Patrón / El Patrón Alberto	2	624	
6	Dr. Wagner Jr. / Rey Wagner	3	491	414
7	Fénix	1	420	
8	Dominik Mysterio	1	366	
9	Jeff Jarrett	2	357	
10	Johnny Mundo	1	313	
11	Cibernético	1	222	217
12	El Zorro	1	195	188
13	Nic Nemeth	1	112	
14	Electroshock	1	86	77
15	El Grande Americano †	1	55+	

== See also ==
- List of current champions in Lucha Libre AAA Worldwide
- World championships in WWE
