= NXT In Your House (2022) =

WWE premium live event

- Promotional poster featuring Joe Gacy, Bron Breakker, Mandy Rose, and Wendy Choo
- Promotion: WWE
- Brand: NXT 2.0
- Date: June 4, 2022
- City: Orlando, Florida
- Venue: WWE Performance Center

WWE event chronology
← Previous; WrestleMania Backlash	Next → Hell in a Cell

In Your House chronology
← Previous; NXT TakeOver (2021)	Next → Final

NXT major events chronology
← Previous; Stand & Deliver	Next → Worlds Collide

The 2022 NXT In Your House was a professional wrestling premium live event (PLE) produced by WWE, held for wrestlers from the promotion's developmental brand, NXT 2.0. It was NXT's third annual In Your House and WWE's 30th and final In Your House overall. The event took place on Saturday, June 4, 2022, at NXT's home venue, the WWE Performance Center in Orlando, Florida for a third consecutive year.

In June 2020, WWE revived In Your House as an annual subseries of the NXT TakeOver series. In September 2021, however, the TakeOver series was discontinued after NXT was rebranded as NXT 2.0 and reverted to being WWE's developmental brand. With the scheduling of this 2022 event, In Your House became its own event for NXT, but it would be the final as no further In Your House events were scheduled. Unlike the previous year's event, which also aired on pay-per-view (PPV), the 2022 event was only available via WWE's livestreaming platforms, as WWE ceased broadcasting NXT's events on PPV beginning with Stand & Deliver in April. As a result, this was the first and only In Your House to livestream on Disney+ Hotstar in Indonesia, following the shutdown of its version of the WWE Network in late January. This was subsequently the only In Your House to be branded as a "premium live event", a term the company introduced at the start of the year to refer to its events airing on traditional PPV and via WWE's livestreaming platforms.

Eight matches were contested at the event, including two dark matches that were later streamed on Level Up. All five championships exclusive to the NXT brand were contested; two were lost while the other three were retained. In the main event, Bron Breakker defeated Joe Gacy to retain the NXT Championship. In other prominent matches, The Creed Brothers (Brutus Creed and Julius Creed) defeated Pretty Deadly (Elton Prince and Kit Wilson) to win the NXT Tag Team Championship, Carmelo Hayes defeated Cameron Grimes to win the NXT North American Championship, and in the opening bout, The D'Angelo Family (Tony D'Angelo, Channing "Stacks" Lorenzo, and Troy "Two Dimes" Donovan) defeated Legado Del Fantasma (Santos Escobar, Cruz Del Toro, and Joaquin Wilde).

== Production ==
=== Background ===
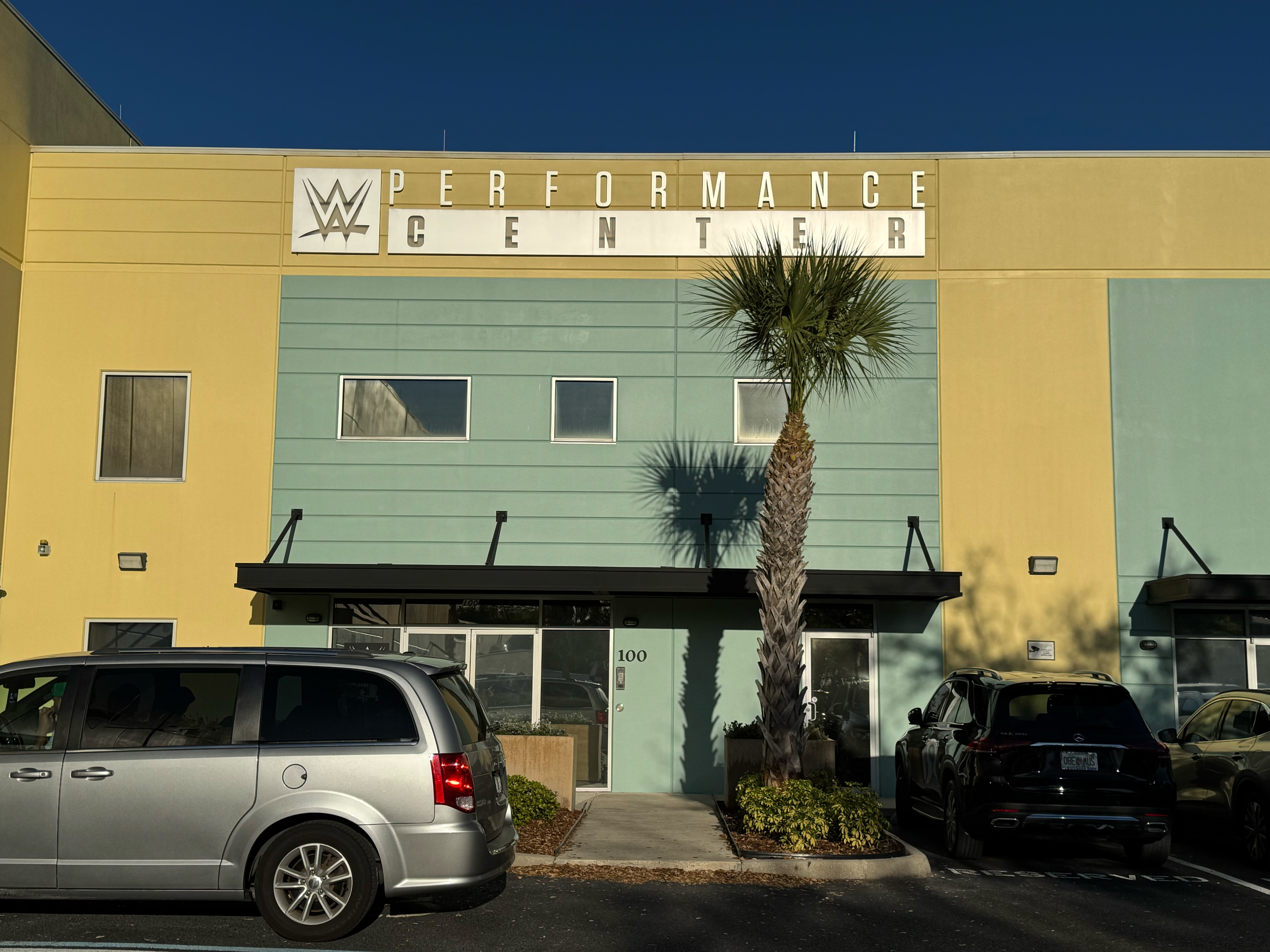
NXT's third annual In Your House, and the 30th and final In Your House overall, was held at NXT's home venue, the WWE Performance Center in Orlando, Florida for a third consecutive year.

In Your House was a series of monthly professional wrestling pay-per-view (PPV) events originally produced by WWE from May 1995 to February 1999. They aired when the promotion was not holding one of its then-five major PPVs at the time (WrestleMania, King of the Ring, SummerSlam, Survivor Series, and Royal Rumble), and were sold at a lower cost. The branding was retired following February 1999's St. Valentine's Day Massacre: In Your House event, as the company moved to install permanent names for each of its monthly PPVs. After 21 years, In Your House was reinstated in 2020 for WWE's NXT brand as a subseries of the NXT TakeOver series, being held annually in June. In September 2021, however, the TakeOver series was discontinued after NXT was rebranded as NXT 2.0, reverting to a developmental brand for WWE.

Despite TakeOver's discontinuation, on April 29, 2022, a third In Your House for NXT, and 30th In Your House overall, was scheduled to be held on Saturday, June 4, 2022, at NXT's home venue, the WWE Performance Center in Orlando, Florida for a third consecutive year. This was also the first In Your House to be branded as a "premium live event", a term the company introduced on January 1 to refer to its events that are available on PPV and via livestreaming.

=== Broadcast outlets ===
Unlike the previous year, which also aired on traditional PPV, the 2022 event was only available on WWE's livestreaming platforms as the company ceased broadcasting NXT's events on PPV beginning with Stand & Deliver in April. It was available on Peacock in the United States, SonyLIV in India, Disney+ Hotstar in Indonesia, and the WWE Network everywhere else. This was the first In Your House to livestream on Disney+ Hotstar in Indonesia, following the shutdown of its version of the WWE Network in late January.

=== Storylines ===
Other on-screen personnel
Role:	Name:
Commentators	Vic Joseph
Commentators	Wade Barrett
Spanish commentators	Marcelo Rodríguez
Spanish commentators	Jerry Soto
Ring announcer	Alicia Taylor
Referees	Adrian Butler
Referees	Felix Fernandez
Referees	Joey Gonzalez
Referees	Marquis Hamilton
Referees	Dallas Irvin
Referees	Danilo Anfibio
Referees	Derek Sanders
Pre-show panel	Sam Roberts
Pre-show panel	McKenzie Mitchell

The card included matches that resulted from scripted storylines. Results were predetermined by WWE's writers on the NXT brand, while storylines were produced on WWE's weekly television program, NXT 2.0, and the supplementary online streaming show, Level Up.

At NXT: Spring Breakin' on May 3, Bron Breakker defeated Joe Gacy to retain the NXT Championship. After the show ended, Breakker was attacked by hooded minions under the command of Gacy before being carried out of the building on a stretcher by the henchmen. The following week, Gacy offered an invitation to Breakker to join his movement. On the May 17 episode of NXT, Breakker declined. Gacy then offered Breakker a rematch for the title, adding the stipulation that Breakker would lose the title if he was disqualified due to him not being able to control his anger, making the match official for In Your House.

During the NXT Stand & Deliver Kickoff pre-show, Wendy Choo cost Toxic Attraction (Gigi Dolin and Jacy Jayne) the NXT Women's Tag Team Championship. However, on the following episode of NXT, Dolin and Jayne won back the title, due to NXT Women's Champion and Toxic Attraction leader Mandy Rose preventing interference from Choo. In the coming weeks, Choo kept targeting the stable, including an unsuccessful attempt at winning the NXT Women's Tag Team Championship. On the May 24 episode of NXT, after Choo attacked Rose after the latter's match, Rose accepted Choo's challenge for an NXT Women's Championship match, which was scheduled for In Your House in a Women's Championship Summit the next week.

At NXT Stand & Deliver, Carmelo Hayes lost the NXT North American Championship to Cameron Grimes in a five-way ladder match. At NXT: Spring Breakin', Hayes failed to win the title in a triple threat match also involving Solo Sikoa, who Grimes pinned to retain the title. On the following episode of NXT, Sikoa wanted another shot at the title, and Grimes said that he would get the match after Grimes defeated Hayes at In Your House. The next day, a match between Grimes and Hayes for the title was made official for In Your House.

On May 15, Pretty Deadly (Kit Wilson and Elton Prince) were scheduled to defend the NXT Tag Team Championship against The Creed Brothers (Brutus Creed and Julius Creed) at In Your House. Wilson and Prince last eliminated The Creed Brothers in a gauntlet match to win the vacant title on the April 12 episode of NXT. On the May 31 episode, a further stipulation was added in that The Creed Brothers must leave Diamond Mine should they lose.

In April, Legado Del Fantasma (Santos Escobar, Cruz Del Toro, Elektra Lopez, and Joaquin Wilde) began feuding with Tony D'Angelo, the self-proclaimed "Don of NXT", and his "family". On the April 26 episode of NXT, D'Angelo revealed his associates to be Channing "Stacks" Lorenzo and Troy "Two Dimes" Donovan, after they cost D'Angelo his match. At NXT: Spring Breakin', D'Angelo and Escobar agreed to an uneasy truce. The following week, Escobar stated that AJ Galante was fair game in the war due to his interference in the peace talks. D'Angelo responded by kidnapping Toro in his car trunk and leaving the Performance Center. A match between Escobar and D'Angelo was scheduled for the May 17 episode. During the match, a brawl between Toro, Wilde, Lorenzo, and Donovan occurred at ringside, which allowed Escobar to strike D'Angelo with brass knuckles and give Escobar the win. The following week, after Donovan and Lorenzo's match, the two teams brawled. On the May 31 episode, the two teams agreed to a six-man tag team match at In Your House where the losing team would join the winning team's stable.

== Reception ==
Matthew McFarlin of Slam Wrestling reviewed the event and gave it 4 out of 5 stars, saying: "In terms of results, NXT got everything right tonight. There's a select group of guys like the Creed Brothers and Bron Breakker who are naturally over with the Orlando faithful, and they're cashing in. I think the matches themselves overstayed their welcomes, but overall, In Your House was pretty solid." Kevin Berge of Bleacher Report called the men's NXT Tag Title bout the "best match of the night" for having "stakes and emotion" in their story and praised the men's NXT Championship match for showcasing Breakker and Gacy's "obvious chemistry" and the stronger conclusion elevating them. He was critical of both women's bouts, noting the NXT Tag Title match had a "rushed pace" and anticlimatic finish, and felt that Choo-Rose was merely an "okay defense" with sloppy action and lacking in drama throughout the contest. Berge added that: "[T]his show had potential, but it was far more down than up, with multiple matches not delivering."

Thomas Hall of 411Mania gave praise to both the six-man tag team opener and the men's NXT Tag Title bout, felt that both women's title bouts were "only so good" and "not an awful match" respectively, and critiqued that the NXT Championship match "wasn't awful, but it also didn't feel like a big main event." He gave the event a 7 out of 10, concluding that: "[T]he show was pretty good for the most part with nothing bad, but to say this is a downgrade from the almost always incredible Takeover series would be the understatement of the year. There is nothing on here that you really need to see and it felt like an extended version of the TV show rather than anything special." Kevin Pantoja, also writing for 411Mania, called the six-man tag team match a "fun opener boosted by a hot crowd", praised the North American and men's NXT Tag Title matches, called the women's NXT Tag Title bout "a really fun tag", saw Choo-Rose as fine despite the former's gimmick and felt the NXT Championship main event "told a fine enough story but a lot of it was boring." He also gave the event a 7 out of 10, calling it: "An enjoyable show that, at less than two and a half hours, is easy to recommend. It's good even with the weak ending though it's clear that this wasn't anything special. It would've worked better as a special episode of the weekly show rather than as a Peacock special."

== Aftermath ==
New NXT North American Champion Carmelo Hayes, with Trick Williams, opened the following episode of NXT, but was quickly interrupted by Solo Sikoa, who wanted a shot at the title. Grayson Waller interrupted, stating that nobody liked Sikoa, which is why they called him "Solo". Waller, Hayes, and Williams then laid out Sikoa, leading to a 2-on-1 handicap match pitting Sikoa against Waller and Hayes being scheduled for that episode's main event. However, after making his NXT return earlier that night, Apollo Crews teamed with Sikoa to defeat Waller and Hayes.

With Legado Del Fantasma (Santos Escobar, Cruz Del Toro, Joaquin Wilde, and Elektra Lopez) joining The D'Angelo Family (Tony D'Angelo, Channing "Stacks" Lorenzo, and Troy "Two Dimes" Donovan), they would accompany each other during matches with them usually losing. On the following episode of NXT, Escobar lost his match after he didn't want to use his crowbar against his opponent. On the June 21 episode (taped June 8), Escobar cost D'Angelo his NXT North American Championship match. This was Donovan's final WWE appearance, as he was released on June 12 due to a policy violation. On the June 28 episode, he was written off television when D'Angelo threw him off the bridge and into the water. D'Angelo thought that Donovan tried to steal his throne. At NXT: The Great American Bash on July 5, D'Angelo revealed that Escobar was hospitalized and the other members of Legado began working with The D'Angelo Family. Escobar returned on the August 2 episode of NXT, where he cost Lorenzo and D'Angelo their NXT Tag Team Championship match, signaling that their alliance had ended. A street fight between D'Angelo and Escobar was later scheduled for Heatwave, where D'Angelo won to end the feud and, as per the match stipulation, Escobar and the rest of Legado agreed to leave NXT if that happened.

This would be the final In Your House as another event was not scheduled for 2023.

== Results ==
No.	Results	Stipulations	Times
1^{D}	Valentina Feroz (with Yulisa León) defeated Arianna Grace by pinfall	Singles match	4:15
2^{D}	Ikemen Jiro defeated Dante Chen by pinfall	Singles match	7:01
3	The D'Angelo Family (Tony D'Angelo, Channing "Stacks" Lorenzo, and Troy "Two Dimes" Donovan) defeated Legado del Fantasma (Santos Escobar, Cruz Del Toro, and Joaquin Wilde) (with Elektra Lopez) by pinfall	Six-man tag team match Losing team joined the winning team's stable.	12:45
4	Toxic Attraction (Gigi Dolin and Jacy Jayne) (c) defeated Katana Chance and Kayden Carter by pinfall	Tag team match for the NXT Women's Tag Team Championship	9:01
5	Carmelo Hayes (with Trick Williams) defeated Cameron Grimes (c) by pinfall	Singles match for the NXT North American Championship	15:30
6	Mandy Rose (c) defeated Wendy Choo by pinfall	Singles match for the NXT Women's Championship	11:08
7	The Creed Brothers (Brutus Creed and Julius Creed) defeated Pretty Deadly (Elton Prince and Kit Wilson) (c) by pinfall	Tag team match for the NXT Tag Team Championship; Had The Creed Brothers lost, they would have had to leave Diamond Mine.	15:19
8	Bron Breakker (c) defeated Joe Gacy by pinfall	Singles match for the NXT Championship; Had Breakker gotten disqualified, he would have lost the championship.	15:50
(c) / – the champion(s) heading into the match; D / – this was a dark match
