= Angel Garza =

Mexican professional wrestler (born 1992)

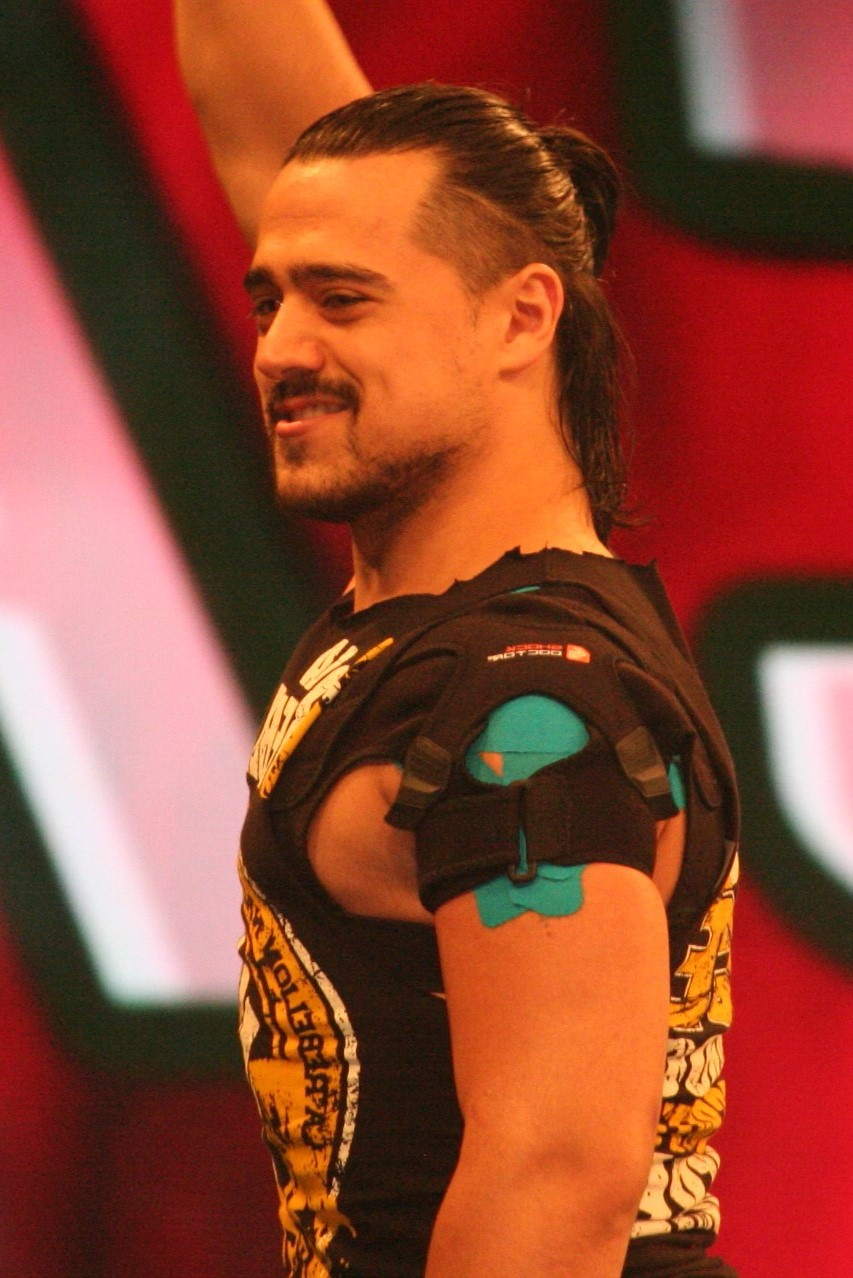
- Angel in 2017

Personal information
- Born: Humberto Garza Solano; September 23, 1992 (age 33) Monterrey, Nuevo León, Mexico
- Spouse: Zaide Lozano (m. 2020)
- Children: 2
- Relatives: Héctor Garza (uncle); Humberto Carrillo (cousin)
- Family: Garza

Professional wrestling career
- Ring name(s): Angel; Angel Garza; El Hijo del Ninja; Humberto Garza; Garza Jr.
- Billed height: 1.75 m (5 ft 9 in)
- Billed weight: 93 kg (205 lb)
- Billed from: Monterrey, Mexico
- Trained by: Arturo Beristain; Mario Segura
- Debut: November 4, 2008

Humberto Garza Solano (born September 23, 1992) is a Mexican professional wrestler. He is signed to WWE, where he performs on the Raw brand under the ring name Angel (shortened from his previous ring name Angel Garza). He also appears in Lucha Libre AAA Worldwide as a member of Los Perros del Mal where he is one-third of the AAA World Trios Champions with stablemates Daga and Berto in their first reign both as a stable and individually.

He is a third-generation wrestler, the grandson of luchador Mario Segura, known as El Ninja. From his debut in 2008 until 2015, Garza worked under the ring name El Hijo del Ninja ("The Son of the Ninja"). He is the nephew of Héctor Garza and Humberto Garza Jr. and the grand-nephew of Humberto Segura Garza. He is the cousin of fellow WWE wrestler Humberto Carrillo, who was his tag team partner in Mexico and currently is in WWE. Garza originally worked as an enmascarado, or masked wrestler, but voluntarily unmasked in 2012 in the series finale of a dating reality show and has worked unmasked ever since.

As Garza Jr., he previously worked for Impact Wrestling in the United States, for Lucha Libre AAA Worldwide, and on the Mexican independent circuit for a number of promotions including The Crash Lucha Libre. Garza Jr., along with Penta el 0M, Rey Fénix and Daga formed La Rebelión on the independent circuit after leaving Lucha Libre AAA Worldwide. He signed with WWE in 2019 and was assigned to the NXT brand, wrestling as Angel Garza where he was a one-time NXT Cruiserweight Champion and a one-time WWE 24/7 Champion.

== Early life ==
Humberto Garza Solano was born on September 23, 1992, in Monterrey, Nuevo León, Mexico. He is the grandson of professional wrestler Mike Segura, also known as El Ninja. Garza was named after his great-uncle, professional wrestler Humberto Garza (real name Humberto Segura Garza). He is the nephew of professional wrestlers Humberto Garza Jr., Héctor Garza, and El Ninja Jr. Two of his cousins are also professional wrestlers, Humberto Carrillo (son of Humberto Garza Jr.) and El Sultán (son of Héctor Garza).

== Professional wrestling career ==
=== Early career (2008–2015) ===
Garza was trained by his grandfather Mario Segura as well as El Hijo del Gladiador prior to his lucha libre debut on November 8, 2008, using the ring name El Hijo del Ninja ("The Son of the Ninja"), an enmascarado, or masked wrestling character. Initially he worked for Federacion Internacional de Lucha Libre (FILL) as they promoted shows in his native Monterrey, Nuevo León. On August 25, 2009, El Hijo del Ninja won the 2009 Copa Arena Coliseo Monterrey defeating Pee-Wee, Kaientai, Angel Dorada Jr. and Hombre Sin Miedo in succession to win the cup. He followed up his tournament victory by winning the FILL Light Heavyweight Championship that same year. He would win his first Lucha de Apuestas, or "bet match", on September 30, 2009, when he defeated Black Morse, forcing him to unmask as a result of the stipulation. A Lucha de Apuestas win is generally considered a bigger achievement than a championship victory and is an indicator of a promotional "push". He would close out the year in another Lucha de Apuestas match, this time a Relevos Suicida where he teamed up with Silver Star to face the team of Memo Valles and Coco Viper. Since both El Hijo del Ninja and Memo Valles were pinned in the match the two were forced to wrestle each other risking El Hijo del Ninja's mask and Memo Valles hair. With the victory El Hijo del Ninja forced Memo Valles to have all his hair shaved off. In 2010 he won another Lucha de Apuestas, forcing Estrella Dorada Jr. to have all his hair shaved off. In 2011 El Hijo del Ninja won the FILL Rey del Aire ("King of the Air") tournament.

By the late fall of 2011 a new promotion began holding shows in Monterrey, Llaves y Candados (LyC), taking over running shows in Arena Coliseo Monterrey. On September 18 of that year El Hijo del Ninja won the LyC Championship. He would later give up the championship as the promotion abandoned it. In 2012 El Hijo del Ninja participated in a Mexican dating reality TV show called Mitad y Mitad: Lucha por el Amor ("Half and Half: Fight for Love"), where he voluntarily unmasked in the show finale, taking the El Hijo del Ninja mask off on national television to publicly show his face for the first time during his professional wrestling career. From that point on he would wrestle without a mask. The TV show appearance led to a feud with local celebrity/wrestler Konan Big, a storyline feud that led to a Lucha de Apuestas match between the two. It was originally scheduled to be a one-on-one match where El Hijo del Ninja "bet" his hair while Konan Big "bet" his wife on the outcome of the match. During the lead up to the match itself both Silencio and Konan Big's show, El Hijo de Konan Big got involved, turning it into a four-way steel cage match. Silencio was the first wrestler to leave the cage, followed by Konan Big. In the end El Hijo del Ninja managed to escape the cage, forcing El Hijo de Konan Big to have all his hair shaved off.

In 2014 some Mexican wrestling media sources reported that Total Nonstop Action Wrestling (TNA) was interested in signing El Hijo del Ninja to a contract, but nothing substantial came of the rumors at the time. In 2015 El Hijo del Ninja and his cousin Último Ninja won the LyC Tag Team championship, only to lose them to the team of lucha libre legends Dr. Wagner Jr. and Silver King, as part of an ongoing storyline feud between the Garza family and La Dinastia Wagner. The storyline led to a six-man steel cage match where El Hijo del Ninja, El Ninja Jr. and Último Ninja took on Dr. Wagner Jr. El Hijo del Dr. Wagner Jr. and Silver King Jr., with the last man in the cage being forced to unmask. In the end El Hijo del Ninja was the last man to escape the cage, while Silver King Jr. was left in the ring and thus had to unmask as a result. During the spring of 2016 Garza Jr. was invited to the WWE Performance Center in Orlando, Florida as part of WWE's research for their upcoming Cruiserweight Classic, but ended up not participating in the tournament. On August 13, 2016, the Garza cousins defeated Tony Casanova and Zarco to win The Crash Tag Team Championship on a show in Tijuana, Baja California.

=== Lucha Libre AAA Worldwide (2015–2017) ===
Garza began working for Lucha Libre AAA Worldwide (AAA), one of Mexico's largest wrestling promotions, in 2015 where was introduced under the ring name "Garza Jr.", abandoning the "El Hijo del Ninja" moniker from that point on. His first AAA match was at Héroes Inmortales IX held on October 4, 2015. He was introduced as "Garza Jr." for the first time, adopting both the ring gear and mannerisms resembling his uncle Héctor. Garza Jr. teamed up with Psycho Clown and Rey Mysterio Jr. to defeat the trio of Myzteziz, El Texano Jr. and El Hijo del Fantasma in the semi-main event of the show. Garza Jr. teamed up with La Parka and Electroshock to compete for the vacant AAA World Trios Championship at the 2016 Guerra de Titanes show. The match also was a three-way match that included the trio of El Hijo de Pirata Morgan, Hijo del Fantasma and Taurus and the winning trio of Dark Cuervo, Dark Scoria and El Zorro. Garza Jr. failed to qualify for the finals of the 2016 Rey de Reyes tournament as he was eliminated by Blue Demon Jr. In April 2016 Garza Jr. was defeated by El Texano Jr. and thus was not able to qualify for the 2016 Lucha Libre World Cup. Garza Jr. was teamed up with El Hijo del Fantasma for a four-way AAA World Tag Team Championship match at Triplemanía XXIV against champions Los Güeros del Cielo (Angélico and Jack Evans), Drago and Aero Star, Paul London and Matt Cross. In the end Drago and Aero Star won the match and the championship. After several mid-card matches Garza Jr. competed in the main event of Héroes Inmortales X, just over a year after his AAA debut. Garza Jr. unsuccessfully challenged Johnny Mundo for the AAA Latin American Championship in a match that was originally scheduled to be lower on the card but was moved to the main event on the night of the show. Three months later Garza Jr. was involved in another featured match, this time at the 2017 Guerra de Titanes show, where he fought, and lost to El Hijo del Fantasma in a match where the AAA World Cruiserweight Championship was on the line.

=== Mexican independent circuit (2017–2019) ===
On January 21, 2017, the day after Guerra de Titanes, Garza Jr. left AAA and made a surprise appearance at a "The Crash" show in Tijuana, Baja California alongside Daga and Pentagón Jr. who also left AAA. The trio was joined by Rey Fénix, stating that they were now independent of AAA and were forming a group. Later that night Garza Jr. teamed up with Daga to compete in a five-team match against Pentagón Jr./Rey Fénix, Matt Hardy/Jeff Hardy, Bestia 666/Nicho El Millonario and Juventud Guerrera/Super Crazy that was won by Pentagón Jr. and Rey Fénix. On the same night it was announced that The Crash Tag Team Championship was vacant, stripping Garza Jr. and Último Ninja of the championship to allow the Broken Hardys to win the championship in the main event of the show by defeating Juventud Guerrera and Super Crazy. In subsequent interviews Garza stated that AAA prevented him from earning more money; when promoters across Mexico inquired if Garza Jr. would be available to wrestle on their shows AAA often told the promoters that Garza Jr. was already booked, only to not give him work on those dates themselves. The group of Penta, Rey Fénix, Daga and Garza Jr. later announced that they would not be using the Perros del Mal name for the group, like Pentagón Jr. and Daga had used in AAA but instead come up with a new name for the group. The group was named La Rebelión and would later include El Zorro and Rey Mysterio Jr..

=== Impact Wrestling (2017–2018) ===
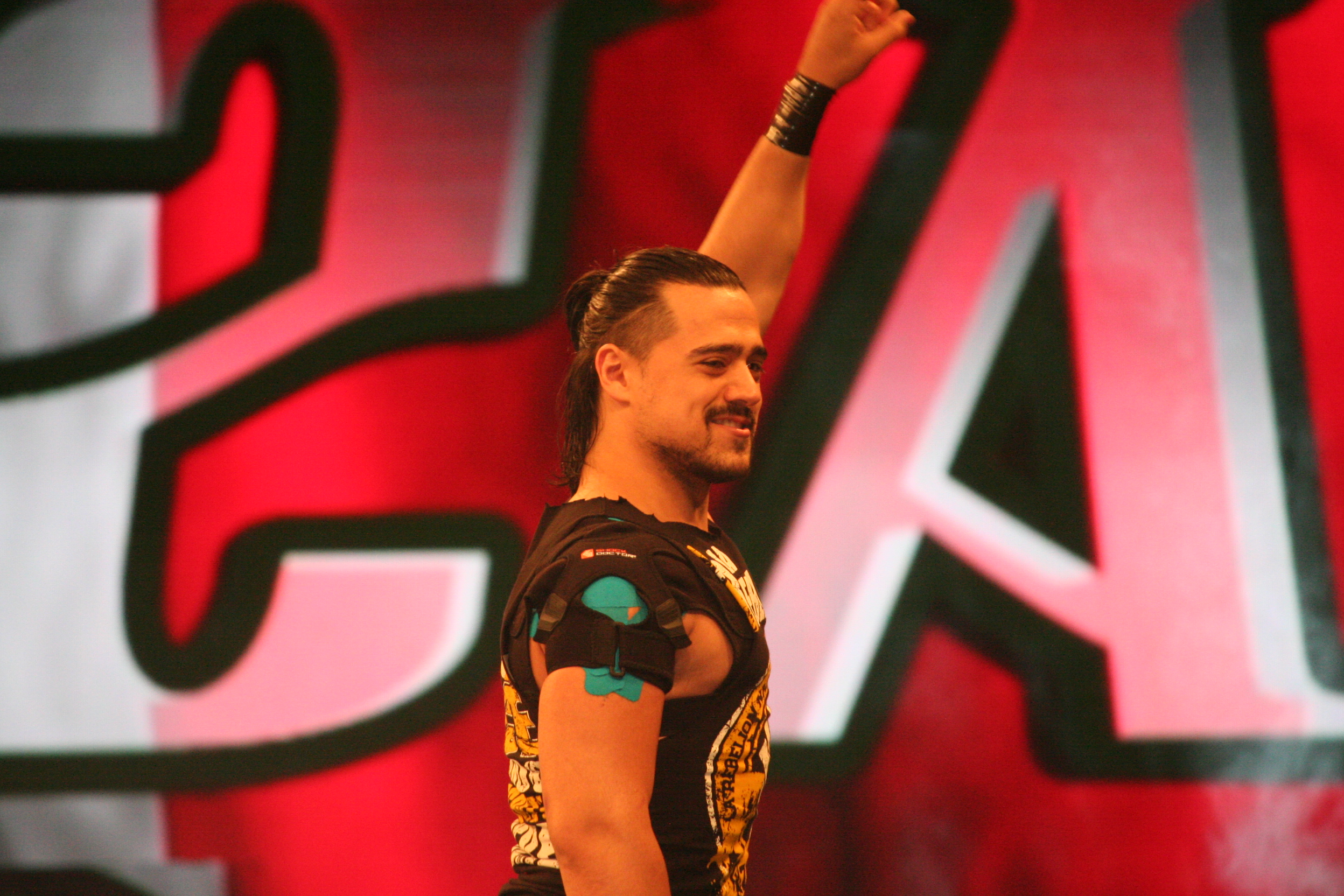
Garza Jr. at the 2017 Bound for Glory

Garza Jr., alongside Mexican wrestler Laredo Kid, made his surprise debut for the Orlando, Florida-based Impact Wrestling at their TV show taping on March 2, 2017. The two made their in-ring debut by defeating Eli Drake and Tyrus. Two days later Garza Jr. and Laredo Kid participated in a four-team match for the Impact World Tag Team Championship, against The Latin American Xchange, Decay and Reno SCUM, which was won by LAX represented by Santana and Ortiz. At Slammiversary XV, Garza Jr. and Laredo Kid competed in a four-way tag team match for the Impact World and GFW Tag Team Championships, which was won by The Latin American Xchange. At Bound for Glory, Garza Jr. competed in a six-way match for the Impact X Division Championship, which was won by Trevor Lee. Garza Jr. wrestled his final match for the company on January 11, 2018, and left after his contract has expired.

=== WWE (2019–present) ===
==== NXT Cruiserweight Champion (2019–2020) ====
On April 18, 2019, it was announced that he signed a contract with WWE and begun working at their Performance Center, and his ring name was changed to Angel Garza. In June, it was announced that Garza will compete in a tournament named NXT Breakout Tournament, where he made his debut on the June 26 episode of NXT as a heel, defeating Joaquin Wilde in the first round of the tournament, but losing to A. C. H. in the semifinals on July 24 episode of NXT. On the August 20 episode of 205 Live, Garza debuted on the brand while cementing his heel turn, competing on Drew Gulak's team in a ten–man tag team match against Oney Lorcan's team, where Lorcan's team was victorious.

On the November 6 episode of NXT, Garza defeated Tony Nese to become the number one contender for the NXT Cruiserweight Championship against Lio Rush, but Garza failed to defeat Rush the following week on NXT. On the December 11 episode of NXT, Garza defeated Rush to win the NXT Cruiserweight Championship, his first title in the WWE. On January 25, 2020, at Worlds Collide, Garza lost the title to Jordan Devlin in a fatal four-way match, also involving Travis Banks and Isaiah "Swerve" Scott, who Devlin pinned. On the February 5 episode of NXT, after defeating Isaiah "Swerve" Scott, he called out Jordan Devlin, wanting a rematch as Devlin did not pin Garza to win the title. The following week on NXT, Garza was defeated by Lio Rush in a number one contender's match for the NXT Cruiserweight Championship.

==== Teaming with Andrade (2020–2021) ====
On the February 3 episode of Raw, Garza made his debut on the Raw brand as a heel associate of Zelina Vega and opposed his cousin Humberto Carrillo, viciously assaulting Carrillo until the latter was rescued by Rey Mysterio. Garza subsequently faced Mysterio, where Garza lost via disqualification, after performing a DDT to Mysterio on the concrete floor. Garza was scheduled to team with Vega's other associate, Andrade to face The Street Profits (Angelo Dawkins and Montez Ford) for the Raw Tag Team Championship at WrestleMania 36, but Andrade was removed from that match due to an injury and was replaced by Austin Theory, who is another associate of Vega. At WrestleMania, Garza and Theory were unsuccessful at capturing the titles. On the April 13 episode of Raw, Garza, Andrade and Theory attacked Akira Tozawa as all three posed together, confirming their status as a faction. However, on the May 18 episode of Raw they kicked Theory out of their faction for accidentally costing them a match against Kevin Owens and Apollo Crews. The following week on Raw, Garza defeated Kevin Owens in an upset victory. On the June 8 episode of Raw, Garza competed in a Triple Threat match against Andrade and Owens for an opportunity at the United States Championship at Backlash but was pinned by Andrade. During the match, Andrade and Garza accidentally knocked out Vega after getting in to an argument. At Backlash, Garza attempted to help Andrade defeat Crews but was stunned by Owens at ringside which led to Crews retaining the title. The following night on Raw, Garza lost to Owens after Andrade's interference on Garza's behalf backfired.

On the June 22 episode of Raw, Garza and Andrade attacked the Street Profits after their match with The Viking Raiders making their intentions known for the Raw Tag Team Titles. Over the next few weeks, Garza and Andrade would feud with The Viking Raiders defeating them in a Tag Team Elimination match but struggled to get on the same page as a tag team. Andrade and Garza would start to coexist as a tag team as they defeated The Viking Raiders and Cedric Alexander and Ricochet to earn a Raw Tag Team Title shot against Street Profits at SummerSlam. At the event they were defeated by the Street Profits after a miscommunication between Garza and Andrade. On the September 14 episode of Raw, Vega ended her association with Garza and Andrade having had enough of them constantly arguing and fighting with each other. The following week on Raw, Garza and Andrade (without Vega) defeated Seth Rollins and Murphy and Dominik Mysterio and Humberto Carrillo to once again become #1 Contenders for the Raw Tag Team Titles against the Street Profits at Clash of Champions. At the event they were once again unsuccessful at capturing the titles as Garza suffered a legitimate knee injury during the match thus causing an unexpected quick finish to the match, the following day Dave Meltzer reported that despite the botched ending The Street Profits were originally scheduled to Win the match and that plans did not change because of the legitimate injury.

Garza returned on the October 12 episode of Raw, defeating Andrade, thus officially splitting up the team. On December 31, 2020, Garza won his first WWE 24/7 Championship from R-Truth during a New Year's Eve party that was streamed live on TikTok. However, on the January 4, 2021, episode of Raw, The Boogeyman appeared and scared him, thus pinned by R-Truth to retain the 24/7 Championship title. On the May 3 edition of Raw, Gulak confronted Garza which lead to a match, which Garza won. After the match Garza shoved a rose down Gulak's pants and then kicked it.

==== Los Garza (2021–present) ====
In the following months, Garza would occasionally be seen backstage pursuing the 24/7 Championship. On the September 20 episode of Raw, Garza formed a tag team with his cousin Humberto Carrillo, defeating Mansoor and Mustafa Ali. As part of the 2021 Draft, both Garza and Carrillo were drafted to the SmackDown brand. On the November 5 episode of SmackDown, the team was named Los Lotharios, with both Garza and Carrillo shortening their ring names, being billed as Angel and Humberto.

As part of the 2023 WWE Draft, Angel and Humberto was drafted to the Raw brand. Angel and Humberto returned on the June 13, 2023, episode of NXT, laying out Axiom and Scrypts. Later in the show, they were interviewed and said that they wanted to join the competition in the NXT tag division as Malik Blade and Edris Enofe, Josh Briggs and Brooks Jensen, and Hank Walker and Tank Ledger brawled in the ring. On July 11, his ring name was reverted to Angel Garza. At NXT No Mercy, Los Lotharios failed to win the NXT Tag Team Championship in a fatal four-way tag team match. Los Lotharios returned to the main roster on the December 22 episode of SmackDown as masked men to assist Santos Escobar defeat Bobby Lashley in the United States Championship #1 Contender Tournament semifinals, aligning with Escobar in the process and changing their tag team name to Los Garza. On the January 19, 2024, episode of SmackDown, the newly revived Legado Del Fantasma defeated Latino World Order's Carlito, Joaquin Wilde and Cruz Del Toro in a six-man tag team match.

On June 15, 2025, Los Garza defeated Nueva Generación Dinamita (Sansón and Forastero), The Nemeth Brothers (Nic Nemeth and Ryan Nemeth), and Psycho Clown and Pagano to win the AAA World Tag Team Championship at Triplemanía Regia III. This also marked Angel's return to AAA, which was acquired by WWE in April 2025. Los Garza lost the titles on August 16 at Triplemanía XXXIII to Pagano and Psycho Clown in a Street Fight, ending their reign at 62 days. On April 24, Santos Escobar departed WWE, leaving Los Garza as a tag team.

On the June 20 episode of Lucha Libre AAA, Los Garza returned as members of the revival of Los Perros del Mal with Daga, Bronco Nima, and Karmen Petrovic. All members came to the ring and attacked El Grande Americano.

== Other media ==
Garza made his video game debut as a playable character in WWE 2K22 and later appeared in WWE 2K23, WWE 2K24, WWE 2K25, and WWE 2K26.

== Personal life ==
On December 11, 2019, immediately after winning the NXT Cruiserweight Championship, Garza proposed to sports journalist Zaide Lozano in the middle of the ring. They got married on July 23, 2020. Lozano gave birth to a daughter in July 2022. and another daughter in February 2025.

=== Solano/Segura family tree ===
† = deceased

Humberto Garza †	Unidentified Garza	Mario Segura	Unidentified Garza
Héctor Garza †	Humberto Garza Jr.	Unidentified	Ninja Jr.	Máscara Púrpura
El Sultán	Humberto Carrillo	Angel Garza

== Championships and accomplishments ==
- Federación Internacional de Lucha Libre
  - FILL Light Heavyweight Championship (1 time)
  - FILL Rey del Aire Tournament (2011)
  - Copa Arena Coliseo Monterrey (2009)
- Impact Wrestling
  - Gravy Train Turkey Trot (2017) – with Eddie Edwards, Allie, Richard Justice, and Fallah Bahh
- Llaves y Candados
  - LyC Championship (1 time)
  - LyC Tag Team Championship (1 time) – with Último Ninja
- Lucha Libre AAA Worldwide
  - AAA World Tag Team Championship (1 time) – with Berto
  - AAA World Trios Championship (1 time, current) – with Berto and Daga
- Pro Wrestling Illustrated
  - Ranked No. 109 of the top 500 singles wrestlers in the PWI 500 in 2020
- Pro Wrestling Blitz
  - PWB Tag Team Championship (1 time) – with Laredo Kid
- The Crash Lucha Libre
  - The Crash Tag Team Championship (1 time) – with Último Ninja
- WWE
  - NXT Cruiserweight Championship (1 time)
  - WWE 24/7 Championship (1 time)

== Luchas de Apuestas record ==
Winner (wager)	Loser (wager)	Location	Event	Date	Notes
El Hijo del Ninja (mask)	Black Morse (mask)	Monterrey, Nuevo León	FILL Show	September 13, 2009	
El Hijo del Ninja (mask)	Memo Valles (hair)	Monterrey, Nuevo León	FILL Show	November 3, 2009	(Note: Relevos Suicida, El Hijo del Ninja and Silver Star faced Memo Valles and Coco Viper, with Hijo del Ninja and Valles losing the falls and had to wrestle each other.)
El Hijo del Ninja (mask)	Estrella Dorada Jr. (hair)	Monterrey, Nuevo León	FILL Show	September 26, 2010	
El Hijo del Ninja (hair)	El Hijo de Konan Big (hair)	Monterrey, Nuevo León	LyC Show	December 16, 2012	(Note: Final two wrestlers in a steel cage match that also included Konan Big and Silencio.)
Draw	El Hijo del Ninja/Cipriano (hair)	Monterrey, Nuevo León	LyC Show	April 29, 2013	(Note: Both wrestlers had their hair shaved off as a result of the draw.)
Garza Jr. (hair)	Silver King Jr. (mask)	Monterrey, Nuevo León	Coliseomanía III	October 11, 2015	(Note: Last two men in a steel cage match that also included Dr. Wagner Jr., El Hijo del Dr. Wagner Jr., El Ninja Jr. and Último Ninja.)
Garza Jr. (hair)	Samurai VIP (hair)	Ciudad Juárez, Chihuahua	Live event	July 16, 2017	
Bestia 666 (hair)	Garza Jr. (hair)	Tijuana, Baja California	The Crash VII Aniversario	November 3, 2018	
