= NXT TakeOver: In Your House (2021) =

WWE pay-per-view and livestreaming event

- Promotional poster featuring various NXT wrestlers
- Promotion: WWE
- Brand: NXT
- Date: June 13, 2021
- City: Orlando, Florida
- Venue: Capitol Wrestling Center at WWE Performance Center

WWE event chronology
| ← Previous; WrestleMania Backlash | Next → Hell in a Cell |

NXT TakeOver chronology
| ← Previous; Stand & Deliver | Next → 36 |

In Your House chronology
| ← Previous; NXT TakeOver (2020) | Next → 2022 |

The 2021 NXT TakeOver: In Your House was a professional wrestling pay-per-view (PPV) and livestreaming event produced by WWE, held exclusively for wrestlers from the promotion's NXT brand division. It was simultaneously the 35th NXT TakeOver event, NXT's second annual In Your House, and WWE's 29th In Your House overall. The event took place on June 13, 2021, from the Capitol Wrestling Center, a bio-secure bubble that was hosted at the WWE Performance Center in Orlando, Florida, but with nearly all COVID-19 pandemic protocols lifted and the virtual audience removed to allow an increased live audience capacity.

This was the first In Your House to livestream on SonyLIV in India and Peacock in the United States following the shutdown of the Indian version of the WWE Network in February and the American version in April, as well as the first to air on traditional PPV since St. Valentine's Day Massacre: In Your House in February 1999; the previous TakeOver: In Your House only aired on the WWE Network worldwide. The TakeOver series was discontinued with NXT's rebranding to NXT 2.0 in September, but one further In Your House was held for NXT in June 2022. This was also the last In Your House event to air on traditional PPV, as WWE ceased broadcasting NXT's major events on PPV following WarGames in December.

Six matches were contested at the event, including one dark match. In the main event, Karrion Kross defeated Kyle O'Reilly, Adam Cole, Johnny Gargano, and Pete Dunne in a fatal five-way match by technical submission to retain the NXT Championship. In the penultimate match, Raquel González defeated Ember Moon to retain the NXT Women's Championship. Other prominent matches included LA Knight defeating Cameron Grimes in a ladder match for the vacant Million Dollar Championship and in the opening bout, NXT North American Champion Bronson Reed and NXT Tag Team Champions MSK (Nash Carter and Wes Lee) defeated Legado del Fantasma (Santos Escobar, Joaquin Wilde, and Raul Mendoza) in a Winner Takes All Six-man Tag Team match to retain both of their respective championships.

== Production ==
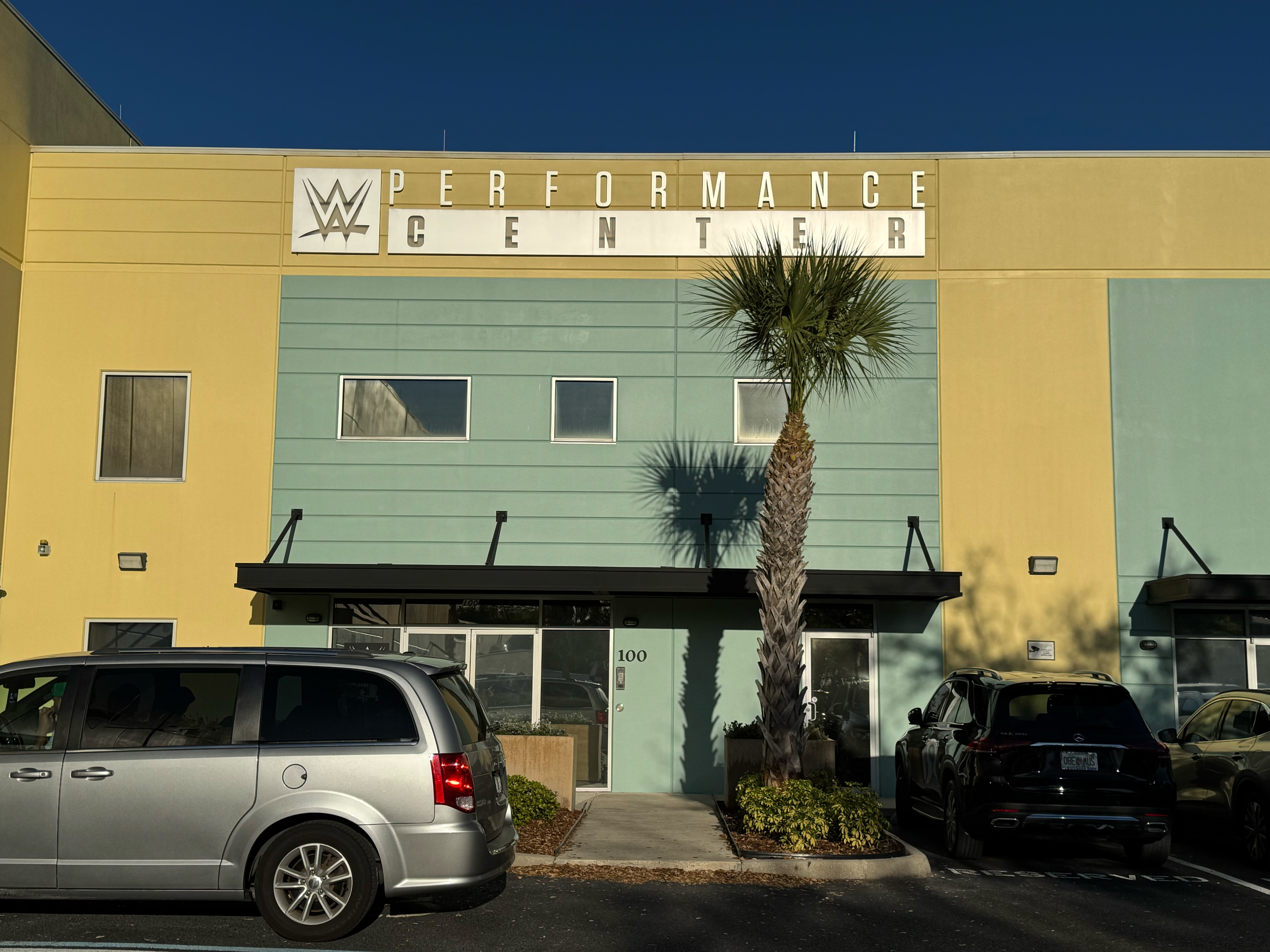
Due to the COVID-19 pandemic, the 35th NXT TakeOver event, which was NXT's second annual In Your House and 29th In Your House overall, was produced by way of a bio-secure bubble called the Capitol Wrestling Center, which was hosted at the WWE Performance Center in Orlando, Florida.

=== Background ===
TakeOver was a series of professional wrestling events that began in May 2014, as WWE's NXT brand held its second WWE Network-exclusive livestreaming event, billed as TakeOver. The "TakeOver" moniker subsequently became the branding for all of NXT's major events held periodically throughout the year. While originally exclusive to the WWE Network, TakeOver events also became available on traditional pay-per-view (PPV) beginning with TakeOver 31 in October 2020, and then also on SonyLIV in India and Peacock in the United States following the shutdown of the Indian version of the WWE Network in February and the American version in April.

In June 2020, NXT held TakeOver: In Your House, reinstating In Your House after 21 years, which was previously a series of monthly PPV events that was held by WWE from May 1995 to February 1999. On May 13, 2021, a second TakeOver: In Your House, subsequently being the 35th TakeOver event and 29th In Your House, was scheduled for June 13, 2021. This established In Your House as an annual June event for NXT and marked the first In Your House to air on traditional PPV since St. Valentine's Day Massacre: In Your House in February 1999, as well as the first In Your House to livestream on Peacock and SonyLIV—the 2020 event only aired on the WWE Network.

==== Impact of the COVID-19 pandemic ====
As a result of the COVID-19 pandemic that began affecting the industry in mid-March 2020, WWE had to present the majority of its programming from a behind closed doors set. NXT's programming was initially held at NXT's home venue at the time, Full Sail University in Winter Park, Florida. In October 2020, NXT's events were moved to a bio-secure bubble called the Capitol Wrestling Center, which was hosted at the WWE Performance Center in Orlando, Florida. Like the WWE ThunderDome utilized for Raw and SmackDown's programming, LED boards were placed around the Performance Center so that fans could attend virtually, while additionally and unlike the ThunderDome, friends and family members of the wrestlers were in attendance along with a limited number of actual live fans divided from each other by plexiglass walls.

For TakeOver: Stand & Deliver in April 2021, the plexiglass walls were removed, and live audience capacity was increased. In Your House increased capacity further to nearly 300 spectators, being the largest attended NXT event at the Capitol Wrestling Center. Nearly all COVID-19 protocols were lifted including physical distancing requirements and the requirement to wear masks although anyone who had tested positive, within the preceding 14 days, were asked to stay home. The virtual audience was also removed with the increased live audience capacity.

=== Storylines ===
The event included matches that resulted from scripted storylines. Results were predetermined by WWE's writers on the NXT brand, while storylines were produced on WWE's weekly television program, NXT.

A triple threat match between Kyle O'Reilly, Pete Dunne, and Johnny Gargano was scheduled on the June 1 episode of NXT to determine who would face Karrion Kross for the NXT Championship at TakeOver: In Your House. The match ended in a no-contest after Adam Cole interfered and attacked all three competitors. Kross would confront Cole and made a request to NXT General Manager William Regal to defend the title against Cole, O'Reilly, Dunne, and Gargano. Regal agreed to Kross's request and made the bout a fatal five-way match for the title at the event.

NXT Women's Champion Raquel González viciously assaulted Shotzi Blackheart while Ember Moon was forced to watch the ordeal after being subdued by Dakota Kai, following the conclusion of the women's tag team match between the team of Blackheart and Moon and the team of Kai and González on the May 25 episode of NXT. The following week, Moon called out González and they both brawled in the ring. Later that same night, Moon announced that she would challenge González for the NXT Women's Championship at TakeOver: In Your House, which was made official.

On the May 25 episode of NXT, Mercedes Martinez defeated Zayda Ramier. Afterwards that day, the lights went out and turned back on with a red lighting, and Mei Ying of Tian Sha appeared on the LED screen. As things went back to normal Martinez was given a black symbol on the back of her wrist. The following week, Xia Li was with Boa watching a video of her first round loss against Martinez in the inaugural Mae Young Classic from 2017, saying it was a disgrace to her family and she would hurt her at TakeOver: In Your House. Later that night, Martinez said that she was aware of Li being different, after facing her in the Mae Young Classic, and that she was not afraid of Li and would defeat her at TakeOver.

On the February 10 episode of NXT, Cameron Grimes made his return from injury and claimed to have become a GameStop investor during his time away (in reference to the GameStop stock rise), thus making him the "richest man in NXT". Grimes then began a feud with WWE Hall of Famer and "The Million Dollar Man", Ted DiBiase, after encountering him in a jewelry store over their watches. Over the next few weeks, DiBiase would continue to one-up Grimes, outbidding him in various purchases. On the May 25 episode of NXT, LA Knight confronted Grimes during the Million Dollar Face-Off segment between Grimes and DiBiase, the latter of whom Knight defended and allied with. The following week, it was announced that a singles match between Grimes and Knight was scheduled for TakeOver: In Your House. DiBiase later announced that their match would instead be a ladder match for the revived Million Dollar Championship.

On the June 1 episode of NXT, MSK (Nash Carter and Wes Lee) successfully defended the NXT Tag Team Championship against Legado Del Fantasma (Joaquin Wilde and Raul Mendoza), after an assist from NXT North American Champion Bronson Reed, who took down Santos Escobar during the match. The following week, Escobar proposed a winners take all match for the NXT North American Championship and NXT Tag Team Championships at TakeOver: In Your House, which Reed and MSK accepted.

== Event ==
Other on-screen personnel
| Role: | Name: |
|---|---|
| Host | Todd Pettengill |
| Commentators | Vic Joseph |
| Commentators | Wade Barrett |
| Commentators | Beth Phoenix |
| Spanish commentators | Carlos Cabrera |
| Spanish commentators | Marcelo Rodríguez |
| Ring announcer | Alicia Taylor |
| Referees | Darryl Sharma |
| Referees | D.A. Brewer |
| Referees | Eddie Orengo |
| Referees | Aja Smith |
| Referees | Chris Sharpe |
| Interviewer | McKenzie Mitchell |
| Pre-show panel | Sam Roberts |
| Pre-show panel | Justin Barrasso |
| Pre-show panel | Arash Markazi |

=== Dark match ===
Before the event aired live on pay-per-view and on WWE's livestreaming platforms, a dark match took place which saw Sarray and Zoey Stark take on The Robert Stone Brand (Aliyah and Jessi Kamea) (accompanied by Robert Stone). The climax came when Sarray dropkicked Aliyah into Stone. Afterwards, Stark performed a Z360 on Aliyah to win the match.

=== Preliminary matches ===
The actual event opened with NXT North American Champion Bronson Reed and NXT Tag Team Champions MSK (Wes Lee and Nash Carter) facing off against Legado del Fantasma (Santos Escobar, Joaquin Wilde, and Raul Mendoza) in a Winner Takes All Six-man Tag Team match. During the match, Wilde and Mendoza performed a High-Low on Lee for a nearfall, before Carter broke it up. Escobar performed a Michinoku Driver on Reed for a nearfall. In the climax, after Reed tackled Escobar against one of the plexiglass walls, MSK performed their elevated corkscrew blockbuster on Mendoza, followed by Reed performing the "Tsunami" on Mendoza to retain their respective championships.

Next, Xia Li (accompanied by Boa) faced Mercedes Martinez. In the end, Li performed a roundhouse kick to Martinez's head to win the match. Following the pinfall, Martinez attacked both Li and Boa with a steel chair sending them out of the ring. As the duo retreated up the entrance ramp, Mei Ying, who watched and walked on stage, took Martinez down. As Martinez attempted to attack Ying, Ying applied a choke hold to immobilize Martinez, throwing her off the ramp into a guardrail.

In a backstage segment, Johnny Gargano and Kyle O'Reilly, two of the five participants in the main event match, were shown brawling in the arena parking lot.

After that, LA Knight faced Cameron Grimes in a ladder match for the Million Dollar Championship. Ted DiBiase watched the match at ringside — this was a back-and-forth match. During the match, Grimes retrieved the gold-plated ladder that DiBiase had used to introduce the match (which was on the stage). As Grimes ascended the ladder, Knight prevented Grimes from retrieving the Championship by tipping the ladder over. In the closing moments, Grimes attempted to ascend the ladder again, only for Knight to send Grimes off the ladder, through another ladder which was positioned outside the ring. Knight then ascended and retrieved the championship to win the match. Following the match, DiBiase awarded the championship to Knight.

In the fourth match, Raquel González (accompanied by Dakota Kai) defended the NXT Women's Championship against Ember Moon. During the match, Moon performed her "Eclipse" on González, only for Kai to place González's foot on the bottom rope to void the pin. This prompted Moon's tag team partner Shotzi Blackheart, who was not seen on NXT due to injury, to come out and brawl with Kai to the backstage area. González then performed the "Chingona Bomb" on Moon to retain the championship. Later, Kai and Blackheart were shown still brawling in the backstage area.

=== Main event ===
In the main event, Karrion Kross (accompanied by Scarlett) defended the NXT Championship against Johnny Gargano, Pete Dunne, Kyle O'Reilly, and Adam Cole in a fatal five-way match. During the match, Dunne, Gargano, O'Reilly, and Cole attempted to take out Kross, however Kross dispatched all the challengers. Dunne and Gargano threw Kross into the house door of the In Your House set at the top of the stage, temporarily taking Kross out. Kross later returned, however O'Reilly and Cole performed a powerbomb on Kross onto the announcer's table, which did not break. Dunne performed the "Bitter End" on Kross for a nearfall, Gargano performed a "One Final Beat" on Dunne, and Cole performed a "Panama City Sunrise" on Gargano. In the closing moments, O'Reilly performed a top-rope knee drop on Kross, but Cole broke up the pin with a "Superkick". Cole then performed a "Superkick" on Dunne before performing another on Gargano. Cole attempted the Last Shot, but O'Reilly avoided it and applied the "Heel Hook". Moments later, Kross recovered and applied the "Kross Jacket" on O'Reilly, who passed out, to retain the title.

Following the match, NXT general manager William Regal, who looked sullen, told an interviewer that in view of the wild brawls, he was unable to keep order in NXT anymore and mused that it was time for a change.

== Reception ==
TakeOver: In Your House generally received positive reviews from critics. Wrestling journalist Dave Meltzer awarded 4 stars to the six-man tag team match, 2.25 stars to the Xia Li/Mercedes Martinez match, 3.75 stars to the ladder match, 3 stars to the women's championship match, and 4.25 stars to the main event. The event as a whole received a 7.5 "Good" rating from Kevin Pantoja of 411Mania. Sean Ross Sapp of Fightful gave each match generally positive ratings as well, with the main event receiving the highest score at 8.5/10 and the Li/Martinez match the lowest at 5.75/10.

== Aftermath ==
William Regal opened the June 15 episode of NXT by talking about his history with the brand, tearfully recounting the many roles he had had with NXT since 2014. As he was about to reach a conclusion, he was interrupted by NXT Champion Karrion Kross, who gloated about his victory at TakeOver and mockingly inviting Regal to leave. Samoa Joe then made his return to NXT (and to WWE as a whole, having been released from his contract two months prior). Regal revealed that he planned to make Joe the new general manager of NXT, and then formally extended the offer. Joe declined, but made a counteroffer to become Regal's enforcer if Regal stayed in the role. Regal said he would accept on two conditions — that Joe would not be an active in-ring competitor and that he could not physically engage anyone unless provoked. Joe agreed, and began filling the role in segments throughout that night. At the end of the show, he and Regal shook hands on a successful night one of their partnership, with Joe stating it would be "night one of many."

During TakeOver, The Great American Bash was scheduled for July 6 as a special episode of NXT. During the June 15 episode of NXT, continuing on from their encounter at TakeOver, as well as their past feud, Kyle O'Reilly and Adam Cole were signed for a match at The Great American Bash.

Also during the following episode of NXT, LA Knight was formally presented with the Million Dollar Championship by Ted DiBiase. After an emotional promo where he thanked DiBiase for being a fixture of his childhood and called receiving the championship from him the honor of his career, Knight turned on and attacked DiBiase (who was saved by Cameron Grimes). In a video uploaded to WWE's YouTube channel, it was shown that Grimes had apologized to DiBiase following the match at TakeOver. A title rematch was eventually scheduled for The Great American Bash under the stipulation that if Grimes lost, he would become Knight's butler.

The Santos Escobar-Bronson Reed and Xia Li-Mercedes Martinez feuds both continued in promos, with Escobar promising to face Reed for the NXT North American Championship one-on-one in the future. However, Reed lost the title to Isaiah "Swerve" Scott on the June 29 episode of NXT and was later released. Also on the June 29 episode, Li teamed with Boa to defeat Martinez and Jake Atlas.

In September 2021, NXT was rebranded as NXT 2.0, returning the brand to its original function as WWE's developmental brand. The NXT TakeOver series was subsequently discontinued, but one further In Your House was held for NXT in June 2022. This was also the last In Your House event to air on traditional PPV, as WWE ceased broadcasting NXT's major events on PPV after WarGames in December.

== Results ==
| No. | Results | Stipulations | Times |
|---|---|---|---|
| 1^{D} | Sarray and Zoey Stark defeated The Robert Stone Brand (Aliyah and Jessi Kamea) (with Robert Stone) by pinfall | Tag team match | 7:40 |
| 2 | Bronson Reed (North American) and MSK (Nash Carter and Wes Lee) (Tag Team) defeated Legado Del Fantasma (Santos Escobar, Joaquin Wilde, and Raul Mendoza) by pinfall | Winner Takes All Six-man Tag Team match for both the NXT North American Championship and NXT Tag Team Championship | 13:40 |
| 3 | Xia Li (with Boa and Mei Ying) defeated Mercedes Martinez by pinfall | Singles match | 7:40 |
| 4 | LA Knight defeated Cameron Grimes | Ladder match for the vacant Million Dollar Championship | 19:30 |
| 5 | Raquel González (c) (with Dakota Kai) defeated Ember Moon by pinfall | Singles match for the NXT Women's Championship | 12:40 |
| 6 | Karrion Kross (c) (with Scarlett) defeated Kyle O'Reilly, Adam Cole, Johnny Gargano, and Pete Dunne by technical submission | Fatal five-way match for the NXT Championship | 26:15 |
(c) / – the champion(s) heading into the match; D / – this was a dark match
