= Latino World Order =

Professional wrestling stable

- The LWO logos used by WWE since 2023; the left version reflects the Mexican flag, while the right version reflects the Puerto Rican flag

Stable
- Name: Latino World Order
- Leader: Rey Mysterio (II)
- Members: Cruz Del Toro; Joaquin Wilde; Dragon Lee
- Billed from: Streets of Los Angeles (WCW/WWE)
- Former members: See below
- Debut: October 5, 1998 (WCW); March 31, 2023 (WWE)
- Disbanded: January 11, 1999 (WCW)
- Years active: 1998–1999 (WCW); 2023–present (WWE)

The Latino World Order (abbreviated lWo or LWO) is a professional wrestling stable primarily consisting of wrestlers with Latin American backgrounds performing in WWE on the Raw brand. The stable consists of second leader Rey Mysterio, Cruz Del Toro, Joaquin Wilde, (Note: Wilde, who is of Filipino descent, is the only non-Latin American member of the group.) and Dragon Lee. Mysterio is a former one-time WWE United States Champion and Lee is a former one-time WWE Speed Champion and one-time World Tag Team Champion (along with AJ Styles) as part of the stable.

Originally performing in World Championship Wrestling (WCW) from 1998 to 1999, the group was led by Eddie Guerrero. In 2023, it was revived in WWE by new leader Rey Mysterio, who is the only wrestler to be a member of both versions of the group.

The group's name, created by American actor Jason Hervey during his time working backstage as a producer with WCW, is a parody of the New World Order (nWo) stable.

== History ==
=== World Championship Wrestling (1998–1999) ===
The LWO was formed in late 1998 after Eddie Guerrero's spat with World Championship Wrestling (WCW) head Eric Bischoff in a real-life conflict that was turned into a storyline. The group was the idea of Jason Hervey, an actor and friend of Bischoff who was working in a creative position in WCW. The stable was originally supposed to revolve around Konnan, but it was given to Guerrero after Konnan joined the nWo Wolfpac.

On August 17, Guerrero cut a shoot interview, where he claimed to want out of his WCW contract. After being taken off television for several weeks, Guerrero returned on the October 5 edition of Monday Nitro, forming the LWO with several other Mexican wrestlers. The group consisted of the majority of the Mexican roster, as well as Guerrero's friend Art Flores, who played the role of a bodyguard named Spyder.

The group consisted of almost every major Mexican wrestler on the WCW roster including Psychosis, La Parka, Hector Garza, and Juventud Guerrera. Their main feud lay with Rey Mysterio Jr., after he refused to join the group. They also feuded with Billy Kidman, Mysterio's on-and-off American tag team partner. Mysterio was forced to become a member after losing a match to Eddie Guerrero. Chavo Guerrero Jr., Eddie's nephew, wasn't included in the stable as he was deemed "mentally unstable" by the group and rejected as a member.

A car accident suffered by Guerrero on January 1, 1999 would help bring a premature end to the LWO. Three days later, the two factions of the New World Order reunited, and before long, various members of the LWO were found lying unconscious backstage. The nWo approached the LWO and demanded they immediately disband or face further consequences. The next week, Ric Flair also asked the LWO to disband and fight for WCW, promising he would treat them better than Bischoff did and also promising them money, women and limousines. Every member except Mysterio agreed, removing their LWO shirts and exiting the ring. Mysterio, who was not originally a willing member of the group, proved himself the most loyal when he refused to remove his LWO colors. The nWo beat him down and forcibly tore off his LWO shirt, leading to a feud between Mysterio and The Outsiders.

The reunited nWo also betrayed their only Latino member, Konnan, who objected to the brutality used against Mysterio, leading them to form a team against The Outsiders. As Eddie Guerrero healed and made his in-ring return, he and Mysterio formed a popular new group, which included Konnan, known as the Filthy Animals.

=== WWE (2023–present) ===
==== Revival, feuds with The Judgment Day and others (2023) ====
In 2001, the World Wrestling Federation (renamed to WWE in 2002) acquired certain assets and television footage of WCW, including the LWO trademarks. Rey Mysterio, who was contracted under its parent AOL Time Warner, would not join the company until later in 2002. Over 20 years later on the March 31, 2023, episode of SmackDown, Rey, who was set to be inducted into the WWE Hall of Fame Class of 2023 later that night, and was scheduled to wrestle his son, Dominik Mysterio, at WrestleMania 39 that weekend, revived the LWO and invited Legado Del Fantasma (Santos Escobar, Joaquin Wilde, Cruz Del Toro, and Zelina Vega) to join LWO as the group had aided Rey in his fight against The Judgment Day (Dominik Mysterio, Finn Bálor, Damian Priest, and Rhea Ripley) for several weeks prior.

On Night 1 of WrestleMania 39, Escobar, Wilde, Del Toro, and Bad Bunny assisted Rey in his match against Dominik, who was assisted by Bálor and Priest. Rey went on to win his match against Dominik and celebrated with his wife, Angie, and his daughter, Aalyah, in the ring. Afterwards, Zelina Vega confronted night 1’s musical performer Becky G backstage in order to make her an honorary member of the LWO. On the April 7 episode of SmackDown, the LWO lost their first match as a team with Rey and Escobar losing to The Judgment Day's Dominik and Priest. The LWO earned their first victory on the April 24 episode of Raw with Rey defeating Priest by disqualification when Priest threw a steel chair at Rey. The LWO also debut a new entrance music, which paid tribute to the original founder and leader of the stable, Eddie Guerrero. On the May 5 episode of SmackDown, Bad Bunny helped the LWO save Rey from an attack from The Judgment Day, leading to Mysterio giving Bunny an LWO shirt.. On the following night at Backlash, Vega failed to win the SmackDown Women's Championship from Ripley and Bad Bunny defeated Priest with the assistance of Savio Vega and Carlito.

Vega defeated Lacey Evans to qualify for the 2023 women's Money in the Bank ladder match on the June 2 episode of SmackDown whereas Escobar defeated Mustafa Ali to qualify for the 2023 men's Money in the Bank ladder match on the June 9 episode of SmackDown. However, Vega and Escobar failed to win their respective Money in the Bank ladder matches in the namesake event. Escobar and Rey then faced each other in the United States Championship Invitational tournament finals on the July 28 episode of SmackDown, where Escobar went on to face Austin Theory for the title after Rey suffered a kayfabe injury and was therefore unable to continue. On the August 11 episode of SmackDown, Escobar was taken out by Theory before the match started. Due to Escobar's injury, WWE Official Adam Pearce allowed Rey to take Escobar's place for the title match and defeated Theory to become the new United States Champion. This marks the first title win in the stable's history. On the September 9 episode of SmackDown, Escobar requested Rey for a dream match for the United States Championship. Two weeks later on SmackDown, Rey defeated Escobar to retain the title. After the match, the pair were attacked by The Street Profits and Bobby Lashley. A six-man tag team match between the LWO against Lashley and The Street Profits at Fastlane was made official the next day on SmackDown LowDown. On the following week's episode of SmackDown, Lashley and The Street Profits took out Wilde and Del Toro, leaving the LWO a man short for Fastlane. At Fastlane on October 7, Carlito made his permanent WWE return and joined the LWO to defeat Lashley and The Street Profits.

==== Feud with Legado Del Fantasma (2023–2024) ====
At Crown Jewel, Rey lost the United States Championship to Logan Paul, ending his reign at 89 days. During the match, Escobar appeared at ringside to snatch away a set of brass knuckles from a member of Paul's entourage but left the brass knuckles at the side of the ring while chasing Paul's entourage away only for Paul to use it on Rey to win the match. On the November 10 episode of SmackDown, Carlito accused Escobar of purposefully leaving the brass knuckles in the ring at Crown Jewel. After Carlito's match with Bobby Lashley, Escobar attacked Rey as Rey was checking on Carlito, turning heel and leaving the LWO. It was later reported that Rey had undergone surgery for his injured knee and will be out for at least six weeks. On the following week of SmackDown, Escobar chastised Rey for not sticking with him while kicking Vega, Wilde and Del Toro from Legado del Fantasma. A match between Carlito and Escobar was announced for Survivor Series: WarGames. A day before the event, Escobar took out Carlito in the ring and backstage. Dragon Lee saved Carlito from Escobar and SmackDown General Manager Nick Aldis allowed Lee to face Escobar as Carlito's replacement at Survivor Series: WarGames but Lee lost the match. On the December 1 episode of SmackDown, Escobar defeated Wilde and continued attacking him after the match, with Lee coming out to save Wilde. It was later announced that Lee will face Escobar in the United States Championship #1 Contender Tournament the following week, which Escobar won. On the December 5 episode of NXT, Rey announced that Lee will replace Wes Lee (who had to drop out as he needs back surgery) to face "Dirty" Dominik Mysterio for the NXT North American Championship at NXT Deadline. At the event, Rey accompanied Lee to the match, and Lee defeated Dominik to win his first title in WWE. On the December 19 episode of NXT, Lee successfully defended his title against Charlie Dempsey and Joe Coffey in a triple threat match. After the match, Dempsey's stable, The No Quarter Catch Crew, beat down Lee. Wilde and Del Toro then ran out to save Lee, which led to Lee, Wilde and Del Toro facing The No Quarter Catch Crew (Drew Gulak, Damon Kemp, & Myles Borne) at NXT: New Year's Evil on January 2, 2024, in a six-man tag team match. However, Lee missed the event due to travel issues, and a returning Carlito joined Wilde and Del Toro to win the match.

On the January 5, 2024 episode of SmackDown: New Year's Revolution, Del Toro and Wilde brawled with Los Lotharios (Angel Garza and Humberto Carrillo; later shortened to Angel and Berto), who formed an alliance with Escobar a few weeks prior to reform Legado Del Fantasma, at ringside during the United States Championship #1 Contender Tournament finals match between Escobar and Kevin Owens. The next week, Del Toro and Wilde were defeated by Los Lotharios in a tag team match with Carlito brawling with Escobar at ringside. Wilde and Del Toro participated in NXT's Dusty Rhodes Tag Team Classic tournament, defeating Chase University's Duke Hudson and Riley Osborne on the January 16 episode of NXT but lost to Carmelo Hayes and Trick Williams in the semifinals two weeks later. Despite teasing a reunion with Wilde and Del Toro in December 2023, Elektra Lopez made her SmackDown debut on the January 26 episode of SmackDown to assist Escobar defeat Carlito to reunite with Legado Del Fantasma. Vega and Carlito entered their respective Royal Rumble matches at the titular event as the 17th and third entrants respectively. Vega was eliminated by Shayna Baszler and Zoey Stark whereas Carlito eliminated Escobar and was eliminated by Bobby Lashley. Rey returned on the March 1 episode of SmackDown to help Carlito defeat Escobar in a street fight match. Two weeks later on the March 15th episode of SmackDown, Rey would challenge Escobar to a match. The following week, Rey would lose to Escobar due to an interference by his son, Dominik. This led to a tag team match between Rey and Dragon Lee, who became an official member of the LWO, and Dominik and Escobar set for Night 1 of WrestleMania XL. However, Lee was found attacked backstage and rendered him unable to compete for the match. Andrade was then named as Lee's replacement, and Rey and Andrade went on to defeat Dominik and Escobar at WrestleMania XL. On the April 26 episode of SmackDown, after Rey and Lee (who had returned from the attack) defeated Los Lotharios in a tag team match, Escobar revealed that it was Carlito who attacked Lee. Carlito then attacked Rey and Lee, turning heel and leaving LWO.

==== Various feuds (2024–present) ====
At Night 2 of the 2024 WWE Draft, LWO (including Carlito) were drafted to the Raw brand. It was later revealed that Rey pulled some strings to get Carlito drafted to Raw alongside LWO to ensure that Carlito pays for his actions against the stable, reigniting the feud with The Judgment Day in the process.

In November, Lee joined the Speed Championship #1 contender's tournament, defeating NXT's No Quarter Catch Crew's Tavion Heights and Akira Tozawa in the quarterfinals and semifinals respectively. He then received a bye to the championship match, where he defeated Speed Champion Andrade for the title on the November 15 taping of Speed aired on November 20. On the January 25, 2025 episode of Raw, Vega was separated from the group and was moved over to the SmackDown brand via a transfer window. In early 2025, LWO started a feud with American Made after Chad Gable, who lost to a debuting Penta, went on a quest to learn the ways of lucha libre and returned as El Grande Americano. On the WrestleMania 41 Night 1 pre-show, Mysterio stated that he would not be able to compete against El Grande Americano due to injuries on SmackDown the night before. Instead, Rey Fenix would replace Mysterio to fight Americano but lost.

At WWE X AAA Worlds Collide, Mysterio opened the show as a neutral guest of honor, while Dragon Lee and Cruz del Toro competed in a six-man tag team match, while Lince Dorado filled in for the injured Joaquin Wilde. They lost to Octagón Jr., Aero Star, and Mr. Iguana by pinfall. Wilde and Del Toro, representing the LWO, then joined Dorado in WWE Evolve for a multi-episode event taking on The Vanity Project.

In 2026, the LWO started a feud with Ethan Page and Rusev who had been feuding with Penta and Je'Von Evans for several weeks in late April, which eventually culminate in late May when Penta went on to retain his WWE Intercontinental Championship against Page at Saturday Night's Main Event. Mysterio was also named the new General Manager of Lucha Libre AAA Worldwide on May 23, 2026, having to sanction the Mask vs Mask match between the two El Grande Americanos for Noche de Los Grandes. At the event, the "Original" El Grande Americano was revealed to be Chad Gable himself. On the May 25, 2026 episode of Raw, Mysterio defeated Rusev with the help of Lee. One week later, on June 1, Mysterio and Lee teamed together and faced Page and Rusev and the two were victorious. The following week, on the June 8 episode of Raw, Mysterio failed to win the WWE Intercontinental Championship from Penta. After the match, Page and Rusev came out and attacked both men and took Mysterio's mask. However, Lee and the newly returned Chad Gable then came out to fend off both Page and Rusev. Shortly after, Gable gave back Mysterio's mask.

== Members ==
| * | Founding member(s) |
| I–II | Leader(s) |

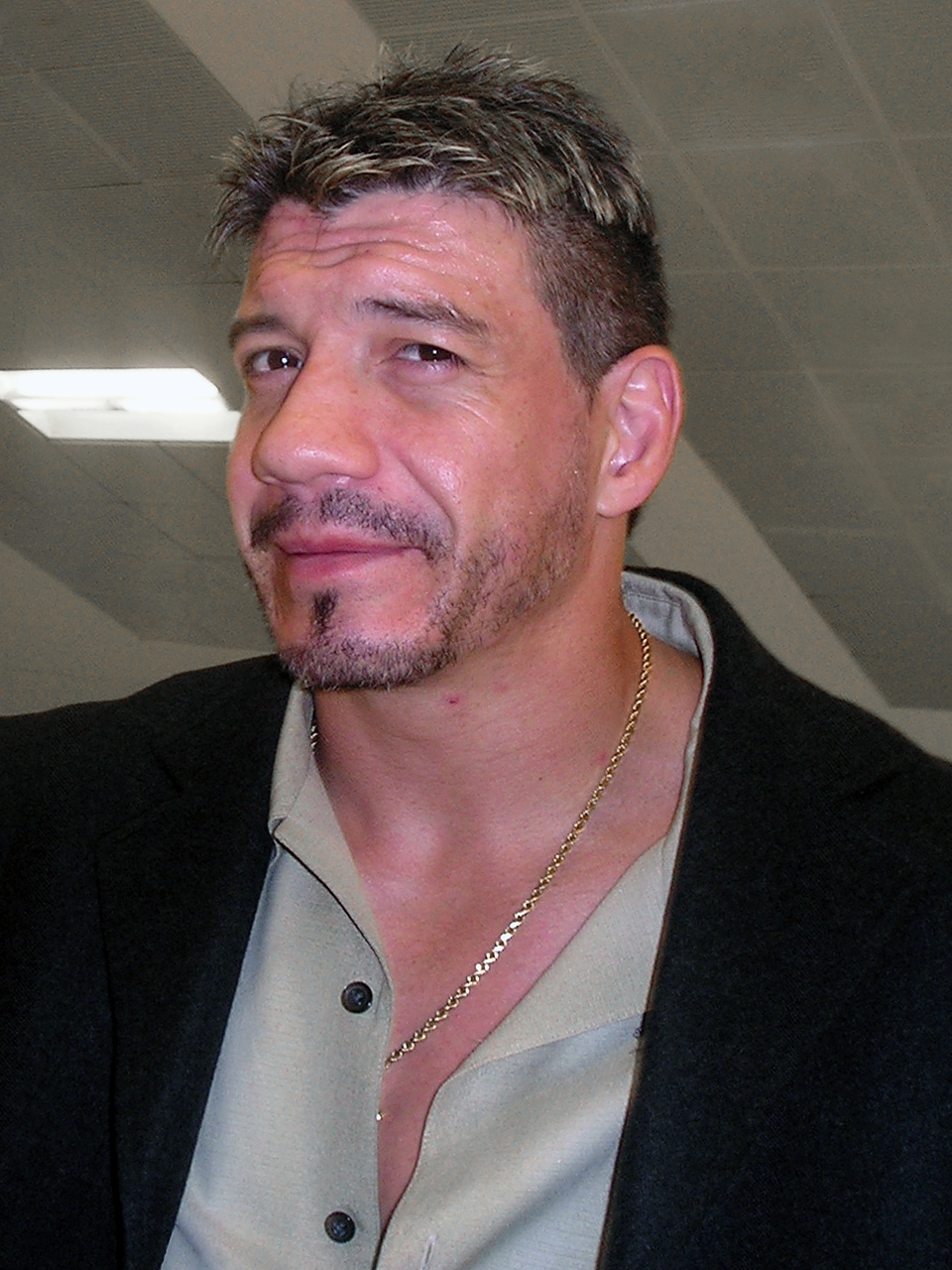
Eddie Guerrero (I)

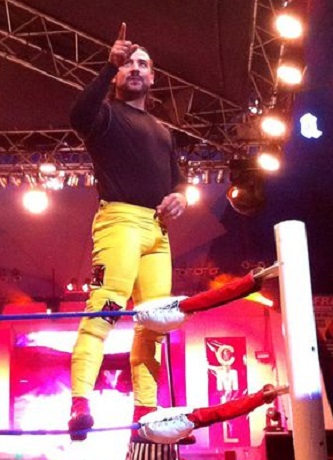
Héctor Garza

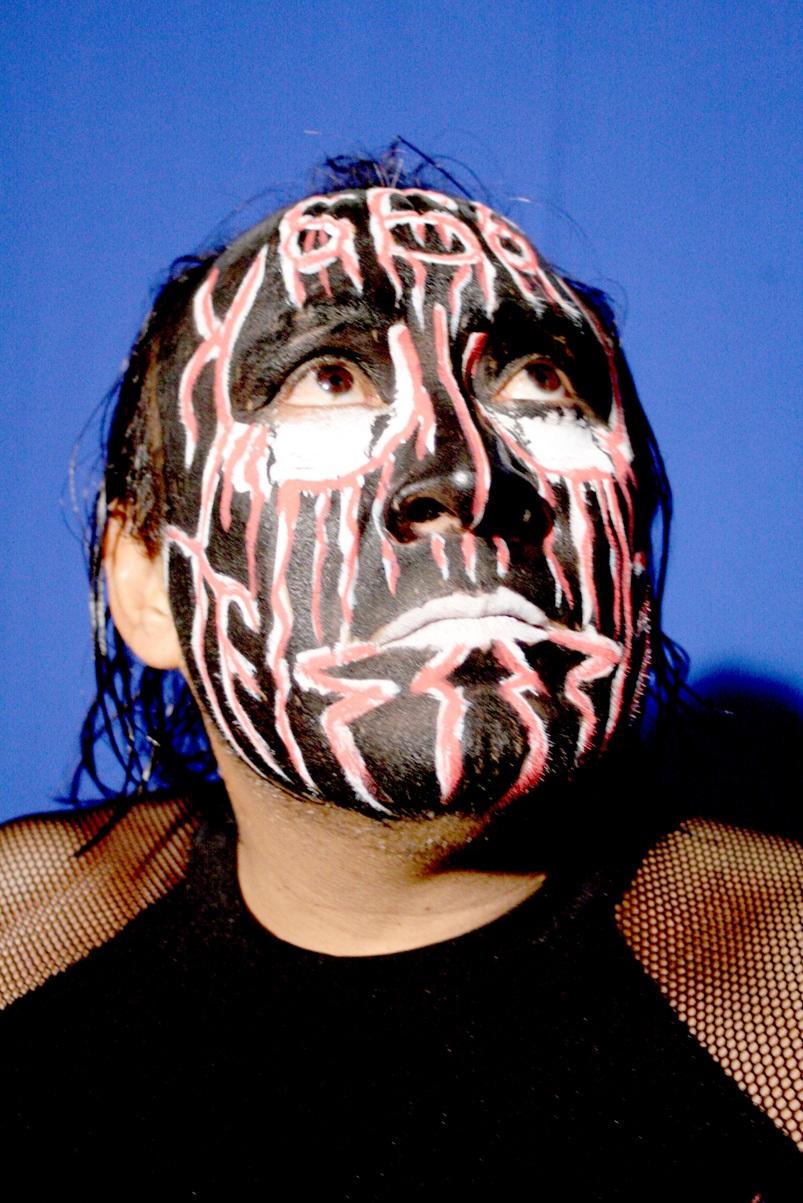
Damián

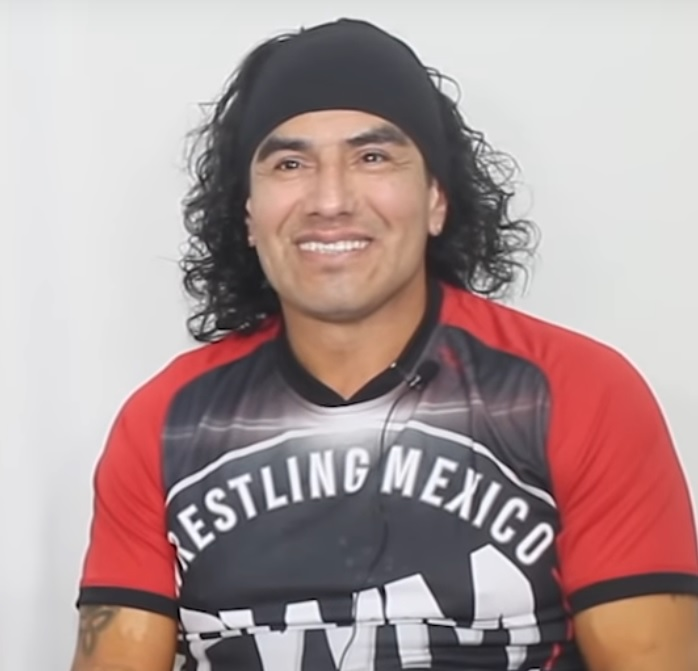
Psychosis

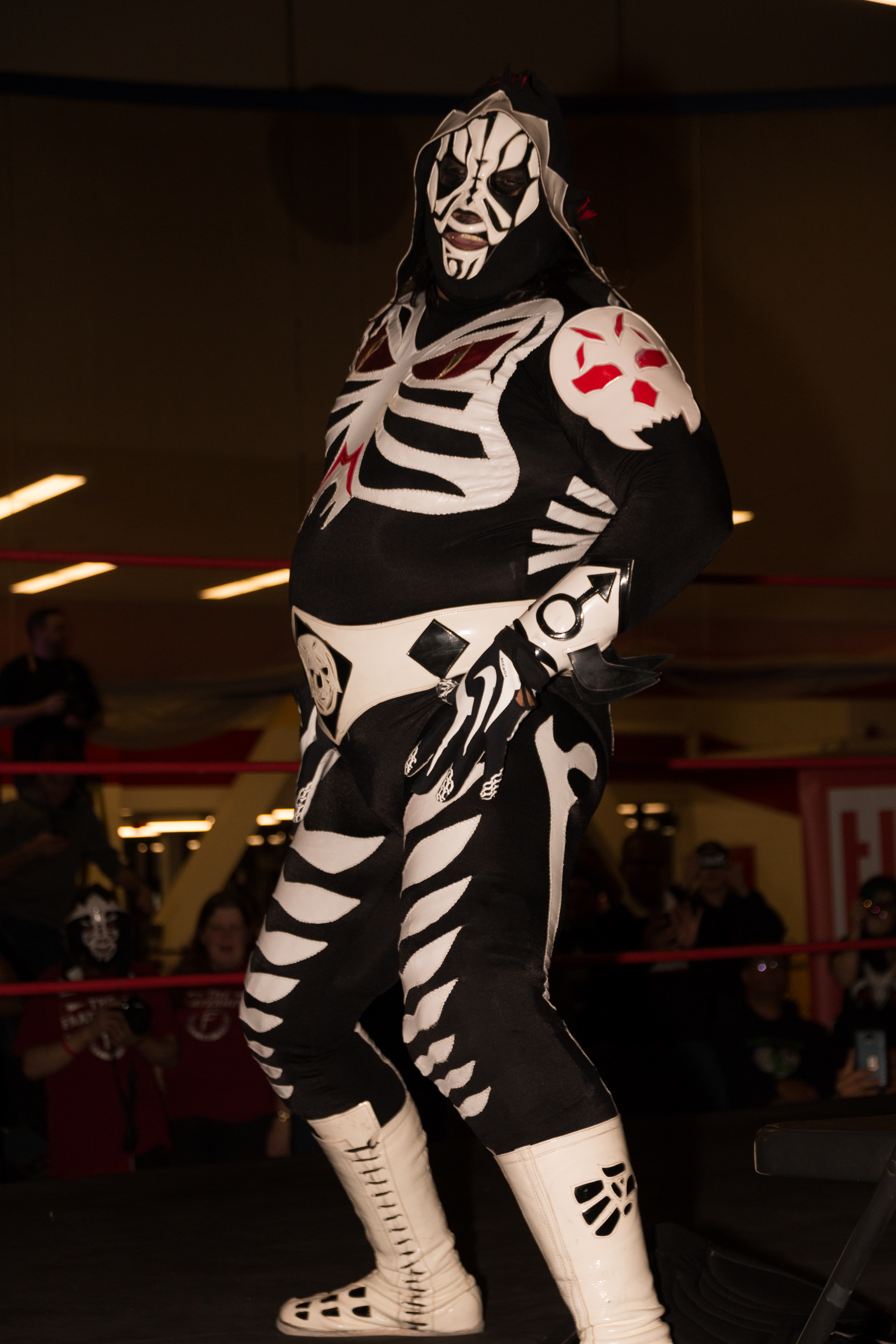
La Parka

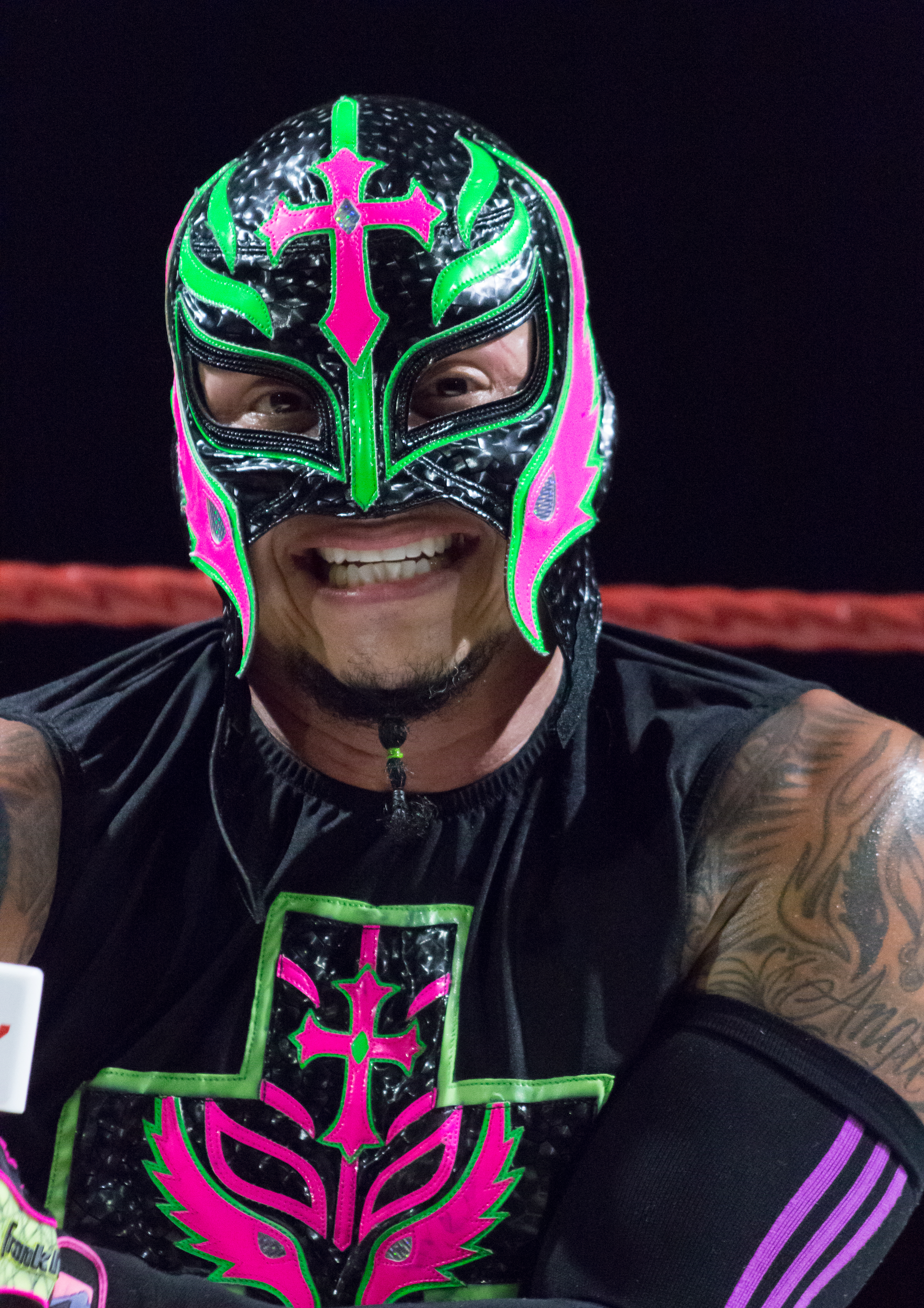
Rey Mysterio Jr.

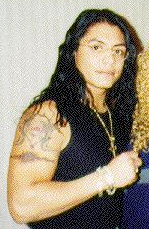
Juventud Guerrera

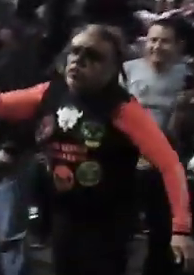
Ciclope

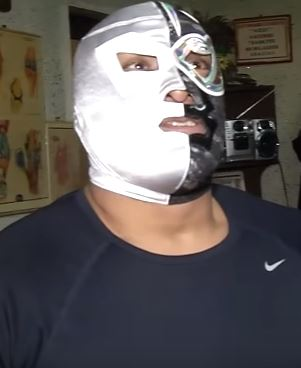
Silver King

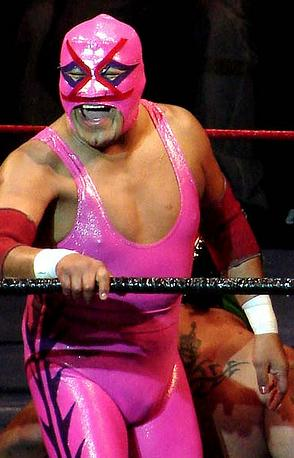
Villano V

=== WCW ===
| Member | | Joined | Left |
|---|---|---|---|
| Eddie Guerrero | *I | October 5, 1998 | January 1, 1999 |
| Héctor Garza | * | October 5, 1998 | January 11, 1999 |
| Damián | * | October 5, 1998 | January 11, 1999 |
| El Dandy | | October 8, 1998 | January 11, 1999 |
| Psychosis | | October 12, 1998 | January 11, 1999 |
| La Parka | | October 19, 1998 | January 11, 1999 |
| Spyder | | October 26, 1998 | January 11, 1999 |
| Rey Mysterio Jr. | | November 16, 1998 | January 11, 1999 |
| Juventud Guerrera | | November 22, 1998 | January 11, 1999 |
| Ciclope | | December 3, 1998 | January 11, 1999 |
| Silver King | | December 5, 1998 | January 11, 1999 |
| Villano V | | December 14, 1998 | January 11, 1999 |

=== WWE ===
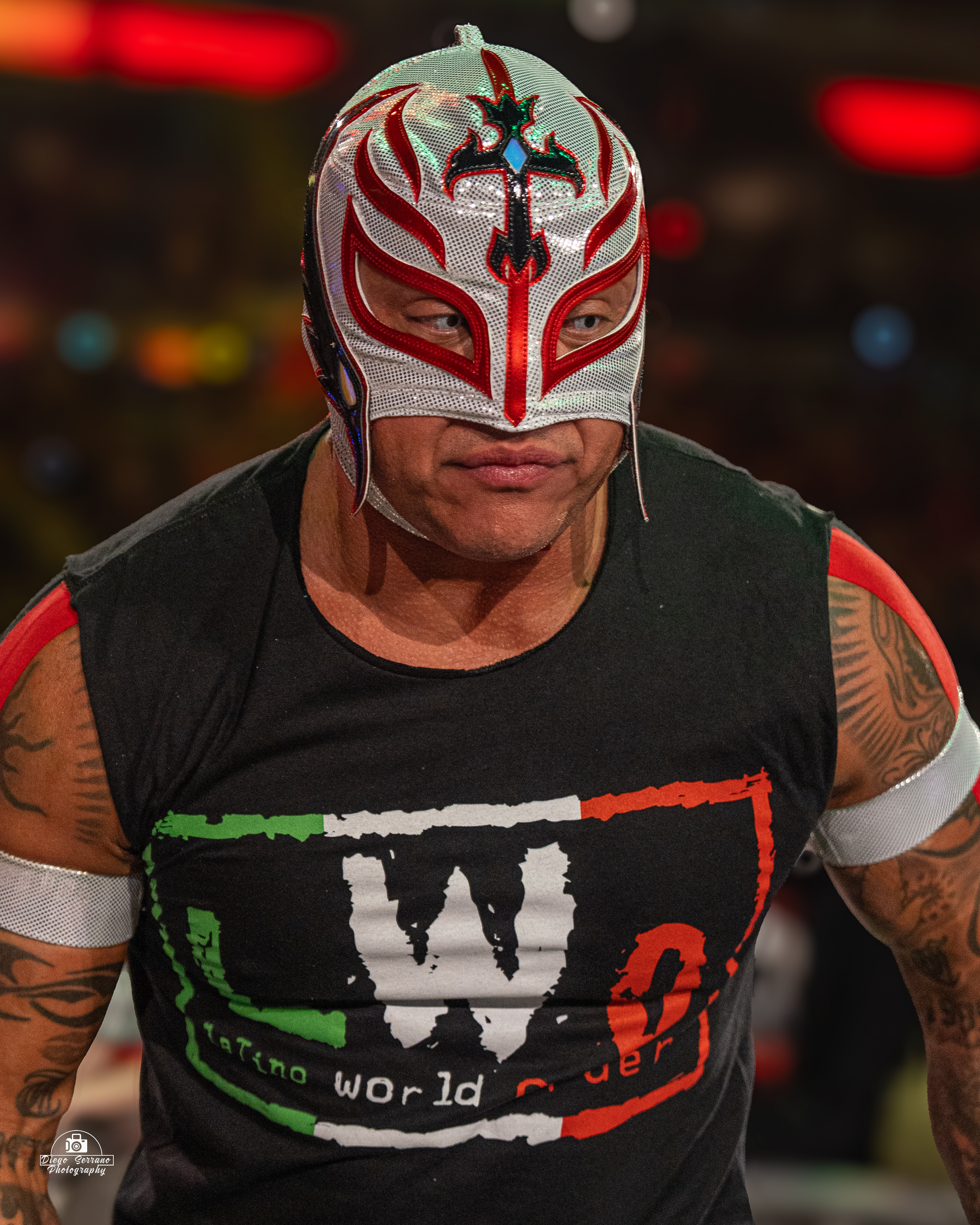
Rey Mysterio (II)

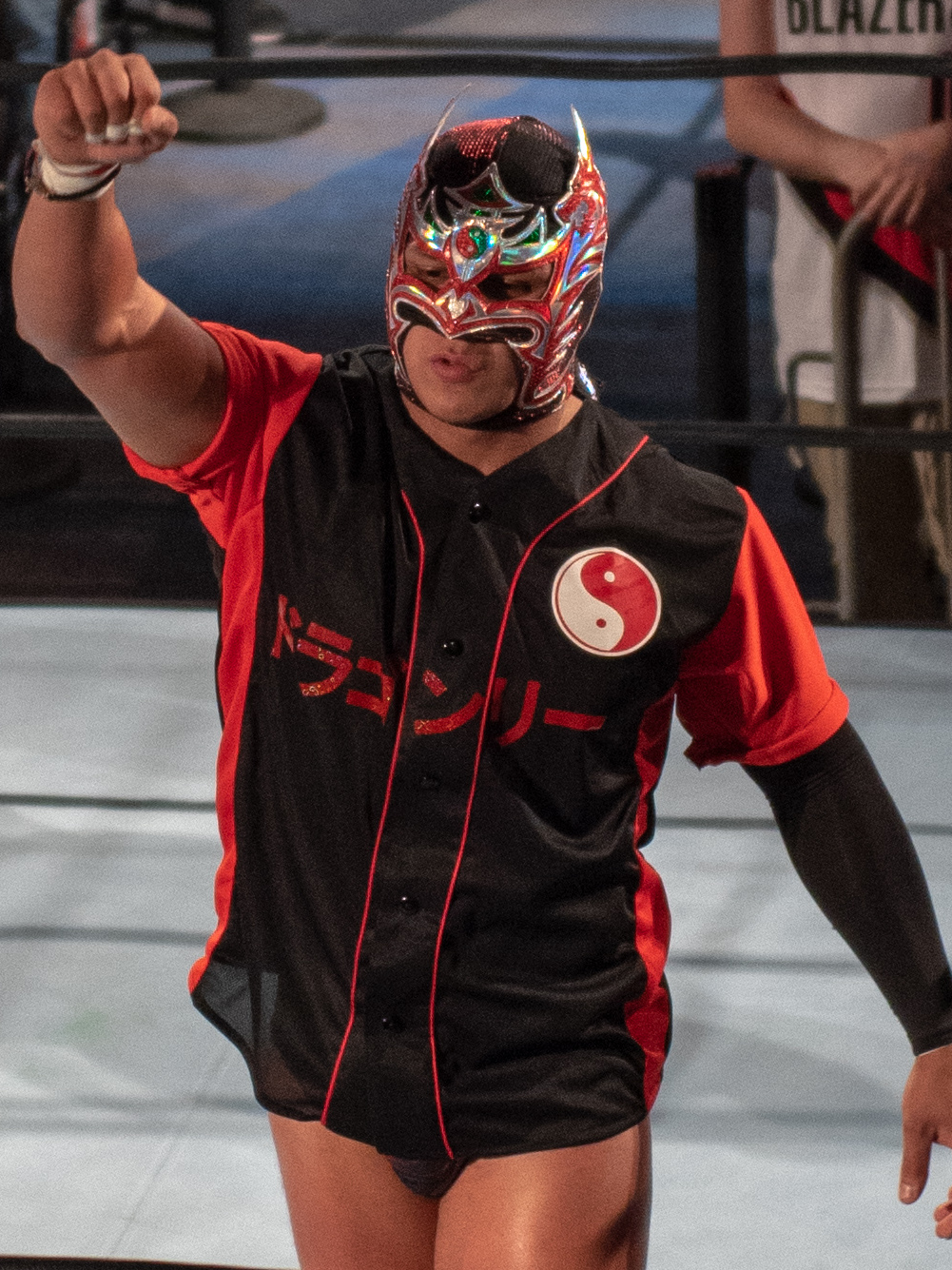
Dragon Lee

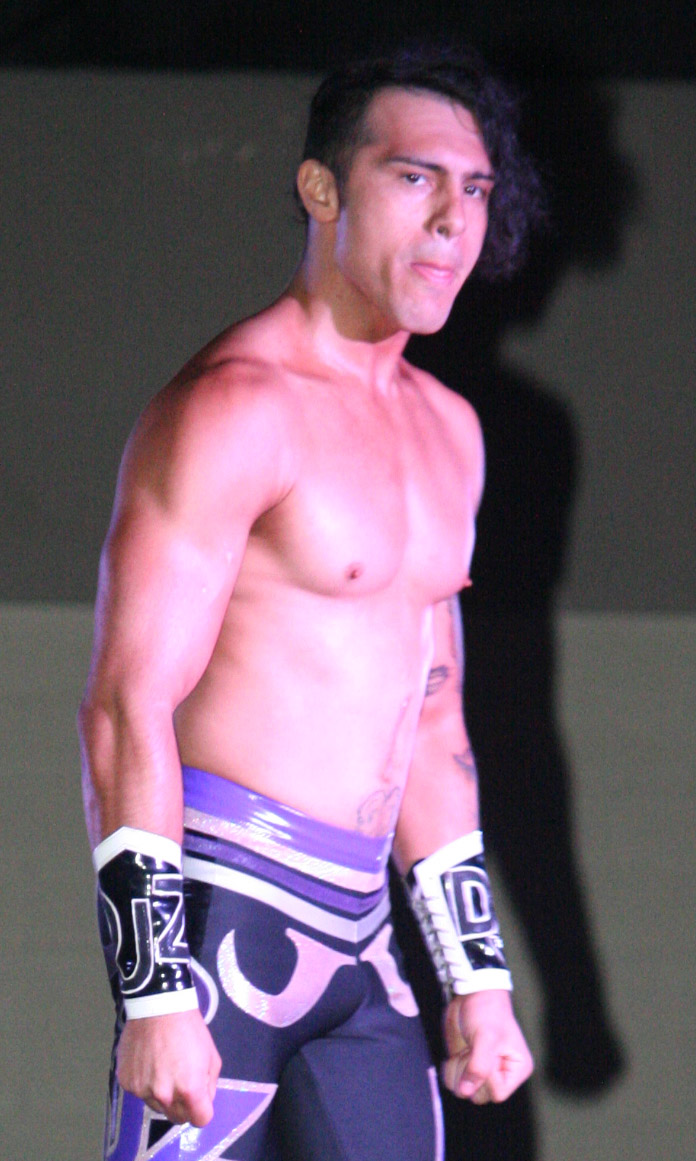
Joaquin Wilde

==== Current ====
| Member | | Joined |
|---|---|---|
| Rey Mysterio | II | March 31, 2023 |
| Cruz Del Toro | | March 31, 2023 |
| Joaquin Wilde | | March 31, 2023 |
| Dragon Lee | | March 29, 2024 |

==== Former ====
| Member | Joined | Left |
|---|---|---|
| Santos Escobar | March 31, 2023 | November 10, 2023 |
| Carlito | October 7, 2023 | April 26, 2024 |
| Zelina Vega | March 31, 2023 | January 27, 2025 |

== Sub-groups ==
=== Former ===
| Affiliate | Members | Tenure | Type | Promotion(s) |
|---|---|---|---|---|
| Legado Del Fantasma | Santos Escobar (L); Joaquin Wilde; Cruz Del Toro; Zelina Vega | 2023 | Stable | WWE |

== Championships and accomplishments ==
- WWE
  - WWE United States Championship (1 time) – Mysterio
  - WWE Speed Championship (1 time) – Lee
  - WWE Speed Championship #1 Contender Tournament (2024) – Lee
