= NXT Super Tuesday =

2020 television event

- Promotion: WWE
- Brand: NXT
- Date: August 26 and September 8, 2020 (aired September 1 and 8, 2020)
- City: Winter Park, Florida
- Venue: Full Sail University
- Attendance: 0 (behind closed doors) (Note: The event was held without a paying audience due to the COVID-19 pandemic in the United States, though it featured a live crowd of WWE wrestlers and trainees.)

NXT special episodes chronology
← Previous; The Great American Bash	Next → Halloween Havoc

NXT Super Tuesday was a two-week long professional wrestling television special episode of WWE's weekly television series NXT, broadcast on the USA Network. It took place on September 1 (taped August 26) and September 8, 2020 at Full Sail University in Winter Park, Florida.

== Production ==
=== Background ===
Because of a scheduling conflict with the 2020 NHL Stanley Cup playoffs on USA Network in NXT's normal Wednesday night time slot, the show was temporarily moved to Tuesday night for a two-week period. As with WWE's other NXT events during the COVID-19 pandemic since mid-March, the two-week event was presented from a behind closed doors set at NXT's home base of Full Sail University in Winter Park, Florida.

=== Storylines ===
NXT Super Tuesday featured professional wrestling matches that involved different wrestlers from pre-existing scripted feuds and storylines. Wrestlers portrayed heroes, villains, or less distinguishable characters in scripted events that built tension and culminated in a wrestling match or series of matches.

At NXT TakeOver XXX, Karrion Kross successfully defeated Keith Lee to win the NXT Championship. However, after the match, it was learned that Kross had legitimately separated his shoulder at some point during the bout, forcing Kross to relinquish the championship on the August 26th episode of NXT, due to an inability to be medically cleared to compete. Later in the show, NXT general manager William Regal announced a 60 minute Fatal 4-Way iron man match between Johnny Gargano, Finn Bálor, Tommaso Ciampa, and Adam Cole to crown a new champion on Super Tuesday.

== Reception ==
NXT Super Tuesday averaged 849,000 viewers with a 0.26 rating in the 18-49 key demographic for the first week and 838,000 viewers with a 0.22 rating for the second week. The first week was #10 in the top 10 programs watched on cable, while its position fell to #15 for the second week. These were their best viewership and key demo numbers since their last TV special, The Great American Bash.

== Results ==
NXT Super Tuesday (September 1)
No.	Results	Stipulations	Times
1	Isaiah "Swerve" Scott and Breezango (Fandango and Tyler Breeze) defeated Legado Del Fantasma (Santos Escobar, Joaquin Wilde, and Raul Mendoza)	Six man tag team street fight	11:53
2	Candice LeRae defeated Kacy Catanzaro (with Kayden Carter)	Singles match	3:00
3	Timothy Thatcher defeated Bronson Reed	Singles match	4:46
4	Tommaso Ciampa (1) vs. Adam Cole (2) vs. Johnny Gargano (1) vs. Finn Bálor (2) ended in a tie between Cole and Bálor	Fatal 4-way Iron Man match for the vacant NXT Championship	60:00

NXT Super Tuesday II (September 8)
No.	Results	Stipulations	Times
1	Finn Bálor defeated Adam Cole	Singles match for the vacant NXT Championship	23:09
2	Velveteen Dream defeated Ashante "Thee" Adonis	Singles match	1:35
3	Bronson Reed defeated Austin Theory	Singles match	10:48
4	Roderick Strong (with Bobby Fish) defeated Killian Dain	Singles match	4:05
5	Rhea Ripley defeated Mercedes Martinez (with Robert Stone)	Steel cage match	14:21

=== Fatal 4-Way Iron Man match ===
Score				Point winner	Fall loser	Decision	Notes	Time
Bálor	Cole	Gargano	Ciampa	Point winner	Fall loser	Decision	Notes	Time
1	0	0	0	Finn Bálor	Adam Cole	Pinfall	Pinned after the Coup de Grace	25:29
1	0	1	0	Johnny Gargano	Finn Bálor	Pinfall	Pinned after Ciampa hit Bálor with the Fairy Tale Ending	33:19
1	1	1	0	Adam Cole	Johnny Gargano	Pinfall	Pinned after the Panama Sunrise	35:19
1	1	1	1	Tommaso Ciampa	Adam Cole	Pinfall	Pinned after the Fairy Tale Ending	37:15
2	1	1	1	Finn Bálor	Tommaso Ciampa	Pinfall	Pinned after the Coup de Grace	59:41
2	2	1	1	Adam Cole	Finn Bálor	Pinfall	Pinned after The Last Shot	59:59
Winners				Adam Cole and Finn Bálor	—N/a			60:00

== See also ==
- 2020 in professional wrestling
