= Legado Del Fantasma =

Professional wrestling stable

- The logo as Legado Del Fantasma - inspired by the Latino World Order stable

Stable
- Name: Legado Del Fantasma
- Former members: Santos Escobar (leader); Cruz Del Toro; Joaquin Wilde; Elektra Lopez; Zelina Vega; Angel; Berto
- Debut: June 10, 2020
- Disbanded: April 24, 2026
- Years active: 2020–2026

Legado Del Fantasma (sometimes shortened as LDF) was a rudo ("heel") Mexican professional wrestling stable that performed in WWE and its sister promotion Lucha Libre AAA Worldwide (AAA).

Legado Del Fantasma was originally a trio formed in 2020 by Santos Escobar, Cruz Del Toro, and Joaquin Wilde in WWE's developmental territory, NXT, as when Escobar, who at the time performed under the masked persona of El Hijo del Fantasma, turned on Drake Maverick and joined forces with Wilde and Del Toro (then known as Raul Mendoza) and unmasked himself, thus forming Legado Del Fantasma. In August 2021, Elektra Lopez joined as the group's manager.

In August 2022, Escobar lost to Tony D'Angelo in a street fight, and per stipulation, Escobar had to leave NXT. The following week, Escobar took the rest of the stable with him away from NXT (except Lopez, who remained in NXT), ending their tenure on the brand. Legado Del Fantasma then debuted on the main roster nearly two months later on SmackDown with Zelina Vega replacing Lopez. After assisting Rey Mysterio in early 2023, Mysterio brought the group into the revived Latino World Order (LWO) to feud with The Judgment Day. Later in November, Escobar defected from the LWO and feuded with Mysterio and the LWO. Escobar later brought in Angel Garza and Humberto Carrillo (eventually becoming Angel and Berto) alongside Elektra Lopez (the latter making her main roster debut) as the revived Legado Del Fantasma. In February 2025, Lopez was removed from the group after being released by WWE. In April 2026, the stable disbanded after Escobar was released from WWE.

== History ==
=== WWE (2020–2026) ===
==== NXT (2020–2022) ====
On the June 3, 2020 episode of NXT, El Hijo del Fantasma defeated Drake Maverick in the finals of a tournament to become the interim NXT Cruiserweight Champion due to outside interference by the two masked abductors who had attacked various cruiserweights. The following week, on NXT, Maverick congratulated Fantasma and demanded a title shot but then two masked men who had been attacking wrestlers randomly confronted the duo and then Fantasma turned on Maverick by attacking him and unmasked himself. He changed his name to "Santos Escobar" while the two masked men were revealed to be Joaquin Wilde and Raul Mendoza. On the night one of The Great American Bash, the trio was named "Legado del Fantasma". In their first match as a team, Legado del Fantasma defeated Maverick and Breezango in a six-man tag team match on the second night of The Great American Bash.

The group was focused on ensuring that Escobar retained the Cruiserweight Championship while Wilde and Mendoza also began competing in NXT's tag team division and 205 Live. At NXT TakeOver XXX, Wilde and Mendoza competed against Breezango (Fandango and Tyler Breeze) and the team of Oney Lorcan and Danny Burch in a triple threat match to determine the #1 contenders for the NXT Tag Team Championship. The match was won by Breezango. At the night one of Super Tuesday, Legado lost to Isaiah Scott and Breezango in a street fight when Scott pinned Escobar, leading up to a match between Escobar and Scott for Escobar's Cruiserweight Championship at NXT TakeOver 31, where Wilde and Mendoza assisted Escobar in retaining the title.

In 2021, Wilde and Mendoza entered the 2021 Dusty Rhodes Tag Team Classic in which they lost to the eventual winners MSK (Nash Carter and Wes Lee) in the semifinal round. They also faced MSK and Grizzled Young Veterans (James Drake and Zack Gibson) on night one of NXT TakeOver: Stand & Deliver in a match with the Tag Team titles on the line, which MSK won. On the night two of Stand & Deliver, Wilde and Mendoza assisted Escobar in defeating the reigning Cruiserweight Champion Jordan Devlin in a ladder match to become the undisputed Cruiserweight Champion. However, Escobar lost the title to Kushida on the April 13 episode of NXT. Escobar would fail to regain the title from Kushida in a two out of three falls match on the May 11 episode of NXT.

At NXT TakeOver: In Your House, Legado del Fantasma would face NXT North American Champion Bronson Reed and NXT Tag Team champions MSK in a winners take all, six man tag team match in which Legado Del Fantasma would lose the match. On the August 24 episode of NXT, Elektra Lopez made her debut, helping Legado Del Fantasma win against Hit Row. On the September 28 episode of NXT, Lopez would defeat Hit Row's B-Fab in a no disqualification match and two weeks later, Escobar would fail to win the NXT North American Championship from Scott, ending the feud (Hit Row would get drafted to SmackDown in the WWE Draft). In early 2022, Escobar would feud with NXT Champion Bron Breakker, leading to a match between the two for the NXT Championship at Vengeance Day, where Escobar lost despite interference from Dolph Ziggler. At NXT Stand & Deliver, Escobar failed to win the NXT North American Championship in a ladder match. Shortly after Stand & Deliver, Legado Del Fantasma would feud with Tony D'Angelo, the self proclaimed "Don of NXT" and his "family". At this point, they would slowly turn into faces while portraying heelish tactics. After multiple meetings and kidnappings, Escobar defeated D'Angelo on the May 17 episode of NXT. However, at In Your House on June 4, Legado Del Fantasma lost to The D'Angelo Family (Tony D'Angelo, Stacks and Two Dimes) with the losers having to join the other person's family. With Legado joining the D'Angelo Family, they would accompany each other during matches with them usually losing. On the June 21 episode of NXT, Escobar cost D'Angelo his title match against NXT North American Champion Carmelo Hayes. At The Great American Bash on July 5, it was revealed that Escobar was hospitalized and the other members of Legado began working with The Lord D'Angelo Family. On the August 2 episode of NXT, Escobar returned and cost D'Angelo and Stacks their title match against The Creed Brothers, signaling that their alliance has come to an end. D'Angelo and Escobar had one final meeting the following week where they agreed to a street fight for NXT Heatwave on August 16, stating that if Escobar wins, Legado would be free from The D'Angelo Family, but if D'Angelo wins, Escobar agrees to leave NXT with Legado. At Heatwave, D'Angelo defeated Escobar, signaling the end of his time on the brand. However on the following episode of NXT, Escobar appeared in a backstage segment inside a van. He would pick up the rest of his Legado teammates, and they would drive off, signaling that the stable had left NXT.

==== Main roster debut and Latino World Order (2022–2023) ====
On the October 7, 2022, episode of SmackDown, Legado Del Fantasma (with Zelina Vega replacing Lopez) attacked Hit Row during their entrance, marking the group's main roster debut as heels. At the Royal Rumble on January 28, 2023, Escobar entered his first Royal Rumble match at #10, but was eliminated by Brock Lesnar while Vega entered the women’s Royal Rumble match at #21 but was eliminated by Lacey Evans.

On the February 10 episode of SmackDown, Escobar competed in a fatal four-way match to determine the number #1 contender for the Intercontinental Championship, which was won by Madcap Moss. After the match in an off-air exclusive, Escobar approached Rey Mysterio, who also competed in the match, and showed respect. Escobar and Mysterio exchanged masks, starting a face turn for Escobar who then became involved in Rey’s feud with his son, Dominik and The Judgment Day. On the March 3 episode of SmackDown, Escobar was defeated by Dominik after interference from Rhea Ripley. After the match, Dominik tore up the mask Rey gave to Escobar, cementing his face turn. On the March 10, 2023 episode of SmackDown, as Rey was about to address his induction to the WWE Hall of Fame Class of 2023, he was interrupted by The Judgment Day, only for Legado Del Fantasma to show up and assist Rey, establishing the entire stable as faces. Since then, Rey reformed the Latino World Order and Legado Del Fantasma joined. On Night 1 of WrestleMania 39, Escobar, Wilde, Del Toro and Bad Bunny assisted Rey in his match against Dominik, who was assisted by Finn Bálor and Damian Priest. Rey went on to win his match against Dominik.

On the April 21 episode of SmackDown, Vega requested a match against Rhea Ripley for the SmackDown Women's Championship at Backlash, which was granted by WWE Official Adam Pearce. However, Vega failed to win the title from Ripley but received a standing ovation from the hometown crowd after the match. Vega defeated Lacey Evans to qualify for the 2023 women's Money in the Bank ladder match on the June 2 episode of SmackDown. Escobar defeated Mustafa Ali to qualify for the 2023 men's Money in the Bank ladder match on the June 9 episode of SmackDown. Vega and Escobar failed to win their respective Money in the Bank ladder matches in the namesake event. On the July 28 episode of SmackDown, Escobar and Rey faced each other in the United States Championship Invitational tournament finals, where Escobar will go on to face Austin Theory for the United States Championship after Rey suffered an injury during the tournament finals match. On the August 11 episode of SmackDown, Escobar was taken out by Theory before the match has started. Due to Escobar's injury, Pearce allowed Rey to take Escobar's place for the title match and defeated Theory to become the new United States Champion.

==== Changes in formation and disbandement (2023–2026) ====
At Crown Jewel, during Rey's defense of the United States Championship against Logan Paul, Escobar snatched away brass knuckles from a member of Paul's entourage but left it on the edge of the ring while chasing Paul's entourage away, which Paul used on Rey to win the match. On the November 10 episode of SmackDown, Escobar was accused by Carlito, who had recently joined the LWO at Fastlane, for leaving the brass knuckles at the side of the ring at Crown Jewel, to which Escobar furiously stormed off. After Carlito's match with Bobby Lashley, Escobar attacked Rey as Rey was checking on Carlito, turning heel, leaving the LWO. On the following week's episode of SmackDown, Escobar entered using the Legado del Fantasma theme. He chastised Rey for not sticking with him and kicked Vega, Wilde and Del Toro from the stable.

On the December 22 episode of SmackDown, Los Garza (Angel and Humberto) helped Escobar defeat Lashley in the United States Number 1 Contender Tournament, with Escobar dubbing the group as the "Legado World Order". Escobar lost to Kevin Owens in the finals at SmackDown: New Year's Revolution on January 5, 2024. Two weeks later, the newly revived Legado Del Fantasma defeated Carlito, Wilde and Del Toro in a six-man tag team match. Despite teasing a reunion with Wilde and Del Toro in December 2023, Elektra Lopez appeared on the January 26 episode of SmackDown to assist Escobar defeat Carlito in her reunion with Legado Del Fantasma. Escobar entered the Royal Rumble match at the titular event as the seventh entrant and was eliminated by Carlito. On the March 1 episode of SmackDown, Rey returned to help Carlito defeat Escobar in a street fight match. Three weeks later, Escobar defeated Rey after interference from his son, "Dirty" Dominik Mysterio of The Judgment Day. One week later, Escobar thanked Dominik for his actions. Rey interrupted, introduced Dragon Lee as the newest member of the LWO, and Rey and Lee subsequently challenged Escobar and Dominik to a tag team match at WrestleMania XL, which was made official for Night 1. At WrestleMania XL Night 1 on April 6, Santos and Dominik teamed up against Rey and Andrade in a losing effort after interference from Lane Johnson and Jason Kelce.

On the January 10, 2025 episode of SmackDown Los Garza (Angel and Berto) defeated Pretty Deadly in a first round #1 contendership match to determine the next challenger for the WWE Tag Team Championship. During the #1 tag team tournament finals Angel and Berto faced The Motor City Machine Guns but were unsuccessful. On February 9, Elektra Lopez was released from WWE separating her from the stable. In June, Berto won the Speed Championship #1 Contender Tournament but failed to win the title. On April 24, 2026, Escobar was released from his WWE contract, ending Legado Del Fantasma as a stable.

=== Lucha Libre AAA Worldwide (2025–2026) ===
On June 15, 2025, Los Garza made their Lucha Libre AAA Worldwide (AA) debut, winning the AAA World Tag Team Championship at Triplemanía Regia III. Los Garza lost the titles on August 16 at Triplemanía XXXIII to Pagano and Psycho Clown in a Street Fight, ending their reign at 62 days.

== Members ==
*	Founding member(s)
L	Leader
M	Manager

Member	Joined	Left
Santos Escobar (L)	June 10, 2020 *	April 24, 2026
Joaquin Wilde	June 10, 2020 *	November 17, 2023
Cruz Del Toro	June 10, 2020 *	November 17, 2023
Zelina Vega (M)	October 7, 2022	November 17, 2023
Elektra Lopez (M)	August 24, 2021	February 9, 2025
Angel	December 22, 2023	April 24, 2026
Berto	December 22, 2023	April 24, 2026

== Sub-groups ==
Affiliate	Members	Tenure	Type
Los Garza	Angel; Berto	2023-2026	Tag team

== Championships and accomplishments ==
- Lucha Libre AAA Worldwide
  - AAA World Tag Team Championship (1 time) – Angel and Berto
- WWE
  - NXT Cruiserweight Championship (1 time) – Escobar
  - WWE Speed Championship #1 Contender Tournament (2025) – Berto
