= Humberto Carrillo =

Mexican professional wrestler (born 1995)

Personal information
- Born: Humberto Garza Carrillo; October 20, 1995 (age 30) Monterrey, Nuevo Leon, Mexico
- Spouse: Tania Ramirez (m. 2019)
- Relatives: Héctor Garza (uncle); Angel Garza (cousin)
- Family: Garza

Professional wrestling career
- Ring name(s): Berto; Humberto; Humberto Carrillo; Último Ninja
- Billed height: 1.85 m (6 ft 1 in)
- Billed weight: 100 kg (220 lb)
- Billed from: Monterrey, Mexico
- Trained by: Mario Segura; Mr. Lince
- Debut: December 16, 2012

Humberto Garza Carrillo (born October 20, 1995) is a Mexican professional wrestler. He is signed to WWE, where he performs on the Raw brand under the ring name Berto (shortened from his previous ring name Humberto Carrillo). He also appears in Lucha Libre AAA Worldwide as a member of Los Perros del Mal where he is one-third of the AAA World Trios Champions with stablemates Daga and Angel in their first reign both as a stable and individually.

He previously worked under the ring name Último Ninja while wrestling in Mexico. He is a third-generation luchador, being the son of Humberto Garza Jr., the grandson of Humberto Garza, as well as the nephew of Hector Garza.

== Professional wrestling career ==
=== Early career (2012–2018) ===
On December 16, 2012, Carrillo began his professional wrestling career as Último Ninja when he performed at Wrestling in Monterrey when he teamed up with El Ninja Jr. in a winning effort against Genocida and The Beast. Último Ninja would then wrestle in Mexico for the next six years in other wrestling promotions including Casanova Pro, Nueva Generacion Xtrema, Lucha Libre Del Norte, Lucha Libre Azteca, The Crash Lucha Libre, Chilanga Mask, Empresa Regiomontana de Lucha Libre, RIOT Wrestling Alliance, Promociones MDA and many more. During his career in Mexico, Último Ninja won numerous championships including the PCLL Tag Team Championship, the LyC Tag Team Championship, The Crash Tag Team Champions and the WWA World Middleweight Championship. Último Ninja has also competed in Pro Wrestling Noah, Baja Stars USA, Martinez Entertainment Lucha Libre Mexicana, and Major League Wrestling.

=== WWE (2018–present) ===
==== NXT and 205 Live (2018–2019) ====
On August 23, 2018, Humberto Carrillo started competing for the WWE and signed his official contract on October 18, 2018, along with other recruits. Prior to that, Carrillo had made an appearance on the September 19 edition of NXT against Jaxson Ryker in a losing effort.

On the December 5 edition of NXT, Carrillo would make his televised return when he teamed with Raul Mendoza in a losing effort against Steve Cutler and Wesley Blake of The Forgotten Sons. On the January 16, 2019 edition of NXT, Carrillo competed against Johnny Gargano in a losing effort.

On the January 15, 2019 edition of 205 Live, Carrillo made his main roster debut when he answered the WWE Cruiserweight Champion Buddy Murphy's open challenge in a losing effort. Despite this, General Manager Drake Maverick revealed after the show that Carrillo has joined the 205 Live roster and would compete at the WWE Worlds Collide Tournament at the Royal Rumble Axxess. At the event, he defeated Zack Gibson in the first round before losing to Velveteen Dream in the quarterfinals. The following week, Carrillo scored his first win on the brand defeating Gran Metalik. On February 5, 2019, Carrillo competed in a fatal four-way elimination match to determine who would challenge Buddy Murphy for the WWE Cruiserweight Championship at Elimination Chamber, which Carrillo lost. On August 27, 2019, Carrillo defeated Oney Lorcan to earn a title shot against Drew Gulak for the WWE Cruiserweight Championship at Clash of Champions. At Clash of Champions, he was defeated by Gulak, in a triple threat match also involving Lince Dorado.

==== Main roster debut (2019–2021) ====
In October 2019, it was announced that as part of the 2019 draft, Carrillo was drafted to the Raw brand, where he received a push, including a tag team match with former MMA fighter Cain Velasquez in his home country, Mexico. Carrillo made his debut on the October 21 episode, losing to WWE Universal Champion Seth Rollins and had two singles matches against the WWE United States Champion AJ Styles on Raw and Crown Jewel. Carrillo would get his first win on the main roster, teaming with Ricochet and Randy Orton to defeat The O.C. (AJ Styles, Karl Anderson, and Luke Gallows) by pinning Styles. This would earn Carrillo a title shot against Styles but he was attacked by The O.C. before the match. On the December 16 episode of Raw, Carrillo competed in a #1 Contender's Gauntlet match for the United States Championship but was defeated by Andrade after he was unable to continue following a DDT on the concrete floor which would sideline him for several weeks. He would return on the January 20, 2020 episode of Raw saving Rey Mysterio from an attack by Andrade thus setting up a match between Carrillo and Andrade for the United States Championship at the Royal Rumble. However, Andrade was able to retain the title. In a rematch the following night on Raw, Andrade's manager Zelina Vega interfered and got Andrade disqualified, after which Carrillo snapped in a rage, and gave Andrade his own Hammerlock DDT signature move onto the exposed concrete, resulting in Andrade being (kayfabe) written off due to injury.

Following this, Carrillo would begin a feud with his real-life cousin Angel Garza who Vega introduced as her newest protege and proceeded to attack him on the February 3, 2020 episode of Raw. This set up a match between the two at WWE Super ShowDown, where Carillo was defeated by Garza. On the March 2, 2020 episode of Raw, Carrillo teamed with Mysterio to defeat Andrade and Garza where he pinned Andrade, earning himself a United States Championship match at Elimination Chamber. At the event, Carrillo was unsuccessful in capturing the United States Championship from Andrade. On the May 4 episode of Raw, Carrillo participated in a last chance gauntlet match to determine the final competitor in the Money in the Bank ladder match where he entered fifth, defeating Bobby Lashley by disqualification, Angel Garza, and Austin Theory but lost to the returning AJ Styles.

Carrillo then began a feud with Seth Rollins after he injured his friend Rey Mysterio, challenging Rollins's disciple Murphy to a match on the May 18 episode of Raw where Carrillo lost. On the May 25 episode of Raw, Carrillo teamed with Aleister Black where they were defeated by Murphy and Austin Theory after Theory pinned Carrillo. The following week, Carrillo accompanied Black in his match against Rollins where Black was victorious. After the match, Black and Carrillo were attacked by Rollins, Murphy and Theory and both received a Stomp. On the June 29 episode of Raw, Carillo teamed with Aleister Black where they were defeated by Rollins and Murphy. After the match, Rollins and Murphy attacked Carillo and Black, which ended with Rollins performing a Stomp on Carillo onto the steel steps. On the July 27 episode of Raw, Carillo returned and faced Murphy where he was defeated. On the September 21 Raw, Carrillo teamed with Dominik Mysterio and fought Andrade and Angel Garza and Seth Rollins and Murphy in a triple threat tag match for a future Raw Tag Team Championship opportunity but were defeated. Two weeks later on Raw, Carrillo once again teamed with Mysterio and fought Rollins and Murphy in a losing effort. Following this, Carrillo would wrestle exclusively on Main Event for the next several months.

Carrillo returned to television on the April 9, 2021 episode of SmackDown participating in the André the Giant Memorial Battle Royal which he failed to win. On the April 19 episode of Raw, Carrillo accepted Sheamus' open challenge for the United States Championship, however he was viciously attacked by Sheamus before the match began. The following week, he attacked Sheamus as revenge for what the latter previously did to him. Carrillo would face Sheamus once again on the May 10 episode of Raw but ended in referee stoppage after Carrillo injured his knee. On the July 5 episode of Raw, it would be announced that Carrillo would face Sheamus for the United States title on next weeks episode, a match he eventually lost.

==== Los Garza (2021–present) ====
On the September 20 episode of Raw, Carrillo formed a tag team with his cousin Angel Garza, thus turning heel for the first time in his career. The following week on Raw, Carrillo helped Garza defeat Erik using underhanded tactics, cementing his heel turn. As part of the 2021 Draft, both Carrillo and Garza were drafted to the SmackDown brand. On the November 5 episode of SmackDown, the team was named Los Lotharios, with both Carrillo and Garza having shortened their ring names, being billed as Humberto and Angel. As part of the 2023 WWE Draft, Humberto, along with Angel, was drafted to the Raw brand. Humberto, along with Angel, returned on the June 13, 2023 episode of NXT, laying out Axiom and Scrypts. Later in the show, they were interviewed and said that they wanted to join the competition in the NXT tag division as Malik Blade and Edris Enofe, Josh Briggs and Brooks Jensen, and Hank Walker and Tank Ledger brawled in the ring. On July 11, his ring name was reverted to Humberto Carrillo. The following week, Carrillo and Garza made their in-ring return to the brand where they were defeated by Dragon Lee and Nathan Frazer. Following the match, Carrillo and Garza showed dissension by arguing with one another.

Los Lotharios returned to the main roster on the December 22 episode of SmackDown as masked men to assist Santos Escobar defeat Bobby Lashley in the United States Championship #1 Contender Tournament semifinals, aligning with Escobar in the process and changing their tag team to Los Garza. On the January 19, 2024 episode of SmackDown, the newly revived Legado Del Fantasma defeated Latino World Order's Carlito, Joaquin Wilde and Cruz Del Toro in a six-man tag team match. On February 2, Carrillo's ring name was shortened to Berto. On the November 15 episode of SmackDown, United States Champion LA Knight announced an open challenge for the title, which was accepted by Legado Del Fantasma. Knight then gave the title shot to Berto but he failed to win the title.

On June 15, 2025, Los Garza defeated Nueva Generación Dinamita (Sansón and Forastero), The Nemeth Brothers (Nic Nemeth and Ryan Nemeth), and Psycho Clown and Pagano to win the AAA World Tag Team Championship at Triplemanía Regia III. Los Garza lost the titles on August 16 at Triplemanía XXXIII to Pagano and Psycho Clown in a Street Fight, ending their reign at 62 days. On April 24, Santos Escobar departed WWE, leaving Los Garza as a tag team.

On the June 20 episode of Lucha Libre AAA, Los Garza appeared as members of the revival of Los Perros del Mal with Daga, Bronco Nima, and Karmen Petrovic. All members came to the ring and attacked El Grande Americano.

== Other media ==
YouTube

Humberto Carrillo

YouTube information
- Channel: Humberto and Tania
- Years active: 2020–present
- Genre: Vlogging
- Subscribers: 7.09 thousand
- Views: 91.2 thousand
- Last updated: February 6, 2022

On January 31, 2020, Carrillo along with his wife Tania, launched their own YouTube channel.

Video game

Carrillo made his video game debut as a playable character in WWE 2K20 and later appeared in WWE 2K22, WWE 2K23, WWE 2K24, and WWE 2K25 and WWE 2K26.

== Personal life ==
On April 11, 2019, Carrillo got engaged to his girlfriend Tania Ramirez. On July 27, 2019, Carrillo married Ramirez.

Carrillo is the cousin of Angel Garza, the nephew of Héctor Garza, the grandson of Humberto Garza, the son of Humberto Garza Jr., the grandnephew of Mario Segura, the second cousin of Máscara Púrpura, the second cousin of El Ninja Jr. and the cousin of El Sultán.

=== Solano/Segura family tree ===
† = deceased

Humberto Garza †	Unidentified Garza	Mario Segura	Unidentified Garza
Héctor Garza †	Humberto Garza Jr.	Unidentified	Ninja Jr.	Máscara Púrpura
El Sultán	Humberto Carrillo	Angel Garza

== Championships and accomplishments ==
- Casanova Pro/Producciones Casanova
  - PCLL Tag Team Championship (1 time) – with Epidemius
- Llaves y Candados
  - LyC Tag Team Championship (1 time) – with Garza Jr.
  - WWA World Middleweight Championship (1 time)
- Lucha Libre AAA Worldwide
  - AAA World Tag Team Championship (1 time) – with Angel
  - AAA World Trios Championship (1 time, current) – with Angel and Daga
- Pro Wrestling Illustrated
  - Ranked No. 91 of the top 500 singles wrestlers in the PWI 500 in 2020
- The Crash Lucha Libre
  - The Crash Tag Team Championship (1 time) – with Garza Jr.
- WWE
  - WWE Speed Championship #1 Contender Tournament (June 4–18, 2025)
