= Boa (wrestler) =

Chinese professional wrestler (born 1987)

Personal information
- Born: Yanbo Wang; 9 September 1987 (age 39) Beijing, China

Professional wrestling career
- Ring name(s): Boa; Big Boa; Yanbo Wang
- Billed height: 6 ft 4 in (193 cm)
- Billed weight: 225 lb (102 kg)
- Trained by: Robbie Brookside
- Debut: July 8, 2017

Yanbo Wang (born September 9, 1987) (simplified Chinese: 王彦博; traditional Chinese: 王彥博; pinyin: Wáng Yànbó) is a Chinese professional wrestler. He is best known for his tenure in WWE, where he performed under the ring name Boa.

== Professional wrestling career ==
=== WWE (2016–2024) ===
Wang signed with WWE in September 2016 after attending a tryout in Shanghai. Boa's televised debut in NXT took place on July 10, 2019 when he competed in the NXT Breakout Tournament, where the winner but was defeated in the first round by eventual winner Jordan Myles. In November 2019, he suffered a shoulder injury and had undergone surgery.

Beginning on the November 25 episode of NXT, vignettes aired of Boa and Xia Li, teasing an association with the mysterious Mei Yeng. Boa returned on January 6, 2021 during NXT's New Year's Evil special, accompanying Li during her match against Katrina Cortez. He made his in-ring return on the June 29 episode of NXT, teaming with Li to defeat Jake Atlas and Mercedes Martinez in a mixed tag team match. The group of Boa, Li and Yeng was formally known as Tian Sha.

After Tian Sha's dissolution, Boa developed a gimmick where he had been possessed by the spirit of Tian Sha, as he now sported black and white face paint. He entered into a feud with Solo Sikoa after his alter-ego attacked and choked him backstage on the December 28 episode of NXT. On the January 11, 2022, episode of NXT, Boa and Sikoa fought to a double countout. This led to a No Disqualification Falls Count Anywhere match on the January 25 episode of NXT, where Boa lost to Sikoa. Boa went on a year-long hiatus following this loss.

On the April 7, 2023, episode of NXT Level Up, Boa made his in-ring return against Dante Chen in a losing effort. Boa and Chen formed an alliance shortly after. Boa's final match in WWE was on the October 20 episode of NXT Level Up, where he and Chen lost to Edris Enofe and Malik Blade in a tag team match.

After months of inactivity, Boa was released from WWE on May 3, 2024.

== Post-professional wrestling career ==
Wang is currently a car salesman.
