= Raul Mendoza =

Mexican professional wrestler (born 1991)

Personal information
- Born: Raúl Mendoza; November 25, 1991 (age 34) Cosio, Aguascalientes, Mexico

Professional wrestling career
- Ring name(s): Cruz Del Toro; Jinzo; Raul Mendoza; Ronnie Mendoza; Tribal
- Billed height: 178 cm (5 ft 10 in)
- Billed weight: 190 lb (86 kg)
- Billed from: Córdoba, Veracruz
- Trained by: Angel del Futuro; Black Tiger; Gran Apache; El Mexicano; Ricky Marvin; Simba I
- Debut: September 16, 2006

Raúl Mendoza (born November 25, 1991) is a Mexican professional wrestler. As of 2016, he is signed to WWE, where he performs on the Raw brand under the name Cruz Del Toro and is a member of the Latino World Order. He was a founding member of Legado Del Fantasma.

== Professional wrestling career ==
=== Early career (2006-2016) ===
Mendoza made his professional wrestling debut on September 16, 2006. Over the next ten years, Mendoza would primarily compete on the Mexican independent circuit, most notably appearing for independent promotions Desastre Total Ultraviolento (DTU), Perros del Mal (PdM), and the International Wrestling Revolution Group (IWRG), while also appearing for national promotion Lucha Libre AAA Worldwide (AAA) and Japanese promotion Pro Wrestling Noah.

=== WWE (2016–present) ===
==== Cruiserweight Championship pursuit (2016–2020) ====
In June 2016, Mendoza was announced as a participant in the WWE Cruiserweight Classic, a 32-man single-elimination tournament featuring competitors 205 lbs. and under, as a representative from Mexico. Mendoza was eliminated from the tournament in the first round by The Brian Kendrick. Following the Cruiserweight Classic, Mendoza was signed by WWE, who assigned him to compete in the NXT developmental territory. Mendoza made his NXT debut on the May 25, 2017 episode, being defeated by Velveteen Dream. On February 9, 2018, at an NXT live event, Mendoza won a battle royal to become the number one contender to the NXT Championship. The following day on February 10, Mendoza was defeated by NXT Champion Andrade "Cien" Almas. Mendoza made his 205 Live debut on the July 23, 2019 episode of 205 Live, where he teamed with Humberto Carrillo to defeat Kalisto and Gran Metalik. On the November 1 episode of 205 Live, Mendoza unsuccessfully challenged the NXT Cruiserweight Champion Lio Rush.

==== Legado Del Fantasma and Latino World Order (2020–present) ====
On the March 11 episode of NXT, Mendoza was abducted by a group of masked men and thrown into a van in the parking lot in what was originally an interview of Mia Yim. On the April 1 episode of NXT, Joaquin Wilde was similarly abducted during a post-match interview. On the June 10 episode of NXT, Mendoza made his return as he along with Wilde (who was also kidnapped) were revealed as the mysterious masked men and they aligned themselves with Santos Escobar as they attacked Drake Maverick, thus establishing himself as a heel. At night one of The Great American Bash, the trio was named "Legado Del Fantasma". In their first match as a team, Legado del Fantasma defeated Maverick and Breezango in a six-man tag team match on the second night of The Great American Bash.

Wilde and Mendoza would start competing in NXT's tag team division and 205 Live. At NXT TakeOver XXX, Wilde and Mendoza competed against Breezango (Fandango and Tyler Breeze) and the team of Oney Lorcan and Danny Burch in a triple threat match to determine the #1 contenders for the NXT Tag Team Championship but were unsuccessful in winning the match. On night one of Super Tuesday, Legado lost to Isaiah "Swerve" Scott and Breezango in a street fight when Scott pinned Escobar, leading up to a match between Escobar and Scott for Escobar's Cruiserweight Championship at NXT TakeOver 31, where Wilde and Mendoza assisted Escobar in retaining the title.

In 2021, Wilde and Mendoza entered the 2021 Dusty Rhodes Tag Team Classic in which they lost to the eventual winners MSK (Nash Carter and Wes Lee) in the semifinal round. They also faced MSK and Grizzled Young Veterans (James Drake and Zack Gibson) on night one of NXT TakeOver: Stand & Deliver in a match with the Tag Team titles on the line, which MSK won. At NXT Takeover: In Your House, Legado del Fantasma would face NXT North American champion, Bronson Reed and NXT Tag Team champions, MSK in a winners take all, six-man tag team match in which, Legado del Fantasma were unsuccessful in winning the titles. On the August 24 episode of NXT, Elektra Lopez made her debut helping Legado Del Fantasma win against Hit Row. In April 2022 Mendoza's name would be changed to Cruz Del Toro.

On the October 7 episode of SmackDown, Del Toro alongside Wilde and Escobar would join Zelina Vega on the SmackDown brand. On the March 10 episode of Smackdown, Del Toro alongside the rest of Legado Del Fantasma helped Rey Mysterio against The Judgment Day, turning face in the process. On the 31 March episode of SmackDown, Rey reformed the Latino World Order and invited Legado Del Fantasma to join as a token of appreciation for aiding him in his fight against his son, Dominik, and The Judgment Day.

On the November 10 episode of SmackDown, Escobar defected from LWO and removed Vega, Wilde and Del Toro from Legado del Fantasma the following week. Wilde and Del Toro participated in the 2024 Dusty Rhodes Tag Team Classic tournament, defeating Chase University's Duke Hudson and Riley Osborne on the January 16, 2024 episode of NXT but lost to Carmelo Hayes and Trick Williams in the semifinals two weeks later. At Night 2 of the 2024 WWE Draft, LWO were drafted to the Raw brand.

== Other media ==
Mendoza has appeared in WWE SuperCard, WWE 2K22, WWE 2K23 WWE 2K24, WWE 2K25 and WWE 2K26 as a playable character.

== Championships and accomplishments ==
- Desastre Total Ultraviolento
  - DTU Alto Impacto Championship (1 time)
- Pro Wrestling Illustrated
  - Ranked No. 309 of the top 500 singles wrestlers in the PWI 500 in 2016
- Pro Wrestling Noah
  - Noah Wrestling Camp (2014)
- Xtrem Mexican Wrestling
  - XMW International Cup (2012)
