= Elektra Lopez =

American professional wrestler (born 1992)

Personal information
- Born: Karissa Rivera; May 14, 1992 (age 34) Bergen County, New Jersey, U.S.

Professional wrestling career
- Ring name(s): Elektra Lopez; Karissa; Karissa Rivera
- Billed from: San Juan, Puerto Rico
- Trained by: Damian Adams; Sara Del Rey; WWE Performance Center
- Debut: December 10, 2017

Karissa Rivera (born May 14, 1992) is an American professional wrestler currently performing on the independent circuit under her real name. She is best known for her time with WWE, where she performed under the ring name Elektra Lopez and was a member of Legado del Fantasma.

== Early life ==
Rivera was born on May 14, 1992, in Bergen County, New Jersey. She is the daughter of Puerto Rican wrestler José Rivera, who competed in WWE under the ring name Steve King from 1976 to 1984 and died in 1998 when she was young.

== Professional wrestling career ==
=== Ring of Honor (2019) ===
Rivera made her Ring of Honor debut at ROH Road To G1 Supercard - night 4, alongside Gabby Ortiz, where they faced Kris Statlander & Tasha Steelz and Jenny Rose & Sumie Sakai. On the July 27 episode of Ring of Honor Wrestling, she defeated Sumie Sakai. At ROH Mass Hysteria, she faced Tasha Steelz and Angelina Love, but lost. On the August 17 episode of Ring of Honor Wrestling, she was defeated by Women of Honor World Champion Kelly Klein in a non-title match.

=== WWE (2018–2025) ===
Rivera made her debut on the November 14, 2018 episode of NXT, losing to Lacey Evans. She returned the following year on the April 9 episode of SmackDown Live, under the ring name Karissa, competing as one half of "The Brooklyn Belles" with Kris Statlander in a losing effort against then-WWE Women's Tag Team Champions The IIconics. Rivera also appeared as Bobby Lashley's "ex-wife" during an episode of WWE Monday Night Raw. On February 22, 2021, it was reported that Rivera signed with WWE. She made her NXT debut on the June 22 episode of NXT under the name Elektra Lopez in a match against Franky Monet. On the August 24 episode of NXT, Lopez allied herself with Legado Del Fantasma, helping them win against Hit Row, establishing herself as a heel in the process. On the September 28 episode of NXT, Lopez would defeat Hit Row's B-Fab in a no disqualification match. She remained with Legado Del Fantasma until the August 23, 2022 episode of NXT when the stable, except Lopez, left the brand. When LdF was called up to SmackDown, Lopez was replaced by Zelina Vega as the stable's manager.

On the January 3, 2023 episode of NXT, Lopez came out to the ring, joining the altercation between all the wrestlers of the women's division. While that is happening, Roxanne Perez appeared and confirmed that the next week there would be a 20-Women's Battle Royal and the winner will have an opportunity for the NXT Women's Championship at NXT Vengeance Day, The following week, at NXT New Year's Evil, Lopez participated in the 20-Women's Battle Royal for a chance at Perez's NXT Women's Championship at NXT Vengeance Day, eliminating Thea Hail; however, she was eliminated by Nikkita Lyons. She first teamed up with Lola Vice on the April 14 episode of NXT Level Up, losing to Katana Chance and Kayden Carter. On the June 13 episode of NXT, Vice officially allied herself with Lopez. Their alliance ended on the January 16, 2024 edition of NXT when Vice eliminated her from a No.1 contenders battle royal and the two then fought to the back. On the January 23 episode of NXT, Lopez confronted Vice during a Supernova Sessions segment and proceeded to attack her, and thus setting up a match for the following week. On the January 26, 2024 episode of SmackDown, Lopez interfered in a match between Santos Escobar and Carlito, helping Escobar pick up the win and re-joining Legado del Fantasma in the process. On the January 30, 2024 episode of NXT, Lopez lost to Vice, which was Lopez's final match and appearance in NXT. On February 7, 2025, Lopez was released from WWE.

=== Independent circuit (2025–present) ===
On June 7, 2025, Rivera made her return to the indies, where she faced Deonna Purrazzo during a House of Glory (HOG) event in a losing effort.

== Championships and accomplishments ==
- World Xtreme Wrestling C4
  - WXW Diamond Division Championship (1 time)
- Wrestling Superstar
  - WS Women's Championship (1 time)
