= Noche de Los Grandes =

2026 AAA professional wrestling event

- Promotional poster featuring El Grande Americano and "The Original" El Grande Americano
- Promotion(s): Lucha Libre AAA Worldwide; WWE (Note: WWE handled the production of this event.)
- Date: May 30, 2026 (Aired May 30 – June 6, 2026)
- City: Monterrey, Nuevo León, Mexico
- Venue: Arena Monterrey
- Attendance: 12,000+ (sold out)

Event chronology
← Previous; Rey de Reyes	Next → Verano de Escándalo

Noche de Los Grandes (Spanish for "Night of the Greats") was a professional wrestling livestreaming and television special event produced by Mexican professional wrestling promotion Lucha Libre AAA Worldwide (AAA), in partnership with its parent company WWE. The event took place on Saturday, May 30, 2026, at Arena Monterrey in Monterrey, Nuevo León, Mexico. It aired as a two-week event, every Saturday on episodes of Lucha Libre AAA from May 30 to June 6.

Six matches were contested at the event. In the main event of the event's Week 1 broadcast, El Grande Americano defeated "The Original" El Grande Americano in a No Disqualification Mask vs. Mask match, after which "Original" Americano unmasked to reveal himself as Chad Gable. In other prominent matches, Rey Fénix defeated Laredo Kid to become the new AAA World Cruiserweight Champion, El Hijo del Vikingo defeated El Hijo de Dr. Wagner Jr. to become the new AAA Latin American Champion, and The War Raiders (Erik and Ivar) defeated Pagano and Psycho Clown to become the new AAA World Tag Team Champions.

The live broadcast of Week 1 peaked at over 300,000 concurrent viewers across its simultaneous English and Spanish feeds on YouTube. El Grande Americano versus "The Original" El Grande Americano received near universal high praise from both critics and fans. Dave Meltzer of the Wrestling Observer Newsletter called it the best AAA match he had ever seen and rated the match 5 3/4 stars, making it the highest-rated match produced by WWE in history. Several critics deemed it a contender for match of the year, with one critic calling it a masterpiece.

== Production ==
=== Background ===
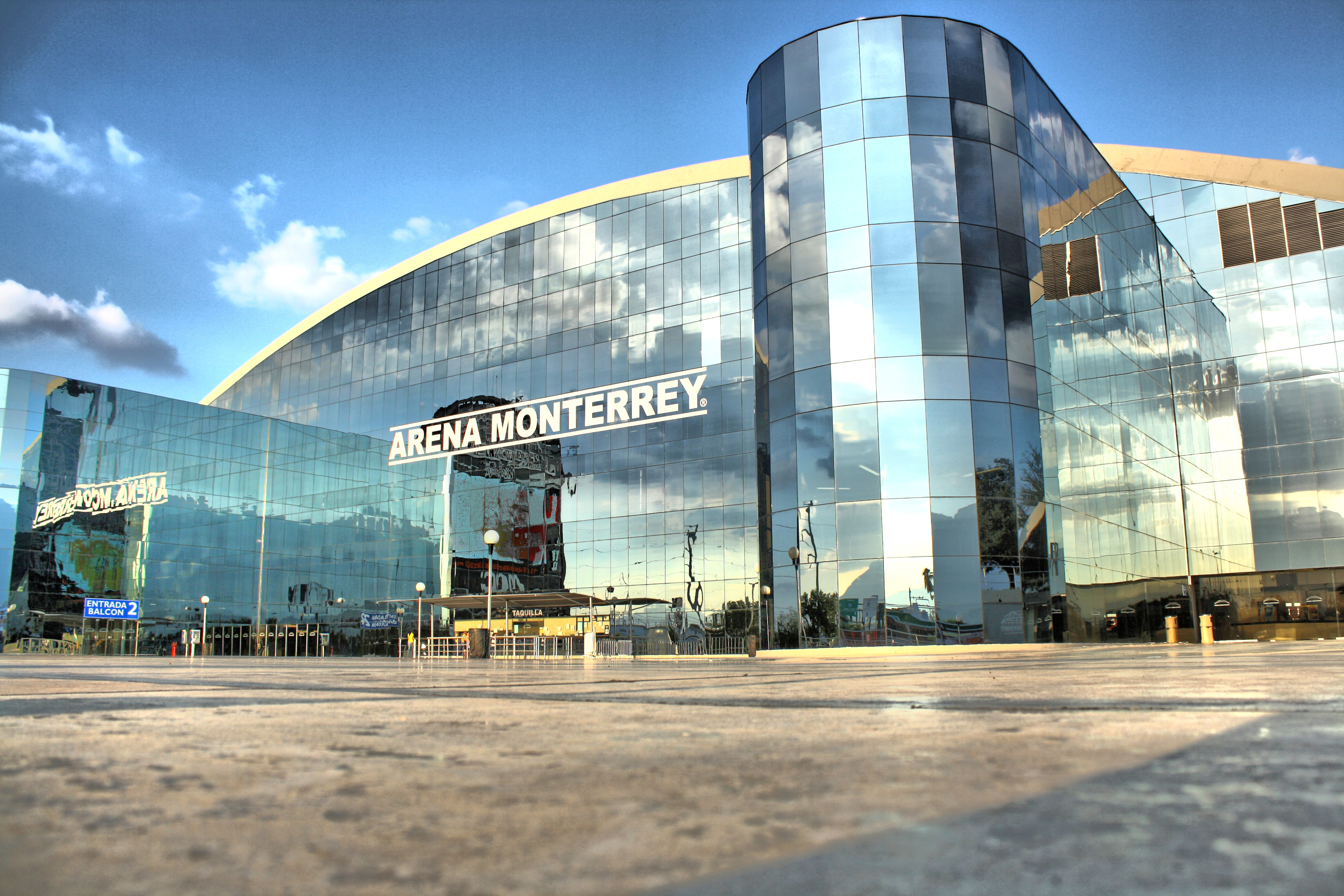
Noche de Los Grandes took place at Arena Monterrey in Monterrey, Nuevo León, Mexico.

At Rey de Reyes on March 14, 2026, AAA announced the "Noche de Los Grandes" event on Saturday, May 30, in Monterrey, Nuevo León, Mexico at Arena Monterrey. The event aired as a special episode of Lucha Libre AAA, the promotion's weekly Saturday television show. During the May 23 episode of Lucha Libre AAA, AAA updated the schedule, announcing that Noche de Los Grandes would instead air as a two-part event across consecutive Saturdays from May 30 to June 6.

=== Broadcast outlets ===
As part of the media rights agreement with Fox in Latin America that was announced on November 25, 2025, Noche de Los Grandes aired live across Fox platforms in Latin America. The event was livestreamed on WWE and AAA's YouTube channels and Facebook pages outside of Latin America.

=== Storylines ===
The event featured professional wrestling matches that involve wrestlers from scripted feuds. The wrestlers portrayed either heels (referred to as rudos in Mexico, those that play the part of the "bad guys") or faces (técnicos in Mexico, the "good guy" characters) as they perform.

==== Mask vs. Mask match ====
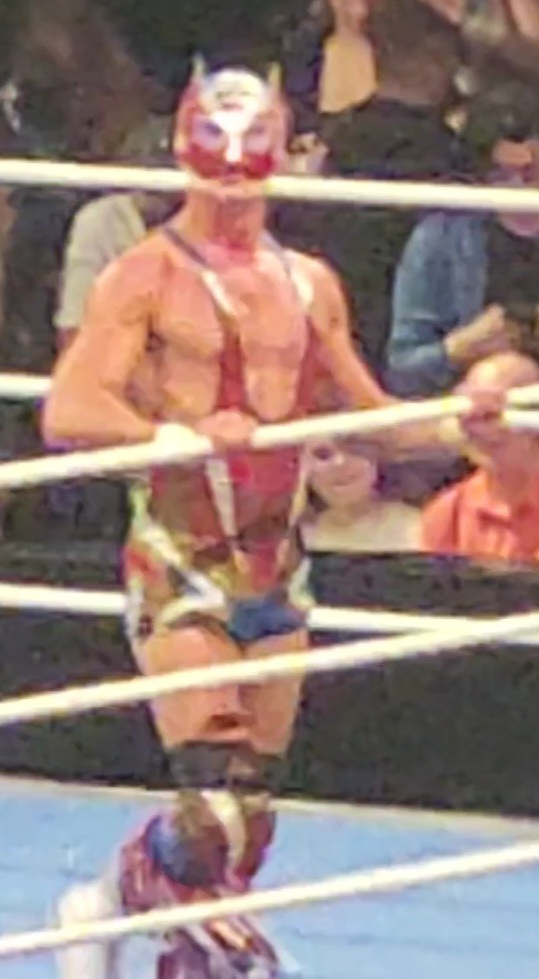
El Grande Americano (pictured) and "The Original" El Grande Americano (not pictured) fought to keep their mask in a No Disqualification Mask vs. Mask match.

Following a series of losses to various luchadores, Chad Gable took a kayfabe sabbatical on the January 20, 2025, episode of WWE Raw to address his "lucha libre problems". On the March 10 episode, an unidentified luchador—bearing the branding of Gable's American Made faction—attacked Rey Mysterio. Gable denied any connection to the unidentified luchador, who was later named "El Grande Americano" in a victorious in-ring debut against Dragon Lee. The character initially drew significant criticism from Mexican audiences, who viewed the gimmick as a mockery of national wrestling traditions. A match between Mysterio and Americano was scheduled for WrestleMania 41 after Americano mocked the traditions of lucha libre. On the WrestleMania SmackDown special on April 18, Rey Fénix eliminated Gable from the André the Giant Memorial Battle Royal, only to be eliminated himself when Americano interfered. Later that same night, Mysterio was sidelined after suffering a torn groin. Fénix replaced Mysterio at WrestleMania 41, where he lost against Americano. Two months later, Gable was sidelined with a legitimate rotator cuff injury.

WWE Raw General Manager Adam Pearce assumed that Americano would not appear while Gable was recovering from his injury; Ludwig Kaiser was noticeably in the background, observing their conversation. During Gable's recovery, Americano continued to appear, surprising American Made and expanding his presence into Lucha Libre AAA Worldwide (AAA). He eventually formed the Los Americanos stable alongside Rayo Americano and Bravo Americano. At Triplemanía XXXIII on August 16, Grande Americano challenged for the AAA Mega Championship in a four-way match; despite losing the match, he began to win over the Mexican audience by performing "Cielito Lindo" during his entrance.

At the Royal Rumble on January 31, 2026, Grande Americano entered the Men's Royal Rumble match at number 12, only to be eliminated by "The Original" El Grande Americano, who entered at 13. "Original" Americano would then attack and replace Grande Americano in the Rey de Reyes tournament qualifiers on the February 7 episode of Lucha Libre AAA, ultimately advancing to the finals. On the February 28 episode, Grande Americano accused "Original" Americano of being an impostor who utilized artificial intelligence to simulate his Spanish-speaking abilities. Pimpinela Escarlata confronted "Original" Americano regarding these claims, which resulted in Escarlata being assaulted and rendered unable to compete in that night’s tournament qualifier. Upon Escarlata’s request, Grande Americano served as his replacement, winning the match to secure the third spot in the Rey de Reyes tournament final. On March 14 at Week 1 of Rey de Reyes, Grande Americano won the tournament after handcuffing "Original" Americano to a crowd railing, earning the ceremonial sword and a future AAA Mega Championship opportunity. On March 21 at Week 2 of Rey de Reyes, "Original" Americano ambushed Grande Americano during his victory speech, unsuccessfully attempting to unmask him but successfully stealing the ceremonial sword. Consequently, Grande Americano challenged "Original" Americano to a Mask vs. Mask match. On April 14, AAA Executive Producer The Undertaker officially sanctioned the bout for Noche de Los Grandes.

At their contract signing on the May 2 episode of Lucha Libre AAA, Dorian Roldán—son of AAA President Marisela Peña—read a letter from "Original" Americano's attorney, stating a mandate that any physical altercation between the two prior to the event would result in the aggressor automatically forfeiting their mask. Additionally, a clause was included requiring the removal of AAA interviewer and Grande Americano's girlfriend Andrea Bazarte from the promotion. Despite his visible frustration with the terms, Grande Americano signed the agreement alongside his opponent. "Original" Americano then exited the ring, leaving Grande Americano vulnerable to an ambush by The Creed Brothers (Julius Creed and Brutus Creed), who draped him in the American flag before fleeing the ring when Rayo and Bravo arrived. On the May 4 episode of Raw, Grande Americano revealed that the "no physical altercation" clause only applied in Mexico as Los Americanos was scheduled to face "Original Americano" and two luchadores named Los Americanos Hermanos (Julio Credo and Bruto Credo) in a trios match with the latter gaining the victory. On the May 11 episode, "Original" Americano challenged Dominik Mysterio for the AAA Mega Championship but ultimately failed due to a distraction by Grande Americano. On the May 23 episode of Lucha Libre AAA, Grande Americano and "Original" Americano engaged in a physical altercation, prompting the AAA locker room and security personnel to intervene and separate them. Despite a contract clause strictly forbidding physical contact between the two luchadores prior to their bout, newly appointed AAA General Manager Rey Mysterio upheld their scheduled match for Noche de Los Grandes.

==== Other matches ====
On the May 2 episode of Lucha Libre AAA, Dorian Roldán, the manager of the El Ojo stable, announced that El Hijo de Dr. Wagner Jr. would defend the AAA Latin American Championship against El Ojo member El Hijo del Vikingo at Noche de Los Grandes. Later that evening, El Hijo del Vikingo competed in a match against Mini Vikingo. While the referee was inadvertently knocked out after Mini Vikingo was thrown into him, Hijo del Vikingo attempted to use a steel chair, but was thwarted by Wagner Jr., who proceeded to slam Hijo del Vikingo onto the steel chair, which allowed Mini Vikingo to secure the victory. Following the match, Hijo del Vikingo's stablemate Omos attacked Wagner Jr. and Mini Vikingo. As Omos prepared to execute an attack on Wagner Jr., he was intercepted by Wagner Jr.'s brother, Galeno, who utilized a steel chair to force Omos to flee the ring.

At Week 2 of Rey de Reyes, AAA World Tag Team Champions Pagano and Psycho Clown defended their titles against the War Raiders (Erik and Ivar), ending in a no contest after all four competitors disregarded the referee's instructions as they brawled. On the April 18 episode of Lucha Libre AAA, Ivar defeated Clown following outside interference by Erik. Pagano did not intervene until after the match, prompting an argument between the champions. Following the altercation, Psycho discovered his Los Psycho Circus stablemate, Murder Clown, unconscious backstage alongside a bandana. Psycho confronted Pagano on the May 9 episode, suspecting Pagano was involved in the assaults against the stable. This followed two previous ambushes: one on Panic Clown during Pagano and Psycho Clown's title defense on January 24, and another on Dave the Clown when he was separated from the group on February 14. Pagano denied the allegations, though Psycho rejected his subsequent offer of reconciliation. As Psycho was heading backstage, he was blindsided by the War Raiders. After initial hesitation, Pagano intervened to assist his partner and repel the attack. Although Psycho thanked him, Pagano dismissed the gesture. The following week, a rematch between Pagano and Psycho against the War Raiders for the AAA World Tag Team Championship was officially scheduled for Noche de Los Grandes.

At Week 1 of Rey de Reyes, the debuting Bayley answered Flammer's open challenge for the AAA Reina de Reinas Championship but failed to win the title due to outside interference from Flammer's Las Tóxicas stablemates, La Hiedra and Maravilla. On the April 11 episode of Lucha Libre AAA, Las Tóxicas celebrated Flammer's 974th day as champion, during which she declared that she had defeated all viable contenders and that her reign would continue indefinitely. They were then confronted by the debuting La Catalina, who challenged Flammer's assertions by noting that they had never wrestled each other, resulting in a physical altercation between Catalina and Las Tóxicas. On the May 9 episode, Catalina won her AAA in-ring debut against Jessy Jackson, after which she was attacked by Las Tóxicas. Bayley and AAA World Mixed Tag Team Champion Lola Vice intervened to repel the assault and assist Catalina. The following week, a Relevos Australianos pitting Catalina, Vice, and Bayley against Las Tóxicas was officially scheduled for Noche de Los Grandes.

On the May 2 episode of Lucha Libre AAA, Rey Fénix defeated AAA World Cruiserweight Champion Laredo Kid in a non-title bout. Three weeks later, Fénix challenged Kid for the championship, but failed to win after Kid struck Fénix's groin while the referee was distracted, which gave Kid the advantage to secure the pinfall and retain his title. Later that night, the new AAA General Manager Rey Mysterio announced that a rematch was set for Noche de Los Grandes.

On May 30, AAA announced a fatal five-way match featuring Cruz Del Toro, Joaquin Wilde, Lince Dorado, Mini Vikingo, and Octagón Jr. on the second week of Noche de Los Grandes.

== Events ==
=== Week 1 ===
Other on-screen personnel
Role	Name
Commentators	José Manuel Guillén
Commentators	Roberto Figueroa
English commentators	Corey Graves
English commentators	John "Bradshaw" Layfield
English commentators	Rey Mysterio
Ring announcer	Jesús Zuñiga
Referees	El Hijo del Tirantes
Referees	Suavecito
Referees	Adrian Butler

==== Preliminary matches ====
The event opened with Laredo Kid defending the AAA Cruiserweight Championship against Rey Fénix, who immediately attacked Kid after the opening bell. Kid later tried to hit Fénix's groin, but Fénix blocked it. While the referee was out of position, Kid successfully struck Fénix's groin. After Kid later collided with the exposed steel of a turnbuckle, Fénix delivered the "Mexican Muscle Buster", slamming his opponent upside down from his shoulders to secure the pinfall victory and win the AAA World Cruiserweight Championship.

Next, El Hijo del Dr. Wagner Jr. defended the AAA Latin American Championship against El Hijo del Vikingo, who was accompanied by his manager Dorian Roldán. Later in the match, Vikingo's El Ojo stablemate Omos arrived at ringside and tripped Wagner Jr., which allowed Vikingo to attack Wagner Jr. Galeno, Wagner Jr.'s brother, then came to ringside to brawl with Omos. As Galeno attacked Omos with a steel chair, Mini Vikingo entered the ring and attacked Hijo del Vikingo. Omos later punched Wagner Jr., which allowed Hijo del Vikingo to execute a 630° splash on Wagner Jr., performing a 630° front somersault off the top rope to a supine Wagner Jr. Hijo del Vikingo then won the title via pinfall.

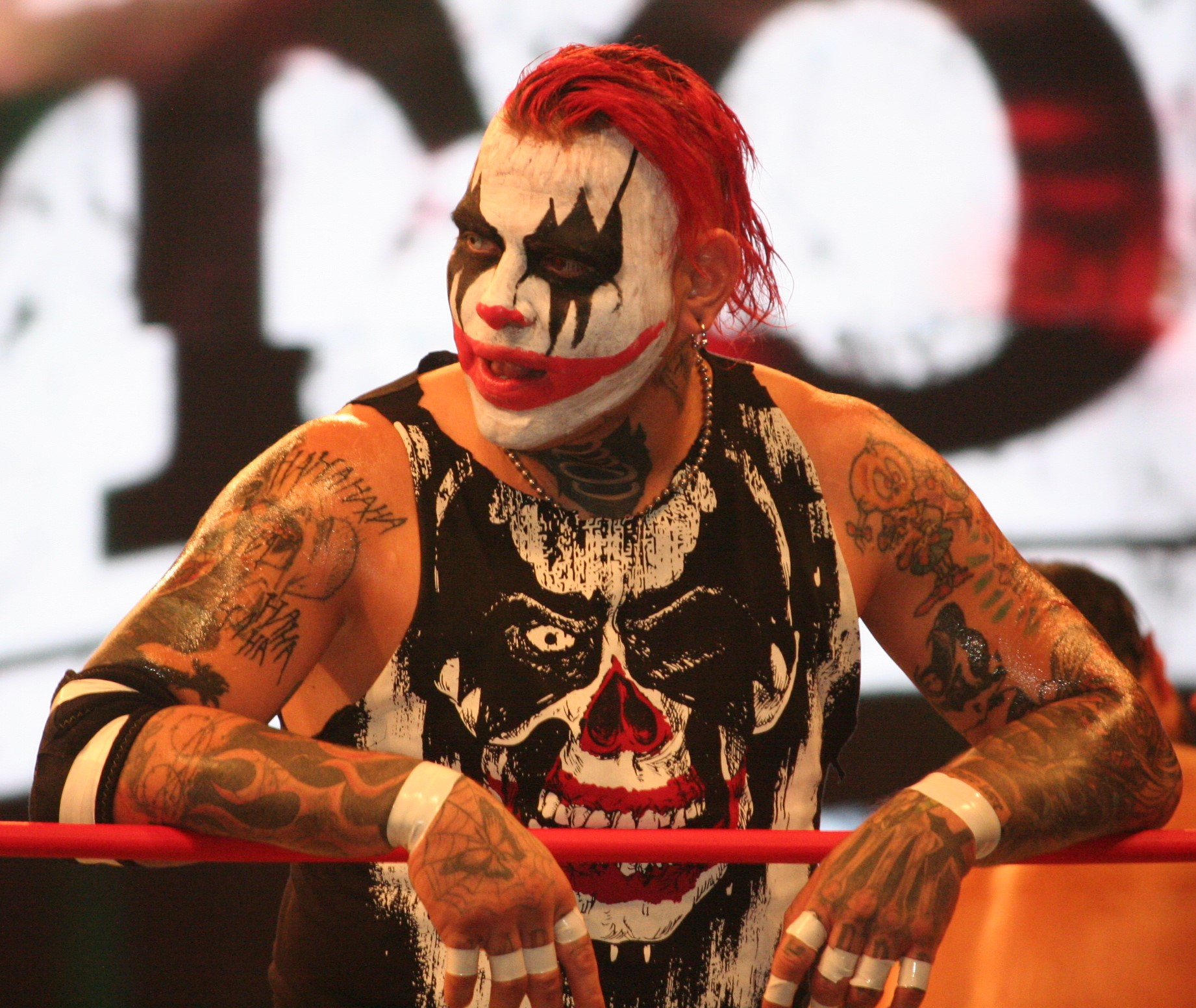
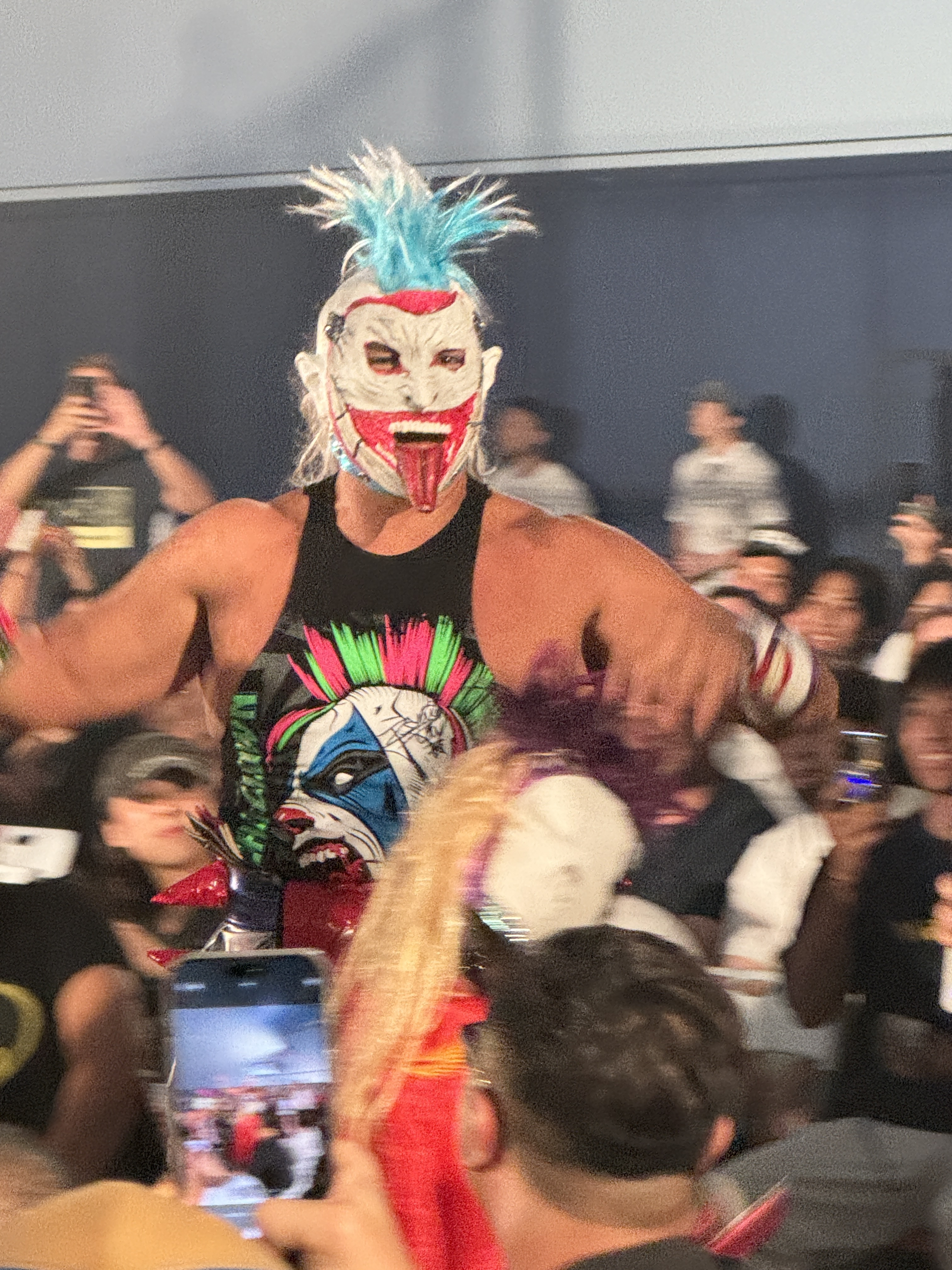
After months of frustration at each other, former AAA World Tag Team Champions Pagano and Psycho Clown finally severed ties.

In the penultimate match, Pagano and Psycho Clown defended the AAA World Tag Team Championship against the War Raiders (Erik and Ivar). Late into the match, Pagano unintentionally kicked Ivar into Clown, and then Pagano unintentionally hit Clown's neck. After the War Raiders pushed Pagano to the outside, Ivar hit Clown with a powerslam, slamming Clown down as he landed on top of Clown, before getting the pinfall and winning the AAA World Tag Team Championship. After the match, Pagano and Clown had an argument and began shoving each other. After Pagano walked away, the War Raiders attacked Clown as Pagano briefly watched the attack before continuing to head backstage.

==== Main event ====
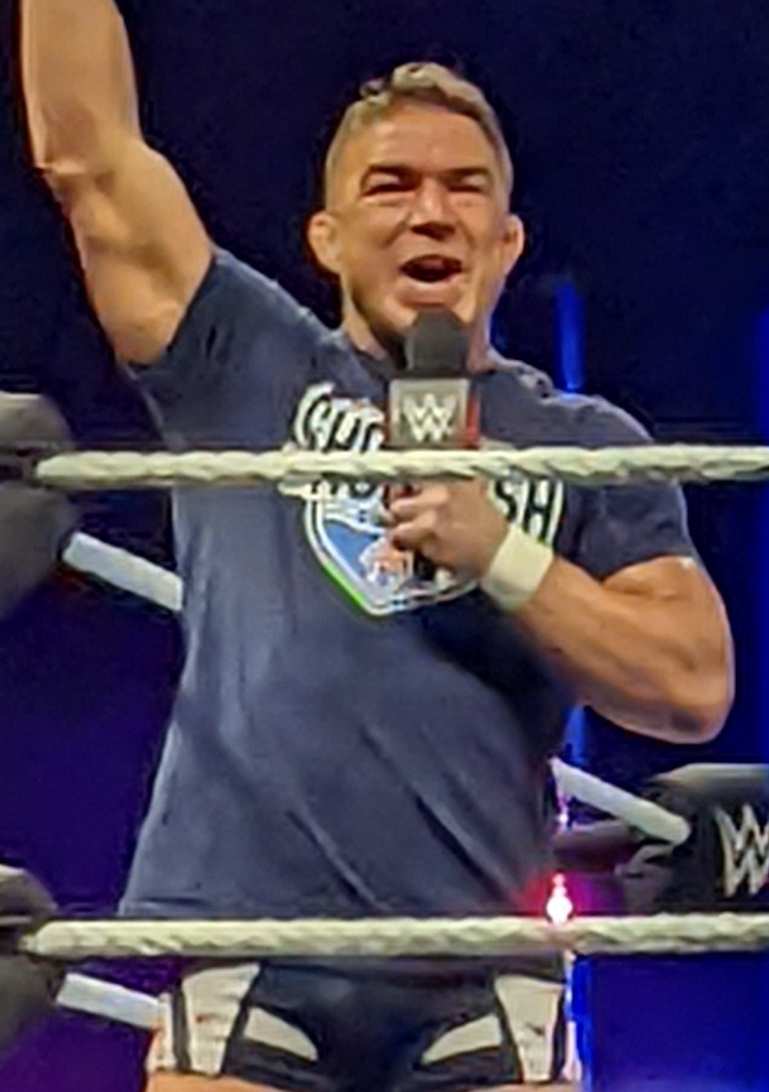
"The Original" El Grande Americano was officially revealed to be Chad Gable.

The main event of Week 1 was the No Disqualification Mask vs. Mask match between El Grande Americano and "The Original" El Grande Americano, where the use of weapons and outside interferences were allowed, and the loser was forced to lose their mask. As the match progressed, "Original" Americano began tearing Grande Americano's mask. Grande Americano responded by jumping off the ring apron and slamming Gable through a table. "Original" Americano later repeatedly punched Grande Americano's eye as Grande Americano began to bleed. Grande Americano retaliated by tearing up "Original" Americano's mask. Los Americanos Hermanos (Bruto Credo and Julio Credo) later saved "Original" Americano by pulling Grande Americano to ringside and slamming him through the announce table. Los Americanos (Rayo Americano and Bravo Americano) came out to brawl with Los Americanos Hermanos. Bravo then dove 15–20 feet off the risers onto Rayo and Los Americanos Hermanos.

"Original" Americano attempted to grab a comedian, who he previously insulted, from the front row, which prompted the comedian to hit him. Pimpinela Escarlata then hit "Original" Americano's head with a guitar. As "Original" Americano was attacking Grande Americano with a bullrope, Andrea Bazarte – Grande Americano's girlfriend – came down to the front row. "Original" Americano then confronted her, but she showed her ticket as a paying audience member. Grande Americano then attacked "Original" Americano with the bullrope. "Original" Americano charged at Grande Americano, but he hit the ring post shoulder-first instead; his arm began to bleed. Grande Americano then connected with a running headbutt to get the pinfall victory.

After losing the match, "Original" Americano was forced to remove his mask. Joined by his family, he stated that he originally adopted the mask to understand lucha libre to beat the luchadores he disliked but ultimately learned and respected Mexican culture and lucha libre. He further stated that he could not surpass the "Mexican spirit". He removed his mask and officially revealed his true identity as Chad Gable. He introduced himself and his family to the crowd and acknowledged Grande Americano as the only true El Grande Americano. He then handed his mask over to Grande Americano and made a promise for a future appearance in AAA.

=== Week 2 ===
Other on-screen personnel
Role	Name
Commentators	José Manuel Guillén
Commentators	Roberto Figueroa
English commentators	Corey Graves
English commentators	John "Bradshaw" Layfield
English commentators	Rey Mysterio
Ring announcer	Jesús Zuñiga
Referees	El Hijo del Tirantes
Referees	El Piero

==== Preliminary match ====
Week 2 opened with Lince Dorado, Octagón Jr., Mini Vikingo, and Latino World Order members Joaquin Wilde and Cruz Del Toro fighting for a shot at the AAA World Cruiserweight Championship in a fatal five-way match. Wilde and Del Toro worked together early, but they eventually began fighting each other, which allowed Dorado to hit them with a double "Lethal Injection", bouncing off the ropes before grabbing their heads and pulling them down face-first. He later hit Wilde with a "Shooting Star Press", backflipping off the top rope before landing on a supine Wilde, for the pinfall victory. (Note: During his match, Octagón Jr. suffered a legitimate neck injury after taking a DDT from the top rope. He was subsequently pulled from the match and taken backstage. This did not air during the broadcast.)

==== Main event ====
The main event was Bayley, La Catalina, and Lola Vice versus Las Tóxicas (Flammer, La Hiedra, and Maravilla). When Bayley tagged in Catalina after surviving an assault in Las Tóxicas' corner, Catalina hit Flammer with a moonsault, backflipping off the top rope and landing on a supine Flammer. Catalina attempted a pinfall, but Hiedra and Maravilla saved Flammer. All six competitors brawled, which ended with Catalina charging at Flammer with a knee strike. Catalina then pinned Flammer to get the victory for her team.

== Reception ==
AAA English commentator Corey Graves announced that the event was sold out with over 12,000 people in attendance. During the live broadcast of Week 1 of the event, Noche de Los Grandes peaked at over 300,000 concurrent live viewers across its simultaneous English and Spanish language feeds on YouTube. As of June 2, 2026, Week 1 of Noche de Los Grandes garnered a total of 2.24 million views across the WWE and Lucha Libre AAA YouTube channels.

=== Critical reception ===
Professional ratings
Publication		Week 1					Week 2			Ref.
Publication		Matches				Overall	Matches		Overall	Ref.
Publication		1	2	3	4	Overall	1	2	Overall	Ref.
411Mania	Steve Cook	3/5 stars	2/5 stars	2/5 stars	4.5/5 stars	8.0/10	2.5/5 stars	2.5/5 stars	6.7/10	
411Mania	Thomas Hall	B	B–	B–	A–	9.0/10	B–	C+	7.0/10	
Bleacher Report		B+	C+	C+	A+	A	—N/a		—N/a	
False Finish		4.25/5	3.5/5	2.75/5	6/5	A–	—N/a		—N/a	
Súper Luchas		5/5 stars	3.5/5 stars	2.5/5 stars	5/5 stars	—N/a	3/5 stars	3/5 stars	—N/a	
TJR Wrestling		—N/a			5/5 stars	—N/a	—N/a		—N/a	
Wrestling Observer Newsletter		4.25/5	3/5	2/5	5.75/5	—N/a	—N/a		—N/a	
Match order: Week 1; 1. Laredo Kid (c) vs. Rey Fénix for the AAA World Cruiserweight Championship; 2. El Hijo de Dr. Wagner Jr. (c) vs. El Hijo del Vikingo for the AAA Latin American Championship; 3. Pagano and Psycho Clown (c) vs. The War Raiders (Erik and Ivar) for the AAA World Tag Team Championship; 4. El Grande Americano vs. "The Original" El Grande Americano in a No Disqualification Lucha de Apuestas Máscara contra Máscara match; Week 2; 1. Cruz Del Toro vs. Joaquin Wilde vs. Lince Dorado vs. Mini Vikingo vs. Octagón Jr. in a Fatal five-way match to determine the #1 contender to the AAA World Cruiserweight Championship; 2. Bayley, La Catalina, and Lola Vice vs. Las Tóxicas (Flammer, La Hiedra, and Maravilla)

==== Week 1 ====
John Pollock of Post Wrestling called Week 1 of Noche de Los Grandes AAA's "highest peak" since being acquired by WWE the previous year, while Erik Beaston of Bleacher Report stated that it backed up AAA's reputation as WWE's best weekly show. Aurelio Torres of False Finish called it one of AAA's strongest events of the year, praising the crowd and noting that the "masterpiece" of a main event and strong opener ensured the show would be remembered for years despite the flat undercard. Brandon Hoffman of The Pop Break also deemed it a major success, comparing the loud crowd to that of WWE's Money in the Bank event in 2011. Thomas Hall of 411Mania said that it was "every bit of the hype you could have wanted" and urged non-AAA viewers to watch. However, Steve Cook of 411Mania found it "tricky" to rate due to his dislike of the undercard, ultimately defining it as a "one match show".

Beaston characterized the AAA World Cruiserweight Championship match as an "extraordinary opener" and praised Rey Fénix and Laredo Kid's chemistry. Hall said that the match told a "classic story" of a challenger built up to dethrone a longtime champion. Torres lauded the "relentless" pacing and high investment from the crowd, arguing that Fénix's title win was the correct decision. Ernesto Ocampo of Súper Luchas called it the "best fight of the series". Cook reasoned that Fénix needed the victory, noting his few accomplishments in WWE compared to his brother, Penta.

David Miller of Pro Wrestling Torch noted that while the outcome of the AAA Latin American Championship match was unsurprising, the wrestling was "very good". Torres said that the title change felt right. Beaston called it a "fine showcase", arguing that the interferences fit the story. Ocampo noted that the outside interferences were well-integrated into the narrative. Hall stated that the chaos created a good story, adding that the new champion needed the victory since El Hijo de Dr. Wagner Jr. did not do much as champion. Conversely, Hoffman argued that the match failed to be competitive because of the constant interferences. Cook admitted he was not a "huge fan" of the match, stating that Wagner Jr. and Galeno did not look "great".

Hall noted that the AAA World Tag Team Championship match served its purpose by establishing the War Raiders as "monsters" and moving the feud between Pagano and Psycho Clown forward. Beaston described it as a "palate cleanser"; while acknowledging that it was "not the prettiest", Beaston highlighted the crowd's passionate reaction to Pagano walking out on Clown. Miller was more positive, calling it a "hard-hitting affair" that made the War Raiders look good. However, Torres labeled it the "weakest match on the card", pointing out the lack of chemistry, though he still praised the War Raiders' title victory. Hoffman called the encounter "severely underwhelming" and the "lowest point of the night".

El Grande Americano versus "The Original" El Grande Americano received near universal high praise from both critics and fans. Dave Meltzer of the Wrestling Observer Newsletter rated the match 5 3/4 stars, making it the highest-rated match produced by WWE and AAA in history; he called it the best AAA match he had ever seen, noting homages to Cavernario Galindo and Rayo de Jalisco Jr. versus Cien Caras at Empresa Mexicana de Lucha Libre's 57th Anniversary Show. Miller labeled it a "match for the ages" and a mandatory watch for every professional wrestler. Pollock observed that what had originally started as a joke ended up as an all-time classic worthy of a year-end award. Cook noted that the match established Grande Americano as a "made man in AAA" while raising Chad Gable’s value in WWE. Hall stated that the match lived up to its hype and made Grande Americano look like an "absolute hero" in AAA's biggest match under the WWE banner. Beaston described the bout as "pure cinema" and a career-defining contender for the match of the year, commending Ludwig Kaiser (the wrestler under the El Grande Americano mask) for fully committing to the gimmick and becoming a "cultural hero" in Mexico. Torres lauded the match as a masterpiece of emotional storytelling comparable to a "carefully structured film", stating that the meaningful use of blood, sensible interferences, and respect for lucha libre delivered "genuine emotion" that he had never experienced before in 27 years of watching wrestling. Hoffman compared it to Daniel Bryan's WrestleMania XXX storyline, praising Kaiser’s connection to the crowd and Chad Gable's work as a detestable villain. John Canton of TJR Wrestling loved the entire presentation, explaining that the blood and outside interferences fit the intense, personal nature of the feud and kept the loud crowd captivated. Rick Ucchino of Sports Illustrated noted the match proved that predictable outcomes do not ruin great stories, admitting that the "hero's ovation" Grande Americano received in Mexico proved that scheduling the match for Noche de Los Grandes instead of WrestleMania 42 was the correct decision.

==== Week 2 ====
Hall observed that while Week 2 of Noche de Los Grandes was a "fine show", nothing on the card stood out enough to justify being a television special. Cook questioned the division of matches for the multi-week broadcast, suggesting that the event's six matches should have been split more equally across both weeks. Miller felt the second week suffered from having to follow up on the previous week's Mask vs. Mask match.

Hall praised the decision to give the victory to Lince Dorado in the fatal five-way match, stating that he was well-suited to serve as the first challenger for the new champion. Miller was particularly impressed by 17-year-old Mini Vikingo in his first time watching Vikingo perform, remarking that Vikingo competed with the experience of a 27-year-old wrestler.

Miller characterized the six-woman tag team match as a "perfectly fine" showcase for AAA's newly acquired talent, La Catalina. Hall noted that its lone notable moment was Catalina pinning AAA Reina de Reinas Champion Flammer, which he felt set up a future title match.

== Aftermath ==
On the following episodes of WWE SmackDown and WWE Raw, Chad Gable sought forgiveness from several luchadores, including Rey Fénix, Penta, Rey Mysterio, and Dragon Lee. Following Penta's successful defense of the WWE Intercontinental Championship against Mysterio, Ethan Page and Rusev launched an attack, with Lee unsuccessfully attempting to aid Penta and Mysterio. After Rusev tore off Mysterio's mask, Penta helped him conceal his identity while Page and Rusev continued their assault. Gable then made a triumphant save and returned the mask. On the July 13 episode of Raw, Gable was victorious in a seven-man gauntlet match to earn a WWE Intercontinental Championship match against Penta at WWE SummerSlam in Gable's hometown of Minneapolis. Gable would go on to defeat Penta at SummerSlam to win the title.

La Catalina continued to feud with Las Tóxicas (AAA Reina de Reinas Champion Flammer, La Hiedra, and Maravilla) in the following weeks, preventing Hiedra from winning the AAA World Mixed Tag Team Championship and the NXT Women's Championship and Flammer from using a weapon against Lady Shani in a non-title match that resulted in a loss. On the July 11 episode of Lucha Libre AAA, AAA General Manager Rey Mysterio announced that Flammer was scheduled to defend the AAA Reina de Reinas Championship against Catalina and Shani in a triple threat match at Verano de Escándalo, where Flammer successfully retained her title. However, Catalina's quest to become the AAA Reina de Reinas Champion persisted as she won a five-woman gauntlet match at Ola de Calor to earn the right to challenge Flammer for the title at Triplemanía 34. On September 13 at Night 2 of Triplemanía 34, Catalina defeated Flammer to win the AAA Reina de Reinas Championship and end Flammer's record-setting 1,128-day reign.

On the June 20 episode of Lucha Libre AAA, Rey Fénix successfully defended the AAA World Cruiserweight Championship in a triple threat match against former champion Laredo Kid and number one contender Lince Dorado.

On June 26, the autographed mask El Grande Americano wore at Noche de Los Grandes was sold in an auction for US$50,035 with all net proceeds donated to the Dr. Sonrisas Foundation to support children with life-threatening health conditions.

== Results ==
Week 1 (May 30)
No.	Results	Stipulations	Times
1	Rey Fénix defeated Laredo Kid (c) by pinfall	Singles match for the AAA World Cruiserweight Championship	11:51
2	El Hijo del Vikingo (with Dorian Roldán) defeated El Hijo de Dr. Wagner Jr. (c) by pinfall	Singles match for the AAA Latin American Championship	7:18
3	The War Raiders (Erik and Ivar) defeated Pagano and Psycho Clown (c) by pinfall	Tag team match for the AAA World Tag Team Championship	9:11
4	El Grande Americano defeated "The Original" El Grande Americano by pinfall	No Disqualification Mask vs. Mask match	33:22
(c) / – the champion(s) heading into the match

Week 2 (June 6)
No.	Results	Stipulations	Times
1	Lince Dorado defeated Cruz Del Toro, Joaquin Wilde, Mini Vikingo, and Octagón Jr. by pinfall	Fatal five-way match to determine the number one contender to the AAA World Cruiserweight Championship	7:33
2	Bayley, La Catalina, and Lola Vice defeated Las Tóxicas (Flammer, La Hiedra, and Maravilla) by pinfall	Lucha de Relevos Australianos	8:35
