= Erik (wrestler) =

American professional wrestler (born 1984)

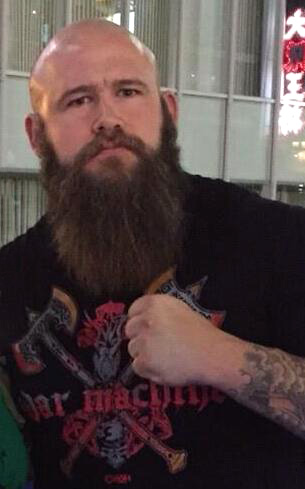
- Erik in 2015

Personal information
- Born: Raymond Rowe; August 21, 1984 (age 42) Cleveland, Ohio, U.S.
- Spouse: Sarah Logan (m. 2018)
- Children: 3

Professional wrestling career
- Ring name(s): Erik; Raymond Right; Ray Rowe; Raymond Rowe; Rowe
- Billed height: 6 ft 1 in (185 cm)
- Billed weight: 247 lb (112 kg)
- Billed from: Cleveland, Ohio
- Trained by: Josh Prohibition; Lou Marconi; WWE Performance Center
- Debut: May 2003

Raymond Rowe (born August 21, 1984) is an American professional wrestler. As of January 2018, he is signed to WWE, where he performs on the SmackDown brand and Lucha Libre AAA Worldwide (AAA) under the ring name Erik. He is in a tag team with Ivar called The War Raiders. He is the former one-time AAA World Tag Team Champion. He is a former two-time World Tag Team Champion with Ivar and are former one-time NXT Tag Team Champion.

Rowe is best known for his work in Ring of Honor (ROH), where he and Smith (formerly Hanson), then known as War Machine are former ROH World Tag Team Champions and made appearances for New Japan Pro Wrestling (NJPW), where they are former two time IWGP Tag Team Champions, as well as having won tag team championships in various independent promotions in the U.S. and UK.

== Professional wrestling career ==
=== Early career (2003–2013) ===
Rowe was trained by Josh Prohibition and Lou Marconi. He debuted on the independent circuit in May 2003.

On June 9, 2006, episode of Smackdown!, Rowe competed against Mark Henry in a losing effort.

=== Ring of Honor (2013–2017) ===
Rowe made his Ring of Honor debut on June 1, 2013 in a losing effort against Bobby Fish. Following this, he returned to ROH on January 4, 2014, as part of that year's Top Prospect Tournament and defeated Kongo in a first round match. After managing to advance to the finals, Rowe ultimately lost the Tournament to Hanson. Despite this, Rowe began regularly performing for ROH following the tournament in addition to forming the tag team War Machine with Hanson on April 4, 2014.

In August, Rowe was seriously injured in a motorcycle accident and was out of action for several months. On March 1, 2015, Rowe made his return to ROH at the promotion's 13th Anniversary Show by assisting his partner Hanson after the World Championship main event. On August 22, War Machine defeated Killer Elite Squad (Davey Boy Smith Jr. and Lance Archer) in a non-title match and afterwards challenged them to a match for their GHC Tag Team Championship, a title owned by the Japanese Pro Wrestling Noah promotion. War Machine received their title shot in Japan on September 19, but were defeated by the Killer Elite Squad. On December 18 at Final Battle, War Machine defeated The Kingdom (Matt Taven and Michael Bennett) to win the ROH World Tag Team Championship. They lost the title to The Addiction (Christopher Daniels and Frankie Kazarian) on May 9, 2016, at War of the Worlds. War Machine finished with ROH on December 16, 2017.

=== Japan (2015–2018) ===
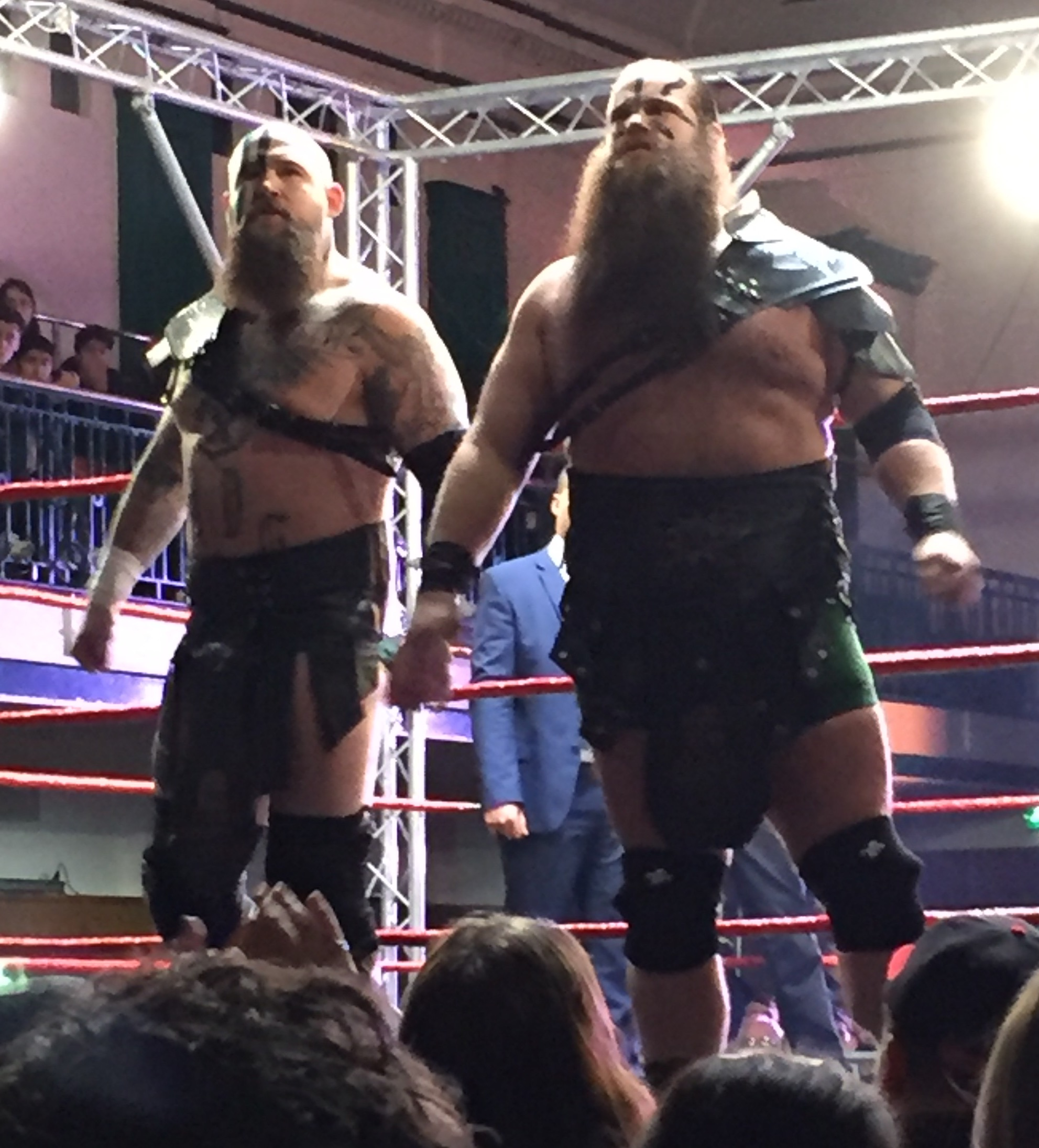
War Machine in January 2017

On September 14, 2015, Rowe and Hanson made their Japanese debuts for Pro Wrestling Noah, teaming with Takashi Sugiura in a six-man tag team main event, where they defeated Suzuki-gun (Davey Boy Smith Jr., Lance Archer and Minoru Suzuki). This led to a match five days later, where War Machine unsuccessfully challenged Smith and Archer for the GHC Tag Team Championship.

In November 2016, War Machine made their debut for New Japan Pro-Wrestling (NJPW) by entering the 2016 World Tag League. They finished the tournament on December 7 with a record of four wins and three losses, failing to advance to the finals.

On April 9, 2017, at Sakura Genesis 2017, War Machine defeated Tencozy (Hiroyoshi Tenzan and Satoshi Kojima) to win the IWGP Tag Team Championship. They lost the title to Guerrillas of Destiny (Tama Tonga and Tanga Loa) on June 11 at Dominion 6.11 in Osaka-jo Hall, regaining it in a no disqualification match on July 1 at G1 Special in USA. They lost the title to Killer Elite Squad in a three-way match, also involving Guerrillas of Destiny, on September 24 at Destruction in Kobe.

=== WWE (2018–present) ===
On January 16, 2018, WWE announced that Rowe had signed a contract with the company and would be reporting to the WWE Performance Center. On the April 11 episode of NXT, he and Hanson, now called the War Raiders, made their television debuts, attacking Heavy Machinery (Otis Dozovic and Tucker Knight) and the team of Riddick Moss and Tino Sabbatelli. On the October 17 episode of NXT, they challenged The Undisputed Era (Kyle O'Reilly and Roderick Strong) for the NXT Tag Team Championship, but won by disqualification after Bobby Fish attacked them with a steel chair; thus, they did not win the titles. The War Raiders would go on to main event NXT TakeOver: WarGames II, teaming with Ricochet and Pete Dunne against The Undisputed Era in the WarGames match with The War Raiders, Dunne and Ricochet winning the match. At NXT TakeOver: Phoenix, Rowe and Hanson defeated The Undisputed Era to win the NXT Tag Team Championship. They successfully defended their tag team championships at NXT TakeOver: New York against the team of Ricochet and Aleister Black. After having successful defenses with the NXT Tag Titles, both Rowe and Hanson would relinquish the titles after both men believed no team in NXT could beat them for the titles.

During the Superstar Shakeup event, Rowe and his partner Hanson would debut on Raw and be renamed Ivar and Erik. They also would be repackaged with the new name "The Viking Experience". The following week the team was renamed to The Viking Raiders. On the October 14, 2019, episode of Monday Night Raw Erik would capture the Raw Tag Team championships alongside his partner Ivar as "The Viking Raiders" by defeating the team of Dolph Ziggler and Robert Roode. At TLC, The Viking Raiders would host an open challenge for the Raw Tag Titles and The O.C would answer the challenge, but the match would end in a double countout. Erik and Ivar would lose the titles to the team of Seth Rollins and Buddy Murphy on the January 20, 2020, episode of Monday Night Raw after their reign lasted for 98 days. During the summer, The Viking Raiders would feud with the Street Profits which would lead to a match between the two teams at Backlash At the event, the match had never started because both teams would begin fighting in the parking lot and eventually team up as "the Viking Profits" to take out Akira Tozawa and his Ninja's. On September 7 episode Raw, The Viking Raiders teamed up with Apollo Crews and Ricochet in an eight-man tag team match against The Hurt Business in a losing effort, where Cedric Alexander scored the pinfall over Ricochet. The match was forced to an abrupt ending due to Ivar suffering a legitimate cervical injury during the match. On October 7, Erik would announce that he would be out of action after having surgery on his bicep.

On the April 13 episode of Raw, Erik along with Ivar, would return and defeat the team of Cedric Alexander and Shelton Benjamin. On the June 7 episode of Raw, The Viking Raiders would win a battle royal to determine to #1 contenders for the Raw Tag Titles. It would be announced that The Viking Raiders would face the Raw Tag Team champions, AJ Styles and Omos at Money In The Bank. At the event, The Viking Raiders would be unsuccessful, as Styles and Omos would retain their titles. On the July 19 episode of Raw, The Viking Raiders, alongside Riddle, would defeat the team of John Morrison, AJ Styles and Omos. Later that night, it would be announced that The Viking Raiders would face AJ Styles and Omos for the Raw Tag Titles in a rematch on next weeks episode of Raw. On the July 27 episode of Raw, The Viking Raiders would fail to win the Raw Tag Titles, as Styles and Omos retained.

As part of the 2021 Draft, both Erik and Ivar were drafted to the SmackDown brand. As part of the 2023 WWE Draft, both Erik and Ivar were drafted to the Raw brand. In October 2023, it was announced that Erik was injured and would not be appearing for the foreseeable future. On November 2, 2023, Erik announced on Instagram that he had undergone successful neck fusion surgery. After a year-long hiatus Erik returned from injury alongside Ivar In October 2024, cryptic messages began airing on Raw featuring Nordic characters that translate to "WAR" to promote the team's return. On the October 14th episode of RAW, Ivar and Erik returned defeating Alpha Academy reverting back to their War Raiders name and gimmick. Two weeks later they defeated the LWO and The New Day in a Triple Threat Tag Team match to become No'1 Contenders to the World Tag Team Championships held by The Judgment Day's Finn Bálor and JD McDonagh. On the November 25 episode of Raw, they failed to win the titles from Bálor and McDonagh after interference from Dominik Mysterio and Carlito. On the December 16 episode of Raw, The War Raiders defeated Bálor and McDonagh to become two-time Word Tag Team Champions.

At Night 1 of WrestleMania 41 on April 19, 2025, they lost the titles to The New Day (Kofi Kingston and Xavier Woods), ending their reign at 124 days. On the May 25, episode of Raw the War Raiders unsuccessfully challenged for the World Tag Team Championship in a Triple Threat Tag Team Match against The New Day and The Creed Brothers.After winning several matches, The War Raiders would once again challenge for the World Tag Team Championship on the December 8, episode of Raw in a losing effort to AJ Styles and Dragon Lee.

On the August 14, 2026, episode of Smackdown Ivar and Erick returned to WWE television to challenge Damien Priest and R Truth and The MFTs in a Triple Threat Tag Team match for the WWE Tag Team Championships which they lost. On the September 11, episode of Smackdown The War Raiders successfully defended their AAA World Tag Team Championships vs. Damien Priest and R Truth.

=== Lucha Libre AAA Worldwide (2026-present) ===
Erik and Ivar made their debuted on Lucha Libre AAA Worldwide (AAA) on February 14, 2026, on AAA on FOX, where they won a triple threat tag team match against Money Machine and Los Americanos to become the number one contenders for the AAA World Tag Team Championship. On May 30, 2026, at Noche de Los Grandes The War Raiders defeated Pagano and Psycho Clown to become AAA World Tag Team Champions for the first time. On September 13, at night two on TripleManía 34 The War Raiders issued an open challenge for the AAA World Tag Team Championships which was accepted by The Wagner Brothers (El Hijo de Dr. Wagner Jr. and Galeno) who defeated them putting an end to their 106 days reign.

== Personal life ==
Rowe, along with his teammate Todd Smith, are adherents to the straight edge lifestyle.

During his time with WWE, Rowe began dating fellow wrestler Sarah Bridges (then known as Sarah Logan and later Valhalla). The pair were married on December 21, 2018, in a Viking themed wedding. On February 9, 2021, Bridges and Rowe welcomed a son named Raymond Cash Rowe. On April 26, 2024, Rowe announced his wife's second pregnancy.On November 28, 2024, Bridges and Rowe welcomed a second son Ezekiel Joseph Rowe. On March 20, 2026, the couple announced that they were expecting their third child. Rowe gave birth to a daughter, named Dena Elizabeth Rowe, on October 20, 2026.

== Championships and accomplishments ==
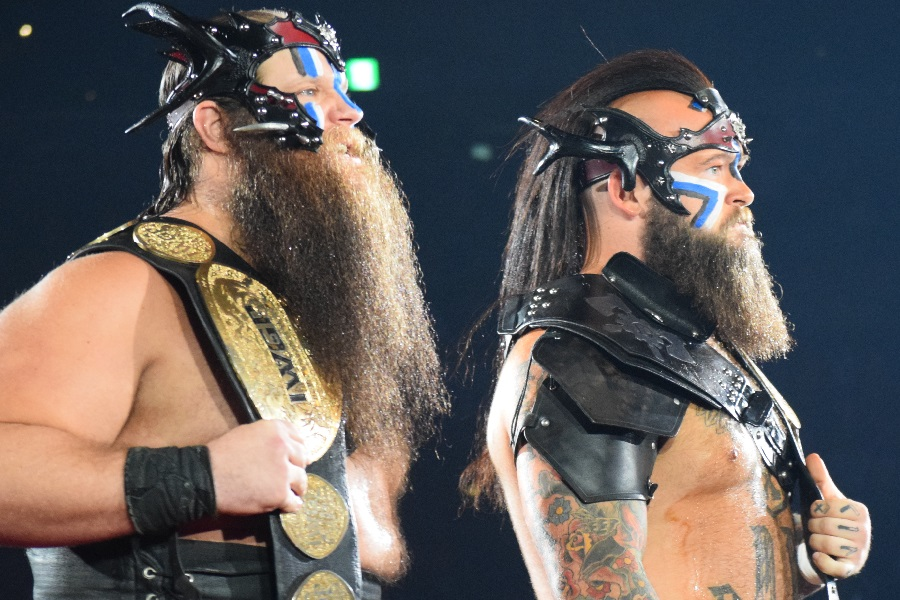
Rowe (right) and Hanson as the IWGP Tag Team Champions

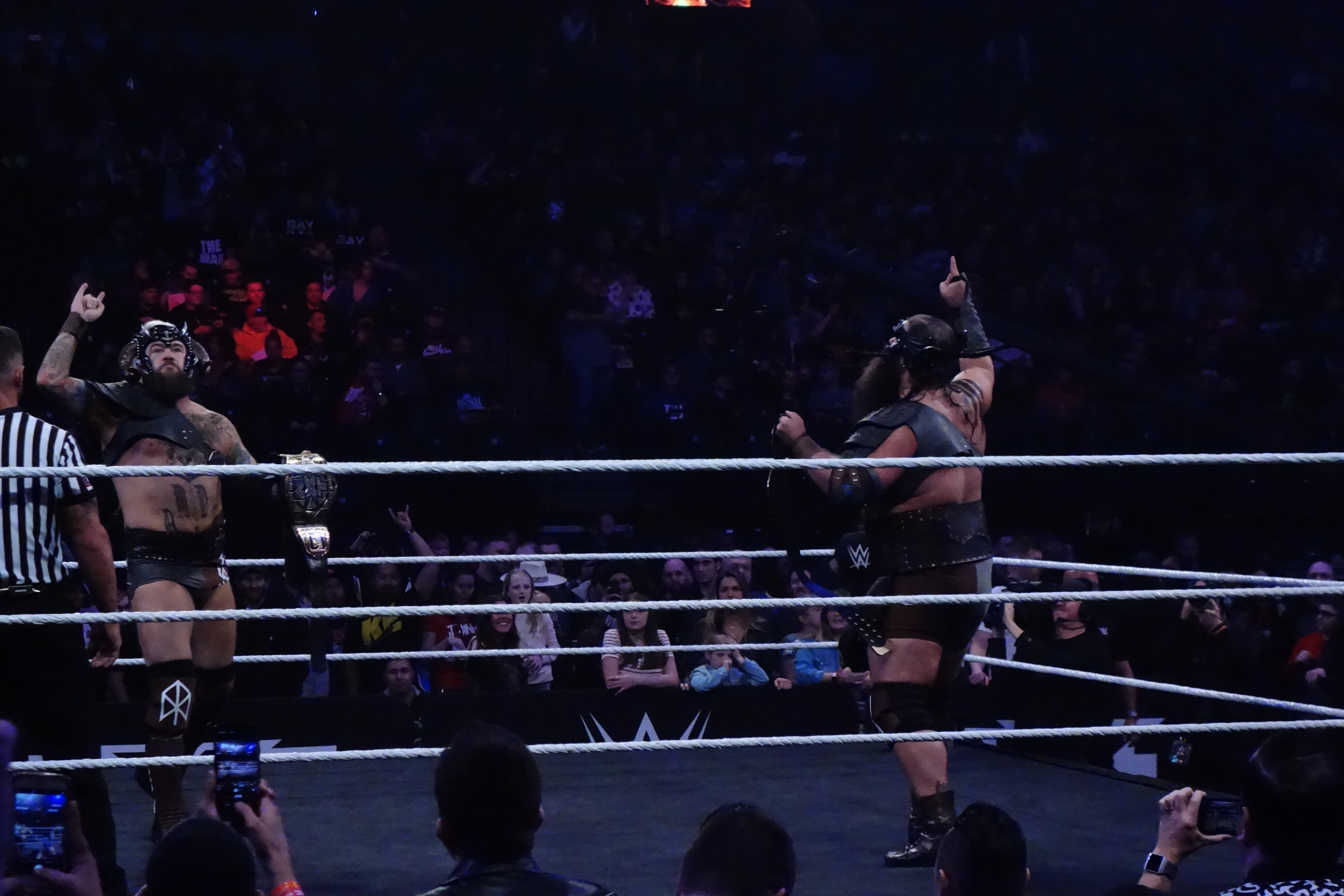
Rowe and Hanson as NXT Tag Team Champions

- Anarchy Championship Wrestling
  - ACW Unified Championship (1 time)
- Absolute Intense Wrestling
  - AIW Absolute Championship (1 time)
  - J.T. Lightning Tournament (2015)
  - Gauntlet for the Gold (2006 - AIW Absolute Championship)
- Brew City Wrestling
  - BCW Tag Team Championship (1 time) – with Hanson
- Cleveland All-Pro Wrestling
  - CAPW Heavyweight Championship (1 time)
  - CAPW Tag Team Championship (1 time) – with Jason Bane
- Firestorm Pro Wrestling
  - Firestorm Pro Heavyweight Championship (1 time)
- International Wrestling Cartel
  - IWC World Heavyweight Championship (1 time)
  - IWC Tag Team Championship (1 time) – with J-Rocc
- Lucha Libre AAA Worldwide
  - AAA World Tag Team Championship (1 time) – with Ivar
- New Japan Pro-Wrestling
  - IWGP Tag Team Championship (2 times) – with Hanson
- NWA Branded Outlaw Wrestling
  - NWA BOW Heavyweight Championship (1 time)
  - NWA BOW Outlaw Championship (1 time)
- NWA Lone Star
  - NWA Lone Star Junior Heavyweight Championship (1 time)
  - NWA Lone Star Tag Team Championship (1 time) – with Jax Dane
- NWA Wrestling Revolution
  - NWA Grand Warrior Championship (2 times)
- Pro Wrestling Illustrated
  - Ranked 97 of the 500 best singles wrestlers in the PWI 500 in 2016
- Real Action Wrestling
  - Real Action Wrestling Championship (1 time)
- Ring of Honor
  - ROH World Tag Team Championship (1 time) – with Hanson
- River City Wrestling
  - RCW Championship (1 time)
- VIP Wrestling
  - VIP Heavyweight Championship (2 times)
  - VIP Tag Team Championship (1 time) – with Hanson
- What Culture Pro Wrestling
  - WCPW Tag Team Championship (1 time) – with Hanson
- WWE
  - WWE 24/7 Championship (1 time)
  - World/WWE Raw Tag Team Championship (2 times) – with Ivar
  - NXT Tag Team Championship (1 time) – with Hanson
  - World Tag Team Championship #1 Contender Tournament (2024) – with Ivar
