= Triplemanía 34 =

2026 AAA professional wrestling event

- Promotional poster featuring various AAA and WWE wrestlers
- Promotion(s): Lucha Libre AAA Worldwide; WWE (Note: WWE handled the production for this event.)
- Date: Night 1: September 11, 2026; Night 2: September 13, 2026
- City: Night 1: Paradise, Nevada, U.S. Night 2: Azcapotzalco, Mexico City, Mexico
- Venue: Night 1: MGM Grand Garden Arena; Night 2: Arena CDMX
- Attendance: Night 1: 6,604; Night 2: 18,204

AAA event chronology
← Previous; Ola de Calor	Next → Worlds Collide

Triplemanía chronology
← Previous; XXXIII	Next → —

Triplemanía 34 was a professional wrestling livestreaming event produced by the Mexican professional wrestling promotion Lucha Libre AAA Worldwide (AAA), in partnership with its parent company WWE. The event took place across two nights. Night 1 took place on Friday, September 11, 2026, at MGM Grand Garden Arena in Paradise, Nevada, United States (southwest of adjacent Las Vegas), while Night 2 took place on Sunday, September 13, at Arena CDMX in Azcapotzalco, Mexico City, Mexico.

It was the 34th mainline Triplemanía event, the first that took place across multiple nights since Triplemanía XXXII in 2024, the 48th and 49th overall shows held under the Triplemanía banner since 1993, and the second Triplemanía held under WWE's ownership of AAA. It was also the first Triplemanía event in the United States since Triplemanía IV-A in 1996 and the first held outside Mexico since Triplemanía VIII took place in Tokyo, Japan in 2000.

The card comprised a total of 14 matches, including two dark matches, split evenly across both nights. In the main event of Night 1, Omos defeated Rey Mysterio to get reinstated in AAA. In other prominent matches, Los Perros del Mal (Daga, Angel, and Berto) defeated Los Psycho Circus (Dave the Clown, Murder Clown, and Psycho Clown) to win the AAA World Trios Championship and La Parka defeated Laredo Kid and Mr. Iguana in a triple threat match to retain the AAA Latin American Championship. Night 1 also featured the announcement of AAA President Marisela Peña's induction into the AAA Hall of Fame at Héroes Inmortales.

In the main event of Night 2, El Grande Americano defeated Dominik Mysterio in a No Disqualification match to win the AAA Mega Championship. In other prominent matches, Omos won the Copa Bardahl for the second consecutive year, La Catalina defeated Flammer to win the AAA Reina de Reinas Championship, and The Wagner Brothers (El Hijo de Dr. Wagner Jr. and Galeno) defeated The War Raiders (Erik and Ivar) to win the AAA World Tag Team Championship. Night 2 also featured the returns of Niño Hamburguesa and Pagano.

== Production ==
=== Background ===
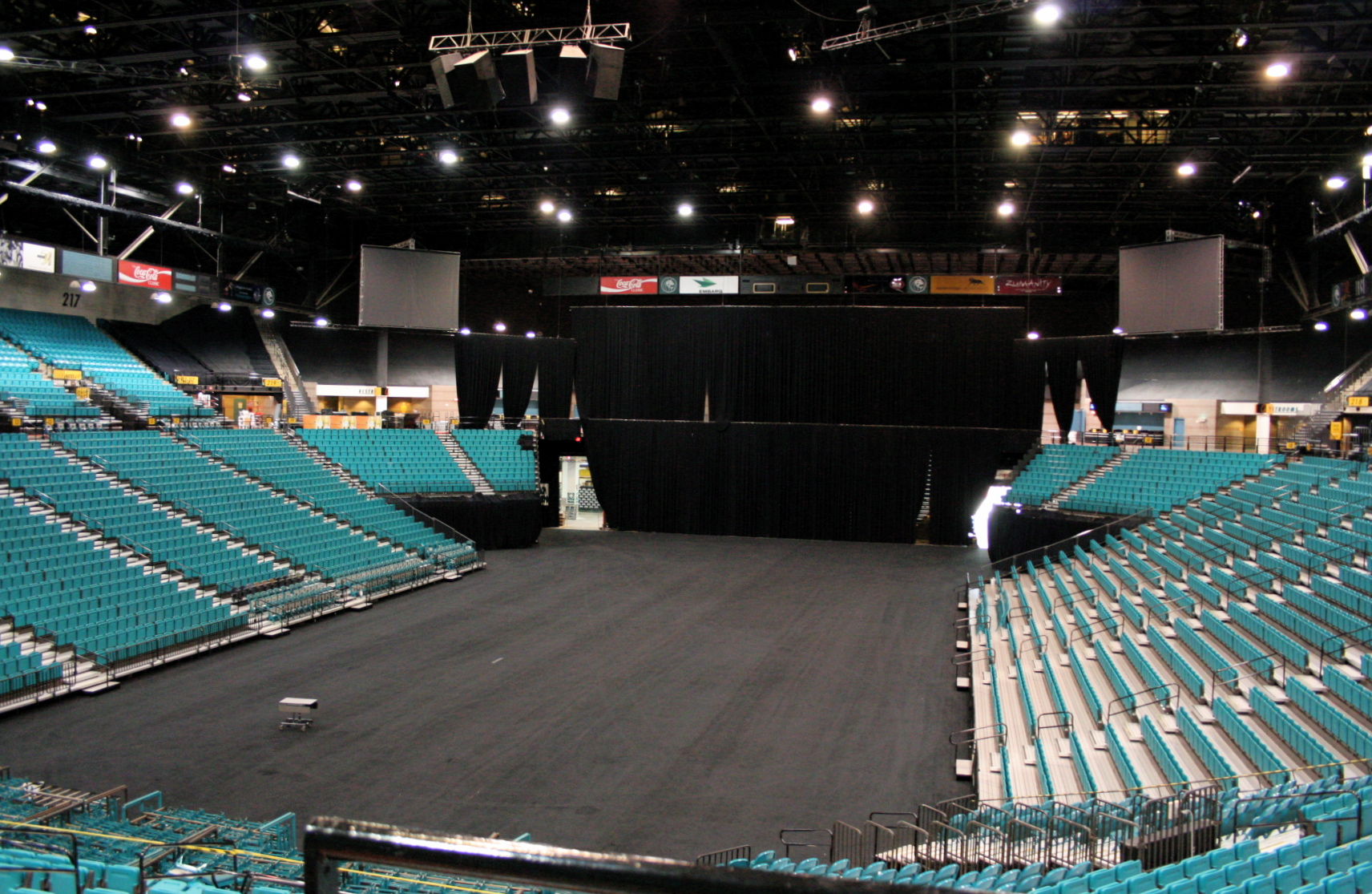
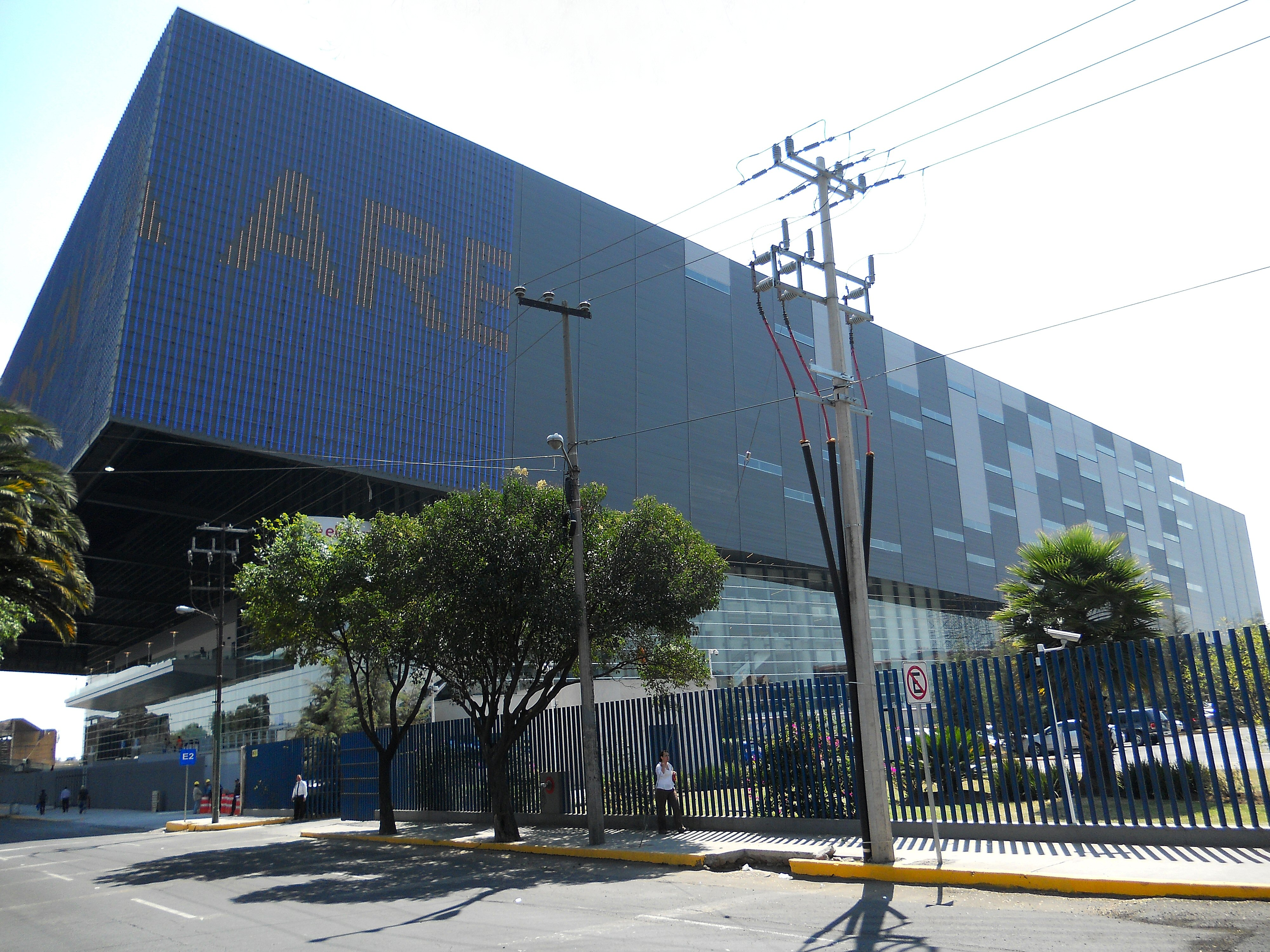
Night 1 of Triplemanía 34 took place at MGM Grand Garden Arena (top) in Paradise, Nevada, United States, while Night 2 took place at Arena CDMX (bottom) in Azcapotzalco, Mexico City, Mexico.

Triplemanía is the Mexican professional wrestling company Lucha Libre AAA Worldwide's (AAA) biggest show of the year, their equivalent of WWE's WrestleMania or New Japan Pro-Wrestling's Wrestle Kingdom. Since the Triplemanía XX in 2012, Triplemanía has taken place at the Arena Ciudad de México, also known as Arena CDMX and Mexico City Arena, an indoor arena in Azcapotzalco, Mexico City, Mexico with a maximum capacity of 22,300 spectators.

On May 9, 2026, at WWE Backlash, AAA's parent company WWE announced that Triplemanía 34 would take place across two nights. Night 1 was announced as taking place on Friday, September 11, at an unannounced venue and location, while Night 2 was announced as taking place on Sunday, September 13, at Arena CDMX in Azcapotzalco, Mexico City, Mexico. As a two-night show, Triplemanía 34 was the 48th and 49th overall Triplemanía shows promoted by AAA. On May 30 at Noche de Los Grandes, AAA initially announced Luxor Las Vegas in Paradise, Nevada, United States as the location for Night 1, but on July 30, WWE announced that Night 1 was moved to the larger MGM Grand Garden Arena due to high demand for the previously sold-out event. Night 1 of Triplemanía 34 was held the day before Ryan Garcia vs. Conor Benn, a boxing event (which was also held in Paradise, Nevada) promoted by WWE and AAA sister company Zuffa Boxing, while Night 2 was held as part of a WWE live event tour in Mexico, which would see the first episodes of Monday Night Raw and Friday Night SmackDown air from Mexico since 2011.

=== Storylines ===
Triplemanía 34 featured professional wrestling matches, with different wrestlers involved in pre-existing scripted feuds, plots and storylines. Results were predetermined by AAA's booking team and WWE's writers, while storylines were produced on AAA and WWE events. The wrestlers portrayed either heels (referred to as rudos in Mexico, those that play the part of the "bad guys") or faces (técnicos in Mexico, the "good guy" characters) as they perform.

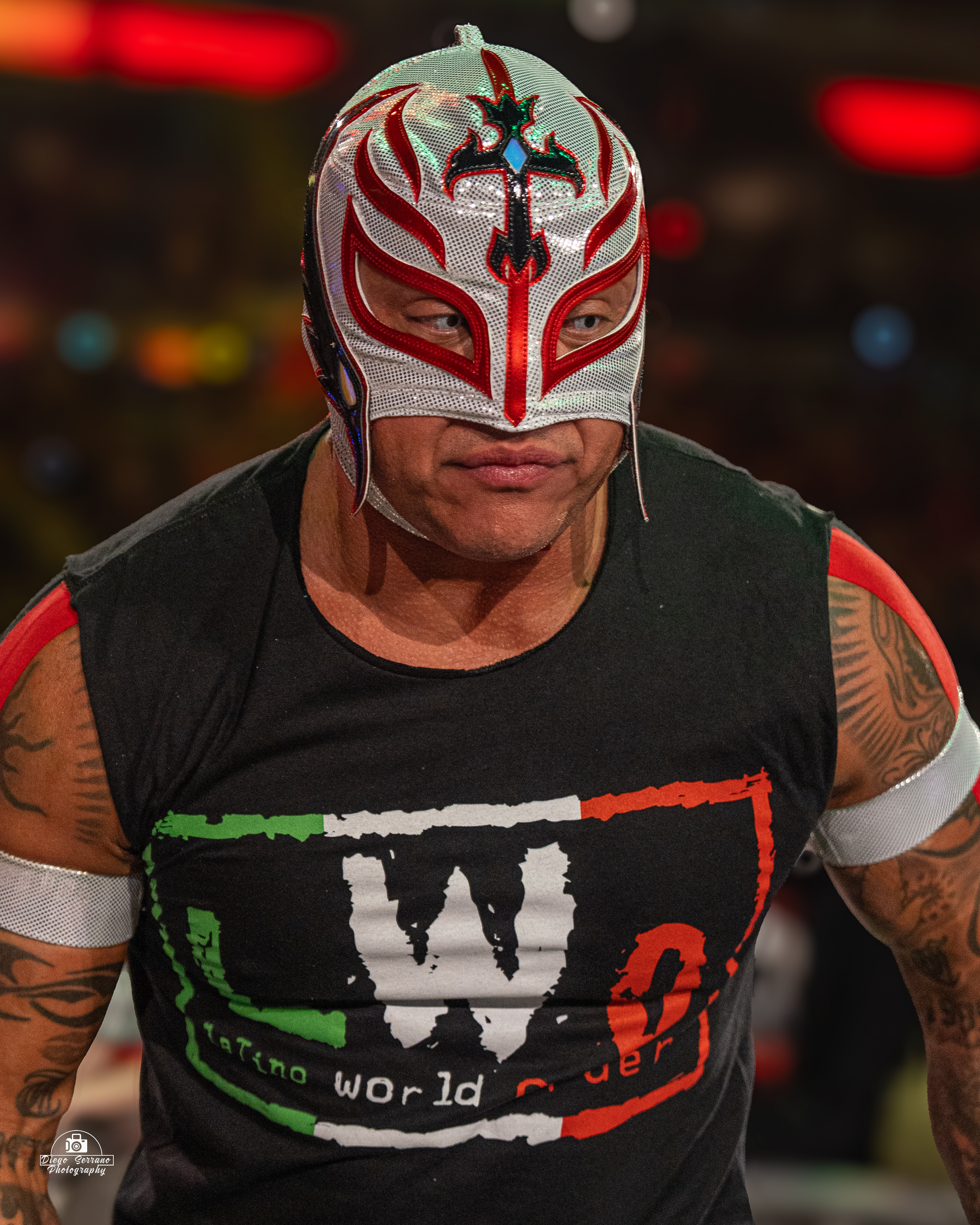
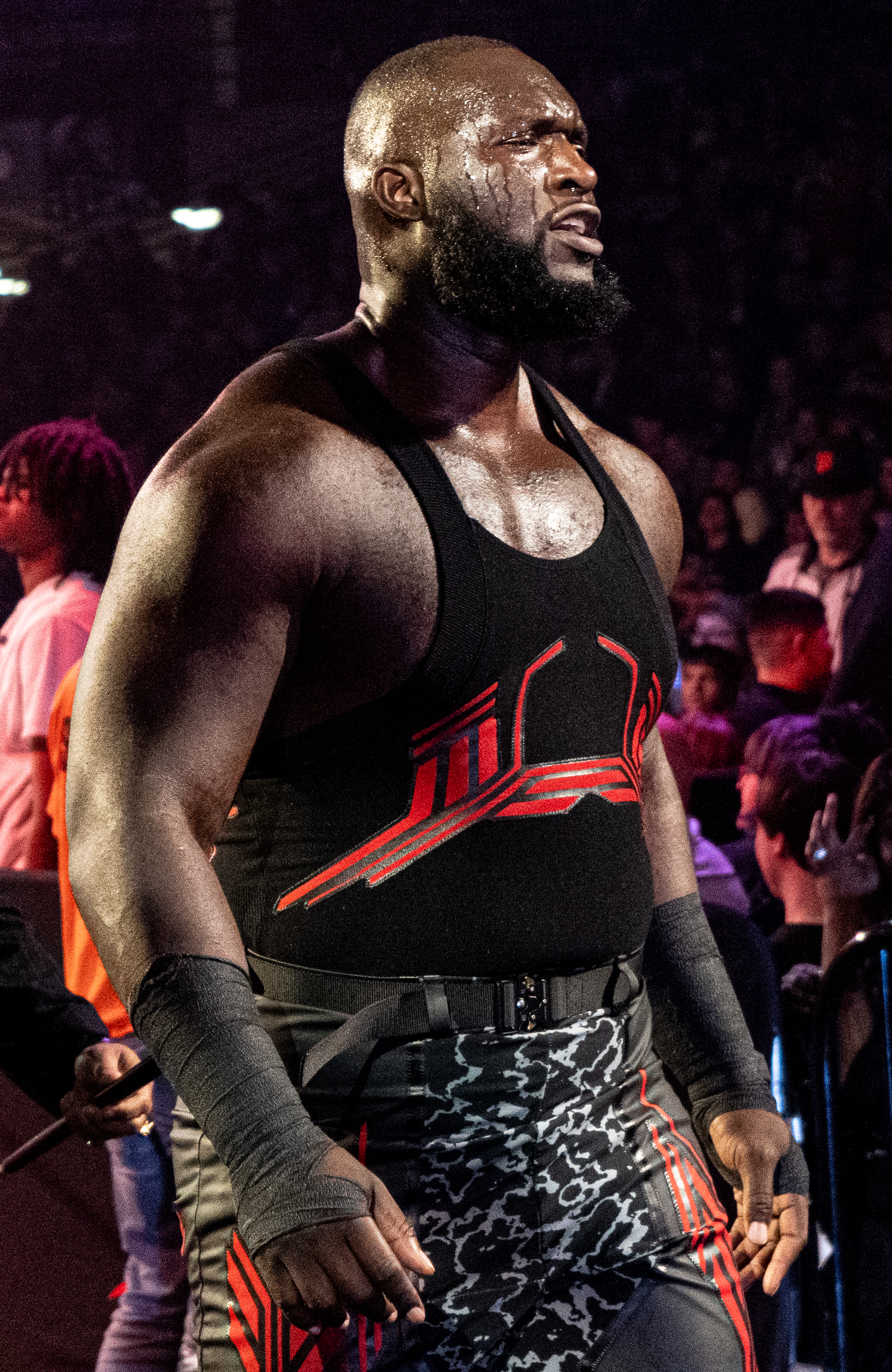
In the main event of Night 1 of Triplemanía 34, Omos's (right) fate in AAA was in jeopardy against AAA Hall of Famer Rey Mysterio (left). If Omos won, his suspension from AAA would be lifted, but if Omos lost, he would be permanently banned from AAA.
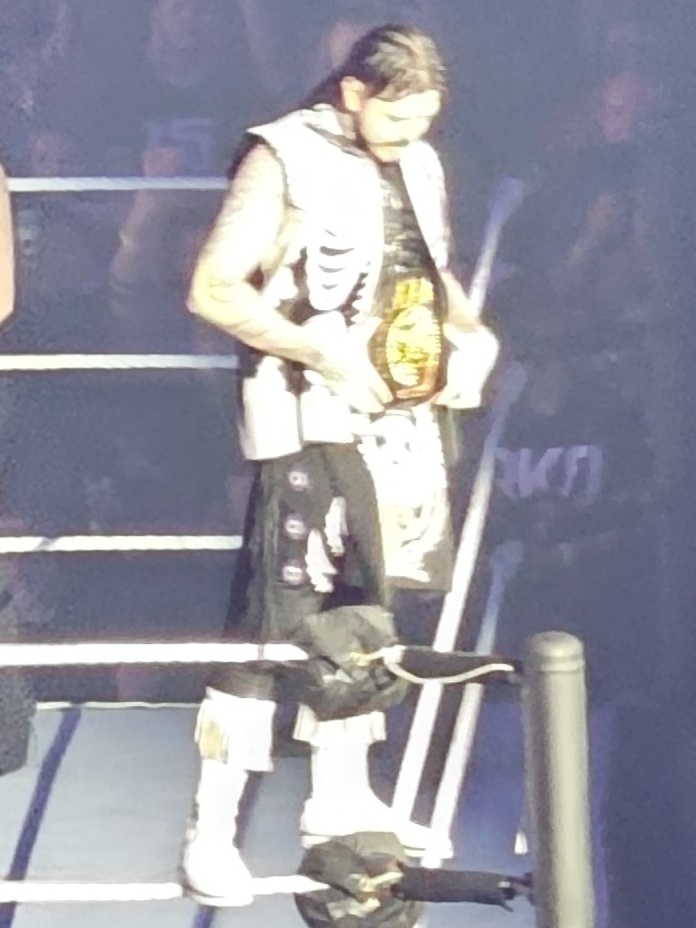
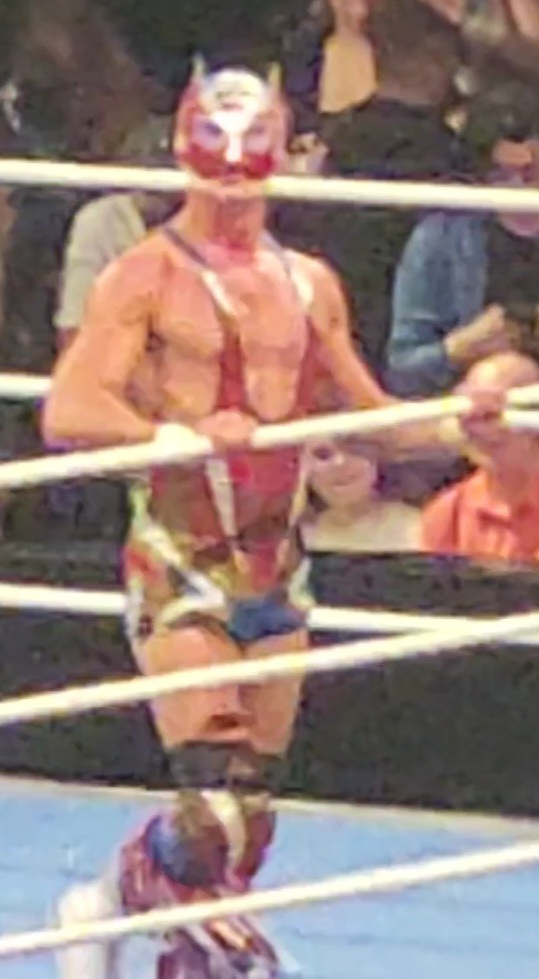
In the main event of Night 2 of Triplemanía 34, Dominik Mysterio defended the AAA Mega Championship against 2026 Rey de Reyes winner El Grande Americano.

At Week 1 of Rey de Reyes on March 14, 2026, El Grande Americano defeated La Parka, Santos Escobar, and "The Original" El Grande Americano in a fatal four-way match to win the Rey de Reyes tournament and earn the right to challenge for the AAA Mega Championship. At Week 1 of Verano de Escándalo, Americano and AAA Mega Champion Dominik Mysterio reformed Los Gringos Locos 2.0 to face Los Perros del Mal's Daga and Angel, but Mysterio would abandon Americano during their match, allowing Perros del Mal to physically overwhelm Americano and win the match. Mysterio would then reveal that he had joined El Ojo along with Omos and Dorian Roldán. Two weeks later on Week 3 of Verano de Escándalo, Mysterio versus Americano for the title at Night 2 of Triplemanía 34 was confirmed. At Ola de Calor on August 30, Mysterio and Americano had a contract signing, where Americano ordered Mysterio to prove that he is worthy of calling himself the "King of the Luchadores". Mysterio threated not to sign the contract if AAA General Manager Rey Mysterio does not lift the suspension of Omos, who was suspended after attacking Galeno and Rey, who refused Dominik's threat by threatening to strip the title off of Dominik, which Americano objected. When Omos appeared in the crowd, Rey attacked him with a microphone, prompting Americano to pull Rey away. Rey then announced a match between Omos and himself at Night 1 of Triplemanía 34, where if Omos wins, his suspension would be lifted, but if he loses, he would be banned from AAA. Dominik then signed the contract to make his match against Americano official.

On the April 11 episode of Lucha Libre AAA, Las Tóxicas (Flammer, La Hiedra, and Maravilla) celebrated Flammer's 974th day as AAA Reina de Reinas Champion, during which she declared that she had defeated all viable contenders and that her reign would continue indefinitely. They were then confronted by the debuting La Catalina, who challenged Flammer's assertions by noting they had never wrestled each other, resulting in a physical altercation between Catalina and Las Tóxicas. At Week 2 of Noche de Los Grandes on June 6, La Catalina, Bayley, and Lola Vice defeated Las Tóxicas (Flammer, La Hiedra, and Maravilla), where Catalina pinned Flammer. At Week 3 of Verano de Escándalo, Catalina and Lady Shani challenged Flammer for the title in a triple threat match, but Flammer retained the title by pinning Shani. On the August 22 episode of Lucha Libre AAA, AAA General Manager Rey Mysterio announced a gauntlet match at Ola de Calor for a shot at Flammer's AAA Reina de Reinas Championship at Triplemanía 34. The gauntlet match was won by Catalina; Flammer versus Catalina for the title was made official for Triplemanía 34.

On August 26, AAA General Manager Rey Mysterio announced a triple threat match at Ola de Calor featuring Jack Cartwheel, Mini Vikingo, and Nathan Frazer for the right to challenge Rey Fénix for the AAA World Cruiserweight Championship match at Night 2 of Triplemanía 34. At Ola de Calor, the triple threat match ended in a time-limit draw. Following the match, Fénix came out to announce that he would defend the title against Cartwheel, Vikingo, and Frazer in a fatal four-way match.

On the August 8 episode of Lucha Libre AAA, Psycho Clown competed in a triple threat first round tournament match for the vacant AAA Latin American Championship, but an unknown luchador appeared behind the barricade and attacked Clown, costing him the match. The unknown luchador would later be revealed to be named El Carnicero. At Ola de Calor, Carnicero made his in-ring debut that ended in a no contest when Carnicero did not stop choking his opponent, prompting Los Psycho Circus (Murder Clown and Dave the Clown) to come out to stop Carnicero. As Carnicero fought back, Psycho Circus member Psycho Clown arrived with a kendo stick to fend off Carnicero before challenging him to a Mexican Street Fight at Triplemanía 34.

After Ola de Calor, AAA added more matches to Triplemanía 34's match cards. On August 31, AAA General Manager Rey Mysterio announced that Los Psycho Circus (Dave the Clown, Murder Clown, and Panic Clown) would defend the AAA World Trios Championship against Los Perros del Mal (Daga, Angel, and Berto). On September 3, AAA announced a fatal four-way match involving Roxanne Perez, Faby Apache, Nattie, and La Hiedra for the right to challenge for the AAA Reina de Reinas Championship at Worlds Collide. One day later, AAA announced a fatal four-way tag team elimination match featuring Latino World Order (Cruz Del Toro and Joaquin Wilde), Los Americanos (Bravo Americano and Rayo Americano), Tokyo Bad Boys (Kento and Nobu San), and Fraxiom (Axiom and Nathan Frazer). On the September 5 episode of Lucha Libre AAA, Mr. Iguana asked Mysterio for a championship match at Triplemanía 34. Mysterio proposed that Iguana and Laredo Kid can challenge Iguana's best friend and AAA Latin American Champion La Parka in a triple threat match, which Iguana accepted. Parka then appeared, and Iguana said that he and Parka need to talk. Later that night, the AAA World Tag Team Champions The War Raiders (Erik and Ivar) announced that they would issue an open challenge for the title at Triplemanía 34. Following the episode, AAA announced a mixed Relevos Australianos between the team of Adelicious, Mascarita Sagrada, and Mini Vikingo and the team of Lady Shani, Jack Cartwheel, and Mini Abismo Negro. The event was also scheduled to host the annual Copa Bardahl, which was announced on the June 27 episode of Lucha Libre AAA.

== Events ==
=== Night 1 ===
Other on-screen personnel
Role	Name
Commentators	José Manuel Guillén
Commentators	Roberto Figueroa
English commentators	Corey Graves
English commentators	John "Bradshaw" Layfield
Ring announcer	Lilian Garcia
Referees	Adrian Butler
Referees	Tom Castor
Referees	Jeremy Marcus
Referees	Eddie Orengo

==== Preliminary matches ====
Night 1 opened with the team of Adelicious, Mascarita Sagrada, and Mini Vikingo versus the team of Lady Shani, Jack Cartwheel, and Mini Abismo Negro. Shani suffered an injury early into the match, and she was removed from the match. Cartwheel tried to dive onto an opponent, but he landed on Sagrada instead. Adelicious dove off the rope to the outside onto Cartwheel and Negro. Vikingo then later executed a "Shooting Star Press" onto Negro, in which Vikingo did a backflip off the ropes onto a supine Sagrada, to win the match via pinfall.

The second match was a fatal four-way tag team elimination match, involving Fraxiom (Nathan Frazer and Axiom), Latino World Order (Cruz Del Toro and Joaquin Wilde), Los Americanos (Rayo Americano and Bravo Americano), and Tokyo Bad Boys (Kento and Takuma). In this match, when a wrestler is eliminated via pinfall or submission, their team is eliminated. The match ends when only one team remains. Latino World Order was the first team eliminated after Wilde accidentally sprayed Del Toro's eyes with a hairspray, allowing Axiom to take advantage and eliminate them via pinfall. Bravo and Axiom later worked together against the Tokyo Bad Boys, diving off the top rope onto them to get the pinfall and eliminate the Tokyo Bad Boys. After the two remaining teams survived a few pinfall attempts, Bravo countered Axiom's kick attempt and connected with a headbutt of the top rope onto Frazer. Rayo then got a successful pinfall attempt to win the match.

Before the next match, AAA announced that AAA President Marisela Peña would be inducted into the AAA Hall of Fame at Héroes Inmortales.

Next, the challenger for the AAA Reina de Reinas Championship at Worlds Collide was decided in a fatal four-way match featuring Faby Apache, La Hiedra, Nattie, and Roxanne Perez. The reigning AAA Reina de Reinas Champion Flammer was at ringside. After Apache broke up Nattie's submission hold on Perez, Apache dove to the outside onto Nattie. Hiedra would then throw Apache into the barricade. Flammer tried to interfere by hitting Perez with the championship belt, but Perez evaded, and Flammer almost hit Hiedra. Perez then capitalized on it by executing "Pop Rox" on Hiedra, jumping over Hiedra while rolling forward to force Hiedra to fall back-first to win the match and the title shot.

In the fourth match, La Parka defended the AAA Latin American Championship in a triple threat match against Laredo Kid and Parka's close friend Mr. Iguana. Late into the match, Iguana and Parka began shoving each other after Parka voided Iguana's pinfall attempt on Kid, who then took advantage by performing an unsuccessful pin attempt on Iguana. Kid then positioned Iguana on his shoulders, but Parka attacked Kidd from off the ring post. Parka then executed a "Death Valley Driver" on Kid, spinning and slamming an upside-down Kid down back-first to retain his title via pinfall.

In the penultimate match, Los Psycho Circus (Dave the Clown, Murder Clown, and Psycho Clown) defended the AAA World Trios Championship against Los Perros del Mal (Daga, Angel, and Berto), who were accompanied by Karmen Petrovic. Psycho Circus member Panic Clown was originally slated to defend the title, but he was not medically cleared to compete so Psycho replaced him. El Carnicero appeared to attack Dave. Psycho then decided to abandon the match to chase Carnicero. Distracted by Petrovic, Dave was later forced through the barricade by Berto. Murder tried to attack Daga, but Daga stopped him by biting him. Angel then later powerbombed Murder, slamming Murder off of Angel's shoulders. Daga then stomped on Murder off the top rope with both of his feet to pin Murder and win the AAA World Trios Championship.

==== Main event ====
In the main event, Rey Mysterio and Omos fought each other to determine Omos' fate in AAA, where if Mysterio won, Omos would be permanently banned from AAA, but if Omos won, he would be reinstated to AAA. Omos was accompanied by Dominik Mysterio and Dorian Roldán, while Rey was accompanied by El Grande Americano. Rey kept attacking until Omos fell back into the ropes, and Omos got stuck with his arms wrapped in the ropes. Rey capitalized on Omos' situation by continuously attacking Rey until Dominik stopped Rey by pulling Rey out of the ring. Dominik tried to attack with a steel chair but Americano saved Rey and attacked Dominik over the announce table. Omos escaped the ropes and went to grab Rey's head, unintentionally taking out the referee in the process. While the referee was unconscious, Rey attacked Omos with a steel chair. As Dominik and Americano continued to brawl, Rey poked Omos' eye before attempting a running attack towards Omos, which Omos countered by front kicking Rey's face. Omos followed by a chokeslam on Rey, lifting Rey up by his neck before slamming him down back-first. Omos then pinned Rey to win the match and get reinstated to AAA.

Following the match, Omos continued to attack Rey. Dominik attacked Americano with a steel chair, and then emergency medical technicians came out to get Rey onto a backboard. Omos removed Rey's neck brace and executed a chokeslam on Rey, who was still attached to the backboard, through the announce table.

=== Night 2 ===
Other on-screen personnel
Role	Name
Commentators	José Manuel Guillén
Commentators	Roberto Figueroa
English commentators	Corey Graves
English commentators	John "Bradshaw" Layfield
Ring announcers	Jesús Zuñiga
Ring announcers	Lillian Garcia
Referees	Adrian Butler
Referees	Felix Fernandez
Referees	El Hijo del Tirantes
Referees	Jeremy Marcus
Referees	Rey Mysterio
Referees	Eddie Orengo
Referees	Suavecito

==== Preliminary matches ====
Night 2 opened with the annual Copa Bardahl, featuring 15 competitors. Mr. Iguana and Abismo Negro Jr. began the match. The next entrant was Negro Jr.'s Los Vipers stablemate Histeria, leading to Negro Jr. and Histeria working together against Iguana. Mascarita Sagrada came out next, helping Iguana. The fifth entrant was Los Vipers member Taurus, giving the stable the numbers advantage. The next entrant was El Fiscal, Negro Jr's rival, who eliminated Negro Jr. Fiscal was the next eliminated, which was caused by Negro Jr. Laredo Kid, Mecha Wolf, and La Parka were the next entrants. Parka eliminated Taurus and Histeria before El Mesías and Dinámico entered next. Mesías and Wolf formed an alliance and eliminated Dinámico. Texano Jr. was the 12th entrant, and he confronted his old rival Mesías. The 13th entrant was 2025 Copa Bardahl winner Omos, who was immediately targeted by everyone in the ring. Omos overpowered them and eliminated Texano Jr., Kid, Mesías, Wolf, and Parka. Chris Carter was the penultimate entrant, who was immediately eliminated by Omos. The final entrant was the returning Niño Hamburguesa. After Omos eliminated Iguana, Sagrada jumped on Omos' head, forcing Omos to lose his balance and stumble over the top rope, but Omos was not eliminated because his feet did not touch the floor; Sagrada was eliminated. Omos returned to the ring and eliminated Hamburguesa to earn his second consecutive Copa Bardahl victory.

Next, Flammer fought to keep the AAA Reina de Reinas Championship and her 1,128-day reign as champion against La Catalina. Late into the match, Flammer kicked Catalina to the outside. Flammer then looked at the stage, seemingly expecting someone to appear but no one appeared. Catalina capitalized on this to attack Flammer. Catalina then ran towards Flammer and hit Flammer with her knee to get the pinfall victory, end Flammer's reign, and become the new champion.

In the third match, El Carnicero and Psycho Clown fought in a Mexican Street Fight. As Clown made his entrance, Carnicero attacked people at ringside, which prompted Clown to initiate a brawl. Carnicero forced Clown to get stuck in the ropes. He faked a charge towards Clown, only to go out of the ring to grab a toolbox. Pagano then returned, grabbing a kendo stick before entering the ring. Pagano allowed Carnicero to hit Clown with the toolbox to get the pinfall victory. Following the match, Pagano gave the kendo stick to Carnicero, which Carnicero used to repeatedly beat Clown until the kendo stick broke.

Next, Rey Fénix defended the AAA World Cruiserweight Championship against Jack Cartwheel, Mini Vikingo, and Nathan Frazer in a fatal four-way match. Late into the match, Cartwheel dove to the outside onto Fénix and Vikingo; he then executed the "Jack's Arrow" on Frazer, in which Cartwheel backflipped off the top rope while rotating 360° before landing on a supine Frazer. Cartwheel attempted a pinfall, but Frazer kicked out at two. Vikingo dove off the top rope onto Cartwheel. Fénix then executed the "Mexican Muscle Buster", in which Fénix spun around with an upside-down Vikingo before slamming him down back-first. Fénix pinned Vikingo to retain his title. Following the match, Los Perros del Mal appeared, entering with "Perros" by Cartel de Santa as their theme song, which marked the return of the faction's iconic theme. Perros del Mal assaulted the competitors of the match.

The event's penultimate match was The War Raiders (Erik and Ivar) issuing an open challenge for their AAA World Tag Team Championship, which was answered by The Wagner Brothers (El Hijo de Dr. Wagner Jr. and Galeno). After the War Raiders executed a double powerbomb on Wagner Jr., they attempted a pinfall, but Galeno voided their attempt. Galeno then dove to the outside onto the War Raiders. Galeno then forced Erik back into the ring to have Wagner Jr. execute the "Wagner Driver" on Erik, in which Wagner Jr. turned Erik upside down before forcing Erik down neck and shoulder first. Galeno then dove off the top rope onto Erik before pinning him to become the new champions.

==== Main event ====
In the main event of Night 2 of Triplemanía 34, Dominik Mysterio, accompanied by Dorian Roldán, defended the AAA Mega Championship against 2026 Rey de Reyes winner El Grande Americano. After Mysterio repeatedly struck Americano with a steel chair, Roldán gave Mysterio his leather belt, which Mysterio used to whip Americano. After Americano countered Mysterio's attack and took control of the belt, he then returned the favor by repeatedly whipping Mysterio with the belt. As Americano was choking Mysterio, Roldán stood on the apron to distract the referee. Mysterio's Judgment Day stablemate JD McDonagh then appeared to punch Americano. Grande's Los Americanos stablemates, Rayo Americano and Bravo Americano, then appeared to get rid off McDonagh; Bravo would jump off the LED screen on the stage onto McDonagh and the security personnel.

As Bravo and Rayo walked towards the ring, Omos knocked them out. Grande dove onto Omos, but Omos grabbed Grande and drove him into the ring post instead. As Omos attempted a chokeslam on Grande, he was blocked by Grande, who poked Omos' eyes and struck Omos' groin. Grande then repeatedly struck Omos with a steel chair. Omos tried to run towards Grande, but Grande evaded, allowing Omos to run through the barricade. Mysterio tried to hit Grande's groin, but Grande evaded it. As Grande was preparing to dive off the top rope, Judgment Day member Liv Morgan appeared and knocked Grande off of the top rope.

After Grande later accidentally knocked out the referee, Morgan slid the championship belt towards Mysterio, which he used to attack Grande. Mysterio then attempted to dive off the rope onto Grande, but Grande dodged it. Grande then ran the ropes to connect with a running headbutt. Grande attempted a pinfall, but no referee was available to make the count. AAA General Manager Rey Mysterio then came out, wearing a referee's uniform, to count the successful pinfall attempt. With this pinfall victory, Grande won the AAA Mega Championship. Following the match, a mariachi band serenaded Grande as he celebrated his victory.

== Reception ==
WrestleTix reported that Night 1 of Triplemanía 34 sold an estimate amount of 6,604 tickets. AAA English commentator Corey Graves announced that 18,204 people were in attendance at Night 2 of Triplemanía 34.

=== Critical reception ===
Professional ratings
Publication		Night 1							Night 2							Ref.
Publication		Matches						Overall	Matches						Overall	Ref.
Publication		1	2	3	4	5	6	Overall	1	2	3	4	5	6	Overall	Ref.
411Mania	Thomas Hall	B–	B	B–	B–	B	B	7.5/10	C	C–	B–	A–	C+	B+	8.0/10	
411Mania	Robert Winfree	—N/a						—N/a	2.5/5	3/5	2.5/5	4.5/5	3/5	4/5	8.0/10	
Bleacher Report	Erik Beaston	C	A	B+	B	B	C+	B	—N/a						—N/a	
Bleacher Report	Chris Mueller	—N/a						—N/a	B	B	B+	A	B	A–	B+	
Súper Luchas		6.8/10	8.6/10	6.6/10	6.1/10	7.1/10	6.6/10	—N/a	5.6/10	5.8/10	5.5/10	8.1/10	5.6/10	7.6/10	—N/a	
Voices of Wrestling		2.75/5	3.5/5	1.75/5	3/5	3.25/5	2/5	—N/a	3/5	3.5/5	3.25/5	4/5	2/5	3.75/5	—N/a	
Wrestling Observer Newsletter		3.5/5	4.5/5	2.75/5	3.25/5	2.75/5	1.25/5	—N/a	3.5/5	3.5/5	3.25/5	5.25/5	2/5	3/5	—N/a	
Match order: Night 1; 1. Adelicious, Mascarita Sagrada, and Mini Vikingo vs. Lady Shani, Jack Cartwheel, and Mini Abismo Negro in a mixed Relevos Australianos; 2. Fraxiom (Nathan Frazer and Axiom) vs. Los Americanos (Rayo Americano and Bravo Americano) vs. Latino World Order (Cruz Del Toro and Joaquin Wilde) vs. Tokyo Bad Boys (Kento and Takuma) in a fatal four-way tag team elimination match; 3. Faby Apache vs. La Hiedra vs. Nattie vs. Roxanne Perez in a fatal four-way match; 4. La Parka (c) vs. Laredo Kid vs. Mr. Iguana in a triple threat match for the AAA Latin American Championship; 5. Los Psycho Circus (Dave the Clown, Murder Clown, and Psycho Clown) (c) vs. Los Perros del Mal (Daga, Angel, and Berto) for the AAA World Trios Championship; 6. Omos vs. Rey Mysterio; Night 2; 1. Copa Bardahl; 2. Flammer (c) vs. La Catalina for the AAA Reina de Reinas Championship; 3. El Carnicero vs. Psycho Clown; 4. Rey Fénix (c) vs. Jack Cartwheel vs. Mini Vikingo vs. Nathan Frazer in a fatal four-way match for the AAA World Cruiserweight Championship; 5. The War Raiders (Erik and Ivar) (c) vs. The Wagner Brothers (El Hijo de Dr. Wagner Jr. and Galeno) for the AAA World Tag Team Championship; 6. Dominik Mysterio (c) vs. El Grande Americano in A No Disqualification match for the AAA Mega Championship

==== Night 1 ====
Thomas Hall of 411Mania noted that the heavy slate of multi-person matches grew tiring as the night progressed, though he felt the show improved significantly with the AAA World Trios Championship match and the main event. Erik Beaston of Bleacher Report considered Night 1 superior to recent WWE offerings while falling just short of an "A", framing it as an effective setup for Night 2 and a "damn fun way to spend a few hours". Pro Wrestling Torch's David Miller called it a "spectacular opening night of Triplemanía". Taking a far more critical stance, Chris Vetter of Pro Wrestling Dot Net called it a "pretty lackluster show" despite the "generally good" matches, criticizing the commercial breaks for ruining the pacing and arguing that nothing stood out as worthy of the Triplemanía stage. Griffin Peltier of Voices of Wrestling similarly panned the event as "not really lucha" and akin to a standard weekly TV broadcast, concluding that none of the action was must-see and advising fans to skip Night 1 altogether.

Beaston described Night 1's opening match as a "nice warmup" that "fared extremely well", heavily carried by Mini Vikingo and Jack Cartwheel. He also commended John "Bradshaw" Layfield's commentary on Mini Abismo Negro. Hall called it a fun match and singled out Mini Vikingo as "one of the smoothest fliers". Miller sympathized with the early setback from Lady Shani's injury while applauding the "truly phenomenal" action. Meanwhile, Peltier felt the "fine" match never fully recovered after Shani's departure, though he enjoyed the veteran teamwork of Mascarita Sagrada and Mini Abismo Negro. Both Vetter and Beaston noted that the remaining wrestlers held the bout together "pretty well" under the circumstances.

Miller noted that the fatal four-way tag team elimination match delivered as expected from a "superbly talented" group of tag teams, recommending it to fans of "fast and furious" action. Peltier wrote that after two teams were eliminated, the bout became a "spotfest" that "kicked [the match] into another gear", while singling out Rayo Americano as one of AAA's best and most underrated young talents. Hall similarly found it to be an "insane" showcase of high-flying maneuvers, noting that while it dragged near the end, the late false finishes successfully saved the momentum. Although Beaston felt the match might have been stronger focused solely on Los Americanos (Rayo and Bravo Americano) versus Fraxiom (Nathan Frazer and Axiom), he praised all four teams and commended AAA's roster depth for featuring eight "extraordinary" performers capable of thriving as singles competitors. He recognized Fraxiom as Night 1's most valuable players.

Regarding the number one contender's fatal four way match for the AAA Reina de Reinas Championship, Hall noted that Roxanne Perez's victory provided "fresh blood" for the title picture, while Beaston highlighted the "great in-ring action" and a finish that heightened the ongoing turmoil within the Las Tóxicas stable. Conversely, Miller observed that the crowd remained mostly silent, characterizing the match as sloppy and noting that Perez and Faby Apache appeared lost in the ring. Peltier was similarly critical, labeling the match "boring" and arguing that 45-year-old Apache remaining the top female wrestler in Mexico was indicative of the current state of the division.

Regarding the triple threat match for the AAA Latin American Championship, Beaston praised the chemistry and seamless meshing of wrestling styles, while Miller called the bout "very entertaining" despite its predictable outcome. Vetter said that it was the best match of the night. Ricardo Rendón of Súper Luchas noted that the action improved as it progressed, and Peltier highlighted La Parka putting his friendship with Mr. Iguana aside to retain his title as the most compelling moment, adding that the match might have landed better on Night 2 in Mexico City. On the other hand, Hall struggled to connect with the match, suspecting fatigue from the event's abundance of multi-person matches and remarking that it felt like "just a bunch of moves until Parka hit his finisher to win".

Hall commended the AAA World Trios Championship match as better than most of the card due to its "more coherent story", noting that Los Perros del Mal needed the win. Beaston viewed it as the "foregone conclusion match of the night" that wrote a crucial chapter in the faction's revival, with the titles "potentially serving as a power chip", a sentiment echoed by Miller, who noted that Perros del Mal continued their strong momentum. Peltier praised Angel as the most valuable player of the faction's revival, describing him as the "most genuinely dangerous and willing to go all the way to hurt you", while Rendón called it a "good fight" that effectively set the stage for the Mexican Street Fight on Night 2.

Beaston called the main event a "strong way to end the show" that established a direct bridge to Night 2's main event, noting that the crowd's reaction to Omos elevated the match. Hall viewed it as a "perfectly nice story" centered on a smaller luchador using every tool to bring down a giant, while Miller found the outcome predictable and executed "about how it would play out". Conversely, Peltier felt it was "pretty bad as far as standard giant [versus] small guy matches go", criticizing the failure to play to Rey Mysterio's strengths and calling Omos incapable of producing engaging action; he did, however, single out the brawl between El Grande Americano and Dominik Mysterio as the hottest point of the contest while noting that nothing in the match matched the intensity of Omos' post-match attack. Vetter added that the match was not worthy of being the main event of Triplemanía.

==== Night 2 ====
Robert Winfree of 411Mania and Miller both praised it as an entertaining, fun opener for Night 2, with Miller noting that Omos' victory was predictable following his win on Night 1. Peltier called it one of the best editions of the Copa Bardah;, highlighting the Mexico City crowd as a major improvement over Night 1 in Las Vegas and singling out Mascarita Sagrada nearly eliminating Omos as the match's standout moment. In contrast, Hall described it as "pretty mediocre".

== Aftermath ==
A few days after Lady Shani suffered an injury during the opening match of Night 1 of Triplemanía 34 that had her removed from said match, Shani revealed on her Instagram account that she received cuts on her eyelid.

== Results ==
Night 1 (September 11)
No.	Results	Stipulations	Times
1^{D}	El Fiscal defeated Dinámico (Note: This match aired on the September 19, 2026, episode of Lucha Libre AAA.)	Singles match	4:30
2	Adelicious, Mascarita Sagrada, and Mini Vikingo defeated Lady Shani, Jack Cartwheel, and Mini Abismo Negro by pinfall	Mixed Relevos Australianos	9:14
3	Los Americanos (Rayo Americano and Bravo Americano) defeated Fraxiom (Nathan Frazer and Axiom), Tokyo Bad Boys (Kento and Takuma), and Latino World Order (Cruz Del Toro and Joaquin Wilde)	Fatal four-way tag team elimination match	17:22
4	Roxanne Perez defeated Faby Apache, La Hiedra, and Nattie by pinfall	Fatal four-way match for a AAA Reina De Reinas Championship match at Worlds Collide	9:11
5	La Parka (c) defeated Laredo Kid and Mr. Iguana by pinfall	Triple threat match for the AAA Latin American Championship	12:58
6	Los Perros del Mal (Daga, Angel, and Berto) (with Karmen Petrovic) defeated Los Psycho Circus (Dave the Clown, Murder Clown, and Psycho Clown) (c) by pinfall	Trios match for the AAA World Trios Championship	10:45
7	Omos (with Dominik Mysterio and Dorian Roldán) defeated Rey Mysterio (with El Grande Americano) by pinfall	Singles match Since Omos won, his suspension from AAA was lifted. Had Mysterio won, Omos would have been permanently banned from AAA.	12:38
(c) / – the champion(s) heading into the match; D / – this was a dark match

Night 2 (September 13)
No.	Results	Stipulations	Times
1^{D}	La Hiedra defeated Faby Apache by pinfall	Singles match	4:11
2	Omos won by last eliminating Niño Hamburguesa	15-man Copa Bardahl	22:47
3	La Catalina defeated Flammer (c) by pinfall	Singles match for the AAA Reina de Reinas Championship	10:25
4	El Carnicero defeated Psycho Clown by pinfall	Mexican Street Fight	8:22
5	Rey Fénix (c) defeated Jack Cartwheel, Mini Vikingo, and Nathan Frazer by pinfall	Fatal four-way match for the AAA World Cruiserweight Championship	14:22
6	The Wagner Brothers (El Hijo de Dr. Wagner Jr. and Galeno) defeated The War Raiders (Erik and Ivar) (c) by pinfall	Tag team match for the AAA World Tag Team Championship; This was an open challenge.	5:51
7	El Grande Americano defeated Dominik Mysterio (c) (with Dorian Roldán) by pinfall	No Disqualification match for the AAA Mega Championship	17:33
(c) / – the champion(s) heading into the match; D / – this was a dark match

=== Fatal four-way tag team elimination match ===
Order of elimination
No.	Wrestler	Team	Eliminated by	Method	Time
1	Cruz Del Toro	Latino World Order	Axiom	Pinfall	5:57
2	Takuma	Tokyo Bad Boys	Axiom	Pinfall	9:46
3	Nathan Frazer	Fraxiom	Rayo Americano	Pinfall	17:22
—	Los Americanos (Rayo Americano and Bravo Americano)		Winners		17:22

=== Copa Bardahl ===
– Winner

List of entrants and eliminations
Draw	Entrant	Eliminated by	Order	Elimination(s)
1	Mr. Iguana	Omos	12	0
2	Abismo Negro Jr.	El Fiscal	1	1
3	Histeria	La Parka	4	0
4	Mascarita Sagrada	Omos	13	0
5	Taurus	La Parka	3	0
6	El Fiscal	Abismo Negro Jr.	2	1
7	Laredo Kid	Omos	7	0
8	Mecha Wolf	Omos	9	1
9	La Parka	Omos	10	2
10	El Mesías	Omos	8	1
11	Dinámico	El Mesías and Mecha Wolf	5	0
12	Texano Jr.	Omos	6	0
13	Omos	Winner	—	9
14	Chris Carter	Omos	11	0
15	Niño Hamburguesa	Omos	14	0
