= Lady Flammer =

Mexican professional wrestler (born 1999)

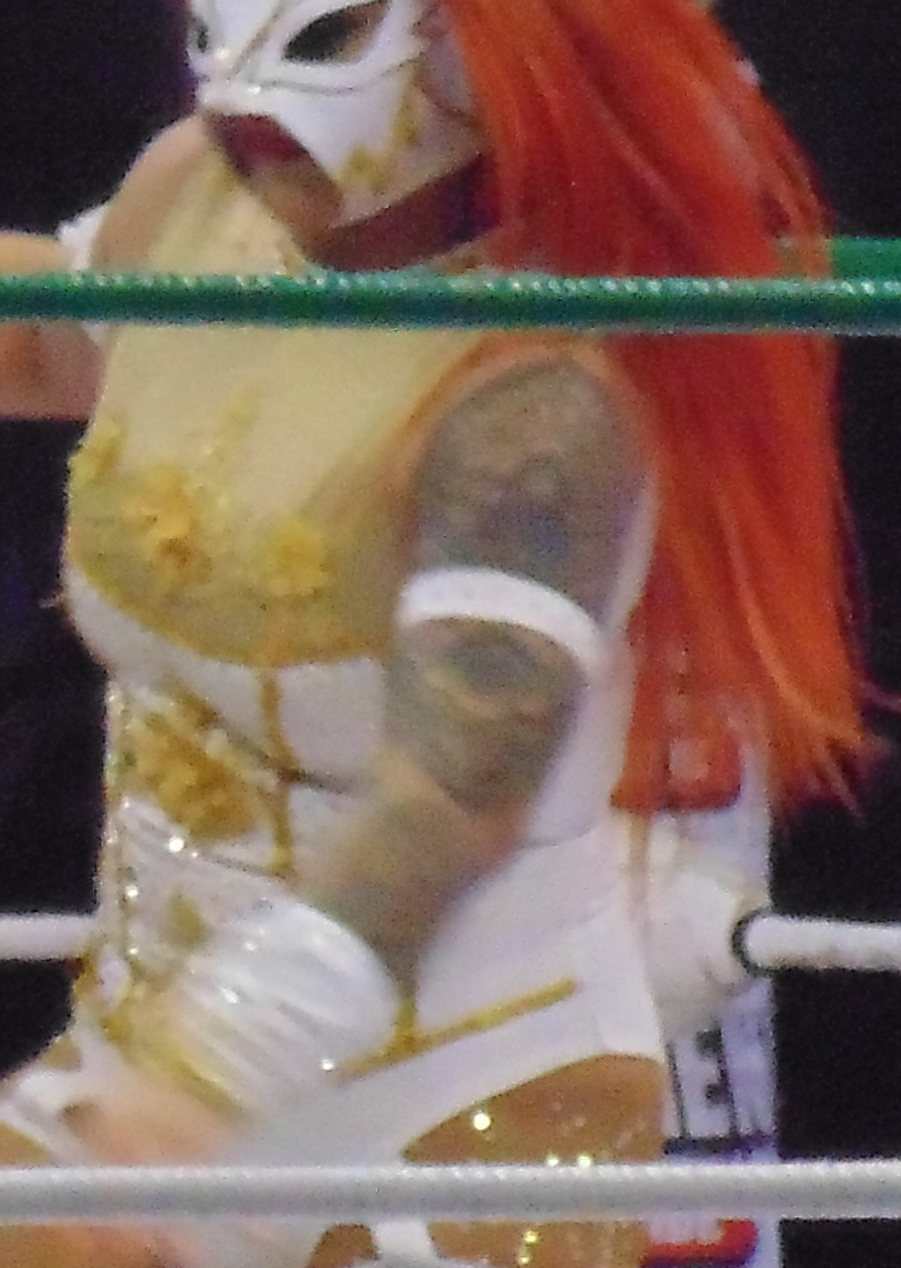
- Lady Flammer in 2026

Personal information
- Born: November 9, 1999 (age 27) Monterrey, Nuevo León, México
- Children: 1

Professional wrestling career
- Ring name(s): Flammer; Lady Flamer; Lady Flammer
- Billed height: 157 cm (5 ft 2 in)
- Billed weight: 60 kg (130 lb)
- Billed from: San Nicolás, Nuevo León, México
- Trained by: Red Flamer; Arcangel
- Debut: 2009

Lady Flammer (born November 9, 1999) is a Mexican professional wrestler. She is signed to WWE, where she performs on their sister brand Lucha Libre AAA Worldwide (AAA). She is also the leader of Las Tóxicas.

Flammer is a former one-time AAA Reina de Reinas Champion; her 1,128-day reign is the longest in the title's history. Her real name is not a matter of public record, as is often the case with masked wrestlers in Mexico where their private lives are kept a secret from the wrestling fans.

== Professional wrestling career ==
Flammer made her professional wrestling debut on August 29, 2010. Over the next eight years, Flammer competed on the Mexican independent circuit, most notably appearing for independent promotions Federacion Universal De Lucha Libre and Promociones Kdna.

On January 28, 2018, Flammer made her debut on The Crash Lucha Libre teaming up with Latigo in a mixed tag team match where they were defeated by Christi Jaynes and Danny Limelight. On February 10, Flammer and Limelight were defeated by Black Danger and Lacey Lane. In February 2019, Flamer defeated Jaynes, Miranda Alize and Reyna Isis to win The Crash Women's Championship for first time.

On December 28, 2022, at Noche de Campeones, Flammer and Abismo Negro Jr. won the vacant AAA World Mixed Tag Team Championship in three way match, which also involved Komander and Sexy Star II, and Octagón Jr. and Lady Shani. On June 18, at Triplemanía XXX: Tijuana, Flammer won the Lucha de Apuestas match and, as a result, Chik Tormenta was forced to unmask and reveal her real name.

On August 12, 2023, at Triplemanía XXXI: Mexico City, Flammer defeated Taya Valkyrie in a no disqualification match to win the AAA Reina de Reinas Championship.

On October 6, 2024, Flammer and Negro lost the titles to Crazzy Steve and Havok at Héroes Inmortales, ending her reign of 648 days.

On March 15 episode of AAA, Flammer defeated Bayley on the AAA Reina de Reinas Championship open challenge to continue her reign at a record-breaking 945 days with help from Las Toxicas. At Night 2 of Triplemanía 34 on September 13, Flammer lost the title to La Catalina, ending her record-setting Reina de Reinas Championship reign at 1,128 days.

== Personal life ==
Lady Flammer and her partner, The Tiger (son of Apolo Estrada Jr.), share a son together.

== Championships and accomplishments ==
- Kaoz Lucha Libre
  - Kaoz Women's Tag Team Championship (1 time, inaugural) – with Sexy Dulce
- Lucha Libre AAA Worldwide
  - AAA Reina de Reinas Championship (1 time)
  - AAA World Mixed Tag Team Championship (1 time) – with Abismo Negro Jr
- Lucha Libre Femenil
  - LLF Championship (1 time)
  - LLF Tag Team Championship (1 time) – with Lady Puma
  - Copa Juvenil LLF (2013, 2014)
- The Crash Lucha Libre
  - The Crash Women's Championship (1 time)
- Promociones Universal
  - Promociones Universal Women's Championship (1 time)
- Pro Wrestling Illustrated
  - Ranked No. 42 of the top 250 women's wrestlers in the PWI Women's 250 in 2023

== Luchas de Apuestas record ==
Winner (wager)	Loser (wager)	Location	Event	Date	Notes
Lady Flamer (mask)	RBD (mask)	N/A	Live event	N/A	
Lady Flamer (mask)	Cicloncito (mask)	Saltilo, Coahuila	Live event	August 15, 2010	(Note: Intergender wrestling match)
Lady Flamer (mask)	Nahomi (mask)	Monterrey, Nuevo León	Aniversario LLF	December 1, 2017	(Note: Lost a four-way match that also included Angelica and Suzuky)
Lady Flamer (mask)	Sadik Maiden (hair)	San Juan Pantitlán	Mexasis II	December 7, 2019	(Note: Last two wrestlers in a steel cage match that also included Lunatik Fly, Sadica, Fly Star, La Heroína, Lunatik Xtreme, and Sobredosis)
Flammer (mask)	Chik Tormenta (mask)	Tijuana	Triplemanía XXX: Tijuana	June 18, 2022	
