= La Catalina =

Chilean professional wrestler (born 2000)

Personal information
- Born: Catalina Aurora García Corrial; May 4, 2000 (age 26) Santiago, Chile

Professional wrestling career
- Ring names: Carolina; Catalina; Jessy; Katrina Cortez; La Catalina
- Trained by: Alejandro Saez; BCW; Coyote; Guanchulo; Montoya; RLL Wrestling Academy; Sara Del Rey; Serena Deeb; Timothy Thatcher; WWE Performance Center
- Debut: 1 February 2014

Catalina Aurora García Corrial (born May 4, 2000) is a Chilean professional wrestler. As of April 2026, she is signed to the WWE, where she performs on its sister promotion Lucha Libre AAA Worldwide (AAA) under the ring name La Catalina and is the current AAA Reina de Reinas Champion in her first reign.

García debuted in professional wrestling at the age of 14 under the name Jessy. She then signed with the WWE in 2019 employing multiple character names before leaving in 2021. After her two year hiatus, García then signed with Consejo Mundial de Lucha Libre (CMLL) in 2023 where she won the Campeona Universal de Amazonas before she left CMLL in April 2026 and re-signed with the WWE joining the AAA roster that same month. In 2018, during her first run in WWE, García became the first Chilean wrestler to sign with the promotion.

== Professional wrestling career ==
=== Early career (2014–2019) ===
Before joining WWE, García trained at the RLL Wrestling Academy. García made her debut in 2014 as Jessy, mainly competing on the Chilean independent scene.

=== WWE (2019–2021) ===
García was invited to a WWE try-out in 2017, and impressed enough to be offered a developmental contract by William Regal, even though she was 17 at the time. She signed it once she turned 18.

García made her WWE television debut on the November 4, 2019, episode of Raw. Wearing a luchador mask and appearing under the name Carolina, she teamed with Sin Cara in a mixed tag match won by Andrade and Zelina Vega. The following year in 2020, Garcia returned to television simply as Catalina during the April 22 episode of Main Event, losing to Asuka. She returned to Main Event on the April 29 episode, losing to Bianca Belair.

She made her NXT television debut in 2020 on the January 15 episode, competing in a number one contender's battle royal won by Bianca Belair. She returned on the September 23 episode of NXT to compete in another number one contender's battle royal won by Candice LeRae.

In January 2021, during NXT's New Year's Evil special, she returned, debuting both a new appearance and name as Katrina Cortez. During this episode, Cortez lost to Xia Li. She wrestled a modest number of matches during the months of August and September, appearing on 205 Live and NXT. Cortez wrestled her final match on the October 29 episode of 205 Live, in a loss to Sarray. In 2021, she left WWE, largely due to her work visa expiring.

Due to her young age, social pressures from representing her country, and undiagnosed polycystic cysts that caused her weight to wildly fluctuate, García found her WWE experience highly taxing mentally and almost gave up on wrestling after her release. She used her WWE earnings to pay off her university fees and become a licensed physical trainer, but was talked out of abandoning her dream by her father. After this, García took her career to Mexico, where she first wrestled on the independent scene before becoming a poster name for Big Lucha. A fan throwing her a Dr. Simi plushie during a match in support of her work (a trend at the time) greatly improved her confidence.

=== Consejo Mundial de Lucha Libre (2023–2026) ===
On March 3, 2023, García made her debut in Consejo Mundial de Lucha Libre (CMLL) as La Catalina, having previously attended a seminar by Último Guerrero. Up until that point, she had wrestled wearing a mask and her identity was unknown to the public, as is common in lucha libre. Before her debut, she voluntarily took off her mask, which is very unusual, as a luchador normally loses the mask through a loss in a stake match, so-called lucha de apuestas. She has since claimed this was because she wanted to leave the WWE run it represented in the past, and be her authentic Chilean self.

In CMLL, La Catalina had a modestly successful career, most notably winning the 2023 Campeona Universal de Amazonas. She had a long-standing rivalry with compatriot Stephanie Vaquer, where they both wrestled for New Japan Pro-Wrestling, Japan's largest wrestling promotion.

In July 2024, La Catalina announced that she will have to undergo surgery in August of that year for a cyst, and that she had been struggling with a lot of pain for the last year. In December 2025, she wrestled days after undergoing laser eye surgery and suffered complications that caused her to take further time off. On April 7, 2026, CMLL announced that La Catalina had left the promotion. According to Bodyslam, she was frustrated with her position in the company when she was relegated to the lower part of the card, behind wrestlers from AEW.

=== Return to WWE and Lucha Libre AAA Worldwide (2026–present) ===
On April 11, 2026, García made her return to the WWE after a four year absence where she made her debut in WWE's sister promotion Lucha Libre AAA Worldwide (AAA) as La Catalina, crashing Flammer's celebration. On the second night of Triplemanía 34, La Catalina defeated Flammer to win the Reina de Reinas Championship, ending Flammer's reign at a record 1,128 days.

== Personal life ==
García was inspired to become a wrestler after playing WWE SmackDown! vs. Raw 2006 on PlayStation 2 as a child and seeing highlights of Trish Stratus, whom she associated with her favourite character Barbie. Both she and her family have attempted to aid the Chilean independent scene in return for putting her on WWE's radar, including donating production equipment, catering shows, offering training seminars, and sponsoring the country's first all-women's championship tournament.

She cites Raul Mendoza as a close friend who helped her through confidence difficulties before her debut RAW match.

García was married to El Elemental, a Mexican professional wrestler from Mérida, known from Big Lucha and excursuions to the United States and Canada. The marriage took place in April 2024. El Elemental signed to CMLL that same year, and joined Los Barbaros with Barbaro Cavernario and El Terrible in 2025 as part of their feud against former member Dragon Rojo Jr.. In April 2026, following Catalina's jump to AAA, El Elemental clarified that they had separated months prior.

== Championships and accomplishments ==
- Alto Voltaje
  - Women’s Championship (1 time, inaugural)
- Consejo Mundial de Lucha Libre

- CMLL Universal Amazons Championship (2023)
- Copa Tzompantli de Amazonas (2024)

- Lucha Libre AAA Worldwide
  - AAA Reina de Reinas Championship (1 time, current)
- Pro Wrestling Illustrated
  - Ranked No. 82 of the top 250 female wrestlers in the PWI Women's 250 in 2025
- Revolucion Lucha Libre
  - RLL Women's Champion (2 time)
- Wrestling Knock Out Chile
  - WKC Women’s Championship (1 time, inaugural)
- Wrestling On Web
  - On Web Women’s Championship (1 time)
- Yeyos Dojo
  - Mojonero Championship (1 time)
