= Triplemanía =

Lucha Libre AAA World Wide event series

- Created by: Antonio Peña
- Promotions: Lucha Libre AAA Worldwide; WWE (since 2025)
- Brand(s): Raw (since 2025); SmackDown (since 2025); NXT (since 2025)
- First event: Triplemanía I

Triplemanía is an annual lucha libre event promoted by the Mexican professional wrestling promotion Lucha Libre AAA Worldwide (AAA). The event is traditionally held in August annually. The name is a combination of how "AAA" is pronounced in Spanish, "Triple A", and WrestleMania, WWE's biggest annual show. It is the promotion's flagship event, featuring the culminations of several long-building storylines. Several events have been presented as a series of shows; either two or three per year. Most events have been distributed via pay-per-view, while others are shown as television specials on the Televisa channel, or as livestreams on Twitch. Since 2025, this event is now promoted by the WWE through its acquisition of AAA.

== History ==
The first Triplemanía event was held on April 30, 1993, at Plaza de Toros in Mexico City, Mexico. The event drew 48,000 spectators, the largest number for any Triplemanía, and the largest number of spectators for any wrestling event in Mexico. In 1994, 1995, and 1996, AAA held three Triplemanía events; while two events were held in 1997. From 1998 to 2019, only one event has been held.

Triplemanía has twice been held outside of Mexico; Triplemanía IV-A was held in Chicago, Illinois, and Triplemanía VIII was held in Tokyo, Japan. As is tradition with major AAA shows, Triplemanía feature inside a hexagonal wrestling ring; instead of the usual four-sided ring used for regular television events and house shows.

== Events ==
| # | Event | Date | City | Venue | Main event | Ref |
|---|---|---|---|---|---|---|
| 1 | Triplemanía I | April 30, 1993 | Mexico City, D.F., Mexico | Plaza de Toros | Cien Caras vs. Konnan in a 2-out-of-3 Retirement match | |
| 2 | Triplemanía II-A | April 26, 1994 | Aguascalientes, Aguascalientes, Mexico | Alberto Romo Chávez Stadium | Heavy Metal vs. Jerry Estrada in a 2-out-of-3 Cabellera contra Cabellera match | |
| 3 | Triplemanía II-B | May 15, 1994 | Zapopan, Jalisco, Mexico | Benito Juárez Stadium | Konnan, Perro Aguayo, and Cien Caras vs. Jake Roberts, Love Machine, and Miguel Pérez, Jr. | |
| 4 | Triplemanía II-C | May 27, 1994 | Tijuana, Baja California, Mexico | El Toreo | Konnan vs. Jake Roberts in a 2-out-of-3 Cabellera contra Cabellera match | |
| 5 | Triplemanía III-A | June 10, 1995 | Orizaba, Veracruz, Mexico | Convention Center | 13-Minis Steel Cage Elimination Cabellera contra Cabellera match | |
| 6 | Triplemanía III-B | June 18, 1995 | Tonalá, Jalisco, Mexico | Rio Nilo Coliseum | Winners vs. Marabunta in a 2-out-of-3 Cabellera contra Cabellera match | |
| 7 | Triplemanía III-C | June 30, 1995 | Madero, Mexico | Convention Center | Winners vs. Super Caló in a 2-out-of-3 Cabellera contra Cabellera match | |
| 8 | Triplemanía IV-A | May 11, 1996 | Chicago, Illinois, U.S. | International Amphitheatre | Konnan and Perro Aguayo vs. Pierroth, Jr. and Cien Caras in a Lumberjack match | |
| 9 | Triplemanía IV-B | June 15, 1996 | Orizaba, Veracruz, Mexico | Orizaba Bullring | La Parka, Octagón, and Máscara Sagráda vs. Killer, Cien Caras, and Heavy Metal in a Lumberjack match | |
| 10 | Triplemanía IV-C | July 15, 1996 | Madero, Mexico | Convention Center | Los Payasos (Coco Rojo, Coco Verde and Coco Amarillo) and Karis la Momia vs. Los Junior Atomicos (Máscara Sagrada Jr., Tinieblas Jr., Blue Demon, Jr., and Halcón Dorado Jr.) in a Steel cage Cabellera contra Cabellera match | |
| 11 | Triplemanía V-A | June 13, 1997 | Tijuana, Baja California, Mexico | Plaza de Toros | Perro Aguayo, Tinieblas Jr., and El Canek vs. Jake Roberts, Killer, and Gorgeous George III | |
| 12 | Triplemanía V-B | June 15, 1997 | Naucalpan, Mexico | El Toreo | Perro Aguayo, Octagón, Cibernético, and El Canek vs. Jake Roberts, Gorgeous George III, El Cobarde II, and Fuerza Guerrera | |
| 13 | Triplemanía VI | June 7, 1998 | Chihuahua, Chihuahua, Mexico | Gymnasio Manual Bernardo Aguirre | Kick Boxer vs. Heavy Metal in a Steel cage Cabellera contra Cabellera match | |
| 14 | Triplemanía VII | June 11, 1999 | Madero, Mexico | Convention Center | Perro Aguayo, Octagón, and El Cobarde II vs. El Texano, Perro Aguayo, Jr., and Sangre Chicana | |
| 15 | Triplemanía VIII | July 5, 2000 | Tokyo, Japan | Korakuen Hall | Octagón, Jushin Thunder Liger, Latin Lover, and El Alebrije vs. Cibernético, Cima, Abismo Negro, and Electroshock | |
| 16 | Triplemanía IX | May 26, 2001 | Mexico City, D.F., Mexico | Plaza de Toros | Pirata Morgan vs. El Cobarde II vs. Sangre Chicana in a Dog Collar match Cabellera contra Cabellera match | |
| 17 | Triplemanía X | July 6, 2002 | Madero, Mexico | Convention Center | Pentagón vs. Octagón in a Cabellera contra Cabellera match | |
| 18 | Triplemanía XI | June 15, 2003 | Naucalpan, Mexico | El Toreo | Lizmark, La Parka, Octagón, and Super Caló vs. Abismo Negro, Cibernético, and The Headhunters (Headhunter A and Headhunter B) | |
| 19 | Triplemanía XII | June 20, 2004 | Naucalpan, Mexico | El Toreo | La Parka vs. Cibernético in a Cabellera contra Cabellera match | |
| 20 | Triplemanía XIII | May 15, 2005 | Guadalajara, Jalisco, Mexico | Plaza de Toros | Latin Lover, La Parka and Octagón vs. Los Hell Brothers (Chessman and Cibernético) and Fuerza Guerrera | |
| 21 | Triplemanía XIV | June 18, 2006 | Naucalpan, Mexico | El Toreo | La Parka vs. Muerte Cibernetica in a Cabellera contra Cabellera match | |
| 22 | Triplemanía XV | July 15, 2007 | Naucalpan, Mexico | El Toreo | Los Hell Brothers (Charly Manson, Chessman, and Cibernético) vs. La Legión Extranjera (El Mesias, Sean Waltman, and Kenzo Suzuki) in a Domo de la Muerte Cabellera contra Cabellera match | |
| 23 | Triplemanía XVI | June 13, 2008 | Mexico City, D.F., Mexico | Magdalena Mixhuca Sports City Palace | Cibernético (c) vs. El Zorro for the AAA Mega Championship | |
| 24 | Triplemanía XVII | June 13, 2009 | Mexico City, D.F., Mexico | Magdalena Mixhuca Sports City Palace | Team AAA (El Hijo del Santo, La Parka, Vampiro, Octagón, and Jack Evans) vs. La Legion Extranjera (Silver King, Chessman, Kenzo Suzuki, Electroshock, and Teddy Hart) in a Six Sides of Steel match | |
| 25 | Triplemanía XVIII | June 6, 2010 | Mexico City, D.F., Mexico | Magdalena Mixhuca Sports City Palace | L.A. Park vs. La Parka | |
| 26 | Triplemanía XIX | June 18, 2011 | Mexico City, D.F., Mexico | Magdalena Mixhuca Sports City Palace | Dr. Wagner, Jr. vs. Rob Van Dam for the inaugural AAA Latin American Championship | |
| 27 | Triplemanía XX | August 5, 2012 | Mexico City, D.F., Mexico | Mexico City Arena | Dr. Wagner, Jr. vs. Máscara Año 2000, Jr. in a Cabellera contra Cabellera match | |
| 28 | Triplemanía XXI | June 16, 2013 | Mexico City, D.F., Mexico | Mexico City Arena | Cibernético vs. El Hijo del Perro Aguayo in a Cabellera contra Cabellera match | |
| 29 | Triplemanía XXII | August 17, 2014 | Mexico City, D.F., Mexico | Mexico City Arena | Cibernético vs. Dr. Wagner, Jr. vs. El Hijo del Perro Aguayo vs. Myzteziz for Copa Triplemanía XXII | |
| 30 | Triplemanía XXIII | August 9, 2015 | Mexico City, D.F., Mexico | Mexico City Arena | Rey Mysterio Jr. vs. Myzteziz | |
| 31 | Triplemanía XXIV | August 28, 2016 | Mexico City, D.F., Mexico | Mexico City Arena | Psycho Clown vs. Pagano in a Máscara contra Cabellera match | |
| 32 | Triplemanía XXV | August 26, 2017 | Mexico City, Mexico | Mexico City Arena | Psycho Clown vs. Dr. Wagner Jr. in a 2-out-of-3 Máscara contra Máscara match | |
| 33 | Triplemanía XXVI | August 25, 2018 | Mexico City, Mexico | Mexico City Arena | Psycho Clown vs. El Hijo del Fantasma vs. L.A. Park vs. Pentagón Jr. in a Cage Máscara contra Máscara match | |
| 34 | Triplemanía XXVII | August 3, 2019 | Mexico City, Mexico | Mexico City Arena | Blue Demon Jr. vs. Dr. Wagner Jr. in a Máscara contra Cabellera match | |
| 35 | Triplemanía Regia | December 1, 2019 | Monterrey, Mexico | Mobil Super Stadium | Psycho Clown vs. Blue Demon Jr. vs. Aero Star vs. Dr. Wagner Jr. vs. Monster Clown vs. Texano Jr. vs. Rey Escorpión vs. Chessman in a Steel cage Máscara contra Cabellera match | |
| 36 | Triplemanía XXVIII | December 12, 2020 | Mexico City, Mexico | Mexico City Arena | Pagano vs. Chessman in a Cabellera contra Cabellera match | |
| 37 | Triplemanía XXIX | August 14, 2021 | Mexico City, Mexico | Mexico City Arena | Psycho Clown vs. Rey Escorpión in a Steel cage Máscara contra Cabellera match | |
| 38 | Triplemanía Regia II | December 4, 2021 | Monterrey, Mexico | Mobil Super Stadium | Hijo del Vikingo vs. Samuray del Sol vs. Jay Lethal vs. Bobby Fish vs. Bandido for the vacant AAA Mega Championship | |
| 39 | Triplemanía XXX: Monterrey | April 30, 2022 | Monterrey, Mexico | Mobil Super Stadium | Hijo del Vikingo and Fénix vs. The Young Bucks (Matt Jackson and Nick Jackson) | |
| 40 | Triplemanía XXX: Tijuana | June 18, 2022 | Tijuana, Mexico | Club Tijuana Stadium | Los Hermanos Lee (Dragon Lee and Dralístico) vs. Matt Hardy and Johnny Hardy | |
| 41 | Triplemanía XXX: Mexico City | October 15, 2022 | Mexico City, Mexico | Mexico City Arena | Pentagón Jr. vs. Villano IV in a Máscara contra Máscara match | |
| 42 | Triplemanía XXXI: Monterrey | April 16, 2023 | Monterrey, Mexico | Mobil Super Stadium | Hijo del Vikingo (c) vs. Komander vs. Rich Swann vs. Swerve Strickland for the AAA Mega Championship | |
| 43 | Triplemanía XXXI: Tijuana | July 15, 2023 | Tijuana, Mexico | Chevron Stadium | Hijo del Vikingo (c) vs. Kenny Omega for the AAA Mega Championship | |
| 44 | Triplemanía XXXI: Mexico City | August 12, 2023 | Mexico City, Mexico | Mexico City Arena | Psycho Clown vs Sam Adonis vs. Rush El Toro Blanco vs. L.A. Park in a Máscara contra Cabellera match | |
| 45 | Triplemanía XXXII: Monterrey | April 27, 2024 | Monterrey, Mexico | Mobil Super Stadium | Pagano, El Mesías, and Vampiro vs. La Secta (Cibernético, Dark Ozz, and Dark Cuervo) | |
| 46 | Triplemanía XXXII: Tijuana | June 15, 2024 | Tijuana, Mexico | Chevron Stadium | Vampiro, Alberto El Patrón and Los Psycho Circus (Dave The Clown and Murder Clown) vs. Team USA (Q.T. Marshall, Sam Adonis, Parker Boudreaux and Satnam Singh) | |
| 47 | Triplemanía XXXII: Mexico City | August 17, 2024 | Mexico City, Mexico | Mexico City Arena | Los Vipers (El Fiscal, Abismo Negro Jr., and Psicosis) vs. La Secta Cibernética (Cibernético, Dark Cuervo, and Dark Ozz) vs. Los Psycho Circus (Murder Clown, Dave the Clown, and Panic Clown) | |
| 48 | Triplemanía Regia III | June 15, 2025 | Monterrey, Mexico | Arena Monterrey | El Hijo del Vikingo vs. Alberto El Patrón in a Steel Cage match for the AAA Mega Championship | |
| 49 | Triplemanía XXXIII | August 16, 2025 | Mexico City, Mexico | Mexico City Arena | El Hijo del Vikingo (c) vs. El Grande Americano vs. Dragon Lee vs. Dominik Mysterio for the AAA Mega Championship | |
| 50 | Triplemanía 34 | September 11, 2026 | Paradise, Nevada, U.S. | MGM Grand Garden Arena | Rey Mysterio vs. Omos | |
| 50 | Triplemanía 34 | September 13, 2026 | Azcapotzalco, Mexico City, Mexico | Arena CDMX | Dominik Mysterio (c) vs. El Grande Americano in a No Disqualification match for the AAA Mega Championship | |

== Copa Bardahl ==
The Copa Bardahl (Spanish for Bardahl Cup) is a professional wrestling match based on a traditional battle royal, sponsored by the automotive brand Bardahl. The match is usually held annually at Lucha Libre AAA Worldwide's TripleMania events. The rules are similar to both WWE's Royal Rumble match and Major League Wrestling's Battle Riot where 12 to 17 wrestlers compete; two competitors start the match with another competitor entering every 90 seconds. In addition to eliminating opponents by throwing them over the top rope with both of their feet touching the floor like a traditional battle royal, eliminations can also occur via pinfall or submission.

List of winners
| # | Year | Winner | Times won | Event | Date | Location | Notes |
|---|---|---|---|---|---|---|---|
| 1 | 2021 | Mr. Iguana | 1 | Triplemanía XXIX | August 14, 2021 | Mexico City, Mexico | This match consisted of 12 competitors. |
| 2 | 2022 | Taurus | 1 | Triplemanía XXX: Mexico City | Octobers 15, 2022 | Mexico City, Mexico | This match consisted of 13 competitors. It occurred as a dark match. |
| 3 | 2023 | Laredo Kid | 1 | Triplemanía XXXI: Mexico City | August 12, 2023 | Mexico City, Mexico | This match consisted of 12 competitors. |
| 4 | 2024 | Pimpinela Escarlata | 1 | Triplemanía XXXII: Monterrey | April 27, 2024 | Monterrey, Nuevo Leon, Mexico | This match consisted of 14 competitors. |
| 5 | 2024 | Octagón Jr. | 1 | Triplemanía XXXII: Mexico City | August 17, 2024 | Mexico City, Mexico | This match consisted of 17 competitors. |
| 6 | 2025 | Omos | 1 | Triplemanía XXXIII | August 16, 2025 | Mexico City, Mexico | This match consisted of 14 competitors. |
| 7 | 2026 | Omos | 2 | Triplemanía 34; Night 2 | September 13, 2026 | Mexico City, Mexico | This match consisted of 15 competitors. |
