= Triplemanía XXXI =

2023 Lucha Libre AAA Worldwide event

- Promotional poster for the Monterrey event featuring various AAA luchadores and luchadoras
- Promotion: Lucha Libre AAA Worldwide
- Date: April 16, July 15, and August 12, 2023
- City: Monterrey, Mexico (April 16); Tijuana, Mexico (July 15); Azcapotzalco, Mexico City, Mexico (August 12)
- Venue: Mobil Super Stadium (April 16); Chevron Stadium (July 15); Mexico City Arena (August 12)
- Attendance: Night 1: 14,000; Night 2: 15,386; Night 3: 15,853; Combined: 45,239
- Tagline(s): Luchando Por México (Spanish for: Fighting for Mexico); Guerra de Rivalidades (Spanish for: War of Rivals)

Event chronology
← Previous; Lucha Libre World Cup	Next → Verano de Escándalo

Triplemanía chronology
← Previous; XXX	Next → XXXII

Triplemanía XXXI was a three-day professional wrestling pay-per-view (PPV) event promoted and produced by the Mexican professional wrestling promotion Lucha Libre AAA Worldwide (AAA or Triple A). The event was held on April 16, July 15, and August 12, 2023. The April 16 event took place at Mobil Super Stadium in Monterrey, the July 15 event took place at Chevron Stadium in Tijuana, and the August 12 event took place at Mexico City Arena in Mexico City. It marked the 31st year in a row that AAA has held a Triplemanía show and comprises the 40th, 41st, and 42nd overall shows promoted under the Triplemanía banner since 1993. The annual Triplemanía show is AAA's biggest event of the year, serving as the culmination of major storylines in what has been described as AAA's version of WrestleMania or their Super Bowl event. The event aired on PPV via the FITE service.

The event was themed around the Guerra de Rivalidades tournament, in which four pareja increíble tag teams competed in matches across the first two nights, with the team that lost in the finals initially being scheduled to face each other in a Lucha de Apuestas match on the third night of the event. However, as the finals ended in a draw, the Lucha de Apuestas match was turned into a four-way. In the four-way match, Psycho Clown defeated Sam Adonis to successfully defend his mask and win Adonis' hair; the match also included L.A. Park and Rush El Toro Blanco.

== Production ==
=== Background ===
2023 marked the 31st year that the Mexican professional wrestling company Lucha Libre AAA Worldwide (Triple A or AAA) has held their annual flagship Triplemanía show. Triplemanía XXXI comprised three shows – the 40th, 41st, and 42nd overall Triplemanía shows promoted by AAA (AAA promoted more than one Triplemanía event from 1994 to 1997 and from 2019 onward). Since the 2012 event, Triplemanía has taken place at the Mexico City Arena, an indoor arena in Azcapotzalco, Mexico City, Mexico that has a maximum capacity of 22,300 spectators. On January 17, 2023, AAA announced that Triplemanía XXXI would be held across three days in three cities. In addition to Arena Ciudad de México, Triplemanía XXXI was held in Mobil Super Stadium in Monterrey and Chevron Stadium in Tijuana. Triplemanía XXXI was the third Triplemanía event held with events away from Mexico City Arena during the 2020s and the fourth outside Mexico City since 2007.

Triplemanía is the company's biggest show of the year, the AAA equivalent of WWE's WrestleMania or New Japan Pro-Wrestling's Wrestle Kingdom event.

=== Storylines ===
Triplemanía XXXI featured 22 professional wrestling matches across the three nights, with different wrestlers involved in pre-existing scripted feuds, plots and storylines. Wrestlers portrayed either heels (referred to as rudos in Mexico, those that portray the "bad guys") or faces (técnicos in Mexico, the "good guy" characters) as they engaged in a series of tension-building events, which culminated in a wrestling match.

During a press conference on January 17, 2023, AAA announced that Triplemanía XXXI would be themed around the Guerra de Rivalidades tournament, in which four pareja increíble tag teams will compete in matches across the first two nights, with the members of the team that loses in the finals facing each other in a Lucha de Apuestas match on the third night. The teams participating in the tournament are Psycho Clown and Sam Adonis, Pagano and Rush El Toro Blanco, Pentagón Jr. and Alberto El Patrón, and Blue Demon Jr. and DMT Azul. On February 27, it was announced that Pagano was pulled from the tournament due to an injury and would be replaced by a mystery partner. During a press conference on March 28, Rush's new partner was revealed as L.A. Park.

During a press conference on February 27, 2023, AAA announced that a Steel Cage match featuring 10 luchadores enmascarados would take place at the Triplemanía XXXI: Monterrey event. The last two wrestlers who do not escape from the cage will compete in a Lucha de Apuestas Mask vs. Mask match. The participants in the match were revealed as Laredo Kid, Antifaz del Norte, Octagón Jr., Villano III Jr., Argenis, Myzteziz Jr., Aero Star, La Parka Negra, Dralístico, and Taurus. During a press conference on March 28, it was announced that Dralístico would be replaced in the match by Abismo Negro Jr.

On October 18, 2021, AAA announced that Kenny Omega would defend his AAA Mega Championship against Hijo del Vikingo at Triplemanía Regia II. On November 18, it was reported by the Wrestling Observer Newsletter that Omega would not participate in the event due to undergoing multiple surgeries. The reports were confirmed by AAA on November 22, with the promotion canceling Omega's defense and vacating the Mega Championship. The Triplemanía Regia match was changed to a five-way match, where Vikingo defeated Samuray del Sol, Jay Lethal, Bobby Fish, and Bandido to win the vacant championship. The match between Vikingo and Omega occurred two years later on the March 22, 2023 episode of AEW Dynamite, where Omega defeated Vikingo in a non-title match. During a AAA press conference on April 24, a rematch for the Mega Championship between Vikingo and Omega was announced for Triplemanía XXXI: Tijuana.

== Results ==
=== Triplemanía XXXI: Monterrey (April 16) ===
No.	Results	Stipulations	Times
1	Laredo Kid, Antifaz del Norte, Octagón Jr., Villano III Jr., Aero Star, La Parka Negra, Abismo Negro Jr., and Taurus defeated Myzteziz Jr. and Argenis by escaping the cage. The two losers were relegated to Mask vs. Mask match later on the card.	10-man Steel Cage match	15:06
2	Vampiro (with Mr. Iguana) defeated Chessman (with La Hiedra) by pinfall	Singles match	10:56
3	Team Regio (El Zorro, Flammer, Baby Extreme, El Hijo de L.A. Park and Toscano) defeated Team Chilango (Negro Casas, Dave The Clown, Arez, Niño Hamburguesa, and Látigo) by pinfall (Note: Toscano was the sole survivor for his team.)	Triplemanía XXXI: Monterrey Cup match	15:14
4	Pentagón Jr. and Alberto El Patrón defeated Sam Adonis and Psycho Clown (with Jack Fancy) by submission	Tag team match Guerra de Rivalidades first round	13:32
5	Myzteziz Jr. (with Dulce Canela and Sexy Star II) defeated Argenis (with La Hiedra and Maravilla) by pinfall	Lucha de Apuestas Mask vs. Mask match Was held between the final two participants in the 10-man Steel Cage match	9:54
6	DMT Azul and Blue Demon Jr. defeated Rush El Toro Blanco and L.A. Park by pinfall	Tag team match Guerra de Rivalidades first round	16:06
7	Hijo del Vikingo (c) defeated Komander, Rich Swann, and Swerve Strickland by pinfall	Four-way match for the AAA Mega Championship	22:17
(c) / – the champion(s) heading into the match

=== Triplemanía XXXI: Tijuana (July 15) ===
No.	Results	Stipulations	Times
1	La Hiedra won by last eliminating Flammer (Note: The match also included Willie Mack, Mr. Iguana, Jack Cartwheel, Myzteziz Jr., Puma King, Niño Hamburguesa, Dinámico, Gringo Loco, Laredo Kid, Taurus, and Rey Misterio Heredero)	Triplemanía XXXI: Tijuana Cup match	26:55
2	Team Mexico (Dalys, Sexy Star II and Lady Shani) defeated Team Rest of The World (Viva Van, Kamille and Natalia Markova) by pinfall	Trios match	12:19
3	Vampiro, Jack Evans, and Aramís vs. Pagano and La Rebelión (Bestia 666 and Mecha Wolf) (with Estrellita) ended in a no contest	Trios match	14:02
4	Team Baja (Damian 666, Rey Horus, Xtreme Tiger and Nicho el Millonario) (with Brandon Moreno) defeated Team Chilango (Negro Casas, Chessman, Argenis, and Daga) (with Aczino) by pinfall	Atómicos match	9:29
5	QT Marshall (with Aaron Solo) defeated Pentagón Jr.	Ambulance match	18:46
6	Rush El Toro Blanco and L.A. Park vs. Sam Adonis and Psycho Clown ended in a draw (Note: Rush El Toro Blanco and Sam Adonis pinned L.A. Park and Psycho Clown, respectively, at the same time, thus the match ended in a draw.)	Tag team match Guerra de Rivalidades finals	22:38
7	Hijo del Vikingo (c) (with Don Callis) defeated Kenny Omega by pinfall	Singles match for the AAA Mega Championship	18:52
(c) / – the champion(s) heading into the match

=== Triplemanía XXXI: Mexico City (August 12) ===
No.	Results	Stipulations	Times
1^{D}	Drago II and Jack Evans defeated Abismo Negro Jr. and Belcegor by pinfall	Tag team match	—
2	Las Toxicas (La Hiedra and Maravilla) and Chik Tormenta defeated Lady Shani, Dalys and Sexy Star II	Trios match	13:41
3	Laredo Kid won by last eliminating Komander (Note: The match also included: Willie Mack, Dave the Clown, Pagano, Aramís, Mr. Iguana, Murder Clown, Arez, Octagón Jr., Myzteziz Jr., and Niño Hamburguesa)	Bardahl Cup TripleManía XXXI match	29:59
4	Flammer (with La Hiedra and Maravilla) defeated Taya (c) (with Lady Shani) by pinfall	Singles match for the AAA Reina de Reinas Championship	9:42
5	Negro Casas (with Aczino) defeated Nicho el Millonario (with Argenis) by pinfall	Legends match	13:12
6	Q.T. Marshall defeated Pentagón Jr., Dralístico, and Texano Jr. by pinfall	Four-way match for the vacant AAA Latin American Championship	17:43
7	Hijo del Vikingo (c) defeated Jack Cartwheel, Mike Bailey and Daga by pinfall	Four-way match for the AAA Mega Championship	16:06
8	Psycho Clown (mask) defeated Sam Adonis (hair) by pinfall Match also included: L.A. Park (mask) and Rush El Toro Blanco (hair) (with La Bestia del Ring, Dralístico, Preston Vance, and José the Assistant)	Four-way Lucha de Apuestas Hair vs. Mask match	20:17
(c) / – the champion(s) heading into the match; D / – this was a dark match

== Guerra de Rivalidades tournament bracket ==
First Round; Triplemanía XXXI: Monterrey (April 16)
Pentagón Jr. and Alberto El Patrón	Pin
Psycho Clown and Sam Adonis
Rush El Toro Blanco and L.A. Park
Blue Demon Jr. and DMT Azul	Pin

Finals; Triplemanía XXXI: Tijuana (July 15)
Psycho Clown and Sam Adonis
Rush El Toro Blanco and L.A. Park	Draw

Lucha de Apuestas match Triplemanía XXXI: Mexico City (August 12)
Psycho Clown (Note: This was a four-way match that also included Rush El Toro Blanco and L.A. Park.)	Pin
Sam Adonis

Unlike traditional wrestling tournaments, at each round of the Guerra de Rivalidades tournament, the losers, not the winners, are relegated to the next round. The team that lost in the tournament final was intended to compete in a Lucha de Apuestas match at the final night of Triplemanía. Since the finals ended in draw, the Lucha de Apuestas match was turned into a four-way. During the four-way match, Psycho Clown pinned Sam Adonis to successfully defend his mask and win Adonis' hair; the match also involved Rush El Toro Blanco (hair) and L.A. Park (mask).

== See also ==
- 2023 in professional wrestling
- List of major Lucha Libre AAA Worldwide events

== Commentators ==
- Hugo Savinovich
- José Manuel Guillén
