= Triplemanía XXVIII =

2020 Lucha Libre AAA Worldwide event

- Promotional poster featuring various AAA luchadores and luchadoras
- Promotion: Lucha Libre AAA Worldwide
- Date: December 12, 2020
- City: Azcapotzalco, Mexico City, Mexico
- Venue: Arena Ciudad de México
- Attendance: 0 (behind closed doors) (Note: The event was held without an audience due to the COVID-19 pandemic in Mexico.)
- Tagline(s): Cada Lucha Tiene Un Comienzo... (Spanish for: Every Fight Has A Beginning...)

Event chronology
← Previous; AAA vs MLW	Next → Rey de Reyes

Triplemanía chronology
← Previous; Regia	Next → XXIX

Triplemanía XXVIII was a professional wrestling event produced and scripted by the Mexican professional wrestling promotion Lucha Libre AAA Worldwide (AAA). The event was originally scheduled to take place on August 22, 2020 at Arena Ciudad de México in Mexico City, but was moved to December 12 due to the COVID-19 pandemic. It marked the 28th year in a row that AAA has held a Triplemanía show, and the 34th overall show held under the Triplemanía banner since 1993. The annual Triplemanía show is AAA's biggest event of the year, serving as the culmination of major storylines in what has been described as AAA's version of WrestleMania or their Super Bowl event.

In the main event match, Pagano successfully defended his hair and won the hair of Chessman in a Lucha de Apuestas Hair vs. Hair match. In other prominent matches, Kenny Omega defeated Laredo Kid to successfully defend the AAA Mega Championship and Lady Shani won the inaugural Copa Triplemanía Femenil. The event also hosted the first match of Marvel's Lucha Libre Edition project, during which Terror Púrpura and Venenoide defeated Aracno and Leyenda Americana.

== Production ==
=== Background ===
2020 marked the 28th year that the Mexican professional wrestling company Lucha Libre AAA Worldwide (Triple A or AAA) has held their annual flagship Triplemanía show. Triplemanía is the company's biggest show of the year, the AAA equivalent of WWE's WrestleMania or New Japan Pro-Wrestling's Wrestle Kingdom event. Triplemanía XXVIII will be the 34th overall Triplemanía show promoted by AAA (AAA promoted multiple Triplemanía shows over the summers of 1994 to 1997). Since the 2012 event, Triplemanía has taken place at the Arena Ciudad de México (Mexico City Arena), an indoor arena in Azcapotzalco, Mexico City, Mexico that has a maximum capacity of 22,300 spectators.

Triplemanía XXVIII was originally scheduled to take place on August 22, 2020, but was later postponed indefinitely due to the COVID-19 pandemic. During a virtual press conference on October 26, AAA announced that the event would be held at Arena Ciudad de México in December 2020.

On November 20, 2020, Lucha Central reported that Triplemanía would be held on December 26; AAA later stated that the Lucha Central report was incorrect and the event would occur on December 12 in Arena Ciudad de México. On November 30, AAA announced that the event would be held behind closed doors due to the worsening pandemic.

=== Storylines ===
Triplemanía XXVIII featured seven professional wrestling matches, with different wrestlers involved in pre-existing scripted feuds, plots and storylines. Wrestlers portrayed either heels (referred to as rudos in Mexico, those that portray the "bad guys") or faces (técnicos in Mexico, the "good guy" characters) as they engaged in a series of tension-building events, which culminated in a wrestling match.

On October 19, 2019 at Héroes Inmortales XIII, All Elite Wrestling's (AEW) Kenny Omega defeated Fénix to win the AAA Mega Championship. Omega subsequently defended the title successfully four times in both AAA and AEW. On October 26, 2020, during a virtual press conference, AAA announced that Omega would make his fifth defense of the championship at Triplemanía against Laredo Kid.

On March 11, 2020, it was announced that Pagano and Chessman would participate in a Lucha de Apuestas Hair vs. Hair match at Triplemanía. The two would brawl at the Triplemanía press conference following the match's announcement.

On October 26, 2020, during a virtual press conference, AAA announced that they had entered into a partnership with Marvel Comics to promote the new Marvel Lucha Libre Edition Funko Pop line. As part of the partnership, AAA will host a Marvel tag team exhibition match at Triplemanía, which will pit Spider-Man and Captain America against Thanos and Venom (known respectively in Mexico as Aracno and Leyenda Americana and Terror Púrpura and Venenoide); all four characters appear in the Lucha Libre Edition line.

==== Cancelled matches ====
Triplemanía XXVIII was originally planned to be themed around the Héroe o Villano tournament, which would have featured wrestlers from AAA's American partners AEW and Impact Wrestling. On March 11, 2020, it was announced that the tournament would culminate in a five-man match at Triplemanía. The match was removed from the card during a virtual press conference on October 26, 2020.

On March 11, 2020, it was announced that Triplemanía XXVIII would feature a Parejas Suicidas Tag Team Tournament, where the team that lost in the finals would have to face each other in a Lucha de Apuestas Mask vs. Mask match. It was later announced that Jinetes del Aire (Myzteziz Jr. and Octagon Jr.), La Parka Negra and Dave the Clown, Aero Star and Drago, and Los Lucha Brothers (Fénix and Pentagón Jr.) were the teams participating in the tournament. The tournament was removed from the card during a virtual press conference on October 26, 2020.

On September 15, 2019, at Lucha Invades NY, Taya Valkyrie (who previously wrestled for AAA as simply Taya) defeated Tessa Blanchard to become a three-time AAA Reina de Reinas Champion. On November 20, 2020, Lucha Central reported that Valkyrie would defend her championship against Lady Shani at Triplemanía. The match was later removed from the card.

== Results ==
No.	Results	Stipulations	Times
1	Poder del Norte (Tito Santana, Carta Brava Jr., and Mocho Cota Jr.) defeated Dinastía, Máximo, and Mr. Iguana	Trios match	16:00
2	Los Lucha Brothers (Fénix and Pentagón Jr.) (c) defeated Jinetes del Aire (Myzteziz Jr. and Octagón Jr.) and Los Mercenarios (Texano Jr. and Rey Escorpión)	Three-way tag team match for the AAA World Tag Team Championship	14:18
3	Lady Shani won by last eliminating Lady Maravilla by submission (Note: Other competitors by order of elimination: Hades, Big Mami, Pimpinela Escarlata, Mamba, Chik Tormenta, Faby Apache, and La Hiedra)	Copa Triplemanía Femenil match	11:23
4	Los Psycho Circus (Psycho Clown, Monster Clown, and Murder Clown) defeated Blue Demon Jr. and La Familia Real (L.A. Park and El Hijo de L.A. Park)	Trios match	23:10
5	Terror Púrpura and Venenoide defeated Aracno and Leyenda Americana	Tag team match This was the Marvel Lucha Libre Edition exhibition match.	11:40
6	Kenny Omega (c) (with Michael Nakazawa) defeated Laredo Kid (with El Hijo del Vikingo)	Singles match for the AAA Mega Championship	23:36
7	Pagano (with Lady Shani) defeated Chessman (with Texano Jr.)	Lucha de Apuestas Hair vs. Hair match	23:50
(c) / – the champion(s) heading into the match

== See also ==
- 2020 in professional wrestling
