= Triplemanía Regia II =

2021 Lucha Libre AAA Worldwide event

- Promotional poster featuring various AAA luchadores
- Promotion: Lucha Libre AAA Worldwide
- Date: December 4, 2021
- City: Monterrey, Mexico
- Venue: Estadio de Béisbol Monterrey
- Tagline(s): Lucha Libre AAA Worldwide Gira Aniversario XXX (Spanish for: Lucha Libre AAA Worldwide 30th Anniversary Tour); Colisión Épica (Spanish for: Epic Collision)

Event chronology
← Previous; Héroes Inmortales XIV	Next → Rey de Reyes

Triplemanía chronology
← Previous; XXIX	Next → XXX

Triplemanía Regia II was a professional wrestling pay-per-view event that was promoted and produced by the Mexican professional wrestling promotion Lucha Libre AAA Worldwide (AAA). The event was originally scheduled to take place on October 10, 2020 but was postponed and later cancelled on November 30 due to the COVID-19 pandemic. However, on October 18, 2021, AAA announced that the event would be occurring on December 4 at the Estadio de Béisbol Monterrey in Monterrey, Mexico. It marked the 29th year in a row that AAA has held a Triplemanía show, and the 36th overall show held under the Triplemanía banner since 1993. The annual Triplemanía show is AAA's biggest event of the year, serving as the culmination of major storylines in what has been described as AAA's version of WrestleMania or their Super Bowl event. The event aired on PPV via FITE TV in the U.S. and in Mexico on Space and TV Azteca.

In the main event, Hijo del Vikingo defeated Samuray del Sol, Jay Lethal, Bobby Fish, and Bandido in a five-way match to win the vacant AAA Mega Championship. In other prominent matches, Nueva Generación Dinamita (El Cuatrero, Sansón, and Forastero) defeated Los Vipers (Abismo Negro Jr., Arez, and Psicosis) and El Poder del Norte (Tito Santana, Carta Brava Jr., and Mocho Cota Jr.) in a three-way trios match to become the #1 contenders for the AAA World Trios Championship, FTR (Cash Wheeler and Dax Harwood) defeated Los Lucha Bros (Pentagón Jr. and Fénix) in a Ladder match to retain the AAA World Tag Team Championship, and Cain Velasquez teamed with Psycho Clown and Pagano to defeat L.A. Park and Los Mercenarios (Rey Escorpión and Taurus).

The event also notably saw the returns of Taya, Cibernético, Willie Mack, and Rayo de Jalisco Jr. to AAA.

== Production ==
=== Background ===
2021 marked the 29th year that the Mexican professional wrestling company Lucha Libre AAA Worldwide (Triple A or AAA) has held their annual flagship Triplemanía show. Triplemanía Regia II was the 36th overall Triplemanía show promoted by AAA (AAA promoted multiple Triplemanía shows over the summers of 1994 to 1997). Since the 2012 event, Triplemanía has taken place at the Arena Ciudad de México (Mexico City Arena), an indoor arena in Azcapotzalco, Mexico City, Mexico that has a maximum capacity of 22,300 spectators. Triplemanía Regia II was the first Triplemanía event held outside of Arena Ciudad de México during the 2020s and the second outside Mexico City since 2007.

Triplemanía is the company's biggest show of the year, the AAA equivalent of WWE's WrestleMania or New Japan Pro-Wrestling's Wrestle Kingdom event.

=== Storylines ===
Triplemanía Regia II featured eight professional wrestling matches, with different wrestlers involved in pre-existing scripted feuds, plots and storylines. Wrestlers portrayed either heels (referred to as rudos in Mexico, those that portray the "bad guys") or faces (técnicos in Mexico, the "good guy" characters) as they engaged in a series of tension-building events, which culminated in a wrestling match.

On August 14, 2021, at Triplemanía XXIX, All Elite Wrestling's Kenny Omega successfully defended the AAA Mega Championship against Andrade "El Ídolo". Following the match, Omega declared that he intended to next defend the Mega Championship against Hijo del Vikingo. On October 18, AAA announced that Omega would face Vikingo at Triplemanía Regia II. On November 18, it was reported by the Wrestling Observer Newsletter that Omega would not participate in the event due to undergoing multiple surgeries. The reports were confirmed by AAA on November 22, with the promotion canceling Omega's defense and vacating the Mega Championship. Later that day, AAA posted a graphic on Instagram announcing that a new champion would be determined in a five-way match at the event. The participants in the match were later revealed to be Vikingo, Samuray del Sol, Jay Lethal, Bobby Fish, and Bandido.

Cain Velasquez made his professional wrestling debut on August 3, 2019, at Triplemanía XXVII, in a trios match, teaming with Cody Rhodes and Psycho Clown to defeat Texano Jr, Taurus, and Killer Kross. Velasquez competed in a second AAA match at Lucha Invades NY, where he teamed with Brian Cage and Psycho Clown to defeat Rey Escorpión, Texano Jr., and Taurus. Following the match, Velasquez departed AAA and signed with WWE – Velasquez was released from his WWE contract in April 2020 due to budget cuts resulting from the COVID-19 pandemic. In October 2021, AAA began airing videos teasing Velasquez's return to the promotion. On October 18, AAA announced that Velasquez would team with Psycho Clown and Pagano to face Los Mercenarios (Rey Escorpión and Taurus) and a mystery partner at Triplemanía Regia. The partner was later revealed to be L.A. Park.

== Results ==
No.	Results	Stipulations	Times
1^{D}	Leyenda Americana and Gran Mazo defeated Venenoide and Engañoso	Tag team match This was the Marvel Lucha Libre Edition exhibition match	—
2	Las Toxicas (Lady Maravilla, La Hiedra, and Flammer) defeated Faby Apache, Lady Shani, and Sexy Star II	Lumberjacks with Straps match	10:19
3	Nueva Generación Dinamita (El Cuatrero, Sansón, and Forastero) defeated Los Vipers (Abismo Negro Jr., Arez, and Psicosis) and El Poder del Norte (Tito Santana, Carta Brava Jr., and Mocho Cota Jr.)	Three-way trios match to determine the #1 contenders for the AAA World Trios Championship	13:25
4	La Empresa (Puma King, Sam Adonis, and DMT Azul) (with Estrellita) defeated Dave the Clown, Murder Clown, and Chessman	Trios match	14:28
5	La Facción Ingobernable (Dragon Lee and Dralístico) defeated Laredo Kid and Willie Mack	Tag team match	13:54
6	FTR (Cash Wheeler and Dax Harwood) (c) (with Vickie Guerrero) defeated Los Lucha Bros (Pentagón Jr. and Fénix)	Ladder match for the AAA World Tag Team Championship	12:12
7	Psycho Clown, Pagano, and Cain Velasquez defeated L.A. Park and Los Mercenarios (Rey Escorpión and Taurus)	Trios match	15:10
8	Hijo del Vikingo defeated Samuray del Sol, Jay Lethal, Bobby Fish, and Bandido	Five-way match for the vacant AAA Mega Championship	14:22
(c) / – the champion(s) heading into the match; D / – this was a dark match

== See also ==
- 2021 in professional wrestling
- Impact of the COVID-19 pandemic on sports
