= AAA Invades WrestleCon =

2022 Lucha Libre AAA Worldwide event

- Promotional poster featuring various AAA luchadores and luchadoras
- Promotion: Lucha Libre AAA Worldwide
- Date: March 31, 2022
- City: Dallas, Texas
- Venue: Fairmont Hotel

Event chronology
← Previous; Rey de Reyes	Next → Triplemanía XXX: Monterrey

AAA Invades WrestleCon was a professional wrestling pay-per-view event produced by the Mexican promotion Lucha Libre AAA Worldwide (AAA). The event was held on March 31, 2022, and took place at the Fairmont Hotel in Dallas, Texas as part of the WrestleCon convention.

In the main event, Psycho Clown defeated Taurus. After the match, Psycho Clown was attacked by the returning Jeff Jarrett, who revealed that he was the leader of La Empresa. In other prominent matches, Laredo Kid defeated Bandido and Flamita in a three-way match to retain the AAA World Cruiserweight Championship, La Rebelión (Bestia 666 and Mecha Wolf 450) defeated Aero Star and Drago to retain the National Wrestling Alliance World Tag Team Championship, and Taya, Niño Hamburguesa, and Micro Man defeated Los Mercenarios (Rey Escorpión and La Hiedra) and Mini Abismo Negro in a Lumberjacks with Straps trios match.

== Storylines ==
AAA Invades WrestleCon featured seven professional wrestling matches, with different wrestlers involved in pre-existing scripted feuds, plots and storylines. Wrestlers portrayed either heels (referred to as rudos in Mexico, those that portray the "bad guys") or faces (técnicos in Mexico, the "good guy" characters) as they engaged in a series of tension-building events, which culminated in a wrestling match.

== Results ==
No.	Results	Stipulations	Times
1	The Natural Classics (Tome Filip and Stevie Filip) defeated Ryan Kidd and Christi Jaynes	Tag team match	6:55
2	Taya, Niño Hamburguesa, and Micro Man defeated Los Mercenarios (Rey Escorpión and La Hiedra) and Mini Abismo Negro	Lumberjacks with Straps trios match	12:58
3	La Rebelión (Bestia 666 and Mecha Wolf 450) (c) defeated Aero Star and Drago	Tag team match for the NWA World Tag Team Championship	7:37
4	Los Jinetes del Aire (Octagón Jr. and Aramís) and Mr. Iguana defeated Los Vipers (Arez and Abismo Negro Jr.) and Fabi Apache	Trios match	14:00
5	Pagano, Drago Kid, and Jack Cartwheel defeated La Empresa (Puma King, Sam Adonis, and Gringo Loco)	No Disqualification trios match	17:13
6	Laredo Kid (c) defeated Bandido and Flamita	Three-way match for the AAA World Cruiserweight Championship	8:17
7	Psycho Clown defeated Taurus	Singles match	9:14
(c) / – the champion(s) heading into the match

== Comentaristas ==
- Hugo Savinovich
- José Manuel Guillén
- Carlos Cabrera

== See also ==
- 2022 in professional wrestling
