= Komander =

Mexican professional wrestler (born 1998)

- Komander at Death Before Dishonor 2026

Personal information
- Born: December 15, 1998 (age 27) Reynosa, Tamaulipas, Mexico

Professional wrestling career
- Ring name(s): Aracno; Komander; Komander CR
- Billed height: 1.66 m (5 ft 5 1/2 in)
- Billed weight: 73 kg (161 lb)
- Billed from: Reynosa, Tamaulipas
- Trained by: Black Shadow Jr. Nacho Zapata; Super Chucky
- Debut: 2012

Komander (born December 15, 1998) is a Mexican professional wrestler. He is signed to All Elite Wrestling (AEW), where he is one-half of Los Titanes del Aire with Hologram. He also wrestles for AEW's sister promotion Ring of Honor (ROH), where he is a former one-time ROH World Television Champion. He is also makes appearances for AEW's partner promotion Consejo Mundial de Lucha Libre (CMLL). He is also known for his time with Lucha Libre AAA Worldwide (AAA), where he is a former one-time AAA World Cruiserweight Champion and one-time AAA World Tag Team Champion.

Komander debuted in 2012, competing for local Reynosa-based promotions. He would later begin appearing for notable promotions in Mexico such as Lucha Memes, MDA Lucha Libre, War City Wrestling, and AAA. In 2022, he began wrestling in the United States, notably for Game Changer Wrestling, before signing with the U.S.-based AEW promotion in 2023.

In professional wrestling, he is known for his complex high-flying maneuvers, which has earned him the nickname "El As del Espacio" (meaning "The Ace of Space"). He also uses a theme song named titled ¿Quién anda ahí? ("Who's there?"), which he rapped and produced himself.

== Professional wrestling career ==
=== Mexican independent circuit (2012–present) ===
Komander started training early for a first-generation wrestler – stating in one interview that he started practicing his signature rope walk at age 12. He made his debut in 2012, working matches in his hometown Reynosa, as well as in Rio Bravo, Matamoros, and Parras de la Fuente. He wrestled in all three of the big venues in Reynosa, Arena Juba, Arena Deportivo Reynosa (formerly Arena el Angel), and most importantly Arena Coliseo Reynosa. He was quickly booked by War City Wrestling (War City), a regional wrestling promotion based in Reynosa. In War City, Komander became regarded as a highly skilled flying wrestler known for his various complex and creative "rope tricks".

In 2014, he formed the group Reyes del Aire del Reynosa with Rey Astral and Magnifico, later winning the War City Trios Championship the following year. In 2015, Komander and Ronaldinho feuded over the War City Cruiserweight Championship. On October 4, 2015, he defeated Ronaldinho in a Mask vs. Hair match to retain the Cruiserweight title. He would later lose the title to Ronaldinho.

In 2017, Komander decided to focus full time on being a wrestler and started looking for bookings all over Mexico, expanding out of the Reynosa area. In May, Komander made his Mexico City debut after being discovered by the Lucha Memes promotion. He lost his debut match for the promotion, being defeated by Eterno in Arena Coliseo Coacalco. He continued to wrestle for Lucha Memes in 2018. On June 3, Komander faced Iron Kid in a match on a Lucha Memes event that ended in a no-contest as Komander needed medical attention.

Throughout 2018 and 2019, Komander began wrestling in Monterrey, taking part in events promoted by Monterrey-based promotions such as MDA Lucha Libre and Kaoz Lucha Libre among others. In 2019, he took part in a torneo cibernetico elimination match as part of the Battle of Naucalpan show, co-promoted by Lucha Memes and MexaWrestling.

In August 2020, he participated in Kaoz Lucha Libre's Luchando por un Sueño tournament, in which he was teamed with Dulce Canela. The team made it to the finals of the tournament where they were defeated by the team of Emperador Azteca and Zeuxis. On November 15, Komander made his debut for the International Wrestling Revolution Group (IWRG), one of the major promotions in Mexico.

In early 2021, Komander joined Big Lucha, a gym and promotion run by fellow professional wrestler Bandido. On June 20, at a Kaoz Lucha Libre and Lucha Libre AAA Worldwide co-promoted event at Estadio Mobil Super, Komander defeated Toxin, Villano III Jr., Charro Negro, and Dinamico in a five-way match to win the Kaoz Junior Cruiserweight Championship. At a Big Lucha event on August 29, Komander suffered a knee ligament injury during a match with Emperador Azteca. After undergoing successful surgery, it was announced he would be out of action for the rest of the year. However, he would end up returning early from injury, wrestling his return match in mid-November.

On June 2, 2022, he would lose the Kaoz Junior Cruiserweight Championship to Dinamico during a six-way match at IWRG's Villanos vs. Brazos event.

=== Lucha Libre AAA Worldwide (2015; 2019–2024) ===
Komander made his Lucha Libre AAA Worldwide (AAA) debut in 2015, wrestling in a dark match during a AAA Sin Limite taping in his hometown of Reynosa.

Komander was intended to make his official debut for AAA on June 9, 2019 in Monterrey but was replaced by another wrestler for unknown reasons. The following month on July 21, he wrestled a match for Pro Wrestling Mexico, AAA's Monterrey-based promotional partner. Komander made his AAA television debut on August 10 in Saltillo, teaming with Eclipse Jr. and Lady Shani to defeat Villano III Jr., Australian Suicide, and La Hiedra.

On July 2, 2021, at Verano de Escándalo in Tequisquiapan, Querétaro, Komander made his first appearance on a AAA major event, participating in the Trofeo Alas de Oro match, which was won by El Hijo del Vikingo. After Verano de Escándalo, Komander began receiving more frequent bookings from AAA, going from appearing for the promotion once every few months to wrestling on most AAA televised events. On April 30, 2022, at Triplemanía XXX: Monterrey, Komander teamed with Sexy Star II in a four-way mixed tag team match for the AAA World Mixed Tag Team Championship, which was won by Tay Conti and Sammy Guevara. On August 20, at Saltillomania, Komander teamed up with Aero Star and Baby Extreme to defeat Argenis, La Parka Negra, and Villano III Jr.

On April 16, 2023, at Triplemanía XXXI: Monterrey, Komander participated in the main event four-way match, which was won by AAA Mega Champion Hijo del Vikingo. On May 20, Komander and Arez defeated Rey Horus and Octagón Jr. and Jack Evans and Myzteziz Jr. in a four-way tag team match during a television taping to win the vacant AAA World Tag Team Championship. On September 23, Komander defeated Kuukai, La Estrella, Mecha Wolf in a four-way elimination match to win the AAA Cruiserweight Championship for the first time On November 19, Komander and Arez lost their titles to Nueva Generacion Dinamita (Forastero and Sanson), ending their reign at 183 days.

On August 17, 2024 at Triplemanía XXXII: Mexico City, Komander lost the AAA Cruiserweight Championship to Matt Riddle in a three-way match, also involving Laredo Kid.

=== United States independent circuit (2022–present) ===
Komander made his United States debut on June 18, 2022, for Game Changer Wrestling (GCW) at their New York City event You Wouldn't Understand, participating in a seven-way scramble match. The following day in Providence, Rhode Island, at I Never Liked You, he would team up with Ciclope and Miedo Extremo in a losing effort against ASF, Drago Kid, and Gringo Loco. On June 30, he was one of the competitors in the Bunkhouse Battle Royal match at the Ric Flair's Last Match event, which was won by Mance Warner. Komander would return to GCW the following month, losing to Tony Deppen on July 15 at No Signal In The Hills 2 in Los Angeles. Two days later, at the Back To The Bay event, he would lose to Gringo Loco.

On July 29 at GCW's The People vs. GCW event, Komander would team with Laredo Kid and ASF, in a losing effort against Black Taurus, Gringo Loco, and Jack Cartwheel. On August 18 and 19, he competed in the West Coast Cup tournament organized by West Coast Pro Wrestling. In the first round, he would defeat Midas Kreed, and then advance directly to the semi-final due to his quarter-final opponent Vinnie Massaro being unable to compete due to injury. He was eliminated in the semi-final by Starboy Charlie.

Throughout 2022 and early 2023, he appeared for the Ohio-based Absolute Intense Wrestling, the Chicago-based GALLI Lucha Libre, and the Corpus Christi-based 3Bat Promotions groups.

=== Japan (2022–present) ===
Komander appeared for Gleat on October 9, 2022 during the promotion's Ver. Extra event in Korakuen Hall, marking his Japanese debut. At the event, he teamed with Bandido to defeat the team of Kaz Hayashi and Soma Watanabe.

=== All Elite Wrestling / Ring of Honor (2023–present) ===
On March 1, 2023 episode of Dynamite, Komander debuted for All Elite Wrestling (AEW), taking part in the Face of the Revolution ladder match, which was won by Powerhouse Hobbs. Komander made his debut for AEW's sister promotion Ring of Honor (ROH), on March 31 at Supercard of Honor, challenging El Hijo del Vikingo, for the AAA Mega Championship in a losing effort. On April 19, AEW founder and co-owner Tony Khan announced that Komander had signed with AEW. On the October 7 episode of Collision, Komander unsuccessfully challenged Eddie Kingston for the ROH World Championship. On December 15 at Final Battle, Komander took part in a Survival of the Fittest for the vacant ROH World Television Championship, which was won by Kyle Fletcher.

On September 28, 2024 at the Collision edition of Grand Slam, Komander and Private Party unsuccessfully challenged the Death Riders for the AEW World Trios Championship. On December 3, Komander was announced as an alternate in the Gold league of the 2024 Continental Classic, replacing the injured Juice Robinson. On December 20 at Final Battle, Komander defeated AR Fox, Blake Christian, Brian Cage, Mark Davis, and Willie Mack in a Survival of the Fittest to win the ROH World Television Championship. Komander finished the 2024 Continental Classic with 3 points and failed to advance the playoff stage. In early 2025, Komander formed a tag team with Hologram, known as Los Titanes del Aire, which translates to "The Titans of The Air". On the April 17, 2025 episode of Collision at the Spring BreakThru, Komander lost his title to Nick Wayne, ending his reign at 119 days. On June 11 at the Dynamite edition of Summer Blockbuster, Komander was attacked by The Hurt Syndicate in a backstage segment, removing him from a scheduled match that night. This was done to write him off as he had suffered a legitimate injury. Komander returned on the September 25 episode of Ring of Honor Wrestling, where Los Titanes del Aire saved Bandido from an attack by The Swirl (Blake Christian and Lee Johnson).

=== Consejo Mundial de Lucha Libre (2025–present) ===
On March 21, 2025, Komander and Hologram made their Consejo Mundial de Lucha Libre (CMLL) debut at Homenaje a Dos Leyendas, where they faced Místico and Máscara Dorada in a losing effort. On January 18, 2026 at Fin De Semana Internacional, Komander unsuccessfully challenged Titán for the CMLL World Welterweight Championship.

== Personal life ==
Komander was born premature and nearly died twice as an infant.

Komander's real name is not a matter of public record, as is often the case with masked wrestlers in Mexico where private lives are kept a secret from wrestling fans.

== Championships and accomplishments ==
- Kaoz Lucha Libre
  - Kaoz Junior Cruiserweight Championship (1 time)
- Lucha Libre AAA Worldwide
  - AAA World Cruiserweight Championship (1 time)
  - AAA World Tag Team Championship (1 time) – with Arez
- Pro Wrestling Illustrated
  - Ranked No. 97 of the top 500 singles wrestlers in the PWI 500 in 2025
- Ring of Honor
  - ROH World Television Championship (1 time)
- War City Wrestling
  - War City Cruiserweight Championship (3 times)
  - War City Tag Team Championship (1 time) – with Angel-O
  - War City Trios Championship (2 times) – with Rey Astral and Magnifico

== Luchas de Apuestas record ==
Winner (wager)	Loser (wager)	Location	Event	Date	Notes
Komander (mask)	Ronaldinho (hair)	Reynosa, Tamaulipas	Arena Coliseo Reynosa	October 4, 2015	(Note: Komander's War City Cruiserweight Championship was also on the line during this match.)
Komander (mask)	Mini Espiritu (hair)	Zacatecas	Ruleta de la Muerte	April 2, 2017	
