= Mr. Iguana =

Mexican professional wrestler (born 1988)

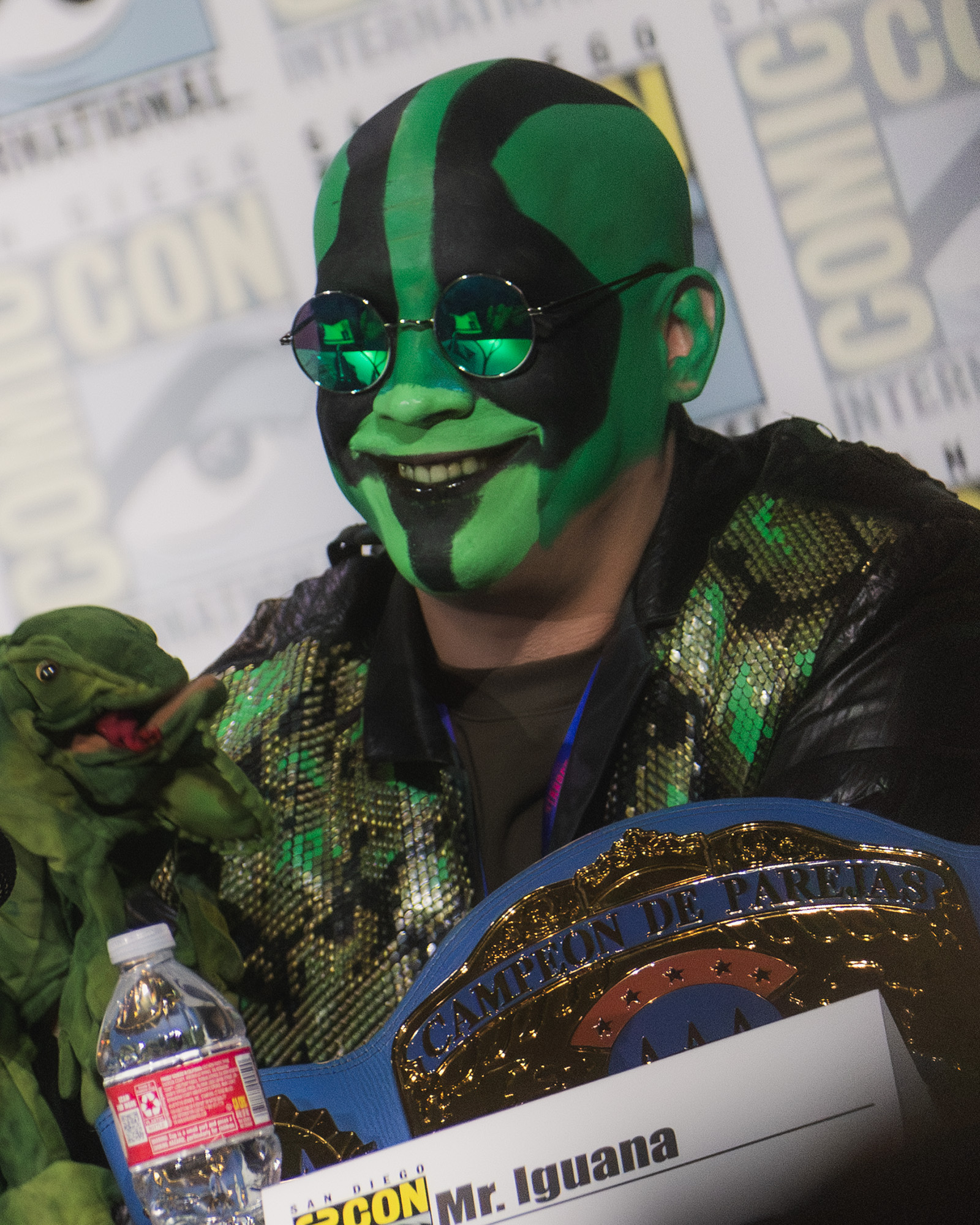
- Mr. Iguana in 2026

Personal information
- Born: Santiago Ibarra Calderón; 20 July 1988 (age 38) Culiacán, Sinaloa, Mexico

Professional wrestling career
- Ring name: Mr. Iguana
- Billed height: 173 cm (5 ft 8 in)
- Billed weight: 74 kg (163 lb)
- Billed from: Culiacán, Sinaloa, México
- Debut: 2009

Santiago Ibarra Calderón (born 20 July 1988), better known by his ring name Mr. Iguana, is a Mexican professional wrestler.

He began wrestling independent circuits in Mexico in 2009. In 2015, he began a brief and limited stint in Consejo Mundial de Lucha Libre (CMLL). In 2018, he joined KAOZ Lucha Libre and the U.S. independent promotion Combat Zone Wrestling (CZW). That year, he also began making appearances in Lucha Libre AAA Worldwide (AAA); Mr. Iguana subsequently signed a contract with the promotion in 2020.

In 2021, he won the Copa Bardahl battle royal at Triplemanía XXIX, and in 2024 he won the AAA World Mixed Tag Team Championship for the first time with La Hiedra. After its acquisition of AAA, Mr. Iguana made his WWE debut in June 2025 during its joint event Worlds Collide. Following a positive fan response, he began to make occasional appearances at other WWE shows, primarily to challenge AAA and NXT championships. In 2026, he began a second reign of the AAA World Mixed Tag Team Championship, this time with Lola Vice.

== Professional wrestling career ==
After receiving a degree in communication studies, Ibarra trained for a professional wrestling career in Culiacán and made his debut on the Mexican independent circuit in 2009. His earliest documented match saw him defeat Frank el Payaso at a show in Teocelo on 20 December. At a Promociones PC show on 17 April 2010, Mr. Iguana, Psiclope and Relampago lost to Mega Black, Monster Truck and Muralla Negra in a match for the vacant Pacific Coast Trios Championship. Mr. Iguana achieved his first major victory on 24 September, winning a 10-man torneo cibernetico elimination match by last eliminating Mario Mora.

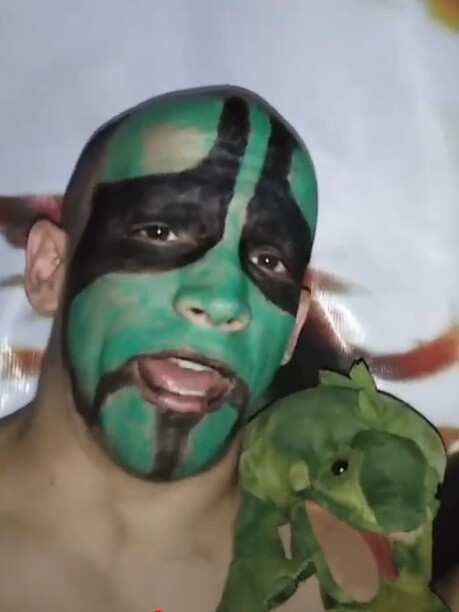
Mr. Iguana in 2019

On 20 May 2018, Mr. Iguana debuted for the Monterrey-based promotion KAOZ Lucha Libre, teaming with Fresero Jr. to defeat El Divo and Silver Tiger. Two months later, he debuted in the United States for Combat Zone Wrestling (CZW), with his most notable match taking place on 28 July, when he and Arez unsuccessfully challenged The REP (Dave McCall and Nate Carter) for the CZW World Tag Team Championship. On 15 March 2019, Mr. Iguana and Fresero Jr. defeated La Secta ("The Sect"; Cuervo and Escoria) to win the Lucha Libre Real (LLR) Tag Team Championship. On 5 April, he appeared at Joey Ryan's Penis Party, where he was involved in a six-way match that was won by Último Dragón. The next night, at WrestlePro Vs. CZW, he unsuccessfully challenged Jordan Oliver for the CZW Wired Championship in a fatal four-way match also involving Gary Jay and Jaxson Stone. At some point in the year, Mr. Iguana and Fresero Jr. became the inaugural holders of the KAOZ Tag Team Championship, which they lost on 19 May to La Secta. On 23 April 2021, he won the KAOZ Mixed Tag Team Championship with Reina Dorada by defeating Ayako Hamada and El Divo, holding the titles until they were declared vacant on 25 December 2023.

=== Consejo Mundial de Lucha Libre (2015, 2017) ===
Mr. Iguana made his first appearance for Consejo Mundial de Lucha Libre (CMLL) on 11 October 2015, teaming with Lycan and Magnum in a loss to Monster Truck, Rey Trueno, and Siniestro. He did not make his next appearance until 29 January 2017, when he, Carlo Roggi and Guerrero de la Muerte were defeated by Black Sugar, Capitan Cobra and Yaqui. He made his final appearance on 15 October, teaming with Cosmos to defeat Destructor and Quka. Mr. Iguana has stated that he was rejected by CMLL due to his slim physique.

=== Lucha Libre AAA Worldwide / WWE (2018–present) ===
Mr. Iguana initially appeared for Lucha Libre AAA Worldwide (AAA) on 6 October 2018, teaming with Muerte Extrema in a three-way tag team match that was won by Demenzia and Epydemius. He made his official AAA debut at Conquista Total Gira ("Total Conquest Tour") on 5 October 2019, losing to Eclipse Jr. in a three-way match also involving Iron Kid. At Triplemanía Regia on 1 December, he was part of the Copa Triplemanía Regia match, which was won by Niño Hamburguesa. He teamed with Hamburguesa and Mascarita Dorada to defeat Demus, Látigo and Villano III Jr. on 14 December at Guerra de Titanes.

On 17 January 2020, Mr. Iguana signed a three-year contract with AAA, becoming the first Sinaloan to do so. In April, Mr. Iguana competed in the Lucha Fighter tournament, but lost to Dr. Wagner Jr. in the first round. At Triplemanía XXVIII on 12 December, he teamed with Dinastía and Máximo in a loss to Poder del Norte (Tito Santana, Carta Brava Jr. and Mocho Cota Jr.). On 14 August 2021 at Triplemanía XXIX, Mr. Iguana won the Copa Bardahl by last eliminating Brava Jr. After the match, he, Aramís and Octagon Jr. were attacked by the debuting Nueva Generación Dinamita (El Cuatrero, Forastero and Sansón), who defeated them in a six-man tag team match on 30 October. At Triplemanía XXXI: Tijuana on 15 July 2023, Mr. Iguana competed in the Tijuana Cup match; despite being eliminated, he helped La Hiedra eliminate Lady Flammer to win. On 8 December 2024, they defeated Crazzy Steve and Havok to win the AAA World Mixed Tag Team Championship. At Rey de Reyes on 25 March 2025, he lost to El Mesías in the fatal four-way semi-final tournament match also involving Pimpinela Escarlata and Panic Clown.

Following WWE's acquisition of AAA in 2025, Mr. Iguana was announced for the joint Worlds Collide event on 7 June, where he teamed with Octagón Jr. and Aero Star to defeat Latino World Order (Dragon Lee and Cruz Del Toro) and Lince Dorado. After his appearance at the event, Iguana captured fan attention, resulting in him making cameo appearances at Money in the Bank and on the following episode of WWE Raw. On the 1 August episode of WWE SmackDown, Mr. Iguana and Psycho Clown unsuccessfully challenged Los Garzas (Angel and Berto) for the AAA World Tag Team Championship. At Triplemanía XXXIII on 16 August, The Judgment Day (Finn Bálor, JD McDonagh, and Raquel Rodriguez) defeated Mr. Iguana, Niño Hamburguesa, and Lola Vice in a mixed trios match. A rematch was scheduled for Worlds Collide: Las Vegas on 12 September, where Mr. Iguana and Vice defeated Bálor and Rodriguez in a mixed tag team match. On 2 November, Mr. Iguana and La Hiedra lost their AAA World Mixed Tag Team Championship to Chelsea Green and Ethan Page, ending their reign at 329 days. At NXT Deadline on 6 December, he unsuccessfully challenged Page for the NXT North American Championship.

At WWE's Royal Rumble on 31 January 2026, Mr. Iguana made his men's Royal Rumble match debut as the ninth entrant and was eliminated by Trick Williams. On 7 February episode of AAA on Fox, Mr. Iguana and Lola Vice defeated Page and La Hiedra (substituting for an injured Green) to win the AAA World Mixed Tag Team Championship.

At Triplemanía 34 Night 1 on 11 September 2026, Mr. Iguana and Laredo Kid lost a triple threat match to La Parka, who retained his AAA Latin American Championship. At Worlds Collide: Chicago on 26 September 2026, a team of Mr. Iguana, La Parka, Adelicious, and Mascarita Sagrada defeated The Vanity Project and Mini Abismo Negro in a Relevos Atómicos de Locura. At Heroes Inmortales 2026 , Iguana alongside La Parka and Nińo Hamburguesa challenge for Los Perros trios title, but were unsuccessful.

== Professional wrestling persona ==
Ibarra created the Mr. Iguana character while playing WWE video games on his PlayStation, picking the name Mr. Iguana since there were wrestlers named Mr. Águila and Mr. Niebla. The character was inspired by iguanas, a common animal from his hometown, Culiacán; Ibarra has noted how "they dive like wrestlers into a plank, like in the old movies, like Santo and (Blue) Demon". He uses green face paint after the wrestlers Jeff Hardy and The Great Muta. He also carries a plushie iguana called "La Yezka".

== Other media ==
Ibarra made his first video game appearance in WWE 2K26.

== Championships and accomplishments ==
- Canna Pro Wrestling
  - Canna Pro Championship (1 time)
- KAOZ Lucha Libre
  - KAOZ Mixed Tag Team Championship (1 time) – with Reina Dorada
  - KAOZ Tag Team Championship (1 time, inaugural) – with Fresero Jr.
- Lucha Libre AAA Worldwide
  - AAA World Mixed Tag Team Championship (2 times) – with La Hiedra (1), Lola Vice (1)
  - Copa Bardahl (2021)
- Lucha Libre Real
  - LLR Tag Team Championship (1 time) – with Fresero Jr.
