= Triplemanía XXX =

2022 Lucha Libre AAA Worldwide event

- Promotional poster for the Monterrey event featuring various AAA luchadores and luchadoras
- Promotion: Lucha Libre AAA Worldwide
- Date: April 30, June 18, and October 15, 2022
- City: Monterrey, Mexico (April 30); Tijuana, Mexico (June 18); Azcapotzalco, Mexico City, Mexico (October 15)
- Venue: Mobil Super Stadium (April 30); Club Tijuana Stadium (June 18); Mexico City Arena (October 15)
- Attendance: Night 1: 13,637; Night 2: 16,400; Night 3: 14,100; Combined: 44,137
- Tagline(s): Ruleta de la Muerte (Spanish for: Death Roulette)

Event chronology
← Previous; AAA Invades WrestleCon	Next → Verano de Escándalo

Triplemanía chronology
← Previous; Regia II	Next → XXXI

Triplemanía XXX was a three-day professional wrestling pay-per-view (PPV) event promoted and produced by the Mexican professional wrestling promotion Lucha Libre AAA Worldwide (AAA or Triple A). The event was held on April 30, June 18, and October 15, 2022. The April 30 event took place at Mobil Super Stadiim in Monterrey, the June 18 event took place at Club Tijuana Stadium in Tijuana and the October 15 event took place at Mexico City Arena in Mexico City. It marked the 30th year in a row that AAA has held a Triplemanía show and comprised the 37th, 38th, and 39th overall shows held under the Triplemanía banner since 1993. The annual Triplemanía show is AAA's biggest event of the year, serving as the culmination of major storylines in what has been described as AAA's version of WrestleMania or their Super Bowl event. Held as part of AAA's 30th Anniversary Tour, Triplemanía XXX was the first Triplemanía event since 1996 to be held across three days. The event aired on PPV via the FITE TV service.

The event was themed around the Ruleta de la Muerte tournament, in which eight luchadores enmascarados wrestled in a series of matches where the losers advanced to a Lucha de Apuestas Mask vs. Mask match on the third day of the event. In the finals, Pentagón Jr. defeated Villano IV to successfully defend his mask and win the mask of Villano.

== Production ==
=== Background ===
2022 marked the 30th year that the Mexican professional wrestling company Lucha Libre AAA Worldwide (Triple A or AAA) has held their annual flagship Triplemanía show. Triplemanía XXX comprised three shows – the 37th, 38th, and 39th overall Triplemanía shows promoted by AAA (AAA promoted more than one Triplemanía event from 1994 to 1997 and from 2019 onward). Since the 2012 event, Triplemanía has taken place at the Arena Ciudad de México (Mexico City Arena), an indoor arena in Azcapotzalco, Mexico City, Mexico that has a maximum capacity of 22,300 spectators. On January 25, 2022, AAA announced that Triplemanía XXX would be held across three days in three cities. In addition to Arena Ciudad de México, Triplemanía XXX was held in Estadio de Béisbol Monterrey and Estadio Caliente Xoloitzcuintles. Triplemanía XXX was the second Triplemanía event held outside of Arena Ciudad de México during the 2020s and the third outside Mexico City since 2007.

Triplemanía is the company's biggest show of the year, the AAA equivalent of WWE's WrestleMania or New Japan Pro-Wrestling's Wrestle Kingdom event.

=== Storylines ===
Triplemanía XXX featured 25 professional wrestling matches across the three nights, with different wrestlers involved in pre-existing scripted feuds, plots and storylines. Wrestlers portrayed either heels (referred to as rudos in Mexico, those that portray the "bad guys") or faces (técnicos in Mexico, the "good guy" characters) as they engaged in a series of tension-building events, which culminated in a wrestling match.

During a press conference on January 25, 2022, AAA announced that Triplemanía XXX would be themed around the Ruleta de la Muerte tournament in which eight luchadores enmascarados will wrestle in a series of matches where the losers will advance to a Lucha de Apuestas Mask vs. Mask match on the third day of the event. The participants of the tournament where revealed to be Último Dragón, Blue Demon Jr., Psycho Clown, Pentagón Jr., L. A. Park, Villano IV, Canek, and Rayo de Jalisco Jr.

During a press conference on March 19, 2022, AAA announced that a Steel Cage match featuring multiple luchadoras enmascaradas would occur at the Triplemanía XXX: Tijuana event. The last two luchadoras who do not escape from the cage will compete in a Lucha de Apuestas Mask vs. Mask match. The participants in the match were revealed as Lady Shani, La Hiedra, Flammer, Maravilla, Chik Tormenta, Reina Dorada, and Sexy Star II.

== Results ==
=== Triplemanía XXX: Monterrey (April 30) ===
No.	Results	Stipulations	Times
1^{D}	El Leyenda Americana and El Furioso defeated Terror Púrpura by pinfall	2-on-1 handicap match This was the Marvel Lucha Libre Edition exhibition match	—
2^{D}	Micro Man defeated Heavy Metal, Faby Apache, Willie Mack, Charly Manson, Toscano, La Diva Salvaje, Jessy, Dulce Canela, La Hiedra, and Lady Shani (Note: Micro Man won by last eliminating Faby Apache and Heavy Metal.)	Lumberjacks with Straps match for the Triplemanía XXX: Monterrey Cup	—
3	Ultimo Dragon defeated Pentagón Jr. by pinfall. Pentagón Jr. is relegated to the next round of Ruleta de la Muerta.	Singles match Ruleta de la Muerte first round. Loser relegated to next round.	9:19
4	Tay Conti and Sammy Guevara defeated Los Vipers (Chik Tormenta and Arez) (c), Maravilla and Látigo, and Sexy Star II and Komander by pinfall (Note: La Parka Negra wrestled the majority of the match in place of Sammy Guevara, but Guevara and Tay Conti were acknowledged as the participants and winners of the match.)	Four-way mixed tag team match for the AAA World Mixed Tag Team Championship	12:35
5	L.A. Park defeated Villano IV by pinfall, Villano IV is relegated to the next round of Ruleta de la Muerta.	Singles match Ruleta de la Muerte first round. Loser relegated to next round.	18:01
6	Taurus and Johnny Caballero defeated Los Hermanos Lee (Dragon Lee and Dralístico) and Laredo Kid and Jack Cartwheel by pinfall	Three-way tag team match	13:29
7	Rayo de Jalisco Jr. defeated Blue Demon Jr. by pinfall. Blue Demon Jr. is relegated to the next round of Ruleta de la Muerta.	Singles match Ruleta de la Muerte first round. Loser relegated to next round.	14:18
8	Pagano, Bandido, and Taya defeated Cibernético, Andrade "El Ídolo", and Deonna Purrazzo (with José the Assistant) by disqualification	Trios match	18:53
9	Canek defeated Psycho Clown by pinfall. Psycho Clown is relegated to the next round of Ruleta de la Muerta.	Singles match Ruleta de la Muerte first round. Loser relegated to next round.	13:08
10	The Young Bucks (Matt Jackson and Nick Jackson) (with Konnan) defeated Hijo del Vikingo and Fénix by pinfall	Tag team match	15:58
(c) / – the champion(s) heading into the match; D / – this was a dark match

=== Triplemanía XXX: Tijuana (June 18) ===
No.	Results	Stipulations	Times
1	Lady Shani, La Hiedra, Maravilla, Sexy Star II, and Reina Dorada defeated Flammer and Chik Tormenta by escaping the cage. Flammer and Chik Tormenta were relegated to the Lucha de Apuestas Mask vs. Mask match later in the card.	Seven-woman Steel Cage match	23:32
2	Niño Hamburguesa defeated Mr. Iguana, Abismo Negro Jr., Bestia 666, Charly Manson, Cibernético, Dulce Canela, Heavy Metal, Mecha Wolf, Pagano, Rey Xolo, Vampiro, and Mamba (Note: Niño Hamburguesa won by last eliminating Mamba.)	13-man Triplemanía XXX: Tijuana Cup match	21:57
3	Fénix defeated Laredo Kid (c - World Cruiserweight), Taurus (c - Latin American), Bandido, and Hijo del Vikingo by pinfall	Five-way match for the AAA World Cruiserweight and Latin American Championships	20:37
4	Blue Demon Jr. defeated Pentagón Jr. by pinfall. Pentagón Jr. is relegated to final round of Ruleta de la Muerta.	Singles match Ruleta de la Muerte semi-finals. Losers relegated to final.	11:52
5	Flammer defeated Chik Tormenta by pinfall	Lucha de Apuestas Mask vs. Mask match Was held between the final two participants in the women's Steel Cage match	12:58
6	Psycho Clown defeated Villano IV by pinfall. Villano IV is relegated to final round of Ruleta de la Muerta.	Singles match Ruleta de la Muerte semi-finals. Losers relegated to final.	17:19
7	Los Hermanos Lee (Dragon Lee and Dralístico) defeated Matt Hardy and Johnny Hardy by pinfall (Note: Originally, the opponents for Los Hermanos Lee were to be Matt and Jeff Hardy. However, following Jeff's arrest for driving under the influence on June 13, 2022, he was removed from the event. Matt Hardy introduced Jeff's replacement during the show to be Johnny Caballero, who was billed as "Johnny Hardy".)	Tag team match	13:35

=== Triplemanía XXX: Mexico City (October 15) ===
No.	Results	Stipulations	Times
1^{D}	Team El Leyenda Americana (El Leyenda Americana, Estrella Cósmica, Engañoso, Gran Mazo, and Aracno) defeated Team Terror Púrpura (Terror Púrpura, Picadura Letal, Venenoide, El Furioso, and Simbosis Mortal) by pinfall	Ten-person tag team match This was the Marvel Lucha Libre Edition exhibition match	—
2^{D}	Taurus defeated Electroshock, Chessman, Sexy Star II, Niño Hamburguesa, Mr. Iguana, Lady Shani, Flip Gordon, La Diva Salvaje, Jessy, Aero Star, La Hiedra, and Jack Evans (Note: Taurus won by last eliminating Electroshock.)	13-person Bardahl Cup Triplemanía XXX match	—
3	Los Hermanos Lee (Dragon Lee and Dralístico) defeated Arez and Willie Mack, Myzteziz Jr. and Komander, and Los Vipers (Toxin and Látigo) by pinfall	Four-way tag team match Winners received a future AAA World Tag Team Championship match	9:00
4	Taya (c) (with Arez) defeated Kamille (with Flammer) by submission	Singles match for the AAA Reina de Reinas Championship	15:18
5	Brian Cage, Sam Adonis, and Johnny Caballero (with Estrellita) defeated Psycho Clown, Laredo Kid, and Bandido and Nueva Generación Dinamita (El Cuatrero, Sansón, and Forastero) (c) by pinfall	Three-way trios match for the AAA World Trios Championship; The incumbent champion,Nueva Generación Dinamita, must be pinned or submitted in order for the title to change hands. Laredo Kid, not a member of the incumbent champion, was pinned, hence Nueva Generación Dinamita retained their titles	12:44
6	Pagano defeated Cibernético (with Abismo Negro Jr., Látigo, and Toxin) by pinfall	Lucha de Apuestas Hair vs. Hair match	21:43
7	Hijo del Vikingo (c) defeated Fénix by pinfall	Singles match for the AAA Mega Championship	19:27
8	Pentagón Jr. (with Arez) defeated Villano IV (with Villano V) by pinfall	Lucha de Apuestas Mask vs. Mask match Ruleta de la Muerte finals	25:30
(c) / – the champion(s) heading into the match; D / – this was a dark match

== Ruleta de la Muerte bracket ==
The losers of each match were relegated to the next round. The tournament final was a Lucha de Apuestas Máscara contra Máscara match.

1st Round; Triplemanía XXX: Monterrey; April 30, 2022
Rayo de Jalisco Jr.	Pinfall
Blue Demon Jr.	14:18
Pentagón Jr.	9:19
Último Dragón	Pinfall
Canek	Pinfall
Psycho Clown	13:08
L.A. Park	Pinfall
Villano IV	18:01

Semifinals; Triplemanía XXX: Tijuana; June 18, 2022
Blue Demon Jr.	Pinfall
Pentagón Jr.	11:52
Psycho Clown	Pinfall
Villano IV	17:19

Final; Triplemanía XXX: Mexico City; October 15, 2022
Pentagón Jr.	Pinfall
Villano IV	25:30

== Comentaristas ==
- Hugo Savinovich
- José Manuel Guillén
- Carlos Cabrera

== See also ==
- 2022 in professional wrestling
