= Triplemanía XXIX =

2021 Lucha Libre AAA Worldwide event

- Promotional poster featuring various AAA luchadores and luchadoras
- Promotion: Lucha Libre AAA Worldwide
- Date: August 14, 2021
- City: Azcapotzalco, Mexico City, Mexico
- Venue: Arena Ciudad de México
- Attendance: 4,500
- Tagline(s): ¿De qué lado estás? (Spanish for: What side are you on?)

Event chronology
← Previous; Verano de Escándalo	Next → Héroes Inmortales XIV

Triplemanía chronology
← Previous; XXVIII	Next → Regia II

Triplemanía XXIX was a professional wrestling supercard event produced and scripted by the Mexican professional wrestling promotion Lucha Libre AAA Worldwide (AAA). The event took place on August 14, 2021, at Arena Ciudad de México in Mexico City. It marked the 29th year in a row that AAA has held a Triplemanía show, and the 35th overall show held under the Triplemanía banner since 1993. The annual Triplemanía show is AAA's biggest event of the year, serving as the culmination of major storylines in what has been described as AAA's version of WrestleMania or their Super Bowl event. The event saw the return of live ticketed fans, marking one of the first times AAA allowed this during the COVID-19 pandemic.

In the main event, Psycho Clown successfully defended his mask and won the hair of Rey Escorpión in a Lucha de Apuestas Mask vs. Hair match. In other prominent matches, Impact Knockouts Champion Deonna Purrazzo defeated AAA Reina de Reinas Champion Faby Apache to become a double champion, Los Lucha Bros (Fénix and Pentagón Jr.) defeated Jinetes del Aire (Hijo del Vikingo and Laredo Kid) and Taurus and Brian Cage in three-way tag team match to retain the AAA World Tag Team Championship, and Kenny Omega successfully defended the AAA Mega Championship against Andrade "El Ídolo".

The event also notably saw the AAA debuts of former Consejo Mundial de Lucha Libre luchadores Nueva Generación Dinamita (El Cuatrero, Sansón, and Forastero), who attacked Mr. Iguana after his victory in the Copa Bardahl Triplemanía XXIX match and aligned themselves with La Empresa, and WWE Hall of Famer Ric Flair, who accompanied Andrade "El Ídolo" to ringside during his match against Kenny Omega.

== Production ==
=== Background ===
2021 marked the 29th year that the Mexican professional wrestling company Lucha Libre AAA Worldwide (Triple A or AAA) will hold their annual flagship Triplemanía show. Triplemanía is the company's biggest show of the year, the AAA equivalent of WWE's WrestleMania or New Japan Pro-Wrestling's Wrestle Kingdom event. Triplemanía XXIX was the 35th overall Triplemanía show promoted by AAA (AAA promoted multiple Triplemanía shows over the summers of 1994 to 1997). Since the 2012 event, Triplemanía has taken place at the Arena Ciudad de México (Mexico City Arena), an indoor arena in Azcapotzalco, Mexico City, Mexico that has a maximum capacity of 22,300 spectators.

=== Storylines ===
Triplemanía XXIX featured seven professional wrestling matches, with different wrestlers involved in pre-existing scripted feuds, plots and storylines. Wrestlers portrayed either heels (referred to as rudos in Mexico, those that portray the "bad guys") or faces (técnicos in Mexico, the "good guy" characters) as they engaged in a series of tension-building events, which culminated in a wrestling match.

On May 1, 2021, at Rey de Reyes, former WWE wrestler Andrade "El Ídolo" made his AAA debut, challenging Mega Champion Kenny Omega to a title match at Triplemanía. The match was made official after Omega accepted the challenge during a press conference on May 18.

At Rey de Reyes, Faby Apache won a six-way elimination match for the vacant Reina de Reinas Championship. After the match, Apache was confronted by Impact Knockouts Champion Deonna Purrazzo, who challenged Apache to a match at Triplemanía. A match for both the Reina de Reinas and Knockouts Championships was made official during a press conference on May 18.

On May 18, at a Triplemanía press conference, it was announced that Psycho Clown would face Rey Escorpión in a Lucha de Apuestas Mask vs. Hair match at the event.

== Results ==
No.	Results	Stipulations	Times
1	Team Leyenda Americana (Leyenda Americana, El Aracno, and La Estrella Cosmica) defeated Team Terror Púrpura (Terror Púrpura, Venenoide, and La Picadura Letal)	Trios match This was the Marvel Lucha Libre Edition exhibition match	12:33
2	Mr. Iguana defeated Myzteziz Jr., Carta Brava Jr., Aramis, Tito Santana, Drago, Niño Hamburguesa, Mocho Cota Jr., Pimpinela Escarlata, Villano III Jr., Mamba, and Argenis	Copa Bardahl Triplemanía XXIX match	18:35
3	Deonna Purrazzo (Impact) (with Lady Maravilla) defeated Faby Apache (AAA) (with Lady Shani) by submission	Champion vs. Champion match for the AAA Reina de Reinas and Impact Knockouts Championships	9:53
4	Los Lucha Bros (Fénix and Pentagón Jr.) (c) defeated Jinetes del Aire (Hijo del Vikingo and Laredo Kid) and Taurus and Brian Cage	Three-way tag team match for the AAA World Tag Team Championship	14:29
5	La Empresa (Puma King, Sam Adonis, and DMT Azul) defeated Team AAA (Pagano, Chessman, and Murder Clown)	Trios match	10:41
6	Kenny Omega (c) (with Konnan) defeated Andrade "El Ídolo" (with Ric Flair)	Singles match for the AAA Mega Championship	24:22
7	Psycho Clown (mask) (with Goya Kong) defeated Rey Escorpión (hair) (with Samoano, Taurus and La Hiedra)	Lucha de Apuestas Mask vs. Hair match	23:35
(c) / – the champion(s) heading into the match

== See also ==
- 2021 in professional wrestling
