= Triplemanía Regia =

2019 Lucha Libre AAA Worldwide event

- Promotional poster featuring Pagano, Blue Demon Jr., LA Park, Kenny Omega, Psycho Clown, and Lady Shani
- Promotion: Lucha Libre AAA Worldwide
- Date: December 1, 2019
- City: Monterrey, Mexico
- Venue: Estadio de Béisbol Monterrey
- Attendance: 15,000 (official); 14,350 (claimed)
- Tagline(s): ¡Echamos toda la carne al asador! (Spanish for: We throw all the meat on the grill!)

Event chronology
← Previous; Héroes Inmortales XIII	Next → Guerra de Titanes

Triplemanía chronology
← Previous; XXVII	Next → XXVIII

Triplemanía Regia was a professional wrestling event produced and scripted by the Mexican professional wrestling promotion Lucha Libre AAA Worldwide (AAA). The event took place at the Estadio de Béisbol Monterrey in Monterrey on December 1, 2019. It marked the 27th year in a row that AAA had held a Triplemanía show, and the 33rd overall show held under the Triplemanía banner since 1993. The annual Triplemanía show is AAA's biggest event of the year, serving as the culmination of major storylines in what has been described as AAA's version of WrestleMania or their Super Bowl.

In the main event match, Aero Star successfully defended his mask and won the mask of Monster Clown during an eight-man Lucha de Apuestas Steel Cage match. In other prominent matches, Kenny Omega successfully defended the AAA Mega Championship against the debuting Dragon Lee, Taya Valkyrie successfully defended the AAA Reina de Reinas Championship in a five-way match, and Niño Hamburguesa won the 2019 Copa Triplemanía Regia.

== Production ==
=== Background ===
2019 marked the 27th year that the Mexican professional wrestling company Lucha Libre AAA Worldwide (Triple A or AAA) has held their annual flagship Triplemanía show. Triplemanía Regia was the 33rd overall Triplemanía show promoted by AAA (AAA promoted multiple Triplemanía shows over the summers of 1994 to 1997). Since the 2012 event, Triplemanía had taken place at the Arena Ciudad de México (Mexico City Arena), an indoor arena in Azcapotzalco, Mexico City, Mexico that has a maximum capacity of 22,300 spectators. Triplemanía Regia was the first Triplemanía event held outside of Arena Ciudad de México since 2012 and the first outside Mexico City since 2007.

AAA's Triplemanía is their biggest show of the year, AAA's equivalent of WWE's WrestleMania or New Japan Pro-Wrestling's Wrestle Kingdom event.

=== Storylines ===
Triplemanía Regia featured eight professional wrestling matches, with different wrestlers involved in pre-existing scripted feuds, plots and storylines. Wrestlers portrayed either heels (referred to as rudos in Mexico, those that portray the "bad guys") or faces (técnicos in Mexico, the "good guy" characters) as they engaged in a series of tension-building events, which culminated in a wrestling match.

On October 30, 2019, AAA announced that All Elite Wrestling's Kenny Omega would be defending the AAA Mega Championship at the event. On November 7 at the Triplemanía Regia press conference, it was announced that Omega would face Dragon Lee, who will be making his AAA debut.

== Results ==
No.	Results	Stipulations
1	Lady Maravilla, Cassandro, Demus, and Dave the Clown defeated Big Mami, Pimpinela Escarlata, Mascarita Dorada, and Dinastía	Relevos Atómicos Increíbles match
2	La Familia Real (El Hijo de L.A. Park, L.A. Park Jr., and Hijo de Remo Banda) defeated Poder del Norte (Mocho Cota Jr., Tito Santana, and Carta Brava Jr.) by disqualification	Trios match
3	Taurus and Villano III Jr. defeated Octagón Jr. and Dulce Canela, El Hijo del Vikingo and Aramís, and Cage and Puma King	Four-way Tag team match
4	Niño Hamburguesa defeated Mamba, Mr. Iguana, Abismo Negro Jr., Michael Nakazawa, Super Fly, Australian Suicide, Averno, Murder Clown, and La Hiedra	Eleven-person Copa Triplemanía Regia match
5	Taya Valkyrie (c) defeated Faby Apache, Ayako Hamada, Keyra, and Lady Shani	Five-way match for the AAA Reina de Reinas Championship
6	Kenny Omega (c) defeated Dragon Lee	Singles match for the AAA Mega Championship
7	Rush defeated Pagano and L.A. Park	Three-way match
8	Aero Star (mask) defeated Monster Clown (mask); Also in the match: Psycho Clown, Blue Demon Jr., Dr. Wagner Jr., Texano Jr., Rey Escorpión, and Chessman	Eight-man Steel cage Lucha de Apuestas, Mask vs. Hair match
(c) / – the champion(s) heading into the match

== See also ==
- 2019 in professional wrestling
