= Triplemanía VIII =

2000 Lucha Libre AAA World Wide event

- The TV logo used when the show was broadcast on television with both the Mexican and the Japanese flag shown
- Promotion: AAA
- Date: July 5, 2000
- City: Tokyo, Japan
- Venue: Korakuen Hall
- Attendance: 1,700

Pay-per-view chronology
← Previous; Rey de Reyes	Next → Verano de Escándalo

Triplemanía chronology
← Previous; VII	Next → IX

Triplemanía VIII was the eighth Triplemanía professional wrestling show promoted by AAA. The show took place on July 5, 2000 in Tokyo, Japan. It was only the second show to take place outside Mexico and the first show to take place in Japan. The Main event featured an Eight-man "Atómicos" tag team match which saw AAA regulars team up with various Japanese wrestlers. The team of Octagón, Jushin Thunder Liger, Latin Lover, and El Alebrije took on Cibernético, Cima, Abismo Negro, and Electroshock.

== Production ==
=== Background ===
In early 1992 Antonio Peña was working as a booker and storyline writer for Consejo Mundial de Lucha Libre (CMLL), Mexico's largest and the world's oldest wrestling promotion, and was frustrated by CMLL's very conservative approach to professional wrestling, specifically the style of wrestling known as Lucha Libre (Spanish for "freestyle wrestling"). He joined forced with a number of younger, very talented wrestlers who felt like CMLL was not giving them the recognition they deserved and decided to split from CMLL to create Asistencia Asesoría y Administración, later simply known as "AAA" or Triple A. After making a deal with the Televisa television network AAA held their first show in April 1992. The following year Peña and AAA held their first Triplemanía event, building it into an annual event that would become AAA's Super Bowl event, similar to the WWE's WrestleMania being the biggest show of the year. The 2000 Triplemanía was the eight year in a row AAA held a Triplemanía show and the fifteenth overall show under the Triplemanía banner.

=== Storylines ===
The Triplemanía VIII show featured six professional wrestling matches with different wrestlers involved in pre-existing scripted feuds, plots and storylines. Wrestlers were portrayed as either heels (referred to as rudos in Mexico, those that portray the "bad guys") or faces (técnicos in Mexico, the "good guy" characters) as they followed a series of tension-building events, which culminated in a wrestling match or series of matches.

== Reception ==
John F. Molinaro from the Canoe.ca website wrote that the Triplemanía show that kicked off the tour was well received by the crowd.

== Aftermath ==
The rest of the AAA tour of Japan drew very low attendance figures, drawing only 409 in Nagoya and 507 in Kobe for the next two stops of the tour as AAA failed to gain the interest of the Japanese fans even by bringing in several well known Japanese wrestlers. AAA had plans to do further tours in Japan in 2001 but after drawing such low interest they dropped the plans for regular tours. AAA only made brief tours of Japan since then, teaming up with a Japanese promotion for the tours.

== Results ==
No.	Results	Stipulations	Times
1	Octagóncito defeated Mini Abismo Negro	Singles match	04:38
2	Gran Apache defeated Óscar Sevilla	Singles Match	11:04
3	El Oriental and Esther Moreno vs. Pentagón and Xóchitl Hamada ended in a double countout	Tag team match	12:14
4	Perro Aguayo Jr., El Alebrije, and Pathfinder defeated Los Vatos Locos (El Picudo, Charly Manson and Espíritu), Team Japan (Naomichi Marufuji, Minoru Tanaka and Genki Horiguchi) and Los Vipers (Histeria, Psicosis and Maniaco): Perro Aguayo, Jr. pinned Charly Manson; Naomichi Marufuji pinned Histeria; Perro Aguayo, Jr. pinned Genki Horiguchi	Four corners elimination match	12:33
5	Heavy Metal and Tiger Mask IV defeated Kick Boxer and Yoshinobu Kanemaru	Tag Team match	13:21
6	Octagón, Jushin Thunder Liger, Latin Lover, and Hector Garza defeated Cibernético, Cima, Abismo Negro, and Electroshock	Eight-man "Atómicos" tag team match	13:01
