= Lucha Invades NY =

2019 Lucha Libre AAA Worldwide event

- Promotional poster featuring Mascarita Sagrada, Psycho Clown, Blue Demon Jr., La Parka, and Lady Shani
- Promotion(s): Impact Wrestling; Lucha Libre AAA Worldwide
- Date: September 15, 2019
- City: New York City, New York
- Venue: Hulu Theater at Madison Square Garden
- Attendance: 3,000
- Buy rate: 60

Pay-per-view chronology
← Previous (AAA) Triplemanía XXVII (Impact Wrestling) Slammiversary XVII	Next → (AAA) Héroes Inmortales XIII (Impact Wrestling) Bound for Glory

Lucha Invades NY (also known as AAA Invading NY) was a professional wrestling pay-per-view (PPV) event produced and scripted by the Mexican professional wrestling promotion Lucha Libre AAA Worldwide (AAA), in partnership with Impact Wrestling. The event took place on September 15, 2019, at Madison Square Garden's Hulu Theater in New York City. This would be the last event held by AAA in the United States until 2025.

The event aired live on traditional PPV outlets and FITE TV in the US. On television, the event aired live on Space in Mexico and aired, via tape delay, in the US on AXS TV and El Rey.

== Production ==
=== Background ===
On June 5, 2018, it was reported that AAA secured two dates to run a show at Madison Square Garden (MSG) due to MSG executives being unhappy with WWE running rival venue Barclays Center instead of their venue.; this came after reports of MSG executives being more open to other wrestling promotions running events in the venue. Despite Lucha Invades NY initially being planned to be held in fall 2018, on June 22, 2018 Pro Wrestling Insider reported that AAA would push the show date back to September 2019. In April 2019, AAA held a press conference officially announcing that it would be running a show at MSG while additionally announcing that tickets would be available for sale on May 5. Lucha Invades NY was intended to be the second professional wrestling event held at MSG (the first being G1 Supercard) by a professional wrestling promotion not owned by the McMahon family since November 14, 1960.

It was later reported by Wrestling Observer Newsletter journalist Dave Meltzer that AAA initial ticket sales for the event were 2,000 tickets. On August 16, it was announced that the event would be held in the smaller Hulu Theater, which is located inside of MSG. Later it was reported by Pro Wrestling Insider that AAA's decision of running Hulu Theater was made two weeks before the announcement after they met with MSG executives.

=== Storylines ===
The show featured eight professional wrestling matches, with different wrestlers involved in pre-existing scripted feuds, plots and storylines. Wrestlers portray either heels (referred to as rudos in Mexico, those that portray the "bad guys") or faces (técnicos in Mexico, the "good guy" characters) as they follow a series of tension-building events, which culminate in wrestling matches.

In her return to Impact Wrestling on September 27, 2018, Taya Valkyrie challenged Tessa Blanchard to a title match for the Impact Knockouts Championship. At Bound for Glory, Blanchard retained the title by using the ring ropes. Three weeks later, Taya received a rematch, which was once again won by Blanchard who attacked the referee and got herself disqualified, retaining the title in the process. At Homecoming, which took place on January 6, 2019, Taya won the Impact Knockouts Championship after the special guest referee Gail Kim (whom Blanchard had attacked during their match) performed her finishing move that allowed Taya to execute her own finishing move before she pinned her. A rematch from Homecoming, this time for Blanchard's AAA Reina de Reinas Championship, was later signed for Lucha Invades NY.

On October 26, 2018, at Héroes Inmortales XII, Blue Demon Jr. betrayed Dr. Wagner Jr. during Wagner's match against Jeff Jarrett, which Wagner still won. In December, Blue Demon Jr. continued to cement his role as Wagner's rival. On February 10, 2019, Wagner emerged victorious against Blue Demon Jr. in a Street Fight and that same night, challenged Demon to a Lucha de Apuestas, a challenge that was not answered at the time. On February 27, AAA announced that Blue Demon Jr. and Wagner would face off in a Luchas de Apuestas as the main event of Triplemanía XXVII. At Triplemanía, Blue Demon Jr. defeated Wagner, forcing Wagner to shave his head. After the match Wagner announced his retirement from professional wrestling, however, the next day after Triplemanía XXVII, Wagner declared that it was not his last match as a wrestler and he would fulfill his commitments before his final retirement in 2020. A Triplemanía No DQ rematch was then announced for Lucha Invades NY.

In February 2019, former UFC heavyweight champion Cain Velasquez made statements branding Lucha Libre as "fake" and "a show without real blows." On March 26, at an AAA press conference, Velasquez announced that he had signed with the company and was then confronted by a group on AAA wrestlers, including Texano Jr. On July 2, AAA announced that a trios match pitting Velasquez, Psycho Clown, and Cody Rhodes against Los Mercenarios (Texano Jr. and Taurus) and a surprise partner was signed for Triplemanía XXVI. At the event, Velasquez's team was victorious. Velasquez's second match, which will see him team with Psycho Clown and Brian Cage against Los Mercenarios (Texano Jr., Taurus, and Rey Escorpión), was later announced for Lucha Invades NY.

== Results ==
No.	Results	Stipulations	Times
1	Chris Dickinson and Mascarita Dorada defeated Dave the Clown and Demus	Tag team match	8:35
2	Josh Alexander, Michael Elgin and Sami Callihan defeated Drago, Faby Apache and Murder Clown	Six-man tag team match	13:54
3	Daga defeated Puma King, Aerostar and Flamita	Four-way match to determine the No. 1 contender for the AAA World Cruiserweight Championship; As a result of pinning Puma King, Daga also won the DDT Ironman Heavymetalweight Championship	10:23
4	Taya Valkyrie defeated Tessa Blanchard (c)	Singles match for the AAA Reina de Reinas Championship	10:10
5	Lucha Brothers (Fénix and Pentagón Jr.) (c) defeated Ortiz and Santana	Tag team match for the AAA World Tag Team Championship	14:04
6	Brian Cage, Cain Velasquez and Psycho Clown defeated Los Mercenarios (Rey Escorpión, Texano Jr., and Taurus)	Six-man tag team match	12:58
7	Dr. Wagner Jr. defeated Blue Demon Jr.	No Disqualification match	10:29
(c) / – the champion(s) heading into the match

== See also ==
- 2019 in professional wrestling
