= Dulce Canela =

Mexican professional wrestler

Personal information
- Born: July 25, 1995 (age 31) Monterrey, Nuevo León, Mexico

Professional wrestling career
- Ring name(s): Dulce Canela; Dulce Kanela
- Billed height: 1.53 m (5 ft 0 in)
- Trained by: Golden Boy; Rosa Salvaje; Simbolo 2000; Rey Demonio Jr.
- Debut: 2011

Dulce Canela (born July 25, 1995, in Monterrey, Nuevo León) is a Mexican professional wrestler currently working with Lucha Libre AAA Worldwide (AAA) and WWE. Canela wrestles as an exótico character.

== Professional wrestling career ==
Canela has wrestled since at least 2011, early on mostly in Monterrey in arenas such as Arena Coliseo Monterrey and Arena El Jaguar as well as in other cities of northeastern Mexico.

On June 14, 2020, Canela won the Women's Championship of Monterrey-based promotion Kaoz Lucha Libre. Canela held the title for almost two years but dropped it to Reina Dorada at an International Wrestling Revolution Group event held on June 2, 2022.

=== Lucha Libre AAA Worldwide ===
Dulce Canela made his first appearance for AAA at a TV-taping in Veracruz November 30, 2019. The next day, he would be part of a 4-way Tag Team match at Triplemanía Regia.

He would return to AAA in the summer of 2021 and has been appearing regularly on TV-tapings since. He worked the Copa Triplemania cibernetico matches at the Triplemanía XXX events in Tijuana and in Monterrey.

Since July 2022, Canela has been part of the Las Shotas stable, an all exótico group with Jessy, Mamba and La Diva Salvaje.

== Personal life ==
Canela is openly homosexual, and claims that self defence training was the start of his love for combat sports and later professional wrestling.
