= Reina Dorada =

Mexican female professional wrestler

Personal information
- Born: Unrevealed (Note: Traditionally Mexican sources will not report on the birth name of a masked wrestler who has never been unmasked in the ring.); January 9, 1995 (age 31) Mexico City, Mexico

Professional wrestling career
- Ring names: Reyna Dorada; Reina Dorada
- Billed height: 1.57 m (5 ft 2 in)
- Billed weight: 53 kg (117 lb)
- Trained by: Máscara Año 2000
- Debut: May 13, 2013

Reina Dorada (Spanish for "Golden Queen"; born January 9, 1995) is the ring name of a Mexican professional wrestler. She is a freelancer working for the Mexican promotion Lucha Libre AAA Worldwide (AAA) as well as the independent circuit. Her real name is not a matter of public record, as is often the case with masked wrestlers in Mexico where their private lives are kept concealed from the general public.

Reina Dorada has been one of the biggest female names on the independent scene in Mexico City since the mid-2010s and has wrestled in major independent promotions such as Generación XXI and Caralucha, as well as occasional appearances in Consejo Mundial de Lucha Libre (CMLL). Since 2019, she has also been wrestling in Kaoz Lucha Libre, a partner of AAA. She has a background in taekwando and has a black belt.

== Professional wrestling career ==
Reina Dorada's birth name has not been revealed, nor reported on, which is a tradition in Mexico when a professional wrestler has not been unmasked.

== Championships and accomplishments ==
- KAOZ Lucha Libre

- KAOZ Women's Championship (1 time)
- KAOZ Mixed Tag Team Championship (1 time) – with Mr. Iguana
