= El Hijo del Vikingo =

Mexican professional wrestler

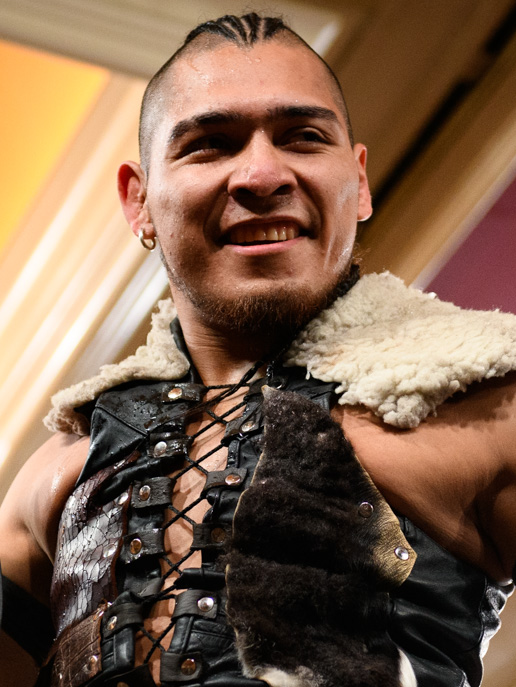
- Vikingo in January 2023

Personal information
- Born: Emmanuel Roman Morales; April 29, 1997 (age 29) Puebla, Puebla, Mexico
- Children: 2

Professional wrestling career
- Ring names: Aracno; El Hijo de King Vikingo; El Hijo del Vikingo; Hijo del Vikingo
- Billed height: 165 cm (5 ft 5 in)
- Billed weight: 70 kg (154 lb)
- Billed from: Puebla, México
- Trained by: King Vikingo
- Debut: December 12, 2012

Emmanuel Roman Morales (born April 29, 1997), better known by his ring name El Hijo del Vikingo, is a Mexican professional wrestler. He is signed to WWE, where he performs under the Lucha Libre AAA Worldwide (AAA) banner and is a member of El Ojo (Spanish for "The Eye"). He is a former two-time AAA Mega Champion, with his first reign as the AAA Mega Champion being the longest in AAA history, holding the championship for 833 days. He is also a former one-time AAA Latin American Champion. He has also made appearances for All Elite Wrestling (AEW), Ring of Honor (ROH) and Total Nonstop Action Wrestling (TNA).

== Professional wrestling career ==
=== Lucha Libre AAA Worldwide / WWE (2017–present) ===
==== Los Jinetes del Aire (2017–2021) ====
Vikingo made his debut on the independent circuit and was defeated by Pequeno Cobra with Guerrerito de Plata, Memin Pinguin, Nube Negra, Pequeno Joker, Pequeno Kraneo, Alebrije and Vega Streetfighter.

In 2017, he began working full-time for Lucha Libre AAA Worldwide (AAA), initially working in the first match of the night teaming with Concord and Octagoncito to defeat Bronco Gonzalez, Guerrero de Plata and Mini Abismo Negro. At Triplemanía XXV, El Hijo del Vikingo teamed with Angelikal and The Tigger to defeat Angel Mortal Jr., Tiger Boy and Villano III Jr. in the final of La Llave a la Gloria. That same night, he was named the winner of the tournament along with Ashley and Angelikal, but nevertheless, Director of Talent of AAA Vampiro announced that the fourteen finalists would all receive a contract with the promotion.

On November 18, 2018, Vikingo teamed with Angelikal and Laredo Kid to defeat El Nuevo Poder del Norte (Carta Brava Jr., Tito Santana and Mocho Cota Jr.), that same night the trio demanded a match for the AAA World Trios Championship. In December, at Guerra de Titanes, the trio (with Angelikal changing gimmicks to Myzteziz Jr. the same night) defeated El Nuevo Poder del Norte again to win the titles. Going into 2019, the trio would go on to be known as Los Jinetes del Aire ("The Air Raiders"). On June 9, 2019, Vikingo unsuccessfully challenged Laredo Kid for the AAA World Cruiserweight Championship. Prior to Triplemanía XXVIII, Laredo Kid vacated the AAA World Trios Championship in order to focus on his singles career following advice from La Parka and Golden Magic would replace him in the trio. At the event, the trio won the vacant AAA World Trios Championship in a three-way match which included El Nuevo Poder del Norte and Las Fresas Salvajes (Pimpinela Escarlata, Mamba, and Máximo). Later in the year, Golden Magic would change his gimmick to Octagon Jr. At Guerra de Titanes, Myzteziz Jr. and El Hijo del Vikingo unsuccessfully challenged AAA World Tag Team Champions the Lucha Brothers (Fénix and Pentagón Jr.) in a match that also included Australian Suicide and Rey Horus. On February 22, 2020, Los Jinetes del Aire successfully defended the AAA World Trios Championship against Los Mercenarios (La Hiedra, Rey Escorpión and Taurus). The trio made a second successful defence on the May 2 episode of Major League Wrestling's Fusion against Injustice (Jordan Oliver, Kotto Brazil and Myron Reed).

After an almost one-year layoff due to the COVID-19 pandemic, Vikingo returned to the ring on the February 12, 2021, episode of AAA on Space, teaming with Psycho Clown to defeat Chessman and Rey Escorpión. On the May 8 episode of AAA on Space, Los Jinetes del Aire lost the AAA World Trios Championship to Los Mercenarios (El Texano Jr., La Hiedra and Rey Escorpión). At Triplemanía XXIX and Héroes Inmortales XIV, Vikingo and Laredo Kid unsuccessfully challenged the Lucha Brothers for the AAA World Tag Team Championships.

==== AAA Mega Champion (2021–2025) ====
Vikingo was due to face Kenny Omega for the AAA Mega Championship at Triplemanía Regia II, however, Omega was forced to pull out of the title defence and vacated the title due to requiring multiple surgeries. On November 22, AAA announced a new champion would be determined in a five-way match at the event. On December 4, 2021, at Triplemanía Regia II, Vikingo defeated Samuray Del Sol, Bobby Fish, Jay Lethal and Bandido to win the vacant AAA Mega Championship. The following day, he made his first successful title defence against Laredo Kid.

Vikingo began 2022 with back-to-back AAA Mega title defences against Aramis on the January 27, 2022, episode of MLW's Azteca and Johnny Superstar at Rey de Reyes. At Triplemanía XXX: Monterrey, on April 30, Vikingo teamed with Fénix in a losing effort against The Young Bucks. The following Triplemania XXX: Tijuana show on June 18 saw Vikingo on the losing end again, failing to win the AAA World Cruiserweight and Latin American Championships in a five-way match won by Fénix. At Triplemanía XXX: Mexico City, on October 15, Vikingo successfully defended the AAA Mega Championship against Fénix in a match where the Cruiserweight and Latin American titles were not on the line. Despite a generally mixed year in terms of results, Vikingo was ranked eighth in Pro Wrestling Illustrated's 2022 PWI 500, the highest ranked Mexican wrestler since Alberto Del Rio in 2013. After suffering an injury, he vacated the title on March 17, 2024, ending his reigns with 833 days as champion.

On April 19, 2025, during WrestleMania 41 weekend, El Hijo del Vikingo's contract was acquired by WWE, who also purchased the entire promotion. On Night 1 of WrestleMania, Vikingo was ringside during Rey Fenix's match with El Grande Americano. He got physically involved with the latter after Americano cheated to win the match. On May 31, 2025, Vikingo defeated Alberto El Patrón at Alianzas to win the AAA Mega Championship for the second time. At the WWE and AAA event Worlds Collide on June 7, Vikingo successfully defended the title against Chad Gable. On August 16, 2025, at Triplemanía XXXIII, Vikingo again successfully defended his title in a fatal-four-way match against Dragon Lee, Dominik Mysterio and El Grande Americano (now portrayed by Ludwig Kaiser following Chad Gable's injury). Vikingo was subsequently challenged by Mysterio to a match for the championship at the upcoming Worlds Collide in September. Vikingo would appear on the August 18 episode of WWE Raw, aiding Dragon Lee against an attack from The Judgment Day only to be taken down by Mysterio. At the next WWE and AAA event Worlds Collide: Las Vegas on September 12, Vikingo lost the title to Mysterio after interference from Americano, ending his second reign at 104 days.

==== Championship pursuits (2025–present) ====
On October 25 at Héroes Inmortales, Vikingo turned heel by displaying a cocky attitude and berating the fans, after months of being booed by the audience prior, before he was interrupted by El Grande Americano. His heel turn was solidified on the main event of the November 22 edition of AAA Alianzas when he walked off on Dragon Lee.

On March 14, 2026, at Rey de Reyes, Vikingo failed to regain the Mega Championship from Dominik Mysterio and per the added stipulation of the match, Vikingo was no longer allowed to challenge for the title as long as Mysterio was champion. On May 30, at the AAA Noche de los Grandes event; Vikingo won the AAA Latin American Championship from El Hijo del Dr. Wagner Jr. after outside help from Omos. On the June 30 episode of NXT he was scheduled to defend the title against EK Prosper. In storyline Vikingo suffered a knee injury after an attack by Keanu Carver. On the July 3rd episode of SmackDown, Vikingo unsuccessfully challenged Rey Fenix for the AAA Cruiserweight championship. On July 11 episode of Lucha Libre AAA, the Latin American Championship was vacated due to Vikingo suffering a knee injury. It was later reported that Vikingo had suffered a torn ACL.

=== Total Nonstop Action Wrestling (2018–2025) ===
Due to AAA's alliance with American promotion Impact Wrestling, Vikingo made a special appearance on the January 12, 2019 edition of TNA Impact!, which was taped January 11–12, 2019 at Mexico City's Frontón México Entertainment Center. He was defeated by the Impact X Division Champion Rich Swann. Vikingo teamed up with Aero Star, Psycho Clown and Puma King in an Elimination Match where they defeated Eddie Edwards, Eli Drake, Fallah Bahh and Sami Callihan winning the Impact World Cup.

On October 27, 2024, after just returning to in-ring action from a knee injury, it was reported that Vikingo had suffered a leg injury during a taping of Impact!.

At Rebellion, Vikingo competed in an Ultimate X match for TNA X Division Championship which was won by Moose.

=== All Elite Wrestling / Ring of Honor (2023–2024) ===
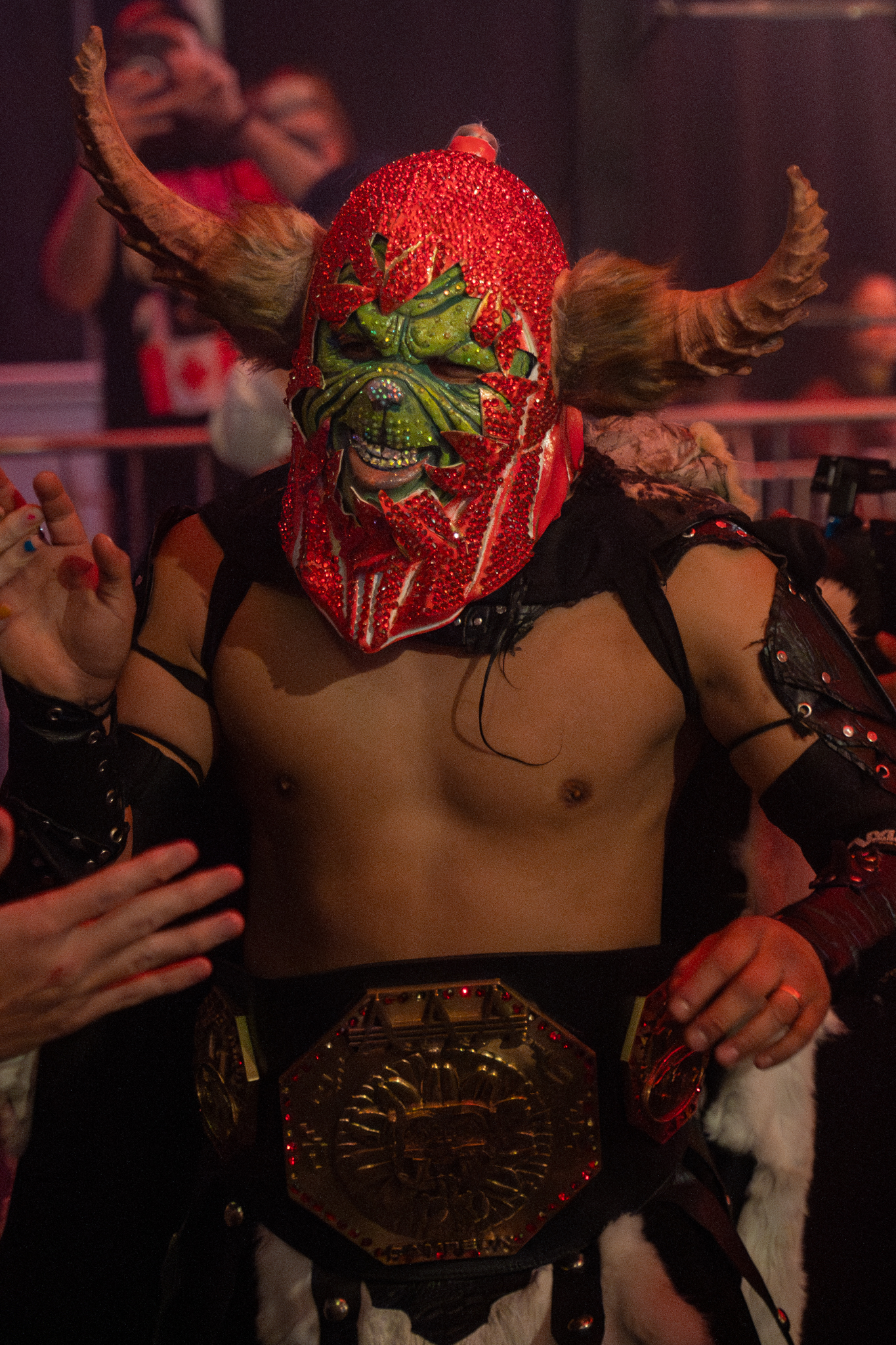
Vikingo in 2024 wearing an entrance mask

Vikingo made his debut for All Elite Wrestling (AEW) on the March 22, 2023 edition of Dynamite, where he was defeated by Kenny Omega in the main event. On March 30, Vikingo made his debut for AEW's sister promotion Ring of Honor (ROH), defeating Blake Christian. The following day at Supercard of Honor, Vikingo successfully defended his AAA Mega Championship against Komander. Despite these appearances, Vikingo was never an official member of the AEW roster. Throughout 2023 Vikingo wrestled on Collision and Rampage usually teaming with The Lucha Brothers and or Komander in trios action. At Holiday Bash he retained his AAA Mega Championship against Black Taurus. On the January 3, 2024 episode of Dynamite Vikingo competed in a Four-way match for an opportunity to face Eddie Kingston for the AEW Continental Championship which was won by Trent Beretta. On the January 24 episode of Rampage Vikingo once again competed in a Four-way match for an opportunity to face Orange Cassidy for the AEW International Championship which was won by Komander.

== Personal life ==
Morales has at least two children from previous relationships, one of whom was with luchadora Hades.

== Championships and accomplishments ==
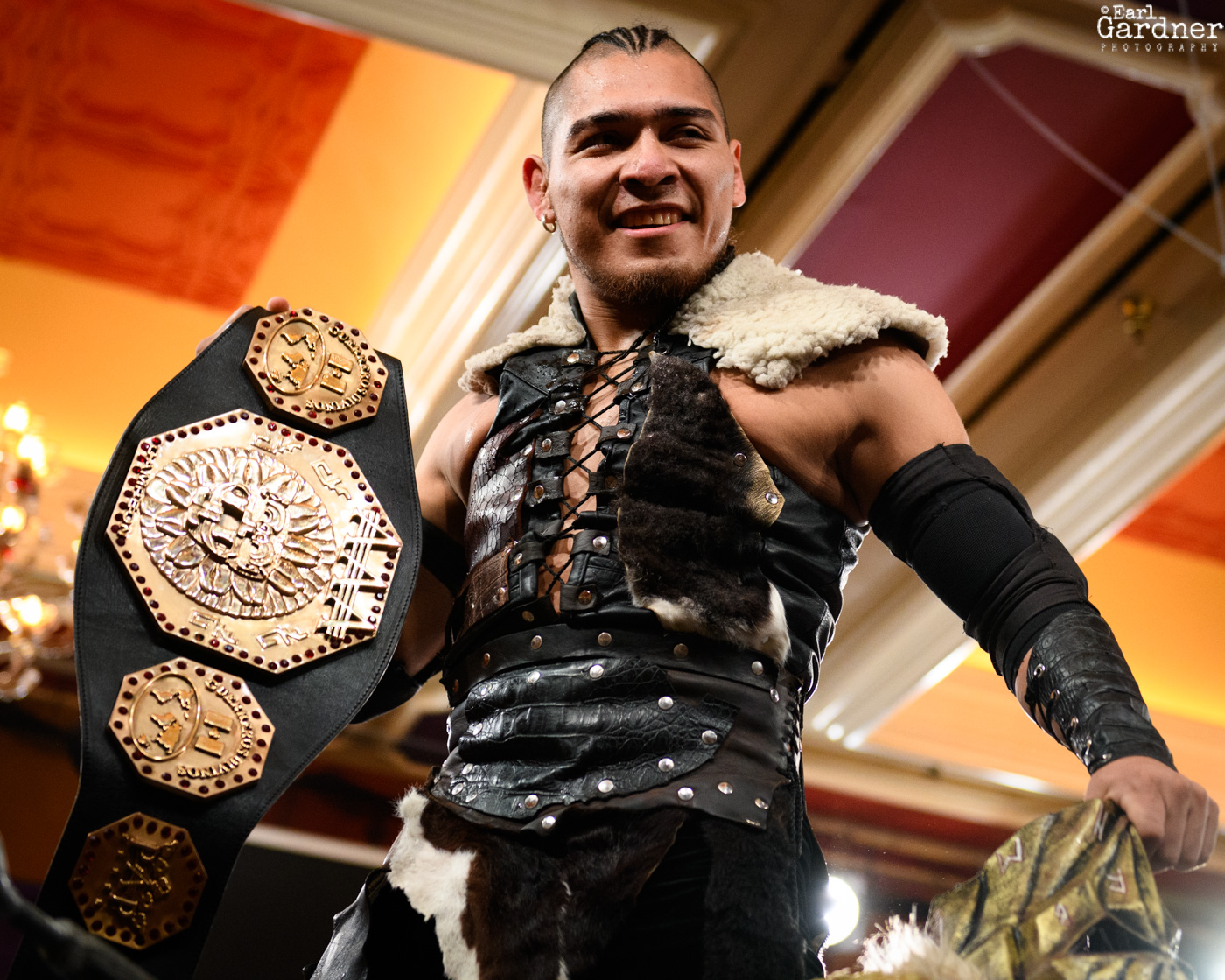
Vikingo as the AAA Mega Champion in 2023

- The Crash Lucha Libre
  - The Crash Heavyweight Championship (1 time)
- ESPN
  - Ranked No. 4 of the 30 best Pro Wrestlers Under 30 in 2023
- Impact Wrestling
  - Impact World Cup of Wrestling (2019) – with Aero Star, Puma King and Psycho Clown
- Lucha Libre AAA Worldwide
  - AAA Mega Championship (2 times)
  - AAA Latin American Championship (1 time)
  - AAA World Trios Championship (2 times) – with Laredo Kid and Myzteziz Jr. (1) and Golden Magic and Myzteziz Jr. (1)
  - Marvel Lucha Libre Championship (1 time, inaugural and final)
  - Llave a la Gloria tournament (2017) – with Ashley and Angelikal
  - Copa Antonio Peña (2019)
  - Lucha Capital (2019 Men's)
  - Copa Hijo del Perro Aguayo (2021)
  - Rey de Reyes (2024)
- Pro Wrestling Illustrated
  - Ranked No. 5 of the top 500 singles wrestlers in the PWI 500 in 2023
- Sports Illustrated
  - Ranked No. 7 of the top 10 wrestlers in 2022
- Warrior Wrestling
  - Warrior Wrestling Lucha Championship (1 time)
- Wrestling Observer Newsletter
  - Mexico MVP (2021, 2022)
  - Non-Heavyweight MVP (2022, 2023)
  - Best Flying Wrestler (2022, 2023)
