= Ángel Mortal Jr. =

Mexican professional wrestler

Angel Mortal Jr.
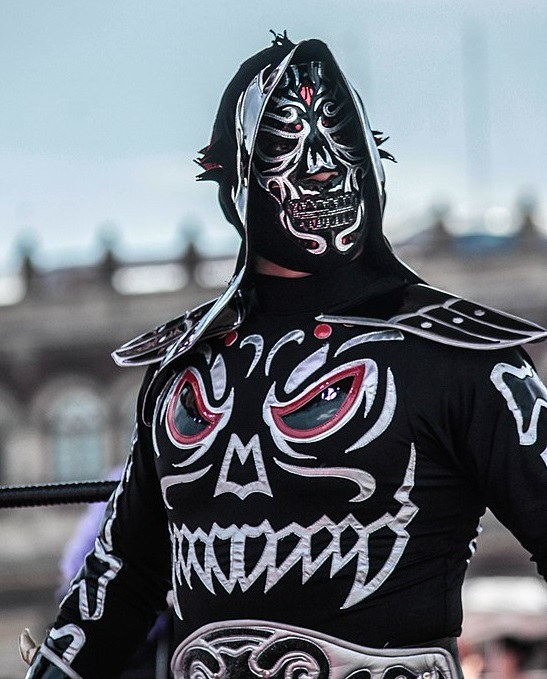
- Mortal working as La Parka Negra in July 2018

Personal information
- Born: May 19, 1992 (age 34) Mexico

Professional wrestling career
- Ring name(s): La Parka Negra (IV); Angel Mortal Jr.
- Billed height: 1.85 m (6 ft 1 in)
- Trained by: Angel Mortal
- Debut: 2012

Angel Mortal Jr. (Spanish: 'Deadly Angel'; born May 19, 1992) is a Mexican professional wrestler. He is working current for Lucha Libre AAA Worldwide (AAA) and WWE under the ring name La Parka Negra (Spanish for 'The Black Reaper').

He made his debut for the promotion under the name Angel Mortal Jr. as one of the prospects of AAA's 2017 La Llave a la Gloria tournament. He worked current in AAA under that name until late 2017, when he took over the masked gimmick of La Parka Negra, since the previous La Parka Negra was no longer under contract with AAA. On April 30, 2022, at Triplemanía XXX: Monterrey, Negra participated in a four-way match for the AAA World Mixed Tag Team Championship, subbing in for an injured Sammy Guevara. Despite this, Guevara was involved in the finish, which saw him and his partner Tay Conti win the championship.
