= Los Mercenarios =

Professional wrestling stable

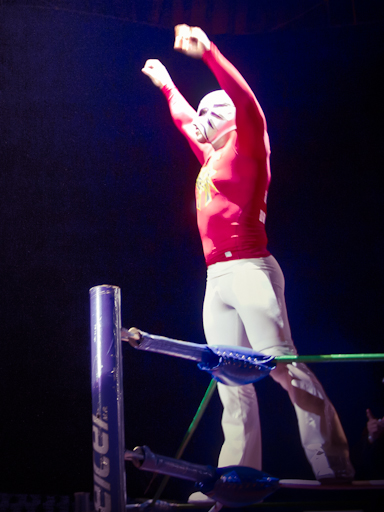
- La Máscara, founder of Los Mercenarios and former leader

Stable
- Name(s): Los Ingober AAA; Los Mercenarios
- Members: Rey Escorpión; La Hiedra; Taurus; Villano III Jr.
- Billed from: México
- Former members: El Hijo del Fantasma; La Máscara; Texano Jr.
- Debut: August 18, 2018
- Disbanded: 2022
- Years active: 2018–2022

Los Mercenarios (Spanish for "The Mercenaries") was a villainous professional wrestling stable performing in Lucha Libre AAA Worldwide (AAA), consisting of Rey Escorpión, Taurus, Villano III Jr., and La Hiedra. It originally also included La Máscara and El Hijo del Fantasma who have since left AAA. Los Mercenarios founder La Máscara stated out that it would be a stable similar to CMLL's Los Ingobernables, a group he was a member of for years prior to working for AAA.

== History ==
With the passage of time, La Máscara was willing to have his own Ingobernables in AAA, in which it was succeeded on August 10, 2018 when La Mascara betraying Máximo thus dissolving the group of Los Mosqueteros del Diablo after their defeats during all their functions. On August 25, Los Mercenarios defeated Joe Líder, Murder Clown, and Pagano at Triplemanía XXVI. On September 9 in Cancun, The Mercenaries (La Máscara and Rey Escorpión) teamed with Australian Suicide and El Hijo de L.A. Park only to lose to Aerostar and Máximo. On September 30, Los Mercenarios (El Texano Jr., La Máscara and Rey Escorpión) were defeated by Mamba, Máximo and Pimpinela Escarlata.

On October 28, in Héroes Inmortales XII, Texano and Escorpión defended their AAA World Tag Team Championship against Andrew Everett and DJZ and Mexablood (Bandido and Flamita). On the same night, Fantasma fell defeated by Pagano for the Copa Antonio Peña. On December 2 in Guerra de Titanes, Texano and Escorpión returned to defend their titles against Joe Líder and Pagano and Los Macizos (Ciclope and Miedo Extremo) in an extreme rules match.

On March 16, 2019 in Rey de Reyes, La Máscara, Killer Kross and Jeff Jarrett lost to . Las Fresas Salvajes (Mamba and Máximo) and Psycho Clown That same night, Texano and Escorpión lost their championship to the Lucha Brothers (Fénix & Pentagón Jr.) ending their reign of 356 days. On March 20, 2019, El Hijo del Fantasma officially announced that he would leave Los Mercenarios for his departure from the AAA.

== Championships and accomplishments ==
- DDT Pro-Wrestling
  - Ironman Heavymetalweight Championship (2 times) – La Hiedra (1) and Texano Jr. (1)
- Kaoz Lucha Libre
  - Kaoz Heavyweight Championship (1 time, current) – Rey Escorpión
- Lucha Libre AAA Worldwide
  - AAA Latin American Championship (1 time) – El Hijo del Fantasma
  - AAA World Tag Team Championship (1 time) – Rey Escorpión and Texano Jr.
  - AAA World Trios Championship (1 time) – Rey Escorpión, Taurus and La Hiedra
- Promociones EMW
  - EMW World Women's Championship (1 time, current) – La Hiedra

== See also ==
- Los Ingobernables
- Los Ingobernables de Japón
