= Sam Adonis =

American professional wrestler (born 1989)

Personal information
- Born: Samuel Elias Polinsky; August 9, 1989 (age 37) Monroeville, Pennsylvania, U.S.
- Family: Dan Polinsky (father); Corey Graves (brother)
- Website: Sam Adonis on X

Professional wrestling career
- Ring name(s): Bill Callous; Buddy Stretcher; Sam Adonis; Sam Elias; Samuel Elias; El Rudo
- Billed height: 6 ft 4 in (1.93 m)
- Billed weight: 251 lb (114 kg)
- Trained by: Corey Graves
- Debut: 2008

Samuel Elias Polinsky (born August 9, 1989) is an American professional wrestler and promoter, He currently performs on the independent circuit and for Lucha Libre AAA Worldwide (AAA) under the ring name Sam Adonis. Adonis formerly worked in Mexico's Consejo Mundial de Lucha Libre (CMLL) as a heel pro-Trump character. He has also competed in the National Wrestling Alliance (NWA).

Polinsky has briefly worked for WWE, in their Florida Championship Wrestling (FCW) developmental league, under the name Buddy Stretcher and worked a match for Total Nonstop Action Wrestling (TNA) under the name Bill Callous, but has spent the majority of his pro wrestling career in England working for various promotions such as All Star Wrestling (ASW).

== Professional wrestling career ==
=== Early career (2008–2011) ===
Polinsky made his professional wrestling debut in early 2008, working primarily on the independent circuit in his native Pennsylvania. He would often team with his brother Matthew, better known under the ring name Sterling James Keenan while Sam Polinsky was known as "Samuel Elias" or simply "Sam Elias". The brothers competed in a 2008 tournament for the local Pittsburgh Tag Team Championship, but lost in the final to the team of Ashton Amherst and Patrick Hayes. In 2009 Elias began teaming with Amherst, following a tag team known as "Vicious and Delicious", who won the Diamond Championship Wrestling (DCW) Tag Team Championship from the PA Posse (Kato and Sebastian). Their reign lasted for 70 days, until they lost the title to "Team Tap Out" on March 6, 2010.

In the fall of 2010, he began working for Far North Wrestling (FNW), based out of Pittsburgh. During his time with FNW he won the Ches-A-Rena Championship on three separate occasions, defeating T. Rantula, Michael Blade and Jimmy Vegas respectively to win the championship. The promotion closed in 2011, leaving Sam Elias as the last recognized Ches-A-Rena Champion.

=== WWE ===
==== Florida Championship Wrestling (2011) ====
In April 2011 Polinsky, using the ring name "Buddy Stretcher", began working for WWE's developmental league, Florida Championship Wrestling (FCW). Polinsky suffered a knee injury after only two matches with FCW and was later released.

=== Europe (2011–2016) ===
While Polinsky was not successful in FCW he did strike up a friendship with WWE wrestler William Regal who used his contacts to get Polinsky work in the United Kingdom for All Star Wrestling. Polinsky began working under the name "Sam Adonis", a vain, self-obsessed, narcissistic heel. While living in England for several years he also worked for other European wrestling promotions such as the European Wrestling Promotion in Germany, and New Wrestling Entertainment in Italy. In 2014 he participated in ASW's "King of the Ring" tournament, defeating Mexx in the first round, but losing to Dean Allmark in the second round.

In November 2015, Adonis won the British Heavyweight Championship, sometimes referred to as the "SuperSlam" championship, becoming the first American to win the championship. In April 2016 he returned to the United States and at some point later was officially stripped of the championship for lack of defenses. On April 27, 2017 Polinsky worked on an episode of Total Nonstop Action Wrestling's television show under the name "Bill Callous", losing to Ethan Carter III.

=== Mexico (2016–Present) ===
On May 1, 2016, Adonis worked his first match in Mexico, defending the British Heavyweight Championship against Mexican wrestler Black Fire, on a Desastre Total Ultraviolento (DTU) show. A few weeks later he began working for Consejo Mundial de Lucha Libre (CMLL), Mexico's largest and the world's oldest wrestling promotion. His first major appearance was for the 2016 version of the International Grand Prix, a 16-man tournament featuring native Mexican wrestlers facing foreigners. Adonis was the fourth wrestler eliminated, pinned by Rush. From that point on Adonis began working for CMLL on a regular basis, although he was not signed to a long-term contract with the company.

In the fall of 2016, Polinsky approached the CMLL promoters with a suggestion to tweak his "pretty boy" character, playing off the political situation of the time. With CMLL's approval Sam Adonis became a staunch Donald Trump supporter, including waving a four-foot-long US flag emblazoned with Trump's face as he played off the then-President Elect's stance on Mexico and immigrants. He later had a pair of wrestling trunks airbrushed to feature the face of Donald Trump on the back, in a homage to wrestler Rick Rude, to further the "Pro Trump" image. The character was so successful that one magazine said that Adonis "might be the most hated man in Mexico". When Okumura returned to CMLL, Adonis quickly added the fellow foreigner as part of the team. During a match, teammates Johnny Idol and Valiente had problems with each other and Idol turned heel after that match and Idol became part of Okumura and Adonis's team, in mid 2018 he parted ways with CMLL.

In 2017 he began working for Ultimo Dragon's Toryumon Mexico, and their AJPW/Toryumon Mexico Lucha Fiesta Ultimo Dragon Anniversary shows.

=== Japan (2017–present) ===
On August 19, 2017, Adonis appeared in All Japan Pro Wrestling/Toryumon Mexico, teaming with Joe Doering and Diamante against Ultimo Dragon, Jun Akiyama and Caristico for Ultimo's 30th anniversary in Japan; they were defeated in a two-out-of-three falls bout. During the match Adonis ripped Ultimo's mask. He is the only pro wrestler to remove Ultimo Dragon's mask in both Japan and Mexico.

=== Major League Wrestling (2022–present) ===
Adonis made his Major League Wrestling debut against Jacob Fatu.

== Personal life ==
Polinsky was born in 1989 and is of Hungarian descent. He is the son of professional wrestling promoter Dan Polinsky who helped organize shows in his native Pittsburgh. His older brother is retired professional wrestler-turned-color commentator Matthew Polinsky, better known under the ring name Corey Graves and formerly known as Sterling James Keenan. Sam was trained by his older brother for his professional wrestling career. In subsequent years, Sam Polinsky has stated that he never wanted to exploit the fact that his brother was a well known "name" in professional wrestling, preferring to make it on his own merit.

When US news outlets picked up on the story of Polinsky playing a "pro Trump" character in Mexico Polinsky was quoted as stating:

I can't say I support Trump but I definitely respect Trump. He is just himself, and if you like it, you like it, and if you don't, you don't. — Sam Polinsky,

He also made a point that the "Sam Adonis" character did not reflect his personal beliefs, especially his feelings for Mexico and Mexicans in general, pointing out that he had a Mexican girlfriend.

== Championships and accomplishments ==
- All Star Wrestling

- ASW British Heavyweight Championship/SuperSlam Champion (1 time)

- Devotion Championship Wrestling
  - DCW Heavyweight Championship (1 time)
- Diamond Championship Wrestling

- DCW Tag Team Championship (1 time) – with Ashton Amherst

- Far North Wrestling

- Ches-A-Rena Championship (3 times)

- GALLI Lucha Libre
  - GALLI Indiscutible Championship (1 time)
- International Wrestling Cartel
  - ICW Super Indy Championship (1 time)
- New Tradition Lucha Libre
  - NTLL Heavyweight Championship (1 time)
- Texoma Pro Wrestling
  - Unified Texoma Pro World Heavyweight Championship (1 time)
- Lucha Libre AAA Worldwide
  - AAA World Trios Championship (1 time) – with Puma King and DMT Azul
  - Rey de Reyes (2023)
- Palē Pro Wrestling
  - Palē Pro Heavyweight Championship(1 time, inaugural)
  - Palē Pro Heavyweight Title Tournament (2021)
- Pro Wrestling Illustrated
  - Ranked No. 70 of the top 500 singles wrestlers in the PWI 500 in 2023
- Warrior Wrestling
  - Warrior Wrestling Lucha Championship (1 time)
- World Association of Wrestling

- WAW Undisputed Heavyweight Championship (1 time)

== Luchas de Apuestas record ==
Winner (wager)	Loser (wager)	Location	Event	Date	Notes
Sam Adonis (hair)	Blue Panther (hair)	Mexico City	CMLL Super Viernes	August 4, 2017	
Negro Casas (hair)	Sam Adonis (hair)	Mexico City	Sin Piedad	January 1, 2018	
Psycho Clown (mask)	Sam Adonis (hair)	Mexico City	Triplemanía XXXI	August 12, 2023	(Note: Match also included Rush El Toro Blanco (hair) and L.A. Park (mask))
