= The Beast Mortos =

Mexican professional wrestler (born 1987)

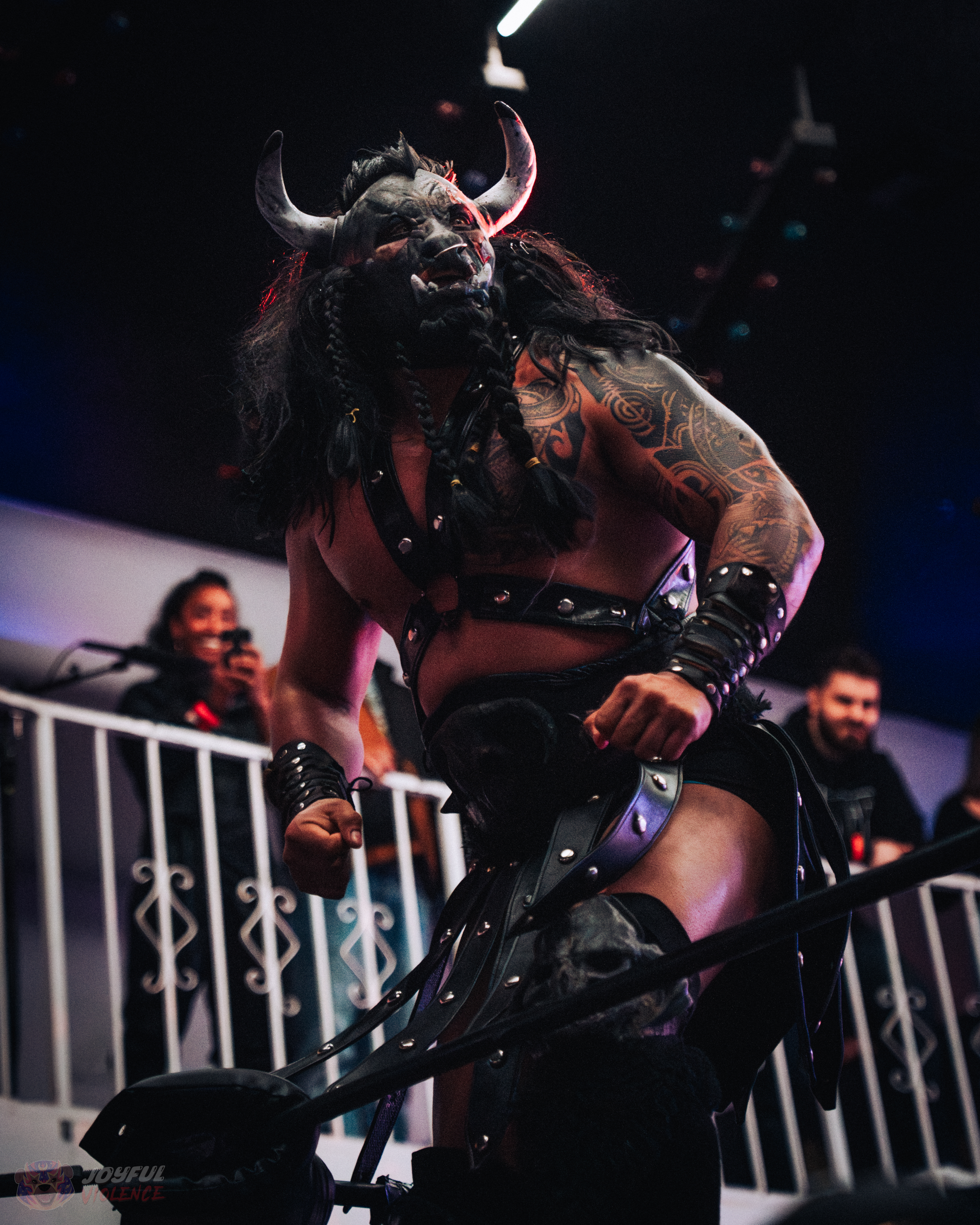
- Mortos as Black Taurus in February 2024

Personal information
- Born: March 11, 1987 (age 39) Torreón, Coahuila, Mexico
- Children: 1

Professional wrestling career
- Ring name(s): Black Beast; Black Tauro; Black Taurus; Machine Rocker; Semental; Taurus; The Beast Mortos; Venenoide
- Billed height: 1.78 m (5 ft 10 in)
- Billed weight: 113 kg (249 lb)
- Trained by: Diabolico; Tony Rodriguez; Araña del Futuro; El Satánico
- Debut: November 6, 2005

The Beast Mortos (born March 11, 1987), formerly known as Black Taurus, is a Mexican professional wrestler. He is signed to All Elite Wrestling (AEW), where he is a member of La Facción Ingobernable. He also appears in their sister company Ring of Honor (ROH), where he is former one-time ROH World Tag Team Champion with Sammy Guevara.

He is also known for his work for Lucha Libre AAA Worldwide (AAA), International Wrestling Revolution Group, Lucha Libre Elite, The Crash Lucha Libre, Impact Wrestling, Major League Wrestling (MLW), Pro Wrestling Guerrilla (PWG) as well as on the Mexican and independent circuit.

His real name is unknown, as is often the case with masked wrestlers in Mexico, where their private lives are kept a secret from the wrestling fans.

== Professional wrestling career ==
=== Consejo Mundial de Lucha Libre (2008–2011) ===
After wrestling for years in the Torreón area under the name Semental, he would move to Mexico City in 2008. After a short stint with International Wrestling Revolution Group, he would start working in Consejo Mundial de Lucha Libre in March 2008. He wrestled regularly for CMLL for over three years, generally working opening matches that rarely made TV. He had his last match for the promotion on June 28, 2011, and then showed up in AAA two days later.

=== Lucha Libre AAA Worldwide (2012–2016) ===
He made his AAA debut June 30 in Tizayuca, still under the name Semental. He would have two more TV matches for the promotion in 2011.

In mid-2012 AAA introduced a new masked trio known as Los Inferno Rockers (Machine Rocker, Devil Rocker and Soul Rocker), a trio of masked, glam-rocker inspired wrestlers who resembled the rock band Kiss. It was later verified that the former Tito Santana was under the Soul Rocker mask. The trio was set up as the rivals of Los Psycho Circus (Psycho Clown, Murder Clown and Monster Clown), who at the time had been undefeated for years. They later introduced the 201 cm (6 ft 7 in) tall Uro Rocker to the team, targeting Psycho Clown specifically. It was later revealed that Uro Rocker was supposed to be the main rival of Psycho Clown, but the wrestler playing the part hurt wrestlers he worked with and was quickly dropped from the group.

The group lost to Los Psycho Circus at the 2012 Guerra de Titanes show, their first appearance at a major AAA show. 18 days later the trio wrestled International Wrestling Revolution Group's Los Oficiales (Oficial 911, Oficial AK-47 and Oficial Fierro) in one of the featured matches on the Arena Naucalpan 35th Anniversary Show when the match ended in a double pinfall. In early 2013 Los Inferno Rockers finally defeated Los Psycho Circus, gaining some momentum in their ongoing feud. They repeated the feat at the 2012 Rey de Reyes show, seemingly escalating their feud towards a Lucha de Apuestas, or "bet match" where the teams would put their masks on the line. The Apuestas match never happened and Los Inferno Rockers were soon diverted from Los Psycho Circus. In later 2013 Devil Rocker left AAA and was replaced by Demon Rocker to remain a trio. a member of the Los Inferno Rockers stable. The team was phased out throughout 2014, with Demon Rocker taking over the "La Parka Negra" character. By early 2015 Machine Rocker no longer appeared on AAA shows either. On October 4, 2015, Machine Rocker was repackaged and introduced as "Taurus", signaling the end of Los Inferno Rockers as a unit won a Royal Rumble Lumberjack match to win the Copa Antonio Peña.

On September 10, 2016, Taurus announced his departure from AAA.

=== Independent circuit (2016–2019) ===
Taurus debut as Black Tauro with Lucha Libre Elite teaming with Cibernetico and Sharlie Rockstar was defeated by Decnis, Mr. Aguila and Zumbido. On November 10, Tauro teaming with Rey Escorpión defeat L.A. Park and Mr. Aguila. On March 2, 2019, he made his debut for Major League Wrestling (MLW) on MLW Fusion, teaming with Laredo Kid in a losing effort against the Lucha Brothers (Pentagón Jr. and Fénix). Later, on July 26, 2019, he debuted for Pro Wrestling Guerrilla (PWG) at SIXTEEN, teaming with Laredo Kid and Puma King in a loss to Mexablood (Bandido and Flamita) and Rey Horus.

=== Return to AAA (2018–2024) ===
On March 31, 2018, Taurus returned to AAA, assisting Faby Apache in retaining the AAA Reina de Reinas Championship against Ashley. He became a regular presence in the promotion, receiving a major title opportunity on August 10, 2019, when he challenged Fénix for the AAA Mega Championship in a multi-man match also involving Laredo Kid and Puma King, though he was unsuccessful.

On January 11, 2024, Taurus announced his departure from AAA for the second time and declared himself a free agent.

=== Impact Wrestling (2019–2023) ===
Due to AAA's partnership with the American promotion Impact Wrestling, Taurus made a special appearance on the February 1, 2019 episode of Impact Wrestling, teaming with the Lucha Brothers to defeat LAX (Ortiz and Santana) and Daga in Mexico City.

Taurus returned to Impact Wrestling more regularly starting February, 2021, when he was introduced as the newest member of the Decay stable alongside Rosemary and Crazzy Steve. The trio defeated Tenille Dashwood and XXXL (Acey Romero and Larry D) at No Surrender. Taurus and Steve continued teaming, picking up a win over Reno Scum at Sacrifice on March 13. However, they failed to capture the TNA World Tag Team Championship from Violent By Design (Deaner and Rhino) at Against All Odds. Taurus also competed in singles action, including a title shot against Josh Alexander for the X Division Championship at Homecoming on July 31, 2021, which he lost.

In 2023, tensions within Decay culminated on the August 31 episode of Impact!, when Crazzy Steve betrayed Taurus. The two faced off at Victory Road, where Steve defeated him.

=== All Elite Wrestling / Ring of Honor (2023–present) ===
On December 15, 2023, Taurus made his Ring of Honor (ROH) debut at Final Battle, unsuccessfully challenging El Hijo del Vikingo for the AAA Mega Championship. He followed that up with his debut in ROH's sister promotion All Elite Wrestling (AEW) on the December 22 episode of AEW Rampage, once again unsuccessfully challenging Vikingo for the same title.

In January 2024, Taurus signed with AEW but was unable to continue using the "Black Taurus" name due to AAA owning the character rights. Rebranding as The Beast Mortos, he debuted under his new persona at ROH Supercard of Honor on April 5, where he defeated Blake Christian. He made his AEW in-ring debut on the April 27 episode of Collision in a losing effort against Rey Fénix. In September, Mortos aligned with Dralístico and Rush to join the reformed La Facción Ingobernable after attacking Hologram at the Grand Slam edition of Collision. This led to a 2-out-of-3 falls match against Hologram at WrestleDream, which Mortos lost. He later competed in the 2024 Continental Classic, but failed to win any matches.

On July 12, 2025, at All In, Mortos competed in the men's Casino Gauntlet match. which was won by MJF. On December 5 at Final Battle, Mortos teamed with stablemate Sammy Guevara to defeat Adam Priest and Tommy Billington to win the vacant ROH World Tag Team Championship. This marked Mortos' first championship in AEW/ROH. On June 26, 2026 at partner promotion CMLL's Viernes Espectaular event, Mortos and Guevara lost their titles to Místico and Máscara Dorada, ending their reign at 203 days.

=== Return to CMLL (2025–present) ===
On the July 4, 2025 edition of Viernes Espectacular, Mortos made his return to CMLL after fourteen years, teaming with Averno and Último Guerrero to defeat Esfinge, Máscara Dorada, and Templario. On the June 26, 2026 episode of Viernes Espectaular, Mortos and Sammy Guevara lost their ROH World Tag Team Championship to Místico and Máscara Dorada.

== Personal life ==
Outside of wrestling, Mortos completed law school in June 2025 and is on track to become a licensed lawyer. He is a former nurse and veterinarian.

He has one son from a previous relationship.

== Championships and accomplishments ==
- Lucha Libre AAA Worldwide
  - AAA Latin American Championship (1 time)
  - AAA World Trios Championship (1 time) – with La Hiedra, Texano Jr. and Rey Escorpión
  - Copa Antonio Peña (2015)
  - Gladiators Heavyweight Tournament (2019)
  - Lucha Libre World Cup: 2023 Men's division – with Pentagón Jr. and Laredo Kid
- Kaoz Lucha Libre
  - Kaoz Heavyweight Championship (1 time)
- Lucha Libre VOZ
  - VOZ Ultra Championship (1 time)
- Perros del Mal Producciones
  - Perros del Mal Heavyweight Championship (1 time)
  - Perros del Mal Light Heavyweight Championship (1 time)
- Pro Wrestling Illustrated
  - Ranked No. 99 of the top 500 singles wrestlers in the PWI 500 in 2021
- Ring of Honor
  - ROH World Tag Team Championship (1 time) – with Sammy Guevara
- Wrestling Observer Newsletter
  - Most Underrated (2025)
