= 2019 in professional wrestling =

2019 in professional wrestling describes the year's events in the world of professional wrestling.

== List of notable promotions ==
These promotions held notable events in 2019.

Promotion Name	Abbreviation	Notes
All Elite Wrestling	AEW	Officially founded on January 1.
Consejo Mundial de Lucha Libre	CMLL	
DDT Pro-Wrestling	DDT	The "DDT Pro-Wrestling" name has been solely used since 2004, but the "DDT" initialism had previously stood for "Dramatic Dream Team".
Evolve	—	
Impact Wrestling	Impact	
International Wrestling Revolution Group	IWRG	
Lucha Libre AAA Worldwide	AAA	The "AAA" abbreviation has been used since the mid-1990s and had previously stood for the promotion's original name Asistencia Asesoría y Administración.
Major League Wrestling	MLW	
National Wrestling Alliance	NWA	
New Japan Pro-Wrestling	NJPW	
Pro Wrestling Guerrilla	PWG	
Revolution Pro Wrestling	RevPro	
Ring of Honor	ROH	
The Crash Lucha Libre	The Crash	
Westside Xtreme Wrestling	wXw	
World Wonder Ring Stardom	Stardom	
World Wrestling Council	WWC	
WWE	—	WWE stands for World Wrestling Entertainment, which is still the legal name, but the company ceased using the full name in April 2011, with the WWE abbreviation becoming an orphaned initialism. WWE divided its roster into five storyline divisions – referred to as brands where wrestlers exclusively performed on their respective weekly television programs. Raw and SmackDown were their two main brands until NXT became their third main brand in September; NXT used to serve as WWE's developmental territory. NXT UK and 205 Live were specialty brands that were promoted under the NXT banner; 205 Live was its own brand until September when it merged under NXT.

== Calendar of notable shows ==
=== January ===
Date	Promotion(s)	Event	Location	Main Event	Notes
1	CMLL	Sin Piedad	Mexico City, Mexico	Caristico defeated Ultimo Guerrero	
4	NJPW	Wrestle Kingdom 13	Tokyo, Japan	Hiroshi Tanahashi defeated Kenny Omega (c) in a Singles match to win the IWGP Heavyweight Championship	
5	NWA	New Years Clash	Clarksville, Tennessee	Nick Aldis (c) defeated James Storm in a Singles match to retain the NWA Worlds Heavyweight Championship	
6	Impact	Homecoming	Nashville, Tennessee	Johnny Impact (c) defeated Brian Cage in a Singles match to retain the Impact World Championship	
6	CMLL	Reyes Del Aire	Mexico City, Mexico	Caristico, Dragon Lee and Volador Jr. defeated La Sangre Dinamita (Forastero and Sansón) and Ultimo Guerrero by DQ	
11	RevPro	New Year's Resolution	Guildford, Surrey, England, UK	Zack Sabre Jr (c) defeated Shigehiro Irie in a Singles match to retain the Undisputed British Heavyweight Championship	
12	WWE: NXT UK	TakeOver: Blackpool	Blackpool, Lancashire, England	Pete Dunne (c) defeated Joe Coffey in a Singles match to retain the WWE United Kingdom Championship	First NXT UK TakeOver event, and the first event to feature the NXT UK Tag Team Championship.
13	ROH	Honor Reigns Supreme	Concord, North Carolina	Jay Lethal (c) defeated Dalton Castle in a Singles match to retain the ROH World Championship	
18	CMLL; NJPW	Fantastica Mania (Tokyo shows)	Tokyo, Japan	Dragon Lee and Místico defeated Nueva Generacion Dinamitas (Cuatrero and Sansón) in a CMLL Family Tag Tournament Final Match	
20	CMLL; NJPW	Fantastica Mania (Tokyo shows)	Tokyo, Japan	Dragon Lee and Místico defeated Los Guerreros Laguneros (Gran Guerrero and Último Guerrero)	
21	CMLL; NJPW	Fantastica Mania (Tokyo shows)	Tokyo, Japan	Volador Jr. defeated Carístico	
24	ROH	Road to G1 Supercard Texas	Dallas, Texas	Jay Lethal and Jonathan Gresham defeated Mark Haskins and Tracy Williams	
25	ROH	Road to G1 Supercard Texas	Houston, Texas	Lifeblood (Bandido, Juice Robinson, David Finlay, Mark Haskins and Tracy Williams) defeated Bully Ray, Shane Taylor, Silas Young and The Briscoes (Jay Briscoe and Mark Briscoe)	
26	ROH	Road to G1 Supercard Texas	San Antonio, Texas	Villain Enterprises (Brody King and PCO) defeated Lifeblood (David Finlay and Juice Robinson) to win 2019 Tag Wars	
26–27	WWE: NXT; NXT UK; 205 Live	Worlds Collide	Phoenix, Arizona	Velveteen Dream defeated Tyler Bate in a tournament final match to earn a championship match of his choice from either NXT, NXT UK, or 205 Live	Aired on tape delay on February 2. Dream chose to challenge for the NXT North American Championship.
26	WWE: NXT	TakeOver: Phoenix	Phoenix, Arizona	Tommaso Ciampa (c) defeated Aleister Black in a Singles match to retain the NXT Championship	
27	WWE: Raw; SmackDown; 205 Live	Royal Rumble	Phoenix, Arizona	Seth Rollins won the 30-man Royal Rumble match by last eliminating Braun Strowman to earn a world championship match at WrestleMania 35	Becky Lynch won the women's Royal Rumble match and chose to challenge Ronda Rousey for the Raw Women's Championship at WrestleMania 35. Seth Rollins chose to challenge Brock Lesnar for the Universal Championship at WrestleMania 35.
(c) – denotes defending champion(s)

=== February ===
Date	Promotion(s)	Event	Location	Main Event	Notes
2	MLW	SuperFight	Philadelphia, Pennsylvania	Tom Lawlor defeated Low Ki (c) to win the MLW World Heavyweight Championship	
2	NJPW	The New Beginning in Sapporo	Sapporo, Japan	Bullet Club (Bad Luck Fale and Jay White) defeated Kazuchika Okada and Hiroshi Tanahashi	
3	NJPW	The New Beginning in Sapporo	Sapporo, Japan	Tetsuya Naito (c) defeated Taichi to retain the IWGP Intercontinental Championship	
3	WWE: NXT	Halftime Heat	Orlando, Florida	Aleister Black, Ricochet and Velveteen Dream defeated Johnny Gargano, Tommaso Ciampa and Adam Cole	
10	ROH	Bound By Honor	Miami, Florida	The Kingdom (Matt Taven, T. K. O'Ryan and Vinny Marseglia) defeated Jonathan Gresham, Jay Lethal, and Rush	
11	NJPW	The New Beginning in Osaka	Osaka, Japan	Jay White defeated Hiroshi Tanahashi (c) to win the IWGP Heavyweight Championship	
15	CMLL	Universal Championship	Mexico City, Mexico	El Terrible defeated Niebla Roja in the finals to win the CMLL Universal Championship	
15	RevPro	High Stakes	London, England	PAC vs. Will Ospreay ended in a time-limit draw	
17	DDT	Judgement 2019: DDT 22nd Anniversary	Tokyo, Japan	Konosuke Takeshita defeated Daisuke Sasaki (c) for the KO-D Openweight Championship	
17	WWE: Raw; SmackDown; 205 Live	Elimination Chamber	Houston, Texas	Daniel Bryan (c) defeated Kofi Kingston, Randy Orton, AJ Styles, Jeff Hardy, and Samoa Joe in the Elimination Chamber match to retain the WWE Championship	First event to feature the WWE Women's Tag Team Championship, a new title for WWE's women's division.
22	ROH; NJPW	Honor Rising: Japan	Tokyo, Japan	Hiroshi Tanahashi, Kazuchika Okada and Jay Lethal defeated The Kingdom (Matt Taven, T. K. O'Ryan and Vinny Marseglia)	
23	ROH; NJPW	Honor Rising: Japan	Tokyo, Japan	The Briscoe Brothers (Jay Briscoe and Mark Briscoe) (c) defeated Lifeblood (Juice Robinson and David Finlay) to retain the ROH World Tag Team Championship	
(c) – denotes defending champion(s)

=== March ===
Date	Promotion(s)	Event	Location	Main Event	Notes
2	MLW	Intimidation Games	Chicago, Illinois	Tom Lawlor (c) defeated Low Ki in a Steel Cage Match for MLW World Heavyweight Championship	
6	NJPW	NJPW 47th Anniversary Show	Tokyo, Japan	Jay White defeated Will Ospreay	Champion vs. Champion Match
10	WWE: Raw; SmackDown	Fastlane	Cleveland, Ohio	The Shield (Dean Ambrose, Seth Rollins, and Roman Reigns) defeated Baron Corbin, Bobby Lashley, and Drew McIntyre in a Six-man tag team match	Final Fastlane event until 2021.
15	ROH	ROH 17th Anniversary Show	Sunrise Manor, Nevada	Villain Enterprises (Brody King and PCO) defeated The Briscoes (Jay Briscoe and Mark Briscoe) (c) to win the ROH World Tag Team Championship	
15	CMLL	Homenaje a Dos Leyendas	Mexico City, Mexico	Los Hermano Chavez (Ángel de Oro and Niebla Roja) defeated Los Ingobernables (El Terrible and La Bestia del Ring) in the Best two-out-of-three falls Lucha de Apuestas, hair vs. hair match	
16	AAA	Rey de Reyes	Puebla, Puebla	The Young Bucks (Matt Jackson and Nick Jackson) defeated Lucha Brothers (Fénix and Pentagón Jr.) (c) for the AAA World Tag Team Championship	
21	DDT	Into The Fight 2019	Tokyo, Japan	Harashima (c) defeated Muscle Sakai to retain the DDT Extreme Championship	
31	ROH	Road to G1 Supercard Baltimore	Baltimore, Maryland	Jay Lethal and Jeff Cobb defeated The Kingdom (T. K. O'Ryan and Vinny Marseglia) and Lifeblood (Juice Robinson and Bandido)	
(c) – denotes defending champion(s)

=== April ===
Date	Promotion(s)	Event	Location	Main Event	Notes
4	wXw	Amerika 1st Wunderbar	Queens, New York	Bobby Gunns (c) defeated Shigehiro Irie to retain the wXw Unified World Wrestling Championship	
4	DDT	Coming to America	Queens, New York	Tetsuya Endo defeated Daisuke Sasaki (c) to win the KO-D Openweight Championship	First show in the United States.
4	Impact	United We Stand	Rahway, New Jersey	The Lucha Bros (Fénix and Pentagón Jr.) defeated Rob Van Dam and Sabu in a hardcore match.	
5	WWE: NXT	TakeOver: New York	Brooklyn, New York	Johnny Gargano defeated Adam Cole in a two out of three falls match to win the vacant NXT Championship	Upon winning the NXT Championship, Gargano was recognized as the first NXT Triple Crown Champion
5	RevPro	RevPro UK: Live in NYC	New York City	Suzuki-Gun (Minoru Suzuki and Zack Sabre Jr.) defeated Hiroshi Tanahashi and Will Ospreay	
5	Stardom	American Dream	Queens, New York	Mayu Iwatani, Arisa Hoshiki, Saki Kashima and Tam Nakano defeated Kagetsu, Session Moth Martina, Andras Miyagi, and Jamie Hayter	
5	MLW	Battle Riot II	Queens, New York	LA Park won by last eliminating Sami Callihan in a 40-man Battle Riot match for a future MLW World Heavyweight Championship match	
6	ROH; NJPW	G1 Supercard	New York City	Kazuchika Okada defeated Jay White (c) to win the IWGP Heavyweight Championship	First non-WWE event to sell out Madison Square Garden
7	WWE: Raw; SmackDown; 205 Live	WrestleMania 35	East Rutherford, New Jersey	Becky Lynch defeated Ronda Rousey (Raw Women's Champion) and Charlotte Flair (SmackDown Women's Champion) in a Winner Takes All triple threat match	This featured the final matches of Kurt Angle and Batista, as well as the first women's match to main event a WrestleMania. The main event went past midnight ET, thus the match ended on April 8, the date recognized for the title change.
14	ROH	Masters of the Craft	Columbus, Ohio	Villain Enterprises (Marty Scurll, PCO and Brody King) (c) defeated The Kingdom (Matt Taven, T. K. O'Ryan and Vinny Marseglia) to retain the ROH World Six-Man Tag Team Championship	
21	WWE: Raw; SmackDown; 205 Live	The Shield's Final Chapter	Moline, Illinois	The Shield (Dean Ambrose, Seth Rollins, and Roman Reigns) defeated Baron Corbin, Bobby Lashley, and Drew McIntyre	The Shield's and Dean Ambrose's final WWE appearance.
26	CMLL	63. Aniversario de Arena México	Mexico City, Mexico	Bárbaro Cavernario and Titán defeated Último Guerrero and Volador Jr.	
27	NWA; ROH	Crockett Cup	Concord, North Carolina	Nick Aldis (c) defeated Marty Scurll to retain the NWA World Heavyweight Championship	
28	Impact	Rebellion	Toronto, Canada	The Latin American Xchange (Ortiz and Santana) defeated The Lucha Bros (Fénix and Pentagón Jr.) (c) in a Full Metal Mayhem match to win the Impact World Tag Team Championship	
29	NJPW	Wrestling Hinokuni	Mashiki, Kumamoto	Jay White defeated Hirooki Goto	
(c) – denotes defending champion(s)

=== May ===
Date	Promotion(s)	Event	Location	Main Event	Notes
3	NJPW	Wrestling Dontaku	Fukuoka, Japan	Dragon Lee (c) defeated Taiji Ishimori to retain the IWGP Junior Heavyweight Championship	
4	NJPW	Wrestling Dontaku	Fukuoka, Japan	Kazuchika Okada (c) defeated Sanada to retain the IWGP Heavyweight Championship	
5	Impact	Code Red	New York City	Sami Callihan defeated Tommy Dreamer	This show aired live on Impact Plus
8	ROH; NJPW	War of the Worlds	Buffalo, New York	Flip Gordon defeated Bandido	
9	ROH; NJPW	War of the Worlds	Toronto, Ontario, Canada	Matt Taven (c) defeated PCO to retain the ROH World Championship.	
11	ROH; NJPW	War of the Worlds	Grand Rapids, Michigan	Satoshi Kojima, Yuji Nagata, Hirooki Goto, Jay Lethal and Jeff Cobb defeated Bully Ray, Shane Taylor, Silas Young and The Briscoes	
12	ROH; NJPW	War of the Worlds	Chicago, Illinois	Jeff Cobb defeated Jay Lethal, PCO and Rush	
10	RevPro	Epic Encounter	London, England	El Phantasmo defeats David Starr (c) to win the Undisputed British Cruiserweight Championship in a Ladder Match	
12	RevPro	Mayhem	Portsmouth, Hampshire, England, UK	Minoru Suzuki defeats Sha Samuels in a Single Match	
19	WWE: Raw; SmackDown; 205 Live	Money in the Bank	Hartford, Connecticut	Brock Lesnar defeated Ali, Andrade, Baron Corbin, Drew McIntyre, Finn Bálor, Randy Orton, and Ricochet to win the men's Money in the Bank ladder match for a world championship match contract	Bayley won the women's Money in the Bank ladder match and then cashed in the contract that same night to win the SmackDown Women's Championship – Bayley was subsequently recognized as WWE's first women's Triple Crown and Grand Slam winner.
25	AEW	Double or Nothing	Las Vegas, Nevada	Chris Jericho defeated Kenny Omega to earn a future AEW World Championship match against the Casino Battle Royale winner ("Hangman" Adam Page) to determine the inaugural champion	AEW's inaugural show
31	CMLL	Juicio Final	Mexico City, Mexico	Último Guerrero defeated Máscara Año 2000 in a Best two-out-of-three falls Lucha de Apuestas, hair Vs hair match	
(c) – denotes defending champion(s)

=== June ===
Date	Promotion(s)	Event	Location	Main Event	Notes
1	MLW	Fury Road	Waukesha, Wisconsin	Teddy Hart (c) defeated Jimmy Havoc to retain the MLW World Middleweight Championship	
1	WWE: NXT	TakeOver: XXV	Bridgeport, Connecticut	Adam Cole defeated Johnny Gargano (c) to win the NXT Championship	
2	ROH	State of the Art	Portland, Oregon	Matt Taven defeated PCO, Flip Gordon and Mark Haskins in a Defy or Deny match	
7	WWE: Raw; SmackDown; 205 Live	Super ShowDown	Jeddah, Saudi Arabia	The Undertaker defeated Goldberg	Featured the largest standard battle royal in WWE history with a total of 51 participants
8	Impact	A Night You Can't Mist	Philadelphia, Pennsylvania	The Great Muta & Tommy Dreamer defeated Johnny Impact & Michael Elgin	This show aired live on Impact Plus
9	NJPW	Dominion 6.9 in Osaka-jo Hall	Osaka, Japan	Kazuchika Okada (c) defeated Chris Jericho to retain the IWGP Heavyweight Championship	
16	AAA	Verano de Escándalo	Mérida, Yucatán	Dr. Wagner Jr. and Psycho Clown defeated Blue Demon Jr. and Taurus	
23	WWE: Raw; SmackDown; 205 Live	Stomping Grounds	Tacoma, Washington	Seth Rollins (c) defeated Baron Corbin in a no countout, no disqualification match to retain the WWE Universal Championship with Lacey Evans as the special guest referee.	
28	ROH	Best in the World	Baltimore, Maryland	Matt Taven (c) defeated Jeff Cobb to retain the ROH World Championship	
29	NJPW	Southern Showdown	Melbourne, Australia	Kazuchika Okada and Hiroshi Tanahashi defeated Bullet Club (Jay White and Bad Luck Fale)	First-ever NJPW pay-per-view event in Australia
29	AEW	Fyter Fest	Daytona Beach, Florida	Jon Moxley defeated Joey Janela in a Non-sanctioned match	Jon Moxley's AEW debut match
29	RevPro	Ungovernable	Manchester, England, UK	Zack Sabre Jr. (c) defeats SANADA to retain the Undisputed British Heavyweight Championship	
(c) – denotes defending champion(s)

=== July ===
Date	Promotion(s)	Event	Location	Main Event	Notes
5	Impact	Bash at the Brewery	San Antonio, Texas	Rob Van Dam defeated Sami Callihan in an Extreme Rules match	
6	MLW	Kings of Colosseum	Cicero, Illinois	Jacob Fatu defeated Tom Lawlor (c) to win the MLW World Heavyweight Championship	
6	NJPW	G1 Climax in Dallas	Dallas, Texas	Kazuchika Okada defeated Hiroshi Tanahashi	The first ever G1 Climax show to take place outside of Japan
7	Impact	Slammiversary XVII	Dallas, Texas	Sami Callihan defeated Tessa Blanchard	
13	AEW	Fight for the Fallen	Jacksonville, Florida	The Young Bucks (Matt Jackson and Nick Jackson) defeated The Brotherhood (Cody and Dustin Rhodes)	
13	Evolve; WWE	Evolve 131	Philadelphia, Pennsylvania	Adam Cole (c) defeated Akira Tozawa to retain the NXT Championship	This was the first independent wrestling show to stream live on WWE Network
14	WWE: Raw; SmackDown; 205 Live	Extreme Rules	Philadelphia, Pennsylvania	Seth Rollins (c) and Becky Lynch (c) defeated Baron Corbin and Lacey Evans in a Last Chance Winners Take All Extreme Rules mixed tag team match to retain their respective WWE Universal Championship and WWE Raw Women's Championship, then Brock Lesnar cashed in his Money in the Bank contract and defeated Rollins (c) in a singles match to win the WWE Universal Championship	This event featured The Undertaker's last match in front of a live audience in the United States before his retirement in 2020
15	DDT	Wrestle Peter Pan 2019	Tokyo, Japan	Konosuke Takeshita defeated Tetsuya Endo (c) by submission to win the KO-D Openweight Championship	
19	CMLL	Liger: El Adiós de México en la Arena México	Mexico City, Mexico	Jushin "Thunder" Liger defeated Carístico, Negro Casas, and Último Guerrero	Jushin Thunder Liger's last appearance in Mexico
20	ROH	Manhattan Mayhem	New York City	The Briscoes (Jay Briscoe and Mark Briscoe) defeated The Guerrillas of Destiny (Tama Tonga and Tanga Loa) (c) to win the ROH World Tag Team Championship	
21	ROH	Mass Hysteria	Lowell, Massachusetts	Jay Lethal, Alex Shelley and Jonathan Gresham defeated The Kingdom (Matt Taven, T. K. O'Ryan and Vinny Marseglia)	
25	MLW	Never Say Never	Queens, New York City, New York	LA Park defeated Jimmy Havoc in a Street Fight	
27	WWE: SmackDown	Smackville	Nashville, Tennessee	Kofi Kingston (c) defeated Dolph Ziggler and Samoa Joe to retain the WWE Championship	
(c) – denotes defending champion(s)

=== August ===
Date	Promotion(s)	Event	Location	Main Event	Notes
2	Impact	Unbreakable	Santa Ana, California	Sami Callihan defeated Tessa Blanchard for an Impact World Championship match at Bound for Glory	
3	AAA	Triplemanía XXVII	Mexico City	Blue Demon Jr. (mask) defeated Dr. Wagner Jr. (hair) in a Lucha de Apuestas, mask vs. hair match	This was Cain Velasquez's in-ring debut
9	CMLL; NJPW; ROH	Summer Supercard	Toronto, Ontario, Canada	The Briscoe Brothers (Jay Briscoe and Mark Briscoe) (c) defeated Guerrillas of Destiny (Tama Tonga and Tanga Loa) in a Ladder War X to retain the ROH World Tag Team Championship	
10	WWE: NXT	TakeOver: Toronto	Toronto, Ontario, Canada	Adam Cole (c) defeated Johnny Gargano in a two out of three falls match to retain the NXT Championship	
11	WWE: Raw; SmackDown; 205 Live	SummerSlam	Toronto, Ontario, Canada	Seth Rollins defeated Brock Lesnar (c) to win the WWE Universal Championship	This show presented the first match of Bray Wyatt's "The Fiend" character/gimmick.
12	NJPW	G1 Climax 29 Final	Chiyoda, Tokyo	Kota Ibushi defeated Jay White to win the G1 Climax 29	
17	WWC	Aniversario 46	Guaynabo, Puerto Rico	Orlando Colón defeats The Precious One Gilbert (c) to win the WWC Universal Championship	
18	RevPro	RevPro Seven Year Anniversary	Cheltenham, Gloucestershire, England, UK	Jushin Thunder Liger & Michael Oku defeat Chris Brookes & Hikuleo in a Tag Team Match	
24	ROH	Saturday Night at Center Stage	Atlanta, Georgia	Jay Lethal, Jeff Cobb, Kenny King & Rush defeated The Briscoes, Matt Taven & Shane Taylor	This show aired live on Honor Club
25	ROH	Honor For All	Nashville, Tennessee	Jeff Cobb defeated Kenny King, Jay Lethal and Matt Taven in a Defy or Deny match	This show aired live on Honor Club
25	NJPW	Super J-Cup Final	Long Beach, California	El Phantasmo defeated Dragon Lee to win the Super J-Cup	
30	CMLL	International Gran Prix	Mexico City, Mexico	Volador Jr. won the 2019 International Gran Prix; Team Mexico (Rush, Soberano Jr., Diamante Azul, Dragon Lee, Negro Casas, Volador Jr. and Cuatrero) defeated Team Resto del Mundo (Matt Taven, Jay Briscoe, Kenny King, Delirious, Oraculo, Big Daddy, Mecha Wolf 450 and Luke Hawx)	
31	NJPW	Royal Quest	London, England	Kazuchika Okada (c) defeated Minoru Suzuki to retain the IWGP Heavyweight Championship	
31	WWE: NXT UK	TakeOver: Cardiff	Cardiff, Wales	Walter (c) defeated Tyler Bate to retain the WWE United Kingdom Championship	
31	AEW	All Out	Hoffman Estates, Illinois	Chris Jericho defeated Adam Page to win the inaugural AEW World Championship	First event to feature the AEW World Championship
(c) – denotes defending champion(s)

=== September ===
Date	Promotion(s)	Event	Location	Main Event	Notes
6	ROH; CMLL	Global Wars Espectacular	Dearborn, Michigan	Bandido defeated Jay Briscoe	
7	ROH; CMLL	Global Wars Espectacular	Villa Park, Illinois	Villain Enterprises (Flip Gordon, Brody King, and PCO) defeated Lifeblood (Bandido, Tracy Williams, and Mark Haskins)	
8	ROH; CMLL	Global Wars Espectacular	Milwaukee, Wisconsin	Rush and Jeff Cobb defeated The Kingdom (Matt Taven and Vinny Marseglia)	
7	MLW	War Chamber	North Richland Hills, Texas	Marshall Von Erich, Ross Von Erich, Low Ki and Tom Lawlor defeated Contra Unit (Jacob Fatu, Josef Samael, Simon Gotch and Ikuro Kwon)	
14	Impact	Victory Road	Enid, Oklahoma	Michael Elgin defeated TJP	
15	WWE: Raw; SmackDown; 205 Live	Clash of Champions	Charlotte, North Carolina	Seth Rollins (c) defeated Braun Strowman to retain the WWE Universal Championship	
15	AAA; Impact	Lucha Invades NY	New York City	Dr. Wagner Jr. defeated Blue Demon Jr.	
15	NJPW	Destruction in Beppu	Beppu, Japan	Zack Sabre Jr. defeated Hiroshi Tanahashi (c) to win the British Heavyweight Championship	
16	NJPW	Destruction in Kagoshima	Kagoshima, Japan	Kota Ibushi (c) defeated Kenta to retain the Tokyo Dome IWGP Heavyweight Championship challenge rights certificate	
22	NJPW	Destruction in Kobe	Kobe, Japan	Jay White defeated Tetsuya Naito (c) to win the IWGP Intercontinental Championship	
19–22	PWG	Battle of Los Angeles	Reseda, California	Bandido defeated David Starr and Jonathan Gresham in a tournament final match	
27	ROH	Death Before Dishonor XVII	Las Vegas, Nevada	Rush defeated Matt Taven (c) to win the ROH World Championship	
27	CMLL	CMLL 86th Anniversary Show	Mexico City, Mexico	Último Guerrero defeated Negro Casas in a Luchas de Apuestas, hair vs hair, Steel Cage match Also in the match: Bárbaro Cavernario, Big Daddy, Ciber the Main Man, Gilbert el Boricua, and Volador Jr.	
(c) – denotes defending champion(s)

=== October ===
Date	Promotion(s)	Event	Location	Main Event	Notes
4	WWE: SmackDown	SmackDown's 20th Anniversary	Los Angeles, California	Brock Lesnar defeated Kofi Kingston (c) to win the WWE Championship	Lesnar's first televised non-pay-per-view match in 15 years.
5	MLW; The Crash	The Crash/MLW	Tijuana, Mexico	La Rebelión Amarilla (Bestia 666 and Mecha Wolf 450) and L.A. Park defeated Contra Unit (Ikuro Kwon, Josef Samael, and Simon Gotch)	
6	WWE: Raw; SmackDown	Hell in a Cell	Sacramento, California	Seth Rollins (c) vs. "The Fiend" Bray Wyatt for the WWE Universal Championship in a Hell in a Cell match ended by referee stoppage	
12	ROH	Glory By Honor XVII	New Orleans, Louisiana	PCO defeated Marty Scurll for a ROH World Championship match at Final Battle	
14	NJPW	King of Pro-Wrestling	Tokyo, Japan	Kazuchika Okada (c) defeated Sanada to retain the IWGP Heavyweight Championship	
18	Impact	Prelude to Glory	South Bend, Indiana	Naomichi Marufuji, Rhino and Rob Van Dam defeated The North (Ethan Page and Josh Alexander) and Michael Elgin	
19	AAA	Héroes Inmortales XIII	Orizaba, Veracruz	Pentagón Jr. won the four team Relevos Increíbles steel cage match that also included his tag team partner Texano Jr. as well as the teams of Psycho Clown/Rey Escorpión, Averno/Dr. Wagner Jr. and Chessman/Pagano	
20	Impact	Bound for Glory	Chicago, Illinois	Brian Cage (c) defeated Sami Callihan to retain the Impact World Championship	
31	WWE: Raw; SmackDown	Crown Jewel	Riyadh, Saudi Arabia	"The Fiend" Bray Wyatt defeated Seth Rollins (c) in a Falls Count Anywhere match that could not be stopped for any reason to win the WWE Universal Championship	Featured the first women's match (Natalya vs. Lacey Evans) to take place in Saudi Arabia.
(c) – denotes defending champion(s)

=== November ===
Date	Promotion(s)	Event	Location	Main Event	Notes
1	CMLL	Día de Muertos	Mexico City, Mexico	La Alianza de Plata y Oro (Carístico and Místico) defeated Los Guerreros Lagunero (Euforia and Gran Guerrero) (c) to win the CMLL World Tag Team Championship	
1	The Crash	The Crash VIII Aniversario	Tijuana, Baja California, Mexico	Los Lucha Bros (Penta El 0M and Rey Fénix) defeated Los Hermanos Muñoz (Dragon Lee and Rush El Toro Blanco) by disqualification	
2	MLW	Saturday Night SuperFight	Chicago, Illinois	Jacob Fatu (c) defeated LA Park to retain the MLW World Heavyweight Championship	
3	DDT	Ultimate Party 2019	Tokyo, Japan	Harashima (Extreme) defeated Konosuke Takeshita (KO-D) in a Title vs. Title match for the KO-D Openweight Championship and the DDT Extreme Division Championship	
3	NJPW	Power Struggle	Osaka, Japan	Jay White (c) defeated Hirooki Goto to retain the IWGP Intercontinental Championship	
9	AEW	Full Gear	Baltimore, Maryland	Jon Moxley defeated Kenny Omega in an Unsanctioned Lights Out match	
9	Impact	Turning Point	Hazleton, Pennsylvania	Sami Callihan (c) defeated Brian Cage to retain the Impact World Championship	
9	MLW	Blood and Thunder	Orlando, Florida	Myron Reed defeated Teddy Hart (c) to win the MLW World Middleweight Championship	
9	NJPW	Showdown	San Jose, California	Chaos (Kazuchika Okada and Will Ospreay) defeated Kota Ibushi and Amazing Red	
11	NJPW	Showdown	Los Angeles, California	Los Ingobernables de Japón (Tetsuya Naito, Shingo Takagi and Bushi) defeated Bullet Club (Jay White, Chase Owens and Gedo)	
23	WWE: NXT	TakeOver: WarGames	Rosemont, Illinois	Team Ciampa (Tommaso Ciampa, Keith Lee, Dominik Dijakovic, and Kevin Owens) defeated The Undisputed Era (Adam Cole, Bobby Fish, Kyle O'Reilly, and Roderick Strong) in a WarGames match	This event featured the first Women's WarGames Match.
24	WWE: Raw; SmackDown; NXT	Survivor Series	Rosemont, Illinois	Shayna Baszler (NXT Women's Champion) defeated Becky Lynch (Raw Women's Champion) and Bayley (SmackDown Women's Champion) in a non-title triple threat match by making Bayley submit	First Survivor Series to feature the NXT brand.
27	AEW	Thanksgiving Eve Dynamite	Chicago, Illinois	Chris Jericho (c) defeated Scorpio Sky by pinfall to retain the AEW World Championship.	
(c) – denotes defending champion(s)

=== December ===
Date	Promotion(s)	Event	Location	Main Event	Notes
1	WWE: Raw; SmackDown	Starrcade	Duluth, Georgia	Bobby Lashley defeated Kevin Owens by disqualification	
1	AAA	Triplemanía Regia	Monterrey, Nuevo León	Aero Star defeated Monster Clown in a Steel cage Lucha de Apuestas, Mask vs. Hair match Psycho Clown, Blue Demon Jr., Dr. Wagner Jr., Texano Jr., Rey Escorpión, and Chessman were also involved in the match.	
5	MLW	Opera Cup	Queens, New York City, New York	Davey Boy Smith Jr. defeated Brian Pillman Jr. to win 2019 Opera Cup	
6	CMLL	Leyendas Mexicanas	Mexico City, Mexico	Rayo de Jalisco Jr., Tinieblas Jr., and Villano IV defeated El Canek, Fuerza Guerrera, and Máscara Año 2000 in a Six-man "Lucha Libre rules" tag team match	
6	WWE: Raw; SmackDown	Tribute to the Troops	Jacksonville, North Carolina	Seth Rollins defeated Erick Rowan in a singles match	This was the first Tribute to the Troops that was not aired on television.
7	Impact	No Surrender	Dayton, Ohio	Sami Callihan (c) defeated Rich Swann to retain the Impact World Championship	
13	ROH	Final Battle	Baltimore, Maryland	PCO defeated Rush (c) to win the ROH World Championship	
14	NWA	Into the Fire	Atlanta, Georgia	Nick Aldis (c) defeated James Storm in a Two-out-of-three falls match to retain the NWA World Heavyweight Championship	
14	AAA	Guerra de Titanes	Ciudad Madero, Tamaulipas	Blue Demon Jr., Rey Escorpión and Rush El Toro Blanco defeated Psycho Clown, Dr. Wagner Jr., and Drago in a No disqualification Trios match	
15	WWE: Raw; SmackDown	TLC: Tables, Ladders & Chairs	Minneapolis, Minnesota	The Kabuki Warriors (Asuka and Kairi Sane) (c) defeated Becky Lynch and Charlotte Flair in a Tables, Ladders, and Chairs match to retain the WWE Women's Tag Team Championship	Featured the first women's tag team Tables, Ladders, and Chairs match.
(c) – denotes defending champion(s)

=== Cancelled events ===
Date	Promotion(s)	Event	Location	Notes
June 16	WWE: Raw; SmackDown	Backlash	San Diego, California	Replaced by Stomping Grounds, which aired on June 23; a house show instead took place on June 16 in San Diego.

== Notable events ==
- April 10 – Dark Side of the Ring premiered on Viceland.
- May 1 – Impact Wrestling launched their online streaming service Impact Plus.
- September 18 – WWE NXT premiered on USA Network.
- October 2 – AEW Dynamite premiered on TNT.
- October 4 – WWE SmackDown premiered on FOX.
- October 8 – AEW Dark premiered on YouTube.
- October 8 – NWA Power premiered on YouTube, Facebook, and FITE TV.
- October 29 – Impact! premiered on AXS TV.
- October 31 – At WWE's Crown Jewel pay-per-view, the first women's match was contested in Saudi Arabia between Natalya and Lacey Evans.
- November 5 – WWE Backstage premiered on Fox Sports 1.

== Accomplishments and tournaments ==
=== AAA ===
Accomplishment	Winner	Date won	Notes
Rey de Reyes	Aero Star	March 16	Defeated Laredo Kid, El Hijo del Vikingo, Jack Evans, Sammy Guevara, Taurus, Golden Magic, Myzteziz Jr. and Eclipse Vengador Jr. in the Rey de Reyes final
Copa Triplemanía	Pagano	August 3	Defeated Chessman, Eclipse Jr., La Parka, Puma King, Aero Star, Drago, Averno, Super Fly, Monster Clown, Murder Clown, Daga, Konnan, Vampiro, and Rey Escorpión to win.
Copa Antonio Peña	El Hijo del Vikingo	October 19	Last eliminated Taurus to win.
Copa Triplemanía Regia	Niño Hamburguesa	December 1	Defeated Mamba, Mr. Iguana, Abismo Negro Jr., Michael Nakazawa, Super Fly, Australian Suicide, Averno, Murder Clown, and La Hiedra to win.

=== AEW ===
Accomplishment	Winner(s)	Date won	Notes
Casino Battle Royale (Men)	Adam Page	May 25	Last eliminated MJF to earn an AEW World Championship match against the winner of Double or Nothing's main event (Chris Jericho) to determine the inaugural champion at All Out on August 31. At All Out, Jericho defeated Page.
Casino Battle Royale (Women)	Nyla Rose	August 31	Last eliminated Dr. Britt Baker, D.M.D. to earn an AEW Women's World Championship match against Riho (who defeated Hikaru Shida at All Out to earn her respective spot) to determine the inaugural champion on Dynamite on October 2. On Dynamite, Riho defeated Rose.
AEW World Tag Team Championship tournament	SoCal Uncensored (Frankie Kazarian and Scorpio Sky)	October 30	Defeated the Lucha Brothers (Pentagón Jr. and Fénix) in the tournament final to determine the inaugural champions.
Dynamite Dozen Battle Royal	Adam Page and MJF	November 20	12-man battle royal to determine the two participants in the Dynamite Diamond Final for the inaugural AEW Dynamite Diamond Ring. Page and MJF co-won the battle royal to face each other at Dynamite: Thanksgiving Eve the following week where MJF defeated Page to become the inaugural ring holder.

=== CMLL ===
Accomplishment	Winner	Date won	Notes
Reyes Del Aire	Titán	January 6	
Universal Champion	El Terrible	February 15	
Torneo Nacional de Parejas Increíbles	Titán and Bárbaro Cavernario	April 26	
Universal Women's Champion	Dalys la Caribeña	August 19	
International Gran Prix	Volador Jr.	August 30	
Torneo Gran Alternativa	Star Jr. and Valiente	October 19	

=== Impact ===
Accomplishment	Winner	Date won	Notes
Mashup Tournament	Sami Callihan	August 2	Defeated Tessa Blanchard in the tournament final to become the #1 contender to the Impact World Championship. He would be unsuccessful in capturing the title at Bound for Glory
Call Your Shot Gauntlet	Eddie Edwards	October 20	Last eliminated Mahabali Shera to win the Call Your Shot trophy for a championship match of his choosing. Edwards would end up in a Best of 5 Series with Michael Elgin for the trophy, but ended 2-2 after the fifth match ended in a double pinfall. Edwards and Elgin were supposed to face Impact World Champion Tessa Blanchard in a three-way match at Rebellion, but Blanchard could not make the show due to COVID-19 travel restrictions. Edwards would subsequently win the title in a five-way elimination match at Slammiversary.

=== MLW ===
Accomplishment	Winner	Date won	Notes
Battle Riot	LA Park	April 5	Last eliminating Sami Callihan to earn an MLW World Heavyweight Championship opportunity. He was unsuccessful in capturing the title at Saturday Night SuperFight
Opera Cup	Davey Boy Smith Jr.	December 5	Defeated Brian Pillman Jr. in the tournament final to win.

=== NJPW ===
Accomplishment	Winner	Date won	Notes
New Japan Cup	Kazuchika Okada	March 24	Defeated Sanada in the tournament final to win.
Best of the Super Juniors	Will Ospreay	June 5	Defeated Shingo Takagi in the tournament final to win.
G1 Climax	Kota Ibushi	August 12	Defeated Jay White in the tournament final to win.
Super J-Cup	El Phantasmo	August 25	Defeated Dragon Lee in the tournament final to win.
Young Lion Cup	Karl Fredericks	September 22	Defeated Shota Umino in the tournament final to win.
Super Junior Tag League	Roppongi 3K (Sho and Yoh)	November 3	Defeated Suzuki-gun (El Desperado and Yoshinobu Kanemaru) in the tournament final to win.
World Tag League	Juice Robinson and David Finlay	December 8	Defeated Los Ingobernables de Japón (Sanada and Evil) in the tournament final to win.

=== NWA ===
Accomplishment	Winner	Date won	Notes
Crockett Cup	Villain Enterprises (Brody King and PCO)	April 27	The team also won the vacant NWA World Tag Team Championship

=== WWE ===
Accomplishment	Winner	Date won	Notes
NXT UK Tag Team Championship tournament	Zack Gibson and James Drake	January 12	Defeated Moustache Mountain (Trent Seven and Tyler Bate) in the tournament final to determine the inaugural champions.
WWE Worlds Collide Tournament	Velveteen Dream	January 27 (aired February 2)	Winner received their choice of a championship match for either the NXT Championship, NXT North American Championship, WWE United Kingdom Championship, or WWE Cruiserweight Championship (the latter could only be chosen if the winner met the weight requirement); Dream defeated Tyler Bate in the finals and chose the NXT North American Championship, which he subsequently won from Johnny Gargano on the January 30 taping of NXT (aired February 20).
Royal Rumble (Women)	Becky Lynch	January 27	Winner received their choice of a championship match for either the Raw Women's Championship or SmackDown Women's Championship at WrestleMania 35; Lynch from SmackDown last eliminated Charlotte Flair to win and chose the Raw Women's Championship, which she subsequently won from Ronda Rousey (along with the SmackDown title, which Flair defended after she was inserted into the WrestleMania match and had won that title to make the WrestleMania match a winner takes all triple threat match).
Royal Rumble (Men)	Seth Rollins	January 27	Winner received their choice of a championship match for either Raw's Universal Championship or SmackDown's WWE Championship at WrestleMania 35; Rollins last eliminated Braun Strowman to win and chose his own brand's Universal Championship, which he subsequently won from Brock Lesnar.
André the Giant Memorial Battle Royal	Braun Strowman	April 7	Last eliminated Saturday Night Live's Colin Jost to win the André the Giant Memorial Trophy.
WrestleMania Women's Battle Royal	Carmella	April 7	Last eliminated Sarah Logan to win the WrestleMania Women's Battle Royal Trophy.
Money in the Bank ladder match (Women)	Bayley	May 19	Defeated Naomi, Dana Brooke, Natalya, Nikki Cross, Ember Moon, Mandy Rose, and Carmella to win a women's championship match contract. Later that night, Bayley cashed in the contract and won the SmackDown Women's Championship from Charlotte Flair, who had just defeated Becky Lynch to win the title.
Money in the Bank ladder match (Men)	Brock Lesnar	May 19	Lesnar, who replaced Sami Zayn as an unannounced entrant after Zayn was attacked backstage and taken to a medical facility, defeated Ricochet, Drew McIntyre, Baron Corbin, Ali, Finn Bálor, Andrade, and Randy Orton to win a world championship match contract. Lesnar cashed in the contract at Extreme Rules on July 14 and won the Universal Championship from Seth Rollins, who had just retained the title in a previous match.
King of the Ring	Baron Corbin	September 16	Defeated Chad Gable in the tournament final to win and be crowned King of the Ring; he subsequently changed his ring name to King Corbin. The tournament final was originally scheduled to occur at Clash of Champions on September 15, but was rescheduled for the following night's Raw.
WWE Tag Team World Cup	The O.C. (Luke Gallows and Karl Anderson)	October 31	This was a tag team turmoil match to determine the "best tag team in the world". The O.C. last eliminated The Viking Raiders (Erik and Ivar) to win the WWE Tag Team World Cup Trophy.

== Title changes ==
=== AEW ===
AEW World Championship
(Title created)
Date	Winner	Event/Show	Note(s)
August 31	Chris Jericho	All Out	Defeated Adam Page to become the inaugural champion.

AEW Women's World Championship
(Title created)
Date	Winner	Event/Show	Note(s)
October 2	Riho	Dynamite	Defeated Nyla Rose to become the inaugural champion.

AEW World Tag Team Championship
(Title created)
Date	Winner	Event/Show	Note(s)
October 30	SoCal Uncensored (Frankie Kazarian and Scorpio Sky)	Dynamite	Defeated the Lucha Brothers (Pentagón Jr. and Fénix) in the tournament final to become the inaugural champions.

=== CMLL ===
CMLL World Heavyweight Championship
Incoming champion – Último Guerrero
No title changes

CMLL World Middleweight Championship
Incoming champion – El Cuatrero
No title changes

CMLL World Tag Team Championship
Incoming champions – Diamante Azul and Valiente
Date	Winner	Event/Show	Note(s)
May 31	Los Guerreros Laguneros (Euforia and Gran Guerrero)	Juicio Final	
November 1	Alianza de Plata y Oro (Carístico and Místico)	Día de Muertos	Carístico's first four reigns were under the name Místico. The current Místico took over the name in 2012.

CMLL Arena Coliseo Tag Team Championship
Incoming champions – Esfinge and Tritón
No title changes

CMLL World Trios Championship
Incoming champions – Los Guerreros Laguneros (Euforia, Gran Guerrero, and Último Guerrero)
No title changes

CMLL World Women's Championship
Incoming champion – Marcela
No title changes

NWA World Historic Light Heavyweight Championship
Incoming champion – Stuka Jr.
No title changes

NWA World Historic Middleweight Championship
Incoming champion – Carístico
No title changes

NWA World Historic Welterweight Championship
Incoming champion – Volador Jr.
No title changes

Occidente Heavyweight Championship
Incoming champion – Furia Roja
No title changes

=== FIP ===
FIP World Heavyweight Championship
Incoming champion – Anthony Henry
No title changes

FIP Florida Heritage Championship
Incoming champion – Jon Davis
No title changes

FIP World Tag Team Championship
Incoming champion – The End (Odinson and Parrow)
Date	Winner	Event/Show	Note(s)
March 3	The Precipice (Chance Auren and Omar Amir)	Ascension	
November 1	The Skulk (Adrian Alanis and Liam Gray)	In Full Force	

=== Impact Wrestling ===
Impact World Championship
Incoming champion – Johnny Impact
Date	Winner	Event/Show	Note(s)
April 28	Brian Cage	Rebellion	Lance Storm was the special guest referee.
October 25 (aired October 29)	Sami Callihan	Impact!	Steel cage match.

Impact X Division Championship
Incoming champion – Vacant
Date	Winner	Event/Show	Note(s)
January 6	Rich Swann	Homecoming	Ultimate X match, also involving Ethan Page, Jake Crist, and Trey Miguel.
July 19 (aired July 26)	Jake Crist	Impact!	
October 20	Ace Austin	Bound for Glory	Intergender ladder match, also involving Acey Romero, Daga, and Tessa Blanchard.

Impact Knockouts Championship
Incoming champion – Tessa Blanchard
Date	Winner	Event/Show	Note(s)
January 6	Taya Valkyrie	Homecoming	Gail Kim served as special guest referee.

Impact World Tag Team Championship
Incoming champions – The Latin American Xchange (Ortiz and Santana)
Date	Winner	Event/Show	Note(s)
January 13 (aired February 8)	The Lucha Bros (Pentagon Jr. and Fenix)	Impact!	
April 28	The Latin American Xchange (Santana and Ortiz)	Rebellion	
July 5	The North (Ethan Page and Josh Alexander)	Bash at the Brewery	

=== IWRG ===
IWRG Intercontinental Heavyweight Championship
Incoming champion – Máscara Año 2000, Jr.
Date	Winner	Event/Show	Note(s)
April 14	El Hijo de Canis Lupus	IWRG 80. Torneo FILL	El Hijo de Canis Lupus defeated Máscara Año 2000 Jr. by count-out. Even so, it was considered a title change.

IWRG Intercontinental Lightweight Championship
Incoming champion – Vacant
No title changes

IWRG Intercontinental Middleweight Championship
Incoming champion – Imposible
No title changes

IWRG Intercontinental Tag Team Championship
Incoming champions – Capo del Norte and Capo del Sur
Date	Winner	Event/Show	Note(s)
January 1	Los Oficiales (Oficial AK-47 and Oficial 911)	IWRG 23rd Anniversary Show	
February 24	Vacated	N/A	Title was vacated due to Oficial 911 being unable to defend the championship.
March 24	Aramís and Imposible	IWRG show	Won a six-team tag team tournament to win the vacant title.
November 25	Vacated	N/A	Championship vacated for undisclosed reasons
December 1	Bryce Benjamin and Marshe Rockett	PALL 1st Anniversary Show	Won a six-team tag team tournament for the vacant title.

IWRG Intercontinental Trios Championship
Incoming champions – Centella de Oro, Multifacético, and Prayer
No title changes

IWRG Intercontinental Welterweight Championship
Incoming champion – Cerebro Negro
No title changes

IWRG Junior de Juniors Championship
Incoming champion – El Hijo de Canis Lupus
Date	Winner	Event/Show	Note(s)
March 31	El Hijo del Médico Asesino	IWRG show	

IWRG Rey del Aire Championship
Incoming champion – Dragón Bane
No title changes

IWRG Rey del Ring Championship
Incoming champion – Emperador Azteca
No title changes

Distrito Federal Trios Championship
Incoming champions – Los Comandos Elite (Oficial Rayan, Oficial Spector and Oficial Liderk)
Date	Winner	Event/Show	Note(s)
February 3	El Infierno Eterno (Demonio Infernal, Eterno, and Lunatic Xtreme)	IWRG show	

=== Lucha Libre AAA Worldwide ===
AAA Mega Championship
Incoming champion – Fénix
Date	Winner	Event/Show	Note(s)
October 19	Kenny Omega	Héroes Inmortales XIII	

AAA World Cruiserweight Championship
Incoming champion – Sammy Guevara
Date	Winner	Event/Show	Note(s)
February 16	Laredo Kid	AAA Conquista Total	

AAA World Mini-Estrella Championship
Incoming champion – Mini Psycho Clown
Date	Winner	Event/Show	Note(s)
March 16	Dinastía	AAA Vive Latino show	

AAA Latin American Championship
Incoming champion – Drago
Date	Winner	Event/Show	Note(s)
October 19	Daga	Héroes Inmortales XIII	

AAA Reina de Reinas Championship
Incoming champion – Lady Shani
Date	Winner	Event/Show	Note(s)
June 16	Keyra	Verano de Escándalo	
August 3	Vacated	Triplemanía XXVII	Title was vacated due to Keyra suffering an injury.
August 3	Tessa Blanchard	Triplemanía XXVII	Seven-woman Tables, Ladders, and Chairs match, also involving Lady Shani, Taya, Faby Apache, Chik Tormenta, La Hiedra, and Ayako Hamada.
September 15	Taya Valkyrie	Lucha Invades NY	Taya Valkyrie was previously known as Taya.

AAA World Tag Team Championship
Incoming champions – El Texano Jr. and Rey Escorpión
Date	Winner	Event/Show	Note(s)
March 16	Lucha Brothers (Fenix and Pentagón Jr.)	Rey de Reyes	
March 16	The Young Bucks (Matt Jackson and Nick Jackson)	Rey de Reyes	
June 16	Lucha Brothers (Fenix and Pentagón Jr.)	Verano de Escándalo	

AAA World Mixed Tag Team Championship
Incoming champions – Big Mami and Niño Hamburguesa
Date	Winner	Event/Show	Note(s)
August 3	Lady Maravilla and Villano III Jr.	Triplemanía XXVII	

AAA World Trios Championship
Incoming champions – El Hijo del Vikingo, Laredo Kid, and Myzteziz Jr.
Date	Winner	Event/Show	Note(s)
August 3	Vacated	Triplemanía XXVII	The title was vacated due to Laredo Kid leaving the group to focus on his individual career.
August 3	Jinetes del Aire (El Hijo del Vikingo, Golden Magic, and Myzteziz Jr.)	Triplemanía XXVII	Three-way match for the vacant title, also involving El Nuevo Poder del Norte (Mocho Cota Jr., Carta Brava Jr., and Tito Santana) and Las Fresas Salvajes (Pimpinela Escarlata, Mamba, and Máximo).

=== MLW ===
MLW World Heavyweight Championship
Incoming champion – Low Ki
Date	Winner	Event/Show	Note(s)
February 2	Tom Lawlor	Superfight	
July 6	Jacob Fatu	Kings of the Colosseum	

MLW World Tag Team Championship
Incoming champions – Lucha Brothers (Penta el 0M and Rey Fénix)
Date	Winner	Event/Show	Note(s)
February 2	The Hart Foundation (Teddy Hart, Davey Boy Smith Jr., and Brian Pillman Jr.)	Superfight	Hart and Smith won the match, but Pillman also defended the title under the Freebird Rule.
July 5 (aired July 13)	The Dynasty (MJF and Richard Holliday)	Fusion	Ladder match. Hart and Pillman represented The Hart Foundation.
November 2	The Von Erichs (Marshall Von Erich and Ross Von Erich)	Saturday Night SuperFight	Texas Tornado match.

MLW World Middleweight Championship
Incoming champion – Teddy Hart
Date	Winner	Event/Show	Note(s)
November 9	Myron Reed	Blood & Thunder	

MLW National Openweight Championship
(Title created)
Date	Winner	Event/Show	Note(s)
June 1	Alexander Hammerstone	Fury Road	Defeated Brian Pillman Jr. in the finals of a four-man tournament to become the inaugural champion.

=== NJPW ===
IWGP Heavyweight Championship
Incoming champion – Kenny Omega
Date	Winner	Event/Show	Note(s)
January 4	Hiroshi Tanahashi	Wrestle Kingdom 13	
February 11	Jay White	The New Beginning in Osaka	
April 6	Kazuchika Okada	G1 Supercard	

IWGP Intercontinental Championship
Incoming champion – Chris Jericho
Date	Winner	Event/Show	Note(s)
January 4	Tetsuya Naito	Wrestle Kingdom 13	No disqualification match.
April 6	Kota Ibushi	G1 Supercard	
June 9	Tetsuya Naito	Dominion 6.9 in Osaka-jo Hall	
September 22	Jay White	Destruction in Kobe	

IWGP United States Heavyweight Championship
Incoming champion – Cody
Date	Winner	Event/Show	Note(s)
January 4	Juice Robinson	Wrestle Kingdom 13	
June 5	Jon Moxley	Best of the Super Juniors 26 Final	
October 14	Vacated	King of Pro Wrestling	Jon Moxley was forced to relinquish the title as he was unable to attend the event due to Typhoon Hagibis.
October 14	Lance Archer	King of Pro Wrestling	Defeated Juice Robinson to win the vacant championship.

IWGP Tag Team Championship
Incoming champions – Guerrillas of Destiny (Tama Tonga and Tanga Loa)
Date	Winner	Event/Show	Note(s)
January 4	Los Ingobernables de Japón (Sanada and Evil)	Wrestle Kingdom 13	Three-way match, also involving The Young Bucks (Matt Jackson and Nick Jackson).
February 23	Guerrillas of Destiny (Tama Tonga and Tanga Loa)	Honor Rising: Japan	

IWGP Junior Heavyweight Championship
Incoming champion – Kushida
Date	Winner	Event/Show	Note(s)
January 4	Taiji Ishimori	Wrestle Kingdom 13	
April 6	Dragon Lee	G1 Supercard	
June 9	Will Ospreay	Dominion 6.9 in Osaka-jo Hall	

IWGP Junior Heavyweight Tag Team Championship
Incoming champions – Suzuki-gun (El Desperado and Yoshinobu Kanemaru)
Date	Winner	Event/Show	Note(s)
January 4	Los Ingobernables de Japón (Bushi and Shingo Takagi)	Wrestle Kingdom 13	Three-way match, also involving Roppongi 3K (Sho and Yoh, accompanied by Rocky Romero).
March 6	Roppongi 3K (Sho and Yoh)	Anniversary Show	
June 16	Bullet Club (El Phantasmo and Taiji Ishimori)	Kizuna Road	

NEVER Openweight Championship
Incoming champion – Kota Ibushi
Date	Winner	Event/Show	Note(s)
January 4	Will Ospreay	Wrestle Kingdom 13	
April 6	Jeff Cobb	G1 Supercard	
May 3	Taichi	Wrestling Dontaku	
June 9	Tomohiro Ishii	Dominion 6.9 in Osaka-jo Hall	
August 31	Kenta	Royal Quest	

NEVER Openweight 6-Man Tag Team Championship
Incoming champions – Bullet Club (Tama Tonga, Tanga Loa, and Taiji Ishimori)
Date	Winner	Event/Show	Note(s)
January 30	Taguchi Japan (Ryusuke Taguchi, Togi Makabe, and Toru Yano)	Road to The New Beginning	

=== NWA ===
NWA Worlds Heavyweight Championship
Incoming champion – Nick Aldis
No title changes

NWA World Women's Championship
Incoming champion – Jazz
Date	Winner	Event/Show	Note(s)
April 22	Vacated	N/A	Jazz vacated the title due to medical and personal reasons.
April 27	Allysin Kay	Crockett Cup	Defeated Santana Garrett to win the vacant championship.

NWA National Heavyweight Championship
Incoming champion – Willie Mack
Date	Winner	Event/Show	Note(s)
April 27	Colt Cabana	Crockett Cup	
June 29	James Storm	Best in the World	
October 1	Colt Cabana	NWA Power	
December 14	Aron Stevens	Into the Fire	Triple threat match, also involving Ricky Starks.

NWA World Tag Team Championship
Incoming champions – Vacant
Date	Winner	Event/Show	Note(s)
April 27	Villain Enterprises (Brody King and PCO)	Crockett Cup	Defeated Royce Isaacs and Thomas Latimer in the finals of the Crockett Cup Tournament to win the vacant title.
September 7	The Wild Cards (Thom Latimer and Royce Isaacs)	Global Wars Espectacular	
October 1	Rock 'n' Roll Express (Ricky Morton and Robert Gibson)	NWA Power	

=== ROH ===
ROH World Championship
Incoming champion – Jay Lethal
Date	Winner	Event/Show	Note(s)
April 6	Matt Taven	G1 Supercard	
September 27	Rush	Death Before Dishonor XVII	
December 13	PCO	Final Battle	Friday The 13th Massacre Match

ROH World Television Championship
Incoming champion – Jeff Cobb
Date	Winner	Event/Show	Note(s)
May 9	Shane Taylor	War of the Worlds	Four Corner Survival match, also featuring Hirooki Goto and Brody King
December 13	Dragon Lee	Final Battle	

ROH World Tag Team Championship
Incoming champions – The Briscoe Brothers (Jay Briscoe and Mark Briscoe)
Date	Winner	Event/Show	Note(s)
March 15	Villain Enterprises (Brody King and PCO)	ROH 17th Anniversary Show	
April 6	Guerrillas of Destiny (Tama Tonga and Tanga Loa)	G1 Supercard	
July 20	The Briscoe Brothers (Jay Briscoe and Mark Briscoe)	Manhattan Mayhem	NYC Street Fight
December 13	Jay Lethal and Jonathan Gresham	Final Battle	

ROH World Six-Man Tag Team Championship
Incoming champions – The Kingdom (Matt Taven, T. K. O'Ryan, and Vinny Marseglia)
Date	Winner	Event/Show	Note(s)
March 16	Villain Enterprises (Brody King, Marty Scurll, and PCO)	Ring of Honor Wrestling	

Women of Honor Championship
Incoming champion – Kelly Klein
Date	Winner	Event/Show	Note(s)
February 10	Mayu Iwatani	Bound By Honor	
April 6	Kelly Klein	G1 Supercard	
September 27	Angelina Love	Death Before Dishonor XVII	
October 12	Kelly Klein	Glory By Honor XVII	

=== The Crash Lucha Libre ===
The Crash Heavyweight Championship
Incoming champion – Willie Mack
Date	Winner	Event/Show	Note(s)
March 2	Austin Theory	The Crash	Four-way match, also involving Bárbaro Cavernario and Sansón.
May 4	Rey Horus	The Crash	Four-way match, also involving Adam Brooks and Maxwell Jacob Friedman.
November 23	Bandido	The Crash	Three-way match, also involving Marty Scurll.

The Crash Cruiserweight Championship
Incoming champion – Bandido
Date	Winner	Event/Show	Note(s)
March 23	Jonathan Gresham	The Crash	Four-way match, also involving Flamita and Shane Strickland.
November 1	Oraculo	The Crash VIII Aniversario	Four-way match, also involving Black Danger and Dinámico.

The Crash Junior Championship
Incoming champion – Xperia
Date	Winner	Event/Show	Note(s)
May 24	Tiago	The Crash	Three-way match, also involving Torito Negro.
October 10	Vacated	N/A	The Crash announced a match for the vacant championship at The Crash VIII Aniversario.
November 1	Terro Azteca	The Crash VIII Aniversario	Five-way match for the vacant title, also involving Toto, Próximo, Baby Xtreme, and Soldado del Invierno.

The Crash Tag Team Championship
Incoming champions – Vacant
Date	Winner	Event/Show	Note(s)
May 4	Los Lucha Bros (Ray Fenix and Penta 0M)	The Crash	For unexplained reasons, billed as champions again for the May 4 show, negating the previously announced vacancy.
May 24	La Rebelión Amarilla (Bestia 666 and Mecha Wolf)	The Crash	

The Crash Women's Championship
Incoming champion – Tessa Blanchard
Date	Winner	Event/Show	Note(s)
February 9	Vacated	The Crash	The title was vacated as Tessa Blanchard was unable to defend the championship.
February 9	Lady Flamer	The Crash	Four-way match, also involving Christie Jaynes, Miranda Alize, and Reina Isis.

=== WWE ===
– Raw
– SmackDown
– 205 Live
– NXT
– NXT UK
– Unbranded

==== Raw, SmackDown, and 205 Live ====
Raw and SmackDown each had a world championship, a secondary championship, a women's championship, and a male tag team championship, while 205 Live just had one title for their cruiserweight wrestlers.

WWE Universal Championship
Incoming champion – Brock Lesnar
Date	Winner	Event/Show	Note(s)
April 7	Seth Rollins	WrestleMania 35	
July 14	Brock Lesnar	Extreme Rules	Cashed in his Money in the Bank contract.
August 11	Seth Rollins	SummerSlam	
October 31	"The Fiend" Bray Wyatt	Crown Jewel	Falls Count Anywhere match that could not be stopped for any reason.
The title became exclusive to the SmackDown brand due to "The Fiend" Bray Wyatt's status as a SmackDown wrestler.

WWE Championship
Incoming champion – Daniel Bryan
Date	Winner	Event/Show	Note(s)
April 7	Kofi Kingston	WrestleMania 35	First African-born WWE Champion.
October 4	Brock Lesnar	SmackDown's 20th Anniversary	Lesnar's first televised non-pay-per-view match in 15 years.
The title became exclusive to the Raw brand after Brock Lesnar quit SmackDown on November 1 and transferred to Raw.

WWE Intercontinental Championship
Incoming champion – Dean Ambrose
Date	Winner	Event/Show	Note(s)
January 14	Bobby Lashley	Raw	Triple threat match, also involving Seth Rollins.
February 17	Finn Bálor	Elimination Chamber	Handicap match with Lio Rush as Lashley's partner. Bálor pinned Rush to win Lashley's title.
March 11	Bobby Lashley	Raw	
April 7	Finn Bálor	WrestleMania 35	
The title became exclusive to the SmackDown brand following April's Superstar Shake-up when Finn Bálor was drafted to SmackDown.
July 14	Shinsuke Nakamura	Extreme Rules; Kickoff	

WWE United States Championship
Incoming champion – Rusev
Date	Winner	Event/Show	Note(s)
January 27	Shinsuke Nakamura	Royal Rumble	
January 29	R-Truth	SmackDown	
March 5	Samoa Joe	SmackDown	Fatal four-way match, also involving Andrade and Rey Mysterio.
The title became exclusive to the Raw brand following April's Superstar Shake-up when Samoa Joe was drafted to Raw.
May 19	Rey Mysterio	Money in the Bank	
June 3	Samoa Joe	Raw	Rey Mysterio relinquished the title to Joe due to a shoulder injury.
June 23	Ricochet	Stomping Grounds	
July 14	AJ Styles	Extreme Rules	
November 25	Rey Mysterio	Raw	
December 26	Andrade	WWE Live	

WWE Raw Women's Championship
Incoming champion – Ronda Rousey
Date	Winner	Event/Show	Note(s)
April 8	Becky Lynch	WrestleMania 35	Winner takes all triple threat match, also involving Charlotte Flair, who defended the SmackDown Women's Championship. First women's match to main event a WrestleMania. The event was on April 7, but the match went past midnight ET, thus the title change occurred on April 8.

WWE SmackDown Women's Championship
Incoming champion – Asuka
Date	Winner	Event/Show	Note(s)
March 26	Charlotte Flair	SmackDown	
April 8	Becky Lynch	WrestleMania 35	Winner takes all triple threat match, also involving Ronda Rousey, who defended the Raw Women's Championship. First women's match to main event a WrestleMania. The event was on April 7, but the match went past midnight ET, thus the title change occurred on April 8.
May 19	Charlotte Flair	Money in the Bank	
May 19	Bayley	Money in the Bank	Cashed in her Money in the Bank contract.
October 6	Charlotte Flair	Hell in a Cell	
October 11	Bayley	SmackDown	

WWE Raw Tag Team Championship
Incoming champions – Bobby Roode and Chad Gable
Date	Winner	Event/Show	Note(s)
February 11	The Revival (Scott Dawson and Dash Wilder)	Raw	
April 7	Curt Hawkins and Zack Ryder	WrestleMania 35; Kickoff	
June 10	The Revival (Scott Dawson and Dash Wilder)	Raw	Triple threat match, also involving The Usos (Jey Uso and Jimmy Uso).
July 29	Luke Gallows and Karl Anderson	Raw	Triple threat match, also involving The Usos (Jey Uso and Jimmy Uso).
August 19	Seth Rollins and Braun Strowman	Raw	
September 15	Dolph Ziggler and Robert Roode	Clash of Champions	Robert Roode was formerly known as Bobby Roode.
October 14	The Viking Raiders (Erik and Ivar)	Raw	

WWE SmackDown Tag Team Championship
Incoming champions – The Bar (Cesaro and Sheamus)
Date	Winner	Event/Show	Note(s)
January 27	The Miz and Shane McMahon	Royal Rumble	
February 17	The Usos (Jey Uso and Jimmy Uso)	Elimination Chamber	
April 9	The Hardy Boyz (Jeff Hardy and Matt Hardy)	SmackDown	
April 30	Vacated	SmackDown	Title was vacated due to Jeff Hardy suffering a legitimate knee injury that required surgery.
May 7	Daniel Bryan and Rowan	SmackDown	Defeated The Usos (Jey Uso and Jimmy Uso) to win the vacant title.
July 14	The New Day (Big E, Kofi Kingston, and Xavier Woods)	Extreme Rules	Triple threat match, also involving Heavy Machinery (Otis and Tucker); Big E and Woods won the match. At the time, Kingston was the reigning WWE Champion and his status as SmackDown Tag Team Champion was unclear, but after The New Day won their sixth title in April 2020, he was fully credited for this reign under the Freebird Rule.
September 15	The Revival (Scott Dawson and Dash Wilder)	Clash of Champions	Big E and Xavier Woods represented The New Day.
November 8	The New Day (Big E, Kofi Kingston, and Xavier Woods)	SmackDown	Big E and Kingston won the match. At the time, Xavier Woods was inactive due to injury and his status as SmackDown Tag Team Champion was unclear, but after The New Day won their sixth title in April 2020, he was fully credited for this reign under the Freebird Rule.

WWE Cruiserweight Championship
Incoming champion – Buddy Murphy
Date	Winner	Event/Show	Note(s)
April 7	Tony Nese	WrestleMania 35; Kickoff	
June 23	Drew Gulak	Stomping Grounds; Kickoff	Triple threat match, also involving Akira Tozawa, who Gulak pinned.
In October, the title became shared with the NXT brand and was renamed NXT Cruiserweight Championship.
October 9	Lio Rush	NXT	
December 11	Angel Garza	NXT	

==== NXT ====
NXT Championship
Incoming champion – Tommaso Ciampa
Date	Winner	Event/Show	Note(s)
March 13 (aired March 20)	Vacated	NXT	Title was vacated due to Tommaso Ciampa suffering a legitimate neck injury that required surgery.
April 5	Johnny Gargano	TakeOver: New York	Defeated Adam Cole in a two out of three falls match to win the vacant title.
June 1	Adam Cole	TakeOver: XXV	

NXT North American Championship
Incoming champion – Ricochet
Date	Winner	Event/Show	Note(s)
January 26	Johnny Gargano	TakeOver: Phoenix	
January 30 (aired February 20)	Velveteen Dream	NXT	
September 18	Roderick Strong	NXT	

NXT Women's Championship
Incoming champion – Shayna Baszler
Date	Winner	Event/Show	Note(s)
December 18	Rhea Ripley	NXT	

NXT Tag Team Championship
Incoming champions – The Undisputed Era (Kyle O'Reilly and Roderick Strong)
Date	Winner	Event/Show	Note(s)
January 26	War Raiders (Hanson and Rowe)	TakeOver: Phoenix	During their reign, War Raiders' (Hanson and Rowe) team and ring names were renamed to The Viking Experience (Ivar and Erik) when they were drafted to the Raw brand during April's Superstar Shake-up. The week after being drafted, their team name was again changed to The Viking Raiders.
May 1 (aired May 15)	Vacated	NXT	The Viking Raiders (Erik and Ivar), who were drafted to Raw during April's Superstar Shake-up, voluntarily relinquished the title.
June 1	The Street Profits (Angelo Dawkins and Montez Ford)	TakeOver: XXV	Fatal four-way ladder match for the vacant title, also involving Oney Lorcan & Danny Burch, The Undisputed Era (Kyle O'Reilly and Bobby Fish), and The Forgotten Sons (Wesley Blake and Steve Cutler).
August 15 (aired August 28)	The Undisputed Era (Bobby Fish and Kyle O'Reilly)	NXT	

==== NXT UK ====
WWE United Kingdom Championship
Incoming champion – Pete Dunne
Date	Winner	Event/Show	Note(s)
April 5	Walter	TakeOver: New York	

NXT UK Women's Championship
Incoming champion – Rhea Ripley
Date	Winner	Event/Show	Note(s)
January 12	Toni Storm	TakeOver: Blackpool	
August 31	Kay Lee Ray	TakeOver: Cardiff	

NXT UK Tag Team Championship
(Title created)
Date	Winner	Event/Show	Note(s)
January 12	Zack Gibson and James Drake	TakeOver: Blackpool	Defeated Moustache Mountain (Trent Seven and Tyler Bate) in the tournament final to become the inaugural champions.
August 31	Flash Morgan Webster and Mark Andrews	TakeOver: Cardiff	Triple threat match, also involving Gallus (Mark Coffey and Wolfgang).
October 4 (aired October 17)	Gallus (Mark Coffey and Wolfgang)	NXT UK	

==== Unbranded ====
These titles are not brand exclusive. The colors indicate the home brand of the champions (names without a color are former WWE wrestlers, Hall of Famers, or non-wrestlers).

WWE 24/7 Championship
(Title created)
Date	Winner	Event/Show	Note(s)
May 20	Titus O'Neil	Raw	This was a scramble in which the first wrestler to secure the championship laying in the middle of the ring would become the inaugural champion. The scramble also involved EC3, No Way Jose, Cedric Alexander, Eric Young, Luke Gallows, Karl Anderson, and Drake Maverick.
May 20	Robert Roode	Raw	Pinned Titus O'Neil on the entrance ramp.
May 20	R-Truth	Raw	Pinned Robert Roode in the parking lot.
May 28	Elias	SmackDown	Pinned R-Truth in the ring after Truth had interrupted Shane McMahon's "Appreciation Night" and was then ganged up on by Shane, Drew McIntyre, and Elias. The 24/7 rule was then temporarily suspended until after the tag team match later that same night, in which both Elias and Truth were involved.
May 28	R-Truth	SmackDown	Pinned Elias in the ring after Elias was speared by Roman Reigns and the 24/7 rule's temporary suspension was lifted.
June 2	Jinder Mahal	N/A	Pinned R-Truth on an unidentified golf course during a golfing session. Shown on WWE's website and social media accounts.
June 2	R-Truth	N/A	Pinned Jinder Mahal on an unidentified golf course during a golfing session. Shown on WWE's website and social media accounts.
June 4	Elias	SmackDown	Lumberjack match where the 24/7 rule was suspended during the match.
June 4	R-Truth	SmackDown	Pinned Elias under the ring.
June 6	Jinder Mahal	N/A	Pinned R-Truth at the Frankfurt Airport in Frankfurt, Germany during a stopover en route to Saudi Arabia for Super ShowDown. Shown on WWE's website and social media accounts.
June 6	R-Truth	N/A	Pinned Jinder Mahal while he was sleeping on an airplane 39,000 feet above the Red Sea during a flight to Saudi Arabia for Super ShowDown. Shown on WWE's website and social media accounts.
June 18	Drake Maverick	SmackDown	Pinned R-Truth in the parking lot while disguised as Truth's friend Carmella while Truth was trying to leave the arena.
June 20	R-Truth	Drake Maverick's wedding	Pinned Drake Maverick in the aisle while Maverick and his wife Renee Michelle were making their exit. Shown on WWE's website and social media accounts on June 21.
June 24	Heath Slater	Raw	Prior to the scheduled match between Slater and Mojo Rawley, R-Truth ran out from the crowd, being chased by several other wrestlers. A brawl broke out and Slater pinned the distracted Truth in the ring.
June 24	R-Truth	Raw	Pinned Heath Slater in the ring as Slater was trying to escape from the other wrestlers.
June 24	Cedric Alexander	Raw	Pinned R-Truth in the ring.
June 24	EC3	Raw	Pinned Cedric Alexander at ringside as Alexander was trying to escape from the other wrestlers.
June 24	R-Truth	Raw	Pinned EC3 on the entrance ramp after EC3 was distracted by Carmella.
July 1	Drake Maverick	Raw	Pinned R-Truth backstage after throwing his suitcase at Truth, who was trying to avoid a mob of wrestlers.
July 15	R-Truth	Raw	Pinned Drake Maverick on the hotel bed of Maverick's "honeymoon suite". Truth hid under a dining cart while a referee was disguised as a hotel worker to gain access to Maverick's room.
July 22	Drake Maverick	Raw Reunion	Pinned R-Truth backstage after Truth was distracted by Maverick's wife, Renee Michelle.
July 22	Pat Patterson	Raw Reunion	Pinned Drake Maverick backstage after kicking him on the floor after Maverick tripped and hurt himself trying to escape The Boogeyman. First WWE Hall of Famer and non-active wrestler to win the title, and subsequently the oldest champion in WWE history at 78 years old.
July 22	Gerald Brisco	Raw Reunion	Pinned Pat Patterson off-screen backstage.
July 22	Kelly Kelly	Raw Reunion	Pinned Gerald Brisco backstage after kneeing him in the groin. First woman to win the title.
July 22	Candice Michelle	Raw Reunion	Pinned Kelly Kelly after attacking her backstage. Melina was the special guest referee.
July 22	Alundra Blayze	Raw Reunion	Submitted Candice Michelle backstage with a sleeper hold. Melina was the special guest referee.
July 22	The Million Dollar Man	Raw Reunion	Bought the title from Alundra Blayze, who was about to throw the title in a trash can at the commentary table.
July 22	Drake Maverick	Raw Reunion	Pinned The Million Dollar Man in a limousine backstage after attacking him in the limo.
July 22	R-Truth	Raw Reunion	Pinned Drake Maverick backstage as Maverick was trying to leave the building in a limousine.
July 29	Mike Kanellis	Raw	Pinned R-Truth in a dogpile after a Mosh Pit mixed tag team match featuring Truth and Carmella against Drake Maverick and his wife, Renee Michelle, during which the 24/7 rule was suspended.
July 29	Maria Kanellis	Raw	Maria forced her husband Mike Kanellis to lay down and be pinned by her in their locker room.
August 5	Mike Kanellis	N/A	Pinned his wife Maria Kanellis with a hug while she was laying down on the examination table during her OB-GYN appointment where the referee was disguised as a nurse. Occurred during the afternoon and shown on that night's episode of Raw.
August 5	R-Truth	N/A	Pinned Mike Kanellis in the OB-GYN's waiting room while disguised as a pregnant woman. Occurred during the afternoon and shown on that night's episode of Raw.
August 12	The Revival (Scott Dawson and Dash Wilder)	Raw	During a scheduled tag team match in which The Revival were facing Lucha House Party (Lince Dorado and Gran Metalik, with Kalisto), R-Truth ran out from backstage, being chased by several wrestlers. The match was called off and The Revival performed a "Hart Attack" on Truth and simultaneously pinned him to become the first co-24/7 Champions.
August 12	R-Truth	Raw	After Kalisto performed a "Salida del Sol" on Scott Dawson, Carmella pulled Truth on top of Dawson to get the pin.
August 12	Elias	Raw	Pinned R-Truth backstage after hitting him with his guitar.
August 23	R-Truth	Fox Sports Founders Day	Pinned Elias following the latter's musical performance and a distraction by Drake Maverick. Shown on WWE's website and social media accounts on August 24.
August 23	Rob Stone	Fox College Football	Pinned R-Truth on the show's set. Shown on WWE's website and social media accounts on August 24. First non-wrestler to win the title.
August 23	Elias	Fox College Football	Pinned Rob Stone on the show's set. Shown on WWE's website and social media accounts on August 24.
August 27	Drake Maverick	SmackDown	Pinned Elias after Elias was hit with a stunner by Kevin Owens and after Maverick stopped R-Truth from pinning Elias.
September 3	Bo Dallas	SmackDown	Pinned Drake Maverick backstage following several attempts by other wrestlers.
September 3	Drake Maverick	SmackDown	After being chased to the ring, Maverick pinned Bo Dallas after a skirmish with some other wrestlers in the ring.
September 3	R-Truth	SmackDown	Hidden among the King of the Ring props on the entrance stage, Truth snuck up behind Drake Maverick and pinned him on the entrance ramp.
September 9	Enes Kanter	Raw	Occurred prior to the live taping of Raw, but shown on that night's episode. Attacked and pinned R-Truth during an in-ring segment. Second non-wrestler to win the title.
September 9	R-Truth	Raw	Occurred prior to the live taping of Raw, but shown on that night's episode. Pinned NBA player Enes Kanter in the ring.
September 16	Mayor Glenn Jacobs	N/A	Pinned R-Truth under the goal post of Neyland Stadium during a tour of Knoxville where the referee was disguised as a police officer. Jacobs is better known by his ring name Kane; this was the first title won under his real name. Occurred during the afternoon and shown on that night's episode of Raw.
September 16	R-Truth	N/A	Pinned Mayor Glenn Jacobs in the valet parking area just after Jacobs arrived at the Thompson-Boling Arena for that night's episode of Raw. Occurred just prior to Raw going live on the air and shown later that night.
September 20	EC3	WWE Live	Pinned R-Truth in the ring.
September 20	R-Truth	WWE Live	Pinned EC3 in the ring.
September 21	EC3	WWE Live	Pinned R-Truth in the ring.
September 21	R-Truth	WWE Live	Pinned EC3 in the ring. Chad Gable was the special guest referee.
September 22	EC3	WWE Live	Pinned R-Truth in the ring.
September 22	R-Truth	WWE Live	Pinned EC3 in the ring. Chad Gable was the special guest referee.
September 23	Carmella	Raw	Pinned R-Truth in the ring.
October 4	Marshmello	SmackDown's 20th Anniversary	Tripped and fell on top of Carmella backstage. Third non-wrestler to win the title.
October 4	Carmella	SmackDown's 20th Anniversary	Pinned disc jockey Marshmello in the parking lot. Shown on WWE's website and social media accounts.
October 6	Tamina	Hell in a Cell	Pinned Carmella backstage.
October 6	R-Truth	Hell in a Cell	Pinned Tamina by the international commentary tables. Truth won the title as a member of the SmackDown brand, but was drafted to Raw during the Draft in October.
October 21	Sunil Singh	Raw	Pinned R-Truth backstage.
October 31	R-Truth	Crown Jewel; Kickoff	Pinned Sunil Singh on the entrance ramp after both Truth and Sunil were eliminated from a battle royal where the 24/7 rule was suspended.
October 31	Samir Singh	Crown Jewel	Pinned R-Truth backstage.
November 18	R-Truth	Raw	Pinned Samir Singh backstage in the medical examination room where Truth was disguised as a doctor. Shown on WWE's website and social media accounts.
November 19	Michael Giacco	N/A	Pinned R-Truth during a WWE Employee Town Hall Event at WWE Headquarters. Giacco is WWE's Senior Account Manager. Shown on WWE's website and social media accounts. Fourth non-wrestler to win the title.
November 19	R-Truth	N/A	Pinned Michael Giacco during Giacco's contract signing at a Talent Relations meeting at WWE Headquarters. Shown on WWE's website and social media accounts.
December 2	Kyle Busch	Raw	Pinned R-Truth at ringside with Michael Waltrip as the special guest referee. Busch is a NASCAR driver. Fifth non-wrestler to win the title.
December 2	R-Truth	Raw	Pinned NASCAR driver Kyle Busch backstage. Shown on WWE's website and social media accounts.
December 22	Akira Tozawa	N/A	Pinned R-Truth at the Rockefeller Center during a sightseeing trip of New York City. Shown on the December 23 episode of Raw.
December 22	Santa Claus	N/A	Pinned Akira Tozawa at Columbus Circle during a sightseeing trip of New York City. Shown on the December 23 episode of Raw. Santa Claus was played by independent wrestler Bear Bronson.
December 22	R-Truth	N/A	Pinned Santa Claus at the Lincoln Center during a sightseeing trip of New York City. Shown on the December 23 episode of Raw.
December 26	Sunil Singh	WWE Live	Pinned R-Truth in the ring.
December 26	R-Truth	WWE Live	Pinned Sunil Singh in the ring.
December 27	Samir Singh	WWE Live	Handicap match, also involving Sunil Singh.
December 27	Mike Rome	WWE Live	Pinned Samir Singh in the ring. Rome is the ring announcer for Raw. Sixth non-wrestler to win the title.
December 27	Sunil Singh	WWE Live	Pinned Mike Rome in the ring.
December 27	R-Truth	WWE Live	Pinned Sunil Singh in the ring.
December 28	Samir Singh	WWE Live	Handicap match, also involving Sunil Singh.
December 28	R-Truth	WWE Live	Pinned Samir Singh in the ring.
December 29	Samir Singh	WWE Live	Handicap match, also involving Sunil Singh.
December 29	Sunil Singh	WWE Live	Pinned Samir Singh in the ring.
December 29	R-Truth	WWE Live	Pinned Sunil Singh in the ring.
December 31	Mojo Rawley	Fox's New Year's Eve with Steve Harvey	Pinned R-Truth during the broadcast in Times Square. Co-host Maria Menounos was the special guest referee.
December 31	R-Truth	Fox's New Year's Eve with Steve Harvey	Shortly after Mojo Rawley won the championship, Elias smashed a guitar against him, allowing Truth to win back the title. Co-host Maria Menounos was the special guest referee.

WWE Women's Tag Team Championship
(Title created)
Date	Winner	Event/Show	Note(s)
February 17	The Boss 'n' Hug Connection (Bayley and Sasha Banks)	Elimination Chamber	Tag team Elimination Chamber match to determine the inaugural champions, also involving Nia Jax & Tamina and The Riott Squad's Liv Morgan and Sarah Logan from Raw and Mandy Rose & Sonya Deville, The IIconics (Billie Kay and Peyton Royce), and Naomi & Carmella from SmackDown. The Boss 'n' Hug Connection lastly eliminated Rose & Deville, by way of Banks submitting Rose, to win the championship.
April 7	The IIconics (Billie Kay and Peyton Royce)	WrestleMania 35	Fatal four-way tag team match, also involving Nia Jax & Tamina and Beth Phoenix & Natalya, both of which were from Raw. Kay pinned Bayley to win the championship.
August 5	Alexa Bliss and Nikki Cross	Raw	Fatal four-way tag team elimination match, also involving Mandy Rose & Sonya Deville and The Kabuki Warriors (Asuka and Kairi Sane), both of which were from SmackDown. Bliss & Cross lastly eliminated The Kabuki Warriors, by way of Bliss pinning Sane, to win the championship.
October 6	The Kabuki Warriors (Asuka and Kairi Sane)	Hell in a Cell	The Kabuki Warriors won the title as members of the SmackDown brand, but were drafted to Raw during the Draft in October.

== Awards and honors ==
=== AAA ===
==== AAA Hall of Fame ====
Year	Ring name (Birth name)	AAA recognized accolades
2019	Silver King (César Cuauhtémoc González Barrón)	Posthumous Inductee: one-time AAA World Tag Team Champion

=== WWE ===
==== WWE Hall of Fame ====
Category	Inductee
Individual	The Honky Tonk Man
Individual	Torrie Wilson
Group	D-Generation X (Triple H, Shawn Michaels, Chyna, Road Dogg, Billy Gunn and X-Pac)
Group	Harlem Heat (Booker T and Stevie Ray)
Group	The Hart Foundation (Bret Hart and Jim Neidhart)
Warrior Award	Sue Aitchison

== Debuts ==
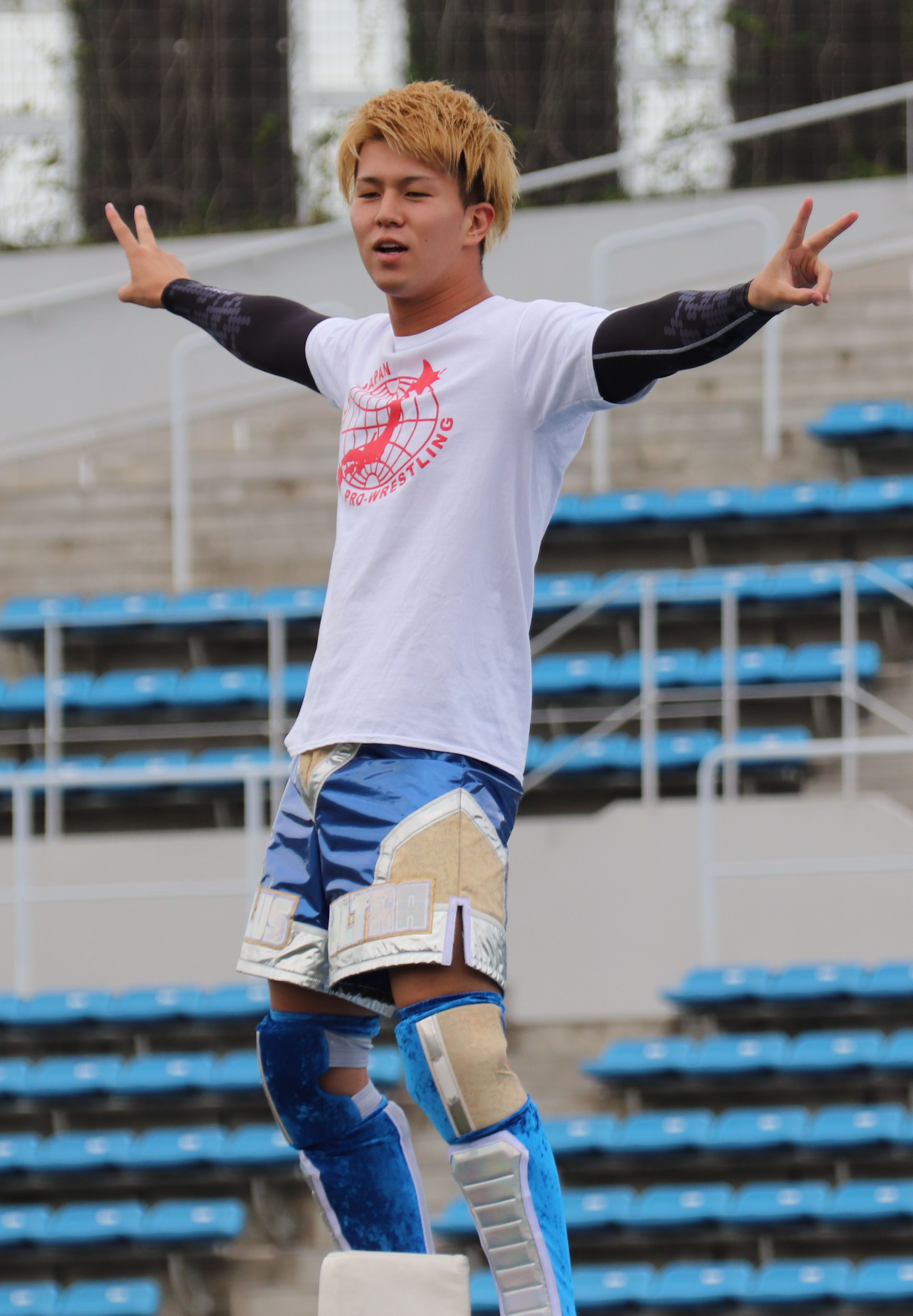
Atsuki Aoyagi

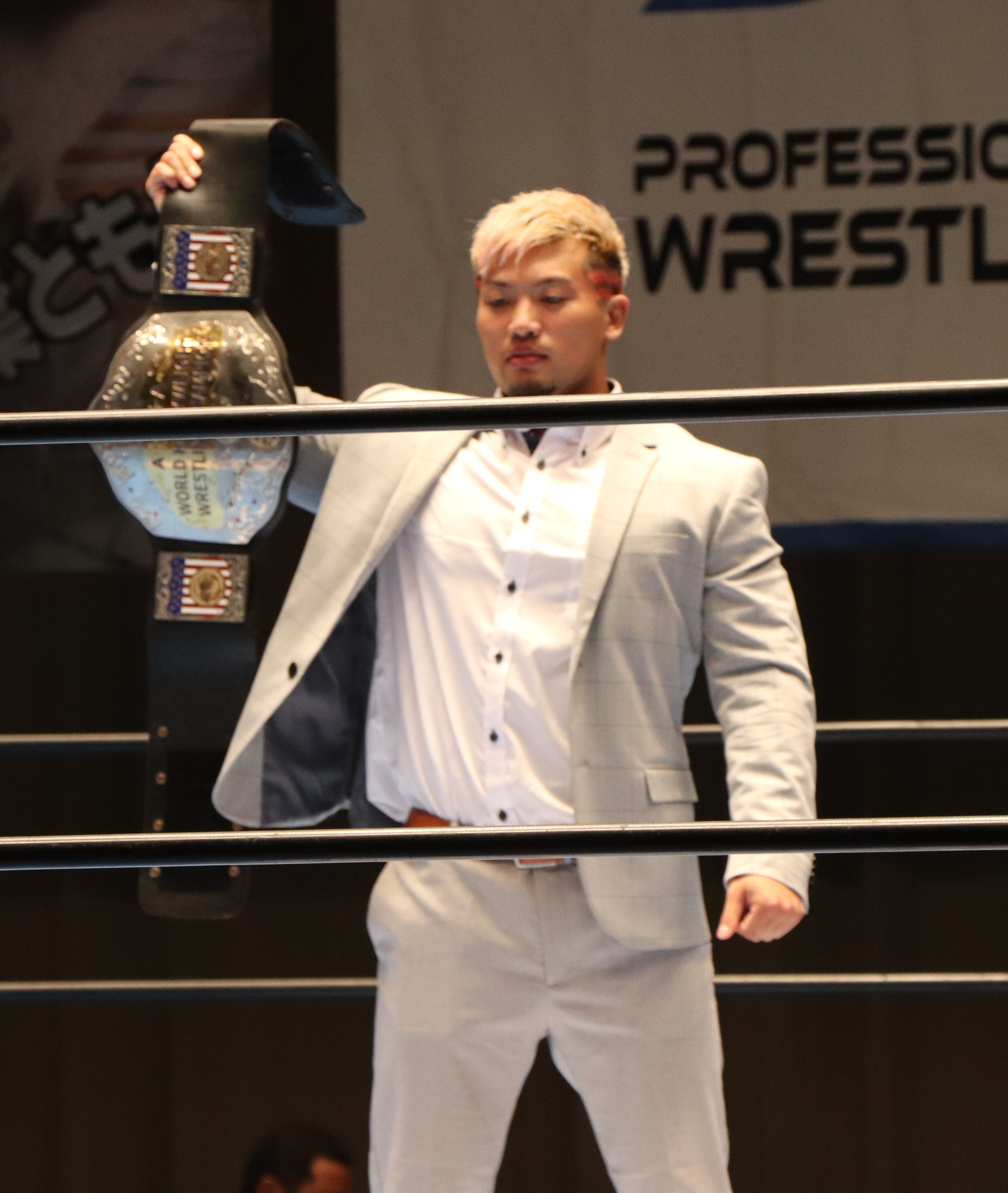
Hayato Tamura

- January 2
  - Atsuki Aoyagi
  - Dan Tamura
- January 4 – Unagi Sayaka
- February 8 – Kosuke Sato
- February 23 – Mahiro Kiryu
- February 28 – Heidi Howitzer
- March 10 – Haruka Umesaki
- March 17 - Miranda Gordy
- March 30 – Issei Onitsuka
- April 10 – Strong Machine J
- April 16 – Jacky Kamei
- April 21 – Akari
- April 30 – Momo Kohgo
- May 2 – Yappy
- May 3 – Mirai
- May 4 – Jack Cartwheel
- May 7
  - Maika
  - Ryuya Takekura
- May 12 – Madeline
- May 26 – Ricky Smokes
- July 7 – Crea
- July 8
  - Kanon
  - Tomoka Inaba
- August 3 – Cain Velasquez
- August 9 – Erina Yamanaka
- August 10 – Saya Kamitani
- August 12 – Suzume
- August 14 – Nao Ishikawa
- August 17 – Yuki Mashiro
- August 31 – Teal Piper
- September 24 – Hayato Tamura
- September 28
  - Leon Slater
  - Takuro Niki
  - Yurika Oka
- October 6 – Nanami
- October 18 – Keigo Nakamura
- November 2 – Action Andretti
- November 6 – Yoshiko Hasegawa
- November 7 – Odyssey Jones
- November 10
  - Daiju Wakamatsu
  - Naka Shuma
- December 22 – SB Kento

== Retirements ==
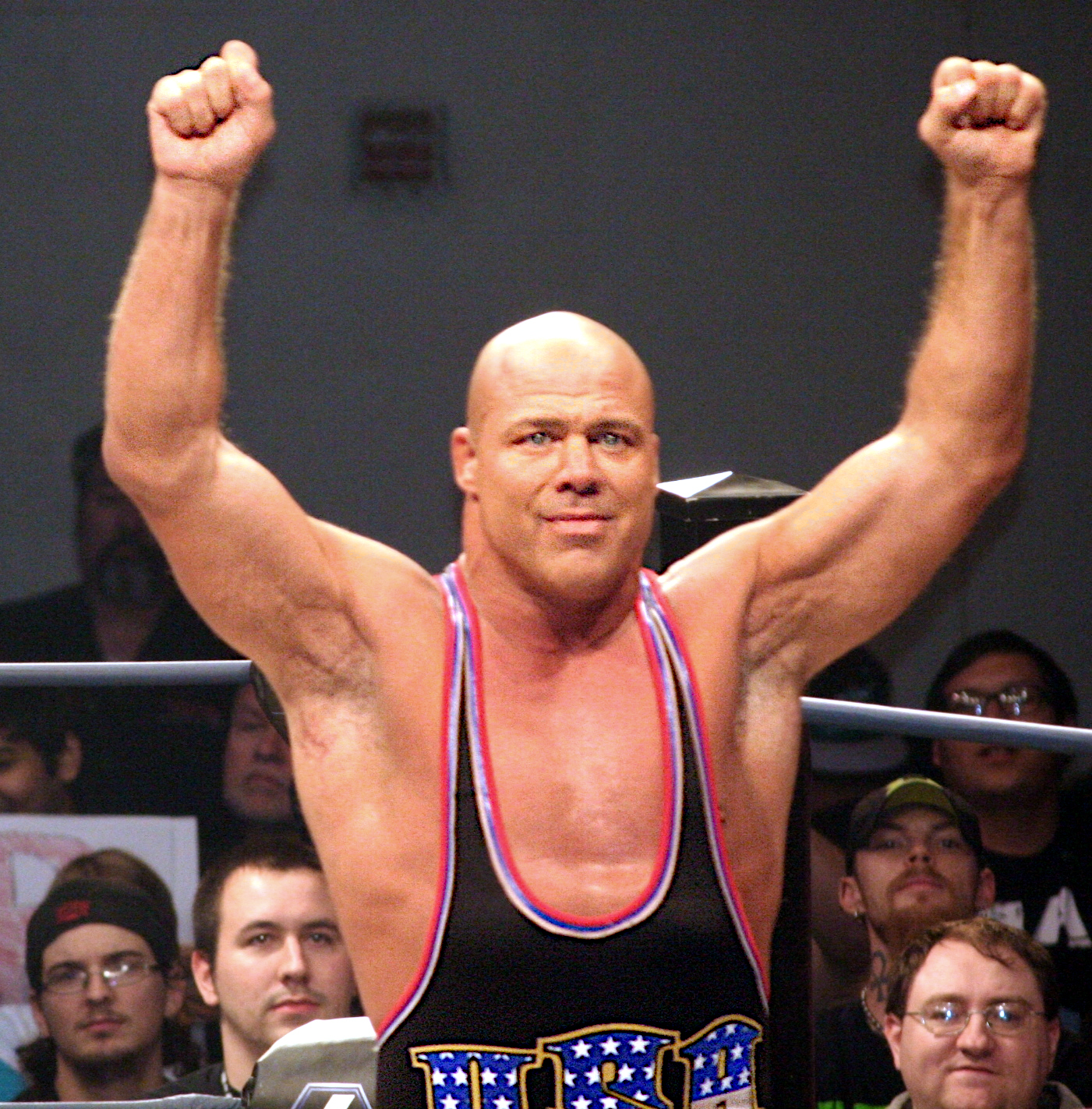
Kurt Angle

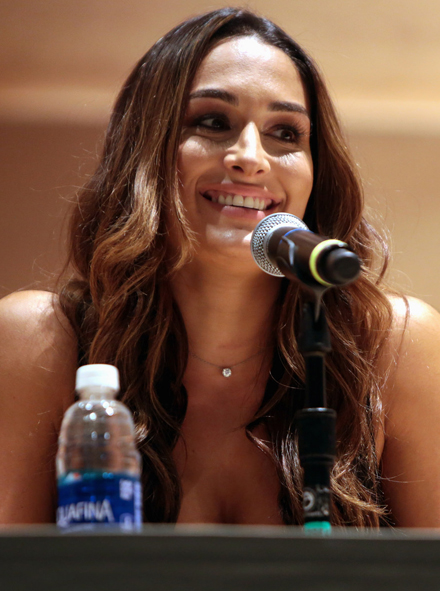
Nikki Bella

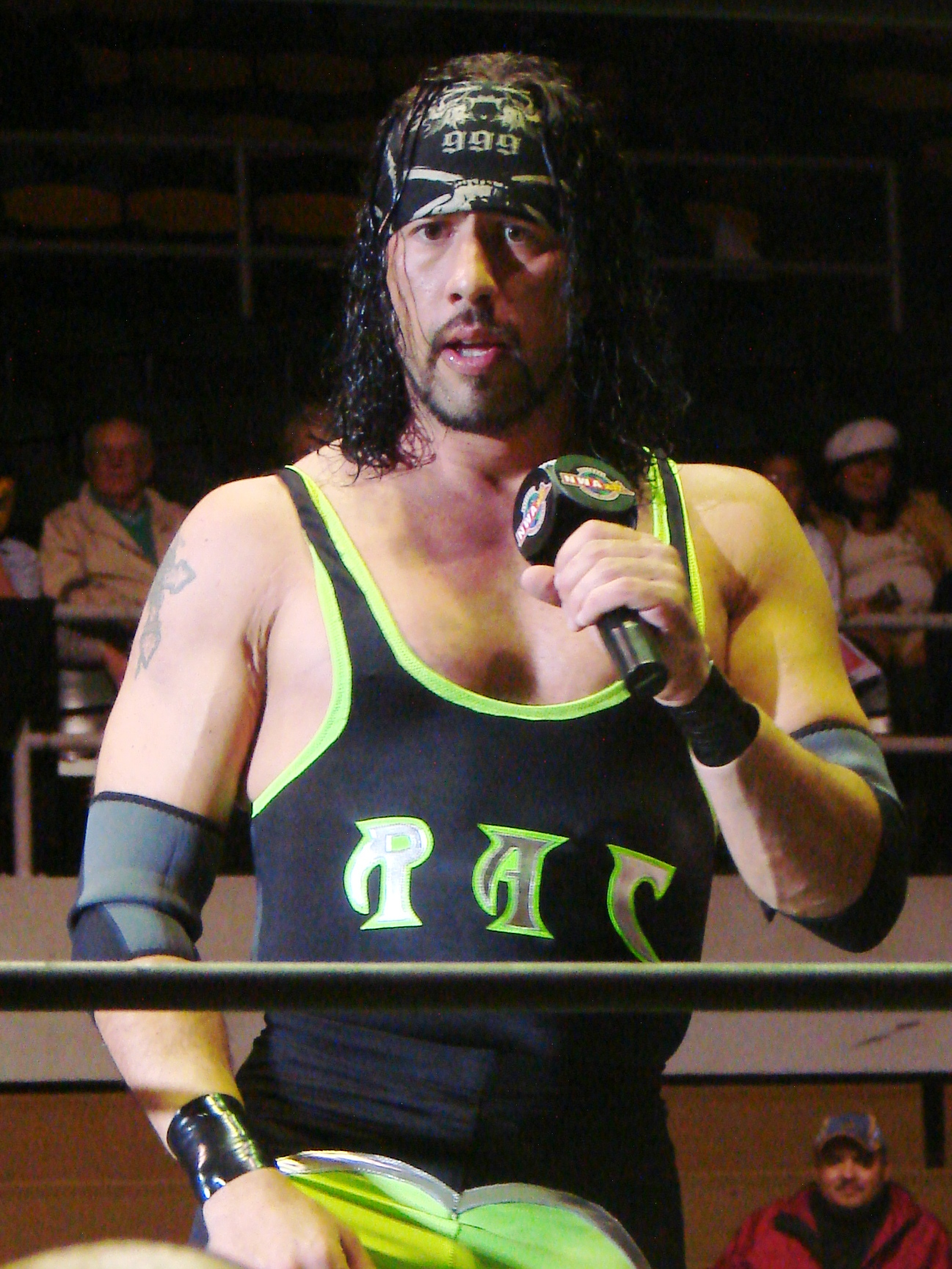
X-Pac

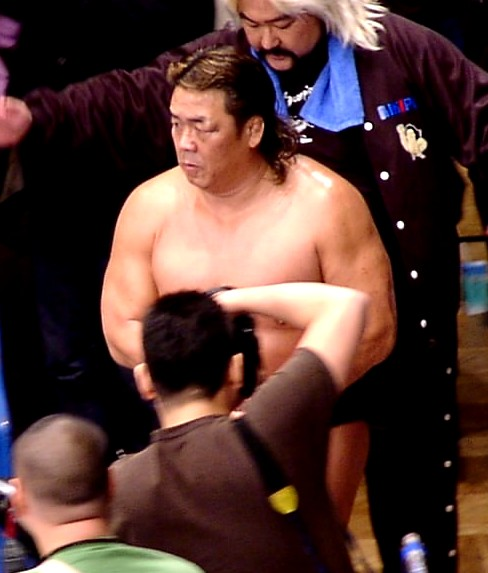
Riki Choshu

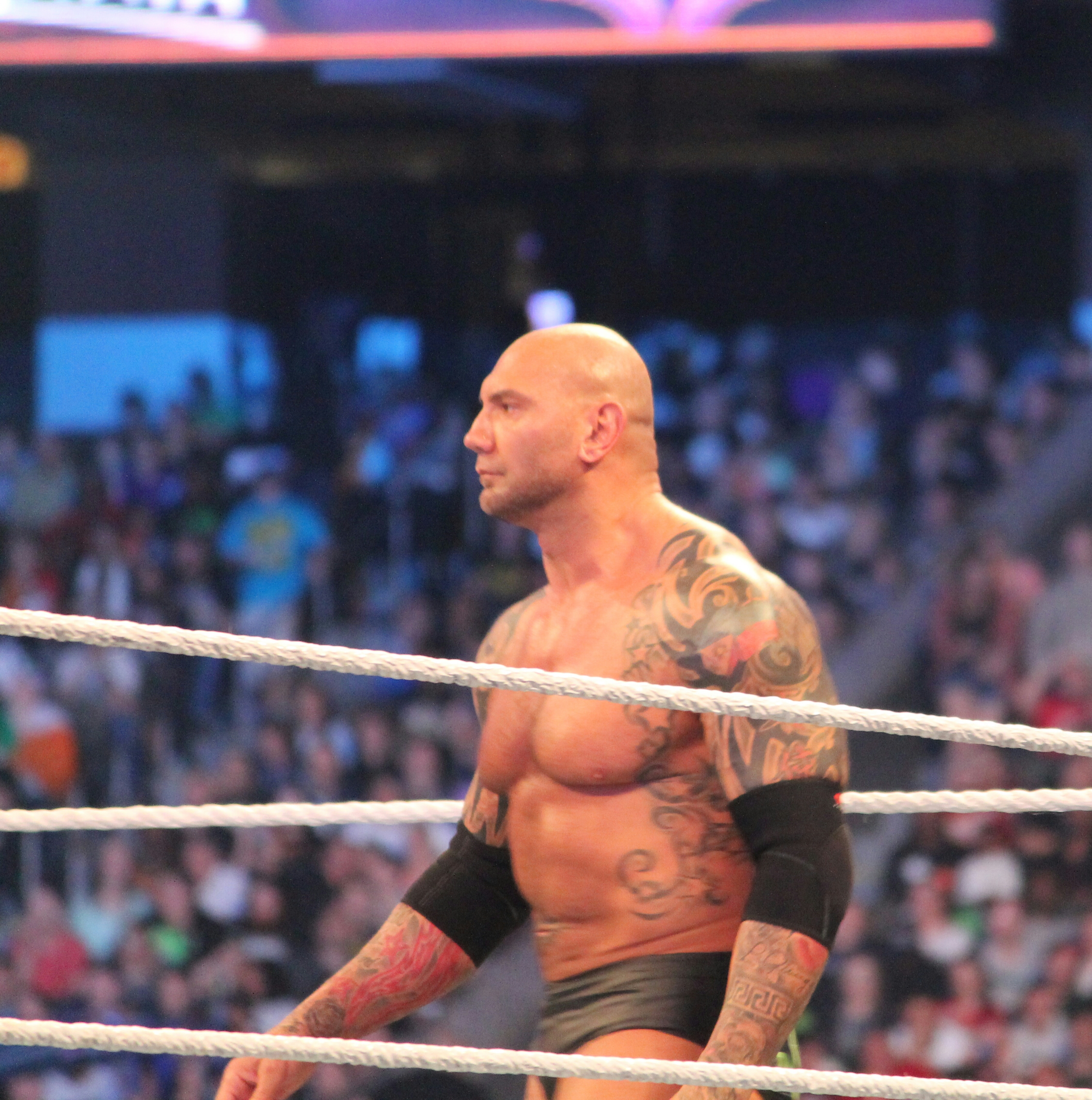
Batista

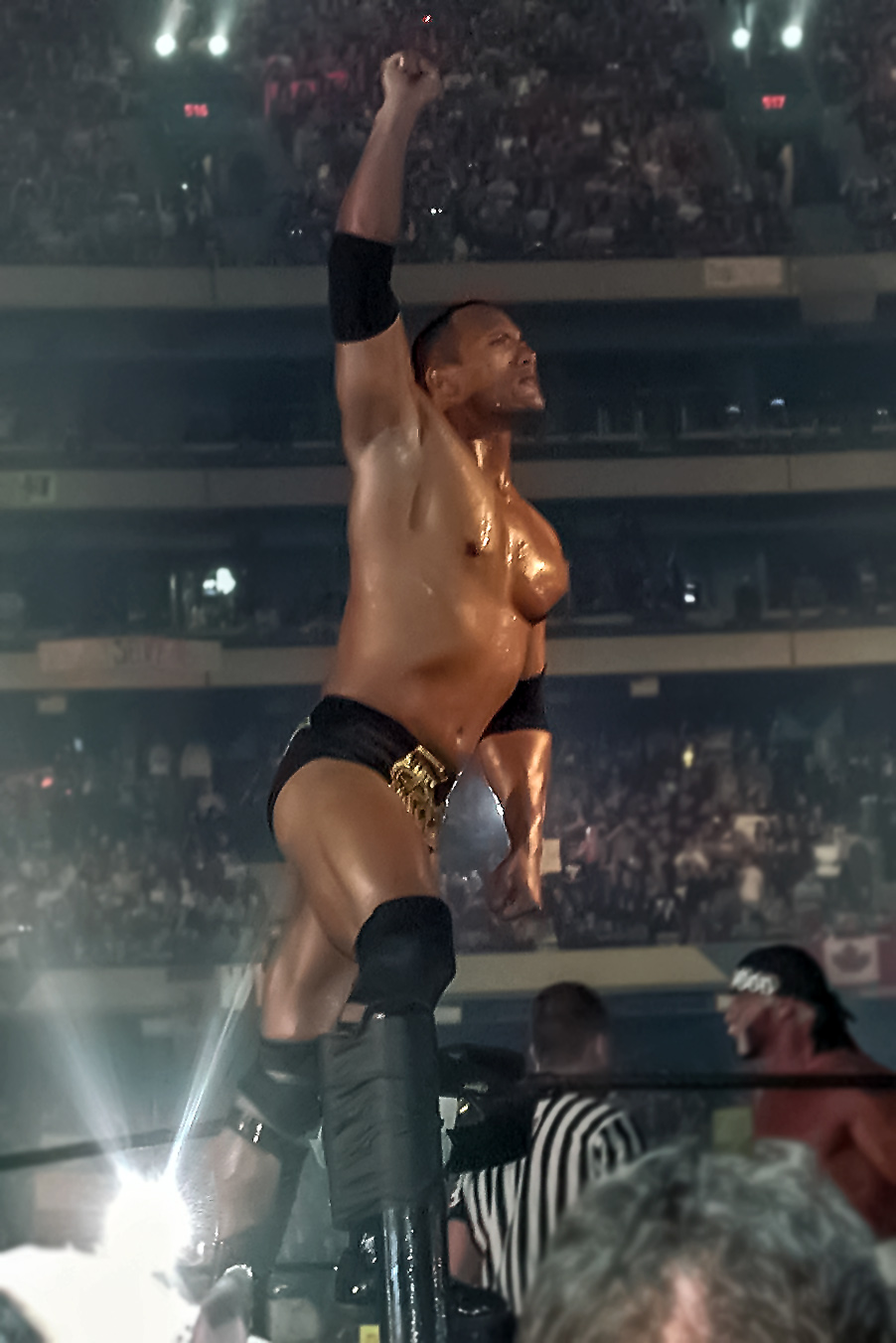
The Rock

- January 30 - Abyss (wrestler) (1995-2019)
- February 21 – Takashi Iizuka (1986–2019)
- March 9 – Mil Máscaras (1963–2019)
- March 11 – Brie Bella (September 15, 2007 – 2019)
- March 19 – Matt Morgan (2002–March 19, 2019)
- March 24 – Nikki Bella (September 15, 2007 – 2019)
- April 6 – George Julio (1965–2019)
- April 7
  - Kurt Angle (1998–2019)
  - Batista (1999–2019)
- April 21 – Command Bolshoi (1991–2019)
- April 26 – Kris Wolf (2014–2019)
- April 28 – Sawako Shimono (2010–2019)
- April 29 - Rock Riddle (1972-2019)
- May 11
  - Bob Armstrong (1961–2019)
  - Wendell Cooley (1981–2019)
- May 31 – Metálico
- June 26 – Riki Choshu (1974–June 26, 2019)
- June 30 – Charlie Morgan (2011–2019)
- July – X-Pac (1989–July 2019, came out of retirement in 2022)
- July 5 – Claude Roca (circa 1960s–July 5, 2019)
- July 22 – Barbi Hayden (2010–2019)
- August 3 – The Rock (1996–2004, 2012-2019)
- August 10 – Koko B. Ware (1978–2019)
- August 17 – Sergio El Hermoso (1960s–2019)
- August 18 – Tinieblas (August 20, 1971 – 2019)
- September 15 – Jaque Mate (wrestler) (September 15, 1971 – 2019)
- September 19 – Kim Duk (1968–2019, returned in 2022)
- September 21 – Lisa Marie Varon (2000–2019)
- December 14 – Bill Dundee (1962–2019)

== Deaths ==
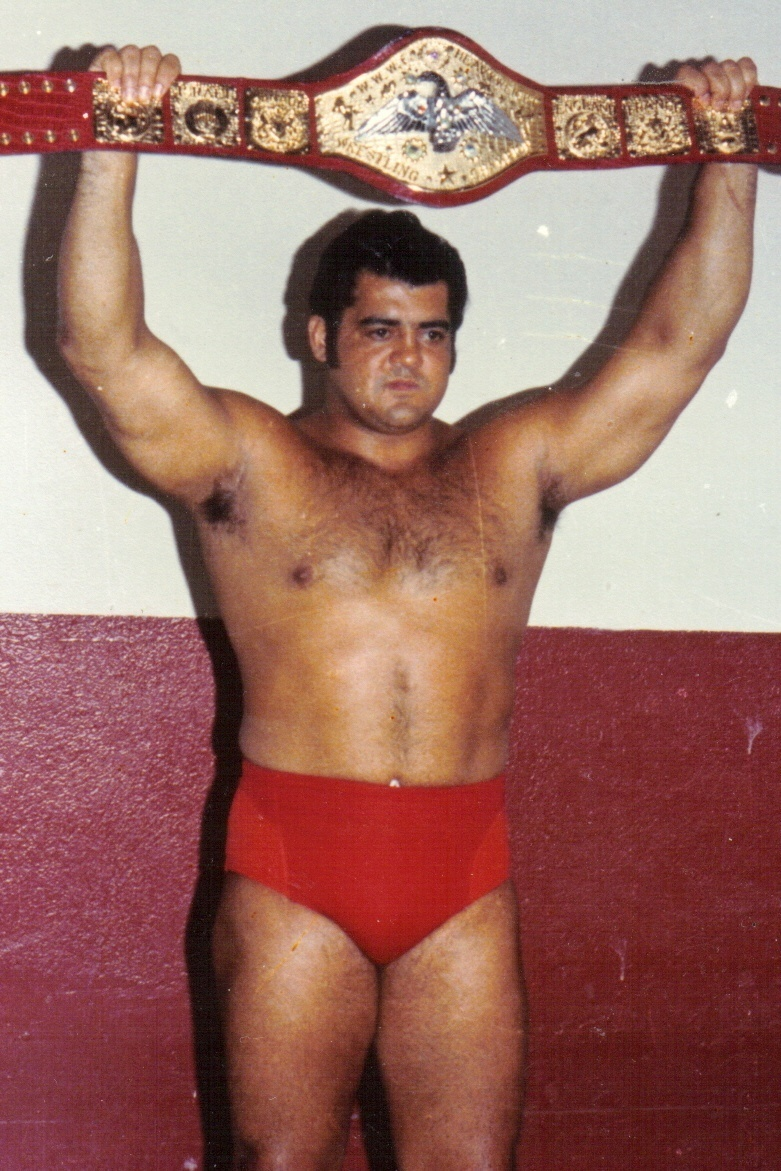
Pedro Morales

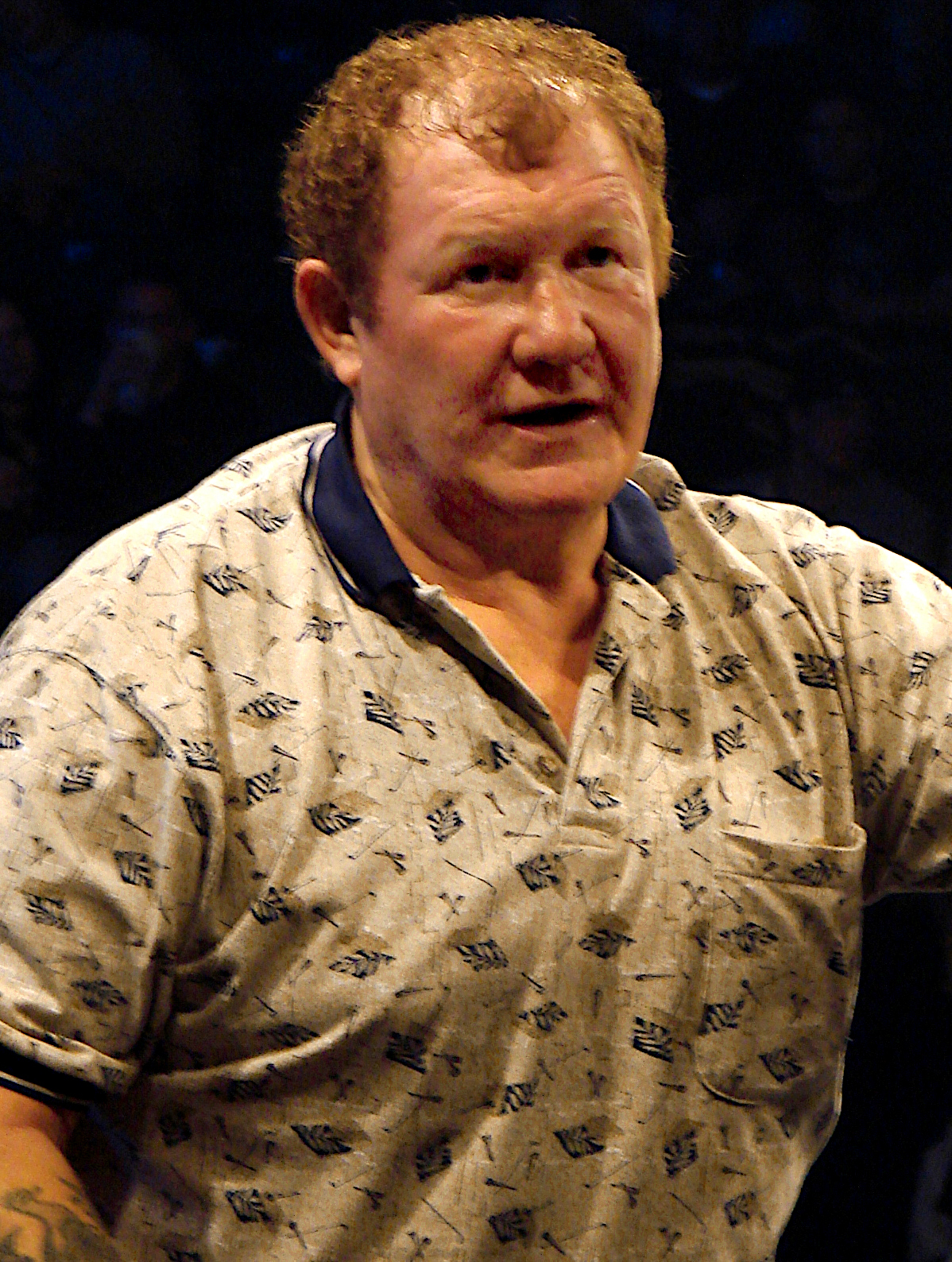
Harley Race

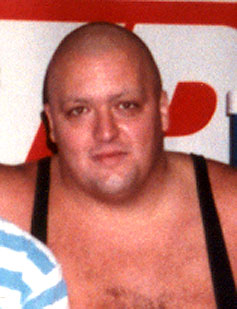
King Kong Bundy

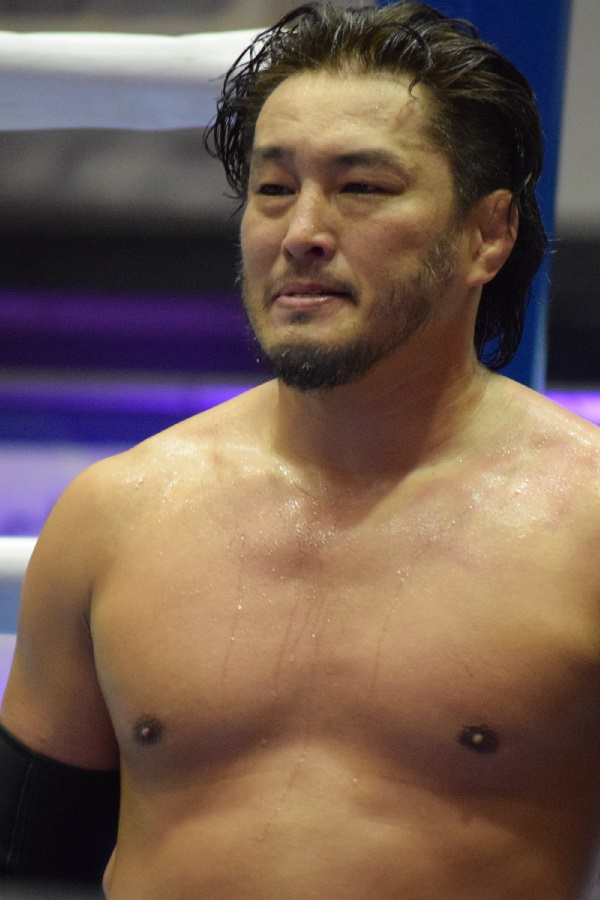
Atsushi Aoki

- January 2 – "Mean" Gene Okerlund (b. 1942)
- January 5 – Alexis Smirnoff (b. 1947)
- January 22 – Belladonna (b.1979)
- February 1 – Les Thornton (b. 1934)
- February 10 – Kōji Kitao (b. 1963)
- February 9 – Salvatore Bellomo (b. 1951)
- February 12 – Pedro Morales (b. 1942),
- March 4 – King Kong Bundy (b. 1957),
- March 7 – The Destroyer (b. 1930),
- March 18 – Roger Kirby (b. 1939),
- April 8 – Héctor del Mar (b. 1942),
- April 22 – John Quinn, (b. 1940),
- May 11 – Silver King, (b. 1968),
- May 16 – Ashley Massaro, (b. 1979),
- June 3 – Atsushi Aoki, (b. 1977),
- June 8 – Willie Williams (b. 1951)
- June 19 – Lionheart, (b. 1982),
- July 2 – Jacques Rougeau Sr., (b. 1930),
- July 3 – Perro Aguayo, (b. 1946)
- July 6 – Paco Alonso, (b. 1952)
- August 1 – Harley Race, (b. 1943)
- August 14 – Gerry Hoggarth, (b. 1922)
- August 15
  - Wrestling Pro, (b. 1938)
  - Eddie Marlin, (b. 1930)
- August 22 – Norman Frederick Charles III (b. 1941)
- August 26 – Dr. Karonte, (b. 1957)
- September 20 – Rick Bognar, (b. 1970)
- December 14 – Moondog Rex, (b. 1950)
- December 23 – Mr. Niebla, (b. 1973)
- December 28 – Izzy Slapawitz, (b. 1948)

== See also ==
- List of WWE pay-per-view and WWE Network events
- List of AEW pay-per-view events
- List of NWA pay-per-view events
- List of NJPW pay-per-view events
- List of ROH pay-per-view events
- List of Impact Wrestling pay-per-view events
- List of MLW events
