= Costilla =

Costilla may refer to:

- Costilla County, Colorado
- Costilla, New Mexico, a census-designated place in Taos County
- Costilla Creek, in Colorado and New Mexico
- Fernando Costilla (born 1972), Spanish television personality and voice actor
