= Summer Supercard =

2019 Ring of Honor, New Japan Pro-Wrestling and Consejo Mundial de Lucha Libre event

- Promotional poster
- Promotion(s): Ring of Honor; New Japan Pro-Wrestling; Consejo Mundial de Lucha Libre; National Wrestling Alliance
- Date: August 9, 2019
- City: Toronto, Ontario, Canada
- Venue: Mattamy Athletic Centre
- Attendance: 650

Event chronology
← Previous (ROH) Mass Hysteria (NJPW) G1 Climax 29 (CMLL) Liger: El Adiós de México en la Arena México	Next → (ROH) Saturday Night At Center Stage (NJPW) G1 Climax 29 (CMLL) International Gran Prix

Summer Supercard was a multi-promotional professional wrestling pay-per-view supershow produced by Ring of Honor (ROH) also featuring wrestlers from Mexico's Consejo Mundial de Lucha Libre (CMLL), the National Wrestling Alliance (NWA), and Japan's New Japan Pro-Wrestling (NJPW) promotions and took place on August 9, 2019, at the Mattamy Athletic Centre in Toronto, Ontario, Canada. The event streamed live on Honor Club and FITE TV.

== Background ==
Other on-screen personnel
Role:	Name:
Commentators	Ian Riccaboni (Pre-show+Main Show)
Commentators	Caprice Coleman (Pre-show+Main Show)
Commentators	Rocky Romero (Main Show)
Ring announcer	Bobby Cruise
Referees	Joe Mandak
Referees	Todd Sinclair
Interviewer	Quinn McKay

=== Production ===
When the event was first announced, the National Wrestling Alliance (NWA) was also part of the event's co-production. Therefore, there was a NWA-sanctioned match scheduled to be on the card: Nick Aldis defending his NWA Worlds Heavyweight Championship against a Villain Enterprises member of Marty Scurll's choosing. However, on July 24, ROH and NWA ended their relationship agreement and the match was officially canceled.

=== Storylines ===
Summer Supercard featured professional wrestling matches, involving different wrestlers from pre-existing scripted feuds, plots, and storylines that played out on ROH's television programs. Wrestlers portrayed villains or heroes as they follow a series of events that build tension and culminate in a wrestling match or series of matches.

== Results ==
No.	Results	Stipulations	Times
1	Villain Enterprises (PCO and Brody King) defeated The Kingdom (T. K. O'Ryan and Vinny Marseglia)	Tag team match	12:22
2	Marty Scurll defeated P. J. Black	Singles match	15:16
3	Kelly Klein (c) defeated Tasha Steelz	Singles match for the Women of Honor World Championship	13:10
4	LifeBlood (Bandido and Mark Haskins) defeated Jay Lethal and Jonathan Gresham by submission	Tag team match	10:42
5	Rush defeated Dalton Castle	No Disqualification match	19:55
6	Shane Taylor (c) defeated Tracy Williams	Singles match for the ROH World Television Championship	11:14
7	Carístico, Soberano Jr. and Stuka Jr. defeated Bárbaro Cavernario, Hechicero and Templario by submission	Trios match	16:42
8	Matt Taven (c) defeated Alex Shelley	Singles match for the ROH World Championship	14:32
9	The Briscoe Brothers (Jay Briscoe and Mark Briscoe) (c) defeated Guerrillas of Destiny (Tama Tonga and Tanga Loa)	Ladder War X for the ROH World Tag Team Championship	22:45
(c) / – the champion(s) heading into the match

== Reception ==
Stuart Carapola of Pro Wrestling Insider praised the majority of the matches, overall calling the show "terrific". Justin Knipper of Wrestling Observer Newsletter stated "this was a decent show, but the standout match featured six guys who aren’t even under contract to ROH." He went on to say that card "often felt flat, probably because of the stuffy booking, stale wrestling and a modest crowd." The bleachers in the arena were also described as "empty".

== See also ==
- 2019 in professional wrestling
- Professional wrestling in Canada
