= Héctor del Mar =

Spanish television presenter (1942–2019)

- Born: 22 November 1942; Mar del Plata, Argentina
- Died: 8 April 2019 (aged 76); Madrid, Spain

Héctor del Mar (22 November 1942 – 8 April 2019) was a Spanish presenter of radio and television of Argentine origin. He was famous for his career narrating the programs of WWE in Spain from 1990 to 2019, first next to José Luis Ibáñez and then Fernando Costilla.

== Biography ==
Del Mar was vice-president of Academia Española de la Radio, and also acted as a speaker in the Madrid-based Radio Libertad. Throughout his career, he received awards such as the Ondas, Iberoamericano, Pueblo Popular, Antena de Oro and Microphone of Gold awards.
