= World Radio Day =

International celebration on 13 February

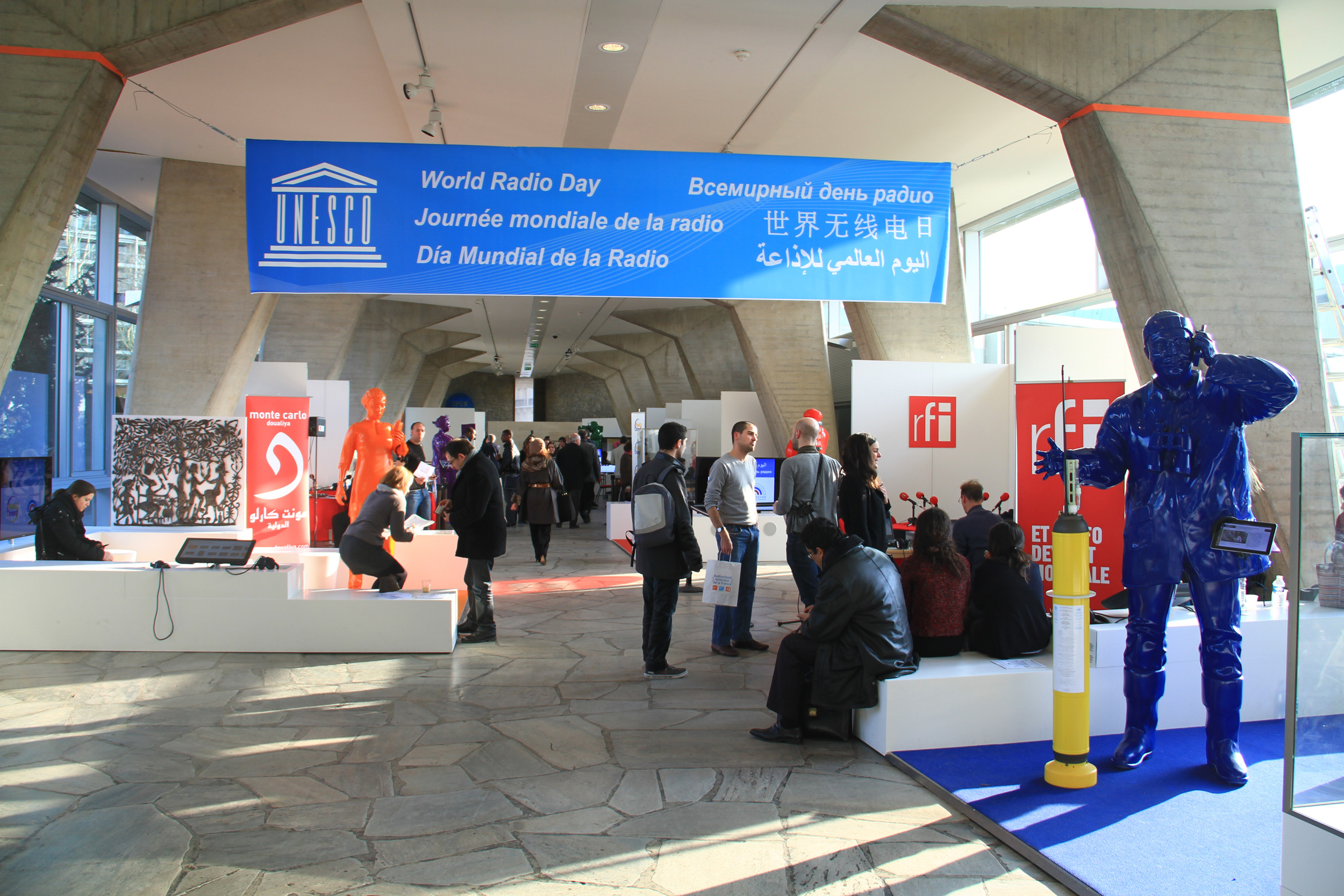
- WRD event 2013 at UNESCO Headquarters
- Also called: WRD
- Observances: Encouraging radio stations to make use of new free resources
- Begins: 2011; 15 years ago
- Date: 13 February
- Next time: 13 February 2026
- Frequency: Annual
- Related to: Radio and AI

World Radio Day (French: Le jour mondial de la radio) is an international day celebrated on February 13 each year. The day was designated by UNESCO on November 3, 2011, during its 36th conference.

== Background ==
Following a request from the Spanish Radio Academy on the 20th of September, 2010, Spain proposed that the UNESCO Executive Board include an agenda item on the proclamation of World Radio Day. UNESCO's Executive Board added the agenda item to its provisional agenda for the proclamation of a "World Radio Day" on September 29, 2011. Upon receiving favorable responses and official support from the Arab States Broadcasting Union (ASBU), the Asia-Pacific Broadcasting Union (ABU), the African Union of Broadcasting (AUB), the Caribbean Broadcasting Union (CBU), the European Broadcasting Union (EBU), the International Association of Broadcasting (IAB), the North American Broadcasters Association (NABA), the Organization de Telecommunications Ibeoramericanas (OTI), BBC, URTI, Vatican Radio, etc., the proposal was approved.

The 13th of February was recommended as the official day due to it being “the day the United Nations established the whole concept of the United Nations Radio, in 1946”. The Board requested that UNESCO's Director-General bring the resolution to the attention of the Secretary-General of the United Nations so that World Radio Day could be endorsed by the General Assembly and celebrated by the whole system. The matter was subsequently treated by UNESCO's General Conference, which adopted the resolution in file 36 C/63. World Radio Day was thus unanimously proclaimed by all member states of UNESCO in November, 2011.

In December, 2012, The General Assembly of the UN endorsed the proclamation of World Radio Day, which thereby became a day to be celebrated by all UN agencies, funds, and programs and their partners.That year the led the creation of the to collaborate with UNESCO in the annual organization of the World Radio Day celebrations.

== First World Radio Day ==
Logo of the first World Radio Day

In honor of the first World Radio Day in 2012, Lifeline Energy, Frontline SMS, SOAS Radio and Empower house hosted a seminar in London. A variety of practitioners, academics, and tool providers joined the School of Oriental and African Studies to explore ways in which radio reaches even the most remote and vulnerable communities. Speakers included Guy Berger (Director for Freedom of Expression and Media Development at UNESCO), Dr. Chege Githiora (Chairman of the Centre of African Studies at SOAS), Brigitte Jallov (Empower house/ Panos London), Amy O'Donnell (FrontlineSMS: Radio), Carlos Chirinos (SOAS Radio), and Linje Manyozo (LSE). The panel was moderated by Lucy Durán (SOAS, BBC Radio 3, Human Planet). At the University of Pisa in Italy, a public event was held on February 13, 2012 to commemorate World Radio Day. The event was organised by Italradio and the Faculty of Engineering and Telecommunication and focused on the cost and ease of use of radio as a source of information.

In 2012, in Barcelona, Spain, a public event organised by the College of Telecommunications Engineers of Catalunya (COETTC) was held on the 21st of February, 2012 to commemorate World Radio Day. The event was organised with the help of the Government of Catalonia. The main event was a panel discussion entitled "For a more global and competitive radio". In Switzerland, the European Broadcasting Union organized a Digital Radio Week. This was a series of technical events starting on the 13th of February, 2012, with the participation of the main radio standardization organizations: DRM Consortium, WorldDMB, RadioDNS. There was also a local digital radio transmission in DAB+ demonstrating the democratization of transmission for smaller structures, using CRC mmb Tools open software-defined radio tools.

Bangladesh NGOs Network for Radio and Communication (BNNRC) promotes the observance of World Radio Day on the 13th of February in collaboration with public service Broadcasting, Commercial Broadcasting & Community Broadcasting at the local and national levels. The World Radio Day Observation National Committee was established in Bangladesh for this purpose.

== Topics ==
- 2013: Radio in the first half of the 20th century
- 2014: Gender equality in radio
- 2015: Youth and radio
- 2016: Radio in Times of Disaster and Emergency
- 2017: The Radio Is You
- 2018: Radio & Sports
- 2019: Dialogue, tolerance and peace
- 2020: Diversity
- 2021: New World, New Radio
- 2022: Radio and Trust
- 2023: Radio & Peace
- 2024: Radio: A Century of Informing, Entertaining and Educating
- 2025: Radio and Climate Change
- 2026: "Radio and Artificial Intelligence", with UNESCO inviting broadcasters and audio creators worldwide to reflect on how AI is changing radio production.

The DRM Consortium will contribute to UNESCO World Radio Day 2026 in an unprecedented way by showcasing how broadcasters can deliver AI-enabled e-learning via digital radio.
