= Fernando Costilla =

Spanish television personality and voice actor

Fernando Costilla (born 28 November 1972 in Vigo, Spain) is a Spanish television personality and voice actor, known for the voice in Cuatro's program's Takeshi's Castle, WWE Raw and WWE SmackDown, and also the voice in Marca TV's program's WWE Raw and WWE SmackDown with Héctor del Mar.

He currently Works El Mundo Today.
