= Academia Española de la Radio =

Spanish institution with aims of promoting Spanish radio

- Formation: 1997; 28 years ago
- Founder: Jorge Álvarez
- Website: https://academiadelaradio.es/

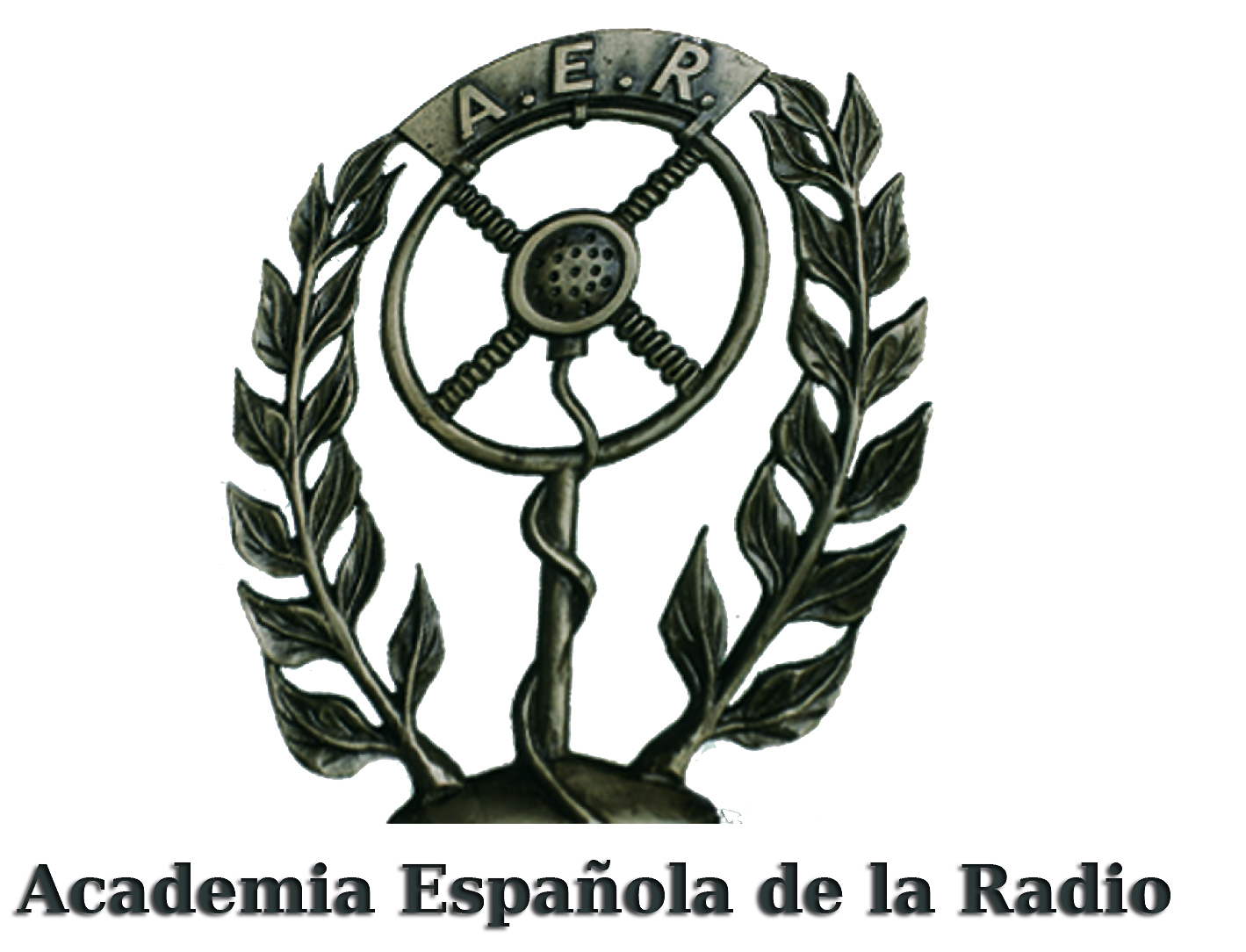

The Spanish Academy of Radio Arts and Sciences is an institution which aims to promote radio in Spain and represents the interests of radio professionals as well as providing training to existing and future radio professionals.

The radio producer and sound engineer Jorge Álvarez founded the academy in 1997.

The academy promoted the establishment of the World Radio Day by UNESCO. Its chairman, Jorge Álvarez, asked UNESCO, in 2008, for this international day of celebration for all broadcasters and radio listeners around the world. Finally, on November 3, 2011, the 36th Conference General of UNESCO unanimously approved the Spanish proposal and designated February 13 as World Radio Day.

In 2012, this Academy founded the International Committee of Radio in union with broadcasting organisations from five continents and under the auspices of UNESCO and ITU.
