= Jushin Thunder Liger Mexican Retirement Show =

2019 Consejo Mundial de Lucha Libre professional wrestling event

Jushin "Thunder" Liger Mexican Retirement Show
- Promotional poster featuring various CMLL wrestlers
- Promotion: Consejo Mundial de Lucha Libre
- Date: July 19, 2019
- City: Mexico City, Mexico
- Venue: Arena México

Event chronology
← Previous; Copa Dinastías	Next → Universal Amazons Championship

The Jushin "Thunder" Liger Mexican Retirement Show, or more properly Liger: El Adiós de México en La México (Spanish for "Liger: The Goodbye to Mexico in [Arena] Mexico"), was a professional wrestling super card held on July 19, 2019. The show was produced and scripted by the Mexican professional wrestling promotion Consejo Mundial de Lucha Libre (CMLL; Spanish for "World Wrestling Council") and took place at Arena México in Mexico City, Mexico. This special edition of CMLL's Super Viernes show featured one of the last matches in Mexico of long-time Japanese professional wrestler Jushin "Thunder" Liger.

== Production ==
=== Background ===
After graduating high school in the early 1980s, Keiichi Yamada would apply to New Japan Pro-Wrestling's (NJPW) dojo in the hope of becoming a professional wrestler. He was not accepted because he did not meet the height requirements the dojo had at that time. Yamada, determined not to give up his dream of becoming a professional wrestler, left for Mexico and began his training there. By his own account, he was almost starving while studying in Mexico, due to this NJPW officials who were visiting took pity on him and asked him to come back to Japan to train in their dojo. In the NJPW dojo, he trained alongside the likes of Keiji Mutoh, Masahiro Chono and Shinya Hashimoto. While continuing his training, he had his debut match in March 1984 at the age of 19, wrestling against Shunji Kosugi. On April 24, 1989, Yamada adopted his "Jushin Liger" persona, a gimmick based on an extremely popular anime superhero, Jushin Liger. On November 12, 1996, Liger made his CMLL debut defeating El Dandy; Liger continued to make appearances for CMLL throughout the 1990s, 2000s, and 2010s, becoming a one-time CMLL World Middleweight Champion, a one-time CMLL World Tag Team Champion, and the 2010 CMLL Universal Champion. On March 7, 2019, it was announced that Liger would retire on January 5, 2020, at the Tokyo Dome, with his Mexican retirement event occurring on July 19, 2019.

=== Storylines ===
The event featured six professional wrestling matches with different wrestlers involved in pre-existing scripted feuds and storylines. Wrestlers portrayed heels (referred to as rudos in Mexican lucha libre, those that portray the "bad guys") or faces (técnicos in Mexican lucha libre, the "good guy" characters) as they participated in a series of tension-building events, which culminated in a wrestling match or series of matches.

== Aftermath ==
Liger worked two additional shows in Mexico as part of his retirement tour. On July 20 he worked a CMLL and Lucha Libre Real co-promoted show, where he first faced 10 wrestlers in individual 10 minute matches. He went to a 1-minute draw against Negro Casas, Blue Panther, Atlantis, Carístico, Ángel de Oro, Titán, El Felino, Mr. Águila, El Cuatrero, and Aero Boy. Later in the main event, Liger defeated El Felino and Mr. Águila in a three-way match. His final match in Mexico was on July 21 at a CMLL, Legend, and Universal Wrestling Entertainment show where he teamed up with Místico to defeat Carístico and Último Guerrero. Liger worked the final match of his career on January 5, 2020, as part of the Wrestle Kingdom 14 show.

== Results ==
No.	Results	Stipulations
1	Sonic and Súper Astro Jr. defeated Los Cancerberos del Infierno (Cancerbero and Raziel)	Tag team match
2	Los Hermanos Chavez (Ángel de Oro and Niebla Roja) and Esfinge defeated Los Hijos del Infierno (Ephesto and Luciferno) and Hechicero	Trios match
3	Marcela (c) defeated La Amapola	Singles match for the CMLL World Women's Championship
4	Nueva Generación Dinamitas (El Cuatrero, Forastero, and Sansón) and Volador Jr. defeated Los Guerreros Laguneros (Euforia and Gran Guerrero), El Soberano, and Templario	Relevos Atómicos Increíbles match
5	La Familia Real (L.A. Park, L.A. Park Jr., and El Hijo de L.A. Park) defeated Dinastía Muñoz (La Bestia del Ring, Rush and Místico)	Trios match
6	Jushin "Thunder" Liger defeated Carístico, Negro Casas, and Último Guerrero	Relevo CMLL match
(c) / – the champion(s) heading into the match
