= 2015 AIBA World Boxing Championships – Light heavyweight =

Boxing competitions

The light heavyweight competition at the 2015 AIBA World Boxing Championships was held from 7–15 October 2015. This was a qualifying tournament for the 2016 Summer Olympics.

== Medalists ==
Gold	Julio César la Cruz (CUB)
Silver	Joe Ward (IRL)
Bronze	Elshod Rasulov (UZB)
Bronze	Pavel Silyagin (RUS)

== Seeds ==
1. (Kazakhstan) Adilbek Niyazymbetov (quarterfinals)
2. (Cuba) Julio César la Cruz
3. (Azerbaijan) Teymur Mammadov (round of 16)
4. (Republic of Ireland) Joe Ward

== Draw ==
=== Finals ===
Semifinals
1	Elshod Rasulov (UZB)	0
4	Joe Ward (IRL)	3
3	Pavel Silyagin (RUS)	0
2	Julio César la Cruz (CUB)	3

Final
Joe Ward (IRL)	0
Julio César la Cruz (CUB)	3

==== Section 1 ====
Round of 32
Erkin Adylbek Uulu (KGZ)	0
Alaa Ghoussoun (SYR)	3
Marcos Escudero (ARG)	1
Cem Karlidag (TUR)	2
Albert Ramirez Duran (VEN)	0
Elshod Rasulov (UZB)	3
Hakan Murst Nuraydin (QAT)	3
Džemal Bošnjak (BIH)	0
Oleksandr Khyzhniak (UKR)	3
Abdelhafid Benchabla (ALG)	0

Round of 16
Adilbek Niyazymbetov (KAZ)	3
Alaa Ghoussoun (SYR)	0
Cem Karlidag (TUR)	0
Elshod Rasulov (UZB)	3
Mikhail Dauhaliavets (BLR)	3
Hakan Murst Nuraydin (QAT)	0
Oleksandr Khyzhniak (UKR)	0
Joe Ward (IRL)	3

Quarterfinals
Adilbek Niyazymbetov (KAZ)	0
Elshod Rasulov (UZB)	3
Mikhail Dauhaliavets (BLR)	0
Joe Ward (IRL)	3

Semifinals
Elshod Rasulov (UZB)	0
Joe Ward (IRL)	3

==== Section 2 ====
Round of 32
Abdel Rahman Salah Oraby (EGY)	1
Pavel Silyagin (RUS)	2
Hassan Saada (MAR)	3
Steven Nelson (USA)	0
Juan Carlos Carrillo (COL)	0
Hrvoje Sep (CRO)	3
Aaron Spagnolo (AUS)	3
Tashi Norbu (BHU)	0
Kim Hyeong-kyu (KOR)	0
Joshua Buatsi (GBR)	3

Round of 16
Teymur Mammadov (AZE)	0
Pavel Silyagin (RUS)	3
Hassan Saada (MAR)
Peter Müllenberg (NED)	TKO
Hrvoje Sep (CRO)	3
Aaron Spagnolo (AUS)	0
Joshua Buatsi (GBR)	0
Julio César la Cruz (CUB)	3

Quarterfinals
Pavel Silyagin (RUS)	3
Peter Müllenberg (NED)	0
Hrvoje Sep (CRO)	0
Julio César la Cruz (CUB)	3

Semifinals
Pavel Silyagin (RUS)	0
Julio César la Cruz (CUB)	3

== Results ==
=== Ranking ===
Rank	Athlete
1st place, gold medalist(s)	Julio César la Cruz (CUB)
2nd place, silver medalist(s)	Joe Ward (IRL)
3rd place, bronze medalist(s)	Elshod Rasulov (UZB)
3rd place, bronze medalist(s)	Pavel Silyagin (RUS)
5	Adilbek Niyazymbetov (KAZ)
5	Mikhail Dauhaliavets (BLR)
5	Peter Müllenberg (NED)
5	Hrvoje Sep (CRO)
9	Alaa Ghoussoun (SYR)
9	Cem Karlidag (TUR)
9	Oleksandr Khyzhniak (UKR)
9	Hakan Murst Nuraydin (QAT)
9	Teymur Mammadov (AZE)
9	Hassan Saada (MAR)
9	Aaron Spagnolo (AUS)
9	Joshua Buatsi (GBR)
17	Erkin Adylbek Uulu (KGZ)
17	Marcos Escudero (ARG)
17	Albert Ramirez Duran (VEN)
17	Džemal Bošnjak (BIH)
17	Abdelhafid Benchabla (ALG)
17	Abdel Rahman Salah Oraby (EGY)
17	Steven Nelson (USA)
17	Juan Carlos Carrillo (COL)
17	Tashi Norbu (BHU)
17	Kim Hyeong-kyu (KOR)
