= MLW Super Series (2023) =

2023 Major League Wrestling and Lucha Libre AAA Worldwide event

- Promotion(s): Major League Wrestling; Lucha Libre AAA World Wide; Promociones EMW
- Date: February 10, 2023
- City: Tijuana, Baja California, Mexico
- Venue: Auditorio Fausto Gutierrez Moreno

Event chronology
← Previous
- Rey de Reyes (AAA)
- SuperFight (MLW)
Next →
- The World is a Vampire (AAA)
- War Chamber (MLW)

Super Series chronology
← Previous; 2022	Next → —

Super Series (2023) was a professional wrestling supercard event produced by Major League Wrestling (MLW), in conjunction with Lucha Libre AAA Worldwide (AAA) and Promociones EMW (EMW). It took place on February 10, 2023, at Auditorio Fausto Gutierrez Moreno in Tijuana, Baja California, Mexico.

It was the third event in the MLW Super Series chronology, following the 2022 event in Georgia, and served as a television taping for the new season of MLW Fusion that premiered on May 25, 2023.

== Production ==
=== Background ===
On March 13, 2020, Major League Wrestling (MLW) held their inaugural Super Series event, titled AAA vs. MLW Super Series. The event was held in collaboration with the Lucha Libre AAA Worldwide (AAA) and Promociones EMW (EMW) promotions at Auditorio Fausto Gutierrez Moreno in Tijuana. Over two years later, on September 18, 2022, a second Super Series event was held at the Space Event Center in Norcross, Georgia. The event was held in collaboration with AAA and the Japan-based Dragon Gate group.

On February 10, 2023, MLW held a third Super Series event, in collaboration with AAA and EMW, with the event returning to Tijuana's Auditorio Fausto Gutierrez Moreno.

=== Storylines ===
Super Series featured eight professional wrestling matches that featured wrestlers involved in scripted feuds. The wrestlers portrayed either heels (referred to as rudos in Mexico, those that play the part of the "bad guys"), faces (técnicos in Mexico, the "good guy" characters), or less distinguishable characters ("tweeners") as they performed.

== Results ==
No.	Results	Stipulations	Times
1	Alex Kane (with Anton Carrillo) defeated Delirious	Singles match	9:35
2	Los Macizos (Ciclope and Miedo Extremo) defeated Anton Carrillo and Extassis, Arkángel Divino and Último Maldito, and Fantastik and Rayo Star	Four-way tag team Street Fight	10:44
3	Taya Valkyrie (c) defeated La Hiedra, Dalys, and Sexy Star II	Four-way match for the MLW Women's World Featherweight Championship and AAA Reina de Reinas Championship	10:57
4	La Rebelión (Bestia 666 and Mecha Wolf) defeated Abismo Negro Jr. and Taurus	Tag team match	12:05
5	Juicy Finau defeated Crazy Frank and Damián 666	Three-way match	14:53
6	Alexander Hammerstone defeated Danny Limelight	Singles match	8:52
7	Jack Cartwheel, Myzteziz Jr., and Willie Mack defeated Dinámico, Genio del Aire, and Skalibur	Trios match	13:33
8	Hijo del Vikingo, Psycho Clown, and Rey Horus defeated Johnny Caballero and La Empresa (Gringo Loco and Sam Adonis)	Trios match	14:26
(c) / – the champion(s) heading into the match
