= Boxing at the 2015 Pan American Games – Men's light heavyweight =

Men's Light heavyweight at the 2015 Pan American Games
- Venue: Oshawa Sports Centre
- Dates: July 19–25
- Competitors: 10 from 10 nations

Medalists
Gold medal	Julio César la Cruz	Cuba
Silver medal	Albert Ramirez Duran	Venezuela
Bronze medal	Juan Carlos Carrillo	Colombia
Bronze medal	Rogelio Romero	Mexico

The light heavyweight competition of the boxing events at the 2015 Pan American Games in Toronto, Ontario, Canada, was held between the 19 and 25 of July at the Oshawa Sports Centre. The defending champion is Julio La Cruz of Cuba. Light heavyweights is limited to those boxers weighing less than or equal to 81 kilograms.

Like all Pan American boxing events, the competition is a straight single-elimination tournament. Both semifinal losers are awarded bronze medals, so no boxers compete again after their first loss. Bouts consist of a 3 rounds "10-point must" scoring system used in the pro game, where the winner of each round must be awarded 10 points and the loser a lesser amount, and the elimination of the padded headgear. Five judges scored each bout. The winner will be the boxer who scored the most at the end of the match.

== Qualification ==
A total of ten boxers qualified to compete.

== Results ==
=== Bracket ===
Preliminaries; July 19, 2015
Carlos Mina (ECU)	TKO R1 2:25
Adrian Biscette (BAR)	0
Michel de Souza Borges (BRA)	2
Steven Nelson (USA)	1

Quarterfinals; July 21, 2015
Julio César la Cruz (CUB)	3
Carlos Mina (ECU)	0
Juan Carlos Carrillo (COL)	3
Marcos Escudero (ARG)	0
Jose Moya Hernandez (CRC)	0
Rogelio Romero (MEX)	3
Michel de Souza Borges (BRA)	0
Albert Ramirez Duran (VEN)	3

Semifinals; July 23, 2015
Julio César la Cruz (CUB)	3
Juan Carlos Carrillo (COL)	0
Rogelio Romero (MEX)	0
Albert Ramirez Duran (VEN)	3

Finals; July 25, 2015
Julio César la Cruz (CUB)	3
Albert Ramirez Duran (VEN)	0
