= MLW Super Series =

Co-promoted professional wrestling event series

- Promotions: Major League Wrestling; Lucha Libre AAA Worldwide; Promociones EMW (2020, 2023); Dragon Gate (2022)
- First event: AAA vs MLW

MLW Super Series is a professional wrestling supercard event promoted by the American promotion Major League Wrestling (MLW). Since its inception in 2020, it is held in conjunction with Lucha Libre AAA Worldwide (AAA), Promociones EMW (EMW), and Dragon Gate and features direct competition between wrestlers from these promotions.

== History ==
In August 2018, Major League Wrestling (MLW) announced that they had started a working agreement with Mexican-based promotion Lucha Libre AAA Worldwide (AAA). Nearly two years later on February 5, 2020, MLW announced that it would be holding its first co-promoted event with AAA on March 13, held in conjunction with AAA's local Tijuana partner Promociones EMW. This marked the second MLW event promoted in Mexico, following the Crash/Major League Wrestling show held on October 5, 2019.

On July 22, 2022, it was announced that the second Super Series would be taking place on September 18, with MLW making its Atlanta metropolitan area debut at the Space Event Center in Norcross, Georgia, thus establishing Super Series as an annual event. Promotions participating in the event include AAA and Dragon Gate. On February 10, 2023, MLW held the third Super Series event, in collaboration with AAA and EMW, with the event returning to Tijuana's Auditorio Fausto Gutierrez Moreno.

== Events ==
#	Event	Date	City	Venue	Main event	Ref.
1	AAA vs MLW	March 13, 2020	Tijuana, Baja California, Mexico	Auditorio Fausto Gutierrez Moreno	La Familia Real (L. A. Park, El Hijo de L.A. Park, and L. A. Park Jr.) vs. Psycho Clown, Nicho el Millonario, and Niño Hamburguesa in a No Disqualification trios match	
2	MLW Super Series (2022)	September 18, 2022	Norcross, Georgia	Space Events Center	Laredo Kid, Komander, and Microman vs. Mini Abismo Negro, Gino Medina, and Taurus (with Dr. Dax) in a Loser Leaves Town Trios match	
3	MLW Super Series (2023)	February 10, 2023	Tijuana, Baja California, Mexico	Auditorio Fausto Gutierrez Moreno	El Hijo del Vikingo, Psycho Clown, and Rey Horus vs. Johnny Caballero and La Empresa (Gringo Loco and Sam Adonis) in a Trios match	

== See also ==
- List of Major League Wrestling events
