= Juan Carlos Carrillo =

Colombian boxer (born 1992)

Personal information
- Full name: Juan Carlos Carrillo Palacio
- Born: 10 October 1992 (age 33) Barranquilla, Colombia
- Height: 192 cm (6 ft 4 in)
- Weight: Light-heavyweight

Boxing career
- Reach: 187 cm (74 in)
- Stance: Southpaw

Boxing record
- Total fights: 16
- Wins: 15
- Win by KO: 11
- Losses: 1
Medal record
Representing Colombia
Men's amateur boxing
Pan American Games
Bronze medal – third place	2015 Toronto	Light heavyweight
Central American and Caribbean Games
Silver medal – second place	2014 Veracruz	Light heavyweight
Youth Olympic Games
Silver medal – second place	2010 Singapore	Middleweight

Juan Carlos Carrillo Palacio (born 10 October 1992) is a Colombian professional boxer. As an amateur he competed in the light heavyweight event at the 2016 Summer Olympics. Carrillo turned professional in 2019. He won the vacant WBO Inter-continental light-heavyweight title with a majority decision success over Richard Vansiclen at Turning Stone Resort Casino in Verona, New York, United States, on 9 June 2023. Having amassed a record of 15 victories from 15 pro-fights, Carrillo challenged WBO Latino light-heavyweight champion, and fellow unbeaten boxer, Najee Lopez at the USC Galen Center in Los Angeles, California, United States, on 29 August 2026, losing by knockout in the ninth round.

== Professional boxing record ==
16 fights	15 wins	1 loss
By knockout	11	1
By decision	4	0

No.	Result	Record	Opponent	Type	Round, time	Date	Location	Notes
16	Loss	15–1	Najee Lopez	KO	9 (10), 1:33	29 Aug 2026	USC Galen Center, Los Angeles, California, U.S.	For WBO Latino light-heavyweight title
15	Win	15–0	Marlon Delgado	KO	4 (8), 2:59	2 May 2026	T-Mobile Arena, Paradise, Nevada, U.S.	
14	Win	14–0	Cristian Andres Pena	KO	1 (10), 2:24	15 Feb 2025	Parque 11 de Noviembre, Santa Marta, Colombia	
13	Win	13–0	Lenin Castillo	UD	10	18 Oct 2024	Coca Cola Music Hall, San Juan, Puerto Rico	
12	Win	12–0	Quinton Rankin	TKO	3 (10), 0:20	28 Mar 2024	Wayne State Fieldhouse, Detroit, Michigan, U.S.	
11	Win	11–0	Richard Vansiclen	MD	10	9 Jun 2023	Turning Stone Resort Casino, Verona, New York, U.S.	Won vacant WBO Inter-continental light-heavyweight title
10	Win	10–0	Robert Burwell	TKO	4 (8), 2:05	17 Feb 2023	Stormont Vail Events Center, Topeka, Kansas, U.S.	
9	Win	9–0	Matthew Tinker	TKO	3 (8), 1:16	22 Nov 2022	Edison Ballroom, Manhattan, New York, U.S.	
8	Win	8–0	Victor Fonseca Calderas	RTD	2 (8), 3:00	13 Aug 2022	Memorial Hall, Melrose, Massachusetts, U.S.	
7	Win	7–0	Emilio Julio	RTD	3 (10)	20 Nov 2021	Coliseo Luis Patron Rosano, Tolú, Colombia	
6	Win	6–0	Rafael Fernandez Sosa	KO	3 (8), 1:26	6 Aug 2021	Cancha Santo Angel, Monte Plata, Dominican Republic	
5	Win	5–0	Reinaldo Gonzalez	TKO	3 (8), 1:31	12 Mar 2021	Hotel Catalonia Malecon Center, Santo Domingo, Dominican Republic	
4	Win	4–0	Khainell Wheeler	UD	6	30 Jan 2021	Four Ambassadors Hotel, Miami, Florida, U.S.	
3	Win	3–0	Ben Williams	KO	2 (6), 2:27	8 Feb 2020	Hard Rock Hotel, Daytona Beach, Florida, U.S.	
2	Win	2–0	Afunwa King	UD	4	24 Oct 2019	Generoso Pope Athletic Complex, Brooklyn, New York, U.S.	
1	Win	1–0	Yendris Rodriguez Valdez	TKO	2 (4), 1:47	17 May 2019	Joe Celestin Center, Miami, Florida, U.S.	
