= The World is a Vampire: NWA vs. AAA =

2023 National Wrestling Alliance and Lucha Libre AAA World Wide event

- Promotional poster featuring Billy Corgan amongst various NWA and AAA wrestlers
- Promotion(s): National Wrestling Alliance; Lucha Libre AAA Worldwide
- Date: March 4, 2023
- City: Iztacalco, Mexico City, Mexico
- Venue: Foro Sol
- Attendance: 30,000+

NWA Pop-Up Event chronology
← Previous; NWA PowerrrTrip 2	Next → Hard Times

AAA event chronology
← Previous; Super Series	Next → Lucha Libre World Cup

The World is a Vampire: NWA vs. AAA was a professional wrestling supercard co-promoted by the American-based National Wrestling Alliance (NWA) promotion and the Mexican Lucha Libre AAA Worldwide (AAA) promotion. Held as part of the NWA Pop-Up Event series, the event took place on March 4, 2023 at Foro Sol in Iztacalco, Mexico City, Mexico during The World is a Vampire music festival organized by NWA owner Billy Corgan's band The Smashing Pumpkins. The event marked the first collaborative event held by the NWA and AAA.

In the main event, Tyrus defeated Daga to retain the NWA Worlds Heavyweight Championship. In other prominent matches, Kerry Morton defeated Sal the Pal and Jack Cartwheel in a three-way match to retain the NWA World Junior Heavyweight Championship, Nueva Generación Dinamita (El Cuatrero, Sansón, and Forastero) defeated Thom Latimer, Chris Masters, and Kratos to retain the AAA World Trios Championship, and La Rebelión (Bestia 666 and Mecha Wolf) defeated Vampiro and Blue Demon Jr. to retain the NWA World Tag Team Championship.

== Production ==
=== Background ===
In August 2021, the American-based National Wrestling Alliance (NWA) promotion announced a working relationship with Mexico's Lucha Libre AAA Worldwide (AAA), with AAA wrestlers making appearances at NWA EmPowerrr and the NWA 73rd Anniversary Show. On March 31, 2022, at AAA Invades WrestleCon, La Rebelión (Bestia 666 and Mecha Wolf 450) successfully defended their NWA World Tag Team Championship against Aero Star and Drago, marking the first time a NWA title was defended during a Lucha Libre AAA event.

On November 23, 2022, the NWA officially announced The World is a Vampire: NWA vs. AAA, the first collaborative event promoted by the NWA and AAA. The event will be held on March 4, 2023 at Foro Sol in Iztacalco, Mexico City, Mexico as part of The World is a Vampire music festival organized by The Smashing Pumpkins, of which NWA President Billy Corgan is a member.

=== Storylines ===
The World is a Vampire: NWA vs. AAA featured eight professional wrestling matches, with different wrestlers involved in pre-existing scripted feuds, plots and storylines. Wrestlers portrayed either heels (referred to as rudos in Mexico, those that portray the "bad guys") or faces (técnicos in Mexico, the "good guy" characters) as they engaged in a series of tension-building events, which culminated in a wrestling match.

== Results ==
No.	Results	Stipulations	Times
1	Komander and Octagón Jr. defeated Homicide and Cyon	Tag team match	7:10
2	Arez and La Hiedra defeated Aron Stevens and Natalia Markova	Mixed tag team match	11:06
3	Kerry Morton (c) defeated Sal the Pal and Jack Cartwheel	Three-way match for the NWA World Junior Heavyweight Championship	10:22
4	Psycho Clown defeated Trevor Murdoch	No Disqualification match	6:15
5	Nueva Generación Dinamita (El Cuatrero, Sansón, and Forastero) (c) defeated Thom Latimer, Chris Masters, and Kratos	Trios match for the AAA World Trios Championship	—
6	La Rebelión (Bestia 666 and Mecha Wolf 450) (c) (with Damián 666) defeated Vampiro and Blue Demon Jr.	Tag team match for the NWA World Tag Team Championship	10:58
7	Kamille (c) defeated Flammer	Singles match for the NWA World Women's Championship	9:05
8	Tyrus (c) defeated Daga	Singles match for the NWA Worlds Heavyweight Championship	4:57
(c) / – the champion(s) heading into the match

== See also ==
- 2023 in professional wrestling
