= NWA PowerrrTrip 2 =

2022 National Wrestling Alliance event

NWA PowerrrTrip
- Official poster featuring various NWA wrestlers
- Promotions: National Wrestling Alliance; Tried-N-True Wrestling
- Date: April 30, 2022
- City: Oak Grove, Kentucky
- Venue: Valor Hall

Pop-Up Event chronology
← Previous; PowerrrTrip 1	Next → The World is a Vampire: NWA vs. AAA

PowerrrTrip chronology
← Previous; 1	Next → TBA

NWA PowerrrTrip 2, part of the NWA Pop-Up Event series and second in the PowerrrTrip chronology, was a professional wrestling supercard produced by the National Wrestling Alliance (NWA) in conjunction with Tried-N-True Pro Wrestling. The event took place on April 30, 2022, at the Valor Hall in Oak Grove, Kentucky. The event was a taping for NWA Power and NWA USA on FITE TV and YouTube.

== Production ==
=== Storylines ===
The event featured professional wrestling matches that involved different wrestlers from pre-existing scripted feuds and storylines. Wrestlers portrayed heroes, villains, or less distinguishable characters in scripted events that built tension and culminated in a wrestling match or series of matches. Storylines were produced during the eighth season and second season, respectively, of the NWA's weekly web series, Powerrr and USA.

On Night 2 of the Crockett Cup, Homicide defeated Austin Aries, Darius Lockhart, and Colby Corino in a four-way match to win the reactivated NWA World Junior Heavyweight Championship. On April 7, it was announced that Corino would challenge for the title against Homicide at PowerrTrip 2.

== Results ==
No.	Results	Stipulations	Times
1^{D}	Anthony Andrews defeated Gustavo Aguilar by pinfall	Singles match	4:02
2^{D}	The Ill Begotten (Alex Taylor and Jeremiah Plunkett) (with Danny Deals) defeated Ruff N' Ready (D'Vin Gaves and Diante) by pinfall	Tag team match	6:40
3^{D}	Gaagz The Gymp (with Father James Mitchell) defeated Magic Jake Dumas by pinfall	No Disqualification match	7:40
4	Max the Impaler defeated Ella Envy by pinfall	Singles match	3:20
5	Cyon defeated Joe Alonzo by pinfall	Singles match	16:32
6	Trevor Murdoch defeated Mike Knox via disqualification	Singles match	7:58
7	Jay Bradley defeated Brady Pierce by pinfall	Singles match	6:49
8	Mims defeated AJ Cazana by pinfall	Singles match	5:31
9	The Miserably Faithful (Judais and Sal The Pal) (with Father James Mitchell) defeated Jax Dane and Magic Jake Dumas by pinfall	Tag team match	7:41
10	Matt Vine defeated Eric Jackson by pinfall	Singles match	4:23
11	Thom Latimer defeated Rhett Titus by pinfall	Singles match	9:25
12	Homicide (c) defeated Colby Corino by pinfall	Singles match for the NWA World Junior Heavyweight Championship	9:55
13	Nick Aldis defeated Brian Myers via submission	Singles match	10:19
14	Tyrus defeated KC Roxx via disqualification	Bodyslam Challenge	1:10
15	KiLynn King and Missa Kate defeated Kamille and Kenzie Paige by pinfall	Tag team match	9:07
(c) / – the champion(s) heading into the match; D / – this was a dark match
