= Lucha Libre AAA Worldwide =

Mexican professional wrestling promotion owned by WWE

Promociones Antonio Peña, S.A. de C.V.
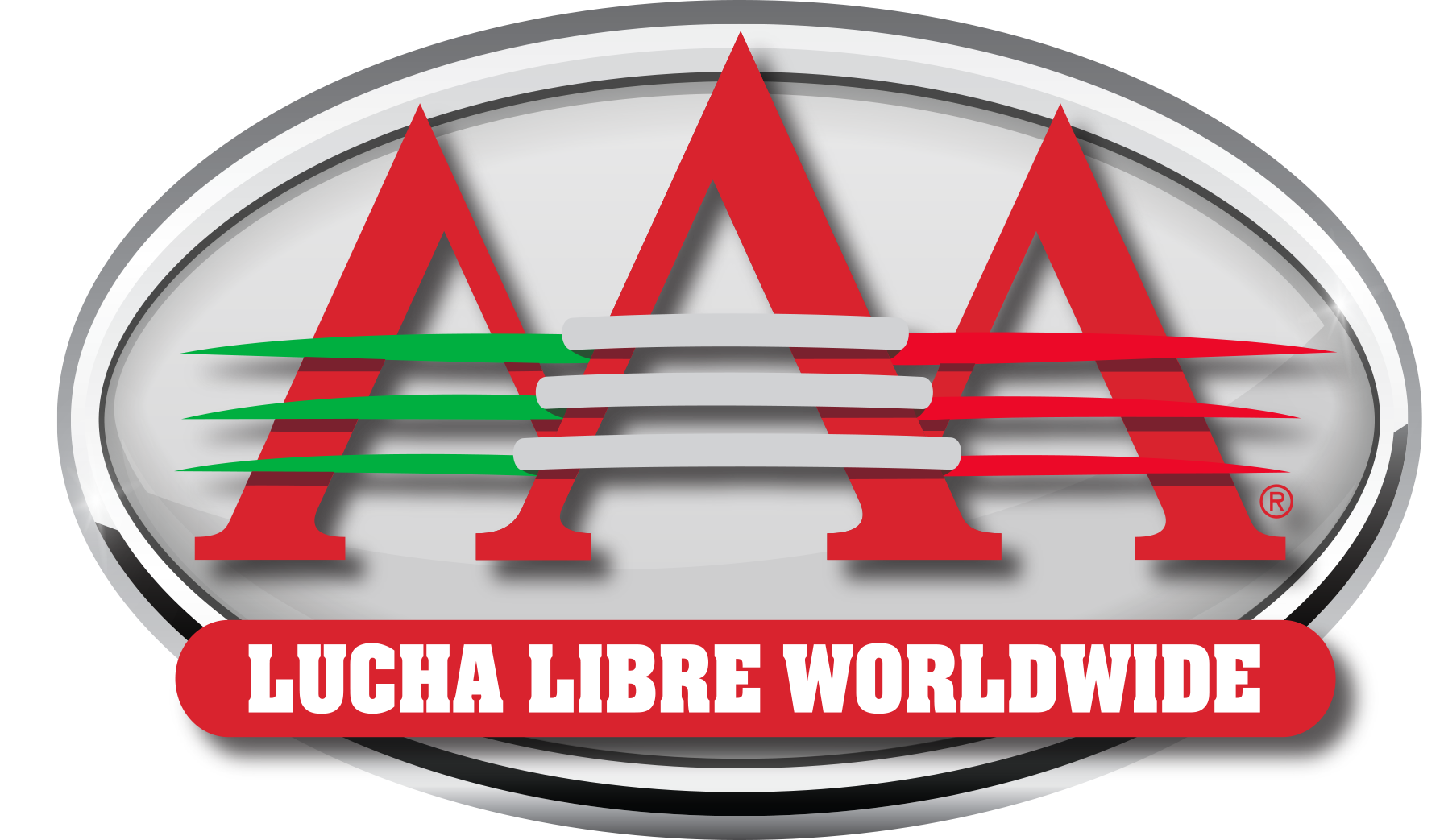
- Logo used since 2014. Used alongside WWE's logo for the promotion.
- Trade name: Lucha Libre AAA Worldwide
- Formerly: Asistencia, Asesoría y Administración de Espectáculos (Note: Most commonly written simply as Asistencia, Asesoría y Administración.) (1992–1995); AAA (1995–2015)
- Type: Private
- Industry: Professional wrestling
- Genre: Lucha libre; Lucha extrema; Sports entertainment
- Founded: April 30, 1992; 34 years ago
- Founder: Antonio Peña
- Headquarters: Mexico City, Mexico
- Key people: Nick Khan (President, WWE); Alberto Fasja (Executive Chairman, Fillip); Dorian Roldán (CEO and Director of Operations, AAA); Marisela Peña (President, AAA); Mark Calaway (Head of Creative, AAA); Paul “Triple H” Levesque (Executive Producer, AAA); Lee Fitting (Executive Producer, AAA)
- Products: Films; Home video; Live events; Merchandise; Music; Pay-per-view; Publishing; TV; Video on demand
- Services: Licensing
- Owner: Televisa (1992–1995); Peña–Roldán family (1995–2025); WWE (51%) and Fillip (49%) (2025–present)
- Website: luchalibreaaa.com

Lucha Libre AAA Worldwide, commonly referred to as simply AAA (pronounced "Triple A"), is a Mexican professional wrestling promotion based in Mexico City, Mexico. Founded as Asistencia, Asesoría y Administración de Espectáculos (lit. 'Assistance, Advisory, and Administration of Shows'), the promotion has been dubbed "La Caravana 3 Veces Estelar" (lit. 'The 3-Star Caravan') due to its extensive touring schedule.

The promotion was founded in 1992, when Antonio Peña, a booker from Consejo Mundial de Lucha Libre (CMLL), broke away from CMLL to set up his own promotion with the backing of Televisa that would provide him more creative freedom. Under Peña's direction, AAA incorporated telenovela-inspired sports entertainment elements into its product and developed a reputation for outlandish gimmicks and characters. In addition to the conventional "squared circle", the promotion occasionally uses a hexagonal wrestling ring and features much more extreme match styles compared to CMLL's conservative in-ring style. AAA, like all other wrestling promotions, does not promote legitimate sporting contests but rather athletic theater performances, featuring storyline-driven, scripted, and partially choreographed matches; however, matches often include moves that put performers at risk of serious injury or death if not performed correctly.

AAA has had working relationships with other Mexican promotions, like the International Wrestling Revolution Group, and with American promotions such as the National Wrestling Alliance, Major League Wrestling, and All Elite Wrestling. AAA primarily hosts its major events in Mexico, but has also promoted international events in the United States and Japan. The promotion previously aired its events on Gala TV in Mexico and on TUDN in parts of Mexico and the United States. AAA events began airing on Fox properties in Mexico and Latin America in 2026.

In April 2025, American wrestling promotion WWE, a subsidiary of TKO Group Holdings, announced it would acquire AAA in partnership with Mexican company Fillip. This acquisition was finalized in August 2025 with WWE holding a 51% controlling stake.

== History ==
=== Formation and early years ===
First logo used by AAA

Between April and May of 1992, Antonio Peña, booker of the Mexico City-based Consejo Mundial de Lucha Libre (CMLL), broke with the promotion in favor of establishing his own group, along with Konnan and much of the younger talent from CMLL. This split resulted in the founding of the Televisa-backed Asistencia, Asesoría y Administración de Espectáculos (AAA) promotion. AAA would look for talent from other markets outside Mexico City, as they found and signed Tijuana natives Rey Misterio Sr., Rey Misterio Jr., and Psicosis. The promotion became known for signing top talent away from CMLL, such as El Hijo del Santo, Octagón, Blue Panther, Heavy Metal, Cien Caras, and Perro Aguayo. The rising popularity of AAA caused rival promotion the Universal Wrestling Association (UWA) to go out of business. Peña would quickly sign up top UWA draws for AAA, including El Canek, Dos Caras, and Los Villanos.

In 1994, AAA co-promoted the When Worlds Collide pay-per-view event with World Championship Wrestling (WCW), with WCW airing the event in the United States. The event was critically-acclaimed and is credited for popularizing lucha libre in the United States. Weeks after the show, Art Barr (a key member of AAA's Los Gringos Locos stable) died while visiting his family. AAA subsequently vacated the AAA/IWC World Tag Team Championship, which Barr held with Eddy Guerrero, and Barr's Los Gringos Locos stablemates Guerrero and Madonna's Boyfriend made their departures from AAA. In the aftermath of When Worlds Collide, El Hijo del Santo also departed the promotion as a result of creative problems. When the Mexican economy began to slow down due to the 1994–1995 peso crisis, AAA's ability to offer consistent work was impaired, leading to wrestlers like Fuerza Guerrera and Blue Panther departing the promotion. Talent such as Rey Misterio Jr., Psicosis, La Parka, and Juventud Guerrera would depart AAA in 1996 to join Konnan's short-lived TV Azteca-backed Promo Azteca before landing in the US-based Extreme Championship Wrestling and WCW promotions.

In the mid-1990s the name of the promotion was changed to simply be AAA (pronounced "Triple A"), with Televisa maintaining ownership of the original Asistencia, Asesoría y Administración de Espectáculos name, after Peña bought out Televisa's ownership stake and became independent of the media conglomerate. AAA events would continue to air on Televisa after the purchase. In early 1997, AAA established a working agreement with the World Wrestling Federation (WWF), with several AAA luchadores appearing at the WWF's 1997 Royal Rumble event.

AAA developed a working relationship with American wrestling promotion Total Nonstop Action Wrestling (TNA) in early 2004. Through the relationship, AAA sent the luchadores Juventud Guerrera, Héctor Garza, Abismo Negro, Heavy Metal, and Mr. Águila to TNA to compete in the America's X-Cup Tournament as a contingent known as Team Mexico, defeating Team USA in the finals to win the cup. TNA and AAA's initial working relationship would end in late 2004. TNA continued utilizing luchadores, but opted to contract them individually rather than booking them through AAA.

=== 2006–2014 ===
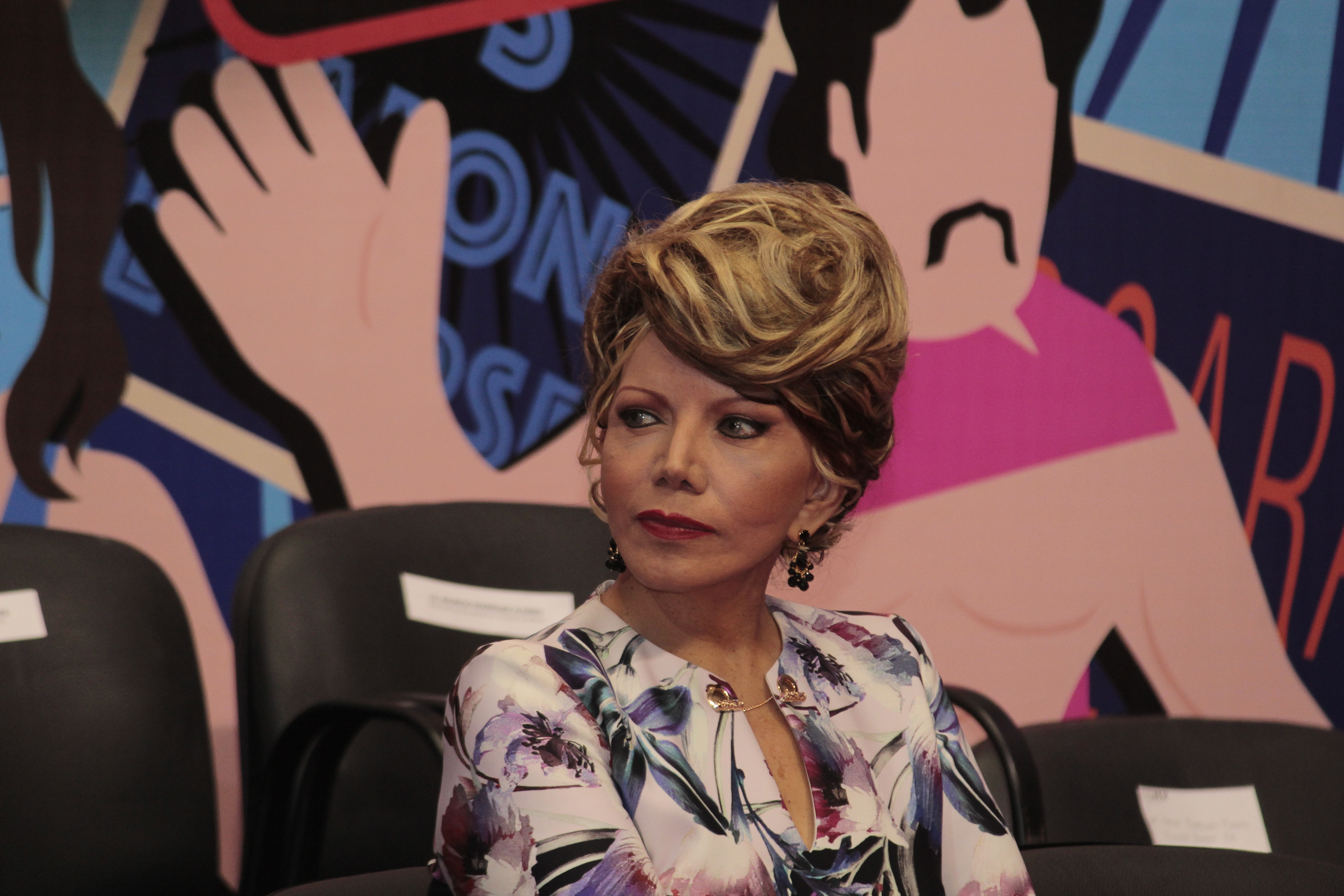
Marisela Peña, who has led AAA since 2006

On October 6, 2006, AAA founder Antonio Peña died of a heart attack. Following Peña's death, his sister Marisela Peña took over the management of AAA's finances, while Joaquín Roldán and Dorian Roldán became AAA's operational managers. Konnan would take over the booking of AAA. In 2006, AAA would again partner with Total Nonstop Action Wrestling (TNA), co-promoting TNA's inaugural event in Mexico, held at Arena Monterrey in November 2006. This partnership would end after AAA booker Konnan left TNA in June 2007 and filed a racial discrimination lawsuit against the promotion; the lawsuit was later dismissed. TNA would maintain a relationship with AAA rival CMLL from 2007 to 2009, but would begin another working relationship with AAA in February 2010.

In 2008, Lucha Libre USA presented AAA's Legendary Battles of Triplemania program on American pay-per-view. In 2009, AAA announced the development of a video game titled AAA El Videojuego. The game was later retitled Lucha Libre AAA: Héroes del Ring and released on October 12, 2010.

=== 2014–2020 ===
An old logo of AAA

On January 12, 2014, it was announced that, with the backing of Mark Burnett, AAA would co-produce a show for the American El Rey Network in the second half of the year. The one-hour weekly program would be accompanied by monthly and quarterly specials as well as live pay-per-view events. The show, titled Lucha Underground, premiered on October 29, 2014. The series ran for four seasons, and received generally positive reviews.

Beginning in March 2015, the promotion announced that it would be known as Lucha Libre AAA Worldwide from that point on, marking the second name change since its founding in 1992.

On April 8, 2017, AAA operational manager Joaquín Roldán died. On June 14, AAA events began airing on the Front Runner TV free-to-air channel in the United Kingdom.

In April and May 2018, some Lucha Libre Elite (Elite) talent including Teddy Hart, Juventud Guerrera, and Taurus made their returns to AAA wearing their Elite jerseys, launching an interpromotional angle between the two promotions. On June 4, at Verano de Escándalo, Jeff Jarrett returned to AAA after three years away from the promotion to defeat Rey Wagner and Rey Mysterio Jr. and win the AAA Mega Championship. Jarrett was assisted in the match by Konnan, who also returned to AAA at the event after two years.

On February 1, 2019, AAA announced the end of their relationship with Televisa after 27 years, with the promotion's programming moving to the Multimedios television station. On February 3, AAA announced that they had reached an agreement with TV Azteca to broadcast their programming on Azteca 7.

On April 4, 2019, AAA announced that it would be holding an event in the United States, AAA Invading NY, which would take place at New York City's Madison Square Garden on September 15, 2019. The promotion also announced that it would hold a second event in the United States, titled AAA Invading Los Angeles, at The Forum in Inglewood, California, on October 13, 2019. On August 16, 2019, it was reported by Pro Wrestling Insider that AAA Invading NY would be moved to the nearby Hulu Theater due to poor ticket sales. AAA Invading NY was held on September 15 at the Hulu Theater, headlined by Dr. Wagner Jr. vs. Blue Demon Jr. in a No Disqualification match. AAA Invading Los Angeles would later be canceled.

=== COVID-19 pandemic and aftermath ===
AAA would postpone and cancel its televised events in mid-March 2020 as a result of the COVID-19 pandemic, with its final pre-pandemic event being the AAA vs. MLW Super Series on March 13. In April 2020, AAA hosted a tournament called Lucha Fighter, which consisted of 12 male wrestlers and 8 female wrestlers; all Lucha Fighter matches were held without a live audience.

As a response to the indefinite recess of live sporting events in Mexico, on July 20, 2020, AAA announced a project called AutoLuchas, which consisted of events at Autódromo Hermanos Rodríguez where fans could attend from their car.

In December 2020, FactoryMade Ventures, one of the co-producers of Lucha Underground, filed a lawsuit with AAA; claiming to have exclusive rights to distribute AAA events and merchandise outside of Mexico. The lawsuit resulted in the geo-blocking of AAA's YouTube and Twitch channels in the United States.

On February 2, 2021, AAA secured an alliance with SECTUR to promote Mexico's tourist destinations. The alliance resulted in the launch of the Lucha por la Identidad Nacional Tour shows, which were held behind closed doors and included major AAA events like Rey de Reyes and Verano de Escándalo.

On August 14, 2021, Triplemanía XXIX was held at Arena Ciudad de México. It was the first AAA event since the COVID pandemic began to have a limited number of ticketed fans in attendance. October's Héroes Inmortales XIV would also have a limited live audience present.

=== Acquisition by WWE ===
Logo used by AAA following the acquisition by WWE

On April 19, 2025, shortly after announcing a joint event between its NXT brand division and AAA, WWE commentator Michael Cole announced during the WrestleMania 41 pre-show that WWE had reached an agreement to acquire AAA, as part of a joint venture with Mexican sports and entertainment company Fillip. The following month, it was reported that WWE will own 51% of AAA with Fillip owning the remaining 49%; the acquisition closed on August 1, 2025.

On November 25, 2025, WWE announced a media rights agreement with Fox, which will see AAA events air on Fox properties in Mexico and Latin America beginning in 2026. The agreement saw the launch of the Lucha Libre AAA on Fox program, which had its debut episode on January 17, 2026.

On July 23, 2026, WWE announced that Mattel would begin producing AAA action figures in Fall 2027, as an extension of Mattel's existing WWE action figures line.

== International partnerships ==
In 1997, AAA partnered with the Titan Sports–owned World Wrestling Federation (WWF, later WWE) to bring in a number of luchadores for the WWF's Royal Rumble event.

In April 2014, wrestling promoter Jeff Jarrett, who was credited with launching the AAA and Total Nonstop Action Wrestling (TNA) working relationship, left TNA. Jarrett's new promotion Global Force Wrestling (GFW) would begin working with AAA after its founding later in 2014. After the end of the AAA–GFW working relationship, TNA and AAA would begin to work with each other again, including collaborating on events such as the Lucha Libre World Cup on May 24, 2015.

In July 2015, Canadian-based International Wrestling Syndicate announced a talent partnership with AAA.

In August 2018, AAA started a working agreement with the American-based Major League Wrestling (MLW). AAA would also co-produce 3 special events with MLW, titled the Super Series, with the first event being AAA vs MLW held on March 13, 2020, at the Auditorio Fausto Gutierrez Moreno in Tijuana, Baja California, Mexico. The show was aired in four parts as part of MLW's weekly show MLW Fusion between April 11, 2020, and May 9, 2020. On September 18, 2022, MLW and AAA would hold another Super Series event in association with the Japanese promotion Dragon Gate at the Espacio Discotheque in Norcross, Georgia, airing in five parts between December 1, 2022, and January 5, 2023, as episodes of Fusion. The final Super Series show would be held on February 10, 2023 at the Auditorio Fausto Gutierrez Moreno in Tijuana, Baja California, Mexico and would air between May 25, 2023 and June 1, 2023 as episodes of Fusion with additional matches being aired on August 3, 2023, and August 10, 2023. The AAA–MLW partnership ended in September 2023 after MLW entered into an alliance with Consejo Mundial de Lucha Libre and New Japan Pro-Wrestling.

In February 2019, it was announced that AAA would be partnering with Tony Khan's All Elite Wrestling (AEW) promotion. The AAA–AEW partnership disintegrated in late 2022 after AAA's Noche de Campeones event, after Khan believed the circumstances in which AEW tag team FTR lost the AAA World Tag Team Championship to Dragon Lee and Dralístico at the event, followed by Lee immediately vacating the title and announcing his signing to WWE, constituted a double-cross on AAA's part.

In August 2021, AAA entered into a working agreement with the American-based National Wrestling Alliance (NWA) owned by Smashing Pumpkins frontman Billy Corgan with various AAA wrestlers making appearances at various NWA events along with Bestia 666 and Mecha Wolf of La Rebelión defending the NWA World Tag Team Championship at AAA Invades WrestleCon. On March 4, 2023, AAA and the NWA would hold a show at the Foro Sol Stadium in Mexico City, Mexico, titled The World is a Vampire: NWA vs. AAA. The event would air on April 9, 2023, and April 15, 2023, on AAA's YouTube channel and May 13, 2023, and May 20, 2023, on the NWA's YouTube channel.

In April 2025, it was announced that AAA would be partnering with WWE on its Worlds Collide event in June 2025, which will be a cross-promotion event which was initially limited to the NXT brand division but had been expanded to include Raw and SmackDown. In June 2025, WWE's Los Garza won the AAA World Tag Team Championship at Triplemanía Regia III, marking the first AAA championship and the third non-WWE championship in total to be won by wrestlers under WWE contract. WWE would later acquire AAA in August 2025.

== Major events ==
Each year AAA promotes a number of signature events: some shown as pay-per-view or streaming events and others presented as television specials. The annual shows, shown in order of occurrence during each year, include:

Event	Most recent date	Notes
Rey de Reyes	March 14–28, 2026	A tournament held traditionally in the early part of the year.
Verano de Escándalo	July 25 – August 8, 2026	Annual end of the summer event.
Triplemanía	September 11–13, 2026	Traditionally AAA's biggest show of the year.
Worlds Collide	September 26, 2026	A show themed around interpromotional matches between AAA and WWE wrestlers; is held multiple times a year.
Antonio Peña Memorial Show/Héroes Inmortales	October 25, 2025	Typically hosts the Copa Antonio Peña tournament in memory of AAA's founder Antonio Peña; held around the anniversary of Peña's death. Renamed from the Antonio Peña Memorial Show to Héroes Inmortales in 2009.
Guerra de Titanes	December 20, 2025	AAA's end-of-year show, usually held in November or December. Was held in January in 2016, 2017, and 2018.

== Championships ==
Initially, AAA had few restrictions on the number of championships it promoted, often allowing wrestlers to defend titles from other promotions; such as the Universal Wrestling Association. This long-standing practice ended in December 2008, after the promotion announced it would no longer recognize or promote any non-AAA title.

=== Current championships ===
As of November 18, 2026.

=== Singles ===
Championship	Current champion(s)	Reign	Date won	Days held	Location	Notes	Ref.
AAA Mega Championship	El Grande Americano	1	September 13, 2026	66+	Azcapotzalco, Mexico City, Mexico	Defeated Dominik Mysterio in a No Disqualification match at Night 2 of Triplemanía 34.	
AAA Reina de Reinas Championship	La Catalina	1	September 13, 2026	66	Azcapotzalco, Mexico City, Mexico	Defeated Flammer at Night 2 of Triplemanía 34.	
AAA Latin American Championship	La Parka	1	August 30, 2026	80	Edinburg, Texas, U.S.	Defeated Damian Priest, El Fiscal, and El Hijo de Dr. Wagner Jr. in the fatal four-way tournament final to win the vacant title at Ola de Calor.	
AAA World Cruiserweight Championship	Rey Fénix	2	May 30, 2026	172	Monterrey, Nuevo León, Mexico	Defeated Laredo Kid at Noche de Los Grandes.	

=== Team ===
Championship	Current champion(s)	Reign	Date won	Days held	Location	Notes	Ref.
AAA World Tag Team Championship	The Wagner Brothers (El Hijo de Dr. Wagner Jr. and Galeno)	1	September 13, 2026	66+	Azcapotzalco, Mexico City, Mexico	Defeated The War Raiders (Erik and Ivar) at Night 2 of Triplemanía 34. This was an open challenge.	
AAA World Mixed Tag Team Championship	Big Mami and Niño Hamburguesa	2	November 14, 2026	4	Mexico City, Mexico	Defeated La Hiedra and Laredo Kid at a taping of Lucha Libre AAA.	
AAA World Trios Championship	Los Perros del Mal (Daga, Angel, and Berto (not pictured)	1	September 11, 2026	68	Paradise, Nevada, U.S.	Defeated Los Psycho Circus (Dave the Clown, Murder Clown, Panic Clown, and Psycho Clown) at Night 1 of Triplemanía 34; Dave, Murder, and Psycho defended the titles.	

=== Retired championships ===
Championship was not officially retired

#	Championship	Final champion(s)	Date created	Date retired	Notes
1	AAA Americas Heavyweight Championship	Sangre Chicana	February 2, 1996	2006	
2	AAA Americas Trios Championship	Los Villanos (Villano III, IV, and V)	March 8, 1996	1997	
3	AAA Americas Welterweight Championship	Zorro (Note: Not the same wrestler as Jesús Cristóbal Martínez Rodriguez who most famously wrestled as El Zorro in AAA.)	Unknown	1990s	
4	AAA Campeón de Campeones Championship	Cibernético	June 15, 1996	2005	
5	AAA Fusión Championship	El Hijo del Fantasma	November 3, 2012	August 17, 2014	
6	AAA Mascot Tag Team Championship	El Alebrije and Cuije	December 13, 2002	April 7, 2009	Continued to be used on the independent circuit until 2011.
7	AAA Northern Light Heavyweight Championship	Lemús Jr.	Before November 18, 2013	Unknown	No title defense since March 26, 2018.
8	AAA Northern Middleweight Championship	The Tigger	Before July 3, 2006	Unknown	No title defense since December 7, 2019.
9	AAA Northern Tag Team Championship	La División del Norte (Kuas Extrem and Snaiper)	Before February 15, 2004	Unknown	No title defense since 2017.
10	AAA Northern Women's Championship	La Hiedra	Before November 17, 2014	Unknown	No subsequent title defense.
11	AAA Parejas Increibles Tag Team Championship	Cibernético and Konnan	June 12, 2010	Unknown	No title defense since 2010. One-half of the reigning champions Konnan retired from wrestling in 2013.
12	AAA World Mini-Estrella Championship	Dinastía	September 14, 2008	Unknown	No title defense since November 5, 2022.
13	GPCW SUPER-X Monster Championship	La Parka	December 10, 2004	September 16, 2007	Continues to be used by Super X Grand Prix Championship Wrestling.
14	IWAS World Heavyweight Championship	Konnan	January 26, 1996	Unknown	No title defense since 1999 when AAA split from International Wrestling All-Stars.
15	IWAS World Light Heavyweight Championship	Máscara Sagrada Jr.	January 31, 1996	1999	Continued to be used on the independent circuit until the 2000s.
16	IWAS World Tag Team Championship	Konnan and Rey Misterio Jr.	Before August 17, 1996	Unknown	No title defense since 1999 when AAA split from International Wrestling All-Stars.
17	IWC World Heavyweight Championship	El Mesias	November 13, 1993	September 16, 2007	
18	IWC World Middleweight Championship	Rey Misterio	August 29, 1993	Unknown	No title defense since 1995 when AAA split from the International Wrestling Company.
19	IWC World Minis Championship	Super Muñequito	March 12, 1994	July 8, 1995	
20	La Leyenda Azul Blue Demon Championship	Arez	December 28, 2022	Unknown	No title defense have since March 6, 2024 when Arez departed AAA.
21	LLL Mini-Estrellas Championship	Mascarita Sagrada	2000s	2000s	
22	Marvel Lucha Libre Championship	Aracno	December 28, 2022	Unknown	No title defense after Aracno's title win as AAA's working agreement with Marvel Comics ended.
23	Mexican National Atómicos Championship	Chessman and Los Psycho Circus (Killer Clown, Psycho Clown, and Zombie Clown)	August 9, 1996	January 24, 2009	
24	Mexican National Cruiserweight Championship	La Parka	1955	2007	
25	Mexican National Heavyweight Championship	Charly Manson	1926	December 2008	Continues to be used by Consejo Mundial de Lucha Libre.
26	Mexican National Middleweight Championship	Octagón	1933	December 2008	Continues to be used by Consejo Mundial de Lucha Libre.
27	Mexican National Mini-Estrella Championship	Mascarita Sagrada 2000	1992	June 21, 2007	
28	Mexican National Tag Team Championship	Octagón and La Parka	June 14, 1957	December 25, 2011	Continues to be used by Consejo Mundial de Lucha Libre.
29	Mexican National Trios Championship	Blue Panther, Fuerza Guerrera, and El Signo	March 10, 1985	2001	Continues to be used by Consejo Mundial de Lucha Libre.
30	Mexican National Welterweight Championship	El Torero	June 17, 1934	1998	Continues to be used by Consejo Mundial de Lucha Libre.
31	Mexican National Women's Championship	Lady Apache	November 13, 1983	December 8, 2008	Continues to be used by Consejo Mundial de Lucha Libre.
32	Mexican National Women's Tag Team Championship	La Rosa and La Sirenita	April 10, 1990	1997	Continues to be used by Consejo Mundial de Lucha Libre.
33	UWA World Heavyweight Championship	Dr. Wagner Jr.	August 15, 1977	October 7, 2011	
34	UWA World Light Heavyweight Championship	Chessman	November 25, 1975	September 16, 2007	Continues to be used by Professional Wrestling Just Tap Out.

=== Other accomplishments ===
Accomplishment	Type	Latest winner	Date won
Rey de Reyes	Tournament featuring four-way matches for the Rey de Reyes sword	El Grande Americano	March 14, 2026
Copa Bardahl	Gauntlet-style battle royal held at Triplemanía and sponsored by Bardahl; winner awarded the Bardahl Cup trophy	Omos	September 13, 2026
Copa Antonio Peña	A gauntlet match held in tribute to AAA founder Antonio Peña; winner awarded the Antonio Peña Cup trophy	Chik Tormenta	October 6, 2024
Copa Triplemanía	Gauntlet-style battle royal held at Triplemanía; winner(s) awarded the Triplemanía Cup trophy	Team The Crash (D'Luxe, Noisy Boy, and Destiny)	June 15, 2024
Lucha Libre World Cup	International trios or tag team tournament; winners awarded the honorary Lucha Libre World Cup championship belts	Men's Division: Team Mexico (Taurus, Pentagón Jr., and Laredo Kid); Women's Division: Team United States (Deonna Purrazzo, Kamille, and Jordynne Grace)	March 19, 2023
Copa Triplemanía Femenil	Gauntlet-style battle royal featuring women's wrestlers and exóticos; winner awarded the Triplemanía Cup trophy	Lady Shani	December 12, 2020

== See also ==
- AAA Hall of Fame
- List of former Lucha Libre AAA Worldwide personnel
- List of Lucha Libre AAA Worldwide personnel
- List of Lucha Libre AAA Worldwide tournaments
- List of professional wrestling promotions in Mexico
- Lucha Libre AAA (TV program)
