= MLW Super Series (2022) =

2022 Major League Wrestling and Lucha Libre AAA Worldwide event

- Promotion(s): Major League Wrestling; Lucha Libre AAA World Wide; Dragon Gate
- Date: September 18, 2022
- City: Norcross, Georgia
- Venue: Space Events Center

Event chronology
← Previous
- Verano de Escándalo (AAA)
- Fury Road (MLW)
Next →
- Noche de Campeones (AAA)
- Fightland (MLW)

Super Series chronology
← Previous; AAA vs MLW	Next → 2023

Super Series (2022) was a professional wrestling supercard event produced by Major League Wrestling (MLW), in conjunction with Lucha Libre AAA Worldwide (AAA) and Dragon Gate. It took place on September 18, 2022, at the Space Events Center in Norcross, Georgia. It was the second event in the MLW Super Series chronology, following AAA vs MLW in 2020, and served as a television taping for MLW Fusion.

== Production ==
=== Background ===
Other on-screen personnel
Role:	Name:
Commentators	Joe Dombrowski
Commentators	Rich Bocchini

MLW.com revealed on January 2, 2021, that discussions were being had to promote a second Super Series event. Over a year later on July 19, 2022, MLW.com revealed plans to hold a 2022 Super Series event with other promotions. On July 22, 2022, the event was officially announced to be taking place on September 18, with MLW making its Atlanta metropolitan area debut at the Space Event Center in Norcross, Georgia. Promotions participating in the event include Lucha Libre AAA Worldwide (AAA) and Dragon Gate.

=== Storylines ===
The show featured several professional wrestling matches that resulted from scripted storylines, where wrestlers portray villains, heroes, or less distinguishable characters in the scripted events that build tension and culminate in a wrestling match or series of matches.

Several talent from MLW's partners, as well as free agents via MLW's "Open Door" Policy, made appearances at the event, including Dragon Gate's SB Kento, and free agent Willie Mack.

At Battle Riot IV, MLW World Heavyweight Champion Alexander Hammerstone was originally supposed to defend the title against Bandido, but an injury sustained by the latter at Triplemanía XXX: Tijuana forced Bandido to withdraw. Hammerstone would retain his title against Richard Holliday in a falls count anywhere match at the event. On August 8, MLW announced that Bandido will get his title match with Hammerstone at Super Series.

On August 16, MLW announced that Dragon Gate's Shun Skywalker would take part at the Super Series. On August 30, Skywalker released a video calling out MLW World Middleweight Champion Myron Reed. Two days later, Reed released a response accepting the challenge, and a match for the title was made official for the event.

== Results ==
No.	Results	Stipulations	Times
1	Lady Flammer defeated Lady Shani, La Hiedra, and Reina Dorada by pinfall	Four-way match to determine the #1 contender to the MLW World Women's Featherweight Championship	8:04
2	Shun Skywalker (with Davey Richards) defeated Myron Reed (c) by pinfall	Singles match for the MLW World Middleweight Championship	10:59
3	The Samoan SWAT Team (Lance Anoa'i and Juicy Finau) (with Jacob Fatu) defeated La Anexion (Mark Davidson and Angel Fashion) by pinfall	Tag team match	4:23
4	Star Roger defeated Cosmos by pinfall	Singles match	10:45
5	Davey Richards (c) defeated SB Kento by submission	Singles match for the MLW National Openweight Championship	10:28
6	Alex Kane (with Myron Reed, Suge D, Bobby Flaco, Jose Manuel, and Shoota Gabe) defeated D3 by pinfall	$2,250 Peach State Prize Fight Invitational; Had D3 lasted 5 minutes with Kane, he would have won $2,250	2:03
7	Alexander Hammerstone (c) defeated Bandido by pinfall	Singles match for the MLW World Heavyweight Championship	16:04
8	Mance Warner defeated Mads Krügger	Tables match	7:38
9	EJ Nduka defeated Sultan del Aire by pinfall	Singles match	2:54
10	Jacob Fatu defeated Willie Mack by pinfall	Singles match	11:00
11	Taya Valkyrie (c) defeated Lady Flammer by pinfall	Singles match for the MLW World Women's Featherweight Championship	8:48
12	Laredo Kid, Komander, and Microman defeated Mini Abismo Negro, Gino Medina, and Taurus (with Dr. Dax) by pinfall	Loser Leaves Town Trios match Since Microman pinned Medina, Medina was forced to leave MLW; had Microman been pinned or submitted, he would have been forced to leave.	17:50
(c) / – the champion(s) heading into the match
