= Albert Ramírez =

Venezuelan boxer (born 1992)

Personal information
- Born: Albert Ramón Ramírez Duran; 7 May 1992 (age 34) El Vigia, Venezuela
- Height: 5 ft 11 1/2 in (182 cm)
- Weight: Light heavyweight; Cruiserweight

Boxing career
- Reach: 75 in (191 cm)
- Stance: Southpaw

Boxing record
- Total fights: 23
- Wins: 23
- Win by KO: 19
Medal record
Men's amateur boxing
Representing Venezuela
Pan American Games
Silver medal – second place	Toronto 2015	Light heavyweight

Albert Ramón Ramírez Durán (born 7 May 1992), known as Albert Ramírez, is a Venezuelan professional boxer. He has held the WBA interim light-heavyweight title since August 2025.

== Career ==
=== Amateur career ===
As an amateur he competed in the light heavyweight division at the 2016 Summer Olympics.

Ramírez had a distinguished amateur career, competing primarily in the light-heavyweight division. He represented Venezuela at the 2015 Pan American Games in Toronto, where he secured a bronze medal after a highly competitive tournament. Later that year, he achieved his biggest amateur milestone by winning the gold medal at the 2015 Pan American Boxing Championships.

In 2016, Ramírez qualified for the Summer Olympics in Rio de Janeiro. Competing in the light-heavyweight bracket, he won his opening bout against Russian boxer Petr Khamukov but was subsequently eliminated in the Round of 16 by Algeria's Abdelhafid Benchabla.

=== Professional career ===
Ramírez turned professional in 2018 and compiled a record of 21–0 before defeating Jerome Pampellone by seventh round technical knockout to win the WBA interim light-heavyweight title at Benina Martyrs Stadium in Benghazi, Libya, on 8 August 2025.

Ramirez was scheduled to make the first defense of his title against Lerrone Richards at Montreal Casino in Montreal, Canada, on 5 February 2026. However, the fight was cancelled when Ramírez was hospitalised due to appendicitis two days before the event. The bout was rescheduled to take place at the same venue on 4 June 2026. Ramírez won by split decision with the judges' scorecards reading 115–113, 115–113 and 112–116.

On June 4, 2026, Ramírez made his first successful title defense against British challenger Lerrone Richards at the Casino de Montréal in Montreal, Canada. In a highly tactical and grueling contest, Ramírez struggled early with Richards' elusive movement and frequent clinching, but pushed the pace in the later rounds. He managed to secure a close split decision victory, with two judges scoring the bout 115–113 in his favor, while the third had it 116–112 for Richards. Following the bout, Richards' promotional team, Boxxer, expressed strong disagreement with the official scores and announced their intention to file a formal appeal with the WBA.

== Professional boxing record ==
23 fights	23 wins	0 losses
By knockout	19	0
By decision	4	0

No.	Result	Record	Opponent	Type	Round, time	Date	Location	Notes
23	Win	23–0	Lerrone Richards	SD	12	4 Jun 2026	Montreal Casino, Montreal, Canada	Retained WBA interim light-heavyweight title
22	Win	22–0	Jerome Pampellone	TKO	7 (12), 1:19	8 Aug 2025	Benina Martyrs Stadium, Benghazi, Libya	Won vacant WBA interim light-heavyweight title
21	Win	21–0	Michael Alan Flannery	TKO	2 (10), 1:09	5 Jun 2025	Montreal Casino, Montreal, Canada	
20	Win	20–0	Marko Calic	TKO	3 (10), 2:10	6 Feb 2025	Montreal Casino, Montreal, Canada	
19	Win	19–0	Adam Deines	RTD	7 (10), 2:03	24 Aug 2024	Polideportivo José María Vargas, La Guaira, Venezuela	
18	Win	18–0	Artur Ziyatdinov	UD	10	25 Jan 2024	Montreal Casino, Montreal, Canada	Won vacant WBA International light-heavyweight title
17	Win	17–0	Lenin Castillo	UD	10	23 Sep 2023	Chapiteau de l'Espace Fontvieille, Fontvieille, Monaco	
16	Win	16–0	Ricardo Luna	TKO	4 (10), 0:16	5 May 2023	Hotel Holiday Inn, Cuernavaca, Mexico	
15	Win	15–0	Jacob Dickson	TKO	1 (10), 2:52	22 Jan 2023	Casino de Deauville, Deauville, France	Won vacant WBO Global cruiserweight title
14	Win	14–0	Braian Nahuel Suarez	KO	1 (10), 2:31	24 Jun 2022	Casino Buenos Aires, Buenos Aires, Argentina	Won vacant WBA Continental Americas light-heavyweight title
13	Win	13–0	Victor Hugo Exner	KO	3 (10), 1:46	8 Apr 2022	Cava Domecq, Aguascalientes, Mexico	Won vacant WBC FECARBOX light-heavyweight title
12	Win	12–0	Facundo Nicolas Galovar	UD	10	11 Mar 2022	Casino Buenos Aires, Buenos Aires, Argentina	
11	Win	11–0	Juan Carlos Raygosa	TKO	3 (8), 2:04	11 Feb 2022	Arena Alcalde, Guadalajara, Mexico	
10	Win	10–0	Varazdat Chernikov	TKO	3 (6), 2:29	1 Apr 2021	Basket Hall, Krasnodar, Russia	
9	Win	9–0	Juan Carlos Parra Rodriguez	KO	1 (8), 2:59	12 Oct 2019	La Casa de los Zonkeys, Tijuana, Mexico	
8	Win	8–0	Jaudiel Zepeda	TKO	1 (6), 1:46	17 Aug 2019	Auditorio Municipal, Tijuana, Mexico	
7	Win	7–0	Francisco Villanueva	TKO	3 (8), 2:23	11 Jun 2019	Ahualulco del Mercado, Jalisco, Mexico	
6	Win	6–0	Isaias Ortega	TKO	1 (6), 0:51	22 Dec 2018	Auditorio Municipal, Tijuana, Mexico	
5	Win	5–0	Juan Jose Rosales	KO	5 (6), 0:36	6 Oct 2018	Gasmart Stadium, Tijuana, Mexico	
4	Win	4–0	Carlos Humberto Chavez	TKO	6 (6), 0:47	1 Sep 2018	Auditorio Municipal, Tijuana, Mexico	
3	Win	3–0	Juan Carlos Moreno	TKO	1 (4), 1:43	28 Jul 2018	Auditorio Municipal, Tijuana, Mexico	
2	Win	2–0	Julio Alcantar Majors	TKO	1 (4), 2:24	14 Jul 2018	Bar La Oficina, Tijuana, Mexico	
1	Win	1–0	Javier Rivera Meza	KO	1 (4), 1:19	9 Jun 2018	Auditorio Municipal, Tijuana, Mexico	

== See also ==
- List of male boxers
- List of southpaw stance boxers

Sporting positions
Regional boxing titles
Vacant Title last held by Joaquin Murrieta Lucio	WBC FECARBOX light-heavyweight champion April 8, 2022 – 2023; Vacated	Vacant Title next held by Yunior Menendez
New title	WBA Continental Americas light-heavyweight champion June 24, 2022 – August 8, 2025; Won world title	Vacant Title next held by Deon Nicholson
Vacant Title last held by David Light	WBO Global cruiserweight champion January 22, 2023 – 2023; Vacated	Vacant Title next held by Ali Baloyev
Vacant Title last held by Craig Richards	WBA International light-heavyweight champion January 25, 2024 – August 8, 2025; Won world title	Vacant
World boxing titles
Vacant Title last held by Robin Krasniqi	WBA light-heavyweight champion Interim title August 8, 2025 – present	Incumbent
