= AAA vs MLW =

Mexican professional wrestling show

- Promotional poster featuring various MLW wrestlers and AAA luchadores
- Promotions: Lucha Libre AAA Worldwide; Major League Wrestling; Promociones EMW
- Date: March 13, 2020 (Aired April 11, 2020 – May 9, 2020)
- City: Tijuana, Baja California, Mexico
- Venue: Auditorio Fausto Gutierrez

Event chronology
← Previous
- Guerra de Titanes (AAA)
- Fightland (MLW)
Next →
- Triplemanía XXVIII (AAA)
- Kings of Colosseum (MLW)

Super Series chronology
← Previous —	Next → MLW Super Series (2022)

AAA vs MLW (also known as MLW x AAA and AAA vs. MLW Super Series) was a professional wrestling supercard event co-produced by the U.S-based Major League Wrestling (MLW) and the Mexico-based Lucha Libre AAA Worldwide (AAA), in partnership with Promociones EMW. It was held at Auditorio Fausto Gutierrez in Tijuana, Baja California, Mexico on March 13, 2020.

It was the inaugural event in the MLW Super Series chronology, and it was taped for future episodes of MLW Fusion; these would be the final episodes to air before the promotion went on hiatus due to the COVID-19 pandemic.

== Production ==
=== Background ===
In August 2018, Major League Wrestling (MLW) announced that they had started a working agreement with Mexican-based promotion Lucha Libre AAA Worldwide (AAA). Nearly two years later on February 5, 2020, MLW announced that it would be holding its first co-promoted event with AAA on March 13, held in conjunction with AAA's local Tijuana partner Promociones EMW. This marked the second MLW event promoted in Mexico, following the Crash/Major League Wrestling show held on October 5, 2019.

=== Storylines ===
AAA vs MLW featured nine professional wrestling matches scripted by MLW and AAA featuring wrestlers involved in scripted feuds. The wrestlers portrayed either heels (referred to as rudos in Mexico, those that play the part of the "bad guys") or faces (técnicos in Mexico, the "good guy" characters) as they performed.

== Results ==
No.	Results	Stipulations	Times
1	El Poder Del Norte (Tito Santana, Carta Brava Jr., and Mocho Cota Jr.) defeated Black Destiny, Fantastick, and Rayo Star (with Viva Van)	Trios match Aired May 2, 2020	7:37
2	Jinetes del Aire (El Hijo del Vikingo, Octagón Jr. and Myzteziz Jr.) (c) defeated Injustice (Myron Reed, Kotto Brazil and Jordan Oliver)	Trios match for the AAA World Trios Championship; Aired May 2, 2020	13:46
3	Team Filthy (Dominic Garrini and Tom Lawlor) defeated Xtreme Tiger and Puma King	Tag team match Aired April 18, 2020	11:24
4	Averno defeated Douglas James	Singles match Aired April 18, 2020	6:10
5	Richard Holliday (c) defeated Chessman	Singles match for the Caribbean Heavyweight Championship; Aired April 25, 2020	6:31
6	Alexander Hammerstone (c) defeated Laredo Kid	Singles match for the MLW National Openweight Championship; Aired April 11, 2020	10:40
7	New Era Hart Foundation (Davey Boy Smith Jr. and Brian Pillman Jr.) defeated Los Mercenarios (Texano Jr. and Rey Escorpión)	Tag team match Aired April 25, 2020	10:27
8	Pagano and Mortiz defeated Savio Vega and Mance Warner	Tag team Lucha Extrema match Aired April 11, 2020	16:00
9	La Familia Real (L.A. Park, El Hijo de L.A. Park, and L.A. Park Jr.) defeated Psycho Clown, Nicho el Millonario, and Niño Hamburguesa	No Disqualification trios match Aired May 9, 2020	22:05
(c) / – the champion(s) heading into the match

== See also ==
- The Crash/Major League Wrestling show
- 2020 in professional wrestling
