= List of former Lucha Libre AAA Worldwide personnel =

Former personnel of Lucha Libre AAA Worldwide

Lucha Libre AAA Worldwide (AAA) is a professional wrestling promotion based in Mexico City. Former employees in AAA consist of professional wrestlers, managers, play-by-play and color commentators, announcers, interviewers, and referees.

== List of AAA alumni ==
†	Indicates person is deceased

=== Male wrestlers ===
Ring name(s)	Birth name	Tenure
Abismo Negro †	Andrés Alejandro Palomeque González	1992–2009
Abyss	Christopher Joseph Parks	2004–2012
A.J. Styles	Allen Neal Jones	2006; 2011–2013
Alan Stone / Hollywood	Alan Stone	1996; 2004–2012
Alberto El Patrón / Dos Caras Jr. / El Patrón Alberto	José Alberto Rodríguez	2000–2002; 2014–2015
Alex Koslov	Alex Sherman	2008–2010
Andres Maroñas	Andres Maroñas	1992–2019
Andrew Everett	Andrew Everett Wenkel	2017; 2018
Angélico	Adam Bridle	2011; 2013–2017
Antonio Peña †	Antonio Peña Herrada	1992–2006
Art Barr †	Arthur Leon Barr	1993–1994
Atsushi Aoki †	Atsushi Aoki	2010
Averno	Renato Ruíz Cortes	2014–2021
Bengala (II)	Undisclosed (Note: In lucha libre the true identity, birth name etc. of masked wrestlers are kept secret from the general public. News does not report nor speculate on real names even if they may be able to find out, out of respect for the Lucha Libre traditions.)	2016–2019
Bandido	Undisclosed	2018
Billy Boy / Billy el Malo	José Roberto Islas García	2001–2013
Blue Panther	Genaro Vázquez Nevarez	1992-1997
Bobby Lashley	Franklin Roberto Lashley	2008; 2017
Brazo de Plata / Super Porky †	José Alvarado Nieves	2006–2009
Bryan Danielson	Bryan Lloyd Danielson	2008
Canek	Felipe Estrada	1996–2003; 2013; 2015
Charly Manson	Jesús Luna Pozos	1998–2001; 2002–2011
Cibernético	Octavio López Arreola	1995–2008; 2009–2015
Cien Caras	Carmelo Reyes González	1992–1996
Cuije	Undisclosed	1998–2009
Dark Cuervo	Jaime Ignacio Tirado Correa	2001–2018
Dark Espiritu	Undisclosed	2001–2014
Dark Scoria	José Ibarra	2001–2018
Dark Ozz	Marcos Tinajero	2001-2014
DJZ	Michael Paris	2017; 2018
Dr. Wagner Jr. / Rey Wagner	Juan Manuel González Barrón	2009–2013; 2014–2020
Eddie Guerrero †	Eduardo Gory Guerrero	1993–1994
Electroshock	Edgar Luna Pozos	1997–2016; 2018
Extreme Tiger	Undisclosed	2006–2012
Fuerza Guerrera	Undisclosed	1992–2007
Garza Jr.	Humberto Solano	2015–2017
Go Shiozaki	Go Shiozaki	2010
Gorgeous George III	Robert Kellum	1997
Gran Apache / El Apache †	Mario Balbuena González	1995-2017
Halloween	Leonardo Carrera Gómez	2010–2012; 2016–2017
Heavy Metal	Erick Francisco Casas Ruiz	1992–2000; 2004; 2011–2013
Héctor Garza †	Héctor Solano Segura	1999-2004; 2012
Hernandez	Shawn Hernandez	2006; 2010; 2017–2018
El Hijo del Fantasma	Jorge Luis Alcantar	2013–2019
El Hijo del Santo	Jorge Guzmán	1992-1995; 2009
El Intocable	René Gómez Espinoza	1997–2008
Jake Roberts	Aurelian Jake Smith Jr.	1993–1994
James Storm	James Allen Cox	2010
Jerry Estrada	Gerardo Hernández Estrada	1992–1997; 1998–2003
Johnny Mundo / Johnny Superstar / Johnny Caballero / Johnny Hardy	John Randall Hennigan	2015–2018; 2022
Juventud Guerrera	Eduardo Aníbal González Hernández	2006–2008; 2012–2014; 2018
Kenzo Suzuki	Kenzo Suzuki	2007–2010; 2015
Kevin Kross / Killer Kross	Kevin Kesar	2017–2020
Kurt Angle	Kurt Steven Angle	2012
La Parka †	Jesús Alfonso Huerta Escoboza	1995–2019
Latin Lover	Victor Manuel Resendiz Ruiz	1994–2003; 2009–2010
La Máscara	Felipe de Jesús Alvarado Mendoza	2018-2019
Marco Corleone	Mark Robert Jindrak	2009–2010
Máscara Año 2000	Jesús Reyes González	1992–1994
Máscara Año 2000 Jr.	Ángel Omar Reyes Franco	2010–2012
Máscara Sagrada	Undisclosed	1992-1997
Máscara Sagrada II / El Alebrije	Undisclosed	1997–2009
Máximo	José Christian Alvarado Ruiz	2018–2021
Mr. Anderson	Kenneth Anderson	2010; 2015
Mr. Águila	José Delgado Saldaña	2001–2008
Mr. Niebla †	Efrén Tiburcio Márquez	2007-2008
Muerte Cibernética / El Mesías	Gilbert Cosme	2006-2018
Myzteziz	Luis Ignacio Urive Alvirde	2014–2015
Octagón	Juan Escalera	1992–2014
Perro Aguayo †	Pedro Aguayo Damián	1992–1996; 2012
Perro Aguayo Jr. †	Pedro Aguayo Ramírez	1993–2003; 2010–2015
Pirata Morgan	Pedro Ortiz Villanueva	1995–2009
Psicosis / Nicho el Millonario	Dionicio Castellanos Torres	1994; 2007-2014; 2016–2017
Rey Misterio †	Miguel Ángel López Díaz	1994
Rob Van Dam	Rob Szatkowski	2011
Robert Roode	James Allen Cox	2010
Rocky Romero	John R. Rivera	2008–2010
Ron Killings	Ronald Aaron Killings	2007
Samoa Joe	Nuufolau Joel Seanoa	2006; 2011
Sangre Chicana	Andrés Durán Reyes	1992–2004
Scott Steiner	Scott Carl Rechsteiner	2008
Silver King / Silver Cain †	Cesar Cuauhtémoc González Barrón	2008–2014
Super Crazy	Francisco Islas Rueda	2010–2011
Super Caló	Rafael García	1992–1995; 2007–2008
Taiji Ishimori	Taiji Ishimori	2006–2007; 2010; 2015–2016
Texano Jr.	Juan Aguilar Leos	2011–2021
Alan Stone / Hollywood	Alan Stone	1996; 2004–2012
Volador	Ramón Ibarra Banda	1992–1998
Último Gladiador	Gerardo Campos Poza	2008–2018
Universo 2000 †	Andrés Reyes González	1992–1995
Villano III †	Arturo Díaz Mendoza	1995–1998; 2015
Villano IV	Tomas Díaz Mendoza	1995–1998; 2013–2016
Villano V †	Raymundo Díaz Mendoza Jr.	1995–1998; 2015
X-Fly	Juan Francisco Domínguez	1995–1997; 2010–2012
X-Pac	Sean Michael Waltman	2007–2008
El Zorro	Jesús Cristóbal Martínez Rodriguez	2000–2017

=== Female wrestlers ===
Ring name(s)	Birth name	Tenure
Aja Kong	Erika Shishido	2016
Allie	Laura Dennis	2016
Christina Von Eerie	Christina Maria Kardooni	2010
Cynthia Moreno	Flavia Antonia Moreno León	1997–2010
La Diabólica	Undisclosed	2004–2008
Io Shirai	Masami Odate	2012
Angelina Love	Lauren Ann Williams	2007; 2011
Goya Kong	Gloria Alvarado Nava	2015–2019
Jennifer Blake / Jennifer Blade	Jennifer Ykema	2009–2014
K. C. Spinelli	Natalie Harrison	2016
Lady Apache	Sandra González Calderón	1999–2003; 2016
LuFisto	Genevieve Goulet	2013
Martha Villalobos	Martha García Mejía	2003–2005
Mickie James	Mickie Laree James	2010–2011
Mio Shirai	Mio Shirai	2012
Miss Janeth	Janet Fragoso Alonso	1998–2007
Natsu Sumire	Sumire Natsu	2016; 2017
Rain	Bonnie Maxon	2009–2010
Rosemary	Holly Letkeman	2017
Santana Garrett	Santana Garrett	2016
Scarlett Bordeaux	Elizabeth Chihaia	2018–2019
Taya Valkyrie	Kira Renée Forster	2012–2017; 2018–2021
Tiffany	Xóchitl Leyva Sánchez	1997—2010
Velvet Sky	Jamie Lynn Szantyr	2011
Yuki Miyazaki	Yuki Miyazaki	2016
Xóchitl Hamada	Xóchitl Guadalupe Hamada Villarreal	1997—2001

== See also ==
- List of Lucha Libre AAA Worldwide personnel
- List of professional wrestlers
