= Najee Lopez =

Puerto Rican boxer (born 1999)

Personal information
- Nickname: Chino
- Born: 20 September 1999 (age 26) Atlanta, Georgia, U. S.
- Height: 6 ft 2 in (1.88 m)
- Weight: Light-heavyweight

Boxing career
- Stance: Orthodox

Boxing record
- Total fights: 17
- Wins: 17
- Win by KO: 14

Najee Lopez (born 20 September 1999) is an American professional boxer. He has held the WBO Latino light-heavyweight title since March 2026.

== Career ==
Lopez turned professional after having over 200 amateur fights. In his second pro-fight he knocked out Anthony Hollaway in the second round at Buckhead Fight Club in his hometown of Atlanta, Georgia, on 19 November 2021.

He defeated Marcos Escudero by majority decision at Whitesands Events Center in Plant City, Florida, on 28 February 2024. In his next fight, Lopez overcame a knockdown to defeat Steven Sumpter via unanimous decision at ProBox TV Events Center in Plant City, Florida, on 10 July 2024.

Lopez defeated Manuel Gallegos by eighth round technical knockout at Osceola Heritage in Kissimmee, Florida, on 13 March 2026 to win the vacant WBO Latino light-heavyweight and WBA Continental Americas titles.

He successfully defended the WBO Latino light-heavyweight title with a ninth round knockout win over the previously unbeaten Juan Carlos Carrillo at the USC Galen Center in Los Angeles, California.

== Professional boxing record ==
17 fights	17 wins	0 losses
By knockout	14	0
By decision	3	0

No.	Result	Record	Opponent	Type	Round, time	Date	Location	Notes
17	Win	17–0	(Colombia) Juan Carlos Carrillo	KO	9 (10), 1:33	29 Aug 2026	(United States) USC Galen Center, Los Angeles, California, U.S.	Retained WBO Latino light-heavyweight title
16	Win	16–0	(Mexico) Manuel Gallegos	TKO	8 (10), 2:41	13 Mar 2026	(United States) Oscecola Heritage Park, Kissimmee, Florida, U.S.	Won vacant WBO Latino light-heavyweight and WBA Continental Americas titles
15	Win	15–0	(United States) Kelvin Henderson	TKO	5 (10), 0:55	27 Sept 2025	(United States) Oscecola Heritage Park, Kissimmee, Florida, U.S.	
14	Win	14–0	(United States) Juan Gerardo Osuna	TKO	2 (10), 2:07	10 May 2025	(United States) Silver Spurs Arena, Kissimmee, Florida, U.S.	
13	Win	13–0	(Dominican Republic) Lenin Castillo	TKO	6 (10), 2:36	24 Jan 2025	(United States) ProBox TV Events Center, Plant City, Florida, U.S.	
12	Win	12–0	(Ecuador) Ismael Ocles	KO	3 (8), 0:38	16 Oct 2024	(United States) ProBox TV Events Center, Plant City, Florida, U.S.	
11	Win	11–0	(United States) Steven Sumpter	UD	8	10 Jul 2024	(United States) ProBox TV Events Center, Plant City, Florida, U.S.	
10	Win	10–0	(Argentina) Marcos Escudero	MD	10	28 Feb 2024	(United States) Whitesands Events Center, Plant City, Florida, U.S.	
9	Win	9–0	(Cuba) Yildo Depestre	KO	3 (8), 0:48	13 Dec 2023	(United States) Whitesands Events Center, Plant City, Florida, U.S.	
8	Win	8–0	(United States) Khainell Wheeler	TKO	4 (8), 2:19	18 Oct 2023	(United States) Whitesands Events Center, Plant City, Florida, U.S.	
7	Win	7–0	(United States) Christopher Brooker	KO	1 (6), 0:48	12 Jul 2023	(United States) Whitesands Events Center, Plant City, Florida, U.S.	
6	Win	6–0	(Argentina) Cristian Fabian Rios	UD	6	22 Feb 2023	(United States) Whitesands Events Center, Plant City, Florida, U.S.	
5	Win	5–0	(Colombia) Jeysson Monroy	TKO	3 (6), 1:45	24 Jun 2022	(United States) Osceola Heritage Park, Kissimmee, Florida, U.S.	
4	Win	4–0	(United States) Anthony Stewart	TKO	4 (6), 2:39	25 Mar 2022	(United States) Whitesands Events Center, Plant City, Florida, U.S.	
3	Win	3–0	(Colombia) Alex Theran	TKO	2 (6), 0:33	25 Feb 2022	(United States) Whitesands Events Center, Plant City, Florida, U.S.	
2	Win	2–0	(United States) Anthony Hollaway	KO	2 (4), 0:29	19 Nov 2021	(United States) Buckhead Fight Club, Atlanta, Georgia, U.S.	
1	Win	1–0	(United States) Wallace Nass Silva	TKO	1 (4), 0:29	27 Aug 2021	(United States) Whitesands Events Center, Plant City, Florida, U.S.	
