= Steven Nelson (boxer) =

American boxer

Personal information
- Nickname: So Cold
- Born: June 4, 1988 (age 38)
- Height: 5 ft 10 in (178 cm)
- Weight: Super middleweight; Light heavyweight

Boxing career
- Reach: 75 1/2 in (192 cm)
- Stance: Orthodox

Boxing record
- Total fights: 22
- Wins: 20
- Win by KO: 16
- Losses: 2

Steven Nelson (born June 4, 1988) is an American professional boxer who has held the WBO-NABO super middleweight title since January 2020.

== Professional career ==
Nelson made his professional debut on March 19, 2016, scoring a first-round technical knockout (TKO) victory over Billy Colon at the Arena Theatre in Houston, Texas.

After compiling a record of 15–0 (12 KOs) he fought for his first professional title, facing Cem Kilic for the vacant WBO-NABO super middleweight title on January 11, 2020, at the Hard Rock Live in Atlantic City, New Jersey. Nelson captured the title via eighth-round TKO after Kilic's trainer, Buddy McGirt, climbed onto the ring apron to ask referee David Fields to stop the fight to save Kilic from further punishment. Fields obliged and called a halt to the contest at 1 minute 44 seconds into the round. At the time of the stoppage, Nelson had won every round on the judges' scorecards, leading with 70–63.

== Professional boxing record ==
22 fights	20 wins	2 losses
By knockout	16	1
By decision	4	1

No.	Result	Record	Opponent	Type	Round, time	Date	Location	Notes
22	Loss	20–2	Raiko Santana	TKO	1 (10), 2:38	Sep 13, 2025	Allegiant Stadium, Paradise, Nevada, U.S.	
21	Loss	20–1	Diego Pacheco	UD	12	Jan 25, 2025	Chelsea Ballroom, Paradise, Nevada, U.S.	For WBC-USNBC and WBO International super middleweight titles
20	Win	20–0	Marcos Vazquez	KO	5 (10), 0:50	Aug 3, 2024	BMO Stadium, Los Angeles, California, U.S.	
19	Win	19–0	Rowdy Legend Montgomery	UD	10	Jul 29, 2023	T-Mobile Arena, Paradise, Nevada, U.S.	
18	Win	18–0	James Ballard	KO	1 (8), 2:47	Dec 10, 2022	CHI Health Center, Omaha, Nebraska, U.S.	
17	Win	17–0	DeAndre Ware	TKO	6 (10), 2:44	Sep 5, 2020	MGM Grand Conference Center, Paradise, Nevada, U.S.	
16	Win	16–0	Cem Kilic	TKO	8 (10), 1:44	Jan 11, 2020	Hard Rick Live, Atlantic City, New Jersey, U.S.	Won vacant WBO-NABO super middleweight title
15	Win	15–0	Derrick Findley	TKO	4 (10), 0:02	Sep 1, 2019	CHI Health Center, Omaha, Nebraska, U.S.	
14	Win	14–0	Victor Darocha	TKO	7 (8), 2:42	May 25, 2019	Osceola Heritage Park, Kissimmee, Florida, U.S.	
13	Win	13–0	Felipe Romero	UD	6	Feb 15, 2019	Grand Casino, Hinckley, Minnesota, U.S.	
12	Win	12–0	Oscar Riojas	TKO	4 (6)	Oct 13, 2018	CHI Health Center, Omaha, Nebraska, U.S.	
11	Win	11–0	DeShon Webster	TKO	6 (6), 0:46	Jun 9, 2018	MGM Grand, Paradise, Nevada, U.S.	
10	Win	10–0	Mike Sawyer	KO	2 (6), 1:24	Mar 31, 2018	Platt Duetsche, Grand Island, Nebraska, U.S.	
9	Win	9–0	Cesar Ruiz	UD	6	Aug 19, 2017	Pinnacle Bank Arena, Lincoln, Nebraska, U.S.	
8	Win	8–0	Demetrius Walker	TKO	3 (6), 1:07	Jul 1, 2017	Ralston Center, Omaha, Nebraska, U.S.	
7	Win	7–0	Gilberto Rubio	TKO	2 (6), 0:36	May 20, 2017	Madison Square Garden, New York City, New York, U.S.	
6	Win	6–0	Branden Chevrefils	TKO	2 (4), 1:29	Dec 17, 2016	Ralston Center, Omaha, Nebraska, U.S.	
5	Win	5–0	Chris Harris	UD	4	Dec 10, 2016	CenturyLink Center, Omaha, Nebraska, U.S.	
4	Win	4–0	Reyes Diaz	TKO	2 (4), 1:58	Nov 4, 2016	Treasure Island Hotel and Casino, Paradise, Nevada, U.S.	
3	Win	3–0	Tim Meek	TKO	4 (4), 0:32	Jul 23, 2016	MGM Grand Garden Arena, Paradise, Nevada, U.S.	
2	Win	2–0	Ricky Reed	TKO	1 (4), 1:47	May 7, 2016	Ramada Hotel & Convention Center, Omaha, Nebraska, U.S.	
1	Win	1–0	Billy Colon	TKO	1 (4), 2:30	Mar 19, 2016	Arena Theatre, Houston, Texas, U.S.	

Sporting positions
Regional boxing titles
Vacant Title last held by Erik Bazinyan	WBO-NABO super middleweight champion January 11, 2020 – present	Incumbent
