= Museum of Contemporary Tibetan Art =

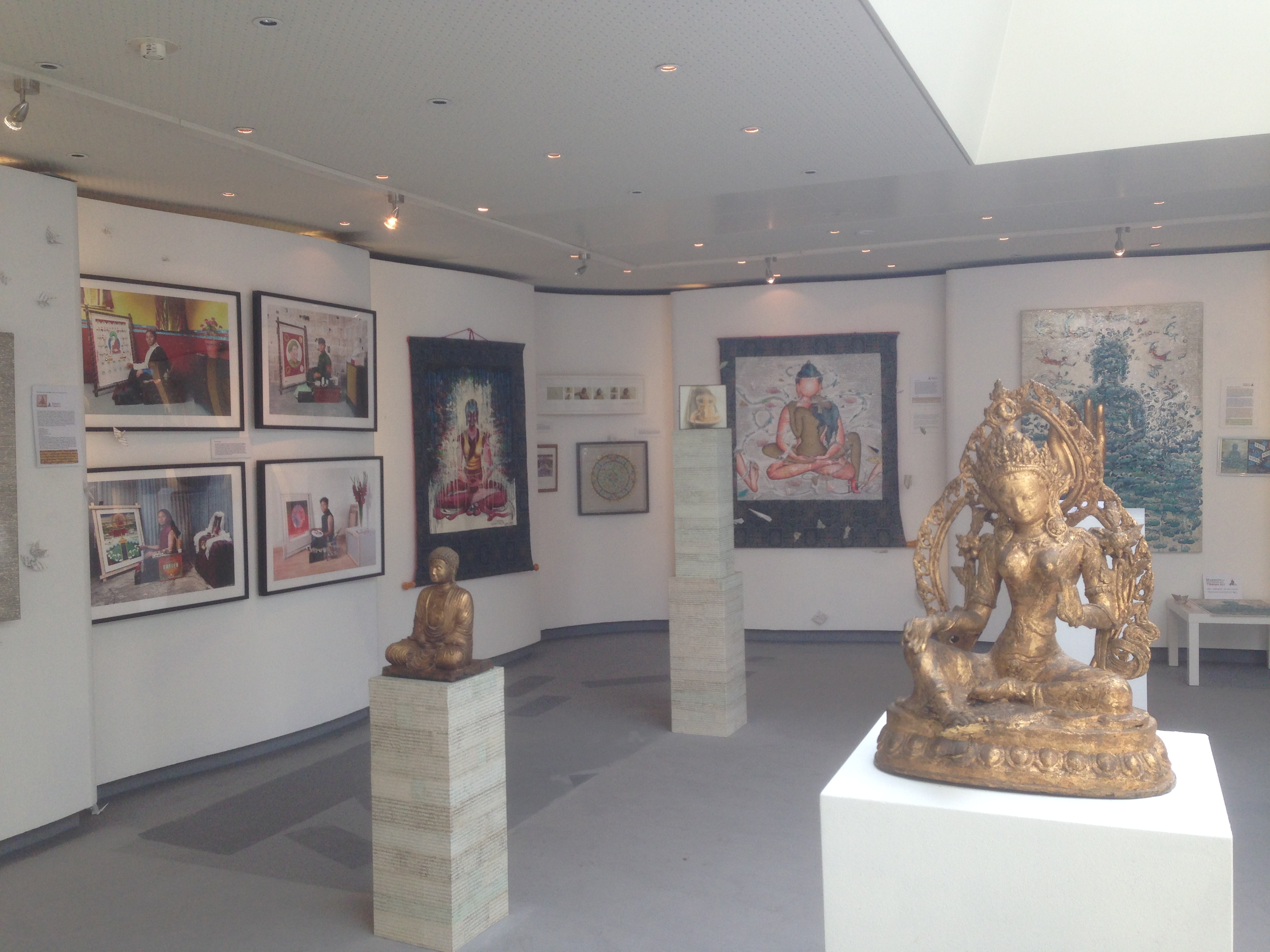
Image of the Museum of Contemporary Tibetan Art

The Museum of Contemporary Tibetan Art is located in the Rensenpark in Emmen, in the north-eastern part of the Netherlands, near the German border. It has permanent and temporary exhibitions of contemporary Tibetan art.

The founder/artist of the museum is the Tibetan Buddhist monk Lama Tashi Norbu who together with Artist Leela Eleni Skitsa shaped this unique museum in Emmen.

The exhibition brings together Tibetan artists and you will discover the "Tibetan Altar", Traditional "Thangkas", panels on the story of the 14th Dalai Lama of Tibet, as well as ancient Tibetan artifacts and writings, talismans, ornaments of indigenous Tibetans.

The museum aims to convey ideological concepts, preserving imprints of Tibetan art and culture, but also paying attention to “the voice of Tibet,” its cause, its land and its culture!

Translated with DeepL.com (free version)

== Museum ==
The museum's mission is to spread awareness of and educate local and international visitors about Tibetan art and Culture. The museum opened its doors to the Public in June, 2017. The museum hosts a collection of works featuring Tibetan and Tibet-inspired artists, among which, is works created by Lama Tashi Norbu of Bhutan. Throughout the years the museum accommodates retreats, workshops, lectures, performances, festivals, which focus on educating the public about the preservation of Tibetan art and culture.

The museum is established in the former zoo of the Rensenpark, Emmen, Drenthe, Netherlands. Emmen Municipality founded a creative industry hub in the Rensenpark, supporting not only the Museum of Contemporary Tibetan Art, but various art galleries and other artistic and non-artistic spaces.

== Gallery ==
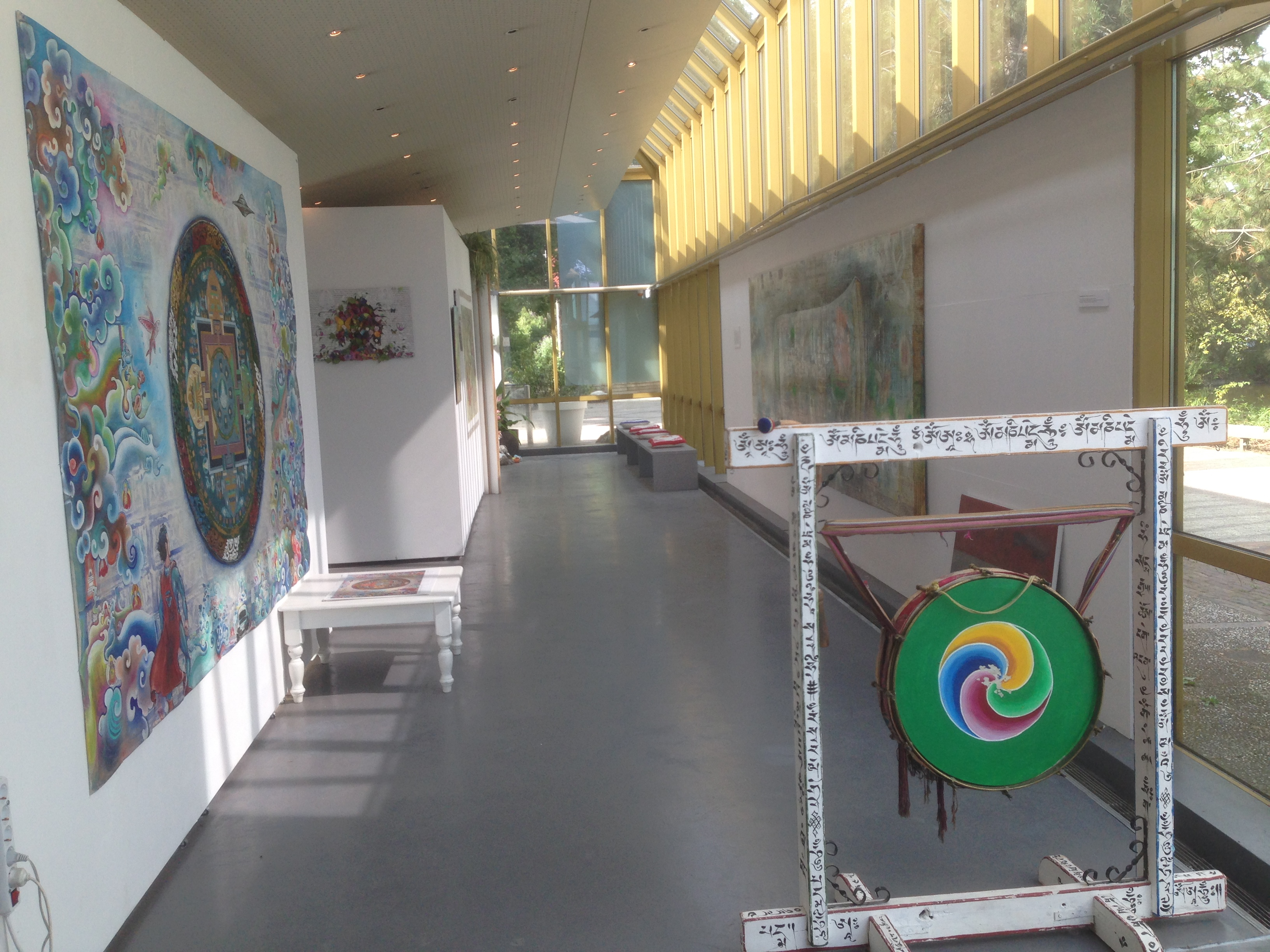

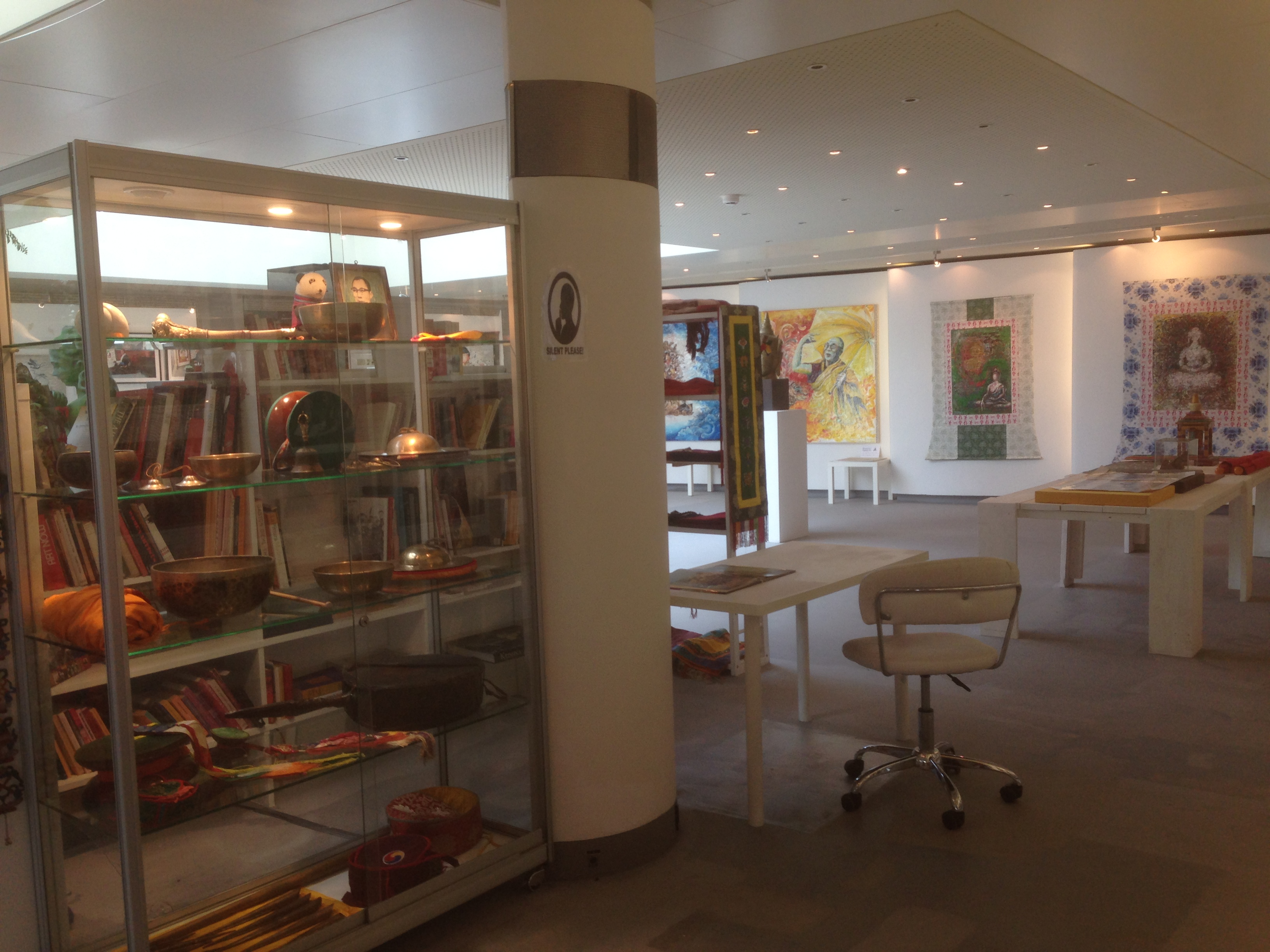

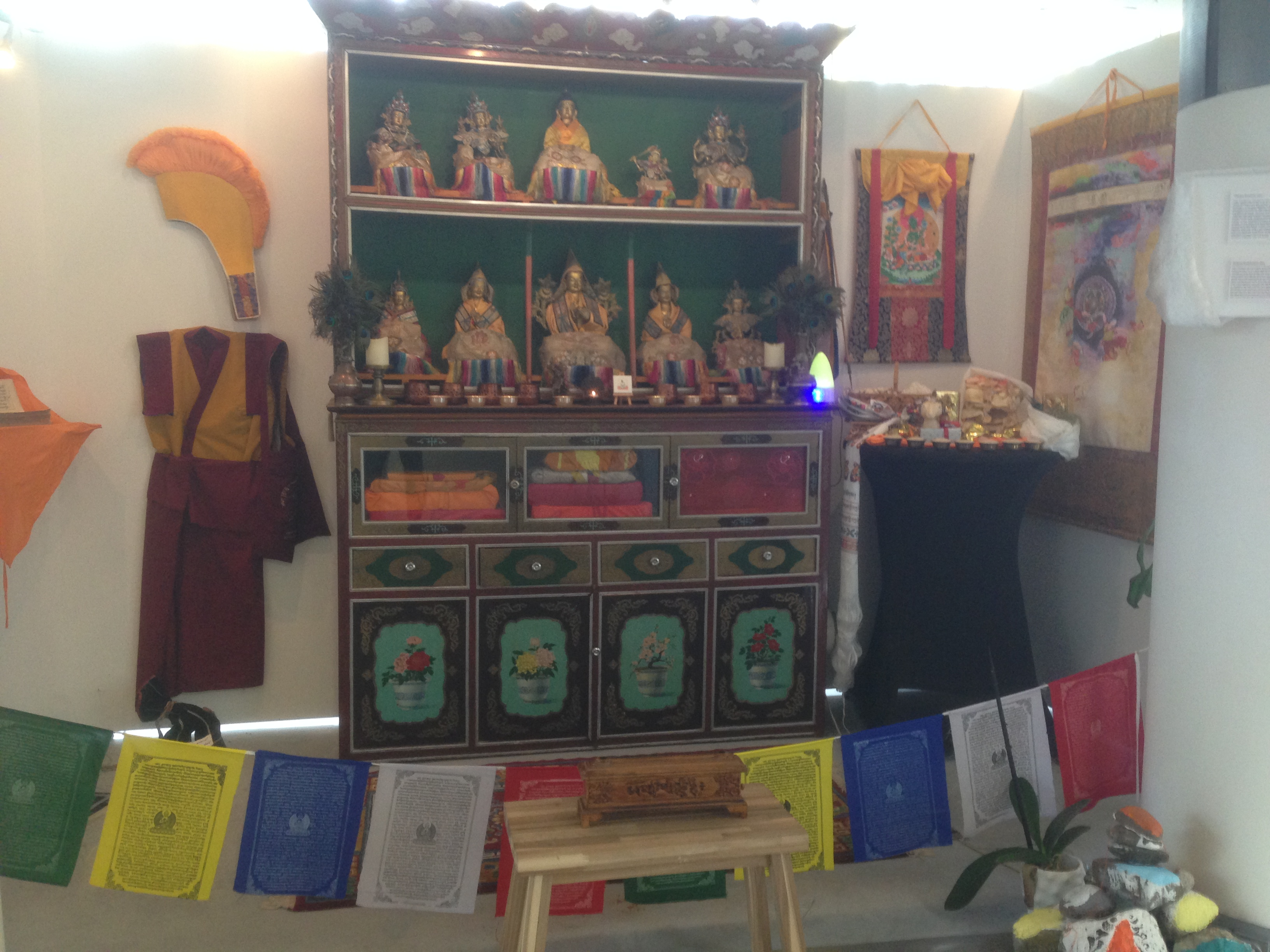

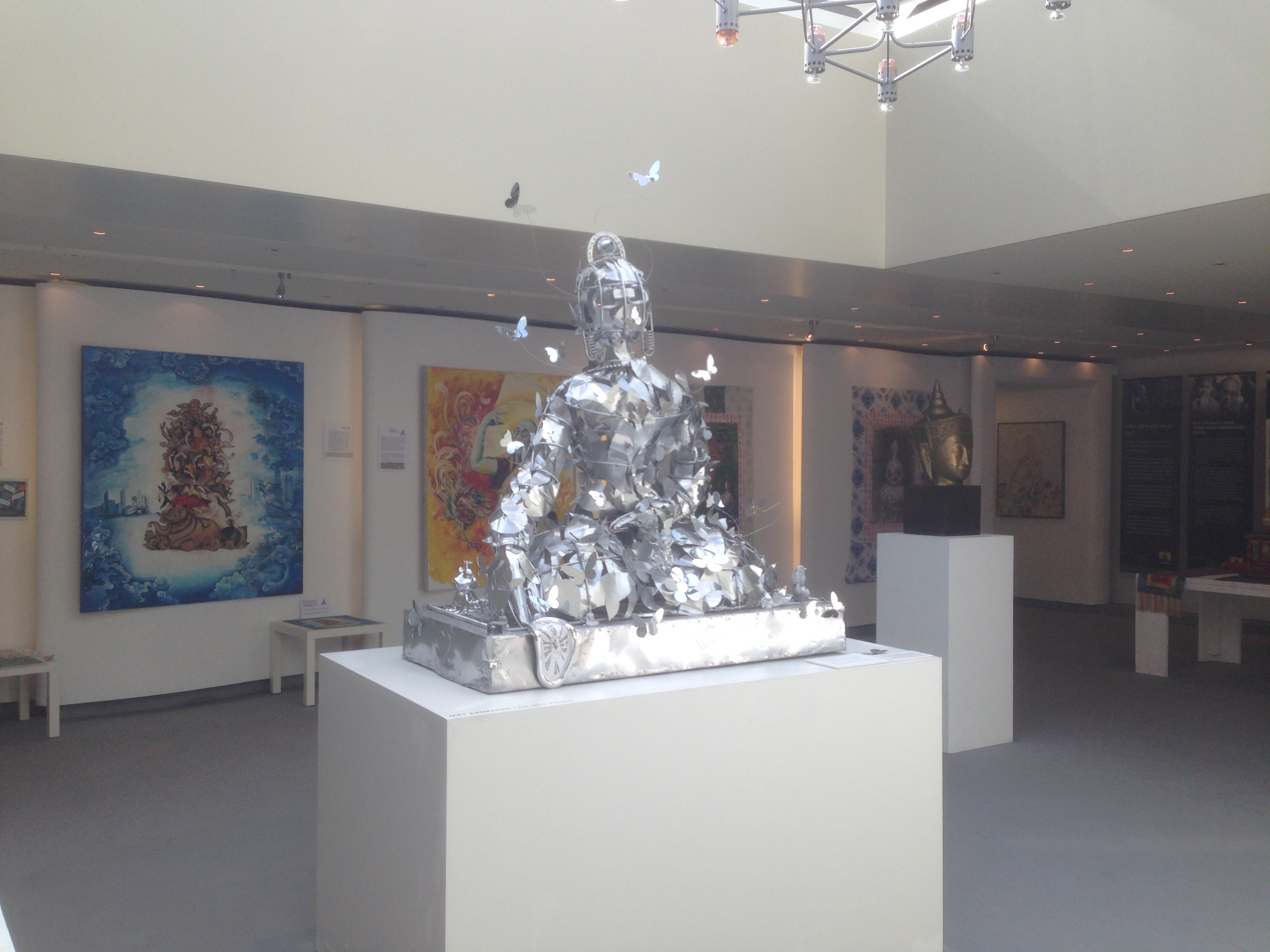

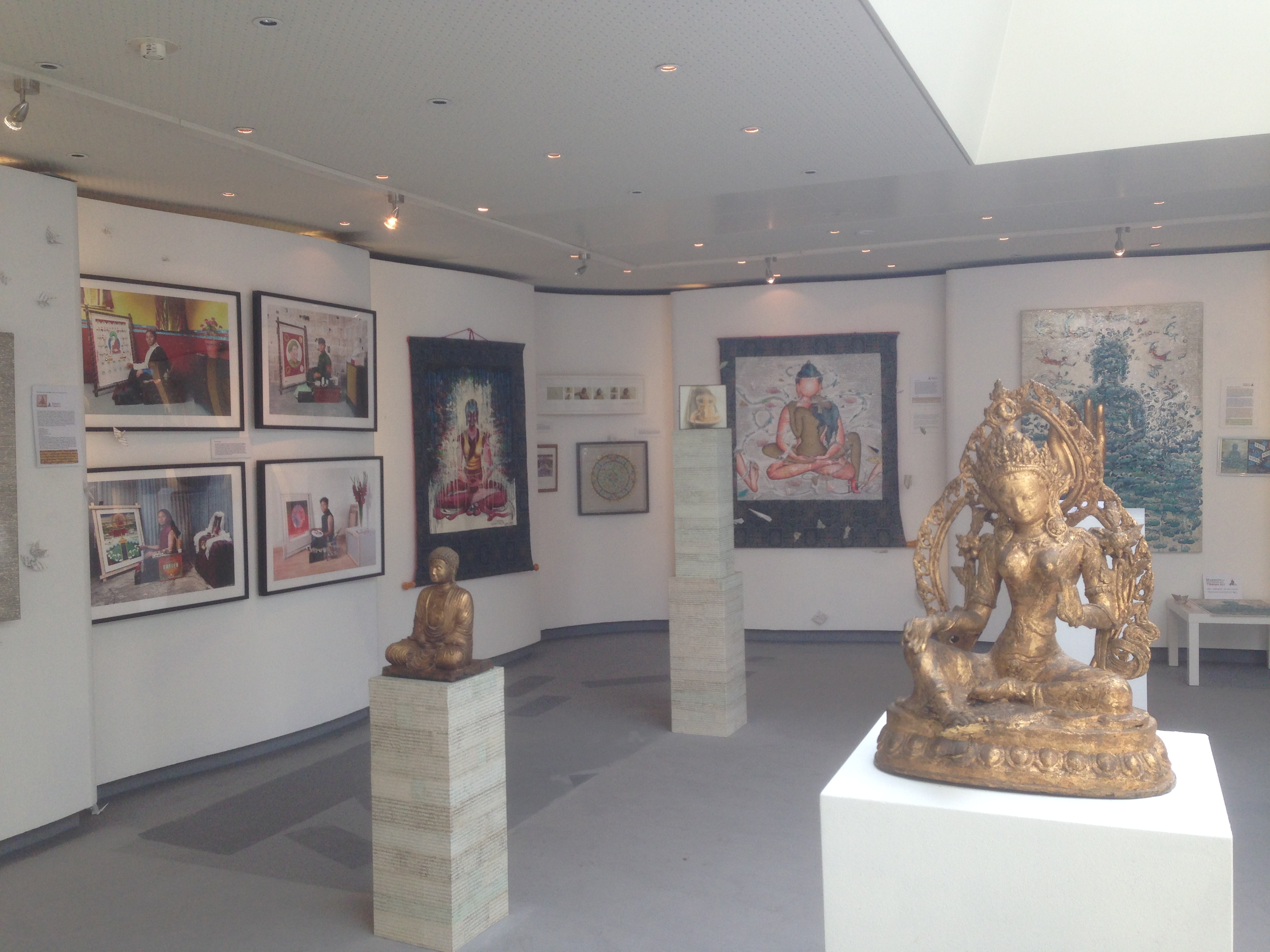

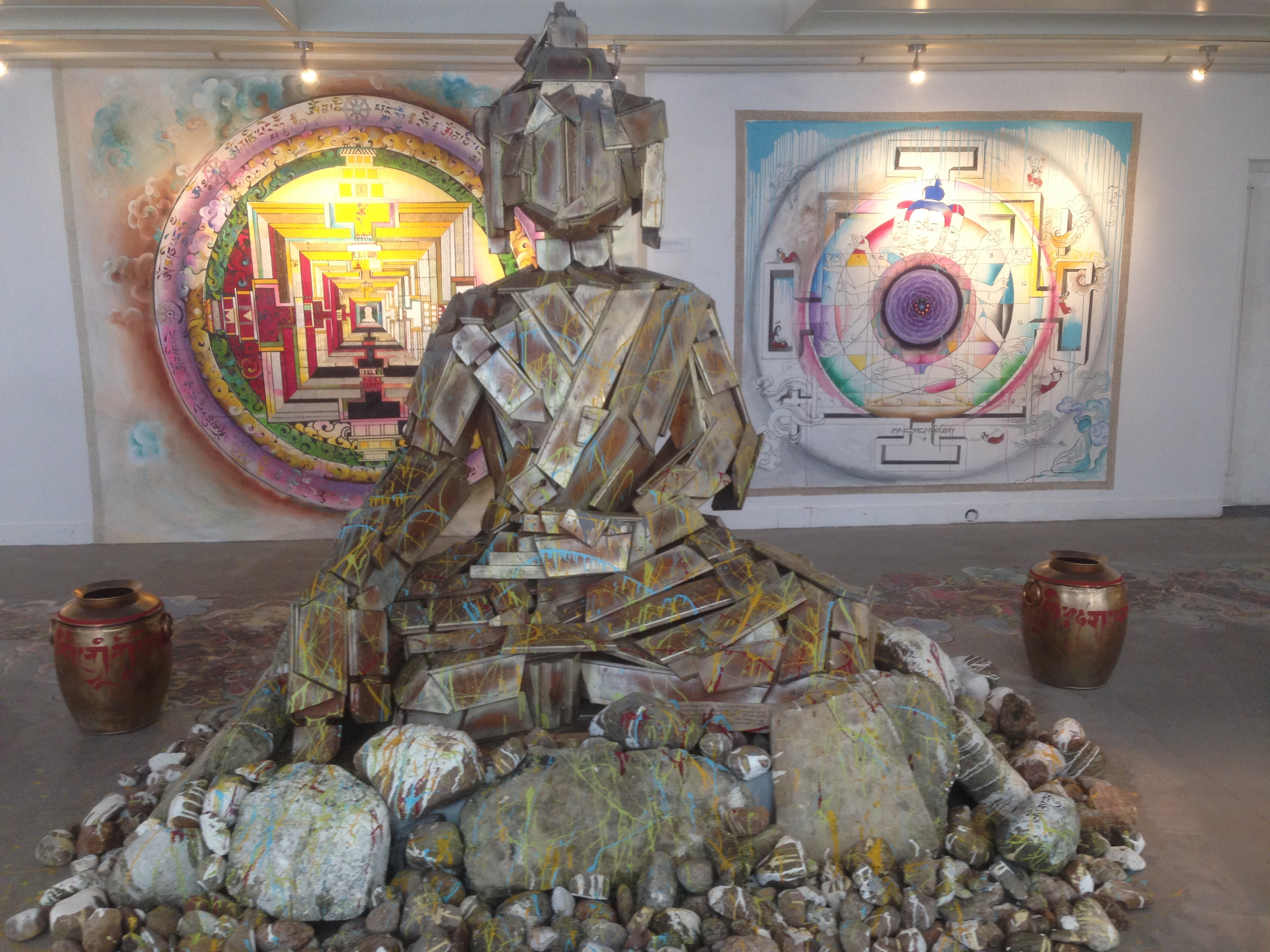

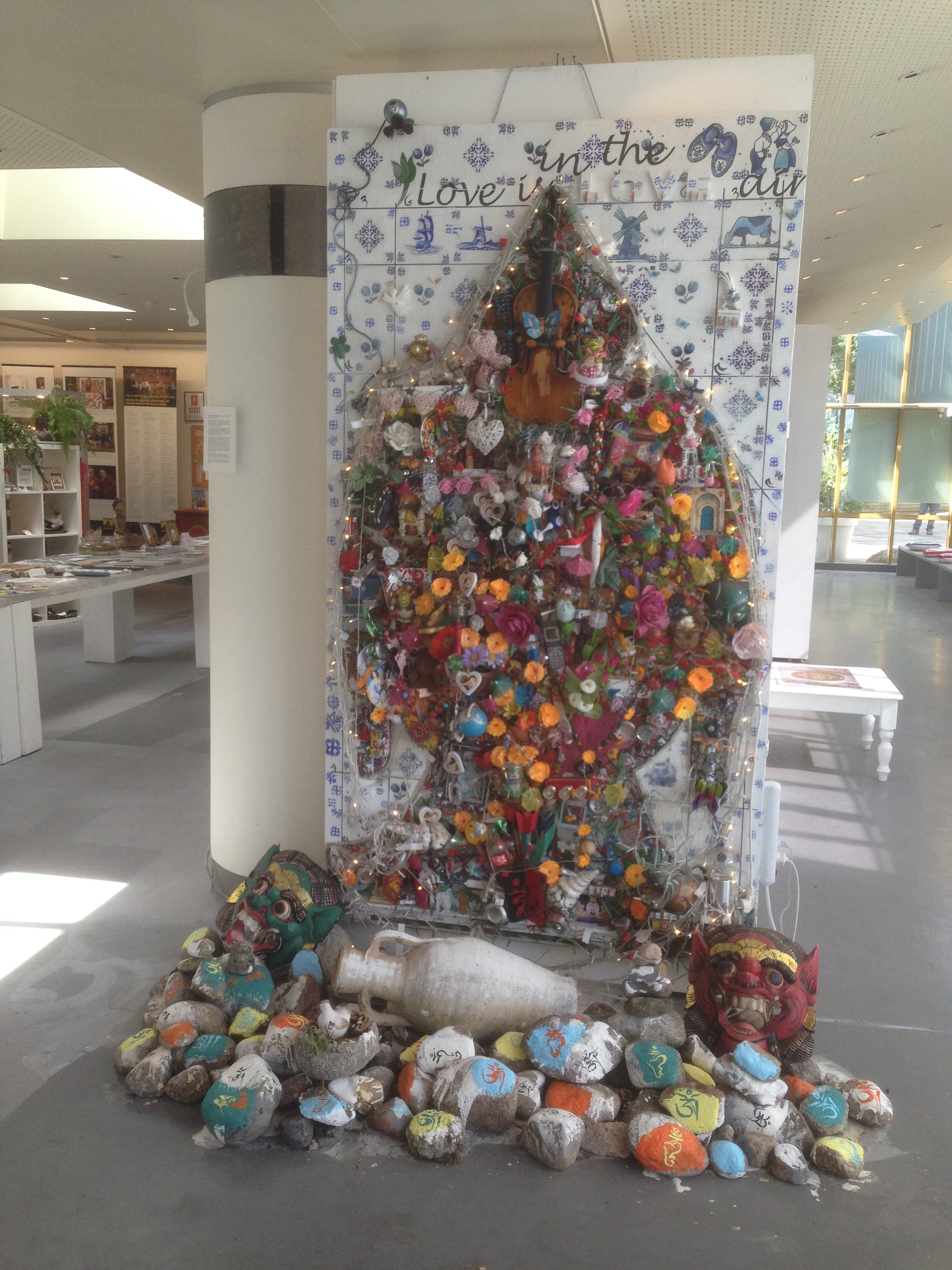

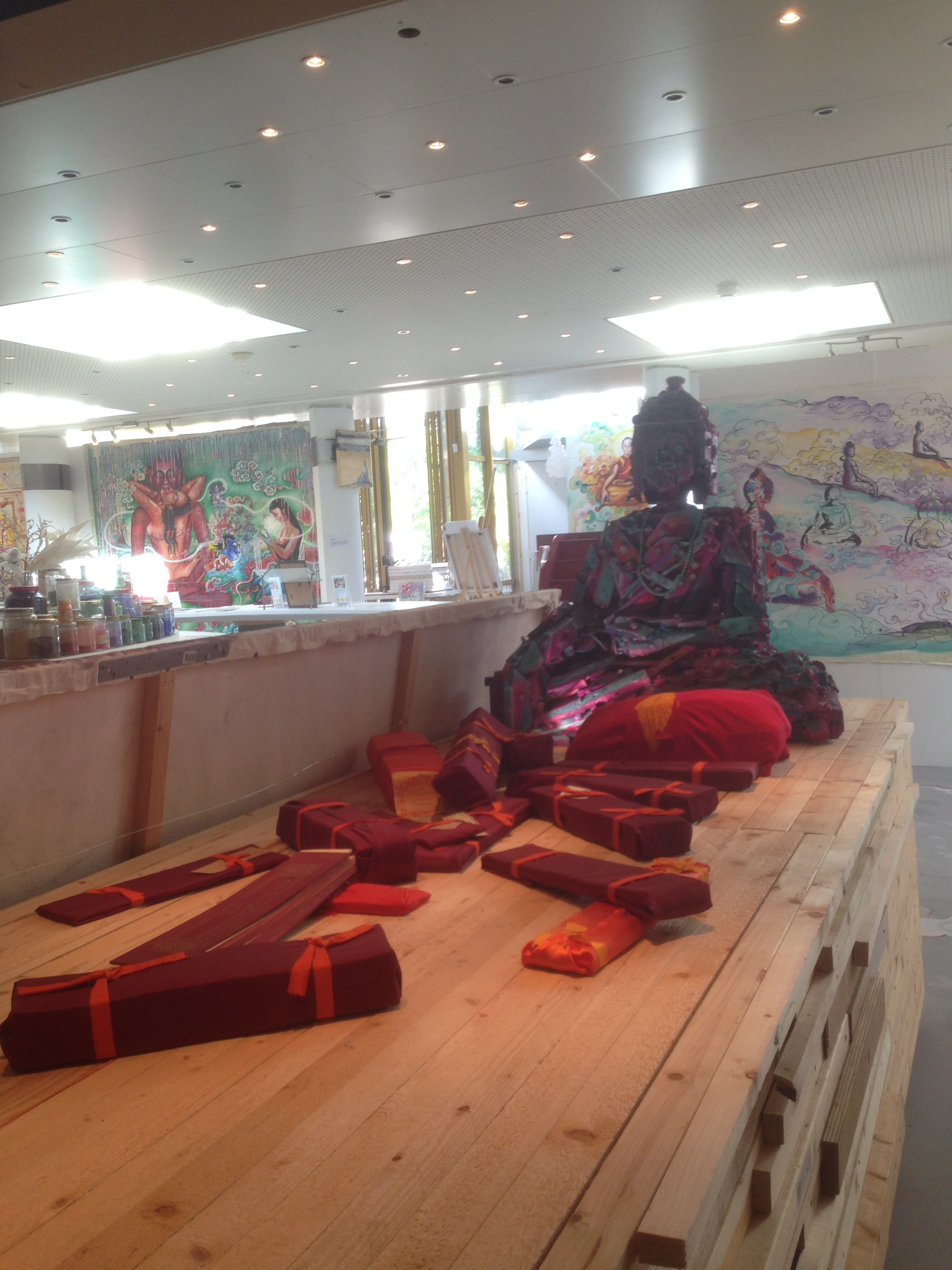
