= Pavel Silyagin =

Russian boxer

Personal information
- Nationality: Russian
- Born: Павел Васильевич Силягин; 13 August 1993 (age 33) Novokuznetsk, Kemerovo Oblast, Russia
- Height: 6 ft 1 in (185 cm)
- Weight: Super-middleweight

Boxing career
- Stance: Orthodox

Boxing record
- Total fights: 18
- Wins: 16
- Win by KO: 7
- Losses: 1
- Draws: 1

Pavel Silyagin (born 13 August 1993) is a Russian professional boxer who held the WBC Silver super-middleweight. As of December 2022, he is ranked as the world's seventh best active super middleweight by the Transnational Boxing Rankings Board and ninth by BoxRec.

== Professional career ==
Silyagin made his professional debut on 1 February 2020, winning a sixth-round unanimous decision over Bartlomiej Grafka at the Yantarny Sports Palace in Kaliningrad.

== Professional boxing record ==
18 fights	16 wins	1 loss
By knockout	7	1
By decision	9	0
Draws	1	

No.	Result	Record	Opponent	Type	Round, time	Date	Location	Notes
18	Loss	16–1–1	Osleys Iglesias	RTD	8 (12), 3:00	9 Apr 2026	Montreal Casino, Montreal, Canada	For IBO and vacant IBF super-middleweight titles
17	Win	16–0–1	Pablo Exequiel Corzo	UD	10	5 Jul 2025	DIVS, Ekaterinburg, Russia	
16	Win	15–0–1	Ulugbek Sobirov	UD	10	6 Sep 2024	Traktor Sports Palace, Chelyabinsk, Russia	Won vacant IBF Inter-Continental super-middleweight title
15	Win	14–0–1	Rizvan Elikhanov	TKO	1 (10), 2:24	10 Feb 2024	KRK “Uralets”, Ekaterinburg, Russia	
14	Draw	13–0–1	Evgeny Shvedenko	SD	10	8 Sep 2023	Traktor Sport Palace, Chelyabinsk, Russia	
13	Win	13–0	Leonard Carrillo	KO	4 (10), 1:18	7 Mar 2023	DIVS, Ekaterinburg, Russia	
12	Win	12–0	Abraham Gabriel Buonarrigo	UD	10	19 Nov 2022	RCC Boxing Academy, Ekaterinburg, Russia	
11	Win	11–0	Jose de Jesus Macias	UD	10	9 Jul 2022	KRK “Uralets”, Ekaterinburg, Russia	
10	Win	10–0	Nizar Trimech	KO	6 (10), 2:59	31 Jan 2022	USC Soviet Wings, Moscow, Russia	
9	Win	9–0	Isaac Chilemba	UD	12	26 Nov 2021	USC Soviet Wings, Moscow, Russia	Retained WBC Silver super-middleweight title
8	Win	8–0	Abdallah Paziwapazi	UD	10	20 May 2021	Lokomotiv Arena, Novosibirsk, Russia	
7	Win	7–0	Azizbek Abdugofurov	UD	12	20 Mar 2021	Khodynka Ice Palace, Moscow, Russia	Won WBC Silver super-middleweight title
6	Win	6–0	Omar Garcia	KO	1 (10), 2:00	29 Jan 2021	USC Soviet Wings, Moscow, Russia	
5	Win	5–0	Siarhei Khamitski	RTD	4 (10), 3:00	24 Dec 2020	USC Soviet Wings, Moscow, Russia	
4	Win	4–0	Orkhan Gadzhiev	RTD	2 (10), 3:00	22 Aug 2020	Pyramide, Kazan, Russia	
3	Win	3–0	Artysh Lopsan	TKO	7 (10), 1:55	3 Jul 2020	USC Soviet Wings, Moscow, Russia	
2	Win	2–0	Maxim Smirnov	UD	6	15 Jun 2020	USC Soviet Wings, Moscow, Russia	
1	Win	1–0	Bartlomiej Grafka	UD	6	1 Feb 2020	Yantarny Sports Palace, Kaliningrad, Russia	
