= Light heavyweight =

Weight class used in boxing, kickboxing, and mixed martial arts

Light heavyweight is a weight class in combat sports.

== Boxing ==
=== Professional ===
In professional boxing, the division is above 168 pounds (76 kg) and up to 175 pounds (79 kg), falling between super middleweight and cruiserweight.

The light heavyweight class has produced some of boxing's greatest champions: Bernard Hopkins (who, upon becoming champion, broke the record for oldest man to win a world title), Tommy Loughran, Billy Conn, Joey Maxim, Archie Moore, Michael Moorer, Bob Foster, Ann Wolfe, Michael Spinks, Dariusz Michalczewski, Roy Jones Jr., Joe Calzaghe, Sergey Kovalev, Zsolt Erdei, Dmitry Bivol, & Artur Beterbiev.

Many light heavyweight champions unsuccessfully challenged for the heavyweight crown until Michael Spinks became the first reigning light heavyweight champion to win the heavyweight championship. Bob Fitzsimmons captured the light heavyweight championship after losing his heavyweight championship. Two all-time great heavyweight champions, Ezzard Charles and Floyd Patterson, started out as light heavyweights. Charles defeated Archie Moore and Joey Maxim several times in non-title bouts before becoming heavyweight champion and Patterson lost an eight-round decision to Joey Maxim before becoming heavyweight champion himself. Evander Holyfield successfully moved up from the light heavyweight division to the cruiserweight division and eventually the heavyweight division and became undisputed champion of the latter two.

==== Current world champions ====
Sanctioning body	Reign began	Champion	Record	Defenses
WBA	February 22, 2025	Dmitry Bivol	25–1 (12 KO)	1
WBC	November 7, 2026	Willy Hutchinson	21–2 (14 KO)	0
IBF	February 22, 2025	Dmitry Bivol	25–1 (12 KO)	1
WBO	February 22, 2025	Dmitry Bivol	25–1 (12 KO)	0

==== Current world rankings ====
===== The Ring =====
As of July 2, 2026.

Keys:

C Current The Ring world champion

Rank	Name	Record (W–L–D)	Title(s)
C	Dmitry Bivol	25–1 (12 KO)	WBA, IBF, WBO
1	David Benavidez	32–0 (26 KO)	WBC, WBA (Regular)
2	Calum Smith	31–2 (22 KO)	WBO (Interim)
3	Anthony Yarde	27–4 (24 KO)	
4	Imam Khataev	12–1 (11 KO)	
5	Joshua Buatsi	20–1 (13 KO)	
6	Willy Hutchinson	20–2 (14 KO)	
7	Najee Lopez	16–0 (13 KO)	
8	Lerrone Richards	19–2 (4 KO)	
9	Albert Ramirez	23–0 (19 KO)	WBA (Interim)
10	Ben Whittaker	12–0–1 (9 KO)	

===== BoxRec =====
As of 2 July 2026

Rank	Name	Record (W–L–D)	Title(s)
1	Dmitry Bivol	25–1 (12 KO)	WBA, IBF, WBO, The Ring
2	Joshua Buatsi	20–1 (13 KO)	
3	Imam Khataev	12–1 (11 KO)	
4	Ali Izmailov	15–0 (13 KO)	
5	Willy Hutchinson	20–2 (14 KO)	
6	Najee Lopez	16–0 (13 KO)	
7	Albert Ramirez	23–0 (19 KO)	WBA (Interim)
8	Umar Dzambekov	14–0 (10 KO)	
9	Atif Oberlton	16–0 (14 KO)	
10	Ben Whittaker	12–0–1 (9 KO)	

==== Longest reigning world light heavyweight champions ====
Below is a list of longest reigning light heavyweight champions in boxing measured by the individual's longest reign. Career total time as champion (for multiple time champions) does not apply.

	Name	Title reign	Title recognition	Successful defenses	Beaten opponents	Fights
1.	Archie Moore	9 years, 4 months, 24 days	NYSAC, NBA	9	7	
2.	Dariusz Michalczewski	9 years, 1 months, 8 days	IBF, WBA, WBO	23	20	
3.	Artur Beterbiev	7 years, 3 months, 1 week and 5 days	IBF, WBC, WBO, WBA	9	9	
4.	Gus Lesnevich	7 years, 2 months, 2 days	NYSAC, NBA	5	3	
5.	Dmitry Bivol	7 years, 3 weeks and 3 days	IBF, WBC, WBO, WBA	12	12	
6.	Bob Foster	6 years, 0 months, 23 days	WBC, WBA	14	13	
7.	Zsolt Erdei	5 years, 9 months, 27 days	WBO	11	10	
8.	Adonis Stevenson	5 years, 5 months, 24 days	WBC	9	9	
9.	Charles Williams	5 years, 4 months, 21 days	IBF	8	8	
10.	Roy Jones Jr.	5 years, 2 months, 25 days	WBC, IBF, WBA (Super)	11	11	
11.	Virgil Hill	4 years, 9 months, 15 days	WBA	10	10	
12.	Maxie Rosenbloom	4 years, 4 months, 22 days	NYSAC, NBA	7	6	
13.	Michael Spinks	4 years, 2 months, 3 days	IBF, WBA, WBC	10	10	
14.	Battling Levinsky	3 years, 11 months, 19 days	World	1	1	
15.	Victor Galindez	3 years, 9 months, 8 days	WBA	10	7	

Active title reign
Reign has ended

=== Amateur ===
In amateur boxing, light heavyweight is a weight division above 165 pounds (75 kg) and up to 178 pounds (81 kg), falling between middleweight and heavyweight.

==== Olympic champions ====
- 1920 – Eddie Eagan (USA)
- 1924 – Harry Mitchell (GBR)
- 1928 – Víctor Avendaño (ARG)
- 1932 – David Carstens (RSA)
- 1936 – Roger Michelot (FRA)
- 1948 – George Hunter (RSA)
- 1952 – Norvel Lee (USA)
- 1956 – James Boyd (USA)
- 1960 – Muhammad Ali (USA)
- 1964 – Cosimo Pinto (ITA)
- 1968 – Danas Pozniakas (URS)
- 1972 – Mate Parlov (YUG)
- 1976 – Leon Spinks (USA)
- 1980 – Slobodan Kacar (YUG)
- 1984 – Anton Josipović (YUG)
- 1988 – Andrew Maynard (USA)
- 1992 – Torsten May (GER)
- 1996 – Vassiliy Jirov (KAZ)
- 2000 – Aleksandr Lebziak (RUS)
- 2004 – Andre Ward (USA)
- 2008 – Zhang Xiaoping (CHN)
- 2012 – Egor Mekhontsev (RUS)
- 2016 – Julio César La Cruz (CUB)
- 2020 – Arlen López (CUB)

== Kickboxing ==
- In kickboxing, a light heavyweight fighter generally weighs between 77 kg (171 lb) and 95 kg (210 lb).
- In International Kickboxing Federation (IKF), a light heavyweight division is 172.1 – 179 lb (78.3 – 81.4 kg).
- In Glory promotion, a light heavyweight division is up to 95 kg (209 lb).
- In Bellator Kickboxing promotion, a light heavyweight division is up to 95 kg (209 lb).
- In ONE Championship, the light heavyweight division is up to 102.1 kg (225 lb).

== Bare-knuckle boxing ==
The limit of light heavyweight generally differs among promotions in bare-knuckle boxing:

- In Bare Knuckle Fighting Championship, the light heavyweight division has an upper limit of 185 lb (84 kg).
- In BKB™, the light heavyweight division has an upper limit of 95 kg (209 lb).

== Mixed martial arts ==
In MMA, the light heavyweight division is from 186 lb (84 kg) to 205 lb (93 kg).
