= Auditorio Fausto Gutierrez Moreno =

Indoor arena in Tijuana, Mexico

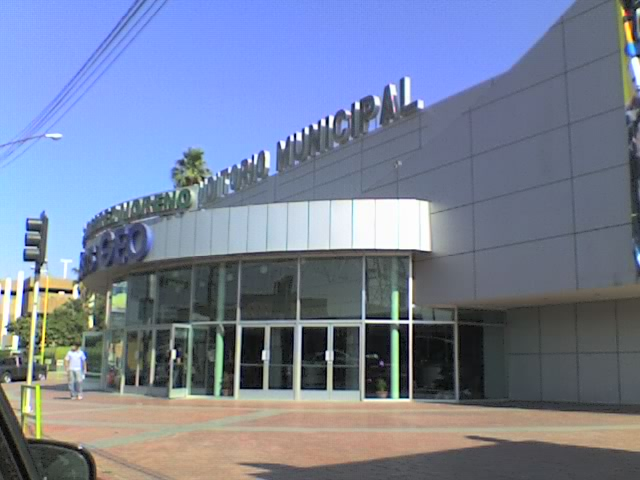
- Interactive map of Auditorio Fausto Gutierrez Moreno
- Location: Boulevard Gustavo Díaz Ordaz s/n, Fracc. El Paraíso, 22024 Tijuana, Baja California
- Coordinates: 32°30′29″N 116°59′20″W
- Capacity: 4,500

Tenant
- Galgos de Tijuana (LFA)

Auditorio Fausto Gutierrez Moreno also known as Auditorio de Tijuana is an indoor arena in Tijuana, Mexico. It is the home of the Galgos de Tijuana of the Liga de Fútbol Americano Profesional (LFA). The arena was built in 1969 and hosts a capacity of 4,500.

== Sources ==
- http://sic.conaculta.gob.mx/ficha.php?table=auditorio&table_id=743&estado_id=2&municipio_id=4&l=en
