= Bandido (wrestler) =

Mexican professional wrestler

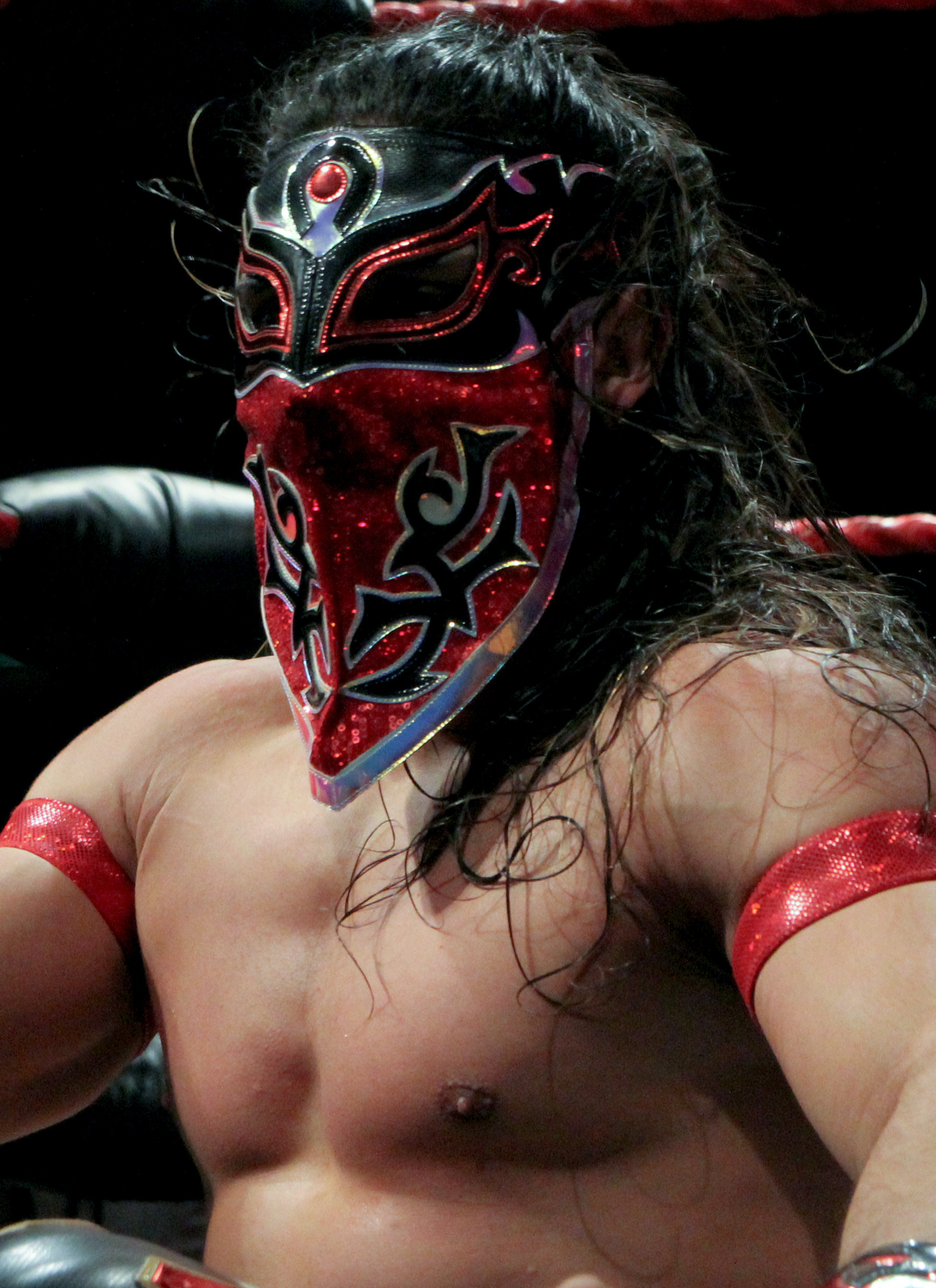
- Bandido in 2020

Personal information
- Born: April 17, 1995 (age 31) Torreón, Coahuila, Mexico
- Family: Gravity (brother); Magia Blanca (cousin); Myzteziz Jr.(cousin)
- Website: Facebook

Professional wrestling career
- Ring name(s): (El) Bandido; Cielito; Magnífico II
- Billed height: 170 cm (5 ft 7 in)
- Billed weight: 95.7 kg (211 lb)
- Trained by: Franco Columbo; Hijo del Gladiador; Último Guerrero
- Debut: June 19, 2011

Bandido (born April 17, 1995), or El Bandido, is a Mexican professional wrestler. He is signed to All Elite Wrestling (AEW), where he is one-half of Brodido with Brody King. He is a former two-time AEW World Trios Champion. He is also a former AEW World Tag Team Champion. He also performs in AEW's sister promotion Ring of Honor (ROH), where he is the reigning ROH World Champion in his second reign, and in partner promotion Consejo Mundial de Lucha Libre (CMLL).

Bandido is the cousin of Myzteziz Jr. and Magia Blanca. His younger brother Gravity is also a professional wrestler. His real name is not publicly known, which is often the case with masked wrestlers in Mexico.

Bandido previously worked under the ring names "Magnífico II" and "Cielito" but since 2016, he has used the ring character Bandido, who wears a mask that incorporates a bandana covering the lower part of his face in the style of Wild West outlaw. Bandido regularly teamed with Flamita, forming a duo known as "Mexa Blood". Bandido is a one-time PWG World Champion, and with Flamita and Rey Horus he has held the ROH World Six-Man Tag Team Championship. Bandido has also achieved much success as a singles competitor, his feats including winning PWG's 2019 Battle of Los Angeles, and ROH's 2021 Survival of the Fittest tournaments. Bandido is a former world champion in the latter promotions, winning the PWG World Championship and Ring of Honor World Championship.

== Personal life ==
Bandido was born on April 17, 1995, in Torreón, Coahuila, Mexico. Bandido's cousin Magia Blanca is also a professional wrestler in the Consejo Mundial de Lucha Libre promotion. He is also related to Myzteziz Jr. who wrestles in Lucha Libre AAA Worldwide.

Bandido currently uses "Canción del Mariachi" as his theme song, as a tribute to the late Héctor Garza (who used this song as his entrance song throughout his professional wrestling career until 2012, when he was forced to retire due to advanced lung cancer).

== Professional wrestling career ==
=== Early career ===
The wrestler later known as Bandido began training in the wrestling school Consejo Mundial de Lucha Libre in Mexico City, where he was primarily trained by Franco Columbo, Hijo del Gladiador and Último Guerrero for his in-ring debut. Because Bandido has never been unmasked in the ring, his birth name is not a matter of public knowledge- a tradition in Mexico for masked wrestlers.

=== Independent circuit (2011–present) ===
==== Magnífico II / Cielito (2011–2015) ====
For his debut, Bandido adopted the ring name "Magnífico II" and formed a tag team known as Los Magníficos ("The Magnificent Ones") with his cousin, who worked as Magnífico I. The duo worked for various promotions on the Mexican independent circuit including Wrestling Martin Calderon (WMC), Cara Lucha and Lucha Memes. In 2015, Magnífico II traveled to England, where he worked a show that was promoted by El Hijo del Santo.

In mid-2015 Magnífico II began working for El Hijo del Santo's Todo x el Todo promotion, wrestling under the name "Cielito", named after the song Cielito Lindo. On October 5, 2015, Cielito unsuccessfully challenged Ángel Blanco Jr. for the WWA World Welterweight Championship.

==== Bandido (2016–present) ====
In mid-2016 Los Magníficos split up and Magnífico I started working for CMLL under the name "Magia Blanca" and Magnífico II began working for Lucha Libre Elite (LLE), adopting a new in-ring character called "El Bandido". His character, ring gear and mask were inspired by the Wild West bandit stereotype. His new mask incorporated a bandana that covered his nose and mouth, a stylized "Lone Ranger"-style markings around the eyes and a horseshoe on his forehead. On November 18, 2016, El Bandido outlasted Golden Magic, Argos, Emperador Azteca, Ciclón Ramírez Jr., Imposible, Eterno, Flamita, Diamante and Zumbido in a torneo cibernético elimination match to become the first Lucha Libre Elite Welterweight Champion. LLE closed 2017, but Bandido defended the LLE Welterweight Championship at least once after the promotion closed.

On September 28, 2017, Bandido defeated Ángel Blanco Jr. to win the WWA World Welterweight Championship in a show in Aguascalientes. Bandido came to Mexican national attention through his work for The Crash Lucha Libre as the promotion began expanding to touring nationally. His debut with the promotion was on November 29, 2017, where Bandido, Damián 666 and M-ximo lost to the team of Bestia 666, Garza Jr. and Mr. 450. In December, 2017 Bandido and Laredo Kid outlasted Perro Callejero Jr., Apando Negro Jr., Bestia 666, Crazy Latino, Dr. Polux, Emperador Azteca, Extreme Tiger, Murciélago Plateado Jr. and Rey Horus to win the G21 Torneo Gran Alternativa tournament.

Starting in 2018, Bandido started to work more for promotions outside Mexico, primarily in the United States, where he often teamed with Flamita under the team name "MexaBlood". On March 17, 2018, Bandido and Flamita defeated the teams Aeroboy and Séptimo Dragón, and The Rascalz (Dezmond Xavier and Zachary Wentz) to win the vacant The Crash Tag Team Championship. Two months later, Bandido became a double champion in The Crash when he won The Crash Cruiserweight Championship, defeating Dezmond Xavier and Laredo Kid for the vacant championship. Through Flamita's contacts in Japan, Bandido worked his first two tours with Dragon Gate in January and June 2018. During the British promotion Progress Wrestling's tour of the United States, Bandido and Flamita defeated A. R. Fox and Chris Brookes to win the Progress Tag Team Championship. Bandido teamed up with Rey Mysterio and Rey Fénix in the main event of the Indie wrestling super show All In, losing to The Golden Elite team of Kota Ibushi and The Young Bucks (Matt Jackson and Nick Jackson). MexaBlood traveled to England at the end of September 2018 to work once more for Progress Wrestling. On September 30, the duo lost the Progress Tag Team Championship to Aussie Open (Kyle Fletcher and Mark Davis). Mexa Blood were stripped of the tag team championship on October 7 for reasons that were never made public. On March 23, 2019, Jonathan Gresham won The Crash Cruiserweight Championship from Bandido; the match also included Flamita and Shane Strickland. After losing the cruiserweight title, Bandido challenged Rey Horus for The Crash Heavyweight Championship on July 5 and lost. In November 2019, Bandido defeated Rey Horus and Marty Scurll to win the heavyweight championship in a show in Tijuana.

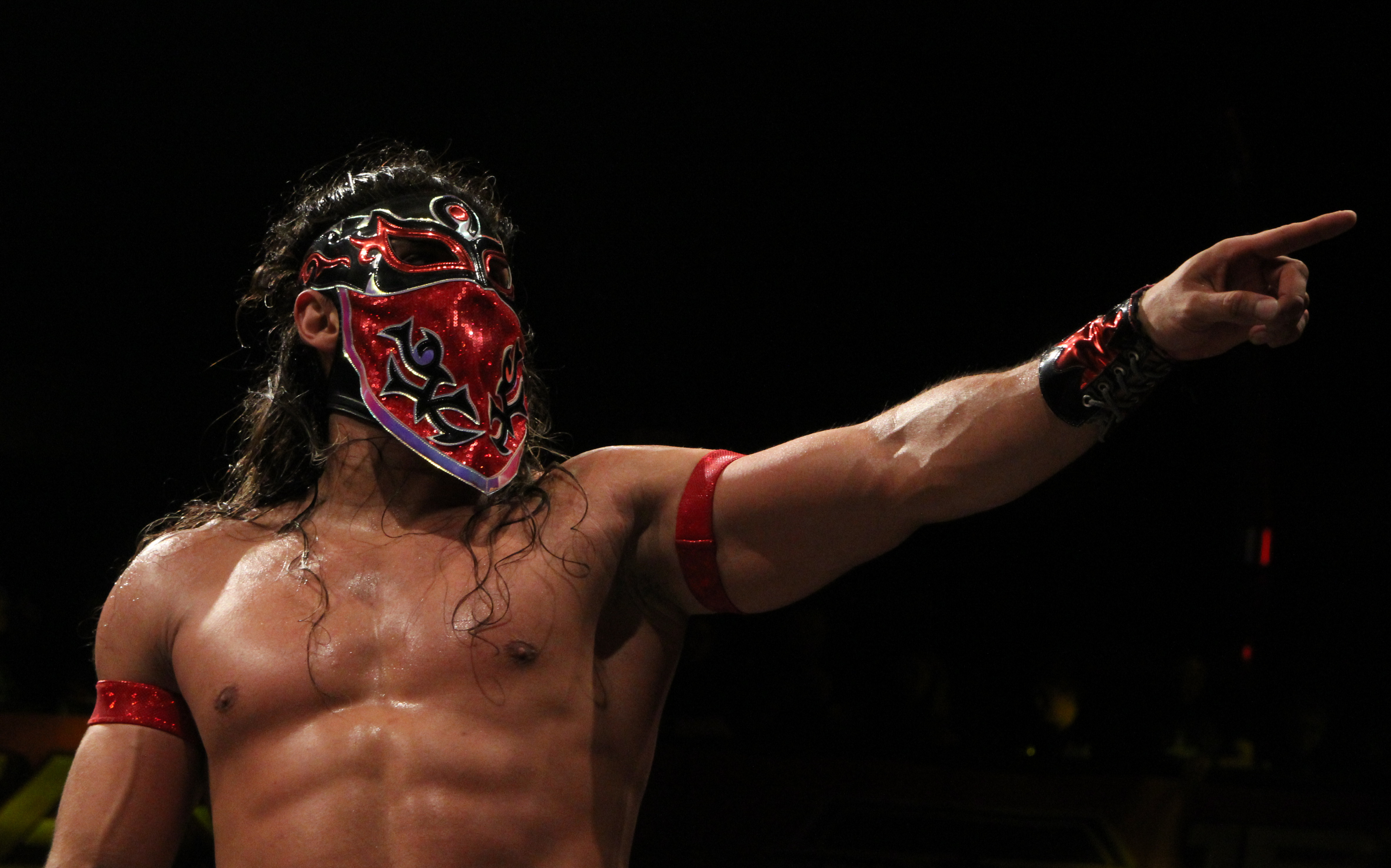
Bandido at 16 Carat Gold, 2020

In March 2020, Bandido participated in the 2020 16 Carat Gold, held by Westside Xtreme Wrestling (wXw). On night one, he defeated Julian Pace in the first round. On night two, Mike Bailey defeated him in the quarter-final. The match was well received by the crowd in attendance, who pelted the two men with coins and notes in appreciation. On night three, Bandido teamed with Pace and Jeff Cobb, defeated the team of Black Taurus, Hektor Invictus and Puma King.

=== Pro Wrestling Guerrilla (2018–2022) ===
On March 23, 2018, at the "Time Is A Flat Circle" event, Bandido made his Pro Wrestling Guerrilla (PWG) debut, losing in a tag team effort with Flamita against The Rascalz (Zachary Wentz and Dezmond Xavier). He was brought back for All-Star Weekend 14, which took place during the month of April. Bandido lost against Taiji Ishimori on Night One but went on to gain his first PWG victory against Rey Horus the next evening. His winning streak continued into May, when Bandido defeated Robbie Eagles at Bask in His Glory. Bandido kept winning consecutive matches after entering the 2018 Battle of Los Angeles (BOLA) tournament. He defeated T-Hawk in the opening round, Flamita in the quarterfinals, and Joey Janela in the semifinals. Entering the final round, he was the last man eliminated by eventual winner Jeff Cobb. After his national exposure in the tournament, it was reported that WWE, the world's largest wrestling promotion, was interested in signing Bandido to a full-time contract. In October, he defeated Rey Fénix at Smokey and the Bandido.

On September 19, 20, and 22; Bandido participated in the 2019 Battle of Los Angeles. He defeated Puma King in the first round (which was also for the Ironman Heavymetalweight Championship), Brody King in the quarterfinals, and Dragon Lee in the semi-finals. He defeated David and Jonathan Gresham in a three-way elimination match final to win the Battle of Los Angeles. After his BOLA victory, Bandido went on to defeat Jeff Cobb on December 20, to win the PWG World Championship. He would retain the title until May 1, 2022, when he lost it against Daniel Garcia.

=== Lucha Libre AAA Worldwide (2018) ===
In mid-2018, Lucha Libre AAA Worldwide (AAA) began a storyline in which LLE (no longer a separate promotion) invaded AAA. As part of the "Invasion" storyline, AAA brought in several former LLE wrestlers including Bandido, who with Flamita and Aramís made his AAA debut, losing to El Nuevo Poder del Norte (Carta Brava Jr., Mocho Cota Jr. and Tito Santana). Bandido was featured in his first major AAA storyline when he participated in a three-way match against Flamita and Fénix for the right to challenge for the AAA Mega Championship. Fénix won the match and the title match. At AAA's biggest show of the year Triplemanía XXVI, MexaBlood defeated Team AAA (Aero Star and Drago), Team Elite (Laredo Kid and Golden Magic) and Team Impact! (DJZ and Andrew Everett) to become the top contenders for the AAA World Tag Team Championship. Bandido's last AAA appearance was at Héroes Inmortales XII, where and Flamita lost a three-way tag team match for the AAA World Tag Team Championship to Los Mercenarios (Rey Escorpión and El Texano Jr.) in a match that also included Andrew Everett and DJZ.

=== Ring of Honor / All Elite Wrestling (2018–present) ===
==== Lifeblood (2018–2020) ====
In late 2018, it was reported Bandido has signed a full-time contract with the U.S.-based promotion Ring of Honor (ROH). In an interview, Bandido later said he turned down an offer from "the biggest company in the world" (referring to WWE) and instead chose to sign with ROH. He also turned down an offer to work for All Elite Wrestling he received around the time of his ROH negotiations. Bandido made his debut for the promotion at their January 12, 2019, television tapings, defeating Mark Haskins. He later joined a group called "Lifeblood", which was formed by Juice Robinson and also includes David Finlay, Mark Haskins, Tracy Williams and Tenille Dashwood. The following day, Bandido defeated P.J. Black as part of ROH's Honor Reigns Supreme supercard event. As The Mexa Squad, Bandido alongside Rey Horus and Flamita won the ROH 6-Man Tag Team Championships. However, a few months later, they would lose the titles to Shane Taylor Promotions. The group disbanded shortly after, after Flamita turned heel by attacking both his partners.

==== Singles competition (2021–2025) ====
After winning the 2021 ROH Survival of the Fittest tournament to earn the title shot, Bandido would go on to win the ROH World Championship from Rush at Best in the World on July 11, marking his first major world championship. In December, Bandido was forced to vacate the title due to testing positive for COVID-19. During Bandido's reign, ROH went on hiatus and his contract was acquired by All Elite Wrestling (AEW).

Because he never lost the title, Bandido continued to appear with the belt at numerous independent shows. Bandido lost to Jonathan Gresham on April 1, 2022, during the Supercard of Honor XV, who was the officially recognized ROH Champion at the time. Bandido made his debut for AEW on the September 28, 2022 edition of AEW Dynamite, where he received his rematch for the ROH World Championship, against champion Chris Jericho, but lost the match. On November 11, Bandido signed with AEW after a bout with Rush. On the April 26, 2023 episode of Dynamite, Bandido unsuccessfully challenged Orange Cassidy for the AEW International Championship. On the June 14 episode of AEW Rampage, Bandido was defeated by Konosuke Takeshita. During the match, Bandido suffered a wrist injury, rendering him out of action indefinitely.

On the December 4, 2024 episode of Dynamite, a vignette was shown teasing Bandido's return. On December 20 at Final Battle, Bandido made his return to ROH, where he came to the aid of Matt Cardona from an attack by The Learning Tree (Chris Jericho, Big Bill, and Bryan Keith), but suffered a concussion when he landed on his head during the segment. On the February 1, 2025 episode of AEW Collision, Bandido returned from his concussion, coming to the aid of The Outrunners (Truth Magnum and Turbo Floyd) from an attack by The Learning Tree. The following week on Collision, Bandido made his in-ring return, defeating Bryan Keith.

On the February 22, 2025 episode of Collision, Bandido unsuccessfully challenged Jericho for the ROH World Championship. On March 9 at Revolution Zero Hour, Bandido attempted to save his brother Gravity from an attack by The Learning Tree, but was overwhelmed and was forced to watch as Jericho unmasked Gravity. On April 6 at Dynasty, Bandido defeated Jericho in a Title vs. Mask match to win the ROH World Championship for the second time. On July 11 at Supercard of Honor, Bandido successfully defended his title against Konosuke Takeshita. On July 12 at All In, Bandido competed in the men's Casino Gauntlet match, which was won by MJF.

==== Brodido (2025–present) ====
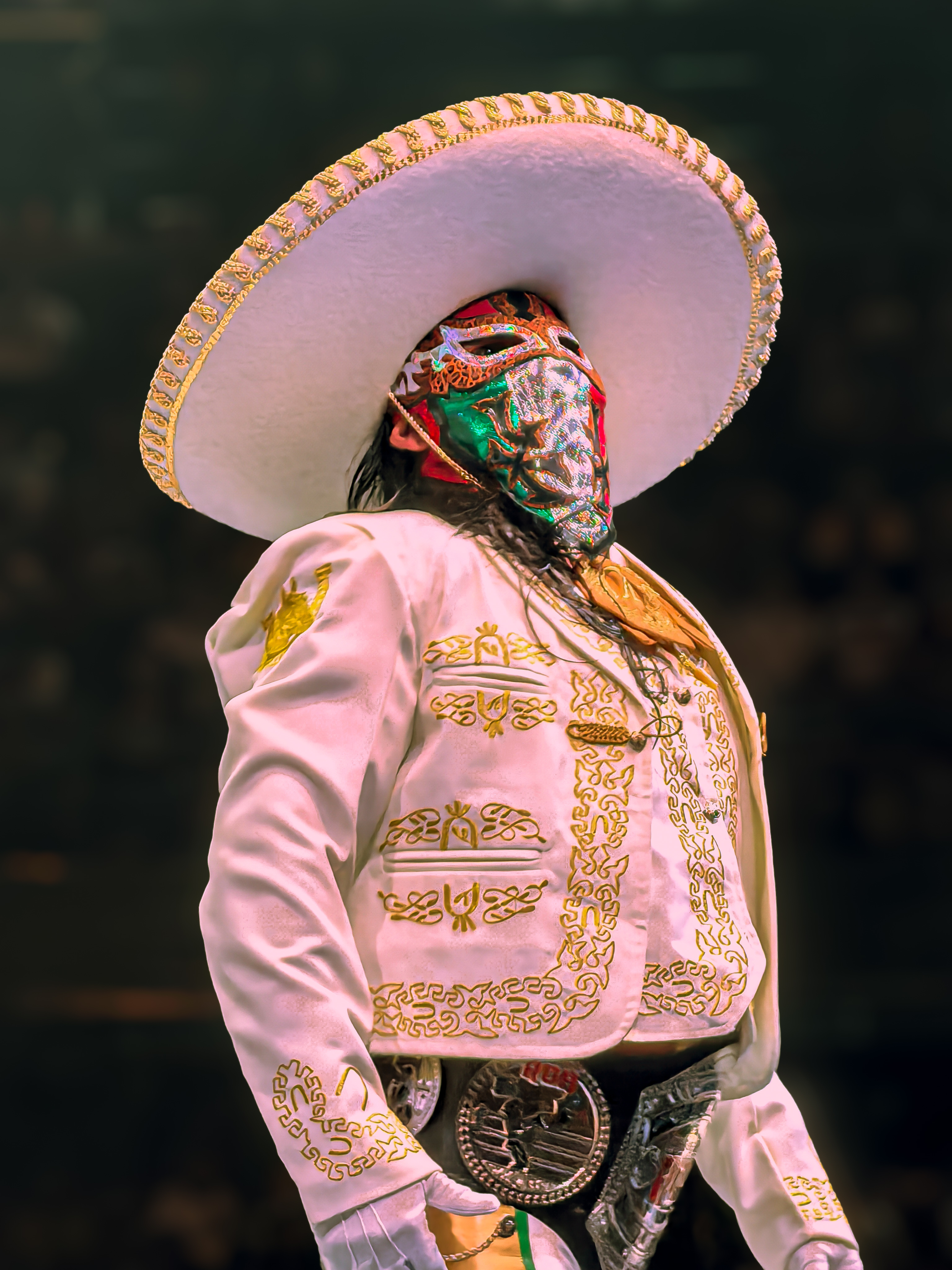
Bandido as the ROH World Champion in June 2025

On the July 31 episode of Dynamite, Bandido formed a tag team with Brody King, known as "Brodido", and the two entered a world tag title eliminator tournament, where the winners would receive a shot at the AEW World Tag Team Championships at Forbidden Door. They defeated Gates of Agony (Bishop Kaun and Toa Liona) in the first round, The Young Bucks (Matt Jackson and Nick Jackson) in the semi-finals, and wrestled FTR (Cash Wheeler and Dax Harwood) to a time-limit draw in the grand finals, meaning that both teams would advance to face reigning champions The Hurt Syndicate (Bobby Lashley and Shelton Benjamin) for the tag titles at Forbidden Door. On August 24 at Forbidden Door, Brodido defeated FTR and The Hurt Syndicate to win the AEW World Tag Team Championships. On August 29 at Death Before Dishonor, Bandido successfully defended his ROH World Championship against Hechicero. On September 20 at All Out, Brodido successfully defended their titles in a four-way Ladder match, involving The Young Bucks, Don Callis Family (Hechicero and Josh Alexander), and JetSpeed (Kevin Knight and "Speedball" Mike Bailey). On October 18 at WrestleDream, Brodido successfully defended their titles against Kazuchika Okada and Konosuke Takeshita of the Don Callis Family with Bandido pinning Okada for the win. On the following episode of Dynamite, Bandido unsuccessfully challenged Okada for the AEW Unified Championship. At Full Gear on November 22, Brodido lost their titles to FTR, ending their reign at 90 days. On December 24 at Dynamite on 34th Street, Bandido defeated Ricochet to win the Dynamite Diamond Ring and earning a shot at the AEW World Championship at Dynamite: Maximum Carnage.

On January 14, 2026 at Dynamite: Maximum Carnage, Bandido unsuccessfully challenged MJF for the AEW World Championship.At Supercard of Honor on May 15, Bandido successfully defended his title against Blake Christian and was attacked afterwards by Swerve Strickland. At Double or Nothing on May 24, Bandido competed in the Owen Hart Cup but was eliminated by Strickland in the quarterfinal. Over the following months, Bandido would challenge for the AEW Continental Championship and AEW International Championship.On August 5 at Grand Slam Mexico, Brodido teamed with Adam Page to defeat The Demand (Ricochet, Bishop Kaun, and Toa Liona) to win the AEW World Trios Championship, but lost their titles 25 days later at All In on August 30 in a Trios Roulette Royale to Swerve Strickland and The New Level (Kofi and Austin Creed). They failed to regain the titles from Strickland and the New Level at All Out on September 26, but defeated them at WrestleDream on October 17 in a two out of three falls match 2-1 to begin their second reign. They lost the titles back to Strckland and New Level in a Texas Death match at Full Gear on November 14, ending their second reign at 28 days.

=== New Japan Pro Wrestling (2019) ===
Bandido made his New Japan Pro-Wrestling (NJPW) debut on May 13, 2019, in a tag team match that also involved Rocky Romero and Yuya Uemura losing to the team of Jado, Robbie Eagles and El Phantasmo. He participated in the Best of the Super Juniors 27 tournament, where he defeated Douki, Ren Narita, Ryusuke Taguchi, Robbie Eagles, and Rocky Romero, but lost to El Phantasmo, Yoh, Will Ospreay, and Bushi, ending up with ten points overall.

=== Consejo Mundial de Lucha Libre (2019–2021) ===
Bandido made his debut for the Mexican promotion Consejo Mundial de Lucha Libre (CMLL) following a brief stint in 2016 as part of CMLL's 2019 Leyendas Mexicanas supercard show. Bandido, Volador Jr. and Valiente defeated Nueva Generacion Dinamitas (El Cuatrero, Sansón and Forastero). For the 2020 Torneo Nacional de Parejas Increíbles ("National Incredible Teams" tournament), he teamed up with rival Último Guerrero. In the storyline of their tournament participation, the two collaborated for the first two rounds, defeating Flyer and Hechicero in the first round and Diamante Azul/Gilbert el Boricua in the second. During the semi-final match Guerrero accidentally hit Bandido, leading to the team's loss to Carístico and Forastero. Bandido would leave CMLL on April 10, 2021.

=== Return to AAA (2021–2023) ===
On December 4, 2021 at Triplemanía Regia II, Bandido returned to AAA as a participant in a five-way match for the vacant AAA Mega Championship, which was won by El Hijo del Vikingo.

In June 2023, it was reported by Wrestling Observer Newsletter that Bandido would be leaving AAA.

=== Return to CMLL (2025–present) ===
On June 17, 2025, Bandido made his return to CMLL after four years at Martes de Arena Mexico, where he successfully defended his ROH World Championship against Máscara Dorada. Three days later at Fantastica Mania Mexico, Bandido teamed with Hologram to defeat Místico and Dorada. On the September 12 episode of Viernes Espectacular, Brodido successfully defended their AEW World Tag Team Championship against Galeon Fantasma (Difunto and Zandokan Jr.). On January 18, 2026 at Fin De Semana Internacional, Bandido unsuccessfully challenged Templario for the CMLL World Middleweight Championship. On September 18 at the CMLL 93rd Anniversary Show, Bandido was defeated by Soberano Jr..

== Persona and wrestling style ==
X-Knee

A version of the 21 Plex

Bandido using some of his signature moves to defeat Amazing Red in 2026

Bandido's wrestling style combines the lucha libre style with power moves not usually associated with someone his height or size.

Two of his signature moves include the "X Knee" and the "21 Plex", a rolling version of a german suplex.

== Championships and accomplishments ==
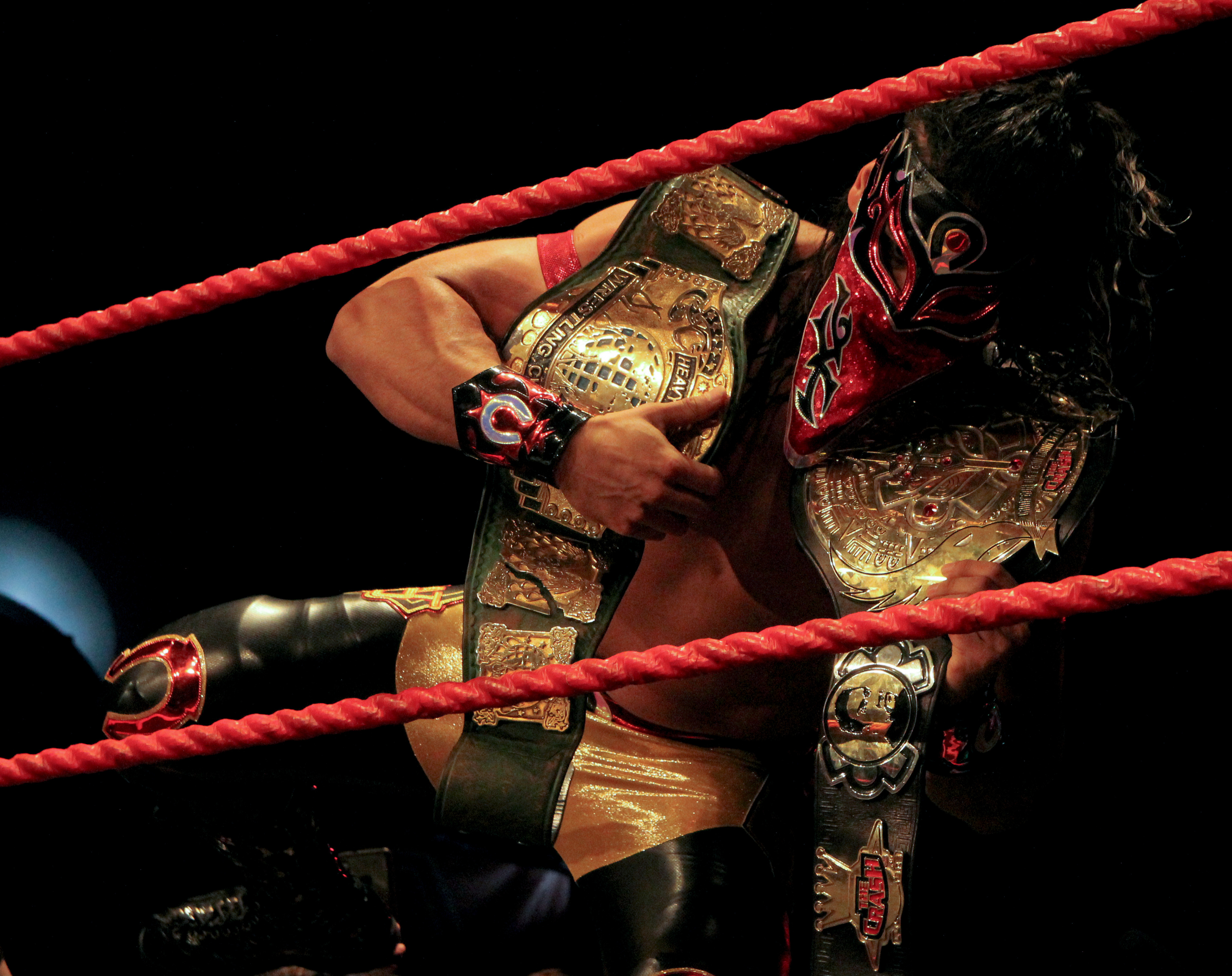
Bandido at 16 Carat Gold, with PWG World Championship and The Crash Heavyweight Championship

Bandido is a two-time ROH World Champion

...a two-time AEW World Trios Champion alongside Brody King and Adam Page (pictured).

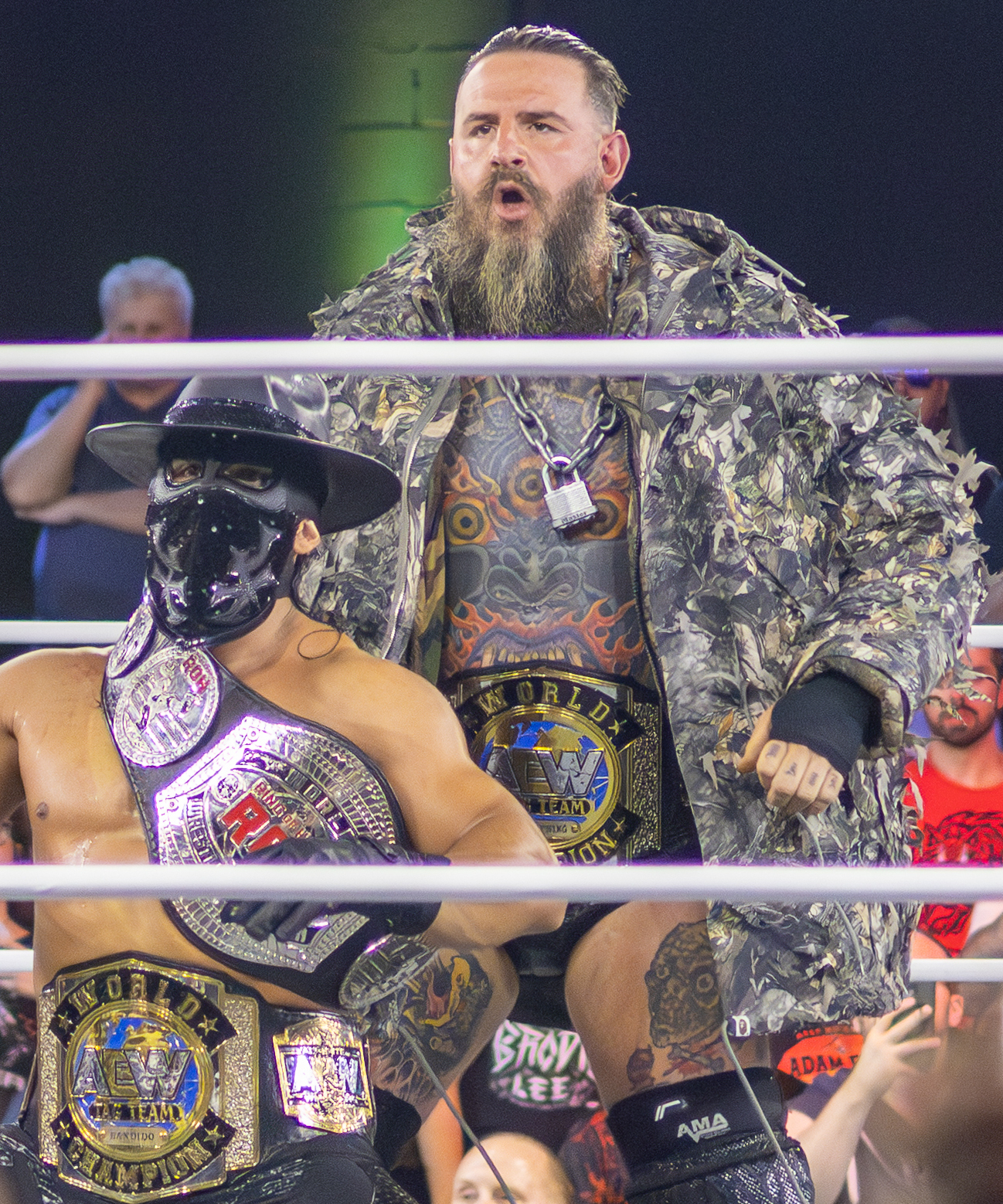
.... and a one-time AEW World Tag Team Champion with Brody King

- All Elite Wrestling
  - AEW World Tag Team Championship (1 time) – with Brody King
  - AEW World Trios Championship (2 times) – with Adam Page and Brody King
  - Dynamite Diamond Ring (2025)
- Big Lucha
  - Big Lucha World Championship (1 time, inaugural)
  - Big Lucha World Title Block- B Tournament (2022)
- BodyZoi Wrestling
  - BodyZoi Championship (1 time)
- The Crash Lucha Libre
  - The Crash Cruiserweight Championship (1 time)
  - The Crash Heavyweight Championship (1 time)
  - The Crash Tag Team Championship (1 time) – with Flamita
  - Second The Crash Lucha Libre Triple Crown Champion
- RIOT Lucha Libre
  - RIOT Championship (1 time, current)
  - La Rina Tournament (2025)
- DDT Pro-Wrestling
  - Ironman Heavymetalweight Championship (1 time)
- Elite Canadian Championship Wrestling
  - ECCW Championship (1 time)
- ESPN
  - Ranked No. 18 of the 30 best Pro Wrestlers Under 30 in 2023
- Generación XXI
  - Torneo Gran Alternativa (2017) – with Laredo Kid
- Lucha Libre Elite
  - Elite Welterweight Championship (1 time, inaugural)
- Pro Wrestling Guerrilla
  - PWG World Championship (1 time)
  - Battle of Los Angeles (2019)
- Pro Wrestling Illustrated
  - Ranked No. 11 of the top 500 singles wrestlers in the PWI 500 in 2026
- Progress Wrestling
  - Progress Tag Team Championship (1 time) – with Flamita
- Lucha Memes
  - Battle of Coacalco (2019)
- Alianza Metropolitana De Lucha Libre
  - AMLL Welterweight Championship (1 times)
- Ring of Honor
  - ROH World Championship (2 times, current)
  - ROH World Six-Man Tag Team Championship (1 time) – with Rey Horus and Flamita
  - Survival of the Fittest (2021, 2025)
  - ROH Year-End Award (1 time)
    - Best Finisher (2020) 21 Plex
- World Wrestling Association
  - WWA World Welterweight Championship (1 time)

== Luchas de Apuestas record ==
Winner (wager)	Loser (wager)	Location	Event	Date	Notes
Bandido (mask)	Chris Jericho (championship)	Philadelphia, Pennsylvania	Dynasty	April 6, 2025	
