= Gravity (wrestler) =

Mexican professional wrestler

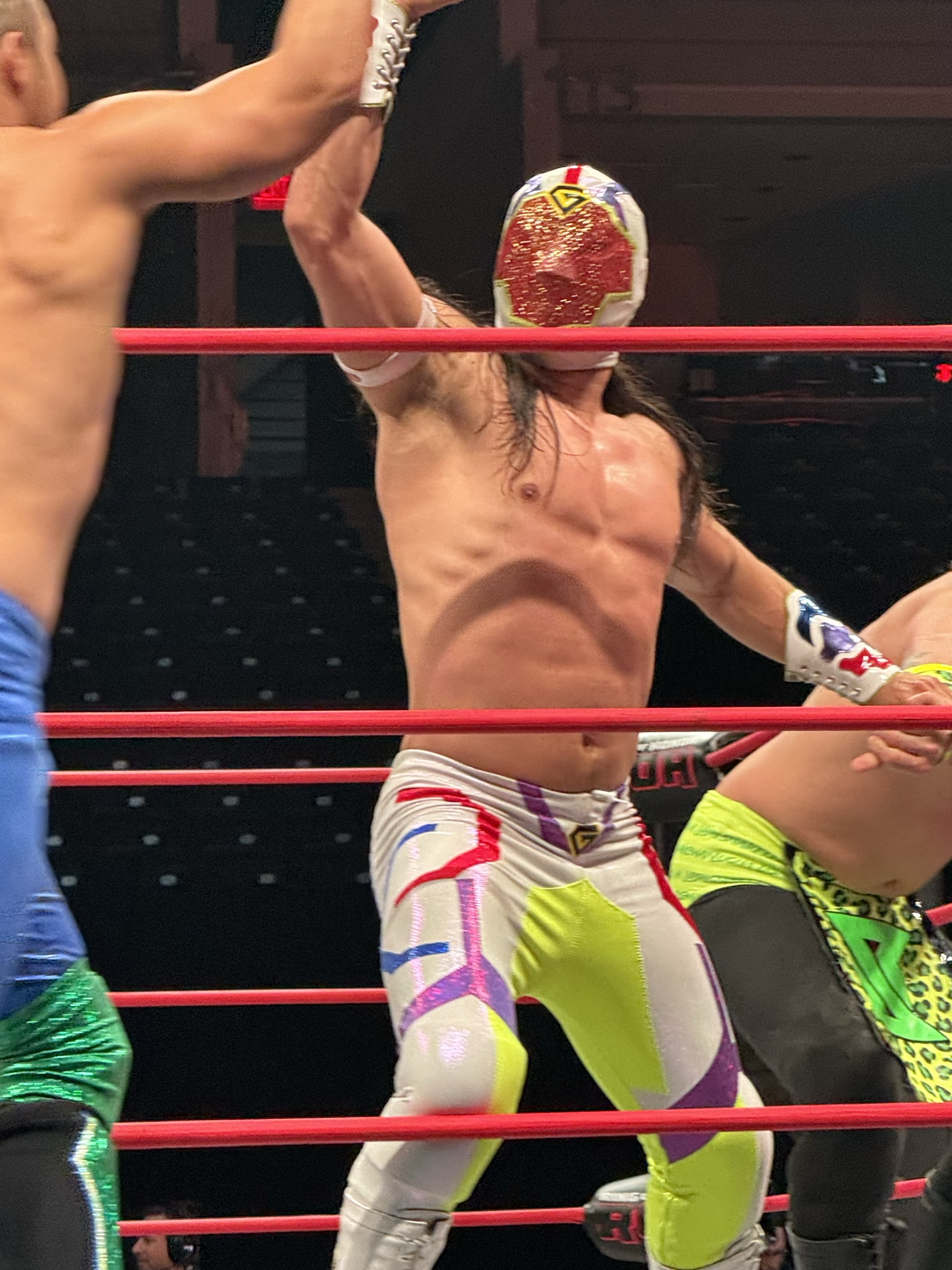
- Gravity in 2023.

Personal information
- Born: August 31, 1997 (age 28) Torreon, Coahuila, Mexico
- Family: Bandido (brother); Magia Blanca (cousin); Myzteziz Jr.(cousin)

Professional wrestling career
- Ring name: Gravity
- Billed from: Torreon, Coahuila, Mexico
- Trained by: Bandido; Ricky Marvin; Skayde
- Debut: 2020

Gravity (born August 8, 1997) is a Mexican professional wrestler. He is working for the American promotion All Elite Wrestling (AEW) and its sister promotion Ring of Honor (ROH). He has worked for Mexican promotion Lucha Libre AAA Worldwide. His older brother Bandido and his cousins Magia Blanca and Myzteziz Jr. are also professional wrestlers.

Just like his older brother, his relatives and other masked professional wrestlers, Gravity's real name is not a matter of public record as is often the case with masked wrestlers in Mexico.

== Professional wrestling career ==
=== Early career (2020–2023) ===
Gravity made his professional wrestling debut in his native Mexico in 2020.

=== All Elite Wrestling / Ring of Honor (2023–present) ===
He made his All Elite Wrestling debut on January 28, 2023, losing to Kip Sabian on AEW Dark. He later made his Ring of Honor debut on June 6, 2023, in a loss to Rey Fenix, before making his pay-per-view debut at Death Before Dishonor on July 21, defeating Komander.

On July 26, 2023, he made his AEW Dynamite debut losing to Pac. He would continue to make appearances throughout 2023, including a loss against Samoa Joe on AEW Collision on July 29, and various appearances on Ring of Honor's Honor Club. Gravity was released from AEW on April 1, 2024.

On the February 21, 2025 edition of Honor Club, Gravity returned to ROH, losing to Dark Panther. On March 9 at Revolution Zero Hour, Gravity was scheduled to challenge Chris Jericho for the ROH World Championship, but the match never started due to Jericho's stable The Learning Tree attacking Gravity and unmasking him. On April 6 at Dynasty, Gravity appeared to prevent Bryan Keith from interfering in the title match between Bandido and Jericho. He later appeared in the ring with his family to celebrate Bandido's victory.

== Championships and accomplishments ==
- Lucha Libre Elite
  - Elite Welterweight Championship (1 time)
  - Elite Welterweight Title Tournament (2024)
- Loko Wrestling
  - Loko Championship (1 time)
- New Era Wrestling
  - ELL Cruiserweight Championship (1 time)
- Other Titles
  - DWW Light Heavyweight Championship (1 time, current)
