= Cassandro =

Mexican and North American professional wrestler

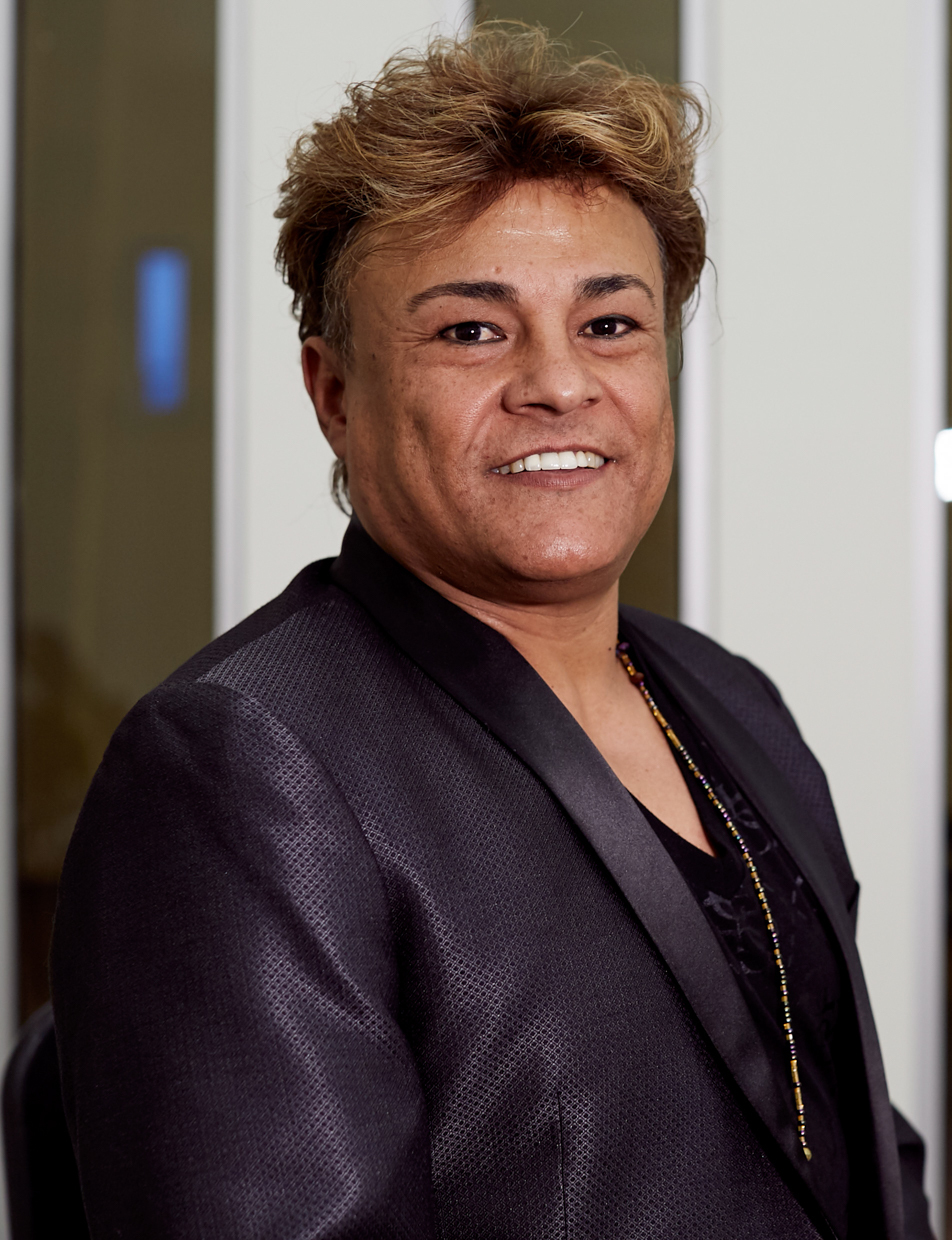
- Cassandro in 2019

Personal information
- Born: Saúl Armendáriz; May 20, 1970 (age 56) El Paso, Texas, United States

Professional wrestling career
- Ring name(s): Andromeda; Cassandro; Cassandro el Exotico; Mister Romano; Rosa Salvaje; Satanico del Exotico
- Billed height: 1.66 m (5 ft 5 1/2 in)
- Billed weight: 77 kg (170 lb)
- Billed from: Juárez, Chihuahua
- Trained by: Rey Misterio Sr. Victor Ojeda
- Debut: 1988
- Retired: 2022

Saúl Armendáriz (born May 20, 1970) is an American-born Mexican professional wrestler, who works as an exótico for several independent promotions all over the world under the ring name Cassandro. He is a former NWA World Welterweight and UWA World Lightweight Champion. In 2009, Armendáriz signed a contract with American promotion Total Nonstop Action Wrestling (TNA), but was released before making his official debut.

== Early life ==
Armendáriz was born and raised in El Paso, Texas, but also spent a lot of time just across the Mexican border in Ciudad Juárez, Chihuahua, his family's native city. At the age of fifteen, Armendáriz quit school and began training lucha libre in Juárez.

== Professional wrestling career ==
He officially began his professional wrestling career in 1988, working under a mask as Mister Romano. The character, made up by well known professional wrestler Rey Misterio, was a gladiator themed rudo (villain). Less than a year later, Armendáriz was encouraged to abandon the character and take on a new exótico character by Babe Sharon. Exóticos are male wrestlers dressed in drag portraying gay caricatures. While most exóticos were straight, both Sharon and Armendáriz were gay. Armendáriz wrestled his first match as an exótico in Juárez, working unmasked and under the new ring name Rosa Salvaje ("Wild Rose").

=== Universal Wrestling Association (1989–1995) ===
In late 1989, Armendáriz joined the Mexican Universal Wrestling Association (UWA) promotion, where he formed a new partnership with fellow exótico Pimpinela Escarlata, whom he had first met when the two were trained together in Juárez. Eventually, Armendáriz decided to change his ring name and, in order to do so, first lost the right to use his old one by losing to Johnny Vannessa in a Lucha de Apuestas (bet match). He then adopted the new ring name Cassandro, which he took from a Tijuana brothel keeper named Cassandra, whom he adored.

On January 28, 1991, after a negative backlash to reports that he was going to get to wrestler El Hijo del Santo for the UWA World Welterweight Championship, Armendáriz attempted suicide by cutting his wrists with a razor blade, but was saved by Escarlata, who found him in the bathroom. The title match happened a week later and Armendáriz credits it as the match that earned him the lucha libre community's acceptance. Though Cassandro failed to win the UWA World Welterweight Championship from El Hijo del Santo, he managed to win his first title, the UWA World Lightweight Championship, on October 29, 1992, by defeating Lasser, becoming the first exótico in history to hold a championship in UWA. After a twenty-month reign, he would lose the title to El Seminarista. He would wrestle for UWA until 1995, when the promotion closed its doors, and began then wrestling on the independent circuit for promotions both in Mexico and the United States. Around this time, Armendáriz began abusing drugs and alcohol, which started to affect his professional wrestling career. Through spiritualism, he finally found sobriety on June 4, 2003, a date which is tattooed on his back.

=== Lucha Libre AAA World Wide (2005–2008) ===
After several quiet years, Cassandro returned to mainstream lucha libre in December 2005 by joining top Mexican promotion Lucha Libre AAA World Wide (AAA), starting a rivalry with former partner Pimpinela Escarlata. The big grudge match between Cassandro and Escarlata took place on May 18, 2006, and ended in a no contest, after which the two competitors agreed to a Hair vs. Hair match at a future date. On June 18 at Triplemanía XIV, Cassandro led a four-man team to face Escarlata's team in an eight-man tag team match, which ended in another no contest. Shortly afterwards, Cassandro suffered an injury, which led to him leaving AAA and returning to the independent circuit. A year later on July 15, 2007, at Triplemanía XV, Cassandro made a one night return to AAA, teaming with Alfa, Mini Abismo Negro and Faby Apache to defeat Escarlata, Cynthia Moreno, El Oriental and Octagóncito. Three months later, Cassandro began again wrestling regularly for AAA, now working as a técnico, teaming with Escarlata against the rudo exótico stable Los Night Queens (Jessy, Nygma, Polvo de Estrellas and Yuriko). Eventually, Cassandro and Escarlata formed the stable Los Exoticos with May Flowers and Pasión Cristal to even out the numbers between the rival groups.

=== Independent circuit (2008–2022) ===
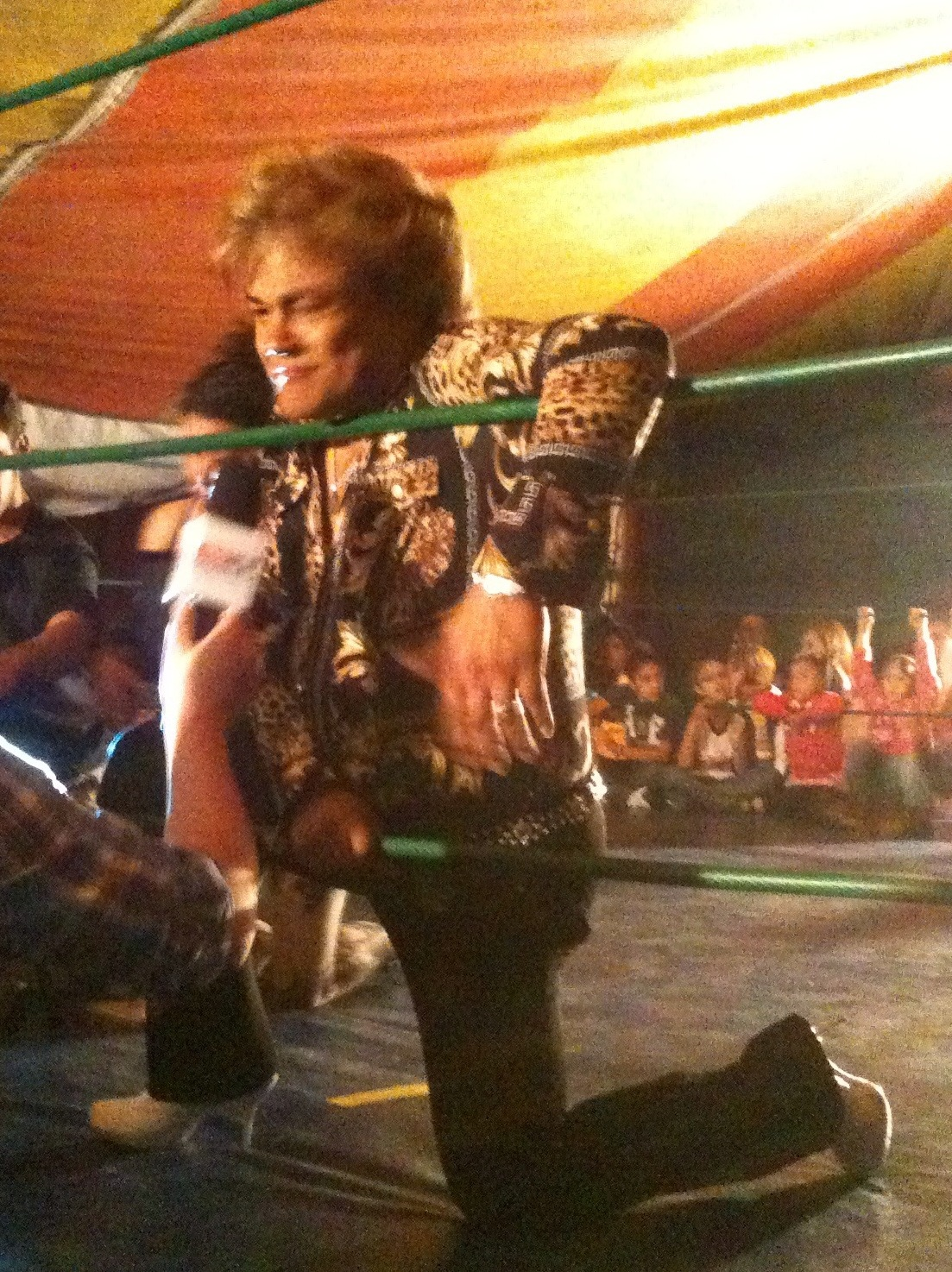
Cassandro in 2012

After once again leaving AAA in April 2008, Cassandro began working for promotions such as National Wrestling Alliance (NWA), Perros del Mal Producciones (PdM), Independent Wrestling Association Mid-South (IWA-MS) and in early 2009 signed a contract with American promotion Total Nonstop Action Wrestling (TNA). Armandariz made his TNA debut on January 27, 2009, working under the ring name Satanico del Exotico in a dark match, where he defeated Petey Williams. In March, TNA began promoting Armandariz's upcoming debut under the new ring name Andromeda. However, after several months of inactivity with the promotion, it was reported in August that Armendáriz and TNA had parted ways. Armendáriz publicly blamed his departure on homophobia. On April 3, 2010, Cassandro made his debut for Ring of Honor (ROH), defeating Rhett Titus at The Big Bang! pay-per-view. During the match, Armendáriz broke his leg, which forced him to pull out of Chikara's King of Trios tournament later that same month. On June 25, 2011, NWA Mexico, while touring the United Kingdom, set up a match to determine the first NWA World Welterweight Champion since getting the title back from Consejo Mundial de Lucha Libre (CMLL). In the match Cassandro defeated Dr. Cerebro to win the championship.

On October 9, 2011, at Héroes Inmortales, Cassandro made his return to AAA, saving Pimpinela Escarlata from exóticos Nygma, Pasión Cristal and Polvo de Estrellas, who had recently started a storyline rivalry with Escarlata based on their envy of the new Reina de Reinas Champion. Cassandro wrestled his AAA return match on November 5, teaming with Escarlata and La Braza in a six-man tag team match, where they defeated Nygma, Pasión Cristal and Yuriko. On February 17, 2012, Armendáriz announced he was taking an indefinite hiatus from professional wrestling. It was later revealed that Armendáriz had torn his anterior cruciate ligament and meniscus and would have to undergo surgery, which would sideline him from professional wrestling for ten to twelve months. Cassandro returned to the ring in early 2013. On March 16, 2013, Cassandro took part in Ray Mendoza Jr.'s retirement event, where he teamed up with El Hijo de Pirata Morgan to compete in a Ruleta de la Muerte, a losers advance tag team tournament. The duo lost to Máscara Año 2000 and Rayo de Jalisco Jr. in the first round and to El Solar and Toscano in the second round qualifying them for the finals, where the losing team would be forced to either unmask or have their hair shaved off. The team faced, and lost, to the team of Villano IV and Ray Mendoza Jr., which meant Cassandro had to have his hair shaved off, while El Hijo de Pirata Morgan had to unmask as is traditional with Lucha de Apuestas losses.

== Other media ==
Through his regular tours of the United Kingdom and his fluency in English, Cassandro has gained some mainstream attention in the country, including being interviewed on BBC Breakfast. In February 2017, Cassandro appeared in a skit on Conan, training Conan O'Brien and Andy Richter to become luchadores. He was featured in a 2016 New Yorker article entitled "How the Drag Queen Cassandro Became a Star of Mexican Wrestling."

He is the subject of the 2018 documentary film Cassandro the Exotico!, by Marie Losier. In 2023, the film Cassandro was made based on his life.

== Personal life ==
On May 7, 2021, he had a brain embolism removed.

Armendáriz is openly gay.

== Championships and accomplishments ==
- Lucha Libre AAA Worldwide
  - AAA Hall of Fame (2023)
- NWA Mexico
  - NWA World Welterweight Championship (1 time)
- Universal Wrestling Association
  - UWA World Lightweight Championship (1 time)
- Other titles
  - Chikara Welterweight Championship (1 time)^{1}

^{1}Championship not recognized by Chikara.

== Luchas de Apuestas record ==
Winner (wager)	Loser (wager)	Location	Event	Date	Notes
Johnny Vannessa (name)	Rosa Salvaje (name)	N/A	N/A	N/A	
Cassandro (hair) and Pimpinela Escarlata (hair)	Dragon Chino I (mask) and Dragon Chino II (mask)	N/A	N/A	N/A	
Cassandro (hair) and Pimpinela Escarlata (hair)	Dragon Chino I (hair) and Dragon Chino II (hair)	N/A	N/A	N/A	
Cassandro (hair)	Profeta (mask)	N/A	N/A	N/A	
Cassandro (hair)	Profeta (hair)	N/A	N/A	N/A	
Cassandro (hair)	Halcon Dorado (hair)	N/A	N/A	N/A	
Cassandro (hair)	Misterioso (hair)	N/A	N/A	N/A	
Cassandro (hair)	Bello Armando (hair)	N/A	N/A	N/A	
Cassandro (hair)	Peluchin (hair)	N/A	N/A	N/A	
Cassandro (hair)	El Galactico (hair)	N/A	N/A	N/A	
Lady Apache (hair)	Cassandro (hair)	Ciudad Juárez, Chihuahua	Live event	May 26, 2002	(Note: Six person tag team steel cage match, where Cassandro, May Flowers and Pimpinela Escarlata faced Apache, Tiffany and Yahaira.)
Cassandro (hair)	Ruby Gardenia (hair)	Los Angeles, California	Live event	June 22, 2006	
El Hijo del Santo (mask)	Cassandro (hair)	Los Angeles, California	Live event	July 14, 2007	(Note: Steel cage match, which also included Gran Hamada, El Hijo de Rey Misterio, L.A. Park, Nicho el Millonario, Pentagon Black and Rey Misterio, Sr.)
Ray Mendoza Jr. (hair) and Villano IV (mask)	Cassandro (hair) and El Hijo de Pirata Morgan (mask)	Naucalpan, Mexico State	Live event	March 16, 2013	(Note: Finals of a Ruleta de la Muerte tournament at the Rey Mendoza Jr. retirement show.)
Peluchin Maldad (mask)	Cassandro (hair)	El Paso, Texas	Live event	April 24, 2016	

== See also ==
- List of exóticos
