= List of exóticos =

An exótico is a lucha libre style professional wrestler who performs in drag. Most exóticos are Mexican, but some foreign wrestlers have also adopted the practise.

== Performers ==
Stage name	Real name	Nationality	Notes
Adorable Rubí	Ruben Carbajal Lopez	Mexican	
La Braza	Juan Alvarado Nieves	Mexican	
Cassandro	Saúl Armendáriz	American	
Rico Constantino	Americo Sebastiano Constantino	American	
Chi Chi	Allan Funk	American	
Dizzy Davis	Sterling Blake Davis	American	
Dulce Gardenia	Javier Márquez Gómez	Mexican	
Estrella Divina	Brando Fernández	Mexican	
Mamba	Federico Vera	Mexican	
Máximo	José Christian Alvarado Ruiz	Mexican	
Nygma	Unknown	Mexican	
Pasión Kristal	José Gabriel Zentella Damián	Mexican	
Pimpinela Escarlata	Mario González Lozano	Mexican	
Sonny Kiss	Sunny Aziza Tate	American	
Yosuke Santa Maria	Yosuke Watanabe	Japanese	
Zacarias el Perico	Unknown	Mexican	

== See also ==
- List of drag queens
- List of drag kings
