= WWA World Welterweight Championship =

Professional wrestling championship

WWA World Welterweight Championship (Campeonato Mundial de Peso Welter WWA)

Details
- Promotion: World Wrestling Association (WWA)
- Date established: 1987
- Current champion: Bandido
- Date won: September 28, 2017
Statistics
- First champion: Negro Casas
- Most reigns: El Hijo del Santo (10 reigns)
- Longest reign: Bandido (2238+ days)
- Shortest reign: Tornado Negro(>1 day)

The WWA World Welterweight Championship (Campeonato Mundial de Peso Welter WWA in Spanish) is a Mexican professional wrestling championship promoted by the Mexican Lucha Libre wrestling based promotion World Wrestling Association (WWA) since 1987. The official definition of the Welterweight weight class in Mexico is between 70 kg (150 lb) and 77 kg (170 lb), but is not always strictly enforced. (Note: The most recent case of this is Mephisto holding the CMLL World Welterweight Championship, a belt with a 78 kg (172 lb) upper limit despite weighing 90 kg (200 lb).) Because Lucha Libre emphasizes the lower weight classes, this division is considered more important than the normally more prestigious heavyweight division of a promotion.

As it was a professional wrestling championship, the championship was not won not by actual competition, but by a scripted ending to a match determined by the bookers and match makers. (Note: Hornbaker (2016) p. 550: "Professional wrestling is a sport in which match finishes are predetermined. Thus, win–loss records are not indicative of a wrestler's genuine success based on their legitimate abilities – but on now much, or how little they were pushed by promoters") On occasion the promotion declares a championship vacant, which means there is no champion at that point in time. This can either be due to a storyline, (Note: Duncan & Will (2000) p. 271, Chapter: Texas: NWA American Tag Team Title [World Class, Adkisson] "Championship held up and rematch ordered because of the interference of manager Gary Hart") or real life issues such as a champion suffering an injury being unable to defend the championship, (Note: Duncan & Will (2000) p. 20, Chapter: (United States: 19th Century & widely defended titles – NWA, WWF, AWA, IW, ECW, NWA) NWA/WCW TV Title "Rhodes stripped on 85/10/19 for not defending the belt after having his leg broken by Ric Flair and Ole & Arn Anderson") or leaving the company. (Note: Duncan & Will (2000) p. 201, Chapter: (Memphis, Nashville) Memphis: USWA Tag Team Title "Vacant on 93/01/18 when Spike leaves the USWA.")

It was first won by Negro Casas in 1987 and had been defended not only in Mexico but Europe, Japan and the United States as well. The title was held by many of the top cruiserweight wrestlers of the 1990s including Heavy Metal, Psicosis, Juventud Guerrera, Rey Misterio, Jr. and Eddie Guerrero. El Hijo del Santo holds the record for most title reigns with ten reigns. The current champion is El Hijo de Rey Misterio II.

== Title history ==
Key
No.	Overall reign number
Reign	Reign number for the specific champion
Days	Number of days held
N/A	Unknown information
†	Championship change is unrecognized by the promotion
+	Current reign is changing daily

No.	Champion	Championship change			Reign statistics		Notes	Ref.
No.	Champion	Date	Event	Location	Reign	Days	Notes	Ref.
1	Negro Casas	1987	Live event	(Note: The location of the title change was not captured as part of the championship documentation.)	1	(Note: The exact date on which Negro Casas won the title is unknown, placing his title reign between 470 and 834 days.)		(Note: Duncan & Will (2000) p. 400, Chapter: "Mexico: WWA Welterweight Title")
2	Tornado Negro	April 14, 1989	Live event	Tijuana, Mexico	1	0		
3	Negro Casas	April 14, 1989	Live event	Apatlaco, Morelos	2	(Note: The exact date on which Negro Casas lost the title is unknown, placing his title reign between 1 and 169 days.)		
4	Fuerza Guerrera	(Note: The exact date Fuerza Guerrea won the championship has not been documented, only that he won the championship in this time period.)	Live event		1	(Note: The exact date on which Fuerza Guerrera won and lost the title is unknown, placing his title reign between 1 day and 168 days.)		
5	Blue Demon Jr.	September 1989	Live event		1	(Note: The exact date on which Blue Demon Jr. won and lost the title is unknown, placing his title reign between 1 and 278 days.)		
6	Fuerza Guerrera		Live event	N/A	6	(Note: The exact date on which Fuerza Guerrero won and lost the title is unknown, placing the title reign between 1 and 249 days.)		
7	El Hijo del Santo	June 7, 1990	Live event	Tokyo, Japan	1	(Note: The exact date on which El Hijo del Santo vacated the title is unknown, placing his title reign between 512 and 541 days.)		
—	Vacated	November 1991	—	—	—	—	Championship vacated for unknown reasons	
Championship history is unrecorded from November 1991 to 1992.
8	Eddie Guerrero	1992	Live event		1	(Note: The exact date on which Eddie Guerrero won the title is unknown, placing his title reigns between −181 and 59 days.)		
9	Piloto Suicida	August 29, 1992	Live event	Los Angeles, California	1	9		
10	Espanto Jr.	September 7, 1992	Live event	Querétaro, Mexico	1	193		
11	El Hijo del Santo	March 19, 1993	Live event	Tijuana, Mexico	2	56		
12	Heavy Metal	May 14, 1993	Live event	Mexico City	1	(Note: The exact date on which Heavy Metal lost the title is unknown, placing his title reign between 1 and 277 days.)		
13	El Hijo del Santo	June 1993	Live event		3	(Note: The exact date on which El Hijo del Santo won the title is unknown, placing his title reign between 47 and 276 days.)		
14	Psicosis	February 16, 1994	Live event	Aguascalientes, Mexico	1	583		
15	Rey Misterio Jr.	September 22, 1995	Live event	Mexico City	1	6		
16	Psicosis	September 28, 1995	Live event	Mexicali, Mexico	2	1		
17	Rey Misterio Jr.	September 29, 1995	Live event	Tijuana, Mexico	2	212		
18	Juventud Guerrera	April 28, 1996	Live event	Querétaro, Mexico	1	83		
19	Rey Misterio Jr.	July 20, 1996	WAR's 4th Anniversary Show	Tokyo, Japan	3	216		
20	El Hijo del Santo	February 21, 1997	Live event	Tijuana, Mexico	4	133		
21	El Felino	July 4, 1997	Live event	Mexico City	1	96		
22	El Hijo del Santo	October 8, 1997	Live event	Leon, Mexico	5	115		
23	El Felino	January 31, 1998	Live event	Mexico City	1	36		
—	Vacated	March 8, 1998	—	—	—	—	Championship held up after inconclusive match between El Hijo del Santo and El Felino	
24	El Hijo del Santo	July 13, 1998	Live event	Puebla, Puebla	6		Defeated Felino in rematch.	
Championship history is unrecorded from July 13, 1998 to April 9, 2000.
25	Blue Panther	April 9, 2000	Live event	Monterrey, Mexico	1	(Note: The exact date on which Blue Panther lost the title is unknown, placing the title reign between 53 and 82 days.)		
26	El Hijo del Santo	May 28, 2000	Live event		7	179		
27	El Hijo del Diablo	November 23, 2000	Live event	Iguala, Mexico	1	707		
28	El Hijo del Santo	October 31, 2002	Live event	San Luis Potosí, Mexico	8	817		
29	El Cobarde	January 25, 2005	Live event	Juarez, Mexico	1	227		
30	El Hijo del Santo	September 9, 2005	Live event	Ciudad Juarez, Mexico	9			
Championship history is unrecorded from September 9, 2005 to July 2, 2008.
31	Blue Demon Jr.		Live event	Valencia, Spain	2	3		
32	El Hijo del Santo	July 5, 2008	Live event	London, England	10	1,258		
—	Vacated	N/A	—	—	—	—	Championship vacated for undocumented reasons.	
33	El Hijo de Rey Misterio II	May 27, 2011	Live event	Mexico City, Mexico	1			
34	Ángel Blanco Jr.	December 15, 2011	Live event	Mexico City, Mexcico	1	2,114		
35	Bandido	September 28, 2017	TxT show	Tulancingo, Hidalgo	1	3,395+		
