= Myzteziz Jr. =

Mexican professional wrestler

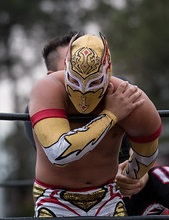
- Carmona as Myzteziz Jr. in 2019

Personal information
- Born: Carlos Leonel Ramírez Carmona; August 2, 1993 (age 32) Torreón, Coahuila, Mexico
- Family: Bandido (cousin); Magia Blanca (cousin); Gravity (cousin)

Professional wrestling career
- Ring name(s): Angelikal; Myzteziz Jr
- Billed height: 1.70 m (5 ft 7 in)
- Billed weight: 70 kg (150 lb)
- Trained by: Laredo Kid
- Debut: 2012

Carlos Leonel Ramírez Carmona (born August 2, 1993), better known by his ring name Myzteziz Jr., is a Mexican professional wrestler, previously known by the ring name Angelikal. He is signed to Lucha Libre AAA Worldwide and WWE, where he is the former AAA World Trios Champion.

A cousin of Bandido, Gravity and Magia Blanca, originally his real name was not a matter of public record as is often the case with masked wrestlers in Mexico. However due to a possible kidnapping crime in which he is being implicated, he ended up having his real identity exposed by his ex-wife and mother of their son (who was supposedly kidnapped by Myzteziz Jr.).

== Professional wrestling career ==
In 2012, Angelikal made his debut on the independent circuit teaming with Crossfire and Stukita being defeated by Dark Side and the Toxic Couple (Epidemic and Heavy Boy).

=== Lucha Libre AAA Worldwide / WWE (2017–present) ===
In 2017 Anglikal began working part-time for Lucha Libre AAA Worldwide (AAA), initially working in the first or second match of the night teaming with Charly Madrid and Tigger to defeat Angel Mortal Jr., Canibal Jr. and Tiger Boy. At Triplemanía XXV, Angelikal teamed with El Hijo del Vikingo and The Tigger to defeat Angel Mortal Jr., Tiger Boy and Villano III Jr. in the final of La Llave a la Gloria. That same night, he was named the winner of the tournament along with Ashley and El Hijo del Vikingo, but nevertheless, Director of Talent of AAA Vampiro announced that the fourteen finalists would all receive a contract with the promotion.

On November 18, 2018, Angelikal teamed up with El Hijo del Vikingo and Laredo Kid to defeat El Nuevo Poder del Norte (Carta Brava Jr., Tito Santana and Mocho Cota Jr.), that same night the trio demanded a match for the AAA World Trios Championship. In December, at Guerra de Titanes, before the fight for the titles, La Parka gave Angelikal a new mask and changed his name to Myzteziz Jr. Later, the trio defeated El Nuevo Poder del Norte to win the AAA World Trios Championship. They would go on to be known as Los Jinetes del Aire (The Air Raiders). Prior to Triplemanía XXVIII, Laredo Kid vacated the AAA World Trios Championship in order to focus on his singles career following advice from La Parka and elected Golden Magic to replace him in the trio. At the event, the trio won the vacant AAA World Trios Championship in a three-way match which included El Nuevo Poder del Norte and Las Fresas Salvajes (Pimpinela Escarlata, Mamba, and Máximo). Later in the year, Golden Magic would change his gimmick to Octagon Jr. At the 2019 Guerra de Titanes, Myzteziz Jr. and El Hijo del Vikingo unsuccessfully challenged AAA World Tag Team Champions Lucha Brothers (Fénix and Pentagón Jr.) in a match that also included Australian Suicide and Rey Horus. On February 22, 2020, Los Jinetes del Aire successfully defended the AAA World Trios Championship against Los Mercenarios (La Hiedra, Rey Escorpión and Taurus). The trio made a second successful defence on the May 2 episode of Major League Wrestling's Fusion against Injustice (Jordan Oliver, Kotto Brazil and Myron Reed).

== In other media ==
In the late summer of 2019 Myzteziz Jr. was one of the participants in the Mexican version of the Exathlon sports reality show, Myzteziz Jr. was part of the "celebrity/athlete" Exathlon team, competing against a team of amateurs that was shown several days a week on the Mexican Azteca Uno television station.

== Personal life ==
He was in a relationship with fellow luchadora enmascarada Keyra until their contentious divorce in mid-2024.

On September 22, 2024, Keyra accused her ex-husband through social media of abducting her 2-year-old son without her consent, because Myzteziz Jr. had discharged the child from a hospital stay after a blood transfusion and took him home. Shortly after, the AMBER Alert was activated to help locate the child, which was widely shared by fans and fellow wrestlers. Keyra noted that her son was still in a delicate state of health and needed the care of his mother. In an act of desperation due to Myzteziz Jr. not disseminating his location, she also shared a photo of Myzteziz Jr.'s face in the hope that it would speed up the search. Myzteziz Jr.'s version of events was that the child was hospitalized for malnourishment due to neglect on Keyra's part, and that he was rescuing his son from further abuse. Myzteziz Jr. was ultimately granted custody of their son and an order of protection against Keyra.

== Championships and accomplishments ==
- Lucha Libre AAA Worldwide
  - AAA World Trios Championship (2 times) – with El Hijo del Vikingo and Laredo Kid (1), and El Hijo del Vikingo and Golden Magic (1)
  - Llave a la Gloria Tournament (2017) – with Ashley and El Hijo del Vikingo
- Pro Wrestling Illustrated
  - Ranked No. 296 of the top 500 singles wrestlers in the PWI 500 in 2021

== Luchas de Apuestas record ==
| Winner (wager) | Loser (wager) | Location | Event | Date | Notes |
|---|---|---|---|---|---|
| Myzteziz Jr. (mask) | Argenis (mask) | Monterrey | Triplemanía XXXI: Monterrey | April 16, 2023 | |
