= Exótico =

Professional wrestling genre

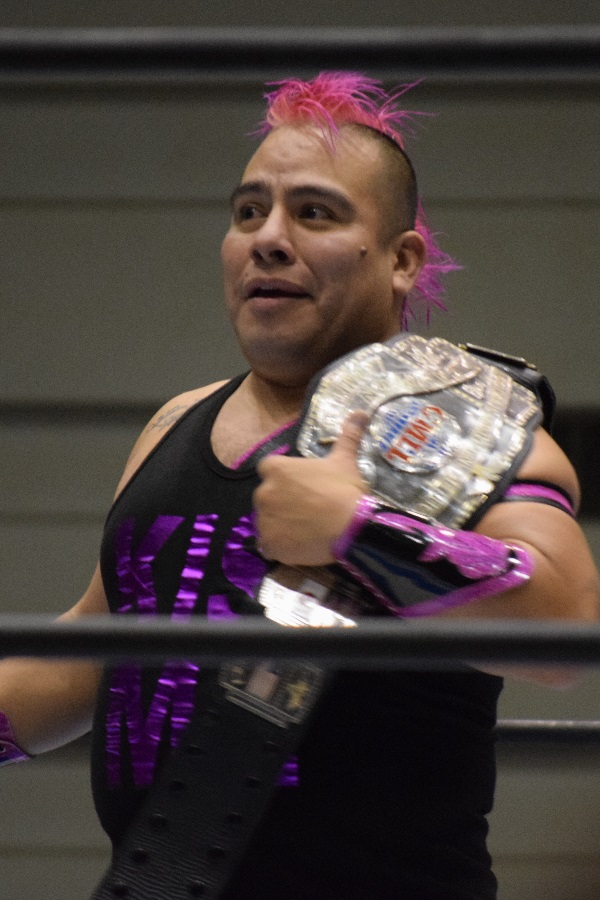
Máximo, a well-known exótico wrestler

In Mexico, an exótico (Spanish: [eɣˈsotiko]) is a male professional wrestler who fights and performs while incorporating feminine aspects in to their wrestling personas, known as "gimmicks". They are characterized by a camp style, feminine costumes, and humor. Though not all exóticos are gay, some are and some incorporate sexual ambiguity into their performance. Wearing feather boas, headdresses, sequins, or stockings, they are often seen as defying "traditional macho culture".

== Meaning ==
Lucha libre or lucha libre mexicana (translated as "freestyle wrestling") is the term used to describe the wrestling style originary from Mexico, characterized by rapid sequences of holds and maneuvers, "high-flying" aerial techniques, and colorful masks, all mixed with drama, pageantry and a physical comedy that is uniquely of Hispanic origin. Everything that a wrestlers says, does, and wears is essential to their character and their performance. There are different kind of wrestlers who represent good and evil, técnico or rudo/heel, and queers. Lucha libre is a space in which the macho-maricón (heterosexual-homosexual continuum) is represented not only in the relative positioning of men competing over who is "more" macho but also by men who have abdicated their masculinity.

Many gay wrestlers show in their performances that they may identify as a female, but can be just as strong as a male, and can deliver a great performance just like any other male wrestler. Lucha libre is a performance that is open to multiple readings on axis of representation by two men. Many matches cannot be described as a struggle between two men, because not all wrestlers are male, and not all male wrestlers are unambiguously men. A match between two men represents a rudo and a técnico (evil and good), in which most exóticos end up being rudos. This does not apply to all exóticos, but the audience usually responds to them being a rudo.

== History ==
In the 1940s, the first exóticos were seen in the history of Mexican wrestling. Initially, the category of exóticos was formed as simply an act for entertainment; it did not reflect the life of any luchador. One of the earliest acknowledged exótico was Sterling Davis, also known as Gardenia Davis (ring name). Gardenia would enter the ring by throwing gardenias at the crowd. But up until the late 1980s, exóticos claimed that the act was just an act and that it did not reflect any personal lifestyles. In the mid-1980s, two luchadores trained by Reynosa began wrestling as exóticos but unlike previous exóticos, they did not deny their homosexual identity publicly. "The exóticos changed the exótico style from a representation of a tendency to a representation of a social category and celebrated lucha libre as a means of upward mobility for themselves specifically as homosexuals".

"I love it. I come from a 'machismo' family in which many are homophobic. I've had many doors slammed in my face, but I am who I am. What you see is what you get. I'm gay, and I've had no problem saying it." Many fanatics would argue that exóticos are "not quite men", but exóticos defend themselves, the thing that maricones are thought to, by definition, not be capable of doing.

== Interpretation ==
Exóticos have been seen as figures of "contesting the dramatic representation of machismo" and compete with their opponents in the ring while also "rejecting the outward signs of manhood".

== Significance ==
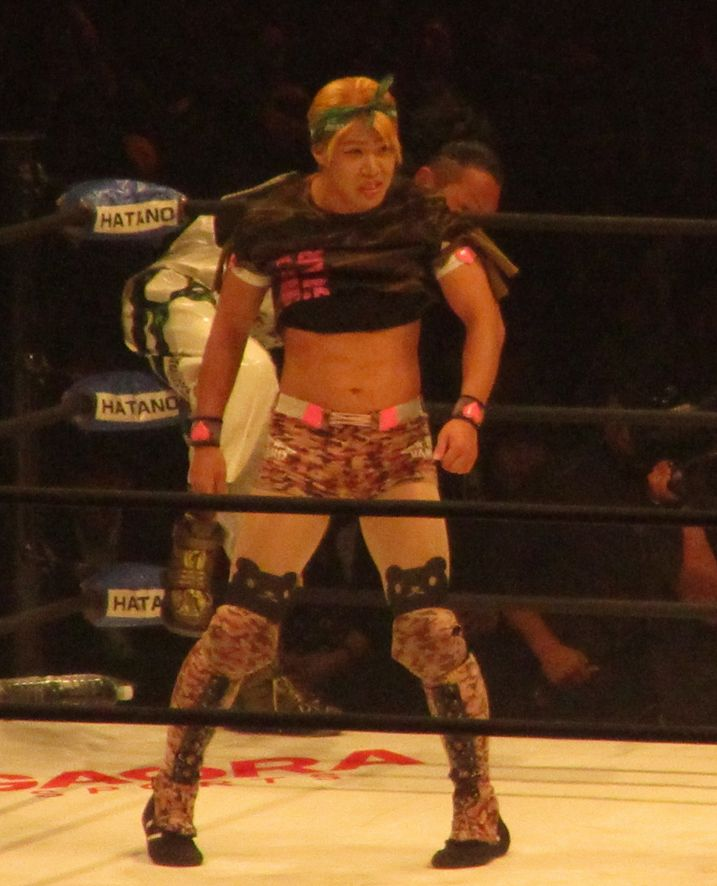
Yosuke Santa Maria, a Japanese exótico. Santa Maria adopted the persona when she joined the Millennials, a wrestling group in Japan with a lucha libre wrestling style.

Heather Levi has argued that lucha libre style's theatricality challenges mainstream machismo in Mexico in the performance of certain wrestlers, like exóticos. Exóticos challenge the traditional norms of what a man should and should not do, and challenge that idea that a maricón can not defend himself. Foremost, they also allow women to empower themselves by bringing a female presence to the ring. Although there are audience members that do not take exóticos seriously, their act has helped challenge traditional machismo and has been effective enough to even be considered a threat by "ideal" machismo.

"Exóticos then contest the production of mexicanidad as they challenge the ideal mestizo-macho heterosexual) wrestler. As such, female wrestlers also challenge wrestling's traditional performances and, while women wrestlers only fight other women and cannot literally unman male opponents in the ring, they do so culturally, since female wrestlers transgress the codes of normative femininity inside and outside the ring." Although women do not actually fight with men in the ring, they are represented by exóticos since they are openly homosexual. This allows women to empower themselves even more and have a type of vision that gives them equal rights. The biggest reason why this is seen as a threat by traditional machismo is because once these women are empowered, they realize that they have the same rights as men do, therefore disempowering machismo completely. The fact that exóticos can physically challenge a man in the ring and physically challenge male masculinity is what makes the role of exóticos so crucial to the transformation of social norms.

The outfit of an exótico is known to be different regarding its style and colors. The outfit represents different aspects of their identity and their stance against machismo, while empowering women. "Her face is covered with a silver and bright pink butterfly mask. Barraza's wrestling photograph thus juxtaposes markers of her physical strength with those of femininity, codified through butterflies and the bright pink color of her suit. In doing so, the photo creates what Anne Balsamo calls a 'gender hybrid' that invokes corporeal codes of femininity as well as of masculinity. The outfit that these men in drag sport help define their category of an exótico. They create a gender hybrid in which the masculinity of a man is blended with the femininity of a woman but in an empowered form where they can compete with social norms and be accepted in an arena.

== In Media ==
The 2023 film Cassandro is based on the life of Saúl Armendáriz, a gay wrestler who appeared as an exótico under that name from 1989.

== See also ==
- List of drag queens
- List of exóticos
- Saúl Armendáriz
