= UWA World Lightweight Championship =

- The original championship belt

Details
- Promotion: Universal Wrestling Association (UWA)
- Date established: December 21, 1975
- Current champion: Kato Kung Lee, Jr.
- Date won: May 9, 1997
Statistics
- First champion: El Matematico
- Most reigns: El Hijo del Santo (3 reigns)
- Longest reign: Kato Kung Lee, Jr. (967 days)
- Shortest reign: Rocky Santana (7 days)

The UWA World Lightweight Championship (Campeonato Mundial de Peso Ligero UWA in Spanish) is an inactive professional wrestling championship promoted by the Mexican wrestling promotion Universal Wrestling Association (UWA) from 1975 until some time around 2000 when Kato Kung Lee, Jr. stopped defending it. The official definition of the lightweight weight class in Mexico is between 63 kg (139 lb) and 70 kg (150 lb), but the weight limits are not always strictly adhered to. (Note: The most recent case of this is Mephisto, who holds the CMLL World Welterweight Championship, a belt with a 78 kg (172 lb) upper limit despite weighing 90 kg (200 lb).) The first champion was El Matematico, winning the title in December 1975. When the UWA closed in 1995 the title was vacated, but 2 years later it was brought back as an Independent circuit title when Kato Kung Lee, Jr. won it.

As it was a professional wrestling championship, the championship was not won not by actual competition, but by a scripted ending to a match determined by the bookers and match makers. (Note: Hornbaker (2016) p. 550: "Professional wrestling is a sport in which match finishes are predetermined. Thus, win–loss records are not indicative of a wrestler's genuine success based on their legitimate abilities – but on now much, or how little they were pushed by promoters") On occasion the promotion declares a championship vacant, which means there is no champion at that point in time. This can either be due to a storyline, (Note: Duncan & Will (2000) p. 271, Chapter: Texas: NWA American Tag Team Title [World Class, Adkisson] "Championship held up and rematch ordered because of the interference of manager Gary Hart") or real life issues such as a champion suffering an injury being unable to defend the championship, (Note: Duncan & Will (2000) p. 20, Chapter: (United States: 19th Century & widely defended titles – NWA, WWF, AWA, IW, ECW, NWA) NWA/WCW TV Title "Rhodes stripped on 85/10/19 for not defending the belt after having his leg broken by Ric Flair and Ole & Arn Anderson") or leaving the company. (Note: Duncan & Will (2000) p. 201, Chapter: (Memphis, Nashville) Memphis: USWA Tag Team Title "Vacant on 93/01/18 when Spike leaves the USWA.")

== Title history ==
Key
| No. | Overall reign number |
| Reign | Reign number for the specific champion |
| Days | Number of days held |

| No. | Champion | Championship change | | | Reign statistics | | Notes | Ref. |
| No. | Champion | Date | Event | Location | Reign | Days | Notes | Ref. |
|---|---|---|---|---|---|---|---|---|
| 1 | El Matematico | December 21, 1975 | UWA Show | Pachuca, Mexico | 1 | 373 | Defeated Hashi Masataka to become first champion. | (Note: Duncan & Will (2000) p. 398, Chapter: MEXICO: UWA World Lightweight Title [Flores, Mora]) |
| 2 | El Signo | December 28, 1976 | UWA Show | Mexico City | 1 | 436 | | |
| — | Vacated | March 19, 1978 | — | — | — | — | Championship vacated for undocumented reasons | |
| 3 | Black Man | September 10, 1978 | UWA Show | Mexico City | 1 | 1,116 | Defeated El Matematico to win the title. | |
| 4 | Black Terry | September 30, 1981 | UWA Show | Mexico City | 1 | (Note: The exact date on which Black Terry lost the championship is unknown, placing the title reign between 823 and 853 days.) | | |
| 5 | Negro Casas | January 1984 | UWA Show | Mexico City | 1 | (Note: The exact date on which negro Casas won the championship is unknown, placing the title reign between 271 and 301 days.) | | /> |
| 6 | El Hijo del Santo | October 28, 1984 | UWA Show | Mexico City | 1 | 249 | | |
| 7 | Aristotle I | July 14, 1985 | UWA Show | Mexico City | 1 | 49 | | |
| 8 | El Hijo del Santo | September 1, 1985 | UWA Show | Mexico City | 2 | 693 | | |
| 9 | Espanto Jr. | July 26, 1987 | UWA Show | Torreon, Mexico | 1 | 280 | | |
| 10 | El Hijo del Santo | May 1, 1988 | UWA Show | Naucalpan, State of Mexico | 3 | (Note: The exact date on which El Hijo del Santo vacated the championship is unknown, placing the title reign between 975 and 1,005 days.) | | |
| — | Vacated | January 1991 | — | — | — | — | Championship vacated when El Hijo del Santo moves up to the Welterweight division | |
| 11 | Lasser | February 5, 1991 | UWA Show | Puebla, Puebla | 1 | 579 | Defeated El Khalifa in the finals of a 24-man championship tournament to win the vacant title. | |
| 12 | Rocky Santana | September 6, 1992 | UWA Show | Tokyo, Japan | 1 | 7 | The first major title defence ever held outside Mexico. | |
| 13 | Lasser | September 9, 1992 | UWA Show | Sapporo, Japan | 2 | 50 | | |
| 14 | Cassandro | October 29, 1992 | UWA Show | Toluca, Mexico | 1 | 593 | | |
| 15 | Semanarista | June 14, 1994 | UWA Show | Querétaro, Mexico | 1 | 100 | | |
| 16 | Loco Valentino | September 22, 1994 | UWA Show | Tulancingo, Mexico | 1 | (Note: The exact date on which the championship was held is unknown, placing the title reign between 101 and 465 days.) | | |
| — | Vacated | 1995 | — | — | — | — | Championship vacated when the UWA Closes | |
| 17 | Kato Kung Lee Jr. | May 9, 1997 | Live event | Tulancingo, Mexico | 1 | 967+ | Kato Kung Lee Jr. wins the vacant title which had been inactive for two years. | |
