= El Hijo del Santo =

Mexican professional wrestler

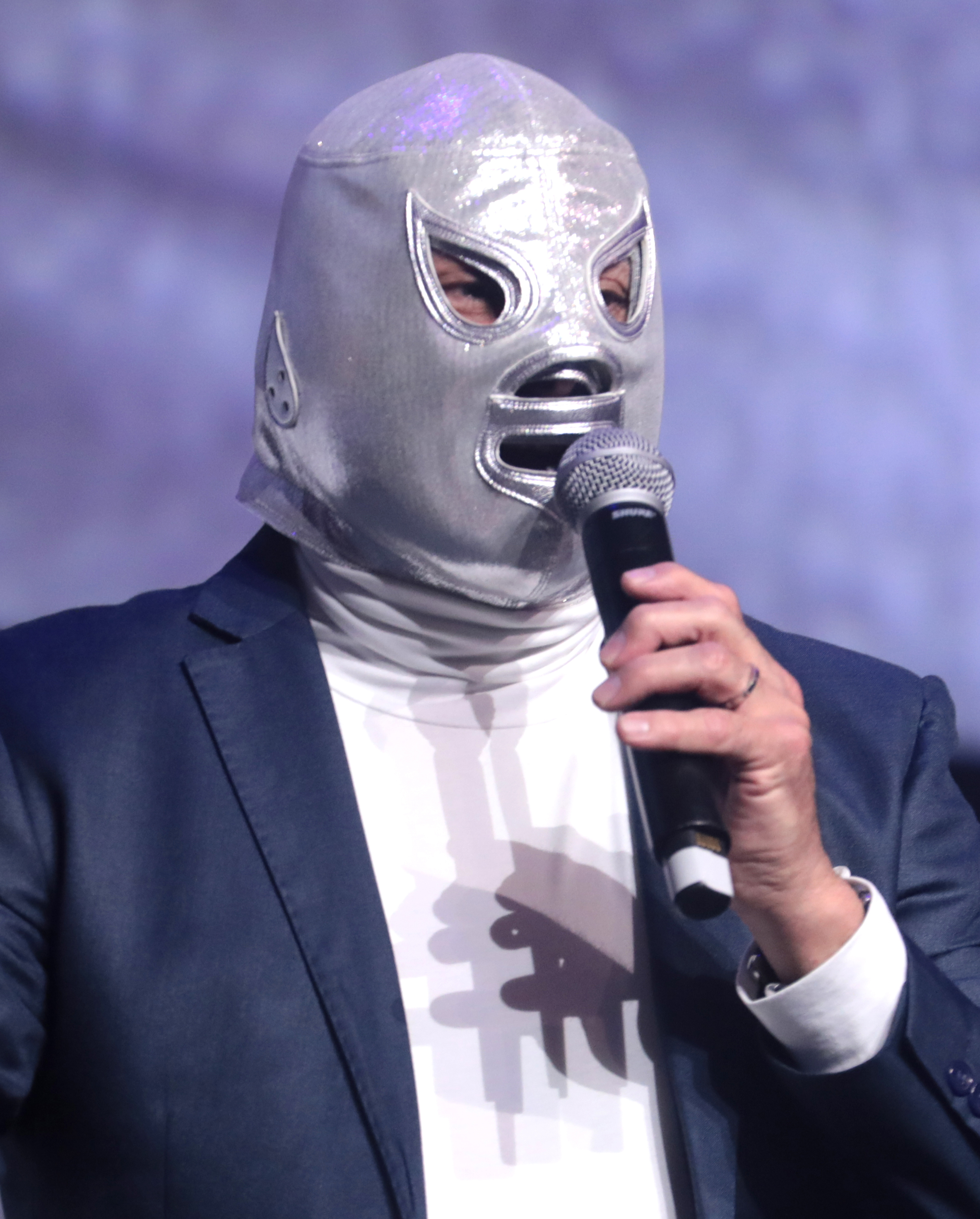
- El Hijo del Santo at the 2023 WonderCon

Personal information
- Born: Jorge Ernesto Guzmán Rodríguez; August 2, 1963 (age 62) Mexico City, Mexico
- Children: Santo Jr.
- Parent: El Santo (father)
- Relatives: Black Guzmán (uncle); Jesús Guzmán (uncle); Jimmy Guzmán (uncle); Axxel (nephew); Rocker II (nephew)

Professional wrestling career
- Ring names: El Hijo del Santo; El Korak
- Billed height: 1.68 m (5 ft 6 in)
- Billed weight: 82 kg (181 lb)
- Billed from: Tulancingo, Mexico
- Trained by: Rafael Salamanca; El Enfermero
- Debut: February 6, 1982
- Retired: December 13, 2025

Jorge Ernesto Guzmán Rodríguez (born August 2, 1963), best known under his ring name, El Hijo del Santo (English: "The Son of the Saint"), is a Mexican retired professional wrestler and political activist. He is the youngest child, out of eleven, of El Santo. Guzmán has also followed in his father's footsteps, as he has starred in several luchador films.

He made his wrestling debut in February 1982 under the name El Korak, but officially adopted his most famous ring name and silver mask in October 1982. During his career, Guzmán has worked for every major Mexican wrestling promotion including Consejo Mundial de Lucha Libre (CMLL), Asistencia Asesoría y Administración (AAA), Universal Wrestling Association (UWA) and World Wrestling Association (WWA) as well as stints with the World Wrestling Federation (now WWE) in the United States, as well as working in Japan for New Japan Pro-Wrestling, All Japan Pro-Wrestling and various other promotions. Early in his career, he formed a successful tag team with Eddie Guerrero called La Pareja Atomica, inspired by their fathers (El Santo and Gory Guerrero) teaming up from the 1940s to the 1960s. From 1998 through 2006, he also formed a very successful team with Negro Casas.

Over the span of his career, Guzmán has held various championships, most significantly the AAA World Tag Team Championship, Mexican National Middleweight Championship, Mexican National Trios Championship, Mexican National Welterweight Championship, CMLL World Tag Team Championship, UWA World Lightweight Championship, UWA World Welterweight Championship, WWA Tag Team Championship and WWA World Welterweight Championship as well as an honorary championship awarded by the World Boxing Council. He has also won the Leyenda de Plata tournament (held in honor of his father), the 1995 version of the CMLL International Gran Prix tournament and the 2004 Gran Alternativa tournament. In 1997, he was voted into the Wrestling Observer Newsletter Hall of Fame.

His son wrestles under the ring name Santo Jr., becoming the third-generation Guzmán to use the name "Santo". Guzmán's uncles, Black Guzmán, Pantera Negra and Jimmy Guzmán were also wrestlers. His nephew Axxel originally wrestled as "El Nieto del Santo" ("The Grandson of El Santo"), but Guzmán owned the rights to the "Santo" name and objected.

== Professional wrestling career ==
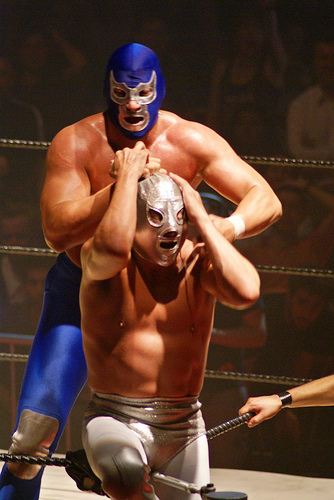
El Hijo del Santo (in front, in silver costume) in a match against Blue Demon Jr.

"Santito", as he is often called, was the only one of his father's 11 children to become a professional wrestler. He began wrestling without his father's consent in February 1982 as "El Korak" but he made his official debut as "El Hijo del Santo" in October of that year after he earned his college degree at the Universidad Iberoamericana in Communication Science per his father's request. He shared his father's look, the silver mask, tights and cape, and moves but he is shorter than his father was and, although he would never become the same cultural icon, he has been said to be a better in-ring performer than his father.

Early in his career, he wrestled mainly for World Wrestling Association (WWA) (The Tijuana circuit) and Universal Wrestling Association (UWA) (a promotion that worked in the Mexico City area) but he did make his debut for Empresa Mexicana de Lucha Libre (EMLL), the promotion that later became Consejo Mundial de Lucha Libre (CMLL) in Arena Mexico, in the summer of 1983. He also was voted "Rookie of the Year" in Mexico.

He won his first title, the UWA World Lightweight Championship, in October 1985 and traded the title with Aristóteles. He next feuded with Espanto Jr. (whose father feuded with the original El Santo) and Hijo del Santo took his mask. Espanto Jr. took Hijo del Santo's title but he regained it in 1988 and took Espanto Jr.'s hair as well after winning a Luchas de Apuestas (Spanish for "Bet match"). During this time, he also feuded with Negro Casas, who would become his most important opponent, and took his hair in a 1987 match in the Los Angeles Olympic Auditorium.

In 1990, he debuted in Japan for Gran Hamada's Universal Lucha Libre promotion and moved up a weight class by winning the UWA World Welterweight Championship as well as the WWA Welterweight Championship. In late 1991, he left WWA and vacated the Welterweight title but continued to wrestle for UWA until the formation of Asistencia Asesoría y Administración (AAA). El Hijo del Santo regained the WWA Welterweight title and brought it with him to AAA. One of the first feuds he was put in was against Negro Casas' youngest brother, Heavy Metal. Heavy Metal took Hijo del Santo's WWA Welterweight title and won the Mexican National Welterweight Championship but Hijo del Santo would come out on top of the feud and took both titles from Heavy Metal before he lost them again to another young star, Psicosis.

His most memorable feud during his time with AAA was against the American team, Los Gringos Locos. Eddy Guerrero's stiffer Japanese style offense, combined with "Love Machine" Art Barr's cocky mannerisms made Los Gringos Locos a very exciting yet hated tag team. During the feud, they played up the old Pareja Atómica tag team which consisted of El Santo and Eddie's father, Gory Guerrero. Eddie turned on Santo, leading to a hair vs. mask challenge for the When Worlds Collide pay-per-view. The match was changed at the last minute when Barr pleaded with AAA officials to be included on the show which would be broadcast in the United States. The new match was a double hair versus double mask match with Santo teaming with Octagón against Los Gringos Locos. El Hijo del Santo and Octagón were victorious. AAA owner Antonio Peña tried to run an angle with an evil version of El Santo called "El Santo Negro" who supposedly came from South America. When the other members of Santo's family objected, the feud was scrapped and Hijo del Santo jumped to CMLL in 1995.

The object of the jump was to revitalize his feud with Negro Casas. El Hijo del Santo lost a match to Casas at the CMLL 63rd Anniversary show on September 20, 1996, and took a brief hiatus. While gone, Negro Casas turned técnico (face) and his former allies, Scorpio Jr. and Bestia Salvaje said they had a surprise for Casas. The set-up was a trios match with Negro Casas, El Dandy and Héctor Garza on the técnico side with Scorpio Jr. and Bestia Salvaje on the rudo (or heel) side. El Hijo del Santo came down to the ring with Scorpio and Salvaje but was wearing a disguise and pretending to be El Felino, the brother of Negro Casas. During the match, Scorpio and Salvaje began attacking Casas and the fans, unaware of the ruse, expected El Felino to save his brother from the beating. Once he entered the ring, Hijo del Santo removed the disguise and revealed himself as Scorpio and Salvaje's partner, thus turning rudo for the first time in his career.

The fans were irate and fistfights broke out in the crowd as Hijo del Santo attacked Casas. The feud helped ease sagging business caused by the split with AAA and the downturn of the Mexican economy. The following week, the two trios had a rematch and both El Dandy and Negro Casas challenged Santo to a hair vs. mask match. The match was made a triangle match on December 6, 1996. Santo took El Dandy's hair in a bloody match in front of a sold-out crowd in Arena Mexico. The feud would continue until the 64th anniversary show on September 19, 1997, where Negro Casas and Hijo del Santo faced off in a dramatic hair vs. mask match. El Hijo del Santo won the match and began a slow face turn.

Although the angle was very successful and drew a lot of money for CMLL, Hijo del Santo continued to wrestle as a babyface throughout the country, even teaming with Rey Mysterio in Tijuana. Hijo del Santo began to be at odds with his heel allies, namely Scorpio Jr. and Bestia Salvaje. Finally, in September 1998, the face turn was made official when Hijo del Santo's partners, Villano III and Fuerza Guerrera turned on Santo. Scorpio Jr. and Salvaje joined in on the beat down, leading Santo's next big feud.

Santo worked in the World Wrestling Federation from 1998 to 1999 for Super Astros; Spanish-language television program. His tenure ended due to WWF's mandatory marketing policy regarding characters on their programming, which Santo refused to agree to due to his well-known protectiveness of his IP.

Negro Casas and Hijo del Santo began teaming together and chased Scorpio and Salvaje's recently won CMLL World Tag Team Championship. They defeated Scorpio and Salvaje for the titles on February 5, 1999, by disqualification but Hijo del Santo and Casas refused to accept the titles. The big match in the feud was a mask/hair versus mask/hair tag match between the two teams at CMLL's 1999 Homenaje a Dos Leyendas show. Santo and Casas were victorious and took the tag titles as well. El Hijo del Santo had a brief falling out with CMLL management and the tag titles were vacated. He returned and won the tag titles again with Casas from Los Guerreros del Infierno (Último Guerrero and Rey Bucanero) but later lost them back to Los Guerreros in 2002. El Hijo del Santo took another sabbatical from CMLL with Perro Aguayo Jr. filling in his spot on the roster. He returned to CMLL in the summer of 2004, initially to work with Místico to help him become a main eventer and to feud with Aguayo and his La Furia del Norte group. After the feud ended, he had a program with young Guerreros recruit Averno and they had a WWA Welterweight title match on October 22 where Hijo del Santo retained and ended his tour with the company.

El Hijo del Santo has continued wrestling as an independent worker doing shows all over Mexico. He even started his own promotion called Todo x el Todo. The promotion's main show so far was a "25 Year Anniversary Show" shown by Televisa, a testament to Hijo del Santo's appeal as Televisa rarely show independent promotions. The show featured a Relevos suicidas tournament where the losing teams advance until the finals, where the final team would fight each other over who would unmask. El Hijo del Santo ended up unmasking Pentagón Black in the finals, which meant that he booked himself to lose three times during the tournament. Around the time of Hijo del Santo's 25th Anniversary, the World Boxing Council (WBC) named him their "WBC World Wrestling Champion" complete with title belt due to his "significant accomplishments in wrestling". While the title is technically an honorary championship Hijo del Santo defended it several times in 2008. In 2008, Hijo del Santo began running shows in London, England featuring independent talent from Mexico.

On May 11, 2013, Hijo del Santo and his rival, Blue Demon Jr., joined forces to win the Pro Wrestling Revolution Tag Team Championship from Brian Cage and Derek Sanders.

On November 25, 2013, Santo announced a break to repair damage in his spinal area. After successful rehabilitation returned to the ring, teaming with his son El Santo Jr. at a Lucha Ilimitado card in Yakima, Washington on October 12, 2016, and closing out 2016 with two matches alongside his son in Tijuana on December 16 and in Ciudad Juarez on December 18.

== Outside wrestling ==
Like his father, Hijo del Santo has also crossed over into other media. He is the subject of a comic book published and appeared on the Mexican reality show Día de Perros. He was also the star of a 5 episode animated series on the Mexican version of Cartoon Network titled Santo vs The Clones. In 2007, he became a spokesperson for Wildcoast, an environmental non-profit organization, and campaigned to save sea turtles on the Gulf of Mexico from extinction. He has also been involved in gray whale campaigns and Tijuana clean-ups on behalf of Wildcoast.

=== Films ===
Hijo del Santo has appeared in several films, first with his father and then on his own or with other famous legends of professional wrestling in Mexico. In 2001 he starred in the film Infraterrestre, which received positive reviews from critics such as the respected Mexican film critic, David Wilt. In 2007 he appeared in the film Mil Mascaras vs. the Aztec Mummy (also known as Mil Mascaras: Resurrection), which also received positive reviews.

Year	Title	Role	Notes
1968	Santo contra Capulina ("Santo vs. Capulina")	Jorge	
1970	Santo en la venganza de la momia ("Santo in The Mummy's Revenge")	Agapito	Credited as Niño Jorgito
1974	Santo en la venganza de la llorona ("Santo in The Revenge of the Crying Woman")	Carlitos	
1981	Chanoc y el hijo del Santo contra los vampiros asesinos ("Chanoc and the Son of Santo vs. the Killer Vampires")	El Hijo del Santo	
1983	Frontera sin ley ("The Lawless Border")	El Hijo del Santo	
1991	El poder de Omnicron ("The Power of Omnicron")	El Hijo del Santo	The film was never released
1992	La fuerza de un ídolo ("The Strength of an Idol")	El Hijo del Santo	Direct-to-video
1993	Santo: la leyenda del enmascarado de plata ("Santo: The Legend of the Man in the Silver Mask")	El Santo/Hombre Rojo	
2001	Infraterrestre ("Infraterrestrial")	El Santo	
2006	¡Esta máscara es mía! o Santo contra los burócratas ("This Mask is Mine! Or Santo against the Bureaucrats")	El Santo	Short film
2007	Mil Mascaras vs. the Aztec Mummy	El Hijo del Santo	Also known as Mil Mascaras: Resurrection
2008	El Hijo del Santo ("The Son of the Saint")	El Santo	Short film
2016	Santo, El Enmascarado de Plata ("Santo, The Man in the Silver Mask")	El Santo	Short film
2020	El camino de Xico ("Xico's Journey")	Mr. Brown	Voice role
2022	Demogorgon vs. El Santo	El Santo	Short film Stranger Things tie-in
2023	Cassandro	El Hijo del Santo	

== Personal life ==
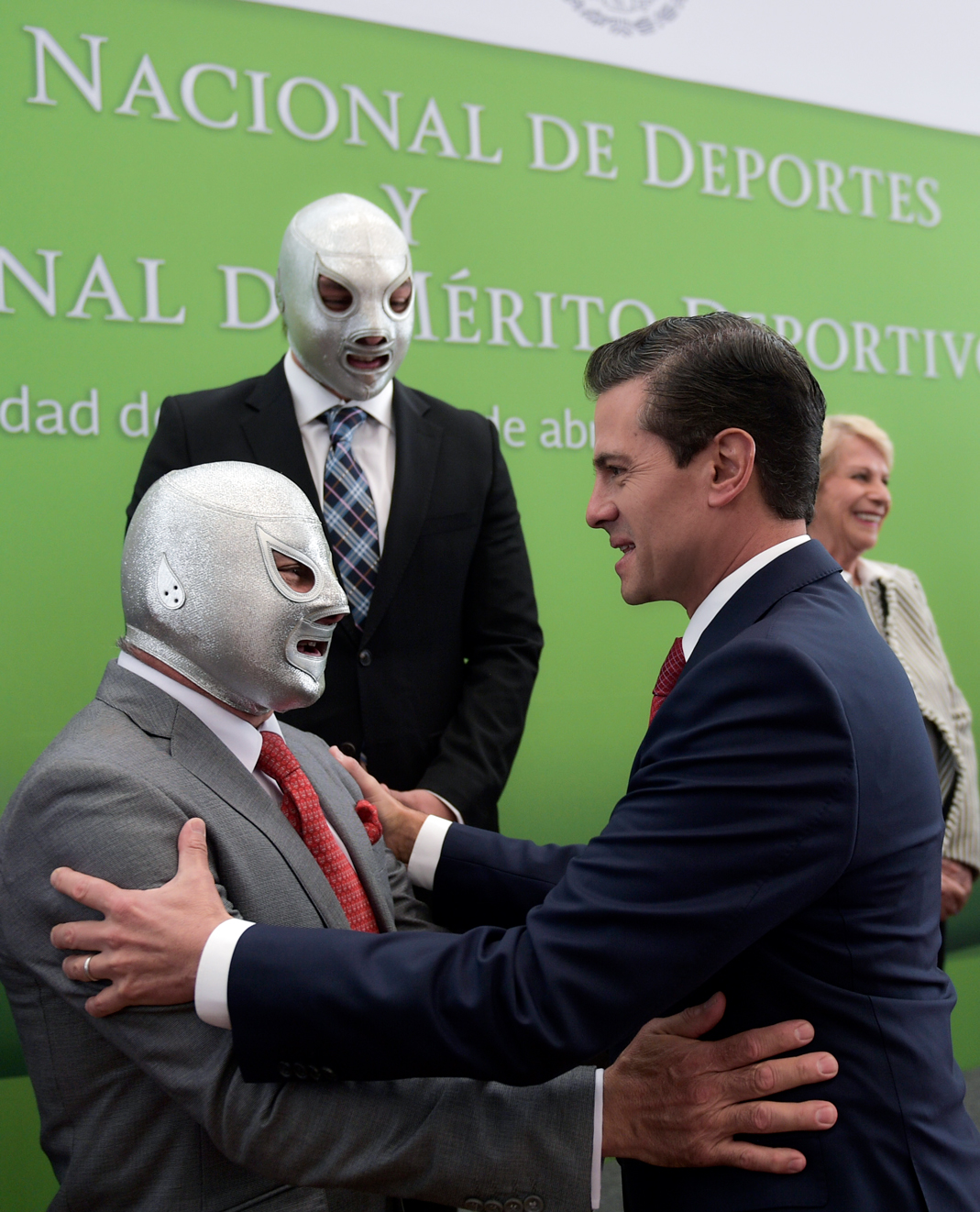
El Hijo del Santo embracing Mexican President Enrique Peña Nieto, as Santo Jr. looks on, April 2018

In March 2013, it was announced that one of Hijo del Santo's sons was going to travel to Japan to train in Pro Wrestling Noah wrestling school to prepare him for his wrestling debut under the ring name "El Nieto del Santo" ("The Grandson of El Santo"). The training started in May 2013 and he was set to return to Mexico three months later for his official in-ring debut. El Nieto del Santo was the first masked wrestler to attend the wrestling school, in honor of the lucha libre traditions and anonymity of their enmascarados. He made his wrestling debut in 2015, working under the name "Tempestad", before adopting the name "El Santo Jr." in July 2016.

== Championships and accomplishments ==
- Asistencia Asesoría y Administración
  - AAA/IWC World Tag Team Championship (1 time) – with Octagón
  - Mexican National Middleweight Championship (1 time)
  - Mexican National Trios Championship (1 time) – with Super Muñeco and Ángel Azteca
  - Mexican National Welterweight Championship (1 time)
- Consejo Mundial de Lucha Libre
  - CMLL World Tag Team Championship (3 times) – with Negro Casas
  - CMLL Torneo Gran Alternativa (2004) – with Místico
  - International Gran Prix: 1996
  - Leyenda de Plata: 1999
- Pro Wrestling Revolution
  - PWR Tag Team Championship (1 time) – with Blue Demon Jr.
- Southern California Pro-Wrestling Hall of Fame
  - Class of 2005
- IWC Legacy
  - IWC Universal Championship (1 time, final)
- Universal Wrestling Association
  - UWA World Lightweight Championship (3 times)
  - UWA World Welterweight Championship (2 times)
- World Boxing Council
  - WBC World Wrestling Championship (1 time)
- World Wrestling Association
  - WWA World Tag Team Championship (1 time) – with Perro Aguayo, Jr.
  - WWA World Welterweight Championship (10 times)
- Pro Wrestling Illustrated
  - PWI ranked him # 63 of the 500 best singles wrestlers during the PWI Years in 2003.
  - PWI ranked him # 26 of the 100 best tag teams during the "PWI Years" with Octagon in 2003.
  - PWI ranked him # 14 of the 500 best singles wrestlers of the PWI 500 in 2003 and 2004
- Wrestling Observer Newsletter awards
  - Wrestling Observer Newsletter Hall of Fame (Class of 1997)

== Luchas de Apuestas record ==
Winner (wager)	Loser (wager)	Location	Event	Date	Notes
El Hijo del Santo (mask)	El Pierroth (mask)	Veracruz, Veracruz	Live event	October 31, 1982	
El Hijo del Santo (mask)	El Buitre (mask)	Pachuca, Hidalgo	Live event	July 28, 1983	
El Hijo del Santo (mask)	Lobo Rubio (hair)	Veracruz, Veracruz	Live event	October 28, 1983	
El Hijo del Santo (mask)	El Galáctico (mask)	Pachuca, Hidalgo	Live event	February 26, 1984	
El Hijo del Santo (mask)	Chamaco Castro (hair)	Panama City, Panama	Live event	September 4, 1984	
El Hijo del Santo (mask)	El Guerrero (hair)	Acapulco, Guerrero	Live event	January 27, 1985	
El Hijo del Santo (mask)	El Porro (hair)	Tijuana, Baja California	Live event	February 26, 1985	
El Hijo del Santo (mask)	Ray Richard (hair)	Naucalpan, Mexico State	Live event	March 17, 1985	
El Hijo del Santo (mask)	El Diluvio (mask)	Texcoco, Mexico State	Live event	March 23, 1985	
El Hijo del Santo (mask)	Cosmonauta (mask)	Apatlaco, Mexico State	Live event	March 30, 1985	
El Hijo del Santo (mask)	Aristóteles I (mask)	Naucalpan, Mexico State	Live event	July 28, 1985	
El Hijo del Santo (mask)	Tornado Negro (hair)	Tijuana, Baja California	Live event	August 9, 1985	
El Hijo del Santo (mask)	Aristóteles II (mask)	Acapulco, Guerrero	Live event	November 27, 1985	
El Hijo del Santo (mask)	El Ninja (mask)	Tijuana, Baja California	Live event	December 13, 1985	
El Hijo del Santo (mask)	Ray Tony (hair)	Veracruz, Veracruz	Live event	December 18, 1985	
El Hijo del Santo (mask)	Skeletor (mask)	Monterrey, Nuevo León	Live event	December 22, 1985	
El Hijo del Santo (mask)	Aristóteles I (hair)	Ciudad Juárez, Chihuahua	Live event	March 9, 1986	
El Hijo del Santo (mask)	Espanto Jr. (mask)	Monterrey, Nuevo León	Live event	August 31, 1986	
El Hijo del Santo (mask)	Kato Kung Lee (mask)	Tijuana, Baja California	Live event	August 31, 1986	
El Hijo del Santo (mask)	Flama Azul (hair)	Nezahualcoyotl, Mexico State	Live event	January 30, 1987	
El Hijo del Santo (mask)	Black Terry (hair)	Irapuato, Guanajuato	Live event	March 9, 1987	
El Hijo del Santo (mask)	Ray Richard (hair)	Morelia, Michoacán	Live event	April 1987	
El Hijo del Santo (mask)	Lobo Rubio (hair)	Naucalpan, Mexico State	Live event	June 7, 1987	
El Hijo del Santo (mask)	Negro Casas (hair)	Los Angeles, California, United States	Live event	July 18, 1987	
El Hijo del Santo (mask)	Espanto Jr. (hair)	Torreón, Coahuila	Live event	August 2, 1987	
El Hijo del Santo (mask)	Silver King (mask)	Tijuana, Baja California	Live event	November 13, 1987	
El Hijo del Santo (mask)	Principe Island (mask)	Apatlaco, Mexico State	Live event	November 21, 1987	
El Hijo del Santo (mask)	El Estudiante (hair)	Mexicali, Baja California	Live event	March 28, 1988	
El Hijo del Santo (mask)	El Tarahumara (hair)	Saltillo, Coahuila	Live event	April 9, 1988	
El Hijo del Santo (mask)	Espanto Jr. (hair)	Monterrey, Nuevo León	Live event	May 8, 1988	
El Hijo del Santo (mask)	León Chino (mask)	Tijuana, Baja California	Live event	August 19, 1988	
El Hijo del Santo (mask)	El Brujo (mask)	Teotihuacán, Mexico State	Live event	October 22, 1988	
El Hijo del Santo (mask)	Cuchillo (mask)	Naucalpan, Mexico State	Live event	October 30, 1988	
El Hijo del Santo (mask)	El Brujo (hair)	Teotihuacán, Mexico State	Live event	November 26, 1988	
El Hijo del Santo (mask)	Starman (mask)	Cancún, Quintana Roo	Live event	December 2, 1988	
El Hijo del Santo (mask)	La Momia (mask)	Puerto Escondido, Oaxaca	Live event	March 26, 1989	
El Hijo del Santo (mask)	Masdek (mask)	Tijuana, Baja California	Live event	May 19, 1989	(Note: This was a three-way match that also included León Chino.)
El Hijo del Santo (mask)	Espanto Jr. (hair)	Naucalpan, Mexico State	Live event	September 17, 1989	
El Hijo del Santo (mask)	All Star (mask)	Mexico City	Juicio Final	December 8, 1989	(Note: Three way match that also included Fuerza Guerrera.)
El Hijo del Santo (mask)	Tornado Negro (hair)	Tijuana, Baja California	Live event	February 9, 1990	
El Hijo del Santo (mask)	Brazo de Oro (hair)	Naucalpan, Mexico State	Live event	January 13, 1991	
El Hijo del Santo (mask)	Black Shadow Jr. (mask)	Monterrey, Nuevo León	Live event	December 15, 1991	(Note: Relevos Suicidas match with Black Shadow, Jr. and El Hijo del Santo vs. Octagón and Fuerza Guerrera.)
El Hijo del Santo (mask) and Octagón (mask)	La Pareja del Terror (hair) (Art Barr and Eddy Guerrero)	Los Angeles, California	AAA When Worlds Collide	November 6, 1994	
El Hijo del Santo (mask)	El Dandy (hair)	Mexico City	Live event	December 6, 1996	(Note: This was a three-way match that also included Negro Casas.)
El Hijo del Santo (mask)	Negro Casas (hair)	Mexico City	CMLL 64th Anniversary Show	September 19, 1997	
El Hijo del Santo (mask)	Guerrero del Futuro (mask)	Mexico City	Ruleta de la Muerte	July 17, 1998	
El Hijo del Santo (mask)	Gacela del Ring (mask)	Ciudad Juárez, Chihuahua	Live event	September 28, 1998	
El Hijo del Santo (mask)	Gacela del Ring (hair)	Ciudad Juárez, Chihuahua	Live event	December 6, 1998	
El Hijo del Santo (mask)	Asterisco (hair)	Reynosa, Tamaulipas	Live event	December 20, 1998	(Note: Three Way match that also included El Felino.)
El Hijo del Santo (mask) and Negro Casas (hair)	Scorpio Jr. (mask) and Bestia Salvaje (hair)	Mexico City	Homenaje a Dos Leyendas	March 19, 1999	
El Hijo del Santo (mask)	Misterioso (hair)	Anaheim, California	Live event	September 5, 1999	
El Hijo del Santo (mask)	El Nuevo Huracán Ramírez Jr. (mask)	Celaya, Guanajuato	Live event	February 2, 2000	(Note: Relevos Suicidas match with El Hijo del Santo and Huracán Ramírez Jr. vs. Blue Panther and Fuerza Guerrera.)
El Hijo del Santo (mask)	Dr. Cerebro (mask)	Naucalpan, Mexico State	Live event	March 1, 2001	
El Hijo del Santo (mask)	Nicho "el Millonario" (hair)	Tijuana, Baja California	Destino Final	April 6, 2001	
El Hijo del Santo (mask)	Scorpio Jr. (hair)	Naucalpan, Mexico State	Live event	December 19, 2002	
El Hijo del Santo (mask)	Super Parka (mask)	Tijuana, Baja California	Live event	October 9, 2003	
El Hijo del Santo (mask)	El Hijo del Cobarde (mask)	Ciudad Juárez, Chihuahua	Live event	February 29, 2004	
El Hijo del Santo (mask)	El Dandy (hair)	Tijuana, Baja California	Live event	October 29, 2004	
El Hijo del Santo (mask)	Scorpio, Jr. (hair)	Los Angeles, California	Live event	July 16, 2005	
El Hijo del Santo (mask)	Cyber Vikingo (mask)	Monterrey, Nuevo León	Live event	August 21, 2005	(Note: Six way cage match also featuring Centurion Negro, Diluvio Negro I, Gato Volador and Silver Star.)
El Hijo del Santo (mask)	Mano Negra (hair)	Tijuana, Baja California	Live event	November 26, 2006	
El Hijo del Santo (mask)	Cassandro (hair)	Los Angeles, California	Live event	July 14, 2007	(Note: Steel cage match with Rey Misterio, Sr., El Hijo de Rey Misterio, L.A. Park, Nicho, Pentagon Black and Gran Hamada.)
El Hijo del Santo (mask)	Mano Negra (hair)	Tijuana, Baja California	Live event	November 26, 2006	(Note: 8 team losers advance tournament finals.)
El Hijo del Santo (mask)	Ángel Blanco Jr (mask)	Mexico City	Live event	March 31, 2012	
El Hijo del Santo (mask)	Misterioso Jr. (mask)	Arena Ciudad de Mexico	Live event	April 6, 2025	
