= Skayde =

Mexican professional wrestler

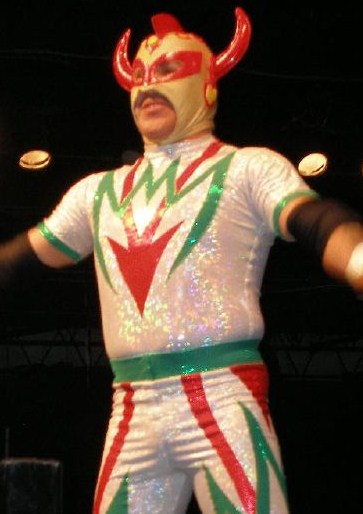

Personal information
- Born: Jorge Rivera Soriano; 2 August 1964 (age 61) Mexico City, Mexico

Professional wrestling career
- Ring name(s): Boomerang; Destello; El Seminarista; Elektra; Jorge Rivera; La Flecha; Porsche; Power Raider Blanco; Skayde
- Billed height: 1.70 m (5 ft 7 in)
- Billed weight: 87 kg (192 lb)
- Billed from: Xalapa, Veracruz
- Trained by: Robin Hood
- Debut: October 10, 1987

Jorge Rivera Soriano (born September 2, 1964) is a Mexican professional wrestler who is best known as a trainer. He has been a tecnico (face) throughout his wrestling career. He is currently training wrestlers at Arena Xalapa, different states of Mexico and the United States.

== Professional wrestling career ==
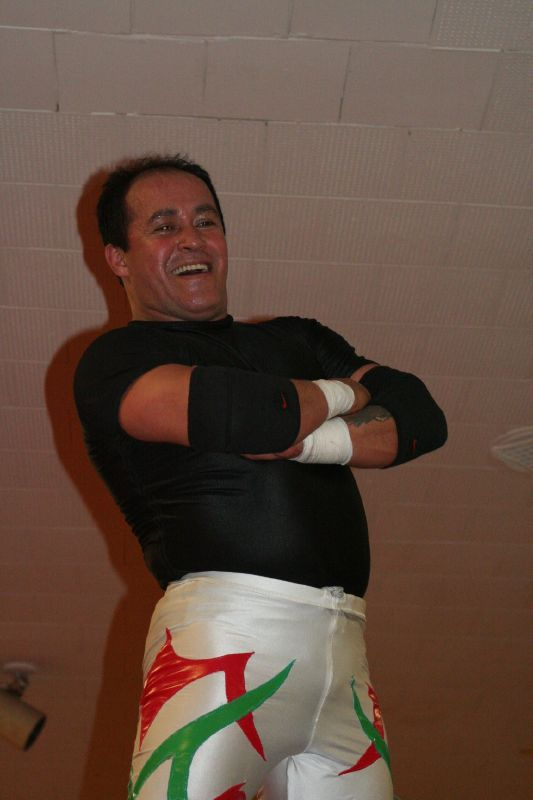
An unmasked Skayde in 2008

Rivera started professional wrestling in 1987 under the names of "Porsche" and "El Seminarista". As El Seminarista, he won a Luchas de Apuestas (bet match) against a young Super Crazy for his mask. He later wrestled as "La Flecha" between 1988 and 1993. His breakout year was when he went to Asistencia Asesoría y Administración in 1995 with the new gimmick of "Power Raider Blanco" (Spanish for "Power Ranger White") and became a member of the Power Raider group. The whole idea of this was Antonio Peña's who thought doing this could get the fans excited. Peña later got sued by Mattel and decided to re-gimmick all of those who were in Power Raider to Los Cadetes Del Espacio. Since then he changed his name to "Boomerang" for a year before changing it to his most famous one, "Skayde". He later left AAA in 1997 to work for Promo Azteca. In Promo Azteca, he wrestled as Skayde before leaving in 1998. In 1999 he worked between Asistencia Asesoría y Administración, Consejo Mundial de Lucha Libre, and International Wrestling Revolution Group as "Electra". In 2000, Rivera started to wrestle in Toryumon Mexico using his real name and unmasking as "Jorge Rivera". Rivera then traveled to the United States, where he wrestled in both Chikara and Combat Zone Wrestling as Destello. Rivera has also wrestled in Japan in Dragon Gate as Skayde. and is currently wrestling on the independent circuit in Mexico. In March 2009, Rivera took part in the Chikara's King of Trios Tournament, teaming up with Mike Quackenbush and Johnny Saint in "The Masters of a Thousand Holds" team. They would win their opening round match against "Incoherence" (Delirious, Hallowicked and Frightmare), but would lose their quarter-final round match against "Team Uppercut", which consisted of Bryan Danielson, Claudio Castagnoli, and Dave Taylor. Rivera was scheduled to enter the 2010 King of Trios tournament, teaming with El Valiente and Turbo, but after he reportedly tried to hold the company up for more money, while failing to deliver Valiente and Turbo, Chikara announced that they were severing ties with him effective immediately. In late 2012 Skayde started working with River City Wrestling (RCW) out of San Antonio, TX, both wrestling and running training clinics on teaching the local San Antonio wrestlers lucha libre. In 2017 Skayde joined the training team at the Pro Wrestling Revolution Training Academy in San Jose, CA.

== Professional wrestling trainer ==
Over the years Skayde has had a hand in training the following wrestlers:

- Alex Koslov
- Amigo Suzuki
- Andy Sumner
- Anthony W. Mori
- Angel de Fuego
- Ares
- Atomico Ramirez
- Belial
- Bestia 666
- Billy Boy
- Black Thunder
- Brother YASSHI
- Celestial
- Chris Hero
- Claudio Castagnoli
- Crossbones
- Daisuke Hanaoka
- Dark Ozz
- Dr. Cheung
- Dragon Fly
- Drew Gulak
- Ek Balam
- Emil Sitoci
- Eragon
- Fénix
- La Flecha
- Fuego
- Glenn Spectre
- Gran Akuma
- Hajime Ohara
- Hallowicked
- El Hijo de L.A. Park
- El Hijo del Hijo Asesino
- Hydra
- Ikaro
- Jigsaw
- Jolly Roger
- Jun Ogawauchi
- KAGETORA
- Kinya Oyanagi
- Lance Steel
- Lince Dorado
- Masato Yoshino
- Mike Quackenbush
- Milano Collection A.T.
- Mini Kenzo Suzuki
- Naruki Doi
- Nebula
- Orange Cassidy
- Phillip J. Fukumasa
- Raziel
- Rip Impact
- Rorschach
- Ryo Saito
- Sabian
- Seiya
- Shachihoko Boy
- Soldier Ant
- Star Fire
- STIGMA
- Super Fly
- Takayuki Yagi
- Taku Iwasa
- Tarucito
- Templario
- Tim Donst
- Toru Owashi
- Tsutomu Oosugi
- Turbo
- UltraMantis Black
- Violencia Jr.
- Worker Ant
- X-Fly

== Championships and accomplishments ==
- NWA Mexico
  - NWA Mexican Lightweight Championship (1 time)
  - NWA Mexican Welterweight Championship (3 times)
- Pro Wrestling Illustrated
  - PWI ranked him #189 of the 500 best singles wrestlers of the PWI 500 in 2005
- Universal Wrestling Association
  - UWA World Lightweight Championship (1 time)
- Xtreme Mexican Wrestling
  - XMW Junior Heavyweight Championship (1 time, current)
  - XMW Tag Team Championship (1 time) – with Durango Kid

== Luchas de Apuestas record ==
| Winner (wager) | Loser (wager) | Location | Event | Date | Notes |
|---|---|---|---|---|---|
| El Seminarista (mask) | Super Crazy (mask) | State of Mexico | Live event | March 1998 | |
| Skayde and Tigre Blanco (mask) | Night Ranger and Street Fire (mask) | Cuernavaca, Morelos | Live event | December 5, 2002 | |
| Místico (mask) | Skayde (mask) | Mexico City | Live event | March 7, 2007 | |
